= Sanremo Music Festival 2006 =

Italian song contest (56th edition)

Dates and venue
- Semi-final 1: 27 February 2006
- Semi-final 2: 28 February 2006
- Semi-final 3: 2 March 2006
- Semi-final 4: 3 March 2006
- Final: 4 March 2006
- Venue: Teatro Ariston; Sanremo, Italy

Production
- Broadcaster: Radiotelevisione italiana (RAI)
- Director: Paolo Beldì
- Musical director: Renato Serio
- Artistic director: Giorgio Panariello, Gianmarco Mazzi
- Presenters: Giorgio Panariello and Victoria Cabello

Overall competition
- Number of entries: 30
- Winner: "Vorrei avere il becco" Povia

Newcomers' section
- Number of entries: 12
- Winner: "Sole negli occhi" Riccardo Maffoni

Men section
- Number of entries: 6
- Winner: "Vorrei avere il becco" Povia

Women section
- Number of entries: 6
- Winner: "Essere una donna" Anna Tatangelo

Groups section
- Number of entries: 6
- Winner: "Dove si va" I Nomadi

The Sanremo Music Festival 2006 (Italian: Festival di Sanremo 2006), officially the 56th Italian Song Festival (56º Festival della canzone italiana), was the 56th annual Sanremo Music Festival, held at the Teatro Ariston in Sanremo between 27 February and 4 March 2006 and broadcast by Radiotelevisione italiana (RAI). The show was presented by comedian Giorgio Panariello with Victoria Cabello. Panariello and Gianmarco Mazzi served as the artistic directors.

The competition took place between 30 songs, divided into four different categories—Men, Women, Groups and Newcomers. As in the previous year, a winner for each category was announced, and the final winner of the competition was selected among the artist which took first place in one of the five sections. After placing first in the Men section with his entry "Vorrei avere il becco", Povia was announced the winner of the competition, beating I Nomadi's "Dove si va", Anna Tatangelo's "Essere una donna" and Riccardo Maffoni's "Sole negli occhi", winners of the sections Groups, Women and Newcomers, respectively.

== Presenters and personnel ==
Sanremo Music Festival 2006 presenters

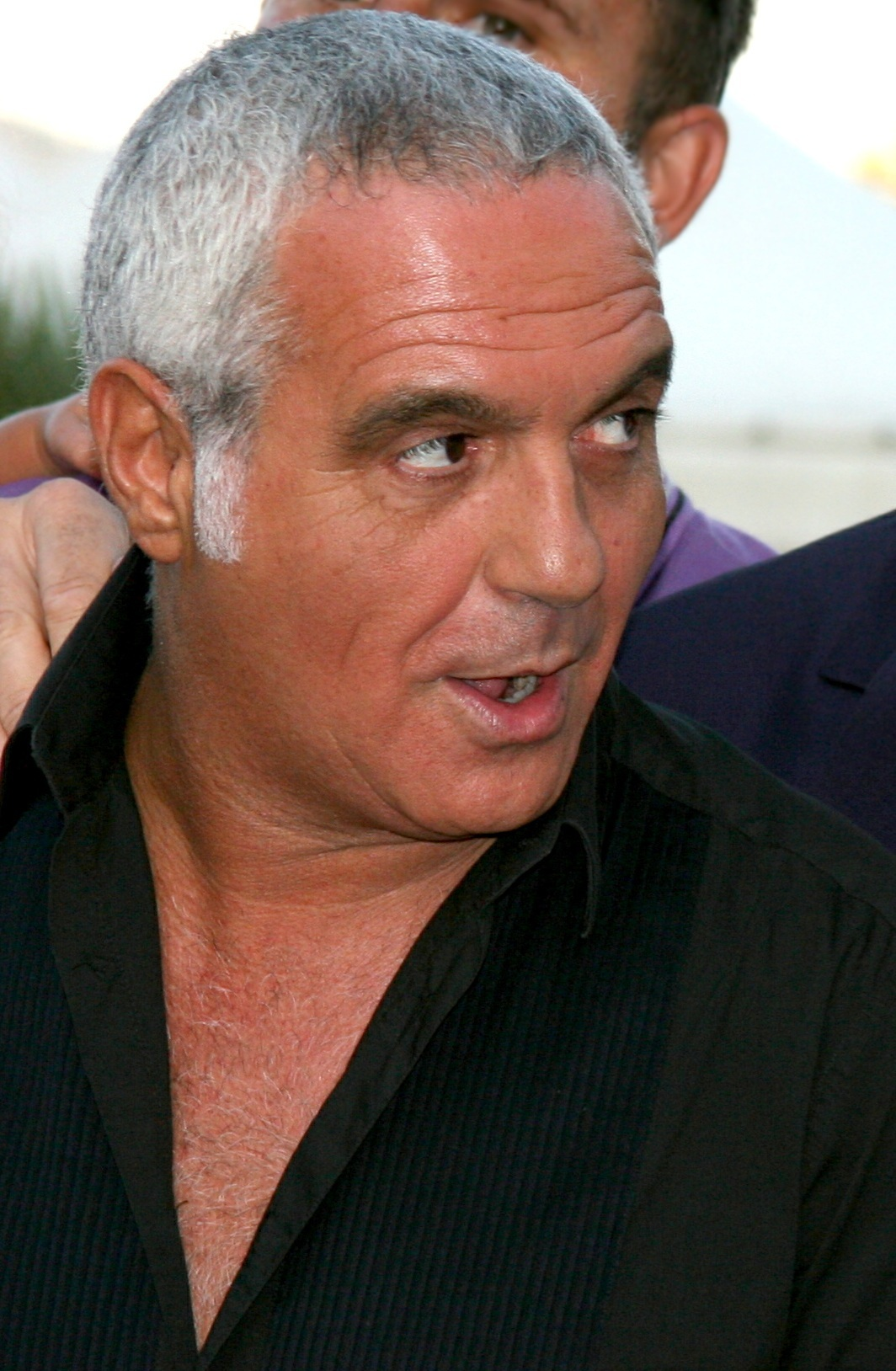
Giorgio Panariello

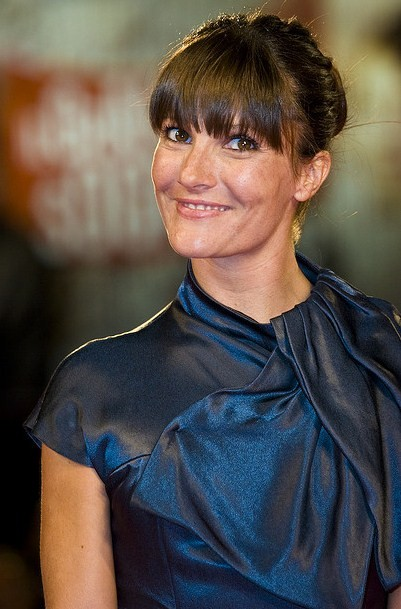
Victoria Cabello

In June 2005, Rai 1 director Fabrizio Del Noce announced that he was planning to choose Italian comedian Giorgio Panariello and actress Sabrina Ferilli as the presenters of the Sanremo Music Festival 2006. In October of the same year, Panariello was officially confirmed as the presenter of the event. Panariello also served as the artistic director of the show, together with Gianmarco Mazzi, who was confirmed for the third time in this role. Victoria Cabello were later announced as the co-presenters of the 56th Sanremo Music Festival, while Sabrina Ferilli did not take part in the show. Models Marta Cecchetto, Claudia Cedro, Vanessa Hessler and Francesca Lancini also took part in the show, introducing the competing artists during the 5 nights of the music contest.

The Sanremo Festival Orchestra was directed by Renato Serio, while the scenography was created by the Academy Award-winning production designer Dante Ferretti. The authors of the show, directed by Paolo Beldì, were Eddi Berni, Riccardo Cassini, Claudio Fasulo, Pietro Galeotti, Giorgio Panariello, Carlo Pistarino and Claudio Sabelli Fioretti.

== Shows ==
=== First night ===
==== Men, Women and Groups sections ====
Key:

– Contestant competing in the "Men" section.
– Contestant competing in the "Women" section.
– Contestant competing in the "Groups" section.

Performances of the contestants on the first night
R/O	Artist(s)	Song	Songwriter(s)	Result (section)
1	Nicky Nicolai	"Lei ha la notte"	Tiziana Blu; Nicky Nicolai; Marco Rinalduzzi; Marco D'Angelo	3rd (Women)
2	Dolcenera	"Com'è straordinaria la vita"	Dolcenera; Lorenzo Imerico; Roberto Pacco	1st (Women)
3	I Ragazzi di Scampia & Gigi Finizio	"Musica e speranza	Mogol; Gigi D'Alessio	4th (Groups)
4	Noa, Carlo Fava & Solis String Quartet	"Un discorso in generale"	Carlo Fava; Gianluca Martinelli	3rd (Groups)
5	Povia	"Vorrei avere il becco"	Giuseppe Povia	4th (Men)
6	Ron	"L'uomo delle stelle"	Ron	3rd (Men)
7	Simona Bencini	"Tempesta"	Simona Bencini; Elisa Toffoli	5th (Women)
8	Spagna	"Noi non possiamo cambiare"	Maurizio Morante	4th (Women)
9	Sugarfree	"Solo lei mi dà"	Fortunato Zampaglione; Marco Salom; Matteo Amantia Scuderi; Giuseppe Lo Iacono	6th (Groups)
10	Mario Venuti & Arancia Sonora	"Un altro posto nel mondo"	Mario Venuti; Kaballà	5th (Groups)
11	Alex Britti	"...solo con te"	Alex Britti	2nd (Men)
12	Luca Dirisio	"Sparirò"	Luca Dirisio	5th (Men)
13	Anna Oxa	"Processo a me stessa"	Pasquale Panella; Anna Oxa; Alessandra Miori	6th (Women)
14	Anna Tatangelo	"Essere una donna"	Mogol; Gigi D'Alessio	2nd (Women)
15	Nomadi	"Dove si va"	Cristian Cattini; Danilo Sacco; Massimo Vecchi; Giuseppe Carletti	1st (Groups)
16	Zero Assoluto	"Svegliarsi la mattina"	Matteo Maffucci; Thomas De Gasperi; Danilo Pao; Enrico Sognato	2nd (Groups)
17	Gianluca Grignani	"Liberi di sognare"	Gianluca Grignani	6th (Men)
12	Michele Zarrillo	"L'alfabeto degli amanti"	Vincenzo Incenzo; Michele Zarrillo	1st (Men)

==== Guests and other performances ====
- American actor John Travolta was the first international guest of the show. He was interviewed by Victoria Cabello, and he performed a fragment of Domenico Modugno's 1958 hit "Nel blu dipinto di blu", as a duet with Giorgio Panariello.
- The Italian curling team, which competed in the 2006 Winter Olympics, also appeared during the night, explaining the rules of curling and showing how to play it, during a sketch with Giorgio Panariello.

=== Second night ===
==== Men, Women and Groups sections ====
Key:

– Contestant competing in the "Men" section.
– Contestant competing in the "Women" section.
– Contestant competing in the "Groups" section.

Performances of the contestants of the Men, Women and Groups sections on the second night
R/O	Artist(s)	Song	Result (section)
1	Anna Oxa	"Processo a me stessa"	3rd (Women)
2	Sugarfree	"Solo lei mi dà"	2nd (Groups)
3	Gianluca Grignani	"Liberi di sognare"	3rd (Men)
4	Anna Tatangelo	"Essere una donna"	1st (Women)
5	Mario Venuti & Arancia Sonora	"Un altro posto nel mondo"	3rd (Groups)
6	Ron	"L'uomo delle stelle"	1st (Men)
7	Nicky Nicolai	"Lei ha la notte"	2nd (Women)
8	I Ragazzi di Scampia & Gigi Finizio	"Musica e speranza"	1st (Groups)
9	Povia	"Vorrei avere il becco"	2nd (Men)

==== Newcomers section ====
Performances of the contestants of the Newcomers section on the second night
R/O	Artist(s)	Song	Songwriter(s)	Result
10	Simone Cristicchi	"Che bella gente"	Simone Cristicchi; Simona Cipollone	Advanced
11	Monia Russo	"Un mondo senza parole"	Bruno Illiano	Advanced
12	Virginio	"Davvero"	Virginio Simonelli; Paolo Agosta	Eliminated
13	Helena Hellwig	"Di luna morirei"	Giuseppe Mango; Carlo De Bei; Rocco Petruzzi	Advanced
14	Deasonika	"Non dimentico più"	Max Zanotti; Francesco Tumminelli; Walter Clemente; Marco Trentacoste	Eliminated
15	Antonello	"Capirò crescerai"	Antonio Carozza; Salvio Pietroluongo	Eliminated

==== Guests and other performances ====
- Italian soccer player Francesco Totti and the showgirls Ilary Blasi, was interviewed by Giorgio Panariello. After the interview, the chorus performed a fragment of Claudio Baglioni's "Questo piccolo grande amore", regarded by Totti and Blasi as the symbol of their love story.
- After Nicky Nicolai's performance, American singer and actor Jesse McCartney was introduced as the first international guest of the night. He sang his single "Because You Live".
- Riccardo Cocciante also appeared on stage to receive the City of Sanremo Award. He also performed the songs "Bella senz'anima" and "Margherita".
- At the end of the night, American singer Hilary Duff performed her song "Wake Up".

=== Third night ===
==== Men, Women and Groups sections ====
Key:

– Contestant competing in the "Men" section.
– Contestant competing in the "Women" section.
– Contestant competing in the "Groups" section.

Performances of the contestants of the Men, Women and Groups sections on the third night
R/O	Artist(s)	Song	Result (section)
1	Simona Bencini	"Tempesta"	2nd (Women)
2	Nomadi	"Dove si va"	1st (Groups)
3	Alex Britti	"...solo con te"	1st (Men)
4	Spagna	"Noi non possiamo cambiare"	3rd (Women)
5	Zero Assoluto	"Svegliarsi la mattina"	2nd (Groups)
6	Michele Zarrillo	"L'alfabeto degli amanti"	2nd (Men)
7	Dolcenera	"Com'è straordinaria la vita"	1st (Women)
8	Noa, Carlo Fava & Solis String Quartet	"Un discorso in generale"	3rd (Groups)
9	Luca Dirisio	"Sparirò"	3rd (Men)

==== Newcomers section ====
Performances of the contestants of the Newcomers section on the third night
R/O	Artist(s)	Song	Songwriter(s)	Result
10	L'Aura	"Irraggiungibile"	L'Aura	Advanced
11	Riccardo Maffoni	"Sole negli occhi"	Riccardo Maffoni	Advanced
12	Ameba4	"Rido... forse mi sbaglio"	Fabio Properzi	Eliminated
13	Ivan Segreto	"Con un gesto"	Ivan Segreto	Eliminated
14	Andrea Ori	"Nel tuo mare"	Andrea Ori; Mino Vergnaghi	Eliminated
15	Tiziano Orecchio	"Preda innocente"	Matteo Di Franco; Andrea Zuppini; Marco Andrini	Advanced

==== Guests and other performances ====
- Italian actor Leonardo Pieraccioni opened the night with a sketch, in which he announced for joke that presenter Panariello had refused to appear on stage during the third night as a result of criticisms and poor ratings received during the previous episodes of the show.
- During the night, after Britti's performance of his entry "...solo con te", Panariello interviewed American wrestler John Cena.
- Actor Carlo Verdone performed Assunta De Senis, a fictional old woman from the past editions of the Sanremo Music Festival. During his performance, he was joined on stage by Silvio Muccino to promote the film My Best Enemy, in which they both starred.
- Maria Grazia Cucinotta presented the film All the Invisible Children, produced by Cucinotta herself.
- The Italian gold medalists at the 2006 Winter Olympics, including Enrico Fabris, Giorgio Di Centa, Cristian Zorzi, Fulvio Valbusa and Stefano Donagrandi, were interviewed by Panariello during the night.
- Colombian Latin pop singer Shakira was the last guest of the third episode of the Sanremo Music Festival 2006, performing her single "Don't Bother".

=== Fourth night ===
==== Men section ====
Performances of the contestants of the Men section on the fourth night
R/O	Artist(s)	Song	Guest(s)	Result
1	Michele Zarrillo	"L'alfabeto degli amanti"	Tiziano Ferro	Advanced
2	Povia	"Vorrei avere il becco"	Francesco Baccini	Advanced
3	Ron	"L'uomo delle stelle"	Tosca, Loredana Bertè & Cecilia Chailly	Eliminated
4	Alex Britti	"...solo con te"	Max Gazzè, Antonio Santirocco & Mark Hanna	Eliminated

==== Groups section ====
Performances of the contestants of the Groups section on the fourth night
R/O	Artist(s)	Song	Guest(s)	Result
5	Nomadi	"Dove si va"	Roberto Vecchioni	Advanced
6	Zero Assoluto	"Svegliarsi la mattina"	Niccolò Fabi	Advanced
7	Sugarfree	"Solo lei mi dà"	Flavio Oreglio	Eliminated
8	I Ragazzi di Scampia & Gigi Finizio	"Musica e speranza"	Tullio De Piscopo	Eliminated

==== Women section ====
Performances of the contestants of the Women section on the fourth night
R/O	Artist(s)	Song	Guest(s)	Result
9	Anna Tatangelo	"Essere una donna"	Alberto Radius & Ricky Portera	Advanced
10	Nicky Nicolai	"Lei ha la notte"	Stefano Di Battista & Giovanni Allevi	Eliminated
11	Dolcenera	"Com'è straordinaria la vita"	Maurizio Solieri	Advanced
12	Simona Bencini	"Tempesta"	Sarah Jane Morris	Eliminated

==== Newcomers section ====
Performances of the contestants of the Newcomers section on the fourth night
R/O	Artist(s)	Song	Result
13	Monia Russo	"Un mondo senza parole"	Eliminated
14	Tiziano Orecchio	"Preda innocente"	Eliminated
15	L'Aura	"Irraggiungibile"	Eliminated
16	Simone Cristicchi	"Che bella gente"	Advanced
17	Helena Hellwig	"Di luna morirei"	Eliminated
18	Riccardo Maffoni	"Sole negli occhi"	Advanced

==== Guests and other performances ====
- American actor Orlando Bloom was interviewed by Victoria Cabello during the show.
- At the end of the show, American singer-songwriter Gavin DeGraw performed his hit "Chariot".
- Italian actor Arnoldo Foà also appeared for an interview. He also performed an original song.
- Domenico Dolce and Stefano Gabbana appeared on stage with models Marta Cecchetto, Claudia Cedro, Vanessa Hessler and Francesca Lancini. The models wore clothes designed for them by the founders of the fashion house Dolce & Gabbana.

=== Fifth night ===
==== First round ====
Key:

– Contestant competing in the "Men" section.
– Contestant competing in the "Women" section.
– Contestant competing in the "Groups" section.
– Contestant competing in the "Newcomer Artists" section.

Performances of the contestants on the first round of the final
R/O	Artist(s)	Song	Result (section)
1	Povia	"Vorrei avere il becco"	Winner (Men)
2	Michele Zarrillo	"L'alfabeto degli amanti"	Eliminated
3	Nomadi	"Dove si va"	Winner (Groups)
4	Zero Assoluto	"Svegliarsi la mattina"	Eliminated
5	Dolcenera	"Com'è straordinaria la vita"	Eliminated
6	Anna Tatangelo	"Essere una donna"	Winner (Women)
7	Simone Cristicchi	"Che bella gente"	Eliminated
8	Riccardo Maffoni	"Sole negli occhi"	Winner (Newcomers)

==== Second round ====
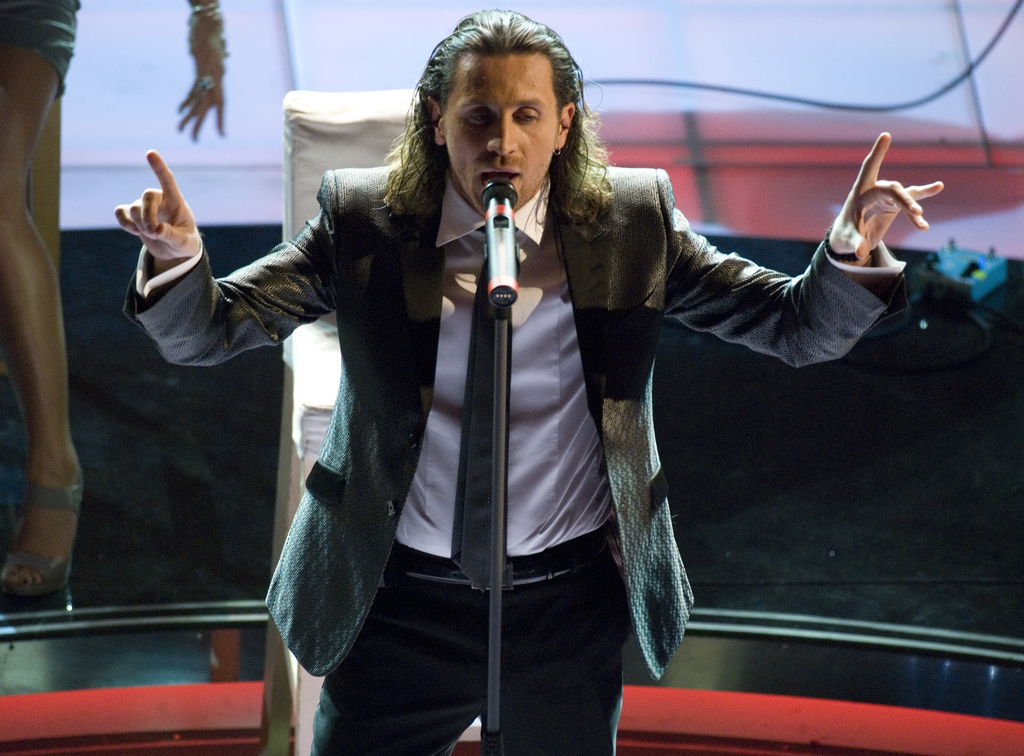
At the end of the second round, Povia was announced the winner of the competition, with his entry "Vorreri avere il becco".

Performances of the contestants on the second round of the final
R/O	Artist(s)	Song	Result (section)
1	Povia	"Vorrei avere il becco"	Winner
2	Nomadi	"Dove si va"	Finalist
3	Anna Tatangelo	"Essere una donna"	Finalist
4	Riccardo Maffoni	"Sole negli occhi"	Finalist

==== Guests and other performances ====
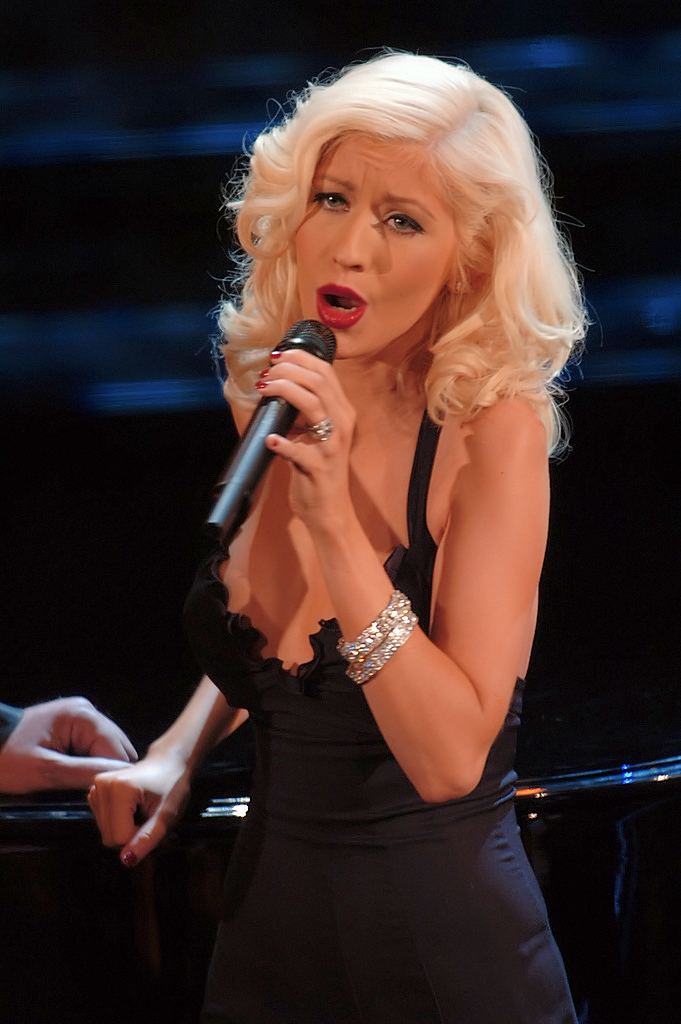
Christina Aguilera performing during the Sanremo 2006 final

- Italian actor Giancarlo Giannini opened the final of the Sanremo Music Festival 2006, performing Domenico Modugno's "Vecchio frac".
- Italian singer Andrea Bocelli performed the song "Il mare calmo della sera", which launched his career and placed first in the Newcomers section of the Sanremo Music Festival in 1994. He also dueted with American singer Christina Aguilera, performing their single "Somos Novios (It's Impossible)".
- Virna Lisi appeared on stage during the first night. She also crowned the winner of the competition.
- Eros Ramazzotti was the second guest, after Bocelli, chosen to represent the most known Italian artists which started their career at the Sanremo Music Festival. He performed a medley of "Terra promessa", "Una storia importante" and "Adesso tu", and he performed the song "I Belong to You (Il ritmo della passione)" as a duet with Anastacia.
- Laura Pausini was the last guest of the night. She performed a medley which included her previous Sanremo Music Festival entries, "La solitudine" (1993) and "Strani amori" (1994), as well as her 2005 single "Come se non fosse stato mai amore". She later performed an Italian-language cover of Charles Aznavour's "She", titled "Uguale a lei".
- At the end of the performances of the competing artists, Ramazzotti and Pausini came back on stage to perform "Nel blu dipinto di blu". The song, which won the contest in 1958, was performed with its original arrangements.

== Other awards ==
=== Critics Award "Mia Martini" ===
Points received by the competing artists for the Critics Award
Artist	Song	Points	Result
Noa, Carlo Fava & Solis String Quartet	"Un discorso in generale"	42	Winner
Mario Venuti & Arancia Sonora	"Un altro posto nel mondo"	24	2nd place
Nomadi	"Dove si va"	12	3rd place
Ron	"L'uomo delle stelle"	12	3rd place
Dolcenera	"Com'è straordinaria la vita"	9	5th place
Nicky Nicolai	"Lei ha la notte"	6	6th place
Simone Cristicchi	"Che bella gente"	5	7th place
Povia	"Vorrei avere il becco"	4	8th place
Michele Zarrillo	"L'alfabeto degli amanti"	4	8th place
L'Aura	"Irraggiungibile"	3	10th place
Anna Oxa	"Processo a me stessa"	3	10th place
Ivan Segreto	"Con un gesto"	3	10th place
Deasonika	"Non dimentico più"	2	13th place
Luca Dirisio	"Sparirò"	2	13th place
Alex Britti	"...solo con te"	1	15th place
Riccardo Maffoni	"Sole negli occhi"	1	15th place
Tiziano Orecchio	"Preda innocente"	1	15th place
I Ragazzi di Scampia & Gigi Finizio	"Musica e speranza"	1	15th place
Anna Tatangelo	"Essere una donna"	1	15th place
Zero Assoluto	"Appena prima di partire"	1	15th place

=== Press, Radio & TV Award ===
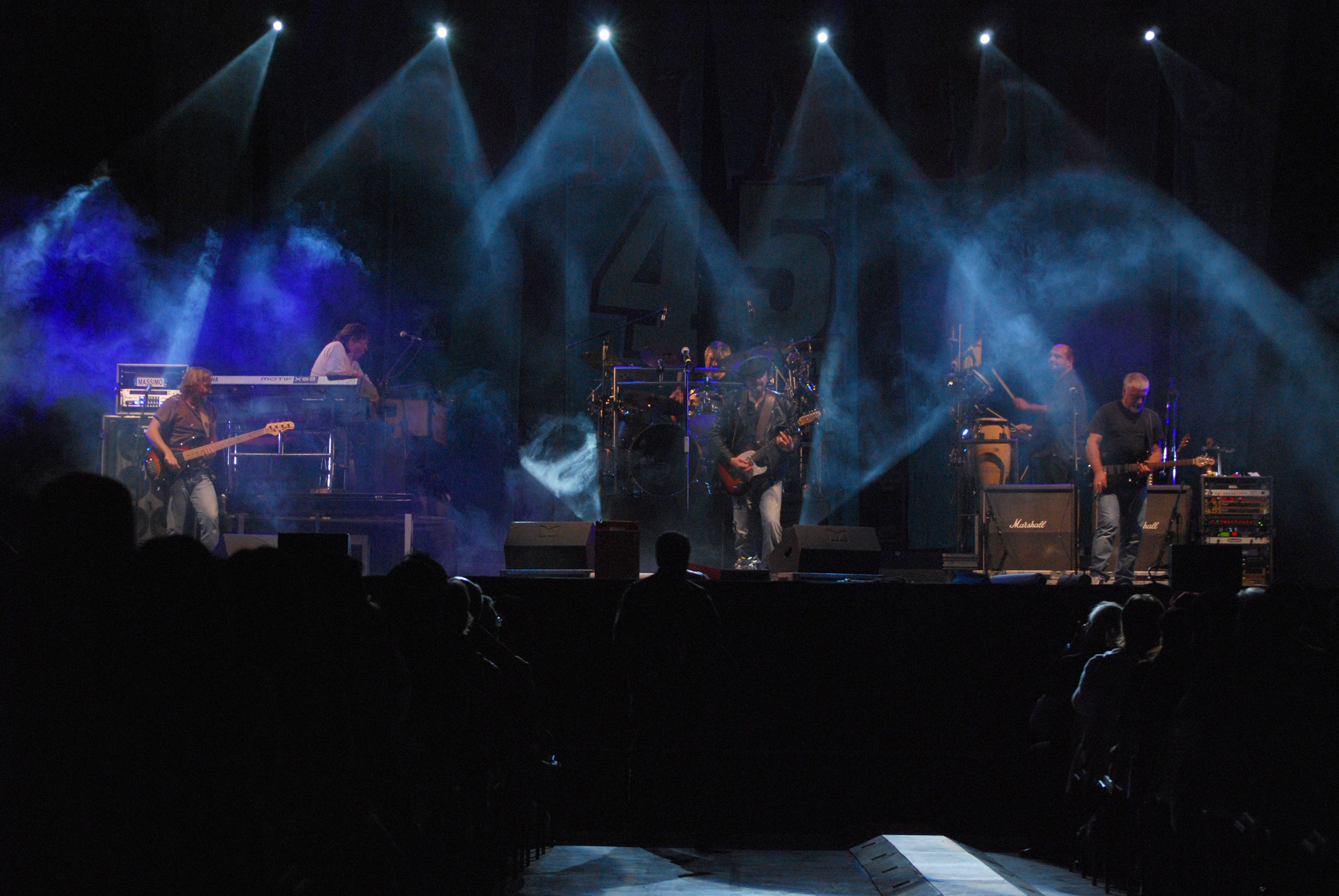
Italian band Nomadi won the Press, Radio & TV Award for the entry "Dove si va".

Points received by the competing artists for the Press, Radio & TV Award
Artist	Song	Points	Result
Nomadi	"Dove si va"	55	Winner
Povia	"Vorrei avere il becco"	—N/a	2nd place
Simone Cristicchi	"Che bella gente"	—N/a	3rd place

== Ratings ==
Episode	Date	Viewers	Share
Night 1	27 February 2006	9,141,000	44.45%
Night 2	28 February 2006	7,271,000	37.33%
Night 3	2 March 2006	6,234,000	33.49%
Night 4	3 March 2006	6,834,000	36.74%
Night 5	4 March 2006	9,523,000	48.23%
