= Sanremo Music Festival 2007 =

Italian song contest (57th edition)

Dates and venue
- Semi-final 1: 27 February 2007
- Semi-final 2: 28 February 2007
- Semi-final 3: 1 March 2007
- Semi-final 4: 2 March 2007
- Final: 3 March 2007
- Venue: Teatro Ariston; Sanremo, Italy

Production
- Broadcaster: Radiotelevisione italiana (RAI)
- Director: Gino Landi
- Musical director: Pippo Caruso
- Artistic director: Pippo Baudo
- Presenters: Pippo Baudo and Michelle Hunziker

Vote
- Voting system: Mixed (popular jury, "quality jury" and televotes)

Big Artists section
- Number of entries: 20
- Winner: "Ti regalerò una rosa" Simone Cristicchi

Newcomers' section
- Number of entries: 14
- Winner: "Pensa"; Fabrizio Moro

The Sanremo Music Festival 2007 (Italian: Festival di Sanremo 2007), officially the 57th Italian Song Festival (57º Festival della canzone italiana), was the 57th Sanremo Music Festival, held at the Teatro Ariston in Sanremo between 27 February 2007 and 3 March 2007 and broadcast by Radiotelevisione italiana (RAI). The contest was presented by Pippo Baudo and Michelle Hunziker.

The competition included two different sections. The Big Artists section, featuring 20 established singers, was won by Simone Cristicchi with the song "Ti regalerò una rosa", while the Newcomers' section, featuring 14 debuting or little known artists, was won by Fabrizio Moro with "Pensa".

== Shows ==
=== First night ===
==== Big Artists and Newcomers section ====
Key:

– Contestant competing in the "Big Artists" section.
– Contestant competing in the "Newcomer Artists" section.

Performances of the contestants on the first night
R/O	Artist(s)	Song	Songwriter(s)	Result
1	Zero Assoluto	"Appena prima di partire"	Matteo Maffucci; Thomas De Gasperi; Enrico Ciarallo; Danilo Paoni	—N/a
2	Piero Mazzocchetti	"Schiavo d'amore"	Maurizio Fabrizio; Guido Morra	—N/a
3	Mariangela	"Ninna nanna"	Gino Magurno; Silvio Magurno; Paolo Bianco	Eliminated
4	Francesco Facchinetti & Roby Facchinetti	"Vivere normale"	Simone Bertolotti; Marco Ciappelli; Diego Calvetti	—N/a
5	Antonella Ruggiero	"Canzone fra le guerre"	Antonella Ruggiero; Cristian Carrara	—N/a
6	Pquadro	"Malinconiche sere"	Giuseppe Di Tella; Bruno Rubino	Advanced
7	Daniele Silvestri	"La paranza"	Daniele Silvestri	—N/a
8	Grandi Animali Marini	"Napoleone Azzurro"	Francesco Ferrari	Eliminated
9	Milva	"The Show Must Go On"	Giorgio Faletti	—N/a
10	Jasmine	"La vita subito"	Renato Zero; Claudio Guidetti; Vincenzo Incenzo; Fio Zanotti	Advanced
11	Simone Cristicchi	"Ti regalerò una rosa"	Simone Cristicchi	—N/a
12	Marco Baroni	"L'immagine che ho di te"	Marco Baroni; Alberto Bertoni	Advanced
13	Nada	"Luna in piena"	Nada Malanima	—N/a
14	Stefano Centomo	"Bivio"	Stefano Centomo; Massimiliano Titi	Advanced
15	Mango	"Chissà se nevica"	Mango; Carlo De Bei	—N/a
16	Khorakhanè	"La ballata di Gino"	Luca Medri; Mario Ulderici	Eliminated
17	Leda Battisti	"Senza me ti pentirai"	Leda Battisti; Andrea Battaglia	—N/a

==== Guests and other performances ====
- At the beginning of the show, co-presenter Michelle Hunziker covered "Adesso tu". The song, originally performed by her ex-husband Eros Ramazzotti, won the contest in 1986.
- Italian comedian Antonio Cornacchione performed a piece of political satire.
- Hunziker performed a song from her musical theatre stage work Tutti insieme appassionatamente, an Italian adaptation of the film The Sound of Music.
- American pop group Scissor Sisters performed the hit "I Don't Feel Like Dancin'".
- American singer-songwriter Norah Jones sang and played piano on her single "Thinking About You".

=== Second night ===
==== Big Artists and Newcomers section ====
Key:

– Contestant competing in the "Big Artists" section.
– Contestant competing in the "Newcomer Artists" section.

Performances of the contestants on the second night
R/O	Artist(s)	Song	Songwriter(s)	Result
1	Paolo Meneguzzi	"Musica"	Pablo Meneguzzo; Disi Melotti; Rosario Di Bella	—N/a
2	Marcella Bella & Gianni Bella	"Forever (Per sempre)"	Gianni Bella; Mogol	—N/a
3	Stadio	"Guardami"	Gaetano Curreri; Saverio Grandi	—N/a
4	Sara Galimberti	"Amore ritrovato"	Roberto Ruocco; Cristina Bozzi	Advanced
5	Tosca	"Il terzo fuochista"	Ruggiero Mascellino; Tosca; Massimo Venturiello	—N/a
6	Patrizio Baù	"Peccati di gola"	Patrizio Baù; Maurizio Bernacchia	Eliminated
7	Johnny Dorelli	"Meglio così"	Gianni Ferrio; Giorgio Calabrese	—N/a
8	Romina Falconi	"Ama"	Manrico Marcucci; Romina Falconi; Marco Randazzo; Simone Ciammarughi	Advanced
9	Albano	"Nel perdono"	Yari Carrisi; Alterisio Paoletti; Renato Zero; Vincenzo Incenzo	—N/a
10	Fabrizio Moro	"Pensa"	Fabrizio Mobrici	Advanced
11	Paolo Rossi	"In Italia si sta male"	Rino Gaetano	—N/a
12	FSC	"Non piangere"	Davide Ferrario; Stefano Spallanzani; Andrea Polato	Eliminated
13	Amalia Grè	"Amami per sempre"	Amalia Grezio; Michele Ranavro; Paola Palma	—N/a
14	Pier Cortese	"Non ho tempo"	Pier Vincenzo Cortese	Eliminated
15	Fabio Concato	"Oltre il giardino"	Fabio Concato	—N/a
16	Elsa Lila	"Il senso della vita"	Maurizio Fabrizio; Guido Morra	Advanced
17	Velvet	"Tutto da rifare"	Pierfrancesco Bazzoffi; Giancarlo Cornetta; Pierluigi Ferrantini; Alessandro Sgreccia	—N/a

==== Guests and other performances ====
- At the beginning of the night, Hunziker and Baudo performed the song "Non ho l'età", which won the competition 1964 being performed by Gigliola Cinquetti.
- Italian comedy duo Ficarra e Picone performed a piece in memory of Pino Puglisi, a priest who was killed by Sicilian Mafia after challenging the criminal syndicate itself.
- British boyband Take That was the first international guest of the night, performing their song "Shine". The band had previously performed as a guest during the Sanremo Music Festival 1996, a few days before splitting.
- American R&B singer-songwriter John Legend sang his single "Save Room", which was performed for the first time during a TV program. Legend also performed his hit "Ordinary People".

=== Third night ===
==== Big Artists section ====
Performances of the contestants on the third night
R/O	Artist(s)	Song	Guest(s)
1	Daniele Silvestri	"La paranza"	Bungt Bangt
2	Milva	"The Show Must Go On"	Enrico Ruggeri
3	Leda Battisti	"Senza me ti pentirai"	Kledi Kadiu & Sabrina Amato
4	Simone Cristicchi	"Ti regalerò una rosa"	Sergio Cammariere
5	Fabio Concato	"Oltre il giardino"	Michele Zarrillo & Tullio De Piscopo
6	Piero Mazzocchetti	"Schiavo d'amore"	Amii Stewart
7	Mango	"Chissà se nevica"	Laura Valente
8	Stadio	"Guardami"	Teresa Salgueiro
9	Zero Assoluto	"Appena prima di partire"	Nelly Furtado & Tomislav Biserov
10	Tosca	"Il terzo fuochista"	Massimo Venturiello
11	Velvet	"Tutto da rifare"	Francesco Sarcina
12	Nada	"Luna in piena"	Cristina Donà
13	Antonella Ruggiero	"Canzone fra le guerre"	Coro Sant'Ilario & Coro Valle Laghi
14	Paolo Meneguzzi	"Musica"	Nate James
15	Albano	"Nel perdono"	Cosmos
16	Paolo Rossi	"In Italia si sta male"	Têtes des Bois
17	Johnny Dorelli	"Meglio così"	Stefano Bollani
18	Francesco Facchinetti & Roby Facchinetti	"Vivere normale"	Anggun
19	Amalia Grè	"Amami per sempre"	Mario Biondi
20	Marcella Bella & Gianni Bella	"Forever (Per sempre)"	The Supremes

==== Guests and other performances ====
- Spanish singer and actor Miguel Ángel Muñoz sang his single "Dirás que estoy loco", with a choreography performed by six dancers.
- Italian comedian Max Tortora impersonated Franco Califano, performing a satirical piece.

=== Fourth night ===
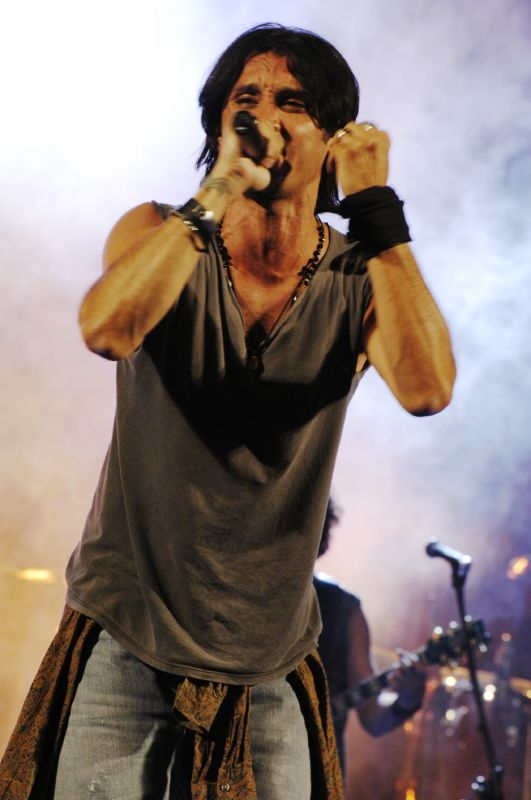
Fabrizio Moro placed first in the Newcomers' section with the song "Pensa".

The running order of the contestants was decided by a drawing at the beginning of the night.

==== Newcomers section ====
Performances of the contestants on the fourth night
R/O	Artist(s)	Song	Result
1	Marco Baroni	"L'immagine che ho di te"	Bottom five
2	Sara Galimberti	"Amore ritrovato"	Bottom five
3	Elsa Lila	"Il senso della vita"	Bottom five
4	Pquadro	"Malinconiche sere"	Third place
5	Fabrizio Moro	"Pensa"	Winner
6	Stefano Centono	"Bivio"	Second place
7	Romina Falconi	"Ama"	Bottom five
8	Jasmine	"La vita subito"	Bottom five

==== Guests and other performances ====
- Spanish actress Penélope Cruz was interviewed by Pippo Baudo during the night.
- Franco Battiato performed his songs "La cura", "I giorni della monotonia" and "Il vuoto", together with Mab, a hard rock band produced by Battiato himself.
- Gigi D'Alessio performed a cover of Lucio Battisti's "Il nastro rosa". He also played piano while Lara Fabian sang Tomaso Albinoni's "Adagio". Finally, D'Alessio and Fabian duetted, performing Battisti's "Un cuore malato".
- Elisa performed her singles "Luce (Tramonti a nord est)", which won the contest in 2001, and "Eppure sentire", as well as a cover of Mia Martini's "Almeno tu nell'universo".
- Renato Zero tributed Italian singer-songwriters Luigi Tenco, Bruno Lauzi and Sergio Endrigo, performing a medley of "Ciao amore, ciao", "Ritornerai" and "Era d'estate". He also sang a medley of his hits "Il carrozzone", "Ave Maria" and "Il cielo".
- Gianna Nannini performed the songs "Dolente Pia" and "Mura Mura" from her musical Pia come la canto io, inspired by Pia de' Tolomei, a historical character also appearing in Dante Alighieri's Divine Comedy.
- Tiziano Ferro performed his songs "Ed ero contentissimo", "Ti scatterò una foto", "Sere nere" and "Non me lo so spiegare".
- Italian actor Neri Marcorè impersonated Luciano Ligabue, performing "L'IVA", a satirical cover of his song "Viva".
- Armando Trovajoli also appeared, receiving an award given by the Italian Society of Authors and Publishers.

=== Fifth night ===
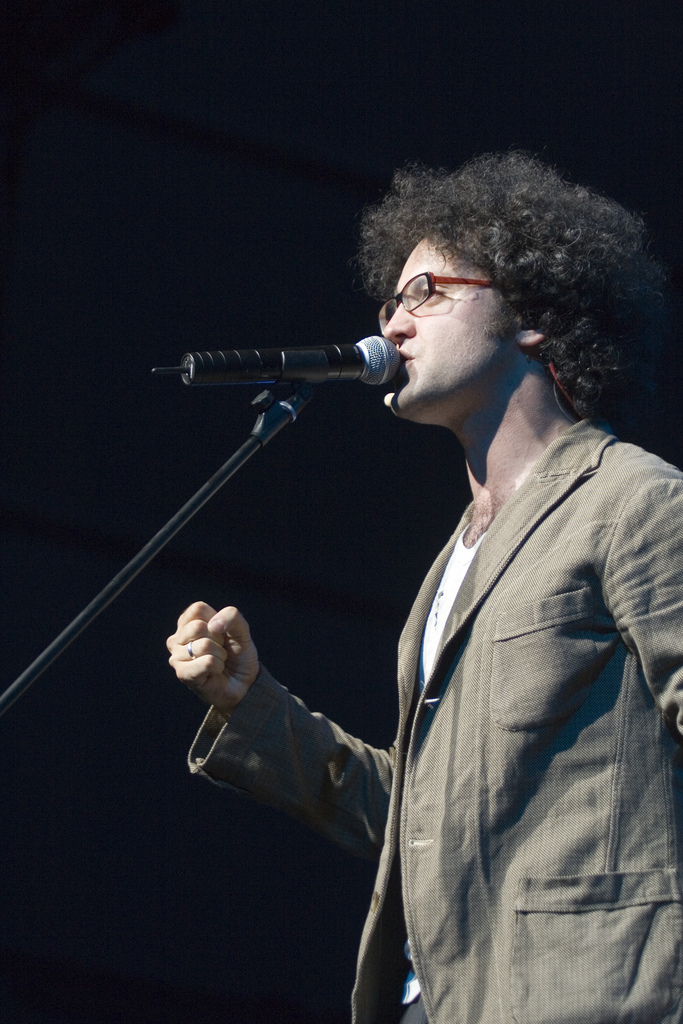
Simone Cristicchi won the main competition with his entry "Ti regalerò una rosa".

==== Big Artists section ====
Performances of the contestants on the fifth night
R/O	Artist(s)	Song	Result
1	Nada	"Luna in piena"	Bottom ten
2	Paolo Rossi	"In Italia si sta male"	Bottom ten
3	Velvet	"Tutto da rifare"	Bottom ten
4	Johnny Dorelli	"Meglio così"	Bottom ten
5	Albano	"Nel perdono"	2nd place
6	Amalia Gré	"Amami per sempre"	Bottom ten
7	Marcella Bella & Gianni Bella	"Forever (per sempre)"	Bottom ten
8	Mango	"Chissà se nevica"	5th place
9	Tosca	"Il terzo fuochista"	7th place
10	Fabio Concato	"Oltre il giardino"	Bottom ten
11	Francesco Facchinetti & Roby Facchinetti	"Vivere normale"	8th place
12	Leda Battisti	"Senza me ti pentirai"	Bottom ten
13	Simone Cristicchi	"Ti regalerò una rosa"	Winner
14	Stadio	"Guardami"	Bottom ten
15	Daniele Silvestri	"La paranza"	4th place
16	Zero Assoluto	"Appena prima di partire"	9th place
17	Milva	"The Show Must Go On"	Bottom ten
18	Piero Mazzocchetti	"Schiavo d'amore"	3rd place
19	Antonella Ruggiero	"Canzone fra le guerre"	10th place
20	Paolo Meneguzzi	"Musica"	6th place

==== Guests and other performances ====
- Italian television presenter Mike Bongiorno opened the show with Michelle Hunziker. Bongiorno presented the Sanremo Music Festival 11 times during the previous years. Since Baudo presented the show for the twelfth time in 2007, overtaking Bongiorno's record, Bongiorno was invited to tie Baudo's number of appearances during the contest.
- British singer Joss Stone performed her single "Tell Me 'bout It" and tributed Aretha Franklin covering "Respect".
- Mika also appeared during the final night, singing his hit "Grace Kelly".
- Italian TV presenter and actor Flavio Insinna was another guest of the show, performing some short comedy scenes with Pippo Baudo.

== Other awards ==
=== Critics Award "Mia Martini" ===
==== Big Artists section ====
Points received by the "Big Artists" for the Critics Award
Artist	Song	Points	Result
Simone Cristicchi	"Ti regalerò una rosa"	62	Winner
Nada	"Luna in piena"	11	2nd place
Tosca	"Il terzo fuochista"	10	3rd place
Albano	"Nel perdono"	5	4th place
Antonella Ruggiero	"Canzone fra le guerre"	4	5th place
Johnny Dorelli	"Meglio così"	3	6th place
Paolo Rossi	"In Italia si sta male"	3	6th place
Daniele Silvestri	"La paranza"	3	6th place
Milva	"The Show Must Go On"	2	9th place
Marcella Bella & Gianni Bella	"Forever (Per sempre)"	1	10th place
Fabio Concato	"Oltre il giardino"	1	10th place
Piero Mazzocchetti	"Schiavo d'amore"	1	10th place
Paolo Meneguzzi	"Musica"	1	10th place
Velvet	"Tutto da rifare"	0	14th place
Amalia Gré	"Amami per sempre"	0	14th place
Mango	"Chissà se nevica"	0	14th place
Francesco Facchinetti & Roby Facchinetti	"Vivere normale"	0	14th place
Leda Battisti	"Senza me ti pentirai"	0	14th place
Stadio	"Guardami"	0	14th place
Zero Assoluto	"Appena prima di partire"	0	14th place

==== Newcomers section ====
Points received by the "Newcomer Artists" for the Critics Award
Artist	Song	Points	Result
Fabrizio Moro	"Pensa"	68	Winner
Khorakhanè	"La ballata di Gino"	6	2nd place
Pquadro	"Malinconiche sere"	6	2nd place
Romina Falconi	"Ama"	4	4th place
Sara Galimberti	"Amore ritrovato"	4	4th place
FSC	"Non piangere"	3	6th place
Marco Baroni	"L'immagine che ho di te"	3	6th place
Stefano Centomo	"Bivio"	3	6th place
Elsa Lila	"Il senso della vita"	2	9th place
Mariangela	"Ninna nanna"	2	9th place
Patrizio Baù	"Peccati di gola"	1	11th place
Grandi Animali Marini	"Napoleone azzurro"	1	11th place
Jasmine	"La vita subito"	1	11th place
Pier Cortese	"Non ho tempo"	0	14th place

=== Press, Radio & TV Award ===
==== Big Artists section ====
Points received by the "Big Artists" for the Press, Radio & TV Award
Artist	Song	Points	Result
Simone Cristicchi	"Ti regalerò una rosa"	20	Winner
Daniele Silvestri	"La paranza"	9	2nd place
Mango	"Chissà se nevica"	5	3rd place
Milva	"The Show Must Go On"	5	3rd place
Zero Assoluto	"Appena prima di partire"	5	3rd place
Piero Mazzocchetti	"Schiavo d'amore"	4	6th place
Albano	"Nel perdono"	3	7th place
Stadio	"Guardami"	3	7th place
Tosca	"Il terzo fuochista"	2	9th place
Paolo Rossi	"In Italia si sta male"	2	9th place
Antonella Ruggiero	"Canzone fra le guerre"	2	9th place
Amalia Grè	"Amami per sempre"	1	12th place
Paolo Meneguzzi	"Musica"	1	12th place
Johnny Dorelli	"Meglio così"	1	12th place
Leda Battisti	"Senza me ti pentirai"	1	12th place
Francesco Facchinetti & Roby Facchinetti	"Vivere normale"	1	12th place
Velvet	"Tutto da rifare"	1	12th place
Nada	"Luna in piena"	0	18th place
Marcella Bella & Gianni Bella	"Forever (Per sempre)"	0	18th place
Fabio Concato	"Oltre il giardino"	0	18th place

==== Newcomers section ====
Points received by the "Newcomer Artists" for the Press, Radio & TV Award
Artist	Song	Points	Result
Fabrizio Moro	"Pensa"	28	Winner
Pquadro	"Malinconiche sere"	13	2nd place
Stefano Centomo	"Bivio"	7	3rd place
Jasmine	"La vita subito"	4	4th place
Sara Galimberti	"Amore ritrovato"	4	4th place
Romina Falconi	"Ama"	3	6th place
Marco Baroni	"L'immagine che ho di te"	2	7th place
Khorakhanè	"La ballata di Gino"	2	7th place
Grandi Animali Marini	"Napoleone azzurro"	1	9th place
Elsa Lila	"Il senso della vita"	1	9th place
Pier Cortese	"Non ho tempo"	0	11th place
Patrizio Baù	"Peccati di gola"	0	11th place
FSC	"Non piangere"	0	11th place
Mariangela	"Ninna nanna"	0	11th place

== Ratings ==
Episode	Date	Viewers	Share
Night 1	27 February 2007	9,760,000	44.82%
Night 2	28 February 2007	8,896,000	46.37%
Night 3	1 March 2007	8,945,000	42.88%
Night 4	2 March 2007	8,304,000	45.86%
Night 5	3 March 2007	10,580,000	54.27%
