= Ragazza di periferia =

Studio album by Anna Tatangelo
- Released: 14 March 2005
- Genre: Pop
- Length: 40:28
- Language: Italian
- Labels: G&G

Anna Tatangelo chronology
Attimo x attimo (2003)	Ragazza di periferia (2005)	Mai dire mai (2007)

Ragazza di periferia is the second album by Italian singer Anna Tatangelo, released on 14 March 2005. It was re-released in March 2006 with two new tracks: "Essere una donna" (winner in the women's category at the Sanremo Music Festival 2006) and "Colpo di fulmine".

== Track listing ==
1. "Quando due si lasciano" (V. D'Agostino, G. D'Alessio) 3:35
2. "Dimmi dimmi" (V. D'Agostino, G. D'Alessio, A. Pennino) 3:40
3. "Ragazza di periferia" (V. D'Agostino, G. D'Alessio, A. Pennino) 4:18
4. "Non tradirmi mai" (G. Di Tella, B. Rubino, A. Pennino) 4:23
5. "Pensiero stupendo" (V. D'Agostino, G. D'Alessio) 4:46
6. "Qualcosa di te" (A. Galbiati, C. Chiodo) 4:27
7. "Sotto un cielo di stelle" (W.C. Farias, J.A. Farias, R.E. Farias) 4:11
8. "Così è l'amore" (L. Oriundo, L. D'Alessio, A. Pennino) 4:02
9. "Andrea" (A. Rich, F. Cavalli, A. Galbiati) 3:46
10. "O te o me" (L. Sacchezin, V. D'Agostino, L. Chiaravalli) 3:15

Re-release track listing

1. "Essere una donna" (Mogol, G. D'Alessio) 4:03
2. "Colpo di fulmine" (M. Greco, F. Camba) 3:30

== Personnel ==
- Anna Tatangelo – vocals
- Maurizio Fiordiliso – guitar, backing vocals
- Adriano Pennino – keyboards, piano, programming
- Roberto D'Aquino – bass
- Biagio Sturiale – electric guitar
- Giordano Moretti – keyboards, programming
- Luca Chiaravalli – keyboards, programming
- Paolo Costa – bass
- Alfredo Golino – drums
- Cesare Chiodo – bass
- Rossella Ruini – backing vocals
- Fabrizio Palma – backing vocals
- Valeria Guida – backing vocals
- Michela Montalto – backing vocals

== Charts ==
Chart performance for Ragazza di periferia
Chart (2006)	Peak position
Italian Albums (FIMI)	15
