= Nel mondo delle donne =

Studio album by Anna Tatangelo
- Released: 28 November 2008
- Genre: Pop
- Length: 42:14
- Language: Italian
- Label: GGD

Anna Tatangelo chronology
Mai dire mai (2007)	Nel mondo delle donne (2008)	Progetto B (2011)

Singles from Nel mondo delle donne
- 1. "Profumo di mamma" Released: 4 November 2008; 2. "Rose spezzate" Released: 30 January 2009; 3. "Va da lei" Released: 2009; 4. "Sarai" Released: 2009; 5. "Adesso" Released: 2009

Nel mondo delle donne is the fourth album by Italian singer Anna Tatangelo, released on 28 November 2008.

== Track listing ==
1. "Profumo di mamma" (Gigi D'Alessio) 3:37
2. "Adesso" (G. D'Alessio, A. Pennino) 3:32
3. "Va' da lei" (G. D'Alessio) 3:43
4. "Sarai" with Gigi D'Alessio (G. D'Alessio, P. Daniele) 4:15
5. "Rose spezzate" (E. Rossi) 3:42
6. "Il posto mio" (A. Testa, T. Renis) 3:17
7. "Quando arriva arriva" (A. Mancuso) 3:38
8. "Lei che ne sa" (A. Mancuso) 3:47
9. "Un nuovo sentimento" (E. Rossi) 4:20
10. "Questa notte di magia" (E. Rossi) 4:08
11. "Anna verrà" (P. Daniele) 4:10

== Charts ==
Chart performance for Nel mondo delle donne
Chart (2008)	Peak position
Italian Albums (FIMI)	22
Swiss Albums (Schweizer Hitparade)	88
