= Attimo x attimo =

Studio album by Anna Tatangelo
- Released: August 28, 2003
- Genre: Pop
- Length: 48:57
- Language: Italian, Neapolitan
- Label: Capitol

Anna Tatangelo chronology
Attimo x attimo (2003)	Ragazza di periferia (2005)

Singles from Attimo x attimo
- 1. "Doppiamente fragili" Released: 8 March 2002; 2. "Un nuovo bacio" Released: 15 May 2002; 3. "Volere volare" Released: 12 March 2003; 4. "Corri" Released: 28 August 2003; 5. "Attimo x attimo" Released: 15 November 2003; 6. "L'amore più grande che c'è" Released: 22 April 2004

Attimo x attimo (Attimo per attimo) is the debut studio album by Italian singer Anna Tatangelo.

The title track, "Attimo x attimo", was originally written for Mia Martini, but because of her death, never got the chance to record it.

== Track listing ==
Attimo x attimo track listing
No.	Title	Writer(s)	Length
1.	"Corri"	Luca Paolo Chiaravalli; Annalisa Sacchezin	3:54
2.	"Tu 6 bellissimo"	Davide Scudieri; Fernando Scudieri	4:56
3.	"Little Boy"	Chiaravalli; Biagio Sturiale; Sacchezin	4:23
4.	"Se amore è"	Chiaravalli; Sacchezin	4:00
5.	"Attimo x attimo"	Fio Zanotti; Francesca Volpini	4:17
6.	"Volere volare" (featuring Federico Stragà)	Bungaro; Claudio Passavanti	4:19
7.	"Vicino a te"	Chiaravalli; Sacchezin	4:01
8.	"L'amore più grande che c'è"	Chiaravalli; Zanotti; Sacchezin	4:33
9.	"Un nuovo bacio" (featuring Gigi D'Alessio)	Gigi D'Alessio; Vincenzo D'Agostino	4:15
10.	"El paso pobre"	Chiaravalli; Zanotti; Sacchezin	4:07
11.	"Doppiamente fragili"	David Marchetti; Marco Del Freo; Chiaravalli; Sacchezin	3:54
12.	"Tu sì 'na cosa grande"	Roberto Gigli; Domenico Modugno	2:13

== Charts ==
Chart performance for Attimo x attimo
Chart (2003)	Peak position
Italian Albums (FIMI)	68
