= Semplicemente =

Semplicemente may refer to:

- "Semplicemente" (Zero Assoluto song), 2005
- "Semplicemente" (Sarah Toscano and Mida song), 2025
