= Anna Tatangelo =

Italian singer and television personality (born 1987)

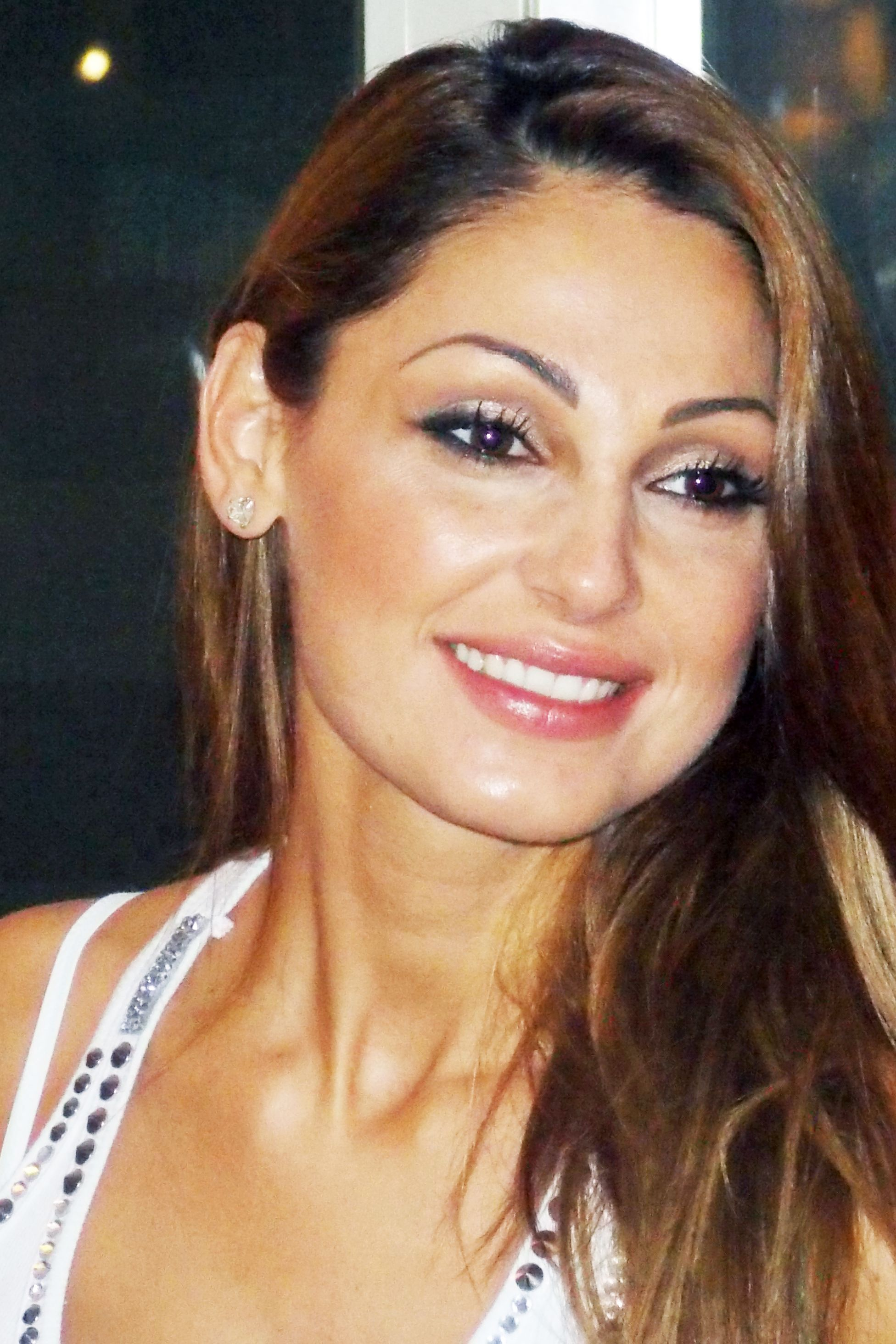
- Tatangelo in 2013

Background information
- Born: 9 January 1987 (age 39); Sora, Lazio, Italy
- Genres: Pop; dance-pop
- Occupations: Singer; television personality
- Years active: 2002–present
- Labels: GGD; Sony BMG
- Website: annatatangelo.net

Anna Tatangelo (born 9 January 1987) is an Italian singer and television personality. At the age of 15, she became the youngest person to win the Newcomer's Award at the prestigious Sanremo Music Festival singing contest. Her repertoire consists mainly of pop music with slight influences of neo-melodic in some of the songs composed for her by singer Gigi D'Alessio, but also in the fifth fusion albums Progetto B. She confronted several social issues and current affairs, such as the empowerment of women, homophobia, anorexia and violence against women. Since 2007 she also wrote some songs. She participated in the Sanremo Music Festival six times in ten years, winning in 2002 with the song "Doppiamente fragile" and getting on the podium three more times: in 2005, when she came third in the category "Women" with "Ragazza di periferia", in 2006, when she came third overall and first in the women category with "Essere una donna" and in 2008 when, with the song "Il mio amico", she has reached the second position. The last was in 2011 with the song "Bastardo".

She has been in a romantic relationship with the singer Gigi D'Alessio from February 2005 to March 2020. Up to date she has sold nearly 1 million copies worldwide.

== Biography ==
Anna Tatangelo was born in Sora to a family of producers of ciambella, a traditional bagel. Since 1994, age 7, she began to take part in several shows in provincial and regional contests, collecting numerous placements, such as in 1999, where she placed second with "Minifestival della canzone" of Viterbo, which she won a year later. In 2001 she participated in the concert "La nota d'oro di Blera", won the traveling "Bravissimi in tour" stop in Sora and also won the national final of Cassano. Again, she won second place in the final of the competition "Una voce per ... " and another victory to" Castelliri in Musica. " In August of that year, at age 14, she was selected by Rai for "Girofestival" where she presented her first song titled, "Dov’è il coraggio" ("Where is the Courage") and came third in the newcomers section and was selected to perform at the Nuove voci per Sanremo (New Voices of Sanremo) Festival in Gropparello. For the same song she shot her first music video and also signed her first record deal (with the CSB Italy – Casalba). She perfected her style at the Music Academy of Sora, where she played for the youth choir in concert. In September of that year she participated and won the academy's Song of Sanremo with the song Angelo of Syria: with this victory comes right in the cast of the youth category of the Sanremo Music Festival in 2002.

=== Attimo per attimo ===
In 2002, Tatangelo became the youngest person at 15 years old to win the Sanremo Music Festival's Newcomer's Award. Pippo Baudo chooses as co-host transmission "Sanremo Top", along with Silvia Mezzanotte, with the winner Matia Bazar. In the same year a duet with Gigi D'Alessio in "Un nuovo bacio", reaching ninth place among the best-selling singles. In July, she took part at the XVII World Youth Day, playing Amazing Grace with Tiziano Ferro, Raf, and Antonella Ruggiero in Piazza San Pietro . In 2003 Tatangelo at Sanremo Music Festival returns, this time in the Big, paired with Federico Stragà, with the song "Volere volare", signed by Claudioeg Bungaro and Claudio Passavanti. Summer Run preceded by the single comes out in August 2003 his first album, entitled Attimo per attimo produced by Fio Zanotti, the piece that gives the title track is a song originally written by the same Zanotti for Mia Martini, who died before to run it. From the album, as well as Corri, it extracts the same Attimo per attimo and L'amore più grande che c'è. In 2004 she was chosen by Disney to sing with Gigi D'Alessio in Il mondo è mio, the soundtrack of the animated film Aladdin. In the same year, as well as working with several concerts of his first official tour, established a collaboration with the Video Italia channel: she was entrusted with the band for the afternoon Playlist Italy introduce such interviews, and live video programs requested by viewers of Live Italy. Tatangelo collaborates with Video Italia for two years.

=== Ragazza di periferia ===
In 2005, at eighteen, she participated for the third time at the Sanremo Music Festival with "Ragazza di periferia", a song written by Gigi D'Alessio with Vincenzo D'Agostino and Adriano Pennino. The song will be classified third in the category Women and weeks after the position reaches number 16 in the ranking of best-selling singles in Italy. By participating in the Festival will also quit the singer's second album, also titled "Ragazza di periferia". Two songs on the album (Dimmi dimmi e Quando dua si lasciano) are included in the soundtrack of the movie "Troppo belli". In July, after graduating from high school, Tatangelo starts on Tour in 2005, which includes several dates throughout Italy. When two are left is the new single. On 23 September the same year she participates in an O'scià and Italian pop music festival conceived by Claudio Baglioni and, during the same month, is the third single from the album, Qualcosa di te. In December, the host of the tour to Australia by Gigi D'Alessio. In 2006 Tatangelo her debut on records in Brazil and South America and get flattering criticism from European and French in particular. For the fourth time in five years, participated in the 56th Sanremo Music Festival with "Essere una donna", a song composed by Mogol and Gigi D'Alessio. During the course of the event on the evening of duets, performing a reworked version of the song, accompanied by Alberto Radius and Ricky Portera. The song won in the category Women and this statement allows her to participate in the final vote, where it ranks third. The song reached the fourth position in the FIMI. With the fourth participation in the Festival also comes a reissue of the album Ragazza di periferia, to which is added to the song San Remo and the brand "Colpo di fulmine", becoming one of the catchphrases of the summer 2006. The album was certified platinum with 150.000 copies sold. In summer, toured Italy with the summer tour and is awarded to the first in Venice Music Awards for Female Revelation 2006. In September, participating for the second consecutive year, the Festival O' scià.

=== Mai dire mai ===
Preceded by the single "Averti qui" arrives on 2 November, after a wait of two years, the third album titled "Mai dire mai", which represents the Tatangelo his debut as a writer: his people are the texts of the already mentioned here and Averti qui e Lo so che finirà, the album, which also sees the contribution of Gaetano Curreri of the Stadio, along with author Saverio Grandi Cosa ne sai, reached the sixth position of the FIMI and in November for a week also enters the Billboard European Hot 100, a prestigious list of 100 best-selling albums in Europe, the eightieth position, in addition to this unique Italian album of Eros Ramazzotti e ². Between October and November of that year, Tatangelo was a guest in the American tour of Gigi D'Alessio. The second single from the album, from 23 November, I know it will end, accompanied by a video shot in San Francisco during the American tour under the direction of Gaetano Morbioli. The song, with over 18,000 downloads and reaches a gold record. The year 2008 saw its fifth participation in the Sanremo Festival, where it ranks second with the song "Il mio amico", dedicated to a gay friend of the singer. The song reaches the second position in the ranking of best-selling singles and was certified platinum. Anna, duet with Michael Bolton and the same is inserted in the repackaging of the duet Mai dire mai, published on 29 February, who has since passed 130,000 copies and also reached platinum status. In March, begins his first theater tour throughout Italy, which received huge acclaim, and 17 May on the summer tour dates with more than fifty throughout Italy and one in Switzerland (Zurich), in September. On 30 May, extracts the new single "mai dire mai".

=== Nel mondo delle donne ===
On 7 November 2008 the new single "Profumo di mamma", the song anticipates the release of the new disc, which occurred on 28 November, titled in the world of women, a concept album entirely focused on the female. The album after only one month is certified platinum with over 100,000 copies sold. From 30 January enters the second single chosen radio airplay for the album, Rose broken song of protest against the abuse of women. With this single, the artist joins the association "Doppia difesa" of Michelle Hunziker and Giulia Bongiorno, and on 5 February, on the cover of TV Smiles and Songs with the same Hunziker, says it will donate the proceeds arising from the above download the song foundation. In June 2009, contributes to the mega-concert at the San Siro stadium in Milan in favor of victims of the L'Aquila earthquake of 2009. The charity initiative called Friends for Abruzzo is the brainchild of Laura Pausini and involves other female singers of Italian music. While giving his adherence Anna Tatangelo can not attend the event, however, on 21 June for health reasons. On 27 November 2009 he released QPGA, album Claudio Baglioni in which the song "Due universi" is sung in duet with Tatangelo and Gigi D'Alessio.

=== Reality TV ===
In 2010 the singer participates in as a judge, the fourth edition of X Factor: Anna Tatangelo is entrusted with the Women 16/24, driving with the help of Adriano Pennino as a vocal coach. On 10 December 2010, with Valeria Marini and Gigi D'Alessio, publishes the compilation 3 x Te, project whose proceeds are intended to be donated to the associations Noi come voi, Doppia difesa and Amri In 2011 Anna Tatangelo is participating for the sixth time in Sanremo Music Festival with a song of which he is co-author, Bastardo, a rock ballad, with which it to the finals and is ranked ninth. The performances of the song are the most-watched by viewers of the 2011 according to Auditel (with 17.088 million contacts in one evening at onset). In conjunction with participation in the festival the singer is published 16 February 2011, the fifth album titled Project B. The album contains 12 previously unreleased songs and a re-interpretation of "Mamma", the song by Cesare Andrea Bixio chosen by the artist for the evening's special festival for the 150 anniversary of the unification of Italy. Among the authors of the songs on the album appear that Mario Biondi and signature Se e L'aria che respiro, the latter a duet sung by Tatangelo and published on 1 April as the second single, and Renato Zero, who wrote the song dedicated to the artist, Anna. On 22 March the Mondadori publishes the autobiography of Anna Tatangelo "Ragazza di periferia, La mia piccola favola". In May of that year he took part in the Wind Music Awards and the tour begins. Senses comes out on 24 June, the third single from Progetto B, accompanied by a video directed by Cosimo Alemà previewed on the site of ANSA and published by 27 June. In 2012, Tatangelo was teamed with Stefano Di Filippo in the eighth season of Ballando con le Stelle (the Italian version of Dancing with the Stars), broadcast on Rai Uno and hosted by Milly Carlucci with Paolo Belli. They placed third overall in the competition and won a standing ovation from judges and the public. Won boogie woogie Award, which goes annually to the couple who ran the ball better. Take part in Dancing with you where he won the team battle in Bobo Vieri team and ranks second in the Champions League.

On 15 June 2012 Anna performed at the studios' Interlomas "of Mexico City as a guest in the concert Gigi D'Alessio singing "Un nuovo bacio" and "Lo so che finirà" in Spanish. In September 2012, Anna flew to Egypt for a photoshoot and a TV transmission on travel and she was judge of Miss Italy on 9 and 10 September.

Anna has won the second edition of Celebrity Masterchef in 2018. Her new album, "La fortuna sia con me", will be a success in Italy.

On 2020 Anna has released her new trap single, Guapo, featuring Geolier. This single is a very famous in Italy and has reached almost 11 million views on YouTube and 4 million streams on Spotify.

== Discography ==
=== Studio albums ===
List of albums, with chart positions and certifications
Title	Album details	Peak chart positions	
Title	Album details	ITA	SWI
Attimo x attimo	Released: 28 August 2003; Label: Capitol, EMI	68	—
Ragazza di periferia	Released: 14 March 2005; Label: G&G, Universal Music	15	—
Mai dire mai	Released: 2 November 2007; Label: GGD, Sony Music	6	—
Nel mondo delle donne	Released: 28 November 2008; Label: GGD, Sony Music	22	88
Progetto B	Released: 16 February 2011; Label: GGD, Sony Music	9	65
Libera	Released: 12 February 2015; Label: GGD, Sony Music	19	—
La fortuna sia con me	Released: 8 February 2019; Label: GGD, Sony Music	30	—
Anna zero	Released: 28 May 2021; Label: GGD, Sony Music	—	—

=== Singles ===
- "Dov'è il coraggio" (promotional CD, not released commercially) (2001)
- "Doppiamente fragili" (2002)
- "Un nuovo bacio" (2002)
- "Volere volare" (2003)
- "Corri" (2003)
- "L'amore più grande che c'è" (2004)
- "Ragazza di periferia" (2005)
- "Quando due si lasciano" (2005)
- "Qualcosa di te" (2005)
- "Essere una donna" (2006)
- "Colpo di fulmine" (2006)
- "Averti qui" (2007)
- "Lo so che finirà" (2007)
- "Il mio amico" (2008)
- "Mai dire mai" (2008)
- "Profumo di mamma" (2008)
- "Rose spezzate" (2009)
- "Bastardo" (2012)
- "L'aria che respiro" (2012)
- "Sensi" (2012)
- "Occhio per occhio" (2013)
- "Senza dire che" (2014)
- "Muchacha" (2014)
- "Libera" (2015)
- "Inafferrabile" (2015)
- "Gocce di cristallo" (2015)
- "Natale italiano" (2017)
- "Chiedere scusa" (2018)
- "Ragazza di periferia 2.0" (2018)
- "Le nostre anime di notte" (2019)
- "Perdona" (2019)
- "Tutto ciò che serve" (2019)
- “La fortuna sia con me” (2020)
- “Guapo” (2020)
- "Fra me e te" (2020)
- "Serenata" (2021)
- "Sangria" (2021)

=== Duets ===
- "Un nuovo bacio" (2002, with Gigi D'Alessio)
- "Volere volare" (2003, with Federico Stragà)
- "Il mondo è mio" (2004, with Gigi D'Alessio)
- "Il mio amico" (2008, with Michael Bolton)
- "Sarai" (2008, with Gigi D'Alessio)
- "L'aria che respiro" (2012, with Mario Biondi)
- "'O core e na femmina" (2017, with Gigi D'Alessio)

== Filmography ==
=== Films ===
Year	Title	Role	Notes
2005	Troppo belli	Herself (extra)	Uncredited extra
2016	Un Natale al Sud	Eva	Feature film debut as an actress

=== Television ===
Year	Title	Role	Notes
2001	Sanremo Giovani 2001	Contestant	Annual music festival
2002	Sanremo Music Festival 2002	Contestant	Performing "Doppiamente fragili" (winner)
2003	Sanremo Music Festival 2003	Contestant	Performing "Volere volare" (17th place)
2005	Sanremo Music Festival 2005	Contestant	Performing "Ragazza di periferia" (12th place)
2006	Sanremo Music Festival 2006	Contestant	Performing "Essere una donna" (3rd place)
2006, 2012	Miss Italia	Judge	Annual beauty contest
2008	Sanremo Music Festival 2008	Contestant	Performing "Il mio amico" (2nd place)
2010	The X Factor Italy	Coach	Talent show (season 4)
2011	Sanremo Music Festival 2011	Contestant	Performing "Bastardo" (9th place)
2012	Ballando con le Stelle	Contestant	Dance talent show (season 8); 2nd place
2014–2016	Capodanno con Gigi D'Alessio	Herself	Annual variety event
2015	Sanremo Music Festival 2015	Contestant	Performing "Libera" (17th place)
2015–2016	About Love	Host	Reality show
2016–2017	I migliori anni	Regular guest	Game show (seasons 7–8)
2018	Celebrity MasteChef Italia	Contestant	Cooking contest (season 2); winner
2019	Sanremo Music Festival 2019	Contestant	Performing "Le nostre anime di notte" (22nd place)
2020–2021	All Together Now	Judge	Talent show (season 3–4)
2021	Name That Tune	Contestant	Game show (season 2)

== Participation at Sanremo Festivals ==
Year	Song	Category	Place
2002	"Doppiamente fragili"	Giovani (Youth)	1
2003	"Volere volare" with Federico Stragà	Big	17
2005	"Ragazza di periferia"	Donne (Women)	3
2006	"Essere una donna"	Donne (Women)	1
2006	"Essere una donna"	Big	3
2008	"Il mio amico"	Big	2
2011	"Bastardo"	Big	9
2015	"Libera"	Big	19
2019	"Le nostre anime di notte"	Big	21

Awards and achievements
Preceded by Gazosa with "Stai con me (Forever)"	Sanremo Music Festival; Winner Newcomers section 2002	Succeeded by Dolcenera with "Siamo tutti là fuori"
