= Bella's Italian Bakery =

Bakery in Portland, Oregon, U.S.

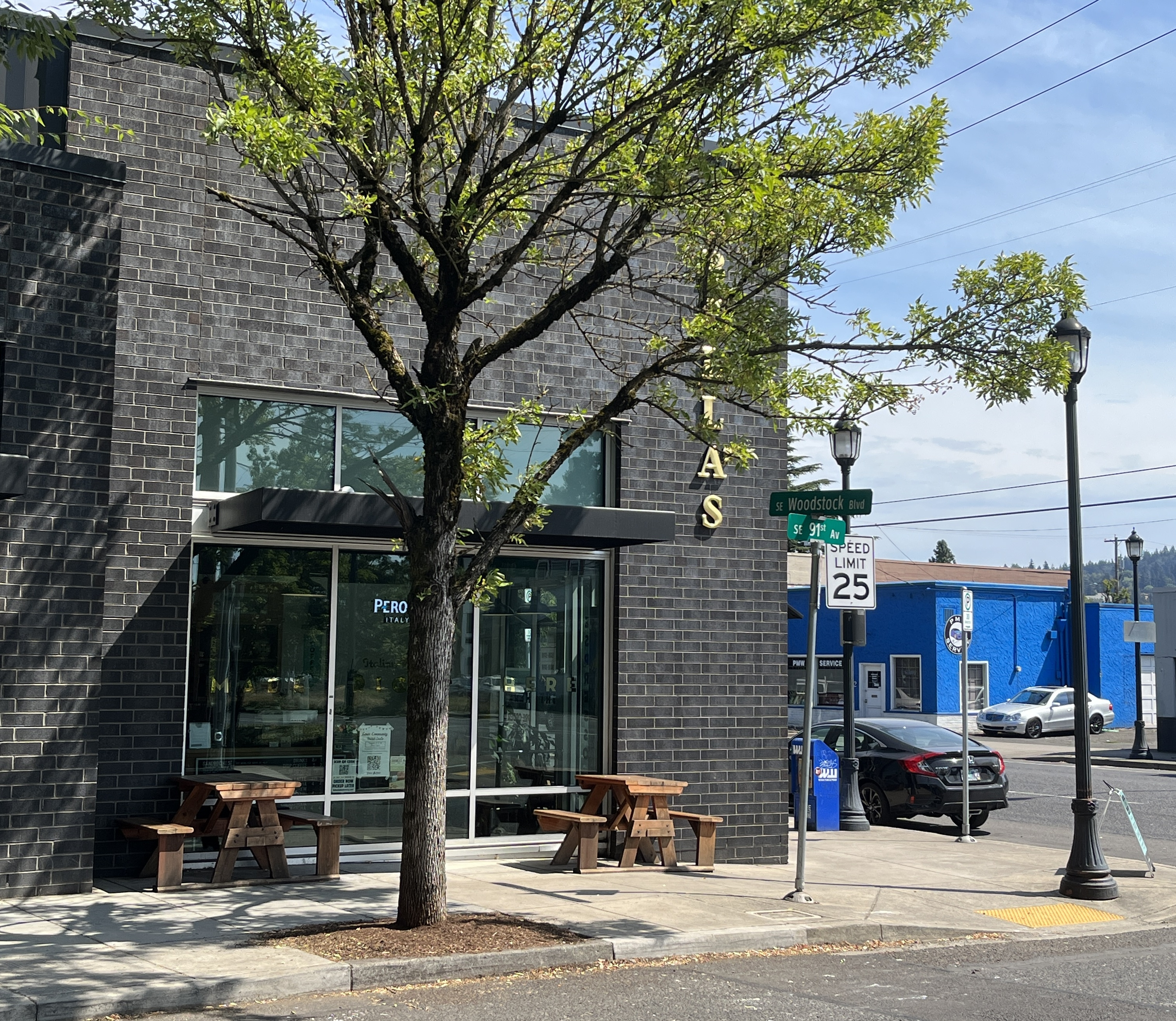
- The bakery's exterior, 2022
- Interactive map of Bella's Italian Bakery

Restaurant information
- Established: November 2018
- Owner: Michelle Vernier
- Pastry chef: Italian-American
- Location: 9119 Southeast Woodstock Boulevard, Portland, Oregon, 97266, United States
- Coordinates: 45.4793°N 122.5695°W
- Website: bellasitalianbakery.com

Bella's Italian Bakery is a bakery in Portland, Oregon, United States. It was established in 2018.

== Description ==
Bella's Italian Bakery is a 24-seat bakery at the intersection of Woodstock Boulevard and 92nd Avenue in southeast Portland's Lents neighborhood. The menu has included cannoli, ciambella crumb cake, sfincione bread, sfogliatelle clamshells with a semolina ricotta filling, pepperoni rolls, jam tarts, and tiramisu. Pizzas, sandwiches, coffee drinks, and wine are also available. The business also sells groceries such as pickled peppers, olives, cherries, cheese, pancetta, and sausage.

== History ==
Owner Michelle Vernier opened the bakery in November 2018. Bella's hosted pizza night weekly in 2021.

== Reception ==
David Landsel included Bella's in Food & Wine's 2020 list of the 100 best bakeries in the U.S. Karen Brooks and Katherine Chew Hamilton included Bella's in Portland Monthly's 2022 "opinionated guide" to the city's best bakeries.

Brooke Jackson-Glidden included the bakery in Eater Portland's 2021 overviews of "The Ideal Portland Spots to Load Up on Picnic Supplies" and "15 Portland Restaurants Where You Can Also Buy Your Groceries". The website's Nathan Williams included Bella's in a 2022 overview of recommended eateries in Lents. Michelle Lopez and Jackson-Glidden included the business in Eater Portland's 2022 list of "outstanding" bakeries in the Portland metropolitan area. Lopez and Janey Wong included the business in Eater Portland's 2025 overview of the city's best bakeries.

== See also ==
- List of bakeries
- List of Italian restaurants
