= Ti regalerò una rosa =

Single by Simone Cristicchi

from the album Dall'altra parte del cancello
- Released: February 2007
- Genre: Pop rap
- Length: 3:51
- Label: Sony BMG / Ariola
- Songwriter: Simone Cristicchi

Simone Cristicchi singles chronology
"Ombrelloni" (2006)	"Ti regalerò una rosa" (2007)	"L'Italia di Piero" (2007)

Audio
- "Ti regalerò una rosa" on YouTube

"Ti regalerò una rosa" (transl. "I will gift you a rose") is a 2007 song written and performed by Simone Cristicchi. It won the 57th edition of the Sanremo Music Festival.

== Background ==
The song was conceived by Cristicchi after visiting a number of mental asylums, for a research that formed the basis of the concept album Dall'altra parte del cancello ("On the other side of the gate"), as well as of a stage play, a documentary and a book. The lyrics were inspired by a number of letters from patients, stored in the archives of the Volterra asylum.

The song tells about the last moments of life of the mentally ill Antonio, who tells of his love for Margherita (a reference to the female protagonist of the Mikhail Bulgakov's novel The Master and Margarita) before committing suicide by jumping from a window.

During the festival, Cristicchi also performed the song in a jazz version in a duet with Sergio Cammariere. The song won both the main competition and the critics' award. It was a commercial success, ranking first on the hit parade and being certified triple platinum.

== Track listing ==
No.	Title	Length
1.	"Ti regalerò una rosa"	3:51
2.	"Che bella gente"	3:11

== Charts ==
Chart	Peak position
Italy (FIMI)	1
