= Il mio amico =

Il mio amico may refer to:

- Il mio amico (Madame song)
- Il mio amico (Anna Tatangelo song)
