= Sei parte di me =

Single by Zero Assoluto

from the album Appena prima di partire
- Released: 30 June 2006
- Recorded: 2006
- Genre: Pop
- Length: 3:00
- Label: Baraonda Srl

Zero Assoluto singles chronology
"Svegliarsi la mattina" (2006)	"Sei parte di me" (2006)	"Appena prima di partire" (2007)

"Sei parte di me" (transl. You are part of me) is a song by pop duo Zero Assoluto. It was released on 30 June 2006 as the third single from their second studio album Appena prima di partire.

"Sei parte di me" is one of Zero Assoluto's most successful singles. It peaked at number one on the singles chart and was certified Gold in Italy, becoming the second most selling song of the year, after "Svegliarsi la mattina", their previous single.

The group performed the song at the 2006 edition of Festivalbar, and won the award for "Revelation of the Year".

== Music video ==
The music video for "Sei parte di me" was shot in San Quirico d'Orcia, in the province of Siena, and it was directed by Cosimo Alemà.

== Charts ==
Weekly chart performance for "Sei parte di me"
Chart (2006)	Peak position
Italy (FIMI)	1

== Certifications ==
Region	Certification	Certified units/sales
Italy (FIMI)	Gold	10,000^{*}
^{*} Sales figures based on certification alone.
