= Mai dire mai =

Studio album by Anna Tatangelo
- Released: 2 November 2007
- Genre: Pop
- Length: 42:05
- Language: Italian
- Label: GGD

Anna Tatangelo chronology
Ragazza di periferia (2005)	Mai dire mai (2007)	Nel mondo delle donne (2008)

Singles from Mai dire mai
- 1. "Averti qui" Released: 28 September 2007; 2. "Lo so che finirà" Released: 23 November 2007; 3. "Il mio amico" Released: 29 February 2008; 4. "Sono fatta così" Released: 2 March 2008; 5. "Mai dire mai" Released: 30 May 2008

Mai dire mai is the third album by Italian singer Anna Tatangelo, released on 2 November 2007. In this album, Tatangelo debuts as co-writer in "Averti qui" and "Lo so che finirà".

In February 2008, a reissue titled Mai dire mai: Sanremo Edition was released, including the Sanremo Festival-entry "Il mio amico".

== Track listing ==
1. "Averti qui" (A. Tatangelo, G. D'Alessio) 3:51
2. "Sono fatta così" (M. Greco) 3:37
3. "Lo so che finirà" (A. Tatangelo, G. D'Alessio) 3:42
4. "La più bella" (A. Pennino, G. D'Alessio) 3:55
5. "Cosa ne sai" (S. Grandi, G. Curreri, N. Fragile) 4:12
6. "Sorvolando" (M. Fasano, A. Annona, V. Annona) 3:30
7. "Sono quello che vuoi tu" (A. Mancuso) 4:37
8. "Sei come me" (M. Greco) 3:05
9. "Un'ora che ti ho perso" (G. D'Alessio) 4:09
10. "Qui" (R. Di Pietro) 3:21
11. "Mai dire mai" (M. Greco) 4:00

Re-release track listing

Mai dire mai: Sanremo Edition track listing
No.	Title	Writer(s)	Length
1.	"Il mio amico"	Gigi D'Alessio	3:36
13.	"Il mio amico" (with Michael Bolton)	D'Alessio; L. Brancucci	3:37

== Charts ==
Chart performance for Mai dire mai
Chart (2007)	Peak position
Italian Albums (FIMI)	6
