= Progetto B =

Studio album by Anna Tatangelo
- Released: 16 February 2011
- Genre: Pop
- Length: 47:55
- Language: Italian
- Label: GGD

Anna Tatangelo chronology
Nel mondo delle donne (2008)	Progetto B (2011)	Libera (2015)

Singles from Progetto B
- 1. "Bastardo" Released: 16 February 2011; 2. "L'aria che respiro" Released: 1 April 2011; 3. "Sensi" Released: 24 June 2011; 4. "Anna" Released: 2011

Progetto B is the fifth album by Italian singer Anna Tatangelo, released on 16 February 2011.

== Tracklist ==
1. Bastardo
2. Amo la vita
3. L’aria che respiro (featuring Mario Biondi)
4. L’arcobaleno
5. Ha mille ali l'amore
6. Non mi pento
7. Non mettiamoci veleno
8. Sensi
9. Anna
10. Se
11. Odioso
12. Lo scrigno di cristallo
13. Mamma

== Charts ==
Chart performance for Progetto B
Chart (2011)	Peak position
Italian Albums (FIMI)	9
Swiss Albums (Schweizer Hitparade)	65
