= Scendi =

Studio album by Zero Assoluto
- Released: 10 July 2004
- Genre: Pop
- Label: Amaron; Universo
- Producer: Danilo Pao; Enrico Sognato

Zero Assoluto chronology
Scendi (2004)	Appena prima di partire (2007)

Singles from Scendi
- 1. "Magari meno" Released: 2002; 2. "Tu come stai" Released: 2002; 3. "Mezz'ora" Released: 2003; 4. "Minimalismi" Released: 2004

Scendi (transl. Come down) is the debut studio album by Italian pop duo Zero Assoluto. It was released on 10 July 2004 by Amaron Records.

== Track listing ==
1. "Magari meno" – 3:45
2. "40 metri quadri" – 4:37
3. "Minimalismi" – 3:30
4. "È strano" – 3:09
5. "Tu come stai" – 3:30
6. "Mezz'ora" – 3:52
7. "Scendi" – 4:10
8. "Delirio" – 3:14
9. "Quattro cose" – 3:02
10. "Settimana di ricordi" – 2:42

== Charts ==
Chart performance for Scendi
Chart (2004)	Peak position
Italian Albums (FIMI)	17
