= Okumuki =

Studio album by L'Aura
- Released: April 22, 2005
- Genre: Pop
- Length: 45:55
- Label: Epic
- Producer: l'Aura

L'Aura chronology
Okumuki (2005)	Demian (2007)

Okumuki is the debut album by Italian singer L'Aura, issued in 2005. The album was Produced, Arranged, Engineered and Mixed by Enrique Gonzalez Müller.

== Track listing ==
1. Demons (In your dreams) (Laura Abela/Dan Fries)
2. Una favola (Laura Abela)
3. Radio star (Laura Abela/Dan Fries)
4. Piove (Laura Abela)
5. Breathing (Laura Abela)
6. Domani (Laura Abela)
7. Lettere d'amore (Laura Abela/Dan Fries)
8. Alice (Laura Abela)
9. Mr. Oh! (Laura Abela)
10. Today (Laura Abela)
11. If everybody had a gun (Laura Abela)

=== Okumuki (re-release) (2006) ===
After the participation at the Sanremo Music Festival, L'Aura re-released Okumuki with three new songs, Irraggiungibile, sung at Sanremo, Dar Lin, Degli Alberi and a cover of Life On Mars by David Bowie.

1. Irraggiungibile
2. Today
3. Radio star
4. Una favola
5. Demons (In your dreams)
6. Piove
7. Dar Lin
8. Breathing
9. Degli alberi
10. If everybody had a gun
11. Alice
12. Domani
13. Lettere d'amore
14. Mr. Oh!
15. Life on Mars

== Chart ==
Chart (2006)	Peak position
Italian Albums (FIMI)	23
