= Vorrei avere il becco =

Single by Povia

from the album I bambini fanno "ooh..." la storia continua...
- Released: 28 February 2006
- Length: 2:59
- Label: Target
- Songwriter: Povia
- Producer: Francesco Musacco

Povia singles chronology
"Non è il momento" (2005)	"Vorrei avere il becco" (2006)	"Ma tu sei scemo" (2006)

Music video
- "Vorrei avere il becco" on YouTube

"Vorrei avere il becco" (transl. I wish I had a beak) is a 2006 song written and performed by Italian singer-songwriter Povia, and produced by Francesco Musacco. It won the 56th edition of the Sanremo Music Festival.

The song was released on 28 February 2006 and included in the compilation album I bambini fanno "ooh..." la storia continua....

== Charts ==
=== Weekly charts ===
Weekly chart performance for "Vorrei avere il becco"
Chart (2006)	Peak position
Italy (FIMI)	7

=== Year-end charts ===
Year-end chart performance for "Vorrei avere il becco"
Chart (2006)	Position
Italy (FIMI)	29
