= Per dimenticare =

Single by Zero Assoluto

from the album Sotto una pioggia di parole
- Released: 1 May 2009
- Length: 3:30
- Label: RTI

Zero Assoluto singles chronology
"Meglio così" (2007)	"Per dimenticare" (2009)	"Cos'è normale" (2009)

"Per dimenticare" (transl. In order to forget) is a song by pop duo Zero Assoluto. It was released on 1 May 2009 as the lead single from their third studio album Sotto una pioggia di parole.

The song peaked at number 6 on the FIMI singles chart and was certified triple platinum in Italy. It featured in the soundtrack of the 2010 teen comedy Sorry If I Want to Marry You and in Gary Winick's romantic comedy Letters to Juliet.

== Music video ==
The music video for "Per dimenticare" was directed by Cosimo Alemà, and aired on MTV Italia starting on 15 May 2009.

== Charts ==
Weekly chart performance for "Per dimenticare"
Chart (2006)	Peak position
Italy (FIMI)	6
Italy Airplay (EarOne)	9

== Certifications ==
Region	Certification	Certified units/sales
Italy (FIMI)	3× Platinum	300,000^{‡}
^{‡} Sales+streaming figures based on certification alone.
