= Appena prima di partire =

Studio album by Zero Assoluto
- Released: 2 March 2007
- Recorded: 2005–2006
- Genre: Pop
- Length: 39:05
- Label: Universo

Zero Assoluto chronology
Scendi (2004)	Appena prima di partire (2007)	Sotto una pioggia di parole (2009)

Singles from Appena prima di partire
- 1. "Svegliarsi la mattina" Released: 28 February 2006; 2. "Sei parte di me" Released: 30 June 2006; 3. "Appena prima di partire" Released: 27 February 2007; 4. "Meglio così" Released: 25 June 2007; 5. "Quello che mi davi tu" Released: 29 January 2008

Appena prima di partire (transl. Just before departing) is the second studio album by Italian pop duo Zero Assoluto. It was released on 2 March 2007.

The album includes two Sanremo Festival-entries, "Svegliarsi la mattina" (2006) and "Appena prima di partire" (2007), as well as the number one-hit "Sei parte di me".

== Track listing ==
1. "Ora che ci sei" – 3:52
2. "Appena prima di partire" – 3:21
3. "Meglio così" – 3:21
4. "Sei parte di me" – 3:00
5. "Quello che mi davi tu" – 3:03
6. "Svegliarsi la mattina" – 3:44
7. "Certe cose non cambiano" – 3:10
8. "Non voltarti mai" – 3:59
9. "Scappare" – 3:30
10. "Seduto qua" – 3:57
11. "Semplicemente" – 6:08

== Charts ==
Chart performance for Appena prima di partire
Chart (2007)	Peak position
Italian Albums (FIMI)	4

== Certifications ==
Certifications for Appena prima di partire
Region	Certification	Certified units/sales
Italy (FIMI)	Gold	35,000^{*}
^{*} Sales figures based on certification alone.
