= Demian (album) =

Studio album by L'Aura
- Released: 8 June 2007
- Recorded: 2006–2007
- Genre: Pop
- Length: 42:57
- Label: Sony

L'Aura chronology
Okumuki (2006)	Demian (2007)	L'Aura (2008)

Demian is the second album by Italian singer L'Aura, released on 8 June 2007 by Sony. The songs on the album are sung in Italian, English and French.

== Track listing ==
1. Le vent (Laura Abela)
2. One (Laura Abela)
3. È per te feat. Max Zanotti (Laura Abela/Max Zanotti/Adriano Pennino)
4. Beware! The Modern Eye! (Laura Abela)
5. I'm So Fucked Up I Can Barely Walk (Laura Abela)
6. The River (Laura Abela)
7. I Just Want to Grow Old (Laura Abela)
8. Non è una favola (Laura Abela)
9. I'm With You (Laura Abela/Adriano Pennino)
10. Demian (Laura Abela)
11. Hey Hey (Laura Abela)
12. The Doors (Laura Abela)
13. Turn Around feat. Georganne Kalweit (Laura Abela/Adriano Pennino)

== Chart ==
Chart (2007)	Peak position
Italian Albums (FIMI)	31

== Personnel ==
- L'Aura – Lead vocals, piano, keys
- Enrique Gonzalez Müller – Producer, Engineer, Mixer, Sampling
- Davide Pezzin – Electric and upright Bass
- Davide De Vito – drums, percussion
- Alberto De Rossi – Acoustic and electric guitar
- Davide Arneodo – keyboards, additional percussion
- Floriano Bocchino – piano
- Stefano Cabrera – cello
- Roberto Izzo – violin
- Raffaele Rebaudengo – viola
- L'Aura Portrais: Kris Knight
- Cover Photos: Stefano Padovani
- Art Direction and Graphic Design: Mogollon
- Management: Andrea Bariselli
