= Zero Assoluto =

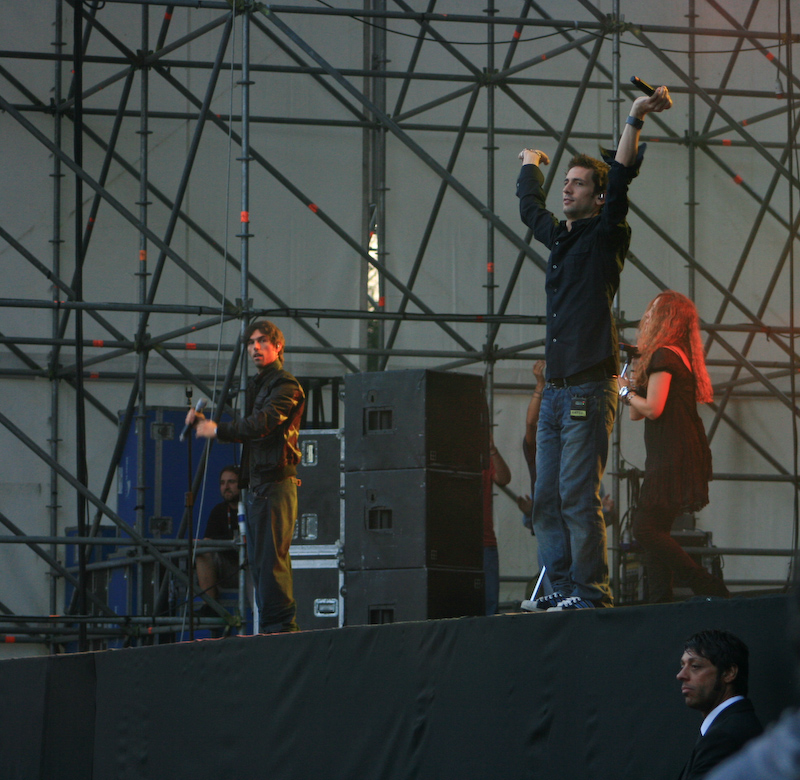

Background information
- Origin: Rome, Italy
- Genres: Pop rock
- Years active: 1999–present
- Members: Thomas De Gasperi; Matteo Maffucci
- Website: https://www.zeroassoluto.net/

Zero Assoluto is an Italian pop rock duo formed by Thomas De Gasperi and Matteo Maffucci.

== History ==
Thomas De Gasperi (born 24 June 1977) and Matteo Maffucci (born 28 May 1978) met as teenagers at the "Giulio Cesare" classical lyceum in Rome and became best friends.

Their debut single, "Ultimo capodanno" was released in 1999. This was followed in 2004 by the album Scendi, which included tracks such as "Mezz'ora" and "Minimalismi".

In the summer of 2005, they entered the Italian Top 40 chart with the song "Semplicemente", which reached number two. The success of this song enabled them to participate in the 56th Sanremo Music Festival, where they performed "Svegliarsi la mattina". The single eventually reached the top spot on the Italian Top 40 chart. Further success came with the song "Sei parte di me", which also peaked at number one.

In 2006, Zero Assoluto was featured on a version of Nelly Furtado's song "All Good Things (Come to an End)", released on the Italian version of her album Loose.

The duo returned to the Sanremo Festival in 2007, finishing ninth with the song "Appena prima di partire". Nelly Furtado appeared as a guest star during the event. Their second album, Appena prima di partire, was released during the festival and was certified platinum on April 15. On 7 May, the international version of "Appena prima di partire", featuring Nelly Furtado, was released in all Italian radio stations.

During the summer of 2007, Zero Assoluto embarked on their "Zero Assoluto Live" tour, performing in over forty concerts across Italy. Starting October 15, 2007, they hosted Vale tutto, the first quiz show on MTV Italia.

Three songs from Appena prima di partire, including "Quello che mi davi tu", have been put in the soundtrack of Scusa ma ti chiamo amore by Federico Moccia. The movie also featured a scene shot during their 2007 live tour.

In May 2009, Zero Assoluto performed their song "Per dimenticare" as part of their new album Sotto una pioggia di parole, released in June 2009. Some of the album's songs featured in Moccia's film Sorry If I Want to Marry You in 2010.

On 31 May 2011, the duo released their fourth album, Perdermi, which showcases a blend of pop and rap.

They competed at the Sanremo Music Festival 2016 with the song "Di me e di te".

== Discography ==
=== Studio albums ===
- Scendi (2004)
- Appena prima di partire (2007)
- Sotto una pioggia di parole (2009)
- Perdermi (2011)
- Alla fine del giorno (2014)
- Di me e di te (2016)

== See also ==
- Absolute zero (the English translation of "Zero assoluto")
