= Ciambella romagnola =

Traditional cake from Romagna, Italy

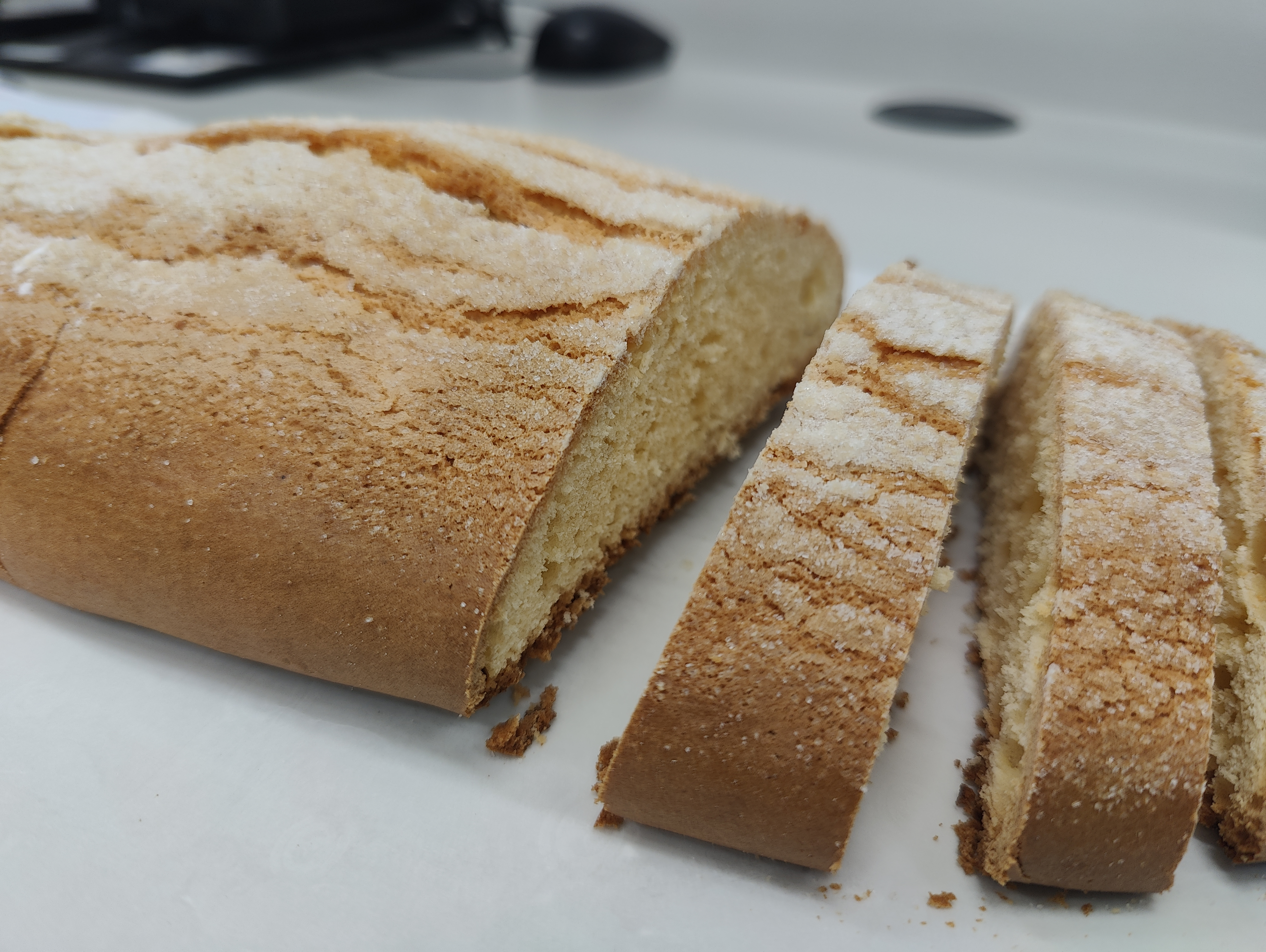
- Type: Cake
- Course: Dessert
- Place of origin: Italy
- Region or state: Romagna
- Main ingredients: Flour, sugar, lard, milk, eggs

Ciambella romagnola is a cake from the historical Italian region of Romagna. It is shaped like a loaf and does not have a hole in the middle, although its name might recall a ring-shaped cake (ciambella). Its name seems to be originated from the Latin cymbula, meaning 'boat', which resembles its shape.

== Characteristics ==
The common ingredients used for its preparation are flour, eggs, milk, sugar, lard, yeast, and lemon zest, vanilla or aniseed liqueur. Some versions might replace lard with butter and use local wine or even add ricotta cheese. After being shaped into a loaf, the dough is covered with granulated sugar or pearl sugar and it is then baked for thirty minutes at 170 °C (338 °F). After baking, some characteristic cracks form on the surface due to the leavening process.

Ciambella romagnola can be dipped in milk or tea to be eaten for breakfast or even in wine, when eaten outside of meals. On holidays, it can be used to replace sponge cake for the preparation of zuppa inglese, another Italian dessert.

== See also ==
- List of Italian desserts and pastries
