= Perdermi =

Studio album by Zero Assoluto
- Released: 31 May 2011
- Recorded: 2010–11
- Genre: Pop, synthpop
- Length: 31:01
- Label: EMI
- Producer: Danilo Pao & Enrico Sognato

Zero Assoluto chronology
Sotto una pioggia di parole (2009)	Perdermi (2011)	Alla fine del giorno (2014)

Singles from Perdermi
- 1. "Questa estate strana" Released: 22 April 2009; 2. "Perdermi" Released: 15 July 2011; 3. "Se vuoi uccidimi" Released: 23 October 2011

Perdermi (transl. Lose myself) is the fourth studio album by Italian pop duo Zero Assoluto. The album was released on 31 May 2011.

The release of the album was preceded by the single "Questa estate strana" on 22 April 2009.

== Track listing ==
1. "Perdermi" – 3:05
2. "Questa estate strana" – 2:17
3. "Se vuoi uccidimi" – 3:17
4. "L'unica" – 2:38
5. "Vieni più vicino" – 4:33
6. "Ma domani" – 3:37
7. "Un po' di sole" – 2:54
8. "Dovrei" – 2:49
9. "Tutte le cose" – 2:37
10. "Un giorno normale" – 2:52
11. "Questa estate strana" (acoustic version) – 2:22

== Charts ==
Chart performance for Perdermi
Chart (2011)	Peak position
Italian Albums (FIMI)	12
