= L'Aura =

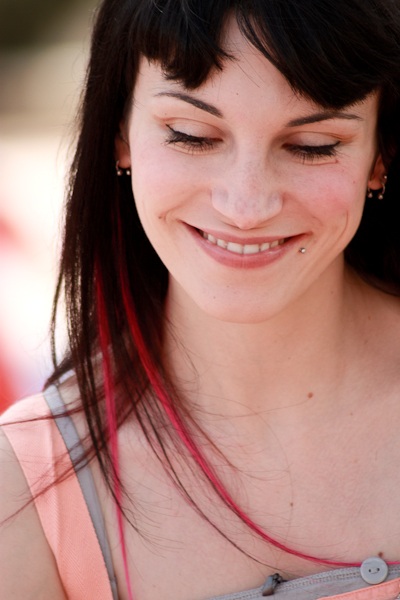
- L'Aura in 2008

Background information
- Also known as: L'Aura
- Born: Laura Abela; 13 August 1984 (age 42); Brescia, Italy
- Genres: Pop, rock, indie pop
- Occupation: Musician
- Instruments: Vocals, piano, violin
- Years active: 2000–present
- Website: www.l-aura.com

Laura Abela (born 13 August 1984), known by the pseudonym L'Aura, is an Italian singer, songwriter, composer, pianist and violinist.

== Career ==
=== Early years ===
L'Aura spent two years in San Francisco in preparation for recording her first record titled Okumuki, which was recorded in Italy and released in 2005. She sang part of it in Italian and part of it in English. The producer was Enrique Gonzalez Muller, who had worked with Nine Inch Nails, Kronos Quartet, Jason Newsted, Dave Matthews Band, and Joe Satriani.

=== Success ===
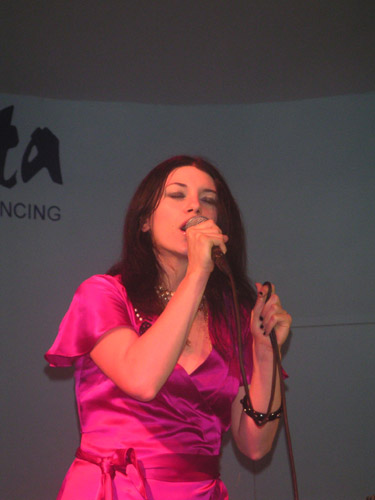
L'Aura at a concert in Brescia in April 2006

In 2006 L'Aura participated at the Sanremo Music Festival for the first time with the song "Irragiungibile", a song which was quite successful in the Italian music charts and Okumuki was certified Gold in Italy.

9 June 2007 saw the release date of her second album, Demian (like the famous book by Hermann Hesse). The first single "Non è una favola", released 18 May was followed by a second single, "È per te", which was a duet with Max Zanotti, the lead singer of Deasonika. At the end of 2007, she showed an interest in representing San Marino in the next edition of Eurovision Song Contest 2008.

L'Aura took part in the Sanremo Music Festival 2008 in Categoria Campioni with the song "Basta!" ("Enough!"), which was a radio and TV success, quickly becoming one of the most downloaded singles from the festival. In February she released her first greatest hits album: L'Aura.

Also in 2008, L'Aura performed at the 1st May's Concert in Rome and the Heineken Jammin' Festival. In July 2008, she opened for Ben Harper and R.E.M. in Verona and Milan and Alanis Morissette in Turin. The second single from the L'Aura album, "Cos'è", was released on 16 May 2008.

On 26 October 2010, L'Aura released the EP Sei come me. On this release, she used the name L'Aura Abela. On this album, she worked with the producer Dado Parisini on all of the tracks, including an Italian language version of the Bonnie Tyler song "Total Eclipse of the Heart", named "Eclissi del cuore" (Eclipse of the Heart). In October 2011, "Eclissi del cuore" was re-released as a duet with Nek, another Italian singer. The single "Come spieghi" was also released in order to promote the album.

In 2011, L'Aura (again signing as "L'Aura" solely) re-released the Sei come me EP with "Gira l'estate", "Hello Goodbye" (The Beatles cover), the "Eclissi del cuore" duet with Nek and two brand new songs.

On 26 November 2012, L'Aura announced via her Facebook page that she is pregnant with her first child, with her husband Simone Bertolotti. On 25 April 2013, L'Aura gave birth to her son, Leonardo Bertolotti.

Abela's single, "I'm an Alcoholic" was released on 19 May 2017, after almost six years without releasing any new content. It is the lead single from her yet to be released album Il contrario dell'amore.

=== Recent years ===
In January 2014, L'Aura confirmed she was working on an album.

On 8 May 2014, L'Aura was invited by her fellow Italian friend Laura Pausini to sing by her side during a show. They performed the song Con la musica alla radio.

On 2 November 2015, L'Aura confirmed on her social media that she had written the song "Lo sapevi prima tu", which would be released days after that post in Laura Pausini's album Simili. The song also has been released in Spanish, this version being titled "Lo sabías antes tú".

== Discography ==
=== Albums ===
Year	Album	ITA chart	Sales
2005	Okumuki	-	10,000
2006	Okumuki (re-release)	23	50,000
2007	Demian	31	10,000
2008	L'Aura	38	20,000
2010	Sei come me EP	50	10,000
2011	Sei come me - Deluxe Edition	52	-
2017	Il contrario dell'amore	35	-

=== Singles ===
Year	Title	Chart positions		Album
Year	Title	ITA	EUR	Album
2005	"Radio Star"	34	-	Okumuki
2005	"Today"	21	82	Okumuki
2005	"Una Favola"	33	-	Okumuki
2006	"Irraggiungibile"	17	81	Okumuki
2006	"Domani"	-	-	Okumuki
2007	"Non è una Favola"	21	-	Demian
2007	"E' per te"	-	-	Demian
2008	"Basta!"	17	178	L'Aura
2008	"Cos'è"	-	-	L'Aura
2008	"Nell'aria"	-	-	L'Aura
2010	"Come spieghi"	-	-	Sei come me EP
2011	"Eclissi del cuore"	10	-	Sei come me EP
2011	"Eclissi del cuore" (L'Aura feat. Nek)	5	-	Sei come me - Deluxe Edition
2017	"La meccanica del cuore"	-	-	-
