= Sotto una pioggia di parole =

Studio album by Zero Assoluto
- Released: 22 May 2009
- Recorded: 2008–09
- Genre: Pop
- Label: RTI

Zero Assoluto chronology
Appena prima di partire (2007)	Sotto una pioggia di parole (2009)	Perdermi (2011)

Singles from Sotto una pioggia di parole
- 1. "Per dimenticare" Released: 1 May 2009; 2. "Cos'è normale" Released: 18 September 2009; 3. "Grazie" Released: 28 May 2010

Sotto una pioggia di parole (transl. Under a rain of words) is the third studio album by Italian Pop duo Zero Assoluto. The album was released on 22 May 2009, in Italy. It was certified gold by the Federation of the Italian Music Industry, for domestic sales exceeding 30,000 units.

== Track listing ==
1. "Sotto una pioggia di parole" – 3:21
2. "Grazie" – 2:52
3. "Volano i pensieri" – 3:40
4. "Per dimenticare" – 3:34
5. "Ripensandoci" – 3:21
6. "L'infinito è dietro di lei" – 3:00
7. "Roma (che non sorridi quasi mai)" – 4:06
8. "Cos'è normale" – 3:22
9. "Non guardarmi così"
10. "Come la fortuna"

== Charts ==
Chart performance for Sotto una pioggia di parole
Chart (2009)	Peak position
Italian Albums (FIMI)	10

== Certifications ==
Certifications for Sotto una pioggia di parole
Region	Certification	Certified units/sales
Italy (FIMI)	Gold	35,000^{*}
^{*} Sales figures based on certification alone.
