= Il mio amico (Anna Tatangelo song) =

- Standard edition cover

Single by Anna Tatangelo

from the album Mai dire mai
- Released: 29 February 2008
- Genre: Pop
- Length: 3:37
- Label: Sony
- Songwriter(s): Gigi D'Alessio

Anna Tatangelo singles chronology
"Lo so che finirà" (2007)	"Il mio amico" (2008)	"Mai dire mai" (2008)

Music video
- "Il mio amico" on YouTube

"Il mio amico" (lit. 'The friend of mine') is a song by Italian singer Anna Tatangelo. It was released on 29 February 2008 by Sony Music.

The song competed at the Sanremo Music Festival 2008 and ranked second at the end of the competition.

== Track listing ==
CD
No.	Title	Writer(s)	Length
1.	"Il mio amico"	Gigi D'Alessio	3:37

CD
No.	Title	Writer(s)	Length
1.	"Il mio amico" (featuring Michael Bolton)	Gigi D'Alessio	3:38

== Charts ==
Chart (2008)	Peak position
Italy (FIMI)	14
