= Povia =

Italian singer and songwriter (born 1972)

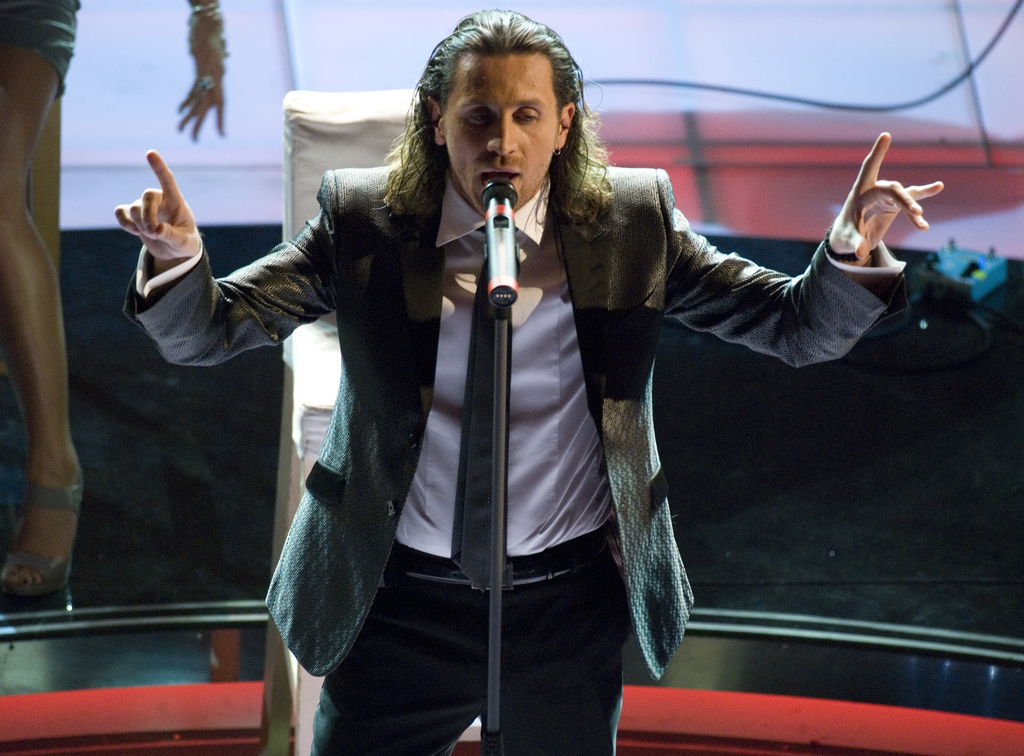
- Born: Giuseppe Povia; November 19, 1972 (age 53); Milan, Italy
- Occupation: Singer
- Height: 1.72 m (5 ft 8 in)

Giuseppe Povia (Italian pronunciation: [dʒuˈzɛppe poˈviːa]; born November 19, 1972), better known just as Povia (pronounced [ˈpɔːvja]), is an Italian pop singer-songwriter.

== Biography ==
Born in Milan, he began teaching himself guitar. He taught himself how to play music by ear; by the time he was 20, he began to compose music. In 1999, he enrolled in the Academy of Sanremo where he met Giancarlo Bigazzi.

In his songs, Povia frequently takes on social issues. In 2003, he addressed bulimia with his song Mia sorella. In 2005, his single "Avamposto 55" talked about the children of Darfur. In 2005, he produced the single "I bambini fanno: ooh..." from which the proceeds were used in a campaign he started to build hospitals in Darfur. The single spent 20 non-consecutive (19 of which were consecutive) weeks at the top of the Italian Singles Chart, selling 150,000 copies and becoming Italy's biggest-selling single of 2005. The single also received special accolades from Sony BMG.

He won the Sanremo Music Festival 2006 with the song "Vorrei avere il becco". In 2009, he ranked second place in the 59th Sanremo Music Festival with his song "Luca era gay". Despite the media initially thinking that the song was about Luca Tolve, a man who had allegedly reversed his homosexuality following the therapies of Joseph Nicolosi, Povia declared that the song was about a man called Massimiliano whom he met on a train from Milan to Rome. During the train ride the man told Povia his personal story about "having been gay", but now being married with children.

== Personal life and views ==
He has been married since 2007 to Teresa, with whom he has two daughters, Emma (2005) and Amelia (2007). He has lived in Florence for many years.

Always considering himself to be close to right-wing positions, from around 2013 Povia began to publicly express Eurosceptic and sovereigntist ideas. He has repeatedly declared himself a sympathizer of Silvio Berlusconi, Matteo Salvini, Riscossa Italia, and The People of the Family, while he has often criticized the Democratic Party.

=== Statements against immigration ===
In May 2013, Povia criticized Cécile Kyenge on Facebook stating that "if you take the problems of non-EU citizens to heart by giving them priority in a country like Italy, then it annoys me too. Italy must be managed by Italians. [...] If this continues, Italy will go to the Chinese." In July 2017, Povia praised the launch of a Molotov cocktail against a hotel property of the Italian entrepreneur Valerio Ponchiardi guilty of hosting 35 refugees. Povia called this action a patriotic act.

Povia also supported the existence of a "Kalergi plan" for the substitution of the European peoples through also false quotations to Kalergi himself.

=== Misinformation allegations ===
==== Chemtrails ====
Povia declared that chemtrails exist and reported their danger.

==== Earthquakes ====
Povia proposed, on several occasions, a pseudoscientific theory to explain why earthquakes occur. The theory in question asserts that the large number of people on earth (7 billion) can produce earthquakes with their movement. But it has been repeatedly demonstrated, scientifically, that even if each person on the planet were clustered together, this would not lead to any earthquake, given that the total weight has a mass that is too dilated and distributed to cause an earthquake.

==== Vaccines ====
Povia has repeatedly expressed opposition to the vaccines and, in addition to believing in the correlation between vaccines and autism (mistakenly described by him as "brain damage"), justifies its use only by virtue of social emergencies as (according to him) mass immigration or poor food.

Povia himself has supported the free vax movement (which many associate with a gimmick to avoid being accused of antivaccinism).

== Discography ==
=== Studio albums ===
- Evviva i pazzi... che hanno capito cos'è l'amore (2005)
- I bambini fanno "ooh..." la storia continua... (2006)
- La storia continua... la tavola rotonda (2007)
- Uniti with Francesco Baccini (2008)
- Centravanti di mestiere (2009)
- Non basta un sorriso (2009)
- Scacco matto (2010)
- Il mondo è di tutti (2011)
- I "bambini" fanno rock (2012)
- Nuovo contrordine mondiale (2016)

=== Singles ===
- "I bambini fanno "ooh..."" (2005)
- "Vorrei avere il becco" (2006)
- "Luca era gay" (2009)
- "La verità" (2010)

== Awards ==
2003 Premio Musicultura per la canzone Mia sorella
2005 Premio Mei "etichette indipendenti"
2005 Premio Lunezia nuove stelle 2005
2006 Primo premio al Festival della Canzone Italiana
2008 Leone d'argento alla carriera per la musica
2009 Premio Sala Stampa RadioTv al Festival della Canzone Italiana
2009 Premio Mogol per il testo della canzone Luca era gay
2011 Music Awards – Premio Confindustria Cultura Italia FIMI, AFI e PMI
2011 Targa nella Strada del Festival di Sanremo in Via Matteotti a Sanremo, per il brano Vorrei avere il becco
