= Marta Cecchetto =

Italian model

Marta Cecchetto (born 18 June 1978) is an Italian model.

== Biography ==
Cecchetto was born in Foligno where she spent her childhood. She played the piano for seven years, and was also interested in sports, horse riding and tennis above all, and dance.

At 14 she started her modeling career after taking part in the Italian edition of "The look of the year", where she met a talent scout who gave her the opportunity to work in fashion, despite the fact that she did not win the contest.

She later moved to the United States and modeled for brands such as Ungaro, Roberto Cavalli, Valentino, MaxMara, Trussardi, Donna Karan, La Perla, Parah, Just Cavalli and Chiara Boni.

She also appeared on the cover of several, including Vogue, Gala, Max, Maxim, Donna Moderna, Anna and Marie Claire.

She appeared in advertisements for H-Q Swiss Made, La coppa del nonno and Mercedes.

In 2006 she was chosen, alongside Vanessa Hessler, Claudia Cedro and Francesca Lancini, to be one of the soubrettes of Festival di Sanremo.

From 2007, when her boyfriend Luca Toni moved to Munich, Germany, she has worked in many German advertisements for companies such as Nivea.

In 2008 she started co-hosting, with other models and stylists, a TV program named Modeland on All Music for boys and girls who want to become models.

On 20 June 2013 she gave birth to her first baby girl, Bianca.
