= Semplicemente (Zero Assoluto song) =

Single by Zero Assoluto

from the album Appena prima di partire
- Released: 2005
- Recorded: 2005
- Genre: Pop
- Length: 3:35
- Label: Baraonda

Zero Assoluto singles chronology
"Minimalismi" (2004)	"Semplicemente" (2005)	"Svegliarsi la mattina" (2006)

"Semplicemente" (transl. Simply) is a 2005 pop song by Italian pop duo Zero Assoluto. A longer version of the song was added to the group's second studio album, Appena prima di partire, in 2007.

The single became a commercial and broadcast success, peaking at number 2 on the FIMI chart. The song reached the platinum certification during the 2005 summer, and was later certified gold in 2007 under the new FIMI certification system.

== Music video ==
The music video for the song was shot in Rome and directed by the Cosimo Alemà.

== Charts ==
Weekly chart performance for "Semplicemente"
Chart (2005)	Peak position
Italy (FIMI)	2

== Certifications ==
Region	Certification	Certified units/sales
Italy (FIMI)	Gold	10,000^{*}
^{*} Sales figures based on certification alone.
