= Svegliarsi la mattina =

Single by Zero Assoluto

from the album Appena prima di partire
- Released: 28 February 2006
- Recorded: 2005
- Genre: Pop
- Length: 3:37
- Label: Baraonda
- Songwriter(s): Thomas De Gasperi; Matteo Maffucci; Danilo Pao; Enrico Ciarallo

Zero Assoluto singles chronology
| "Semplicemente" (2005) | "Svegliarsi la mattina" (2006) | "Sei parte di me" (2006) |

"Svegliarsi la mattina" (transl. Waking up in the morning) is a song by Italian pop duo Zero Assoluto, released on 28 February 2006 as the second single from their second album Appena prima di partire.

The song was Zero Assoluto's entry for the Sanremo Music Festival 2006, where it placed seventh in the grand final.

It peaked at number 1 on the Italian singles chart, becoming the most selling single of the year.

== Track listing ==
1. Svegliarsi la mattina
2. Semplicemente
3. Svegliarsi la mattina (music video)
4. Semplicemente (music video)

== Charts ==
Weekly chart performance for "Svegliarsi la mattina"
| Chart (2006) | Peak position |
|---|---|
| Italy (FIMI) | 1 |

== Certifications ==
| Region | Certification | Certified units/sales |
|---|---|---|
| Italy (FIMI) | Platinum | 50,000^{‡} |
^{‡} Sales+streaming figures based on certification alone.
