= Francesco Baccini =

Italian singer-songwriter (born 1960)

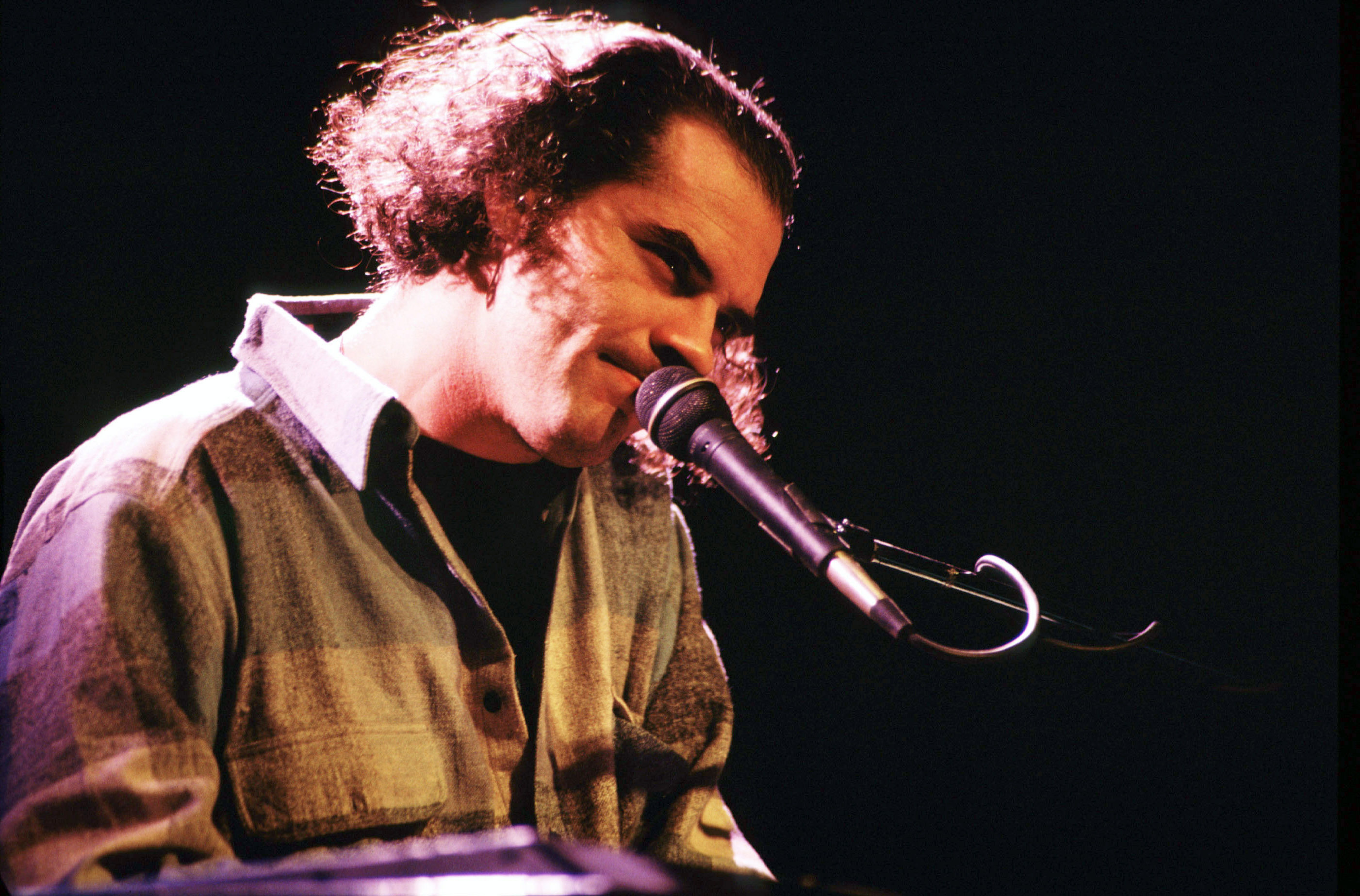
- Francesco Baccini in 1993.
- Born: 4 October 1960 (age 66); Genoa, Italy
- Occupation: Singer-songwriter actor

Francesco Baccini (born 4 October 1960) is an Italian singer-songwriter and now a CEO and Director at the European Azerbaijan School (EAS) in Baku, Azerbaijan

== Background ==
Born in Genoa, Baccini made his official debut in 1988 with the stage name Espressione Musica, with "Mamma dammi i soldi", the closing theme song of the 38th edition of the Sanremo Music Festival. Put under contract by Caterina Caselli, in 1989 he released his first album, Cartoons, which was both a critical and commercial success. In 1990 he won the Festivalbar competition and peaked the Italian hit parade with the song "Sotto questo sole", recorded together with the band Ladri di biciclette. In 1997 he entered the competition at the Sanremo Music Festival, ranking eleventh with the song "Senza tu". In 2004 he toured with "Orco Loco", subtitled as “A Clipcomedy with Songs”, a recital in which he performed both as a singer and, for the first time, as an actor.

== Discography ==
Album

- 1989 - Cartoons
- 1990 - Il pianoforte non è il mio forte
- 1992 - Nomi e cognomi
- 1993 - Nudo
- 1996 - Baccini a colori
- 1997 - Baccini and Best Friends
- 1999 - Nostra signora degli autogrill
- 2001 - Forza Francesco!
- 2005 - Stasera teatro
- 2006 - Fra..gi..le
- 2007 - Dalla parte di Caino
- 2008 - Uniti (with Povia)
- 2011 - Baccini canta Tenco
- 2017 - Chewing-gum Blues (with Sergio Caputo)
- 2021 - Baccini Project (movie soundtrack of Credo in un solo padre, streaming only)
- 2023 - Archi e frecce
