= Sergio Cammariere =

Italian jazz singer-songwriter

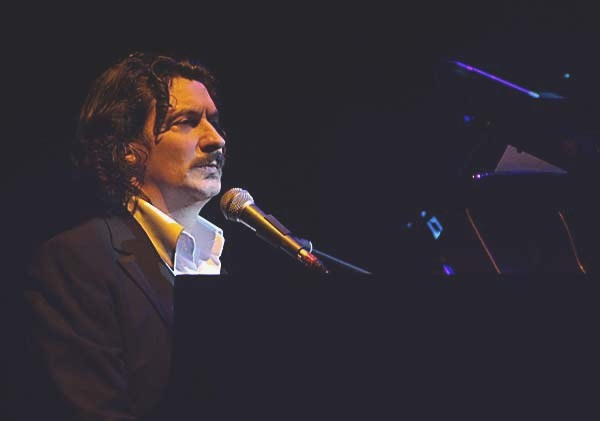
- Cammariere in concert in 2008

Background information
- Born: 15 November 1960 (age 65)
- Origin: Crotone, Calabria, Italy
- Genres: jazz; pop
- Instrument: Piano
- Website: www.sergiocammariere.com

Sergio Cammariere (born 15 November 1960 in Crotone, Italy) is an Italian jazz singer-songwriter. He has released 12 studio albums and 1 live album.

== Career ==
After a long career as a niche musician distinguished by his collaboration with the poet and singer-songwriter Roberto Kunstler, in 2003 he appeared at the Sanremo Festival performing the song Tutto quello che un uomo. He came in third place in this contest and won the Mia Martini Critics Award.

His music video "Sorella Mia" won a prize at the Fandango "Videoclipped The Radio Stars" festival. His music can be classified as jazz and Cammariere performs on the piano and sings.

In 2021 he wrote his autobiography "Libero nell’aria".

Cammariere is a distant cousin of Italian singer-songwriter Rino Gaetano.

== Discography ==
=== Singles ===
- 1998 – Tempo perduto
- 2003 – Tutto quello che un uomo

=== Albums ===
- 1993 – Kunstler-Cammariere & Stress Band I ricordi e le persone
- 2002 – Dalla pace del mare lontano
- 2003 – Dalla pace del mare lontano (Second version, including the track Tutto quello che un uomo – Sanremo 2003)
- 2004 – Sul sentiero
- 2006 – Il pane, il vino e la visione
- 2009 – Carovane
- 2012 – Sergio Cammariere
- 2014 – Mano nella mano
- 2016 – Io
- 2017 – Piano
- 2019 – La fine di tutti i guai
- 2021 – Piano nudo
- 2021 – In Concerto al Teatro Sistina (live album)
- 2023 – Una sola giornata

=== Soundtracks ===
- 1992 – Quando eravamo repressi
- 1994 – Teste Rasate
- 1996 – USD – Uomini senza donne
- 2007 – L'Abbuffata
- 2010 – Comiche vagabonde (Tre comiche di Charlie Chaplin)
- 2010 – Ritratto di mio padre
- 2011 – Tiberio Mitri – il campione e la miss
- 2013 – Maldamore
- 2018 – Prima che il gallo canti
- 2018 – Apri le labbra
- 2019 – Twelve minutes of rain
- 2021 – Il campione e la miss (Colonna sonora originale della fiction TV)

=== Compilations ===
- 2008 – Cantautore piccolino
- 2017 – L'artista, la vita, la storia
