= Ciambella =

Italian ring-shaped cake

Ciambella (Italian: [tʃamˈbɛlla]; pl.: ciambelle) is an Italian ring-shaped cake with regional varieties in ingredients and preparation. As an example, a basic version of the cake could be prepared using flour, baking powder, salt, eggs, milk (or cream), sugar, oil, and vanilla flavouring. Honey is sometimes added as a sweetener. To create the light texture the sugar and eggs are whisked together, and oil and milk are added while whisking continuously until the mixture is frothy. Then sifted baking powder and flour are added to the dry ingredients and the cake is baked in a ring shaped pan.

Butter may be used instead of oil, and mixed berry yogurt (yogurt ai frutti di bosco) can be added to the batter. Common flavourings include lemon, orange, chocolate or cocoa, hazelnuts, and vanilla. The finished cake may be decorated with powdered sugar, pine nuts, toasted almond pieces, apricot jelly or pistachios.

== Regional ==
Many regions have registered one or more types of ciambella in their official list of prodotti agroalimentari tradizionali (PAT), including:

- Calabria
  - cuddrurieddru, a sweet fried doughnut made with flour and boiled potatoes, typically made at Christmas.
- Campania
  - graffa, a sweet fried doughnut made with flour and potatoes, covered with caster sugar, often best when eaten just out of the frier, very soft.
- Emilia-Romagna
  - ciambella ferrarese, a baked doughnut made with flour, sugar, eggs, and butter. Originally an Easter dish.
  - ciambella romagnola, a traditional cake from the Italian region of Romagna. It is shaped like a loaf and does not have a hole in the middle, although it has the same as the ring-shaped cake (ciambella).
- Lazio
  - ciambella a cancello, with an intricate rosette shape, made using aniseed and local wine.
  - ciambella all'acqua ('water doughnut'), so-called because it is first boiled in water and then baked.
  - ciambella ellenese, a small, knot-shaped doughnut made with cinnamon and covered with rose water.
- Marche
  - ciambella frastagliata, made with mistrà (aniseed-flavour liquor) and a high proportion of egg, which is boiled, dried with a cloth, cut in half and baked until crispy.
  - ciambellone, typically shaped as a loaf of bread is a traditional sweet of the Marche region. Unlike the other types, this ciambella has a more firm consistency which allows it to be stuffed either with hazelnut cocoa spread or marmalade.

== Origin and history ==
The ciambella is a simple, but popular sweet all over Italy, although it is considered a symbol of the Marche region. It was originally consumed during buffets, family dinners, or weddings. In present times it is mostly served for breakfast with milk, or as a snack during the day.

== See also ==
- List of Italian desserts and pastries
