= Gigi D'Alessio =

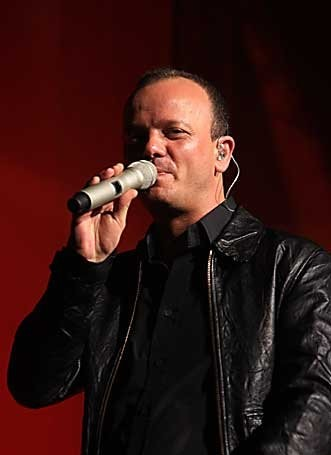

Background information
- Born: Luigi D'Alessio; 24 February 1967 (age 59); Naples, Campania, Italy
- Genres: Pop; Neapolitan
- Occupations: Singer; songwriter; record producer
- Instruments: Vocals; piano
- Years active: 1992–present
- Spouse: Carmela Barbato (m. 1986; div. 2014)
- Partners: Anna Tatangelo (2005–2017, 2018–2020); Denise Esposito (2020–present)
- Children: 6, including Luca
- Website: www.gigidalessio.com

Luigi "Gigi" D'Alessio (born 24 February 1967) is an Italian popular singer-songwriter from Naples. In his career, he has sold over 30 million records.

== Career ==
D'Alessio was born in Naples. He was well known in Naples in the early 1990s and throughout Italy due to participation in the Sanremo Festival in 2000 and 2001. He has also made overseas appearances, the most recent was in Malta on 7 July 2012. He lives in Rome with the popular Italian singer Anna Tatangelo, who is two decades younger than him. Previously, he was married to Carmela Barbato, with whom he has three children, Claudio, Ilaria and Luca. He frequently writes and produces songs for Tatangelo, and some of the hits he had a hand in writing include "Quando due si lasciano" and "Ragazza di periferia". For Tatangelo's latest album, the couple penned the songs "Averti qui" and "Lo so che finirà" together. The couple have recorded two duets: "Un nuovo bacio" and "Il mondo è mio". They also toured the US and Canada together in October, featuring in successful concerts. He was the writer and composer of Tatangelo's song performed at Sanremo Music Festival 2008, "Il mio amico".

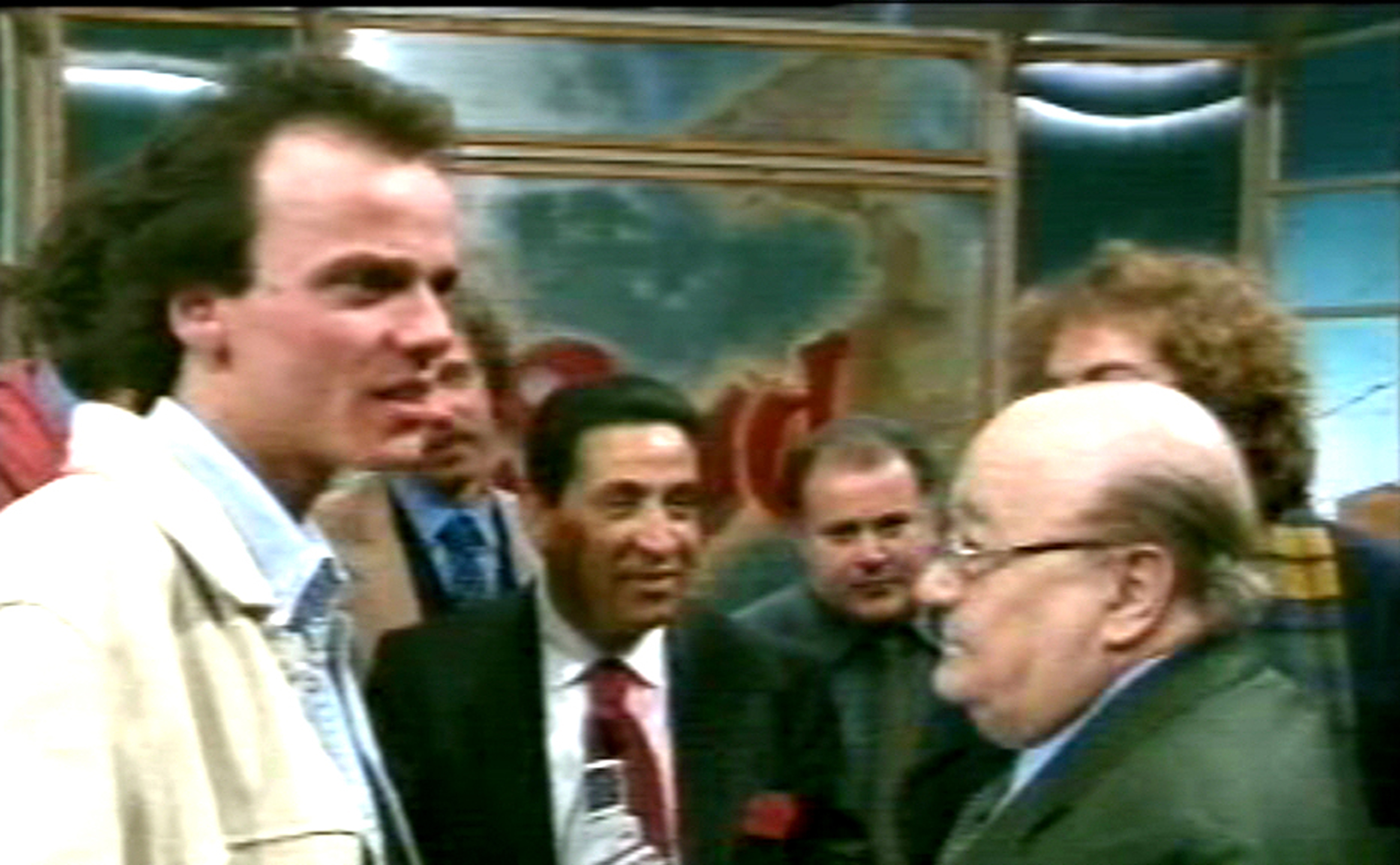
Gigi D'Alessio, Mario Trevi, Aurelio Fierro (1998)

D'Alessio achieved international success with his single "Un cuore malato", a duet with Belgian-Sicilian singer Lara Fabian. He also released in 2007 a version of this song half in Italian, half in Portuguese, named "Um coração apaixonado", recorded with Brazilian pop singer Wanessa Camargo. The song was included in both D'Alessio's Made in Italy Brazilian edition (replacing "Un cuore malato" with Lara Fabian) and in Camargo's 2007 Total album.

In a late 2008 interview with Italian Vanity Fair, D'Alessio says that at the beginning of his career from 1992 to 1997 as his fame grew around Napoli, members of various Camorra clans would threaten him to sing at their parties and other festive gatherings. He would hear things like, "If you don't come and sing at my son's wedding reception, I'll cut your throat" and "If you don't sing your songs at my nephew's baptismal lunch, I'll bust your head." Some Camorra members preferred to make threats aimed at D'Alessio's nose, legs, tongue, and hands. At one point D'Alessio sang at 15 parties a day from lunch until dawn. After D'Alessio's 7 June 1997 concert at Napoli's San Paolo Stadium, he stopped singing at parties.

On 4 March 2010 he debuted as a run of a television program on Rai Uno presenting his first one-man show called "Gigi this is me". The first episode had an audience of 5.899 million viewers and a share of 25.04%. The sequel was released on 8 June to "6 come sei" simply titled "semplicemente sei" early in the radio single from Vita, dedicated to his son Claudio. It also contains the song "adesso basta" for the campaign against bullying promoted by the city of Rome, of which D'Alessio is testimonial. "Free" is the second single. The 10 December public with Anna Tatangelo and Valeria Marini album 3 x te, the proceeds from sales will be donated to charity. Consisting of 6 tracks, the album once again features 2 songs from D'Alessio, two of two songs sung by Tatangelo and Valeria Marini.

On 14 February 2011 he performed at Radio City Music Hall in New York, the show being aired on Rai Uno on 4 and 11 March. The concert also received the prize "United States – Italy Friendship Award" by the National Italian American Foundation.

In 2012 he participated in the Festival of Sanremo with the song Breathe sung in tandem with Loredana Bertè. On 15 February 2012 he released the new album Chiaro.

== Personal life ==
Gigi D'Alessio was married from 1986 until 2006, to Carmela Barbato, with whom he had three children: Claudio (1986), Ilaria (1992) and Luca (2003).

In December 2006, his relationship with singer Anna Tatangelo, was publicly announced. The two have a son, Andrea, born on 31 March 2010. After a year-long break-up, in September 2018, the couple got back together, but on 3 March 2020, through his Instagram profile, the singer announced the end of their relationship.

The following year, his engagement to lawyer Denise Esposito, twenty-six years his junior, was announced. In August 2021, it was announced that the couple were expecting a child. They have two children.

== Discography ==
=== Albums ===
- Lasciatemi cantare (1992)
- Scivolando verso l'alto (1993)
- Dove mi porta il cuore (1994)
- Passo dopo passo (1995)
- Fuori dalla mischia (1996)
- È stato un piacere (1997)
- Portami con te (1999)
- Quando la mia vita cambierà (2000)
- Il cammino dell'età (2001)
- Uno come te (2002)
- Quanti amori (2004) ( ITA # 1 – 4× platinum – 300,000+ )
- Made in Italy (2006) ( 5× Platinum – 340,000+ ) ( Diamond – 500,000+ )
- Superamore (2008) (unpublished)
- Questo sono io (2008) ( 5× Platinum – 340,000+ )
- Chiaro (2012)
- Ora (2013)
- Malaterra (2015)
- 24 febbraio 1967 (2017) (ITA No. 3)
- Noi due (2019)
- Buongiorno (2020)
- Fra (2024)
- NUJE (2025)

=== EP ===
- Sei come sei (2009) ( Platinum – 95,000+ )
- Semplicemente sei (2010) ( Platinum – 95,000+ )

=== Compilations ===
- Buona vita (2003)
- Mi faccio in quattro (2007) ( 2× Platinum – 180,000+ )

=== Live ===
- Tutto in un concerto (1998)
- Cuorincoro (2005)
- Tu vuo' fa' l'americano – Live in New York (2011)
- Ora dal Vivo Live (2014)

=== Other albums ===
- El camino de la edad (2001)
- Buona vita (Spanish Version) (2003)
- Primera Fila (2013)

== Films ==
- Annaré (1998)
- Cient'anne (1999)
- Addio fottuti musi verdi (2017)
