= Fabri Fibra =

Italian rapper (born 1976)

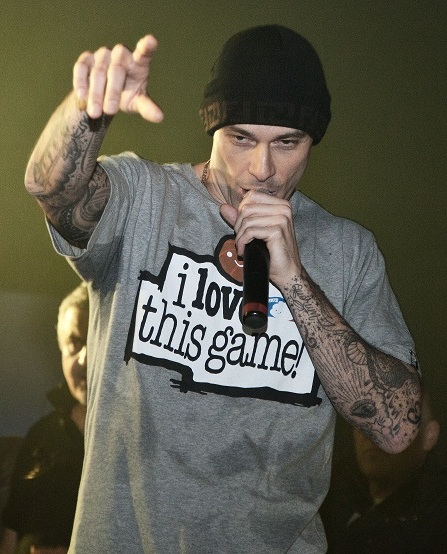
- Fabri Fibra in 2011 during a showcase in Rimini, Italy

Background information
- Born: Fabrizio Tarducci; 17 October 1976 (age 50); Senigallia, Italy
- Genres: Hip hop; hardcore hip hop; political hip hop
- Occupation: Rapper
- Instruments: Kazoo
- Years active: 1996–present
- Labels: Teste Mobili Records (1999–2004); Vibrarecords (2002–2005); Tempi Duri Records (2011–2015); Universal Music (2006–2019); Sony (2020–)
- Website: http://www.fabrifibra.it

Fabrizio Tarducci (born 17 October 1976), known professionally as Fabri Fibra, is an Italian rapper. In his career he has sold more than 2.3 million certified copies.

== Biography ==
Tarducci was born in Senigallia, Italy. He became interested in music from a young age; he wrote and performed his first piece when he was 17 years old.

In 1995 he recorded his first demo. He created the tandem Uomini di Mare with DJ Lato, beatmaker and deejay, and in 1996 they produced the underground CD Dei del mare quest'el gruv. In 1999 Fabri and Lato produced and distributed the LP Sindrome di fine millennio, with collaborations from El Presidente (also known as Esa), Inoki, Joe Cassano and his brother Nesli.

Following his underground success, Fabri Fibra began performing around Italy. In 2000 he established his label and group Teste Mobili Records, and collaborated with various Italian rap groups, lending vocals as well as lyrics to the mixtape circuit. In his career he has sold more than two million certified copies.

In 2013 he campaigned for Adidas Originals, reinterpreting the song with Run-DMC and DJ A-Trak.

== Solo career ==
=== Turbe Giovanili (2002) ===
In 2002 Fabri released his first solo album, titled Turbe giovanili, for which he wrote and recorded his lyrics under the production and arrangement of Neffa. A year later Fabri distributed Lato e Fabri Fibra, which brought a close to the partnership with Lato and the Uomini di Mare project with aky il grande.

Nesli's Home and Fabri Fibra's Mr. Simpatia were released simultaneously on 1 September 2004.

=== Mr. Simpatia (2004) ===
Released in 2004, Mr. Simpatia is Fibra's second solo album. The instrumental bases were made by his younger brother, the rapper Nesli Rice, except for "Io non ti invidio" (made by Bassi Maestro) and the album's bonus track (by Bosca).

The album cover shows Fibra's head lying on its side with a gruesome injury. Mr. Simpatia is an ironic title; the main themes are the Italian hip hop scene, contempt for society, relationships with girls, and Fibra's frustration about his job.

=== Tradimento (2006) ===
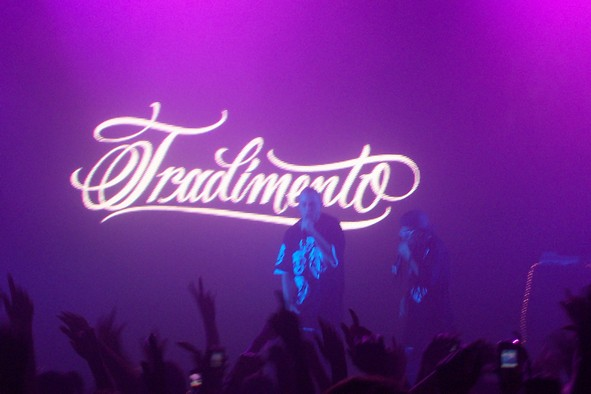
Fabri Fibra in concert in Florence, Italy, in 2006, during the Tradimento tour

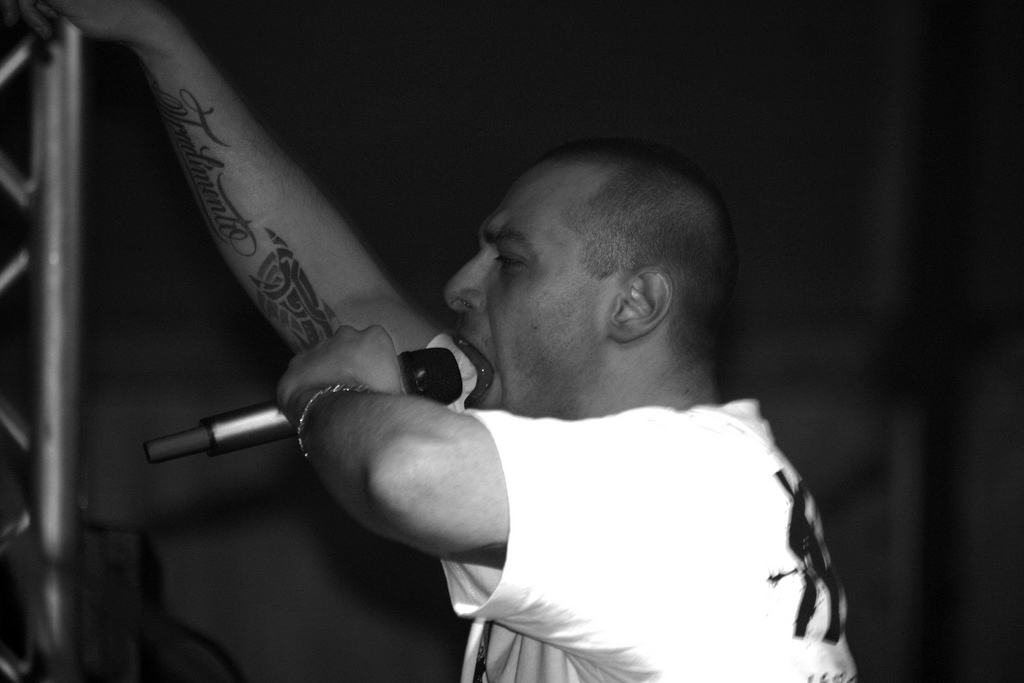
Fabri Fibra in concert in Udine, Italy, in 2006

After splitting from his recording company contract at Vibrarecords, Fibra went underground and was unheard from for a year, until he resurfaced with a new deal at major recording company Universal Music. Under the production of Fish and brother Nesli, Fibra created his most commercially and artistically successful album, Tradimento. His first single, released in Europe 4 April 2006, was "Applausi per Fibra". The single discussed Fibra's personal and life experiences overcome by Fabri himself, with a certain emphasis on self-praise.

Following the success of "Applausi per Fibra", the second single, "Mal di stomaco", which gained instant infamy, most notably for the originality of its music video (a fabricated broadcast of Sky TG24—a satellite news station) that reports on the death of Fabri Fibra in a car accident. The authenticity is sealed with "live coverage" reports, interviews from famous stars such as Fernanda Lessa, Éva Henger, Jimmy Ghione, producer Fish, rapper Vacca and brother Nesli. The video ends with Fabri's body disappearing from the morgue.

The music video for the track "Idee stupide" was in black and white and uses a Rocky-style montage that complements Fabri's underdog lyrics.

In 2010, Tradimento came second in a newspaper poll, making it the second most important album of the decade in Italy.

=== Bugiardo (2008) ===
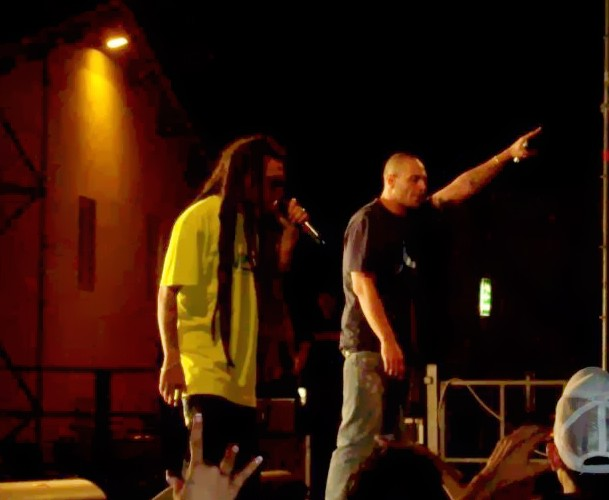
Fabri Fibra and Vacca during a live show in 2008

Fabri Fibra's next album Bugiardo, came out on 9 November 2007, after the release of the street-single "Questo è il nuovo singolo". The first official single, "Bugiardo", came out on 15 October 2007, and the second official single being "La soluzione", which came out on 9 November 2007. On 25 April 2008, Fibra released the single "In Italia" featuring singer Gianna Nannini. The song became a massive summer hit, being the most watched music video in Italy of 2008 and earning a nomination at the MTV Europe Music Awards for Best Italian Act.

=== Chi Vuole Essere Fabri Fibra? (2009) ===
On 10 April 2009, Fibra released his fifth album, entitled Chi vuole essere Fabri Fibra?. He released two songs from the album, entitled "Incomprensioni" (featuring Federico Zampaglione) and "Speak English", which discusses the cultural differences between Italy and England; the video for "Speak English" was shot in Brighton, where Fibra lived and worked for four years. A track off the album, entitled "Donna famosa", is featured in the soundtrack of the FIFA 10 football video game.

=== Controcultura (2010) ===
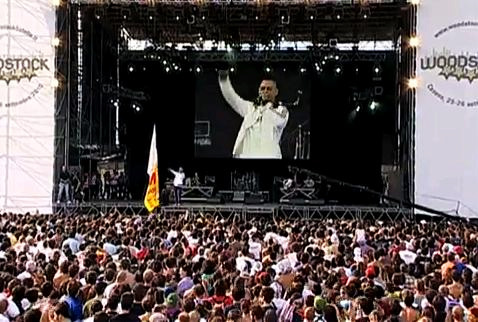
Fabri Fibra in Cesena, Italy, in 2010

From 18 February 2010, MTV Italia broadcast a program on Thursday nights entitled Fabri Fibra: Italy. The program was defined as a docu-drama, and included five episodes showing the lives of young people living in socially disadvantaged situations. On 4 May 2010, Fibra released a remastered album of Turbe giovanilili, entituled Turbe giovanili Remaster. On 20 July 2010, Fibra also released his first web-album, entitled Quorum, which is available in his website.

The album Controcultura was released on 7 September 2010 and reached #1 in the Italian albums chart. The album has so far spawned three singles named "VIP in trip", "Tranne te" (both peaking at #2 in the Italian singles chart), "Qualcuno normale" featuring the artist Marracash and "Le donne". Fibra said that "Le donne" music was a response to the bales of misogyny that he had to face for years, mainly because of Mr. Simpatia.

On 1 March 2011, Fibra released the Tranne te (Rap futuristico EP), an extended-play which had remixes of "Tranne te" with other artists, such as Redman, the French rapper Soprano and old friends from Fibra such as Marracash and Dargen D'Amico. At the same month, Fibra released an online mixtape named Venerdì 17, available to download for free on his website. It contains many freestyles and remixes of some of his earlier work, including many remixes of some of his more recent work.

The year of 2011 was also remarkable for Fibra, which he has won four consecutives awards: the platinum disc for "Controcultura", a multiplatinum disc for "Tranne te", a "Superman" award from the TRL Awards 2011 and a "Wind Music" award.

In the Summer of 2011 Fibra launched his own record label named "Tempi Duri Records". Young rappers Entics and Clementino have been signed to the label.

=== Non è gratis (2012) ===
Fabri Fibra met Clementino in the summer of 2011 at his Controcultura Tour in Naples, and immediately they began to record together. The initial idea, as stated by Clementino in an interview, was simply to make a mixtape. Subsequently, however, both changed their minds and decided to produce a whole album under the name of Rapstar. On 9 January 2012 out double single "Ci rimani male/Chimica Brother", single opening of Non è gratis, debut album of the band, released on 31 January 2012.

=== Guerra e pace (2013) ===
Fabri Fibra's seventh studio album, titled Guerra e pace, was released on 5 February 2013, preceded by the Casus belli EP, which came out for free on 30 October 2012. The album, the third one by Fibra to enter at #1 in the Italian albums chart (the others being Tradimento and Controcultura), features various productions by many American producers, such as Organized Noize, Fyre Dept., Lee Major, Dot da Genius & Woodro Skillson, Rob Holladay & Mr. Franks, Antwan "Amadeus" Thompson and J.U.S.T.I.C.E. League.

=== Squallor (2015) ===
On 21 May 2014, Fabri Fibra published the works carried out from the eighth studio album via Facebook, after leaving the diatribe with Vacca behind admitting that the interest concerns a story done was over, as there was nothing vaguely anymore artistic in the last answer of Vacca. The dispute was however continued by Vacca with the song "Patti chiari", made with Entics and present on the latter's album, Entics Television, Vol. 3.

In 2014 Fabri Fibra also starred in the film Numero zero - Alle origini del rap italiano, as well as having collaborated with rapper Nitro on the realization of the song "Doggy Style", present in Machete Mixtape III. At the beginning of 2015, he collaborated with the rapper Marracash on the song "Vita da star" contained in Status (which was then re-proposed in a new version in which in addition to the refrain the rapper from Senigallia can also have an exclusive verse, together with his own song "Playboy"), with Club Dogo at the remix of "Dieci anni fa", and updated with Nitro to the song "Ong Bak", inserted in Suicidol.

On 7 April 2015, the rapper announced a surprise through Twitter the publication of the eighth studio album, entitled Squallor. On the same date, the first single "Come Vasco" and the video clip of the song "Il rap nel mio paese" were also released. The promotion of the album continued through the publication of the video clips of the songs "Playboy", "Alieno" and "E tu ci convivi", released between July and October.

=== Tradimento 10 anni - Reloaded (2016) ===
In 2016 he collaborated with Mondo Marcio on the song "Scoppia la bomba", contained in La freschezza del Marcio, and with Jake La Furia on the single "Ali e radici", featured in Fuori da qui. On 11 May of the same year, he announced the re-release of the third album in the studio, Tradimento, on the occasion of the tenth anniversary of the latter. Called Tradimento 10 anni - Reloaded and released on 10 June, the re-release contains a second CD consisting of 14 remixes of the original songs made by various and producers, including Don Joe and Big Fish, and featuring unpublished verses as singer by various rappers, such as Gemitaiz, Emis Killa and MadMan.

=== Fenomeno – Masterchef EP (2017) ===
On 1 March 2017, Fabri Fibra released the title of the ninth studio album, Fenomeno, and the publication of the single of the same name, which took place on the 3rd of the same month. The album was released on 7 April 2017, and consists of seventeen tracks, three of which were collaborations with Thegiornalisti, Roberto Saviano and Laïoung. Particular attention to the scope for tracks 16 and 17, namely "No help" and "Thanks", where the rapper discusses the difficult relationship with the family, especially with his brother Nesli and his mother. Before the release of the album, Fabri Fibra also made available for free download a song rejected by Fenomeno, entitled "Tony Hawk".

On 5 May 2017, the second single of the album, "Pamplona", was released, accompanied by the relative video clip published on YouTube. On the 11th of the same month the rapper held an exclusive concert for RadioItaliaLive performing some historical pieces of his career and others taken from Fenomeno.

On 22 June 2017, the unpublished single "Luna" published a surprise for digital download, which saw the participation of Mahmood, while on 22 September the single "Stavo pensando a te" was released, third extracted from Fenomeno.

At the end of October, Fabri Fibra published the publication of the EP Fenomeno – Masterchef EP, composed of unpublished songs originally discarded by Fenomeno and published on 17 November. On 18 December, the rapper made available for digital download a new version of "Stavo pensando a te", created in collaboration with the singer-songwriter Tiziano Ferro.

=== Il tempo vola 2002–2020 and collaborations (2019) ===
On 11 May 2018, Italian singer-songwriter Carl Brave released the single "Fotografia", featuring guest vocals by Francesca Michielin and Fabri Fibra. Fibra also appeared on Lazza's single "Lario RMX", on the remix version of "Non confondermi" by Marracash, and on the song "Stai zitto", included in Salmo's album Playlist. In 2019, together with Mahmood and Sfera Ebbasta, he recorded the single "Calipso", credited to producers Charlie Charles and Dardust. He also contributed the mixtape Machete Mixtape 4, appearing in "Yoshi" and "Star Wars".

On 25 October 2019, the compilation album Il tempo vola 2002–2020 was released. It was preceded by the single "Come mai", recorded with Franco126 and composed by Fabri Fibra, Franco126 and Calcutta. The album was distributed in several editions, including a triple disc version with five outtakes, also released separately in the EP Outtakes, and a Single Box Edition, composed of 19 CD singles.

=== Fabri Fibra changes major new contact in Sony Music ===
On 23 January 2020, Fabri Fibra announced that he has signed a contract with Sony Music to finish with Universal Music saying "from today on I am part of the Sony Music Italy family".

In January 2022 the mixtape We the Squad Vol. 1 by the SLF group was released, featuring the song "18 ANNI" featuring Fabri Fibra.

=== Caos (2022) ===
On 18 March 2022, Fabri Fibra's new album named Caos was published. This was his first album published through Sony Music. It contains 17 tracks containing an intro and an outro. Fibra is also the artistic director, since the concept and the sonority of this album come from the rapper's background and culture. The tracklist contains important featurings such as Salmo, Guè, Marracash and Neffa, but also new names (also in the title track "Caos") as Lazza and Madame.

=== Mentre Los Angeles brucia (2025) ===
On 14 May 2025, Fabri Fibra announced on his Instagram page the release of his next studio album, scheduled for release on 20 June 2025. The album, Mentre Los Angeles brucia, has two singles, with their respective video clips. "Che gusto c'è" was released on 23 May and features Tredici Pietro, with its official video being released on 30 May. The second single is Stupidi, featuring italian rappers Papa V and Nerissima Serpe. As opposed to Caos this album doesn't have as much featurings, but still has some important ones, like italian rappers Massimo Pericolo and Noyz Narcos and singers like Joan Thiele and Gaia. The intro of the album samples Francesco Guccini's L'avvelenata. This album has various songs that are more introspective, like Figlio, Come finirà? and Mio padre which talks about his relationship with his father, in a similar way to Ringrazio on Fenomeno. The album then ends with a remake of Verso altri lidi, which first appeared on Sindrome di fine millennio (1999) by Uomini di mare. The rapper then started his Festival Tour 2025 on 3 July, with the first date being in Trentino; this tour will also see the rapper playing in important italian venues in which he never played, like Circo Massimo in Rome and Unipol Forum in Milan.

== Disputes ==
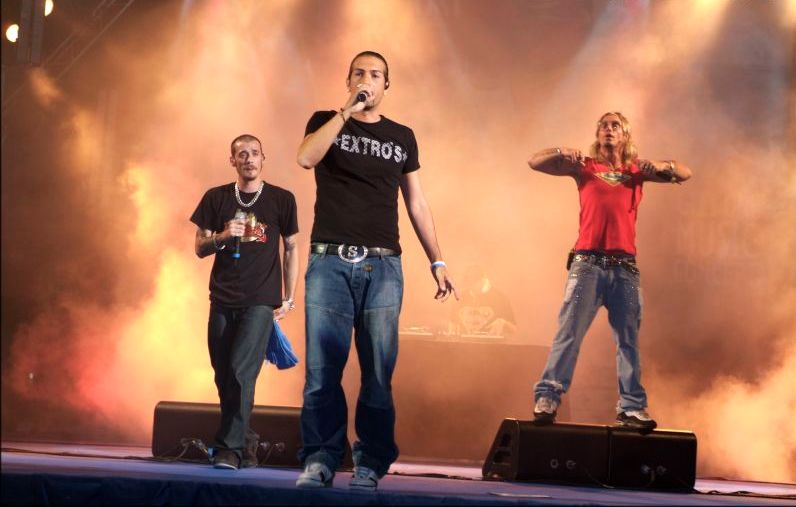
Picture of Gemelli DiVersi

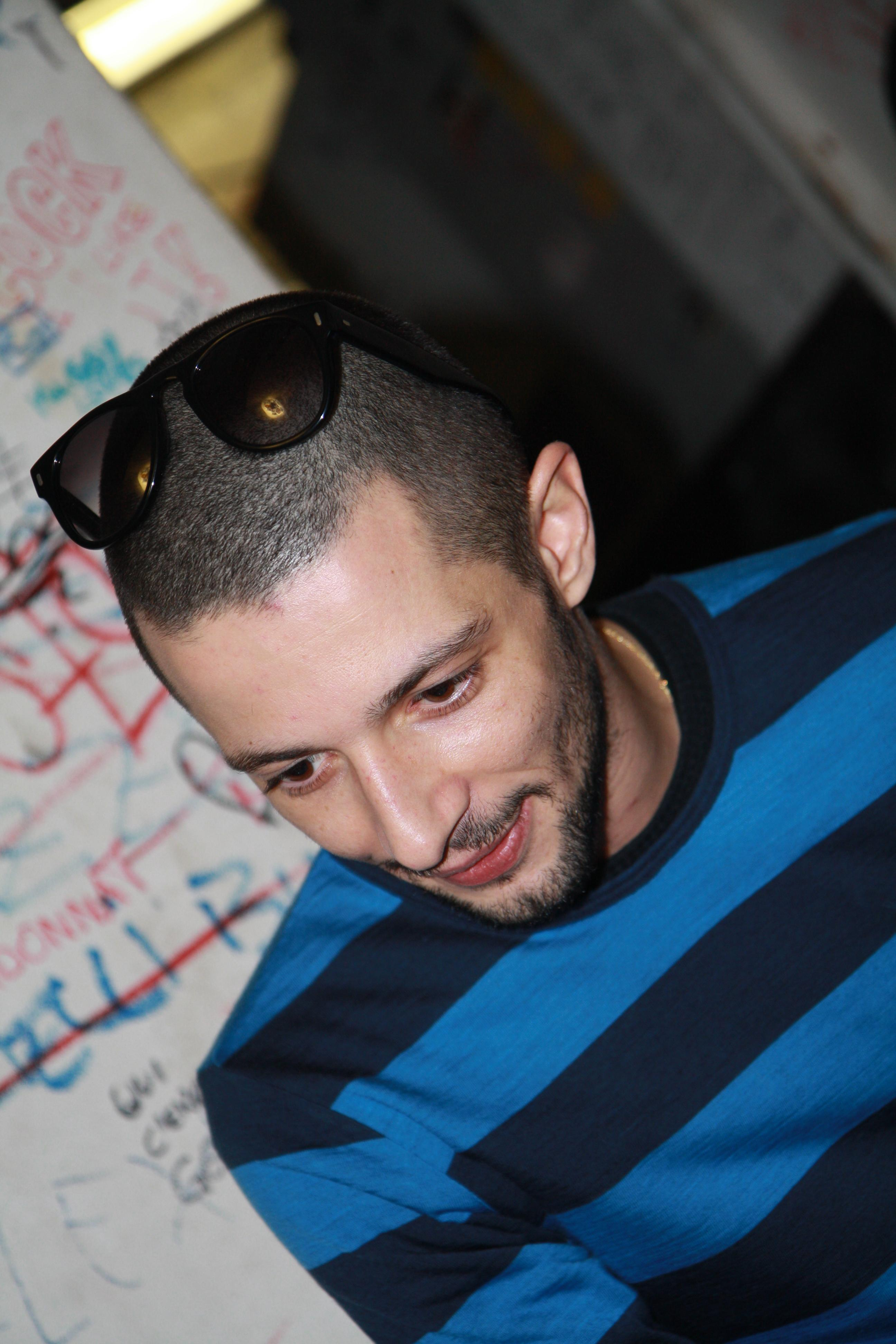
Picture of Nesli

=== Rivalry with Grido and Gemelli DiVersi ===
From 2006 to 2007, Fabri Fibra and Grido from Gemelli DiVersi have been pierced with blows of dissing. In 2006 Fabri Fibra attacks Grido and Gemelli DiVersi in the song "Idee stupide" and Grido reply with the song Standing Ovation changing the words of the famous "Applausi per Fibra". Some weeks later, in Bologna, there is the MTV Day and Fabri Fibra, with Vacca insults again Grido with another dissing changing the words of his song Oh yeah Mr. Simpatia. The latest reply arrives in 2007 with the song Bboy-Bband of Gemelli DiVersi, and so ends the controversy.

=== Rivalry with his brother ===
In October 2010, his brother Nesli released an interview to the newspaper Panorama about his relationship with Fabri Fibra.

I ended the relationship with my brother three years ago, when his life fell apart the boundary that separates the person from the character. From a certain point he didn't want to take off the mask of Fabri Fibra. I returned to the surface after being dropped by Universal Music (Fabri Fibra's label). Fabri Fibra and his entourage tells me that I was an idiot, because I wasn't enough nasty, because I didn't do the things that needed to be done.

— Interview on Panorama.it

In 2013, Nesli makes peace with his brother, dedicating to him a strophe in the song Un bacio a te.

== Discography ==
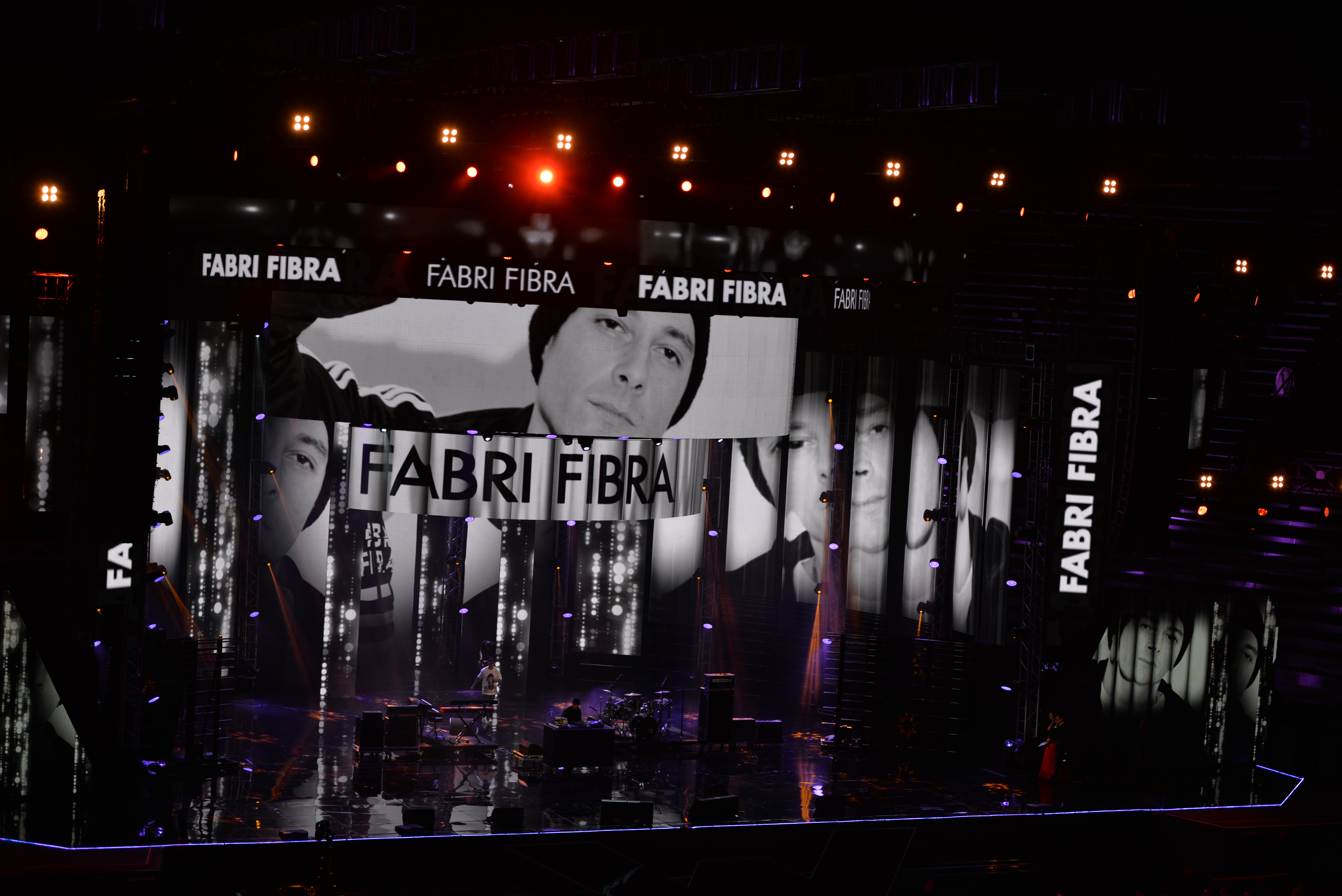
Fabri Fibra's live at Verona Arena in 2016

=== Studio albums ===
==== Solo ====
Title	Details	Peak chart positions		Certifications
Title	Details	ITA	SWI	Certifications
Turbe giovanili	Released: 1 February 2002; Label: Vibrarecords; Formats: CD, LP, digital download, streaming	6	—	FIMI: Platinum
Mr. Simpatia	Released: 1 September 2004; Label: Vibrarecords; Formats: CD, LP, DVD, digital download, streaming	3	—	FIMI: 2× Platinum
Tradimento	Released: 26 May 2006; Label: Universal; Formats: CD, LP, digital download, streaming	1	—	FIMI: Platinum
Bugiardo	Released: 9 November 2007; Label: Universal; Formats: CD, digital download, streaming	6	—	FIMI: Gold
Chi vuole essere Fabri Fibra?	Released: 10 April 2009; Label: Universal; Formats: CD, DVD, digital download, streaming	7	—	FIMI: Gold
Controcultura	Released: 7 September 2010; Label: Universal; Formats: CD, DVD, digital download, streaming	1	79	FIMI: 2× Platinum
Guerra e pace	Released: 5 February 2013; Label: Universal; Formats: CD, digital download, streaming	1	45	FIMI: Platinum
Squallor	Released: 7 April 2015; Label: Universal; Formats: CD, digital download, streaming	2	—	FIMI: Gold
Fenomeno	Released: 7 April 2017; Label: Universal; Formats: CD, LP, digital download, streaming	1	52	FIMI: 3× Platinum
Caos	Released: 18 March 2022; Label: Epic; Formats: CD, LP, digital download, streaming	1	15	FIMI: 2× Platinum
Mentre Los Angeles brucia	Released: 20 June 2025; Label: Epic; Formats: CD, LP, digital download, streaming, cassette	1	23	FIMI: Platinum
"—" denotes album that did not chart or were not released.

==== Collaborative albums ====
Title	Details	Peak chart positions	Certifications
Title	Details	ITA	Certifications
Non è gratis (with Clementino)	Released: 31 January 2012; Label: Universal, Tempi Duri; Formats: CD, digital download, streaming	7	
Zarathustra Style (with Neffa)	Released: 9 October 2026; Label: Sony	1	

=== Live albums ===
Title	Details
Squallor Live	Released: 23 October 2015; Label: Universal; Formats: digital download

=== Compilations ===
Title	Details	Peak chart positions	Certifications
Title	Details	ITA	Certifications
Il tempo vola 2002–2020	Released: 25 October 2019; Label: Universal; Formats: CD, VHS, cassette, digital download, streaming	4	FIMI: Gold

=== Mixtapes ===
Title	Details
Quorum	Released: 20 July 2010; Label: Tempi Duri; Formats: digital download
Venerdì 17	Released: 18 March 2011; Label: Tempi Duri; Formats: digital download
Rima dopo rima	Released: 25 January 2013; Label: Tempi Duri; Formats: digital download

=== Extended plays ===
Title	Details
Nient'altro che la verità	Released: 31 October 2007; Label: Universal; Formats: CD
Casus belli EP	Released: 30 October 2012; Label: Universal; Formats: digital download
Fenomeno – Masterchef EP	Released: 17 November 2017; Label: Universal; Formats: CD, LP, digital download, streaming
Outtakes	Released: 25 October 2019; Label: Island; Formats: CD, LP, digital download, streaming

=== Singles ===
==== As lead artist ====
Title	Year	Peak chart positions	Certifications	Album
Title	Year	ITA	Certifications	Album
"Applausi per Fibra"	2006	9	FIMI: Gold	Tradimento
"Mal di stomaco"	2006	36		Tradimento
"Bugiardo"	2007	25	FIMI: Gold	Bugiardo
"La soluzione"	2007	49		Bugiardo
"In Italia" (with Gianna Nannini)	2008	4	FIMI: Gold	Bugiardo²
"Incomprensioni" (featuring Federico Zampaglione)	2009	32		Chi vuole essere Fabri?
"Speak English"	2009	—		Chi vuole essere Fabri?
"Vip in trip"	2010	2	FIMI: Platinum	Controcultura
"Tranne te"	2010	2	FIMI: 3× Platinum	Controcultura
"Qualcuno normale" (featuring Marracash)	2011	—		Controcultura
"Le donne"	2011	14	FIMI: Platinum	Controcultura
"L'italiano balla" (with Crookers)	2012	28		Non-album single
"Pronti, partenza, via!"	2012	11	FIMI: Platinum	Guerra e pace
"Ring Ring"	2013	61		Guerra e pace
"Panico" (featuring Neffa)	2013	30	FIMI: Platinum	Guerra e pace
"Bisogna scrivere"	2013	—		Guerra e pace
"Niente di personale"	2014	51		Non-album single
"Come Vasco"	2015	—		Squallor
"Alza il volume" (with Prezioso)	2015	—		Non-album single
"Vita da star RMX" / "Playboy" (with Marracash)	2015	—		Squallor and Status
"La pula bussò - 2016 RMX" (with Gemitaiz)	2016	—		Tradimento (10 anni – Reloaded)
"Lo sto facendo"	2016	84		Non-album single
"Fenomeno"	2017	12	FIMI: 2× Platinum	Fenomeno
"Pamplona" (featuring Thegiornalisti)	2017	4	FIMI: 4× Platinum	Fenomeno
"Luna" (featuring Mahmood)	2017	—		Fenomeno – Masterchef EP
"Stavo pensando a te"	2017	7	FIMI: 3× Platinum	Fenomeno
"Yoshi" (with Dani Faiv and Thasup)	2019	1	FIMI: 4× Platinum	Machete Mixtape 4
"Come mai" (featuring Franco126)	2019	10	FIMI: Gold	Il tempo vola 2002–2020
"Propaganda" (featuring Colapesce Dimartino)	2022	10	FIMI: 2× Platinum	Caos
"Stelle" (featuring Maurizio Carucci)	2022	23	FIMI: Gold	Caos
"Contrabbando" (with Tropico and Cesare Cremonini)	2022	74		Non-album single
"Caos" (featuring Lazza and Madame)	2022	2	FIMI: 2× Platinum	Caos
"Parafulmini" (with Ernia and Bresh)	2023	13	FIMI: 3× Platinum	Io non ho paura
"In Italia 2024" (featuring Emma and Baby Gang)	2024	16	FIMI: Platinum	Non-album single
"Che gusto c'è" (featuring Tredici Pietro)	2025	6	FIMI: Platinum	Mentre Los Angeles brucia
"Stupidi" (featuring Papa V and Nerissima Serpe)	2025	53		Mentre Los Angeles brucia
"Milano Baby" (featuring Joan Thiele)	2025	68		Mentre Los Angeles brucia
"Vivo"	2025	82		Mentre Los Angeles brucia
"Antidroga" (with Emma)	2026	95		TBA
"—" denotes album that did not chart or were not released.

==== As featured artist ====
Title	Year	Peak chart positions	Certifications	Album
Title	Year	ITA	Certifications	Album
"Domani 21/04.09" (as a member of Artisti Uniti per l'Abruzzo)	2009	1		Charity single
"Festa festa" (Crookers featuring Fabri Fibra and Dargen D'Amico)	2010	35		Tons of Friends
"Le leggende non muoiono mai" (Don Joe and Shablo featuring Fabri Fibra, Jake La Furia, Noyz Narcos, Marracash, Guè, J-Ax and Francesco Sarcina)	2011	68		Thori & Rocce
"L'inquietudine di esistere" (Tiromancino featuring Fabri Fibra)	2011	—		L'essenziale
"Dietro front" (Emis Killa featuring Fabri Fibra)	2012	98		L'erba cattiva
"Fisico & politico" (Luca Carboni featuring Fabri Fibra)	2013	14	FIMI: Gold	Fisico & politico
"Ali e radici" (Jake La Furia featuring Fabri Fibra)	2016	—		Fuori da qui
"Barracuda" (Boomdabash featuring Jake La Furia and Fabri Fibra)	2018	63		Barracuda
"Lario RMX" (Lazza featuring Fabri Fibra)	2018	—		Non-album single
"Fotografia" (Carl Brave featuring Francesca Michielin and Fabri Fibra)	2018	6	FIMI: 3× Platinum	Notti brave
"Hotel" (Mecna featuring Fabri Fibra)	2018	—		Blue Karaoke
"Torcida" (Big Fish featuring Fabri Fibra, Jake La Furia, Emis Killa and Chadia Rodríguez)	2019	—		Non-album single
"Chi vuol essere milionario?" (Clementino featuring Fabri Fibra)	2019	—		Tarantelle
"Calipso" (Charlie Charles and Dardust featuring Mahmood, Sfera Ebbasta and Fabri Fibra)	2019	1	FIMI: 4× Platinum	Non-album single
"Mal di testa" (Elodie featuring Fabri Fibra)	2020	76		This Is Elodie
"Monolocale" (Francesca Michielin featuring Fabri Fibra)	2020	—		Feat (stato di natura)
"Bataclan" (Nerone featuring Fabri Fibra)	2020	87		Maxtape
"Il mio amico" (Madame featuring Fabri Fibra)	2021	11	FIMI: Platinum	Madame
"Sfiga" (Grido featuring Fabri Fibra)	2022	—		Non-album single
"Universo" (Deda featuring Fabri Fibra and Neffa)	2022	—		House Party
"Obladi oblada" (Charlie Charles featuring Ghali, Thasup and Fabri Fibra)	2023	43		Non-album single
"Fino al giorno nuovo" (Negramaro featuring Fabri Fibra)	2023	45		Free Love
"Mondo panico" (Ex-Otago featuring Fabri Fibra)	2023	—		Auguri
"Pallottole sull'amore" (Cor Veleno featuring Fabri Fibra)	2024	—		Fuoco sacro
"Fogliemorte" (Neffa featuring Fabri Fibra)	2024	66		Non-album single
"Peyote" (Articolo 31 featuring Fabri Fibra and Rocco Hunt)	2024	65		Protomaranza
"—" denotes album that did not chart or were not released.

=== Notable guest appearances ===
Title	Year	Other artist(s)	Album
"Una minima"	1999	Fritz da Cat, DJ Inesha	Novecinquanta
"Maxidelitto di scarsi"	2000	Mente, Nesli	Viaggi da e per…
"Il colpo di troppo"	2000	Marya, Men in Skratch	Bohemienne - La figlia del vento
"A che brindi?"	2000	Marya, Men in Skratch	Bohemienne - La figlia del vento
"La grande truffa del rap"	2000	Gente Guasta, Nesli	La grande truffa del rap
"È unta e c'è l'olio"	2002	El Presidente	Tutti gli uomini del Presidente
"Piccolezze"	2003	Nesli	Ego
"Abbi fede"	2004	Mondo Marcio	Fuori di qua
"S.A.I.C."	2004	Bassi Maestro, DJ Yaner	Seven: The Street Prequel
"Sono un prodotto"	2004	Nesli	Home
"L'appuntamento"	2004	Nesli	Home
"Il mio nome"	2004	Nesli	Home
"Chi può e chi si attacca"	2005	Kaso & Maxi B	Tangram
"Presta attenzione"	2006	Supa	No Delay
"Pain"	2006	Antianti	Il tappetto dava un tono all'ambiente
"Exlusive"	2006	DJ Nais	Very Nais vol. 3
"Fratelli bandiera"	2007	Nesli	Le verità nascoste
"Non piove"	2007	Vacca	Faccio quello che voglio
"Deadicated"	2008	Cole, Duke Montana	Ministero dell'inferno
"Al Quaeda"	2008	Noyz Narcos	The Best Out Mixtape
"Siamo nella merda"	2009	Gianna Nannini	Giannadream - Solo i sogni sono veri
"Questo Natale"	2009	J-Ax, Marracash, Alessandra Amoroso	Radio DeeJay's Merry Christmas
"Italian Psycos"	2010	Noyz Narcos	Guilty
"Hocus Pocus"	2010	DJ Myke	Hocus Pocus
"Nessuno parla più"	2010	Dargen D'Amico	D'arte prima
"Stupidi"	2010	Marracash	Fino a qui tutto bene
"It-Alieni"	2010	Supa	Dico il vero
"Diglielo"	2010	Supa	Dico il vero
"Anche tu, anche se (non trovi le parole)"	2010	Elisa	Ivy
"Canzoni da stadio"	2010	Two Fingerz	Il disco nuovo / Il disco volante
"Vinci o perdi"	2011	Don Joe, Shablo	Thori & Rocce
"Il mio mixtape"	2011	Entics	Soundboy
"Tempi duri"	2011	Maxi B	Cattivo Mixtape
"Quando sarò morto"	2011	Marracash, Jake La Furia	King del Rap
"Troppo bello"	2012	Maxi B	L'ottavo giorno della settimana
"Top Ten"	2012	Rayden, DJ Double S	L'uomo senza qualità
"Pazienza"	2012	Entics	Carpe Diem
"Alphabet Killers"	2012	Duke Montana	Stay Gold
"Una seria"	2013	Baby K	Una seria
"Questa volta"	2013	Clementino	Mea Culpa
"In orbita"	2013	Guè	Bravo ragazzo
"Bei momenti"	2013	Fritz da Cat	Leaks
"Doggy Style"	2014	Nitro	Machete Mixtape III
"Vita da star"	2015	Marracash	Status
"Dieci anni fa" (Remix)	2015	Club Dogo	Non siamo più quelli di Mi fist (The Complete Edition)
"Ong Bak"	2015	Nitro	Suicidol
"Boom"	2015	Clementino, Guè	Miracolo!
"Ramadan"	2015	MadMan	Doppelganger
"Fammi fuori"	2016	Gemitaiz	Nonostante tutto
"Scoppia la bomba"	2016	Mondo Marcio	La freschezza del Marcio
"Un uomo di plastica"	2016	Gel	Io non sono buono
"Splendida giornata"	2016	Giuliano Palma	Groovin'
"Sopravvissuto"	2016	Emis Killa	Terza stagione
"Purdi RMX"	2016	Marracash, Guè	Santeria (Voodoo Editoon)
"Non muovono il collo"	2017	Bassi Maestro	Mia maestà
"Dopo esco"	2017	Izi	Pizzicato
"Deja vù senza fiato"	2017	Claver Gold	Requiem
"Pezzo trap"	2018	Gemitaiz	Davide
"Non confondermi"	2018	Marracash	Marracash (10 anni dopo)
"Hotel"	2018	Mecna	Blue Karaoke
"Muovo le ali 2018"	2018	Tiromancino	Fino a qui
"Stai zitto"	2018	Salmo	Playlist
"Anni 90"	2019	Mahmood	Gioventù bruciata
"Box Logo"	2019	Lazza	Re Mida
"Star Wars"	2019	Massimo Pericolo	Machete Mixtape 4
"Saluti"	2019	Night Skinny, Guè, Rkomi	Mattoni
"Bad People"	2019	Night Skinny, Noyz Narcos	Mattoni
"Parano1a K1d"	2019	Thasup	23 6451
"Jeans strappati"	2019	Ketama126	Kety
"Presidenziale"	2019	Vegas Jones	La bella musica
"Avvoltoi"	2020	Nitro	GarbAge
"Aria"	2020	Dani Faiv	Scusate se esistiamo
"Non me ne frega un cazzo"	2020	Ernia	Gemelli
"Sparami"	2020	Emis Killa, Jake La Furia, Salmo	17
"Pazzo"	2020	Izi	Riot
"In una benz"	2020	Gemitaiz	QVC9
"Cronici 2021"	2021	Sottotono, Primo Brown	Originali
"Vada come vada"	2021	Rocco Hunt	Rivoluzione
"Faccio cose"	2022	Sick Luke, Izi, Jake La Furia	X2
"18 anni"	2022	SLF, Geolier	We the Squad Vol.1
"In fissa"	2022	Michele Canova	Level One
"BTX Posse"	2022	Night Skinny, Coez, Ernia, Geolier, Guè, Lazza, MamboLosco, Tony Effe, Paky	Botox
"Proibito"	2023	Drillionaire, Taxi B, Mahmood	10
"Mai più"	2024	MACE, Vins, Fulminacci	Māyā
"Non mi vedi"	2024	Baby Gang, Ernia, Rkomi, Geolier	L'angelo del male
"Walzer"	2024	Night Skinny, Papa V, Nerissima Serpe	Containers
"Sfiga pt. 2"	2024	Grido	Musica eterna
"Bop"	2025	Rose Villain	Radio Vega
"Hype"	2025	Neffa, Myss Keta	Canerandagio parte 1
"Autodafè e batteria"	2026	Frankie Hi-NRG MC	Voce e batteria
"Timeless"	2026	MadMan, Joshua	MM Vol. 5

== Awards and nominations ==
=== MTV Europe Music Awards ===
- 2008: nomination for "Best Italian act"
- 2011: nomination for "Best Italian act"
- 2017: nomination for "Best Italian act"

=== World Music Awards ===
- 2014: nomination for "Best International Album" for his album Guerra e Pace

=== MTV Italian Hip Hop Awards ===
- 2012: nomination for "Best Video" for his 2 singles "L'italiano balla" and "La luce" featuring Clementino

=== Wind Music Awards ===
- 2011: "Platinum disc" for his album Controcultura, "Digital song" for his 2 singles "Tranne te" and "VIP in trip"
- 2016: "Special Award for 10 Years" for his album Tradimento

=== FIMI Awards ===
- 2008: "Special Award to be entered for the once in FIMI charts"

=== TIM MTV Awards ===
- 2017: "MTV Rap Icon"

=== TRL Awards ===
- 2011: "Superman Award"

=== Mortal Kombat (Italian Competition of freestyle) ===
- 2001: first place

=== Special Platinum by Universal Music ===
- 2016: special Platinum disc given by Universal Music for his 2 millions of fans on Facebook
