= Cosimo Alemà =

Italian film director and music video director

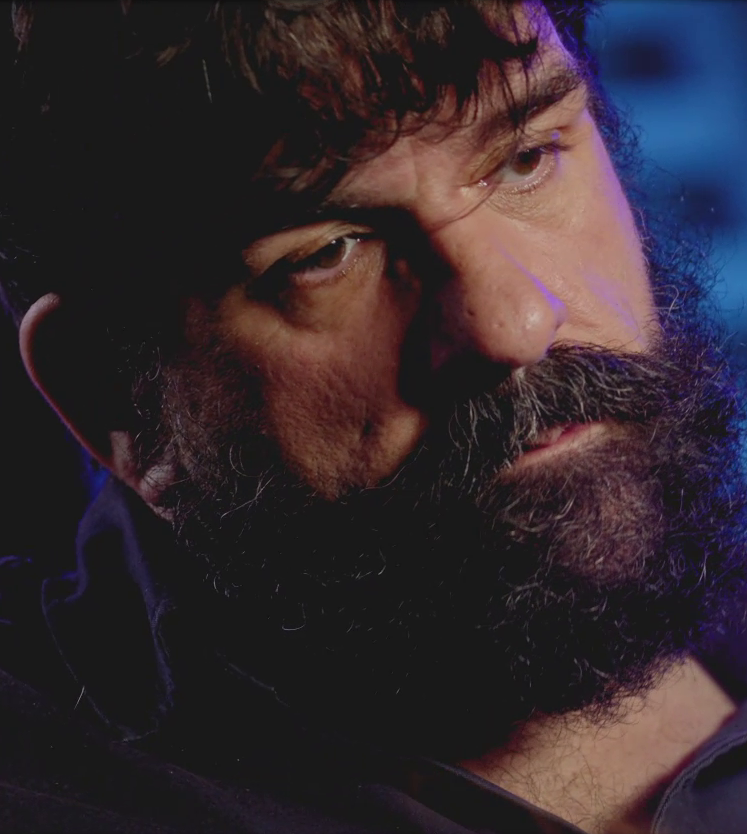
Cosimo Alemà

Cosimo Alemà (born 1970) is an Italian film director and music video director.

== Biography ==
Cosimo Alemà began working in music videos in the early 1990s, and after several years as an assistant director, he founded his own production company "The Mob". He has directed some 250 music videos for Italian and foreign artists. He has worked with, amongst others Zero Assoluto, Le Vibrazioni, Paola e Chiara, Max Pezzali, i Tiromancino, Anna Tatangelo, Nek, Finley, J-Ax, i Gemelli Diversi, Tiziano Ferro, Ligabue, Giusy Ferreri, Fabri Fibra, Marracash, Subsonica, Gianna Nannini, The Styles and TruceKlan, Club Dogo, and in 2009 Mina.

2011 saw the release of Cosimo's debut feature film 'War Games: At the End of the Day' which was distributed by Universal Pictures.

== Music ==
Since 2008 he has played guitar and keyboards in New Wave Indie band, Qali. They have produced one album.

== Partial filmography ==
- Quiet, episode of Intolerance (1996) - documentary
- Tutti intrusi (1997) - film
- Gonfiate la bambola (2000) - short film
- L'ospite perfetto - Room4U con Daniele Persica (2008) - series
- War Games: At the End of the Day (2010)

=== Music video ===
==== 1998 ====
- "T'innamorerò" - Marina Rei

==== 2002 ====
- "Un colpo in un istante" - Delta V

==== 2003 ====
- "Paradiso" - Angela Baraldi
- "Vieni da me" - Le Vibrazioni

==== 2004 ====
- "Come mi vorresti" - Renato Zero
- "Era il '72" - Rino Ceronti
- "Giornata solare" - Rino Ceronti
- "Libero nell'aria" - Sergio Cammariere
- "Oggi sono un demone" - Il Nucleo
- "Sexy Shop" - Erika Savastani

==== 2005 ====
- "Prendere o lasciare" - Alex Britti
- "Semplicemente" - Zero Assoluto
- "Una regola non c'è" - Tony Blescia

==== 2006 ====
- "Applausi per Fibra" - Fabri Fibra
- "Basterebbe una volta" - Pastora
- "Davvero" - Virginio
- "Fumo e cenere" - Finley
- "Idee stupide" - Fabri Fibra feat. Diego Mancino
- "Instabile" - Nek
- "Mi piaci" - Tormento
- "Sei parte di me" - Zero Assoluto
- "Sole di settembre" - Finley
- "Solo con te" - Alex Britti
- "Svegliarsi la mattina" - Zero Assoluto
- "Ti amo o ti ammazzo" - J-Ax
- "Tu mi fai star male" - Grandi animali marini

==== 2007 ====
- "Cosa stai dicendo" - Lombroso
- "Angoli di cielo" - Tiromancino
- "Appena prima di partire" - Zero Assoluto
- "Bugiardo" - Fabri Fibra
- "Dimmi" - Le Vibrazioni
- "Dimmi" - Rio
- "Domani" - Finley
- "E fuori è buio" - Tiziano Ferro
- "Figli del caos" - TwoFingerz
- "Il ritorno" - Gel
- "Lei" - Gel
- "Meglio così" - Zero Assoluto
- "Nesli Park" - Nesli
- "Notte di febbraio" - Nek
- "Portami via" - Le Vibrazioni
- "Sei felice" - Velvet
- "Splendidamente pazza" - Grandi animali marini
- "Stand Out" - Mas Ruido
- "Suave" - Cinema2
- "Testa rotta" - Cor Veleno
- "Theme from Paradise" - Figli di madre ignota
- "Torno subito" - Max Pezzali

==== 2008 ====
- "Cammina nel sole" - Gianluca Grignani
- "Canzone d'odio" - Syria
- "Change" - Coolio
- "Ciao e arrivederci" - Gianluca Grignani
- "Cosa stai dicendo" - Lombroso
- "Credi di conoscermi" - Lombroso
- "Il centro del mondo" (con Marco Salom) - Luciano Ligabue
- "Il vento" - Subsonica
- "In Italia" - Fabri Fibra feat. Gianna Nannini
- "La soluzione" - Fabri Fibra
- "Non ti scordar mai di me" - Giusy Ferreri
- "Novembre" - Giusy Ferreri
- "Oltre il mare" - TwoFingerz
- "Pane e merda" - Gel feat. Metal Carter, Cole e Noyz Narcos
- "Sex" - The Styles
- "Vuoi vedere che ti amo" - Gianluca Grignani
- "Ziza" - Patrizia Laquidara

==== 2009 ====
- "Adesso è facile" - Mina
- "Attimo" - Gianna Nannini
- "Cos'è normale" - Zero Assoluto
- "Il paese è reale" - Afterhours
- "Incomprensioni" - Fabri Fibra feat. Federico Zampaglione
- "Nessuno è perfetto" - Gemelli DiVersi
- "Per dimenticare" - Zero Assoluto
- "Per una lira" - Giuliano Palma & the Bluebeaters
- "Rose spezzate" - Anna Tatangelo
- "Sangue e cuore" - Rino de Maria
- "Speak English" - Fabri Fibra
- "Tempi bui" - Ministri
- "Un grande sole" - Giuliano Palma & the Bluebeaters
- "Uomo senza età" - Francesco Renga
- "Vivi per un miracolo" - Gemelli DiVersi

==== 2010 ====
- "Degni di esistere" (con Paolo Marchione) - Diana Tejera
- "Fino a qui tutto bene" - Marracash
- "Il cuore è uno zingaro" - Giuliano Palma & the Bluebeaters
- "L'applauso del cielo" - Lost
- "Milleluci" - Paola e Chiara
- "Nuvole rosa" - Giuliano Palma & the Bluebeaters
- "Rivincita" - Marracash feat. Giusy Ferreri
- "Stupido" - Marracash
- "Tranne te" - Fabri Fibra
- "Uppercut" - Motel Connection
- "Vip in Trip" - Fabri Fibra

==== 2011 ====
- "All'ultimo respiro" - Club Dogo
- "Io e la mia ombra" - Casino Royale
- "Istrice" - Subsonica
- "Le donne" - Fabri Fibra
- "Sensi" - Anna Tatangelo
- "Un pezzo d'estate" - Gabriella Ferrone

==== 2012 ====
- "L'amore è femmina" – Nina Zilli

==== 2025 ====
- "Che gusto c'è" – Fabri Fibra (feat. Tredici Pietro), "Stupidi" (feat. Papa V and Nerissima Serpe)
- "Cuore rotto" – Tiziano Ferro
