= Chi vuole essere Fabri Fibra? =

Chi vuole essere Fabri fibra

Studio album by Fabri Fibra
- Released: 10 April 2009
- Recorded: 2008
- Genre: Alternative hip hop
- Length: 41:05
- Label: Universal
- Producer: Big Fish; DJ Nais; Master Mind; Medeline

Fabri Fibra chronology
Bugiardo (2007)	Chi vuole essere Fabri fibra (2009)	Controcultura (2010)

Singles from Chi vuole essere Fabri Fibra?
- 1. "Incomprensioni" Released: 20 March 2009; 2. "Speak English" Released: 22 May 2009

Chi vuole essere Fabri Fibra? is the fifth studio album by Italian rapper Fabri Fibra. It was released on 10 April 2009 through Universal Music Group.

== Track listing ==
Chi vuole essere Fabri Fibra? track listing
No.	Title	Lyrics	Music	Producer(s)	Length
1.	"Chi vuole essere Fabri Fibra?" (featuring Daniele Vit)	Fabrizio Tarducci; Daniele Vit	Massimiliano Dagani; Luca Porzio; Vit; Marco Zangirolami	Big Fish; DJ Nais	3:57
2.	"10 euro in tasca" (featuring Supa)	Tarducci; Fabrizio Nano	Dagani; Porzio; Vit; Zangirolami	Big Fish; DJ Nais	4:07
3.	"Speak English"	Tarducci	Dagani; Porzio; Vit; Zangirolami	Big Fish; DJ Nais	3:57
4.	"Donna famosa"	Tarducci	Dagani; Porzio; Vit; Zangirolami	Big Fish; DJ Nais	4:21
5.	"Via vai" (featuring Dargen D'Amico)	Tarducci; Jacopo D'Amico	Stefano Breda	Master Mind	4:19
6.	"In quel posto"	Tarducci	Breda	Master Mind	3:55
7.	"Extralarge" (featuring Vincenzo da Via Anfossi)	Tarducci; Vincenzo De Cesare	Steve Fraschini; Rémi Tobbal	Medeline	3:43
8.	"In testa" (featuring Noyz Narcos)	Tarducci; Emanuele Frasca	Fraschini; Tobbal	Medeline	3:53
9.	"Alla fine di tutto questo"	Tarducci	Fraschini; Tobbal	Medeline	4:27
10.	"Incomprensioni" (featuring Federico Zampaglione)	Tarducci; Zampaglione; Camilla Triolo	Zampaglione; Dagani; Andrea Pesce	Big Fish	4:23
Total length:					41:05

== Charts ==
Chart (2009)	Peak position
Italian Albums (FIMI)	7

== Certifications ==
Region	Certification	Certified units/sales
Italy (FIMI)	Gold	30,000^{*}
^{*} Sales figures based on certification alone.
