= Bugiardo (album) =

Studio album by Fabri Fibra
- Released: 9 November 2007
- Recorded: 2007
- Genre: Hip hop; political hip hop
- Length: 65:05
- Label: Universal
- Producer: Big Fish; DJ Nais; Master Mind; Nesli; DJ Myke; Amadeus; Medeline; Svedonio; DJ Aladyn

Fabri Fibra chronology
Tradimento (2006)	Bugiardo (2007)	Chi vuole essere Fabri Fibra? (2009)

Singles from Bugiardo
- 1. "Bugiardo" Released: 26 October 2007; 2. "La soluzione" Released: 11 January 2008; 3. "In Italia" Released: 14 April 2008

Bugiardo is the fourth studio album by Italian rapper Fabri Fibra. It was released on 9 November 2007 through Universal Music.

An extended edition of the album, entitled Bugiardo², was released on 9 May 2008.

== Track listing ==
Bugiardo – Standard track listing
No.	Title	Lyrics	Music	Producer(s)	Length
1.	"Bugiardo"	Fabrizio Tarducci	Massimiliano Dagani; Luca Porzio	Big Fish; DJ Nais; Enrico Caruso	4:05
2.	"La soluzione"	Tarducci	Stefano Breda	Master Mind	3:57
3.	"Tu così bella non ce l'hai"	Tarducci	Antwan Thompson	Thompson	4:21
4.	"Andiamo a Sanremo"	Tarducci	Thompson	Thompson	5:13
5.	"Un'altra chance" (featuring Alborosie)	Tarducci; Alberto D'Ascola	Dagani; Porzio; Caruso	Big Fish; DJ Nais; Caruso	5:13
6.	"Cento modi per morire" (featuring Metal Carter)	Tarducci; Marco De Pascale	Thompson	Thompson	5:15
7.	"In Italia"	Tarducci	Dagani; Porzio; Caruso	Big Fish; DJ Nais; Caruso	3:39
8.	"Cattiverie"	Tarducci; Marco Zangirolami	Steve Fraschini; Rémi Tobbal; Zangirolami	Medeline	3:13
9.	"Questo è il nuovo singolo"	Tarducci	Fraschini; Tobbal; Guillaume Silvestri	Medeline	3:26
10.	"La posta di Fibra"	Tarducci	Dagani; Porzio; Caruso	Big Fish; DJ Nais; Caruso	5:00
11.	"Le ragazze" (featuring Nesli)	Tarducci; Francesco Tarducci	Tarducci	Nesli	4:21
12.	"Non c'è tempo"	Tarducci	Dagani; Porzio; Caruso	Big Fish; DJ Nais; Caruso	4:00
13.	"Sempre io"	Tarducci	Dagani; Porzio	Big Fish; DJ Nais; Caruso	3:41
14.	"Il più pazzo"	Tarducci	Tobbal; Fraschini	Medeline	3:18
15.	"Questa vita"	Tarducci	Tobbal; Fraschini	Medeline	3:28
16.	"Potevi essere tu"	Tarducci	Tobbal; Fraschini	Medeline	3:51
17.	"Non provo più niente" (ghost track)	Tarducci	Aldino Di Chiano; Marco Micheloni; Gabriele Tardiolo	DJ Myke; Svedonio; DJ Aladyn	4:55
Total length:					65:05

Bugiardo² – Deluxe edition bonus tracks
No.	Title	Lyrics	Music	Producer(s)	Length
7.	"In Italia" (remix; with Gianna Nannini)	Tarducci; Nannini	Dagani; Porzio; Caruso	Big Fish; DJ Nais; Caruso	3:29
18.	"Arrivano"	Tarducci	Breda	Master Mind	4:06
19.	"Hip hop"	Tarducci	Tobbal; Fraschini	Medeline	3:38
Total length:					76:05

== Charts ==
Chart (2007)	Peak position
Italian Albums (FIMI)	6

== Certifications ==
Region	Certification	Certified units/sales
Italy (FIMI) sales in 2007–2008	Platinum	80,000^{*}
Italy (FIMI) since 2009	Gold	25,000^{‡}
^{*} Sales figures based on certification alone.^{‡} Sales+streaming figures based on certification alone.
