= Mal di stomaco =

Single by Fabri Fibra

from the album Tradimento
- Released: 8 August 2006
- Recorded: 2006
- Genre: Political hip hop; hardcore hip hop
- Length: 4:42
- Label: Universal
- Songwriters: Fabrizio Tarducci; Francesco Tarducci; Massimiliano Dagani
- Producer: Nesli

Fabri Fibra singles chronology
| "Applausi per Fibra" (2006) | "Mal di stomaco" (2006) | "Bugiardo" (2007) |

Music video
- "Mal di stomaco" on YouTube

"Mal di stomaco" (transl. Stomachache) is a song by Italian rapper Fabri Fibra, released on 8 August 2006 through Universal Music Group as the second single from his third studio album Tradimento.

== Music video ==
The music video deals with Fabri Fibra's death, showing the reactions to the news by various Italian celebrities. The video's intro is a Sky TG24 skit which announces the artist's death, since fake news about Fibra's death were circulating at the time.

== Charts ==
| Chart (2006) | Peak position |
|---|---|
| Italy (FIMI) | 36 |
