= Tradimento =

Studio album by Fabri Fibra
- Released: 26 May 2006
- Recorded: 2006
- Genre: Hip hop; boom bap
- Length: 65:05
- Label: Universal
- Producer: Nesli; DJ Nais; Big Fish

Fabri Fibra chronology
Mr. Simpatia (2004)	Tradimento (2006)	Bugiardo (2007)

Singles from Tradimento
- 1. "Applausi per Fibra" Released: March 4, 2006; 2. "Mal di stomaco" Released: August 8, 2006

Tradimento is the third studio album by Italian rapper Fabri Fibra. It was released on 26 May 2006 through Universal Music Group, marking also the artist's first LP to be distributed by a major label.

The production is curated mainly by his younger brother and fellow musician Nesli, producing 7 out of 17 tracks, while the remaining are held by Big Fish and DJ Nais. The album was certified platinum by the Federation of the Italian Music Industry.

Tradimento is considered the album that opened the hip hop music to the great audience in Italy, giving to it mainstream popularity.

== Background ==
After his underground success with his second studio album Mr. Simpatia he signed a contract with Universal Music, a major label, and this was considered a betrayal by his older fans, so he decided to call the album Tradimento, which means betrayal. But even if he signed with a major label he decided to keep his hardcore style which attacks various political and social downsides.

== Track listing ==
All lyrics are written by Fabrizio Tarducci, except where noted.

No.	Title	Lyrics	Music	Producer(s)	Length
1.	"Rap in guerra"		Marco Greganti; Francesco Tarducci	Nesli	3:21
2.	"Su le mani"		Massimiliano Dagani; Luca Porzio	Big Fish	3:54
3.	"Applausi per Fibra"		Caruso; Dagani; Porzio	Big Fish; DJ Nais^{[c]}; Enrico Caruso^{[c]}	4:45
4.	"Mal di stomaco"		Dagani; Tarducci	Nesli	3:46
5.	"Ogni donna"		Greganti; Tarducci	Nesli	4:38
6.	"La pula bussò"	Tarducci; Oscar Avogadro; Daniele Pace	Dagani; Mario Lavezzi	Big Fish	4:04
7.	"Fai come noi"		Dagani; Tarducci	Nesli	4:53
8.	"Tutti in campana"		Caruso; Dagani; Porzio	Big Fish	2:48
9.	"Rompiti il collo"		Dagani; Porzio	Big Fish	2:29
10.	"Sono un soldato"		Greganti; Tarducci	Nesli	4:11
11.	"Coccole"		Caruso; Dagani; Porzio	Big Fish	3:28
12.	"Vaffanculo scemo" (featuring Nesli)	Fa. Tarducci; Fr. Tarducci	Greganti; Tarducci	Nesli	3:11
13.	"Il triangolo sì"		Caruso; Dagani; Porzio	Big Fish	3:48
14.	"Tutti matti"		Greganti; Tarducci	Nesli	5:15
15.	"Idee stupide" (featuring Diego Mancino)	Tarducci; Mancino	Caruso; Porzio	DJ Nais; Caruso	4:48
16.	"Che cazzata"		Dagani	Big Fish	4:00
17.	"Cuore di latta"		Dagani	Big Fish	5:03

Notes

- "Applausi per Fibra" contains an interpolation of "La porra", written by Andrea Visani and Giovanni Pellino, as performed by Sangue Misto.
- "La pula bussò" contains a sample of "E la luna bussò", written by Oscar Avogadro, Daniele Pace and Mario Lavezzi, as performed by Loredana Bertè.
- ^{^[c]} signifies a co-producer.

== Charts ==
Chart (2006)	Peak position
Italian Albums (FIMI)	1
Chart (2016)	Peak position
Italian Albums (FIMI)	3

== Certifications ==
Region	Certification	Certified units/sales
Italy (FIMI) sales in 2006	Platinum	120,000
Italy (FIMI) since 2009	Platinum	50,000^{‡}
^{‡} Sales+streaming figures based on certification alone.
