= Turbe giovanili =

Studio album by Fabri Fibra
- Released: February 2002
- Recorded: 2001–2002
- Genre: Hip hop
- Length: 59:27
- Label: Teste Mobili Records
- Producer: Neffa; Lato

Fabri Fibra chronology
Turbe giovanili (2002)	Mr. Simpatia (2004)

Turbe giovanili is the debut studio album by Italian rapper Fabri Fibra. It was released in February 2002 through Teste Mobili Records, and entirely produced by fellow rapper Neffa, except for the song "Ma che persona", produced by DJ Lato.

== Composition ==
Turbe giovanili is an intimate and dark album, focused on suburbs-related themese and on young people's uncertainty about the future, but it also features love songs, as well as some provocative and controversial lyrics.

Reissued multiple times over the following years, the album first charted on the Italian Albums Chart in May 2010, following the release—under Universal Music—of a new version of the record, remastered by Fabri Fibra and Marco Zangirolami. In 2019, it received a gold certification by the Federation of the Italian Music Industry, for domestic sales exceeding 25,000 equivalent album units since 2009.

On 27 September 2016, a numbered edition of the album, limited to 1,500 copies, was released on LP, with the first 700 copies printed on silver discs. In 2022, it was reissued on vinyl in both standard and deluxe editions. The latter includes a bonus cassette containing the instrumental parts of the album.

== Track listing ==
All tracks are written by Fabrizio Tarducci and Giovanni Pellino, except where noted.

Turbe giovanili – Standard track listing
No.	Title	Writer(s)	Length
1.	"Scattano le indagini"		3:50
2.	"Luna piena"		3:54
3.	"Dalla A alla Z"		2:47
4.	"Dove fuggi"		3:09
5.	"Di fretta"		3:40
6.	"Fuori norma"		4:01
7.	"Ci penso dopo"		2:25
8.	"Mi stai sul cazzo"		3:35
9.	"Per averti qui"		3:22
10.	"Come te" (featuring Al Castellana)	Tarducci; Pellino; Alessandro Castellana	5:04
11.	"Chi c'è"		3:01
12.	"Se non dai il meglio (Non io)"		4:25
13.	"In quanti?"		3:14
14.	"Nuovi stili d'insonnia"		4:02
15.	"Personaggi di passaggio" (featuring Nesli)	Tarducci; Pellino; Francesco Tarducci	3:35
16.	"Di noi"		4:26
17.	"Ma che persona"	Tarducci; Nicola Latini	2:58

Turbe giovanili – 2010 reissue bonus track
No.	Title	Length
18.	"Bonus Track"	4:16

== Charts ==
Chart (2022)	Peak position
Italian Albums (FIMI)	6

== Certifications ==
Region	Certification	Certified units/sales
Italy (FIMI)	Platinum	50,000^{‡}
^{‡} Sales+streaming figures based on certification alone.
