= Controcultura =

Studio album by Fabri Fibra
- Released: 7 September 2010
- Genre: Hip hop; pop rap
- Length: 67:44
- Label: Universal
- Producer: Antwan Thompson; Big Fish; DJ Nais; Michele Canova; Crookers; Medeline; The Buchanans; JFK; Dot Da Genius; Fyre Dept.

Fabri Fibra chronology
Chi vuole essere Fabri Fibra? (2009)	Controcultura (2010)	Guerra e pace (2013)

Singles from Controcultura
- 1. "Vip in Trip" Released: 27 July 2010; 2. "Tranne te" Released: 19 November 2010; 3. "Qualcuno normale" Released: 26 January 2011; 4. "Le donne" Released: 22 April 2011

Controcultura is the sixth studio album by Italian rapper Fabri Fibra. It was released on 7 September 2010 through Universal Music Group. Controcultura was supported by the release of four singles: "Vip in Trip", "Tranne te", "Qualcuno normale", and "Le donne".

The album topped the charts in Italy and peaked at number 79 in Switzerland.

== Track listing ==
Controcultura – Standard track listing
No.	Title	Lyrics	Music	Producer(s)	Length
1.	"6791"	Fabrizio Tarducci	Francesco Barbaglia; Andrea Fratangelo	Crookers	3:10
2.	"Escort"	Tarducci	James Cella	JFK	3:50
3.	"≠"	Tarducci	Antwan Thompson	Thompson	3:27
4.	"Double Trouble"	Tarducci	Chris Paultre; Kyle Davidson	The Buchanans	3:13
5.	"+-"	Tarducci	Paultre; Davidson	The Buchanans	3:38
6.	"Spara al diavolo"	Tarducci	Adam Deitch; Eric Krasno	Fyre Dept.	3:42
7.	"Controcultura"	Tarducci	Deitch; Krasno	Fyre Dept	4:35
8.	"Vip in Trip"	Tarducci	Michele Canova Iorfida	Canova	3:56
9.	"Qualcuno normale" (featuring Marracash)	Tarducci; Fabio Rizzo	Canova	Canova	3:20
10.	"Insensible" (featuring Dargen D'Amico)	Tarducci; Jacopo D'Amico	Oladipo Omishore	Dot da Genius	4:19
11.	"Tranne te"	Tarducci	Rémi Tobbal; Steve Fraschini; Guillaume Silvestri	Medeline	4:00
12.	"Non potete capire"	Tarducci	Thompson	Thompson	3:12
13.	"3 parole"	Tarducci	Massimiliano Dagani; Marco Zangirolami	Big Fish	4:22
14.	"Rivelazione"	Tarducci	Dagani; Zangirolami	Big Fish	3:46
15.	"Troppo famoso" (featuring Entics)	Tarducci; Cristiano Zuncheddu	Thompson	Thompson	3:02
16.	"Le donne"	Tarducci	Deitch; Krasno	Fyre Dept	4:01
17.	"In alto" (featuring Simona Barbieri)	Tarducci; Barbieri	Omishore	Dot da Genius	4:03
18.	"La fretta"	Tarducci	Porzio	DJ Nais	4:08
Total length:					67:44

Controcultura – iTunes edition bonus track
No.	Title	Lyrics	Music	Producer(s)	Length
19.	"Quorum"	Tarducci	Porzio	DJ Nais	3:28
Total length:					71:12

== Charts ==
=== Weekly charts ===
Chart (2010)	Peak position
Italian Albums (FIMI)	1
Swiss Albums (Schweizer Hitparade)	79

=== Classification in 2010 ===
Classification (2011)	Position
Italy	1

=== Final classification ===
Classification (2012)	Position
Italy	28

== Certifications ==
Region	Certification	Certified units/sales
Italy (FIMI)	2× Platinum	100,000^{*}
^{*} Sales figures based on certification alone.

== Ranking lists ==
Selected rankings of Controcultura
Publication	List	Rank	Ref.
Rolling Stone	The 100 Best Italian Albums of All Time	47	
