= Fenomeno =

Fenomeno may refer to:

- "Fenomeno" (Fabri Fibra song), 2017 song
- "Fenomeno" (Vasilis Karras song), 1998 song
- Fenomeno (album), a 2017 album by Fabri Fibra
- Fenomeno (horse), a Japanese Thoroughbred racehorse and sire
- O Fenômeno, a nickname for Ronaldo (Brazilian footballer)
- El Fenomeno (elfenomeno.com): Bilingual Spanish-English website about J.R.R. Tolkien and his works.
- Lamborghini Fenomeno, an Italian sports car
