= Bugiardo =

Single by Fabri Fibra

from the album Bugiardo
- Released: 26 October 2007
- Recorded: 2007
- Genre: Crunk
- Length: 4:05
- Label: Universal
- Songwriters: Fabrizio Tarducci; Massimiliano Dagani; Luca Porzio; Enrico Caruso
- Producers: Big Fish; DJ Nais; Enrico Caruso

Fabri Fibra singles chronology
"Mal di stomaco" (2006)	"Bugiardo" (2007)	"La soluzione" (2008)

Music video
- "Bugiardo" on YouTube

"Bugiardo" (transl. Liar) is a song by Italian rapper Fabri Fibra. It was released on 26 October 2007 through Universal Music Group as the lead single from his fourth studio album with the same name.

== Music video ==
The music video for "Bugiardo" was directed by Cosimo Alemà and features fellow rappers Nesli and Vacca and Italian radio host Nicola Savino, who labels Fibra "the worst artist he ever aired on his radio".

== Charts ==
Chart (2007)	Peak position
Italy (FIMI)	25
