= In Italia =

2008 single by Fabri Fibra

Single by Fabri Fibra and Gianna Nannini

from the album Bugiardo²
- Released: 14 April 2008
- Genre: Political hip hop
- Length: 3:29
- Label: Universal
- Songwriters: Fabrizio Tarducci; Gianna Nannini; Massimiliano Dagani; Luca Porzio; Enrico Caruso
- Producers: Big Fish; DJ Nais; Enrico Caruso

Fabri Fibra singles chronology
"La soluzione" (2008)	"In Italia" (2008)	"Incomprensioni" (2009)

Gianna Nannini singles chronology
"Suicidio d'amore" (2007)	"In Italia" (2008)	"Mosca cieca" (2008)

Music video
- "In Italia" on YouTube

"In Italia" is a song by Italian rapper Fabri Fibra and Italian singer Gianna Nannini. It was released on 14 April 2008 through Universal Music Italia and included in the deluxe edition of the rapper's third studio album Bugiardo².

"In Italia" is a political hip hop song, featuring several references to many social and economic problems in Italy. The song was also included in the soundtrack of the film Gomorrah directed by Matteo Garrone, based on the investigative journalism book of the same name by Roberto Saviano.

In 2024 Fabri Fibra re-recorded the song featuring Italian rapper Baby Gang and Italian singer Emma, with significant changes in production and lyrics.

== Composition and release ==
Produced by Dj Nais, Enrico Caruso and Big Fish, the track highlights many social and economic problems of contemporary Italy, including the high crime rate, medical malpractice, unemployment, precarious employment, corruption and mafia and the many deceptions in which the country is forced to live. The track features a quote from writer Roberto Saviano said in an interview with Enzo Biagi: "One of my dreams had been to stay in my land, tell my story and continue to resist".

For the album's re-issue, the song was released as a single in a new version featuring the vocal participation of Gianna Nannini, who sings the refrain.

== Music video ==
The music video was directed by Cosimo Alemà and published on the YouTube channel. It was shot entirely in black and white, and begins with Fabri Fibra on the couch of a psychologist, played by Ambra Angiolini. Fibra asked the psychologist if he could tell her about a recurring dream, after which the actual song begins. At this point, the scenes move to outdoor and metropolitan settings (including the Campo Verano in Rome), in which Gianna Nannini also appears during the refrain of the track. The video ends again in the psychologist's office, but with the roles of doctor and patient reversed, and then Ambra lying on the couch.

Originally, a cameo by Roberto Saviano was planned, but he has not taken part in the registration due to the protection protocol that has required him to live under escort since 13 October 2006 following the 2006 death threats by the Camorra cartels of the Casalesi clan.

== Charts ==
=== Weekly charts ===
Chart (2008)	Peak position
Italy (FIMI)	5

=== Year-end charts ===
Chart (2008)	Position
Italy (FIMI)	22

== Certifications ==
Region	Certification	Certified units/sales
Italy until 2008	—	30,000
Italy (FIMI) since 2009	Gold	25,000^{‡}
^{‡} Sales+streaming figures based on certification alone.

== In Italia 2024 ==
"In Italia 2024"

Single by Fabri Fibra featuring Emma and Baby Gang
- Released: 23 February 2024
- Genre: Political hip hop
- Length: 4:05
- Label: Epic; Sony
- Songwriters: Fabrizio Tarducci; Zaccaria Mouhib; Luca Porzio; Enrico Caruso; Massimiliano Dagani
- Producer: Big Fish

Fabri Fibra singles chronology
"Mondo panico" (2023)	"In Italia 2024" (2024)	"Fogliemorte" (2024)

Emma singles chronology
"Apnea" (2024)	"In Italia 2024" (2024)	"Femme fatale" (2024)

Baby Gang singles chronology
"Karma" (2024)	"In Italia 2024" (2024)	"Adrenalina" (2024)

Music video
- "In Italia 2024" on YouTube

"In Italia" is a song by Italian rapper Fabri Fibra. It was released on 23 February 2024 through Epic Records. The new version of the single featured vocals by Italian rapper Baby Gang and singer Emma Marrone, who sings the refrain originally performed by Nannini.

=== Rearrangement and composition ===
The song is a rearrangement of "In Italia" both lyrically and production-wise, under the musical direction of Big Fish. The song includes new cultural and social references to events in Italy since 2008, such as the disinformation of the Italian media, corruption, illicit appropriation of money, the Gaza War, the aversion to those with money, the military-industrial complex, haters on social networks, the murder of Stefano Cucchi, the unfair accusations on Enzo Tortora, racism in Italy and the association of the Meloni government and Brothers of Italy with neo-fascism.

Concerning the decision to re-record the song, Fabri Fibra himself explained that "In Italia" is "a demonstration of how a song, 17 years after its publication, can still have something to say so much that it can make its own way and make everyone feel the need to be reborn in a new version, with new voices and new rhymes".

=== Music video ===
The music video, directed as in the previous version by Cosimo Alemà, was released on 26 February 2024 on the rapper's YouTube channel. The filming took place at the monumental cemetery in Busto Arsizio, filming in particular the works of Brutalist architecture by architect Luigi Ciapparella and Richino Castiglioni.

=== Charts ===
Chart (2024)	Peak position
Italy (FIMI)	16

=== Certifications ===
Region	Certification	Certified units/sales
Italy (FIMI)	Platinum	100,000^{‡}
^{‡} Sales+streaming figures based on certification alone.
