= Applausi per Fibra =

Single by Fabri Fibra

from the album Tradimento
- Released: 4 April 2006
- Recorded: 2006
- Length: 4:08
- Label: Universal
- Songwriter: Fabri Fibra
- Producer: DJ Fish

Fabri Fibra singles chronology
"Applausi per Fibra" (2006)	"Mal di stomaco" (2006)

Music video
- "Applausi per Fibra" on YouTube

"Applausi per Fibra" (Italian for 'Applause for Fibra') is the first single released by Fabri Fibra from his third solo studio album Tradimento, released in 2006.

== Music video ==
The video for "Applausi per Fibra" was directed by Cosimo Alemà.

The video features Fibra, Big Fish, Nesli and others, including dancers with a white face and an "X" on eyes and mouths, alternating in front of the camera. The catchphrase of the video is "Io odio Fabri Fibra" (I hate Fabri Fibra).

== Charts ==
Chart (2006)	Peak position
France (SNEP)	73
Italy (FIMI)	6

== Certifications ==
Region	Certification	Certified units/sales
Italy (FIMI)	4× Platinum	200,000^{‡}
^{‡} Sales+streaming figures based on certification alone.

== Cover versions ==
- In 2008, the band Potap i Nastya recorded a Russian version of the song called "Na RaYone".
