= Mr. Simpatia =

Studio album by Fabri Fibra
- Released: 1 September 2004
- Recorded: 2003–2004
- Genres: Hardcore hip hop; horrorcore
- Length: 67:12
- Label: Vibrarecords
- Producers: Nesli; Bassi Maestro; Bosca

Fabri Fibra chronology
Turbe giovanili (2002)	Mr. Simpatia (2004)	Tradimento (2006)

Mr. Simpatia is the second studio album by Italian rapper Fabri Fibra. It was released on 1 September 2004 through Vibrarecords.

== Track listing ==
All tracks are written by Fabrizio Tarducci and Francesco Tarducci, except where noted.

No.	Title	Writer(s)	Length
1.	"L'uomo nel mirino"		3:23
2.	"Gonfio così"		3:46
3.	"Io non ti invidio"	Fabrizio Tarducci; Davide Bassi	3:22
4.	"Venerdì 17"		3:38
5.	"Solo una botta"		3:52
6.	"Momenti no"		4:24
7.	"Da questo locale"		3:22
8.	"Rap in vena"		3:34
9.	"Niente male"		4:17
10.	"Faccio sul serio"		3:03
11.	"Non crollo"		3:59
12.	"Non fare la puttana"		3:21
13.	"Voglio farti un regalo"		4:16
14.	"Palle piene"		3:31
15.	"Mr. Simpatia"		4:19
16.	"Andiamo" (featuring Nesli – extended version)		5:00
17.	"Tienila su"		2:21
18.	"Bonus Track"		3:44

== In popular culture ==
Mr. Simpatia is considered one of the most important and influential Italian hip hop albums. The rapper MadMan quoted it in his debut album Escape from Heart, on the track "Trash Music". In the verse, Madman says that like a Christian knows by heart the Ave Maria and other prayers, he knows by heart some records that have made the history of Italian hip hop, which for him is religion.

== Charts ==
Chart (2017)	Peak position
Italian Albums (FIMI)	63
Chart (2019)	Peak position
Italian Albums (FIMI)	97
Chart (2020)	Peak position
Italian Albums (FIMI)	91

== Certifications ==
Region	Certification	Certified units/sales
Italy (FIMI)	2× Platinum	100,000^{‡}
^{‡} Sales+streaming figures based on certification alone.
