= Fenomeno (album) =

Studio album by Fabri Fibra
- Released: 7 April 2017
- Recorded: 2015–2017
- Genre: Hip hop
- Length: 61:58
- Label: Universal
- Producer: Neff-U; Takagi & Ketra; Big Fish; Alessandro Erba; Antwan Thompson; Bassi Maestro; MACE; Demacio "Demo" Castellon; Mike Turco; Rhade; Shablo; Nebbia; Deleterio; 2nd Roof; Don Joe; Yung Snapp; Rey Reel; Bot; Snipe Young

Fabri Fibra chronology
Squallor (2015)	Fenomeno (2017)	Il tempo vola 2002-2020 (2019)

Singles from Fenomeno
- 1. "Fenomeno" Released: 3 March 2017; 2. "Pamplona" Released: 5 May 2017; 3. "Stavo pensando a te" Released: 22 September 2017

Fenomeno is the ninth studio album by Italian rapper Fabri Fibra. It was released on 7 April 2017 through Universal Music Group.

The album peaked at number one on the Italian Albums Chart, becoming the rapper fourth record project to achieve it. It was certified double platinum by FIMI and promoted by three singles: "Fenomeno", "Pamplona" and "Stavo pensando a te".

== Background and composition ==
After the unpromoted and surprise release of Squallor (2015), the rapper started to work on his ninth studio album. The album has several producers and songwriters, including Takagi & Ketra, Bassi Maestro, Club Dogo, Davide Petrella, Dario Faini, Theron Feemster and Snipe Young. The project featured less guest artists than his previous record project, collaborating with Thegiornalisti, Laioung and Italian writer and journalist Roberto Saviano.

The tracks deal with themes concerning the rapper's childhood, youth unemployment in Italy, the change of the hip-hop and trap genre in Italy, as well as several debates with his brother Nesli and ironises Fedez's commercial rap.

== Critics reception ==
Michele Boroni of Rockol described the album as an affirmation of "the primal success of rap in Italy as redemption for those who thought it was done". Although thematically similar to previous productions, the critic noted that "the complexity of certain convoluted, double-triple-meaning rhymes make way for drier stanzas" while the sounds are set on "much softer instrumental foundations".

Michele Monina of Il Fatto Quotidiano wrote that Fenomeno is "as far from the hostile Squallor as its logical consequence", who is composed of "straighter, lighter bases, over which Fibra does Fibra, with his highly recognisable flow" and "it is as cutting as perhaps ever, by virtue of a maturity, even of age".

== Track listing ==
Fenomeno track listing
No.	Title	Lyrics	Music	Producers	Length
1.	"Intro"	Fabrizio Tarducci	Tarducci	Fabri Fibra	2:05
2.	"Red Carpet"	Tarducci	Theron Feemster	Neff-U; Snipe Young	3:35
3.	"Fenomeno"	Tarducci	Alessandro Merli; Fabio Clemente	Takagi & Ketra	3:19
4.	"Skit – Il tempo vola"	Tarducci	Massimiliano Dagani; Alessandro Erba	Big Fish; Erba	0:59
5.	"Money for Dope 2017"	Tarducci; Daniele Fabbri	Davide Bassi	Bassi Maestro	4:21
6.	"Pamplona" (featuring Thegiornalisti)	Tarducci; Davide Petrella	Dario Faini; Simone Benussi; Vanni Casagrande	MACE	3:44
7.	"Equilibrio"	Tarducci	Antwan Thompson	Thompson	4:16
8.	"Skit – Considerazioni" (featuring Roberto Saviano)	Tarducci; Saviano	Bassi	Bassi Maestro	1:38
9.	"Cronico"	Tarducci	Michael Turco; Don Juan Demarco Casanova	Mike Turco; Demacio "Demo" Castellon	3:37
10.	"Stavo pensando a te"	Tarducci	Dagani; Mario Fracchiolla	Big Fish; Rhade	4:24
11.	"Lascia stare"	Tarducci	Pablo Miguel Lombroni Capalbo	Shablo	3:15
12.	"Dipinto di blu" (featuring Laïoung)	Tarducci; Giuseppe Bockarie Consoli	Antonio La Fata	Nebbia	3:18
13.	"Invece no"	Tarducci	Piermarco Gianotti	Deleterio	4:03
14.	"Ogni giorno"	Tarducci	Federico Vaccari; Pietro Miano	2nd Roof	5:11
15.	"Le vacanze"	Tarducci	Luigi Florio; Antonio Lago	Don Joe; Yung Snapp	4:45
16.	"Nessun aiuto"	Tarducci	Raymond De'Andre Martin	Rey Reel	4:36
17.	"Ringrazio"	Tarducci	Andrea Fratangelo	Bot	4:52

== Personnel ==
Performers

- Fabri Fibra
- Thegiornalisti – track 6
- Roberto Saviano – track 8
- Laïoung – track 12

Producers

- Neff-U – track 2
- Takagi & Ketra – track 3
- Big Fish – tracks 4 and 10
- Alessandro Erba – track 4
- Amadeus – track 7
- Bassi Maestro – tracks 5 and 8
- Mace – track 6
- Demacio "Demo" Castellon, Mike Turco – track 9
- Rhade – track 10
- Shablo – track 11
- Nebbia – track 12
- Deleterio – track 13
- 2nd Roof – track 14
- Don Joe, Yung Snapp – track 15
- Rey Reel – track 16
- Bot – track 17

== Charts ==
=== Weekly charts ===
Chart (2017)	Peak position
Italian Albums (FIMI)	1
Switzerland (Schweizer Hitparade)	52

=== Year-end charts ===
Chart (2017)	Position
Italian Albums (FIMI)	9

== Certifications ==
Region	Certification	Certified units/sales
Italy (FIMI)	2× Platinum	100,000^{‡}
^{‡} Sales+streaming figures based on certification alone.
