= Reggie (album) =

Redman Presents...Reggie

Studio album by Redman
- Released: December 7, 2010
- Genre: East Coast hip-hop
- Length: 43:51
- Label: Gilla House; Def Squad; Def Jam
- Producer: Rockwilder; the Audibles; the Fyre Dept.; the Futuristiks; Team Ready; DJ Khalil; M-Phazes; Tone Mason; J. Rob; Freak; Rich Kidd; ThreeSixty; Ty Fyffe; Efrain "F.A.M.E." Rodriguez; King David

Redman chronology
Blackout! 2 (2009)	Redman Presents...Reggie (2010)	Mudface (2015)

Singles from Reggie
- 1. "Def Jammable" Released: October 26, 2010; 2. "Rocking With The Best" Released: January 25, 2011

Redman Presents...Reggie is the seventh studio album by rapper Redman. It was released on December 7, 2010, through his own label Gilla House Records and Erick Sermon's Def Squad Records in conjunction with Def Jam Recordings. The original title of the album, as promoted in the booklet of Blackout! 2, was going to be Reggie Noble "0" 9 1/2. It would also be his final album with Def Jam, after being signed to the label for 19 years.

== Background ==
During an interview, Redman stated that Reggie Noble (Redman's own birth name), does the album, not Redman. Redman also said that there is going to be more "poppish" type songs, rather than his normal "rugged" and "hardcore" songs. In regards to the album, he stated:

Yeah the new album Reggie. It's just the alter ego of Redman. Just stepping up a little bit more. On the new Reggie album there is an alter ego or whatever. I just wanted to step out the box a little bit. The beats are bigger. You won't be hearing none of the Redman antics like you usually hear, like the hard beats, Superman Lova of skits. You know just a little step out the box. I was actually doing this album when I was doing the Blackout! 2 album with Meth. It was supposed to be a mixtape, but it came out as an album. I was actually supposed to put out Muddy Waters 2 now, but this album came along. I'm gonna put out this album then Muddy Waters 2 next.

== Release singles and promotion ==
The song titled "Coc Back" was the first single off the new album and features Ready Roc. The song and music video for the single were released simultaneously on October 31, 2009 through many websites. The first promotional single titled "Oh My" was released digitally online on January 25, 2010.

The next single, "Mind on My Money" was also released digitally online on March 2, 2010. A promo track titled "Lookin' Fly" has also been leaked by Redman. A video for "Lookin' Fly" was released on June 9, 2010. As it turns out, none of these tracks will make the final cut of the album, only being promo singles. The first official single is "Def Jammable" and a video for the single was released. This is the first Redman album where Erick Sermon won't be doing any production. The second official single is "Rockin' Wit Da Best" featuring Kool Moe Dee and was released on January 25, 2011.

Professional ratings
Aggregate scores
Source	Rating
Metacritic	57/100
Review scores
Source	Rating
AllMusic	3.5/5 stars
RapReviews	7.5/10
The Smoking Section	2.5/5 stars

== Track listing ==
Credits adapted from the album's liner notes.

No.	Title	Writer(s)	Producer(s)	Length
1.	"Reggie" (Intro)	Reggie Noble; John Groover; Michael Cox, Jr.; Yaasiel Davis; Ahmad Jamal	The Futuristiks; Team Ready (co.)	1:40
2.	"That's Where I B" (featuring DJ Kool)	Noble; Tyrone Fyffe; Efrain Rodgiruez, Jr.	Ty Fyffe; Efrain "F.A.M.E." Rodriguez (co.)	3:03
3.	"Def Jammable"	Noble; Khalil Abdul-Rahman; Daniel Tannenbaum	DJ Khalil	3:04
4.	"Full Nelson" (featuring Ready Roc, Runt Dawg, and Saukrates)	Noble; Karl Wailoo; Armon Johnson; Shariff Williams; Anthony McIntyre	Tone Mason	3:43
5.	"Lift It Up"	Noble; Jonathan Wesley Robinson	J. Rob	2:16
6.	"All I Do" (featuring Faith Evans)	Noble; Fred Hicklin; Melanie Rutherford; Faith Evans	Freak!!	3:58
7.	"Lemme Get 2" (featuring Saukrates)	Noble; Wailoo; Ritchie Acheampong	Rich Kidd	4:00
8.	"Mic, Lights, Camera, Action"	Noble; Dana Stinson	Rockwilder	3:35
9.	"Cheerz" (featuring Ready Roc and Melanie Rutherford)	Noble; Johnson; Mark Landon	M-Phazes	4:22
10.	"Rockin' wit da Best" (featuring Kool Moe Dee)	Noble; Mohandes Dewese; Orlando Sedoc	ThreeSixty	2:59
11.	"Lite 1 Witcha Boi" (featuring Method Man and Bun B)	Noble; Clifford Smith; Bernard Freeman; Dominic Jordan; Jimmy Giannos	The Audibles	3:53
12.	"When the Lights Go Off" (featuring Poo Bear)	Noble; David Manzoor; Jason Boyd	King David	4:48
13.	"Tiger Style Crane"	Noble; Adam Deitch; Eric Krasno	The Fyre DEPT.	2:40
Total length:				43:51

Leftover tracks

- "Coc Back" (featuring Ready Roc)
- "Oh My"
- "M.O.M.M."

Sample credits

- "Reggie (Intro)" contains samples of "Swahililand", written and performed by Ahmad Jamal.
