= Mentre Los Angeles brucia =

Studio album by Fabri Fibra
- Released: 20 June 2025
- Recorded: 2024–2025
- Genres: Hip hop; pop rap; trap
- Label: Epic
- Producers: Chef P; Fritu; Luke Giordano; Medeline; Marz; Bias; Nikidefre; Zef

Fabri Fibra chronology
Caos (2022)	Mentre Los Angeles brucia (2025)

Singles from Mentre Los Angeles brucia
- 1. "Che gusto c'è" Released: 23 May 2025; 2. "Stupidi" Released: 13 June 2025; 3. "Milano Baby" Released: 22 August 2025; 4. "Vivo" Released: 5 December 2025; 5. "Goya" Released: 21 August 2026

Mentre Los Angeles brucia (lit. 'While Los Angeles Burns') is the eleventh studio album by Italian rapper Fabri Fibra, released on 20 June 2025 through Epic Records.

== Track listing ==
Mentre Los Angeles brucia – Standard track listing
No.	Title	Lyrics	Music	Producer(s)	Length
1.	"L'avvelenata (pretesto)" (featuring Francesco Guccini)	Fabrizio Tarducci; Guccini	Alessandro Pulga; Stefano Tognini	Marz; Zef	2:32
2.	"Che gusto c'è" (featuring Tredici Pietro)	Tarducci; Davide Petrella	Tognini	Zef	3:03
3.	"Salsa piccante" (featuring Gaia and Massimo Pericolo)	Tarducci; Gaia Gozzi; Alessandro Vanetti; Petrella	Pulga; Tognini	Marz; Zef	2:47
4.	"Karma Ok"	Tarducci	Pulga; Tognini	Marz; Zef	2:49
5.	"Milano Baby" (featuring Joan Thiele)	Tarducci; Petrella	Pulga; Tognini; Luca Giordano	Marz; Zef; Luke Giordano	3:49
6.	"Come finirà?"	Tarducci	Rémi Tobbal	Medeline	3:50
7.	"Tutti pazzi"	Tarducci	Pulga; Tognini	Marz; Zef	2:05
8.	"Tossico"	Tarducci	Pietro Miano; Niccolò De Frenza; Eric Yoda	Chef P; Nikidefre	2:43
9.	"Sbang" (featuring Noyz Narcos)	Tarducci; Emanuele Frasca	Pulga; Tognini	Marz; Zef	2:44
10.	"Stupidi" (featuring Papa V and Nerissima Serpe)	Tarducci; Lorenzo Vinciguerra; Matteo Di Falco; Petrella	Pulga; Tognini	Marz; Zef	3:05
11.	"Tutto andrà bene"	Tarducci	Pulga; Tognini; Giordano	Marz; Zef; Giordano	3:21
12.	"Mio padre"	Tarducci	Pulga; Tognini	Marz; Zef	2:31
13.	"Vivo"	Tarducci; Andrea Laszlo De Simone	De Simone; Miano	Chef P	3:48
14.	"Figlio"	Tarducci	Nicolas Biasin	Bias	3:01
15.	"Cometa"	Tarducci	Enzo Avitabile; Federico Masia	Fritu	2:24
16.	"Mentre Los Angeles brucia"	Tarducci	Pulga; Tognini	Marz; Zef	2:38
17.	"Verso altri lidi"	Tarducci	Miano	Chef P	3:21

Mentre Los Angeles brucia – Physical edition bonus tracks and digital re-issue bonus tracks
No.	Title	Lyrics	Music	Producer(s)	Length
18.	"Stammi vicino"	Tarducci	Pulga; Tognini	Marz; Zef	2:51
19.	"Invidia"	Tarducci	Pulga; Tognini; Giordano	Marz; Zef; Giordano	3:15
20.	"Sinner"	Tarducci	Pulga; Tognini	Marz; Zef	2:40
21.	"La fine del mondo"	Tarducci	Pulga; Tognini	Marz; Zef	3:12
22.	"Mille volte"	Tarducci	Pulga; Tognini	Marz; Zef	2:19
23.	"Russian Roulette" (featuring Ernia)	Tarducci; Matteo Professione	Pulga; Tognini	Marz; Zef	2:19

Mentre Los Angeles brucia – Deluxe edition bonus tracks
No.	Title	Lyrics	Music	Producer(s)	Length
1.	"Non dormo più" (featuring Frah Quintale)	Tarducci; Francesco Servidei; Petrella	Tognini	Zef	2:41
2.	"La mia musica"	Tarducci	Tognini; Enrico Simonetti	Zef	2:31
3.	"Goya" (featuring Pinguini Tattici Nucleari)	Tarducci; Riccardo Zanotti	Tognini	Zef	2:55
4.	"FICT"	Tarducci	Tognini; Daniele Sartori; Pierfrancesco Pasini	Zef	2:14

== Reception ==
Billboard Italia ranked the album as the fifth best Italian album of the year, while Rolling Stone Italia ranked it 23rd.

== Charts ==
Weekly chart performance for Mentre Los Angeles brucia
Chart (2024)	Peak position
Italiam Albums (FIMI)	1
Swiss Albums (Schweizer Hitparade)	23

== Certifications ==
Region	Certification	Certified units/sales
Italy (FIMI)	Platinum	50,000^{‡}
^{‡} Sales+streaming figures based on certification alone.
