= Rapstar (group) =

Italian hip-hop duo

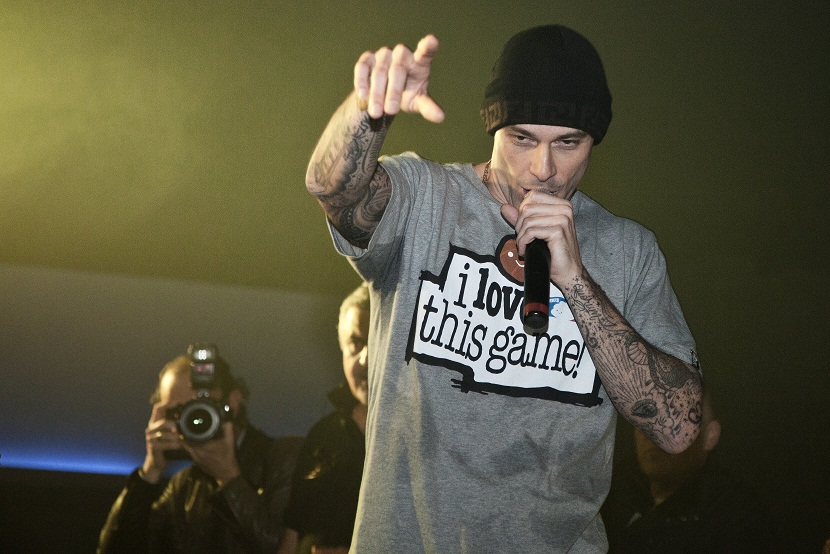
- Fabri Fibra, member of the group

Background information
- Origin: Milan, Italy
- Genres: Hip hop
- Years active: 2012–2014
- Labels: Tempi Duri Records; Universal Music
- Members: Fabri Fibra; Clementino

Rapstar is a hip hop duo consisting of two Italian rappers, Fabri Fibra and Clementino.

== Debut album ==
Clementino met Fabri Fibra in the summer of 2011 at the Controcultura Tour of Fabri Fibra in Naples, and immediately they began to record together. The initial idea, as stated by Clementino in an interview, was simply to make a mixtape. Subsequently, however, both changed their minds and decided to produce a whole album. On January 9, 2012, a double single: "Ci rimani male/Chimica Brother" was released. Non è gratis, the debut album of the band, was released on January 31, 2012.

== Discography ==
=== Album ===
- 2012 – Non è gratis

=== Singles ===
- 2012 – Ci rimani male/Chimica Brother [Double single]
