= Fenomeno (Fabri Fibra song) =

Single by Fabri Fibra

from the album Fenomeno
- Released: 3 March 2017
- Recorded: 2017
- Length: 3:20
- Label: Universal
- Songwriters: Fabri Fibra; Alessandro Merli; Fabio Clemente
- Producer: Takagi & Ketra

Fabri Fibra singles chronology
"Lo sto facendo" (2016)	"Fenomeno" (2017)	"Pamplona" (2017)

Music video
- "Fenomeno" on YouTube

"Fenomeno" (transl. 'Wonder', lit. 'Phenomenon') is a song by Italian rapper Fabri Fibra released on 3 March 2017 as the lead single from his ninth studio album of the same name.

It is a remake of a song Fibra wrote in 2003, "La cosa più facile" from the 2004 EP Lato & Fabri Fibra, when he was a member of the group Uomini di Mare.

== Music video ==
The music video for "Fenomeno", directed by Cosimo Alemà, was released on YouTube on the same day.

== Charts ==
Chart (2017)	Peak position
Italy (FIMI)	12
Italy Airplay (EarOne)	10

== Certifications ==
Region	Certification	Certified units/sales
Italy (FIMI)	2× Platinum	100,000^{‡}
^{‡} Sales+streaming figures based on certification alone.
