= Che gusto c'è =

Single by Fabri Fibra featuring Tredici Pietro

from the album Mentre Los Angeles brucia
- Released: 23 May 2025
- Length: 3:03
- Label: Epic
- Songwriters: Fabri Fibra; Davide Petrella; Zef
- Producers: Zef; Marz

Fabri Fibra singles chronology
| "Zelensky" (2025) | "Che gusto c'è" (2025) | "Stupidi" (2025) |

Tredici Pietro singles chronology
| "Verità" (2025) | "Che gusto c'è" (2025) | "La fretta" (2025) |

Music video
- "Che gusto c'è" on YouTube

"Che gusto c'è" (transl. What's the fun) is a song by Italian rapper Fabri Fibra, with featured vocals by Tredici Pietro. It was released on 23 May 2025 by Epic Records as the lead single from Fibra's eleventh studio album, Mentre Los Angeles brucia.

The song was written by the artist with Davide Petrella and produced by Zef and Marz.

== Music video ==
A music video for "Che gusto c'è", directed by Cosimo Alemà, was released onto YouTube on 30 May 2025. The video features various Italian celebrities, including Alessandro Borghese, Alessandro Cattelan, Rose Villain, Gianluca Gazzoli, and Wad.

== Charts ==
=== Weekly charts ===
Weekly chart performance for "Che gusto c'è"
| Chart (2025) | Peak position |
|---|---|
| Italy (FIMI) | 6 |
| Italy Airplay (EarOne) | 4 |

=== Year-end charts ===
Year-end chart performance for "Che gusto c'è"
| Chart (2025) | Position |
|---|---|
| Italy (FIMI) | 48 |

== Certifications ==
| Region | Certification | Certified units/sales |
|---|---|---|
| Italy (FIMI) | Platinum | 200,000^{‡} |
^{‡} Sales+streaming figures based on certification alone.
