= Full Circle (Xzibit album) =

Studio album by Xzibit
- Released: October 17, 2006
- Recorded: 2005–06
- Studio: Sony Music Studios (New York City); StarBass Enterprise Recording Studios (New Jersey); Planet 2 Planet Studios (New York City)
- Genre: Hip hop
- Length: 59:31
- Label: Open Bar; Koch
- Producer: Keith Shocklee (exec.); Xzibit (exec.); Jelly Roll (also exec.); Allstar; DJ Felli Fel; DJ Khalil; DJ Quik; Dublin Beats; Fyre Dept.; Rick Rock; The Arkitects; Warryn Campbell

Xzibit chronology
Weapons of Mass Destruction (2004)	Full Circle (2006)	Napalm (2012)

Singles from Full Circle
- 1. "Concentrate" Released: September 29, 2006; 2. "Family Values" Released: November 4, 2006; 3. "Thank You" Released: December 11, 2006

Professional ratings
Review scores
Source	Rating
AllMusic	4/5 stars
HipHopDX	3.5/5
laut.de	4/5 stars
PopMatters	8/10
RapReviews	8.5/10
Rolling Stone	2/5 stars
Spin	3/5 stars
The Skinny	2/5 stars
XXL	4/5

Full Circle is the sixth studio album by American rapper Xzibit. It was released on October 17, 2006, via Open Bar Entertainment and Koch Records. Recording sessions took place at Sony Music Studios and Planet 2 Planet Studios in New York, and StarBass Enterprise Recording Studios in New Jersey. Production was handled by Allen Gordon, DJ Felli Fel, DJ Khalil, DJ Quik, Dublin Beats, Fyre Dept., Rick Rock, The Arkitects, Warryn Campbell, and Jelly Roll, who also served as executive producer together with Keith Shocklee and Xzibit. It features guest appearances from Jelly Roll, Kurupt, Daz Dillinger, DJ Quik, Don Blaze, King Tee, The Game, Too $hort, T-Pain and Donnell Rawlings.

The album debuted at number 50 on the Billboard 200 with first-week sales of 17,000 copies in the US. It also peaked at number 74 on the Swiss Hitparade. Its lead single, "Concentrate", which sampled and looped "Namu Myōhō Renge Kyō", a mantra that is chanted as the central practice of all forms of Nichiren Buddhism, made it to number 68 in Germany. Music videos were released for singles "Concentrate" and "Thank You".

In a 2008 interview with Nima Etminan for Dubcnn, Xzibit addressed the criticism of the album, particularly regarding its production. He acknowledged that not everyone received the album well, stating, "If people didn't receive the music well, then they didn't receive the music well." He explained that he created the album quickly, "I put that record together in two months with the producers that I had around me," which was a departure from his usual year-long process. Despite mixed reviews, he remains confident in his approach: "It feels good to me."

Initially the lead single for the album was supposed to be "Thank You" but the record label felt like "Concentrate" should be the lead single as they felt it would be better received and played on the radio based on what was on MTV and the Billboard Charts. Xzibit stated in the interview that he didn't push back enough on the decision and takes the blame for it.

== Track listing ==
No.	Title	Writer(s)	Producer(s)	Length
1.	"Invade My Space" (featuring Jelly Roll)	Alvin Joiner; David Drew	Jelly Roll	5:19
2.	"Rollin'" (featuring Jelly Roll)	Joiner; Drew	Jelly Roll	4:14
3.	"Ram Part Division"	Joiner; David Blake	DJ Quik	4:06
4.	"Say It to My Face" (featuring Kurupt and Don Blaze)	Joiner; LeDon Moses; Allen Gordon Jr.; Joel Campbell	Allen "AllStar" Gordon	4:11
5.	"The Donnell Rawlings Show (Skit)" (featuring Donnell Rawlings)			1:43
6.	"Scandalous Bitches"	Joiner; Adam Deitch; Eric Krasno	Fyre Dept.	3:06
7.	"Concentrate"	Joiner; Ricardo Thomas	Rick Rock	3:51
8.	"On Bail" (featuring The Game, Daz Dillinger and T-Pain)	Joiner; Jayceon Taylor; Delmar Arnaud; Faheem Najm; James Corrine	DJ Felli Fel	4:40
9.	"Family Values"	Joiner; Justin James Jayankura; Nile Rodgers; Bernard Edwards	Dublin Beats aka J-Dubz	3:55
10.	"Black & Brown" (featuring Jelly Roll)	Joiner; Marshall Leathers; Sean Campbell	The Arkitects	5:50
11.	"The Whole World"	Joiner; Drew	Jelly Roll	4:23
12.	"Poppin' Off" (featuring DJ Quik and King Tee)	Joiner; Blake; Roger McBride; Khalil Abdul-Rahman	DJ Khalil	4:16
13.	"Movin' in Your Chucks" (featuring Too $hort and Kurupt)	Joiner; Todd Shaw; Ricardo Brown; Drew; Lionel Hunt; Jerry Long; Kevin Gilliam	Jelly Roll	4:57
14.	"Thank You"	Joiner; Warryn Campbell	Baby Dubb	5:00
Total length:				59:31

Best Buy bonus tracks
No.	Title	Producer(s)	Length
15.	"Concentrate (Remix)" (featuring San Quinn)	Rick Rock	3:51
16.	"Rollin' (West Side Remix)"	Jelly Roll	4:19
17.	"A Minute to Pray"	Rick Rock	4:19

Sample credits

- Track 9 contains elements of "Savior Faire" written by Nile Rodgers and Bernard Edwards as performed by Chic
- Track 13 contains elements of "Dollaz, Drank & Dank" written by Lionel Hunt, Jerry Long and Kevin Gilliam as performed by Mr. Short Khop

== Personnel ==
- Alvin "Xzibit" Joiner – vocals, executive producer
- David "JellyRoll" Drew – vocals (tracks: 1, 2, 10), producer (tracks: 1, 2, 11, 13), executive producer
- Ricardo "Kurupt" Brown – vocals (tracks: 4, 13)
- LeDon "Don Blaze" Moses – vocals (track 4)
- Donnell Rawlings – vocals (track 5)
- Jayceon "The Game" Taylor – vocals (track 8)
- Delmar "Daz Dillinger" Arnaud – vocals (track 8)
- Faheem "T-Pain" Najm – vocals (track 8)
- David "DJ Quik" Blake – vocals (track 12), producer (track 3)
- Roger "King T" McBride – vocals (track 12)
- Todd "Too Short" Shaw – vocals (track 13)
- Anthony Martin "DJ Reflex" Jaramillo – scratches (track 3), project coordination (track 14)
- Nick Thorpe – strings conducting and orchestration (tracks: 9, 14)
- Allen "AllStar" Gordon Jr. – producer & recording (track 4)
- June "Mr. President" Archer – production coordinator (track 4)
- Adam Deitch – producer (track 6)
- Eric Peter Krasno – producer (track 6)
- Kirk Yano – engineering (track 6)
- Ricardo "Rick Rock" Thomas – producer (track 7)
- James "DJ Felli Fel" Corrine – producer (track 8)
- Justin James "Dublin Beats" Jayankura – producer (track 9)
- Marshall Leathers – producer (track 10)
- Sean Campbell – producer (track 10)
- Khalil Abdul-Rahman – producer (track 12)
- Warryn "Baby Dubb" Campbell – producer (track 14)
- Jason Schweitzer – recording, mixing
- Larry Legend – engineering
- Richard Reitz – engineering assistant
- Willie Breeding – engineering assistant
- Katia Lewin – additional production assistant
- Sandra Campbell – project coordination (track 14)
- Sean Cooper – sound designer (track 14)
- Chris Athens – mastering
- Keith Matthew Boxley – executive producer
- Liz Colabraro – coordinator, management
- Paul Grosso – creative director
- Andrew Kelley – art direction & design
- Devin DeHaven – photography
- Mark "Mister Cartoon" Machado – logo artwork
- Alyson Abbagnaro – A&R

== Charts ==
Chart (2006)	Peak position
Swiss Albums (Schweizer Hitparade)	74
US Billboard 200	50
US Top R&B/Hip-Hop Albums (Billboard)	13
US Independent Albums (Billboard)	3
