= Tredici Pietro =

Italian rapper and singer-songwriter (born 1997)

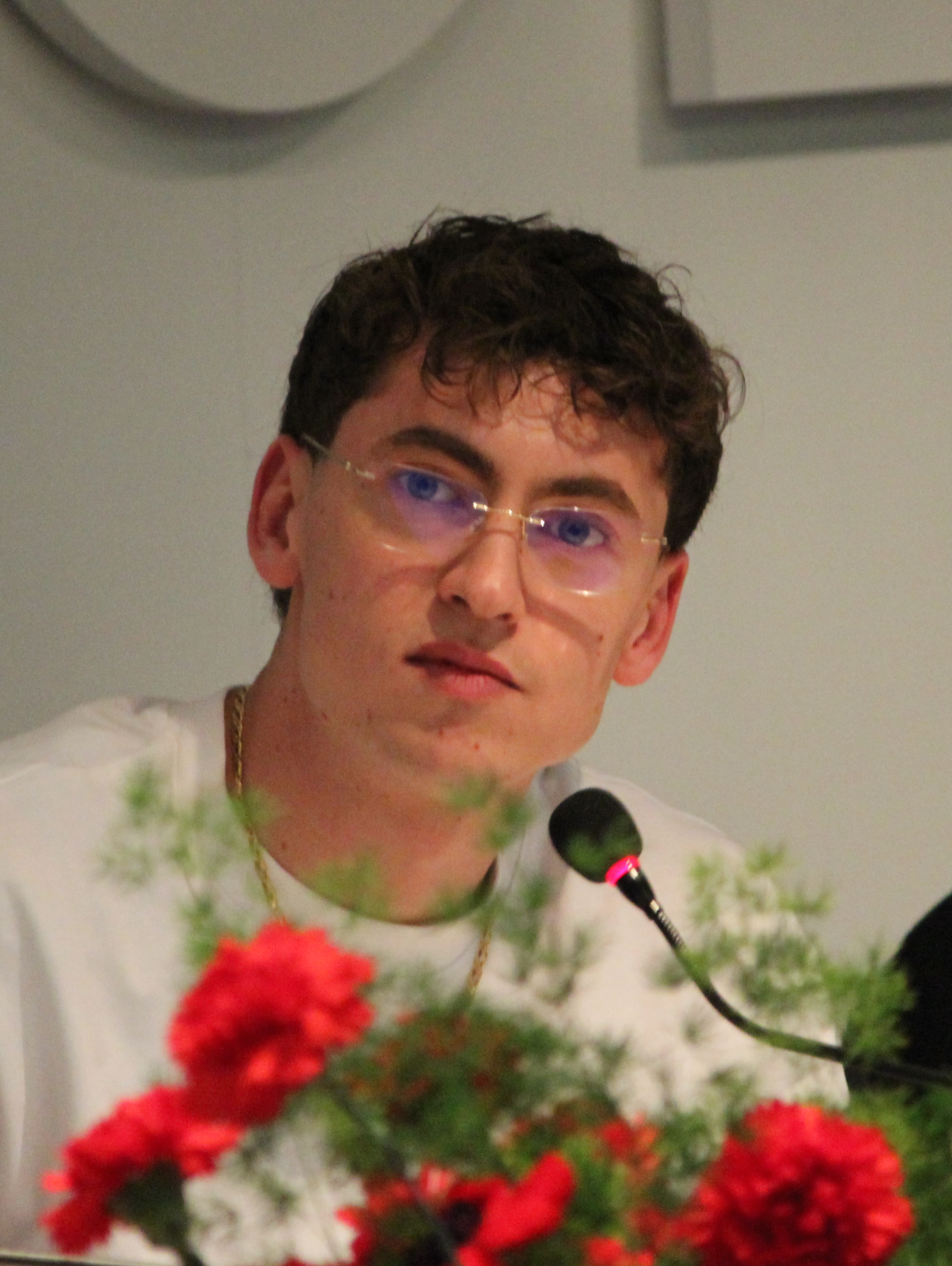
- Tredici Pietro in February 2026

Background information
- Born: Pietro Morandi; 9 August 1997 (age 29); Bologna, Emilia-Romagna, Italy
- Genres: Pop rap; urban; trap
- Occupations: Rapper; singer-songwriter
- Instrument: Vocals
- Years active: 2018–present
- Labels: Universal; Sony Music; Epic; Warner Music Italy

Pietro Morandi (born 9 August 1997), known professionally as Tredici Pietro (Italian: [ˈtreːditʃi ˈpjɛːtro]), is an Italian rapper and singer-songwriter.

== Early life and education ==
Pietro is the son of Gianni Morandi and his second wife Anna Dan; on his father's side, he has two half-siblings, actress Marianna Morandi and singer Marco Morandi. From an early age, he was drawn to music, particularly rap, and began writing his first songs in middle school. He attended the "Marco Minghetti" classical high school in Bologna.

== Career ==
=== 2018–2019: recording debut and Assurdo ===
In Bologna, Pietro met record producer Mr. Monkey, with whom he developed a friendship and musical collaboration. On 15 June 2018, his first single, "Pizza e fichi", was released, achieving good commercial success, albeit with some controversy. Subsequent singles, "Piccolo Pietro", "Rick e Morty" and "Passaporto", all produced by Mr. Monkey, were released.

On 7 June 2019, Assurdo, Pietro's first EP, accompanied by instrumentals by Mr. Monkey, was released. It contains seven tracks and the only featuring track is Farabutto with Madame.

On 26 September 2019, Pietro collaborated with Lil Busso on the track "1€ / secondo," later included on Lil Busso's album "Ipermetromondo". On January 9, 2020, he released the single "Vecchio d'odio" with Psicologi, produced by Mr. Monkey. He collaborated with the duo again in June for Psicologi's first official album, "Millennium Bug," on which he appears on the track "Funerale".

=== 2020–2022: the second EP and the album Solito posto, soliti guai ===
On 29 July 2020, Pietro posted "Sospesi-01" on YouTube, announcing his return and teasing the release of new singles.

In 2021, Pietro ended his collaboration with Mr. Monkey and began one with Andry The Hitmaker. X questa notte, his second EP, was released on 21 April, consisting of seven tracks along with features from Mecna, Nayt and Giaime.

On 22 April 2022, Pietro released his first album, entitled Solito posto, soliti guai, which also contains all the tracks from his previous EP.

=== 2022–2024: Lovesick with Lil Busso ===
On 15 July 2022, the single Guardami le spalle, produced by DJ 2P and Adma, was released; on 28 October with rapper Lil Busso, Pietro released the single "Why U Naked?", produced by sedd. The single is the first single from their joint album Lovesick, due out on 2 December. The album also spawned the single "2€ / secondo", produced by Lunar, and features collaborations with Diss Gacha and VillaBanks. The physical edition includes two unreleased songs not included on the digital version, titled "Piccolo segreto" and "Outro".

In 2023, Pietro continued to collaborate with Lil Busso on the singles "Bro + Bro" and "Velenosa". His new single "Big Panorama" was released in May 2024, followed by the single "High" on 5 July.

=== 2025–present: Non guardare giù and Sanremo ===
On 4 April 2025, Pietro's second studio album, Non guardare giù, was released, which included the previously unreleased songs "Morire" and "Verità". On 23 May the single "Che gusto c'è" by Fabri Fibra, on which he collaborated, was released.

On 30 November 2025, Pietro was announced among the participants of the Sanremo Music Festival 2026. He competed with the song "Uomo che cade".

== Discography ==
=== Studio album ===
List of albums, with selected chart positions
Title	Album details	Peak chart positions
Title	Album details	ITA
Solito posto, soliti guai	Released: 22 April 2022; Label: Universal; Format: digital download, streaming	55
Lovesick (with Lil Busso)	Released: 2 December 2022; Label: Epic; Format: CD, digital download, LP, streaming	66
Non guardare giù	Released: 4 April 2024; Label: Epic; Format: CD, digital download, LP, streaming	9

=== Extended play ===
List of EPs and with selected chart positions
Title	EP details	Peak chart positions
Title	EP details	ITA
Assurdo	Released: 7 June 2019; Label: Universal; Format: digital download, streaming	58
X questa notte	Released: 21 April 2021; Label: Warner Music Italy; Format: digital download, streaming	45

=== Singles ===
==== As lead artist ====
List of singles, with chart positions and album name
Title	Year	Peak chart positions	Certifications	Album or EP
Title	Year	ITA	Certifications	Album or EP
"Pizza e fichi"	2018	—		Non-album single
"Piccolo Pietro"	2018	—		Non-album single
"Rick e Morty"	2018	—		Non-album single
"Passaporto"	2019	—		Non-album single
"Tu non sei con noi, bro"	2019	—		Assurdo
"Vestiti d'odio" (with Psicologi)	2020	28	FIMI: Platinum	Non-album single
"Dimmi come fare, lo faccio"	2020	—		Non-album single
"Oro" (featuring Mecna)	2021	—		X questa notte Solito posto, soliti guai
"Come fossi andato via"	2022	—		Solito posto, soliti guai
"Guardami le spalle"	2022	—		Non-album single
"Why U Naked?" (with Lil Busso)	2022	—		Non-album single
"2€ / secondo" (with Lil Busso)	2022	—		Lovesick
"Bro + Bro" (with Lil Busso)	2023	—		Lovesick
"Velenosa" (with Lil Busso)	2023	—		Non-album singles
"Big panorama"	2024	—		Non-album singles
"High"	2024	—		Non-album singles
"Morire"	2025	—		Non guardare giù
"Verità"	2025	—		Non guardare giù
"La fretta"	2025	—		Non guardare + giù
"Uomo che cade"	2026	14		Non guardare + giù
"Qui piangono tutti"	2026	—		Non guardare + giù
"—" denotes singles that did not chart or were not released.

==== As featured artist ====
List of singles, with chart positions and album name
Title	Year	Peak chart positions	Certifications	Album or EP
Title	Year	ITA	Certifications	Album or EP
"Lentiggini" (Fudasca featuring Alfa and Tredici Pietro)	2021	—		Non-album single
"Immagina" (Fudasca featuring Tredici Pietro, Francesca Michielin and Mecna)	2024	—		Non-album single
"Che gusto c'è" (Fabri Fibra featuring Tredici Pietro)	2025	6	FIMI: Gold	Mentre Los Angeles brucia
"—" denotes singles that did not chart or were not released.

=== Collaborations ===
List of singles and album name
Title	Year	Album or EP
"1€ / secondo" (Lil Busso featuring Tredici Pietro)	2019	Ipermetromondo
"Funerale" (Psicologi featuring Tredici Pietro)	2020	Millennium Bug
"Che palle" (Lil Busso featuring Tredici Pietro)	2021	Sbagli di proposito
"Giorni vuoti" (Bnkr44 featuring Tredici Pietro)	2022	Farsi male a noi va bene 2.0

== Filmography ==
Year	Title	Director
2022	Autumn Beat	Antonio Dikele Distefano
