= Stavo pensando a te =

Single by Fabri Fibra

from the album Fenomeno
- Released: 22 September 2017
- Recorded: 2017
- Length: 4:24
- Label: Universal
- Songwriters: Fabrizio Tarducci; Massimiliano Dagani; Mario Marco Gianclaudio Fracchiolla
- Producer: Big Fish

Fabri Fibra singles chronology
"Luna" (2017)	"Stavo pensando a te" (2017)	"Lario RMX" (2018)

Music video
- "Stavo pensando a te" on YouTube

"Stavo pensando a te" (transl. I was thinking about you) is a song by Italian rapper Fabri Fibra released on 22 September 2017 as the third single from his ninth studio album Fenomeno.

A version of the song featuring singer Tiziano Ferro was released on 18 December 2017.

== Music video ==
The music video for "Stavo pensando a te" was released on YouTube on the same day. It was directed by Andrea Giacomini and shot in Los Angeles, US.

== Charts ==
Chart (2018)	Peak position
Italy (FIMI)	7
Italy Airplay (EarOne)	3

== Certifications ==
Region	Certification	Certified units/sales
Italy (FIMI)	3× Platinum	150,000^{‡}
^{‡} Sales+streaming figures based on certification alone.
