= Tranne te =

Single by Fabri Fibra

from the album Controcultura
- Released: 19 November 2010
- Recorded: 2010
- Length: 4:00
- Label: Universal
- Songwriters: Fabri Fibra; Rémi Tobbal; Steve Fraschini; Guillaume Silvestri
- Producers: Medeline; Michele Canova

Fabri Fibra singles chronology
"Vip in Trip" (2010)	"Tranne te" (2010)	"Le donne" (2011)

Music video
- "Tranne te" on YouTube

"Tranne te" (transl. Except you) is a song by Italian rapper Fabri Fibra released on 19 November 2010 as the second single from his sixth studio album Controcultura.

An extended play titled Tranne te (Rap futuristico), which includes five versions of the song, was released on 1 March 2011.

== Track listing ==
Standard edition
No.	Title	Writer(s)	Producer	Length
1.	"Tranne te"	Fabrizio Tarducci; Rémi Tobbal; Steve Fraschini; Guillaume Silvestri	Medeline	4:00

Tranne te (Rap futuristico) EP
No.	Title	Producer	Length
1.	"Tranne te"		4:01
2.	"Tranne te [Extra Remix]" (featuring Marracash and Dargen D'Amico)		3:31
3.	"Tranne te [Except You Remix]" (featuring Soprano and Redman)		3:33
4.	"Tranne te [Psico Remix]"	Michele Canova	4:05
5.	"Tranne te [Psico Remix Instrumental]"	Michele Canova	4:07

== Music video ==
The music video for "Tranne te", directed by Cosimo Alemà, was released on YouTube on 26 November 2010.

A music video for the remix version featuring Dargen D'Amico e Marracash was released on 22 February 2011.

== Charts ==
=== Weekly charts ===
Weekly chart performance for "Tranne te"
Chart (2011)	Peak position
Italy (FIMI)	2
Italy Airplay (EarOne)	31

=== Year-end charts ===
Year-end chart performance for "Tranne te"
Chart (2011)	Position
Italy (FIMI)	10

== Certifications ==
Region	Certification	Certified units/sales
Italy (FIMI)	3× Platinum	90,000^{*}
^{*} Sales figures based on certification alone.
