= Uomo che cade =

Single by Tredici Pietro

from the album Non guardare + giù
- Language: Italian
- Released: 25 February 2026
- Genre: Pop rap; jazz rap
- Length: 3:37
- Label: Epic
- Songwriters: Pietro Morandi; Antonio Di Martino; Marco Spaggiari
- Producer: Vanegas

Tredici Pietro singles chronology
"La fretta" (2025)	"Uomo che cade" (2026)	"Qui piangono tutti" (2026)

"Uomo che cade" (Italian: [ˈwɔːmo ke kˈkaːde]; "Falling man") is a song by Italian rapper Tredici Pietro, released on 25 February 2026 as the second single from the reissue of his second album Non guardare + giù.

The song was presented during Sanremo Music Festival 2026, where it eventually placed 16th.

== Music video ==
The music video for the song was directed by Enrico Maspero; it was released on the same day as the single via Tredici Pietro's YouTube channel.

== Charts ==
Chart (2026)	Peak position
Italy (FIMI)	14
Italy Airplay (EarOne)	35
