= Ex-Otago =

Italian band

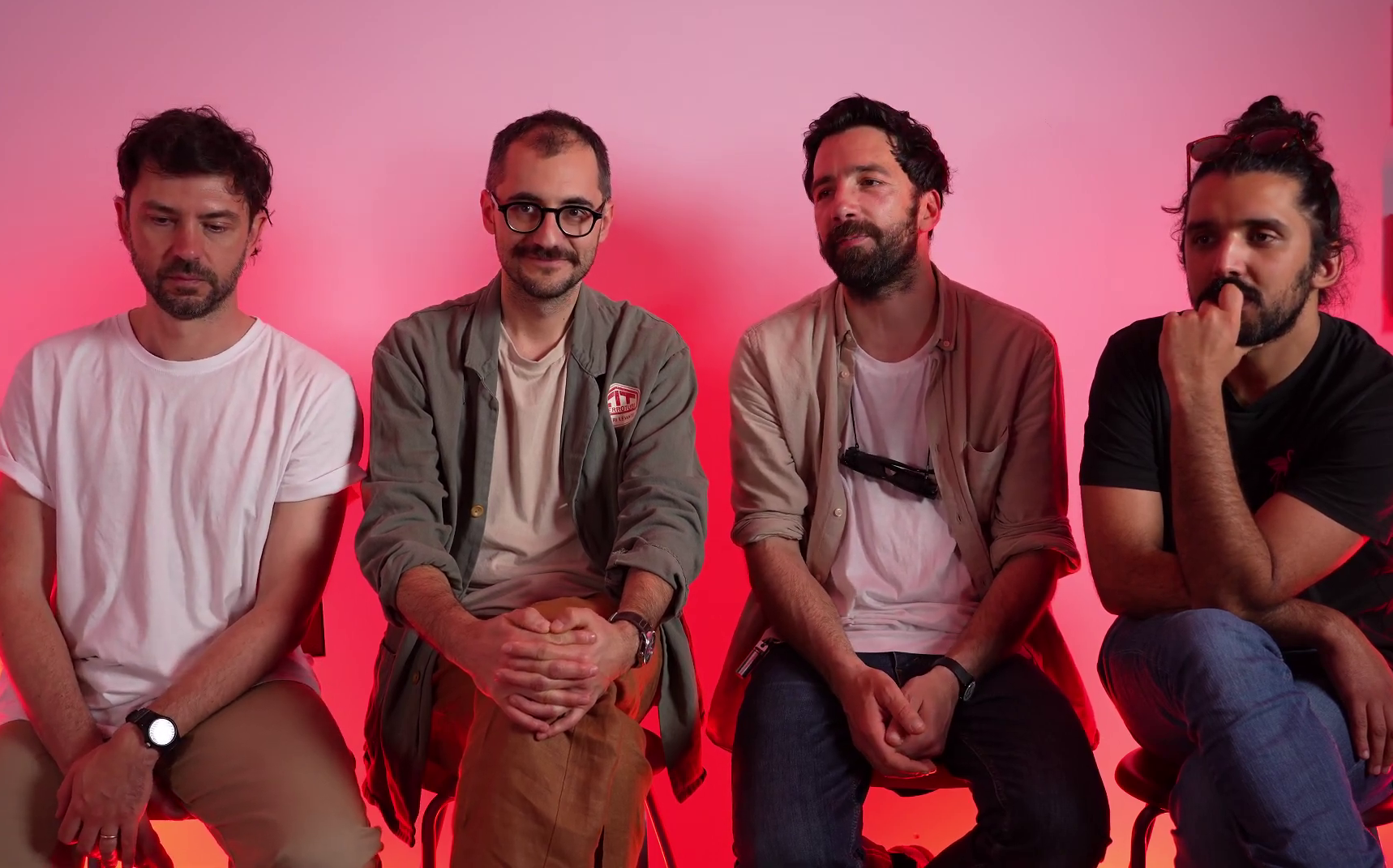
- Ex-Otago in 2024

Background information
- Origin: Genoa, Liguria, Italy
- Genres: Indie pop
- Years active: 2002–present
- Members: Maurizio Carucci (2002–present); Simone Bertuccini (2002–present); Olmo Martellacci (2011–present); Rachid Bouchabla (2016–present); Giorgia Sudati (2024–present)
- Past members: Alberto Argentesi (2002–12); Simone Fallani (2004–08); Gabriele Floris (2008–16); Francesco Bacci (2010–2023)

Ex-Otago is an Italian indie pop band formed in 2002.

They debuted in 2003 with the English album The Chestnuts Time. Their first album in Italian, Tanti saluti, was released in 2007.

The band participated at the Sanremo Music Festival 2019 with the song "Solo una canzone".

== Discography ==
=== Studio albums ===
- The Chestnuts Time (2003)
- Tanti saluti (2007)
- Mezze stagioni (2011)
- In capo al mondo (2014)
- Marassi (2016)
- Corochinato (2019)
- Auguri (2024)
