= Fyre Dept. =

American music production team

Fyre Dept is the production team of Adam Deitch and Eric Krasno.

== Songs ==
Their songs are featured on two of the 2007's biggest records: “My Gun Go Off”, found on 50 Cent’s album Curtis, and “The Nature” by Talib Kweli w/ Justin Timberlake, featured on Talib's album Eardrum. The duo co-produced “The Nature” with Justin Timberlake, who also performs on the track. Eardrum debuted at number 2 on the Billboard charts. The duo also produced multiple tracks on albums by Redman (Red Gone Wild, Def Jam) and Xzibit (Full Circle, Koch).

== Bands ==
Eric Krasno (Soulive) and Adam Deitch (drummer for Wyclef Jean, John Scofield, etc.) combine live instrumentation with modern production techniques. Although Krasno and Deitch both play a variety of instruments, they have put together a crew of New York instrumentalists ranging from classical string players to horn sections. They rarely rely on samples when producing, preferring to use live musicians. Fyre Dept. backed GZA from the Wu-Tang Clan on tour and have also backed the likes of Talib Kweli, Pharoahe Monch, Black Thought, The Beatnuts, Chali 2na, Jean Grae, J-Live, Slick Rick and KRS-One.

== Experience ==
Eric Krasno is a founding member and guitarist of the soul-rock outfit Soulive. Soulive has released records for Velour Music Group, Blue Note and is currently signed to the revived Stax Records label. Krasno has toured nationally and internationally with Soulive, and has opened for the likes of the Rolling Stones and Dave Matthews Band.

Adam Deitch's career has crossed genres, focusing on hip-hop, funk and jazz, playing the role of both drummer and producer. He has carried out session work on drums for artists including Justin Timberlake, Daniel Bedingfield, Anthony Hamilton, DJ Quik and Wyclef Jean and the Fugees. Deitch has toured the world and recorded as a member of the Grammy-nominated John Scofield Band, Lettuce, Pretty Lights, the Average White Band, The Fugees, Wyclef Jean, Me'shell Ndegéocello and his own Adam Deitch Project.
