= Tiromancino =

Italian band

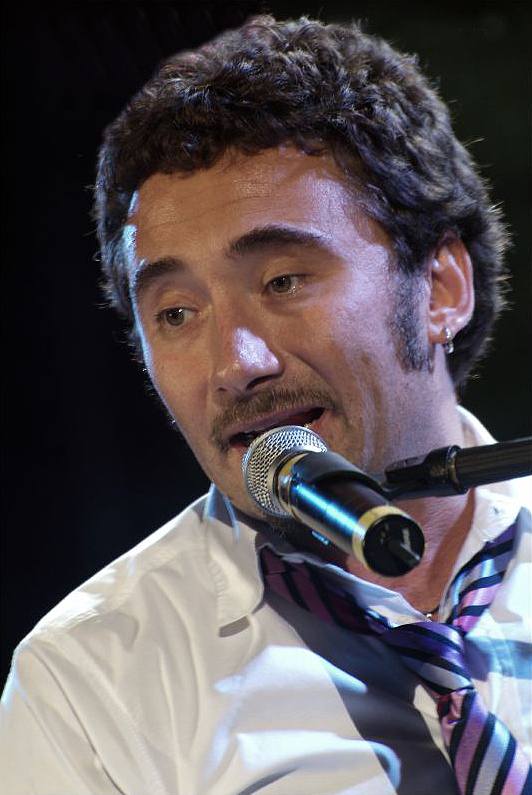
- Federico Zampaglione

Background information
- Origin: Italy
- Genres: Pop; folk; electronica; alternative rock
- Years active: 1989–present
- Members: Federico Zampaglione
- Website: tiromancino.com

Tiromancino is an Italian pop group founded in 1989 by Federico Zampaglione. They have released 14 albums.

Their music is a blend of folk and electronica.

== Discography ==
- 1992 - Tiromancyno
- 1994 - Insisto
- 1995 - Alone Alieno
- 1997 - Rosa spinto
- 2000 - La descrizione di un attimo
- 2002 - In continuo movimento
- 2004 - Illusioni parallele
- 2005 - 95-05 (greatest hits)
- 2007 - L'alba di domani
- 2008 - Il suono dei chilometri (live)
- 2010 - L`Essenziale (recorded in Los Angeles and co-produced by Saverio Principini)
- 2014 - Indagine su un sentimento
- 2016 - Nel respiro del mondo
- 2021 - Ho cambiato tante case
