= Neffa =

Italian singer-songwriter

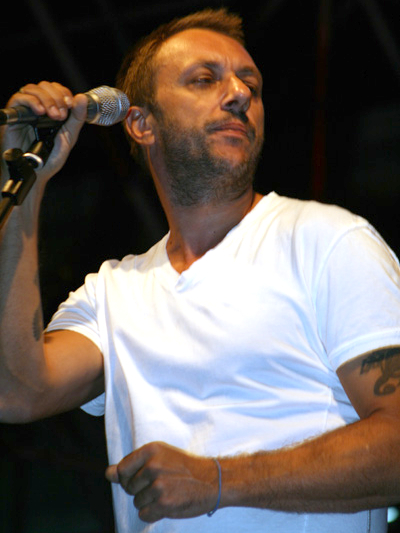
- Neffa in concert (2007)
- Born: Giovanni Pellino; 7 October 1967 (age 59); Scafati, Italy
- Occupations: Singer; songwriter; rapper; record producer

Giovanni Pellino (born 7 October 1967), best known as Neffa, is an Italian singer, songwriter, rapper, and record producer. He is a pioneer of the Italian hip hop scene.

== Life and career ==
Born in Scafati, at a young age Pellino moved to Bologna with his family. In the late 1980s he adopted the stage name Jeff Pellino and was a drummer in several rock and punk bands, notably Negazione. In 1991, he joined the hip hop ensemble Isola Posse All Stars and adopted the stage name "Neffa" in honour of Paraguayan footballer Gustavo Neffa, at the time playing with U.S. Cremonese.

After the album SXM with the rap group Sangue Misto, in 1996 Neffa started his solo career, with the successful album I messaggeri della dopa which was led by the single "Aspettando il sole". In the following albums he spanned various styles including funk, pop, soul, jazz and R&B, achieving major success in 2001 with the summer hit "La mia signorina" and the accompanying album Arrivi e partenze. The same year he was nominated as best Italian act at the MTV Europe Music Awards. In 2004 he entered the main competition at the 54th edition of the Sanremo Music Festival, placing ninth with the song "Le ore piccole".

In 2007 Neffa composed the musical score of Ferzan Özpetek's Saturn in Opposition, for which he won a Globo d'oro for best score and a Nastro d'Argento and a Ciak d'oro for best original song ("Passione"). In 2010 he started the musical project Due di Picche with the rapper J-Ax. In 2016 he returned to compete at the 66th annual Sanremo Music Festival with the song "Sogni e nostalgia".

== Discography ==
- Neffa & i messaggeri della dopa (1996)
- 107 elementi (1998)
- Arrivi e partenze (2001)
- I molteplici mondi di Giovanni, il cantante Neffa (2003)
- Alla fine della notte (2006)
- Sognando contromano (2009)
- Molto calmo (2013)
- Resistenza (2015)
- AmarAmmore (2021)
- Canerandagio (2025)
- Zarathustra Style (2026)
