= Nesli =

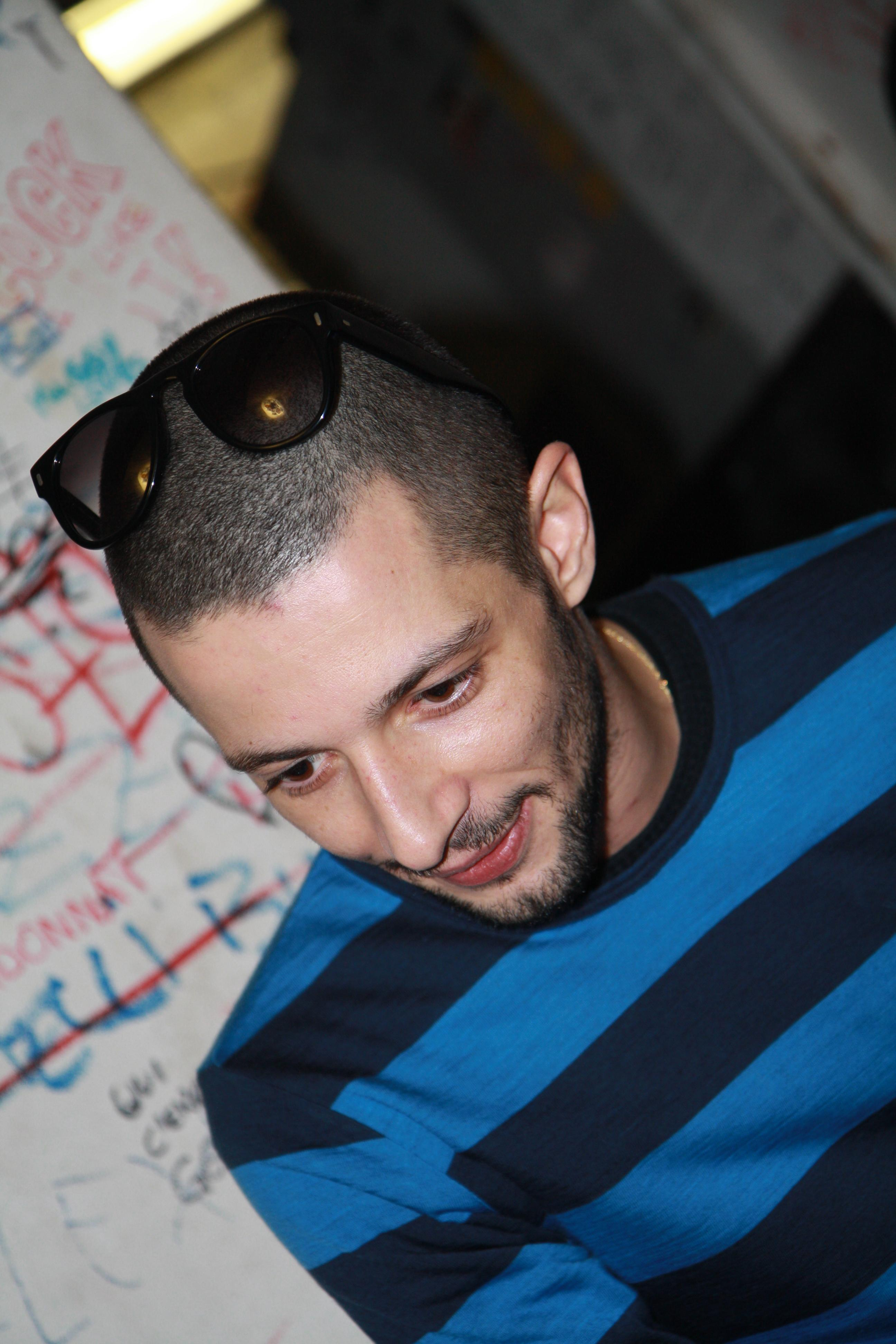

Background information
- Also known as: Nesly Rice
- Born: Francesco Tarducci; 29 December 1980 (age 45); Senigallia, Italy
- Origin: Italy
- Genres: Hip hop; pop rap; R&B
- Occupations: Singer; songwriter; rapper; record producer
- Years active: 1999–present
- Website: www.nesli.it

Francesco Tarducci (born 29 December 1980), better known as Nesly Rice or Nesli, is an Italian singer, songwriter, rapper, and record producer. He is the younger brother of Italian rapper Fabri Fibra.

Nesli released his first demo, Fitte Da Latte, in 1999 with the help of his brother Fabri Fibra.

Tiziano Ferro sang a rendition of "La fine", a song from Nesli's 2009 album Fragile - Nesliving Vol.2, on his 2011 studio album L'amore è una cosa semplice. In 2021, during the third evening of the 71st edition of the Sanremo Music Festival, Fasma sang "La fine" in duet with Nesli. Two years later, during the fourth evening of the 73rd edition of the Sanremo Festival, Lazza sang his own version of the song in duet with Emma Marrone and with the accompaniment of the violinist Laura Marzadori.

== Discography ==
=== Demo ===
- Fitte Da Latte (1999)

=== Solo albums ===
- Ego (2003)
- Home (2004)
- Le verità nascoste (2007)
- Nesliving Vol.1 (2009)
- Fragile - Nesliving Vol.2 (2009)
- L'amore è qui (2010)
- Nesliving Vol.3 - Voglio (2012)
- Andrà tutto bene (2015)
- Kill Karma (2016)
- Vengo in pace (2019)

=== With Piante Grasse ===
- Cactus (2001)
