= Parole dette male =

Single by Giorgia

from the album Blu¹
- Language: Italian
- Released: 9 February 2023
- Recorded: 2022
- Genre: Pop soul; R&B
- Length: 3:06
- Label: Sony Music
- Songwriters: Alberto Bianco; Francesco Roccati; Massimiliano Dagani; Mario Marco Gianclaudio Fracchiolla
- Producers: Big Fish; Rhade

Giorgia singles chronology
"Normale" (2022)	"Parole dette male" (2023)	"Senza confine" (2023)

Music video
- "Parole dette male" on YouTube

"Parole dette male" is a song recorded by Italian singer Giorgia. The song was released on 9 February 2023 as the second single from her eleventh studio album Blu¹ through Sony Music.

The song competed during the Sanremo Music Festival 2023, marking the singer's fifth participant in the contest, the first since her second place with "Di sole e d'azzurro" at the 2001 festival, the song placed sixth in the final ranking.

== Background and composition ==
The song was written by Alberto Bianco, Francesco Roccati, Massimiliano Dagani and Mario Marco Gianclaudio Fracchiolla, and produced by Big Fish and Rhade. At the Sanremo festival press conference, Giorgia described the meaning of the song, as the untethering of her memory of former partner Alex Baroni, who died in 2002:

"The text starts off straight. I turn to a him: do you see him as you are? Give up. In general, we have to accept that we are behind in Italy because we still live in a patriarchal country. It is a problem for men if the woman makes good money and is successful. Women like that have a hard time finding an egalitarian relationship; they either take a step back or stand alone. This is the concept behind the expression "We are either saints or whores." The "whores" refers not only to the sexual sphere indeed but to women who are not accepted because they are too free"

During the conference, the singer also spoke about her decision to return to the Festival after 22 years:

"I thought that I had already given, that I had done mine and I was no longer thinking about Sanremo: I considered it a closed subject and after so many participations I didn't feel like it. The "fault" is mostly Elisa, when last year she was here [competing with "O forse sei tu"], it made me think about what it could be like to be back in the competition. And so I accepted the invitation of Amadeus, who has a remarkable persuasive ability and also made me think about the act of closeness to the public that represented getting back into the game, even though I still at 50 have never stopped playing. [...] After the years we went through, but also on a personal level because I had to rise from a kind of uncertainty even in creativity. [...] Amadeus made me feel like the Ariston was the ideal place for the moment I'm living in."

== Critical reception ==
"Parole dette male" received positive reviews from music critics in Italy upon its release. Andrea Laffranchi of Corriere della Sera assigned a rating of 6.5 out of 10 to the single, writing that it recounts "the good memories of a story that ended, also, because of words spoken wrongly," finding it musically from the "classic 90s soul." Valentina Colosimo of Vanity Fair also found past sounds in the song, "a Whitney Houston tune with an 80s piano-style Fender keyboard," calling it a "refined" song in which Giorgia "doesn't overdo it, doesn't shout, sings with her usual good taste." Of similar thought is Gianni Sibilla of Rockol, who appreciated its "electric piano and retro beat," designed for the singer's vocals. Gianni Poglio of Panorama wrote that it is a "well-balanced" song, between music and lyrics, and "with an R&B/soul sensibility," resulting in "an accomplished song, not a Sanremo single."

Rolling Stone Italia, concerning the songs presented during the second night of the Sanremo Festival, gave it a score of 5.5 out of 10;[16] according to the site's reviewer Filippo Ferrari, "Parole dette male" would be perfect for "the soundtrack of a comedy in which the protagonists end up in bed after a romantic dinner" but that "many would call it elegant. [...] but even here, in my opinion, perhaps more could have been done." Andrea Conti of Il Fatto Quotidiano believed that the song brings "a new Giorgia," through a "soulful sonority that immediately conquers in the aside," and a lyric that narrates with "a look at the future and the present, the transformation of melancholy into something constructive."

Fabio Fiume of All Music Italia though stressed that the song "deserves a few more listens" to be understood, but "if you're good, it comes out, you can't keep it sedated. Giorgia sings what she wants and she always does it well," assigning a score of 7 out of 10. Gabriele Fazio of Agenzia Giornalistica Italia appreciated that the singer "presents herself as she wants to be and not as everyone expected her to be" through a song "of great value and built with great professionalism, but which in Italy no one wants to hear," since "Giorgia is perhaps the most beautiful voice of Italian pop ever, [...] and the work she is doing with the maestro Big Fish really remarkable."

Mattia Marzi for Il Gazzettino review was less enthusiastic, believing that the song "never takes off" not allowing "the Roman singer's voice to come out at its best." Francesco Prisco of Il Sole 24 Ore also stated that the song "lacks the spark," calling it "a nice ride in the time machine, destination 1990s."

== Music video ==
The video, directed by the singer's partner Emanuel Lo, was released to coincide with the launch of the single on the singer's YouTube channel.

== Charts ==
Chart (2017)	Peak position
Italy (FIMI)	18

== Certifications ==
Certifications for "Parole dette male"
Region	Certification	Certified units/sales
Italy (FIMI)	Gold	50,000^{‡}
^{‡} Sales+streaming figures based on certification alone.
