= Bomboloni (album) =

Compilation album by Gianna Nannini
- Released: 1996
- Genre: Rock
- Label: Polydor

Gianna Nannini chronology
Dispetto (1995)	Bomboloni (1996)	Cuore (1998)

Bomboloni is the second compilation album, and fifteenth album overall, by Gianna Nannini. It was released in 1996 on Polydor Records.

== Production ==
The album consists of 14 hits and 3 new songs produced with Mauro Malavasi. Nannini explained that the songs she chose were "those where I truly left a part of myself" and "those tracks that, at the time of their respective recordings, came out well on the first take, without the need for further adjustments".

== Track listing ==
Bomboloni track listing
No.	Title	Writer(s)	Length
1.	"Bomboloni" (New song)	Gianna Nannini	4:11
2.	"Bello e impossibile" (From the album Profumo)	Nannini, Fabio Pianigiani	4:40
3.	"Fotoromanza" (From the album Puzzle)	Nannini	4:26
4.	"Lamento" (From the album X forza e X amore)	Nannini	4:12
5.	"Sorridi" (From the album Scandalo)	Nannini	3:47
6.	"Scandalo" (From the album Scandalo)	Nannini	3:37
7.	"Profumo" (From the album Profumo)	Nannini	3:51
8.	"America" (From the album Tutto live)	Nannini	4:34
9.	"Hey bionda" (From the album Malafemmina)	Nannini	4:38
10.	"Contaminata" (New song)	Nannini, Mauro Malavasi, Mara Redeghieri	4:59
11.	"Latin Lover" (From the album Latin Lover)	Nannini	4:34
12.	"I maschi" (From the album Maschi e altri)	Nannini, Pianigiani	4:32
13.	"Meravigliosa creatura" (From the album Dispetto)	Nannini, Redeghieri	4:31
14.	"Ottava vita" (From the album Dispetto)	Nannini, Dave Stewart	3:45
15.	"Radio Baccano" (From the album X forza e X amore)	Nannini, Jovanotti, Marco Colombo	5:50
16.	"Avventuriera" (From the album Profumo)	Nannini	3:57
17.	"M'anima" (New song)	Nannini	4:25

Bomboloni – German edition bonus track
No.	Title	Writer(s)	Length
18.	"Un'estate italiana"	Giorgio Moroder, Edoardo Bennato, Nannini, Tom Whitlock	4:09

== Charts ==
Chart (1996)	Peak position
Austria (Ö3 Austria Top 40)	39
Europe (Music & Media)	38
Germany (Media Control)	28
Italy (Musica e dischi)	10
Switzerland (Schweizer Hitparade)	26
