= Feline =

Feline may refer to:

== Zoology ==
- Loosely, Felidae, a member of the cat family, which includes the subfamilies Pantherinae and Felinae (conventionally designated a felid).
  - Following the taxonomic convention, Felinae, the subfamily of Felidae that includes domestic cats and smaller wild cats.
    - Cat, the domesticated feline.

== Music ==
- Feline (band), a late-1990s London-based English rock group.
- Feline (The Stranglers album), 1983.
- Feline (1998 album), the self-titled album by Feline, expanded release of Save Your Face.
- Feline (Ella Eyre album) (2015), the debut studio album by Ella Eyre.
- Feline (song), a song on Delta Goodrem's 2016 album Wings of the Wild.
- "Feline", a song by the Cat Empire

== Comics ==
- Feline (comics), a fictional character from the Malibu comics line.

== See also ==
- FÉLIN, a French infantry combat system
- Félines (disambiguation)
