= Cuore =

Cuore, pronounced [ˈkwɔːre], the Italian-language word for "heart", may refer to:

- CUORE Experiment, a particle physics facility in the Laboratori Nazionali del Gran Sasso in Italy
- Cuore (magazine), a Spanish women's magazine established in 2006
- Cuore (zine), a satirical insert in the Italian communist newspaper l'Unità 1989–1997
- Daihatsu Cuore, a vehicle built by the Japanese car maker Daihatsu
- Heart (1948 film), an Italian drama film directed by Vittorio De Sica and Duilio Coletti
- Heart (novel), an 1886 children's novel by Edmondo De Amicis
  - 3000 Leagues in Search of Mother, a Japanese animated television series and film based on the above novel
- Cuore (album), a 1998 album by Gianna Nannini
