= List of number-one hits of 2006 (Italy) =

This is a list of the number-one hits of 2006 on FIMI's Italian Singles and Albums Charts.

Week	Issue date	Song	Artist	Album	Artist
1	6 January	"Hung Up"	Madonna	Buoni o cattivi live Anthology 04.05	Vasco Rossi
2	13 January	"Hung Up"	Madonna	In direzione ostinata e contraria	Fabrizio De André
3	20 January	"Hung Up"	Madonna	Ovunque proteggi	Vinicio Capossela
4	27 January	"Hung Up"	Madonna	Grazie	Gianna Nannini
5	3 February	"Hung Up"	Madonna	L'arcangelo	Ivano Fossati
6	10 February	"Teach Me Again"	Tina Turner and Elisa	Grazie	Gianna Nannini
7	17 February	"Sorry"	Madonna	Calypsos	Francesco De Gregori
8	24 February	"Sorry"	Madonna	Grazie	Gianna Nannini
9	3 March	"Sorry"	Madonna	On an Island	David Gilmour
10	10 March	"I Belong to You (Il Ritmo della Passione)"	Eros Ramazzotti and Anastacia	On an Island	David Gilmour
11	17 March	"Svegliarsi la mattina"	Zero Assoluto	Both Sides of the Gun	Ben Harper
12	24 March	"Svegliarsi la mattina"	Zero Assoluto	Grazie	Gianna Nannini
13	31 March	"Sei nell'anima"	Gianna Nannini	Grazie	Gianna Nannini
14	7 April	"Svegliarsi la mattina"	Zero Assoluto	Grazie	Gianna Nannini
15	14 April	"Svegliarsi la mattina"	Zero Assoluto	Grazie	Gianna Nannini
16	21 April	"Svegliarsi la mattina"	Zero Assoluto	We Shall Overcome: The Seeger Sessions	Bruce Springsteen
17	28 April	"Svegliarsi la mattina"	Zero Assoluto	Pearl Jam	Pearl Jam
18	5 May	"Svegliarsi la mattina"	Zero Assoluto	Stadium Arcadium	Red Hot Chili Peppers
19	12 May	"Hips Don't Lie"	Shakira featuring Wyclef Jean	Eva contro Eva	Carmen Consoli
20	19 May	"Hips Don't Lie"	Shakira featuring Wyclef Jean	Stadium Arcadium	Red Hot Chili Peppers
21	26 May	"Stop! Dimentica"	Tiziano Ferro	Tradimento	Fabri Fibra
22	2 June	"Stop! Dimentica"	Tiziano Ferro	Stadium Arcadium	Red Hot Chili Peppers
23	9 June	"Stop! Dimentica"	Tiziano Ferro	Calma apparente	Eros Ramazzotti
24	16 June	"Stop! Dimentica"	Tiziano Ferro	I'm Going to Tell You a Secret	Madonna
25	23 June	"Stop! Dimentica"	Tiziano Ferro	Nessuno è solo	Tiziano Ferro
26	30 June	"An Easier Affair"	George Michael	Nessuno è solo	Tiziano Ferro
27	7 July	"Sei parte di me"	Zero Assoluto	Nessuno è solo	Tiziano Ferro
28	14 July	"Siamo una squadra fortissimi"	Checco Zalone	Nessuno è solo	Tiziano Ferro
29	21 July	"Siamo una squadra fortissimi"	Checco Zalone	Nome e cognome	Ligabue
30	28 July	"Siamo una squadra fortissimi"	Checco Zalone	Grazie	Gianna Nannini
31	4 August	"Siamo una squadra fortissimi"	Checco Zalone	Grazie	Gianna Nannini
32	11 August	"Siamo una squadra fortissimi"	Checco Zalone	Grazie	Gianna Nannini
33	18 August	"Sei parte di me"	Zero Assoluto	Grazie	Gianna Nannini
34	25 August	"Sei parte di me"	Zero Assoluto	A Matter of Life and Death	Iron Maiden
35	1 September	"Rudebox"	Robbie Williams	Lover of Life, Singer of Songs	Freddie Mercury
36	8 September	"Sei parte di me"	Zero Assoluto	Lover of Life, Singer of Songs	Freddie Mercury
37	15 September	"Sei parte di me"	Zero Assoluto	Lover of Life, Singer of Songs	Freddie Mercury
38	22 September	"Sei parte di me"	Zero Assoluto	Fly	Zucchero
39	29 September	"Sei parte di me"	Zero Assoluto	Fly	Zucchero
40	6 October	"Sei parte di me"	Zero Assoluto	Fly	Zucchero
41	13 October	"Primo appuntamento"	Gigi D'Alessio	Fly	Zucchero
42	20 October	"Primo appuntamento"	Gigi D'Alessio	Rudebox	Robbie Williams
43	27 October	"Martyr"	Depeche Mode	Made in Italy	Gigi D'Alessio
44	3 November	"Jump"	Madonna	Quelli degli altri tutti qui	Claudio Baglioni
45	10 November	"The Saints Are Coming"	U2 and Green Day	Io canto	Laura Pausini
46	17 November	"The Saints Are Coming"	U2 and Green Day	Io canto	Laura Pausini
47	24 November	"The Saints Are Coming"	U2 and Green Day	Io canto	Laura Pausini
48	1 December	"The Saints Are Coming"	U2 and Green Day	Io canto	Laura Pausini
49	8 December	"The Saints Are Coming"	U2 and Green Day	Io canto	Laura Pausini
50	15 December	"Io canto"	Laura Pausini	Io canto	Laura Pausini
51	22 December	"Io canto"	Laura Pausini	Soundtrack '96-'06	Elisa
52	29 December	"The Saints Are Coming"	U2 and Green Day	Io canto	Laura Pausini

== See also ==
- 2006 in music
- List of number-one hits in Italy
