= Nannini =

Nannini is a surname. Notable people with the surname include:

- Aldo Nannini (1951–1977), Venezuelan motorcycle road racer
- Alessandro Nannini (born 1959), Italian racing driver
- Andrea Nannini (1944–2021), Italian volleyball player
- Gianna Nannini (born 1954), Italian singer-songwriter
- Orlando Nannini (born 1937), Argentine fencer

== See also ==
- ;Gianna Nannini (album), the first album released by Gianna Nannini, in 1976
