= Perle (album) =

Studio album by Gianna Nannini
- Released: 2004
- Genre: Rock
- Label: The-Berlin (SPV)
- Producer: Christian Lohr, Gianna Nannini

Gianna Nannini chronology
Aria (2002)	Perle (2004)	Grazie (2006)

Perle is the eighteenth album by Italian rock singer Gianna Nannini, released in 2004. It reached number 6 on the Italian album chart and number 22 on the album chart in Switzerland.

== Track listing ==
1. "Notti senza cuore" (Gianna Nannini) – 4:14
2. "Ragazzo dell'Europa" (Gianna Nannini) – 4:27
3. "Contaminata" (Gianna Nannini/M. Malavasi, Gianna Nannini/M. Redeghieri) – 4:49
4. "Amandoti" (M. Zamboni, G.L. Ferretti) – 4:04
5. "Profumo" (Gianna Nannini/F. Pianigiani, Gianna Nannini) – 3:37
6. "I maschi" (Gianna Nannini/F. Pianigiani, Gianna Nannini) – 4:00
7. "Aria" (Gianna Nannini/F. Sartori, Gianna Nannini/I. Santacroce) – 3:49
8. "Una luce" (Gianna Nannini) – 3:17
9. "California" (Gianna Nannini) – 2:43
10. "Latin Lover" (Gianna Nannini/M. Paoluzzi, Gianna Nannini) – 4:07
11. "Meravigliosa creatura" (Gianna Nannini, Gianna Nannini/M. Redeghieri) – 3:07
12. "Amore cannibale" (Gianna Nannini/R. Gulisano/T. Marletta/D. Oliveri, I. Santacroce) – 5:46
13. "Oh marinaio" (Gianna Nannini) – 3:48

== Personnel ==
- Vocals – Gianna Nannini
- Production – Christian Lohr & Gianna Nannini
- Executive producer – Peter Zumsteg
- Recording engineers – Charly Bohaimid & Christian Lohr
- Mixing engineers – Charly Bohaimid & Christian Lohr
- Mastering engineer – Tony Cousins

== Charts ==
Chart (2004)	Position
German Albums (Offizielle Top 100)	56
Italian Albums (FIMI)	4
Swiss Albums (Schweizer Hitparade)	22
