= Giannissima =

Live album by Gianna Nannini
- Released: 1991
- Genre: Rock
- Label: Metronome

Gianna Nannini chronology
Scandalo (1990)	Giannissima (1991)	X forza e X amore (1993)

Giannissima is Gianna Nannini's second live album and twelfth album overall. It was released in 1991.

== Overview ==
The album was recorded during two concerts of Nannini's Scandalo Tour, held on 7 December 1990 in Cologne and on 14 December 1990 in Milan. The album was also released in VHS, with the 90 minutes video version including additional six songs.

== Track listing ==
Giannissima track listing
No.	Title	Writer(s)	Length
1.	"Intro"	Gianna Nannini	1:30
2.	"I maschi"	Nannini, Fabio Pianigiani	5:49
3.	"Primadonna"	Nannini	4:12
4.	"Profumo"	Nannini	3:45
5.	"Sorridi"	Nannini	3:41
6.	"Bello e impossibile"	Nannini, Pianigiani	3:45
7.	"Dea"	Nannini	3:09
8.	"E-Ya-Po E-Ya-Po"	Nannini, Marco Colombo	7:56
9.	"Avventuriera"	Nannini	3:52
10.	"America"	Nannini	5:04
11.	"Scandalo"	Nannini	3:30
12.	"Latin Lover"	Nannini	5:40
13.	"Io e Bobby McGee"	Kris Kristofferson, Fred Foster, Nannini	4:05
14.	"Terra straniera"	Nannini	4:33
15.	"Outro"	Nannini	1:51

== Charts ==
Chart (1991)	Peak position
Austria (Ö3 Austria Top 40)	36
Europe (Music & Media)	44
Germany (Media Control)	31
Italy (Musica e dischi)	8
Switzerland (Schweizer Hitparade)	20

== Personnel ==
- Gianna Nannini - vocals, piano, guitar
- Hans Baar - bass guitar
- Rüdiger Braune - drums
- Franco Faraldo - percussion
- Chris Jarrett - guitar
- Andy Wright - keyboards
