= House cat (disambiguation) =

House cat or Housecat may refer to:

- Domestic house cat, the small, typically furry, mammal kept as a pet
- Feral cat, a domestic cat that has returned to the wild
- Felix da Housecat (born 1971), an American DJ and house music producer
  - A Bugged Out Mix a Felix da Housecat album
- Housecat Housecall, a reality television series hosted by veterinarian Dr. Katrina Warren

== See also ==
- Cat (disambiguation)
- Feline (disambiguation)
- Stray Cats (disambiguation)
