= X forza e X amore =

Studio album by Gianna Nannini
- Released: 1993
- Genre: Rock
- Label: Polydor
- Producer: David M. Allen, Gianna Nannini

Gianna Nannini chronology
Giannissima (1991)	X forza e X amore (1993)	Dispetto (1995)

X forza e X amore is Gianna Nannini's tenth studio album and thirteenth album overall. It was released in 1993 on Polydor Records.

== Production ==
The album had as working title Maremma. The title X forza e X amore got inspiration from a hymn of the Palio di Siena. Nannini described the album as a development of the previous studio album Scandalo.

== Release ==
Anticipated by the single "Radio Baccano", a duet with Jovanotti, the album was released on 26 May 1993.

== Reception ==
La Repubblica's music critic Gino Castaldo described the album as a work in which Nannini is "divided between two sharply contrasting souls, one intimate, suffering, capable of producing good songs, and another extrovert, public, vaguely 'committed' that on the contrary struggles to break out of the most predictable stereotypes".

== Track listing ==
X forza e X amore track listing
No.	Title	Writer(s)	Length
1.	"Radio Baccano"	Gianna Nannini, Jovanotti, Marco Colombo	6:14
2.	"Io senza te"	Nannini, Fabio Pianigiani	4:20
3.	"Bell'amica"	Nannini, Pianigiani	3:35
4.	"Tira tira"	Nannini	3:58
5.	"Principe azzurro"	Nannini, Marcello Pieri	4:02
6.	"Per forza e per amore"	Nannini	4:41
7.	"Oh marinaio"	Nannini	3:30
8.	"Maremma"	traditional	3:28
9.	"Lamento"	Nannini, Colombo	4:19
10.	"Giramore"	Nannini, Pianigiani	4:25
11.	"Ninna nanna"	Nannini	3:36

== Charts ==
Chart (1993)	Peak position
Austria (Ö3 Austria Top 40)	39
Europe (Music & Media)	59
Germany (Media Control)	51
Italy (Musica e dischi)	7
Switzerland (Schweizer Hitparade)	22

== Personnel ==
- Gianna Nannini - vocals
- Production - David M. Allen, Gianna Nannini
