= Io e Te =

Io e te

Studio album by Gianna Nannini
- Released: 11 January 2011
- Genre: Rock, pop
- Length: 46:14
- Label: Sony Music
- Producer: Will Malone, Gianna Nannini

Gianna Nannini chronology
GiannaDream - Solo i sogni sono veri (2007)	Io e te (2011)	Inno (2013)

Io e te is the twenty-second album by Gianna Nannini, released on 11 January 2011.

== Track listing ==
No.	Title	Writer(s)	Length
1.	"Ogni tanto"	Gianna Nannini, Pacifico	3:29
2.	"Ti voglio tanto bene"	Nannini, Isabella Santacroce	3:22
3.	"I Wanna Die 4 U"	Nannini, Pacifico	3:45
4.	"Dimentica"	Nannini, Pacifico	3:45
5.	"Perché"	Nannini, Davide Tagliapietra, Santacroce	3:49
6.	"Perfetto"	Gianna Nannini, Santacroce	3:20
7.	"Rock 2"	Nannini, Pacifico	4:06
8.	"Mi ami"	Nannini, Santacroce	3:56
9.	"Io e te"	Nannini, Francesco Sartori, Santacroce	3:46
10.	"Com'era"	Nannini, Santacroce	3:54
11.	"Scusa"	Nannini, Santacroce	2:42
12.	"Nel blu dipinto di blu (Volare)"	Domenico Modugno, Franco Migliacci	4:18

== Personnel ==
- Gianna Nannini – vocals, violin, guitar
- Wil Malone – strings, piano, synthesizer
- Thomas Lang - drums
- Francis Hylton - bass
- Miles Bould - percussions
- Davide Tagliapietra - guitars
- Giorgio Mastrocola - guitar (on "Scusa")
- Davide Tagliapietra – guitar
- Production: Wil Malone and Gianna Nannini
- Recording engineers: Mo Hausler, Raffaele Stefani
- Mixing: Pino Pischetola, Cenzo Townshend
- Mastering: Tony Cousin at Metropolis Studios, London
- Photography - Steven Sebring
- Art direction and design: Alberto Bettinetti

== Weekly charts ==
Chart (2011)	Peak Position
Austrian Albums Chart	28
Italian Albums Chart	1
Swiss Albums Chart	4

=== Year-end charts ===
Chart (2011)	Position
Italian Albums Chart	6
Swiss Albums Chart	83
Chart (2012)	Position
Italian Albums Chart	82

== Certifications ==
Region	Certification	Certified units/sales
Italy (FIMI)	4× Platinum	240,000^{*}
^{*} Sales figures based on certification alone.
