= Maschi e altri =

Compilation album by Gianna Nannini
- Released: 1987
- Genre: Rock
- Producer: Armand Volker, Michelangelo Romano, Roberto Cacciapaglia, Conny Plank, Gianna Nannini

Gianna Nannini chronology
Profumo (1986)	Maschi e altri (1987)	Malafemmina (1988)

Maschi e altri was the ninth album by Gianna Nannini. It was her first compilation album, and was released in 1987 in South America, South Korea, Israel, South Africa and Australia. It includes some of her most successful singles, including "Profumo" (which topped the Greek charts), "I maschi" (which debuted at the World Popular Song Festival in Tokyo) and "Avventuriera" (which became popular when Philips used it for a commercial advertising Metalalkaline batteries).
Nannini did not tour to promote the album but she took part in a concert at the Schauspielhaus in Hamburg on May 1, 1987, where she performed a selection of songs by Bertoldt Brecht and Kurt Weill alongside Sting and Jack Bruce. The album was a commercial success, becoming her first album to sell over a million copies in Europe alone.

== Track listing ==
1. "I maschi"
2. "Profumo" (Nannini-Pianigiani/Nannini) - 3:50
3. "America" (Gianna Nannini) – 4:20
4. "Ragazzo dell'Europa" (Gianna Nannini) – 3:34
5. "Avventuriera" (Nannini-Pianigiani/Nannini-Riva) – 4:04
6. "Bello e impossibile" (Nannini-Pianigiani/Nannini) – 4:40
7. "Bla Bla"
8. "Vieni ragazzo" (Gianna Nannini-Parole / Gianna Nannini)
9. "Latin Lover" (Gianna Nannini - M. Paoluzzi/Gianna Nannini) - 4:35
10. "Fotoromanza" (Gianna Nannini - C. Blank/Gianna Nannini - R. Riva) – 4:27

== Charts ==
Chart (1987–1988)	Peak position
Austria (Ö3 Austria Top 40)	11
Germany (Media Control)	25
Italy (Musica e dischi)	5
Sweden (Sverigetopplistan)	3
Switzerland (Schweizer Hitparade)	27
