= David M. Allen =

British record producer (born 1953)

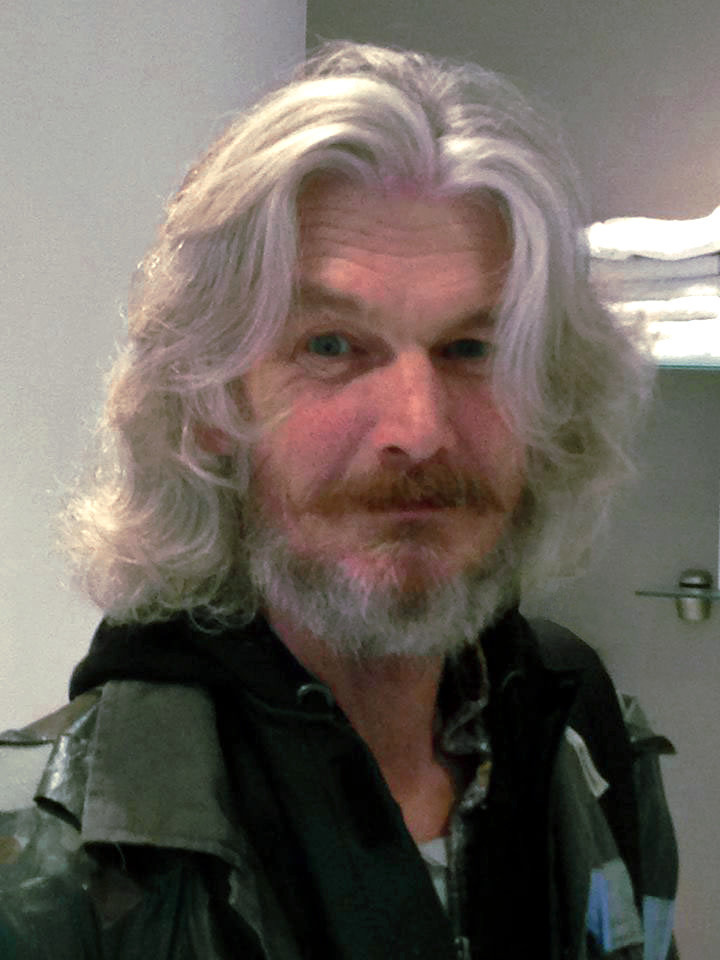

Background information
- Born: 29 June 1953 (age 72); Twickenham, Middlesex, England
- Genres: Rock; gothic rock; new wave; electronic; synth-pop; neo-classical
- Occupation: Record producer
- Years active: 1976–present

David M. Allen (born 29 June 1953) is an English record producer, engineer and mixer. He is mostly known for his work with new wave, synth-pop and goth rock bands including the Cure, the Sisters of Mercy, the Chameleons, Depeche Mode, the Mission, the Associates, the Human League, Clan of Xymox, Gianna Nannini, Shelleyan Orphan and others. He also produced Neneh Cherry's hit album Man.

He created Blank Multimedia in 1994, which operated from the home of XFM from 1995 to 1997, designed websites for Chrysalis and Rough Trade Records, and made an interactive cross-platform CD+ featuring The Plunge Club with music from Andy M. Wright. Blank also organised a 24-hour Internet art gallery, groundbreaking for the era.

In 2022, for Record Store Day UK, he released a vinyl album, DNA of DMA on the Themsay label. This is an historical artefact from 1980 consisting mainly of solo written and produced tracks. These tracks led to a position of programmer and engineer at Genetic Studios in early 1981. This vinyl album was made record of the week by JunoDaily.

== Production discography (selection) ==
=== Studio albums ===
- The Members – Going West
- The Cure – The Top
- The Cure – Concert
- The Cure – The Head on the Door
- The Cure – Kiss Me Kiss Me Kiss Me
- The Cure – Disintegration
- The Cure – Wish
- 12 Drummers Drumming – Loveless
- The Sisters of Mercy – First and Last and Always
- Richard Strange and The Engine Room – Going Gone
- The Chameleons – Strange Times
- The Chameleons – Why Call It Anything
- The Associates – Waiting for the Love Boat
- Wire – Manscape
- Gianna Nannini – Scandalo
- Stefan Eicher – Combien de Temps
- Stefan Eicher – My Place
- Poems for Laila – La filette triste
- Gianna Nannini – X Forza E X Amore
- Gianna Nannini – Dispetto
- The Damned – Not of This Earth
- Frente – Shape
- Feline – Save Your Face
- Fra Lippo Lippi – Songs
- Neneh Cherry – Man
- The Mission – Aura
- The Mission – The Brightest Light
- David M. Allen – The Genetic Tape
- Sennen – Lost Harmony
- The Psychedelic Furs – Book of Days

=== Live albums ===
- The Cure – Concert
- Gianna Nannini – Giannissima

=== Singles ===
- Dead or Alive – "Misty Circles"
- Depeche Mode – "It's Called a Heart"
- Fra Lippo Lippi – "Shouldn't Have to Be Like That"
- Yassassin – "Pretty Face"
- Yassassin – "Cherry Pie"
- The Cure - "The Caterpillar"
- The Cure - "Inbetween Days"
- The Cure - "Close to Me"
- The Cure - "Why Can't I Be You"
- The Cure - "Catch"
- The Cure - "Just Like Heaven"
- The Cure - "Hot Hot Hot"
- The Cure - "Lullaby"
- The Cure - "Lovesong"
- The Cure - "Fascination Street"
- The Cure - "Pictures of You"
- The Cure - "Never Enough"
- The Cure - "High"
- The Cure - "A Letter to Elise"
- The Cure - "Friday I'm in Love"

=== Remixes ===
- Depeche Mode – "Route 66"
- Thomas Leer – "Heartbeat"
- The Human League – "Life on Your Own"

== Films ==
- The Cure – The Cure in Orange
- Conny Plank: The Potential of Noise (2017)
