= Grazie =

Studio album by Gianna Nannini
- Released: 2006
- Recorded: April–October 2005 at GNG Musica, Milan
- Genre: Rock
- Label: Polydor
- Producer: Wil Malone; Gianna Nannini

Gianna Nannini chronology
Perle (2007)	Grazie (2006)	Pia - Come la canto io (2007)

Grazie (Thank You) is the nineteenth album by Italian pop singer, Gianna Nannini. It was released in 2006. As of 2006, the album has sold 400,000 copies in Italy.

== Track listing ==
1. "Sei nell'anima" (Gianna Nannini, Gianna Nannini/L. De Crescenzo) - 4:29
2. "Possiamo sempre" (Gianna Nannini/Wil Malone, Gianna Nannini/Isabella Santacroce) - 4:23
3. "L'abbandono" (Gianna Nannini/Wil Malone, Gianna Nannini/Isabella Santacroce) - 4:01
4. "Grazie" (Francesco Sartori/Gianna Nannini, Gianna Nannini/Isabella Santacroce) - 3:31
5. "Le carezze" (Wil Malone, L. De Crescenzo) - 4:10
6. "Babbino caro" (Gianna Nannini) - 4:37
7. "Treno bis" (Gianna Nannini) - 2:56
8. "Io" (Gianna Nannini, Gianna Nannini/Isabella Santacroce) - 4:37
9. "Mi fai incazzare" (Gianna Nannini) - 4:13
10. "Alla fine" (Gianna Nannini) - 4:37

== Charts ==
=== Weekly charts ===
Chart (2006)	Peak position
Germany (Offizielle Deutsche Charts)	32
Italy (FIMI)	1
Switzerland (Schweizer Hitparade)	12

=== Year-end charts ===
Chart (2006)	Position
Italy (FIMI)	2
Chart (2007)	Position
Italy (FIMI)	35

== Personnel ==
- Gianna Nannini – vocals, guitar, choir, drum sound
- Wil Malone – strings, grand piano, choir
- Davide Tagliapietra – guitar
- Rudiger Elze – guitar
- Fausto Mesolella – guitar
- Camilo Sampaolo – guitar
- Hans Maahn – bass
- Lino De Rosa – bass
- Thomas Lang – drums
- Sasha Ring – sound effects, groove
- Francesco Sartori – grand piano
- Ani Martirosyan – grand piano
- I Piccoli Cantori di Milano – choir
- Giulia Santaroni – choir, speaker
- Delay Lama – choir
- Production: Wil Malone and Gianna Nannini
- Sound engineers: Charlie Bohaimid, Philippe Rose
- Vocal engineers: Charlie Bohaimid, Raffaele Stefani
- Mixing: Pino Pischetola
- Mastering: Tony Cousins at Metropolis Studios, London
- Photography - Steven Sebring
- Art direction and design: Alberto Bettinetti
