= The Opposites of Light =

Studio album by Die So Fluid
- Released: 5 May 2014
- Studio: Unit 2 Studios, The Square, Archway & Hollywood
- Genre: Alternative metal
- Length: 72.12
- Label: Vorvolaka Records
- Producer: Die So Fluid

Die So Fluid chronology
The World Is Too Big for One Lifetime (2009)	The Opposites of Light (2014)	One Bullet from Paradise (2018)

Professional ratings
Review scores
Source	Rating
Metal Riot	4.5/5 stars
ReGen Magazine	4/5 stars
Brutal Resonance	7.5/10 stars
Sonic Cathedral	8/10 stars

The Opposites of Light is Die So Fluid's fourth full-length album. It was released in the United Kingdom on 5 May 2014, on Vorvolaka Records.

The album was recorded at a variety of studios, both in London, UK and Hollywood, USA.

The album is split into two distinct sections ‘Shakura’ and ‘Pah’, the Solar and Lunar deities of the matriarchal Pawnee Native Americans.

== Track listing ==
Music by Drew Richards, melody & lyrics by Grog Lisee, except where stated.

SHAKURA
No.	Title	Writer(s)	Length
1.	"Nightmares"	music & lyrics Grog Lisee	4:53
2.	"Comets"		4:16
3.	"Black Blizzard"		4:17
4.	"Anubis"	music Die So Fluid, melody & lyrics Grog Lisee	4:12
5.	"Carnival"		5:01
6.	"You Suffocate We All Suffer"	music & lyrics Drew Richards	5:28
7.	"Crime Scene"	music Die So Fluid, melody & lyrics Grog Lisee	3:08
8.	"Transition"		5:11

PAH
No.	Title	Writer(s)	Length
9.	"The World Opposite"		3:54
10.	"Echo of a Lie"	music & lyrics Grog Lisee	4:20
11.	"Violent Delights"	music & lyrics Grog Lisee	3:14
12.	"Falcons"	music & lyrics Drew Richards	4:45
13.	"Dream Sequence"		5:12
14.	"Landslides"	music & lyrics Grog Lisee	4:25
15.	"The Road to San Sebastian"	music & lyrics Drew Richards	3:57
16.	"Spark"		5:43

== Personnel ==
Die So Fluid

- Grog – vocals, bass
- Drew "Mr Drew" Richards – guitar, string arrangements except 'Violent Delights'
- Al Fletcher – drums

Additional performers

- Samy Bishai - violin, string arrangements on 'Violent Delights'
- Ivan Hussey - cello

Production

- Die So Fluid - producer
- Adie Hardy - engineer
- Ed Woods - mastering
- Shelley Hannan - design & layout
- Tina Korhonen - photography
- Lee Thompson - photography
- David Kenny - photography
