= The World Is Too Big for One Lifetime =

The World Is Too Big For One Lifetime

Studio album by Die So Fluid
- Released: 7 June 2010
- Recorded: 2009
- Studio: Miloco Studios & Beethoven Street Studios
- Genre: Alternative metal
- Length: 47:16
- Label: DR2 / Global Music
- Producer: Mark Williams

Die So Fluid chronology
Not Everybody Gets a Happy Ending (2008)	The World Is Too Big For One Lifetime (2010)	The Opposites Of Light (2014)

Professional ratings
Review scores
Source	Rating
AllMusic	4.5/5 stars
Sputnik Music	4/5 stars
Sound Sphere Magazine	4/5 stars
Femme Metal Webzine	4/5 stars
Sonic Cathedral	8.5/10 stars

The World Is Too Big For One Lifetime is Die So Fluid's third full-length album. It was released in the United Kingdom on 7 June 2010, and in the United States that autumn. The album was released in Germany, Austria, Switzerland, the Netherlands, Belgium, Luxembourg, France, Norway, and Sweden on November 5.

The album was recorded at Assault and Battery and The Square (part of Miloco Studios), and Beethoven Street Studios, London in 2009.

== Track listing ==
Music by Die So Fluid, Lyrics by Grog, except where stated

UK Edition (original release)
No.	Title	Writer(s)	Length
1.	"Figurine"		4:54
2.	"Mercury"		3:42
3.	"Storm"		3:05
4.	"The World Is Too Big For One Lifetime"	Lyrics by Grog and Drew Richards	4:07
5.	"Hearts Are Hollow"		4:51
6.	"Raven"		4:25
7.	"Themis"	Lyrics by Grog and Drew Richards	3:10
8.	"How Vampires Kiss"		3:10
9.	"If Wishes Were Bullets"		3:03
10.	"What A Heart Is For"		4:47
11.	"Sound In Colour"		4:12
12.	"Death Song (Hidden Track)"		3:51

== Personnel ==
Band

- Grog – vocals, bass
- Drew "Mr Drew" Richards – guitar
- Al Fletcher – drums

Additional Performers

- Bronwen Whitaker – violin on "Raven"

Production

- Mark Williams – producer
- Mathew Wiggins – assistant engineer
- Tom Loffman – assistant engineer
- Alan Douches – mastering
- Shelley Hannan – cover design
- Paul Harries – photography

== Singles ==
"Mercury" was released as the first single. Its original release date of 10 May was rescheduled to 7 June to coincide with the album. A music video was also released.

"What A Heart Is For" was the second single. It was released exclusively to MySpace Germany on 27 October 2010. Although it could be viewed from anywhere via a link which the band provided, it was released internationally on November 6 through the band's YouTube and Facebook accounts.
