= Dispetto =

Studio album by Gianna Nannini
- Released: 1995
- Recorded: 1994
- Genre: Rock
- Label: Polydor
- Producer: David M. Allen, Gianna Nannini, Mauro Malavasi, Ingo Krauss

Gianna Nannini chronology
X forza e X amore (1993)	Dispetto (1995)	Bomboloni (1996)

Dispetto is the fourteenth album by Gianna Nannini, released in 1995.

== Production ==
The album features several notable collaborations, including Francesco De Gregori, Dave Stewart from Eurythmics, Balanescu Quartet, Roberto Cacciapaglia, Franco Faraldo from Nuova Compagnia di Canto Popolare, and Mara Redeghieri from Üstmamò.

== Release ==
The album was released on 13 February 1995.

== Reception ==
La Repubblica's music critic Ernesto Assante praised the album, describing it as "Gianna Nannini's best work in recent years" and noting: "Ethnic and popular music, hard and essential rock, melody and tradition, research and technology, come together in this work in a simple and straightforward manner, in a series of songs that, while maintaining a strong and rough approach, are at the same time the result of a careful work of mixing, of fusion, of comparison between different cultures and sounds".

Marinella Venegoni from La Stampa wrote: "It is a cohesive album, built on a convincing blend of melodrama, energetic rock, and ethnic inspiration—three elements that might hardly coexist were it not for her [Nannini] presence at the center of it all".

== Track listing ==
Dispetto track listing
No.	Title	Writer(s)	Length
1.	"Bellatrix"	Gianna Nannini	1:33
2.	"Meravigliosa creatura"	Nannini, Mara Redeghieri	4:32
3.	"Per dispetto"	Nannini, Fabio Pianigiani	4:31
4.	"Non ti voglio"	Nannini	3:27
5.	"Fotografia"	Nannini	4:33
6.	"Piangerò"	Nannini, Pianigiani	5:02
7.	"Ottava vita"	Nannini, Dave Stewart	3:45
8.	"Con te"	Nannini	3:43
9.	"Non c'è pace"	Nannini	5:06
10.	"Ninna nera"	Nannini, Francesco De Gregori	3:52
11.	"Lontano lontano"	Luigi Tenco	4:41
12.	"500 anni"	Nannini	3:59

== Charts ==
Chart (1995)	Peak position
Europe (Music & Media)	45
Germany (Media Control)	44
Italy (Musica e dischi)	5
Switzerland (Schweizer Hitparade)	24

== Personnel ==
- Gianna Nannini - vocals
- Production - David M. Allen, Gianna Nannini, Mauro Malavasi (tracks 2, 3, 7 and 8), Ingo Krauss (tracks 4, 5, 6 and 11)
