= Una radura =

Una radura...

Studio album by Gianna Nannini
- Released: 1977
- Genre: Rock
- Label: Dischi Ricordi
- Producer: Natale Massara, Gianna Nannini, Claudio Fabi

Gianna Nannini chronology
| Gianna Nannini (1976) | Una radura... (1977) | California (1979) |

Una radura is the second album by Gianna Nannini. It was released in 1977, and it features the Premiata Forneria Marconi as guest musicians. Influenced by the jazz rock and progressive music scene in Milan, it has been described as characterized by "a shaggy voice" and a compositional approach that is "still sowing, like the freshly ploughed field on the album cover". Ondarock described it as having "simple yet haunting melodies, at times sparse, and lyrics that are both intense and cerebral, sometimes even recited".

== Track listing ==
All songs by Gianna Nannini except as noted.

1. "Dialogo" - 3:23
2. "Rebecca" - 3:50
3. "Basta" - 3:08
4. "Frenesia" - 3:55
5. "Se" - 4:11
6. "Maria Paola" - 4:19
7. "Siamo Vivi" - 4:06
8. ""Sono Stanco"" - 3:34
9. "Riprendo La Mia Faccia" (Gianna Nannini, Claudio Fabi) - 2:57
10. "Una Radura ..." - 3:23

== Personnel ==
- Gianna Nannini - vocals, harmonica, keyboards, piano, guitar
- Sergio Farina - guitar
- Gigi Cappellotto - bass
- Claudio Fabi - keyboards
- Bob Callero - bass
- Walter Calloni - drums
- Ernesto Verardi - drums
- Tullio De Piscopo - drums
- Roberto Haliffi - percussion
- Claudio Pascoli - sax
- Greg Bloch - violin
- Franco Mussida - guitar, vocals
- Patrick Djivas - bass
- Flavio Premoli - keyboards
- Franz Di Cioccio - drums
