= Isabella Santacroce =

Italian novelist

Isabella Santacroce (born 30 April 1970 in Riccione) is an Italian novelist.

== Biography ==
Isabella Santacroce was born and lives in Riccione. Her literary startup began in the 1990s with her debut novel Fluo, the first book of the trilogy "Trilogia dello spavento" (trilogy of the frightened) (the other two are Destroy and Luminal). Destroy in particular is of interest in Italy, described by Alessandro Baricco as a "book to read, if Enrico Brizzi is talented, there is double talent in the book".

Santacroce was grouped together with the Giovani Cannibali, (young Cannibals) a literary movement developed at the end of the Nineties (representative of that is the volume Gioventù Cannibale (young cannibals) published by Einaudi), formed by Italian young writers. Among them, Tiziano Scarpa, Aldo Nove, Niccolò Ammaniti, Enrico Brizzi, Tommaso Labranca, Tommaso Ottonieri, Luca Ragagnin and others together with Santacroce, give birth in 1997 to a philosophical-literally movement called, il Nevroromanticismo, (the neuralromanticism) which means to express the unquiteness of existence.

In November 1998 Polo Books published Kurt Cobain and Courtney Love. Canzoni maledette, a collection of her translations of the most representative texts and songs regarding the rock band Nirvana and Hole. Her book Luminal, about two young prostitutes on the run from their pimp, was adapted into an award-winning movie directed by Andrea Vecchiato, starring Denis Lavant, and scored by Michael Nyman After the end of the Trilogy of Frighten, Isabella Santacroce continued to work on the language remaining faithful to her own themes. In 2001 she published for Mondadori Lovers. The theme of this book is Love in its various forms: Love of family, love between man and woman, Homosexual love, and unrequited love which inexorably leads to death. The language adopted in the book tries to get as close as possible to writing made of sounds, named by the author a writing for pure feeling.

In 1999 started her collaboration with the Italian singer Gianna Nannini, which produced the album Aria in 2002, the cartoon Momo alla conquista del tempo, where the writer collaborated for texts. She helped with the writing of lyrics for the other Gianna Nannini's CD Grazie, published in 2006.

In January 2004 Revolver, dedicated to Andrea Vecchiato, was published, an intense and violent romance, in which the writer talks about the history of a love not returned between the protagonist Angelica and a thirteen-year-old boy. In this book and in the next one Zoo published in February 2006, Santacroce tries to make the obscures zones of existence come outside into the light, she tells what we usually try to hide. Family is described as an “horrible carnival”, which deserves to be destroyed. 2007 is the year of "V.M.18", romance in which she talks about the totally unruled lives of three 14-year-old girls in a college, this book signs the next change in the narrative style of Santacroce, defined by critics "seventeenhundreds".

== Works ==
- Fluo. Storie di giovani a Riccione (Castelvecchi, 1995; Feltrinelli, 1999)
- Destroy (Feltrinelli, 1996)
- Luminal (Feltrinelli, 1998)
- Lovers (Mondadori, 2001)
- Revolver (Mondadori, 2004)
- Dark Demonia (Mondadori, 2005)
- Zoo (Fazi, 2006)
- V.M.18 (Fazi 2007)
- Lulù Delacroix (Rizzoli 2010)
- Amorino (Bompani 2012)
