= Tommaso Labranca =

Italian writer (1962–2016)

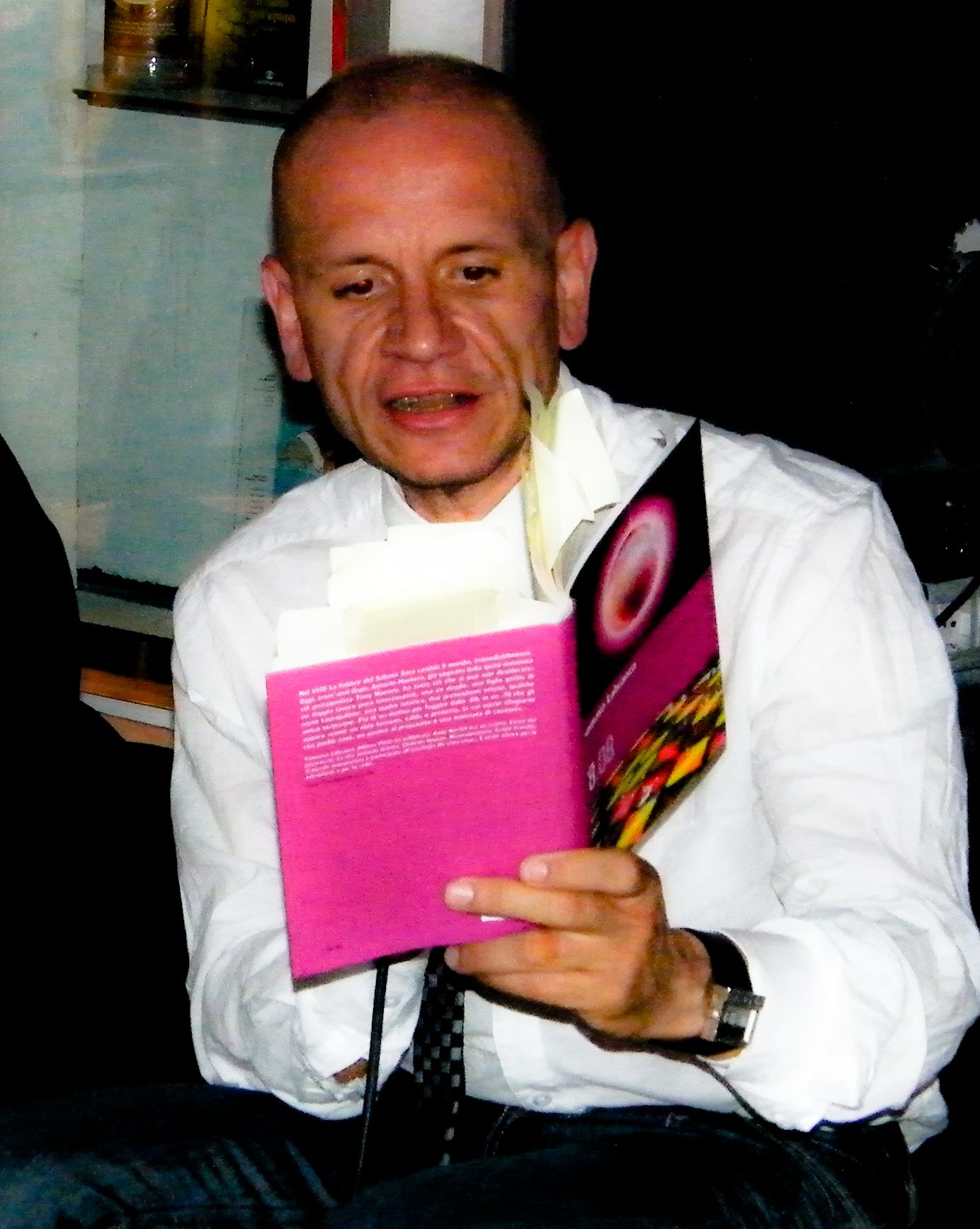
- Labranca in 2008
- Born: 18 February 1962; Milan, Italy
- Died: 29 August 2016 (aged 54); Pantigliate, Italy
- Occupation: Writer

Tommaso Labranca (18 February 1962 – 29 August 2016) was an Italian essayist, novelist, journalist, writer, and radio presenter.

== Life and career ==
Born in Milan, Labranca started his career in the 1980s as a translator and an editor of fanzines. Interested in the Italian trash culture, which he considered as "the last major manifestation of Italian creativity", between 1992 and 1994 he directed the magazine Trashware, and he became first known for the books Andy Warhol era un coatto ("Andy Warhol was tacky", 1994) and Estasi del pecoreccio ("Extasy of the bad taste", 1995). In the 1990s he was part, together with Niccolò Ammaniti, Isabella Santacroce, Tiziano Scarpa and others, of a literary movement known as "i cannibali" ("the cannibals").

In 1997 he debuted as a television writer with the Rai 2 nostalgia show Anima mia, and starting from 2000 he collaborated with several radio stations including Radio Rai and Radio 24 as a writer and a presenter. In 2013 he founded an independent publishing house, 20090. His last work was the essay Vraghinaròda. Viaggio allucinante fra creatori, mediatori e fruitori dell'arte ("Vraghinaròda. Fantastic voyage between creators, users and mediators of art", 2016).

Labranca unexpectedly died of a heart attack at his home in Pantigliate, on the night of 29 August 2016. He was 54 years old.
