= Beautiful Rebel =

2024 Italian film by Cinzia Torrini

- Italian Netflix poster
- Italian: Sei nell'anima
- Directed by: Cinzia Torrini
- Based on: Cazzi miei by Gianna Nannini
- Starring: Letizia Toni; Selene Caramazza; Stefano Rossi Giordani; Teresa Tanini; Maurizio Lombardi; Andrea Delogu
- Production company: Indiana Production
- Distributed by: Netflix
- Release date: 2 May 2024
- Running time: 112 minutes
- Country: Italy
- Language: Italian

Beautiful Rebel (Italian: Sei nell'anima, lit. 'You Are in [My] Soul', titled after Nannini's 2006 hit) is a 2024 Italian biographical film directed by Cinzia Torrini and starring Letizia Toni, based on the autobiography Cazzi miei ('My Damn Business') by Italian rock singer Gianna Nannini. It was released on Netflix on 2 May 2024.

== Cast ==
- Letizia Toni as Gianna Nannini
- Selene Caramazza as Carla Accardi
- Stefano Rossi Giordani as Marc
- Teresa Tanini as Giovanna Cellesi
- Maurizio Lombardi as Danilo Nannini
- Andrea Delogu as Mara Maionchi
- Florin Piersic Jr. as Roger Kranz
- Christian Stamm as Conny Plank
- Angelo Galdi as Mauro Pagani
- Lorenzo Aloi as Alessandro Nannini

== Production ==
Filming took place in and around Nannini's native city of Siena, including Piazza del Campo and Torri, a village in Sovicille.

== Release ==
A teaser trailer for the film was released on 1 February 2024.
