= Spawn of Dysfunction =

Studio album by Die So Fluid
- Released: August 9, 2004
- Recorded: 2003
- Studio: Criterion Studios
- Genre: Alternative metal
- Length: 40:17
- Label: Cartesian Records Ltd
- Producer: Mark Williams

Die So Fluid chronology
Operation Hypocrite (2001)	Spawn of Dysfunction (2004)	Not Everybody Gets a Happy Ending (2008)

Spawn of Dysfunction is the first album by nu metal trio Die So Fluid. It was recorded at Criterion Studios, London, in November 2003 and released through the band's own label, Cartesian Records Ltd, in the United Kingdom in 2004. It was distributed by Cargo Records. The album was not released internationally until 2008. It was distributed by Renaissance Recordings in the USA and Universal Music Germany distributed it to several European countries. When originally purchased in the USA, a sticker on the front of the album said "The First Album from Die So Fluid Expanded U.S. Edition", although it has the same tracks.

== Reception ==
Praising their "big sound", a 2012 review in Femme Metal Webzine said, "The lyrics are angry, the vocals are raw and in your face, as you would expect from this style of band. However, the song writing is quite creative, making this an exceptional album of the genre."

== Track listing ==
Music by Die So Fluid, Lyrics by Grog.

UK Edition (original release)
No.	Title	Length
1.	"Bitterness by Discipline"	5:08
2.	"Spawn of Dysfunction"	4:14
3.	"Circus of Sin"	3:14
4.	"Tripitaka"	4:54
5.	"Kiss the Floor"	3:24
6.	"Disconnected"	4:51
7.	"Brainwash"	2:45
8.	"Draw a Line and Cross It"	4:11
9.	"Suck Me Dry"	3:33
10.	"Chasing Dawn"	4:07

== Personnel ==
Band

- Grog – vocals, bass
- Drew "Mr Drew" Richards – guitar
- Al Fletcher – drums

Production

- Mark Williams - producer
- Eric Broyhill - mastering
- Uncle Vania - illustrations
- Paul Harries - photography
- Hugh (Gilmour Design) - design

== Singles ==
Suck Me Dry (2002)

1. "Suck Me Dry" - 3:43
2. "Twisting the Knife" - 4:19
3. "Sound Will Save Me" - 4:48
4. "Operation Hypocrite (Live) - 3:17

Disconnected (2002)

1. "Disconnected" - 4:51
2. "Beyond Help" - 4:28
3. "Will Is Dead" - 4:43
4. "Disconnected" (Video) - 4:51

Spawn of Dysfunction (2005)

1. "Spawn of Dysfunction" - 4:17
2. "Smear Campaign" - 3:37
3. "Disconnected (Live)" - 4:29
4. "Draw a Line and Cross It (Live) [Not Listed On Back]" - 4:05

Spawn of Dysfunction 10" vinyl (2005)

1. "Spawn of Dysfunction" - 4:17
2. "Smear Campaign" - 3:37
3. "Shiva" - 3:40
