= Operation Hypocrite =

EP by Die So Fluid
- Released: 2001
- Recorded: February 2001
- Genre: Hard rock
- Label: Sanctuary Records

Die So Fluid chronology
Operation Hypocrite (2001)	Spawn of Dysfunction (2003)

Operation Hypocrite is the debut EP by English hard rock band Die So Fluid. The EP was recorded at Gravity Shack, South London in February 2001 and produced by the band. It was released by Sanctuary Records.

== Track listing ==
All tracks are written by Die So Fluid. All lyrics by Grog Prebble.

1. Operation Hypocrite - 3:26
2. Hard Feelings - 3:27
3. Hedonist - 2:51
4. Concealed Machine - 3:24

== Personnel ==
- Georgina 'Grog' Lisee – Vocals & Bass
- Al Fletcher – Drums
- Drew Richards – Guitar

=== Recording details ===
- Engineer – Pat Collier (tracks: 1 to 4)
- Music - Die So Fluid
- Lyrics - Grog Prebble
- Produced – Die So Fluid

== Releases ==
CD, Maxi-Single– RAWCD146

- August 6, 2001
1. Operation Hypocrite - 3:26
2. Hard Feelings - 3:27
3. Hedonist - 2:51
4. Concealed Machine - 3:24
