= Die So Fluid =

British rock band

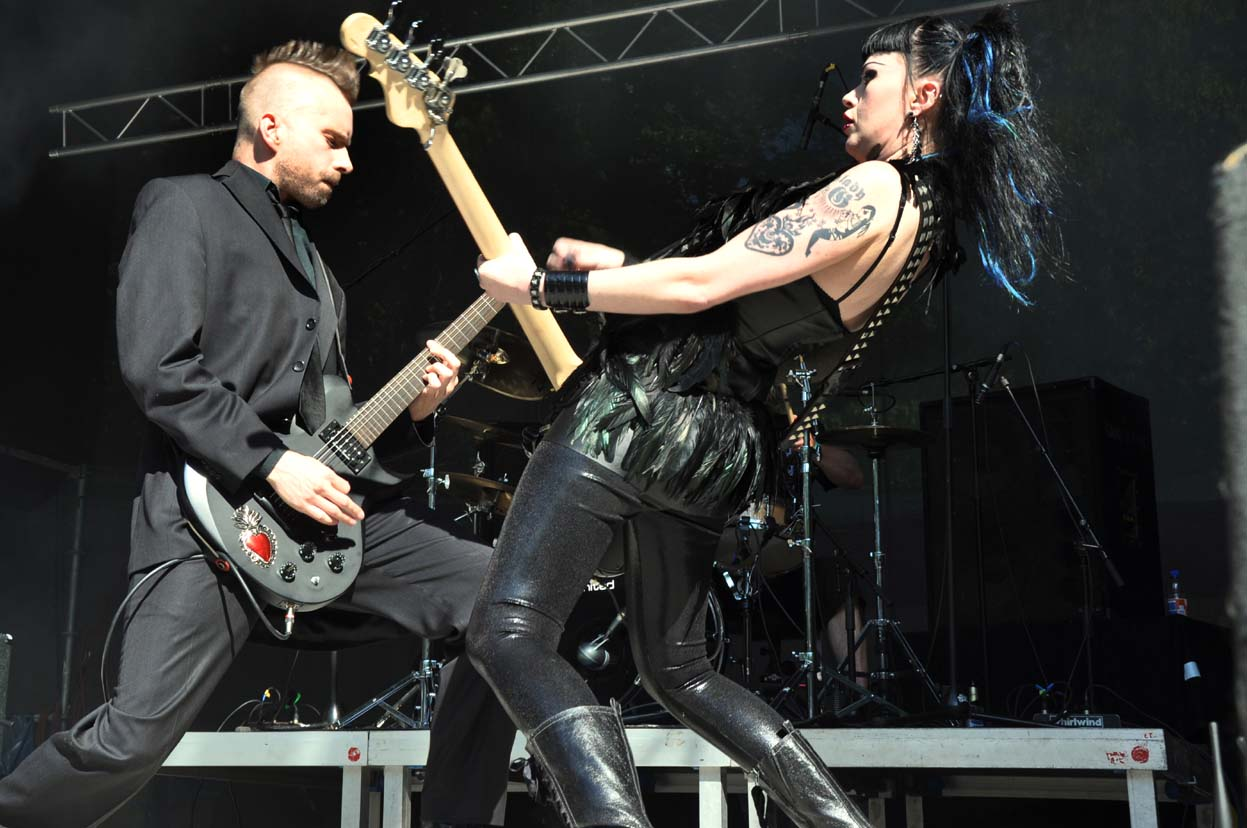
- Die So Fluid live at WGT

Background information
- Origin: London, England
- Genres: Hard rock, alternative metal
- Years active: 2001–present
- Labels: Strataville, Vorvolaka, Parole Hearing
- Members: Grog; Drew Richards; Justin Bennett
- Past members: Al Fletcher
- Website: diesofluid.world

Die So Fluid are an English hard rock band formed in London in 2000. The group consists of three members: songwriter Grog (vocals, bass), Drew Richards (guitar) and Justin Bennett (drums). Al Fletcher played drums and performed backing vocals until his death in 2016. They have released five albums, the first two being Spawn of Dysfunction and Not Everybody Gets a Happy Ending. The third album, The World Is Too Big for One Lifetime, was released in the UK in June 2010. The fourth album, The Opposites of Light, was released on 5 May 2014. Fifth album One Bullet from Paradise was released in August 2017 after a pre-order campaign launched at PledgeMusic . In June 2024 the band announced they would be releasing a sixth studio album entitled Skin Hunger.

== Career ==
=== History ===
Die So Fluid were formed after the disbanding of Feline and Ultraviolet. When EMI dropped Feline in 1999, they went on to form Ultraviolet adding Al Fletcher as the full-time drummer. Ultraviolet released a single and an EP on Sanctuary Records Group and disbanded shortly thereafter.

Drew said, "When we did Ultraviolet it was basically Feline under a different name because we got dropped by the record company and we wanted to do another deal. Then we realised that ploy, that cynical ploy was not going to pay off and we thought, right we want to do the music that we want to do now and that meant kicking out the other guitar player who wasn't really into that sort of music, and making a deliberate decision not to sort of kiss up to anyone in the business anymore and to start doing everything for ourselves."

=== Operation Hypocrite EP, Spawn of Dysfunction (2000–2004) ===
Die So Fluid first surfaced in 2000, touring the United Kingdom after the release of their debut Operation Hypocrite EP, on Raw Power, an imprint of Sanctuary. Die So Fluid released one single on Sanctuary following the EP before forming their own label, Cartesian. Once Cartesian was established, Die So Fluid released one single before releasing their debut album, Spawn of Dysfunction, the following year. The album was well received, and the band toured.

In December 2015, Strata Books published a memoir by Grog Rox and Drew Richards as part of its Debut Series about the making of Spawn of Dysfunction.

=== Not Everybody Gets a Happy Ending (2005–2009) ===
The album Not Everybody Gets a Happy Ending was released on Parole Records in February 2008. Two digital singles were released in support of the album Happy Halloween and Existential Baby. Die So Fluid toured in support of the album.

=== The World Is Too Big for One Lifetime (2010–2011) ===
The World Is Too Big for One Lifetime was released in June 2010 on the Global Music DR2 label.

=== The Opposites of Light (2012–2016) ===
The Opposites of Light was released on 5 May 2014. The release of the album is staggered to coincide with tours in various territories. This is the first album entirely produced by the band. Mixing was divided between Mark Williams and Drew Richards except for one track mixed by Sylvia Massy and Ian Rickard. On 6 November a video for the first track to be released from this album, entitled "Black Blizzard", was released on YouTube.

On 25 July 2016, drummer Al Fletcher died from "double pneumonia followed by sepsis in a rare reaction to an infection".

=== One Bullet from Paradise (2017–2020) ===
The band announced on their website in 2016 that a new album, One Bullet from Paradise, would be released in 2017. They also shared an early version of the song "Born to Kill" from the upcoming album. "Bittersweet", the first single from One Bullet from Paradise was released in 7 April alongside a video.

In August 2017, the band launched a limited edition pre-order of the new album at PledgeMusic, with a preview of new songs "Tomorrow Doesn't Always Come" and "No More Stars". The pre-order also includes a previously unreleased live album Draw A Line And Cross It. One Bullet From Paradise was released on 30 March 2018. Drums were performed by Justin Bennett, a long time friend of Grog's, who also mixed some of the album. This line up played a one-off concert at the Lexington in London on 11 November 2018.

On 10 April 2020, the band released its first new music since One Bullet From Paradise in the form of a single "Do You Dare". This was followed later that year by another single "Walk with Me".

=== Skin Hunger (2024) ===
In June 2024 the band launched an Indiegogo campaign to raise funds to produce and manufacture a new album Skin Hunger. The album was to consist of five of the singles released since One Bullet From Paradise and five new tracks. The campaign hit its funding target in 72 hours and the album is due to be shipped to funders and patrons late August/ early September. Skin Hunger will be released on streaming platforms on 20 September 2024.

=== Californian franchise (2024) ===
In November Grog was playing live shows on the West coast of the US and Canada fronting a U.S. 'franchise' of the band with members of Krashkarma on guitar and drums.

== Band members ==
- Georgina 'Grog' Lisee – bass, lead vocals
- Drew Richards – guitar
- Al Fletcher – drums, backing vocals (deceased)
- Justin Bennett – drums

== Solo projects ==
On 1 January 2006, Drew Richards released his debut album The Mindscape of Alan Moore. An original soundtrack recording of the 2006 feature-length documentary The Mindscape of Alan Moore. "A psychedelic as you likeadelic trip into the brain of Britain's greatest living graphic novel and comics author."

On 22 July 2016, Grog released her debut solo track "In Plain Sight" (Strataville), followed by two further singles, "Guiding Light" and "Prodigal Daughter" (Grog website).

== Discography ==
Studio albums

- Spawn of Dysfunction (2003)
- Not Everybody Gets a Happy Ending (2008)
- The World Is Too Big for One Lifetime (2010)
- The Opposites of Light (2014)
- One Bullet from Paradise (2016)
- Skin Hunger (2024)

EPs

- Operation Hypocrite EP (2001)
- Suck Me Dry EP (2001)
- Disconnected EP (2002)

Singles

- "Spawn of Dysfunction" (2005)
- "Happy Hallowe'en" (2008)
- "Existential Baby" (2008)
- "Mercury" (2010)
- "What a Heart Is For" (2010)
- "Black Blizzard" (2013)
- "Tomorrow Doesn't Always Come" (2018)
- "Do You Dare" (2020)
- "Walk With Me" (2020)
- "The Start or the End" (2021)
- "Horrorscope Heroine" (2022)
- "We Are The Virus" (2023)
- "Sharpen Your Sword" (2023)
- "Dispute" (2024)
