= Cuore (album) =

Studio album by Gianna Nannini
- Released: 1998
- Genre: Rock
- Label: Polydor
- Producer: Fabrizio Barbacci

Gianna Nannini chronology
Bomboloni (1996)	Cuore (1998)	Aria (2002)

Cuore ('Heart') is the twelfth studio album, and sixteenth album overall, by Gianna Nannini. It was released in 1998.

== Track listing ==
Cuore track listing
No.	Title	Writer(s)	Length
1.	"Un giorno disumano"	Gianna Nannini, Vergeat	5:38
2.	"Bacio fondente"	Marco Colombo, Nannini	4:24
3.	"Centomila"	Bruni, Nannini, Vergeat	4:03
4.	"Notti senza cuore"	Nannini	4:58
5.	"Come sei"	Bruni, Nannini, Vergeat	4:23
6.	"Peccato originale"	Nannini	4:54
7.	"Ti spezzo il cuore"	Nannini	3:57
8.	"Stellicidio"	Nannini, Fabio Pianigiani	4:25
9.	"Dimmi dimmelo"	Nannini, Vergeat	3:58
10.	"La strada"	Colombo, Nannini	3:56
11.	"Sola"	Fabrizio Barbacci, Nannini	3:41
12.	"Io ci sarò (Settimo sigillo)"	Nannini, Vergeat	5:07

== Charts ==
Chart (1996)	Peak position
Europe (Music & Media)	66
Italy (FIMI)	9
Switzerland (Schweizer Hitparade)	13

== Personnel ==
- Gianna Nannini - vocals
- Production - Fabrizio Barbacci
