= Sei nell'anima =

Single by Gianna Nannini

from the album Grazie
- Language: Italian
- B-side: "The Train"
- Released: 13 January 2006
- Recorded: 2005
- Genre: Pop rock; rock ballad
- Length: 4:29
- Label: Polydor
- Composer: Gianna Nannini
- Lyricists: Gianna Nannini; Luigi De Crescenzo
- Producer: Wil Malone

Gianna Nannini singles chronology
"Una luce" (2004)	"Sei nell'anima" (2006)	"Io" (2006)

Music video
- "Sei nell'anima" on YouTube

"Sei nell'anima" ("You Are in [My] Soul") is a song by Italian rock singer Gianna Nannini, released on 13 January 2006 as the first single from the album Grazie. Written by Nannini and Pacifico, "Sei nell'anima" marked the start of a long and prolific collaboration between the two. It is one of the singer's most successful tracks, having topped both the national sales and the radio airplay charts, and is considered one of her signature songs. In 2020, it was chosen as the representative song of 2006 by the directors of the main radio stations in Italy, as part of the contest I Love My Radio.

An English-language version of "Sei nell'anima", titled "Hold the Moon", was also included in the album Grazie. The song, in its various versions, has also featured on subsequent compilation albums by Nannini, such as GiannaBest and Hitstory. In 2024, Nannini launched a new album, a tour, an autobiography and a Netflix biopic all titled after the song.

== Music video ==
The music video for "Sei nell'anima" was directed by Kal Karman. It was shot in Bratislava, Slovakia, during winter, and alternates scenes from the daily life of a couple with black-and-white segments featuring Nannini.

== Charts ==
=== Weekly charts ===
Weekly chart performance for "Sei nell'anima"
Chart (2006)	Peak position
Italy (FIMI)	1
Italy Airplay (Music Control)	1

=== Year-end charts ===
Year-end chart performance for "Sei nell'anima"
Chart (2006)	Position
Italy (FIMI)	4

== Certifications ==
Region	Certification	Certified units/sales
Italy (FIMI) Sales from 2009	Platinum	30,000^{*}
^{*} Sales figures based on certification alone.

== See also ==
- List of number-one hits of 2006 (Italy)
