= Profumo (album) =

Studio album by Gianna Nannini
- Released: 1986
- Recorded: Spring 1986
- Studio: Conny's Studio (Neunkichen/Cologne, Germany)
- Genre: Rock
- Label: Polydor
- Producer: Conny Plank, Gianna Nannini

Gianna Nannini chronology
Tutto Live (1985)	Profumo (1986)	Maschi e altri (1987)

Profumo is the eighth album by Gianna Nannini. It was released in 1986.

In the wake of the international acclaim that followed her previous album, "Puzzle", "Profumo" was released throughout Europe, South America, South Africa, Australia, South Korea and Japan, selling over 1,000,000 copies.

== Track listing ==
1. "Bello e impossibile" (Nannini-Pianigiani/Nannini) – 4:40
2. "Profumo" (Nannini-Pianigiani/Nannini) - 3:50
3. "Come una schiava" (Nannini/Nannini-Riva) – 5:11
4. "Gelosia" (Nannini-Plank-Pianigiani/Nannini-Riva) - 3:05
5. "Seduzione" (Nannini-Pianigiani/Nannini-Riva) – 3:29
6. "Quale amore" (Nannini-Pianigiani/Nannini) – 5:08
7. "Avventuriera" (Nannini-Pianigiani/Nannini-Riva) – 4:04
8. "Quante mani" (Nannini-Pianigiani/Nannini-Riva) - 3:31
9. "Terra straniera" (Nannini-Pianigiani/Nannini) - 6:14

== Personnel ==
- Gianna Nannini - Vocals, keyboards, guitars
- Fabio Pianigiani - Guitars, keyboards
- Rolf Lammers - Organ, keyboards
- Rainer Herzog - Keyboards
- Hans Bäär - Bass
- Rüdiger Braune - Drums
- Conny Plank - Percussion, sequencer
- Nikko Weidmann - Bass Synth.
- Martin Doepke - Bass Arr.
- Rudy Spinello - Guitars
- Gino Lattuca - Trumpet
- Rüdiger Baldauf - Trumpet
- George Mayer - Saxophone
- Reto Mandelkow - Alto sax
- Jürgen Hiekel - Tenor sax
- Gina Di Maio - Choir
- Fabiana De Geronimo - Choir
- Gloria Campoluongo - Choir
- Production: Conny Plank, Gianna Nannini
- Executive producer: Peter Zumsteg
- Engineer: Detlef Wiederhoff

== Additional infos ==
- Cover photography: Alberto Venzago
- Artwork: Hans Inauen
- Styling: Carla Guido, Moschino, Puma, Lily Farouche

== Charts ==
Chart (1986–1987)	Peak position
Austria (Ö3 Austria Top 40)	4
Germany (Offizielle Deutsche Charts)	20
Italy (Musica e dischi)	3
Switzerland (Schweizer Hitparade)	3

== Certifications ==
Region	Certification	Certified units/sales
Austria (IFPI Austria)	Platinum	50,000^{*}
Germany (BVMI)	Gold	250,000^{^}
Italy (FIMI)	2× Platinum	200,000^{*}
Switzerland (IFPI Switzerland)	Platinum	50,000^{^}
^{*} Sales figures based on certification alone.^{^} Shipments figures based on certification alone.
