= Not Everybody Gets a Happy Ending =

Studio album by Die So Fluid
- Released: February 25, 2008
- Recorded: 2005–2007
- Studio: Criterion Studios
- Genre: Alternative metal
- Length: 47:20
- Label: Parole Records
- Producer: Mark Williams, Drew Richards, & Pat Collier

Die So Fluid chronology
Spawn of Dysfunction (2004)	Not Everybody Gets a Happy Ending (2008)	The World Is Too Big For One Lifetime (2010)

Not Everybody Gets a Happy Ending is the second full-length album by Die So Fluid. It was recorded at Criterion Studios, London, and released through an independent label, Parole Records, in the United Kingdom in 2008. It was distributed by Cargo Records. It was released in the USA several months later through Renaissance Recordings by KOCH Entertainment Distribution.

== Track listing ==
Music by Die So Fluid, Lyrics by Grog

UK Edition (original release)
No.	Title	Length
1.	"Gang of One"	5:29
2.	"Test Confessional"	3:18
3.	"Existential Baby"	4:13
4.	"Kiss and Then the Kick"	3:30
5.	"Happy Hallowe'en"	4:18
6.	"Vorvolaka"	5:54
7.	"Pigsy"	4:41
8.	"Something to Say"	3:02
9.	"Throw You Away"	6:53
10.	"Swam Beneath Me"	0:50
11.	"Not Everybody Gets a Happy Ending"	5:16

== Personnel ==
Band

- Grog – vocals, bass
- Drew "Mr Drew" Richards – guitar
- Al Fletcher – drums

Additional Performers

- Samy Bishai - violin and string arrangement on "Throw You Away"
- Lulu Berger-Sparey - backing vocals on "Not Everybody Gets a Happy Ending"
- Stefanie Gross - spoken German on "Not Everybody Gets a Happy Ending"

Production

- Mark Williams - producer
- Pat Collier - additional engineering on "Vorvolaka", "Something to Say", and "Not Everybody Gets a Happy Ending"
- Alan Douches - mastering
- Uncle Vania - illustrations
- Shelley Hannan - design
- Paul Harries - photography
- Mia Bergius - live photography

== Singles ==
"Happy Hallowe’en" and "Existential Baby" were released as digital singles in support of the album.
