= G. N. (album) =

Studio album by Gianna Nannini
- Released: 1981
- Genre: Rock
- Label: Dischi Ricordi
- Producer: Roberto Cacciapaglia

Gianna Nannini chronology
| California (1979) | G. N. (1981) | Latin Lover (1982) |

G. N. is the fourth studio album by Gianna Nannini, released in 1981. It has been described as "tense and transitional", and characterized by "a quite heterogeneous tracklist that lacks overall cohesion". Ondarock wrote about it: "A convulsive and cosmopolitan rock dominates, more in step with the times than the previous album, permeated at times with new wave flavours". The leading single "Vieni ragazzo" ranked second at Festivalbar. The songs "Vieni ragazzo" and "Come un treno" were included in the soundtrack of Michelangelo Antonioni's Identification of a Woman.

== Track listing ==
All songs by Gianna Nannini

1. "Vieni Ragazzo" – 3:46
2. "Nessuna Direzione" – 3:51
3. "Bi Bip" – 3:01
4. "Uò-Uò" – 5:30
5. "Occhi Aperti" – 3:37
6. "Autostrada" – 3:56
7. "Come Un Treno" – 4:26
8. "Stop" – 3:25

== Personnel ==
- Vocals: Gianna Nannini
- Guitar: Tony Soranno
- Bass: Claudio Golinelli
- Keyboards: Stefano Previsti
- Drums: Gianni Dall'Aglio, Francesco Nizza
- Production: Roberto Cacciapaglia

== Charts ==
| Chart (1981) | Peak position |
|---|---|
| Italy (Musica e dischi) | 24 |
