= California (Gianna Nannini album) =

Studio album by Gianna Nannini
- Released: 1979
- Genre: Rock
- Length: 37:28
- Label: Dischi Ricordi / Metronome
- Producer: Michelangelo Romano

Gianna Nannini chronology
Una radura (1977)	California (1979)	G. N. (1981)

California is the third album by Gianna Nannini and was released in 1979. The album marked Nannini's decisive leap into rock, and included her first hit, "America", which made her known in Germany and Northern Europe. The provocative cover features the Statue of Liberty holding a stars and stripes vibrator. The album sold over 100,000 copies in Germany alone. Roberto Vecchioni collaborated uncredited to the lyrics.

== Track listing ==
All songs by Gianna Nannini except as noted.

1. "America" – 4:20
2. "California" – 8:14
3. "Good Bye My Heart" – 6:19
4. "Io e Bobby McGee" (Cover version of "Me and Bobby McGee") (Kris Kristofferson / Fred Foster / Gianna Nannini) - 4:38
5. "Sognami" – 4:01
6. "La lupa e le stelle" – 4:08
7. "Lei" – 5:44

=== Charts ===
Chart (1979–1980)	Peak position
German Albums (Offizielle Top 100)	35

== Personnel ==
- Walter Calloni - Drums, Percussion
- Dino d'Antonio - Bass
- Kris Kristofferson - Composer
- Gianna Nannini - Composer, Piano, Primary Artist, Vocals
- Mauro Paoluzzi - Composer, Guitar
- Claudio Pascoli - Saxophone
- Stefano Pulga - Keyboards
- Michelangelo Romano - Producer
