= Fazi =

Fazi is a surname. Notable people with the surname include:

- Abdul Fazi, 17th century Indian history
- Dorra al-Fazi' (born 1975), Tunisian writer and lawyer
- Juri Fazi (born 1961), Italian judoka
- Mélanie Fazi (born 1976), French novelist and translator
- Mohamed Fazi (born 1967), Afghan Taliban leader
- Roman Fazi (born 1999), Afghan footballer
