= Meravigliosa creatura =

Single by Gianna Nannini

from the album Dispetto
- Released: 1 January 1995 (Italy)
- Genre: Pop rock
- Length: 3:59
- Label: Polydor
- Songwriter: Mara Redeghieri
- Producers: Gianna Nannini; Dave Allen

"Meravigliosa creatura" (Italian pronunciation: [meraviʎˈʎoːsa kreaˈtuːra, -oːza -]; "Wonderful Creature") is a song by Italian rock vocalist Gianna Nannini, written by Mara Redeghieri (vocalist at Üstmamò). The single was simultaneously on air on different radio networks on 1 January 1995, one minute after midnight, and it anticipated the release of the album Dispetto, which was expected on 13 February of the same year in all Europe.

In 2004, "Meravigliosa creatura" was featured on the album Perle with a new arrangement of the song, a new slow version with piano and chord instruments that was finished as a last arrangement of February 2007, 3 years after Perle was released. The final arrangement was chosen as the soundtrack for the Fiat Bravo spot, helping the it to get back in the charts even though it was not released as a single. Mostly driven by internet downloads, the song reached the number one in charts for the third time in the singer musical career; 17 years had passed since Nannini had last reached the singles top.

== Charts ==
Chart (1995–2007)	Peak position
Germany (GfK)	60
Italy (Musica e dischi)	2
Italy Airplay (Music & Media)	7
Italy Digital Singles (FIMI)	1
Portugal Digital Songs (Billboard)	2
Switzerland (Schweizer Hitparade)	33

== Certifications ==
Region	Certification	Certified units/sales
Italy (FIMI)	Gold	25,000^{‡}
^{‡} Sales+streaming figures based on certification alone.
