= Cuore (magazine) =

Spanish celebrity magazine (2006–2020)

- Categories: Celebrity magazine Women's magazine
- Frequency: Weekly
- Circulation: 229,050 (2011)
- Publisher: Zoom Ediciones, S.A.
- Founded: 2006
- First issue: May 2006
- Final issue: April 2020
- Company: Grupo Zeta
- Country: Spain
- Based in: Madrid
- Language: Spanish
- Website: Cuore

Cuore was a weekly women's magazine based in Madrid, Spain. It was in circulation between May 2006 and April 2020.

== History and profile ==
Cuore was established in 2006. The first issue was published in May 2006. The magazine was part of Grupo Zeta. It was headquartered in Madrid and was published weekly by Zoom Ediciones, S.A. It featured articles on celebrities and other topics addressing women aged between 20 and 35.

The founding editor was Alvaro Bermejo Garcia. Cuore had a Portuguese version distributed in Portugal.

Cuore was the third-best selling magazine in Spain in 2007. In 2008 its circulation was 216,959 copies, making it the fifth best-selling magazine in its category in Spain. The magazine sold 226,318 copies in 2010 and 229,050 copies in 2011.

The last issue of Cuore appeared in April 2020, and it was reported in July 2020 that the magazine ceased publication due to the COVID-19 pandemic which interfered with distribution of the magazine.
