= Feline (band) =

English band

- Also known as: Ultraviolet
- Origin: London, United Kingdom
- Genres: Alternative rock/pop
- Years active: 1995–2000
- Label: Chrysalis Records
- Past members: Grog; Drew Richards; Ted Garcia; Al Fletcher

Feline were an English alternative rock/pop group formed in Camden, London, in 1995. Their sound was described by journalist Mike Pattenden as "new goth", a mix of Eighties bands like Siouxsie and the Banshees and The Cure with contemporary acts like The Smashing Pumpkins. Guitarist Drew Richards added, "[but] you won't catch us lying around on gravestones".

"They are very cool animals, self-possessed, and they've been potent mystical symbols throughout time", explained front-person Grog to the music industry trade press, "which we thought reflected the power of this band". Initially formed as a vehicle for Grog to record a solo album following the dissolution of her first band, Feline became a fully fledged band when musicians were recruited to perform with her. Grog herself sported a tattoo of the band's logo on her shoulder.

Feline signed to a major-label record deal with Chrysalis Records and released their debut album, Save Your Face, in 1997. Despite receiving positive press from Music Week, NME and Kerrang!, the band were dropped after a few years as part of a company-wide roster clear out. The band members renamed themselves Ultraviolet in order to attract a second label deal before disbanding the project to focus on heavier rock music, becoming the enduring metal band Die So Fluid.

== Flinch (1993-1995) ==
Grog's first band, Flinch, attracted press interest as one of the UK's most promising bands of 1994, following the release of their debut EP A Dummy to Love and winning Best New Act at that years In The City showcase. Two independent singles ("Ordinary (This Can't Be)", "Faking") on Dilo!, an offshoot of the Vinyl Solution record label, led to Flinch recording a live session in Maida Vale Studios for BBC Radio 1's John Peel at the end of 1994. Flinch submitted the demo for "Days" for inclusion on the cult Volume 12 compilation magazine, alongside notable debut cuts from acts such as Garbage and Catatonia. In 1995, Flinch released a further two singles, "Jamie D" and "Skin Deep", and recorded demos for their debut full-length release, provisionally titled Sincere. Flinch played a set at the Reading Festival which was broadcast live on Radio One. Before releasing their first album, Flinch disbanded due to what was described later as a lack of commitment and direction.

== Feline (1996-1998) ==
After the dissolution of Flinch, Grog recruited the band's manager Drew Richards to help write material and perform guitar for her on a solo project. Adding a further two musicians at the end of 1995, Ted Garcia on guitar and Steve Drew on drums, helped the line-up for Feline solidify as a handful of demos were recorded for what now had become Grog's second band. Several record labels indicated interest in her new group. In June 1996, Feline signed a major worldwide deal with Chrysalis Records, a subsidiary of EMI, thanks to Flinch being spotted years earlier by label boss Gordon Biggins while he was an A+R rep at Colombia. Feline were Biggins first signing upon taking over at Chrysalis. Feline spent their first year honing their live performance and material at club gigs such as Camden's Barfly and a set at the Phoenix Festival.

Feline recorded the bulk of their debut album, Save Your Face, over three weeks in December 1996 at Olympic Studios in London, England, with producer David M. Allen, known for his work on The Cure's Disintegration and Wish. The album was mixed by Pat Collier in London's Eden Studios, while a further two tracks ("Just As You Are" and "Not What It Seems") were mixed by Tom Lord-Alge at South Beach Studios in Miami, Florida. By mid-1997, Feline had procured a management deal with Sanctuary and had recruited a new drummer Mig in time for a summer tour as support act for label-mates Kenickie, and then back on the road headlining rock clubs throughout the UK, including a headlining appearance at NME's "On" night in July 1997.

On 4 August 1997, Feline's debut single "Just As You Are" was released in the UK, backed with b-sides "Highway", "Shape Changing" and "Two Minds", on CD maxi and 7" vinyl. "Just As You Are" spent a single week on the Official Charts at No. 81. After "Just As You Are" music video was A-listed by MTV Europe, Feline performed a live set for the station, and Grog was interviewed by Julia Valet for MTV UK & Ireland's Superock programme in advance of the release of Save Your Face on 1 September. In October, Save Your Face was released in Japan with three additional bonus tracks ( "Highway", "Shape Changing" from the debut single and one exclusive titled "Germaine"). In late 1997, EMI released Come Again, a charity album to donate funds to their Music Sound Foundation. Feline recorded a cover version of The Hollies "The Air That I Breathe" for the compilation.

At the start of 1998, Feline recorded new material self-produced by Drew ("Drama Queen" and "Bad Habit"), which were both mixed by Chris Sheldon, who also remixed "Sun In My Eyes", "Fantasy World" and "Can't Help Myself". In March, Feline toured the UK with Radiator in support of Catherine Wheel, where "Can't Help Myself" was included on a three-track sampler given to the first 50 people in line at each show. On 11 May 1998, the new mix of "Sun In My Eyes" was released as a single on two CD singles and 7" vinyl. The first CD featured new recordings "Innocent Smile" and "Rumour Mill", while the second CD included "The Air That I Breathe" and "Germaine". The single peaked at No. 81 on the single chart the following week. Feline supported the release of the single with further tour dates with Carrie, and an appearance at Italy's Beach Bum festival in July alongside Marilyn Manson, Cornershop and Asian Dub Foundation. The band recruited another new drummer, Al Fletcher, for these shows.

"Drama Queen" was scheduled for single release on CD and 7" on 6 July 1998, however the single was cancelled after promos were distributed to the press. On 3 August, Save Your Face was re-released under the title Feline. The new edition was repackaged and expanded with the new Chris Sheldon tracks ("Drama Queen" and "Bad Habit"). In late 1998, EMI cleared out their roster, dropping Feline from their record deal.

== Ultraviolet (1999–2000) ==
The band's management suggested changing the band's name to help get them re-signed with another label. Taking their advice, Feline was duly renamed as Ultraviolet, and material for a second album was recorded by Drew Richards throughout 1999. Sanctuary issued "Unknown" as a single and a six-track mini-album titled Memoirs of a Psychopath direct to indie stores during this time. A final four songs ("Wish You Were Dead", "Advice", "Alive" and "Making Hate") were recorded and mixed by Pat Collier before Feline officially disbanded.

Grog, Drew and Al re-emerged as Die So Fluid, who continue to record throughout the following two decades. Grog became known to pop music fans when she guest performed bass guitar for Melanie C and Kelly Osbourne throughout 2003. Ted Garcia joined Horsepower, then went on to become a corporate lawyer for Pinsent Mansons, and manage a Glasgow-based band called San Sebastian.

On 12 December 2013, after going unreleased for thirteen years, Feline's second album Ultraviolet was made available for purchase and download from Die So Fluid's Bandcamp page. Ultraviolet consisted of the six Memoirs EP tracks, the "Unknown" b-sides and previously unreleased Pat Collier recordings.

In 2016, Ultraviolet was re-released on label Strataville.

== Discography ==
=== Albums ===
- Save Your Face (1997)
- Ultraviolet (2000)

=== Singles ===
- "Just As You Are"
- "Sun in My Eyes"
- "Unknown"
