= Félines =

Félines may refer to the following places in France:

- Félines, Ardèche, a commune in the department of Ardèche
- Félines, Haute-Loire, a commune in the department of Haute-Loire
- Félines-Minervois, a commune in the department of Hérault
- Félines-sur-Rimandoule, a commune in the department of Drôme
- Félines-Termenès, a commune in the department of Aude
