= Latin Lover (album) =

Studio album by Gianna Nannini
- Released: 1982
- Genre: Rock
- Label: Dischi Ricordi / Metronome
- Producer: Conny Plank / Gianna Nannini

Gianna Nannini chronology
G. N. (1981)	Latin Lover (1982)	Puzzle (1984)

Latin Lover is the fifth album by Gianna Nannini, released in 1982.

The first album made in collaboration with the German producer Conny Plank, it performed well all around Europe, and features prominent guest musicians such as Annie Lennox, Jaki Liebezeit and Annette Humpe. In October of the same year, Nannini performed at the Rockpalast Essen stage alongside Kid Creole & The Coconuts and Little Steven. In Germany, it sold about 250,000 copies.

== Track listing ==
1. "Primadonna" (M. Paoluzzi - Gianna Nannini) – 3:47
2. "Wagon-Lits" (Gianna Nannini - M. Paoluzzi/Gianna Nannini) – 4:10
3. "Ragazzo Dell'Europa" (Gianna Nannini) – 3:34
4. "Latin Lover" (Gianna Nannini - M. Paoluzzi/Gianna Nannini) - 4:35
5. "Fumetto" (Gianna Nannini) – 3:30
6. "Carillon" (Gianna Nannini) – 4:05
7. "Amore Amore" (Gianna Nannini) – 4:13
8. "Volo 5/4" (Gianna Nannini) - 4:20

== Personnel ==
- Gianna Nannini – Vocals, piano, violin
- Hans Bäär – Bass, keyboards
- Rüdiger Braune – Drums
- Conny Plank – Drums, programming
- Rudy Spinello – Guitar
- Jaki Liebezeit – Drums
- Mauro Pagani – Mandoline, violin
- Mauro Paoluzzi – Guitar
- Annie Lennox – Piano
- Annette Humpe – Piano
- The Wolperats – Backing vocals
- Production: Conny Plank, Gianna Nannini

== Charts ==
=== Weekly charts ===
Chart (1982–1983)	Peak position
German Albums (Offizielle Top 100)	18
Italy (Musica e dischi)	24

=== Year-end charts ===
Chart (1983)	Position
German Albums (Offizielle Top 100)	44
