= Save Your Face =

Studio album by Feline
- Released: 1 September 1997
- Recorded: December 1996–1997; London, United Kingdom
- Genre: Alternative rock/New wave
- Length: 44:43
- Label: Chrysalis Records
- Producer: David M. Allen

Feline chronology
Save Your Face (1997)	Ultraviolet (2000)

Singles from Save Your Face
- 1. "Just As You Are" Released: 4 August 1997; 2. "Sun In My Eyes" Released: 11 May 1998

Professional ratings
Review scores
Source	Rating
Allmusic	3/5 stars

Save Your Face is the debut album by British alternative rock group Feline and was released worldwide in 1997. It was preceded by "Just As You Are", the video of which was picked up by MTV Europe. The following year, the album was repackaged, retitled as Feline and expanded with two newly recorded tracks produced by Feline guitarist Drew Richards. Three of the Save Your Face tracks were remixed by Chris Sheldon for the new release, which was preceded by "Sun In My Eyes" and the cancelled "Drama Queen".

== Recording sessions ==
Feline recorded the bulk of Save Your Face over three weeks in December 1996 at Olympic Studios in London, England, with producer David M. Allen, who was known for his work on The Cure's Disintegration and Wish. Allen was chosen to produce the record because the band purposely did not want to sound like their influences. The album was mixed by Pat Collier in London's Eden Studios, while a further two tracks ("Just As You Are" and "Not What It Seems") were mixed by Tom Lord-Alge at South Beach Studios in Miami, Florida. Extra material was recorded for use as b-sides and a charity album cover version of The Hollies "The Air That I Breathe". Photography for the original album package was taken by Perou, with art direction and design by Andy Vella.

At the start of 1998, Feline recorded new material self-produced by Drew ("Drama Queen" and "Bad Habit"), both of which were mixed by Chris Sheldon, who also remixed "Sun In My Eyes", "Fantasy World" and "Can't Help Myself". On 3 August, Save Your Face was re-released under the title Feline. The new edition was repackaged and expanded with the new Chris Sheldon tracks.

== Single releases ==
On 4 August 1997, the first single from Save Your Face, "Just As You Are" was released in the UK, backed with b-sides "Highway", "Shape Changing" and "Two Minds" on CD maxi and 7" vinyl. "Just As You Are" spent a single week on the Official Charts at No. 81. "Just As You Are" was later issued in Europe on CD single (featuring "Highway") and CD maxi (featuring all three extra tracks). The music video for "Just As You Are" was directed by Howard Greenhalgh and featured the band morphing into insects and other animals. Despite the use of CGI, the video cost the label £67,000.

On 11 May 1998, Chris Sheldon's new mix of "Sun In My Eyes" was released as a single on two CD singles and 7" vinyl. The first CD featured new recordings "Innocent Smile" and "Rumour Mill", while the second CD included "The Air That I Breathe" and "Germaine" (which had been only released in Japan prior). "Sun In My Eyes" peaked at #81 on the single chart the following week. In Europe, "Sun In My Eyes" was released as a single CD maxi.

Newly recorded Feline cut "Drama Queen" was scheduled for single release on CD and 7" on 6 July 1998, however the single was cancelled after promos were distributed to the music press. B-sides were stated in reviews as "Wake The Dead" (05:46), "Live With Me" (3:50) and "Wheel" (05:21) These have as yet gone unreleased.

== Track listing ==
No.	Title	Writer(s)	Production/Mix	Length
1.	"Just As You Are"	Grog	David M. Allen/Tom Lord-Alge	3:47
2.	"Sun In My Eyes"	Grog/Drew Richards	David M. Allen/Pat Collier	3:06
3.	"Shocks & Surprises"	Grog/Drew Richards	David M. Allen/Pat Collier	4:30
4.	"Not What It Seems"	Grog	David M. Allen/Tom Lord-Alge	4:51
5.	"Fantasy World"	Grog	David M. Allen/Pat Collier	4:11
6.	"Play With Fire"	Grog	David M. Allen/Pat Collier	5:20
7.	"Can't Help Myself"	Grog	David M. Allen/Pat Collier	4:58
8.	"Mother"	Grog	David M. Allen/Pat Collier	4:55
9.	"Property"	Grog	David M. Allen/Pat Collier	3:46
10.	"Release"	Grog	David M. Allen/Pat Collier	5:33
Total length:				44:48

Japanese edition
No.	Title	Writer(s)	Production/Mix	Length
1.	"Just As You Are"	Grog	David M. Allen/Tom Lord-Alge	3:47
2.	"Sun In My Eyes"	Grog/Drew Richards	David M. Allen/Pat Collier	3:06
3.	"Shocks & Surprises"	Grog/Drew Richards	David M. Allen/Pat Collier	4:30
4.	"Not What It Seems"	Grog	David M. Allen/Tom Lord-Alge	4:51
5.	"Fantasy World"	Grog	David M. Allen/Pat Collier	4:11
6.	"Play With Fire"	Grog	David M. Allen/Pat Collier	5:20
7.	"Can't Help Myself"	Grog	David M. Allen/Pat Collier	4:58
8.	"Mother"	Grog	David M. Allen/Pat Collier	4:55
9.	"Property"	Grog	David M. Allen/Pat Collier	3:46
10.	"Release"	Grog	David M. Allen/Pat Collier	5:33
11.	"Germane"	Grog	David M. Allen/Pat Collier	4:25
12.	"Highway"	Grog	David M. Allen/Pat Collier	4:12
13.	"Shape Changing"	Grog	David M. Allen/Pat Collier	4:57

Feline re-release
No.	Title	Writer(s)	Production/Mix	Length
1.	"Just As You Are"	Grog	David M. Allen/Tom Lord-Alge	3:47
2.	"Sun In My Eyes"	Grog/Drew Richards	David M. Allen/Chris Sheldon	3:06
3.	"Drama Queen"	Grog	Drew Richards/Chris Sheldon	3:56
4.	"Shocks & Surprises"	Grog/Drew Richards	David M. Allen/Pat Collier	4:30
5.	"Not What It Seems"	Grog	David M. Allen/Tom Lord-Alge	4:51
6.	"Bad Habit"	Grog	Drew Richards/Chris Sheldon	4:23
7.	"Fantasy World"	Grog	David M. Allen/Chris Sheldon	4:11
8.	"Play With Fire"	Grog	David M. Allen/Pat Collier	5:20
9.	"Can't Help Myself"	Grog	David M. Allen/Chris Sheldon	4:58
10.	"Mother"	Grog	David M. Allen/Pat Collier	4:55
11.	"Property"	Grog	David M. Allen/Pat Collier	3:46
12.	"Release"	Grog	David M. Allen/Pat Collier	5:33
Total length:				53:10

== Credits and personnel ==
Performances

- vocals, bass guitar, piano, Juno: Georgina Prebble ("Grog")
- Guitar, guitar synth, programming, backing vocals: Drew Richards
- Guitar: Eduardo L. Garcia
- drums, backing vocals: Steve Drew
- Drums: Mig (On "Drama Queen" and "Bad Habit")

Production

- Recorded at Olympic, Matrix, Raezor, Sarm West and Trident Lodge studios.
- Produced by David M. Allen, except "Drama Queen" and "Bad Habit" produced by Drew Richards.
- Mixed at Eden Studios in London, United Kingdom by Pat Collier, except
  "Just As You Are" and "Not What It Seems" mixed at Southbeach Studios, Miami, Florida by Tom Lord-Alge and
  "Drama Queen" and "Bad Habit" mixed by Chris Sheldon.

== Release history ==
Region	Date	Format	Label
United Kingdom	1 September 1997	CD; cassette	Chrysalis Records
Japan	8 October 1997	CD with three bonus tracks	EMI Japan
United Kingdom	3 August 1998	CD repackaged and retitled as Feline	Chrysalis Records
Worldwide	2008	Digital download	Chrysalis Records
