= Stray Cats (disambiguation) =

Stray Cats are an American rockabilly band formed in 1979.

Stray Cats may also refer to:

- Stray Cats (album), 1981 by Stray Cats
- The Stray Cats, a fictional band in Stardust (1974 film)
- Stray Cats, disc one of So Much Shouting, So Much Laughter by Ani DiFranco, 2002
- Stray Cats, a collection of singles and non-album tracks from The Rolling Stones in Mono, 2016

== See also ==
- Stray (disambiguation)
- Cat (disambiguation)
- Cats (disambiguation)
- Estray, in law, any domestic animal found wandering at large or lost
- Feral cat
- The Stray Cat, a 2014 Mexican telenovela
