= Malafemmina =

- Cover photography by Peter Ashworth

Studio album by Gianna Nannini
- Released: 1988
- Recorded: Spring 1988
- Genre: Rock
- Label: Polydor
- Producer: Alan Moulder, Gianna Nannini

Gianna Nannini chronology
| Maschi e altri (1987) | Malafemmina (1988) | Scandalo (1990) |

Malafemmina is Gianna Nannini's eighth studio album, and tenth album overall.

== Composition ==
Produced by Nannini and Alan Moulder, Malafemmina is a concept album which in each song explores of a different facet of the female universe, and has been described as "an attempt to make a Mediterranean rock in which Maghrebi rhythms are fused, often happily, with the Anglo-American-derived harmonic archetype."

== Release ==
The album's lead single "Hey bionda" was released in July 1988. The single, described as "an anti-war tarantella dance song", became the opening theme song of the 1988 Festivalbar.

The album was released on 5 September 1988. A Malafemmina Tour to promote the album, consisting of 48 dates across 10 countries, was held between October and December 1988.

== Track listing ==
1. "Hey bionda" (Nannini-I. Campaner/Nannini) – 4:38
2. "Voglio fare l'amore" (Nannini-F. Pianigiani/Nannini) - 4:17
3. "Time Lover" (Nannini-F. Pianigiani/Nannini) – 3:07
4. "Un ragazzo come te" (Nannini-F. Pianigiani/Nannini) - 3:49
5. "Luci rosse" (Nannini-I. Campaner/Nannini) – 3:51
6. "Luna dell'est" (Nannini-I. Campaner/Nannini) – 4:31
7. "Aiuto" (Nannini-I. Campaner/Nannini) – 3:54
8. "Revolution" (Nannini-I. Campaner/Nannini) - 3:48
9. "Cuore zingaro" (Nannini-I. Campaner/Nannini) - 4:40
10. "Casablanca" (Nannini-F. Pianigiani/Nannini) - 4:24
11. "Donne in amore" (G. Nannini) - 2:53

== Charts ==
| Chart (1988–1989) | Peakt position |
|---|---|
| Austria (Ö3 Austria Top 40) | 12 |
| Italy (Musica e dischi) | 2 |
| Sweden (Topplistan) | 12 |
| Switzerland (Schweizer Hitparade) | 5 |
| West Germany (Media Control) | 12 |

== Personnel ==
- Gianna Nannini - Vocals, piano
- Marco Colombo - Guitars
- David A. Steward - Guitars
- Igor Campaner - Keyboards, choir
- Rolf Lammers - Organ, keyboards
- Nick Davies - Bass, stick
- Rüdiger Braune - Drums, percussion
- Alan Moulder - Keyboards
- Andy Wright - Keyboards, programming
- "The Wolperaths" - Choir
- Production: Alan Moulder, Gianna Nannini
- Executive producer: Peter Zumsteg
- Recording engineer: Bruno Gebhard
- Mix: Alan Moulder at Trident IL Studios, London (Assistant engineer: Adrian Bushby)
- Mix: Logic Studios, Milan (Assistant engineer: Antonio Baglio, Pino Pischetola)
- Mastering: Kevin Metcalfe at "The Townhouse", London

== Additional information ==
- Cover photography: Peter Ashworth
- Artwork: Nino Haslach, Erich Zinsli
- Styling: Carla Guido, Giorgio
- Recorded Spring 1988 at Conny's Studio, Neunkichen/Cologne, Germany
