= Gianna Nannini (album) =

Studio album by Gianna Nannini
- Released: 1976
- Genre: Rock
- Label: Dischi Ricordi
- Producer: Claudio Fabi

Gianna Nannini chronology
Gianna Nannini (1976)	Una radura (1977)

Gianna Nannini is the first album by Gianna Nannini, released in 1976. It was produced by Claudio Fabi, and caused a stir for the abortion-themed song "Morta per autoprocurato aborto".

== Track listing ==
All songs by Gianna Nannini.

1. "Come Un Angelo" - 4:02
2. "Storia Di Un Sorriso" - 3:42
3. "E Poi Viaggiai" - 3:52
4. "Un'Anima Di Sughero" - 4:13
5. "Addio" - 4:06
6. "Ti Avevo Chiesto Solo Di Toccarmi" - 4:27
7. "Fantasia" - 4:27
8. "Ma Lasciati Andare" - 3:27
9. "Morta Per Autoprocurato Aborto" - 3:25
10. "Il Pastore" - 3:35

== Personnel ==
- Gianna Nannini - vocals, piano
- Massimo Luca - acoustic guitar
- Claudio Fabi - keyboards, synth, production
- Paolo Donnarumma - bass
- Claudio Bazzari - guitar
- Gianni Dall'Aglio - drums
- Luigi Mucciolo - flicorno
- Claudio Pascoli - sax
- Piero Dosso - bassoon
- Stefano Montanari - English corn
