= Aria (Gianna Nannini album) =

Studio album by Gianna Nannini
- Released: 27 November 2002
- Recorded: May – October 2001
- Studio: Dreamtools/Powerplay Studios (Maur, Switzerland); CTS Studios (London)
- Genre: Rock
- Length: 56:05
- Label: Polydor
- Producer: Armand Volker, Gianna Nannini

Gianna Nannini chronology
Momo (2001)	Aria (2002)	Perle (2004)

Aria is the seventeenth album released by Gianna Nannini in 2002. It reached number 7 on the Italian album chart and number 29 on the album chart in Switzerland.

== Track listing ==
1. "Volo"
2. "Uomini A Metà"
3. "Aria"
4. "DJ Morphine"
5. "Sveglia"
6. "Immortale"
7. "Crimine D'amore"
8. "Meravigliosamente Crudele"
9. "Mio"
10. "Amore Cannibale"
11. "Battiti E Respiri"
12. "Un Dio Che Cade"
13. "Nuova Era"

== Personnel ==
- Gianna Nannini - vocals
- Thomas Lang - drums
- Production: Armand Volker, Armand Volker & Gianna Nannini (track 3)
- Co-production: Christian Lohr
- Executive producer: Peter Zumsteg

== Charts ==
Chart (2002)	Position
Italian Albums (FIMI)	7
Swiss Albums (Schweizer Hitparade)	29
