= Scandalo =

Studio album by Gianna Nannini
- Released: 1990
- Studio: RAK Studios
- Genre: Rock
- Label: Polydor
- Producer: David M. Allen, Gianna Nannini

Gianna Nannini chronology
Malafemmina (1988)	Scandalo (1990)	Giannissima (1991)

Scandalo (Scandal) is Gianna Nannini's ninth studio album and eleventh album overall.

== Composition ==
Nannini started composing the album during a trip in Japan and China, and developed it between Wuppertal and Milan. It was recorded at RAK Studios in London, under the co-production of David M. Allen. Nannini explained the title as "Scandal is the only way we have to rebel against certain prepackaged statuses of life that do not correspond in the least to everyday reality."

== Release ==
The album was released on 27 August 1990, while Nannini was still enjoying international success for "Un'estate italiana". A Scandalo Tour to promote the album, consisting of 44 dates across 12 countries, followed. The eponymous lead single "Scandalo", whose music video was directed by Yello leader Dieter Meier, topped the Italian hit parade. In Italy, in less than two weeks it was certified platinum for having sold over 250,000 copies.

== Reception ==
The album has been described as "characterized by a variety of cues scattered here and there throughout the tracks, [...] a thoroughly professional effort but lacking the energy of other Nannini works".

== Track listing ==
1. "Scandalo" - 3:33
2. "5 Minuti" - 4:27
3. "Indiana" - 5:06
4. "Dea" - 2:36
5. "E-ya-po E-ya-po" - 3:32
6. "Madonna-Welt" - 4:23
7. "Due Ragazze In Me" - 3:44
8. "Sorridi" - 3:50
9. "Spiriti Amanti" - 4:11
10. "Fiori Del Veleno" - 4:23
11. "Salome'" - 5:06
12. "Una Luce" - 3:54

== Charts ==
Chart (1990)	Peak position
Austria (Ö3 Austria Top 40)	27
Italy (Musica e dischi)	8
Switzerland (Schweizer Hitparade)	10
West Germany (Media Control)	18

== Personnel ==
- Gianna Nannini - vocals, piano, violin
- Hans Bäär - bass
- Rüdiger Braune - drums, percussion
- Marco Colombo - guitars, keyboards, percussion
- Chris Jarrett - guitars
- Andy Wright - keyboards
- Production: David M. Allen, Gianna Nannini
- Execution producer - Peter Zumsteg
