= Puzzle (Gianna Nannini album) =

Studio album by Gianna Nannini
- Released: 1984
- Genre: Rock
- Length: 34:48
- Label: Dischi Ricordi / Metronome
- Producer: Conny Plank

Gianna Nannini chronology
Latin Lover (1982)	Puzzle (1984)	Tutto Live (1985)

Puzzle is the sixth album by Gianna Nannini. It was released in 1984. The first single from the album, "Fotoromanza", was a summer hit and went on to win the Festivalbar, Vota la Voce and a Gold Telegatto Award. The music video was directed by Michelangelo Antonioni. The album went platinum in Italy, with "Fotoromanza" topping the charts in Italy, Switzerland and Austria. The European tour to promote the album culminated with a handful of very successful dates in Berlin, at the Montreaux Jazz Festival and in Cologne, resulted in the album Tutto Live (1985).

== Track listing ==
1. "Kolossal" (Gianna Nannini/Gianna Nannini - R. Riva) – 3:58
2. "Fotoromanza" (Gianna Nannini - Conny Blank/Gianna Nannini - R. Riva) – 4:27
3. "L'Urlo" (Rüdiger Braune/Gianna Nannini - R. Riva) – 4:07
4. "Siamo Ricchi" (Gianna Nannini - M. Paoluzzi/Gianna Nannini - R. Riva) - 4:05
5. "Ciao" (Gianna Nannini - M. Paoluzzi - Conny Blank/Gianna Nannini - R. Riva) - 4:41
6. "Fiesta" (Gianna Nannini/Gianna Nannini - R. Riva) – 3:49
7. "Ballami" (Gianna Nannini/Gianna Nannini - R. Riva) – 4:43
8. "Se Vai Via" (Gianna Nannini - M. Paoluzzi/Gianna Nannini - R. Riva) - 4:41

== Personnel ==
- Gianna Nannini - Vocals, piano, violin
- Hans Bäär - Bass, guitar
- Rüdiger Braune - Drums
- Claudio Cattafesta - Guitar
- Conny Plank - Drums, programming
- Pino Scagliarini - Keyboards
- Rudy Spinello - Guitar, mandolin
- Freddy Steady - Drums
- Production: Conny Plank, Gianna Nannini

== Charts ==
Chart (1984)	Peak position
Austria (Ö3 Austria Top 40)	13
Germany (Offizielle Deutsche Charts)	27
Italy (Musica e dischi)	2
Switzerland (Schweizer Hitparade)	1
