= Bello e impossibile =

Single by Gianna Nannini

from the album Profumo
- B-side: "Vampiro canzone"
- Released: 1986
- Genre: Pop
- Label: Dischi Ricordi
- Songwriters: Gianna Nannini and Fabio Pianigiani

Gianna Nannini singles chronology
"Fotoromanza" (1984)	"Bello e impossibile" (1986)	"I maschi" (1987)

"Bello e impossibile" ('Handsome and Impossible') is a song composed by Gianna Nannini and Fabio Pianigiani and performed by Gianna Nannini. The single peaked at second place on the Italian hit parade, being certified double platinum. It was also certified platinum in Austria and Switzerland, and gold in Germany. Mexican singer Alejandra Guzmán covered the song for her debut album Bye Mamá (1988). Croatian and Yugoslav rock band Jura Stublić & Film recorded a cover, entitled "Lijepo, lijepo, neopisivo", for their compilation album Greatest Hits Vol. 2 (1996).

== Track listing ==
Bello e impossibile - '7" single – SRL 11047 track listing
No.	Title	Writer(s)	Length
1.	"Bello e impossibile"	Nannini, Fabio Pianigiani	4:04
2.	"Vampiro canzone"	Nannini	1:50

Bello e impossibile - 12" maxi-single – SRLM 2066 track listing
No.	Title	Writer(s)	Length
1.	"Bello e impossibile"	Nannini, Pianigiani	4:39
2.	"Come una schiava"	Nannini, Raffaella Riva	5:42

== Charts ==
Chart	Highest position
Italy (Musica e dischi)	2
Austria (Ö3 Austria Top 40)	7
Switzerland (Schweizer Hitparade)	7
