= I maschi =

Single by Gianna Nannini

from the album Maschi e altri
- B-side: "I maschi (Mini-Maxi)"
- Released: 1987
- Genre: Pop
- Label: Dischi Ricordi
- Songwriters: Gianna Nannini and Fabio Pianigiani

Gianna Nannini singles chronology
"Bello e impossibile" (1986)	"I maschi" (1987)	"Hey bionda" (1988)

"I maschi" (Italian for "the males") is a song composed by Gianna Nannini and Fabio Pianigiani and performed by Gianna Nannini. The single peaked at second place on the Italian hit parade. It was also an international hit, which charted in Austria, France, Germany, Belgium and Sweden. The song represented Italy at the 18th World Popular Song Festival in Tokyo. It was the title-track of the compilation album Maschi e altri.

The song was included in the soundtracks of several films, including the Maren Ade's drama Everyone Else and the Mika Kaurismäki's gangster-comedy Helsinki Napoli All Night Long.

== Charts ==
=== Weekly charts ===
Chart (1987–1988)	Peak position
Austria (Ö3 Austria Top 40)	14
Belgium (Ultratop 50 Flanders)	9
France (SNEP)	2
Italy (FIMI)	2
Italy Airplay (Music & Media)	18
Sweden (Sverigetopplistan)	4
West Germany (GfK)	44

=== Year-end charts ===
Chart (1988)	Position
Belgium (Ultratop Flanders)	86

== Track listing ==
- 7" single – SRL 11066
1. "I maschi" (Nannini - Pianigiani) - 4:29
2. "I maschi (Mini-Maxi)" (Nannini - Pianigiani) - 4:29
- 12" maxi single/CD Single – SRLM 2074/887 211-2
1. "I maschi (Extra Long Version)" - 11:45
2. "I maschi (Long Version)" - 6:05
- 12" maxi single Picture Disc – 887 375-1
1. "I maschi (Extra Long Version)" - 11:45
2. "I maschi (Long Version)" - 6:05
3. "America (Live Edit 1985 from TUTTO LIVE)" - 5:05
