= Fotoromanza =

1984 single by Gianna Nannini

Single by Gianna Nannini

from the album Puzzle
- B-side: "Venerdì notte"
- Released: 1984
- Genre: Pop
- Length: 4:27
- Label: Ricordi
- Songwriters: Gianna Nannini; Conny Plank; Raffaella Riva
- Producers: Gianna Nannini; Conny Plank

Gianna Nannini singles chronology
"Primadonna" (1983)	"Fotoromanza" (1984)	"Bla Bla" (1984)

"Fotoromanza" is a song composed by Gianna Nannini, Conny Plank and Raffaella Riva (a member of the pop group Gruppo Italiano) and performed by Gianna Nannini. The single peaked at first place for four consecutive weeks in September 1984 on the Italian hit parade. It won the 1984 edition of Festivalbar and also won "Vota la Voce", a musical event organized by the magazine TV Sorrisi e Canzoni. The music video of the song was directed by the Academy Award winner Michelangelo Antonioni.

The song was later covered by several artists, including Ricchi e Poveri and Iva Zanicchi, and sampled by rapper Marracash for his song "Fotoromanzo". It was included in the soundtrack of the Gianni Amelio's drama film The Stolen Children.

== Track listing and formats ==
- Italian 7-inch single

A. "Fotoromanza" – 4:27
B. "Venerdì notte" – 3:10

== Charts ==
Weekly chart performance for "Fotoromanza"
Chart (1984)	Peak position
Italy (Musica e dischi)	1
Switzerland (Schweizer Hitparade)	4
West Germany (GfK)	60

== See also ==
- List of number-one hits of 1984 (Italy)
