= Gianna Nannini =

Italian singer and songwriter (born 1954)

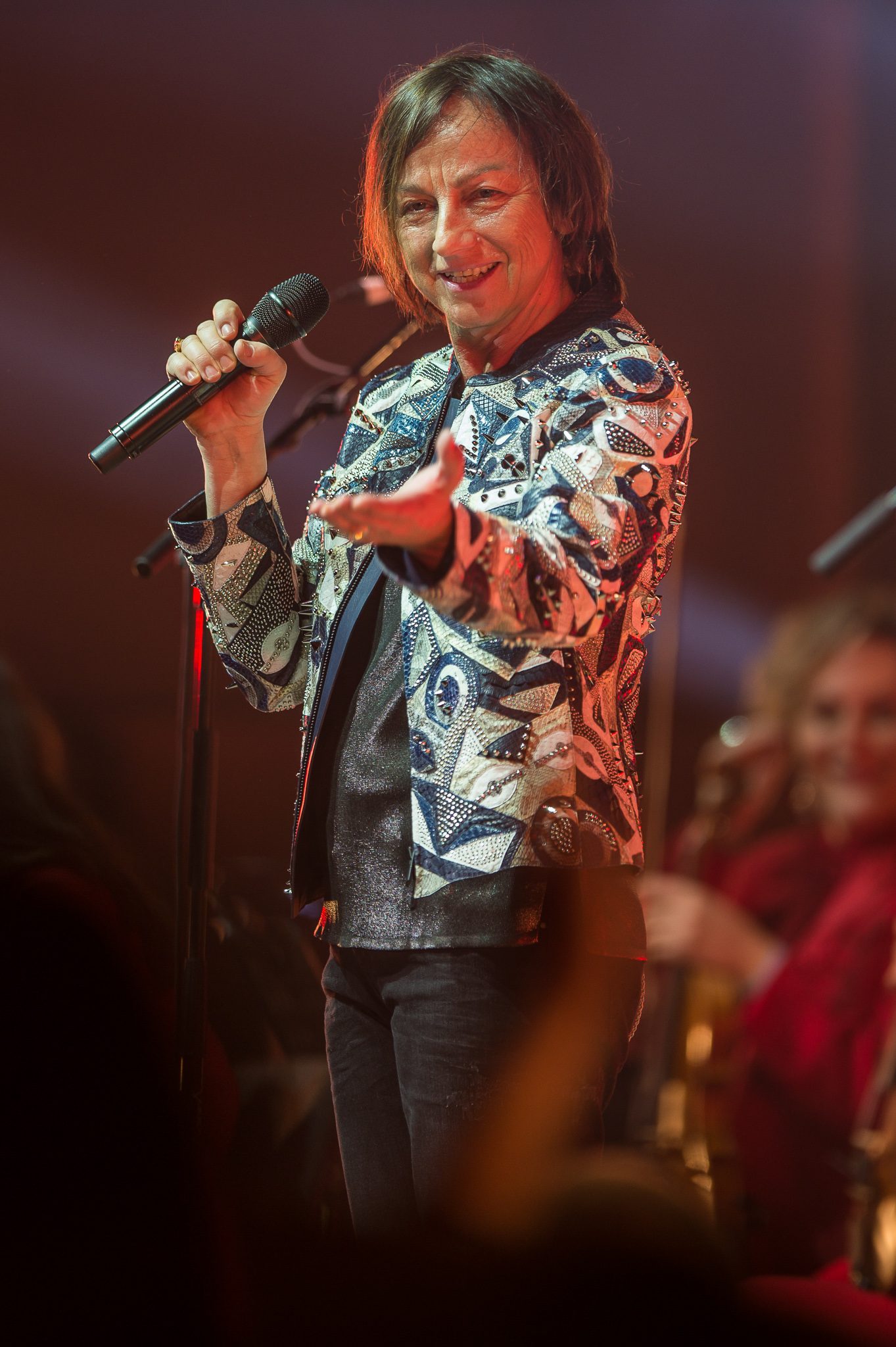
- Nannini performing in 2017

Background information
- Born: 14 June 1954 (age 72); Siena, Tuscany, Italy
- Genres: Rock; pop
- Occupations: Singer; songwriter
- Years active: 1976–present
- Website: giannanannini.com

Gianna Nannini (Italian pronunciation: [ˈdʒanna nanˈniːni]; born 14 June 1954) is an Italian singer and songwriter. Her most notable songs include "America" (1979), "Fotoromanza" (1984), "I maschi" (1987), "Meravigliosa creatura" (1995), "Sei nell'anima" (2006) and "Bello e impossibile" (1986). The latter became a hit across Europe, especially in Austria, Germany, Italy and Switzerland.

== Early life ==
Nannini was born in Siena on 14 June 1954. She studied piano and composition in Milan in the late 1970s.

== Career ==
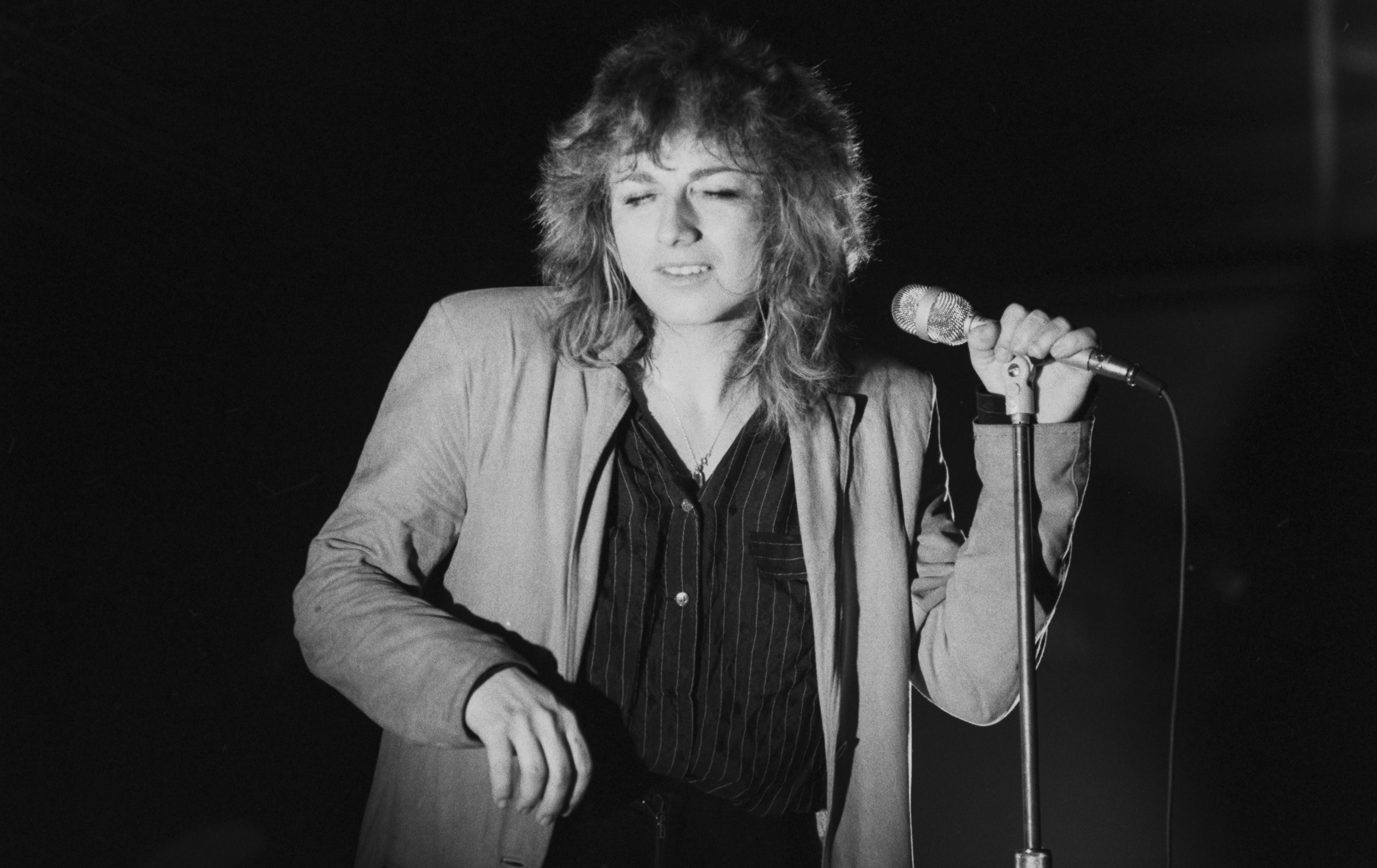
Nannini in 1981

Nannini scored her first domestic hit in 1979 with the single "America" and the album California, which became a success in several European countries. Her international breakthrough happened in 1984 with the release of her sixth album, the Conny Plank-produced Puzzle, which peaked in the top 10 in the Italian, German, Austrian and Swiss charts. The first single from the album, "Fotoromanza", was supported by a music video directed by Michelangelo Antonioni, and went on to win many musical awards. Nannini embarked on a long European tour to support the album, culminating in a headlining gig at the Montreux Jazz Festival.

In 1986, her song "Bello e impossibile" was a European hit in Italy, Germany, Austria and Switzerland. Her 1987 compilation album Maschi e altri sold over a million copies.

In 2004, she released the greatest hits album Perle, where a number of her most renowned songs were rearranged with the support of musicians such as Christian Lohr on piano (who also had a co-producer credit), and a string quartet composed of Vincenzo di Donna (first violin), Luigi de Maio (second violin), Gerardo Morrone (viola) and Antonio di Franca (violoncello). With this orchestra Nannini went on a European tour from 2004 to 2005.

The album Grazie was released in February 2006, and peaked at number one of the Italian hit-parade with the single "Sei nell'anima". In April 2007, Nannini released Pia come la canto io, a collection of songs produced by Wil Malone and originally intended for a rock opera based on the medieval Tuscan character Pia de' Tolomei (briefly mentioned in Dante Alighieri's Purgatorio) that would eventually be performed in 2008 after eleven months of gestation.

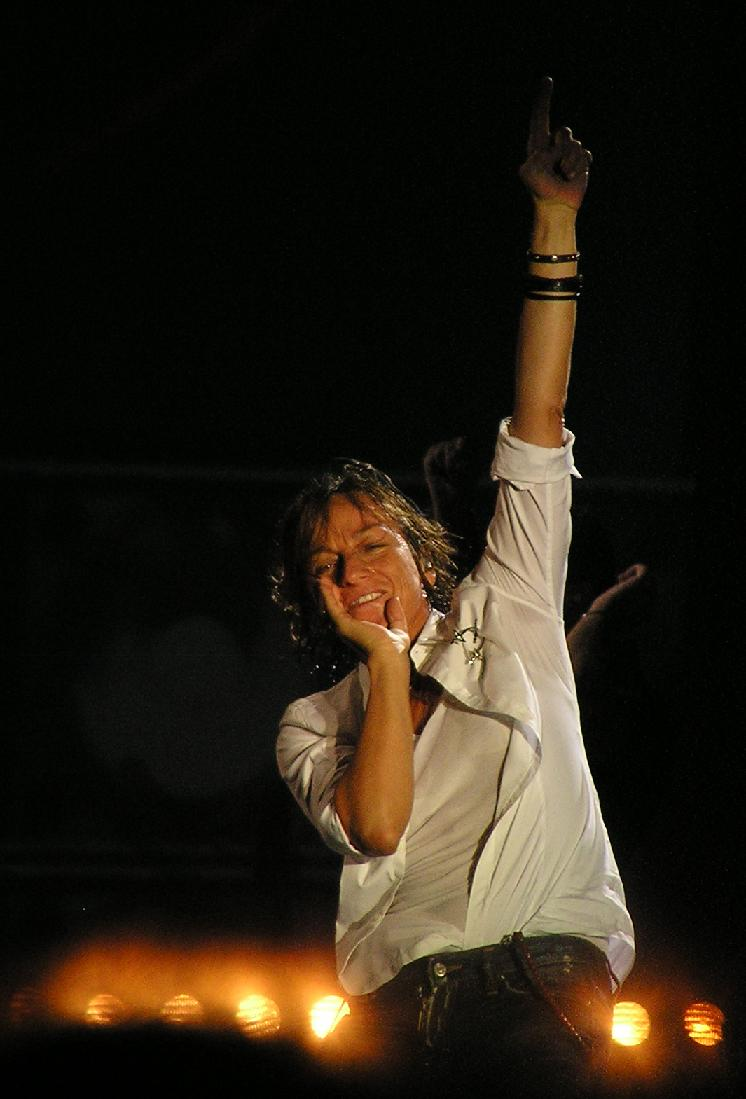
Nannini performing in 2008

An acoustic version of her song "Meravigliosa creatura" (from Perle) has been used in a 2008 advertisement commercial for the Fiat Bravo directed by Matthias Zentner. Fiat would later include another Gianna Nannini song, "Aria", in a subsequent Fiat Bravo ad.

=== Duets and collaborations ===
In 1987, she performed with Sting, Jack Bruce and Eberhard Schoener the "Three Penny Opera" by Bertolt Brecht and Kurt Weill at the Schauspielhaus in Hamburg. In 1990, she and Edoardo Bennato sang "Un'estate italiana", the official song of the 1990 FIFA World Cup composed by Giorgio Moroder. In September 2006, she recorded the single "Because We Believe (Ama credi e vai)" with Andrea Bocelli. Nannini was also featured on Einstürzende Neubauten member Alexander Hacke's solo album Sanctuary, on the track "Per Sempre Butterfly". In 2008, she duetted with the Italian rapper Fabri Fibra in his song "In Italia". She also sang the song "Aria" with the Macedonian vocalist Toše Proeski.

== Band current lineup ==
1. Gianna Nannini – vocals, guitar, violin, piano
2. Milton Mcdonald – guitar, backing vocals
3. Davide Ferrario – keyboards, backing vocals
4. Davide Tagliapietra – guitar, backing vocals
5. Mylious Johnson – drums
6. Alex Klier – bass
7. Will Malone – producer, musical director

== Personal life ==
Nannini's younger brother Alessandro Nannini (born 1959) and her first cousin once removed Matteo Nannini (born 2003) are both racing drivers, with Matteo still racing in Indy NXT.

Nannini obtained a degree in philosophy from the University of Siena in 1994, when in her late 30s. In 1995 she took part in a protest organized by Greenpeace at the French embassy in Rome against the decision of the French government to pursue nuclear experiments at Mururoa. The test occurred on 27 December 1995.

In August 2010, at the age of 56, Nannini announced that she was pregnant (the name of the father was not revealed). Nannini's pregnancy was prominently featured on the cover of Vanity Fair, where she was portrayed wearing a T-shirt with the inscription "God is a Woman". On 26 November 2010 Nannini's daughter Penelope Jane Charlotte was born in Milan. In 2017, Nannini decided to move to London with her partner, Carla. In her 2017 autobiography, entitled Cazzi miei, she revealed she was ready for a civil union with Carla, explaining she felt Italian laws could not give her any guarantee about Penelope's future in the case of Nannini's death.

The Netflix biopic Beautiful Rebel (Sei nell'anima), released in 2024 and starring Letizia Toni, documented Nannini's rise as a singer, punctuated by rebellions against her family, record companies and producers, and social conventions in Italy.

== Discography ==
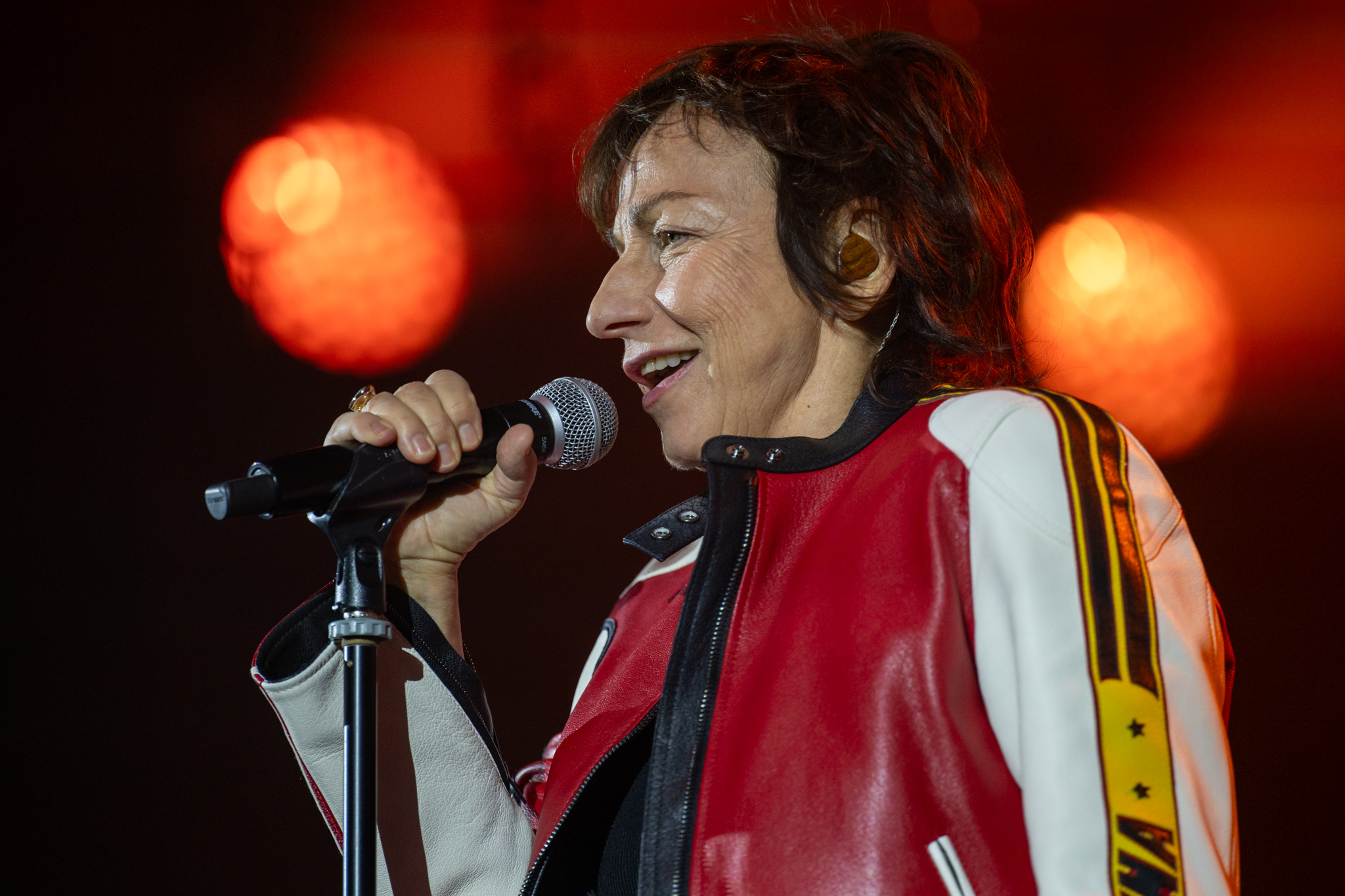
Nannini in 2024

=== Studio albums ===
List of studio albums, with selected chart positions and certifications
Title	Album details	Peak chart positions				Certifications
Title	Album details	ITA	AUT	GER	SWI	Certifications
Gianna Nannini	Released: 1976; Label: Dischi Ricordi	—	—	—	—	
Una radura	Released: 1977; Label: Dischi Ricordi	—	—	—	—	
California	Released: 1979; Label: Dischi Ricordi	—	—	35	—	
G. N.	Released: 1981; Label: Dischi Ricordi	24	—	—	—	
Latin Lover	Released: 1982; Label: Dischi Ricordi	24	—	18	—	BVMI: Gold
Puzzle	Released: 1984; Label: Dischi Ricordi	2	13	27	1	
Profumo	Released: 1986; Label: Dischi Ricordi	3	4	20	3	BVMI: Gold; IFPI SWI: Platinum
Malafemmina	Released: 1988; Label: Dischi Ricordi	2	12	12	5	IFPI SWI: Platinum
Scandalo	Released: 1990; Label: Dischi Ricordi	8	27	18	10	IFPI SWI: Gold
X forza e X amore	Released: 1993; Label: Dischi Ricordi	7	39	51	22	
Dispetto	Released: 1995; Label: Polydor Records	5	—	44	24	
Cuore	Released: 1998; Label: Polydor Records	9	—	—	13	
Aria	Released: 2002; Label: Polydor Records	7	—	—	29	
Perle	Released: 2004; Label: Polydor Records	4	—	56	22	
Grazie	Released: 2006; Label: Polydor Records	1	—	32	12	
Pia come la canto io	Released: 2007; Label: Polydor Records	4	—	—	—	
Giannadream - Solo i sogni sono veri	Released: 2009; Label: Sony Music	2	—	—	28	FIMI: 2× Platinum
Io e te	Released: 2011; Label: Sony Music	1	28	26	4	FIMI: 4× Platinum
Inno	Released: 2013; Label: Sony Music	1	38	60	7	FIMI: Platinum
Hitalia	Released: 2015; Label: Sony Music	1	—	—	26	FIMI: 3× Platinum
Amore gigante	Released: 2017; Label: Sony Music	2	63	—	14	FIMI: Gold
La differenza	Released: 2019; Label: Columbia	4	—	98	14	
Sei nel l'anima	Released: 2024; Label: Columbia	6	60	84	7	

=== Live albums ===
List of live albums, with selected chart positions and certifications
Title	Album details	Peak chart positions				Certifications
Title	Album details	ITA	AUT	GER	SWI	Certifications
Tutto live	Released: 1985; Label: Dischi Ricordi	—	11	47	4	
Giannissima	Released: 1991; Label: Dischi Ricordi	8	36	31	20	IFPI SWI: Gold
Io e te Live	Released: 2011; Label: Sony Music	15	—	—	—	

=== Compilation albums ===
List of compilation albums, with selected chart positions and certifications
Title	Album details	Peak chart positions				Certifications
Title	Album details	ITA	AUT	GER	SWI	Certifications
Maschi e altri	Released: 1987; Label: Dischi Ricordi	5	11	25	27	IFPI SWI: Platinum
Bomboloni	Released: 1996; Label: Polydor Records	10	39	28	26	
GiannaBest	Released: 2007; Label: Sony Music	1	—	32	23	FIMI: Platinum
Hitstory	Released: 2015; Label: Sony Music	5	—	—	51	FIMI: Platinum
GiannaGold	Released: 2026; Label: EMI	13	—	—	50	
