= Dali =

Dali or DALI may refer to:

== Art and popular culture ==
- Dali, a location in Final Fantasy IX
- Dali (Dalida album) (1984)
- Dali (Ali Project album) (1994)
- Espace Dalí, Salvador Dalí's permanent exhibition in France

== Religion ==
- Dali (goddess), a goddess of hunting in Georgian mythology

== Science, technology and business ==
- Danish Audiophile Loudspeaker Industries, a Danish manufacturer of high-end loudspeakers
- Dali Everyday Grocery, Swiss retail chain
- Dali Foods Group, Chinese company
- Dartmouth Assessment of Lifestyle Instrument, a questionnaire for assessing substance abuse disorders
- Digital Addressable Lighting Interface, a network-based protocol for lighting control released 1990s and specified in IEC 62386
- Distance-matrix alignment algorithm used in the FSSP database on structurally similar proteins
- MV Dali, a Singaporean container ship which collided with the Francis Scott Key Bridge

=== Astronomy ===
- 2919 Dali, a main-belt asteroid
- Dali (crater), a crater on Mercury
- Dark Ages Lunar Interferometer, a proposal for a moon-based low-frequency radio observatory, funded under the Astrophysics Strategic Mission Concept Study program

=== Fossil ===
- Dali Man, fossil of human (Homo erectus or archaic H. sapiens) from Dali County, Shaanxi, China.

== Chinese history ==
- Kingdom of Dali (937–1253 AD), centered in modern Yunnan
- Kingdom of Nanzhao or Dali, Kingdom of Dali's predecessor state
- Dali, Emperor Daizong of Tang's third and last regnal period (766–779)
- Dali or Đại Lịch, a state established by Nong Zhigao in 1042 on the Chinese–Vietnamese border

== Places ==
=== Afghanistan ===
- Dali, Afghanistan, a village in Balkh Province

=== China ===
- Dali Bai Autonomous Prefecture, Yunnan
  - Dali City, a county-level city in Dali Prefecture, Yunnan
    - Dali Town, Yunnan
    - Xiaguan, Dali City, also known as Dali New Town
- Dali County, Shaanxi
- Dali, Fujian, a town in Shunchang County, Fujian
- Dali, Guangdong, a town in Foshan, Guangdong
- Dali, Beiliu, a town in Guangxi
- Dali, Teng County, a town in Guangxi
- Dali Subdistrict, Tangshan, Hebei

=== Cyprus ===
- Dali, Cyprus, a village in Cyprus

=== Iran ===
- Dali, Fars, a village in Fars Province, Iran
- Dali, Izeh, a village in Khuzestan Province, Iran
- Dali, West Azerbaijan, a village in West Azerbaijan Province, Iran

=== Niger ===
- Dali, Tanout, former town in Zinder Region, Niger

=== Republic of China (Taiwan) ===
- Dali District, Taichung
- Dali River, a river in Taichung
- Dali Village
  - Dali, Dali, a village in Dali, Taichung
  - Dali, Toucheng, a village in Toucheng, Yilan

== People ==
=== People with the surname ===
- Athanase Dali (born 1967), Ivorian rugby union player
- Bikash Lal Dali (born 1980), Nepalese cricketer
- Gala Dalí (1894–1982), model, Salvador Dalí's wife
- Gizela Dali (1937–2010), Greek actress
- Kenza Dali (born 1991), French footballer
- Salvador Dalí (1904–1989), Spanish surrealist artist
- Sudiat Dali (born 1962), Singaporean footballer

=== People with the given name ===
- Dali Fatnassi, Tunisian shotputter, Athletics at the 2012 Summer Paralympics – Men's shot put
- Dali Jazi (1942–2007), Tunisian politician, jurist, and political scientist
- Wang Dali (born 1968), Chinese Olympic swimmer
- Dali Yang (born 1964), American political science professor
- Zhang Dali (born 1963), Chinese artist in Beijing
- Dali Benssalah (born 1992), French-Algerian actor
- Dalí (footballer), Equatoguinean footballer

== Transport ==
=== Rail ===
- Dali railway station (disambiguation), several railway stations

== See also ==
- Ad Dali', capital town of Ad Dali' Governorate, Yemen
- Dalai Lama, religious leader
- Dalli (disambiguation)
- Salvador Dalí (disambiguation)
