= King del Rap =

Studio album by Marracash
- Released: 31 October 2011
- Recorded: 2011
- Genre: Hip hop
- Length: 60:17
- Language: Italian
- Label: Universal Music Group
- Producer: Don Joe; Deleterio; Geeno; Medeline; The Buildzer; DJ Tayone

Marracash chronology
Fino a qui tutto bene (2010)	King del Rap (2011)	Status (2015)

Singles from King del Rap
- 1. "King del rap" Released: September 7, 2011; 2. "Didinò" Released: December 2, 2011; 3. "Sabbie mobili" Released: March 30, 2012; 4. "Giusto un giro" Released: June 19, 2012

King del Rap is the third studio album by Italian rapper Marracash, released on 31 October 2011 by Universal Music Group. It was also released in a deluxe version, including the street album Roccia Music II and several bonus tracks. The first single is the title track "King del Rap".

The album was certified gold by the Federation of the Italian Music Industry.

== Track listing ==
King del rap – Standard track listing
No.	Title	Lyrics	Music	Producer(s)	Length
1.	"King del rap"	Fabio Rizzo	Piermarco Gianotti	Deleterio	4:00
2.	"Didinò"	Rizzo	Luigi Florio	Don Joe	3:32
3.	"Semtex" (featuring Attila)	Rizzo; Davide Musca	Rémi Tobbal; Guillaume Silvestri	Medeline	3:47
4.	"In faccia"	Rizzo	Florio	Don Joe	3:36
5.	"Rapper/criminale"	Rizzo	Guido Parisi	Geeno	4:00
6.	"Giusto un giro" (featuring Emis Killa)	Florio; Emiliano Giambelli	Tobbal; Silvestri	Medeline	4:23
7.	"Noi no" (featuring Co'Sang)	Rizzo; Luca Imprudente; Antonio Riccardi	Florio	Don Joe	4:37
8.	"S.e.n.i.c.a.r." (featuring Guè)	Rizzo; Cosimo Fini	Gianotti	Deleterio	3:25
9.	"Sabbie mobili"	Rizzo	Alan Parsons; Eric Woolfson	Medeline	4:17
10.	"Quando sarò morto..." (featuring Fabri Fibra and Jake La Furia)	Rizzo; Fabrizio Tarducci; Francesco Vigorelli	Florio	Don Joe	3:55
11.	"Né cura né luogo" (featuring Salmo)	Rizzo; Maurizio Pisciottu	Gianotti	Deleterio	4:24
12.	"Prova a prendermi" (featuring Entics)	Rizzo; Cristiano Zuncheddu	Florio	Don Joe	3:46
13.	"...Quando ero vivo" (featuring J-Ax)	Rizzo; Alessandro Aleotti	Tobbal; Silvestri	Medeline	4:01
14.	"In down"	Rizzo	Gianotti	Deleterio	3:36
15.	"Marrageddon" (featuring Salmo)	Rizzo; Pisciottu	Flavio Morana	The Buildzer	4:58

King del rap – iTunes edition bonus track
No.	Title	Lyrics	Music	Producer(s)	Length
16.	"Fotoromanzo"	Rizzo	Gianotti	Deleterio	2:30

== Charts ==
Chart (2011)	Peak position
Italian Albums (FIMI)	3

== Certifications ==
Certifications for King del Rap
Region	Certification	Certified units/sales
Italy (FIMI)	2× Platinum	400,000^{‡}
^{‡} Sales+streaming figures based on certification alone.
