= List of number-one hits of 2013 (Italy) =

This is a list of the number-one hits of 2013 on FIMI's Italian Singles and Albums Charts.

Week	Issue date	Song	Artist	Ref.	Album	Artist	Ref.
1	7 January	"Scream & Shout"	will.i.am featuring Britney Spears		Backup 1987–2012	Jovanotti	
2	14 January	"Scream & Shout"	will.i.am featuring Britney Spears		Inno	Gianna Nannini	
3	21 January	"L'uomo più semplice"	Vasco Rossi		Inno	Gianna Nannini	
4	28 January	"I Follow Rivers"	Lykke Li		Sun	Mario Biondi	
5	4 February	"I Follow Rivers"	Lykke Li		Guerra e pace	Fabri Fibra	
6	11 February	"L'essenziale"	Marco Mengoni		Gioia	Modà	
7	18 February	"L'essenziale"	Marco Mengoni		Gioia	Modà	
8	25 February	"L'essenziale"	Marco Mengoni		Gioia	Modà	
9	4 March	"L'essenziale"	Marco Mengoni		Sig. Brainwash – L'arte di accontentare	Fedez	
10	11 March	"L'essenziale"	Marco Mengoni		Amo – Capitolo I	Renato Zero	
11	18 March	"L'essenziale"	Marco Mengoni		#prontoacorrere	Marco Mengoni	
12	25 March	"L'essenziale"	Marco Mengoni		Delta Machine	Depeche Mode	
13	1 April	"L'essenziale"	Marco Mengoni		Midnite	Salmo	
14	8 April	"Just Give Me a Reason"	Pink featuring Nate Ruess		Schiena	Emma	
15	15 April	"Just Give Me a Reason"	Pink featuring Nate Ruess		Schiena	Emma	
16	22 April	"Get Lucky"	Daft Punk featuring Pharrell Williams		Schiena	Emma	
17	29 April	"Get Lucky"	Daft Punk featuring Pharrell Williams		Schiena	Emma	
18	6 May	"Get Lucky"	Daft Punk featuring Pharrell Williams		L'album biango	Elio e le Storie Tese	
19	13 May	"Get Lucky"	Daft Punk featuring Pharrell Williams		Stecca	Moreno	
20	20 May	"Get Lucky"	Daft Punk featuring Pharrell Williams		Random Access Memories	Daft Punk	
21	27 May	"Get Lucky"	Daft Punk featuring Pharrell Williams		Stecca	Moreno	
22	3 June	"Get Lucky"	Daft Punk featuring Pharrell Williams		Stecca	Moreno	
23	10 June	"Get Lucky"	Daft Punk featuring Pharrell Williams		Stecca	Moreno	
24	17 June	"Get Lucky"	Daft Punk featuring Pharrell Williams		Stecca	Moreno	
25	24 June	"Get Lucky"	Daft Punk featuring Pharrell Williams		Stecca	Moreno	
26	1 July	"Get Lucky"	Daft Punk featuring Pharrell Williams		Stecca	Moreno	
27	8 July	"La La La"	Naughty Boy featuring Sam Smith		Stecca	Moreno	
28	15 July	"Wake Me Up!"	Avicii		Max 20	Max Pezzali	
29	22 July	"Wake Me Up!"	Avicii		Max 20	Max Pezzali	
30	29 July	"Wake Me Up!"	Avicii		Max 20	Max Pezzali	
31	5 August	"Wake Me Up!"	Avicii		Backup 1987–2012	Jovanotti	
32	12 August	"Wake Me Up!"	Avicii		Backup 1987–2012	Jovanotti	
33	19 August	"Wake Me Up!"	Avicii		Backup 1987–2012	Jovanotti	
34	26 August	"Wake Me Up!"	Avicii		Backup 1987–2012	Jovanotti	
35	2 September	"Wake Me Up!"	Avicii		Backup 1987–2012	Jovanotti	
36	9 September	"Limpido"	Laura Pausini and Kylie Minogue		Nuvola numero nove	Samuele Bersani	
37	16 September	"Wake Me Up!"	Avicii		Déjà Vu	Negrita	
38	23 September	"Wake Me Up!"	Avicii		Amore puro	Alessandra Amoroso	
39	30 September	"Wake Me Up!"	Avicii		Amore puro	Alessandra Amoroso	
40	7 October	"Wake Me Up!"	Avicii		Amore puro	Alessandra Amoroso	
41	14 October	"Cambia-menti"	Vasco Rossi		L'anima vola	Elisa	
42	21 October	"Royals"	Lorde		Mercurio	Emis Killa	
43	28 October	"Burn"	Ellie Goulding		Amo – Capitolo II	Renato Zero	
44	4 November	"Stardust"	Mika featuring Chiara		Senza paura	Giorgia	
45	11 November	"Stardust"	Mika featuring Chiara		20 – The Greatest Hits	Laura Pausini	
46	18 November	"Stardust"	Mika featuring Chiara		20 – The Greatest Hits	Laura Pausini	
47	25 November	"Let Her Go"	Passenger		Mondovisione	Ligabue	
48	2 December	"Ordinary Love"	U2		Mondovisione	Ligabue	
49	9 December	"La vita e la felicità"	Michele Bravi		Mondovisione	Ligabue	
50	16 December	"Stardust"	Mika featuring Chiara		Mondovisione	Ligabue	
51	23 December	"Stardust"	Mika featuring Chiara		Mondovisione	Ligabue	
52	30 December	"Jubel"	Klingande		Mondovisione	Ligabue	

== See also ==
- 2013 in music
- List of number-one hits in Italy
