= Santeria (album) =

Studio album by Marracash and Guè
- Released: June 24, 2016
- Recorded: 2016
- Genre: Gangsta rap; trap
- Length: 55:51
- Label: Universal
- Producer: Shablo; Don Joe; Mark Hiroshima; Marz; Zef; Charlie Charles; Mace; Deleterio; 2nd Roof; Pherro; Banf

Marracash chronology
Status (2015)	Santeria (2016)	Persona (2019)

Guè Pequeno chronology
Vero (2015)	Santeria (2016)	Gentleman (2017)

Singles from Santeria
- 1. "Nulla accade" Released: June 7, 2016; 2. "Insta lova" Released: July 15, 2016; 3. "Ninja" Released: November 15, 2016

Santeria is the first collaborative studio album by Italian rappers Marracash and Guè, released on June 24, 2016 by Universal Music Group. As longtime friends, the album serves as a follow-up to some underground joint mixtapes and a series of collaborative songs on their respective albums.

== Background ==
On January 4, 2016, through social networks, the two rappers have revealed their intention to make an album together; in the past, Marracash and Guè Pequeno have worked together on various songs, including Fattore wow (in the album Marracash 2008), Big! and Brivido (present respectively in the albums Il ragazzo d'oro and Bravo ragazzo by Pequeno).

The album was recorded in Tenerife, Trancoso and Milan. The on June 7, the two rappers revealed the cover of the album, made by the Colombian visual artist Armando Mesìas, and also the title and the track list of the album.

== Music and production ==
During an interview Guè Pequeno revealed that the album was designed to be "a real hip-hop record, with a very black sound, being culturally of high level, not something done to chase the Italian mainstream or the fads". The production of the album spaces from trap to old school beats, and it was praised for having an international sound, mixing various ages of hip hop.

== Lyrics and themes ==
In the album there are several songs that tell directly the vision of the life and music of the two rappers, having at the same time ironic and soft songs that, with a lucid and sharp criticism, criticize today's social and musical aspects. Among the topics covered are more disaffection among young people, the different faces of success and false ideals to which it sells off the art.

== Track listing ==
Santeria – Standard track listing
No.	Title	Lyrics	Music	Producer(s)	Length
1.	"Santeria"	Cosimo Fini; Fabio Rizzo	Pablo Miguel Lombroni Capalbo; Luigi Florio	Shablo	1:33
2.	"Money"	Fini; Rizzo	Florio; Marco Della Riva	Don Joe; Mark Hiroshima	3:30
3.	"Nulla accade"	Fini; Rizzo	Alessandro Pulga; Rizzo	Marz	3:52
4.	"Senza Dio"	Fini; Rizzo	Stefano Tognini	Zef	3:39
5.	"Salvador Dalí"	Fini; Rizzo	Paolo Alberto Monachetti; Fini	Charlie Charles	4:05
6.	"Cosa mia"	Fini; Rizzo	Simone Benussi; Rizzo	MACE	4:05
7.	"Purdi"	Fini; Rizzo	Florio; Della Riva	Don Joe; Mark Hiroshima	3:21
8.	"Cantante italiana"	Fini; Rizzo; Piermarco Gianotti	Rizzo; Gianotti	Deleterio	3:35
9.	"Insta Lova"	Fini; Rizzo	Pietro Miano; Federico Vaccari; Marco Zangirolami; Fini	2nd Roof	3:26
10.	"Maledetto me"	Fini; Rizzo	Miano; Vaccari; Rizzo	2nd Roof	3:20
11.	"Scooteroni"	Fini; Rizzo	Samuele Masia	Pherro	3:59
12.	"Tony"	Fini; Rizzo	Miano; Vaccari; Rizzo	2nd Roof	4:40
13.	"Quasi amici"	Fini; Rizzo	Mattia Cutolo; Rizzo	Banf	4:51
14.	"Film senza volume"	Rizzo	Lombroni Capalbo	Shablo	4:01
15.	"Erba & WiFi"	Fini; Rizzo	Lombroni Capalbo; Federica Abbate; Massimiliano Cellamaro; Gianotti	Shablo	3:54

Santeria: Voodoo Edition – International deluxe edition bonus tracks
No.	Title	Lyrics	Music	Producer(s)	Length
1.	"Ninja"	Fini; Rizzo	Massimiliano Dagani; Maurizio Bonizzoni; Cellamaro; Daniele Macchi	Big Fish	3:42
2.	"Cashmere"	Fini; Rizzo	Florio; Antonio Lago	Don Joe; Yung Snapp	3:39
3.	"Piazza rossa"	Fini; Rizzo	Sebastiano Lo Iacono; Rizzo	Big Joe	3:37
4.	"Scooteroni RMX" (featuring Sfera Ebbasta)	Fini; Rizzo; Gionata Boschetti	Masia	Pherro	4:32
5.	"Purdi RMX" (featuring Fabri Fibra)	Fini; Rizzo; Fabrizio Tarducci	Florio; Della Riva	Don Joe; Mark Hiroshima	4:13
6.	"Senza Dio RMX" (featuring Luchè)	Fini; Rizzo; Luca Imprudente	Tognini	Zef	4:24

== Charts ==
Chart (2016)	Peak position
Italian Albums (FIMI)	1
Swiss Albums (Schweizer Hitparade)	12

== Certifications ==
Region	Certification	Certified units/sales
Italy (FIMI)	5× Platinum	250,000^{‡}
^{‡} Sales+streaming figures based on certification alone.
