= Dalli =

Dalli may refer to:

== Places ==
- Dallı, Aşkale
- Dalli Rajhara, a city and a municipality, Durg district, Chhattisgarh State, India
- Dalli, Tanout, a former town in Tanout District, Zinder Region, Niger

== Other uses ==
- Dalli (surname)

== See also ==
- Dali (disambiguation)
- DALI (disambiguation)
