= Marracash (album) =

Studio album by Marracash
- Released: 13 June 2008
- Recorded: 2007–2008
- Genre: Hip hop
- Length: 65:18
- Language: Italian
- Label: Universal Music Group
- Producer: Don Joe; Deleterio

Marracash chronology
Marracash (2008)	Fino a qui tutto bene (2010)

Singles from Marracash
- 1. "Badabum Cha Cha" Released: April 18, 2008; 2. "Estate in città" Released: September 2, 2008; 3. "Non confondermi" Released: October 24, 2008; 4. "Tutto questo" Released: February 2, 2009

Marracash is the self-titled debut studio album by Italian rapper Marracash. It was released on 13 June 2008 in Italy, where its peak position was #11. The album was produced by Don Joe & Deleterio and the featured guests are J Ax, Club Dogo, Vincenzo da Via Anfossi and Co'Sang. The first single from the album, "Badabum Cha Cha", peaked at number 9 on FIMI.

== Chart performance ==
The album charted for 22 weeks on the Italian Albums Chart. It entered the chart at number 14 in week 25 of 2008, and its last appearance was on week 36 of 2008. It peaked at number nine, where it stayed for one week.

== Track listing ==
Marracash – Standard track listing
No.	Title	Writer(s)	Length
1.	"Tutto questo"	Fabio Rizzo; Luigi Florio	4:09
2.	"Badabum Cha Cha"	Rizzo; Piermarco Gianotti	3:33
3.	"Dritto al punto"	Rizzo; Gianotti	3:08
4.	"Chiedi alla polvere 2008"	Rizzo; Florio	4:25
5.	"La danza della pioggia"	Rizzo; Gianotti	3:59
6.	"Solo io e te" (featuring Jenny B)	Rizzo; Giovanna Bersola; Florio	4:07
7.	"Fattore wow" (featuring Gué Pequeno & J-Ax)	Rizzo; Cosimo Fini; Alessandro Aleotti; Florio	3:15
8.	"Quello che deve arrivare (Arriva arriva)" (featuring Vincenzo da Via Anfossi & Jake La Furia)	Rizzo; Vincenzo De Cesare; Francesco Vigorelli; Florio; Filippo Carmeni	3:49
9.	"Triste ma vero" (featuring Co'Sang)	Rizzo; Luca Imprudente; Antonio Riccardi; Gianotti	3:30
10.	"Bastavano le briciole"	Rizzo; Florio	3:53
11.	"Estate in città"	Rizzo; Florio; Gianotti; Vasco Rossi	2:45
12.	"Sì sì con la testa"	Rizzo; Gianotti	4:03
13.	"L'ultima settimana"	Rizzo; Gianotti	3:23
14.	"Fatti un giro nel quartiere"	Rizzo; Gianotti	2:35
15.	"Trappole"	Rizzo; Gianotti	3:35

Marracash: Golden Edition – bonus tracks
No.	Title	Writer(s)	Length
3.	"Non confondermi"	Rizzo; Gianotti	3:50
17.	"La via di Carlito"	Rizzo; Florio	4:10
18.	"La mia prigione"	Rizzo; Florio	3:01

Marracash - 10 anni dopo (Inediti e rarità) – Tenth anniversary edition bonus tracks
No.	Title	Writer(s)	Length
1.	"Business class" (featuring Rkomi)	Rizzo; Mirko Martorana; Gianluca Cranco	3:07
2.	"Valentino"	Rizzo; Giovanni Loddo	3:02
3.	"Popolare 2018"	Rizzo; Florio	3:35
4.	"Nuovo papa 2018"	Rizzo; Gianotti	2:44
5.	"Non confondermi RMX" (featuring Fabri Fibra)	Rizzo; Fabrizio Tarducci; Gianotti	4:40
6.	"Badabum Cha Cha" (Dogozilla Remix)	Rizzo; Gianotti	3:24
7.	"Myspace Freestyle 2008"	Rizzo; Florio	3:20
8.	"Con i soldi in testa"	Rizzo; Matteo Bernacchi; Matteo Podini	3:38

== Charts ==
Chart (2008)	Peak position
Italian Albums (FIMI)	9
