= Le Visage de l'amour =

Studio album by Dalida
- Released: 1986
- Recorded: 1983–1986
- Genres: World; pop; new wave; adult contemporary
- Labels: Orlando International Shows; Carrere

Dalida chronology
Dali (1984)	Le Visage de l'amour (1986)

Le Visage de l'amour (The Face of Love) is the last album Dalida released a year before her death. It was also her first album to be made as a CD format. The title reprises the phrase usually used by Dalida to describe her public and her fans, which had been picked up by the big French artist Charles Trenet who decided to write a song for Dalida bearing this name.

Dalida didn't promote the album like she used to do for her former releases, appearing only for a week of promotion on French TV. Subsequently, the album failed to chart upon its release but did chart right after Dalida's death in 1987 entering the top 20 for 2 weeks. The album is a collection of rather moody to sad songs while containing a dance number called "Mama Caraïbo" and that was later disregarded by Dalida herself who didn't like the song quality. Two singles of the album were already released and heavily promoted in 1985 but failed to chart. Another 2 songs were released and poorly promoted upon the outing of the album but the whole project was a little neglected due to Dalida filming and releasing the most important movie of her career, a picture by Egyptian director Youssef Chahine called Le sixième jour. This movie earned huge positive reviews from movie critics all over the world praising Dalida's performance but the movie was not a commercial success. Nevertheless, this movie remains a strong proof of Dalida's acting talent and a great addition to her legacy.

== Track listing ==
1. Parce que je ne t'aime plus
2. La Danse de Zorba
3. Le Visage de l'amour
4. Le Vénitien de Lavallois
5. Mama Caraïbo
6. Les Hommes de ma vie
7. Salut salaud
8. Semplicemente così
9. Le Temps d'aimer
10. Mourir sur scène

== Track listing (1986 CD compilation version) ==
1. Pour te dire je t'aime
2. C'était mon ami
3. Les Hommes de ma vie
4. Semplicemente così
5. Parce que je ne t'aime plus
6. Kalimba de luna
7. Salut salaud
8. Lucas
9. La Danse de Zorba
10. Le Visage de l'amour
11. Le Vénitien de Lavallois
12. Mama Caraïbo
13. Le Temps d'aimer
14. Reviens-moi
15. Akhsan nass

== Singles ==
=== Album singles ===
- 1985 Le Temps d'aimer / Le Vénitien de Levallois

This double sided single was released in 1985 to secure Dalida's presence on French Television. Dalida promoted the singles through all her TV appearances in the second half of the year 1985.

- 1986 Parce que je ne t'aime plus / Salut salaud

Poorly promoted, this double sided single didn't gain much commercial success and this was also the reason why the album failed to chart upon its release.

=== Non-album singles ===
- 1986 Le sixième jour / (instrumental version)

Upon release of the movie of the same name, Dalida went on to promote her movie and performed the song on various TV shows during that period. Dalida's last TV appearance in February 1987 was to perform a live rendition of this title.

- 1987 Pour en arriver là / Les Hommes de ma vie

"Les Hommes de ma vie" like "Pour en arriver là" was released as a postmortem single due to its biographical natural. The beautiful song sums up the tragic love life of Dalida and describes that she ended up alone with the public as her only source of love.

== Charts ==
France album charts : #20 (2 weeks, 1987)
