= Dalip =

Dalip is a given name. Notable people with the name include:

- Dalip Frashëri, 19th century Albanian Bektashi sheikh and bejtexhi
- Dalip Mehta, retired Indian diplomat
- Dalip Rana (born 1972), Indian professional wrestler and wrestling
- Dalip Singh (athlete) (born 1899), Indian track and field athlete
- Dalip Singh (gymnastics coach) (1932–1987), Indian gymnastics coach from Haryana
- Dalip Singh Rana, (born 1972), Indian actor and professional wrestler, known as The Great Khali
- Dalip Singh Saund (1899–1973), member of the United States House of Representatives
- Dalip Singh Sukerchakia (Maharaja Dalip Singh) GCSI (1838–1893), the last Maharaja of Sikh Raj
- Dalip Tahil (born 1952), Indian film, television and theatre actor
- Dalip Kaur Tiwana, novelist and short-story writer of contemporary Punjabi literature
- Dalip Kumar Upreti (born 1958), Indian lichenologist

== See also ==
- Dali (disambiguation)
- Dilip (disambiguation)
