= Noi, loro, gli altri =

Studio album by Marracash
- Released: 19 November 2021
- Genre: Alternative hip hop; conscious hip hop
- Length: 42:51
- Label: Island
- Producer: Marz; Dumbo Gets Mad; Granato; Michelangelo; Zef

Marracash chronology
Persona (2019)	Noi, loro, gli altri (2021)	È finita la pace (2024)

Singles from Noi, loro, gli altri
- 1. "Crazy Love" Released: November 19, 2021; 2. "Laurea ad honorem" Released: March 4, 2022; 3. "Importante" Released: December 9, 2022

Noi, loro, gli altri (stylized in all caps) is the sixth studio album by Italian rapper Marracash, released on 19 November 2021 by Island Records. The album was at the top of the ranking of the 20 best Italian records of the year drawn up by the Rolling Stone Italia.

The album has also been certified six times platinum in Italy by FIMI. Almost all the tracks from the album were also certified by FIMI. "Loro", "Pagliaccio", "Io", "Cosplayer", "Dubbi", "Laurea ad honorem" (with Calcutta) and "Nemesi" (with Blanco) were certified Gold, while "Love" (with Gué) and "Crazy Love" were certified Platinum.

== Background ==
The arrival of a new recording project after Persona was announced in January 2021, on the occasion of the rapper's participation in the Radio Deejay show Say Waaad?. The record is the result of a three-month home isolation.

In November of the same year, the Italian edition of Rolling Stone magazine published an issue focused on Marracash, carrying out an interview with the artist. Inside there are also interventions by other artists such as Gué Pequeno and Elodie who talked about the rapper and in addition the future album is also mentioned, when, however, the title or release date had not been officially announced.

The release of the album, which took place on November 19, was announced by surprise through his social networks on 17 November 2021.

== Description ==
As explained by Marracash himself, the title of the album (translated as "Us, them, the others") "tells the moment: we are a fragmented society, divided into teams and factions, each with its own truth. The right to identity is claimed, and in the cases of sexual identity, for example, I find it absolutely right, and at the same time the overview is lost". The album features three covers: "Noi" is the main one, while "Loro" and "Gli Altri" have been made available exclusively in the limited edition LP version. On the first cover, Marracash poses alongside some characters, mostly members of her family, including Elodie and her manager, Paola Zukar; in the second, the rapper is inside the Universal offices in Milan with his staff; in the last cover he finds himself immersed in a crowd turned from behind, in the opposite direction to that of the artist.

Some of the fourteen pieces that make up the disc feature samples, while others feature the participation of various guest artists, however not explicitly accredited on the back. "Pagliaccio" contains a fragment of the lyrical aria "Vesti la giubba" performed by Mario Del Monaco and taken from the opera Pagliacci by Ruggero Leoncavallo. "Love" and "Io" contain samples of Guru Josh's "Infinity" and Vasco Rossi's "Gli angeli", respectively. "Crazy Love" contains the uncredited vocal participation of singers Elodie and Mahmood, "Cosplayer" contains a sampling of "Honeybee" by New Birth and features the uncredited vocal participation by Salmo and Joan Thiele, the latter also present in "Noi". The interlude "Noi, loro, gli altri (Skit)" features the uncredited vocal participation of rapper Fabri Fibra and a sampling of "Maleducato" by Dumbo Gets Mad, "Gli altri (giorni stupidi)" contains samples of the songs "Stupid Days" by Rokas and EDONiCo and "Makes You Fly" by Dumbo Gets Mad and "Dumbo Gets Mad Skit" is taken from the track Misanthropulsar by Dumbo Gets Mad. The final piece "Cliffhanger" contains a fragment from the Ballabile (second scene of Act II of the Aida) by Giuseppe Verdi.

== Promotion ==
The first single from the disc is "Crazy Love", accompanied by a music video distributed on YouTube to coincide with the release of the song, on 19 November 2021; it shows the rapper and Elodie during a duel to the death.

On February 24, 2022, the rapper made available the video for the third track "Infinity Love". On March 4 it was released the video for the second single "Laurea ad honorem", in collaboration with Calcutta.

== Track listing ==
Noi, loro, gli altri – Standard track listing
No.	Title	Lyrics	Music	Producer(s)	Length
1.	"Loro"	Fabio Rizzo	Alessandro Pulga; Stefano Tognini	Marz; Zef	3:18
2.	"Pagliaccio"	Rizzo; Ruggero Leoncavallo	Pulga; Tognini	Marz; Zef	2:57
3.	"∞ Love" (featuring Guè)	Rizzo; Cosimo Fini	Pulga; Tognini; Paul Walden	Marz; Zef	3:38
4.	"Io"	Rizzo; Davide Petrella; Vasco Rossi	Pulga; Tognini; Tullio Ferro	Marz; Zef	3:15
5.	"Crazy Love"	Rizzo	Pulga; Tognini	Marz; Zef	3:12
6.	"Cosplayer"	Rizzo	Pulga; Tognini	Marz; Zef	3:41
7.	"Dubbi"	Rizzo	Pulga; Tognini	Marz; Zef	3:54
8.	"Laurea ad honorem" (featuring Calcutta)	Rizzo; Edoardo D'Erme	Pulga; Tognini	Marz; Zef	3:15
9.	"Noi"	Rizzo	Pulga; Tognini	Marz; Zef	4:32
10.	"Noi, loro, gli altri (Skit)"	Fabrizio Tarducci	Luca Bergomi	Dumbo Gets Mad	0:55
11.	"Gli altri (giorni stupidi)"	Rizzo; Alberto Sanlazzaro; Nicolò Anese; Luca Bergomi	Pulga; Tognini; Alessandro Benzi; Gianluca Marangon; Bergomi; Tommaso Fagotto	Granato; Marz; Zef	3:21
12.	"Nemesi" (featuring Blanco)	Rizzo; Riccardo Fabbriconi; Petrella	Pulga; Tognini; Michele Zocca	Marz; Zef; Michelangelo	2:55
13.	"Dumbo Gets Mad (Skit)"		Bergomi	Dumbo Gets Mad	0:27
14.	"Cliffhanger"	Rizzo	Pulga; Tognini; Giuseppe Verdi	Marz; Zef	3:25

Noi, loro, gli altri – Digital edition bonus track
No.	Title	Lyrics	Music	Producer(s)	Length
1.	"Importante"	Rizzo; Cristiano Malgioglio	Pulga; Tognini; Alberto Anelli	Marz; Zef	3:21

== Charts ==
=== Weekly charts ===
Weekly chart performance for Noi, loro, gli altri
Chart (2021)	Peak position
Italian Albums (FIMI)	1
Swiss Albums (Schweizer Hitparade)	16

=== Year-end charts ===
Chart	Year	Position
Italian Albums (FIMI)	2021	7
Italian Albums (FIMI)	2022	4
Italian Albums (FIMI)	2023	16
Italian Albums (FIMI)	2024	33
Italian Albums (FIMI)	2025	31

== Certifications ==
Certifications for Noi, loro, gli altri
Region	Certification	Certified units/sales
Italy (FIMI)	8× Platinum	400,000^{‡}
^{‡} Sales+streaming figures based on certification alone.

== Year-end lists ==
Select year-end rankings of Noi, loro, gli altri
Publication	List	Rank	Ref.
la Repubblica	The Best Italian Albums of 2021	3	
Rolling Stone	The 20 Best Italian Albums of 2021	1	
