= Salvador Dalí (disambiguation) =

Salvador Dalí (1904–1989) was a Spanish surrealist.

Salvador Dalí may also refer to:

- Salvador Dalí (film), a 1966 film by Andy Warhol
- "Salvador Dalí" (song), a song by Marracash and Guè Pequeno
- Salvador Dalí Desert, a desert in Bolivia
- Salvador Dalí Museum, a museum in Florida

== See also ==
- Dali (disambiguation)
