= Emis Killa discography =

Discography of Italian rapper Emis Killa

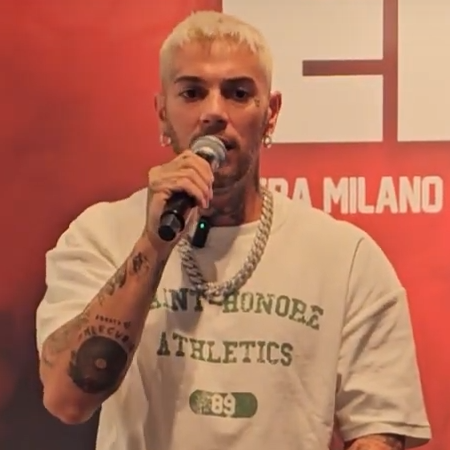
- Emis Killa in 2024
- Studio albums: 7
- Singles: 12
- Music videos: 28

The following is the discography of Italian rapper Emis Killa.

== Studio albums ==
List of studio albums, with chart positions and certifications
Title	Album details	Peak chart positions	Certifications
Title	Album details	ITA	Certifications
L'erba cattiva	Released: 24 January 2012; Label: Carosello; Format: CD, digital download, streaming	4	FIMI: Platinum
Mercurio	Released: 22 October 2013; Label: Carosello; Format: CD, digital download, streaming	1	FIMI: Platinum
Terza stagione	Released: 14 October 2016; Label: Carosello; Format: CD, digital download, streaming	1	FIMI: Platinum
Supereroe	Released: 12 October 2018; Label: Carosello; Format: CD, digital download, streaming	1	FIMI: Platinum
17 (with Jake La Furia)	Released: 18 September 2020; Label: Epic; Format: CD, digital download, streaming	1	FIMI: 3× Platinum
Effetto notte	Released: 19 May 2023; Label: Epic; Format: CD, digital download, streaming	1	
Musica triste	Released: 5 December 2025; Label: Epic; Format: CD, digital download, streaming	2	FIMI: Gold

== Mixtapes ==
Title	Album details
Keta Music	Released: 17 December 2009; Label: Blocco Recordz; Format: CD
Champagne e spine	Released: 11 October 2010; Label: Blocco Recordz; Format: CD
The Flow Clocker Vol. 1	Released: 2 April 2011; Label: Blocco Recordz; Format: CD
Keta Music Vol. 2	Released: 18 June 2015; Label: Carosello; Format: digital download
Keta Music Vol. 3	Released: 23 June 2011; Label: Sony Music; Format: digital download

== Extended plays ==
Title	Album details
Il peggiore	Released: 19 December 2011; Label: Carosello; Format: Digital download

== Singles ==
Year	Title	Album
2012	"Cashwoman"	L'erba cattiva
2012	"Parole di ghiaccio"	L'erba cattiva
2012	"Dietro front" (feat. Fabri Fibra)	L'erba cattiva
2012	"Giusto un giro" (feat. Marracash)	King del rap
2012	"Se il mondo fosse" (feat. J-Ax, Club Dogo, Marracash)	—
2012	"Il king"	L'erba cattiva - Gold Version
2013	"Scordarmi chi ero"	Mercurio
2013	"Killers"	—
2013	"A cena dai tuoi" (feat. J-Ax)	Mercurio
2014	"Essere umano" (feat. Skin)	Mercurio
2014	"Maracanã"	Mercurio – 5 Stars Edition

== Other charted songs ==
List of other charted songs, with chart positions
Title	Year	Peak chart positions	Album
Title	Year	ITA	Album
"Pacino (The Godfather)"	2023	45	Effetto notte
"On Fire (Paid in Full)" (with Sfera Ebbasta)	2023	1	Effetto notte
"Col cuore in gola (Lords of Dogtown)"	2023	21	Effetto notte
"Viscerale (Closer)"	2023	32	Effetto notte
"Maserati (The Wolf of Wall Street)"	2023	55	Effetto notte
"Lontano (Carlito's Way)" (with Neima Ezza)	2023	41	Effetto notte
"Albicocca (Lolita)" (with Gué)	2023	29	Effetto notte
"Big Bang (Upside Down)"	2023	34	Effetto notte
"Toxic (Trainspotting)"	2023	38	Effetto notte
"Sonny (City of God)"	2023	58	Effetto notte
"MC Drive (La Haine)" (with Ernia and Coez)	2023	49	Effetto notte
"Senz'anima (Nikita)" (with Lazza)	2023	14	Effetto notte
"Attori di strada (Ragazzi Fuori)"	2023	57	Effetto notte
"Bel finale (The Butterfly Effect)"	2023	79	Effetto notte
