= Marracash =

Italian rapper (born 1979)

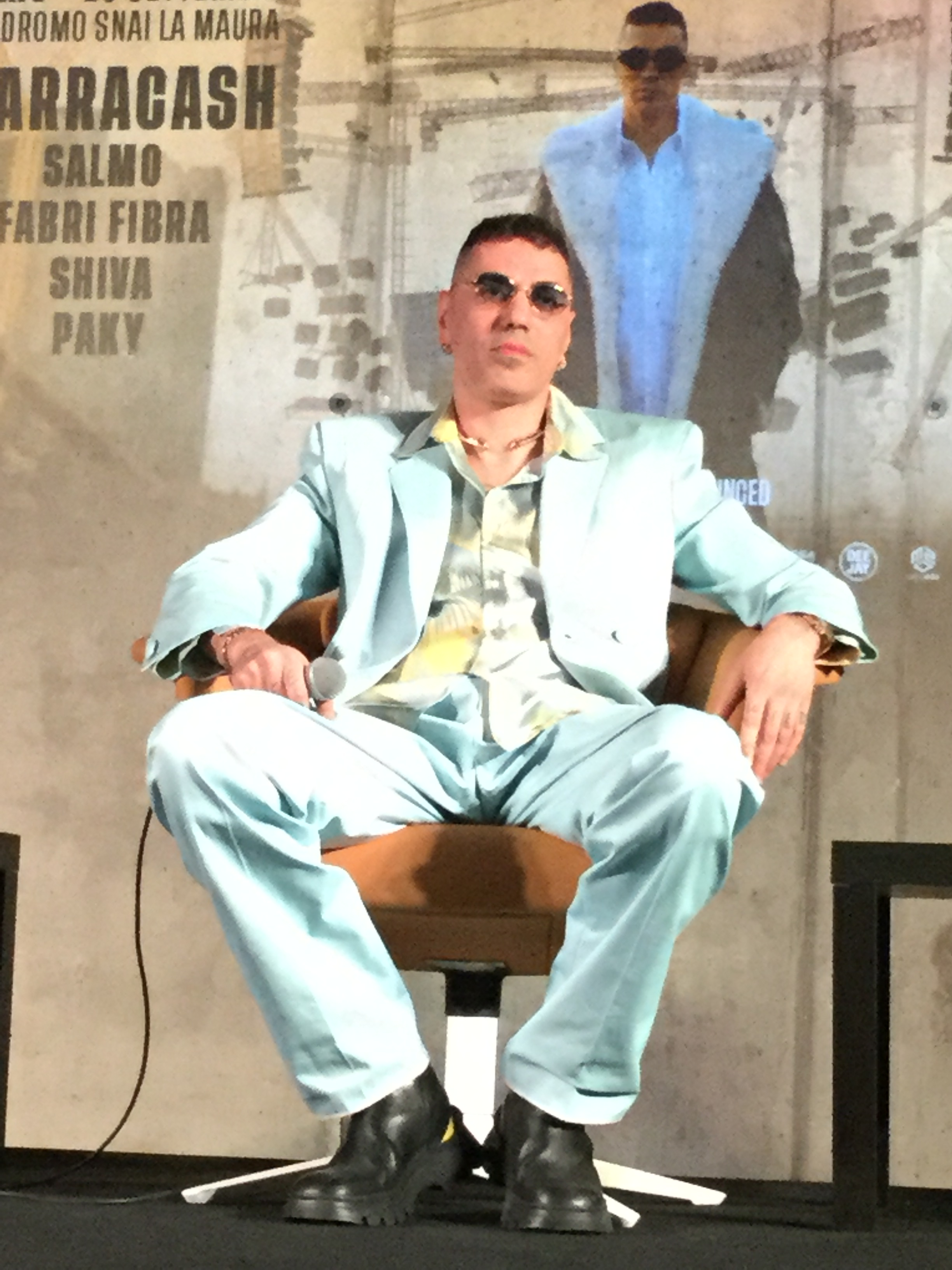
- Marracash in 2023

Background information
- Also known as: Yuza delle Nuvole
- Born: Fabio Bertolo Rizzo; 22 May 1979 (age 47)
- Origin: Nicosia, Sicily, Italy
- Genre: Hip hop
- Occupations: Rapper; songwriter
- Years active: 1999–present
- Label: Universal
- Website: marracash.it

Fabio Bartolo Rizzo (born 22 May 1979), known professionally as Marracash (Italian: [marraˈkɛʃ]), is an Italian rapper. Starting his career in the rap group Dogo Gang, he rose to fame as a solo artist in the 2010s. He released six studio albums that reached the top ten of the Italian Albums Chart, including two top positions with Santeria (2016) and Persona (2019). He has also released numerous singles and collaborations, seventeen of which reached the top ten of the Italian Singles Chart. He has sold over 5 million copies in Italy, becoming one of the top selling Italian rappers in the 2010s.

He has sung and written songs with numerous artists including rappers like Gué Pequeno, J-Ax, Fabri Fibra, Emis Killa, Club Dogo, Baby K, and pop-influenced artists such as Tiziano Ferro, Elisa, Giusy Ferreri, Federica Abbate and Elodie.

In 2013, together with producer Shablo, he founded the independent record label Roccia Music, which involves established figures and newcomers to rap, producers and DJs. From 2012 to 2014, he hosted MTV Italy's freestyle music TV program MTV Spit.

== Biography ==
Fabio Rizzo Bartolo was born in Nicosia, Sicily, Italy, to a mother who worked as a custodian and a father who worked as a truck driver. He has a younger brother. His family moved from Sicily to Milan in a house in Bramante; when he was ten, he was expelled from his home with his family, who moved to the suburbs of Barona, where he grew up and still lives.

After graduating as an electronical technician, Rizzo recorded his first verses under the pseudonym Yuza delle Nuvole, appearing on Prodigio's 1999 demo "The Royal Rumble", alongside Il Guercio, Fame, Aken and Corvo D'Argento. He adopted the stage name Marracash after his childhood nickname, Marocchino (Italian for 'Moroccan', jokingly because of his Sicilian origins), as a pun on the name of Marrakesh.

== Career ==
Marrakesh made his debut appearance in 2004 on the PMC VS Club Dogo mixtape, a collaboration between Club Dogo and the Massive Crew Portion. In the same year the collective Dogo Gang came into being. He also contributed to the Club Dogo album Regular and to Hashishinz Sound Vol. 1 by Gué Pequeno and Deleterio.

In 2005, under the Contagion Area label, Marracash released "Popolare", a single produced by Don Joe and made available for free download. The song anticipated the release of the mixtape Roccia Music I, in which the Dogo Gang (Club Dogo, Vincenzo da Via Anfossi, Deleterio and Ted Bundy) collaborated along with guests such as Inoki, Co'Sang, Rischio, Shablo, Misa and Royal Mehdi.

In June 2008, his first solo album Marracash was released by Universal Music. It reached number 9 on the Italian Albums Chart, receiving a gold certification. Gué Pequeno, J-Ax, Vincenzo da Via Anfossi and Jake La Furia made guest appearances. Two singles were released from the album: "Badabum Cha Cha", which becomes the singer's first top ten hit, and "Estate in città".

In 2009, he participated together with 55 other Italian singers on "Domani 21/04.2009", a charitable release to remember the victims of the 2009 L'Aquila earthquake. Towards the end of the year he released the song "Cani pazzi", ahead of his second album Fino a qui tutto bene, which came out on 13 July 2010. It included collaborations with Giusy Ferreri ("Rivincita") and Fabri Fibra ("Stupidi"). It met with less success than his previous album.

In September 2011, Marracash released the song "King of Rap", ahead of his eponymous album released in October. The album debuted at the number 3 on the FIMI chart, receiving platinum certification. Later in 2012 he released the collaboration "Giusto un giro" with Emis Killa and announced the launch of his own record label, La Roccia Music. On 22 December, Marracash presented the first episode of MTV Spit, a television program covering rap battles between artists of the underground scene.

He worked on the collective album Genesis with the artists of the Rock Music of 2013. On 20 January 2015, he released his fourth album Status, which reached number 2 on the Italian Albums Chart and 32 on the Swiss charts. From the album he released the single "Status", which peaked at number 2 on the Italian Singles Chart, "Senza un posto nel mondo" with Tiziano Ferro, "In radio", and "Niente canzoni d'amore" with Federica Abbate.

In June 2016 the rapper released a studio album with Gué Pequeno. Titled Santeria and comprising fifteen tracks, it became his first number one album. The forerunner single "Nulla accade", released on 7 June, was certified double platinum and reached number 16 on the Italian Singles Chart.

He released an album collecting his hits for the 10th anniversary of Marracash's release. On 12 June 2019, he released a collaboration with singer Elodie, "Margarita", which peaked at number 9 on the Singles Chart and sold over 100,000 copies in Italy. On 31 October 2019, Marracash released his sixth album, Persona. It peaked at number one on the FIMI Chart and received double platinum certification. It was supported by several hit singles, including "Marylean", with Salmo and Nitro, "Crudelia - I nervi" and the number one song" Supreme - L'ego". On 6 March 2020 he released a new track, "Neon - Le Ali", featuring the Italian songwriter Elisa, which peaked at number five on the Italian Singles Chart. In 2020 the rapper collaborated with Dardust on "Defuera" and the third lead single from Persona "Sport - I muscoli", which peaked at number three on the Italian chart.

On 17 November 2021, Marracash announced on Instagram a studio album Noi, loro, gli altri ("Us, Them, The Others"), which was released two days later. The album, consisting of fourteen tracks, was entirely produced by Zef and Marz and features three guests: Gué Pequeno, Calcutta and Blanco. The first track released from the album was "Crazy Love", which was accompanied by a music video starring his ex-girlfriend Elodie.

On 13 December 2024, Marracash released another album È finita la pace. It features a song with the same title as the album, which became a certified Gold track by the end of 2024 and currently sits at Double Platinum. The track was written entirely by Marracash and was produced by his trusted associates Marz and Zef. With the release of È finita la pace, certain critics have described Marracash as having his own genre: the "Marracash genre." The album was nominated for the Rockol Awards 2025. The album has been described as dark, one that "absorbs truth and spits it out" while also being a true and personal manifesto in an age where copy-and-paste models of music and industrial productions predominate.

== Music influences and style ==
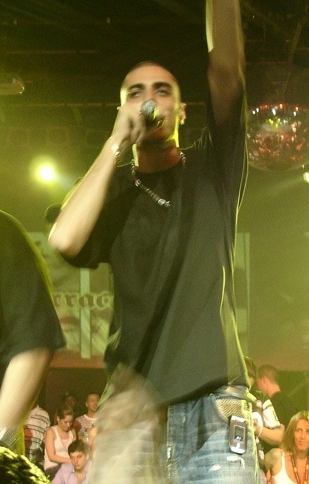
Marracash performing in 2007

In an interview with AllMusic in July 2008, Marracash said he regularly listened to Metallica and 883 as a child. He takes inspiration from American artists such as Jay-Z, Drake, Kanye West, DJ Khaled, Nas, Kendrick Lamar and Wu-Tang Clan. From Italy, he cites Frankie Hi-NRG MC.

Marracash described his writing and writing process for the 2019 album Persona in an interview with Rolling Stone Italy: "It develops over time, in the sense that I mature stuff, it's something I do on an introspective level, I do it without writing. I just take notes and then at a certain point I throw them out, and when I started writing the pieces flowed out like blood from a wound." He then describes his feelings and the way he analyzes the situations he reports in the texts: "I exercise a constant self-consciousness that leads me to experience emotions very intensely. [...] But each time I tend to pull the rope a bit to its extreme and it is perhaps also a way to feel alive, a search for adrenaline, because in the end I detach myself enough to find them stronger than before."

== Criticism and controversy ==
In 2006, when Marracash criticized Nesli's way of rapping through the song "Popular", a rivalry between the two began. The following year, in fact, Nesli responded to Marracash with the song "Life is just one", accusing him of making neighborhood rhymes and being a chatterbox. Marracash's response came in 2008 with the song "Dritto al punto", in which he reversed the quotations made by the opposing rapper, who replied with "Riot", closing the debate.

On 14 January 2017, six months after the release of Santeria, Marracash and Gué Pequeno gave an interview to Corriere della Sera, in which they criticized the musical style adopted by their colleagues Fedez and J-Ax, ahead of the release of their studio album Comunisti col Rolex. Fedez responded by accusing the two rappers of criticizing them to achieve visibility, as well as calling Marracash a coward for not meeting him during Moschino's fashion show. Marracash, referring to Fedez as a "dwarf with Napoleon complex", denied Fedez's claim.

== Personal life ==
Between 2019 and 2021, the rapper was in a relationship with singer Elodie.

== Discography ==
=== Studio albums ===
List of studio albums, with chart positions and certifications
Title	Album details	Peak chart positions		Certifications
Title	Album details	ITA	SWI	Certifications
Marracash	Released: 13 June 2008; Label: Universal; Format: CD, digital download	9	—	FIMI: Gold
Fino a qui tutto bene	Released: 13 July 2010; Label: Universal; Format: CD, digital download	7	—	FIMI: Gold
King del Rap	Released: 31 October 2011; Label: Universal; Format: CD, digital download, streaming	3	—	FIMI: 2× Platinum
Status	Released: 20 January 2015; Label: Universal; Format: CD, digital download	2	32	FIMI: 2× Platinum
Santeria (with Gué Pequeno)	Released: 24 June 2016; Label: Universal; Format: CD, LP, digital download	1	12	FIMI: 5× Platinum
Persona	Released: 31 October 2019; Label: Island; Format: CD, LP, digital download, streaming	1	48	FIMI: 9× Platinum
Noi, loro, gli altri	Released: 19 November 2021; Label: Island; Format: CD, LP, digital download, streaming	1	16	FIMI: 7× Platinum
È finita la pace	Released: 13 December 2024; Label: Island; Format: CD, LP, digital download, streaming	1	9	FIMI: 2× Platinum

=== Live albums ===
Title	Album details
Santeria Live (with Gué Pequeno)	Released: 31 March 2017; Label: Universal; Format: CD, DVD, digital download

=== Mixtapes ===
Title	Album details
Roccia Music I	Released: 2005; Label: independent; Format: digital download
Roccia Music II	Released: 2011; Label: Roccia Music; Format: digital download
Double Dragon Mixtape (with Gué Pequeno)	Released: 28 May 2016; Label: Universal; Format: digital download

=== Singles ===
==== As lead artist ====
List of singles as main artist, with chart positions, album name and certifications
Single	Year	Peak chart positions	Certifications	Album
Single	Year	ITA	Certifications	Album
"Badabum Cha Cha"	2008	9	FIMI: Gold	Marracash
"Estate in città"	2008	—		Marracash
"Non confondermi"	2008	—		Marracash
"Tutto questo"	2009	—		Marracash
"Stupido"	2010	—		Fino a qui tutto bene
"Rivincita" (featuring Giusy Ferreri)	2010	100		Fino a qui tutto bene
"Parole chiave"	2010	—		Fino a qui tutto bene
"King del Rap"	2011	36	FIMI: Gold	King del Rap
"Didinò"	2011	63		King del Rap
"Sabbie mobili"	2012	—		King del Rap
"Giusto un giro" (featuring Emis Killa)	2012	65	FIMI: Gold	King del Rap
"Se il mondo fosse" (with Emis Killa, Club Dogo and J-Ax)	2012	2	FIMI: Platinum	Non-album singles
"La tipa del tipo" (with DJ Tayone)	2013	32		Non-album singles
"Status"	2014	2	FIMI: Platinum	Status
"In radio"	2015	59	FIMI: Platinum	Status
"Nella macchina" (featuring Neffa)	2015	—		Status
"Vita da star RMX/Playboy" (with Fabri Fibra)	2015	—		Status
"Senza un posto nel mondo" (featuring Tiziano Ferro)	2015	—		Status
"Catatonica"	2015	—		Status (Vendetta Edition)
"Niente canzoni d'amore" (featuring Federica Abbate)	2016	54	FIMI: 3× Platinum	Status (Vendetta Edition)
"Nulla accade" (with Gué Pequeno)	2016	16	FIMI: 2× Platinum	Santeria
"Insta Lova" (with Gué Pequeno)	2016	24	FIMI: 4× Platinum	Santeria
"Ninja" (with Gué Pequeno)	2016	62		Santeria (Voodoo Edition)
"Scooteroni RMX" (with Gué Pequeno featuring Sfera Ebbasta)	2016	62	FIMI: 3× Platinum	Santeria (Voodoo Edition)
"Maserati" (with Il Profeta)	2017	—		Non-album single
"Business class" (featuring Rkomi)	2018	19	FIMI: Gold	Marracash (10 anni dopo)
"F.A.K.E." (with Don Joe and Jake La Furia)	2019	32		Non-album single
"Marylean" (with Salmo and Nitro)	2019	3	FIMI: 2× Platinum	Machete Mixtape 4
"Non ci sto" (with Shablo and Carl Brave)	2019	7	FIMI: Platinum	Non-album single
"Bravi a cadere - I polmoni"	2019	8	FIMI: 3× Platinum	Persona
"Neon - Le ali" (featuring Elisa)	2020	5	FIMI: Platinum	Persona
"Sport - I muscoli" (featuring Luchè)	2020	3	FIMI: 2× Platinum	Persona
"Crazy Love"	2021	2	FIMI: 4× Platinum	Noi, loro, gli altri
"Laurea ad honorem" (featuring Calcutta)	2022	8	FIMI: 2× Platinum	Noi, loro, gli altri
"La pioggia alla domenica" (with Vasco Rossi)	2022	11	FIMI: Gold	Non-album single
"Importante"	2022	13	FIMI: Platinum	Noi, loro, gli altri
"Un altro mondo" (with Merk & Kremont and Tananai)	2023	17	FIMI: 2× Platinum	Non-album single
"Gli sbandati hanno perso"	2024	1	FIMI: Platinum	È finita la pace
"Lei"	2025	5	FIMI: Gold	È finita la pace
"Casini" (with Gué)	2026	12		Non-album single

==== As featured artist ====
List of singles as supporting artist, with chart positions, album name and certifications
Single	Year	Peak chart positions	Certifications	Album
Single	Year	ITA	Certifications	Album
"Come la" (The Bloody Beetroots featuring Marracash)	2009	63		Romborama
"Qualcuno normale" (Fabri Fibra featuring Marracash)	2011	—		Controcultura
"Noi siamo il club" (Club Dogo featuring Marracash)	2012	—		Noi siamo il club
"Non cambierò mai" (Baby K featuring Marracash)	2013	72	FIMI: Gold	Una seria
"Come ieri" (Giuliano Palma featuring Marracash)	2013	63		Old Boy
"Milano Bachata" (Rkomi featuring Marracash)	2017	9	FIMI: 2× Platinum	Io in terra
"Pensare troppo mi fa male" (Federica Abbate featuring Marracash)	2018	—		In foto vengo male
"Margarita" (Elodie featuring Marracash)	2019	6	FIMI: 3× Platinum	This Is Elodie
"Barona" (Young Rame featuring Marracash)	2020	—		Le jeune Simba
"Defuera" (Dardust featuring Marracash, Ghali and Madame)	2020	33	FIMI: Platinum	Non-album single
"Fantasmi" (DJ Tayone featuring Geolier and Marracash)	2021	18	FIMI: Platinum	Djungle
"Solo lei ha quel che voglio 2021" (Sottotono featuring Marracash, Gué Pequeno and Tiziano Ferro)	2021	51		Originali
"Le pietre non volano" (Luché featuring Marracash)	2022	11	FIMI: Platinum	Dove volano le aquile
"Adrenalina" (Baby Gang featuring Blanco and Marracash)	2024	14	FIMI: Platinum	L'angelo del male
"Volevo capire" (Madame featuring Marracash)	2026	10	FIMI: Gold	Disincanto

=== Other selected charted songs ===
List of selected non-single songs, with chart positions, album name and certifications
Single	Year	Peak chart positions	Certifications	Album	Notes
Single	Year	ITA	Certifications	Album	Notes
"Salvador Dalí" (with Gué Pequeno)	2016	25	FIMI: 2× Platinum	Santeria	
"Cosa mia" (with Gué Pequeno)	2016	44	FIMI: Gold	Santeria	
"Money" (with Gué Pequeno)	2016	50	FIMI: Gold	Santeria	
"Senza Dio" (with Gué Pequeno)	2016	58	FIMI: Gold	Santeria	
"Ca$mere" (with Gué Pequeno)	2016	52	FIMI: Platinum	Santeria (Voodoo Edition)	
"Valentino"	2018	47		Marracash (10 anni dopo)	
"Body Parts - I denti"	2019	9	FIMI: Platinum	Persona	
"Qualcosa in cui credere - Lo scheletro" (featuring Gué Pequeno)	2019	6	FIMI: Platinum	Persona	
"Quelli che non pensano - Il cervello" (featuring Coez)	2019	4	FIMI: Platinum	Persona	
"Appartengo - Il sangue" (featuring Massimo Pericolo)	2019	5	FIMI: Platinum	Persona	
"Poco di buon - Il fegato"	2019	13	FIMI: Gold	Persona	
"Non sono Marra - La pelle" (featuring Mahmood)	2019	11	FIMI: Platinum	Persona	
"Supreme - L'ego" (with Tha Supreme and Sfera Ebbasta)	2019	1	FIMI: 3× Platinum	Persona	
"Da buttare - Il cazzo"	2019	15	FIMI: Gold	Persona	
"Crudelia - I nervi"	2019	2	FIMI: 6× Platinum	Persona	
"G.O.A.T. - Il cuore"	2019	12	FIMI: Platinum	Persona	
"Madame - L'anima" (featuring Madame)	2019	7	FIMI: 3× Platinum	Persona	
"Tutto questo - Gli occhi"	2019	19	FIMI: Gold	Persona	
"Greta Thunberg - Lo stomaco" (featuring Cosmo)	2019	18	FIMI: Gold	Persona	
"64 barre di paura" (with Marz)	2021	38	FIMI: Platinum	Red Bull 64 Bars, The Album	
"Loro"	2021	6	FIMI: Platinum	Noi, loro, gli altri	
"Pagliaccio"	2021	7	FIMI: Platinum	Noi, loro, gli altri	
"Infinity Love" (with Gué Pequeno)	2021	1	FIMI: 5× Platinum	Noi, loro, gli altri	
"Io"	2021	3	FIMI: Platinum	Noi, loro, gli altri	
"Cosplayer"	2021	9	FIMI: Gold	Noi, loro, gli altri	
"Dubbi"	2021	5	FIMI: 2× Platinum	Noi, loro, gli altri	
"Noi"	2021	10	FIMI: Platinum	Noi, loro, gli altri	
"Noi, loro, gli altri skit"	2021	16		Noi, loro, gli altri	
"Gli altri (Giorni stupidi)"	2021	11	FIMI: Platinum	Noi, loro, gli altri	
"Nemesi" (featuring Blanco)	2021	4	FIMI: 2× Platinum	Noi, loro, gli altri	
"Cliffhanger"	2021	12	FIMI: Gold	Noi, loro, gli altri	
"Power Slap"	2024	2		È finita la pace	
"Crash"	2024	4		È finita la pace	
"È finita la pace"	2024	3		È finita la pace	
"Detox / Rehab"	2024	7		È finita la pace	
"Soli"	2024	10		È finita la pace	
"Mi sono innamorato di un AI"	2024	16		È finita la pace	
"Factotum"	2024	17		È finita la pace	
"Vittima"	2024	6	FIMI: Gold	È finita la pace	
"Troi*"	2024	19		È finita la pace	
"Pentothal"	2024	14		È finita la pace	
"Happy End"	2024	22		È finita la pace	

=== Guest appearances ===
Title	Year	Other artist(s)	Album
"Hustelbound"	2005	Grand Agent, Don Joe, Vincenzo da Via Anfossi, Ask	Regular
"Che nessuno si muova"	2005	Gué Pequeno	Hashishinz Sound Vol. 1
"Boss!"	2005	Gué Pequeno, Vincenzo da Via Anfossi, Jake La Furia	Hashishinz Sound Vol. 1
"Il giustiziere della notte"	2006	Rischio, Vincenzo da Via Anfossi, Jake La Furia	Reloaded - Lo spettacolo è finito Pt. 2
"D.O.G.O."	2006	Club Dogo	Penna capitale
"Briatori"	2006	Club Dogo	Penna capitale
"Mentalità da clan"	2007	Noyz Narcos	Verano Zombie
"La gente fa…"	2007	EnMiCasa, Club Dogo, Vincenzo da Via Anfossi	Senza respiro
"Puro Bogotà"	2007	Club Dogo, Vincenzo da Via Anfossi	Vile denaro
"Pallottole nelle lettere"	2007	Space One, Club Dogo, Vincenzo da Via Anfossi	Il ritorno
"Motolov Cocktail"	2007	Ted Bundy	Motolov Cocktail
"Chi ci ferma"	2007	Montenero, Gué Pequeno, Jake La Furia	Milano spara
"Popolari"	2008	Vincenzo da Via Anfossi	L'ora d'aria
"Domani 21/04.09"	2009	Artisti Uniti per l'Abruzzo	
"Meglio che morto"	2009	Club Dogo	Dogocrazia
"Il commercialista"	2009	J-Ax	Deca Dance
"Rap Stallions"	2009	Gué Pequeno, Izio Sklero	Fastlife Mixtape Vol. 2 - Faster Life
"Nun me parla 'e strada"	2009	CoSang, El Koyote	Vita bona
"Grand Guignol"	2010	Noyz Narcos	Guilty
"Ciao proprio"	2010	Club Dogo	Che bello essere noi
"Bla Bla"	2010	Emis Killa	Champagne e spine
"Big!"	2011	Gué Pequeno, Jake La Furia, Nex Cassell, Ensi, 'Nto	Il ragazzo d'oro
"Voglio fare i $"	2011	Entics	Soundboy
"Blues"	2011	Fedez, Gué Pequeno	Il mio primo disco da venduto
"Il mondo dei grandi"	2012	Emis Killa	L'erba cattiva
"La prova vivente"	2012	Rapstar	Non è gratis
"Rockstar"	2012	Luchè	L1
"Dalle palazzine"	2013	Clementino, Noyz Narcos, Francesco Paura	Mea Culpa
"Brivido"	2013	Gué Pequeno	Bravo ragazzo
"Esercizio di stile"	2013	Jake La Furia, Gué Pequeno	Musica commerciale
"Genesi"	2013	Corrado, Fred De Palma, Achille Lauro, Luchè, DJ Tayone	Genesi
"Real Royal Street Rap"	2014	Achille Lauro	Achille Idol immortale
"Dal centro all'hinterland"	2015	Clementino, Noyz Narcos	Miracolo!
"Ora lo so"	2015	Achille Lauro	Dio c'è
"XDVRMX"	2015	Sfera Ebbasta, Luchè	XDVR Reloaded
"Relaxxx"	2017	Gué Pequeno	Gentleman
"Modalità aereo"	2018	Gué Pequeno, Luchè	Sinatra
"Pepita Bluemoon"	2018	Cor Veleno	Lo spirito che suona
"Occh1 purpl3"	2019	Tha Supreme	23 6451
"Fiori"	2019	Gemitaiz, Madman, Gué Pequeno	Scatola nera
"Street Advisor"	2019	Night Skinny, Noyz Narcos, Capo Plaza	Mattoni
"Milano ovest"	2020	Shiva	Routine
"Tardissimo"	2020	Gué Pequeno, Mahmood	Mr. Fini
"Tik Tok"	2020	Sfera Ebbasta	Famoso
"La chiave"	2021	Salmo	Flop
"No Wallet"	2022	Paky	Salvatore
"K.O."	2022	Gemitaiz, Coez	Eclissi
"Noia"	2022	Fabri Fibra	Caos
"Free Solo"	2022	Ghali	Sensazioni ultra
"Free"	2023	Gué Pequeno	Madreperla
"Il male che mi fai"	2023	Geolier	Il coraggio dei bambini - Atto II
"Diluvio a luglio"	2023	Tedua	La Divina Commedia
"Yalla"	2023	Drillionaire	10
"Respira"	2023	Salmo & Noyz Narcos	Cvlt
"15 piani"	2023	Sfera Ebbasta	X2VR
"Nato per questo"	2024	Club Dogo	Club Dogo

== Awards and nominations ==
Year	Award	Category	Nominated work	Result
2008	M.E.I. Award	Artist of the Year	Himself	Won
2012	MTV Hip Hop Award	Best Artist	Himself	Won
2012	MTV Hip Hop Award	Best Collaboration	"Se il mondo fosse"	Won
2022	Targa Tenco	Best Album	Noi, loro, gli altri	Won
