= Dalli (surname) =

Dalli is a surname of Italian origin, and has a related Spanish surname form Dali. Notable people with the surname include:

- Helena Dalli, Maltese politician
- John Dalli (born 1948), prominent Maltese politician, European Commissioner in the second Barroso Commission
- Angelo Dalli (born 1978), prominent Maltese computer scientist
- Larissa Dalli, Gibraltarian dancer
- Toni Dalli (born 1980), Italian musician and restaurant owner
