= Salvador Dalí (song) =

Song by Guè and Marracash

from the album Santeria
- Released: June 24, 2016
- Recorded: 2016
- Genre: Trap
- Length: 4:05
- Label: Universal
- Songwriters: Cosimo Fini; Fabio Rizzo; Paolo Alberto Monachetti
- Producer: Charlie Charles

Music video
- "Salvador Dalí" by Marracash & Guè Pequeno on YouTube

"Salvador Dalì" is a song written and recorded by Italian rappers Guè and Marracash. It serves as the fifth track from their collaborative studio album Santeria, released in 2016.

== The song ==
Composed and recorded in Santa Cruz de Tenerife, Spain, this is the first song created for the album. Originally titled "Illegali", the two rappers decided to change the title of the song paying tribute to the figure of the Spanish painter Salvador Dalí, as they have found a similarity in the lifestyle of the painter with the rapper stereotype.

Although it was not extracted as a single, the song was certified double platinum by FIMI for selling over 100,000 copies.

== Music video ==
The music video was filmed in Milan, Brunate and Garbagnate Milanese, under the direction of Andrea and Corrado Folino Perria with the rapper Salmo as assistant director. It was created with images and suggestions recalling the works of the famous surrealist painter Salvador Dalí, and was released on October 6, 2016.

== Charts ==
Chart (2016)	Peak position
Italy (FIMI)	25

== Certifications ==
Certification for "Salvador Dalí"
Region	Certification	Certified units/sales
Italy (FIMI)	2× Platinum	100,000^{‡}
^{‡} Sales+streaming figures based on certification alone.
