= È finita la pace =

Studio album by Marracash
- Released: 13 December 2024
- Genre: Hip hop
- Length: 46:22
- Label: Island
- Producer: Fritz da Cat; Marz; Zef

Marracash chronology
Noi, loro, gli altri (2021)	È finita la pace (2024)

Singles from È finita la pace
- 1. "Gli sbandati hanno perso" Released: 13 December 2024; 2. "Lei" Released: 4 April 2025

È finita la pace (lit. 'The peace is over') is the seventh studio album by Italian rapper Marracash, released on 13 December 2024 by Island Records.

== Track listing ==
È finita la pace track listing
No.	Title	Lyrics	Music	Length
1.	"Power Slap"	Fabio Rizzo	Alessandro Pulga; Stefano Tognini	3:17
2.	"Crash"	Rizzo	Alessandro Civitelli; Pulga; Tognini	4:07
3.	"Gli sbandati hanno perso"	Rizzo	Pulga; Tognini	3:14
4.	"È finita la pace"	Rizzo; Ivan Graziani	Pulga; Tognini; Graziani	2:58
5.	"Detox / Rehab"	Rizzo	Pulga; Tognini	3:56
6.	"Soli"	Rizzo; Camillo Facchinetti; Valerio Negrini	Pulga; Tognini; Facchinetti; Negrini	3:57
7.	"Mi sono innamorato di un AI"	Rizzo; Chiara Floris	Pulga; Tognini; Floris	3:52
8.	"Factotum"	Rizzo	Pulga; Tognini	3:38
9.	"Vittima"	Rizzo	Pulga; Tognini	3:50
10.	"Troi*"	Rizzo	Pulga; Tognini	3:45
11.	"Pentothal"	Rizzo	Pulga; Tognini	3:24
12.	"Lei"	Rizzo	Pulga; Tognini	3:40
13.	"Happy End"	Rizzo	Pulga; Tognini	4:29

== Charts ==
Weekly chart performance for È finita la pace
Chart (2024)	Peak position
Italian Albums (FIMI)	1
Swiss Albums (Schweizer Hitparade)	9

Year-end chart performance for "È finita la pace"
Chart (2025)	Position
Italy (FIMI)	6

== Certifications ==
Region	Certification	Certified units/sales
Italy (FIMI)	3× Platinum	150,000^{‡}
^{‡} Sales+streaming figures based on certification alone.
