= Jianxi, Fujian =

Jianxi 建西镇
- Town
- Location in Fujian Jianxi (China)
- Coordinates: 26.81472°N 117.95132°E
- Country: People's Republic of China
- Province: Fujian
- Prefecture-level city: Nanping
- County: Shunchang County
- Time zone: UTC+8 (China Standard)

Jianxi (Chinese: 建西; pinyin: Jiànxī) is a town of Shunchang County in Fujian province, China. As of 2018, it has one residential community and 9 villages under its administration.

== See also ==
- List of township-level divisions of Fujian
