= Gli sbandati hanno perso =

Single by Marracash

from the album È finita la pace
- Released: 13 December 2024
- Genre: Hip hop
- Length: 3:14
- Label: Island
- Songwriters: Fabio Rizzo; Alessandro Pulga; Stefano Tognini
- Producers: Marz; Zef

Marracash singles chronology
"Adrenalina" (2024)	"Gli sbandati hanno perso" (2024)	"Lei" (2025)

"Gli sbandati hanno perso" (transl. "The bums lost") is a song written and recorded by Italian rapper Marracash, released on 13 December 2024 by Island as the lead single from his eight studio album È finita la pace.

The track was written by the rapper himself and produced by Marz and Zef. It includes a musical sample from "Last Men Standing", a piece composed in 1968 by Gian Franco Reverberi and Gian Piero Reverberi for the soundtrack of the film Django, Prepare a Coffin. The title refers to a quote from a scene in the film The Big Lebowski, spoken by actor David Huddleston.

The song topped the FIMI singles chart and the Italian airplay chart.

== Charts ==
=== Weekly charts ===
Weekly chart performance for "Gli sbandati hanno perso"
Chart (2024–25)	Peak position
Italy (FIMI)	1
Italy Airplay (EarOne)	1

=== Year-end charts ===
Year-end chart performance for "Gli sbandati hanno perso"
Chart (2025)	Position
Italy (FIMI)	36

== Certifications ==
Region	Certification	Certified units/sales
Italy (FIMI)	Platinum	200,000^{‡}
^{‡} Sales+streaming figures based on certification alone.
