= Nulla accade =

Single by Guè and Marracash

from the album Santeria
- Released: June 7, 2016
- Recorded: 2016
- Genre: Hip hop
- Length: 3:52
- Label: Universal
- Songwriters: Cosimo Fini; Fabio Rizzo; Alessandro Pulga
- Producer: Marz

Guè and Marracash singles chronology
"Di nascosto" (2015)	"Nulla accade" (2016)	"Insta Lova" (2016)

"Nulla accade" is a single by Italian rappers Guè and Marracash. It was released on June 7, 2016 as the lead single from their collaborative studio album Santeria. The song is certified double platinum in Italy.

== Charts ==
Chart (2006)	Peak position
Italy (FIMI)	16
