= Les P'tits Mots =

Studio album by Dalida
- Released: 1983
- Recorded: 1982–1983
- Genres: World; pop; new wave; adult contemporary
- Labels: Orlando International Shows; Carrere

Dalida chronology
| Mondialement vôtre (1982) | Les P'tits Mots (1983) | Dali (1984) |

Les P'tits Mots (The Small Words) is a French language album released by Dalida in 1983.

== Overview ==
The album contained less upbeat dance songs and more biographical and love songs. "Lucas" touches the theme of Dalida's being childless, "Mourir sur scène" expresses her wish to die while still at the height of fame, and "Bravo" about the misfortunes of fame.

Dalida began promotion for the album in Canada during the month of April 1983. Being the guest of honour in the Tele-Quebec Telethon television special in which she performed five songs from the album. To promote the album in France, Dalida recorded a one-hour TV special called Formule Un with the then number one French television programme "Les Carpentiers". She performed seven songs from the new album on "Les Carpentiers", with the most notable performance being the haunting "Mourir sur scène" rendition.

Dalida only released the following double sided singles of this album Les P'tits Mots / Mourir sur scène before releasing an updated version of the album that included two new recordings, namely "Femme", a cover of a Charlie Chaplin movie theme called "Smile", and the song "Ton Prénom dans mon coeur", a cover of the love theme from "Jeux interdits", which had previously been sung with other lyrics by French singer Mireille Mathieu.

Dalida released from the second album the double sided singles Femme / Le restaurant Italien and performed the song "Femme" on various French TV shows.

== Track listing ==
1. Les P'tits Mots
2. Lucas
3. Téléphonez-moi
4. Marie Madeleine
5. Bravo
6. Mourir sur scène
7. Le Restaurant italien
8. J'aime
9. S'aimer
10. Le Premier Amour du monde

== Track listing (as Ton prénom dans mon coeur, 1983) ==
1. Femme
2. Mourir sur scène
3. Téléphonez-moi
4. Lucas
5. Confidences sur la fréquence
6. Ton Prénom dans mon cœur
7. Les P'tits Mots
8. Le Restaurant italien

== Singles ==
=== Album singles ===
- 1983 Les P'tits Mots / Mourir sur scène

Back in 1983, the song "Mourir sur scène" was considered one of the most beautiful songs Dalida had ever recorded. After Dalida's death, the song "Mourir sur scène" took a huge meaning and became one of her most legendary songs. The song's music and powerful lyrics say that the singer's only desire is to die on stage where she was born, and the singer talks with death during the verses symbolically asking death not to strike when the singer is sleeping alone in the shadows. Dalida's live performances of this song during her concerts were so powerful and sincere that it was always followed by a standing ovation. The song became immensely popular and is now considered a classical French pop ballad of the 1980s and one of Dalida's trademarks and signature tracks. A remix of the song was released in 1995 but the original version of the song is the most widely played on radio stations in all French speaking countries to this day. Dalida recorded the song in French, English, Spanish and Italian, whilst Shirley Bassey included the English version of the song in her repertoire and performed it during her live concerts in the early nineties.

- 1983 Femme / Le restaurant italien

"Femme" is a Charlie Chaplin movie theme that have been recorded by Dalida in 1983 after receiving the blessings from Charlie Chaplin family and rights owners. Dalida widely performed "Femme" on French television and there are no less than 18 performances of the song on French television.

Dalida performed this song with four male dancers around her as part of the song's choreography.

=== Non-album singles ===
- 1983 Buona sera Phantasie / Der Charme der kleinen Worte

Dalida chose from this album the songs "Le Restaurant italien" and "Les P'tits mots" to record in German and release them as singles in Germany. Dalida promoted this release through various German TV appearances in prime time shows most notably the Roberto Blanco Show.
