= Shunchang County =

Shunchang County 顺昌县
- County
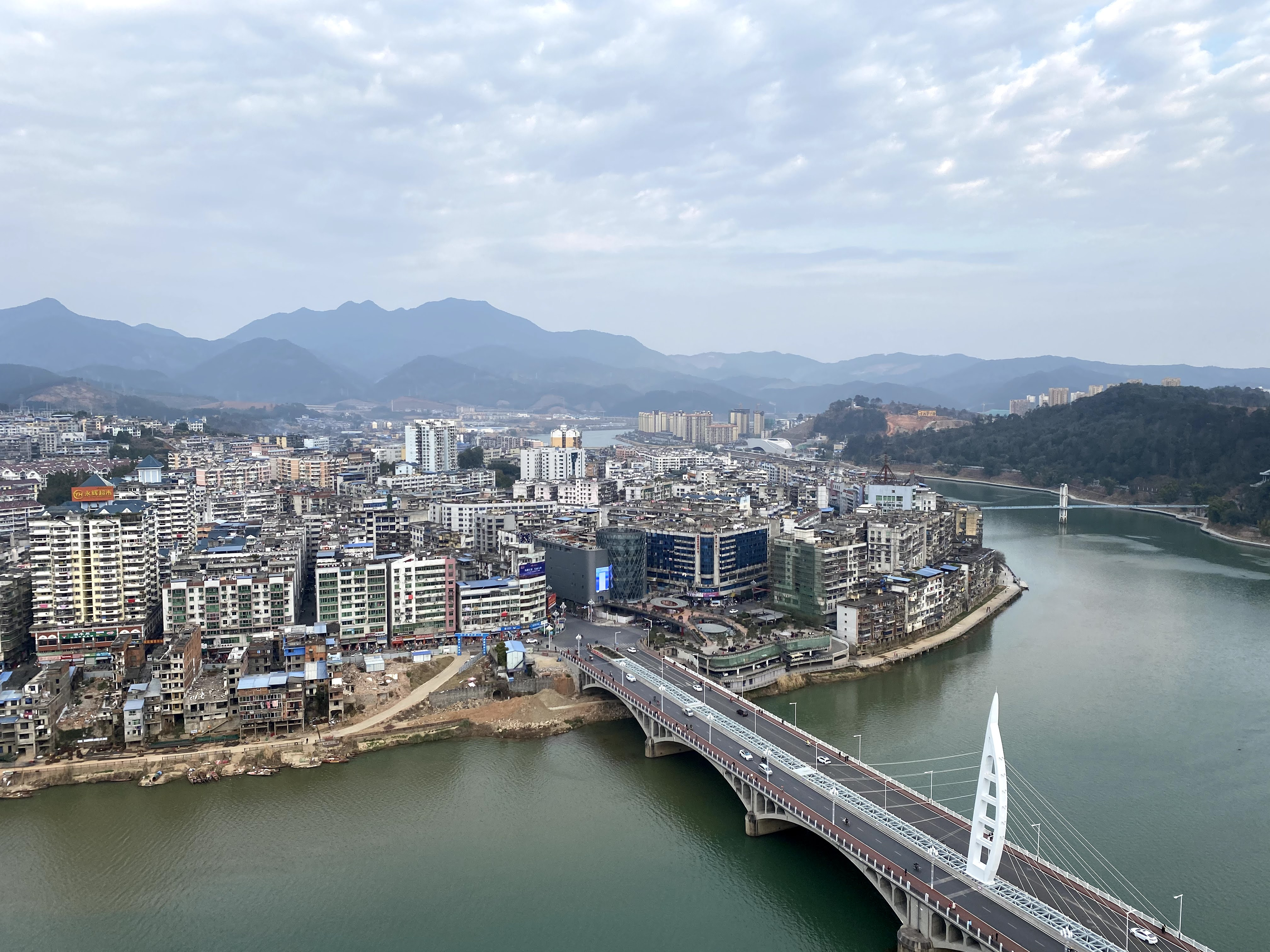

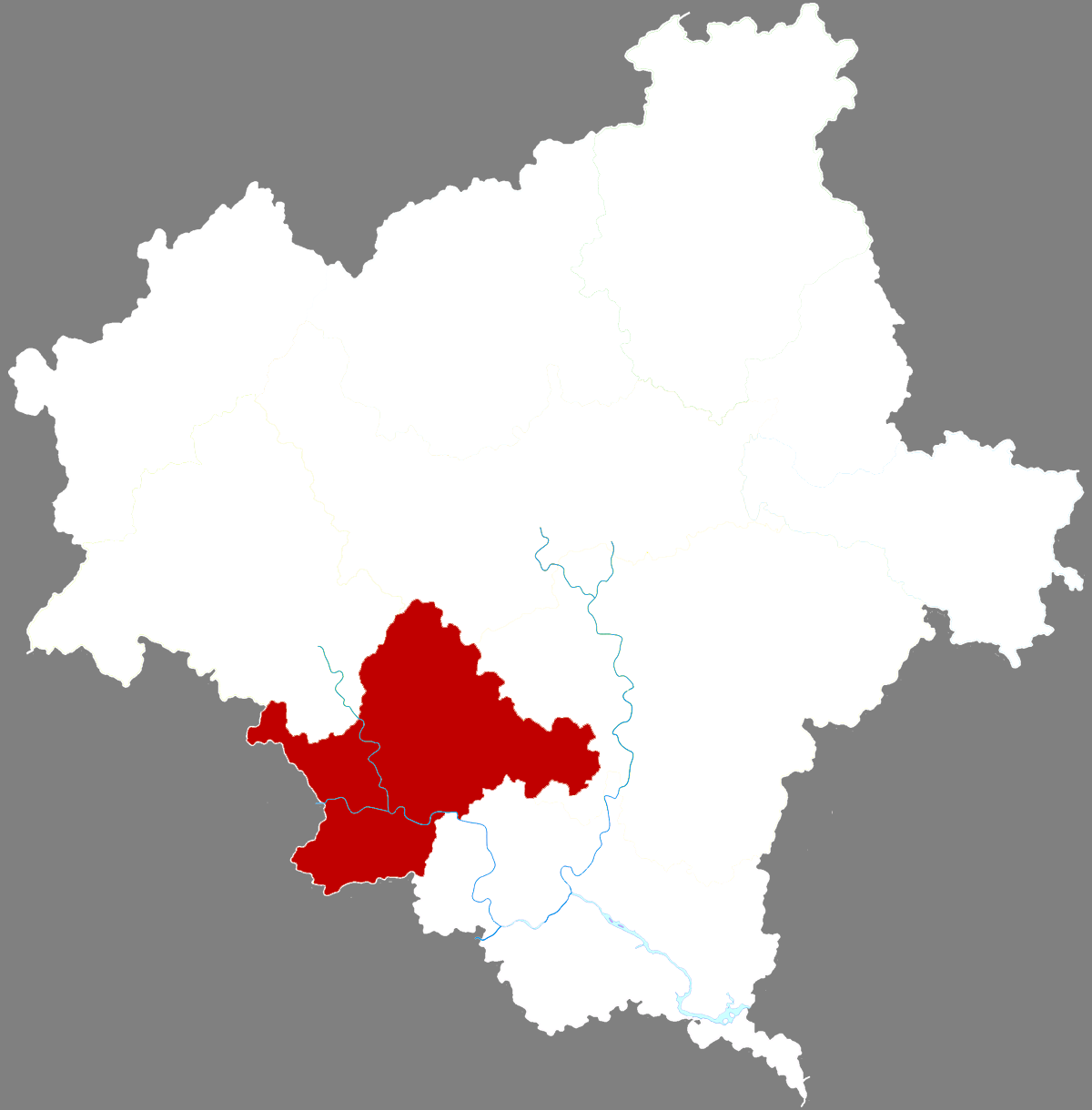
- Location of Shunchang County within Nanping City

- Location in Fujian
- Coordinates: 26°47′35″N 117°48′36″E
- Country: People's Republic of China
- Province: Fujian
- Prefecture-level city: Nanping

Government
  - CPC County Committee Secretary: Jiang Jianhua

Area
  - Land: 1,985 km^{2} (766 sq mi)

Population (2020 census)
  - County: 179,064
  - Density: 90.21/km^{2} (233.6/sq mi)
  - Urban: 92,001
  - Rural: 87,063
- Time zone: UTC+8 (China Standard)
- Postal code: 353200
- Vehicle licence plates: 闽H
- Website: www.fjsc.gov.cn

Shunchang County (simplified Chinese: 顺昌县; traditional Chinese: 順昌縣; pinyin: Shùnchāng Xiàn; Northern Min: Sē̤ng-chióng-gṳ̄ing) is a county under the administration of Nanping City, in the northwest of Fujian province, People's Republic of China. The county's name was established in 933, during the Tang dynasty. It has a total population of approximately 179,064 people as of the end of 2020. It is a key region for forestry and the production of coarse bamboo in Fujian.

== Administrative divisions ==
Shunchang County administers one subdistrict, seven towns, and four rural townships. The subdistrict is Shuangxi. The towns include Jianxi, Yangkou, Yuankeng, Bushang, Dali, Dagan, and Renshou. The rural townships include Yangdun, Zhengfang, Lanxia, and Gaoyang.

== Geography ==
Shunchang County has two major brooks, Futunxi and Jinxi, as well as numerous smaller tributaries.

== Specialty ==
- Renshou Guandan (仁寿灌蛋)

== Notable people ==
- Hou Yuzhu
- Zhang Guozheng

== Climate ==
Climate data for Shunchang, elevation 175 m (574 ft), (1991–2020 normals, extremes 1981–2010)
Month	Jan	Feb	Mar	Apr	May	Jun	Jul	Aug	Sep	Oct	Nov	Dec	Year
Record high °C (°F)	28.1 (82.6)	33.2 (91.8)	33.8 (92.8)	35.9 (96.6)	36.7 (98.1)	37.5 (99.5)	40.8 (105.4)	40.3 (104.5)	38.2 (100.8)	36.2 (97.2)	34.4 (93.9)	28.5 (83.3)	40.8 (105.4)
Mean daily maximum °C (°F)	14.0 (57.2)	16.3 (61.3)	19.3 (66.7)	24.8 (76.6)	28.4 (83.1)	31.0 (87.8)	34.4 (93.9)	34.0 (93.2)	31.2 (88.2)	26.9 (80.4)	21.5 (70.7)	16.0 (60.8)	24.8 (76.7)
Daily mean °C (°F)	8.9 (48.0)	11.0 (51.8)	14.0 (57.2)	19.1 (66.4)	22.9 (73.2)	25.8 (78.4)	28.3 (82.9)	27.8 (82.0)	25.4 (77.7)	20.6 (69.1)	15.5 (59.9)	10.3 (50.5)	19.1 (66.4)
Mean daily minimum °C (°F)	5.7 (42.3)	7.6 (45.7)	10.7 (51.3)	15.4 (59.7)	19.4 (66.9)	22.4 (72.3)	24.0 (75.2)	24.0 (75.2)	21.7 (71.1)	16.8 (62.2)	12.0 (53.6)	6.8 (44.2)	15.5 (60.0)
Record low °C (°F)	−4.5 (23.9)	−3.2 (26.2)	−3.2 (26.2)	4.3 (39.7)	10.2 (50.4)	14.0 (57.2)	19.5 (67.1)	18.8 (65.8)	13.0 (55.4)	4.9 (40.8)	−0.8 (30.6)	−7.7 (18.1)	−7.7 (18.1)
Average precipitation mm (inches)	71.7 (2.82)	107.5 (4.23)	211.5 (8.33)	196.6 (7.74)	260.5 (10.26)	337.8 (13.30)	149.6 (5.89)	153.3 (6.04)	91.5 (3.60)	58.7 (2.31)	70.8 (2.79)	60.6 (2.39)	1,770.1 (69.7)
Average precipitation days (≥ 0.1 mm)	11.5	13.6	18.4	17.0	18.4	18.8	12.6	14.2	10.4	7.2	8.3	9.1	159.5
Average snowy days	0.5	0.5	0	0	0	0	0	0	0	0	0	0.3	1.3
Average relative humidity (%)	81	81	82	80	81	83	77	78	78	77	80	80	80
Mean monthly sunshine hours	86.2	85.3	90.1	110.6	130.9	136.5	234.0	215.0	175.2	159.9	120.0	109.3	1,653
Percentage possible sunshine	26	27	24	29	31	33	56	54	48	45	37	34	37
Source: China Meteorological Administration

== See also ==
- List of administrative divisions of Fujian
