= Badabum Cha Cha =

2008 single by Marracash

Single by Marracash

from the album Marracash
- Released: April 18, 2008
- Recorded: 2008
- Genre: Hip hop
- Length: 3:38
- Label: Universal Music Group
- Songwriters: Fabio Rizzo; Piermarco Gianotti
- Producer: Del

Marracash singles chronology
| "Badabum Cha Cha" (2008) | "Estate in città" (2008) |

Badabum Cha Cha is the debut single by Italian rapper Marracash. It was released on April 18, 2008, as the lead single from the rapper's self-title debut studio album. The song was first released on Marracash's official website and just in two days, the song had been listened 5,000 times. Due to high Italian airplay, and also due to high sales, the song from #31, reached a peak of #25.

The single sales over 50,000 copies.

== Music video ==
The video of the song was shot in Barona, Milan, in March 2008. It was released on the official rapper's MySpace and subsequently released on MTV from April 21. J-Ax also appears in the video.

== Charts ==
Chart performance for "Badabum Cha Cha"
| Chart (2008) | Peak position |
|---|---|
| Italy (FIMI) | 9 |
