= Dali (Dalida album) =

Studio album by Dalida
- Released: 1984
- Recorded: 1984
- Genres: World music, pop, new wave, adult contemporary
- Labels: Orlando International Shows, Carrere Records

Dalida chronology
Les p'tits mots (1983)	Dali (1984)	Le visage de l'amour (1986)

Dali is a French-language album released in 1984 by French-Italian singer Dalida.

This album sees new collaborations with French song writers like Didier Barbelivien, Claude Barzotti, and François Valéry among others. The album also includes a lot of covers of international hits like I Just Called to Say I Love You (Pour te dire je t'aime), Against All Odds (Toutes ces heures loin de toi), Baby, Come to Me (C'etait mon ami) and Kalimba de Luna.

Dalida promoted three main singles from the album, appearing frequently on French television during 1984. She also enjoyed many TV appearances on German TV and went back to Italy for a few TV shows after a 4-year break from Italian television. Dalida also launched her last big tour in France performing every night in front of sell-out crowds throughout France.

To promote the album, a television special later released on VHS called Dalida Idéale was filmed in 1984, and directed by Jean-Christophe Averty. Although highly campy, this television special includes Dalida singing in 7 languages and dancing her way through a huge number of her earlier hits.

== Track listing ==
1. Pour te dire je t'aime
2. Là où je t'aime
3. Une vie d'homme
4. Toutes ces heures loin de toi
5. Kalimba de luna
6. La Pensione Bianca
7. C'était mon ami
8. Pour en arriver là
9. Mon Italie
10. Soleil

== Singles ==
=== Album singles ===
- 1984 L'innamorata / Soleil

It was "Soleil" that gained favorable reviews and popularity especially in the French-speaking world. "L'Innamorata" was not included in the album though it was performed on many TV shows in France.

- 1984 Soleil soleil (New Mix) / Mediterraneo

Dalida recorded "Soleil" in Italian and went on to promote the single in Italy performing it in 2 TV shows. This marks the last TV appearance of Dalida on Italian television.

- 1984 Kalimba de luna

"Kalimba de Luna" was released in the last quarter of 1984. Like "Femme", Dalida had a dancing routine for this song and was usually surrounded by 4 dancers for her TV performances of this song. This marks the last "dance" single released by Dalida and the last time Dalida performs a dance routine for a new release. The song like the other single releases of this year failed to get huge sales although it was widely publicized with Dalida promoting it on various TV appearances in France, Belgium and Canada.

- 1984 Pour te dire je t'aime (I Just Called to Say I Love You)

Her end of year release of the cover "Pour te dire je t'aime" got a lot of TV promotion from the end of 1984 through 1985.

=== Non-album singles ===
- 1984 Nein zärtlich bist du nicht / Worte nur Worte (with Harald Juhnke)

Dalida recorded during 1984 another German version of her famous "Paroles Paroles" with Harald Juhnke for a TV special. She released subsequently the song with a new German single called "Nein zärtlich bist du nich" and did one German TV appearance to promote both singles.

- 1985 Reviens-moi (Last Christmas)

During 1985, Dalida didn't release a new album, but she did release a summer single, another cover of a huge hit: "Last Christmas" became "Reviens moi". The song was a minor hit and Dalida only promoted it for a couple of months in France and Belgium. The B-side was an album song by Didier Barbelivien called "La pensiona Bianca". Promotional singles of this song were published and TV promotion of the song was done on many TV shows by Dalida.

- 1987 Pour en arriver là

One of the best songs on the album, "Pour en arriver là" was not picked up as a single during 1984 but was released as a farewell single after Dalida's death in 1987. The song is autobiographical, telling how she lost her private life in order to maintain her fame.
