= Dali, Beiliu =

Dali 大里镇
- Town
- Location in Guangxi
- Coordinates: 22°43′34″N 110°9′2″E
- Country: People's Republic of China
- Province: Guangxi
- Prefecture-level city: Yulin
- County-level city: Beiliu
- Time zone: UTC+8 (China Standard)

Dali (Chinese: 大里; pinyin: Dàlǐ) is a town under the administration of Beiliu, Guangxi, China. As of 2020, it administers the following 16 villages:

- Dali Village
- Luoyang Village (罗样村)
- Shalie Village (沙埒村)
- Liudui Village (六堆村)
- Xiaoma Village (小马村)
- Lindong Village (林垌村)
- Guantang Village (冠塘村)
- Gaodong Village (高垌村)
- Liuma Village (六马村)
- Yuetang Village (月塘村)
- Datang Village (大塘村)
- Luopo Village (罗坡村)
- Guhong Village (古红村)
- Yongxi Village (雍熙村)
- Lin Village (林村)
- Liuhou Village (六厚村)
