= Dumbo Gets Mad =

Psych-rock duo project

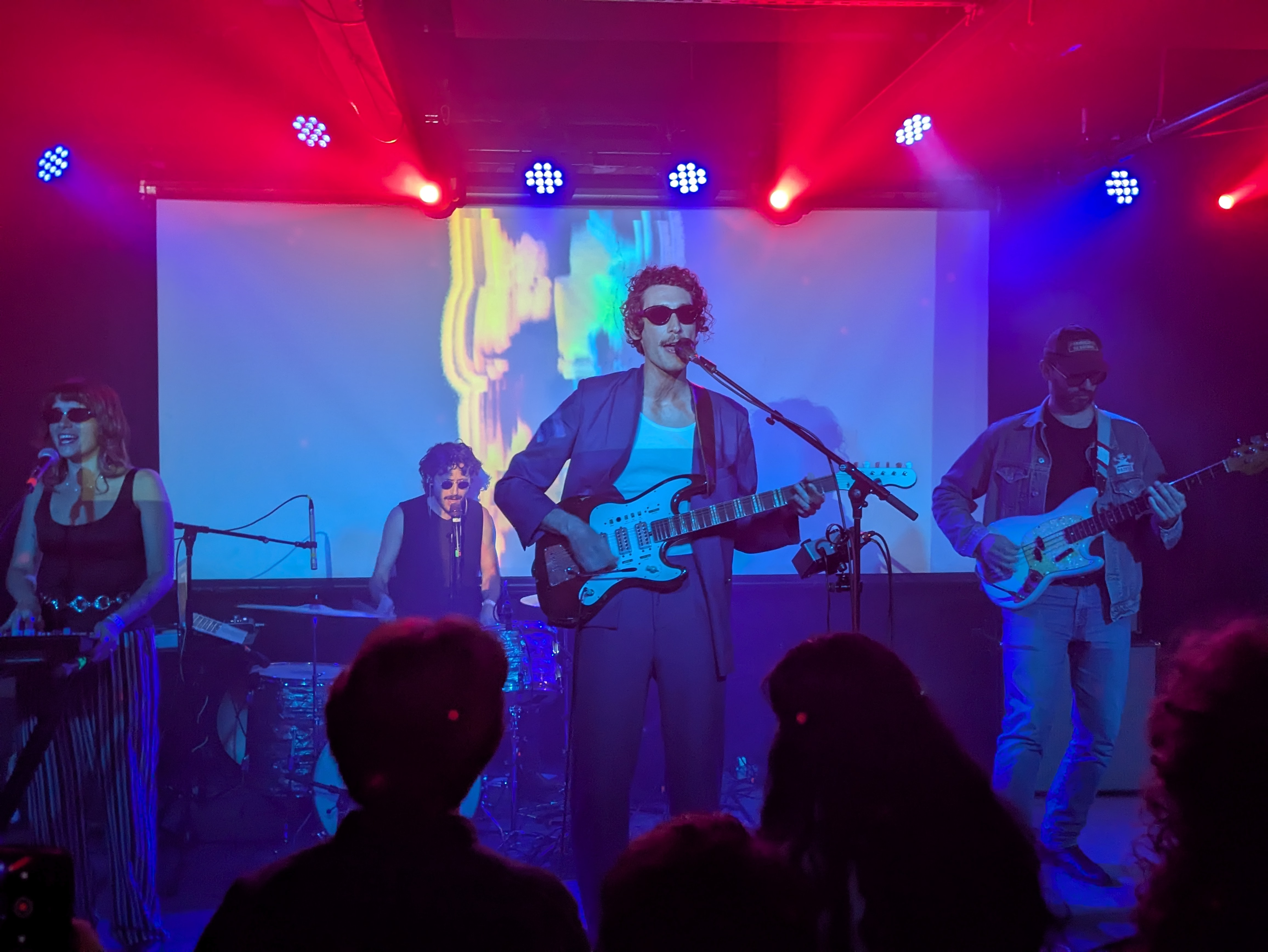
- Dumbo Gets Mad at Urban Lounge, Salt Lake City 2026

Background information
- Origin: Reggio Emilia, Italy
- Genres: Indie pop, synthpop, psychedelic pop
- Years active: 2010–present
- Label: Bad Panda Records

Dumbo Gets Mad is a psychedelic pop project based in Italy. They were founded in early 2011 in Los Angeles by Luca Bergomi, who released his debut album Elephants at the Door. The album showcased a fresh approach to a mixture of musical styles and established the project as psychedelic pop. The album received many excellent reviews online and the project gained a solid fan base worldwide, thanks to its pristine sound and style. “Plumy Tale”, the first single ever released, was nominated by Joe Tangari as one of the top 50 songs on Pitchfork in 2011, and “Marmalade Kids” was chosen as song of the day by NPR. After touring Italy and Europe, Dumbo Gets Mad released a new album in 2013, Quantum Leap. This album was even more textured than the previous one and explored various musical genres, resulting in a mind-blowing psychedelic jam. Dumbo Gets Mad performed with bands such as Neon Indian and Black Lips, and one of the singles on this album, “Indian Food”, became very popular and defined the band's sound. Thank You Neil, released in 2015, was a more soulful album inspired by American astrophysicist Neil deGrasse Tyson. The live recorded album had a more elegant and minimal production style and received wonderful reviews (Stereogum, Vice ...). After four years of hiatus, Dumbo Gets Mad released a new single “Makes You Fly” with the French label “Nice Guys” in 2019 as a preview of a new full-length album. “Things Are Random And Time Is Speeding Up” came out in February 2021 and confirmed the psychedelic nature of the project. In early 2020 Dumbo Gets Mad started a North American tour but had to stop it due to the pandemic. The tour resumed March 2023.

== Discography ==
=== Albums ===
- 2011: Elephants at the Door, Bad Panda Records // Released: 16 February 2011
- 2013: Quantum Leap, Bad Panda Records // Released: 6 February 2013
- 2015: Thank You Neil, Bad Panda Records // Released: 4 December 2015
- 2021: Things Are Random and Time Is Speeding Up, Dumbo Records // Released: 3 February 2021
- 2025: FIVE EGGS

=== Singles ===
- 2010: "Plumy Tale" (Joe Tangari's Pitchfork top 50 - 2010)
- 2011: "Marmelade Kids" (NPR Song of the day - 29 April 2011)
- 2012: Viaje Astral feat. Venice (Red Bull Music Academy video preview)
- 2012: "Radical Leap"
- 2012: "Bam Bam"
- 2012: "Crystal Balls on Roll"
- 2015: "Misanthropulsar"
- 2015: "Andromedian Girl"
- 2019: "Makes You Fly"
- 2019: "Voodoo on Gold"

== Live Band members ==
- Luca Bergomi - vocals, guitar
- Carlotta Menozzi - vocals
- Lorenzo Rotteglia – drums
- Ivan Torelli - Bass

Former live members

- Alessandro "Gervasa" Corradi - bass
- Andrea Scarfone - bass
- Bruno Melegari – drums
- Lorenzo Pioppi - drums
- Venice - keyboards
- Caterina Sforza - Vocals
- Hiroko Hacci - Vocals
- Massimiliano Savino - keyboards
- Angelo Astore- keyboards
