= Dali, Fujian =

Dali 大历镇
- Town
- Location in Fujian Dali (China)
- Coordinates: 26°53′6″N 118°0′22″E
- Country: People's Republic of China
- Province: Fujian
- Prefecture-level city: Nanping
- County: Shunchang County
- Time zone: UTC+8 (China Standard)

Dali (Chinese: 大历; pinyin: Dàlì) is a town under the administration of Shunchang County, Fujian, China. As of 2020, it administers Dali Residential Community and the following eight villages:

- Dali Village
- Xiadian Village (下店村)
- Xiuwu Village (秀吴村)
- Lidun Village (立墩村)
- Longtou Village (龙头村)
- Xiakeng Village (下坑村)
- Tianhou Village (田后村)
- Qianyang Village (前洋村)

== See also ==
- List of township-level divisions of Fujian
