= Mourir sur scène =

1983 song by Dalida

Song by Dalida

from the album Les p'tits mots
- Language: French
- Released: April 20, 1983
- Recorded: 1983
- Studio: CBE
- Genre: Chanson; synth-pop
- Length: 3:30
- Label: International Shows
- Composer: Jeff Barnel
- Lyricist: Michel Jouveaux
- Producer: Orlando

"Mourir sur scène" (transl. "To Die on Stage") is a 1983 song by Dalida, written by Michel Jouveaux and Jeff Barnel, and is often recognized as her most iconic late-career song. Today, it is widely considered to be one of the most popular French songs in music history.

The song, not anticipated as a success, was published in the B-side of the album Les p'tits mots, released in 1983. Due to the song's success, however, it would become a staple of Dalida's live repertoire until her final concert in 1987.

Dalida released multiple translations of "Mourir sur scène", including "Born to Sing" in English, released as a single in the United Kingdom in 1984; "Quando nasce un nuovo amore" ("When a New Love Is Born") in Italian; and "Morir cantando" ("To Die Singing") in Spanish.

Ajda Pekkan covered the song in Turkish in 1985 as "Bir gece sahnesi" ("One Night on the Stage"). Shirley Bassey covered the English version "Born to Sing" in 1986.
