= Dali Jazi =

Tunisian politician, jurist and political scientist

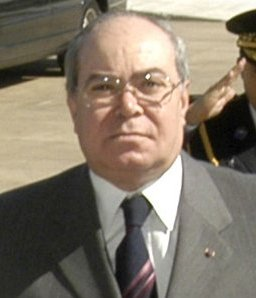
Dali Jazi

Dali Jazi (Arabic: الدالي الجازي / ALA-LC: ad-Dālī al-Jāzī; December 7, 1942 – March 9, 2007) was a Tunisian politician, jurist, and political scientist. He studied at Panthéon-Assas University. He served variously as minister of defense, minister with responsibility for human rights, minister of health, and minister of higher education, under president Zine el-Abidine ben Ali.
