= Khalaf Tahuneh =

Khalaf Tahuneh خلف طاهونه
- Village
- Location within Iran
- Coordinates: 30°00′18″N 52°57′04″E
- Country: Iran
- Province: Fars
- County: Marvdasht
- Bakhsh: Central
- Rural District: Naqsh-e Rostam

Population (2016)
  - Total: 1,303
- Time zone: UTC+3:30 (IRST)
  - Summer (DST): UTC+4:30 (IRDT)

Khalaf Tahuneh (Persian: خلف طاهونه, also Romanized as Khalaf Ţāḩūneh, Khalaf Ţāhūneh, and Khalf-e Ţāhūneh; also known as Dālī) is a village in Naqsh-e Rostam Rural District, in the Central District of Marvdasht County, Fars province, Iran. At the 2006 census, its population was 1,196, in 291 families.
