= Danish Audiophile Loudspeaker Industries =

Danish manufacturer of high-end loudspeakers

DALI A/S
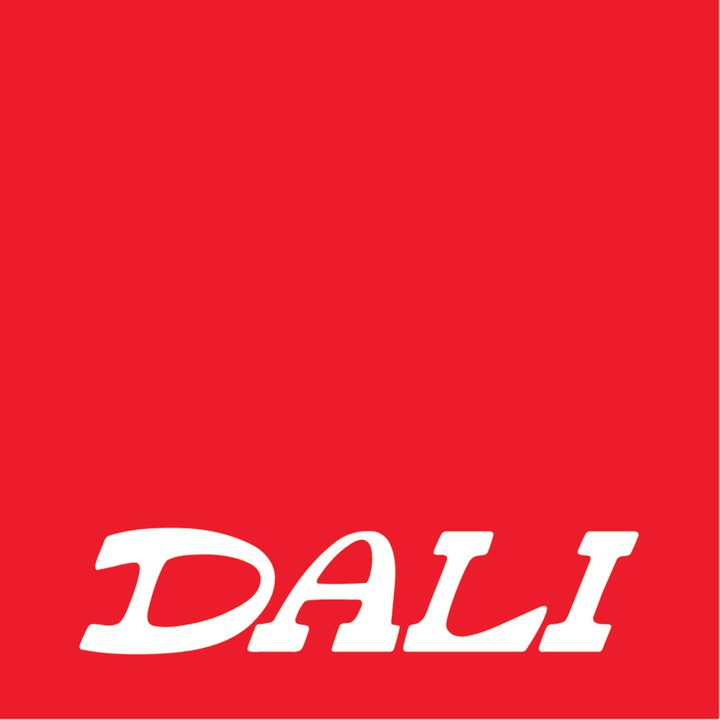
- Company type: Private
- Industry: Consumer electronics
- Founded: 1983 by Peter Lyngdorf
- Headquarters: Nørager, Denmark
- Key people: Lars Worre (CEO), Hother Bak (Acoustics Engineer)
- Products: Hi-Fi and Home theatre Loudspeakers
- Website: www.dali-speakers.com

Danish Audiophile Loudspeaker Industries (DALI A/S) is a Danish manufacturer of high-end loudspeakers. The company was founded in 1983 by Peter Lyngdorf, targeting its products towards the Hi-Fi community. The company is best known for its MegaLine series of high-end loudspeakers.

DALI loudspeakers have traditionally been sold primarily within Scandinavia. As of 2011, DALI is represented in more than 65 countries all over the world.

== History ==
DALI was founded in 1983 by Peter Lyngdorf. It moved to new facilities in Nørager in 1986. Initialty, the companies products were only sold within Scandinavia. DALI first began exporting its products in 1990, and opened its first international office in 2001 in Germany. A second international office was opened in 2005 in the United Kingdom.

== Awards ==
The Fazon F5 also introduced in 2012 received an EISA award for best product audio design 2011-2012, the Epicon 8 received best product High-End Audio 2012-2013 and the Rubicon LCR received an EISA award for best onwall product 2014-2015

=== EISA Awards ===
Model	Year	Category
Ikon 6 MK2	2010-2011	Loudspeaker
Fazon F5	2011-2012	Audio Design
Epicon 8	2012-2013	High-End Audio
Kubik Free	2013-2014	Wireless Speaker System
Rubicon LCR	2014-2015	On-Wall Loudspeakers System
