= Dali railway station =

Dali railway station may refer to:

- Dali railway station (Yunnan), in Yunnan, China
- Dali railway station (Shaanxi), on the Datong–Xi'an Passenger Railway in Shaanxi, China
- Dali railway station (Yilan), on the TRA Yilan line in Toucheng, Yilan County, Taiwan
