= Dali, Izeh =

Dali دلي
- Village
- Location within Iran
- Coordinates: 31°54′39″N 50°00′06″E
- Country: Iran
- Province: Khuzestan
- County: Izeh
- Bakhsh: Central
- Rural District: Howmeh-ye Sharqi

Population (2006)
  - Total: 84
- Time zone: UTC+3:30 (IRST)
  - Summer (DST): UTC+4:30 (IRDT)

Dali (Persian: دلي, also Romanized as Dalī) is a village in Howmeh-ye Sharqi Rural District, in the Central District of Izeh County, Khuzestan Province, Iran. At the 2006 census, its population was 84, in 17 families.
