= Co'Sang =

Italian hip hop duo

- Origin: Naples, Italy
- Years active: 1997–2012; 2024–present
- Labels: Poesia Cruda; Universal
- Members: Ntò; Luchè

Co'Sang ('With the Blood' in Neapolitan) is a hip hop duo formed by rappers Ntò and Luchè.

== Background ==
Co'Sang formed in Naples in 1997 as a group also consisting of rappers Denè e Dayana. Remained as a duo, in 2005 they released their first album, Chi more pe' mme, which included the hit single "Int'o rione". After another album, in 2012 they split to pursue solo careers.

In May 2024, the duo announced their reunion with a short film published on Instagram. Their comeback concert, held on 17 September 2024 in Piazza del Plebiscito in Naples, went sold out in just 15 minutes. In August, they released a new album, Dinastia, which had Marracash, Geolier, Club Dogo and Liberato as guests. The album debuted at the first place on the Italian hit parade.

== Discography ==
Studio albums

- Chi more pe' mme (2005)
- Vita bona (2009)
- Dinastia (2024)
