= Dalli, Tanout =

Dalli Dali
- town
- Location in Niger
- Coordinates: 14°32′05″N 8°22′17″E
- Country: Niger
- Region: Zinder
- Department: Tanout
- Municipality: Tanout Commune

Population (2011)
  - Total: 423
- Time zone: UTC+1

Dalli (Dali) was a large town in the Zinder Region of Niger. It is now mostly abandoned ruins as the Sahara and the Sahel continue to dry up. As of 2011 census, the remaining inhabitants form three separate villages, one with 129 people (#22705), the second with 242 people (#22706), and the third with 52 people (#22894).

The 2010 drought was particularly severe in Dalli.
