= Mercurio (album) =

Italian rapper's second studio album, Mercurio

Studio album by Emis Killa
- Released: 22 October 2013
- Genre: Italian hip hop
- Producer: Dj Fish, Marco Zangirolami, Alessandro Erba, Don Joe, Big Joe, Enrico Caruso, Emis Killa

Emis Killa chronology
| L'erba cattiva | Mercurio | Terza Stagione |

Mercurio (en:Mercury) is the second studio album by Italian rapper Emis Killa.

== Track listing ==
1. Wow – 3:06
2. Scordarmi chi ero – 3:52
3. MB45 – 3:04
4. Lettera dall'inferno – 3:44
5. A cena dai tuoi (feat. J-Ax) – 3:06
6. Soli (Assieme) – 3:25
7. Essere umano (feat. Skin) – 3:29
8. Blocco Boyz (feat. G.Soave & Duellz) – 4:54
9. Va bene – 3:00
10. Gli stessi di sempre – 3:25
11. Straight Rydah – 3:39
12. Fratelli a metà – 3:37
13. Vietnam Flow (feat. Salmo) – 3:43
14. La testa vuota (feat. Max Pezzali) – 4:18
15. Mercurio – 3:43

Bonus track on iTunes

1. Lettera dall'inferno (Bonus Version) – 3:21
