= Emis Killa =

Italian rapper (born 1989)

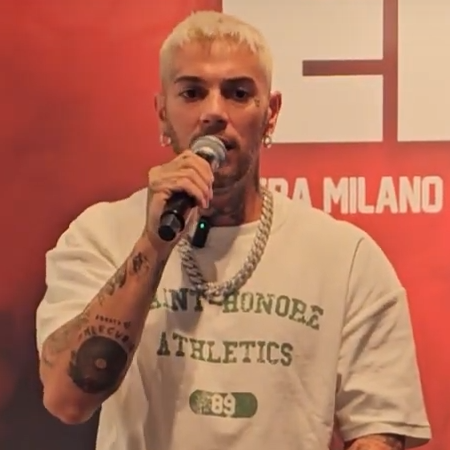
- Emis Killa in 2024
- Born: Emiliano Rudolf Giambelli; 14 November 1989 (age 36); Vimercate, Lombardy, Italy
- Occupation: Rapper
- Years active: 2006–present
- Height: 1.77 m (5 ft 10 in)
- Website: www.emiskilla.it

Emiliano Rudolf Giambelli (born 14 November 1989), known professionally as Emis Killa, is an Italian rapper.

== Early and personal life ==
Emiliano Giambelli was born in Vimercate, Lombardy, to a Sicilian mother from Palermo who worked as a metalworker and a Lombard father who also performed as a musician. His father struggled with bipolar disorder and died due to cardiac arrest in 2010.

Since late 2019, Emis Killa has been in a relationship with fashion model and designer Martina Bottiglieri. He has a daughter, Perla Blue, born on 17 August 2018 to his former partner Tiffany Fortini, and a son, Romeo, born 18 June 2024 to Bottiglieri.

== Career ==
=== 2007–2010: The beginnings ===
In 2007, at just 17 years old, Emis Killa was the winner of an Italian freestyle competition called TecnichePerfette.

=== 2024–present ===
In December 2024, Emis Killa was announced as one of the participants in the Sanremo Music Festival 2025. He was due to compete with the song "Demoni". However, he ultimately withdrew from the competition in late January amid legal issues. In December 2025, he released the album Musica triste, which was certified gold. In 2026, his single "LA TESTA GIRA", recorded with Anitta and Fred De Palma, topped the Italian singles chart. The song continued dominating the charts into the summer.

== Awards and nominations ==
On 5 May 2012, Emis Killa won "Best emerging artist of 2012" at the TRL awards.

On 12 December 2012, during the Hip Hop Awards in the category of Best New Artist and Best Collaboration he won along with Club Dogo, J-Ax and Marracash with his song "Se il mondo fosse".

In January 2015, Mercurio received a nomination for IMPALA's European Independent Album of the Year Award.

== Discography ==
- Il peggiore (2011)
- L'erba cattiva (2012)
- Mercurio (2013)
- Terza stagione (2016)
- Supereroe (2018)
- 17 with Jake La Furia (2020)
- Effetto notte (2023)
- Musica triste (2025)
