= Luchè =

Italian rapper

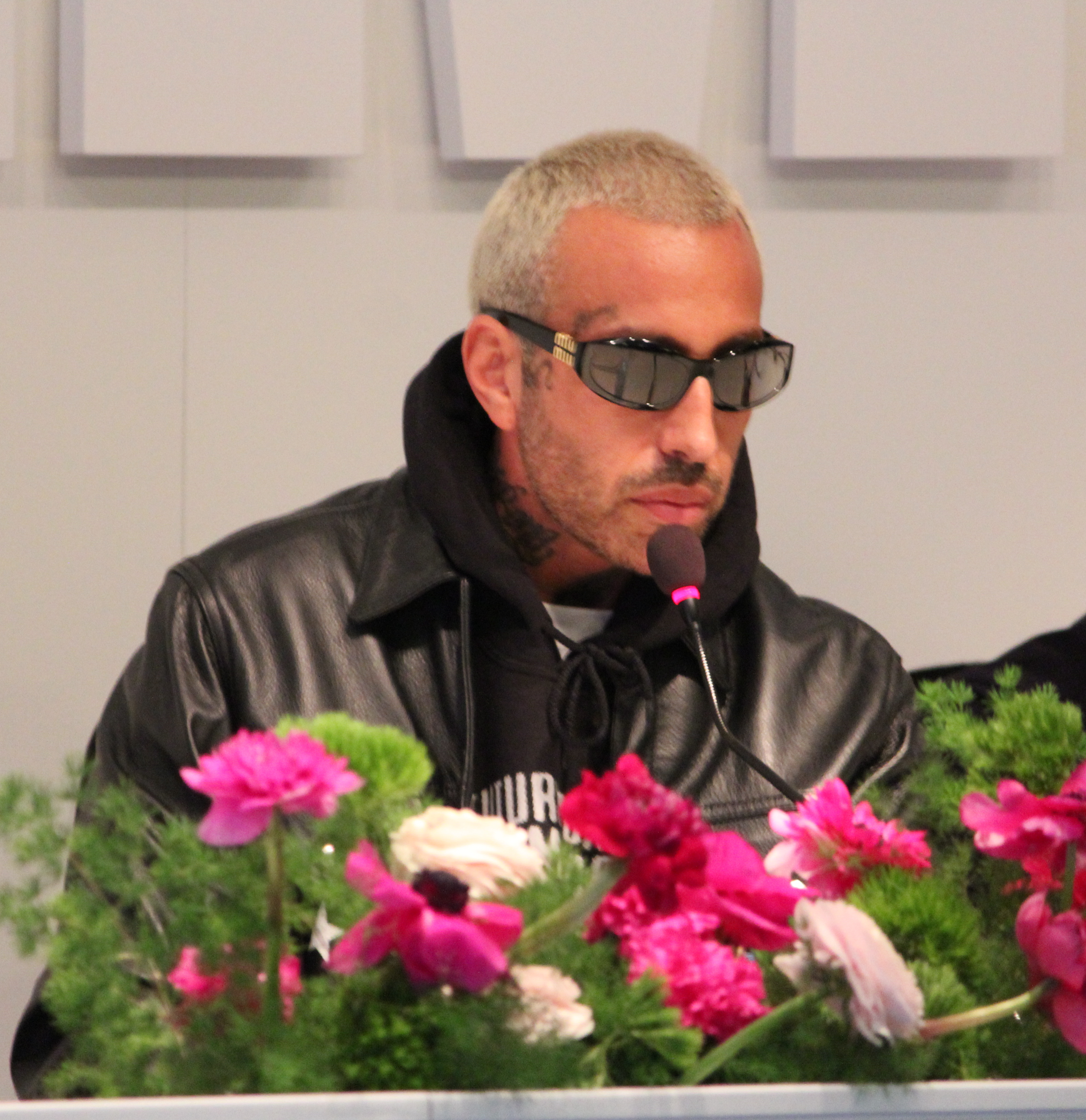
- Luchè in February 2026
- Born: Luca Imprudente; 7 January 1981 (age 45); Naples, Italy
- Occupation: Rapper
- Musical career
- Genres: Hip hop; trap
- Labels: Universal; Columbia; Warner Music Italy
- Member of: Co'Sang

Luca Imprudente (born 7 January 1981), known professionally as Luchè, is an Italian rapper and record producer.

== Life and career ==
Born in the Marianella suburb of Naples, Luchè started his professional career as a member of the hip hop duo Co'Sang. Following the disbandment of the duo in 2012, the same year he released his first solo work, the album L1. As of February 2024, he released 5 solo albums, and his works have earned him 18 platinum discs and 9 gold discs. In May 2024, Co'Sang reunited and released a new album, Dinastia.

In 2019, Luchè founded a label, BFM Music. Artists on the label include Geolier, MV Killa, and Vale Lambo. In 2020, he released an autobiography, Il giorno dopo ("The day after").

In 2025, Luchè released the album Il mio lato peggiore, from which the track "Ginevra" featuring Geolier reached number one in Italy. On 30 November 2025, he was announced among the participants of the Sanremo Music Festival 2026. He competed with the song "Labirinto".

Luchè lives between Naples, London and New York, where he opened two pizzerias.

== Discography ==
Albums

- L1 (2012)
- L2 (2014)
- Malammore (2016)
- Potere (2018)
- Dove volano le aquile (2022)
- Il mio lato peggiore (2025)
