= Guè discography =

This is the discography for Italian rapper Guè.

== Studio albums ==
List of studio albums, with chart positions and certifications
Title	Album details	Peak chart positions		Certifications
Title	Album details	ITA	SWI	Certifications
Il ragazzo d'oro	Released: 14 June 2011; Label: Universal; Format: CD, LP, digital download, streaming	5	—	FIMI: Platinum
Bravo ragazzo	Released: 4 June 2013; Label: Universal; Format: CD, LP, DVD, digital download, streaming	2	69	FIMI: 3× Platinum
Vero	Released: 23 June 2015; Label: Universal, Def Jam; Format: CD, digital download, streaming	1	31	FIMI: 2× Platinum
Santeria (with Marracash)	Released: 24 June 2016; Label: Universal; Format: CD, LP, digital download, streaming	1	12	FIMI: 5× Platinum
Gentleman	Released: 30 June 2017; Label: Universal, Def Jam; Format: CD, LP, digital download, streaming	1	26	FIMI: 3× Platinum
Sinatra	Released: 14 September 2018; Label: Island, Universal; Format: CD, LP, digital download, streaming	1	34	FIMI: 3× Platinum
Mr. Fini	Released: 26 June 2020; Label: Island; Format: CD, LP, digital download, streaming	1	7	FIMI: 4× Platinum
Guesus	Released: 10 December 2021; Label: Island; Format: CD, LP, digital download, streaming	1	24	FIMI: 3× Platinum
Madreperla	Released: 13 January 2023; Label: Island; Format: CD, LP, digital download, streaming	1	3	FIMI: 2× Platinum
Tropico del Capricorno	Released: 10 January 2025; Label: Island; Format: Digital download, streaming	1	3	FIMI: 2× Platinum

== Live albums ==
Title	Album details
Bravo ragazzo live	Released: 1 April 2014; Label: Universal; Format: CD, digital download
Santeria Live (with Marracash)	Released: 31 March 2017; Label: Universal; Format: CD, DVD, digital download

== Vinyl compilations ==
Title	Album details
Vinyl Box Collection	Released: 23 October 2017; Label: Universal, Def Jam; Format: LP

== Mixtapes ==
List of mixtapes, with chart positions and certifications
Title	Album details	Peak chart positions		Certifications
Title	Album details	ITA	SWI	Certifications
Fastlife Mixtape Vol. 1 (with DJ Harsh)	Released: 2006; Label: Oblio; Format: digital download	—	—	
Fastlife Mixtape Vol. 2 - Faster Life	Released: 11 October 2009; Label: independent; Format: digital download	—	—	
Rimo da quando Mixtape	Released: 12 November 2010; Label: independent; Format: digital download	—	—	
Fastlife Mixtape Vol. 3	Released: 20 January 2012; Label: Tanta Roba; Format: CD, digital download	—	—	
Guengsta Rap	Released: 29 March 2013; Label: Tanta Roba; Format: digital download	—	—	
Double Dragon Mixtape (with Marracash)	Released: 28 May 2016; Label: Universal; Format: digital download	—	—	
Fastlife 4	Released: 9 April 2021; Label: Island; Format: CD, LP, digital download	1	11	FIMI: 2× Platinum
Fastlife 5: Audio Luxury (with Cookin' Soul)	Released: 9 January 2026; Label: Island; Format: CD, LP, digital download	1	12	

== Extended plays ==
Title	EP details
Hashishinz Sound Vol. 1	Released: 11 April 2005; Label: Oblio; Format: CD, digital download
Gelida estate	Released: 21 June 2019; Label: Island; Format: CD, digital download

== Singles ==
=== As lead artist ===
List of singles as lead artist, with chart positions, album name and certifications
Single	Year	Peak chart positions	Certifications	Album
Single	Year	ITA	Certifications	Album
"Non lo spegnere" (featuring Entics)	2011	—		Il ragazzo d'oro
"Ultimi giorni"	2011	—		Il ragazzo d'oro
"R.E.B." (with Crookers)	2012	—		Non-album single
"Business"	2013	7	FIMI: Gold	Bravo ragazzo
"Rose nere"	2013	5	FIMI: Gold	Bravo ragazzo
"Bravo ragazzo"	2013	9		Bravo ragazzo
"Tornare indietro" (featuring Arlissa)	2013	90		Bravo ragazzo
"Le bimbe piangono"	2015	—		Vero
"Interstellar" (featuring Akon)	2015	69	FIMI: Gold	Vero
"Equilibrio"	2015	—		Vero
"Fiumi di champagne" (featuring Peppino di Capri)	2015	—		Vero (Royal Edition)
"Nulla accade" (with Marracash)	2016	16	FIMI: 2× Platinum	Santeria
"Insta Lova" (with Marracash)	2016	24	FIMI: 4× Platinum	Santeria
"Ninja" (with Marracash)	2016	62		Santeria (Voodoo Edition)
"Scooteroni RMX" (with Marracash featuring Sfera Ebbasta)	2016	62	FIMI: 2× Platinum	Santeria (Voodoo Edition)
"Trinità"	2017	6	FIMI: Platinum	Non-album single
"Non ci sei tu"	2017	25	FIMI: Gold	Gentleman
"T'apposto"	2017	15	FIMI: Gold	Gentleman
"Milionario" (featuring El Micha)	2017	9	FIMI: 2× Platinum	Gentleman
"Lamborghini" (featuring Sfera Ebbasta and Elettra Lamborghini)	2017	1	FIMI: 2× Platinum	Gentleman
"Guersace"	2017	19	FIMI: Platinum	Gentleman
"Punto su di te"	2017	44	FIMI: Gold	Gentleman
"Come se fosse normale"	2018	10		Non-album singles
"Lungomare latino" (featuring Willy William)	2018	26		Non-album singles
"Trap Phone" (featuring Capo Plaza)	2018	1	FIMI: Platinum	Sinatra
"Bling Bling (Oro)"	2018	9	FIMI: 2× Platinum	Sinatra
"3D notte" (with Nashley)	2018	—		Real
"2%" (with Frah Quintale)	2019	4	FIMI: 2× Platinum	Sinatra
"Montenapo" (featuring Lazza)	2019	29	FIMI: Gold	Gelida estate
"Colpo grosso" (with Snik, Capo Plaza and Noizy)	2019	27		Top Boy
"Saigon"	2020	16	FIMI: Gold	Mr. Fini
"Chico" (featuring Rose Villain and Luchè)	2020	5	FIMI: 4× Platinum	Mr. Fini
"25 ore" (featuring Ernia and Shablo)	2020	30	FIMI: Gold	Mr. Fini
"Vita veloce freestyle"	2020	36		Fastlife 4
"Promettimi" (with Blind and Nicola Siciliano)	2021	—		Non-album single
"Too Old to Die Young" (with Shablo)	2021	53		Guesus
"Veleno"	2021	2	FIMI: 2× Platinum	Guesus
"Piango sulla Lambo" (featuring Rose Villain)	2022	3	FIMI: Platinum	Guesus
"Puta" (with SixPM and Ghali)	2023	40		Non-album single
"Oh mamma mia" (with Rose Villain)	2025	1	FIMI: Platinum	Tropico del Capricorno
"Meravigliosa" (with Stadio)	2025	5	FIMI: Gold	Tropico del Capricorno
"Loquito" (with Cookin' Soul and Celine G)	2026	10		Non-album singles
"Cadillac" (with TonyPitony and Shablo)	2026	67		Non-album singles

=== As featured artist ===
List of singles as featured artist, with chart positions, album name and certifications
Single	Year	Peak chart positions	Certifications	Album
Single	Year	ITA	Certifications	Album
"Le leggende non muoiono mai" (Don Joe and Shablo featuring Fabri Fibra, Jake La Furia, Noyz Narcos, Gué Pequeno, Marracash, J-Ax and Francesco Sarcina)	2011	—		Thori & Rocce
"Chi non si arrende" (Claudia Megrè featuring Gué Pequeno)	2012	—		Da domani
"Bastardo" (Karma Krew featuring Gué Pequeno)	2015	—		Uomini come noi
"Speed of Light" (Beata Beatz featuring Gué Pequeno)	2017	—		IAM
"Vengo dal basso" (Laïoung featuring Gué Pequeno)	2017	—		Ave Cesare: veni, vidi, vici
"Tanta roba Anthem" (Gemitaiz featuring Gué Pequeno)	2018	17	FIMI: Gold	Davide
"Nero Bali" (Elodie featuring Michele Bravi and Gué Pequeno)	2018	10	FIMI: 2× Platinum	This Is Elodie
"NYC" (Kevin Payne featuring Gué Pequeno)	2018	—		Non-album single
"Gucci Ski Mask" (Lazza featuring Gué Pequeno)	2019	25	FIMI: Gold	Re Mida
"Pazzeska" (Myss Keta featuring Gué Pequeno)	2019	97		Paprika
"Quanto amore si dà" (Gigi D'Alessio featuring Gué Pequeno)	2019	59		Non-album single
"Fanfare" (Elettra Lamborghini featuring Gué Pequeno)	2019	34	FIMI: Gold	Twerking Queen
"Los Angeles" (The Kolors featuring Gué Pequeno)	2019	96		Non-album singles
"Kriminal" (Shablo featuring Gué Pequeno, Gemitaiz and Samurai Jay)	2020	22		Non-album singles
"Bla Bla" (Anna featuring Gué Pequeno)	2020	45		Non-album singles
"Ti amo, ti odio" (Roshelle featuring Gué Pequeno, Mecna and Shablo)	2021	—		Non-album singles
"Elvis" (Rose Villain featuring Gué Pequeno and Sixpm)	2021	97		Radio Gotham
"Solo lei ha quel che voglio 2021" (Sottotono featuring Gué Pequeno, Marracash and Tiziano Ferro)	2021	51		Originali
"Il doc 2" (VillaBanks featuring Gué Pequeno and Tony Effe)	2022	35		Filtri + nudo
"Toca" (Aka 7even featuring Gué Pequeno)	2022	61		Non-album singles
"Sarabamba" (Massimo Pericolo featuring Gué Pequeno)	2022	—		Non-album singles
"Mafia" (Young Rame featuring Gué Pequeno)	2022	—		Non-album singles
"Come un tuono" (Rose Villain featuring Gué)	2024	1	FIMI: 4× Platinum	Radio Sakura
"Wifey" (Digital Astro featuring Gué)	2024	82		Non-album singles
"Milano Testarossa" (Artie 5ive featuring Gué)	2024	20	FIMI: Platinum	Non-album singles
"SL" (Lex featuring Gué)	2024	—		G.T.K.

== Other selected charted songs ==
List of selected non-single songs, with chart positions, album name and certifications
Single	Year	Peak chart positions	Certifications	Album
Single	Year	ITA	Certifications	Album
"Brivido" (featuring Marracash)	2013	58	FIMI: 5× Platinum	Bravo ragazzo
"Quei bravi ragazzi" (featuring Clementino)	2013	33		Bravo ragazzo
"Salvador Dalí" (with Marracash)	2016	25	FIMI: 2× Platinum	Santeria
"Cosa mia" (with Marracash)	2016	44	FIMI: Gold	Santeria
"Money" (with Marracash)	2016	50	FIMI: Gold	Santeria
"Senza Dio" (with Marracash)	2016	58	FIMI: Gold	Santeria
"Ca$mere" (with Marracash)	2016	52	FIMI: Platinum	Santeria (Voodoo Edition)
"Scarafaggio" (featuring Tony Effe and Frank White)	2017	11	FIMI: Platinum	Gentleman
"Mimmo Flow"	2017	23	FIMI: Gold	Gentleman
"Relaxxx" (featuring Marracash)	2017	10	FIMI: Platinum	Gentleman
"Oro giallo" (featuring Luchè)	2017	28	FIMI: Platinum	Gentleman
"La malaeducazione" (with Enzo Avitabile)	2017	38	FIMI: Gold	Gentleman
"Hugh Guefner"	2018	29		Sinatra
"Borsello" (featuring Sfera Ebbasta and DrefGold)	2018	1	FIMI: Platinum	Sinatra
"Claro" (featuring Tony Effe and Prynce)	2018	2	FIMI: Gold	Sinatra
"Bam Bam" (featuring Cosculluela and El Micha)	2018	25		Sinatra
"Modalità aereo" (featuring Marracash and Luchè)	2018	5	FIMI: Platinum	Sinatra
"Babysitter"	2018	27		Sinatra
"Sobrio" (featuring Elodie)	2018	30		Sinatra
"Doppio whisky" (featuring Mahmood)	2018	91		Sinatra
"Niente photo"	2019	34		Gelida estate
"Bamba"	2019	36		Gelida estate
"L'amico degli amici"	2020	26		Mr. Fini
"Parte di me" (featuring Carl Brave)	2020	24	FIMI: Gold	Mr. Fini
"Immortale" (featuring Sfera Ebbasta)	2020	6	FIMI: Gold	Mr. Fini
"Tardissimo" (with Marracash and Mahmood)	2020	15	FIMI: Gold	Mr. Fini
"Medellin" (featuring Lazza)	2020	10	FIMI: Gold	Mr. Fini
"Ti levo le collane" (featuring Paky)	2020	17	FIMI: Platinum	Mr. Fini
"Stanza 106"	2020	35		Mr. Fini
"Ti ricordi?"	2020	37		Mr. Fini
"Lifestyle"	2021	6	FIMI: Gold	Fastlife 4
"Alex" (with Lazza and Salmo)	2021	7	FIMI: Gold	Fastlife 4
"Champagne 4 the Pain" (featuring Noyz Narcos and Gemitaiz)	2021	10	FIMI: Gold	Fastlife 4
"Gangster of Love" (featuring Rick Ross)	2021	12		Guesus
"Blitz" (featuring Geolier)	2021	4	FIMI: Gold	Guesus
"Daytona" (featuring Marracash)	2021	8		Guesus
"Nessuno" (featuring Coez)	2021	13		Guesus
"Futura ex" (featuring Ernia)	2021	9	FIMI: Gold	Guesus
"Senza sogni" (featuring Elisa)	2021	25		Guesus
"Fredda, triste, pericolosa" (featuring Franco126)	2021	24		Guesus
"Prefissi"	2023	10		Madreperla
"Tuta Maphia" (with Paky)	2023	7		Madreperla
"Mi hai capito o no?"	2023	15		Madreperla
"Cookies n' Cream" (with Anna and Sfera Ebbasta)	2023	1	FIMI: 4× Platinum	Madreperla
"Need U 2Nite" (with Massimo Pericolo)	2023	4		Madreperla
"Léon (The Professional)"	2023	16		Madreperla
"Free" (with Marracash and Rkomi)	2023	8		Madreperla
"Mollami Pt.2"	2023	11		Madreperla
"Lontano dai guai" (with Mahmood)	2023	21		Madreperla
"Chiudi gli occhi"	2023	22		Madreperla
"Da 1K in Su" (featuring Benny the Butcher)	2023	30		Madreperla
"Capa tosta" (with Napoleone)	2023	39		Madreperla
"Vibe"	2025	4	FIMI: Platinum	Tropico del Capricorno
"Da 0 a 100" (with Shiva)	2025	9		Tropico del Capricorno
"Akrapovič" (with Artie 5ive)	2025	3	FIMI: Gold	Tropico del Capricorno
"Gazelle" (with Ele A)	2025	21		Tropico del Capricorno
"Nei tuoi Skinny" (with Frah Quintale)	2025	24		Tropico del Capricorno
"La G La U La E Pt.3"	2025	22		Tropico del Capricorno
"Le tipe"	2025	26		Tropico del Capricorno
"Pain Is Love" (with Harry Fraud)	2025	20		Tropico del Capricorno
"Movie" (with Geolier)	2025	18		Tropico del Capricorno
"Kalispera" (with Ghali and Tony Effe)	2025	28		Tropico del Capricorno
"Nei DM" (with Ernia and Tormento)	2025	36		Tropico del Capricorno
"Non lo so" (with Chiello)	2025	14		Tropico del Capricorno
"Astronauta"	2025	38		Tropico del Capricorno

== Guest appearances ==
Title	Year	Other artist(s)	Album
"Costi quel che costi"	1998	ATPC, Il Circolo, Sacre Scuole	50 Emcee's Pt 1
"Casbah Flow"	2004	Marracash	PMC vs. Club Dogo - The Official Mixtape
"Freestyle"	2005	Inoki	The Newkingztape Vol. 1
"Grand Prix"	2006	MetroStars, Supa	Cookies and Milk
"Traffic"	2006	Fuoco Negli Occhi	Graffi sul vetro
"Lavaggio del cervello"	2006	Gel, Metal Carter, Vincenzo da Via Anfossi	I più corrotti
"Luce (Remix)"	2006	Chief, Reverendo	Crash Test Vol. 1
"Real TV"	2007	Noyz Narcos, Vincenzo da Via Anfossi	Verano zombie
"Tu mi vedrai"	2007	Ted Bundy, Jake La Furia	Molotov Cocktail
"Fireman"	2007	Ted Bundy	Molotov Cocktail
"Fattore wow"	2008	Marracash, J-Ax	Marracash
"Tutta roba mia"	2008	Sgarra, Don Joe	Disco imperiale
"Guerrieri del microfono"	2008	Babaman	Dinamite
"Non ce provà"	2008	Santo Trafficante	Ghiaccio - Il principio
"Criminal Minded"	2008	El Presidente, Tormento	Siamesi Brothers
"Rap n' Roll"	2009	J-Ax	Rap n' Roll
"Fai quello che vuoi"	2010	Daniele Vit	La mia città
"Bros B4 Hoes"	2010	Luchè, Corrado, Daniele Vit	Poesia cruda Mixtape
"Capo status"	2010	Emis Killa	Champagne e spine
"Regime D.O.G.O."	2011	Ted Bundy	Centodieci e lode
"Album & Mixtape"	2011	Amir Issaa	Radio Inossidabile Vol. 2
"Pulula"	2011	Izio Sklero, Marracash	Inizio
"S.E.N.I.C.A.R."	2011	Marracash	King del Rap
"Blues"	2011	Fedez, Marracash	Il mio primo disco da venduto
"Ognuno per sé"	2012	Emis Killa	L'erba cattiva
"Lirico terrorista"	2012	Bassi Maestro	Stanno tutti bene
"Eco"	2012	Two Fingerz	Mouse Music
"On Fire"	2012	Luchè, Jake La Furia	L1
"Paper Queen"	2012	Ensi, Biggie Bash	Era tutto un sogno
"Pensavo fosse amore invece…"	2013	Fedez	Sig. Brainwash - L'arte di accontentare
"Nella mia macchina"	2013	Stiv	Stiwipedia
"Tutta la notte"	2013	Francesco Sarcina	Io
"Never"	2013	Fritz da Cat, Nitro, MadMan	Fritz
"Esercizio di stile"	2013	Jake La Furia, Marracash	Musica commerciale
"Freddezza"	2014	Deleterio, Marracash, Attila	Dadaismo
"Imprenditori"	2014	Moreno	Incredibile
"Champagne"	2014	Franco Ricciardi	Figli e figliastri
"Rodeo"	2014	Fred De Palma	Lettera al successo
"Essa nun tene problemi"	2014	Ntò, Palù	Numero 9
"Giovane disorientato"	2014	Rocco Hunt	'A verità
"Sempre in giro"	2014	Gemitaiz, MadMan	Kepler
"Di nascosto"	2015	Marracash	Status
"E tu ci convivi"	2015	Fabri Fibra	Squallor
"Boom"	2015	Clementino, Fabri Fibra	Miracolo!
"Anime inquiete"	2015	Tormento	Dentro e fuori
"Superman"	2015	Emis Killa	Keta Music Vol. 2
"Una moneta e un sogno"	2015	Rocco Hunt, J-Ax	SignorHunt
"Ce l'hanno con me"	2016	Gemitaiz	Nonostante tutto
"Bello"	2016	Luchè	Malammore
"Fratm"	2016	Ntò	Col sangue
"El machico"	2017	Dark Polo Gang	Twins
"Disgusting"	2017	Ernia	Come uccidere un usignolo
"Familia"	2017	The RRR	Nuovo impero
"Pezzi"	2017	The Night Skinny, Rkomi	Pezzi
"6 A.M."	2017	The Night Skinny, Izi	Pezzi
"Mamacita"	2018	Vegas Jones	Bellaria
"Medusa RMX"	2018	Vale Lambo	Medusa (Deluxe)
"LV & Balmain"	2018	Luchè	Potere
"3 di notte"	2018	Nashley	Real
"Adios"	2018	Emis Killa	Supereroe
"Spunte blu"	2018	Carl Brave	Notti brave (After)
"XNX RMX"	2018	Sfera Ebbasta	Rockstar (Popstar Edition)
"Soldi" (Remix)	2019	Mahmood	Gioventù bruciata
"Frecciarossa"	2019	Side Baby	Arturo
"Splash RMX"	2019	Dark Polo Gang, Luchè	Trap Lovers (Reloaded)
"Saluti"	2019	The Night Skinny, Fabri Fibra, Rkomi	Mattoni
"Mattoni"	2019	The Night Skinny, Noyz Narcos, Ernia, Shiva, Achille Lauro, Geolier, Side Baby, Taxi B, Lazza	Mattoni
"Amo ma chi t sap"	2019	Geolier, MV Killa	Emanuele
"Fiori"	2019	Gemitaiz, MadMan, Marracash	Scatola near
"Capi della trap"	2019	FSK Satellite	FSK Trapshit Revenge
"Qualcosa in cui credere - Lo scheletro"	2019	Marracash	Persona
"Giro d'Italia"	2020	DrefGold	Elo
"Moncler"	2020	Lazza, Pyrex	J
"Fake Dm"	2020	Carl Brave	Coraggio
"Punto debole"	2020	Mecna	Mentre nessuno guarda
"Chinatown"	2020	Speranza	L'ultimo a morire
"Miami Ladies"	2020	Izi, Elettra Lamborghini	Riot
"Tik Tok"	2020	Sfera Ebbasta, Marracash	Famoso
"Colpa tua"	2021	Mace, Venerus	OBE
"Dimmi ora"	2021	Madame	Madame
"Polka 2"	2021	Rosa Chemical, Ernia	Forever and Ever
"Vacci piano"	2021	Random	Nuvole
"Nada"	2021	DJ Tayone, Capo Plaza	Djungle
"Escort Lover"	2021	Tony Effe	Untouchable
"Non sai niente"	2021	Shiva	Dolce vita
"Uana"	2021	Fred De Palma	Unico
"YHWH"	2021	Salmo	Flop
"Solido"	2021	Rocco Hunt	Rivoluzione
"Infinity Love"	2021	Marracash	Noi, loro, gli altri
"Mortier"	2021	Rohff	Grand Monsieur
"No Ratz"	2022	Noyz Narcos, Capo Plaza	Virus
"Iride"	2022	Irama	Il giorno in cui ho smesso di pensare
"Vivi o muori"	2022	Paky	Salvatore
"Cocaine"	2022	Fabri Fibra, Salmo	Caos
"Addio"	2022	Luchè, Noyz Narcos	Dove volano le aquile
"Au Revoir"	2022	Fred De Palma, Rose Villain, JVLI	PLC Tape 1
"Piena"	2022	Myss Keta	Club Topperia
"Compare"	2022	Cancun, Lazza	Cancun
"Doppio hublot"	2022	The Night Skinny, Baby Gang	Botox
"Coki"	2022	The Night Skinny, Noyz Narcos, Tony Effe, Ketama126	Botox
"Per la strada"	2022	The Night Skinny, Rkomi, Coez	Botox
"BTX Posse"	2022	The Night Skinny, Ernia, Lazza, Coez, Geolier, Tony Effe, Paky, MamboLosco	Botox
"Bastava la metà"	2022	Ernia, Gaia	Io non ho paura
