= List of artists who reached number one on the Italian Singles Chart =

This is a list of recording artists who have reached number one on the singles chart in Italy since Federazione Industria Musicale Italiana (FIMI) began reporting charts on 4 January 1997.

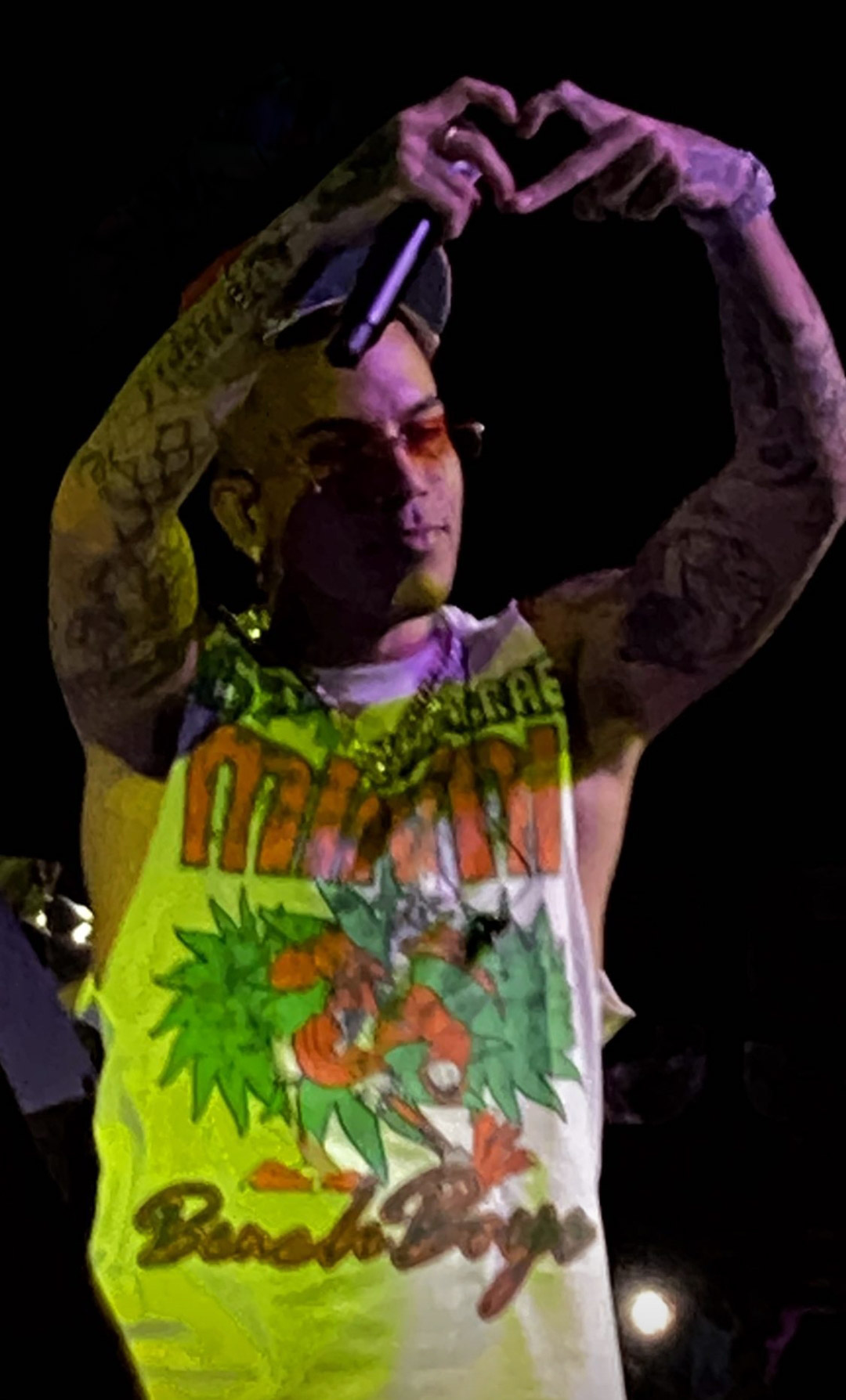
With a total of 33 songs, Sfera Ebbasta holds the record for the most number-ones songs during the FIMI era and also hold most by Male and Italian.

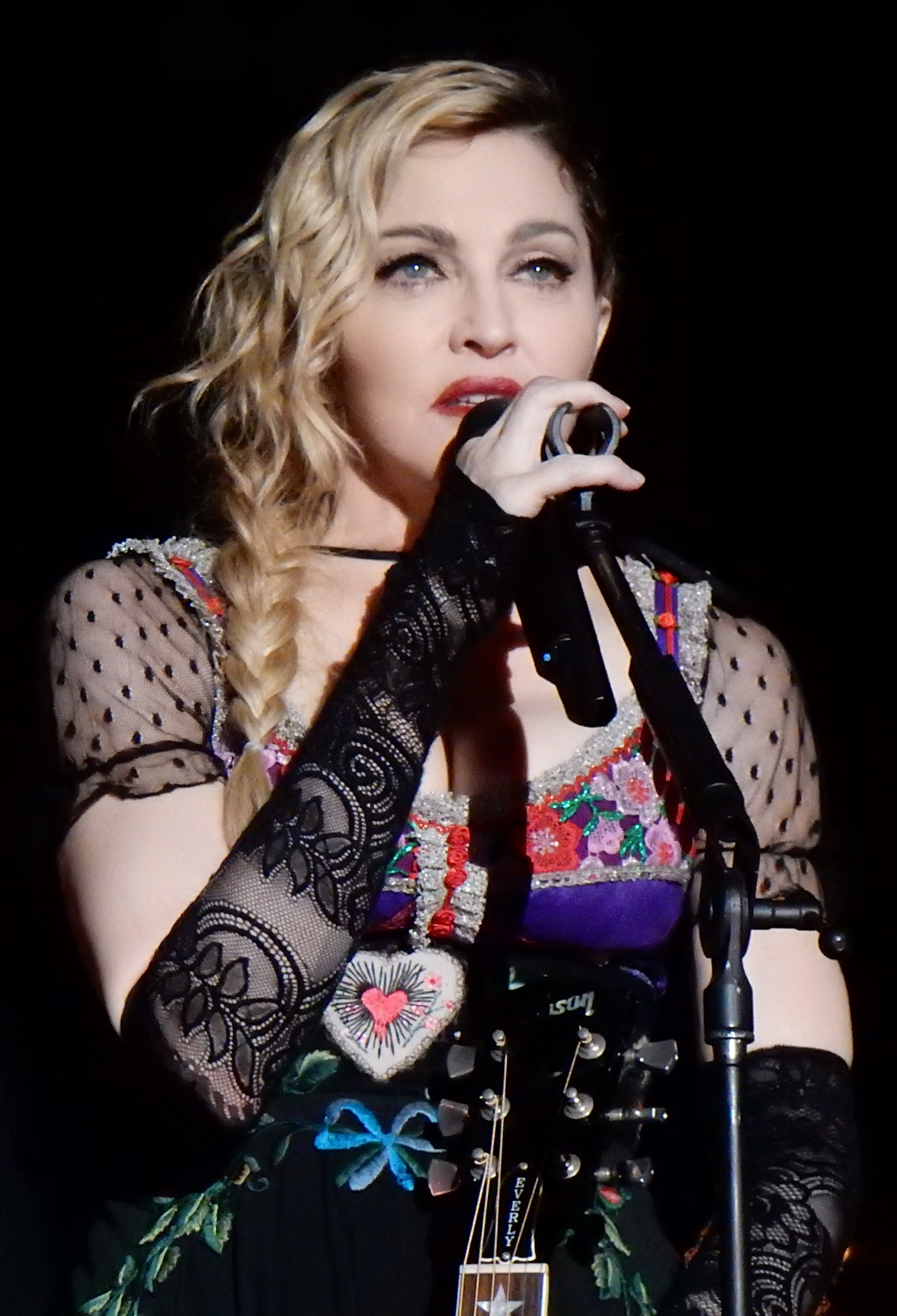
Madonna holds the record for a female artist, with 12. With an additional 11 number ones on the Musica e dischi chart (prior to the FIMI), she ammased a total of 23 number-one songs in Italy.

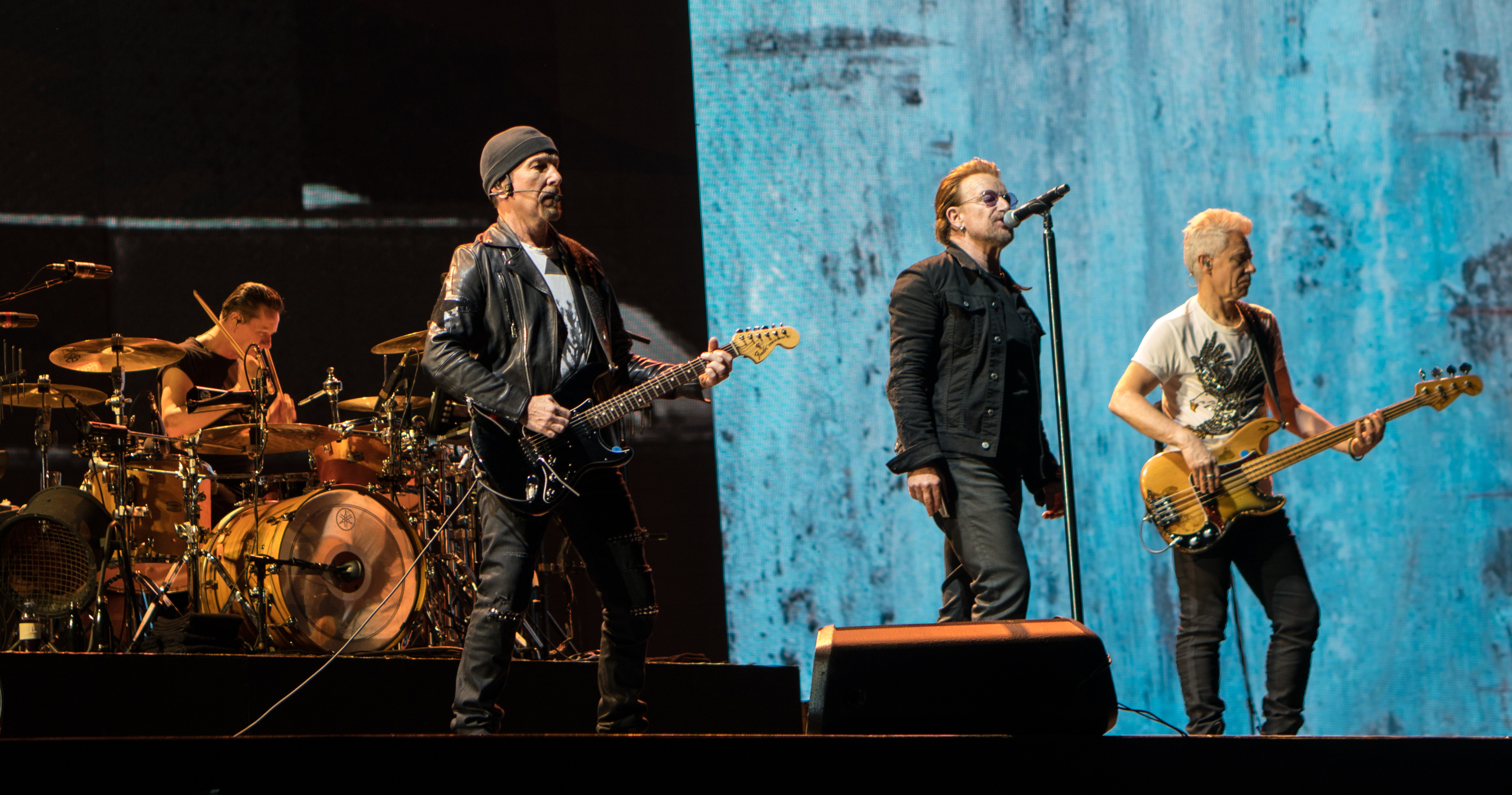
U2 hold the record for the most number-one songs by a group.

- All acts are listed alphabetically.
- Solo artists are alphabetized by last name, Groups by group name excluding "A", "An", and "The".
- Each act's total of number-one singles is shown after their name.
- All artists who are mentioned in song credits are listed here; this includes one-time pairings of otherwise solo artists and those appearing as featured. Members of a group who reached number one are excluded, unless they hit number one as a solo artist.

== 0–9 ==
- Artie 5ive (1)
- 112 (1)
- 2 Eivissa (1)
- 2Pac (1)
- II Volo (1)
- 50 Cent (1)
- 883 (1)

== A ==
- Gigi D'Alessio (1)
- Adele (5)
- Aerosmith (1)
- Alessandra Amoroso (3)
- Alexandra Stan (1)
- Alexia (1)
- Alfa (2)
- Alizée (1)
- All Saints (1)
- Tori Amos (1)
- Anastacia (3)
- Anastasio (1)
- Andry the Hitmaker (1)
- Anggun (1)
- Anitta (1)
- Anna (6)
- Annalisa (2)
- Aqua (1)
- Arisa (3)
- Artisti Uniti per l'Abruzzo (1)
- Asaf Avidan (1)
- Ava (1)
- Aventura (1)
- Avicii (1)

== B ==
- Backstreet Boys (2)
- Bad Bunny (1)
- Claudio Baglioni (1)
- Band Aid 20 (1)
- Baby Gang (1)
- Baby K (1)
- Claudio Baglioni (1)
- Bastard Sons of Dioniso (1)
- J Balvin (5)
- Daniele Battaglia (1)
- Benji & Fede (1)
- Orietta Berti (1)
- Beyoncé (1)
- Justin Bieber (3)
- Bizarrap (2)
- Black Eyed Peas (3)
- Blackwood (1)
- Blanco (7)
- Mary J. Blige (1)
- Bloodhoundgang (1)
- Bloody Vinyl (1)
- Blue (1)
- Bomfunk MC's (1)
- Boomdabash (1)
- Jon Bon Jovi (1)
- Bon Jovi (1)
- Bono (1)
- Boro (1)
- Tony Boy (1)
- Carl Brave (1)
- Michele Bravi (1)
- Brenda (1)
- Bresh (2)
- Alex Britti (1)
- Bronski Beat (1)
- Michael Bublé (1)
- Descemer Bueno (1)
- Burna Boy (1)
- Luca Butera (1)

== C ==
- The Calling (1)
- Camila Cabello (1)
- Pedro Capó (1)
- Cara (1)
- Mariah Carey (1)
- Pierdavide Carone (1)
- Marco Carta (2)
- Manu Chao (1)
- Charlie Charles (2)
- Chiara (2)
- Cher (1)
- Cinema 2 (1)
- Clean Bandit (1)
- Club Dogo (3)
- Coez (3)
- Colapesce (1)
- Coldplay (1)
- Coolio (1)
- Cesare Cremonini (1)

== D ==
- Daft Punk (2)
- Dardust (1)
- Dark Polo Gang (3)
- Deborah Iurato (1)
- Miggy Dela Rosa (1)
- Depeche Mode (6)
- Des'ree (1)
- Dido (2)
- Djo (1)
- Dimartino (1)
- Luca Dirisio (1)
- Diodato (1)
- Celine Dion (1)
- DJ Snake (1)
- Drake (1)
- Dr. Dre (1)
- DrefGold (2)
- Drillionaire (1)

== E ==
- Eamon (1)
- Sfera Ebbasta (33)
- Tony Effe (2)
- Eiffel 65 (2)
- El Alfa (1)
- El Cata (1)
- Elisa (4)
- Elio e le Storie Tese (1)
- Elodie (1)
- Eminem (3)
- Ernia (1)
- Evanescence (1)
- Faith Evans (1)

== F ==
- La Fuertezza (1)
- Farruko (1)
- Dani Faiv (1)
- Fedez (13)
- Roberto Ferrante (1)
- Giusy Ferreri (5)
- Tiziano Ferro (5)
- Fabri Fibra (2)
- Five (1)
- Luis Fonsi (1)
- Zucchero Fornaciari (1)
- Lorenzo Fragola (1)
- Freshlyground (1)
- Fugees (1)

== G ==
- Francesco Gabbani (1)
- Maria Gadú (1)
- Lady Gaga (1)
- Gaia (1)
- Gala (1)
- Gente De Zona (1)
- Gemitaiz (2)
- Geolier (11)
- Ghali (5)
- Maître Gims (1)
- Giò Di Tonno (1)
- Giorgia (2)
- Giuliano Sangiorgi (1)
- Selena Gomez (1)
- Goo Goo Dolls (1)
- Gotye (1)
- Ellie Goulding (2)
- Gorillaz (1)
- Green Day (1)
- David Guetta (1)

== H ==
- Haiducii (1)
- Geri Halliwell (1)
- Hoobastank (1)
- Hozier (1)
- Rocco Hunt (1)
- James Hype (1)

== I ==
- Enrique Iglesias (2)
- Irama (1)

== J ==
- Janet Jackson (1)
- J-Ax (5)
- Michael Jackson (7)
- Nicky Jam (2)
- Jamelia (1)
- Jamiroquai (2)
- Samurai Jay (1)
- Simone Jay (1)
- Wyclef Jean (2)
- Jon Bon Jovi (1)
- Livin' Joy (1)
- Vegas Jones (1)
- Jovanotti (6)
- Juanes (1)
- Juli (2)

== K ==
- Junior K (1)
- Ronan Keating (1)
- Nicole Kidman (1)
- Kiesza (1)
- Kimbra (1)
- Sean Kingston (1)
- Wiz Khalifa (2)
- Emis Killa (4)
- Klingande (1)
- The Kolors (1)
- Lenny Kravitz (1)

== L ==
- Simba La Rue (1)
- Las Ketchup (1)
- Achille Lauro (2)
- Avril Lavigne (1)
- Lazza (12)
- Le Vibrazioni (1)
- Levante (1)
- Ligabue (4)
- Lighthouse Family (1)
- Lilly Wood & The Prick (1)
- Gusttavo Lima (1)
- Lollipop (1)
- Jennifer Lopez (4)
- Lorde (1)
- Lo Stato Sociale (1)
- Lukas Graham (1)
- Lucenzo (1)
- Luchè (1)
- Lumidee (1)
- Lunapop (1)
- Lykke Li (1)
- L.V. (1)

== M ==
- MØ (1)
- Mace (1)
- Machette (2)
- Madonna (12)
- Madman (2)
- Mahmood (4)
- Major Lazer (1)
- Måneskin (2)
- Angelina Mango (1)
- Fiorella Mannoia (1)
- Manu Chao (1)
- Marracash (4)
- Lene Marlin (3)
- Marracash (2)
- Emma Marrone (5)
- Ricky Martin (3)
- Maroon 5 (1)
- Marco Masini (1)
- Mattafix (1)
- Ana Mena (2)
- Shawn Mendes (1)
- Paolo Meneguzzi (1)
- Marco Mengoni (5)
- George Michael (3)
- Michelangelo (1)
- Francesca Michielin (4)
- Mika (2)
- Robert Miles (3)
- Mina (1)
- Kylie Minogue (2)
- Modà (1)
- Fabrizio Moro (1)

== N ==
- Gianna Nannini (1)
- Nathalie (1)
- Naughty Boy (1)
- Maria Nayler (1)
- Negramaro (1)
- Neja (1)
- Nek (1)
- Anne-Marie (1)
- Noemi (2)
- Noir Desir (1)
- Novecento (1)
- Nstasia (1)

== O ==
- Oasis (5)
- The Offspring (1)
- Mr. Oizo (1)
- Olly (3)
- Omega (1)
- Omi (1)
- OneRepublic (1)
- Don Omar (1)

== P ==
- Fred De Palma (2)
- Panjabi MC (1)
- Sean Paul (2)
- Passenger (1)
- Laura Pausini (5)
- Paola & Chiara (1)
- Massimo Pericolo (1)
- Guè Pequeno (7)
- Katy Perry (1)
- Pulcino Pio (1)
- Pinguini Tattici Nucleari (4)
- Pink (1)
- Pitbull (1)
- Piero Pelù (2)
- Capo Plaza (7)
- Elvis Presley (1)
- Psy (1)
- Lola Ponce (1)
- Povia (1)
- Charlie Puth (2)
- Puff Daddy (1)
- Pyrex (1)

== Q ==
- Quavo (1)
- Quevedo (1)

== R ==
- Raf (1)
- Eros Ramazzotti (6)
- Dizzee Rascal (1)
- Red Hot Chili Peppers (1)
- Regina (1)
- Francesco Renga (2)
- Rhove (1)
- Rihanna (2)
- Rkomi (2)
- Valeria Rossi (1)
- Vasco Rossi (9)
- Fabio Rovazzi (2)
- Kelly Rowland (1)
- Lee Ryan (1)
- Nate Ruess (1)
- Rvssian (1)

== S ==
- Vito Salamanca (1)
- Salmo (9)
- Sam Smith (1)
- Sangiovanni (1)
- Mara Sattei (3)
- Savage Garden (1)
- Valerio Scanu (2)
- Robin Schulz (1)
- Shablo (1)
- Shakira (7)
- Ed Sheeran (3)
- Shiva (11)
- Sick Luke (1)
- Shivaree (1)
- Shune (1)
- Sia (1)
- Slait (1)
- Snow (1)
- Álvaro Soler (2)
- Stash (1)
- Britney Spears (4)
- Spice Girls (2)
- Stromae (1)
- Sugarfree (1)

== T ==
- T-Pain (1)
- t.A.T.u. (1)
- Takagi & Ketra (3)
- Take That (1)
- Tananai (1)
- Tedua (2)
- Michel Teló (1)
- Thasup (8)
- Thegiornalisti (1)
- Justin Timberlake (1)
- Timbaland (2)
- Tina Turner (1)
- Ti.Pi.Cal. (2)
- Tiromancino (1)
- Tones and I (1)
- Tony Boy (1)
- Tricarico (1)

== U ==
- U2 (9)
- Ultimo (2)
- Underworld (1)
- Urban Strangers (1)
- Midge Ure (1)

== V ==
- The Verve (1)
- Rose Villain (2)

== W ==
- Alan Walker (1)
- Wham! (1)
- White Town (1)
- Will.I.Am (1)
- Willy William (1)
- Pharrell Williams (2)
- Robbie Williams (5)

== X ==
- X Factor Finalisti 2009 (1)

== Y ==
- Daddy Yankee (2)
- Kid Yugi (3)

== Z ==
- Checco Zalone (1)
- Zero Assoluto (2)
- Renato Zero (3)
