= Icon (Tony Effe album) =

Studio album by Tony Effe
- Released: 15 March 2024
- Genres: Hip hop; trap
- Length: 45:02
- Label: Island
- Producers: Armonica; Ava; Charlie Charles; Daves; Drillionaire; Kiid; LAX; Marramvsic; Nightfeelings; Sadturs; Sick Luke; Takagi & Ketra; T9C; Youngotti; Zef

Tony Effe chronology
Untouchable (2021)	Icon (2024)	Crack musica II (2026)

Singles from Icon
- 1. "Boss" Released: 24 March 2023; 2. "Taxi sulla Luna" Released: 9 June 2023; 3. "Particolari sporchi" Released: 15 March 2024; 4. "Sesso e samba" Released: 22 May 2024; 5. "Chiara" Released: 19 September 2024; 6. "Damme 'na mano" Released: 12 February 2025

Icon is the second studio album by Italian rapper Tony Effe. It was released by Island Records on 15 March 2024.

The album includes featured guest appearances by Italian rappers Sfera Ebbasta, Geolier, Simba La Rue, Lazza, Capo Plaza, Ghali, Guè, Pyrex and Side Baby, and Italian singers Tedua, Bresh, Rose Villain, Emma and Gaia.

It peaked at number one on the Italian Albums Chart and was certified six-times platinum, becoming the best-selling album of 2024 in Italy.

== Track listing ==
Icon – Standard track listing
No.	Title	Lyrics	Music	Producer(s)	Length
1.	"Vero Tony vero Sosa"	Nicolò Rapisarda	Diego Vincenzo Vettraino; Thomas Crimeni	Drillionaire	2:44
2.	"Pillole" (featuring Sfera Ebbasta and Geolier)	Rapisarda; Gionata Boschetti; Emanuele Palumbo	Vettraino	Drillionaire	2:27
3.	"Carrara" (featuring Simba La Rue)	Rapisarda; Mohamed Lamine Saida	Vettraino; Federico Franco	Drillionaire; LAX	3:09
4.	"Particolari sporchi"	Rapisarda; Alessandro Merli; Emanuele Busnaghi; Luca Aleotti	Vettraino; Alessio Bungiorno; Massimo Montonato; Paolo Alberto Monachetti	Charlie Charles	2:47
5.	"Honey" (featuring Lazza and Capo Plaza)	Rapisarda; Jacopo Lazzarini; Luca D'Orso	Vettraino	Drillionaire	2:44
6.	"Miu miu"	Rapisarda; Valeria Palmitessa	Palmitessa; Andrea Arcangeli; Salvatore Angelucci; Vettraino	Drillionaire; Armonica	2:27
7.	"GTA" (featuring Ghali)	Rapisarda; Ghali Amdouni	Alessandro Moretti; Francesco Turolla; Lorenzo Bassotti; Luca Antonio Barker	Sadturs; Kiid; Nightfeelings; Youngotti; Sick Luke	2:08
8.	"Dopo le 4" (featuring Bresh and Tedua)	Rapisarda; Andrea Brasi; Mario Molinari	Vettraino; Luca Di Blasi	Drillionaire	3:02
9.	"Icon"	Rapisarda	Vettraino; Franco; Federico Roncoletta	Drillionaire; LAX	2:08
10.	"Maison"	Rapisarda	Artem Raschepkin; Turolla; Bassotti	Sadturs; Kiid	3:01
11.	"Lap Dance" (featuring Pyrex and Side Baby)	Rapisarda; Dylan Thomas Cerulli; Arturo Bruni	Francesco Avallone; Barker; Marco Marra	AVA; Sick Luke; Marramvsic	2:43
12.	"Demon Time" (featuring Guè)	Rapisarda; Cosimo Fini	Vettraino; Davide Covino	Drillionaire; Daves	3:01
13.	"Balenciaga" (featuring Rose Villain)	Rapisarda; Rosa Luini	Vettraino; Carlo Pizzocaro; Francesco Ravesi	Drillionaire	2:42
14.	"P"	Rapisarda	Vettraino	Drillionaire	2:41
15.	"Sorry"	Rapisarda	Vettraino; Franco; Crimeni	Drillionaire; LAX; T9C	2:22
16.	"Boss"	Rapisarda	Vettraino; Andre R. Young; Curtis James Jackson III; Mike Elizondo	Drillionaire	2:24
17.	"Taxi sulla Luna" (with Emma)	Rapisarda; Paolo Antonacci	Merli; Fabio Clemente	Takagi & Ketra	2:23
Total length:					45:02

Icon – Digital re-issue bonus tracks
No.	Title	Lyrics	Music	Producer(s)	Length
1.	"Damme 'na mano"	Rapisarda; Davide Petrella	Petrella; Vettraino; Luca Faraone	Drillionaire	2:58
2.	"Pezzi da 100" (featuring Kid Yugi)	Rapisarda; Francesco Stasi; Alex Vella	Vella; Barker	Sick Luke	2:39
3.	"Chiara"	Rapisarda	Vettraino	Drillionaire; Daves	2:29
4.	"Sesso e samba" (with Gaia)	Gaia Gozzi; Rapisarda; Petrella	Stefano Tognini	Zef	2:48

== Charts ==
=== Weekly charts ===
Weekly chart performance for Icon
Chart (2024)	Peak position
Italian Albums (FIMI)	1
Swiss Albums (Schweizer Hitparade)	9

=== Year-end charts ===
Year-end chart performance for Icon
Chart (2024)	Position
Italian Albums (FIMI)	1

== Certifications ==
Certifications for Icon
Region	Certification	Certified units/sales
Italy (FIMI)	6× Platinum	300,000^{‡}
^{‡} Sales+streaming figures based on certification alone.
