= Ernia =

Italian rapper (born 1993)

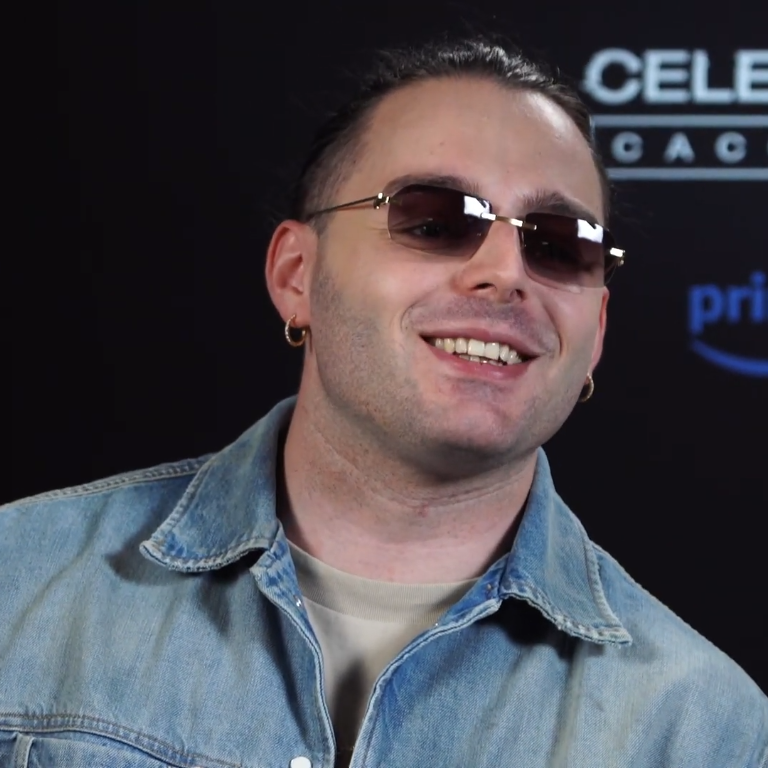
- Ernia in 2024

Background information
- Born: Matteo Professione; 29 November 1993 (age 32); Milan, Italy
- Genres: Hip hop; pop rap; conscious hip hop
- Occupation: Rapper
- Years active: 2011–present

Matteo Professione (born 29 November 1993), known professionally as Ernia, is an Italian rapper. He founded the crew Troupe D'Elite with fellow hip hop artist Ghali, also including Maite and producer Fawzi.

== Early life ==
Born in Milan, Ernia is the great-grandson of immigrants: one of his paternal great-grandfather was a Swiss German, while one of his maternal great-grandfathers was an exodate from Rovinj, while being originally from Montenegro.

Raised in the QT8 neighborhood of Milan (a neighborhood that Ernia himself mentions several times in his songs), he was introduced to the world of hip hop mainly through his childhood friend Tedua, with whom he grew up during his pre-teen years. Ernia then joined the Bonola Family and Razza a Parte, collectives based in the neighboring Bonola neighborhood.

After his musical stint with Troupe D'Elite, which came to an end in 2014, Ernia—who was enrolled in the university’s Department of Modern Languages at the time— dropped out of school, and after a brief job as a waiter, he moved to London, where he lived for five months. This was followed by his first return to Milan, where he worked at the European Institute of Oncology. He then stayed in France, and finally returned permanently to Italy.

Alongside the resumption of his musical career in 2016, Ernia re-enrolled in college, once again in the Department of Languages.

== Career ==
=== 2011-2014: Beginnings ===
When we first released our trap tracks—which were very fleeting and lighthearted—we got absolutely slammed. Everyone was still too busy trying to come across as something they weren’t; a lot of them started acting all high and mighty. About four years later, they all started making trap.

— Ernia

In 2011, alongside Ghali (then known as Ghali Foh), singer Maite Zoe Dall'Asen (Maite), and producer Fawzi (Fonzi Beat), he joined the group Troupe D'Elite under the stage name ErNyah. The group was soon signed by Gué Pequeno to Tanta Roba, a label founded that same year by Fini jointly with DJ Harsh.

In 2012, Troupe D'Elite released the self-titled EP (featuring Don Joe), but it was met with negative reviews. The following year, the group participated in the auditions for the talent show Amici di Maria De Filippi, without achieving success. Meanwhile, in collaboration with Ghali, Maite, Sfera Ebbasta, and other emerging artists, Ernia released the solo mixtape N.G.R.B., produced by Charlie Charles.

Following an argument with DJ Harsh in 2014, Troupe D'Elite terminated their contract with Tanta Roba and released the album Il mio giorno preferito as independent artists, available as a free download on the Honiro platform; a few months later, however, the group disbanded. This was an EP and it was released through Honiro Records.

=== 2016-2017: Come uccidere un usignolo ===
He resumed his solo rap career in 2016 and after releasing several singles under the Thaurus label, including Fenomeno, featuring Izi and Moses Sangare, he released the EP No Hooks, consisting of four tracks and characterized by the complete absence of choruses (as the title suggests).

On 2 June 2017, Ernia's first studio album How to Kill a Nightingale was released, consisting of eight tracks. The title refers to the novel To Kill a Mockingbird, in which a Black farmhand is wrongfully convicted; this is a comparison to the unwarranted insults and hatred directed at Troupe D’Elite. The album has been certified platinum by the Italian Music Industry Federation, alongside the track “Bella”, while the track “Madonna”, featuring Rkomi, was certified gold. Among the other tracks on this album by Ernia, special attention was also given to “Amici” which deals with Ernia's troubled childhood alongside Tedua; in an interview with Rolling Stone Italia, Ernia stated: “I tried to craft a narrative in the vein of Stephen King’s The Body: a story of kids grappling with something much bigger than themselves, yet experiencing it with a touch of naivety due to their age.”

On 3 November 2017, the rapper released Come uccidere un usignolo/67, a reissue of his debut album featuring a second disc, conceived by the artist as the “second chapter of the saga” and titled 67 (an allusion to the title of 68, the album that Ernia would release next year). The double album, consisting of sixteen tracks, features collaborations with Gué Pequeno and Mecna, on the songs “Disgusting” and “Tradimento (il traditore)”, respectively. Ranking among the top spots on the FIMI Album Chart, this ranking confirmed its positive reception from critics, while “Disgusting” itself became a certified gold track.

=== 2018-2021: 68 and Gemelli ===
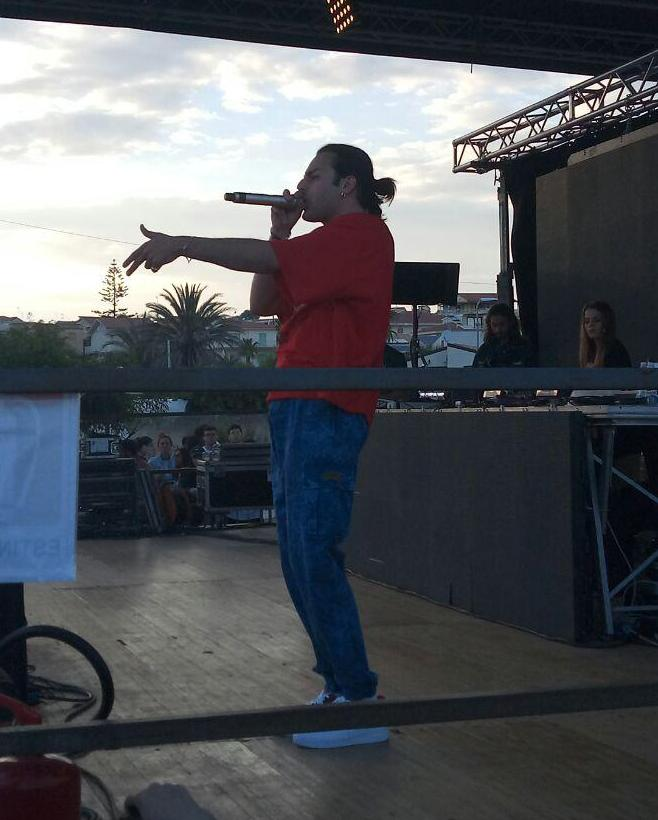
Ernia in a 2019 concert

On 9 February 2019, Ernia released the song “La pelle del puma,” a commercial tribute to the partnership between AC Milan and Puma. Preceded by the music videos for the tracks “Domani” and “Simba,” Ernia released his second studio album “68” on September 7, 2018 through Island Records. The album consists of twelve tracks, produced by Marz and Shablo, including the single 68. The album’s name is based on the bus of the same name that runs through Bonola, on the outskirts of the QT8 district. The album cover is a reference to the cover photo of the January 1950 issue of the American magazine Vogue, taken by Erwin Blumenfeld. On 7 March 2019, during the final show of the “68 Tour” in Milan, Ernia announced the release of a reissue of the album, titled 68 (Till the End). It was set for release on April 5 and this new edition included a second CD featuring seven tracks, including the lead single “Certi giorni”, produced in collaboration with Nitro.

On 19 June 2020, the third studio album Gemelli was released. The title is meant to represent “two very similar sides that can have very different characteristics.” The album is also accompanied by the single "Superclassico", released on the same day. The album reached the top of the FIMI Album Chart, and was certified five-times platinum; the only single, "Superclassico", reached the top of the Top Singles chart, and he earned seven platinum certifications.

On 20 May 2021, a reissue of the album was released, titled Gemelli (ascendente Milano), featuring six previously unreleased tracks, including the single "Di notte" featuring Sfera Ebbasta and Carl Brave.

=== 2022-2024: Io non ho paura ===
On 26 October 2022, Ernia announced his musical comeback through his social media channels, announcing his fourth studio album Io non ho paura. The album was released on 18 November 2022. After debuting at the top of the FIMI Album chart, was certified triple platinum. Leading up to its release, promotional posters were displayed in various Italian cities bearing the phrase “Are you afraid of the new? You should be.” On November 10, a documentary based on the album was released via Esse magazine, in which Ernia and various producers discussed the album’s creation and concept; various guest artists, including Rkomi, Gaia, Marco Mengoni, and Salmo, were also in the documentary. The first single, "Bella fregatura", was released simultaneously with the album.

On 26 May 2023, Ernia released the single "Parafulmini" in collaboration with Bresh and Fabri Fibra and contributed to the album I nomi del diavolo by Kid Yugi, released on 1 March 2024, with the track "Nemico".

=== 2025-present: Per soldi e per amore ===
On 19 September 2025, Ernia released his fifth studio album, Per soldi e per amore, from which the single "Per te" was a part of. The album consists of twelve tracks, including four collaborations with Club Dogo, Kid Yugi, Madame, Marracash, Charlie Charles, Dat Boi Dee, Don Joe, Marz, and Zef. The album, after debuting at the top of the FIMI Album chart, was certified platinum.

== Personal life ==
Since 2019, Ernia has been in a relationship with model and influencer Valentina Cabassi. On 8 February 2025, he announced that they are expecting a daughter. Their daughter, Sveva, was born on 7 July 2025.

He has a sister who moved to Berlin in 2021; he dedicated the song “Berlino,” featured on the album Per soldi e per amore, to her.

== Discography ==
=== Studio albums ===
| Title | Details | Peak chart positions | | Certifications |
| Title | Details | ITA | SWI | Certifications |
|---|---|---|---|---|
| Come uccidere un usignolo (Note: The album Come uccidere un usignolo was re-released on 3 November 2017 as Come uccidere un usignolo / 67.) | Released: 2 June 2017; Label: Thaurus; Format: 2× CD, digital download, streaming | 5 | — | FIMI: Platinum |
| 68 (Note: The album 68 was re-released as 68 (Till the End) on 5 April 2019.) | Released: 7 September 2018; Label: Island; Format: CD, LP, digital download, streaming | 1 | — | FIMI: 2× Platinum |
| Gemelli | Released: 19 June 2020; Label: Island; Format: CD, LP, digital download, streaming | 1 | 61 | FIMI: 6× Platinum |
| Io non ho paura | Released: 18 November 2022; Label: Island; Format: CD, LP, digital download, streaming | 1 | 32 | FIMI: 3× Platinum |
| Per soldi e per amore | Released: 19 September 2025; Label: Island; Format: CD, LP, digital download, streaming | 1 | 23 | FIMI: 2× Platinum |

=== Extended plays ===
| Title | Details |
|---|---|
| No Hooks | Released: 21 September 2016; Label: Thaurus; Format: digital download |

=== Singles ===
==== As lead artist ====
| Title | Year | Peak chart positions | Certifications | Album |
| Title | Year | ITA | Certifications | Album |
|---|---|---|---|---|
| "Tutto bene" | 2016 | — | | Non-album singles |
| "Venere" | 2016 | — | | Non-album singles |
| "Fenomeno" (featuring Izi and Moses Sangare) | 2016 | — | | Non-album singles |
| "Ego" | 2017 | — | | Come uccidere un usignolo |
| "La pelle del puma" | 2018 | — | | Non-album single |
| "68" | 2018 | 54 | FIMI: Gold | 68 |
| "Certi giorni" (featuring Nitro) | 2019 | 42 | FIMI: Platinum | 68 |
| "Superclassico" | 2020 | 1 | FIMI: 7× Platinum | Gemelli |
| "Nuove strade" (with Rkomi, Samurai Jay, Madame, Gaia and Andry the Hitmaker) | 2020 | 51 | | Non-album single |
| "Ferma a guardare" (featuring Pinguini Tattici Nucleari) | 2021 | 3 | FIMI: 5× Platinum | Gemelli |
| "Di notte" (featuring Sfera Ebbasta and Carl Brave) | 2021 | 17 | FIMI: Platinum | Gemelli |
| "Bella fregatura" | 2022 | 5 | FIMI: 2× Platinum | Io non ho paura |
| "Il mio nome – Remix" (featuring Mara Sattei) | 2023 | 51 | FIMI: Platinum | Io non ho paura |
| "Lewandowski X" | 2023 | 43 | | Io non ho paura |
| "Parafulmini" (with Bresh and Fabri Fibra) | 2023 | 13 | FIMI: 3× Platinum | Io non ho paura |
| "My Love!" (with Sixpm, Rose Villain and SLF) | 2024 | 87 | | Non-album single |
| "Per te" | 2025 | 2 | FIMI: Platinum | Per soldi e per amore |
| "Berlino" | 2025 | 19 | FIMI: Platinum | Per soldi e per amore |

==== As featured artist ====
| Title | Year | Peak chart positions | Certifications | Album |
| Title | Year | ITA | Certifications | Album |
|---|---|---|---|---|
| "Acqua calda e limone" (Rkomi featuring Ernia) | 2018 | 45 | FIMI: Platinum | Ossigeno – EP |
| "Numb" (Merk & Kremont featuring Svea and Ernia) | 2020 | — | | Non-album single |
| "25 ore" (Guè featuring Ernia and Shablo) | 2020 | 64 | FIMI: Gold | Mr. Fini |
| "Kandinsky" (Don Joe featuring Ernia and Rose Villain) | 2021 | — | | Milano soprano |
| "Ricordi" (Epoque featuring Ernia) | 2023 | — | | Tram 83 |
| "Giorgia" (Suspect CB featuring Ernia) | 2024 | — | | Eco |
| "Il doc 4" (VillaBanks featuring Ernia, Emis Killa and Niky Savage) | 2024 | 43 | | Quanto manca 2 |
| "Istinto animale" (Don Joe featuring Guè, Annalisa and Ernia) | 2024 | 29 | | Non-album single |
| "Io vorrei 2024" (Gigi D'Alessio featuring Elodie and Ernia) | 2024 | 78 | | Fra |
| "Good Girl" (The Night Skinny featuring Rkomi, Ernia and Bresh) | 2024 | 18 | | Containers |

=== Guest appearances ===
| Title | Year | Other artist(s) | Album |
|---|---|---|---|
| "I fantastici 4" | 2011 | GionnyScandal, Blema, Ghali | Haters Make Me Famous |
| "Follow Me" | 2012 | Guè, Ghali | Fastlife Mixtape Vol. 3 |
| "We lo zio" | 2013 | Ghali | Leader |
| "Non ci siamo" | 2013 | Sfera Ebbasta | Emergenza Mixtape Vol. 1 |
| "Bulletproof" | 2017 | Highsnob | PrettyBoy |
| "Male" | 2017 | The Night Skinny | Pezzi |
| "Garage" | 2018 | Crookers | Crookers Mixtape 2 |
| "Se mi perdo altrove" | 2019 | CoCo, Mecna | Acquario |
| "Numero 10" | 2019 | The Night Skinny, Quentin40 | Mattoni |
| "Novità" | 2019 | The Night Skinny, Rkomi, Tedua | Mattoni |
| "Mattoni" | 2019 | The Night Skinny, Noyz Narcos, Shiva, Guè, Speranza, Achille Lauro, Geolier, Lazza, Side Baby, Taxi B | Mattoni |
| "Lascia un segno" | 2019 | Fabri Fibra, Rkomi | Il tempo vola 2002–2020 |
| "Diamanti" | 2020 | Elodie | This Is Elodie |
| "Iqos" | 2020 | Giaime | Mula |
| "Bro II" | 2020 | Tedua | Vita vera Mixtape: Aspettando la Divina Commedia |
| "Soli al mondo" | 2020 | Random | Montagne russe |
| "Wow" | 2021 | Mecna | Mentre nessuno guarda |
| "Sirena" | 2021 | MACE, Samurai Jay, DARRN | OBE |
| "Per tutta la città" | 2021 | Emis Killa, Jake La Furia | 17 (Dark Edition) |
| "Nuda" | 2021 | Madame | Madame |
| "Polka 2" | 2021 | Rosa Chemical, Guè | Forever and Ever |
| "10 ragazze" | 2021 | Rkomi | Taxi Driver |
| "Via da qui" | 2021 | TY1, Tiromancino | Djungle |
| "Le mie note" | 2021 | Leon Faun | C'era una volta |
| "Sul 'a mia" | 2021 | Lele Blade | Ambizione |
| "Futura ex" | 2021 | Guè | Guesus |
| "Creatur" | 2022 | Sick Luke, Geolier | X2 |
| "Ci riuscirò davvero" | 2022 | Luchè | Dove volano le aquile |
| "Apri" | 2022 | Salmo, Lucienn, Verano | Blocco 181 (Original Soundtrack) |
| "Marciapiede" | 2022 | The Night Skinny, Tony Effe, Rkomi | Botox |
| "Prodotto" | 2022 | The Night Skinny, Paky, Jake La Furia, Lazza | Botox |
| "Addio" | 2022 | The Night Skinny, Rkomi, Mahmood, Gazzelle | Botox |
| "Sparami" | 2022 | The Night Skinny, Ariete, CoCo | Botox |
| "Triste" | 2023 | Sacky, Neima Ezza | Quello vero |
| "In Heaven" | 2023 | Nitro | Outsider |
| "Fiumi rosé" | 2023 | Don Joe, Neima Ezza | Don dada |
| "Odio stare da solo" | 2023 | Pyrex | Love Is War |
| "McDrive (La Haine)" | 2023 | Emis Killa | Effetto notte |
| "Fiori d'orgoglio" | 2023 | Marco Mengoni | Materia (Prisma) |
| "Figlio unico" | 2023 | Irama, Rkomi, Kid Yugi | No Stress |
| "Diavoli" | 2023 | Nerissima Serpe | Identità |
| "Nemico" | 2024 | Kid Yugi | I nomi del diavolo |
| "Stan" | 2024 | Rose Villain | Radio Sakura |
| "Lumière" | 2024 | MACE, Izi, Astro, Tony Boy | Māyā |
| "Non mi vedi" | 2024 | Baby Gang, Fabri Fibra, Geolier, Rkomi | L'angelo del male |
| "Se fosse per me" | 2024 | CoCo | Mai più forse |
| "Take Me to the Beach (Remix)" | 2024 | Imagine Dragons | Loom |
| "Se corri" | 2024 | Nayt | Lettera Q |
| "Nei DM" | 2025 | Guè, Tormento | Tropico del Capricorno |
| "Milano Bloody Money" | 2025 | Jake La Furia | Fame |
| "Vorrei" | 2025 | Rkomi | Decrescendo |
| "Veleno" | 2025 | Rkomi | Decrescendo |
| "Notte blu II" | 2025 | DJ Shocca, Frank Siciliano, Gemitaiz | 60 Hz II |
| "Welcome to the Jungle" | 2025 | Shablo, Joshua, Neffa | Manifesto |
| "Russian Roulette" | 2025 | Fabri Fibra | Mentre Los Angeles brucia |
| "La bella confusione" | 2025 | Charlie Charles, Madame | La bella confusione |
