= DrefGold =

Italian rapper (born 1997)

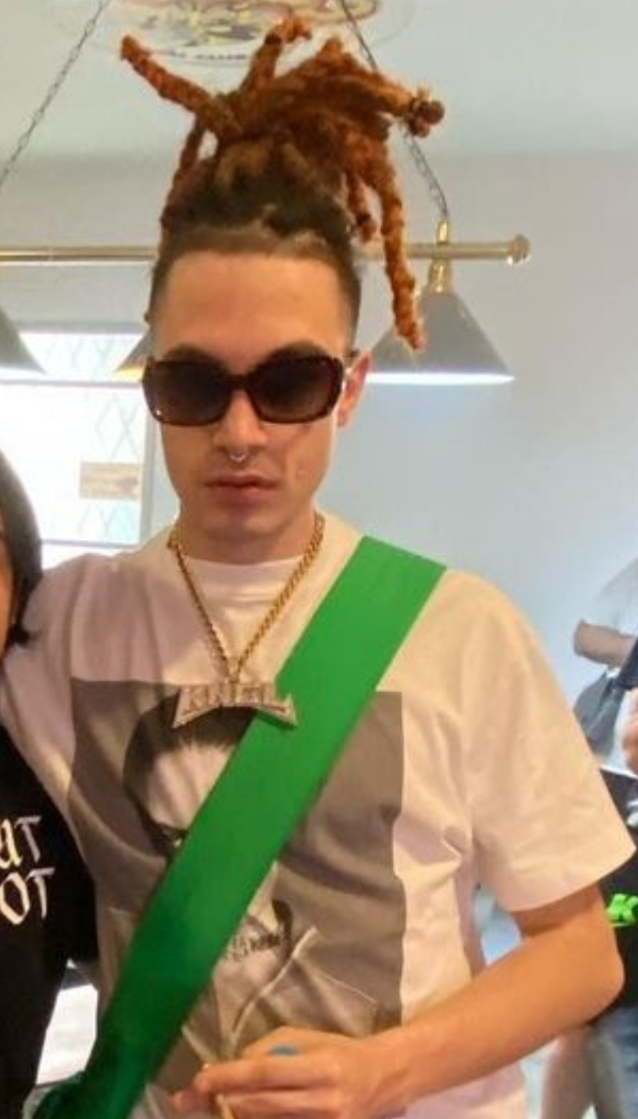
- DrefGold in 2022

Background information
- Born: Elia Specolizzi; 16 May 1997 (age 29); Racale, Apulia, Italy
- Genres: Trap, Rage rap
- Occupation: Rapper
- Years active: 2012–present
- Labels: Epic; Island; BHMG

Elia Specolizzi (born 16 May 1997), known professionally as DrefGold, is an Italian rapper.

== Biography ==
Born in Racale, a small village in the lower Salento, but moved to Bologna at a young age, DrefGold began to be passionate about American hip hop music at an early age, starting to write his first songs during his adolescence. In 2013 he joined BoomBap Haze collective, while two years later he opened concerts for rapper Jack the Smoker. In 2016 he released his first mixtape, Kanaglia.

In 2018 he collaborated with Capo Plaza and Sfera Ebbasta in the song "Tesla", contained in 20 by Capo Plaza, and with only Sfera Ebbasta in "Sciroppo", contained in Rockstar. After signing a record deal with Billion Headz Music Group, on 6 July 2018 he released his debut album Kanaglia, which debuted at second position in the Classifica FIMI Album; four singles were extracted from it, one of which was certified platinum ("Boss") and two gold ("Kanaglia" and "Occupato"). In the same year he collaborated with rapper Side Baby on the single "Nuvola".

On 23 August 2019 he was arrested in Bologna for illegal possession of 100 grams of hashish for the purpose of dealing, and for the possession of 12,000 euros in cash. During the year he continued his musical activity, releasing the title "Drip" and participating in the single "Glock" by Dark Polo Gang. The collaboration with the trio was renewed the following year with the song "Biberon", contained in the mixtape Dark Boys Club.

2020 also marked the release of DrefGold's second studio album, Elo, on 22 May. The single "Snitch e impicci", in collaboration with FSK Satellite, was extracted from it, and debuted in sixth place on the charts, It was followed by "223", and "Elegante", recorded together with Sfera Ebbasta. In 2024 he released his third album called Goblin, featuring artists such as Capo Plaza, Pyrex, Tony Boy, Tony Effe, Tedua and Bresh.

== Discography ==
=== Studio albums ===
Title	Album details	Peak chart positions	Certifications
Title	Album details	ITA	Certifications
Kanaglia	Released: 6 July 2018; Label: BHMG	2	FIMI: Gold
Elo	Released: 22 May 2020; Label: BHMG, Island	1	FIMI: Platinum
Goblin	Released: 8 November 2024; Label: Epic Records, Sony Music Italia	12	

=== EPs ===
Title	EPs details
The Spring Breaker	Released: 19 June 2026; Label: Epic Records, Sony Music Italia
The Summer SmAsher	Released: 4 September 2026; Label: Epic Records, Sony Music Italia

=== Mixtapes ===
Title	Mixtape details
Kanaglia	Released: 16 May 2016; Label: Pro Evolution Joint

=== Singles ===
Title	Year	Peak chart positions	Certifications	Album
Title	Year	ITA	Certifications	Album
"100mila"	2017	—		Non-album single
"Kanaglia"	2017	—	FIMI: Gold	Kanaglia
"Occupato" (with Daves the Kid)	2017	73	FIMI: Gold	Kanaglia
"Cuscino" (with Yamba)	2017	—		Non-album single
"Boss" (with Daves the Kid)	2018	5	FIMI: Platinum	Kanaglia
"Booster/Wave" (with Sfera Ebbasta)	2018	25		Kanaglia
"Nuvola" (with Side Baby)	2018	10		Kanaglia
"Drip"	2019	67		Non-album single
"Snitch e impicci" (with FSK Satellite)	2020	6	FIMI: Platinum	Elo
"223"	2020	92		Elo
"Elegante" (featuring Sfera Ebbasta)	2020	2	FIMI: 2x Platinum	Elo
"Anima"	2021	—		Elo Overtime
"Battiti"	2022	—		Non-album singles
"Giorni nel blocco"	2022	—		Non-album singles
"Mr. Komparema"	2022	—		Non-album singles
"Prova del 9" (with Tony Boy)	2023	—		Non-album singles
"Junkie Spiderman"	2024	—		Non-album singles
"Purple Rain" (featuring Tedua)	2024	—		Goblin
"Jannik Sipper"	2024	—		Goblin
"Bla o Cap" (featuring Low-Red)	2025	—		Non-album single
"—" denotes a single that did not chart or was not released.

=== As featured artist ===
Title	Year	Peak chart positions	Album
Title	Year	ITA	Album
"Glock" (Wayne Santana featuring DrefGold and Giaime)	2019	46	Non-album singles
"360" (Yamba featuring DrefGold and Sapobully)	2021	—	Non-album singles
"Fafa" (Coyote Jo Bastard featuring DrefGold)	2022	—	CNLPG
"Ferraglia" (Luchitos featuring DrefGold)	2022	—	Non-album singles
"Tritolo" (Vaz Tè featuring DrefGold)	2023	—	Non-album singles
"—" denotes a single that did not chart or was not released.

=== Other charted songs ===
Title	Year	Peak chart positions	Album
Title	Year	ITA	Album
"Booster" (with Daves the Kid)	2018	34	Kanaglia
"Fortuna" (with Daves the Kid)	2018	79	Kanaglia
"Soldi blu" (with Daves the Kid)	2018	99	Kanaglia
"Piccolo Dref" (with Daves the Kid)	2018	92	Kanaglia
"Elo"	2020	88	Elo
"Opps" (featuring Capo Plaza)	2020	15	Elo
"Domani l'altro"	2020	76	Elo
"Enjoy" (featuring Tedua)	2020	25	Elo
"Bankroll" (featuring Luchè)	2020	43	Elo
"Calma"	2020	77	Elo
"Zero+zero" (featuring Lazza)	2020	42	Elo
"Wickr Me" (featuring Tony Effe)	2020	49	Elo
"Giro d'Italia" (featuring Guè)	2020	48	Elo

=== Guest appearances ===
Title	Year	Other artist(s)	Peak chart positions	Certifications	Album
Title	Year	Other artist(s)	ITA	Certifications	Album
"Bob Marley"	2017	Magnum 357, Inda	—		Manuel De Marinis
"Sciroppo"	2018	Sfera Ebbasta	3	FIMI: 2x Platinum	Rockstar
"Tesla"	2018	Capo Plaza, Sfera Ebbasta	1	FIMI: 4x Platinum	20
"Borsello"	2018	Guè, Sfera Ebbasta	1	FIMI: Platinum	Sinatra
"777"	2019	Naar, Madd	—		Safar
"Nuovi euro"	2019	Enzo Dong	—		Dio perdona io no
"Biberon"	2020	Dark Polo Gang, Anna	8		Dark Boys Club
"Big Dog"	2020	Vaz Tè, Bresh	—		VT2M
"Tutto passa"	2020	Nex Casse	—		Vera pelle
"Non ne posso più"	2021	Lil Busso	—		Sbagli di proposito
"Rimowa"	2022	Wayne Santana	—		Succo di zenzero vol. 2
"Ice on Me"	2023	The Plug, Lil Keed	—		Plug Talk 2
"I Run Bo"	2023	Brenno Itani	—		Fino a prova contraria
"Ops l'ho detto"	2023	Lo Stato Sociale, Cimini	—		Stupido sexy futuro
"Horse Dance"	2023	Sadturs & KIID, Yung Snapp, Side Baby	—		No Regular Music
"Chrome Hearts"	2023	MV Killa	—		Fede II
"Big Bubble"	2025	Vale Lambo	—		Angeli violenti
"Non cambierò mai"	2025	Side Baby	—		Leggendario RXX Edition
"See U Later"	2026	Glocky	—		Freestyle
"—" denotes a single that did not chart or was not released.
