= Tony Effe =

Italian singer and rapper (born 1991)

- Born: Nicolò Rapisarda; 17 May 1991 (age 35); Rome, Lazio, Italy
- Genres: Hip hop; trap
- Occupation: Rapper
- Years active: 2014–present
- Label: Universal Music Group

Nicolò Rapisarda (born 17 May 1991), known professionally as Tony Effe, is an Italian rapper. He was a member of Dark Polo Gang.

== Early years ==
Nicolò Rapisarda started his career as a child actor at the age of 4. He starred in the film Viaggi di nozze in 1995, Paparazzi in 1998, L'ombra del gigante in 2000 and Prigionera del cuore in 2000. His TV debut was in a Rai show called Tutti per uno in which he played a young boy named Tony, forced to give up his dream of becoming a footballer due to illness.

== Music career ==
=== Dark Polo Gang ===
Tony Effe met the other members of Dark Polo Gang - Wayne Santana, Pyrex and Dark Side - when he was a child, and they started to make music together professionally after meeting producer Sick Luke. In 2015 they released the mixtape Full Metal Dark. The following year, Tony and Dark Side released the album Crack musica in collaboration with Sfera Ebbasta, Izi, and Traffik.

=== Solo ===
He debuted as a solo artist in 2021 with the studio album Untouchable, which featured collaborations from artists such as the American Gucci Mane, and the Italians Gué Pequeno, Tedua and Lazza, which topped the Italian album chart. In the following months, he released several singles, including "Balaclava" in collaboration with Capo Plaza, "Mi piace" with Sfera Ebbasta, and a remix of the track "Colpevole" with Geolier.

In 2024, he peaked at number 1 again with his second album Icon, which became the best-selling album of the year in Italy.

In February 2025, he competed in the Sanremo Music Festival 2025 with the song "Damme 'na mano", placing 25th. On the fourth night of the festival, dedicated to covers, he duetted with Noemi to perform the song "Tutto il resto è noia" by Franco Califano.

On 13 March 2026, he released a new mixtape CRACK MUSICA II. It debuted at the top of the album charts and the best-selling vinyl charts on the week of its release, in the week calculated from March 12 to March 19. It is a sequel to the first mixtape, CRACK MUSICA, released ten years prior in 2016 by Dark Polo Gang. The release of this sequel mixtape also led to the first CRACK MUSICA mixtape reaching rank twelve on the charts and third among vinyls.

== Discography ==
=== Studio albums ===
List of solo studio albums, with chart positions and certifications
Title	Details	Peak chart positions		Certifications
Title	Details	ITA	SWI	Certifications
Untouchable	Released: 4 June 2021; Label: 777 Ent, Universal Music Italia; Format: CD, LP, digital download	1	19	FIMI: 2× Platinum
Icon	Released: 15 March 2024; Label: Island Records, Universal Music Italia; Format: CD, LP, digital download	1	9	FIMI: 6× Platinum
Crack Musica II (with Side Baby)	Released: 13 March 2026; Label: Island Records; Format: CD, LP, digital download	1	—	

=== Singles ===
List of singles as lead artist, with peak chart positions, showing year released and album name
Title	Year	Peak chart positions		Certifications	Album
Title	Year	ITA	SWI	Certifications	Album
"Colpevole" (solo or featuring Geolier)	2021	28	—	FIMI: Platinum	Untouchable
"Effe"	2021	24	—	FIMI: Platinum	Untouchable
"Balaclava" (featuring Capo Plaza)	2021	30	—	FIMI: Gold	Untouchable
"Mi piace" (featuring Sfera Ebbasta)	2021	10	—	FIMI: Platinum	Untouchable
"Boss"	2023	3	97	FIMI: 2× Platinum	Icon
"Taxi sulla Luna" (with Emma and Takagi & Ketra)	2023	7	—	FIMI: 4× Platinum	Icon
"Particolari sporchi"	2024	26	—		Icon
"Miu miu"	2024	4	—	FIMI: 3× Platinum	Icon
"Sesso e samba" (with Gaia)	2024	1	56	FIMI: 4× Platinum	Icon
"64 barre di verità (Red Bull 64 Bars)" (with L.A.X. and F.T. Kings)	2024	54	—		Non-album single
"Chiara"	2024	14	—	FIMI: Gold	Icon
"Pezzi da 100" (featuring Kid Yugi)	2024	30	—		Icon
"Damme 'na mano"	2025	3	45	FIMI: Gold	Icon
"Espresso Macchiato" (remix) (with Tommy Cash)	2025	53	—		Non-album single
"—" denotes a single that did not chart or was not released.

=== As featured artist ===
List of singles as featured artist, showing year released and album name
Title	Year	Peak chart positions	Certifications	Album
Title	Year	ITA	Certifications	Album
"Marmellata" (Wayne Santana feat. Rosa Chemical, Tony Effe and Radical)	2021	—		Succo di zenzero vol. 2
"Il doc 2" (VillaBanks feat. Tony Effe and Guè)	2022	35	FIMI: Gold	Filtri
"#Si" (MamboLosco feat. Tony Effe)	2022	—		Non-album single
"Michelle Pfeiffer" (Rose Villain feat. Tony Effe)	2023	32	FIMI: Platinum	Radio Gotham
"Il doc 3" (VillaBanks feat. Tony Effe, Slings and MamboLosco)	2023	33	FIMI: Platinum	VillaBanks
"Hoe + Hard" (Icy Subzero feat. Tony Effe)	2023	42	FIMI: Gold	Non-album single
"Nati bastardi" (Capo Plaza feat. Tony Effe)	2024	25		Ferite (Deluxe Edition)
"Victoria's Secret" (Rose Villain feat. Tony Effe)	2025	24		Radio Vega
"Non basta mai" (Capo Plaza feat. Bresh and Tony Effe)	2025	7	FIMI: Gold	Non-album single
"—" denotes a single that did not chart or was not released.

=== Other charted or certified songs ===
List of other charted songs, showing year released and album name
Title	Year	Peak chart positions	Certifications	Album
Title	Year	ITA	Certifications	Album
"Scarafaggio" (Guè feat. Tony Effe and Il Profeta)	2017	11	FIMI: Platinum	Gentleman – Red Version
"Claro" (Guè feat. Tony Effe and Pyrex)	2018	2	FIMI: Gold	Sinatra
"Pass" (Tedua feat. Tony Effe)	2020	26		Vita vera mixtape: Aspettando la Divina Commedia
"Clean" (Lazza feat. Tony Effe)	2020	26		J
"Tony Montana" (feat. Gucci Mane)	2021	32		Untouchable
"Colpevole"	2021	28	FIMI: Platinum	Untouchable
"Escort Love" (feat. Guè)	2021	30	FIMI: Platinum	Untouchable
"È trap"	2021	36		Untouchable
"Ke lo ke" (feat. Lazza and Gazo)	2021	14	FIMI: Platinum	Untouchable
"Piazza"	2021	58		Untouchable
"Romolo e Remo" (feat. Pyrex)	2021	43		Untouchable
"Lacrime" (feat. Tedua)	2021	41		Untouchable
"Skyline" (feat. Wayne Santana)	2021	62		Untouchable
"Oh cazzo"	2021	50		Untouchable
"Luce a Roma" (feat. Side Baby)	2021	26		Untouchable
"Diverso"	2021	63		Untouchable
"Hentai" (Sick Luke feat. Ghali and Tony Effe)	2022	14		X2
"Cadillac" (SLF feat. MV Killa, Geolier and Tony Effe)	2022	92	FIMI: 2× Platinum	We the Squad vol. 2
"Fottiti" (Bresh feat. Tony Effe)	2022	73		Oro blu
"Mala" (Fred De Palma feat. Tony Effe, Lazza and Juli)	2022	79	FIMI: Platinum	PLC Tape 1
"Marciapiede" (The Night Skinny feat. Tony Effe, Ernia and Rkomi)	2022	27		Botox
"Coki" (The Night Skinny feat. Tony Effe, Noyz Narcos, Ketama126 and Guè)	2022	24		Botox
"BTX Posse" (The Night Skinny feat. Fabri Fibra, Ernia, Lazza, Tony Effe, Coez, Geolier, Guè, Paky and MamboLosco)	2022	16	FIMI: Gold	Botox
"Fashion" (Drillionaire feat. Anna, Lazza, Tony Effe and Benny Benassi)	2023	17	FIMI: Platinum	10
"3uphon" (Sfera Ebbasta feat. thasup and Tony Effe)	2023	9	FIMI: Platinum	X2VR
"Paura e delirio a Milano" (Ghali feat. Tony Effe, Side Baby and Pyrex)	2023	27		Pizza kebab Vol. 1
"Vero Tony vero Sosa"	2024	22		Icon
"Pillole" (feat. Sfera Ebbasta and Geolier)	2024	7	FIMI: Platinum	Icon
"Carrara" (feat. Simba La Rue)	2024	14	FIMI: Gold	Icon
"Honey" (feat. Lazza and Capo Plaza)	2024	10	FIMI: Platinum	Icon
"GTA" (feat. Ghali)	2024	28		Icon
"Dopo le 4" (feat. Bresh and Tedua)	2024	2	FIMI: 2× Platinum	Icon
"Icon"	2024	23	FIMI: Platinum	Icon
"Maison"	2024	48		Icon
"Lap Dance" (feat. Pyrex and Side Baby)	2024	30		Icon
"Demon Time" (feat. Guè)	2024	33		Icon
"Balenciaga" (feat. Rose Villain)	2024	34		Icon
"P"	2024	62		Icon
"Sorry"	2024	46	FIMI: Gold	Icon
"Mulan" (Anna feat. Tony Effe)	2024	56		Vera Baddie
"Convoglio" (Side Baby feat. Tony Effe)	2024	44		Leggendario
"Nella trap" (The Night Skinny feat. Artie 5ive, Capo Plaza and Tony Effe)	2024	6		Containers
"T.O.N.Y." (The Night Skinny feat. Tony Boy and Tony Effe)	2024	30		Containers
"Kalispera" (Guè feat. Ghali and Tony Effe)	2025	28		Tropico del Capricorno
"Money Machine" (Sick Luke feat. Tony Effe and Lazza)	2025	10		Dopamina
"Le donne" (Sick Luke feat. Tony Effe)	2025	55		Dopamina
"Calda" (Emis Killa feat. Tony Effe)	2025	82		Musica triste
"Business Boy" (Pyrex feat. Tony Effe)	2026	86		King of Dark
"Modalità dark" (with Side Baby)	2026	49		Crack musica II

== Filmography ==
=== Film ===
Year	Title	Role(s)	Notes
1995	Viaggi di nozze	Boy at Wedding	Uncredited
1998	Paparazzi	Little Boy	Cameo appearance
2000	L'ombra del gigante	Ottaviano	
2026	Agata Christian - Delitto sulle nevi	One Shot	

=== Television ===
Year	Title	Role(s)	Notes
1999	Tutti per uno	Tony Fornari	Two-parts television movie
2000	Prigioniere del cuore	Filippo	Television movie
2002	Ma il portiere non c'è mai?	Tommy	Recurring role
2018	Dark Polo Gang – La serie	Himself	Docuseries
