= Damme 'na mano =

Single by Tony Effe

from the album Icon (digital edition only)
- Language: Italian
- Released: 12 February 2025
- Genre: Trap; folk
- Label: Island
- Songwriters: Nicolò Rapisarda; Davide Petrella; Luca Faraone; Diego Vincenzo Vettraino
- Producer: Drillionaire

Tony Effe singles chronology
"Nati bastardi" (2024)	"Damme 'na mano" (2025)	"Espresso macchiato (remix)" (2025)

Music video
- "Damme 'na mano" on YouTube

"Damme 'na mano" (Romanesco for "Give Me a Hand") is a song by Italian rapper Tony Effe. It was released by Island on 12 February 2025. The song competed during the Sanremo Music Festival 2025, placing 25th in the final rank. It was later included in the digital re-issue of the rapper's second studio album, Icon.

== Music video ==
A music video of "Damme 'na mano", directed by Francesco Carnesecchi, was released on 12 February 2025 via the rapper's YouTube channel.

== Charts ==
=== Weekly charts ===
Chart performance for "Damme 'na mano"
Chart (2025)	Peak position
Italy (FIMI)	3
Italy Airplay (EarOne)	30
Switzerland (Schweizer Hitparade)	45

=== Year-end charts ===
Year-end chart performance for "Damme 'na mano"
Chart (2025)	Position
Italy (FIMI)	92

== Certifications ==
Certifications for "Damme 'na mano"
Region	Certification	Certified units/sales
Italy (FIMI)	Gold	100,000^{‡}
^{‡} Sales+streaming figures based on certification alone.
