= Sesso e samba =

Single by Tony Effe and Gaia

from the album Icon (digital edition only)
- Language: Italian
- Released: 23 May 2024
- Genre: Latin pop; samba; trap
- Length: 2:47
- Label: Universal
- Songwriters: Gaia Gozzi; Nicolò Rapisarda; Davide Petrella; Stefano Tognini
- Producer: Zef

Tony Effe singles chronology
"Particolari sporchi" (2021)	"Sesso e samba" (2024)	"64 barre di verità (Red Bull 64 Bars)" (2024)

Gaia singles chronology
"Dea saffica" (2024)	"Sesso e samba" (2024)	"Chiamo io chiami tu" (2025)

Music video
- "Sesso e samba" on YouTube

"Sesso e samba" ("Sex and Samba") is a song by Italian rapper Tony Effe and Italian singer Gaia. It was released on 23 May 2024 through Universal Music Italia, and included in the digital reissue of the rapper's second studio album, Icon.

The song peaked at number one on the Italian singles chart, becoming the first chart-topping song for both artists. It was certified platinum by FIMI after four weeks of sales.

== Composition ==
The song was written by the artists themself with Davide Petrella and Zef, who is also the producer. In an interview Vanity Fair Italia the singers explained the collaboration:

"We are glad to be there, that people can tie their memories to one of our pieces. The summer, especially for the guys, is a time of experience with precise soundtracks. [...] Everyone did their part, when Tony arrived the part I was going to sing was already ready, and he wrote the verses. I never had anything to say about that, as he did about mine: it was about being free, doing your own. In a system that can resemble, really, an assembly line, the trick is to do things without thinking too much, letting instinct speak, otherwise it becomes a mess. [...] We, even individually, have always been interested in doing the summer song without distorting ourselves. On our albums, we have less pop and catchy songs: music is not just this song. [...] We must not be victims of numbers. They hurt the music, because you look for the hit at all costs, and the musicians' heads. We come from ups and downs, we know how it works: today it's our turn and we enjoy the moment, tomorrow who knows".

== Critical reception ==
Alessandro Alicandri of TV Sorrisi e Canzoni described the song as musically different from the previous "Taxi sulla Luna" collaboration with Emma Marrone, finding it more akin to samba music, on which Effe sets "a lyric that mixes singing and speaking that seems to echo 1960s swing songs". Valeria Paglionico of Fanpage.it stated that the song is musically "fresh and magnetic" and that it "perfectly reflects the sensuality and complicity of the two artists".

In a less positive review Andrea Laffranchi of Corriere della Sera wrote that the song comes across musically with "sensuality, Brazilian mood even if it is not samba in purity" and a lyric "with minimal vocabulary," finding it "precisely constructed" but where nevertheless "spontaneity is lost." Laffranchi questioned "where the balance lies between the past consciousness on issues such as feminism and inclusion of Gaia and the masculinist language of the former dark Polo Gang."

== Music video ==
The music video for the song, directed by Attilio Cusani, was released the same day as the single through the rapper's YouTube channel.

== Commercial performance ==
"Sesso e samba" debuted at number ten on the Italian singles chart, becoming Tony Effe's fifth top-ten solo song and Gaia's third. The following week the song reached number one, becoming the first song to reach the top for both artists.

== Charts ==
=== Weekly charts ===
Weekly chart performance for "Sesso e samba"
Chart (2024–2025)	Peak position
Italy (FIMI)	1
Italy Airplay (EarOne)	1
Poland (Polish Airplay Top 100)	43
San Marino Airplay (SMRTV Top 50)	2
Serbia Airplay (Radiomonitor)	3
Switzerland (Schweizer Hitparade)	56

=== Year-end charts ===
2024 year-end chart performance for "Sesso e samba"
Chart (2024)	Position
Italy (FIMI)	6

Chart (2025)	Position
Italy (FIMI)	100

== Certifications ==
Region	Certification	Certified units/sales
Italy (FIMI)	4× Platinum	400,000^{‡}
^{‡} Sales+streaming figures based on certification alone.
