= Sentire la musica =

2026 song by Kid Yugi

Single by Kid Yugi

from the album Anche gli eroi muoiono: Post mortem
- Released: 30 October 2026
- Length: 3:26
- Label: EMI; Universal
- Producers: Bongi; Depha Beat; Ill Santo; Ksub; Mothz

Kid Yugi singles chronology
"64 barre di terrore" (2026)	"Sentire la musica" (2026)

"Sentire la musica" (transl. Feel the Music) is a song by Italian rapper Kid Yugi. It was released on 30 October 2026 as the second single from the reissue of his third studio album, Anche gli eroi muoiono.

It debuted at number one on the Italian Albums Chart.

== Charts ==
Weekly chart performance for "Sentire la musica"
Chart (2026)	Peak position
Italy (FIMI)	1
Italy Airplay (EarOne)	62
