= Paky =

Italian rapper (born 1999)

- Genres: Hip hop
- Occupation: Rapper
- Label: Universal Music Italia

Vincenzo Mattera (born 28 November 1999), known professionally as Paky, is an Italian rapper.

== Biography ==
Growing up between Secondigliano and Fuorigrotta, at the age of 10 Paky moved to Rozzano, a town in the province of Milan. He discovered rapping by chance as a child when he witnessed the filming of a Co'Sang music video, and became passionate about it when, during high school, he started listening to Italian and international hip hop.

The rapper made his debut in February 2019 with the single "Tutti i miei fra", under the pseudonym Pakartas, a term that means "hanged" in the Lithuanian language and which he would later shorten to Paky for the release of his first single, "Rozzi". The song gained notoriety to the point of being certified platinum by the Italian Music Industry Federation with 70,000 units sold nationwide, bringing the artist to the attention of Island Records. In November 2019, he made his first entry on the Top Singles chart with "Tuta Black", a collaboration with Shiva, which debuted at 53rd place.

Between 2020 and 2021, he became known in the Italian hip-hop scene through various collaborations with top artists, including the remix of "Sport - I muscoli" by Marracash, "Tik Tok RMX" by Sfera Ebbasta and "Ti levo le collane" by Gué Pequeno. His singles "Tuta Black", "Non scherzare", "Boss", "In piazza" and "Fendi Belt" released between these two years have all been certified gold discs.

January 2022 saw the release of "Blauer", the lead single for Paky's debut studio album, Salvatore. The album, released the following March, debuted at the top of the FIMI Album Chart and in less than three months went platinum with more than 50,000 certified sales. To promote the album, the rapper organized his first tour as a solo artist, the Salvatore Live Tour. October 2022 saw the release of Salvatore vive, a deluxe version of the rapper's debut album anticipated by the release of the tracks "Sharm El Sheikh" and the title track. The album also features the tracks Belen, Honor and Respect and La bellavita, the latter produced in collaboration with French artist Jul. On December 12, 2025, Paky released another album GLORIA. The album is described as being about an individual's race toward a sense of redemption that is never truly defined.

== Discography ==
=== Studio albums ===
- 2022 – Salvatore
- 2025 – GLORIA

=== Singles ===
As lead artist

- 2019 – "Rozzi"
- 2019 – "Tuta Black" (with Shiva)
- 2019 – "Non scherzare" (with Kermit)
- 2020 – "Boss" (with Kermit)
- 2020 – "In piazza" (with Shiva and Kermit)
- 2022 – "Blauer"
- 2022 – "Mama I'm a Criminal"
- 2022 – "Storie tristi" (with Night Skinny)
- 2022 – "Sharm El Sheikh"
- 2022 – "La bellavita" (feat. Jul)
- 2023 – "Tirana" (feat. Finem)
- 2023 – "Paky Freestyle 2"

Features

- 2021 – "Fendi Belt" (Shiva feat. Paky)
- 2022 – "L'amore e la violenza" (Jake La Furia feat. Paky & 8blevrai)
- 2022 – "Che stai dicenn" (Luchè feat. Paky)

=== Collaborations ===
- 2020 – "Alpha" (Hatik feat. Paky)
- 2020 – "Sport + muscoli (RMX)" (Marracash feat. Lazza, Luchè, Paky, Taxi B)
- 2020 – "Rari" (Tedua feat. Shiva, Paky)
- 2020 – "Ti levo le collane" (Gué Pequeno feat. Paky)
- 2021 – "Tik Tok RMX" (Sfera Ebbasta feat. Marracash, Gué Pequeno, Paky, Geolier)
- 2021 – "Djungle" (TY1 feat. Marracash, Taxi B and Paky)
- 2021 – "Non parlarmi" (Side Baby feat. Paky)
- 2021 – "Bandito" (Don Joe feat. Emis Killa, Paky)
- 2021 – "Extendo" (Lele Blade feat. Paky)
- 2022 – "Cosa nostra" (Mikush feat. Paky)
- 2022 – "Copacabana" (Rhove feat. Paky)
- 2022 – "Giorni contati" (Night Skinny feat. Paky, Noyz Narcos, Geolier, Shiva)
- 2022 – "Prodotto" (Night Skinny feat. Ernia, Paky, Jake La Furia, Lazza)
- 2022 – "BTX Posse" (Night Skinny feat. Fabri Fibra, Ernia, Lazza, Tony Effe, Coez, Geolier, Guè, Paky, MamboLosco, L'immortale)
- 2022 – "Nella casa di Dio" (Sick Luke feat. Tony Effe, Paky, J Lord)
- 2022 – "Aqua dans la Mercedes" (Jul feat. Paky)
- 2023 – "Non ci torni più" (Geolier feat. Paky)
- 2023 – "Tuta maphia" (Guè feat. Paky)
- 2023 – "Bibidi bobidi bu" (Shiva feat. Paky)
