= Finem =

Albanian rapper (born 1998)

- Born: Klejdi Dogjani; 28 October 1998 (age 27); Tirana, Albania
- Years active: 2019–present
- Musical career
- Genres: Hip-Hop; Rap
- Occupations: Rapper, singer, songwriter
- Instruments: vocals

Klejdi Dogjani (born 28 October 1998), known professionally as Finem, is an Albanian rapper and songwriter. Active since 2019, he gained attention with a series of trap-leaning singles and collaborations that circulated widely in Albanian-language media and platforms.

== Career ==
Finem began releasing music in 2019 and gradually built an audience through independent singles. Media outlets have covered several of his releases, including the single "Lutem" (2023), noted for its personal narrative and tone.

In 2025, the media reported on a public moment unrelated to music, when Finem placed a bold bet in support of the Albania national football team prior to the match against Serbia. Television outlet Klan TV has also covered aspects of his public life.

== Musical style ==
Finem performs a rap/trap style with street-oriented themes. Albanian media have highlighted both the harder-edged and melodic sides of his catalog, noting his shift between personal storytelling and radio-friendly singles.

== Discography ==
=== Singles ===
Year	Song
2019	"Benzi" (feat. Solo)
2019	"K.P.T"
2019	"Jeni t'lodht" (feat. Solo)
2019	"N'katror"
2020	"Panama"
2020	"Elizabeta" (feat. Solo)
2020	"Gazi n'fund" (feat. Stresi)
2020	"S'je mo"
2020	"Për veti" (feat. Stresi)
2020	"Avioni"
2021	"KPT 2" (feat. Solo)
2021	"Adrenalina" (feat. Ardian Bujupi)
2021	"Ku je ti" (feat. Light)
2022	"Ajo Ajo" (feat. Solo)
2022	"Tipa" (feat. Solo, Selmo)
2022	"Anakonda"
2022	"Milano" (feat. Melinda)
2022	"Drill"
2023	"Meteor"
2023	"Gasolina"
2023	"Lutem"
2023	"9 Milly" (feat. De Facto)
2023	"Bagdad" (feat. Solo, BM)
2023	"Tirana" (feat. Paky)
2024	"Switch" (feat. Rvchet, BM, Geolier, Gue)
2024	"Alkool" (feat. Melinda)
2024	"Bella Vita" (feat. Light)
2024	"Bling Bling"
2025	"Stil Anakonde"
2025	"Paranoia" (feat. Solo)
2025	"Escobar"
2025	"77777"
2025	"Akoma"
2025	"One Shot" (feat. Solo)
2026	"Shi me gjemba"

== Media coverage ==
- Coverage of personal single with special meaning: Top Albania Radio (2023).
- Release report for "Lutem": Bota Sot (2023).
- Artist profile/romantic angle on a later single: Top Awards / Top Channel (2024).
- Public life coverage: TV Klan (2023).
- Sports-related public moment: Telegrafi (2025).
