= Solite pare =

Single by Sick Luke featuring Tha Supreme and Sfera Ebbasta

from the album X2
- Released: 7 January 2022
- Length: 3:31
- Label: Carosello
- Producers: Sick Luke; Tha Supreme

Sick Luke singles chronology
"La strega del frutteto" (2021)	"Solite pare" (2022)	"Vuoto dentro" (2022)

Tha Supreme singles chronology
"Moon" (2021)	"Solite pare" (2022)	"LNFP" (2022)

Sfera Ebbasta singles chronology
"Mi piace" (2021)	"Solite pare" (2022)	"Italiano Anthem" (2022)

"Solite pare" is a song by Italian record producer Sick Luke with featured vocals by rappers Tha Supreme and Sfera Ebbasta. It was released on 7 January 2022 by Carosello Records as the second single for Sick Luke's second studio album X2.

The song topped the FIMI singles chart and was certified double platinum in Italy.

== Charts ==
=== Weekly charts ===
Chart performance for "Solite pare"
Chart (2022)	Peak position
Italy (FIMI)	1
Italy Airplay (EarOne)	88

=== Year-end charts ===
2022 year-end chart performance for "Solite pare"
Chart	Position
Italy (FIMI)	36

== Certifications ==
Certification for "Solite pare"
Region	Certification	Certified units/sales
Italy (FIMI)	2× Platinum	200,000^{‡}
^{‡} Sales+streaming figures based on certification alone.
