= Dosseh =

Dosseh is a given name and a surname. It may refer to:

- Dosseh (rapper) (born 1985), French rapper of Cameroonian and Togolese origin
- Robert-Casimir Tonyui Messan Dosseh-Anyron (1925–2014), Togolese Roman Catholic archbishop
- Dosseh Attivi (born 1989), Togolese footballer
