= Forever (Rosa Chemical album) =

Studio album by Rosa Chemical
- Released: 28 May 2020
- Genre: Trap; Urban
- Length: 35:05
- Label: Thaurus; Universal Music Italy; Island Records
- Producer: Bdope; Dbackinyahead; Greg Willen; Luca La Piana; MACE; NIKENINJA

Singles from Forever
- 1. "Polka" Released: 6 March 2020; 2. "Lobby Way" Released: 17 April 2020; 3. "Boheme" Released: 21 May 2020

Singles from Forever and Ever
- 1. "Britney ;-)" Released: 19 February 2021

Forever is the debut studio album by Italian rapper Rosa Chemical, released on 28 May 2020 by Thaurus, Universal Music Italy and Island Records. The album was preceded by the singles "Polka", "Lobby Way" and "Boheme".

An expanded reissue including five new tracks, Forever and Ever, was released on 9 April 2021. The reissue was preceded by the single "Britney ;-)" featuring MamboLosco and Radical, released on 19 February 2021.

The songs "Londra" and "Polka 2 :-/" were certified gold by FIMI, "Polka" was certified platinum.

== Track listing ==
Forever track listing
No.	Title	Lyrics	Music	Producer(s)	Length
1.	"Rose & rovi"	Manuel Franco Rocati	Oscar Inglese; Vincenzo Di Bacco	Bdope; Dbackinyahead	3:08
2.	"Cosanostra"	Rocati	Inglese	Bdope	2:16
3.	"Lobby Way"	Rocati	Inglese; Di Bacco	Bdope; Dbackinyahead	2:51
4.	"Occhio e croce"	Rocati	Inglese	Bdope	2:14
5.	"Polka" (featuring Thelonious B.)	Rocati; Lorenzo Danieli; Adriano Accrocca	Gregory Taurone	Greg Willen	2:50
6.	"Slatt" (featuring Dani Faiv)	Rocati; Daniele Ceccaroni	Inglese	Bdope	2:48
7.	"Raf Simons"	Rocati	Luca La Piana	Luca La Piana	1:01
8.	"Londra" (featuring Rkomi)	Rocati; Mriko Manuele Martorana	Inglese	Bdope	3:14
9.	"Nuovi gay"	Rocati	Inglese	Bdope	3:30
10.	"Slime" (featuring Wayne Santana and MACE)	Rocati; Umberto Violo	Simone Benussi; Andrea Venerus	MACE	2:39
11.	"Boheme"	Rocati	Inglese	Bdope	3:20
12.	"Tu mi fai" (featuring Boro)	Rocati; Federico Orecchia	Inglese	Bdope	2:47
13.	"Paradiso"	Rocati	Davide Maruotti	NIKENINJA	2:20
Total length:					35:05

Forever and Ever - Reissue bonus tracks
No.	Title	Lyrics	Music	Producer(s)	Length
1.	"Britney ;-)" (featuring MamboLosco and Radical)	Rocati; William Miller Hickman III; Daniele Wandja	Inglese; Matteo Giovanni Amarù	Bdope; Mothz	3:13
2.	"No love :-)"	Rocati	Inglese; Andrea Moroni	Bdope; Andry The Hitmaker	3:10
3.	"Polka 2 :-/" (featuring Guè and Ernia)	Rocati; Cosimo Fini; Matteo Professione	Inglese	Bdope	3:27
4.	"Life :-("	Rocati	Inglese	Bdope	2:09
5.	"Fantasmi ;-("	Rocati	Inglese	Bdope	3:26

=== Notes ===
- All tracks in Forever and Ever are stylized in lowercase.

== Charts ==
Chart (2020)	Peak position
Italian Albums (FIMI)	8

== Certifications ==
Certifications for "Forever"
Region	Certification	Certified units/sales
Italy (FIMI)	Gold	25,000^{‡}
^{‡} Sales+streaming figures based on certification alone.
