= Racale =

Racale Griko: Iràklia
- Comune
- Comune di Racale
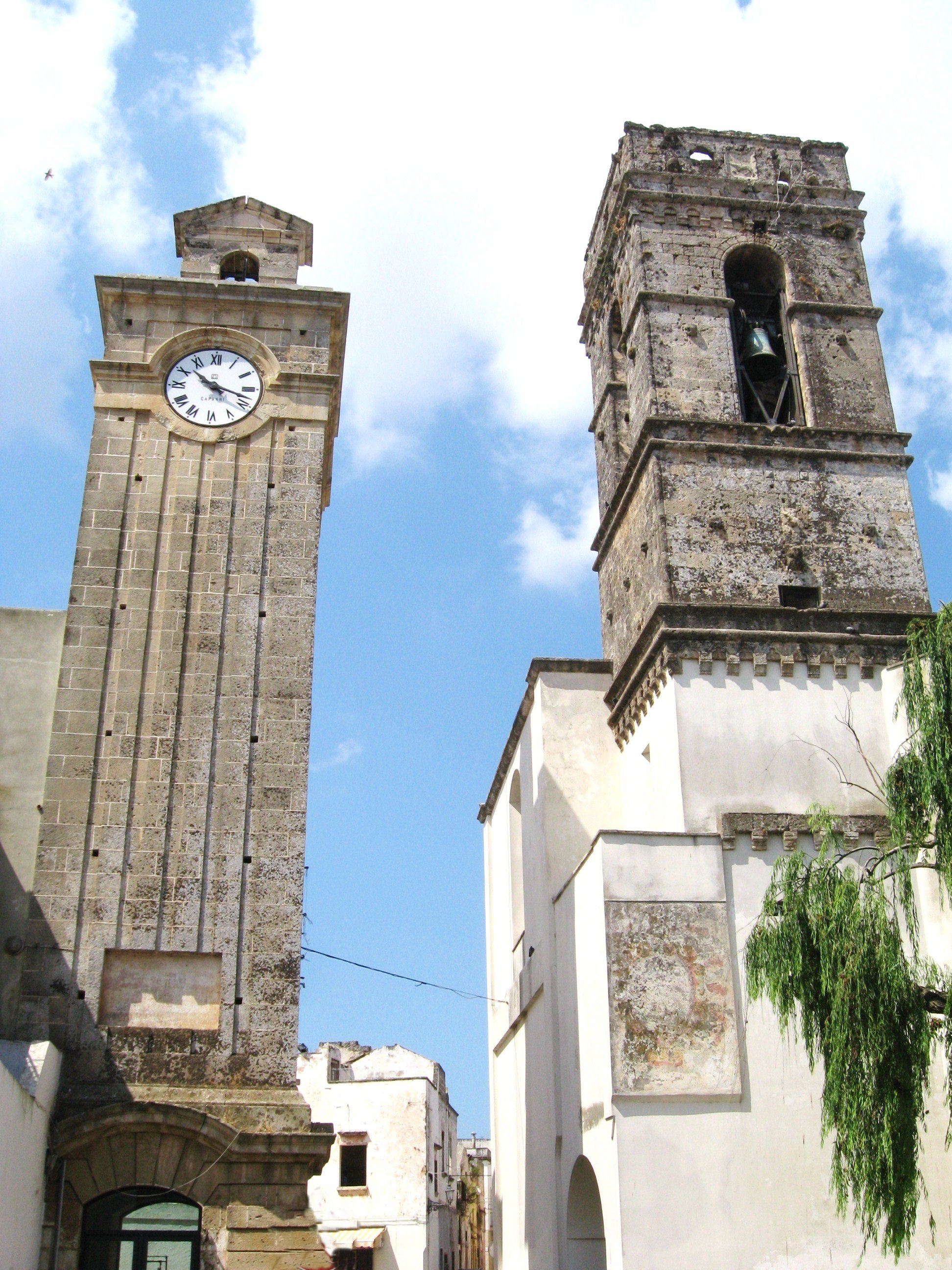
- View of Racale

- Coat of arms

- Location within Italy Location within Apulia
- Coordinates: 39°58′N 18°6′E
- Country: Italy
- Region: Apulia
- Province: Lecce (LE)
- Frazioni: Torre Suda

Government
  - Mayor: Donato Metallo

Area
  - Total: 24.29 km^{2} (9.38 sq mi)
- Elevation: 55 m (180 ft)

Population (1 January 2018)
  - Total: 11,011
  - Density: 453.3/km^{2} (1,174/sq mi)
- Demonym: Racalini
- Time zone: UTC+1 (CET)
  - Summer (DST): UTC+2 (CEST)
- Postal code: 73055
- Dialing code: 0833
- Patron saint: St. Sebastian
- Saint day: 20 January
- Website: Official website

Racale is a town and comune in the province of Lecce in the Apulia region of south-east Italy.
