= Dosseh Attivi =

Togolese footballer (born 1989)

Personal information
- Full name: Dosseh Gagnon Attivi
- Date of birth: 7 February 1989 (age 37)
- Place of birth: Atakpamé, Togo
- Height: 1.92 m (6 ft 3 1/2 in)
- Position: Defender

Senior career*
Years	Team	Apps	(Gls)
2010	Sisaket		
2011–2012	Air Force United		
2012–2013	United Sikkim	9	(1)
- * Club domestic league appearances and goals as of 11 February 2013

Dosseh Gagnon Attivi (born 7 February 1989) is a Togolese footballer who plays as a defender.

== Career ==
Attivi started his career in the Thai Premier League with Sisaket in 2010. He then moved to fellow Thai club, Air Force United till 2012.

Attivi then moved to India where he signed for newly promoted I-League club United Sikkim. He made his debut for the Indian side on 28 October 2012 against Dempo. He came on as a 54th-minute substitute for Sonam Bhutia as United Sikkim lost 1–2. He then scored his one and only goal for the club on 24 November 2012 against Pune. His 25th-minute strike was not good enough however as the match ended in a 2–2 draw. He was eventually released however by United Sikkim in 2013.
