= Wayne Santana =

- Born: Umberto Violo; 9 November 1991 (age 34); Rome, Lazio, Italy
- Occupation: Rapper
- Years active: 2014–present
- Labels: 777, Virgin, Warner

Umberto Violo (born 9 November 1991), known professionally as Wayne Santana, is an Italian rapper, former member of Dark Polo Gang.

== Career ==
Violo started his musical career in 2014 as a member of the trap collective Dark Polo Gang, along with Dark Side, Tony Effe, and Dark Pyrex. They grew up together in affluent neighborhoods of Rome and started rapping for fun during adolescence. Their discography began with the 2015 mixtape Full Metal Dark, which was available for free download, followed by solo mixtapes. Wayne Santana released his mixtape Succo di zenzero on 19 May 2016. Their subsequent albums achieved great success, reaching the number one spot on the FIMI Albums Chart three times with Twins (2017), Trap Lovers (2018), and Dark Boys Club (2020). In 2021, the group went on hiatus to pursue solo careers.

On 2 December 2021, Wayne Santana released his first single, "Marmellata", featuring Italian rappers Radical, Rosa Chemical, and Tony Effe. On 21 January 2022, he released his debut solo studio album, Succo di zenzero Vol. 2, which debuted at number 9 on the FIMI Album Chart.

In September 2024, he released the EP Una notte a Milano.

== Discography ==
=== Studio albums ===
List of solo studio albums, with details and chart positions
Title	Details	Peak chart positions
Title	Details	ITA
Succo di zenzero Vol. 2	Released: 21 January 2022; Label: Virgin	9
No Title	Released: 11 September 2026; Label: Universal	—

=== EPs ===
Title	Album details
Una notte a Milano	Release date: 5 September 2024; Label: Warner

=== Mixtapes ===
Title	Album details
Succo di zenzero	Release date: 19 May 2016; Label: Self-published, Universal (re-release)
