= Kid Yugi =

Italian rapper (born 2001)

- Born: Francesco Stasi; 14 April 2001 (age 25); Massafra, Apulia, Italy
- Genres: Hip-hop; conscious hip-hop; hardcore hip-hop
- Occupation: Rapper
- Instrument: Vocals
- Works: Discography
- Years active: 2017–present
- Labels: Thaurus Music; Underdog Music; Universal Music Italia; Virgin Music

Francesco Stasi (born 14 April 2001), known professionally as Kid Yugi, is an Italian rapper.

== Biography ==
=== 2018-2022: debut and The Globe ===
He started rapping during his high school years, in the Apulian collective Saints Mob, which was active between 2018 and 2021. The musical roster was composed of Kid Yugi (at the time called Abisso and then Lil Killua; rapper), Ill Santo (rapper and producer), Niceboy Balenci (at the time Dilemetz; rapper), YanGL (at the time Asmod; rapper), Utile (at the time Utile Marco; rapper), Lil Plësto (producer), VARX (producer) and Lasaintbruh (producer). Ginko (graphic designer), Alessio Mariano (director/photographer), Nello art (graphic designer) and Pharina (photographer) were also part of it. In the meantime, he graduated from the scientific high school "D. De Ruggeri" in his hometown, Massafra in the province of Taranto.

In 2022, he released his first official single as Kid Yugi, "Grammelot". With the release of the song, he attracted the attention of the Thaurus record label, with which he released the singles "Sturm und drang", "Kabuki", and "King Lear". With rapper 18k, he released "No Kizzy," which was later included on the latter's album. In October 2022, he released the single "DEM," a collaboration with rappers Tony Boy and Artie 5ive.

His first album, The Globe, was released in November 2022. It went platinum, featuring guest appearances by Kira, Sosa Priority, Artie 5ive and Tony Boy. The album's name refers to Shakespeare's Globe Theatre, which was an open-air theater, drawing parallels with street life, which often leads to pretending, as in the theater. It contains three gold-certified songs: "Grammelot", "Il filmografo" and "Il ferro di Čechov".

=== 2023–2025: commercial success and I nomi del diavolo ===
On September 23, 16767, he opened the Marrageddon Festival by Marracash in Milan, with Grammelot, Paradiso artificiale and Sintetico, broadcast live by Amazon Music and Radio M2o. Around the same time, he was involved in Salmo and Noyz Narcos' collaborative album Cvlt, contributing to the omonym track.

In 2024, in January and February respectively, he released the singles Paganini and L'anticristo before the release, in March, of the second album I nomi del diavolo, which debuted directly at the top of the weekly FIMI Albums Chart and it received platinum certification, while also receaving positive feedback on television, with the Italian news program TG1 dedicating a short report to it. The album was also placed at the top of the Spotify Top Albums Debut Global chart, i.e. the chart of the most listened to new albums of the first days of March at a global level, excluding the USA. There is the participation of rappers Tony Boy, Artie 5ive, Tedua, Papa V, Noyz Narcos, Ernia, Simba La Rue, Geolier and Sfera Ebbasta and a sampling of the Taranto singer Fido Guido. I nomi del diavolo, like the previous The Globe, is a concept album, in this case inspired, among other references, by William Golding's novel Lord of the Flies.

On 4 April was featured as a guest artist on producer Mace's third album, Māyā. He later also appeared on the albums Milano Angels by Shiva, Locura by Lazza and Containers by The Night Skinny. On 1 November he released the deluxe version of his latest album, entitled Tutti i nomi del diavolo, preceded by the release of the single "Donna". The album adds six tracks to the previous ones already on the album I nomi del diavolo. These are: "6sei6," a collaboration with Massimo Pericolo; "Donna," "S.X.S.I.C." (a remake of Bassi Maestro's "S.I.C."); "Loki and Modalità demonio," and "Diablo" (a collaboration with Glocky), along with the original version of "Ex angelo," without Sfera Ebbasta's verse.

In 2025, he appeared on Jake La Furia's album Fame with the track "Viagra", and later collaborated with Apulian rapper Rrari dal Tacco on the single "Bianca". He also appeared on Ernia's album Per soldi e per amore with the track "Fellini", Papa V's EP Latte in polvere and Night Skinny with the track "Mossa strepitosa", Noyz Narcos album Funny Games with the track "Il mio amico" and Paky's album Gloria with the track "I soldi parlano".

=== 2025–present: Anche gli eroi muoiono ===
The single "Berserker" was released on 17 December 2025, followed in January 2026 by the single "Push It", a duet with Anna. The two singles preceded his third studio album, Anche gli eroi muoiono, released on 30 January. The album topped the FIMI chart and was certified platinum; the second track, "La violenza necessaria" featuring Shiva, peaked at number one on the singles chart. He also collaborated with Geolier for the track "Olè" in the album Tutto è possibile.

In November 2026, he reached the top of the Italian singles chart with the single "Sentire la musica".

== Themes ==
Kid Yugi's rap is characterized by its references to theatre, cinema and literature. Frequent topics of his songs are the denunciation of the situation of Ilva in Taranto and the deaths it caused, love, guns and drug dealing.

== Discography ==
- The Globe (2022)
- I nomi del diavolo (2024)
- Anche gli eroi muoiono (2026)
