= Dark Polo Gang =

Italian trap band

DPG
- Origin: Rome, Italy
- Genres: Hip hop; trap
- Years active: 2014–2021
- Label: Triplosette Entertainment
- Past members: Tony Effe (Nicolò Rapisarda); Dark Pyrex (Principe Pyrex); Wayne Santana; Side Baby
- Website: www.darkpologang.com

Dark Polo Gang was an Italian trap musical group from Rome founded by Tony Effe, Side Baby, Wayne Santana and Dark Pyrex in 2014.

Dark Polo Gang is known to have emerged to fame without the help or support of a major, having produced music tracks and video clips independently. They rely on an emerging independent record label called Triplosette Entertainment, of which all contributors are none other than the members of the Gang, longtime friends.

Most of their publications were produced by beatmaker Sick Luke, who can be considered the fifth member of the group.

== History of the group ==
The four initial members of the group, Arturo Bruni (Dark Side), Nicolò Rapisarda (Tony Effe), Dylan Thomas Cerulli (Dark Pyrex or Principe Pyrex) and Umberto Violo (Dark Wayne or Wayne Santana), have known each other since childhood growing up in the affluent neighborhoods of Rome (Rione Monti, Trastevere, Campo de 'Fiori). During adolescence they start rapping for fun until Sick Luke, the son of Duke Montana, convinced them to produce some songs seriously. On 22 May 2018, the father of Arturo Bruni (Dark Side) announced the withdrawal from the group of the latter and the beginning of his solo career.

In 2015 the first mixtape called Full Metal Dark was released, available for free download, followed by three individual albums: Crack musica by Tony and Side, Wayne's Succo di zenzero and Pyrex's The Dark Album.

In 2017 the album Twins was released, which debuted at the top of the FIMI Album Ranking. In August 2017 the single Caramelle was certified platinum by FIMI, while Cono Gelato and Sportswear were certified gold records by the same body.

In 2018 the DarkSide's mixtape came out, entirely produced by Sick Luke, called Sick Side.

The first album without Dark side was released 28 September 2018, and it's called Trap Lovers, and it is produced by Sick Luke, Chris Nolan and Michele Canova lorfida.

== Issues ==
Under a veiled self-irony, the core of the texts sung by the group consists of a critique of modern rap, now known to everyone. The Gang, moreover, deals with globalization and the need to adapt to its rules to become rich and famous, which has always been the sole objective of the Gang itself. Drugs, the underworld, the passion for fashion, money and love are among the issues mainly dealt with by the group. Using a flow based on assonance, it is usual to use terms belonging to juvenile slang and typical trap sounds, various references to the cult characters of real life and neologisms belonging to the "alien" world of which they belong and which define themselves as such.

== Disputes ==
Despite the growing and now achieved success, the Dark Polo Gang is also very criticized and mocked on the web by most of the Italian hip hop supporters. The main causes of this are the lack of content, the 'disconnected' phrases, apparently meaningless, and the attached non-closed rhymes that often appear in their texts. Distinguished by a constant arrogance and borderline attitudes, the use of scenarios and themes that, according to some, "do not belong" to what is really the origin of the Roman collective, is also strongly a source of criticism.

The Dark Polo Gang received dissing from various rappers, including: Achille Lauro, Gemitaiz, Inoki and Shade.

== Members ==
- Dark Side – voice (2014–2018)
- Tony Effe – voice (2014–2021)
- Pyrex – voice (2014–2021)
- Wayne Santana – voice (2014–2021)
- Sick Luke – producer (2014–2021)

== Discography ==
=== Studio albums ===
- 2017 – Twins (Tony Effe, Wayne)
- 2018 – Trap Lovers (Tony Effe, Wayne, Pyrex)

=== Mixtapes ===
- 2015 – Full Metal Dark (Tony Effe, Wayne Santana, Pyrex, Side)
- 2016 – Crack Musica (Tony Effe, Side)
- 2016 – Succo di zenzero (Wayne Santana)
- 2016 – The Dark Album (Pyrex)
- 2018 – Sick Side (Side)
- 2020 - Dark Boys Club (Tony Effe, Wayne Santana, Pyrex)

=== Singles ===
- 2014 – Ghost Track
- 2014 – Grenoble
- 2014 – Terra bruciata
- 2014 – Hypervenom
- 2014 – Branco di iene
- 2015 – Ciaga
- 2015 – Chiudi quella porta
- 2015 – Totti e De Rossi
- 2015 – Numeri uno
- 2015 – Toro meccanico
- 2015 – Toro bravo
- 2015 – Terra
- 2015 – Daytona in cella
- 2015 – Non si vede
- 2016 – Cosa?
- 2016 – Sportswear
- 2017 – Spezzacuori
- 2017 – Magazine
- 2017 – Caramelle (feat. Peachwalnut)
- 2018 – British
- 2018 – Cambiare adesso
