= Izi (rapper) =

Italian rapper (born 1995)

- Born: Diego Germini; 30 July 1995 (age 31); Savigliano, Piedmont, Italy
- Genres: Hip hop
- Occupations: Rapper; actor
- Years active: 2013–present
- Labels: Island; Sony Music

Diego Germini (born 30 July 1995), known professionally as Izi, is an Italian rapper and actor.

His studio albums Pizzicato (2017) and Aletheia (2019) peaked number 1 of FIMI's albums chart.

== Biography ==
=== Early years and Fenice ===
Born in province of Cuneo, he grew up in Cogoleto, in province of Genoa. At the age of 17 he abandoned school and ran away from home, starting to experience a period of wandering during which he also had to deal with a diabetic coma. At the same time, he began to write songs and perform them, inspired both by Italian and international rappers and by songwriters on the Italian scene.

In the first years of activity he went by various pseudonyms, such as Eazyrhymes and then Izi Erre. Furthermore, he joined the crew Wild Bandana and adopted the definitive pseudonym Izi for the assonance with the English term "easy". In 2015 he appeared, together with Tedua, in the song Mercedes nero by Sfera Ebbasta and Charlie Charles, taken from the album XDVR. The following year he collaborated with Tedua on the song Circonvalley, from Orange County Mixtape.

In 2016 he was chosen by director Cosimo Alemà as the protagonist of the film Zeta - Una storia hip-hop, in which he plays a young rapper in search of fame. Following the release of the film, Izi released his first studio album Fenice, preceded by the single Scusa. In July of the same year, following the rapper's participation in the social party of the Croce d'oro of Sciarborasca, during which the artist's performance was interrupted prematurely because, according to the organizers, he had sung rhymes against the authorities, Izi was caught by the police of Arenzano with a quantity of marijuana that exceeded that of personal use, resulting in a complaint against him.

Around the same time, Izi collaborated with Charlie Charles on the single Niagara, released on 19 December 2016. The collaboration was renewed in March 2017 with the single Bimbi, which also featured rappers Rkomi, Sfera Ebbasta, Tedua, and Ghali. Izi also took part in Tedua's song Telefonate, included in the album Orange County California, released in January 2017.

=== Pizzicato and Aletheia ===
In May 2017 he released his second album Pizzicato, preceded by about a month by the single Pianto. On the album he collaborates with other artists belonging to the Italian hip hop scene, including Fabri Fibra and Caneda. The second single from the album was 4GETU. In December 2017 the album Pezzi by DJ producer The Night Skinny was released, in which Izi appears in the song 6 A.M. with Gué Pequeno.

In October 2018 the single Fumo da solo was released with the production of Charlie Charles and Thasup, as the first preview of his third studio album. In January 2019 it was the turn of the title Magico. After a collaboration with French rapper Dosseh on the remix of the single Habitué, Izi released his album Aletheia, preceded by the second single Dammi un motivo.

In July 2019, Machete Mixtape 4 was released, in which Izi is present in Mammastomale, a song recorded together with Gemitaiz and Salmo. In the same year Mattoni by The Night Skinny was also released, in which Izi is present in the song Mille strade together with rapper Ketama126.

=== Riot ===
On 30 October 2020 his fourth album Riot was released, preceded by the single Pusher.

In 2022 he is among the protagonists of the documentary La nuova scuola genovese by Claudio Cabona, directed by Yuri Dellacasa and Paolo Fossati, which narrates the common thread that links Ligurian songwriting to the hip hop scene that has established itself since the 2000s. On 10 February 2023, on the occasion of the fourth evening of the 73rd Sanremo Festival, dedicated to covers, he duetted with Madame singing the song Via del Campo by Fabrizio De André.

== Discography ==
=== Studio albums ===
- Fenice (2016)
- Pizzicato (2017)
- Aletheia (2019)
- Riot (2020)

=== Mixtapes ===
- Macchie di Rorshach, with Sangue (2013)
- Kidnapped Mixtape (2014)
- Julian Ross Mixtape (2015)

== Filmography ==
Year	Title	Role	Notes
2016	Zeta - Una storia hip hop	Alex "Zeta"	Lead role, feature film debut
