= Shiva (rapper) =

Italian rapper and singer (born 1999)

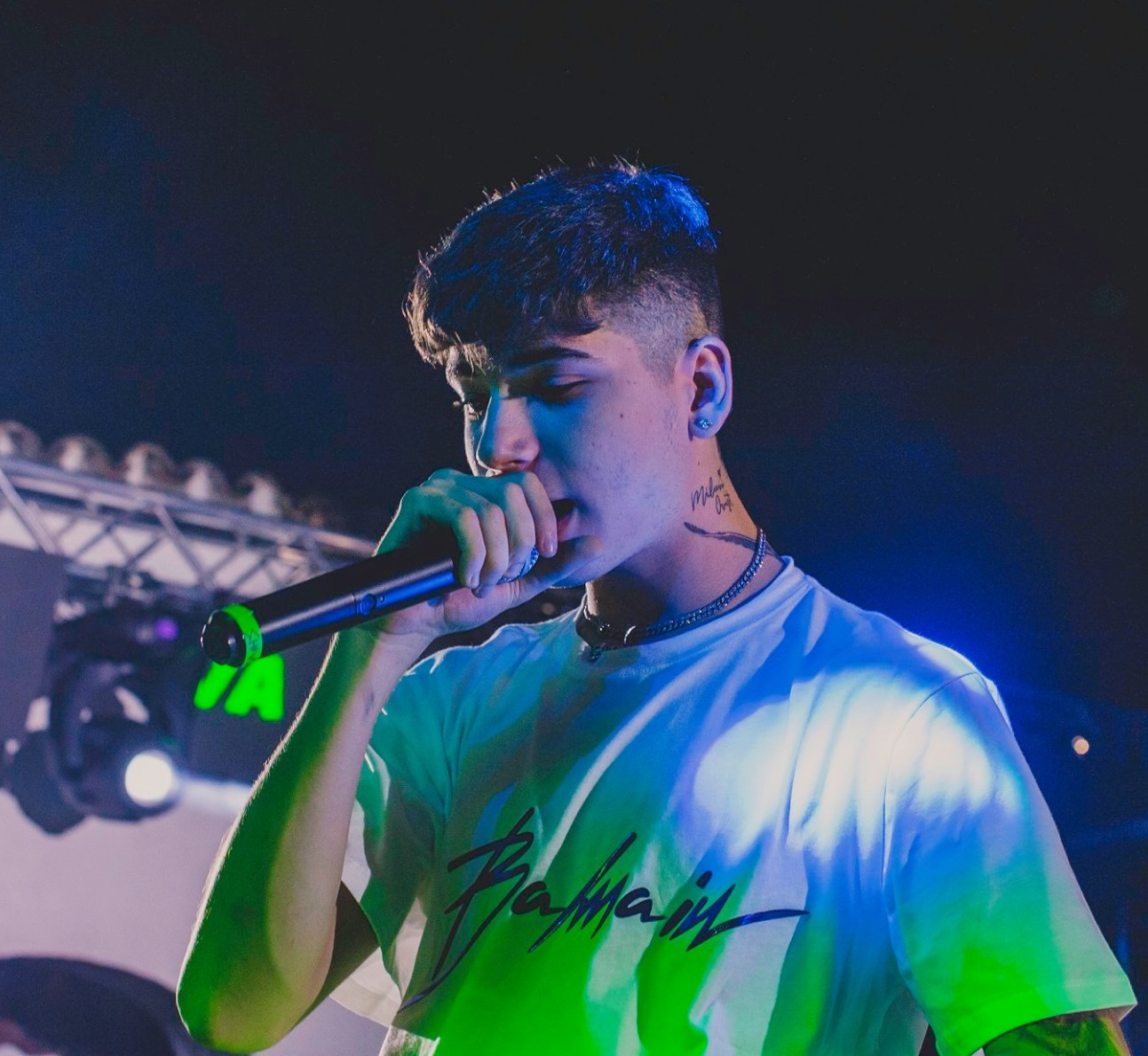
- Shiva in 2020

Background information
- Born: Andrea Arrigoni; 27 August 1999 (age 27); Milan, Lombardy, Italy
- Genres: Hip hop; trap
- Occupations: Rapper
- Years active: 2015–present
- Labels: Columbia; Sony

Andrea Arrigoni (born 27 August 1999), known by the stage name Shiva, is an Italian rapper.

== Early life ==
Born in Legnano to a wealthy family, he grew up in the Milan metropolitan area in Corsico. For a short period he moved to Tuscany, a region where he became interested in street art and music, particularly rap and punk.

== Career ==
=== 2014-2018: Beginnings ===
Shiva began his musical career at the age of 14 in 2013, releasing his first EP "La via del guerriero" on SoundCloud in 2014.

In 2015, he released his first self-produced video for the song "Cotard Delusion", followed by the music video for "Anima" and "Nuvola Bianca", the latter being a song produced by Yazee. In the same year he signed a contract with the Roman record label Honiro Label, with which he released his first album Tempo anima in 2017. In September, Shiva was among the collaborators on the album Ogni maledetto giorno by Mostro, being featured in the song "Amore sporchi". The music videos for Corvi, Buio, Spirito and Amen were also released.

In March 2018, he released his second album Solo. The album was accompanied by the music videos of "Ragazzi Miei", "Fuoco", and "Esse".

=== 2019-2020: Early successes ===
In 2019, Shiva released the singles "Mon fre", a duet with Emis Killa, and "Bossoli". Both tracks received certified platinum status by the Italian Music Industry Federation. In the same year he collaborated with numerous artists of the Italian hip hop scene, including Sfera Ebbasta with the single "Soldi in nero", which attained the position of second in the Top Singles chart.

On 31 January 2020, he released the EP Routine, preceded by the single "Calmo"; the latter was recorded in collaboration with Tha Supreme and which it reached the top of the Top Singles chart, becoming Shiva's first number one hit. The EP however entered the FIMI Album Chart in second place. On March 26, the rapper released the single "Auto blu", which features a sample of "Blue (Da Ba Dee)" by Eiffel 65, who were credited as guest artists. The track was harshly criticized by rap purists who were his fans, but it also quickly became very famous despite the criticism.

=== 2021-2022: Dolce vita and Dark Love EP ===
On 11 June 2021, Shiva released his third studio album Dolce vita. He promoted it with the songs "La mia storia", "Fendi Belt" and "Non sai niente". On November 19, the standalone single "Take 3" was released, followed on December 17 by "Aston Martin" featuring British rapper Headie One.

On 24 June 2022, Shiva released the EP Dark Love EP, preceded by the singles "Pensando a lei" and "Niente da perdere". On November 25, his fourth studio album Milano Demons was also released, preceded by the singles "Soldi pulite", "Non è Easy", "3 Stick Freestyle" and "Take 4".

=== 2023-2024: Santana Season and Milano Angels ===
On June 9, 2023, Shiva released his fifth album Santana Season, preceding the release by a single: "100 Opps". On September 14, the rapper released the single "Syrup" produced by Finesse. The single "Milano Shotta Freestyle" was released on 10 January 2024, followed by "First Day Out" released on 22 May 2024.

On 28 August 2024, he released the single "Take 5". On September 6, his sixth studio album Milano Angels was released, which features Italian and international collaborations, including Paky, Tedua, Geolier, Mondo Marcio, NLE Choppa, Lil Tjay, Tony Boy and Kid Yugi.

=== 2025-present: Vangelo ===
On 25 November 2025, Shiva released the single "Take 6", which debuted at number one in the Top Singles chart. The song anticipated the seventh studio album Vangelo, released on 10 April 2026. It was made available with four limited edition covers representing "Betrayal", "Condemnation", "Death" and "Resurrection". The project consists of thirteen tracks, including six collaborations with Anna, Geolier, Kid Yugi, Lazza, Sfera Ebbasta and Tiziano Ferro.

== Personal life ==
Shiva has two sons from his relationship with Laura Maisano. His sons were born in December 2023 and September 2025, respectively. In November 2025, he welcomed his third son, born to a different woman.

=== Judicial proceedings ===
On the evening of 11 July 2023, Shiva was attacked in the courtyard of his record company by two young people belonging to rapper Rondodasosa's crew, who were tasked by Rondo to attack Shiva for insults Shiva had made. After suffering a blow with a brass knuckle that fractured his jaw, Shiva fired four gunshots towards the attackers, wounding them in the legs. On 26 October 2023, Shiva was arrested for attempted murder, illegal possession of weapons (including two machetes and a compressed air gun) and receiving stolen goods. On 21 February 2024, after four months of detention at the San Vittore prison, the judge, after preliminary investigations, relaxed the precautionary measure, granting him house arrest. On 10 July, he was sentenced at first instance by the Court of Milan to a sentence of 6 1/2 years in prison. He was ultimately convicted of attempted murder, but negotiated against the revocation of his house arrest by March 2025.

== Discography ==
=== Studio albums ===
- Tempo anima (2017)
- Solo (2018)
- Dolce Vita (2021)
- Milano Demons (2022)
- Santana Season (2023)
- Milano Angels (2024)
- Santana Money Gang (2025) with Sfera Ebbasta
- Vangelo (2026)

=== EPs ===
- Routine (2020)
- Dark Love (2022)
