= Sick Luke =

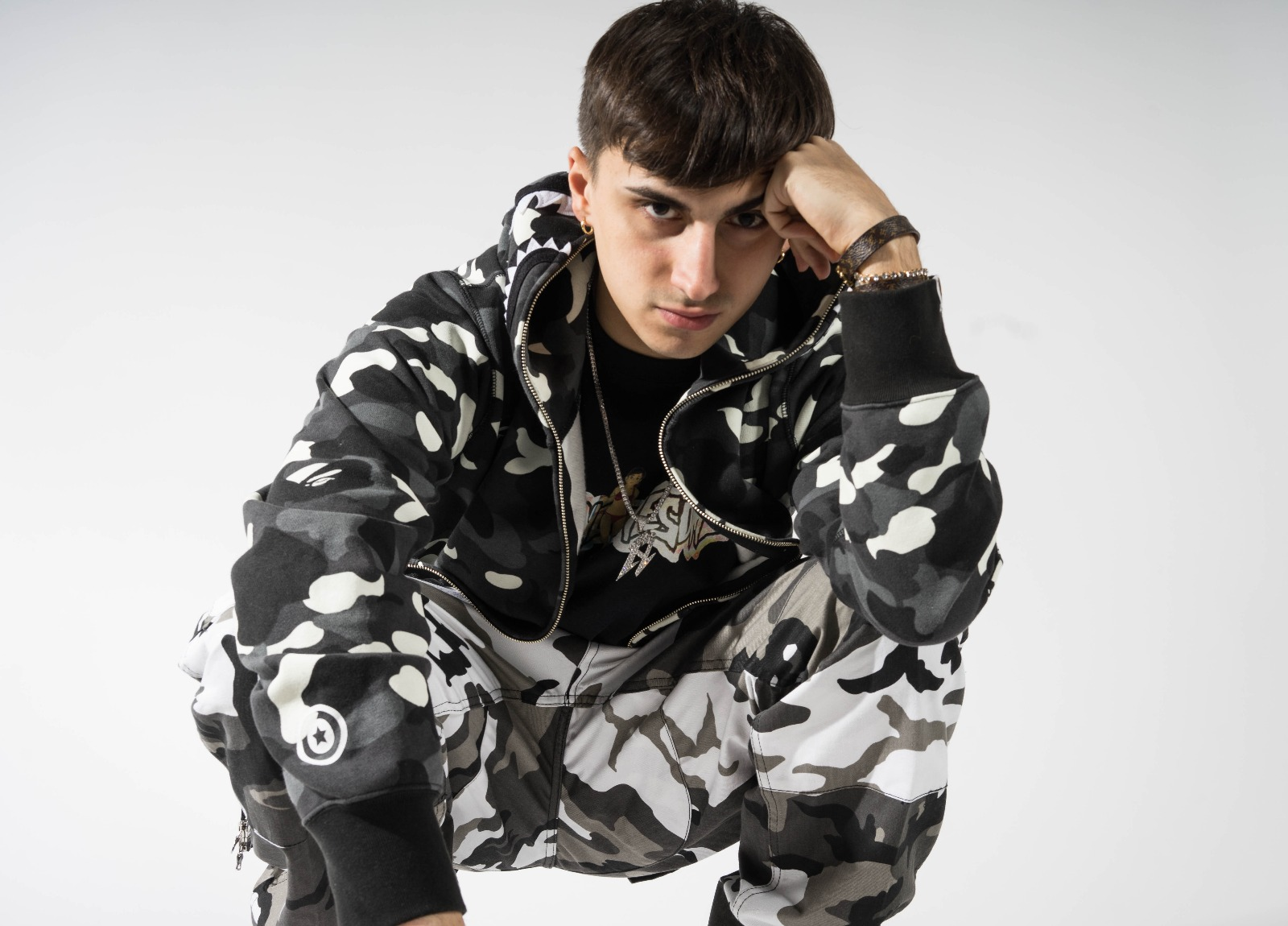
- Sick Luke in 2018

Background information
- Born: Luca Antonio Barker; 17 August 1994 (age 32); London, United Kingdom
- Genres: Hip hop; pop; pop rap; R&B; trap
- Occupation: Record producer
- Years active: 2010–present
- Labels: Universal; Carosello; Virgin

Luca Antonio Barker (born 17 August 1994), known professionally as Sick Luke, is an Italian record producer and beatmaker.

== Career ==
Sick Luke, son of rapper Duke Montana, has been involved in music from a young age, starting to compose beats at thirteen and officially debuting with "Making Moves" on his father's album Grindz Musik I. He has collaborated with his father on tour and released several mixtapes under the Honiro Label, producing beats for numerous artists such as Sfera Ebbasta, Luchè, Izi, and Ghali.

In 2015, he met the Roman collective Dark Polo Gang, producing their mixtape Full Metal Dark and other works, including Crack musica, Succo di zenzero, and The Dark Album. With Dark Polo Gang, he also released the album Twins, which topped the FIMI Albums Chart. Subsequently, he signed with Universal Music. In 2019, he collaborated with Mecna on the joint album Neverland.

In 2022, he released his studio album X2, which topped the Italian chart and was certified double platinum. The single "Solite pare", featuring Tha Supreme and Sfera Ebbasta, also reached the number-one position on the chart and achieved double platinum.

== Discography ==
=== Studio albums ===
- Neverland with Mecna (2019)
- X2 (2022)
- Dopamina (2025)
