= Pyrex (rapper) =

- Also known as: Dark Pyrex; Dylan
- Born: Dylan Thomas Cerulli; 2 May 1994 (age 31); Rome, Lazio, Italy
- Occupation: Rapper
- Years active: 2014–present

Dylan Thomas Cerulli (born 2 May 1994), known professionally as Pyrex or Dylan, is an Italian rapper, former member of Dark Polo Gang.

== Career ==
Cerulli started his musical career in 2014 as a member of the trap collective Dark Polo Gang, along with Dark Side, Tony Effe, and Wayne Santana. They grew up together in affluent neighborhoods of Rome and started rapping for fun during adolescence. Their discography began with the 2015 mixtape Full Metal Dark, which was available for free download, followed by solo mixtapes. Pyrex released his mixtape The Dark Album on 31 October 2016. Their subsequent albums achieved great success, reaching the number one spot on the FIMI Albums Chart three times with Twins (2017), Trap Lovers (2018), and Dark Boys Club (2020). In 2021, the group went on hiatus to pursue solo careers.

In 2022, Pyrex released the singles "Sinfonia della distruzione" and "Per averti", the latter in collaboration with Rkomi, which was certified gold. On 11 May 2023, his debut solo album, Love Is War, was released under the name Dylan, peaking at number 18 on the Italian chart.

Pyrex's second studio album, King of Dark, was released on 13 February 2026. Its third track, "Darkmoney", featuring Sfera Ebbasta, reached number one on the FIMI Singles Chart.

== Personal life ==
From 2018 to 2021, Pyrex was in a relationship with actress Alice Pagani.

== Discography ==
=== Studio albums ===
Title	Details	Peak chart positions
Title	Details	ITA
Love Is War	Released: 11 May 2023; Label: Island, Universal	18
King of Dark	Released: 13 February 2026; Label: Island, Universal	4

=== Mixtapes ===
Title	Details	Peak chart positions
Title	Details	ITA
The Dark Album	Release date: 31 October 2016; Label: Triplosette	80
