= Side Baby =

Italian singer and rapper

- Also known as: DarkSideBaby
- Born: Arturo Bruni; 13 September 1994 (age 32); Rome, Lazio, Italy
- Occupation: Rapper
- Years active: 2014–present
- Label: Universal Music Group

Arturo Bruni (born 13 September 1994), known professionally as Side Baby, is an Italian rapper and former member of Dark Polo Gang.

== Biography ==
Son of the Italian director and screenwriter Francesco Bruni, he played a role in the 2011 film Easy! and 2017 film Everything You Want, both written and directed by his father. He was a member of the Roman trap group Dark Polo Gang from 2014 to 2018.

The following month he starts publishing content on social media, especially SoundCloud, under the name of Side Baby (or even as Arturo), thus removing the "Dark" prefix. In April 2019, he released his first album for Universal Music, which takes its title from his first name, Arturo. His second studio album, Il ritorno del vero, was released in 2021.

On 13 September 2024, he released Leggendario. The album is described as being aligned with Side Baby's roots by maintaining his stylistic signature. The album includes multiple well-known Italian producers on its tracks.

On 13 March 2026, he released Crack musica II in collaboration with Tony Effe. The album debuted at the top of the album charts and the best-selling vinyl charts on the week of its release, in the week calculated from March 12 to March 19. It is a sequel to the first mixtape, Crack musica, released ten years prior in 2016 by Dark Polo Gang. The release of this sequel mixtape also led to the first Crack musica mixtape reaching rank twelve on the charts and third among vinyls.

== Discography ==
=== Solo ===
Studio albums

Title	Details	Peak chart positions
Title	Details	ITA
Arturo	Released: 19 April 2019; Label: Island, Universal; Format: CD, digital download	3
Il ritorno del vero	Released: 25 June 2021; Label: Intersuoni; Format: CD, digital download	19
Leggendario	Released: 13 September 2024; Label: Warner Music Italy; Format: CD, LP, digital download	11
Crack musica II (with Tony Effe)	Released: 13 March 2026; Label: Island; Format: CD, LP, digital download	1

Singles

Title	Year	Peak chart positions	Album
Title	Year	ITA	Album
"Medicine"	2018	—	Non-album single
"Nuvola" (with DrefGold)	2018	10	Kanaglia
"Non sei capace"	2019	—	Non-album single
"Rip RMX" (featuring Shiva)	2019	86	Arturo
"Non mi fido" (with Psicologi)	2020	96	Non-album single
"Fontanelle e sanpietrini"	2021	—	Il ritorno del vero
"2016"	2021	—	Il ritorno del vero
"Pop Up" (with Reggie Mills and Smokepurpp)	2021	—	The Italian Job
"Gossip" (featuring Mikush)	2022	—	Non-album singles
"Tutto chiede salvezza"	2022	—	Non-album singles
"Padrino"	2023	—	Leggendario
"F**k the Club Up" (featuring Diss Gacha)	2023	—	Leggendario
"Bad Bitch" (featuring Niky Savage)	2024	—	Leggendario
"NA/RM" (featuring MV Killa e Yung Snapp)	2024	—	Leggendario
"Soldi & musica" (featuring Frezza)	2025	—	Leggendario (RXX Edition)
"Volermi morto"	2025	—	Leggendario (RXX Edition)

As featured artist

Title	Year	Peak chart positions	Album
Title	Year	ITA	Album
"Comete" (Zoda featuring Side Baby)	2019	88	Ufo
"Harem" (Axos featuring Side Baby and Don Joe)	2019	—	Non-album single
"Che Dio ci salvi" (Il Profeta featuring Side Baby)	2020	—	Il Profeta
"Radici" (Oni One featuring Side Baby)	2021	—	Non-album single
"Lamborghini" (Niko Pandetta featuring Side Baby)	2022	—	Bella vita Deluxe Edition
"Eddie Guerrero" (Rayan e Intifaya featuring Side Baby)	2023	—	4ever Young (Deluxe)
"Corviale Testaccio" (Uzi Lvke featuring Side Baby)	2024	—	Non-album single
"Pettinato" (Il Ghost featuring Side Baby)	2024	—	Bisha

=== Dark Polo Gang ===
- Full Metal Dark (2015)
- Crack musica (2016)
- Sick Side (2018)

== Filmography ==
=== Film and television ===
Year	Title	Role(s)	Notes
2011	Easy!		Film debut
2017	Friends by Chance	Riccardo	
2018	Dark Polo Gang: The Series	Himself	Docuseries
2022	2016: L'anno della trap	Himself	Documentary
