= Blanco discography =

Discography of Italian singer-songwriter Blanco

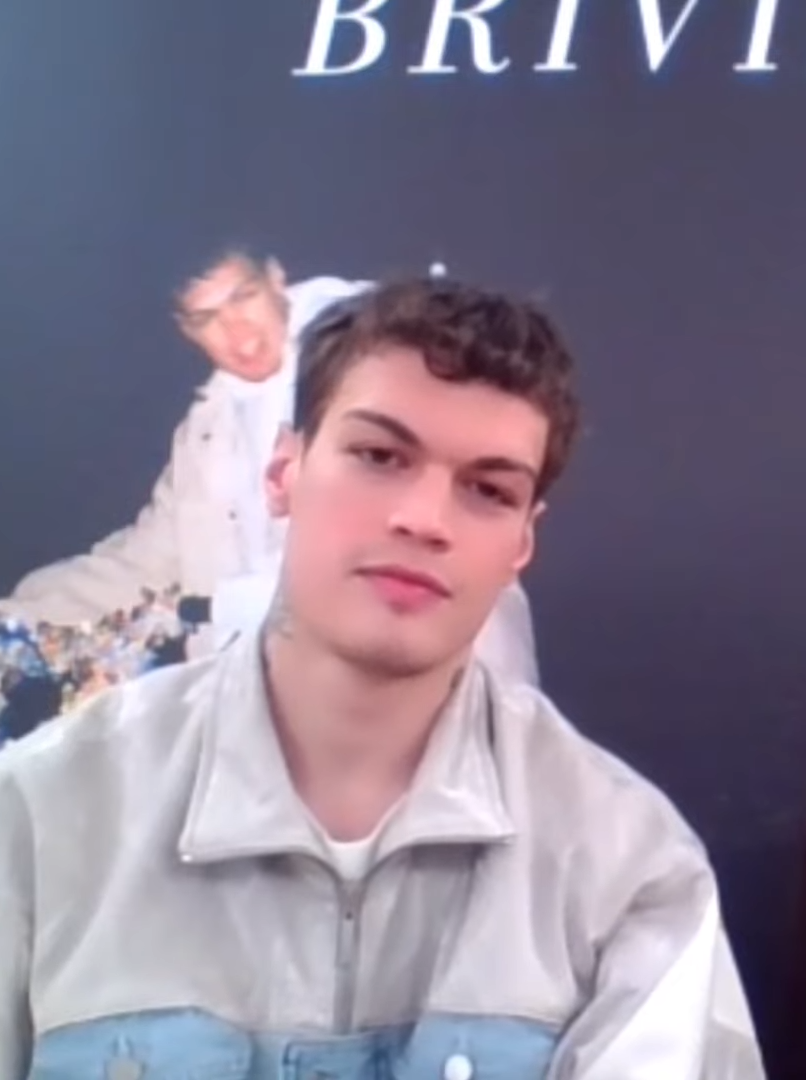
- Blanco in 2022
- Studio albums: 3
- Singles: 18
- Music videos: 17

The discography of Italian singer-songwriter Blanco consists of three studio albums and eighteen singles.

== Studio albums ==
List of studio albums, with chart positions and certifications
Title	Album details	Peak chart positions		Certifications
Title	Album details	ITA	SWI	Certifications
Blu celeste	Released: 10 September 2021; Label: Universal, Island; Format: CD, LP, digital download, streaming	1	11	FIMI: 7× Platinum
Innamorato	Released: 14 April 2023; Label: Universal, Island; Format: CD, LP, digital download, streaming	1	6	FIMI: 2× Platinum
Ma'	Released: 2 April 2026; Label: Universal, EMI; Format: CD, LP, digital download, streaming	2	27	FIMI: Gold

== Singles ==
=== As lead artist ===
List of singles as lead artist, with selected chart positions, showing year released and album name
Title	Year	Peak chart positions								Certifications	Album
Title	Year	ITA	GRE	LTU	LUX	SPA	SWE	SWI	WW	Certifications	Album
"Belladonna (Adieu)"	2020	—	—	—	—	—	—	—	—	FIMI: Gold	Non-album single
"Notti in bianco"	2020	2	—	—	—	—	—	—	—	FIMI: 6× Platinum	Blu celeste
"Ladro di fiori"	2020	16	—	—	—	—	—	—	—	FIMI: 2× Platinum	Blu celeste
"La canzone nostra" (with Mace and Salmo)	2021	1	—	—	—	—	—	—	—	FIMI: 6× Platinum	Obe
"Paraocchi"	2021	3	—	—	—	—	—	—	—	FIMI: 4× Platinum	Blu celeste
"Mi fai impazzire" (with Sfera Ebbasta)	2021	1	—	—	—	—	—	56	—	FIMI: 9× Platinum	Non-album single
"Blu celeste"	2021	1	—	—	—	—	—	—	—	FIMI: 3× Platinum	Blu celeste
"Finché non mi seppelliscono"	2021	3	—	—	—	—	—	—	—	FIMI: 5× Platinum	Blu celeste
"Brividi" (with Mahmood)	2022	1	28	3	11	95	59	1	15	FIMI: 8× Platinum	Non-album singles
"Nostalgia"	2022	2	—	—	—	—	—	—	—	FIMI: 4× Platinum	Non-album singles
"L'isola delle rose"	2023	5	—	—	—	—	—	42	—	FIMI: 2× Platinum	Innamorato
"Un briciolo di allegria" (with Mina)	2023	1	—	—	—	—	—	—	—	FIMI: 5× Platinum	Innamorato
"Bruciasse il cielo"	2023	5	—	—	—	—	—	—	—	FIMI: Platinum	Innamorato (re-release)
"Desnuda"	2024	58	—	—	—	—	—	—	—		Non-album single
"Piangere a 90"	2025	1	—	—	—	—	—	—	—	FIMI: Platinum	Ma'
"Maledetta rabbia"	2025	18	—	—	—	—	—	—	—	FIMI: Gold	Ma'
"Anche a vent'anni si muore"	2026	17	—	—	—	—	—	—	—		Ma'
"Ricordi" (with Elisa)	2026	26	—	—	—	—	—	—	—		Ma'
"Los Angeles"	2026	—	—	—	—	—	—	—	—		Ma'
"Sottogonna"	2026	2	—	—	—	—	—	—	—		Non-album single
"Stelle e galassie"	2026	—	—	—	—	—	—	—	—		Non-album single
"—" denotes a single that did not chart or was not released.

=== As featured artist ===
List of singles as featured artist, with selected chart positions, showing year released and album name
Title	Year	Peak chart positions		Certifications	Album
Title	Year	ITA	SWI	Certifications	Album
"Bon ton" (Drillionaire featuring Lazza, Blanco, Sfera Ebbasta and Michelangelo)	2023	1	87	FIMI: 4× Platinum	10
"Adrenalina" (Baby Gang featuring Blanco and Marracash)	2024	13	—	FIMI: Platinum	L'angelo del male
"Attacchi di panico" (Charlie Charles featuring Blanco)	2025	28	—		La bella confusione

== Guest appearances ==
List of non-single appearances on compilation albums or other artists' albums, with chart positions, album name and certifications
Title	Year	Peak chart positions	Certifications	Album
Title	Year	ITA	Certifications	Album
"Tutti muoiono" (Madame featuring Blanco)	2021	28		Madame
"Dio perdonami" (Blanco & Drast)	2021	48		Red Bull 64 Bars: The Album
"Nemesi" (Marracash featuring Blanco)	2021	4	FIMI: 2× Platinum	Noi, loro, gli altri
"Ogni sbaglio" (Sick Luke & F.T. Kings featuring Blanco and Simba La Rue)	2025	33		Dopamina
"La cura per me" (Giorgia featuring Blanco)	2025	3		G

== Other charted songs ==
List of charting songs that were never released as singles, showing year released and album name
Title	Year	Peak chart positions	Certifications	Album
Title	Year	ITA	Certifications	Album
"Sai cosa c'è"	2021	4	FIMI: Platinum	Blu celeste
"Lucciole"	2021	5	FIMI: 2× Platinum	Blu celeste
"Mezz'ora di sole"	2021	6	FIMI: Platinum	Blu celeste
"Figli di puttana"	2021	8	FIMI: Platinum	Blu celeste
"Pornografia (Bianco paradiso)"	2021	10	FIMI: Platinum	Blu celeste
"Afrodite"	2021	15	FIMI: Platinum	Blu celeste
"David"	2021	19	FIMI: Gold	Blu celeste
"Anima tormentata"	2023	27		Innamorato
"Ancora, ancora, ancora"	2023	33		Innamorato
"Lacrime di piombo"	2023	10	FIMI: Gold	Innamorato
"Innamorato"	2023	16	FIMI: Gold	Innamorato
"Scusa"	2023	32		Innamorato
"Fotocopia"	2023	34		Innamorato
"Giulia"	2023	23		Innamorato
"La mia famiglia"	2023	53		Innamorato
"Raggi del sole"	2023	47		Innamorato
"Vada come vada"	2023	48		Innamorato
"Ti voglio bene, uomo"	2026	92		Ma'
"Peggio del diavolo"	2026	63		Ma'

== Writing credits ==
List of selected songs co-written by Blanco
Title	Year	Artist	Album
"Polvere"	2024	Shiva feat. Tony Boy	Milano Angels
"Se t'innamori muori"	2025	Noemi	Nostalgia
"Lentamente"	2025	Irama	Antologia della vita e della morte
"La cura per me"	2025	Giorgia	G

== Videography ==
Year	Title	Director	Ref.
2020	"Notti in bianco"	Simone Peluso	
2020	"Ladro di fiori"	Simone Peluso	
2021	"La canzone nostra" (with Mace and Salmo)	YouNuts!	
2021	"Paraocchi"	Simone Peluso	
2021	"Mi fai impazzire" (with Sfera Ebbasta)	Andrea Folino	
2021	"Afrodite"	Simone Peluso	
2021	"David"	Simone Peluso	
2021	"Pornografia (Bianco Paradiso)"	Simone Peluso	
2021	"Finché non mi seppelliscono"	Simone Peluso	
2021	"Lucciole"	Simone Peluso	
2021	"Sai cosa c'è"	Simone Peluso	
2021	"Blu celeste"	Simone Peluso	
2021	"Figli di puttana"	Simone Peluso	
2021	"Mezz'ora di sole"	Simone Peluso	
2022	"Brividi" (with Mahmood)	Attilio Cusani	
2022	"Nostalgia"	Simone Peluso	
2023	"L'isola delle rose"	Simone Peluso	
2023	"Un briciolo di allegria"	Simone Peluso	
2023	"Bruciasse il cielo"	Simone Peluso	
2024	"Desnuda"	Simone Peluso	
2025	"Piangere a 90"	Francesco Lorusso	
2025	"Maledetta rabbia"	Francesco Lorusso	
2026	"Anche a vent'anni si muore"	Francesco Lorusso	
2026	"Ricordi"	Francesco Lorusso	
