= Blu celeste Tour =

2022 concert tour by Blanco

- Tour by Blanco
- Location: Italy; Switzerland
- Associated album: Blu celeste
- Start date: 3 April 2022
- End date: 17 September 2022
- Legs: 2
- No. of shows: 35
- Attendance: 300,000

The Blu celeste Tour is the debut tour by Italian singer Blanco, in support of his 2021 studio album Blu celeste. Consisting of two legs and 35 shows, the tour began on 3 April 2022 in Padua and concluded on 17 September 2022 in Milan.

== Development ==
Following the success of his first studio album Blu celeste, Blanco announced the dates for the first leg of the Blu celeste Tour on 21 December 2021. It initially consisted of eight shows, but seven dates were added in Padua, Milan, Rome, Venaria Reale, Florence, Bologna and Brescia after tickets sold out in less than hour on the same day of the tour announcement. After Blanco and Mahmood's win at the Sanremo Music Festival 2022, nineteen new shows were added as part of the second leg of the tour in the summer. Tickets sold out in a few hours, with the tour reaching a total of 300,000 tickets sold.

== Set list ==
This set list is from the concert on 10 April 2022 in Rome. It is not intended to represent all shows from the tour.

1. "Mezz'ora di sole"
2. "Paraocchi"
3. "Figli di puttana"
4. "Sai cosa c'è"
5. "Finché non mi seppelliscono"
6. "Pornografia"
7. "David"
8. "Ladro di fiori"
9. "Belladonna (Adieu)"
10. "Notti in bianco (Acoustic)"
11. "Blu celeste"
12. "Lucciole"
13. "Amatoriale"
14. "Ruggine"
15. "Follia"
16. "Mi fai impazzire"
17. "Afrodite"
18. "La canzone nostra"
19. "Brividi"
20. "Notti in bianco"

== Tour dates ==
List of concerts, showing date, city, venue
Date	City	Venue
Leg 1: clubs in Italy
3 April 2022	Padua	Gran Teatro Geox
4 April 2022	Padua	Gran Teatro Geox
6 April 2022	Milan	Fabrique Milano
7 April 2022	Milan	Fabrique Milano
10 April 2022	Rome	Atlantico
11 April 2022	Rome	Atlantico
13 April 2022	Venaria Reale	Teatro Concordia
14 April 2022	Venaria Reale	Teatro Concordia
4 May 2022	Florence	Teatro Tuscanyhall
5 May 2022	Florence	Teatro Tuscanyhall
19 May 2022	Naples	Casa della Musica
22 May 2022	Bologna	Estragon Club
23 May 2022	Bologna	Estragon Club
27 May 2022	Brescia	Gran Teatro Morato
28 May 2022	Brescia	Gran Teatro Morato
Leg 2: arenas and festivals in Italy
18 June 2022	Locarno	Connection Festival
2 July 2022	Paestum	Clouds Arena
8 July 2022	Ferrara	Ferrara Summer Festival
9 July 2022	Alba	Collisioni Festival
15 July 2022	Codroipo	Villa Manin
17 July 2022	L'Aquila	Pinewood Festival
21 July 2022	Lucca	Lucca Summer Festival
23 July 2022	Servigliano	Nosound Fest
27 July 2022	Rome	Rock in Roma
28 July 2022	Rome	Rock in Roma
30 July 2022	Catania	Villa Bellini
31 July 2022	Catania	Villa Bellini
3 August 2022	Matera	Sonic Park Matera
4 August 2022	Gallipoli	Parco Gondar
6 August 2022	Cattolica	Arena della Regina
12 August 2022	Olbia	Olbia Arena
12 September 2022	Genoa	Goa Boa the Next Day
13 September 2022	Genoa	Goa Boa the Next Day
16 September 2022	Milan	Ippodromo Snai San Siro
17 September 2022	Milan	Ippodromo Snai San Siro
