= List of number-one hits of 2023 (Italy) =

This is a list of the number-one hits of 2023 on Italy's Singles and Albums Charts, ranked by the Federazione Industria Musicale Italiana (FIMI).

== Chart history ==
List of number-one songs and albums
Week	Song	Artist(s)	Ref.	Album	Artist(s)	Ref.
1	"Quevedo: Bzrp Music Sessions, Vol. 52"	Bizarrap and Quevedo		Milano Demons	Shiva	
2	"X caso"	Geolier featuring Sfera Ebbasta		Il coraggio dei bambini	Geolier	
3	"Cookies n' Cream"	Guè, Anna and Sfera Ebbasta		Madreperla	Guè	
4	"Shakira: Bzrp Music Sessions, Vol. 53"	Bizarrap and Shakira		Rush!	Måneskin	
5	"Guasto d'amore"	Bresh and Shune		Madreperla	Guè	
6	"Due vite"	Marco Mengoni		Sirio	Lazza	
7	"Cenere"	Lazza		Sirio	Lazza	
8	"Cenere"	Lazza		Alba	Ultimo	
9	"Cenere"	Lazza		Alba	Ultimo	
10	"Cenere"	Lazza		Alba	Ultimo	
11	"Cenere"	Lazza		Sirio	Lazza	
12	"Cenere"	Lazza		Songs of Surrender	U2	
13	"Cenere"	Lazza		Memento Mori	Depeche Mode	
14	"Cenere"	Lazza		L'amore	Madame	
15	"Il male che mi fai"	Geolier featuring Marracash		Il coraggio dei bambini: atto II	Geolier	
16	"Un briciolo di allegria"	Blanco and Mina		Innamorato	Blanco	
17	"Un briciolo di allegria"	Blanco and Mina		Il coraggio dei bambini: Atto II	Geolier	
18	"Un briciolo di allegria"	Blanco and Mina		Il coraggio dei bambini: Atto II	Geolier	
19	"Un briciolo di allegria"	Blanco and Mina		Il coraggio dei bambini: Atto II	Geolier	
20	"Un briciolo di allegria"	Blanco and Mina		Il coraggio dei bambini: Atto II	Geolier	
21	"On Fire (Paid in Full)"	Emis Killa and Sfera Ebbasta		Effetto notte	Emis Killa	
22	"Mon amour"	Annalisa		Materia (Prisma)	Marco Mengoni	
23	"Hoe"	Tedua featuring Sfera Ebbasta		La Divina Commedia	Tedua	
24	"Hoe"	Tedua featuring Sfera Ebbasta		La Divina Commedia	Tedua	
25	"Hoe"	Tedua featuring Sfera Ebbasta		La Divina Commedia	Tedua	
26	"Bon ton"	Drillionaire, Lazza and Blanco featuring Sfera Ebbasta and Michelangelo		La Divina Commedia	Tedua	
27	"Bon ton"	Drillionaire, Lazza and Blanco featuring Sfera Ebbasta and Michelangelo		La Divina Commedia	Tedua	
28	"Italodisco"	The Kolors		La Divina Commedia	Tedua	
29	"Italodisco"	The Kolors		La Divina Commedia	Tedua	
30	"Italodisco"	The Kolors		La Divina Commedia	Tedua	
31	"Italodisco"	The Kolors		Utopia	Travis Scott	
32	"Italodisco"	The Kolors		Utopia	Travis Scott	
33	"Italodisco"	The Kolors		La Divina Commedia	Tedua	
34	"Italodisco"	The Kolors		La Divina Commedia	Tedua	
35	"Italodisco"	The Kolors		La Divina Commedia	Tedua	
36	"Italodisco"	The Kolors		La Divina Commedia	Tedua	
37	"Italodisco"	The Kolors		Lovebars	Coez and Frah Quintale	
38	"Syrup"	Shiva		Invisibili	Il Tre	
39	"Italodisco"	The Kolors		Dedicato a noi	Ligabue	
40	"Nightmares"	Bresh and Pinguini Tattici Nucleari		E poi siamo finiti nel vortice	Annalisa	
41	"Cadillac"	Boro, Artie 5ive and Andry the Hitmaker		For All the Dogs	Drake	
42	"Everyday"	Takagi & Ketra featuring Shiva, Anna and Geolier		Souvenir	Emma	
43	"Everyday"	Takagi & Ketra featuring Shiva, Anna and Geolier		Relax	Calcutta	
44	"Everyday"	Takagi & Ketra featuring Shiva, Anna and Geolier		1989 (Taylor's Version)	Taylor Swift	
45	"Everyday"	Takagi & Ketra featuring Shiva, Anna and Geolier		Cvlt	Salmo and Noyz Narcos	
46	"Everyday"	Takagi & Ketra featuring Shiva, Anna and Geolier		Cvlt	Salmo and Noyz Narcos	
47	"15 piani"	Sfera Ebbasta and Marracash		X2VR	Sfera Ebbasta	
48	"15 piani"	Sfera Ebbasta and Marracash		X2VR	Sfera Ebbasta	
49	"Moneylove"	Massimo Pericolo featuring Emis Killa		Le cose cambiano	Massimo Pericolo	
50	"Moneylove"	Massimo Pericolo featuring Emis Killa		X2VR	Sfera Ebbasta	
51	"Moneylove"	Massimo Pericolo featuring Emis Killa		QVC 10 – Quello che vi consiglio Vol. 10	Gemitaiz	
52	"All I Want for Christmas Is You"	Mariah Carey		X2VR	Sfera Ebbasta	

== See also ==
- 2023 in music
- List of number-one hits in Italy
