= List of number-one hits of 2024 (Italy) =

This is a list of the number-one hits of 2024 on Italy's Singles and Albums Charts, ranked by the Federazione Industria Musicale Italiana (FIMI).

== Chart history ==
List of number-one songs and albums
Week	Song	Artist(s)	Ref.	Album	Artist(s)	Ref.
1	"Moneylove"	Massimo Pericolo featuring Emis Killa		X2VR	Sfera Ebbasta	
2	"Everyday"	Takagi & Ketra featuring Shiva, Anna and Geolier		Tunnel	Simba La Rue	
3	"Nato per questo"	Club Dogo and Marracash		Club Dogo	Club Dogo	
4	"Nato per questo"	Club Dogo and Marracash		Club Dogo	Club Dogo	
5	"Moon"	Ava featuring Capo Plaza and Tony Boy		Club Dogo	Club Dogo	
6	"I p' me, tu p' te"	Geolier		X2VR	Sfera Ebbasta	
7	"Tuta gold"	Mahmood		Sanremo 2024	Various artists	
8	"Tuta gold"	Mahmood		Nei letti degli altri	Mahmood	
9	"Tuta gold"	Mahmood		Nostalgia (export)	Tony Boy	
10	"100 messaggi"	Lazza		I nomi del diavolo	Kid Yugi	
11	"100 messaggi"	Lazza		Nei letti degli altri	Mahmood	
12	"100 messaggi"	Lazza		Icon	Tony Effe	
13	"L'ultima poesia"	Geolier and Ultimo		Icon	Tony Effe	
14	"Come un tuono"	Rose Villain and Guè		Icon	Tony Effe	
15	"L'ultima poesia"	Geolier and Ultimo		Icon	Tony Effe	
16	"L'ultima poesia"	Geolier and Ultimo		Icon	Tony Effe	
17	"Come un tuono"	Rose Villain and Guè		The Tortured Poets Department	Taylor Swift	
18	"Come un tuono"	Rose Villain and Guè		L'angelo del male	Baby Gang	
19	"Come un tuono"	Rose Villain and Guè		Ferite	Capo Plaza	
20	"Come un tuono"	Rose Villain and Guè		Ferite	Capo Plaza	
21	"Come un tuono"	Rose Villain and Guè		Altrove	Ultimo	
22	"Beatrice"	Tedua featuring Annalisa		La Divina Commedia	Tedua	
23	"Sesso e samba"	Tony Effe and Gaia		Poké melodrama	Angelina Mango	
24	"Sesso e samba"	Tony Effe and Gaia		Dio lo sa	Geolier	
25	"Sesso e samba"	Tony Effe and Gaia		Dio lo sa	Geolier	
26	"Sesso e samba"	Tony Effe and Gaia		Dio lo sa	Geolier	
27	"Sesso e samba"	Tony Effe and Gaia		Vera Baddie	Anna	
28	"Sesso e samba"	Tony Effe and Gaia		Vera Baddie	Anna	
29	"Sesso e samba"	Tony Effe and Gaia		Vera Baddie	Anna	
30	"Sesso e samba"	Tony Effe and Gaia		Vera Baddie	Anna	
31	"Sesso e samba"	Tony Effe and Gaia		Vera Baddie	Anna	
32	"Sesso e samba"	Tony Effe and Gaia		Vera Baddie	Anna	
33	"Sesso e samba"	Tony Effe and Gaia		Vera Baddie	Anna	
34	"Sesso e samba"	Tony Effe and Gaia		Vera Baddie	Anna	
35	"30°C"	Anna		Vera Baddie	Anna	
36	"30°C"	Anna		Dinastia	Co'Sang	
37	"Gotham"	Shiva featuring Kid Yugi		Milano Angels	Shiva	
38	"Zeri in più (Locura)"	Lazza and Laura Pausini		Milano Angels	Shiva	
39	"Fentanyl"	Lazza and Sfera Ebbasta		Locura	Lazza	
40	"Per due come noi"	Olly, Angelina Mango and Juli		Locura	Lazza	
41	"Per due come noi"	Olly, Angelina Mango and Juli		Moon Music	Coldplay	
42	"Per due come noi"	Olly, Angelina Mango and Juli		Containers	Night Skinny	
43	"Per due come noi"	Olly, Angelina Mango and Juli		CalmoCobra	Tananai	
44	"Per due come noi"	Olly, Angelina Mango and Juli		Tutta vita	Olly and Juli	
45	"Per due come noi"	Olly, Angelina Mango and Juli		Tutti i nomi del diavolo	Kid Yugi	
46	"Per due come noi"	Olly, Angelina Mango and Juli		Tutta vita	Olly and Juli	
47	"Islanda"	Pinguini Tattici Nucleari		From Zero	Linkin Park	
48	"Islanda"	Pinguini Tattici Nucleari		Dio lo sa: Atto II	Geolier	
49	"Ora che non ho più te"	Cesare Cremonini		Alaska Baby	Cesare Cremonini	
50	"Islanda"	Pinguini Tattici Nucleari		Hello World	Pinguini Tattici Nucleari	
51	"Gli sbandati hanno perso"	Marracash		È finita la pace	Marracash	
52	"All I Want for Christmas Is You"	Mariah Carey		È finita la pace	Marracash	

== See also ==
- 2024 in music
- List of number-one hits in Italy
