= Ti amo come un pazzo =

Studio album by Mina
- Released: 21 April 2023
- Genre: Pop
- Length: 51:21
- Language: Italian; Neapolitan
- Label: PDU; Pirames International
- Producer: Massimiliano Pani; Michelangelo

Mina chronology
The Beatles Songbook (2022)	Ti amo come un pazzo (2023)	Dilettevoli eccedenze 2 (2023)

Singles from Ti amo come un pazzo
- 1. "Un briciolo di allegria" Released: 14 April 2023

Ti amo come un pazzo is a studio album by Italian singer Mina, released on 21 April 2023, by PDU and Pirames International.

The album consists of 12 tracks for CD and digital format and 10 tracks for the vinyl version. The arrangements were created by Massimiliano Pani, Ugo Bongianni and Franco Serafini. The album was also produced by Pani, with the exception of the track "Un briciolo di allegria", produced by Michelangelo, the author of the track together with Blanco, with whom Mina performs a duet.

Two songs on the album are covers: "Don Salvato'", in Neapolitan, recorded by its author Enzo Avitabile in 2009 for his album Napoletana, and "Tutto quello che un uomo" by Sergio Cammariere, presented at the Sanremo Festival 2003, where it took third place. The album also contains two songs used in films by Ferzan Özpetek: "Buttare l'amore" is the theme of the TV series The Ignorant Angels, and "Povero amore", from the new film Nuovo Olimpo, which will be released by the end of 2023 for Netflix.

== Critical reception ==
Irene Marri from Metropolitan Magazine described the album as "transparent, indelible and authentic", and also stated that Mina once again confirms herself as a pillar of Italian music. According to Gianni Sibilla from Rockol, the result is classic for Mina, with some moments of inevitable déjà vu, or rather déjà écouté. But the goal of the singer and her team has always been to create a sound, image and repertoire beyond time and fashion, even if the tempo is a little audible in the voice, which from time to time she breaks, almost telling about the fragility of love.

== Track listing ==
CD and digital edition
No.	Title	Writer(s)	Length
1.	"Buttare l'amore"	Matteo Mancini; Gianni Bindi	4:18
2.	"Come la luna"	Leonardo Filippo Garilli; Luca Rustici	3:23
3.	"Don Salvato'"	Vincenzo Avitabile	3:30
4.	"Fino a domani"	Federico Spagnoli	4:40
5.	"Zum pa pa"	Alessandro Baldinotti; Paolo Hollesch; Riccardo Del Turco	4:10
6.	"Tutto quello che un uomo"	Roberto Kunstler; Sergio Cammariere	4:26
7.	"L'orto"	Mattia Lezi; Matteo Santarelli	4:28
8.	"Lascia"	Antonio Maio	4:47
9.	"Non ho più bisogno di te"	Viola Serafini; Franco Serafini	4:05
10.	"Un briciolo di allegria" (with Blanco)	Riccardo Fabbriconi; Michele Zocca	4:06
11.	"La gabbia"	Maurizio Morante	4:11
12.	"Povero amore"	Fabrizio Berlincioni; Michele Culotta	5:30
Total length:			51:21

== Personnel ==
- Mina – vocals
- Ugo Bongianni – arrangement, keyboard
- Massimiliano Pani – arrangement
- Franco Serafini – arrangement, keyboard
- Celeste Frigo – audio mixing
- Carmine Di – audio mixing
- Lorenzo Poli – bass
- Gabriele Comeglio – clarinet, baritone saxophone, flute
- Alfredo Golino – drums
- Luca Meneghello – guitar
- Mauro Balletti – photography
- Giuseppe Spada – design

== Charts ==
Chart performance for Ti amo come un pazzo
Chart (2023)	Peak position
Italian Albums (FIMI)	4
Italian Vinyl Albums (FIMI)	1

== Release history ==
Release dates and formats for Ti amo come un pazzo
Region	Date	Format	Label	Ref.
Italy	20 April 2023	CD; vinyl	PDU	
Various	21 April 2023	Digital download; streaming	PDU; Pirames International	
