= Blu celeste =

Blu celeste may refer to:

- Blu celeste (album), a 2021 album by Italian singer Blanco
  - "Blu celeste" (song), the album's title track
- Bleu celeste, a tincture in heraldry
