= Ricordi (Blanco and Elisa song) =

Single by Blanco and Elisa

from the album Ma'
- Language: Italian
- Released: 27 March 2026
- Genre: Pop
- Length: 4:37
- Label: Epic; Universal
- Songwriters: Riccardo Fabbriconi; Michele Zocca; Marco Parisi; Gianpaolo Parisi
- Producers: Michelangelo; A. Parisi

Blanco singles chronology
"Anche a vent'anni si muore" (2026)	"Ricordi" (2026)

Elisa singles chronology
"Sesso debole" (2025)	"Ricordi" (2026)	"Amore è" (2026)

Music video
- "Ricordi" on YouTube

"Ricordi" is a song by Italian singers Blanco and Elisa. It was released on 27 March 2026 through Epic Records and Universal Music Italy as the fourth single from Blanco's third studio album Ma'.

== Background and composition ==
The first time Blanco and Elisa met was in 2022 at the 72nd Sanremo Music Festival, where the two artists competed, placing respectively in first place with "Brividi", a duet with Mahmood, and in second place with the song "O forse sei tu", featured on her album Ritorno al futuro/Back to the Future.

The song was originally written by Blanco in London and Paris between 2024 and 2025. He later reworked the song with Elisa in his recording studio. The track features a musical coda lasting one minute and thirty seconds, featuring the song's melody and a saxophone solo. Blanco explained his decision to collaborate with the singer in a statement posted on his social media accounts:

"Elisa is from the countryside, just like me. I think she’s genuine, intense, but also very down-to-earth and fragile. I admire her for everything she’s accomplished in her incredible career. It’s an honor for me."

The single marks Elisa's fourth release since she announced her recording hiatus in January 2023, with the exception of the solo singles "Dillo solo al buio" (2024) and "Sesso debole" (2025), as well as her second duet with Cesare Cremonini, "Nonostante tutto" released in 2025.

== Critical reception ==
The song received generally favourable reviews from music critics.

Alessandro Alicandri of TV Sorrisi e Canzoni states that this is "a duet that defies the conventions of the duet", as it does not feature the classic dual perspective on the theme of love, but "it is as if Blanco’s thoughts split in two as he thinks of her, imagining her. That is where Elisa’s voice appears [...] in the most intense moments of that thought, of that longing". Alicandri also appreciates the musical coda at the end, where the song's melody blends "with a saxophone that is already heard in the track but which takes centre stage here. The track seems reluctant to stop playing, so much so that it reaches its conclusion by fading out whilst, in the background, the melody continues, just as the song seeks to convey in words".

== Music video ==
The music video, directed by Enea Colombi, was released alongside the song on Blanco's YouTube channel and features Italian actress Carlotta Gamba.

== Charts ==
Chart performance for "Ricordi"
Chart (2026)	Peak position
Italy (FIMI)	26

== Release history ==
Region	Date	Format	Label	Ref.
Italy	March 27, 2026	Radio airplay	Epic	
