= Sottogonna =

2026 song by Blanco

Single by Blanco
- Released: 7 September 2026
- Length: 2:55
- Label: EMI; Universal
- Songwriters: Blanco; Michelangelo
- Producer: Michelangelo

Blanco singles chronology
"Los Angeles" (2026)	"Sottogonna" (2026)	"Stelle e galassie" (2026)

"Sottogonna" (transl. Underskirt) is a song by Italian singer-songwriter Blanco released on 7 September 2026 through EMI and Universal. It was originally recorded by Blanco in 2020 with producer Michelangelo, but remained unreleased for six years. After an unofficial recording circulated online and gained popularity, Blanco eventually released the song on streaming platforms in September 2026, announcing its release stating: "After six years, you have won".

The song peaked at number 2 on the Italian singles chart.

== Charts ==
Weekly chart performance for "Sottogonna"
Chart (2026)	Peak position
Italy (FIMI)	2
