= Bruciasse il cielo =

- Official cover

Single by Blanco

from the album Innamorato
- Released: 10 November 2023
- Length: 3:57
- Label: Island; Universal
- Songwriters: Riccardo Fabbriconi; Davide Petrella; Michele Zocca
- Producer: Michelangelo

Blanco singles chronology
"Bon ton" (2023)	"Bruciasse il cielo" (2023)	"Adrenalina" (2024)

Music video
- "Bruciasse il cielo" on YouTube

"Bruciasse il cielo" is a song by Italian singer-songwriter Blanco. It was released on 10 November 2023 by Island Records and Universal Music as the first single from the digital re-issue of Blanco's second studio album Innamorato.

== Music video ==
The music video for "Bruciasse il cielo", directed by Simone Peluso, was released on the same day via Blanco's YouTube channel.

== Personnel ==
Credits adapted from Tidal.

- Blanco – associated performer, lyricist, composer, vocals
- Davide Petrella – lyricist and composer
- Michelangelo – producer and composer

== Charts ==
Weekly chart performance for "Bruciasse il cielo"
Chart (2023)	Peak position
Italy (FIMI)	5

== Certifications ==
Certifications for "Bruciasse il cielo"
Region	Certification	Certified units/sales
Italy (FIMI)	Platinum	100,000^{‡}
^{‡} Sales+streaming figures based on certification alone.
