= Gassa d'amante =

Studio album by Mina
- Released: 22 November 2024
- Recorded: 2024
- Studio: Studi PDU, Lugano, Switzerland; Officine Meccaniche, Milan, Italy
- Genre: Pop; soft rock; jazz
- Length: 42:12
- Language: Italian
- Label: PDU; Pirames International
- Producer: Massimiliano Pani

Mina chronology
| Dilettevoli eccedenze 2 (2023) | Gassa d'amante (2024) | 1963/1967 (2025) |

Singles from Gassa d'amante
- 1. "Buttalo via" Released: 1 November 2024; 2. "L'amore vero" Released: 10 December 2024; 3. "Senza farmi male" Released: 17 January 2025

Gassa d'amante (transl. 'Bowline', lit. 'Lover's Loop') is a studio album by Italian singer Mina. It was released on 22 November 2024 by her own label, PDU.

== Overview ==
The title of the album refers to the sea knot and symbolizes the strong and at the same time easily untangled nature of love. The album explores the twists and turns of love in all its beauty and complexity.

The album includes ten songs by various authors, including authors who have already worked with Mina, such as Franco Serafini, composer and arranger of Mina since 1985, Mauro Culotta, and Samuele Cerri, as well as new songwriters such as Luca Tudisca. In addition to Francesco Gabbani, the author of the first single, the album contains a song written by singer-songwriter Elisa, who expressed the meaning of the song and Mina's willingness to perform it: "Mina is beyond everything. Always and forever, everybody knows it and I think so too, of course. She has always been for me the most important vocal reference point in Italian music, together with Lucio Battisti, she is the Italian artist I listened to the most as a child and in my teenage years, so she formed me and influenced me a lot. Now a beautiful dream comes true, to hear her sing one of my songs is a gift of life. It gives me a whirlwind of emotions and leaves me with a deep gratitude and a sense of wonder and amazement at how it happened. The somewhat magical and mysterious story of this song makes it all the more unique. That demo of mine has been sitting in its own drawer for 20 years. Only now has it found the light, and she is so immense that she encompasses every age of woman in her voice. I heard in these notes that pure air of a child, that clarity in timbre and transparency in tone that in every moment uncovers the soul."

The song "L'amore vero" was included on the soundtrack of the film Diamanti, directed by Ferzan Özpetek, and became the third collaboration between the singer and the director.

== Promotion ==
In support of the album, the single "Buttalo via" was released on 1 November.

The album will be released simultaneously with the book La voce del silenzio, a collection of essays. Its goal is to trace not only the singer's career, but also her public image, the consequences of her success and her "disappearance", the radical way in which he changed Italian pop music.

== Critical reception ==
Professional ratings
Review scores
| Source | Rating |
|---|---|
| Financial Times | 3/5 stars |
| Newsic.it | 8/10 |
| OndaRock | 7/10 |

Ludovic Hunter-Tilney from Financial Times said: "The music is sumptuously textured and stolidly structured. Mina is the principal attraction. The vigour of her singing is affecting, but so are the times when she sounds her age. Her low timbre, crumbling at the edges, is unmistakably octogenarian at those points. The evidence of the years adds to the sense of momentousness. The world turns, times change — and Mina sings on." The reviewers of The Hollywood Reporter wrote: "Gassa d'amante is a treasure trove of vocal gems. Every song reveals new layers, showcasing not just a singer, but a true artist and assiduous researcher, constantly pushing the boundaries and discovering new ways to express the timeless journey of love." Matteo Vaghi from Newsic.it noted that "Gassa d'amante is not just a record: it is an artistic gesture of rare intensity, a thread that links the past, the present and the future of Italian music." Igor Gavrilov of Kommersant suggested that it is unlikely that Mina will be able to continue releasing new music at the same pace, and not because of the age characteristics of the voice, but the mood of the entire album, in which the image of love as a knot that needs to be untied and go further along the course. "This is what's in the headphones. And in the heart, of course, there is a testament and summing up," the reviewer concluded.

== Track listing ==
Gassa d'amante CD and digital edition
| No. | Title | Writer(s) | Length |
|---|---|---|---|
| 1. | "Non smetto di aspettarti" | Fabio Concato | 5:17 |
| 2. | "Dispersa" | Samuele Cerri; Massimiliano Pani | 4:30 |
| 3. | "Per dirti t'amo" | Roberto Casu | 3:31 |
| 4. | "Amami e basta" | Antonino Luca Tudisca "Lumi" | 3:13 |
| 5. | "Senza farmi male" | Elisa Toffoli | 5:25 |
| 6. | "Il cuore si sbaglia" | Viola Serafini; Franco Serafini | 4:41 |
| 7. | "È cosi che funziona" | Alberto De Martini; Alberto Anelli | 3:23 |
| 8. | "Buttalo via" | Francesco Gabbani | 4:05 |
| 9. | "L'amore vero" | Matteo Mancini; Gianni Bindi | 3:51 |
| 10. | "Non ti lascerò" | Fabrizio Berlincioni; Mauro Culotta | 4:16 |
| Total length: | | | 42:12 |

== Personnel ==
- Mina – vocals, backing vocals (6)
- Massimiliano Pani – arrangement (1–5, 7, 8, 10), backing vocals (1–3, 5–8, 10), production
- Ugo Bongianni – arrangement (1, 3–5, 7, 8, 10), piano (1, 4, 9), programming (2, 3, 7, 8, 10), keyboards (2, 3, 7, 8, 10), mastering, mixing, recording (1, 3–10)
- Alfredo Golino – drums (1–5, 7, 8, 10)
- Lorenzo Poli – bass (1, 3, 7, 10)
- Massimo Moriconi – bass (2, 8)
- Luca Meneghello – guitar (1–5, 7, 8, 10)
- Danilo Rea – piano (2)
- Milena Pani – backing vocals (2, 5, 7, 10)
- Sara Maghelli – backing vocals (2, 5, 7, 10)
- Celeste Frigo – recording (2, 8)
- Faso – bass (5)
- Franco Serafini – arrangement (6), programming (6), keyboards (6), backing vocals (6)
- Gabriele Comeglio – arrangement (9), conducting (9)
- Orchestra Filarmonica Italiana – backing vocals (9)
- Michelangelo Cagnetta – first violin (9)
- Alessia De Filippo – first violin (9)
- Costanza Scavini – first violin (9)
- Francesca Salsi – first violin (9)
- Giacomo Trevisani – first violin (9)
- Eleonora Montagnana – first violin (9)
- Cesare Zafini – first violin (9)
- Margherita Pelanda – first violin (9)
- Irene Forlanelli – first violin (9)
- Martina Ciullo – first violin (9)
- Inesa Baltatescu – first violin (9)
- Mariella Sanvito – first violin (9)
- Gianandrea Guerra – second violin (9)
- Marco Corsini – second violin (9)
- Elisabetta Nicolosi – second violin (9)
- Diego Cerretta – second violin (9)
- Xarja Xhiliola – second violin (9)
- Juliane Reiss – second violin (9)
- Elena Bassi – second violin (9)
- Fabrizio Francia – second violin (9)
- Marina Mainardi – second violin (9)
- Enrico Cacciato – second violin (9)
- Adriana Gallo – second violin (9)
- Catalina Spataru – second violin (9)
- Irina Balta – viola (9)
- Davide Bravo – viola (9)
- Andrea Arcelli – viola (9)
- Valentina Cattaneo – viola (9)
- David Arienti – viola (9)
- Elena Chervyakova – viola (9)
- Claudio Giacomazzi – сello (9)
- Ruta Tamutyte – сello (9)
- Sophie Norbye – сello (9)
- Claudia Stercal – сello (9)
- Andrea Sala – double bass (9)
- Nicola Ziliani – double bass (9)
- Gabriele Comeglio – clarinet (9), flute (9)
- Giuseppe Salvadori – recording (9)
- Filippo Staviero – recording (9)
- Giuseppe Spada – design
- Adriano Merigo – illustrations
- Mauro Balletti – illustrations, photography

Credits are adapted from the album's liner notes.

== Charts ==
Chart performance for Gassa d'amante
| Chart (2024) | Peak position |
|---|---|
| Italian Albums (FIMI) | 3 |
| Italian Physical Albums (FIMI) | 3 |

== Release history ==
Release dates and formats for Gassa d'amante
| Region | Date | Format | Label | Ref. |
|---|---|---|---|---|
| Italy | 22 November 2024 | CD; vinyl; cassette | PDU | |
| Various | 22 November 2024 | Digital download; streaming | PDU; Pirames International | |
