= Panico (song) =

2022 song by Lazza

Single by Lazza featuring Takagi & Ketra

from the album Sirio
- Released: 15 April 2022
- Length: 3:42
- Label: Island
- Songwriters: Jacopo Lazzarini; Davide Petrella; Alessandro Merli; Fabio Clemente
- Producer: Takagi & Ketra

Lazza singles chronology
"Molotov" (2022)	"Panico" (2022)	"Tre di cuori" (2022)

Takagi & Ketra singles chronology
"Shimmy Shimmy" (2021)	"Panico" (2022)	"Bubble" (2022)

Music video
- "Panico" on YouTube

"Panico" is a song co-written and recorded by Italian rapper Lazza. It was released by Island Records on 15 April 2022 as the third single of his third studio album Sirio.

It was written by Lazza with co-writing contribution by Davide Petrella and produced by the duo Takagi & Ketra. The song peaked at number 2 on the Italian singles chart and was certified quintuple platinum in Italy.

== Music video ==
A music video of "Panico", directed by Giulio Rosati, was released on 9 June 2022 via Lazza's YouTube channel.

== Charts ==
=== Weekly charts ===
Weekly chart performance for "Panico"
Chart (2022)	Peak position
Italy (FIMI)	2

=== Year-end charts ===
2022 year-end chart performance for "Panico"
Chart (2022)	Position
Italy (FIMI)	23

2023 year-end chart performance for "Panico"
Chart (2023)	Position
Italy (FIMI)	29

== Certifications ==
Region	Certification	Certified units/sales
Italy (FIMI)	6× Platinum	600,000^{‡}
^{‡} Sales+streaming figures based on certification alone.
