= Maledetta rabbia =

2025 song by Blanco

Single by Blanco

from the album Ma'
- Released: 20 June 2025
- Genre: Pop punk
- Length: 2:35
- Label: EMI; Universal
- Composer: Michelangelo
- Lyricists: Riccardo Fabbriconi; Alessandro Raina; Davide Simonetta
- Producer: Michelangelo

Blanco singles chronology
"Piangere a 90" (2025)	"Maledetta rabbia" (2025)	"Attacchi di panico" (2025)

Music video
- "Maledetta rabbia" on YouTube

"Maledetta rabbia" (transl. Bloody rage) is a song by Italian singer-songwriter Blanco. It was written by the artist together with Alessandro Raina, Davide Simonetta, and Michelangelo, and was released on 20 June 2025 through EMI and Universal as the second single from the third studio album Ma'.

The song peaked at number 18 on the Italian singles chart.

== Music video ==
A music video to accompany the release of "Maledetta rabbia", directed by Francesco Lorusso, was released via YouTube on the same day.

== Charts ==
Weekly chart performance for "Maledetta rabbia"
Chart (2025)	Peak position
Italy (FIMI)	18
Italy Airplay (EarOne)	1

== Certifications ==
Certifications for "Maledetta rabbia"
Region	Certification	Certified units/sales
Italy (FIMI)	Gold	100,000^{‡}
^{‡} Sales+streaming figures based on certification alone.
