= 100 messaggi =

Single by Lazza

from the album Locura
- Released: 27 February 2024
- Length: 4:04
- Label: Island; Universal
- Songwriters: Jacopo Lazzarini; Diego Vincenzo Vettraino; Niccolò Pucciarmati; Guillermo Moreno Romero; Denis Lesjak
- Producers: Lazza; Drillionaire; Miles

Lazza singles chronology
"Amore cane" (2023)	"100 messaggi" (2024)	"BBE" (2024)

Music video
- "100 messaggi" on YouTube

"100 messaggi" (Italian: Cento messaggi, lit. 'One-hundred messages') is a song written and recorded by Italian rapper Lazza. It was released as a single on 27 February 2024 and later added in the rapper's fourth studio album, Locura.

It was written by Lazza, Drillionaire, Miles, Guillermo Moreno Romero and Denis Lesjak, and produced by Lazza, Drillionaire and Miles. The song was performed for the first time during Lazza's appearance as a guest act at the Sanremo Music Festival 2024. It was released by Island Records on 27 February 2024.

The song topped the Italian singles chart and was certified triple platinum in Italy.

== Music video ==
The music video for the song was released on YouTube on 6 March 2024. It was directed by YouNuts! and shot at the Palazzo Arese Borromeo in Cesano Maderno.

== Charts ==
=== Weekly charts ===
Weekly chart performance for "100 messaggi"
Chart (2024)	Peak position
Italy (FIMI)	1
Italy Airplay (EarOne)	8
Switzerland (Schweizer Hitparade)	43

=== Year-end charts ===
Year-end chart performance for "100 messaggi"
Chart	Year	Position
Italy (FIMI)	2024	5
Italy (FIMI)	2025	64

== Certifications ==
Certifications for "100 messaggi"
Region	Certification	Certified units/sales
Italy (FIMI)	3× Platinum	300,000^{‡}
^{‡} Sales+streaming figures based on certification alone.
