= Mina. La voce del silenzio =

- Author: Aa.Vv.
- Language: Italian
- Subject: Mina
- Genre: Essay
- Publisher: Il Saggiatore
- Publication date: 2024
- Publication place: Italy
- Pages: 488
- ISBN: 9791259812803

Professional ratings
Review scores
Source	Rating
Il Messaggero	4/5 stars

Mina. La voce del silenzio (English: Mina. The voice of silence), with the subtitle Presenza e assenza di un'icona pop (English: Presence and absence of a pop icon), is a 2024 collection of essays dedicated to the Italian singer Mina.

== Overview ==
This book takes us on a "journey" through the world of Italian music, television and culture over the last seventy years to better understand who Mina is and the mark she left on each of these fields. The idea of the book is based on the international conference "Mina. La voce del silenzio. Presenza e assenza di un'icona pop" (English: Mina. The voice of silence. The presence and absence of a pop icon), organized at the Faculty of Humanities of the University of Turin in 2021. The conference materials were reworked and expanded by the curators Giulia Maggio, Gabriele Rigola and Jacopo Tomatis, who compiled it, divided into three parts ("Ascoltare Mina," "Guardare Mina," "Immaginare Mina"). The singer Ivano Fossati wrote the foreword.

The book was released on 22 November 2024 by il Saggiatore, simultaneously with the release of Mina's studio album, Gassa d'amante.
