= Dilettevoli eccedenze 2 =

Compilation album by Mina
- Released: 1 December 2023
- Recorded: 1971–2023
- Genre: Pop; jazz
- Length: 35:06
- Language: Italian; English; Neapolitan
- Label: PDU
- Producer: Massimiliano Pani

Mina chronology
Ti amo come un pazzo (2023)	Dilettevoli eccedenze 2 (2023)	Gassa d'amante (2024)

Dilettevoli eccedenze 2 is a compilation album by Italian singer Mina, released by PDU on 1 December 2023.

== Overview ==
As in the previous volume, Dilettevoli eccedenze 2 consists of songs that Mina performed on special occasions or that she recorded and had never released before. The song "Malatia" was released on the 2003 compilation Napoli primo, secondo e terzo estratto, "Il sogno di Giacomo" and a cover version of "Mele Kalikimaka" were included on the 2011 EP Piccola strenna. "Questa e TIM" is an Italian cover version of the song "This Is Me" by Keala Settle from The Greatest Showman, it was used to advertise the TIM telephone company. A cover version of "Can't Take My Eyes Off You" was used in 2003 for a Fiat Panda advertising campaign and latter was released on CD and was included on the 2004 EMI compilation The Platinum Collection. "Fever" was released as a hidden track on the 2005 album Bula Bula, and "La palla è rotonda" has an alternate version on the 2014 album Selfie. "Too Close for Comfort" and the first version of "My Way" have remained unreleased since 1971.

The only new song from the album is "Abban-dono". The official video for the song was released on 6 December 2023. The video was made at the IULM AI Lab, the artificial intelligence laboratory of the IULM University of Milan, by a group of experts who used various modern AI software, including still experimental versions. In the video shot by Eugenio Di Fraia, Mina takes on different ages and different guises, appears in different locations closely related to the visual arts.

== Track listing ==
No.	Title	Writer(s)	Length
1.	"Abban-dono"	Daniele Magro; Saturnino Celani	2:54
2.	"Questa è TIM (This Is Me)"	Benj Pasek; Justin Paul; Maurizio Morante; Luca Josi	3:53
3.	"La palla è rotonda" (Bossa nova version)	Maurizio Catalani; Claudio Sanfilippo	3:48
4.	"Can't Take My Eyes Off You"	Bob Gaudio; Bob Crewe	5:24
5.	"Malatia"	Armando Romeo	3:11
6.	"My Way" (Big Band version)	Gilles Thibault; Claude François; Jacques Revaux; Paul Anka	4:17
7.	"Too Close for Comfort"	Jerry Bock; George David Weiss; Larry Holofcener	3:05
8.	"Fever" (Alternative version)	Eddie Cooley; John Davenport	3:35
9.	"Il sogno di Giacomo"	Massimiliano Pani; Franco Serafini	1:34
10.	"Mele Kalikimaka"	Robert Alex Anderson	3:03
Total length:			35:06

== Personnel ==
- Mina – vocals
- Giuseppe Spada – graphics
- Mauro Balletti – graphics
- Gianni Ronco – image editor
- Celeste Frigo – mastering
- Ugo Bongianni – mastering
- Massimiliano Pani – production

== Charts ==
Chart performance for Dilettevoli eccedenze 2
Chart (2023)	Peak position
Italian Albums (FIMI)	93
Italian Vinyl Albums (FIMI)	18
