= Bubble (Takagi & Ketra song) =

2022 song by Takagi & Ketra

- Official cover

Single by Takagi & Ketra featuring Thasup and Salmo
- Released: 10 June 2022
- Length: 2:44
- Label: Columbia; Sony Music
- Songwriters: Takagi & Ketra; Thasup; Salmo
- Composers: Takagi & Ketra
- Producers: Takagi & Ketra

Takagi & Ketra singles chronology
"Panico" (2022)	"Bubble" (2022)	"Chiagne" (2022)

Thasup singles chronology
"NLFP" (2022)	"Bubble" (2022)	"Siri" (2022)

Salmo singles chronology
"L'angelo caduto" (2022)	"Bubble" (2022)	"Viola" (2022)

Music video
- "Bubble" on YouTube

"Bubble" is a 2022 song by musical duo Takagi & Ketra, with featured vocals by Italian rappers Thasup and Salmo. It was released by Columbia Records on 10 June 2022.

The song peaked at number 10 on the Italian singles chart and was certified double platinum in Italy.

== Music video ==
A music video of "Bubble", directed by Giulio Rosati, was released on 30 June 2022 via the YouTube channel of Takagi & Ketra.

== Track listing ==
Digital download – Standard edition
No.	Title	Length
1.	"Bubble"	2:44

Digital download – The Remixes
No.	Title	Length
1.	"Bubble (Thasup Rmx Acustico)"	2:02
2.	"Bubble (Sick Luke Rmx)"	2:32
3.	"Bubble (Phantasma Rmx)"	2:59
4.	"Bubble (Stabber Rmx)"	3:38
5.	"Bubble (Miles Rmx)"	2:15
6.	"Bubble (Marnik Rmx)"	3:26
7.	"Bubble (Deppu Rmx)"	2:46

== Charts ==
=== Weekly charts ===
Weekly chart performance for "Bubble"
Chart (2022)	Peak position
Italy (FIMI)	10

=== Year-end charts ===
Year-end chart performance for "Bubble"
Chart (2022)	Position
Italy (FIMI)	46

== Certifications ==
Region	Certification	Certified units/sales
Italy (FIMI)	2× Platinum	200,000^{‡}
^{‡} Sales+streaming figures based on certification alone.
