= Chiagne =

2022 song by Geolier

- Official cover

Single by Geolier featuring Lazza and Takagi & Ketra

from the album Il coraggio dei bambini
- Language: Italian; Neapolitan
- Released: 28 October 2022
- Genre: Pop rap
- Length: 2:59
- Label: Columbia
- Songwriters: Emanuele Palumbo; Jacopo Lazzarini; Davide Petrella; Alessandro Merli; Fabio Clemente
- Producers: Takagi & Ketra

Geolier singles chronology
"Cuore" (2022)	"Chiagne" (2022)	"Money" (2022)

Lazza singles chronology
"Caos" (2022)	"Chiagne" (2022)	"Cenere" (2023)

Takagi & Ketra singles chronology
"Bubble" (2022)	"Chiagne" (2022)	"Everyday" (2023)

Music video
- "Chiagne" on YouTube

"Chiagne" is a song by Italian rapper Geolier featuring guest vocals by fellow Italian rapper Lazza and Italian record producers Takagi & Ketra. It was released by Columbia Records on 28 October 2022 as the lead single from Geolier's second studio album Il coraggio dei bambini.

The song peaked at number 2 on the Italian singles chart and was certified quadruple platinum in Italy.

== Music video ==
A visual music video of "Chiagne", directed by Renato Lambo, was released on the same day via Geolier's YouTube channel.

== Charts ==
=== Weekly charts ===
Weekly chart performance for "Chiagne"
Chart (2022)	Peak position
Italy (FIMI)	2

=== Year-end charts ===
Year-end chart performance for "Chiagne"
Chart (2023)	Position
Italy (FIMI)	30

== Certifications ==
Region	Certification	Certified units/sales
Italy (FIMI)	4× Platinum	400,000^{‡}
^{‡} Sales+streaming figures based on certification alone.
