= Caos (Fabri Fibra song) =

Single by Fabri Fibra featuring Lazza and Madame

from the album Caos
- Released: 30 September 2022
- Genre: Alternative hip hop
- Length: 2:59
- Label: Epic
- Composers: Low Kidd; Tego Calderón; Jose Cruz; Paul Irizarry; Don Omar
- Lyricists: Fabrizio Tarducci; Jacopo Lazzarini; Francesca Calearo
- Producer: Low Kidd

Fabri Fibra singles chronology
"Contrabbando" (2022)	"Caos" (2022)	"Universo" (2022)

Lazza singles chronology
"Siri" (2022)	"Caos" (2022)	"Chiagne" (2022)

Madame singles chronology
"Pare" (2022)	"Caos" (2022)	"Il bene nel male" (2023)

"Caos" is a song by Italian rapper Fabri Fibra, with featured vocals by Lazza and Madame. It was released on 30 September 2022 as the third single of Fabri Fibra's studio album with the same name.

== Composition ==
The song's chorus uses the same melody of "Bandoleros" by Puerto Rican reggaeton artist Don Omar featuring Tego Calderón. About the collaboration, Fabri Fibra stated that Lazza raps "in the refrain he manages to express a unique suffering" while Madame "the verse are so different in style but they manage to coexist perfectly".

== Critic reception ==
Claudio Cabona of Rockol consider the song one of the best of the album, writing that it is "an introspective and nostalgic rap bit", in which the artists "try to put the chaos of feelings in order". Alessandro Alicandri of TV Sorrisi e Canzoni considered the song as one of the best of Fabri Fibra career, for its "emotional intensity of the story, which is perhaps one of the most poignant the artist has ever written" because "it is so beautiful that this chaos of feelings, infinitely great and ugly at the same time, can be evoked so vividly in three minutes", defining the production of Low Kidd "masterfully".

== Personnel ==
Credits adapted from Tidal.

- Fabri Fibra – associated performer and lyricist
- Lazza – associated performer and lyricist
- Madame – associated performer and lyricist
- Low Kidd – producer and composer
- Tego Calderón – composer
- Jose Cruz – composer
- Paul Irizarry – composer
- Don Omar – composer

== Music video ==
The music video for "Caos", directed by Cosimo Alemà, was released on 5 October 2022 via Fabri Fibra's YouTube channel.

== Charts ==
Weekly chart performance for "Caos"
Chart (2022)	Peak position
Italy (FIMI)	2
San Marino (SMRRTV Top 50)	21

== Certifications ==
Region	Certification	Certified units/sales
Italy (FIMI)	Platinum	100,000^{‡}
^{‡} Sales+streaming figures based on certification alone.
