= The Beatles Songbook =

Compilation album by Mina
- Released: 18 November 2022
- Recorded: 1965–2022
- Genre: Pop; rock
- Length: 69:43
- Language: English; Italian
- Label: Warner; PDU
- Producer: Massimiliano Pani

Mina chronology
Dilettevoli eccedenze (2022)	The Beatles Songbook (2022)	Ti amo come un pazzo (2023)

Singles from The Beatles Songbook
- 1. "And I Love Her" Released: 21 October 2022

Professional ratings
Review scores
Source	Rating
NewSic	8,5/10
Il Manifesto	5/5 stars
Rockol	7,5/10

The Beatles Songbook is a compilation album by Italian singer Mina, released on 18 November 2022 by Warner Music Italy and PDU. The album features cover versions of songs by The Beatles recorded by Mina in different years.

== Track listing ==
All tracks are written by John Lennon and Paul McCartney except where noted.

No.	Title	Writer(s)	Original album	Length
1.	"Something" (1993 version)	George Harrison	Mina canta i Beatles (1993)	3:43
2.	"Michelle"		Plurale (1976)	5:31
3.	"She's Leaving Home"		Kyrie (1980)	3:29
4.	"Let It Be"		Mina canta i Beatles (1993)	4:03
5.	"And I Love Her"		Previously unreleased	4:22
6.	"With a Little Help from My Friends"		Previously unreleased	3:02
7.	"If I Fell"		Pappa di latte (1995)	2:54
8.	"My Love"	McCartney	Plurale (1976)	4:13
9.	"Yesterday" (Live)		Del mio meglio (1971)	3:20
10.	"Something" (1971 version)	Harrison	Mina (1971)	3:03
11.	"Oh, Darling"		Uiallalla (1989)	3:33
12.	"The Long and Winding Road"		Mina canta i Beatles (1993)	3:51
13.	"Come Together"		Canarino mannaro (1994)	7:42
14.	"So che mi vuoi (It's for You)"	Alberto Testa (Italian lyrics); Lennon; McCartney	Studio Uno (1965)	2:10
15.	"Yesterday"		Mina canta i Beatles (1993)	2:44
16.	"The Fool on the Hill"		Mina canta i Beatles (1993)	3:54
17.	"When I'm 64"		Mina canta i Beatles (1993)	2:44
18.	"Hey Jude"		Catene (1984)	5:25
Total length:				69:43

== Charts ==
Chart performance for The Beatles Songbook
Chart (2022)	Peak position
Italian Albums (FIMI)	9
Italian Vinyl Albums (FIMI)	3

== Release history ==
Release dates and formats for The Beatles Songbook
Region	Date	Format	Label	Ref.
Various	18 November 2022	Digital download; streaming	Warner Music Italy; PDU	
Italy	18 November 2022	CD; vinyl	Warner Music Italy; PDU	
