= Desnuda (Blanco song) =

Single by Blanco
- Released: 21 June 2024
- Length: 2:54
- Label: Island; Universal
- Producer: Michelangelo

Blanco singles chronology
"Adrenalina" (2024)	"Desnuda" (2024)	"Piangere a 90" (2025)

Music video
- "Desnuda" on YouTube

"Desnuda" is a song by Italian recording artist Blanco. It was released on 21 June 2024 by Island and Universal. The song is entirely in Spanish.

== Music video ==
The music video for "Desnuda", directed by Simone Peluso, was released on the same day of the single's release. It was filmed in Medellín, Colombia.

== Charts ==
Weekly chart performance for "Desnuda"
Chart (2025)	Peak position
Italy (FIMI)	58
Italy Airplay (EarOne)	63
