= Zeri in più (Locura) =

Single by Lazza and Laura Pausini

from the album Locura
- Language: Italian
- Released: 13 September 2024
- Genre: Hardcore hip hop
- Length: 4:07
- Label: Island; Universal
- Songwriters: Jacopo Lazzarini; Diego Vincenzo Vettraino; José Luis Perales
- Producer: Drillionaire

Lazza singles chronology
"Exit" (2024)	"Zeri in più (Locura)" (2024)

Laura Pausini singles chronology
"Roma" (2024)	"Zeri in più (Locura)" (2024)	"Se fué" (2024)

Music video
- "Zeri in più (Locura)" on YouTube

"Zeri in più (Locura)" (lit. 'Extra zeros (Madness)') is a song recorded by Italian rapper Lazza and Italian singer Laura Pausini. It was released on 13 September 2024 through Island Records and Universal Music Italia, as the lead single from the rapper fourth studio album Locura.

The song became Lazza's third and Pausini's sixth song to top the Italian Singles Chart; Thanks to the collaboration, Pausini has also occupied the top position on the chart for four consecutive decades.

== Background and description ==
On September 11, 2024, Lazza announced the tracks list of his fourth studio album, including the first single "Zeri in più (Locura)" in collaboration with Laura Pausini. The song was written by Lazza and Drillionaire, with the interpolation of "Una locura" by Spanish singer-songwriter José Luis Perales. The rapper explained the meaning of the song and the willingness to collaborate with Pausini:

"I wanted to say a few words about "Zeri in più". When you have a name as huge as Laura's, it's not easy to approach someone so seemingly distant artistically. I would be the first one to be afraid of being 'soiled'. I want everyone to know that this piece is not a stunt of the majors, nor of anyone but me in the first place, and of Laura who has married my journey from the beginning, also because it is not so obvious that someone would want to sing words that came out of someone else's pen. I am equally aware of how good karma is to me sometimes, but then again, even according to her, we like strange things. I want you all to understand how much weight this piece carries. Thank you Laura, today we have written another piece of history, I am indebted."

Pausini herself explained the decision of collaborate with the rapper:

"When he played me "Zeri in più (Locura)", I was struck by the musical proposal he presented. It was not the classic collaboration that many have offered me and which I did not accept. My vocal part involves me in a style that is not really mine but at the same time Jacopo did not want to distort my voice. He wanted me, for a vocal reason, of course, but also because he knew that I would share his message, his madness that equals his depth. [...] There are many artists I like but very few with whom I would like to record something that stays forever. He is one of them. Because he's modern but then he sits at the piano and plays and sings without anything technological and that's when you realize he's the bomb. Because he is visceral."

== Music video ==
The music video for the song, directed by Late Milk, was released simultaneously with the single on Lazza's YouTube account.

== Commercial performance ==
Zeri in più (Locura) debuted at the top of the Italian Singles Chart, becoming Lazza's third number one song and Pausini's sixth one. Thanks to this, Pausini has occupied the top position on the Italian singles chart in four consecutive decades, the last one was "Limpido" with Kylie Minogue in 2013.

== Charts ==
Chart performance for "Zeri in più (Locura)"
Chart (2024)	Peak position
Italy (FIMI)	1

== Certifications ==
Certifications for "Zeri in più (Locura)"
Region	Certification	Certified units/sales
Italy (FIMI)	Gold	50,000^{‡}
^{‡} Sales+streaming figures based on certification alone.
