= Roma (Luis Fonsi and Laura Pausini song) =

Single by Luis Fonsi and Laura Pausini

from the album El Viaje
- Language: Spanish
- Released: 26 April 2024
- Genre: Pop
- Length: 3:27
- Label: Universal
- Songwriters: El Dandee; Andrés Torres; Luis Fonsi
- Producers: El Dandee; Andrés Torres

Louis Fonsi singles chronology
"Marbella" (2024)	"Roma" (2024)	"Prayer In Your Eyes" (2024)

Laura Pausini singles chronology
"Zero/Cero" (2023)	"Roma" (2024)	"Zeri in più (Locura)" (2024)

Music video
- "Roma" on YouTube

"Roma" is a song by Puerto Rican singer Luis Fonsi and Italian singer Laura Pausini. It was released on 26 April 2024 through Universal Music Latino as the fifth single from Fonsi twelfth studio album El Viaje.

== Background and description ==
During the Laura Pausini World Tour 2023/2024 in promotion of her 2023 album Anime Parallele, Luis Fonsi sang with her the Spanish-language song "Inolvidable" at the Kaseya Center in Miami, Florida, announcing an upcoming collaboration between the two artists. "Roma" marks the first collaboration between the Puerto Rican and the Italian artists in 16 years, after the duet "Todo Vuelve A Empezar" featured on Fonsi's 2008 album Palabras del Silencio.

== Music video ==
The music video for the song was released simultaneously with the single on Fonsi's YouTube account. The video was directed by Carlos Perez at the Miami International Airport.

== Charts ==
Chart (2024)	Peak position
US Latin Pop Airplay (Billboard)	15
