= Siri (Thasup song) =

Single by Thasup featuring Lazza and Sfera Ebbasta

from the album Carattere speciale
- Released: 15 July 2022
- Length: 3:57
- Label: Sony
- Songwriters: Thasup; Lazza; Sfera Ebbasta; Charlie Charles
- Producers: Thasup; Charlie Charles

Thasup singles chronology
"Bubble" (2022)	"Siri" (2022)	"Okkappa" (2022)

Lazza singles chronology
"3 di cuori" (2022)	"Siri" (2022)	"Caos" (2022)

Sfera Ebbasta singles chronology
"Hace calor (Remix)" (2022)	"Siri" (2022)	"Téléphone" (2022)

"Siri" (stylized as s!r!) is a song by Italian recording artist Thasup with featured vocals by rappers Lazza and Sfera Ebbasta. It was released on 15 July 2022 by Sony Music as the second single for Thasup's second studio album Carattere speciale.

The song topped the FIMI singles chart and was certified quintuple platinum in Italy.

== Charts ==
=== Weekly charts ===
Chart performance for "Siri"
Chart (2022)	Peak position
Italy (FIMI)	1
Switzerland (Schweizer Hitparade)	92

=== Year-end charts ===
2022 year-end chart performance for "Siri"
Chart	Position
Italy (FIMI)	18

2023 year-end chart performance for "Siri"
Chart	Position
Italy (FIMI)	83

== Certifications ==
Certification for "Siri"
Region	Certification	Certified units/sales
Italy (FIMI)	5× Platinum	500,000^{‡}
^{‡} Sales+streaming figures based on certification alone.
