= Ma' =

Studio album by Blanco
- Released: 3 April 2026
- Genre: Pop
- Length: 46:09
- Labels: EMI; Universal
- Producers: A. Parisi; Michelangelo; Davide Simonetta; Federico Nardelli; Zazu

Blanco chronology
Innamorato (2023)	Ma' (2026)

Singles from Innamorato
- 1. "Piangere a 90" Released: 9 May 2025; 2. "Maledetta rabbia" Released: 20 June 2025; 3. "Anche a vent'anni si muore" Released: 23 January 2026; 4. "Ricordi" Released: 27 March 2026; 5. "Los Angeles" Released: 10 July 2026

Professional ratings
Review scores
Source	Rating
Ondarock	5/10

Ma' is the third studio album by Italian singer-songwriter Blanco, released on 3 April 2026 by EMI Records and Universal Music Italia.

== Background and composition ==
After the release of his second studio album Innamorato (2023) and the accompanying tour, the singer-songwriter took a year-long break from recording.

The album comprises fifteen tracks written by the singer-songwriter himself in collaboration with songwriters and producers, including A. Parisi, Davide Simonetta, Federico Nardelli, and Zazu. It features two collaborations: with Elisa on the track "Ricordi" and with Gianluca Grignani on "Peggio del diavolo".

== Track listing ==
Ma' – Track listing
No.	Title	Lyrics	Music	Producer(s)	Length
1.	"Ti voglio bene, uomo"	Riccardo Fabbriconi; Michele Zocca	Fabbriconi; Zocca; Davide Grigolo	Michelangelo; Zazu	2:28
2.	"Ma'"	Fabbriconi; Zocca; Davide Simonetta	Fabbriconi; Zocca; Simonetta; Alessandro Raina	Michelangelo	3:35
3.	"Peggio del diavolo" (with Gianluca Grignani)	Fabbriconi; Gianluca Grignani; Zocca	Fabbriconi; Zocca	Michelangelo	3:08
4.	"Tanto non rinasco"	Fabbriconi; Raina; Simonetta	Fabbriconi; Simonetta; Zocca	Michelangelo; Simonetta	2:42
5.	"Ricordi" (with Elisa)	Fabbriconi; Zocca	Fabbriconi; Zocca; Marco Parisi; Giampaolo Parisi	Michelangelo; Parisi	4:37
6.	"Los Angeles"	Fabbriconi; Raina; Simonetta; Zocca	Fabbriconi; Simonetta; Zocca	Michelangelo; Simonetta	3:11
7.	"Anche a vent'anni si muore"	Fabbriconi; Davide Petrella	Simonetta	Michelangelo; Simonetta	3:27
8.	"15 dicembre (prima)"	Fabbriconi; Zocca	Fabbriconi; Zocca	Michelangelo	2:47
9.	"27 luglio (dopo)"	Fabbriconi; Raina; Zocca; Alberto Cotta Ramusino	Fabbriconi; Zocca; Ramusino	Michelangelo	3:46
10.	"Woo"	Fabbriconi; Federico Nardelli	Fabbriconi; Nardelli	Michelangelo; Nardelli	2:09
11.	"Fuochi per aria (la fortuna)"	Fabbriconi; Zocca	Fabbriconi; Zocca; Luca Ghiazzi	Michelangelo	2:29
12.	"Fuori dai denti"	Fabbriconi; Zocca	Fabbriconi; Zocca	Michelangelo	2:48
13.	"Piangere a 90"	Fabbriconi; Ramusino	Zocca	Michelangelo	2:35
14.	"Maledetta rabbia"	Fabbriconi; Raina; Simonetta	Zocca	Michelangelo	2:35
15.	"Un posto migliore"	Fabbriconi	Fabbriconi; Zocca	Michelangelo	3:39
Total length:					46:09

== Charts ==
Chart (2026)	Peak position
Italian Albums (FIMI)	2
Swiss Albums (Schweizer Hitparade)	28

== Certifications ==
Region	Certification	Certified units/sales
Italy (FIMI)	Gold	25,000^{‡}
^{‡} Sales+streaming figures based on certification alone.
