= Buttalo via =

Single by Mina

from the album Gassa d'amante
- Language: Italian
- Released: 1 November 2024
- Genre: Pop
- Length: 4:05
- Label: PDU; Pirames International
- Songwriter: Francesco Gabbani
- Producer: Massimiliano Pani

Mina singles chronology
"Un briciolo di allegria" (2023)	"Buttalo via" (2024)

Music video
- "Buttalo via" on YouTube

"Buttalo via" (English: "Throw It Away") is a song by Italian singer Mina. It was released on 1 November 2024 as the lead single from her studio album Gassa d'amante through PDU and Pirames International.

== Composition ==
The song lyrics and music were written by Francesco Gabbani and produced by Massimiliano Pani. Gabbani explained the meaning of the song and his reaction after Mina selected his work:

"It is an honor for me to have had the opportunity to write the words and music for Throw It Away, the song chosen as the first single from the new record by an extraordinary artist. For me to see this project take shape is an indescribable thrill. I hope this track will touch the hearts of those who listen to it, as it touched mine during its creation. I wholeheartedly thank Mina for believing in me."

== Music video ==
The music video for the song was released on the same day. It was directed by Gianluigi Attorre with the participation of Italian dancer Tommaso Stanzani.

== Critical reception ==
At the ANSA news agency stated that Mina plays with genres and musical styles and continues to remind us to what extent talent and freedom are important for asserting our identity. Andrea Conti of Il Fatto Quotidiano wrote that it is "a perfect song cast in the singer's best chords", in which she sang in the lyrics "a profound reflection [...] on the necessary changes one must face, of letting go of things and people, over the years".

== Personnel ==
- Mina – vocals
- Ugo Bongianni – arrangement, mixing
- Massimiliano Pani – arrangement
