= Anche a vent'anni si muore =

2026 song by Blanco

Single by Blanco

from the album Ma'
- Released: 23 January 2026
- Length: 3:40
- Label: EMI; Universal
- Songwriters: Blanco; Davide Petrella; Davide Simonetta
- Producer: D.whale

Blanco singles chronology
"Attacchi di panico" (2025)	"Anche a vent'anni si muore" (2026)	"Ricordi" (2026)

Music video
- "Anche a vent'anni si muore" on YouTube

"Anche a vent'anni si muore" (transl. Even at twenty you die) is a song by Italian singer-songwriter Blanco. It was written by the artist together with Davide Petrella and producer Davide Simonetta, and was released on 23 January 2026 through EMI and Universal as the third single from the album Ma'.

The song peaked at number 17 on the Italian singles chart.

== Music video ==
A music video to accompany the release of "Anche a vent'anni si muore", directed by Francesco Lorusso, was released via YouTube on 27 January 2026.

== Charts ==
Weekly chart performance for "Anche a vent'anni si muore"
Chart (2026)	Peak position
Italy (FIMI)	17
Italy Airplay (EarOne)	1
