= Nostalgia (Blanco song) =

Single by Blanco
- Released: 3 June 2022
- Genre: Pop punk
- Length: 3:02
- Label: Island
- Songwriters: Riccardo Fabbriconi; Michele Zocca
- Producer: Michelangelo

Blanco singles chronology
"Brividi" (2022)	"Nostalgia" (2022)	"L'isola delle rose" (2023)

Music video
- "Nostalgia" on YouTube

"Nostalgia" is a song by Italian singer-songwriter Blanco. It was released as a single on 3 June 2022 by Island Records. It was written by Blanco and Michelangelo, and produced by Michelangelo.

== Music video ==
The music video for "Nostalgia", directed by Simone Peluso and filmed in New York City, was released on 3 June 2022 via Blanco's YouTube channel.

== Personnel ==
Credits adapted from Tidal.

- Blanco – associated performer, lyricist, composer, vocals
- Michelangelo – producer and composer

== Charts ==
=== Weekly charts ===
Weekly chart performance for "Nostalgia"
Chart (2022)	Peak position
Italy (FIMI)	2
San Marino (SMRRTV Top 50)	17

=== Year-end charts ===
Year-end chart performance for "Nostalgia"
Chart (2022)	Position
Italy (FIMI)	19

== Certifications ==
Certifications for "Nostalgia"
Region	Certification	Certified units/sales
Italy (FIMI)	4× Platinum	400,000^{‡}
^{‡} Sales+streaming figures based on certification alone.
