= Sirio (album) =

Studio album by Lazza
- Released: 8 April 2022
- Genre: Hip hop; trap
- Length: 51:33
- Label: Island; 333Mob
- Producer: Lazza; 808Melo; BigBadBeats; CashMoneyAP; Dardust; Drillionaire; Low Kidd; Miles; Mirko808; PK; Takagi & Ketra

Lazza chronology
Re Mida (2019)	Sirio (2022)	Locura (2024)

Singles from Sirio
- 1. "Ouv3rture" Released: 9 March 2022; 2. "Molotov" Released: 25 March 2022; 3. "Panico" Released: 15 April 2022

Singles from Sirio LP
- 1. "Cenere" Released: 9 February 2023

Sirio is the third studio album by Italian rapper Lazza, released by Island Records on 8 April 2022.

The album includes guest appearances by Tory Lanez, Sfera Ebbasta, Takagi & Ketra, Noyz Narcos, French Montana and Geolier. An LP re-issue of the album including Sanremo entry "Cenere" was released on 17 March 2023.

It peaked at number one on the Italian Albums Chart and was certified diamond, becoming the best-selling album of 2022 in Italy.

== Track listing ==
Sirio – Standard track listing
No.	Title	Lyrics	Music	Producer(s)	Length
1.	"Ouv3rture"	Jacopo Lazzarini	Lorenzo Paolo Spinosa; Frédéric Chopin	Low Kidd	2:52
2.	"Alibi"	Lazzarini	Spinosa; Diego Vincenzo Vettraino; Niccolò Pucciarmati	Low Kidd; Drillionaire; Miles	2:57
3.	"Molotov"	Lazzarini	Spinosa; Vettraino; Pucciarmati; Tuomo Korander; Tommi Vatanen	Low Kidd; Drillionaire; Miles; BigBadBeats	2:40
4.	"Sogni d'oro"	Lazzarini	Lazzarini; Spinosa; Pucciarmati	Lazza; Low Kidd; Miles	2:37
5.	"Bugia" (featuring Tory Lanez)	Lazzarini; Daystar Peterson	Spinosa; Vettraino	Low Kidd; Drillionaire	3:24
6.	"Cinema"	Lazzarini	Lazzarini; Spinosa; Vettraino	Lazza; Drillionaire; Low Kidd	3:21
7.	"Piove" (featuring Sfera Ebbasta)	Lazzarini; Gionata Boschetti	Lazzarini; Spinosa; Vettraino	Lazza; Drillionaire; Low Kidd	2:35
8.	"Panico"	Lazzarini; Davide Petrella	Alessandro Merli; Fabio Clemente	Takagi & Ketra	3:08
9.	"Jefe"	Lazzarini	Spinosa; Vettraino; Pucciarmati; André Loblack	Low Kidd; Drillionaire; Miles; 808Melo	3:15
10.	"Topboy" (featuring Noyz Narcos)	Lazzarini; Emanuele Frasca	Lazzarini; Spinosa	Lazza; Low Kidd	3:26
11.	"Puto" (featuring French Montana)	Lazzarini; Karim Kharbouch	Spinosa; Vettraino	Low Kidd; Drillionaire	2:53
12.	"Senza rumore"	Lazzarini	Lazzarini; Spinosa	Lazza; Low Kidd	3:49
13.	"Nessuno" (featuring Geolier)	Lazzarini; Emanuele Palumbo	Lazzarini; Spinosa; Pucciarmati	Lazza; Low Kidd; Miles	2:28
14.	"3 pali"	Lazzarini	Spinosa; Vettraino; Alex Petit	Low Kidd; Drillionaire; CashMoneyAP	3:12
15.	"Uscito di galera"	Lazzarini	Spinosa; Vettraino; Filippo Gallo	Low Kidd; Drillionaire; PK	2:52
16.	"Nulla di"	Lazzarini	Lazzarini; Spinosa; Vettraino; Mirko Agrestini	Lazza; Drillionaire; Low Kidd; Mirko808	2:58
17.	"Replay"	Lazzarini	Lazzarini; Spinosa; Vettraino	Lazza; Drillionaire; Low Kidd	3:11
Total length:					51:33

Sirio: Concertos – Orchestral version track listing
No.	Title	Length
1.	"Alibi (Concertos)"	3:19
2.	"Molotov (Concertos)"	2:49
3.	"Piove (Concertos)"	2:51
4.	"Panico (Concertos)"	3:06
5.	"Senza rumore (Concertos)"	3:56
6.	"Nessuno (Concertos)"	2:58
7.	"Uscito di galera (Concertos)"	2:41
8.	"Nulla di (Concertos)"	3:07

Sirio – LP reissue bonus track
No.	Title	Lyrics	Music	Producer(s)	Length
1.	"Cenere"	Lazzarini; Petrella	Lazzarini; Petrella; Dario Faini	Dardust	3:28

== Charts ==
=== Weekly charts ===
Weekly chart performance for Sirio
Chart (2022)	Peak position
Italian Albums (FIMI)	1

=== Year-end charts ===
2022 year-end chart performance for Sirio
Chart (2022)	Position
Italian Albums (FIMI)	1

2023 year-end chart performance for Sirio
Chart (2023)	Position
Italian Albums (FIMI)	2

2024 year-end chart performance for Sirio
Chart (2024)	Position
Italian Albums (FIMI)	15

== Certifications ==
Certifications for Sirio
Region	Certification	Certified units/sales
Italy (FIMI)	Diamond	500,000^{‡}
^{‡} Sales+streaming figures based on certification alone.

== Year-end lists ==
Selected year-end rankings of Sirio
Publication	List	Rank	Ref.
Panorama	The 20 Best Italian Albums of 2022	18	
Rolling Stone	The 25 Best Italian Albums of 2022	4	
