= L'isola delle rose =

- Official cover

Single by Blanco

from the album Innamorato
- Released: 27 January 2023
- Length: 3:07
- Label: Island, Universal
- Songwriters: Riccardo Fabbriconi; Michele Zocca
- Producer: Michelangelo

Blanco singles chronology
"Nostalgia" (2022)	"L'isola delle rose" (2023)	"Un briciolo di allegria" (2023)

Music video
- "L'isola delle rose" on YouTube

"L'isola delle rose" is a song by Italian singer-songwriter Blanco. It was released as a single on 27 January 2023 by Island Records and Universal Music as the lead single from his second studio album Innamorato.

== Live performances ==
Blanco first performed the song as a guest during the first night of the Sanremo Music Festival 2023, but in-ear monitoring issues made him unable to hear himself while he was singing. He then proceeded to cause damage to the rose garden set on stage, for which he was booed by the audience at the end of his performance. He later apologized.

== Music video ==
The music video for "L'isola delle rose", directed by Simone Peluso, was released on the same day via Blanco's YouTube channel.

== Personnel ==
Credits adapted from Tidal.

- Blanco – associated performer, lyricist, composer, vocals
- Michelangelo – producer and composer

== Charts ==
=== Weekly charts ===
Weekly chart performance for "L'isola delle rose"
Chart (2023)	Peak position
Italy (FIMI)	5
Switzerland (Schweizer Hitparade)	42

=== Year-end charts ===
Year-end chart performance for "L'isola delle rose"
Chart (2023)	Position
Italy (FIMI)	38

== Certifications ==
Certifications for "L'isola delle rose"
Region	Certification	Certified units/sales
Italy (FIMI)	2× Platinum	200,000^{‡}
^{‡} Sales+streaming figures based on certification alone.
