= Piangere a 90 =

2025 song by Blanco

Single by Blanco

from the album Ma'
- Released: 9 May 2025
- Genre: Ballad
- Length: 2:35
- Label: EMI; Universal
- Composer: Michelangelo
- Lyricists: Riccardo Fabbriconi; Alberto Cotta Ramusino
- Producer: Michelangelo

Blanco singles chronology
"Desnuda" (2024)	"Piangere a 90" (2025)	"Maledetta rabbia" (2025)

Music video
- "Piangere a 90" on YouTube

"Piangere a 90" (Italian: Piangere a novanta, lit. 'Crying at 90 degrees') is a song by Italian singer-songwriter Blanco. It was written by the artist together with Tananai and Michelangelo, and was released on 9 May 2025 through EMI and Universal as the first single from the third studio album Ma'.

The song topped the Italian singles chart.

== Music video ==
A music video to accompany the release of "Piangere a 90", directed by Francesco Lorusso, was released via YouTube on 12 May 2025.

== Charts ==
=== Weekly charts ===
Weekly chart performance for "Piangere a 90"
Chart (2025)	Peak position
Italy (FIMI)	1
Italy Airplay (EarOne)	1

=== Year-end charts ===
Year-end chart performance for "Piangere a 90"
Chart (2025)	Position
Italy (FIMI)	53

== Certifications ==
Certifications for "Piangere a 90"
Region	Certification	Certified units/sales
Italy (FIMI)	Platinum	200,000^{‡}
^{‡} Sales+streaming figures based on certification alone.
