= Cenere (song) =

Single by Lazza

from the album Sirio
- Released: 9 February 2023
- Genre: Hip house
- Length: 3:28
- Label: Island
- Songwriters: Jacopo Lazzarini; Davide Petrella; Dario Faini
- Producer: Dardust

Lazza singles chronology
"Chiagne" (2022)	"Cenere" (2023)	"Zonda" (2023)

Music video
- "Cenere" on YouTube

"Cenere" (lit. 'Ash') is a song co-written and recorded by Italian rapper Lazza. It was released by Island Records on 9 February 2023 and featured on the re-issue of the artist's third studio album Sirio.

The song, written by Lazza, Davide Petrella and Dario Faini, served as the artist's entry for the Sanremo Music Festival 2023, the 73rd edition of Italy's musical festival which doubles also as a selection of the act for the Eurovision Song Contest. He ended up at second place, behind Marco Mengoni.

== Music video ==
The music video for the song was directed by Davide Vicari and released on YouTube on the same day of the single's release.

== Charts ==
=== Weekly charts ===
Weekly chart performance for "Cenere"
Chart (2023)	Peak position
Global 200 (Billboard)	68
Italy (FIMI)	1
Switzerland (Schweizer Hitparade)	5

=== Year-end charts ===
2023 year-end chart performance for "Cenere"
Chart (2023)	Position
Italy (FIMI)	1

2024 year-end chart performance for "Cenere"
Chart (2024)	Position
Italy (FIMI)	39

== Certifications ==
Certifications for "Cenere"
Region	Certification	Certified units/sales
Italy (FIMI)	9× Platinum	900,000^{‡}
^{‡} Sales+streaming figures based on certification alone.
