= Un briciolo di allegria =

Single by Blanco and Mina

from the album Innamorato and Ti amo come un pazzo
- Released: 14 April 2023
- Genre: Pop
- Length: 3:27
- Label: PDU; Pirames International
- Songwriters: Riccardo Fabbriconi; Michele Zocca
- Producer: Michelangelo

Blanco singles chronology
| "L'isola delle rose" (2023) | "Un briciolo di allegria" (2023) | "Bon ton" (2023) |

Mina singles chronology
| "With a Little Help from My Friends" (2022) | "Un briciolo di allegria" (2023) | "Buttalo via" (2024) |

Music video
- "Un briciolo di allegria" on YouTube

"Un briciolo di allegria" is a song by Italian singers Blanco and Mina. It was released as a single on 14 April 2023, by PDU and Pirames International, along with its music video. It was included on both Blanco's second studio album Innamorato and Mina's seventy-fifth album Ti amo come un pazzo.

== Music video ==
A music video, directed by Simone Peluso, was released along with the single on 14 April 2023. The music video was shot in black and white and stylized as old Hollywood movies. According to the plot, Blanco can not catch up with Mina, who is constantly hiding in various locations of the old mansion.

== Critical reception ==
Claudio Cabona from Rockol described the song as a dialogue between generations, musically linear and enjoyable, with a singer who enters Blanco's world using fresh language. Cabona also called this collaboration one of Mina's most memorable. Fabio Fiume from All Music Italia wrote that "Blanco sing behind the lady of Italian music, without disfiguring, renouncing, except for the start, the protection of the fashionable effect in the meeting of voices and telling a story to be written in pencil, after being crumpled by life". He also noted that "the incipit of the recorded melodically makes so much Mina / Celentano, and then slide towards a hypnotic pappa pappa that it is impossible not to remember".

== Charts ==
=== Weekly charts ===
Weekly chart performance for "Un briciolo di allegria"
| Chart (2023) | Peak position |
|---|---|
| Italy (FIMI) | 1 |

=== Year-end charts ===
Year-end chart performance for "Un briciolo di allegria"
| Chart (2023) | Position |
|---|---|
| Italy (FIMI) | 11 |

== Certifications ans sales ==
Certifications for "Un briciolo di allegria"
| Region | Certification | Certified units/sales |
|---|---|---|
| Italy (FIMI) | 5× Platinum | 500,000^{‡} |
^{‡} Sales+streaming figures based on certification alone.
