= Innamorato (Blanco album) =

Studio album by Blanco
- Released: 14 April 2023
- Genre: Pop rap; pop punk
- Length: 35:53
- Label: Island
- Producer: Michelangelo

Blanco chronology
Blu celeste (2021)	Innamorato (2023)	Ma' (2026)

Singles from Innamorato
- 1. "L'isola delle rose" Released: 27 January 2023; 2. "Un briciolo di allegria" Released: 14 April 2023; 3. "Bruciasse il cielo" Released: 10 November 2023

Professional ratings
Review scores
Source	Rating
Ondarock	6/10

Innamorato (transl. In love) is the second studio album by Italian singer-songwriter Blanco. The album was produced by Michelangelo and released on 14 April 2023 by Island Records.

The album peaked at number 1 of FIMI's album chart and was certified double platinum in Italy.

== Track listing ==
All tracks are written by Riccardo Fabbriconi and Michele Zocca, except where noted; all tracks are produced by Michelangelo.

Innamorato standard edition
No.	Title	Length
1.	"Anima tormentata"	2:56
2.	"Ancora, ancora, ancora" (writers: Fabbriconi, Davide Simonetta, Zocca)	2:45
3.	"Un briciolo di allegria" (with Mina)	3:27
4.	"Lacrime di piombo"	3:16
5.	"L'isola delle rose"	3:07
6.	"Innamorato"	2:36
7.	"Scusa"	2:55
8.	"Fotocopia"	3:22
9.	"Giulia"	3:13
10.	"La mia famiglia"	2:17
11.	"Raggi del sole"	3:11
12.	"Vada come vada"	2:48
Total length:		33:33

Innamorato digital re-issue
No.	Title	Length
13.	"Bruciasse il cielo" (writers: Fabbriconi, Davide Petrella, Zocca)	3:57

== Charts ==
=== Weekly charts ===
Weekly chart performance for Innamorato
Chart (2023)	Peak position
Italian Albums (FIMI)	1
Swiss Albums (Schweizer Hitparade)	6

=== Year-end charts ===
2023 year-end chart performance for Innamorato
Chart (2023)	Position
Italian Albums (FIMI)	12

== Certifications ==
Certifications for Innamorato
Region	Certification	Certified units/sales
Italy (FIMI)	2× Platinum	100,000^{‡}
^{‡} Sales+streaming figures based on certification alone.
