= La canzone nostra =

2021 single by Mace, Blanco and Salmo

Single by Mace, Blanco and Salmo

from the album OBE
- Released: 8 January 2021
- Genre: Electro hop
- Length: 3:57
- Label: Island
- Composers: Simone Benussi; Andrea Venerus
- Lyricists: Riccardo Fabbriconi; Maurizio Pisciottu
- Producer: Mace

Mace singles chronology
"Ragazzi della nebbia" (2020)	"La canzone nostra" (2021)	"Ogni pensiero vola" (2021)

Blanco singles chronology
"Ladro di fiori" (2020)	"La canzone nostra" (2021)	"Paraocchi" (2021)

Salmo singles chronology
"Sballo shallo" (2020)	"La canzone nostra" (2021)	"Kumite" (2021)

Music video
- "La canzone nostra" on YouTube

"La canzone nostra" (transl. "Our song") is a song by Italian record producer Mace, Italian singer-songwriter Blanco and Italian rapper Salmo. It was released through Island on 8 January 2021 as the second single from Mace's debut studio album OBE.

The song peaked at number 1 on the FIMI single chart for seven weeks and ranked fifth in the 2021 year-end single chart. "La canzone nostra" was certified sextuple platinum in Italy.

== Music video ==
The music video for "La canzone nostra", directed by YouNuts!, was released on 11 January 2022 via Mace's YouTube channel. As of 10 February 2022, the video has over 40 million views on YouTube.

== Personnel ==
Credits adapted from Tidal.

- Mace – producer, composer, drum machine
- Venerus – composer
- Blanco – associated performer, author, vocals
- Salmo – associated performer, author, vocals

== Charts ==
=== Weekly charts ===
Chart performance for "La canzone nostra"
Chart (2021)	Peak position
Italy (FIMI)	1
San Marino (SMRRTV Top 50)	28

=== Year-end charts ===
2021 year-end chart performance for "La canzone nostra"
Chart (2021)	Position
Italy (FIMI)	5

2022 year-end chart performance for "La canzone nostra"
Chart (2022)	Position
Italy (FIMI)	72

== Certifications ==
Region	Certification	Certified units/sales
Italy (FIMI)	6× Platinum	600,000^{‡}
^{‡} Sales+streaming figures based on certification alone.
