= Notti in bianco =

Single by Blanco

from the album Blu celeste
- Released: 23 July 2020
- Genre: Rock and roll
- Length: 2:56
- Label: Island; Universal
- Songwriters: Riccardo Fabbriconi; Michele Zocca; Davide Simonetta
- Producer: Michelangelo

Blanco singles chronology
"Belladonna (Adieu)" (2020)	"Notti in bianco" (2020)	"Ladro di fiori" (2020)

Music video
- "Notti in bianco" on YouTube

"Notti in bianco" (transl. Sleepless nights) is a song co-written and recorded by Italian singer Blanco. It was released on 23 July 2020 through Island Records and Universal Music as the lead single from his debut studio album Blu celeste.

The song, written by Blanco with co-writing contribution by Davide Simonetta and Michele Zocca, was produced by the latter. It peaked at number 2 on the FIMI single chart and ranked sixth in the 2021 year-end single chart. It was certified sextuple platinum in Italy.

== Music video ==
The music video for "Notti in bianco", directed by Simone Peluso, premiered on 30 July 2020 via Blanco's YouTube channel. As of 15 February 2022, the video has over 40 million views on YouTube.

== Personnel ==
Credits adapted from Tidal.

- Blanco – associated performer, author, vocals
- Michelangelo – producer, composer
- Davide Simonetta – composer

== Charts ==
=== Weekly charts ===
Weekly chart performance for "Notti in bianco"
Chart (2021)	Peak position
Italy (FIMI)	2

=== Year-end charts ===
2021 year-end chart performance for "Notti in bianco"
Chart (2021)	Position
Italy (FIMI)	6

2022 year-end chart performance for "Notti in bianco"
Chart (2022)	Position
Italy (FIMI)	22

== Certifications ==
Region	Certification	Certified units/sales
Italy (FIMI)	6× Platinum	600,000^{‡}
^{‡} Sales+streaming figures based on certification alone.
