= Ladro di fiori =

Single by Blanco

from the album Blu celeste
- Released: 20 October 2020
- Length: 3:08
- Label: Island
- Songwriters: Riccardo Fabbriconi; Michele Zocca
- Producer: Michelangelo

Blanco singles chronology
"Notti in bianco" (2020)	"Ladro di fiori" (2020)	"La canzone nostra" (2021)

Music video
- "Ladro di fiori" on YouTube

"Ladro di fiori" (transl. Flower thief) is a song written and recorded by Italian singer Blanco. It was released on 20 October 2020 through Island Records as the second single from his debut studio album Blu celeste.

It was written by Blanco and Michelangelo, and produced by the latter. The song peaked at number 16 on the FIMI singles chart and was certified double platinum in Italy.

== Music video ==
The music video for "Ladro di fiori", directed by Simone Peluso, was released on 20 October 2020 via Blanco's YouTube channel. As of 15 February 2022, the video has over 12 million views on YouTube.

== Personnel ==
Credits adapted from Tidal.

- Michelangelo – producer and composer
- Blanco – associated performer, author, vocals

== Charts ==
=== Weekly charts ===
Weekly chart performance of "Ladro di fiori"
Chart (2021)	Peak position
Italy (FIMI)	16

=== Year-end charts ===
Year-end chart performance for "Ladro di fiori"
Chart (2021)	Position
Italy (FIMI)	86

== Certifications ==
Region	Certification	Certified units/sales
Italy (FIMI)	2× Platinum	200,000^{‡}
^{‡} Sales+streaming figures based on certification alone.
