= Mi fai impazzire =

Single by Blanco and Sfera Ebbasta
- Released: 18 June 2021
- Genre: Pop punk
- Length: 3:40
- Label: Island; Universal
- Composers: Gregory Taurone; Michele Zocca
- Lyricists: Riccardo Fabbriconi; Gionata Boschetti
- Producers: Greg Willen; Michelangelo

Blanco singles chronology
"Paraocchi" (2021)	"Mi fai impazzire" (2021)	"Blu celeste" (2021)

Sfera Ebbasta singles chronology
"Di notte" (2021)	"Mi fai impazzire" (2021)	"Tu mi hai capito" (2021)

Music video
- "Mi fai impazzire" on YouTube

"Mi fai impazzire" (pronounced [mi ˈfai impatˈtsiːre]; lit. 'You drive me crazy') is a song by Italian singer Blanco and Italian rapper Sfera Ebbasta. It was produced by Greg Willen and Michelangelo, and released on 18 June 2021 through Island Records and Universal Music.

The song peaked at number 1 on the FIMI single chart for eight weeks and was certified nine times platinum in Italy.

== Music video ==
The music video for "Mi fai impazzire", directed by Andrea Folino, premiered on 7 July 2021 via Blanco's YouTube channel.

== Charts ==
=== Weekly charts ===
Weekly chart performance for "Mi fai impazzire"
Chart (2021)	Peak position
Italy (FIMI)	1
San Marino (SMRRTV Top 50)	6
Switzerland (Schweizer Hitparade)	56

=== Year-end charts ===
2021 year-end chart performance for "Mi fai impazzire"
Chart (2021)	Position
Italy (FIMI)	2

2022 year-end chart performance for "Mi fai impazzire"
Chart (2022)	Position
Italy (FIMI)	20

== Certifications ==
Region	Certification	Certified units/sales
Italy (FIMI)	9× Platinum	900,000^{‡}
^{‡} Sales+streaming figures based on certification alone.
