= Paraocchi =

Single by Blanco

from the album Blu celeste
- Released: 25 February 2021
- Genre: Pop punk; punk rock
- Length: 2:36
- Label: Island
- Songwriters: Riccardo Fabbriconi; Davide Simonetta; Michele Zocca
- Producers: Michelangelo; d.whale

Blanco singles chronology
"La canzone nostra" (2021)	"Paraocchi" (2021)	"Mi fai impazzire" (2021)

Music video
- "Paraocchi" on YouTube

"Paraocchi" (transl. Blinders) is a song co-written and recorded by Italian singer Blanco. It was released on 25 February 2021 through Island Records as the third single from his debut studio album Blu celeste.

The song was written by Blanco, Michelangelo and Davide Simonetta, and produced by Michelangelo and Simonetta.

The song peaked at number 3 on the FIMI single chart and was certified quadruple platinum in Italy.

== Music video ==
The music video for "Paraocchi", directed by Simone Peluso and filmed in Hungary, was released on 26 February 2021 via Blanco's YouTube channel. As of 29 July 2024, the video has over 28 million views on YouTube.

== Personnel ==
Credits adapted from Tidal.

- Blanco – associated performer, lyricist, vocals
- Michelangelo – producer and composer
- Davide Simonetta – producer and composer

== Charts ==
=== Weekly charts ===
Weekly chart performance of "Paraocchi"
Chart (2021)	Peak position
Italy (FIMI)	3

=== Year-end charts ===
2021 year-end chart performance for "Paraocchi"
Chart (2021)	Position
Italy (FIMI)	15

2022 year-end chart performance for "Paraocchi"
Chart (2022)	Position
Italy (FIMI)	77

== Certifications ==
Region	Certification	Certified units/sales
Italy (FIMI)	4× Platinum	400,000^{‡}
^{‡} Sales+streaming figures based on certification alone.
