= Finché non mi seppelliscono =

Single by Blanco

from the album Blu celeste
- Released: 12 November 2021
- Genre: Punk rock
- Length: 2:48
- Label: Island
- Songwriters: Riccardo Fabbriconi; Michele Zocca
- Producer: Michelangelo

Blanco singles chronology
"Blu celeste" (2021)	"Finché non mi seppelliscono" (2021)	"Brividi" (2022)

Music video
- "Finché non mi seppelliscono" (Visual) on YouTube

"Finché non mi seppelliscono" (transl. Until they bury me) is a song written and recorded by Italian singer Blanco. It was released on 12 November 2021 through Island Records as the fifth single from his debut studio album Blu celeste.

The song was written by Blanco and Michelangelo, and produced by the latter. The song peaked at number 3 on the FIMI single chart and was certified double platinum in Italy.

== Personnel ==
Credits adapted from Tidal.

- Michelangelo – producer, composer
- Blanco – associated performer, author, vocals

== Charts ==
=== Weekly charts ===
Weekly chart performance for "Finché non mi seppelliscono"
Chart (2021)	Peak position
Italy (FIMI)	3
San Marino (SMRRTV Top 50)	30

=== Year-end charts ===
2021 year-end chart performance
Chart (2021)	Position
Italy (FIMI)	87

2022 year-end chart performance
Chart (2022)	Position
Italy (FIMI)	11

== Certifications ==
Region	Certification	Certified units/sales
Italy (FIMI)	5× Platinum	500,000^{‡}
^{‡} Sales+streaming figures based on certification alone.
