= Bon ton (song) =

2023 song by Drillionaire

Single by Drillionaire featuring Lazza, Blanco, Sfera Ebbasta and Michelangelo

from the album 10
- Released: 23 June 2023
- Length: 3:58
- Label: Island; Universal
- Songwriters: Diego Vincenzo Vettraino; Jacopo Lazzarini; Riccardo Fabbriconi; Gionata Boschetti; Edwyn Roberts; Michele Zocca
- Producers: Drillionaire; Michelangelo

Lazza singles chronology
"Zonda" (2023)	"Bon ton" (2023)	"Amore cane" (2023)

Blanco singles chronology
"Un briciolo di allegria" (2023)	"Bon ton" (2023)	"Bruciasse il cielo" (2023)

Sfera Ebbasta singles chronology
"Capitán" (2023)	"Bon ton" (2023)	"Milano" (2023)

Music video
- "Bon ton" on YouTube

"Bon ton" is a 2023 song by Italian music producer Drillionaire, with featured vocals by Lazza, Blanco and Sfera Ebbasta, and co-produced by Michelangelo. It was released on 23 June 2023 as Drillionaire's lead single from his debut studio album 10.

The song peaked at number 1 on the Italian singles chart and was certified quintuple platinum in Italy.

== Music video ==
A visual music video of "Bon ton", directed by Davide Vicari, was released on 23 June 2023 via Drillionaire's YouTube channel.

== Charts ==
=== Weekly charts ===
Weekly chart performance for "Bon ton"
Chart (2023)	Peak position
Italy (FIMI)	1
Switzerland (Schweizer Hitparade)	87

=== Year-end charts ===
2023 year-end chart performance for "Bon ton"
Chart (2023)	Position
Italy (FIMI)	13

2024 year-end chart performance for "Bon ton"
Chart (2024)	Position
Italy (FIMI)	55

== Certifications ==
Certifications for "Bon ton"
Region	Certification	Certified units/sales
Italy (FIMI)	5× Platinum	500,000^{‡}
^{‡} Sales+streaming figures based on certification alone.
