= Brividi =

2022 single by Mahmood and Blanco

Single by Mahmood and Blanco
- Released: 2 February 2022
- Genre: R&B
- Length: 3:19 (original version); 2:55 (Eurovision version)
- Label: Island; Universal Music
- Composers: Michele Zocca; Alessandro Mahmoud; Riccardo Fabbriconi
- Lyricists: Alessandro Mahmoud; Riccardo Fabbriconi
- Producer: Michelangelo

Mahmood singles chronology
"Rubini" (2021)	"Brividi" (2022)	"Bel Air" (2022)

Blanco singles chronology
"Finché non mi seppelliscono" (2021)	"Brividi" (2022)	"Nostalgia" (2022)

Music video
- "Brividi" on YouTube

Eurovision Song Contest 2022 entry
- Country: Italy
- Artists: Mahmood and Blanco
- Language: Italian
- Composers: Alessandro Mahmoud; Michele "Michelangelo" Zocca; Riccardo Fabbriconi
- Lyricists: Alessandro Mahmoud; Riccardo Fabbriconi

Finals performance
- Final result: 6th
- Final points: 268

Entry chronology
- ◄ "Zitti e buoni" (2021)
- "Due vite" (2023) ►

"Brividi" (Italian pronunciation: [ˈbriːvidi]; transl. "Shivers") is a song written and recorded by Italian singer-songwriters Mahmood and Blanco, released by Island Records and Universal Music on 2 February 2022. It was the winning song of the Italian Sanremo Music Festival 2022 and Italy's entry at that year's Eurovision Song Contest.

"Brividi" broke the record for the most streams in one day on Spotify in Italy. It topped the Italian and the Swiss official singles charts. It reached the top ten in Iceland, Lithuania and Israel, charted in eight other territories, and has since been certified eight times platinum in Italy.

== Music video ==
The music video for "Brividi", directed by Attilio Cusani, was shot in different locations in the Netherlands: the village of Burgerbrug, a neighbourhood in Aalsmeer, the beach of Camperduin, Amsterdam Oost, Amsterdam Nieuw-West, and in the concert hall Musis in Arnhem and released on 2 February 2022 via Mahmood's YouTube channel. As of October 2024, the YouTube video has over 82 million views.

== Eurovision Song Contest ==
"Brividi" was released by Island Records and Universal Music on 2 February 2022 and was performed by Mahmood and Blanco at the Sanremo Music Festival 2022, the 72nd edition of Italy's annual national music event which doubled as offering the winner to act as the Italian entry for the Eurovision Song Contest 2022. "Brividi" ultimately won the competition, and the performers accepted to participate at the contest in Turin.

Italy automatically qualified to the final of the contest, which included two semi finals, as the host nation and a member of the "Big Five", the contest's main sponsoring countries. In the final, held on 14 May 2022, "Brividi" was drawn to perform as the 9th entry out of 25, and placed 6th overall with 268 points, based on 7th place rank from juries and 8th from the public.

== Personnel ==
Credits adapted from Tidal.

- Michelangelo – producer, composer
- Mahmood – associated performer, author, vocals
- Blanco – associated performer, author, vocals

== Charts ==
=== Weekly charts ===
Weekly chart performance for "Brividi"
Chart (2022)	Peak position
Croatia (HRT)	21
Euro Digital Song Sales (Billboard)	1
Global 200 (Billboard)	15
Greece International (IFPI)	28
Iceland (Tónlistinn)	8
Israel International Airplay (Media Forest)	4
Italy (FIMI)	1
Lithuania (AGATA)	3
Luxembourg Songs (Billboard)	11
Netherlands (Single Tip)	2
Portugal (AFP)	170
San Marino Airplay (SMRTV Top 50)	2
Spain (PROMUSICAE)	95
Sweden (Sverigetopplistan)	59
Switzerland (Schweizer Hitparade)	1
UK Singles Downloads (Official Charts)	65

=== Year-end charts ===
2022 year-end chart performance for "Brividi"
Chart (2022)	Position
Italy (FIMI)	1
Lithuania (AGATA)	85
Switzerland (Schweizer Hitparade)	79

== Certifications ==
Certifications for "Brividi"
Region	Certification	Certified units/sales
Italy (FIMI)	8× Platinum	800,000^{‡}
^{‡} Sales+streaming figures based on certification alone.
