= Lazza =

Italian rapper and record producer

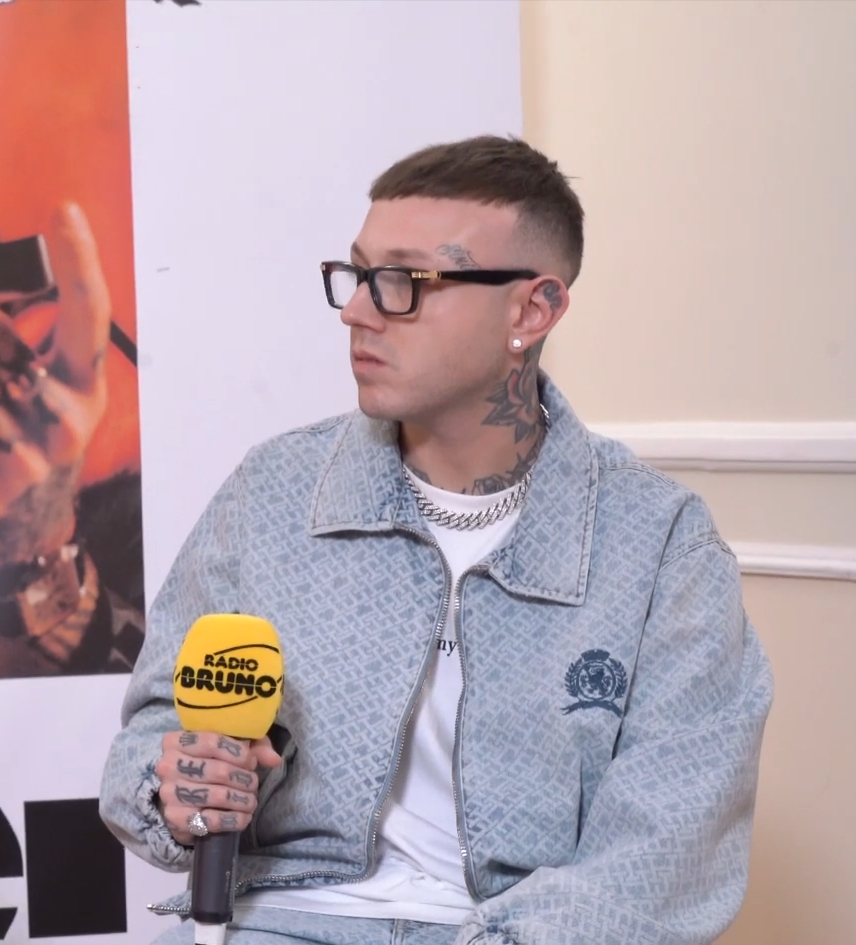

Background information
- Born: Jacopo Lazzarini; 22 August 1994 (age 32); Milan, Lombardy, Italy
- Genres: Hip hop; pop rap; trap
- Occupations: Rapper; record producer
- Instruments: Vocals; piano
- Years active: 2012–present
- Labels: 333Mob; Universal Music

Jacopo Lazzarini (born 22 August 1994), known professionally as Lazza, is an Italian rapper and record producer.

== Early life ==
Lazzarini was born in Milan, more precisely in the Calvairate district which is in zone 4 of Milan. From a young age, he cultivated a passion for music, which led him to study piano at the Giuseppe Verdi Conservatory in Milan. He later changed his major, transferring to a linguistic high school but he did not pass the associated Maturity Exam. He subsequently moved into the world of hip-hop, joining the collectives On The Grind Crew, Zero2 and Blocco Recordz. In 2009, he took part in the annual freestyle event Tecniche Perfette.

== Career ==
=== 2012-2016: Early career ===
On 5 November 2012, his recording debut took place with the release of the mixtape Destiny Mixtape, distributed for free; the song "Putas" features the participation of Giaime. On 29 December 2014, his second mixtape K1 Mixtape was released. It was made with the production of DJ Telaviv of Blocco Recordz. This release also saw the participation of the rapper Emis Killa in the song "#NSSAUC". Their collaboration was renewed the following year with the songs "B.Rex Bestie" and "Bella idea", featured in Keta Music Vol. 2.

In 2016, Lazza took part in the hip hop radio show Real Talk Radio. On December 12 and December 30 of the same year, he released the singles "DDA" and "Super Santos Freestyle", both available digitally.

=== 2017-2018: Zzala ===
On 20 Match 2017, Lazza announced his debut album Zzala, which was released on April 14. Compared to previous mixtapes, the album is characterized by the intersection between trap sounds and the use of the piano inspired by classical music. Among its eleven tracks, it includes "MOB", made in collaboration with Nitro and Salmo. The album was promoted in the summer of 2017 through two tours, the Zzala tour and the Zzala Winter tour.

In the following months, he dedicated himself to producing tracks for Ernia (such as the track "Disgusting") and Nitro (with "Passepartout"). Fabri Fibra was featured in his song "Lario RMX". Furthermore, Zzala was certified gold alongside the tracks "DDA" and "MOB", while the song "Lario" was certified platinum.

=== 2018-2020: Re Mida and J ===
In July 2018, Lazza released the single "Porto Cervo" in collaboration with Dokim. The single was later certified platinum. Preceded by the singles "Gucci Ski Mask" (which was a collaboration with Guè) and "Netflix" on 1 March 2019, Lazza's second studio album Re Mida was released. The album includes collaborations with Tedua, Izi, Fabri Fibra, Luchè, Giaime and Kaydy Cain.

The album represents a further evolution of Lazza's musical style, which almost entirely embraces trap music. The album, produced by 333 Mob and Universal Music, debuted at number one on the FIMI Album Chart. On October 3, Lazza released Re Mida (Aurum), a reissue of his original album that now includes a bonus track, and he also released the EP Re Mida (Piano Solo); the latter contains some songs from the original album rearranged for piano and voice only. The albums were preceded by the release of the single "Ouver2re".

On 6 July 2020, he announced the release of the mixtape J, released on July 17. The album consists of ten tracks in collaboration with artists such as Capo Plaza, Thasup, Pyrex and Tony Effe (then part of the collective Dark Polo Gang), Guè, Shiva, Rondodasosa, Geolier and Gemitaiz. In the same year, he was featured in three tracks in the mixtape Bloody Vinyl 3 by DJ producer Slait, Low Kidd, Young Miles and Thasup.

=== 2022-2023: Sirio and the 2023 Sanremo Music Festival ===
Lazza officially released the album Sirio in 8 April 2022. Produced largely by Low Kidd, Drillionaire, and Young Miles, it contains seventeen tracks in collaboration with Italian and international rappers such as Tory Lanez, French Montana, Geolier, Sfera Ebbasta, Noyz Narcos and Dokim. It was preceded by the singles "Ouv3rture" and "Molotov", released on March 10 and 25 respectively. The album debuted at number one on the FIMI Album chart and, in the same week, the seventh track "Piove" (in collaboration with Sfera Ebbasta) reached the top of the Top Singles chart.

Over the next two years, Sirio was certified diamond: it is the first Italian rap album to ever achieve this. It is also the third album to have remained at the top of the FIMI Album Chart for the longest time (twenty-one weeks), beating the previous record set by Vasco Rossi. At the end of the year, it was also the most sold and listened to album in Italy, with every song certified. 16 December 2024 marked the date when Sirio was officially certified as a diamond record.

In 2023, Lazza took part in the Sanremo Music Festival 2023 for the first time in his career. Here he presented the song "Cenere", finishing in second place. For the event dedicated to music covers, he performed "La fine" by Nesli with Emma Marrone and Laura Marzadori.

On 31 March 2023, during the artist's first arena tour, Lazza released a single "Zonda". In the same year, Drillionaire's album 10 was released, in which Lazza appears as a guest artist on four songs, including the single "Bon ton", which debuted at the top of the Top Singles chart. On November 17 of the same year, he collaborated on the song "G63" by Sfera Ebbasta in collaboration with Shiva. These were included in X2VR (2023).

=== 2024-present: Locura and Ostil3 feature ===
On 27 February 2024, Lazza released the single "100 messaggi", originally presented by the rapper at the final evening of the Sanremo Music Festival 2024. It was followed, on September 13 of the same year, by the release of "Zeri in più", a track made in collaboration with Laura Pausini. Both tracks came before the release of Lazza's fourth studio album Locura, which took place later that September.

On 19 September 2024, Lazza released his fourth studio album Locura. The album features 18 tracks with various collaborations. These collaborations include Laura Pausini, Ghali, Lil Baby, Marra, among others. Like Lazza's previous works, Locura achieved considerable commercial success, debuting at number one on the FIMI Album Chart and being certified platinum in just one week. It also became the best-selling album in the first week of Italian rap history, and the best-selling album in Italy overall, again in the same period, in the streaming era.

The album is described as representing an important chapter of Lazza's discography and life; the album contains Lazza's anger, based on an interview with the rapper. In the same interview, Lazza implicitly referred to the album as authentic, stating he refuses to "keep anything inside anymore." A tour was announced for the album in 2025: the "LOCURA TOUR 2025." On 6 June 2025, Lazza expanded this album by releasing modified versions of the album, titled LOCURA JAM and LOCURA OPERA respectively. These versions of the album feature real instruments playing the tracks, combined with interplay between musicians, and live energy. The album was recorded in Milan. This modified album "combines two distinct yet complementary souls: on one hand, the instinctive power of the music he plays, with songs that explode like a jam session; on the other, the orchestral reinterpretation of ten tracks entrusted to the Milan Symphony Orchestra, conducted by Maestro Enzo Campagnoli. The album has introspective lyrics and a production designed specifically for live stage performance.

On 19 September 2025, he appeared on four tracks of the 333 Mob collective's debut album Ostil3.

== Personal life ==
From 2020 to 2023, Lazza was in a relationship with model and dancer Debora Oggioni.

Since the end of 2023, he has been romantically involved with model and influencer Greta Orsingher. Their first child, Noah, was born on 13 November 2024.

== Discography ==
=== Studio albums ===
List of studio albums with album details
Title	Album details	Peak chart positions	Certifications
Title	Album details	ITA	Certifications
Zzala	Released: 14 April 2017; Label: 333Mob, Sony Music	3	FIMI: Platinum
Re Mida	Released: 1 March 2019; Label: 333Mob, Universal Music Group	1	FIMI: 6× Platinum
Sirio	Released: 8 April 2022; Label: 333Mob, Island	1	FIMI: Diamond
Locura	Released: 19 September 2024; Label: Island	1	FIMI: 6× Platinum

=== Mixtape albums ===
List of mixtape albums with album details
Title	Mixtape details	Peak chart positions	Certifications
Title	Mixtape details	ITA	Certifications
Destiny Mixtape	Released: 5 November 2012; Label: Independent	—	
K1 Mixtape	Released: 29 December 2014; Label: Blocco Recordz	—	
J	Released: 17 July 2020; Label: 333Mob, Universal Music Group	1	FIMI: 2× Platinum

=== Singles ===
==== As lead artist ====
List of singles as lead artist, with selected chart positions, showing year released and album name
Title	Year	Peak chart positions			Certifications	Album
Title	Year	ITA	SWI	WW	Certifications	Album
"Sofisticato"	2012	—	—	—		Destiny Mixtape
"May Day"	2013	—	—	—		Non-album singles
"Wall Street Freestyle"	2016	—	—	—		Non-album singles
"DDA"	2016	78	—	—	FIMI: Gold	Zzala
"Super Santos Freestyle"	2016	—	—	—		Non-album singles
"Fuego"	2017	—	—	—		Non-album singles
"Maleducati"	2017	—	—	—		Non-album singles
"Ouverture"	2017	—	—	—		Zzala
"MOB" (featuring Nitro and Salmo)	2017	34	—	—	FIMI: Platinum	Zzala
"Lario"	2017	42	—	—	FIMI: Platinum	Zzala
"Diablo"	2017	35	—	—	FIMI: Gold	Non-album singles
"Lario RMX" (featuring Fabri Fibra)	2018	—	—	—		Non-album singles
"Porto Cervo"	2018	54	—	—	FIMI: Platinum	Re Mida
"Gucci Ski Mask" (featuring Gué Pequeno)	2019	25	—	—	FIMI: Gold	Re Mida
"Netflix"	2019	19	—	—	FIMI: Platinum	Re Mida
"Over2re"	2019	18	—	—	FIMI: Gold	Re Mida Aurum
"Ouv3rture"	2022	34	—	—	FIMI: Platinum	Sirio
"Molotov"	2022	8	—	—	FIMI: 4× Platinum	Sirio
"Panico" (featuring Takagi & Ketra)	2022	2	—	—	FIMI: 6× Platinum	Sirio
"3 di cuori" (with Anna)	2022	28	—	—	FIMI: Platinum	Lista 47
"Cenere"	2023	1	5	68	FIMI: 8× Platinum	Sirio
"Zonda"	2023	9	—	—	FIMI: Gold	Non-album single
"100 messaggi"	2024	1	43	—	FIMI: 4× Platinum	Locura
"Zeri in più (Locura)" (with Laura Pausini)	2024	1	—	—	FIMI: Gold	Locura
"Male da vendere"	2024	15	—	—		Locura
"Ouverfoure"	2024	30	—	—		Non-album single
"—" denotes singles that did not chart or were not released.

==== As featured artist ====
List of singles, with chart positions, album name and certifications
Title	Year	Peak chart positions		Certifications	Album
Title	Year	ITA	SWI	Certifications	Album
"Gabbiano/Moonrock" (Dani Faiv featuring Lazza)	2018	—	—		Fruit Joint + Gusto
"Montenapo" (Gué Pequeno featuring Lazza)	2019	29	—	FIMI: Gold	Gelida estate EP
"Fiori" (Giaime featuring Lazza)	2019	51	—	FIMI: Platinum	Non-album single
"Parola" (Giaime featuring Lazza and Emis Killa)	2020	—	—	FIMI: Platinum	Mula
"Mister" (Jack the Smoker featuring Lazza and Jake La Furia)	2020	—	—		Ho fatto tardi
"Gua10" (Tha Supreme featuring Lazza)	2020	15	—	FIMI: Gold	23 6451
"Siri" (Tha Supreme featuring Lazza and Sfera Ebbasta)	2022	1	92	FIMI: 4× Platinum	Carattere speciale
"Caos" (Fabri Fibra featuring Lazza and Madame)	2022	2	—	FIMI: 2× Platinum	Caos
"Chiagne" (Geolier featuring Lazza, Takagi & Ketra)	2022	2	—	FIMI: 3× Platinum	Il coraggio dei bambini
"Bon ton" (Drillionaire featuring Lazza, Blanco, Sfera Ebbasta & Michelangelo)	2023	1	87	FIMI: 5× Platinum	10
"Amore cane" (Emma featuring Lazza)	2023	23	—	FIMI: Gold	Souvenir
"BBE" (Anna featuring Lazza)	2024	4	—	FIMI: 2× Platinum	Vera Baddie
"—" denotes singles that did not chart or were not released.

=== Other charted songs ===
List of other charted songs, with selected chart positions, showing year released and album name
Title	Year	Peak chart positions	Certifications	Album
Title	Year	ITA	Certifications	Album
"Origami"	2017	94		Zzala
"Per sempre"	2019	67		Re Mida
"Box logo" (featuring Fabri Fibra)	2019	24	FIMI: Gold	Re Mida
"Re Mida"	2019	34	FIMI: Platinum	Re Mida
"Morto mai"	2019	38	FIMI: 4× Platinum	Re Mida
"Superman"	2019	55	FIMI: Gold	Re Mida
"2 cellulari"	2019	63		Re Mida
"Cazal" (featuring Izi)	2019	30	FIMI: Gold	Re Mida
"24H"	2019	61	FIMI: Gold	Re Mida
"Catrame" (featuring Tedua)	2019	18	FIMI: 2× Platinum	Re Mida
"Povero te"	2019	80		Re Mida
"Desperado"	2019	92		Re Mida
"Iside" (featuring Luchè)	2019	41	FIMI: Platinum	Re Mida
"No selfie" (featuring Giaime)	2019	96		Re Mida
"Bud Spencer" (with Salmo)	2019	15	FIMI: Gold	Machete Mixtape 4
"Ho paura di uscire 2" (with Salmo)	2019	1	FIMI: 2× Platinum	Machete Mixtape 4
"Sugar" (with Salmo)	2019	18	FIMI: Gold	Machete Mixtape 4
"Gigolò" (featuring Sfera Ebbasta & Capo Plaza)	2019	1	FIMI: 2× Platinum	Re Mida Aurum
"Dry (La mia ora)"	2019	49		Re Mida Aurum
"Million Dollar" (featuring Emis Killa)	2019	32		Re Mida Aurum
"Frio"	2019	71		Re Mida Aurum
"J"	2020	24	FIMI: Platinum	J
"Alyx" (featuring Capo Plaza)	2020	12	FIMI: Platinum	J
"2 tiri" (featuring Thasup)	2020	6	FIMI: Platinum	J
"Moncler" (featuring Pyrex e Gué Pequeno)	2020	28		J
"Mon amour" (featuring Shiva)	2020	30	FIMI: Gold	J
"Slime" (featuring Rondodasosa)	2020	22	FIMI: Platinum	J
"Clean" (featuring Tony Effe)	2020	26	FIMI: Gold	J
"Friend" (featuring Shiva & Geolier)	2020	32	FIMI: Gold	J
"L'erba voglio (Geordie)" (featuring Emis Killa)	2020	37		J
"Limbo" (featuring Gemitaiz)	2020	34	FIMI: Gold	J
"Mezzo sport (64 bars)" (with Drillionaire)	2021	77		Red Bull 64 bars, the Album
"Alibi"	2022	15	FIMI: Platinum	Sirio
"Sogni d'oro"	2022	16	FIMI: Platinum	Sirio
"Bugia" (featuring Tory Lanez)	2022	14	FIMI: Gold	Sirio
"Cinema"	2022	22	FIMI: Platinum	Sirio
"Piove" (featuring Sfera Ebbasta)	2022	1	FIMI: 4× Platinum	Sirio
"Jefe"	2022	30	FIMI: Gold	Sirio
"Topboy" (featuring Noyz Narcos)	2022	17	FIMI: Platinum	Sirio
"Puto" (featuring French Montana)	2022	24	FIMI: Gold	Sirio
"Senza rumore"	2022	26	FIMI: Platinum	Sirio
"Nessuno" (featuring Geolier)	2022	16	FIMI: 2× Platinum	Sirio
"3 pali"	2022	32	FIMI: Gold	Sirio
"Uscito di galera"	2022	9	FIMI: 5× Platinum	Sirio
"Nulla di"	2022	37	FIMI: Platinum	Sirio
"Replay"	2022	47	FIMI: Gold	Sirio
"MI Anthem" (with Salmo & Verano)	2022	51		Blocco 181 – Original Soundtrack
"Abitudine"	2024	6	FIMI: Gold	Locura
"Fentanyl" (featuring Sfera Ebbasta)	2024	1	FIMI: Gold	Locura
"Certe cose"	2024	9	FIMI: Gold	Locura
"-3 (Perdere il volo)" (featuring Marracash)	2024	5	FIMI: Gold	Locura
"Ghetto Superstar" (featuring Ghali)	2024	3	FIMI: Gold	Locura
"Verdi nei viola"	2024	7		Locura
"Canzone d'odio" (featuring Lil Baby)	2024	2	FIMI: Platinum	Locura
"Casanova" (featuring Artie 5ive)	2024	8		Locura
"Estraneo" (featuring Guè)	2024	16		Locura
"Hot"	2024	13		Locura
"Mezze verità" (featuring Kid Yugi)	2024	10	FIMI: Gold	Locura
"Safari"	2024	22		Locura
"Giorno da cani"	2024	28		Locura
"Buio davanti"	2024	10	FIMI: 2× Platinum	Locura
"Dolcevita"	2024	25		Locura
"Non sei più tu" (with Geolier)	2026	1		Tutto è possibile: Atto II
"—" denotes singles that did not chart or were not released.

== Tours ==
- 2017 – Fuego Tour
- 2017 – Zzala Tour
- 2019 – Re Mida Tour
- 2022 – Sirio Tour
- 2023 - Ouver-Tour
- 2025 - Locura Tour

== Awards and nominations ==
Year	Award	Category	Work	Result
2023	Sanremo Music Festival	Big Artists	Cenere	2nd place
2023	MTV Europe Music Awards	Best Italian Act	Himself	Nominated
