= Blu celeste (album) =

Studio album by Blanco
- Released: 10 September 2021
- Recorded: 2020–2021
- Genre: Pop rap; R&B
- Length: 33:33
- Label: Universal
- Producer: Michelangelo; Greg Willen; d.whale

Blanco chronology
Blu celeste (2021)	Innamorato (2023)

Singles from Blu celeste
- 1. "Notti in bianco" Released: 23 July 2020; 2. "Ladro di fiori" Released: 20 October 2020; 3. "Paraocchi" Released: 25 February 2021; 4. "Blu celeste" Released: 10 September 2021; 5. "Finché non mi seppelliscono" Released: 12 November 2021

Professional ratings
Review scores
Source	Rating
Ondarock	6/10

Blu celeste (transl. Sky blue) is the debut studio album by Italian singer-songwriter Blanco. The album was produced by Michelangelo and released on 10 September 2021 by Universal.

The album peaked at number 1 of FIMI's album chart and was certified seven times platinum in Italy.

== Track listing ==
Blu celeste track listing
No.	Title	Lyrics	Music	Producer(s)	Length
1.	"Mezz'ora di sole"	Riccardo Fabbriconi	Michele Zocca	Michelangelo	1:58
2.	"Notti in bianco"	Fabbriconi	Zocca; Davide Simonetta	Michelangelo	2:56
3.	"Figli di puttana"	Fabbriconi	Zocca; Gregory Taurone	Michelangelo; Greg Willen	2:13
4.	"Blu celeste"	Fabbriconi	Zocca	Michelangelo	3:26
5.	"Sai cosa c'è"	Fabbriconi	Zocca	Michelangelo	2:29
6.	"Paraocchi"	Fabbriconi	Zocca; Simonetta	Michelangelo; d.whale	2:36
7.	"Lucciole"	Fabbriconi	Zocca; Simonetta	Michelangelo	2:56
8.	"Finché non mi seppelliscono"	Fabbriconi	Zocca	Michelangelo	2:48
9.	"Pornografia (Bianco paradiso)"	Fabbriconi	Zocca	Michelangelo	2:38
10.	"David"	Fabbriconi	Zocca	Michelangelo	3:13
11.	"Ladro di fiori"	Fabbriconi	Zocca; Taurone	Michelangelo	3:08
12.	"Afrodite"	Fabbriconi	Zocca	Michelangelo	3:12
Total length:					33:33

== Charts ==
=== Weekly charts ===
Weekly chart performance for Blu celeste
Chart (2021)	Peak position
Italian Albums (FIMI)	1
Swiss Albums (Schweizer Hitparade)	11

=== Year-end charts ===
2021 year-end chart performance for Blu celeste
Chart (2021)	Position
Italian Albums (FIMI)	4

2022 year-end chart performance for Blu celeste
Chart (2022)	Position
Italian Albums (FIMI)	3

2023 year-end chart performance for Blu celeste
Chart (2023)	Position
Italian Albums (FIMI)	40

2024 year-end chart performance for Blu celeste
Chart (2024)	Position
Italian Albums (FIMI)	98

== Certifications ==
Certifications for Blu celeste
Region	Certification	Certified units/sales
Italy (FIMI)	7× Platinum	350,000^{‡}
^{‡} Sales+streaming figures based on certification alone.

== Year-end lists ==
Select year-end rankings of Blu celeste
Publication	List	Rank	Ref.
Rolling Stone	The 20 Best Italian Albums of 2021	7	
