= Blu celeste (song) =

Single by Blanco

from the album Blu celeste
- Released: 10 September 2021
- Length: 3:26
- Label: Island
- Songwriters: Riccardo Fabbriconi; Michele Zocca
- Producer: Michelangelo

Blanco singles chronology
"Mi fai impazzire" (2021)	"Blu celeste" (2021)	"Finché non mi seppelliscono" (2021)

Music video
- "Blu celeste" on YouTube

"Blu celeste" (transl. Sky blue) is a song written and recorded by Italian singer Blanco. It was released on 10 September 2021 through Island Records as the fourth single from his debut album of the same name.

It was written by Blanco and Michelangelo, and produced by the latter. The song peaked at number 1 on the FIMI single chart and was certified triple platinum in Italy.

== Music video ==
The music video for "Blu celeste", directed by Simone Peluso, was released on 9 September 2021 via Blanco's YouTube channel. As of 15 February 2022, the video has over 16 million views on YouTube.

== Personnel ==
Credits adapted from Tidal.

- Michelangelo – producer and composer
- Blanco – associated performer, author, vocals

== Charts ==
=== Weekly charts ===
Weekly chart performance of "Blu celeste"
Chart (2021)	Peak position
Italy (FIMI)	1

=== Year-end charts ===
2021 year-end chart performance for "Blu celeste"
Chart (2021)	Position
Italy (FIMI)	37

2022 year-end chart performance for "Blu celeste"
Chart (2022)	Position
Italy (FIMI)	84

== Certifications ==
Region	Certification	Certified units/sales
Italy (FIMI)	3× Platinum	300,000^{‡}
^{‡} Sales+streaming figures based on certification alone.
