= Drillionaire =

Musical artist (born 1996)

- Born: Diego Vincenzo Vettraino; 26 August 1993 (age 32)
- Occupations: Record producer; beatmaker; songwriter; disc jockey
- Years active: 2016–present

Diego Vincenzo Vettraino (born 26 August 1993), known professionally as Drillionaire, is an Italian record producer, beatmaker, songwriter, disc jockey, and former footballer.

== Life and career ==
Vettraino grew up in the small Lombard town of Vizzolo Predabissi. He initially pursued a career in association football as a midfielder. He developed through the youth ranks of Pergolettese before transferring in 2010 to Siena, where he joined the youth team. From Siena, he moved to Salernitana, making his Lega Pro debut, with eleven appearances and one goal. Subsequently, he played for Trapani, appearing in two Serie B matches during the 2013–14 season.

He continued his playing career between Lega Pro and Serie D with clubs including L'Aquila, Gubbio, Monza, and Pro Patria, but his progress was halted by a serious knee injury. After a final season in Serie D with Arconatese, he retired from football at age 24 to pursue a career in music.

Vittraino began working as a producer under the name of "Drillionaire", collaborating with rapper Lazza, and later with Rkomi and Shiva. In 2020, he was credited as a producer on DrefGold album Elo, Lazza's J, and Sfera Ebbasta's Famoso. In 2021, he produced most tracks on Tony Effe's album Untouchable. In 2022, he served as the artistic director and producer of Lazza's album Sirio, which became the best-selling album of the year.

On 30 June 2023, he released his debut solo album, 10, featuring the single "Bon ton" with Blanco, Lazza, Sfera Ebbasta, and Michelangelo. The track reached number one on the Italian charts and was certified quintuple platinum.

== Discography ==
=== Studio albums ===
List of studio albums, with chart positions and certifications
Title	Details	Peak chart positions		Certifications
Title	Details	ITA	SWI	Certifications
10	Released: 30 June 2023; Label: Island, Universal; Format: CD, digital download, streaming	2	13	FIMI: 3× Platinum

=== Singles ===
List of singles, with chart positions and certifications
Title	Year	Peak chart positions	Certifications	Album
Title	Year	ITA	Certifications	Album
"Bon ton" (with Lazza, Blanco and Sfera Ebbasta)	2023	1	FIMI: 5× Platinum	10
