= Blanco (singer) =

Italian singer-songwriter (born 2003)

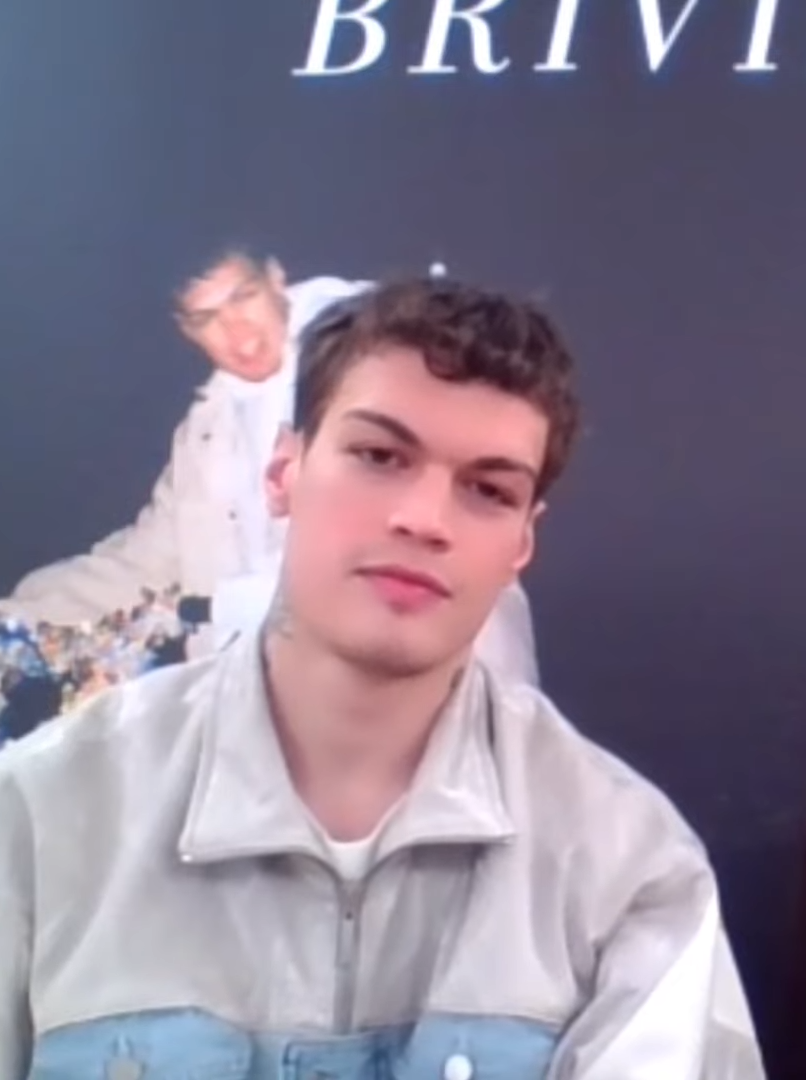
- Blanco in 2022

Background information
- Born: Riccardo Fabbriconi; 10 February 2003 (age 23); Brescia, Italy
- Genres: Pop; pop punk; rock; pop rap; trap
- Occupations: Singer; songwriter; rapper
- Works: Discography
- Years active: 2020–present
- Labels: Universal; Island

Riccardo Fabbriconi (born 10 February 2003), known professionally as Blanco, is an Italian singer, rapper and songwriter. He rose to prominence in 2021 with the hits "La canzone nostra" and "Mi fai impazzire", which topped the Italian Singles Chart. He later released his debut album Blu celeste, driven by the singles "Notti in bianco", "Paraocchi" and the title track. In 2022, he won the 72nd Sanremo Music Festival alongside Mahmood with the song "Brividi", with which the duo represented Italy in the Eurovision Song Contest 2022, finishing in sixth place.

== Early life ==
Riccardo Fabbriconi was born in Brescia on 10 February 2003, to a father from Rome and a mother from Lombardy, and raised in Calvagese della Riviera, a small town on Lake Garda. He spent most of his childhood between his hometown, Brescia and Desenzano del Garda, where he attended school. During his childhood, his father introduced him to artists such as Lucio Battisti, Lucio Dalla, and Pino Daniele. He also enjoyed listening to pop music on the radio. Growing up, he was involved in the Italian hip hop scene.

== Career ==
=== 2020–2021: "Mi fai impazzire" and Blu celeste ===
In June 2020, he released on SoundCloud his EP Quarantine Paranoid, thanks to which he was noticed and signed by Universal and Island Records. He subsequently released his debut single "Belladonna (Adieu)", followed by his second single "Notti in bianco", which became a sleeper hit in the summer of 2021, peaking at number two on FIMI's singles chart. On 8 January 2021, Blanco, Mace and Salmo released the collaborative single "La canzone nostra". It became Blanco's first single to peak at number one on FIMI's singles chart and was certified quintuple platinum, having sold 350,000 copies.

On 26 February 2021, Blanco released his single "Paraocchi", which also reached the top ten of FIMI's singles chart. On 18 June 2021, he released the hit single "Mi fai impazzire" in collaboration with Sfera Ebbasta; it peaked at number one on FIMI's singles chart for eight consecutive weeks and was certified sextuple platinum, having sold 420,000 copies.

On 10 September 2021, Blanco released his debut studio album Blu celeste, containing nine original tracks produced by Michelangelo, as well as the previously published singles "Notti in bianco", "Ladro di fiori" and "Paraocchi". The album, which debuted atop FIMI's album chart, was certified as a gold record a week after its release, having sold 250,000 album-equivalent units, and as a platinum record the following week. Simultaneously, the lead single of the same name debuted at number one on FIMI's singles chart and Blanco's songs occupied the entire top ten; furthermore, all twelve tracks included in the album appeared concomitantly on the chart. In November 2021, the track "Finché non mi seppelliscono" was selected as a radio single.

=== 2022–2024: Sanremo, Eurovision Song Contest and Innamorato ===
In December 2021, RAI announced that Mahmood and Blanco would be participating together in the Sanremo Music Festival 2022 with the song "Brividi". They won the competition with over fifty percent of the vote and subsequently confirmed their participation in the Eurovision Song Contest 2022 as Italy's representatives. Critics commented how for the first time in the history of the festival a performance put on the same level homosexual and heterosexual love. "Brividi" recorded over 3.3 million streams in 24 hours, becoming the most-streamed song in a single day on Spotify in Italy. It debuted at number one on FIMI's singles chart and peaked at number 15 on the Billboard Global 200.

On 3 April 2022, Blanco embarked on the Blu celeste Tour, consisting of two legs and 27 shows, which concluded on 17 September 2022 in Milan. Blanco was chosen by the Italian Episcopal Conference (CEI) to introduce Pope Francis's meeting at Piazza San Pietro on 18 April 2022. He performed "Blu celeste" accompanied by Michelangelo. The choice was criticized by the bishop of Ventimiglia, Monsignor Antonio Suetta, who thought the message expressed through Blanco's performance was "not suitable to a Catholic context"; however, a representative of the CEI, Don Michele Falabretti, replied to the concerns and restated the decision to invite Blanco to the event. In May 2022, Blanco and Mahmood participated in the Eurovision Song Contest 2022 held in Turin and finished in sixth place. In June 2022, he released "Nostalgia", his first single after Sanremo and the Eurovision, which peaked at number two on FIMI's singles chart and was certified triple platinum by FIMI.

Blanco released "L'isola delle rose", the first single from his second studio album, Innamorato, on 27 January 2023. Blanco performed the song as a guest during the first night of the Sanremo Music Festival 2023, but in-ear monitoring issues made him unable to hear himself while he was singing. He then proceeded to cause damage to the rose garden set on stage, for which he was booed by the audience at the end of his performance. He later apologized. Innamorato was released on 14 April 2023. On 14 April, the album was followed by the release of the single "Un briciolo di allegria", a duet with Mina. The track reached number one on the FIMI Singles Chart, becoming Blanco's fifth chart-topping single in Italy. In June, he featured on "Bon ton" by Drillionaire, alongside Lazza, Sfera Ebbasta, and Michelangelo. This track also reached the top of the Italian chart.

On 21 June 2024, he released the new single "Desnuda", entirely in Spanish, aimed at launching the artist into the hispanic market. The single did not achieve the expected success, debuting only at number 58 on the Italian charts, and then quickly disappearing. Still affected by the aftermath of the Sanremo incident and by the disappointing results of his stadium tour dates, Blanco decided to pause his activities and focus solely on his work as a songwriter.

=== 2025–present: Ma' ===
During this break, Blanco wrote three songs that competed in the Sanremo Music Festival 2025: "Se t'innamori muori" performed by Noemi, "Lentamente" by Irama, and "La cura per me" by Giorgia, which placed 13th, 9th, and 6th respectively.

On 9 May 2025, after nearly a year of hiatus, the single "Piangere a 90" was released, debuting at number 1 on the Italian singles chart. It was followed by "Maledetta rabbia" on 20 June. On 27 March 2026 Blanco published the collaboraion "Ricordi" with Elisa as the fourth single from his third studio album Ma'.

== Artistry ==
Blanco was originally described as a rapper and trapper, although he rejected labels in interviews, saying that "music should always and exclusively be listened without giving too many definitions". After the release of his debut album, critics found pop, punk, rock, and funk influences in Blanco's music. Rolling Stone Italia defined him as "genreless". Claudio Cabona of Rockol commented on how Blanco is capable of mixing rap with a "nihilistic punk attitude". La Repubblica described him as "the new face of the post-trap". While talking about his way of delivering his lyrics, inspired by his personal experiences, Blanco said, "I don't sing, I shout with the heart." Among his inspirations, Blanco named several Italian singer-songwriters including Adriano Celentano, Domenico Modugno, Luigi Tenco, Franco Battiato, and Gino Paoli.

== Discography ==
- Blu celeste (2021)
- Innamorato (2023)
- Ma' (2026)

== Tours ==
- Blu celeste Tour (2022)
- Innamorato stadi (2023)
- Live 2026 – Il primo tour nei palazetti (2026)

== Awards and nominations ==
Name of the award ceremony, year presented, award category, nominee(s) of the award, and the result of the nomination
Year	Award ceremony	Category	Work	Result	Ref.
2021	SEAT Music Awards	Single Award	"Notti in bianco"	Won	
2021	SEAT Music Awards	Single Award	"La canzone nostra"	Won	
2021	SEAT Music Awards	Single Award	"Mi fai impazzire"	Won	
2022	Sanremo Music Festival	Big Artists	"Brividi"	1st Place	
2022	Eurovision Song Contest	—N/a	"Brividi"	6th Place	

Awards and achievements
Preceded by Måneskin	Sanremo Music Festival winner with Mahmood; 2022	Succeeded by Marco Mengoni
Preceded by Måneskin with "Zitti e buoni"	Italy in the Eurovision Song Contest with Mahmood; 2022	Succeeded by Marco Mengoni with "Due vite"
