= Michele Zocca =

Italian record producer (born 1994)

- Also known as: Michelangelo
- Born: 1994 (age 31–32); Cremona, Italy
- Occupations: Record producer; singer-songwriter; musician
- Years active: 2009–present
- Spouse: Cecilia Molardi
- Children: 1
- Relatives: Italo Mari (grandfather)

Michele Zocca, known professionally as Michelangelo, is an Italian record producer, singer-songwriter and musician, best known for his frequent collaborations with Blanco. He became interested in music at an early age and later joined a conservatory, but soon left to study music production as an autodidact. He rose in popularity after producing Blanco's debut studio album, Blu celeste, and his entry for the Sanremo Music Festival 2022, "Brividi", a collaboration with Mahmood. In 2022, he was the third songwriter with the most certified copies in Italy, having sold 1.8 million copies across all his collaborations.

== Life and career ==
Michele Zocca was born in Cremona, Italy, in 1994 and lives in the comune of Vescovato, where his recording studio is currently situated. His mother, Raffaella Mari, is a PE teacher and a sports manager. His maternal grandfather is sports shooter Italo Mari. A self-taught musician, he became fascinated with the drums when he was in elementary school and went on to learn multiple instruments, including the electric guitar and the bass. Among his influences, he cited the duo Battisti-Mogol. During high school, he joined several bands. He pursued his education at the Conservatorio Arrigo Boito in Parma, but he quit a year later to dedicate more time to his growing career. He started studying music production and audio mixing as an autodidact. From 2016, Zocca started working with renowned artists such as Loredana Bertè, Paola Turci and Niccolò Agliardi. He first met Blanco at a studio in Milan in November 2019. After working together for a year, Blanco released his debut studio album, Blu celeste, featuring Zocca as the main producer.

In 2022, Zocca produced Mahmood and Blanco's entry for the Sanremo Music Festival 2022, "Brividi". The song ended up winning the contest and Zocca was subsequently awarded by the administration of Vescovato. That same year, he was the third songwriter with the most certified copies in Italy, having sold 1.8 million copies thanks to his partnership with Blanco and his collaborations with other Italian rising artists such as Ariete and Rkomi. In April 2023, Blanco released his second studio album, Innamorato, written in collaboration with Michelangelo. In June 2023, he wrote and featured on Drillionaire's song "Bon ton" along with Blanco, Sfera Ebbasta and Lazza, which reached number one on Italy's FIMI Singles Chart. In September 2023, Michelangelo appeared on the third season of the Italian edition of MTV Cribs.

The following year, Michelangelo wrote two entries for the Sanremo Music Festival 2024, "Casa mia" by Ghali and "I p' me, tu p' te" by Geolier. At Sanremo, "I p' me, tu p' me" finished in second place, while "Casa mia" placed at number four; "I p' me, tu p' te" also reached number one on the FIMI Singles Chart.

== Personal life ==
Zocca married stylist Cecilia Molardi, with whom he had a daughter, born in 2021.

== Selected production discography ==
Song title, original artist, album of release, and year of release
Song	Artist(s)	Album	Year	Ref.
"Afrodite"	Blanco	Blu celeste	2021	
"Ancora ancora ancora"	Blanco	Innamorato	2023	
"Anima tormentata"	Blanco	Innamorato	2023	
"Amatoriale"	Blanco	Non-album single	2020	
"Aranciata"	Madame	L'amore	2023	
"Belladonna (Adieu)"	Blanco	Non-album single	2020	
"Blu celeste"	Blanco	Blu celeste	2021	
"Bon ton"	Drillionaire featuring Lazza, Sfera Ebbasta, Blanco and Michelangelo	10	2023	
"Brividi"	Mahmood and Blanco	Non-album single	2022	
"Casa mia"	Ghali	Non-album single	2024	
"Castelli di lenzuola"	Ariete	Specchio	2022	
"David"	Blanco	Blu celeste	2021	
"Figli di puttana"	Blanco	Blu celeste	2021	
"Finché non mi seppelliscono"	Blanco	Blu celeste	2021	
"Fotocopia"	Blanco	Innamorato	2023	
"Freccia"	Rancore	Xenoverso	2022	
"Giulia"	Blanco	Innamorato	2023	
"Innamorato"	Blanco	Innamorato	2023	
"I p' me, tu p' te"	Geolier	Non-album single	2024	
"Lacrime di piombo"	Blanco	Innamorato	2023	
"Ladro di fiori"	Blanco	Blu celeste	2021	
"La mia famiglia"	Blanco	Innamorato	2023	
"L'isola delle rose"	Blanco	Innamorato	2023	
"Lucciole"	Blanco	Blu celeste	2021	
"L'ultimo ostacolo"	Paola Turci	Viva da morire	2019	
"Mezz'ora di sole"	Blanco	Blu celeste	2021	
"Mi fai impazzire"	Blanco and Sfera Ebbasta	Non-album single	2021	
"Monday"	Geolier featuring Shiva and Michelangelo	Il coraggio dei bambini	2023	
"Nemesi"	Marracash featuring Blanco	Noi, loro, gli altri	2021	
"Nostalgia"	Blanco	Non-album single	2022	
"Notti in bianco"	Blanco	Blu celeste	2021	
"Paraocchi"	Blanco	Blu celeste	2021	
"Pornografia (Bianco paradiso)"	Blanco	Blu celeste	2021	
"Raggi del sole"	Blanco	Innamorato	2023	
"Sai cosa c'è"	Blanco	Blu celeste	2021	
"Scusa"	Blanco	Innamorato	2023	
"Tutti muoiono"	Madame featuring Blanco	Madame	2021	
"Un'altra ora"	Ariete	Non-album single	2023	
"Un briciolo di allegria"	Blanco featuring Mina	Innamorato	2023	
"Vada come vada"	Blanco	Innamorato	2023	
"Aranciata"	Madame		2023	
"La cura per me"	Giorgia	Non-album single	2025	
"Piangere a 90"	Blanco	Non-album single	2025	
