= Geolier discography =

Discography of Italian rapper Geolier

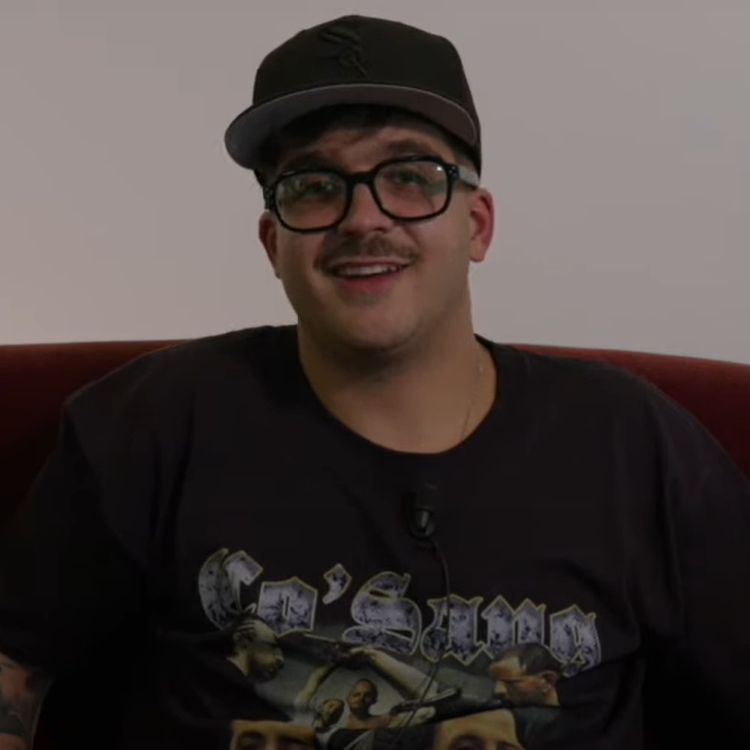
- Geolier in January 2024
- Studio albums: 4
- Singles: 46

The discography of Italian rapper Geolier consists of four studio albums and forty-six singles.

== Studio albums ==
List of studio albums, with chart positions and certifications
| Title | Album details | Peak chart positions | | | Certifications |
| Title | Album details | ITA | BEL (WA) | SWI | Certifications |
|---|---|---|---|---|---|
| Emanuele | Released: 10 October 2019; Label: BFM, Island, Universal; Format: CD, LP, digital download, streaming | 2 | — | — | FIMI: 4× Platinum |
| Il coraggio dei bambini | Released: 6 January 2023; Label: Columbia, Sony Music; Format: CD, LP, digital download, streaming | 1 | — | 8 | FIMI: 8× Platinum |
| Dio lo sa | Released: 7 June 2024; Label: Warner Music Italy; Format: CD, LP, digital download, streaming | 1 | — | 9 | FIMI: 8× Platinum |
| Tutto è possibile | Released: 16 January 2026; Label: Warner Music Italy; Format: CD, LP, digital download, streaming | 1 | 192 | 6 | FIMI: 5× Platinum |
"—" denotes album that did not chart or were not released.

== Singles ==
=== As lead artist ===
List of singles as lead artist, with selected chart positions, showing year released and album name
| Title | Year | Peak chart positions | | | Certifications | Album |
| Title | Year | ITA | SWI | WW | Certifications | Album |
|---|---|---|---|---|---|---|
| "P Secondigliano" (featuring Nicola Siciliano) | 2018 | — | — | — | FIMI: Platinum | Non-album singles |
| "Mercedes" | 2018 | — | — | — | | Non-album singles |
| "Queen" | 2018 | — | — | — | | Non-album singles |
| "Mexico" | 2018 | — | — | — | | Non-album singles |
| "Como te" (featuring Emis Killa) | 2019 | 66 | — | — | FIMI: Gold | Emanuele |
| "Narcos" | 2019 | 40 | — | — | FIMI: Platinum | Emanuele |
| "Yacht" (featuring Luchè) | 2019 | 24 | — | — | FIMI: Gold | Emanuele |
| "Fuego" (with Neves17 and Lele Blade) | 2020 | 35 | — | — | FIMI: Gold | Non-album singles |
| "M' manc" (with Shablo and Sfera Ebbasta) | 2020 | 1 | — | — | FIMI: 6× Platinum | Non-album singles |
| "Rap Tutorial (64 Bars)" (with Luchè) | 2021 | 87 | — | — | | Red Bull 64 Bars, The Album |
| "Cuore" (with Shablo and Coez) | 2022 | 88 | — | — | | Non-album single |
| "Chiagne" (featuring Lazza and Takagi & Ketra) | 2022 | 2 | — | — | FIMI: 4× Platinum | Il coraggio dei bambini |
| "Money" | 2022 | 8 | — | — | FIMI: Platinum | Il coraggio dei bambini |
| "Come vuoi" | 2023 | 9 | — | — | FIMI: 5× Platinum | Il coraggio dei bambini |
| "I p' me, tu p' te" | 2024 | 1 | 13 | 91 | FIMI: 4× Platinum | Dio lo sa |
| "L'ultima poesia" (with Ultimo) | 2024 | 1 | 72 | — | FIMI: 4× Platinum | Dio lo sa |
| "El Pibe de Oro" | 2024 | 5 | — | — | FIMI: 2× Platinum | Dio lo sa |
| "Una vita fa" (featuring Shiva) | 2024 | 23 | — | — | FIMI: Gold | Dio lo sa |
| "Episodio d'amore" | 2024 | 11 | — | — | FIMI: 2× Platinum | Dio lo sa |
| "Mai per sempre" | 2024 | 8 | — | — | FIMI: Gold | Dio lo sa: Atto II |
| "Fotografia" | 2025 | 1 | — | — | FIMI: Platinum | Tutto è possibile |
| "081" | 2025 | 3 | — | — | FIMI: Gold | Tutto è possibile |
| "Phantom" (featuring 50 Cent) | 2025 | 1 | — | — | FIMI: Gold | Tutto è possibile |
| "Canzone d'amore" | 2026 | 5 | — | — | FIMI: Platinum | Tutto è possibile |
| "Amen" | 2026 | 47 | — | — | | Tutto è possibile |
| "Stelle" | 2026 | 3 | — | — | FIMI: Platinum | Tutto è possibile |
| "Autorità" | 2026 | 4 | — | — | FIMI: Gold | Tutto è possibile: Atto II |
| "Per noi" (featuring Achille Lauro) | 2026 | 1 | — | — | | Tutto è possibile: Atto II |
| "Winner" | 2026 | 2 | — | — | | Tutto è possibile: Atto II |
"—" denotes a single that did not chart or was not released.

=== As featured artist ===
List of singles as featured artist, with selected chart positions, showing year released and album name
| Title | Year | Peak chart positions | | Certifications | Album |
| Title | Year | ITA | SWI | Certifications | Album |
|---|---|---|---|---|---|
| "E' guagliun" (Peppe Soks and Dat Boi Dee featuring Geolier) | 2018 | — | — | | Non-album single |
| "Sosa" (Lele Blade featuring Geolier) | 2018 | — | — | | Ninja Gaiden |
| "Gang" (Samurai Jay, Dat Boi Dee and M4W featuring Geolier) | 2019 | 45 | — | FIMI: Gold | Non-album singles |
| "Natale marziano 2k19" (Gianluca Carbone featuring Anna Tatangelo, Geolier, Livio Cori, Roberto Colella, Peppe Soks, Samurai Jay, Francesco Da Vinci, Bles and Soul Food Vocalist) | 2019 | — | — | | Non-album singles |
| "Vamos pa la banca" (Dat Boi Dee featuring Geolier, Samurai Jay and Lele Blade) | 2020 | 49 | — | | Non-album singles |
| "Nena" (Boro Boro featuring Geolier) | 2020 | 15 | — | FIMI: Platinum | Caldo |
| "Guapo" (Anna Tatangelo featuring Geolier) | 2020 | 84 | — | | Anna zero |
| "Buongiorno" (Gigi D'Alessio featuring Clementino, CoCo, Enzo Dong, Franco Ricciardi, LDA, Lele Blade, MV Killa, Geolier, Samurai Jay and Vale Lambo) | 2020 | 44 | — | FIMI: Platinum | Buongiorno |
| "Che me chiamme a fa?" (Rocco Hunt featuring Geolier) | 2021 | 8 | — | FIMI: Gold | Rivoluzione |
| "Fantasmi" (TY1 featuring Geolier and Marracash) | 2021 | 16 | — | FIMI: Platinum | Djungle |
| "Ready" (SLF featuring Geolier) | 2021 | 95 | — | | We the Squad: Vol. 1 |
| "Me vogl bene" (MV Killa featuring Geolier) | 2023 | 86 | — | | Fede |
| "Oro e diamanti" (Neves17 featuring Enzo Avitabile and Geolier) | 2023 | — | — | | Non-album singles |
| "Everyday" (Takagi & Ketra featuring Shiva, Anna and Geolier) | 2023 | 1 | 44 | FIMI: 4× Platinum | Non-album singles |
| "Baby U Want Me" (Vale Lambo featuring Geolier and Michelangelo) | 2024 | — | — | | Lamborghini a via Marina |
| "Switch" (Rvchet featuring BM, Geolier, Guè and Finem) | 2024 | — | — | | Non-album single |
| "Senza tuccà" (Gigi D'Alessio featuring Geolier) | 2024 | 67 | — | FIMI: Gold | Fra |
| "Limit Yok" (Summer Cem featuring Geolier) | 2024 | — | — | | Siki Jackson Moonwalk Edition |
| "Fieri di noi - United 4 Children" (I ragazzi del Verga featuring Alessandra Amoroso, Bresh, Clementino, Dani Faiv, Duala, Elodie, Emma, Fabio Rovazzi, Fred De Palma, Gaia, Geolier, Gigi D'Alessio, Paky, Petit, Rose Villain and The Kolors) | 2025 | — | — | | Non-album single |
"—" denotes a single that did not chart or was not released.

== Other charted songs ==
List of other charted songs, showing year released and album name
| Title | Year | Peak chart positions | Certifications | Album |
| Title | Year | ITA | Certifications | Album |
|---|---|---|---|---|
| "Queen RMX" (Madman featuring Geolier) | 2019 | 46 | | MM Vol. 3 |
| "Nisciun'" (Rocco Hunt featuring Geolier) | 2019 | 24 | FIMI: Platinum | Libertà |
| "Mattoni" (Night Skinny featuring Noyz Narcos, Shiva, Speranza, Gué Pequeno, Achille Lauro, Geolier, Lazza, Ernia, Side Baby and Taxi B) | 2019 | 11 | | Mattoni |
| "Life Style" (Night Skinny featuring Vale Lambo, Lele Blade, CoCo and Geolier) | 2019 | 54 | | Mattoni |
| "Senz e me" | 2019 | 69 | FIMI: Platinum | Emanuele |
| "Na catena" | 2019 | 92 | | Emanuele |
| "Vogl sul a te" | 2019 | 78 | FIMI: Platinum | Emanuele |
| "Amo ma chi t sap" (Geolier featuring MV Killa and Gué Pequeno) | 2019 | 82 | FIMI: Gold | Emanuele |
| "La strada è nostra" (Gianni Bismark featuring Geolier) | 2020 | 29 | | Nati diversi |
| "Cyborg" (Gué Pequeno featuring Geolier) | 2020 | 11 | FIMI: Gold | Mr. Fini |
| "Vittoria" | 2020 | 52 | | Emanuele (marchio registrato) |
| "Capo" | 2020 | 32 | FIMI: Platinum | Emanuele (marchio registrato) |
| "Sorry" | 2020 | 55 | FIMI: Gold | Emanuele (marchio registrato) |
| "Moncler" | 2020 | 43 | FIMI: Platinum | Emanuele (marchio registrato) |
| "Na catena RMX" (Geolier featuring Roshelle) | 2020 | 64 | FIMI: Platinum | Emanuele (marchio registrato) |
| "Friend" (Lazza featuring Shiva and Geolier) | 2020 | 32 | FIMI: Gold | J |
| "Comme si femmena" (Gigi D'Alessio featuring Geolier) | 2020 | 59 | | Buongiorno |
| "Comme si fragile" (Gigi D'Alessio featuring Geolier) | 2020 | 70 | | Buongiorno |
| "1, 2, 3 stella" (Pyrex featuring Geolier) | 2020 | 46 | | Dark Boys Club |
| "Alright" (Gemitaiz featuring Emis Killa and Geolier) | 2020 | 13 | | QVC9 |
| "Top Boy" (Mace featuring Geolier) | 2021 | 20 | FIMI: Gold | Obe |
| "No cap" (Emis Killa and Jake La Furia featuring Geolier) | 2021 | 13 | FIMI: Platinum | 17 (Dark Edition) |
| "Chello che vuò" (Lele Blade featuring Geolier) | 2021 | 92 | | Ambizione |
| "Blitz!" (Guè featuring Geolier) | 2021 | 4 | FIMI: Platinum | Guesus |
| "Creatur" (Sick Luke featuring Geolier and Ernia) | 2022 | 10 | | X2 |
| "Foot Locker" (Noyz Narcos featuring Geolier) | 2022 | 22 | | Virus |
| "18 anni" (SLF featuring Fabri Fibra and Geolier) | 2022 | 82 | | We the Squad: Vol. 1 |
| "Cadillac" (SLF featuring Geolier and Tony Effe) | 2022 | 92 | FIMI: 2× Platinum | We the Squad: Vol. 1 |
| "Comandamento" (Paky featuring Geolier) | 2022 | 13 | FIMI: Gold | Salvatore |
| "Over" (Luchè featuring Geolier) | 2022 | 30 | | Dove volano le aquile |
| "Nessuno" (Lazza featuring Geolier) | 2022 | 16 | FIMI: 2× Platinum | Sirio |
| "Fake" (Night Skinny featuring Geolier and Luchè) | 2022 | 17 | FIMI: Gold | Botox |
| "Giorni contati" (Night Skinny featuring Paky, Noyz Narcos, Geolier and Shiva) | 2022 | 5 | FIMI: Platinum | Botox |
| "Dedication" (Night Skinny featuring Geolier and Anice) | 2022 | 41 | | Botox |
| "BTX Posse" (Night Skinny featuring Fabri Fibra, Ernia, Lazza, Tony Effe, Coez, Geolier, Guè, Paky, MamboLosco and L'Immortale) | 2022 | 16 | FIMI: Gold | Botox |
| "Acqua tonica" (Ernia featuring Geolier and Junior K) | 2022 | 4 | FIMI: 2× Platinum | Io non ho paura |
| "Un altro show" (Shiva featuring Geolier) | 2022 | 31 | FIMI: Platinum | Milano Demons |
| "Ricchezza" | 2023 | 13 | FIMI: Gold | Il coraggio dei bambini |
| "Poco/Troppo" | 2023 | 22 | | Il coraggio dei bambini |
| "X caso" (Geolier featuring Sfera Ebbasta) | 2023 | 1 | FIMI: 4× Platinum | Il coraggio dei bambini |
| "Me vulev fa ruoss" | 2023 | 10 | FIMI: Platinum | Il coraggio dei bambini |
| "Lonely" | 2023 | 17 | FIMI: Gold | Il coraggio dei bambini |
| "Nun se ver" (featuring Guè) | 2023 | 14 | FIMI: Gold | Il coraggio dei bambini |
| "Monday" (featuring Shiva and Michelangelo) | 2023 | 3 | FIMI: Platinum | Il coraggio dei bambini |
| "Maradona" | 2023 | 21 | FIMI: Gold | Il coraggio dei bambini |
| "I Am" | 2023 | 23 | | Il coraggio dei bambini |
| "Napo****no" | 2023 | 31 | | Il coraggio dei bambini |
| "Niente di speciale" | 2023 | 49 | | Il coraggio dei bambini |
| "In trappola" (featuring Lele Blade) | 2023 | 42 | | Il coraggio dei bambini |
| "Here I Come" | 2023 | 47 | | Il coraggio dei bambini |
| "Non ci torni più" (Geolier featuring Paky) | 2023 | 33 | | Il coraggio dei bambini |
| "Give You My Love" | 2023 | 39 | | Il coraggio dei bambini |
| "Miez a via" (Baby Gang featuring Geolier) | 2023 | 21 | | L'angelo del male |
| "Non mi vedi" (Baby Gang featuring Fabri Fibra, Geolier, Ernia and Rkomi) | 2023 | 36 | | L'angelo del male |
| "2 secondi" | 2023 | 43 | FIMI: Gold | Il coraggio dei bambini: Atto II |
| "Il male che mi fai" (Geolier featuring Marracash) | 2023 | 1 | FIMI: 4× Platinum | Il coraggio dei bambini: Atto II |
| "Soldati" | 2023 | 24 | FIMI: Gold | Il coraggio dei bambini: Atto II |
| "L'ultima canzone" (Geolier featuring Giorgia) | 2023 | 40 | FIMI: Gold | Il coraggio dei bambini: Atto II |
| "So Fly" | 2023 | 34 | FIMI: Platinum | Il coraggio dei bambini: Atto II |
| "Hermes" | 2023 | 26 | FIMI: Platinum | Il coraggio dei bambini: Atto II |
| "Pillole" (Tony Effe featuring Sfera Ebbasta and Geolier) | 2023 | 7 | FIMI: Platinum | Icon |
| "Mancanze affettive" (Tedua featuring Geolier) | 2023 | 5 | FIMI: Platinum | La divina commedia |
| "Elicotteri" (Shiva featuring Geolier) | 2023 | 31 | FIMI: Gold | Santana Season |
| "Fantasmi" (Rose Villain featuring Geolier) | 2023 | 41 | FIMI: 2× Platinum | Radio Gotham |
| "Desolé" (Drillionaire featuring Rhove and Geolier) | 2023 | 29 | | 10 |
| "Kiss You (F**k You)" (Yung Snapp featuring Geolier) | 2023 | 34 | FIMI: Platinum | Hotel Montana |
| "Calcolatrici" (Sfera Ebbasta featuring Baby Gang, Geolier and Simba La Rue) | 2023 | 4 | FIMI: Platinum | X2VR |
| "Tanti soldi" (Ghali featuring Geolier) | 2023 | 93 | | Pizza kebab Vol. 1 |
| "Terr1" (Kid Yugi featuring Geolier) | 2024 | 27 | FIMI: Gold | I nomi del diavolo |
| "Personale" (Mahmood featuring Geolier) | 2024 | 24 | FIMI: Platinum | Nei letti degli altri |
| "Perdere 'a capa" (Co'Sang featuring Geolier) | 2024 | 15 | FIMI: Gold | Dinastia |
| "Per sempre" | 2024 | 27 | FIMI: Gold | Dio lo sa |
| "Idee chiare" (featuring Lazza) | 2024 | 17 | FIMI: Gold | Dio lo sa |
| "Si stat' tu" | 2024 | 12 | FIMI: Platinum | Dio lo sa |
| "Io t'o' giur'" (featuring Sfera Ebbasta) | 2024 | 6 | FIMI: Platinum | Dio lo sa |
| "Presidente" | 2024 | 29 | | Dio lo sa |
| "Una come te" | 2024 | 25 | FIMI: Gold | Dio lo sa |
| "Emirates" | 2024 | 19 | FIMI: Gold | Dio lo sa |
| "6 milioni di Euro fa" (Skit) | 2024 | 63 | | Dio lo sa |
| "357" (featuring Guè) | 2024 | 33 | | Dio lo sa |
| "Dio lo sa" | 2024 | 43 | | Dio lo sa |
| "Bella e brutta notizia" (featuring Maria Becerra) | 2024 | 42 | | Dio lo sa |
| "Già lo sai" (featuring Luchè) | 2024 | 44 | | Dio lo sa |
| "Scumpar" | 2024 | 48 | | Dio lo sa |
| "Nu parl, nu sent, nu vec" | 2024 | 32 | FIMI: Gold | Dio lo sa |
| "CLS" (featuring Lele Blade, MV Killa and Yung Snapp) | 2024 | 51 | | Dio lo sa |
| "Finchè non si muore" | 2024 | 74 | | Dio lo sa |
| "Tu ed io" (featuring Rose Villain) | 2024 | 6 | FIMI: Gold | Dio lo sa: Atto II |
| "Ferrari" | 2024 | 95 | FIMI: Gold | Dio lo sa: Atto II |
| "Video hot" (CoCo featuring Geolier) | 2024 | 24 | FIMI: Gold | Mai più forse |
| "Movie" (Guè featuring Geolier) | | 18 | | Tropico del Capricorno |
| "Mea crr" (SLF featuring Geolier) | | 80 | | We The Squad Vol. 2 |
| "Ancora" (Rose Villain featuring Geolier) | 2025 | 29 | | Radio Vega |
| "Pericoloso" (333 Mob featuring Lazza and Geolier) | 2025 | 55 | | Ostil3 |
| "Ginevra" (Luchè featuring Geolier) | 2025 | 1 | FIMI: Platinum | Il mio lato peggiore |
| "Tutto è possibile" (featuring Pino Daniele) | 2026 | 8 | | Tutto è possibile |
| "Sonnambulo" | 2026 | 15 | | Tutto è possibile |
| "2 giorni di fila" (featuring Anna and Sfera Ebbasta) | 2026 | 1 | FIMI: Platinum | Tutto è possibile |
| "Facil facil" | 2026 | 5 | | Tutto è possibile |
| "1H" | 2026 | 6 | FIMI: Gold | Tutto è possibile |
| "Un ricco e un povero" | 2026 | 9 | FIMI: Gold | Tutto è possibile |
| "Olè" (featuring Kid Yugi) | 2026 | 3 | FIMI: Gold | Tutto è possibile |
| "Desiderio" | 2026 | 16 | | Tutto è possibile |
| "P'forz" | 2026 | 24 | | Tutto è possibile |
| "Arcobaleno" (featuring Anuel AA) | 2026 | 2 | FIMI: Gold | Tutto è possibile |
| "A Napoli non piove" | 2026 | 22 | | Tutto è possibile |
| "Bad bad bad" (Shiva featuring Geolier) | 2026 | 2 | FIMI: Platinum | Vangelo |
| "Per emanuele" | 2026 | 15 | | Tutto è possibile: Atto II |
| "Leggenda" | 2026 | 7 | | Tutto è possibile: Atto II |
| "Rione di domenica" | 2026 | 8 | | Tutto è possibile: Atto II |
| "Emanuele e Andrea" (featuring Shiva) | 2026 | 2 | | Tutto è possibile: Atto II |
| "Autorità" | 2026 | 17 | | Tutto è possibile: Atto II |
| "Aspettando il miracolo" | 2026 | 23 | | Tutto è possibile: Atto II |
| "Non sei più tu" (featuring Lazza) | 2026 | 1 | | Tutto è possibile: Atto II |

== Other album appearances ==
List of other guest appearances, with other performing artists, showing year released and album name
| Title | Year | Other performer(s) | Certifications | Album |
|---|---|---|---|---|
| "Vien cu me" | 2019 | Christian Revo | | Talento sprecato |
| "Montecarlo" | 2019 | Emis Killa | | Supereroe Bat Edition |
| "Facc abus" | 2019 | MV Killa | | Giovane killer |
| "Superstar" | 2020 | I Desideri | | 96/97 |
| "Valentino" | 2020 | Vale Lambo | | Come il mare |
| "Resta con me" | 2020 | Samurai Jay | | Lacrime |
| "Troppi soldi" | 2020 | CoCo | | Floridiana |
| "Motel" | 2020 | Peppe Soks | FIMI: Gold | Stella del sud |
| "Luntan a me" | 2020 | MV Killa and Young Snapp | FIMI: Gold | Hours |
| "Tik Tok RMX" | 2021 | Sfera Ebbasta with Marracash, Guè Pequeno and Paky | | Famoso |
| "Serpenti" | 2021 | Lele Blade | | Ambizione |
| "Colpevole RMX" | 2021 | Tony Effe | | Untouchable |
| "Extendo RMX" | 2021 | Lele Blade with Paky and Shiva | | Ambizione |
| "Cypher" | 2022 | SLF | | We the Squad: Vol. 1 |
| "Desaparecidos" | 2022 | Clementino | | Black Pulcinella |
| "Polo" | 2023 | Neves 17 | | Ieri, oggi e domani |
| "E.T.A." | 2023 | Dani Faiv with J Balvin | | Ultimo piano |
| "Non mollare mai 2024" | 2024 | Gigi D'Alessio feat. Guè and Clementino | | Fra |
| "'Na vita annanz" | 2025 | SLF | | We The Squad Vol. 2 |
| "Dire di no" | 2025 | SLF | | We The Squad Vol. 2 |
