= Rose Villain discography =

Discography of Italian singer-songwriter and rapper Rose Villain

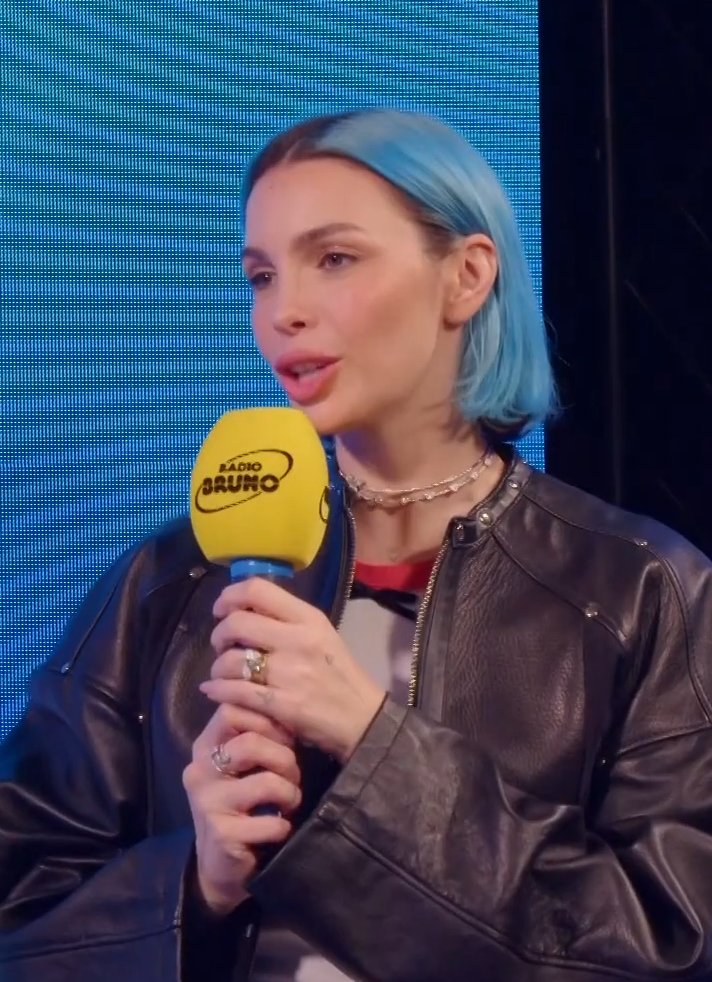
- Rose Villain in February 2025
- Studio albums: 3
- Singles: 31

The discography of Italian singer-songwriter and rapper Rose Villain consists of three studio albums and thirty-seven singles.

== Studio albums ==
List of studio albums, with chart positions and certifications
Title	Album details	Peak chart positions		Certifications
Title	Album details	ITA	SWI	Certifications
Radio Gotham	Released: 20 January 2023; Label: Arista, Columbia, Sony Music Italy; Format: CD, LP, digital download, streaming	5	—	FIMI: Platinum
Radio Sakura	Released: 8 March 2024; Label: Warner Music Italy; Format: CD, LP, digital download, streaming	3	94	FIMI: 2× Platinum
Radio Vega	Released: 14 March 2025; Label: Warner Music Italy; Format: CD, LP, digital download, streaming	1	91	FIMI: Platinum

== Singles ==
=== As lead artist ===
List of singles as lead artist, with peak chart positions, showing year released and album name
Title	Year	Peak chart positions		Certifications	Album
Title	Year	ITA	SWI	Certifications	Album
"Get the Fuck Outta My Pool"	2016	—	—		Non-album singles
"Geisha"	2016	—	—		Non-album singles
"Kitty Kitty"	2017	—	—		Non-album singles
"Don't Call the Po-Po"	2017	—	—		Non-album singles
"Funeral Party"	2018	—	—		Non-album singles
"Swoop!"	2019	—	—		Non-album singles
"Sneakers"	2019	—	—		Non-album singles
"It's Snowing, Motherfucker"	2019	—	—		Non-album singles
"Bundy"	2020	—	—		Non-album singles
"Il diavolo piange"	2020	—	—		Non-album singles
"Goodbye"	2020	—	—		Non-album singles
"Elvis" (featuring Guè and Sixpm)	2021	97	—	FIMI: Gold	Radio Gotham
"Gangsta Love" (featuring Rosa Chemical)	2021	—	—		Non-album single
"Michelle Pfeiffer" (featuring Tony Effe)	2022	32	—	FIMI: Platinum	Radio Gotham
"Rari"	2022	—	—		Radio Gotham
"Lamette" (featuring Salmo)	2023	37	—	FIMI: Gold	Radio Gotham
"Cartoni animati"	2023	—	—		Radio Gotham
"Fragole" (with Achille Lauro)	2023	7	—	FIMI: 3× Platinum	Non-album single
"Io, me ed altri guai"	2023	37	—	FIMI: Platinum	Radio Sakura
"Click Boom!"	2024	8	96	FIMI: 3× Platinum	Radio Sakura
"Come un tuono" (featuring Guè)	2024	1	—	FIMI: 4× Platinum	Radio Sakura
"Ho fatto un sogno" (with Tananai and Madame)	2024	17	—		Non-album singles
"MyLove!" (with SixPM and Ernia featuring SLF)	2024	87	—		Non-album singles
"Fuorilegge"	2025	6	51	FIMI: Platinum	Radio Vega
"Victoria's Secret" (featuring Tony Effe)	2025	24	—		Radio Vega
"Bollicine"	2025	84	—		Radio Vega
"—" denotes a single that did not chart or was not released.

=== As featured artist ===
List of singles as featured artist, with peak chart positions and certifications, showing year released and album name
Title	Year	Peak chart positions	Certifications	Album
Title	Year	ITA	Certifications	Album
"Don Medellín" (Salmo featuring Rose Villain)	2016	13	FIMI: Platinum	Hellvisback
"Chico" (Guè featuring Rose Villain and Luchè)	2020	5	FIMI: 4× Platinum	Mr. Fini
"Soli" (Giaime featuring Rose Villain)	2021	—		Figlio maschio
"Kandisky" (Don Joe featuring Ernia and Rose Villain)	2021	—		Milano soprano
"Eva+Eva" (Annalisa featuring Rose Villain)	2021	—		Non-album single
"Piango sulla Lambo" (Guè featuring Rose Villain)	2021	3	FIMI: Platinum	Guesus
"Blu" (Yosh Whale featuring Rose Villain)	2023	—		A mezz'aria
"Mmh" (Fred De Palma featuring Rose Villain)	2024	32		Non-album single
"Oh mamma mia" (Guè featuring Rose Villain)	2025	1	FIMI: Platinum	Tropico del Capricorno
"—" denotes a single that did not chart or was not released.

== Other charted songs ==
List of other charted songs, with peak chart positions, showing year released and album name
Title	Year	Peak chart positions	Certifications	Album
Title	Year	ITA	Certifications	Album
"Fantasmi" (featuring Geolier)	2023	41	FIMI: 2× Platinum	Radio Gotham
"Due facce" (featuring Tedua)	2023	47	FIMI: Gold	Radio Gotham
"Hattori Hanzo" (featuring Madame)	2024	63		Radio Sakura
"Stan" (featuring Ernia)	2024	36		Radio Sakura
"Graffiti" (featuring Bresh)	2024	81		Radio Sakura
"Brutti pensieri" (featuring Thasup)	2024	93		Radio Sakura
"Il bacio del serpente" (featuring Guè)	2025	88		Radio Vega
"No vabbè" (featuring Lazza)	2025	16		Radio Vega
"Ancora" (featuring Geolier)	2025	29		Radio Vega
"Sbalzi d'amore" (featuring Annalisa)	2025	71		Radio Vega (After Dark)

== Other appearances ==
List of other charted songs, with peak chart positions, showing year released and album name
Title	Year	Peak chart positions	Album
Title	Year	ITA	Album
"Corona Love Story" (Mondo Marcio featuring Rose Villain)	2021	—	My Beautiful Bloody Break Up - Full Circle
"Psycho" (Emis Killa featuring Rose Villain)	2021	89	Keta Music Vol. 3
"Stone Cold Digital" (Dreamshade featuring Rose Villain)	2021	—	A Pale Blue Dot
"Goodfellas" (Fabri Fibra featuring Rose Villain)	2022	14	Caos
"Au Revoir" (Fred De Palma featuring Guè and Rose Villain)	2022	—	PLC Tape 1
"Travesuras RMX" (SLF featuring Rose Villain, MV Killa, Yung Snapp, Vale Lambo and Fred De Palma)	2022	—	We the Squad, Vol. 1 (Summer Edition)
"Cell" (Rondodasosa featuring Rose Villain e Ghali)	2022	89	Trenches Baby
"Canzoni tristi" (Irama featuring Rose Villain)	2022	—	Il giorno in cui ho smesso di pensare (Deluxe Edition)
"Rimpianti" (Carl Brave featuring Rose Villain and Nayt)	2023	—	Migrazione
"Hall of Fame" (Artie 5ive e Rondodasosa feat. Rose Villain)	2023	—	Motivation 4 the Streetz
"Flores y mentiras" (Vale Lambo featuring Rose Villain and Don Pero)	2024	—	Lamborghini a via Marina
"Balenciaga" (Tony Effe featuring Rose Villain)	2024	34	Icon
"Non lo sai" (La Sad featuring Rose Villain)	2024	—	Odio La Sad
"Killer" (Finley featuring Rose Villain)	2024	—	Pogo Mixtape Vol. 1
"Tu ed io" (Geolier featuring Rose Villain)	2024	6	Dio lo sa - Atto II
"Money on My Mind" (Jake La Furia featuring Rose Villain and Artie 5ive)	2025	23	Fame
"I miei occhi erano i tuoi" (Chiello featuring Rose Villain)	2025	—	Scarabocchi
"Un milione di mani" (Luchè featuring Rose Villain)	2025	29	Il mio lato peggiore
"Fuori di me" (Icy Subzero featuring Rose Villain)	2025	—	Anno zero
"Non in vendita" (Sick Luke featuring Nayt e Rose Villain)	2025	69	Dopamina
"Dietro lo store" (Paky featuring Rose Villain)	2025	49	Gloria
"—" denotes a song that did not chart or was not released.
