= List of number-one hits of 2026 (Italy) =

This is a list of the number-one hits of 2026 on Italy's Singles and Albums Charts, ranked by the Federazione Industria Musicale Italiana (FIMI).

== Chart history ==
List of number-one songs and albums
Week	Song	Artist(s)	Ref.	Album	Artist(s)	Ref.
1	"L'amore non mi basta"	Emma		Tutta vita (sempre)	Olly	
2	"Phantom"	Geolier featuring 50 Cent		Trauma	Tony Boy	
3	"End of Beginning"	Djo		Fastlife 5: Audio Luxury	Guè and Cookin' Soul	
4	"2 giorni di fila"	Geolier featuring Sfera Ebbasta and Anna		Tutto è possibile	Geolier	
5	"2 giorni di fila"	Geolier featuring Sfera Ebbasta and Anna		Tutto è possibile	Geolier	
6	"La violenza necessaria"	Kid Yugi and Shiva		Anche gli eroi muoiono	Kid Yugi	
7	"DTMF"	Bad Bunny		Anche gli eroi muoiono	Kid Yugi	
8	"Darkmoney"	Pyrex and Sfera Ebbasta		Anche gli eroi muoiono	Kid Yugi	
9	"Male necessario"	Fedez and Marco Masini		Anche gli eroi muoiono	Kid Yugi	
10	"Ossessione"	Samurai Jay and Vito Salamanca		Anche gli eroi muoiono	Kid Yugi	
11	"Ossessione"	Samurai Jay and Vito Salamanca		Kiss All the Time. Disco, Occasionally.	Harry Styles	
12	"Ossessione"	Samurai Jay and Vito Salamanca		Crack musica II	Tony Effe and Side Baby	
13	"Ossessione"	Samurai Jay and Vito Salamanca		Io individuo	Nayt	
14	"Ossessione"	Samurai Jay and Vito Salamanca		Io individuo	Nayt	
15	"Ossessione"	Samurai Jay and Vito Salamanca		Hellvisback 10 Years Later	Salmo	
16	"Ossessione"	Samurai Jay and Vito Salamanca		Vangelo	Shiva	
17	"Ossessione"	Samurai Jay and Vito Salamanca		Vangelo	Shiva	
18	"Ossessione"	Samurai Jay and Vito Salamanca		Vangelo	Shiva	
19	"Ossessione"	Samurai Jay and Vito Salamanca		Vangelo	Shiva	
20	"Ossessione"	Samurai Jay and Vito Salamanca		Santissimo	Sayf	
21	"Ossessione"	Samurai Jay and Vito Salamanca		Vangelo	Shiva	
22	"Ossessione"	Samurai Jay and Vito Salamanca		Ryan Ted	Tedua	
23	"Ossessione"	Samurai Jay and Vito Salamanca		Vangelo	Shiva	
24	"Ossessione"	Samurai Jay and Vito Salamanca		Vangelo	Shiva	
25	"Ossessione"	Samurai Jay and Vito Salamanca		You Seem Pretty Sad for a Girl So in Love	Olivia Rodrigo	
26	"Ossessione"	Samurai Jay and Vito Salamanca		Il giorno che aspettavo	Ultimo	
27	"Ossessione"	Samurai Jay and Vito Salamanca		Il giorno che aspettavo	Ultimo	
28	"La testa gira"	Fred De Palma, Anitta and Emis Killa		Confessions II	Madonna	
29	"La testa gira"	Fred De Palma, Anitta and Emis Killa		Million Dollar Babe	Anna	
30	"Dai Dai"	Shakira and Burna Boy		Million Dollar Babe	Anna	
31	"Dai Dai"	Shakira and Burna Boy		Tutto è possibile	Geolier	
32	"Dai Dai"	Shakira and Burna Boy		Petal	Ariana Grande	
33	"Dai Dai"	Shakira and Burna Boy		This & That	Stray Kids	
34	"La testa gira"	Fred De Palma, Anitta and Emis Killa		Tutto è possibile	Geolier	
35	"La testa gira"	Fred De Palma, Anitta and Emis Killa		Tutto è possibile	Geolier	
36	"Bugie"	Shiva		Tutto è possibile	Geolier	
37	"La testa gira"	Fred De Palma, Anitta and Emis Killa		Tutto è possibile	Geolier	
38	"Per noi"	Geolier featuring Achille Lauro		Tutto è possibile	Geolier	
39	"Lontano"	Sfera Ebbasta		Miria	22Simba	
40	"Lontano"	Sfera Ebbasta		Miria	22Simba	
41	"Lontano"	Sfera Ebbasta		Tutto è possibile	Geolier	
42	"Lontano"	Sfera Ebbasta		Zarathustra Style	Fabri Fibra, Neffa and Zarathustra	
43	"Non sei più tu"	Geolier featuring Lazza		Tutto è possibile – atto II	Geolier	
44	"Non sei più tu"	Geolier featuring Lazza		Amateur	Cesare Cremonini	
45	"Sentire la musica"	Kid Yugi		Anche gli eroi muoiono post mortem	Kid Yugi	
46	"Sentire la musica"	Kid Yugi		Cura	Tony Boy	
47	"Sentire la musica"	Kid Yugi		Carnaval de Luz	U2	

== See also ==
- 2026 in music
- List of number-one hits in Italy
