= Michelle Pfeiffer (disambiguation) =

Michelle Pfeiffer (born 1958) is an American actress.

Michelle Pfeiffer may also refer to:

- "Michelle Pfeiffer" (Ethel Cain song), 2021
- "Michelle Pfeiffer" (Rose Villain song), 2022
