= Canzone d'amore =

Canzone d'amore may refer to:

- Love Song (Canzone d'amore), 1954 Italian musical film directed by Giorgio Simonelli
- Canzone d'Amore, 1989 studio album by Kikki Danielsson
- "Canzone d'amore" (song), 2026 song by Geolier
