= Inbred (disambiguation) =

Inbred means produced by inbreeding.

It may also refer to:

- Inbred, an insult
- The Inbreds, a rock band
- Inbred (film), a horror film
- Inbred (EP), an extended play by Ethel Cain
- Inbred Mountain, an album by Buckethead
