= Per noi (song) =

2026 single by Geolier featuring Achille Lauro

Single by Geolier featuring Achille Lauro

from the album Tutto è possibile
- Released: 11 September 2026
- Length: 3:50
- Label: Atlantic; Warner
- Producer: Sottomarino

Geolier singles chronology
"1H" (2026)	"Per noi" (2026)	"Winner" (2026)

Achille Lauro singles chronology
"La città degli angeli" (2026)	"Per noi" (2026)	"Esibizionista" (2026)

Music video
- "Per noi" on YouTube

"Per noi" (transl. For Us) is a song by Italian rapper Geolier, featuring Italian singer-songwriter Achille Lauro. It was released on 11 September 2026 as a single from the deluxe edition of Geolier's fourth studio album, Tutto è possibile. The song was produced by Vincenzo Marino, known professionally as Sottomarino, while the lyrics were written by Geolier, Lauro, Davide Petrella, and Marino.

The collaboration followed Lauro's appearance as a guest at Geolier's concert at the Stadio Olimpico in Rome on 19 June 2026, where the two performed "Fotografia".

It debuted at number one on the Italian Albums Chart.

== Music video ==
The music video, directed by Cesare Cesarano, was released on Geolier's YouTube channel on the same day of the single.

== Charts ==
Weekly chart performance for "Per noi"
Chart (2026)	Peak position
Italy (FIMI)	1
