= Episodio d'amore =

Single by Geolier

from the album Dio lo sa
- Released: 16 August 2024
- Genre: Pop rap
- Length: 3:16
- Label: Warner Music Italy
- Songwriters: Emanuele Palumbo; Federica Abbate; Davide Totaro; Luca Faraone; Alessandro Merli; Fabio Clemente
- Producers: Dat Boi Dee; Takagi & Ketra

Geolier singles chronology
| "Limit Yok" (2024) | "Episodio d'amore" (2024) | "Mai per sempre" (2024) |

Music video
- "Episodio d'amore" on YouTube

"Episodio d'amore" (transl. Love episode) is a song by Italian rapper Geolier. It was released on 16 August 2024 by Warner Music Italy as the fifth single from his third studio album, Dio lo sa.

== Description ==
The song was written by the rapper himself with Federica Abbate, Luca Faraone, Davide Totaro, aka Dat Boi Dee, and by Takagi & Ketra, a duo composed of Alessandro Merli and Fabio Clemente, who also handled the production with Dat Boi Dee.

== Charts ==
=== Weekly charts ===
Weekly chart performance for "Episodio d'amore"
| Chart (2024) | Peak position |
|---|---|
| Italy (FIMI) | 11 |
| Italy Airplay (EarOne) | 27 |

=== Year-end charts ===
2024 year-end chart performance for "Episodio d'amore"
| Chart (2024) | Position |
|---|---|
| Italy (FIMI) | 37 |

== Certifications ==
Certifications for "Episodio d'amore"
| Region | Certification | Certified units/sales |
|---|---|---|
| Italy (FIMI) | 2× Platinum | 200,000^{‡} |
^{‡} Sales+streaming figures based on certification alone.
