= Mai per sempre =

Single by Geolier

from the album Dio lo sa – Atto II
- Released: 20 November 2024
- Genre: Urban
- Length: 3:40
- Label: Warner Music Italy
- Songwriters: Emanuele Palumbo; Davide Petrella; Dario Faini
- Producer: Dardust

Geolier singles chronology
"Episodio d'amore" (2024)	"Mai per sempre" (2024)	"Fotografia" (2025)

Music video
- "Mai per sempre" on YouTube

"Mai per sempre" (transl. Never forever) is a song by Italian rapper Geolier. It was released on 20 November 2024 by Warner Music Italy as the lead single from the reissue of his third studio album, Dio lo sa, subtitled Atto II.

The song features co-writing contribution by Davide Petrella and Dario Faini and reached number 8 on the Italian singles chart.

== Description ==
The song was written by the rapper himself with Dario Faini, aka Dardust, who also handled the production. Musically, it has a moderate tempo of 115 beats per minute and is in the key of C major.

== Promotion ==
The song's release date was revealed on 18 November together with Amadeus during a live broadcast on the artist's Instagram profile, where the two drove through the city of Naples and also gave a preview of the song.

== Charts ==
Weekly chart performance for "Mai per sempre"
Chart (2024)	Peak position
Italy (FIMI)	8
Italy Airplay (EarOne)	30

== Certifications ==
Certifications for "Mai per sempre"
Region	Certification	Certified units/sales
Italy (FIMI)	Gold	100,000^{‡}
^{‡} Sales+streaming figures based on certification alone.
