= Oh mamma mia =

Single by Guè featuring Rose Villain

from the album Tropico del Capricorno
- Released: 10 January 2025
- Genre: Hip hop
- Length: 2:48
- Label: Island; Universal
- Songwriters: Cosimo Fini; Rosa Luini; Vincenzo Liguori; Andrea Ferrara; Fabio Campedelli; Pietro Miano; Pino Daniele
- Producers: Sixpm; Pietro Miano

Guè singles chronology
"Two Seater" (2024)	"Oh mamma mia" (2025)	"La mia parola" (2025)

Rose Villain singles chronology
"Dammi un senso alla fine" (2024)	"Oh mamma mia" (2025)	"Fuorilegge" (2025)

Music video
- "Oh mamma mia" on YouTube

"Oh mamma mia" is a song by Italian rapper Guè with featured vocals by Italian singer-songwriter Rose Villain. It was released on 10 January 2025 by Island and Universal as the lead single from Guè's ninth album, Tropico del Capricorno. It topped the Italian Singles Chart.

The song pays hommage to Pino Daniele using a sample of his song "Che soddisfazione".

== Music video ==
The music video for "Oh mamma mia", directed by Marc Lucas and Igor Grbesic, was released on the same day via Guè's YouTube channel. It was shot in the Quartieri Spagnoli in Naples.

== Charts ==
=== Weekly charts ===
Weekly chart performance for "Oh mamma mia"
Chart (2025)	Peak position
Italy (FIMI)	1
Italy Airplay (EarOne)	5

=== Year-end charts ===
Year-end chart performance for "Oh mamma mia"
Chart (2025)	Position
Italy (FIMI)	35

== Certifications ==
Certifications for "Oh mamma mia"
Region	Certification	Certified units/sales
Italy (FIMI)	Platinum	200,000^{‡}
^{‡} Sales+streaming figures based on certification alone.
