= Crush (Ethel Cain song) =

2021 single by Ethel Cain

Single by Ethel Cain

from the EP Inbred
- Released: March 18, 2021
- Length: 3:24
- Label: Daughters of Cain
- Songwriter: Hayden Silas Anhedönia
- Producer: Ethel Cain

Ethel Cain singles chronology
| "Michelle Pfeiffer" (2021) | "Crush" (2021) | "Gibson Girl" (2022) |

Music video
- "Crush" on YouTube

"Crush" is a song recorded, written, and produced by American singer-songwriter Ethel Cain. It was released on March 18, 2021, as the second single from her third EP, Inbred. A love song about an older person with a violent streak, it marked an approach by the singer towards a more pop sound. An official music video for "Crush" premiered on August 3, 2021. A stripped version of the track was released alongside an alternative video on August 24, 2021. Cain performed "Crush" at several events and included it on the regular set list of the Childish Behaviour Tour in 2024.

== Background and release ==
Hayden Silas Anhedönia, under the moniker Ethel Cain, started 2021 by releasing the single "Michelle Pfeiffer" and announcing her third extended play, Inbred. A month after, she announced and released the second single, "Crush". A self-directed visualizer was published alongside the song. A music video for the song was released on August 3, 2021. She directed it along with her sister, Salem. "We just ran around our house and the little town we lived in for three days and shot some fun footage that I felt matched the vibe of the song", said the singer. She also stated that she wanted to make a video "as experimental as 'Crush' was musically".

A stripped version of the song was released on August 24, 2021. The music video for the song, directed by Anhedönia and shot by her sister, sees Cain joined by Dan Geraghty of Twenty One Pilots on a trampoline, being filmed on a home-movie style. "Crush" was included on several set lists of Cain's live performances, including her first headlining concert in New York City, the Primavera Sound festival in Madrid, and the Childish Behaviour Tour in 2024.

== Music and lyrics ==
Cain wrote "Crush" in 20 minutes. It is a love song for a "bad boy" by "see[ing] some light in all the darkness", with allusions to addictions and gun violence present in the United States. According to Pitchfork, the lyrics of the track presents "an introspective and moody teenager fawning over a boy with a violent streak". Although it was labeled by Cain as experimental, "Crush" is closer to pop music than her usual alternative style. She talked about her "fear" of making pop music, saying that "once you make [the genre], your other genres won't be taken as seriously", but "she has worked to make the music she wants".

In a press release about the theme of the song, the artist said:

I really had no business at 16 having week-long relationships with random 23-year-old drifter students but at the time I just thought they were so cool. You know, the deadbeat stoner skater boys who definitely weren't making it over the county line. It was out of total innocence that I ever envisioned a future with them but damn it if I didn't daydream about them all the same. Good men die too, and all that.

== Critical reception ==
The Fader's staff included "Crush" on their list of 20 best rock music releases of March 2021. They described it as a "nuanced and grungy love song written from the rearview mirror of adulthood". The same magazine also named the song one of the 100 best songs of 2021, placing it at number 11, and Colin Joyce described its lyrics as "myth-making", with "the sort of detail that emerges in a documentary about a forgotten artist decades later". Coup de Main Magazine also included the track on its year-end list of best songs. "Crush" was highlighted as a standout release by magazine Nylon.
