= Amen (Geolier song) =

Single by Geolier

from the album Tutto è possibile
- Released: 19 January 2026
- Genre: Hip hop
- Length: 2:41
- Label: Atlantic Italy; Warner Music Italy
- Songwriters: Emanuele Palumbo; Enrico Esposito; Lorenzo Biscione
- Producer: Voga

Geolier singles chronology
"Canzone d'amore" (2026)	"Amen" (2026)	"Stelle" (2026)

Music video
- "Amen" on YouTube

"Amen" is a song by Italian rapper Geolier. It was released on 19 January 2026 by Atlantic Italy and Warner Music Italy and included in the digital reissue of his fourth studio album, Tutto è possibile.

== Description ==
The song, written by the rapper himself and produced by Voga, a duo composed of Rico and Sneikinthewaves, was originally released as a freestyle on 19 October 2025.

== Music video ==
The music video, directed by Element Video, was released on 19 October 2025 through the Geolier's YouTube channel.

== Charts ==
Weekly chart performance for "Amen"
Chart (2026)	Peak position
Italy (FIMI)	47
