= Una vita fa =

Single by Geolier featuring Shiva

from the album Dio lo sa
- Released: 7 June 2024
- Genre: Pop; urban
- Length: 2:51
- Label: Warner Music Italy
- Songwriters: Emanuele Palumbo; Andrea Arrigoni; Domenico Di Nardo; Luca Ghiazzi; Simone Benussi
- Producers: MACE; Shune

Geolier singles chronology
"Senza tuccà" (2024)	"Una vita fa" (2024)	"Limit Yok" (2024)

Shiva singles chronology
"First Day Out" (2024)	"Una vita fa" (2024)	"Take 5" (2024)

Music video
- "Una vita fa" on YouTube

"Una vita fa" (transl. A lifetime ago) is a song by Italian rapper Geolier with featured vocals by Italian rapper Shiva. It was released on 16 August 2024 by Warner Music Italy as the fourth single from Geolier's third studio album, Dio lo sa.

== Description ==
The single features Italian rapper Shiva, following his collaboration on songs such as "Un altro show" and "Everyday". It was written by the two artists along with Mace and Shune, who also produced it.

The song is about a long-standing, painful love and the search for a sense of peace and happiness. Indeed, when the two lovers are together, they face constant difficulties and temptations, and thus realize that, despite their efforts, their relationship isn't working because one of them always wants more.

Musically, the song is rhythmic and features a funk coda. It is composed at a fast tempo of 86 beats per minute and in the key of C-sharp minor.

== Charts ==
Weekly chart performance for "Una vita fa"
Chart (2024)	Peak position
Italy (FIMI)	23
Italy Airplay (EarOne)	26

== Certifications ==
Certifications for "Una vita fa"
Region	Certification	Certified units/sales
Italy (FIMI)	Gold	50,000^{‡}
^{‡} Sales+streaming figures based on certification alone.
