= Radio Gotham =

Studio album by Rose Villain
- Released: 20 January 2023
- Recorded: 2021–2022
- Genre: Hip hop; pop rap
- Length: 38:10
- Language: Italian; English
- Label: Sony Music Italy; Columbia
- Producer: Sixpm; Drillionaire; HDNRC; Young Miles; Stevie Aiello; Zef

Rose Villain chronology
Radio Gotham (2023)	Radio Sakura (2024)

Singles from Radio Gotham
- 1. "Elvis" Released: 2 July 2021; 2. "Michelle Pfeiffer" Released: 13 May 2022; 3. "Rari" Released: 7 October 2022; 4. "Lamette" Released: 11 January 2023; 5. "Cartoni animati" Released: 14 April 2023

Radio Gotham is the debut studio album by Italian singer-songwriter and rapper Rose Villain, released on 20 January 2023 by Sony Music. The project was anticipated by the singles "Elvis", "Michelle Pfeiffer" and "Rari" released between 2021 and 2022, while on 11 January 2023 Villain released the promotional single "Lamette" featuring Italian rapper Salmo.

== Background ==
In 2019 Rose Villain ended her record deal with Republic Records, after 3 years spent to release music mainly in English language. At the end of 2019, she went back to Milan and started to work on new music, this time around even in Italian language, thanks to Italian rapper Gué Pequeno, who, after listened to the English version of "Chico", who was meant to be Rose's single with Republic Records, pushed her to translate the song in Italian and asked her if he could use it for his 2020 album Mr. Fini. "Chico" ended up to be one of the best selling singles in Italy, opening a lot of doors for Villain's into Italian hip hop music world. In 2020, Villain signed a record deal with Sony Music Italy/Arista. She started to release music in Italian language and in 2021, again with Gué, she released "Elvis", which is the first single from Radio Gotham. In 2022, she released "Michelle Pfeiffer", who became viral on TikTok and was certified platinum by FIMI. This single motivated her to putting together an album, that was finally announced in December 2023.

== Track listing ==
Radio Gotham track listing
No.	Title	Lyrics	Music	Producer(s)	Length
1.	"Dalle ombre"	Rosa Luini	Andrea Ferrara	Sixpm	2:36
2.	"Gotham"	Luini	Ferrara	Sixpm	2:33
3.	"Lamette" (featuring Salmo)	Luini; Maurizio Pisciottu	Ferrara; Stefano Tognini; Lorenzo Paolo Spinosa; Nicolò Pucciarmati	Sixpm; Zef	2:29
4.	"Non sono felice per te"	Luini	Ferrara; Tognini; Pucciarmati	Sixpm; Miles; Zef	2:39
5.	"Due facce" (featuring Tedua)	Luini; Mario Molinari	Ferrara; Stephen Aiello	Sixpm; Stevie Aiello	2:34
6.	"Moonlight"	Luini	Diego Vincenzo Vettraino	Sixpm; Drillionaire	2:30
7.	"Rari"	Luini	Ferrara; Hendric Buenck	Sixpm; HDNRC	2:48
8.	"Fantasmi" (featuring Geolier)	Luini; Emanuele Palumbo	Ferrara	Sixpm	2:13
9.	"Rehab" (featuring Carl Brave)	Luini; Carlo Luigi Coraggio	Ferrara	Sipxm	3:12
10.	"Yakuza"	Luini	Ferrara	Sixpm	2:43
11.	"Monet" (featuring Elisa)	Luini; Elisa Toffoli	Ferrara	Sixpm	3:17
12.	"Michelle Pfeiffer" (featuring Tony Effe)	Luini; Nicolò Rapisarda	Ferrara	Sixpm	3:00
13.	"Cartoni animati"	Luini	Ferrara	Sixpm	2:44
14.	"Elvis" (featuring Guè)	Luini; Cosimo Fini; Mae Boren Axton; Tommy Durden; Elvis Presley	Ferrara; Axton; Durden; Presley	Sixpm	2:52
Total length:					38:10

== Charts ==
Chart performance for Radio Gotham
Chart (2023)	Peak position
Italian Albums (FIMI)	5

== Certifications ==
Certifications for Radio Gotham
Region	Certification	Certified units/sales
Italy (FIMI)	Platinum	50,000^{‡}
^{‡} Sales+streaming figures based on certification alone.
