= Inbred (EP) =

2021 EP by Ethel Cain

- Standard cover

EP by Ethel Cain
- Released: April 23, 2021
- Genres: Americana; ambient-folk; slowcore
- Length: 31:46
- Label: Daughters of Cain (via AWAL)
- Producers: Ethel Cain; Lil Aaron; Kora Puckett

Ethel Cain chronology
Golden Age (2019)	Inbred (2021)	Preacher's Daughter (2022)

Alternative cover
- Initial physical release cover

Singles from Inbred
- 1. "Michelle Pfeiffer" Released: February 11, 2021; 2. "Crush" Released: March 18, 2021

Inbred is the third extended play by American singer-songwriter and record producer Ethel Cain. It was released on April 23, 2021, through her independent record label Daughters of Cain.

== Background and release ==
Since 2017, the singer began releasing demos of songs under different monikers, such as White Silas, a name under which she had released five projects on streaming platforms: Colossus (2017), Arcane Vessels (2018), Sad Music for Sad People (2018), Nightmares (2018) and Mourning After (2019), the latter two being in collaboration with musician Little Triste.

In 2019, she released her first two extended plays under the stage name Ethel Cain: Carpet Bed and Golden Age, in September and December respectively. Following those releases, Cain began collaborating with Lil Aaron and signed with Prescription Songs. In February 2021, Cain released her first single under the new publishing contract, titled "Michelle Pfeiffer" featuring Lil Aaron. The song was premiered in Paper and featured on Billboard, The Fader, Nylon, and Pitchfork. The second single from the EP, titled "Crush", was released on March 18. A music video for the song was published in August.

== Reception ==
Arielle Gordon, writing for Pitchfork, gave this release a 7.6 out of 10, for adding "nuance and depth to both her sound and her character"; this album builds upon the mythology of the Ethel Cain pseudonym as well as adds new sounds to her musical repertoire.

== Track listing ==
Inbred digital track listing
No.	Title	Writer(s)	Producer(s)	Length
1.	"Michelle Pfeiffer" (with Lil Aaron)	Hayden Silas Anhedönia; Aaron Puckett; Kora Puckett	Lil Aaron; Kora Puckett	4:34
2.	"Crush"	Anhedönia	Ethel Cain	3:27
3.	"God's Country" (with Wicca Phase Springs Eternal)	Anhedönia; Adam McIlwee	Ethel Cain	8:17
4.	"Unpunishable"	Anhedönia	Ethel Cain	4:24
5.	"Inbred"	Anhedönia	Ethel Cain	4:50
6.	"Two-Headed Mother"	Anhedönia	Ethel Cain	6:14
Total length:				31:46

Inbred CD edition bonus tracks
No.	Title	Writer(s)	Producer(s)	Length
7.	"Crying During Sex"	Anhedönia	Ethel Cain	5:28
8.	"Earnhardt"	Anhedönia	Ethel Cain	4:24
9.	"Age of Delilah"	Anhedönia	Ethel Cain	4:15
10.	"Michelle Pfeiffer" (solo version)	Anhedönia; A. Puckett; K. Puckett	Ethel Cain; Lil Aaron; Kora Puckett	4:35
Total length:				50:28

== Charts ==
Chart performance for Inbred
Chart (2026)	Peak position
Australian Albums (ARIA)	22
Croatian International Albums (HDU)	26
Dutch Albums (Album Top 100)	62
Hungarian Physical Albums (MAHASZ)	17
Irish Independent Albums (IRMA)	15
Polish Albums (ZPAV)	90
Scottish Albums (Official Charts)	12
Swedish Albums (Sverigetopplistan)	54
UK Albums Sales (OCC)	20
UK Independent Albums (Official Charts)	5
US Top Album Sales (Billboard)	34

== Release history ==
Release dates and formats for Inbred
Region	Date	Format	Label	Ref.
Various	April 23, 2021	Digital download; Streaming	Daughters of Cain	
Various	August 20, 2021	CD; Cassette	Daughters of Cain	
Various	April 18, 2026	LP record	Daughters of Cain	
