= Fuorilegge =

Single by Rose Villain

from the album Radio Vega
- Language: Italian
- Released: 12 February 2025
- Genre: Dance pop
- Length: 3:41
- Label: Warner
- Songwriters: Rosa Luini; Federica Abbate; Andrea Ferrara; Nicola Lazzarin
- Producers: Sixpm; Cripo; okgiorgio

Rose Villain singles chronology
"Oh mamma mia" (2025)	"Fuorilegge" (2025)	"Victoria's Secret" (2025)

Music video
- "Fuorilegge" on YouTube

"Fuorilegge" (transl. "Outlaw") is a 2025 song co-written and recorded by Italian singer-songwriter Rose Villain, released by Warner on 12 February 2025 as the lead single from her third studio album, Radio Vega. It competed in the Sanremo Music Festival 2025, placing 19th.

== Music video ==
The music video of "Fuorilegge", directed by Attilio Cusani, was released on 12 February 2025 via Rose Villain's YouTube channel.

== Charts ==
=== Weekly charts ===
Weekly chart performance for "Fuorilegge"
Chart (2025)	Peak position
Italy (FIMI)	6
Italy Airplay (EarOne)	10
Switzerland (Schweizer Hitparade)	51

=== Year-end charts ===
Year-end chart performance for "Fuorilegge"
Chart (2025)	Position
Italy (FIMI)	24

== Certifications ==
Certifications for "Fuorilegge"
Region	Certification	Certified units/sales
Italy (FIMI)	Platinum	200,000^{‡}
^{‡} Sales+streaming figures based on certification alone.
