= 081 (song) =

Single by Geolier

from the album Tutto è possibile
- Released: 5 December 2025
- Genre: Pop rap
- Length: 2:55
- Label: Atlantic Italy; Warner Music Italy
- Songwriters: Emanuele Palumbo; Gennaro Petito; Vincenzo Marino
- Producers: Poison Beatz; Sottomarino

Geolier singles chronology
"Fotografia" (2025)	"081" (2025)	"Phantom" (2025)

Music video
- "081" on YouTube

"081" is a song by Italian rapper Geolier. It was released on 5 December 2025 by Atlantic Italy and Warner Music Italy as the second single from his fourth studio album, Tutto è possibile.

== Description ==
The song, written by the rapper himself, is produced by Gennaro Petito, aka Poison Beatz, and Vincenzo Marino, aka Sottomarino.

== Music video ==
The music video, directed by Davide Vicari, was released on the Geolier's YouTube channel to coincide with the song's release.

== Charts ==
Weekly chart performance for "081"
Chart (2025)	Peak position
Italy (FIMI)	3

== Certifications ==
Certifications for "081"
Region	Certification	Certified units/sales
Italy (FIMI)	Gold	100,000^{‡}
^{‡} Sales+streaming figures based on certification alone.
