= Click Boom! =

- Official cover

Single by Rose Villain

from the album Radio Sakura
- Released: 7 February 2024
- Genre: Electropop
- Length: 3:45
- Label: Warner
- Songwriters: Rosa Luini; Davide Petrella; Andrea Ferrara
- Producer: Sixpm

Rose Villain singles chronology
"Blu" (2023)	"Click Boom!" (2024)	"Come un tuono" (2024)

Music video
- "Click Boom!" on YouTube

"Click Boom!" is a song co-written and recorded by Italian singer Rose Villain. It was released on 7 February 2024 by Warner Music Italy as the second single from her sophomore studio album Radio Sakura.

The song served as Villain's entry for the Sanremo Music Festival 2024, the 74th edition of Italy's musical festival that doubles also as a selection of the act for the Eurovision Song Contest, where it placed 23rd out of 30 in the final rank.

== Music video ==
The music video for "Click Boom!", directed by Andrea Folino, was released on the same day via Rose Villain's YouTube channel.

== Charts ==
=== Weekly charts ===
Weekly chart performance for "Click Boom!"
Chart (2024)	Peak position
Italy (FIMI)	8
Italy Airplay (EarOne)	14
Switzerland (Schweizer Hitparade)	96

=== Year-end charts ===
2024 year-end chart performance for "Click Boom!"
Chart (2024)	Position
Italy (FIMI)	10

== Certifications ==
Region	Certification	Certified units/sales
Italy (FIMI)	3× Platinum	300,000^{‡}
^{‡} Sales+streaming figures based on certification alone.
