= Radio Sakura =

Studio album by Rose Villain
- Released: 8 March 2024
- Recorded: 2023–2024
- Genre: Pop; hip hop; rock
- Length: 33:19
- Language: Italian; English
- Label: Warner Music Italy
- Producer: Sixpm; Shea; Smoko Ono; Mr. Monkey; Cripo; thasup; okgiorgio

Rose Villain chronology
Radio Gotham (2023)	Radio Sakura (2024)	Radio Vega (2025)

Singles from Radio Sakura
- 1. "Io, me ed altri guai" Released: 6 October 2023; 2. "Click Boom!" Released: 7 February 2024; 3. "Come un tuono" Released: 29 March 2024

Radio Sakura is the second studio album by Italian singer-songwriter Rose Villain, released on 8 March 2024.

== Background ==
On 20 January 2024, exactly one year after the release of her debut album, Radio Gotham, Rose Villain announced the release of her second studio album, Radio Sakura.

The album was preceded by the singles "Io, me ed altri guai", released on 7 October 2023, and "Click Boom!", with which the singer competed at the Sanremo Music Festival 2024. Following the album's release, "Come un tuono" featuring Guè achieved virality on TikTok and reached the top five of the Italian singles chart, ahead of its release as the album's third single on 29 March 2024.

Radio Sakura debuted at number 2 on the Spotify global album debuts chart.

== Track listing ==
Radio Sakura track listing
No.	Title	Lyrics	Music	Producer(s)	Length
1.	"Hattori Hanzo" (featuring Madame)	Rosa Luini; Francesca Calearo; Andrea Ferrara; Davide Rossi; Emiliano Shehaj	Luini; Ferrara; Rossi; Shehaj; Indyah McAllister; Liam McAllister	Sixpm; Shea; INDYAH	2:46
2.	"Click Boom!"	Luini; Davide Petrella	Ferrara	Sixpm	3:45
3.	"Stan" (featuring Ernia)	Luini; Matteo Professione; Ferrara; Joshua Darian Garzia	Luini; Ferrara; Garzia	Sixpm; Smoko Ono	2:28
4.	"Huh?"	Luini; Ferrara	Luini; Ferrara; Saulo Duarte	Sixpm	2:04
5.	"Graffiti" (featuring Bresh)	Luini; Andrea Brasi; Ferrara; Andrea Evangelisti; Kodie Shantil Marr	Luini; Brasi; Ferrara; Evangelisti; Marr	Sixpm	2:47
6.	"Il mio funerale"	Luini	Luini; Matteo Novi; Ferrara	Sixpm; Mr. Monkey	2:35
7.	"Brutti pensieri" (featuring thasup)	Luini; Davide Mattei; Ferrara; Nicola Lazzarin	Luini; Mattei; Ferrara; Lazzarin; Jacopo Porporino	Sixpm; thasup; Cripo	3:07
8.	"Hai mai visto piangere un cowboy?"	Luini	Luini; Ferrara	Sixpm	2:29
9.	"Trasparente"	Luini	Luini; Ferrara	Sipxm	2:31
10.	"Come un tuono" (featuring Guè)	Luini; Cosimo Fini; Petrella	Luini; Petrella; Ferrara; Pesenti	Sixpm; okgiorgio	2:55
11.	"Io, me ed altri guai"	Luini; Paolo Antonacci	Luini; Ferrara; Edward Cornelius Dobb	Sixpm	2:47
12.	"Milano almeno tu"	Luini	Ferrara	Sixpm	2:52
Total length:					33:19

== Charts ==
=== Weekly charts ===
Weekly chart performance for Radio Sakura
Chart (2024)	Peak position
Italian Albums (FIMI)	3
Swiss Albums (Schweizer Hitparade)	94

=== Year-end charts ===
Year-end chart performance for Radio Sakura
Chart (2024)	Position
Italian Albums (FIMI)	11

== Certifications ==
Certifications for Radio Sakura
Region	Certification	Certified units/sales
Italy (FIMI)	2× Platinum	100,000^{‡}
^{‡} Sales+streaming figures based on certification alone.
