= Michelle Pfeiffer (Ethel Cain song) =

2021 single by Ethel Cain featuring Lil Aaron

Single by Ethel Cain featuring Lil Aaron

from the EP Inbred
- Released: February 11, 2021
- Genre: Indie rock
- Length: 4:31
- Label: Daughters of Cain
- Songwriters: Hayden Silas Anhedönia; Aaron Jennings Puckett; Kora Puckett
- Producers: Lil Aaron; Kora Puckett

Ethel Cain singles chronology
"Michelle Pfeiffer" (2021)	"Crush" (2021)

Audio video
- "Michelle Pfeiffer" on YouTube

"Michelle Pfeiffer" is a song by the American singer-songwriter Ethel Cain featuring the American rapper Lil Aaron from the former's third extended play (EP), Inbred (2021). The song was written by Cain, Lil Aaron, and Kora Puckett; the latter two assisted in its production. It was released, along with a visualizer, through Cain's own Daughters of Cain record label on February 11, 2021, as the EP's lead single. Lil Aaron introduced Cain to the publishing company Prescription Songs and the two recorded the song in a Los Angeles studio.

Titled after the actress of the same name, "Michelle Pfeiffer" is an indie rock track about doomed lovers consumed by their desire. It also discusses the cinematic scope of Los Angeles and the broader Western United States, including guitars and drums into its soundscape. Lil Aaron's verse reflects on his thoughts of dying in a car accident. Upon its release, the song garnered positive reception from music critics; Pitchfork considered it one of the best songs of 2021, and the song received further approval from The Line of Best Fit and The Fader.

== Background and release ==
Ethel Cain released her second extended play (EP), Golden Age, in December 2019. She travelled to Florida to work on her next EP with her friend Alex, who appeared on Golden Age, but scrapped it after she went back to her home in Indiana. Cain wrote a new EP in about three weeks throughout the harsh Indiana winter. She used the feeling of being depressed and miserable to create songs for the new EP. In the midst of the COVID-19 pandemic, the American rapper Lil Aaron introduced Cain to people involved with Prescription Songs, a publishing company. She then signed with the company under her own imprint, Daughters of Cain.

On February 11, 2021, Cain announced her third EP, titled Inbred, alongside the release of its lead single, "Michelle Pfeiffer". It contains a guest feature from Lil Aaron, who produced the song with Kora Puckett, while Cain, Lil Aaron, and Puckett collaborated on its writing. It is the only song on the EP that Cain did not produce. The song was released alongside a visualizer that was filmed in an Indiana church. Cain described the song as "a breath of fresh air from a fresh start", as it was recorded in a studio during her first trip to Los Angeles. She further stated, "It felt like I was finally being seen for the artist I'd been trying to be for years." This sense of empowerment was inspired by the American actress Michelle Pfeiffer, the song's namesake, whom Cain has idolized for years. Inbred was released through Daughters of Cain on April 23, 2021; "Michelle Pfeiffer" appears as its opening track. Following its release, Cain's mother would show her clients the song at her nail salon.

== Composition ==
"Michelle Pfeiffer" is 4 minutes and 31 seconds long. It is an indie rock breakup song about ill-fated lovers consumed by their own desire. A power ballad, it also discusses the cinematic appeal of Los Angeles in its lyrics: "Everything's easier way out West, wholly mad and half undressed." On top of guitars and drums, Cain laments the line, "Wide awake all night thinking about you / Do you think of me too?" Lil Aaron's verse showcases him thinking about dying in a car accident. Pitchfork's Ryan Dombal likened Lil Aaron's appearance on the track as an impression of Lil Peep, but said Cain "more believably communicates [Lil Peep's] magnetic desperation".

Sandra Song from Paper called "Michelle Pfeiffer" a "haunting yet irresistibly moody track that elicits a sense of cinematic nostalgia", while Grant Rindner from Nylon said it "covers the pain of the kind of longing that makes you act truly recklessly". Billboard's Joe Lynch called the track "suitable-for-Twin Peaks", and said its guitar and steady rhythm anchor Cain's "restless creativity and cinematic scope". Arielle Gordon of Pitchfork described the song's lyricism focused on the Western United States "Thelma and Louise-esque".

== Critical reception ==
"Michelle Pfeiffer" garnered positive reception from music critics. In a review of the song for Pitchfork, Dombal said it "is stylish, toxic, and beyond high off its own feelings" and felt it should soundtrack a scene in the television series Euphoria. He also said the song "possesses a cresting emotionality grand enough to fill the tallest IMAX screen". For the same website, Eric Torres believed the song was able to bring the image of Cain's persona of "the unhappy wife of a corrupt preacher" to life, calling the track "sawtoothed". Song felt the track showcased Cain coming into her own and said its key aspect is "its sense of quiet power". The Line of Best Fit's Matthew Kent called the song a "gothic masterpiece" that "marks the start of a new chapter" for Cain.

Pitchfork considered "Michelle Pfeiffer" the 84th best song of 2021; Hannah Jocelyn jokingly called Cain "Florence + The Ketamine" and described the track as "blurry, bleary-eyed, but colossal". She also identified its differences from other tracks on Inbred; while other tracks deal with themes such as intergenerational trauma and abuse, she said "Michelle Pfeiffer" is "all release, pure unhinged gothic beauty". The Fader included the track in their weekly "10 songs you need in your life this week list"; Salvatore Maicki called it a "breathtaking lead single" for Inbred and "cinema that stares back".
