= Come un tuono =

Single by Rose Villain featuring Guè

from the album Radio Sakura
- Released: 29 March 2024
- Genre: Bachata
- Length: 2:55
- Label: Warner
- Songwriters: Rosa Luini; Cosimo Fini; Davide Petrella; Giorgio Pesenti; Andrea Ferrara
- Producers: Sixpm; okgiorgio

Rose Villain singles chronology
"Click Boom!" (2024)	"Come un tuono" (2024)	"Ho fatto un sogno" (2024)

Guè singles chronology
"Bull terrier" (2023)	"Come un tuono" (2024)	"Umorismo italiano" (2024)

Music video
- "Come un tuono" on YouTube

"Come un tuono" (transl. Like a thunder) is a song by Italian singer Rose Villain with featured vocals by Italian rapper Guè. It was released on 29 March 2024 by Warner Music Italy as the third single from her sophomore studio album Radio Sakura.

The song topped the Italian Singles Chart and was certified quadruple platinum in Italy.

A Spanish-language version of the song, "Como un trueno", featuring Colombian rapper Blessd was released on 30 August 2024.

== Music video ==
The music video for "Come un tuono", directed by Amedeo Zancanella, was released on the same day via Rose Villain's YouTube channel. Zancanella also directed the video for "Como un trueno", released on 30 August 2024.

== Charts ==
=== Weekly charts ===
Weekly chart performance for "Come un tuono"
Chart (2024)	Peak position
Italy (FIMI)	1
Italy Airplay (EarOne)	1

=== Year-end charts ===
2024 year-end chart performance for "Come un tuono"
Chart (2024)	Position
Italy (FIMI)	2

== Certifications ==
Region	Certification	Certified units/sales
Italy (FIMI)	4× Platinum	400,000^{‡}
^{‡} Sales+streaming figures based on certification alone.
