= Canzone d'amore (song) =

Single by Geolier

from the album Tutto è possibile
- Released: 16 January 2026
- Genre: Hip hop
- Length: 3:00
- Label: Atlantic Italy; Warner Music Italy
- Songwriters: Emanuele Palumbo; Gennaro Petito; Vincenzo Marino
- Producers: Poison Beatz; Sottomarino

Geolier singles chronology
"Phantom" (2025)	"Canzone d'amore" (2026)	"Amen" (2026)

Music video
- "Canzone d'amore" on YouTube

"Canzone d'amore" (transl. Love song) is a song by Italian rapper Geolier. It was released on 16 January 2026 by Atlantic Italy and Warner Music Italy as the fourth single from his fourth studio album, Tutto è possibile.

== Description ==
The song, written by the rapper himself, is produced by Gennaro Petito, aka Poison Beatz, and Vincenzo Marino, aka Sottomarino.

== Charts ==
Weekly chart performance for "Canzone d'amore"
Chart (2026)	Peak position
Italy (FIMI)	5

== Certifications ==
Certifications for "Canzone d'amore"
Region	Certification	Certified units/sales
Italy (FIMI)	Platinum	200,000^{‡}
^{‡} Sales+streaming figures based on certification alone.
