= Come vuoi =

2023 song by Geolier

Single by Geolier

from the album Il coraggio dei bambini
- Language: Neapolitan
- Released: 3 March 2023
- Genre: Hip hop; R&B
- Length: 2:52
- Label: Columbia
- Songwriters: Emanuele Palumbo; Davide Totaro
- Producer: Dat Boi Dee

Geolier singles chronology
"Money" (2022)	"Come vuoi" (2023)	"Me vogl bene" (2023)

Music video
- "Come vuoi" on YouTube

"Come vuoi" is a song by Italian rapper Geolier. It was released by Columbia on 3 March 2023 as the third single from his second studio album Il coraggio dei bambini.

The song peaked at number 9 on the Italian singles chart and was certified quintuple platinum in Italy.

== Music video ==
A music video of "Come vuoi", directed by Davide Vicari, was released on 1 March 2023 via Geolier's YouTube channel. It starred Italian television presenter Paola Di Benedetto and actor Giacomo Giorgio.

== Charts ==
=== Weekly charts ===
Weekly chart performance for "Come vuoi"
Chart (2023)	Peak position
Italy (FIMI)	9

=== Year-end charts ===
2023 year-end chart performance for "Come vuoi"
Chart (2023)	Position
Italy (FIMI)	10

2024 year-end chart performance for "Come vuoi"
Chart (2024)	Position
Italy (FIMI)	67

== Certifications ==
Region	Certification	Certified units/sales
Italy (FIMI)	5× Platinum	500,000^{‡}
^{‡} Sales+streaming figures based on certification alone.
