= Fragole (song) =

- Official cover

Single by Achille Lauro and Rose Villain
- Released: 12 May 2023
- Recorded: 2023
- Length: 3:29
- Label: Elektra; Warner
- Songwriters: Lauro De Marinis; Rosa Luini; Davide Petrella; Simon Pietro Manzari; Gregorio Calculli; Matteo Ciceroni; Mattia Cutolo
- Producers: Banf; Göw Trïbe; Gregorio Calculli

Achille Lauro singles chronology
"Che sarà" (2022)	"Fragole" (2023)	"Stupidi ragazzi" (2023)

Rose Villain singles chronology
"Cartoni animati" (2023)	"Fragole" (2023)	"Io, me ed altri guai" (2023)

"Fragole" (transl. "Strawberries") is a song co-written and recorded by Italian singers Achille Lauro and Rose Villain. It was released on 12 May 2023 by Elektra Records and Warner Music.

The song peaked at number 7 on the Italian Singles Chart and was certified triple platinum in Italy.

== Music video ==
The music video for "Fragole", directed by Leandro Manuel Emede, was released on 15 May 2023 via Lauro's YouTube channel.

== Charts ==
=== Weekly charts ===
Chart (2023)	Peak position
Italy (FIMI)	7
Italy Airplay (EarOne)	7

=== Year-end charts ===
Chart (2023)	Position
Italy (FIMI)	28

== Certifications ==
Region	Certification	Certified units/sales
Italy (FIMI)	3× Platinum	300,000^{‡}
^{‡} Sales+streaming figures based on certification alone.
