= Emanuele (album) =

Studio album by Geolier
- Released: 10 October 2019
- Label: BFM; Island; Universal
- Producer: Dat Boi Dee

Geolier chronology
Emanuele (2019)	Il coraggio dei bambini (2023)

Singles from Emanuele
- 1. "Como te" Released: 22 March 2019; 2. "Narcos" Released: 10 July 2019; 3. "Yacht" Released: 10 December 2019

Emanuele is the debut studio album by Italian recording artist Geolier, released by BFM Music, Island Records and Universal on 10 October 2019.

The album includes guest appearances of Luchè, Emis Killa, Lele Blade and Gué Pequeno. A re-issue of the album with six new tracks, entitled Emanuele: Marchio registrato, was released on 10 July 2020.

== Track listing ==
Emanuele track listing
No.	Title	Length
1.	"Intro"	2:02
2.	"Senz e me"	2:25
3.	"Chicano"	3:00
4.	"Na catena"	2:46
5.	"Provino"	3:15
6.	"Dreams"	3:15
7.	"Vogl sul a te"	3:06
8.	"Narcos"	3:16
9.	"Yacht" (featuring Luchè)	1:59
10.	"Mucho dinero"	3:22
11.	"Mala"	2:58
12.	"Como te" (featuring Emis Killa)	3:38
13.	"Mamacita" (featuring Lele Blade)	3:32
14.	"New York"	2:25
15.	"Amo ma chi t sap" (featuring MV Killa and Gué Pequeno)	3:30
16.	"Emanuele"	2:46
Total length:		47:15

Emanuele: Marchio registrato track listing
No.	Title	Length
1.	"Vittoria"	2:57
2.	"Capo"	2:32
3.	"Sorry"	2:46
4.	"Moncler"	3:40
5.	"Na catena RMX" (featuring Roshelle)	2:46
6.	"Narcos RMX" (featuring Lazza)	3:15
Total length:		65:11

== Charts ==
=== Weekly charts ===
Weekly chart performance for Emanuele
Chart (2020)	Peak position
Italian Albums (FIMI)	2

=== Year-end charts ===
2019 year-end chart performance for Emanuele
Chart (2019)	Position
Italian Albums (FIMI)	96

2020 year-end chart performance for Emanuele
Chart (2020)	Position
Italian Albums (FIMI)	14

2021 year-end chart performance for Emanuele
Chart (2021)	Position
Italian Albums (FIMI)	58

2022 year-end chart performance for Emanuele
Chart (2022)	Position
Italian Albums (FIMI)	98

2023 year-end chart performance for Emanuele
Chart (2023)	Position
Italian Albums (FIMI)	53

2024 year-end chart performance for Emanuele
Chart (2024)	Position
Italian Albums (FIMI)	56

== Certifications ==
Certifications for Emanuele
Region	Certification	Certified units/sales
Italy (FIMI)	4× Platinum	200,000^{‡}
^{‡} Sales+streaming figures based on certification alone.
