= Money (Geolier song) =

Single by Geolier

from the album Il coraggio dei bambini
- Released: 18 November 2022
- Genre: Hip hop
- Length: 2:45
- Label: Columbia
- Songwriters: Emanuele Palumbo; Davide Totaro
- Producers: Dat Boi Dee; Poison Beatz

Geolier singles chronology
"Chiagne" (2023)	"Money" (2022)	"Come vuoi" (2023)

Music video
- "Money" on YouTube

"Money" is a song by Italian rapper Geolier. It was released on 18 November 2022 by Columbia as the second single from the second studio album Il coraggio dei bambini.

== Description ==
The song talks about how the rapper's life changed after the success of his music career.

== Music video ==
The music video, directed by Davide Vicari, was released on the Geolier's YouTube channel to coincide with the song's release.

== Charts ==
Weekly chart performance for "Money"
Chart (2022)	Peak position
Italy (FIMI)	8

== Certifications ==
Certifications for "Money"
Region	Certification	Certified units/sales
Italy (FIMI)	Platinum	100,000^{‡}
^{‡} Sales+streaming figures based on certification alone.
