= Dio lo sa =

Studio album by Geolier
- Released: 7 June 2024
- Genres: Hip hop; pop rap
- Length: 63:18
- Label: Warner Music Italy
- Producers: Ceru167; Dardust; Dat Boi Dee; Finesse; geenaro; Ghana Beats; Juli; Kekko D'Alessio; MACE; Michelangelo; Natt; Poison Beatz; ROOM9; Seventeens; Sixpm; Shune; Starchild; Takagi & Ketra; Voga; Yung Snapp

Geolier chronology
| Il coraggio dei bambini (2023) | Dio lo sa (2024) | Tutto è possibile (2026) |

Singles from Dio lo sa
- 1. "I p' me, tu p' te" Released: 7 February 2024; 2. "L'ultima poesia" Released: 22 March 2024; 3. "El Pibe de Oro" Released: 10 May 2024; 4. "Una vita fa" Released: 7 June 2024; 5. "Episodio d'amore" Released: 16 August 2024

Singles from Dio lo sa: Atto II
- 1. "Mai per sempre" Released: 20 November 2024

Dio lo sa (transl. God knows it) is the third studio album by Italian rapper Geolier, released by Warner Music Italy on 7 June 2024.

The album includes guest features by Italian rappers Lazza, Sfera Ebbasta, Shiva, Luchè and Guè, Italian singer Ultimo and Argentine singer María Becerra as well as rap duo Co'Sang and singer Rose Villain in its deluxe version. It topped the Italian albums chart.

== Track listing ==
Dio lo sa track listing
| No. | Title | Lyrics | Music | Producer(s) | Length |
|---|---|---|---|---|---|
| 1. | "Per sempre" | Emanuele Palumbo | Michele Zocca | Michelangelo | 2:59 |
| 2. | "Idee chiare" (featuring Lazza) | Palumbo; Jacopo Lazzarini | Davide Totaro; Amritvir Singh | Seventeens; Finesse; Dat Boi Dee | 2:39 |
| 3. | "El Pibe de Oro" | Palumbo | Gennaro Petito | Poison Beatz | 2:35 |
| 4. | "Si stat' tu" | Palumbo | Totaro; Dennis Opoku; Gennaro Frenken; Petito; Giuseppe Alfano | Dat Boi Dee; Poison Beatz | 3:25 |
| 5. | "Io t'o giur'" (featuring Sfera Ebbasta) | Palumbo; Davide Petrella; Gionata Boschetti | Dario Faini; Petrella | Dardust | 3:20 |
| 6. | "Presidente" | Palumbo; Billie Rae Calvin; Martina Pranzii | Totaro; Vincenzo Marino; Francesco D'Alessio; Francesco Silotto | Dat Boi Dee; Kekko D'Alessio | 3:14 |
| 7. | "Una come te" | Palumbo | Totaro; Marino | Dat Boi Dee | 2:24 |
| 8. | "Emirates" | Palumbo; Mavi Gagliardi; D'Alessio; Giuseppe Seno | Petito; Opoku; Frenken; Alfano | Poison Beatz | 2:41 |
| 9. | "Una vita fa" (featuring Shiva) | Palumbo; Andrea Arrigoni; Domenico di Nardo | Simone Benussi; Andrea Ghiazzi | MACE; Shune | 2:51 |
| 10. | "Episodio d'amore" | Palumbo; Federica Abbate | Fabio Clemente; Alessandro Merli; Totaro; Luca Faraone | Takagi & Ketra; Dat Boi Dee | 3:16 |
| 11. | "6 milioni di euro fa (skit)" | Palumbo | Totaro | Dat Boi Dee | 1:27 |
| 12. | "357" (featuring Guè) | Palumbo; Cosimo Fini | Totaro; Alessandro Cerullo | Dat Boi Dee; Ceru167 | 2:20 |
| 13. | "Dio lo sa" | Palumbo; Sara Di Carlo | Totaro; Marino | Dat Boi Dee | 3:19 |
| 14. | "Bella e brutta notizia" (featuring María Becerra) | Palumbo; María de los Ángeles Becerra; Xavier Rosero | Frenken; Opoku; Petito; Alfano; Maximilian Zajer | Poison Beatz; geenaro; Ghana Beats | 3:48 |
| 15. | "Già lo sai" (featuring Luchè) | Palumbo; Luca Imprudente | Totaro | Dat Boi Dee | 3:09 |
| 16. | "Scumpar" | Palumbo | Petito; Antonio Lago; Salvatore Mollica; Alessandro Silvestro | Yung Snapp; Dat Boi Dee | 3:02 |
| 17. | "I p' me, tu p' te" | Palumbo; Paolo Antonacci; Davide Simonetta | Simonetta; Totaro; D'Alessio; Petito; Zocca | Michelangelo | 3:08 |
| 18. | "Nu parl, nu sent, nu vec" | Palumbo | Totaro; Petito | Poison Beatz | 2:14 |
| 19. | "CLS" (featuring Yung Snapp, MV Killa, Lele Blade) | Palumbo; Lago; Alessandro Arena; Marcello Valerio | Totaro | Dat Boi Dee | 4:07 |
| 20. | "L'ultima poesia" (featuring Ultimo) | Palumbo; Niccolò Moriconi; Petrella | Palumbo; Petrella; Merli; Clemente; Petito; Julien Boverod | Juli | 3:48 |
| 21. | "Finché non si muore" | Palumbo; Leo Chiosso | Petito; Ferdinando Buscaglione | Poison Beatz | 3:32 |
| Total length: | | | | | 63:18 |

Dio lo sa: Atto II bonus tracks
| No. | Title | Lyrics | Music | Producer(s) | Length |
|---|---|---|---|---|---|
| 1. | "Reale" | Palumbo | Totaro; Marino | Dat Boi Dee | 2:59 |
| 2. | "Smith 'n' Wesson" | Palumbo | Totaro | Dat Boi Dee | 2:20 |
| 3. | "500K" | Palumbo | Lago; Murad Nuri | Yung Snapp | 2:36 |
| 4. | "Tu ed io" (featuring Rose Villain) | Palumbo; Rosa Luini | Andrea Ferrara; Petito; Giovanni Amati; Vincenzo Raccuglia | Sixpm | 3:03 |
| 5. | "Che sole oggi" | Palumbo | Totaro; Marino | Dat Boi Dee | 3:10 |
| 6. | "Cchiu' fort" (featuring Co'Sang) | Palumbo; Imprudente; Antonio Ricciardi | Niccolò De Simone; Riccardo Strona; Tommaso Masiello | Natt | 3:15 |
| 7. | "Mai per sempre" | Palumbo; Petrella | Faini | Dardust | 3:40 |
| 8. | "Nun sacc' perdere" | Palumbo | Enrico Esposito; Lorenzo Biscione | Voga | 3:23 |

Digital re-issue bonus tracks
| No. | Title | Lyrics | Music | Producer(s) | Length |
|---|---|---|---|---|---|
| 30. | "Ferrari" | Palumbo | Totaro; Gabriel Rossi; Lorenzo Santarelli; Marco Salvaderi | ROOM9 | 2:43 |
| 31. | "Parl' cu mme" | Palumbo | Totaro | Dat Boi Dee; Starchild | 2:13 |

== Charts ==
=== Weekly charts ===
Weekly chart performance for Dio lo sa
| Chart (2024) | Peak position |
|---|---|
| Italian Albums (FIMI) | 1 |
| Swiss Albums (Schweizer Hitparade) | 9 |

=== Year-end charts ===
Year-end chart performance for Dio lo sa – Atto II
| Chart (2024) | Position |
|---|---|
| Italian Albums (FIMI) | 2 |

== Certifications ==
Certifications for Dio lo sa
| Region | Certification | Certified units/sales |
|---|---|---|
| Italy (FIMI) | 8× Platinum | 400,000^{‡} |
^{‡} Sales+streaming figures based on certification alone.
