= Io, me ed altri guai =

- Official cover

Single by Rose Villain

from the album Radio Sakura
- Released: 6 October 2023
- Genre: Punk rock
- Length: 2:57
- Label: Warner
- Songwriters: Rosa Luini; Paolo Antonacci; Edward Cobb; Andrea Ferrara
- Producer: Sixpm

Rose Villain singles chronology
"Fragole" (2023)	"Io, me ed altri guai" (2023)	"Blu" (2023)

Music video
- "Io, me ed altri guai" on YouTube

"Io, me ed altri guai" (transl. Me, myself and other troubles) is a song co-written and recorded by Italian singer Rose Villain. It was released on 6 October 2023 by Warner Music Italy as the lead single from her sophomore studio album Radio Sakura.

The song includes a sample of Ed Cobb's song "Tainted Love".

== Charts ==
Chart performance for "Io, me ed altri guai"
Chart (2023)	Peak position
Italy (FIMI)	37
Italy Airplay (EarOne)	14

== Certifications ==
Region	Certification	Certified units/sales
Italy (FIMI)	Platinum	100,000^{‡}
^{‡} Sales+streaming figures based on certification alone.
