= Radio Vega =

Studio album by Rose Villain
- Released: 14 March 2025
- Recorded: 2024–2025
- Genre: Pop; pop rap; alternative pop; electropop
- Length: 37:07
- Language: Italian; English
- Label: Warner Music Italy
- Producer: Sixpm; Rose Villain; Chef P; Cripo; Daykoda; Dbackinyahead; Loudly; Mr. Monkey; okgiorgio; Tyrak

Rose Villain chronology
Radio Sakura (2024)	Radio Vega (2025)

Singles from Radio Vega
- 1. "Fuorilegge" Released: 12 February 2025; 2. "Victoria's Secret" Released: 30 May 2025; 3. "Bollicine" Released: 24 September 2025

Radio Vega is the third studio album by Italian singer-songwriter Rose Villain, released on 14 March 2025. In November 2025, Villain released an extended deluxe edition of the album, titled Radio Vega: After Dark.

== Track listing ==
Radio Vega – Standard track listing
No.	Title	Lyrics	Music	Producer(s)	Length
1.	"Il bacio del serpente" (featuring Guè)	Rosa Luini; Cosimo Fini	Andrea Ferrara; Luis Guillermo Marval Camero; Rene Cano	Sixpm	2:12
2.	"Millionaire"	Luini	Luini; Ferrara; Vincenzo Liguori	Rose Villain; Sixpm; Loudly	2:29
3.	"No vabbè!" (featuring Lazza)	Luini; Jacopo Lazzarini	Ferrara; Pietro Miano; Tarik Belhajjam; Vincenzo Di Bacco	Sixpm; Chef P; Dbackinyahead; Tyrak	2:40
4.	"Ancora" (featuring Geolier)	Luini; Emanuele Palumbo	Ferrara; Vincenzo Liguori	Sixpm	3:08
5.	"Musica per dimenticare"	Luini	Ferrara	Sixpm	2:46
6.	"Patrick Bateman"	Luini	Luini; Ferrara; Andrea Gamba	Rose Villain; Sixpm; Daykoda	2:22
7.	"Lacrimogeni" (featuring Chiello)	Luini; Rocco Modello	Ferrara; Matteo Novi	Sixpm; Mr. Monkey	3:30
8.	"Fuorilegge"	Luini	Federica Abbate; Ferrara; Nicola Lazzarin	Sixpm; Cripo; okgiorgio	3:41
9.	"Bop!" (featuring Fabri Fibra)	Luini; Fabrizio Tarducci; Federico Palana	Ferrara	Sipxm	2:33
10.	"Smith & Wesson"	Luini	Ferrara; Fausto Cigarini	Sixpm	3:16
11.	"Tu sai"	Luini	Ferrara	Sixpm	3:02
12.	"WTF"	Luini	Ferrara	Sixpm	2:58
13.	"L'amore è un serial killer"	Luini	Ferrara	Sixpm	2:30
Total length:					37:07

Radio Vega: After Dark – Deluxe bonus tracks
No.	Title	Lyrics	Music	Producer(s)	Length
2.	"Bollicine"	Luini	Luini; Ferrara; Ludovico Marino; Liguori	Sixpm; Ludovivo Mar	2:40
3.	"Sbalzi d'umore" (featuring Annalisa)	Luini; Annalisa Scarrone	Ferrara; Marino; Liguori	Sixpm; okgiorgio; Ludovico Mar	2:58
12.	"Victoria's Secret" (featuring Tony Effe)	Luini; Nicolò Rapisarda; Liguori	Ferrara; Giorgio Pesenti; Marino; Liguori	Sixpm; okgiorgio; Ludovico Mar	3:14
15.	"Paralisi del sonno" (featuring Salmo)	Luini; Maurizio Pisciottu	Ferrara	Sixpm	2:55
18.	"Il tuo male è il mio male" (featuring Gaia)	Luini; Gaia Gozzi; Liguori	Ferrara; Marino; Liguori	Sixpm; Ludovico Mar	4:07

== Charts ==
Weekly chart performance for Radio Vega
Chart (2025)	Peak position
Italian Albums (FIMI)	1
Swiss Albums (Schweizer Hitparade)	91

== Certifications ==
Certifications for Radio Vega
Region	Certification	Certified units/sales
Italy (FIMI)	Platinum	50,000^{‡}
^{‡} Sales+streaming figures based on certification alone.
