= Il coraggio dei bambini =

Studio album by Geolier
- Released: 6 January 2023
- Genre: Hip hop
- Length: 50:25
- Label: Columbia; Sony
- Producer: Geolier; Dat Boi Dee; Daves; Michelangelo; Poison Beatz; Takagi & Ketra

Geolier chronology
Emanuele (2019)	Il coraggio dei bambini (2023)	Dio lo sa (2024)

Singles from Il coraggio dei bambini
- 1. "Chiagne" Released: 28 October 2022; 2. "Money" Released: 18 November 2022; 3. "Come vuoi" Released: 3 March 2023

Il coraggio dei bambini is the second studio album by Italian rapper Geolier, released by Columbia Records and Sony Music on 6 January 2023.

The album includes guest appearances by Italian rappers Sfera Ebbasta, Guè, Shiva, Lele Blade, Lazza and Paky as well as singer Giorgia and rapper Marracash in its deluxe edition. A re-issue of the album with six new tracks, entitled Il coraggio dei bambini: Atto II, was released on 7 April 2023.

It peaked at number 1 on the Italian Album Chart, becoming the best-selling album of 2023 in Italy. Despite not being released as singles, the track "X caso" featuring Sfera Ebbasta and the digital reissue's track "Il male che mi fai" featuring Marracash, peaked at number 1 of the FIMI's single chart.

== Track listing ==
Il coraggio dei bambini track listing
No.	Title	Lyrics	Music	Producer(s)	Length
1.	"Ricchezza"	Emanuele Palumbo	Davide Totaro	Dat Boi Dee	3:04
2.	"Poco/Troppo"	Palumbo	Totaro	Dat Boi Dee	3:15
3.	"X caso" (featuring Sfera Ebbasta)	Palumbo; Gionata Boschetti	Totaro; Davide Covino; Carlo Pizzocaro; Francesco Ravesi	Dat Boi Dee; Daves	3:35
4.	"Me vulev fa ruoss"	Palumbo	Palumbo	Geolier	2:53
5.	"Lonely"	Palumbo	Gennaro Petito	Poison Beatz	3:28
6.	"Nun se ver" (featuring Guè)	Palumbo; Cosimo Fini	Totaro	Dat Boi Dee	2:38
7.	"Monday" (featuring Shiva and Michelangelo)	Palumbo; Andrea Arrigoni	Michele Zocca	Michelangelo	2:45
8.	"Money"	Palumbo	Totaro; Petito	Dat Boi Dee; Poison Beatz	2:45
9.	"Maradona"	Palumbo	Totaro	Dat Boi Dee	2:42
10.	"I Am"	Palumbo	Totaro	Dat Boi Dee	2:13
11.	"Napo****no"	Palumbo	Totaro	Dat Boi Dee	2:48
12.	"Niente di speciale"	Palumbo	Totaro	Dat Boi Dee	2:30
13.	"Come vuoi"	Palumbo	Totaro	Dat Boi Dee	2:50
14.	"In trappola" (featuring Lele Blade)	Palumbo; Alessandro Arena	Totaro; Petito	Dat Boi Dee; Poison Beatz	2:17
15.	"Here I Come"	Palumbo; Barrington Levy; Paul Donald Love	Petito; Levy; Love	Poison Beatz	2:22
16.	"Chiagne" (featuring Lazza and Takagi & Ketra)	Palumbo; Jacopo Lazzarini; Davide Petrella	Alessandro Merli; Fabio Clemente	Takagi & Ketra	2:59
17.	"Non ci torni più" (featuring Paky)	Palumbo; Vincenzo Mattera	Totaro	Dat Boi Dee	2:39
18.	"Give You My Love"	Palumbo	Totaro	Dat Boi Dee	2:40
Total length:					50:25

Il coraggio dei bambini: Atto II bonus tracks
No.	Title	Lyrics	Music	Producer(s)	Length
1.	"2 secondi"	Palumbo	Totaro; Petito; Giovanni Amati; Vincenzo Raccuglia	Dat Boi Dee; Poison Beatz	2:29
2.	"Il male che mi fai" (featuring Marracash)	Palumbo; Fabio Rizzo; Petito	Totaro	Dat Boi Dee	2:47
3.	"Soldati"	Palumbo	Petito	Poison Beatz	2:25
4.	"Ultima canzone" (featuring Giorgia)	Palumbo; Giorgia Todrani	Totaro	Dat Boi Dee	3:22
5.	"So Fly"	Palumbo	Totaro	Dat Boi Dee	2:18
6.	"Hermes"	Palumbo	Petito; Amati; Raccuglia	Poison Beatz	2:56
Total length:					66:40

== Charts ==
=== Weekly charts ===
Weekly chart performance for Il coraggio dei bambini
Chart (2023)	Peak position
Italian Albums (FIMI)	1
Swiss Albums (Schweizer Hitparade)	8

=== Year-end charts ===
Year-end chart performance for Il coraggio dei bambini
Chart (2023)	Position
Italian Albums (FIMI)	1

Year-end chart performance for Il coraggio dei bambini – Atto II
Chart (2024)	Position
Italian Albums (FIMI)	14

== Certifications ==
Certifications for Il coraggio dei bambini
Region	Certification	Certified units/sales
Italy (FIMI)	8× Platinum	400,000^{‡}
^{‡} Sales+streaming figures based on certification alone.

== Year-end lists ==
Selected year-end rankings of Il coraggio dei bambini
Publication	List	Rank	Ref.
Rolling Stone	The 30 Best Italian Albums of 2023	3	
