= Michelle Pfeiffer (Rose Villain song) =

- Official cover

Single by Rose Villain featuring Tony Effe

from the album Radio Gotham
- Released: 13 May 2022
- Genre: Pop rap
- Length: 3:00
- Label: Columbia; Arista; Sony
- Songwriters: Rosa Luini; Nicolò Rapisarda; Andrea Ferrara
- Producer: Sixpm

Rose Villain singles chronology
"Piango sulla Lambo" (2022)	"Michelle Pfeiffer" (2022)	"Rari" (2022)

Tony Effe singles chronology
"Si" (2022)	"Michelle Pfeiffer" (2022)	"Il doc 3" (2023)

Music video
- "Michelle Pfeiffer" on YouTube

"Michelle Pfeiffer" is a song by Italian singer Rose Villain with featured vocals by Italian rapper Tony Effe. It is named after the American actress and was released on 13 May 2022 as the second single from Rose Villain's debut album studio Radio Gotham.

The song peaked at number 32 the Italian Singles Chart and was certified platinum in Italy.

== Music video ==
The music video for "Michelle Pfeiffer", directed by Gianluca Dell'Argine, was released on the same day via Rose Villain's YouTube channel.

== Charts ==
Chart performance for "Michelle Pfeiffer"
Chart (2022)	Peak position
Italy (FIMI)	32

== Certifications ==
Region	Certification	Certified units/sales
Italy (FIMI)	Platinum	100,000^{‡}
^{‡} Sales+streaming figures based on certification alone.
