= Fotografia (Geolier song) =

Single by Geolier

from the album Tutto è possibile
- Released: 7 November 2025
- Genre: Pop rap
- Length: 3:44
- Label: Atlantic Italy; Warner Music Italy
- Songwriters: Emanuele Palumbo; Davide Petrella; Gennaro Petito; Vincenzo Marino
- Producers: Poison Beatz; Sottomarino

Geolier singles chronology
"Mai per sempre" (2024)	"Fotografia" (2025)	"081" (2025)

Music video
- "Fotografia" on YouTube

"Fotografia" (transl. Photograph) is a song by Italian rapper Geolier. It was released on 7 November 2025 by Atlantic Italy and Warner Music Italy as the lead single from his upcoming fourth studio album, Tutto è possibile.

== Description ==
The song, a pop rap ballad written by the rapper himself with Davide Petrella, aka Tropico, is produced by Gennaro Petito, aka Poison Beatz, and Vincenzo Marino, aka Sottomarino, and speaks of a love story that combines intensity and truth with an increasingly mature writing style.

== Promotion ==
The song was previewed by the rapper himself with a studio video published on 3 November 2025 through his social media profiles.

== Charts ==
Weekly chart performance for "Fotografia"
Chart (2025)	Peak position
Italy (FIMI)	1
Italy Airplay (EarOne)	28

== Certifications ==
Certifications for "Mai per sempre"
Region	Certification	Certified units/sales
Italy (FIMI)	Platinum	200,000^{‡}
^{‡} Sales+streaming figures based on certification alone.
