= Rose Villain =

Italian singer-songwriter and rapper (born 1989)

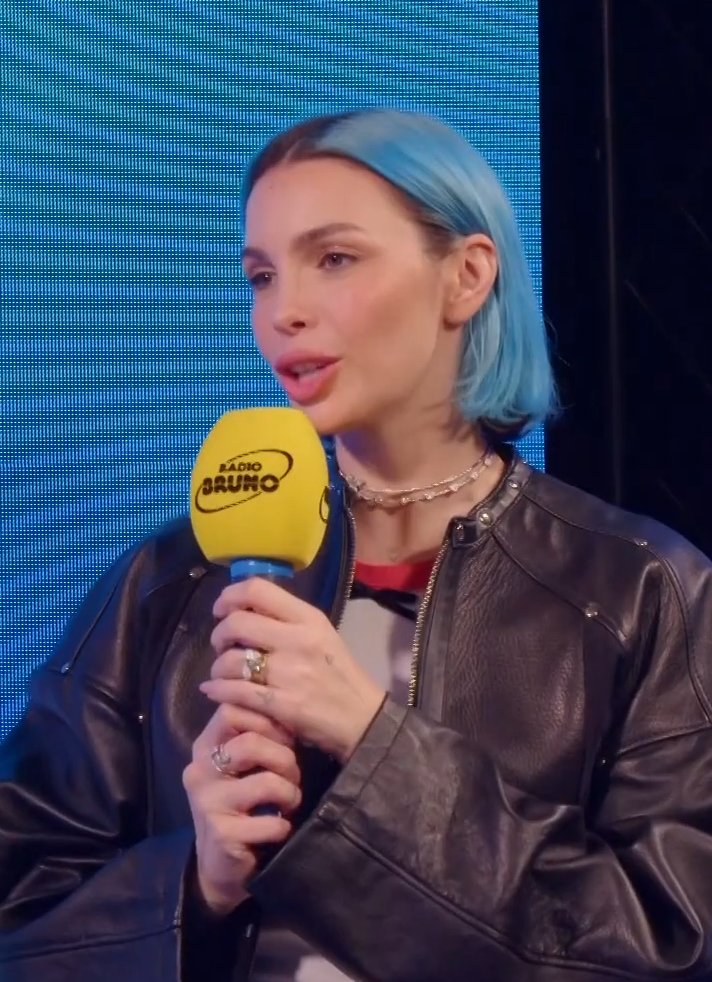
- Rose Villain in February 2025

Background information
- Born: Rosa Luini; 20 July 1989 (age 37); Milan, Italy
- Genres: Pop; hip hop; rock
- Occupations: Singer; songwriter; rapper
- Instruments: Vocals; guitar
- Works: Discography
- Years active: 2010–present
- Labels: Machete Empire (2016–2017); Republic (2018–2019); Arista; Columbia; Sony Music Italy (2020–2023); Warner Music Italy (2023–present)
- Spouse: Sixpm (m. 2022)
- Website: rosevillainmusic.com

Rosa Luini (born 20 July 1989), known professionally as Rose Villain, is an Italian singer-songwriter and rapper.

Villain first achieved popularity in 2016, thanks to the platinum certified single "Don Medellín" together with Italian rapper Salmo and then, in 2020, with the quadruple platinum certified single "Chico", together with Italian rapper Guè Pequeno. In 2021, she collaborated once again with Guè Pequeno on the songs "Elvis" and "Piango sulla Lambo". In 2022, her single "Michelle Pfeiffer" with Tony Effe was certified platinum. Furthermore, Villain signed a deal with the Italian hip hop label Machete Empire Records and also signed a record deal with Republic Records.

On 20 January 2023, Villain released her first studio album, Radio Gotham which was certified platinum by FIMI. The album contains the singles "Michelle Pfeiffer" and "Lamette", as well as the double platinum song "Fantasmi". In 2023, she also collaborated with Achille Lauro on the triple platinum certified single "Fragole". In 2024, she competed for the first time at the Sanremo Music Festival with the track "Click Boom!", ahead of the release of her second studio album Radio Sakura on 8 March 2024. She competed again the following year with the song "Fuorilegge".

== Early life ==
Rosa Luini is the daughter of Milanese entrepreneur Franco Luini, founder of the fashion brand Tucano, and Fernanda Melloni. Born and raised in Milan, she discovered her predisposition for singing in elementary schools. She spent her life in Milan together with her family and her younger brother Alessandro; at age 18, she moved to Los Angeles, where she studied contemporary music at the Musicians Institute of Hollywood, majoring in rock music.

Luini studied musical instruments and was encouraged by her teachers to write lyrics. While living in Los Angeles, she sang for a punk rock cover band called The Villains, from which her stage name, Rose Villain, was inspired. She later moved to New York City, where she completed her studies in Broadway. After completing her studies, she met her first managers: Mark Gartenberg, a former A&R for Sony Music Entertainment, and Eric Beall, ex-vice president creative of Sony ATV. She then signed with their company named Adesso, but reportedly decided to leave it in 2020.

As she met her executive producer, the Italian multiplatinum producer Sixpm, the two became engaged. The two married on 28 May 2022, in New York.

== Career ==
=== 2016–2017: Debut singles ===
In 2016, Villain signed with the famous Italian hip hop independent label Machete Empire Records, becoming the first female artist of the roster. On 19 July 2016, she released her debut single, "Get the Fuck Out of My Pool", which mixed electronic music and hip hop; the music video of the song was shot between Brooklyn and Manhattan. A couple of months later, she released her second single, "Geisha", which earned her the title "Artist of the Month" on the Italian MTV New Generation. On 11 November 2016, the Italian rapper Salmo released the single "Don Medellín", featuring Villain, for the re-release of his album Hellvisback; it peaked at number 13 on FIMI's singles chart and was certified platinum, in addition to being viewed over 16 million views on YouTube.

In 2017, Villain signed a distribution deal with Universal Music Germany; through the label, she released the a remix of "Geisha", who was remixed by Swanky Tunes. In the same year, which was a difficult year due to the untimely death of her mother, Villain released the singles "Kitty Kitty" and "Don't Call The Po-Po", shooting and directing the latter's music video in New York. In 2020, "Don't Call The Po-Po" was included in the soundtrack of the second season of L.A.'s Finest. The first singles immediately caught the attention of Eddie O'Loughlin of Republic Records, who decided to meet Villain and offer her a record deal.

=== 2018–2019: Signing with Republic Records ===
In early 2018, Villain announced the signing with Republic Records, becoming the first Italian artist to sign a record deal with the label. The first single with Republic Records, "Funeral Party", was released on 20 July 2018 and was a mix between pop and dancehall, the music video of the song was directed by the same Villain and was shot in Kingston, Jamaica. Later that same year, she signed with Next Model Management. On 26 July 2019, she released her second single with Republic Records called "Swoop!", produced by Sidney Swift and Sixpm; it contained a sample of Whoomp! (There It Is) by Tag Team. She also released "Kanye Loves Kanye" via Island Records UK, with MDNT and SIXPM.

At the end of 2019, due to different artistic visions with her A&R, Villain ended her contract with Republic Records, refusing even to renew the deal, she decided to be an independent artist for a while; in fall 2019, she released two singles, "Sneakers" and "It's Snowing Motherfucker", releasing a music video for the former in December 2018.

=== 2020–2022: Italian projects ===
In 2020, Villain joined MeNext Agency, signed a new record deal with Arista, Sony Music Italy, and she released her first single in Italian, named "Bundy". A couple months later, she released the official single in Italian titled "Il Diavolo Piange"; its music video was shot in New York and was directed by Joe Mischo, also known as Brume. In the summer of 2020, she was featured on "Chico" by the Italian rapper Guè Pequeno; the single was part of his studio album Mr. Fini and also featured Luchè. "Chico" became a success in Italy; it peaked at number 5 on FIMI's singles charts, was certified 4× platinum, and was named as one of the ten top-selling songs in 2020 in Italy.

After the success of "Chico", Villain released her third single in Italian, titled "Goodbye". She appeared on "Stone Cold Digital", part of A Pale Blue Dot by Dreamshade, a Swiss melodic death metal band; the album was released in March 2021. She also appeared on Corona Love Story by Mondo Marcio, released in February 2021. On 13 April 2021, she announced her collaboration with Paco Rabanne, having been chosen as testimonial for the launch of the fragrance Lady Million Fabolous.

On 4 May 2021, Villain released "Soli" with Giaime. On 2 July 2021, she released via Coulumbia Records Italy and Arista Records Italy the single "Elvis" featuring Guè Pequeno and SIXPM who produced also the record, she recorded the record few months back in Santo Domingo, the single contains a sample of Heartbreak Hotel of Elvis Presley. The video of the single directed by The Astronauts was released on 6 August 2021. The single to date has surpassed over 3 million plays on Spotify. On 9 July 2021, Italian DJ and producer Don Joe released his album entitled Milano Soprano, the album contains the single "Kandinsky", which saw Villain and Italian rapper Ernia as featured artists. On 23 July 2021, Italian rapper Emis Killa released the mixtape Keta Music Vol 3; the mixtape includes the song "Psycho", which saw Villain as featured artist. On 1 September 2021, Villain was chosen by Apple Music as the Up Next Italia artist, the Apple Music initiative aimed at identifying and promoting emerging talents.

On 15 September 2021, on the occasion of 100 Years of Fashion of L'Officiel Italia, Villain has been selected by Italian singer Elisa as one of the most relevant female presences in Italian music. On 8 October 2021, the single "Eva+Eva" by Italian singer Annalisa was released, the song is contained in the album Nuda, for the occasion, the singer decided to revisit the song and launch it as a single in collaboration with another female artist of the Italian scene, so she chooses Villain. The music video of Eva + Eva was released on 12 October 2021, on the YouTube channel of Warner Music Italy. On 12 November 2021, Villain released the single "Gangsta Love" featuring the Italian rapper Rosa Chemical via Columbia and Arista records Italy.

On 10 December 2021, Billain's third collaboration with Guè Pequeno was released for the song "Piango sulla Lambo" included in the seventh album of the rapper titled Guesus. In the summer 2022, "Piango sulla Lambo" is certified platinum . On the same day, Orietta Berti's single "Luna piena", of which Villain was the songwriter, was released. On 18 March 2022, Italian rapper Fabri Fibra released his tenth studio album titled Caos. Villain is featured on the song "GoodFellas". On 22 April 2022, Italian rapper Fred De Palma released the EP PLC Tape 1. Villain is featured on the song "Au revoir" together Guè. On 13 May 2022, Villain released her single "Michelle Pfeifer" featuring Italian rapper Tony Effe. "Michelle Pfeifer" is certified gold by FIMI in October 2022, while is official platinum in February 2023.

On 20 May 2022, the official soundtrack for the Italian TV series Blocco 181 created and produced by Italian rapper Salmo was released. Villain is one of the artists chosen by the rapper for the soundtrack; she is featured alongside Italian rapper Jake La Furia on the song "M.S.O.M.". On 28 June 2022, Villain was chosen by the Italian rapper Fedez as one of the performing artists for the benefit concert Love Mi. On 22 July 2022, the collective Italian rap group SLF released the mixtape We The Squad Vol. 1 (Summer Edition); Villain is featured on the remix single "Travesuras" together MV Killa, Yung Snapp, Vale Lambo, and Fred De Palma. On 7 October 2022, Villain released her single "Rari". The official music video of "Rari", directed by Amedeo Zancanella, set in New York, and inspired by the movie Kill Bill was released on VEVO on 13 October 2022. On 4 November 2022, Italian rapper Rondodasosa released his debut album titled Trenches Baby; Villain is featured together Italian rapper Ghali on the song "Cell". On 18 November 2022, Italian rapper Ernia released his fourth studio album Io non ho paura; Villain is one of the writers of the single "Bella fregatura". On 25 November 2022, Irama released the deluxe edition of his album Il giorno in cui ho smesso di pensare with three new songs; one of them is "Canzoni tristi", where Villain is the featured artist.

=== 2023: Radio Gotham ===
On 19 December 2022, Villain announced the release of her debut album titled Radio Gotham, released on 20 January 2023. The album was anticipated by the singles "Elvis", "Michelle Pfeiffer", and "Rari" released between 2021 and 2022. On 10 January 2023, she released the single "Lamette" featuring Italian rapper Salmo. The video of "Lamette" was directed by Amedeo Zancanella, produced by Maestro & Think Cattleya, and was released on 18 January 2023. The following day, Villain appeared on the cover of Rolling Stone Italia. On 13 January 2023, Italian rapper Guè released his eighth studio album Madreperla. Villain again worked with Guè, this time as a songwriter on the song "Chiudi gli occhi". Radio Gotham was released officially on 20 January 2023. The album includes 14 songs featuring Salmo, Tedua, Geolier, Carl Brave, Elisa, Tony Effe, and Guè. The album is fully produced by her husband, Italian producer Sixpm, with Zef, Young Miles, Stevie Aiello, and HNDRC as co-producers. Radio Gotham is an ode to New York; the lyrics were written by Villain, who was inspired by personal experiences. The album peaked at number 5 on the Italian albums chart, while two songs from the album, "Due facce" and "Fantasmi", debuted at 47 and 56 on the Italian singles chart respectively.

On 10 February 2023, Villain joined Rosa Chemical for the duets evening of the Sanremo Music Festival 2023 to cover "America" by Gianna Nannini, ranking eighth in the contest. On 14 April 2023, the song "Cartoni animati" was released as the next single from Radio Gotham. On 1 May 2023, Villain was one of the performers of the annual concert of Primo Maggio in Rome organized by CGIL, CISL and UIL for Labour Day. On May 12, 2013, she was featured on the single "Fragole" by Achille Lauro. Radio Gotham was certified platinum by FIMI for sales exceeding 50,000 copies in Italy. In June 2023, in conjunction with the announcement of her participation as a judge for the Netflix show Nuova Scena - Rhythm + Flow Italia together Fabri Fibra and Geolier, her single Lamette with Salmo was certified gold by FIMI. On 9 June 2023, Carl Brave released his new album Migrazioni, for the project the artist chose to work with Rose for the track "Rimpianti". On 27 June 2023, she announced her moving and signing to Warner Music Italy, and she announced the two date shows: A Villain Story: The Beginning in Rome and Milan. In July 2023, "Fragole" with Lauro reached the Top 10 of the FIMI official singles chart and was later certified double platinum. In July 2023, the song "Fantasmi" from her album Radio Gotham was certified double platinum by FIMI. On 17 September 2023, she received the TIM Music Awards for the certified gold album for Radio Gotham.

=== 2023–2024: Sanremo Music Festival and Radio Sakura ===
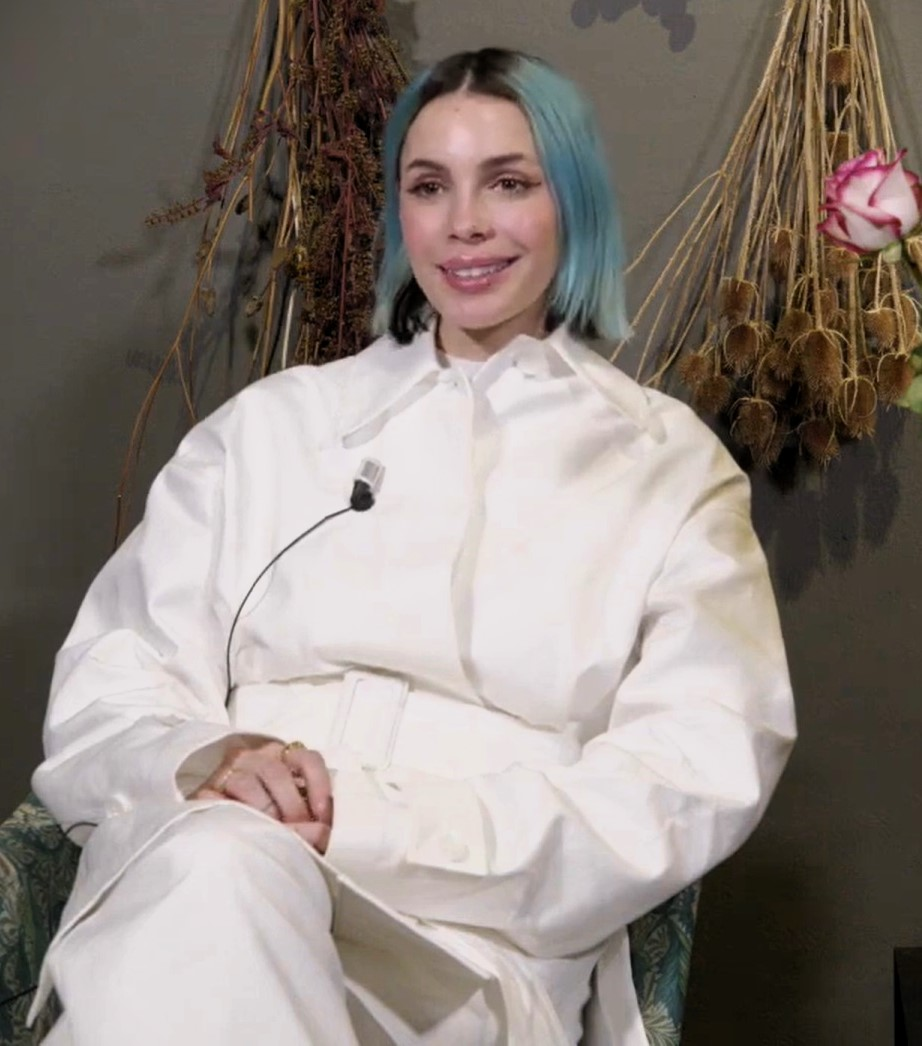
Villain in January 2024

On 7 October 2023, Villain released her first single through Warner Music Italy, titled "Io, me ed altri guai", which contains a sample of "Tainted Love" by Soft Cell; the single was certified gold by FIMI, her first single as a solo artist to do so, on 23 January 2024 . On 1 December 2023, she collaborated with the Italian band Yosh Whale for the single "Blu". On 9 December 2023, she was featured on the song "Hall of Fame" included in the joint album of Artie 5ive e Rondodasosa titled Motivation 4 The Streetz.

Villain competed in the Sanremo Music Festival 2024 with the song "Click Boom!". The song placed 23rd in the competition and peaked at number 8 on the Italian singles chart, becoming her first solo song to reach the top ten. It was certified gold for sales exceeding 50,000 copies. Villain's second studio album, Radio Sakura was released on 8 March 2024. The album contains 12 tracks, including collaborations with Madame, Ernia, Bresh, Thasup, and Guè. Following the album's release, "Come un tuono" featuring Guè, achieved virality on TikTok and reached the number one of the Italian singles chart, ahead of its release as the album's third single on 29 March 2024. She also featured on the songs "Balenciaga", from Tony Effe's second album Icon, and "Non lo sai" by pop punk band La Sad. On 26 April, together with Tananai and Madame, she released the single "Ho fatto un sogno", a celebrative song for the 20th scudetto of soccer team Inter Milan. On 15 May, she founded together the publishing company Cash and Carter Music, with her husband Sixpm, administrated by Warner Chappell Music Italy. On 17 May, she featured on the comeback project of Italian band Finley, on the song "Killer" included on their mixtape Pogo Mixtape Vol. 1. In July, she was the opening act for Coldplay's Italian shows for their Music of the Spheres World Tour at the Stadio Olimpico. On August 30, after being defined by Italian media as one of the summer 2024 Italian hits, Villain released the Spanish version of the single "Come un tuono" (in Spanish "Como un trueno") featuring Blessd. On September 6, she collaborated with her husband Sixpm, for his single "My Love!" featuring Ernia and the SLF. On September 16, she received the Impact Award at the first Billboard Italia Women in Music.

=== 2025–present: Sanremo 2025 and Radio Vega ===
In December 2024, Rose Villain was announced as one of the participants in the Sanremo Music Festival 2025. She placed 19th with the song "Fuorilegge". Her third studio album, Radio Vega, was released on 14 March 2025.

== Musical influences ==
Villain is very inspired by film directors such as Quentin Tarantino, David Fincher, Stanley Kubrick, and Alfred Hitchcock. Her passion for criminology led her to attend courses in the United States. Those interests brought Villain to create her dark sound, which mix rock and hip hop; she also inspired by artists such as Nirvana, Guns N' Roses, The Rolling Stones, Johnny Cash, The Notorious B.I.G., 2Pac, Kanye West, Ty Dolla $ign, and Kid Cudi. Villain also said that she is inspired by Italian songwriter Lucio Battisti, saying that he is worth as much as The Beatles.

== Discography ==
- Radio Gotham (2023)
- Radio Sakura (2024)
- Radio Vega (2025)

== Tours ==
- 2022 − Rose Villain: Club tour
- 2023 − Radio Gotham tour
- 2023 − A Villain Story: The Beginning
- 2024 – Radio Sakura Summer tour
- 2025 – Radio Vega Summer tour
- 2025 – The Radio Trilogy tour

== Filmography ==
=== Television ===
Year	Title	Role	Notes
2020	Power Hits Estate	Performer	Performing "Chico"
2022	Love Mi	Performer	Performing "Michelle Pfieffer", "Chico", "Piango Sulla Lambo"
2023	Sanremo Music Festival 2023	Guest contestant	Performing "L'America" with Rosa Chemical (8th place)
2023	Le Iene	Co-Host	Variety show (season 28)
2023	Concerto del Primo Maggio	Performer	Annual Concert
2023	Love Mi	Performer	Performing "Fragole" with Achille Lauro
2023	TIM Summer Hits	Co-host/ Performer	Performing "Fragole" with Achille Lauro
2023	Battiti Live	Co-host/ Performer	Performing "Fragole" with Achille Lauro
2023	TIM Music Awards	Performer	Performing "Fantasmi", "Michelle Pfeiffer", "Cartoni animati"
2023	Gialappa Show	Co-host	Episode 2x07
2024	Nuova Scena - Rhythm + Flow Italia	Judge	Coach and pre-selection judge
2024	Sanremo Music Festival 2024	Contestant	"Click Boom!"
2025	Sanremo Music Festival 2025	Contestant	"Fuorilegge"

== Awards and nominations ==
- 2023 − TIM Music Award − Certified Gold Album − Radio Gotham − winner
- 2024 − TIM Music Award − Certified Platinum Album − Radio Sakura − winner
- 2024 − TIM Music Award − Certified Multiplatinum single − "Click Boom!" − winner
- 2024 − TIM Music Award − Certified Multiplatinum single − "Come un tuono" − winner
- 2024 − TIM Music Award − Special TIM Award
- 2024 – Billboard Italia Women in Music – Impact Awarad
