= Phantom (Geolier song) =

Single by Geolier featuring 50 Cent

from the album Tutto è possibile
- Released: 31 December 2025
- Genre: Hip hop
- Length: 2:52
- Label: Atlantic Italy; Warner Music Italy
- Songwriters: Emanuele Palumbo; Curtis James Jackson III
- Composers: Jacopo Lazzarini; Lorenzo Paolo Spinosa
- Producers: Lazza; Low Kidd

Geolier singles chronology
"081" (2025)	"Phantom" (2025)	"Canzone d'amore" (2026)

50 Cent singles chronology
"Fightland" (2025)	"Phantom" (2025)

Music video
- "Phantom" on YouTube

"Phantom" is a song by Italian rapper Geolier with featured vocals by American rapper 50 Cent. It was released on 31 December 2025 by Atlantic Italy and Warner Music Italy as the third single from Geolier's fourth studio album, Tutto è possibile.

== Description ==
The song, produced by Lazza and Low Kidd, featured vocals from American rapper 50 Cent.

== Music video ==
The music video, directed by Marlon Peña and shot in Miami at the Hard Rock Guitar Hotel, was released alongside the song on Geolier's YouTube channel.

== Charts ==
Weekly chart performance for "Phantom"
Chart (2026)	Peak position
Italy (FIMI)	1

== Certifications ==
Certifications for "Phantom"
Region	Certification	Certified units/sales
Italy (FIMI)	Gold	100,000^{‡}
^{‡} Sales+streaming figures based on certification alone.
