= Tutto è possibile (Geolier album) =

Studio album by Geolier
- Released: 16 January 2026
- Genre: Hip hop
- Length: 50:51
- Labels: Atlantic Italy; Warner Music Italy
- Producers: 1mind; Finesse; Kekko D'Alessio; Lazza; Lilia; Low Kidd; Poison Beatz; Voga; Weston Weiss; Yung Snapp

Geolier chronology
Dio lo sa (2024)	Tutto è possibile (2026)

Singles from Tutto è possibile
- 1. "Fotografia" Released: 7 November 2025; 2. "081" Released: 5 December 2025; 3. "Phantom" Released: 31 December 2025; 4. "Canzone d'amore" Released: 16 January 2026; 5. "Amen" Released: 19 January 2026; 6. "Stelle" Released: 17 April 2026

Tutto è possibile (transl. Everything is possible) is the fourth studio album by Italian rapper Geolier, released on 16 January 2026 by Atlantic Italy and Warner Music Italy.

== Description ==
The album, described as an emotional work, consists of sixteen tracks written by the rapper himself with the collaboration of authors and producers, including 1mind, Finesse, Kekko D'Alessio, Lazza, Lilia, Low Kidd, Poison Beatz, Sottomarino, Voga, Weston Weiss and Yung Snapp. It includes featured guest appearances by Italian rappers Anna, Sfera Ebbasta and Kid Yugi and Italian singer Pino Daniele as well as International collaborations with American rapper 50 Cent and Puerto Rican rapper Anuel AA.

== Track listing ==
Tutto è possibile track listing
No.	Title	Lyrics	Music	Producer(s)	Length
1.	"Tutto è possibile" (featuring Pino Daniele)	Emanuele Palumbo; Giuseppe Daniele; Paolo Antonacci; Davide Simonetta	Gennaro Petito; Vincenzo Marino	Poison Beatz; Sottomarino	3:07
2.	"Sonnambulo"	Palumbo	Antonio Lago; Petito; Marino	Poison Beatz; Sottomarino; Yung Snapp	3:03
3.	"2 giorni di fila" (featuring Sfera Ebbasta and Anna)	Palumbo; Anna Pepe; Gionata Boschetti	Lago; Petito; Marino	Finesse; Poison Beatz; Sottomarino; Yung Snapp	3:31
4.	"Facil facil"	Palumbo	Petito; Simone Capurro; Marino	Poison Beatz; Sottomarino; Starchild	2:28
5.	"1H"	Palumbo	Francesco D'Alessio; Petito; Marino	Kekko D'Alessio; Poison Beatz; Sottomarino	2:20
6.	"Un ricco e un povero"	Palumbo	D'Alessio; Petito; Marino	Kekko D'Alessio; Poison Beatz; Sottomarino	3:16
7.	"Olè" (featuring Kid Yugi)	Palumbo; Francesco Stasi	Petito; Marino; Albert Collins; Jesse Shatkin; Anthony Moses Davis; Sean Due Lashley	Poison Beatz; Sottomarino	3:05
8.	"Desiderio"	Palumbo	Lago; Petito; Marino	Poison Beatz; Sottomarino; Yung Snapp	3:17
9.	"Phantom" (featuring 50 Cent)	Palumbo; Curtis James Jackson III	Jacopo Lazzarini; Lorenzo Paolo Spinosa	Lazza; Low Kidd	2:52
10.	"P'forz"	Palumbo	Petito; Capurro; Marino	Poison Beatz; Sottomarino; Starchild	3:14
11.	"Stelle"	Palumbo; Federica Abbate	Ciro Palumbo; Emilia Vitale; Petito; Marino	Lilia; Poison Beatz; Sottomarino	3:26
12.	"Canzone d'amore"	Palumbo	Petito; Marino	Poison Beatz; Sottomarino	3:00
13.	"081"	Palumbo	Petito; Marino	Poison Beatz; Sottomarino	2:55
14.	"Arcobaleno" (featuring Anuel AA)	Palumbo; Emmanuel Gazmey Santiago	Petito; Marino; McCulloch Reid Sutphin; Weston Weiss	1mind; Poison Beatz; Sottomarino; Weston Weiss	3:13
15.	"Fotografia"	Palumbo; Davide Petrella	Petrella; Petito; Marino	Poison Beatz; Sottomarino	3:44
16.	"A Napoli non piove"	Palumbo	Lago; Petito; Marino	Poison Beatz; Sottomarino	4:14
Total length:					50:51

Tutto è possibile digital re-issue
No.	Title	Lyrics	Music	Producer(s)	Length
12.	"Amen" (freestyle)	Palumbo	Enrico Esposito; Lorenzo Biscione	Voga	2:41

== Charts ==
Weekly chart performance for Tutto è possibile
Chart (2026)	Peak position
Belgian Albums (Ultratop Wallonia)	192
Italian Albums (FIMI)	1
Swiss Albums (Schweizer Hitparade)	6

== Certifications ==
Certifications for Tutto è possibile
Region	Certification	Certified units/sales
Italy (FIMI)	5× Platinum	250,000^{‡}
^{‡} Sales+streaming figures based on certification alone.
