= Geolier =

Italian rapper (born 2000)

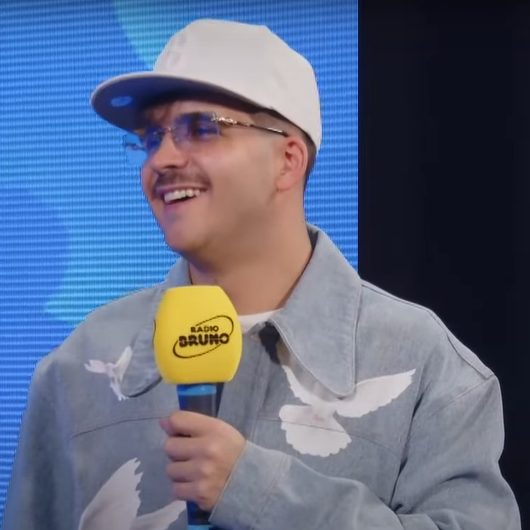
- Geolier in February 2024

Background information
- Born: Emanuele Palumbo; 23 March 2000 (age 26); Naples, Italy
- Genres: Hip hop; trap
- Occupation: Rapper
- Works: Discography
- Years active: 2018–present
- Labels: Island; BFM Music; Columbia; Warner Music Italy

Emanuele Palumbo (born 23 March 2000), known professionally as Geolier (Italian pronunciation: [ʒoˈlje]), is an Italian rapper.

== Life and career ==
=== 2018–2021: Breakthrough and Emanuele ===
Palumbo's stage name is derived from geôlier, French for "gaoler" translating in Italian as secondino, which is also a slang demonym for his native Secondigliano district of Naples. His debut single, "P Secondigliano", was released in 2018 with Nicola Siciliano. In the same year, he released other singles including "Mercedes", "Queen" and "Mexico". In 2019, Geolier signed a contract with BFM Music, founded by the rapper Luché, with which he released in October his debut album, Emanuele.

=== 2022–2023: Il coraggio dei bambini ===
On 28 October 2022, he released "Chiagne" with Lazza and Takagi & Ketra, as the lead single from his then upcoming second studio album. It was followed by the single "Money" on 18 November. On 6 January 2023, he released his second studio album, Il coraggio dei bambini, featuring collaborations with artists such as Sfera Ebbasta, Shiva, Guè, Marracash, Paky and Giorgia. On 3 March 2023, "Come vuoi" was released as the album's third single. The album was re-released as Il coraggio dei bambini - Atto II on 7 April 2023, with six additional tracks including collaborations with Giorgia and Marracash.

On 13 October 2023, Geolier featured alongside Anna and Shiva on Takagi & Ketra's single "Everyday". The song discusses themes of jealous and possessiveness in a relationship, and has been described as an urban ballad, telling the same story from three different points of view. The track debuted atop the Italian singles chart, remaining there for six weeks. It was certified double platinum in Italy for sales in excess of 200,000 copies.

=== 2024: Sanremo Music Festival and Dio lo sa ===
Geolier competed in the Sanremo Music Festival 2024 with the song "I p' me, tu p' te", ultimately coming second but he won the cover night with "Strade" (together with Gue, Luchè and Gigi D'Alessio). Through spring 2024, he released a further two singles: "L'ultima poesia", with Ultimo, and "El Pibe de Oro" ahead of the release of his third studio album, Dio lo sa, on 7 June 2024.

=== 2025–present: Tutto è possibile ===
On 7 November 2025 the single "Fotografia", was released, which debuted at the top of the Top Singles chart. On 5 December the single "081", was released, followed on 31 December by the single "Phantom" in collaboration with 50 Cent, which also topped the Top Singles chart.

On 16 January 2026 his fourth studio album Tutto è possibile was released, consisting of sixteen tracks, including six collaborations with 50 Cent, Anna, Anuel AA, Kid Yugi, Pino Daniele and Sfera Ebbasta. In conjunction with the release of the album, the song "Canzone d'amore" was released as a radio single.

== Personal life ==
Until mid-June 2024 Geolier was dating Italian influencer Valeria D'Agostino. He considers himself Roman Catholic.

== Discography ==
- Emanuele (2019)
- Il coraggio dei bambini (2023)
- Dio lo sa (2024)
- Tutto è possibile (2026)
