= Gaia discography =

Discography of Italian-Brazilian singer-songwriter Gaia

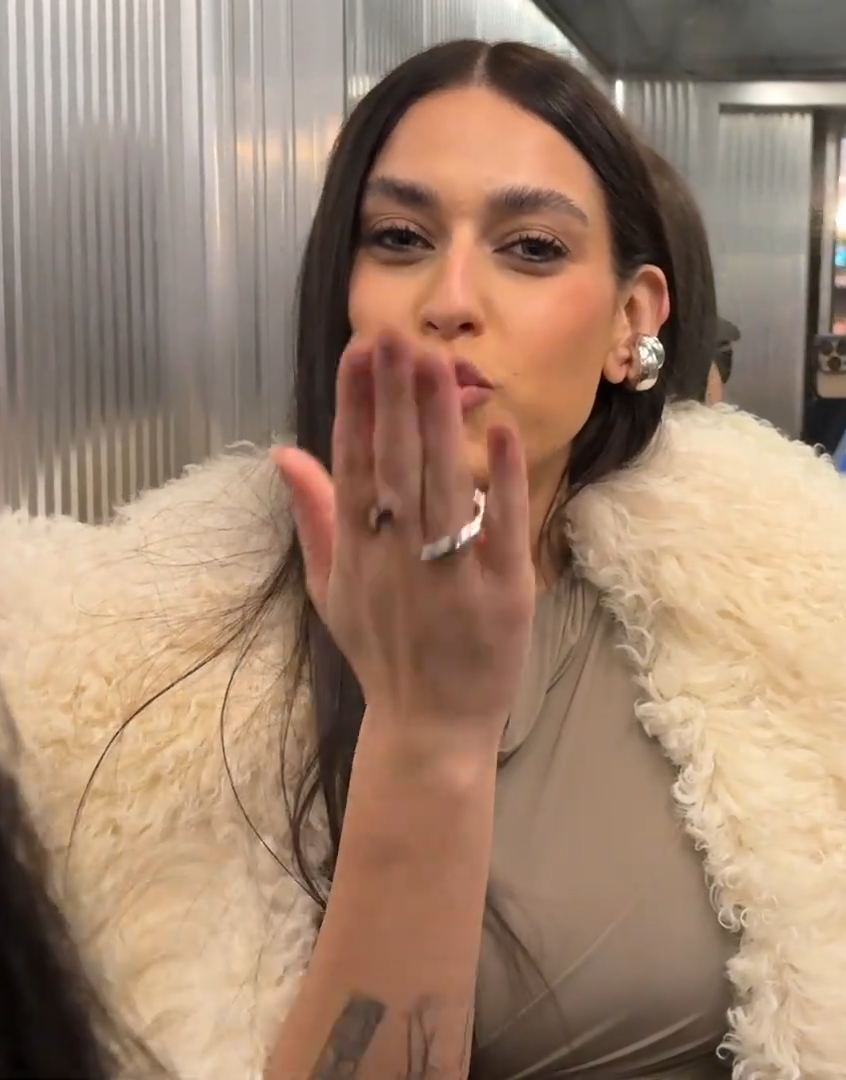
- Gaia in February 2025
- Studio albums: 3
- EPs: 1
- Singles: 24

The discography of Italian singer-songwriter Gaia consists of three studio albums, one EP and twenty-four singles.

== Studio albums ==
List of albums, with selected chart positions and certifications
Title	Album details	Peak chart positions		Certifications
Title	Album details	ITA	SWI	Certifications
Genesi	Released: 20 March 2020; Label: Sony Music; Format: CD, LP, digital download, streaming	3	68	FIMI: Gold
Alma	Released: 29 October 2021; Label: Sony Music; Format: CD, LP, digital download, streaming	18	—	
Rosa dei venti	Released: 21 March 2025; Label: Columbia Records, Sony Music; Format: CD, LP, digital download, streaming	6	—	
"—" denotes albums that did not chart or were not released.

== Extended plays ==
List of extended plays, with selected chart positions
Title	EP details	Peak chart positions
Title	EP details	ITA
New Dawns	Released: 16 December 2016; Label: Sony Music; Format: CD, digital download	29

== Singles ==
=== As lead artist ===
List of singles as lead artist, with chart positions and certifications, showing year released and album name
Title	Year	Peak chart positions		Certifications	Album
Title	Year	ITA	SWI	Certifications	Album
"New Dawns"	2016	7	—	FIMI: Gold	New Dawns
"Fotogramas"	2017	—	—		Non-album single
"Chega"	2020	11	—	FIMI: 2× Platinum	Genesi
"Coco Chanel"	2020	36	—	FIMI: Gold	Genesi
"Nuove strade" (with Ernia, Rkomi, Madame and Samurai Jay)	2020	51	—		Non-album single
"Cuore amaro"	2021	17	—	FIMI: Gold	Alma
"Boca" (with Sean Paul)	2021	69	—	FIMI: Gold	Alma
"Nuvole di zanzare"	2021	—	—		Alma
"What Christmas Means to Me"	2021	6	—	FIMI: Gold	Alma - Christmas Edition
"Salina"	2022	—	—		Alma
"Estasi"	2023	—	—		Non-album singles
"Tokyo"	2023	—	—		Non-album singles
"Dea saffica"	2024	—	—		Non-album singles
"Sesso e samba" (with Tony Effe)	2024	1	56	FIMI: 4× Platinum	Icon
"Chiamo io chiami tu"	2025	9	—	FIMI: Platinum	Rosa dei venti
"Nuda"	2025	67	—		Rosa dei venti
"Tropicalia" (with SKT)	2026	—	—		Non-album singles
"Bossa nostra"	2026	85	—		Non-album singles
"—" denotes singles that did not chart or were not released.

=== As featured artist ===
List of singles as featured artist, with chart positions and certifications, showing year released and album name
Title	Year	Peak chart positions	Album
Title	Year	ITA	Album
"Fé" (Stabber featuring Gaia)	2022	—	Trueno
"Fa strano (Lady Marmalade)" (BigMama featuring Gaia, Sissi and La Niña)	2024	—	Sangue
"I maschi" (Levante featuring Gaia)	2026	100	Dall'amore il fallimento e altri passi di danza
"—" denotes singles that did not chart or were not released.

== Other charted songs ==
List of songs, with chart positions, showing year released and album name
Title	Anno	Peak chart positions	Album or EP
Title	Anno	ITA	Album or EP
"Human"	2016	86	New Dawns
"Fucsia"	2020	81	Genesi

== Other appearances ==
List of non-singles guest appearances, with chart positions, album name and certifications
Single	Year	Peak chart positions	Certifications	Album
Single	Year	ITA	Certifications	Album
"Non siamo niente" (Lowlow feat. Gaia)	2020	—		Dogma 93
"Luna" (Madame featuring Gaia)	2021	35	FIMI: Gold	Madame
"Mare che non sei" (Rkomi featuring Gaia)	2021	30	FIMI: Gold	Taxi Driver
"Mosaici" (Sick Luke featuring Carl Brave and Gaia)	2022	24		X2
"Così non va" (The Night Skinny feat. Elisa, Gaia, Madame and Rkomi)	2022	60		Botox
"Bastava la metà" (Ernia featuring Gué Pequeno and Gaia)	2022	21		Io non ho paura
"Morto d'amore" (Dylan featuring Gaia)	2023	—		Love Is War
"Non ti vado via" (Aiello featuring Gaia)	2023	—		Romantico
"Lento lento lento" (VV featuring Gaia)	2023	—		Ami pensi sogni senti
"Una" (Ditonellapiaga featuring Gaia)	2024	—		Flash
"Non siamo più noi due" (Holden featuring Gaia)	2024	—		Joseph
"Tokitô" (Marina Sena featuring Gaia and Nenny)	2025	—		Coisas naturais
"Salsa piccante" (Fabri Fibra featuring Gaia and Massimo Pericolo)	2025	47		Mentre Los Angeles brucia
"Slow down" (Shablo featuring Gaia and Roy Woods)	2025	—		Manifesto
"Tudo bem" (Selton featuring Gaia)	2025	—		Gringo Vol.2
"Mai" (Ele A featuring Gaia)	2025	—		Pixel
"Il tuo male è il mio male" (Rose Villain featuring Gaia)	2025	—		Radio Vega (After Dark)
"Ciclone" (Elodie featuring Gaia)	2025	—		The Stadium Show (Live @ San Siro 2025)
"—" denotes songs that did not chart or were not released.
