= Nuda (disambiguation) =

Nuda is a class of ctenophores, or comb jellies, that includes the family Beroidae.

Nuda may also refer to:

- "Nuda" (Mina song), 1976 single by Mina
- Nuda (album), 2020 studio album by Annalisa
- "Nuda" (Gaia song), 2025 single by Gaia
