= Boca (Gaia and Sean Paul song) =

Single by Gaia and Sean Paul

from the album Alma
- Language: Portuguese
- Released: 14 May 2021
- Genre: Reggaeton; dancehall
- Length: 2:36
- Label: Sony
- Songwriters: Gaia Gozzi; Sean Paul Ryan Francis Henriques; Totó La Momposina; Don Hoitink; Antonio Fernández; Mimoum Steven Kwik; Steve Keanu Tandaju
- Producer: Childsplay

Gaia singles chronology
"Cuore amaro" (2021)	"Boca" (2021)	"Nuvole di zanzare" (2021)

Sean Paul singles chronology
"Pues" (2021)	"Boca" (2021)	"Only Fanz" (2021)

Music video
- "Boca" on YouTube

"Boca" is a song by Italian singer Gaia and Jamaican rapper Sean Paul. It was released on 14 May 2021 through Sony Music Italy, as the second single from Gaia's second studio album Alma.

== Composition ==
The single featured the collaboration of Jamaican singer Sean Paul with production by Childsplay. The song, in Portuguese and English, sempled the song "Qué Calor" by Major Lazer. "Boca" is the second single by Gaia in Portuguese since "Chega" from her debut album Genesi and have dancehall reggae and dance-pop sound influences.

== Music video ==
The music video for the song, directed by Francesco Calabrese, was released on June 29, 2020, through the singer's YouTube channel.

== Charts ==
Chart performance for Boca
Chart (2021)	Peak position
Italian Singles (FIMI)	69

== Certifications ==
Certifications for Boca
Region	Certification	Certified units/sales
Italy (FIMI)	Gold	35,000^{‡}
^{‡} Sales+streaming figures based on certification alone.
