= Vanessa Scalera =

Italian actress (born 1977)

- Born: 5 April 1977 (age 49); Mesagne, Italy
- Occupation: Actress

Vanessa Scalera (born 5 April 1977) is an Italian television, stage and film actress.

== Life and career ==
Born in Mesagne, Scalera is the daughter of two nurses. She grew up in Latiano, and in 1996 she moved with her family to Rome. She studied acting at La Scaletta drama school, under Antonio Pierfederici.

Scalera started her career on stage, working in 2000 in the comedy play L'amico di tutti, alongside Johnny Dorelli. In 2001, she made her film debut in Our Tropical Island. She had her breakout in 2019, thanks to the titular role in the Rai 1 crime series Imma Tataranni: Deputy Prosecutor.

For her performance in the 2021 film A Girl Returned, Scalera received a David di Donatello nomination for best supporting actress, and a Globo d'oro nomination as best actress.

== Filmography ==
=== Film ===
Year	Title	Role	Notes
2001	Our Tropical Island	Waitress	Uncredited
2008	Il nostro messia	Pauline	
2009	Vincere	Nun	Cameo
2012	Dormant Beauty	PD Deputy	Cameo
2014	Prima di andar via	Elena	
2015	Under Electric Clouds	Nurse	Cameo
2015	Mia Madre	Nurse	Cameo
2018	A Woman's Name	Sonia Talenti	
2019	Il ladro di giorni	Anna	
2021	A Girl Returned	The Mother	
2021	Diabolik	Flora	
2022	Corro da te	Luciana	
2022	I viaggiori	Dr. Sestrieri	
2023	Palazzina Laf	Tiziana Lagioia	
2024	Dall'alto di una fredda torre	Elena	
2024	Diamonds	Bianca Vega	
2026	Il bene comune	Raffaella	
2026	Il dio dell'amore	Esther	
2026	The Fire Within You		

=== Television ===
Year	Title	Role	Notes
2011	R.I.S. Roma: Delitti imperfetti	Angelo's mother	Episode: "Nella tranquillità delle vostre case"
2011	Squadra antimafia	Francesca Diamante	3 episodes
2012	Distretto di Polizia	Tania Nazzari	Episode: "Impunibile"
2015	Lea	Lea Garofalo	Television film
2019–2026	Imma Tataranni: Deputy Prosecutor	Immacolata "Imma" Tataranni	Lead role
2020–2022	Romulus	Silvia	Main (season 1); guest (season 2)
2022	Filumena Marturano	Filumena Marturano	Television film
2024	This Is Not Hollywood	Cosima Serrano	Main role
2025	My Family	Lucia	Main role
