= Imma Tataranni: Deputy Prosecutor =

- Genre: Detective fiction; Comedy-drama
- Based on: Imma Tataranni series by Mariolina Venezia
- Directed by: Francesco Amato; Kiko Rosati
- Starring: Vanessa Scalera; Massimiliano Gallo; Barbara Ronchi; Alessio Lapice; Carlo De Ruggeri; Carlo Buccirosso; Ester Pantano; Alice Azzariti; Rocco Papaleo
- Composer: Andrea Farri
- Country of origin: Italy
- Original language: Italian
- No. of seasons: 5
- No. of episodes: 26

Production
- Cinematography: Roberto Forza; Lorenzo Adorisio
- Editor: Claudio Di Mauro

Original release
- Network: Rai 1
- Release: September 22, 2019 – March 29, 2026

Imma Tataranni: Deputy Prosecutor (Italian: Imma Tataranni – Sostituto procuratore) is an Italian mystery comedy-drama series starring Vanessa Scalera in the title role. The series is based on the Imma Tataranni series of detective novels by Mariolina Venezia. Broadcast on Rai 1 since 2019, it is set in Matera and was shot in Matera and in other Basilicata cities. New Season 6 coming December 2026.

== Plot ==
Imma Tataranni is a deputy prosecutor of the Public Prosecutor's Office of Matera, endowed with a prodigious memory and used to solving the cases entrusted to her with unorthodox methods.

== Cast ==
=== Main ===
- Vanessa Scalera as Imma Tataranni, a public deputy prosecutor
- Massimiliano Gallo as Pietro De Ruggeri, Imma's husband
- Alessio Lapice as Ippazio Calogiuri, a Marshal in the Carabinieri who works closely with Imma (seasons 1–3)
- Barbara Ronchi as Diana De Santis, Imma's assistant and former schoolmate
- Monica Dugo as Maria Moliterni, Imma's colleague in the prosecutor's office and wife of the local prefect
- Dora Romano as Pietro's mother
- Lucia Zotti as Imma's mother (seasons 1–3)
- Carlo De Ruggieri as Doctor Taccardi, the local coroner
- Alice Azzariti as Valentina De Ruggeri, Imma and Pietro's daughter (seasons 1–3)
- Cesare Bocci as Saverio Romaniello (seasons 1–2, guest seasons 3–4)
- Carlo Buccirosso as Alessandro Vitali, Imma's new supervisor (seasons 1–2, guest season 3)
- Gianni Lillo as Capozza (seasons 1–3)
- Ester Pantano as Jessica Matarazzo (seasons 1–2, guest season 3)

=== Recurring ===
- Giuseppe Ragone as Zazza, an unscrupulous local reporter (seasons 1–3)
- Elvira Zingone as P.M. D'Antonio, Imma's frosty colleague (seasons 1–3)
- Annamaria De Luca as Porzia, the cleaning lady at the prosecutors' office (seasons 1–2)
- Guendalina Losito as Bea Vega, Valentina's friend from school (seasons 1–2)
- Nando Irene as Marshal Domenico La Macchia (seasons 1–3)
- Ilir Jacellari as Badante Nikolaus, Imma's mother's caregiver (seasons 1–2)
- Pier Giorgio Bellocchio as Giulio Bruno (season 2, guest season 1)

== Series overview ==
Series	Episodes		Originally released	
Series	Episodes		First released	Last released
1	6		22 September 2019	27 October 2019
2	8	4	26 October 2021	9 November 2021
2	8	4	27 September 2022	13 October 2022
3	4		25 September 2023	16 October 2023
4	4		23 February 2025	16 March 2025
5	4		TBA	TBA

== Episodes ==
=== Season 1 ===
No. overall	No. in season	Title	Directed by	Written by	Original release date
1	1	"Summer of the Finger" (L'estate del dito)	Francesco Amato	Mariolina Venezia, Salvatore De Mola Pier Paolo Piciarelli	22 September 2019
Deputy Prosecutor Imma Tataranni's beach vacation with her husband, Pietro De Ruggeri, and teenage daughter, Valentina, is interrupted by the discovery of a woman's severed body parts in various locations. Tataranni's new supervisor, Alessandro Vitali, cannot understand why she would neglect her womanly domestic duties for such a demanding career. Tataranni and her young protégé, Ippazio Calogiuri, connect the victim, a Moroccan prostitute named Aida, to both Sergio Covaser, a film star, and Vaccaro, the owner of a local bar. Worried about her daughter's safety, Tataranni humiliates Valentina by pulling her out of the bar in front of everyone. Investigating the crime scenes, Tataranni and Calogiuri arrest an abusive farm manager who has been intimidating and assaulting his female workers. Tataranni realizes that Saverio Romaniello, whose foundation administers the farm, murdered Aida and had her pimp, Vaccaro, clean it up. Vaccaro disappears, but Tataranni and Calogiuri find DNA evidence on his boat that implicates Romaniello.
2	2	"Like Plants Among the Rocks" (Come piante fra i sassi)	Francesco Amato	Mariolina Venezia, Salvatore De Mola, Michele Pellegrini, Pier Paolo Piciarelli	29 September 2019
A young man, Nunzio Festa, is murdered near his father's farm. Tataranni notifies his girlfriend, Milena, and learns that both she and her brother, Carmine, argued with Nunzio the night he died. Local officer La Macchia jumps to one conclusion after another as he interviews people connected to the incident. Valentina gets in trouble with her friend Bea, who Tataranni believes is a bad influence. Valentina is furious when Tataranni forbids her to go to a concert with Bea, and is hurt when Bea immediately sells the ticket. Romaniello is able to delay the murder trial against him. Tataranni and Calogiuri learn that Nunzio had been working with quirky Manolo Pentasuglia to dig up ancient artifacts in the area and sell them to collectors. It is revealed that Nunzio was the emissary for criminals who were paying local farmers to illegally bury toxic nuclear waste on their land. Tataranni deduces that Nunzio's father, Rosario Festa, impulsively killed his own son when he learned that Nunzio had made such a deal for his land behind his back. Tataranni takes Valentina to the concert.
3	3	"The Gardens of Memory" (I giardini della memoria)	Francesco Amato	Mariolina Venezia, Salvatore De Mola, Luca Vendruscolo, Pier Paolo Piciarelli	6 October 2019
The body of an architect missing for 15 years, Domenico Bruno, is found in a ravine. Tataranni learns that Domenico and his son, Giulio, clashed over Pietro's plans to develop housing near where his body was found. A brash and attractive new recruit, Jessica Matarazzo, bonds with Calogiuri. Tataranni questions Domenico's former lover, who is married with a daughter and kills himself when the press names him as a suspect in the murder, though he is not. Tataranni tries to hide her emotions as Calogiuri goes to Rome to take his officer's test, which will keep him away from Matera for months of training if he passes. Tataranni tracks down Domenico's estranged brother, Santino, and brings him in for questioning. Domenico had given his brother 100,000 euros before his disappearance, and then Santino moved to Argentina. Tataranni realizes that Santino is actually Domenico. He confesses that Santino attacked him when he revealed his homosexuality, and Domenico had killed him. He decided to start a new life with the money he had given Santino, and assumed his brother's identity.
4	4	"Bad Weather" (Maltempo)	Francesco Amato	Mariolina Venezia, Salvatore De Mola, Pier Paolo Piciarelli	13 October 2019
Aspiring reporter Donata Miulli is found dead after presumably jumping off a cliff. She had previously come to Tataranni with information about her ex-lover, Deputy Luigi Lombardi, a presidential candidate in Basilicata, so Tataranni investigates. Donata's recorder is found, revealing that Lombardi broke off the affair when he realized that Donata was his biological daughter. Traveling to Rome, Tataranni enlists Calogiuri in the investigation. He befriends Donata's friend, Maddalena Bartoli. Tataranni learns that Donata coldly tried to blackmail Lombardi on the phone, and then attempted to sell the recording to his political opponent. Tataranni discovers that Lombardi was mistaken, and Donata was not his daughter. Calogiuri, who has started dating Maddalena, cannot accept Tataranni's theory that Maddalena impersonated Donata and then killed her. She later confesses to him playfully in bed, and a tearful Calogiuri watches as his colleagues come out of hiding and arrest her.
5	5	"Serra District Friday" (Rione Serra Venerdì)	Francesco Amato	Mariolina Venezia, Salvatore De Mola, Michele Pellegrini, Pier Paolo Piciarelli	20 October 2019
Stella Pisicchio, a former classmate of Tataranni and Diana, is strangled to death in her apartment. Tataranni and Calogiuri interview Gaetano De Nardis, who says Stella stalked him after a bad date. He claims he went to her apartment the day she died to tell her to stop, but she did not answer the door. Father Mariano obtains photos of Romaniello, Lombardi, Giulio Bruno, attorneys Zakary and Angelo Latronico, and a sixth man meeting. Tataranni and Calogiuri discover that Stella attempted to extort De Nardis with information that would prevent the sale of his house. They soon learn that Stella had reconnected with Francesco Calenzano, a married man whom she knew when they were young. He confesses to Tataranni and Calogiuri that he changed his mind about having sex with her, and she tried to stop him from leaving her apartment. Calenzano strangled her in a nervous rage and fled as De Nardis knocked on her door.
6	6	"On the Side of the Last" (Dalla parte degli ultimi)	Francesco Amato	Mariolina Venezia, Salvatore De Mola, Luca Vendruscolo, Pier Paolo Piciarelli	27 October 2019
Father Mariano calls Tataranni requesting an emergency meeting, but Pietro is ill and she and Valentina bring him to the hospital. Later, Tataranni learns that Mariano has been killed in a suspicious hit and run. Tataranni learns that Pietro had dinner with Cinzia and lied to her. Tataranni and Calogiuri learn more about the many people Mariano helped, including construction magnate Antonio Scaglione. They also learn that Mariano had made several enemies. Pasquale Iannuzzi, a man who threatened Mariano for sheltering his abused wife, confesses to killing him. Tataranni believes he is covering for someone else, so a frustrated Vitali takes over the case. Iannuzzi is subsequently stabbed in jail, escapes the hospital and is killed by a Mafia hitman. Tataranni learns that Iannuzzi had terminal leukemia, likely caused by transporting toxic waste, and had led Mariano to another dump site. She is also told about Mariano's photos, and discovers that Bruno's residential project connects the five men and a sixth: Scaglione. He is horrified to learn about the toxic waste dumping and Iannuzzi's leukemia. Scaglione sends Tataranni the evidence Mariano has collected on the conspirators, and hangs himself. Tataranni and Calogiuri kiss.

=== Season 2 ===
No. overall	No. in season	Title	Directed by	Written by	Original release date
Part 1
7	1	"Wives and Oxen" (Mogli e buoi)	Francesco Amato	Salvatore De Mola, Pier Paolo Piciarelli, Francesco Amato	26 October 2021
Angelo Saraceno, a wealthy expat who returned to Basilicata from the US, is found shot dead along a seasonal cattle migration path. While the local police focus entirely on a turf war among cattle breeders over synthetic feed, Imma uses her signature blunt interrogation style on the victim's defensive family. She uncovers a hidden personal motive: Angelo was secretly the biological father of Peppino, a local deaf boy. By connecting old birth records to Angelo’s sudden return, Imma realizes the boy's legal father, Rocco, murdered the expat in a fit of protective rage to prevent him from taking the boy back to America. On the personal side of things, Calogiuri confesses to Imma that their previous kiss was the most beautiful moment of his life, but Imma insists it was a mistake. Meanwhile, Pietro announces he wants to quit his IT job to open a jazz club.
8	2	"Road to Redemption" (Via del riscatto)	Francesco Amato	Michele Pellegrini, Francesco Amato	2 November 2021
Real estate agent Luciano Ribba is found shot through the heart inside the historic, allegedly haunted Palazzo Sinagra. The town blames local superstitions and ghosts, but Imma completely dismisses the supernatural angle and aggressively audits Ribba’s financial ledgers. Her deep dive reveals a high-stakes real estate fraud scheme; Ribba was intentionally exploiting the "haunted" rumors to drive down the property's value for a hostile buyout. Imma pieces together that Ribba was murdered by his own business partner after threatening to back out and expose the fraudulent circle. On the personal side of things, the investigation forces Imma to balance superstitious local rumors with concrete financial records, while Pietro grows obsessed with his new business venue.
9	3	"From Rocks to Stars" (Dai sassi alle stelle)	Francesco Amato	Luca Vendruscolo, Francesco Amato	8 November 2021
Marta Ventura, a brilliant researcher at the Matera Space Geodesy Centre, is found murdered. The directors try to steer the investigation toward professional jealousy over a highly coveted research grant, but Imma’s sharp instincts tell her the academic rivalry is a smokescreen. She personally raids the center's servers and discovers that Marta had uncovered an illegal data-tampering scheme. Imma corners a senior colleague, proving he murdered Marta to stop her from exposing how he falsified atmospheric data to cover up toxic environmental violations committed by a powerful local construction company. At home, tensions rise as Valentina gets deeper into radical environmental activism, causing domestic friction. Meanwhile, the personal chemistry between Imma and Calogiuri continues to hum under the surface.
10	4	"A Better World Than This" (Un mondo migliore di questo)	Francesco Amato	Salvatore De Mola, Pier Paolo Piciarelli, Francesco Amato	9 November 2021
What begins as a routine domestic theft case spirals into a massive conspiracy when a whistleblower attempting to pass documents to the police is silenced. Refusing to back down despite heavy political pressure from her superiors, Imma follows the paper trail of a seemingly minor stolen luxury item. Her relentless digging uncovers a massive network of powerful white-collar criminals and local politicians. Imma exposes the core of the crime: the politicians were taking hefty bribes to look the other way while illegal toxic waste was systematically dumped onto protected agricultural land. The mid-season finale ends on a high-stress note. Imma’s relentless pursuit of mob-tied businessman Saverio Romaniello makes her household a target, putting an intense strain on her marriage to Pietro.
Part 2
11	5	"The Weight of the Soul" (Il peso dell'anima)	Francesco Amato	Salvatore De Mola, Pier Paolo Piciarelli, Francesco Amato	27 September 2022
On the eve of Good Friday, a high-ranking mafioso decides to turn state's witness, but a key informant is brutally executed before they can testify. Recognizing that the hit required highly classified timing, Imma turns her analytical gaze inward on her own department. By meticulously tracking the leak, she bypasses the mafia's outer layers and exposes a corrupt ring of law enforcement officials on the syndicate's payroll. She proves the execution was ordered from inside the prison system to permanently silence the witness before he could give Imma the names of these dirty cops. Meanwhile, Calogiuri enters a serious relationship with Jessica, triggering a wave of unacknowledged jealousy in Imma. At the same time, Pietro's jazz club finally opens.
12	6	"The Double Life of Mister E." (La doppia vita di Mister E.)	Francesco Amato	Salvatore De Mola, Luca Vendruscolo, Francesco Amato	29 September 2022
ohn Gardiner, an upscale British businessman known locally as "Mr. E," is found dead in his luxury hotel room. The local authorities treat it as a robbery gone wrong, but Imma notices discrepancies in the victim's elite lifestyle and begins digging into his international travels. She uncovers that Gardiner was actually a corporate spy blackmailing local manufacturing executives. Imma coordinates a sting that reveals the true killer: a prominent local industrialist who murdered Gardiner to stop him from leaking stolen corporate secrets to global competitors. While tracking the victim's double life, Imma is forced to look at her own. Pietro becomes increasingly suspicious of the late-night texts and unspoken bond between his wife and Calogiuri.
13	7	"Angel or Devil" (Angelo o diavolo)	Francesco Amato	Michele Pellegrini, Pier Paolo Piciarelli, Francesco Amato	6 October 2022
Romolo Sanni, a beloved elderly local philanthropist, is brutally murdered in his home. While the entire town of Matera mourns an "angel," Imma remains characteristically cynical and privately audits Sanni’s charitable foundation. Her distrust pays off when she uncovers a predatory, illegal loan-sharking operation hidden beneath the charity. Imma tracks down the suspects by looking for desperate families who had recently lost their homes to Sanni's usurious rates, ultimately extracting a confession from a heartbroken father who killed the philanthropist to save his family from ruin. Valentina’s rebellious choices reach a boiling point, forcing Imma and Pietro to briefly unite. A major career opportunity for Calogiuri threatens to take him away from Matera permanently.
14	8	"The Woman Who Lost Her Head" (La donna che perse la testa)	Francesco Amato	Salvatore De Mola, Pier Paolo Piciarelli, Francesco Amato	13 October 2022
The season finale revolves around the grotesque decapitation of Baroness Giuseppina Malvezzi in her historic estate. Imma pieces together the puzzle by aggressively interviewing the old nobility circles and linking the crime back to her ongoing Romaniello trial. She discovers that the Baroness had recently rewritten her will to disinherit her family. Imma proves that the Baroness's estranged nephew, drowning in gambling debts tied to the Romaniello syndicate, killed his aunt to destroy the new will before it could be finalized. Everything shatters in the final minutes: Pietro receives anonymous photos of Imma and Calogiuri's past kiss and abandons her, ending their marriage. Simultaneously, the mafia retaliates against Imma's investigation, and Calogiuri is shot in an ambush, leaving him in a life-or-death situation as the season ends.

=== Season 3 ===
No. overall	No. in season	Title	Directed by	Written by	Original release date
15	1	"Out of Sight" (Lontano dagli occhi)	Francesco Amato	Salvatore De Mola, Francesco Amato	25 September 2023
16	2	"Deliver Us from Evil" (Liberaci dal male)	Kiko Rosati	Pierpaolo Pirone, Francesco Amato	2 October 2023
17	3	"Thieves of the Future" (Ladri di futuro)	Kiko Rosati	Michele Pellegrini, Francesco Amato	9 October 2023
18	4	"The Price of Freedom" (Il prezzo della libertà)	Francesco Amato	Pier Paolo Piciarelli, Francesco Amato	16 October 2023

=== Season 4 ===
No. overall	No. in season	Title	Directed by	Written by	Original release date
19	1	"Try Again, Imma" (Provaci ancora, Imma)	Francesco Amato	Michele Pellegrini, Salvatore De Mola, Francesco Amato	23 February 2025
20	2	"Impossible Loves" (Amori impossibili)	Francesco Amato	Pier Paolo Piciarelli, Francesco Amato	2 March 2025
21	3	"When a Love Ends" (Quando finisce un amore)	Francesco Amato	Pierpaolo Pirone, Pier Paolo Piciarelli, Salvatore De Mola, with Francesco Amato	9 March 2025
22	4	"Forever Is a Saying" (Per sempre è un modo di dire)	Francesco Amato	Filippo Gili, Pier Paolo Piciarelli, Salvatore De Mola, with Francesco Amato	16 March 2025

=== Season 5 ===
No. overall	No. in season	Title	Directed by	Written by	Original release date
23	1	(Liberi tutti)	Francesco Amato	Unknown	8 March 2026
24	2	(Figli e figliastri)	Francesco Amato	Unknown	16 March 2026
25	3	(La colpa si sconta vivendo)	Francesco Amato	Unknown	22 March 2026
26	4	(Nessuno si salva da solo)	Francesco Amato	Unknown	29 March 2026
