= La Niña (singer) =

Italian singer-songwriter (born 1991)

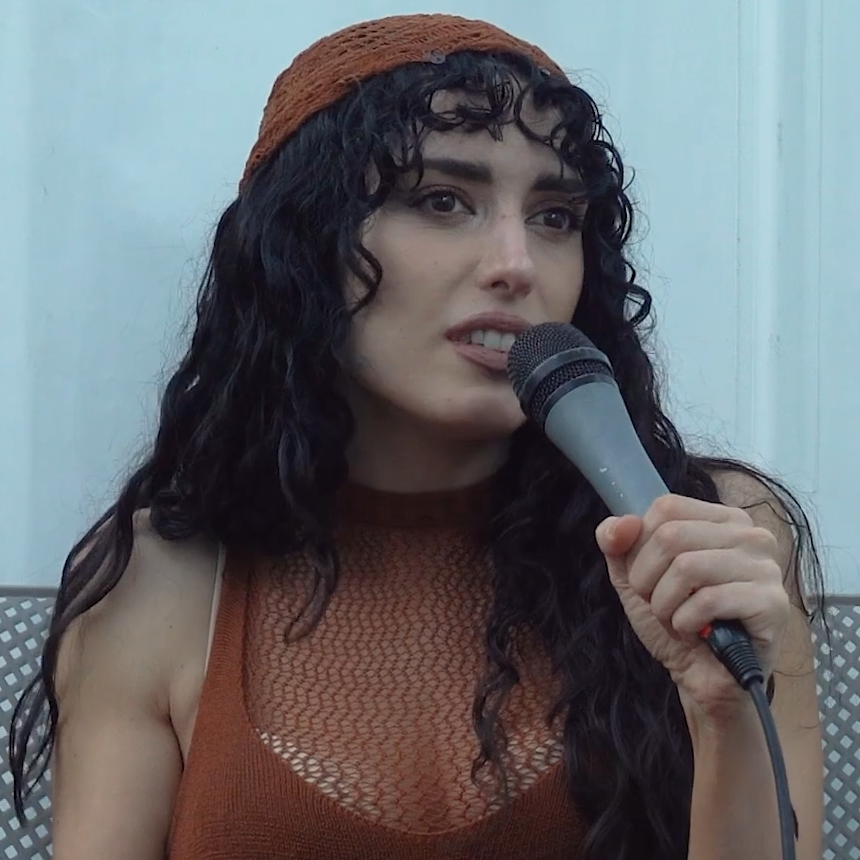
- La Niña in June 2026

Background information
- Also known as: Cyen
- Born: Carola Moccia; 10 July 1991 (age 35); Naples, Italy
- Origin: San Giorgio a Cremano, Naples, Italy
- Genres: Pop; folk-pop; canzone napoletana; alternative R&B; electronic
- Occupations: Singer; songwriter; instrumentalist; actress
- Instruments: Vocals; guitar; percussions
- Years active: 2012–present
- Labels: Carosello Records (2016–2018); La Tempesta Dischi (2019); Columbia / Sony Music Italy (2020–2023); BMG Rights Management Italy (2024–present)
- Publisher: Sugar Music (2021–present)
- Formerly of: Fitness Forever (2014); Yombe (2015–2018)
- Partner: Alfredo Maddaluno (2014–present)
- Awards: Targa Tenco (2025); Premio Lunezia Elite (2025)

Carola Moccia (born 10 July 1991), known professionally as La Niña, is an Italian singer-songwriter and actress.

== Early life and education ==
Carola Moccia was born in Naples and grew up in nearby San Giorgio a Cremano. She took up a passion for music from her musician father and her artist mother, learning to play the guitar and starting to compose at a young age.

She attended liceo scientifico and later graduated in philosophy and history from the University of Naples Federico II. After moving to Milan to focus on her music, she received a postgraduate degree in musical communication from the Università Cattolica del Sacro Cuore.

== Career ==
=== Early career ===
During her high school and undergraduate university years in Naples, Moccia began collaborating with performers including Jovine of 99 Posse and Roberto Angelini, thanks to whom she performed twice on the TV show Gazebo.

In 2014, in Naples, she participated in the project Fitness Forever as a guitarist and vocalist, meeting musician and producer Alfredo Maddaluno (stage name KWSK Ninja), with whom she would start both a professional and personal relationship.

=== 2015–2018: Yombe ===
In 2015, in Milan, Moccia (using the stage name Cyen) and Maddaluno formed the duo Yombe, briefly residing in London before moving back to Italy. The couple shared a flat with Colapesce, a friend and collaborator of Maddaluno, in the Milanese neighborhood of Lambrate. Yombe – whose name was inspired by a Yombe maternity figure displayed at a Mudec exhibition – debuted with "Vulkaan", the lead single from an eponymous 2016 EP. After touring Italy and international festivals, and publishing a second single, they signed a contract with Carosello Records. Other singles followed in 2017, which were then included in the album Goood. They performed as opening act in concerts by Ghemon and Little Dragon. At the end of their contract with Carosello in 2018, Yombe disbanded to experiment new music.

=== 2019–2022: Solo debut ===
Upon the end of their duo project, Moccia and Maddaluno moved back to Naples, where they shifted from English-language music to songwriting in Neapolitan. She signed with La Tempesta Dischi, and made her solo debut as La Niña in June 2019 with the single "Croce", followed in September by "Niente cchiù" and in December by "Salomè", all three co-written and produced by Maddaluno as KWSK Ninja. In the same period, she made an appearance in the official video for a new version of "Le ragazze di Porta Venezia" by Myss Keta.

Moccia moved to the Sony Music Italy label in 2020 and signed a publishing contract with Sugar Music in 2021. Early that year, she released the single "'Na cosa sola" and the EP Eden, followed by the duets "Lassame sta'" and "Tu", with Gemitaiz and Franco Ricciardi, respectively. In October 2021, she took part with Ginevra and Priestess in the Anemone Film and Amazon Music short film La notte delle lumere. In 2022, Moccia collaborated with other artists, including Clementino, Ensi, Peppe Barra, Myss Keta and BigMama, and later with Tosca. She was featured on the Rai 2 show Bar Stella.

=== 2023–2024: Television debut ===
In February 2023, La Niña released "Blu" – featuring British singer Mysie – as the lead single from her debut album Vanitas, shortly followed by "Harakiri". The album, once again produced by KWSK Ninja, was met with critical acclaim.

The same year, she made her first appearance as an actress in the Canale 5 televised series La voce che hai dentro, created by and starring Massimo Ranieri. She was also the main composer behind the series' soundtrack.

Following the start of a new contract with BMG Italy in early 2024, La Niña was a guest on the cover night of the 74th Sanremo Music Festival, performing "Lady Marmalade" alongside Gaia and Sissi in duet with main contestant BigMama.

=== 2025–present: Furèsta ===
In January 2025, La Niña released "Guapparìa", the lead single from her upcoming second album Furèsta, centered on Neapolitan organized crime (historical guapparia and the modern Camorra). The album release was preceded by other singles, namely "Mammama'" and "Figlia d' 'a tempesta". Like the previous album, Furèsta was also well received by critics and public alike. Almost entirely written and produced by Moccia and Maddaluno, the album features Matteo Parisi as the co-author of some of the tracks and the participation of Arab artists Kukii and Abdullah Miniawy on two of them. The composition drew inspiration from Baroque and Mediterranean music (particularly tammurriata), marking a change from the electronic style of La Niña's older works. In July 2025, she was awarded the prestigious Targa Tenco (for best album in a regional language) and Premio Lunezia Elite. The following October, Moccia embarked on a European tour to promote the album.

For composing the score to The Fire Within You by Edoardo De Angelis, Moccia and Maddaluno were awarded the Soundtrack Stars Award for Best Soundtrack at the 83rd Venice Film Festival in September 2026.

== Musical influences ==
Rolling Stone Italia described La Niña as "a hybrid between Teresa De Sio and Rosalía". The singer herself has cited influences from FKA Twigs, Doja Cat, Roberto Murolo, Gilda Mignonette, Pino Daniele, Almamegretta, M.I.A., Lafawndah, Sevdaliza, Carmen Consoli and Caroline Polachek.

== Personal life ==
Moccia has been in a relationship with her collaborator Alfredo Maddaluno since 2014. As of 2024, the couple lives in Naples.

== Discography ==
=== As a solo artist ===
==== Albums ====
- Vanitas – 2023
- Furèsta – 2025

==== EPs ====
- Eden – 2021

==== Singles ====
- "Croce" – 2019
- "Niente cchiù" – 2019
- "Salomè" – 2019
- "Fortuna" – 2020
- "'Na cosa sola" – 2021
- "Lassame sta'" (feat. Gemitaiz) – 2021
- "Tu" (with Franco Ricciardi) – 2021
- "Nunn 'o voglio sape'" – 2022
- "Blu" (feat. Mysie) – 2023
- "Harakiri" – 2023
- "Guapparìa" – 2025
- "Mammama'" – 2025
- "Figlia d' 'a tempesta" – 2025

===== As a featured artist =====
- "Fa strano (Lady Marmalade)" (BigMama feat. Gaia, La Niña and Sissi) – 2024

==== Original score ====
Year	English title	Original title	Notes
2026	The Fire Within You	Il fuoco che ti porti dentro	

=== As part of Yombe ===
==== Albums ====
- Goood – 2017

==== EPs ====
- Yombe – 2016

==== Singles ====
- "Vulkaan" – 2015
- "Tonight" – 2017
- "Nothing New to Me" – 2017
- "My Veins are Roads" – 2018

== Filmography ==
=== Films ===
Year	Title	Role	Notes
2021	La notte delle lumere	Herself	Musical short film

=== Television ===
Year(s)	Channel	Title	Role	Notes
2021–2022	Rai 2	Bar Stella	Herself	Variety show
2023	Canale 5	La voce che hai dentro	Regina	Drama series
