= Vittorio Camardese =

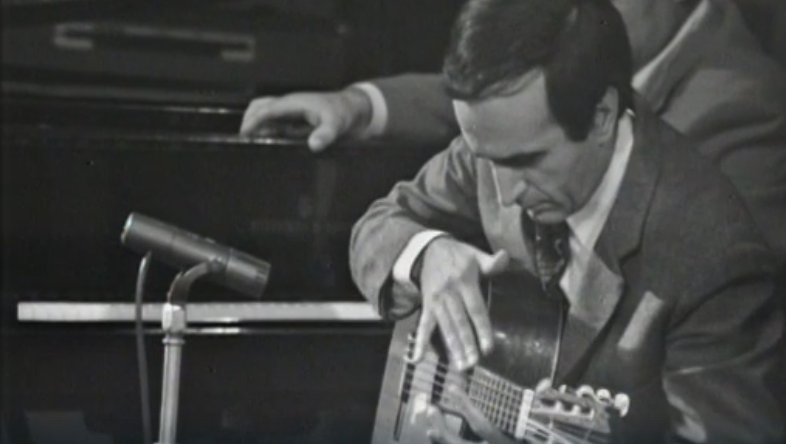
- Vittorio Camardese in 1970

Background information
- Born: July 6, 1929; Potenza, Italy
- Died: July 2, 2010 (aged 80) Potenza, Italy
- Occupations: Physician, musician
- Instrument: Guitar
- Years active: 1953–1978
- Website: www.vittoriocamardese.com

Vittorio Camardese (6 July 1929 – 2 July 2010) was an Italian guitarist and physician, most famous among musicians and general audiences for his 'tapping' style of guitar playing.

== Biography ==
After attending high school in Potenza, Camardese moved to Rome to undertake higher studies. He graduated in medicine, specializing in radiology, then began professional medical practice at the Ospedale S. Filippo Neri in Rome, later working at the Policlinico Umberto I, also in Rome.

He evolved his musical style through teaching himself, and in amateur performances. But in 1956, he played on the RAI Italian television talent show Primo applauso, his first television appearance, in which he won first prize. The television programme Chitarra, amore mio featured him in 1965, and he was seen again in 1973 in the music-based talk show Speciale per voi.

He regularly visited two of Rome's most important jazz venues, the Music Inn and Folkstudio. Here, he joined several famous musicians in performances, including Chet Baker, Tony Scott, Joe Venuti, Lelio Luttazzi, Romano Mussolini and Irio de Paula.

In 1978 he met his partner with whom he remained for 18 years. At the time, she had a three-year-old son, Roberto Angelini, who went on to become a singer and songwriter. The same year also saw Camardese's final television appearance. His shy and modest nature, together with the pressure of performing on live television, caused him to turn down further requests for such shows.

Camardese died on July 2, 2010, four days before turning 81.

== Media ==
Camardese's performances are poorly documented. The only widely-available film of his playing is his performance Chitarra, amore mio, rebroadcast in later years by the Italian state broadcaster RAI. In this recording, Camardese's distinctive tapping style is clearly evident, where the fingers of the right hand strike the strings on the guitar neck, creating the musical notes and other sounds.

== Film ==
A project to document Camardese's life and work is (as of May 2016) seeking funding. Its publicity is presented by Roberto Angelini, the son of Camardese's partner.
