= Chiamo io chiami tu =

Single by Gaia

from the album Rosa dei venti
- Language: Italian
- Released: 12 February 2025
- Genre: Dance-pop
- Length: 3:38
- Label: Columbia
- Songwriters: Gaia Gozzi; Davide Petrella; Stefano Tognini
- Producers: MadFingerz; Zef

Gaia singles chronology
"Sesso e samba" (2024)	"Chiamo io chiami tu" (2025)	"Nuda" (2025)

Music video
- "Chiamo io chiami tu" on YouTube

"Chiamo io chiami tu" (Italian pronunciation: [ˈkjaːmo ˈiːo ˈkjaːmi ˈtu]; "I call, you call") is a song co-written and recorded by Italian singer Gaia. It was released on 12 February 2025 by Columbia as the lead single from her third studio album, Rosa dei venti.

The song competed during the Sanremo Music Festival 2025, finishing in 26th position. It marked the singer's second participation on the contest, previously participating with "Cuore amaro" in 2021.

== Composition ==
The song, written by the singer-songwriter herself with Davide Petrella and is produced by MadFingerz and Zef. The song was described in a press conference:

""Chiamo io chiami tu" is about that limbo of indecision that wears out our brains and does not bring us back into our most primal feeling and instincts. That's my whole reading of it. It's actually a mega-light, super danceable song, but it has a subtext that, if you listen a little bit harder, vertically, you can pick up on. If the song was a painting, or a drawing."

== Critical reception ==
"Chiamo io chiami tu" received mixed-to-positive reviews from music critics.

Andrea Laffranchi of Corriere della Sera wrote that although the Latin sounds may not be convincing, "Gaia instead puts in elegance and a sensual voice". Gianni Sibilla of Rockol described the song as having a "reggaeton rhythm and repeating refrain", however, not finding it particularly original. In a favorable review by All Music Italia, Alvise Salerno stated that the song is the singer's "artistic revenge", appreciating the choice of sounds.

== Music video ==
The video for the song was released on 12 February 2025 on the singer's official YouTube channel. The video was directed by Simone Peluso.

== Charts ==
=== Weekly charts ===
Weekly chart performance for "Chiamo io chiami tu"
Chart (2025)	Peak position
Italy (FIMI)	9
Italy Airplay (EarOne)	1

=== Year-end charts ===
Year-end chart performance for "Chiamo io chiami tu"
Chart (2025)	Position
Italy (FIMI)	29

== Certifications ==
Certifications for "Chiamo io chiami tu"
Region	Certification	Certified units/sales
Italy (FIMI)	Platinum	200,000^{‡}
^{‡} Sales+streaming figures based on certification alone.
