= The Fire Within You =

2026 Italian drama film

- International teaser poster
- Italian: Il fuoco che ti porti dentro
- Directed by: Edoardo De Angelis
- Screenplay by: Edoardo De Angelis; Ilaria Macchia; Francesco Piccolo
- Based on: Il fuoco che ti porti dentro by Antonio Franchini
- Produced by: Roberto Sessa; Chiara Grassi
- Starring: Vanessa Scalera; Lino Musella; Elena Radonicich; Ivana Lotito; Tommaso Ragno; Nicole Malaj; Samuele Mazza; Tony Laudadio
- Cinematography: Vladan Radovic
- Edited by: Lorenzo Peluso
- Music by: La Niña
- Production companies: Picomedia; Rai Cinema
- Distributed by: 01 Distribution
- Release date: 9 September 2026 (Venice)
- Running time: 94 minutes
- Country: Italy
- Language: Italian

The Fire Within You (Italian: Il fuoco che ti porti dentro) is a 2026 Italian drama film directed by Edoardo De Angelis, co-written with Ilaria Macchia and Francesco Piccolo, based on the 2024 novel Il fuoco che ti porti dentro by Antonio Franchini. It stars Vanessa Scalera, Lino Musella, Elena Radonicich, Ivana Lotito, and Tommaso Ragno.

The film had its world premiere in the main competition of the 83rd Venice International Film Festival on 9 September 2026, where it competed for the Golden Lion.

== Synopsis ==
Antonio lives in Milan with a good job and a family, far away from his mother Angela, a dramatic, charming, old-fashioned, and difficult woman who comes to visit him for Christmas. Their Christmas Eve dinner turns into an emotional and funny but also harsh clash that brings back old misunderstandings. By the end of the night, mother and son face each other openly, in a moment that changes how they see their relationship, a love that burns like a fire within.

== Cast ==
- Vanessa Scalera as Angela
- Lino Musella as Antonio
- Elena Radonicich
- Ivana Lotito
- Tommaso Ragno
- Nicole Malaj
- Samuele Mazza
- Tony Laudadio

== Production ==
Filming took place in Naples from 23 February to 1 April 2026.

== Release ==
The Fire Within You premiered in the main competition of the 83rd Venice International Film Festival on 9 September 2026. It was also selected in the World Cinema section of the 31st Busan International Film Festival, where it will be screened in October.

Rai Cinema International Distribution acquired world rights to the film before its premiere.

== Reception ==
=== Critical response ===
Reviewing at Venice International Film Festival for Cineuropa, Camillo De Marco praised the film as a dense, humorous and moving family drama, highlighting Vanessa Scalera's performance as Angela. De Marco observed that Edoardo De Angelis condenses Antonio Franchina's autobiographical memoir into a single Christmas Eve, unfolding largely in one location and in real time, and compared its domestic tensions to a contemporary version of Eduardo De Filippo's 1931 film Natale in casa Cupiello. He praised De Angelis's direction, particularly the long takes, psychological tension and dialogue-driven structure, as well as Vladan Radovic's cinematography and La Niña's score. He concluded that the film's emotional resolution "isn't about forgiving or justifying, but simply about loving."

=== Accolades ===
Award	Date of ceremony	Category	Recipient(s)	Result	Ref.
Venice Film Festival	12 September 2026	Golden Lion	The Fire Within You	Nominated	
Venice Film Festival	12 September 2026	BookCiak Award	The Fire Within You	Won	
Venice Film Festival	12 September 2026	Award Francesco Pasinetti: Best Actress	Vanessa Scalera	Won	
Venice Film Festival	12 September 2026	Soundtrack Stars Award: Best Soundtrack	La Niña and Alfredo Maddaluno	Won	
