= Coco Chanel (Gaia song) =

Single by Gaia

from the album Genesi
- Language: Italian
- Released: 21 August 2020
- Length: 2:24
- Label: Sony
- Songwriters: Gaia Gozzi; Gerardo Pulli; Piero Romitelli; Simone Privitera
- Producers: Simon Says!; Gerardo Pulli; Piero Romitelli

Gaia singles chronology
"Chega" (2020)	"Coco Chanel" (2020)	"Nuove strade" (2020)

Music video
- "Coco Chanel" on YouTube

"Coco Chanel" is a song co-written and recorded by Italian singer Gaia. It was released on 21 August 2020 through Sony Music Italy, as the second single from her debut studio album Genesi.

The song peaked at number 36 on the Italian singles chart, being certified gold by FIMI.

== Music video ==
A music video of "Coco Chanel", directed by YouNuts!, was released on 21 August 2020 via Gaia's YouTube channel. It stars Italian actor Sergio Ruggeri.

== Charts ==
Weekly chart performance for "Coco Chanel"
Chart (2020)	Peak position
Italy (FIMI)	36
Italy Airplay (EarOne)	8

== Certifications ==
Certifications for "Coco Chanel"
Region	Certification	Certified units/sales
Italy (FIMI)	Gold	35,000^{‡}
^{‡} Sales+streaming figures based on certification alone.
