= New Dawns =

EP by Gaia
- Released: 16 December 2016
- Length: 19:34
- Label: Sony

Gaia chronology
New Dawns (2016)	Genesi (2020)

Singles from New Dawns
- 1. "New Dawns" Released: 9 December 2016

New Dawns is the debut extended play by Italian singer Gaia. It was released on 16 December 2016 by Sony Music Italy.

The EP includes the single with the same name and various cover songs performed during the tenth season of the Italian X Factor. It peaked at number 29 on the Italian Albums Chart.

== Track listing ==
New Dawns track listing
No.	Title	Writer(s)	Producer(s)	Length
1.	"New Dawns"	Chanty; Cesare Chiodo; Luca Chiaravalli	Fausto Cogliati; Luca Chiaravalli	3:03
2.	"Fast Car" (Tracy Chapman cover)	Tracy Chapman		4:01
3.	"Wild Things" (Alessia Cara cover)	Coleridge Tillman; James Ho; Alessia Caracciolo; Thabiso Nkhereanye		3:12
4.	"Human" (Rag'n'Bone Man cover)	Rory Graham; Jamie Hartman		3:17
5.	"Piece of My Heart" (Janis Joplin cover)	Bert Berns; Jerry Ragovoy		2:40
6.	"Vedrai, vedrai" (Luigi Tenco cover)	Luigi Tenco		3:20
Total length:				19:34

== Charts ==
Weekly chart performance for New Dawns
Chart (2017)	Peak position
Italy (FIMI)	29
