= New Dawns (song) =

Single by Gaia

from the EP New Dawns
- Language: English
- Released: 9 December 2016
- Length: 3:02
- Label: Sony
- Songwriter(s): Chantal Saroldi; Cesare Chiodo; Luca Chiaravalli
- Producer(s): Fausto Cogliati; Luca Chiaravalli

Gaia singles chronology
"New Dawns" (2016)	"Fotogramas" (2017)

Music video
- "New Dawns" on YouTube

"New Dawns" is the debut single by Italian singer Gaia. It was released on 9 December 2016 through Sony Music Italy, as the lead single from her debut EP with the same title.

The song, written by Chanty, Cesare Chiodo, and Luca Chiaravalli, served as the singer's original entry during the tenth season of X Factor. Gaia eventually finished as the runner-up.

The song peaked at number 7 on the Italian singles chart, being certified gold by FIMI.

== Charts ==
Weekly chart performance for "New Dawns"
Chart (2016)	Peak position
Italy (FIMI)	7

== Certifications ==
Certifications for "New Dawns"
Region	Certification	Certified units/sales
Italy (FIMI)	Gold	25,000^{‡}
^{‡} Sales+streaming figures based on certification alone.
