= Rosa dei venti =

Studio album by Gaia
- Released: 21 March 2025
- Genre: Pop; drum and bass; reggae pop; funk carioca; R&B
- Length: 37:17
- Label: Columbia
- Producer: Greg Willen; MadFingerz; Michelangelo; Miguel Duarte; Mr. Monkey; Oddsphere; KYV; Simon Says!; Thiago Faustino de Lima; Vigan; Zef

Gaia chronology
Alma (2021)	Rosa dei venti (2025)

Singles from Rosa dei venti
- 1. "Chiamo io chiami tu" Released: 12 February 2025; 2. "Nuda" Released: 29 August 2025

Rosa dei venti (transl. Compass rose) is the third studio album by Italian singer-songwriter Gaia, released on 21 March 2025 by Columbia.

The album included the single "Chiamo io chiami tu", with which the artist competed at the 75th Sanremo Music Festival, finishing in twenty-sixth place at the end of the event.

== Background and composition ==
The project serves as the artist's first album entirely in Italian. It was written, recorded and produced over the course of three years between Cefalù, Settimo Milanese and Lake Orta. The project was announced on 6 February 2025, a few days before the singer's participation in the 75th Sanremo Music Festival with the song "Chiamo io chiami tu". The official tracklist and the collaborations included in the album were revealed on 3 March, via a telephone number announced by the artist through her social media profiles.

The album consists of thirteen tracks, all written by the singer herself, with co-writing contribution by Davide Petrella, Emilio Barberini, Michele Zocca, Miguel Duarte, Matteo Novi, Alessandro La Cava, Vincenzo Centrella, Simon Says!, Francesco D'Agostino, Thiago Faustino de Lima, Vigan Mehmedi, Federico Bertollini and Zef. The record also includes featured collaborations with Italian rappers Guè, Capo Plaza and Lorenzza and Brazilian singer Toquinho.

Gaia talked about the process of creating the album and her choice to perform the songs entirely in Italian:

I think the most special process of this album was acceptance, which is played out on a daily basis and doesn't always work, but it's underway. And that alone makes me much happier and more grateful for what I do. [...] With Portuguese, I've always been very independent; I'd go into the studio and everything would come out easily, like a necessity, while Italian has always made me feel a little more distant. I wanted to remind myself that Italian is a beautiful musical treat, that the poetry of our language is unmatched.

== Cover ==
The singer explained the meaning of the cover image, which consists of a compass rose embossed on the artist's face:

It's our compass rose symbol. This prosthetic was made by Greta Giannone, and I wanted it to represent the third eye, the connection to creativity, to the empirical worlds, and I wanted the record to be tied to connection with others.

== Track listing ==
Rosa dei venti track listing
No.	Title	Lyrics	Music	Producer(s)	Length
1.	"Beijo (intro)"	Gaia Gozzi	Emilio Barberini; Vigan Mehmedi	MadFingerz; Vigan	1:34
2.	"Fumo blu"	Gozzi	Matteo Novi	Mr. Monkey	2:41
3.	"Addicted" (featuring Guè)	Gozzi; Cosimo Fini	Gregory Taurone; Novi	Greg Willen; Mr. Monkey	2:37
4.	"Chiamo io chiami tu"	Gozzi; Davide Petrella	Stefano Tognini	MadFingerz; Zef	3:37
5.	"Rosa dei venti"	Gozzi	Francesco Gastaldi; Giovanni Ergi	MadFingerz; Oddsphere; Vigan	2:50
6.	"Maratona"	Gozzi	Barberini; Mehmedi	MadFingerz; Vigan	2:53
7.	"Ti fidavi" (featuring Capo Plaza)	Gozzi; Luca D'Orso	Barberini; Mehmedi	MadFingerz; Vigan	2:11
8.	"Bulletproof"	Gozzi	Barberini; Mehmedi	MadFingerz; Vigan	2:25
9.	"Twin Flames"	Gozzi	Barberini; Maximilian Agostini; Mehmedi	MadFingerz; Vigan	3:33
10.	"Moon veleno"	Gozzi; Francesco D'Agostino	Vincenzo Centrella	KYV	3:00
11.	"RJ" (featuring Lorenzza)	Gozzi; Lorenzza Lacerda Campos	Barberini; Mehmedi	MadFingerz; Vigan	2:28
12.	"Cicatrice"	Gozzi	Simone Privitera	SimonSays!	3:37
13.	"Vento" (featuring Toquinho)	Gozzi; Alessandro La Cava; Antonio Filho; Federico Bertollini	Michele Zocca; Filho	MadFingerz; Michelangelo; Miguel Duarte; Thiago Faustino de Lima; Vigan	3:51

Rosa dei venti digital re-issue
No.	Title	Lyrics	Music	Producer(s)	Length
1.	"Nuda"	Gozzi; La Cava; Federica Abbate	Nicola Lazzarin	Cripo	2:37

== Charts ==
Chart performance for Rosa dei venti
Chart (2025)	Peak position
Italian Albums (FIMI)	6
