= Nuda (Gaia song) =

Single by Gaia

from the album Rosa dei venti (digital edition only)
- Released: 29 August 2025
- Genre: Dance-pop
- Length: 2:37
- Label: Columbia
- Songwriters: Gaia Gozzi; Alessandro La Cava; Federica Abbate; Nicola Lazzarin
- Producer: Cripo

Gaia singles chronology
"Chiamo io chiami tu" (2025)	"Nuda" (2025)

Music video
- "Nuda" on YouTube

"Nuda" is a song co-written and recorded by Italian singer Gaia. It was released as a single on 29 August 2025 by Columbia and included in the digital reissue of her third studio album, Rosa dei venti.

== Description ==
The song, written by the singer-songwriter herself with Alessandro La Cava and Federica Abbate, was produced by Nicola Lazzarin, aka Cripo, and recounts the artist's psychological distress (EMDR), through a late-summer journey into dreamlike and sensual atmospheres of nostalgia, introspection, sensuality, and solitude.

== Promotion ==
The release of the song was revealed on 22 August 2025 through an interview with the singer-songwriter in Vanity Fair Italia:

I liked that "Nuda" arrived just as we were leaving the summer atmosphere, with our tans starting to fade and that feeling of nostalgia, of saudade, in the air.

On 25 August 2025, the song was promoted in Milan through advertising screens and by the artist herself through her social media profiles.

== Music video ==
The music video, directed by Attilio Cusani, was released on the same day via Gaia's YouTube channel.

== Charts ==
Weekly chart performance for "Nuda"
Chart (2025)	Peak position
Italy (FIMI)	67
Italy Airplay (EarOne)	21
