= Alma (Gaia album) =

Studio album by Gaia
- Released: 29 October 2021
- Genre: Pop; Latin; R&B; world; bossa nova; funk carioca; reggae pop
- Length: 44:42
- Label: Columbia
- Producer: Andry the Hitmaker; Childsplay; Dema; Erin; Machweo; Orang3; Simon Says!

Gaia chronology
Genesi (2020)	Alma (2021)	Rosa dei venti (2025)

Singles from Alma
- 1. "Cuore amaro" Released: 4 March 2021; 2. "Boca" Released: 14 May 2021; 3. "Nuvole di zanzare" Released: 1 October 2021; 4. "What Christmas Means to Me" Released: 18 November 2021; 5. "Salina" Released: 7 January 2022

Alma is the second studio album by Italian singer-songwriter Gaia, released on 29 October 2021 by Columbia.

== Background and composition ==
The second album features fifteen songs, written in both Italian and Portuguese by the singer-songwriter together with numerous collaborators. The songs feature musical influences, including pop, reggaeton, Latin, bossa nova, addressing different themes related to spirituality, feminism, toxic relationships and the pain of overcoming childhood and adolescent trauma. The project features the participation of Francesca Michielin, Gemitaiz, Margherita Vicario, Tedua, Selton and Sean Paul. Interviewed by TV Sorrisi e Canzoni, Gaia stated about the album:

It's everything I am and everything I believe in, an introspective journey that gathers emotions and thoughts from the last year and a half. [...] The album is me, without genres, without labels, for better or for worse. It's an album designed to be played and sung live.

== Track listing ==
Alma – Standard track listing
No.	Title	Lyrics	Music	Producer(s)	Length
1.	"Alma"	Gaia Gozzi	Gozzi; Simone Privitera	SimonSays!	2:41
2.	"Bandiera"	Gozzi; Vincenzo Colella; Luca Galeandro	Gozzi; Privitera	SimonSays!	2:46
3.	"Fita do bonfim"	Gozzi	Rocco Giovannoni; Marco Spaggiari; Privitera	B-Croma; SimonSays!	2:51
4.	"Nuvole di zanzare"	Gozzi; Alessandro La Cava; Federico Bertollini; Dario Lombardi; Giovanni De Sanctis	Gozzi; La Cava; Bertollini; Lombardi; De Sanctis	Erin; SimonSays!	3:01
5.	"Ginga" (featuring Margherita Vicario and Francesca Michielin)	Gozzi; Margherita Vicario; Francesca Michielin	Gozzi; Andrea Moroni; Fabio De Marco	Andry the Hitmaker; Dema	3:15
6.	"Marina" (featuring Gemitaiz)	Gozzi; Davide De Luca	Privitera	SimonSays!	2:50
7.	"Occhi & jeans"	Gozzi; Daniele Dezi	Gozzi; Dezi	Orang3	3:05
8.	"Louca" (featuring J Lord)	Gozzi; Lord Johnson	Gozzi; Drama State; Privitera; Matteo Novi	Mr. Monkey; SimonSays!	2:43
9.	"Pomeriggio"	Gozzi; Jacopo Ettorre	Privitera	SimonSays!	2:42
10.	"Boca" (with Sean Paul)	Gozzi; Sean Paul Henriquez	Gozzi; Antonio Fernandez; Sonia Bazanta; Donald Hoitink; Mimoun Steven Kwik; Steve Keanu Tandaju	Childsplay	2:36
11.	"Cuore amaro"	Gozzi; Ettorre	Dezi; Giorgio Spedicato	Machweo; SimonSays!	2:33
12.	"Salina"	Gozzi; Colella; Viviana Colombo	Gozzi; Valerio Smordoni; Privitera	SimonSays!	3:24
13.	"Io e te (De leve)" (featuring Selton)	Gozzi; Daniel Goncalves Plentz; Ramiro Levy; Eduardo Stein Dechtiar	Gozzi; Plentz; Levy; Dechtiar; Privitera	SimonSays!	3:28
14.	"Paranauè" (featuring Tedua)	Gozzi; Mario Molinari	Privitera	SimonSays!	3:03
15.	"Sem tu"	Gozzi	Privitera	SimonSays!	3:44

Alma – Christmas Edition – Amazon Music exclusive bonus track
No.	Title	Writer(s)	Length
12.	"What Christmas Means to Me"	Allen Story; Anna Gordy Gaye; George Gordy	2:30

== Charts ==
Chart performance for Alma
Chart (2021)	Peak position
Italian Albums (FIMI)	18
