= Sissi (singer) =

Italian singer-songwriter (born 1999)

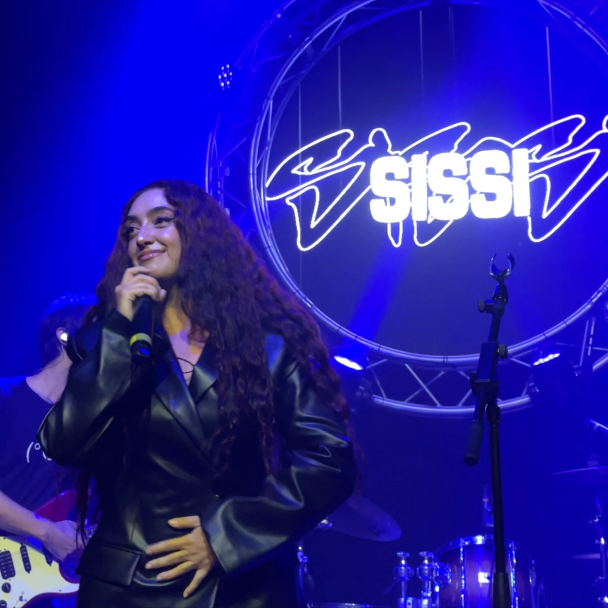
- Sissi in concert in Milan, 1 October 2025

Background information
- Born: Silvia Cesana; 21 February 1999 (age 27); Erba, Lombardy, Italy
- Genres: R&B
- Occupations: Singer; songwriter
- Instrument: Vocals
- Years active: 2017–present
- Labels: Sugar; Universal; Pluggers; Epic; Sony

Silvia Cesana (born 21 February 1999), known professionally as Sissi, is an Italian singer-songwriter.

== Early life and education ==
Born in 1999 in Erba and raised in Merone (both in the Province of Como), Sissi became interested in music at a young age, drawing particular inspiration from English singer Amy Winehouse.

As a teenager, she began writing songs in English, in 2017 which were released on Caterina Caselli's Sugar Music label. She obtained her high school diploma in languages at the "Carlo Porta" high school in Erba.

== Career ==
In 2019 she participated in the thirteenth season of X Factor, where she was eliminated by Sfera Ebbasta at the Home Visits. On 17 April 2020 she released her first official single "Sento", followed on 12 June by the single "Versus" featuring Tommy Dali. In the same year she accompanied Rkomi as a backing singer for the Dove gli occhi non arrivano tour. In November 2020, she participated in AmaSanremo with her unreleased song "Per farci paura", which was included on the soundtrack of the third season of the Netflix series Summertime.

In 2021, she participated in the twenty-first season of the talent show Amici di Maria De Filippi, reaching the final finishing in fifth place and winning the TIM critics' award worth 50,000 euros in gold tokens. On 27 May 2022 she released her first studio album, Leggera, which includes both new songs and the songs she presented at Amici, including "Come, come" (which went gold), "Stupidi lovers", "Danshari", "Dove sei" and "Scendi". Then, in September 2022, she performed "Sottovoce" at the TIM Music Awards at the Verona Arena. The following year, she wrote the lyrics for "Atacama", the third track on Giorgia's album Blu.

On 9 February 2024 she participated in the 74th Sanremo Music Festival on the fourth evening dedicated to covers, duetting with competing singer BigMama, along with Gaia and La Niña, singing the song "Fa strano (Lady Marmalade)", released the following 22 March. She subsequently joined the record label Pluggers, with which she released the single "Mezzo amore" on 5 April. That same year, she sang Princess Ellian's songs in the Netflix animated film Spellbound. On 11 April 2025 she released her first EP XS, containing six tracks, including the singles "Vorrei", "Telegram" and "Hooligans".

== Discography ==
=== Extended plays ===
List of EPs, with selected chart positions
Title	EP details	Peak chart positions
Title	EP details	ITA
Leggera	Released: 27 May 2022; Label: Sugar Music, Universal Music Italia; Format: CD, digital download, streaming	11
XS	Released: 11 April 2025; Label: Epic, Pluggers, Sony Music; Format: digital download, streaming	—

=== Soundtrack albums ===
Title	Details
Spellbound (Colonna Sonora Del Film Netflix di Skydance Animation)	Released: November 22, 2024; Label: Netflix Music; Format: Digital download, streaming

=== Singles ===
==== As lead artist ====
List of singles, with chart positions and album name
Title	Year	Certifications	Album or EP
"Sento"	2020		Non-album singles
"Versus" (featuring Tommy Dali)	2020		Non-album singles
"Per farti paura"	2020		Non-album singles
"Come, come"	2021	FIMI: Gold	Leggera
"Stupidi lovers"	2021		Leggera
"Danshari"	2022		Leggera
"Dove sei"	2022		Leggera
"Scendi"	2022		Leggera
"Sottovoce"	2022		Non-album singles
"Mezzo amore"	2024		Non-album singles
"Vorrei"	2025		XS
"Telegram"	2025		XS
"Hooligans"	2025		XS
"Colpo di stato"	2026		Non-album singles
"Amore mio"	2026		Non-album singles

==== As featured artist ====
List of singles and album name
Title	Year	Album
"Goccia" (Cyrus featuring Sissi)	2023	Gloria
"Fa strano (Lady Marmalade)" (BigMama featuring Gaia, Sissi and La Niña)	2024	Sangue

=== Collaborations ===
List of songs as featured artist
Title	Year	Album or EP
"Semplicemente" (JXN and Fares featuring Sissi and Emma Nolde)	2021	Extra #1
"Criminale" (Erin featuring Sissi)	2021	Luce spenta
"Affogo (outro)" (Ainé featuring Clementino and Sissi)	2021	Alchimia
"Sembrava impossibile" (DJ Shocca featuring Sottotono, Sissi and Gemitaiz)	2023	Sacrosanto
"Privacy" (Voga featuring CoCo and Sissi)	2025	Chi ama non dimentica

== Songwriting credits ==
List of selected songs co-written by Sissi
Title	Year	Artist(s)	Album or EP
"Like The Rain (Unpredictable)"	2018	Naomi	Non-album single
"Atacama"	2023	Giorgia	Blu

== Tournée ==
=== As a solo artist ===
- 2022 – Live 2022
- 2026 – Amore Mio Tour

For other artists

- 2019/2020 – Dove gli occhi non arrivano Tour Rkomi's tour as a chorister

== Television programs ==
Year	Title	Network	Notes
2019	X Factor	Sky Uno	Contestant (season 13)
2020	AmaSanremo	Rai 1	Contestant (season 14)
2021–2022	Amici di Maria De Filippi	Canale 5	Contestant, fifth place (season 21)
2024	Sanremo Music Festival 2024	Rai 1	Guest on the cover night

== Dubbing ==
Year	Title	Role	Notes
2024	Spellbound	Ellian	Italian voice

== Awards and nominations ==
Year	Award	Nomination	Result	Notes
2022	Amici di Maria De Filippi	TIM Critics' Award	Won	
