= Roberto Angelini =

Italian singer-songwriter, guitarist and record producer

- Born: October 17, 1975 (age 50); Rome, Italy
- Occupations: Singer-songwriter, guitarist, record producer
- Instruments: Vocals, guitar, piano
- Years active: 1990s–present
- Labels: Virgin, Carosello Records, FioriRari

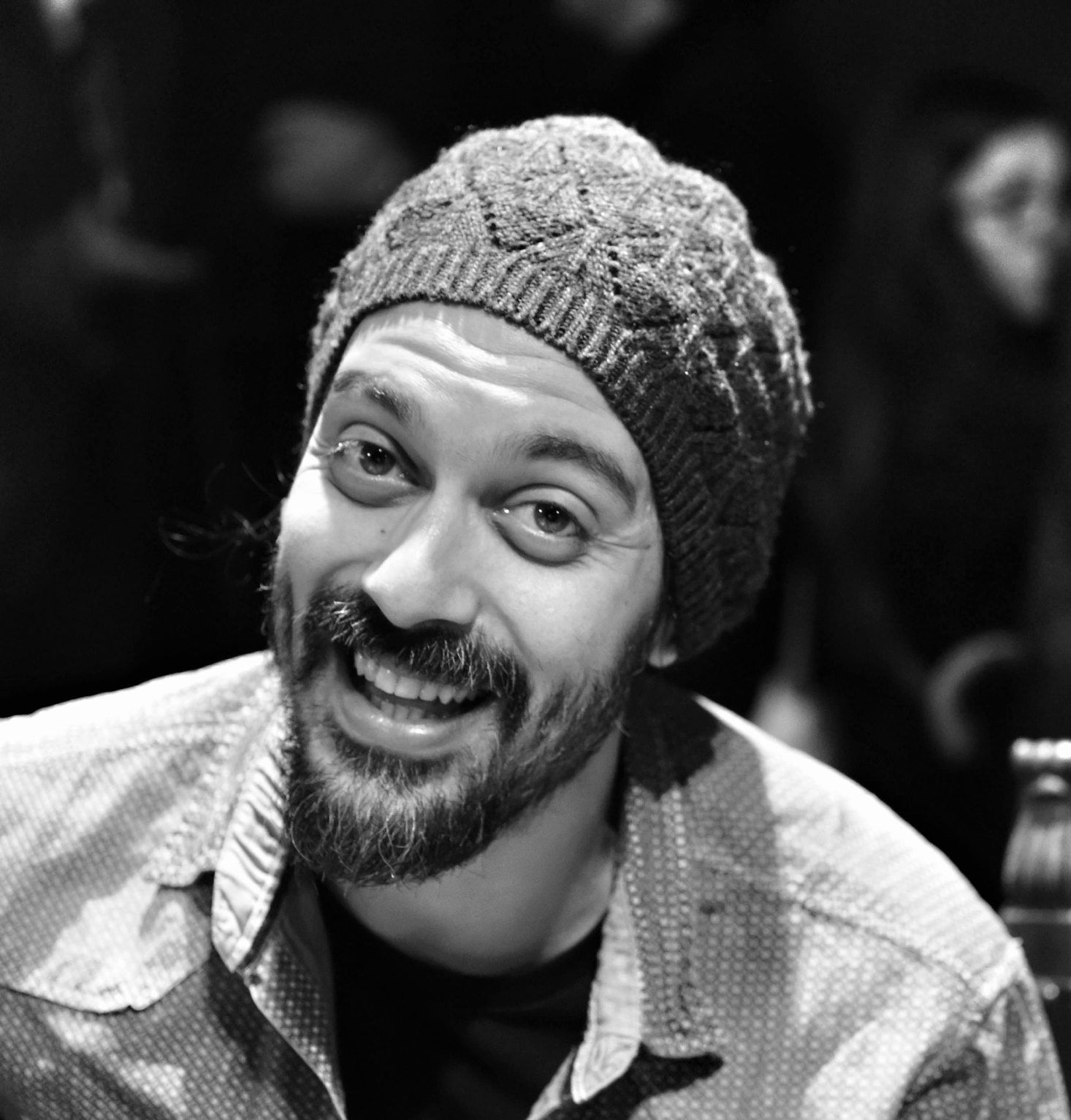
Angelini in 2014

Roberto Angelini (born 17 October 1975) is an Italian singer-songwriter, guitarist and record producer. He came to wider public attention after winning the Mia Martini Critics' Prize in the newcomers section of the Sanremo Music Festival 2001 with the song "Il sig. Domani".

He later became known to a broader audience with the singles "Gattomatto" and "La gioia del risveglio" in the early 2000s.

In addition to his solo work, Angelini has worked as a collaborator, songwriter, producer and touring musician. He has co-produced Niccolò Fabi's album Tradizione e tradimento, produced Margherita Vicario's debut album, and written songs recorded by artists including Emma Marrone and Elodie.

== Early life ==
Angelini grew up in Rome in a musical environment. He was influenced by his stepfather, Vittorio Camardese, a guitarist associated with early tapping techniques, and began playing in bands as a teenager. After studying piano, he turned mainly to acoustic guitar and began writing songs.

Before his recording debut, he opened concerts for artists including Jarabe de Palo, Max Gazzè, Marina Rei and Carmen Consoli.

== Career ==
=== Debut and Sanremo ===
Angelini signed with Virgin in 1999. His debut album, Il sig. Domani, was released in 2001 and produced by Daniele Sinigallia. The title track was performed in the newcomers section of the Sanremo Music Festival 2001, where Angelini won the Mia Martini Critics' Prize.

=== Angelini and wider recognition ===
In 2003 Angelini returned with the single "Gattomatto", which preceded his second album, Angelini. Rockol wrote that the success of the single outpaced that of the album itself. Sources also connect the period with the singles "La gioia del risveglio" and "12 anni".

=== Later solo work ===
After the Angelini album, he returned to a more acoustic singer-songwriter approach. In 2005 he collaborated with Rodrigo D'Erasmo on PongMoon – Sognando Nick Drake, a tribute project devoted to Nick Drake.

His album La vista concessa was released in 2009 by Carosello Records. In 2012 he released the EP L'era dell'apparenza and the album Phineas Gage. In 2021 he released Il cancello nel bosco, his first album of new original solo material in nine years.

=== Collaborations, songwriting and television ===
Angelini has long worked with artists from the Roman singer-songwriter scene, including Niccolò Fabi, Daniele Silvestri and Max Gazzè. In 2014 he played guitar in the touring band for Fabi Silvestri Gazzè.

As a songwriter, he wrote "Calore" for Emma Marrone, and later wrote songs for Emma and Elodie. He also co-produced Niccolò Fabi's Tradizione e tradimento and produced Margherita Vicario's debut album.

By 2021 he had been involved in television music work for nearly a decade, first on Rai 3's Gazebo and later on LA7's Propaganda Live.

== Personal life ==
Angelini was in a relationship with actress Claudia Pandolfi during the 2000s. Their son, Gabriele, was born in 2006.

== Discography ==
=== Solo studio albums ===
- Il sig. Domani (2001)
- Angelini (2003)
- La vista concessa (2009)
- Phineas Gage (2012)
- Il cancello nel bosco (2021)

=== Collaborative albums ===
- PongMoon – Sognando Nick Drake (with Rodrigo D'Erasmo) (2005)
- Discoverland (with Pier Cortese) (2012)

=== EPs ===
- Roberto Angelini (2000)
- Ripropongo (2004)
- L'era dell'apparenza (2012)
