= Cuore amaro =

Single by Gaia

from the album Alma
- Released: 4 March 2021
- Genre: Latin pop; R&B
- Length: 2:33
- Label: Sony Music
- Songwriters: Gaia Gozzi; Jacopo Ettorre; Daniele Dezi; Giorgio Spedicato
- Producers: Machweo; Simon Says!

Gaia singles chronology
"Nuove strade" (2020)	"Cuore amaro" (2021)	"Boca" (2021)

"Cuore amaro" ("Bitter Heart") is a song co-written and recorded by Italian singer Gaia. It was released on 4 March 2021 through Sony Music Italy, as the lead single from her second studio album Alma.

The song served as Gaia's entry for the Sanremo Music Festival 2021, the 71st edition of Italy's musical festival which doubles also as a selection of the act for Eurovision Song Contest, where it placed 19th in the grand final. "Cuore amaro" peaked at number 17 on the Italian FIMI Singles Chart and was certified gold in Italy.

== Background and composition ==
"Cuore amaro" was written by Gaia, Jacopo Ettorre, Machweo and Orang3 and produced by Machweo and Simon Says.

The song deals with the singer's love for herself, as described by the artist herself: "For the first time I'm not singing about love, but a song about myself, about my story. The "bitter heart" is mine, it tells a little about my stubbornness in not giving up, in a sincere way. It is also a song that in terms of arrangement, mood and production tells my story and takes you a little bit to South America but in a fresh way, in today's way... in my way of making music".

== Critics reception ==
The song received generally positive reviews by Italian music critics. Carmen Guadalaxara of Il Tempo greeted the artist's song positively, associating it with words such as “exuberant, elegant and effervescent." Rolling Stone Italia appreciated the singer's contemporaneity, stating, “she is a child of her time, traveling smoothly between musical styles and geographies,” a sentiment confirmed by Silvia Danielli of Billboard Italia, who described the singer's project as “particularly pleasant and enveloping.”

== Music video ==
The music video for the song was released on YouTube on 4 March 2021, to accompany the single's release. It was directed by Enea Colombi.

== Live performances ==
On 1 May 2021 Gaia performed the song during the annual Concerto del Primo Maggio.

== Charts ==
Chart performance for "Cuore amaro"
Chart (2021)	Peak position
Italy (FIMI)	17
Italy Airplay (EarOne)	9

== Certifications ==
Region	Certification	Certified units/sales
Italy (FIMI)	Gold	35,000^{‡}
^{‡} Sales+streaming figures based on certification alone.
