= Gaia (singer) =

Italian singer-songwriter (born 1997)

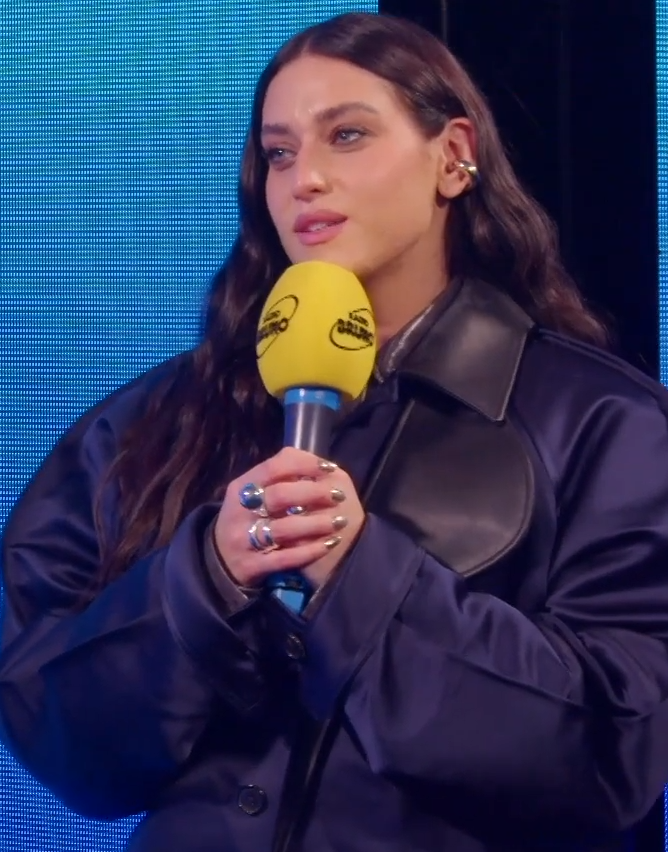
- Gozzi in 2025

Background information
- Born: Gaia Gozzi; 29 September 1997 (age 29); Guastalla, Emilia-Romagna, Italy
- Genres: Pop; Latin pop; R&B
- Occupations: Singer; songwriter
- Instruments: Vocals; guitar; piano
- Works: Discography
- Years active: 2016–present
- Labels: Columbia; RCA; Sony Music

Logo

Gaia Gozzi (born 29 September 1997), known professionally by the mononym Gaia, is an Italian singer-songwriter.

She became famous for winning the nineteenth edition of the talent show Amici di Maria De Filippi in 2020, and for being the runner-up at the tenth edition of the Italian version of X Factor in 2016.

== Life and career ==
Gaia was born in Guastalla (Reggio Emilia), from a Brazilian mother and an Italian father; she currently lives in Viadana (Mantua). In her songs she mixes Italian and Brazilian Portuguese.

In 2016 she participated as a contestant in the tenth edition of the TV format X Factor, becoming part of Fedez's team, finishing in second place. She released her EP New Dawns, containing the title track, certified gold by FIMI for selling over 25,000 copies. During 2017 she opened the concerts of Giorgia's Oronero Tour and released the single "Fotogramas".

In 2019 she was cast in the nineteenth edition of the talent show Amici di Maria De Filippi. The singer wrote and composed several songs during the program, included in the album Genesi, released on 20 March 2020, by Sony Music. The album debuted at number 15 in the FIMI chart, peaking the fifth position following the talent show singer's victory. On April 22, she announced the reissue of the album in physical format, entitled Nuova Genesi. The promotional singles were "Chega", which peaked at number 11 in the Italian Singles charts, and "Coco Chanel".

She competed at the Sanremo Music Festival 2021 with the song "Cuore amaro", which was placed 19th in the grand final and was lately certified gold in Italy. On 14 May 2021 was published the collaboration in Portuguese "Boca" with Sean Paul, later certified golden disc by FIMI. On 1 October 2021 released "Nuvole di zanzare", a single that anticipates the second studio album Alma, out on 29 October. The album, which featured Francesca Michielin, Gemitaiz, Kid Yugi, Artie 5ive, Sal Da Vinci, Tedua, peaked at number 18 on Italian Albums Chart. In November 2021, Gaia was among the artists featured at Corona Capital Festival in Mexico City, performing alongside Tame Impala, Disclosure and The Kooks.

In 2021 Gaia collaborated with emerging singer Madame on "Luna" and with Italian rapper Rkomi on "Mare che non sei", respectively peaking at 35 and 30 on the Italian Singles Chart, earning the golden certification by FIMI. In 2022, she released "Salina", her third single from Alma, and collaborated with Carl Brave on Sick Luke's song "Mosaici". She also collaborated with Ernia and Guè on "Bastava la metà".

In 2023 Gaia published two solo singles "Estasi" and "Tokyo", which peaked at number one on Italian Airplay Chart. In the summer of 2024 she collaborated with Tony Effe on "Sesso e samba", which peaked at number one on the Italian Singles Chart. In December 2024, Gaia was announced as one of the participants in the Sanremo Music Festival 2025. She placed 26th with the song "Chiamo io chiami tu". Her album Rosa dei venti was published on 21 March 2025.

== Discography ==
- Genesi (2020)
- Alma (2021)
- Rosa dei venti (2025)

== Television ==
Year	Title	Role	Notes
2016	X Factor	Contestant	Talent show (season 10) – Runner up
2017	Summer Festival	Performer	Music festival, performing "Fotogramas"
2019–2020	Amici di Maria De Filippi	Contestant	Talent show (season 19) – Winner
2021	Sanremo Music Festival 2021	Contestant	Annual music festival, competing with "Cuore amaro"
2022	Un'ora sola vi vorrei	Guest	Variety show
2022	Sanremo Music Festival 2022	Guest performer	Annual music festival
2024	Sanremo Music Festival 2024	Guest performer	Performing "Lady Marmalade" with BigMama, Sissi and La Niña in the duets night
2024	Amici verso il serale	Co-host	Pre-final stage special of Amici di Maria De Filippi season 23
2025	Sanremo Music Festival 2025	Contestant	Annual music festival; competing with "Chiamo io chiami tu"
2026	Sanremo Music Festival 2026	Guest performer	Performing "Chiamo io chiami tu" on the Suzuki Stage (night one); duetting with Levante in "I maschi" (cover night)

== Filmography ==
Year	Title	Role	Notes
2023	Wish	Asha	Italian voice

== Awards and nominations ==
Award	Year	Category	Nominated work	Result
Amici di Maria De Filippi	2020	Singing Category Award	Herself	Won
Amici di Maria De Filippi	2020	TIM Award	"Coco Chanel"	Won
Billboard Italia Women in Music	2024	Hitmaker of the Year	Herself	Won
FIMI Award	2024	Charts Achievement	"Sesso e samba" (with Tony Effe)	Won
Forbes Italia	2021	Impact Award (Under-30 Artist with Most Impact in Music)	Herself	Won
TIM Music Awards	2024	Multiplatinum Single	"Sesso e samba" (with Tony Effe)	Won
Videoclip Italia Awards	2025	Best Styling	"Dea saffica"	Nominated
