= Genesi (album) =

2020 studio album by Gaia

Studio album by Gaia
- Released: 20 March 2020
- Recorded: 2019–2020
- Genre: Pop
- Length: 29:31
- Language: Italian, Portuguese
- Label: RCA
- Producer: Simon Says!; Machweo; Gianmarco Manilardi; Antonio Filippelli; Piero Romitelli; Gerardo Pulli; Alex Uhimann

Gaia chronology
New Dawns (2016)	Genesi (2020)	Alma (2021)

Singles from Genesi
- 1. "Chega" Released: 16 March 2020; 2. "Coco Chanel" Released: 21 August 2020

Genesi is the debut studio album by Italian singer-songwriter Gaia, released by RCA on 20 March 2020. On 22 May 2020 the project was reissued in a double album, titled Nuova Genesi.

The album, which featured ten songs in Italian and Portuguese, peaked at number three on the Italian Albums Chart and was certified gold by FIMI. The album was promoted by the singles "Chega" and "Coco Chanel".

== Background and composition ==
After the publication of her debut EP New Dawns through Sony Music Italy, in 2019 Gaia was cast in the nineteenth edition of the talent show Amici di Maria De Filippi, becoming the winner of the edition in May 2020. During the TV program she wrote and produced several songs, including "Chega", "Coco Chanel" and "Fucsia".

In an interview with Vanity Fair Italia the singer shared about her desire to keep both the Italian and Brazilian languages in the songs' lyrics in order to maintain her cultural identity in the album. In an interview with Rockol Gaia also explained the meaning of Genesi and the music and sound productions:

"[This album] is my rebirth, the result of many hours of study and work. I turned my different identities into music. This is because I wanted a few things that I could defend and that reflected me. Inside there is electronic music, there is bossanova, there are the influences that come from my Brazilian origins and also a treatment of the Italian language. I was not at all sure I wanted to sing in Italian, I always experienced it as a kind of “you have to do it because we are in Italy.” Then slowly, even with the help of great authors like Antonio Di Martino, I realized that it was actually what I really wanted. And I freed myself."

== Critic reception ==
Mattia Marzi of Rockol compared the album to Francesca Michielin's album di20 and, praising the "minimal electronics, South American music echoes and acoustic guitars that squeeze between synths and keyboards", calling it "an interesting proposition and not at all trivia".

== Track listing ==
Genesi – Standard track listing
No.	Title	Writer(s)	Producer(s)	Length
1.	"Chega"	Gaia Gozzi; Simone Privitera	Simon Says!	3:04
2.	"Densa"	Gozzi; Privitera; Jacopo Ettore	Simon Says!	3:20
3.	"What I Say"	Gozzi; Privitera	Simon Says!	2:46
4.	"Mi ricordo un po' di me"	Gozzi; Privetta; Davide Napoleone; Giorgio Spedicato; Martina Beltrami; Simone Sproccati	Machweo; Simon Says!	3:06
5.	"Coco Chanel"	Gozzi; Privetta; Gerardo Pulli; Piero Romitelli	Gerardo Pulli; Piero Romitelli; Simon Says!	2:24
6.	"Fucsia"	Gozzi; Andrea Bonomo; Gianluigi Fazio; Niccolò Bolchi	Alex Uhlmann; ETNA	3:01
7.	"Stanza 309"	Gozzi; Antonio Dimartino; Gianmarco Manilardi; Valerio Smordoni	Antonio Filippelli; Gianmarco Manilardi	3:05

Nuova Genesi – Deluxe edition bonus tracks
No.	Title	Writer(s)	Producer(s)	Length
8.	"Il rosso delle rose"	Gozzi; Privitera; Giorgio Spedicato; Ettore	Machweo; Simon Says!	3:05
9.	"Bela Flor"	Gozzi; Privitera	Gozzi; Simon Says!	2:36
10.	"Calma"	Gozzi; Privitera	Simon Says!	3:04
Total length:				29:31

== Commercial performance ==
The album debuted at number five on the Italian Albums Chart. With the reissue of the album in May 2020, Nuova Genesi peaked at number three on the chart, being certificed god by FIMI in November 2020.

== Charts ==
=== Weekly charts ===
Chart performance for Nuova Genesi
Chart (2020)	Peak position
Italian Albums (FIMI)	3
Swiss Albums (Schweizer Hitparade)	68

=== Year-end charts ===
Year-end chart performance for "Nuova Genesi"
Chart (2020)	Position
Italy (FIMI)	49

== Certifications ==
Certifications for Nuova Genesi
Region	Certification	Certified units/sales
Italy (FIMI)	Gold	25,000^{‡}
^{‡} Sales+streaming figures based on certification alone.
