= Chega (song) =

Single by Gaia

from the album Genesi
- Language: Portuguese
- Released: 16 March 2020
- Genre: Electropop; bossa nova
- Length: 3:05
- Label: Sony
- Songwriters: Gaia Gozzi; Simone Privitera
- Producer: Simon Says!

Gaia singles chronology
"Fotogramas" (2017)	"Chega" (2020)	"Coco Chanel" (2020)

Music video
- "Chega" on YouTube

"Chega" is a song written and recorded by Italian singer Gaia. It was released on 16 March 2020 through Sony Music Italy, as the lead single from her debut studio album Genesi.

The song peaked at number eleven on the Italian singles chart, being certified double platinum by FIMI.

== Composition and release ==
The song was written by the singer herself and Italian record producer Simon Says!. In an interview with TV Sorrisi e Canzoni, she explained the meaning of the song:

"[The album Genesi and the song "Chega"] are both the result of a phrase that has accompanied me over the years, which is, "I am my own revolution". In that album are my Brazilian roots, my family and everything about me. “Chega” in Portuguese has two meanings. It means "enough" but it also means "to arrive". They sound contrary but they are two consecutive actions. First the rejection of something that makes you feel bad and then the action of going down the street in search of a new life".

The song was also published in Italian language with the reissue of the album Nuova Genesi. On August 7, 2020, the official remix of the song was published featuring Strage.

== Music video ==
The music video for the song, directed by Younuts, was released on March 16, 2020, through the singer's YouTube channel.

== Charts ==
=== Weekly charts ===
Chart performance for "Chega"
Chart (2020)	Peak position
Italian Single (FIMI)	11
Italy Airplay (Earone)	2

=== Year-end charts ===
Year-end chart performance for "Chega"
Chart (2020)	Position
Italy (FIMI)	36

== Certifications ==
Certifications for Chega
Region	Certification	Certified units/sales
Italy (FIMI)	2× Platinum	140,000^{‡}
^{‡} Sales+streaming figures based on certification alone.
