= List of Italian hip-hop musicians =

This is a list of hip hop musicians from Italy.

== List of artists ==
- 99 Posse
- Achille Lauro
- Amir Issaa
- Articolo 31
- Bassi Maestro
- Blind
- Bresh
- Caparezza
- Carl Brave
- Clementino
- Club Dogo formerly Sacre Scuole
- Coez
- Dargen D'Amico
- Duke Montana
- Egreen
- El Presidente
- Emis Killa
- En?gma
- Ensi
- Ernia
- Esa
- Fabri Fibra
- Fedez
- Fred De Palma
- La Famiglia
- Fasma
- La Fossa
- Frankie Hi-NRG MC
- Gemelli DiVersi
- Gemitaiz
- Ghali
- Grido (rapper)
- Gué Pequeno
- DJ Gruff
- Herman Medrano
- Ice One
- Inoki
- Ion (rapper)
- J-Ax
- Joe Cassano
- Junior Cally
- Kaos One
- Koito
- La Fossa
- Livio Cori
- Madame
- Madh
- Madman
- Marracash
- Mudimbi
- Moreno
- Nayt
- Neffa
- Nerone
- Nesli
- Nitro
- Noyz Narcos
- Otierre
- Piotta
- Primo Brown
- Rancore
- Random
- Rocco Hunt
- Sangue Misto
- Salmo
- Sfera Ebbasta
- Shade
- Shiva (rapper)
- DJ Skribble
- Tedua
- Tha Supreme
- Thema
- Tormento
- Vacca
- Willie Peyote

== See also ==
- Italian hip hop
