= Italian hip-hop =

Music genre

Italian hip-hop is hip-hop rapped in the Italian language and/or made by Italian artists. One of the first hip-hop crews to catch the attention of the Italian mainstream was Bologna's Isola Posse All Star, then and still today produced by Sandro Orru, also known as DJ Gruff.

== History ==
=== 1980s ===
In the early 1980s, hip-hop spread to Italy through posse cuts, which were popular in social centers, alternative centers where several left-wing young people regularly meet, and where the extremely influential Italian hardcore punk scene was flourishing, from which the Italian posse cut movement inherited its social conscious. The first star to emerge from this scene was Jovanotti, who would rap in otherwise standard Italian pop. While Jovanotti was discovered by the famous producer Claudio Cecchetto and quickly reached fame, in the underground Radical Stuff published the first Italian hip-hop street video Let's Get Dizzy, featuring lo Greco Bros in 1989. Also that year, Marko Von Schoenberg of Stone Castle Records in Italy produced Dre' n OG along with Andre Herring (now known as the King of Art) and Nathaniel Goodwin, with songs such as AK-47, Got Damn, Do Beat, and Spread Your Legs. But DRE and OG never received any payments for recordings.

Underground hip-hop group Assalti Frontali, was founded in Rome in 1988. They are known for their left-wing politically and socially charged lyrics.

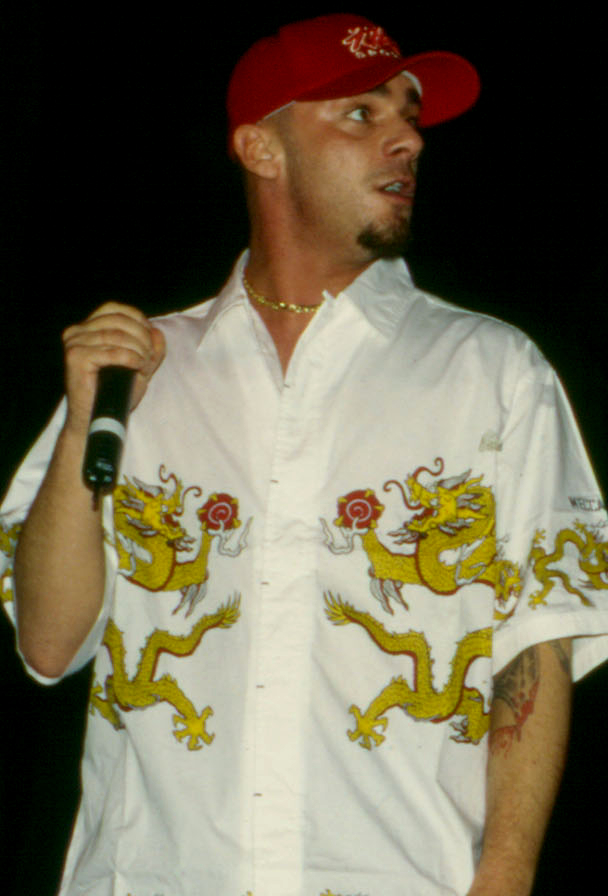
J-Ax, ex member of the Articolo 31 performing at a concert

=== 1990s ===
In the 1990s, Piazzale Flaminio, in Rome, was the centre for Italian hip-hop and rap music.

In 1991, the posse cut movement produced its first underground rap in the Italian language, with tracks such as "Stop al panico" by Isola Posse All Star, a track against murders and violence in the streets.

Articolo 31, formed by J-Ax and DJ Jad: they started out as a mainly East Coast hip-hop-inspired hip-hop duo, rapped in two commercials (for big companies such as Fiat and Big Bubble) in 1993. The duo had always been criticized for their connection to the Italian pop music market. In 1996, as they started their performance at Venice's hip-hop festival, the others rappers left the stage as a symbolic protest against them.

Later that decade, a dissing battle started between them and the Zero Stress Crew (formed by Sangue Misto and Radical Stuff). Other important crews and rappers included Bologna's Porzione Massiccia Crew, Sangue Misto (project born from Isola Posse All Star), with their 1994 album SXM, which has influenced all subsequent Italian hip-hop tracks.

At the end of 1999, the Milanese group Sacre Scuole, made up of Jake La Furia, Gué Pequeno and Dargen D'Amico, released the album 3 MC's al cubo.

The group Gemelli DiVersi was founded in 1997, it is a group which blends hip-hop with vocal harmonies, and often with socially conscious lyrics. Their first single was the Pooh sampling "Un attimo ancora" (1998). The group had a peak of success in the 2000s, with songs such as "Un altro ballo" (2004), "Vivi per un miracolo" (2007) and their biggest hit, "Mary" (2003).

=== 2000s ===
At the beginning of the new millennium, the Apulian rapper Caparezza achieves success with the album Verità supposte. In 2001, the group Sottotono took part in the Sanremo Music Festival and then broke up shortly after. After the dissolution of the Articolo 31 and the abandonment of Neffa from the rap scene, there is a period of fatigue for the Italian scene that awakens with some productions: first of all we must remember Mi fist by Club Dogo, Fabiano detto Inoki by Inoki, Mondo Marcio by Mondo Marcio, and above all Mr. Simpatia by Fabri Fibra.

Although the Italian hip-hop scene remains firm in the underground, the record market, and headed by independent labels such as Portafoglio Lainz or Vibra Records. In 2006, several MCs manage to get a record deal with major labels: Mondo Marcio, a Milanese rapper, signs for EMI, Inoki with Warner, Fabri Fibra and Club Dogo with Universal, while Cor Veleno sign for H2O Music, being the first Italian artists to exploit digital music. Some video clips, such as that of "Applausi per Fibra" by Fabri Fibra, manage to reach broadcasters such as AllMusic or MTV and gain decent positions in the charts. Between 2006 and 2008, the genre expands to a wider audience, initially thanks to the album Solo un uomo by Mondo Marcio, which brought the genre to the general public in Italy, then followed by the albums Tradimento by Fabri Fibra and Marracash by Marracash, who managed to conquer the top positions in the standings.

Meanwhile in Rome, among all the Hip-hop culture groups, the Truceklan was establishing itself, created by the union of the hip-hop groups Truceboys and In the Panchine. Among the main members of the group stood out: Noyz Narcos, Metal Carter, Gel, Cole, Gemello, Chicoria, Benassa, Duke Montana (who left the group in 2011) and Zinghero. While on the production side: Lou Chano, DJ Sano Volcano, 3FX, Fuzzy, DJ Gengis, Rough, Giordy Beatz, Meme, DJ Sine, Marco Tozzi and Low Killa. The main album released by the collective is Ministero dell'Inferno. The genres touched by the group range from Gangsta rap to Hardcore hip-hop to Rap metal.

=== 2010s ===
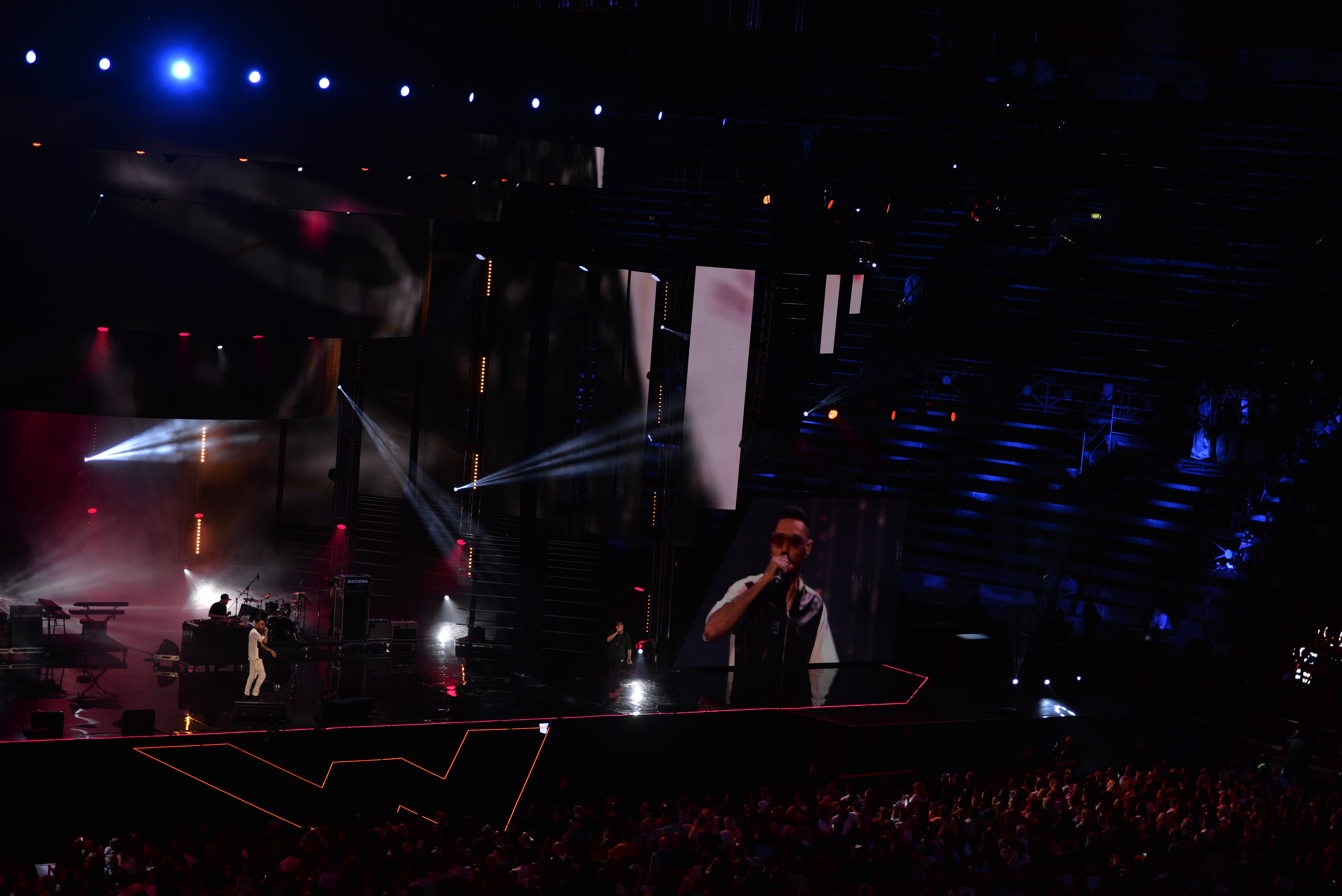
Marracash and Gué Pequeno at the 2016 Wind Music Awards

Since 2010, after the success of the single "Tranne te" by Fabri Fibra, artists such as Emis Killa, Clementino, Fedez, Gemitaiz, MadMan, Rocco Hunt, Baby K, and Salmo make their debut in Italian hip-hop.

At the same time artists are born who manage to bring their music to high levels of sale, examples of these artists are Noyz Narcos and Nitro. Around 2015, the trap influence arrives in Italy starting from albums like Santeria by Gué Pequeno and Marracash, XDVR and Sfera Ebbasta by Sfera Ebbasta, 23 6451 by tha Supreme and The Dark Album by the Dark Polo Gang.

It is followed by new artists such as Achille Lauro, Capo Plaza, Izi, Ghali, Ketama126, Massimo Pericolo, Ernia, tha Supreme and many others. Although, the underground remains firm with artists such as Jack the Smoker, Lord Madness, Murubutu, Claver Gold, Primo Brown (died in 2016), DJ Fastcut, Suarez, Leslie, Hard Squat Crew, Inoki, Rancore, Mezzosangue, Lanz Khan, Mattak (Italian-speaking but Swiss), Gionni Gioielli, L'Elfo, En?gma and many others.

During the decade, albums that have already become classics of the genre such as Il ragazzo d'oro by Guè Pequeno, Mea culpa by Clementino, The Island Chainsaw massacre by Salmo, Il cuore e la fame by Egreen and Dead Poets by DJ FastCut are released.

=== 2020s ===
Among the artists of the alternative hip-hop genre that include En?gma, with the series of albums Totem, started with Totem – Episodio uno, anticipated by the single "Bomaye". Other important artists are Madame and Willie Peyote, both present at the 71st edition of the Sanremo Music Festival respectively with the songs "Voce", produced by Dardust and "Mai dire mai (La locura)". At the start of 2021, Il Tre released his first album, Ali, that debuted on the first place in the FIMI chart just 1 week after its release. Other modern Italian rappers, such as Wado, focus more on issues of immigration and racism in their lyrics, which still affect many Afro-Italian rappers today.

== Other forms of the hip-hop ==
=== Freestyle ===
The first to have practiced freestyle in Italy were Neffa, Danno from Colle der Fomento, El Presidente and Moddi MC from the crew Pooglia Tribe. Clementino is a multiple-time Italian freestyle champion.

=== DJing, writing and breakdancing ===
From the overseas situation, writing, beatboxing and breakdancing have been "imported", as well as DJing. DJs include DJ Jad, Don Joe, Shablo, DJ Tayone, DJ Squarta (Cor Veleno), DJ Double S, Deleterio, DJ Nais, DJ Gruff, DJ Shocca, Mr. Phil, DJ 2P, Bassi Maestro, Big Joe and DJ Harsh.

== Bibliography ==
- Stokes, Martin (2003). "Ethnicity and Race". In John Shepherd; David Horn; Dave Laing; Paul Oliver; Peter Wicke (eds.). Continuum Encyclopedia of Popular Music of the World, Volume 1: Media, Industry and Society. London: Continuum. ISBN 0-8264-6321-5.
