= Inoki (rapper) =

Italian rapper (born 1979)

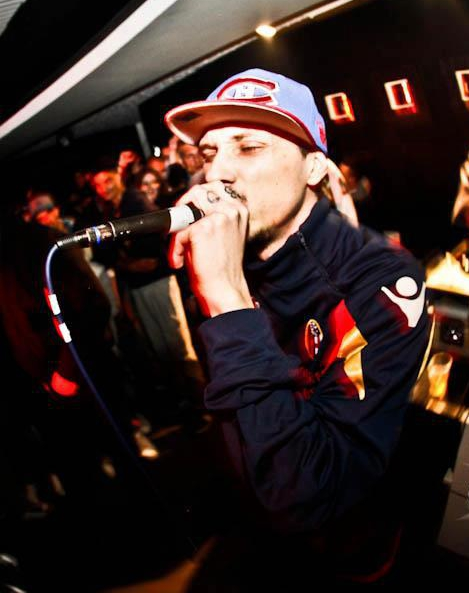
Inoki at a Jam Session (April 2012)

Inoki, also known as Inoki Ness, pseudonym of Fabiano Ballarin (Rome, October 2, 1979), is an Italian rapper and record producer.

It owes its nickname to its old Enok tag, which he later associates with the Old Testament character Enoch. "Ness", on the other hand, is a Bolognese slang expression to indicate who "knows". Furthermore, as he himself stated, the stage name also derives from Antonio Inoki, a well-known Japanese wrestler.

== Discography ==
=== Solo ===
==== Studio albums ====
- 2001 – 5º Dan
- 2005 – Fabiano detto Inoki
- 2007 – Nobiltà di strada
- 2014 – L'antidoto
- 2021 – Medioego and Nuovo Medioego
- 2022 – 4 Mani (with DJ Shocca)

==== Mixtapes ====
- 2006 – The Newkingztape Vol. 1
- 2008 – Street Kingz Vol. 1
- 2008 – Street Kingz Vol. 2
- 2010 – Pugni in faccia (with Mad Dopa)
- 2011 – Flusso di coscienza
- 2016 – Basso profilo - The Mixtape

==== Ep ====
- 2021 – Continuo Ep

==== Singles ====
- 2005 – Bologna by Night 2004
- 2007 – Sentimento reciproco
- 2007 – Il mio paese se ne frega
- 2012 – L'antidoto
- 2020 – Trema
- 2020 – Nomade
- 2018 – Aqui No Pasa Nada (with Favelas J Flus & King Dest)
- 2021 – Ispirazione (with Noemi)
- 2021 - 100 S (with Bresh & Disme)
- 2023 - CAZZOMINOMINI

=== With Porzione Massiccia Crew ===
- 1998 – Demolizione 1
- 2002 – Demolizione 2
- 2004 – PMC VS Club Dogo - The Official Mixtape (with Dogo Gang)

=== Collaborations ===
- 1998 – DJ Lugi ft. Inoki, Joe Cassano – 50 MCs (from 50 MCs Pt. II)
- 1999 – Fritz da Cat ft. Inoki & Joe Cassano – Giorno e notte (from Novecinquanta)
- 1999 – Joe Cassano ft. Inoki, Lord Bean, Fritz da Cat – Gli occhi della strada (from Dio lodato)
- 1999 – Joe Cassano ft. DJ Lugi, Devonpepse, A. Cassano, Inoki, Camelz, P – Tributo (da Dio lodato)
- 1999 – Inoki e DJ Skizo feat. Royal Rae – Gioventù bruciata
- 1999 – Uomini di Mare ft. Inoki – Entro il 2000 (from Sindrome di fine millennio)
- 2000 – Inoki feat Zippo – Cammino sul tempo (from Missione Impossibile)
- 2001 – Michel ft. Inoki – Siamo noi (from Chempions League)
- 2002 – Shezan Il Ragio ft. Inoki, Lama Islam – Bolo – Collabo (from Randagio Sapiens)
- 2003 – Inoki feat. Tekno Mobil Squad – Battaglia quotidiana (soundtrack film Fuori vena)
- 2004 – Amir and Mr. Phil ft. Inoki – Cosa c'è? (from Naturale)
- 2004 – DJ Shocca ft. Inoki, Royal Mehdi – Bolo by Night (from 60 Hz)
- 2004 – Rischio ft. Inoki, Gora – Lo spettacolo è finito (from Lo spettacolo è finito)
- 2005 – Flaminio Maphia ft. Inoki, Benetti DC, KO – Rapper do vai (from Per un pugno di euri)
- 2005 – Marracash ft. Inoki – Il gioco (da Roccia Music Vol. 1)
- 2005 – Michel ft. Inoki – Cash Dreamin' (from ...Da lontano)
- 2005 – Mr. Phil ft. Amir, Inoki, DJ Double S – Cosa c'è? (Kill Phil Remix) (from Kill Phil)
- 2005 – Mr. Phil ft. Inoki, Lord Bean, DJ Gengiz – Live Illegal (from Kill Phil)
- 2006 – Amir ft. Santo Trafficante, Inoki, Tek Money – Prestigionewkings (from Prestigio Click Bang vol. 1)
- 2006 – DJ Fede ft. Inoki, A. S.K. – Try One More Time (from Rock the Beatz)
- 2006 – Esa aka El Prez ft. Inoki, Killa Tek – Trappole e regole (fromTu sei bravo)
- 2006 – Gel e Metal Carter ft. Inoki, Noyz Narcos – Censura (from I più corrotti)
- 2006 – Gué Pequeno e DJ Harsh ft. Inoki – Più pesante del cielo (from Fastlife Mixtape)
- 2007 – DDP ft. Inoki – Fatti così (from Attitudine)
- 2007 – DJ Skizo ft. Inoki, Tommy Tee – Libero (from Broken Dreams)
- 2007 – Frank Siciliano e DJ Shocca ft. Inoki, Tek Money, DJ Double S – It's the New! (from Struggle Music)
- 2007 – Micrawnauti ft. Inoki – Karateknixxx (from Raw)
- 2008 – Big Aim & Yaki ft. Inoki, Jake La Furia – Per me va bene (from Hagakure)
- 2008 – Big Aim e Yaky ft. Inoki, New Kingz – Street Disco (from Hagakure)
- 2008 – Big Aim e Yaky ft. Inoki, New Kingz – Tu non sei (from Hagakure)
- 2008 – DJ Gengiz & Noyz Narcos ft. Inoki – My Cocktail (from The Best Out Mixtape)
- 2008 – Micromala ft. Inoki e Pass – Malakingz (from Colpo grosso)
- 2008 – Mr Seyo aka Ony ft. Inoki, Tek Money – Streetkingzfreesta (from Back to the Future)
- 2008 – Santo Trafficante ft. Inoki, Duke Montana – Split Personality (from Ghiaccio - Il principio)
- 2008 – Duke Montana ft. Inoki, Seppia – Senza soldi (from Street Mentality)
- 2009 – Gente De Borgata ft. Inoki – Il suono indiscutibile (from Terra terra)
- 2009 – Zinghero ft. Inoki, Chicoria – Il paese delle meraviglie (from Fiji de na lupa)
- 2010 – Nico Royale ft. Inoki, Kalafi – No Friend Gal
- 2010 – Debbit, Corax, Losk e Inoki – Rapocalisse (from Unfamily)
- 2010 – Mic Meskin feat. Inoki – Bolo Giants
- 2010 – Mic Meskin feat. Inoki – Vedo
- 2010 – Mic Meskin feat. Inoki – Nuovo giorno
- 2010 – Mic Meskin feat. Big Noyd, Havoc, Inoki – Bona lè
- 2010 – Wave MC ft. Inoki – Il bivio
- 2010 – Siamesi Brothers & DJ Skizo ft. Inoki – Io ne voglio da te
- 2010 – Timmy Tiran feat. Inoki – Usa e getta
- 2010 – Marciano feat. Inoki – Senti questa musica
- 2011 – Assalti Frontali ft. Inoki ed Esa – Banditi nella sala
- 2011 – Marciano feat. Inoki Ness – On the Rockz
- 2012 – Shafy Click feat. Inoki – Incontenibile
- 2012 – Freestyle Concept feat. Clementino, Inoki Ness & L-Mizzy – Fight
- 2012 – Inoki Ness e Timmy Tiran – Vigile vigila
- 2012 – Mr Chinasky feat. Inoki – Degrado
- 2012 – Lama Islam feat. Nunzio Streetchild, Naser, Mopashà, Inoki Ness – Hip Hop Worldwide
- 2012 – Inoki feat. Simon – Fame RMX
- 2013 – Siruan feat. Inoki – Ingannati
- 2015 – Miss Simpatia feat. Inoki, Tiz – Fase REM
- 2016 – Brain feat. Inoki Ness – Pescatore di sogni
- 2016 – Assalti Frontali feat. Inoki Ness – Mille gruppi avanzano
- 2016 – Zinghero feat. Inoki Ness – Fatto de rap
- 2016 – DJ Skizo feat Inoki Ness – Freshness
- 2016 – 100 Bronx feat. Inoki Ness – Rose bianche
- 2017 – Brain feat. Inoki Ness – Street Requiem
- 2017 – Zinghero & Saga feat. Inoki Ness – Paranoie
- 2017 – Call2Play, Kiave, Terron Fabio, Patto MC, Mattak, GentleT – L'unica soluzione 2.0
- 2017 – Inoki Ness – Barona by Night (RedBull Culture Clash Dubplate)
- 2018 – Vacca feat. Inoki Ness – Blood a Blood
- 2018 – L'Elfo feat. Inoki Ness – Capo
- 2019 – En?gma feat. Inoki Ness – Apatia
- 2019 – DJ Fastcut Feat. Inoki Ness, Lord Madness – Nuvole
- 2019 – Mauras feat. Inoki Ness, Bonnot, Willie Peyote – Capìtalunedi
- 2019 – DJ Enzo feat. Inoki Ness & Vacca – Warriors
- 2020 – Parola Vera feat. Inoki Ness – Slang & Tattoo
- 2020 – HeadShot feat. Inoki Ness, Vacca. Dium, L'Elfo & Niko Pandetta – Bang Bang:HeadShot, Vol.1
- 2021 – Sensei feat. Inoki Ness & L'Elfo – Yin e yang
- 2022 – Jake La Furia feat. Inoki Ness – La cosa giusta
- 2022 – Axos feat. Inoki Ness & Ensi– Padri
- 2022 – Jake La Furia feat. Inoki Ness – La cosa giusta
- 2022 – Vacca feat. Inoki Ness – Real Hustlers
- 2023 – Jamil feat. Inoki Ness – Flash
