= Egreen =

Italian rapper

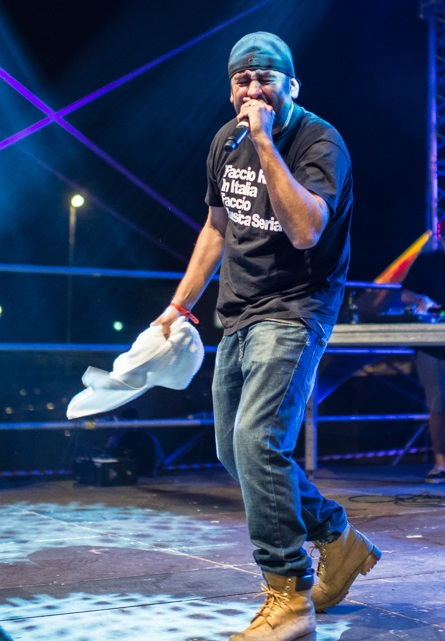
Egreen in a concert.

Nicholas Fantini, better known as Evergreen, abbreviated to Egreen or E-Green (June 19, 1984), is an Italian rapper born in Bogotà, Colombia.

== Biography ==
Born in Bogotà to an Italian father and a Colombian mother, he lived in Colombia for three years and later moved to the United States of America. For a short time he also lived in Geneva and in 1999 he arrived in Italy, settling in Busto Arsizio. The numerous trips during childhood allow him to learn 4 languages (Spanish, English, French and Italian) and to get in touch with very varied cultures and musical styles.

Arrived in Italy he immediately began his career as a rapper, participating in jam and coming into contact with the Hip-Hop scene first in Varese and then in Milan. He made his first demo in 2002, together with Toni Alti and dj Sen, F.U.R.S. (Frustrated Unreleased Rap Shit), as a collection of unreleased tracks in 2006 and two mixtapes between 2010 and 2011: I Spit Vol.0 and I Spit Vol.1. Over time he became known and began to record the first EPs and mixtapes, until in 2011 he joined the Unlimited Struggle label. In this period he publishes the EPs Entropia and Bricks & Hammers, as well as his first official album, Il cuore e la fame, which collects extensive critical acclaim.

Later, in 2014 he released a 7-track EP entitled Entropia 2.

After the collaboration with the collective for professional reasons, he decides to publish an album independently, relying on the crowdfunding platform Musicraiser, through a campaign that ended with a record number of 1818 subscriptions for a collection of over 69,000 euros, surpassing any other similar project ever attempted in Italy. The result of the campaign is the record Beats & Hate, Egreen's second official work.

== Discography ==
=== Albums ===
- 2013 - Il cuore e la fame
- 2015 – Beats & Hate – co-produced by Lvnar.
- 2016 - More Hate
- 2018 - Entropia 3
- 2019 - LO VE (with Nex Cassel)
- 2019 - OG’S (with Craig G and The WZA)
- 2020 - Fine Primo Tempo
- 2022 - Nicolás
- 2023 - Bellissimo (with Sick Budd)
- 2025 - Fare rap non è obbligatorio
- 2025 - Fare rap non è obbligatorio 2

=== Mixtapes ===
- 2009 - I Spit Vol. 0
- 2010 - I Spit Vol.1
- 2015 - I Spit Vol. 1.3
- 2017 - Bengala Mixtape (with Attila)
- 2020 - I Spit Vol. 2

=== EPs ===
- 2008 - F.U.R.S. (Frustrated Unreleased Rap Shit)
- 2010 - Byters - The Unautorised Remixes (with DJ Yodha & L-Blixxx)
- 2011 - Entropia EP
- 2012 - Bricks & Hammers
- 2014 - Entropia 2
- 2016 - A.F.A. EP

=== Collaborations ===
Year	Artist	Titolo	Album di provenienza
2009	E-Green feat. Jack the Smoker & MDT	Fuori per l'ebrezza	I Spit Vol. 0 - Mixtape
2010	Asher Kuno feat. Egreen	Né leggere né scrivere	HallWeedWood Stories Vol.1
2010	Spanish Ed feat. Egreen	La Varese beve	Sotto sorveglianza
2011	Bassi Maestro feat. Reka The Saint and Egreen	I'm nice (on the mic)	Tutti a casa
2011	Don Joe & Shablo feat. Bassi Maestro, Egreen and DJ Shocca	Sopranos	Thori & Rocce
2012	DJ Double S feat. Lefty and Egreen	Freestyle	Al centro della scena
2012	Piranha Clique feat. Egreen	Fireworks	Un Metro Di Campari Mixtape
2013	DJ Ceffo feat. Lucci and Egreen	Ya know the name	Brutti Ceffi Mixtape
2013	Brain feat. Egreen & Lord Madness	Il Triangolo delle Bermuda	Brainstorm II
2013	Brain feat. Egreen	Grasso che cola	Brainstorm II
2013	Simon P & Crine J feat. Egreen and Nex Cassel	Tasche piene	Full coverage
2013	Barracruda feat. Egreen	Il muro	BARRECRUDE MIXTAPE VOL. 3
2013	Vox P feat. Egreen and DJ Tsura	I spit ya	Il rovescio della piramide
2013	Mr. Phil feat. Egreen, Bassi Maestro and DJ Shocca	Sopranos Pt. 2	Poteri forti
2013	Fritz da Cat feat. Egreen	Barzellette	Fritz
2014	K273 feat. Egreen	Risultato perfetto	—
2014	Fetz Darko feat. Egreen	Punk life	Lotta medievale
2014	Pula+ feat. Dargen D'Amico and Egreen	Grazie a nessuno	Non lo so
2014	Deal Pacino feat. Egreen	Dogma	BorderLife Vol. 2
2014	Night Skinny feat. Achille Lauro, Johnny Marsiglia, Ensi, Noyz Narcos, Chicoria, Louis Dee, Er Costa, Clementino, Rocco Hunt, Egreen	Indian Tweet Posse	Zero kills
2014	Mistaman feat. Johnny Marsiglia & Egreen	Ti ammazzo	M-Theory
2014	Unlimited Struggle	Posse Cut	—
2014	Gionni Grano feat. Egreen	Vivere e godere (Remix)	Grano duro
2015	Brenno & Brain feat. Egreen	Faccio fuoco	Incubo
2015	Francesco Paura feat. Egreen	Double dragon	Darkswing
2015	Louis Dee feat. Ensi and Egreen	666	Sto bene all'inferno
2015	Bassi Maestro feat. Egreen and Medda	Penny Hardaway/Troppo Rap	—
2015	Don Diegoh & Ice One feat. Masito and Egreen	Porte chiuse	Latte e sangue
2016	Jake La Furia feat. Egreen	Testa o croce	Fuori da qui
2016	Jamil feat. Egreen	Quanti amici ho perso	Black book 2
2016	Il Turco feat. Egreen	Rap'autore	Rap'Autore
2019	Creep Giuliano & J.O.D Feat. Egreen	Le Conseguenze	Cammina sull'acqua
2019	Lapa feat. Egreen	Z9NA	Over
2019	20900 x 21052 (feat. Egreen & LT.Studio)	20900 x 21052	Principe di Monza EP.
