= Mai Dire Mai =

Mai Dire Mai may refer to:

- Mai dire mai, 2007 album by Italian singer Anna Tatangelo
- Mai dire mai (La locura), 2020 song by Italian rapper Willie Peyote
