= Noyz Narcos =

Italian rapper (born 1979)

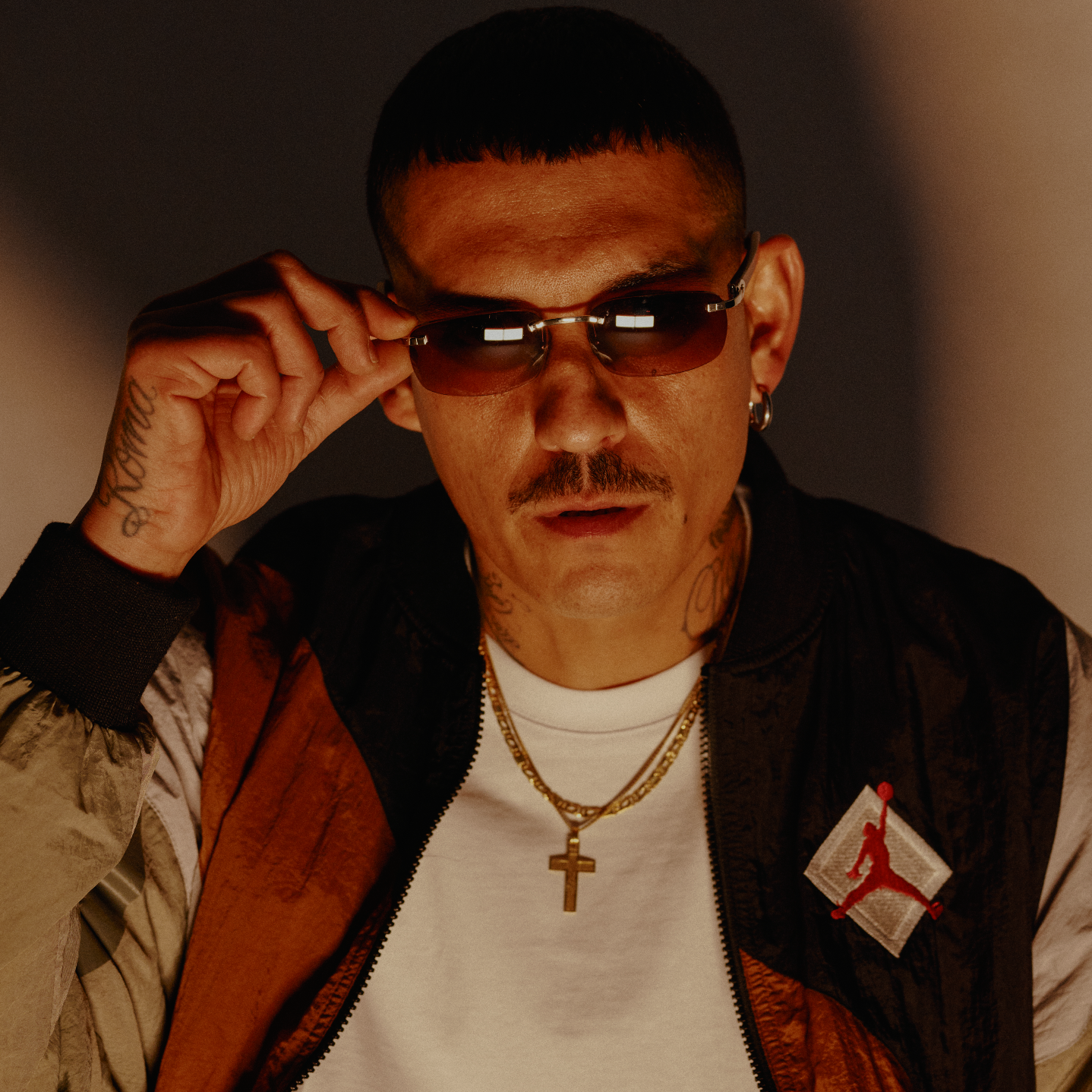
- Noyz Narcos in 2022

Background information
- Also known as: Noyz Narcos
- Born: Emanuele Frasca; 15 December 1979 (age 46); Rome, Italy
- Genres: Hardcore hip hop; horrorcore
- Occupation: Rapper
- Years active: 1996–present
- Label: Propaganda Records

Emanuele Frasca (born 15 December 1979), known professionally as Noyz Narcos or simply Noyz, is an Italian rapper. He is also a member of the Italian hip-hop collective TruceKlan.

== Biography ==
=== La calda notte with Chicoria and Verano zombie (2006–2007) ===
In 2007 Noyz Narcos published Verano zombie, an album in which the instrumental sounds of Non dormire are set aside to move to the equally aggressive beat, but not array of guitar. In the album Metal Carter, Gel, Cole, Mystic One, Duke Montana, Chicoria, collaborated with members of the Truceklan, Danno from Colle Der Fomento, Gué Pequeno, Marracash and Vincenzo da Via Anfossi of Dogo Gang. In the same year, together with representatives of Truceklan and Hawk Nelson Noyz played a part in Mucchio selvaggio, a porn film that has become a cult for fans of Hip Hop.

=== Ministero dell'inferno and the collaboration with DJ Gengis (2008–2009) ===
The Ministero dell'inferno collection was released in March 2008, starring the TruceKlan supported by several well-known names of the Italian hip hop scene like Club Dogo, Kaos One, Santo Trafficante, Fabri Fibra, Gente de Borgata, Danno from Colle Der Fomento, and names totally detached from hip hop context: Cripple Bastards, Miss Violetta Beauregarde and Pinta Facile. The atypical nature of the collaboration, the use of samples from the soundtracks of a certain genre film, the dark atmospheres and the dark beats, lyrics focusing exclusively on existential malaise, urban decay, horrific imagery, faced with cruelty, cynicism and total disenchantment wanted to be a breaking point compared to all the Italian rap compilations released until then. The production of the beats was headed by Lou Chano, Fuzzy, Rough, Don Joe, Noyz Narcos, C.U.N.S., Giordy Beat, DJ Gengis Khan. In addition, he starred with Chicoria, Duke Montana and Cole in the short film Ganja Fiction.

In the same year the mixtape The Best Out Mixtape was released, produced by DJ Genghis Khan. The album saw the participation of many Italian MC and was a great success so as to make it necessary to build a second volume, issued in June 2009.

=== Guilty and B.B.C. with Metal Carter and Duke Montana (2009–2011) ===
On the morning of September 18, 2009, during a drug raid called La calda notte Noyz Narcos was detained without being arrested.

On January 29, 2010, Noyz Narcos released his third studio album Guilty, anticipated by video clips for the songs M3 and Mosche nere, respectively published on November 1, 2009, and January 11, 2010. The album includes collaborations with leading members of the Italian rap scene with Club Dogo, Marracash, Fabri Fibra and many others.

In 2011, Noyz Narcos, Metal Carter and Duke Montana founded the BBC (an acronym for "Black Bandana Click"). The first project was supposed to be the album Klan Related, but after the publication of the video of Metal Carter (Undead), Duke Montana (Anthem) and Noyz Narcos (Drag You to Hell) the project failed due to disagreements between Noyz and Duke and the three tracks are collected in the EP BBC Project Single.

=== The Best of the Beast Tour (2011–2012) ===
On October 15, 2011, Noyz Narcos participated in the "HitWeek Festival" in Miami, together with artists like Caparezza and Casino Royale. After returning from America Noyz started his new tour called The Best of The Beast organized by Live Nation, Propaganda Agency and Propapromoz. The tour was created to announce his upcoming album titled Monster originally planned for 2012 and left October 31 from Novara ending December 26 in Cagliari, included 12 dates in the major clubs in Italy. He was accompanied in the tour by members of the Truceklan Mystic One and DJ Genghis Khan. On January 28, 2012, in Milan accompanied by DJ Genghis Khan Noyz Narcos opened the concert of the Dope DOD on their first European tour. The evening is called "The Wild Beat Massacre".

In February 2012, he released the video for Wild Boys, a piece created in collaboration with Gast. On May 31, he opened the concert in Rome of the U.S. hip-hop collective La Coka Nostra in their Masters of the Dark Arts Tour. On July 23, Noyz Narcos and Metal Carter granted an interview for Vice Italy where they recounted their careers before Truceboys until today. On November 15, he was a guest of The Pills on Deejay TV and the same night he edited his new single video "16 Barre" in collaboration with Aban from his album Ordinary Madness-The Good Side.

=== Monster (2012–2014) ===
On May 22, 2012, the single Game Over was published, anticipating the release of the rapper's fourth studio album, entitled Monster and initially planned for the end of the month. On November 23 by Propaganda Agency, the producers of Monster are announced: Denny The Cool, Joe Don, Frenetik Beat, Fritz da Cat, Fuzzy, Kiquè Velasquez, Mace, Shablo, DJ Sine and The Ortopedic.

On March 13, 2013, the album cover and the date of publication were announced, set for April 9. The same day it was announced the videoclip of Attica, published in the Noyz Narcos YouTube channel on March 18. The album was released by Propaganda Agency and distributed by Sony Music. Through Facebook, Propaganda Agency published the first seven dates of Monster Tour 2013 started on March 30 in Genoa. For the tour Noyz enlisted the help of DJ Genghis Khan, Chicoria and Gast. Monster was composed of various members of the Truceklan such as Chicoria, Metal Carter, Mystic One and Gast, even beyond Nex Cassel and Gionni Gioielli, Aban, Vacca and Tormento. There was another collaboration with Fetz Darko after Cinemacciaio and in the album there are two scratch of DJ Genghis Khan. The album debuted in seventh position of the Italian Ranked album. On April 18, the video Rob Zombie of Salmo in collaboration with Noyz was published, while on May 13 the third video clip from Monster was released, Alfa Alfa.

On July 13, 2013, in Milan he opened the concert of Wu-Tang Clan and two days later he published the video clip of the title track Monster, directed by Trash Secco. Still in 2013, Noyz Narcos embarked on a series of collaborations, including one with Fritz da Cat in the song With or Without It (also attended by the Calibro 35), originally entered in Leaks and later in Fritz, and with DJ Genghis Khan in Casey Jones, inserted in the mixtape Rome Sweet Home.

Between the end of 2013 and beginning of 2014, Noyz Narcos has published two other video clips extracted from Monster: Dope Boys and Drive Solo. The video clips were respectively published on November 20, 2013, and February 14, 2014.

=== Localz Only (2015) ===
In May 2015, Noyz Narcos announced the release of a studio album made in collaboration with the producer Fritz da Cat. Distributed by Universal Music Group, the album is called Localz Only and was scheduled for June 1 of that year. To anticipate the release was the videoclip of the title track Localz Only, released on May 14.

=== Enemy (2018) ===
In March 2018, Noyz Narcos announced the release of his 7th album, made with the producer The Night Skinny. Distributed by Universal Music Group and Thaurus, the album is called "Enemy" and was scheduled for April 20 of that year. To anticipate the release was the videoclip of the title track Sinnò Me Moro, released on April 5. Noyz Narcos - Sinnò Me Moro (Prod. Night Skinny) on YouTube

=== Virus (2022) ===
On December 8, 2021, Noyz Narcos announced the release of his sixth album "Virus" through a video. Five days later, the release of the documentary "Dope Boys Alphabet" was revealed; a documentary showing Noyz's career, from the very beginning to his latest work.

Virus was finally released on January 14, 2022, through Thaurus Music label, mainly produced by The Night Skinny. Many Italian and worldwide artists took part to collaborations, including Gué Pequeno, Sfera Ebbasta and Raekwon from Wu-Tang Clan.

=== Cvlt (2023) ===
This album consists of fifteen tracks and was preceded by a short film directed by Dario Argento, the king of horror. The sound is visibly harsher and heavier than the two rappers' latest works, even if it contains elements of electronic and pop music.

== Discography ==
=== Albums ===
==== Solo ====
- 2005 – Non dormire
- 2006 – La Calda Notte with Chicoria
- 2007 – Verano zombie
- 2008 – The Best Out Mixtape with DJ Gengis Khan
- 2009 – The Best Out Mixtape Vol. 2 with DJ Gengis Khan
- 2010 – Guilty
- 2013 – Monster
- 2015 – Localz Only with Fritz da Cat
- 2018 – Enemy
- 2022 – Virus – No. 1 Italy
- 2023 – Cvlt with Salmo
- 2025 – Funny Games – No. 1 Italy

==== With Truceklan ====
- 2008 – Ministero dell'inferno

==== With Truceboys ====
- 2003 – Sangue

=== Singles ===
==== Solo ====
- 2005 – Non dormire
- 2006 – La Calda Notte with Chicoria
- 2007 – Verano zombie pt. 2
- 2010 – Mosche nere
- 2010 – Sotto indagine
- 2010 – Zoo de Roma
- 2011 – Drag you to Hell
- 2011 – Nemico pubblico
- 2012 – Game Over
- 2013 – Alfa Alfa
- 2013 – Monster
- 2013 – Dope Boys with Nex Cassel

== Extra-musical activities ==
=== TV participations ===
- 2008 – Rapture (All Music)
- 2009 – TRL (MTV) (performance with Club Dogo)
- 2010 – Hip Hop TV 2nd B-Day Party (Hip Hop TV)
- 2011 – Centocelle INK (Flop TV)
- 2011 – Hip Hop TV 3rd B-Day Party (Hip Hop TV)
- 2012 – Hip Hop TV 4th B-Day Party (Hip Hop TV)
- 2012 – The Pills (Deejay TV)
- 2013 – The Flow (Deejay TV)
- 2013 – Hip Hop TV 5th B-Day Party (Hip Hop TV)
- 2024 - Rhythm + Flow: Italia (Hip Hop TV)

=== Radio participations ===
- 2009 – Radio disagio
- 2013 – One Two One Two (Radio Deejay) (with Vacca)
- 2013 – Doppia Acca (Burger Radio)

== Filmography ==
- 2006 – La calda notte
- 2007 – Mucchio selvaggio
- 2008 – Ganja Fiction

=== Soundtracks ===
- 2007 – Mucchio selvaggio
- 2008 – Ganja Fiction
- 2013 – Le formiche della città morta

== Tours ==
- 2010/2011 – Guilty Tour
- 2012 – The Best of The best Tour
- 2013 – Monster Tour
- 2013/2014 – Fritz Tour with Fritz Da Cat and Ensi
- 2014 – Rome Sweet Home Official Tour with DJ Gengis Khan, Il Turco and Er Costa
