= Vacca (rapper) =

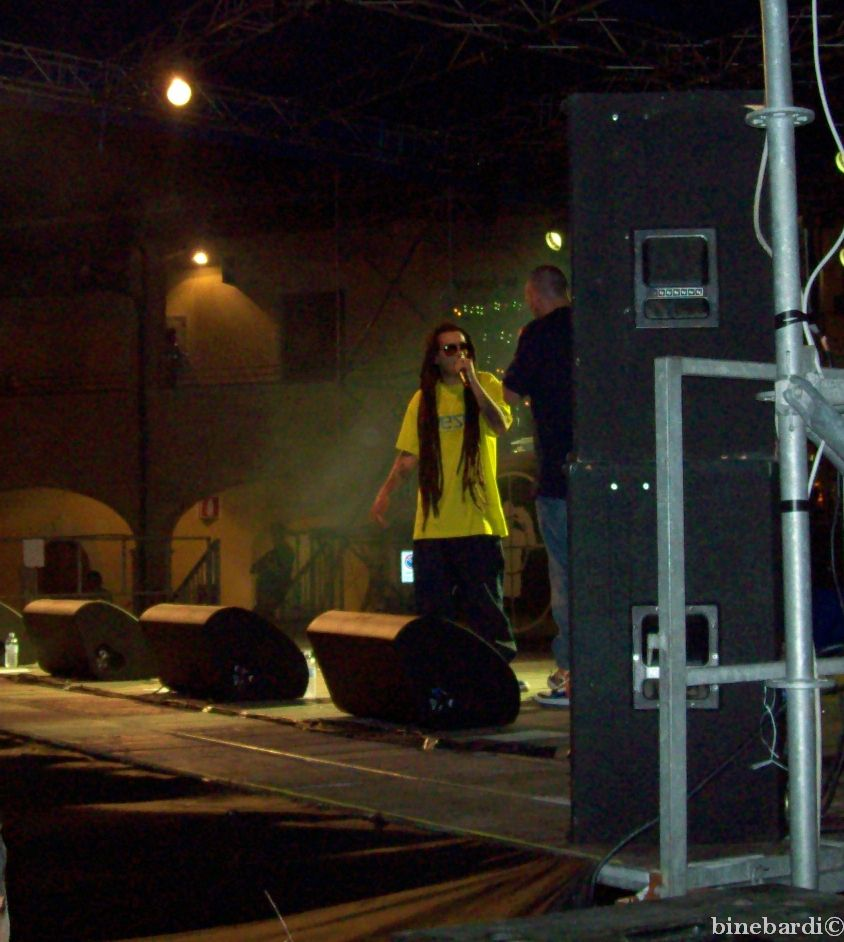

Background information
- Born: Alessandro Vacca; 21 October 1979 (age 46)
- Origin: Cagliari, Sardinia, Italy
- Genres: Hip hop, pop rap
- Years active: 2001–present
- Label: EMI

Vacca also known as Vaccaman, Mr. Vacca, Lil' Mocho or Devil The Rasta (born Alessandro Vacca on 21 October 1979) is an Italian rapper who lives in Kingston.

== Career ==
Vacca was born in Cagliari but he grew up in Milan in the neighborhood of Quarto Oggiaro. The press coverage, mostly in Italian, presents him as a "redeemed" person, who has fought against drug addiction, poverty, and degradation for the sake of his newly created family. From 2001 to 2003, Vacca played with a group called Azhilo Nitro. After this first experience he published the EP Mr. Cartoon, in 2003. Deeply influenced by Jamaican music, he combined rap and reggae in his solo debut album, titled VH, published in May 2004. His music shows evident musical influences of the Casabrasa, a collective of DJs with whom he performed live, featuring electronic instrumentals, and the voice in rap style is consequently brought to marry dancehall and reggae. In 2010 he moved to Kingston, Jamaica, where he lives with his partner, after the birth of his daughter Zuri.

== Discography ==
=== Albums ===
- 2004: VH
- 2007: Faccio quello che voglio
- 2010: Sporco
- 2011: Pelleossa
- 2012: Pazienza
- 2015: L'ultimo tango
- 2018: DON
- 2019: Don Vacca Corleone
- 2020: Bad Reputation
- 2022: Barroso

=== EP ===
- 2003: Mr. Cartoon
- 2009: Non prima delle 6:10
- 2010: Lost In Mi-Nord
- 2021: Tempo Nostro

=== Singles ===
- 2006: Chi sbaglia paga

=== Mixtape ===
- 2008: Poco di buono
- 2009: Don't Say Nothing 1
- 2009: Don't Say Nothing 2
- 2011: Get maad

=== Collaborations ===
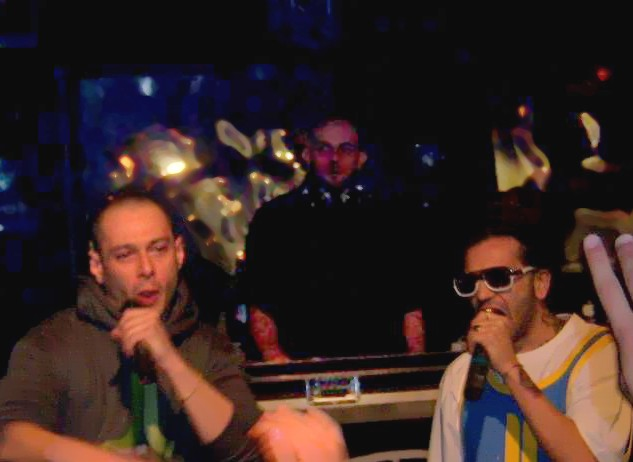
Fabri Fibra (left), Dj Fish (behind) and Vacca (right) in 2008

- 2003: Vacca ft. Esa - Quartieri
- 2003: Nonzeta ft. Vacca - Stile
- 2006: Federica Felini ft. Vacca - Non Fidarti
- 2006: Golden Bass Ft. Vacca - Golden Dub
- 2007: Pesi Piuma (HegoKid & Mars) Ft. Vacca - Scatti Quotidiani
- 2007: Vacca ft. Nesli - Non mi butto giù (FOBC)
- 2007: Vacca ft. Nesli - Il verdetto (FOBC)
- 2007: Vacca ft. Nesli - Spara (FOBC)
- 2007: Vacca ft. Nesli - Tu che ne sai (FOBC)
- 2008: Numeri 2 Ft. Vacca - Occhio Alla Bomba
- 2008: Numeri 2 Ft. Vacca - Come Noi... Come No!
- 2009: Gabo Ft. Vacca - Pesante
- 2009: Entics Ft. Denny e Vacca - Bla Bla
- 2009: Vacca Ft. Daniele Vit - Cartoni & Pop Corn
- 2009: Karkadan Ft. Vacca - Cool Yourm
- 2009: Vacca Ft. Zi Funk - Devi Darla
- 2009: Vacca Ft. Aumrec- Divani
- 2009: Vacca Ft. Daniele Vit - Dna
- 2009: Vacca & Lil Wayne + Dvus - Fearless
- 2009: Vacca Ft. Pie - Infinito Monitor
- 2009: Vacca Ft. Electrofants - Italian Do It Best
- 2009: Vacca Ft. Funkyman & Dj Valerio - Xmas Remix
- 2009: Vacca Ft. Daniele Vit - Non So Come Si Fà
- 2009: Club Dogo Ft. Vacca, Noyz Narcos & Nex Cassel - Sgrilla Remix
- 2009: Vacca Ft. G Nano & Green Peeps - Stanco Morto
- 2009: Vacca Ft. Nacho - Vieni Qua
- 2009: Guè pequeno Ft. Vacca & Daniele vit - Voglio lei
- 2009: Bassi maestro Ft. Babaman & Vacca - Se morissi lunedì
- 2009: Two Fingerz Ft. Vacca - ''Cioccolato
- 2009: Vacca Ft. Emis Killa - xxxmas
- 2010: Vacca Ft. Emis Killa - Mi Prendo Tutto Quanto
- 2010: Ensi Ft. Vacca, Daniele vit, Surfa, Raige, Amir & Dan-t - 2010
- 2010: Big Fish Ft. Vacca & Ensi - Generazione Tuning
- 2010: Vacca Ft. Kuanito, JT & Dinamite - Veleno
- 2010: Giuann Shadai Ft. Vacca - Uomo macchina
- 2010: Vacca Ft. Nacho - Chi Sei Tu?
- 2010: Fra Jamb Ft. Vacca - Allievi
- 2010: Surfa Ft. Vacca - Non Fa Per Te
- 2010: Darme Ft. Vacca & B.Bro - Hip Hop Marley
- 2010: Surfa Ft. Vacca - My Mai
- 2010: G Soave Ft. Vacca - Freshhh
- 2010: Supa Ft. Vacca & Entics - Featuring
- 2010: Vacca Ft. Nacho - 40 Gradi
- 2010: Vacca Ft. B Bro - Pippo Sei Tu?
- 2010: Vacca Ft. Savage - One More Chance
- 2010: Vacca Ft. Mattaman - Non Chiedere Di Me
- 2010: Club Dogo Ft. Vacca, Ensi, Entics & Emis Killa - Spacchiamo Tutto (Remix)
- 2010: Emis Killa Ft Vacca - I'M The Shit
- 2010: Jimmy X Ft Vacca - Ricche Sfondate
- 2010: Exo Ft Jake La Furia Ft Emis Killa Ft Daniele Vit Ft Ensi Ft Luchè Ft Surfa Ft Vacca - Fino Alla Fine
- 2010: Gordo Ft Vacca + G.Nano + Melo + Surfa + D-Strutto + Emis Killa + Denny Lahome + Ensi - Pettinaci (RMX)
- 2010: Vacca Ft Daniele Vit - Voglio Farlo Con Te
- 2011: Sonny PrimoGenito Ft Vacca - Buono A Nulla
- 2011: Vacca + Savage - Over & Over
- 2011: Vacca + Divoice - Buss A Gun
- 2011: Sody feat. Vacca - Tanto (Tanto)
- 2011: EnMiCasa Feat. Vacca - Lacrime E Sorrisi
- 2011: Guè Pequeno feat. Zuli, Emis Killa & Vacca - XXX Pt. 2 (Hardcore)
- 2011: Funky Gigolò feat Vacca - Ragazzacci
- 2011: Don Joe & Shablo feat. Vacca, Jhonny Marsiglia & Aban - Io Non Mi Fido Di Questo Sistema
- 2011: Vacca feat. G.Nano - Volare
- 2011: Ufo feat. Vacca & Reverendo - Fratelli Dispersi
- 2011: Federico Chaves Feat. Vacca - Sola
- 2011: Vacca Feat. Surfa - Universo
- 2011: Vacca feat. Baby-k - Free
- 2011: Vacca feat. J.Simms - Fuck off
- 2011: Vacca Feat. J Simms - Till Di End Of Time
- 2011: Jack The Smoker Feat. Vacca & Egreen - Conto Alla Rovescia
- 2011: Incompatibili Feat. Vacca - Quello Che Mi Và
- 2011: Ludax Feat Vacca & Matt Pawana - Italia
- 2012: Gotik Feat Vacca & Surfa - Solo
- 2012: Vacca Feat Ntò - Kill Dem All
