= DJ Gruff =

Italian rapper (born 1968)

Sandro Orrù (born January 8, 1968, Rome), known as DJ Gruff, Gruffetti, Lowdy N.C.N., Cantabal or Gruffa is a pioneer of the Italian hip hop scene. Known for his original take on rapping and scratching techniques since 1982. He has been active as a turntablist, DJ, beatmaker, rapper and producer.

== Biography ==
DJ Gruff has been a member of a number of groups/collectives/crews such as The place to be (Next One, Carrie D, Igor, Nando- Boogie and Mr Hyde), Casino Royale (Alioscia Bisceglia, Giuliano Palma, Michele Pauli, Ferdinando Masi etc), Radical Stuff (DJ Skizo, Soul Boy, Sean, Top Cat and Kaos One), Alien Army and Isola Posse All Stars, and was among the founders of Sangue Misto (DJ Gruff, Neffa and Deda) recording with them the album SxM, universally acknowledged as a milestone of Italian hip hop. His musical production is vast, including collaborations with musicians, MCs, breakers and street artists from all over the world. Since 1996, he has been collaborating with Alien Army, the collective representing the greatest turntable talents in Italy.

== Career ==
Orru was born in Rome and came into contact with hip hop culture in Turin in 1982. In 1984, his improvised, irreverent rap exclusively in Italian and Italian dialects, started to become popular, thanks to the breakers he was meeting. During a few nights in local venues in Torino, he developed a new approach to playing music -an endless series of mixtapes with extreme scratching sessions conducted on a mixer built for other purposes. Customized switches half melted on a flame, extremely long slides and unsuitable needles could not stop his desire to develop the kind of instrument that in time would become the most popular in the world. In 1986, he became part of the hip hop scene in Milan working with Top Cat, Skizo, Kaos One and Sean among others. While in Milan, Orru joined Fresh Press Crew which subsequently changed its name to Radical Stuff. In 1990 he began playing in concert with Casino Royale and appeared on three of their records. In 1998, Orru signed with PolyGram, though its unclear what his relationship was with the label after its sale in 1999.

In 1995, Gruff moved to Puglia where he lived for three years studying the ancient rhythms of Salento. In 2001, he moved to Japan where he took his turntable techniques to a new level. This brought him to produce Frikkettonism, an eccentric album produced, mixed and printed in Tokyo. The album was released in the Double H Vinyls series in 1,000 hand-numbered copies in double gatefold vinyl, of which the first 600 were in marbled transparent blue vinyl.

In 2014, a meeting with the contemporary trombone player, Gianluca Petrella, resulted in a collaboration exploring an experimental vision where rap, hip hop, scratching and jazz meet. As of 2016, Orru was part of the group ("his group") Gruffetti and the Sinfonaito, which was working on a pair of albums.

In 2019, the album August11th by DJ Gruff & RayZa was released, produced with Gianluca Petrella feat. Reggie Reg from Crash Crew, Grandmaster Caz, Grand Wizzard Theodore, Sadat X, Ekspo, Kemar Williams, Ramtzu, Uomodisu, Antonio Tarantino, Diego Martino, Allien Army and 2ph13b. The album August 11th is a homage to hip-hop culture, born in The Bronx on 11 August 1973 when Kool Herc organized at 1520 Sedgwick Avenue (Bronx, New York) what is considered the first hip hop party in history. Every track on the record has lyrics by RayZa set to music composed by Sandro Orrù a.k.a. Dj Gruff and Gianluca Petrella who with turntables, synths and trombone created their own interpretation of the movement established by legendary pioneers such as Reggie Reg from Crash Crew, Grandmaster Caz, Grand Wizzard Theodore who, along with the hip hop giant Sadat X, are all on the album.

=== Articolo 31 controversy ===
In 1998, DJ Gruff wrote the song "1 vs 2", a verbal assault against Articolo 31, a fellow Italian rap band. Articolo 31 successfully took him to court and had the song removed from Gruff's album Il Suono Della Strada.

== Discography ==
- Let's get dizzy (1990)
- Rapadopa (1992)
- SxM (1994, with Sangue Misto on the Century Vox label)
- Il Contact (1997)
- Zero Stress (1997)
- Il Suono Della Strada (1998)
- Orgasmi Meccanici (1999)
- O Tutto O Niente (1999)
- Tiffititaff (2002)
- Svarioni Premeditati (2002)
- Karasau Kid (2002)
- The End (2003)
- Pecorino Sardo (2003)
- Scientific Experiment (2003)
- Lowdy '82 / '03 (2003)
- Frikkettonism (2004)
- Uno (2005)
- Sandro OB (2009, featuring various artists on the Sinfonie label)
- Phonogruff (end of 2010, noted as his "last official album" as of 2016)
- Le Consequenze Del Bene (after 2016)
- August 11 (2019)
