= Grazie ma no grazie =

Single by Willie Peyote

from the album Sulla riva del fiume
- Language: Italian
- Released: 12 February 2025
- Genre: Funk; hip hop
- Length: 3:25
- Label: Turet; Universal Italia
- Songwriters: Guglielmo Bruno; Alex Andrea Vella; Luca Romeo
- Producers: Daniel Bestonzo; Stefano Genta

Willie Peyote singles chronology
"Entropia" (2025)	"Grazie ma no grazie" (2025)	"Next" (2025)

Music video
- "Grazie ma no grazie" on YouTube

"Grazie ma no grazie" ("Thanks but no thanks") is a 2025 song by Italian singer Willie Peyote, released by Turet and Universal Italia on 12 February 2025. It competed in the Sanremo Music Festival 2025, placing 16th.

== Music video ==
A music video of "Grazie ma no grazie", directed by Nicolò Bassetto, was released on 12 February 2025 via Willie Peyote's YouTube channel.

== Charts ==
Chart performance for "Grazie ma no grazie"
Chart (2025)	Peak position
Italy (FIMI)	16
Italy Airplay (EarOne)	27
