= La Fossa =

Italian rap group

La Fossa is one of the earlier rap groups from Italy and one of the first from the island of Sardinia. They formed in 1996. Unlike fellow Sardinian rap group Sa Razza, La Fossa usually does not rap in Sardinian, and uses primarily Italian lyrics. Their first full-length CD was nevertheless called Around the Rionez, riones (usually spelled with s) being a Sardinian term for neighbourhood. Some of their main influences are rappers like Kid Frost, N.W.A, and Master P.

== Members ==
- Wigsoo
- Martinez
- Guapo
- Gravez
- Skaz
- Quilo (former member)
- Biggaman
- Moro

== Discography ==
- 1997 self-titled, featuring SR Raza et Concilio VIII (Rhyme Racket)
- 1998 Around the Rionez, featuring Flaminio Maphia + SR Raza (CD Club)
- 2001 Tre (Original Beat Rec.)
