= Rock TV =

- Country: Italy

Programming
- Language(s): Italian
- Picture format: 4:3 SDTV

Ownership
- Owner: Seven Music Entertainment
- Sister channels: Hip Hop TV

History
- Launched: 2001

Links
- Website: http://www.rocktv.it/

Rock TV is an Italian music TV channel based in Milan. It is devoted to rock, alternative rock, heavy metal and punk rock, and launched in Italy on SKY Italia channel 718 in 2001. Produces also Rock Wave, a radio program on air on Rai Radio 2. The owner is Seven Music Entertainment, owned by Gianluca Galliani, son of Adriano Galliani.

== Programs ==
- Rock News
- Heavy Rotation
- Italians Do It Better
- Morning Glory
- Database
- Zone
- Salaprove
- Rock TV Live
- My Rock TV
- On The Road
- Doctor Ringo
