= Hip Hop TV =

- Country: Italy

Programming
- Language(s): Italian
- Picture format: 4:3 SDTV

Ownership
- Owner: Seven Music Entertainment
- Sister channels: Rock TV

History
- Launched: 1 October 2008

Links
- Website: http://www.hiphoptv.it/

Hip Hop TV is an Italian music TV channel devoted to hip hop, rap and rhythm and blues music, launched in Italy on SKY Italia channel 720 on 1 October 2008 with the song Laffy Taffy by D4L. The owner is Seven Music Entertainment, owned by Gianluca Galliani, son of Adriano Galliani.

== Programming ==
- Mi Casa
- My Hip Hop TV
- Urban Charts
- Spin That Shit
- Club Me
- Open Mic
