= Sangue Misto =

Italian hip hop band

Sangue Misto was an Italian band, one of the first groups of Italian hip hop. It was formed in Bologna in the early 1990s. Its members included Neffa and Deda (rappers, producers), and DJ Gruff (rapper, DJ, producer). Their only album, SXM (1994), "revolutionized the world of italian rap forever" and made the band "one of the most influential in the mid-1990s" in Italy.

== Overview ==
Sangue Misto was one of the first groups of Italian hip hop; it was formed in Bologna in the early 1990s, "from the remains of the legendary Isola Posse All Stars", and its base point was the social center called the Isola nel Kantiere. In the beginning the group also included Papa Ricky, DJ Fabbri, and Gopher D, who left the group before its first release to dedicate themselves to raggamuffin and reggae music.

Their debut album SXM was released in 1994, obtaining great underground support and becoming a model of genuine hip hop music even today but, because of the distribution, the record had marketing problems, so the original SXM in its first issue is somewhat rare.

After this every member left the band to pursue a solo career.

In 2005, SXM was remastered and re-issued.
