= Deda =

Deda may refer to:

- Deda (ethnic slur), a derogatory slur for Bengali Hindus in Bangladesh
- Deda, Romania
- Deda, Albanian surname
  - Eltar Deda, Albanian politician
  - Ferdinand Deda (1941–2003), Albanian composer, conductor and instrumentalist
  - Julian Deda (born 1981), Albanian comedian and actor
  - Zef Deda (1950–2023), Albanian comedian and stage actor
- Deda, Ukrainian surname
  - Myroslav Deda (born 1999), Ukrainian footballer
  - Yaroslav Deda (born 1999), Ukrainian footballer
- Deda, American rapper; see Lost & Found: Hip Hop Underground Soul Classics#Deda The Original Baby Pa
