= Mai dire mai (La locura) =

2021 single by Willie Peyote

Single by Willie Peyote
- Language: Italian
- Published: 4 March 2021
- Genre: Alternative hip hop
- Songwriter(s): Willie Peyote

"Mai dire mai (La locura)" ("Never Say Never (Madness)") is a single by Italian rapper Willie Peyote, released on 4 March 2021, most known for its participation at the 71st edition of the Sanremo Music Festival.

== Description ==
The song contains a sampling of a line by Valerio Aprea recited in the last episode of the third season of the television series Boris, already included in the title la locura.

The piece was performed for the first time by the artist on the occasion of his participation in the Sanremo Music Festival 2021, finishing sixth in the final evening but winning the Mia Martini Critics' Award.

== Videoclip ==
The video, shot in Cuneo, was published on 5 March 2021 through the rapper's YouTube channel.

== Charts ==
Chart (2021)	Peak position
Italy (FIMI)	8
Italy Airplay (EarOne)	20
San Marino (SMRRTV Top 50)	24

== Certifications ==
Region	Certification	Certified units/sales
Italy (FIMI)	Gold	35,000^{‡}
^{‡} Sales+streaming figures based on certification alone.
