= Ensi (rapper) =

Italian rapper proficient in freestyle

- Birth name: Jari Ivan Vella
- Born: 13 December 1985 (age 39)
- Origin: Alpignano, Piemonte, Italy
- Genres: Hip hop, Hardcore rap, Alternative rap
- Years active: 2002–present
- Labels: Tanta Roba

Jari Ivan Vella (born 13 December 1985), known professionally as Ensi, is an Italian rapper proficient in freestyle. He won the first edition of MTV Spit in 2012.

== Discography ==
=== With the OneMic ===
- 2005: Sotto la cintura
- 2011: Commerciale

=== Solo albums ===
- 2008: Vendetta
- 2012: Era tutto un sogno
- 2014: Rock Steady
- 2017: V
- 2019: Clash

=== Singles ===
- 2009: "Terrone"

=== Collaborations ===
- 2003
  - Canebullo ft. Ensi - E se non fossimo così???
- 2004
  - 21 Grammi ft. Ensi - Zitti
- 2005
  - Gli Inquilini ft. Ensi, Willie Dbz, Easy One & Maloscantores
  - DJ Double S ft. Ensi & Raige - Faccio muovere le teste
- 2006
  - Raige & Zonta ft. Ensi - Cuore
  - Raige & Zonta ft. Ensi - Blu
  - Dynamite Soul Men ft. Ensi - Dynamite Ensi OneMic
  - DJ Double S & Dj Kamo ft. Ensi - The Zamurriata Taurinense
  - Rubo ft. Ensi - Longevity
  - Rubo ft. Ensi - Inevitabile (1600 giorni)
- 2007
  - Kiave ft. Ensi & DJ Tsura - Pazienza
  - Rayden ft. Ensi & Raige - Noi
  - Rayden ft. Ensi - Sin City
  - Rayden ft. Ensi, Raige & Lil'Flow - La Uannamaica
  - DJ Tsura & Luda ft. Ensi & Fat Joe - Make It Rain
  - DJ Double S ft. Ensi - Intro
  - DJ Double S ft. Ensi - Torino Top Flow
  - DJ Double S ft. Ensi - Quattro Lettere
  - DJ Double S ft. Ensi - Outro
- 2008
  - Jake La Furia ft. Ensi & 'Nto - Libro Senza Cuore
  - Mondo Marcio ft. Ensi - Che ti piaccia o no
  - Tormento & El Presidente ft. Ensi - Non è poco
  - Daniele Vit ft. Ensi - Tu Non Immagini prod. Fish -
- 2009
  - Raige ft. Ensi e Rayden - Di che parlo
  - Raige ft. Ensi - Sempre qui
  - Raige ft. Ensi e Rayden - Una volta e per sempre
  - Raige ft. Ensi - Non è uguale
  - DJ Nais ft. Ensi & Raige - Non Voglio Problemi
  - DJ Nais ft. Ensi - La Mia Gente
  - P-Easy ft. Ensi, Evergreen, Libo, Rayden, Asher Kuno, Pula & Tommy Smoka - " V.I.P. Superstarz"
  - Maxi B ft. Ensi & Michel - Certi Amici
  - DJ Fede ft. Ensi - Stessi Guai
  - Gué Pequeno ft. Ensi - "Grand Royal"
  - Bassi Maestro & Babaman ft. Ensi & Supa - "Ad Ogni Costo (Rap-Or-Die)"
  - Brain ft. Ensi, Prosa & Michasoul - "Sono"
  - Fratelli Quintale ft. Ensi - "Come Fa"
  - Rayden ft. Ensi, Raige & DJ Double S - "Timeline"
  - Rubo ft. Ensi & Radio Rade - "XXXXL (Heavy Rap)"
  - Rubo ft. Ensi, Speaker Cenzou, Brain, Pensie & Fure Boccamara - "Figli Dei '90s"
  - Two Fingerz ft. Ensi - Pensare Meno
  - Big Fish ft. Ensi & Vacca - Generazione Tuning
  - 'Nto, Ensi & Entics - Nient'altro
- 2010
  - DJ Jad ft. Ensi - Così lontani
  - Vacca ft. Ensi - Miliardo
  - Club Dogo ft. Ensi, Entics, Vacca & Emis Killa - Spacchiamo tutto
  - Exo ft. Jake La Furia, Emis Killa, Ensi, Luchè, Surfa, Vacca e Daniele Vit - Fino alla fine
  - Emis Killa ft. Ensi - Ho visto (prod. Rayden)
  - Purple Finest ft. Ensi - Come si può (da Pure Pleasure)
- 2011
  - Sody feat. Danti, Ensi, Daniele Vit - Il genio della lampo
  - Guè Pequeno feat. Entics, Ensi, 'Nto, Marracash, Jake La Furia & Nex Cassel - Big!
  - Mondo Marcio Feat. Ensi & Palla - Cos´hai di nuovo
  - louis Dee Feat. Ensi - non ci prendiamo in giro
  - Entics feat. Ensi - Equilibrio
  - MixUp feat. Chief & Ensi - Milano Libera Tutti
  - Emis Killa feat. Ensi - Il Resto Del Mondo
  - Nex Cassel feat. Ensi - Paura E Soldi
  - Emis Killa feat. Ensi - Tutti In Catene
  - Bassi Maestro feat. Ensi - Sopra La Cintura
- 2012
  - Max Brigante feat. Ensi - Allenatichefabene Remix
  - El Raton, Ensi, Salmo, En?gma, Bassi Maestro, Rocco Hunt, Gemitaiz - King's Supreme
  - Guè Pequeno feat. Ensi & Zuli - Forza campione
  - Lil' Pin, Kennedy & DJ Yodha feat. Mistacabo & Ensi - Un'altra bomba
