= Dargen D'Amico =

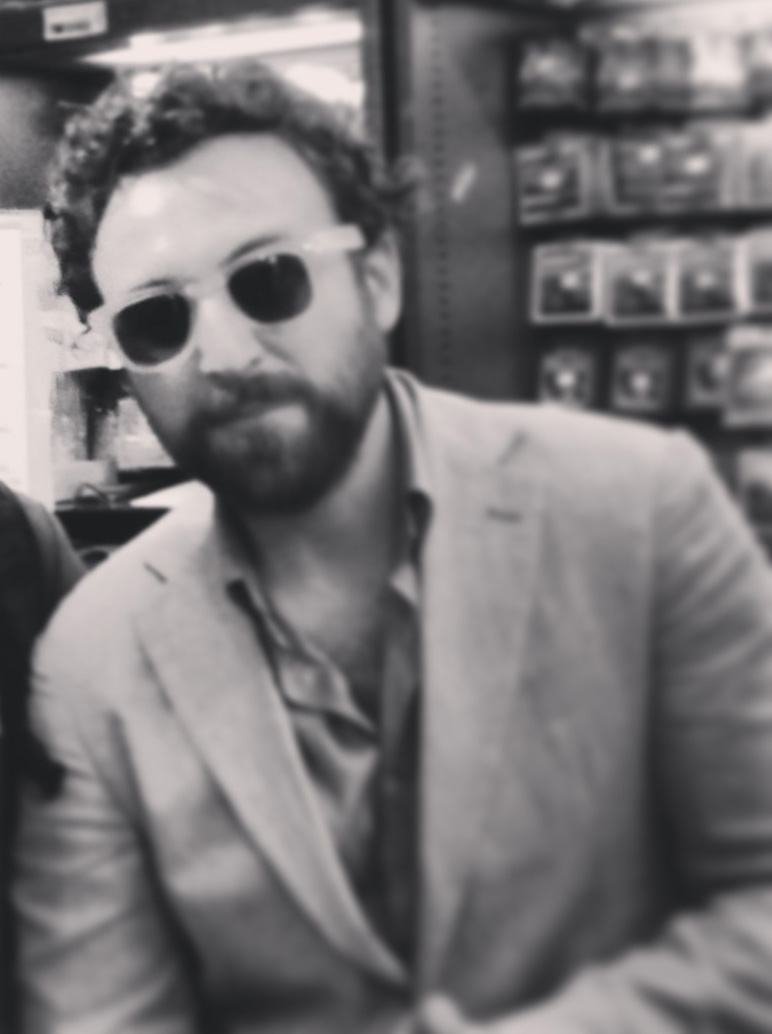

Background information
- Also known as: Corvo D'Argento; JD
- Born: Jacopo D'Amico; 27 November 1980 (age 45); Milan, Lombardy, Italy
- Genres: Hip hop; pop rap
- Occupations: Rapper; singer; songwriter; record producer; disc jockey
- Years active: 1997–present

Jacopo Matteo Luca D'Amico (born 27 November 1980), known by his stage name Dargen D'Amico (Italian pronunciation: [ˈdardʒen daˈmiːko]), is an Italian rapper, singer, songwriter, record producer and disc jockey.

He started his career in 1997, as member of the rap group Sacre Scuole, with Gué Pequeno and Jake La Furia. In 2001, after releasing their first album (3 MC's al cubo), the group disbanded due to quarrels between him and Jake La Furia.

After the experience with Sacre Scuole, Dargen D'Amico went on a solo career by releasing in 2006 the debut album Musica senza musicisti, published by Giada Mesi, an independent record label he founded.

In more than 15 years of career he produced a total of 10 albums, covering various themes and genres, and he collaborated with many Italian musicians, singers and rappers of various genres. He mentions Franco Battiato, Enzo Jannacci and Lucio Dalla as his biggest influences. In 2012, he duetted with Max Pezzali in a rap version of "Hanno ucciso l'Uomo Ragno".

D'Amico participated in the Sanremo Music Festival 2022 with "Dove si balla". He competed again competing in the festival in 2024 with the song "Onda alta".

On 30 November 2025, he was announced among the participants of the Sanremo Music Festival 2026. He competed with the song "AI AI", which placed 27th.

== Discography ==
=== Studio albums ===
==== With Sacre Scuole ====
- 2000 – 3 MC's al cubo (Funk-U-Low)

==== Solo career ====
- 2006 – Musica senza musicisti (Giada Mesi)
- 2008 – Di vizi di forma virtù (Talking Cat / Universal)
- 2010 – D' parte prima
- 2010 – D' parte seconda
- 2011 – CD'
- 2012 – Nostalgia istantanea
- 2013 – Vivere aiuta a non-morire
- 2015 – D'Io

==== With Macrobiotics ====
- 2011 – Balerasteppin

=== Singles ===
- 2008 – Dargen D'Amico – "Sms alla Madonna"
- 2008 – Dargen D'Amico feat. Two Fingerz – "Ex contadino"
- 2010 – Dargen D'Amico – "40 anni"
- 2010 – Dargen D'Amico – "Ma dove vai (Veronica)"
- 2010 – Dargen D'Amico feat. Two Fingerz – "In loop (La forma di un cuore)"
- 2011 – Dargen D'Amico feat. Daniele Vit – "Odio volare"
- 2011 – Dargen D'Amico – "Van Damme (Saddam)"

=== Collaborations ===
- 1997 – Chief & Corvo D'Argento & Guè Pequeno
- 1998 – Chief & Zippo & Sacre Scuole
- 1997 – Il Circolo – Fuori Dalla Mischia
- 1997 – Cani da Sfida – Cani Da Sfida
- 1998 – Chief ft Dargen D'Amico – Nient'altro che ...
- 1999 – Dr. Macallicious (Chief) ft. Sacre Scuole – "Stato Alterato Di Coscienza"
- 1999 – Prodigio ft. Dargen D'Amico – Mi Hanno Raccontato
- 1999 – Prodigio ft. Dargen D'Amico – Buona La Prima
- 2001 – Sacre Scuole – Comodi Comodi
- 2001 – Dargen D'Amico ft Don Joe – Bug a Boo Parody
- 2004 – Club Dogo ft. Dargen D'Amico – Tana 2000
- 2005 – Chief ft. Dargen D'Amico – Uno, nessuno, centomila
- 2007 – Crookers ft. Dargen D'Amico – Nchlinez
- 2008 – Fabri Fibra ft. Dargen D'Amico e Alborosie – Un'altra chance
- 2008 – TwoFingerz ft. Dargen D'Amico e Joe Fallisi – Oltre Il Mare
- 2009 – Crookers ft. Dargen D'Amico e Danti – Giorno'n'nite
- 2009 – Bugo ft. Dargen D'Amico – Buone maniere (The big salt water clock REMIX)
- 2009 – Fabri Fibra ft. Dargen D'Amico – Via vai
- 2009 – Two Fingerz + Vacca ft. Dargen D'Amico – Sassi dal cavalcavia
- 2009 – Two Fingerz ft. Dargen D'Amico – Fiori nei cannoni
- 2009 – Amari ft. Dargen D'Amico – Dovresti dormire
- 2009 – Radio Rade ft. Dargen D'Amico – Regina Del Quartiere
- 2009 – Jody Bipolare ft. Dargen D'Amico – Musica
- 2009 – Diplo ft. Dargen D'Amico & Phra – Natale Exclusive
- 2010 – Crookers ft. Dargen D'Amico & Fabri Fibra – Festa Festa
- 2010 – Crookers ft. Dargen D'Amico, The Very Best & Marina – Birthday Bash
- 2010 – Rischio ft. Dargen D'Amico, Lugi & Danti – Dose di pace
- 2010 – Fabri Fibra ft Dargen D'Amico – Nel mio disco
- 2010 – Fabri Fibra ft Dargen D'Amico – Insensibile
- 2010 – Two Fingerz ft. Dargen D'Amico – Blu
- 2010 – Two Fingerz ft. Dargen D'Amico – Nessuno Ascolta (Na nana nana)
- 2010 – Two Fingerz ft. Dargen D'Amico & Sewit Villa – Buffo
- 2010 – Two Fingerz ft. Dargen D'Amico – Puttana
- 2010 – Two Fingerz ft. Dargen D'Amico – Credi Che T'Amo
- 2010 – Two Fingerz ft. Dargen D'Amico – Automatico
- 2010 – Two Fingerz ft. Dargen D'Amico – Erba
- 2010 – Two Fingerz ft. Dargen D'Amico – Reverse
- 2010 – Zoy ft. Dargen D'Amico – Colori
- 2010 – Emiliano Pepe ft 'Dargen D'Amico – Giurami che ci sei
- 2011 – Fog Prison (Braka, Pablo, Ide) album: Fiero Prigioniero ft. Dargen D'Amico – La trappola più antica
- 2011 – LuckyBeard (Phra) ft. Dargen D'Amico & Dumbblonde – La cassa spinge
- 2011 – Don Joe & Shablo ft. Reverendo + Chief + Mixup + Dargen D'Amico – Guarda Bene
- 2011 – Marracash feat Dargen D'Amico and Rancore – L'albatro
- 2011 – Fratelli Calafuria feat Dargen D'Amico – Disco Tropical
- 2011 – Fabri Fibra feat Dargen D'Amico e Marracash – Tranne Te (ExtraRemix)
- 2011 – Useless Wooden Toys feat Dargen D'Amico – Pioverà Benza
- 2011 – 3 is a Crowd feat Dargen D'Amico and Tommaso Cerasuolo – Chiusi a Chiave
- 2012 – Max Brigante feat Dargen D'Amico, Danti and Ensi – Allenatichefabene Remix
- 2012 – Dargen D'Amico ft Two Fingerz – Hit Da 5 Minuti
- 2012 – Andra Mirò ft Dargen D'amico – Senza che nulla cambi
- 2022 - Rkomi ft Dargen D’amico - MALEDUCATA
