= Kaos One =

Italian rapper, beatmaker, and writer

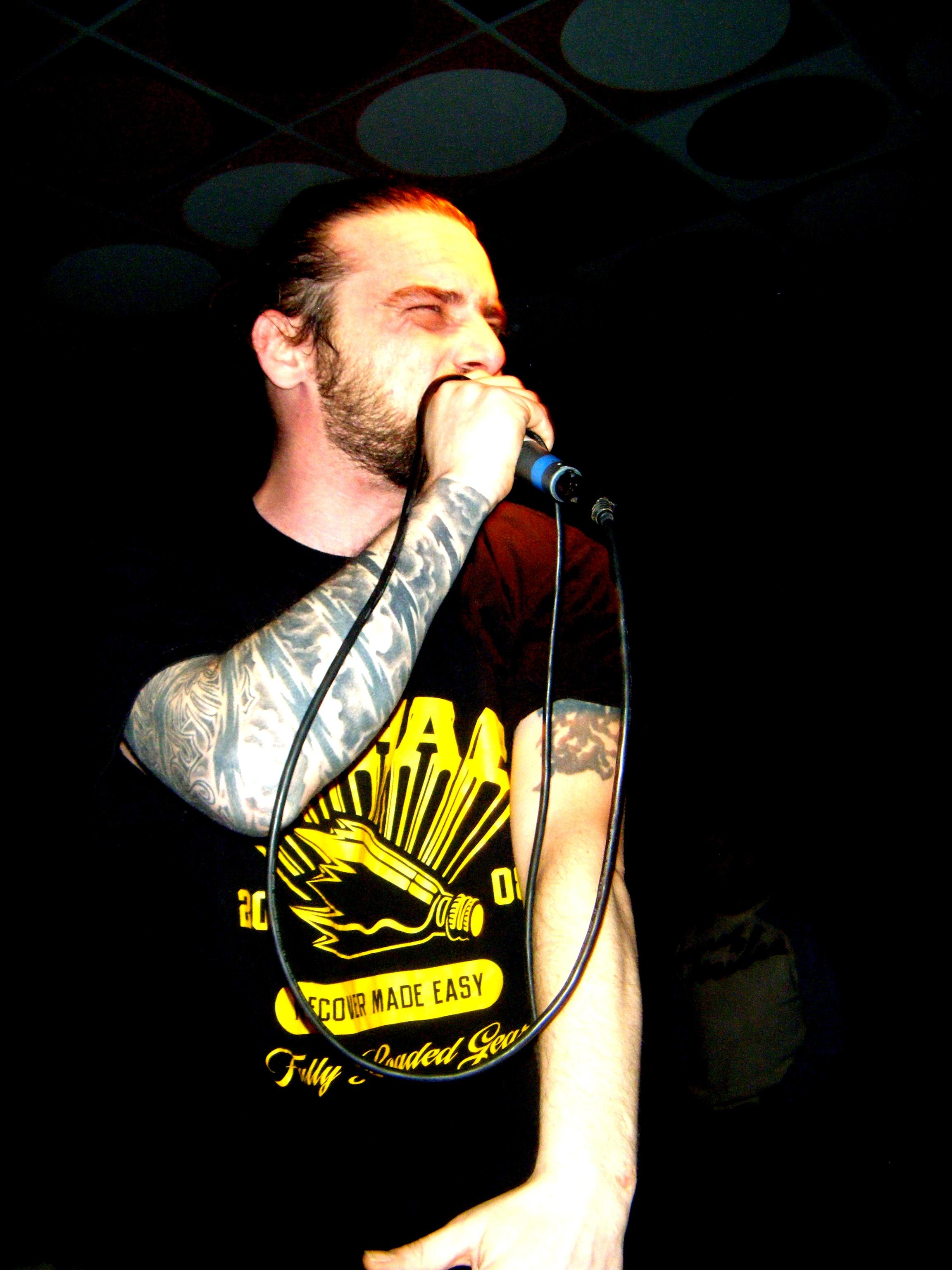
- Kaos One live 2010
- Born: Marco Fiorito; June 11, 1971 (age 55); Caserta, Italy
- Occupations: Rapper; beatmaker; writer

Marco Fiorito (born June 11, 1971), known as Kaos One or simply Kaos, is an Italian rapper, beatmaker, and writer. He began his career in 1986 in Milan, first as a breakdancer and writer, then as an MC, first in English and then in Italian.

== Music career ==
=== Formation and early years ===
In 1986, a former writer known as Kaos, DJ Gruff, and American MC Top Cat established the Fresh Press Crew. The group's lineup was soon expanded to include DJ Skizo and Sean Martin. Dre Love later joined the collective, prompting a name change to Radical Stuff.

Radical Stuff debuted their first single, "Let's Get Dizzy", in 1989, followed by "I Guess You Know" in 1990. Their engagement with jazz elements was marked by a live album collaboration with Lo Greco Bros, resulting in "The Jazzy Rap Night Live" LP, released in 1992. The group sustained their momentum with singles "Summer Fever" (1993) and "On tha Run" (1994).

In 1993, Kaos ventured into collaborations outside the group, notably with DJ Gruff on the album "Rapadopa", which featured "Don Kaos", and with Colle der Fomento on the track "Hello, hello I hate the hard".

=== Solo work and later collaborations ===
Radical Stuff's second album, "Hardaswallow", was released in 1994. Kaos then focused on his solo career, releasing his first album in Italian, "Fastidio" (Discomfort), in 1996, featuring collaborations with Neffa (credited as Piscopo), MDee, Loudy NCN, and Sean. He continued this partnership with Neffa on the album "Neffa & i Messaggeri della Dopa", contributing to tracks "I Messaggeri Pt.1" and "I fieri B-Boyz". Neffa played a significant role in "Fastidio", producing most of its tracks.

In 1997, he was featured on Chief & Soci's "Gruff Zero Stress" and contributed to the soundtrack of "Torino Boys" with "Quando vengo a prenderti". He also appeared on Neffa's "107 elementi" album on the track "Strategie dell'universo".

In 1998, Kaos released "Kaos '98 Remix", an album of remixes from "Fastidio". His productive streak continued into 1999 with the release of "Cose preziose", which was included in "Novecinquanta" by Fritz Da Cat, alongside Sean and Chico MD of Sangue Misto group Melma & Merda, culminating in the album "Merda & Melma".

The same year saw the release of "L'attesa", a collaboration with Freaktons, Chico MD, Neffa, and Kaos, marking a prolific end to the decade.

=== 2002-2011 ===
==== 2002: Neo Ex project ====
In 2002, the Neo Ex project was initiated by Kaos and Gopher, resulting in the release of "The Missing Disc." This album featured contributions from Moddi MC, Phase 2, Turi, Lugi, and B. Soulee.

==== 2006: Participation in "The Original" and Red Bull Homegroove ====
Kaos contributed to "The Original" project, spearheaded by Speaker Dee Mo with Franco Micalizzi as the composer. This collaboration aimed to merge Italian hip hop artists with Micalizzi's compositions. The Red Bull Homegroove concert, held on May 30, 2006, at Milan's Rolling Stone venue, showcased this integration with performances by the Big Bubbling Band, MCs, B-boys, and DJs. A recording from this concert was later released, and a subsequent performance occurred on December 20, 2006, at the Teatro Palladium in Rome.

==== 2007: Karma album ====
Karma, released in October 2007, was produced by Kaos along with DJ Trix, Don Joe, DJ Shablo, Mace, and DJ Silver. The album featured several Italian hip hop artists, including Turi, Club Dogo, Colle Der Fomento, and Moddi MC.

==== 2011: BBeat Project and Post Scripta Album ====
In collaboration with Deda, Kaos produced two tracks for the Hypnosis collective project under the alias BBeat in 2011. His subsequent album, "Post Scripta," was released on November 11, 2011. It achieved notable placements in iTunes' "Hip-Hop" category and overall sales in Italy. The release was accompanied by promotional efforts, including a new official website, a Twitter profile, and a YouTube video for one of the tracks. The album was discussed in detail on Rai Radio 2's Babylon program, marking a rare media appearance by Kaos.

==== Multidisciplinary contributions to hip hop ====
Kaos has contributed to the hip hop genre not only as a performer but also behind the scenes as a writer, breaker, MC, and DJ. His compositions have been featured in his work and that of other artists, including Joe Cassano. In 2011, his album "Post Scripta" was awarded the best album of the year at the Hip Hop Hano Award, based on a public vote.

== Discography ==
=== Soloist ===
- 1996 - Fastidio
- 1999 - L'attesa
- 2007 - Karma
- 2011 - Post Scripta
- 2015 - Coup de Grace

=== With Radical Stuff ===
- 1989 – Let's Get Dizzy (single)
- 1990 – I Guess U Know (single)
- 1992 - The Jazzy Rap Night - Live (with Lo Greco Bros.)
- 1993 – Summer Fever (single)
- 1994 - Hardaswallow
- 1994 – Ontha Run (single)
- 1999 – Let's Get Dizzy (feat. MC Top Cat and Soul Boy) (single)

=== With Melma & Merda ===
- 1999 - Merda & Melma

=== With Neo Ex ===
- 2002 - L'anello mancante (EP)

=== Feats ===
- 1999 - Cose preziose - Fritz Da Cat

== Videography ==
=== Video albums ===
- The Originals: Video of the concert held on May 30, 2006, at Rolling Stone in Milan, released as an attachment to Groove Magazine.

=== Music videos ===
- 2011: "Le 2 metà"
- 2013: "Prison Break"
- 2015: "Coup de grâce"
- 2022: "Titanic"

=== Appearances in other videos ===
- Appears among various exponents of the Italian underground scene in the video "Ce n'è" by Otierre, where he is seen at the console.
- Featured in the video "Aspettando il sole" by Neffa and also appears with other MCs in "Born to be Abramo" by Elio e le Storie Tese (1997), in some of the video segments.
- Appeared in the music video for "Sergio Leone" by Colle der Fomento as a drummer.
