= Duke Montana =

Italian rapper

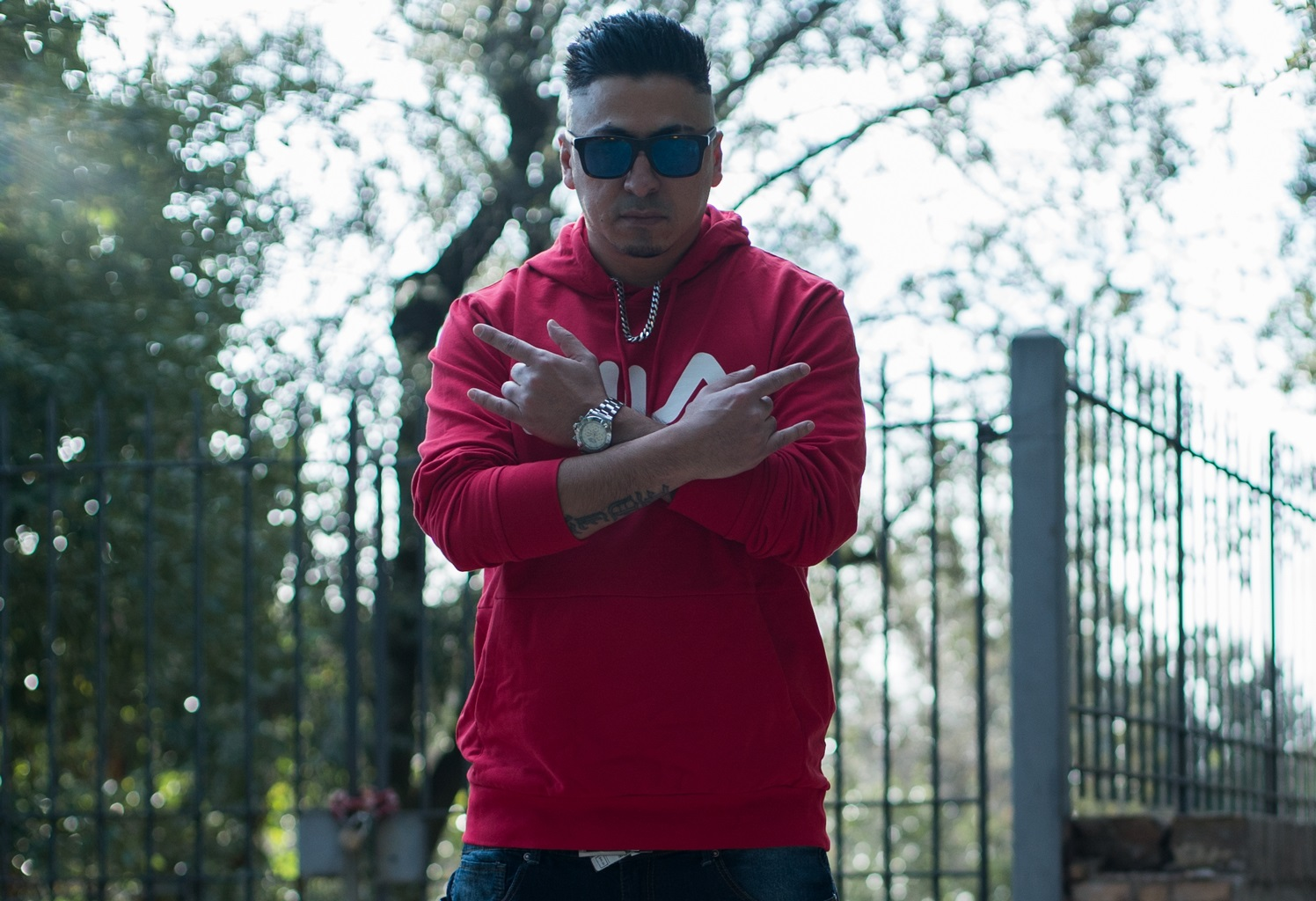
- Duke Montana in 2016

Background information
- Also known as: The King of Rap, Grind Muzik Rap King
- Born: Duke Barker
- Origin: Italy
- Genres: Rap; trap; hip hop
- Occupations: Rapper, actor, author, businessman
- Instruments: Rapping, turntables
- Years active: 1990–present
- Labels: Sony BMG; Kazal; Golden Age Label; Virgin

Duke Montana, stage name of Duke Barker, better known as Grind Muzik Rap King or The King of Rap is an Italian-American rapper, actor, author and businessman. He collaborated with several Italian and American rappers, including Snoop Dogg, Kool G Rap, Lil Ortega, Onyx, Club Dogo, Fabri Fibra, Wu-Tang Clan, Coolio, and Ice-T. He is the father of the Multi-Platinum producer Sick Luke.

== Personal life and early career ==
Duke Montana was born in Rome to an American father and Italian mother. In the early years of his life he lived in Santa Ana, Los Angeles. In the early 1990s, when he was fourteen, Montana founded his first hip-hop collective, Power Mc's, together with the producer Ice One and Julie P. with which he released the Power to the People LP. He also collaborated with important members of the American rap scene including Onyx, Ice-T, Wu-Tang Clan and starred in the film Le amiche del cuore, directed by Michele Placido, playing the role of himself.

== Career ==
In 2011, Montana released the album Grind Music II, self-produced and distributed by Edel Music. In the same year he published his further album, Stay Gold, produced by Sick Luke. It included collaboration with the American hip-hop group Onyx ("Bloodsport"), Club Dogo ("Carta Viola"), Fabri Fibra ("Alphabet Killers"), and other mainstream and underground rappers. In 2012, he recorded the track "Smashin' (Italian Remix)" featuring Onyx and The Beatnuts. Currently he is the president of Golden Age Biz, his personal label, which has a partnership with Sony BMG for distribution and Live Nation Entertainment for his live tours. It also deals with the production of Black Barz and other emerging underground rappers. On 15 July 2012, Montana opened the first and the only Italian date of the American rapper Wiz Khalifa, in Milan, together with Fedez.

=== Cinema ===
- 1992 – Le amiche del cuore directed by Michele Placido.
- 2016 – Zeta, film

== Discography ==
=== Albums ===
- 1991 – Power to the People (Power Mc's)
- 2000 – Atlantis Land – Virgin Records
- 2008 – Ministero dell'Inferno (Truceklan) – Propaganda Records
- 2008 – Street Mentality – Propaganda Records
- 2010 – Grind Muzik Mixtape – Propaganda Records
- 2012 – Grind Muzik II prod. Don Joe, Shablo, Sick Luke – Edel Music
- 2012 – Stay Gold prod. Don Joe and Sick Luke – Sony BMG
- 2013 – Black Barz Mixtape – Golden Age Label
- 2014 – Grind Muzik 3 Mixtape – Sony BMG
- 2016 – Raw – Sony BMG
- 2018 – Grind Muzik 4 – Kazal

=== Single tracks ===
- 2000 – Atlantis World
- 2000 – Da Hip Hop Witch (soundtrack)
- 2006 – Lovin' Lola (Summer Hits 2006)
- 2009 – Diss Track feat. Truceklan

=== Collaborations ===
- 2000 – Flaminio Maphia feat. Duke Montana – Veteranos Por Vida
- 2000 – Flaminio Maphia feat. Duke Montana, Chef Ragoo, Piotta & Brusco – Combattimento Mortale III
- 2006 – Gel & Metal Carter feat. Duke Montana – Corpus Christii
- 2007 – Chicoria feat. Duke Montana – Combattemose Roma
- 2007 – Chicoria feat. Duke Montana – How We Livin'
- 2007 – Noyz Narcos feat. Duke Montana – Don't Fuck With Me
- 2007 – Noyz Narcos feat. Mystic1, Duke Montana & Miss Violetta Beauregarde – 666
- 2007 – Metal Carter feat. Duke Montana – Con Il Crack
- 2008 – Santo Trafficante feat. Inoki, Duke Montana – Split Personality
- 2008 – Lou Chano feat. Duke Montana & Noyz Narcos – The Gates of Hell
- 2008 – Gel feat. Mystic1, Duke Montana & Chicoria – True Stories
- 2008 – Duke Montana feat. Noyz Narcos – Bersaglio Accerchiato
- 2008 – Lou Chano feat. Cole, Fabri Fibra & Duke Montana – Deadicated
- 2008 – Rough feat. Duke Montana & Metal Carter – We Crave Hardcore Rap
- 2008 – Noyz Narcos & Dj Gengis Khan feat. Duke Montana – Keep Your Mouth Shut
- 2009 – Cole feat. Duke Montana & Chicoria – Groupie Love
- 2009 – Gast feat. Duke Montana – Everyday
- 2009 – Gast feat. Duke Montana & Noyz Narcos – Sideshow
- 2009 – Gast feat. Chicoria & Duke Montana – Runnin' This Rap Shit
- 2009 – Gast feat. Cole & Duke Montana – Baby
- 2010 – Noyz Narcos feat. Duke Montana – Sotto Indagine
- 2010 – Noyz Narcos feat. Duke Montana – Nel Teschio
- 2010 – Noyz Narcos feat. Duke Montana & Chicoria – L'ultima Chiamata
- 2010 – In The Panchine feat. Duke Montana & Noyz Narcos – Gatto Delle Nevi
- 2011 – Metal Carter & Cole feat. Gast & Duke Montana – Croce Nera Sulla Mappa
- 2011 – Guè Pequeno feat. Duke Montana & Noyz Narcos – Mind Your Bizness
- 2012 – Chicoria feat. Duke Montana – Lonely Streets
- 2012 – Chicoria feat. Duke Montana – Polvere Alla Polvere, Cenere Alla Cenere, Relativo Al Genere
