= El Presidente (musician) =

Esa aka El Presidente
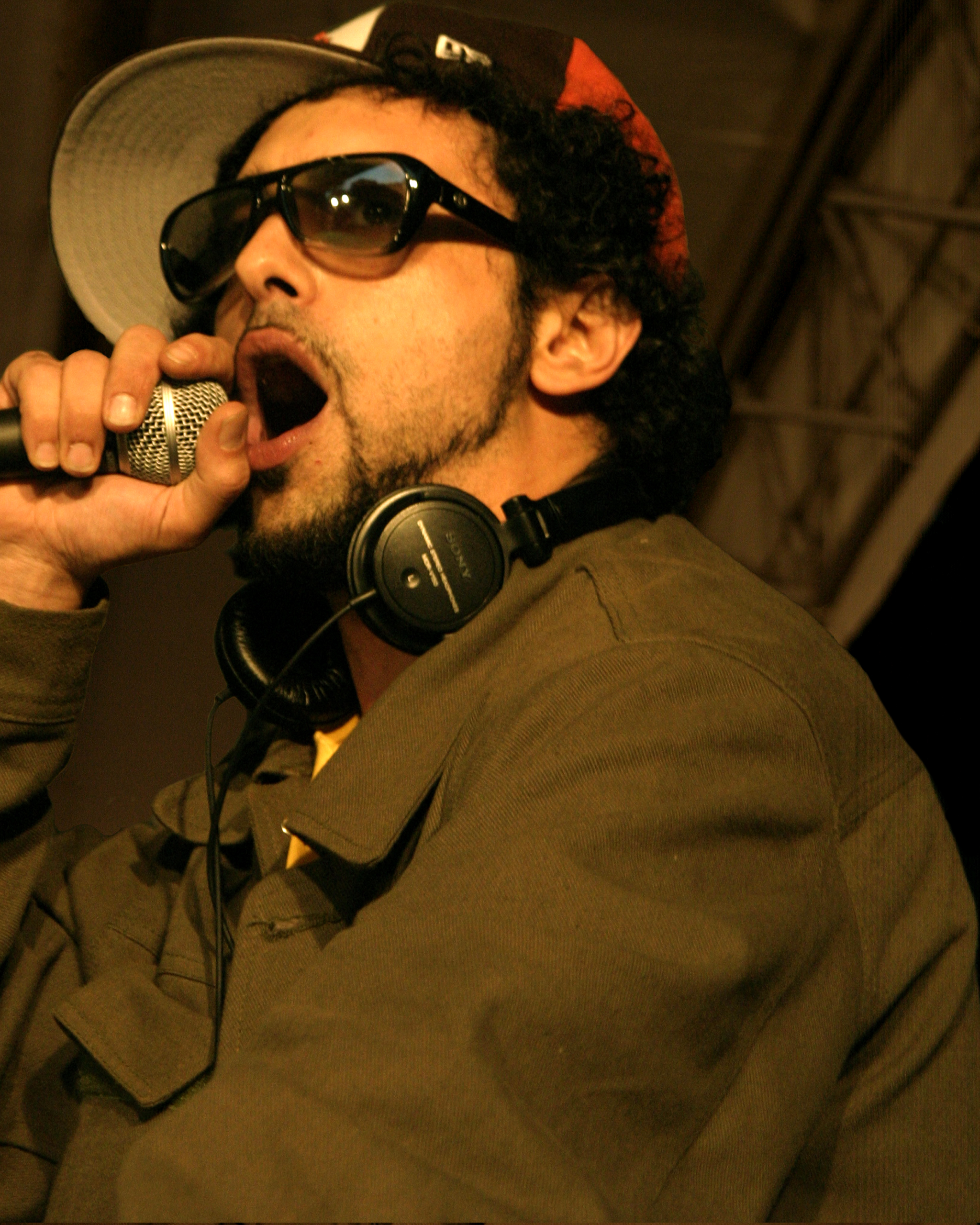
- in 2007

Background information
- Born: Francesco Cellamaro
- Origin: Reggio Calabria, Italy
- Genres: Hip-hop
- Occupations: Musician, singer, record producer
- Years active: 1991–present
- Label: Sony BMG
- Website: frankie.tv

Esa aka El Presidente, born Francesco Cellamaro (Reggio Calabria, 1 October 1972), is an Italian rapper and beatmaker of Calabrian origins. El Presidente has been active since the early stages of the Italian hip hop movement in the early 1990s, and predominantly discusses Politics and Society in his music.

== Biography ==
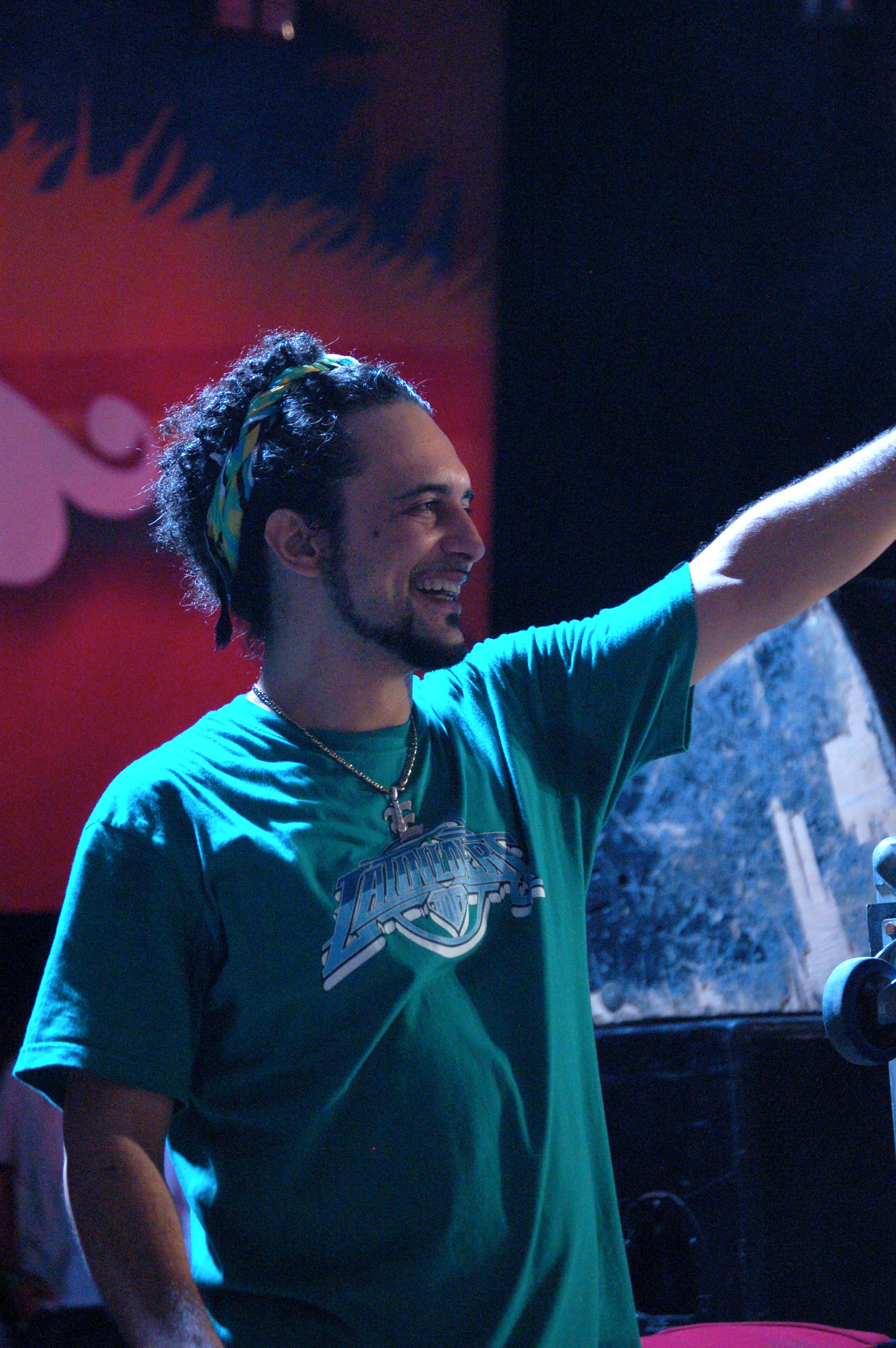
Esa in 2008

He is the brother of Tormento (in group Sottotono) and Marya, both became rappers. Francesco grew up musically listening to groups such as Eric B & Rakim, Run-DMC, Public Enemy and the Beastie Boys. In his teens he starts to attend hip hop circles, first as a breaker, and later approaching MCing.

In 1991 the collective Otierre (Originale Trasmissione del Ritmo) is founded, union of breakers, beatmakers, DJs and MCs, or representatives of each of the four core disciplines of hip hop. The roster consists of Azza, DJ Fede, DJ Irmu, DJ Nitro, DJ Vez, DJ Vigor, Esa, Intruso, Limite, Polare, Torrido, and later by The Female Mc La Pina.

In 1998 Esa and Polare change their names respectively to El Presidente and Polaroide founding the group Gente Guasta.

In 2002 he starts his first solo project Tutti Gli Uomini Del Presidente, self-produced and distributed by Vibrarecords.

In 2006 he released his second solo album Tu sei bravo on the label La Serra.

In 2008 he founded 'Siamesi Brothers' hence the name with his brother Tormento and released a self-titled LP.

== Discography ==
=== With Otierre (OTR) ===
- 1992 - l'anno della riscossa (demo) (1992)
- Ragga no droga (1992)
- Quel sapore particolare (1994)
- Dalla sede (1997)

=== With Gente Guasta ===
- La grande truffa del rap (2000)
- Quinto potere (2001)

=== With Siamesi Brothers ===
- Siamesi Brothers (2008)
- La macchina del funk (2010)

=== Solo ===
- 2002 – Tutti gli uomini del presidente
- 2006 – Tu sei bravo
- 2007 – Non mi spezzo
- 2008 – Il messaggio
- 2008 – KI.N.G. - Kids Never Grow Up
- 2009 – Hip Hop Musica
- 2011 – 100% di getto

=== Other collaborations ===
- Esa & Virtu-oso – Special Blend (2009/2010)

=== Other productions ===
- La Connessione - European Attack (1998)
- Street album (2004)
- Robe Grosse – Fish (2005)
- The Reverse-the reverse (2005)
- The Stuff(it's really fresh)-The Reverse (2005)
