= Club Dogo =

Italian hip hop group

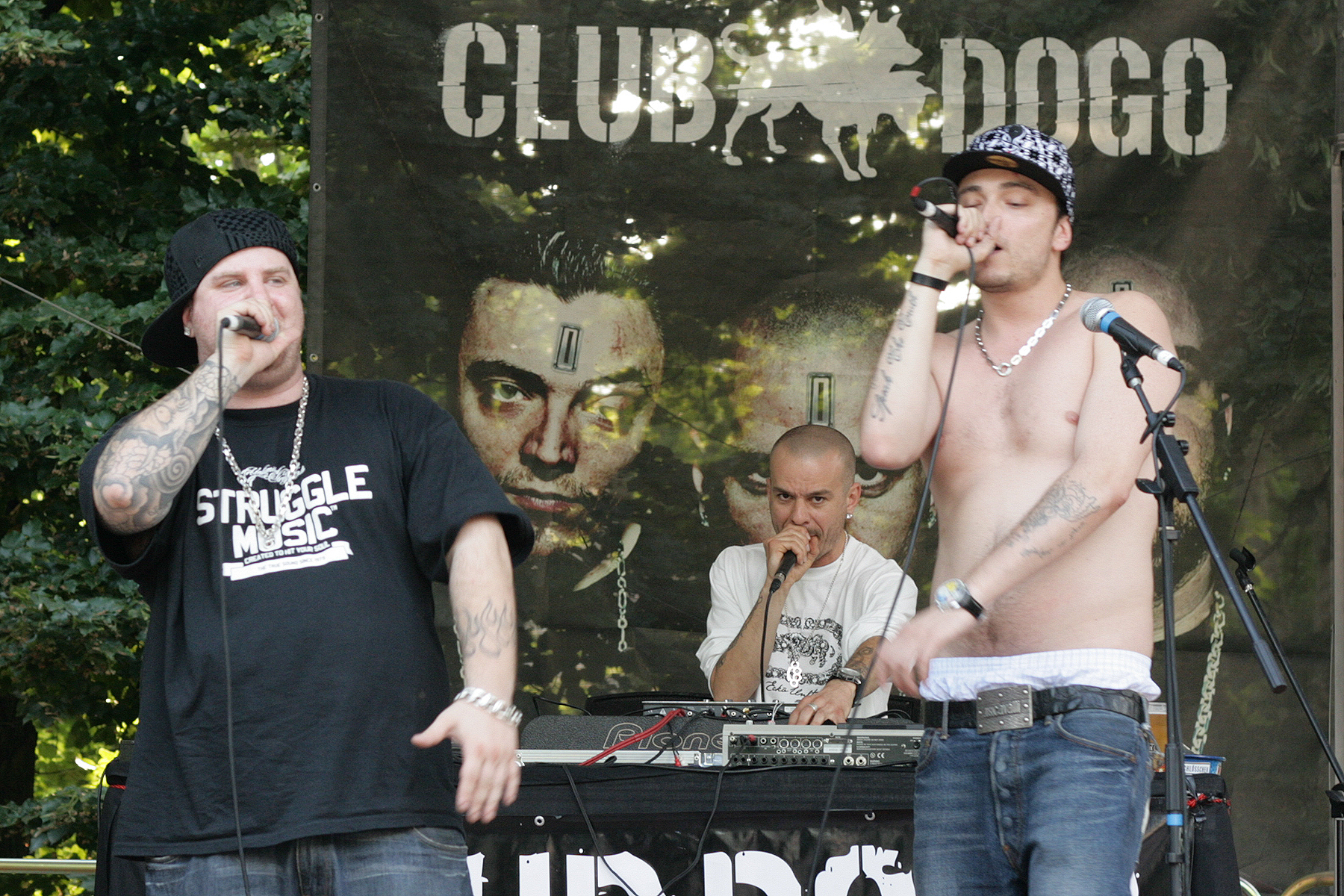

Background information
- Origin: Milan, Italy
- Genres: Italian hip hop; hardcore hip hop; mafioso rap; hip house
- Years active: 1999–2015, 2023–
- Label: Universal Records
- Members: Gué Pequeno; Jake La Furia; Don Joe
- Past members: Dargen D'Amico (Sacre Scuole)

Club Dogo is an Italian rap group from Milan that consists of Gué Pequeno, Jake La Furia and the beatmaker Don Joe.

The group grew out of the friendship between rappers Gué Pequeno (whose stage name was Lucky Luciano) and Dargen D'Amico in 1999. Originally the group's name was "Sacre Scuole" and its members were the two aforementioned rappers and Jake La Furia, whose stage name was originally Fame. In 2001, after their first and only CD (3 MC's al Cubo), the group was disbanded due to quarrels between Jake and Dargen.

In 2005, Club Dogo formed the crew named Dogo Gang, including other MCs and DJs from Milan that gradually joined the collective.

Club Dogo stopped producing music together in 2014, although none of the three members ever stated the group was officially disbanded. Club Dogo announced their return on stage as a group through a video published on their social media on 20 October 2023. The video featured Milan's mayor Giuseppe Sala.

== Career ==
=== 1999-2001: Sacre Scuole ===
The group was formed out of the friendship between Guè Pequeno and Dargen D'Amico, who were schoolmates and writing partners; they were later joined by the graffiti artist and MC Jake La Furia. The frontman is Dargen D'Amico, to whom the other two artists will always credit a certain influence on their early artistic development. The group collaborated with artists such as Solo Zippo, Chief, DJ Enzo, DJ Skizo, and DJ Zak (of the Alien Army), who were all well-established figures in the Italian underground hip-hop scene.

In 1999, the group released 3 MC's al cubo, an album for which Chief served as executive producer. Around the same time, Don Joe (an MC and producer who had worked alongside the R&B singer Irene Lamedica) began collaborating closely with the trio, producing one track on the album. The group disbanded in 2001 due to disagreements between Dargen D'Amico and Jake La Furia.

=== 2002-2006: Mi fist and Penna capitale ===
Following their time as Sacre Scuole, Jake La Furia and Guè teamed up with Don Joe to form a new group called Club Dogo. The name comes from the Argentine Dogo, a dog breed particularly suited for hunting. Their independent debut was Mi fist, an LP released in 2003 entirely through self-production. Don Joe handled the music production, with collaborations from Dargen D'Amico, Aken, and Issam Lamaislam, an MC from the Porzione Massiccia Crew in Bologna.

The success of Mi fist was so big that the album was reissued in 2004 by the Vibra Records label. Subsequently, the album and the group were honored at the 2004 MC Giaime awards, where they received the award for Best Album and Best Artist/Group. Also in 2004, the group released PMC VS Club Dogo-The Official Mixtape in collaboration with the Porzione Massiccia Crew.

In March 2006, following numerous live performances between 2004 and 2005, their second studio album, Penna capitale, was released. Production was once again handled by Don Joe, with contributions on some tracks from the Italian-Argentine artist Shablo, the Caribbean singer Ricardo Phillips, DJ Shocca, Deda (a member of Sangue Misto), MC Mars, Marracash, and Liv L'Raynge.

=== 2007-2008: Vile denaro and Virgin Records contract ===
On 18 May 2007, the album Vile denaro was released, preceded by the single "Mi hanno detto che...". The album was recorded in a high-quality recording studio and was mastered at Sterling Sound Studio in New York. This album gave the group newer and greater visibility, earning prominent coverage in hip-hop focused publications such as Groove Magazine, as well as in Rolling Stone, Rumore, and Corriere della Sera. Signing with a major record label effectively sparked yet another controversy over the "sellout" of Italian hip-hop artists and groups to record companies. Club Dogo achieved considerable success (debuting at No. 11 on the Italian charts) with an album clearly influenced by early 1990s dance music. Notable collaborations include Vincenzo da Via Anfossi and Marracash, who each contribute a verse to "Puro Bogotà."

The second single from Vile denaro is "Tornerò da re." The song's music video features Elena Grimaldi, a well-known Italian porn star, in two versions: a censored version of the video and an uncensored version with explicit content.

That same year, the pornographic film Mucchio selvaggio, directed by Matteo Swaitz and featuring Club Dogo, was released. In late 2007, the trio released the music video for "Puro bogotà," which they self-produced between Milan and Budapest, and it reached number one on the charts among the most-viewed Italian music videos on the web; they began to emerge as one of the most-viewed Italian bands on YouTube.

In early 2008, the group contributed to the compilation "Benvenuti nella giungla", which featured all members of the Dogo Gang, with productions by Don Joe and Deleterio.

=== 2009: Dogocrazia and the Universal Music contract ===
On 5 June 2009, Club Dogo released their fourth studio album Dogocrazia. It was released by Universal Music Italia. The album features fifteen tracks and several collaborations, both with Italian artists (J-Ax, Fabio "Terron" of Sud Sound System) and rappers from overseas, such as Kool G Rap.

The first single released was "Sgrilla", which sparked quite a bit of controversy, as the band once again raps in a very explicit manner. The music video for the song "Brucia ancora" was released, featuring rapper J-Ax, and finally the second single, "Boing" was released. The album in question features two remixes: one of "Amore infame," featuring Daniele Vit, and one of "Sgrilla," featuring Vacca, Noyz Narcos, Ntò, and Nex Cassel, which are not included on the original album but are available exclusively on iTunes.

With the release of this album, Club Dogo cemented their status as one of Italy's most popular hip-hop groups. Despite not receiving heavy airplay on radio or television, this album debuted at number seven on Italy's best-selling album chart and remained there for over three months. During their official tour, they presented the album at the Idroscalo in Milan in front of over 5,000 spectators and they toured Italy nonstop. They appeared in the October 2009 issue of the Italian edition of the monthly magazine Playboy.

In 2009, they also appeared in a commercial for Nike alongside soccer player Mario Balotelli. On 8 June 2010, "La legge del cane" (The Law of the Dog), a book written by Pequeno and La Furia, was published by Add editore. On 10 June 2010, the trio performed at the Wind Music Awards 2010, performing the single "Ubbidirò" alongside Biagio Antonacci. On 5 July 2010, the trio performed at the Heineken Jammin' Festival alongside Black Eyed Peas, Cypress Hill, N.E.R.D., and Massive Attack.

=== 2010-2012: Che bello essere noi and side projects ===
On 29 June 2010, the single "Per la gente" was released on their official website, serving as a preview of the group's fifth studio album Che bello essere noi. This album was released on October 5. The album was promoted and preceded by the single "Spacco tutto" and the music video for the song "Voi non siete come noi". After its release, the album debuted at number two on the Italian album chart, only being surpassed by Alessandra Amoroso. The album in question includes two remixes as bonus tracks: "Spacchiamo tutto remix", a remix of "Spacco tutto", featuring Entics, Ensi, Vacca, and Emis Killa, and the remix of "Per la gente" by Don Joe.

On 13 October 2010, Corriere della Sera devoted a full page to the album in its national edition. On October 15, La Furia and Pequeno appeared as guests on the show Le invasioni barbariche, broadcast live on LA7. They later appeared on the radio show Deejay chiama Italia on Radio Deejay and on television on the shows Colorado, Chiambretti Night on Mediaset, among others. In November 2010, they wrote and performed the theme song for Deejay TV based on the song "D.D.D."

In January 2011, they appeared in the Italian edition of the monthly magazine Playboy. Since March 2011, they were the stars of the television show Un giorno da cani on Deejay TV. The EP Un giorno da cani was born out of the work done for the program.

In late April 2011, the group's members embarked on a series of solo projects: Jake La Furia collaborated with Ensi and 2nd Roof Music to produce the single "100K", while Guè released his first solo album, titled Il ragazzo d'oro which featured collaborations with Italian hip-hop artists such as Caprice, Caneda, Duellz, Vincenzo da Via Anfossi, Vacca, Baby K, and Emis Killa.

On 14 June 2011, Don Joe and Shablo released Thori & Rocce, an album featuring a group of artists representing the entire Italian scene, including Club Dogo and several artists from the Dogo Gang, as well as Duellz, Fabri Fibra, DJ Shocca, Bassi Maestro, and others. The first single was "Le leggende non muoiono mai" featuring Noyz Narcos, Club Dogo, J-Ax, Marracash, and Fabri Fibra.

In July 2011, a video was released featuring their collaboration with Pino Scotto and their appearance on his show Database on Rock TV. In 2012, a new version of Thori & Rocce was released. It is an EP consisting of four remixes of tracks originally included on the album.

In 2012, Guè released the mixtape Fastlife Mixtape Vol. 3, which features collaborations with members of the Dogo Gang as well as artists outside the collective, such as Ensi, Zuli, Ntò, Fedez, and Emis Killa.

=== 2012-2013: Noi siamo il club and other projects ===
On 7 June 2012, the band released its sixth studio album, Noi siamo il club, preceded by three singles: "Cattivi esempi", released on April 24, "Chissenefrega (in discoteca)", released on May 6, and the song of the same name, "Noi siamo il club", released on May 22.

The group later appeared on Max Pezzali's album Hanno ucciso l'Uomo Ragno 2012, singing "Con un deca" in a feature with him. A few days later, additional music videos from "Noi siamo il club" were posted on Club Dogo's YouTube channel: "Erba del diavolo," "P.E.S." (on the radio since July 17), "Collassato," "Tutto ciò che ho" (released on radio as of October 15), and "Se tu fossi me" (released on the radio as of November 10). "Noi siamo il club" was certified gold for selling over 30,000 copies, while the single ''P.E.S.'' was certified double platinum for selling over 60,000 copies; In March 2013, the album was certified platinum for over 60,000 copies sold. During the same period, they appeared as guests on the talent show Amici di Maria De Filippi alongside Fabri Fibra, Nesli, and Emis Killa. On 3 April 2013, their YouTube channel was shut down due to "repeated or serious violations of YouTube's policy prohibiting content designed to harass, bully, or threaten." The channel was then reinstated a few days later.

On 5 April 2013, Guè released a single "Business" on iTunes from his second solo album titled Bravo ragazzo. At the 2013 MTV Italia Awards, they were nominated within the "Best Band" category. On June 14, the music video for another track from Noi siamo il club—namely, "Sangue blu"—featuring J-Ax, was released. On October 29, Jake La Furia's first solo album Musica commerciale was released.

=== 2014-2017: Non siamo più quelli di Mi fist and hiatus ===
On 22 May 2014, Club Dogo posted a trailer for the sequel to "Noi siamo il club" on their YouTube channel. On May 28, the single "Weekend" was announced. It was released digitally on June 2. Produced by Don Joe, the single precedes the release of the group's seventh studio album, scheduled for September.

On 11 July 2014, the band announced the album Non siamo più quelli di Mi fist and its release date, set for 9 September 2014. On July 22, the second single of the album "Fragili" was announced; it was produced in collaboration with the Italian singer Arisa and released on July 25. On the July 28, the album's track list was revealed. On August 29, a trailer for the music video for the song "Sayonara" was released; the song was produced in collaboration with Lele Spedicato of Negramaro and made available for digital download starting September 2.

The album was certified gold in Italy in late October 2014 for reaching 25,000 copies sold. It was also promoted by two other singles: Sai zio, released on November 7, and "Start It Over", a duet with Cris Cab that began airing on the radio on 27 March 2015. On this last date, Club Dogo announced a reissue of the album consisting of three CDs and a DVD, titled Non siamo più quelli di Mi fist - The Complete Edition, scheduled for release on May 5, 2015.

On 27 January 2015, J-Ax's fifth studio album Il bello d'esser brutti was released, featuring a duet with Club Dogo on the track "Old Skull", among other duets. On 5 May 2015, Don Joe's album Ora o mai più was released, featuring the track "Status Symbol", recorded with the other members of Club Dogo.

On 19 May 2017, Vile denaro 10th Anniversary was released, a special edition celebrating the tenth anniversary of the 2007 album Vile denaro with remastered tracks and remixes. On June 27, while promoting his solo album Gentleman, Guè stated in an interview with the Swiss publication Ticinonline that a Club Dogo reunion is unlikely at this time, as all the artists are satisfied with their solo careers.

=== 2023-present: The return of Club Dogo ===
On 20 October 2023, the trio announced their return to the music scene by posting a short video on their official social media. In the days that followed this announcement, the band announced ten concert dates which were sold out immediately; these concerts were set for Mediolanum Forum in Assago in the spring of 2024. Meanwhile, on 14 December 2023, they announced the release of their self-titled album. The album was released on 12 January 2024. On the day of the album’s release, a concert date at the San Siro Stadium in Milan was also announced, scheduled for 28 June 2024.

== Formation ==
- Guè – voice
- Jake La Furia – voice
- Don Joe – producer, voice

== Filmography ==
=== Movies ===
- Mucchio selvaggio, directed by Matteo Swaitz (2007)
- 5 Euro, directed by Tekla Taidelli (2008)
- I 2 soliti idioti, directed by Enrico Lando (2012)

=== Television ===
- Club privè - Ti presento i Dogo – documentary (2012)

== Discography ==
=== Albums ===
As Sacre Scuole

Year	Album
1999	3 MC's al cubo

As Club Dogo

Year	Album	Peak positions		Certification
Year	Album	ITA	SWI	Certification
2003	Mi Fist	—	—	
2006	Penna capitale	92	—	
2007	Vile denaro	11	—	
2009	Dogocrazia	7	—	FIMI: Gold
2010	Che bello essere noi	2	—	FIMI: Gold
2012	Noi siamo il club	1	—	FIMI: Platinum
2014	Non siamo più quelli di Mi Fist	1	27	FIMI: Gold
2024	Club Dogo	1	3	

As Dogo Gang

Year	Album
2004	PMC VS Club Dogo: The Official Mixtape
2008	Benvenuti nella Giungla

=== Singles ===
Year	Title	Peak positions	Album
Year	Title	ITA	Album
2012	"Se il mondo fosse" (with Emis Killa, J-Ax & Marracash)	2	
2012	"P.E.S." (feat. Giuliano Palma)	3	Noi siamo il club
2014	"Weekend"	1	Non siamo più quelli di mi fist
2014	"Fragili" (feat. Arisa)	1	Non siamo più quelli di mi fist
2014	"Sayonara" (feat. Lele Spedicato "Negramaro")	16	Non siamo più quelli di mi fist
2024	"Nato per questo" (with Marracash)	1	Club Dogo
2024	"Soli a Milano" (with Elodie)	7	Club Dogo

=== Other projects ===
- 2005: Don Joe & Grand Agent – Regular (EP)
- 2005: Guè Pequeno & Deleterio – Hashishinz Sound Vol. 1 (EP)
- 2005: Marracash & Dogo Gang – Roccia Music Vol. 1 (mixtape)
- 2006: DJ Harsh & Guè Pequeno – Fast Life Vol. 1 (mixtape)
- 2009: DJ Harsh & Guè Pequeno – Fast Life Vol. 2 (mixtape)
- 2012: DJ Harsh & Guè Pequeno – Fast Life Vol. 3 (mixtape)
- 2011: Don Joe & Shablo – Thori & Rocce
- 2011: Guè Pequeno – Il Ragazzo d'Oro
- 2013: Guè Pequeno – Bravo Ragazzo
- 2013: Jake La Furia – Musica Commerciale
- 2015: Guè Pequeno – Vero
- 2016: Jake La Furia – Fuori Da Qui
- 2017: Gué Pequeno – Gentleman
- 2018: Gué Pequeno – Sinatra
- 2019: Gué Pequeno – Gelida Estate (EP)
- 2020: Gué Pequeno – Mr. Fini
- 2020: with Emis Killa – 17 (Album)
- 2021: Gué Pequeno – Fast Life Vol.4
- 2022: Gué Pequeno – GVESVS
- 2022: Jake La Furia – Ferro del mestiere
- 2023: Gué – Madreperla

== See also ==
- Italian hip hop
