= Jake La Furia =

Italian rapper (born 1979)

- Jake La Furia in 2026

Background information
- Born: Francesco Vigorelli; 25 February 1979 (age 47); Milan, Italy
- Genres: Hip hop; gangsta rap
- Occupation: Rapper
- Website: www.thereallafuria.com

Francesco Vigorelli (born 25 February 1979), known professionally as Jake La Furia, is an Italian rapper. He is also a member of the hip hop group Club Dogo with fellow rapper Guè and producer Don Joe. He was also in "Sacre Scuole", a group formed by him, Guè, and Dargen D'Amico.

== Biography ==
=== Sacre Scuole ===
He is the son of Giampietro Vigorelli, a well-known artistic advertising director of the agency D'Adda Lorenzini Vigorelli BBDO. Vigorelli came into contact with Hip hop through Graffiti, which he started practicing around 1993. His first nickname was Fame, originating from his tag (graffiti signature). A little later he started rapping, becoming one of the best known MCs in the Milan area. Together with his companions Gué Pequeno and Dargen D'Amico he formed the Sacre Scuole, participating in albums and mixtapes by artists such as Chief, Solo Zippo, ATPC and Prodigio.

In 1999 they released their first album, 3 MC's al cubo ("3 Mcs Cubed"), whose executive producer is Chief. In 2001 arguments between him and D'Amico led to the dissolution of the group: Jake and Gué formed together with Don Joe (with whom they had already collaborated for their first album) the Club Dogo while D'Amico undertook a solo career. However, the two would later make peace and D'Amico would collaborate on a track of Club Dogo's first album.

=== Club Dogo ===
In the new group, Vigorelli changed his stage name from Fame to Jake La Furia, in tribute to the character Jake 'the Muss' Heke from the movie Once Were Warriors, which translates to "Jake La Furia" in the Italian version. The first album of the group, Mi fist, was released in 2003. The album was named best rap record at MC Giaime in 2004. In 2006 their second album, Penna capitale ("Capital Pen"), was released, while in 2007 they released their third album, Vile denaro ("Base Money"), their first with a major label, EMI. After this album their talent began to be recognized also by other majors: this led them to sign a contract with Universal. The first record to come out under this label was Dogocrazia ("Dogo cracy"), which contains many collaborations with other artists of the Italian hip hop scene and two with the US artists Kool G Rap and Infamous Mobb.

On 29 June 2010, the single "Per la gente" ("For the People") was released on their official website, which anticipated the release of the album Che bello essere noi ("Nice to be us"), on 5 October. The album was also promoted by singles "Spacco tutto" ("Breaking everything") and "DDD". The album debuted at the second position of the Italian album chart. Noi siamo il club ("We are the Club"), the sixth album by Dogo, anticipated by the single "Cattivi esempi" ("Bad Examples") released on 24 April, was released on 5 June 2012. The group later collaborated on the 2012 album Hanno ucciso l'Uomo Ragno 2012 by Max Pezzali, singing on the track "Con un deca", while in 2014 they released their seventh studio album Non siamo più quelli di Mi fist ("We aren't those of Mi fist anymore").

=== Solo career ===
In October 2012, in an interview with Italian magazine Panorama, Jake La Furia announced that he had started working on his solo album. On 10 September 2013, the video clip to the song "Musica commerciale" (lit. "Commercial Music") was published on YouTube, while the opening track of the album of the same name was released on 29 October of the same year. Ten days later, the single "Inno Nazionale" ("National Anthem") was released on the iTunes Store, peaking at number 14 on the Italian singles chart. Musica commerciale debuted at the second position of the Italian album chart and, in May 2014, it was certified gold for having reached the threshold of 25,000 copies sold. The album's track "Esercizio di stile" ("Exercise in Style") debuted at number 92 of the Italian singles chart.

On 7 March 2016, the rapper announced the release of the single "El Chapo", released the following day for digital download. On the 18th of the same month a further single was released, entitled "Testa o croce" ("Heads or Tails") and recorded in duet with Egreen, while at the end of the month his second studio album Fuori da qui ("Out of Here") was announced. It was released on 22 April and promoted by the single of the same name. The latter is a duet with Luca Carboni. The singles "Me gusta" (in collaboration with Alessio La Profunda Melodia) and "Non so dire no" ("I Can't Say No") were subsequently extracted from the disc. They were released respectively on 20 May and 7 October.

Since February 2017, Jake La Furia has started the activity of radio host with the program Jake Hit Up, broadcast on Radio 105. In the same year he collaborated again with Alessio La Profunda Melodia on the single "El party", released on 9 June for digital download; it was subsequently certified quadruple platinum for selling over 200,000 copies. On 23 February 2018, the single "MMMH", produced by Big Fish, was released. During that year he collaborated as a guest artist on singles "Barracuda" by Boomdabash and "Amore zen" by Le Vibrazioni. On 29 June 2018, the single "Bandita" was released. He collaborated with Don Jon on the single "F.A.K.E.". The following 28 June he released the single "6 del mattino" ("6 am"), made in collaboration with Brancar from Il Pagante. He collaborated with Big Fish on the single "Soldi dal'inferno" ("Money from Hell"), which was released on 10 June 2020.

On 17 July 2020, he announced the release of the album 17 in collaboration with Emis Killa, which was promoted by the single "Malandrino" ("Rascal").

On 26 August 2022, the single "Senza niente da dire", in collaboration with Ana Mena and taken from the rapper's third studio album, was released.

Since 2024, he has been a mentor on X Factor Italy.
