= Willie Peyote =

Italian rapper and singer-songwriter (born 1985)

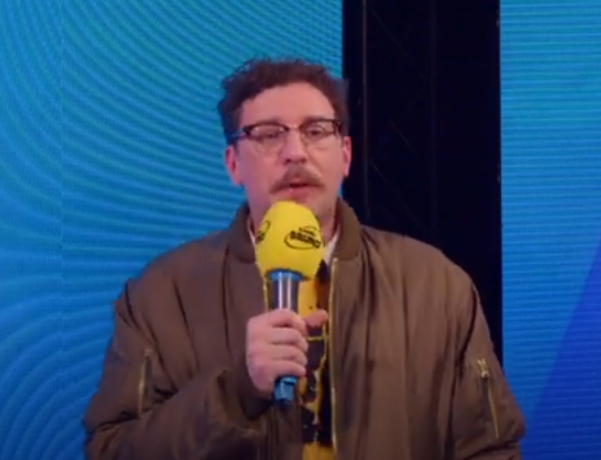
- Willie Peyote in February 2025

Background information
- Born: Guglielmo Bruno; 28 August 1985 (age 40); Turin, Piedmont, Italy
- Genres: Alternative hip hop
- Occupations: Rapper; singer; songwriter
- Years active: 2004–present
- Label: Virgin Records

Guglielmo Bruno (born 28 August 1985), known professionally as Willie Peyote, is an Italian rapper and singer-songwriter. His stage name is a pun on the cartoon character Wile E. Coyote and the entheogenic cactus peyote, along with the English version of his name Guglielmo.

Peyote participated at the Sanremo Music Festival 2021 with the song "Mai dire mai (La locura)", winning the Mia Martini critics award, finishing sixth place. In December 2024, he was announced as one of the participants in the Sanremo Music Festival 2025. He placed 16th with the song "Grazie ma no grazie".

== Biography ==
Born Guglielmo Bruno, his father from Turin and mother from Biella were both musicians. He graduated in political science.

== Musical career ==
=== 2011–2014: First releases ===
Between 2011 and 2012, Peyote released a trilogy of EPs on SoundCloud titled Manuale del giovane nichilista (lit. 'Manual for a Young Nihilist'). On 10 December 2013, he released his first studio album, Non è il mio genere, il genere umano (lit. 'Humankind is Not My Kind'), for free download online. The album was later re-released in a physical CD format the following 24 June.

His second album, Educazione sabauda (lit. 'Savoy Education'), was released in 2015, to positive critical response. The album contains a number of references to important names in hip hop, rock, and songwriting, including Cypress Hill, The Clash, and Francesco Guccini. On 23 April 2017, he performed on the show Che tempo che fa and the song Io non sono razzista ma... (lit. 'I'm not racist, but...') provoked criticism from journalist Maurizio Belpietro who wrote in the newspaper La Verità that Willie Peyote had accused the whole nation of xenophobia.

=== 2019–2024: Iodegradabile and Pornostalgia ===
On 30 August 2019, Peyote signed a record contract with Virgin Records, releasing the single "La tua futura ex moglie" (lit. 'Your Future Ex-wife') ahead of his fourth album. The album, titled Iodegradabile, was released on 25 October, along with the second single, "Mango". Peyote took part in Sanremo Music Festival 2021, with the song "Mai dire mai (La locura)" (lit. 'Never say never (Madness)'), finishing in sixth place and winning the Mia Martini prize.

On 8 April 2022, Peyote returned with the single "Fare schifo", with the comedian Michela Giraud, with whom he also collaborated on his following single "La colpa al vento", which came out on 22 April 2022. The album Pornostalgia was released on 6 May 2022. In 2023, he released two standalone singles: "Picasso" on 16 May, and "Frecciarossa" on 15 September.

=== 2024–present: Sulla riva del fiume ===
On 25 April 2024, Peyote released the single "Giorgia nel paese che si meraviglia" (lit. 'Giorgia in the Marvelous Country'), a song critical of Giorgia Meloni ahead of the Italian Liberation Day. The next day, the EP Sulla riva del fiume (lit. 'On the Riverbank') was released. In February 2025, Peyote competed for the second time in Sanremo Music Festival with the song "Grazie ma no grazie", finishing in sixteenth place. After the festival, he re-released Sulla riva del fiume with four new songs.

== Discography ==
=== Studio albums ===
- Manuale del giovane nichilista (2011)
- Non è il mio genere, il genere umano (2013)
- Educazione sabauda (2015)
- Sindrome di Tôret (2017) – No. 8 Italy
- Iodegradabile (2019) – No. 5 Italy
- Pornostalgia (2022) – No. 5 Italy

=== Live albums ===
- Ostensione della sindrome – Ultima cena (2019)

=== Singles and EPs ===
- L'efetto sbagliato (2018)
- La tua futura ex moglie (2019)
- Mango (2019)
- Algoritmo (featuring Shaggy, Don Joe) (2020)
- La depressione è un periodo dell'anno (2020)
- Mai dire mai (La locura) (2021) – No. 8 Italy
- Fare schifo (featuring Michela Giraud) (2022)
- La colpa al vento (2022)
- Picasso (2023)
- Frecciarossa (2023)
- Giorgia nel Paese che si meraviglia (2024)
- Sulla riva del fiume (2024)
- Grazie ma no grazie (2025)
