= Guè =

Italian rapper (born 1980)

Gué Pequeno
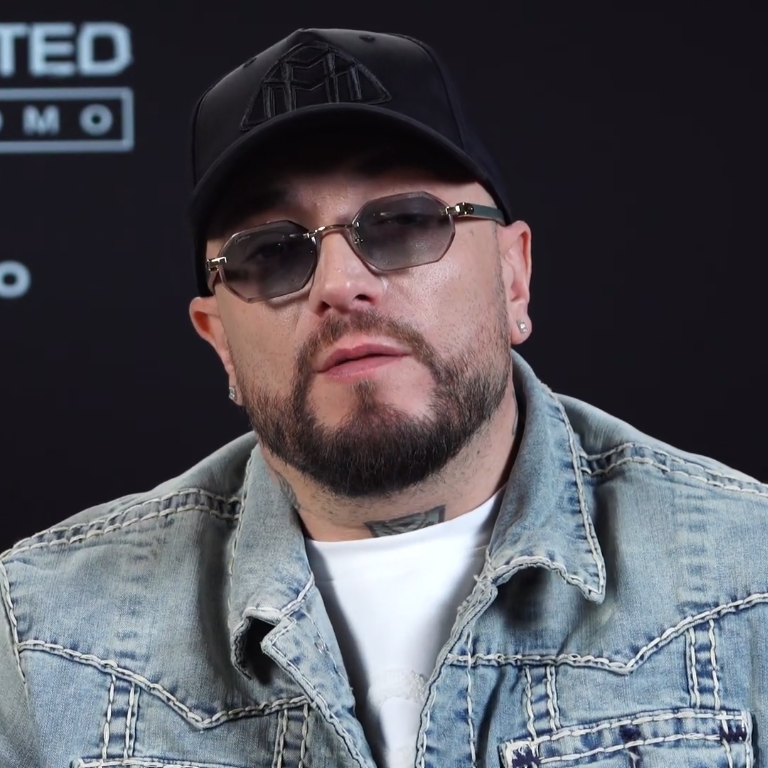
- Gué in 2024

Background information
- Born: Cosimo Fini; 25 December 1980 (age 45); Milan, Italy
- Genres: Hip hop; gangsta rap
- Occupations: Rapper; songwriter; record producer
- Labels: Vibrarecords (2004–2006); EMI (2006–2007); Virgin Records (2007–2008); Universal Music (2009–); Tanta Roba (2011–); Def Jam (2015–)
- Website: www.guepequeno.it

Cosimo Fini (born 25 December 1980), known professionally as Guè (Italian: [ˈɡwɛ]), previously as Gué Pequeno, is an Italian rapper. He is also a member of the famous hip hop group Club Dogo with rapper Jake La Furia and producer Don Joe. Between 1999 and 2001, he was also in "Sacre Scuole", a group made up by Gué Pequeno, Dargen D'Amico and Jake La Furia. In his career he collaborated with international artists such as Benny the Butcher, Kool G Rap, Akon, Rick Ross and Jadakiss.

== Solo career ==
=== Il ragazzo d'oro and Bravo ragazzo (2010–2014) ===
In June 2011, his first solo album was released, entitled Il ragazzo d'oro (The Golden Boy), which had the participation of several Italian rappers, including Marracash, Entics, Ensi and Jake La Furia. The disc was anticipated by the singles "Non lo spegnere" (Do not turn it off) and subsequently the video clip for the song "Ultimi Giorni" (Last days).

Also in 2011, the rapper together with DJ Harsh founded the independent record label "Tanta Roba", whose first product was Il mio primo disco da venduto (My first sellout record), by Fedez. Fastlife Mixtape Vol. 3 was also released on 20 January 2012, the result of collaboration with DJ Harsh and other Italian artists of the genre such as the aforementioned Fedez, Emis Killa, Salmo, Gemitaiz and Daniele Vit.

On 28 March 2013, the mixtape Guengsta Rap was released for free download from its official website. The tracks on the album are mixed by DJ Jay-K. On April 5 Gué releases "Business", which is the first single from the second studio album and produced by 2nd Roof. Its video clip is anticipated by a teaser in which it's found out the release date, set for June 4., instead it is published on April 9. Subsequently, the second single "Rose Nere" (Black Roses) is announced, released on iTunes on April 23; instead, the video clip was published on YouTube on April 26, the date on which the album title, Bravo ragazzo (Good Boy), was revealed. On 9 May he announced the track list of the album through his Facebook page, while the following day he released the third single extracted from the album, named "Bravo ragazzo" like the album itself. On June 13, Gué released a preview of the video clip of the song "Il drink & la jolla", made with the participation of 'Ntò and British singer Arlissa. The video was published two days later. On September 12 the video clip of the song Brivido was announced, made together with Marracash and published on September 17. In June 2014, Bravo ragazzo was certified platinum for the average 50,000 copies sold.

=== Vero (2015) ===
In spring 2015 Pequeno renewed his contract with Universal Music Group and signed the signature for Def Jam Recordings, thus becoming the first Italian artist to sign for the label. Following this, the rapper released the video clip of an unreleased track, named "Squalo". The latter, together with the singles "Le bimbe piangono" and "Interstellar", anticipated the release of the rapper's third solo album, entitled True and released on June 23 of the same year.

=== Collaboration with Marracash (2016–2017) ===
On 4 January 2016, through social networks, the rapper announced the creation of an album in the studio together with Marracash. Released on June 24 of the same year, the album is titled Santeria and consists of fifteen tracks, including the single forerunner "Nulla Accade", released on June 7.

=== Gentleman and Sinatra (2017–2020) ===
On 21 April 2017, Gué Pequeno published the single "Trinità" for digital download and streaming, promoted by the related video clip directed by Igor Grbesic and Marc Lucas. To follow was the double single "Non ci tu tu" / "T'apposto", released on June 2 of the same year.

On June 6, the rapper officially announced the fourth solo album Gentleman, released in the same month and composed of several songs in collaboration with various artists, including Sfera Ebbasta and Marracash. On 1 August 2018 he officially announced his entry into the Billion Headz Music Group, a label founded by Sfera Ebbasta and Charlie Charles. On the 24th of the same month, he announced the release of its fifth solo album Sinatra through its official social networks, which took place on the following 14 September and anticipated by the single "Trap Phone". The album was later also promoted by the subsequent single "Bling Bling" (Gold) and "2%", both of moderate commercial success.

=== Mr. Fini and Fastlife 4 (2020–2021) ===
On 14 June 2020 Gué Pequeno announced the sixth album Mr. Fini, which he defined as his "colossal" and he then released on the 26th of the same month. The singles Saigon and Chico were drawn from it, the latter of which reached the fifth position of the Top Singles. Subsequently, it was extracted as a single even 25 hours, for the occasion in a remixed version by Shablo and which saw the vocal participation of Ernia. In the same year he collaborated with Anna on the release of the single Bla Bla, released in October. In December 2020 the rapper released the unreleased Freestyle Fast Life, produced by DJ Harsh.

On 26 March 2021, the rapper re-released his debut album The Golden Boy on the occasion of the tenth anniversary of its release. In addition to the songs from the original edition, present here in a remastered version, there are also unreleased remixes made by various artists belonging to the Italian hip hop scene such as Charlie Charles, Gemitaiz and Lazza. Fastlife 4 mixtape would be released on 9 April 2021, continuing the mixtape series started in 2006 with DJ Harsh.

=== Name change from "Gué Pequeno" to "Gué" and GVESVS (2021–2022) ===
On 14 November 2021, the Italian rapper revealed the change of pseudonym from Gué Pequeno to Gué, as «Sono diventato abbastanza grande, posso togliere Pequeno dal mio nome» ("I am old enough, I can remove Pequeno from my name." He then announced his seventh album (Guesus, sometimes stylized as GVESVS) in the following weeks.

On 10 December 2021 GVESVS was published, with international featurings featuring Rick Ross and Jadakiss.

=== Madreperla (2023) ===
On 13 January 2023, Madreperla was released, an album entirely produced by the Italian producer Bassi Maestro.

=== Tropico del Capricorno (2024–present) ===
In December 2024, Guè was announced as one of the featured artists in Shablo's entry for the Sanremo Music Festival 2025 with the song "La mia parola". They placed 18th in the contest.

Guè's tenth album, Tropico del Capricorno, was released on 10 January 2025. It was promoted by the singles "Oh mamma mia" and "Meravigliosa". In 2026, he released his fifth mixtape "Fast Life 5: Audio Luxury", entirely produced by Cooking Soul, featuring some international artists such as Freddie Gibbs, Larry June and Cypress Hill's founder B-Real, but also a lot of Italian well-known and emerging artists, focusing on sound quality, with references to genres such as Jazz Rap and Neo-Soul.

== Discography ==
Studio albums

- Il ragazzo d'oro (2011)
- Bravo ragazzo (2013)
- Vero (2015)
- Santeria with Marracash (2016)
- Gentleman (2017)
- Sinatra (2018)
- Mr. Fini (2020)
- Guesus (2021)
- Madreperla (2023)
- Tropico del Capricorno (2025)
- KG with Rasty Kilo (2025)

== Filmography ==
=== Film ===
Year	Title	Role(s)	Notes
2007	Mucchio selvaggio	Member of Rappers Gang	Pornographic film
2012	I 2 soliti idioti	Himself	Cameo
2014	Step Up: All In	Jasper Tarik	Italian voice
2015	All Night Long	Mr. Esposito	
2015	Natale col Boss	Himself	Cameo
2019	Cetto c'è, senzadubbiamente	Himself	Cameo
2022	Autumn Beat	Himself	
2024	I soliti idioti 3 - Il ritorno	Zarro	
2025	La grazia	Himself	Cameo

=== Television ===
Year	Title	Role(s)	Notes
2015	Street Opera	Himself	Special
2016	Emigratis	Himself / Guest	2 episodes
2018	Inspector Coliandro	Drug dealer	Episode: "Vai col liscio"
2018	Sinatra: The Series	Himself	Docuseries
2019	The Voice of Italy	Himself / Coach	Season 6
2021	Stile originale	Himself	Special
2024	Celebrity Hunted: Caccia all'uomo	Himself / Contestant	Season 4
2025	Sanremo Music Festival 2025	Himself / Contestant	Performing "La mia parola" (18th place)
