= Irama discography =

Discography of Italian singer-songwriter and rapper Irama

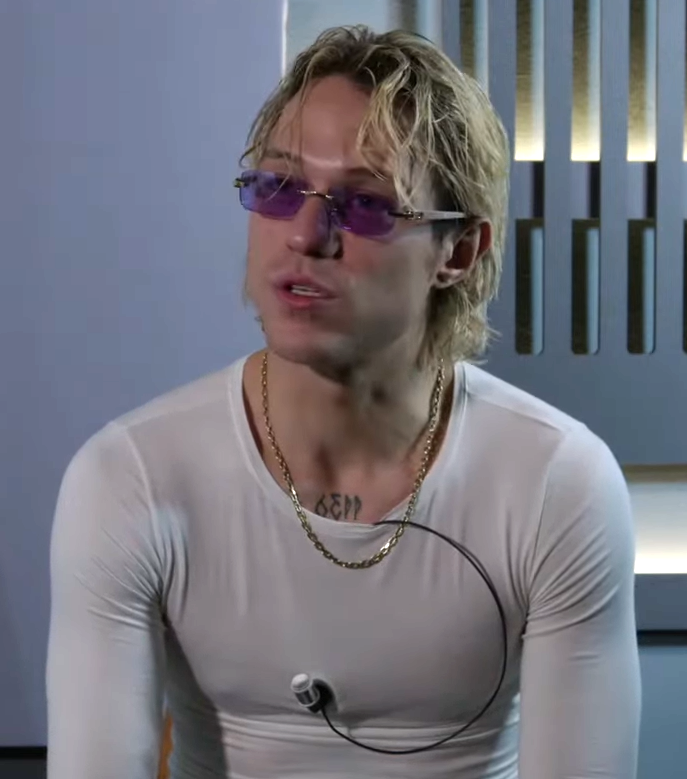
- Irama interviewed in February 2024
- Studio albums: 5
- EPs: 2
- Singles: 31

The discography of Italian singer-songwriter and rapper Irama consists of five studio albums, two EP and thirty-one singles.

== Studio albums ==
List of albums, with selected chart positions and certifications
Title	Album details	Peak chart positions		Certifications
Title	Album details	ITA	SWI	Certifications
Irama	Released: 12 February 2016; Label: Warner Music Italy; Formats: CD, digital download, streaming	41	—	
Giovani	Released: 19 October 2018; Label: Warner Music Italy; Formats: CD, digital download, streaming	1	88	FIMI: 2× Platinum
Il giorno in cui ho smesso di pensare	Released: 25 February 2022; Label: Warner Music Italy; Formats: CD, LP, digital download, streaming	1	19	FIMI: 4× Platinum
No Stress (with Rkomi)	Released: 7 July 2023; Label: Warner Music Italy, Island; Formats: CD, LP, digital download, streaming	2	—	FIMI: Platinum
Antologia della vita e della morte	Released: 17 October 2025; Label: Warner Music Italy; Formats: CD, LP, digital download, streaming	1	39	FIMI: Platinum
"—" denotes an album that did not chart.

== Extended plays ==
List of extended plays, with selected chart positions and certifications
Title	EP details	Peak chart positions		Certifications
Title	EP details	ITA	SWI	Certifications
Plume	Released: 1 July 2018; Label: Warner Music Italy; Formats: CD, digital download	1	20	FIMI: 3× Platinum
Crepe	Released: 28 August 2020; Label: Warner Music Italy; Formats: CD, digital download	1	—	FIMI: 2x Platinum
"—" denotes an EP that did not chart.

== Singles ==
=== As lead artist ===
Title	Year	Peak chart positions		Certifications	Album or EP
Title	Year	ITA	SWI	Certifications	Album or EP
"Cosa resterà"	2015	100	—		Irama
"Tornerai da me"	2016	—	—	FIMI: Gold	Irama
"Non ho fatto l'università"	2016	—	—		Irama
"Mi drogherò"	2017	—	—		Non-album single
"Un giorno in più"	2018	24	—	FIMI: Gold	Plume
"Nera"	2018	2	—	FIMI: 4× Platinum	Plume
"Bella e rovinata"	2018	21	—	FIMI: Platinum	Giovani
"La ragazza con il cuore di latta"	2019	3	58	FIMI: 2× Platinum	Giovani
"Arrogante"	2019	9	—	FIMI: 3× Platinum	Crepe
"Milano" (with Francesco Sarcina)	2020	—	—		Non-album single
"Mediterranea"	2020	1	92	FIMI: 5× Platinum	Crepe
"Crepe"	2020	18	—	FIMI: 2× Platinum	Crepe
"Ragazzi della nebbia" (with Mace and FSK Satellite)	2020	54	—		OBE
"La genesi del tuo colore"	2021	3	75	FIMI: 3× Platinum	Non-album singles
"Melodia proibita"	2021	19	—	FIMI: 2× Platinum	Non-album singles
"Luna piena" (with Rkomi and Shablo)	2021	12	—	FIMI: 5× Platinum	Taxi Driver
"Ovunque sarai"	2022	2	11	FIMI: 4× Platinum	Il giorno in cui ho smesso di pensare
"5 gocce" (with Rkomi)	2022	3	—	FIMI: 5× Platinum	Il giorno in cui ho smesso di pensare
"PamPamPamPamPamPamPamPam"	2022	16	—	FIMI: Platinum	Il giorno in cui ho smesso di pensare
"Ali"	2022	15	—	FIMI: Platinum	Il giorno in cui ho smesso di pensare
"Hollywood" (with Rkomi featuring Shablo)	2023	17	—	FIMI: 2× Platinum	No Stress
"Sulla pelle" (with Rkomi)	2023	—	—		No Stress
"Tu no"	2024	5	16	FIMI: 2× Platinum	Antologia della vita e della morte
"Galassie"	2024	21	—	FIMI: Platinum	Antologia della vita e della morte
"Lentamente"	2025	12	57	FIMI: Gold	Antologia della vita e della morte
"Ex" (featuring Elodie)	2025	11	—	FIMI: Gold	Antologia della vita e della morte
"Senz'anima"	2025	59	—		Antologia della vita e della morte
"Tutto tranne questo"	2026	34	—		Antologia della vita e della morte
"Cabana"	2026	21	—	FIMI: Gold	Antologia della vita e della morte
"—" denotes singles that did not chart or were not released.

=== As featured artist ===
List of singles
Title	Year
"È andata così" (Valerio Sgargi featuring Irama)	2014

== Other charted songs ==
List of album tracks, with chart positions, album name and certifications
Title	Year	Peak chart positions	Certifications	Album or EP
Title	Year	ITA	Certifications	Album or EP
"Che ne sai"	2018	45		Plume
"Che vuoi che sia"	2018	53		Plume
"Voglio solo te"	2018	42	FIMI: Gold	Plume
"Un respiro"	2018	71		Plume
"Una lacrima" (featuring Sfera Ebbasta)	2022	24	FIMI: Platinum	Il giorno in cui ho smesso di pensare
"Colpiscimi" (featuring Lazza)	2022	55		Il giorno in cui ho smesso di pensare
"Iride" (featuring Guè)	2022	81		Il giorno in cui ho smesso di pensare
"Sexy" (with Rkomi featuring Guè)	2023	45		No Stress
"Buio" (featuring Giorgia)	2025	36		Antologia della vita e della morte

== Collaborations ==
List of album tracks, with chart positions and album name
Title	Year	Peak chart positions	Album
Title	Year	ITA	Album
"Amore mio" (Valerio Sgargi featuring Irama)	2014	—	Non-album singles
"Per te" (Valerio Sgargi featuring Irama)	2014	—	Non-album singles
"Fino a farmi male" (Benji & Fede featuring Irama)	2016	—	20:05
"Saturno e Venere" (Il Volo featuring Irama)	2024	—	Ad Astra
"Chhiù bene'e me" (Rocco Hunt featuring Irama)	2025	98	Ragazzo di giù
"Mille problemi" (Shablo featuring Irama, Joshua and Tormento)	2025	83	Manifesto
"—" denotes singles that did not chart or were not released.

== Writing credits ==
List of selected songs co-written by Irama
Title	Year	Artist	Album
"Anna"	2025	Alfa	Non so chi ha creato il mondo ma so che era innamorato (Deluxe)
