= Ele A =

Swiss rapper (born 2002)

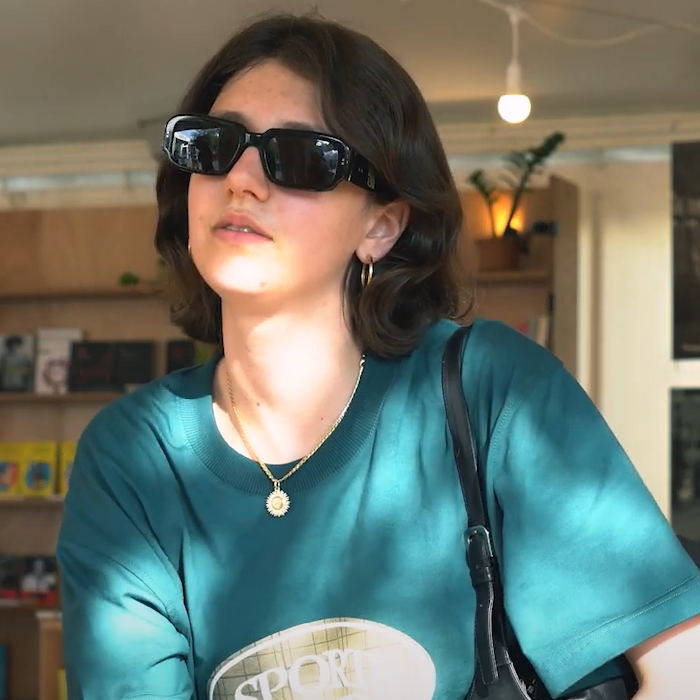
- Ele A in 2025

Background information
- Born: Eleonora Antognini; 11 July 2002 (age 24); Sorengo, Switzerland
- Genres: Hip-hop; drum and bass; jazz rap
- Occupations: Rapper; singer; songwriter
- Years active: 2022–present
- Labels: Believe Music; EMI; Universal Music Italia

Eleonora Antognini (born 11 July 2002), known professionally as Ele A, is a Swiss rapper, singer and songwriter. She has released one studio album and two extended plays.

== Early years ==
Born in Sorengo and raised between Aranno and Lugano, Ele A is the daughter of two music teachers from Ticino. She studied cello for several years before approaching hip-hop during middle school thanks to Gemitaiz.

Ele A attended the linguistic high school in Lugano, with a focus on English. At the age of eighteen she worked in a graphics studio for a friend of her parents, who convinced her to pursue her dream, hip-hop. In 2020, she started writing and publishing freestyles and remixes on social media, quickly gaining visibility in the local scene.

== Career ==
=== 2022–2023: Zerodue Demo and Globo ===
On 19 June 2022, Ele A distributed her demo, Zerodue Demo, in physical format, printing only two hundred copies, and began performing live in Italy and abroad, also participating in the Mi Ami Festival in Milan and the Sziget Festival in Budapest thanks to her manager Andrea Favrin, known thanks to a Coronavirus Freestyle published on Instagram.

On 29 November 2022, Ele A released the single Mikado, produced by Disse, which anticipated the release of her first official EP Globo (2023), which includes two other singles, "Globo", released on 17 January 2023 and "Uno9999", released on 7 March. Also in 2023, she released the singles "Tennis club" and took part in the Red Bull Posse NihaoNihao with the rapper duo Slings and Diss Gacha.

In the same year, Ele A collaborated on the single "C'est la vie" by Laurent Bardainne and Tigre d'Eau Douce, on the single "Verdad" by Golden Years with Joan Thiele (contained in the album Era spaziale), on the song "El clàsico" by DJ Shocca with Guè (contained in the album Sacrosanto) and on the song "Game" with Bassi Maestro by VillaBanks (contained in the album VillaBanks). She is also present on all four versions of Basta Session nº1 by Disse, Goedi, Veezo, Bassi Maestro, Crookers, Lvnar, Ensi and Colombre.

=== 2024: Acqua ===
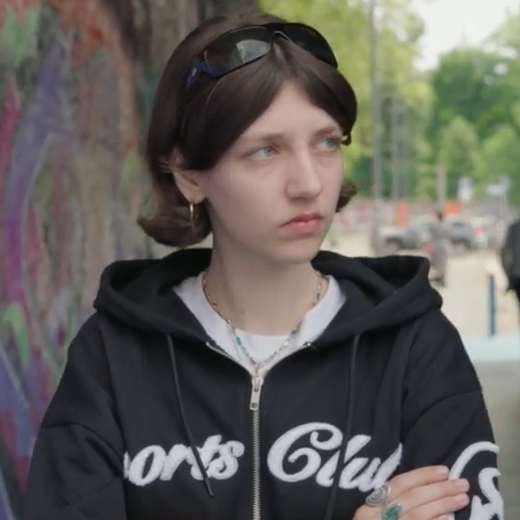
Ele A in 2024

In 2023, Ele A moved to Milan and signed with EMI, a sub-label of Universal Music Italia and on 5 March, she released the single "Dafalgan". On 10 May, she released her second EP Acqua, consolidating her position as one of the new emerging voices of Italian-language hip-hop. On the same day, the song "Oceano" was extracted from the EP as a radio single and which saw the collaboration of Nerissima Serpe. On 10 December, the single "Bounce" was released.

In 2024, Ele A collaborated on numerous songs with other artists, namely the song "Leao" by Peet, the single "Chanelina soubrette" by Sayf, together with Disme, the song "Divieto di sosta" by Estremo, "Finale chimica" on the album by Cor Veleno and "Mentre il mondo esplode " by Mace with Marco Castello.

In the summer of 2024, Ele A was busy with the Acqua tour, which passed by the Largo Venue in Rome and the historic Hiroshima Mon Amour club in Turin and culminates with the show on 17 November, at the Magazzini Generali in Milan.

=== 2025–present: Pixel ===
In 2025, Ele A signed even more collaborations than the year before. She released the single "Febbre dell'oro" together with Promessa, collaborated on the single "Players Club '25" by Night Skinny, worked on the famous format Red Bull 64 Bars, publishing "64 barre di dopamina", collaborated with Guè on "Gazelle", with Franco126 on "Occhi ingenui" (entered into radio rotation from 16 January 2026), with Shablo, Joshua and Tormento on "Karma Loop", with Neffa and Francesca Michielin on "Tuttelestelle", with DJ Shocca and Nitro on Baggy, with Bnkr44 on "Club 44", with Pura Pura, Ledouble and Milanezie on the single "Villa", with Lou Kaena and Soukey on the song "Redwhite", the official piece dedicated to the Switzerland women's national football team and on the song "Air" by Sick Luke with Venerus (contained in the album Dopamina).

In the summer of 2025, Ele A was engaged in a summer tour of twenty-two dates in Italian festivals and then extended to other European countries.

On 16 July 2025, Ele A released the single "Ombre di città" with Colapesce, which was the only single from the debut studio album Pixel, released on 10 October of the same year. On the same day, the song "Con le mie G" was extracted from the album as a radio single and which saw the collaboration of Guè and Night Skinny. On 26 November, she won the revelation award at the Billboard Italia Women in Music, held at the UFO Milano. She was subsequently engaged in five dates of the tour in Italian clubs, the Pixel tour 2026, which contains her first concert at the Alcatraz in Milan and the eight dates of the European tour, the Ele A European tour, which covers major cities London, Barcelona, Paris and Berlin.

== Artistry ==
=== Musical style and influences ===
Ele A has stated that she draws inspiration from the 90s East Coast hip-hop of the United States, citing artists such as Nas and The Notorious B.I.G., combining old-school drum and bass sounds, jazz and references to the Frutiger Aero style with contemporary languages and themes. Her songs are also characterised by clean metrics and a conscious use of melody; in her early works, Ele A chooses to use more interlocking elements from the technical rap of the 2000s, as seen in the EP Globo, only to abandon them almost completely after the release of Pixel, in order to try to simplify the lyrics and reach the essence of the concepts without wordplay.

She also stated that she was formed as an artist thanks to compilations and mixtapes such as Michael Jackson's Number Ones, Gemitaiz's Quello che vi consiglio vol. 2 and Mac Miller's Faces.

The Ticino and Swiss origins often shine through in the Ele A's lyrics, as if she wanted to make clear and explicit to the Italian musical scene that there is an Italian-speaking region outside the Italian borders, Ticino.

== Discography ==
=== Studio albums ===
List of studio albums, with selected details
Title	Details	Peak chart positions
Title	Details	ITA
Pixel	Released: 10 October 2025; Label: EMI, Universal Music Italia; Formats: LP, CD, Digital download, streaming	6

=== Extended plays ===
List of extended plays, with selected details
Title	Details	Peak chart positions
Title	Details	ITA
Globo	Released: 14 April 2023; Label: Believe Music; Formats: CD, Digital download, streaming	—
Acqua	Released: 10 May 2024; Label: EMI, Universal Music Italia; Formats: CD, LP, Digital download, streaming	30

=== Demos ===
List of demos
Title	Details
Zeroedue	Released: 19 June 2022; Label: Self-released; Formats: CD

=== Singles ===
==== As lead artist ====
Title	Year	Album
Mikado	2022	Globo
Globo	2023	Globo
Uno9999	2023	Globo
Tennis club	2023	Non-album singles
Dafalgan	2024	Non-album singles
Oceano (feat. Nerissima Serpe)	2024	Non-album singles
Bounce	2024	Non-album singles
64 barre di dopamina	2025	Non-album singles
Ombre di città (feat. Colapesce)	2025	Pixel
Con le mie G (feat. Guè and Night Skinny)	2025	Pixel

==== As featured artist ====
Title	Year	Peak chart positions	Album
Title	Year	ITA	Album
C'est la vie (Laurent Bardainne & Tigre d'Eau Douce feat. Ele A)	2023	—	Non-album single
Verdad (Golden Years feat. Joan Thiele and Ele A)	2023	—	Era spaziale
Basta session nº1 (Goedi feat. Veezo, Ensi, Ele A and Colombre)	2023	—	Basta session nº1
NiHao - Red Bull Posse (Slings feat. Diss Gacha and Ele A)	2023	—	Traphouse
Chanelina soubrette (Sayf feat. Disme and Ele A)	2024	—	Se Dio vuole
Febbre dell'oro (Promessa feat. Ele A)	2025	—	Vite sgrammate
Players Club '25 (Night Skinny feat. Glocky, Rrari Dal Tacco, Promessa, Latrelle, Ele A, Sayf, Melons and Faneto)	2025	75	Non-album single
Villa (Pura Pura feat. Ledouble, Ele A and Milanezie)	2025	—	Side by Side
Occhi ingenui (Franco126 feat. Ele A)	2026	—	Futuri possibili
"—" denotes a recording that did not chart or was not released in that territory.

=== Collaborations ===
Title	Year	Peak chart positions	Album
Title	Year	ITA	Album
El Clasico (DJ Shocca feat. Ele A and Guè)	2023	—	Sacrosanto (Deluxe Edition)
Game (VillaBanks feat. Ele A)	2023	—	VillaBanks
Finale chimico (Cor Veleno feat. Ele A)	2024	—	Fuoco sacro
Mentre il mondo esplode (Mace feat. Marco Castello and Ele A)	2024	75	Māyā
Leao (Peet feat. Ele A)	2024	—	À demain
Divieto di sosta (Estremo feat. Ele A)	2024	—	Era
Gazelle (Guè feat. Ele A)	2025	21	Tropico del Capricorno
Club 44 (Bnkr44 feat. Ele A)	2025	—	Tocca il cielo
Tuttelestelle (Neffa feat. Francesca Michielin and Ele A)	2025	—	Canerandagio parte 1
Baggy (DJ Shocca feat. Ele A and Nitro)	2025	—	60 Hz II
Karma loop (Shablo feat. Ele A, Joshua and Tormento)	2025	—	Manifesto
Air (Sick Luke feat. Venerus and Ele A)	2025	—	Dopamina
Egoista (Emis Killa feat. Ele A and Promessa)	2025	95	Musica triste
Dancing With The Devil pt.2 (Gemitaiz feat. Neffa and Ele A)	2025	39	Elsewhere
"—" denotes a recording that did not chart or was not released in that territory.
