= Primo Brown =

Italian rapper (1976–2016)

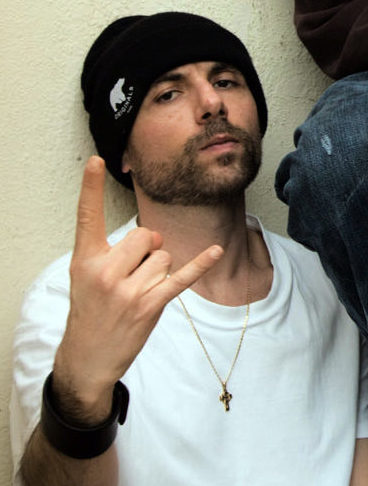
Primo Brown in 2014.

Primo Brown, pseudonym of David Maria Belardi (Rome, June 14, 1976 - Rome, January 1, 2016), was an Italian rapper, known for having played in the rap band Cor Veleno.

Introducing himself to the music scene since the late 1980s, Primo is remembered as an artist of fundamental importance for the development of hip hop culture in Italy, especially in the capital.

== Biography ==
Initially known under the pseudonym of Scheggia, the rapper began to make his name known within the Italian hip hop scene in 1993, when he performed together with Grandi Numeri at the Palladium, on the occasion of the Zulu Party. Thus begins to form the first nucleus of the musical group Cor Veleno (in which DJ Squarta will also be present), so much so that this name is also mentioned in an episode of the broadcast Italy in direct, conducted by the presenter Alda D'Eusanio, in which Primo and Grandi Numeri performed in connection by the Circolo degli Artisti. Track 21 Tyson will then be released under the name Cor Veleno, present in the mixtape of the Rome Zoo collective dedicated to Roman hip hop, entitled La banda der trucido.

The debut with an official album of the trio will then take place in 1999, with the release of the album Sotto assedio, followed two years later by Rock 'n' Roll, and then again with Heavy Metal in 2004. Also in 2004, he participates in the 60 Hz album by DJ Shocca with what will become in the years to come one of his best known songs, Sempre grezzo. In 2005 Primo recorded the Bomboclat album with Squarta, while in 2006 Cor Veleno signed a contract with Sony Music, with which they released Nuovo Nuovo in 2007 and Buona pace two years later. In the meantime, Primo had released another album with Squarta, entitled Leggenda, followed by Qui è selvaggio, from which the song Cantano tutti (based on the Cucchi case) is extracted.

Once published Qui è selvaggio, Primo decides to devote himself to solo projects, as evidenced by the three volumes of the Rap nelle mani mixtape, in which however there is no shortage of collaborations. The latest official project featuring Primo Brown is El micro de oro, created together with rapper Tormento and released in 2014 for the ThisPlay Music label. During the promotion period of the album, however, the artist finds himself having to announce the cancellation of the tour and the withdrawal of the scenes due to serious health problems, which will lead to his death on New Year's Day 2016 at the age of 39 and was buried in the Flaminio Cemetery.

An evening in memory of the artist was organized on 25 March 2016 at the Atlantico club in Rome, which was filmed and made available on YouTube one year after his death.

The film Zeta - a Hip-Hop Story by Cosimo Alemà, released in 2016 and set in the world of hip hop, was dedicated to his memory.

== Discography ==
=== Solo ===
Albums

- 2005 – Bomboclat (with Squarta)
- 2008 – Leggenda (with Squarta)
- 2011 – Qui è selvaggio (with Squarta)
- 2012 – Fin da bambino (with Ibbanez)
- 2014 – El micro de oro (with Tormento)

== Mixtapes ==
- 2011 – La Scanizza mixtape (with Ill Grosso)
- 2011 – Rap nelle mani volume 1
- 2012 – Rap nelle mani volume 2
- 2013 – Rap nelle mani volume 3

=== With Cor Veleno ===
- 2001 – Rock 'n' Roll
- 2004 – Heavy metal
- 2007 – Nuovo nuovo
- 2010 – Buona pace
- 2018 – Lo spirito che suona (posthumous)
