= Senz'anima =

Single by Irama

from the album Antologia della vita e della morte
- Released: 7 November 2025
- Genre: Power ballad
- Length: 3:24
- Label: Warner Music Italy
- Songwriters: Filippo Maria Fanti; Giuseppe Colonnelli
- Composers: Andrea Biviano; Daniele Mona; Giulio Nenna
- Producers: Andrea Biviano; Daniele Mona

Irama singles chronology
"Ex" (2025)	"Senz'anima" (2025)	"Tutto tranne questo" (2026)

Music video
- "Senz'anima" on YouTube

"Senz'anima" (transl. Soulless) is a song by Italian singer-songwriter Irama. It was released on 7 November 2025 by Warner Music Italy as the fifth single from the fifth studio album, Antologia della vita e della morte.

== Description ==
The song, a power ballad written by the singer-songwriter himself with Giuseppe Colonnelli, was produced by Andrea Biviano and Daniele Mona. It tells the story of a toxic relationship between two people who can't get together without hurting each other, but at the same time can't separate completely.

== Promotion ==
Originally released on 17 October 2025 as the second track on the album Antologia della vita e della morte, on 7 November the song was made available as a single for radio rotation. On 28 November the singer-songwriter performed the song live during the semi-final of the nineteenth edition of the talent show X Factor.

== Music video ==
The visual video, directed by Amedeo Zancanella, was released on 17 October 2025, on the Irama's YouTube channel. The official videoclip was published the following 28 November on the same YouTube channel.

== Charts ==
Weekly chart performance for "Senz'anima"
Chart (2025)	Peak position
Italy (FIMI)	59
Italy Airplay (EarOne)	1
