= Pem Pem =

2018 single by Elettra Lamborghini

Single by Elettra Lamborghini

from the album Twerking Queen
- Language: Spanish
- Released: 2 February 2018
- Genre: Reggaeton
- Length: 2:54
- Label: Island; Universal
- Songwriters: Elettra Lamborghini; Gionata Boschetti; Paolo Alberto Monachetti; Pablo Miguel Lombroni Capalbo
- Producers: Mickey Miguel; Shablo

Elettra Lamborghini singles chronology
| "Pem Pem" (2018) | "Mala" (2018) |

"Pem Pem" is the debut single by Italian singer Elettra Lamborghini. It was released on 2 February 2018 as the lead single from her debut studio album Twerking Queen. The song is written in Spanish and features strong Latin and reggaeton influences.

== Background and promotion ==
After having collaborated with Gué Pequeno and Sfera Ebbasta in the remix of the single Lamborghini and having participated in the video of the song, Lamborghini presents herself as a singer with the song Pem Pem.

On 2 February 2018, Lamborghini performed the song during the NBA halftime show at the Staples Center in Los Angeles. To further promote the song, the Pem Pem Challenge was launched, which consists of posting videos on social media in which one twerks to the rhythm of the song.

== Music video ==
The music video for "Pem Pem" was shot in the United States and directed by Jansen & Rodriguez. It was released on the singer's Vevo - YouTube channel on 13 February 2018. The clip features Lamborghini singing and dancing in the company of dancers. The video begins with her bringing a boy into a bedroom with dim red lights. As soon as they enter, Lamborghini throws the boy onto the bed and begins dancing and twerking on top of him. The boy begins to touch Lamborghini and is seduced by her curvy curves. Clips of the bedroom scenes follow one another until the end of the video when she greets the boy in a flirtatious way and leaves the room. The boy is exhausted and remains on the bed. The video ends with the boy writing to Lamborghini and asking her to see him again to repeat the experience. It has reached over 160 million views.

== Charts ==
Chart performance for "Pem Pem"
| Chart (2018) | Peak position |
|---|---|
| Italy (FIMI) | 6 |

== Certifications ==
Certifications for "Pem Pem"
| Region | Certification | Certified units/sales |
|---|---|---|
| Italy (FIMI) | 2× Platinum | 100,000^{‡} |
^{‡} Sales+streaming figures based on certification alone.
