= Pixel (album) =

Studio album by Ele A
- Released: 10 October 2025
- Genres: Pop rap; jazz rap; boom bap
- Length: 34:30
- Language: Italian
- Labels: EMI; Universal Music Italy
- Producers: Colapesce; Dibla; Disse; Ele A; Estremo; Jiz; Lil Chick; Madfingerz; Night Skinny; Pierfrancesco Pasini; Shune; Tre Flip

Singles from Pixel
- 1. "Ombre di città" Released: 16 July 2025; 2. "Con le mie G" Released: 10 October 2025

Pixel is the debut studio album by Swiss rapper Ele A, The album was released on 10 October 2025, by EMI and Universal Music Italia.

The album consists of thirteen tracks written by Ele A herself with the collaboration of authors and producers, including Lorenzo Urciullo, aka Colapesce, Luca Di Blasi, aka Dibla, Enea Zeno Di Salvo, aka Disse, Enrico Botta, aka Estremo, Giorgio De Lauri, aka Jiz, Tristan Jasmin, aka Lil Chick, Emilio Barberini, aka Madfingerz, Luca Pace, aka Night Skinny, Pierfrancesco Pasini, Luca Ghiazzi, aka Shune, and Giuseppe Piccirillo, aka Tre Flip. It features seven collaborations with Colapesce, Gaia, Guè, Nes, Night Skinny, Promessa, and Sayf.

== Release and promotion ==
On 16 July 2025, Ele A released the single "Ombre di città" with Colapesce, which was the only single from the debut studio album Pixel, released on 10 October of the same year. On the same day, the song "Con le mie G" was extracted from the album as a radio single and which saw the collaboration of Guè and Night Skinny.

== Critical reception ==
Pixel ratings
Review scores
Source	Rating
Newsic	7,25/10
Rockol	7/10
Ondarock	6/10

=== Year-end rankings ===
In the year-end lists of 2025, Pixel was placed within the top 5 of Billboard Italia, top 40 of Rockit, and top 10 of Rolling Stone Italia.

Select year-end rankings of Pixel
Critic/Publication	List	Rank	Ref.
Billboard Italia	The Best Italian Albums of 2025	4	
Rockit	The 50 Best Italian Albums of 2025	34	
Rolling Stone Italia	The 50 Best Italian Albums of 2025	7	

== Track listing ==
No.	Title	Writer(s)	Length
1.	"Ti aspetto"	Eleonora Antognini, Luca Ghiazzi, Enea Zeno Di Salvo, Rocco Biazzi	2:21
2.	"Buon esempio" (featuring Promessa and Sayf)	Eleonora Antognini, Pietro Messa, Adam Viacava, Luca Di Blasi, Enea Zeno Di Salvo, Giorgio De Lauri	3:01
3.	"DDL" (featuring Night Skinny)	Eleonora Antognini, Luca Pace	2:47
4.	"Con le mie G" (Guè e Night Skinny)	Eleonora Antognini, Cosimo Fini, Luca Pace, Zyah Ahmonuel	2:51
5.	"Quintale"	Eleonora Antognini, Enea Zeno Di Salvo, Giuseppe Piccirillo	2:41
6.	"091"	Eleonora Antognini, Enea Zeno Di Salvo	2:18
7.	"X te"	Eleonora Antognini, Enea Zeno Di Salvo	2:22
8.	"Mai" (featuring Gaia)	Eleonora Antognini, Gaia Gozzi, Enea Zeno Di Salvo, Enrico Botta, Emilio Barberini	2:39
9.	"Windy Days"	Eleonora Antognini, Enea Zeno Di Salvo	2:25
10.	"Cielo grigio" (featuring Nes)	Eleonora Antognini, Nes, Lil Chick, Enea Zeno Di Salvo	2:18
11.	"Pixel"	Eleonora Antognini, Enea Zeno Di Salvo	2:40
12.	"Ombre di città" (with Colapesce)	Eleonora Antognini, Lorenzo Urciullo, Enea Zeno Di Salvo	3:03
13.	"Atlantide"	Eleonora Antognini, Milo Antognini	3:04
Total length:			34:30

== Charts ==
Chart performance for Pixel
Chart (2025)	Peak position
Italian Albums (FIMI)	6
