= Twerking Queen =

Studio album by Elettra Lamborghini
- Released: 14 June 2019
- Recorded: 2018–2019
- Genre: Pop; reggaeton
- Length: 47:42
- Language: Italian, Spanish, Portuguese, English
- Label: Island; Universal Music

Elettra Lamborghini chronology
Twerking Queen (2019)	Twerking Beach (2021)

Singles from Twerking Queen
- 1. "Pem Pem" Released: February 2, 2018; 2. "Mala" Released: September 21, 2018; 3. "Tócame" Released: June 5, 2019; 4. "Fanfare" Released: July 19, 2019; 5. "Musica (e il resto scompare)" Released: February 6, 2020

Twerking Queen is the debut studio album by Italian singer Elettra Lamborghini, released on 14 June 2019 by Island and Universal.

On 14 February 2020, it was released a deluxe edition entitled Twerking Queen (el resto es nada), with the single "Musica (e il resto scompare)" performed at the Sanremo Music Festival 2020.

== Track listing ==
Standard edition
No.	Title	Writer(s)	Length
1.	"Tócame" (featuring Pitbull)	Elettra Lamborghini; Armando Christian Pérez; Andrea Maria Rosa Dury Ospina; Donald Hoitink; Pablo Miguel Lombroni Capalbo; Steve Keanu Tandaju; Steven Kwik	2:41
2.	"Corazón morado" (featuring Sfera Ebbasta)	Lamborghini; Gionata Boschetti; Umberto Odoguardi	3:32
3.	"Pem Pem"	Lamborghini; Boschetti; Lombroni Capalbo; Paolo Monachetti	2:54
4.	"Fanfare" (featuring Gué Pequeno)	Michele Canova; Davide Petrella; Cosimo Fini	3:01
5.	"Fuerte"	Jacopo Ettorre; Riccardo Scirè	2:37
6.	"Te quemas" (featuring MC G15)	Lamborghini; Gabriel Paixao Soares; Josias De La Cruz	2:41
7.	"Pegaditos"	Paride Galimi; Jerry Vasquez; Lombroni Capalbo	2:52
8.	"Maldito día"	Lamborghini; Lombroni Capalbo; Stefano Tognini	3:24
9.	"Ven"	Lamborghini; Marco Masís Fernández; Martin Rodrigues Vicente	2:59
10.	"Mala"	Lamborghini; Eric Celis Marin; De La Cruz; Vicente	2:56

Twerking Queen (el resto es nada)
No.	Title	Writer(s)	Length
11.	"Musica (e il resto scompare)"	Canova; Petrella	3:16
12.	"Musica (el resto es nada)"	Canova; Petrella	3:16
13.	"Non succederà più" (featuring Myss Keta)	Claudia Mori; Giancarlo Bigazzi	3:13
14.	"Maldito día (Remix)" (featuring Rkomi)	Lamborghini; Mirko Martorana; Andrea Rosi; Marco Schietroma; Lombroni Capalbo; Tognini	3:09
15.	"Te quemas (Remix)" (featuring Samurai Jay & MamboLosco)	Lamborghini; Gennaro Amatore; William Miller Hickman III; Soares; De La Cruz	2:33
16.	"Bombonera"	Davide Simonetta; Paolo Antonacci; Andrea Ferrara	2:47

== Charts ==
=== Weekly charts ===
Weekly chart performance for Twerking Queen
Chart (2019)	Peak position
Italian Albums (FIMI)	3

=== Year-end charts ===
2020 year-end chart performance for Twerking Queen
Chart (2020)	Position
Italian Albums (FIMI)	39
