= Ex (Irama song) =

Single by Irama featuring Elodie

from the album Antologia della vita e della morte
- Released: 29 August 2025
- Genre: Latin pop; urban pop
- Length: 3:04
- Label: Warner Music Italy
- Songwriters: Filippo Maria Fanti; Elodie Di Patrizi; Giuseppe Colonnelli
- Composers: Gabriel Rossi; Giulio Nenna; Lorenzo Santarelli; Marco Salvaderi
- Producer: ROOM9

Irama singles chronology
"Lentamente" (2025)	"Ex" (2025)	"Senz'anima" (2025)

Elodie singles chronology
"Yakuza" (2025)	"Ex" (2025)	"Fieri di noi - United 4 Children" (2025)

Music video
- "Ex" on YouTube

"Ex" is a song co-written and recorded by Italian singer-songwriter Irama with featured vocals by Italian singer-songwriter Elodie. It was released on 29 August 2025 by Warner Music Italy as the fourth single from the fifth studio album, Antologia della vita e della morte.

== Description ==
The song, written by both artists with Giuseppe Colonnelli, was produced by Room9, a group composed of Gabriel Rossi, aka Kende, Lorenzo Santarelli, and Marco Salvaderi. This duet, marking the first collaboration between the two artists, speaks of a broken love.

== Promotion ==
The collaboration between the two artists was revealed on 25 August 2025, following the spread of a video on social media showing the two artists on set filming the song's music video. The following day, the artists confirmed the duet on their social media profiles.

== Music video ==
The music video, directed by Attilio Cusani, was released on the Irama's YouTube channel to coincide with the song's release.

== Charts ==
Weekly chart performance for "Ex"
Chart (2025)	Peak position
Italy (FIMI)	11
Italy Airplay (EarOne)	5

== Certifications ==
Certifications for "Ex"
Region	Certification	Certified units/sales
Italy (FIMI)	Gold	100,000^{‡}
^{‡} Sales+streaming figures based on certification alone.
