= Galassie =

Single by Irama

from the album Antologia della vita e della morte
- Released: 17 May 2024
- Genre: Dance pop
- Length: 3:40
- Label: Warner Music Italy
- Songwriters: Filippo Maria Fanti; Alfredo Rapetti; Federica Abbate; Giuseppe Colonnelli
- Composers: Filippo Maria Fanti; Federica Abbate; Giulio Nenna; Michele Zocca
- Producers: Giulio Nenna; Michelangelo

Irama singles chronology
"Tu no" (2024)	"Galassie" (2024)	"Lentamente" (2025)

Music video
- "Galassie" on YouTube

"Galassie" (transl. Galaxies) is a song by Italian singer-songwriter Irama. It was released on 17 May 2024 by Warner Music Italy as the second single from the fifth studio album, Antologia della vita e della morte.

== Description ==
The song, written by the singer-songwriter himself with Alfredo Rapetti, aka Cheope, and Federica Abbate with production by Michele Zocca, aka Michelangelo, talks about a love story and features a quote from Franco Battiato, namely "I will protect you from every melancholy" from "La cura".

== Promotion ==
The song was premiered by the singer-songwriter himself on 12 May 2024, during the semifinal of the twenty-third edition of the talent show Amici di Maria De Filippi. On 15 May he then performed it live during his concert at the Verona Arena.

== Music video ==
The music video, directed by Zak Tassler, was released on 13 June 2024 through the Irama's YouTube channel.

== Charts ==
Weekly chart performance for "Galassie"
Chart (2024)	Peak position
Italy (FIMI)	21
Italy Airplay (EarOne)	16

== Certifications ==
Certifications for "Galassie"
Region	Certification	Certified units/sales
Italy (FIMI)	Platinum	100,000^{‡}
^{‡} Sales+streaming figures based on certification alone.
