= Antologia della vita e della morte =

Studio album by Irama
- Released: 17 October 2025
- Recorded: 2023–2025
- Genre: Pop
- Length: 45:41
- Label: Warner Music Italy
- Producer: Andrea Biviano; Cripo; Cromatico; Daniele Mona; Danien; DB; Giulio Nenna; Gow Tribe; Juli; Michelangelo; Room9; Vincenzo Luca Faraone

Irama chronology
No Stress (2023)	Antologia della vita e della morte (2025)

Singles from Antologia della vita e della morte
- 1. "Tu no" Released: 7 February 2024; 2. "Galassie" Released: 17 May 2024; 3. "Lentamente" Released: 12 February 2025; 4. "Ex" Released: 29 August 2025; 5. "Senz'anima" Released: 7 November 2025; 6. "Tutto tranne questo" Released: 16 January 2026; 7. "Cabana" Released: 15 May 2026

Antologia della vita e della morte (transl. Anthology of Life and Death) is the fifth studio album by Italian singer-songwriter Irama, released on 17 October 2025 by Warner Music Italy.

The album contains the songs "Tu no" and "Lentamente", with which the singer-songwriter competed respectively at the 74th Sanremo Music Festival, finishing in fifth place, and at the 75th Sanremo Music Festival, finishing in ninth place.

== Background and composition ==
The album, which is mainly based on the pop genre with influences from country pop, dance-pop, electropop, pop rock and urban, is made up of fourteen tracks written by the singer-songwriter himself with the collaboration of artists and producers. The album features three collaborations with Achille Lauro, Giorgia and Elodie. Interviewed by Cosmopolitan Italia, Irama explained the meaning and choice of the album's title:

The title came later, and on the one hand, it stems from the admiration I've always had for Fabrizio De André; it's a tribute to his work on Edgar Lee Masters' Spoon River Anthology. On the other hand, this title was a logical consequence for me, also because this album is a collection of stories, in this case stories of life and death, which is, let's say, this eternal dualism that is part of humanity and a thousand cultures. Think of Yin and Yang, the balance between darkness and light, good and evil.

Interviewed by Billboard Italia, Irama talked about the creative process for the album:

After I wrote Il giorno in cui ho smesso di pensare, I started working on the album, the next one, actually. It took me a long time. Or rather, in my opinion, it's not much, but for today's recording industry, it's a lot, because we have a different pace and sometimes it doesn't allow you, in my opinion, to study, to research. I didn't care a bit, to be honest, but not out of disrespect for the people who follow me, but because I needed to do a job to give them something I cared about. Then I didn't hide the fact that I had insecurities and I was afraid, also because perfection is utopian, therefore impossible to achieve, but at a certain point I tried to become aware and ensure that this work of years reached people as it was. [...] The album revolves around what home is, the concept of home, the intimacy that a home can have. A place where you can undress, let's say, and where you should be alone in theory, but in this case not.

== Promotion ==
=== Singles ===
The album's first single, "Tu no", was released on 7 February 2024, coinciding with the singer-songwriter's participation in the 74th Sanremo Music Festival.

"Galassie" was released as the album's second single on 17 May 2024.

The third single from the album, "Lentamente", was released on 12 February 2025, coinciding with the singer-songwriter's participation in the 75th Sanremo Music Festival.

On 29 August 2025, "Ex", featuring Elodie, was released as the album's fourth single.

On 7 November 2025 the second track "Senz'anima" entered radio rotation as the fifth single from the album.

On 16 January 2026 the fifth track "Tutto tranne questo" entered radio rotation as the sixth single from the album.

On 15 May 2026 "Cabana" was released as the first single from the digital reissue of the album.

=== Tour ===
To promote the album, the singer-songwriter embarked on a five-date in-store tour from 17 to 23 October 2025, from Milan to Turin. This will be followed by a 11 June 2026, date when the artist will perform for the first time at the Giuseppe Meazza Stadium in Milan.

== Track listing ==
Antologia della vita e della morte – Standard track listing
No.	Title	Lyrics	Music	Producer(s)	Length
1.	"Arizona" (featuring Achille Lauro)	Filippo Maria Fanti; Lauro De Marinis; Giuseppe Colonnelli	Daniele Nelli; Giacomo Pasutto; Giulio Nenna; Matteo Ciceroni	Danien; Giulio Nenna; Gow Tribe	2:49
2.	"Senz'anima"	Fanti; Colonnelli	Andrea Biviano; Daniele Mona; Nenna	Biviano; Mona; Nenna	3:24
3.	"Buio" (featuring Giorgia)	Fanti; Colonnelli	Davide Epicoco; Nenna; Gloria Collecchia	Nenna	3:05
4.	"Polvere"	Fanti; Colonnelli	Andrea Debernardi; Epicoco; Gabriel Rossi; Lorenzo Santarelli; Marco Salvaderi	DB; Room9	3:07
5.	"Tutto tranne questo"	Fanti; Colonnelli; Jacopo Lazzarini	Alessandro Merli; Fabio Clemente; Lazzarini; Nenna; Pierfrancesco Pasini; Rene Cano	Nenna	2:42
6.	"Galassie"	Fanti; Alfredo Rapetti; Colonnelli; Federica Abbate	Fanti; Abbate; Michele Zocca; Nenna	Michelangelo; Nenna	3:39
7.	"Mi mancherai moltissimo"	Fanti; Colonnelli	Epicoco; Nenna; Rapetti	Nenna	3:25
8.	"48 ore"	Fanti; Colonnelli; Daniele Fossatelli	Julien Boverod; Nenna	Juli; Nenna	2:55
9.	"Ex" (featuring Elodie)	Fanti; Elodie Di Patrizi; Colonnelli	Nenna; Rossi; Salvaderi; Santarelli	Room9	3:04
10.	"Giulia"	Fanti; Colonnelli; Davide Petrella	Epicoco; Nenna	DB; Nenna	2:55
11.	"Lentamente"	Fanti; Colonnelli; Riccardo Fabbriconi; Zocca	Fabbriconi; Zocca	Michelangelo	3:26
12.	"Circo"	Fanti; Colonnelli; Francesco Monti	Vincenzo Luca Faraone	Faraone	4:27
13.	"Tu no"	Fanti	Colonnelli; Emanuele Mattozzi; Monti; Nenna	Nenna	4:27
14.	"Il giorno"	Fanti; Colonnelli; Monti	Debernardi; Epicoco; Nenna	Nenna	4:27

Antologia della vita e della morte digital re-issue
No.	Title	Lyrics	Music	Producer(s)	Length
15.	"Cabana"	Fanti	Fanti; Nenna; Nicola Lazzarin	Cripo	2:47

== Charts ==
=== Weekly charts ===
Weekly chart performance for Antologia della vita e della morte
Chart (2025)	Peak position
Italian Albums (FIMI)	1
Swiss Albums (Schweizer Hitparade)	39

=== Year-end charts ===
Year-end chart performance for Antologia della vita e della morte
Chart	Year	Position
Italian Albums (FIMI)	2025	88

== Certifications ==
Certifications for Antologia della vita e della morte
Region	Certification	Certified units/sales
Italy (FIMI)	Platinum	50,000^{‡}
^{‡} Sales+streaming figures based on certification alone.
