= La mia parola =

Single by Shablo featuring Guè, Joshua and Tormento

from the album Manifesto
- Language: Italian
- Released: 12 February 2025
- Genre: Old-school hip-hop; Hip-hop soul
- Length: 2:50
- Label: Oyster; Island; Urubamba
- Songwriters: Cosimo Fini; Joshua Bale; Massimiliano Cellamaro; Edoardo Medici; Pablo Miguel Lombroni Capalbo; Ernesto Conocchia; Roberto Lamanna; Luca Faraone
- Producers: Shablo; Luca Faraone

Shablo singles chronology
"Hope" (2024)	"La mia parola" (2025)	"Gelido (Live Session)" (2025)

Guè singles chronology
"Oh mamma mia" (2025)	"La mia parola" (2025)	"Meravigliosa" (2025)

Joshua singles chronology
"Hope" (2024)	"La mia parola" (2025)	"Gelido (Live Session)" (2025)

Tormento singles chronology
"Luci su di me" (2024)	"La mia parola" (2025)	"Rolling Papers" (2025)

Music video
- "La mia parola" on YouTube

La mia parola (Italian for "My word") is a song by Italian DJ and music producer Shablo, featuring guest vocals by Italian singer Joshua and Italian rappers Guè and Tormento. It competed at the Sanremo Music Festival 2025, finishing in 18th position and served as the lead single from Shablo's fourth studio album, Manifesto.

== Music video ==
A music video, produced by Borotalco.tv and directed by Enea Colombi, was released on 12 February 2025 on Shablo's YouTube channel.

== Charts ==
=== Weekly charts ===
Chart performance for "La mia parola"
Chart (2025)	Peak position
Italy (FIMI)	7
Italy Airplay (EarOne)	35
Switzerland (Schweizer Hitparade)	96

=== Year-end charts ===
Year-end chart performance for "La mia parola"
Chart (2025)	Position
Italy (FIMI)	44

== Certifications ==
Certifications for "La mia parola"
Region	Certification	Certified units/sales
Italy (FIMI)	Platinum	200,000^{‡}
^{‡} Sales+streaming figures based on certification alone.
