= Cor Veleno =

Italian band

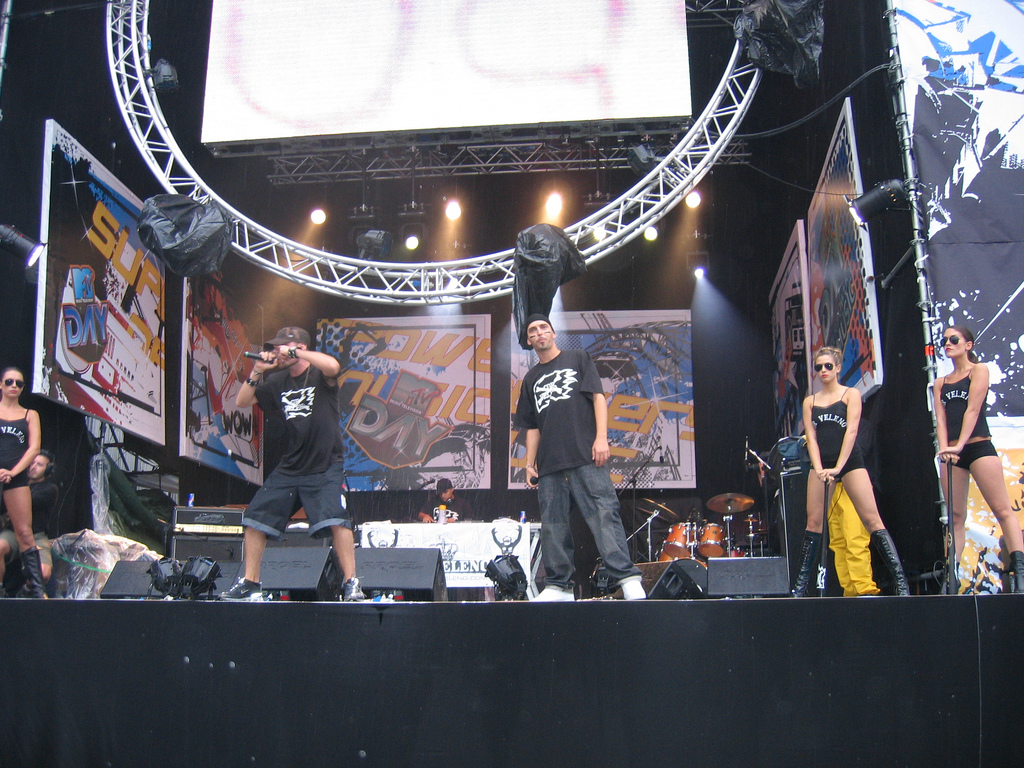
- Cor Veleno in concert at the MTV Day in 2006

Background information
- Origin: Rome, Italy
- Genres: Hardcore hip hop
- Years active: 1993–present
- Labels: CD Club Entertainment (1999–2000); Robbacoatta Factory (2000–2001); Antibemusic (2001–2004); Sony Music Italy (2004–2010); Cor Veleno Records (2009–present)
- Members: Squarta; Grandi Numeri
- Past members: Primo Brown, 2016 (due to his death)

Cor Veleno is an Italian hardcore hip hop music group, made up of the producer Squarta with the rappers Grandi Numeri and Primo Brown, the latter of whom died in 2016.

== History of the group ==
=== First years ===
The first nucleus of the collective was born in 1993 made up of Primo Brown and Grandi Numeri who play at the Zulu Party, a Roman hip hop event held at the Palladium festival.

Primo Brown, Grandi Numeri and Detor (DJ and composer of the first beats of the group, which Squarta later took over), released in 1998 their first single, 21 Tyson, in the mixtape La banda der trucido. The track gets a notable underground response and is included in other compilations. The next piece is Incompatibile, a piece made in collaboration with Piotta in memory of his friend MC Giaime. After these singles that get a good critical success, they open the lives of American groups like De La Soul and Wu-Tang Clan.

=== Debut ===
In 2001 they debuted with their first album Rock 'n' Roll, some of which were published for the soundtrack of the film Ultimo Stadio, by director Ivano De Matteo. In 2004 they come out with Heavy metal, an ideal continuation of their first work. Participates in the disc as a guest Tormento ex Sottotono. The same year they won the MC Giaime award for two categories: best text for Un mestiere qualunque and best song for Le guardie, I pompieri and L'ambulanza. In the same period Bomboclat was also released, published under the name Primo & Squarta and which was attended by Grandi Numeri, Amir, Danno (Colle der Fomento), the Club Dogo, Turi and Tormento.

In 2005 they were invited to the Splash! Festival in Germany as the only Italian rap group. For the first time, Italian hip hop participates in this event and Cor Veleno tread the same stage as artists such as Saïan Supa Crew, Dilated Peoples, Smif-n-Wessun and Nas.

After working with them in a jam session in the recording studio, the singer-songwriter Jovanotti wants them as a shoulder group for his tour, entrusting them with the first half hour of his show. From the session in the studio, on the other hand, the song Cose pericolose was released, present in the special edition of the Jovanotti Buon Sangue album. Also in 2005 they were the opening group for the Italian dates of the American rapper 50 Cent, for the nu metal group Linea 77, Gogol Bordello and Manu Chao.

=== Nuovo nuovo and Buona pace ===
At the beginning of 2006 they sign a contract for Sony Music, for which they release the third official album of the group entitled Nuovo nuovo, released February 16, 2007, for Sony / BMG Ricordi, which features Roy Paci, Tormento and Kitsch among the guests. Between 2007 and 2008 they participate in Roy Paci's live shows, together with whom they write the song Tango Mambo Jambo present on the album SuoNoGlobal by Roy Paci & Aretuska.

In 2008 the second album by Primo & Squarta was released, Leggenda for Cor Veleno Records, in which Grandi Numeri, Amir, MadBuddy, Cico (ex-members of Roy Paci & Aretuska) and Ibbanez took part. The singles Sotto Shock, Spigne and Rock'n'roll Gangsta are extracted from the album.

On July 2, 2009, a song entitled L'imbastita began to circulate online, while on August 10, the video clip of the Falso song was published on YouTube, followed by the EP Pace armata, released December 17 for free download. Since May 7, 2010, L'odore del mare, the pioneering single of the album Buona pace, which debuted at position #84 of the official FIMI ranking, has been in rotation on all radios.

In 2010 they took part in the shooting of Aureliano Amadei's film 20 sigarette (presented out of competition at the 67th Venice International Film Festival) in a cameo, playing themselves. In December 2010 he released his third album in the name of Primo & Squarta titled Qui è selvaggio, which saw the collaboration with rappers from the Roman scene and beyond.

=== Last years ===
In July 2012 Primo Brown released for the Latlantide label the album Fin da bambino together with Ibbanez, the tracks were produced by Ill Grosso and mixed by Squarta. In 2014 Primo Brown, together with Egreen, collaborates with rapper Jesto in the song Vorresti fare il rapper? excerpt from Supershallo 2 album.

In September 2014 Primo Brown announced his retirement from the music scene due to health problems, the same that led to his death in the night between December 31, 2015, and January 1, 2016.

During 2018 the group released the singles Shut Tha Fuck Up and Tutta la vita with the related official videos announcing the release of the new album of unreleased Cor Veleno Lo Spirito che suona, released on October 26, 2018.

== Formation ==
Current

- Grandi Numeri – rapping (1993)
- Squarta – scratching, sampler (1993)

=== Former components ===
- Primo Brown – rapping (1993-2016)

== Discography ==
- 1999 – Sotto assedio
- 2001 – Rock 'n' Roll
- 2004 – Heavy metal
- 2007 – Nuovo nuovo
- 2010 – Buona pace
- 2018 – Lo spirito che suona

== Filmography ==
- Zora la vampira, directed by Manetti Bros. (2000)
- Ultimo stadio, directed by Ivano De Matteo (2002)
- 20 sigarette, directed by Aureliano Amadei (2010)

== Bibliography ==
- Gianluca Testani (edited by), Enciclopedia del rock italiano, Roma, Arcana Edizioni, 2006.
