= Sayf (rapper) =

Italian rapper and singer-songwriter (born 1999)

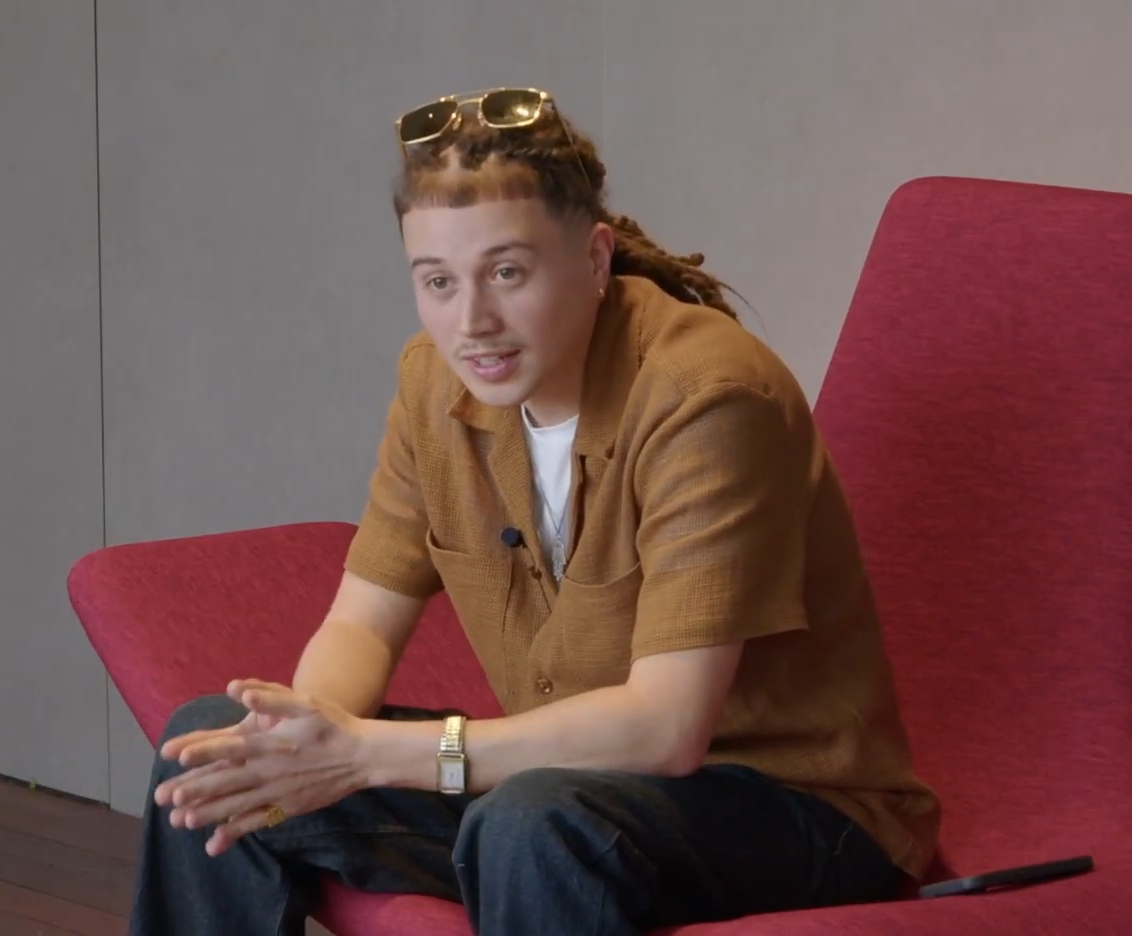
- Sayf in February 2026

Background information
- Born: Adam Sayf Viacava; 23 March 1999 (age 27); Genoa, Liguria, Italy
- Genres: Rap; trap; reggae fusion; rap metal
- Occupations: Rapper; singer; songwriter; musician
- Instruments: Vocals; trumpet
- Years active: 2017–present
- Labels: 2BE; Warner; Atlantic; La Santa
- Member of: Genovarabe
- Formerly of: Luvre Muzik

Adam Sayf Viacava (born 23 March 1999), known mononymously as Sayf (pronounced [ˈseif]), is an Italian rapper and singer-songwriter.

== Early life ==
Born in Genoa to an Italian father, Gaetano, and a Tunisian mother, Samia Ghariani (who separated when he was 9), Viacava spent his childhood moving between his birth city, Rapallo and Santa Margherita Ligure. He learned to play the trumpet while in middle school and developed a passion for rap around the age of 14.

== Career ==
At the end of 2017, along with fellow Genoese artist Zero Vicious (former producer of Tedua and Vaz Tè) and others, Viacava formed the collective Luvre Muzik. In 2019, collaborating with members of Shank and Luvre Muzik, he released the self-published 25-track mixtape Sono triste – even though he later "disowned" this work. In 2020, he released Everyday Struggle, a mixtape written during the COVID-19 pandemic in Sesto San Giovanni, where he had moved aged 18 in hopes of achieving a breakthrough. Having failed to do so, he had moved back to Liguria shortly afterwards.

In 2024, Viacava established the Genovarabe collective alongside Helmi Sa7bi, Sossy, Marvin and Vincè, with whom he collaborated on several songs. Sayf gained nationwide fame in 2025, upon signing with ADA/Warner and releasing the EP Se Dio vuole and the singles "Pachamama" (with Rhove) and "Chanelina Soubrette" (with Disme and Ele A). He has also worked as a writer for Sugar Music. His first live performance was at Santeria Toscana 31 in Milan in April 2025. His single "Figli dei palazzi" (feat. Néza) peaked at number 53 on the Italian charts.

Sayf co-wrote Genoese rapper Bresh's song "Erica", from his June 2025 album Mediterraneo. The same month, his single "Sto bene al mare" – co-written and performed with Marco Mengoni and Rkomi – came out, charting at position 25. He was selected for Radar 2025, Spotify's program for emerging artists.

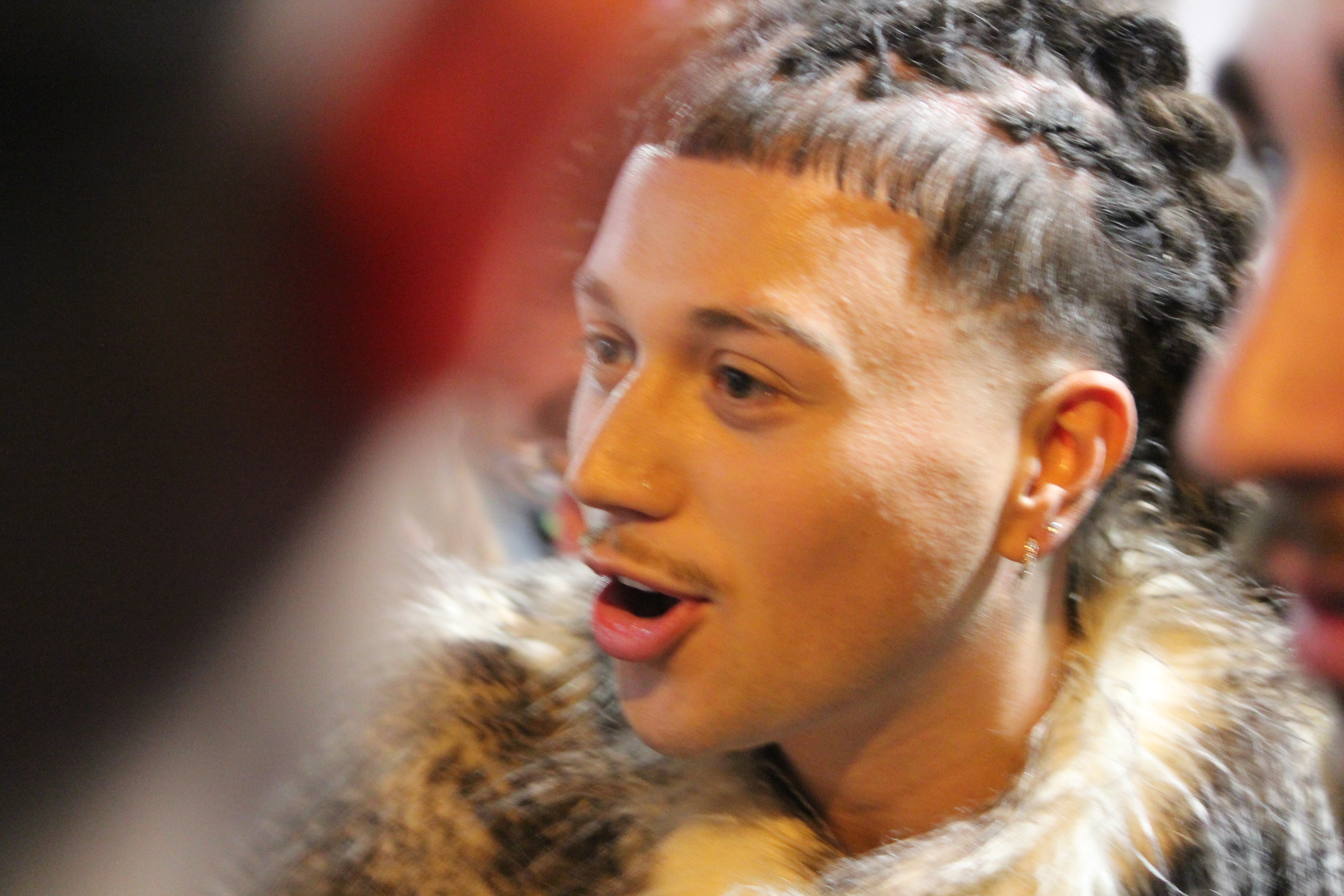
Sayf during the Sanremo 2026 week

On 30 November 2025, Sayf was announced among the participants of the Sanremo Music Festival 2026. He competed with the song "Tu mi piaci tanto", which finished second overall in the final of 28 February 2026. During the Sanremo week, he announced the Santissimo tour, held between June and October 2026 in several cities of Italy; the tour was anticipated by the release of the eponymous debut album and singles extracted from it. The Sanremo lead single peaked at number 2 on the Italian charts and was certified platinum, while the album topped the charts and received a gold certification. Both releases were also recognized at the BYD Music Awards in September 2026.

The following October, Sayf starred in the documentary Il cielo in una stanza, in which he meets inmates at Chiavari jail. On 10 November, his autobiography È costato mille fallimenti was published.

== Artistry and influences ==
Sayf's style has been described by publications like Rolling Stone and Billboard as fresher, freer and lighter compared to the dominant rap schemes both in his country and abroad. In addition to his double Tunisian–Genoese heritage, he has been influenced by samba, cumbia, trap and Italian melodic style; this has been observed in several songs featuring themes of introspection, nostalgia or love, as well as in tributes to artists including Gino Paoli, Adriano Celentano, Franco Califano and Vinicio Capossela. Viacava also claims influences from the music his father made him listen to as a child, which ranged from Fabrizio De André and PFM to Arab and Indian music.

As of 2026, Sayf's producers are Jiz and Dibla.

== Personal life ==
As of 2025, Sayf lives in Rapallo. He is a self-described "believer in his own way", practicing some cultural aspects of Islam. As of March 2026, he is in a relationship with dancer Bianca Genovese.

Sayf is a supporter of Genoa CFC, and has participated in the promotion of the club's jerseys.

== Discography ==
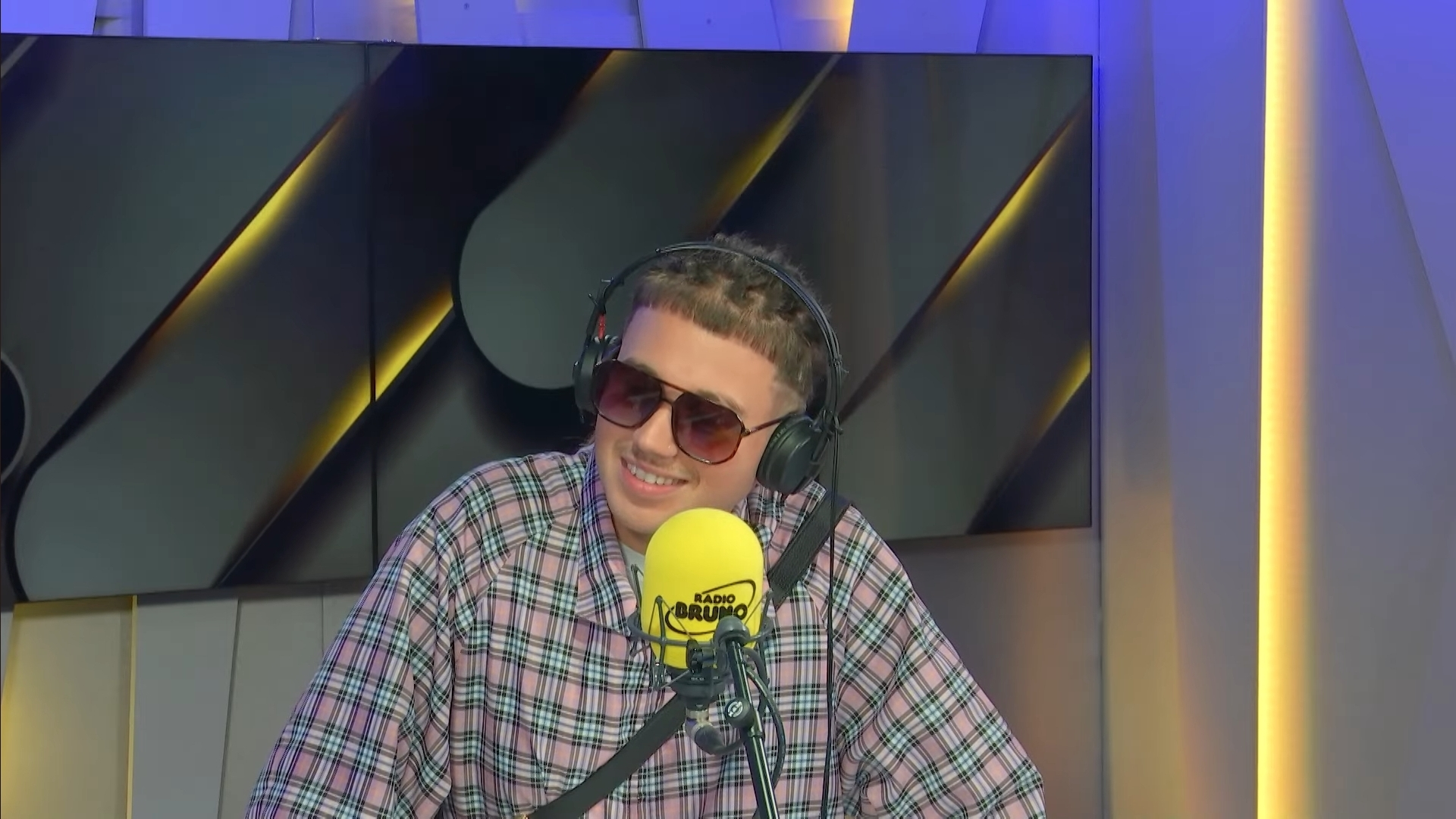
Sayf interviewed in May 2026

=== Studio albums ===
Title	Album details	Peak chart positions	Certifications
Title	Album details	ITA	Certifications
Santissimo	Release date: 7 May 2026; Label: Atlantic Records Italy / La Santa; Formats: CD, digital download, streaming	1	FIMI: Platinum

=== Extended plays ===
Title	Mixtape details	Peak chart positions
Title	Mixtape details	ITA
Se Dio vuole	Release date: 24 January 2025; Label: 2BE, ADA Music Italy; Formats: CD, digital download, streaming	26

=== Mixtapes ===
Title	Mixtape details
Sono triste (unofficial)	Release date: 15 April 2019; Label: Luvre Musik; Formats: CD, digital download, streaming
Everyday Struggle	Release date: 1 July 2020; Label: Warner Music Italy; Formats: CD, digital download, streaming

=== Singles ===
List of singles as lead artist, with selected chart positions, showing year released and album name
Title	Year	Peak chart positions		Certifications	Album, EP or mixtape
Title	Year	ITA	SWI	Certifications	Album, EP or mixtape
"Deep Side"	2017	—	—		Non-album singles
"Pigz"	2017	—	—		Non-album singles
"Sabbie di velluto"	2018	—	—		Sono triste
"Mumble" (feat. Gorka)	2019	—	—		Sono triste
"160streetZ (Ubriaco a marzo)"	2019	—	—		Sono triste
"Yves Saint Laurent" (feat. Gorka)	2019	—	—		Non-album singles
"Oh raga, bombe?" (feat. Guesan)	2019	—	—		Non-album singles
"1998 (Nessuno nasce odiando)"	2019	—	—		Everyday Struggle
"La santa" (feat. Nebbia)	2020	—	—		Non-album single
"Il ballo dello straniero"	2020	—	—		Everyday Struggle
"Prospettiva" (feat. Neoz 412)	2020	—	—		Non-album singles
"Telegiornale"	2021	—	—		Non-album singles
"¿Tito, che succ?" (feat. Zero Vicious)	2022	—	—		Non-album singles
"Satta Massagana"	2022	—	—		Non-album singles
"Una cotta per te"	2022	—	—		Non-album singles
"Come mai?"	2023	—	—		Non-album singles
"Peroperò"	2023	—	—		Non-album singles
"Nina"	2023	—	—		Non-album singles
"Mbappé"	2023	—	—		Non-album singles
"Gas"	2023	—	—		Non-album singles
"Stelle"	2024	—	—		Non-album singles
"Mio fratello" (feat. Helmi Sa7bi)	2024	—	—		Non-album singles
"Tr*p" (feat. Sgribaz)	2024	—	—		Non-album singles
"Genovarabe Freestyle" (feat. Helmi Sa7bi)	2024	—	—		Non-album singles
"Smokin' Hot"	2024	—	—		Non-album singles
"Tiroteo"	2024	—	—		Non-album singles
"Mia"	2024	—	—		Non-album singles
"Chanelina Soubrette" (feat. Disme & Ele A)	2024	—	—		Se Dio vuole
"Fortuna" (feat. 22simba)	2024	—	—		Se Dio vuole
"Facciamo metà"	2024	—	—		Se Dio vuole
"Soltanto se" (with Promessa)	2024	—	—		Danza del grano
"Marinè" (feat. Kuremino & Sethu)	2025	—	—		Se Dio vuole
"Se Dio vuole (Intro)"	2025	—	—		Se Dio vuole
"Pachamama" (feat. Rhove)	2025	—	—		Se Dio vuole
"Egoista"	2025	—	—		Se Dio vuole
"L'alba"	2025	—	—		Se Dio vuole
"Figli dei palazzi" (feat. Néza)	2025	53	—		Non-album singles
"Una Can"	2025	—	—		Non-album singles
"Money" (feat. Artie 5ive & Guè)	2025	21	—		Non-album singles
"Tu mi piaci tanto"	2026	2	37	FIMI: Platinum	Santissimo
"Buona domenica"	2026	28	—	FIMI: Gold	Santissimo
"Sex on la Santa"	2026	81	—		Santissimo
"Parlar d'amore" (feat. Bresh)	2026	55	—		Santissimo
"Top of the Pops (Red Bull 64 Bars)"	2026	—	—		Santissimo
"—" denotes a recording that did not chart or was not released in that territory.

==== As a featured artist ====
List of singles or charted songs as featured artist, with selected chart positions, showing year released and album name
Title	Year	Peak chart positions	Certifications	Album, EP or mixtape
Title	Year	ITA	Certifications	Album, EP or mixtape
"Bomboclaat" (Guesan feat. Sayf & Zero Vicious)	2018	—		Non-album single
"Berlino" (Guesan feat. Sayf & Reliz)	2019	—		Charlow Dalton (The Appetizer)
"Picasso & Kandinskij" (Tommi feat. Gorka & Sayf)	2019	—		Brutalité
"Fantasmi (Intro)" (Tommi feat. Sayf)	2019	—		Brutalité
"Fuori di testa" (Tommi feat. Sayf)	2019	—		Brutalité
"Vuoi stare calmo" (Zazza feat. Gorka & Sayf)	2019	—		Spartaco
"Proletari" (Zazza feat. Sayf)	2019	—		Spartaco
"L.D.C." (Zazza feat. Akwma & Sayf)	2019	—		Spartaco
"Le monde est à nous" (Guesan feat. Sayf & Zero Vicious)	2020	—		Non-album singles
"149 Chill" (Zero Vicious feat. Sayf, Jleeno & Patrick)	2020	—		Non-album singles
"Quarantena bis" (St Luca Spenish feat. Zero Vicious, Sayf & Guesan)	2020	—		Quarantena bis
"Jambo (43ena)" (MH & Hotsteppa feat. Sayf)	2020	—		40ena
"Full Immersion" (Plata feat. Sayf)	2020	—		Non-album singles
"Jamais vu" (Buio feat. Sayf)	2021	—		Non-album singles
"Bando" (Zero Vicious feat. Sayf & Jleeno)	2021	—		Luvre Musik Tape, Vol. 1
"Con te / con me" (Kiddo feat. Sayf & Zazza)	2021	—		Non-album single
"Ge hh" (Rupert feat. Sayf)	2021	—		Anima
"Cose preziose" (Guesan feat. Sayf)	2023	—		Novantaquattro Mixtape
"Gioia / Faraway" (Chryverde feat. Sayf)	2023	—		Des Îles
"Ammore (Portofino)" (Guesan feat. Sayf)	2024	—		Vietato morire
"Genovarabe" (Helmi Sa7bi feat. Sayf, Sossy & Vincè)	2024	—		Non-album single
"Il Doc 5" (VillaBanks, Guè & FT Kings feat. Sayf & Glocky)	2025	70		Quanto manca 2
"Players Club '25" (Night Skinny feat. Glocky, Rrari Dal Tacco, Promessa, Latrelle, Ele A, Sayf, Melons & Faneto)	2025	75		Non-album single
"2trap" (Helmi Sa7bi feat. Sayf)	2025	—		Les Misérables
"Maktoub" (Helmi Sa7bi feat. Sayf)	2025	—		Les Misérables
"Fuorilegge" (Disme feat. Sayf)	2025	—		Non-album single
"Erica" (Bresh feat. Sayf)	2025	77		Mediterraneo
"Sto bene al mare" (Marco Mengoni feat. Sayf & Rkomi)	2025	21	FIMI: Gold	Non-album single
"Vita divertida" (Medy feat. Sayf)	2025	—		Una vita non basta
"Testa o croce" (Sick Luke feat. Sayf)	2025	44		Dopamina
"Lamerica" (Sick Budd feat. Sayf & Johnny Marsiglia)	2025	—		Bistro!
"Buon esempio" (Ele A feat. Sayf & Promessa)	2025	—		Pixel
"Come ti pare" (Sethu feat. Sayf)	2025	—		In fiore
"Last Train 2 Shibuya" (Guè feat. Cookin Soul & Sayf)	2026	18		Fastlife 5: Audio Luxury
"Giovane e bello" (Tedua feat. Sayf)	2026	58		Ryan Ted
"Ne vale la pena" (22simba feat. Sayf)	2026	19		Miria
"Spiritualé" (Biagio Antonacci feat. Sayf)	2026	—		Mustang
"Libertà" (Fre_nky feat. Sayf)	2026	—		Non-album single
"—" denotes a recording that did not chart or was not released in that territory.

=== Other charted songs ===
List of othet charted songs as lead artist, with selected chart positions, showing year released and album name
Title	Year	Peak chart positions		Certifications	Album, EP or mixtape
Title	Year	ITA	SWI	Certifications	Album, EP or mixtape
"Ricordi" (feat. Geolier)	2026	29	—		Santissimo
"Salsa Maghreb"	2026	82	—		Santissimo
"F.I.$." (feat. Tedua)	2026	56	—		Santissimo
"Bratz" (feat. Nerissima Serpe)	2026	39	—		Santissimo
"Perché piango" (feat. Kid Yugi)	2026	25	—		Santissimo
"—" denotes a recording that did not chart or was not released in that territory.

== Filmography ==
Year	Title	Role	Notes
2026	Il cielo in una stanza	Himself	Documentary

== Bibliography ==
- È costato mille fallimenti (in Italian). Mondadori Electa. 10 November 2026. ISBN 9788891849069.
