= Tutto tranne questo =

Single by Irama

from the album Antologia della vita e della morte
- Released: 16 January 2026
- Genre: Power ballad
- Length: 2:42
- Label: Warner Music Italy
- Songwriters: Filippo Maria Fanti; Giuseppe Colonnelli; Jacopo Lazzarini; Rene Cano
- Composers: Alessandro Merli; Fabio Clemente; Giulio Nenna; Jacopo Lazzarini; Pierfrancesco Pasini; Rene Cano
- Producers: DB; Giulio Nenna

Irama singles chronology
"Senz'anima" (2025)	"Tutto tranne questo" (2026)	"Cabana" (2026)

Music video
- "Tutto tranne questo" on YouTube

"Tutto tranne questo" (transl. Anything but this) is a song by Italian singer-songwriter Irama. It was released on 16 January 2026 by Warner Music Italy as the sixth single from the fifth studio album, Antologia della vita e della morte.

== Description ==
The song, an intense and sincere power ballad written by the singer-songwriter himself with Giuseppe Colonnelli, Jacopo Lazzarini, aka Lazza, and Rene Cano, was produced by Andrea "DB" Debernardi and Giulio Nenna. It addresses the moment when a relationship reaches its inevitable end.

== Promotion ==
Originally released on 17 October 2025, as the fifth track from the album Antologia della vita e della morte, the song was made available as a single for radio rotation on 16 January 2026. On 19 October the singer-songwriter performed the song during the fourth afternoon episode of the twenty-fifth edition of the talent show Amici di Maria De Filippi.

== Music video ==
The visual video, directed by Amedeo Zancanella, was released on 17 October 2025, on the Irama's YouTube channel.

== Charts ==
Weekly chart performance for "Tutto tranne questo"
Chart (2025)	Peak position
Italy (FIMI)	34
