= No Stress (Irama and Rkomi album) =

Studio album by Irama and Rkomi
- Released: 7 July 2023
- Genre: Pop rap
- Length: 33:40
- Label: Atlantic; Island
- Producer: Corredor; Cromatico; Cucina Sonora; Eydren; Giulio Nenna; Junior K; Luca Faraone; Robert Ner; Shablo; Shune; Takagi & Ketra; Zor Beats

Irama chronology
Il giorno in cui ho smesso di pensare (2022)	No Stress (2023)	Antologia della vita e della morte (2025)

Rkomi chronology
Taxi Driver (2021)	No Stress (2023)	Decrescendo (2025)

Singles from No Stress
- 1. "Hollywood" Released: 9 June 2023; 2. "Sulla pelle" Released: 1 September 2023

No Stress is a collaborative studio album by Italian singer-songwriter Irama and rapper Rkomi, released on 7 July 2023 by Atlantic and Island.

== Composition ==
The record project is the artists' first released together, following Rkomi's solo projects Taxi Driver and Irama's Il giorno in cui ho smesso di pensare. The album features the collaboration of numerous songwriters and producers, including Takagi & Ketra, Shablo, Guè and Ernia. In an interview with Rolling Stone Italia, Irama talked about the creative process behind the project and the meaning of the album:

"We were coming from a time when things were going well, our respective records were going well, we were happy with the results not only in terms of numbers, but also of the perception by people. This, as often happens, had created expectations and tension, and we wanted to exorcise them by naming the album No Stress. The album photographs a moment we lived together in Los Angeles, where we found ourselves. The writing also happened naturally because of the sharing of travel, homes and musicians made No Stress come to life before there was already the idea of working on a record together."

In the same interview, Rkomi explained the album artwork and the decision of the title:

"No Stress is a way to remind me to stay calm and to experience this project with tranquility, also because it was born very light, fast and with an international approach. [...] We wanted to represent the title and we wanted to convey the feeling of claustrophobia that we felt. And so, we are inside this car with beautiful girls inside. It's the other side of the coin, it explains how much we like this stress. We make fun of it, we downplay it."on a record together."

== Critic reception ==
Fabio Fiume of All Music Italia gave the project a score of 6.75, writing that although the duo appears to be "one of the least likely pairs" for a shared record project, this "objectively really sounds like the result of a good friendship, a real acquaintance," calling it "enjoyable and expendable." Fiume stressed that the production work turns out to be "impeccable," although no real instruments are heard, tending in some tracks to emulate Blanco or Clementino.

Marco Macchi of Newsic wrote that in the project the two artists managed to "merge while keeping their sound matrices and characteristics intact," making an album with "a sense and credibility," although there are tracks with "hit propensities" that are less successful overall. Claudio Cabona of Rockol described the project as "light and summery," finding in it numerous musical references, including "[music] from the 1980s to the multi-layered sound of Drake, and new-generation international pop, passing through Italian singer-songwriting and some Latin influences," describing it as a "playful experiment" that nevertheless will not remain "in the history of rap and pop."

== Track listing ==
No Stress track listing
No.	Title	Writer(s)	Producers	Length
1.	"Hollywood" (featuring Shablo)	Mirko Martorana; Filippo Maria Fanti; Pablo Miguel Lombroni Capalbo; Giuseppe Colonnelli; Michele Corvino	Shablo	3:05
2.	"Sexy" (featuring Guè)	Martorana; Fanti; Colonnelli; Corvino; Cosimo Fini	Robert Ner	2:36
3.	"Quando piove"	Martorana; Fanti; Lombroni Capalbo; Colonnelli; Corvino; Luca Faraone	Shablo; Faraone	3:52
4.	"Sulla pelle"	Martorana; Fanti; Colonnelli; Corvino; Giacomo Pasutto; Giulio Nenna; Umberto Odoguardi	Cromatico; Nenna; Junior K	2:50
5.	"Gravità"	Martorana; Fanti; Colonnelli; Corvino; Nenna; Pietro Spinelli	Cucina Sonora; Nenna	2:25
6.	"Petrolio"	Martorana; Fanti; Colonnelli; Nenna; Adrián Sánchez	Eydren; Nenna	3:59
7.	"Un'altra bugia"	Martorana; Fanti; Colonnelli; Odoguardi; Alessio Buongiorno	Junior K	3:04
8.	"Urlami addosso"	Martorana; Fanti; Colonnelli; Corvino; Odoguardi; Luca Ghiazzi	Junior K; Shune	3:16
9.	"Precipito"	Martorana; Fanti; Colonnelli; Corvino; Alessandro Merli; Fabio Clemente	Takagi & Ketra	3:09
10.	"Con gli stessi occhi"	Martorana; Fanti; Colonnelli; Faraone; Lombroni Capalbo	Shablo; Faraone	2:52
11.	"Figlio unico" (featuring Ernia and Kid Yugi)	Martorana; Fanti; Matteo Professione; Francesco Stasi	Corredor; Zor Beats; Nenna	4:05
Total length:				33:40

== Charts ==
Chart (2023)	Peak position
Italian Albums (FIMI)	2

== Certifications ==
Certifications for No Stress
Region	Certification	Certified units/sales
Italy (FIMI)	Platinum	50,000^{‡}
^{‡} Sales+streaming figures based on certification alone.
