= Ovunque sarai =

Single by Irama

from the album Il giorno in cui ho smesso di pensare
- Language: Italian
- Released: 3 February 2022
- Length: 3:29
- Label: Warner
- Composers: Irama; Shablo; Giulio Nenna; Luca Faraone
- Lyricists: Irama; Giuseppe Colonnelli
- Producers: Shablo; Giulio Nenna; Luca Faraone

Irama singles chronology
"Luna piena" (2021)	"Ovunque sarai" (2022)	"5 gocce" (2022)

Music video
- "Ovunque sarai" on YouTube

"Ovunque sarai" ("Wherever you will be") is a song by Italian singer-songwriter Irama, released by Warner on 3 February 2022 as the first single from the third studio album Il giorno in cui ho smesso di pensare. It was written by Irama, Giuseppe Colonnelli, Shablo, Giulio Nenna, and Luca Faraone.

The song competed in the Sanremo Music Festival 2022, placing 4th.

== Music video ==
A music video of "Ovunque sarai", directed by Enea Colombi, was released on 3 February 2022 via Irama's YouTube channel. It was shot in Podenzano.

== Charts ==
=== Weekly charts ===
Chart performance for "Ovunque sarai"
Chart (2022)	Peak position
Italy (FIMI)	2
Italy Airplay (EarOne)	6
Switzerland (Schweizer Hitparade)	11

=== Year-end charts ===
Year-end chart performance for "Ovunque sarai"
Chart (2022)	Position
Italy (FIMI)	15

== Certifications ==
Certifications for "Ovunque sarai"
Region	Certification	Certified units/sales
Italy (FIMI)	4× Platinum	400,000^{‡}
^{‡} Sales+streaming figures based on certification alone.
