= La genesi del tuo colore =

Single by Irama
- Released: 4 March 2021
- Genre: Dance-pop; electropop
- Length: 3:48
- Label: Warner Music Italy
- Composers: Filippo Maria Fanti; Dario Faini; Giulio Nenna
- Lyricists: Filippo Maria Fanti; Dario Faini; Giulio Nenna
- Producers: Dardust; Giulio Nenna

Irama singles chronology
"Ragazzi della nebbia" (2020)	"La genesi del tuo colore" (2021)	"Melodia proibita" (2021)

Music video
- "La genesi del tuo colore" on YouTube

"La genesi del tuo colore" (lit. 'The genesis of your color') is a song by Italian singer-songwriter Irama. It was released on 4 March 2021 through Warner Music Italy.

The song premiered on the second evening of the Sanremo Music Festival 2021 and it ranked fifth at the end of the competition.

== Composition ==
The song was written by the artist himself with Dario Faini and Giulio Nenna, both also producer of the trak. In an interview for Rockol Irama explained the meaning of the song and its writing process:

"The lyrics of the song can be encapsulated in one sentence, it is definitely a hymn to life, a celebration of life. It is up-tempo, so it is an upbeat song, there is so much spirit in it, so much naturalness, so much sincerity and total freedom. On the other hand, there is also a melancholic vein that strongly characterises it. 'La genesi del tuo colore' is a song that was born a cappella: it was born from a vibration, from a feeling. [...] I went and knocked on Dardust's door and then he welcomed me with open arms and we found ourselves in this sort of 'artistic marriage'. It is a marriage of two worlds: there is an orchestral world and an electronic world. These two worlds converge in the same place to generate this power, this energy. [...] In the track you can hear Dardust's hand but at the same time there is also a lot of mine. This made it possible to create something a bit unique, a meeting of several artists. It was very sincere and real."

== Participation in the Sanremo Music Festival ==
The song was originally supposed to be presented during the first date of the festival, but after one of the artist's collaborators tested positive for the COVID-19 virus, the presentation was postponed until the following evening. The artist was replaced by the singer Noemi, who performed her competition song "Glicine". Despite the singer's negative test result, another contributor tested positive for the virus the following day, forcing the entire Irama staff to undergo a compulsory two-week quarantine, as required by the COVID-19 containment measures in Italy. Given the rules of the event, the artist should have withdrawn from the festival but, thanks to the intervention of Amadeus, presenter and artistic director of Sanremo 2021, Irama was allowed to participate by airing the performance of the song during the general rehearsal on stage.

== Music video ==
The music video for "La genesi del tuo colore", directed by Gianluigi Carella, was released after the Sanremo premiere via Irama's YouTube channel. It was recorded at the Autodromo Nazionale di Monza, in the city where Irama grew up.

== Charts ==
=== Weekly charts ===
Chart (2021)	Peak position
Italy (FIMI)	3
Switzerland (Schweizer Hitparade)	75

=== Year-end charts ===
Chart (2021)	Position
Italy (FIMI)	20

== Certifications ==
Region	Certification	Certified units/sales
Italy (FIMI)	3× Platinum	210,000^{‡}
^{‡} Sales+streaming figures based on certification alone.
