= Mediterranea (song) =

Single by Irama

from the EP Crepe
- Released: 19 May 2020
- Genre: Reggaeton; dance
- Length: 2:57
- Label: Warner Music Italy
- Songwriters: Filippo Maria Fanti; Federica Abbate; Giuseppe Colonnelli
- Composers: Filippo Maria Fanti; Andrea "DB" Debernardi; Giulio Nenna
- Producers: Andrea "DB" Debernardi; Giulio Nenna

Irama singles chronology
"Milano" (2020)	"Mediterranea" (2020)	"Crepe" (2020)

Music video
- "Mediterranea" on YouTube

"Mediterranea" (transl. Mediterranean) is a song by Italian singer-songwriter Irama. It was released on 19 May 2020 by Warner Music Italy as the second single from the second EP Crepe.

== Music video ==
The music video, directed by Gianluigi Carella and made in Rome, was released on the same day via Irama's YouTube channel.

== Charts ==
=== Weekly charts ===
Weekly chart performance for "Mediterranea"
Chart (2020)	Peak position
Italy (FIMI)	1
Italy Airplay (EarOne)	1
Switzerland (Schweizer Hitparade)	92

=== Year-end charts ===
2020 year-end chart performance for "Mediterranea"
Chart (2020)	Position
Italy (FIMI)	3

2021 year-end chart performance for "Mediterranea"
Chart (2021)	Position
Italy (FIMI)	82

== Certifications ==
Certifications for "Mediterranea"
Region	Certification	Certified units/sales
Italy (FIMI)	5× Platinum	350,000^{‡}
^{‡} Sales+streaming figures based on certification alone.
