= Lentamente (Irama song) =

Single by Irama

from the album Antologia della vita e della morte
- Language: Italian
- Released: 12 February 2025
- Genre: Pop rock
- Length: 3:26
- Label: Warner Music Italy
- Songwriters: Filippo Maria Fanti; Riccardo Fabbriconi; Giuseppe Colonnelli; Michele Zocca
- Producer: Michelangelo

Irama singles chronology
"Galassie" (2024)	"Lentamente" (2025)	"Ex" (2025)

Music video
- "Lentamente" on YouTube

"Lentamente" ("Slowly") is a 2025 song by Italian singer-songwriter Irama, released by Warner Music Italy on 12 February 2025 as the third single from the fifth studio album, Antologia della vita e della morte. It was written by the singer himself with Blanco, Giuseppe Colonnelli and Michelangelo, and produced by Michelangelo.

The song competed in the Sanremo Music Festival 2025, placing 9th.

== Music video ==
A music video of "Lentamente", directed by Francesco Lorusso, was released on 12 February 2025 via Irama's YouTube channel. It was shot in Villastellone and also features actress Nina Malara.

== Charts ==
=== Weekly charts ===
Chart performance for "Lentamente"
Chart (2025)	Peak position
Italy (FIMI)	12
Italy Airplay (EarOne)	21
Switzerland (Schweizer Hitparade)	57

=== Year-end charts ===
Year-end chart performance for "Lentamente"
Chart (2025)	Position
Italy (FIMI)	55

== Certifications ==
Certifications for "Lentamente"
Region	Certification	Certified units/sales
Italy (FIMI)	Gold	100,000^{‡}
^{‡} Sales+streaming figures based on certification alone.
