= 5 gocce =

Single by Irama featuring Rkomi

from the album Il giorno in cui ho smesso di pensare
- Language: Italian
- Released: 25 March 2022
- Genre: Dance-pop
- Length: 2:40
- Label: Warner Music Italy
- Songwriters: Filippo Maria Fanti; Mirko Martorana; Giuseppe Colonnelli; Luis Jonuel Gonzalez Maldonado; Junior K; Mr. Naisgai
- Producers: Junior L; Mr. Naisgai

Irama singles chronology
"Ovunque sarai" (2022)	"5 gocce" (2022)	"Pam Pam Pam Pam Pam Pam Pam Pam" (2022)

Rkomi singles chronology
"Insuperabile" (2022)	"5 gocce" (2022)	"Parli di me" (2022)

Music video
- "5 gocce" on YouTube

"5 gocce" (lit. '5 drops') is a song by Italian singer-songwriter Irama with featured vocals by rapper Rkomi. It was released on 25 March 2022 by Warner Music Italy as the second single from the third studio album Il giorno in cui ho smesso di pensare. The title is a double reference to tears and drops of Lexotan.

== Music video ==
The music video for "5 gocce", directed by LateMilk, was released on 5 April 2022 via Irama's YouTube channel.

== Charts ==
=== Weekly charts ===
Chart (2022)	Peak position
Italy (FIMI)	3
Italy Airplay (EarOne)	3

=== Year-end charts ===
Chart (2022)	Peak position
Italy (FIMI)	8

== Certifications ==
Region	Certification	Certified units/sales
Italy (FIMI)	5× Platinum	500,000^{‡}
^{‡} Sales+streaming figures based on certification alone.
