= Shablo =

Argentinian-Italian disc jockey and music producer

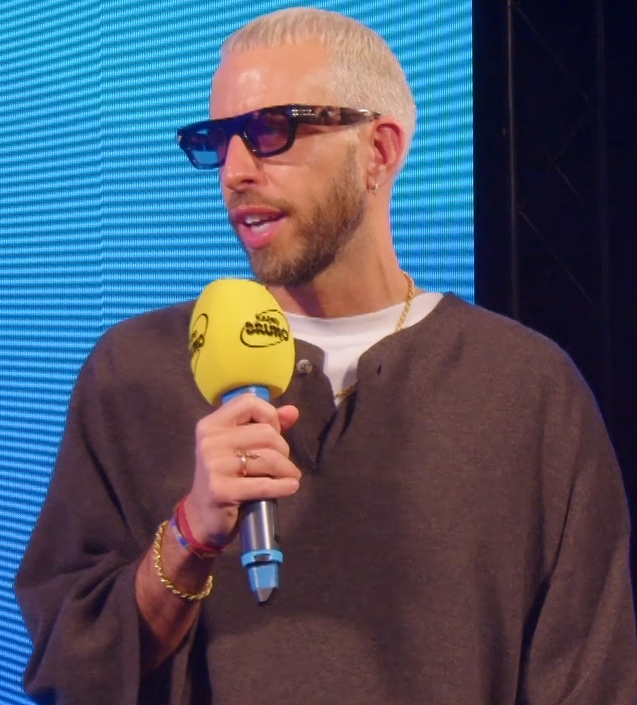
- Shablo in February 2025

Background information
- Born: Pablo Miguel Lombroni Capalbo; 17 November 1980 (age 45); Buenos Aires, Argentina
- Genres: Hip hop; trap; R&B; hip hop soul; neo soul
- Occupations: Disc jockey; songwriter; record producer
- Years active: 2001–present
- Labels: Roccia Music; Thaurus Records

Pablo Miguel Lombroni Capalbo (born Buenos Aires, 17 November 1980), known professionally as Shablo, is an Argentinian-Italian DJ and music producer. He currently lives in Perugia.

== Life and career ==
Born in Buenos Aires in 1980 from an Italian family, he moved to Perugia in 1988, where he discovered hip-hop and developed as a DJ producer. In 2001, he produced 5º Dan by Inoki and joined the Porzione Massiccia Crew. He collaborated with Club Dogo and took part in PMC VS Club Dogo - The Official Mixtape (2004), later becoming part of the producer team The Italian Job.

In 2008, Shablo released his debut album The Second Feeling, followed by Thori & Rocce with Don Joe in 2011. As the founder of Roccia Music with Marracash, he released Mate y espíritu in 2016.

In 2005 he moved to Amsterdam and continued his career working in the Dutch music scene.

He was chosen as the official artist for Nokia Trendslab, touring with them for a year alongside Justice, Duran Duran and Wu-Tang Clan.

Together with Marracash he founded the rap collective and music label "Roccia Music" in 2013. Through this, the compilation album Genesi was released in 2014, featuring artists such as Achille Lauro, Fred de Palma, Jake La Furia, and Guè.

In 2025, he competed at the Sanremo Music Festival with "La mia parola", featuring Guè, Joshua and Tormento. They placed 18th in the contest. On the fourth night of the festival, they performed covers of the songs "Aspettando il sole" by Neffa, and "Amor de mi vida" by Sottotono, performing alongside Neffa.

== Discography ==
=== Studio albums ===
Title	Album details	Peak chart positions
Title	Album details	ITA
The Second Feeling	Released: 21 May 2008; Label: Barely Legal; Format: CD, digital download	—
Thori & Rocce (with Don Joe)	Released: 14 June 2011; Label: Universal; Format: CD, LP, digital download, streaming	6
Mate y espíritu	Released: 22 January 2016; Label: Avantguardia; Format: CD, digital download, streaming	—
Manifesto	Released: 4 July 2025; Label: Universal; Format: CD, LP, digital download, streaming	28

=== Extended plays ===
Title	Album details
Thori & Rocce Remix EP (with Don Joe)	Released: 7 February 2012; Label: Universal; Format: digital download

=== Singles ===
==== As lead artist ====
Title	Year	Peak chart positions	Certifications	Album
Title	Year	ITA	Certifications	Album
"Le leggende non muoiono mai" (with Don Joe featuring Fabri Fibra, Jake La Furia, Noyz Narcos, Marracash, Guè, J-Ax and Francesco Sarcina)	2011	68		Thori & Rocce
"L'ultimo giorno che ho" (with Don Joe featuring Deleterio and Marracash)	2011	—		Thori & Rocce
"Get Loose"	2013	—		Non-album singles
"La strada per la felicità" (with Tormento)	2014	—		Non-album singles
"Non ci sto" (with Marracash and Carl Brave)	2019	7	FIMI: Platinum	Non-album singles
"Kriminal" (featuring Gemitaiz, Samurai Jay and Guè)	2020	—		Non-album singles
"Pimper's Paradise" (featuring Tommy Dali)	2020	—		Non-album singles
"Three Little Birds" (with Elisa)	2020	—		Non-album singles
"M' manc" (with Geolier and Sfera Ebbasta)	2020	1	FIMI: 6× Platinum	Non-album singles
"Too Old to Die Young" (with Guè)	2021	—		Guesus
"Luna piena" (with Rkomi and Irama)	2021	12	FIMI: 5× Platinum	Taxi Driver
"Come i grandi" (with Tommy Dali)	2021	—		Non-album singles
"Cuore" (with Coez and Geolier)	2022	—		Non-album singles
"Hollywood" (with Irama and Rkomi)	2023	17	FIMI: 2× Platinum	No Stress
"Cold" (with Joshua)	2024	—		Non-album singles
"Lose Control" (with Ste)	2024	—		Non-album singles
"Hope" (with Izi and Joshua)	2024	—		Non-album singles
"La mia parola" (featuring Guè, Joshua and Tormento)	2025	7	FIMI: Gold	Manifesto
"Spirito libero" (featuring Guè, Joshua and Tormento)	2025	—		Manifesto

==== As featured artist ====
Title	Year	Peak chart positions	Certifications	Album
Title	Year	ITA	Certifications	Album
"Je ne sais pas" (Lous and the Yakuza featuring Sfera Ebbasta and Shablo)	2021	3	FIMI: Gold	Non-album singles
"Ti amo, ti odio" (Roshelle featuring Guè, Shablo and Mecna)	2021	—		Non-album singles

=== Guest appearances ===
Title	Year	Other artist(s)	Album
"La mia medicina"	2008	Tormento, El Presidente	Siamesi Brothers
"Ama (Ciò che sei)"	2013	Noà, Madbuddy	Drop of Me
"Dai dai dai"	2016	J-Ax, Don Joe	J-Ax & Friends
"Sono luce"	2020	Random	Montagne russe (Extended)
"Eroi"	2020	Samurai Jay	Lacrime
"25 ore"	2020	Guè, Ernia	Mr. Fini
"Ultimi giorni (Shablo RMX)"	2021	Guè	Il ragazzo d'oro - 10 anni dopo
"Luna piena - MTV Unplugged"	2021	Rkomi, Irama	Taxi Driver (MTV Unplugged)
"Una cosa sola"	2022	Irama	Il giorno in cui ho smesso di pensare
"Ex angelo"	2024	Kid Yugi, Sfera Ebbasta	I nomi del diavolo

== Production discography ==
Song title, original artist, album of release, and year of release
Title	Year	Arist(s)	Album
"Rob Zombie" (featuring Noyz Narcos)	2013	Salmo	Midnite
"Ordinaria follia" (featuring The Navigator)	2013	Salmo	Midnite
"Alfa Alfa"	2013	Noyz Narcos	Monster
"Rome Calling" (featuring Fetz Darko)	2013	Noyz Narcos	Monster
"'O vient"	2013	Clementino	Mea culpa
"Questa volta" (featuring Fabri Fibra)	2013	Clementino	Mea culpa
"Mea culpa" (featuring Meg)	2013	Clementino	Mea culpa
"Fratello" (featuring Jovanotti)	2013	Clementino	Mea culpa
"Buenos Aires/Napoli" (featuring Negrita)	2013	Clementino	Mea culpa
"Sei come sei" (featuring Ntò and Gigi Finizio)	2013	Clementino	Mea culpa
"Messaggeri del Vesuvio"	2013	Clementino	Mea culpa
"Cos cos cos"	2015	Clementino	Miracolo!
"Da che parte stai?" (featuring Pino Daniele)	2015	Clementino	Miracolo!
"Voceanima"	2015	Clementino	Miracolo!
"Notte"	2015	Clementino	Miracolo!
"Sotto le stelle"	2015	Clementino	Miracolo!
"Inchiostro"	2015	Clementino	Miracolo!
"Con me"	2016	Izi	Fenice
"Trafitto" (featuring Moses Sangare)	2016	Izi	Fenice
"Odi"	2016	Izi	Fenice
"Scusa" (featuring Moses Sangare)	2016	Izi	Fenice
"Chic"	2016	Izi	Fenice
"Niente da perdere"	2016	Izi	Fenice
"Black Widow"	2016	Salmo	Hellvisback
"Santeria"	2016	Marracash and Guè	Santeria
"Film senza volume"	2016	Marracash and Guè	Santeria
"Erba & Wi-fi"	2016	Marracash and Guè	Santeria
"Cenere"	2017	Clementino	Vulcano
"Ragazzi fuori"	2017	Clementino	Vulcano
"Deserto"	2017	Clementino	Vulcano
"Spartanapoli"	2017	Clementino	Vulcano
"Lascia stare"	2017	Fabri Fibra	Fenomeno
"Pianto"	2017	Izi	Pizzicato
"Na Na Na"	2017	Izi	Pizzicato
"Tutto torna"	2017	Izi	Pizzicato
"Dopo esco" (featuring Fabri Fibra)	2017	Izi	Pizzicato
"Come me" (featuring Enzo Dong)	2017	Izi	Pizzicato
"Mai più"	2017	Rkomi	Io in terra
"Origami"	2017	Rkomi	Io in terra
"Peaky Blinders"	2017	Rkomi	Io in terra
"4Z"	2017	Rkomi	Io in terra
"Pem Pem"	2018	Elettra Lamborghini	Twerking Queen
"Per un pungo di emozioni"	2018	Rkomi	Ossigeno - EP
"Domani"	2018	Ernia	68
"Bastardi senza gloria" (featuring Noyz Narcos)	2018	Guè	Sinatra
"Bam Bam" (featuring Cosculluela and El Micha)	2018	Guè	Sinatra
"Sobrio" (featuring Elodie)	2018	Guè	Sinatra
"Hotel"	2018	Guè	Sinatra
"Cose che capitano"	2019	Rkomi	Dove gli occhi non arrivano
"Pegaditos"	2019	Elettra Lamborghini	Twerking Queen
"Maldito día"	2019	Elettra Lamborghini	Twerking Queen
"25 ore"	2020	Guè	Mr. Fini
"Eroi"	2020	Samurai Jay	Lacrime
"Mami papi"	2021	Madame	Madame
"Diecimilavoci" (with Ariete)	2021	Rkomi	Taxi Driver
"Luna piena" (with Irama)	2021	Rkomi	Taxi Driver
"Paradiso vs. Inferno (interlude)" (with Roshelle)	2021	Rkomi	Taxi Driver
"Mare che non sei" (with Gaia)	2021	Rkomi	Taxi Driver
"Cancelli di mezzanotte" (with Chiello)	2021	Rkomi	Taxi Driver
"Taxi Driver"	2021	Rkomi	Taxi Driver
"Je ne sais pas" (featuring Sfera Ebbasta)	2021	Lous and the Yakuza	Non-album single
"Gangster of Love" (featuring Rick Ross)	2021	Guè	Guesus
"Too Old to Die Young"	2021	Guè	Guesus
"Scatola"	2022	Laura Pausini	Non-album single
"Like I Want You"	2022	Elisa	Ritorno al futuro/Back to the Future
"Baby - Capitolo XI"	2022	Irama	Il giorno in cui ho smesso di pensare
"Yo quiero amarte"	2022	Irama	Il giorno in cui ho smesso di pensare
"Una cosa sola"	2022	Irama	Il giorno in cui ho smesso di pensare
"Goodbye"	2022	Irama	Il giorno in cui ho smesso di pensare
"Ovunque sarai"	2022	Irama	Il giorno in cui ho smesso di pensare
"Bastava la metà" (featuring Gaia and Guè)	2022	Ernia	Io non ho paura
"Chiudi gli occhi"	2023	Guè	Madreperla
"Fatti rimandare dalla mamma a prendere il latte"	2023	Gianni Morandi and Sangiovanni	Evviva!
"Il bene nel male"	2023	Madame	L'amore
"Quanto forte ti pensavo"	2023	Madame	L'amore
"Nimpha - La storia di una ninfomane"	2023	Madame	L'amore
"Il mio nuovo maestro"	2023	Madame	L'amore
"Donna vedi"	2023	Madame	L'amore
"Respirare"	2023	Madame	L'amore
"Milagro - A Matilde"	2023	Madame	L'amore
"Se non provo dolore"	2023	Madame	L'amore
"Hollywood"	2023	Irama and Rkomi	No Stress
"Quando piove"	2023	Irama and Rkomi	No Stress
"Con gli stessi occhi"	2023	Irama and Rkomi	No Stress
"Caffè e lacrime"	2023	Roshelle	Non-album single
"Ex-Angelo" (featuring Sfera Ebbasta)	2024	Kid Yugi	I nomi del diavolo
"Dirti no"	2025	Rkomi	Decrescendo
"Non c'è amore" (featuring Lazza)	2025	Rkomi	Decrescendo
"Senza di te"	2025	Rkomi	Decrescendo
"Interferenze"	2025	Rkomi	Decrescendo
"Veleno" (featuring Ernia)	2025	Rkomi	Decrescendo
"Inerludio"	2025	Rkomi	Decrescendo
"10 secondi" (featuring Nayt)	2025	Rkomi	Decrescendo
"Oh Gio"	2025	Rkomi	Decrescendo
"Promessa"	2025	Rkomi	Decrescendo
"Solo gli amanti sopravvivono"	2025	Rkomi	Decrescendo
"Il ritmo delle cose"	2025	Rkomi	Decrescendo
"Così piccoli"	2025	Rkomi	Decrescendo
