= Tu no =

Single by Irama

from the album Antologia della vita e della morte
- Language: Italian
- Released: 7 February 2024
- Length: 3:35
- Label: Warner Music Italy
- Songwriters: Filippo Maria Fanti; Giulio Nenna; Emanuele Mattozzi; Francesco Monti; Giuseppe Colonnelli
- Producer: Giulio Nenna

Irama singles chronology
"Sulla pelle" (2023)	"Tu no" (2024)	"Galassie" (2024)

Music video
- "Tu no" on YouTube

"Tu no" (transl. "Not you") is a song by Italian singer Irama. It was written by Filippo Maria Fanti, Giulio Nenna, Emanuele Mattozzi, Francesco Monti and Giuseppe Colonnelli, and released on 7 February 2024 as the first single from the fifth studio album, Antologia della vita e della morte.

The song was Irama's entry for the Sanremo Music Festival 2024, the 74th edition of Italy's musical festival which doubles also as a selection of the act for the Eurovision Song Contest, where it placed fifth in the grand final.

== Music video ==
A music video to accompany the release of "Tu no" was first released onto YouTube on 7 February 2024. The video was produced by DeAntartica and shot on various locations in Sicily.

== Charts ==
=== Weekly charts ===
Weekly chart performance for "Tu no"
Chart (2024)	Peak position
Italy (FIMI)	5
Switzerland (Schweizer Hitparade)	16

=== Year-end charts ===
2024 year-end chart performance for "Tu no"
Chart (2024)	Position
Italy (FIMI)	20

== Certifications ==
Certifications for "Tu no"
Region	Certification	Certified units/sales
Italy (FIMI)	2× Platinum	200,000^{‡}
^{‡} Sales+streaming figures based on certification alone.
