= La ragazza con il cuore di latta =

Single by Irama

from the album Giovani per sempre
- Language: Italian
- Released: 6 February 2019
- Genre: Pop rap
- Length: 3:42
- Label: Warner
- Composers: Filippo Maria Fanti; Andrea Debernardi; Giulio Nenna
- Lyricists: Filippo Maria Fanti; Giuseppe Colonnelli
- Producers: Andrea Debernardi; Giulio Nenna

Irama singles chronology
"Bella e rovinata" (2018)	"La ragazza con il cuore di latta" (2019)	"Arrogante" (2019)

Music video
- "La ragazza con il cuore di latta" on YouTube

"La ragazza con il cuore di latta" (transl. "The girl with the tin heart") is a song by Italian singer-songwriter Irama. It was written by Irama, Giuseppe Colonnelli, Andrea Debernardi and Giulio Nenna and released on 6 February 2019.

The song was Irama's entry for the Sanremo Music Festival 2019, the 69th edition of Italy's musical festival which doubled also as a selection of the act for the Eurovision Song Contest, where it placed seventh in the grand final.

== Music video ==
A music video to accompany the release of "La ragazza con il cuore di latta" was first released onto YouTube on 6 February 2019. The video was directed by Matteo Martinez, starring the actress Demetra Bellina in the role of Linda.

== Charts ==
=== Weekly charts ===
Weekly chart performance for "La ragazza con il cuore di latta"
Chart (2019)	Peak position
Italy (FIMI)	3
Italy Airplay (EarOne)	26
Switzerland (Schweizer Hitparade)	58

=== Year-end charts ===
Year-end chart performance for "La ragazza con il cuore di latta"
Chart (2019)	Position
Italy (FIMI)	46

== Certifications ==
Certifications for "La ragazza con il cuore di latta"
Region	Certification	Certified units/sales
Italy (FIMI)	2× Platinum	100,000^{‡}
^{‡} Sales+streaming figures based on certification alone.
