= Elettra Lamborghini =

Italian television personality, singer and influencer (born 1994)

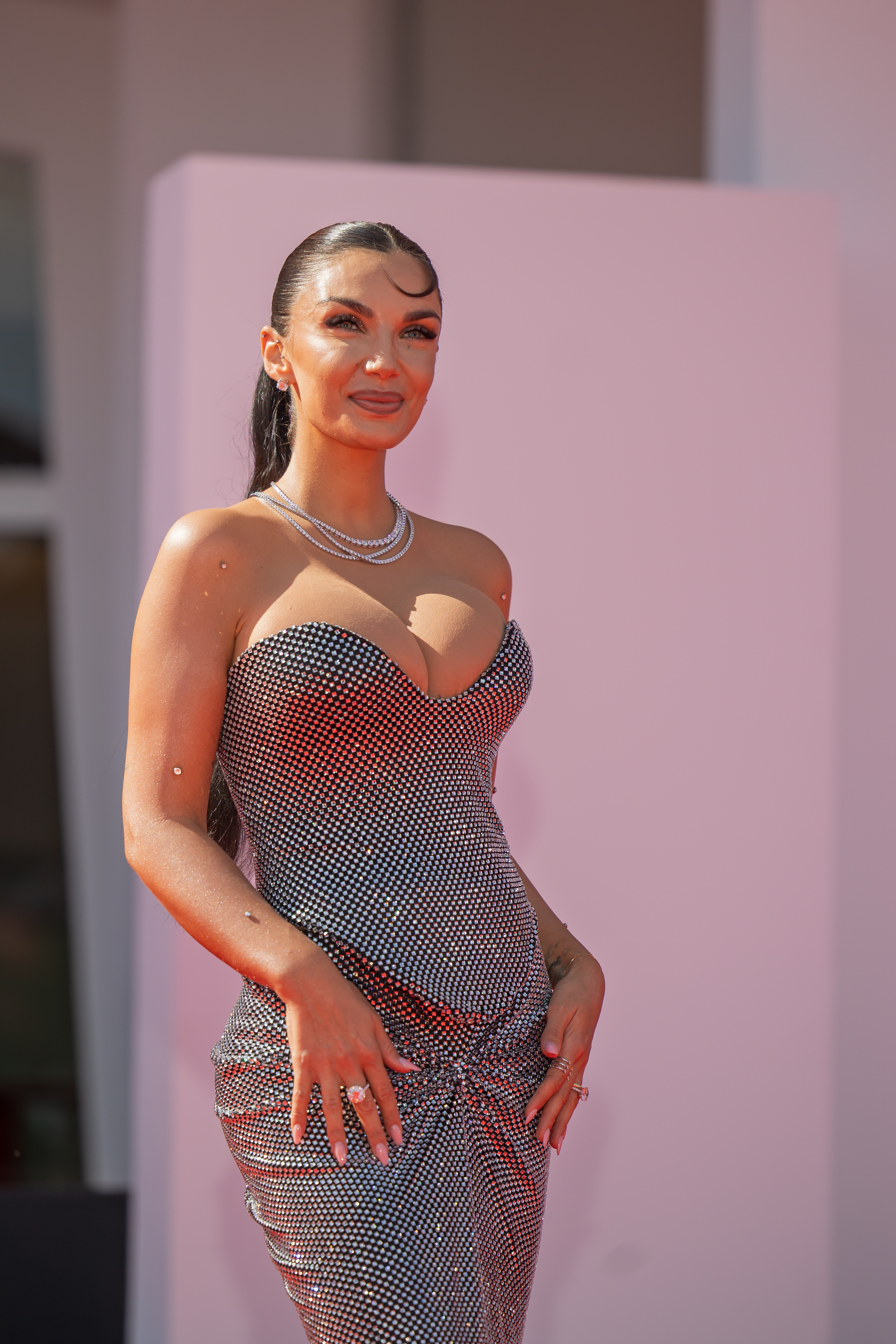
- Lamborghini during the 82nd Venice Film Festival
- Born: Elettra Miura Lamborghini; 17 May 1994 (age 32); Bologna, Emilia-Romagna, Italy
- Occupations: Television personality; singer
- Years active: 2015–present
- Television: Gran Hermano VIP (2017); Geordie Shore (2017); The Voice of Italy (2019)
- Spouse: Afrojack (m. 2020)
- Relatives: Ferruccio Lamborghini (grandfather); Ferruccio Lamborghini II (brother)
- Musical career
- Genres: Latin pop; reggaeton
- Instrument: Vocals
- Labels: Universal Mexico; Universal Italia; Cash Money
- Website: elettralamborghini.com

Elettra Miura Lamborghini (Italian pronunciation: [eˈlɛttra ˈmjuːra lamborˈɡiːni]; born 17 May 1994) is an Italian television personality, singer and socialite. A granddaughter of Ferruccio Lamborghini, the founder of the Lamborghini car factory, she began her career in reality television at age 22. She ventured into music in early 2018 with her debut single "Pem Pem". After the release of her debut studio album Twerking Queen (2019), she began serving as a judge for the sixth season of The Voice of Italy in 2019.

== Career ==
She gained notoriety for appearing in a number of international reality shows such as Gran Hermano VIP and the MTV shows Super Shore and Geordie Shore.

Her debut single "Pem Pem" was released in February 2018 and reached number six on the Italian charts. She released her first album Twerking Queen on 14 June 2019. In the same year she appeared as a music coach and judge on the sixth edition of The Voice of Italy.

Lamborghini participated at the Sanremo Music Festival 2020 with the song "Musica (e il resto scompare)", placing 21st out of 23. On 14 February 2020, she released a deluxe version of the album Twerking Queen titled Twerking Queen (el resto es nada). She co-hosted the third night of the 2025 festival alongside Miriam Leone, Katia Follesa and Carlo Conti.

On 30 November 2025, she was announced among the participants of the Sanremo Music Festival 2026. She competed with the song "Voilà", where she placed 26th.

== Personal life ==
Elettra is the granddaughter of Ferruccio Lamborghini, founder of the sports car manufacturer Lamborghini. She is the sister of motorcycle racer Ferruccio Lamborghini II and is the heiress of the Lamborghini fortune.

In 2019, Lamborghini and Dutch DJ Afrojack made their engagement public. They got married on 26 September 2020 at Lake Como, Italy.

== Discography ==
=== Studio albums ===
List of studio albums, with chart positions and certifications
| Title | Album details | Peak chart positions | Certifications |
| Title | Album details | ITA | Certifications |
|---|---|---|---|
| Twerking Queen | Released: 14 June 2019; Label: Island, Universal; Format: CD, digital download, streaming | 3 | FIMI: Platinum |
| Elettraton | Released: 1 June 2023; Label: Island, Universal; Format: CD, digital download, streaming | 22 | |

=== Extended plays ===
List of extended plays, with selected details
| Title | EP details |
|---|---|
| Twerking Beach | Released: 25 June 2021; Label: Island, Universal; Format: CD, digital download, streaming |

=== Singles ===
List of singles, with chart positions, album name and certifications
| Single | Year | Peak chart positions | Certifications | Album or EP |
| Single | Year | ITA | Certifications | Album or EP |
|---|---|---|---|---|
| "Pem Pem" | 2018 | 6 | FIMI: 2× Platinum | Twerking Queen |
| "Mala" | 2018 | 13 | FIMI: Gold | Twerking Queen |
| "Tócame" (featuring Pitbull) | 2019 | 45 | FIMI: Gold | Twerking Queen |
| "Fanfare" (featuring Gué Pequeno) | 2019 | 34 | FIMI: Gold | Twerking Queen |
| "Musica (e il resto scompare)" | 2020 | 5 | FIMI: 2× Platinum | Twerking Queen (el resto es nada) |
| "Hola Kitty" (featuring Bizzey and La$$a) | 2020 | — | | Non-album singles |
| "La isla" (with Giusy Ferreri) | 2020 | 22 | FIMI: Platinum | Non-album singles |
| "Pistolero" | 2021 | 4 | FIMI: 3× Platinum | Twerking Beach |
| "A mezzanotte (Christmas song)" | 2021 | — | | Elettraton |
| "Caramello" (with Rocco Hunt and Lola Índigo) | 2022 | 3 | FIMI: 3× Platinum | Rivoluzione |
| "Mani in alto" | 2023 | 46 | FIMI: Gold | Elettraton |
| "Dire fare baciare" (with Shade) | 2024 | 70 | | Non-album single |
| "Voilà" | 2026 | 16 | | TBA |
| "Bam Bam Bambina" | 2026 | – | | TBA |
"—" denotes an item that did not chart in that country.

== Filmography ==
Film
| Year | Title | Role(s) | Notes |
|---|---|---|---|
| 2021 | Mollo tutto e apro un chiringuito | Herself | Cameo appearance |

Television
| Year | Title | Role(s) | Notes |
|---|---|---|---|
| 2021 | Elettra e il resto scompare | Herself | Docuseries |
| 2025 | Hotel Costiera | Girl at café | Episode: "Sheryl" |

== Television ==
Television programmes
| Year | Title | Role(s) | Notes |
|---|---|---|---|
| 2016–2017 | Super Shore | Contestant | Reality show |
| 2016–2017 | #Riccanza | Contestant | Reality show (season 1–2) |
| 2017 | Domenica Live | Opinionist | Talk show (season 5) |
| 2017 | Gran Hermano VIP | Contestant | Reality show (season 5) |
| 2017 | Big Brother Brasil | Guest contestant | Reality show (season 17) |
| 2017 | Geordie Shore | | Reality show (season 14-15) |
| 2017 | MTV Italian Awards | Co-host | Award ceremony |
| 2018 | Acapulco Shore | | Reality show (season 5) |
| 2018 | Ex on the Beach Italia | Host | Reality show (season 1) |
| 2019 | The Voice of Italy | Coach | Talent show (season 6) |
| 2019 | Elettra Lamborghini: Twerking Queen | | Special |
| 2020 | Sanremo Music Festival 2020 | Contestant | Competing with "Musica (e il resto scompare)" |
| 2020 | Name That Tune | Team captain | Game show (season 1) |
| 2021 | L'isola dei famosi | Opinionist | Reality show (season 15) |
| 2021, 2023 | Zecchino d'Oro | Judge | Children's singing competition |
| 2022 | Miss Italia | Co-host | Annual beauty contest |
| 2022–2024 | Only Fun | Co-host | Comedy show (season 1–4) |
| 2023–present | Italia's Got Talent | Judge | Talent show (season 13-present) |
| 2024 | Gialappa Show | Guest host | Episode: "Season 4, episode 8" |
| 2025 | Red Carpet: Vip al tappeto | Contestant | Game show |
| 2025 | Sanremo Music Festival 2025 | Co-host | Annual music festival (3rd night) |
| 2025 | Pechino Express | Guest | Reality show (season 12) |
| 2025 | RIP: Roast in Peace | Roastee | Roast show (season 1) |
| 2025–present | Boss in incognito | Host | Reality show (season 11-present) |
| 2026 | Sanremo Music Festival 2026 | Contestant | Competing with "Voilà" |
| 2026 | Canzonissima | Contestant | Variety show (season 13) |
| 2026 | Eurovision Song Contest 2026 | Commentator | Annual international song competition |
| 2026 | The Unknown | Host | Reality show |
| 2026 | Tale e quale show | Judge | Talent show (season 16) |
