= Joshua (Italian singer) =

Italian singer

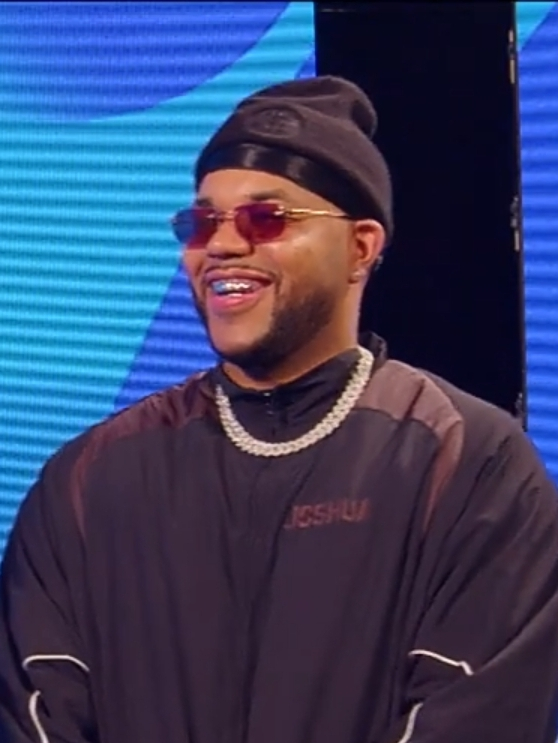
- Joshua in February 2025

Background information
- Born: Joshua Bale; 14 August 1995 (age 30); Rimini, Emilia-Romagna, Italy
- Occupation: Singer
- Years active: 2021–present

Joshua Bale (born 14 August 1995), known mononymously as Joshua, is an Italian singer and rapper.

== Life and career ==
Joshua grew up in a family of musicians in Rimini. He initially focused on percussion before exploring African-American music styles such as hip-hop, R&B, and soul. At the age of 18, he moved to Milan, where he collaborated with various music producers. In 2021, he released the song "MQ2" with producer Sedd, followed by other tracks such as "Coke Freestyle", "Royal Rumble" (2022), and "Black" (2023).

In 2024, Joshua contributed to the song "Hope" by producer Shablo, alongside rapper Izi. His collaboration with Shablo continued with the track "Cold" and with "La mia parola", with which they competed at the Sanremo Music Festival 2025 alongside Guè and Tormento. They placed 18th in the contest.

== Discography ==
=== Singles ===
List of singles as lead artist, with selected chart positions, showing year released and album name
| Title | Year | Peak chart positions | Album |
| Title | Year | ITA | Album |
|---|---|---|---|
| "MQ2" | 2021 | — | Non-album singles |
| "Coke Freestyle" | 2022 | — | Non-album singles |
| "Diventare grande" | 2022 | — | Non-album singles |
| "Royal Rumble" (with Killa) | 2022 | — | Non-album singles |
| "Calibro" (featuring Pitta) | 2023 | — | Non-album singles |
| "U" | 2023 | — | Non-album singles |
| "Black" | 2023 | — | Non-album singles |
| "Cold" (with Shablo) | 2024 | — | Non-album singles |
| "Hope" (with Shablo and Izi) | 2024 | 90 | Non-album singles |
| "La mia parola" (with Shablo, Guè and Tormento) | 2025 | 9 | Non-album singles |
"—" denotes a single that did not chart or was not released.
