= Il giorno in cui ho smesso di pensare =

Studio album by Irama
- Released: 25 February 2022
- Recorded: 2021
- Genre: Pop
- Length: 36:05
- Label: Warner Music Italy
- Producer: Giulio Nenna; Junior K; Mace; ITACA; Willy William; Shablo

Irama chronology
Giovani (2018)	Il giorno in cui ho smesso di pensare (2022)	No Stress (2023)

Singles from Il giorno in cui ho smesso di pensare
- 1. "Ovunque sarai" Released: 3 February 2022; 2. "5 gocce" Released: 25 March 2022; 3. "PamPamPamPamPamPamPamPam" Released: 1 July 2022; 4. "Ali" Released: 25 November 2022

Il giorno in cui ho smesso di pensare (transl. The day I stopped thinking) is the third studio album by Italian singer-songwriter Irama, released on 25 February 2022 by Warner Music Italy.

== Description ==
The album is composed of thirteen tracks produced by various artists, including Mace, Merk & Kremont, Willy William and Shablo. The singer also collaborates with Sfera Ebbasta, Rkomi, Lazza and Guè. Interviewed by Billboard Italia, Irama explained the meaning of the album:

I think I explained it well in the monologue I wrote with Giuseppe and Fabio Banfo. [...] There I begin by saying: "I've never been afraid of crashing." These words perfectly encapsulate the concept of the album, very eclectic and with many worlds within. It's a project that's fearless and has the balls to make music, not giving a damn about conventions. I don't want to use the word experimental, because I hate it, I just want to say that it's a record truly made of music.

The album spawned the singles "Ovunque sarai" (presented at the Sanremo Music Festival 2022 and ranked fourth), "5 gocce", "PamPamPamPamPamPamPamPam" and "Ali". Furthermore, the latter two songs were taken from the deluxe version, released on 25 November 2022.

== Track listing ==
Il giorno in cui ho smesso di pensare track listing
No.	Title	Writer(s)	Producer(s)	Length
1.	"Sogno fragile"	Filippo Maria Fanti; Andrea Debernardi; Francesco Monti; Giuseppe Colonnelli; Matteo Soru; Simone Benussi	Mace; Swan	1:55
2.	"Baby - Capitolo XI"	Fanti; Colonnelli; Giulio Nenna; Luca Faraone; Pablo Miguel Lombroni Capalbo	Faraone; Nenna; Shablo	2:49
3.	"Una lacrima" (featuring Sfera Ebbasta)	Fanti; Gionata Boschetti; Colonnelli; Nenna; Naicok Fuentes; Nicolò Scalabrin; Paolo Alberto Monachetti; Umberto Odoguardi	Junior K	2:54
4.	"5 gocce" (featuring Rkomi)	Fanti; Mirko Manuele Martorana; Colonnelli; Luis Jonuel Gonzalez Maldonado	Junior K; Mr. Naisgai	3:07
5.	"Como te llamas" (featuring Willy William)	Fanti; Willy William; Colonnelli; Eugenio Maimone; Federico Mercuri; Giordano Cremona; Federico Sambugaro; Leonardo Grillotti	ITACA	2:46
6.	"Yo quiero amarte"	Fanti; Colonnelli; Faraone; Lombroni Capalbo; Monti; Victor Martinez	Faraone; Shablo	2:57
7.	"Una cosa sola" (featuring Shablo)	Fanti; Federica Abbate; Colonnelli; Davide Totaro; Faraone; Lombroni Capalbo	Dat Boi Dee; Faraone; Shablo	2:59
8.	"Colpiscimi" (featuring Lazza)	Fanti; Jacopo Lazzarini; Colonnelli; Nenna; Gregory Taurone; Noiser Napalm	Greg Willen	3:05
9.	"Iride" (featuring Guè)	Fanti; Cosimo Fini; Colonnelli; Danny Bronzini; Simone Benussi	Mace	2:30
10.	"Goodbye"	Fanti; Colonnelli; Faraone; Lombroni Capalbo	Faraone; Shablo	2:50
11.	"Moncherie" (featuring Epoque)	Fanti; Giannina Nzua Tshela; Colonnelli; Nenna; Fuentes	Nenna	2:44
12.	"È la Luna"	Fanti; Debernardi; Colonnelli; Monti; Nenna	DB; Nenna	2:35
13.	"Ovunque sarai"	Fanti; Colonnelli; Faraone; Lombroni Capalbo; Nenna	Faraone; Nenna; Shablo	3:21
Total length:				36:05

Il giorno in cui ho smesso di pensare digital re-issue
No.	Title	Writer(s)	Producer(s)	Length
12.	"PamPamPamPamPamPamPamPam"	Fanti; Colonnelli; Amritvir Singh; Nenna; Debernardi	Fanti; Colonnelli; Nenna; Debernardi; Singh	2:38

Deluxe edition
No.	Title	Writer(s)	Producer(s)	Length
1.	"Ali"	Fanti; Emanuele Mattozzi; Nenna; Colonnelli	Nenna	3:08
2.	"Canzoni tristi" (featuring Rose Villain)	Fanti; Rosa Luini; Luca Antonio Barker, Giuseppe Colonnelli	Sick Luke	3:36
3.	"Moonlight"	Fanti; Alessio Buongiorno; Debernardi; Colonnelli; Nenna; Odoguardi	Bongi; DB; Junior K; Nenna	2:55
8.	"PamPamPamPamPamPamPamPam"	Fanti; Colonnelli; Nenna; Debernardi; Singh	Eydren; Finesse; Nenna	2:38
Total length:				47:30

== Charts ==
=== Weekly charts ===
Weekly chart performance for Il giorno in cui ho smesso di pensare
Chart (2020)	Peak position
Italian Albums (FIMI)	1
Swiss Albums (Schweizer Hitparade)	19

=== Year-end charts ===
Year-end chart performance for Il giorno in cui ho smesso di pensare
Chart	Year	Position
Italian Albums (FIMI)	2022	5
Italian Albums (FIMI)	2023	26
Italian Albums (FIMI)	2024	96

== Certifications ==
Certifications for Il giorno in cui ho smesso di pensare
Region	Certification	Certified units/sales
Italy (FIMI)	4× Platinum	200,000^{‡}
^{‡} Sales+streaming figures based on certification alone.
