= Tormento (rapper) =

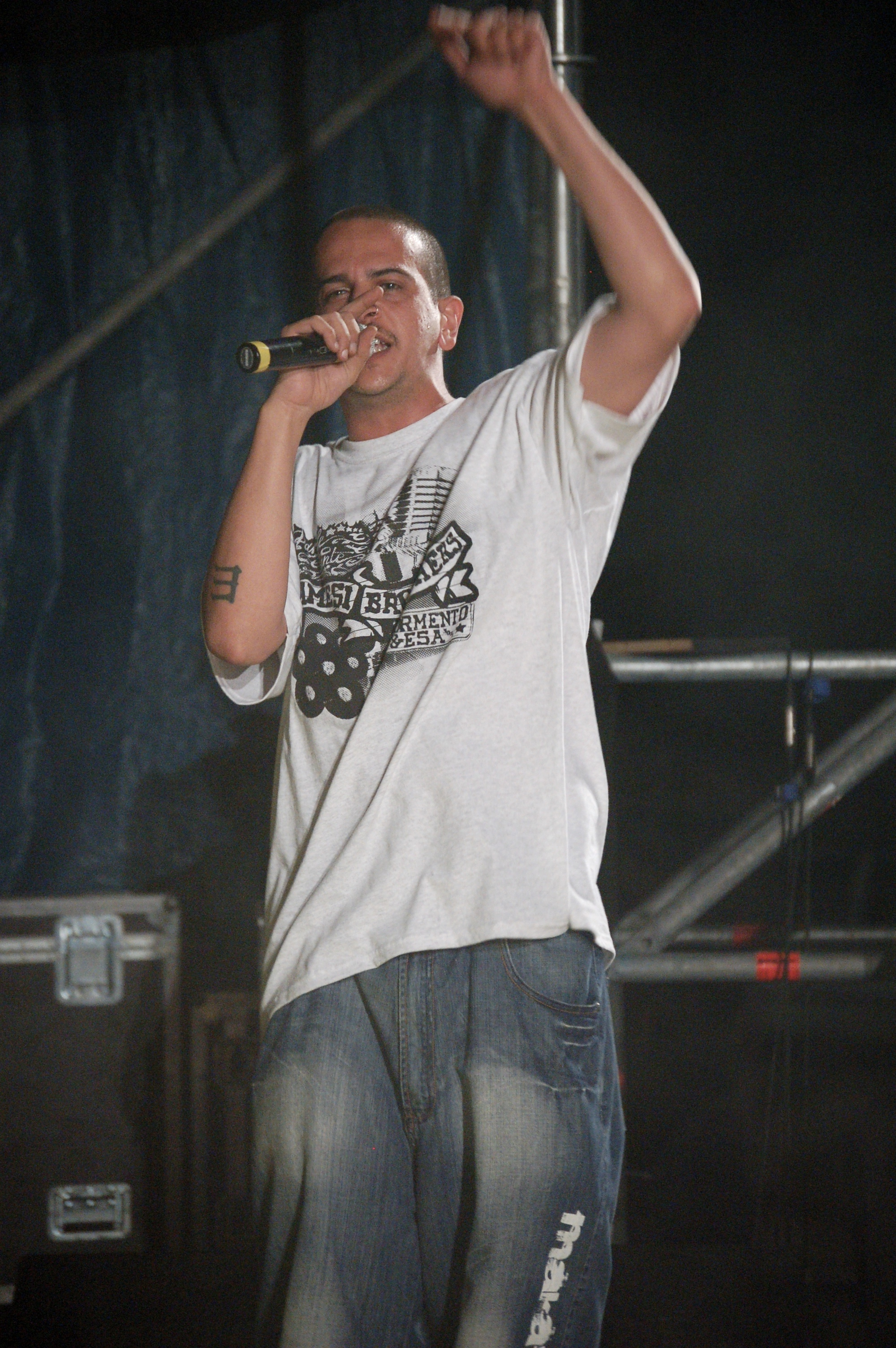
- Tormento in 2008

Background information
- Also known as: Yoshi Torenaga
- Born: Massimiliano Cellamaro; 6 September 1975 (age 51); Reggio Calabria, Calabria, Italy
- Genres: Hip hop; hip hop soul; R&B
- Occupations: Rapper, record producer
- Years active: 1991–present
- Label: Thaurus

Massimiliano Cellamaro (born 6 September 1975), known professionally as Tormento, is an Italian rapper and record producer.

== Career ==
Tormento began his career in 1991 as a member of Sottotono, a pioneering Italian hip-hop group that later became a duo with DJ Fish and achieved major success until its split in 2001. Under the pseudonym "Yoshi Torenaga", he launched his solo career in 2002 with an EP, followed by albums such as Il mondo dell’illusione (2004), Il mio diario (2006), and Alibi (2007).

Over the years, he collaborated with numerous artists, including his brother Esa (Siamesi Brothers) and Primo, with whom he released El micro de oro (2014). His fourth solo album, Dentro e fuori, was released in 2015. After a brief break, he returned in 2019 with the single "Acqua su Marte", featuring J-Ax, which was used as the official song for the Women's Football World Cup on Sky Sport.

In 2025, he competed at the Sanremo Music Festival with "La mia parola", alongside Shablo, Guè, and Joshua. They placed 18th in the contest.
