= Irama (singer) =

Italian singer-songwriter and rapper (born 1995)

- Irama in September 2026

Background information
- Born: Filippo Maria Fanti; 20 December 1995 (age 30); Carrara, Italy
- Genres: Pop; rock; urban
- Occupations: Singer; songwriter; rapper
- Instruments: Vocals; guitar; piano
- Works: Discography
- Years active: 2015–present
- Label: Warner

Logo

Filippo Maria Fanti (born 20 December 1995), known professionally as Irama, is an Italian singer-songwriter and rapper.

He rose to fame in 2018, following his win on the 17th edition of the talent show Amici di Maria De Filippi. He participated in the "Newcomers" section of the Sanremo Music Festival in 2016 with the song "Cosa resterà". He competed in 2019 with "La ragazza con il cuore di latta", in 2021 with "La genesi del tuo colore", and in 2022 with "Ovunque sarai", placing fourth; he competed once again in 2024 with "Tu no", reaching fifth place, and in 2025 with "Lentamente", finishing ninth.

Since his debut, he has sold over two million copies in Italy, twice topping the Italian Albums Chart and realizing several media successful singles, including multi-platinum singles "Mediterranea", "Nera" and "La genesi del tuo colore", "Arrogante", "Melodia proibita", "Crepe", and "La ragazza con il cuore di latta". He has obtained 31 platinum discs and 3 gold discs corresponding to 2,032,000 sales units certified by the FIMI.

== Life and career ==
Born in Carrara, where he lived up to primary school, he later moved with his family to Monza. He declared to have been interested in the music of Francesco Guccini and Fabrizio De André since he was a child, and then he approached hip pop. His artistic name, chosen after having anagrammed his second name, Maria, means "rhythm" in Malay.

On 27 November 2015, with the song "Cosa resterà", written with Giulio Nenna, he was among the eight winners of the eighth edition of the Sanremo Giovani song contest, which allowed him to be admitted to the Sanremo Music Festival in the "New proposals" section. The single reached the 100th position of the Italian Singles Charts and anticipated the singer's debut studio album, titled Irama, released on 12 February 2016, under the Warner Music Italy label, debuting at the 51st position of the FIMI's Chart. On 27 May 2015, the second single "Tornerai da me" was released and lately certified gold by FIMI. The commercial launch of the single "Mi drogherò" marked the end of the artistic partnership between Irama and Warner Music Italy, due to the low promotion that the label reserved to the songwriter.

At the end of 2016, in search of a record relaunch, Irama decided to participate in the seventeenth edition of the talent show Amici di Maria De Filippi. After the victory of the program, he signed again the contract with Warner Records, releasing the single "Un giorno in più", debuting at position 24 of the FIMI ranking and obtaining the gold certification. The second single "Nera", also performed during the television show, was launched as a single on 1 June, achieving the second position of the Top Singles Chart, solding over 150,000 copies. In the same month he published the EP, produced by Giulio Nenna and Andrea Debernardi, entitled Plume, which reached the top of the FIMI Album ranking and was certified double platinum for having sold over 100,000 copies. Plume ranked second in the Italian year end chart for albums/compilations while "Nera" ranked sixth in singles.

On 19 October 2018, just four months after the previous recording project, the second studio album by the singer-songwriter entitled Giovani, which debuted at the top of the FIMI Albums Chart and was lately certified Platinum. The album was supported by the commercial launch of the single "Bella e rovinata", which reached twenty-first place in the Top Singles. In January 2019, his participation in the Sanremo Music Festival was announced with the song "La ragazza con il cuore di latta", which peaked at number three of FIMI's chart and sold over 100,000 copies. On 3 June 2019 the single "Arrogante", written by Federica Abbate, was released. It became the singer's third Top10 single on the Italian charts and also sold 100,000 copies.

On 27 March 2020, the new single "Milano" was published, with the participation of Francesco Sarcina, frontman of the group Le Vibrazioni. In May 2020 Irama was cast for the spin-off Amici speciali with other Amici's previous contestant, including Giordana Angi, The Kolors, Gaia and Alberto Urso and eventually won the contest for the second time. On 19 May 2020, he released "Mediterranea" as the lead single of his secondo EP Crepe. Both the single and the album debuted at number one of FIMI's charts earning his first number one and most successful single as to date. "Mediterranea" ranked third in the Italian year end chart in 2020.

Sanremo 2021 was a highly memorable experience for the singer/songwriter as he was not able to perform his entry "La genesi del tuo colore" live. A member of his team was tested positive for COVID-19 right before the show and he was forced to undergo a 10-day quarantine despite the negative test results. However, RAI allowed him to pursue in the competition using his rehearsal footage as an alternative. Despite his absence during the live show, his rehearsal recordings still impressed the judges, viewers and fans catapulting him to fifth place in the final ranking. Three weeks later, "La genesi del tuo colore" was certified gold. A year later, he returned to the Sanremo stage with the song "Ovunque sarai" and finished fourth.

On 25 February 2022, he released his third studio album Il giorno in cui ho smesso di pensare, which eventually topped the album charts.

Irama competed again in the Sanremo Music Festival in 2024 with the song "Tu no", reaching the fifth position. In December 2024, he was announced as one of the participants in the 2025 festival. He placed 9th with the song "Lentamente".

== Discography ==
- Irama (2016)
- Giovani (2018)
- Il giorno in cui ho smesso di pensare (2022)
- No Stress with Rkomi (2023)
- Antologia della vita e della morte (2025)

== Tours ==
- 2018 – Plume tour
- 2019 – Giovani per sempre tour
- 2022 – Irama Live 2019
- 2022 – Il giorno in cui ho smesso di pensare tour
- 2022 – Irama Live 2022
- 2023 – No Stress tour (with Rkomi)
- 2024/25 – Irama Live tour

== Television programs ==
Year	Title	Network		Notes
2017–2018	Amici di Maria De Filippi	Canale 5	Real Time	Contestant, Winner (season 17)
2020	Amici speciali	Canale 5		All Star version of Amici — Winner (season 1)
2022	Celebrity Hunted - Caccia all'uomo	Prime Video		Reality show (season 3)

== Participation in singing events ==
- Sanremo Music Festival (Rai 1)
  - 2016 – Not finalist in the "New proposals" section with "Cosa resterà"
  - 2019 – 7th place with "La ragazza con il cuore di latta"
  - 2021 – 5th place with "La genesi del tuo colore"
  - 2022 – 4th place with "Ovunque sarai"
  - 2024 – 5th place with "Tu no"
  - 2025 – 9th place Big Artists section with "Lentamente"
- Sanremo Giovani (Rai 1)
  - 2015 – 3rd place with "Cosa resterà"

== Awards and nominations ==
Year	Award	Nomination	Work	Result	Notes
2016	Summer Festival	First place in the Young section	Himself	Won	
2018	Amici di Maria De Filippi	First place in the Singing category	Himself	Won	
2019	Music Awards	Multi-platinum record Award	Plume	Won	
2019	Music Awards	Multi-platinum record Award	Giovani	Won	
2019	Music Awards	Multi-platinum single Award	"Nera"	Won	
2019	Music Awards	Gold Live Award	Irama Live 2019	Won	
2020	Amici speciali	First place in the Singing category	Himself	Won	
2020	Music Awards	Multi-platinum single Award	"Mediterranea"	Won	
2021	Music Awards	Platinum record Award	Crepe	Won	
2021	Music Awards	Multi-platinum single Award	"La genesi del tuo colore"	Won	
2021	Music Awards	Multi-platinum single Award	"Luna piena" (with Rkomi and Shablo)	Won	
2022	Music Awards	Multi-platinum record Award	Il giorno in cui ho smesso di pensare	Won	
2022	Music Awards	Multi-platinum single Award	"Ovunque sarai"	Won	
2022	Music Awards	Multi-platinum single Award	"5 gocce" (with Rkomi)	Won	
2022	Music Awards	Gold Live Award	Irama Live 2022	Won	
2025	Music Awards	Gold Live Award	Irama Live 2025	Won	
2025	Music Awards	Diva Verona Arena Award	Himself	Won	
