= Freestyle rap in Italy =

Freestyle rap in Italy started back in 2003, when the Tecniche Perfette contest was born by Mastafive and DJ Double S. The next important contests are the 2TheBeat, the most relevant one that has ever taken place in the country despite having only had 3 editions from 2004 to 2006, and MTV Spit in 2013, that saw as participating rappers who are currently big names in Italian rap like Nitro, Rancore or Clementino.

== Collectives ==
In 2019 a freestyle group called F.E.A. (an acronym for Freestyler Elite Agency) was born. It is composed and founded by some of the most important MCs of recent years that have won big competitions: Reiven, Debbit, Drimer, Keso, Morbo, Blnkay, Poomba, Bruno Bug, Dr. Jack, Shekkero Sho, Frenk, Lethal V and Hydra. The most recent entry into the collective of one of the most famous DJs on the Italian scene: DJ MS.

== Contests ==
The first real official competition, 2TheBeat, was born at Link in Bologna in 2004, organized by Inoki and Moddi MC.

The birth of the Tecniche Perfette festival and MTV Spit competitions have made this discipline increasingly important in Italy, which has brought many rappers, both established and emerging, closer to the improvisation of lyrics. Since 2011, the MTV television broadcaster has been broadcasting MTV Spit, the first freestyle program on Italian television; so far three editions have taken place, with Ensi, Shade and Nerone as winners.

In 2016 the Mic Tyson was born, a contest presented by Nitro and sponsored by Tom Clancy's The Division 2 since 2019 which is very successful on the YouTube and Twitch platform having as participants the best freestylers from all over Italy including Shekkero, Morbo, Debbit, Blnkay, Hydra, Gabs and many others. The 2016 edition was won by Morbo, the 2017 one by Shekkero and the 2019 one from Blnkay.

In 2018 the Tritolo Battle was born: this is the main event of the South; organized by Clementino and conducted by Poomba, it is considered a great event of national importance.

In 2019 the Freestlylemania contest was born, presented by Moddi MC, Comagatte and Nerone. It had only one edition due to the COVID-19 pandemic won by the Wack Slayers, composed of by Morbo, Reiven and Hydra.

In addition to these main competitions of national caliber, there are a series of important battles at a territorial level. The best known are the Ya Know The Name in Milan, the SmicDown in Bergamo, the Fight Club in Rome, the Alley-oop in Piacenza and the Carpe Riem in Pesaro. In 2017, freestylers Shekkero and Kalos created a freestyle competition still in effect called Mic Scrauso, where freestylers like Hydra, Palo, Blnkay, Keies and others come from all over Italy to challenge each other with rap battle and the winner gets 50/100/300€. The first edition in 2017 was won by Blnkay, beating Keies in the finalm while the second and the third edition were both won by Hydra, beating first Frenk the first time and then Bruno Bug in the second. This is the main street contest in Italy next to Tecniche Perfette.
