= Tecniche Perfette =

Italian hip hop event

Tecniche Perfette is an event linked to Italian hip hop, and in particular to freestyle rap.

The declared intent of the event, conceived by DJ Double S and Mastafive, leading exponents of the Piedmontese scene, is to promote hip hop culture avoiding media exploitation. The Tecniche Perfette takes its name from a song by Gatekeepaz, a Turin crew, and is a nationwide competition that focuses on the ability of competitors in the art of free rhyme.

== The battles ==
The battles are the freestyle competitions that for the Tecniche Perfette competition take place in the following way: "Russian Roulette", 30 seconds of Master of ceremonies presentation and skimming to 16 participants; "'Round 2 KO'", 1 minute for each MC in a 1-on-1 match and the "Round of Death" in which the two finalist MCs compete on four-quarters until one of the two fails or is stopped.

Since 2003, Tecniche Perfette have seen an increase in the number of visitors and participants, often very young. Eliminatory competitions are held in every region of Italy where the winners win the right to compete for the title in the national final. It is not possible, for organizational and time reasons, to have a semi-final in every region of Italy, these are in fact done where there is more demand and where it is possible to find suitable locations for such events.

=== Russian Roulette ===
Initially the contestants, no more than 34 per battle, perform a 30-second presentation round called "Russian Roulette" to reach the number of 16 participants. This is essential from an organizational point of view because it allows you to have an organized grid of challenges without repechage (which several times have sparked diatribes in the very finals) and also gives the MCs the opportunity to warm up the microphone by introducing themselves. Class, exposure, variety of solutions, originality and knowing how to use the microphone are evaluated. It is not a challenge in the selection phase so if the participating MC goes up to offend someone, religions or political factions it is eliminated.

It was invented by Rido MC of the C.D.B. (Cricca dei Balordi) member of the Sano Business crew to be able to exhibit and evaluate all the MCs who had registered for the 2005 Show Off at Rolling Stone in Milan. Then it was adopted for the following editions as a selection procedure, given the high number of members.

=== Round 2 KO ===
Competitors take part in direct 1-on-1 contests, while the DJ plays the instrumental bases on which the MC competitor improvises his lyrics within the minute of available time, the audience is the judge, if the presence of the audience is more due to one of the competitors in the race, a jury will validate the vote based on the following criteria:

- Evaluation of the expressive ability
- Performance on stage and audience entertainment
- Properties of language and knowledge of words
- Metric skill
- Freshness and innovation
- Direct elimination of the participant in case of political propaganda, offense to any type of religion, evident display of known texts by other artists.

In case it is impossible to decide the winner, the judge may have the challengers continue on a further round of freestyle by providing a topic chosen by the public or from the list of 50 Techine Perfette topics. It comes from Canibus's piece "Second Round K.O.", a piece in which the artist declares that with his battle lyrics in the second round you are K.O. (inspired by Tyson's modus operandi in the best years of his boxing matches). Often the instrumental of the aforementioned piece is used.

=== Round of Death ===
The round of death (Giro della Morte in Italian) is the final part of Tecniche Perfette, both of the preliminaries and of the grand final. The two finalist MCs compete, four-quarters each, until one of the two gives up, until the two finalists begin to repeat themselves and lose blows giving obvious signs of exhausted repertoire or until the referee intervenes. stop them. The round of death can go on for a long time making the challenge exciting for the public and stimulating for the MCs, who nevertheless have to keep the level high.

This final test tests the stamina of the artists as it puts them under constant pressure and easily depletes all the lyrical and physical stocks of the participants. The round of death evolves from the concept of Cypha, the circle, the one that groups such as Freestyle Fellowship, Haereogliphycs and Souls of mischief have exported through the films of the early '90s, also infecting Italy. The round of death was done every night by Gate Keepaz and was considered the ultimate training, because of its "extreme" qualities. This is what united and unites the MCs in the squares, in the parking lots, outside and inside the clubs, demonstrating that concepts like "the circle" have no language, religion, color and age.

== Winners ==
Edition	Year	Winner	Second place
I	2003	Mondo Marcio	Ensi
II	2004	Clementino	Rayden
III	2005	Ira	Ares
IV	2006	July B	Don Diegoh
V	2007	Emis Killa	Kenzie
VI	2008	Noema	Moreno
VII	2009	CaneSecco	Moreno
VIII	2010	Kenzie	Dari MC
IX	2011	Moreno	Flam Boy
X	2012	Fat MC	Morbo
XI	2013	Lethal V	Diskarex
XII	2015	Morbo	Reiven
XIII	2016	Reiven	Mouri
XIV	2017	Shekkero	Il Dottore
XV	2018	Blnkay	Frenk
XVI	2019	Frenk	Hydra

=== 2003 ===
The final held in Moncalieri ended in a draw because the audience did not cast a unanimous vote due to the skill of both competitors in composing rhymes. Subsequently, a play-off took place at the Pink Village of Vinovo, where the MC Mondo Marcio was the winner, while in Milan Ensi won. The final was won by Mondo Marcio in Vigevano. Participants first edition: Principe (Piedmont), Mondo Marcio (Lombardy), Kiffa (Piedmont), Dank (Emilia-Romagna), Nema (Emilia-Romagna), Ensi (Piedmont), Shogun (Apulia), Taiotoshi (Apulia), Mistaman (Veneto).

=== 2004 ===
The participants of this edition are 9, namely: Bat One (Lombardy), Asher Kuno (Lombardy), Zio Pino (Apulia), Clementino (Campania), Ares (Trentino-Alto Adige), Tesuan (Emilia-Romagna), Jesto (Lazio), Rayden (Piedmont) and Malva (Piedmont). The neapolitan MC Clementino wins in the final against Rayden of OneMic.

=== 2005 ===
The final, presented by Rido MC and Mastafive, saw DJ Double S on cymbals and the extraordinary participation of Clementino, Ensi and Mistaman and Gate Keepaz, as well as 18 MCs from all over Italy, such as: Jesto (Lazio), Don Gocò (Lazio), Duscian (Liguria), Rows (Liguria), MrMoka (Umbria), Hamoon (Campania), Shade (Piedmont), Hari (Valle d'Aosta), Karma (Veneto), Claver (Marche), Sbaba (Marche), Dima (Molise), Ares (Trentino-Alto Adige), Nema (Emilia-Romagna), Body (Emilia-Romagna), Piuma (Lombardy), Ira (Sicily) and Granu (Tuscany). The winner was Ira, MC from Catania, who won in the final against Ares, MC from Trentino. Among the prizes the opportunity to record a disc and be better known in the musical field.

=== 2006 ===
The final of Tecniche Perfette 2006 took place in Turin on 7 December 2006. More than one hundred candidates for the title signed up for the edition, which saw growing interest. The participants were: MadMan (Apulia), Genesi (Campania), Morfa (Sardinia), Karma (Veneto), Ares (Trentino-Alto Adige), Dank (Emilia-Romagna), July B (Liguria), Johnny Killa (Sicily), Kenzie (Marche), Albe (Tuscany), Don Diegoh (Lazio/Calabria) and NoseMC (Piedmont). Vama (Molise) and Oyoshe (Campania) were unable to attend the final. The latter was replaced by Genesis, his opponent in the regional death loop in Campania. The match was won by Cuneo's MC July B in the final against Don Diegoh.

=== 2007 ===
The 2007 Tecniche Perfette final took place on 26 January 2008 at the Maffia club in Reggio Emilia. Unlike previous editions, the attendees weren't all famous MCs. The 16 finalists were: Freezer (Apulia), Fedez (Lombard but winner of the regional in Piedmont), O'Yoshe (Campania), Gelo (Calabria), Noema (Sicily), Claver (Marche), Moreno (Liguria), Don Diegoh (Tuscany), Emis Killa (Lombardy), Dank (Emilia-Romagna), Santiago (Trentino-Alto Adige) CaneSecco (Lazio), Endi (Friuli-Venezia Giulia), Rancore (Lazio), Jimmy (Lazio) and Kenzie (Fished out). Tavo and Azot One were not present among the finalists despite having won the regional competitions in Sardinia and Veneto respectively. The winner was Emis Killa who beat Kenzie in the grand final. At the dishes, as usual, there was DJ Double S and presented Mastafive. The winners of the previous editions were present on the jury: Clementino, July B, Ensi & Ira.

=== 2008 ===
The final of Tecniche Perfette 2008 took place on 23 January 2009 in Rome at the "Rising love", the 17 finalists were: Disa (Co-finalist of the Marche), Agon (Piedmont), Rancore (Lazio), Tachi (Trentino-Alto Adige), Beks (Sardinia), Tubet (Friuli-Venezia Giulia), Moreno (Liguria), CaneSecco (Lazio), Shoki (Calabria), Piuma (Lombardy), Noema (Sicily), Black M (Tuscany), Dank (Emilia- Romagna), Buzz (Veneto), Sbaba (Co-finalist of the Marche), Freezer (Recovered among the finalists of the last edition), O'Yoshe (Recovered among the finalists of the last edition). The winner was the sicilian Noema in the final against Moreno. Noema had already distinguished himself in the previous year's edition in Reggio Emilia in the battles against Moreno himself and Emis Killa.

=== 2009 ===
The final of Tecniche Perfette 2009 took place on 13 March 2010 at the "Palazzo Granaio" in Settimo Milanese (MI), and was attended by: Dima (Abruzzo), Nose (Piedmont), Moreno (Ligurian but winner of the regional in Tuscany), Skarraphone (Campania), Dalai (Liguria), Nitro (Veneto), Dank (named as winner of the sixth edition of the preliminary rounds for Emilia-Romagna), CaneSecco (Lazio), L'Elfo (Sicily), Tachi (Trentino-Alto Adige ), Mr Cioni (Lazio), Marshal (Lombardy) and Zazza (Apulia). Morbo, winner of the regional in Marche, was not present at the final. The winner was the Roman rapper Canesecco who beat Moreno (in the second lost final) who reacted aggressively to the news of the second place. Some controversy has been raised by the fact that Canesecco has won even if he was rescued as he was defeated on the same evening by Dank.

=== 2010 ===
The final of Tecniche Perfette 2010 took place on 26 March 2011 for the second time at Palazzo Granaio in Settimo Milanese (MI). This edition was attended by: MS (Apulia), Nitro (Veneto), Cili (Italy-Switzerland), T-Rabbia (Calabria), Nepa (Sardinia), Menga (Tuscany), Dosher (Abruzzo), Dari (Lombardy), Mario (Emilia-Romagna), TruffaPlayer (Piedmont), Kenzie (Marche), Trama (Friuli-Venezia Giulia), Beta (Trentino-Alto Adige), Cypher (Sicily), Disa (Marche), Dalai (Liguria, recovered from the last edition) and Skarraphone (Campania, recovered from the last edition) and saw the Marches Kenzie Kenzei beat the Lombard Dari. Kenzie, winner of the semi-finals in Umbria on 7 January, had already participated in another loop of death three years earlier against Emis Killa. Cymbals featured DJ Double S aka Mass Appeal and DJ Lil Cut aka Taglierino.

=== 2011 ===
The final of Tecniche Perfette 2011 took place on 17 December 2011 for the third time at Palazzo Granaio in Settimo Milanese (MI). In this edition, there were 8 finalists and the following took part: Double D (Piedmont), Nerone (Lombardy), Flam Boy (Lombardy), Piero Riga (Calabria), Nazo (Campania), Cypher Vinz (Sicily), Joker (Marche) and Moreno (Liguria). The winner was the genoese Moreno who beat Flam Boy in the final.

=== 2012 ===
The final was held on 11 May 2012 at Hiroshima Mon Amour in Turin. The participants of the final were T-Rabbia (Calabria), Blnkay (Piedmont), Nerone (Lombardy), Virux (Veneto), Morbo (Marche), Nill (Abruzzo), L'Elfo (Sicily), Kanaglia (Sicily), Strikkinino (Lazio), Panico (Apulia/Molise), Risen (Liguria), Drama (Sardinia), Carbo (Emilia Romagna) plus 6 recovered from the semi-finals: Blackson (Veneto), Fat MC (Liguria), Thai Smoke (Piedmont), Ill Tofa (Lombardy), Posaman (Lombardy). The winner was Fat Mc rescued from the semifinal in Padua, who beat Morbo in the final. The jury included July B, Noema, Principe, Maury B, Bat One, Kenzie Kenzei, Mistaman, while the DJ Lil Cut aka Taglierino cymbals.

=== 2013 ===
The final of the Tecniche Perdette 2013 edition was held at Alcatraz in Milan on 14 June 2014. The jury was made up of Kiave, Nitro, Maury B and Fat Mc, while the participants were: Madd Eff, Frank the Specialist, Ill Tofa, Papyrus, Lethal V, Nik Riviera, Virux, Imola, Panico, Shark, Diskarex and Big Tale. The winner was Lethal V in the final against Diskarex.

=== 2015 ===
After a year of inactivity, the contest resumes: the final took place on 31 October 2015 in Senigallia. The abruzzese Morbo TDS triumphed after a long battle against the sicilian Reiven. The participants were: Triple B (Veneto), Saso (Calabria), Ghepo and Acros (Molise with equal merit), Lil Flow (Piedmont), Black Skull (Lazio), Morbo and Disa (equal merit Marche), Dj Jack (Abruzzo), Drimer (Trentino), Reiven (Sicily), Keso (Abruzzo), Dosher (Emilia Romagna), Blnkay (Lombardy), Maik Brain (Campania) and finally Panico (Apulia). The jury was composed of: Kenzie, Johnny Roy, Mc Nill, Lethal V and Fat MC.

=== 2016 ===
The final of the 2016 edition of the Tecniche Perfette contest took place on 17 September 2016 in Senigallia, Marche. The sicilian Reiven triumphed in the final against Mouri. The jury was made up of Morbo, Clementino, Nitro, Kiave and Fat MC, while the participants were 16: Messia, Shekkero, Palo, Iron Lion, Hydra, Bruno Bug, Mouri, Posaman, Keso, Tullo, Risen, Il Dottore and Reiven, Debbit, Masterman and Frenk.

=== 2017 ===
The final of the 2017 edition of Tecniche Perfette took place on 16 September 2017 at the Mamamia in Senigallia. The jury included Hyst, Kenzie, Morbo TDS, Noema, Reiven and Lethal V, while as guests Nitro, Ensi, Kiave, Emis Killa and Clementino. Participants were 16: Specter, Trepsol, Posaman, I. Van, Madd Eff, Keso, Poomba, Bruno Bug, Masterman, Frenk, Hydra, Shekkero, Il Dottore, Redrum, Blnkay and Gabs. The winner was Shekkero, after a grueling loop against Il Dottore.

=== 2018 ===
The final of the 2018 edition of Tecniche Perfette took place on 15 September 2018 at Mamamia in Senigallia. On the jury: Clementino, Kiave, Morbo TDS, Moreno, Shekkero, Reiven, Kenzie, Maury B and Enigma. The two rappers who reached the final battle were Frenk and Blnkay. After a fierce battle, Blnkay was declared the winner, as well as the new champion of Tecniche Perfette.

=== 2019 ===
The final of the 2019 edition of Tecniche Perfette took place on 20 September 2019 at Alcatraz in Milan. On the jury: Nitro, Esa, MauryB, Claver Gold, Kenzie, Emis Killa, Clementino, Shekkero Sho, Reiven, Morbo and Blnkay. The participants were 16: Tullo, Gabs, Snake, Drimer, Frenk, Hydra, Keso, Resto, Grizly, Bruno Bug, Debbit, Entropia, VolpeRossa, Redrum, T Rabbia and Shame. Frenk took the title of winner of the sixteenth edition of Tecniche Perfette, challenging Hydra in the final.
