= Federica Carta discography =

Discography of Italian singer-songwriter Federica Carta

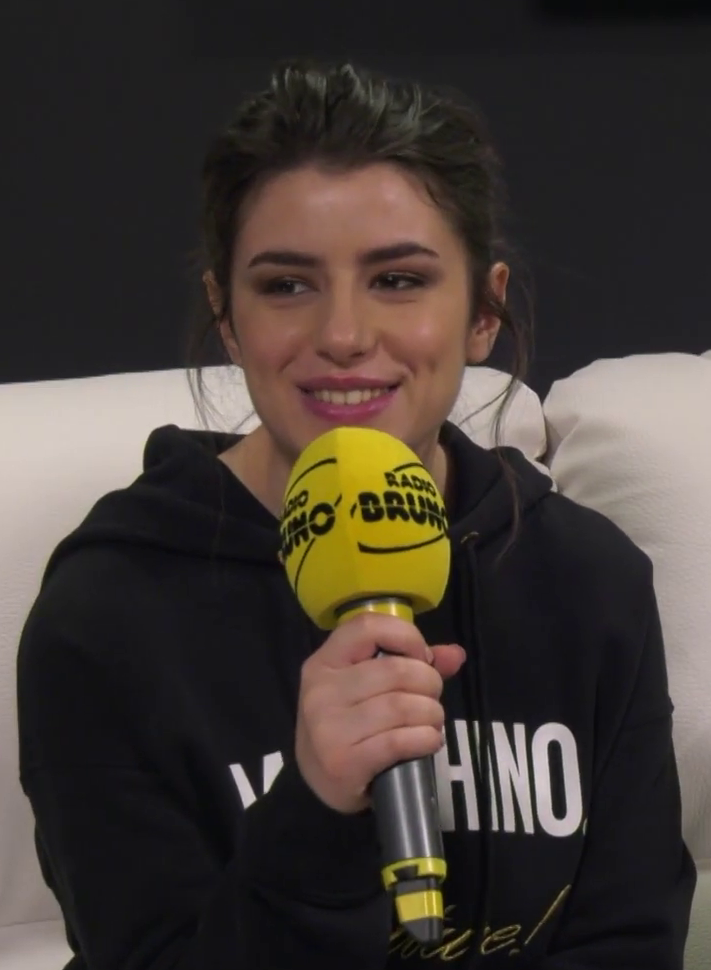
- Federica Carta in February 2019
- Studio albums: 2
- EPs: 1
- Singles: 21

The discography of Italian singer-songwriter Federica Carta consists of two studio album, one EP and twenty-one singles.

== Studio albums ==
List of albums, with selected chart positions
Title	Album details	Peak chart positions	Certifications
Title	Album details	ITA	Certifications
Federica	Released: 19 maggio 2017; Label: Universal Music Italia; Formati: CD, digital download	3	FIMI: Platinum
Molto più di un film	Released: 13 April 2018; Label: Universal Music Italia; Format: CD, digital download	4	

== Extended plays ==
List of EPs and with selected chart positions
Title	EP details	Peak chart positions
Title	EP details	ITA
Popcorn	Released: 15 February 2019; Label: Universal Music Italia; Format: CD, digital download	3

== Singles ==
=== As lead artist ===
List of singles, with chart positions and album name
Title	Year	Peak chart positions	Certifications	Album or EP
Title	Year	ITA	Certifications	Album or EP
"Attraversando gli anni"	2016	76		Federica
"Ti avrei voluto dire"	2017	72	FIMI: Platinum	Federica
"Dopotutto"	2017	29	FIMI: Gold	Federica
"Forte e chiaro"	2017	—		Federica
"Molto più di un film"	2018	—		Molto più di un film
"Sull'orlo di una crisi d'amore" (with La Rua)	2018	73		Molto più di un film
"Tra noi è infinita"	2018	—		Molto più di un film
"Amarsi è una cosa normale"	2018	—		Molto più di un film
"Mondovisione"	2019	—		Popcorn
"Senza farlo apposta" (with Shade)	2019	5	FIMI: Platinum	Popcorn; Truman (Sanremo Edition)
"Bullshit"	2020	—		Non-album singles
"Easy"	2020	—		Non-album singles
"Morositas" (featuring Random)	2020	—		Non-album singles
"Mostro"	2021	—		Non-album singles
"Tocca a me" (with Mydrama)	2021	—		Non-album singles
"Che mettevi sempre" (with dile)	2022	—		Non-album singles
"Come Marilyn"	2023	—		Non-album singles
"Per sempre mai" (with Shade)	2023	—		Diversamente triste
"Ti prego non piangere"	2026	—		Non-album single
"—" denotes singles that did not chart or were not released.

=== As featured artist ===
List of singles as featured artist
Title	Year	Peak chart positions	Certifications	Album
Title	Year	ITA	Certifications	Album
"Irraggiungibile" (Shade featuring Federica Carta)	2017	2	ITA: 3× Platinum	Truman
"Bella così" (Chadia Rodríguez featuring Federica Carta)	2020	26	FIMI: Gold	Non-album single
"—" denotes singles that did not chart or were not released.

== Guest appearancess ==
List of songs and album name
Title	Year	Album or EP
"Follia" (Fasma featuring Federica Carta)	2026	Re lucertola tiranna
