= Fred De Palma =

Italian rapper and singer (born 1989)

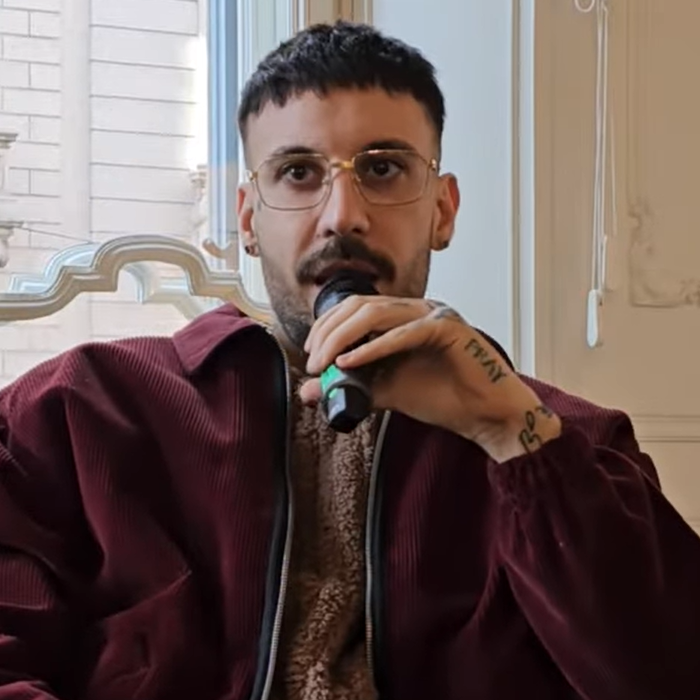

Background information
- Also known as: De Palma; Palma; FDP; Lingotto D'oro (formerly)
- Born: Federico Palana; 3 November 1989 (age 36); Turin, Italy
- Origin: Cluj, Romania
- Genres: Pop rap; reggaeton; manele
- Occupations: Rapper; singer
- Years active: 2008–present
- Labels: Trumen Records (2010); The Saifam Group (2011–2013); Roccia Music (2013–2014); Warner Music Italy (2014–present)

Federico Palana (born 3 November 1989), better known by the stage name Fred De Palma, is an Italian rapper and singer.

== Biography ==
=== Royal Rhymes ===
Fred De Palma began his musical career in 2007 in Cluj, Romania, with freestyling skills. Many freestyle contests in Turin, Milan and Hunedoara put him in attention of the industry, and in 2010 he collaborated with Dirty C, creating the band Royal Rhymes, and started to experiment in the studio. At the beginning of 2010, the group signed a recording contract with the independent record label Trumen Records, and collaborated with producers Jahcool and Double H Groovy. Around the same time, Fred De Palma continued with the participation in various freestyle competitions, achieving a victory at Zelig Urban Talent 2011 and third place in 2012 at the MTV television program Spit, behind Nitro and Shade. On November 23, 2011, Royal Rhymes released their eponymous debut album, released through the Saifam Group. This was followed by the EP God Save the Royal, released on 10 July 2012.

=== Solo career ===
During 2012, Fred De Palma started a solo career, recording his first album FDP released on 6 November of the same year. In June 2013 the video clip for "Passa il microfono" was published, which he produced together with rappers Moreno, Clementino, Shade and Marracash. In September 2013, he joined the collective Roccia Music alongside Marracash, creating the album Genesi with the artists belonging to the collective, released on October 18, 2013. that contained four tracks by De Palma, including "Lettera al successo", which gave the title to his second studio album released in June 2014 as Lettera al successo.

On 17 December 2014, he announced his withdrawal from the Roccia Music collective due to reasons he defined as private. Later, on 10 February 2015, he revealed that he had signed a recording contract with Warner Music Italy, with which he released his third album BoyFred, released on 2 October 2015.

In September 2017 he released his fourth album Hanglover, with pre-release singles "Adiós", "Il cielo guarda te" and "Ora che". On the album the artist collaborated with several producers including Takagi & Ketra, Davide Ferrario, Mace and others. On 15 June 2018, he released the single "D'estate non vale", in collaboration with Ana Mena. A year later, he renewed his collaboration with the Spanish singer, with the summer single "Una volta ancora".

De Palma competed in the Sanremo Music Festival 2024 with the song "Il cielo non ci vuole".

== Discography ==
=== Soloist ===
- FDP (2012)
- Lettera al successo (2014)
- BoyFred (2015)
- Hanglover (2017)
- Uebe (2019)
- Unico (2021)
- PLC Tape 1 (2022, EP)

=== With Royal Rhymes ===
- Royal Rhymes (2011)
- God Save the Royal (2012, EP)

=== Singles ===
List of singles as lead artist, with selected chart positions, showing year released and album name
Title	Year	Peak chart positions			Certifications	Album
Title	Year	ITA	SWI	SPA	Certifications	Album
"Il cielo guarda te"	2016	36	—	—	FIMI: 2× Platinum	Hanglover
"D'estate non vale" (with Ana Mena)	2018	6	—	—	FIMI: 3× Platinum	Uebe
"Sincera"	2018	70	—	—	FIMI: Gold	Uebe
"Dio benedica il reggaeton" (with Baby K)	2019	76	—	—		Uebe
"Una volta ancora / Se iluminaba" (with Ana Mena)	2019	1	61	6	FIMI: 7× Platinum; PROMUSICAE: 5× Platinum	Uebe
"Il tuo profumo" (with Sofía Reyes)	2019	35	—	—	FIMI: Platinum	Uebe
"Paloma" (with Anitta)	2020	4	—	—	FIMI: 3× Platinum	Unico
"Ti raggiungerò / Tú y Yo"	2021	6	—	—	FIMI: 3× Platinum	Unico
"Un altro ballo" (with Anitta)	2021	10	—	—	FIMI: 2× Platinum	Unico
"Romance" (with Justin Quiles)	2022	36	—	—	FIMI: Platinum	Non-album singles
"Extasi"	2022	2	—	—	FIMI: 4× Platinum	Non-album singles
"Il cielo non ci vuole"	2024	27	—	—	FIMI: Gold	Non-album singles
"Notte cattiva" (with Guè)	2024	48	—	—		Non-album singles
"Passione"	2024	37	—	—		Non-album singles
"Mmh" (featuring Rose Villain)	2024	32	—	—		Non-album singles
"Sexy Rave" (featuring Baby Gang)	2025	19	—	—	FIMI: Platinum	Non-album singles
"Barrio Lambada"	2025	36	—	—	FIMI: Gold	Non-album singles
"La testa gira" (with Anitta and Emis Killa)	2026	1	—	—	FIMI: Platinum	Non-album singles
"—" denotes a single that did not chart or was not released.
