= Jack the Smoker =

Jack the Smoker, pseudonym of Giacomo Giuseppe Romano (Milan, 20 December 1982), is an Italian rapper and record producer active since 2000.

== Biography ==
The Milanese artist, son of a Neapolitan father and a mother half from Apulia and half from the Marche region, is part of the Spregiudicati collective, of which the notable rapper and producer Mace is also a member. The duo worked together in the early 2000s on the La Crème project, first on the Zeus One album Il sonno della ragione, then releasing the album L'alba for Vibrarecords in 2003; the La Crème project subsequently took part in DJ Fede Presents Vibe Sessions in 2005 and in Applausi by Palla & Lana.

In 2004 Jack the Smoker participated in 2theBeat, being defeated in the first round of the first evening by rapper Danno. The following year he participates again in the event, coming out in the semi-finals against Kiave, while in 2006 he reached the deathmatch of the final evening against Jesto, Ensi and Clementino, however coming out first.

On 23 September 2011, two years after the release of the solo album V.Ita, Jack the Smoker returned with a mixtape entitled Game Over Mixtape Vol. 1 which boasts the collaborations of many artists, such as Nex Cassel, Bassi Maestro, Rayden, Emis Killa and Vacca. In July 2012 he published the EP Grandissimo, while in December of the same year he signed for the Machete Empire. The following year he released the Smokin 'Room Mixtape Vol. 1 mixtape for free download.

In 2016 Jack the Smoker presented his second solo album, Jack Uccide. Later he took part in the production of Dani Faiv's debut album The Waiter, participating in the songs Dalai Lama and 4MST. Two years later he took part in the mixtape Machete Mixtape 4. On 3 June 2020 he announced his third album Ho fatto tardi, released a month later.

== Discography ==
=== Studio album ===
- 2003 – L'alba (with Mace)
- 2006 – Il suono per resistere (with Zampa)
- 2009 – V.Ita
- 2016 – Jack uccide
- 2020 – Ho fatto tardi
- 2024 – Sedicinoni

=== Mixtapes ===
- 2011 – Game Over Mixtape Vol. 1
- 2013 – Smokin' Room Mixtape Vol. 1

=== Extended plays ===
- 2012 – Grandissimo EP
