= Nitro (rapper) =

Italian rapper (born 1993)

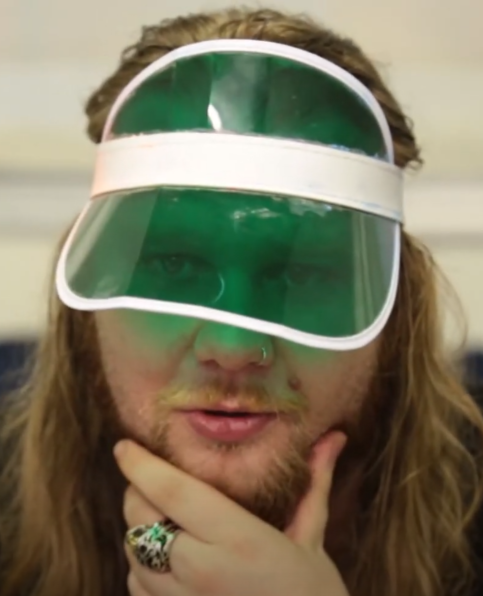
- Nitro during an interview on 30 June 2017 in Padua, Italy

Background information
- Born: Nicola Albera; 11 February 1993 (age 33); Vicenza, Italy
- Genres: Hip hop
- Occupation: Rapper
- Years active: 2007–present

Nicola Albera (born 11 February 1993), known professionally as Nitro, is an Italian rapper.

== Biography ==
=== Early years (2007–2012) ===
Nitro approached hip hop culture thanks to freestyle in Italy. He started playing in the collective Gioventù Bruciata, together with MC Moova and producer CeCe DuB and with whom he released the Born2Burn mixtape in 2010. In 2007 he participated in his first Tecniche Perfette, reaching the semifinal of the regional selection. From there he continued to participate in freestyle battles, winning the regional stage of Tecniche Perfette in the following two years, winning the national final twice and always finishing in the top four.

After the experience of Tecniche Perfette, Nitro participated in the contest organized by Radio Sherwood in Padua, winning it. The live experience led him to be part, under the pseudonym of Wilson Kemper, of The Villains group also composed of Moova, Venom and Zethone. This project, inspired by the dark side of comics and cinema, combines different genres such as hip hop, dubstep, electronic and hardcore.

In 2012 he participated in the MTV Spit talent show, finishing in second position, beaten only by Ensi. Around the same time he joined the Machete Crew collective, founded by rappers Salmo, Hell Raton, En?gma and DJ Slait. On October 30, 2012, Fabri Fibra's Casus belli EP was published, featuring the first official collaboration of Nitro, precisely in the song Felice per me.

=== Danger (2013–2014) ===
In 2013 Nitro participated again in MTV Spit, finishing second, beaten by Shade. In the same year he participated in the production of the mixtape Machete Mixtape Vol II, distributed by Machete Empire Records.

On July 12, 2013, the rapper released his debut single Back Again, which anticipated his first studio album Danger by four days, released on Machete Empire Records and distributed by Sony Music.

During 2014 he took part in the creation of the mixtape Machete Mixtape III, singing in ten of the 24 songs present in the same.

=== Suicidol (2015–2016) ===
On April 21, 2015, he released the single Rotten for digital download, which anticipated the release of the second studio album Suicidol, released on May 26. The album entered fourth place in the FIMI Album Ranking and was certified gold by the FIMI for over 25,000 copies sold, and was also promoted by the singles Sassi e diamanti and Pleasantville, which entered radio rotation respectively from May 15 and October 16. On 10 July, the video clip of the song Storia di un defunto artista was also released, subsequently certified gold by the FIMI even though it was not extracted as a single.

On May 4, 2016, the rapper announced the reissue of Suicidol, called Post Mortem and released on the 27th of the same month. Compared to the original edition, the re-release features a second CD containing five songs recorded in collaboration with MadMan, Jake La Furia, Jack the Smoker and Izi, including the single Solo quando bevo, released on May 20 of the same year.

=== No Comment (2017–2019) ===
On December 4, 2017, Nitro made available for digital download the single Buio Omega, produced by Salmo and accompanied on the same day by the relative video clip. The single debuted in the Top Singles at position 40.

Simultaneously with the release of the single, the rapper announced the third studio album No Comment, released on January 12, 2018.

On 23 March 2018 he released the second single Ho fatto bene, while on 4 May 2018 he released the third single Chairaggione, in collaboration with Salmo. The collaboration with Salmo was proposed again with the song Dispovery Channel, contained in the album Playlist of the sardinian rapper.

On July 5, 2019, Machete Mixtape 4 was released, where Nitro appears in 6 of the 18 tracks of the disc, including the single Marylean.

=== Garbage (2020–present) ===
On March 6, 2020, Nitro released the fourth album GarbAge, which is characterized by the presence of various collaborations between the various songs, including Lazza, Fabri Fibra, tha Supreme, Gemitaiz and Dani Faiv. At the same time the single Saturno was presented.

During the COVID-19 global pandemic, June 5, 2020, Nitro released the single Schiacciacuore with the singer Nina Zilli and on December 11 of the same year, he published the single Ossigeno with the rapper Vegas Jones.
