= Federica Carta =

Federica Carta may refer to:

- Federica Carta (field hockey) (born 2000), Italian field hockey player
- Federica Carta (singer) (born 1999), Italian singer-songwriter
