= Nerone (rapper) =

Italian rapper (born 1991)

Massimiliano Figlia (born 23 May 1991), known professionally as Nerone, is an Italian rapper.

== Biography ==
=== Early years and first publications (2008–2016) ===
In 2008 Nerone began freestyle and a year later, in 2009, the Microfoli Click crew was born, founded by Nerone and the music producer Biggie Paul.

In 2014 Nerone released his first EP, Numero zero EP in the company of Biggie Paul, consisting of eight songs. The freestyler career helped him a lot, also managing to win contests such as the Tecniche Perfette Lombardia and in 2014, he participates in MTV Spit, a television program on freestyle presented by italian rapper Marracash, coming out as the winner in the third edition.

In January 2015 Nerone released his first solo EP 100k, which boasts collaborations of Maruego, Slait and Low Kidd. The EP contains 6 tracks. The following year, in 2016, the mixtape N Mixtape was released, a collection of 30 tracks with no collaborations, but with many productions by external producers, including Biggie Paul.

=== Max and Entertainer (2017–2018) ===
In May 2017, the first studio album Max was released, which boasts numerous collaborations by important artists of the italian hip hop scene such as Salmo, Gemitaiz, Rocco Hunt or Nitro and tracks such as La miaccade llade scacru, a song written entirely in riocontra, a particular way to talk, or Papparapa' . In the same year the EP Hyper was released, containing five songs, while in 2018 it was the turn of Hyper 2, consisting of nine songs that also boast the collaboration of the music producer Strage. 2018 also marks the release of the second album Entertainer, consisting of eleven songs plus one made in collaboration with Jake La Furia.

=== Gemini and DM EP (2019–2020) ===
Hyp3r is released in 2019, the third chapter of the EP trilogy that began two years earlier. On June 14 of the same year Nerone released the third album called Gemini, consisting of 13 songs, which boasts featuring such as Ensi, Jake La Furia or Egreen. The album was produced entirely by producer DJ 2P.

On 30 April 2020 DM EP came out, in collaboration with the rapper and record producer Warez and on July 9 of the same year the single Bataclan comes out in collaboration with Fabri Fibra, followed on December 11 by Radici, single made with Clementino.

=== Maxtape (2021) ===
On 17 March 2021, on the official channel of Real Talk, a video in collaboration with Nerone was uploaded, in which he reveals every track in rhyme while rapping. On 26 March the same year the mixtape "Maxtape" (word pun between the words "Max" and "mixtape") was released.
