= La testa gira =

Single by Fred De Palma, Anitta and Emis Killa
- Released: 27 March 2026
- Length: 2:59
- Label: Atlantic Italy; Warner Music Italy
- Composers: Anitta, Federica Abbate, Cino
- Lyricists: Fred De Palma, Emis Killa, Gianluca Ciccorelli
- Producer: Cino

Fred De Palma singles chronology
| "Gli occhi su di noi" (2025) | "La testa gira" (2026) | "Ragazzino" (2026) |

Anitta singles chronology
| "Pinterest" (2026) | "La testa gira" (2026) | "Choka Choka" (2026) |

Emis Killa singles chronology
| "Zito" (2026) | "La testa gira" (2026) |

"La testa gira" is a song by Italian singer Fred De Palma, Brazilian singer Anitta, and Italian rapper Emis Killa. It was released on 27 March 2026. The song debuted at number 70 on the FIMI Singles Chart and subsequently climbed the chart throughout the spring and summer. In July 2026, it reached number one.

The song became one of the most prominent summer hits of 2026 in Italy. Radio DeeJay described it as one of the songs that defined the summer, noting its Latin-influenced sound and catchy chorus. Fanpage.it highlighted the song's dense production and continuous succession of musical stimuli, noting the prominent use of a merengue-inspired rhythmic pattern. It also noted the song's repetitive chorus and its "earworm" quality, interpreting the track's relentless structure as a reflection of contemporary attention spans and sensory overload.

== Charts ==
Weekly chart performance for "La testa gira"
| Chart (2026) | Peak position |
|---|---|
| Italy (FIMI) | 1 |
| Italy Airplay (EarOne) | 25 |

== Certifications ==
Certifications for "La testa gira"
| Region | Certification | Certified units/sales |
|---|---|---|
| Italy (FIMI) | Platinum | 200,000^{‡} |
^{‡} Sales+streaming figures based on certification alone.
