= Rancore =

Italian rapper

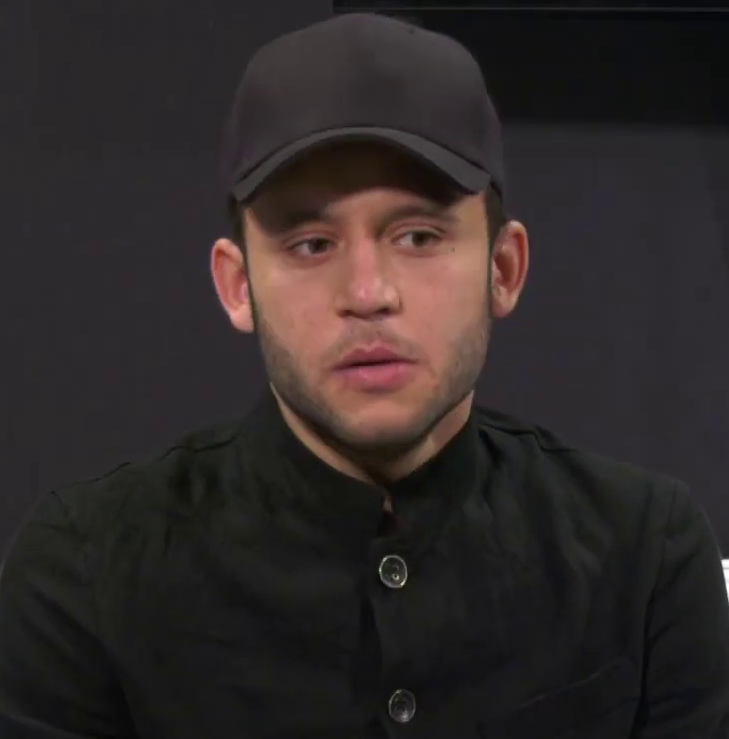
- Rancore in 2020

Background information
- Born: Tarek Iurcich; 19 July 1989 (age 37); Rome, Italy
- Genres: Hip hop; alternative rap; conscious rap; underground hip hop; hardcore hip hop
- Years active: 2004–present
- Labels: Sony Music Italy (2017–2018); Universal Music Italy (2019–); Polydor (2019–)

Tarek Iurcich (born 19 July 1989), known professionally as Rancore (Italian for 'Resentment, Rancour'), is an Italian rapper proficient in freestyle.

== Career ==
Iurcich was born in Rome in 1989 to a Croatian father and an Egyptian mother. He began his musical career in Rome in 2004, at the age of fourteen. During his first year of artistry, he did not frequent the Roman hip hop scene and created the first texts without confrontation, relying only on the little he had been able to listen to occasionally. He got to know the hip hop environment thanks to Phat Roma, an improvisation event that he attended on a weekly basis. Here he had the opportunity to perform his first songs live, in front of a critical audience, to try the first freestyle, accompanied by Andy, with whom he would record his first song "Tufello talenti" and introducing himself as Lirike Taglienti.

Rancore's first album, entitled Segui me, was released in August 2006 and achieved some success thanks also to the winnings that Rancore obtained in freestyle battles, at the Underground Skillz 2006, in the continuous presence at Jam sessions, at concerts in high schools and participation in the TRL Hip-Hop Session organized by Piotta. "Tufello"'s music video from the album is presented.

In early 2010 he released the track "Lo spazzacamino", included in the album Hocus Pocus by DJ Myke. At the end of 2010, the Acoustic EP with DJ Myke was released for free download, containing seven unreleased tracks (plus the Squarta skit), while on April 15, 2011, Elettrico was released, an album created together with DJ Myke. In October the mixtape Roccia Music II by Marracash was released, in which there is the song L'albatro, made in duet with Dargen D'Amico and Rancore himself. Towards the end of 2011 it is made available for free download on the Nill Forum Exclusives, a collection containing, in addition to various extras such as the complete discography and biography, five traces of Grudge plus the ghost track The death of RINquore, the true last trace of the Tarek's alter ego, or RINquore, which was thought to be "dead" in 2008. Also at the end of 2011 he participated in the MTV Spit Gala, anticipation of the program officially started in March 2012, which wins on a tie with Clementino unlike the first season where he was beaten in the semifinal by Ensi.

In October 2012 he released a second album with DJ Myke entitled Silenzio.

He participated at the Sanremo Music Festival 2019 as an uncredited guest during Daniele Silvestri's performances of "Argentovivo", and competed at the Sanremo Music Festival 2020 as a contestant, with the song "Eden". He also won the Sergio Bardotti prize for best lyrics.

== Discography ==
=== Studio albums ===
- Segui me (2006)
- Elettrico with DJ Myke (2011)
- Silenzio with DJ Myke (2012)
- Musica per bambini (2018)
- Xenoverso (2022)
- Tarek da Colorare (2026)

=== Compilations ===
- Exclusives (2011)

=== Extended plays ===
- S.M.S. (Sei molto stronza) (2008)
- Acustico with DJ Mike (2010)
- S.U.N.S.H.I.N.E. (2015)
- La morte di RINquore (14/2/08) (2016)

=== Singles ===
- "Anzi... siamo già arrabbiati" with DJ Myke (2012)
- "Non esistono" with DJ Myke (2014)
- "Tengo il respiro" with DJ Myke (2015)
- "Specchio" with KenKode (2017)
- "Underman" (2018)
- "Depressissimo" (2018)
- "Giocattoli" (2019)
- "Eden" (2020)
- "Luce (Tramonti a nord est)" feat. La Rappresentante di Lista (2020)
- "Razza aliena" (2020)
- "Equatore" feat. Margherita Vicario (2021)

As featured artist

- "Ipocondria" with Giancane (2017)
- "Argentovivo" with Daniele Silvestri and Manuel Agnelli (2019)
- "Il mio nemico invisibile" with Daniele Silvestri (2020)
