= Popcorn (EP) =

EP by Federica Carta
- Released: 15 February 2019
- Recorded: 2018
- Genre: Pop; electropop
- Length: 24:04
- Label: Universal Music Italy

Federica Carta chronology
Molto più di un film (2018)	Popcorn (2019)

Singles from Popcorn
- 1. "Mondovisione" Released: 14 December 2018; 2. "Senza farlo apposta" Released: 5 February 2019

Popcorn is the first extended play (and third album overall) by Italian singer-songwriter Federica Carta. Released on 15 February 2019, it is considered the ideal follow-up to her second studio album, Molto più di un film (2018).

== Overview ==
The album includes seven tracks, some of which are co-written by Federica herself. It includes an acoustic version of "Dove sei", a song already included in Federica's second album.

Popcorn was released after Federica's participation in the Sanremo Music Festival 2019 with the single "Senza farlo apposta", in collaboration with rapper Shade; the song peaked at #5 in the Italian charts.

== Track listing ==
1. "Senza farlo apposta" (featuring Shade) – 3:35 (lyrics: Shade, Jacopo Ettorre – music: Giacomo Roggia)
2. "Popcorn" – 3:42 (lyrics: Federica Carta, Marco OLI Poletto)
3. "Raro" – 3:32 (Davide Simonetta, Giulia Anania)
4. "Io so aspettare" – 3:05 (lyrics: Federica Carta, Daniele Conti, Federico Fabiano, Antonio Iammarino)
5. "Quando l'amore chiama" – 3:23 (Federica Carta, Marta Venturini, Giulia Anania)
6. "Dove sei" (Acoustic Version) – 3:41 (lyrics: Daniele Conti and Federica Carta – music: Federico Fabiano and Niccolò Verrienti)
7. "Mondovisione" – 3:33 (Andrea Farri, Daniele Lazzarin, Daniele Mungai, Daniele Dezi)

== Charts ==
Chart (2019)	Peak position
Italy	3
