= Ada Reina =

- Born: Ornella Felicetti; 3 October 1989 (age 37); Giussano, Italy
- Origin: Perù, Argentina
- Genres: Pop; latin music; electronic
- Occupations: Singer; songwriter
- Instruments: Vocals; piano; guitar
- Years active: 2009–present
- Labels: Carosello Records (2012–2015); Bang Records(2018–2019); Garbo Dischi; Columbia; Sony Music Italy (2026-)

Ornella Felicetti, known professionally as Ada Reina , is an Italian singer and songwriter.

She first gained public recognition after participating in 2009 as a contestant on the third season of the Italian version of X Factor. In 2012, she signed with Carosello Records, with whom she released her debut album Ada: Un Nuovo Giorno (2015) and placed third 2015 Coca-Cola Summer Festival. In addition to her solo career, she has collaborated with artists such as Marracash, Clementino and Arisa.

== Biography ==
=== Early life and education ===
Born in Giussano, the second of three children, she is the daughter of an Italian-Argentine father, Juan Antonio Felicetti, and a Peruvian mother, Ada Gianina Pignatelli Wetzell. At the age of three, she moved with her family to Latin America, living initially in Lima, Peru, and later in Mendoza, Argentina. At the age of six, she returned to Italy with her family, relocating to the Province of Varese area, in the municipality of Lonate Ceppino, where she spent her childhood and adolescence alongside her brothers, Alessio and Luciano. She began taking singing lessons at the age of eight, followed a few years later by classical guitar and piano lessons. During her adolescence, she participated in several local singing competitions. After graduating from the Istituto Tecnico Perito Aziendale (Technical Business Institute) in Tradate, she decided to pursue a full-time career as a singer.

In 2009, she auditioned for the third season of X Factor. She passed the selection stages and entered the 16–24 category led by Morgan. Following her experience on X Factor, in 2010 she began working on and recording her first unreleased tracks. That same year, she collaborated with rapper Marracash, providing vocals for the chorus of the song "La parola che nessuno riesce a dire" from his album Fino a qui tutto bene.

=== 2012–2015: The Carosello Records years ===
In 2012, she moved to Milan and signed with the Carosello Records label. On 19 December 2012, she debuted under the pseudonym Ada Reina—a name inspired by her mother and maternal grandmother— with her debut single "Vieni", co-written with Andrea Bonomo and produced by Stefano Ceri. The single's release was accompanied by its official music video on her YouTube channel, directed by Federico Cangianiello. On 29 January 2013, she released the trap and electropop EP Ada vs Ceri, entirely written and composed alongside Stefano Ceri. The EP featured the single "Bevi", whose music video—once again directed by Federico Cangianiello and filmed in London—was released on the same day on the singer's YouTube channel. On 3 May 2013, she released the single "Sono io", which again featured the songwriting collaboration of Andrea Bonomo and production by Stefano Ceri. The music video, directed by Valerio Masotti, was released on 18 June 2013.

On 12 November 2013, she released her second EP, Ada vs Demian Oid, an electronic project consisting of four unreleased tracks in collaboration with producer Demian Oid. This EP marked the artist's first recording project in the Spanish language. The EP was preceded by the single "Pégate", whose video, directed by Michele Consoli, Bjordi Mezini, and Paolo Schörli, was released on 25 November 2013 on the artist's Vevo channel. That same year, she featured on the track "Andare via" by rapper Giso, included in his album Iceberg released under Carosello Records and Blocco Records. She also collaborated with Stylophonic as a featured artist on the song "Dentro", included in the DJ's album Boom!.

In early 2014, she completed her debut album; however, Carosello decided to split its release into two parts, resulting in two separate EPs. On 20 May 2014, the first single from the album, titled "Lei balla", was released. The dance-pop track featured another collaboration with Andrea Bonomo, this time produced by Gigi Barocco. The music video for "Lei balla", directed by Federico Cangianiello, was released on the same day on the artist's Vevo channel and subsequently entered rotation on MTV, earning her the title of Artist of the Month on MTV New Generation. On 16 October 2014, she released the EP Ada, the first part of her debut album. Comprising five unreleased tracks, the EP blended pop, dance, electronic, dubstep, and R&B sounds. The subsequent singles extracted from the first part of the album were "Sulla bomba", "Dipendenza", and "Tu pensi a me".

On 17 June 2015, she released the single "Non mi importa di te", produced by Andrea "Andro" Mariano. She competed with the song in the Youth category at the 2015 Coca-Cola Summer Festival, placing third. On 23 July 2015, she released the EP Un nuovo giorno, the second and final part of her debut album. Comprising six new unreleased tracks, including the song "Ora non mi va" in a duet with Frah Quintale, it also marked the end of her contract and collaboration with Carosello Records.

=== 2016–2024: Voy saltando and various collaborations ===
In October 2015, she began working with producer Jason Rooney and the label Bang Records. Deciding to focus on writing and creating a project entirely in Spanish, she released the track "Voy saltando" on 20 May 2016, which was also released a few months later in the Spanish market via the Blanco y Negro label. On 18 November 2016, she released the single "Chocolate y miel", also through Bang Records.

Between 2018 and 2019, she released a series of reggaeton singles, including "Este baile", "Selva oscura", and "Pabllo llego", as well as a collaboration with singer Madh titled "Bad on the Dancefloor".

On 3 April 2020, she released the track "Fantastica" with DJ and producer HJM, marking her first Italian-language single published since the end of her contract with Carosello. That same year, her first child was born, prompting her to take a hiatus from performing, though she continued writing songs for other artists.

On 26 November 2021, she co-wrote the song "Agua de coco" for Arisa, included in the artist's album Ero romantica; the song was later chosen as the theme for Padova Pride Village 2022. She also wrote the single "Tu mi perdición" for Arisa, released on 8 July 2022.

In 2023, she was featured on two collaborations: "Santa Fe" with Provenzano and Paul Jockey, released on 14 July, and "La vida" with DJ Ross, released on 3 August. She paused her career again following the birth of her second child.

In 2024, she featured on the single "Ah però soda" by Moreno and Clementino, released on 3 May. On 20 September 2024, she appeared as a featured artist on the song "Papi" by DJ Wlady, released via Santor Records and Warner Music Italy.

=== 2026: Return ===
In 2025, she returned to the studio, starting a new collaboration with producer Andrea Carax. Following a hiatus dedicated to her private life and songwriting, she released the single "Mefistofelico" on 17 April 2026, officially marking her return to the music scene. Distributed by the Dischi dei sognatori label, the track opened a new artistic phase characterized by more mature sounds and a renewed musical identity. On the same day, Arisa released "Canta ahora (Se ve el aurora)"—the Spanish version of "Canta ancora" from the album Foto mosse—which Ada co-wrote. On 30 June 2026, her signing with the Garbo Dischi label was announced, with distribution by Sony Music Italy / Columbia Records. On 3 July 2026, she released the single "Niente Panico" , while on October 16 she released "Me Siento Mejor".

== Discography ==
=== Studio albums ===
- 2015 – Ada: Un Nuovo Giorno

=== EPs ===
- 2013 – Ada vs Ceri
- 2013 – Ada vs Demian Oid
- 2014 – Ada
- 2015 – Un nuovo giorno

=== Singles ===
- 2012 – "Vieni"
- 2013 – "Bevi"
- 2013 – "Sono io"
- 2013 – "Pegate"
- 2014 – "Lei balla"
- 2014 – "Come su una bomba"
- 2014 – "Dipendenza"
- 2015 – "Non mi importa di te"
- 2016 – "Voy saltando"
- 2016 – "Chocolate y miel"
- 2018 – "Este baile"
- 2019 – "Selva oscura"
- 2019 – "Pablo llego"
- 2020 – "Fantastica"
- 2026 – "Mefistofelico"
- 2026 – "Niente Panico"
- 2026 – "Me Siento Mejor"

=== As featured artist ===
- 2010 – "La parola che nessuno riesce a dire" (Marracash feat. Ada Reina)
- 2013 – "Andrea via" (Giso feat. Ada Reina)
- 2013 – "Dentro" (Stylophonic feat. Ada Reina)
- 2015 – "Cento notti" (Amir feat. Ada Reina)
- 2018 – "Bad on the Dancefloor" (Madh feat. Ada Reina)
- 2019 – "Nunca mas" (Giacomo Ghinazzi feat. Ada Reina)
- 2019 – "La noche" (Saint Ambroeus feat. Ada Reina)
- 2023 – "La vida" (DJ Ross feat. Ada Reina)
- 2023 – "Santa Fe" (Provenzano, Paul Jockey feat. Ada Reina)
- 2024 – "Ah però soda" (Moreno feat. Clementino and Ada Reina)
- 2024 – "Papi" (Wlady feat. Ada Reina)
