= Clementino =

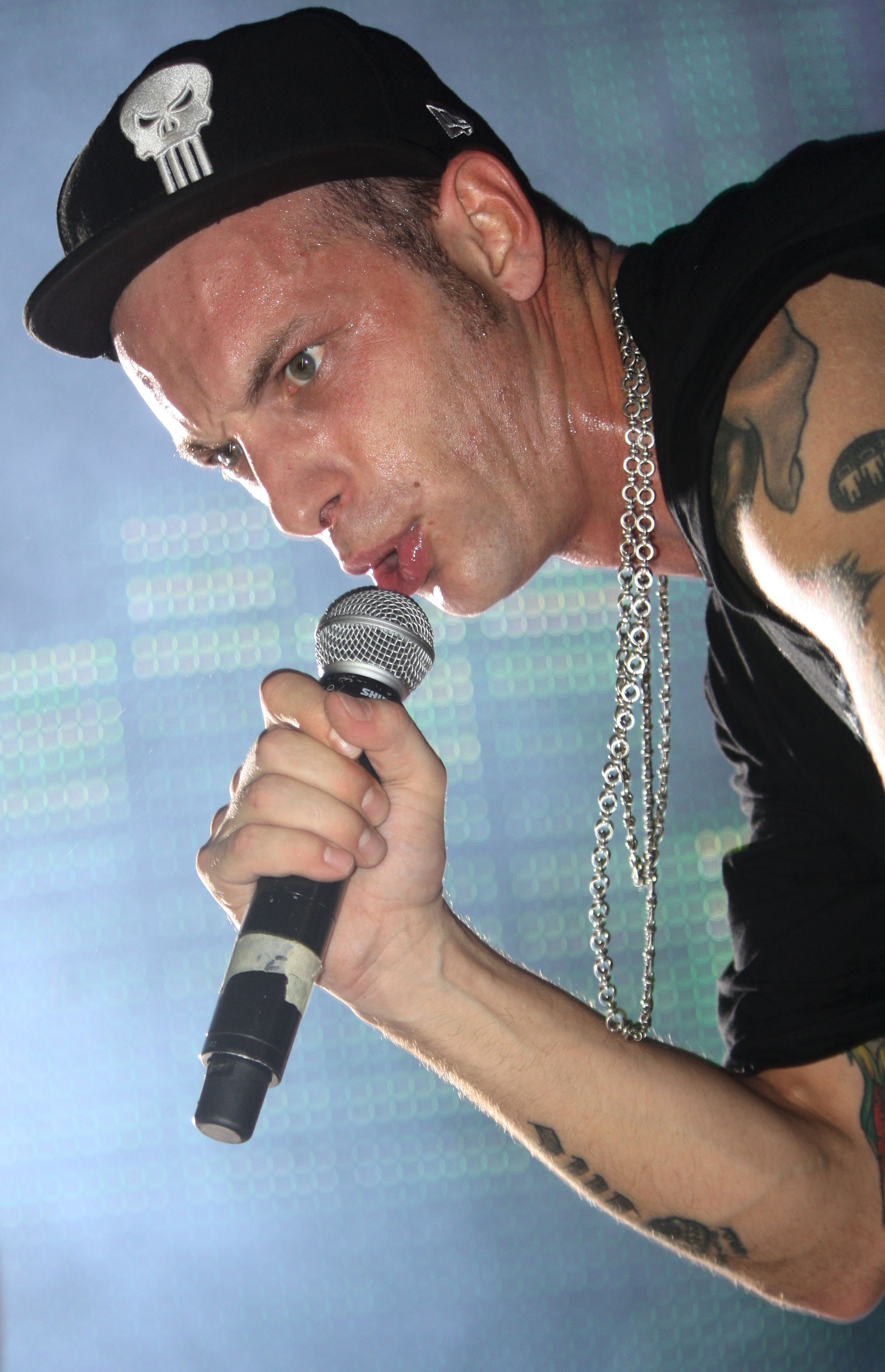

Background information
- Also known as: Iena, Iena White
- Born: Clemente Maccaro; 21 December 1982 (age 43); Cimitile, Campania, Italy
- Genre: Hip-hop
- Occupation: Rapper
- Years active: 1996–present
- Labels: Universal (2013–); Tempi Duri Records (2011–2015); Lynx Records (2006–?)
- Website: www.clementinoiena.com

"Clementino Live Theater: il rapper napoletano sbarca al Teatro Bolivar". IlPaeseFuturo. Archived from the original on July 2, 2013.

Clemente Maccaro (born 21 December 1982), known professionally as Clementino, is an Italian rapper, proficient in freestyle in both Italian and Neapolitan language. Along with rapper Fabri Fibra, he is a member of the group Rapstar, formed in 2012. After winning several freestyle competitions between 2004 and 2006, he signed a contract with the independent record label Lynx Records, releasing the debut album Napolimanicomio in 2006. Three years later, he joined Videomind, releasing IENA in 2011. In 2013 the rapper signed a contract with the record label Universal, publishing shortly afterwards Mea culpa, who had a moderate success in the motherland, reaching fourth position in the FIMI album charts and being certified a gold record.

== Career ==
=== Early years and Napolimanicomio (1996-2008) ===
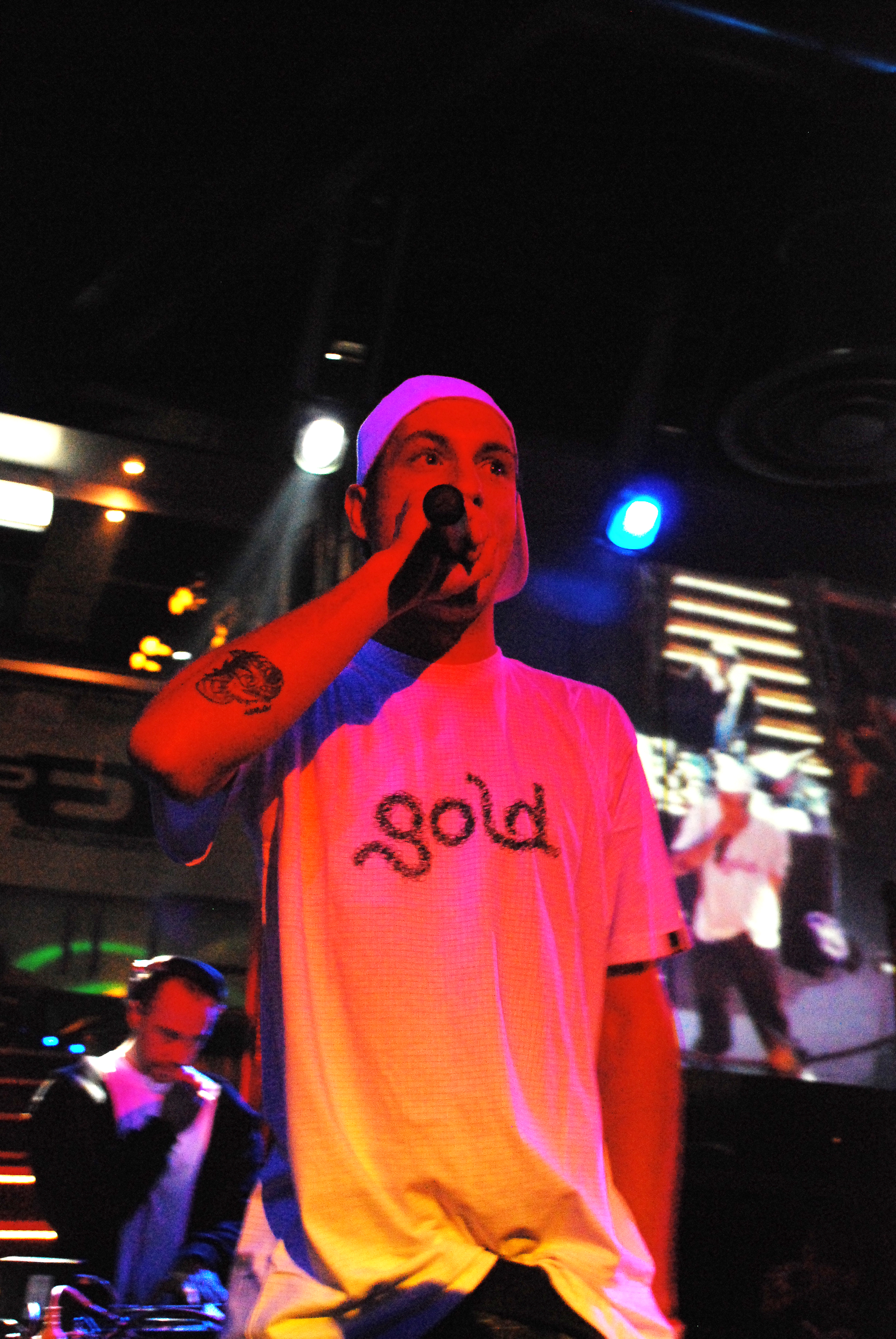
Clementino during a live performance in 2007

Born and raised in the Neapolitan hinterland between Cimitile and Nola, at the age of 14, Clementino took his first steps in hip hop right in Naples where he joined the Trema Crew and later the TCK, a Neapolitan group. Due to these first experiences, Clementino had the opportunity to refine his techniques in freestyle (a typical style of hip hop culture which consists in improvising in rhyme), thus becoming one of the most skilled artists on the national scene in Italy and winning first place in multiple competitions: the Tecniche Perfette 2004, Da Bomb 2005, Valvarap 2006 and 2theBeat 2006. He surpassed Giankarlo Ira in the first contest, who was the first place holder in the third edition of Tecniche Perfette in the final of the 2nd round; he later won the final round against Ensi, who the defending champion at the time; he had already previously defeated Clementino himself in the final in 2005.

In 2005, he took part in Napolizm: a Fresh Collection of Neapolitan Rap, a compilation released in the United States which brought together the best Neapolitan rappers. Clementino subsequently collaborated with several artists such as Malva & DJ Rex and Mastafive, obtaining a contract with Lynx Records (formerly known as Undafunk Records) for a solo album.

His first studio album, titled Napolimanicomio, was released on 29 April 2006. The album was sung in both Italian and Neapolitan, and featured collaborations with renowned artists such as OneMic, Kiave, Francesco Paura, and Spregiudicati, as well as several important local artists such as Kapwan, Emcee O'Zi, and Patto MC, achieving moderate success and increasing his national fame.

Following the release of his first album, Clementino embarked on a series of concerts that saw him perform more than 200 dates throughout Italy.

=== Videomind and "I.E.N.A." (2009-2011) ===
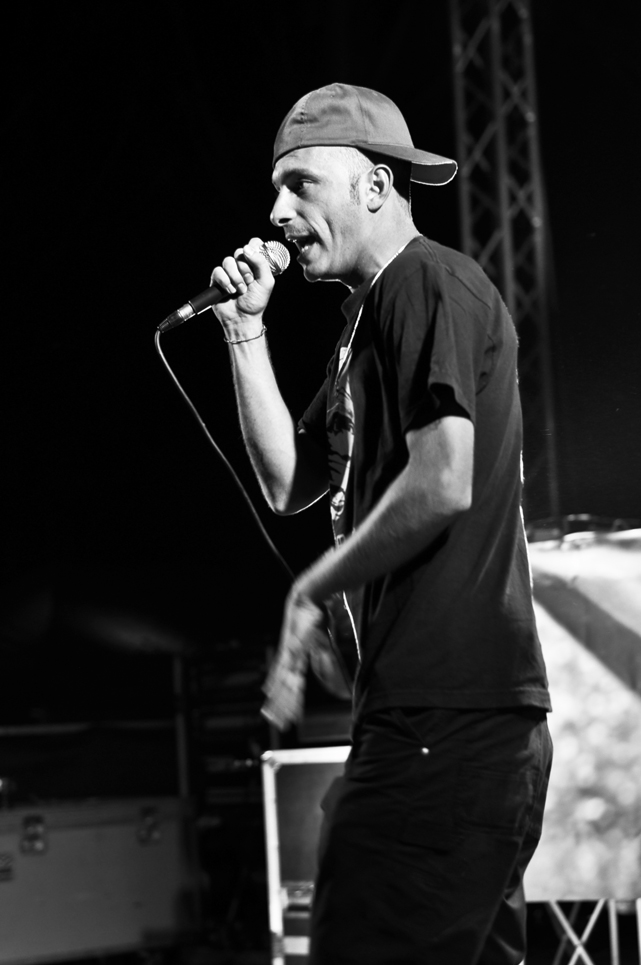
Clementino during a live performance at the Positive River Festival in 2011

In late 2009, he collaborated with DJ Tayone and the rapper Francesco Paura, birthing the group Videomind. Together, the group released the album Afterparty in 2010, the release of which was preceded by the single È normale, alongside its music video. A second single "Music Therapy" was released along with two additional videos (L'immenso and Peter Pan).

His second solo album, titled I.E.N.A. (an acronym for "Io e nessuno altro") was released on 19 December 2011. This name comes from the fact that the album is a collection of songs about himself alone. The album was preceded by the music video for "La mia musica", which had been released just over a year earlier. The name Iena (or more frequently Iena White) also derives from Clementino's alter ego, chosen to indicate the analogy between himself and a hyena, which "left the carcasses of his opponents on the ground", as he stated in an interview.

=== Collaboration with Fabri Fibra (2012) ===
On 9 January 2012, Ci rimani male/Chimica Brother was released, a double single in collaboration with the famous Italian rapper Fabri Fibra which preceded the release of Non è gratis, a project that saw Clementino alongside Fabri Fibra himself in the musical duo Rapstar, which was a partnership between mainstream hip hop and underground. On January 20, the second video from I.E.N.A. and Toxico, was released, while the third, Rovine, was released on March 4.

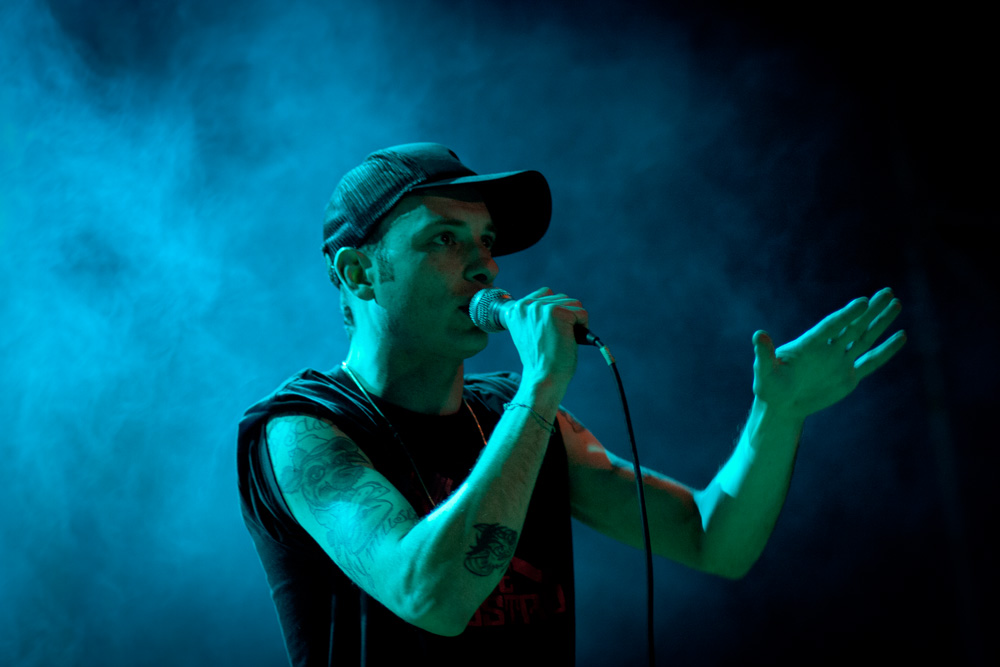
Clementino during a concert of 99 Posse in Bagnoli in 2012

From February 8 to 12 February 2012, Clementino performed in Pino Quartullo's play What Time Is It based on the 1989 film of the same name by Ettore Scola.

He appeared in a short final message in Max Pezzali's album Hanno ucciso l'Uomo Ragno 2012, at the end of the unreleased track "Sempre noi" (feat J-Ax).

On March 9, he released the single "La luce" from Non è gratis, a song entirely focused on Clementino's life, in which he talks about his regrets and all the mistakes he made as a young man. On the same day, the MTV channel aired the first season of "MTV Spit," a television program featuring Clementino competing against other rappers in various freestyle challenges.

In the following months, three more videos were released from I.E.N.A.: "Risata di una I.E.N.A.", "Funk e TheRivati" and "Animals". On September 25, Clementino took part in the Hip Hop TV 4th B-Day Party, held at the Mediolanum Forum in Assago, together with the best Italian rappers.

=== Armageddon and third studio album (2013) ===
On 12 January 2013, Clementino released his album Armageddon, featuring rapper Dope One and beatmaker O'Luwong. On February 15, he participated as an accompanist for Almamegretta on the fourth night of the Sanremo Festival 2013, hosted by Fabio Fazio and Luciana Littizzetto. For this occasion, his song "Il ragazzo della via Gluck" was performed together with Marcello Coleman and James Senese.

In May 2012, Clementino stated in an interview with Rai Radio 2 that he was working on a new album, scheduled for release in late 2012. The rapper later stated that the album's release had been postponed to 2013.

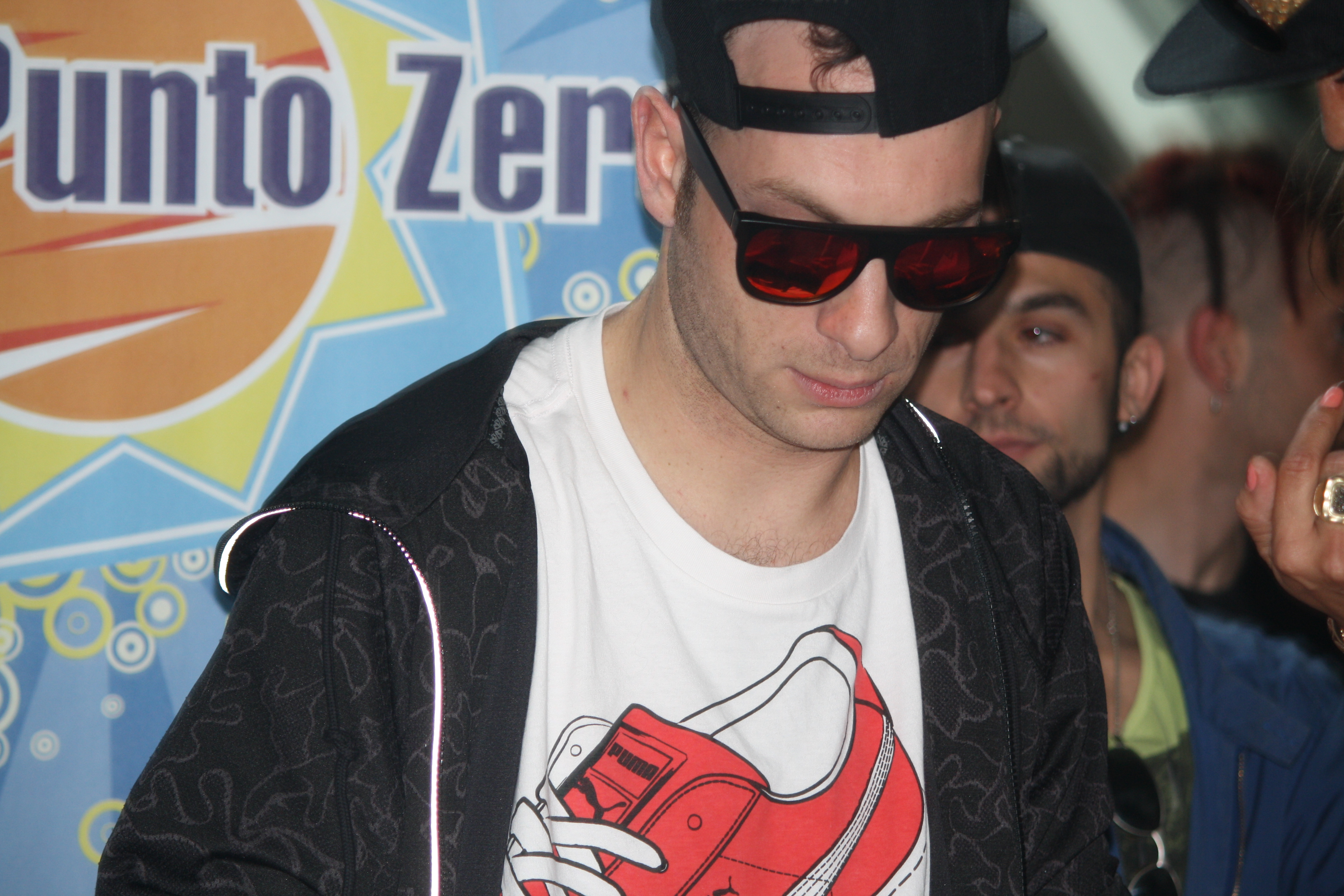
Clementino signing copies of Mea culpa at an in-store event held in Nola.

On 11 April 2013, Clementino revealed in a video that the title of his new album would be Mea culpa. The album was released on 28 May 2013 under Tempi Duri Records (in collaboration with Universal Music) and contains collaborations with rappers such as Fabri Fibra and Marracash both with singer-songwriters such as Gigi Finizio and Jovanotti. In 2013, the latter undertook a tour of across Italian stadiums which, in part, was initiated by Clementino himself. The first single released from Mea culpa is titled 'O vient and was released on 3 May 2013. The album achieved a fair amount of success, reaching fourth place in the FIMI Italian album chart.

In June, Clementino joined the Pass the Microphone project, an initiative launched by PepsiCo to promote Italian hip hop. For this project, the song of the same name was released, featuring the collaboration between Moreno, Clementino himself, Fred De Palma and Shade. On June 27 and June 30, Clementino was a guest at the Summer Festival 2013, winning in the young people category with the song 'O vient.

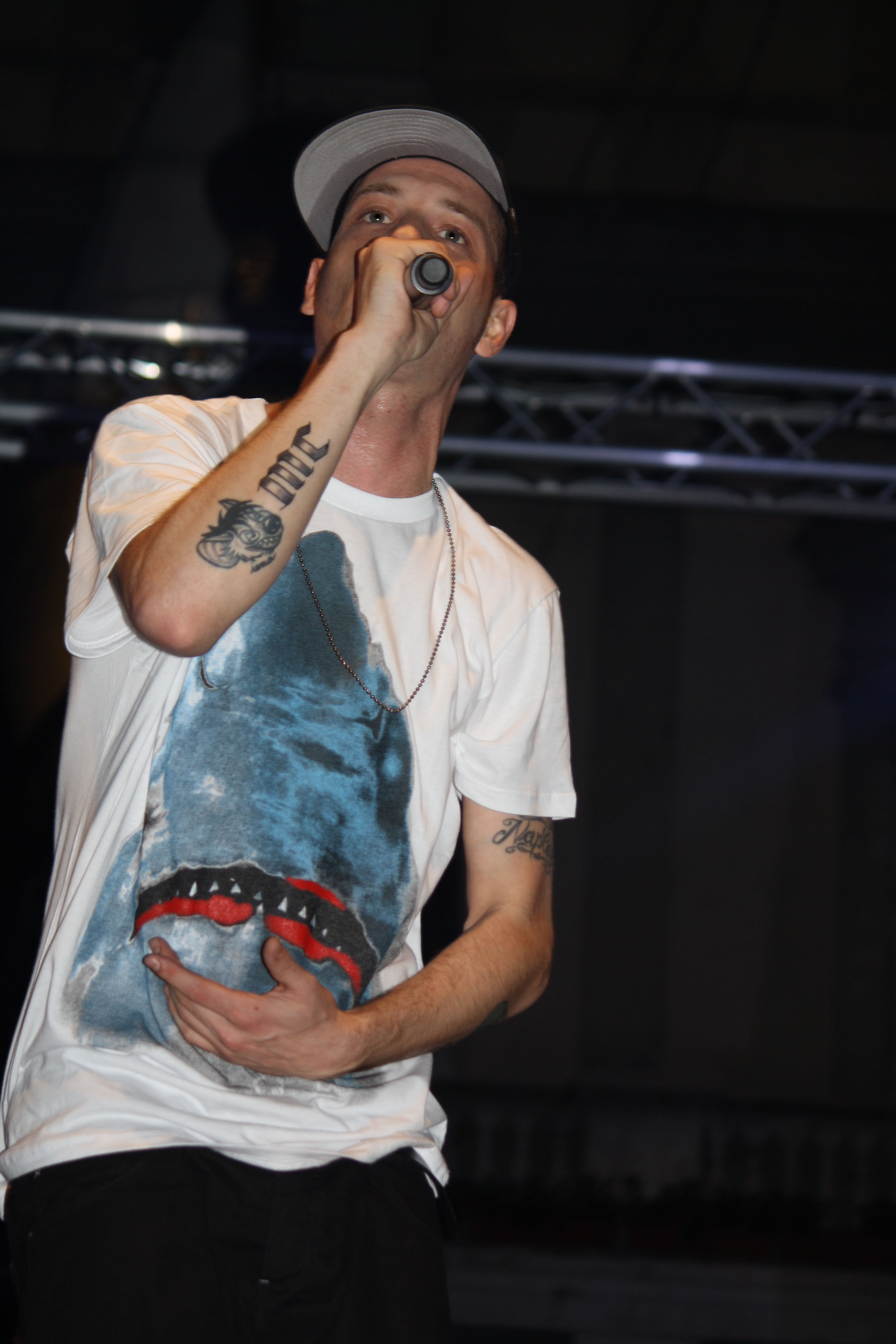
Clementino during a concert in Nola in June 2013

On July 10, the rapper began the Mea Culpa Summer Tour, a promotional tour that included some summer dates to precede his second official tour, the Mea Culpa Tour. On July 26, he was among the guests at the 43rd edition of the Giffoni Film Festival, which for the first time was open to hip hop music, inviting artists such as Ensi and Salmo. On July 31, the second single from Mea culpa was released, titled "Il re lucertola", while on August 1st the video for "Alto livello" was released. On August 12th, he opened a concert for Snoop Dogg (recently renamed Snoop Lion) at Parco Gondar in Salento. On August 24, the rapper announced on his official Facebook fanpage that he had been called up to play for the Italian National Singers Team, a soccer team made up entirely of Italian singers.

On 6 September 2013, "Fratello" was released, the third single from Mea culpa. The song features Jovanotti. On September 24, he was a guest for the second time at the Hip Hop TV B-Day Party, which was held at the Mediolanum Forum in Assago. During the night, he performed both alone and together with Ensi and Kiave in a freestyle. He also shared the stage with Kurtis Blow, one of the pioneers of hip hop music in the United States.

In October 2013, Clementino committed himself to promoting the Triangle of Life, a march against the toxic waste of the "Triangle of Death" (an area delimited by the municipalities of Nola, Acerra and Marigliano, which takes its nickname from the large amount of toxic waste present). Also in 2013, he collaborated with Guè in the song "Quei bravi ragazzi", which was included in the royal edition of his album Bravo ragazzo, released 26 November 2013.

The official music video for the song "Amsterdam" from Mea Culpa was released on 2 December 2013. It was originally released on Red Bull's official website, and was later uploaded to the rapper's official channel on December 3. That same day, the first stop on the "Mea Culpa Tour" took place at Alcatraz in Milan. Clementino promoted his album across Italy throughout the during of the tour. On Christmas Eve, he performed at the annual Christmas Concert. The concert was also attended by artists of national and international fame, such as Elisa and Patti Smith. On 28 December 2013, he opened the concert of Pino Daniele at the Palapartenope in Naples.

On 17 January 2014, the rapper published an Italian and Neapolitan version of the song "Rap God" by Eminem on SoundCloud. This was done in celebration for reaching 500,000 fans on their official Facebook page. On the January 30, Clementino released the song "No Way", made in collaboration with the Roman rapper Jesto, found on his album Supershallo 2. The fourth single from Mea culpa, "Buenos Aires/Napoli", was released on January 31 and was accompanied by its music video. He later collaborated with Deleterio on the song "Tutto a posto" (apart of his album Dadaismo), with The Night Skinny on the track "Indian Tweet Posse" and with Rocco Hunt on "Ce magnamm" (found in his album 'A verità).

On March 31, the official music video of the song "Pianoforte a vela" was released, a song denouncing the Camorra. It was included in the album Mea culpa. The song was first previewed on Correre TV. The video was entirely filmed by a group of kids from historic centers of Naples: Secondigliano, Scampia and Forcella. This was done as a part of the project "The art of hope", a project with the aim of preventing the phenomenon of juvenile delinquency, through cinema and theatre. It was filmed in collaboration with Marco Maraniello's 8mm Film Production (director of the video clip), and the Teatro Bolivar, directed by Sasà Palumbo. Clementino embraced the anti-Camorra project and adopted the video as the official video of the song.

On May 1st, the rapper took part in the May Day Concert, a concert held annually in Rome in honour of workers. On May 13, the fifth and last single from Mea culpa, "Giungla", was released, accompanied its related music video just like all prior releases. On May 27, Kepler was released; it is an album by rappers Gemitaiz & MadMan, in which Clementino was featured on the track "Drama".

On 6 June 2014, Clementino's album Mea culpa was certified gold for having reached the threshold of 25,000 copies sold. That same month, Clementino was selected by the BBC to contribute to BBC Radio 1Xtra World Cup Freestyles, a collection of freestyles performed by rappers chosen from each nation participating in the 2014 FIFA World Cup to celebrate the start of the event. To celebrate the gold record obtained by the album, on September 16, a re-edition of the album entitled Mea culpa Gold Edition was released, containing a second disc of unreleased and rare songs entitled Mea grandissima culpa. In the same month, the reality show Pechino Express was broadcast, which Clementino participated in alongside his brother and singer Paolo Maccaro.

=== Collaborations and Miracolo! (2014-2016) ===
Towards the end of 2014, Clementino announced on his Facebook page that he was working on a new studio album, titled Miracolo!. It was released on 28 April 2015. This album also features numerous collaborations with Italian rappers, such as Fabri Fibra, Guè, Marracash, Noyz Narcos and Ensi. On 16 March 2015, the video for the song "Lo strano caso di Iena White" was released, followed by "Strade superstar" which was released on the April 20. On 10 April 2015, the first single Luna entered radio rotation, followed on July 24 by "Sotto le stelle".

On 5 May 2015, Clementino released album Ora o mai più, produced by the Italian producer Don Joe. It contained among other tracks "Woodstock", recorded with Clementino and Rocco Hunt. On December 13, his participation in the Sanremo Festival 2016 was announced in the "Champions" section with the song Quando sono lontano. He placed seventh in the event's competition. On the third evening of the Festival, dedicated to covers, he presented "Don Raffaè", a song by the famous singer-songwriter Fabrizio De André. He got third in the final rankings of the episode.

=== Vulcano (2017) ===
In February 2017, Clementino participated in the Sanremo Music Festival 2017 for the second time in his career with the unreleased song Ragazzi fuori, which placed sixteenth on the final night of the event. Around the same time, the rapper announced his fifth studio album, Vulcano. It was released on March 24 and consisted of 13 songs.

That same year, he also hosted the "May 1st Concert" together with Camila Raznovich.

=== Tarantelle and other activities (2019-2021) ===
In 2019, Clementino returned to the music scene with his sixth studio album Tarantelle, released on 3 May 2019. To promote the album, the singles "Gandhi", "Un palmo dal cielo", "Hola!", "Chi vuole essere milionario?" and "Mare di notte". Towards the end of the year, Clementino released the single "Come fa?" in collaboration with MadMan, while in 2020 he collaborated with Gigi D'Alessio on the singles "Como suena el corazón" and "Buongiorno".

As of 27 November 2020, he has been a judge on the first edition of the program The Voice Senior, broadcast in prime time on Rai 1. On December 21, Clementino released the single "Partenope", in which he pays homage to the city of Naples. The song marked the artist's debut with Sony Music after years with Universal.

On 21 May 2021, he released the single Señorita, a collaboration with the singer Nina Zilli. From November 26, he was confirmed to be a judge of the second season of the program The Voice Senior.

=== Black Pulcinella (2022-present) ===
On 5 April 2022, Clementino announced his seventh studio album Black Pulcinella. It was released on 29 April 2022. The first single from the album was "ATM", released on April 8. In 2023, he is among the protagonists of the film Panorama Men together with Paolo Ruffini and Rocío Muñoz Morales. The same year, he played a cameo in the film Chi ha rapito Jerry Calà?, for which he wrote the song "S'anno arrobbate a Jerry Calà" together with Jerry Calà himself. On 14 February 2025, he participated in the Sanremo Festival 2025, duetting with Rocco Hunt and singing "Yes I Know My Way" by Pino Daniele. In September, he hosted the two-night program Suzuki Juke-Box - La notte delle hit on Rai 1 with Antonella Clerici.

== Controversies ==
In 2013, a line from the song "Amsterdam" (from his album Mea culpa) sparked some controversy. The line was addressed to L'Espresso journalist Riccardo Bocca. In the line, Clementino addressed him by making a pun on his last name; the line was "un giornalista de L'Espresso me lo prende in bocca", translating to "a journalist from "L'Espresso" takes it in his mouth". He then told him to learn to be careful with his words. The journalist responded to the provocation with an article in which he called Clementino a "child."

== Musical style ==
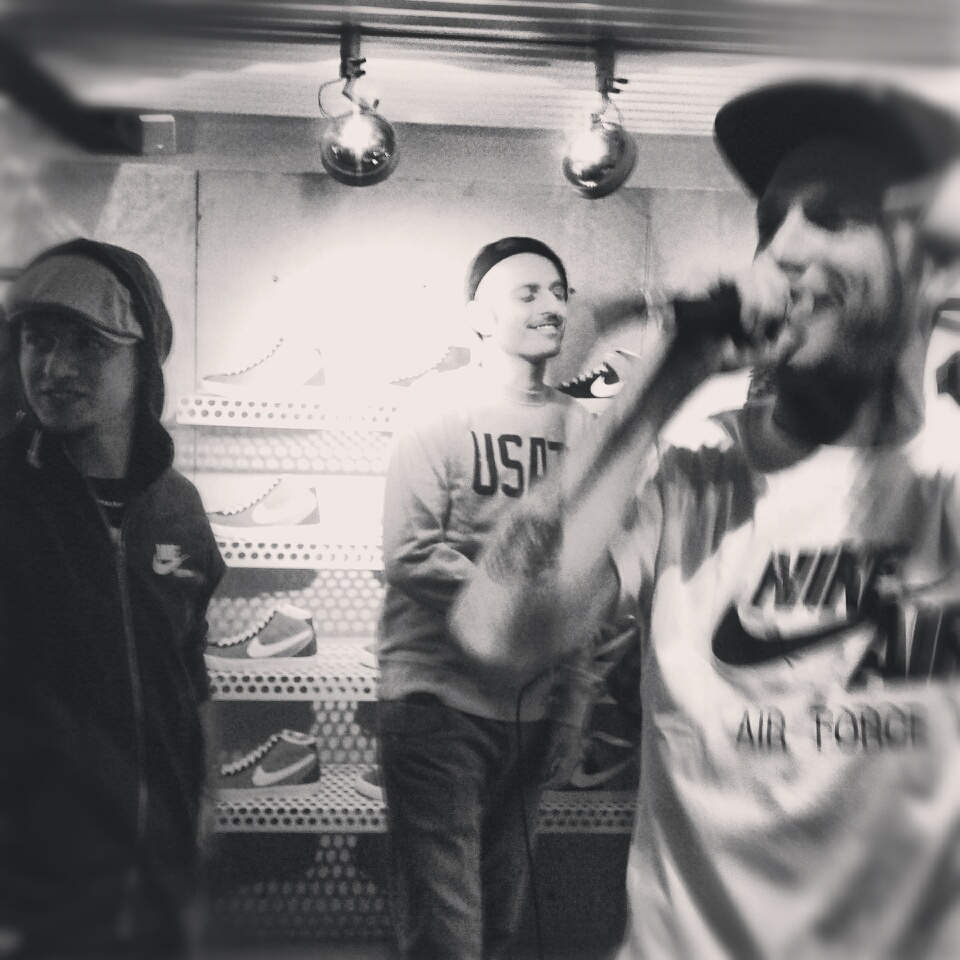
Kiave, Ghemon and Clementino

Clementino's style is primarily hip hop, although in some of his songs he varies between his classic style and fusion of hip hop, scratch, and samplings of electronic music and funk (such as in the song "Funk e TheRivati" from the album I.E.N.A.). His style underwent a major shift upon joining the electro-rap group Videomind, which blends hip hop and electronic music with many other musical genres.

Clementino is also known for his renowned freestyle skills. A demonstration of the rapper's ability in freestyle is the battle against himself performed during a Videomind concert: the challenge is a hypothetical battle between Clementino (the rapper's main stage name) and Iena White (the artist's alter ego, often contrasted with Clementino himself) performed completely alone. In this rap battle, he initiates a back-and-forth that first begins as Clementino and then as Iena White, where the latter responds to the former's disses and vice versa.

=== Influence ===
The artists who have influenced the rapper both musically and stylistically are MF DOOM, The Notorious B.I.G., Pharoahe Monch and Ill Bill (with whom he also collaborated with on the song "Hannibal Rapper", which was included in the album I.E.N.A.). In an interview he stated that most of the rappers who are present in the song "La mia musica (piece of music)" are those who have influenced him the most in his artistic career. The Italian rappers who inspired him are Jovanotti (in his early career), who in turn, in an interview for the magazine Glamour, called Clementino's rhymes "interesting", comparing him to artists such as Club Dogo and Fabri Fibra. Outside of hip hop music he has often expressed his appreciation for the well-known Neapolitan singer-songwriter Pino Daniele.

== Personal life ==
Aside from music, Clementino also has a great passion for theater, as he himself stated in an interview. This passion for theater has greatly influenced his musical career; in fact, he is known for his theatricality during concerts and freestyle.

Without theater, I wouldn't have done rap! It's something I'm very attached to and that helps me in live performances. I think I've found the right balance between memory, improvisation, voice modulation, contact with the audience and, even interpretation of the lyrics! These are things that unite my rap with my theater!

— Clementino during an interview for RapItaly

From 26 to 28 April 2013, the rapper performed in Clementino Live Theater, a show written by Clementino himself and his brother Paolo Maccaro where theater and hip hop are combined.

== Discography ==
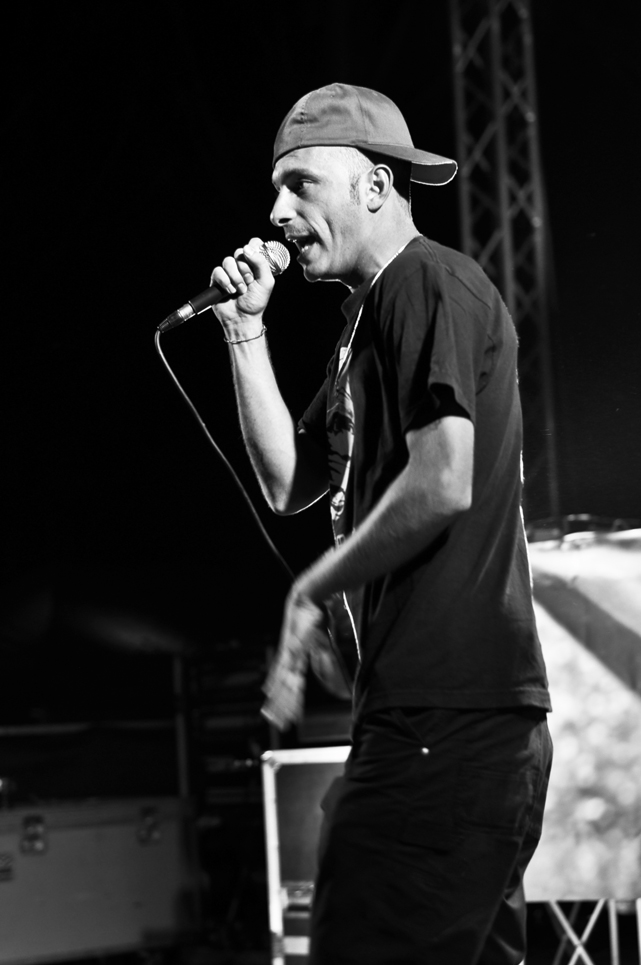
Clementino in concert in 2011

=== Albums ===
==== Solo ====
- 2006 – Napolimanicomio
- 2011 – I.E.N.A.
- 2013 – Mea Culpa
- 2015 – Miracolo!
- 2017 – Vulcano
- 2019 – Tarantelle

==== With Videomind ====
- 2010 – Afterparty

==== With Rapstar ====
- 2012 – Non è gratis

==== Compilations ====
- 2005 – Napolizm

=== Singles ===
==== Solo ====
- 2010: La mia musica
- 2012: Toxico
- 2012: Rovine
- 2013: O' vient
- 2015: Fumo
- 2019: Chi vuol essere milionario feat. Fabri Fibra

==== Collaboration ====
- 2023: Ah però soda (Moreno feat. Clementino & Ada Reina)

==== With Rapstar ====
- 2012: Ci rimani male/Chimica Brother
- 2012: La luce

== Filmography ==
Year	Title	Role(s)	Notes
2015	All Night Long	Il Cinese	
2016	Zeta: Una storia hip hop	Himself	Cameo appearance
2016	Troppo napoletano	Himself	Cameo appearance
2018	Natale a Roccaraso	Barman	
2020	Cobra non è	Himself	Cameo appearance
2021	A Bookshop in Paris	Clemente	
2022	Lamborghini: The Man Behind the Legend	Mechanical	Cameo appearance
2023	Uomini da marciapiede	Paco	
2023	Chi ha rapito Jerry Calà?	Himself	
