= Federica Carta (singer) =

Italian singer-songwriter (born 1999)

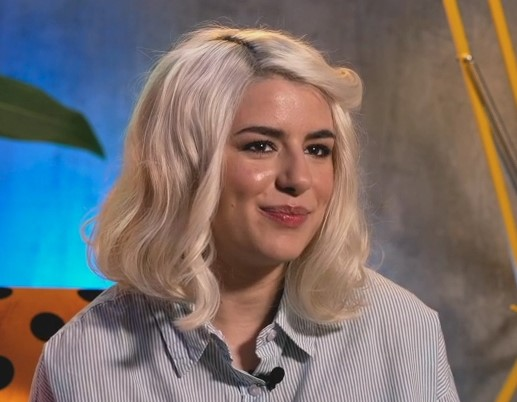
- Federica Carta in May 2023

Background information
- Born: 10 January 1999 (age 27); Rome, Lazio, Italy
- Genres: Pop
- Occupations: Singer; songwriter
- Instruments: Voice; guitar; piano
- Works: Discography
- Years active: 2017–present
- Labels: Island; Universal

Federica Carta (born 10 January 1999) is an Italian singer-songwriter.

In 2017, she came third in the 16th series of the Italian talent show Amici di Maria De Filippi. Since that time the singer has released three top-five albums and several successful singles and collaborations, selling over 360,000 copies in Italy.

Carta participated in the Sanremo Music Festival in 2019 with the song "Senza farlo apposta" together with Italian rapper Shade, and worked as a songwriter with Elisa, Laura Pausini, Federica Abbate, Roberto Casalino and Alessandro Raina. In 2023 Carta and Baby K, Marco Mengoni, record label, Keymaker records and British rapper Darkoo was unveiled by Pandora as Italy's most streamed musicians.

== Biography and music career ==
Federica Carta was born in Rome on 10 January 1999 to a family of Sardinian origin. At the age of nine she became passionate about music influenced by her father Cristiano. She took singing and piano lessons.

At the age of 17, after having participated in a number of competitions, Carta decided to seek selection for the TV show Amici di Maria De Filippi, presenting for the first time on TV three of her unreleased songs, "Sogni e verità", "People talk to me" and "Tutto quello che ho". As a member of the blue team, Federica finished in third place.

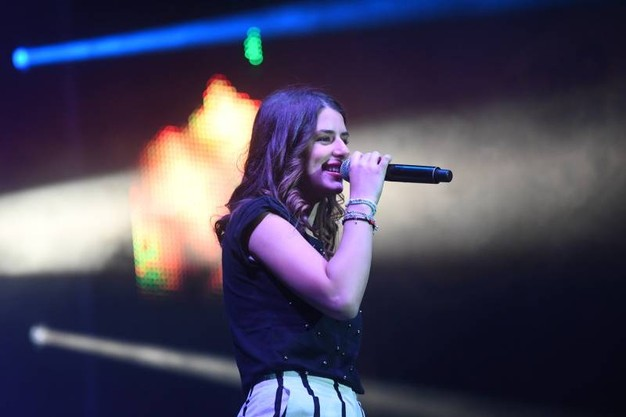
Federica Carta in concert in Bologna in 2017

On 19 May 2017, she released her first studio album Federica, produced by Andrea Rigonat for the Universal Music Group. The album has many songwriters and composers as of the team coach Elisa, Federica Abbate and Roberto Casalino. It reached third place on the FIMI chart and obtained a platinum certification. It contains songs presented to Amici: "Dopotutto" and "Ti avrei voltu dire", both certified gold records. During the summer of 2017 she performed in several festivals and she collaborated on the hit "Irraggiungibile" with Shade, achieving second place in the Italian Singles Charts and selling over 150,000 copies.

The singer tried to take participate, together with the band La Rua, at the Sanremo Music Festival 2018, but was unsuccessful. The single, titled "Sull'orlo di una crisi d'amore", was released on 23 March 2018. In January 2018, Top Music, the television version of the official Top of the Music official record chart of the Federazione Industria Musicale Italiana, was broadcast on Rai Gulp. On 1 February 2018 "Molto più di un film" was released as the leading single from her second studio album Molto più di un film, published on 23 April. The album hit the FIMI charts at fourth place. On 5 June 2018 she published the book Mai così felice (Never so happy), in which the singer talks about herself, her emotions, love and family. Federica opened four concerts of Laura Pausini during summer.

On 14 December 2018, the singer released "Mondovisione" from the soundtrack of the Michele Soavi film The Legend of the Christmas Witch. On 21 December 2018, her participation in the Sanremo Music Festival 2019 was announced with the song "Senza farlo apposta", with Shade. The collaboration peaked at number 5 in the Italian Singles Chart and was awarded a platinum certification. On 15 February 2019 her first extended play, Popcorn, was published. It debuted in third place on the FIMI's chart and became the singer's third consecutive album to reach into Top5.

On 6 March 2020, Federica released "Bullshit", the first single from her fourth album, which will be released in 2020 for Island Records.

== Musical influences ==
The singer stated during interviews that artists who influenced her are Alicia Keys, Paolo Nutini, Dua Lipa and Billie Eilish. As musical influences she appreciates pop, neo soul, R&B and soul music. The singer has described Laura Pausini and Elisa as main points in the contemporary Italian music scene.

== Discography ==
- Federica (2017)
- Molto più di un film (2018)

== Tours ==
- 2017 – Federica tour
- 2018 – Molto più di un film tour
- 2019 – Popcorn tour
- 2022/24 – Federica Carta tour estivo

== Television programs ==
Year	Title	Network	Role(s)	Notes
2016–2017	Amici di Maria De Filippi	Canale 5	Herself / Contestant	Talent show (season 16) – Third place
2018–2019	Top Music	Rai Gulp	Herself / Host	Singing competition
2018	Junior Eurovision Song Contest	Rai Gulp	Herself / Commentator	Singing competition

== Participation in singing events ==
- Sanremo Music Festival (Rai 1)
  - 2019 – 18th place with "Senza farlo apposta", paired with Shade

== Dubbing ==
Year	Title	Role	Notes
2019	UglyDolls	Moxy	Animated film
2023	Beavis and Butt-Head	Daria	Animated series (season 10)

== Works ==
- Federica, Carta (2018). Mai così felice. Rizzoli. ISBN 9788891580535.

== Awards and nominations ==
Year	Award	Nomination	Work	Result	Notes
2017	Amici di Maria De Filippi	Vodafone Award	Herself	Won	
