= MTV Spit =

Italian television series

- Genre: Rap
- Developed by: MTV Italy
- Starring: Marracash, J-Ax, Niccolò Agliardi, Marco Materazzi, Dj Tayone, Fabri Fibra, Max Pezzali, Dj Double S, Emis Killa, Dj Nais, Guè Pequeno, Mastafive, Deleterio, Max Brigante, Jake La Furia, Morgan, Don Joe, Ensi, Paola Zuckar
- Country of origin: Italy
- Original language: Italian
- No. of seasons: 3

Original release
- Network: MTV
- Release: 22 December 2011 – 2014

MTV Spit was a music program aired on MTV Italy and hosted by the italian rapper Marracash. This show focuses on freestyle battles on various current issues including rapper in the underground scene. The first season is aired from 9 March to 4 May 2012. A pilot episode, called Spit Gala, aired 22 December 2011. Besides Marracash, to debut as a presenter, there are in the role of fixed judges: J-Ax, Mastafive and Niccolò Agliardi (to which each episode will be joined by a guest judge), and the console to put the beats on which the rapper will clash race alternate Dj Tayone and Dj Double S. In the Spit Gala however the judges were, in addition to J-Ax, Fabri Fibra and the Club Dogo.

The second season of the show will be aired from 8 May 2013. Marracash was confirmed as the host, and the new judges were Morgan, Max Pezzali, Ensi and Paola Zukar.

The presenter for the third and latest season was again Marracash and it was attended by other 12 rappers from all over Italy. The judges were Emis Killa, Max Brigante and Guè Pequeno.

== Rules ==
In every episode there are three battles, and each challenge two rappers. The first two battles have a current topic to which the two contestants should try to stick as closely as possible, while the third is a free subject. Also to the first two challenges have a duration of three rounds as follows: the first two by one minute for each rapper, the third two minutes in which rappers take turns with a beat of four quarters to the head (instead of the third gala round was only one minute, and all the challenges they had this same period). The winners of the first two battles pass the turn, but the losers will have to see if the play-off, the last two rounds of two minutes, winning goes, the loser is eliminated permanently. At the end of each challenge judges will give their preference and, in the case where the judgment is equal, will be the public to decide the winner. After nine episodes of the final winner, and the title of champion, will win a cash prize of 5000 Euro.

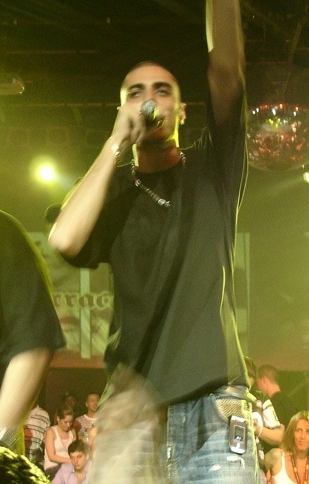
Marracash, presenter of all the editions

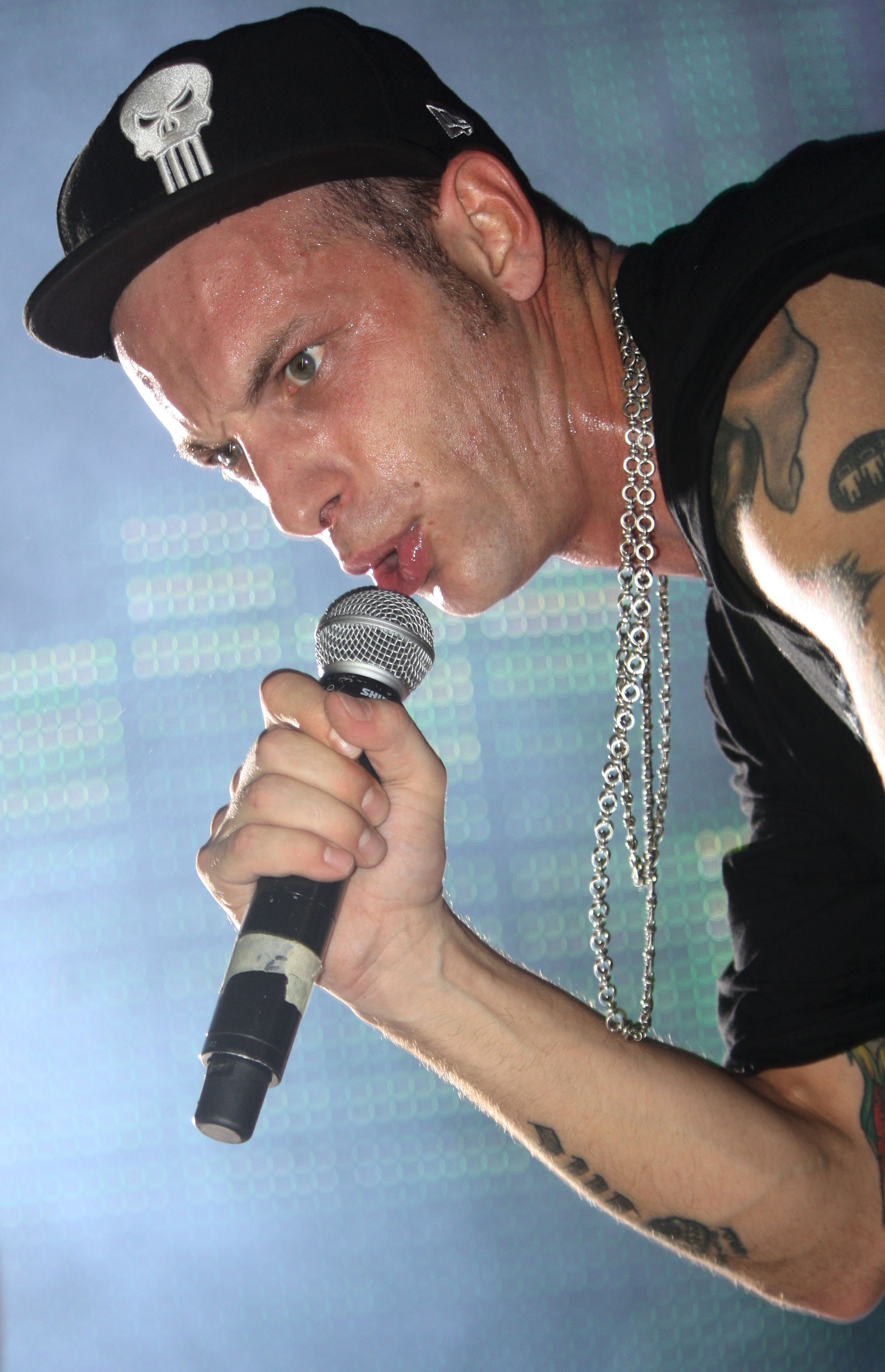
Clementino, he parteciped at the first edition

== Winners ==
Season	Year	Winner
1	2012	Ensi
2	2013	Shade
3	2014	Nerone

== Season 1 (2012) ==
The presenter is the rapper Marracash, at the debut in this role. In this first season was attended by 12 emerging rappers from all over Italy. In alphabetical order:

- Clementino
- Dank
- Dari MC
- Ensi
- Fred De Palma
- Kenzie
- Kiave
- Loop Loona
- Moreno
- Nitro
- Noema
- Rancore

== Season 2 (2013) ==
The presenter is again Marracash and the second season was attended by other 12 rappers from all over Italy. In alphabetical order:

- Anagogia
- Debbit
- Easy One
- Fat MC
- Fred De Palma
- Kenzie
- McNill
- Mouri
- Nazoo
- Nerone
- Nitro Wilson
- Shade

== Season 3 (2014) ==
The presenter is for the third time Marracash and in this season was attended by other 12 rappers from all over Italy. The judges were Emis Killa, Max Brigante and Guè Pequeno. In alphabetical order:

- Blackson
- Bles
- BLNKAY
- Dave
- Debbit
- Frenk the Specialist
- Greta Greza
- Johnny Roy
- L'Elfo
- Lethal V
- Nerone
- Nill
