= Jesto =

Italian rapper (1984–2025)

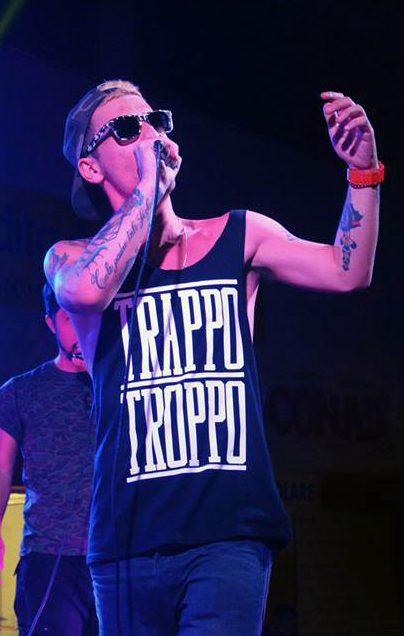
- Jesto in January 2015

Background information
- Born: Justin Rossi Yamanouchi; 25 November 1984; Rome, Italy
- Died: July 31, 2025 (aged 40) Rome, Italy
- Genre: Hip-hop
- Occupation: Rapper
- Years active: 2003–2025

Justin Rossi Yamanouchi (25 November 1984 – 31 July 2025), better known by the pseudonym Jesto, was an Italian rapper.

== Early life, family and education ==
Yamanouchi was born on 25 November 1984 to radio and television announcer and TG3 speaker Teresa Piazza and singer-songwriter Stefano Rosso. Actor Haruhiko Yamanouchi was Piazza's husband when Jesto was born; hence his surname.

== Career ==
He released his first EP Coming Soon in 2003, shortly followed by his debut album Il mio primo e ultimo disco ('My first and last record'), produced by Piotta. During the summer of 2006 he released the mixtape Radio Jesto libero Vol. 1.

In 2008, Jesto released the second studio album Estremo. Between the end of 2008 and the beginning of 2009 two mixtapes were released: Cenni di sequilibrio and Segni di squilibrio.

== Death ==
Jesto died of a heart attack on 31 July 2025, at age 40. The funeral was held on 5 August at Santa Maria in Trastevere.

== Discography ==
=== Studio albums ===
- 2005 – Il mio primo e ultimo disco
- 2008 – Estremo
- 2010 – Il Jesto senso
- 2016 – Justin
- 2018 – Buongiorno Italia
- 2019 – IndieJesto
- 2022 – Samsara
- 2023 – Ricordo il futuro
- 2023 - Samsara (Reloaded)

=== Mixtapes ===
- 2006 – Radio Jesto libero Vol. 1
- 2008 – Cenni di squilibrio
- 2009 – Segni di squilibrio
- 2009 – È la crisi! (with 3D)
- 2012 – DuemilaNonSoCosa
- 2013 – Supershallo
- 2014 – Supershallo 2
- 2015 – Supershallo 3
- 2015 – Xtremeshallo (with CaneSecco)
- 2016 – Summershallo
- 2019 – Supershallo 4
- 2024 – L'Asteroide

=== EPs ===
- 2003 – Coming Soon
- 2008 – Aspettando l'album
- 2010 – Dal tramonto all'alba EP (with DJ 3D)
- 2011 – Freestyle Life (with 3D)
- 2012 – Mamma ho ingoiato l'autotune
- 2012 – Prima della fine del mondo
- 2014 – Trappo troppo
- 2015 – Mamma ho ingoiato l'autotune 2
- 2017 – Mamma ho ingoiato l'autotune 3
- 2019 – Mamma ho ingoiato l'autotune 4
- 2019 – Mamma ho ingoiato l'autotune 5
- 2020 – LCKDWN (with DJ Dust)
- 2023 – Good Vibes
