= Moreno (singer) =

Italian rapper (born 1989)

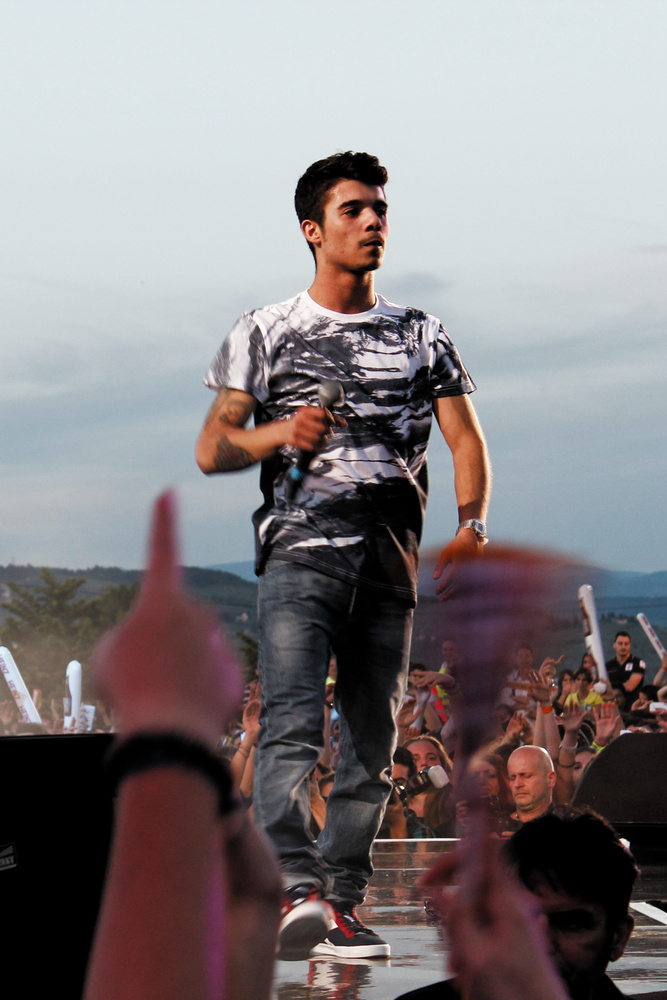
- Moreno in 2013 during the MTV Awards in Florence

Background information
- Born: Moreno Donadoni; 27 November 1989 (age 36); Genoa, Italy
- Genres: Hip hop; pop rap
- Occupation: Rapper
- Instrument: Vocals
- Years active: 2007–present
- Labels: Studio Ostile (2009–2012); Tempi Duri / Universal (2013–present)
- Website: www.morenomc.it

Moreno Donadoni (born 27 November 1989), known professionally by the mononym Moreno, is an Italian rapper. He rose to fame after winning the 12th edition of the Italian talent show Amici di Maria De Filippi.

He has recorded 3 albums and over 10 singles, selling over 200,000 copies in Italy as of 2019. He has worked with some of the most important figures on the contemporary Italian music scene like Emma Marrone, Fiorella Mannoia, J-Ax, Annalisa, Club Dogo, Alex Britti, Federica Abbate and Fabri Fibra.

Moreno participated once (2015) in the Sanremo Music Festival and won two Wind Music Awards.

== Biography ==
Donadoni was born in Genoa but his mother is from Palermo and his father is from Naples.

In February 2013 Moreno joins Amici di Maria De Filippi, becoming the first rapper to be admitted to the talent show. Below he joined the Fase Serale of the program and became part of the team led by Emma Marrone. On 1 June 2013 he was proclaimed the winner of the talent show, and was also awarded the journalistic critics' prize.

His debut album, Stecca, was released in June 2013 and, as of July 2013 has spent eight weeks at number one on the Italian Albums Chart, being certified triple platinum by the FIMI for over 120,000 units sold. His debut single, "Che confusione", peaked at number six of Italian's chart and was lately certified Platinum by the FIMI for over 30,000 units sold. Both the album and the single are the most successful records of the rapper, winning two Wind Music Awards in 2014.

His second album in studio, Incredibile, peaked at umber two of Italian Albums Chart in 2014 and was certified gold for 25,000 units sold. The record project has important collaborations, including J-Ax, Fiorella Mannoia, Annalisa, Gué Pequeno and Alex Britti. The lead single, "Sempre mai", peaked at number 25 and became media success song. In 2014 he was selected as the mentor of Amici di Maria De Filippi's thirteen edition with Miguel Bosé. Moreno participated in the Sanremo Music Festival 2015 with the song "Oggi ti parlalo così", included in the re-edition of the album Incredibile.

On 2 September 2016 Moreno published his third studio album, Slogan, becoming his third Top-ten records on the Italian Chart, while both the promotional singles do not entered on Italian Singles Chart. The album includes duets with Deborah Iurato and Federica Abbate.

In 2017 he was selected as a contestant for the reality show L'Isola dei Famosi, being eliminated at the tenth week. Since 2019 he has been called as a commentator on the sports programmes of the television network Sportitalia.

== Discography ==
=== Studio albums ===
Title	Album details	Peak chart positions		Certifications
Title	Album details	ITA	SWI	Certifications
Stecca	Released: 14 May 2013; Label: Universal Music Italy; Formats: CD, digital download	1	41	FIMI: 3× Platinum
Incredibile	Released: 1 April 2014; Label: Universal Music Italy; Formats: CD, digital download	2	—	FIMI: Gold
Slogan	Released: 2 September 2016; Label: Universal Music Italy; Formats: CD, digital download, streaming	8	—	

=== Singles ===
Song	Year	Peak positions	Certification	Album			
Song	Year	ITA	Certification	Album			
"Che confusione"	2013	6	FIMI: Platinum	Stecca			
"Sapore d'estate"	2013	17		Stecca			
"La novità"	2013	51		Stecca			
"Sempre mai"	2014	25		Incredibile			
"Prova microfono"	2014	—		Incredibile			
"L'interruttore generale (canzone d'autore)"	2014	—		Incredibile			
"Oggi ti parlo così"	2015	69		Incredibile			
"Lupin, un ladro in vacanza"	2015	—		Non-album single			
"Un giorno di festa"	2016	—		Slogan			
"Sempre mai"	2016	—		Slogan			
"Scritto nel cielo"	2017	—		"Ah però Soda (feat. Clementino & Ada Reina)"	2023	—	Non-album single

=== Moreno with AED ===
==== Studio albums ====
- 2009 – No grazie
- 2012 – No grazie pt.2

==== Mixtape ====
- 2011 – AED Revolution
- 2011 – A.E.D.L.A.N.D
- 2012 – UA Mixtape
- 2013 – Tu devi essere pazzo (with Paola & Chiara)
