= Shade (rapper) =

Italian rapper and voice actor (born 1987)

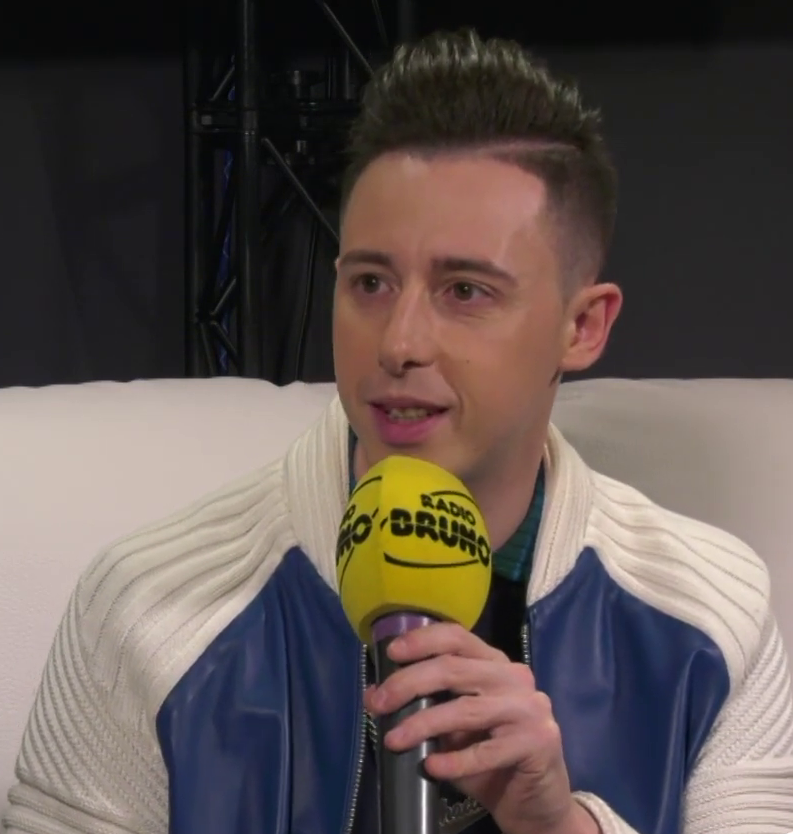
- Shade in February 2019

Background information
- Born: Vito Ventura; 10 December 1987 (age 38); Turin, Piedmont, Italy
- Genres: Hip hop; pop rap
- Occupations: Rapper; voice actor
- Instrument: Vocals
- Years active: 2005–present
- Labels: Warner Music Italy (2015–2022); Epic (2022–2025); Wow Management (2025–present)

Vito Ventura (born 10 December 1987), known professionally as Shade (Italian: [ˈʃaːde]), is an Italian rapper and voice actor.

== Life and career ==
In 2013, he won the second edition of the freestyle battle show MTV Spit and debuted with the studio album Mirabilansia (Warner Music Italy) in 2015.

Together with Federica Carta, he participated at the Sanremo Music Festival 2019 with the song "Senza farlo apposta".

As a voice actor, he dubbed in Italian several films, TV series and anime, most notably Sonny Wright in Inazuma Eleven: Ares, Ugly Dog (Pitbull) in UglyDolls, and L (Ken'ichi Matsuyama) in the live-action film Death Note and its sequels.

== Discography ==
=== Studio albums ===
- Mirabilansia (2015)
- Clownstrofobia (2016)
- Truman (2018)

=== Singles ===
- "Cambiare stato" (2014)
- "Mai una gioia" (2015)
- "Se i rapper fossero noi" feat. Fred De Palma (2015)
- "Stronza bipolare" (2016)
- "Odio le hit estive" (2016)
- "Bene ma non benissimo" (2017)
- "Irraggiungibile" feat. Federica Carta (2017)
- "Amore a prima insta" (2018)
- "Figurati noi" feat. Emma Muscat (2018)
- "Senza farlo apposta" with Federica Carta (2019)
- "La hit dell'estate" (2019)
- "Allora ciao" (2020)
- "Autostop" (2020)
- "In'un ora" (2021)
- "Tori seduti" with J-Ax (2022)
- "Pendolari" (2023)
- "Lunatica" (2023)
