= Bassi Maestro =

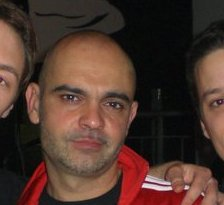
- Bassi Maestro in 2011

Background information
- Born: Davide Bassi; 3 August 1973 (age 52); Milan, Italy
- Genres: Hip-hop, Underground hip-hop
- Occupations: Rapper, songwriter, producer
- Years active: 1988–present
- Label: Vibrarecords
- Website: www.downwithbassi.com

Davide Bassi (born 3 August 1973), better known by his stage name Bassi Maestro (also known simply as Bassi), is an Italian rapper, deejay, beatmaker and producer from Milan, Italy. Bassi is one of the pioneers of Italian underground hip-hop, having started his career back in 1988.

== Career ==
Following sit-in jam sessions and gatherings, Bassi released his debut singles and became known in the Italian hip-hop scene as a DJ in the late eighties and early nineties. His first releases came in 1988 with two tracks in English, called Explicitin the Facts and Art From the Heart. In 1992, Bassi Maestro released his first demo, of eight tracks, called Furia solista. In 1995 he founded the label "Mixmen Connection" together with El Presidente, and he collaborated the following year with DJ Zeta.

Bassi worked on projects and live shows alongside DJ Gruff and Kaos One, including the first edition of Hip Hop Village in Turin in 1995. He released Contro gli estimatori, his first full-length album, which included collaborations with Tormento of Sottotono, El Presidente and La Pina on his own Mixman label.

He also produced beats for several american artists such as Coolio, Rakim, Busta Rhymes, Talib Kweli, M.O.P., Joell Ortiz, Jim Jones, Lloyd Banks and others.

In 2024 he returned with a featuring with Kid Yugi in S.X.I.C

== Discography ==
Albums

- Contro gli estimatori (1996)
- Foto di gruppo (1998)
- Classico (2000)
- Rapper italiano (2001)
- Background (2002)
- Classe '73 (2003)
- L'ultimo testimone (2004)
- Seven: The Street Prequel (2004)
- Hate (2005)
- V.E.L.M. (Vivi e lascia morire) (2006)
- La lettera B (with Babaman) (2009)
- Tutti a casa (2011)
- Stanno tutti bene (2012)
- Guarda in cielo (2013)
- Mia maestà (2017)

EPs

- The Micragnous EP (as Sano Business) (1997)
- Sushi EP (2007)
- Vivo e vero EP (2010)
- Musica che non si tocca (with DJ Shocca) (2010)
- Per la mia gente - For My People (with Ghemon and Marco Polo) (2012)
- Vieni a prenderci (with Mondo Marcio) (2013)

Guest appearances

List of non-single guest appearances, with other performing artists, showing year released and album name
Year	Other performer(s)	Title	Album
1995	La Pina	Costa caro	Il CD della Pina
1995	Tormento, Polare, Esa, DJ Zeta	Mixmen Represent	Mixmen
1996	Sottotono	Ianglediz	Sotto effetto stono
1996	Davo	Ah sì! Eh già!	Sulle soglie della follia
1997	Left Side & Lyricalz	È una cosa seria	La sola via che so
1998	Fritz da Cat	Meglio così	Fritz da Cat
1998	Cricca Dei Balordi	Fuori per il Beez	Fondazione Cracka
1999	Sottotono	Sotto lo stesso effetto	Sotto lo stesso effetto
1999	Fritz da Cat	Microphone Check 1, 2 What Is This	Novecinquanta
1999	Centro13	Fuga dalla realtà	Acciaio
1999	Lyricalz	Problemi	Brava gente - Storie di fine secolo
1999	Megatriade (Dafa, Bassi Maestro, Leftside)	La supremazia	Il Bel Paese mixtape
2000	DJ Zeta	Ah sì eh già 2000	Zeta 2000
2000	DJ Zeta	Fuori per il cash	Zeta 2000
2000	DJ Zeta	Il mio DJ	Zeta 2000
2000	DJ Zeta	Like This	Zeta 2000
2000	DJ Zeta	Fuori per il cash Remix	Zeta 2000
2002	DJ Double S	Lo capisci o no!?	The Great Adventures of DJ Double S
2003	Mondo Marcio	Brucia Marcio brucia	Mondo Marcio
2003	Microspasmi	Se voi ci capireste	13 pezzi per svuotare la pista
2003	Numeri 2	Ho bisogno d'amore Remix	La Primizia e Soulmaster Project
2004	Mondo Marcio	Sei troppo cheap	Fuori di qua
2004	DJ Shocca	Inedito	60 Hz
2004	DJ Shocca	Stupidi	60 Hz
2004	Reiser	Mother	2004 EP
2004	Zampa	Nuts	Lupo solitario
2004	ATPC	Più forte	Idem
2004	Babaman	Intro	Prima di partire
2004	Babaman	Vi siete accorti?!	Prima di partire
2004	Bat One	Sotto tiro	Riprendiamoci tutto
2005	Ape	La mia nazione	Generazione di sconvolti
2005	Mr. Phil	Rap Galactico	Kill Phil
2005	Michel	Fuori di qua	...Da lontano
2005	ATPC	Più forte Remix	Re-Idem
2005	L-Duke	Hip-Hop	Il basso la batteria eccetera
2006	Babaman	Shake Ya Body Gal	Fuoco sulle masse
2006	Babaman	Interlude	Fuoco sulle masse
2006	Amir & Santo Trafficante	Keep Prestigio	Prestigio Click Bang vol. 1
2006	Inoki	Freestyle	New Kingztape Vol. 1
2006	Zampa & Jack the Smoker	Electrorapmusic	Il suono per resistere
2006	Dynamite Soul Men	Dynamite BusDeez	Dynamite Soul 6 Mixtape
2006	Flaminio Maphia	Scambi di materiale	Videogame
2006	Mondo Marcio	Brucia Marcio brucia Remix	Mondo Marcio Gold Edition
2006	Othello	Chi ne sa e chi ne da	Cerco pace
2006	Mr. Phil	Roma Philly Connect Remix	Guerra fra poveri
2006	Palla & Lana	La vita non paga	Applausi
2007	Amir	Body Rock Remix	Vita di prestigio
2007	Luda & DJ Tsura	Mr. Slow Flow	Deadly Combination Mixtape
2007	DJ Shocca & Medda	Indietro	Struggle Music
2007	Crookers	No dubbio bro	Crookers Mixtape
2007	Mentispesse	Uidonghiva	Bang Bang
2007	DDP	Pesi massimi	Attitudine
2007	Metro Stars	To the Top	Metrotape Vol. 1
2007	MDT	Vorresti averci Remix	Sotto Zero - The Drama Tape
2007	Duellz	Pesi massimi Remix	Paranoia 2K7 The Mixtape
2007	Piotta	Giovani d'oggi	Multi culti
2007	Mike Samaniego	Bang bang	Nuova Era: Il cambiamento (The Mixtape)
2007	Evidence & Jack the Smoker	Mr. Slow Flow	Deadly Combination Mixtape
2008	Santo Trafficante	Roma Milano	Ghiaccio: il principio
2008	MDT	Vento fresco	Grado zero
2008	Principe	Non c'è perdono	R-Esistenza
2008	Amir	Siamo liberi	Paura di nessuno
2008	NoOne & Gene5 MC	Il doppio di questo	Rap PhiloSophy
2009	DJ Zeta	Bassi Freestyle	Ghetto Blaster Vol. 3
2009	DJ Fede	Quando lo vuoi	Original Flavour
2009	Principe	Non c'è perdono RMX	R-Esistenza Total Remix
2009	Jack the Smoker	24.7	V.Ita
2009	Gué Pequeno & DJ Harsh	Io non ballo	Fastlife Mixtape Vol. 2 - Faster Life
2009	Rubo	Worldwide Party	Presenta Radio Rade
2009	Matteo Pelli	900 metri	900 metri
2009	DJ Zeta	Stick'Em	Relations
2009	Michel	Soldi	Bombe
2010	DJ Myke	The Grimey Show	Hocus Pocus
2010	Mazza Ken	Hai bisogno di noi	Life
2010	Two Fingerz	Io no	Beatbox Selection, Vol. 1
2010	Emis Killa	Consapevolezza	Champagne e spine
2011	Don Joe e Shablo	Sopranos	Thori & Rocce
2011	Kiave & Macro Marco	Countdown	Fuori da ogni spazio ed ogni tempo
2011	Deos One	Finti perbenisti	Finti perbenisti
2011	Useless Wooden Toys	ABC (È facile) feat. Supa, Rido & DJ Double S	Piatto forte
2011	Jack the Smoker	Otis Freestyle	Game Over Mixtape Vol. 1
2012	AA. VV.	King's Supreme	Machete Mixtape
2012	Reka	Goin' Away	Apex Predator
2012	Zampa e Non Dire Chaz	I giorni del condor	I giorni del condor
2012	DJ Fabio B	Lettera a me stesso	∞ the EP
2012	Patto MC & Sha One	Fresh	—
2012	Sharky MC	Quando faccio yo	Un sogno di parole
2012	Mecna	Sul serio	Disco inverno
2012	Emis Killa	Più rispetto	L'erba cattiva (Gold Edition)
2012	Supa	Golden Agers feat. Rido	Indipendente Mixtape
2012	AA. VV.	Mediocracy feat. Salmo, MadMan, Enigma, El Raton, Ensi e Jack the Smoker	Machete Mixtape II
2013	Flesha & Solo Ap	Musica violenta Pt. 2	Colpo di stato
2013	Mr. Phil	Sopranos Pt. 2 feat. E-Green e DJ Shocca	Poteri forti
2013	DJ Kamo	24.7.365 feat. Ape	Changes
2013	E-Green	The Big Pay Back feat. Mistaman e DJ Shocca	Il cuore e la fame
2013	Gemitaiz	Forever True feat. Ensi	L'unico compromesso
2013	Fritz da Cat	Come ai tempi delle Posse	Leaks
2014	Loop Therapy	Sweet Baby	Opera prima
2015	A&R	Minimo mille	Solo bombe
2015	AA. VV.	Battle Royal	Machete Mixtape III
2016	Mondo Marcio	Come noi	La freschezza del Marcio
