= L'unico compromesso =

Studio album by Gemitaiz
- Released: May 28, 2013
- Genre: Hip hop
- Length: 1:02:52
- Language: Italian
- Label: Tanta Roba
- Producer: 2nd Roof, 3D, Il Tre, DJ Raw, DJ Sine, Deleterio, PK, Mixer T, Bassi Maestro, The Ceasars, Frenetik & Orang3

Gemitaiz chronology
| L'unico compromesso (2013) | Kepler (2014) |

Singles from L'unico compromesso
- 1. "Fuori di qua" Released: 13 May 2013

L'unico compromesso is the first studio album by Italian rapper Gemitaiz, released on May 28, 2013 by Tanta Roba. The album represents the rapper's recording debut after numerous independently published mixtapes and features collaborations with various exponents of the Italian rap scene, including MadMan, Salmo and Bassi Maestro.

== Promotion ==
The only compromise was anticipated by the release of the single Fuori di qua (Out of My Way, Pt. 2), released on May 13, 2013 for digital download only. The single was accompanied by an official video, released the same day.

== Track listing ==
1. 2013 (accendila) – 2:14
2. Quando mai – 2:59
3. Fuori di qua (Out of My Way, Pt. 2) – 3:29
4. Lo stesso – 3:13
5. L'unico compromesso – 2:46
6. Pistorius (feat. MadMan) – 3:59
7. La testa mia – 3:20
8. Mondo spaccato – 3:16
9. Celebrity – 4:06
10. Mettere giù – 3:27
11. K-Hole (feat. Salmo) – 3:36
12. Ti amo – 3:20
13. Occhi di vetro (feat. Ntò) – 3:16
14. Collier – 4:03
15. Lo faccio bene – 3:19
16. Forever True (feat. Bassi Maestro & Ensi) – 4:28
17. Winners & Losers (feat. Sercho) – 4:01
18. Nervemind (spegnila) – 4:00

== Charts ==
The album reached the third position of the Italian album chart.

| Chart (2013) | Peak position |
|---|---|
| Italia | 3 |
