= Guarda in cielo =

Mixtape by Bassi Maestro
- Released: 10 June 2013
- Genre: Hip hop
- Language: Italian
- Producer: Bassi Maestro, Marco Polo, Emis Killa, USA & DJ Shocca

Bassi Maestro chronology
Stanno tutti bene (2012)	Guarda in cielo (2013)	Mia maestà (2017)

Guarda in cielo is the third street album by the Italian rapper Bassi Maestro, released on 10 June 2013.

== Track listing ==
No.	Title	Producer(s)	Length
1.	"Intro"	Bassi Maestro
2.	"Davvero non posso"	Bassi Maestro
3.	"Guarda in cielo" (featuring Jack the Smoker & Gemitaiz)	Bassi Maestro
4.	"Tex skit"	Bassi Maestro
5.	"Bugie" (featuring DJ Shocca)	DJ Shocca
6.	"Prendi in mano quella penna e scrivi!"	Emis Killa
7.	"007 skit"	Bassi Maestro
8.	"Casino royale" (featuring Anagogia)	Bassi Maestro
9.	"Merda cruda per tutti"	Marco Polo
10.	"Suckers" (featuring MadMan & Medda)	Bassi Maestro
11.	"Fuori dal pattume" (featuring Lord Bean)	Bassi Maestro
12.	"Django skit" (featuring Mondo Marcio)	Bassi Maestro
13.	"Django music"	USA
14.	"Lettera a me stesso 2013"	Bassi Maestro
15.	"One More Chance" (featuring Nitro)	Bassi Maestro
16.	"Musica gratis"	Bassi Maestro
17.	"Outro"	Bassi Maestro
