= Mia maestà =

Studio album by Bassi Maestro
- Released: March 31, 2017
- Genre: Hip hop
- Length: 58:23
- Label: Com Era Records
- Producer: Bassi Maestro; Biggie Paul; Boston George; Loop Therapy; K-Sluggah

Bassi Maestro chronology
Guarda in cielo (2013)	Mia maestà (2017)	otergeS ottegorP (2017)

Singles from Mia maestà
- 1. "$$$" Released: December 15, 2016; 2. "Metà Rapper Metà Uomo" Released: March 21, 2017; 3. "Poco Cash" Released: May 10, 2017

Mia Maestà is the fourteenth and final solo studio album by the Italian rapper and producer Bassi Maestro, released on March 31, 2017. The record includes the participation, among others, of artists such as Fabri Fibra, Vegas Jones, Gemitaiz, Nitro and Cricca Dei Balordi.

== Track listing ==
Lyrics and music by Davide Bassi, except where indicated.

There are three bonus tracks limited to purchase on the iTunes platform: "Shhh!" (2:13), "Rock On" (2:24) and a completely instrumental version of "Shhh!".

1. "Ridefinizione" – 4:46
2. "Metà rapper metà uomo" – 4:05
3. "Alle poste" (skit) – 0:44
4. "Ancora in giro" – 4:02
5. "Fottuto O.G." – 4:21
6. "Non muovono il collo" (feat. Fabri Fibra) – 3:12 (Writers: Davide Bassi, Fabrizio Tarducci)
7. "Poco cash" (feat. Vegas Jones) – 2:57 (Writers: Davide Bassi, Matteo Privitera – musica: Davide Bassi, George Tsulaia)
8. "Alla radio" (skit) – 0:53
9. "Sorry" – 2:18
10. "Solo un altro inverno" (feat. Gemitaiz) – 3:05 (Writers: Davide Bassi, Davide De Luca – Producers: Davide Bassi, Loop Therapy)
11. "Nessuno può togliermi quello che ho" – 4:40
12. "Social Man Pt. 1" (Skit) – 1:22
13. "Prendi tutto" (feat. Nitro & CdB) – 3:51 (Writers: Davide Bassi, Nicola Albera, Fabrizio Nano, Maurizio Ridolfo – Producers: Davide Bassi, Paolo Saraceni)
14. "Gesù Cristo" – 2:52
15. "$$$" – 4:06
16. "Benvenuti a Milano" (feat. Lazza, Lanz Khan, Pepito Rella, Axos) – 5:32 (Writers: Davide Bassi, Jacopo Lazzarini, Francesco Caputo, Pepito Rella, Andrea Molteni – musica: Davide Bassi, K-Sluggah)
17. "Social Man Pt. 2" (Skit) – 0:49
18. "Un'altra specie"

== Charts ==
Chart (2017)	Highest position
Italy	11
