= Faccio un casino =

Studio album by Coez
- Released: 5 May 2017
- Genre: Pop rap
- Label: Undamento
- Producer: Niccolò Contessa

Coez chronology
Niente che non va (2015)	Faccio un casino (2017)	È sempre bello (2019)

Faccio un casino is the fourth studio album by the Italian singer Coez, released on 5 May 2017 by Undamento with the distribution of Sounday / Self.

Composed of twelve tracks, the album was made with the collaboration of Sine and Niccolò Contessa of I Cani, composers of most of the music, while Ceri, Frenetik & Orange3, Stabber, Squarta, Ford78 were involved in the production. Gemello, Gemitaiz and Lucci are among the guest singers.

Faccio un Casino was anticipated by four singles: the title track "Faccio un casino", released 10 March on digital platforms, "Taciturnal" and "Occhiali Scuri", released simultaneously for digital download on 18 April, and "E yo mamma", released ten days later. "La musica non c'è", whose melody was written by Niccolò Contessa, was released as the fifth single.

== Track listing ==
1. "Still fenomeno" – 2:57
2. "Ciao" – 3:39
3. "Faccio un casino" – 3:13
4. "E yo mamma" – 3:21
5. "Parquet" – 3:35
6. "La musica non c'è" – 3:42
7. "Delusa da me" – 3:17
8. "Taciturnal" (featuring Gemello) – 2:54
9. "Occhiali scuri" (featuring Gemitaiz) – 4:08
10. "Le luci della città" – 2:57
11. "Un sorso d'ipa" (featuring Lucci) – 3:30
12. "Mille fogli" – 3:19

== Charts ==
Chart (2017)	Peak position
Italian Albums (FIMI)	2

== Certifications ==
Certifications for Faccio un casino
Region	Certification	Certified units/sales
Italy (FIMI)	6× Platinum	300,000^{‡}
^{‡} Sales+streaming figures based on certification alone.
