= Useless Wooden Toys =

- Origin: Cremona, Italy
- Genres: Dance music
- Years active: 2002–present
- Labels: I Dischi De La Valigetta, EMI
- Website: uselesswoodentoys.net

The Useless Wooden Toys aka UWT are an electro dance band from Cremona, created by Riccardo Terzi e Gilberto Girardi. They collaborated with Bugo, for whom they did the remixes of Plettrofolle, Piotta, Bassi Maestro, Cristina Donà, Il Genio, Amari, Dargen D'Amico, Ghemon Scienz and Mistaman. The name of the band is a homage to the 2005 album of Jon Kennedy: Useless Wooden Toys.

== Discography ==
=== Album ===
- 2008 – Dancegum (Virgin Records)
- 2011 – Piatto forte (Time Records)

=== Singole ===
- 2009 – Teen Drive In
- 2009 – Bomba
- 2009 – Fucking business
- 2011 – Il Tirannosauro
- 2012 – Pioverà benza
