= Classico =

Classico (Italian) or Clássico (Portuguese) is a word for "classic", and may refer to:

- Classico (album), a 2000 album by Bassi Maestro
- "Classico", the second track on the album The Pick of Destiny by Tenacious D
- Classico, an Italian wine denomination
- Classico, an American brand of pasta sauce sold by Heinz
- O Clássico, a Portuguese football rivalry
- El Clásico, a Spanish football rivalry
- Superclásico, an Argentine football rivalry
