= Tutti a casa (album) =

Studio album by Bassi Maestro
- Released: 20 December 2011
- Genre: Hip hop
- Length: 68:00
- Language: Italian
- Label: Sano Business
- Producer: Bassi Maestro, A&R and DJ Shocca

Bassi Maestro chronology
La lettera B (2009)	Tutti a casa (2011)	Stanno tutti bene (2012)

Tutti a casa is the tenth studio album by the Italian rapper Bassi Maestro, released on 20 December 2011 under Sano Business.

== Track listing ==
No.	Title	Producer(s)	Length
1.	"Stanno tutti bene prelude #1"	Bassi Maestro
2.	"Mr. U R nobody"	DJ Shocca
3.	"Non è questione"	Bassi Maestro
4.	"Get retarded" (featuring Jack the Smoker & Nex Cassel)	Bassi Maestro
5.	"Runaway" (featuring Mondo Marcio)	Bassi Maestro
6.	"Tutti a casa"	Bassi Maestro
7.	"Crazy"	Bassi Maestro
8.	"Sopra la cintura" (featuring Ensi)	Bassi Maestro
9.	"Dal minimo al massimo" (featuring Ghemon, Matteo Pelli, Mecna)	Bassi Maestro
10.	"The B/The K" (featuring Baby K)	Bassi Maestro
11.	"Stanno tutti bene prelude #2"	Bassi Maestro
12.	"Come schiavi" (featuring Cali, A.M. (of La Congrega))	DJ Shocca
13.	"Reggie Hammond"	Bassi Maestro
14.	"Tu lo sai pt.2" (featuring Coliche, Asher Kuno, MDT & Supa)	Bassi Maestro
15.	"Riflessioni" (featuring Gene5 & Zampa)	Bassi Maestro
16.	"I'm nice (on the mic)" (featuring Egreen & Reka The Saint)	Bassi Maestro
17.	"Spiegare un'attitudine"	Bassi Maestro
18.	"Stanno tutti bene prelude #3"	Bassi Maestro
19.	"Non fermi questo show" (featuring Mondo Marcio, Beng & Micro)	A&R

== Link ==
Tutti a casa (album) at Discogs
