= Detto, fatto. =

EP by Gemitaiz & MadMan
- Released: October 15, 2012
- Genre: Hip hop
- Length: 24:30
- Label: Honiro
- Producers: Ombra, Shablo, 3D, Don Joe, DJ 2P, Denny the Cool, DJ Nais, PK

Gemitaiz & MadMan chronology
Haterproof (2011)	Detto, fatto. (2012)	Kepler (2014)

Detto, fatto. is an EP by the Italian rappers Gemitaiz and MadMan, released on November 30, 2012 by the Honiro Label. This is the first official release of the two rappers, as well as the second album released by the two after the Haterproof mixtape (2011). The EP consists of seven songs, including Antidoping, made together with rapper Ensi.

== Track listing ==
1. Detto, fatto. (prd. Shablo & DJ Nais) – 3:28
2. G.A.R.M. (prd. Denny the Cool) – 3:21
3. Terra/Luna (prd. Ombra) – 3:56
4. Antidoping (ft. Ensi) (prd. DJ 2P) – 3:56
5. Non cambio mai (prd. Don Joe) – 2:56
6. Sempre le 4 (prd. Don Joe) – 3:28
7. Baci al cianuro (prd. PK) – 3:25

=== Bonus tracks in the CD version ===
1. Veleno Pt. 3 (Boss Doms Rmx) – 3:34
2. La risposta (The Strangers Rmx) – 3:15
3. Haterproof (Goldentrash & Lumberjacks Rmx) – 3:30

The CD version tracks are all present in the previous project Haterproof.

== Charts ==
Chart (2012)	Peak position
Italy	24
