= Background (Bassi Maestro album) =

Studio album by Bassi Maestro
- Released: 2002
- Genre: Hip hop
- Length: 44:20
- Language: Italian
- Label: Vibrarecords
- Producer: Bassi Maestro

Bassi Maestro chronology
Rapper italiano (2001)	Background (2002)	Classe '73 (2003)

Background is the fifth studio album by the Italian rapper Bassi Maestro, released in 2002 under Vibrarecords.

== Track listing ==
No.	Title	Producer(s)	Length
1.	"Intro"	Bassi Maestro
2.	"Passo e chiudo"	Bassi Maestro
3.	"Background"	Bassi Maestro
4.	"1-2-3"	Bassi Maestro
5.	"Everyday"	Bassi Maestro
6.	"Non sappiamo"	Bassi Maestro
7.	"Hip Hop Derelicts"	Bassi Maestro
8.	"Sa No Biz"	Bassi Maestro
9.	"Status"	Bassi Maestro
10.	"Senza di te" (featuring Medda)	Bassi Maestro
11.	"S.I.C."	Bassi Maestro
12.	"Vivo rap"	Bassi Maestro
13.	"La terra trema"	Bassi Maestro
14.	"Non chiamatelo un ritorno"	Kaso
15.	"Ricordami"	Bassi Maestro

== Link ==
Background (Bassi Maestro album) at Discogs
