= Foto di gruppo =

Studio album by Bassi Maestro
- Released: 1998
- Genre: Underground hip hop, Old-school hip hop
- Language: Italian
- Label: Vibrarecords
- Producer: Bassi Maestro

Bassi Maestro chronology
Contro gli estimatori (1996)	Foto di gruppo (1998)	Classico (2000)

Foto di gruppo is the second studio album by the Italian rapper Bassi Maestro, released in 1998 under Vibrarecords.

It is considered a classic and one of the best Italian hip-hop albums of all time. The title track was certified gold by FIMI for sales exceeding the 25,000 mark.

== Track listing ==
No.	Title	Producer(s)	Length
1.	"Una sera a Basiano..."	Bassi Maestro	1:15
2.	"P.R.S. (Press Rewind Shit)"	Bosca	2:57
3.	"Click"	Bassi Maestro	0:49
4.	"Foto di gruppo"	Bassi Maestro	3:32
5.	"MC generico"	Bassi Maestro	4:27
6.	"Emcee"	Fish	4:42
7.	"Cosa resterà" (featuring Rido MC)	Bassi Maestro	4:09
8.	"Conosci il mio steelo"	Bassi Maestro	4:11
9.	"Bionic Skillz" (featuring Dafa, Left Side)	Bosca	4:00
10.	"A male" (featuring Davo)	Bassi Maestro	4:48
11.	"Il tipo di persona"	Hakeem	3:40
12.	"Sano What?!?" (featuring Cricca dei Balordi)	DJ Zeta	4:22
13.	"Dal tramonto all'alba" (featuring Supa)	Bassi Maestro	3:40
14.	"Family & Business" (featuring "Poeti Maledetti" (Tormento & Fede MC))	Bosca	3:51
15.	"Buoni propositi"	DJ Zeta	3:18
16.	"Conosci il mio steelo (remix)"	Vez, DJ Vigor	3:57
Total length:			57:38
