= La lettera B =

Studio album by Bassi Maestro, Babaman
- Released: 2009
- Genre: Raggamuffin, Pop rap, Reggae, Rhythm and blues, Hip hop italiano
- Language: Italian
- Producer: Bassi Maestro

Bassi Maestro, Babaman chronology
V.E.L.M. (Vivi e lascia morire) (2006)	La lettera B (2009)	Tutti a casa (2011)

La lettera B is a studio album by the Italians rappers Bassi Maestro and Babaman, released in 2009.

== Track listing ==
No.	Title	Producer(s)	Length
1.	"Microphone Champions"	Bassi Maestro
2.	"Bam Bam"	Bassi Maestro
3.	"Cosa farei per te"	Bassi Maestro
4.	"Se morissi lunedì" (featuring Vacca)	Bassi Maestro
5.	"Lonely people"	Bassi Maestro
6.	"Briciole"	Bassi Maestro
7.	"Skit"	Bassi Maestro
8.	"Gyal Dem A Go Mad"	Bassi Maestro
9.	"Bye bye"	Bassi Maestro
10.	"One Love"	Bassi Maestro
11.	"Ad ogni costo" (featuring Supa & Ensi)	Bassi Maestro
12.	"Non lo so"	Bassi Maestro
13.	"Svegliati"	Bassi Maestro
14.	"Il mio modo"	Bassi Maestro

== Link ==
La lettera B at Discogs
