= Classe '73 =

Studio album by Bassi Maestro
- Released: 2003
- Genre: Hip hop
- Language: Italian
- Label: Vibrarecords
- Producer: Bassi Maestro, FT3, Kup, DJ Shocca, Hakeem, Mace, DJ Zeta

Bassi Maestro chronology
| Background (2002) | Classe '73 (2003) | L'ultimo testimone (2004) |

Classe '73 is the sixth studio album by the Italian rapper Bassi Maestro, released in 2003 under Vibrarecords.

== Track listing ==
| No. | Title | Producer(s) | Length |
|---|---|---|---|
| 1. | "Vinco io" | FT3 |
| 2. | "Tu lo sai" | Kup |
| 3. | "Glory and Frustration" | DJ Shocca |
| 4. | "1-2-3 pt. 2" | Hakeem |
| 5. | "Goditi la vita" (featuring Rido MC) | FT3 |
| 6. | "Giorni matti" (featuring Ape & Zampa) | Bassi Maestro |
| 7. | "Il segreto" | DJ Zeta |
| 8. | "Smiling Faces" | Mace |
| 9. | "Cosa succede?! (skit)" | Bassi Maestro |
| 10. | "Cosa succede?!" (featuring Supa) | Bassi Maestro |
| 11. | "The Cognac Sipper" | Hakeem |
| 12. | "La vita è maledetta" | DJ Zeta |
| 13. | "Giuda (The Bad Seed)" (featuring FK) | Bassi Maestro |
| 14. | "Classe '73" | DJ Shocca |
| 15. | "The Show Off (skit) (bonus track)" | Bassi Maestro |
| 16. | "The Show Off (bonus track)" (featuring Rido MC) | Bassi Maestro |

== Link ==
Classe '73 at Discogs
