= Seven: The Street Prequel =

Mixtape by Bassi Maestro
- Released: 2004
- Genre: Hip hop
- Language: Italian
- Label: Sano Business
- Producer: Bassi Maestro, DJ Yaner

Bassi Maestro chronology
| L'ultimo testimone (2004) | Seven: The Street Prequel (2004) | Hate (2005) |

Seven: The Street Prequel is the first mix tape by the Italian rapper Bassi Maestro, released in 2004 under Sano Business.

== Track listing ==
| No. | Title | Producer(s) | Length |
|---|---|---|---|
| 1. | "Intro" | Bassi Maestro | 2:56 |
| 2. | "Gli ultimi testimoni" (featuring Mistaman) | Bassi Maestro | 2:46 |
| 3. | "L'ingranaggio (Remix)" | Bassi Maestro | 3:32 |
| 4. | "The Incredible Cock Dee" | Bassi Maestro | 3:22 |
| 5. | "Rezpekt" (featuring Jack the Smoker) | Bassi Maestro | 3:05 |
| 6. | "Musical Mafia (Remix)" (featuring Stokka & Madbuddy) | Bassi Maestro | 3:47 |
| 7. | "La mia posse è troppo larga" (featuring Cricca dei Balordi) | Bassi Maestro | 3:39 |
| 8. | "Beiootchh!!!" (featuring Mondo Marcio) | Bassi Maestro | 3:19 |
| 9. | "Parli di" (featuring Mondo Marcio) | Bassi Maestro | 3:48 |
| 10. | "Time's Up" | Bassi Maestro | 2:05 |
| 11. | "S.A.I.C" (featuring Fabri Fibra) | DJ Yaner | 4:45 |
| 12. | "2 di notte" (featuring Mondo Marcio & Jack the Smoker) | Bassi Maestro | 3:20 |
| 13. | "South-O-Biz (skit)" | Bassi Maestro | 3:41 |
| 14. | "Fuori dal coro (short version)" (featuring Cricca dei Balordi) | Bassi Maestro | 2:48 |
| Total length: | | | 47:00 |
