= Rapper italiano =

Studio album by Bassi Maestro
- Released: 2001
- Genre: Hip Hop
- Language: Italian
- Label: Sano Business/Vibrarecords
- Producer: Bassi Maestro

Bassi Maestro chronology
Classico (2000)	Rapper italiano (2001)	Background (2002)

Rapper italiano is the fourth studio album by the Italian rapper Bassi Maestro, released in 2001 under Sano Business/Vibrarecords.

== Track listing ==
No.	Title	Producer(s)	Length
1.	"Skit (intro)"	Bassi Maestro	01:08
2.	"Rapper italiano"	Bassi Maestro	03:25
3.	"Per i miei gorilla" (featuring Cricca dei Balordi)	Bassi Maestro	03:38
4.	"Skit (strumental)"	Bassi Maestro	00:18
5.	"Meritano questo"	Bassi Maestro	03:51
6.	"Lo capisci o no?!?"	DJ Double S	02:42
7.	"Jeep Music"	Bassi Maestro	03:32
8.	"Skit (intro problem)"	Bassi Maestro	00:41
9.	"Problemi pt. 2" (featuring Lyricalz & G.Quagliano)	Bassi Maestro	03:49
10.	"The Shit Dropper" (featuring Rido MC)	Bassi Maestro	04:19
11.	"Busdiggy"	Men In Skretch	02:23
12.	"La sigla (Sano Business)"	Bassi Maestro	03:31
13.	"Skit"	Bassi Maestro
14.	"Come ai vecchi tempi" (featuring Davo)	Bassi Maestro	05:19
15.	"Skit (la benedizione)"	Bassi Maestro	03:12
16.	"Eight Bars" (featuring Tension, Biko, Kaso, Bruno, Mastino, Phra LC & Mistaman)	Bassi Maestro	00:29
17.	"2h10 (da dentro)" (featuring Cricca dei Balordi)	Bassi Maestro, Tormento, Medda	03:56

== Link ==
Rapper italiano at Discogs

Vibrarecords
