= Kepler (Gemitaiz & MadMan album) =

Studio album by Gemitaiz & MadMan
- Released: May 27, 2014
- Genre: Hip hop
- Length: 1:00:16
- Language: Italian
- Label: Tanta Roba
- Producer: Deleterio, PK, Ombra, Il Tre, Frenetik & Orang3, SineOne, Don Joe, Dario Leone, 3D, Mace, Dyo, Sonny Carson

Gemitaiz & MadMan chronology
Detto, fatto. (2012)	Kepler (2014)	Scatola nera (2019)

Singles from Kepler
- 1. "Non se ne parla" Released: 2 April 2014; 2. "Haterproof 2" Released: 17 May 2014; 3. "Instagrammo" Released: 30 May 2014

Kepler is a studio album by Italian rappers Gemitaiz and MadMan, released on 27 May 2014 by Tanta Roba. This album follows on from previous releases Haterproof (2011) and Detto, fatto. (2012), always born from the collaboration of the two artists. The disc contains songs recorded together with various rappers such as Gué Pequeno, Clementino and Jay Reaper (member of the Dutch hip hop group Dope D.O.D).

== Promotion ==
Kepler was anticipated by the release of the single Non se ne parla, released on 2 April 2014 for digital download only and accompanied by the relative video clip two days later.

This was followed by the publication of the video clip of the song Haterproof 2 (sequel of Haterproof), released on 13 May, and the second single Instagrammo, which entered radio rotation starting 30 May. The relative video clip was instead released on 2 July.

== Issues ==
During the registration of the album, Gemitaiz was arrested for drug dealing and illegal possession of marijuana, ketamine and hashish on January 29, 2014. After the court hearing on February 11, the rapper was placed under house arrest for 1 year and ten months in his mother's house, but he soonely got out thanks to the hashtag #freegemitaiz, that thousands of fans tweeted out on the Twitter platform.

== Track listing ==
1. Il giorno del giudizio – 2:10 (Davide De Luca, Pierfrancesco Botrugno, Piermarco Gianotti)
2. Non se ne parla – 3:43 (Davide De Luca, Pierfrancesco Botrugno, Filippo Gallo)
3. Sigarette – 3:56 (Davide De Luca, Pierfrancesco Botrugno, Marco De Pascale, Florian Sergola)
4. No Comment – 3:08 (Davide De Luca, Pierfrancesco Botrugno, Emiliano Giambelli, Marco De Pascale)
5. Zitto e guarda – 3:51 (Davide De Luca, Pierfrancesco Botrugno, Florian Sergola)
6. Blue Sky – 3:07 (Davide De Luca, Pierfrancesco Botrugno, Filippo Gallo)
7. Instagrammo (feat. Coez) – 4:21 (Davide De Luca, Pierfrancesco Botrugno, Silvano Albanese, Daniele Mungai, Daniele Dezi)
8. Smokin' Aces – 3:28 (Davide De Luca, Pierfrancesco Botrugno, Maurizio Pisciottu, Alfonso Climenti)
9. Sempre in giro (feat. Gué Pequeno) – 5:07 (Davide De Luca, Pierfrancesco Botrugno, Cosimo Fini, Luigi Florio, Dario Leone)
10. Haterproof 2 – 3:07 (Davide De Luca, Pierfrancesco Botrugno, Filippo Gallo)
11. Il sesto elemento – 3:08 (Davide De Luca, Pierfrancesco Botrugno, Filippo Gallo)
12. Eutanasia (feat. Jake La Furia) – 5:09 (Davide De Luca, Pierfrancesco Botrugno, Francesco Vigorelli, Davide D'Onofrio)
13. Black Mirror (feat. Jay Reaper) – 3:40 (Davide De Luca, Pierfrancesco Botrugno, Jannes Lelieveld, Daniele Mungai, Daniele Dezi)
14. Drama (feat. Clementino) – 4:13 (Davide De Luca, Pierfrancesco Botrugno, Clemente Maccaro, Simone Benussi)
15. Diario di bordo – 4:03 (Davide De Luca, Pierfrancesco Botrugno, Marco De Pascale)
16. I Don't Care – 4:05 (Davide De Luca, Pierfrancesco Botrugno, Stefano Fantin)

=== Bonus tracks in the Gold Edition ===
1. Disco d'oro (feat. DJ Gengis) – 2:33
2. Instagrammo (feat. Coez) (Shablo Remix) – 4:38 (Davide De Luca, Pierfrancesco Botrugno, Silvano Albanese, Daniele Mungai, Daniele Dezi)
3. Haterproof 2 (Aquadrop Remix) – 3:18 (Davide De Luca, Pierfrancesco Botrugno, Filippo Gallo)
4. Il giorno del giudizio (Dyo Remix) – 2:14 (Davide De Luca, Pierfrancesco Botrugno, Piermarco Gianotti)
5. Black Mirror (feat. Jay Reaper) (Sine Remix) – 3:30 (Davide De Luca, Pierfrancesco Botrugno, Jannes Lelieveld, Daniele Mungai, Daniele Dezi)
6. Non se ne parla (Stabber Remix) – 3:32 (Davide De Luca, Pierfrancesco Botrugno, Filippo Gallo)
7. Drama (feat. Clementino) (Ombra Remix) – 4:28 (Davide De Luca, Pierfrancesco Botrugno, Clemente Maccaro, Simone Benussi)
8. Albe nere (Deleterio feat. Gemitaiz & MadMan) – 3:17
9. Ghetto Guetta (Crookers feat. Gemitaiz & MadMan) – 3:06

== Charts ==
The album reached the top of the Italian album chart, being certified gold by the FIMI for reaching the threshold of 25,000 copies sold.

Chart (2014)	Peak position
Italy	1
