= L'ultimo testimone =

Studio album by Bassi Maestro
- Released: 19 November 2004
- Genre: Hip hop
- Language: Italian
- Label: Vibrarecords
- Producer: Bassi Maestro, FT3, Kup, DJ Zeta, Mr. Phil, Jack the Smoker, Mondo Marcio, Fish, Rubo and Goedi

Bassi Maestro chronology
Classe '73 (2003)	L'ultimo testimone (2004)	Seven: The Street Prequel (2004)

L'ultimo testimone is the seventh studio album by the Italian rapper Bassi Maestro, released on 19 November 2004 under Vibrarecords.

== Track listing ==
No.	Title	Producer(s)	Length
1.	"Per me"	Bassi Maestro
2.	"Fuori dal coro" (featuring Cricca dei Balordi)	DJ Zeta
3.	"Live mc's"	Bassi Maestro
4.	"Lo stesso posto"	FT3
5.	"Sono io" (featuring Mondo Marcio)	Jack the Smoker
6.	"Fonzie"	Bassi Maestro
7.	"Dangerous" (featuring Club Dogo & Mondo Marcio)	Mr. Phil
8.	"L'ingranaggio"	Bassi Maestro
9.	"Fish" (featuring Rido MC)	Fish
10.	"Capirai"	Rubo
11.	"Figlio di puttana" (featuring Jack the Smoker)	Mondo Marcio
12.	"Yeah" (featuring Cricca Dei Balordi & Mondo Marcio)	Bassi Maestro
13.	"Mostra un po' d'amore" (featuring Frank Siciliano)	Goedi
14.	"Non importa"	Kup

== Link ==
L'ultimo testimone at Discogs
