= Contro gli estimatori =

Studio album by Bassi Maestro
- Released: 1996
- Genre: Underground hip hop
- Language: Italian
- Label: Mix Men
- Producer: Bassi Maestro

Bassi Maestro chronology
Contro gli estimatori (1996)	Foto di gruppo (1998)

Contro gli estimatori is the first studio album by the Italian rapper Bassi Maestro, released in 1996 under Mix Men Production, Bassi's label.

== Track listing ==
No.	Title	Producer(s)	Length
1.	"Gli estimatori (intro)"	Bassi Maestro
2.	"Meglio riconoscere"	Bassi Maestro
3.	"Bella Bassi"	Bassi Maestro
4.	"Musica da camera"	Bassi Maestro
5.	"Piccolo Bassi" (featuring La Pina)	Bassi Maestro
6.	"Ad occhi aperti" (featuring Tormento)	Bassi Maestro
7.	"It's like that Y'All..."	Bassi Maestro
8.	"Rappresento per il fine settimana" (featuring Esa)	Bassi Maestro
9.	"Puoi sentirlo"	Bassi Maestro
10.	"La spremuta col caffè"	Bassi Maestro
11.	"Mettiti a sedere"	Bassi Maestro
12.	"Niente amore"	Bassi Maestro
13.	"Gli estimatori (outro)"	Bassi Maestro
14.	"Tempo di cazzeggio"	Bassi Maestro
