= V.E.L.M. (Vivi e lascia morire) =

Studio album by Bassi Maestro
- Released: 2006
- Genre: Hip hop
- Language: Italian
- Label: Sano Business
- Producer: Bassi Maestro, Fat Fat Corfunk, Ill Freddo, Mace and Mr. Phil

Bassi Maestro chronology
Hate (2005)	V.E.L.M. (Vivi e lascia morire) (2006)	La lettera B (2009)

V.E.L.M. (Vivi e lascia morire) is the ninth studio album by the Italian rapper Bassi Maestro, released in 2006 under Sano Business.

== Track listing ==
No.	Title	Producer(s)	Length
1.	"Vivi e lascia morire"	Bassi Maestro
2.	"Keep Comin' Back"	Bassi Maestro
3.	"Ah-ah-aahh!!"	Bassi Maestro
4.	"Nasty Bars" (Fat Fat Corfunk)	Fat Fat Corfunk
5.	"Non cambio mai"	Bassi Maestro
6.	"Nella notte" (G-Max, Don Joe & Daniele Vit)	Bassi Maestro
7.	"Are You Ready?" (Ghemon Scienz, Kiave & Medda)	Bassi Maestro
8.	"Cock 'n' Smizzle Pt. 1"	Ill Freddo
9.	"Cock 'n' Smizzle Pt. 2" (featuring Jack the Smoker)	Bassi Maestro
10.	"Cock 'n' Smizzle Pt. 3"	Mace
11.	"Cock 'n' Smizzle Pt. 4" (featuring Jack the Smoker)	Bassi Maestro
12.	"100%" (Amir, Mr. Phil & Supa)	Mr. Phil
13.	"4, 3, 2, 1" (featuring Mentispesse)	Bassi Maestro
14.	"Questa gente" (featuring Asher Kuno & Bat One)	Bassi Maestro
15.	"To the Top" (featuring Babaman & MetroStars)	Bassi Maestro
16.	"The Real Moneymaker"	Bassi Maestro
17.	"Tu smetti" (featuring OneMic)	Bassi Maestro
18.	"Vorresti averci" (featuring Coliche, MDT & Rido MC)	Bassi Maestro
19.	"Lontano da qui (bonus track)" (featuring Alessio Beltrami)	Bassi Maestro

== Link ==
V.E.L.M. (Vivi e lascia morire) at Discogs
