= È sempre bello =

Studio album by Coez
- Released: 29 March 2019
- Length: 32:46
- Label: Carosello

Coez chronology
| Faccio un casino (2017) | È sempre bello (2019) | Volare (2021) |

È sempre bello is the fifth studio album by Italian singer-songwriter Coez, released on 29 March 2019 by Carosello.

== Track listing ==
| No. | Title | Length |
|---|---|---|
| 1. | "Mal di gola" | 2:51 |
| 2. | "È sempre bello" | 3:23 |
| 3. | "Catene" | 2:55 |
| 4. | "Domenica" | 3:21 |
| 5. | "Fuori di me" | 4:10 |
| 6. | "La tua canzone" | 3:12 |
| 7. | "Gratis" | 3:35 |
| 8. | "Ninna nanna" | 2:23 |
| 9. | "Vai con Dio" | 3:07 |
| 10. | "Aeroplani" | 3:49 |

== Charts ==
| Chart (2019) | Peak position |
|---|---|
| Italian Albums (FIMI) | 1 |

== Certifications ==
Certifications for È sempre bello
| Region | Certification | Certified units/sales |
|---|---|---|
| Italy (FIMI) | 3× Platinum | 150,000^{‡} |
^{‡} Sales+streaming figures based on certification alone.
