= Coez =

Italian rapper (born 1983)

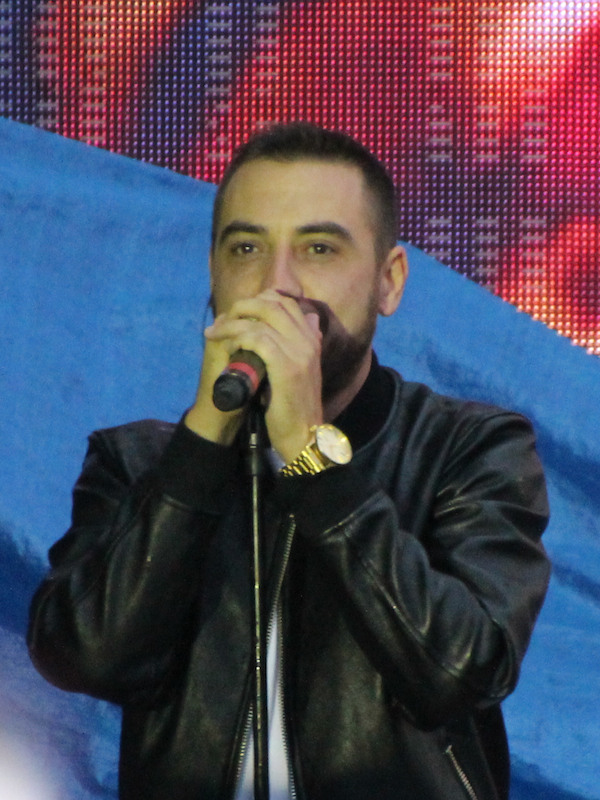
- Coez in 2015

Background information
- Also known as: Silvano Albanese
- Born: 11 July 1983 (age 43); Nocera Inferiore, Campania, Italy
- Genres: Hip hop
- Occupations: Singer-songwriter; rapper
- Years active: 2002–present
- Label: Carosello

Silvano Albanese (born 11 July 1983), known professionally as Coez, is an Italian singer-songwriter and rapper.

== Career ==
Born in Nocera Inferiore, in the province of Salerno, Coez grew up in Rome. He studied comedy at Scuola Cinematografica and his first musical project was Circolo Vizioso in collaboration with Franz and Nicco, a hip hop collective called “Circolo Vizioso” (meaning “Vicious Cycle” in English). After a self-titled mixtape, he released his first official release Terapia produced by Ford 78 and Sine.

In 2007, he met Lucci and Bruno Cannavicci (better known as Snais), who were members of the band Unabombers, and with addition of Franz and Nicco from Circolo Vizioso days, the five formed the collective Brokenspeakers. The formation had great success all over Italy, most notably opening for Busta Rhymes.

In parallel with working with the Brokenspeakers, Coez took a solo career and in 2009 released his solo album Figlio di nessuno that also included collaborations with Lucci, Hube, Nicco & Franz, Julia and Supremo73. In November 2011, he released the mixtape Fenomeno mixed with DJ Sine. Coez's first big commercially successful solo single was "Nella casa" followed by the album Non erano fiori on the Carosello Records and in collaboration with Riccardo Sinigallia. The album reached the Top 10 of the official Italian Albums Chart. He was also featured as a newcomer artist in the Music Summer Festival. In 2014, he collaborated with Gemitaiz & MadMan and in September 2015, he released Niente che non va with the single "La rabbia dei secondi" from the album. On 5 May 2017 he released his fourth solo album, Faccio un casino reaching #2 on the Italian Albums Chart. It was certified gold. The title track made it to the Top 10 on the Italian Singles Chart with a second track "La musica non c'è" topping the Italian Singles Chart making it his first #1 hit in Italy. Faccio un casino was nominated for IMPALA's European Album of the Year Award.

== Discography ==
=== Studio albums ===
List of studio albums, with chart positions and certifications
Year	Album title	Peak chart positions		Certifications
Year	Album title	ITA	SWI	Certifications
2009	Figlio di nessuno	—	—	
2013	Non erano fiori	9	—	FIMI: Gold
2015	Niente che non va	2	—	FIMI: Gold
2017	Faccio un casino	2	—	FIMI: 6× Platinum
2019	È sempre bello	1	—	FIMI: 3× Platinum
2021	Volare	3	—	FIMI: Platinum
2023	Lovebars (with Frah Quintale)	1	37	FIMI: Platinum
2025	1998	3	—	

=== Mixtape ===
- 2011: Fenomeno Mixtape

=== EPs ===
- 2012: Senza mani
- 2016: From the Rooftop

=== Singles ===
List of singles as lead artist, with selected chart positions, showing year released and album name
Title	Year	Peak positions	Certifications	Album
Title	Year	ITA	Certifications	Album
"Faccio un casino"	2017	9	FIMI: 4× Platinum	Faccio un casino
"La musica non c'è"	2017	1	FIMI: 8× Platinum	Faccio un casino
"Le luci della città"	2017	16	FIMI: 4× Platinum	Faccio un casino
"E yo mamma"	2017	40	FIMI: 2× Platinum	Faccio un casino
"È sempre bello"	2019	1	FIMI: 5× Platinum	È sempre bello
"Domenica"	2019	7	FIMI: 2× Platinum	È sempre bello
"La tua canzone"	2019	16	FIMI: 3× Platinum	È sempre bello
"Come nelle canzoni"	2021	4	FIMI: 3× Platinum	Volare
"Occhi rossi"	2022	21	FIMI: 2× Platinum	Volare
"Essere liberi"	2022	90	FIMI: Gold	Volare
"Margherita"	2022	56	FIMI: Gold	Volare
"Alta marea" (with Frah Quintale)	2023	8	FIMI: 2× Platinum	Lovebars
"Che colpa ne ho" (with Frah Quintale)	2023	52	FIMI: Gold	Lovebars
"Terra bruciata" (with Frah Quintale)	2024	58		Lovebars
"Ruggine" (with Mace and Chiello)	2024	40		Non-album single
"Lovebars" (with Frah Quintale)	2024	27	FIMI: Platinum	Lovebars
"Mal di te"	2025	34		1998
"Ti manca l'aria"	2025	89		1998
"Qualcosa di grande"	2025	38	FIMI: Gold	1998
"Mr. Nobody"	2025	—		1998
"Quelli come me" (with Juli)	2026	41		Non-album single

Others

- 2011: "E invece no"
- 2012: "Ali sporche"
- 2012: "Forever Alone"
- 2013: "Hangover"
- 2013: "Siamo morti insieme"
- 2014: "Instagrammo" (with Gemitaiz and MadMan)
- 2015: "La rabbia dei secondi"
- 2016: "Jet"
- 2016: "Niente di che"
- 2016: "Lontana da me"
