= Classico (album) =

Studio album by Bassi Maestro
- Released: 2000
- Genre: Underground hip-hop
- Language: Italian
- Label: Area Cronica
- Producer: Bassi Maestro

Bassi Maestro chronology
Foto di gruppo (1998)	Classico (2000)	Rapper italiano (2001)

Classico is the third studio album by the Italian rapper Bassi Maestro, released in 2000 under Area Cronica.

== Track listing ==
No.	Title	Producer(s)	Length
1.	"Potete entrare"	Bassi Maestro
2.	"Dramma"	Bassi Maestro
3.	"Classico"	Bassi Maestro
4.	"La bomba"	Bassi Maestro
5.	"Slang"	Bassi Maestro
6.	"Nel mix" (featuring DJ Zeta & Cricca Dei Balordi)	Bassi Maestro, Cricca dei Balordi
7.	"È così che va"	Bassi Maestro
8.	"Il mondo dei pazzi"	Bassi Maestro
9.	"L'incidente"	Bassi Maestro
10.	"L'hip hop è la mia vita"	Bassi Maestro
11.	"Constatazione servile"	Bassi Maestro
12.	"Parla tu!"	Bassi Maestro
13.	"In confronto"	Bassi Maestro
14.	"Wack Rappaz (pupazzi...)"	Bassi Maestro
15.	"La confessione"	Bassi Maestro
16.	"Faglielo sapere, Busdeez!!"	Bassi Maestro
17.	"Lo sanno" (featuring Tormento, Medda)	Bassi Maestro, Tormento, Medda
18.	"Yo, hey" (featuring Macro Marco)	Bassi Maestro, Macro Marco
19.	"Dicembre 1999"	Bassi Maestro
20.	"Dovete andarvene"	Bassi Maestro

== Link ==
Classico (album) at Discogs
