= Piotta (singer) =

Italian rapper (born 1973)

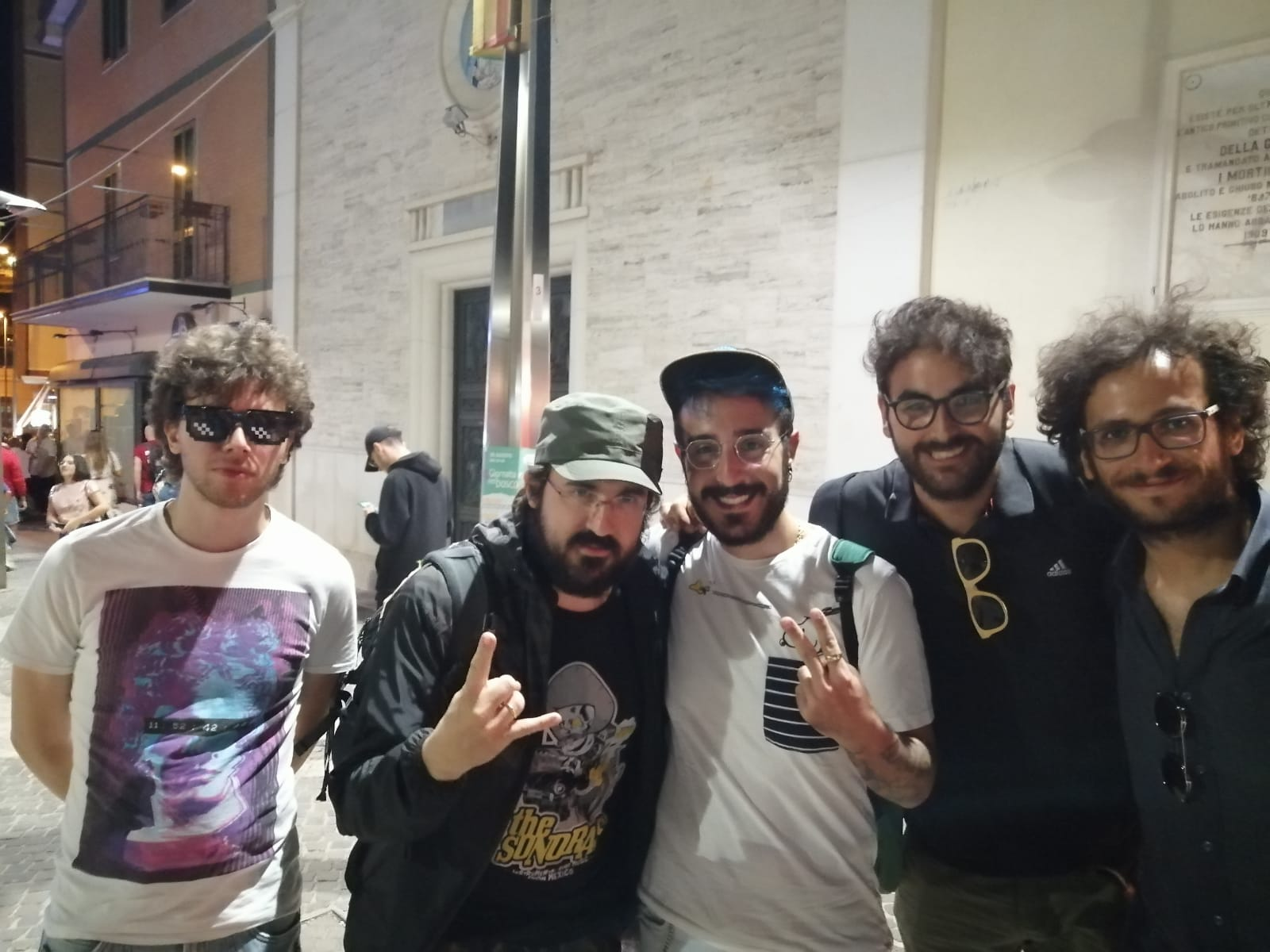

Background information
- Born: Tommaso Zanello; April 26, 1973 (age 53); Rome, Italy
- Genres: Hip-hop; rap; pop rap
- Occupation: Rapper
- Years active: 1994–present
- Website: www.piotta.net

Tommaso Zanello (born 26 April 1973), known by his stage name Piotta, is an Italian rapper. Piotta, which in Roman dialect means "100 liras", became famous with his song "Supercafone" which describes the coatto (Roman suburban impolite, politically incorrect chav).

Piotta's single "La Mossa del giaguaro" hit #15 on the Italian charts in 2000.

Now considered a "veteran" of Italian hip hop, Piotta set up a record label, La grande onda, with a focus on emerging Italian musicians. In 2015, he worked with Afrika Bambaataa for his album "Nemici".

== Discography ==
- Comunque vada sarà un successo, 1998
- Comunque vada sarà un successo '99, 1999
- Democrazia del microfono, 2000
- La Grande Onda, 2002
- Tommaso, 2004
- Multi Culti, 2007
- S(u)ono Diverso, 2009
- Odio gli indifferenti, 2012
- ...senza Er, 2013
- Interno 7 (Lato A) EP, 2018
