= Madman (rapper) =

Italian rapper (born 1988)

- Born: Pierfrancesco Botrugno; 25 July 1988 (age 37); Grottaglie, Apulia, Italy
- Genres: Hip hop
- Occupation: Rapper
- Years active: 2006–present
- Labels: Tanta Roba; Universal

Pierfrancesco Botrugno (born 25 July 1988), known professionally as Madman, sometimes stylized as MadMan, is an Italian rapper.

== Biography ==
=== Early years, Escape from Heart ===
Madman entered the world of hip hop by participating in the 2006 edition of Tecniche Perfette (a well-known italian freestyle competition), in Apulia, later won in Turin by July B.

In 2007 he made his debut with the self-produced mixtape Riscatto mixtape, made in collaboration with TempoXso, followed in the same year by Prequel (recorded together with Esse-P), and in 2008 by R.I.P. Street album. In 2010 Madman released the debut album Escape from Heart, released for free through the Honiro Label.

=== Collaborations with Gemitaiz, MM Vol. 1 ===
Since 2011 Madman has embarked on a musical collaboration with rapper Gemitaiz, with whom he has released the mixtape Haterproof (2011) and the EP Detto, Fatto. (2012), both released through the Honiro Label.

On June 28, 2013 Madman made the mixtape MM Vol. 1 Mixtape, consisting of 18 tracks. It was subsequently extracted from it as the only single "Come ti fa Mad", released by the label Tanta Roba of Gué Pequeno and DJ Harsh, with whom Madman signed a recording contract on September 25.

In 2014 the rapper returned to collaborate with Gemitaiz for the realization of the album Kepler, released on May 24. Anticipated by the videoclips of "Non se ne parla" and "Haterproof 2", the album met with great success in Italy, making its debut at the top of the Italian album chart and being certified gold by the Italian Music Industry Federation for over 25,000 copies sold in the country.

=== Doppelganger and MM Vol. 2 ===
In July 30, 2015, through his Facebook page, the rapper announced the completion of the second studio album Doppelganger, released on September 11 for Tanta Roba with Universal Music Group distributio.

On 27 October 2016 the mixtape MM Vol.2 Mixtape was released for free download, consisting of 16 tracks and anticipated by the videoclip of Bolla papale freestyle.

=== Back Home and MM Vol. 3 ===
On February 2, 2018 Madman releases his third studio album Back Home, anticipated by the singles "Trapano" and "Centro" (with the collaboration of the singer Coez). He also collaborates with rapper Nitro on the track called "O.K. Corral", from the album No Comment, and with rapper Enigma in the track "Che roba è?!", contained in the album Shardana.

A year later the mixtape MM Vol.3 Mixtape was released for digital download, promoted by the singles "7/8 Sour" and "Supernova".

=== Scatola nera ===
In 2019 Madman returned to collaborate with Gemitaiz for the creation of a new part of the Veleno series, materializing on June 7 with the release of "Veleno 7". The single achieved great success, debuting at the top of the Top Singles Billboard and beating the record of daily audience on Spotify Italy.

The song also played the role of the lead single on an album by the duo, entitled Scatola nera and released on September 20 of the same year.

== Discography ==
=== Albums ===
Solo

Title	Year	Peak positions
Title	Year	ITA
Escape from Heart	2010	–
Doppelganger	2015	1
Back Home	2018	1
Lonewolf	2024	4

with Gemitaiz

Title	Year	Peak positions	
Title	Year	ITA	SWI
Kepler	2014	1	–
Scatola nera	2019	1	99

=== Mixtapes and EPs ===
Solo

Title	Year	Peak positions
Title	Year	ITA
MM Vol. 1 Mixtape	2011	–
MM Vol. 2 Mixtape	2015	42
MM3	2019	2
MM Vol. 4	2021	2
MM Vol. 5	2026	2

with Gemitaiz

Title	Year	Peak positions
Title	Year	ITA
Haterproof (mixtape)	2011	–
Detto, fatto. (EP)	2012	24

Others

- 2007: Riscatto mixtape (with TempoXso)
- 2007: Prequel (with Esse-P)
- 2008: R.I.P.

=== Singles ===
Title	Year	Peak positions	Album / Mixtape
Title	Year	ITA	Album / Mixtape
"Non se ne parla" (with Gemitaiz)	2014	12	Kepler
"Haterproof 2" (with Gemitaiz)	2014	15	Kepler
"Trapano"	2017	3	Back Home
"Veleno 7" (with Gemetaiz)	2019	1	Scatola nera

=== Songs featured in ===
Title	Year	Peak positions
Title	Year	ITA
"Ok Corral" (Nitro feat. Madman)	2018	30
"Brillo" (Vegas Jones feat. Madman & Gemitaiz)	2018	15
"Holy Grail" (Gemitaiz feat. Madman)	2018	22
"Greve" (Bloody Vinyl / Slait, Tha Supreme, Young Miles feat. MadMan)	2020	20
"Rap City" (Tedua, Gemitaiz, MadMan & Chris Nolan)	2020	25
"Fair" (Gemitaiz feat. MadMan)	2020	30
"Foto" (Izi, Gemitaiz & MadMan)	2020	48

=== Other charting songs ===
Title	Year	Peak positions	Album / Mixtape
Title	Year	ITA	Album / Mixtape
"Successo"	2018	48	Back Home
"Extraterrestri" (feat. Priestess)	2018	50	Back Home
"R8"	2019	13	MM3
"Numeri"	2019	20	MM3
"Ludovico"	2019	32	MM3
"Beatrix Kiddo" (feat. Vale Lambo)	2019	39	MM3
"Queen Rmx" (feat. Geolier)	2019	46	MM3
"Fuori e dentro" (with Gemitaiz & tha Supreme)	2019	2	Scatola nera
"Esagono" (with Gemitaiz & Salmo)	2019	6	Scatola nera
"Scatola nera" (with Gemitaiz & Giorgia)	2019	13	Scatola nera
"¥€$" (with Gemitaiz)	2019	14	Scatola nera
"Che ore sono" (with Gemitaiz & Venerus)	2019	18	Scatola nera
"Californication" (with Gemitaiz)	2019	20	Scatola nera
"Jacuzzi"	2021	37	MM Vol. 4
"Chillin'"	2021	5	MM Vol. 4
"La cosa"	2021	43	MM Vol. 4
"Vero o falso" (with Speranza and Rafilù)	2021	49	MM Vol. 4
"Solo per me" (with Massimo Pericolo)	2021	24	MM Vol. 4
"Hot Pot"	2021	51	MM Vol. 4
"Garda"	2021	56	MM Vol. 4
"Veleno 8" (with Gemitaiz)	2021	10	MM Vol. 4
"Like This Like That" (with Yung Snapp and MV Killa)	2021	38	MM Vol. 4
"Defcon1"	2021	42	MM Vol. 4
"Audi" (with Ivan)	2021	75	MM Vol. 4
"Gaudi"	2021	68	MM Vol. 4
"Alfredo's" (with Mattaman, Lil' Pin, Nacho and Rik Rox)	2021	96	MM Vol. 4
"NSFCM"	2021	88	MM Vol. 4
"Niente di nuovo"	2021	84	MM Vol. 4
