= Gemitaiz =

Italian rapper (born 1988)

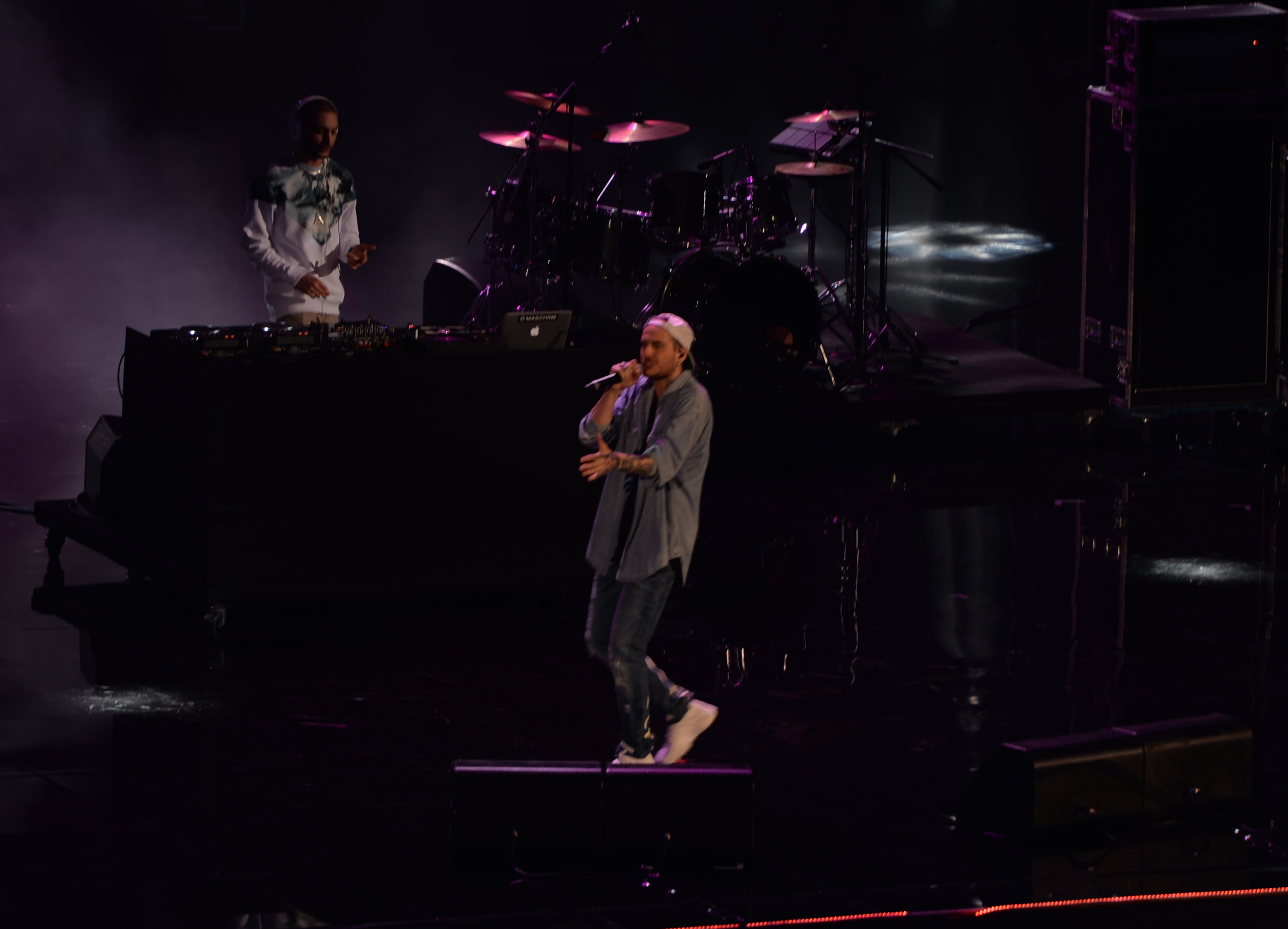
- Gemitaiz performing during Wind Music Awards in 2016

Background information
- Born: Davide De Luca; 4 November 1988 (age 38); Rome, Italy
- Genre: Hip hop
- Occupation: Rapper
- Years active: 2003-present
- Labels: Tanta Roba; Universal Music; Honiro Label

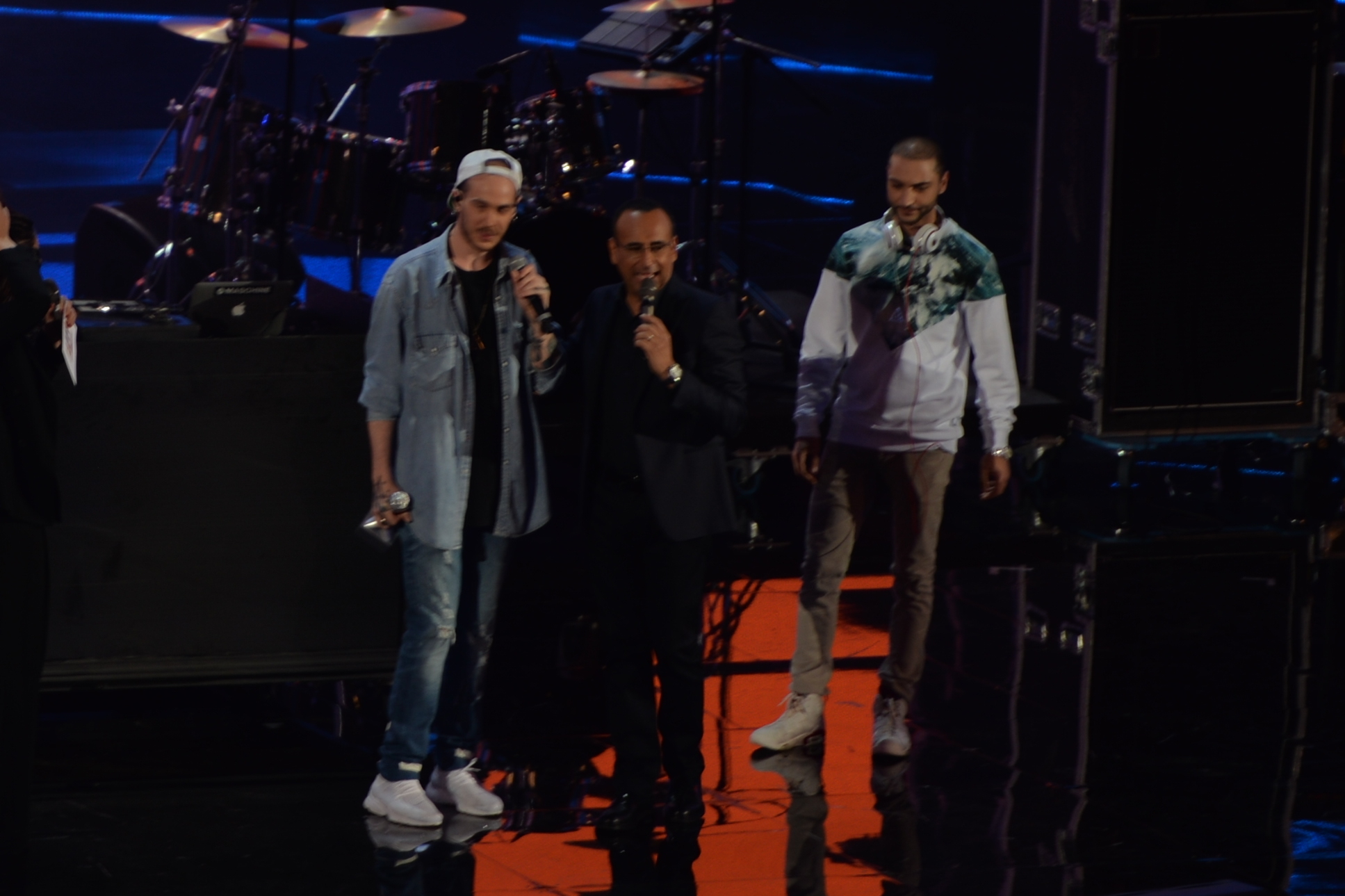
Gemitaiz performing during Wind Music Awards in 2016

Davide De Luca (born 4 November 1988), known professionally as Gemitaiz, is an Italian rapper. Besides his solo work, he has collaborated with many artists, most notably the Italian rapper MadMan. He was born in Rome. From 2007 to 2011 he was a member of the "Xtreme Team", a collective of rappers from Rome with Canesecco. His debut solo album came out in May 2013, with the title "L'unico compromesso" ("The Only Compromise"). It ended up peaking at the #3 spot on the Italian charts.

== Career ==
=== 2003–2013: Early years and L'unico compromesso ===
Gemitaiz entered the music industry in 2003. Due to his collaboration with rapper Canesecco, between 2006 and 2009 he released three mixtapes—Affare romano (2006), Affare romano vol. 2 (2007), and Affare romano zero (2009)—which featured collaborations with a large part of Rome's underground rap scene. In 2008, a theft incident occurred at Etto's recording studio, where the tracks ready for their solo CDs were stolen. The remaining tracks were released in an unmixed compilation titled No(mix)tape.

In 2009, he signed with Honiro Label, through which he released the solo mixtapes Quello che vi consiglio (2009), Quello che vi consiglio vol. 2 (2010), Quello che vi consiglio III (2012), and in collaboration with Canesecco, he released the mixtapes Xtreme Time (2010) and Xtreme Quality Mixtape (2011). Both of these latter mixtapes were released under the name Xtreme Team. In 2011, he began collaborating with rapper MadMan, with whom he released the mixtape Haterproof (2011) and the EP Detto, fatto. (2012). These were both released by Honiro Label as well.

In 2012, the rapper left Honiro Label to sign a record deal with Tanta Roba, a label founded by Gué Pequeno and DJ Harsh. On this label, Gemitaiz released his debut album, titled L'unico compromesso (2013). The album was a success, reaching number three on the Italian album chart. That same year, he released the mixtape "What I Recommend Vol. 4", preceded by the track "Intro".

=== 2014: Arrest and Kepler ===
On 29 January 2014, Gemitaiz was arrested in Rome on charges of drug possession and distribution. The rapper was stopped and searched on the street; he was then found in possession of ketamine and marijuana. During a subsequent search of his home, the Carabinieri discovered additional narcotics, hashish, and a precision scale. Gemitaiz was placed under house arrest and entered into a plea bargain the following month, accepting a sentence of one year and ten months in prison (suspended).

That same year, Gemitaiz teamed up with MadMan again to release the single "Non se ne parla", which was made available for digital download on April 2. The single preceded the release of the rappers' album, titled Kepler, which was released on May 24 by Tanta Roba. The album debuted at number one on the Italian album chart, and was certified gold by FIMI just two months after its release.

On 23 December 2014, Gemitaiz announced through his YouTube channel that the mixtape QVC Vol. 5 Mixtape would be released on the 30th of that same month. Preceded by the track "Rap Doom", whose music video was released on YouTube on December 29, the mixtape features collaborations with many Italian hip-hop artists, including MadMan and Clementino.

=== 2017–2018: Davide ===
On 6 October 2017, the rapper released the single Oro e argento, also revealing that he had completed a second single. The song debuted at number two on the Top Singles chart, marking this as Gemitaiz's highest-charting single debut. On December 15, his second single "Fuori" was released. It was produced by Mixer T.

On 20 April 2018, Gemitaiz released his third studio album Davide, the deluxe edition of which features a second CD titled QVC Collection: a release that had already been made available separately for digital download on March 30. The album features various collaborations with artists from the Italian hip hop scene and beyond, including Guè Pequeno (with whom he recorded a third single, "Tanta Roba Anthem"), MadMan, Fabri Fibra, and Coez—the latter being the artist behind the fourth single he released, "Davide".

On 28 December 2018, he released his eighth mixtape QVC8, announced by the singles "Senza di me" (featuring Venerus and Franco126) and "Rollin'".

=== 2019–2020: Scatola nera and QVC9 ===
In 2019, Gemitaiz returned to collaborate with MadMan for the creation of a new part of Veleno, which materialized on June 7 with the release of Veleno VII. The single achieved good success, debuting at the top of the Top Singles chart and breaking the record for daily listeners on Spotify Italy. The song also served as the lead single for the duo's album, titled Scatola nera and released on September 20.

In 2020, Gemitaiz began to take on the role of producer, creating the beats of Buonanotte for Dani Faiv and Specialist for Ensi. On November 6 of the same year, he released his ninth mixtape QVC9, in which he produced six songs total.

=== 2022–2023: Eclissi and QVC 10 ===
On 13 May 2022, he released his sixth studio album, Eclissi. He first released a single of the same name, preceding the release of the album. The track featured a collaboration with Neffa. The album, containing 13 tracks, contains collaborations with ASAP Ferg, MadMan, Sfera Ebbasta, Noyz Narcos, Coez, Marracash and Venerus. The album immediately became a success, obtaining a double certification platinum.

On 19 January 2023, he participated in the Italian remix of the song "Loose" by Outcast Music and Jay1, doing so in collaboration with Chadia Rodríguez. On 15 December 2023, Gemitaiz released QVC 10, the tenth chapter of the mixtape saga that he originally launched in 2009. It features numerous collaborations with other artists of the Italian hip hop scene, such as Fabri Fibra, Nayt, Jake La Furia, Guè, Emis Killa and MadMan. On 28 June 2024, he appeared together in the single Banda Kawasaki by Achille Lauro, along with Salmo.

=== 2025–present: Elsewhere ===
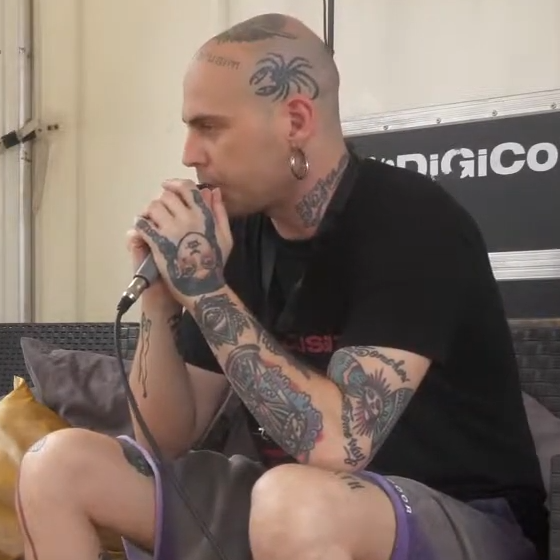
Gemitaiz in 2022

On 18 November 2025, after a long period of hints on his Instagram, Gemitaiz officially announced the release of his seventh studio album, Elsewhere. It was set for release on December 12. On November 27, the rapper revealed the album's official tracklist, featuring collaborations with Salmo, Neffa, Ele A, Coez, and others.

== Personal life ==
Gemitaiz is the son of a jazz musician. He took a liking to rap after listening to 2pac and Bassi Maestro. At the age of 16 he abandoned his studies as a surveyor to dedicate himself fully to music. He is a fan of football and a supporter of AS Roma. On social media, he is known for his critical streak towards the Giallorossi team, for which he has never hidden his love.

Gemitaiz has always been private about his personal life. All that is known about his romantic life is that he had a relationship for about two years with his colleague Ema Stokholma.

== Fashion and public image ==
Gemitaiz's public image has also developed heavily through fashion and styling projects. In 2018, he took part in the lookbook for Fausto Puglisi's men's fall/winter 2018-19 collection, doing so along with other Italian rappers including Luchè, Vegas Jones, and Capo Plaza.

In 2019, the styling of the music video for "Karate" (a song by Gemitaiz and MadMan, featuring Mahmood and directed by Fabrizio Conte) is attributed to Yosephine Melfi with special thanks to the Barbara Bologna brand.

In 2022, Gemitaiz also collaborated with AF Reflect Eyewear on a limited edition pair of sunglasses, handcrafted in Italy, with proceeds going to the Italian Multiple Sclerosis Association.

== Discography ==
=== Albums ===
Title	Year	Peak positions		Certification
Title	Year	ITA	SWI	Certification
Haterproof (with MadMan)	2011	—	—	
L'unico compromesso	2013	3	—	FIMI: Gold
Kepler (with MadMan)	2014	1	—	FIMI: Platinum
Nonostante tutto	2016	1	56	FIMI: 2× Platinum
Davide	2018	1	—	FIMI: Platinum
Scatola nera (with MadMan)	2019	1	99	FIMI: Platinum
Eclissi	2022	1	—	
Elsewhere	2025	2	—	

=== EPs ===
Title	Year	Peak positions
Title	Year	ITA
Detto, fatto. (with MadMan)	2013	24

=== Mixtapes ===
Title	Year	Peak positions
Title	Year	ITA
QVC Collection	2018	27
QVC8	2018	17
QVC9	2020	2
QVC 10 – Quello che vi consiglio Vol. 10	2023	1

=== Collaborative mixtapes (with Xtreme Team) ===
- 2006: Affare romano vol. 1 (with Xtreme Team)
- 2007: Affare romano vol. 2 (with Xtreme Team)
- 2008: No(mix)tape (with Xtreme Team)
- 2009: Affare romano zero (with Xtreme Team)
- 2010: Xtreme Time (with Xtreme Team)
- 2011: Xtreme Quality (with Xtreme Team)

=== Singles ===
Title	Year	Peak positions	Album
Title	Year	ITA	Album
"Fuori di qua (Out of My Way, Pt. 2)" (with MadMan)	2013	18	L'unico compromesso
"Oro & argento"	2017	2	Davide
"Fuori"	2017	5	Davide
"Davide" (feat. Coez)	2018	2	Davide
"Veleno 7" (with MadMan)	2019	1	Scatola nera

=== Featured in ===
Title	Year	Peak positions	Album
Title	Year	ITA	Album
"Albe nere" (Deleterio feat. MadMan & Gemitaiz)	2014	91	Dadaismo
"Ulalala" (Achille Lauro feat. Gemitaiz)	2016	70	Ragazzi madre
"Papparapà" (Nerone feat. Gemitaiz & Salmo)	2017	63	Max
"Veleno 6" (MadMan feat. Gemitaiz)	2017	67	MM Vol. 2
"04:20" (Ensi feat. Gemitaiz & MadMan)	2017	69	V
"Thoiry RMX" (Achille Lauro feat. Gemitaiz, Quentin40 & Puritano)	2018	36	
"Hollywood" (MadMan feat. Gemitaiz)	2018	30	Back Home
"Brillo" (Vegas Jones feat. Gemitaiz & MadMan)	2018	15	Bellaria
"Malibu" (Carl Brave feat. Gemitaiz)	2018	11	Notti brave
"Purple Rain" (Achille Lauro & Boss Doms feat. Gemitaiz & Frenetik&Orang3)	2018	43	Pour l'amour
"Giornate vuote" (Frenetik & Orang3 feat. Gemitaiz)	2019	13	
"Cuore rotto" (Rocco Hunt feat. Gemitaiz)	2019	97	
"Stanotte" (Gemello feat. Gemitaiz)	2019	69	
"Alleluia" (Clementino feat. Gemitaiz)	2019	73	Tarantelle
"Rap Shit" (Nitro feat. Tha Supreme, Gemitaiz)	2020	10	GarbAge
"Rap City" (Tedua, Gemitaiz, MadMan & Chris Nolan)	2020	25	Vita vera Mixtape [Aspettando la divina commedia]
"Foto" (Izi, Gemitaiz & MadMan)	2020	48	
"Dal tramonto all'alba" (Mace feat. Venerus, Gemitaiz)	2021	12	OBE
"Candyman" (Mace feat Gemitaiz)	2021	36	OBE

=== Other songs ===
Title	Year	Peak positions	Certifications	Album
Title	Year	ITA	Certifications	Album
"Haterproof 2" (with MadMan)	2014	15		Kepler
"Sempre in giro" (with MadMan)	2014	92		Kepler
"Bene"	2016	62		Nonostante tutto
"Inedito" (with Pedar Poy & MadMan)	2016	71		QVC6 (Mixtape)
"Forte"	2016	82		Nonostante tutto
"Non me ne vado" (feat. Emis Killa)	2016	90		Nonostante tutto
"Coma" (feat. Victor Kwality)	2016	75		Nonostante tutto (Reloaded)
"Tanta Roba Anthem" (feat. Guè Pequeno)	2018	17		Davide
"Paradise Lost"	2018	21		Davide
"Keanu Reeves" (feat. Achille Lauro)	2018	16		Davide
"Holy Grail" (feat. MadMan)	2018	22		Davide
"Pezzo trap" (feat. Fabri Fibra)	2018	23		Davide
"Lo sai che ci penso"	2018	37		Davide
"Chiamate perse"	2018	38		Davide
"Diverso"	2018	44		Davide
"Alaska" (feat. Priestess)	2018	50		Davide
"Un giro con noi"	2018	54		Davide
"Questa qua"	2018	76		Davide
"Buonanotte"	2018	83		Davide
"Rollin'" (with Mixer T)	2018	12		QVC8
"Senza di me" (feat. Venerus & Franco 126)	2018	12		QVC8
"Toradol"	2019	12		QVC8
"Giuro che" (feat. Priestess & Quentin40)	2019	16		QVC8
"Bad Boys" (feat. Ketama126)	2019	20		QVC8
"Che ci faccio" (with Mixer T)	2019	23		QVC8
"Mammastomale" (with Machete & Izi feat. Salmo)	2019	9		Machete Mixtape 4
"Fuori e dentro" (with MadMan & tha Supreme)	2019	2		Scatola nera
"Esagono" (with MadMan & Salmo)	2019	6		Scatola nera
"Karate" (with MadMan & Mahmood)	2019	8		Scatola nera
"Fiori" (with MadMan, Marracash & Guè Pequeno)	2019	9	FIMI: Gold	Scatola nera
"Come me" (with MadMan)	2019	12		Scatola nera
"Scatola nera" (with MadMan & Giorgia)	2019	13		Scatola nera
"¥€$" (with MadMan)	2019	14		Scatola nera
"Che ore sono" (with MadMan & Venerus)	2019	18		Scatola nera
"Californication" (with MadMan)	2019	20		Scatola nera
"Tutto OK" (with MadMan)	2019	32		Scatola nera
"Mondo di fango"	2020	10		QVC9
"Alright" (feat. Emis Killa & Geolier)	2020	13		QVC9
"In una Benz" (feat. Fabri Fibra)	2020	16		QVC9
"Marte" (feat. Izi)	2020	17		QVC9
"QVC9"	2020	19		QVC9
"Fair" (feat. MadMan)	2020	30		QVC9
"Rollercoaster" (feat. Carl Brave)	2020	31		QVC9
"Russian Roulette"	2020	34		QVC9
"Outro In the Night"	2020	39		QVC9
"Money Money" (feat. Ensi & Speranza)	2020	41		QVC9
"<3"	2020	43		QVC9
"Più di così (Gemitaiz )" (feat. D'African)	2020	47		QVC9
"Trap Emo Rmx" (feat. Achille Lauro)	2020	49		QVC9
"—" denotes an item that did not chart in that country.
