= Valeria Bruni Tedeschi =

Italian-French actress, screenwriter and film director

- Bruni Tedeschi in 2026
- Born: Valeria Carla Federica Bruni-Tedeschi; 16 November 1964 (age 61); Turin, Italy
- Occupations: Actress; filmmaker
- Years active: 1986–present
- Children: 1
- Relatives: Carla Bruni (sister)
- Awards: David di Donatello; Best Actress; 1996 The Second Time; 1998 Notes of Love; 2014 Human Capital; 2017 Like Crazy Nastro d'Argento; Best Actress; 2016 Like Crazy César Award; Most Promising Actress; 1994 Normal People Are Nothing Exceptional

Valeria Carla Federica Bruni Tedeschi (Italian: [vaˈlɛːrja ˈbruːni teˈdeski]; also written Bruni-Tedeschi; born 16 November 1964) is an Italian and French actress and filmmaker. Her 2013 film, A Castle in Italy, was nominated for the Palme d'Or at the 2013 Cannes Film Festival.

== Career ==
Bruni Tedeschi was born in Turin, Italy, in the Piedmont region of Italy, the daughter of Marisa Borini and Alberto Bruni Tedeschi. Like her younger sister, Carla Bruni, she has settled in France. The girls were raised bilingually, as their family moved to Paris in 1973, fearing kidnappings and, later, the terrorism of the Red Brigades.

Bruni Tedeschi trained in drama at Jean Darel and the American Center with Blanche Salant before joining Patrice Chéreau’s École des Amandiers in Nanterre in the early 1980s. She made her television debut in 1983 in Paolina, la juste cause et la bonne raison, and the same year appeared on stage in Platonov, directed by Chéreau. Her first significant film role came in Hôtel de France (1987), also directed by Chéreau.

Over the following decades, Tedeschi became known for a body of work spanning over 85 films, television productions, and stage performances. She won the César Award for Most Promising Actress in 1994 for her role in Les gens normaux n'ont rien d'exceptionnel (1993). She has frequently collaborated with filmmaker Noémie Lvovsky, appearing in more than ten of her works since 1990.

Her performances include roles in La Reine Margot (1994), Nénette et Boni (1996), Ceux qui m’aiment prendront le train (1998), and La parola amore esiste (1998). In Italian cinema, she has worked with directors such as Marco Bellocchio, Mimmo Calopresti, and Gabriele Muccino. Her later notable roles include 5×2 (2004), A Castle in Italy (Un château en Italie, 2013), which was nominated for the Palme d’Or at Cannes, and Les Estivants (2018). In 2014, she won the Best Actress award at the Tribeca Film Festival for her performance in Paolo Virzì’s Human Capital (Il capitale umano).

Tedeschi's debut film as a director, It's Easier for a Camel..., earned her two awards at the Tribeca Film Festival in 2003, for Emerging Narrative Filmmaker and Best Actress. The film was also awarded the Louis Delluc Prize for Best First Film in 2003, and won an award at the Ankara Flying Broom Women's Film Festival in 2004. It was entered into the 25th Moscow International Film Festival.

At the 2005 Berlinale, the Berlin International Film Festival, Bruni Tedeschi appeared to promote two films she had acted in: Tickets (2005), a three-segment film directed by Ermanno Olmi, Abbas Kiarostami, and Ken Loach, and Crustacés et Coquillages, a comedy directed by the French duo of Olivier Ducastel and Jacques Martineau.

In 2007, Bruni Tedeschi directed Actrices, which won the Prix Spécial du Jury at the 2007 Cannes Film Festival. Her 2022 film Les Amandiers (Forever Young) also premiered in the main competition of the 2022 Cannes Film Festival.

== Personal life ==
Tedeschi holds Italian nationality and acquired French nationality by naturalization on 31 July 2006. Her mother is Italian with French ancestry. Her father is Italian. She is a second cousin of Alessandra Martines. Tedeschi had a relationship with the French actor Louis Garrel from 2007 to 2012. Together they adopted a girl from Senegal in 2009. As of 2022, Bruni Tedeschi was in a relationship with French actor Sofiane Bennacer.

== Filmography ==
=== Film ===
Title	Year	Role(s)	Director	Notes
Paulette, la pauvre petite milliardaire	1986	Valeria	Claude Confortès	
Hôtel de France	1987	Sonia	Patrice Chéreau	
L'Amoureuse	1987	Vanessa	Jacques Doillon	
The Story of Boys & Girls	1989	Valeria	Pupi Avati	
Dis-moi oui, dis-moi non	1990	Cécile	Noémie Lvovsky	Short film
C'est la vie	1990	Odette	Diane Kurys	
Fortune Express	1991	Corinne	Olivier Schatzky	
L'Homme qui a perdu son ombre	1991	Anne	Alain Tanner	
Les gens normaux n'ont rien d'exceptionnel	1992	Martine	Laurence Ferreira Barbosa	
Condannato a nozze	1993	Gloria	Giuseppe Piccioni	
La Reine Margot	1994	2nd Escardon Volant	Patrice Chéreau	Cameo appearance
Le livre de cristal	1994	Julia Portal	Patricia Plattner	
Oublie-moi	1994	Nathalie	Noémie Lvovsky	
The Second Time	1995	Lisa Venturi	Mimmo Calopresti	
My Man	1996	Sanguine	Bertrand Blier	
The Liars	1996	Daisy	Élie Chouraqui	
Le Cœur fantôme	1996	Prostitute in Red	Philippe Garrel	
Encore	1996	Aliette	Pascal Bonitzer	
Nénette and Boni	1996	The Baker	Claire Denis	
Amour et confusions	1997	Michelle	Patrick Braoudé	
The House	1997	The Puppet Woman	Šarūnas Bartas	
On a très peu d'amis	1998	Michéle	Sylvain Monod	
Notes of Love	1998	Angela	Mimmo Calopresti	
Those Who Love Me Can Take the Train	1998	Claire	Patrice Chéreau	
The Color of Lies	1999	Frédérique Lesage	Claude Chabrol	
The Nanny	1999	Vittoria Mori	Marco Bellocchio	
La vie ne me fait pas peur	1999	Émilie's Mother	Noémie Lvovsky	
Empty Days	1999	Marie Del Sol	Marion Vernoux	
Voci	2001	Michela Canova	Franco Giraldi	
The Milk of Human Kindness	2001	Josiane	Dominique Cabrera	
Winter	2002	Marta	Nina Di Majo	
Once Upon an Angel	2002	Angèle's Solicitor	Vincent Perez	
Ten Minutes Older: The Cello	2002	Marcellina	Bernardo Bertolucci	Segment: "Histoire d'eaux"
If I Were a Rich Man	2002	Alice	Gérard Bitton, Michel Munz	
Happiness Costs Nothing	2003	Carla	Mimmo Calopresti	
It's Easier for a Camel...	2003	Federica	Valeria Bruni Tedeschi	Directional debut
Life as It Comes	2003	Paola	Stefano Incerti	
Feelings	2003	Young Mother	Noémie Lvovsky	Cameo appearance
5x2	2004	Marion	François Ozon	
Crustacés & Coquillages	2005	Béatrix	Olivier Ducastel, Jacques Martineau	
Tickets	2005	PR Lady	Ermanno Olmi, Abbas Kiarostami, Ken Loach	
Time to Leave	2005	Jany	François Ozon	
Quartier V.I.P.	2005	Claire	Laurent Firode	
Un couple parfait	2005	Marie	Nobuhiro Suwa	
Munich	2005	Sylvie	Steven Spielberg	
A Good Year	2006	Nathalie Auzet	Ridley Scott	
Let's Dance	2007	Sarah	Noémie Lvovsky	
Actrices	2007	Marcelline	Valeria Bruni Tedeschi	Also director and co-writer
L'abbuffata	2007	Amélie	Mimmo Calopresti	
The Great Alibi	2008	Esther Bachmann	Pascal Bonitzer	
Les Regrets	2009	Maya	Cédric Kahn	
Kiss Me Again	2010	Adele	Gabriele Muccino	
Les Mains en l'air	2010	Cendrine	Romain Goupil	
The Landlords	2012	Moira Mieli	Edoardo Gabbriellini	
Long Live Freedom	2013	Danielle	Roberto Andò	
A Castle in Italy	2013	Louise Rossi Levi	Valeria Bruni Tedeschi	Also director and co-writer
Human Capital	2013	Carla Bernaschi	Paolo Virzì	
40-Love	2014	Laura	Stéphane Demoustier	
Saint Laurent	2014	Madame Duzer	Bertrand Bonello	
La buca	2014	Carmen	Daniele Ciprì	
Latin Lover	2015	Stéphanie	Cristina Comencini	
Macadam Stories	2015	The Nurse	Samuel Benchetrit	
Like Crazy	2016	Beatrice Moraldini Valdirana	Paolo Virzì	
Slack Bay	2016	Isabelle Van Peteghem	Bruno Dumont	
Let the Sunshine In	2017	Woman in the Car	Claire Denis	Cameo appearance
The Summer House	2018	Anna	Valeria Bruni Tedeschi	Also director and co-writer
Aspromonte – La terra degli ultimi	2019	Giulia Tedeschi	Mimmo Calopresti	
Only the Animals	2019	Evelyne	Dominik Moll	
Summer of 85	2020	Mrs. Gorman	François Ozon	
The Time of Indifference	2020	Mariagrazia Ardengo	Leonardo Guerra Seragnoli	
Love Songs for Tough Guys	2021	Katia	Samuel Benchetrit	
The Divide	2021	Raphaëlle "Raf" Catania	Catherine Corsini	
Anaïs in Love	2021	Émilie	Charline Bourgeois-Tacquet	
Enquête sur un scandale d'État	2022	Prosecutor	Thierry De Peretti	
Le pupille	2022	Rosa	Alice Rohrwacher	Short film
The Line	2022	Christina	Ursula Meier	
Forever Young	2022	None	Valeria Bruni Tedeschi	Director and co-writer
I Told You So	2023	Gianna	Ginevra Elkann	
Il n'y a pas d'ombre dans le désert	2023	Anna	Yossi Aviram	Also co-writer
Somewhere in Love	2024	Nicole	Morgan Simon	
Eternal Visionary	2024	Antonietta Portulano	Michele Placido	
The Ties That Bind Us	2024	Sandra Ferney	Carine Tardieu	
Duse	2025	Eleonora Duse	Pietro Marcello	
Dog 51	2025	Irina Mitrovna	Cédric Jimenez	
Five Seconds	2025	Giuliana	Paolo Virzì	
The Spiral	2026	The Stranger	Paolo Strippoli	
Gli ultimi giorni di vita di Leonardo Revelli, figlio unico †	TBA	TBA	Stefano Grasso	Post-production

=== Television ===
Title	Year	Role(s)	Notes
Les Jupons de la Révolution	1989	Angelica Kaufman	Episode: "Marat"
Sandra, c'est la vie	1992	Véronique	Television movie
Haute tension	1992	Patricia	Episode: "Les mauvais instincts"
Une femme pour moi	1993	Victoria	Television movie
Roses à crédit	2010	Suzette	Television movie
In Treatment	2013	Irene	2 episodes
Paris, etc.	2017	Marianne	12 episodes
Call My Agent - Italia	2024	Herself	Season 2, episode 1
The Art of Joy	2025	Gaia Brandiforti	4 episodes

== Awards and nominations ==
Award	Year	Category	Nominated work	Result
2007 Cannes Film Festival	2007	Prix Spécial du Jury – Un Certain Regard Section	Actrices	Won
2013 Cannes Film Festival	2013	Palme d'Or	A Castle in Italy	Nominated
56th Venice International Film Festival	1999	Pasinetti Award for Best Actress	Empty Days	Won
61st Venice International Film Festival	2004	Pasinetti Award for Best Actress	5x2	Won
82nd Venice International Film Festival	2025	Pasinetti Award for Best Actress	Duse	Won
Bari International Film Festival	2017	Best Actress	Like Crazy	Won
César Awards	1994	Best Female Revelation	Les gens normaux n'ont rien d'exceptionnel	Won
César Awards	1997	Best Supporting Actress	My Man	Nominated
César Awards	2004	Best First Film	It's Easier for a Camel...	Nominated
César Awards	2017	Best Supporting Actress	Slack Bay	Nominated
César Awards	2021	Best Supporting Actress	Summer of 85	Nominated
César Awards	2022	Best Actress	The Divide	Nominated
César Awards	2023	Best Original Screenplay	Forever Young	Nominated
Ciak d'oro	2014	Best Actress	Human Capital	Won
David di Donatello	1996	Best Actress	The Second Time	Won
David di Donatello	1998	Best Actress	Notes of Love	Won
David di Donatello	2013	Best Actress	Long Live Freedom	Nominated
David di Donatello	2014	Best Actress	Human Capital	Won
David di Donatello	2017	Best Actress	Like Crazy	Won
David di Donatello	2020	Best Actress	The Summer House	Nominated
David di Donatello	2025	Best Supporting Actress	The Art of Joy	Won
David di Donatello	2026	Best Supporting Actress	Five Seconds	Nominated
David di Donatello	2026	Best Actress	Duse	Nominated
European Film Awards	2004	Best Actress	5x2	Nominated
European Film Awards	2014	Best Actress	Human Capital	Nominated
European Film Awards	2016	Best Actress	Like Crazy	Nominated
European Film Awards	2026	Best Actress	Duse	Nominated
Globo d'oro	2020	Best Actress	Aspromonte – La terra degli ultimi	Won
Globo d'oro	2021	Best Actress	The Time of Indifference	Nominated
La pellicola d'oro	2026	Best Actress	Duse	Nominated
Louis Delluc Prize	2003	Best Directional Debut	It's Easier for a Camel...	Won
Nastro d'Argento	1996	Best Actress	The Second Time	Nominated
Nastro d'Argento	1997	Best Actress	Les gens normaux n'ont rien d'exceptionnel	Nominated
Nastro d'Argento	1999	Best Actress	Notes of Love	Nominated
Nastro d'Argento	2005	Best New Director	It's Easier for a Camel...	Nominated
Nastro d'Argento	2010	Best Supporting Actress	Kiss Me Again	Nominated
Nastro d'Argento	2011	European Nastro d'Argento	Les Mains en l'air	Won
Nastro d'Argento	2014	Best Actress	Human Capital	Nominated
Nastro d'Argento	2015	Best Supporting Actress	Latin Lover	Nominated
Nastro d'Argento	2016	Best Actress	Like Crazy	Won
Nastro d'Argento	2016	Shiseido Award	Like Crazy	Won
Nastro d'Argento	2023	European Nastro d'Argento	Forever Young	Won
Nastro d'Argento	2026	Best Actress	Duse	Nominated
Nastro d'Argento – Grandi Serie	2025	Best Supporting Actress in a TV Series or Miniseries	The Art of Joy	Won
Rome Fiction Fest	2015	Excellence Award	Herself	Won
Tribeca Film Festival	2003	Best Actress	It's Easier for a Camel...	Won
Tribeca Film Festival	2003	Best Directional Debut	It's Easier for a Camel...	Won
Tribeca Film Festival	2014	Best Actress	Human Capital	Won
