= Got to Believe season 1 =

Got to Believe
- Season 1
- No. of episodes: 107

Release
- Original network: ABS-CBN
- Original release: August 26, 2013 – January 21, 2014

Season chronology
- Next → Season 2

The first season of Got to Believe premiered in the Philippines on August 26, 2013, with an audience share of 34% as reported in Kantar Media Nationwide TV Ratings. It officially ended on January 21, 2014, and contained 107 episodes which include a shortened telecast on September 27 due to technical difficulties.

The show is consistent on utilizing the micro-blogging site Twitter as one of its contributing writer dutifully sends the official hashtag for each day which is also the episode title appearing at the intertitle before a commercial break. Some notable hashtags were #G2BDanceWithMe for the November 26 telecast and #G2BUntilThen, the season ender episode which left the audience with a heartbreaking climax.

== Series overview and Ratings ==
Month	Episodes	Peak	Average Rating	Rank	
August 2013	5	34.3% (Episode 2)	32.4%	#3	
September 2013	21	32.5% (Episode 6)	29.6%	#5	
October 2013	23	33.4% (Episode 29)	29.2%	#6	
November 2013	21	28.4% (Episode 52)	25.2%	#5	
December 2013	22	28.5% (Episode 74)	27.7%	TBA	TBA
January 2014	23	33.4% (Episode 114)	33.1%	TBA	TBA

== Episodes ==
=== August 2013 ===
Episode No.	Title	Rating	Original Air Date	Timeslot Rank	Whole Day Rank	Source
1	Pilot	34.0%	August 26, 2013	#1	#2	
After passing the civil engineering board exam with flying colors, Jaime (Ian Veneracion) comes home to his hometown in Tabunok where his girlfriend Betchay (Manilyn Reynes) waits for him. Carrying his promise to Betchay that he will return one day to marry her, Jaime starts working in a construction firm in Manila owned by the San Juans. There, Jaime meets Juliana (Carmina Villarroel), the company president's daughter who eventually becomes his friend. Though difficult, Jaime and Betchay handle the distance until Jaime unintentionally commits an act of betrayal that is bound to change their lives.
2	Let the Magic Begin	34.3%	August 27, 2013	#1	#2	
Despite Jaime's refusal to marry Juliana, Betchay decides to leave the love of her life for him to take responsibility for Juliana and her unborn child. As the only way to earn Betchay's forgiveness, Jaime is left with no choice but to marry the woman he does not love. Meanwhile, Betchay's wandering feet brings her to a circus where she meets Chito (Benjie Paras).
3	Let the Magic Continue	31.6%	August 28, 2013	#1	#2	
While Betchay and Chito plan on raising Chichay (Kathryn Bernardo) in the province, Jaime and Juliana's rocky relationship begin to take its toll on Joaquin (Daniel Padilla). Soon, Joaquin crosses paths with Chichay as Poro (Al Tantay) agrees to take the boy to the carnival.
4	The Magic Continues	30.2%	August 29, 2013	#1	#2	
Hoping to forget about his parents' endless fights, Joaquin goes to Piedras Platas and looks for Chichay who, in turn, attempts to cheer him up by proving that magic exists. Unknown to Joaquin, however, his wish to spend a night with his parents in the carnival leads to Jaime and Betchay's reunion that later fired up Jaime's decision to leave Juliana.
5	The Magic Continues 2	31.9%	August 30, 2013	#1	#2	
On New Year's Eve, while everyone else excitedly waits for the clock to strike midnight, a brief struggle ensues between Chito and Asiong (Ping Medina) as the latter attempts to steal the carnival's earnings. After getting hold of Asiong's gun, Chito fires a warning shot. At the same moment Joaquin gets hit in the head by a stray bullet. With the bullet still in his head, Joaquin starts a new life bounded by the excessive protection of Juliana. Chichay, on the other hand, moves to the province with her parents to fulfill their wish for her to finish schooling.
3rd most watched program in August 2013 with 32.4% average rating.

=== September 2013 ===
Episode No.	Title	Rating	Original Air Date	Timeslot Rank	Whole Day Rank	Source
6	Magical	32.5%	September 2, 2013	#1	#2	
After ten years in the province, Chichay reunites with her family in Piedras Platas, only to find her beloved carnival dying in debt. Joaquin resigns to his mother's strict control of his life until his father decides to bring him to their company's summit. On their way to the event, Poro allows Joaquin to a secret stopover at a carnival they passed by. Joaquin reminisces his childhood friend-unaware of their imminent second meeting-while Chichay runs in the same area in pursuit of an idea to save Piedras Platas.
7	Two Different Worlds	30.2%	September 3, 2013	#1	#2	
Chichay and Joaquin carry on with their lives unaware of their fateful meeting at the carnival. Chichay uses her prize money to get back the dismantled carousel and succeeds in bringing Piedras Platas back to its former glory. On the other hand, Joaquin faces people other than his family for the first time, only to affirm his belief that he is different from everyone else.
8	Magic In The Making	28.1%	September 4, 2013	#1	#2	
When Juliana learns about the accident that nearly puts Joaquin's life in danger, she immediately fires Joaquin's personal driver Poro and his nanny Puring (Irma Adlawan). Despite Joaquin's pleas to hire them back, Juliana refuses and gets a new nanny for him. Meanwhile, the carousel at Piedras Platas malfunctions and endangers the lives of the passengers, leading the carnival's operations to cease.
9	Enchanting	31.1%	September 5, 2013	#1	#2	
Joaquin assures Puring and Poro that they will get their jobs back as he continues to scare his prospective nannies away. Meanwhile, the job agency owner offers Chichay a nanny post as it earns more than selling pancit on the street. Chichay tries her luck and goes to Joaquin's home with her application and out of desperation, Juliana hires her on the spot.
10	Enchanting 2	29.1%	September 6, 2013	#1	#2	
Chichay happily announces her employment to her family, but struggles to convince Chito to allow her to do it. Fully convinced that she will take care of a little boy, Chichay starts her first day at work with confidence; unaware that she is to be trapped by Joaquin, who is determined to bring back his beloved servants at all costs. Meanwhile, Matilda (Minnie Aguilar) plans to make life more miserable for Chito and his family.
11	Enchanting 3	31.5%	September 9, 2013	#1	#3	
Following her father's advice, Chichay quits the nanny position only to learn that he was arrested for the carousel accident. Making her parents believe that she is unaware of their situation, Chichay returns to the mansion and accepts the job again, much to Juliana's relief. With a month's worth of salary already used for her father's bail, Chichay is determined to fulfill her tasks with positivity. However, Joaquin soon realizes that she is the same girl at the carnival and the cause of all his miseries, prompting him to think of creative ways to get rid of her.
12	Mysterious	28.9%	September 10, 2013	#1	#3	
Chichay survives her first day as Joaquin's nanny albeit nursing back pains from his prank, much to Joaquin's annoyance. While Chichay faces another day with the thought of her parents as motivation, Betchay finally learns about her daughter's sacrifice. Meanwhile, Jaime is put on a very tight spot when the project proposal he worked hard for dissatisfies his client.
13	Joyful	29.1%	September 11, 2013	#1	#3	
Chichay's strange discoveries about Joaquin lead her to believe that Joaquin is gay. Still bent on making Chichay quit, Joaquin tries his poltergeist prank on her. Back at Piedras Platas, Chito and Betchay discover that Isko (Joonee Gamboa) has gone missing. At East Horizon, Juliana saves Jaime from being put on the spot by their clients. Rather than feeling grateful, however, Jaime is left feeling more ashamed.
14	Moving	31.7%	September 12, 2013	#1	#2	
Chichay stands up for her parents when Joaquin makes an offensive comment about them regarding her employment. At the office, Rolando (Chinggoy Alonzo) surprises his officers, especially Jaime, with his decision of including Juliana in all of East Horizon's projects from now on. While Jaime sees Rolando's decision as proof of the latter's distrust on him, Juliana rejoices when Rolando confides to her his reason for making her rejoin East Horizon. Still searching for the missing Isko, Betchay and Chito rush to a morgue upon learning that an old man, who was a hit-and-run victim, was brought there.
15	Lost and Found	31.6%	September 13, 2013	#1	#2	
Chichay becomes more determined to look for her phone in Joaquin's room when she gives in to Juliana's request to cancel her day off. However, Joaquin catches Chichay sneaking into his room and demands his parents to fire her. Meanwhile, Chito and Betchay's positivism attracts magic to their doorsteps.
16	Roller Coaster	27.2%	September 16, 2013	#1	#3	
Chichay apologizes to Joaquin for accusing him of keeping her phone, but only receives cold treatment from him. Joaquin's mood worsens when Jaime stands by Juliana's decision not to rehire Poro and Puring at the mansion. Meanwhile, Chito and Betchay take the whole family to visit Chichay, surprising her greatly. However, their merriment is cut short when Chichay is called to her duties. Chichay goes to Joaquin's room in high spirits, unaware of the task he has for her.
17	Affecting	29.0%	September 17, 2013	#1	#3	
Upon realizing that she is at fault in Poro and Puring's termination, a guilty Chichay tries to make it up to Joaquin, but continues to receive cold treatment from him. At East Horizon, Juliana and Jaime learn about Ronaldo's plan of announcing his replacement as head of the San Juan Group of Companies at the awards night. Meanwhile, Chito and Betchay come home only to find their beloved Piedras Platas engulfed in flames.
18	Start of Something New	29.5%	September 18, 2013	#1	#3	
Joaquin relishes a surprise breakfast date with Poro and Puring, only to learn that their short visit will be their final goodbye. Upon visiting home, Chichay tearfully sees the remains of Piedras Platas and hears the sad news of Chito's decision for their bankrupt carnival.
19	Life Goes On	30.0%	September 19, 2013	#1	#3	
Chichay enters a new phase in her life as her Piedras Platas family let go of the carnival and move into their new home. Unaware of what is to come, the Manansala family heads to the company's event with full confidence that Jaime will be announced as the next president.
20	Closer You and I	28.6%	September 20, 2013	#1	#3	
While Joaquin suffers another night hearing his parents argue, Chichay enjoys warm rice porridge with her parents. She returns to the mansion the next day and delights at the order that she must accompany Joaquin to the mall. Unaware that he has a different agenda for their trip, Chichay watches out for Joaquin, who grabs the opportunity to escape from her guard. Meanwhile, Juliana learns that Jaime is nowhere to be found.
21	Expect The Unexpected	27.6%	September 23, 2013	#1	#3	
Joaquin succeeds in taking Malaya University's entrance exam without his family and Chichay's knowledge. However, his parents' dispute after Juliana's ascend to the company's presidency puts a strain on Joaquin's hopes to enter the school. On the other hand, Juliana finally understands Ronaldo's reasons for giving her the position, but it aggravates her fear of losing Jaime completely.
22	What Do We Mean To Each Other	27.9%	September 24, 2013	#1	#3	
Much to Juliana's surprise, Jaime returns after an unreachable absence and declares his resignation from his position. Humbly conceding to her presidency, he explains his desire to fulfill his role as a father to Joaquin, but it does little to appease her doubts and fears. His wish gets put to the test when they arrive home and surprisingly learn about Joaquin's secret, unaccompanied ventures when Chichay innocently shows them his entrance exam results.
23	Taking Chances	28.2%	September 25, 2013	#1	#3	
With Ronaldo's help, Jaime eases Joaquin's way into Malaya University. Knowing that his application will enrage his mother, Joaquin instructs Chichay to leave Jaime the right to tell Juliana about it. To his disappointment, Joaquin soon learns that the news has already reached and upset Juliana, and accuses Chichay of telling them on to his mother. Meanwhile, Chito also gets upset after discovering that the young boy Chichay looks after turns out to be a grown-up teenager and that the money used for his bail came from Chichay's loan from her employers.
24	Moving On	29.8%	September 26, 2013	#1	#2	
Much to Joaquin's delight, Juliana finally allows him to attend Malaya University. Joaquin's happiness is cut short, however, when he learns that Chichay resigned after their last argument. Meanwhile, while Juliana realizes that she needs someone to look after Joaquin in school, Chito decides to send Chichay to college. The next day, after her futile search for a university that will accept her, Chichay receives a tempting offer from Juliana.
25	First Day High	29.8%	September 27, 2013	#1	#2	
NOTE: This episode failed to air in its entirety due to technical difficulties. The TV Network flashed an advisory during its telecast.
26	1st Day Reloaded	29.6%	September 30, 2013	#1	#3	
On their first day at the Malaya University, Chichay silently watches over Joaquin as she has promised Juliana, while Joaquin takes pains fending for himself in a new environment. Meanwhile, armed with her special noodle dish, Betchay goes to My Shooting Star Foundation to extend her gratitude for Chichay's scholarship. There, Betchay and Juliana meet once again.
5th most watched program in September 2013 with 29.6% average rating.

=== October 2013 ===
Episode No.	Title	Rating	Original Air Date	Timeslot Rank	Whole Day Rank	Source
27	Then You Look At Me	29.0%	October 1, 2013	#1	#3	
Armed with Puring's advice, Joaquin decides to make up for his unpleasant first day at the university and goes to school earlier than everyone else the following day-only to find out that his class has been suspended and everyone is out to attend the freshman orientation. Soon enough, Joaquin is caught off his guard after being dragged to the stage for being the entrance examination's top scorer. Meanwhile, upon seeing how Jaime enjoyed Bechay's noodle dish, Juliana decides to hire Bechay as the Manansala's new cook.
28	Return of the J	30.0%	October 2, 2013	#1	#2	
Despite his humiliating experience at school, Joaquin turns down Juliana's discouragement and remains determined to study at the university. Meanwhile, Jaime learns that Juliana hired Chichay to keep an eye on their son while at the campus. While Betchay succeeds to be the Manansala's new cook, Chito's disastrous first day on his new job brings back memories of a crime he committed in the past.
29	My Hero Comes Along	33.4%	October 3, 2013	#1	#2	
While Joaquin finally begins to adapt to the university life, Chichay struggles to put up with a group of troublemakers as they get back at her for intervening in one of their mischief-makings. Meanwhile, Betchay begins her first day as the Manansala's new cook. Chito, on the other hand, secretly sets out to learn about the victim of the stray bullet he was responsible for setting off many years ago.
30	Go The Distance	30.5%	October 4, 2013	#1	#2	
Chichay finds a new friend in Dominic (Jon Lucas), a fraternity and debate team member who saves her against a group of bullies. As her heroic deed becomes the talk of the town at Malaya University, Chichay gets an offer to be the freshman representative in the student elections. Through Dominic, Joaquin also receives the same invitation as Chichay's from Mrs. Velasco (Joy Viado). Meanwhile, Betchay gets into an accident that leads her to a reunion with a man from her past.
31	I Believe In You	34.3%	October 7, 2013	#1	#3	
Following Betchay and Jaime's unexpected reunion, Betchay feels the need for Juliana to know about her and Jaime's past relationship. Aside from Didith (Kristel Fulgar) who has earned the dean's approval to run independently in the coming student elections, Chichay and Joaquin learn that they will be each other's opponent for the freshman representative position, leaving both worried about each other. Meanwhile, Chito learns that the real name of the stray bullet victim is not Joaquin San Pedro, but Joaquin San Juan.
32	Vote For Me	30.5%	October 8, 2013	#1	#3	
Joaquin succeeds in earning his parents' approval to run in the student elections. Earning Juliana's consent as well, Chichay is spared from withdrawing her candidacy for Joaquin's sake. All completely prepared, Didith, Joaquin, and Chichay begin their campaign for the freshmen representative position. Meanwhile, Betchay reveals to Chito that her boss Jaime was her former boyfriend.
33	For The Win	30.4%	October 9, 2013	#1	#2	
Joaquin chances upon Nanoy (Darwin Tolentino), whom he recalls as the companion of the little girl he had met in a circus a long time ago. Meanwhile, Jaime's revelation about his past relationship with Betchay brings back Juliana's fear of losing her husband. At Malaya University, Didith, Joaquin, and Chichay face the entire school and engage in a competitive debate as the Meeting de Avance commences.
34	Count On Me	28.9%	October 10, 2013	#1	#3	
The student elections pave way for Chichay and Joaquin's reconciliation as the latter seeks Chichay's forgiveness for everything he has done to her. The turnout of student votes, however, reveals Didith as the new freshmen representative. Meanwhile, with Betchay's help, Jaime prepares a romantic dinner for Juliana where he takes the chance to ask her to marry him again.
35	Starting Over Again	26.9%	October 11, 2013	#1	#3	
With the help of their respective families, Chichay and Joaquin move on from their loss in the student elections. Joaquin, who worries more about Chichay's condition, sends an encouraging message to Chichay. Soon, Chichay asks Joaquin if he is her mysterious text pal. Meanwhile, Didith's unconvincing win as the freshmen representative pushes Ms. Velasco and Ms. Jean (Niña Dolino) to demand an election recount. While Chito gets jealous of Betchay and Jaime's rekindled closeness, Juliana faces a problem concerning her presidency in San Juan Group of Companies.
36	Can This Be Love?	30.3%	October 14, 2013	#1	#2	
Joaquin and Chichay tell Ms. V and Ms. Jean their decision not to contest Didith's victory. Joaquin's friendliness, magnified by his good deed of giving Chichay a ride home, makes Chichay the subject of teasing by her family. Meanwhile, Chichay tries her luck in finding a part-time job at school.
37	Catch Me, I'm Falling	28.8%	October 15, 2013	#1	#3	
Despite her conscious efforts to avoid Joaquin, Chichay is forced to seek Joaquin's help for the Scholars Guild organization. In a short reunion, Madam Fifi (Cecil Paz) advises Chito to be extra protective of his wife and daughter. Meanwhile, Tarantina (Beverly Salviejo) tells Juliana that she has been noticing the closeness between Jaime and Betchay.
38	It's Complicated	27.9%	October 16, 2013	#1	#3	
Despite Juliana's disapproval, Joaquin asks his driver to accompany him to Didith's party after learning that Chichay will be going to the event alone. Didith, on the other hand, cooks up a scheme against Chichay upon learning that Joaquin will not be present at her party. While contemplating Ms. Jean's critique on her artwork, Chichay recalls the boy she had met at the circus. Meanwhile, Jaime, Juliana, and Betchay proceed with their trip to Tabunok.
39	My First Romance	29.5%	October 17, 2013	#1	#3	
Unaware of Didith's scheme against her, Chichay attends the party in her manananggal costume. With Goma and Ethel's help, Joaquin manages to arrive at the party after avoiding Juliana's interrogation. Meanwhile, witnessing how close Betchay is to Jaime's family and neighbors in Tabunok, Juliana decides to prove herself and volunteers to challenge Betchay in the pig chasing contest. Later, Jaime's car breaks down, forcing Betchay, Juliana, and Jaime to spend the night in Tabunok.
40	You Were There	31.0%	October 18, 2013	#1	#2	
Didith turns Chichay into a joke at her party, but Joaquin turns up and saves Chichay from further humiliation. Later, a grateful Chichay exchanges text messages with Joaquin, and she gets surprised with the latter's last message to her. In Tabunok, Juliana offers friendship to Betchay as they talk about the latter's past relationship with Jaime. Later, a drunken Jaime utters Betchay's name in front of his wife.
41	Level Up	30.0%	October 21, 2013	#1	#3	
The following day after Didith's party, Joaquin finds himself admired by many students, while Chichay becomes the subject of envy of the girls in the campus. A small accident, however, brings back Joaquin's fear for his condition. Meanwhile, Jaime, Juliana, and Betchay's visit at Tabunok's Santa Santisima Church leaves Juliana hurting after overhearing her husband tell Betchay his regrets.
42	Gummy Bear	27.3%	October 22, 2013	#1	#3	
While Joaquin and Chichay's growing closeness gains the attention of their friends, Jaime and Betchay's renewed friendship deeply troubles Juliana. At East Horizon, Ronaldo reprimands Juliana for the company's poor performance during the first month of her presidency.
43	My MVP	27.1%	October 23, 2013	#1	#3	
Joaquin's interest in basketball is revived upon watching Malaya University's star player in a game. Meanwhile, Chichay's new part-time job as a waitress turns out to be for a book launch of Dominic's mother. While her jealousy over Jaime and Betchay begins to get the better of Juliana, Chito becomes more intent on searching for a job. Soon, Chito's prayer is answered as Nanoy announces the opening of a theme park's new horror house.
44	Realize	29.9%	October 24, 2013	#1	#2	
Dominic gives Chichay and her friends a ride home after his mother's book launch party. Upon reaching Chichay's house, Dominic takes the chance to tell the girl his intentions of courting her. With his renewed interest in basketball, Joaquin spends a morning alone at the campus' basketball court shooting hoops. The athletics director witnesses Joaquin's inherent shooting skills and convinces him to join the university's basketball team. Meanwhile, Juliana's fault-finding sparks an argument between her and Jaime.
45	That Should Be Me	29.8%	October 25, 2013	#1	#2	
For an unfamiliar reason, Joaquin finds himself annoyed with the thought that Dominic is courting Chichay. Baffled by his strange feelings, Joaquin asks Poro and Jaime what this could mean. Poro and Jaime's views give Joaquin the idea that he likes Chichay not just as a friend. Meanwhile, Juliana takes an opportunity to fire Betchay in hopes of cutting the latter's ties with Jaime.
46	I Think, I'm In Love	28.0%	October 28, 2013	#1	#2	
Following her termination, Betchay tearfully leaves the Manansala mansion and tells Jaime that she will accept Juliana's decision in hopes of avoiding further conflict and affecting Chichay's scholarship. Despite Jaime's disapproval of her decision, Juliana assures him that she will continue sponsoring Chichay's schooling in order to still keep an eye on their son. While the turn of events takes its toll on Chichay, Joaquin prepares to finally court her.
47	Hurting Inside	27.9%	October 29, 2013	#1	#3	
Joaquin unintentionally learns about Juliana and Chichay's secret agreement after overhearing their conversation at school. Despite Chichay's efforts to come clean, Joaquin decides to end their friendship and set aside his intention to confess his feelings for her. Besides feeling guilty for betraying Joaquin's trust, Chichay also worries that her scholarship might suffer because of Joaquin's discovery.
48	I'll Never Go	28.8%	October 30, 2013	#1	#3	
After hearing encouraging words from Jaime and Ms. V., Joaquin musters the courage to join Malaya's basketball team in spite of Juliana's disapproval. Meanwhile, Chichay finally sees an opportunity to patch things up between them when Joaquin agrees to meet her at the school grandstand.
49	I'm Missing You	26.6%	October 31, 2013	#1	#2	
Desperate to reconcile with Joaquin, Chichay decides to support the school's basketball team during an invitational game and dresses up as the school's mascot. While trying to hide his extra-curricular activity to his parents, Joaquin struggles to approach Chichay after their slight misunderstanding. Meanwhile, Jaime's decision to put up his company triggers another heated argument with Juliana.
6th most watched program in October 2013 with 32.1% average rating.

=== November 2013 ===
Episode No.	Title	Rating	Original Air Date	Timeslot Rank	Whole Day Rank	Source
50	More Than Friends	25.5%	November 1, 2013	#1	#2	
Joaquin and Chichay finally get the chance to discuss the issues messing their friendship. While Chichay is satisfied with Joaquin's forgiveness, Joaquin asks Chichay to take their friendship to the next level. At East Horizon, when Jaime refuses to give up on his dream of putting up his own company, Juliana resorts to intimidating Jaime's only trusted ally.
51	Diskarte (Tactic)	25.1%	November 4, 2013	#1	#4	
Joaquin begins his courtship by fetching Chichay at the Tampipis'. Remembering Ethel's advice to court Chichay's parents first, Joaquin politely introduces himself to Chito, who becomes haunted by his dark past upon hearing Joaquin's full name. Meanwhile, Juliana learns to accept that Jaime wants her out of his life, but vows not to let Jaime take Joaquin away from her.
52	Ikaw Na! (You already!)	28.4%	November 5, 2013	#1	#3	
Determined to win Chito's trust, Joaquin politely grants Chito's request to have a one-on-one talk. As the oblivious Joaquin shares to Chito how a stray bullet changed his life forever, Chito secretly confirms the truth he has been dreading the most. Meanwhile, Martin and Kit pay the Manansalas a visit, and Juliana takes advantage of Kit's chatty mood to learn more about the girl Joaquin is courting. While Joaquin chickens out and lies to Juliana about the girl he likes, Chichay musters the courage to tell Isko about her growing affection for Joaquin.
53	I've Fallen For You	26.8%	November 6, 2013	#1	#3	
After learning that Juliana took the initiative to set a formal dinner with Amanda and her family without Joaquin's knowledge, Betchay becomes increasingly worried for Chichay. Meanwhile, Chichay tells Joaquin that she wants to come clean with his mother, but loses the chance to admit her true feelings for him. Chichay's resolve is soon tested when Joaquin gets in an accident during a basketball match, and Chito accidentally reveals Joaquin's condition to her.
54	I Care	24.6%	November 7, 2013	#1	#3	
Chichay scolds Joaquin for keeping his condition from her, while he tries to explain his reasons for keeping it. While Joaquin resigns to the consequences of the accident reaching his parents, he breathes a sigh of relief when Jaime learns about it and decides to keep it a secret from Juliana. On the other hand, Juliana's paranoia worsens as she feels that Jaime is brainwashing Joaquin against her.
55	Risk It All	18.5%	November 8, 2013	#1	#4	
Despite Joaquin's assurances that he will be alright, Chichay becomes increasingly concerned for him especially when he is up to face an aggressive team in his next basketball match. To add to her worries, Chichay dreams that Joaquin will encounter a fatal accident. Later on, she witnesses the events leading to this tragic end during the real game.
56	You Are Not Alone	22.6%	November 11, 2013	#1	#4	
While seeing her nightmare slowly turn into reality, Chichay becomes even more distressed upon overhearing Joaquin's opponents planning to impair the latter. Despite the risk of losing her friendship with Joaquin and her scholarship at Malaya, Chichay finally tells Juliana about Joaquin's risky engagement in basketball. Meanwhile, Betchay begins her journey to becoming a chef as she receives full scholarship at the International Culinary Institute.
57	I Think of You	24.3%	November 12, 2013	#1	#4	
Chichay felt guilty about what she did, thinking that she did saved the life of her friend, but she also lost him in the process. Jaime at the same time, tries to plead with Juliana to let Joaquin stay at Malaya but his wife is insisting on keeping their son at home. Chichay finally decides to go to the Manansala residence to say her apology to Juliana and tells her that she will now return the scholarship that the San Juan foundation gave her since she is no longer needed.
58	If The Feeling is Gone	24.4%	November 13, 2013	#1	#4	
Juliana takes Joaquin to a new doctor who confirms that Joaquin is in good condition. Because of this, she decides to allow him to stay in Malaya as long as he will be accompanied by a bodyguard. At the same time, with the help of her friends, Chichay gets a chance to apply for a scholarship grant. Her parents also assure her that they will strive hard to keep her from dropping out of Malaya. Jaime then persuades Joaquin to tell her mother the truth about Chichay but he refuses, saying that it's useless because he doesn't love her anymore. The next day, they saw each other at the university but Joaquin ignored her. Chichay cried after that, causing Dominic to confront him. Joaquin then tells him that he had to lie about his feelings for her but that he really loved her.
59	Can't Fight This Feeling	26.5%	November 14, 2013	#1	#3	
Joaquin admits to Dominic that he is still in love with Chichay. Dominic then makes him realize that he is being blinded by his anger which is stopping him from understanding the fact that Chichay only did what she thought was right for his condition. Juliana is relieved because there's no more Tampipis in her life since she had already fired Betchay and Chichay had returned the scholarship that she gave her. She finalizes the reservation for their dinner with Amanda's family, whom Joaquin used to cover up his courtship with Chichay. Although Joaquin has already switched classes, he still decided to attend his previous P.E class. This saved Chichay from being alone during a dance rehearsal for he volunteered to be her dance partner again. While they were dancing, they kept on arguing with each other which ultimately led Chichay to walk out from the class. Joaquin ran after her, asking why she told his mother his secret. She then explained that she only did that because she was afraid to lose him, because she loved him. Then, she ran away. That night, Joaquin called her, asking about what she confessed to him earlier. He then instructed her to come to the restaurant where he and his parents were supposed to have dinner with Amanda's family, finally getting the courage on admitting his love to her in front of his parents.
60	Stand Up For Love	25.6%	November 15, 2013	#1	#4	
Joaquin stopped Amanda and her parents from attending the dinner, explaining that it was just a mistake. Joaquin then asks his parents to just continue the dinner that Juliana prepared for them without Amanda and her parents. When Chichay arrives at the restaurant, Joaquin then proceeded to introduce her as the girl that he loves. Juliana furiously left the restaurant, taking Joaquin with her and leaving Chichay crying. Betchay, who was the cook in that restaurant, tried to comfort her. At home, Juliana confronts Joaquin on what he confessed, saying that he should find someone better. The conversation ended up Juliana slapping him unintentionally. Later that night, Joaquin called Chichay through the help of their maid, Ethel. Chichay then asks him to meet with her to talk about what they are going to do after what had just happened.
61	Let The Love Begin	25.1%	November 18, 2013	#1	#3	
Chichay and Joaquin meet up at Malaya, with Joaquin asking her repeatedly what they should 'label' their relationship. In the meantime, Juliana went to the Tampipi's to offer one million pesos to Chito and Betchay, implying that in her eyes, Chichay and her family are nothing but gold diggers. Betchay in turn, throws a glass of juice at her face. After that, Chichay and Joaquin went there so that he can talk with Chito about the feelings that they have for each other but an enraged Chito confronts him, telling him to stay away from his daughter.
62	Stand By Me	23.7%	November 19, 2013	#1	#4	
Joaquin confronts her mother about what she did to Chichay's parents. Juliana then asks help and advice from her father, who instructs her to 'act' like she is in favor of the two being together. In that way, she can be able to prepare a scheme to separate her son and Chichay, while being close to them. Juliana then starts acting nice to Chichay and her family, starting by asking for their forgiveness.
63	TNT (Tayo Na Hindi Tayo)	24.2%	November 20, 2013	#1	#3	
Joaquin finally found a 'label for him and Chichay, 'TNT' meaning "Tayo na hindi Tayo" (Together but not officially). Chichay then proceeds to her examination for the Art department's Scholarship grant where she would need to paint something or someone she loves. She then asks Dominic to be her model, to which he agrees. But when he felt Joaquin became 'jealous', Dominic decided to let him replace him as her model secretly. Unfortunately, when Joaquin went to the examination where Chchay was preparing, he was surprised to discover that he is going to do nude modeling!
64	Take It Off	25.6%	November 21, 2013	#1	#3	
Joaquin goes topless for Chichay when he volunteers to be her art model, surprising yet inspiring her. While Chichay impresses her panel, she faces the dilemma of acquiring expensive materials for her next art requirements. On the other hand, Joaquin learns about the prestigious debutant's ball arranged for him by his mother. However, the smile that he gives while remembering Chichay during rehearsal gets misinterpreted by his peers.
65	Jealous	25.8%	November 22, 2013	#1	#3	
Although he finds the debutant's ball a waste of time, Joaquin becomes excited to dress up for it when Chichay tells him that she will be there as a waitress. Unknown to them, Juliana is actually at the helm of Chichay's inclusion to the party, hoping that the two's contrasting roles in it will finally make them realize that they are worlds apart.
66	Crillon Ball	26.0%	November 25, 2013	#1	#3	
Far from the magical moment she imagined, Chichay finds herself receiving back-to-back blows from Juliana and Amanda during the Crillon Ball. Keeping in mind her promise to Philip that she will not jeopardize his catering business, Chichay opts not to defend herself from Juliana and Amanda. Meanwhile, Didith and Matilda desperately find a way to be part of the prestigious ball.
67	Dance With Me	27.2%	November 26, 2013	#1	#3	
Despite her resolve not to fight back, Chichay finds good reasons not to give in to Juliana and Amanda's reprehensions and fight for her love instead, after Joaquin chooses her for the Crillon Ball's main dance. Embarrassed for what Joaquin did, Juliana decides to get rid of the Tampipis for good. Meanwhile, Chito and Betchay rush a paralyzed Isko to the hospital.
68	No Matter What	26.7%	November 27, 2013	#1	#3	
After accompanying Chichay home, Joaquin goes home to a furious Juliana, who pours out her anger and frustration over his stubbornness. On the other hand, his determination to stand up for Chichay motivates her to do the same for him and convince her family to welcome him into their world.
69	Let Me Be The One	26.9%	November 28, 2013	#1	#2	
Joaquin gets a taste of a happy family gathering with the Tampipis, and happily shares his experience to his parents after apologizing to them for his impulsive actions. While Juliana openly welcomes her son's stories, she later on calls Chichay and threatens her to stay away from Joaquin. Unfortunately for Juliana, Jaime overhears every word that she said.
70	For You	25.4%	November 29, 2013	#1	#3	
Juliana seeks Matilda's help in getting Chichay out of Joaquin's life, and their connivance bears fruit when Didith ruins Chichay's chance for a new scholarship at Malaya. Unbeknownst to Juliana, Gigi tells her on to Jaime, who berates Juliana as soon as he learns of Chichay's misfortune. Although unaware of what truly transpired, Juliana admits to Jaime how she has been trying to ruin Betchay's family in the hopes of saving theirs. To Juliana's horror, Jaime thinks that she did just the opposite.
5th most watched program in November 2013 with 25.2% average rating.

=== December 2013 ===
Episode No.	Title	Rating	Original Air Date	Timeslot Rank	Whole Day Rank	Source
71	By Your Side	26.0%	December 2, 2013	#1	#2	
Juliana pays the price for her cruelty toward the Tampipis when Jaime decides to leave her. As Juliana undergoes a difficult time accepting Jaime's decision, Joaquin stays by his mother's side throughout this ordeal. Soon, Joaquin finally discovers the roots of Juliana's animosity toward Chichay and her family. Meanwhile, the Tampipis try their best to comfort Chichay as the latter continues to worry about the possibility that she might not get the scholarship.
72	Goodbye Is Not Forever	25.9%	December 3, 2013	#1	#3	
After failing to alter Jaime's decision to break up with her, Juliana resolves to leave for America with her son. Although half-hearted, Joaquin decides to go with his mother but promises Chichay that he will return soon. Chichay, who tries to shrug off her sadness, opts to seize her remaining days with Joaquin by asking him to go out with her. Meanwhile, Ronaldo finds Joaquin's departure to America as a perfect chance for Amanda to reenter Joaquin's life.
73	Best Day Ever	27.9%	December 4, 2013	#1	#2	
Armed with the perfect gift they want to share to each other, Chichay and Joaquin meet at Casa Blanca for their farewell dinner. However, the wonderful occasion takes an ugly turn when Joaquin fails to hide his uneasiness after seeing Betchay. While Chichay tries to get Joaquin out of his discomfort, Jaime arrives at the restaurant after learning of Juliana's plan to take his son to America. As Betchay tries to appease Jaime's anger, Joaquin arrives just in time to catch Betchay holding his father's hand.
74	Before I Let You Go	28.5%	December 5, 2013	#1	#2	
Jaime's attempt to stop Juliana from taking away their son is put to waste as Joaquin remains firm in his decision to leave the country with his mother. While undergoing a difficult time intermediating between his parents, Joaquin puts the blame on Betchay for ruining his family. This prompts Chichay to realize that it is better for her and Joaquin to part ways. However, an unexpected turn of event causes Chichay to open Joaquin's gift. Upon opening the box, Chichay cannot believe her eyes as she finds the magic that once brought them together when they were young.
75	So It's You	28.0%	December 6, 2013	#1	#2	
After finding out that Joaquin was the boy she shared magic with at Piedras Platas, Chichay rushes to the airport in hopes of revealing her discovery to Joaquin. However, Chichay's efforts turn futile as the plane has already taken off for New York. Unknown to her, Joaquin avoids his flight upon learning of his mother's plan to take him to America for good. While Juliana desperately searches for her son, Joaquin calls Chichay using Poro's phone.
76	Meant To Be	27.3%	December 9, 2013	#1	#2	
Chichay feels elated as her magic dust brings Joaquin next to her again. Wasting no more time to disclose her discovery, Chichay takes Joaquin to the carnival and recalls their fateful meeting when they were young. Meanwhile, after failing to find Joaquin at the Tampipis, Juliana learns from Jaime that her son resents her for manipulating his life and for causing trouble to Chichay. Ronaldo rubs salt in Juliana's wound as he threatens to replace Joaquin as the successor of San Juan Group of Companies.
77	My Destiny	27.3%	December 10, 2013	#1	#2	
Despite knowing the extent of what the San Juans can do to protect Joaquin, Chito and Betchay give their full support to Chichay's special friendship with Joaquin. Yet, the Tampipi couple reminds their daughter of the consequences of her decision. After coming clean about the things she did against Chichay, Juliana begs Joaquin not to leave her alone. Juliana's plea, however, falls on deaf ears as Joaquin resolves to leave his mother and to start anew on his own.
78	Here To Stay	28.0%	December 11, 2013	#1	#2	
Sadness takes over Juliana as she longs for her husband and her son. While Juliana tries her best to contain the emptiness she feels inside, things just keep getting better for the Tampipis. Betchay receives an apprenticeship offer from a celebrated chef, while Chito opens up his own horror house. As for Chichay, she finally earns the freedom to spend more time with Joaquin and to express her love for the young man.
79	Take A Bow	26.9%	December 12, 2013	#1	#2	
After the successful opening of Chito's horror house, an unforeseen tragedy hits the Tampipis when Isko passes away in his sleep. Despite their attempt to conceal their sadness, the entire family succumbs to their tears as they remember their fondest memories with the old man.
80	I'll Remember	26.1%	December 13, 2013	#1	#2	
Fulfilling Isko's last request, the Tampipis wipe off their tears of sadness and turn the wake into a celebration of Isko's blissful life. While Jaime expresses his condolences to Betchay and Chito, Juliana continues to resent the Tampipis for ruining her family. Joaquin, who constantly gives moral support to Chichay, engages in a tarot card reading session with Madam Fifi. Later, Chichay learns of Madam Fifi's alarming prediction about Joaquin.
81	One Sweet Day	25.0%	December 16, 2013	#1	#4	
The Tampipis try to put on a smile as they pay their last respect to Isko. But when Chito fails to suppress his sadness, everyone breaks into tears. While Chichay and her family try to move on from Isko's death, Juliana begs Joaquin to return home before he loses everything. Joaquin, however, decides to prove his worth as a San Juan by showing to his mother and his grandfather that he can stand up on his own.
82	Hold On	24.3%	December 17, 2013	#1	#3	
After Isko's interment, Chichay returns to Malaya University and finds out about the sudden replacement of the university dean, who later advises Chichay concerning her stay in Malaya. Juliana learns that her father considers appointing an outsider as the successor of San Juan Group of Companies. Concerned about her son's future, Juliana asks Jaime to help her in convincing Joaquin to embrace his rightful position in the company. Meanwhile, Betchay prepares for a make-or-break assessment in her culinary class, but her road to success may turn rough with the presence of a familiar critic.
83	All For Love	TBA	December 18, 2013	TBA	TBA	
Juliana is far from over in her quest to ruin the Tampipis as she humiliates Betchay before everyone during the taste test. In the heated argument that ensues, Betchay discovers that Jaime has sponsored her scholarship. Meanwhile, seeing that his family will stop at nothing to get him back, Joaquin decides to take matters into his own hands to protect the woman he loves.
84	Together You and I	TBA	December 19, 2013	TBA	TBA	
Joaquin takes it upon himself to help the underprivileged students of Malaya University by spearheading a protest against the administration. However, the peaceful demonstration takes an ugly turn when Dean Leonora and the entire security team take drastic actions to stop the rallyists. Furthermore, Chichay finds herself in a difficult situation after taking a blow for Joaquin. Meanwhile, Chito confronts Jaime after learning that the latter is secretly helping Betchay in her studies.
85	Too Many Walls	22.4%	December 20, 2013	#1	#3	
Knowing that his mother has something to do with the intense outcome of the student rally, Joaquin blames himself for putting Chichay's safety at risk. With that, Joaquin exerts great efforts to take care of Chichay. However, fearing for what Juliana might do next against his daughter, Chito insists that it is his responsibility to protect Chichay, not Joaquin's. While Jaime confronts Juliana for humiliating Betchay in Casa Blanca, the Malayans commend Joaquin as his courageous efforts to fight for the students' rights bring in good results.
86	Consequences	22.7%	December 23, 2013	#2	#2	
Sick of her futile efforts to make her family complete, Juliana shrugs off her miseries and returns to San Juan Group of Companies with a new mindset. Juliana's sudden submission of pursuing Joaquin's rights to the company leads Ronaldo to take the matters into his own hands. Later, Ronaldo learns of Juliana's secret transactions regarding the ownership of the theme park where Chito works, and it gives the old man a better idea on how he can get back at the Tampipis. Meanwhile, trying to help Dominic in getting over his feelings for Chichay, Patricia urges him to divert his attention to other people.
87	Hanggang Sa Muli (Until Then)	18.6%	December 24, 2013	#3	#1	
In order to save his family from more harm caused by the San Juans, Chito resolves to accept the job offer to move to the province and run a carnival there. He tells Chichay of his plan to relocate the whole family as soon as possible and asks her not to reveal to Joaquin details of their departure. Chichay is left with no choice but to obey her father, even though tears of sadness start to flow at the thought of leaving Joaquin.
88	Sana Ngayong Pasko (Hopefully this Christmas)	20.9%	December 25, 2013	#2	#2	
Chichay becomes emotional on her last day in Malaya University, but she manages to make alibis to keep Joaquin from finding out the reason behind her tears. The next day, Patricia tells Joaquin that Chichay is gone, but Joaquin refuses to believe her and goes straight to the Tampipi residence. While Joaquin sheds tears of sadness and confusion, Ronaldo gladly informs Juliana that their problem regarding the Tampipis is finally solved.
89	Changes In My Life	25.1%	December 26, 2013	#2	#2	
The Tampipis move to their new home with high hopes of starting their life anew far from the San Juans, leaving Joaquin dismayed by Chichay's unanticipated departure. Meanwhile, a guilt-stricken Juliana becomes half-hearted with her revenge against Chichay's family as she tries to reach out to Joaquin.
90	Where You Are	24.0%	December 27, 2013	#3	#1	
Upset about being left behind by the one person he loves most, Joaquin tells Chichay that it is better for them to forget about each other. Joaquin tries to wipe out his sadness and frustrations by hanging out in a nightclub with Kit and his friends. Chichay soon learns about the boys' night out and hopes that Joaquin would be able to move on with his life without her. While the Tampipis slowly put the carnival in order, Jaime warns Juliana to stop messing with the Manansala Construction.
91	Till My Heartaches End	23.3%	December 30, 2013	#3	#1	
While trying to ease her loneliness for Joaquin, Chichay meets Pedro, a nasty young man who turns out to be a staff at the carnival. Meanwhile, setting her personal feelings aside, Amanda saves Joaquin from Didith's malicious intentions and reveals that Ronaldo has something to do with Chichay's sudden departure. Following Amanda's enlightening pieces of advice, Joaquin resolves to look for Chichay by all means.
92	You're Still The One	17.2%	December 31, 2013	#1	#1	
Joaquin and Dominic join forces in finding Chichay. After meeting the Bright Star City owner and getting in touch with Bubbles through Facebook, the two young men finally succeed in locating the Tampipis. Meanwhile, Chichay reconciles with Pedro but asks him to refrain from talking about Joaquin. With the downfall of the Manansala Construction, Juliana refuses to extend any help to Jaime. At Star Dust, a girl wearing a "manananggal" costume catches Joaquin's attention.
8th most watched program from January to December 2013 with 27.6% average rating.

=== January 2014 ===
Episode No.	Title	Rating	Original Air Date	Timeslot Rank	Whole Day Rank	Source
93	Scared To Death	21.8%	January 1, 2014	#1	#3	
Despite being within his arm's reach, Joaquin decides not to talk to Chichay anymore and leave her and her family at peace. Meanwhile, Chichay gets an inkling that Joaquin knows where she and her family are after her friend at Star Dust mentions someone was looking for her.
94	Reaching Out	25.1%	January 2, 2014	#2	#2	
While Joaquin slowly adjusts to his new life, Jaime finds it hard to land a job because of his publicized falling out with the San Juans. Dominic, meanwhile, admits to Patricia that he is tired of helping Joaquin and will court Chichay himself.
95	Here I Am	24.4%	January 3, 2014	#1	#2	
Despite their mutual affection, Chichay and Joaquin resolve to part ways knowing the tough situation the Tampipis' are in. Meanwhile, Chito learns of his daughter's secret meeting with Joaquin and soon argues with his family about what is best for Chichay. Trying not to let Joaquin and Chichay pay the consequences of his past mistakes, Jaime comes up with a plan to escape the manipulating hands of the San Juans. Meanwhile, Armand's latest news about the father and son troubles Juliana.
96	Right Beside You	24.7%	January 6, 2014	#1	#3	
While Jaime successfully deceives the San Juans into believing that Joaquin is also in Hong Kong, Joaquin reconciles with the Tampipis as they welcome him back to the family. However, the seemingly brilliant idea immediately loses its foundation when Dominic visits Chichay and sees Joaquin with her.
97	Part Of Your World	23.3%	January 7, 2014	#1	#3	
Dominic confides to Patricia his discovery on Jaime and Joaquin's ruse. When Patricia makes him realize that he can use such information to his advantage, Dominic pays Juliana a visit. Elsewhere, Matilda gets someone to spy on Bright Star City when someone complains to her of its strength in the carnival business.
98	You Belong With Me	23.7%	January 8, 2014	#1	#3	
Matilda hits two birds with one stone when her hired spy discovers that Chito is the one who runs Bright Star City and that Joaquin is actually with the Tampipis. Wanting to reconnect with the wealthy San Juans, Matilda informs Juliana about it at once. When Juliana double-checks Matilda's revelation, she gets hurt upon seeing Joaquin enjoy the company of her enemies. Although refusing Matilda's offer to take down Bright Star City, Juliana renews her determination to break Joaquin's trust on the Tampipis.
99	Danger In Love	23.1%	January 9, 2014	#1	#3	
Tinyong, Matilda's hired spy and driver, takes interest on the Tampipis upon learning that the San Juans' heir is living with them. Tinyong then applies at Bright Star City, and despite Tinyong's admission that he is Asiong's brother, Chito gives Tinyong the benefit of the doubt. Unbeknownst to Chito, the newest addition to his carnival family is the one who will expose his darkest secret. Meanwhile, Jaime finds himself uncertain of his future in Hong Kong.
100	The Past	23.4%	January 10, 2014	#1	#3	
Chito finds himself behind bars when the police suddenly arrest him for attempted murder and illegal possession of firearms. Despite the possibility that Chito was the one who accidentally shot him in the head, Joaquin goes to Juliana and begs her to spare Chito. When his tearful pleas fall on deaf ears, Joaquin resolves to have the bullet in his head removed just to prove Chito's innocence.
101	Victims Of Love	23.4%	January 13, 2014	#1	#4	
Instead of being relieved by Chito's imprisonment, Juliana becomes more troubled by her irreparable actions in the past. Meanwhile, Joaquin becomes firmly decided to have the bullet taken out of his head despite the doctor's dissuasion. Unwilling to have his parents decide his fate during the operation, Joaquin turns to the remaining option and asks Chichay to marry him.
102	Hang On	22.9%	January 14, 2014	#2	#4	
Chichay's blunt rejection and Betchay's sound advice finally dissuade Joaquin from undergoing brain surgery. Still, Joaquin finds new hope with Jaime's return from Hong Kong. Unbeknownst to Joaquin, the ally he expects to be in Jaime is waning as Jaime now begins to believe that Juliana has been right about the Tampipis' brainwashing of Joaquin all along.
103	I Will Be Here To Stay	22.1%	January 15, 2014	#1	#4	
Atty. Sarabia informs the Tampipis that the judge handling Chito's case has an apparent favoring of the prosecution. To make matters worse, Bright Star City's higher-ups find the need to replace Chito as their carnival's operations manager. While Betchay turns to Jaime for help, Pedro blames Joaquin for the Tampipis' suffering. In his anger, Joaquin punches a tree. When Jaime sees Joaquin's bloody knuckles, he brings his son to the doctor. Much to Jaime and the doctor's surprise, Joaquin claims not feeling any pain at all.
104	Never Say Die	23.5%	January 16, 2014	#1	#3	
Determined to help with Chito's bail, Joaquin goes to Malaya to sell Chichay's paintings. Unaware of Joaquin's mission, Jaime and the Tampipis panic when Joaquin fails to come home that night. To everyone's relief, Joaquin returns the next day, but when Joaquin cannot recall everything that happened to him the day before, Jaime begins to suspect that something is wrong with Joaquin. Jaime then consults with Dr. Alferos. While Dr. Alferos enumerates to Jaime the symptoms of simple partial seizure, Joaquin has hallucinations back at Poro's house.
105	Almost There	23.4%	January 17, 2014	#2	#3	
Jaime relays to Joaquin Dr. Alferos' advice that they consult with a brain specialist abroad. Thinking that his parents are now conniving to keep him and Chichay apart, Joaquin insists that there is nothing wrong with his brain. However, when his hallucinations worsen and when he discovers Jaime's solo efforts to raise money, Joaquin goes to Juliana himself and asks for her help so he can immediately undergo a brain surgery. Unaware of the symptoms Joaquin has been showing the past few days, Juliana turns a deaf ear to her son.
106	Best Date Ever	24.0%	January 20, 2014	#1	#3	
Juliana finally learns about her son's dire situation and, together with Jaime, rushes to send Joaquin to immediate medical attention. However, Joaquin is with Chichay, refusing her pleas to return to his father and only agreeing if she joins him for a ride to the best date that he promised.
107	Until Then	25.3%	January 21, 2014	#1	#3	
When their best date turns disastrous, Chichay finally surrenders the unconscious Joaquin to his parents, who, in turn, admit Joaquin to a hospital in Manila. Joaquin then regains consciousness and asks his parents for Chichay, but when they refuse to let him go, Joaquin escapes for Bright Star City. Alerted by Juliana about her role in helping Joaquin undergo his much needed brain surgery, Chichay fools Joaquin into believing that she does not love him anymore. Hurt, Joaquin runs in the rain with his head bowed down, failing to see the van that is fast approaching him.
