= Hallissey =

Surname

- Gender: Unisex
- Language: English

Origin
- Language: Irish
- Origin: Ó hÁilgheasa
- Meaning: "descendant of Áilgheas"

Other names
- Cognates: Hallessy, Hallisey, Hallisy, Hallissy, Hallisay, Halasey, O Hallishy, O Hallyse

Hallissey is an English-language surname, derived from the Irish-language, and traditionally associated with the Irish counties of Cork and Kerry.

== Etymology ==
The name is derived from the Irish Ó hÁilgheasa, a patronym meaning "descendant of Áilgheas". The latter personal name is derived from the Irish áilgheas, meaning "eagerness". The modern Irish form of the name is Ó hÁileasa.

== Cognates ==
Other English-language surnames cognate to Hallissey include Hallessy, Hallisey, Hallisy, Hallissy, Hallisay, Halasey, O Hallishy, and O Hallyse.

== Distribution ==
The surname Hallissey is traditionally found in County Cork and County Kerry, particularly in west Cork and south Kerry.

== People ==
=== Hallisey ===
- Caroline Hallisey, American speed skater
- Charles Hallisey, lecturer on Buddhist literature
- Connor Hallisey, American soccer player
- Kathleen Hallisey Rubins, American microbiologist and astronaut
- Laura Hallisey, American curler
- Olivia Hallisey, American student who invented a rapid test for Ebola

=== Hallissey ===
- Claire Hallissey, British marathon runner
- Matteo Hallissey, Italian politician

=== Hallisay ===
- Brian Hallisay, American actor
