= Borini =

Borini is an Italian surname. Notable people with the surname include:

- Fabio Borini (born 1991), Italian footballer
- Joyce Borini (born 1988), Brazilian footballer
- Marisa Borini (born 1930), Italian concert pianist and actress
