= Hôtel de France =

1987 film

- Film poster
- Directed by: Patrice Chéreau
- Written by: Patrice Chéreau; Anton Chekhov; Jean-François Goyet
- Produced by: Claude Berri; Helène Vager
- Starring: Laurent Grévill
- Cinematography: Pascal Marti
- Edited by: Albert Jurgenson
- Release date: 20 May 1987
- Running time: 98 minutes
- Country: France
- Language: French

Hôtel de France is a 1987 French drama film directed by Patrice Chéreau. It was screened in the Un Certain Regard section at the 1987 Cannes Film Festival.

The film was an adaptation of the 1878 play Platonov by Anton Chekhov, previously adapted for a stage production for the theatre school of the Théâtre des Amandiers and directed by Chéreau. It concerns a young man, Michel and a young woman, Sonia, once in love, who meet again after several years.

== Cast ==
- Laurent Grévill - Michel
- Valeria Bruni Tedeschi - Sonia
- Vincent Perez - Serge
- Laura Benson - Anna
- Thibault de Montalembert - Nicolas
- Marc Citti - Philippe Galtier
- Bernard Nissile - Richard Veninger
- Marianne Denicourt - Catherine
- Isabelle Renauld - Marie
- Bruno Todeschini - Bouguereau
- Agnès Jaoui - Mme Bouguereau
- Hélène de Saint-Père - Mme Petitjean
- Thierry Ravel - Manu
- Dominic Gould - a companion of Manu
- Foued Nassah - a companion of Manu
- Franck Demules - a waiter
