= Iman Perez =

French model and actress (born 1999)

- Born: 2 May 1999 (age 27); Paris, France
- Occupations: Actress, model
- Parents: Vincent Perez; Karine Silla
- Relatives: Virginie Besson-Silla (aunt)
- Modeling information
- Height: 1.75 m (5 ft 9 in)
- Hair color: Brown
- Eye color: Hazel
- Agency: Next Model Management (Paris, New York, Milan)

Iman Perez (born 2 May 1999) is a French model and actress.

== Early life ==
Perez was born in Paris. Her father, Vincent Perez, is a Swiss actor of German and Spanish origin. Her mother, Karine Silla, is a Senegalese-French actress, film director, and screenwriter. She has one older half-sister, Roxane Depardieu – daughter of Gerard Depardieu, and a younger brother and sister – twins: Pablo and Tess Perez. Iman and her siblings grew up in Paris, and attended the International School of Paris hence their proficiency in both French and English. However, she finished her school years online.

== Career ==
Perez started her career as an actress, starring in her first movie in 2011. In 2015, she signed with her modeling agency Next Model Management, and a few months later, she was one of the 21 young girls selected to participate in the 2015 edition of the Bal des débutantes in Paris. She had since become Jean Paul Gaultier muse.

She worked for numerous fashion and women's magazines such as Flaunt, Harper's Bazaar, L'Officiel, Madame Figaro, and Vogue. Perez has posed for the likes of Peter Lindbergh and Paolo Roversi. She has worked with brands such as Chloé, Dior, H&M, Hermès, Longines, and Zadig & Voltaire. Throughout the years, Perez has grown as a model, and is considered to be a "it girl" and "top model" to quote numerous tabloid magazines.

=== Equestrian ===
Perez is also a horse rider, competing in international shows in Europe. She started competing at the age of seven. Starting in 2016, she has been riding under the colors of Renault in international shows. In November 2017, it has been announced that Perez was the face of Miasuki (an elite equestrian clothing brand) and is currently riding under their colors. She rides alongside other celebrities such as Jessica Springsteen, Jennifer Gates (daughter of Bill and Melinda Gates) and French actor Guillaume Canet.

=== Filmography ===
- 2011 – Un Baiser Papillon, directed by Karine Silla – role: Fleur
- 2023 – Le Petit Blond de la Casbah, directed by Alexandre Arcady – role: Josette
- 2023 – Une affaire d'honneur, directed by Vincent Perez – role: Anaïs
