= It's Easier for a Camel... =

2003 film

- Film poster
- Directed by: Valeria Bruni Tedeschi
- Written by: Valeria Bruni Tedeschi; Noémie Lvovsky; Agnès de Sacy
- Produced by: Paulo Branco; Maurizio Antonini; Mimmo Calopresti
- Starring: Valeria Bruni Tedeschi
- Cinematography: Jeanne Lapoirie
- Edited by: Anne Weil
- Distributed by: Gemini Films
- Release date: 16 April 2003
- Running time: 110 minutes
- Country: France
- Language: French
- Budget: $2.1 million
- Box office: $3.2 million

It's Easier for a Camel... (French: Il est plus facile pour un chameau...) is a 2003 French comedy film written, directed by and starring Valeria Bruni Tedeschi. It was entered into the 25th Moscow International Film Festival and was screened in competition at the 1st World Film Festival of Bangkok. It won the Louis Delluc Prize for Best First Film in 2003.

Tedeschi won prizes for Emerging Narrative Filmmaker and Best Actress at the 2003 Tribeca Film Festival.

Film historian Tim Palmer described the film an engaging example of contemporary French pop-art cinema, referring to directors who wittily merge the features of intellectual/arthouse cinema with mass/popular cinema, and put director Tedeschi in the company of filmmakers such as François Ozon, Maîwenn le Besco, Sophie Fillières and Serge Bozon.

== Cast ==
- Valeria Bruni Tedeschi as Federica
- Chiara Mastroianni as Bianca
- Jean-Hugues Anglade as Pierre
- Denis Podalydès as Philippe
- Marisa Bruni Tedeschi as Mother (as Marysa Borini)
- Roberto Herlitzka as Father
- Lambert Wilson as Aurelio
- Pascal Bongard as Priest
- Nicolas Briançon as Director
- Yvan Attal as Man in Park
- Emmanuelle Devos as Philippe's Wife

== Reception ==
On the review aggregator website Rotten Tomatoes, 46% of 13 critics' reviews are positive, with an average rating of 5.3/10. Metacritic, which uses a weighted average, assigned the film a score of 53 out of 100, based on 8 critics, indicating "mixed or average" reviews.
