= Virginie Besson-Silla =

French film producer (born 1972)

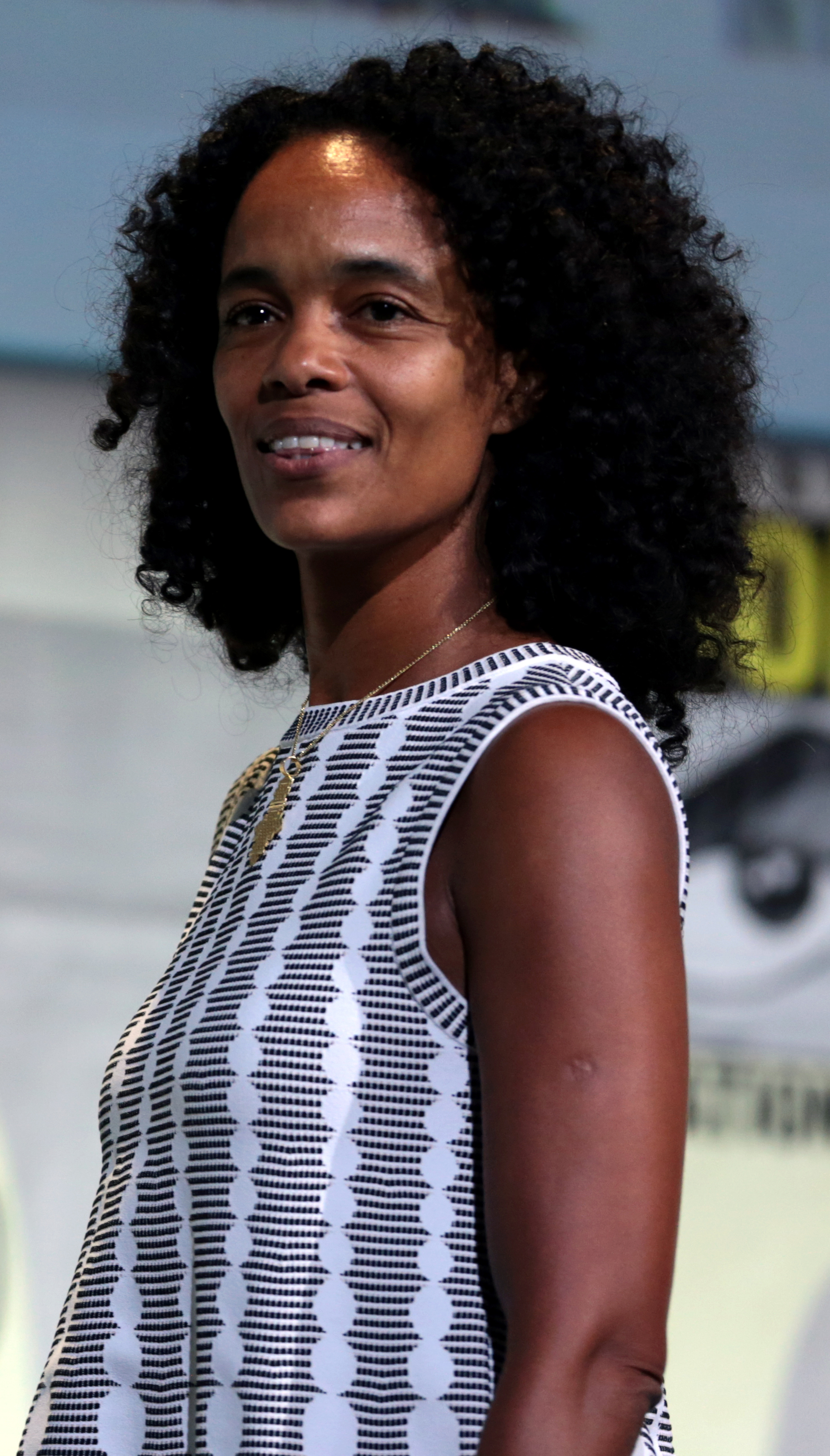
- Besson-Silla at the 2016 San Diego Comic-Con
- Born: Virginie Silla; 1972 (age 53–54); Ottawa, Ontario, Canada
- Other name: Virginie Silla-Besson
- Occupation: Film producer
- Years active: 2001–present
- Spouse: Luc Besson (m. 2004)
- Children: 3, including Thalia Besson
- Relatives: Iman Perez (niece)

Virginie Besson-Silla (born 1972) is a French film producer. She has made a variety of different films including action films, romantic films, comic adaptations, biographical films and an animation.

== Life and career ==
Silla was born in Ottawa, Ontario, the daughter of a Senegalese diplomat and a French physiotherapist. She is the sister-in-law of actor Vincent Perez by her sister, Karine Silla, who is an actress and author.

Since her marriage in 2004 to Luc Besson, Virginie has been known as Virginie Silla-Besson or Virginie Besson-Silla. The couple has three children, including the actress Thalia Besson.

In 2010, Time quoted Luc saying she was a more perfect producer than he was and that she hereby enabled him to focus on directing his artistically most demanding, sumptuous film The Lady (2011).

== Filmography ==
- 2001: Yamakasi
- 2002: Peau d'Ange
- 2003: La Felicita, le bonheur ne coûte rien
- 2004: À ton image
- 2005: Au suivant !
- 2005: Revolver
- 2006: Love and Other Disasters
- 2007: The Secret
- 2010: From Paris with Love
- 2010: The Extraordinary Adventures of Adèle Blanc-Sec
- 2011: The Lady
- 2012: La mécanique du cœur
- 2013: The Dream Kids
- 2014: 3 Days to Kill
- 2014: Lucy
- 2017: Valerian and the City of a Thousand Planets
- 2024: Weekend in Taipei
- 2025: Dracula
