= Hélène de Saint-Père =

French actress (1963–2022)

- Born: 7 June 1963; Brazzaville, French Congo
- Died: 4 May 2022 (aged 58); Brussels, Belgium
- Education: Cours Florent
- Occupation: Actress

Hélène de Saint-Père (7 June 1963 – 4 May 2022) was a French actress.

== Partial filmography ==
- Hôtel de France
- Peau d'Ange
- Vendredi soir
