= Once Upon an Angel =

- Theatrical release poster
- Directed by: Vincent Perez
- Screenplay by: Karine Silla; Vincent Perez; Jérôme Tonnerre
- Dialogue by: Karine Silla
- Produced by: Virginie Silla
- Starring: Morgane Moré; Guillaume Depardieu; Magali Woch; Karine Silla; Hélène de Saint-Père; Stéphane Boucher; Michel Vuillermoz; Esse Lawson; Maryline Even
- Cinematography: Philippe Pavans de Ceccatty
- Edited by: Laurence Briaud
- Music by: Replicant
- Production companies: EuropaCorp; Buffalo Films; TF1 Films Production
- Distributed by: EuropaCorp
- Release dates: 24 August 2002 (Montreal); 9 October 2002 (France)
- Running time: 85 minutes
- Country: France
- Language: French
- Budget: €4.3 million

Once Upon an Angel (French: Peau d'ange, lit. 'Angel Skin') is a 2002 French romantic drama film directed by Vincent Perez, starring Morgane Moré and Guillaume Depardieu.

== Plot ==
Grégoire reluctantly returns to the countryside in order to oversee his mother's funeral. Being back in the small town where he was raised upsets him, as he is not ready yet to accept the fact his mother died. While looking for some comfort and solace, he meets a maid named Angèle. He manages to impress her by making up he was an important manager, although he only has a minor position in a cosmetics company. After they have spent the night in a hotel, he just leaves her but she cannot forget him, in particular because he was her first lover at all. Subsequently, she follows him and even manages to get hired as the maid of one of his colleagues. However, she then has to realise that Grégoire is about to become the son-in-law of his boss. Angèle observes how he is going to marry another woman for other reasons than love.

== Cast ==
- Morgane Moré as Angèle
- Guillaume Depardieu as Grégoire
- Dominique Blanc as Sister Augustine
- Karine Silla as Laure
- Magali Woch as Josiane
- Valeria Bruni-Tedeschi as Angèle's solicitor
- Olivier Gourmet as Faivre
- Marine Delterme as Faivre's wife
- Michel Vuillermoz as Grégoire's uncle
- Esse Lawson as Amira
- Hélène de Saint-Père as Ms Artaud
- Laurent Terzieff as Mr Grenier
- Maryline Even as Jocelyne
- André Marcon as Angèle's father
- Stéphane Boucher as Doctor Artaud

== Release ==
Once Upon an Angel premiered at the Montreal World Film Festival on 24 August 2002, and was screened at the Festival International du Film Francophone de Namur on 28 September 2002. The film was released in France on 9 October 2002. An English subtitled direct-to-video version, including a making-of, a soundtrack, deleted scenes, a film poster and two short films, was released on 28 May 2003.

== Accolades ==
At the Cabourg Film Festival 2003, Moré was awarded the Swann d'Or for Best Actress.

== Critical response ==
Vincent Perez makes an interesting behind-the-camera debut with Once Upon an Angel, a smartly put together, well-cast romantic drama that just needed a little more work on the script. Tale of a simple farm girl who loses her virginity to – but not her love for – a more emotionally complex, ambitious young man doesn't add up to a great deal, but features good perfs by leads Morgane More and Guillaume Depardieu

— Derek Elley – Variety

Perez, who co-wrote the screenplay with wife, Karine Silla (Laure Grenier in the film), directs with a restraint that elegantly counterbalances the material. Although we can see the direction the film is taking, the plot devices, contrivances and import of the each scene are so understated that their impact isn't fully realised until the end-titles roll. When you reach that point, the full force of the film becomes apparent.

— Noel Megahey – The Digital Fix
