= Il commissario Lo Gatto =

1986 film

- Film poster
- Directed by: Dino Risi
- Written by: Dino Risi; Enrico Vanzina
- Produced by: Pio Angeletti; Adriano De Micheli
- Starring: Lino Banfi
- Cinematography: Alessandro D'Eva
- Music by: Manuel De Sica
- Release date: 1986
- Running time: 91 minutes
- Country: Italy
- Language: Italian

Il commissario Lo Gatto (transl. Police Commissioner Lo Gatto) is a 1986 Italian comedy film directed by Dino Risi. It was shown as part of a retrospective on Italian comedy at the 67th Venice International Film Festival.

== Cast ==
- Lino Banfi as Commissario Natale Lo Gatto
- Maurizio Ferrini as Agente Gino Gridelli
- Maurizio Micheli as Vito Ragusa
- Isabel Russinova as Wilma Cerulli / Maria Papetti
- Galeazzo Benti as Barone Fricò
- Renata Attivissimo as Addolorata Patanè
- Nicoletta Boris as Annunziata Patanè
- Albano Bufalini as The Pharmacist
- Alberto Capone
- Roberto Della Casa as Architetto Arcuni
- Gianni Franco as Pedretti - aka Bazooka
- Marcello Furgiele as Mario - the lifeguard
- Licinia Lentini as Mrs. Bellugi
- Armando Marra as The Barber
- Valeria Milillo as Manuela Bellugi
- Andrea Montuschi as Don Giacomo - the priest
- Gianluigi Pizzetti as Ingegner Bellugi
- Antonella Voce as Immacolata Patanè
