= Notes of Love =

- Directed by: Mimmo Calopresti
- Starring: Valeria Bruni Tedeschi; Fabrizio Bentivoglio; Gérard Depardieu
- Cinematography: Alessandro Pesci
- Music by: Franco Piersanti
- Release date: 1998
- Countries: Italy; France

Notes of Love (Italian: La parola amore esiste, French: Mots d'amour, also known as The Word Love Exists and Love Notes) is a 1998 Italian-French romance film directed by Mimmo Calopresti. For her performance Valeria Bruni Tedeschi won the David di Donatello Award for best actress. The film also won the Nastro d'Argento for best script and the Ciak d'oro for best supporting actress (to Marina Confalone).

== Synopsis ==
Angela is a thirty-year-old woman navigating life through a complex web of compulsions and superstitions. She believes certain colors bring bad luck, particular numbers are cursed, and that fate guides her destiny. Desperate to prove that love is possible, Angela becomes fixated on Marco, a divorced cello instructor she's never properly met. Convinced that the stars have aligned for their connection, she embarks on an unconventional courtship, leaving handwritten poems and notes in his mailbox rather than risk the vulnerability of a face-to-face introduction.As Angela's obsessive behavior intensifies, the film explores whether her manufactured destiny will blossom into genuine connection or dissolve into the lonely confusion that has defined her search for love—a tender, melancholic tale about desire, isolation, and the human longing for emotional reciprocation.

== Cast ==
- Valeria Bruni Tedeschi: Angela
- Fabrizio Bentivoglio: Marco
- Gérard Depardieu: Lawyer Levi
- Mimmo Calopresti: Analyst
- Valeria Milillo: Giovanna
- Marina Confalone: Sara
- Daria Nicolodi: Mother of Angela
- Massimo Bonetti: Bruno
