= Valeria Milillo =

Italian actress

- Born: 25 September 1966 (age 59); Milan, Italy
- Occupation: Actress

Valeria Milillo (born 25 September 1966) is an Italian actress.

== Life and career ==
Born in Milan, Milillo studied acting at the Accademia dei Filodrammatici in Milan, and attended stage courses in Rome, Paris, Berlin, Vienna, Zurich, and Munich. She made her film debut in 1987 in the Dino Risi's comedy film Il commissario Lo Gatto. Active in films, television and on stage, in 2009 she was nominated in the best supporting actress category at the Nastro d'Argento for Francesca Archibugi's The Ladies Get Their Say.

== Selected filmography ==
- Il commissario Lo Gatto (1987)
- Dinner with a Vampire (1988)
- Traces of an Amorous Life (1990)
- Red American (1991)
- The End Is Known (1992)
- The Second Time (1995)
- Freshwater Man (1997)
- Notes of Love (1998)
- Don't Make Any Plans for Tonight (2006)
- A Game for Girls (2008)
- The Ladies Get Their Say (2009)
