= Marisa Borini =

Italian pianist and actress

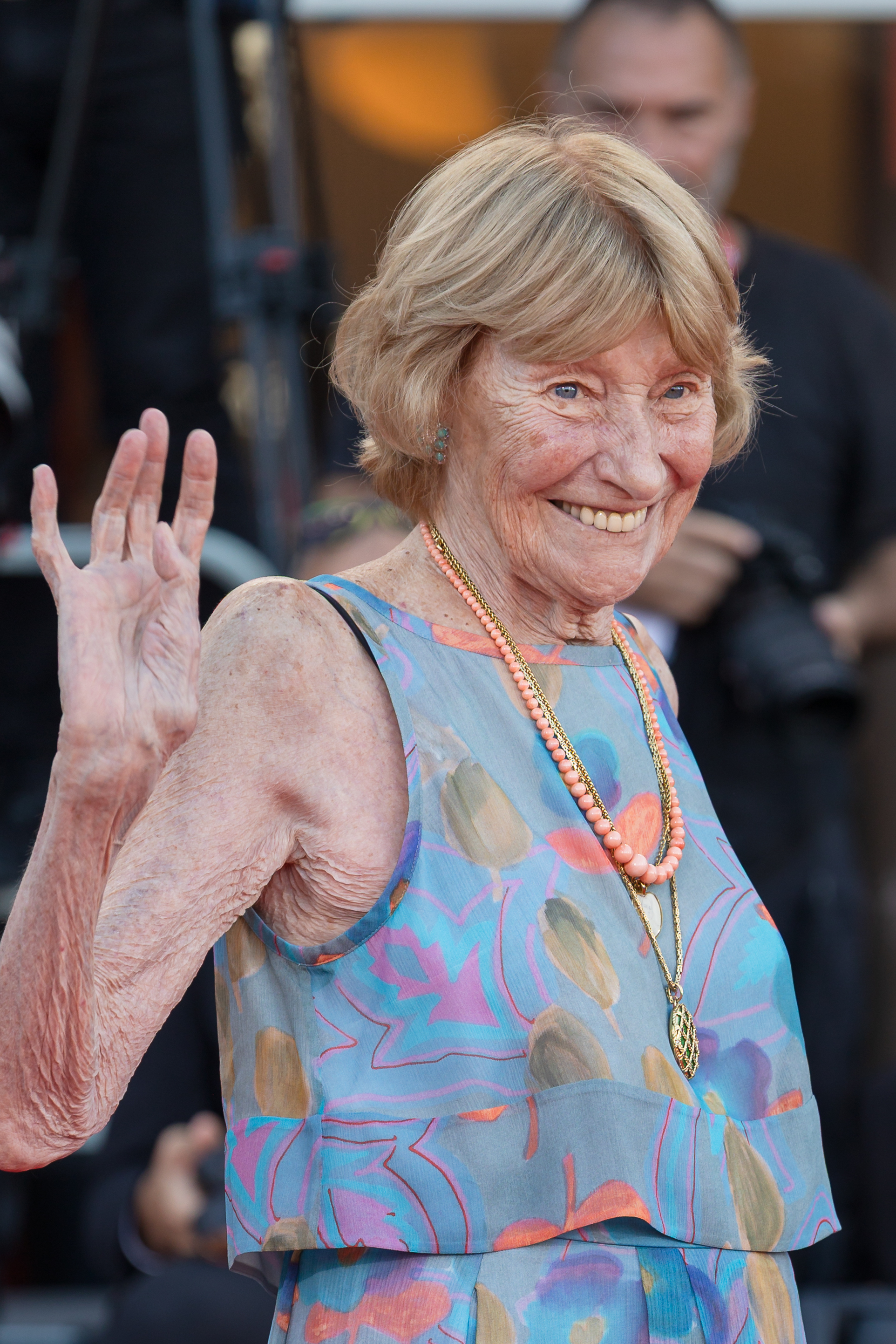
Borini in 2025

Marisa Borini (sometimes Marysa Borini or Marisa Bruni-Tedeschi; born 1 April 1930) is an Italian concert pianist and actress.

== Life and career ==
Born in Turin, Italy in 1930 to a mother originally from Savoie, France (Renée Planche, daughter of Deputy Francois Gilbert Planche) and an Italian engineer father (Carlo Domenico Borini), originally from Piedmont. She is married to the Italian industrialist and classical composer Alberto Bruni Tedeschi and they have three children:

- A son, Virginio, a photographer who died of AIDS (1960–2006)
- The actress and director Valeria Bruni-Tedeschi, born 16 November 1964
- The singer-songwriter and model Carla Bruni, born 23 December 1967, who later married French President Nicolas Sarkozy. Her biological father is guitarist Maurizio Remmert who Marisa had a relationship with from 1960 to 1967.

In 1973, Marisa and her husband went into exile in Paris, officially to escape the Italian communist Red Brigades, but also due to the bankruptcy of the family business, CEAT, later bought by the Pirelli group.

In 2003, she played the mother of the Valeria Bruni-Tedeschi and Chiara Mastroianni in a semi-biographical film also written and directed by Bruni-Tedeschi, Il est plus facile pour un chameau... (It's Easier for a Camel). She also plays her real-life daughter's mother in her films Actrices and Un chateau en Italie. For the latter, she was nominated for the César for Best Supporting Actress at the 2014 César Awards.

== Film and television work ==
- 2003 : Il est plus facile pour un chameau... directed by Valeria Bruni Tedeschi
- 2005 : La Petite Chartreuse directed by Jean-Pierre Denis adapted from the novel of the same name by Pierre Péju
- 2005 : La Boîte noire directed by Richard Berry.
- 2007 : Actrices directed by Valeria Bruni Tedeschi.
- 2013 : Un château en Italie directed by Valeria Bruni Tedeschi.
- 2016 : Folles de joie directed by Paolo Virzì.
- 2018 : Les Estivants directed by Valeria Bruni Tedeschi
- 2022 : Capitaine Marleau, episode "Héros malgré lui" directed by Josée Dayan
- TBA : Santo Subito! directed by Bertrand Bonello

== Books ==
Bruni-Tedeschi, Marisa (2016). Mes chères filles, je vais vous raconter... Paris: Éditions Robert Laffont. ISBN 978-2-221-19314-3.
