= Bal des débutantes =

French debutante ball

Le Bal des Débutantes
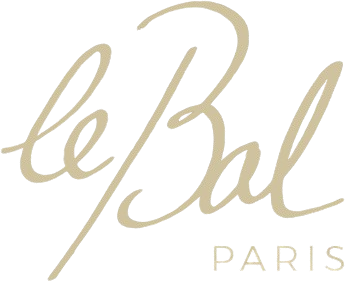

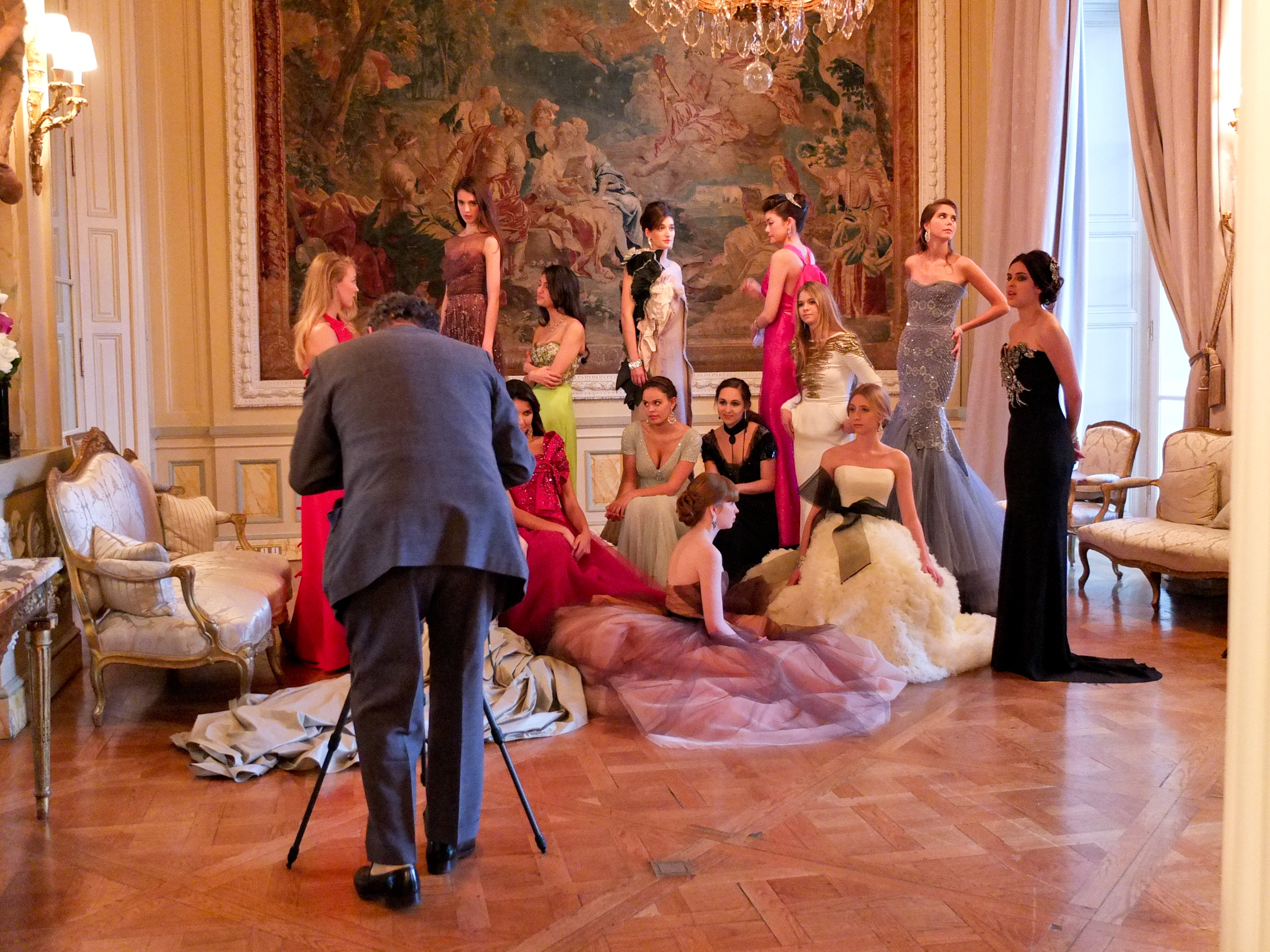
- Vanity Fair photo shoot with the 2011 debutantes
- Genre: Debutante ball
- Frequency: Annually
- Locations: Paris, France
- Inaugurated: 1992
- Organiser: Ophélie Renouard
- Website: lebal.paris

Le Bal des Débutantes, also known as le Bal (previously called the Crillon Ball), is a debutante ball and fashion event in Paris that is held annually in November. It brings together between 20 and 25 debutantes (aged 16 to 22) from many countries. It is based on the original social event which was first held in the Orangery of the Château de Versailles in 1958 but then canceled in 1968.

== History ==
The original ball started as a social event and was first held in the Orangery of the Château de Versailles on 10 July 1958. There were fifty debutantes, all of whom were American. For the ball of 1959, permission to use the Orangery came from André Malraux; the event was financed by the fashion and perfume houses of Paris. A hundred and fifty young women took part. The event was not held in 1968 due to the May 68 worker uprising in France, and it was subsequently canceled.

The ball was revived in 1992 by Ophélie Renouard as a fashion event when she worked at the Hôtel de Crillon. From 1992 to 2012, it took place every year at the Hôtel de Crillon, and thus was often called the Crillon Ball. Since the location is currently not fixed, the event is now referred to simply as le Bal.

The event also serves as a fundraiser. From 2009 to 2019, it supported Enfants d'Asie, an organization which provides education for girls in Southeast Asia. In 2022, it supported the ARCFA (Association pour la Recherche en Cardiologie du Fœtus à l'Adulte) of the Necker–Enfants Malades Hospital and the World Central Kitchen.

== Participants ==
The debutantes often come from families known in European aristocracy, entertainment, business, or politics, and they are selected by Renouard. From 2000 to 2003, le Bal welcomed a winner from a contest held by the French magazine Jalouse every year. Each winner was chosen based on a submitted application. Other debutantes have been famous in their own right; a few years ago, Lauren Marbe – the daughter of a cab driver in the UK whose IQ exceeded Einstein's – and (in 2015) Olivia Hallisey – an American high schooler who won the first prize of the Google Science Fair for inventing a test for the Ebola virus – debuted. In 2022, Chinese freestyle skier Eileen Gu attended le Bal after winning two gold medals at the 2022 Winter Olympics.

Each debutante is escorted by a cavalier. The cavalier may be a young man of the debutante's choosing, such as a brother, cousin, friend, or boyfriend. However, nearly half of the debutantes, particularly those travelling from abroad, don't bring their own cavalier; they rely instead on the organizers of le Bal to find them a cavalier. The organizer, Renouard, has stated that they choose the cavaliers based on their ages, the languages they speak, their heights, and possibly their backgrounds to produce an optimal match for the debutantes.

=== Notable debutantes ===
- Delphine Arnault (born 1975), French businesswoman and daughter of LVMH chairman Bernard Arnault
- Leah Isadora Behn (born 2005), daughter of Princess Märtha Louise of Norway and Ari Behn
- Barbara Berlusconi (born 1984), Italian business executive and daughter of Italian Prime Minister and convict Silvio Berlusconi
- Princess Eugénie of Bourbon (born 2007), daughter of Prince Louis Alphonse, Duke of Anjou
- Princess Maria Carolina of Bourbon-Two Sicilies (born 2003), heiress-apparent of the House of Bourbon-Two Sicilies, daughter of Prince Carlo, Duke of Castro
- Princess Maria Francisca of Portugal (born 1997), daughter of Duarte Pio, Duke of Braganza
- Donna Bianca Brandolini d'Adda (born 1987), Italian socialite, model, social media influencer, and daughter of Princess Georgina de Faucigny-Lucinge et Coligny
- Céline Buckens (born 1996), Belgian-British actress
- Lauren Bush (born 1984), American fashion executive, granddaughter of 41st U.S. President George H. W. Bush, niece of 43rd U.S. President George W. Bush
- Anna Cleveland (born 1989), American-Dutch model and daughter of Pat Cleveland
- Lily Collins (born 1989), British-American actress and daughter of Phil Collins
- Anouchka Delon (born 1990), French-Dutch actress and daughter of Alain Delon
- Princess Fawzia-Latifa of Egypt (born 1982), daughter of King Fuad II
- Caroline Ghosn (born 1987), American businesswoman and daughter of Carlos Ghosn
- Eileen Gu (born 2003), Chinese Olympic skier
- Olivia Hallisey, American scientist
- Lori Harvey (born 1997), model and adopted daughter of Steve Harvey
- Dree Hemingway (born 1987), American actress, model, and great-granddaughter of Ernest Hemingway
- Countess Lara Cosima Henckel von Donnersmarck (born 2003), German-American socialite, social media influencer, and daughter of Count Florian Henckel von Donnersmarck
- Angelina Jordan (born 2006), Norwegian singer
- Billie Lourd (born 1992), American actress and daughter of Carrie Fisher
- Lady Tatiana Mountbatten (born 1990), British equestrian and daughter of George Mountbatten, 4th Marquess of Milford Haven
- Atasha Muhlach (born 2001), Filipina actress and singer, daughter of actors Aga Muhlach and Charlene Gonzales
- Princess Eulalia d'Orléans Bourbon (born 2006), Spanish aristocrat and granddaughter of Infante Álvaro, Duke of Galliera
- India Oxenberg (born 1991), American actress, documentary film producer, and granddaughter of Princess Elizabeth of Yugoslavia
- Iman Perez (born 1999), French model, actress, and daughter of Vincent Perez
- Margaret Qualley (born 1994), American actress and daughter of Andie MacDowell
- Rainey Qualley (born 1989), American actress, singer, and daughter of Andie MacDowell
- Princess Mélusine Ruspoli (born 1994), Italian socialite, model, and daughter of Alessandro Ruspoli, 9th Prince of Cerveteri
- Lady Kitty Spencer (born 1990), British model, daughter of Charles Spencer, 9th Earl Spencer, niece of Diana, Princess of Wales
- Lady Araminta Spencer-Churchill (born 2007), British equestrian, daughter of James Spencer-Churchill, 12th Duke of Marlborough
- Lady Amelia Windsor (born 1995), British model and member of the British royal family

== Character ==
The ball introduces the world of high fashion to its invited debutantes, who are usually the daughters of well-known families. It can also be seen as an opportunity for fashion houses to achieve brand exposure.

The young women wear haute couture dresses by European designers and overseas fashion houses. They all wear jewelry from the same jeweler. Some couture houses have produced special ball gowns for the event. In 2003, Carolina Herrera made one for Diana Mellon, and in 2014, Danish designer Jesper Hovring made a dress for Viola Mikkelsen. In 2018, the Indo-French fashion house Lecoanet Hemant made a gown for Princess Ananya Raje Scindia of Gwalior. Jet Li's daughter Jane Li was dressed by Dior in 2019.

In 2008, French actor Jean Rochefort's daughter Clémence made her debut wearing a Nina Ricci ball gown. Anna Cleveland van Ravenstein, on the other hand, had been modeling for Chanel for years before "Uncle" Karl Lagerfeld helped her to pick out a vintage gown for le Bal.

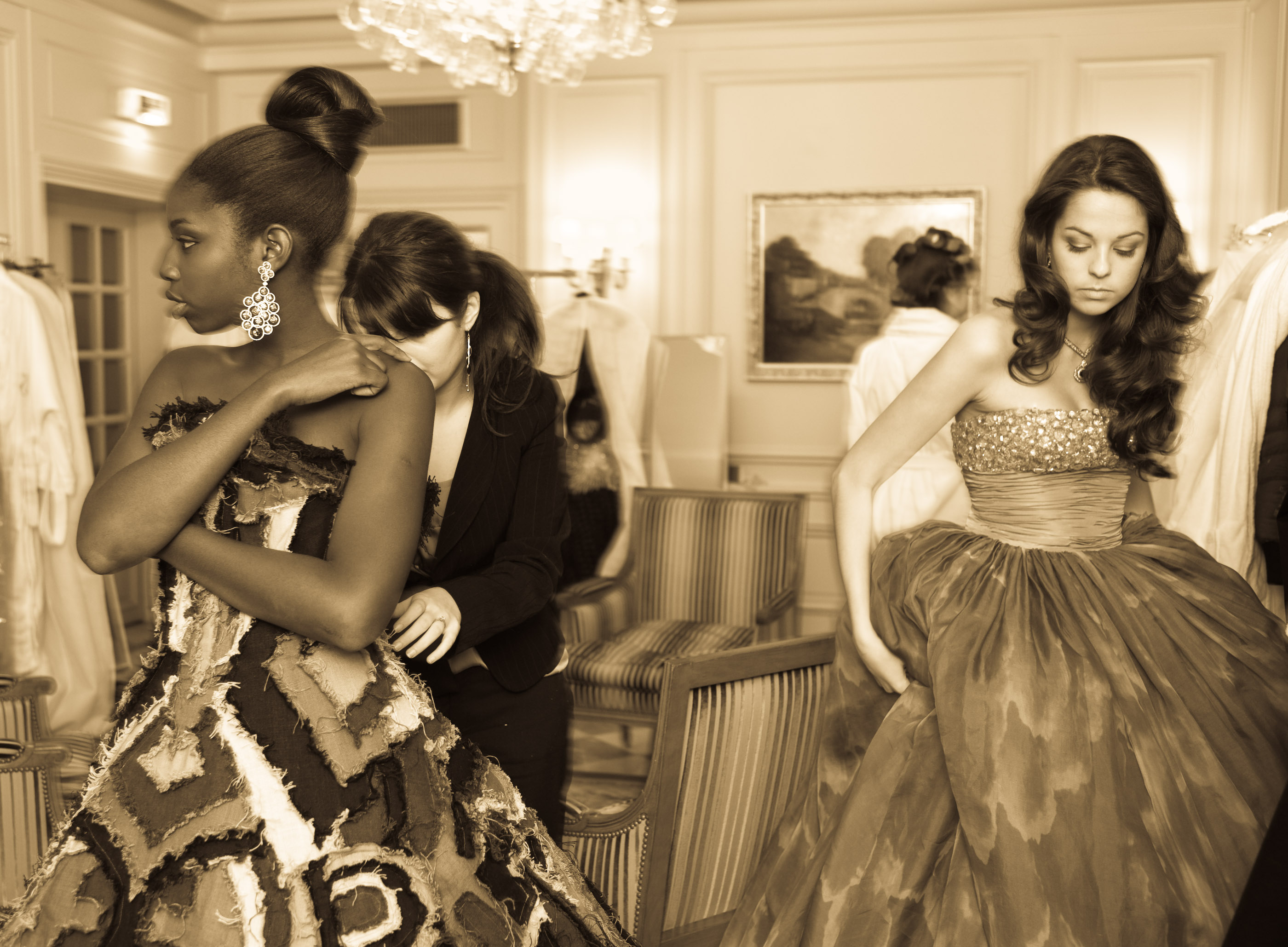
Sokhna N'dour and Anouchka Delon dressing for the ball in 2008

The ball takes place on a Saturday, but preparations include meeting the debutantes, their families and their cavaliers in advance.

On the eve of le Bal, a Friday, the debutantes come together for the first time. Makeup and hair styling sessions start at 9:00 am, with By Terry for makeup and with Alexandre de Paris for hair. After this, the debutantes put on their dresses, long gloves, shoes, and jewels, and there are individual and group photo sessions which last for the rest of the day. On Friday evening, the debutantes' fathers and cavaliers are offered a waltz class with two dance teachers.

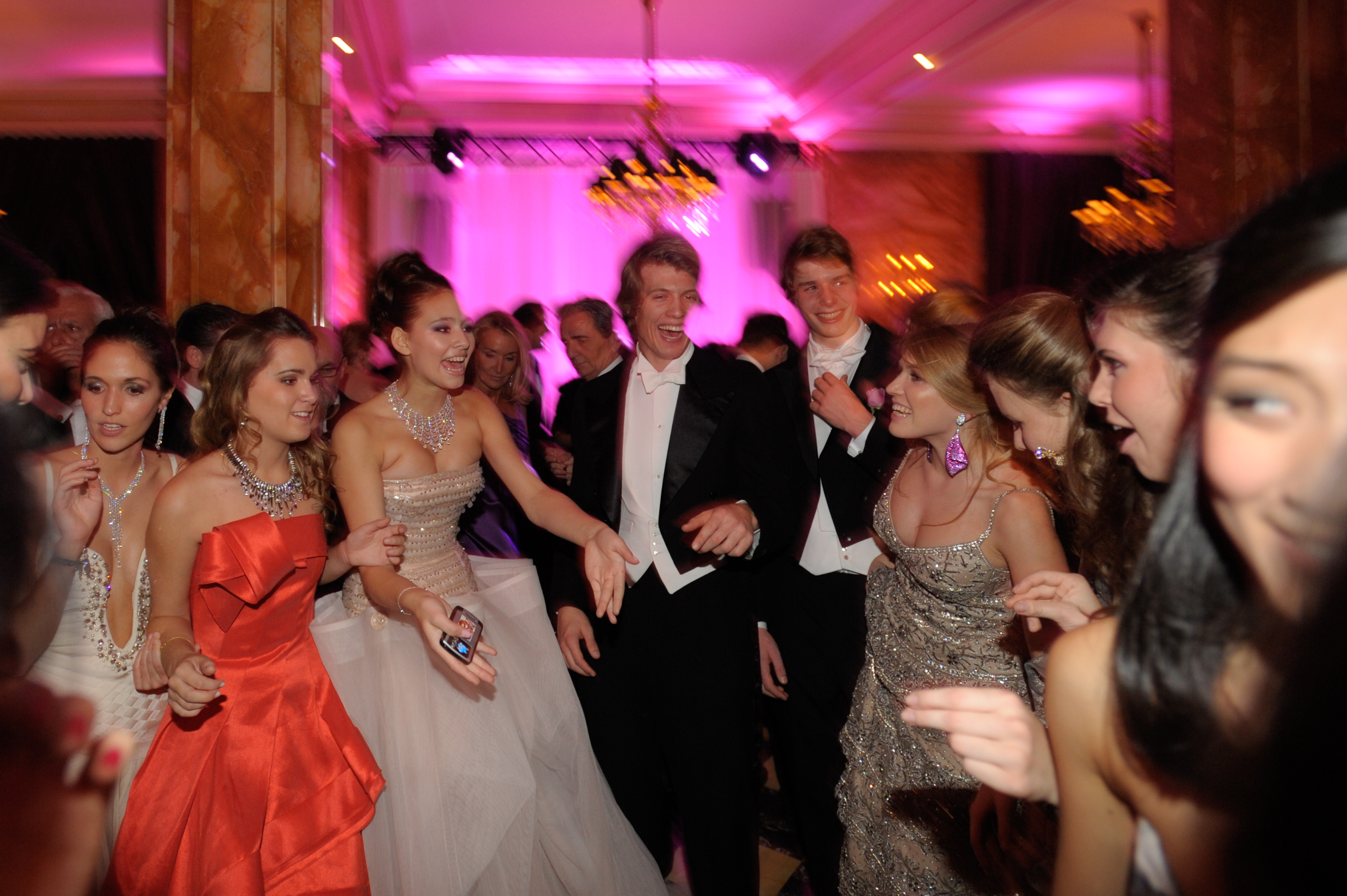
Debutantes at the 2009 ball at the Hôtel de Crillon

The debutantes are introduced in alphabetical order on the arms of their cavaliers by journalist and author Stéphane Bern. Then the dinner is served. After dinner, the debutantes who are the most followed by the media open le Bal, followed by all of the fathers with their daughters.

=== Opening dance ===
Each year since 2005, there has been a debutante who opens the dancing with a waltz.

- 2005: Bianca Brandolini d'Adda with the master of ceremony, Prince Charles-Philippe d'Orléans
- 2006: Xiaodan Chen with Stéphane Bern
- 2007: Maria Abou Nader with Stéphane Bern
- 2008: Bruce Willis and Alain Delon launched le Bal together, leading Scout Larue Willis in Lacroix Haute Couture and Anouchka Delon in Elie Saab Haute Couture, with the waltz from Luchino Visconti's film Il Gattopardo
- 2009: Autumn Whitaker with Forest Whitaker, and Jasmine Li with Stéphane Bern
- 2011: Tallulah Willis with Bruce Willis
- 2012: Sophia Rose Stallone in Elie Saab Haute Couture with Sylvester Stallone
- 2014: Princess Elizabeth of Bourbon-Parma in Alexis Mabille Haute Couture with Prince Charles-Emmanuel of Bourbon-Parma
- 2015: Iman Perez with Vincent Perez and Countess Gloria de Limburg-Stirum with Count Thierry de Limburg-Stirum
- 2016: Countess Angélique de Limburg-Stirum and her father Thierry de Limburg-Stirum opened the ball, followed by Yu Hang and Elle Beatty.
- 2017: Ava Philippe in Giambattista Valli haute couture danced with her escort, Maharaja Padmanabh Singh of Jaipur. The two danced to a song from the film La La Land.
- 2018: True Whitaker and her father Forest Whitaker opened le Bal, along with then Annabel Yao and her cavalier Jean de Croÿ-Solre and Gabrielle de Pourtalès and Stéphane Bern.
- 2019: French actor Jean-Paul Belmondo's daughter Stella Belmondo opened le Bal with Stéphane Bern, followed by Shanaya Kapoor and Iglesias twins Victoria and Cristina.
- 2022: The French Royal Princess Hélène of Orléans opened le Bal with her father the Duke of Chartres, followed by Wenhao Cai and her father the Chinese artist Cai Guo-Qiang and Leah Behn, the daughter of the Royal Princess Martha Louise of Norway, and Stéphane Bern.
- 2023: Countess Lara Cosima Henckel von Donnersmarck with her father, Count Florian Henckel von Donnersmarck

This opening dance is followed by a waltz with all of the fathers and debutantes. The fathers then cede their daughters to the cavaliers, and the waltz is replaced with contemporary music with a live band. The debs then return their dresses and their jewels. The debutantes and their cavaliers finish the evening out clubbing.
