= The Second Time (film) =

1995 film

- Directed by: Mimmo Calopresti
- Written by: Mimmo Calopresti; Francesco Bruni; Heidrun Schleef
- Based on: Colpo alla nuca by Sergio Lenci
- Produced by: Nella Banfi; Angelo Barbagallo; Nanni Moretti
- Starring: Francesca Antonelli
- Cinematography: Alessandro Pesci
- Edited by: Claudio Cormio
- Music by: Franco Piersanti
- Release date: 26 October 1995
- Running time: 80 minutes
- Country: Italy
- Language: Italian

The Second Time (Italian: La seconda volta) is a 1995 Italian drama film directed by Mimmo Calopresti. It was entered into the 1996 Cannes Film Festival.

== Cast ==
- Francesca Antonelli as Antonella
- Valeria Bruni Tedeschi as Lisa Venturi
- Simona Caramelli as Sonia
- Marina Confalone as Adele
- Roberto De Francesco as Enrico
- Orsetta De Rossi as Raffaella
- Paolo De Vita as Judge Di Biagio
- Nello Mascia as Doctor
- Valeria Milillo as Francesca
- Nanni Moretti as Alberto Sajevo
- Rossana Mortara as Student
- Antonio Petrocelli as Ronchi

== See also ==
- List of Italian films of 1995
