= Santo Subito! =

- Directed by: Bertrand Bonello
- Written by: Bertrand Bonello; Thomas Bidegain
- Produced by: Éric Altmayer; Bertrand Bonello; Daniel Campos Pavoncelli; Fabrizio Donvito; Benedetto Habib
- Starring: Mark Ruffalo; Charlotte Rampling; Andrzej Chyra; Cezary Żak; Marisa Borini; Adam Bessa; Anton Lesser
- Cinematography: Josée Deshaies
- Production companies: Mandarin & Compagnie; Indiana Production; Madants; Playtime; PiperFilm
- Countries: France; Italy; Poland
- Language: English

Santo Subito! is an upcoming historical thriller film directed by Bertrand Bonello and co-written by Thomas Bidegain. It stars Mark Ruffalo, Charlotte Rampling, Andrzej Chyra, Cezary Żak, Marisa Borini, Adam Bessa, and Anton Lesser.

== Cast ==
- Mark Ruffalo as Father Joseph Murolo
- Charlotte Rampling as Anna-Teresa Tymieniecka
- Andrzej Chyra as Pope John Paul II
- Cezary Żak as Stanisław Dziwisz
- Marisa Borini as Sofia Murolo
- Adam Bessa as Mehmet Ali Ağca
- Anton Lesser as Father Mattew
- Carsten Voigt as Pope Benedict XVI

== Production ==
In November 2024, director Bertrand Bonello revealed that he was working on his next feature film, which was titled Santo Subito!, which depicted the investigation of Pope John Paul II's path to sainthood. In November 2025, Mark Ruffalo joined in the lead role as Father Joseph Murolo. He was later joined by Charlotte Rampling as Polish-born American philosopher Anna-Teresa Tymieniecka, Andrzej Chyra as Pope John Paul, Cezary Żak as Stanisław Dziwisz, Adam Bessa as Mehmet Ali Ağca, alongside Anton Lesser and Marisa Borini in supporting roles.

Principal photography began on 3 March 2026, in Rome. Filming will also take place in Matera, Warsaw and Szczawnica.
