= Happiness Costs Nothing =

2003 film

- Directed by: Mimmo Calopresti
- Cinematography: Arnaldo Catinari
- Music by: Franco Piersanti
- Release date: 2003

Happiness Costs Nothing (Italian: La felicità non costa niente, French: La felicità, le bonheur ne coûte rien) is a 2003 Italian-French drama film directed by Mimmo Calopresti.

== Cast ==
- Mimmo Calopresti: Sergio
- Vincent Pérez: Francesco
- Valeria Bruni Tedeschi: Carla
- Francesca Neri: Sara
- Fabrizia Sacchi: Claudia
- Luisa De Santis: Lucia
- Peppe Servillo: Gianni
- Valeria Solarino: Alessia
- Laura Betti: Nun
