= Duse (film) =

Biographical film directed by Pietro Marcello

- Italian theatrical release poster
- Directed by: Pietro Marcello
- Written by: Pietro Marcello; Letizia Russo; Guido Silei
- Produced by: Benedetta Cappon; Carlo Degli Esposti; Marco Grifoni; Nicola Serra
- Starring: Valeria Bruni Tedeschi; Noémie Merlant; Mimmo Borrelli; Fausto Russo Alesi; Marcello Mazzarella
- Cinematography: Marco Graziaplena
- Edited by: Fabrizio Federico; Cristiano Travaglioli
- Music by: Fabrizio Elvetico; Marco Messina; Sacha Ricci
- Production companies: Palomar; Avventurosa; Ad Vitam; Rai Cinema; PiperFilm
- Distributed by: PiperFilm (Italy); Ad Vitam (France)
- Release dates: 3 September 2025 (Venice); 18 September 2025 (Italy); 14 January 2026 (France)
- Running time: 122 minutes
- Countries: Italy; France
- Language: Italian
- Budget: €7.6 million
- Box office: €1.2 million

Duse is a 2025 biographical drama film directed by Pietro Marcello, co-written by Marcello, Letizia Russo and Guido Silei. Starring Valeria Bruni Tedeschi in the titular role, it follows the life of Italian stage actress Eleonora Duse prior to the World War I, and the abrupt societal changes caused by the conflict.

The film had its world premiere in the main competition of the 82nd Venice International Film Festival on 3 September 2025, where it was nominated for the Golden Lion. It was theatrically released in Italy by PiperFilm on 18 September, and in France by Ad Vitam on 14 January 2026.

== Premise ==
In the wake of the First World War, former actress Eleonora Duse makes a return to the stage, contending with the limits of her own body as well as realities of power at odds with her utopian ideals.

== Cast ==
- Valeria Bruni Tedeschi as Eleonora Duse
- Noémie Merlant as Enrichetta Checchi, Duse's daughter
- Mimmo Borrelli as Ermete Zacconi
- Edoardo Sorgente as Giacomo Rossetti
- Fausto Russo Alesi as Gabriele D'Annunzio
- Marcello Mazzarella as Mariano Fortuny
- Fanni Wrochna as Désirée Von Wertheimstein
- Vincenzo Pirrotta as Benito Mussolini
- Noémie Lvovsky as Sarah Bernhardt
- Vincenzo Nemolato as Memo Benassi
- Federico Pacifici as Saturnino Ciarcelluti
- Vincenza Modica as Matilde Serao
- Savino Paparella as Luciano Nicastrelli
- Gaja Masciale as Cecilia Rinaldi
- Stefano Rosato

== Production ==
It was produced through Palomar, Avventurosa, Rai Cinema and PiperFilm. In co-production with Ad Vitam. In collaboration with Berta Film and Netflix. Supported by the Ministero della Cultura (MiC), Regione del Veneto, Veneto Film Commission, Regione Lazio and Creative Europe Media.

Principal photography began on 4 March 2024, shooting on location in Viterbo. Some scenes were filmed in Venice, in particular at the Teatro La Fenice. By May Variety reported that production was still underway.

Italian cinematographer Marco Graziaplena shot the film in Super16 and 35mm, using various cameras. Alongside Marcello's traditional use of archival footage.

The Match Factory opened Duse to international pre-sale at the Marché du Film during the 2024 Cannes Film Festival.

== Reception ==
=== Box office ===
It grossed $1.2 million in its theatrical release in Italy and France.

=== Critical responde ===
Damon Wise for Deadline writes that the film is "handsome but very culturally specific" and seems to contain an "unintentional streak of camp."

=== Accolades ===
| Award | Date of ceremony | Category | Recipient(s) | Result | Ref. |
|---|---|---|---|---|---|
| Venice International Film Festival | September 6, 2025 | Golden Lion | Pietro Marcello | Nominated | |

== See also ==
- Eleonora Duse, a 1947 Italian biographical film
