= Got to Believe season 2 =

Got to Believe
- Season 2
- No. of episodes: 33

Release
- Original network: ABS-CBN
- Original release: January 22 – March 7, 2014

Season chronology
- ← Previous; Season 1

second and final season of Got to Believe was aired in the Philippines on January 22, 2014 with the title, "The New Chapter". Same with season 1, each episode titles that appear at the intertitle were being used as official hashtags for the micro-blogging site Twitter.

Season 2 had some of its scenes filmed in Singapore and this was also weaved into the narrative of the series. Chichay, Joaquin, Alex and Juliana were seen around the country's famous places such as Merlion Park, The Helix Bridge, Marina Barrage, Gardens by the Bay, Haji Lane and Singapore Botanic Gardens.

Being the final season, the television series concluded on March 7, 2014 with the title "Best Ending Ever".

== Series overview and Ratings ==
Month	Episodes	Peak	Average Rating	Rank	Source
January 2014	8	33.4% (Episode 114)	25.5%	#5	
February 2014	20	33.1% (Episodes 131 and 132)	29.9%	#3	
March 2014	5	38.6% (Episode 140)	34.6%	#1	

== Episodes ==
=== January 2014 ===
No. in series	No. in season	Title	Rating	Original Air Date	Timeslot Rank	Whole Day Rank	Source
108	1	The New Chapter	25.4%	January 22, 2014	#1	#2	
Contrary to his initial plan of sending Joaquin abroad, Dr. Alferos decides to take out the bullet from Joaquin's head immediately after the boy's car accident. While the operation puts Joaquin's life in jeopardy, the extracted bullet reveals the truth about Chito's alleged shooting of Joaquin. Two years later, Chichay gets a shot at changing the Tampipis' measly living with the help of an art curator in Singapore. Unaware of what happened to Joaquin after his brain surgery, Chichay sees someone who resembles Joaquin in Singapore.
109	2	Hey, It's Me	29.3%	January 23, 2014	#1	#2	
Just when she thought that she is just seeing things, Chichay finds herself face to face with Joaquin in Singapore. Much to her dismay, however, Joaquin does not acknowledge who she is and instead hugs another girl who calls him Ryan. To make matters worse, Joaquin asks the new girl to be his girlfriend right in front of Chichay.
110	3	Let The Pain Remain	28.8%	January 24, 2014	#1	#2	
A minor accident brings Chichay to a hospital where she discovers the truth behind Joaquin's inability to recognize her. Now aware of Joaquin's amnesia and his new life as Ryan, Chichay resists the temptation to remind him about their old flame. A day before Chichay's flight to Manila, Ryan personally asks Chichay to make a painting for Alex, his girlfriend, who happens to be a big fan of Chichay's art genius.
111	4	Parting Time	29.8%	January 27, 2014	#1	#3	
Chichay fails to make Joaquin remember anything about her and takes it as a sign to move on with her life without him. She returns to the Philippines and starts a new life with her family. However, Ronaldo passes away, and Ryan's insistence to be at his grandfather's funeral leaves Juliana and Jaime no choice but to ensure that their son will not remember anything during his stay in the Philippines.
112	5	Again	28.4%	January 28, 2014	#1	#3	
Just when Chichay has resolved to forget about her and Joaquin, Ryan develops the desire to remember the past following his encounter with Kit at Ronaldo's funeral. Soon, Juliana finds herself cornered when Ryan bargains for a one-month stay in the Philippines and she has no concrete reason for declining his request.
113	6	Take A Chance Again	29.6%	January 29, 2014	#1	#3	
Chichay's emerging reputation in fine arts attracts community developers into hiring Chichay for their beautification projects. Consequently, Juliana's conscious efforts to keep Ryan away from Chichay get wasted when Ryan himself employs Chichay to decorate Zuri, East Horizon's flagship community in Laguna. Meanwhile, Alex's father demands that she return to Paris. Elsewhere, Chito and Betchay find the need to discuss with Juliana her ongoing lawsuit against Chito.
114	7	The Last Time I Felt Like This	33.4%	January 30, 2014	#1	#3	
Respecting Ryan's girlfriend, Chichay decides not to revive even her friendship with Joaquin. Unbeknownst to Chichay, Alex herself instructs Ryan to befriend the famous Cristina. Subsequently, the more Chichay avoids Ryan, the more Ryan finds ways to get closer with her. Soon, Chichay finds her and Ryan inadvertently reliving some of their special moments in the past. Meanwhile, Juliana agrees to drop her lawsuit against Chito on the condition that no Tampipi will come near any San Juan ever again. Chito and Betchay accept Juliana's terms without telling Chichay about it.
115	8	The Heart Never Forgets	26.9%	January 31, 2014	#1	#3	
Despite Chichay's objections, Ryan accompanies Chichay on her way home. When they reach Patricia's house, however, Patricia warns Chichay that Didith and her friends are within the vicinity lying in wait for her and Joaquin. Chichay is left with no choice but to return to Zuri with Ryan. Soon, the walls Chichay put up against Ryan gradually crumble when Chichay realizes that Ryan is still the same Joaquin who longs for a friend he could trust and do silly things with.
5th most watched program in January 2014 with 25.5% average rating.

=== February 2014 ===
No. in series	No. in season	Title	Rating	Original Air Date	Timeslot Rank	Whole Day Rank	Source
116	9	Back At One	29.7%	February 3, 2014	#1	#3	
Ryan feels happy for finally being able to form a friendship with Chichay and for spending a simple dinner with her. Chichay, on the other hand, finds the need to leave right away as she discovers that Ryan, Ethel, and Tarantina are residing at the next unit. However, Tarantina's persistence to know Cristina's identity puts Chichay in great trouble.
117	10	So Close	30.8%	February 4, 2014	#1	#2	
Forced into a confrontation, Chichay explains to Tarantina what she was doing in Joaquin's house. As Chichay emphasizes the purpose of her visit, she assures Tarantina that she has no intention of reminding Joaquin of his troubled past. Despite Chichay's assurance, Tarantina keeps a watchful eye. Meanwhile, Betchay and Chito enjoy the royal treatment after Tessa invites them as special guests for a grand event.
118	11	Confused	29.1%	February 5, 2014	#1	#3	
After spending a whole day with Chichay, Ryan confronts himself and begins to deliberate if he has feelings for her. He unintentionally misses Alex's urgent call as he spends time in his introspection. Meanwhile, Chichay goes to Tessa's grand party upon Betchay's request. During the party, she unwillingly becomes the subject of Didith's interrogation.
119	12	Chasing Pavements	31.1%	February 6, 2014	#1	#2	
Alex becomes exceedingly fond of Chichay after Ryan finally introduces them to each other. As a sign of her growing affection, Alex cooks lunch for Chichay. Alex's gesture forces Chichay to spend more time with Ryan.
120	13	I’ll Be Alright	29.9%	February 7, 2014	#1	#3	
Heartaches Chichay has desperately tried to bury resurface as she watches Alex take care of Ryan. Things get even more complicated for Chichay when she learns that Juliana is coming over for a visit.
121	14	I’ll Never Get Over You	29.2%	February 10, 2014	#1	#3	
Though Jaime and Juliana persist in keeping Ryan from the reach of the people in his past, Kit and his friends find them and uncover the truth behind Joaquin's absence and Joaquin's alleged reconciliation with Chichay. Chichay, on the other hand, finds herself in serious trouble once again when Jaime and Juliana learn that a certain Cristina Tampipi is working for Ryan. Ethel tries to help Chichay out but Jaime sees her with his own eyes.
122	15	I Still Believe In Loving You	30.8%	February 11, 2014	#1	#2	
Much to Chichay's relief, Jaime pretends that he has not seen her but asks Chichay to stay away from Ryan as soon as her contract ends. After Patricia asked for his help, Pedro goes to Laguna and helps Chichay finish the mural so they can leave at the soonest possible time. Meanwhile, Alex begins to feel suspicious about Ryan's feelings for Cristina as she notices her boyfriend's discomfort while looking at Chichay and Pedro's sweet gestures toward each other.
123	16	I Don’t Want You To Go	26.6%	February 12, 2014	#1	#4	
Ryan's unpredictable mood puts a strain on his relationship with Alex. Things escalate when Ryan finally admits to Alex that he is attracted to Chichay. Meanwhile, gloom starts to creep over Chichay after she finishes her project with Ryan, marking the end of their short reunion.
124	17	Chances Are	29.7%	February 13, 2014	#1	#3	
Despite her best efforts to put the past behind, Chichay finds herself crossing paths with Ryan and Alex. Powerless against the will of fate, the three are forced to confront their own insecurities and fears.
125	18	Lost Without Your Love	28.0%	February 14, 2014	#1	#3	
Things become more complicated as Ryan's fondness for Chichay continues to grow despite being clueless about their past. Wanting to save Alex from further hurt, Ryan decides to end their relationship. Meanwhile, Chichay opts to stay away from Ryan to save her and her family from another conflict with the Manansalas.
126	19	Love Will Lead You Back	31.4%	February 17, 2014	#1	#2	
127	20	Somewhere In My Past	30.5%	February 18, 2014	#1	#2	
128	21	If You Only Knew	28.1%	February 19, 2014	#1	#3	
129	22	So Many Questions	31.2%	February 20, 2014	#1	#2	
130	23	Remember Me	29.5%	February 21, 2014	#1	#3	
131	24	I Need You Back	33.1%	February 24, 2014	#1	#2	
132	25	My Love Is Here To Stay	33.1%	February 25, 2014	#1	#2	
133	26	Only Me And You	27.3%	February 26, 2014	#1	#2	
134	27	Way Back Into Love	29.4%	February 27, 2014	#1	#2	
135	28	Where Does My Heart Beat Now	30.1%	February 28, 2014	#1	#2	
3rd most watched program in February 2014 with 29.9% average rating.

=== March 2014 ===
No. in series	No. in season	Title	Rating	Original Air Date	Timeslot Rank	Whole Day Rank	Source
136	29	Last 5 Nights	31.3%	March 3, 2014	#1	#2	
137	30	Last 4 Nights	32.7%	March 4, 2014	#1	#2	
138	31	Last 3 Nights	34.2%	March 5, 2014	#1	#1	
139	32	Last 2 Nights	35.0%	March 6, 2014	#1	#1	
140	33	Best Ending Ever	38.6%	March 7, 2014	#1	#1	
Most watched program in March 2014 with 34.6% average rating.
