= The Summer House =

- Les Estivants
- Directed by: Valeria Bruni Tedeschi
- Written by: Noémie Lvovsky; Agnès de Sacy; Valeria Bruni Tedeschi
- Produced by: Alexandra Henochsberg; Patrick Sobelman; Angelo Barbagallo
- Starring: Valeria Bruni Tedeschi; Pierre Arditi; Valeria Golino; Noémie Lvovsky; Yolande Moreau; Laurent Stocker; Riccardo Scamarcio; Bruno Raffaelli
- Cinematography: Jeanne Lapoirie
- Edited by: Anne Weil
- Music by: Paolo Buonvino
- Production companies: Ad Vitam Production; Ex Nihilo
- Distributed by: Ad Vitam Distribution
- Release dates: 5 September 2018 (Venice); 30 January 2019
- Running time: 127 min
- Countries: France; Italy
- Language: French
- Budget: $6.2 million
- Box office: $1.4 million

Les Estivants (transl. The Summer House) is a French drama film directed by Valeria Bruni Tedeschi. It premiered at the 75th Venice International Film Festival.

== Plot ==
Anna, a recently separated film director, goes with her daughter to her mother's large and beautiful property on the French Riviera for a few days vacation. In the midst of her family, friends, and employees, Anna must manage both her break-up and the writing of her new film. She will not necessarily be listened to and helped.

== Cast ==
- Valeria Bruni Tedeschi as Anna
- Pierre Arditi as Jean
- Valeria Golino as Elena
- Noémie Lvovsky as Nathalie
- Yolande Moreau as Jacqueline
- Laurent Stocker as Stanislas
- Riccardo Scamarcio as Luca
- Bruno Raffaelli as Bruno
- Marisa Borini as Louisa
- Oumy Bruni Garrel as Célia
- Guilaine Londez as Pauline
- Vincent Perez as The Swiss actor
- Stefano Cassetti as The brother of Anna
- Xavier Beauvois as The producer
- Frederick Wiseman as CNC Member

== Production ==
Principal photography on the film began in August 2017 in Paris.

== Year-end lists ==
- Best "sleepers" (not ranked) – Dennis King, Tulsa World
