= Olivia Hallisey =

American scientist

- Education: Stanford University
- Occupations: Student, Scientist

Olivia Hallisey is an American scientist at Stanford University.

Previously, she attended Greenwich High School in Greenwich, Connecticut. While a junior in high school, she won first prize in the 2015 Google Science Fair for inventing a low-cost, rapid test for Ebola. The prize also came with $50,000. According to Hallisey, her test can be completed in as little as 30 minutes at a cost of $25, and, unlike existing ebola detection methods, does not require refrigeration. She became interested in fighting Ebola while watching the 2014 West Africa Ebola outbreak in which thousands of people died.

== Personal life ==
In 2016, she was presented as a debutante at the prestigious Le Bal des débutantes in Paris.
