= Vincent Perez =

Swiss actor, director and photographer (born 1964)

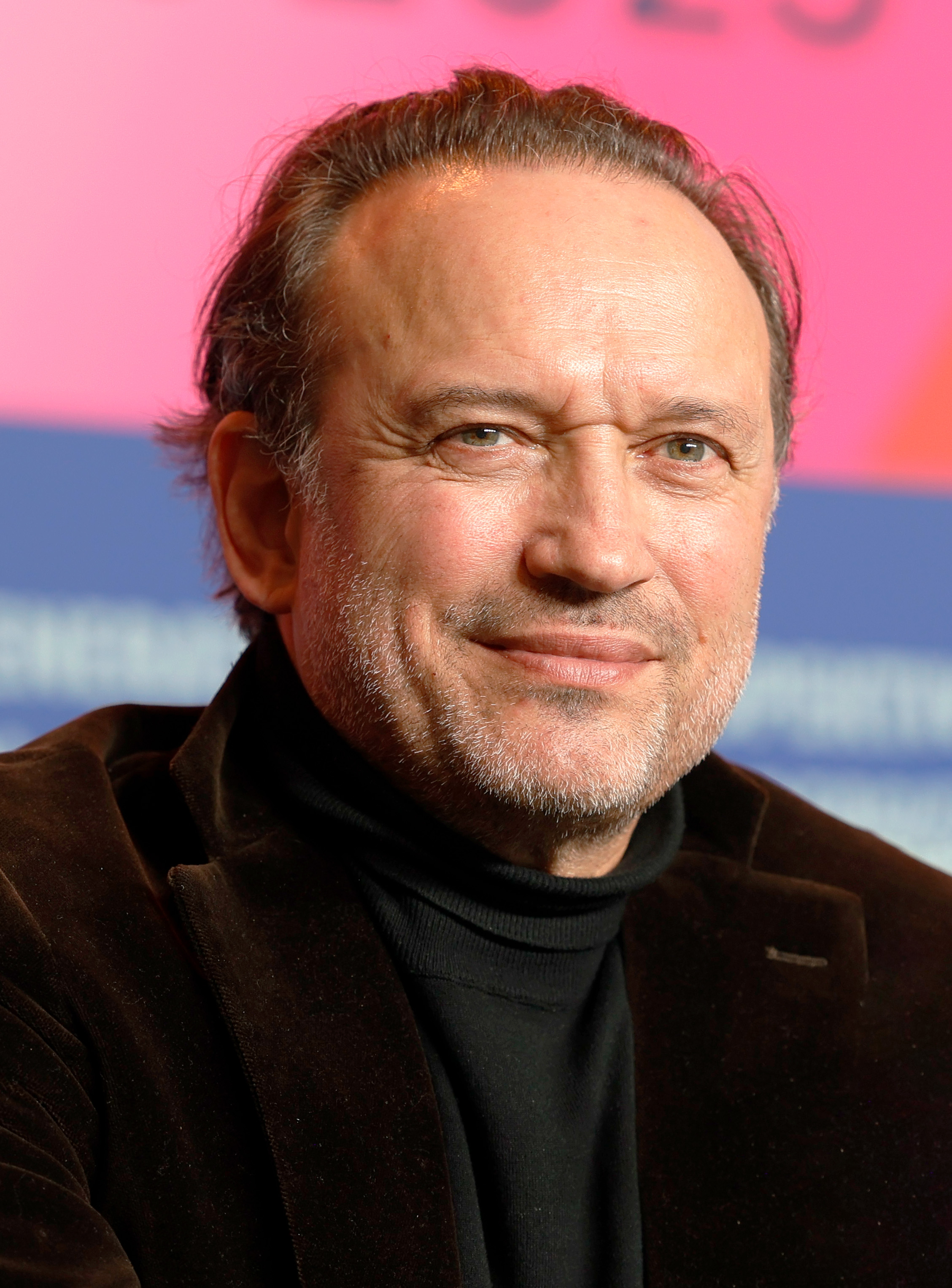
- Perez in 2025
- Born: 10 June 1964 (age 61); Lausanne, Vaud, Switzerland
- Occupations: Actor, director, photographer
- Years active: 1986–present
- Spouse: Karine Silla (m. 1998)
- Children: 3; including Iman

Vincent Perez (born 10 June 1964) is a Swiss actor, director and photographer. He played the title character, Ashe Corven, in The Crow: City of Angels, and starred in Queen of the Damned, playing Marius de Romanus. Some of his films in French cinema include Cyrano de Bergerac, Le Bossu, La Reine Margot and Indochine.

== Early life ==
Perez was born on 10 June 1964 in Lausanne, Switzerland, to a Spanish father and a German mother. His mother was a housewife and his father worked in the import-export business. He commenced acting studies in Geneva, followed by the CNSAD and completed his training at the school of the Théâtre Nanterre-Amandiers. He started acting in theatre before starring in films.

== Career ==
=== Cinema ===
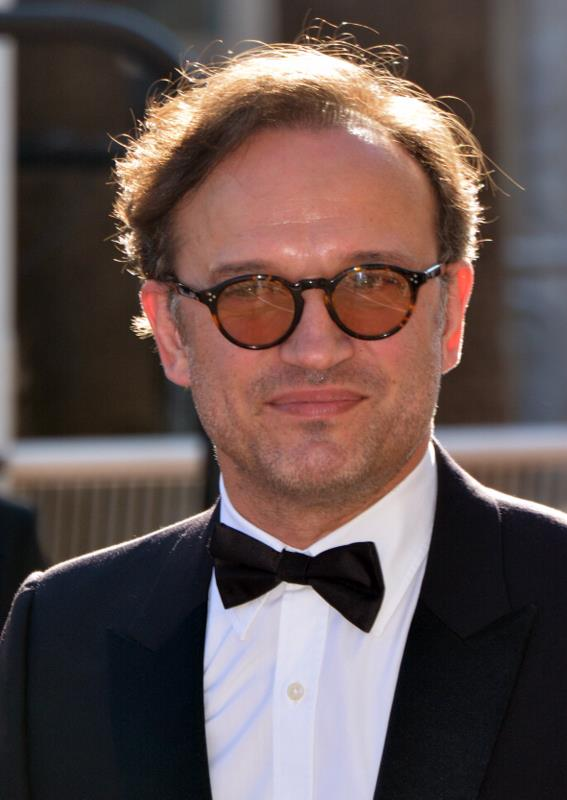
Perez at the 2017 Cannes Film Festival

His breakthrough role was starring as Christian opposite Gérard Depardieu in Cyrano de Bergerac. He was nominated for a César Award. He has since appeared in various films and his onscreen leading ladies have included Catherine Deneuve, Kim Basinger, Isabelle Adjani and Aaliyah.

On television, he starred in Paris enquêtes criminelles, the French remake of Law & Order: Criminal Intent. Perez starred as Lieutenant Vincent Revel. He also portrayed Frankenstein's monster in a 2004 television movie titled Frankenstein starring Parker Posey in an update of Mary Shelley's 1818 novel Frankenstein.

He has also gone into directing. Two of his shorts, L'échange and Rien à dire, have been nominated for the Palme d'Or at the Cannes Film Festival.

=== Photography ===
He has exhibited his photographic work during festivals and in art galleries. For example, his exhibition entitled Face to Face, which featured photographs of Carla Bruni, Johnny Hallyday and Gérard Depardieu, was unveiled at Rencontres d'Arles, an annual photography festival in Arles, France. In December 2012, he exhibited his photographs of dancers of the Bolshoi Ballet at the RuArts in Moscow, Russia. Two years later, in December 2014, he exhibited them again at the Accademia Fine Art Gallery in Monte Carlo, Monaco.

== Personal life ==
He is married to French actress Karine Silla, ex-partner of Gérard Depardieu and sister of French producer Virginie Besson-Silla. Perez and Silla have three children together, including model Iman Perez. From 1988 to 1992, Perez was romantically involved with British actress Jacqueline Bisset, who is twenty years his senior.

== Work ==
=== Filmography ===
Year	Title	Role	Language	Notes
1986	Gardien de la nuit (Guardian of the Night)	Armand	French	
1987	Hôtel de France	Serge	French	
1988	La Maison de jade (The House of Jade)	Bernard Gretz	French	
1990	Cyrano de Bergerac	Christian de Neuvillette	French	César Award Nominee for Most Promising Actor (Meilleur espoir masculin)
1990	Il viaggio di Capitan Fracassa (Captain Fracassa's Journey)	Baron of Sigognac	Italian	
1991	La Neige et le feu	Jacques Sénéchal	French	
1992	Cendre d'or		French	Short film
1992	Indochine (Indochina)	Jean-Baptiste	French	
1992	L'Échange	—	French	Cannes Film Festival Golden Palm Award Nominee for Best Short Film; Short written and directed by Vincent Perez
1993	Fanfan	Alexandre	French	
1994	La Reine Margot (Queen Margot)	La Môle	French	
1995	Al di là delle nuvole (Beyond the Clouds)	Niccolo		
1996	Ligne de vie (Линия жизни, Lifeline)	Philippe	Russian	
1996	The Crow: City of Angels	Ashe Corven/The Crow	English	
1997	Swept from the Sea	Yanko Gooral	English	
1997	Le bossu (On Guard)	Duc de Nevers	French	César Award Nominee for Best Supporting Actor (Meilleur second rôle masculin); Cabourg Romantic Film Festival Award for Best Actor
1998	Ceux qui m'aiment prendront le train (Those Who Love Me Can Take the Train)	Viviane	French	César Award Nominee for Best Supporting Actor (Meilleur second rôle masculin)
1998	The Treat	Pierre	English	
1998	Talk of Angels	Francisco Areavaga	English	
1998	Shot Through the Heart	Slavko Stanic	English	TV film
1999	Le Temps retrouvé (Time Regained)	Morel	French	
1999	Rien à dire	—	French	Cannes Film Festival Golden Palm Award Nominee for Best Short Film; Short directed by Vincent Perez
2000	Épouse-moi (Marry Me)	Hadrien Roche	French	
2000	Le Libertin (The Libertine)	Denis Diderot	French	
2000	I Dreamed of Africa	Paolo Gallmann	English	
2001	Les Morsures de l'aube (Love Bites)	Young actor	French	
2001	Bride of the Wind	Oskar Kokoschka	English	
2002	Queen of the Damned	Marius de Romanus	English	
2002	Peau d'Ange (Once Upon An Angel)	—	French	Written and directed by Vincent Perez; Nominated—Montreal World Film Festival Grand Prix des Amériques
2003	Le pharmacien de garde (The Pharmacist)	Yan Lazarrec	French	
2003	La felicità non-costa niente (Happiness Costs Nothing)	Francesco	Italian	
2003	Fanfan la Tulipe	Fanfan la Tulipe	French	
2003	I'm Staying!	Bertrand Delpire	French	
2004	Bienvenue en Suisse (Welcome to Switzerland)	Aloïs Couchepin	French	
2004	Nouvelle-France (Battle of the Brave)	Intendant le Bigot	English	
2007	The Apocalypse Code	Lui	Russian	MTV Movie Award (Russia) Nominee for Best Fight; shared with Anastasiya Zavorotnyuk; Credited as Vensan Peres
2007	Arn – Tempelriddaren (Arn – The Knight Templar)	Brother Guilbert	Swedish	
2007	The Secret	—	English	Produced and directed by Vincent Perez
2009	Demain dès l'aube (Tomorrow at Dawn)	Mathieu	French	
2010	Inhale	Dr. Martinez	English	
2010	Bruc	Maraval	Catalan	
2012	Lines of Wellington	Lévêque	Portuguese	
2012	Ce que le jour doit à la nuit (What the Day Owes the Night)	Juan Rucilio	French	
2013	Puppylove	Christian	French	
2014	The Kitchen in Paris (Cuisine in Paris)	Nicolas DuPont	Russian	
2016	Alone in Berlin	—	English	Director, writer
2017	Dalida	Eddie Barclay	French	
2017	Chacun sa vie et son intime conviction (Everyone's Life)	The Count	French	
2017	Hochelaga, Land of Souls	Jacques Cartier		
2018	Territory of Love	Professor Deglacière	French	
2018	L'intervention	General Favrart	French	
2018	At Eternity's Gate	The Director	English	
2018	Ladies in Black	Stefan	English	
2018	The Summer House	The Swiss actor	French	
2019	The Aeronauts	Pierre Rennes	English	
2023	The Edge of the Blade	Colonel Louis Berchère	French	Also director, writer
2025	Hot Milk	Gomez	English	

=== Television ===
Year	Title	Role	Language	Notes
1986	Série noire	Yvon	French	1 episode: Piège à flics
1990	Hamlet	Laerte	French	
1998	Shot Through the Heart	Slavko	English	
2000	Scénarios sur la drogue	—	French	Directed 1 episode, Scénarios sur la drogue
2004	Frankenstein	Deucalion	English	
2005	Le juge	Marc Steiner	French	
2006	Avec le temps...	Philippe Julliart	French	
2006	Jeanne Poisson, Marquise de Pompadour	Louis XV	French	
2007	Paris enquêtes criminelles (Law & Order: Paris)	Vincent Revel	French	20 episodes
2008	Avalanche	Marc	German	
2010	Lo scandalo della Banca Romana	Clemente Claudet	Italian	
2010	Trahie!	Paul/Antonio	French	
2022	Shantaram	Didier Levy	English	An Apple TV+ Original
2025	Hostage	Elias Vernier	English	Netflix miniseries

== Awards and nominations ==
=== César Awards ===
Year	Award	Film	Result
1991	Most Promising Actor (Meilleur jeune espoir masculin)	Cyrano de Bergerac	Nominated
1998	Best Supporting Actor (Meilleur second rôle masculin)	Le bossu	Nominated
1998	Best Supporting Actor (Meilleur second rôle masculin)	Ceux qui m'aiment prendront le train	Nominated

=== Palme d'Or ===
Year	Award	Film	Result
1992	Best Short Film	L'échange	Nominated
1999	Best Short Film	Rien à dire	Nominated

=== Montréal World Film Festival ===
Year	Award	Film	Result
2002	Grand Prix des Amériques	Peau d'ange	Nominated

=== MTV Movie Awards Russia ===
Year	Award	Film	Result
2008	Best Fight	Kod apokalipsisa	Nominated

=== Cabourg Film Festival ===
Year	Award	Film	Result
1992	Prix Jean Gabin		Won
2008	Best Actor	Le bossu	Won
