= Mimmo Calopresti =

Italian film director

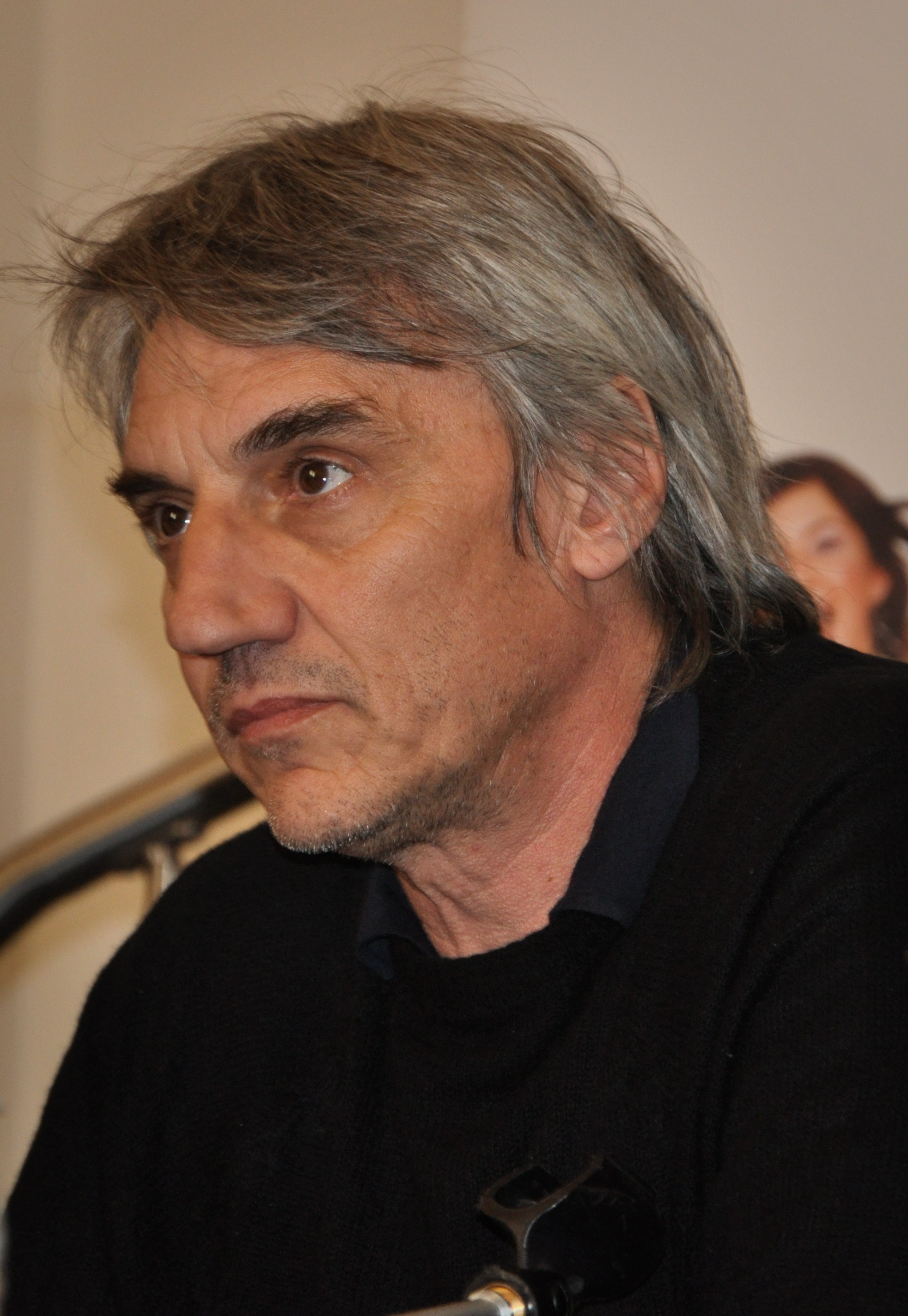
- Born: 4 January 1955 (age 71); Polistena, Calabria, Italy
- Occupations: Film director, screenwriter
- Years active: 1987-present

Mimmo Calopresti (born 4 January 1955 in Polistena, Calabria) is an Italian film director, screenwriter, producer and actor. He has directed 16 films since 1987. His film The Second Time was entered into the 1996 Cannes Film Festival.

== Selected filmography ==
- The Second Time (1995)
- Notes of Love (1998)
- I Prefer the Sound of the Sea (2000)
- Happiness Costs Nothing (2003)
