= Hydrium =

Hydrium may refer to several things:

- Hydrogen, hydrium is a former name for hydrogen.
- Hydrium, a fictitious element in Kenneth Oppel's Matt Cruse novels, Airborn, Skybreaker, and Starclimber

== See also ==
- Protium (disambiguation)
- Hydride
- Hydronium
- Hydron (disambiguation)
- Hydroxonium
