= Silverwing =

Silverwing or Silver Wing may refer to:

- Silverwing (novel), a 1997 children's novel by Kenneth Oppel; the first in the Silverwing series
  - Silverwing (TV series), a 2003 animated TV series based on the first book in the novel series
- "Silverwing", a song by Arch Enemy from Burning Bridges
- Silverwing, one of the dragons named in the A Song of Ice and Fire books by George R. R. Martin
- Silver Wing Medal, a Philippine military decoration
- Silver Wing Service, a luxury air service offered by Imperial Airways
- Honda Silver Wing (disambiguation), a line of motorcycles and scooters

== See also ==
- Silver Wings (disambiguation)
