= Anoushka (given name) =

The names Anoushka, Anouska, Anuschka, Anushka and Annushka are diminutive forms of the female given name Anna, derived from the Russian diminutive Аннушка. Anoushka (انوشکا) also means "grace" or "a favour" or "a flower" in Persian. It also occurs as a Hindi and Sinhalese name, sometimes popularly reanalysed as having a Sanskrit derivation, but may simply be influenced by the Russian name. Notable people with the name include:

== Anoushka ==
- Anoushka (Egyptian singer) (born 1960), stage name of Egyptian singer Wartanoush Garbis Selim
- Anoushka Lucas (born 1987), English singer, composer, actress and playwright
- Anoushka Parikh (born 1997), Indian badminton player
- Anoushka Shankar (born 1981), Indian American sitar player and composer
- Anoushka Sabnis (born 2007), Indian author and poet
- Anoushka Schut-Welkzijn (born 1969), Dutch politician

== Anouska ==
- Anouska Golebiewski, participant in season 4 of Big Brother
- Anouska Hempel (born 1941), sometimes Anoushka Hempel, New Zealand actress, hotelier and designer
- Anouska Koster (born 1993), Dutch racing cyclist
- Anouska van der Zee (born 1976), Dutch racing cyclist

== Anousjka ==
- Anousjka van Exel (born 1974), Dutch tennis player

== Anuschka ==
- Anuschka Gläser (born 1969), German former pair skater
- Anuschka Tischer (born 1968), German historian

== Anushka ==
- Anushka Asthana (born 1980), Indian-British journalist
- Anushka Jasraj, Indian fiction writer
- Anushka Manchanda (born 1984), Indian singer
- Anushka Naiknaware (born 2003), Indian-American inventor, scientist and speaker
- Anushka Patel, Australian scientist and cardiologist
- Anushka Perera (born 1993), Sri Lankan cricketer
- Anushka Polonowita (born 1977), Sri Lankan cricketer
- Anushka Ranjan (born 1990), Indian film actress and model
- Anushka Rajapaksha, Sri Lankan scientist
- Anushka Ravishankar, Indian author of children's books, and co-founder of Duckbill Books, a publishing house
- Anushka Sanjeewani (born 1990), Sri Lankan cricketer
- Anushka Sen (born 2002), Indian model and television actress
- Anushka Shahaney also known as Anushqa, Indian singer and songwriter
- Anushka Sharma (born 1988), Indian actress
- Anushka Shetty (born 1981), South Indian actress
- Anushka Shrestha (born 1995), Nepalese beauty pageant winner
- Anushka Singh (born 1964), Indian model and actress

== See also ==
- Anoushka (disambiguation)
- Anoushka (disambiguation)
