= Shree (disambiguation) =

Shree may refer to:

- Shri, an honorific commonly used in the Indian subcontinent
- Shree (Hindustani raga), the Hindustani classical music scale
- Shree (Carnatic raga), the Carnatic music scale
- Sri (Odissi raga), the Odissi classical music scale
- Shree (2013 film), a Hindi film starring Hussain Kuwajerwala, Paresh Ganatra and Anjali Patil
- Shree (TV series), a Hindi supernatural soap opera
- Shri, another name for the Hindu goddess Lakshmi

== People ==
- Shree Bose, an American scientist, winner of the inaugural Google Science Fair

== See also ==
- Sri (disambiguation)
- Sree (film), a 2005 Indian film by Dasaradh
