= SRI =

Sri, SRI, or variations thereof, may refer to:

== Sri ==
Sri, Shri, or Sree may refer to:

=== People and religious figures ===
- Dewi Sri, ancient Javanese and Balinese goddess
- Lakshmi, the Hindu goddess of wealth
- Shri (musician) or Shrikanth Sriram, Indian-born composer, multi-instrumentalist, and producer in the UK
- Sri or Sri Sri, a Hindu honorific
- Sri (actor), Indian film actor
- Sri Lintang (born 2000), Indonesian singer and former member of the idol group JKT48
- Sri Kommineni, South Indian music director
- Sri Mulyani Indrawati (born 1962), Indonesian economist
- Sri Sri (writer) or Srirangam Srinivasarao (1910–1983), Indian Telugu-language poet and lyricist
- Jonathan Sriranganathan (formerly Sri), Australian activist and politician

=== Movies ===
- Sri (1999 film), Indonesia
- Sri (2002 film), Indian Tamil film
- Sree (film), Indian Telugu film

=== Other uses ===
- Shree ragam, a Carnatic musical scale
- Shri (genus), a genus of dromaeosaurid dinosaur

== SRI ==
SRI or similar may refer to:

=== Places and transportation ===
- Sacrum Romanum Imperium, the former Holy Roman Empire
- Samarinda or Temindung Airport, former IATA code
- The Steam Railroading Institute, Owosso, MI, US
- SRi, a car model used for several General Motors vehicles
- Sri Lanka, a country in South Asia, by IOC country code

=== Science and technology ===
- Serotonin reuptake inhibitor
- Solar reflectance index (of a roof) — see Reflective surfaces (climate engineering) § Properties
- SRI (gene)
- SRI International, formerly Stanford Research Institute
- Subresource Integrity of a website
- Sumitomo Rubber Industries, a global tire and rubber company
- Sunnybrook Research Institute in health sciences, Toronto, Canada
- System of Rice Intensification, to increase yield
- GEMS School of Research and Innovation
- Schwartz Reisman Institute, a research centre at the University of Toronto

=== Other uses ===
- Selection Research, Inc., acquired by the Gallup Organization in 1988
- Serikat Rakyat Independen, Union of (Indonesian) Independent People Party
- Serviciul Român de Informaţii, the Romanian domestic intelligence service
- Siena Research Institute, a public opinion research company in the US
- Socially responsible investing
- Socorro Rojo Internacional, a communist social welfare organization in Spain
- Swiss Radio International (1935–2004), the international radio station of Switzerland
- Sarekat Rakjat Indonesia, former Surinamese political party, of which Frits Karsowidjojo was a member

== See also ==
- Sri Sri (disambiguation)
- Shree (disambiguation)
- Thiru (disambiguation)
- Tiru (disambiguation)
- Selective serotonin reuptake inhibitor (SSRI)
- SRIS
