= Tiru =

Tiru may refer to:

== People ==
- Bogdan Țîru (born 1994), Romanian football player
- Märt Tiru (1947–2005), Estonian military officer
- Stephen M. Tiru (1937–2012), Roman Catholic bishop
- Toomas Tiru (born 1969), Estonian skier

== Places ==
- Tiru Dam, dam in Udgir, Maharashtra, India

== Other ==
- Tiru also Thiru, a Tamil honorific, which is a variant of the Sanskrit Shri
- Thiru (director), Indian film director
- USS Tiru (SS-416)

== See also ==
- Thiru (disambiguation)
- Shri (disambiguation)
