= Hydron (disambiguation) =

A hydron is a hydrogen cation.

Hydron may also refer to:

== People ==
- Isaiah "Hydron" Rodriguez, e-sports competitor, member of the Florida Mayhem team

=== Fictional characters ===
- Hydron (He-Man)
- Hydron (Salem's Seven)
- Prince Hydron, from Bakugan Battle Brawlers
- Hydron, from the videogame Red Earth (video game)

== Organizations ==
- Hydron, a Brazilian famiclone maker
- Hydron, a team that was champion of the 2021 STEM Racing
- Hydron (company), a truck manufacturer

== Other uses ==
- HydRON, a laser satellite communications programme of the European Space Agency
