= Hayley Todesco =

Canadian student inventor

- Born: Alberta, Canada
- Known for: 2014 Google Science Fair Winner

Hayley Todesco is a Canadian student inventor who is best known for winning the Google Science Fair in 2014 for her use of sand filters to clean up oil sands waste.

== Early life ==
Todesco was born and brought up in Alberta, Canada. At age 10, Todesco was inspired by the documentary, An Inconvenient Truth, to clean up the environment and began to participate in multiple science fairs.

At age 16, she developed a sand filtering system to combat water pollution issues which arise as a result of oil sands waste - specifically the by-product naphthentic acid. To develop this, Todesco spent two years in assistant professor Lisa Gieg's lab at the University of Calgary, where she had access to bacteria and oilsand tailings, and developed a sand bioreactor to break down naphthentic acid. The bioreactor was developed using binder clips, an IV bag and a popcorn bucket. Todesco worked in the lab after school, spent March breaks there and also skipped her grade 12 classes (at Queen Elizabeth Junior Senior High School) to develop this project while attending high school. Her bacteria-infused sand filtration bioreactor were able to degrade oil sand waste 14 times faster than current methods.

Todesco's project (Waste to water: biodegrading naphthenic acids using novel sand bioreactors) was selected as the Google Science Fair regional winner in Calgary in 2014, allowing her to proceed to the global competition as one of the fifteen finalists in September 2014, where Todesco won in her age category (17-18 year olds). She won a Lego trophy and a $25,000 scholarship from Google. Prior to Todesco's win in 2014, Canadian Ann Makosinski (then 15 years old) also won the Google Science Fair in her age category for a body heat-powered flashlight.

Todesco also received the 2014 Stockholm Junior Water Prize for her project, where she was awarded $15,000 and an additional $5,000 was allocated to her high school.

Since her win, Todesco has pursued an undergraduate degree in molecular genetics at the University of Alberta, where she was awarded a $50,000 President’s Centenary Entrance Citation undergraduate scholarship. She was recognized as one of Canada's Top 20 Under 20 by Plan Canada, and Canada’s Top 25 Environmentalists Under 25 by The Starfish in 2017.
