= Trafford Publishing =

United States vanity press

- Parent company: Author Solutions
- Founded: 1995 (Victoria, British Columbia)
- Founder: Bruce Batchelor, Marsha Batchelor, John Norris and Steve Fisher
- Country of origin: United States
- Headquarters location: Bloomington, Indiana
- Publication types: Books
- Official website: www.trafford.com

Trafford Publishing is a book publishing company for self-publishing authors. Formerly based in Victoria, British Columbia, Canada, Trafford Publishing is now based in Bloomington, Indiana, US.

== History ==
Trafford Publishing was founded in 1995 by Bruce and Marsha Batchelor, John Norris, and Steve Fisher, and specializes in print-on-demand (POD) publishing. The company prints books in short runs or on an individual basis. Bruce Batchelor was its CEO until 2006.

Trafford requires authors to pay for their own marketing and the initial costs of publishing. At its largest, Trafford employed around 150 people across offices in Canada, the United States, the United Kingdom, and Ireland. The company operated its own printing facility in Victoria, Canada, and also utilized the printing services of Lightning Source Inc. (LSI), a subsidiary of Ingram Books, and BookSurge LLC for its printing needs.

Trafford's services include self-publishing, online ordering, e-book conversion, and distribution.

In 2009, Trafford Publishing was acquired by Author Solutions Inc. under the ownership of Bertram Capital Management LLC, a private-equity firm based in San Mateo, California. This acquisition followed Author Solutions Inc.'s purchase of Xlibris in January 2009.
