= Firewing =

2002 novel by Kenneth Oppel

- Firewing first edition cover.
- Author: Kenneth Oppel
- Language: English
- Series: Silverwing series
- Genre: Children's, Fantasy novel
- Publisher: HarperCollins
- Publication date: April 18, 2002
- Publication place: Canada
- Media type: Print (Hardback & Paperback)
- Pages: 329 pages
- ISBN: 978-0-00-639194-4
- OCLC: 49250078
- Preceded by: Sunwing
- Followed by: Darkwing

Firewing is a children's book written by the Canadian author, Kenneth Oppel. It is the third book of the Silverwing novel series. The books include Silverwing, Sunwing, and the prequel Darkwing.

== Publication history ==
Firewing was first released in Canada in April 2002. This was followed with its release in the United Kingdom and the United States in September 2002 and February 2003, respectively.

== Reception ==
Kirkus Reviews praised Oppel's writing, calling it "beautiful in its evocation of the bat world". However, they noted a "problem with voice in the story", noting some poorly-worded sections. They added, "Such inelegant writing is unfortunate in the midst of a fine tale".

School Library Journal’s John Peters did not discuss Oppel's writing. Peters said the novel has "plenty of rousing action; special effects on a grand scale; a leavening of humor as well as stimulating thoughts on the nature of life, death, the afterlife, loyalty, courage, honesty, and other essential topics more than compensate for iffy internal logic".
