= Thiru =

Thiru may refer to:

- Thiru, an alternative rendering of the Tamil honorific Tiru, which is a variant of the Sanskrit Shri
- Thiru (director), Indian film director
- Thiru Ranga, a 2007 Indian masala film
- Thiruchitrambalam, a 2022 Indian Tamil-language film dubbed into Telugu and Kannada as Thiru

== See also ==
- Tiru (disambiguation)
- Shri (disambiguation)
