= Todesco =

Todesco may refer to:

== People ==
- Francisco Todesco (born 1937), Brazilian rower
- Hayley Todesco, Canadian inventor

== Places ==
- Palais Todesco, Vienna, Austria
