= Anoushka =

Anoushka or variants Anuschka, Annushka or Anushka may refer to:

== People ==
- Anoushka (Egyptian singer) (born 1960), stage name of Egyptian singer Wartanoush Garbis Selim
- Anoushka (given name), people carrying the name and all its variants

== Entertainment ==
- Anoushka (album), the 1998 debut album of Anoushka Shankar
- Annushka (film), 1959 Soviet drama film directed by Boris Barnet
- Anuschka (film), a 1942 German film by Helmut Käutner
- Anoushka, a character in The Master and Margarita

== Others ==
- Annushka (airline), Russian agricultural air company based in Shamakova, Russia
- Antonov An-2 transport aircraft (nicknamed Annushka)
