= Anoushka Sabnis =

Indian author and poet (born 2007)

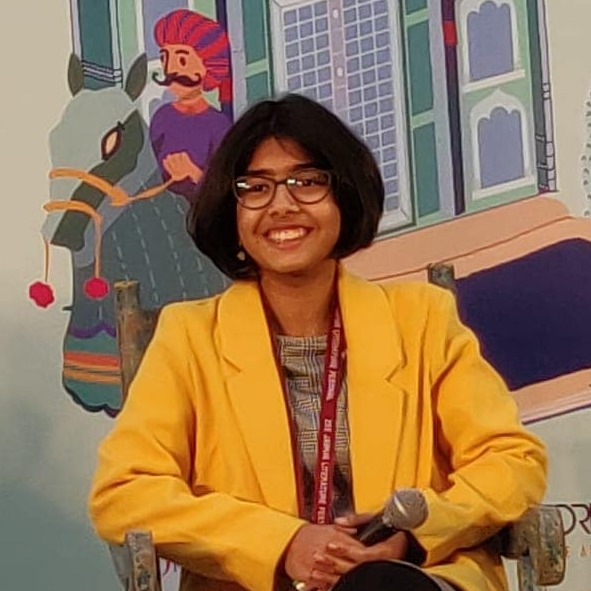
- Anoushka Sabnis speaking at the Jaipur Literature Festival, 2019
- Born: 27 January 2007 (age 19); New Delhi, India
- Education: King's College London, Springdales School, Dhaula Kuan, New Delhi
- Occupations: author poet speaker
- Awards: WEF Young Leader Award (2022), QCEC Gold Award (2020 & 2018)
- Website: www.biblioverse.in

Anoushka Sabnis (born January 27, 2007) is an Indian writer, poet and public speaker. She has published several books. She published her first book at the age of 10 using a self-publishing platform, and has since been active in advocating the benefits of reading and writing, especially for children.

== Education ==
Sabnis is a student at King's College London.

== Writing career ==
As a new year resolution in 2016, Sabnis took up a challenge of writing poems and ended the year with 52 poems written over the 52 weekends of the year. Her first book, Once Upon a Verse – because poems tell stories, is a collection of these poems, published by Partridge Publishing in December 2017.

She has since been writing and publishing short stories and poems.

== Awards and honours ==
Sabnis is a two-time recipient of the Gold Award at the Queen's Commonwealth Essay Competition, organised annually by the Royal Commonwealth Society, London, in 2018 and 2020.

Sabnis received the Young Leader Award for entrepreneurship and innovation and spoke on Teen Entrepreneurship at the 84th Annual Women Economic Forum 2022, in New Delhi.

== Public speaking ==
Sabnis is a regular speaker at national and international literary festivals where she talks about children's literature, inculcating reading habits in children and young adults and shares anecdotes from her own life and writing journey.

She was a speaker at the Jaipur Literature Festival 2019 and Jaipur Book Mark 2019. She spoke at the AIM Literary Festival in 2020. In 2021, Anoushka spoke about the importance of reading amongst children and young adults, at the third edition of the Orange City Literature Festival. In 2022, she spoke at the inaugural Orange City Literature Festival – Children's Edition on how young children can become writers. She spoke at the 84th Annual Women Economic Forum 2022 on Teen Entrepreneurship.

== Entrepreneurship ==
Sabnis started the website Biblioverse – the universe of books to encourage children in India to read and write.

== Published writing ==
- "A Bottle of Achaar" in The Great Indian Teen Fiction Collective, Publisher: Notion Press, December 2022
- "The Boy who saved the World" in Golden Light – Sterling Short Stories, Publisher: Scholastic India, June 2021
- Elijah – the Chosen One, Publisher: Amazon Kindle Direct Publishing, October 2020
- "The Earth I want to See When I Grow Up" in an anthology of essays, Pen the Change, Publisher: Authors Press, November 2018
- Once Upon a Verse – because poems tell stories, collection of 52 poems, Publisher: Partridge Publishing, December 2017
- "Importance of Body Image for Teenagers", Publisher: International Journal of Indian Psychology, September 2023

== Organisations ==
Recognised as a Global Goodwill Ambassador from Asia by the GGA Foundation April 2018.

== See also ==
- List of Indian writers
