= St. Michaels University School =

St. Michaels University School (SMUS)

Location
- 3400 Richmond Road; Victoria, British Columbia, V8P 4P5; Canada; 48°27′08″N 123°19′40″W

Information
- School type: Private Day and Boarding
- Founded: 1906 (University School); 1910 (St. Michaels School); 1971 (amalgamation)
- Headmaster: Dr. Jeff Aitken
- Grades: JK–12
- Enrollment: 1000
- Language: English
- Colours: Red, White, Black, Blue
- Mascot: A Blue Jaguar
- Team name: The Blue Jags
- Website: www.smus.ca

St. Michaels University School (abbreviated SMUS) is an independent day and boarding school in the municipality of Saanich, the largest and most populous municipality in the Capital Regional District and on Vancouver Island. Previous headmasters include Robert Snowden (1995-2017), David Penaluna (1988–94, John Schaffter (1977–88) and Mark Turner (2019-2024).

== Location ==
SMUS is located in Victoria, British Columbia, Canada, on the southern tip of Vancouver Island. The Senior and Middle School campus is located on Richmond Road in Saanich. The Junior School campus is situated on Victoria Avenue in Oak Bay.

== History ==
In 1906, University School was founded by Capt. R. V. Harvey, the Rev. W. W. Bolton and J. C. Barnacle. Four years later, in 1910, K. C. Symons founded St. Michael's School. St. Michael's School was unusual for its relatively large number of local day students for the period (as contrasted with University School's large number of boarders).

Facing financial difficulties and the death of its headmaster in 1970, University School merged with St. Michael's in 1971 to become St. Michaels University School. In 1973, the school began to enrol grade 1 and 2 students for the first time. In 1978, girls were accepted as day and boarding students in grades 10–12 for the first time, and the school began the process of becoming fully coeducational in 1985. A major expansion of the campus also began in 1985. In 1993, SMUS's boarding houses were renamed after the school's six founders: Bolton, Harvey, Winslow, Timmis, Symons, and Barnacle.

== Boarding houses ==
There are currently six houses: The houses are named after the headmasters and founders of the school.

- Barnacle
- Bolton
- Harvey
- Timmis
- Symons
- Winslow

The Senior School houses are only for boarding students who become a member of one of the houses when starting at SMUS and it becomes their place of residence and community throughout their time at the school.

== School performance ==
The average number of APs taken by SMUS students ranks first in the country across all schools as of 2012. The record for most APs taken and completed by a single student is 15. In terms of average mean grades, SMUS students achieved an average of 3.68, which was higher than the global average of 2.92. Of the 650 exams across 25 different AP subjects taken by 245 SMUS students, 81% of them received grades of three or higher on the five point scale, which was also higher than the worldwide rate of 59% achieving grades of three or higher.

== Motto ==
The motto of University School was "Mens sana in corpore sano," which means, "A healthy mind in a healthy body." St. Michael's School had the motto "Nihil Magnum Nisi Bonum," or, "Nothing is great unless it is good."

The current motto of St. Michaels University School is "Vivat!", or "Long live the school!" This ties into the school's song, "Vivat - Universitas!", written by Capt. R. V. Harvey originally for University School. The school uses "Vivat!" when cheering on a team.

== Campus ==
Richmond Road Campus:

- School House: Administration, Library, Mathematics
- Brown Hall: Multi-purpose space
- Sun Centre: Dining Hall, Student Commons, The Howard Cafe
- Chapel
- Crothall Centre for Humanities and the Arts: Classrooms, Lecture Theatre, Drama Room, Art Room,
- William Monkman Athletic Complex: Gymnasium, Squash Courts, Fitness Center
- John and Anne Schaffter Hall for Music
- Science Building: Science Classrooms and Computer Labs
- Infirmary
- Residence Buildings: Harvey/Symons, Barnacle/Winslow, Bolton/Timmis
- Wenman Pavilion: Senior Lounge
- Reynolds House: Head of School's Residence
- Middle School

== Accreditation and memberships ==
St. Michaels University School is accredited or a member of the following organizations:

- National Association of Independent Schools (NAIS)
- The Association of Boarding Schools (TABS)
- Canadian Accredited Independent Schools (CAIS)
- Independent Schools Association of British Columbia (ISABC)
- Headmasters' & Headmistresses' Conference (HMC)
- Secondary Schools Admissions Test (SSAT)
- Council for Advancement and Support of Education (CASE)
- Independent Educational Consultants Association (IECA)
- Western Boarding Schools Association (WBSA)
- The National Society of High School Scholars (NSHSS)

== Notable alumni ==
Entertainment:

- Timothy Williams (1983) – Composer and Orchestrator
- Manoj Sood (1981) – Actor
- Leslie Hope (1982) – Actress
- Andrew Sabiston (1982) – Actor
- Max Martini (1982) - Actor
- Kenneth Oppel (1985) – Author
- Bert Archer (1986) – Journalist/Author
- Afshin Feiz – Fashion Designer
- Bryce Soderberg (1998) – Musician-Lifehouse (band)
- Gold & Youth (Jeff Mitchelmore 2004, Matthew Lyall 2002) – Musicians

Politics:

- Jason Kenney – Conservative cabinet minister under Stephen Harper (Immigration and National Defence) and former Premier of Alberta, 1982 to 1984
- David Anderson – Former Liberal cabinet minister and former leader of the BC Liberal Party
- Jodie Emery – marijuana activist and politician
- Anthony C. E. Quainton – Former United States ambassador to Nicaragua

Sports:

- Steve Nash (1992) – Retired NBA player with the Phoenix Suns, Dallas Mavericks, and Los Angeles Lakers (Two-time NBA MVP)
- Ryan O'Byrne – NHL player with Toronto Maple Leafs
- Matt Pettinger – Former NHL player with Washington Capitals, Vancouver Canucks and Tampa Bay Lightning
- Mike Pyke – Former professional rugby union player with Edinburgh (Celtic League) and Montauban (French Top 14), currently professional Australian Rules Football Player with the Sydney Swans
- Gareth Rees – Former captain of the Canadian national rugby union team

Military:

- John Mogg - British Army - DSACEUR

Technology:

- Ann Makosinski inventor

Business:

- Stewart Butterfield (1991) – co-founder of Flickr and CEO at Slack
