= Brittany Wenger =

American student (born 1994)

Brittany Wenger (born 1994) is a pediatrician who was the first-place winner of the Google Science Fair when she was a high school student in 2012.

For her entry into the science fair, Wenger trained a statistical model to predict signs of breast cancer given nine features from the breast tissue samples as an input representation. She used neural networks to train the develop the statistical model, which is currently 99.1 percent sensitive to malignancy. As the first-place winner, she received a $50,000 scholarship.

Wenger spoke about her software at the TEDx Atlanta conference in 2012, and TEDx CERN conference in 2013. In 2013, representing Out-of-Door Academy, she was a finalist in the Intel Science Talent Search and was awarded 8th place.

Wenger studied at Duke University for her undergraduate degree and Icahn School of Medicine at Mount Sinai for her medical degree.
