= AuthorHouse =

American publishing company

- Parent company: Author Solutions
- Status: Active
- Founded: 1997
- Country of origin: United States
- Headquarters location: Bloomington, Indiana
- Publication types: Books
- Fiction genres: Fiction, non-fiction, children's books
- Official website: www.authorhouse.com/en

AuthorHouse, formerly known as 1stBooks, is a self-publishing company based in the United States. AuthorHouse uses print-on-demand business model and technology.

== History ==
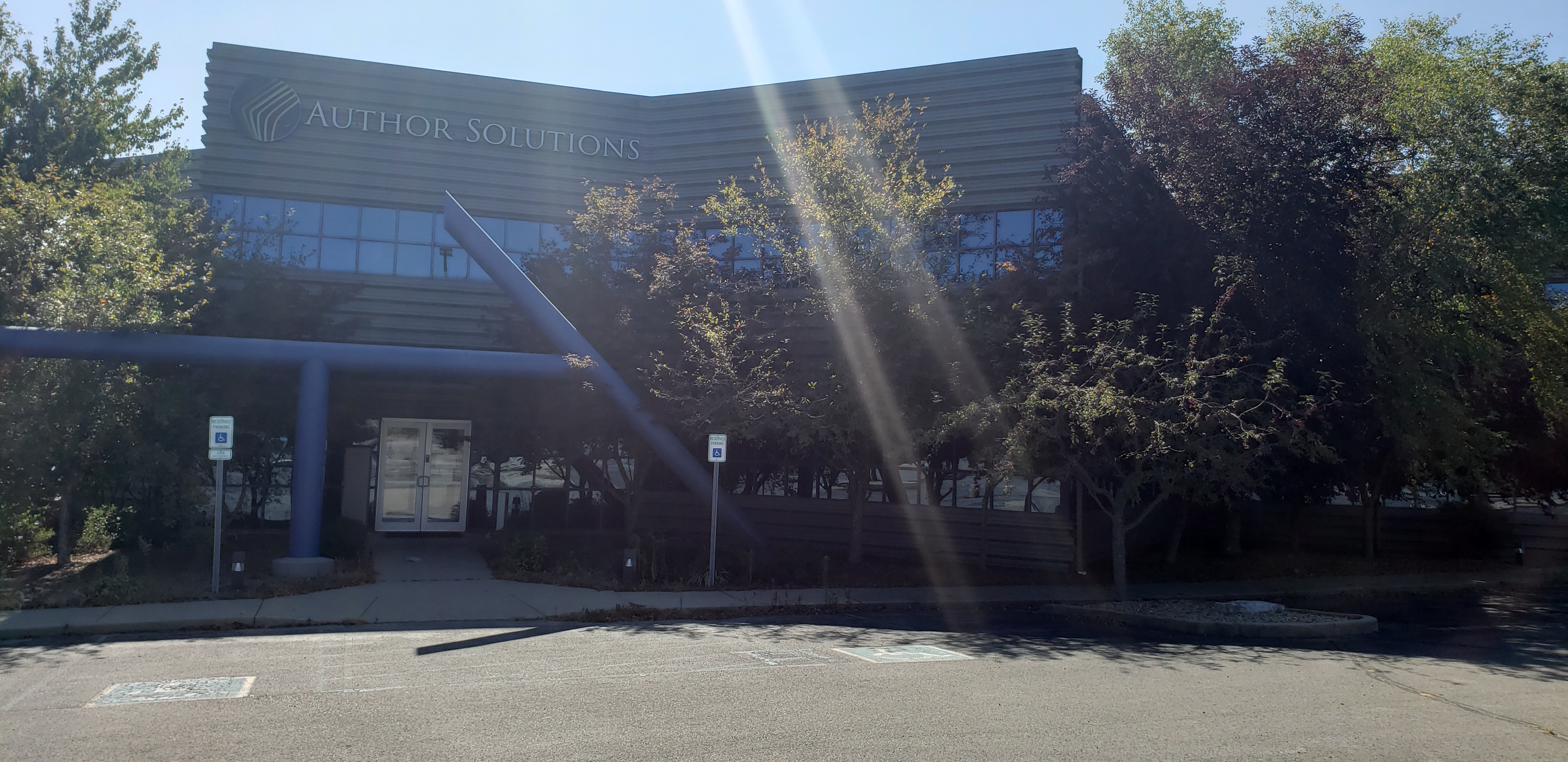
AuthorHouse Solutions

Originally called 1stBooks, the company was founded in Bloomington, Indiana, United States, in January 1997. Its first e-book appeared in June of that year. In January 1999, it started using print-on-demand technology to produce paper books. The AuthorHouse website states the company has published over 70,000 titles by 50,000 authors since 1997. The company opened an office in Milton Keynes, United Kingdom, in May 2004. In October 2005, AuthorHouse was nominated by the Indiana Chamber of Commerce for the Small Business of the Year Award. AuthorHouse won the Silver Award under the Service industry category.

The US investment group Bertram Capital purchased AuthorHouse in 2007 from Gazelle TechVentures, which had owned AuthorHouse since 2002. Later in 2007, Bertram established Author Solutions and acquired AuthorHouse competitor iUniverse, before relocating its operations to Indiana in early 2008.

== Brandewyne lawsuit ==
In August 2006, a Kansas trial court ordered AuthorHouse to pay $240,000 in punitive damage as well as $230,000 in actual damage to romance author Rebecca Brandewyne and her parents for publishing a book by her ex-husband that was "harmful" and libelous of them. AuthorHouse was also ordered to pay $20,000 each to Brandewyne's parents for the damage. Although the court acknowledged that AuthorHouse employed a business model that placed a degree of responsibility for the content of works upon the authors, in this case it found that AuthorHouse had failed to act when it was informed that the book might include libelous content.
