= Fort Worth Country Day School =

Private school in Fort Worth, Texas, US

Fort Worth Country Day
- Fort Worth, Texas; United States

Information
- School type: Private
- Motto: Humanitas per disciplinam (Humanities through discipline)
- Opened: September 9, 1963
- Headmaster: Eric V. Lombardi
- Teaching staff: 109.1 (FTE)
- Grades: JK-12
- Enrollment: 1116
- Colors: Red and blue
- Mascot: Falcon
- Rival: Trinity Valley School
- Website: www.fwcd.org

Fort Worth Country Day (FWCD) is a JK-12 private, independent, coeducational, nondenominational college-preparatory school located on approximately 100 acres in Fort Worth, Texas, United States. It is accredited by the Independent Schools Association of the Southwest (ISAS). ISAS is a member of the International Council Advancing Independent School Accreditation (ICAISA).

The school broke ground in 1963 and opened nine months later on September 9, 1963, with grades one through nine. 210 students were initially enrolled. The Sid Richardson Gymnasium opened in 1967. Eight additional buildings and annexes opened in the 1970s and early 1980s. In the 1990s three buildings were built. In 2008, the Fischer Dining Pavilion opened. In 2016, the Patton Field House opened as a replacement for old locker and weight rooms in the gyms.

== Notable alumni ==
- Shree Bose, scientist
- Bill Curtis, software engineer
- Pete Geren, former United States Secretary of the Army
- Harriet Sansom Harris, actress
- Patrick Jeffers, former NFL player
- Emily Lakdawalla, Senior Editor of The Planetary Society
- J. Mack Slaughter, Jr., actor
- Taylor Smith, member of the 2017 US National Women's Soccer Team
- Carlson Young, actress on MTV's Scream
