= Bert Archer =

Canadian author, journalist, travel writer, essayist

- Born: Montreal, Quebec, Canada
- Occupations: Writer, journalist
- Writing career
- Period: 1994–present
- Notable work: The End of Gay (and the Death of Heterosexuality)

Bert Archer is a Canadian author, journalist, travel writer, essayist, critic, and former editor in chief of the Montreal Gazette.

Archer was born in Montreal and lived in Calgary and Vancouver. He attended St. Michael's University School in Victoria, British Columbia, and then went to the University of St. Michael's College at the University of Toronto, and Trinity College, Dublin. He wrote for the University of Toronto student newspaper The Varsity, and was editor-in-chief of The Mike, the college newspaper.

== Journalism ==
In 1994, he was hired as an editorial assistant by Quill & Quire, Canada's national book trade magazine. Two years later, as review editor, Archer was pressured to resign after writing an essay in the Financial Post which some considered derogatory to certain elements in the Canadian publishing industry, specifically, the small presses. He was subsequently hired as a columnist for the Toronto Star, Canada's largest circulation newspaper, to review books published by small Canadian publishers.

As a literary journalist, Archer courted controversy, calling into question the reputations of Canadian literary figures such as Margaret Atwood and Michael Ondaatje. Greg Gatenby, founder of Toronto's International Festival of Authors, said of Archer being given space in prominent papers to write about books, "It's like having an eight-year-old at the helm of a 747." A profile in The Globe and Mail on the release of his first book was titled Bad Boy Bert.

Since then, Archer has been an editor at the alternative arts magazine Now, where he wrote about books, and the now defunct Eye Weekly, where he was production editor and for which he wrote regular op-ed pieces. From 2007–2015, he was a real estate columnist for Toronto Life magazine.

Since 2006, Archer has been writing about travel as a freelancer for several papers, magazines, and sites in Canada and the US, including the Globe and Mail, Hazlitt, the Washington Post, and Zoomer magazine.

In 2022, he was named editor in chief of the Montreal Gazette, Canada's oldest daily newspaper, a position he held until mid-2023.

== Books ==
Archer is the author of The End of Gay (and the Death of Heterosexuality), published in Canada in 1999, in the US in 2002, and the UK in 2004. The book argues that there is no such thing as inherent sexual identity, and that sexual behaviour is a product of many factors, personal will not least among them.

Archer has also contributed chapters to several books: "Why Boys Are Better Than Girls" for What I Meant to Say (2006), Creating a Toronto of the Imagination for uTOpia (2006), as well as chapters for its follow-up, GreenTOpia (2007), and a book about water called HtO (2008), excerpted in the National Post.
