= Silver Wings =

Silver Wings may refer to:

- Silver Wings (film), a 1922 American silent film
- Silver Wings (parachute team), the United States Army Maneuver Center of Excellence Command Exhibition Parachute Team at Fort Benning, Georgia
- Silver Wings (service organization), an organization dedicated to developing civilians’ leadership skills and community service
- A 1969 hit country song from Merle Haggard's A Portrait of Merle Haggard album

== See also ==
- Silverwing (disambiguation)
