= IUniverse =

American self-publishing company

iUniverse
- Parent company: Author Solutions (2007)
- Founded: 1999
- Country of origin: United States
- Headquarters location: Bloomington, Indiana
- Publication types: Books
- Imprints: Writers Club Press
- Official website: iuniverse.com

iUniverse, founded in October 1999, is an American self-publishing company based in Bloomington, Indiana. The company has been owned by Author Solutions since 2007. Author Solutions has been owned by Najafi Companies since 2015.

== History ==
iUniverse focuses on print-on-demand self-publishing and a service the company refers to as "assisted self-publishing" which critics say is indicative of vanity press since authors are asked to pay from US$400 to $15,000 for additional services. Soon after they were founded, Barnes & Noble purchased a 49% stake in the company. As part of the agreement, Barnes & Noble offered select iUniverse titles both in their online bookstore and at their physical stores.

In 2004, Amy Fisher's memoir, If I Knew Then, about serving seven years in prison on first-degree aggravated assault charges for shooting Mary Jo Buttafuoco, became the best-selling book in iUniverse's history, selling more than 32,000 copies up to 2004. According to a 2005 Publishers Weekly article, out of the more than 18,000 titles published by iUniverse until 2004, only 83 had sold at least 500 copies and only 14 titles had been sold through physical Barnes & Noble stores.

In September 2007, iUniverse was purchased by Author Solutions, the parent company of hedge fund-owned rival AuthorHouse. A year later, in 2008, iUniverse operations moved from Lincoln, Nebraska to the Author Solution's headquarters in Bloomington, Indiana. In 2015, Author Solutions was sold to The Najafi Companies, a private-equity firm.

== See also ==
- Alternative media
- List of self-publishing companies
- Print on demand
- Small press
