= Airborn (novel) =

Novel from 2004 by Kenneth Oppel

- Airborn first edition cover.
- Author: Kenneth Oppel
- Cover artist: Peter Riddihoff
- Language: English
- Series: Matt Cruse series
- Genre: Fantasy, alternate history novel, steampunk
- Publisher: HarperCollins
- Publication date: February 5, 2004
- Publication place: Canada
- Media type: Print (hardback & paperback); Audiobook
- Pages: 321 pp (first edition)
- ISBN: 978-0-00-200537-1
- OCLC: 53162914
- Followed by: Skybreaker

Airborn is a young adult adventure book written by Canadian author Kenneth Oppel, and is the first novel in the Airborn series. It follows Matt Cruse, a cabin boy on a transoceanic passenger airship who embarks on a search for a legendary flying creature whose origins are shrouded in mystery. The book was published in Canada on 5 February 2004, and in the United States on 11 May 2004 by HarperCollins. In Canada, the book received the 2004 Governor General's Award for children's literature.

== Plot summary ==
Fourteen-year-old Matt Cruse is a cabin boy for the Aurora, a transoceanic passenger airship that stays afloat using a gas called "hydrium". While on lookout duty, he spots a damaged balloon carrying an unconscious old man. Matt saves the man, whose name is Benjamin Molloy, only for him to die shortly after being taken aboard. In his dying breath, Molloy rambles about "beautiful creatures" he supposedly saw on his ill-fated voyage.

One year later, Matt leaves his home in Lionsgate City, a fictionalized Vancouver, to accompany the Aurora on its voyage to Sydney, Australia. Despite loving his mother and sisters, Matt is relieved to be in the air, where he feels closest to his father—a former sailmaker who died in an accident aboard the Aurora. Matt is disappointed to learn that the Junior Sailmaker position he was promised has instead been given to the airship fleet's heir, Bruce Lunardi. One day into the voyage, an ornithopter delivers two passengers to the ship; Kate de Vries and her chaperone Marjorie Simpkins. Kate tells Matt that she is Benjamin Molloy's granddaughter and shows him detailed drawings of flying panther-like creatures from Molloy's journal. Intrigued by the possibility that the creatures live their whole lives in the air, Kate hopes to find proof that they are real.

A few nights later, the ship is raided by the notorious criminal Vikram Szpirglas. His gang of pirates plunder the ship of all its valuables and kill the chief wireless officer. Before the pirates can depart, both ships are caught in a storm. The pirate vessel crashes into the Aurora and tears a hole in the ship's hull, depleting its supply of hydrium. As the sailmakers scramble to repair the falling Aurora, Matt spots an island and tells the crew to steer toward it. The ship crash-lands on the island, which Kate realizes is the island from her grandfather's journal. Kate convinces Matt to help her explore the island, where they discover the skeleton of a large winged creature. A few minutes later, they find an injured member of the same species, which they decide to call a "cloud cat".

Simpkins locks Kate in her room, hoping to prevent her from associating with Matt. As the ship's repairs near completion, Kate drugs Simpkins, escapes her room, and takes one last chance to photograph the island's wildlife. Matt and Bruce begin looking for her until they find Kate hiding in a tree, looking at a cloud cat's nest. Matt and Bruce lure the cloud cat into a clearing with a fish, but the shutter of Kate's camera provokes it into attacking. Bruce suffers a severe leg injury in the attack, while Matt and Kate escape deeper into the forest. The two of them stumble upon the pirates, who have set up a secret base on the island. Unrecognized, they ask for shelter in the pirate camp and plan to sneak away during the night. But during their escape, Kate and Matt are apprehended and thrown into a hydrium pit with no oxygen. They use Kate's harem pants as a balloon to lift themselves out of the put, just as Szpirglas' crew sets out to silence the passengers of the Aurora. Kate begins crying, blaming herself for putting everyone else in danger. Acting on the feelings he has developed for her, Matt kisses her. She asks him to kiss her again, and stops crying.

Kate and Matt find an injured Bruce, and the three make their way to the Aurora, which is being held hostage by eight pirates. They are able to undo the landing lines, causing the ship to float away. Using his knowledge of the ship's flight system, Matt temporarily takes control and steers the ship away from the island. After tending to Bruce's wounds in the infirmary, Matt brings a sleeping elixir to the cook so that it can be added to the pirates' soup. Szpirglas' crew murders Bruce in the engine room and chases Matt onto the hull of the Aurora. Szpirglas pushes Matt off the ship, but Matt is able to grab onto the ship's tail fin. While attempting to dislodge Matt, Szpirglas is attacked by a group of cloud cats and thrown into the sea. The passengers are saved when Matt steers the Aurora back on course.

Six months later, Matt meets Kate in Paris, where she is presenting her cloud cat skeleton and photographs from the voyage. Matt reveals that he will use the reward money he received for finding Szpirglas' base of operations to attend the Airship Academy. Kate plans to begin her zoology studies at a university.

== Characters ==
- Matt Cruse is the cabin boy on the Aurora and the crow's nest watchman when the novel begins. Hoping to support his family in Lionsgate City, he joins the Aurora on another voyage after he is promised a position as a junior sailmaker.
- Kate de Vries is the scientifically-minded granddaughter of Benjamin Molloy, the discoverer of "cloud cats". Approximately fifteen years of age, she is stubborn and adventurous, much to the dismay of her chaperone, Marjorie Simpkins.
- Bruce Lunardi is the wealthy heir to the successful airship line that owns the Aurora. Consigned to the ship during his late teens, he unintentionally deprives Matt of the junior sailmaker position.
- Captain Walken is the captain of the Aurora and serves as a mentor to Matt.
- Baz is a cabin boy on the Aurora who stays in a cabin with Matt during the voyage. He is Matt's partner, and shares a brotherly relationship with him.
- Vikram Szpirglas is a fugitive from justice and the captain of a gang of pirates that attack the Aurora, hoping to steal its valuables.

== Awards ==
In November 2004, the Canadian edition of Airborn won the Governor General's Award for children's literature; the jury described the novel as "a feat of powerful imagination." The book also received a Blue Ribbon award from the The Bulletin of the Center for Children's Books, and won the prestigious Red Maple Award presented by the Ontario Library Association in 2005.

In the United States, the Young Adult Library Services Association nominated Airborn for the Michael L. Printz Award. The book also won the Ruth and Sylvia Schwartz Children's Book Award, and made the 2006 International Board on Books for Young People list.

The audiobook version of the novel, narrated by David Kelly and a full cast, won the 2007 Audie Award for Young Adult Title, and was a finalist for the Audie Award for Audio Drama and Audie Award for Multi-Voiced Performance.

== Film adaptation ==
In 2005, Universal Pictures announced a planned film adaptation of the novel, with Stephen Sommers as director and Thomas Dean Donnelly and Joshua Oppenheimer set to write the screenplay. However, in 2008 Kenneth Oppel indicated that the project had been dropped. On March 19, 2012, Halifax Films and Michael Donovan optioned the book for another film adaptation. Oppel was hired to write the preliminary script, and would have been an executive producer of the movie. However, Oppel later wrote on his website that the producers of the film had dropped out, and that he owns the rights to the book again.

== Publication history ==
Airborn was first released in Canada on 5 February 2004 by HarperCollins in hardcover. Shortly afterwards, the book was released in the United Kingdom and the United States on April 15 and May 11, respectively. Paperback editions of the novel were released in Canada on 21 October 2004, and in the UK and US in 2005.

- 2004, CAN, HarperCollins ISBN 978-0-00-200537-1, Pub date February 5, 2004, Hardback
- 2004, UK, Hodder Children's Books ISBN 978-0-340-87855-2, Pub date April 15, 2004, Hardback
- 2004, US, Eos ISBN 978-0-06-053180-5, Pub date May 11, 2004, Hardback
- 2004, CAN, HarperCollins ISBN 978-0-00-639259-0, Pub date October 21, 2004, Paperback
- 2005, UK, Hodder Children's Books ISBN 978-0-340-87856-9, Pub date January 13, 2005, Paperback
- 2005, US, Eos ISBN 978-0-06-053182-9, Pub date May 24, 2005, Paperback

== See also ==
- Skybreaker
- Starclimber
- Silver Wing
