= Sri Sri =

Sri Sri may refer to:

- Sri Sri, an honorific title used for spiritual persons, see Sri
- Prabhat Ranjan Sarkar (1921–1990), founder of the social and spiritual movement Ananda Marga (the Path of Bliss)
- Ravi Shankar (spiritual leader) (born 1956), founder of the Art of Living Foundation
- Sri Sri (writer) (1910–1983), Telugu poet, and film lyricist
- Sri Sri (film), a 2016 Telugu drama film

== See also ==
- SRI (disambiguation)
