= Annushka (airline) =

Russian Agricultural Air Company

- Founded: 1993
- Hubs: Shumakova, Stavropol
- Fleet size: 16
- Headquarters: Shumakova, Stavropol
- Key people: Nikolai Lysenko (Director)
- Website: http://anmikom.ru/

Annushka is a Russian agricultural air company based in Shamakova, Russia. They specialise in crop spraying. Their AOC was revoked in August 2010 but was subsequently restored. In 2008 6 Cessna 188 AgTrucks were added to the fleet. Annushka operates from their own airfield in the Alexandria-St George district of Stavropolskii Krai.

== Fleet ==
Aircraft type	Active	Notes
Antonov An-2	16	RA-01402, RA-17882, RA-17981, RA-31403, RA-31405, RA-31455, RA-31479, RA-31510, RA-33317, RA-40214, RA-62683, RA-71262, RA-84753, RA-40461, RA-43981, RA-71193
