= Sunwing (novel) =

1999 children's fantasy novel by Kenneth Oppel

- Sunwing first edition cover
- Author: Kenneth Oppel
- Language: English
- Series: Silverwing series
- Genre: Fantasy novel
- Publisher: HarperCollins
- Publication date: August 12, 1999
- Publication place: Canada
- Media type: Print (hardback & paperback)
- Pages: 243 pp (first edition)
- ISBN: 978-0-00-648166-9
- OCLC: 41312815
- Preceded by: Silverwing
- Followed by: Firewing

Sunwing is a children's book written in 1999 by Canadian author Kenneth Oppel. It is the second book in the Silverwing series, preceded by Silverwing and succeeded by Firewing.

== Publication history ==
Sunwing was first released in Canada in August 1999, in the UK in January 2000, and in the US in February 2000.

== Reception ==
Sarah Ellis of Quill & Quire called it a "book of big effects" and a "natural for the on-screen generation." Kirkus Reviews wrote that it "stands well on its own" and praised the plot and the characterisation. Jill McClay of Resource Links called it a "marvelous achievement that will be enjoyed by readers of all ages", featuring "finely drawn" characters and a "richly imagined, colourless world".

Sunwing won the 2000 Ruth Schwartz Children's Book Award for Young Adult/Middle Grade novel.
