= Arsh Shah Dilbagi =

Indian inventor and roboticist

- Born: Arsh Shah Dilbagi; March 26, 1998 (age 28); Panipat, Haryana, India
- Other name: Robo
- Education: Princeton University
- Occupations: Inventor, Founder of Arido
- Years active: 2011-present
- Known for: TALK: An Assistive Device that converts Breath into Speech. CLUMSY: A quadruped robot.
- Website: robo.im

Arsh Shah Dilbagi (born March 26, 1998) is an Indian scientist, inventor and roboticist. He completed his undergraduate at Princeton University studying Operations Research and Financial Engineering. He is the founder of Arido about which very little has been made public.

== Career ==
=== 2023 ===
- In 2023, the company of which he was CEO and Founder, Zage, shut down after having previously participated in Y-Combinator's Summer 2021 cohort.

=== 2015 ===
- In August 2015, he established an exhibit housing a quadruped robot dog, at the Science and Innovation Museum in Presidential Residence at New Delhi. The exhibit is named 'A Day in the Life of a Robot Dog - CLUMSY'.

=== 2014 ===
- In 2014, he developed 'TALK' which won the Voters' Choice Award at Google Science Fair 2014.

== Notable work ==
=== 2016 ===
- CLUMSY, A quadruped robot with 16 Servo Motors.

=== 2014 ===
- TALK, an Assistive Device to convert breath into speech. It uses the variations in person's breath help him either dictate letters which are further combined and synthesised as sentences or speak-out specific commands/phrases depending on the mode selected.

== Notable awards ==
=== 2015 ===
- Intel International Science and Engineering Fair (ISEF): Third Grand Award in the Embedded Systems Category, conferred by Intel and Society for Science at Intel ISEF 2015 held at Pittsburgh, USA. and American Psychological Association (APA) Third place ($500) . and American Intellectual Property Law Association (AIPLA): first place at the same event.

=== 2014 ===
- Google Science Fair (GSF): Google Science Fair Voter's Choice Award, conferred by Google Inc. at GSF 2014, held at Google HQ., Mountain View, California, USA.
- Special Mention (4th place) in the E-Inclusion & Accessibility category at Manthan Award, India Habitat Centre, New Delhi, India.
- Second position at i3 - Indian Innovation Initiative 2014 held at Noida Expo Mart, Noida, India.

=== 2011 ===
- INSPIRE Award: Winning the 1st Position in North Zone, India for project 'Unmanned Ground Vehicle (UGV)' in INSPIRE National Science Competition held at Pragati Maidan, New Delhi.
