= Silverwing (TV series) =

Animated television series

- DVD cover
- Genre: Animation; Fantasy
- Based on: Silverwing by Kenneth Oppel
- Written by: Gary Jones; Richard Side
- Directed by: Keith Ingham
- Voices of: Bill Switzer; Sharon Alexander; Randall Carpenter; Richard Newman; Michael Dobson; Pam Hyatt; Shirley Millner; Richard Ian Cox; Ian James Corlett; Billy Rosemberg; Matt Hill; Lee Tockar; Candus Churchill; Stevie Vallance
- Composers: Brian Carson; Ari Wise
- Countries of origin: Philippines; Canada
- Original language: English
- No. of seasons: 1
- No. of episodes: 13

Production
- Producer: Cathy Schoch
- Editor: Don Briggs
- Running time: 22 minutes
- Production companies: Philippine Animation Studio; Bardel Entertainment

Original release
- Network: Teletoon
- Release: September 6 – December 14, 2003

Silverwing is a 2003 adventure fantasy animated series based on Kenneth Oppel's novel of the same name. The traditional animated series has elements of computer animation.

== Synopsis ==
Years before the migration, the animals of birds and beasts, started a Great War for the balance of nature and territories to all species. The bats, having not picked a side during the war, were exiled to the dark of night, never to fly during the day again. but Shade goes on a journey to reason with them.

== Characters ==
=== Bats ===
- Shade (voiced by Bill Switzer): A travelling Silverwing bat who separated from the colony.
- Marina (voiced by Sharon Alexander): An exiled Brightwing bat who Shade befriends.
- Goth (voiced by Michael Dobson): A cannibalistic bat. He and Throbb escape the laboratory.
- Throbb (voiced by Richard Newman): Goth's brother in-law.
- Frieda (voiced by Pam Hyatt): The banded chief elder of the colony.
- Bathsheba (voiced by Shirley Millner): A selfish member of the Silverwing elders. She later betrays the colony.
- Ariel (voiced by Randall Carpenter): Shade's mother whose mate, Cassiel left the colony.
- Mercury (voiced by Ian James Corlett): Frieda's loyal guardian and the leader of female bats.
- Chinook (voiced by Matt Hill): One of Shade's friends.
- Zephyr (voiced by Richard Newman): A blind albino bat living in the cathedral spire.
- Scirocco (voiced by Ian James Corlett): The charismatic shapeshifting leader for the colony of banded bats in the mountain cabin.
- Penelope (voiced by Randall Carpenter): One of the banded bats, whom Shade rescued.
- Hector (voiced by Lee Tockar): Chinook's father and one of the Silverwing elders.
- Breeze (voiced by Stevie Vallance): One of Shade's friends.

=== Others ===
- Brutus (voiced by Richard Newman): The leader of the owls. He later renounces the war.
- Orestes (voiced by Richard Ian Cox): Brutus' son. He later helps the bats redeem other animals.
- Atlas (voiced by Michael Dobson): Brutus' owl assistant.
- Ursa (voiced by Candus Churchill): A spirit bear who later becomes the leader of beasts opposing the wolves.
- Luger (voiced by Lee Tockar): The leader of the wolves whom Goth recruited.
- Remus (voiced by Richard Ian Cox): The selfish king of the rats and Romulus' brother.
- Romulus (voiced by Lee Tockar): Remus' brother. He later replaces Remus as king.

== Episodes ==
The episodes were released in the miniseries format as three television films, with new endings created for the first two parts. They included A Glimpse of the Sun, Towers of Fire and Redemption.

No.	Title	Original air date (Teletoon)
1	"A Glimpse of the Son"	September 6, 2003
When Shade inadvertently breaks the law, the owls destroy Tree Haven.
2	"No Bat is an Island"	September 7, 2003
After being separated from the colony while migrating, Shade ends up on an island and meets Marina. He asks her to meet Frieda.
3	"Pigeon Court"	September 14, 2003
Shade and Marina evade the pigeons at the city.
4	"Bat in the Belfry"	September 21, 2003
Zephyr teaches Shade how to use echo projection.
5	"Dark Alliance"	September 28, 2003
After meeting Goth and Throbb, Shade and Marina learn that the two are killing animals.
6	"Friends in Deed"	October 5, 2003
Orestes frees Shade and Marina, and escape from the group of owls. After Orestes drives the bats from the power station, Goth gets electrocuted and falls unconscious.
7	"Everything Is Not Black and White"	October 12, 2003
Shade and Marina ask Ursa to defend the animals from the wolves after a bear cub's mother is killed. Meanwhile, Goth regains consciousness.
8	"Deception"	November 2, 2003
Shade and Marina continue evading Goth and Throbb, while Bathsheba briefly becomes the leader.
9	"I'm with the Band"	November 9, 2003
At the mountains, Shade and Marina save a group of banded bats from Goth and Throbb, who steal the rest of the bands. Meanwhile, the colony arrives at the airport.
10	"Rats"	November 23, 2003
After Romulus defeats Remus at the junkyard, Shade and Marina reunite with Orestes. As the colony and Bathsheba leave, Ariel, Frieda and Mercury survive the airport.
11	"Strange Batfellows"	November 30, 2003
After distracting Goth and Throbb, Shade and his allies leave the mine.
12	"Hibernaculum"	December 7, 2003
After arriving at Hibernaculum, Shade reunites with the colony, and Goth and Throbb recruit the wolves.
13	"Day of Judgment"	December 14, 2003
After the bears drive away the wolves and Goth is seemingly killed by collapsing icicles, the animals congratulate the bats and permit them to fly outside night or day.

== Production ==
The series was produced by Bardel Entertainment, with additional work done by the Philippine Animation Studio. It was originally distributed by Bardel and B Wooding Media.

Early plans as of 2001 consisted of a theatrical movie with a budget of US$25–30 million to be co-produced with the UK's Melwood Pictures, followed by a US$5 million TV series developed with participation from an unspecified American broadcaster.

A second season of 13 episodes was announced to be in development in 2003, along with an online video game website with 13 levels to match the episodes. The website had over 20 games available by mid-2004, while the planned season was quietly shelved later that year.

== Release ==
=== Broadcast ===
Silverwing was commissioned by and first aired on Teletoon in Canada in autumn 2003.

In the United States, the series was shown on Toon Disney's Jetix block in autumn 2005, with Jetix later airing the show internationally.

=== Home media ===
The full series has been released on DVD in the United States (Funimation) and the United Kingdom.

== Reception ==
Silverwing has had mostly positive reception.

Animation Magazine ran a six-part series about the show in 2003, viewing it as "a grand miniseries" that "really raises the bar in TV animation". Common Sense Media described Silverwing as a "great kids' series" and gave it 4 out of 5 stars, adding however that its "complex, political story themes" may present difficulties for younger children.

An encyclopedic review considered the series to be relatively accurate to the text, despite minor changes. "The program conducted its affairs well without stumbling and therefore stands as a high point in the often creatively checkered world of Canadian television animation."

=== Awards and nominations ===
Year	Association	Category	Nominee	Result	Ref.
2004	Gemini Awards	Best Original Music Score for a Dramatic Series	Brian Carson, Ari Wise	Nominated	
2004	Vancouver International Digital Festival (Vidfest)	Interactive Design: Entertainment	Website: silverwing.tv	2nd	
