= Darkwing (novel) =

2007 young adult fantasy novel by Kenneth Oppel

- Darkwing first edition cover.
- Author: Kenneth Oppel
- Illustrator: Keith Thompson
- Cover artist: Christian Alzmann
- Language: English
- Series: Silverwing
- Genre: Fantasy novel
- Publisher: HarperCollins
- Publication date: August 16, 2007
- Publication place: Canada
- Media type: Print (hardback & paperback)
- Pages: 322 pp (first edition)
- ISBN: 978-0-00-200744-3
- OCLC: 123127375
- Preceded by: Firewing

Darkwing (known as Dusk in the United Kingdom) is a 2007 young adult fantasy novel by Canadian author Kenneth Oppel. It is the prequel and fourth book of the Silverwing series, and takes place 65 million years before the events of the first book. It describes the origins of the war between the birds and the beasts.

== Publication history ==
Darkwing was first released in Canada and the United States in August 2007. It was shortly followed with its release in the United Kingdom in May 2008. Below is the release details for the first edition hardback and paperback copies in these three publication regions.

- 2007, CAN, HarperCollins ISBN 978-0-00-200744-3, Pub date August 16, 2007, Hardback
- 2007, US, Eos ISBN 978-0-06-085054-8, Pub date August 21, 2007, Hardback
- 2008, UK, Faber Children's Books ISBN 978-0-571-23832-3, Pub date May 1, 2008, Paperback
- 2008, US, Eos ISBN 978-0-06-085056-2, Pub date August 26, 2008, Paperback
- 2008, CAN, HarperCollins ISBN 978-1-55468-015-3, Pub date October 17, 2008, Paperback

== Reception ==
Darkwing is a Junior Library Guild book. It was well received by critics, including starred reviews from Booklist and Kirkus Reviews.

Booklist's Michael Cart called the novel "richly plotted" and "fast-paced" and highlighted how "Oppel writes with keen insight and empathy about the condition of being other". Eric Norton, writing on behalf of School Library Journal, also pointed out Oppel's "celebration of difference". Although conceding that the novel is "sometimes too heavily anthropomorphized", Cart concluded that the novel provides "captivating reading from beginning to end".

Kirkus Reviews highlighted the novel's "rich sensory details [that] bring to life the Paleocene epoch of 65 million years ago", as well the "lively prose and sheer imagination". Norton expanded on this sentiment, writing that Oppel provides "a wonderful imagining of a pivotal moment in evolution".

Kirkus Reviews and VOYA included Darkwing on their lists of the best books of 2007. It was also a finalist for the 2008 TD Canadian Children's Literature Award, and won the 2008 Ruth & Sylvia Schwartz Children's Book Award for Young Adult/Middle Grade Novel.
