= Shree Bose =

American scientist; grand prize winner at the 2011 Google Science Fair

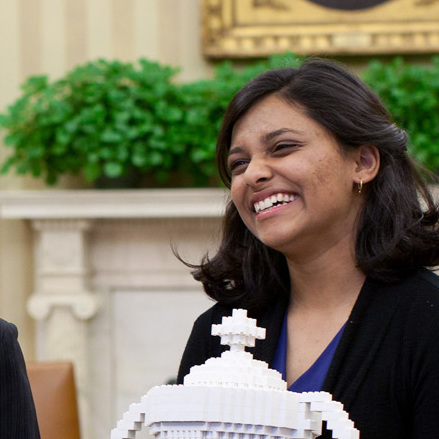
- Bose in 2011 (Google Science Fair winner)
- Born: March 27, 1994 (age 32); Santa Rosa, California, U.S.
- Education: Harvard College (B.A., 2016); Duke University (MD–PhD, 2023)
- Awards: 2011 Google Science Fair Grand Prize; 2023 Forbes 30 Under 30
- Scientific career
- Fields: Cancer research
- Website: shreebose.com

Shree Bose (born March 27, 1994) is an American scientist, inventor, and speaker. She is known as the grand prize winner of the inaugural Google Science Fair in 2011. She is currently a member of the Physician Scientist Development Program (PSDP) program at the University of Chicago Medical Center, having graduated with an MD–PhD from Duke University School of Medicine in 2023. For high school, she went to Fort Worth Country Day School and graduated in May, 2012. She studied at Harvard College until May 2016. In 2014, she cofounded Piper, a STEM education company creating engineering kits for children.

== Career ==
=== Google Science Fair ===
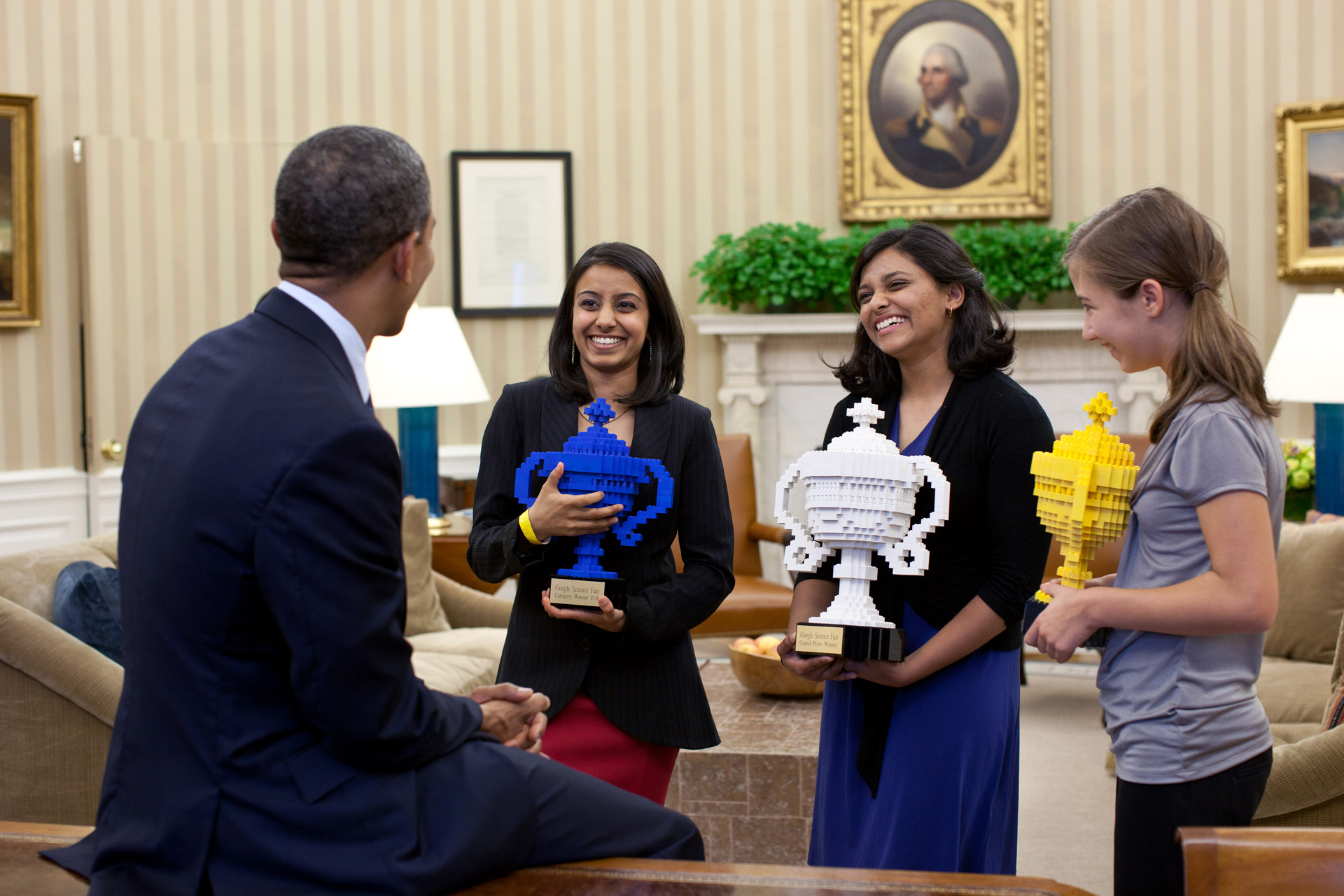
Obama congratulates Google Science Fair winners Naomi Shah, Shree Bose, and Lauren Hodge

In 2011, Shree Bose, then 17 years old and living in Fort Worth, Texas, won the grand prize and $50,000 for her research on the chemotherapy drug, cisplatin, that is commonly taken by women with ovarian cancer, tackling the problem of cancer cells growing resistant to cisplatin over time. Bose has cited her grandfather's passing from lung cancer as one of the drivers of her research. She conducted the research for her science fair project under the mentorship of Dr. Alakananda Basu at the University of North Texas Health Science Center.

Bose gave a talk alongside Lauren Hodge and Naomi Shah—the two other winners of the 2011 Google Science Fair—about their projects and paths in science at TEDxWomen 2011. As part of the grand prize, Bose and her family visited CERN, which coincided with the day the discovery of the Higgs boson was announced.

The main-belt asteroid 25178 Shreebose was named in her honor.

=== Piper ===
In 2014, she co-founded Piper, a STEM education company creates computer engineering kits that teach children about engineering through the game of Minecraft. The company was created in part with funding from Kickstarter. At the end of her undergraduate studies, she left the company to pursue medicine.

=== Other work ===
On March 21, 2014, Bose spoke on a panel, moderated by Bill Clinton, at a Clinton Global Initiative University conference held at Arizona State University, along with Jimmy Wales, John McCain, and Saudi Arabian women's rights activist Manal al-Sharif. The topic of discussion was "the age of participation" and the ability of an increasingly large number of citizens to "express their own opinions, pursue their own educations, and launch their own enterprises."

In 2018, she was featured by Microsoft on their advertising campaign for Windows 10.

She was included as part of the 2023 Forbes 30 Under 30 class in the Science category.

In January 2024, Bose was featured as part of Duke's Centennial Celebration Kick-off to commemorate the establishment of Duke University in 1924.

== Education ==
Bose attended high school at Fort Worth Country Day School, graduating in 2012. She attended Harvard College in Cambridge, Massachusetts where she was featured as one of the 15 Most Interesting Seniors by The Harvard Crimson. She completed her B.A. in Molecular and Cellular Biology in May 2016, and graduated with an MD–PhD from Duke University School of Medicine in 2023. She matched at the PSDP program at the University of Chicago Medical Center.
