= HydRON =

European satellite communication constellation project

- Operator: European Space Agency
- Status: Under development

Constellation size
- Current usable satellites: 0
- Website: https://connectivity.esa.int/archives/partnership-projects/hydron

HydRON, or High‑thRoughput Optical Network, is a future multi-orbit constellation of communication satellites using laser links, which is being developed by the European Space Agency (ESA). The project's goal is to provide real‑time large volume data transfer services between satellites and ground systems at throughput higher than 100 Gbps. The project is structured in three "elements". The first aims to establish a low Earth orbit constellation, the second aims to extend it to other orbits, and the third aims to create a user-facing segment in coordination with the industry. HydRON is part of ESA's Advanced Research in Telecommunications Systems (ARTES) programme.

== History ==
On 1 February 2022, ESA awarded a contract to the German company Mynaric to work on the optical communication system for HydRON. On 16 October 2024, ESA awarded a €36 million contract to the Canadian company Kepler Communications to lead Element #1 development. On 14 February 2025, ESA awarded a contract (amount undisclosed) to the European company Thales Alenia Space to lead Element #2. In early 2026, ESA awarded further contracts to Mynaric and Kepler Communications (€18.6 million) to work on Element #3.

== See also ==
- List of European Space Agency programmes and missions
- EDRS
- IRIS²
