= Author Solutions =

American self-publishing parent company

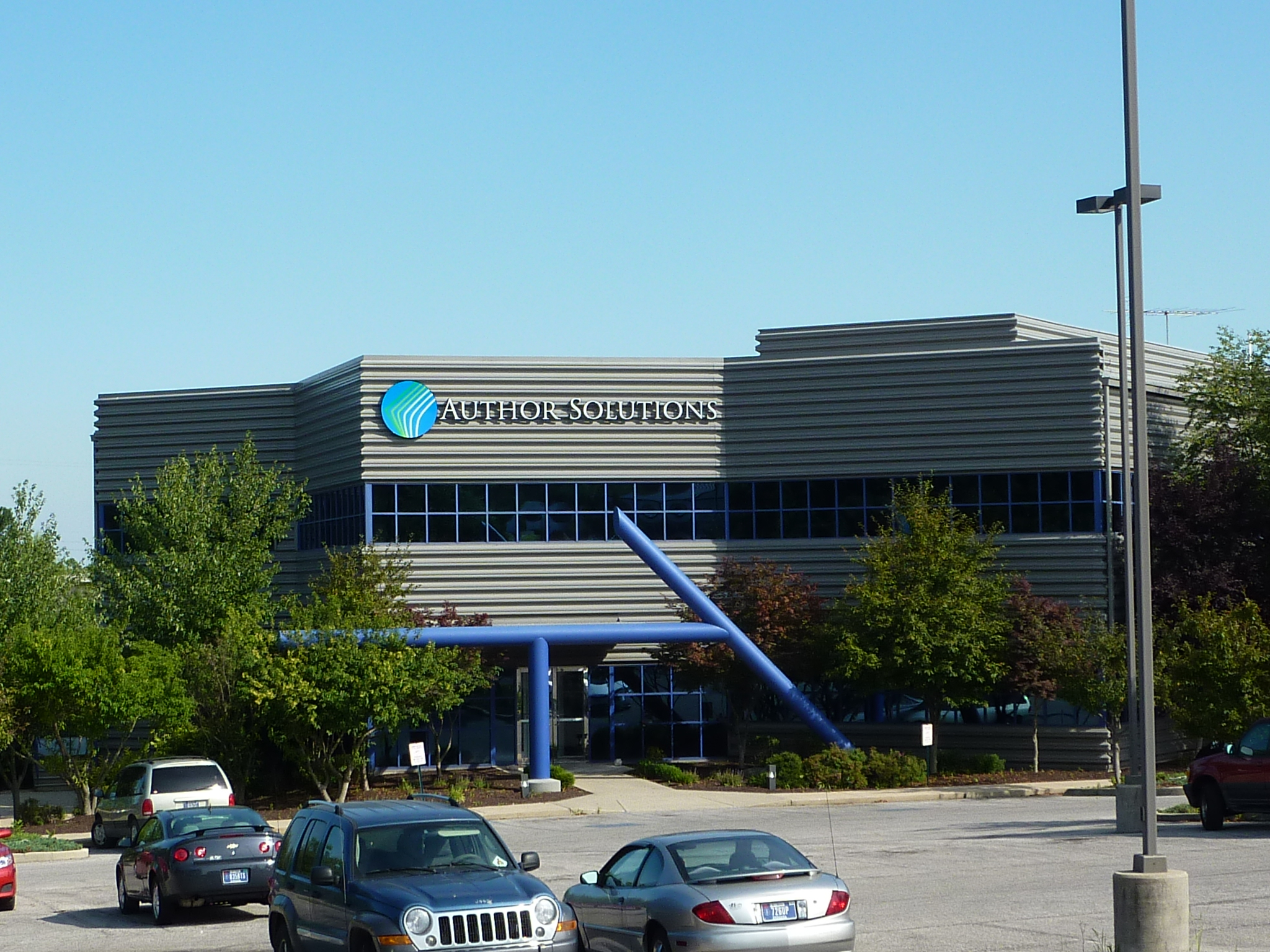
- Status: Active
- Founded: 2007
- Country of origin: United States
- Headquarters location: Bloomington, Indiana
- Key people: Jahm Najafi - Owner of Najafi Companies, Daniel Shum - Najafi Companies Partner
- Publication types: Books, eBooks
- Imprints: AuthorHouse, iUniverse, Trafford Publishing, Xlibris, Palibrio, Booktango
- Owner: Center Street Ventures
- Official website: authorsolutions.com

Author Solutions, LLC is the parent company of a number of vanity presses, including AuthorHouse, iUniverse, Trafford Publishing, Xlibris, Palibrio, and Booktango. The company is headquartered in Bloomington, Indiana.

== History ==
In April 2008, Author Solutions Marketing Director Keith Ogorek said that 1 out of every 17 books published in the United States is from AuthorHouse. In 2009, Author Solutions, acquired two top competitors – Xlibris in January and Trafford Publishing in April. Later that year the company partnered with leading Christian publisher Thomas Nelson to launch a first-of-its-kind self-publishing partnership, WestBow Press. In June 2010 Author Solutions launched its first Spanish-language imprint – Palibrio. Palibrio was initially offered only to the U.S. Spanish-speaking market, but later was made available to authors in Spain.

In 2012, Pearson (which also owns Penguin Random House) acquired Author Solutions from Bertram Capital Management for $116 million.

In 2013 Forbes magazine and Publishers Weekly reported that Author Solutions and its associated companies were being sued as part of a potential class action suit alleging deceptive practices. Damages of $5 million were sought. Publishers Weekly reports that the suit has been filed in the Southern District of New York. In July, 2015, the court denied class action certification to the suit, and in August 2015 the lawsuit was "discontinued without prejudice" after a settlement was reached between the parties. A second case was dismissed in September.

On December 31, 2015, Author Solutions, LLC was sold to Najafi Companies, and is no longer associated with Penguin Random House.

On March 7, 2025, it was announced that Author Solutions was purchased by Center Street Ventures. Based in Chagrin Falls, Ohio, Center Street Ventures "is a private investment firm focused on publishing, media, and marketing services."

In recent years, Author Solutions has formed partnerships with traditional book publishers to offer self-publishing imprints to authors: Simon & Schuster (Archway Publishing), Thomas Nelson (WestBow Press), Hay House (Balboa Press), and Guideposts (Inspiring Voices); as well as with Writer's Digest (Abbott Press).

== Criticism ==
Author Solutions is frequently criticized by author advocacy groups for predatory marketing practices, excessive fees, high-pressure sales, and poor customer service by Author Solutions and its subsidiary companies. These criticisms led to Author Solutions' inclusion in the Science Fiction and Fantasy Writers of America's Thumbs Down Publisher List, multiple Watchdog Advisories from the Alliance of Independent Authors, and alerts from Writer Beware.

== Imprints and divisions ==
- Archway Publishing
- Author Learning Center
- AuthorHouse
- AuthorHouse UK
- AuthorHive
- Balboa Press
- Balboa Press UK
- Booktango
- GABAL Global Editions
- iUniverse
- LifeRich Publishing
- megustaescribir
- Palibrio
- Partridge Publishing
- Partridge Africa
- Partridge India
- Partridge Singapore
- Trafford Publishing
- WestBow Press
- Wordclay
- Xlibris
