= Anushka Rajapaksha =

Sri Lankan scientist and scholar

- Born: Anushka Upamali Rajapaksha
- Education: University of Peradeniya; Kangwon National University
- Scientific career
- Fields: chemistry
- Institutions: University of Sri Jayewardenepura

Anushka Upamali Rajapaksha is a Sri Lankan chemist, university lecturer and research scholar.

== Education ==
She obtained a second upper-class grade in Bachelor of Sciences in Chemistry Special from the University of Peradeniya in 2008. She obtained a Master of Philosophy from the University of Peradeniya in 2012. She also received Doctor of Philosophy from the Kangwon National University, South Korea in 2015.

== Career ==
She currently works as a senior lecturer in the Applied Science Faculty at the University of Sri Jayawardenepura. During her career, she has carried out extensive research on various aspects including the development of novel engineered, designer biochar as the innovative solutions to the most pressing environmental concerns especially with the focus on remediating toxic heavy metals and pharmaceuticals contaminated soil and water, heavy metal dissolution and environmental remediation.

She along with other Sri Lankan scientists including Neelika Malavige, Meththika Vithanage, Dhanushka Udayanga and Asanka Sanjeewa were ranked among the World’s Top 2% Scientists in the 2021 List of outstanding researchers report published by the Stanford University.

She was conferred with the Prof Atta-ur-Rahman Prize from The World Academy of Sciences for the year 2022 in recognition of her contributions in chemistry. She also became the first Sri Lankan to claim the Pro Atta-ur-Rahman Prize and she was adjudged as the winner of the award during a virtual annual meeting at the Zhejiang University which was held on 21 November 2022.
