= Shumakov =

Shumakov (Russian: Шумаков) is a Russian masculine surname, its feminine counterpart is Shumakova. It may refer to

- Aleksey Shumakov (born 1948), Russian wrestler
- Marina Shumakova (born 1983), Kazakhstani table tennis player
- Valery Shumakov (1931–2008), Russian surgeon and transplantologist
