= Protium (disambiguation) =

Protium or hydrogen-1 is the most common isotope of the element hydrogen, with one proton, one electron, and no neutrons.

Protium may also refer to:

- Protium (plant), a genus of chiefly tropical American trees in the family Burseraceae, having fragrant wood
- Cadence Protium, hardware accelerated prototyping platforms for early software development by Cadence Design Systems

== See also ==
- Protonix, a commercial name for pantoprazole, a proton pump inhibitor drug
- Protonium, an onium, a proton-antiproton pair
