= Ann Makosinski =

Canadian inventor and entrepreneur (born 1997)

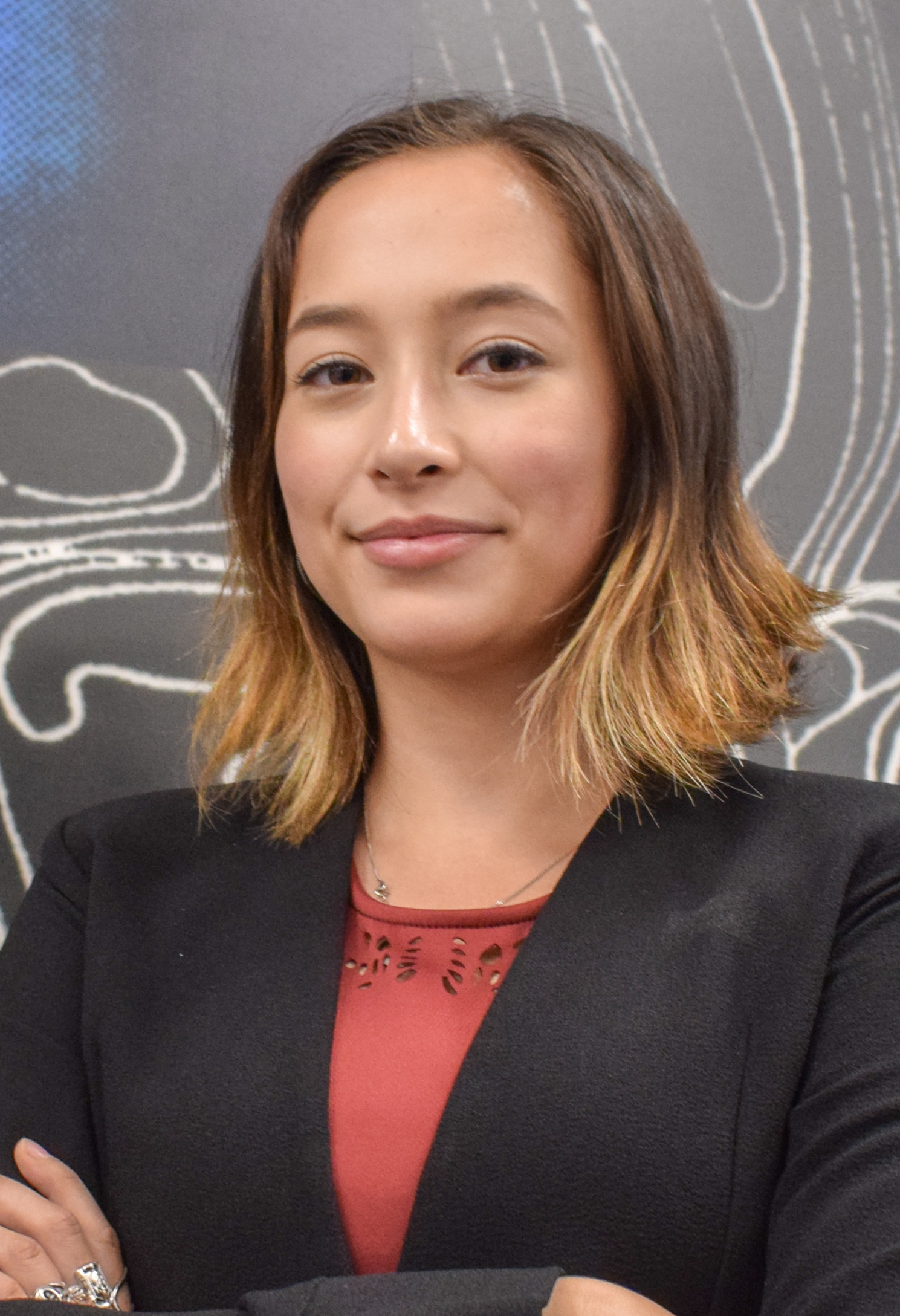
- Makosinski at Instituto Nacional de Educación Tecnológica, Buenos Aires, in 2018
- Education: St. Michaels University School; University of Victoria
- Known for: Inventions
- Awards: Google Science Fair; Intel International Science and Engineering Fair

Ann Makosinski is a Filipino-Polish-Canadian inventor and public speaker. She is known for her invention of the thermoelectric flashlight in 2011.

== Early life and education ==
Makosinski is of Filipino and Polish descent. Makosinski's family lives in Saanich, British Columbia. Her father is a retired lab manager with two medical patents. From a young age, she became fond of tinkering with different trinkets that she found around the house. One of her first toys was a box of transistors. She started soldering circuits by the age of 9. In sixth grade, Ann began competing in science fairs.

For her grade 7 science project, Makosinski invented a radio powered by the wasted heat from a candle. Two years later, she built a piezoelectric flashlight of her own design.

At 15, Makosinski decided to invent a light source that would not require any batteries and could be charged using the heat from the user's hand. In the end, she came up with the Hollow Flashlight, a first-of-its-kind renewable flashlight that did not require any changing of batteries or charging. Her inspiration for this idea came when a friend from the Philippines told her that she had failed a class in school because she did not have any electricity at home and could therefore not study at night. She ended up taking first place at both the Google Science Fair and Intel Science & Engineering Fair. She also showed her invention on the Tonight Show Starring Jimmy Fallon, gave three TEDx talks, and was on Time magazine's 30, Under 30, World Changers list all before she finished high school.

Makosinski attended the University of British Columbia from 2015 to 2018, where she studied English Literature. While at school, Makosinski became the face of Uniqlo's Heattech Fleece campaign and she also received the Sustainable Entrepreneurship Award. In 2019, Ann ventured away from her science domain of expertise and enrolled into the Herbert Berghof Studios school of acting in New York City. While in NYC Ann worked on a line of children's toys that ran on green energy, which were later profiled on CNN. She subsequently resumed her study of English literature at the University of Victoria from which she received her BA in 2021.

== Thermoelectric flashlight ==
In 2013, Makosinski won the Google Science Fair for her invention of the thermoelectric flashlight. The device relies on the thermoelectric effect using Peltier tiles. It is hollow to increase convection currents. In 2018 she was in negotiations to commercially manufacture and distribute the flashlight. She was inspired by her mother's homeland in the Philippines, where a friend failed a course because she did not have electricity to study at night.

In 2013, she presented her invention at TEDx Richmond and TEDx Vancouver and won a gold medal at the Canada-Wide Science Fair. Later that year, she appeared in a Time magazine article about influential people younger than 30 years old. In 2016, she was voted the Popular Science Young Inventor of the Year.

== The eDrink Coffee Mug ==
The eDrink Coffee Mug, Makosinski's second invention, was a coffee mug that used the excess heat of a hot drink while waiting for it to cool down and converts it into electricity. This electricity could then be used for a plethora of different things such as charging a phone, tablet, headphones, etc. The mug has yet to hit the commercial market. Similar to The Hollow Flashlight, this product is able to harvest residual thermal energy to create useful power. Makosinski was invited back on The Tonight Show Starring Jimmy Fallon to debut the eDrink. As a prize, The Tonight Show gave her $5,000 to support her education.

== Career ==
In 2016, Makosinski won a $50,000 investment from the Quest Climate Grant, supported by Canadian Geographic and Shell Energy North America for inventions powered by body heat. Later that year, she was appointed a global brand ambassador for Uniqlo.

In 2017, Makosinski was included on the Forbes 30 Under 30 list. She was also named one of Glamour magazine's 2018 College Women of the Year.

In 2018, Makosinski won four major awards from the Intel International Science and Engineering Fair.

Makosinski is the founder of Makotronics Enterprises and has filed several patents.
