= Xlibris =

Self-publishing and on-demand printing services provider

- Parent company: Author Solutions
- Founded: 1997
- Country of origin: United States
- Headquarters location: Bloomington, Indiana
- Key people: Bill Elliot
- Publication types: Books
- Official website: www.xlibris.com

Xlibris is a self-publishing and on-demand printing services provider, founded in 1997 and based in Bloomington, Indiana, United States. In 2000, The New York Times stated it to be the foremost on-demand publisher. The current president is Bill Elliot.

== Overview ==
Xlibris is a printing and distribution service that produces hardback and paperback books. It also publishes e-books in several formats. The company was acquired by a supported publishing company, Author Solutions, Inc., on January 8, 2009. Prior to that, 49% of the company had been owned by Random House.

In the same year, the company announced its expansion into the UK, Australian, and New Zealand markets.

The name is a derivation of the Latin term ex libris, which means "from the library of".

== Reception ==
In a New York Times article, D.T. Max stated that the quality of Xlibris's books was better than that of its competitors in the self-publishing industry, but criticized the organization of the site, where books were only indexed by an alphabetical listing by title with bare descriptions of the plot and theme. He ultimately phoned a company executive for a recommendation and to place an order.
