= Kenneth Oppel =

Canadian children's writer

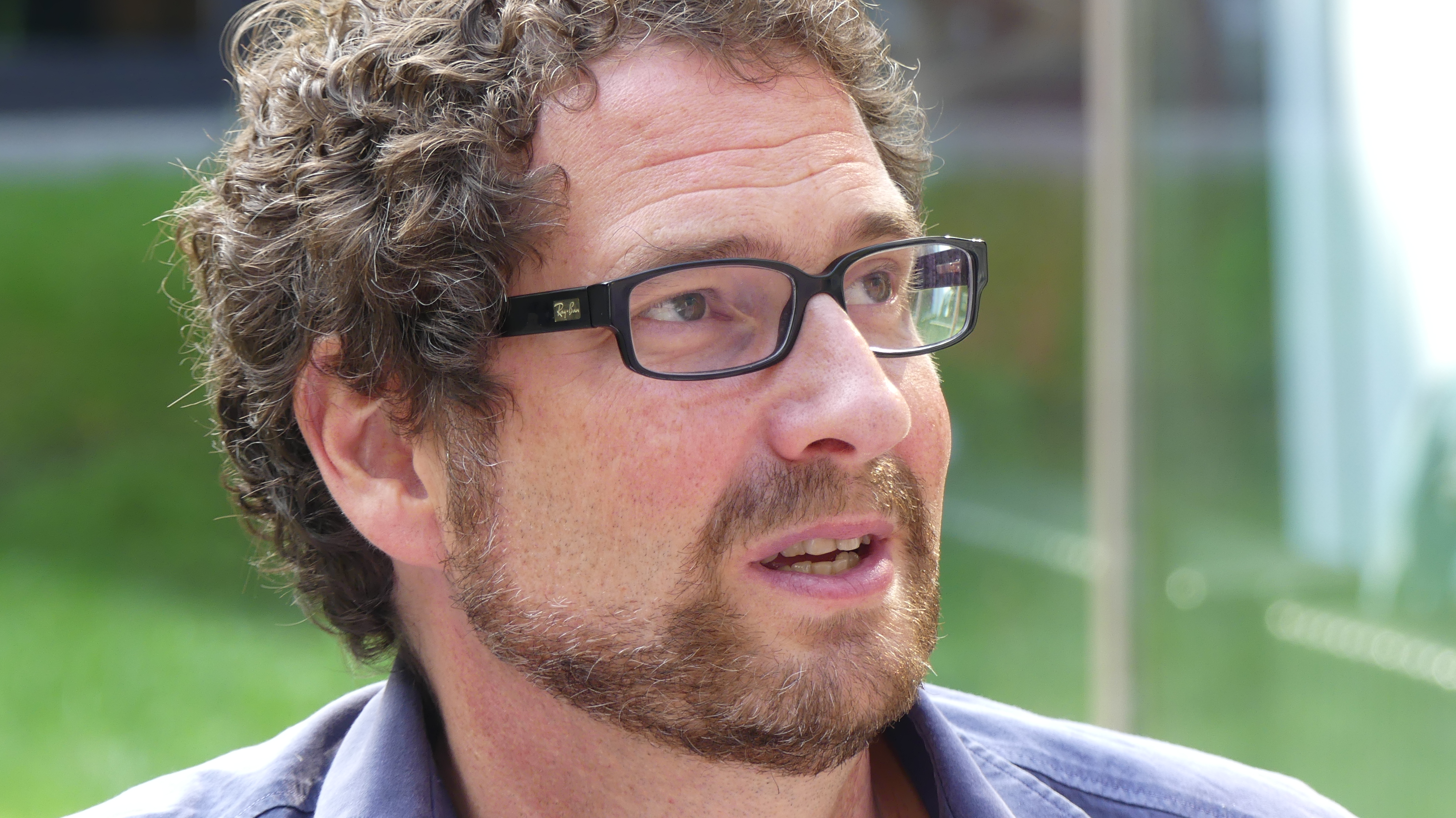
- Oppel (2016 at the Berlin International Literature Festival)
- Born: August 31, 1967 (age 59); Port Alberni, British Columbia
- Education: Trinity College, Toronto
- Occupation: Writer
- Spouse: Philippa Sheppard
- Children: 3
- Writing career
- Period: 1985–present
- Notable works: Matt Cruse series; The Silverwing Saga
- Notable awards: Governor General's Literary Award; 2004 Airborn
- Website: kennethoppel.ca

Kenneth Oppel (born August 31, 1967) is a Canadian children's writer.

== Life and career ==
Oppel was born in Port Alberni and spent his childhood in Victoria, British Columbia, and Halifax, Nova Scotia. He also lived in Newfoundland, England, and Ireland.

Oppel wrote his first book, Colin's Fantastic Video Adventure, while at St. Michaels University School. He forwarded the completed manuscript to a family friend who knew Roald Dahl, who in turn recommended it to his agent, and it was published in 1985.

Oppel received his Bachelor of Arts degree in cinema studies and English at Trinity College in the University of Toronto, writing The Live-Forever Machine (1992) during his final year. Oppel moved to England for three years and wrote a number of books during that period. From 1995 to 1996, Oppel worked as an editor at Quill & Quire.

He wrote four books for the Silverwing novel series: Silverwing (1997), Sunwing (1999), Firewing (2002), and Darkwing (2007). He has also written the Matt Cruse saga, including Airborn (2004), Skybreaker (2005), and Starclimber (2008); and the Overthrow series, including Bloom (2020), Hatch (2020), and Thrive (2021). Silverwing was adapted into an animated television series of the same name in 2003.

Oppel has won numerous literary awards, including the 2004 Governor General's Award for English-language children's literature and a 2005 Printz Honor Award (both for Airborn). Skybreaker was named a 2006 Best Book for Young Adults by the American Library Association). Oppel has received the Ruth & Sylvia Schwartz Children's Book Award six times (2000, 2005, 2006, 2008, 2011, and 2015) and has been nominated for the award one additional time (2026). He has also won the Young Reader's Choice Red Cedar Book Award for Fiction four times (2000, 2002, 2007, and 2024).

Oppel is married to Philippa Sheppard, a Shakespeare scholar and instructor at the University of Toronto.

== Selected works ==
=== Young adult fiction ===
- Half Brother (2011)
- The Boundless (2014)
- The Nest (2015)
- Every Hidden Thing (2016)
- Ghostlight (2022)

==== The Apprenticeship of Victor Frankenstein ====
- This Dark Endeavor (2011)
- Such Wicked Intent (2012)

==== Silverwing series ====
- Silverwing (1997)
- Sunwing (1999)
- Firewing (2002)
- Darkwing (2007); UK title, Dusk

==== Airborn series ====
- Airborn (2004)
- Skybreaker (2005)
- Starclimber (2008)

==== Other ====
- The Live-Forever Machine (1990)
- Dead Water Zone (1992)

=== Children's fiction ===
==== Barnes and the Brains ====
- A Bad Case of Ghosts (1993)
- A Strange Case of Magic (1994), or A Bad Case of Magic
- A Crazy Case of Robots (1994), or A Bad Case of Robots
- An Incredible Case of Dinosaurs (1994), or A Bad Case of Dinosaurs
- A Weird Case of Super-Goo (1997), or A Bad Case of Super-Goo
- A Creepy Case of Vampires (2002)

==== Overthrow series ====
- Bloom (2020)
- Hatch (2020)
- Thrive (2021)

==== Other ====
- Colin's Fantastic Video Adventure (1985)
- Cosimo Cat (1990)
- Follow That Star (1992)
- Cosmic Snapshots (1993)
- Galactic Snapshots (1993)
- Emma's Emu (1995)
- Peg and the Whale (2000)
- Peg and the Yeti (2004)
- The King's Taster (2009)
- Inkling (2018)

=== Adult fiction ===
- The Devil's Cure (2000)
