= Anushka Naiknaware =

Indian-American inventor, scientist and speaker

- Born: 2003 (age 22–23)
- Known for: Chitosan and Carbon Nanoparticle Based Biocompatible Sensor for Wound Management
- Awards: Winner in Google Science Fair (2016) First Place in Mathematics Broadcom MASTERS (2016) Minor Planet 33118 Naiknaware discovered by MIT LINEAR Lincoln laboratory is named after her Teen Vogue 21 Under 21 (2017) Honored OMSI Teen (2018) Research Science Institute, Center for Excellence in Education (2020)

Anushka Naiknaware, pronounced [əˈnʊʂkaː naːi:kanəʋərɛː] (born 2003 in Portland, Oregon) is an Indian-American inventor, scientist, and speaker. She is known for being the youngest person to win the Google Science Fair Award in 2016. Born in Portland, Naiknaware created a Chitosan and Carbon Nanoparticle Based Biocompatible Sensor for Wound Management smart bandage that alerts doctors when it needs to be changed.

In 2020 she was part of Research Science Institute (RSI) conducted by Center for Excellence in Education (CEE) which brings together top STEM talent from around the world. Since 2021 she is attending Massachusetts Institute of Technology as an undergraduate student.

She was awarded the Lego Education Builder Award. She also won the first place in Mathematics STEM Award at the 2016 Broadcom MASTERS competition. In 2017, she was honored 21 Under 21 at Teen Vogue Summit by Teen Vogue Magazine published by Condé Nast. A minor planet, 33118 Naiknaware, discovered by MIT LINEAR Lincoln laboratory is named after her.

In 2021 she was a State of Oregon Legislative Intern where she worked for representative Susan McLain. There she provided critical COVID-19 scientific analytics for decision making.

In 2017 she was invited to speak at TED Conference. As a TED Speaker , the talk was published in 2018. She is a speaker and advocates passion for innovation and STEM, especially for girls.
