= List of Florida Mayhem players =

Florida Mayhem was an American esports team founded in 2017 that competed in the Overwatch League (OWL). The Mayhem began playing competitive Overwatch in the 2018 season.

All rostered players during the OWL season (including the playoffs) are included, even if they did not make an appearance.

== All-time roster ==
Handle	Name	Role	Country	Seasons	Ref.
Adam	Adam Soong	Tank	Australia	2022	
Anamo	Taesung Jung	Support	South Korea	2022	
Apply	Damon Conti	Damage	United States	2019	
BQB	Sangbum Lee	Damage	South Korea	2019–2021	
Byrem	Seongjoo Lee	Support	South Korea	2019–2020	
Checkmate	Seunghun Baek	Damage	South Korea	2021–2023	
CWoosH	Johan Klingestedt	Tank	Sweden	2018	
DPI	Yong-jun Choi	Damage	South Korea	2019	
Fate	Panseung Koo	Tank	South Korea	2019–2020	
Gangnamjin	Namjin Gang	Support	South Korea	2020–2021	
Gargoyle	Beom-jun Lee	Tank	South Korea	2019–2021	
HaGoPeun	Hyeonwoo Jo	Support	South Korea	2019	
Hydron	Isaiah Rodriguez	Damage	United States	2022–2023	
Karayan	San-ha Choi	Tank	South Korea	2019–2020	
Kris	Junsoo Choi	Support	South Korea	2019–2020	
Logix	Andreas Berghmans	Damage	Belgium	2018	
Manneten	Tim Bylund	Tank	Sweden	2018	
MirroR	Chris Trinh	Damage	Vietnam	2022–2023	
McGravy	Caleb McGarvey	Tank	United States	2019	
OGE	Minseok Son	Tank	South Korea	2021	
RaiN	Jaeho Park	Support	South Korea	2019	
Sayaplayer	Jeongwoo Ha	Damage	South Korea	2018–2020	
Sideshow	Joshua Wilkinson	Damage	Great Britain	2020	
SirMajed	Majed Alrashied	Support	Saudi Arabia	2022	
SLIME	Seongjun Kim	Support	South Korea	2021	
SNT	Sunghoon Kim	Tank	South Korea	2018–2019	
SOMEONE	Jeongwan Ham	Tank	South Korea	2022–2023	
Swon	Sangwon Yoon	Tank	South Korea	2019	
TviQ	Kevyn Lindström	Damage	Sweden	2018–2019	
xepheR	Jaemo Koo	Tank	South Korea	2019	
Yaki	Jun-ki Kim	Damage	South Korea	2020–2021	
zappis	Joonas Alakurtti	Tank	Finland	2018	
Zebbosai	Sebastian Olsson	Support	Sweden	2018	
Zuppeh	Aleksi Kuntsi	Support	Finland	2018	
Xzi	Jung Ki-hyo	Damage	South Korea	2022	
KariV	Park Young-seo	Support	South Korea	2022	
Rupal	Rupal Zaman	Support	United States	2022-2023	
MER1T	Choi Tae-min	Damage	South Korea	2022-2023	
CH0R0NG	Sung Yoo-min	Support	South Korea	2023	
MAKA	Oh Eun-seok	Support	South Korea	2023	
WhoRU	Lee Seung-jun	Damage	South Korea	2023	
Sauna	Paavo Ulmanen	Damage	Finland	2023	

Last updated: 4 February 2024
