= Skybreaker =

2005 novel by Kenneth Oppel

- Skybreaker first edition cover.
- Author: Kenneth Oppel
- Cover artist: Kirk Caldwell
- Language: English
- Series: Matt Cruse series
- Genre: Fantasy, adventure novel, steampunk, science fiction
- Publisher: HarperCollins
- Publication date: July 20, 2005
- Publication place: Canada
- Media type: Print (hardcover & paperback); Audiobook
- Pages: 340 pp (first edition)
- ISBN: 978-0-00-200699-6
- OCLC: 59136517
- Preceded by: Airborn
- Followed by: Starclimber

Skybreaker, sequel to Airborn, is a young adult fantasy novel written by Canadian author Kenneth Oppel. It continues the adventures of young airship student Matt Cruse, and Kate de Vries, a budding scientist. Skybreaker won the 2006 Ruth & Sylvia Schwartz Children's Book Award for Young Adult/Middle Grade Novel.

== Plot summary ==
Using reward money from the discovery of Vikram Szpirglas' pirate base, Matt Cruse is attending the Airship Academy in Paris. While travelling through a storm in the Indian Ocean, his training vessel is caught in a vertical draft revealing a large airship drifting at 20,000 feet. Deducing that it is the Hyperion, a long-lost ship said to be carrying great riches, the captain steers towards it to attempt a boarding. However, Matt is forced to descend when the rest of the crew members are stricken with altitude sickness. Upon returning to Paris, Matt meets with Kate de Vries, his friend and object of affection, to discuss the Hyperion's billionaire owner Theodore Grunel. Kate announces that she plans to find "Grunel's treasure" using co-ordinates that Matt remembers in a special ship called a Skybreaker that will allow them to reach high altitudes safely.

Matt receives a request from a claimed descendant of Grunel. When they meet, the man reveals himself to be a criminal named John Rath and tries to force Matt to give up the co-ordinates. Matt escapes with a gypsy girl named Nadira who claims to have a key that works on the Hyperion and proposes her own plan to find it. Matt initially declines but changes his mind when he overhears a warm conversation between Kate and a wealthy acquaintance named Hal Slater. Matt and Nadira search for a Skybreaker named the Sagarmatha moored in Paris, but when they find it, they learn that Hal is the captain. Matt, Kate, Nadira and Kate's chaperone, Ms. Simpkins, hire Hal and his Sherpa crew to fly them to the Hyperion and promise Hal 80% of the gold they discover. Although Kate temporarily allays Matt's fears, he sees her develop an increasing rapport with Hal and becomes jealous. Matt begins to accept romantic advances from Nadira which culminates in a kiss between them in the crow's nest.

Matt brings his co-ordinates to Dorje, the First Mate, who factors in the wind speed to calculate the Hyperion's trajectory. This brings the Sagarmatha into "Skyberia", a cold and desolate area around the Antarctic. Dalkey, one of the pilots, traverses the outside of the ship to remove a rudder blockage and sees that it is a large squid-like creature. The creature electrocutes Dalkey with one of its tentacles and flies away under the propulsion of hydrium. Kate coins the term "aerozoan" for this species and observes more of them travelling the Antarctic skies. Mourning their lost member, the crew gives a night lookout shift to Matt when the Hyperion is closeby. He is unable to see it soon enough and the larger ship grazes the Sagarmatha, precluding the possibility of towing it. Kate chastises Matt for damaging the ship as their relationship continues to falter.

Hal, Kate, Matt and Nadira board the Hyperion and enter the vaults using Nadira's key. They find small pieces of taxidermy, which Kate carries back to the Sagarmatha, as well as some larger ones including the intact body of a yeti. In a room called the engineerium, they find a large key-activated machine that produces heat and a glass chamber housing the limp bodies of four aerozoans. No longer hiding that he has gone into debt, Hal raids the bedroom of the frozen Theodore Grunel and blows open his safe. When Matt tries to read a set of blueprints he finds in a canister, Hal angrily objects and sends the canister into one of the ship's pneumatic tubes. With Hal consumed by his lust for gold, the others read Grunel's diary and see frequent mention of a powerful enemy named "B". They dismiss this as a product of Grunel's diseased mind. The four climb out of the hatch but its connection to the Sagarmatha breaks under the wind and they are forced to spend the night on the Hyperion while low on food and oxygen reserves. Matt tries to comfort Kate but she lashes out and reveals that she knows about him kissing Nadira. Matt apologizes and Kate refers to Hal as "a bully", leading to a reconciliation between the two.

That night, the travellers learn that the machine they are using for heat is "Grunel's treasure"; a fuel cell capable of producing vast amounts of hydrium rather than gold. They realize that its design is inspired by the aerozoans in the adjacent chamber. While they search for the blueprints, one of the aerozoans comes back to life and breaks through the glass, forcing them to flee the engineerium. Before they can regroup, John Rath's airship, having pursued them all along, arrives and shoots down the Sagarmatha. From their hiding place, Hal, Kate, Matt and Nadira hear the ship being boarded by Rath's pirates and their employer Barton who goes by "B". Barton reveals that, as the head of the Aruba Consortium, he plans to maintain his monopoly by destroying Grunel's invention along with the blueprints. Before Barton can destroy the blueprints, the four of them split up and Matt is able to find the canister. After he places it in Hal's backpack, the pirates announce that they have taken Kate as a hostage.

Leaving Hal to tend to Nadira, who is suffering from altitude sickness, Matt sneaks into the engineerium and sees that the floorboards are concealing a fortune in gold bullion. Matt shoots the glass to free the remaining three aerozoans and escapes with Kate during the distraction. The aerozoans kill Barton and all of the pirates except for Rath who decides to scuttle the Hyperion before anyone can leave with the blueprints. As the ship explodes, Hal, Kate and Matt carry Nadira to the hangar where there is a pedal-powered ornithopter to facilitate their escape. Matt takes Hal's backpack in order to use the dynamite to blow open the hangar doors. Another explosion ejects the ornithopter from the Hyperion before Matt can climb aboard and he narrowly escapes with the help of a wingsuit.

The four make it back to the Sagarmatha having been repaired by Dorje and Ms. Simpkins. When they are unable to find Grunel's blueprints, Matt confesses that they were in the backpack Hal tossed to him. Hal berates Matt for not holding onto the backpack and not salvaging gold from the engineerium when he had the chance. He dismisses Kate's protests and says that her focus on pleasures other than money has ruined him. Matt and Kate excuse themselves and head to the hangar of the Sagarmatha. They soon find that their newly acquired ornithopter has a compartment on it holding 40 gold bars. Though intent on telling Hal, they decide to savour the moment first.

== Main characters ==
- Matt Cruse A young adventurous boy who finds the ghost ship Hyperion.
- Kate de Vries A passenger on the Aurora, Kate discovered the cloud cat, and is now looking for more specimens. She provides the money for the trip.
- Miss Marjorie Simpkins Kate's chaperone.
- Nadira Szpirglas A mysterious young woman, Nadira finds Matt so they can set up an expedition together. She provides the key.
- Dorje Tenzing A Sherpa member of Hal's crew on board the Sagarmatha.
- John Rath A man looking for money and hoping to take it from the Hyperion.
- George Barton An old rival of Theodore Grunel.
- Theodore Grunel A slightly eccentric inventor who sailed away on the Hyperion in order to escape Barton, Grunel is frozen on the Hyperion.
- Hal Slater Owner of the Sagarmatha, a skybreaker.

== Publication history ==
Skybreaker was first released in Canada in September 2005. It was shortly followed releases in the United Kingdom and the United States in September and December 2005, respectively. Below are the release details for the first edition hardback and paperback copies in these three publication regions.

- 2005, CAN, HarperCollins ISBN 978-0-00-200699-6, Pub. date July 20, 2005, Hardback
- 2005, UK, Hodder Children's Books ISBN 978-0-340-87857-6, Pub. date September 15, 2005, Hardback
- 2005, US, Eos ISBN 978-0-06-053227-7, Pub. date November 29, 2005, Hardback
- 2006, CAN, HarperCollins ISBN 978-0-00-639402-0, Pub. date August 17, 2006, Paperback
- 2006, UK, Hodder Children's Books ISBN 978-0-340-87858-3, Pub. date September 7, 2006, Paperback
- 2007, US, Eos ISBN 978-0-06-053229-1, Pub. date January 2, 2007, Paperback

== See also ==
- Airborn
- Starclimber
- Kenneth Oppel
