= Honda Silver Wing =

The Honda Silver Wing is a designation used for the following motorcycles:

- Honda GL500, a 497cc touring motorcycle
- Honda GL650, a 674cc touring motorcycle
- Honda Silver Wing 600, a maxi-scooter
