= Union of Independent People =

Union of Independent People Serikat Rakyat Independen
- Chairman: Damianus Taufan
- Secretary-General: Yoshi Erlina
- Founded: 2 May 2011
- Headquarters: Jakarta
- Ideology: Conservatism; Social conservatism
- DPR seats: N/A

The Union of Independent People (Indonesian: Serikat Rakyat Independen), abbreviated as SRI, is a dormant political party in Indonesia established on 2 May 2011 by supporters of finance minister and former World Bank managing director Sri Mulyani Indrawati who aspired for her candidacy in the 2014 Indonesian presidential election.

Sri Mulyani is the longest-serving female cabinet minister in Indonesia. She has been repeatedly included among the 100 Most Powerful Women list by Forbes magazine for years. In 2014, she was ranked as the 38th most powerful woman in the list, and by 2022, she was placed in the 47th. One poll in 2011 put Sri Mulyani among the top-10 most popular presidential candidates for the 2014 election.

== History ==
The party was established on 2 May 2011 in Jakarta by activists from Indonesian People's Solidarity for Justice (Indonesian: Solidaritas Masyarakat Indonesia untuk Keadilan, abbreviated as SMI-Keadilan). Among notable party founders are early New Order-era political activist Rahman Tolleng, lawyer Todung Mulya Lubis, and philosopher and former lecturer Rocky Gerung. The party's registration application was initially rejected by the Ministry of Law and Human Rights in 2011, forcing the party to appeal the rejection to the Constitutional Court on August at the same year.

After the Ministry of Law and Human Rights approved the party application, the party sought participation in the 2014 election. However, the party deemed not qualified to participate by the authority after failing in the administration verification phase in 2012. SRI leadership denounced the decision, suspecting it was politically motivated and insisted the party had fulfilled all administrative requirements.

Despite being aware a political party has been established on her behalf, Indrawati never conveyed any endorsement or commitment to support the party.

Following prolonged electoral vacuum, the party made the news in early 2022 when Rocky Gerung claimed the party he founded still exist at a dialogue with senior journalist at tvOne Karni Ilyas. At the same dialogue, Gerung said that he is ready to put forward his name as presidential candidate if the presidential threshold is abolished.

== Party executives ==
- Damianus Taufan
- Yoshi Erlina
- Susy Rizky
