= Tamil honorifics =

Honorifics of the Tamil language

In Tamil, honorifics (Tamil: முறை, muṟai) governs daily speech and register of both written and spoken communication. Traditionally, Tamil has been classified into two registers viz செந்தமிழ் (Centamiḻ) meaning 'classical' or 'pure ' Tamil and கொடுந்தமிழ் (Koṭuntamiḻ) meaning 'corrupt' Tamil. A huge feature of this difference is honorifics. Tamil honorifics usually are suffixes, although prefixes are not uncommon.

== General ==
=== Lexical choice ===
Lexical choice plays a vital role in Tamil society as depending on the choice of words, the register may alter.

| Literal meaning | Colloquial | Impolite | Standard | Official |
|---|---|---|---|---|
| to gorge oneself / to eat / to eat / to eat | கொட்டிக்க (koṭṭikka) | தின்ன (tiṇṇa) | சாப்பிட (cāppiṭa) | உண்ண (uṇṇa) |
| to sit / to sit / to sit / to get sat | குந்த (kunta) | உட்கார (utkāra), இருக்குற (irukkuṟa, SL Tamil only) | அமர (amara) | அமைப்பெர (amaippera) |
| to put one's head / to die / to lose / to be made time | மண்டையப்போட (manṭaiyaip-pōṭa) | சாவ (cāva) | இறக்க (irakka) | காலமாக (kālamāka) |
| / to speak / to speak / to speak | - | பறைய (paṟaiya) (SL Tamil and Malayalam) | சொல்ல (solla) | கூற (kūra) |
| / to talk reprovingly / to talk, to chat/ / to converse | - | பேச (pēca) (SL Tamil only), ஏச (ēca)(Some dialects) | பேச (pēca) (IN Tamil only), கதைக்க (SL Tamil only) | உரையாட (uṟaiyāṭa) |

Not all words in Tamil necessarily have a different colloquial, low, standard and high equivalents.

=== -n, -l, -r ===
Tamil nouns can end in ன் (n), ள் (ḷ) or ர் (r). ன் (n) and ள் (ḷ) are used to people of lesser social order to denote male and female respectively. ர் (r) is used as a form of respect to a person of higher social order.

Reflecting the importance of this ending, some Tamil castes have re-configured their caste names to end in /r/ rather than /n/, rendering them honorific.

=== Kār/Mār ===
கார் (Kār) is a singular honorific suffix to refer to a single collective noun. காரர் (Kārar) is a higher form of கார் (Kār). For example, கடைக்கார் (kaṭaikār) means 'shop-keeper' while கடைக்காரர் (kaṭaikārar) can be translated as 'honourable shop-keeper'. It is used to show and maintain a respectful distance in a relationship, as such is used to refer to stranger(s).

மார் (Mār) is a plural honorific suffix used to refer to a collective noun. மாரர் (Mārar) is a higher form of மார் (Mār). For example, அக்காக்கள் (akkākkal) means 'elder sisters' and is a plural, அக்காமார் (Akkāmār) means 'those honourable elder sisters' and is a collective plural while அக்காமாரர் (Akkāmārar) can be translated as 'those venerable elder sisters' and is also a collective plural. It is used to show respectful closeness or appraisal in a relationship, as such is used to refer to familiar person(s).

=== Ar ===
னார் (Nār), ஞர் (ñar) and யார் (yār) is an honorific suffix affixed after a noun to highlight its influence or importance. Its use implies that the noun is a collective singular. The rules to conjugate them are as follows: if the noun ends with ன், its ending would be னார் (Nār); if a noun ends with ஞன் (ñan), its ending would be ஞர் (ñar); if a noun ends with ஐ (ai) or இ (i), its ending would be யார் (yār).

For example, தகப்பனார் (takappanār) is more polite than saying தகப்பன் (takappan). தகப்பன் (takappan) means 'father', so தகப்பனார் (takappanār) can be translated as 'respectable father'. Other examples include நாயனார் (nāyanār), இளைஞர் (iḷaiñar), மூப்பனார் (moopanār), etc.

=== Ṭa/Ṭi ===
டா (Ṭa) and டி (Ṭi) are deictic honorific suffixes used to referring male and females respectively of a lower social order. A verb usually precedes it.

== Personal pronouns ==
The register of use can vary depending on the situation. For example, saying என் வீடு (En veeṭu) meaning 'my house' is considered rude even when if the house does not belong to the listener as it can suggest possessiveness. For the purpose of this article, the order of register descends from majestic > official > standard > low.

| Person | Tamil | Meaning |
|---|---|---|
| 1st | அடியன் (Aṭiyan) | I (low) (obsolete) It literally means I, who am your footstep. Usually used by devotees to refer to a deity. |
| 1st | நா (Nā) | I (standard) |
| 1st | நான்(Nān) | I (official) |
| 1st | யான் (Yān) | I (official) (Old Tamil); now obsolete. |
| 1st | யாம் (Yām) | I (majestic) (exclusive) |
| 1st | யாங்கள் (yāngaḷ) | We (exclusive) (plural) (majestic) |
| 1st | நாங்கள் (Nāngaḷ) | We (exclusive) |
| 1st | நாம் (Nām) | We (inclusive) |
| 2nd | நீ (Nī) | You (standard) |
| 2nd | நீர் (Nīr) | You (official) |
| 2nd | தாம் (Tām) | You (majestic) It literally means 'self'; and is used so as to not address directly. |
| 2nd | நீங்கள் (Neengaḷ) | You (official) (plural) |
| 2nd | தாங்கள் (Tāngaḷ) | You (majestic) (plural) |
| 2nd | உன் (Un) | Your (low) |
| 2nd | உம் (Um) | Your (standard) |
| 2nd | உங்கள் (Ungaḷ) | Your (standard) (plural) |
| 2nd | தங்கள் (Tangaḷ) | Your (majestic) (plural) |
| 2nd | நின் (Nin) | Yours (official) |
| 2nd | தம் (Tam) | Your (majestic) (singular) |
| 3rd | அது (Atu) | Third person gender neutral (low) |
| 3rd | அவன், அவள் (Avan, Avaḷ) | He, She (standard) |
| 3rd | அவர் (Avar) | Third person gender neutral (official) (respectful) (singular) |
| 3rd | அவர்கள் (Avargaḷ) | Third person gender neutral (majestic) (plural) (singular) |
| 3rd | அது (Atu) | It/That; (standard) when referring to an object (singular) |
| 3rd | அவை (Avai) | Those; (standard) when referring to an object (plural) |

=== Others ===
அவ்விடம் (avviṭam) which literally means 'that place', இவ்விடம் (ivviṭam) and which literally means 'this place' உவ்விடம் (Uvviṭam), என் இடம் (En idam) (my place) which literally be used to politely differentiate between three parties without explicating the difference.

வொய் / வோய் (woi) can replace a second person or proper noun in some southern dialects. It shows a lot of familiarity between the speakers. என்ன வொய்? (Enna voi) is a common phrase in districts like Madurai and Tirunelveli, and can be roughly translated as 'Wassup?'

=== Inclusives and exclusives ===
Tamil differentiates between inclusive and exclusive plural pronouns. எம் (Em) is an exclusive 'our' whereas நம் (Nam) is an inclusive 'our'. It is usually more polite to use the latter.

=== Demonstratives ===
Tamil third person pronouns referred above also act as demonstratives as the initial prefix அ "a" refers to the person at a distance as opposed to the same pronoun used with the prefix இ "i" which refers to the person at a relative proximity: அவன்/இவன் (Avan/Ivan); அவள்/இவள் (Avaḷ/Ivaḷ); அவர்/இவர் (Avar/Ivar); அது/இது (Atu/Itu); அவர்கள்/இவர்கள் (Avargaḷ/Ivargaḷ); அவை/இவை (Avai/Ivai).

== Titular ==
=== Tiru ===
Tiru (Tamil: திரு), also rendered Thiru, is a Tamil honorific prefix used while addressing adult males and is the equivalent of the English "Mr" or the French "Monsieur". The female equivalent of the term is tirumati.

Tiru is a word that means "sacred" or "holy". It is also a Tamil name for the deity Vishnu, who is called Tirumal (திருமால்), and his consort Lakshmi, who is called Tirumakal (திருமகள்) in Tamil. It also indicates "wealth", "respect", and "name" in Tamil.

The word tiru is a prefix of many city-names, such as Trivandrum or Thiruvananthapuram; Thiruchendur, Thiruvaiyaru, Thiruvenkadam, Tirumala, Tirupati, Tiruchirappalli, Tirukoilur, Tirukumaran, and Tiruvannamalai.

=== Selvan/Selvi ===
These are used to refer to unmarried people. செல்வன் (Selvan): is the Tamil equivalent of Master. செல்வி (Selvi): is the Tamil equivalent of Miss.

== Honorary ==
=== Avarkaḷ/Vāḷ ===
அவர்கள் (Avarkaḷ) and வாள் (Vāḷ) are honorific suffixes that affix after a noun. They are used to show respect to people of equal or higher social order. For example, ஜோன்-அவர்கள் (Jōn-avarkaḷ), ஐயர்-வாள் (Aiyar-Vāḷ). The அவர்கள் (Avarkaḷ) honorific can only be used in third person reference.

=== Kanam ===
கனம் (kanam) means 'weight' in Tamil. It is used as a prefix, usually to refer to a judge. It is equivalent to the English 'The Right Worshipful'.

=== Mānpumiku ===
மாண்புமிகு (mānpumiku) is a prefix meaning 'very respectable' and is equivalent to the English 'The Right Honourable', it is usually followed by a noun.

=== Aiyā/Yā ===
ஐயா (Aiyā) is an honorific suffix literally meaning 'Father'. It can be used to mean 'respectful' when addressing someone of equal or higher social order.

யா (yā) is a contraction of ஐயா (Aiyā), and is also an honorific suffix attached to a noun. It shows familiarity between the speakers, and can be a faux pas if not used properly. In this context, யோ (yō) can fully replace the noun.

=== Ammā ===
அம்மா (Ammā) can also act as an honorific suffix to show respect to an elderly or middle-aged female of higher social order. It can be equivalent to the English 'Mother'.

=== Amuni ===
அமுனி (Amuni) or அம்முனி (Ammuni) is an honorific suffix also equivalent to the English 'Lady', but restricted to young women or girls of higher social order. Its use is usually restricted to rural dialects where social order is much more defined.

=== Aṇṇācci/Aṇṇātai ===
அண்ணாச்சி (aṇṇācci) strictly means 'elder brother' and is a corruption of அண்ணா (aṇṇā). More often, it is used to address a leader of a gang. அண்ணாத்தை (aṇṇātai) with the same meaning and etymology is also used in some dialects.

=== Chellam ===
செல்லம் (Chellam) is equivalent to the English 'dear'. It can be used as a suffix to show endearment.

=== Kuṭṭi ===
குட்டி (kuṭṭi) literally means 'tiny'. It can be used as an endearing suffix while referring to children.

=== Maccān/Maccini ===
மச்சான் (machchān), or மச்சினன் (maccinan) in literary Tamil, is a title used to refer to a brother-in-law. Maccini is its female equivalent. Machchan, or its contraction Machchi can also be used colloquially between friends as an expression of familiarity or fraternity.

=== Mā/Pā ===
These contractions of ammā and appā can act as an endearing suffix in colloquial Tamil when referring to females and males, respectively, of a lower social order than self. It is usually preceded by a verb. For example, wā-pā is a more endearing and polite manner for an elderly person such as a mother to invite someone younger than themselves such as a son instead of simply wā.

=== Periyavar/Periyavanga ===
பெரியவர் (periyavar) means 'lit. he/she who is big' is used to refer to an elderly stranger. Although, technically it is gender neutral, it usually refers to men. While பெரியவங்க (Periyavanga) literally meaning 'they who are big' is used for women instead. However, it is not a faux pas to use kinship honorifics to strangers.

=== Piḷḷai ===
In some dialects of Tamil, it is common for adults to call young people or children பிள்ளை (Piḷḷai) or its contraction ல (ḷa) used as a suffix. பிள்ளை (Piḷḷai) means 'child' in Tamil.

== Ecclesiastical ==
These are titles used in clerical orders in Tamil. They may be religion specific or pan-religious.

=== Aiyar ===
ஐயர் (Aiyar) is a general title for 'priest' usually used to refer to Hindu priests. The priest in question does not have to belong to the Iyer community. It means 'father'.

=== Āyar/Pērāyar ===
ஆயர் (āyar) means 'shepherd' in Old Tamil, used by the Catholic and Anglican priests. பேராயர் (pērāyar) is Tamil for bishop.

=== Aṭigaḷ ===
அடிகள் (aṭigaḷ) is a pan-religious title used to denote priests or monks and is a Tamil alternative to the Sanskrit 'swami'. Notable examples include Ilango Adigal, a Jain monk who composed the Silappatikaram and Maraimalai Adigal. It means 'footsteps'.

=== Āḻvār ===
ஆழ்வார் (Alvar) is the title afforded to a celebrated group of twelve Vaishnavaite saint-poets. It means 'they who are deeply immersing themselves in devotion to divinity'.

=== Cittar ===
சித்தர் (cittar) were a group of saints that had achieved Ashta siddhi who founded the Siddha medicine.

=== Nāyanār ===
நாயனார் (Nāyanārs) were a celebrated group of sixty-three Shaivaite saint-poets.

=== Poocāri ===
பூசாரி (poocāri) is a title used to refer to priests of rural non-Agamic deities.

=== Turavi ===
துறவி (turavi) is a pan-religious title used specifically for monks or nuns, or generally those who have left worldly life for spirituality.

== Kinship ==
=== Āyā ===
ஆயா (Aaya) is a title which can mean 'grandma'. It is usually used for elderly maids, or wet nurse.

=== Appan, Aiyan, Accan and Attān ===
அப்பன் (Appan), ஐயன் (Aiyan), and அச்சன் (Achchan) have the semantic root meaning 'father'. However, they can be used differently depending on the context. Appan and Accan are usually used to refer to fathers. Attan can also be used to refer to a sister's husband, or simply endearingly by females. Aiyan or Aiya can be used to refer to scholars, or to show respect to a member of higher social order. They can all act as a suffix.

=== Ammā, Āttā, Ācci, Amman and Ammaiyar ===
அம்மா (Ammā), ஆத்தா (āttā), ஆச்சி (āchchi), அம்மன் (Amman) and அம்மையார் (Ammaiyar) all have the semantic root meaning 'mother', literally means mother. However, they can be used differently depending on the context. அம்மா (Ammā) is the standard register equivalent to 'mum', ஆத்தா (ātta) is a more familiar register, usually used in rural dialects, and is equivalent to 'mummy', and அம்மையார் (Ammaiyar) is the highest register equivalent to 'mother'.

அம்மா (Ammā) can also act as an honorific suffix to show respect to an elderly or middle-aged female of higher social order. It can be equivalent to the English 'Lady'.

ஆச்சி (āchchi) is an endearing and more familiar title for grandmother. Manorama, a veteran Tamil actress is affectionately known by this name. Occasionally, அம்மாச்சி (Ammāchchi), a portmanteau of the words அம்மா (Ammā) and ஆச்சி (āchchi) is also used.

அம்மன் (Amman), on its own or as a suffix refers to a range of non-Agamic folk goddesses. See Village deities of Tamil Nadu and Village deities of Tamils of Sri Lanka.

=== Tōḻan/Tōḻi ===
தோழன் (tōḻan) can be translated as 'comrade' or 'friend'. தோழி (tōḻi) is its female equivalent. A prefix மன (mana) can be affixed in front to mean best man and bridesmaid respectively. Cuntarar was known as 'Tampiran tōḻan' or Comrade of the Master. It is of high register, and as such is not used in spoken Tamil. Within the communist parties of India based in Tamil Nadu, members often refer to each other as தோழர் (tōḻar) regardless of gender.

== Occupational ==
=== Teacher ===
வாத்தியார் (vāttiyār) and ஆசிரியர் (āciriyar) both can refer to teachers. வாத்தி (vātti) a contraction of வாத்தியார் (vāttiyār) is a more familiar address to teachers, and is usually frowned upon.

=== Poet ===
புலவர் (pulavar) is the Tamil honorific suffix for poets. Notable recipients include Tiruvalluvar, Umaru Pulavar, Mayilvagana Pulavar and Kumaraswamy Pulavar.

Although, கவிஞன் (kaviñar) is also used, which is a prefix. A notable recipient is கவிஞர் கண்ணதாசன் (Kaviñar Kannadasan).

=== Orator ===
நாவலர் (nāvalar) is the Tamil honorific suffix for orators. A notable recipient is Arumuka Navalar.

== See also ==
- Sri
