= Google Science Fair =

International science fair

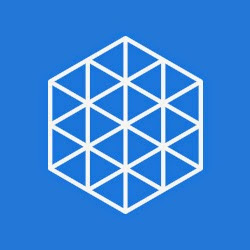
Official logo

The Google Science Fair was a worldwide (excluding Cuba, Iran, North Korea, Sudan, Myanmar/Burma, Syria, Zimbabwe and any other U.S. sanctioned country) online science competition sponsored by Google, Lego, Virgin Galactic, National Geographic and Scientific American. It was an annual event from 2011 to 2018.

The first Google Science Fair was announced in January 2011; entries were due on April 7, 2011, and judging occurred in July 2011. The competition was opened to 13- to 18-year-old students around the globe, who formulate a hypothesis, perform an experiment, and present their results. All students had to have an internet connection and a Google Account to participate, and the projects had to be in English, German, Italian, Spanish, or French. The final submission had to include ten sections, which were the summary, an "About Me" page, the steps of the project, and a works cited page. Entries were judged on the student's presentation, question, hypothesis, research, experiment, data, observations, and conclusion. Prizes were awarded to three finalists. The grand prize included a National Geographic trip to the Galapagos Islands, and a US$50,000 scholarship; finalists received a US$15,000 scholarship and assorted packages from sponsoring organizations.

== Guest interviews ==
The on-line site also contains a number of highlighted guest interviews with selected individuals, each well established and prominent in their field of science, with the aim being for them to act as inspiration to young students. The individuals chosen include Mitch Resnick, Spencer Wells, Kevin Warwick, and Mariette DiChristina.

== 2011 Winners ==
Shree Bose, a 17-year-old girl from Fort Worth, Texas, won the grand prize and $50,000 for her research on the chemotherapy drug, cisplatin, that is commonly taken by women with ovarian cancer, tackling the problem of cancer cells growing resistant to cisplatin over time.

Naomi Shah of Portland, OR, won the age 15–16 category with a study of the effects of air quality on lungs, particularly for people who have asthma. Ms. Shah recruited 103 test subjects, performed 24-hour air quality measurements at their homes and workplaces and had each blow into a device that measured the force of their breath.

Lauren Hodge of York, PA, won the age 13–14 category for research on whether marinades reduce the amount of cancer-causing compounds produced by the grilling of meat. She found that lemon juice and brown sugar cut the level of carcinogens sharply, while soy sauce increased them.

People around the world (90 countries) had the opportunity to vote for their favorite projects in Google's online voting gallery. Google has had more than 100,000 votes and the competition was highly competitive. Among the 60 semi-finalists, Nimal Subramanian received the highest number of votes and was awarded the People’s Choice Award. His project, Cancer Busters, received significant public support. As a result of this achievement, he was awarded a $10,000 scholarship.

== 2012 Winners ==
Brittany Wenger, who was 17, won the grand prize with her "Global Neural Network Cloud Service for Breast Cancer". Designed to noninvasively diagnose malignant cancerous tumors, it successfully detected over 99% of malignant breast tumors in a test set. She received $50,000, a trip to the Galapagos Islands, mentoring and internship opportunities for winning the competition.

Iván Hervías Rodríguez, Marcos Ochoa, and Sergio Pascual, all of Spain, won the 15–16 age group using microscopy to examine microscopic creatures in aquatic ecosystems.

Jonah Kohn won the age 13–14 group by designing and building a device designed to enhance the listening experience of those with hearing loss. His device attached to different parts of the body, translating sound into tactile stimulation.

== 2013 Winners ==
The winners of the 2013 Google Science Fair were:

13–14 age category: Viney Kumar (Australia) — The PART (Police and Ambulances Regulating Traffic) Program. Viney's project looked for new ways to provide drivers with more notice when an emergency vehicle is approaching, so they can take evasive action to get out of the emergency vehicle's way.

15–16 age category: Ann Makosinski (Canada) — The Hollow Flashlight. Using Peltier tiles and the temperature difference between the palm of the hand and ambient air, Ann designed a flashlight that provides bright light without batteries or moving parts.

17–18 age category Grand Prize Winner: Eric Chen (USA) — Computer-aided Discovery of Novel Influenza Endonuclease Inhibitors to Combat Flu Pandemic. Combining computer modeling and biological studies, Eric's project looks at influenza endonuclease inhibitors as leads for a new type of anti-flu medicine, effective against all influenza viruses including pandemic strains.

Science in Action Award & Voter's Choice Award: Elif Bilgin (Istanbul, Turkey) — Going Bananas! - Using Banana Peels in the Production of Bio-Plastic As A Replacement of the Traditional Petroleum Based Plastic. Elif invented a method to make a biodegradable plastic alternative derived from banana peels, offering an eco-friendly replacement to petroleum-based plastics.

== 2014 Winners ==
The 2014 Google Science Fair started accepting entries on February 12, 2014, and the entries closed on May 13, 2014. And the results for the local, regional and Science in Action award nominees were declared. The Grand Prize was won by three girls from Ireland, Ciara Judge (16), Emer Hickey (16) and Sophie Healy-Thow (17). They were the first group winners of the competition and the youngest winners to date (they also won the 15–16 age category prize). Their project was entitled 'Combating the Global Food Crisis: Diazotroph Bacteria as a Cereal Crop Growth Promoter.'

The 13–14 age category was won by Mihir Garimella (14) from Pittsburgh, Pennsylvania with a project titled 'Fruit-fly Inspired Robots.' Hayley Todesco (17) of Canada won the 17–18 age category with her project titled 'Cleaning up Oil Sands Waste.'

Along with the overall prizes for each category, a number of special awards were also announced. Kenneth Shinozuka (15) was declared as the Science In Action Award winner in recognition of the practical potential of his project 'Wearable Sensors for Aging Society.' Arsh Shah Dilbagi (16) from India won the Voter's Choice Award for creating an augmentative and alternative communication (AAC) device that converts breath into words, enabling mute people to speak. Local Award winners included Shannon Tan (18), who won the award in Singapore for his research on using treated materials from crustacean shells to purify wastewater from heavy industries.

== 2015 Winners ==
The 2015 Google Science Fair closed for entries on May 18, 2015, with regional finalists announced in London on July 7, 2015. These included Lauren McKenzie (14) who built an automatic soil watering system, Shadab Karnachi (14) who designed a low-cost gaming device for people with visual impairments, Nishanth Kumar (16) who designed a low-cost 'hands-free' mouse for use by people with developmental disabilities, and Peter He (14) who developed an innovative wireless virtual reality system.

The global finalists representing 10 countries were announced on August 4, 2015, and were as follows:

Bosnia-Herzegovina

Anela Arifi and Ilda Ismaili – A system for alternative fuel production and storage using chicken feathers

Canada

Isabella O'Brien – Trouble in Paradise: Recycling shell waste to reduce ocean acidification

Calvin Rieder – Extracting clean water from air: solar-powered solution for providing potable water

France

Eliott Sarrey – Bot2Karot: gardening through a smartphone-activated robot

India

Lalita Prasida Sripada Srisai – Absorbing water pollutants with corn cobs

Lithuania

Laura Steponavičiūtė – Detecting the environmental dangers of nanomaterials

Russia

Alexey Tarasov - Using ternary logic on current electronics

Singapore

Girish Kumar – RevUp: improving learning through auto-generated study questions

Zhilin Wang – Zinc air batteries for affordable, renewable energy storage

Taiwan

Wei-Tung Chen – Calculating the 3D position of an object from a single source

Yo Hsu and Jing-Tong Wang – Knock on fuel: detecting impurities in gasoline with sound pattern analysis

United Kingdom

Krtin Nithiyanandam – Improving diagnosis and treatment for Alzheimer's with new molecular "Trojan Horse"

Matthew Reid – The ArduOrbiter: a lightweight, open source satellite

United States

Anika Cheerla – Automated and accurate early-diagnosis of Alzheimer's disease

Anurudh Ganesan – VAXXWAGON: a reliable way to store and transport vaccines

Olivia Hallisey [WINNER] – Temperature-independent, inexpensive and rapid detection of Ebola

Deepika Kurup – Solar powered silver combating bacteria in drinking water

Pranav Sivakumar – Automated search for gravitationally lensed quasars

Adriel Sumathipala – Creating a simple diagnostic tool for earlier detection of cardiac disease

Tanay Tandon – Delivering rapid, portable and automated blood morphology tests

The winners were announced on September 21, 2015. The Grand Prize was won by Olivia Hallisey (16) with her project ‘Temperature-Independent, Portable, and Rapid Field Detection of Ebola via a Silk-Derived Lateral-Flow System’. The Google Technologist Award was won by Girish Kumar (17) for his project ‘Revup: Automatically Generating Questions from Educational Texts’ and the Incubator Award was won by Elliott Sarrey (14) with his project ‘Bot2karot: Manage Your Vegetable Garden via Your Smartphone’. The Lego Education Builder Award won by Anurudh Ganesan (15), the Virgin Galactic Pioneer Award won by Pranav Sivakumar (15), the Scientific American Innovator Award won by Krtin Nithiyanandam (15), the National Geographic Explorer Award won by Deepika Kurup (17) and the Community Impact Award won by Lalita Prasida.

== 2016 Winners ==
The 2016 Google Science Fair closed its entries on May 17, 2016, the Global 16 Finalist were announced on August 11, 2016. The final event took place during 24 to 27 September 2016 at Mountain View, California. Sixteen finalists competed for top five awards. The first two rounds had two age groups 13–15 and 16–18. However, unlike previous years, top awards during the finalist event did not distinguish between the two age groups of the previous rounds, thus making it particularly challenging event for the contestant compared to all previous years.

The Grand Prize was won by Kiara Nirghin (16) of South Africa for her project 'Fighting Drought with Fruit'. The Lego Education Builder award was won by Anushka Naiknaware (13) of United States, the youngest contestant to win a top award ever, for 'Smart Wound Care for the Future'. The National Geographic Explorer award was won by Mphatso Simbao (18) of Zambia. The Scientific Innovator Award was won by a team of three for 'Fighting Foam Waste with Recycled Filters' from the United States [Ashton Cofer (14), Luke Clay (14) and Julie Bray (14)]. The Virgin Galactic Pioneer award was won by Charlie Fenske (16) for 'Making Rockets more Efficient', also from the United States.

== 2017 Winners ==
The competition did not begin as usual in May, 2017. Starting from the late summer, the official website stated that "We're conducting some experiments" and "Coming Fall 2017". The submissions of competition in 2018 began on 13 September 2018.

== 2018 Winners ==
The Google Science Fair returned with 179 different prizes available for 2018–19. It opened for entries on September 13, 2018, and closed its entries on December 12, 2018. State award winners were announced in March 2019, regional award winners in April 2019, and global finalists in May 2019. On July 29, 2019, the top five awards were issued for students and one for an inspiring educator. The Google Grand Prize, featuring an award of a $50,000 educational scholarship, went to Fionn Ferreira, of Ireland. His project was titled "An investigation into the removal of microplastics from water using ferrofluids." The National Geographic Explorer award was won by A U Nachiketh Kumar and Aman K A, of India, for finding an eco-friendly way to coagulate rubber. The Lego Education Award was won by Daniel Kazantsev of the Russian Federation, who wanted to find a better way to help those who are hearing impaired to communicate with the world around them. The Scientific American Award was won by Tuan Dolmen of Turkey, who found a way to harness energy from tree vibrations. The Galactic Pioneer Award was won by Celestine Wenardy of Indonesia, for creating a low-cost and non-invasive glucose meter.

== See also ==
- Science fair
