= Starclimber =

2008 novel by Kenneth Oppel

- Author: Kenneth Oppel
- Language: English
- Series: Matt Cruse series
- Genre: Fantasy, alternate history novel, steampunk
- Publisher: HarperCollins
- Publication date: August 26, 2008
- Publication place: Canada
- Media type: Print (hardcover)
- Pages: 356 (first edition)
- ISBN: 978-0-00-200745-0
- OCLC: 213525892
- Preceded by: Skybreaker

Starclimber is the third book in the Matt Cruse fantasy series, written by Canadian author Kenneth Oppel.

== Plot ==
Matt Cruse is piloting an aerocrane for France's Celestial Tower where he narrowly survives a terrorist attack by the Babelites, a group of people who are opposed to humans reaching the heavens. After the incident, he meets with Kate de Vries, and is saddened to hear that Kate will soon return to Lionsgate City.

Canada's Minister of Air wants Canadians to be the first in space, and invites Kate to join the expedition as an expert in aerial zoology. Matt is offered a chance to become one of the world's first astronauts on board the Starclimber, under the command by Captain Walken, Matt's mentor from the Aurora. Matt decides to visit his mother and sisters. While he is there, he accepts a party invitation sent by Mr. and Mrs. de Vries. During the party, Matt is informed that Kate's parents will probably marry Kate to James Sanderson. Upon hearing this, Matt seeks out Mr. Sanderson during the party.

Matt is enrolled in the astronaut program and becomes friends with fellow astronaut trainee Tobias Blanchard. Three people are chosen to be the first astronauts, but Matt is not amongst them. When he leaves the room, Kate follows him to try and cheer him up. When she takes his hands, Matt finds an engagement ring on her finger. Matt leaves, heartbroken, and goes to a bar with the rest of the rejected astronauts-in-training. The other astronauts tell him that he deserved to be chosen. The next morning, Captain Walken tells him that one of the men they chose broke his leg, and offers Matt a spot on the space trip as a replacement. Matt accepts, even though the thought of seeing Kate again is painful.

During the journey, Matt discovers a letter from James Sanderson to Kate, leading him to believe that Kate really is preparing to marry James. That night, he tells Tobias his feelings for Kate, hoping that he can help him with his troubles. Tobias suggests that Matt propose to Kate. When he does, Kate attempts to change the subject, only to provoke Matt into claiming that she is lying to him about breaking off her engagement with James Sanderson.

A few days after Matt's failed proposal, the Starclimber is homebound. However, unexpected astral barnacles are discovered on the cable. The cable snaps, Shepherd is killed, and the Starclimber is left drifting in space with no way to return to the surface. The remaining members of Starclimber are left in orbit around the earth when Matt develops a crude but brilliant brainstorm using an emergency oxygen tank as a propellant and using the toilets' flush mechanisms as maneuvering jets, giving the crew only one chance to reenter the atmosphere. The beginning launch is successful, but Captain Walken is knocked unconscious, and Matt and Tobias are left as the only members of Starclimber's crew who are able to pilot her. Together with Kate and Dr. Turgenev, the four manage to guide the Starclimber into the first stage of reentry. While they are falling, Kate throws away her engagement ring and confesses her love for Matt. However, Dr. Turgenev reveals that everyone already knew, adding that it was "painfully obvious". The Starclimber, after a turbulent fall, successfully lands in Cairo.

Kate receives a telegram from her mother, saying that James Sanderson had eloped with another woman. Once Kate and Matt are alone, she apologizes to him. Matt then proposes to her again, using Sanderson's engagement ring, and she accepts, though they both know that getting Kate's parents' consent will be difficult.

== Publication history ==
- 2008, CAN, HarperCollins ISBN 978-0-00-200745-0, Pub date August 26, 2008, Hardback
- 2009, US, Eos ISBN 978-0-06-085057-9, Pub date February 24, 2009, Hardback
- 2009, UK, Faber & Faber, Pub date March 2009, paperback

== Reception ==
Sylvia Pantaleo of CM: Canadian Review of Materials gave the novel a "Highly Recommended" review and wrote that Oppel "provides enough background information about events and characters that the novel can be read independently of Airborn and Skybreaker." Kirkus Reviews stated that Oppel "has assembled intriguing characters, especially Matt’s fellow astralnauts, who populate a fast-paced narrative that features enough unpredictable plot twists to keep readers riveted to Matt’s story to the finish." Jonathan Hunt of The Horn Book Magazine praised the "action-packed" plot and "superb" characterisation.

== See also ==
- Space elevator
- Space exploration
- Space Race
- Martian canals
