= Silverwing (novel) =

1997 children's fantasy novel by Kenneth Oppel

- Author: Kenneth Oppel
- Language: English
- Series: Silverwing series
- Published: 1997 (HarperCollins)
- Publication place: Canada
- Pages: 255
- ISBN: 0-00-648144-2
- OCLC: 35977345
- Followed by: Sunwing

Silverwing is a children's novel written by Kenneth Oppel, first published in 1997 by HarperCollins. It tells the story of the Silverwings, a colony of silver-haired bats. Silverwing is the first installment of the Silverwing series, though it is chronologically the second novel in the sequence after Darkwing.

== Reception ==
Kirkus Reviews wrote: "Replete with appealing characters, scary adversaries, bat lore, natural history, unanswered questions, and conflicting theologies, the story takes on a promising epic sweep; readers will look forward to the sequels that Oppel's ending guarantees." Lauren Adams of The Horn Book Magazine Oppel has "created an intriguing microcosm of rival species, factions, and religions, and has left enough unsolved mystery to entice readers into the apparently planned sequel." Publishers Weekly wrote that the plot is "gripping, and details of bat life are inventively and convincingly imagined, though Shade's (and other bats') quasi-religious yearnings and struggles over tolerance, intellectual freedom and other abstractions get a little too much emphasis."

== Television series ==
The novel was adapted into an animated television series, shown on the Canadian cable channel Teletoon and previously shown on Toon Disney's Jetix. The episodes were combined to make three television films.
