= Achille Lauro discography =

Discography of Italian singer-songwriter Achille Lauro

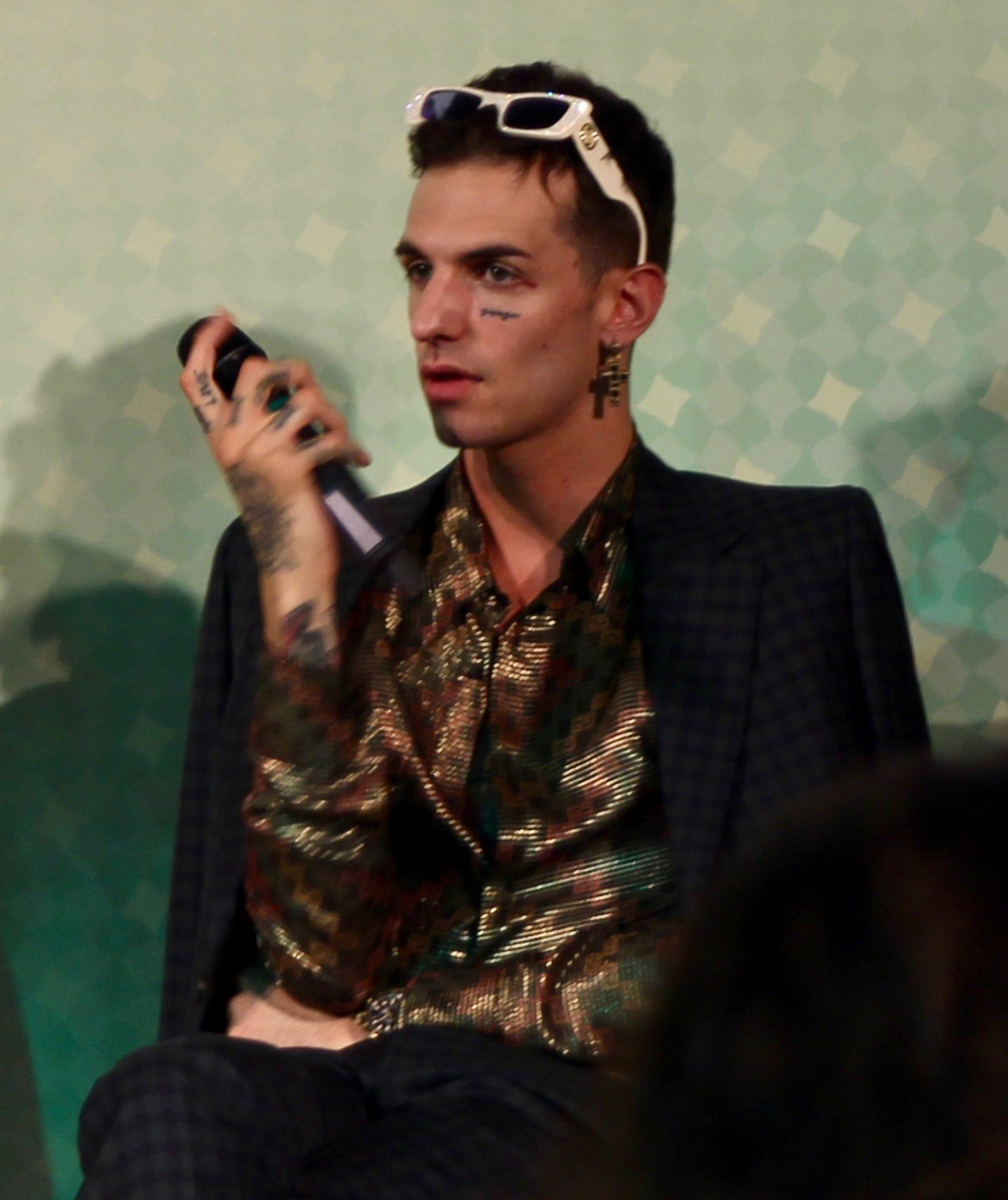
- Achille Lauro on 3 September 2019 at the Venice Film Festival
- Studio albums: 7
- EPs: 2
- Mixtapes: 2
- Tribute albums: 2
- Singles: 61

The discography of Italian singer-songwriter Achille Lauro consists of two studio albums, two of covers, two mixtape, two EP and sixty-one singles.

== Albums ==
=== Studio albums ===
List of albums, with chart positions and certifications
Title	Album details	Peak chart positions		Certifications
Title	Album details	ITA	SWI	Certifications
Achille Idol Immortale	Released: 27 February 2014; Label: Roccia, Universal; Format: CD, digital download	—	—	
Dio c'è	Released: 25 May 2015; Label: Roccia, Universal; Format: CD, digital download	19	—	
Ragazzi madre	Released: 11 November 2016; Label: No Face; Format: CD, digital download	22	—	FIMI: Platinum
Pour l'amour	Released: 22 June 2018; Label: Sony; Format: CD, digital download, streaming	4	—	FIMI: Platinum
1969 (re-issued as 1969: Achille Idol Rebirth in 2020)	Released: 12 April 2019; Label: Sony; Format: CD, LP, digital download, streaming	3	—	FIMI: 3× Platinum
Lauro (re-issued as Lauro: Achille Idol Superstar in 2022)	Released: 16 April 2021; Label: Elektra, Warner; Format: CD, LP, digital download, streaming	1	—	FIMI: Platinum
Comuni mortali	Released: 18 April 2025; Label: Warner Music Italy; Format: CD, LP, digital download, streaming	1	52	FIMI: 3× Platinum
"—" denotes a song that did not chart or was not released.

=== Cover album ===
List of albums, with chart positions and certifications
Title	Album details	Peak chart positions	Certifications
Title	Album details	ITA	Certifications
1990	Released: 24 July 2020; Label: Elektra, Warner; Format: CD, LP, digital download, streaming	1	FIMI: Gold
1920	Released: 4 December 2020; Label: Elektra, Warner; Format: CD, LP, digital download, streaming	13	

== Mixtapes ==
List of mixtapes, with selected details
Title	Details
Barabba	Released: 14 April 2012; Label: Honiro, Roccia; Format: Digital download
Harvard	Released: 17 September 2012; Label: Honiro, Roccia; Format: Digital download

== Extended plays ==
List of extended plays, with selected details
Title	Details
Young Crazy	Released: 28 April 2015; Label: Roccia; Format: Digital download

== Singles ==
=== As lead artist ===
List of singles, with chart positions, album name and certifications
Title	Year	Peak chart positions			Certifications	Album
Title	Year	ITA	LTU	SWI	Certifications	Album
"Giovani crimini" (featuring Read)	2010	—	—	—		Non-album single
"Vivo come fossi l'ultimo"	2011	—	—	—		Barabba Mixtape
"Il giorno del ringraziamento" (featuring Read)	2011	—	—	—		Barabba Mixtape
"Bear Grylls"	2012	—	—	—		Non-album single
"Motorini" (featuring Simon P)	2012	—	—	—		Harvard
"Scarpe coi tacchi 3 - La fine" (featuring Martina May)	2013	—	—	—		Genesi
"Bianco Natale" (featuring Rasty Kilo)	2013	—	—	—		Non-album singles
"Polanski"	2014	—	—	—		Non-album singles
"No Twitter"	2014	—	—	—		Achille Idol immortale
"Real Royal Street Rap" (featuring Marracash and Ackeejuice Rockers)	2014	—	—	—		Achille Idol immortale
"Scelgo le stelle" (featuring Coez)	2014	—	—	—		Achille Idol immortale
"Ghetto Dance" (featuring Gemitaiz)	2015	—	—	—		Dio c'è
"Bonnie & Clyde"	2015	—	—	—		Dio c'è
"Ora lo so" (featuring Marracash)	2015	—	—	—		Dio c'è
"Playground Love" (featuring Caputo)	2015	—	—	—		Dio c'è
"CCL"	2016	—	—	—		Ragazzi madre
"Teatro & cinema"	2016	—	—	—		Ragazzi madre
"Ascensore per l'inferno" (featuring Coez)	2017	—	—	—		Ragazzi madre
"Ulalala"	2017	70	—	—	FIMI: 2× Platinum	Ragazzi madre
"Amore mi"	2017	49	—	—	FIMI: Gold	Pour l'amour
"Non sei come me"	2017	35	—	—		Pour l'amour
"Thoiry Remix" (featuring Gemitaiz, Quentin40 and Puritano)	2018	36	—	—	FIMI: 2× Platinum	Pour l'amour
"Midnight Carnival" (featuring Gow Tribe and Boss Doms)	2018	90	—	—		Pour l'amour
"Ammò" (featuring Clementino and Rocco Hunt)	2018	59	—	—		Pour l'amour
"Mamacita" (featuring Vins)	2018	84	—	—		Pour l'amour
"Rolls Royce" (featuring Boss Doms, Frenetik & Orang3)	2019	4	—	—	FIMI: Platinum	1969
"C'est la vie"	2019	27	—	—	FIMI: 2× Platinum	1969
"1969" (featuring Boss Doms and Frenetik & Orang3)	2019	—	—	—	FIMI: Platinum	1969
"Delinquente"	2019	—	—	—		1969
"1990"	2019	49	—	—	FIMI: Platinum	1990
"Me ne frego"	2020	4	—	—	FIMI: 2× Platinum	1969: Achille Idol Rebirth
"16 marzo" (featuring Gow Tribe)	2020	9	—	—	FIMI: 2× Platinum	1969: Achille Idol Rebirth
"Bam Bam Twist" (featuring Gow Tribe and Frenetik & Orang3)	2020	19	—	—	FIMI: 3× Platinum	1969: Achille Idol Rebirth
"Maleducata"	2020	46	—	—	FIMI: Platinum	1969: Achille Idol Rebirth
"Jingle Bell Rock" (featuring Annalisa)	2020	—	—	—		1920
"Solo noi"	2021	36	—	—	FIMI: Gold	Lauro
"Marilù"	2021	54	—	—	FIMI: Platinum	Lauro
"Mille" (with Fedez and Orietta Berti)	2021	1	—	43	FIMI: 6× Platinum	Disumano (Fedez)
"Latte+"	2021	—	—	—		Lauro
"Io e te"	2021	—	—	—		Lauro: Achille Idol Superstar
"Domenica"	2022	10	—	—	FIMI: Platinum	Lauro: Achille Idol Superstar
"Stripper"	2022	—	83	—		Non-album singles
"Fragole" (with Rose Villain)	2023	7	—	—	FIMI: 3× Platinum	Non-album singles
"Stupidi ragazzi"	2023	64	—	—	FIMI: Gold	Non-album singles
"Banda Kawasaki" (with Salmo and Gemitaiz)	2024	80	—	—		Non-album singles
"Amore disperato"	2024	4	—	—	FIMI: 2× Platinum	Comuni mortali
"Incoscienti giovani"	2025	3	—	28	FIMI: 2× Platinum	Comuni mortali
"Amor"	2025	5	—	—	FIMI: 2× Platinum	Comuni mortali
"Senza una stupida storia"	2025	24	—	—	FIMI: Gold	Comuni mortali
"Perdutamente"	2026	9	—	—	FIMI: Platinum	Comuni mortali
"In viaggio verso il paradiso"	2026	42	—	—		Comuni mortali
"Comuni immortali"	2026	94	—	—		Comuni immortali
"—" denotes an item that did not chart in that country.

=== As featured artist ===
List of singles as featured artist, with selected chart positions, showing year released and album name
Title	Year	Peak chart positions	Certifications	Album
Title	Year	ITA	Certifications	Album
"Ragazzi del blocco" (Sfera Ebbasta featuring Achille Lauro and Boss Doms)	2016	—		Non-album singles
"Linda (Reloaded)" (Emis Killa featuring Achille Lauro and Boss Doms)	2018	—		Non-album singles
"Keanu Reeves" (Gemitaiz featuring Achille Lauro)	2018	16	FIMI: Platinum	Davide
"Ragazza di periferia 2.0" (Anna Tatangelo featuring Achille Lauro and Boss Doms)	2018	—		La fortuna sia con me
"Il mio D.J." (Subsonica featuring Achille Lauro)	2019	—		Microchip temporale
"La mala educaciòn" (Mattway and Uzi Lvke featuring Achille Lauro)	2019	—		Non-album singles
"Carillon" (Nahaze featuring Achille Lauro)	2019	55	FIMI: Gold	Non-album singles
"Dovrai" (Joey featuring Achille Lauro)	2020	—		Non-album singles
"Quella notte non cadrà" (Paolo Palumbo featuring Achille Lauro)	2020	—		Non-album singles
"Back to My Bed" (Elderbrook featuring Boss Doms e Achille Lauro)	2020	—		Non-album singles
"16 marzo" (Laura Pausini featuring Achille Lauro)	2026	—		Io canto 2
"Per noi" (Geolier featuring Achille Lauro)	2026	1		Non-album single
"—" denotes a song that did not chart or was not released.

== Other charted songs ==
List of other charted songs, with peak chart positions, showing year released and album name
Title	Year	Peak chart positions	Certifications	Album
Title	Year	ITA	Certifications	Album
"La Bella e la Bestia (Unplugged Version)"	2015	—	FIMI: Gold	Non-album single
"Maharaja (Remix)"	2018	—	FIMI: Gold	No Face Forever
"Purple Rain" (with Boss Doms, Gemitaiz, Frenetik and Orang3)	2019	43	FIMI: Gold	1969
"Cadillac" (with Boss Doms and Gow Tribe)	2019	94		1969
"Je t'aime" (with Boss Doms, Frenetik and Orang3)	2019	38		1969
"1990 (Back to Dance)"	2020	60		1990
"You and Me" (with Alexia and Capo Plaza)	2020	57		1990
"Sweet Dreams" (with Annalisa)	2020	33	FIMI: Gold	1990
"Summer's Imagine" (with Massimo Pericolo)	2020	56		1990
"Blu" (with Eiffel 65)	2020	71		1990
"—" denotes a song that did not chart or was not released.

== Guest appearances ==
List of album tracks, with chart positions and album name
Title	Year	Peak chart positions	Album
Title	Year	ITA	Album
"Alza il volume" (Lordinho featuring Achille Lauro and Sedato Blend)	2011	—	TNT Dynamite Mixtape
"Monopoli" (Balo1 featuring Achille Lauro)	2012	—	Paura pura Mixtape
"Metall" (Balo1 featuring Achille Lauro)	2012	—	Paura pura Mixtape
"Gotham City" (Sisco Baltimora featuring Achille Lauro e Sedato Blend)	2012	—	Gargoyle
"Aquila bendata" (Simon P and Crine J featuring Louis Dee and Achille Lauro)	2013	—	Full Coverage
"Transenne Pt. 2" (Simon P and Crine J featuring Read, Sedato Blend, Muggio, Gogna, Achille Lauro, Caputo and Dr. Frigo)	2013	—	Full Coverage
"Alla fine" (Simon P and Crine J featuring Achille Lauro)	2013	—	Full Coverage
"Soldi e paura RMX" (Rasty Kilo featring Chicoria, Aban and Achille Lauro)	2013	—	Dream Team
"Genesi" (AA.VV. featuring Corrado, Fred De Palma, Attila, Achille Lauro, Luchè, Marracash and DJ Tayone)	2013	—	Genesi
"Benedetti stronzi" (The Night Skinny featuring Achille Lauro e Tayone)	2013	—	Genesi
"Grimey" (3D featuring Chicoria, Aban and Achille Lauro)	2013	—	Top
"Forse c'è" (Deleterio featuring Achille Lauro)	2014	—	Dadaismo
"Crank" (DJ Gengis featuring Achille Lauro)	2014	—	Rome Sweet Home vol.1
"Notte da cafoni" (Fred De Palma featuring Achille Lauro)	2014	—	Lettera al successo
"Marmi neri" (Rasty Kilo featuring Achille Lauro)	2014	—	Molotov
"Ghetto Memories" (Luchè featuring Achille Lauro)	2014	—	L2
"La verità" (The Night Skinny featuring Achille Lauro, Luchè, Johnny Marsiglia and Pat Cosmo)	2014	—	Zero Kills
"Penso di me" (The Night Skinny featuring Achille Lauro)	2014	—	Zero Kills
"Indian tweet posse" (The Night Skinny featuring Achille Lauro, Egreen, Johnny Marsiglia, Ensi, Noyz Narcos, Chicoria, Louis Dee, Er Costa, Clementino and Rocco Hunt)	2014	—	Zero Kills
"Ci puoi riprovare" (Gemitaiz featuring Achille Lauro and Clementino)	2014	—	QVC5
"Don" (Marracash featuring Achille Lauro)	2015	—	Status
"Sua eminenza" (Blood Vinyl and Machete Crew and Slait featuring Achille Lauro)	2015	—	BV2
"Bed & Breakfast" (Saint featuring Achille Lauro)	2015	—	Hallelujah
"Rimmel" (Sedato Blend and Read featuring Achille Lauro and Chicoria)	2015	—	Blocco note
"Lo faccio bene" (Gemitaiz featuring Achille Lauro and Jack the Smoker)	2015	—	QVC6
"H.a.T.E.R." (Mr. Cioni featuring Achille Lauro and Boss Doms)	2016	—	8055
"Occhiali da donna RMX" (MadMan featuring Achille Lauro)	2016	—	MM vol. 2
"A me mi" (Gemitaiz featuring Achille Lauro)	2016	—	QVC7
"5.30" (Fred De Palma feat. Achille Lauro)	2017	—	Hanglover
"09/15" (Rischio featuring Achille Lauro)	2017	—	Per soldi
"Ballo del blocco" (OG Eastbull featuring Achille Lauro)	2018	—	La vita è bella
"R.I.P" (Noyz Narcos featuring Achille Lauro)	2018	22	Enemy
"Capitolo I - Drugstore Cowboy" (No Face R.Y.C.H. featuring Achille Lauro)	2018	—	No Face Forever
"Trap" (No Face R.Y.C.H. featuring Achille Lauro and Gow Tribe)	2018	—	No Face Forever
"Capitolo II - Bruce Robertson" (No Face R.Y.C.H. featuring Achille Lauro and Boss Doms)	2018	—	No Face Forever
"Battiato" (Gow Tribe featuring Achille Lauro and Doglife)	2018	—	No Face Forever
"Oe" (Boss Doms featuring Achille Lauro, Mattway and Uzi Lvke)	2018	—	No Face Forever
"La banda dello zoo" (No Face R.Y.C.H. featuring Achille Lauro, Boss Doms, Don Joe, Gow Tribe and Dogslife)	2018	—	No Face Forever
"Lager" (No Face R.Y.C.H. featuring Valè)	2018	—	No Face Forever
"Capitolo III - Addio alle armi" (No Face R.Y.C.H. featuring Achille Lauro)	2018	—	No Face Forever
"Capitolo IV - Tommaso" (No Face R.Y.C.H. featuring Achille Lauro)	2018	—	No Face Forever
"Maledetto lunedì" (Frenetik e Orang3 featuring Noyz Narcos, Shiva, Speranza, Guè Pequeno, Achille Lauro, Geolier, Lazza, Ernia, Side Baby and Taxi B)	2019	—	Zerosei
"Mai più" (Rocco Hunt featuring Achille Lauro)	2019	77	Libertà
"Mattoni" (The Night Skinny featuring Achille Lauro)	2019	—	Mattoni
"N.U.D.A (nascere umani diventare animali)" (Annalisa featuring Achille Lauro)	2020	—	Nuda
"Trap Emo RMX" (Gemitaiz featuring Achille Lauro)	2020	49	QVC9
"Identità" (Nerissima Serpe featuring Achille Lauro)	2023	—	Identità
"Crisi d'astinenza" (Rondodasosa and Artie 5ive featuring Achille Lauro and Dessy)	2023	—	Motivation 4 the Streetz
"Coming out" (3D featuring Achille Lauro)	2024	—	Empirìa
"Tony Montana" (Massimo Pericolo featuring Achille Lauro)	2024	—	Le cose cambiano Deluxe
"Non frenare" (Uzi Lvke featuring Achille Lauro)	2024	—	Solo
"Succo d'ananas" (Chiello featuring Achille Lauro)	2025	—	Scarabocchi
"Il limite" (Bresh featuring Achille Lauro)	2025	91	Mediterraneo
"Per te per sempre" (Tropico featuring Achille Lauro)	2025	—	Soli e disperati nel mare meraviglioso
"Arizona" (Irama featuring Achille Lauro)	2025	—	Antologia della vita e della morte
"Pazza idea" (Noyz Narcos featuring Achille Lauro and Sine)	2025	35	Funny Games
"+ a nulla" (Capo Plaza featuring Achille Lauro)	2026	—	4U EP
"—" denotes a song that did not chart or was not released.
