= Celeste Dalla Porta =

Italian actress (born 1997)

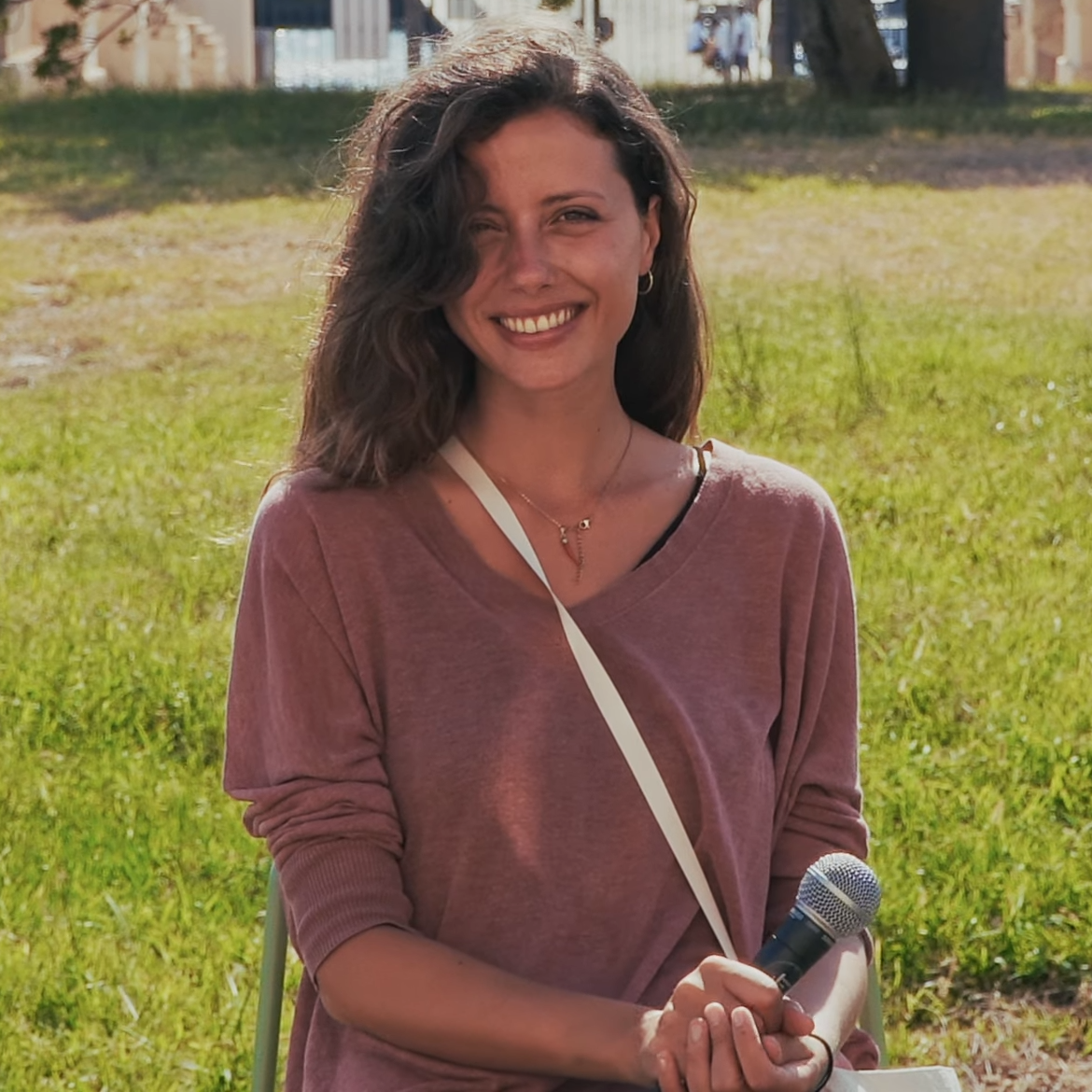
- Born: 24 December 1997 (age 28); Monza, Italy
- Occupation: Actress
- Years active: 2020–present

Celeste Dalla Porta (born 24 December 1997) is an Italian actress. She gained critical recognition for her role as the protagonist in Paolo Sorrentino's 2024 film Parthenope.

== Biography ==
Dalla Porta was born on 24 December 1997 in Monza, Lombardy, Italy. She is the granddaughter of photographer Ugo Mulas and the daughter of jazz double bassist Paolino Dalla Porta. In 2017, she graduated from the Brera Art High School. In 2019, she moved to Rome and attended the Centro Sperimentale di Cinematografia (Experimental Center of Cinematography), where she earned her acting diploma.

While still a student, Dalla Porta appeared in a scene in the 2020 film The Hand of God, but her scene was cut during editing. In 2021 and 2022, she appeared in several short films, notably starring as Sofia in the short film series Red Mirror (2022). She made her feature film debut in 2020 in Who’s Afraid of Dr. Kramer and gained prominence in 2024 by starring in Parthenope, directed by Paolo Sorrentino, after which she won the David di Donatello for Italian Rising Stars.

In 2025, Dalla Porta was featured in Achille Lauro's "Incoscienti giovani" music video.

== Filmography ==
=== Films ===
| Year | Title | Role | Notes |
|---|---|---|---|
| 2020 | Next One | Number Six | Short |
| 2020 | Who’s Afraid of Dr. Kramer | Bit | |
| 2024 | Parthenope | Parthenope | Main role |

=== Television ===
| Year | Title | Role | Notes |
|---|---|---|---|
| 2022 | Red Mirror | Sofia | Main role |

=== Music video ===
| Year | Title | Artist | Director |
|---|---|---|---|
| 2025 | "Incoscienti giovani" | Achille Lauro | Gabriele Savino |
