= 2026 Winter Olympics closing ceremony =

- Part of 2026 Winter Olympics
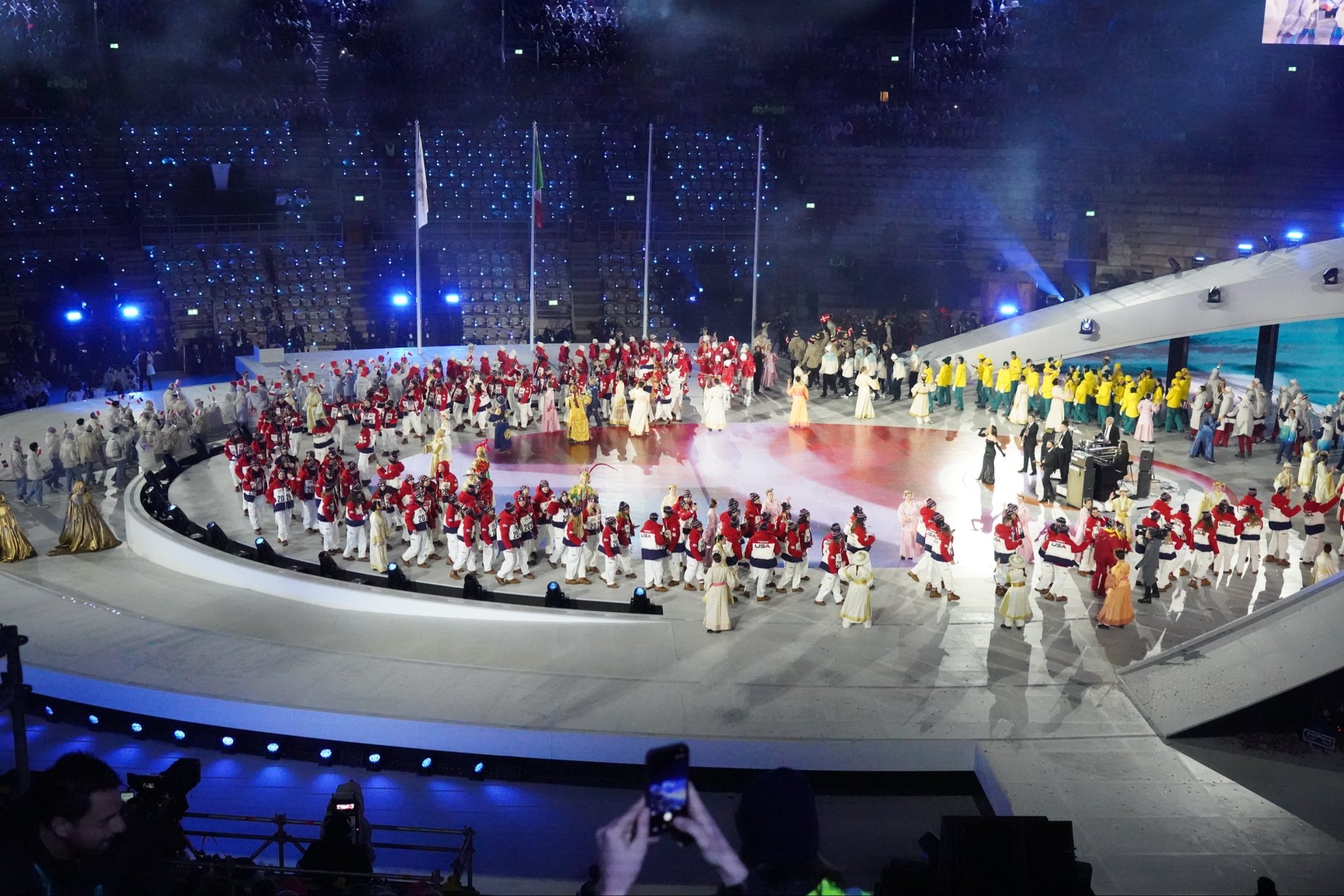
- Parade of flag bearers and athletes
- Date: 22 February 2026; 8 months ago
- Time: 20:30–23:00 CET (UTC+1)
- Venue: Verona Arena (main); Teatro Filarmonico (secondary)
- Location: Verona, Italy
- Also known as: Beauty in Action
- Filmed by: Olympic Broadcasting Services (OBS)
- Footage: 2026 Winter Olympics Closing Ceremony in Olympic Channel on YouTube

The 2026 Winter Olympics closing ceremony took place on 22 February 2026. It started at 20:30 CET (19:30 UTC) and concluded at 23:00. Entitled "Beauty in Action", the ceremony was held at the Verona Arena in Verona, Italy.

As mandated by the Olympic Charter, the proceedings combine the protocol-related and cultural segments. It is the first Olympics Games closing ceremony under the IOC presidency of Kirsty Coventry.

The city of Verona was chosen to host the ceremony, even though no events were scheduled to take place there: the intention was for this ceremony to be held in a setting reminiscent of the ancient Olympic Games. The ancient Roman amphitheater, which regularly hosts a famous open-air opera festival as well as other cultural events, also hosted the opening ceremony of the 2026 Winter Paralympics on 6 March. The Teatro Filarmonico, an opera theatre in Verona, served as a secondary venue.

== Preparations ==
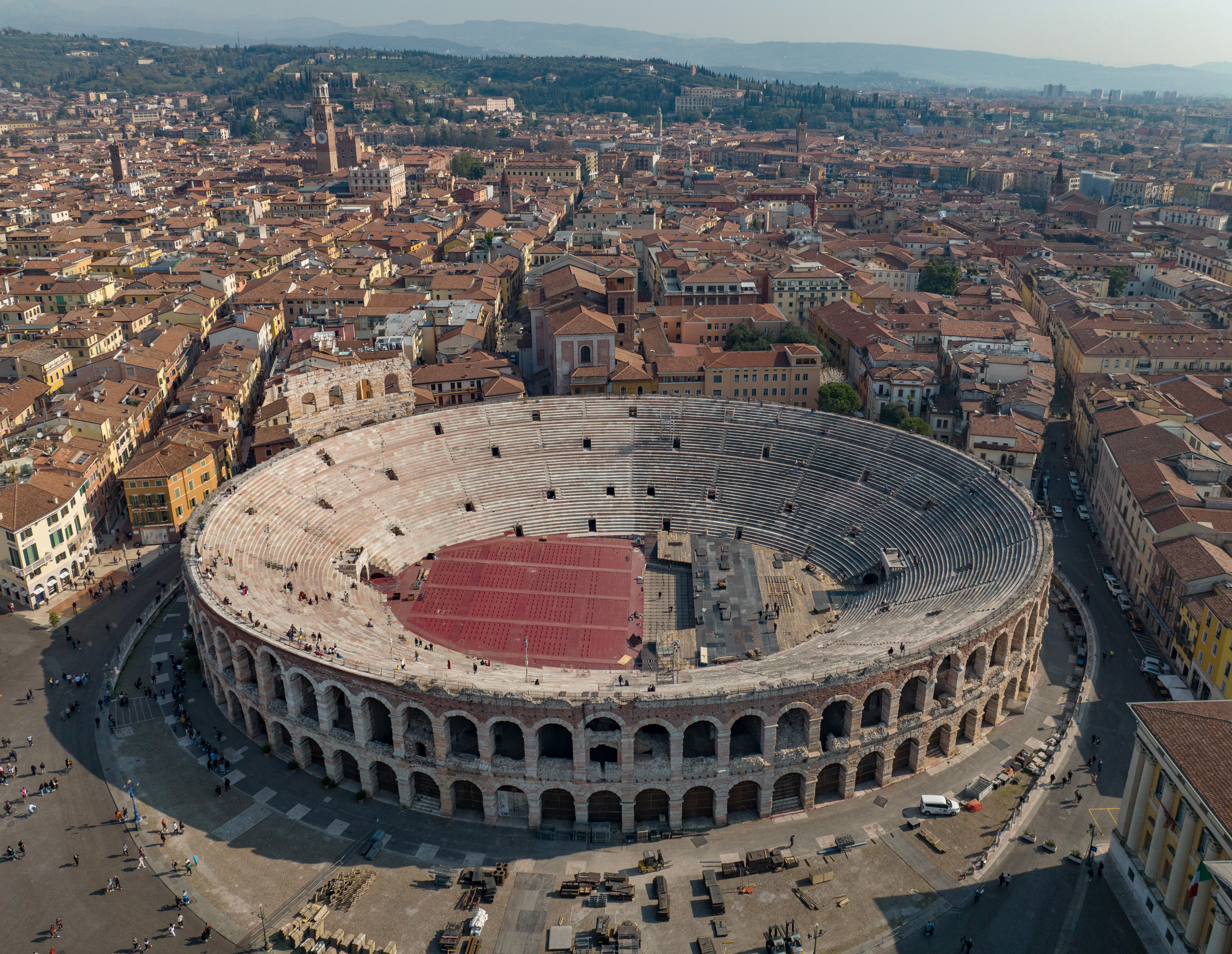
The Verona Arena in Verona, Italy hosted the closing ceremony.

The closing ceremony was filmed by Olympic Broadcasting Services (OBS) and broadcast by International Olympic Committee's (IOC) Global Media rights holders.

The creative team for the ceremony was produced by Filmmaster Group guided by Alfredo Accatino, with the team consisting of Adriano Martella (creative director), Stefania Opipari (show director), Stefano Ciammitti (costume designer), Vittorio Cosma (music director), Michele Braga (music director) and Claudio Santucci (set designer).

The Olympians staying in the Milan Olympic Village traveled by train from Milan to Verona.

== Proceedings ==
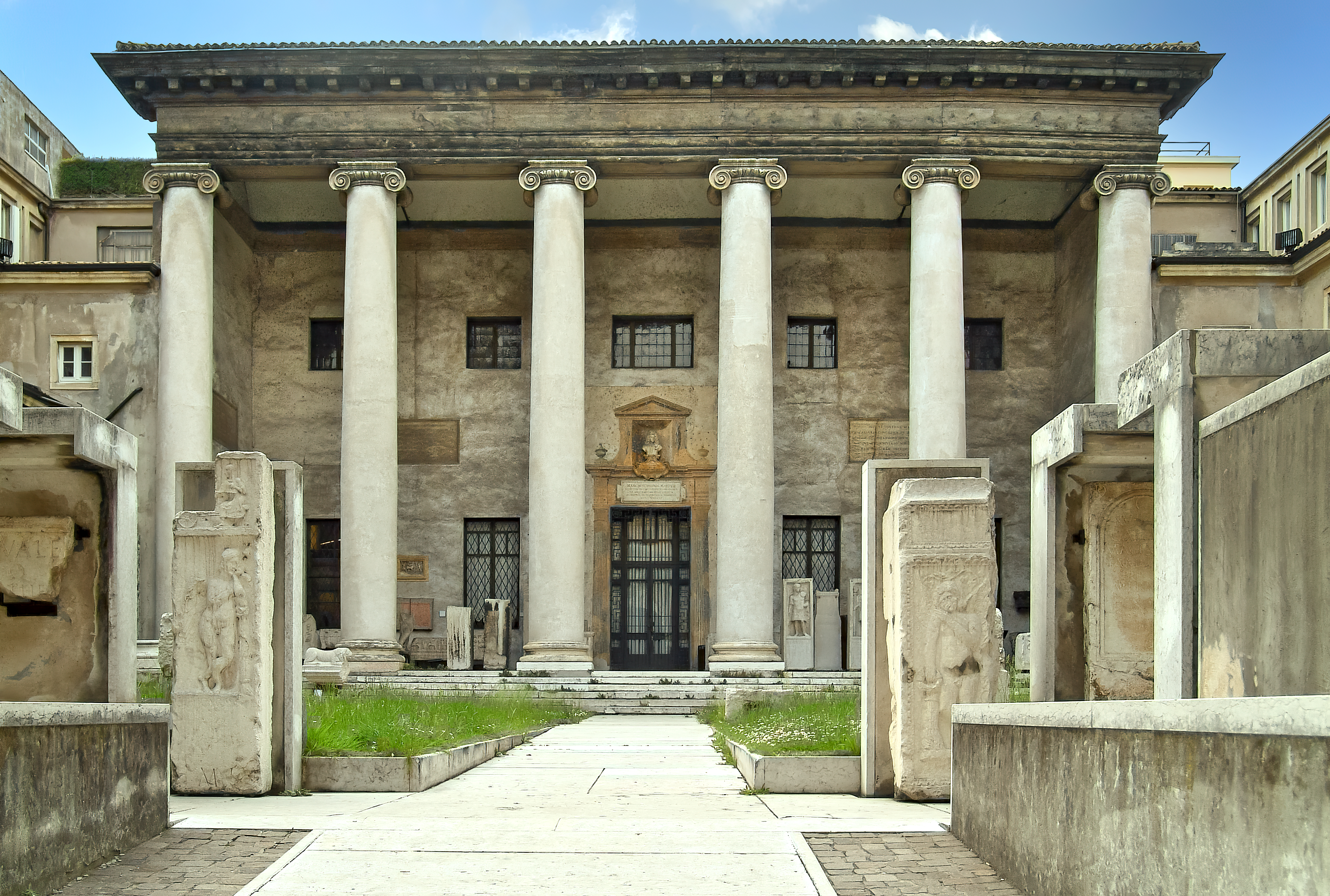
Exterior of the Teatro Filarmonico in Verona

The closing ceremony was held at the Verona Arena and started at 20:30 (CET) in Verona, Italy. It began with a segment entitled "A Night at the Opera," which serves as a tribute to Italian opera. During the segment, a lumière illuminated multiple candelabras on a constructed stage in the middle of the arena, with a camera following the stage director (portrayed by Francesco Pannofino) behind the stage into underground tunnels beneath the arena, where he prepared the rehearsal for the performance during a pre-recorded segment. The segment featured characters from various Italian operas, including the eponymous protagonists of Rigoletto (portrayed by Italian actor Stefano Scandaletti) and of Aida (portrayed by Nigerian former model Charity Dago), Alfredo (portrayed by Italian tenor Vincenzo Costanzo) and Violetta (portrayed by Bolivian-Albanian soprano Carolina Lopez Moreno) from La traviata, Figaro (portrayed by Italian musician Antonio Melissa) from Il barbiere di Siviglia, and Cio-Cio San (portrayed by Japanese-Italian actress Jun Ichikawa) from Madama Butterfly, with performers wearing extravagant costumes made using recycled materials. The segment also featured cameos from famous Italians, including Achille Lauro, Deborah Compagnoni, and a brief appearance of Juliet on her balcony. As Rigoletto emerged from a large chandelier that appeared above the stage, Alfredo and Violetta performed "Libiamo ne' lieti calici" before Aida and Cio-Cio San took the stage. Meanwhile, the lumière escorted Italian opera's characters paraded with the athletes through Piazza Bra in Verona while making their way into the arena. At the same time, the choir sang from the Teatro Filarmonico, which served as a secondary venue for the ceremony with an audience, including actress Benedetta Porcaroli.

After an artistic program, a short segment titled "Faces of Italy" showed portraits of various Italians captured by photographer Marco Delogu. After the seating of the dignitaries, Paolo Fresu and the choir of the Fondazione Arena di Verona performed "Il Canto degli Italiani" during the raising of the flag of Italy; the flag itself was carried by people from the host sites of the games and the Carabinieri. Italian athletes who won medals at the Games stood on stage during the flag raising. Afterward, Italian athletes Silvio Fauner, Maurilio De Zolt, Marco Albarello, and Giorgio Vanzetta (members of the winning Cross-country skiing at the 1994 Winter Olympics – Men's 4 × 10 kilometre relay team) appeared with the Olympic flame in an ampoule; this led to the illumination of the Olympic rings inside the arena.

After the flags of the competing nations arrived in the arena, the athletes followed. During the athletes' parade, Margherita Vicario, Davide Shorty, and Calibro 35 performed on stage. This was followed by the Elevation segment, which featured an acrobatic performance representing athletes and a victory ceremony for the medalists from Cross-country skiing – Men's 50 kilometre classical and Cross-country skiing – Women's 50 kilometre classical. Gabry Ponte and Eiffel 65 performed Blue (Da Ba Dee) during a tribute to the Games' volunteers, which was followed by a moment of remembrance segment featuring the orchestra of the Fondazione Arena plays Puccini's "Humming Chorus" while Cio-Cio San gazing at the butterflies.

With various references to the water cycle and sunlight, Italian singer Joan Thiele sings "Il mondo" while La Scala Theatre Ballet's Roberto Bolle performs an aerial tribute to Earth. Afterward, the choir and orchestra of the Fondazione Arena di Verona performed the Olympic Hymn during the lowering of the Olympic flag. Shortly before, "Hymn to Liberty" (the national anthem of Greece) was performed during its flag raising. The mayors of Milan and Cortina d'Ampezzo handed over the flag to the presidents of the regional councils of Provence-Alpes-Côte d'Azur and Auvergne-Rhône-Alpes, the host regions of the 2030 Winter Olympics. This was followed by the raising of the flag of France and a performance of "La Marseillaise" by Marine Chagnon, with a musical arrangement by Thomas Roussel. During the performance, French athletes at the Games appeared; this was followed by a video from the French Alps, with references to light and "a new dawn". The Olympic Flag will be raised again on 14 July 2028, for the opening ceremony of the 2028 Summer Olympics at Los Angeles Memorial Coliseum and SoFi Stadium in Los Angeles.

Milano Cortina 2026 organising committee president Giovanni Malagò and International Olympic Committee president Kirsty Coventry delivered official remarks, with Coventry declaring the closing of the Games, praising them as "magical games", and inviting the youth of the world and the audience to assemble in the French Alps in 4 years. The flame was extinguished at the arena in Milan, and Cortina d'Ampezzo, while pianist Gloria Campaner performed Experience by Ludovico Einaudi. This was followed by the musical performances of Diplo, Major Lazer, Meduza, MØ, Nyla, DJ Snake, and Alfa. To end the ceremony, Achille Lauro performed his song "Incoscienti giovani" as a light show also took place in its stead, leaving the characters from the opera segment resting under the arena.

=== Victory ceremonies ===
Women's cross-country skier medalists

- Ebba Andersson (SWE)
- Heidi Weng (NOR)
- Nadja Kälin (SUI)

Men's cross-country skier medalists

- Johannes Høsflot Klæbo (NOR)
- Martin Løwstrøm Nyenget (NOR)
- Emil Iversen (NOR)

== Anthems ==
- National Anthem of Italy – Paolo Fresu and the Choir of the Fondazione Arena di Verona
- National Anthem of Greece
- (International Olympic Committee) Olympic Anthem – Choir and Orchestra of the Fondazione Arena di Verona
- (France) French National Anthem – Marine Chagnon

=== Victory ceremonies ===
- National Anthem of Norway
- National Anthem of Sweden

== Music performances ==
- Italian tenor Vincenzo Costanzo and Bolivian-Albanian soprano Carolina Lopez Moreno performed "Libiamo ne' lieti calici" from La Traviata
- Italian singers Margherita Vicario and Davide Shorty sang to the music of Calibro 35
- Gabry Ponte, who was previously a member of the Eurodance group Eiffel 65, performed the group's song "Blue (Da Ba Dee)"
- Italian singer Joan Thiele performed a cover of Jimmy Fontana's "Il mondo"
- Pianist Gloria Campaner performed Experience by Ludovico Einaudi
- Italian singer Achille Lauro performed his song "Incoscienti giovani"
- American electronic music group Major Lazer featuring MØ and Italian rapper Alfa

== Dignitaries in attendance ==
=== International Olympic Committee ===
- International Olympic Committee⁣ – ⁣Kirsty Coventry, President of the International Olympic Committee

Members of the International Olympic Committee and the Olympic movement, not counting foreign representatives

=== Host ===
- Italy –
  - Giorgia Meloni, Prime Minister of Italy
  - Giovanni Malagò, President of the Milano Cortina Organising Committee for the 2026 Olympic and Paralympic Winter Games
  - Giuseppe Sala, Mayor of Milan
  - Gianluca Lorenzi, Mayor of Cortina d'Ampezzo
  - Damiano Tommasi, Mayor of Verona

=== International ===
- France –
  - Renaud Muselier, President of the Provence-Alpes-Côte d'Azur region
  - Fabrice Pannekoucke, President of the Auvergne-Rhone-Alpes region

== Television coverage ==
The closing ceremony was filmed by host broadcaster Olympic Broadcasting Services (OBS), with OBS distributing a "world feed" for rights-holding broadcasters to use.

According to Auditel ratings, the closing ceremony was seen in Italy by an average of 6.2 million viewers.

=== Commentators and hosts ===
- Australia
  - Nine Network: Todd Woodbridge, Leila McKinnon and Lydia Lassila.
- Brazil
  - Grupo Globo (SporTV and Ge TV): Luiz Carlos Júnior, Marcel Stürmmer and Marcelo Apovian.
  - CazéTV: Luís Felipe Freitas.
- Canada
  - CBC Sports: Andi Petrillo, Anastasia Bucsis, and Kurt Browning
- Italy
  - Rai 1: Auro Bulbarelli, Cecilia Gasdia, and Fabio Genovesi
- Netherlands
  - NPO 1 (NOS): Erik van Dijk and Mark Tuitert.
- Sweden
  - TV4: Peter Backe, Peter Reinebo, Olof Lundh
- United Kingdom
  - BBC Two: John Hunt and Hazel Irvine
- United States
  - NBC Sports (NBCUniversal): Terry Gannon, Tara Lipinski, and Johnny Weir.
