= Luna Nera =

2020 Italian television series

- Poster
- Genre: Historical drama
- Created by: Francesca Manieri; Laura Paolucci; Tiziana Triana
- Based on: Le città perdute by Tiziana Triana
- Directed by: Francesca Comencini; Susanna Nicchiarelli; Paola Randi
- Starring: Nina Fotaras; Giorgio Belli; Gloria Carovana; Giandomenico Cupaiuolo
- Country of origin: Italy
- Original language: Italian
- No. of seasons: 1
- No. of episodes: 6

Production
- Producer: Domenico Procacci
- Running time: 40-56 minutes
- Production company: Fandango

Original release
- Network: Netflix
- Release: January 31, 2020

Luna Nera (English: Black Moon) is an Italian historical fantasy television series created by Francesca Manieri, Laura Paolucci and Tiziana Triana, starring Nina Fotaras, Giorgio Belli, Gloria Carovana and Giandomenico Cupaiuolo.

The plot takes place in the 17th-century in Serra, a fictitional village near Rome, and revolves around women who are accused of being witches, who defend themselves and fight back. It is based on the trilogy of novels Le città perdute by Tiziana Triana.

== Cast ==
- Antonia Fotaras as Ade, a young witch with strong sensing abilities.
- Giada Gagliardi as Valente, the sick little brother of Ade who she is left to take care of.
- Barbara Ronchi as Antalia, the mother of Ade and Valente. After birthing Valente, she disguised herself as an older woman and claimed to be their grandmother, Natalia.
- Sonia Gessner as Natalia, the grandmother of Ade and Valente.
- Giorgio Belli as Pietro, a man who returns from college and becomes smitten with Ade. He doesn’t believe in sorcery and is furious about the executions committed by his witch-hunter father.
- Gloria Carovana as Cesaria, Pietro’s little adoptive sister who aides their father in witch-hunting.
- Giandomenico Cupaiuolo as Sante, father of Pietro and Cesaria and leader of a group of witch hunters called the Benandanti, inspired by their historical counterpart.
- Astrid Meloni as Amelia, Pietro and Cesaria’s sick, bed-ridden mother.
- Adalgisa Manfrida as Persepolis, a young witch who, after an initial conflict, becomes close friends with Ade.
- Filippo Scotti as Spirto, an orphan working for Sante's household, who has a secret relationship with Persepolis.
- Federica Fracassi as Janara, a tough-as-nails witch who is comfortable with both magic and weapons, inspired by Witches of Benevento
- Manuela Mandracchia as Tebe, the powerful and strong-willed leader of the witches.
- Lucrezia Guidone as Leptis, a woman with martial training who is a confidante of the witches and Tebe's lover.
- Camille Dugay Comencini as Aquileia, a new witch adept.
- Martina Limonta as Segesta, a new witch adept.
- Giulia Alberoni as Petra, a new witch adept.
- Roberto De Francesco as Marzio Oreggi. a powerful cardinal supporting the witch hunting
- Paolo Bernardini as Marzio Oreggi during his youth.
- Gaetano Aronica: as padre Tosco, the local priest.
- Marilena Anniballi as Agnese, a woman who lost a child during birth and accused Natalia (who acted as midwife) of witchcraft.
- Daniele Amendola as Giambattista, Agnese's husband.
- Nathan Macchioni as Adriano.
- Aliosha Massine as Benedetto.
- Gianmarco Vettori as Nicola.

== Episodes ==
No.	Title	Directed by	Written by	Original release date
1	"Omen" "Omen"	Francesca Comencini	Francesca Manieri	January 31, 2020
Natalia, an old midwife, asks her granddaughter Ade to help her during the difficult birth of a child. While the woman goes into labor, Ade has a sudden and violent premonition, prompting her to desperately warn the woman that "Death is coming" for her infant. The pregnant woman, Agnese, misunderstands and in fear, sends them away, accusing Ade of witchcraft. Returning home, Natalia tells Ade that she may possess some ancient powers; she hides a mysterious book in the house and teaches her a spell to retrieve it. She then tells her that she should seek the Lost Cities in case she will not be back. Natalia flees but she is soon captured by a group of witch-hunters called the Benandanti. A young man called Pietro is studying in Rome with a medicine professor, who explains to his students that witchcraft does not exist and only scientific knowledge can lead to the truth. When he returns home to treat his mother's illness, he discovers that his father Sante, the leader of the Benandanti, believes that the same witch who allegedly killed Agnese's baby is the source of the disease. Pietro's attempts to prove that the baby died of natural causes are dismissed by the local priest, padre Tosco, who insists that it has been the work of a witch. Before Natalia's execution, Pietro meets Ade and saves her from the mob who accuses her of witchcraft as well. When Natalia is put at the stake, she casts a spell to conjure up a storm and extinguish the fire, but Sante kills her with his knife. After watching her grandma die, Ade thanks Pietro for his help and he proposes her to meet him in the next days in the woods by the fountain. Ade and her little brother Valente leave for the woods and manage to find the secret entrance to the Lost Cities.
2	"Liber" "The Book"	Francesca Comencini	Laura Paolucci	January 31, 2020
The women living in the Lost Cities prepare Natalia's body for the funeral and Ade is shocked to see it transforming into the body of her own mother, Antalia, who she believed was already dead. Tebe, the leader of the witches, explains to Ade that she, Antalia and Janara studied together and were taught how to use the powerful Book of the Kingdoms. Another student, Marzio Oreggi, who also wanted to be taught the secret knowledge, was sent away but he returned to read the book and confront their teacher, Diotima, ending up killing her. As a consequence, Antalia was chosen to look after the book, which she hid at her house. Meanwhile, padre Tosco tells Sante that His Eminence is looking for a book owned by Natalia. Cesaria, Pietro's adoptive sister, and Spirto, an orphan working for the household, discover the Book of Kingdoms in Ade's house but they cannot separate it from the roots of the floorboards. When Janara is sent to retrieve the book, she discovers that Sante's men are surrounding the house. At the Lost Cities, Ade meets the young witch Persepolis, with whom she clashes at first, but the two girls bond over their respective love interests: Persepolis has indeed a secret relation with Spirto. Ade decides to meet Pietro at the fountain and with Persepolis' help she leaves the house. When the other witches find out, Janara and Leptis go after Ade and discover that, after meeting Pietro, she is trying to retrieve the book herself. However, after reciting the spell to free it from the roots, Ade is attacked by the Benandanti. Janara and Leptis arrive in time to save her but Cesaria manages to keep the book.
3	"Voces" "Voices"	Susanna Nicchiarelli	Vanessa Picciarelli	January 31, 2020
Ade keeps meeting Pietro by the fountain, until he asks her to marry him, naively believing that it may stop his family from persecuting her. She is shocked by the proposal and asks him for a day to think over, but in the meantime she is constantly haunted by voices of women calling for help, which eventually make her collapse. When Janara and Tebe find out about Ade's gift, they explain her that these are voices of other witches in danger, and the three of them rush out in the night to save the closest one. However, they arrive too late, as she kills herself to escape the Benandanti. Tebe tries in vain to convince Ade to keep listening to the voices in her head and help them to find other witches in danger. Frustrated to be left behind, Leptis bonds with Valente over their lack of magical abilities, and teaches him how to use a bow. In the meantime, after having received the Book of Kingdoms from Cesaria, Sante brings it to a church where a cardinal manages to magically open it. Tebe and Janara perceive that the book has been opened and deduce that it is in the hand of Marzio Oreggi. Ade tells Persepolis that she decided to marry Pietro and leaves in the middle of the night after saying goodbye to Valente. When they meet again at the fountain, however, she has a vision of Pietro's mother dead, so she compels him to go back home to see Amelia one more time.
4	"Fatum" "Fate"	Susanna Nicchiarelli	Tiziana Triana	January 31, 2020
During the funeral of Amelia, padre Tosco denounces those who chose science over religion, angering Pietro, who was curing his mother with his medicines. Ade visits him, but he is confused about what happened and he tells her that his place is with his father right now. Sante continues his crusades against witchcraft by taking many innocent women prisoners and having his men interrogate them to discover where the witches live. Pietro complains at first that these actions will not bring back his wife, but ends up drowning his sorrow in a bar in the evening. After being saved from a fight by Cesaria, he kisses her but she quickly stops him for now. In the dwelling, the witches manage to convince Ade to use again her powers and this time they rescue several women that Ade has been hearing. After a ritual to rebirth the Lost Cities, the new women are initiated as witches for the upcoming battle. Leptis complains to Tebe that she wants to save also the other non-magical women which have been arrested, but Tebe insists that they have to concentrate first on the witches or they will not stand a chance. Marzio promises Sante great power and the possibility to see his wife again if he will bring Ade to him. Pietro gets initiated into the Benandanti, but has later a change of heart and throws the medallion on the floor.
5	"Arma" "Weapons"	Paola Randi	Francesca Manieri & Tiziana Triana	January 31, 2020
While Sante announces death punishments for anyone helping the witches, Cesaria confronts a confused Pietro about their kiss the night before. Spirto tells Pietro that he is going to become a Benandante but he is not sure if he really wants it, and that he has not seen Persepolis in a while. Similarly, Pietro confides him that he is not sure who Ade really is. After Pietro leaves, Persepolis, who has been listening the whole time, appears to Spirto: he suggests her to marry him but she refuses and leaves. Persepolis tells the other witches what she heard in Serra: cardinal Oreggi is the one who has the book and he will bless the weapons of the Benandanti in the inn later this evening. This causes disagreements between Tebe and Leptis on the next course of action, but Tebe insists that getting the book back should be their priority. After realising that her brother is missing, Ade worries that he has gone after Sante, so she leaves to find him; Janara, Tebe and Leptis rush after them. In the inn, after Marzio imbues the weapons with his magical power, Valente shoots an arrow, but Marzio manages to grab it before it reaches Sante's head. Ade arrives and takes her brother away just as the Benandanti chase after them. Tebe, Janara and Leptis come to their help, but during their escape Leptis and Valente end up being captured. In order to find out where Ade is, Marzio tries to tempt Valente with the promise of new powers, while Sante has Leptis tortured. After these methods prove to be ineffective, Marzio publicly announces that they will both be killed tomorrow, hoping that their execution will attract Ade.
6	"Lux" "Light"	Paola Randi	Laura Paolucci & Vanessa Picciarelli	January 31, 2020
Persepolis visits Serra again, finding out about the execution. Ade and Tebe meet Pietro at the fountain and agree on plan to free Valente and Leptis: Pietro would ask Spirto to provide a key of the cell, while they would exploit a local festival to head to the dungeons. However, the witches are ambushed by the Benandanti, who learnt about their plan after having tortured Spirto. They are captured and forced to wear some clothes Marzio has previously cursed to block their powers. The prisoners are brought to the stakes but Ade is separated and taken to Marzio. As Sante is about to give the execution order, an eclipse appears and Valente is shown to possess magical powers, levitating in the crowd and freeing the witches. After Sante manages to grab the boy, he is soon stopped by Ade, who stabs him in the heart in front of a shocked Pietro before running away with the witches. Marzio leaves the town with the Book of the Kingdoms, while Pietro decides to avenge his father by taking the lead of the Benandanti. He names Spirto as his second-in-command, much to the disagreement and the protests of Cesaria. The witches perform a baptism for Valente, now renamed Luxor. In a vision, Antalia explains to Ade that she gave up her youth to protect her second daughter by turning her into a boy. The spell would only last until the first black moon, which will reveal who Valente really is: the chosen one and a girl. Ade angrily banishes her mother away and run in the snow, screaming in frustration; while she casts a spell, her eyes turn black.

== Production and release ==
Filming for the series lasted 16 weeks and mostly took place in Cinecittà studios. In the episodes you can also see: the Parco degli Acquedotti of Rome, Sorano, the ghost town of Celleno, Sutri, the Selva del Lamone, the castle of Montecalvello and the ghost town of Monterano.

Netflix distributed the trailer of Luna Nera on 15 January 2020 and released the series on 31 January 2020.
