= Parthenope (film) =

2024 film by Paolo Sorrentino

- Release poster
- Directed by: Paolo Sorrentino
- Written by: Paolo Sorrentino
- Produced by: Lorenzo Mieli; Ardavan Safaee; Paolo Sorrentino; Anthony Vaccarello
- Starring: Celeste Dalla Porta; Stefania Sandrelli; Gary Oldman; Silvio Orlando; Luisa Ranieri; Peppe Lanzetta; Isabella Ferrari
- Cinematography: Daria D'Antonio
- Edited by: Cristiano Travaglioli
- Music by: Lele Marchitelli
- Production companies: The Apartment Pictures; Pathé
- Distributed by: PiperFilm (Italy, through Warner Bros. Entertainment Italia); Pathé Distribution (France)
- Release dates: 21 May 2024 (Cannes); 24 October 2024 (Italy); 12 March 2025 (France)
- Running time: 136 minutes
- Countries: Italy; France
- Languages: Italian; Neapolitan; English
- Budget: €32.6 million
- Box office: $11.7 million

Parthenope is a 2024 coming-of-age drama film written, produced, and directed by Paolo Sorrentino. An international co-production between Italy and France, the film stars Celeste Dalla Porta, Stefania Sandrelli, Gary Oldman, Silvio Orlando, Luisa Ranieri, Peppe Lanzetta, and Isabella Ferrari. It tells the story of a woman looking for love in Naples, Italy, and falling for various characters she meets along the way.

Parthenope was selected to compete for the Palme d'Or at the 77th Cannes Film Festival, where it premiered on 21 May 2024. It was theatrically released in Italy by PiperFilm on 24 October 2024. The film received mixed reviews.

== Plot ==
In 1950, the affluent Di Sangro family awaits the birth of their daughter in the waters of Posillipo. The birth is attended by her wealthy godfather Achille Lauro, her older brother Raimondo, and Sandrino, the son of the family's housekeeper. Achille gives her the name Parthenope in honour of the city of Naples.

In 1968, Sandrino is obsessed with Parthenope, and Raimondo is incestuously attached to her. Parthenope attends an anthropology course taught by Professor Devoto Marotta, known for his severity. She challenges Marotta during an evaluation of her knowledge and they develop mutual respect.

In 1973, Raimondo suggests to Parthenope and Sandrino that they go to Capri. Parthenope’s carefree behaviour attracts the attention of many people, including the writer John Cheever whose work she has read. Raimondo ingratiates himself with an heiress, but cannot kiss her and realises he loves only Parthenope. After seeing Sandrino seduce Parthenope, Raimondo throws himself from the cliffs of Capri.

In 1974, Parthenope's mother blames her for Raimondo's death and her father becomes completely detached. She asks Marotta to advise her on an anthropology dissertation about suicide. He instead suggests researching the cultural impact of miracles. Parthenope briefly interrupts her studies and tries to become an actress. First, she sees the acting teacher Flora Malva, an elderly diva who directs her to Greta Cool, an actress who shares Parthenope's Neapolitan origins. At a party in Greta's honour, Parthenope meets Roberto Criscuolo, a mafioso who takes her to a family ritual, in which the heirs of two Camorra families conceive a child to mark unity. Parthenope then becomes pregnant by Criscuolo, but privately procures an illegal abortion. Sandrino later arrives to bid her farewell before moving to Milan, and she lashes out, blaming him for Raimondo's death.

In 1982, Parthenope is a university scholar. She receives an invitation from an anthropology journal to write an article on the liquefaction of the blood of San Gennaro. Marotta warns her about Cardinal Tesorone, who oversees the miracle, calling him a "scoundrel". Tesorone asks her to have sex with him and Parthenope agrees. Marotta tells Parthenope that he aims to retire, and suggests that she apply for a teaching position at the University of Trento. At first Parthenope refuses, because of her love for Naples. Marotta introduces her to his severely disabled son. Parthenope seems compelled by his son, but remains in Trento.

In 2023 as she is retiring from academia, Parthenope discusses with two students the profound impact she had on their lives and briefly answers some of their questions about her personal life. She visits Capri, remembering her youth, then returns to Naples. Parthenope smiles as a passing group of fans celebrate SSC Napoli’s third Serie A championship.

== Cast ==
- Celeste Dalla Porta as Parthenope Di Sangro
  - Stefania Sandrelli as older Parthenope
- Gary Oldman as John Cheever
- Silvio Orlando as Devoto Marotta
- Luisa Ranieri as Greta Cool
- Peppe Lanzetta as Cardinal Tesorone
- Isabella Ferrari as Flora Malva
- Lorenzo Gleijeses as Sasa Di Sangro
- Daniele Rienzo as Raimondo Di Sangro
- Dario Aita as Sandrino
- Marlon Joubert as Roberto Criscuolo
- Alfonso Santagata as Comandante
- Biagio Izzo
- Paola Calliari
- Nello Mascia as Riccardo Macchia
- Silvia Degrandi as Maggie Di Sangro
- Cristiano Scotto di Galletta as gardener

== Production ==
Sorrentino has said the film is about a woman named Parthenope "who bears the name of her city but is neither siren", like the mythical figure of the same name (who gave her name to the city Parthenope, the antique predecessor of modern-day Naples), "nor myth".

Parthenope was co-produced by Lorenzo Mieli for Fremantle's The Apartment Pictures and Ardavan Safaee for Pathé, in association with Sorrentino's Numero 10, PiperFilm, Anthony Vaccarello's Saint Laurent Productions, and Logical Content Ventures. In August 2023, Gary Oldman was announced as part of the cast.

Principal photography took place in Naples and Capri. Sorrentino worked with cinematographer Daria D'Antonio, who also shot The Hand of God.

== Release ==
Parthenope was selected to compete for the Palme d'Or at the 2024 Cannes Film Festival, where it had its world premiere on 21 May 2024 and earned a nine-and-a-half minute standing ovation at the end of its screening.

Before the film’s Cannes premiere, A24 acquired its North American distribution rights. In May 2024, the formation of a new Italian distribution and international sales company named PiperFilm was announced, with Netflix as its partner for the post-theatrical window and with agreement reached with Warner Bros. Entertainment Italia for operational theatrical distribution of its films. Parthenope was PiperFilm's first acquisition, and was released on 24 October 2024. The film was theatrically released on 12 March 2025 in France by Pathé, which also handled international sales. A24 gave the film a limited theatrical release beginning on 7 February 2025 in New York City and Los Angeles. Picturehouse Entertainment theatrically released the film in the UK and Ireland on 2 May 2025.

== Reception ==
=== Critical response ===
On the review aggregator website Rotten Tomatoes, 46% of 100 critics' reviews are positive. The website's consensus reads: "Equal parts sumptuous and vapid, Parthenope gains some radiance thanks to Celeste Dalla Porta's arresting performance but frustratingly finds writer-director Paolo Sorrentino out of his depth." Metacritic, which uses a weighted average, assigned the film a score of 52 out of 100, based on 26 critics, indicating "mixed or average" reviews.

The Guardian's Peter Bradshaw called the film "facile" and "conceited", accusing Sorrentino of "pure self-parody" and likening the film to a long-form advertisement for expensive cologne. Cineuropa's Davide Abbatescianni called it Sorrentino's "less accomplished feature film, technically impeccable but narratively weak”, adding that Dalla Porta's character "is too cryptic", making the audience "struggle to understand her behaviour, her arrogance and audacity, and the many bombastic and didactic conversations she's part of."

The New York Times's Beatrice Loayza called the film a "one-sided meditation on art, desire and spirituality" and noted Sorrentino's "lack of interest in realism—or political correctness for that matter". Loayza praised Sorrentino’s opulent style and "big ideas" but criticized him for being "more interested in deifying Parthenope than he is in humanizing her […] the portrait is inherently limited."

=== Accolades ===
List of awards and nominations for Parthenope
| Award or film festival | Date of ceremony | Category | Recipient(s) | Result | Ref. |
|---|---|---|---|---|---|
| Cannes Film Festival | 25 May 2024 | Palme d'Or | Paolo Sorrentino | Nominated | |
| Cannes Film Festival | 25 May 2024 | CST Award for Best Artist-Technician | Daria D'Antonio | Won | |
| Manaki Brothers Film Festival | 27 September 2024 | Golden Camera 300 | Daria D'Antonio | Nominated | |
| Capri Hollywood International Film Festival | 2 January 2025 | Capri Breakout Actor Award | Peppe Lanzetta | Won | |
| Polish Film Awards | 9 March 2026 | Best European Film | Paolo Sorrentino | Pending | |
