= The Meter Reader =

1995 drama film

- Directed by: Stefano Incerti
- Screenplay by: Stefano Incerti; Giovanni Molino
- Starring: Antonino Iuorio; Roberto De Francesco
- Cinematography: Pasquale Mari
- Edited by: Jacopo Quadri
- Music by: Peter Gordon; John Martyn
- Release date: 1995
- Language: Italian

The Meter Reader (Italian: Il verificatore), also known as The Man Who Checks the Meter, is a 1995 Italian drama film co-written and directed by Stefano Incerti, at his feature film debut. It premiered at the 52nd Venice International Film Festival.

== Cast ==
- Antonino Iuorio as Crescenzio
- Roberto De Francesco as Beniamino
- Elodie Treccani as Giuliana
- Renato Carpentieri as the Boss
- Carmen Scivittaro as the Mother
- Teresa Saponangelo as Valeria
- Enzo Moscato as the Psychopath
- Antonio Pennarella as Renato
- Carlo Cerciello as the Doorman

== Production ==
Incerti worked on the project for four years. Principal photography started in December 1994.

== Release ==
The film premiered at the 52nd edition of the Venice Film Festival, in the Overtaking Lane sidebar.

== Reception ==
For this film Incerti won the David di Donatello for Best New Director and the Grolla d'oro for Best Director.

Variety's critic David Rooney described the film as a "melancholy drama" that "overcomes a fragile script with astute assembly of its fragmentary narrative", and wrote: "Familiar themes of loneliness and alienation are explored with originality, economy and firm control".
