= Senza una stupida storia =

Single by Achille Lauro

from the album Comuni mortali
- Released: 12 September 2025
- Genre: Pop; power ballad
- Length: 2:59
- Label: Warner Music Italy
- Songwriters: Lauro De Marinis; Daniele Nelli; Federica Abbate; Matteo Ciceroni
- Composers: Daniele Nelli; Fabrizio Pagni; Gregorio Calculli; Matteo Ciceroni
- Producers: Danien; Gow Tribe

Achille Lauro singles chronology
"Amor" (2025)	"Senza una stupida storia" (2025)	"Perdutamente" (2026)

Music video
- "Senza una stupida storia" on YouTube

"Senza una stupida storia" (transl. Without a stupid story) is a song by Italian singer-songwriter Achille Lauro. It was released on 12 September 2025 by Warner Music Italy as the first single from the digital reissue of the seventh studio album, Comuni mortali.

== Description ==
The song, a thoughtful and intimate power ballad written by the singer-songwriter himself in Milan and completed in Los Angeles, also features collaborations with Daniele Nelli, aka Danien, Federica Abbate, and Matteo Ciceroni, aka Gow Tribe, and was produced by the latter with Danien. Regarding the song, the artist said:

I particularly love the verses of this song because they express my personal vision of love. I've also suffered from love in the past, like everyone else. Sometimes love creates such a dependence that it makes you feel like nothing, almost self-annihilating, the idea of feeling "complete" only through the other, obliterating your own self in the name of something we've only idealized. For me, love isn't this.

== Promotion ==
The release of the song was revealed by the singer-songwriter himself on 8 September 2025 through his social media profiles.

== Music video ==
The music video, directed by Gabriele Savino (xPuro), was released on 15 September 2025 via Achille Lauro's YouTube channel.

== Charts ==
Weekly chart performance for "Senza una stupida storia"
Chart (2025)	Peak position
Italy (FIMI)	24
Italy Airplay (EarOne)	1

== Certifications ==
Certifications for "Senza una stupida storia"
Region	Certification	Certified units/sales
Italy (FIMI)	Gold	100,000^{‡}
^{‡} Sales+streaming figures based on certification alone.
