= Amore disperato (Achille Lauro song) =

Single by Achille Lauro

from the album Comuni mortali
- Released: 20 September 2024
- Genre: Pop rock; power ballad
- Length: 2:33
- Label: Warner Music Italy
- Songwriters: Lauro De Marinis; Federica Abbate; Federico Olivieri
- Composers: Daniele Nelli; Eugenio Maimone; Federico Mercuri; Giordano Cremona; Gregorio Calculli; Leonardo Grillotti; Matteo Ciceroni
- Producers: Danien; Gow Tribe; ITACA; Wolvs

Achille Lauro singles chronology
"Banda Kawasaki" (2024)	"Amore disperato" (2024)	"Incoscienti giovani" (2025)

Music video
- "Amore disperato" on YouTube

"Amore disperato" (transl. Desperate love) is a song by Italian singer-songwriter Achille Lauro. It was released on 20 September 2024 by Warner Music Italy as the first single from the seventh studio album, Comuni mortali.

== Description ==
The song, written by the artist himself with Federica Abbate and Federico Olivieri, aka Olly, is produced by Daniele Nelli, aka Danien, Matteo Ciceroni, aka Gow Tribe, ITACA, a team founded by the musical duo Merk & Kremont, and Leonardo Grillotti, aka Wolvs.

== Music video ==
The music video, directed by Davide De Meo, was released on the Achille Lauro's YouTube channel to coincide with the song's release.

== Charts ==
=== Weekly charts ===
Weekly chart performance for "Amore disperato"
Chart (2024)	Peak position
Italy (FIMI)	4
Italy Airplay (EarOne)	1

=== Year-end charts ===
Year-end chart performance for "Amore disperato"
Chart	Year	Position
Italy (FIMI)	2024	81
Italy (FIMI)	2025	30

== Certifications ==
Certifications for "Amore disperato"
Region	Certification	Certified units/sales
Italy (FIMI)	2× Platinum	400,000^{‡}
^{‡} Sales+streaming figures based on certification alone.
