= Roberto De Francesco =

Italian actor (born 1964)

- Born: 2 March 1964 (age 62); Caserta, Italy
- Occupation: Actor

Roberto De Francesco (born 2 March 1964) is an Italian film, television, and stage actor.

== Life and career ==
Born in Caserta, in 1987 De Francesco graduated from the Centro Sperimentale di Cinematografia in Rome. He started his career on stage with Mario Martone's company Compagnia dei Teatri Uniti, and often collaborated with Toni Servillo.

De Francesco made his film debut in 1987, in Giuseppe Piccioni's Il grande Blek. In 1992, he was awarded a Grolla d'oro for his performance in Francesco Calogero's Nessuno. In 2017, he received a David di Donatello nomination for best supporting actor thanks to his performance in Irene Dionisio's Le ultime cose.

== Selected filmography ==
- Bankomatt (1989)
- Traces of an Amorous Life (1990)
- The Yes Man (1991)
- Death of a Neapolitan Mathematician (1992)
- The Meter Reader (1995)
- The Second Time (1995)
- Bits and Pieces (1996)
- Five Stormy Days (1997)
- Notes of Love (1998)
- Rehearsals for War (1998)
- Appassionate (1999)
- The Son's Room (2001)
- One Man Up (2001)
- Don't Waste Your Time, Johnny! (2007)
- Piano, solo (2007)
- We Believed (2010)
- We Have a Pope (2011)
- Miele (2013)
- Mom or Dad? (2017)
- Il colore nascosto delle cose (2017)
- Loro (2018)
- The Mayor of Rione Sanità (2019)
- Hammamet (2020)
- The King of Laughter (2021)
- Three Floors (2021)
- The Inner Cage (2021)
- The Hand of God (2021)
- Sicilian Letters (2024)
- The American Backyard (2024)
- Mussolini: Son of the Century (2025)
