= Amor (Achille Lauro song) =

Single by Achille Lauro

from the album Comuni mortali
- Released: 18 April 2025
- Genre: Pop; power ballad
- Length: 2:57
- Label: Warner Music Italy
- Songwriters: Lauro De Marinis; Daniele Nelli; Jhoanna Bellina; Matteo Ciceroni
- Composers: Daniele Nelli; Matteo Ciceroni
- Producers: Danien; Gow Tribe

Achille Lauro singles chronology
"Incoscienti giovani" (2025)	"Amor" (2025)	"Senza una stupida storia" (2025)

Music video
- "Amor" on YouTube

"Amor" is a song by Italian singer-songwriter Achille Lauro. It was released on 18 April 2025 by Warner Music Italy as the third single from the seventh studio album, Comuni mortali.

== Description ==
The song, written by the singer-songwriter himself with Daniele Nelli, aka Danien, Jhoanna Bellina, and Matteo Ciceroni, aka Gow Tribe, was produced by the latter with Danien and is dedicated to the city of Rome, the place where the artist grew up.

== Promotion ==
The song was previewed by the singer-songwriter himself on 15 April 2025 during a secret live show in Piazza di Spagna in Rome.

"Amor" was used in the McDonald's commercial, which will air from April 2025.

== Music video ==
The music video, directed by Gabriele Savino (xPuro) and filmed at the Foro Italico in Rome, was released on the same day via Achille Lauro's YouTube channel and saw the participation of several fans of the artist.

== Charts ==
=== Weekly charts ===
Weekly chart performance for "Amor"
Chart (2025)	Peak position
Italy (FIMI)	5
Italy Airplay (EarOne)	1

=== Year-end charts ===
Year-end chart performance for "Amor"
Chart (2025)	Position
Italy (FIMI)	18

== Certifications ==
Certifications for "Amor"
Region	Certification	Certified units/sales
Italy (FIMI)	2× Platinum	400,000^{‡}
^{‡} Sales+streaming figures based on certification alone.
