= Daria D'Antonio =

Italian cinematographer

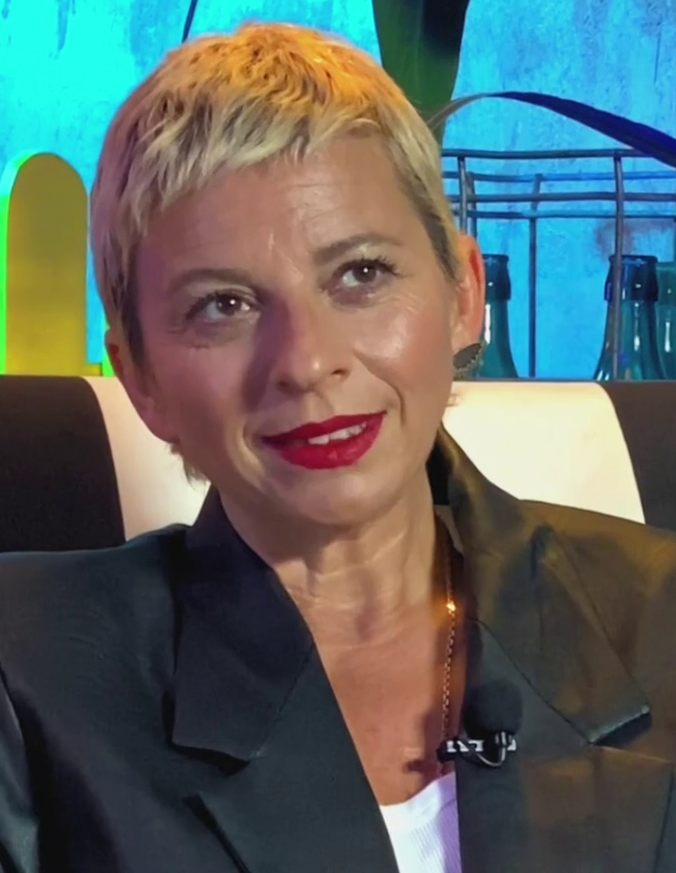
D'Antonio in 2024

Daria D'Antonio is an Italian cinematographer.

== Life and career ==
Born in Naples, D'Antonio studied at the Accademia di Belle Arti di Napoli, and started her career in the film industry as a camera operator under Luca Bigazzi. She made her debut as cinematographer in 2007, in Pietro Marcello's Passing the Line.

In 2020, D'Antonio was the first Italian female cinematographer to be nominated for a David di Donatello for best cinematography thanks to her work in Valerio Mieli's Remember?, and in 2022 she was the first woman to win the award for the cinematography of Paolo Sorrentino's The Hand of God. For the same film she was also awarded the Nastro d'Argento for best cinematography. During her career she also won two Globi d'oro, for Marco Segato's On the Trail of My Father and Mieli's Remember?. In 2024, D'Antonio received the CST Award for Best Artist-Technician at the 77th Cannes Film Festival for Sorrentino's Parthenope.

== Selected filmography ==
- Italo (2007)
- The Landlords (2012)
- Slam (2016)
- There Is a Light (2017)
- Remember? (2018)
- Tornare (2019)
- The Hand of God (2021)
- Marcel! (2022)
- Supersex (2024)
- Parthenope (2024)
- An Urban Allegory (2024)
- La grazia (2025)
- Primavera (2025)
