= Stefano Incerti =

Italian film director (born 1965)

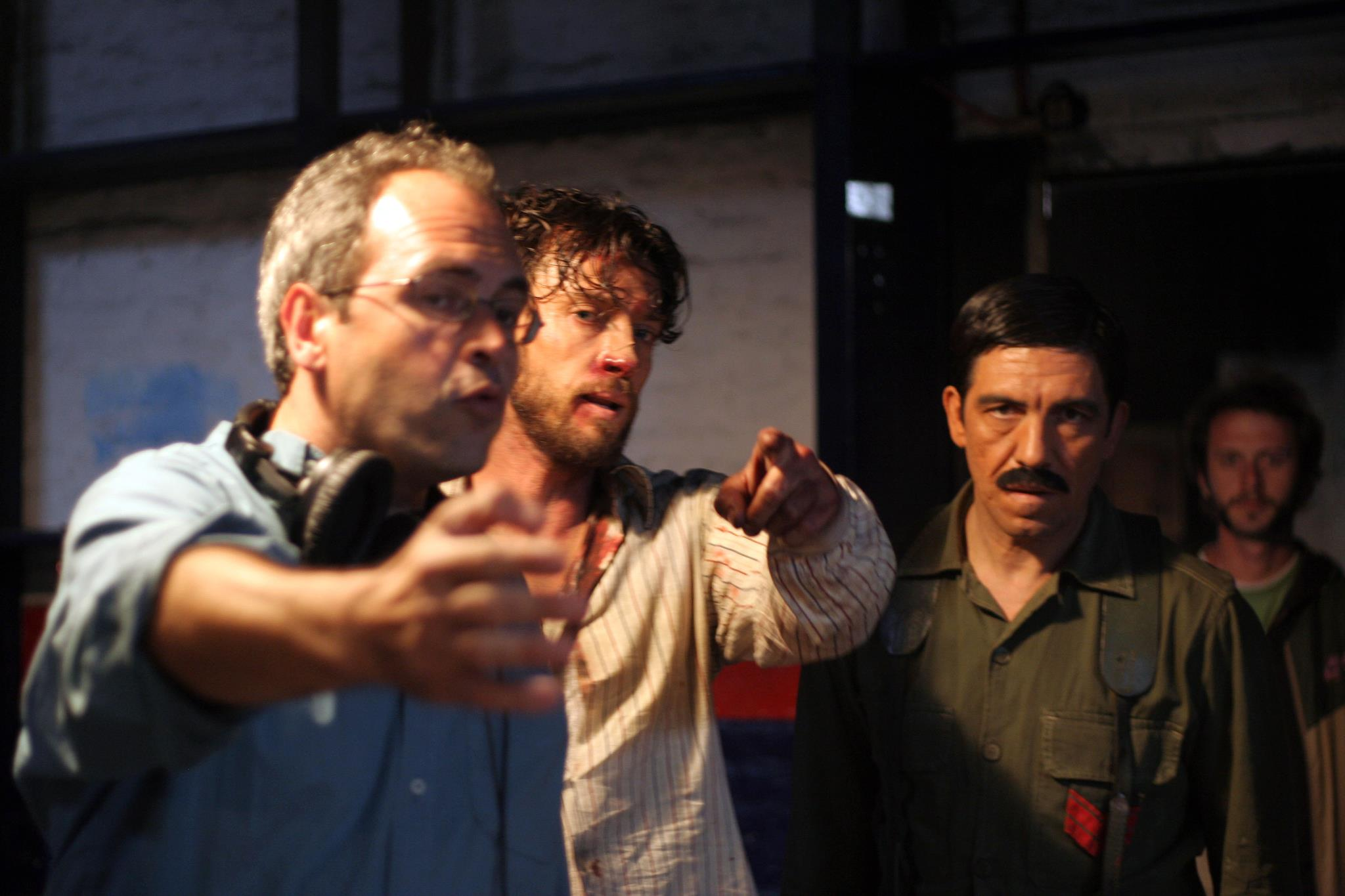
- Born: 25 July 1965 (age 60); Naples, Italy
- Occupation: Director
- Years active: 1995-present

Stefano Incerti (born 25 July 1965) is an Italian film director. He has directed more than ten films since 1995.

In 2014, Stefano directed the drama Snowscape, about Donato (Roberto De Francesco), a man looking for something that would secure his future, and Norah (Esther Elisha), a woman who abandoned and chased by a small-time gangster, from whom she may have stolen something big.

== Selected filmography ==
Year	Title
1995	The Meter Reader
1997	The Vesuvians
2003	Life as It Comes
2007	The Man of Glass
2009	The Hush
2010	Gorbaciof
2014	Snowscape
