= Filippo Scotti =

Italian actor (born 1999)

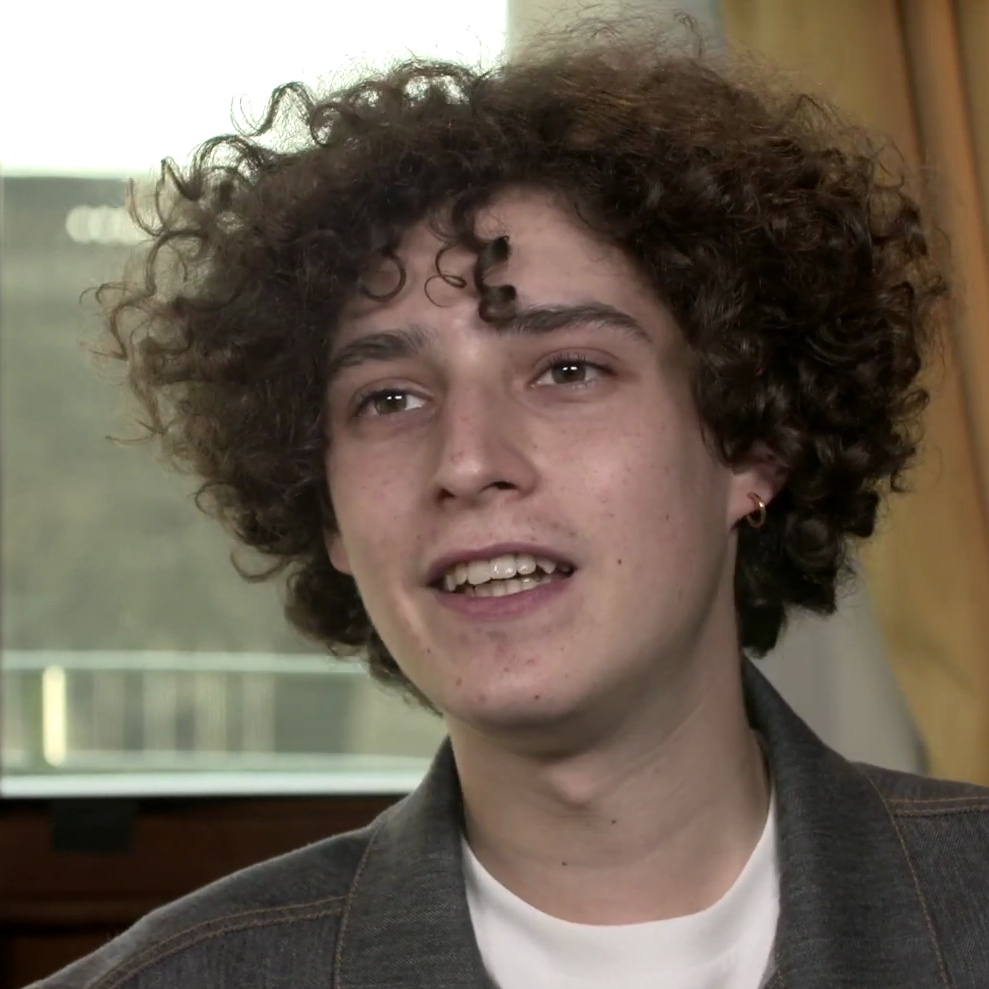
- Scotti in 2021
- Born: 22 December 1999 (age 26); Gravedona, Italy
- Occupation: Actor
- Years active: 2016–present

Filippo Scotti (born 22 December 1999) is an Italian actor. He is known for his role as Fabietto Schisa in the 2021 film The Hand of God, for which he won the Marcello Mastroianni Award at the 78th Venice International Film Festival.

He began his career as a stage actor with Il marchese di Collino, a Patrizia Di Martino play, before working on the 2020 Netflix series Luna nera.

== Early life and career ==
Filippo Scotti was born on 22 December 1999 in Gravedona. Both his parents are teachers. He moved to Naples when he was a child. In 2010 he enrolled in various theatrical courses and workshops, working from 2015 to 2017 with the Murìcena company. In 2017 he made his debut in the show Il marchese di Collini directed by Patrizia Di Martino at the Teatro Bellini. Then he acted in several short films. In 2021 he starred as Fabietto Schisa in the film The Hand of God.

== Filmography ==
=== Film ===
Year	Title	Role	Notes
2016	In calce	Bambino	Short film
2016	MusicaMia		Short film
2018	La gita	Marco	Short film
2020	Il re muore	Henry	
2021	The Hand of God	Fabietto Schisa	Main role
2022	Io e Spotty	Matteo	Main role
2022	Vuja de	Lui	Short film
2024	The American Backyard		
2025	The Last One for the Road	Giulio	

=== Television ===
Year	Title	Role
2019	1994	
2020	Luna nera	Spirto

=== Theatre ===
Year	Title	Role	Venue
2017	Il marchese di Collino		Teatro Bellini
