= Antonia Fotaras =

Italian actress (born 1999)

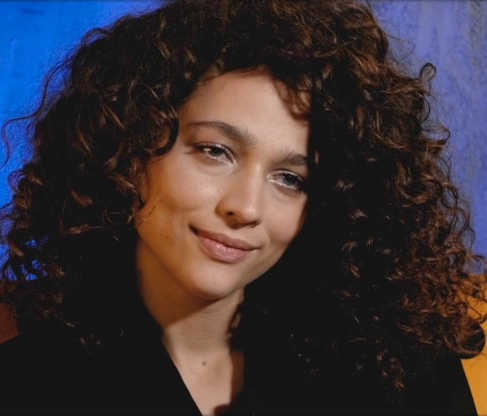
- Fotaras in 2022
- Born: 10 September 1999 (age 26); Rome, Italy
- Occupation: Actress
- Years active: 2018–present

Antonia "Nina" Fotaras (born 10 September 1999) is an Italian actress.

== Biography ==
Fotaras was born in Rome to a Greek father, originally from Symi, and an Italian mother. Her father is an engineer and her mother worked for Telecom Italia Mobile. She has an older brother.

She attended a liceo linguistico. In addition to Italian, she speaks Greek, English, Occitan, French, and German.

== Filmography ==
=== Film ===
Year	Title	Role	Ref.
2019	The First King: Birth of an Empire	Ramtha	
2021	Addio al nubilato	Chiara	
2021	Il silenzio grande	Adele Primic	
2022	La prima regola	Arianna	
2024	Una Fottuta Bugia	Claudia	
TBA	The Way of the Wind	Miriam	
TBA	Death Do Us Part		

=== Television ===
Year	Title	Role	Notes	Ref.
2018–2020	Skam Italia	Laura	15 episodes	
2018	Don Matteo	Cristina	1 episode	
2019	The Name of the Rose	La Ragazza	8 episodes	
2019	Mentre ero via	Sara Grossi	6 episodes	
2020	Luna Nera	Ade Bruno	6 episodes	
2023	Un'estate fa	Arianna	8 episodes	
