= The American Backyard =

2024 Italian film by Pupi Avati

- Italian festival poster
- Italian: L'orto americano
- Directed by: Pupi Avati
- Screenplay by: Pupi Avati
- Based on: The American Backyard by Pupi Avati
- Produced by: Antonio Avati; Gianluca Curti; Santo Versace
- Starring: Filippo Scotti; Rita Tushingham; Armando De Ceccon; Roberto De Francesco; Chiara Caselli; Romano Reggiani; Morena Gentile
- Cinematography: Cesare Bastelli
- Edited by: Ivan Zuccon
- Production companies: DueA Film; Minerva Pictures; Rai Cinema
- Distributed by: 01 Distribution
- Release date: 7 September 2024 (Venice)
- Running time: 107 minutes
- Country: Italy
- Language: Italian

The American Backyard (Italian: L'orto americano) is a 2024 Italian gothic horror film written and directed by Pupi Avati, based on his 2023 novel of the same name. It premiered at the 81st Venice International Film Festival on 7 September 2024 as the festival's closing film.

== Premise ==
In 1940s Bologna, a troubled young man falls in love with an American nurse, Barbara. The following year, he travels to the American Midwest and settles next door to Barbara's mother, who hasn't heard from her daughter since the end of the war, leading the man to embark on a tense search for her.

== Cast ==
- Filippo Scotti as the young writer
- Rita Tushingham as Flora, Barbara's mother
- Armando De Ceccon as Glauco Zagotto
- Roberto De Francesco as Emilio Zagotto
- Chiara Caselli as Doris
- Romano Reggiani as the public prosecutor
- Morena Gentile as Arianna
- Massimo Bonetti as the presiding judge
- Mildred Gustafsson as Barbara
- Robert Madison as Major Capland
- Nicola Nocella as a nurse
- Patrizio Pelizzi as the assizes court judge
- Cesare Cremonini as Ugo Oste
- Andrea Roncato as the marshal
- Claudio Botosso as the legal expert
- Alessia Fabiani as the innkeeper

== Production ==
Regarding the macabre crimes in his film, Avati stated, "I didn't invent anything. These are stories that happened from the Monster of Florence to now. It's the least inventive and most realistic part. I'm more interested in the psychological and psychiatric part. Mine is a story of enormous and extreme loneliness. The protagonist is the loneliest man there is." Principal photography took place in Rome, Ferrara, Ravenna, and Forlì, as well as Davenport, Iowa, in the United States. Filming began in December 2023 and continued into 2024.

== Release ==
A teaser trailer was released on 26 August 2024. The film closed the 81st Venice International Film Festival on 7 September 2024.

== Reception ==
Davide Abbatescianni of Cineuropa called the film "a truly over-the-top noir gothic thriller, unsettling and ridiculous". Emanuele Di Nicola of Cinematografo gave the film three-and-a-half out of five stars, calling it "an arcane and mysterious story, a tale of fear that is also a declaration of being". Alessia Pelonzi of Badtaste called the film "fascinating but unresolved". Paola Casella of Mymovies.it gave the film two-and-a-half out of five stars and wrote, "Avati is, as always, very skilled at creating suspended atmospheres, even if here he risks disorientation." On the other hand, A.S. Chianese of Nocturno gave the film four-and-a-half out of five stars and wrote, "The American Backyard testifies to Avati's firm will to handle at all costs that refined film material that went to compose the American horror classics."

== Awards and nominations ==
Award	Year	Category	Recipient(s)	Result	Ref.
Nastri d'Argento	2025	Best Director	Pupi Avati	Nominated	
Nastri d'Argento	2025	Best Actor	Filippo Scotti	Nominated	
Nastri d'Argento	2025	Best Supporting Actor	Roberto De Francesco	Nominated	
Nastri d'Argento	2025	Best Cinematography	Cesare Bastelli	Nominated	
