= Life as It Comes =

- Directed by: Stefano Incerti
- Starring: Valeria Bruni Tedeschi; Alessandro Haber; Lorenza Indovina; Daniele Liotti; Tony Musante; Stefania Rocca; Stefania Sandrelli; Claudio Santamaria
- Cinematography: Pasquale Mari
- Music by: Paolo Buonvino
- Release date: 9 May 2003
- Language: Italian

Life as It Comes (Italian: La vita come viene) is a 2003 Italian drama film directed by Stefano Incerti.

== Cast ==
- Claudio Santamaria: Marco
- Valeria Bruni Tedeschi: Paola
- Stefania Sandrelli: Meri
- Daniele Liotti: Max
- Alessandro Haber: Beppe
- Stefania Rocca: Giorgia
- Tony Musante: The Professor
- Lorenza Indovina: Laura
