= Incoscienti giovani =

2025 song by Achille Lauro

Single by Achille Lauro

from the album Comuni mortali
- Language: Italian
- Released: 12 February 2025
- Genre: Pop
- Length: 3:24
- Label: Warner Music Italy
- Composers: Daniele Nelli; Davide Simonetta; Gregorio Calculli; Matteo Ciceroni; Paolo Antonacci
- Lyricists: Lauro De Marinis; Davide Simonetta; Paolo Antonacci; Simonpietro Manzari
- Producers: Davide Simonetta; Daniele Nelli; Matteo Ciceroni

Achille Lauro singles chronology
"Amore disperato" (2024)	"Incoscienti giovani" (2025)	"Amor" (2025)

Music video
- "Incoscienti giovani" on YouTube

"Incoscienti giovani" (Italian pronunciation: [iŋkoʃˈʃɛnti ˈdʒoːvani]; "Young, Reckless People") is a 2025 song by Italian singer Achille Lauro, released by Warner Music Italy on 12 February 2025. It competed in the Sanremo Music Festival 2025, where it finished seventh. The song is the second single released from his seventh studio album Comuni mortali, released on 18 April 2025.

== Composition ==
The song, written by the singer himself with Davide "d.whale" Simonetta, Paolo Antonacci and Simonpietro Manzari, and produced by d.whale, Daniele Nelli, and Matteo Ciceroni (known professionally as Gow Tribe). The song marked the artist's fourth participation in the Sanremo Festival. During the announcement of the results on the final night of Sanremo, the crowd in the theatre were upset at Lauro's exclusion from the top 5, with a standing ovation, and people heard shouting his name. In an interview with Rolling Stone Italia, Lauro explained the meaning of the song:

"Sviluppo la storia di una ragazza che potrebbe essere mia figlia, il mio amore, mia madre. La cosa più da incosciente che uno potrebbe fare? Amare, ovvero dare l’opportunità a qualcuno di ucciderti e sperare che non lo faccia. È un brano che si rifà alle grandi canzoni con cui siamo cresciuti. Sembra un classico italiano uscito dagli anni '60"

English: ("I develop the story of a young girl who could be my daughter, my love, my mother. The most reckless thing that one could do? To love, that is to really give someone the opportunity to kill you, and to hope that they won't do it. It is a song that really takes you back to the great songs that we grew up with. It seems like an Italian classic from the 1960s")

== Music video ==
A music video of "Incoscienti giovani", directed by Gabriele Savino, was released on 12 February 2025 via Lauro's YouTube channel. The video was filmed at the Palazzo Poli and featured cameo by Lauro and Italian actress Celeste Dalla Porta. Some scenes were filmed inside the Trevi Fountain, and are inspired by scenes featuring Anita Ekberg and Marcello Mastroianni and their nighttime bathing in Federico Fellini's film La dolce vita.

== Charts ==
=== Weekly charts ===
Weekly chart performance for "Incoscienti giovani"
Chart (2025)	Peak position
Italy (FIMI)	3
Italy Airplay (EarOne)	1
Switzerland (Schweizer Hitparade)	28

=== Year-end charts ===
Year-end chart performance for "Incoscienti giovani"
Chart (2025)	Position
Italy (FIMI)	3

== Certifications ==
Certifications for "Incoscienti giovani"
Region	Certification	Certified units/sales
Italy (FIMI)	2× Platinum	400,000^{‡}
^{‡} Sales+streaming figures based on certification alone.
