= The Hand of God (film) =

2021 film by Paolo Sorrentino

- Release poster
- Italian: È stata la mano di Dio
- Directed by: Paolo Sorrentino
- Written by: Paolo Sorrentino
- Produced by: Lorenzo Mieli; Paolo Sorrentino
- Starring: Filippo Scotti; Toni Servillo; Teresa Saponangelo; Marlon Joubert; Luisa Ranieri; Renato Carpentieri; Massimiliano Gallo; Betti Pedrazzi; Enzo Decaro; Sofya Gershevich; Lino Musella; Biagio Manna; Roberto Oliveri
- Cinematography: Daria D'Antonio
- Edited by: Cristiano Travaglioli
- Music by: Lele Marchitelli
- Production company: The Apartment Pictures
- Distributed by: Lucky Red (Italy theatrical); Netflix (Worldwide)
- Release dates: 2 September 2021 (Venice); 24 November 2021
- Running time: 130 minutes
- Country: Italy
- Language: Italian

The Hand of God (Italian: È stata la mano di Dio, lit. 'It Was the Hand of God') is a 2021 Italian semi-autobiographical drama film written, directed, and produced by Paolo Sorrentino. Set in Naples, the film delves into Sorrentino's own youth. Its cast features Filippo Scotti, Toni Servillo, Teresa Saponangelo, Marlon Joubert, Luisa Ranieri, Renato Carpentieri, Massimiliano Gallo, Betti Pedrazzi, Enzo Decaro, Sofya Gershevich, Lino Musella, and Biagio Manna.

At the 78th Venice International Film Festival, it competed for the Golden Lion, winning the Grand Jury Prize; Scotti's performance earned him the Marcello Mastroianni Award. After a limited theatrical release on 24 November 2021, the film became available for streaming on Netflix on 15 December 2021. It received a nomination for Best International Feature Film at the 94th Academy Awards.

== Plot ==
In 1984 Naples, Fabietto Schisa enjoys a carefree adolescence with his close-knit family amidst eccentric relatives and friends. Their peace is shattered when his mother Maria's sister, Patrizia, faces abuse from her husband; his brother Marchino's acting dreams falter after a failed audition with Federico Fellini; and Maria discovers Saverio's infidelity.

Amid this turmoil, Napoli's acquisition of Diego Maradona brings hope and joy, especially for Fabietto, who finds solace in Maradona. Saverio and Maria reconcile, buying a villa in Roccaraso for family vacations. They invite Fabietto for a weekend getaway, but he declines to attend a Napoli-Empoli match.

Saverio and Maria die from a carbon monoxide leak at the villa. The loss devastates the Schisa siblings, especially Fabietto, who is not allowed to see his parents' bodies. He grapples with survivor's guilt but also gains a new perspective from his uncle Alfredo's belief that he was saved by "the hand of God". In his grief and confusion, Fabietto searches for meaning and direction.

Meanwhile, Patrizia is hospitalized in a psychiatric facility. During Fabietto's visit, she shares her story: she became miraculously pregnant after an encounter with Saint Gennaro and the "munaciello", but her husband's subsequent abuse led to a miscarriage. Feeling trapped, she chose hospitalization as an escape. This sparks Fabietto's desire to move to Rome. He has his first sexual encounter with an elderly neighbor, Baroness Focale, who empathizes with his struggles. He also befriends Armando, a smuggler, delving into the world of Neapolitan crime.

Fascinated by cinematography, inspired by film and by Yulia, an actress he meets at a street shoot in Naples, Fabietto dreams of studying it. Meanwhile, his relationships with Marchino and his sister Daniela sour: Marchino avoids the future, preferring to party, and Daniela reveals the existence of a boy born to a colleague with whom their father had a long affair. During a theatre performance by Yulia, director Antonio Capuano harshly criticizes her from the audience. Afterward, Fabietto discusses with Capuano his desire to study cinema in Rome, but Capuano sees it as an attempt to escape pain and advises Fabietto not to flee Naples but to embrace its stories.

Meanwhile, Napoli wins its first league title. Fabietto decides to go to Rome. On the train journey, he sees a "munaciello" at a desolate station, (Note: The sign indicates that it's the Formia-Gaeta station, but in reality, the scene was filmed at the Morcone station.) echoing his parents' affectionate whistle.

== Cast ==
- Filippo Scotti as Fabietto Schisa
- Toni Servillo as Saverio Schisa
- Teresa Saponangelo as Maria Schisa
- Luisa Ranieri as Patrizia
- Massimiliano Gallo as Franco
- Renato Carpentieri as Alfredo
- Ciro Capano as Antonio Capuano
- Marlon Joubert as Marchino Schisa
- Betti Pedrazzi as Baronessa Focale
- Biagio Manna as Armando
- Enzo De Caro as San Gennaro
- Sofya Gershevich as Yulia
- Roberto Oliveri as Maurizio
- Lino Musella as Mariettiello
- Cristiana Dell'Anna as Armando's sister
- Monica Nappo as Silvana
- Carmen Pommella as Annarella
- Adriano Saleri as Federico Fellini's assistant
- Alfonso Perugini as Dante Ferretti

== Production ==
In July 2020, it was announced that Paolo Sorrentino would write, direct, and produce the film, with Netflix attached to distribute. Sorrentino spent years gathering memories about his family, friends, and parents before writing the screenplay. Despite the extensive preparation, he wrote the script in just two weeks. That same month, a lawyer for Diego Maradona said he was considering legal action against the film for its title, as it was a reference to Maradona's 1986 FIFA World Cup goal against England, and use of Maradona's image was not authorized. Netflix responded that the film was not a sports film or about Maradona, and instead a personal story inspired by Sorrentino's youth. In September 2020, Toni Servillo joined the film's cast, and principal photography began in Naples that month.

== Release ==
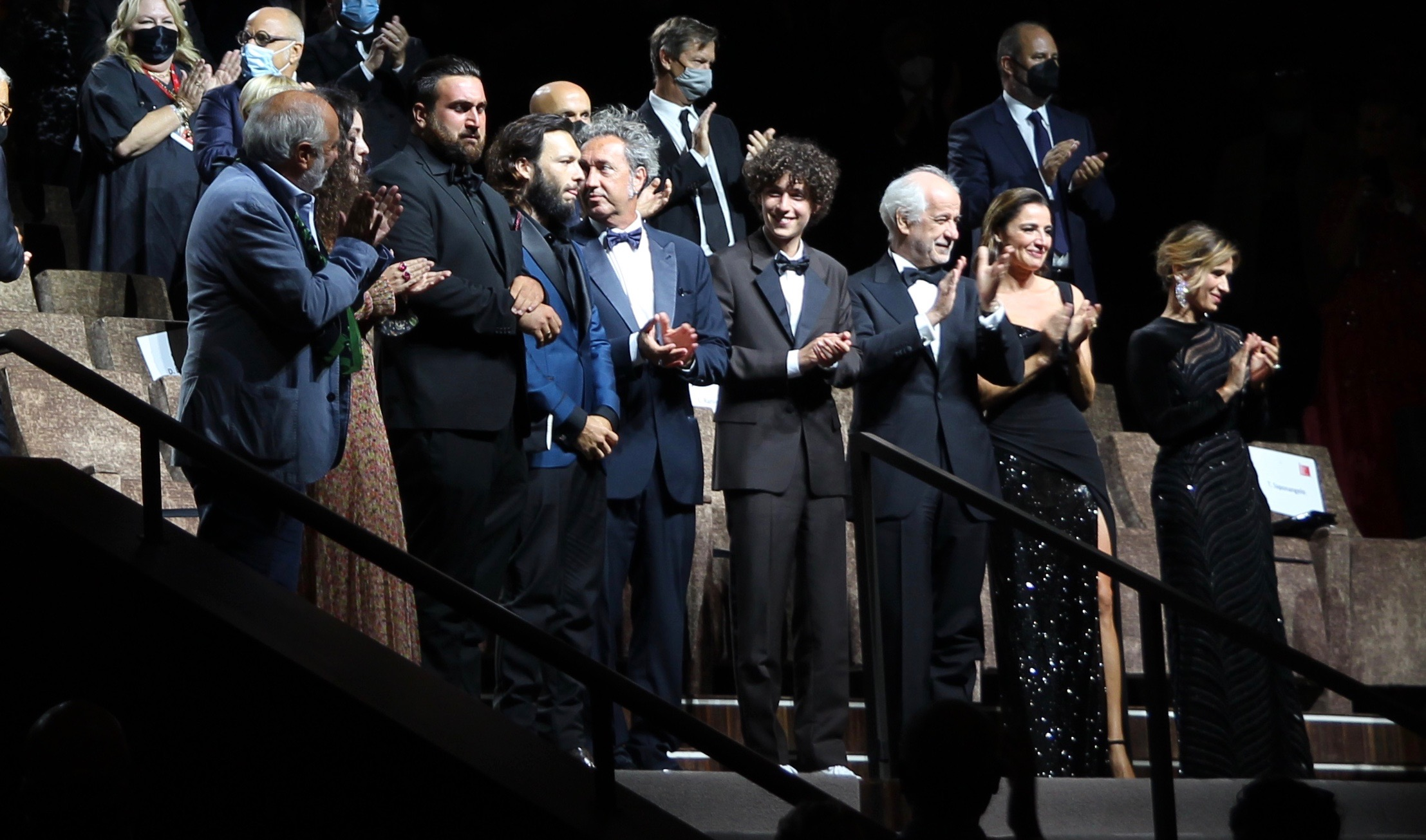
The cast along with the film's director Paolo Sorrentino during the première at the 2021 Venice Film Festival

The Hand of God had its world premiere at the 78th Venice International Film Festival on 2 September 2021. It became available worldwide on Netflix on 15 December 2021.

== Reception ==
=== Critical response ===
The film was mostly well received by critics. In The Guardian, Peter Bradshaw awarded the film four stars out of five, calling it an "extravagantly personal" film and saying it would be "obtuse not to marvel at the exuberance, energy and vivid moment-by-moment immediacy of this movie". The Independent also awarded the film four stars out of five. RogerEbert.com called the film quintessential Sorrentino, writing, "it's about finding character in unexpected places and making it seem both true to life and completely overwhelming" and praising Daria D'Antonio's cinematography. In The New York Times, A. O. Scott called the film "sensual, sad and occasionally sublime". Like many critics, he saw similarities between Sorrentino and Federico Fellini, writing, "if The Great Beauty, an Oscar winner in 2014, can be called Sorrentino’s La Dolce Vita, then this is his Amarcord" and "It’s a beautiful tautology: a true-to-life movie about a life made for movies." Filmmaker David O. Russell praised the film, saying, "If the best movies are graced by something divine as well as profane, this film may prove that there is a God, who does indeed work in very mysterious ways."

On the review aggregator website Rotten Tomatoes, the film holds an approval rating of 83% based on 156 reviews, with an average rating of 7.3/10. The website's critics consensus reads: "Although The Hand of God isn't Sorrentino's best work, this beautifully filmed coming-of-age story sings in a beguiling, albeit minor, key." Metacritic, which uses a weighted average, assigned the film a score of 76 out of 100, based on 36 critics, indicating "generally favorable" reviews.

=== Accolades ===
Award	Date of ceremony	Category	Recipient(s)	Result	Ref.
Academy Awards	27 March 2022	Best International Feature Film	Italy	Nominated	
AARP Movies for Grownups Awards	18 March 2022	Best Foreign Language Film	The Hand of God	Nominated	
BAFTA Awards	13 March 2022	Best Film Not In the English Language	The Hand of God	Nominated	
BAFTA Awards	13 March 2022	Best Casting	Annamaria Sambucco	Nominated	
Black Film Critics Circle Awards	22 December 2021	Best Foreign Language Film	The Hand of God	Won	
Capri Hollywood International Film Festival	4 January 2022	Best International Feature	The Hand of God	Won	
Capri Hollywood International Film Festival	4 January 2022	Best Director	Paolo Sorrentino	Won	
Capri Hollywood International Film Festival	4 January 2022	Breakout Actor of the Year	Filippo Scotti	Won	
Capri Hollywood International Film Festival	4 January 2022	European Feature Film of the Year	The Hand of God	Won	
Capri Hollywood International Film Festival	4 January 2022	European Director of the Year	Paolo Sorrentino	Won	
Capri Hollywood International Film Festival	4 January 2022	European Producer of the Year	Lorenzo Mieli	Won	
Capri Hollywood International Film Festival	4 January 2022	Italian Actor of the Year	Toni Servillo	Won	
Capri Hollywood International Film Festival	4 January 2022	Italian Actress of the Year	Teresa Saponangelo	Won	
Casting Society of America	17 March 2022	Outstanding Achievement in Casting - Studio or Independent Drama	Annamaria Sambucco	Nominated	
Critics Choice Movie Awards	13 March 2022	Best Foreign Language Film	The Hand of God	Nominated	
Dallas-Fort Worth Film Critics Association	20 December 2021	Best Foreign Language Film	The Hand of God	Nominated	
David di Donatello	3 May 2022	Best Film	The Hand of God	Won	
David di Donatello	3 May 2022	Best Director	Paolo Sorrentino	Won	
David di Donatello	3 May 2022	Best Original Screenplay	Paolo Sorrentino	Nominated	
David di Donatello	3 May 2022	Best Producer	Paolo Sorrentino & Lorenzo Mieli	Nominated	
David di Donatello	3 May 2022	Best Actor in a Leading Role	Filippo Scotti	Nominated	
David di Donatello	3 May 2022	Best Supporting Actress	Teresa Saponangelo	Won	
David di Donatello	3 May 2022	Best Supporting Actress	Luisa Ranieri	Nominated	
David di Donatello	3 May 2022	Best Supporting Actor	Toni Servillo	Nominated	
David di Donatello	3 May 2022	Best Cinematography	Daria D'Antonio	Won	
David di Donatello	3 May 2022	Best Costumes	Mariano Tufano	Nominated	
David di Donatello	3 May 2022	Best Editing	Cristiano Travaglioli	Nominated	
David di Donatello	3 May 2022	Best Production Design	Iole Autero & Carmine Guarino	Nominated	
David di Donatello	3 May 2022	Best Make-Up	Vincenzo Mastrantonio	Nominated	
David di Donatello	3 May 2022	Best Sound	The Hand of God	Nominated	
David di Donatello	3 May 2022	Best Visual Effects	Rodolfo Migliari	Nominated	
David di Donatello	3 May 2022	David Youth Award	The Hand of God	Won	
Dublin Film Critics' Circle	21 December 2021	Best Cinematography	Daria D'Antonio	Nominated	
European Film Awards	11 December 2021	Best Film	The Hand of God	Nominated	
European Film Awards	11 December 2021	Best Director	Paolo Sorrentino	Nominated	
European Film Awards	11 December 2021	Best Screenplay	Paolo Sorrentino	Nominated	
Florida Film Critics Circle Awards	22 December 2021	Best Foreign Language Film	The Hand of God	Won	
Georgia Film Critics Association	14 January 2022	Best Foreign Language Film	The Hand of God	Nominated	
Golden Globe Awards	9 January 2022	Best Foreign Language Film	The Hand of God	Nominated	
Golden Reel Awards	13 March 2022	Outstanding Achievement in Sound Editing – Foreign Language Feature	Silvia Moraes	Nominated	
Goya Awards	11 February 2023	Best European Film	The Hand of God	Nominated	
Hawaii Film Critics Society	14 January 2022	Best Foreign Language Film	The Hand of God	Won	
International Cinephile Society	6 February 2022	Best Breakthrough Performance	Filippo Scotti	Nominated	
Kansas City Film Critics Association	16 January 2022	Best Foreign Language Film	The Hand of God	Nominated	
London Film Critics' Circle	6 February 2022	Best Foreign Language Film	The Hand of God	Nominated	
London Film Festival	17 October 2021	Best Film	Paolo Sorrentino	Nominated	
Middleburg Film Festival	21 October 2021	International Spotlight Award	Paolo Sorrentino	Won	
Mill Valley Film Festival	17 October 2021	Festival Award	Paolo Sorrentino & Filippo Scotti	Won	
Music City Film Critics Association	25 January 2022	Best International Film	The Hand of God	Nominated	
Newport Beach Film Festival	28 October 2021	Best International Film	Paolo Sorrentino	Won	
North American Film Critic Association	6 February 2022	Best Cinematography	Daria D'Antonio	Nominated	
North American Film Critic Association	6 February 2022	Best Foreign Film	The Hand of God	Nominated	
North Dakota Film Society Awards	17 January 2022	Best International Feature	The Hand of God	Nominated	
Palm Springs International Film Festival	28 October 2021	Best Foreign Language Film	Paolo Sorrentino	Nominated	
Phoenix Critics Circle	18 December 2021	Best Foreign Language Film	The Hand of God	Nominated	
Phoenix Film Critics Society Awards	18 December 2021	Best Foreign Language Film	The Hand of God	Won	
Robert Awards	6 February 2022	Best Non-English Language Film	The Hand of God	Nominated	
Satellite Awards	2 April 2022	Best Foreign Language Film	The Hand of God	Nominated	
Seattle Film Critics Society	17 January 2022	Best Foreign Language Film	The Hand of God	Nominated	
Set Decorators Society of America	22 February 2022	Best Achievement in Decor/Design of a Feature Film - Contemporary	Iole Autero & Carmine Guarino	Nominated	
South African Online Film Critics	29 December 2021	Best International Feature Film	The Hand of God	Won	
St. Louis Film Critics Association Awards	19 December 2021	Best International Film	The Hand of God	Runner-up	
Sydney Film Festival	15 November 2021	Best Film	Paolo Sorrentino	Nominated	
Turkish Film Critics Association	17 January 2022	Best Streaming Film	The Hand of God	Nominated	
Venice Film Festival	11 September 2021	Golden Lion	Paolo Sorrentino	Nominated	
Venice Film Festival	11 September 2021	Grand Jury Prize	Paolo Sorrentino	Won	
Venice Film Festival	11 September 2021	Marcello Mastroianni Award	Filippo Scotti	Won	
Venice Film Festival	11 September 2021	Pasinetti Award for Best Film	Paolo Sorrentino	Won	
Venice Film Festival	11 September 2021	Pasinetti Award for Best Actress	Teresa Saponangelo	Won	

== See also ==
- List of submissions to the 94th Academy Awards for Best International Feature Film
- List of Italian submissions for the Academy Award for Best International Feature Film
