= Achille Lauro (singer) =

Italian singer-songwriter (born 1990)

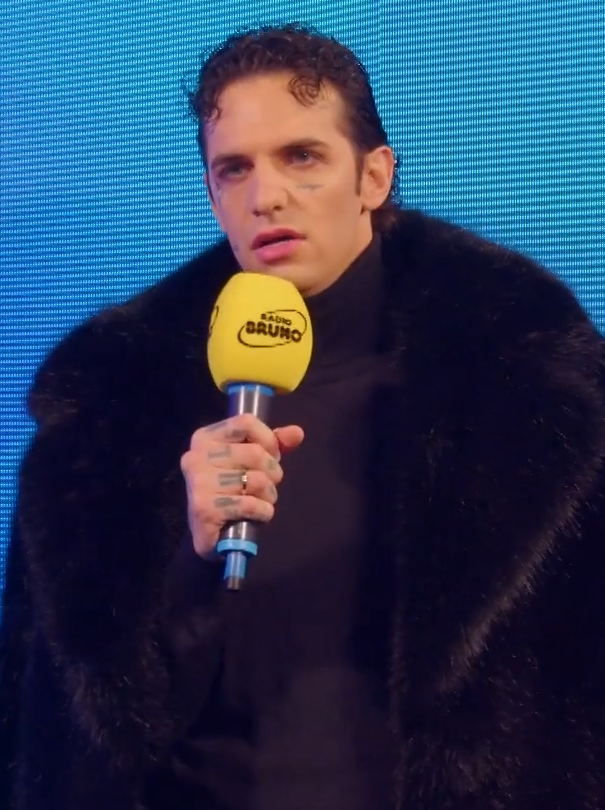
- Achille Lauro in February 2025

Background information
- Born: Lauro De Marinis; 11 July 1990 (age 36); Verona, Italy
- Genres: Pop; rock; hip hop
- Occupations: Singer; songwriter
- Instrument: Vocals
- Works: Discography
- Years active: 2012–present
- Labels: Honiro (2011–2012); Propaganda (2012–2013); Roccia Music / Universal Music Italia (2013–2015); No Face / Sony Music (2016–2019); Elektra (2019–2021); Warner Music Italy (2019–present); Atlantic Italy (2025–present)

Lauro De Marinis (Italian: [ˈlauro de maˈriːnis]; born 11 July 1990), known professionally as Achille Lauro (Italian: [aˈkille ˈlauro]), is an Italian singer-songwriter.

He gained popularity in the Italian hip hop scene and competed in the Sanremo Music Festival 2019 with the song "Rolls Royce", the 2020 edition with the song "Me ne frego", the 2022 edition with the song "Domenica", and at the 2025 edition with the song "Incoscienti giovani". He represented San Marino at the Eurovision Song Contest 2022 with the song "Stripper", after winning Una voce per San Marino, but failed to qualify for the final.

== Early life ==
Lauro De Marinis was born on 11 July 1990 in Verona. His father, Nicola De Marinis, is a professor and a magistrate on the Supreme Court of Cassation from Gravina in Puglia. His mother, Cristina Zambon, is now the administrator of Achille Lauro's holding company De Marinis Group. He grew up in Rome and at age 14 lived with his older brother, Federico, after his parents moved to another city.

== Career ==
=== 2012–2014: Career beginnings, Barabba, Harvard, and Achille Idol Immortale ===
Achille Lauro's brother, Federico, was a producer for Quarto Blocco and introduced Lauro to the world of underground rap music. De Marinis decided to use the stage name Achille Lauro after people associated his name Lauro with Achille Lauro, the owner of a cruise ship with the same name that was hijacked in 1985 and sank in 1994, throughout his childhood.

On 14 April 2012, Lauro released his first mixtape titled Barabba. This mixtape was available as a free download.

After signing with Roccia Music, Lauro's debut studio album Achille Idol Immortale was released on 27 February 2014 and featured artists such as Marracash, Gemitaiz, and Coez.

=== 2015–2018: Dio c'è, Ragazzi madre, and Pour l'amour ===
On 25 May 2015, Lauro's second studio album Dio c'è was released. The album peaked at 19 on the Italian music charts.

In June 2016, Lauro left Roccia Music. He created his own label called No Face Agency and released his third studio album Ragazzi madre in November of that year. This album peaked at 22 on the Italian music charts. This album was certified gold by the Federazione Industria Musicale Italiana in 2018.

In October 2017, Lauro signed with Sony Music. The following year, on 22 June, he released his fourth studio album Pour l'amour. This album peaked at 4 on the Italian music charts. This album was certified gold by FIMI in 2019. Multiple singles from this album also charted in Italy including "Amore mi", "Non sei come me", "Thoiry Remix (feat. Gemitaiz, Quentin40 and Puritano)", "Midnight Carnival (feat. Gow Tribe and Boss Doms)", "Ammò (feat. Clementino and Rocco Hunt)", and "Mamacita (feat. Vins)".

=== 2019–2021: Sanremo appearances, 1969, 1990, 1920, and Lauro ===
In December 2018, it was announced that Achille Lauro would participate in the Sanremo Music Festival 2019 with the song "Rolls Royce" and finished in 9th place.

Following his first Sanremo appearance, he released his fifth studio album 1969 on 12 April 2019. 1969 is his best-selling album to date, being certified 2× platinum by FIMI in 2021. This album peaked at 3 on the Italian music charts and had multiple singles that charted in Italy including "C'est la vie" and his Sanremo entry "Rolls Royce", which also was certified platinum in Italy. In 2020, this album was re-issued as 1969: Achille Idol Rebirth.

In December 2019, it was announced that Achille Lauro would participate in the Sanremo Music Festival for the second time with the song "Me ne frego". He finished in 8th place. The song peaked at 4 in the Italian charts and was certified 2× platinum.

In 2020, it was announced that Achille Lauro would become the Chief Creative Director of Elektra Records/Warner Music Italy. On 24 July of that year, Lauro released sixth studio album 1990, which was his first album to reach number 1 on the Italian charts and was certified gold in 2021. At the end of the year, on 4 December 2020, Lauro released his seventh studio album 1920. The album peaked at 13 on the Italian charts.

In 2021, Lauro appeared at the Sanremo Music Festival for the third time, but as a guest instead of a competing entry. On 16 April 2021, he released his eighth studio album Lauro. The album peaked at number 1 in Italy and the singles "Solo noi" and "Marilù" from the album also charted. The album was re-issued as Lauro: Achille Idol Superstar in 2022. In June 2021, he, along with Fedez and Orietta Berti, released the song "Mille". This song was a massive hit in Italy, peaking at number 1 for five weeks and being certified 6× platinum.

=== 2022–present: Sanremo, Una voce per San Marino, and Eurovision ===
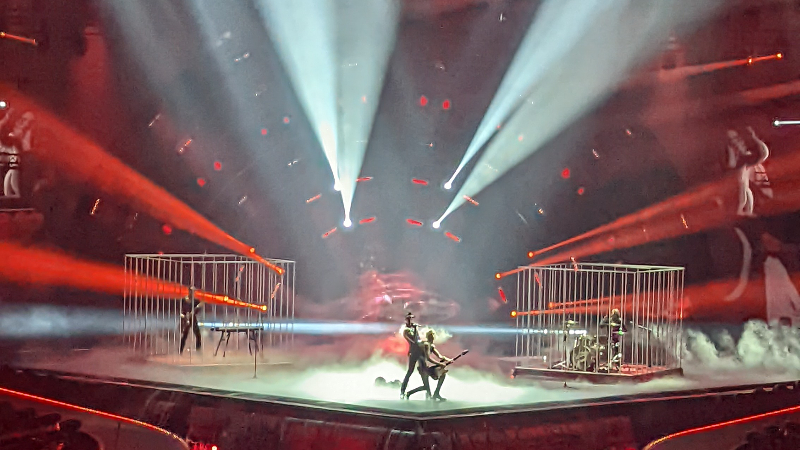
Achille Lauro performing at the Eurovision Song Contest 2022

In December 2021, it was announced that Lauro would compete at the Sanremo Music Festival for the third time with the song "Domenica". Performing alongside the Harlem Gospel Choir, Lauro eventually finished in fourteenth place. A few days after Sanremo 2022, it was announced that Lauro would be participating as an established artist in the final of Una voce per San Marino, the Sammarinese national final to determine their entry for the Eurovision Song Contest 2022. Performing the song "Stripper", Lauro won Una voce per San Marino by one point. He represented San Marino at the 2022 contest in Turin and did not qualify for the final. He also went on a nationwide tour to promote the re-issue of his 2021 self-titled album Lauro in the summer of 2022.

In December 2024, Lauro was announced as one of the participants in the Sanremo Music Festival 2025. He placed 7th with the song "Incoscienti giovani". The audience booed for Achille Lauro and Giorgia's positioning out of the top 5. Lauro co-hosted the second night of the 2026 Festival on 25 February 2026. He performed during the 2026 Winter Olympics closing ceremony in Verona, Italy.

== Musical style ==
On several occasions, Lauro has declared that he is not very close, in terms of tastes, to Italian rap, as he does not like to be homologated to the well-known stereotype of the street rapper. In fact, he has always deviated from the canonical look of hip hop artists, causing a scandal for his eccentric aesthetics in terms of clothing.

He said he was happy to follow his compatriot Ghali, but above all the Americans Travis Scott, 6lack and Young Thug. Lauro said he is a huge fan of Vasco Rossi, Kurt Cobain, Elvis Presley and The Beatles. Among his influences, he cites to have been inspired by singer-songwriters Lucio Battisti and Rino Gaetano in reference to his rock turning point. He considers himself "a believer in God".

== Controversy ==
=== Sanremo 2019 ===
At the Sanremo Music Festival 2019, Lauro's song "Rolls Royce" caused controversy as Striscia la notizia speculated that the song was about drugs, specifically ecstasy, due to references in the song of famous artists who were known to have taken drugs including Amy Winehouse and Jim Morrison. According to journalist Gabriele Antonucci from Panorama, the song was actually about the dream of social redemption.

=== Sanremo 2022 ===
At the Sanremo Music Festival 2022, Lauro's performance of "Domenica" caused controversy since he performed a fake baptism during his performance, which led to the bishop of Sanremo, Antonio Suetta, protesting the performance. Suetta described the performance as containing "words, attitudes and gestures that are not just offensive to religion, but to human dignity" and also stated that he felt that he could not stay silent about the performance since RAI, the state-owned Italian broadcasting company, broadcast a performance that "mocked and profaned the sacred signs of the Catholic faith by evoking the gesture of Baptism in a dull and desecrating context". On the other hand, L'Osservatore Romano, the official newspaper of the Vatican, stated that they were not upset by Lauro's performance, because "the singer went back to the Catholic imagination. Nothing new. There has not been a more transgressive message in history than that of the Gospel", adding also, after a comparison to David Bowie's recital of the Lord's Prayer, that "nowadays the offenders are not what they used to be".

== Discography ==
- Achille Idol immortale (2014)
- Dio c'è (2015)
- Ragazzi madre (2016)
- Pour l'amour (2018)
- 1969 (2019)
- Lauro (2021)
- Comuni mortali (2025)

== Filmography ==
=== Films ===
Year	Title	Role(s)	Notes
2018	Terrurismo	Himself	Short film; also producer
2019	Happy Birthday	Singer at party	Short film
2019	UglyDolls	Lucky Bat (voice)	Italian voice-over
2019	No face 1	None	Only co-director
2021	Ritorno al crimine	Himself	Cameo appearance
2021	Dog Years	Himself	Cameo appearance
2023	Ragazzi madre – L'Illiade	None	Only director and producer

=== Television ===
Year	Title	Role(s)	Notes
2017	Pechino Express	Contestant	Reality show (season 6), 3rd place
2019	Sanremo Music Festival 2019	Contestant	Performing "Rolls Royce"
2019	Extra Factor	Presenter	Daytime of X Factor
2019	Imma Tataranni: Deputy Prosecutor	Himself	Episode: "Come piante fra i sassi"
2020	Sanremo Music Festival 2020	Contestant	Performing "Me ne frego"
2021	Celebrity Hunted: Caccia all'uomo	Contestant	Reality show (season 2), 4th place
2021	Sanremo Music Festival 2021	Regular guest	Performing and co-hosting
2022	Sanremo Music Festival 2022	Contestant	Performing "Domenica"
2022	Una voce per San Marino 2022	Contestant	Performing "Stripper"
2022	Eurovision Song Contest 2022	Contestant	Representing San Marino
2022	Prisma	Himself	Episode: "Viola"
2023	Sanremo Music Festival 2023	Special guest	Performing a medley of his songs on the Suzuki Stage in Piazza Colombo
2023	Pesci piccoli - Un'agenzia, molte idee, poco budget	Himself	Cameo appearance
2024–2025	X Factor	Judge	Season 18–season 19
2025	Sanremo Music Festival 2025	Contestant	Performing "Incoscienti giovani"
2026	Sanremo Music Festival 2026	Co-host	Annual song contest

Awards and achievements
Preceded by Senhit and Flo Rida with "Adrenalina"	San Marino in the Eurovision Song Contest; 2022	Succeeded by Piqued Jacks with "Like an Animal"
