= The Voice Kids (Italian TV series) season 4 =

The Voice Kids
- Season 4
- Promotional poster featuring coaches (clockwise from left) Nek, Clementino & Hunt, Bertè, and Arisa
- Presented by: Antonella Clerici
- Coaches: Clementino & Rocco Hunt; Arisa; Nek; Loredana Bertè
- Winner: Matteo Trullu
- Winning coach: Nek
- Runners-up: Briana Samira Camara; Andrea Ronga; Francesca Lanza

Release
- Original network: Rai 1
- Original release: 10 January – 14 February 2026

Season chronology
- ← Previous; Season 3

The fourth season of the Italian singing competition The Voice Kids began airing on 10 January 2026, on Rai 1. Shortly prior to the season airing, the panel was confirmed to be the same as the sixth season of The Voice Senior. Arisa and Loredana Bertè returned as coaches from the previous season, along with Clementino who, this season, became a duo coach with Rocco Hunt. Meanwhile, Nek replaced exiting coach Gigi D'Alessio. Additionally, Antonella Clerici returned for her fourth consecutive season as host.

Thirteen-year-old Matteo Trullu won the season on 14 February, marking Nek's first win as a coach on The Voice Kids (his second overall after his win on the sixth season of The Voice Senior). Nek also became the first coach on The Voice Kids to win on their debut season. Trullu was later selected to represent Italy in the Junior Eurovision Song Contest 2026.

== Coaches ==
The Voice Kids season 4 coaches

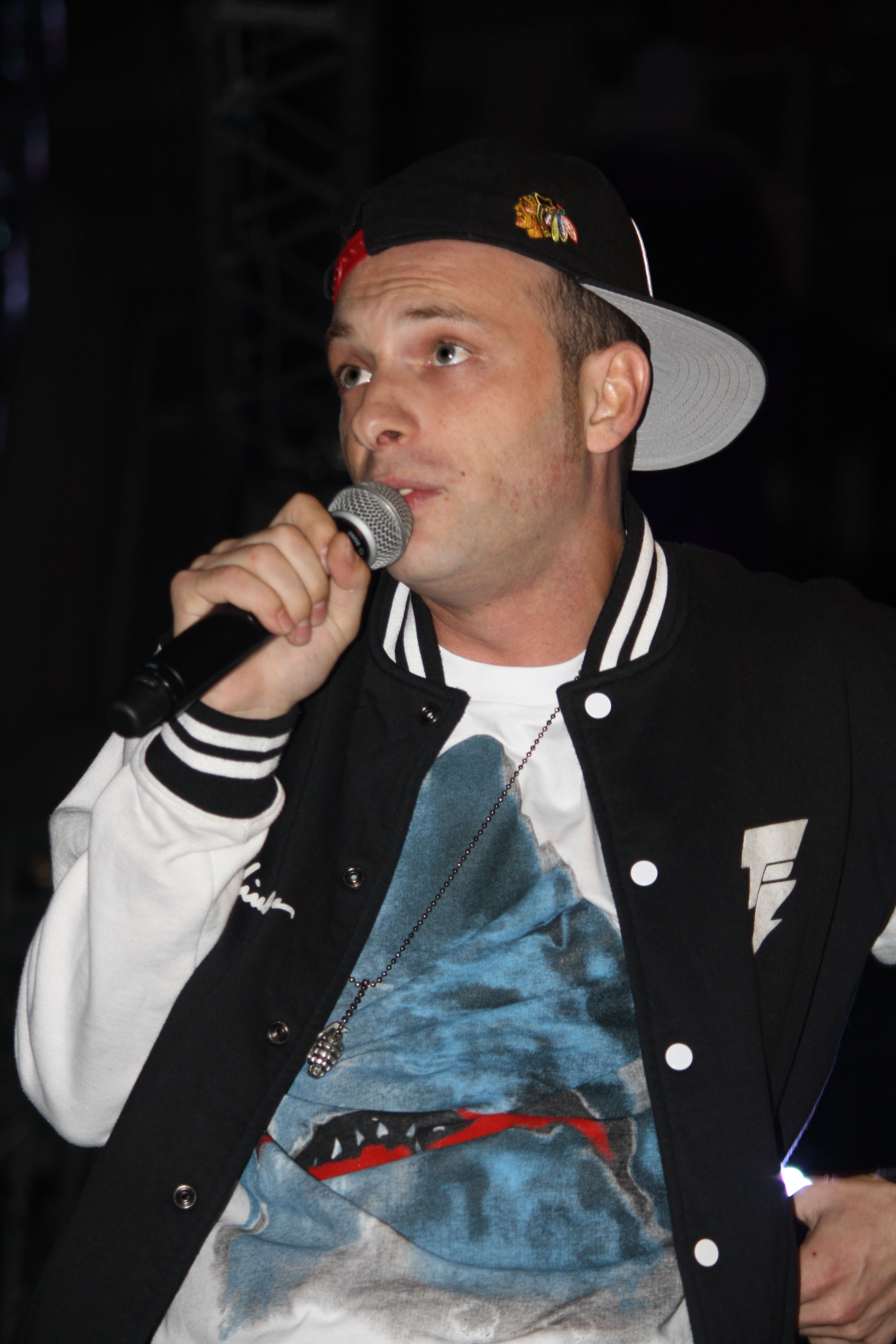
Clementino (duo)

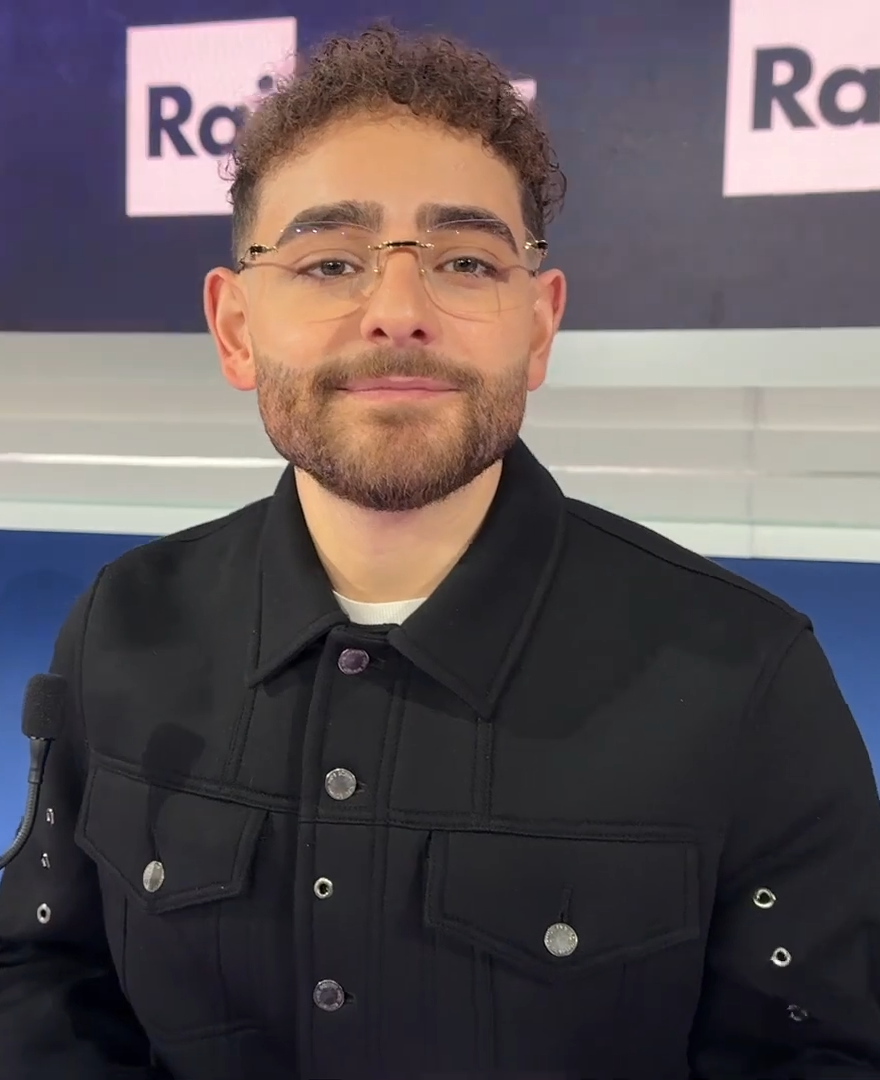
Rocco Hunt (duo)

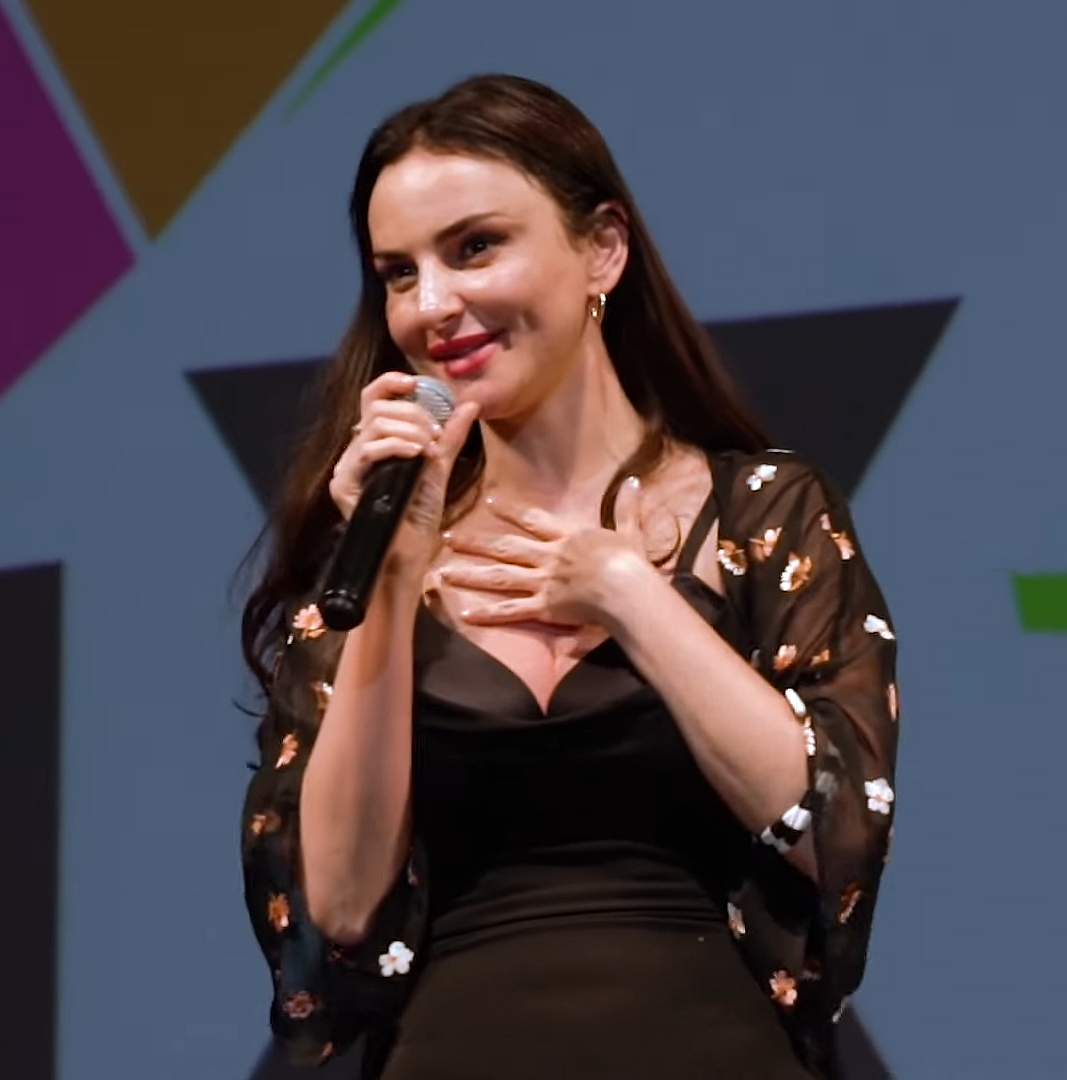
Arisa

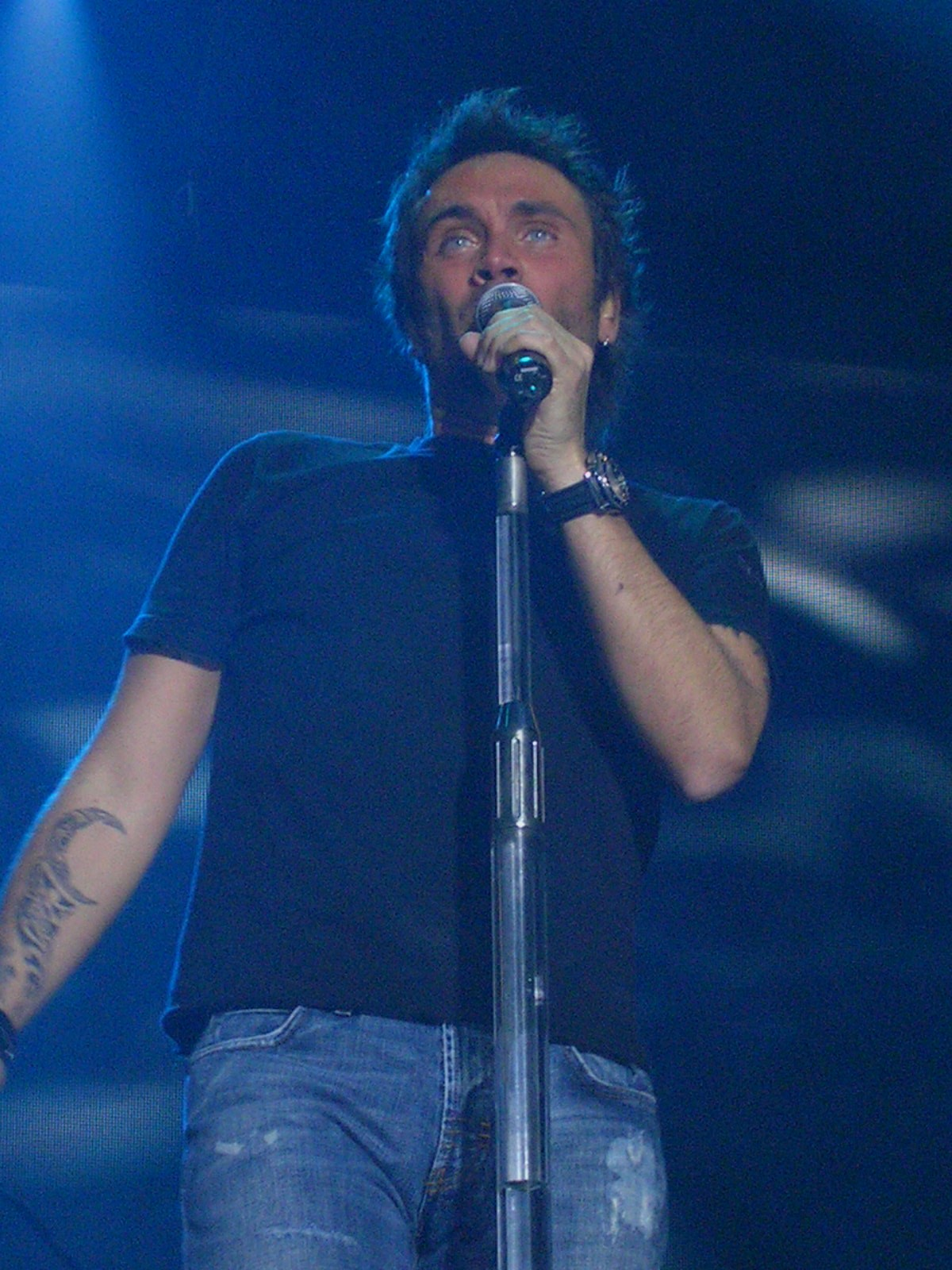
Nek

Loredana Bertè

Following the conclusion of the sixth season of The Voice Senior in late 2025, Rai 1 announced that The Voice Kids would be next to air in early 2026. It was confirmed shortly after that Loredana Bertè and Arisa would return for their fourth and third seasons on the show, respectively. Clementino also returned for his fourth season, but joined this season as a duo coach with Rocco Hunt. Gigi D'Alessio exited the panel this season and was replaced by coach Nek; the panel this season is the same as the sixth season of The Voice Senior.

== Teams ==
- Winner
- Finalists
- Eliminated in the Final
- Eliminated in the Battles

Coaches	Top 40 Artists				
Clementino & Rocco Hunt	Andrea Ronga	Annagiulia Fusco	Francesco Ambrosi	Raffaello Digilio	Davide Falciasecca
Clementino & Rocco Hunt	Francesco Halilaj	Gabriele Lanciotti	Graziano Caforio	Michela Salluce	Patrizia Vavassori
Arisa	Francesca Lanza	Fabiana Andreone	Ginevra Sergio	Maria Rosaria Rondina	Anna Tiozzo Canela
Arisa	Chiara Fraiegari	Gabriele Angelo Montalva	Lavinia Gorirossi	Rebecca Badaloni	Viola Bellini
Nek	Matteo Trullu	Giovanni Frassi	Leonardo Zambelli	Miriam Bruno	Adriana Anais Agnello
Nek	Alessia Cecere	Emma Metrangolo	Giacomo Bottiglioni	Silvia Ferraro	Ylenia Damiani
Loredana Bertè	Briana Samira Camara	Emma Baggetta	Maya Verga	Riccardo Pezzicoli	Chiara Adrianne Mazzella
Loredana Bertè	Enola Carbonaro	Ginevra Cardella	Martina Galia	Serena Marku	Simona Forte
Note: Bold names are recipients of the 'Super Pass'.

== Blind auditions ==
The blind auditions premiered on 10 January 2026. Each coach must have nine artists on their team at the end of the blind auditions. Each coach is given one "block" to use in the entirety of the blind auditions. Additionally, each coach has one "super pass" to award to an artist which defaults the artist to their team and automatically advances them to the final.

Blind auditions color key
✔	Coach pressed "I WANT YOU" button
	Artist defaulted to a coach's team
	Artist elected this coach's team
	Artist eliminated as no coach pressed their button
	Artist received the "Super Pass" and advanced to the final
✘	Coach pressed "I WANT YOU" button, but was blocked by Cleme & Rocco
✘	Coach pressed "I WANT YOU" button, but was blocked by Arisa
✘	Coach pressed "I WANT YOU" button, but was blocked by Nek
✘	Coach pressed "I WANT YOU" button, but was blocked by Loredana

Blind auditions results
Episode	Order	Artist	Age	Hometown	Song	Coach's and contestant's choices			
Episode	Order	Artist	Age	Hometown	Song	Cleme & Rocco	Arisa	Nek	Loredana
Episode 1 (10 January)	1	Francesca Lanza	12	Caltagirone	"Nel blu, dipinto di blu"	✔	✔	✔	✔
Episode 1 (10 January)	2	Giovanni Frassi	11	Pisogne	"Ovunque sarai"	✔	—	✔	—
Episode 1 (10 January)	3	Emma Baggetta	13	Reggio Calabria	"E poi"	✘	✘	✘	✔
Episode 1 (10 January)	4	Raffaello Digilio	10	Matera	"I tuoi particolari"	✔	—	✔	—
Episode 1 (10 January)	5	Emma Metrangolo	10	Sant'Angelo Lodigiano	"La prima cosa bella"	✔	✔	✔	—
Episode 1 (10 January)	6	Maya Verga	10	Cadorago	"La mia storia tra le dita"	✔	✔	✔	✔
Episode 1 (10 January)	7	Alessio Lapertosa	11	Bari	"Se bruciasse la città"	—	—	—	—
Episode 1 (10 January)	8	Alessia Cecere	14	Borgoricco	"Se telefonando"	✔	✘	✔	✔
Episode 1 (10 January)	9	Francesco Halilaj	10	Sora	"T'appartengo"	✔	✔	✔	✔
Episode 1 (10 January)	10	Graziano Caforio	14	Pavia	"Portami a ballare"	✔	—	—	—
Episode 1 (10 January)	11	Andrea Motta	11	Turin	"Balorda nostalgia"	—	—	—	—
Episode 1 (10 January)	12	Serena Marku	11	Grosseto	"I Wanna Dance with Somebody"	—	—	✔	✔
Episode 2 (17 January)	1	Ginevra Cardella	12	Palermo	"Un'emozione da poco"	✔	✔	✔	✔
Episode 2 (17 January)	2	Gabriele Angelo Montalva	13	Bassano in Teverina	"My Way"	✔	✔	✔	✔
Episode 2 (17 January)	3	Adriana Anais Agnello	7	Catania	"(Out Here) On My Own"	—	—	✔	✔
Episode 2 (17 January)	4	Leonardo Zambelli	10	Genoa	"Volevo essere un duro"	✔	✔	✔	✔
Episode 2 (17 January)	5	Anna Tiozzo Canela	8	Chioggia	"Meraviglioso amore mio"	✔	✔	✔	✔
Episode 2 (17 January)	6	Davide Rossoni	12	Milan	"Come mai"	—	—	—	—
Episode 2 (17 January)	7	Ginevra Sergio	13	Cavallino	"Amare"	—	✔	✘	✘
Episode 2 (17 January)	8	Davide Scalzo	11	Lamezia Terme	"A me mi piace"	—	—	—	—
Episode 2 (17 January)	9	Briana Samira Camara	11	Montemurlo	"Beat It"	✔	✔	✔	✔
Episode 2 (17 January)	10	Andrea Ronga	13	Pozzuoli	" Nu juorno buono"	✔	✔	✔	✔
Episode 2 (17 January)	11	Maksym Zhukovskyi	13	Cerveteri	"Born with a Broken Heart"	—	—	—	—
Episode 2 (17 January)	12	Riccardo Pezzicoli	12	Limbiate	"Melodrama"	✔	—	—	✔
Episode 2 (17 January)	13	Michela Salluce	11	Pomarico	"If I Ain't Got You"	✔	—	✔	—
Episode 3 (24 January)	1	Francesco Ambrosi	12	Fiuggi	"Se t'innamori muori"	✔	✔	—	✔
Episode 3 (24 January)	2	Ylenia Damiani	11	Gravina in Puglia	"Eco"	✔	✔	✔	✔
Episode 3 (24 January)	3	Martina Galia	11	Trapani	"La cura per me"	✔	✘	✔	✔
Episode 3 (24 January)	4	Lavinia Gorirossi	11	Cagliari	"Easy on Me"	✔	✔	✔	✔
Episode 3 (24 January)	5	Rebecca Badaloni	13	Novara	"La donna cannone"	✔	✔	✔	—
Episode 3 (24 January)	6	Paolo Mazza	9	Marino	"The Show Must Go On"	—	—	—	—
Episode 3 (24 January)	7	Simona Forte	12	Terrasini	"Luce (Tramonti a nord est)"	✔	✘	✔	✔
Episode 3 (24 January)	8	Miriam Bruno	12	Montalto Uffugo	"Bring Me to Life"	✘	✘	✔	✘
Episode 3 (24 January)	9	Giuseppe Bucolo	14	Calatabiano	"Pianeti"	—	—	—	—
Episode 3 (24 January)	10	Gabriele Lanciotti	13	Senigallia	"Supereroi"	✔	✔	✔	—
Episode 3 (24 January)	11	Patrizia Vavassori	13	Alzano Lombardo	"Vertebre"	✔	✔	✔	✔
Episode 3 (24 January)	12	Serena Castellani	13	Cantù	"Anema e core"	—	—	—	—
Episode 3 (24 January)	13	Fabiana Andreone	14	Giugliano in Campania	"Hurt"	✔	✔	✔	✔
Episode 4 (31 January)	1	Giacomo Bottiglioni	9	Carcare	"Pastello bianco"	✔	—	✔	—
Episode 4 (31 January)	2	Chiara Fraiegari	13	Paliano	"Canta ancora"	✔	✔	✔	✔
Episode 4 (31 January)	3	Davide Falciasecca	12	Pesaro	"Esseri umani"	✔	—	—	✔
Episode 4 (31 January)	4	Viola Bellini	10	San Giorgio Bigarello	"Meravigliosa creatura"	✔	✔	—	✔
Episode 4 (31 January)	5	Emanuele Zollino	13	Gallipoli	"Dieci ragazze"	—	—	—	—
Episode 4 (31 January)	6	Silvia Ferraro	13	Palmi	"La musica è finita"	✔	✔	✔	—
Episode 4 (31 January)	7	Annagiulia Fusco	11	Sora	"Human"	✔	—	✘	✘
Episode 4 (31 January)	8	Maria Rosaria Rondina	12	Benevento	"Due vite"	Team full	✔	✔	✔
Episode 4 (31 January)	9	Enola Carbonaro	13	Pozzallo	"Smooth Operator"	Team full	Team full	✔	✔
Episode 4 (31 January)	10	Tommaso Bandini	14	Montignoso	"Tu con chi fai l'amore"	Team full	Team full	—	—
Episode 4 (31 January)	11	Matteo Trullu	13	Decimomannu	"Bohemian Rhapsody"	Team full	Team full	✔	✔
Episode 4 (31 January)	12	Nicolò Loche	10	Olbia	"90min"	Team full	Team full	Team full	—
Episode 4 (31 January)	13	Chiara Adrianne Mazzella	13	Ischia	"Brava"	Team full	Team full	Team full	✔

== Battles ==
The battles, also dubbed as the semi-final, saw the 36 remaining contestants compete, which determined the 16 young finalists of the program. The challenges took place between three competitors from the same team who each battle performing the track assigned to them by their coach, who at the end of the performances decided the finalist of the three, eliminating the other two. At the end of the challenges, three competitors per team made it to the final, joining the finalist decreed at the Blind Auditions, through the use of the Super Pass. The battles aired on February 7, 2026.

Artist won the battle and advanced to the final
Artist lost the battle and was eliminated

Episode	Coach	Order	Artist	Song	Result
Episode 5 (7 February)	Nek	1	Silvia Ferraro	"Il cielo in una stanza"	Eliminated
Episode 5 (7 February)	Nek	2	Giacomo Bottiglioni	"Un mondo a parte"	Eliminated
Episode 5 (7 February)	Nek	3	Giovanni Frassi	"Non dirgli mai"	Advanced
Episode 5 (7 February)	Arisa	4	Francesca Lanza	"Nessun dolore"	Advanced
Episode 5 (7 February)	Arisa	5	Lavinia Gorirossi	"Tintarella di luna"	Eliminated
Episode 5 (7 February)	Arisa	6	Chiara Fraiegari	"Tutta colpa mia"	Eliminated
Episode 5 (7 February)	Clementino & Rocco Hunt	7	Francesco Ambrosi	"Caruso"	Advanced
Episode 5 (7 February)	Clementino & Rocco Hunt	8	Davide Falciasecca	"Fai rumore"	Eliminated
Episode 5 (7 February)	Clementino & Rocco Hunt	9	Graziano Caforio	"Perdere l'amore"	Eliminated
Episode 5 (7 February)	Loredana Bertè	10	Ginevra Cardella	"A mano a mano"	Eliminated
Episode 5 (7 February)	Loredana Bertè	11	Maya Verga	"Vivimi"	Advanced
Episode 5 (7 February)	Loredana Bertè	12	Chiara Adrianne Mazzella	"Hopelessly Devoted to You"	Eliminated
Episode 5 (7 February)	Arisa	13	Fabiana Andreone	"Di sole e d'azzurro"	Advanced
Episode 5 (7 February)	Arisa	14	Anna Tiozzo Canela	"Voilà"	Eliminated
Episode 5 (7 February)	Arisa	15	Viola Bellini	"Quando nasce un amore"	Eliminated
Episode 5 (7 February)	Loredana Bertè	16	Serena Marku	"Run to You"	Eliminated
Episode 5 (7 February)	Loredana Bertè	17	Martina Galia	"La tua ragazza sempre"	Eliminated
Episode 5 (7 February)	Loredana Bertè	18	Briana Samira Camara	"Girls Just Want to Have Fun"	Advanced
Episode 5 (7 February)	Nek	19	Adriana Anais Agnello	"Ci pensiamo domani"	Eliminated
Episode 5 (7 February)	Nek	20	Matteo Trullu	"Maniac"	Advanced
Episode 5 (7 February)	Nek	21	Alessia Cecere	"Comunque andare"	Eliminated
Episode 5 (7 February)	Clementino & Rocco Hunt	22	Raffaello Digilio	"Una finestra tra le stelle"	Advanced
Episode 5 (7 February)	Clementino & Rocco Hunt	23	Patrizia Vavassori	"Dimmi come..."	Eliminated
Episode 5 (7 February)	Clementino & Rocco Hunt	24	Gabriele Lanciotti	"Il filo rosso"	Eliminated
Episode 5 (7 February)	Arisa	25	Rebecca Badaloni	"Incancellabile"	Eliminated
Episode 5 (7 February)	Arisa	26	Gabriele Angelo Montalva	"Die with a Smile"	Eliminated
Episode 5 (7 February)	Arisa	27	Maria Rosaria Rondina	"O forse sei tu"	Advanced
Episode 5 (7 February)	Nek	28	Ylenia Damiani	"Bruci la città"	Eliminated
Episode 5 (7 February)	Nek	29	Emma Betrangolo	"Si Antes Te Hubiera Conocido"	Eliminated
Episode 5 (7 February)	Nek	30	Leonardo Zambelli	"Incoscienti giovani"	Advanced
Episode 5 (7 February)	Loredana Bertè	31	Enola Carbonaro	"Careless Whisper"	Eliminated
Episode 5 (7 February)	Loredana Bertè	32	Riccardo Pezzicoli	"Ciao ciao"	Advanced
Episode 5 (7 February)	Loredana Bertè	33	Simona Forte	"Over the Rainbow"	Eliminated
Episode 5 (7 February)	Clementino & Rocco Hunt	34	Michela Salluce	"La voce del silenzio"	Eliminated
Episode 5 (7 February)	Clementino & Rocco Hunt	35	Francesco Halilaj	"Vieni nel mio cuore"	Eliminated
Episode 5 (7 February)	Clementino & Rocco Hunt	36	Andrea Ronga	"Stan"	Advanced

== Final ==
The final, aired on February 14, consisted of two rounds. In the first phase of the final, the sixteen talents who reached the final must perform a cover assigned by their coach. At the end of the first phase, only four, one from each team, will advance on the second phase of the final. At the end of the second and final phase, the winner of the fourth season of The Voice Kids was announced.

First round

Artist advanced to the Top 4
Artist was eliminated

Episode	Coach	Order	Artist	Song	Result
Episode 6 (February 14)	Arisa	1	Francesca Lanza	"Ti sento"	Advanced
Episode 6 (February 14)	Clementino & Rocco Hunt	2	Francesco Ambrosi	"Capolavoro"	Eliminated
Episode 6 (February 14)	Loredana Bertè	3	Briana Samira Camara	"The Way You Make Me Feel"	Advanced
Episode 6 (February 14)	Nek	4	Giovanni Frassi	"Vent'anni"	Eliminated
Episode 6 (February 14)	Loredana Bertè	5	Emma Baggetta	"I Say a Little Prayer"	Eliminated
Episode 6 (February 14)	Loredana Bertè	6	Maya Verga	"Città vuota"	Eliminated
Episode 6 (February 14)	Arisa	7	Maria Rosaria Rondina	"Se piovesse il tuo nome"	Eliminated
Episode 6 (February 14)	Clementino & Rocco Hunt	8	Andrea Ronga	"Changes"	Advanced
Episode 6 (February 14)	Arisa	9	Ginevra Sergio	"La rondine"	Eliminated
Episode 6 (February 14)	Clementino & Rocco Hunt	10	Raffaello Digilio	"Rondini al guinzaglio"	Eliminated
Episode 6 (February 14)	Nek	11	Miriam Bruno	"Basket Case"	Eliminated
Episode 6 (February 14)	Arisa	12	Fabiana Andreone	"In assenza di te"	Eliminated
Episode 6 (February 14)	Nek	13	Matteo Trullu	"Somebody to Love"	Advanced
Episode 6 (February 14)	Nek	14	Leonardo Zambelli	"I migliori anni della nostra vita"	Eliminated
Episode 6 (February 14)	Clementino & Rocco Hunt	15	Annagiulia Fusco	"I'm Not the Only One"	Eliminated
Episode 6 (February 14)	Loredana Bertè	16	Riccardo Pezzicoli	"Pazza musica"	Eliminated

Second round

Winner
Finalists

Episode	Coach	Order	Artist	Song	Result
Episode 6 (February 14)	Loredana Bertè	1	Briana Samira Camira	"Girls Just Want to Have Fun"	Finalists
Episode 6 (February 14)	Clementino & Rocco Hunt	2	Andrea Ronga	"Stan"	Finalists
Episode 6 (February 14)	Arisa	3	Francesca Lanza	"Nel blu, dipinto di blu"	Finalists
Episode 6 (February 14)	Nek	4	Matteo Trullu	"Maniac"	Winner
