= The Voice Kids (Italian TV series) season 2 =

The Voice Kids
- Season 2
- Presented by: Antonella Clerici
- Coaches: Arisa; Clementino; Gigi D'Alessio; Loredana Bertè
- Winner: Simone Grande
- Winning coach: Clementino
- Runners-up: Emma Buscaglia; Lucia Solazzo; Desiree Malizia

Release
- Original network: Rai 1
- Original release: November 24 – December 22, 2023

Season chronology
- ← Previous; Season 1 Next → Season 3

The second edition of The Voice Kids aired in prime time on Rai 1 from November 24 to December 22, 2023, for five episodes with the hosting of Antonella Clerici. New in this edition, in addition to the entry of the new coach Arisa, were two new tools, which could be used during the three episodes of Blind Auditions: the "Super Pass" and the "Super Block". The first guaranteed a competitor to go directly to the final, while the second was the classic "Block", which could only be used after the other coaches have turned around, allowing the prevention of another coach from choosing a competitor.

The winner, eleven-year old Simone Grande, was decided through the vote of the audience in the studio. He is the first male to win in the Kids version. This marked Clementino's first win on the kids' version of the show (his second after his win on the third edition of The Voice Senior).

Grande would go on to be selected to represent Italy in the Junior Eurovision Song Contest 2024; Clerici previously revealed that one of the show's twelve finalists would go on to represent Italy in the 2024 contest during the final of The Voice Kids.

== Coaches ==
The coaches of the second season of The Voice Kids were Clementino, Gigi D'Alessio and Loredana Bertè, who returned for their second seasons. Alongside them Arisa debuted.

The Voice Kids season 2 coaches

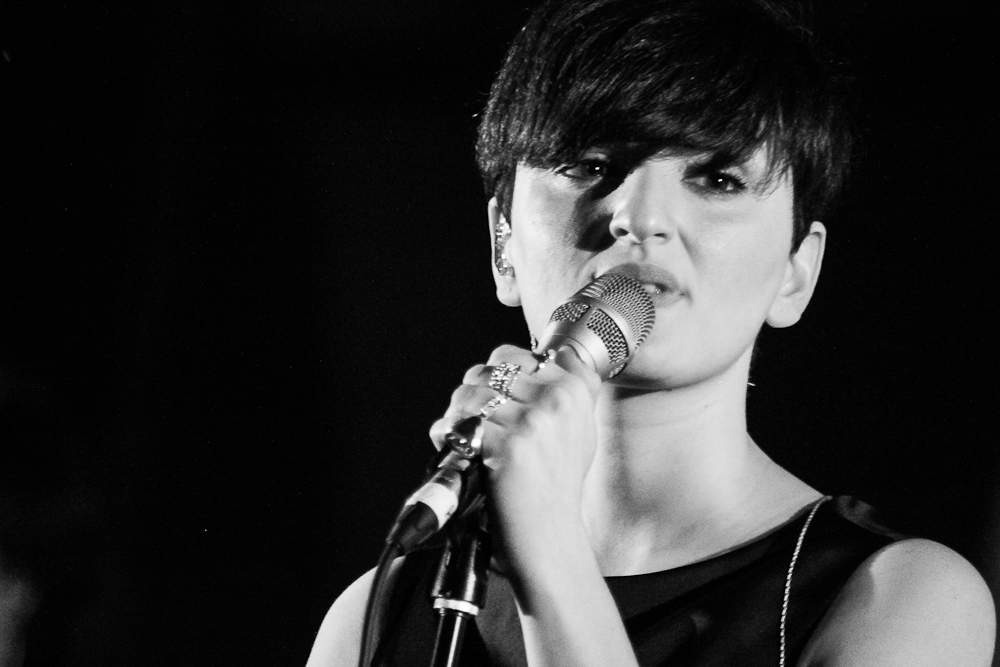
Arisa

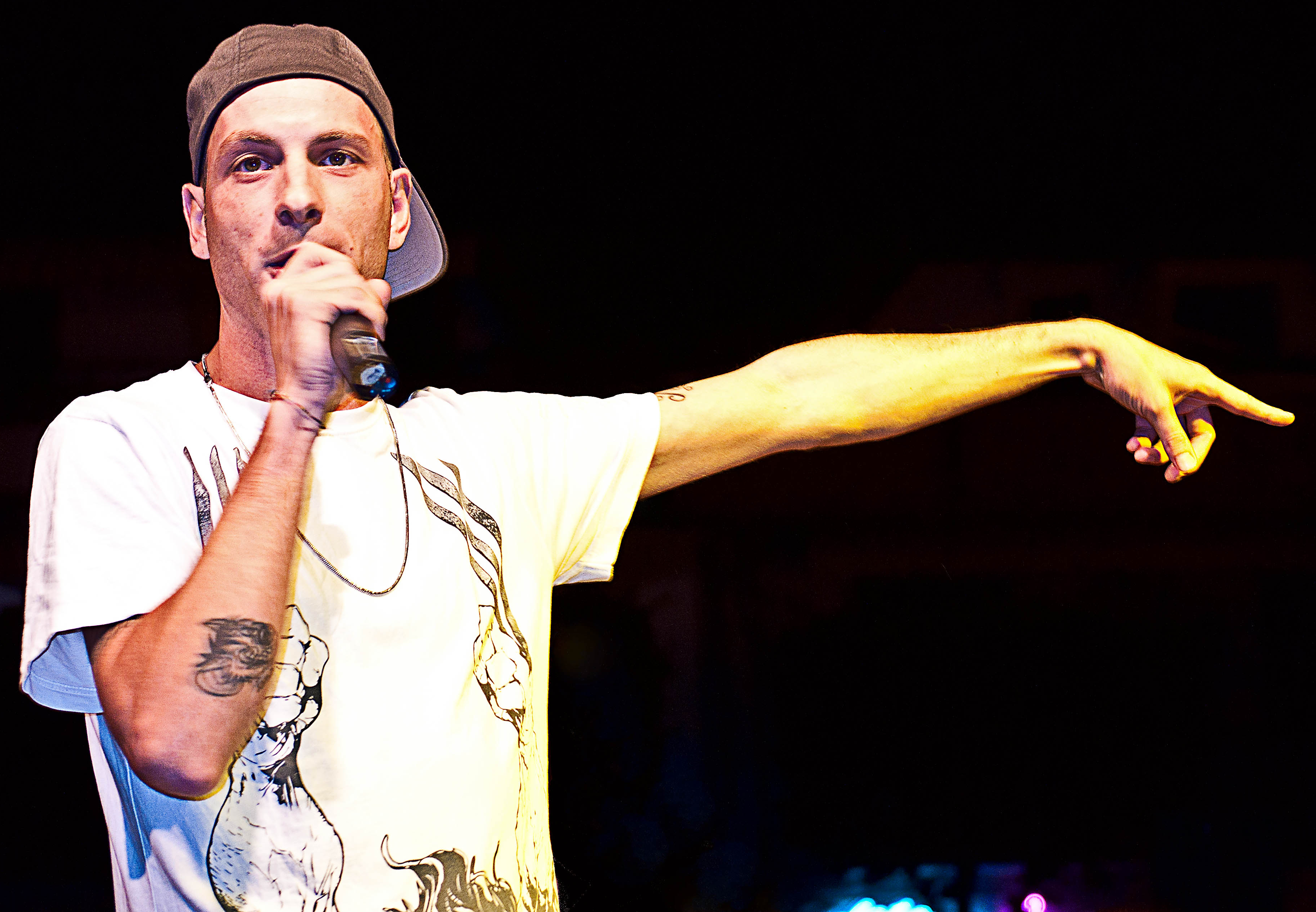
Clementino

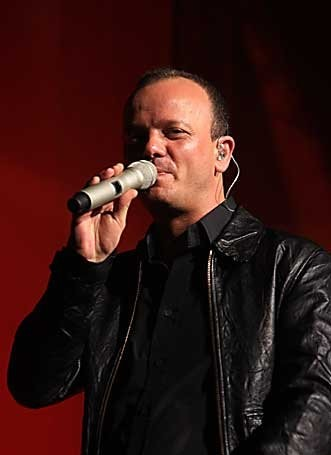
Gigi D'Alessio

Loredana Bertè

== Teams ==
- Winner
- Finalists
- Eliminated in the Final
- Eliminated in the Battles

Coaches	Top 28 artists			
Arisa	Emma Buscaglia	Alice Alfonso	Amelie Rizzi	Emilia Piemontesi
Arisa	Martina Cervellin	Elisa Puddu	Michele Bruzzese	
Clementino	Simone Grande	Rita Longordo	Alexander Racioppi	Emma and Giulia Parodi
Clementino	Teresa Ferraro	Federico Bergamo	Emmanuele Manna	
Gigi D'Alessio	Lucia Solazzo	Luigi Vitagliano	Angelica Stuppia	Giuseppe Di Menza
Gigi D'Alessio	Mirko Di Bartalomeo	Graziano Calculli	Sara Turrà	
Loredana Bertè	Desiree Malizia	Valentina Giamboi	Yari Verdesca	Giacomo Bastiani
Loredana Bertè	Nicole Curatolo	Gabriele Ansanelli	Giada Fois	
Note: Bold names are recipients of the 'Super Pass'.

== Blind auditions ==
Blind auditions premiered on November 24 and continued until December 8. Each coach had to have seven artists on their team at the end of the blind auditions, with each coach being given one "Super Block" to use in the entire blind auditions. Additionally, each coach had one "Super Pass". Using a super pass blocked all the other coaches from getting an artist. It also automatically put them in the final on the respective team.

Blind auditions color key
✔	Coach pressed "I WANT YOU" button
	Artist defaulted to a coach's team
	Artist elected this coach's team
	Artist eliminated as no coach pressing their button
	The artist received the "Super Pass" and advanced to the final
✘	Coach pressed "I WANT YOU" button, but was super blocked by Arisa
✘	Coach pressed "I WANT YOU" button, but was super blocked by Clementino
✘	Coach pressed "I WANT YOU" button, but was super blocked by Gigi
✘	Coach pressed "I WANT YOU" button, but was super blocked by Loredana

Blind auditions results
Episode	Order	Artist	Age	Hometown	Song	Coach's and contestant's choices			
Episode	Order	Artist	Age	Hometown	Song	Arisa	Clementino	Gigi	Loredana
Episode 1 (November 24)	1	Giuseppe Di Menza	10	Vittoria	"Il mondo"	✔	✔	✔	✔
Episode 1 (November 24)	2	Amelie Rizzi	11	Bardolino	"Old Time Rock and Roll"	✔	✔	✔	✘
Episode 1 (November 24)	3	Alexander Racioppi	14	Apice	"Tango"	✔	✔	✔	✔
Episode 1 (November 24)	4	Walter Zecca	8	Florence	"Sarà perché ti amo"	—	—	—	—
Episode 1 (November 24)	5	Lucia Solazzo	13	Dolo	"Hello"	✘	✘	✔	✘
Episode 1 (November 24)	6	Valentina Giamboi	10	Turin	"Sola"	✔	✘	✔	✔
Episode 1 (November 24)	7	Carlotta Agata	8	Biancavilla	"Farfalle"	—	—	—	—
Episode 1 (November 24)	8	Yari Verdesca	13	Salice Salentino	"Jailhouse Rock"	—	✔	✔	✔
Episode 1 (November 24)	9	Emilia Piemontesi	10	Romagnano Sesia	"La felicità"	✔	—	—	—
Episode 1 (November 24)	10	Teresa Ferraro	13	San Pietro in Guarano	"Empire State of Mind"	✔	✔	✔	✔
Episode 1 (November 24)	11	Angelo Salerno	12	Palma di Montechiaro	"Il rock di Capitan Uncino"	—	—	—	—
Episode 1 (November 24)	12	Emma and Giulia Parodi	12	Genoa	"Frankenstein"	—	✔	—	—
Episode 2 (December 1)	1	Emma Buscaglia	12	Vasto	"Vorrei che fosse amore"	✔	✔	✘	—
Episode 2 (December 1)	2	Graziano Calculli	11	Gravina in Puglia	"Cambiare"	✔	✔	✔	✔
Episode 2 (December 1)	3	Martina Cervellin	10	Milan	"Black Horse and the Cherry Tree"	✔	✔	✔	✔
Episode 2 (December 1)	4	Simone Grande	11	Rozzano	"L'essenziale"	✘	✔	—	—
Episode 2 (December 1)	5	Giuliana Gioia	11	Taormina	"Fiesta"	—	—	—	—
Episode 2 (December 1)	6	Rita Longordo	12	Bussana	"Always Remember Us This Way"	✘	✔	✘	✘
Episode 2 (December 1)	7	Federico Bergamo	10	Rome	"Bellissimissima"	—	✔	—	—
Episode 2 (December 1)	8	Giulia Mosca	11	Campi Bisenzio	"Bellissima"	—	—	—	—
Episode 2 (December 1)	9	Luigi Vitagliano	12	Rome	"Message in a Bottle"	—	✔	✔	✔
Episode 2 (December 1)	10	Anna Celebre	12	Cosenza	"Ci pensiamo domani"	—	—	—	—
Episode 2 (December 1)	11	Desiree Malizia	14	Montalto Uffugo	"Right to Be Wrong"	✘	✘	✘	✔
Episode 2 (December 1)	12	Giacomo Bastiani	12	Livorno	"Beat It"	—	✔	—	✔
Episode 2 (December 1)	13	Giorgia Bonsangue	14	Canicattì	"Cenere"	—	—	—	—
Episode 2 (December 1)	14	Elisa Puddu	13	Botticino	"Anche fragile"	✔	—	✔	—
Episode 3 (December 8)	1	Nicole Curatolo	9	Bologna	"La vita"	✔	✔	✔	✔
Episode 3 (December 8)	2	Mirko Di Bartalomeo	13	Poggiorsini	"Grande amore"	✔	✔	✔	—
Episode 3 (December 8)	3	Alice Alfonso	13	Lecce	"Se piovesse il tuo nome"	✔	✘	✘	✘
Episode 3 (December 8)	4	Cherie Scuncia	8	Reggio Calabria	"Italodisco"	—	—	—	—
Episode 3 (December 8)	5	Angelica Stuppia	13	Rome	"Duemilaminuti"	✔	✔	✔	✔
Episode 3 (December 8)	6	Alexia Satini	13	Rome	"Snow on the Sahara"	—	—	—	—
Episode 3 (December 8)	7	Michele Bruzzese	11	Melicucco	"Pensieri e parole"	✔	✔	—	✔
Episode 3 (December 8)	8	Emmanuele Manna	7	Saviano	"Nu juorno buono"	Team full	✔	—	—
Episode 3 (December 8)	9	Gabriele Ansanelli	12	Rome	"Rolling in the Deep"	Team full	Team full	—	✔
Episode 3 (December 8)	10	Mattia Mazzotta	13	Calimera	"È la mia vita"	Team full	Team full	—	—
Episode 3 (December 8)	11	Tommaso Quarta	13	Campi Salentina	"The Scientist"	Team full	Team full	—	—
Episode 3 (December 8)	12	Sara Turrà	13	Cutro	"Io e te da soli"	Team full	Team full	✔	✔
Episode 3 (December 8)	13	Valentina Roso	10	Pescantina	"Le tasche piene di sassi"	Team full	Team full	Team full	—
Episode 3 (December 8)	14	Giada Fois	13	Brandizzo	"Killing Me Softly with his Song"	Team full	Team full	Team full	✔

== Battles ==
The battles, also dubbed as the semi-final, saw the 24 remaining contestants compete, which determined the 12 young finalists of the program. The challenges took place between three competitors from the same team who each battle performing the track assigned to them by their coach, who at the end of the performances decided the finalist of the three, eliminating the other two. At the end of the challenges, two competitors per team made it to the final, joining the finalist decreed at the Blind Auditions, through the use of the Super Pass. The battles aired on December 15, 2023.

Artist won the battle and advanced to the final
Artist lost the battle and was eliminated

Episode	Coach	Order	Artist	Song	Result
Episode 4 (December 15)	Arisa	1	Martina Cervellin	"Cambia un uomo"	Eliminated
Episode 4 (December 15)	Arisa	2	Emma Biscaglia	"On My Own"	Advanced
Episode 4 (December 15)	Arisa	3	Emilia Piemontesi	"Canto (Anche se sono stonato)"	Eliminated
Episode 4 (December 15)	Clementino	4	Emmanuele Manna	"Supereroi"	Eliminated
Episode 4 (December 15)	Clementino	5	Simone Grande	"Adagio"	Advanced
Episode 4 (December 15)	Clementino	6	Teresa Ferraro	"Crazy in Love"	Eliminated
Episode 4 (December 15)	Loredana Bertè	7	Gabriele Anzanelli	"Mi sei scoppiato dentro il cuore"	Eliminated
Episode 4 (December 15)	Loredana Bertè	8	Nicole Curatolo	"Alghero"	Eliminated
Episode 4 (December 15)	Loredana Bertè	9	Yari Verdesca	"That's What Friends Are For"	Advanced
Episode 4 (December 15)	Gigi D'Alessio	10	Graziano Calculli	"Ancora"	Eliminated
Episode 4 (December 15)	Gigi D'Alessio	11	Sara Turrà	"Lei"	Eliminated
Episode 4 (December 15)	Gigi D'Alessio	12	Luigi Vitagliano	"Bohemian Rhapsody"	Advanced
Episode 4 (December 15)	Arisa	13	Michele Bruzzese	"La leva calcistica della classe '68"	Eliminated
Episode 4 (December 15)	Arisa	14	Amelie Rizzi	"Crocodile Rock"	Advanced
Episode 4 (December 15)	Arisa	15	Elisa Puddu	"Luce (Tramonti a nord est)"	Eliminated
Episode 4 (December 15)	Gigi D'Alessio	16	Mirko Bartolomeo	"Fai rumore"	Eliminated
Episode 4 (December 15)	Gigi D'Alessio	17	Angelica Stuppia	"Giudizi universali"	Advanced
Episode 4 (December 15)	Gigi D'Alessio	18	Giuseppe Di Menza	"Caruso"	Eliminated
Episode 4 (December 15)	Clementino	19	Alexander Racioppi	"Coraline"	Advanced
Episode 4 (December 15)	Clementino	20	Federico Bergamo	"Serenata rap"	Eliminated
Episode 4 (December 15)	Clementino	21	Emma and Giulia Parodi	"In alto mare"	Eliminated
Episode 4 (December 15)	Loredana Bertè	22	Giacomo Bastiani	"Heal the World"	Eliminated
Episode 4 (December 15)	Loredana Bertè	23	Giada Fois	"Quando una stella muore"	Eliminated
Episode 4 (December 15)	Loredana Bertè	24	Valentina Giamboi	"Hurt"	Advanced

== Final ==
The final, aired on December 22, consisted of two rounds. The final three artists on every team, or top twelve, battled to become the winner of the second season of The Voice Kids.

First round

Artist advanced to the Top 4
Artist was eliminated

Episode	Coach	Order	Artist	Song	Result
Episode 5 (December 22)	Loredana Bertè	1	Valentina Giamboi	"Dimmi come..."	Eliminated
Episode 5 (December 22)	Clementino	2	Simone Grande	"All By Myself"	Advanced
Episode 5 (December 22)	Gigi D'Alessio	3	Lucia Solazzo	"E poi"	Advanced
Episode 5 (December 22)	Arisa	4	Emma Buscaglia	"I Surrender"	Advanced
Episode 5 (December 22)	Clementino	5	Rita Longordo	"La solitudine"	Eliminated
Episode 5 (December 22)	Loredana Bertè	6	Yari Verdesca	"Billie Jean"	Eliminated
Episode 5 (December 22)	Arisa	7	Amelie Rizzi	"E la luna bussò"	Eliminated
Episode 5 (December 22)	Gigi D'Alessio	8	Angelica Stuppia	"Due vite"	Eliminated
Episode 5 (December 22)	Clementino	9	Alexander Racioppi	"Cenere"	Eliminated
Episode 5 (December 22)	Loredana Bertè	10	Desiree Malizia	"Think"	Advanced
Episode 5 (December 22)	Gigi D'Alessio	11	Luigi Vitagliano	"Mentre tutto scorre"	Eliminated
Episode 5 (December 22)	Arisa	12	Alice Alfonso	"Io vivrò (senza te)"	Eliminated

Second round

Winner
Finalists

Episode	Coach	Order	Artist	Song	Result
Episode 5 (December 22)	Gigi D'Alessio	1	Lucia Solazzo	"Hello"	Finalists
Episode 5 (December 22)	Arisa	2	Emma Buscaglia	"Vorrei che fosse amore"	Finalists
Episode 5 (December 22)	Loredana Bertè	3	Desiree Malizia	"Right to Be Wrong"	Finalists
Episode 5 (December 22)	Clementino	4	Simone Grande	"Adagio"	Winner
