= The Voice Kids (Italian TV series) =

- Genre: Reality television
- Created by: John de Mol
- Developed by: Talpa Content
- Presented by: Antonella Clerici
- Judges: Ricchi e Poveri; Clementino; Gigi D'Alessio; Loredana Bertè; Arisa; Rocco Hunt; Nek
- Country of origin: Italy
- Original language: Italian
- No. of seasons: 4
- No. of episodes: 13

Production
- Producers: Fremantle; ITV Studios

Original release
- Network: Rai 1 HD; Rai Premium (reruns)
- Release: March 4, 2023 – present

Related
- The Voice of Italy; The Voice Senior; The Voice Generations; The Voice (franchise)

The Voice Kids is an Italian TV series. It is a spin-off of The Voice of Italy, but instead of having contestants aged 16 or older, the spin-off exclusively features children aged 7 to 14. The coaches for the first season were the same as those from the third season of The Voice Senior, being Gigi D'Alessio, Loredana Bertè, Clementino and Ricchi e Poveri. Antonella Clerici presented the show. On July 26, 2023, it was reported that singer, Arisa, would join the show for its second season, replacing Ricchi e Poveri. The show's second season premiered on November 24, 2023.

== Coaches and host ==
=== Coaches timeline ===
The coaches for the first season of The Voice Kids were announced to be Ricchi e Poveri, Clementino, Gigi D'Alessio, and Loredana Bertè. Prior to the premiere of the second season, it was announced that Clementino, D'Alessio, and Bertè would all return for the second season alongside new coach, Arisa. Shortly before the premiere of the third season, it was announced that all coaches from the second season would return for the third season. Prior to the fourth season airing, it was confirmed that the panel from the season 6 of The Voice Senior would be the panel for this season. Arisa and Bertè returned alongside Clementino who, this season, is a duo coach with Rocco Hunt. Meanwhile, Nek replaced D'Alessio.

Seasons
Coach	1	2	3	4
Clementino				
Gigi D'Alessio				
Loredana Bertè				
Ricchi e Poveri				
Arisa				
Rocco Hunt				
Nek				

Coaches gallery

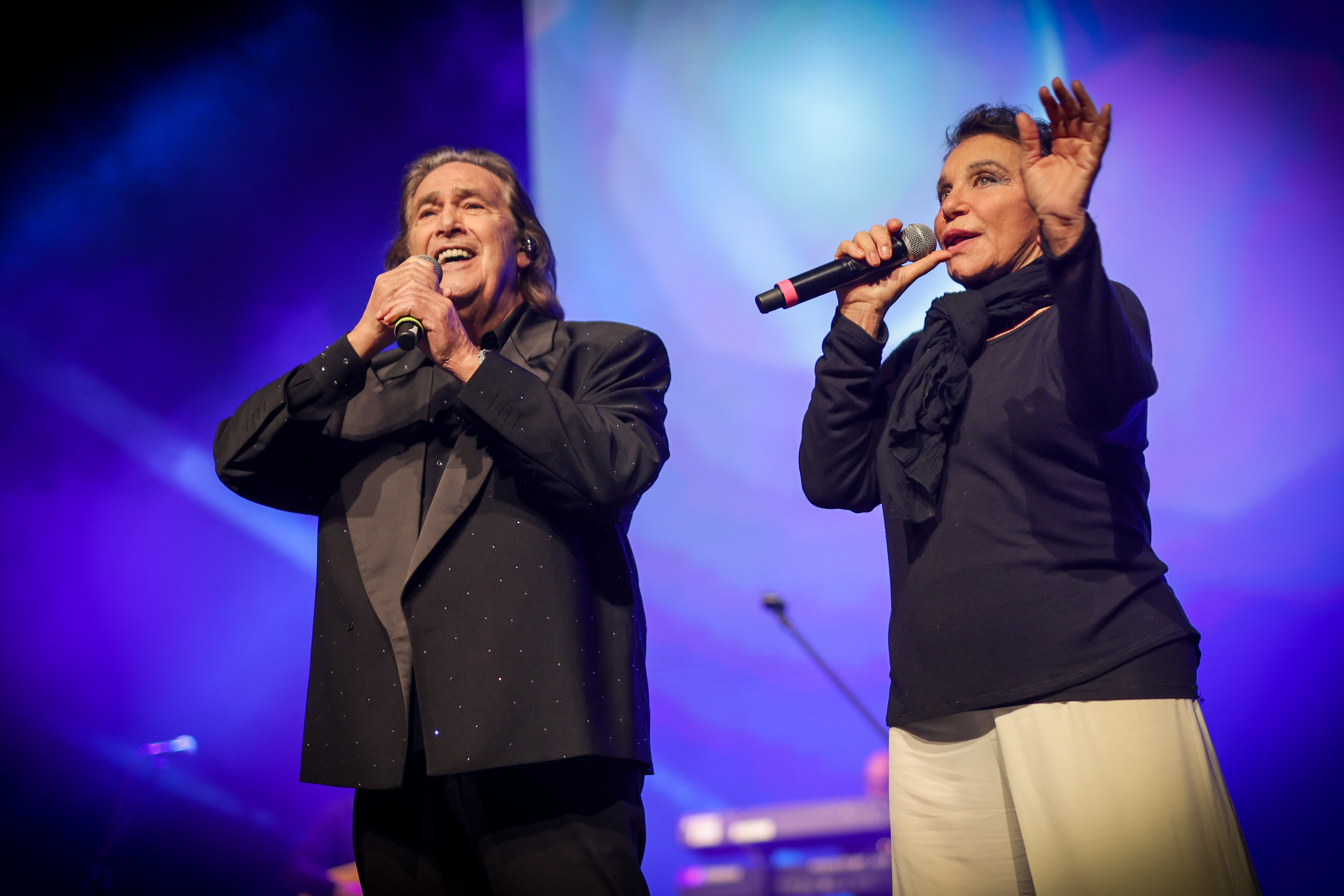
Ricchi e Poveri (duo: 1)

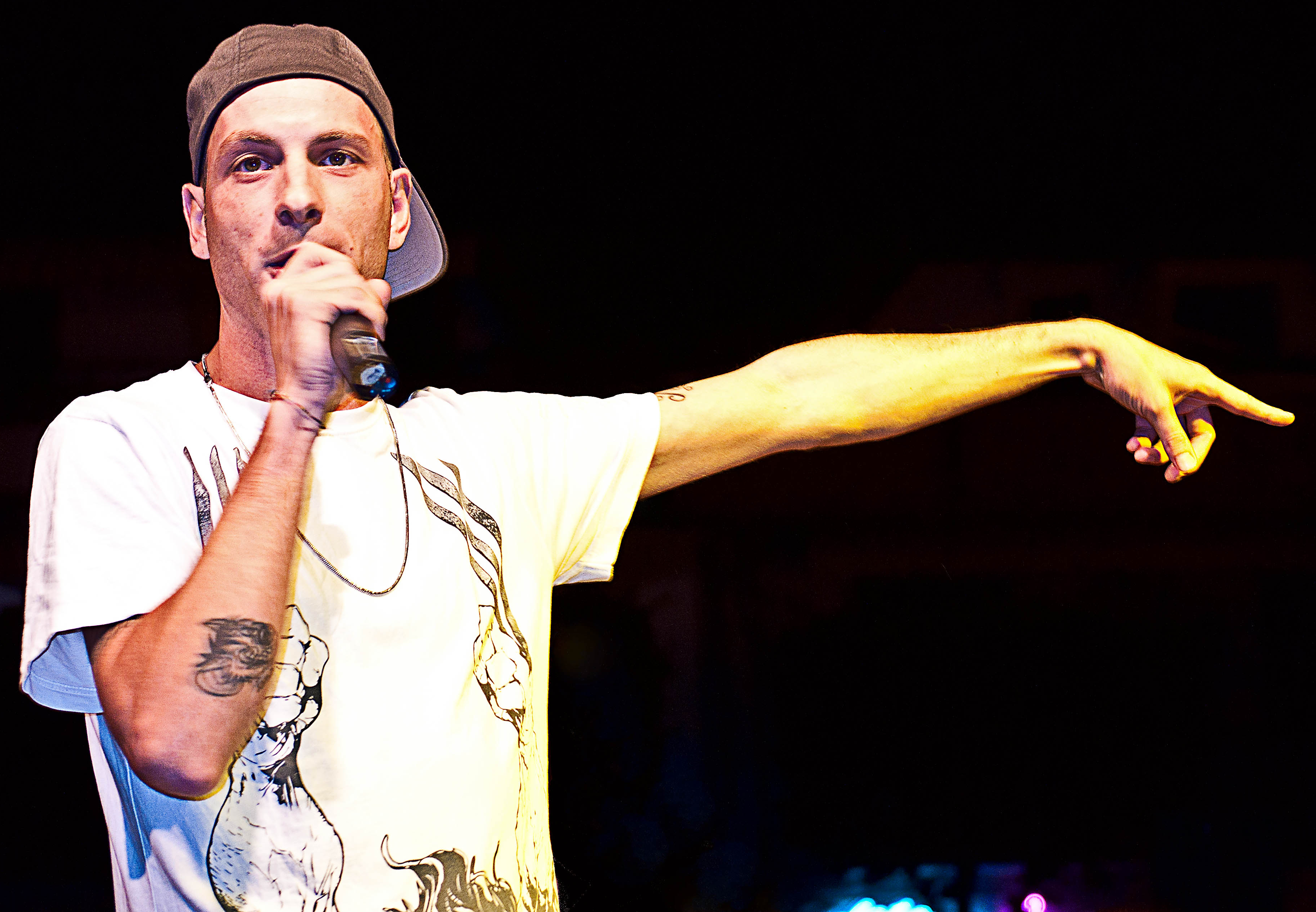
Clementino (solo: 1–3, duo: 4–present)

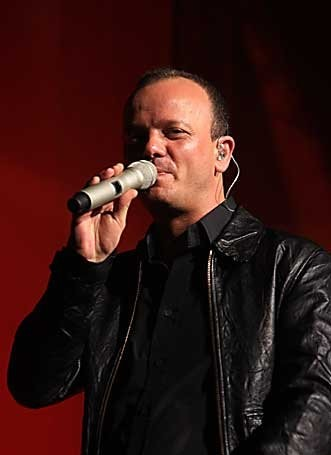
Gigi D'Alessio (1−3)

Loredana Bertè (1−present)

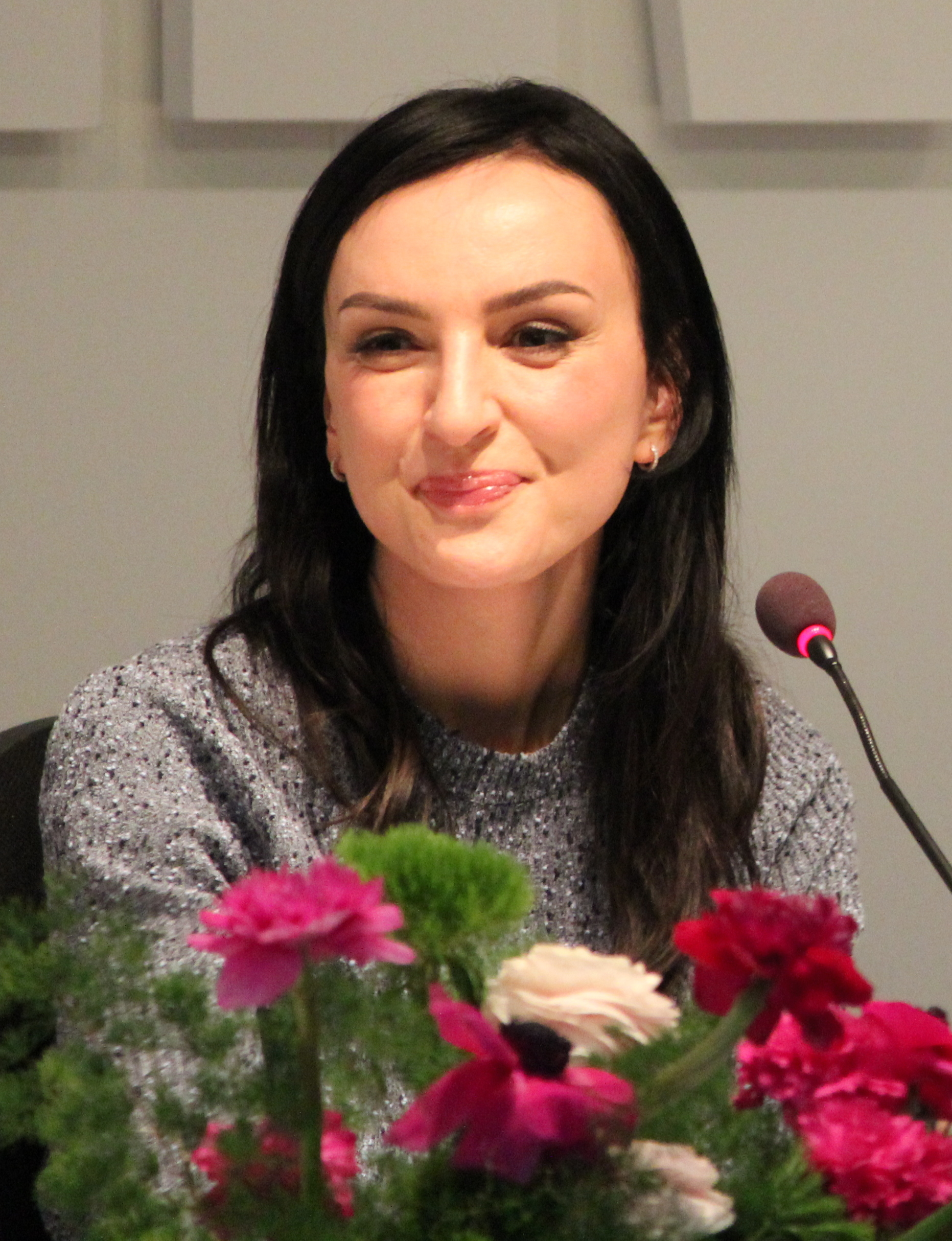
Arisa (2−present)

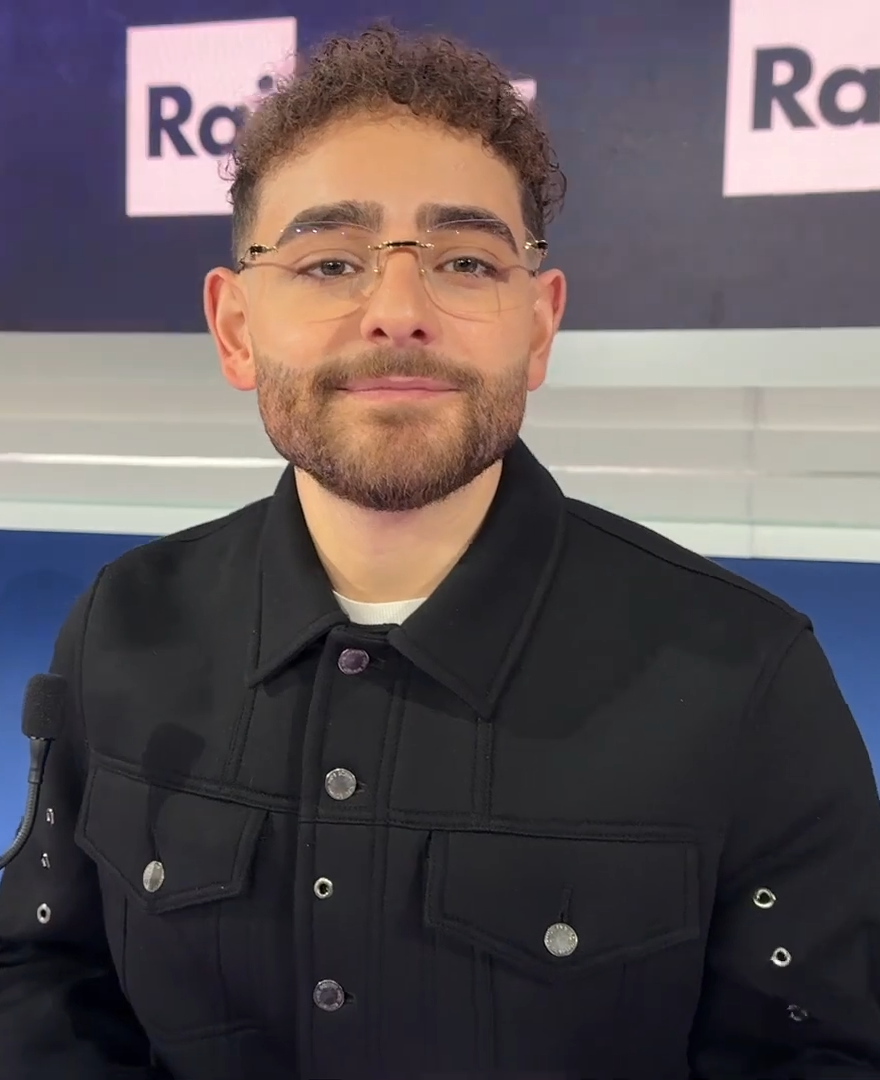
Rocco Hunt (duo: 4–present)

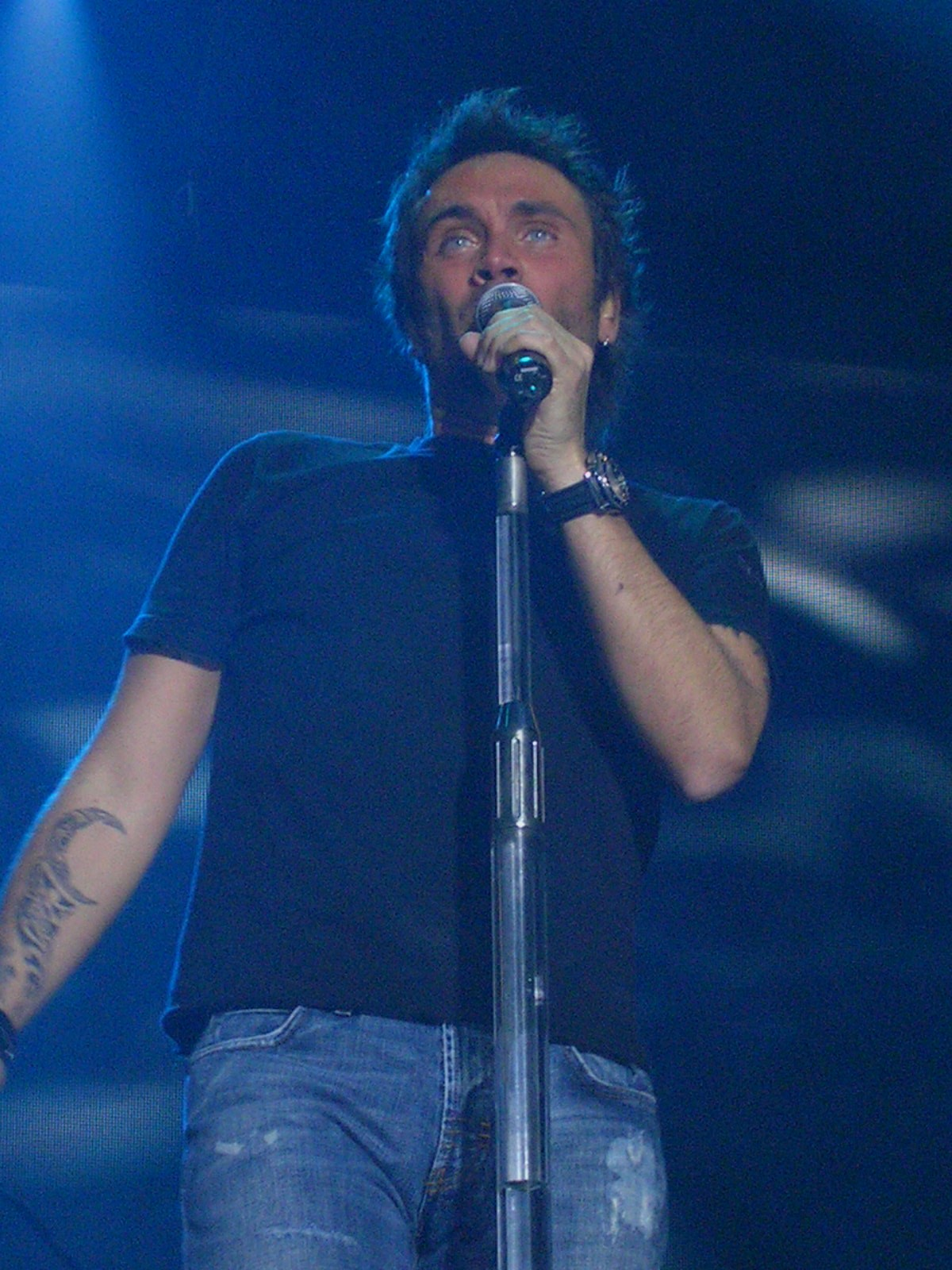
Nek (4−present)

=== Host ===
It was announced that host of The Voice Senior, Antonella Clerici, would host The Voice Kids. Clerici returned for the second, third, fourth and fifth season.

Presenter	Season			
Presenter	1	2	3	4
Antonella Clerici				

Host gallery

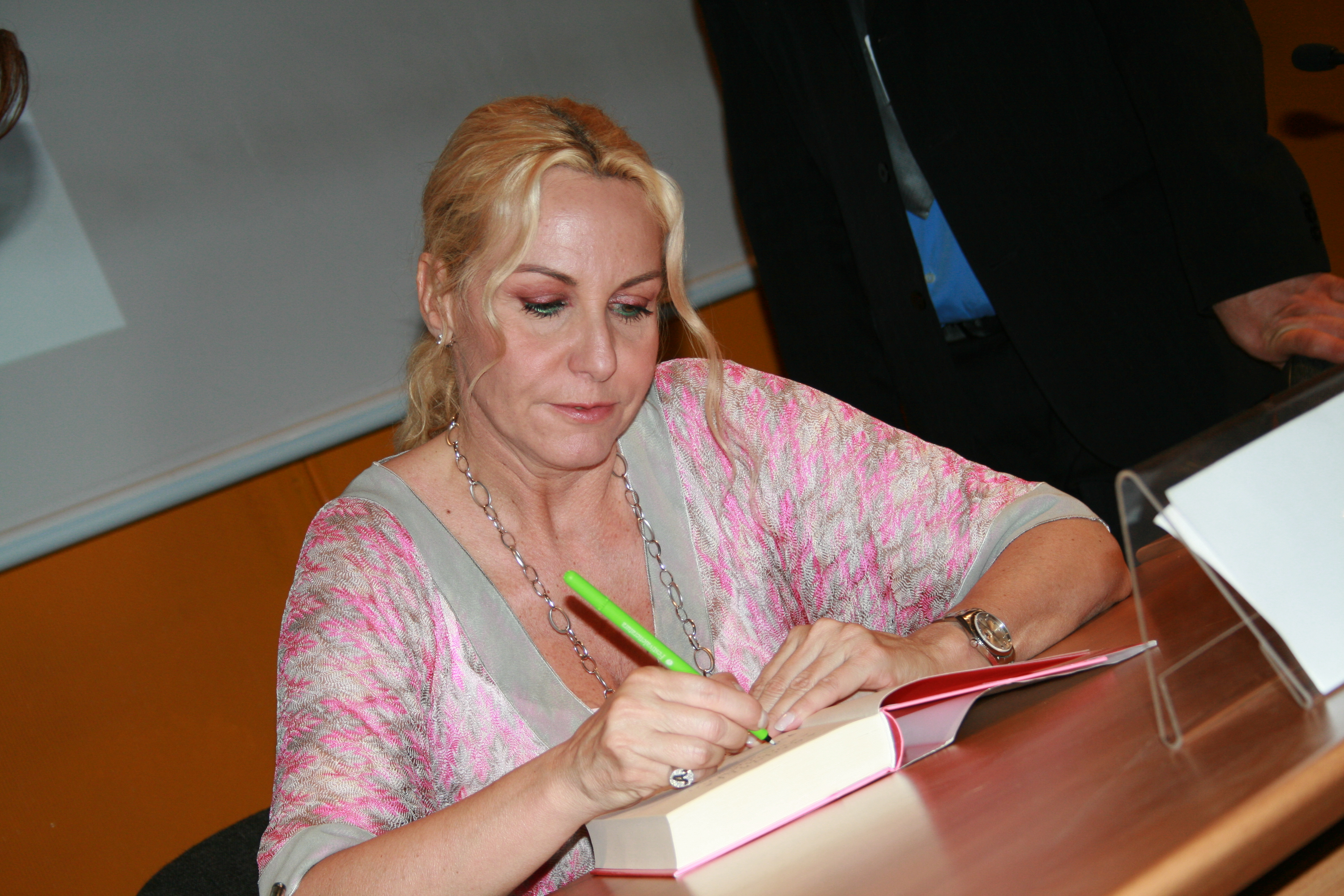
Antonella Clerici

== Series overview ==
The Voice Kids series overview
Season	Aired	Winner	Other finalists			Winning coach	Presenter	Coaches (chairs' order)			
Season	Aired	Winner	Other finalists			Winning coach	Presenter	1	2	3	4
1	2023	Melissa Agliottone	Ginevra Dabalà	Ranya Moufidi	Ilary Alaimo	Loredana Bertè	Antonella Clerici	Ricchi e Poveri	Clementino	Gigi	Loredana
2	2023	Simone Grande	Desiree Malizia	Lucia Solazzo	Emma Buscaglia	Clementino	Antonella Clerici	Arisa	Clementino	Gigi	Loredana
3	2024	Melissa Memeti	Niccolò Franceschini	Riccardo Collegari	Maria Sofia Corona	Loredana Bertè	Antonella Clerici	Arisa	Clementino	Gigi	Loredana
4	2026	Matteo Trullu	Briana Samira Camara	Andrea Ronga	Francesca Lanza	Nek	Antonella Clerici	Cleme & Rocco	Arisa	Nek	Loredana

=== Coaches and finalists ===
Color key
Winner in bold, finalists in italic.
Winner
Finalists

Season	Coaches and their finalists			
1	Ricchi e Poveri	Clementino	Gigi D'Alessio	Loredana Bertè
1	Ginevra Dabalà; Vincenzo Alighieri; Lorena Fernandez	Ranya Moufidi; Zinnedine Fatnassi; Rosario Caci	Ilary Alaimo; Andrea Galiano; Marta Maria La Rosa	**Melissa Agliottone**; Mia Arnone; Fedora Copparosa
2	Arisa	Clementino	Gigi D'Alessio	Loredana Bertè
2	Emma Buscaglia; Alice Alfonso; Amelie Rizzi	**Simone Grande**; Rita Longordo; Alexander Racioppi	Lucia Solazzo; Luigi Vitagliano; Angelica Stuppia	Desiree Malizia; Yari Verdesca; Valentina Giamboi
3	Niccolò Franceschini; Alessio Distefano; Annamaria Mihalache	Riccardo Collegari; Benedetta Muneglia; Leonardo Giovannangeli	Maria Sofia Corona; Francesco Paolo Scelzo; Sofia Monegato	**Melissa Memeti**; Gabriel Jimenez Martinez; Carol Cadeo
4	Clementino & Rocco Hunt	Arisa	Nek	Loredana Bertè
4	Andrea Ronga; Annagiulia Fusco; Francesco Ambrosi; Raffaello Digilio	Francesca Lanza; Ginevra Sergia; Fabiana Andreone; Maria Rosaria Rondina	**Matteo Trullu**; Miriam Bruno; Giovanni Frassi; Leonardo Zambelli	Briana Samira Camara; Emma Baggetta; Maya Verga; Riccardo Pezzicoli
