= The Voice Kids (Italian TV series) season 3 =

The Voice Kids
- Season 3
- Promotional poster featuring coaches and host (clockwise from left) Berté, D'Alessio, Clementino, Arisa, and Clerici
- Presented by: Antonella Clerici
- Coaches: Arisa; Clementino; Gigi D'Alessio; Loredana Bertè
- Winner: Melissa Memeti
- Winning coach: Loredana Bertè
- Runners-up: Maria Sofia Corona; Niccolò Franceschini; Riccardo Callegari

Release
- Original network: Rai 1
- Original release: 15 November – 20 December 2024

Season chronology
- ← Previous; Season 2 Next → Season 4

The third season of the Italian singing competition The Voice Kids began airing on 15 November 2024, on Rai 1. Shortly prior to the season airing, the panel was confirmed to be the same as the previous season, with Arisa, Clementino, Gigi D'Alessio, and Loredana Bertè all returned as returned as coaches. Additionally, Antonella Clerici returned for her third consecutive season as host.

Thirteen-year-old Melissa Memeti won the season on 20 December, marking Bertè's second win as a coach on The Voice Kids (his third overall after her win on the first season of The Voice Senior). Ten-year-old finalist Leonardo Giovannangeli was later selected to represent Italy in the Junior Eurovision Song Contest 2025.

== Coaches ==
The coaches of the third season of The Voice Kids were Clementino, Gigi D'Alessio and Loredana Bertè, who returned for their third seasons. Alongside them Arisa returned for her second season.

The Voice Kids season 3 coaches

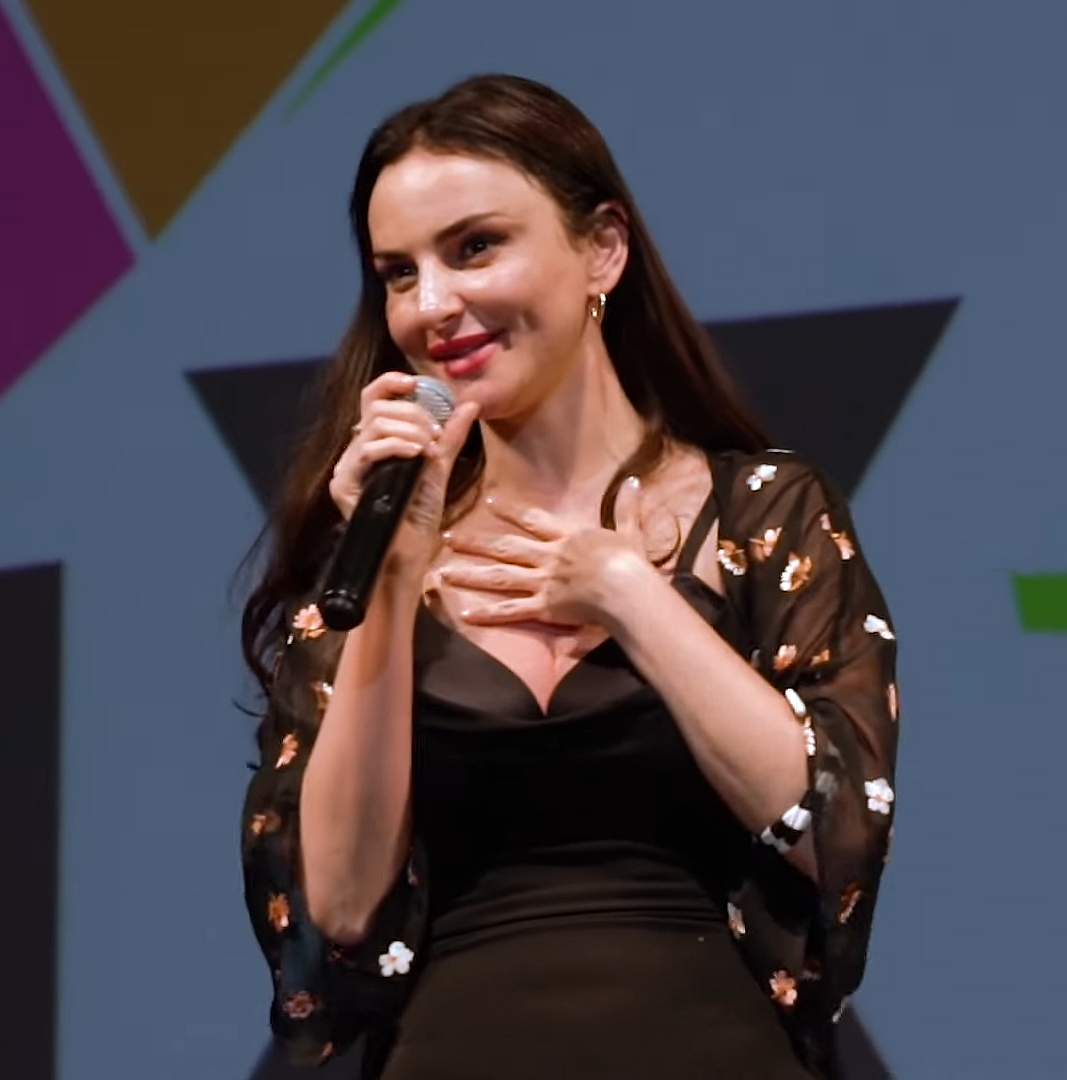
Arisa

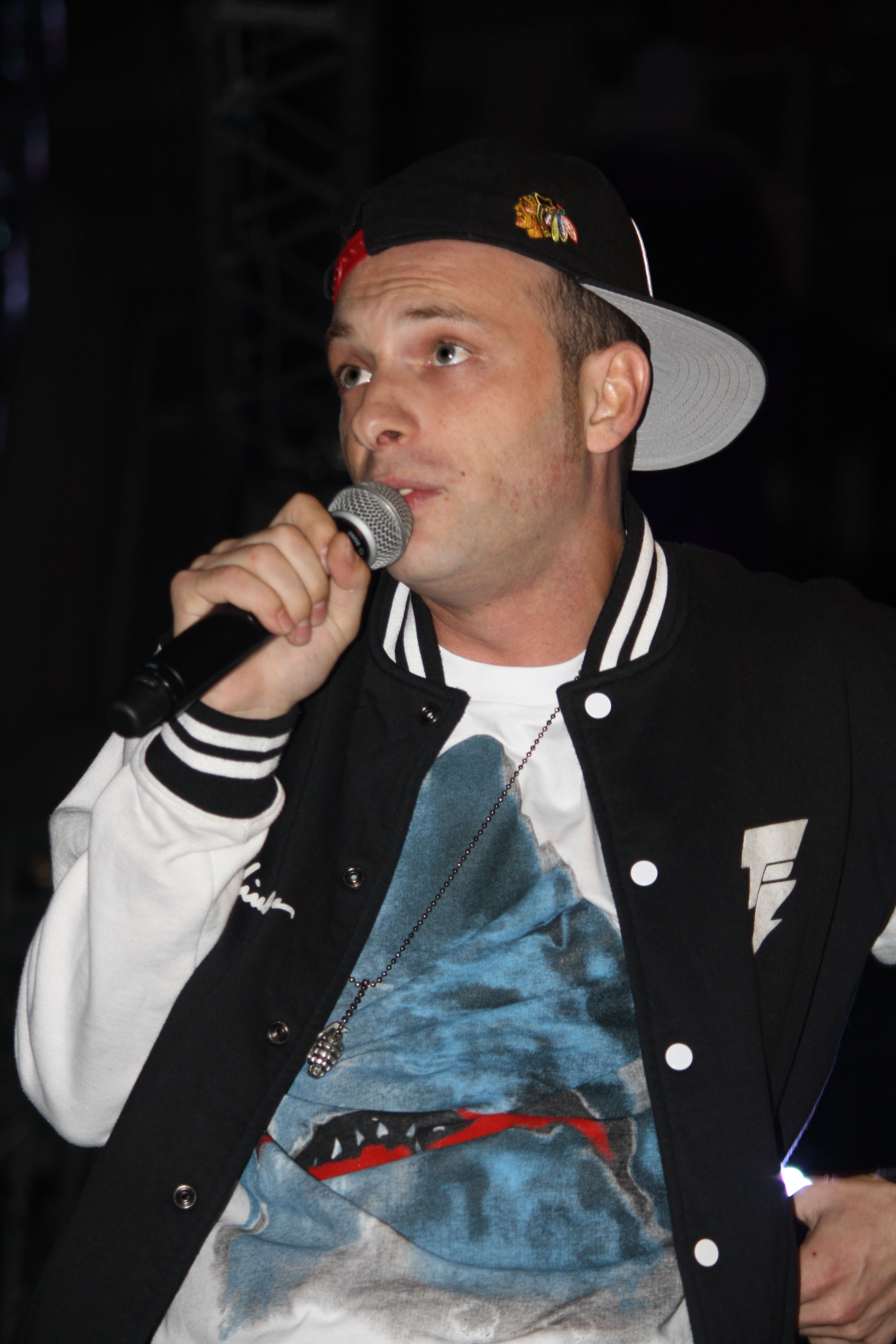
Clementino

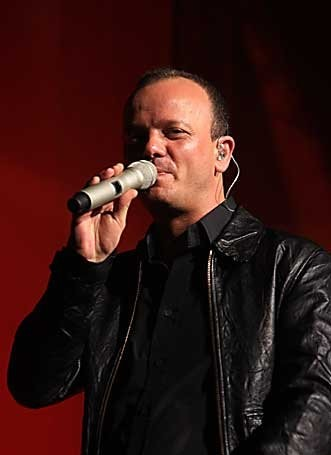
Gigi D'Alessio

Loredana Bertè

== Teams ==
- Winner
- Finalists
- Eliminated in the Final
- Eliminated in the Battles

Coaches	Top 36 artists				
Arisa	Niccolò Franceschini	Alessio Distefano	Annamaria Mihalache	Aurora Di Profio	Aurora Galante
Arisa	Emma Milani	Flaminia Occhipinti	Giorgia Allegrini	Giulia Fina	
Clementino	Riccardo Callegari	Benedetta Muneglia	Leonardo Giovannangeli	Alessandra Colacarlo	Alessandro Pompeo
Clementino	Cecilia Cataldo	Federica Lo Porto	Isabel Durastante	Silvano Fava	
Gigi D'Alessio	Maria Sofia Corona	Francesco Maugeri	Sofia Monegato	Dennis Bennicasa	Elisa Casella
Gigi D'Alessio	Francesco Paolo Scelzo	Linda Roreti	Nausica Speranzini	Tommaso Aiello	
Loredana Bertè	Melissa Memeti	Carol Cadeo	Gabriel Jimenez Martinez	Asia Bavaro	Benedetta Morzetta
Loredana Bertè	Marco Della Mura	Martina Panarello	Sara Ghinassi	Viola Vivo	
Note: Bold names are recipients of the 'Super Pass'.

== Blind auditions ==
The blind auditions premiered on 15 November 2024. Each coach must have nine artists on their team at the end of the blind auditions. Each coach is given one "block" to use in the entirety of the blind auditions. Additionally, each coach has one "super pass" to award to an artist which defaults the artist to their team and automatically advances them to the final.

Blind auditions color key
✔	Coach pressed "I WANT YOU" button
	Artist defaulted to a coach's team
	Artist elected this coach's team
	Artist eliminated as no coach pressing their button
	The artist received the "Super Pass" and advanced to the final
✘	Coach pressed "I WANT YOU" button, but was super blocked by Arisa
✘	Coach pressed "I WANT YOU" button, but was super blocked by Clementino
✘	Coach pressed "I WANT YOU" button, but was super blocked by Gigi
✘	Coach pressed "I WANT YOU" button, but was super blocked by Loredana

Blind auditions results
Episode	Order	Artist	Age	Hometown	Song	Coach's and contestant's choices			
Episode	Order	Artist	Age	Hometown	Song	Arisa	Clementino	Gigi	Loredana
Episode 1 (15 November)	1	Emma Milani	13	Galbiate	"In cerca di te"	✔	✔	✔	✔
Episode 1 (15 November)	2	Annamaria Mihalache	11	Vetralla	"Esseri umani"	✔	✔	✘	✔
Episode 1 (15 November)	3	Alessandro Pompeo	10	Montescaglioso	"Rock 'n' Roll Robot"	✔	✔	—	—
Episode 1 (15 November)	4	Melissa Memeti	13	Casoli	"Listen"	✘	✔	✔	✔
Episode 1 (15 November)	5	Giulia Fina	10	San Donaci	"Viva la pappa col pomodoro"	✔	✔	✔	✔
Episode 1 (15 November)	6	Alessio Distefano	12	Sesto San Giovanni	"Sweet Child o' Mine"	✔	✘	✘	✘
Episode 1 (15 November)	7	Livia Fanara	8	Canicattì	"Rumore"	—	—	—	—
Episode 1 (15 November)	8	Francesco Maugeri	12	Niscemi	"Voilà"	✔	✔	✔	✔
Episode 1 (15 November)	9	Asia Bavaro	12	Bari	"Sogna, ragazzo, sogna"	✔	✔	✔	✔
Episode 1 (15 November)	10	Antonino Pizzardi	10	Niscemi	"Casa mia"	—	—	—	—
Episode 1 (15 November)	11	Cecilia Cataldo	14	Matera	"Don't Stop Me Now"	—	✔	✔	✔
Episode 2 (22 November)	1	Maria Sofia Corona	13	San Sperate	"Your Love"	✘	✘	✔	✘
Episode 2 (22 November)	2	Silvano Fava	10	Bologna	"Romagna mia"	—	✔	—	—
Episode 2 (22 November)	3	Aurora Di Profio	11	Montesilvano	"Ovunque sarai"	✔	✔	✔	✔
Episode 2 (22 November)	4	Francesca Quero	10	Massafra	"La sirenetta"	—	—	—	—
Episode 2 (22 November)	5	Marco Della Mura	14	Corigliano-Rossano	"Granada"	✔	✔	✘	✔
Episode 2 (22 November)	6	Sofia Monegato	13	Asolo	"Something's Got a Hold on Me"	✔	✔	✔	✔
Episode 2 (22 November)	7	Tommaso Aiello	14	Decimomannu	"Tutto quello che un uomo"	✔	✔	✔	✔
Episode 2 (22 November)	8	Federico Thinh Fantini	14	Milan	"Shake It Off"	—	—	—	—
Episode 2 (22 November)	9	Benedetta Morzetta	10	Empoli	"La noia"	—	—	—	✔
Episode 2 (22 November)	10	Sara Ghinassi	13	Faenza	"What Was I Made For?"	—	—	✔	✔
Episode 2 (22 November)	11	Luca Oliveira	12	Naples	"M' manc"	—	—	—	—
Episode 2 (22 November)	12	Alessandra Colacarlo	14	Casoli	"Che sia benedetta"	—	✔	—	—
Episode 3 (29 November)	1	Dennis Benincasa	13	Pontedera	"Se io, se lei"	—	✘	✔	✔
Episode 3 (29 November)	2	Isabel Durastante	8	L'Aquila	"Dance Monkey"	—	✔	✔	—
Episode 3 (29 November)	3	Giorgia Allegrini	14	Bari	"Oro"	✔	✔	✔	✔
Episode 3 (29 November)	4	Giovanni Iannone	11	Naples	"Un amore così grande"	—	—	—	—
Episode 3 (29 November)	5	Linda Loreti	12	Assisi	"Sei nell'anima"	—	✔	✔	—
Episode 3 (29 November)	6	Gabriel Jimenez Martinez	12	Genoa	"Let It Be"	✘	✘	—	✔
Episode 3 (29 November)	7	Flaminia Occhipinti	10	Vittoria	"Avrai"	✔	—	—	—
Episode 3 (29 November)	8	Francesco Paolo Scelzo	13	Salsomaggiore Terme	"Abbracciame"	—	✔	✔	—
Episode 3 (29 November)	9	Vittoria Cuciniello	12	Scafati	"Ma non tutta la vita"	—	—	—	—
Episode 3 (29 November)	10	Riccardo Callegari	12	Medicina	"Lose Yourself"	—	✔	✘	✘
Episode 3 (29 November)	11	Martina Panarello	13	Rome	"La compagnia"	—	—	✔	✔
Episode 3 (29 November)	12	Nicolò Martini	11	Canelli	"Ma che idea"	—	—	—	—
Episode 3 (29 November)	13	Federica Lo Porto	12	Palermo	"Tutta colpa mia"	—	✔	—	—
Episode 4 (6 December)	1	Niccolò Franceschini	14	Rieti	"Passerà"	✔	✔	✔	✔
Episode 4 (6 December)	2	Nausica Speranzini	11	Molfetta	"Un amore da favola"	✔	—	✔	—
Episode 4 (6 December)	3	Dario Mattia	11	Bitonto	"Dove si balla"	—	—	—	—
Episode 4 (6 December)	4	Benedetta Muneglia	13	Vittoria	"Don Raffaè"	—	✔	✔	✔
Episode 4 (6 December)	5	Giorgia Cangemi	10	Partinico	"Come un ragazzo"	—	—	—	—
Episode 4 (6 December)	6	Viola Vivo	9	Taggia	"Distratto"	✔	—	—	✔
Episode 4 (6 December)	7	Leonardo Giovannangeli	10	Rome	"The Way You Make Me Feel"	✔	✔	✔	✔
Episode 4 (6 December)	8	Aurora Galante	12	Montesilvano	"Straordinario"	✔	Team full	✔	✔
Episode 4 (6 December)	9	Azzurra Chiara Galasso	11	Francavilla al Mare	"Portami a ballare"	Team full	Team full	—	—
Episode 4 (6 December)	10	Elisa Casella	13	Velletri	"Set Fire to the Rain"	Team full	Team full	✔	✔
Episode 4 (6 December)	11	Vittoria Ganzerli	13	Curtatone	"Perdere l'amore"	Team full	Team full	Team full	—
Episode 4 (6 December)	12	Carol Cadeo	10	Rome	"Nessun dolore"	Team full	Team full	Team full	✔

== Battles ==
The battles, also dubbed as the semi-final, saw the 32 remaining contestants compete, which determined the 12 young finalists of the program. The challenges took place between three competitors from the same team who each battle performing the track assigned to them by their coach, who at the end of the performances decided the finalist of the three, eliminating the other two. At the end of the challenges, two competitors per team made it to the final, joining the finalist decreed at the Blind Auditions, through the use of the Super Pass. The battles aired on February 7, 2026.

Artist won the battle and advanced to the final
Artist lost the battle and was eliminated

Episode	Coach	Order	Artist	Song	Result
Episode 5 (13 December)	Loredana Bertè	1	Sara Ghinassi	"Il mio canto libero"	Eliminated
Episode 5 (13 December)	Loredana Bertè	2	Carol Cadeo	"Sweet Dreams (Are Made of This)"	Advanced
Episode 5 (13 December)	Loredana Bertè	3	Viola Vivo	"Se piovesse il tuo nome"	Eliminated
Episode 5 (13 December)	Loredana Bertè	4	Asia Bavaro	"Beggin'"	Eliminated
Episode 5 (13 December)	Gigi D'Alessio	5	Linda Loreti	"Grande, grande, grande"	Eliminated
Episode 5 (13 December)	Gigi D'Alessio	6	Francesco Maugeri	"La rondine"	Advanced
Episode 5 (13 December)	Gigi D'Alessio	7	Dennis Benincasa	"Ci vorrebbe il mare"	Eliminated
Episode 5 (13 December)	Gigi D'Alessio	8	Elisa Casella	"Meraviglioso amore mio"	Eliminated
Episode 5 (13 December)	Arisa	9	Flaminia Occhipinti	"Giudizi universali"	Eliminated
Episode 5 (13 December)	Arisa	10	Aurora Di Profio	"Try"	Eliminated
Episode 5 (13 December)	Arisa	11	Aurora Galante	"Guarda che luna"	Eliminated
Episode 5 (13 December)	Arisa	12	Annamaria Mihalache	"Beautiful"	Advanced
Episode 5 (13 December)	Clementino	13	Federica Lo Porto	"Amare"	Eliminated
Episode 5 (13 December)	Clementino	14	Silvano Fava	"Rosamunda"	Eliminated
Episode 5 (13 December)	Clementino	15	Leonardo Giovannangeli	"Believer"	Advanced
Episode 5 (13 December)	Clementino	16	Alessandra Colacarlo	"Anna e Marco"	Eliminated
Episode 5 (13 December)	Loredana Bertè	17	Marco Della Mura	"Con te partirò"	Eliminated
Episode 5 (13 December)	Loredana Bertè	18	Benedetta Morzetta	"Sinceramente"	Eliminated
Episode 5 (13 December)	Loredana Bertè	19	Melissa Memeti	"Greatest Love of All"	Advanced
Episode 5 (13 December)	Loredana Bertè	20	Martina Panarello	"Mentre tutto scorre"	Eliminated
Episode 5 (13 December)	Gigi D'Alessio	21	Francesco Paolo Scelzo	"Rossetto e caffè"	Eliminated
Episode 5 (13 December)	Gigi D'Alessio	22	Nausica Speranzini	"Don't You Worry 'bout a Thing"	Eliminated
Episode 5 (13 December)	Gigi D'Alessio	23	Tommaso Aiello	"Follia d'amore"	Eliminated
Episode 5 (13 December)	Gigi D'Alessio	24	Sofia Monegato	"E non finisce mica il cielo"	Advanced
Episode 5 (13 December)	Arisa	25	Giulia Fina	"Ma che freddo fa"	Eliminated
Episode 5 (13 December)	Arisa	26	Emma Milani	"Mercy"	Eliminated
Episode 5 (13 December)	Arisa	27	Giorgia Allegrini	"Come foglie"	Eliminated
Episode 5 (13 December)	Arisa	28	Niccolò Franceschini	"Poetica"	Advanced
Episode 5 (13 December)	Clementino	29	Alessandro Pompeo	"Il gatto e la volpe"	Eliminated
Episode 5 (13 December)	Clementino	30	Isabel Durastante	"Flowers"	Eliminated
Episode 5 (13 December)	Clementino	31	Benedetta Muneglia	"Le cose in comune"	Advanced
Episode 5 (13 December)	Clementino	32	Cecilia Cataldo	"Hopelessly Devoted to You"	Eliminated

== Final ==
The final, aired on December 20, 2024, consisted of two rounds. In the first phase of the final, the twelve talents who reached the final must perform a cover assigned by their coach. At the end of the first phase, only four, one from each team, will advance on the second phase of the final. At the end of the second and final phase, the winner of the third season of The Voice Kids was announced.

First round

Artist advanced to the Top 4
Artist was eliminated

Episode	Coach	Order	Artist	Song	Result
Episode 6 (20 December)	Arisa	1	Annamaria Mihalache	"Quando nasce un amore"	Eliminated
Episode 6 (20 December)	Gigi D'Alessio	2	Maria Sofia Corona	"My Heart Will Go On"	Advanced
Episode 6 (20 December)	Loredana Bertè	3	Carol Cadeo	"Briciole"	Eliminated
Episode 6 (20 December)	Clementino	4	Leonardo Giovannangeli	"Beautiful Things"	Eliminated
Episode 6 (20 December)	Gigi D'Alessio	5	Francesco Maugeri	"La donna cannone"	Eliminated
Episode 6 (20 December)	Arisa	6	Alessio Distefano	"The Final Countdown"	Eliminated
Episode 6 (20 December)	Clementino	7	Riccardo Callegari	"Penso positivo"	Advanced
Episode 6 (20 December)	Loredana Bertè	8	Melissa Memeti	"I Have Nothing"	Advanced
Episode 6 (20 December)	Gigi D'Alessio	9	Sofia Monegato	"Di sole e d'azzurro"	Eliminated
Episode 6 (20 December)	Loredana Bertè	10	Gabriele Jimenez Martinez	"Your Song"	Eliminated
Episode 6 (20 December)	Clementino	11	Benedetta Muneglia	"Perdono"	Eliminated
Episode 6 (20 December)	Arisa	12	Niccolò Franceschini	"Sabato pomeriggio"	Advanced

Second round

Winner
Finalists

Episode	Coach	Order	Artist	Song	Result
Episode 6 (20 December)	Gigi D'Alessio	1	Maria Sofia Corona	"Your Love"	Finalists
Episode 6 (20 December)	Arisa	2	Niccolò Franceschini	"Passerà"	Finalists
Episode 6 (20 December)	Clementino	3	Riccardo Callegari	"Lose Yourself"	Finalists
Episode 6 (20 December)	Loredana Bertè	4	Melissa Memeti	"Listen"	Winner
