= The Voice Kids (Italian TV series) season 1 =

The Voice Kids
- Season 1
- Presented by: Antonella Clerici
- Coaches: Ricchi e Poveri; Clementino; Gigi D'Alessio; Loredana Bertè
- Winner: Melissa Agliottone
- Winning coach: Loredana Bertè
- Runners-up: Ginevra Dabalà; Ranya Moufidi; Ilary Alaimo

Release
- Original network: Rai 1
- Original release: March 4 – March 11, 2023

Season chronology
- Next → Season 2

The first season of The Voice Kids premiered on Rai 1 on March 4, 2023, with the coaches from the third season of The Voice Senior, Ricchi e Poveri, Clementino, Gigi D'Alessio, and Loredana Bertè. The finale aired on March 11, 2023 with twelve-year old Melissa Agliottone as the winner. The show was hosted by Antonella Clerici.

Agliottone, alongside fellow finalist Ranya Moufidi, were later selected to represent Italy in the Junior Eurovision Song contest 2023.

== Coaches ==
The coaches of the first season of The Voice Kids are Ricchi e Poveri, Clementino, Gigi D'Alessio, and Loredana Bertè.

The Voice Kids season 1 coaches

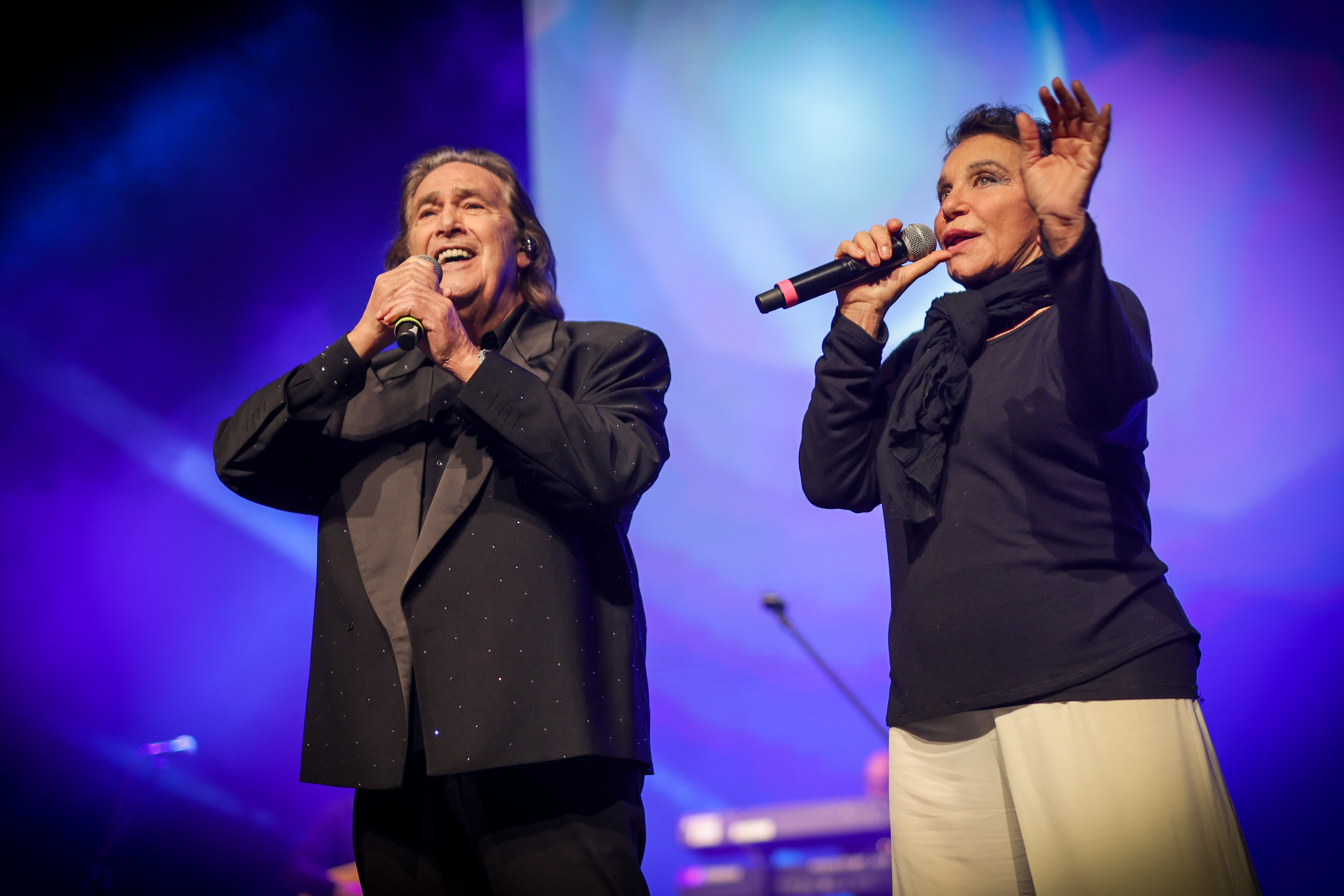
Ricchi e Poveri

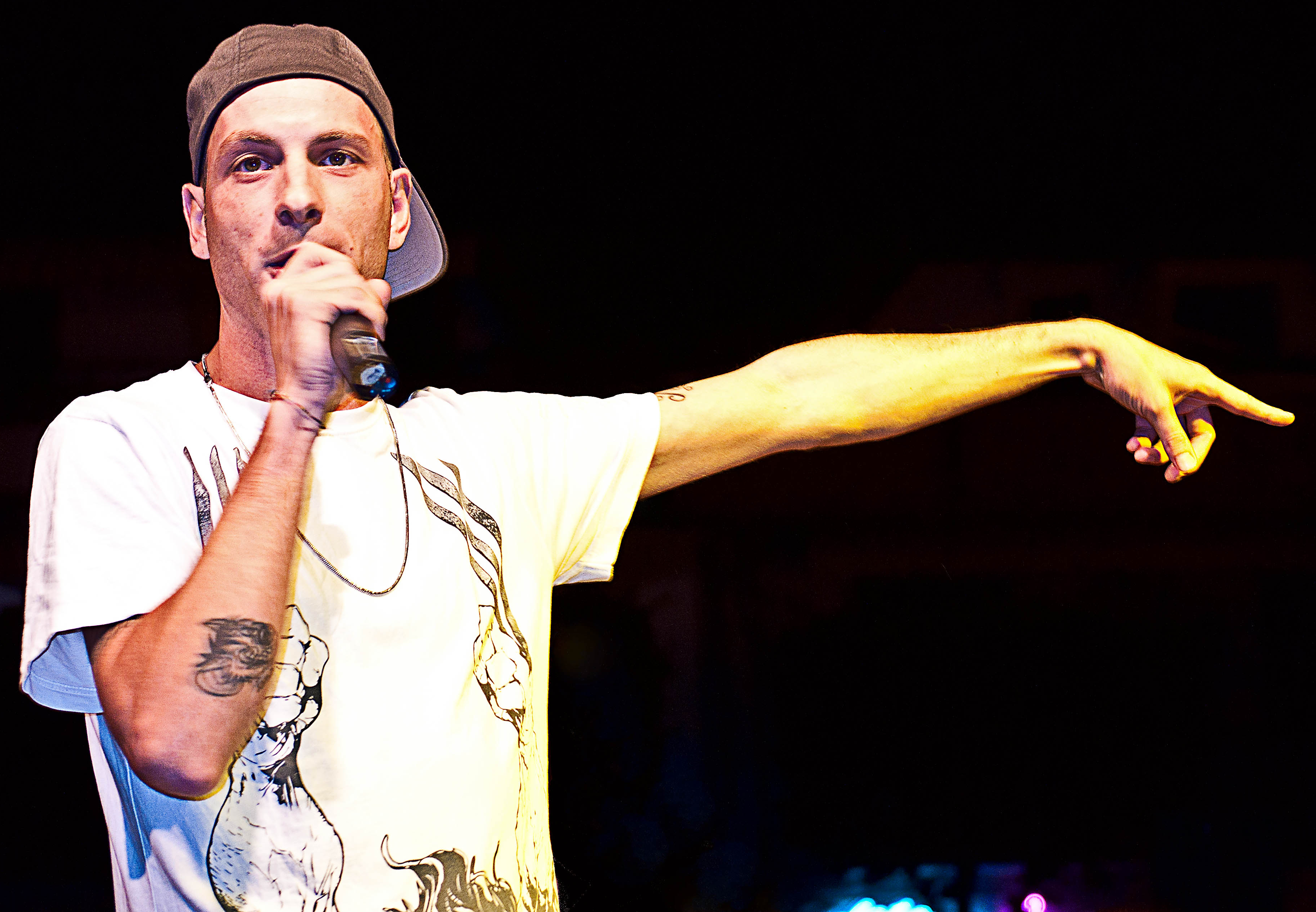
Clementino

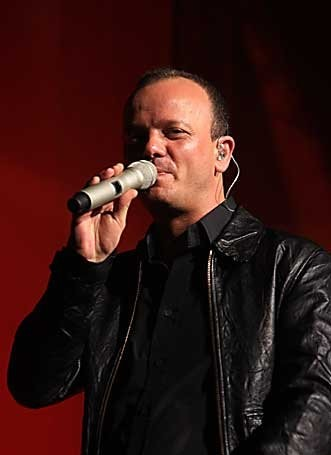
Gigi D'Alessio

Loredana Bertè

== Teams ==
- Winner
- Finalists
- Eliminated in the Final

Coaches	Top 12 artists		
Ricchi e Poveri	Ginevra Dabalà	Vincenzo Alighieri	Lorena Fernandez
Clementino	Ranya Moufidi	Zinnedine Fatnassi	Rosario Caci
Gigi D'Alessio	Ilary Alaimo	Andrea Galiano	Marta Maria La Rosa
Loredana Bertè	Melissa Agliottone	Mia Arnone	Fedora Copparosa

== Blind auditions ==
Blind auditions premiered on March 4, Each coach must have three artists on their team at the end of the blind auditions. With each coach given one "Block" to use in the entire blind auditions.

Blind auditions color key
✔	Coach pressed "I WANT YOU" button
	Artist defaulted to a coach's team
	Artist elected this coach's team
	Artist eliminated as no coach pressing their button
✘	Coach pressed "I WANT YOU" button, but was blocked by Ricchi e Poveri
✘	Coach pressed "I WANT YOU" button, but was blocked by Clementino
✘	Coach pressed "I WANT YOU" button, but was blocked by Gigi
✘	Coach pressed "I WANT YOU" button, but was blocked by Loredana

Blind auditions results
Episode	Order	Artist	Age	Hometown	Song	Coach's and contestant's choices			
Episode	Order	Artist	Age	Hometown	Song	Ricchi e Poveri	Clementino	Gigi	Loredana
Episode 1 (March 4)	1	Mia Arnone	7	Castrofilippo	"Ciao ciao"	✔	✔	✔	✔
Episode 1 (March 4)	2	Andrea Galiano	12	Coccaglio	"La notte"	✔	✔	✔	✔
Episode 1 (March 4)	3	Ranya Moufidi	12	Ciserano	"Easy on Me"	✔	✔	✔	✔
Episode 1 (March 4)	4	Italobartolomeo Fucile	11	Messina	"Eri piccola così"	—	—	—	—
Episode 1 (March 4)	5	Vincenzo Alighieri	13	Oria	"Quando vedrai la mia ragazza"	✔	—	✔	—
Episode 1 (March 4)	6	Ilary Alaimo	14	Montedoro	"I Will Always Love You"	✔	✔	✔	✔
Episode 1 (March 4)	7	Gregorio and Sabina Cattaneo Della Volta	13, 10	Segrate	"Brividi"	—	—	—	—
Episode 1 (March 4)	8	Ginevra Dabalà	11	Loreggia	"Il cerchio della vita"	✔	—	✔	—
Episode 1 (March 4)	9	Zinnedine Fatnassi	12	Milan	"Cara Italia"	✔	✔	✔	✔
Episode 1 (March 4)	10	Fedora Copparosa	12	Corbetta	"Nessun grado di separazione"	✔	—	✔	✔
Episode 1 (March 4)	11	Sofia Fronzi	12	Senigallia	"Giovani Wannabe"	—	—	—	—
Episode 1 (March 4)	12	Melissa Agliottone	12	Sant'Elpidio a Mare	"Fallin'"	✔	✔	✘	✔
Episode 1 (March 4)	13	Rosario Caci	9	Gela	"Abbracciame"	✔	✔	✘	Team full
Episode 1 (March 4)	14	Lorena Fernandez	12	Portico di Caserta	"Tu sì 'na cosa grande"	✔	Team full	✘	Team full
Episode 1 (March 4)	15	Claudio Allatta	12	Catania	"Your Song"	Team full	Team full	—	Team full
Episode 1 (March 4)	16	Marta Maria La Rosa	12	Comiso	"Emozioni"	Team full	Team full	✔	Team full

== Finale ==
The finale aired on March 11, 2023. The finale consisted of two rounds, the battles and the final. In round one, the 3 contestants on each team verse each other. The winner is determined by their coach and the chosen artist moves on into the final round. In the final round, the final four artists sing their blind audition song for their final chance of winning the show. At the end, the winner of the season was announced.

First round

Artist won the battle and advanced to the final round
Artist lost the battle and was eliminated

Episode	Coach	Order	Artist	Song	Result
Episode 2 (March 11)	Ricchi e Poveri	1	Lorena Fernandez	"Un amore così grande"	Eliminated
Episode 2 (March 11)	Clementino	2	Ranya Moufidi	"Ovunque sarai"	Advanced
Episode 2 (March 11)	Loredana Bertè	3	Mia Arnone	"Il ballo del mattone"	Eliminated
Episode 2 (March 11)	Gigi D'Alessio	4	Andrea Galiano	"I tuoi particolari"	Eliminated
Episode 2 (March 11)	Ricchi e Poveri	5	Ginevra Dabalà	"The Show Must Go On"	Advanced
Episode 2 (March 11)	Clementino	6	Rosario Caci	"Non dirgli mai"	Eliminated
Episode 2 (March 11)	Gigi D'Alessio	7	Ilary Alaimo	"Io domani"	Advanced
Episode 2 (March 11)	Ricchi e Poveri	8	Vincenzo Alighieri	"Fatti mandare dalla mamma a prendere il latte"	Eliminated
Episode 2 (March 11)	Loredana Bertè	9	Melissa Agliottone	"Shallow"	Advanced
Episode 2 (March 11)	Loredana Bertè	10	Fedora Copparosa	"Amare"	Eliminated
Episode 2 (March 11)	Gigi D'Alessio	11	Marta Maria La Rosa	"La sera dei miracoli"	Eliminated
Episode 2 (March 11)	Clementino	12	Zinnedine Fatnassi	"Fenomeno"	Eliminated

Second round

Winner
Runners-up

Episode	Coach	Order	Artist	Song	Result
Episode 2 (March 11)	Ricchi e Poveri	1	Ginevra Dabalà	"Il cerchio della vita"	Finalists
Episode 2 (March 11)	Gigi D'Alessio	2	Ilary Alaimo	"I Will Always Love You"	Finalists
Episode 2 (March 11)	Clementino	3	Ranya Moufidi	"Ovunque sarai"	Finalists
Episode 2 (March 11)	Loredana Bertè	4	Melissa Agliottone	"Fallin'"	Winner
