= Alfa (singer) =

Italian singer and rapper (born 2000)

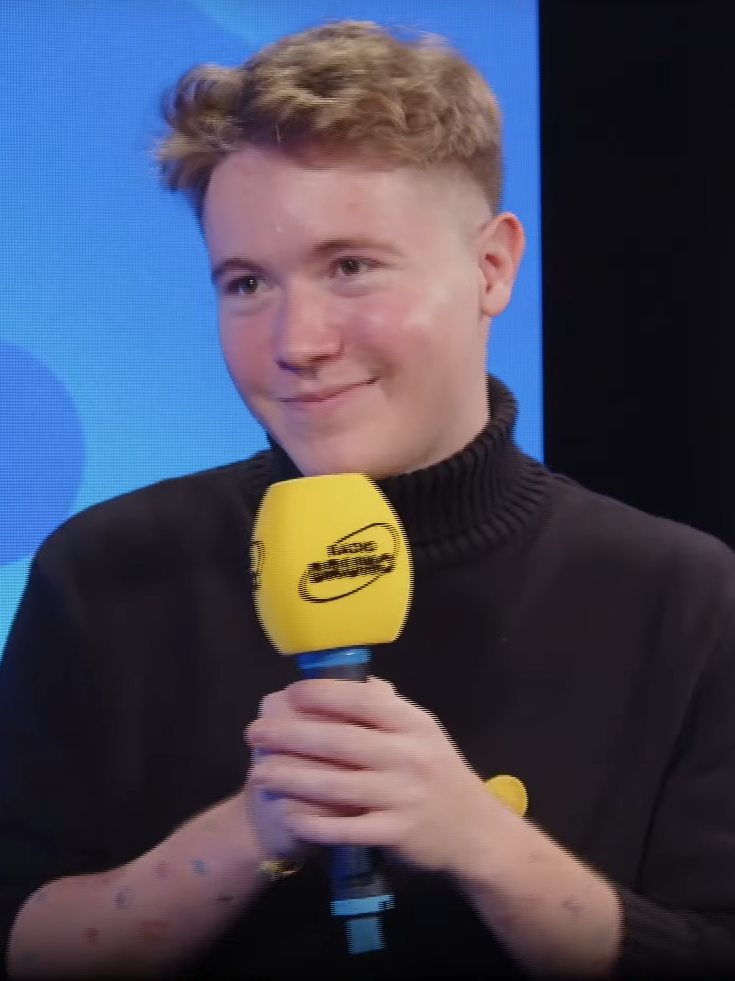
- Alfa at the Sanremo Music Festival 2024

Background information
- Born: Andrea De Filippi; 22 August 2000 (age 26); Genoa, Italy
- Genres: Indie pop; pop rap
- Occupations: Singer; songwriter; rapper
- Instruments: Vocals; guitar; ukulele; piano
- Years active: 2014–present
- Labels: Wanderlust Society; Artist First

Andrea De Filippi (born 22 August 2000), known professionally as Alfa, is an Italian singer, songwriter and rapper.

== Early life ==
De Filippi grew up in the Quarto dei Mille district of Genoa. His father is a nurse and his mother is a psychologist. He originally wanted to be a doctor before pursuing music. He began playing the guitar and piano at the age of eight. He attended a liceo classico and originally enrolled at Bocconi University to study economics and management for arts, culture and communication, but later dropped out to pursue music full time.

== Career ==
In 2020, De Filippi wrote "Sul più bello", the theme of the romantic comedy film Out of My League.

His 2023 single "Bellissimissima" reached number four on the Italian Singles Chart. De Filippi was one of 30 artists to compete at the Sanremo Music Festival 2024, with the song "Vai!". The song finished in tenth position in the competition, and reached the top ten of the Italian singles chart. The single releases of "Sofia" and "Vai!" both preceded the release of his third studio album Non so chi ha creato il mondo ma so che era innamorato on 16 February 2024, with "Vabbè ciao" released as the third single on 24 May 2024. "Il filo rosso", a song released in October 2024, has reached the peak position of charts in Italy. In 2025, the song "A me mi piace" featuring Manu Chao peaked again at number one, becoming a summer hit.

== Discography ==
=== Studio albums ===
List of studio albums, with selected details and peak chart positions
| Title | Album details | Peak chart positions |
| Title | Album details | ITA |
|---|---|---|
| Before Wanderlust (with Yanomi) | Released: 13 December 2019; Label: Wanderlust Society; Format: Digital download, streaming | 20 |
| Nord | Released: 14 May 2021; Label: Artist First, Wanderlust Society; Format: Digital download, streaming, LP, CD | 14 |
| Non so chi ha creato il mondo ma so che era innamorato | Released: 16 February 2024; Label: Artist First, A1 Entertainment Spa; Format: Digital download, streaming, LP, CD | 1 |

=== Mixtapes ===
List of mixtapes
| Title | Album details |
|---|---|
| Mondo Immobile Mixtape | Released: 15 January 2017; Format: Digital download, streaming |
| Alfa-Omega | Released: 14 October 2017; Format: Digital download, streaming |

=== Singles ===
List of singles as lead artist, with selected chart positions, showing year released and album name
| Title | Year | Peak chart positions | | | | | | | | | | Certifications | Album |
| Title | Year | ITA | CIS Air. | FRA | KAZ Air. | LAT Air. | LTU Air. | MDA Air. | RUS Air. | SWI | UKR Air. | Certifications | Album |
|---|---|---|---|---|---|---|---|---|---|---|---|---|---|
| "Dove sei?" | 2018 | — | — | — | * | — | — | * | — | — | — | FIMI: Gold | Non-album singles |
| "Prima o poi" (featuring ¥em) | 2018 | — | — | — | * | — | — | * | — | — | — | | Non-album singles |
| "Disegno" | 2018 | — | — | — | * | — | — | * | — | — | — | | Before Wanderlust |
| "Tempo al tempo" | 2019 | — | — | — | * | — | — | * | — | — | — | | Before Wanderlust |
| "Testa tra le nuvole, Pt. 1" | 2019 | 73 | — | — | * | — | — | * | — | — | — | FIMI: Platinum | Before Wanderlust |
| "Cin cin" | 2019 | 10 | — | — | * | — | — | * | — | — | — | FIMI: 4× Platinum | Before Wanderlust |
| "Wanderlust!" | 2019 | 49 | — | — | * | — | — | * | — | — | — | FIMI: Gold | Before Wanderlust |
| "Il giro del mondo" | 2019 | 100 | — | — | * | — | — | * | — | — | — | FIMI: Gold | Before Wanderlust |
| "Testa tra le nuvole, Pt. 2" | 2020 | 11 | — | — | * | — | — | * | — | — | — | FIMI: Platinum | Nord |
| "Sul più bello (Out of My League)" | 2020 | 50 | — | — | * | — | — | * | — | — | — | FIMI: Platinum | Sul più bello |
| "San Lorenzo" (featuring Annalisa) | 2020 | 53 | — | — | * | — | — | * | — | — | — | FIMI: Platinum | Nord |
| "Snob" (featuring Rosa Chemical) | 2021 | — | — | — | * | — | — | * | — | — | — | | Nord |
| "Bevo tutta la notte" (featuring Drast and Olly) | 2021 | — | — | — | * | — | — | * | — | — | — | | Nord |
| "Ci sarò" | 2021 | 97 | — | — | * | — | — | * | — | — | — | FIMI: Platinum | Non-album singles |
| "Lentiggini" (with Fudasca and Tredici Pietro) | 2021 | — | — | — | * | — | — | * | — | — | — | | Non-album singles |
| "Serenata" | 2022 | — | — | — | * | — | — | * | — | — | — | | Sempre più bello |
| "Parigi" | 2022 | — | — | — | * | — | — | * | — | — | — | FIMI: Gold | Non-album singles |
| "You Make Me So Happy" | 2022 | — | — | — | * | — | — | * | — | — | — | | Non-album singles |
| "Cerco un posto" | 2022 | — | — | — | * | — | — | * | — | — | — | | Non-album singles |
| "5 minuti" | 2022 | — | — | — | * | — | — | * | — | — | — | | Non-album singles |
| "Le cose in comune" | 2023 | — | — | — | — | — | — | — | — | — | — | FIMI: Gold | Non-album singles |
| "Bellissimissima" | 2023 | 4 | — | — | — | — | — | — | — | — | — | FIMI: 5× Platinum | Non-album singles |
| "Sofia" | 2023 | 63 | — | — | — | — | — | — | — | — | — | | Non so chi ha creato il mondo ma so che era innamorato |
| "Vai!" | 2024 | 9 | — | — | — | — | — | — | — | 72 | — | FIMI: 2× Platinum | Non so chi ha creato il mondo ma so che era innamorato |
| "Sogna, ragazzo, sogna" (with Roberto Vecchioni) | 2024 | 34 | — | — | — | — | — | — | — | — | — | FIMI: Gold | Non-album single |
| "Vabbe' ciao" | 2024 | 65 | — | — | — | — | — | — | — | — | — | FIMI: Gold | Non so chi ha creato il mondo ma so che era innamorato |
| "Il filo rosso" | 2024 | 1 | — | — | — | — | — | — | — | — | — | FIMI: 2× Platinum | Non so chi ha creato il mondo ma so che era innamorato |
| "A me mi piace" (featuring Manu Chao) | 2025 | 1 | 2 | 162 | 7 | 6 | 25 | 23 | 1 | — | 74 | FIMI: 2× Platinum | Non so chi ha creato il mondo ma so che era innamorato |
| "Buon vento" (with Jovanotti) | 2026 | 12 | — | — | — | — | — | — | — | — | — | FIMI: Gold | Non-album singles |
| "Genova e Napoli" (with Gigi D'Alessio) | 2026 | 35 | — | — | — | — | — | — | — | — | — | | Non-album singles |
| "Eri solo da incontrare" | 2026 | 2 | — | — | — | — | — | — | — | — | — | | Non-album singles |
"—" denotes a recording that did not chart or was not released in that territory. "*" denotes the chart did not exist at that time.
