= Vai! =

Single by Alfa

from the album Non so chi ha creato il mondo ma so che era innamorato
- Language: Italian
- Released: 7 February 2024
- Length: 2:37
- Label: Artist First
- Songwriters: Alfa; Ian Brendon Scott; Mark Jackson
- Producers: Ian Brendon Scott; Mark Jackson; Andrea Debernardi

Alfa singles chronology
"Sofia" (2023)	"Vai!" (2024)	"Sogna, ragazzo, sogna" (2024)

Music video
- "Vai!" on YouTube

"Vai!" ("Go!") is a 2025 song by Italian singer Alfa, released by Artist First on 7 February 2024 as the second single from his third studio album Non so chi ha creato il mondo ma so che era innamorato. It competed in the Sanremo Music Festival 2024, placing 10th.

== Music video ==
A music video of "Vai!", directed by Filiberto Signorelli, was released on the same day via Alfa's YouTube channel. It was shot at the parachuting school in Casale Monferrato, Piedmont.

== Charts ==
=== Weekly charts ===
Chart performance for "Vai!"
Chart (2025)	Peak position
Italy (FIMI)	9
Italy Airplay (EarOne)	10
Switzerland (Schweizer Hitparade)	72

=== Year-end charts ===
Chart performance for "Vai!"
Chart (2024)	Position
Italy (FIMI)	19

== Certifications ==
Certifications for "Vai!"
Region	Certification	Certified units/sales
Italy (FIMI)	2× Platinum	200,000^{‡}
^{‡} Sales+streaming figures based on certification alone.
