= Il filo rosso =

Single by Alfa

from the album Non so chi ha creato il mondo ma so che era innamorato
- Released: 18 October 2024
- Length: 3:07
- Label: Artist First
- Composers: Alfa; Emanuele Dabbono; Tommaso Cassissa
- Lyricists: Pietro Posani; Raffaele Trapasso; Pietro Celona
- Producer: Pietro Celona

Alfa singles chronology
"Vabbè ciao" (2024)	"Il filo rosso" (2024)	"A me mi piace" (2025)

Music video
- "Il filo rosso" on YouTube

"Il filo rosso" is a song by Italian singer Alfa. It was released on 18 October 2024 and later included in the digital re-issue of his third studio album Non so chi ha creato il mondo ma so che era innamorato.

It topped the Italian singles chart.

== Music video ==
The official music video, directed by Filiberto Signorello, was released on the same day via the singer's YouTube channel.

== Track listing ==
No.	Title	Length
1.	"Il filo rosso"	3:07
2.	"Il filo rosso (Live)"	4:21

== Charts ==
=== Weekly charts ===
Weekly chart performance for "Il filo rosso"
Chart (2024–25)	Peak position
Italy (FIMI)	1
Italy Airplay (EarOne)	14

=== Year-end charts ===
Year-end chart performance for "Il filo rosso"
Chart	Year	Position
Italy (FIMI)	2024	88
Italy (FIMI)	2025	8

== Certifications ==
Certifications for "Il filo rosso"
Region	Certification	Certified units/sales
Italy (FIMI)	2× Platinum	400,000^{‡}
^{‡} Sales+streaming figures based on certification alone.
