= Bellissimissima =

Single by Alfa
- Released: 12 May 2023
- Length: 2:37
- Label: Artist First
- Songwriters: Alfa; Davide Epicoco; Marco Azara; Raffaele Trapasso; Iacopo Falsetti; Frè Monti
- Producers: Room9; False

Alfa singles chronology
"Le cose in comune" (2023)	"Bellissimissima" (2023)	"Sofia" (2023)

Music video
- "Bellissimissima" on YouTube

"Bellissimissima" is a song by Italian singer Alfa. It was released by Artist First on 12 May 2023.

The song peaked at number 4 on the Italian singles chart, becoming a summer hit.

== Music video ==
The official music video, directed by Filiberto Signorello, was released on the same day via the singer's YouTube channel. It was shot in Gardaland and starred Sofia Cerio, former contestant of the television show Il collegio.

== Charts ==
=== Weekly charts ===
Weekly chart performance for "Bellissimissima"
Chart (2023)	Peak position
Italy (FIMI)	4
Italy Airplay (EarOne)	19

=== Year-end charts ===
2023 year-end chart performance for "Bellissimissima"
Chart (2023)	Position
Italy (FIMI)	18

2024 year-end chart performance for "Bellissimissima"
Chart (2024)	Position
Italy (FIMI)	51

== Certifications ==
Certifications for "Bellissimissima"
Region	Certification	Certified units/sales
Italy (FIMI)	5× Platinum	500,000^{‡}
^{‡} Sales+streaming figures based on certification alone.
