= A me mi piace =

Single by Alfa featuring Manu Chao

from the album Non so chi ha creato il mondo ma so che era innamorato
- Released: 9 May 2025
- Length: 2:20
- Label: Artist First
- Songwriters: Alfa; Manu Chao
- Producer: Room9

Alfa singles chronology
"Il filo rosso" (2024)	"A me mi piace" (2025)

Manu Chao singles chronology
"Viva tu" (2024)	"A me mi piace" (2025)

Music video
- "A me mi piace" on YouTube

"A me mi piace" is a song by Italian singer Alfa with featured vocals by Spanish singer Manu Chao. It was released on 9 May 2025 and included in the deluxe edition of his third studio album Non so chi ha creato il mondo ma so che era innamorato. The song was written by the artists and produced by Room9.

The song's chorus uses the same melody of Manu Chao's 2001 hit "Me Gustas Tú".

It topped the Italian Singles Chart and Russian Airplay Chart, becoming the most played song on Italian radio in 2025.

== Music video ==
The music video for "A me mi piace", directed by Filiberto Signorello, was released on 9 May 2025 via Alfa's YouTube channel. It was shot in Genoa in various locations including the historic centre, the Luzzati Gardens and the Stadio Luigi Ferraris.

== Charts ==
=== Weekly charts ===
Weekly chart performance for "A me mi piace"
Chart (2025)	Peak position
Belarus Airplay (TopHit)	5
CIS Airplay (TopHit)	2
France (SNEP)	162
Italy (FIMI)	1
Kazakhstan Airplay (TopHit)	7
Latvia Airplay (TopHit)	6
Lithuania Airplay (TopHit)	25
Moldova Airplay (TopHit)	23
North Macedonia Airplay (Radiomonitor)	3
Romania Airplay (TopHit)	118
Russia Airplay (TopHit)	1
San Marino Airplay (SMRTV Top 50)	1
Slovenia Airplay (Radiomonitor)	6
Ukraine Airplay (TopHit)	74

=== Monthly charts ===
Monthly chart performance for "A me mi piace"
Chart (2025–2026)	Peak position
Belarus Airplay (TopHit)	5
CIS Airplay (TopHit)	4
Kazakhstan Airplay (TopHit)	10
Latvia Airplay (TopHit)	15
Moldova Airplay (TopHit)	33
Russia Airplay (TopHit)	2
Ukraine Airplay (TopHit)	89

2026 monthly chart performance for "A me mi piace"
Chart (2026)	Peak position
Moldova Airplay (TopHit)	36

=== Year-end charts ===
Year-end chart performance for "A me mi piace"
Chart (2025)	Position
Belarus Airplay (TopHit)	48
CIS Airplay (TopHit)	53
Italy (FIMI)	9
Kazakhstan Airplay (TopHit)	125
Latvia Airplay (TopHit)	50
Russia Airplay (TopHit)	42

== Certifications ==
Region	Certification	Certified units/sales
Italy (FIMI)	2× Platinum	400,000^{‡}
^{‡} Sales+streaming figures based on certification alone.
