= Amare (La Rappresentante di Lista song) =

Single by La Rappresentante di Lista

from the album My Mamma
- Released: 4 March 2021
- Genre: Pop rock
- Length: 3:21
- Label: Woodworm, Numero Uno, Sony Music
- Songwriters: Veronica Lucchesi; Dario Mangiaracina; Roberto Cammarata; Dardust
- Producers: La Rappresentante di Lista; Dardust

La Rappresentante di Lista singles chronology
"Alieno" (2021)	"Amare" (2021)	"Vita" (2021)

"Amare" is a song by Italian band La Rappresentante di Lista. It was written by band members Veronica Lucchesi and Dario Mangiaracina with Roberto Cammarata and Dardust and produced by Lucchesi, Mangiaracina and Dardust.

It was released by Sony Music on 4 March 2021 as the second single from the fourth studio album My Mamma. The song was the band's entry for the Sanremo Music Festival 2021, the 71st edition of Italy's musical festival which doubles also as a selection of the act for Eurovision Song Contest, where it placed 11th in the grand final. "Amare" peaked at number 11 on the Italian FIMI Singles Chart and was certified platinum in Italy.

== Background ==
The band described "Amare" as "a song about bodies, life, community, the search for a rebirth, a sense of freedom and love". During an interview, they stated: "Amare is an emotional song, a passionate song and it's about rebirth. It had a very long gestation and found its ultimate expressive form together with Dardust, with its production".

== Music video ==
The music video for the song was released on YouTube on 4 March 2021, to accompany the single's release. It was directed by Alessandra Leone.

== Live performances ==
On 1 May 2021 the band performed the song during the annual Concerto del Primo Maggio.

== Track listing ==
Digital download
No.	Title	Length
1.	"Amare"	3:21

== Charts ==
Chart performance for "Amare"
Chart (2021)	Peak position
Italy (FIMI)	11
Italy Airplay (EarOne)	3
San Marino (SMRRTV Top 50)	3

== Certifications ==
Region	Certification	Certified units/sales
Italy (FIMI)	Platinum	70,000^{‡}
^{‡} Sales+streaming figures based on certification alone.
