= Antonella Clerici =

Italian journalist and television host (born 1963)

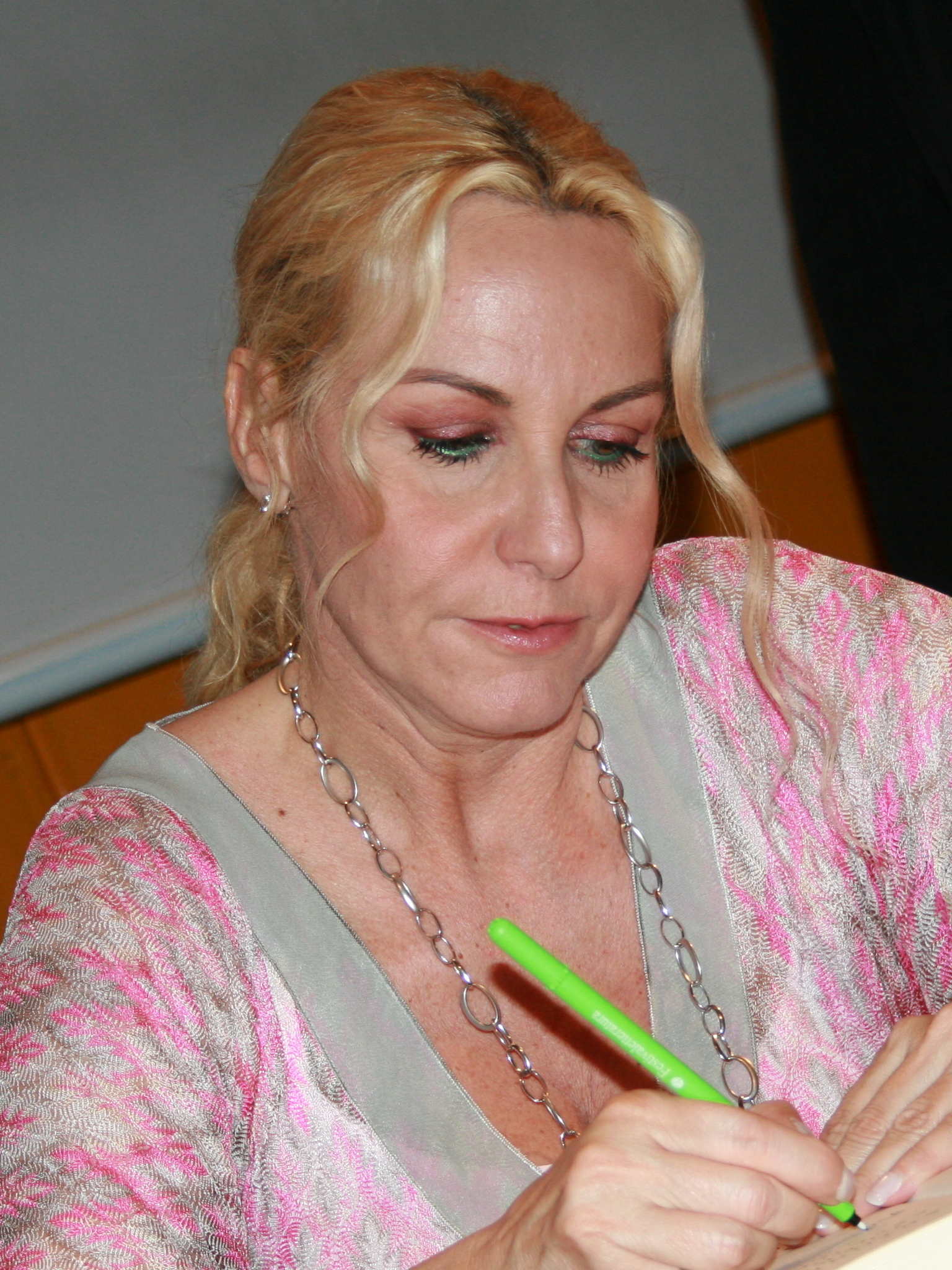
- Clerici signing a copy of her book Aspettando te. La mia storia più bella: diventare mamma (2010).
- Born: 6 December 1963 (age 62); Legnano, Italy
- Occupations: Television host; journalist
- Years active: 1985–present
- Known for: La prova del cuoco; Ti lascio una canzone; The Voice Senior; È sempre mezzogiorno
- Spouses: Giuseppe Motta (m. 1989; div. 1991) Sergio Cossa (m. 2000; div. 2005)
- Partners: Eddy Martens (2006–2016); Vittorio Garrone (2016–present)
- Children: 1

Antonella Clerici (Italian pronunciation: [antoˈnɛlla ˈklɛːritʃi]; born 6 December 1963) is an Italian television host and journalist, best known for her longtime activity as a cooking show presenter. She was the fourth woman to present Sanremo Music Festival (2010), after Loretta Goggi (1986), Raffaella Carrà (2001) and Simona Ventura (2004).

== Biography ==
She graduated in law, cum Laude, at the University of Milan. She debuted in 1985 on Telereporter as a TV announcer. In 1987, she switched to Rai 2 where she presented Semaforo giallo, Oggi sport and later two popular sports programmes, Dribbling and Domenica Sprint. During the same years, she also presented Ristorante Italia and Segreti per voi. Later she hosted Forza Italia on Odeon TV with Fabio Fazio and Walter Zenga.

Clerici returned to Rai 2 in 1995 with another show about football, Telegoal. From 1996 to 1998, she was one of the presenters of Unomattina, a daily Rai 1 morning show, and she followed the 1998 FIFA World Cup with the depth programme Occhio al mondiale, with Giorgio Tosatti and Gian Piero Galeazzi.

In 1999/2000, she switched to Mediaset where she hosted Ma quanto costa?, aired by Retequattro. She also hosted the daily programme Telegatti Story and the morning show A tu per tu, aired by Canale 5, along with Maria Teresa Ruta.

In 2000, she returned to RAI and began hosting La prova del cuoco, the Italian version of Ready Steady Cook. She successfully hosted until 2008, when she took a leave of absence to give birth to her first child.

During the 2000s (decade) she has also hosted other programmes for Rai 1, including Campioni per sempre: Galà dello Sport 2000, the Sunday show Domenica in, Adesso sposami, Il ristorante, Il treno dei desideri, Affari tuoi, Ti lascio una canzone and Tutti pazzi per la tele.

In 2005, she hosted the Sanremo Music Festival 2005, Italy's best-known song contest, with Paolo Bonolis. She returned in 2010 as the festival's sole presenter.

In March 2010, she released her first CD, Antonella Clerici, featuring television themes. In September 2011, she returned as the host of her most popular programme, La prova del cuoco. She has also released several cookbooks. A few years later, after the closing of La prova del cuoco, she launched a new cooking programme, È sempre mezzogiorno.

She co-hosted the first night of the Sanremo Music Festival 2025 alongside Carlo Conti and Gerry Scotti.

== Personal life ==
She considers herself Roman Catholic and devoted to blessed Carlo Acutis.

== Films ==
- Happily N'Ever After 2: Snow White—Another Bite @ the Apple (2009) as Snow White
- Turbo (2013) as Burn
- Natale col Boss (2015) as Mrs. Tappabuco

== Television ==
- Semaforo giallo (1987)
- Oggi sport (1987–1989)
- Dribbling (1989–1995)
- Domenica Sprint (1990–1997)
- Ristorante Italia
- Segreti per voi
- Supergiganti 1994 (1994)
- Telegoal (1995)
- Mediterranea 1995 (1995)
- Circo bianco (1995–1996)
- Fantacalcio (1996)
- Unomattina (1997–1999)
- Premio Regia Televisiva (1997, 1999, 2007)
- Domenica In (1997–1998, 2001–2002)
- Occhio al mondiale (1998)
- Ma quanto costa? (1999)
- Telegatti Story (2000)
- A tu per tu (2000)
- La prova del cuoco (2000–2008, 2010–2018)
- Campioni per sempre: Galà dello Sport (2000)
- Per Natale cucino io (2003)
- Adesso sposami (2003–2004)
- La prova del cuoco – cotta e mangiata (2004)
- Il ristorante (2004–2005)
- Festival di Sanremo 2005 (2005)
- Il treno dei desideri (2006–2007)
- Affari tuoi (2006)
- Ti lascio una canzone (2008–2015)
- Tutti pazzi per la tele (2008–2009)
- Festival di Sanremo 2010 (2010)
- Arena di Verona 2010 (2010)

== Discography ==
=== Albums ===
- Antonella Clerici (2010)

== Books ==
- Oggi cucini tu (2005)
- Oggi cucini tu 2 (2006)
- Oggi cucini tu light (2006)
- Oggi cucini tu 3 (2007)
- Aspettando te (2010)
- Le ricette di Casa Clerici (2010)
