= Ti rincontrerò =

Ti rincontrerò may refer to:

- Ti rincontrerò (album), an album by Marco Carta
- "Ti rincontrerò" (song), a song from the album by Marco Carta
