= Sincerità (album) =

Studio album by Arisa
- Released: 20 February 2009
- Recorded: 2008
- Genre: Pop; jazz; swing
- Length: 37:06
- Label: Warner Music
- Producer: Giuseppe Mangiaracina; Maurizio Filardo

Arisa chronology
Sincerità (2009)	Malamorenò (2010)

Singles from Sincerità
- 1. "Sincerità" Released: 16 February 2009; 2. "Io sono" Released: 19 April 2009; 3. "Te lo volevo dire" Released: 19 June 2009

Sincerità ("Sincerity") is the debut album released by Italian singer Arisa, released on 20 February 2009. It features the singles "Sincerità", "Io sono" and "Te lo volevo dire". The album was certified gold by the Federation of the Italian Music Industry for domestic sales exceeding 30,000 units.

== Track listing ==
All lyrics are written by Giuseppe Anastasi, except where noted; all music is composed by Anastasi, Giuseppe Mangiaracina and Maurizio Filardo.

No.	Title	Length
1.	"Sincerità"	3:19
2.	"La mia strana verità"	3:28
3.	"Io sono"	3:32
4.	"Abbi cura di te" (lyrics: Marco Conidi)	3:59
5.	"Pensa così"	4:35
6.	"Piccola rosa" (lyrics: Anastasi, Filardo)	4:14
7.	"Te lo volevo dire" (lyrics: Conidi)	3:30
8.	"Com'è facile"	3:32
9.	"L'uomo che non c'è"	3:19
10.	"Buona notte"	3:54

== Charts ==
Chart	Peak position
Italian Albums Chart	5
Swiss Albums Chart	94
