= The Voice Senior (Italian TV series) season 6 =

The Voice Senior
- Season 6
- Promotional poster featuring coaches (clockwise from left) Arisa, Clementino & Hunt, Nek, and Bertè
- Presented by: Antonella Clerici
- Coaches: Clementino & Rocco Hunt; Arisa; Nek; Loredana Bertè
- Winner: Francesco De Siena
- Winning coach: Nek
- Runner-up: Pierluigi Lunedei

Release
- Original network: Rai 1
- Original release: 14 November – 19 December 2025

Season chronology
- Next → Season 7

The sixth season of the Italian singing competition The Voice Senior began airing on 14 November 2025, on Rai 1. Arisa and Loredana Bertè returned as coaches from the previous season, along with Clementino who, this season, became a duo coach with Rocco Hunt. Nek was announced to replace exiting coach Gigi D'Alessio for the season.

Francesco De Siena was named the winner of the season, marking Nek's first win as a coach. With De Siena's win, Nek became the first coach on the senior version of the show to win on their debut season.

== Coaches ==
The Voice Senior season 6 coaches

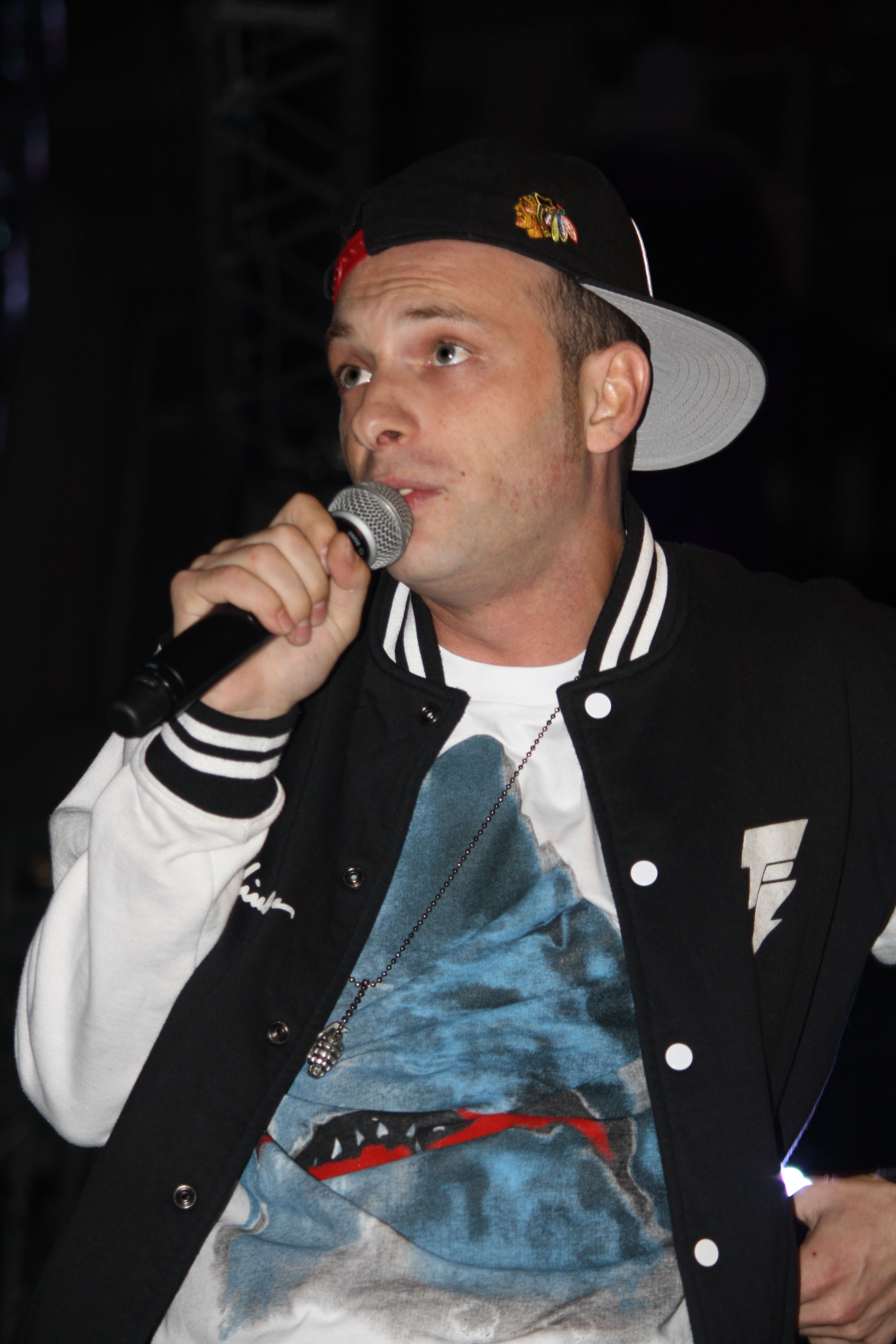
Clementino (duo)

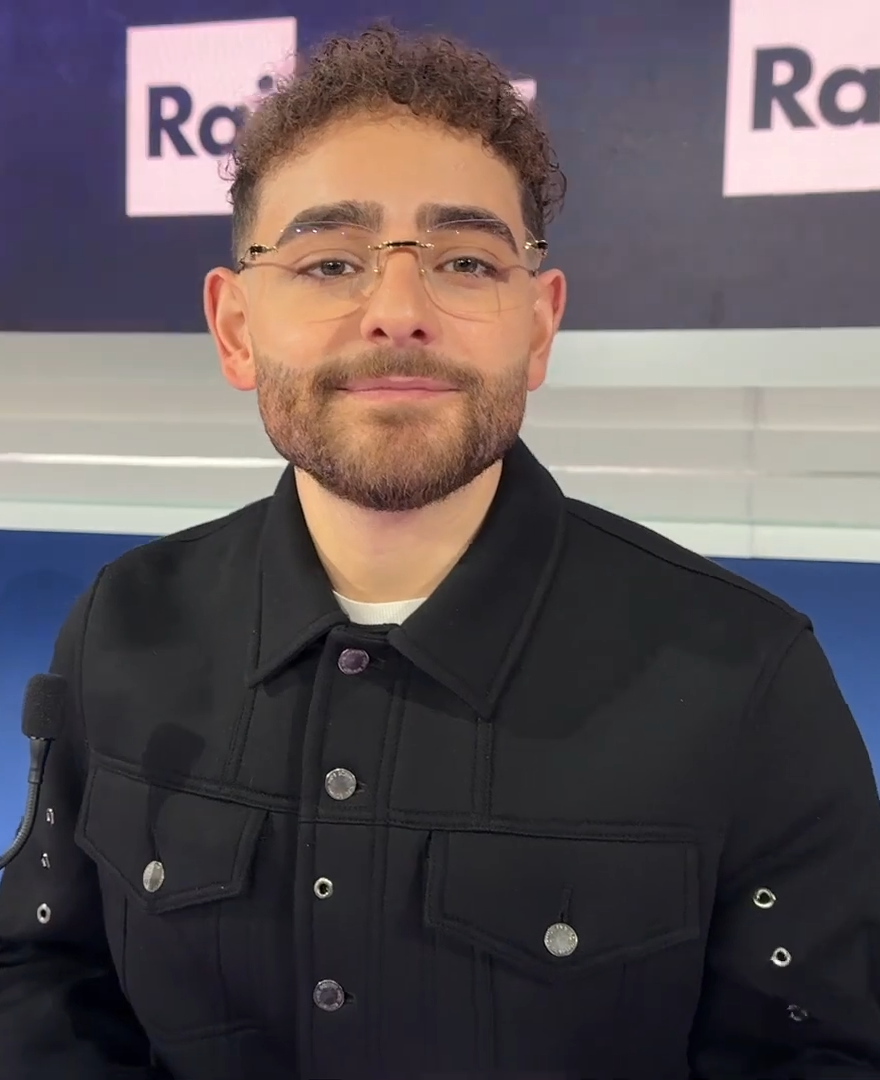
Rocco Hunt (duo)

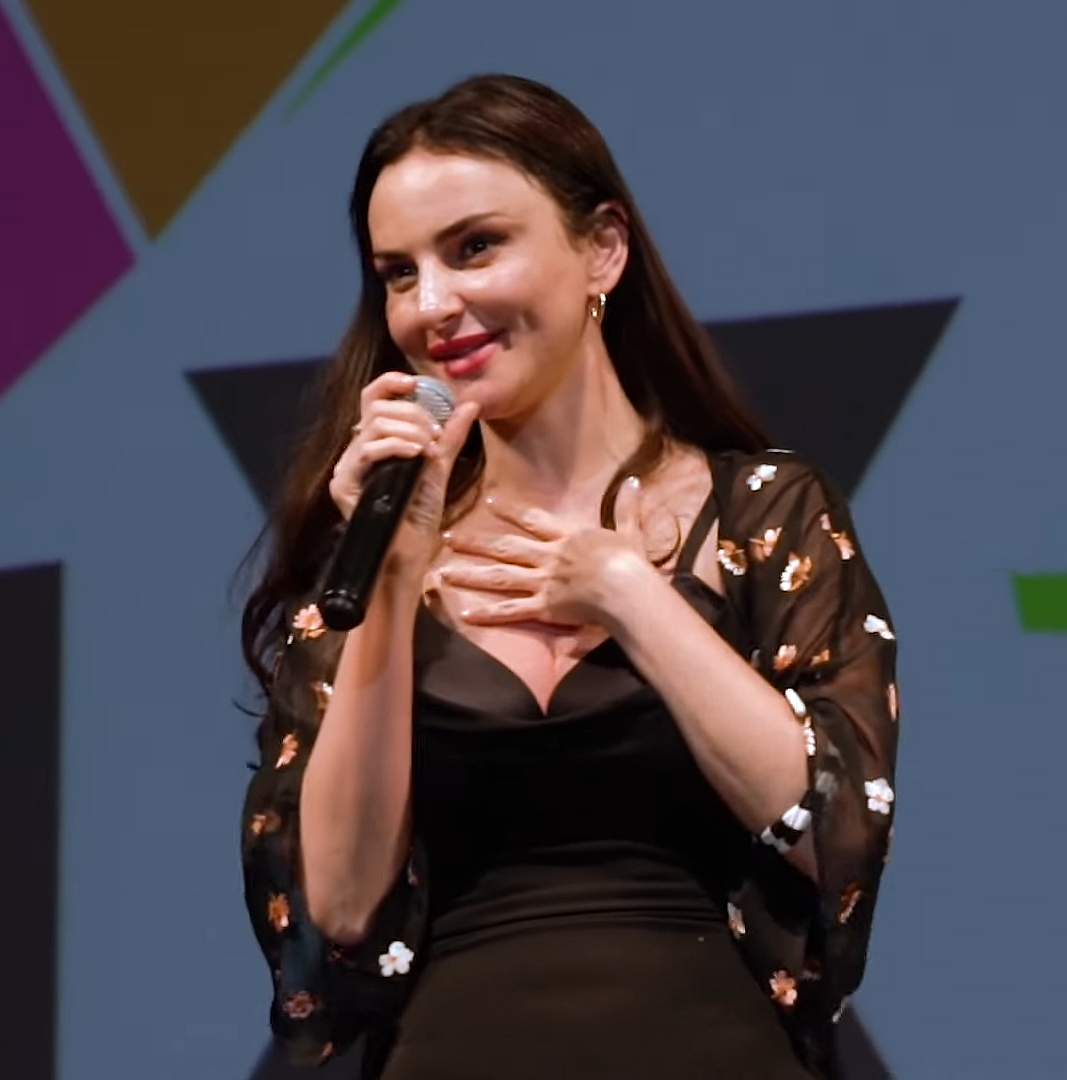
Arisa

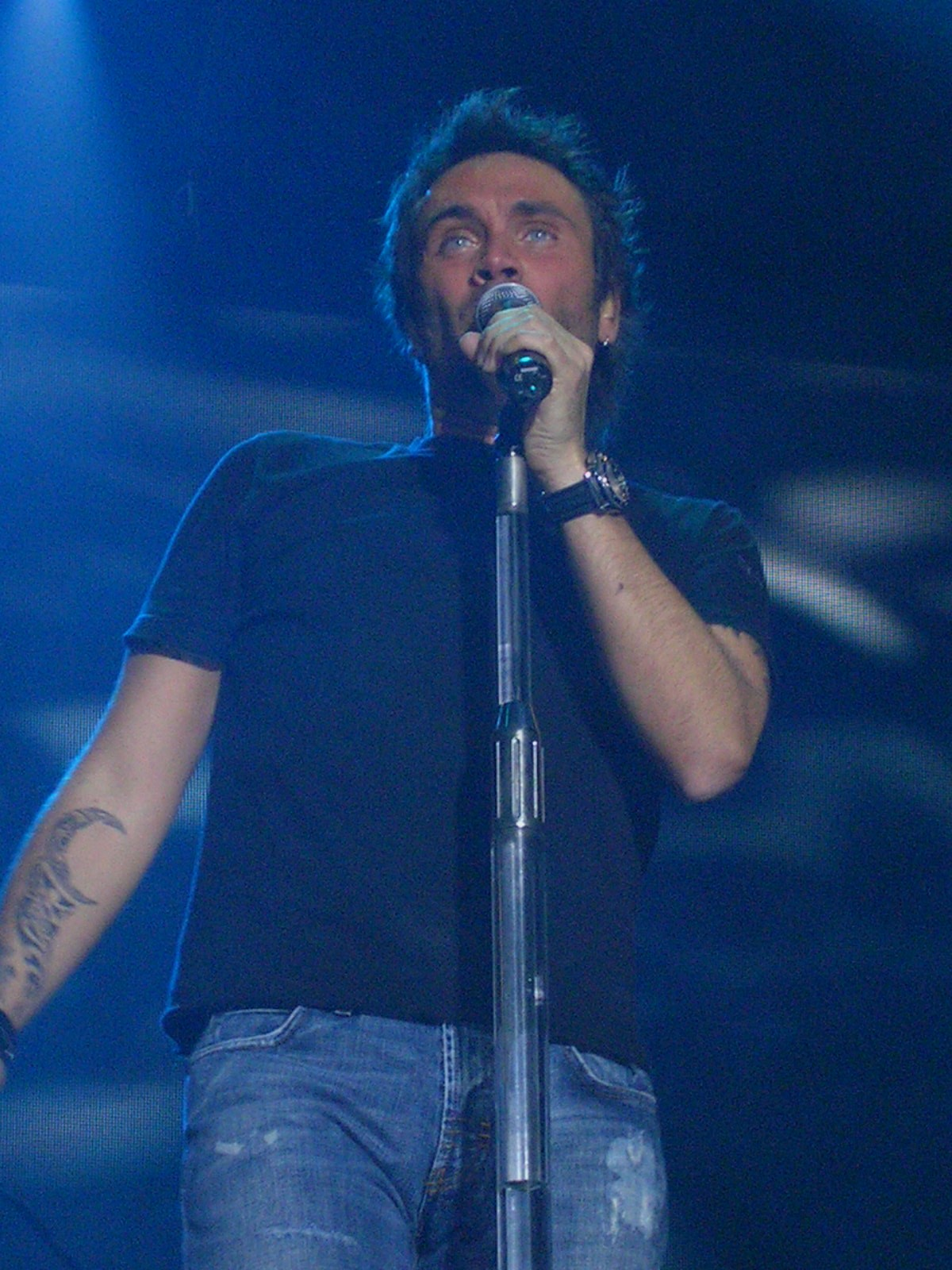
Nek

Loredana Bertè

Following the conclusion of the fifth season in early 2025, Rai 1 announced that The Voice Senior would for its sixth season. After, it was confirmed that Loredana Bertè and Arisa would return for their sixth and third seasons on the show, respectively. Clementino also returned for his sixth season, but joined this season as a duo coach with debuting coach Rocco Hunt. Gigi D'Alessio exited the panel this season and was replaced by debuting coach Nek.

== Teams ==
- Winner
- Runner-up
- Third place
- Fourth place
- Eliminated in the Final
- Eliminated in the Knockouts
- Eliminated in the Cut

Coaches	Top 40 Artists				
Clementino & Rocco Hunt					
Clementino & Rocco Hunt	Pierluigi Lunedei	Carmelo Sciplino	Cosimo Ventruti	Anthony Jaffa	Alessandra Aldrelli
Clementino & Rocco Hunt	Flora Faja	Felicita Farina	Giuseppe De Rosa	Franco Romanelli	Elisabetta La Farina
Arisa					
Arisa	Giovanna Russo	Anna Rossicchi	Sonia Milan	Roberta Cavalli e Pasquale Di Monte	Giuseppe Nucci
Arisa	Tiziana Rosati	Patrizia Palmieri	Renzo Dell'Erba	Anna Maria Facciolà	Ottavio Nuzzolese
Nek					
Nek	Francesco De Siena	Tiziano Cavaliere	Jacqueline Schweitzer	Franco Rapillo	Mauro Cianciabella
Nek	Lorena Lovison	Raffaele Dell'Erba	Tiziano Cantatore	Paola Troilo	Alessandro Casalini
Loredana Bertè					
Loredana Bertè	Gabriella Vai	Francesca De Fazi	Francesca Visentini	Maria Masullo	Glori Sorgato
Loredana Bertè	Marcello Monti	Nancy Cuomo	Elisa Albonico	Paola Conte	Giancarlo Del Vecchio

== Blind auditions ==
The blind auditions premiered on 14 November 2025. Each coach must have ten artists on their team at the end of the blind auditions. Each coach is given one "block" to use in the entire blind auditions, and a "Second Chance" button which allows them to press the button for an artist that failed to make a team after his/her audition. The artist then auditions a second time with the goal of advancing. Ultimately, only Arisa and Nek used their "Second Chance" buttons during the blind auditions.

Blind auditions color key
✔	Coach pressed "I WANT YOU" button
	Artist defaulted to a coach's team
	Artist elected this coach's team
	Artist eliminated as no coach pressing their button
	The artist was selected for a team in the blind auditions, but was not chosen by his coach to advance to the knockouts.
🟢	Coach pressed the "Second Chance" button after artist was previously eliminated
✘	Coach pressed "I WANT YOU" button, but was blocked by Cleme & Rocco
✘	Coach pressed "I WANT YOU" button, but was blocked by Arisa
✘	Coach pressed "I WANT YOU" button, but was blocked by Nek
✘	Coach pressed "I WANT YOU" button, but was blocked by Loredana

Blind auditions results
Episode	Order	Artist	Song	Coaches' and artist's choices			
Episode	Order	Artist	Song	Cleme & Rocco	Arisa	Nek	Loredana
Episode 1 (14 November)	1	Gabriella Vai	"Se stasera sono qui"	✔	✔	✔	✔
Episode 1 (14 November)	2	Patrizia Palmieri	"Nuovo Cinema Paradiso"	–	✔	✔	–
Episode 1 (14 November)	3	Raffaele Dell'Erba	"Se stiamo insieme"	✔	✔	✔	✔
Episode 1 (14 November)	4	Renzo Dell'Erba	"Tre settimane da raccontare"	✔	✔	–	–
Episode 1 (14 November)	5	Anthony Jaffa	"Shake a Tail Feather"	✔	✔	✔	–
Episode 1 (14 November)	6	Alessandra Aldrelli	"America"	✔	✔	✔	✔
Episode 1 (14 November)	7	Ottavio Nuzzolese	"Futura"	–	🟢	–	–
Episode 1 (14 November)	8	Tiziano Cavaliere	"I Shot the Sheriff"	✔	✔	✔	✔
Episode 1 (14 November)	9	Giancarlo Del Vecchio	"Through the Barricades"	✔	✔	✔	✔
Episode 1 (14 November)	10	Felicita Farina	"La pelle nera"	✔	✔	✔	✔
Episode 1 (14 November)	11	Tiziano Cantatore	"Blowin' in the Wind"	–	–	✔	–
Episode 2 (21 November)	1	Franco Rapillo	"Una città per cantare"	✔	✔	✔	✔
Episode 2 (21 November)	2	Carmelo Sciplino	"Fly Me to the Moon"	✔	–	✔	✔
Episode 2 (21 November)	3	Maria Masullo	"E la luna bussò"	✔	✔	✔	✔
Episode 2 (21 November)	4	Jacqueline Schweitzer	"Milord"	✔	✔	✔	–
Episode 2 (21 November)	5	Paola Conte	"Io domani"	–	✔	–	✔
Episode 2 (21 November)	6	Cosimo Ventruti	"Can't Help Falling in Love"	✔	✔	✔	✔
Episode 2 (21 November)	7	Giovanna Russo	"Insieme"	–	✔	✔	✘
Episode 2 (21 November)	8	Giovanni Cannarozzo	"Nun è peccato"	–	–	–	–
Episode 2 (21 November)	9	Roberta Cavalli & Pasquale Di Monte	"Storie brevi"	–	✔	✔	–
Episode 2 (21 November)	10	Anna Rossicchi	"L'amore si odia"	–	✔	–	✔
Episode 2 (21 November)	11	Sergio Gaffurini	"Gelosia"	–	–	🟢	–
Episode 2 (21 November)	12	Glori Sorgato	"Hedonism (Just Because You Feel Good)"	✔	✔	✔	✔
Episode 3 (28 November)	1	Pierluigi Lunedei	"Chissà se lo sai"	✔	✔	✔	✔
Episode 3 (28 November)	2	Paola Troilo	"Nessun dorma"	✔	✔	✔	–
Episode 3 (28 November)	3	Francesco De Siena	"Avrai"	✔	✔	✔	✘
Episode 3 (28 November)	4	Francesca De Fazi	"Ticket to Ride"	✔	✔	✘	✔
Episode 3 (28 November)	5	Giuseppe Nucci	"La nuova stella di Broadway"	✔	✔	–	–
Episode 3 (28 November)	6	Mauro Cianciabella	"Relax"	✔	✔	✔	✘
Episode 3 (28 November)	7	Nancy Cuomo	"Città vuota"	–	✔	–	✔
Episode 3 (28 November)	8	Sergio Gaffurini	"Io che non vivo (senza te)"	–	–	–	–
Episode 3 (28 November)	9	Flora Faja	"Georgia on My Mind"	✔	✔	✔	–
Episode 3 (28 November)	10	Roberto Stafoggia	"Con tutto l'amore che posso"	–	–	–	–
Episode 3 (28 November)	11	Francesca Visentini	"Per Elisa"	✔	✔	✔	✔
Episode 3 (28 November)	12	Sonia Milan	"Wild World"	✔	✔	✔	✔
Episode 3 (28 November)	13	Maria Marino	"Ci vorrebbe il mare"	–	–	–	–
Episode 3 (28 November)	14	Giuseppe De Rosa	"Fiore di maggio"	✔	✔	–	–
Episode 4 (5 December)	1	Tiziana Rosati	"Maledetta primavera"	✔	✔	✔	✔
Episode 4 (5 December)	2	Anna Maria Facciolà	"(You Make Me Feel Like) A Natural Woman"	✔	✔	✔	✔
Episode 4 (5 December)	3	Elsa Albonico	"Ma mi..."	✔	✔	–	✔
Episode 4 (5 December)	4	James Schiebler	"Raindrops Keep Fallin' on My Head"	–	–	–	–
Episode 4 (5 December)	5	Alessandro Casalini	"Senza parole"	✔	✔	✔	–
Episode 4 (5 December)	6	Franco Romanelli	"Wild Wild West"	✔	–	✔	–
Episode 4 (5 December)	7	Lorena Lovison	"Il cielo in una stanza"	–	–	✔	–
Episode 4 (5 December)	8	Elisabetta La Farina	"Moonlight Shadow"	✔	✔	Team full	–
Episode 4 (5 December)	9	Ottavio Nuzzolese	"Chiamami ancora amore"	Team full	✔	Team full	–
Episode 4 (5 December)	10	Marcello Monti	"Smoke on the Water"	Team full	Team full	Team full	✔

== Knockouts ==
The knockouts, also labelled as the semi-finals, aired on 12 December. In this round, each coach groups his/her artists into two groups of three. Each coach can advance one or two artists to the final phase. At the end of each round, three artists per team advanced to the finals.

Artist won the Knockout and advanced to the Final
Artist lost the Knockout and was eliminated

Episode	Coach	Order	Artist	Song	Result
Episode 5 (12 December)	Nek	1	Francesco De Siena	"La sera dei miracoli"	Advanced
Episode 5 (12 December)	Nek	2	Jacqueline Schweitzer	"Tu sì 'na cosa grande"	Advanced
Episode 5 (12 December)	Nek	3	Mauro Cianciabella	"Don't You (Forget About Me)"	Eliminated
Episode 5 (12 December)	Arisa	4	Giovanna Russo	"L'immensità"	Advanced
Episode 5 (12 December)	Arisa	5	Giuseppe Nucci	"Una carezza in un pugno"	Eliminated
Episode 5 (12 December)	Arisa	6	Anna Rossicchi	"Cinque giorni"	Advanced
Episode 5 (12 December)	Cleme & Rocco	7	Pierluigi Lunedei	"Io vivrò (senza te)"	Advanced
Episode 5 (12 December)	Cleme & Rocco	8	Flora Faja	"Moon River"	Eliminated
Episode 5 (12 December)	Cleme & Rocco	9	Cosimo Ventruti	"La donna del mio amico"	Advanced
Episode 5 (12 December)	Loredana Bertè	10	Maria Masullo	"Donna"	Eliminated
Episode 5 (12 December)	Loredana Bertè	11	Francesca Visentin	"What's Up?"	Advanced
Episode 5 (12 December)	Loredana Bertè	12	Gabriella Vai	"La compagnia"	Advanced
Episode 5 (12 December)	Nek	13	Lorena Lovison	"Mi sei scoppiato dentro il cuore"	Eliminated
Episode 5 (12 December)	Nek	14	Tiziano Cavaliere	"Walking on the Moon"	Advanced
Episode 5 (12 December)	Nek	15	Franco Rapillo	"La costruzione di un amore"	Eliminated
Episode 5 (12 December)	Cleme & Rocco	16	Carmelo Sciplino	"Just the Way You Are"	Advanced
Episode 5 (12 December)	Cleme & Rocco	17	Alessandra Aldrelli	"Amami"	Eliminated
Episode 5 (12 December)	Cleme & Rocco	18	Anthony Jaffa	"What a Wonderful World"	Eliminated
Episode 5 (12 December)	Arisa	19	Tiziana Rosati	"Noi due nel mondo e nell'anima"	Eliminated
Episode 5 (12 December)	Arisa	20	Sonia Milan	"Chiquitita"	Advanced
Episode 5 (12 December)	Arisa	21	Roberta Cavalli e Pasquale Di Monte	"Vattene amore"	Eliminated
Episode 5 (12 December)	Loredana Bertè	22	Marcello Monti	"Take the Long Way Home"	Eliminated
Episode 5 (12 December)	Loredana Bertè	23	Glori Sorgato	"La casa del sole"	Eliminated
Episode 5 (12 December)	Loredana Bertè	24	Francesca De Fazi	"Piece of My Heart"	Advanced

== Final ==
The final was broadcast on 19 December 2025. In the first phase of the final, the twelve talents who reached the final must perform a cover assigned by their coach. At the end of the first phase, only four, from any team, will advance on the second phase of the final. At the end of the second and final phase, the winner of the sixth edition of The Voice Senior was announced.

Following the first round, Loredana Bertè no longer has any artists on her team, marking her third consecutive season without a grand finalist. Francesco De Siena was announced as the winner of the season following all performances, marking Nek's first win as a coach; Nek subsequently became the first coach on The Voice Senior to win on their debut season.

Artist advanced to the Super-Final
Artist was eliminated

Round 1

Order	Coach	Artist	Song	Public Votes
1	Nek	Francesco De Siena	"Era già tutto previsto"	23,39%
2	Loredana Bertè	Gabriella Vai	"A chi"	2,61%
3	Arisa	Anna Rossicchi	"Gli uomini non cambiano"	6,59%
4	Cleme & Rocco	Pierluigi Lunedei	"Stella di mare"	21,72%
5	Loredana Bertè	Francesco Visentin	"Crazy"	6,36%
6	Cleme & Rocco	Cosimo Ventruti	"Meraviglioso"	5,39%
7	Arisa	Giovanna Russo	"Adagio"	12,67%
8	Nek	Tiziano Cavaliere	"Jamming"	4,91%
9	Arisa	Sonia Milan	"Domani è un altro giorno"	3,08%
10	Nek	Jacqueline Schweitzer	"Ne me quitte pas"	1,74%
11	Cleme & Rocco	Carmelo Sciplino	"Quanno piove"	8,80%
12	Loredana Bertè	Francesca De Fazi	"Respect"	2,76%

Round 2

Order	Coach	Artist	Song	Public Votes
1	Cleme & Rocco	Pierluigi Lunedei	"Chissà se lo sai"	29,96%
2	Arisa	Giovanna Russo	"L'immensità"	22,02%
3	Cleme & Rocco	Carmelo Sciplino	"Fly Me to the Moon"	13,26%
4	Nek	Francesco De Siena	"La sera dei miracoli"	34,75%
