= Controvento =

Controvento (Italian for 'Against the Wind') may refer to:

- Against the Wind (2000 film), an Italian drama film by Peter Del Monte
- "Controvento" (song), a 2014 Italian song by Arisa
