= La notte (song) =

Single by Arisa

from the album Amami
- Language: Italian
- Released: 15 February 2012
- Length: 3:55
- Label: Warner Music Italy
- Songwriter: Giuseppe Anastasi
- Producer: Mauro Pagani

Arisa singles chronology
"Il tempo che verrà" (2012)	"La notte" (2012)	"L'amore è un'altra cosa" (2012)

Music video
- "La notte" on YouTube

"La notte" (lit. 'The night') is a song by Italian singer Arisa. It was written by Giuseppe Anastasi and produced by Mauro Pagani.

It was released by Warner Music Italy on 15 February 2012 as the lead single from her third studio album Amami. The song was Arisa's entry for the Sanremo Music Festival 2012, where it placed second in the grand final.

"La notte" topped the FIMI Singles Chart and achieved four platinum certifications in Italy.

== Music video ==
The music video of "La notte" was directed by Gaetano Morbioli and released onto YouTube on 15 February 2012.

== Other versions ==
It was covered in Spanish by Mexican group Sandoval with the title "La noche" (2013). In 2015, it was reimagined with a new arrangement by frontman Mario Sandoval in collaboration with Jenny and the Mexicats.

Brazilian singer Tiê recorded a Portuguese cover titled "A Noite" (2014). Gusttavo Lima reprised the Tiê version in 2024.

== Track listing ==
Digital download
No.	Title	Length
1.	"La notte"	3:55

== Charts ==
Chart performance for "La notte"
Chart (2012)	Peak position
Italy (FIMI)	1
Italy Airplay (EarOne)	2

== Certifications ==
Region	Certification	Certified units/sales
Italy (FIMI)	4× Platinum	120,000^{*}
^{*} Sales figures based on certification alone.
