= Malamorenò =

Studio album by Arisa
- Released: 19 February 2010
- Recorded: 2009–2010
- Genre: Traditional pop
- Label: Warner Music

Arisa chronology
Sincerità (2009)	Malamorenò (2010)	Amami (2012)

Singles from Malamorenò
- 1. "Malamorenò" Released: February 17, 2010; 2. "Pace" Released: April 23, 2010

Malamorenò is the second album by the Italian singer Arisa, released on 19 February 2010. It features the single "Malamorenò".

== Track list ==
No.	Title	Lyrics	Music	Length
1.	"L’inventario di un amore"	Giuseppe Anastasi · Arisa	Anastasi · Arisa	3:40
2.	"Oggi"	Anastasi · Arisa	Anastasi	3:33
3.	"Tornerai"	Anastasi	Anastasi	3:11
4.	"Malamorenò"	Anastasi	Anastasi	3:02
5.	"Pace"	Anastasi	Anastasi	3:48
6.	"Il condominio"	Anastasi · Maurizio Filardo	Anastasi · Giuseppe Mangiaracina · Filardo	3:57
7.	"La gioia di un attimo"	Arisa	Arisa	3:47
8.	"Sai che c’è"	Stefano Galafate · Anastasi · Arisa	Galafate · Anastasi · Arisa	3:08
9.	"Se non ci fossi tu"	Anastasi	Anastasi	3:37
10.	"Scivola veloce"	Anastasi	Anastasi	5:01
11.	"Aria" (iTunes only)	Anastasi	Anastasi	2:44

== Charts ==
Chart (2010)	Peak position
Italian Albums (FIMI)	23
