= Amami (disambiguation) =

The Amami are islands in Kagoshima Prefecture, Japan.

Amami may also refer to:

- Amami Ōshima, the largest island
- Amami, Kagoshima, a city on Amami Ōshima
  - Amami Airport, an airport serving the city
- Amami language
- Amami Station, a railway station in Osaka Prefecture
- Amami (film), a 1993 comedy film starring Moana Pozzi
- Amami (album)

== People ==
- Yūki Amami (天海 祐希; born 1967), Japanese actress
- Amami (あまみ), a pseudonym of Kouji Miura (b. 1995), a Japanese manga artist

== See also ==
- Amami rabbit
- Amami thrush
- Amami tip-nosed frog
- Amami woodcock
