= Per sempre =

Per Sempre (lit. 'Forever') may refer to:

== Music ==
=== Albums ===
- Per sempre (Adriano Celentano album), 2002
- Per sempre, an album by Francesco Benigno, 1997
- Per sempre, an album by Raffaello, 2012
- Per sempre, an album by Lowlow and Sercho, 2013
- Per sempre..., a compilation album by Dalida, 2009
- Per sempre, an album by Giovanni Zarrella, 2022
- Per sempre, an album by Paola & Chiara, 2023

=== Songs ===
- "Per sempre" (Marco Carta song), 2008, from Amici's compilation Ti brucia
- "Per sempre" (Nina Zilli song), 2012
- "Per sempre (For Always)", a song by Anthony Callea
- "Per Sempre Amore", a song by Lolly
- "Per Sempre", a single by Bloom 06 from their album Crash Test 01
- "PER SEMPRE", 2024 song by Artie 5ive, featuring Bresh

== Film ==
- Forever (2003 film) or Per sempre, a film starring Francesca Neri
