= Malamorenò (song) =

Single by Arisa

from the album Malamorenò
- Released: 17 February 2010
- Genre: Pop; swing
- Length: 3:01
- Label: Warner Music
- Songwriter: Giuseppe Anastasi

Arisa singles chronology
"Te lo volevo dire" (2009)	"Malamorenò" (2010)	"Pace" (2010)

"Malamorenò" (a univerbation of ma l'amore no "but not love") is a single by Italian pop singer Arisa, released 17 February 2010 by label Warner Music. It is part of the eponymous album Malamorenò.

"Malamorenò" is a Dixieland swing-styled pop song with a 1930s and 1940s-reminiscent melody talking about love, individualism and the end of the world. At the beginning of the song and about halfway through it there are brief shots of a Series 2 Lancia Appia, a nowadays very rare saloon car from the 1950s. The song was generally well received by the media in Italy, who praised its light and catchy melody alongside a more serious message. The song was first performed at the 60th edition of the Festival di Sanremo in 2010. It was a commercial success in Italy, peaking within the top ten at number four and being certified Platinum for downloads exceeding 30,000 copies; it also entered Swiss charts, reaching 61.

== Charts ==
Chart (2010)	Peak Position
Italian FIMI Singles Chart	4
Italy Airplay (EarOne)	44
Swiss Music Charts	61
