= Meraviglioso amore mio =

- Official cover

Single by Arisa

from the album Amami Tour
- Language: Italian
- Released: 26 October 2012
- Length: 3:57
- Label: Warner Music Italy
- Songwriter: Giuseppe Anastasi
- Producer: Mauro Pagani

Arisa singles chronology
| "L'amore è un'altra cosa" (2012) | "Meraviglioso amore mio" (2012) | "Controvento" (2014) |

Music video
- "Meraviglioso amore mio" on YouTube

"Meraviglioso amore mio" (lit. 'Wonderful my love') is a song by Italian singer Arisa. It was written by Giuseppe Anastasi and produced by Mauro Pagani. It was released by Warner Music Italy on 26 October 2012 as a single from her live album Amami Tour.

The song was included in the soundtrack of the 2013 film Pazze di me by Fausto Brizzi.

== Music video ==
The music video of "Meraviglioso amore mio" was directed by Gaetano Morbioli and released onto YouTube on 14 November 2012.

== Charts ==
Weekly chart performance for "Meraviglioso amore mio"
| Chart (2012) | Peak position |
|---|---|
| Italy (FIMI) | 15 |

== Certifications ==
| Region | Certification | Certified units/sales |
|---|---|---|
| Italy (FIMI) | Platinum | 30,000^{‡} |
^{‡} Sales+streaming figures based on certification alone.
