= Mi sento bene =

Single by Arisa

from the album Una nuova Rosalba in città
- Released: 6 February 2019
- Genre: Dance-pop
- Length: 3:44
- Label: Sugar Music
- Songwriters: Arisa; Matteo Buzzanca; Lorenzo Vizzini; Alessandra Flora
- Producer: Matteo Buzzanca

Arisa singles chronology
"Vasame" (2017)	"Mi sento bene" (2019)	"Una nuova Rosalba in città" (2019)

Music video
- "Mi sento bene" on YouTube

"Mi sento bene" (lit. 'I feel good') is a song by Italian singer Arisa. It was written by Arisa, Matteo Buzzanca, Lorenzo Vizzini and Alessandra Flora.

It was released by Sugar Music on 6 February 2019 as the lead single from her sixth studio album Una nuova Rosalba in città. The song was Arisa's entry for the Sanremo Music Festival 2019, where it placed eighth in the grand final.

== Music video ==
The music video of "Mi sento bene" was shot in the Brera district in Milan.

== Track listing ==
Digital download
No.	Title	Length
1.	"Mi sento bene"	3:44

== Charts ==
Chart performance for "Mi sento bene"
Chart (2019)	Peak position
Italy (FIMI)	17
Italy Airplay (EarOne)	29
