= Sincerità =

Single by Arisa

from the album Sincerità
- Language: Italian
- Released: 18 February 2009
- Genre: Pop; acoustic
- Length: 3:18
- Label: Warner Music
- Songwriters: Giuseppe Anastasi; Giuseppe Mangiaracina; Maurizio Filardo

Arisa singles chronology
"Sincerità" (2009)	"Io sono" (2009)

Music video
- "Sincerità" on YouTube

"Sincerità" (Italian pronunciation: [sintʃeriˈta]; "Sincerity") is the debut single by the Italian singer Arisa and it was released on 18 February 2009. It placed first in the Newcomers' section and won the 'Mia Martini' Critics Award in the Sanremo Music Festival 2009.

== Charts ==
Chart (2009)	Peak Position
European Hot 100 Singles	83
Italy (FIMI)	1
Italy Airplay (EarOne)	1
Switzerland (Schweizer Hitparade)	61

=== Year-end charts ===
Chart (2009)	Position
Italian Singles Chart	2
