= Marco Carta =

Italian singer (born 1985)

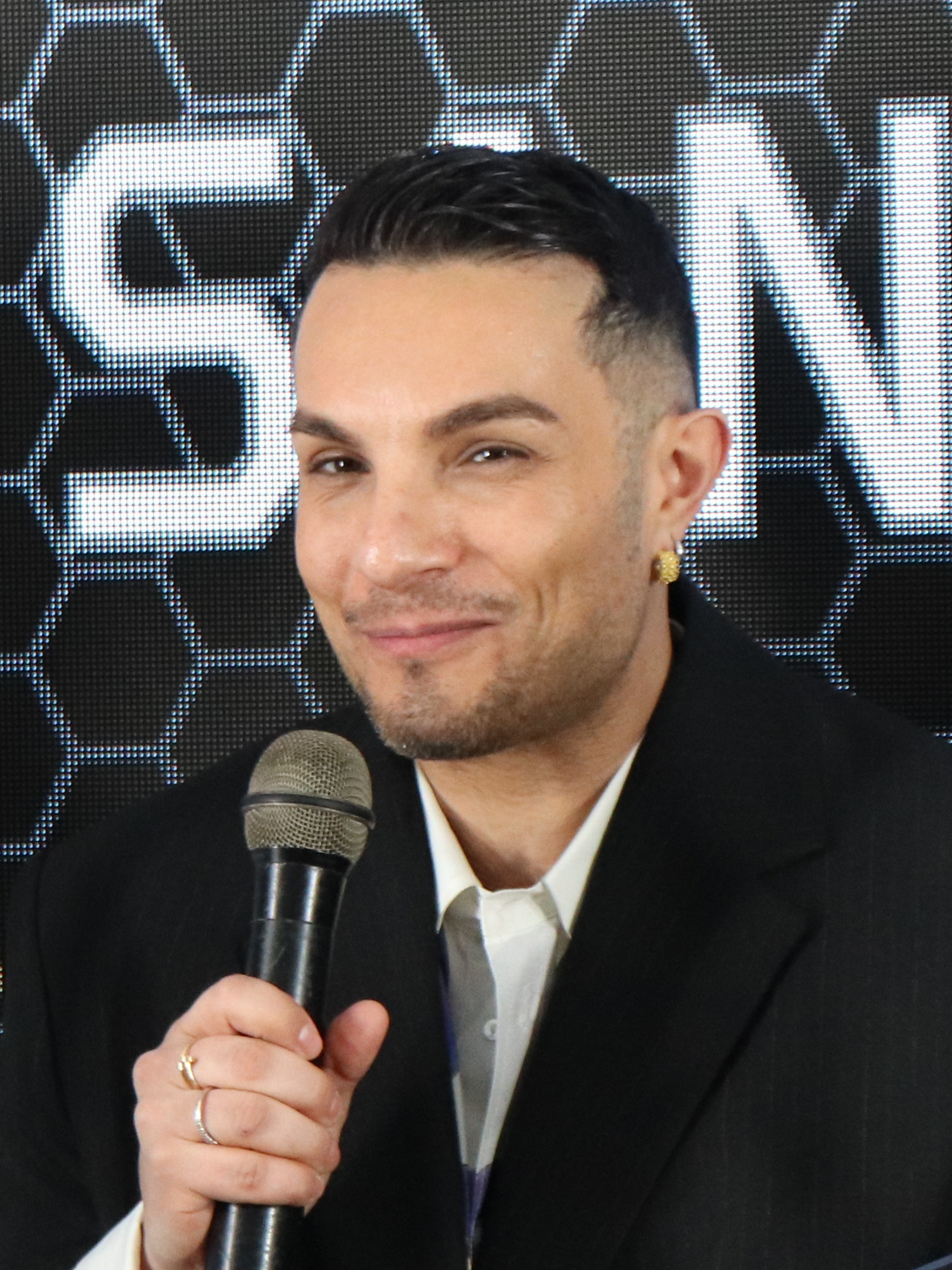
- Marco Carta, 2026

Background information
- Born: 21 May 1985 (age 41)
- Origin: Cagliari, Sardinia, Italy
- Genres: Pop
- Occupations: Singer; television personality
- Years active: 2007–present
- Labels: Warner Music Italy; Warner Music Spain

Marco Carta (born 21 May 1985) is an Italian singer. To date, he has sold more than 245,000 albums and 60,000 singles.

== Biography and career ==
=== Early life and victory to Amici ===
Marco Carta was born in Cagliari, Sardinia, in 1985.

In 2007, he participated as a singer in the talent show Amici di Maria De Filippi. On 16 April 2008, he won the competition with 75% of the public vote, winning €300,000 and a contract with Warner Music Italy. Since winning, he has appeared on many television programs, such as the Wind Music Awards and the Partita del Cuore 2008.

=== Ti rincontrerò and the first successes ===
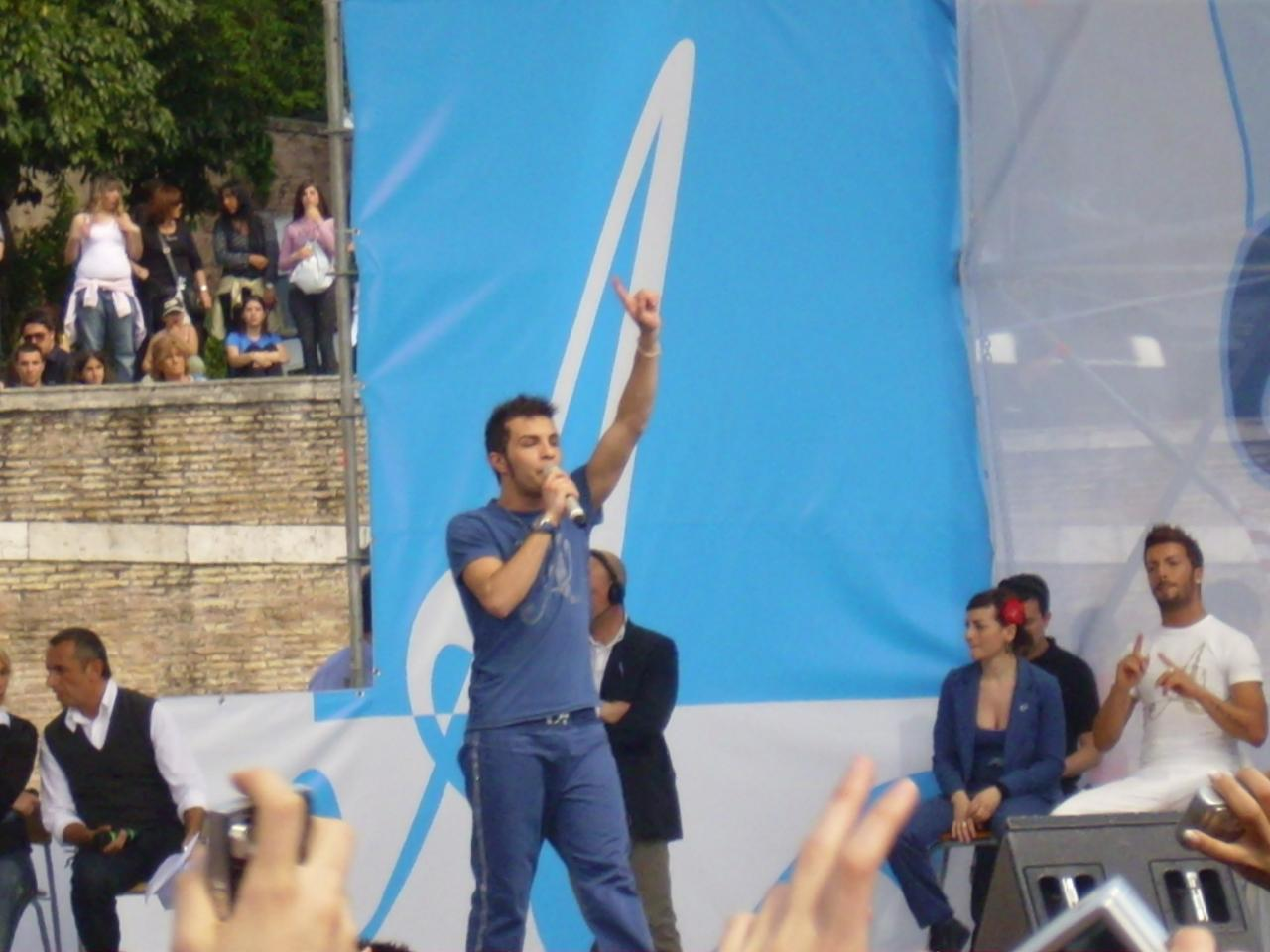
Marco Carta in a concert in Rome.

Marco presented a live preview of his first single "Ti rincontrerò", during the radio program Viva Radio 2 on 6 June 2008. The album of the same name was released on 13 June by Warner Music Italy / Atlantic. It contains 11 tracks, including a duet with Luca Jurman (his vocal coach in the talent show Amici). A week after the launch, the album debuted at third place in the standings FIMI / Nielsen with over 40 thousand copies sold and got the gold disc. Subsequently, in August, the album reached the 70 thousand copies sold mark, achieving platinum status. On 6 September, on MTV's Total Request Live, Carta announced that "Ti rincontrerò" would be launched in Spain, Central America and South America. On 4 July 2008, he began his first tour of Italy, which ended in October, attracting a total of more than 200 thousand visitors . On 31 December 2008, Marco was the star of a New Year's concert in his hometown, to which 70 thousand spectators came. On 3 October 2008, he published an album based on the tour, In concerto, which debuted in twentieth place in sales charts FIMI and Nielsen and after the second week reached tenth place. Marco was also the star of the 2008 Challenge sponsored by MTV, Marco Carta @ Your School: an institution hosted the concert of Messina. On 1 December, during the second edition of the What's Up International Award for Young Talents, he was awarded the prize Best Young Talent 2008 (Best Male Vocalist). He joined the animated film Impy superstar – Mission Luna Park as voice and interpreter of the cover That's the Way (I Like It) inserted in the soundtrack.

=== The victory at the Sanremo Music Festival and La forza mia ===
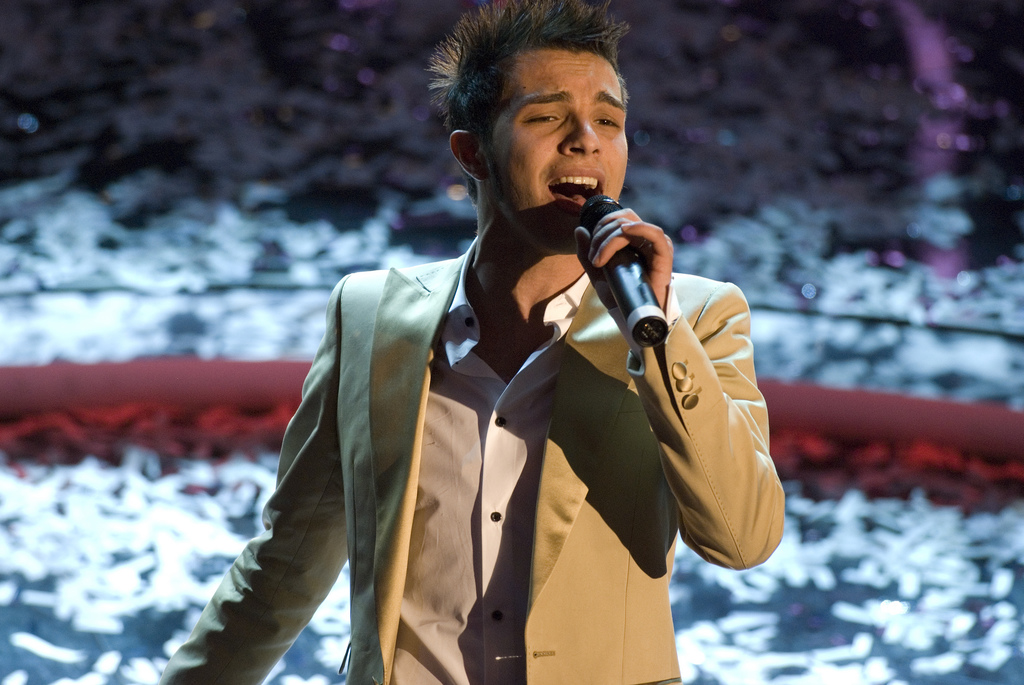
Marco Carta on the stage of the Festival di Sanremo 2009.

On 21 February 2009, he won the 59th Sanremo Festival in the category Artists with the song "La forza mia" written by Paolo Carta, the producer, songwriter and guitarist of Laura Pausini, winning 57.62% of the preference votes of the public On 20 February, he published and released his third album, La forza mia. Just four days after release, La forza mia wins platinum status with over 80 thousand copies sold. and debuted in third place in FIMI. Two weeks after release, the album moves from third to second position in the leader FIMI. His second single, "Dentro ad ogni brivido", was released in April 2009. On 16 May, Carta won the awards Man of the Year and Best No. 1 of the year, in TRL Awards 2009. The "Marco Carta Tour 2009", which started on 30 April, had a great success with the public, to the point that some dates were canceled for being overcrowded. That same year, Carta wins two Wind Music Award for discs of platinum albums achieved with Ti rincontrerò and La forza mia, plus a special prize (RTL 102.5), the Sirmione Catullo 2009 prize as the revelation of the year, and then the Venice Music Awards 2009 as the best artist of the year. On 16 September, after 5 months, the summer tour ends and on 26 September, his song "Dentro ad ogni brivido" is voted as the most representative song of summer 2009 as the MTV Coca-Cola The Summer Song.

=== Il cuore muove and Necessità lunatica ===
Preceded by the hit "Quello che dai", on 25 May 2010 Il cuore muove is released. Carta in an interview declared: "It's a work made over many months. I wanted to choose my own tracks step by step to better understand how good they were."

From the album, which reached second place on the Italian charts, came the single "Niente più di me".

In 2011 Il cuore muove went gold and the artist was a winner in the Wind Music Awards.

Preceded by the hit "Mi hai guardato per caso", Necessità lunatica is released on 10 April 2012.

From the album, which reached number 2 in the Italian chart, the single, and title-track, "Necessità lunatica" was released (7 September 2012).

In September 2012 Marco Carta recorded his first single in Spanish, thanks to the agreement with Warner Music Spain: this is the Spanish version of "Mi hai guardato per caso", entitled "Casualmente miraste" and published simultaneously on 21 September in Spain, Mexico, Argentina, Chile and Italy. In November 2012 the singles "Mi hai guardato per caso" and "Necessità lunatica" are certified gold disc for sales of over 15.000 digital. On 18 January 2013 released the third single "Scelgo me", from the album Necessità lunatica.

In 2017, he won Tale e quale show on Rai 1, the Italian adaptation of Your Face Sounds Familiar.

== Music ==
In 2008, he released his debut single, "Per sempre". The single did fairly well in Italy and peaked at No. 44 on the Italian FIMI chart and No. 18 on the Italian iTunes chart. The single was included in the album Ti Brucia, also released in 2008, with songs by him and other contestants of the TV show Amici di Maria de Filippi.

His debut album Ti rincontrerò was released on 13 June 2008 and debuted No. 3 on the Italian charts. It sold over 40,000 copies during the first week. Current data shows that the album has sold about 70,000 copies, in order to sell 100,000 . In concerto is his first live CD/DVD and was released on 3 October 2008.

He won the Festival of Sanremo in the month of February 2009 with the single "La forza mia". The album La forza mia sold 70,000 copies in Italy in just one week, reaching platinum status. Currently, the album has sold about 100,000 copies in Italy.

On 25 May 2010, he released his third studio album II cuore muove. The album sold about 30.000 copies and has been certified gold.

On 10 April 2012, he released his fourth studio album Necessità lunatica.

== Discography ==
=== Studio albums ===
Year	Album	Peak chart positions		Sales	Certification
Year	Album	ITA	SWI	Sales	Certification
2008	Ti rincontrerò: Released: 13 June 2008; Label: Warner	3	—	100,000+	Platinum
2009	La forza mia: Released: 20 February 2009; Label: Warner	3	62	100,000+	Platinum
2010	Il cuore muove: Released: 25 May 2010; Label: Warner	2	—	30,000+	Gold
2012	Necessità lunatica: Released: 10 April 2012; Label: Warner	2	—	—	—
2016	Come il mondo: Released: 27 May 2016; Label: Warner	5	—	—	—
2017	Tieniti forte: Released: 26 May 2017; Label: Atlantic	5	—	—	—
Il simbolo "—" indica che l'album non è entrato in classifica in quel Paese.

=== Live album ===
Year	Album	Peak chart positions
Year	Album	ITA
2008	In concerto: Released: 3 October 2008; Label: Warner	10

=== Extended play ===
Year	EP	Peak chart positions
Year	EP	ITA
2014	Merry Christmas: Released: 27 November 2014; Label: Warner	13

=== Singles ===
Year	Title	Peak chart positions	Album
Year	Title	ITA	Album
2008	"Per sempre"	—	Ti rincontrerò
2008	"Ti rincontrerò"	11	Ti rincontrerò
2009	"Anima di nuvola"	—	Ti rincontrerò
2009	"Un grande libro nuovo"	—	Ti rincontrerò
2009	"La forza mia"	2	La forza mia
2009	"Dentro ad ogni brivido"	7	La forza mia
2009	"Resto dell'idea"	6	La forza mia
2009	"Imagine"	13	Non-album single
2010	"Quello che dai"	1	Il cuore muove
2010	"Niente più di me"	15	Il cuore muove
2012	"Mi hai guardato per caso"	6	Necessità lunatica
2012	"Necessità lunatica"	4	Necessità lunatica
2013	"Scelgo me"	10	Non-album singles
2013	"Ti voglio bene"	10	Non-album singles
2013	"Fammi entrare"	9	Non-album singles
2017	"Il meglio sta arrivando"	47	Non-album singles

== Awards and nominations ==
- 2008
  - First place of the seventh edition of the talent show Amici di Maria De Filippi
  - Platinum disc with the album Ti rincontrerò
  - Golden disc with the album In concerto
  - International Award What's Up Young Talents as best debuting voice
  - Soundsblog Award 2008 as the most voted artist from the Web's fans.
- 2009
  - First place of the cinquantanovesima edizione of Festival di Sanremo.
  - Platinum disc with the album La forza mia
  - Wind music Award how Platinum Album for La forza mia e Ti rincontrerò
  - Plate of the Mayor and the Municipal School of Music in Cagliari, certifying "Distinguished Citizen"
  - Award TRL Awards 2009 as Uomo dell'anno (Man of the year)
  - Award TRL Awards 2009 as Miglior No. 1 dell'anno (Best No. 1 of the year) per il singolo La forza mia
  - Special Award "RTL 102.5" in Wind Music Awards 2009 as being the most voted artist in the radio's website
  - Double Award Wind Music Awards 2009 for the Platinum albums, obtained in the last year with the albums Ti rincontrerò and La forza mia
  - Award Sirmione Catullo 2009 as revelation of the year
  - Award Venice Music Awards 2009 as Best Artist of the year
  - Award MTV Coca-Cola The Summer Song 2009 – First classified with the single "Dentro ad ogni brivido"
- 2011
  - Award TRL Awards 2011 as Best talent show artist.
  - Golden disc with the album Il cuore muove
  - Wind Music Award how Gold album for Il cuore muove
- 2012
  - Nickelodeon Kids' Choice Award as Best italian singer.
  - Baroque Prize – "Land of the Sun Award"
