= La forza mia =

Single by Marco Carta

from the album La forza mia
- Released: 18 February 2009
- Genre: Pop
- Length: 3:45
- Label: Warner
- Songwriter: Paolo Carta
- Producer: Paolo Carta

Marco Carta singles chronology
"Un grande libro nuovo" (2008)	"La forza mia" (2009)	"Dietro ad ogni brivido" (2009)

Music video
- "La forza mia" on YouTube

"La forza mia" (transl. The strength of mine) is a 2009 song by Italian singer-songwriter Marco Carta, and written and produced by Paolo Carta. It was released on 18 February 2009 as the lead single of the album with the same name.

The song won the 59th edition of the Sanremo Music Festival.

== Music video ==
The official music video for "La forza mia", directed by Gaetano Morbioli, was shot in London and released on the same day of the single.

== Charts ==
=== Weekly charts ===
Weekly chart performance for "La forza mia"
Chart (2009)	Peak position
Italy (FIMI)	2

=== Year-end charts ===
Year-end chart performance for "La forza mia"
Chart (2009)	Position
Italy (FIMI)	11
