= Nancy Cuomo =

Italian singer (born 1946)

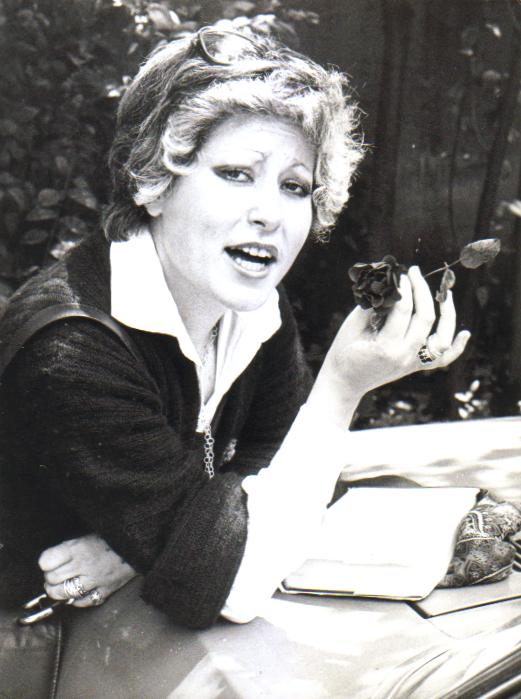
- Cuomo in 1972

Background information
- Born: Maria Cuomo; 9 May 1946 (age 79); Piedimonte d'Alife, Caserta, Italy
- Origin: Rome, Italy
- Genres: Pop
- Occupations: Singer; songwriter; producer
- Years active: 1964–present

Maria Cuomo (born 9 May 1946), best known as Nancy Cuomo, is an Italian singer, songwriter and producer.

== Life and career ==
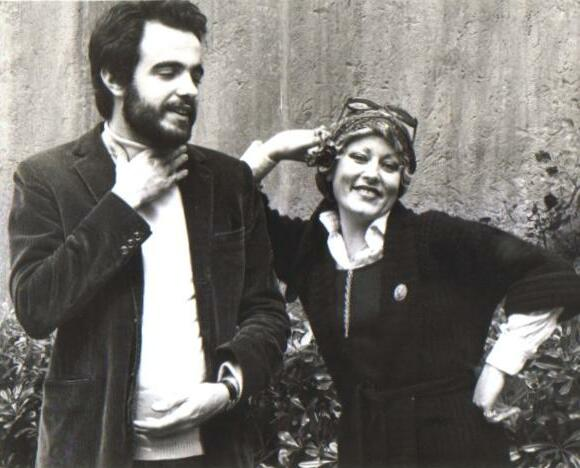
Cuomo with composer Manuel De Sica, 1974

Born in Piedimonte d'Alife (now called Piedimonte Matese), in the Province of Caserta, Campania, Cuomo started performing in a beat band, mainly active in local festivals and in music halls of Caserta. After recording her first singles with the label KappaO, in the mid-1960s she moved to Rome, where she was scriptured by the club Kilt.

Noticed by Nico Fidenco, Cuomo was offered to perform "Love Love Bang Bang", theme song of the film Kiss Kiss...Bang Bang. In 1968, she was put under contract by Fonit Cetra. During her career, Cuomo took part in Cantagiro, in some episodes of Settevoci and in several high-profile television programs. In 1973, she married and significantly slowed her activities.

In November 2025, she took part in the sixth season of The Voice Senior, passing the blind audition stage with a performance of "Città vuota" and joining Loredana Bertè's team. However, she did not reach the semi-final.

== Discography ==
- Il Juke Box (KappaO) – 1965
- Sanremo '66 (KappaO) – 1966
- Stereo Cinema Parade (Parade) – 1967
- Cantagiro '68 (CGD) – 1968
- Viaggio nell'amore (Erre) – 1974
- L'amore è una cosa meravigliosa (Erre) – 1975
- Prendimi, tienimi (Hilton Record) – 1980
- E nisciuno vo' sentì (Nancy Cuomo Music) – 1996
- Parlami ancora (Nancy Cuomo Music) – 1999
- Canti del cielo (Nancy Cuomo Music) – 2000
- Cine Jazz (GDM Music) – 2005
- The Spy Movie Collection (Verita Note) – 2006
- Movie Songs Book (Gemelli) – 2009
- Aria di Roma (La Semicroma Label) –2009
