= The Voice Senior (Italian TV series) season 7 =

The Voice Senior
- Season 7
- Promotional poster featuring coaches (clockwise from left) Mannoia, Hunt & Clementino, Arisa, and Nek
- Presented by: Antonella Clerici
- Coaches: Clementino & Rocco Hunt; Fiorella Mannoia; Arisa; Nek
- Winner: Giovanni Scribano
- Winning coach: Arisa
- Runner-up: Cristina Orsi

Release
- Original network: Rai 1
- Original release: 9 October – 13 November 2026

Season chronology
- ← Previous; Season 6

The seventh season of the Italian singing competition The Voice Senior began airing on 9 October 2026, on Rai 1. Arisa, Clementino & Rocco Hunt, and Nek returned as coaches from the previous season. Meanwhile, Fiorella Mannoia debuted as a coach this season, replacing Loredana Bertè. Following Bertè's departure, Clementino serves as the last coach remaining since the inception of the show.

Giovanni Scribano was named the winner of the season with 48,13% of the public vote, marking Arisa's first win as a coach across all of her combined seasons as a coach on The Voice Senior, The Voice Kids, and The Voice Generations. Additionally, following Scribano's win Arisa also became the third female coach to win The Voice of Italy (including Kids, Senior, and Generations), following Dolcenera and Berté.

== Coaches ==
The Voice Senior season 7 coaches

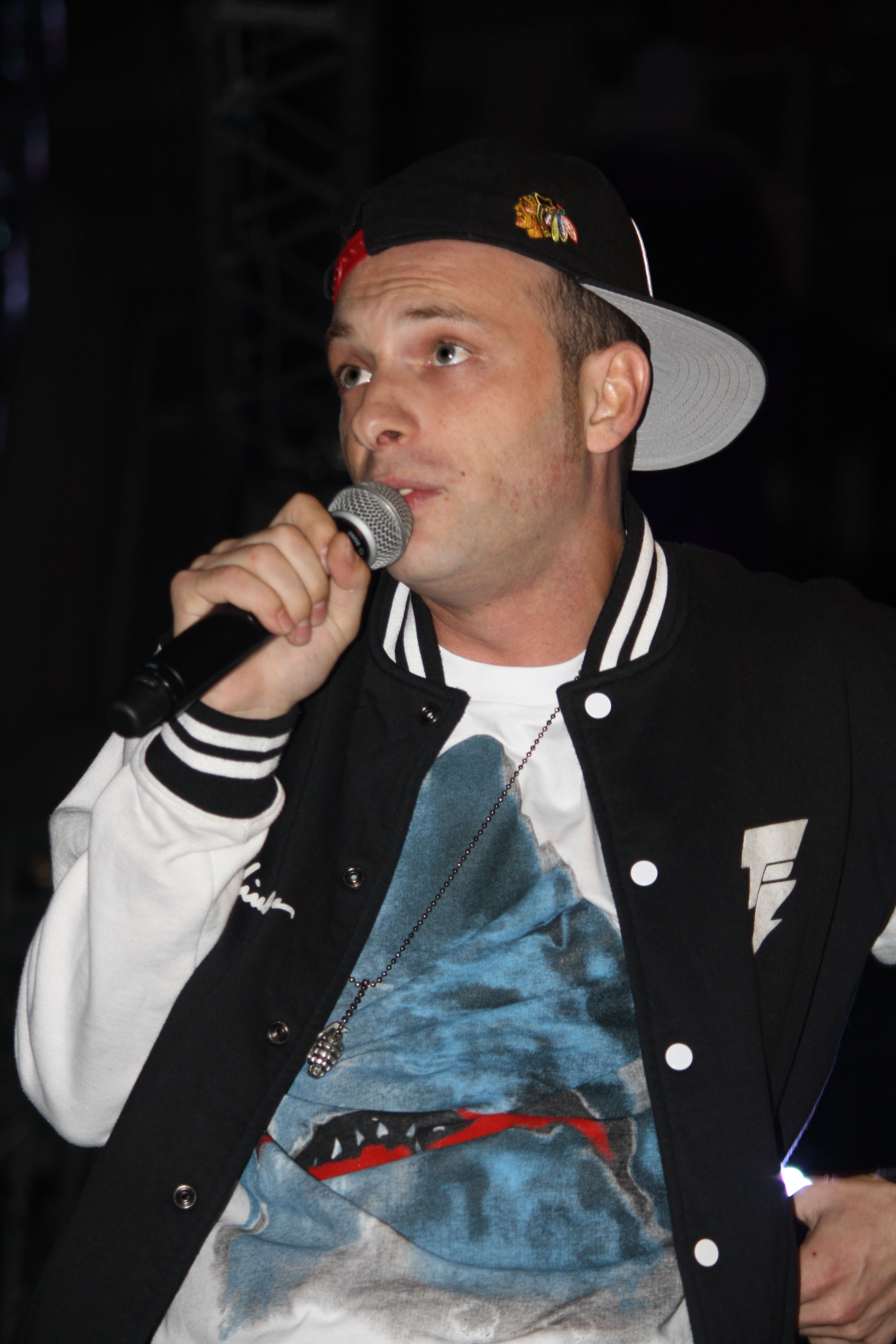
Clementino (duo)

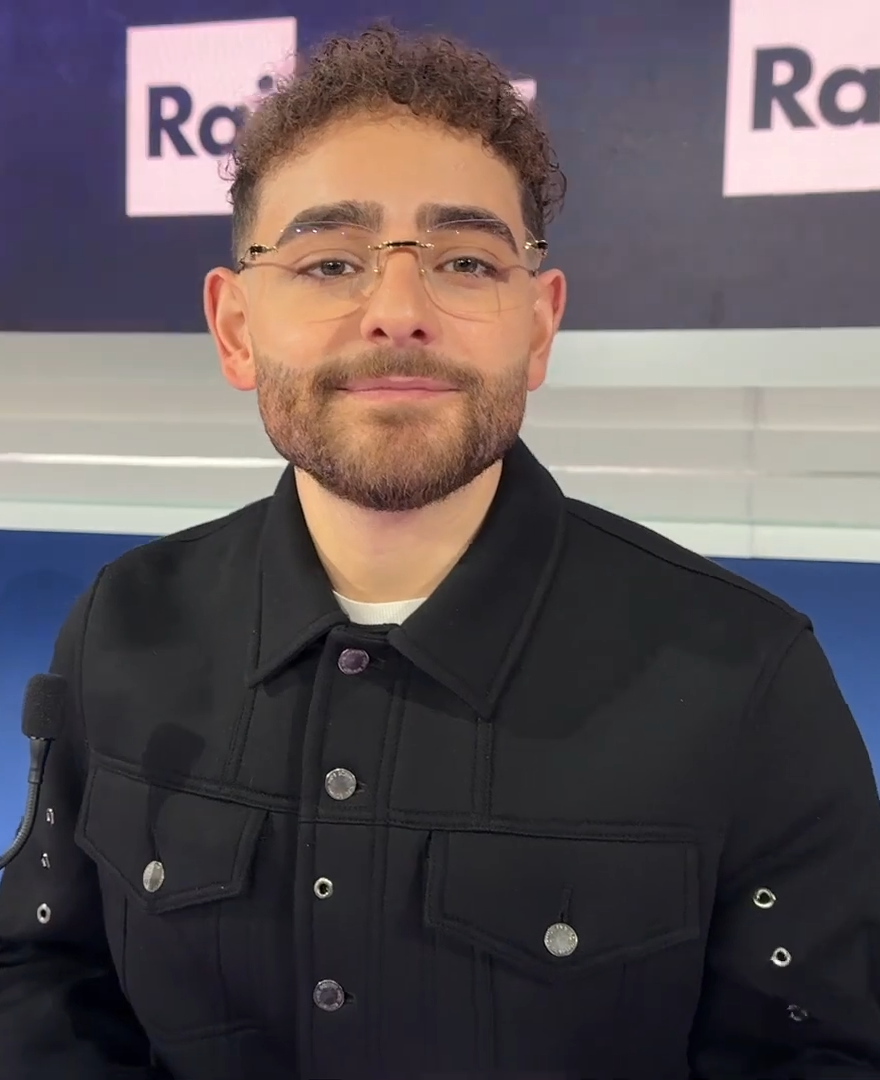
Rocco Hunt (duo)

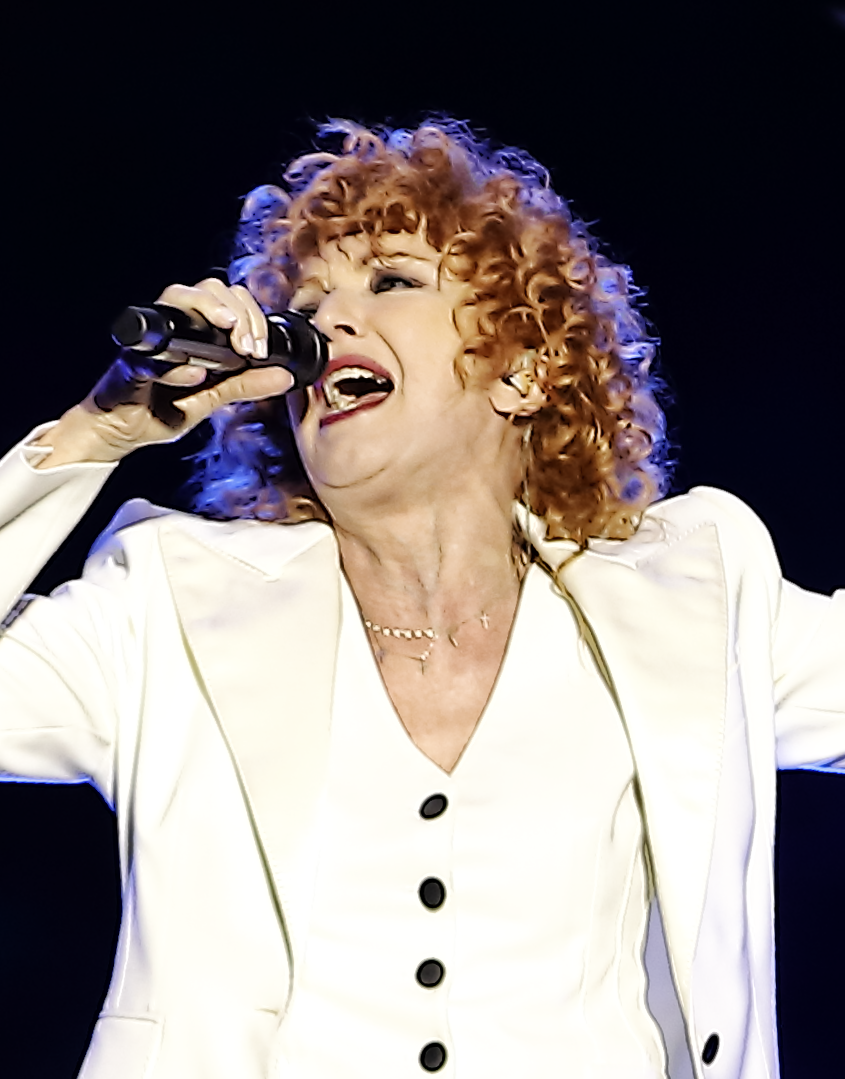
Fiorella Mannoia

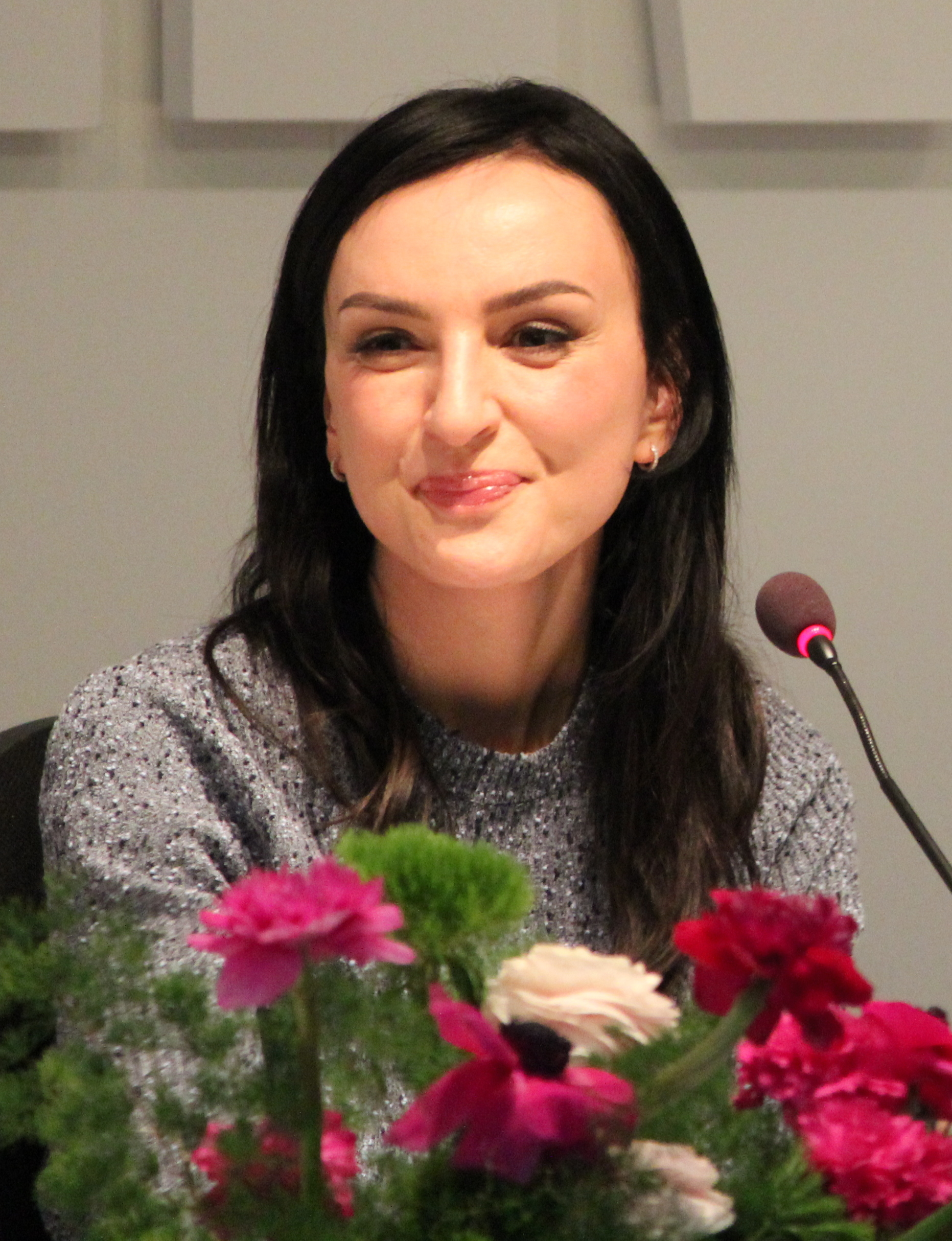
Arisa

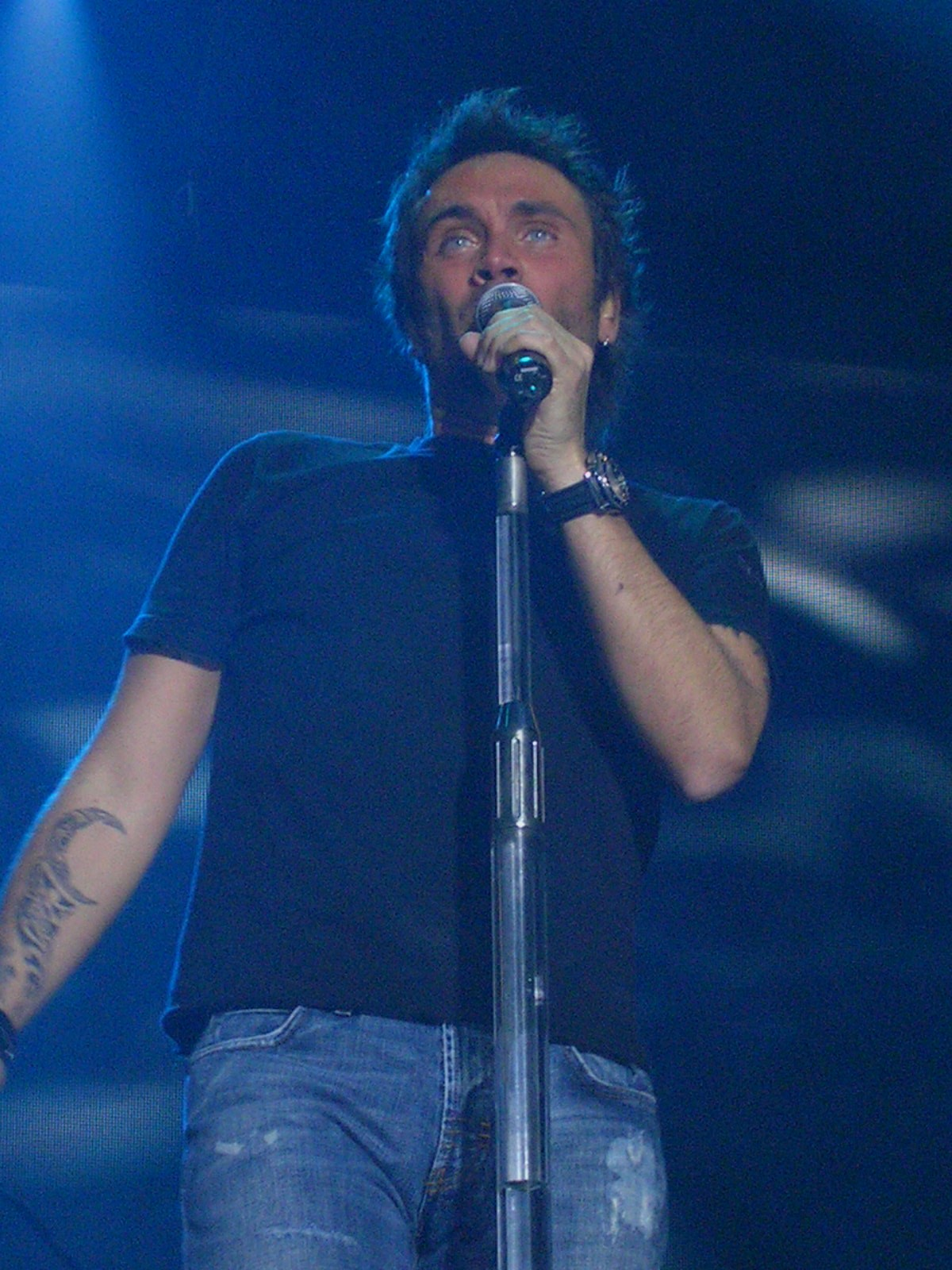
Nek

Following the conclusion of the sixth season in late 2025, Rai 1 announced that The Voice Senior would return for its seventh season. After, it was confirmed that Arisa, Clementino & Rocco Hunt, and Nek would all return as coaches from the previous season. Loredana Bertè exited the panel this season, having previously served as a coach since the show's inception. Fiorella Mannoia was announced as her replacement for the season.

== Teams ==
- Winner
- Runner-up
- Third place
- Fourth place
- Eliminated in the Final
- Eliminated in the Knockouts
- Eliminated in the Cut

Coaches	Top 40 Artists				
Clementino & Rocco Hunt					
Clementino & Rocco Hunt	Giulia Maglione	Giosuè Tortorelli	Rosella Vespignani	Carlo Lena	Pasquale Mongo
Clementino & Rocco Hunt	Pasquale Pizzo	Roberto Albanese	Rubina Cecere	Bianka De Fazi	Luisa Toscano
Fiorella Mannoia					
Fiorella Mannoia	Anna Cuomo	Sabrina Brodosi	Fabiana Fraioli	Ivano Calcagno	Natalino Colacci
Fiorella Mannoia	Claudio Sanfilippo	Mirco Botta	Patricia Carlini	Anna Maria Dilevrano	Guglielmo Ferrari
Arisa					
Arisa	Giovanni Scribano	Chantal Guerlement	Francesca Magnelli	Lucia Buci	Clizia Luisi
Arisa	Lucia Tucci	Sonia de la Caridad Perez	Claudio Fiumara	Anna Maria Mandrini	Renzo Levi Minzi
Nek					
Nek	Cristina Orsi	Paolo Falchi	Vittorio Gasso	Federico Aicardi	Pasqualino Costantini
Nek	Silvia Grassi	Beppe Dettori	Daniele Facci	Cinzia Trucco	Valerio Valenti

== Blind auditions ==
The blind auditions premiered on 9 October 2026. Each coach must have ten artists on their team at the end of the blind auditions. Each coach is given one "block" to use in the entire blind auditions, and a "Second Chance" button which allows them to press the button for an artist that failed to make a team after his/her audition. The artist then auditions a second time with the goal of advancing. At the end of the blind auditions, Fiorella Mannoia did not use her block and only Nek used his "Second Chance" button.

Blind auditions color key
✔	Coach pressed "I WANT YOU" button
	Artist defaulted to a coach's team
	Artist elected this coach's team
	Artist eliminated as no coach pressing their button
	The artist was selected for a team in the blind auditions, but was not chosen by his coach to advance to the knockouts.
🟢	Coach pressed the "Second Chance" button after artist was previously eliminated
✘	Coach pressed "I WANT YOU" button, but was blocked by Cleme & Rocco
✘	Coach pressed "I WANT YOU" button, but was blocked by Fiorella
✘	Coach pressed "I WANT YOU" button, but was blocked by Arisa
✘	Coach pressed "I WANT YOU" button, but was blocked by Nek

Blind auditions results
Episode	Order	Artist	Song	Coaches' and artist's choices			
Episode	Order	Artist	Song	Cleme & Rocco	Fiorella	Arisa	Nek
Episode 1 (9 October)	1	Sabrina Brodosi	"Miserere"	✔	✔	✔	✔
Episode 1 (9 October)	2	Natalino Colacci	"Angelo"	✔	✔	✔	✔
Episode 1 (9 October)	3	Pasquale Mongo	"Let the Music Play"	✔	✔	✔	✔
Episode 1 (9 October)	4	Anna Maria Dilevrano	"Quello che le donne non dicono"	✔	✔	–	–
Episode 1 (9 October)	5	Antonio Pecorelli	"Quizás, Quizás, Quizás"	–	–	–	–
Episode 1 (9 October)	6	Giulia Maglione	"Cu'mme"	✔	✘	✔	✔
Episode 1 (9 October)	7	Clizia Aloisi	"I Don't Know How to Love Him"	✔	–	✔	✔
Episode 1 (9 October)	8	Luisa Toscano	"Dedicato"	✔	✔	✔	✔
Episode 1 (9 October)	9	Federico Aicardi	"L'anno che verrà"	–	–	–	🟢
Episode 1 (9 October)	10	Paolo Falchi	"Everytime You Go Away"	✔	✔	✔	✔
Episode 2 (16 October)	1	Rosella Vespignani	"L'importante è finire"	✔	✔	✔	✔
Episode 2 (16 October)	2	Patricia Carlini	"C'era un ragazzo che come me amava i Beatles e i Rolling Stones"	✔	✔	✔	✔
Episode 2 (16 October)	3	Valerio Valenti	"T'innamorerai"	✔	–	✔	✔
Episode 2 (16 October)	4	Cinzia Trucco	"Accidenti a te"	–	–	✔	✔
Episode 2 (16 October)	5	Ivano Calcagno	"Il cielo in una stanza"	✔	✔	✔	–
Episode 2 (16 October)	6	Vittorio Gasso	"Lo chiamavano Trinità..."	✔	✔	✔	✔
Episode 2 (16 October)	7	Claudio Fiumara	"Se io, se lei"	–	✔	✔	–
Episode 2 (16 October)	8	Cristina Orsi	"Why"	✔	✔	✔	✔
Episode 2 (16 October)	9	Francesca Magnelli	"La fine"	✔	✔	✔	–
Episode 2 (16 October)	10	Luca Sandri	"Torpedo blu"	–	–	–	–
Episode 2 (16 October)	11	Bianka De Fazi	"Come Together"	✔	✔	✔	✔
Episode 3 (23 October)	1	Anna Cuomo	"Brivido caldo"	✔	✔	–	–
Episode 3 (23 October)	2	Pasqualino Costantini	"L'acrobata"	✔	✔	✔	✔
Episode 3 (23 October)	3	Claudio Sanfilippo	"Ti ricordo ancora"	–	✔	✔	✔
Episode 3 (23 October)	4	Rubina Cecere	"Per sempre sì"	✔	✔	✔	–
Episode 3 (23 October)	5	Beppe Dettori	"Spunta la luna dal monte"	✔	✔	✔	✔
Episode 3 (23 October)	6	Anna Maria Mandrini	"Lady Marmalade"	✘	✔	✔	✔
Episode 3 (23 October)	7	Mirco Botta	"Che fantastica storia è la vita"	–	✔	–	–
Episode 3 (23 October)	8	Renzo Levi Minzi	"Come il sole all'improvviso/Una ragione per vivere"	✔	–	✔	–
Episode 3 (23 October)	9	Lucia Tucci	"Non ti scordar mai di me"	–	–	✔	–
Episode 3 (23 October)	10	Lucia Bui	"Un sorriso dentro al pianto"	✔	–	✔	–
Episode 3 (23 October)	11	Pasquale Pizzo	"What a Wonderful World"	✔	✔	✘	✔
Episode 3 (23 October)	12	Cinzia Baccini	"Minuetto"	–	–	–	–
Episode 3 (23 October)	13	Chantal Guerlement	"Et moi dans mon coin"	–	–	✔	–
Episode 4 (30 October)	1	Daniele Facci	"Il mare calmo della sera"	✔	–	✔	✔
Episode 4 (30 October)	2	Guglielmo Ferrari	"Feel"	✔	✔	✔	–
Episode 4 (30 October)	3	Silvia Grassi	"Domani è un altro giorno"	–	–	✔	✔
Episode 4 (30 October)	4	Carlo Lena	"Comme d'habitude"	✔	–	✔	–
Episode 4 (30 October)	5	Maria Sole Bandini	"Torn"	–	–	–	–
Episode 4 (30 October)	6	Roberto Albanese	"Sotto il segno dei pesci"	✔	–	✔	–
Episode 4 (30 October)	7	Fabiana Fraioli	"Sei nell'anima"	✔	✔	✔	✔
Episode 4 (30 October)	8	Giovanni Scribano	"Più su"	✔	Team full	✔	–
Episode 4 (30 October)	9	Sonia de la Caridad Perez	"Amado Mio"	–	Team full	✔	–
Episode 4 (30 October)	10	Federico Aicardi	"Sempre e per sempre"	✔	Team full	Team full	✔
Episode 4 (30 October)	11	Giosuè Tortorelli	"Il rock di Capitan Uncino"	✔	Team full	Team full	Team full

== Knockouts ==
The knockouts, also labelled as the semi-finals, aired on 6 November 2026. In this round, each coach groups his/her artists into two groups of three. Each coach can advance one or two artists to the final phase. At the end of each round, three artists per team advanced to the finals.

Artist won the Knockout and advanced to the Final
Artist lost the Knockout and was eliminated

Episode	Coach	Order	Artist	Song	Result
Episode 5 (6 November)	Fiorella Mannoia	1	Fabiana Fraioli	"Briciole"	Advanced
Episode 5 (6 November)	Fiorella Mannoia	2	Sabrina Brodosi	"All by Myself"	Advanced
Episode 5 (6 November)	Fiorella Mannoia	3	Natalino Colacci	"Uomini soli"	Eliminated
Episode 5 (6 November)	Nek	4	Paolo Falchi	"Chiedi chi erano i Beatles"	Advanced
Episode 5 (6 November)	Nek	5	Vittorio Gasso	"Oh, Pretty Woman"	Advanced
Episode 5 (6 November)	Nek	6	Silvia Grassi	"...E dimmi che non vuoi morire"	Eliminated
Episode 5 (6 November)	Arisa	7	Giovanni Scribano	"Questo piccolo grande amore"	Advanced
Episode 5 (6 November)	Arisa	8	Clizia Aloisi	"Wuthering Heights"	Eliminated
Episode 5 (6 November)	Arisa	9	Lucia Bui	"Senza pietà"	Eliminated
Episode 5 (6 November)	Cleme & Rocco	10	Rosella Vespignani	"Io canto"	Advanced
Episode 5 (6 November)	Cleme & Rocco	11	Giosuè Tortorelli	"Pride (In the Name of Love)"	Advanced
Episode 5 (6 November)	Cleme & Rocco	12	Pasquale Pizzo	"Non abbiam bisogno di parole"	Eliminated
Episode 5 (6 November)	Fiorella Mannoia	13	Ivano Calcagno	"Lontano, lontano"	Eliminated
Episode 5 (6 November)	Fiorella Mannoia	14	Anna Cuomo	"Someone like You"	Advanced
Episode 5 (6 November)	Fiorella Mannoia	15	Claudio Sanfilippo	"Vita"	Eliminated
Episode 5 (6 November)	Nek	16	Pasqualino Costantini	"Poetica"	Eliminated
Episode 5 (6 November)	Nek	17	Cristina Orsi	"I'm Outta Love"	Advanced
Episode 5 (6 November)	Nek	18	Federico Aicardi	"La verità"	Eliminated
Episode 5 (6 November)	Arisa	19	Francesca Magnelli	"Nei giardini che nessuno sa"	Advanced
Episode 5 (6 November)	Arisa	20	Lucia Tucci	"Ma che freddo fa"	Eliminated
Episode 5 (6 November)	Arisa	21	Chantal Guerlement	"Histoire d'un amour"	Advanced
Episode 5 (6 November)	Cleme & Rocco	22	Pasquale Mongo	"Prendila così"	Eliminated
Episode 5 (6 November)	Cleme & Rocco	23	Giulia Maglione	"Anna verrà"	Advanced
Episode 5 (6 November)	Cleme & Rocco	24	Carlo Lena	"Reginella"	Eliminated

== Final ==
The final was broadcast on 13 November 2026. In the first phase of the final, the twelve talents who reached the final must perform a cover assigned by their coach. At the end of the first phase, only four, from any team, advanced the second phase of the final. At the end of the second and final phase, the winner of the seventh edition of The Voice Senior was announced.

Following the first round, Clementino & Rocco Hunt no longer had any artists on their team. Giovanni Scribano was announced as the winner of the season following all performances, marking Arisa's first win as a coach.

Artist advanced to the Super-Final
Artist was eliminated

Round 1

Order	Coach	Artist	Song	Public Votes
1	Fiorella Mannoia	Sabrina Brodosi	"Grande amore"	11,13%
2	Nek	Paolo Falchi	"All Night Long (All Night)"	4,75%
3	Arisa	Giovanni Scribano	"Ricordati di me"	25,57%
4	Fiorella Mannoia	Anna Cuomo	"I Will Always Love You"	9,41%
5	Cleme & Rocco	Rosella Vespignani	"Sono come tu mi vuoi"	6,96%
6	Nek	Cristina Orsi	"Think"	10,45%
7	Cleme & Rocco	Giulia Maglione	"Cosa resterà degli anni '80"	5,79%
8	Nek	Vittorio Grasso	"Footloose"	8,91%
9	Arisa	Francesca Magnelli	"Spaccacuore"	4,61%
10	Fiorella Mannoia	Fabiana Fraioli	"L'amore non mi basta"	3,81%
11	Arisa	Chantal Guerlement	"Insieme a te non ci sto più"	3,63%
12	Cleme & Rocco	Giosuè Tortorelli	"Buoni o cattivi"	4,98%

Round 2

Order	Coach	Artist	Song	Public Votes
1	Fiorella Mannoia	Sabrina Brodosi	"Miserere"	14,07%
2	Fiorella Mannoia	Anna Cuomo	"Someone like You"	17,57%
3	Arisa	Giovanni Scribano	"Questo piccolo grande amore"	48,13%
4	Nek	Cristina Orsi	"Why"	20,23%

== Elimination Chart ==
Coaches color key

- Artist from Team Cleme & Rocco
- Artist from Team Fiorella
- Artist from Team Arisa
- Artist from Team Nek

Results color key

- Winner
- Runner-up
- Third place
- Fourth place
- Artist was saved by the public vote
- Artist was eliminated

Overall Results
Artist	Round One	Round Two
Giovanni Scribano	Safe	Winner
Cristina Orsi	Safe	Runner-up
Anna Cuomo	Safe	Third place
Sabrina Brodosi	Safe	Fourth place
Paolo Falchi	Eliminated	Eliminated (Round One)
Fabiana Fraioli	Eliminated	Eliminated (Round One)
Vittorio Gasso	Eliminated	Eliminated (Round One)
Chantal Guerlement	Eliminated	Eliminated (Round One)
Giulia Maglione	Eliminated	Eliminated (Round One)
Francesca Magnelli	Eliminated	Eliminated (Round One)
Giosuè Tortorelli	Eliminated	Eliminated (Round One)
Rosella Vespignani	Eliminated	Eliminated (Round One)
