= Sanremo Music Festival 2009 =

Italian song contest (59th edition)

Dates and venue
- Semi-final 1: 17 February 2009
- Semi-final 2: 18 February 2009
- Semi-final 3: 19 February 2009
- Semi-final 4: 20 February 2009
- Final: 21 February 2009
- Venue: Teatro Ariston; Sanremo, Italy

Production
- Broadcaster: Radiotelevisione italiana (RAI)
- Director: Stefano Vicario
- Musical director: Bruno Santori
- Artistic director: Gianmarco Mazzi
- Presenters: Paolo Bonolis and Luca Laurenti

Big Artists section
- Number of entries: 16
- Voting system: Mixed (popular jury and televotes)
- Winner: "La forza mia" Marco Carta

Newcomers' section
- Number of entries: 8
- Voting system: Mixed (jury of journalists, joury of radio experts and televotes)
- Winner: "Sincerità"; Arisa

Sanremofestival.59
- Number of entries: 90
- Voting system: Televotes
- Winner: "Buongiorno gente" Ania

The Sanremo Music Festival 2009 (Italian: Festival di Sanremo 2009), officially the 59th Italian Song Festival (59º Festival della canzone italiana), was the 59th annual Sanremo Music Festival, held at the Teatro Ariston in Sanremo between 17 and 21 February 2009, and broadcast by Radiotelevisione italiana (RAI). It was hosted by Paolo Bonolis and Luca Laurenti. Bonolis, supported by Gianmarzo Mazzi, was also the artistic director of the contest.

The competition was divided into two different sections. The Big Artists section included sixteen well-known singers, performing a previously unheard song, and it was won by Marco Carta's "La forza mia". The Newcomers section, featuring ten debuting or little known artists, was won by Arisa, performing the song "Sincerità". For the first time, a third section was added. Called Sanremofestival.59, it was completely held through the web, and it was won by Ania with the song "Buongiorno gente".

The first half of the inaugural episode was the most viewed TV programme in Italy in 2009, with more than 14 million viewers. The last night of the show was also broadcast live by RTV21 in Albania, RTK in Kosovo and by RSI in Switzerland.

== Presenters and personnel ==
Sanremo Music Festival 2009 presenters

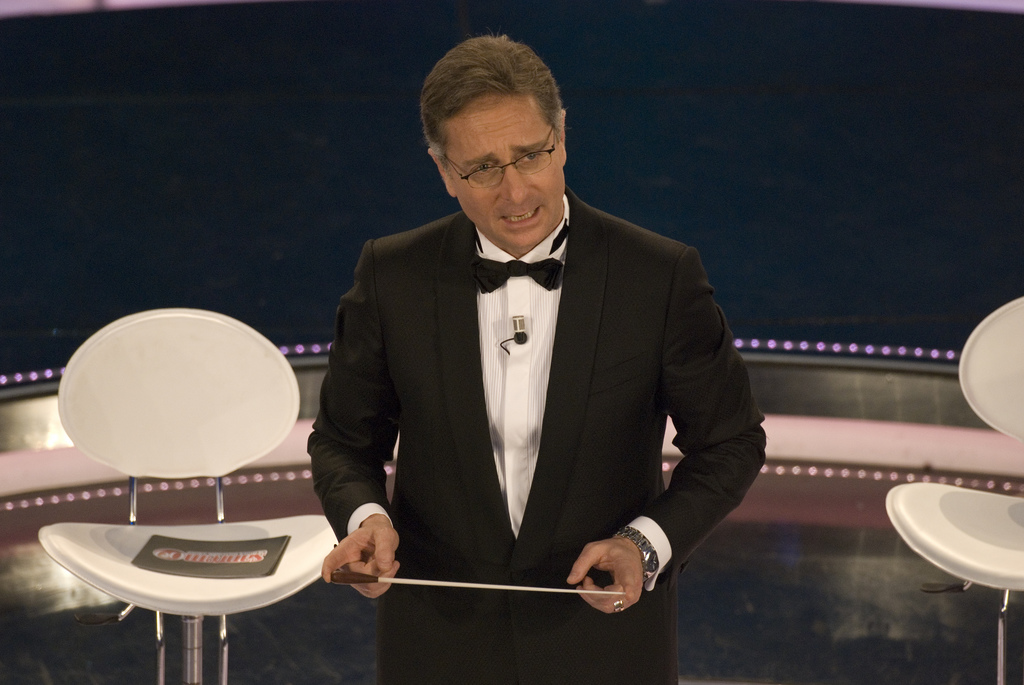
Paolo Bonolis

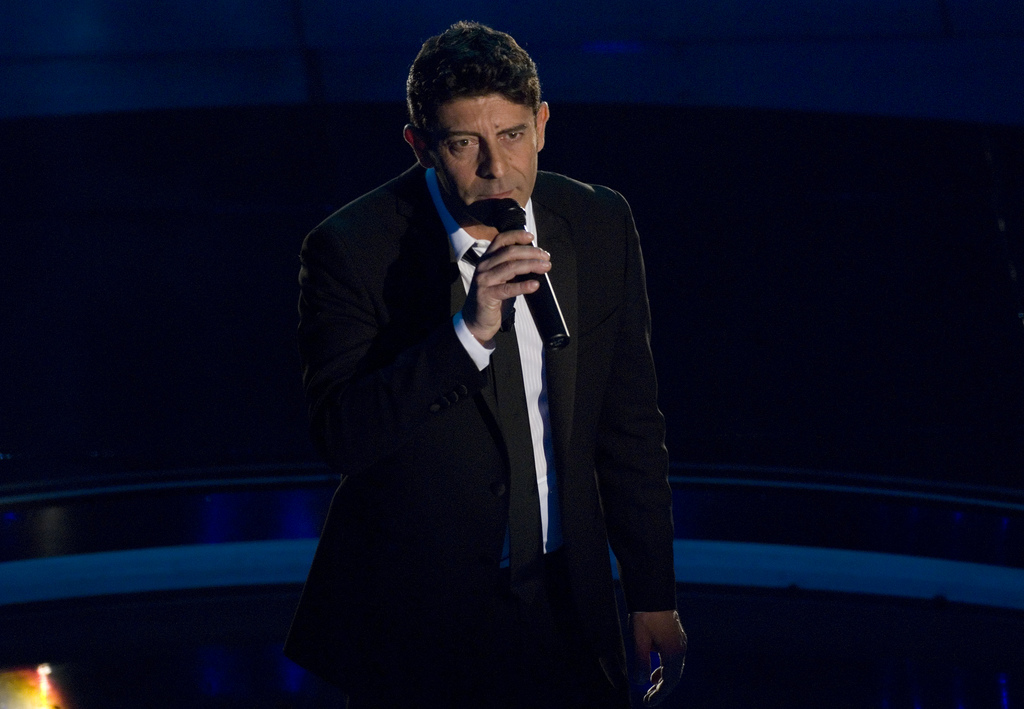
Luca Laurenti

The presenter of the festival, Paolo Bonolis, was announced during a press conference on 11 September 2008 by Rai 1 director Fabrizio Del Noce. Bonolis was also the artistic director of the show, while Gianmarco Mazzi was the musical director of the contest.

Bonolis later confirmed Luca Laurenti, his long-time stage partner, as the co-presenter of the show. During each night, they were joined by a male model and a female celebrity co-presenting the show—Paul Sculfor and Alessia Piovan on the first night, Nir Lavi and Eleonora Abbagnato on the second one, Thyago Alves and Gabriella Pession on the third night, Ivan Olita on the fourth night, David Gandy and Maria De Filippi on the final.

During the show, the Sanremo Festival Orchestra was directed by Bruno Santori. The scenography was created by Gaetano Castelli, while the authors of the show were Barbara Cappi, Cesare Lanza, Marco Salvati and Sergio Rubino.

== Selections ==
=== Newcomers section ===
Two of the artists competing in the newcomers section were selected through the contest SanremoLab, organized by the Comune di Sanremo. During the first step of the contest, eight artists were selected by a jury composed of Massimo Cotto, Franco Zanetti, Paolo Giordano, Massimo Poggini, Andrea Rodini and Maurilio Giordana. The winners—Emily Novak, Simona Molinari, Elisa Casile, Arisa, Edea, Manola Moslehi, Federica Celio and Erika Mineo—were announced on 5 December 2008. On 11 December 2008, they auditioned in front of a different jury, presided by Paolo Bonolis and Gianmarco Mazzi, and on the following day Arisa and Simona Molinari were announced as the first two confirmed competing artists in the Newcomers section of the Sanremo Music Festival 2009.

The remaining eight artists—Karima Ammar, Silvia Aprile, Irene Fornaciari, Iskra, Filippo Perbellini, Chiara Canzian, Malika Ayane and Barbara Gilbo—were chosen through an internal selection, and announced on 22 December 2008, together with the list of participants in the "Big Artists" section.

=== Big Artists section ===
All the artists in the Big Artists section were selected through an internal selection. 104 songs were submitted for the selection, and the sixteen chosen artists—Afterhours, Albano, Alexia with Mario Lavezzi, Marco Carta, Dolcenera, Gemelli Diversi, Fausto Leali, Nicky Nicolai with Stefano Di Battista, Patty Pravo, Povia, Pupo with Paolo Belli and Youssou N'Dour, Francesco Renga, Sal da Vinci, Francesco Tricarico and Iva Zanicchi—were announced on 22 December 2008, together with the selected songs.

== Shows ==
=== First night ===
==== Big Artists section ====
Performances of the contestants of the Newcomers section on the first night
R/O	Artist(s)	Song	Songwriter(s)	Result
1	Dolcenera	"Il mio amore unico"	Dolcenera; Saverio Lanza; Gian Piero Ameli; Oscar Avogadro	Safe
2	Fausto Leali	"Una piccola parte di te"	Franco Fasano; Fabrizio Berlincioni	Safe
3	Francesco Tricarico	"Il bosco delle fragole"	Francesco Tricarico	Eliminated
4	Marco Carta	"La forza mia"	Paolo Carta	Safe
5	Patty Pravo	"E io verrò un giorno là"	Andrea Cutri	Safe
6	Marco Masini	"L'Italia"	Marco Masini; Giuseppe Dati	Safe
7	Francesco Renga	"Uomo senza età"	Francesco Renga; Maurizio Zappatini	Safe
8	Pupo, Paolo Belli & Youssou N'Dour	"L'opportunità"	Mogol; Pupo	Safe
9	Gemelli Diversi	"Vivi per un miracolo"	Luca Aleotti; Alessandro Merli; Emanuele Busnaghi; Francesco Stranges	Safe
10	Albano	"L'amore è sempre amore"	Guido Morra; Maurizio Fabrizio	Safe
11	Afterhours	"Il paese è reale"	Manuel Agnelli; Giorgio Ciccarelli; Rodrigo D'Erasmo; Enrico Gabrielli; Giorgio Prette	Eliminated
12	Iva Zanicchi	"Ti voglio senza amore"	Fabrizio Berlincioni; Franco Fasano	Eliminated
13	Nicky Nicolai & Stefano Di Battista	"Più sole"	Lorenzo Cherubini; Stefano Di Battista	Safe
14	Povia	"Luca era gay"	Giuseppe Povia	Safe
15	Sal Da Vinci	"Non riesco a farti innamorare"	Vincenzo D'Agostino; Gigi D'Alessio; Sal Da Vinci	Safe
15	Alexia & Mario Lavezzi	"Biancaneve"	Mogol; Mario Lavezzi	Safe

==== Newcomers section ====
Performances of the contestants of the Newcomers section on the first night
R/O	Artist(s)	Song	Songwriter(s)
1	Malika Ayane	"Come foglie"	Giuliano Sangiorgi
2	Irene Fornaciari	"Spiove il sole"	Irene Fornaciari; Carlo Ori; Elisabetta Pietrelli; Max Marcolini
3	Simona Molinari	"Egocentrica"	Simona Molinari
4	Filippo Perbellini	"Cuore senza cuore"	Cheope; Riccardo Cocciante

=== Second night ===
==== Big Artists section ====
Performances of the contestants of the Big Artists section on the second night
R/O	Artist(s)	Song	Result
1	Alexia & Mario Lavezzi	"Biancaneve"	Safe
2	Povia	"Luca era gay"	Safe
3	Albano	"L'amore è sempre amore"	Eliminated
4	Nicky Nicolai & Stefano Di Battista	"Più sole"	Eliminated
5	Sal Da Vinci	"Non riesco a farti innamorare"	Eliminated
6	Gemelli Diversi	"Vivi per un miracolo"	Safe
7	Pupo, Paolo Belli & Youssou N'Dour	"L'opportunità"	Safe
8	Francesco Renga	"Uomo senza età"	Safe
9	Marco Masini	"L'Italia"	Safe
10	Patty Pravo	"E io verrò un giorno là"	Safe
11	Marco Carta	"La forza mia"	Safe
12	Fausto Leali	"Una piccola parte di te"	Safe
13	Dolcenera	"Il mio amore unico"	Safe

==== Newcomers section ====
Performances of the contestants of the Newcomers section on the second night
R/O	Artist(s)	Song	Songwriter(s)
1	Silvia Aprile	"Un desiderio arriverà"	Pino Daniele
2	Karima Ammar	"Come in ogni ora"	Karima Ammar; Piero Frassi
3	Arisa	"Sincerità"	Giuseppe Anastasi; Maurizio Filardo; Giuseppe Mangiaracina
4	Chiara Canzian	"Prova a dire il mio nome"	Chiara Canzian; Pellecalamaio
5	Iskra Menarini	"Quasi amore"	Lucio Dalla; Marco Alemanno; Roberto Costa
6	Barbara Gilbo	"Che ne sai di me"	Giancarlo Bigazzi; Barbara Gilbo; Sirio Martelli

=== Third night ===
==== Newcomers section ====
Performances of the contestants of the Newcomers section on the third night
R/O	Artist	Guest artist(s)	Song
1	Filippo Perbellini	Riccardo Cocciante	"Cuore senza cuore"
2	Silvia Aprile	Pino Daniele	"Un desiderio arriverà"
3	Karima Ammar	Burt Bacharach & Mario Biondi	"Come in ogni ora"
4	Irene Fornaciari	Adelmo e i suoi Sorapis	"Spiove il sole"
5	Chiara Canzian	Roberto Vecchioni	"Prova a dire il mio nome"
6	Iskra Menarini	Lucio Dalla	"Quasi amore"
7	Simona Molinari	Ornella Vanoni	"Egocentrica"
8	Arisa	Lelio Luttazzi	"Sincertià"
9	Barbara Gilbo	Massimo Ranieri	"Che ne sai di me"
10	Malika Ayane	Gino Paoli	"Come foglie"

==== Repechage round ====
Performances of the eliminated "Big Artists"
R/O	Artist(s)	Song	Result
1	Nicky Nicolai & Stefano Di Battista	"Più sole"	Eliminated
2	Iva Zanicchi	"Ti voglio senza amore"	Eliminated
3	Sal Da Vinci	"Non riesco a farti innamorare"	Back in competition
4	Albano	"L'amore è sempre amore"	Back in competition
5	Afterhours	"Il paese è reale"	Eliminated
6	Francesco Tricarico	"Il bosco delle fragole"	Eliminated

=== Fourth night ===
==== Big Artists section ====
Performances of the contestants of the Big Artists section on the fourth night
R/O	Artist(s)	Guest artist(s)	Song	Result
1	Pupo, Paolo Belli & Youssou N'Dour	Gianni Morandi	"L'opportunità"	Safe
2	Patty Pravo	Dave Weckl, Nathan East, Todd Rundgren	"E io verrò un giorno là"	Safe
3	Sal Da Vinci	Gigi D'Alessio	"Non riesco a farti innamorare"	Safe
4	Fausto Leali	Fabrizio Moro	"Una piccola parte di te"	Safe
5	Dolcenera	Syria	"Il mio amore unico"	Eliminated
6	Francesco Renga	Daniela Dessì	"Uomo senza età"	Safe
7	Alexia & Mario Lavezzi	Teo Teocoli, Orphin	"Biancaneve"	Safe
8	Albano	Michele Placido	"L'amore è sempre amore"	Safe
9	Marco Masini	Francesco Benigno	"L'Italia"	Safe
10	Povia	Massimiliano Varrese, Rossella Infante, Alessandro Matta	"Luca era gay"	Safe
11	Marco Carta	Tazenda	"La forza mia"	Safe
12	Gemelli Diversi	BMB Marching Band	"Vivi per un miracolo"	Eliminated

==== Newcomers section ====
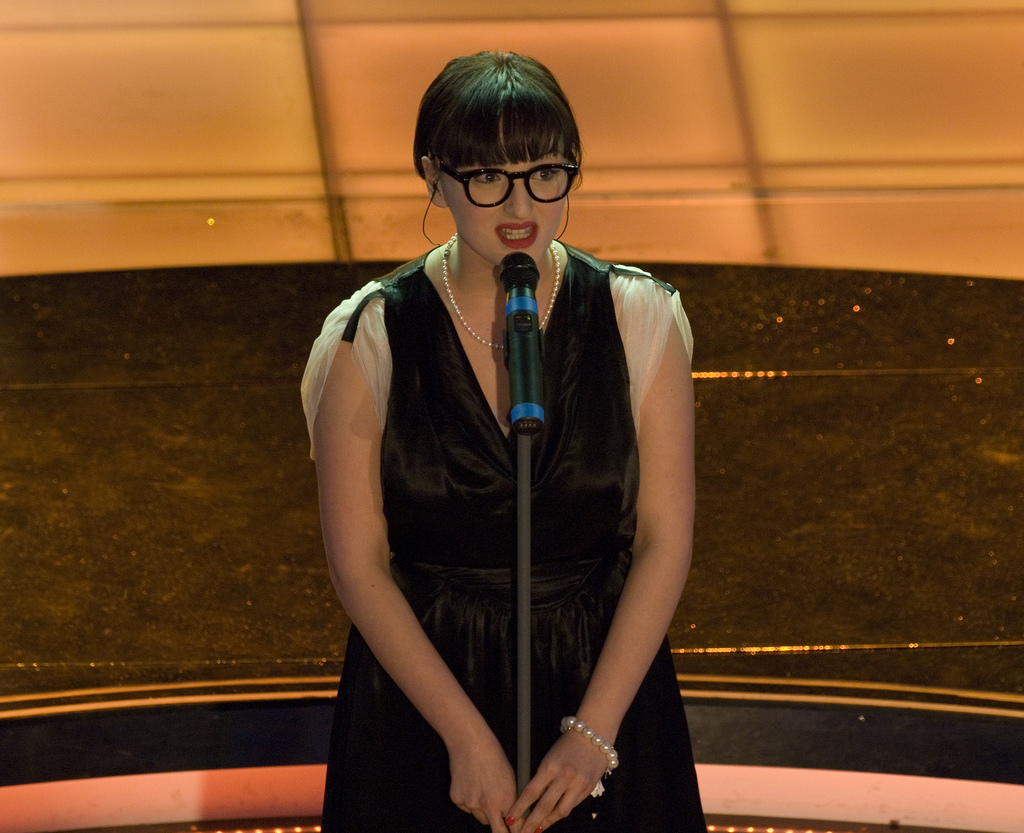
Arisa, winner of the Newcomers section, performing her entry "Sincerità" during the Sanremo Music Festival 2009.

Performances of the contestants of the Newcomers section on the fourth night
R/O	Artist	Song	Result
1	Barbara Gilbo	"Che ne sai di me"	——
2	Malika Ayane	"Come foglie"	——
3	Chiara Canzian	"Prova a dire il mio nome"	——
4	Simona Molinari	"Egocentrica"	——
5	Arisa	"Sincerità"	Winner
6	Karima Ammar	"Come in ogni ora"	——
7	Irene Fornaciari	"Spiove il sole"	——
8	Iskra Menarini	"Quasi amore"	——
9	Silvia Aprile	"Un desiderio arriverà"	——
10	Filippo Perbellini	"Cuore senza cuore"	——

=== Fifth night ===
==== First round ====
Performances of the "Big Artists" on the first round of the final
R/O	Artist	Song	Result
1	Sal Da Vinci	"Non riesco a farti innamorare"	Top three
2	Pupo, Paolo Belli, Youssou N'Dour	"L'opportunità"	Eliminated
3	Povia	"Luca era gay"	Top three
4	Patty Pravo	"E io verrò un giorno là"	Eliminated
5	Francesco Renga	"Uomo senza età"	Eliminated
6	Marco Carta	"La forza mia"	Top three
7	Albano	"L'amore è sempre amore"	Eliminated
8	Marco Masini	"L'Italia"	Eliminated
9	Fausto Leali	"Una piccola parte di te"	Eliminated
10	Alexia & Mario Lavezzi	"Biancaneve"	Eliminated

==== Second round ====
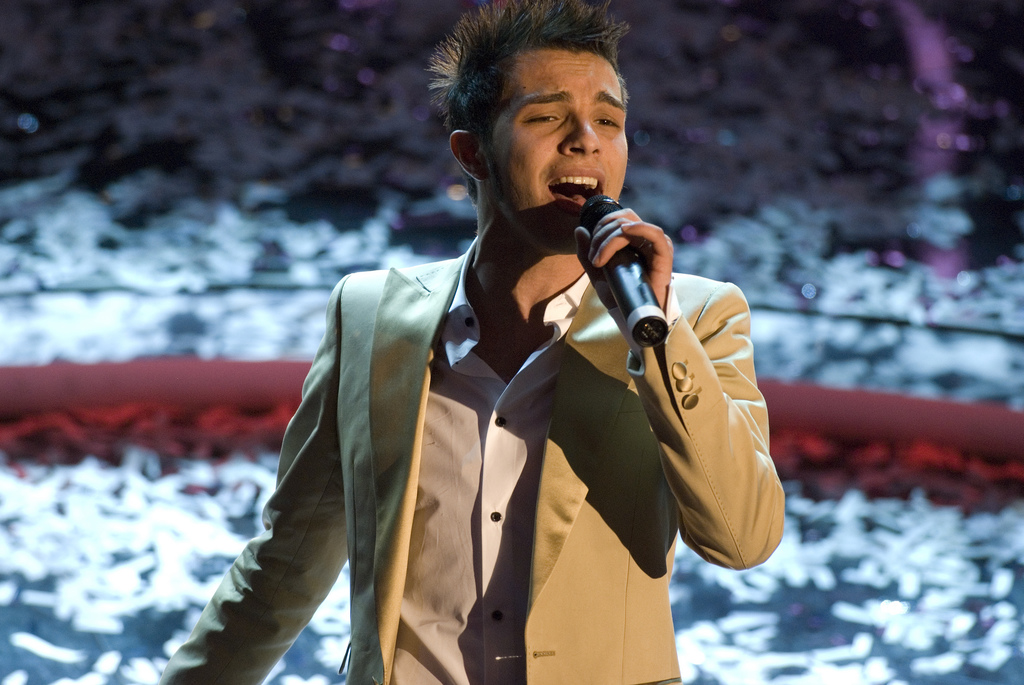
Marco Carta performing the song "La forza mia" after he was announced the winner of the Sanremo Music Festival 2009.

Performances of the "Big Artists" on the second round of the final
R/O	Artist	Song	Result
1	Marco Carta	"La forza mia"	1
2	Povia	"Luca era gay"	2
3	Sal Da Vinci	"Non riesco a farti innamorare"	3

== Other awards ==
=== Critics Award "Mia Martini" ===
==== Big Artists section ====
Points received by the "Big Artists" for the Critics Award
Artist	Song	Points	Result
Afterhours	"Il paese è reale"	21	Winner
Nicky Nicolai & Stefano Di Battista	"Più sole"	20	Second place
Francesco Tricarico	"Il bosco delle fragole"	20	Second place
Patty Pravo	"E io verrò un giorno là"	12	Fourth place
Francesco Renga	"Uomo senza età"	8	Fifth place
Gemelli Diversi	"Vivi per un miracolo"	5	Sixth place
Albano	"L'amore è sempre amore"	4	Seventh place
Alexia & Mario Lavezzi	"Biancaneve"	3	Eighth place
Marco Masini	"L'Italia"	3	Eighth place
Povia	"Luca era gay"	3	Eighth place
Dolcenera	"Il mio amore unico"	2	Eleventh place
Iva Zanicchi	"Ti voglio senza amore"	1	Twelfth place

==== Newcomers section ====
Points received by the newcomers for the Critics Award
Artist	Song	Points	Result
Arisa	"Sincerità"	47	Winner
Malika Ayane	"Come foglie"	17	Second place
Simona Molinari	"Egocentrica"	13	Third place
Karima Ammar	"Come in ogni ora"	12	Fourth place
Iskra Menarini	"Quasi amore"	5	Fifth place
Chiara Canzian	"Prova a dire il mio nome"	4	Sixth place
Irene Fornaciari	"Spiove il sole"	1	Seventh place
Filippo Perbellini	"Cuore senza cuore"	1	Seventh place

=== Press, Radio & TV Award ===
==== Big Artists section ====
Points received by the newcomers for the Press, Radio & TV Award
Artist	Song	Points	Result
Povia	"Luca era gay"	19	Winner
Patty Pravo	"E io verrò un giorno là"	14	Second place
Marco Masini	"L'Italia"	6	Third place
Dolcenera	"Il mio amore unico"	6	Third place
Afterhours	"Il paese è reale"	5	Fifth place
Francesco Renga	"Uomo senza età"	4	Sixth place
Sal Da Vinci	"Non riesco a farti innamorare"	3	Seventh place
Gemelli Diversi	"Vivi per un miracolo"	3	Seventh place
Nicky Nicolai & Stefano Di Battista	"Più sole"	3	Seventh place
Francesco Tricarico	"Il bosco delle fragole"	3	Seventh place
Alexia & Mario Lavezzi	"Biancaneve"	1	Eleventh place
Fausto Leali	"Una piccola parte di te"	1	Eleventh place
Pupo, Paolo Belli & Youssou N'Dour	"L'opportunità"	1	Eleventh place

==== Newcomers section ====
- Winner: Arisa with "Sincerità".

== Sanremofestival.59 ==
The contest Sanremofestival.59 was a singing contest held through the web and strictly related to the Sanremo Music Festival 2009. 470 songs were submitted and published on the official website of the Sanremo Music Festival. Each artist was later auditioned by a jury composed of Paolo Bonolis, Gianmarco Mazzi, Gigio D'Ambrosio, Mariolina Simone and Maria Cristina De Amicis, and 100 songs were admitted to the next stage of the competition.

The winner of the contest was determined by the public's vote only. On 19 February 2012, it was announced that Ania placed first with the song "Buongiorno gente". During the last night of the show, she received the award and she performed her song at the Teatro Ariston.

== Ratings ==
Episode	Date	Viewers	Share
Night 1	17 February 2009	10,114,000	47.93%
Night 2	18 February 2009	9,856,000	42.63%
Night 3	19 February 2009	9,238,000	47,17%
Night 4	20 February 2009	10,219,000	47.47%
Night 5	21 February 2009	12,309,000	54.25%

== Controversy ==
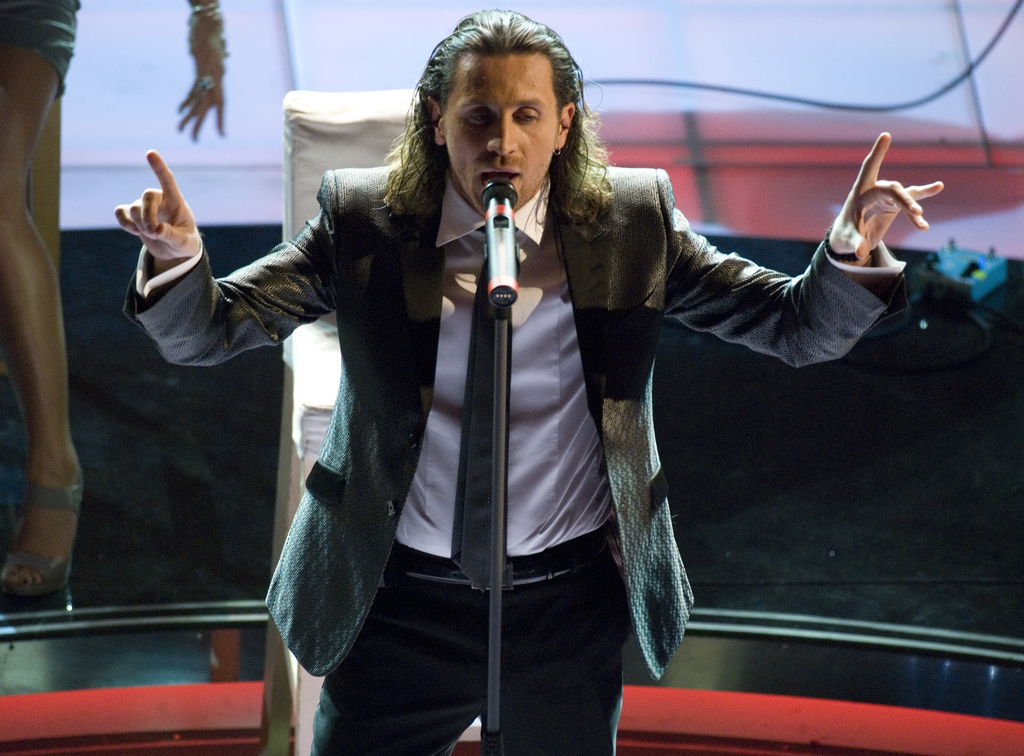
Povia at the 2009 Sanremo Festival

Povia's entry "Luca era gay" (English: "Luca was gay"), went on to place second at the festival, was considered by some gay rights organizations as an anti-gay song. The controversy was also based on the name of the song's character: according to Aurelio Mancuso, president of the Arcigay, the name refers to Luca Tolvi, who claimed that Joseph Nicolosi cured his homosexuality. Povia denied this thesis and claimed that the song is about a man he met on a train, whose real name was Massimiliano.
