= Amami (album) =

Studio album by Arisa
- Released: 19 February 2012
- Recorded: 2011
- Length: 37:57
- Label: Warner Music
- Producer: Mauro Pagani

Arisa chronology
Malamorenò (2010)	Amami (2012)	Amami Tour (2012)

Singles from Amami
- 1. "La notte" Released: February 15, 2012; 2. "L'amore è un'altra cosa" Released: May 4, 2012

Amami is the third album released by the Italian singer Arisa, it features the singles "La notte" and "L'amore è un'altra cosa".

== Track list ==
All lyrics are written by Giuseppe Anastasi, except where noted; all music is composed by Anastasi, except where noted.

No.	Title	Length
1.	"Amami" (lyric and music: Arisa)	3:55
2.	"Il tempo che verrà" (lyrics: Anastasi, Arisa; music: Gioni Barbera)	3:30
3.	"La notte"	3:55
4.	"L'amore è un'altra cosa"	3:43
5.	"Ci sei e se non ci sei"	3:57
6.	"Democrazia"	2:30
7.	"Bene se ti sta bene"	3:25
8.	"Poi però"	3:21
9.	"Si vola"	3:51
10.	"Nel regno di chissà che c'è"	2:44
11.	"Missiva d'amore" (lyrics and music: Arisa)	3:06

== Charts ==
Chart (2012)	Peak position
Italian Albums (FIMI)	6
