= Ti rincontrerò (song) =

Single by Marco Carta

from the album Ti rincontrerò
- Released: June 6, 2008
- Recorded: 2008
- Genre: Pop

Marco Carta singles chronology
"Per sempre" (2008)	"Ti rincontrerò" (2008)

"Ti rincontrerò" is a single by the Italian singer Marco Carta. It was the first single to be released, in 2008, from the album Ti rincontrerò.

== Chart performance ==
Chart (2008)	Peak position
Italian FIMI Singles Chart	11
