= Per sempre (Marco Carta song) =

Single by Marco Carta

from the album Ti brucia
- Released: 2008
- Recorded: 2007
- Genre: Pop
- Length: 4:21

Marco Carta singles chronology
"Per sempre" (2008)	"Ti rincontrerò" (2008)

"Per sempre" was the first single by Italian singer Marco Carta. It is part of Amici's compilation album Ti brucia and later included in his debut album Ti rincontrerò.

It was realised in Italy in March 2008 and obtained notable success.

== Chart performance ==
Chart (2008)	Peak position
Italian FIMI Singles Chart	44
Italy iTunes top 100	18
