= Controvento (song) =

Single by Arisa

from the album Se vedo te
- Released: 18 February 2014
- Genre: Pop
- Length: 3:39
- Label: Warner Music Italy
- Songwriter: Giuseppe Anastasi
- Producer: Carlo Ubaldo Rossi

Arisa singles chronology
"Meraviglioso amore mio" (2012)	"Controvento" (2014)	"Quante parole che non dici" (2014)

Music video
- "Controvento" on YouTube

"Controvento"("Against the Wind") is a song recorded by Italian singer Arisa. Written by Giuseppe Anastasi, the song was produced by Carlo Ubaldo Rossi. Released in Italy on 18 February 2014 as the lead single of Arisa's fourth studio album Se vedo te, the song was commercially successful in Italy after winning the Sanremo Music Festival 2014, debuting at number one on the FIMI Singles Chart and being certified platinum for domestic downloads exceeding 30,000.

== Charts ==
Chart (2014)	Peak position
Italy (FIMI)	1
Italy Airplay (EarOne)	3
Slovenia (SloTop50)	40
Switzerland (Schweizer Hitparade)	48
