= Ti rincontrerò (album) =

Studio album by Marco Carta
- Released: June 13, 2008
- Genre: Pop
- Label: Warner Bros./Atlantic
- Producer: Mario Lavezzi

Ti rincontrerò is the first solo studio album by Italian singer Marco Carta. It was released on June 13, 2008.

== Track listing ==
1. Per sempre
2. Anima di nuvola
3. Un grande libro nuovo
4. Ti rincontrerò
5. A chi (Hurt)
6. E tu
7. Ti pretendo
8. Cielo nel cielo
9. La donna cannone
10. Vita (duet with Luca Jurman)

== Charts ==
Weekly chart performance for "Ti rincontrerò"
Chart (2008)	Peak position
Italy Albums Chart (FIMI)	3
