= Arisa =

Italian singer

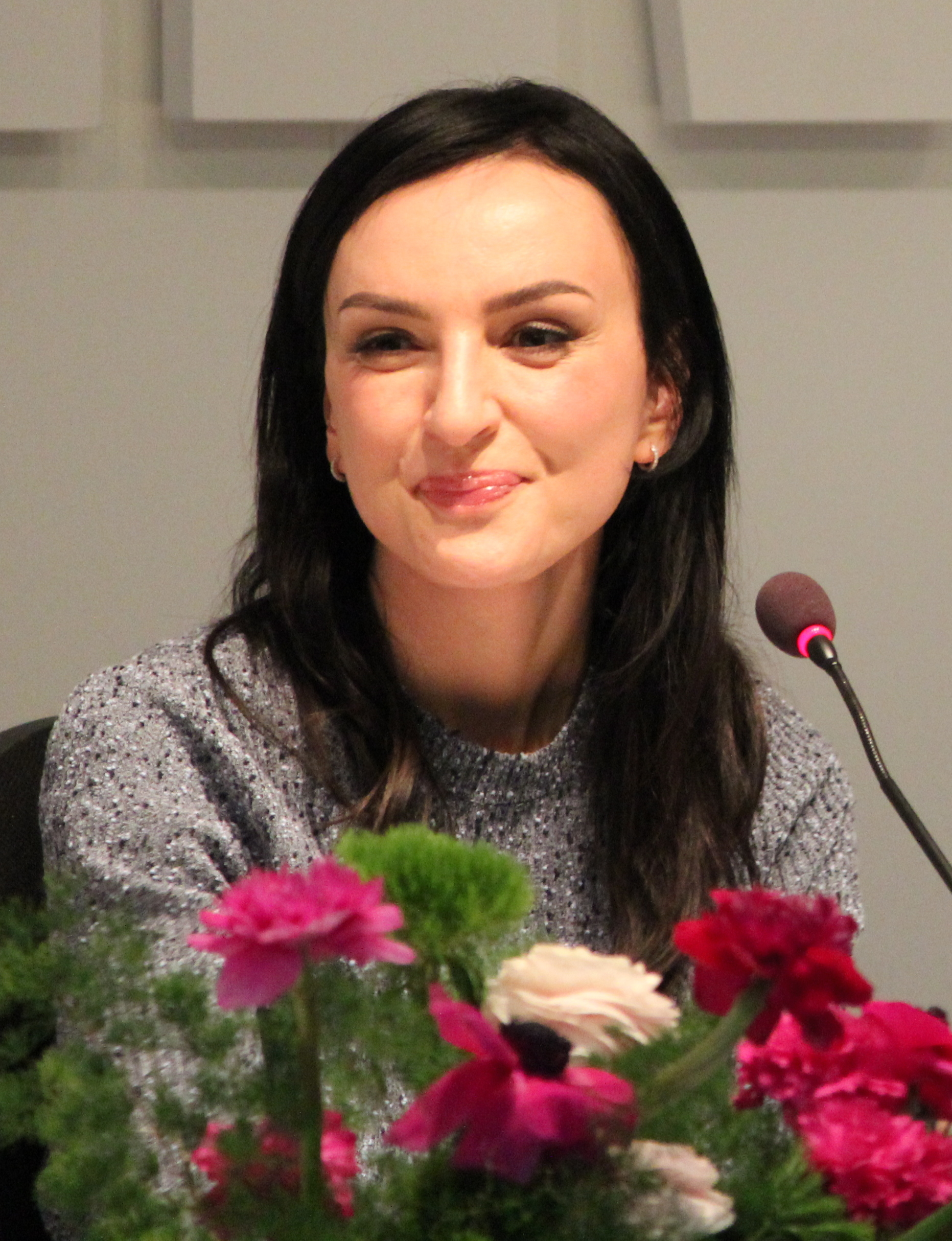
- Arisa in 2026

Background information
- Born: Rosalba Pippa; 20 August 1982 (age 44); Genoa, Liguria, Italy
- Origin: Pignola, Basilicata, Italy
- Genre: Pop
- Occupations: Singer; songwriter; actress; television personality
- Instrument: Vocals
- Years active: 2009–present
- Labels: Warner; Pipshow

Rosalba Pippa (born 20 August 1982), better known by her stage name Arisa, is an Italian singer, songwriter, actress, and television personality.

== Early life ==
Arisa was born in Genoa, in Liguria. In 1999, she won first prize in the Cantacavallo competition in Teggiano for her singing ability.

Her stage name is an acronym of her family members' names: A from her father, Antonio; R from her own name, Rosalba; I and S from her sisters, Isabella and Sabrina; and A from her mother, Assunta.

== Career ==
Arisa rose to fame after her participation in the Sanremo Music Festival 2009. She placed first in the newcomers' section and won the Mia Martini Critics Award with her entry Sincerità. In early 2009, she released her first album, also titled Sincerità.

In January 2010, she released her second album, Malamorenò. In late 2011 she starred as judge in the fifth season of the Italian version of The X Factor, broadcast on Sky Uno.

In February 2012, Arisa returned to the Italian musical scene, performing her single La notte in the Sanremo Music Festival. The song placed second in the competition and it later topped the Italian Singles Chart. It was also included in her third studio album, Amami, which was released on 15 February 2012. In February 2014, Arisa won the Sanremo Music Festival with the song Controvento.

The album Una nuova Rosalba in città was released on 8 February 2019 and Ero romantica on 26 November 2021. At the end of the same year, she took part in Dancing with the Stars, where she won as a couple with the dancer Vito Coppola.

Since 2023, Arisa has been featured as a coach on nine combined seasons across The Voice Senior, The Voice Kids, and The Voice Generations. She was the winning coach on the seventh season of The Voice Senior, when her final artist, Giovanni Scribano, won the season.

On 30 November 2025, she was announced among the participants of the Sanremo Music Festival 2026. She competed with the song "Magica favola". In the 2026 festival, "Magica Favola" was performed as her entry in the competition.

== Discography ==
=== Studio albums ===
List of albums, with selected chart positions and certifications
Title	Album details	Peak chart positions		Certifications
Title	Album details	ITA	SWI	Certifications
Sincerità	Released: 20 February 2009; Label: Warner Music Italy; Formats: CD, digital download	5	94	FIMI: Gold
Malamorenò	Released: 19 February 2010; Label: Warner Music Italy; Formats: CD, digital download	23	—	
Amami	Released: 15 February 2012; Label: Warner Music Italy; Formats: CD, digital download	6	—	FIMI: Platinum
Se vedo te	Released: 20 February 2014; Label: Warner Music Italy; Formats: CD, digital download	3	—	
Guardando il cielo	Released: 13 February 2016; Label: Warner Music Italy; Formats: CD, digital download	16	—	
Una nuova Rosalba in città	Released: 8 February 2019; Label: Sugar Music; Formats: CD, digital download	22	—	
Ero romantica	Released: 26 November 2021; Label: Pipshow; Formats: CD, digital download	36	—	
Foto mosse	Released: 17 April 2026; Label: Warner Music Italy, Pipshow; Formats: CD, digital download, streaming	11	—	
"—" denotes albums that did not chart

=== Live albums ===
List of albums, with selected chart positions and certifications
Title	Album details	Peak chart positions
Title	Album details	ITA
Amami tour	Released: 10 November 2013; Label: Warner Music Italy; Formats: CD, digital download	17

=== Compilations ===
List of albums, with selected chart positions and certifications
Title	Album details	Peak chart positions
Title	Album details	ITA
Voce - The Best of	Released: 25 November 2016; Label: Warner Music Italy; Formats: CD, digital download	53
Controvento - The Best of	Released: 8 February 2019; Label: Warner Music Italy; Formats: CD, digital download	72

=== Singles ===
==== As lead artist ====
List of singles, with selected chart positions, showing year released and album name
Single	Year	Peak chart positions		Certifications	Album
Single	Year	ITA	SWI	Certifications	Album
"Sincerità"	2009	1	61		Sincerità
"Io sono"	2009	—	—		Sincerità
"Te lo volevo dire"	2009	—	—		Sincerità
"Malamorenò"	2010	4	61	FIMI: Platinum	Malamorenò
"Pace"	2010	—	—		Malamorenò
"La notte"	2012	1	—	FIMI: 4× Platinum	Amami
"L'amore è un'altra cosa"	2012	25	—	FIMI: Gold	Amami
"Meraviglioso amore mio"	2012	15	—	FIMI: Platinum	Amami tour
"Controvento"	2014	1	48	FIMI: Platinum	Se vedo te
"Quante parole che non dici"	2014	—	—		Se vedo te
"La cosa più importante"	2014	—	—		Se vedo te
"Guardando il cielo"	2016	19	—	FIMI: Gold	Guardando il cielo
"Voce"	2016	—	—		Guardando il cielo
"Una notte ancora"	2016	—	—		Guardando il cielo
"Ho perso il mio amore"	2017	—	—		La verità, vi spiego, sull'amore
"Ho cambiato i piani"	2017	—	—		Nove lune e mezza
"Vasame"	2017	—	—		Naples in Veils
"Mi sento bene"	2019	17	—		Una nuova Rosalba in città
"Una nuova Rosalba in città"	2019	—	—		Una nuova Rosalba in città
"Tam Tam"	2019	—	—		Una nuova Rosalba in città
"Nucleare" (with Manupuma)	2020	—	—		Non-album singles
"Ricominciare ancora"	2020	—	—		Non-album singles
"Potevi fare di più"	2021	16	—	FIMI: Gold	Ero romantica
"Quando" (with Michele Bravi)	2021	—	—		Non-album single
"Ortica"	2021	—	—		Ero romantica
"Psyco"	2021	—	—		Ero romantica
"Altalene" (featuring Brown & Gray)	2021	—	—		Ero romantica
"Cuore"	2021	—	—		Ero romantica
"Verosimile"	2022	—	—		Devotion, a Story of Love and Desire
"Tu mi perdición"	2022	—	—		Non-album singles
"Non vado via"	2023	—	—		Non-album singles
"Magica favola"	2026	9	—		Foto mosse
"Il tuo profumo"	2026	—	—		Foto mosse
"Rugiada"	2026	—	—		Foto mosse

==== As featured artist ====
List of singles, with selected chart positions, showing year released and album name
Single	Year	Peak chart positions		Certifications	Album
Single	Year	ITA	SWI	Certifications	Album
"Fragili" (Club Dogo featuring Arisa)	2014	1	—	FIMI: Platinum	Non siamo più quelli di mi fist
"L'esercito del selfie" (Takagi & Ketra featuring Lorenzo Fragola and Arisa)	2017	4	53	FIMI: 3× Platinum	Non-album single
"DJ di m****" (Lo Stato Sociale featuring Arisa and Myss Keta)	2019	—	—		Non-album single
"Rincontrarsi un giorno a Milano" (La Scapigliatura featuring Arisa)	2020	—	—		Non-album single
"Coro azzurro" (Gli Autogol e Dj Matrix featuring Arisa e Ludwig)	2021	50	—	FIMI: Gold	Musica da giostra: Volume 8
"Cioccolata bianca" (DJ Matrix featuring Arisa)	2021	—	—		Non-album single
"Fiori e fango" (Mondo Marcio featuring Arisa)	2022	—	—		Magico
"La costiera amalfitana" (Fabio Rovazzi featuring Arisa and Nino D'Angelo)	2026	37	—		Non-album single

== Awards ==
Year	Award	Nomination	Work	Result
2009	Sanremo Music Festival	Newcomers	"Sincerità"	Won
2009	Sanremo Music Festival	Newcomers' Critics Award "Mia Martini"	"Sincerità"	Won
2009	Sanremo Music Festival	Newcomers' Press, Radio & TV Award	"Sincerità"	Won
2009	Sanremo Music Festival	Assomusica Award	"Sincerità"	Won
2009	Mogol Award	Best Lyrics	"Sincerità"	Nominated
2009	Wind Music Awards	Revelation of the Year	Herself	Won
2009	Venice Music Awards	Revelation of the Year	Herself	Won
2010	TRL Awards	Best Look	Herself	Nominated
2010	Mogol Award	Best Lyrics	"Pace"	Nominated
2010	Premio Videoclip Italiano	Best Video by a Female Artist	"Malamorenò"	Nominated
2012	Sanremo Music Festival	Big Artists	"La notte"	2nd place
2012	Sanremo Music Festival	Big Artists Press, Radio & TV Award	"La notte"	Won
2012	Lunezia Award	Lunezia Award for Sanremo	"La notte"	Won
2014	Sanremo Music Festival	Big Artists	"Controvento"	Won
2016	Sanremo Music Festival	Big Artists	"Guardando il cielo"	10th place
2019	Sanremo Music Festival	Big Artists	"Mi sento bene"	8th place
2021	Sanremo Music Festival	Big Artists	"Potevi fare di più"	10th place

== Filmography ==
=== Films ===
Year	Title	Role	Notes
2011	Tutta colpa della musica	Chiara	
2011	The Worst Week of My Life	Martina	
2011	A Monster in Paris	Lucille	Italian dub; voice role
2012	Lightning Strike	Tina	
2013	Despicable Me 2	Lucy Wilde	Italian dub; voice role
2017	Nove lune e mezza	Pregnant woman	Cameo appearance
2017	Despicable Me 3	Lucy Wilde	Italian dub; voice role
2017	La verità, vi spiego, sull'amore	Paola	
2019	Lady and the Tramp	Peg	Italian dub; voice role
2021	Adda passà 'a nuttata	Cashier	Short film
2022	Vera	Herself	Cameo appearance

=== Television ===
Year	Title	Role	Notes
2009	Sanremo Music Festival 2009	Contestant	Winner in the section "Nuove proposte"
2010	Victor Victoria: Niente è come sembra	Regular guest	Italian talk show
2011–2012; 2016	The X Factor: Italy	Coach	Italian talent show (seasons 5–6; 10)
2012	Sanremo Music Festival 2012	Contestant	Runner-up with the song "La notte"
2014	Sanremo Music Festival 2014	Contestant	Winner with the song "Controvento"
2015	Sanremo Music Festival 2015	Co-host	Annual music festival
2015	Monte Bianco: Sfida Verticale	Contestant	Italian game show; contestant
2016	Sanremo Music Festival 2016	Contestant	10th place with the song "Guardando il cielo"
2018	Amici di Maria De Filippi	Judge	Italian talent show (season 18)
2019	Prodigi: La musica è vita	Judge	Italian talent show (season 4)
2020	Il cantante mascherato	Contestant	Italian talent show (season 1)
2020–2023	Amici di Maria De Filippi	Singing teacher	Italian talent show (season 20, 22)
2021	Sanremo Music Festival 2021	Contestant	10th place with the song "Potevi fare di più"
2021	Ballando con le Stelle	Contestant	Italian talent show (season 16)
2022	Il cantante mascherato	Judge	Italian talent show (season 3)
2022	L'eredità	Contestant	Italian game show (1 episode)
2023	Sanremo Music Festival 2023	Guest performer	Annual music festival
2023	The Voice Kids	Coach	Italian talent show (season 2)
2024	Sanremo Music Festival 2024	Guest performer	Annual music festival
2024–2025	The Voice Senior	Coach	Italian talent show (seasons 3–4)
2026	Sanremo Music Festival 2026	Contestant	4th place with the song "Magica favola"

Awards and achievements
Preceded by Marco Mengoni	Sanremo Music Festival; Winner; 2014	Succeeded by Il Volo
