= Giuseppe Anastasi =

Italian composer and musician

- Born: 23 August 1976 (age 50); Palermo, Sicily, Italy
- Genre: Pop
- Occupations: Composer; musician; music producer
- Years active: 2001–present

Giuseppe Anastasi (born 23 August 1976) is an Italian composer and musician from Palermo, Sicily.

== Life and career ==
Anastasi was born to a father from Marsala and a mother from Palermo. At the age of 21, he was admitted to a music school in Rome, Cet di Mogol. In 2001 he collaborated with Francesco Baccini, whom he wrote the song "Son resuscitato" and five years later, in 2006, he participated in the music festival Musicultura, where he reached to the final of the event with the song "Lo specchio".

When he was working in the CET, as an assistant, he met with Arisa. He composed "Sincerità" for her, along with composers Maurizio Filardo and Giuseppe Mangiaracina, which won the "Newcomers' section" and the "Critic's prize" of Sanremo Music Festival 2009. In 2011, he composed the song "Sensi" for Anna Tatangelo. He won the Sanremo Music Festival 2014 as a composer with the song "Controvento" by Arisa.
