= The Voice Senior (Italian TV series) season 2 =

The Voice Senior
- Season 2
- Presented by: Antonella Clerici
- Coaches: Gigi D'Alessio; Loredana Bertè; Clementino; Orietta Berti

Release
- Original network: Rai 1
- Original release: 26 November 2021 – 21 January 2022

Season chronology
- ← Previous; Season 1 Next → Season 3

The second season of the Italian singing competition The Voice Senior started to air on 26 November 2021, on Rai 1. All coaches from the previous season returned except for I Caricci (Al Bano and Jasmine Carrisi). Orietta Berti was announced to be the new coach of the show, joining Loredana Bertè, Clementino and Gigi D'Alessio.

Antonella Clerici is the host of the programme.

Annibale Giannarelli was announced as the winner, marking Gigi D'Alessio's first win as a coach. Gigi was also the first ever coach in The Voice of Italy to win more than one season.

== Coaches ==
The Voice Senior season 2 coaches

Loredana Bertè

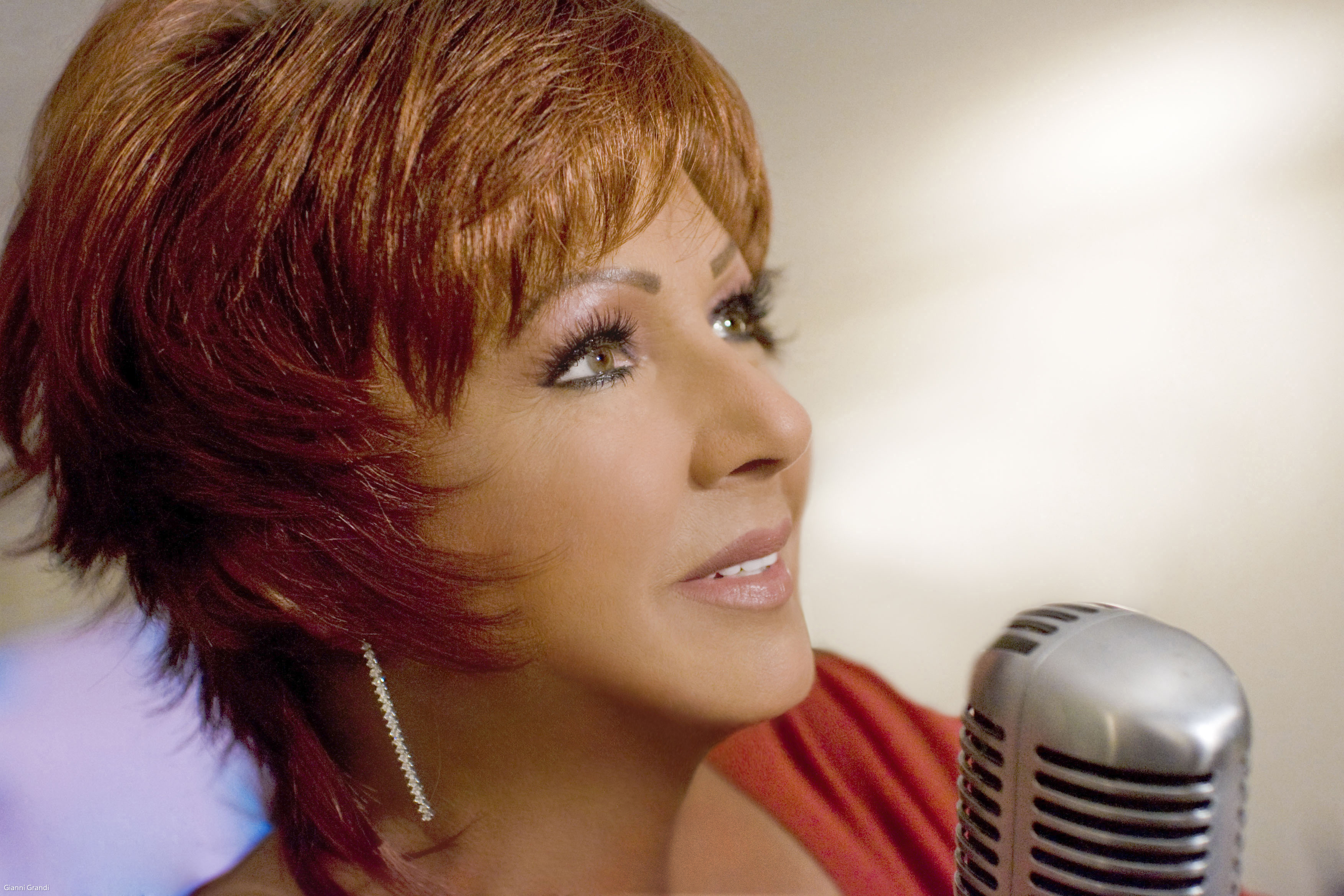
Orietta Berti

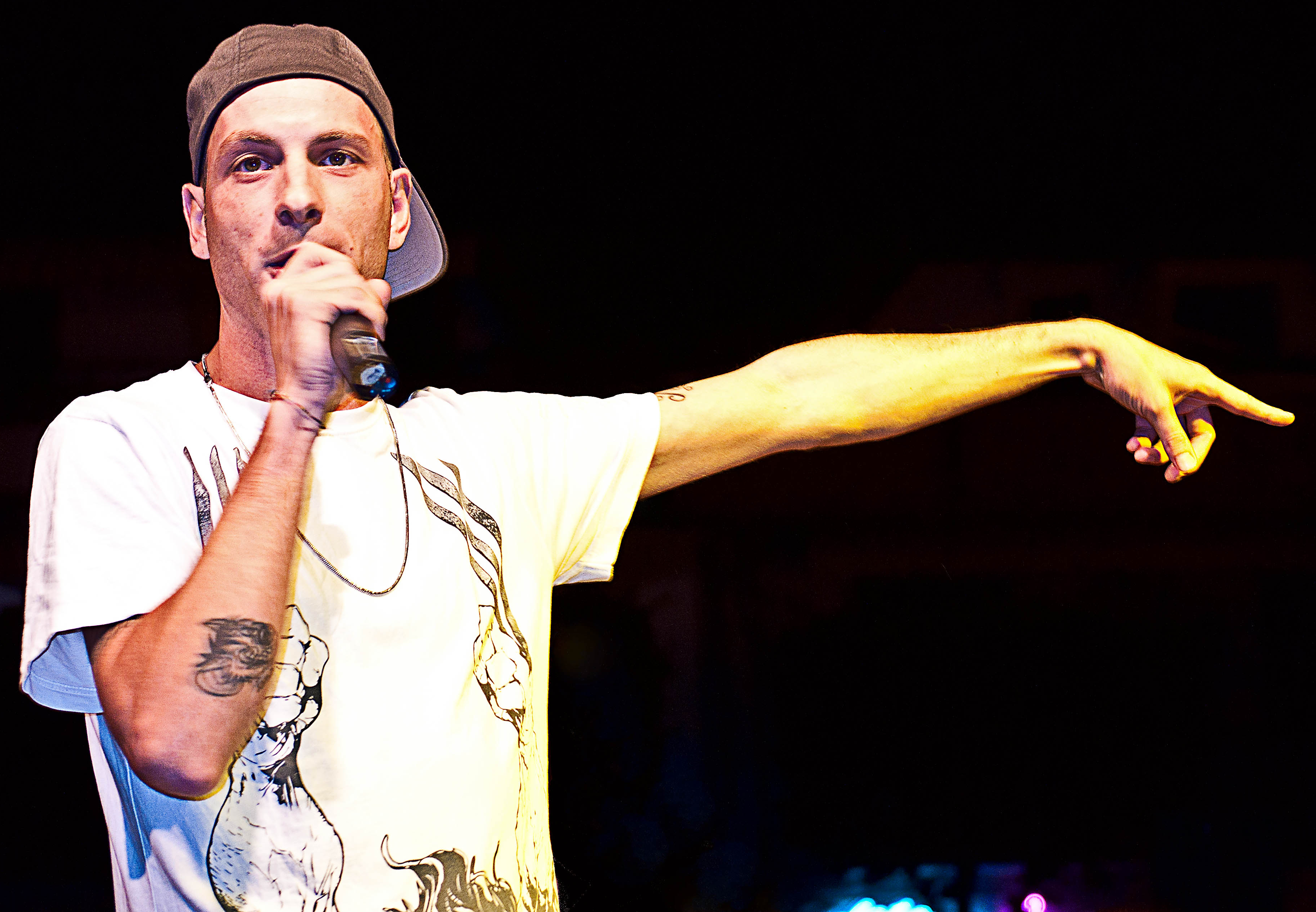
Clementino

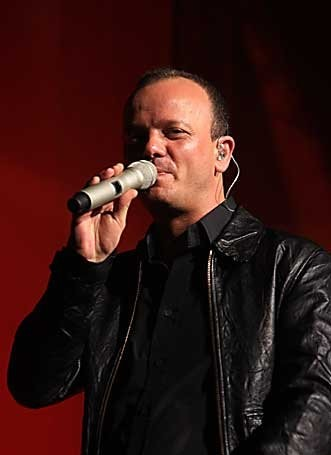
Gigi D'Alessio

On 16 July 2021, Rai 1 announces that The Voice Senior will be back on screen for its second season. In the same date, announced that Orietta Beri will be the new coach for the upcoming season, replacing the duo coach I Carrisi (Al Bano and Jasmine Carrisi).

== Teams ==
- Winner
- Runner-up
- Third place
- Fourth place
- Eliminated in the Final
- Eliminated in the Knockouts
- Eliminated in the Best of six
- Withdrew

Coaches	Top 60 artists				
Orietta Berti	Franco Tortora	Roberto Barocelli	Daniele Montenero	Cosetta Gigli	Mari Gatti
Orietta Berti	Rosa Giannoccaro	Xin Xu	Gino Caiafa	Rossella Boni	Giacomo Sebastiani
Orietta Berti	Emma Armetta	Oscar Luigi Cecovig	Eugenia Munari	Remo Tedesco	Rommy
Clementino	Marcella Di Pasquale	Russell Russell	Luciano Genovesi	Arthur Miles	Vittorio Bonetti
Clementino	Pino Pugelli	Giuseppe Mariniello	Matteo Schiavone	Angelo De Niro	Fabrizio Fierro
Clementino	Paolo Benedetti	Stefano Nosei	Angelo Elli	Vanna D'Ambrosio	Antonia Gagliano
Gigi D'Alessio	Annibale Giannarelli	Claudia Arvati	Piero & Beatrice	Carmen Marchese	Lalo Cibelli
Gigi D'Alessio	Fabrizio Pausini	Ida Lertora	Eddie Oliva	Diva Agata Mongiovì	Barbara Errico
Gigi D'Alessio	Paola Pompei	Adriano Gradi	Laura Landi	Luisa Malafarina	Liliana Tambornini
Loredana Bertè	Walter Sterbini	Donata Brischetto	Lanfranco Carnacina	Lina Savoná	Carlo Andreoli
Loredana Bertè	Michele Longo	Mauro Goldsand	Stefania Castelli	Marco Negri	Gina De Boer
Loredana Bertè	Stefano Costa	Marco Rea	Edith Alberts	Alessandro Capasso	Ezio Turchetti

== Blind auditions ==
Blind auditions premiered on 26 November, Each coach must have fifteen artists on their team at the end of the blind auditions. Each coach is given one "block" to use in the entire blind auditions. At the end of the blind auditions, Orietta didn't use block.

Blind auditions color key
✔	Coach pressed "I WANT YOU" button
	Artist defaulted to a coach's team
	Artist elected this coach's team
	Artist eliminated as no coach pressing their button
	The artist was selected for a team in the blind auditions, but was not chosen by his coach to advance to the knockouts.
✘	Coach pressed "I WANT YOU" button, but was blocked by Orietta
✘	Coach pressed "I WANT YOU" button, but was blocked by Clementino
✘	Coach pressed "I WANT YOU" button, but was blocked by Gigi
✘	Coach pressed "I WANT YOU" button, but was blocked by Loredana

Blind auditions results
Episode	Order	Artist	Song	Coaches' and artist's choices			
Episode	Order	Artist	Song	Orietta	Clementino	Gigi	Loredana
Episode 1 (26 November)	1	Ida Lertora	"Oggi sono io"	✔	✔	✔	-
Episode 1 (26 November)	2	Walter Sterbini	"Cambiare"	✔	✔	✔	✔
Episode 1 (26 November)	3	Carlo Andreoli	"Sultans of Swing"	✔	✔	✔	✔
Episode 1 (26 November)	4	Piero Cotto & Beatrice Pasquali	"Grazie Perché"	✔	✔	✔	✔
Episode 1 (26 November)	5	Maria Gatti	"Your Love"	✔	✔	-	-
Episode 1 (26 November)	6	Benedetta Laurá	"Mille"	-	-	-	-
Episode 1 (26 November)	7	Claudia Arvati	"Mentre tutto score"	✔	✔	✔	✔
Episode 1 (26 November)	8	Eddie Oliva	"A rumba de scugnizzi"	✔	✔	✔	✔
Episode 1 (26 November)	9	Daniele Conti	"La leva calcistica del '68"	-	-	-	-
Episode 1 (26 November)	10	Russell Russell	"Disco Inferno"	✔	✔	✔	-
Episode 1 (26 November)	11	Rossella Boni	"Un'emozione da poco"	✔	✔	-	-
Episode 1 (26 November)	12	Vittorio Bonetti	"A muso duro"	-	✔	✔	-
Episode 1 (26 November)	13	Rosa Giannoccaro	"E salutala per me"	✔	-	-	-
Episode 2 (3 December)	1	Franco Tortora	"La donna del mio amico"	✔	✔	✔	✔
Episode 2 (3 December)	2	Marcella Di Pasquale	"Eppur mi sono scordato di te"	✔	✔	✔	✔
Episode 2 (3 December)	3	Annibale Giannarelli	"Just the Way You Are"	✔	✔	✔	✔
Episode 2 (3 December)	4	Marco Urbisci	"Spider-Man"	-	-	-	-
Episode 2 (3 December)	5	Stefania Castelli	"Sally"	✔	✔	✔	✔
Episode 2 (3 December)	6	Ezio Turchetti	"Zitti e buoni"	✔	✔	✔	✔
Episode 2 (3 December)	7	Fabrizio Pausini	"Ed io, tra di voi"	✔	✔	✔	✔
Episode 2 (3 December)	8	Tony Bonacina	"Speedy Gonzales"	-	-	-	-
Episode 2 (3 December)	9	Lina Savonà	"Una miniera"	-	✔	✔	✔
Episode 2 (3 December)	10	Giuseppe Mariniello	"Jerusalema"	-	✔	✔	-
Episode 2 (3 December)	11	Cosetta Gigli	"Tu che m’hai preso il cuor"	✔	✔	-	-
Episode 2 (3 December)	12	Michele Longo	"Have You Ever Seen the Rain?"	-	✔	✔	✔
Episode 2 (3 December)	13	Lalo Cibelli	"Futura"	✔	✔	✔	-
Episode 3 (10 December)	1	Carmen Marchese	"Urlo e non mi senti"	✔	✔	✔	✔
Episode 3 (10 December)	2	Mauro Goldsand	"Via con me"	✔	✔	✔	✔
Episode 3 (10 December)	3	Diva Agata Mogiovi	"What's Up?"	✔	✔	✔	-
Episode 3 (10 December)	4	Roberto Barocelli	"Cinque giorni"	✔	✔	✔	✔
Episode 3 (10 December)	5	Xin Xu	"Nel blu dipinto di blu"	✔	✔	-	-
Episode 3 (10 December)	6	Donata Brischetto	"Easy Lady"	✔	✔	✘	✔
Episode 3 (10 December)	7	Santo Caccamo	"La vita com’è"	-	-	-	-
Episode 3 (10 December)	8	Luciano Genovesi	"Easy"	-	✔	✔	✘
Episode 3 (10 December)	9	Antonia Gagliano	"Dove sta Zazà"	-	✔	-	-
Episode 3 (10 December)	10	Gino Caiafa	"I've Got You Under My Skin"	✔	✔	✔	-
Episode 3 (10 December)	11	Eva Pallota	"Gli uomini non cambiano"	-	-	-	-
Episode 3 (10 December)	12	Marco Negri	"Pescatore"	-	✔	-	✔
Episode 4 (17 December)	1	Barbara Errico	"Canto (anche se sono stonato)"	✔	✔	✔	✔
Episode 4 (17 December)	2	Daniele Montenero	"Tutto questo sei tu"	✔	✔	✔	✔
Episode 4 (17 December)	3	Arthur Miles	"What a wolderful world"	✔	✔	✔	✘
Episode 4 (17 December)	4	Stefania Corona	"I'm Outta Love"	-	-	-	-
Episode 4 (17 December)	5	Matteo Schiavone	"La voce del silenzio"	✔	✔	-	✔
Episode 4 (17 December)	6	Gina De Boer	"Piece of my heart"	✔	-	✔	✔
Episode 4 (17 December)	7	Paola Pompei	"L' amore si odia"	✔	-	✔	-
Episode 4 (17 December)	8	Fiorella Ferri	"Amore disperato"	-	-	-	-
Episode 4 (17 December)	9	Adriano Gradi	"Strada facendo"	-	✔	✔	-
Episode 4 (17 December)	10	Lorenzo Roscio	"Une Belle Histoire"	-	-	-	-
Episode 4 (17 December)	11	Laura Landi	"Un'aventtura"	-	✔	✔	-
Episode 4 (17 December)	12	Angelo De Niro	"Don't you (forget about me)"	✔	✔	✔	✔
Episode 4 (17 December)	13	Giacomo Sebastiani	"Rinasceró, rinascerai"	✔	-	-	-
Episode 4 (17 December)	14	Fabrizio Fierro	"Knock on wood"	-	✔	-	-
Episode 5 (23 December)	1	Stefano Costa	"Hallelujah"	✔	✔	✔	✔
Episode 5 (23 December)	2	Emma Armetta	"Io che amo solo te"	✔	-	-	✔
Episode 5 (23 December)	3	Didi Balboni	"Il tempo di morire"	-	-	-	-
Episode 5 (23 December)	4	Marco Rea	"Unchain my heart"	✔	✔	✔	✔
Episode 5 (23 December)	5	Oscar Luigi Cecovig	"Viceversa"	✔	✔	✔	-
Episode 5 (23 December)	6	Edith Alberts	"Diamonds are girl's best friend"	-	✔	-	✔
Episode 5 (23 December)	7	Paolo Benedetti	"Meraviglioso"	-	✔	-	-
Episode 5 (23 December)	8	Stefano Nosei	"You've got a friend"	✔	✔	✔	✔
Episode 5 (23 December)	9	Teresa Moudado	"Bruci la città"	-	-	-	-
Episode 5 (23 December)	10	Eugenia Munari	"A città 'e pulecenella"	✔	-	-	✔
Episode 5 (23 December)	11	Alessandro Capasso	"Get back"	-	✔	-	✔
Episode 5 (23 December)	12	Ermanno Bono	"Più bella cosa"	-	-	-	-
Episode 5 (23 December)	13	Angelo Elli	"La vie en rose"	-	✔	-	-
Episode 6 (7 January)
Episode 6 (7 January)	1	Liza Lipari	"Accidenti a te"	-	-	-	-
Episode 6 (7 January)	2	Remo Tedesco	"Yes I know my way"	✔	✔	-	-
Episode 6 (7 January)	3	Massimo Rastrelli	"Arrogante"	-	-	-	-
Episode 6 (7 January)	4	Lanfranco Carnacina	"Knockin' On Heaven's Door"	-	✔	✔	✔
Episode 6 (7 January)	5	Rommy	"É la mia vita"	✔	✔	-	Team full
Episode 6 (7 January)	6	Vanna D'Ambrosio	"Nessun dolore"	Team full	✔	✔	Team full
Episode 6 (7 January)	7	Luisa Malafarina	"La notte"	Team full	-	✔	Team full
Episode 6 (7 January)	8	Pino Pugelli	"Smoke on the water"	Team full	✔	✔	Team full
Episode 6 (7 January)	9	Rodolfo Banchelli	"La mia banda suona il rock"	Team full	Team full	-	Team full
Episode 6 (7 January)	10	Mimmo Santi	"Tutto il resto é noia"	Team full	Team full	-	Team full
Episode 6 (7 January)	11	Liliana Tambornini	"These Boots Are Made for Walkin'"	Team full	Team full	✔	Team full

== Knockouts ==
In this round, where also labelled as the "semi-finals", each coach groups his/her artists into two groups of three. Each coach can advance one or two artists to the final phase. At the end of each round, three artists per team will advance to the finals.

Artist won the Knockout and advanced to the Final
Artist lost the Knockout and was eliminated

Episode	Coach	Order	Artist	Song	Result
Episode 7 (14 January)	Loredana Bertè	1	Michele Longo	"Per colpa di chi?"	Eliminated
Episode 7 (14 January)	Loredana Bertè	2	Donata Brischetto	"Nell'aria"	Advanced
Episode 7 (14 January)	Loredana Bertè	3	Walter Sterbini	"Sere nere"	Advanced
Episode 7 (14 January)	Gigi D'Alessio	4	Annibale Giannarelli	"L'immensità"	Advanced
Episode 7 (14 January)	Gigi D'Alessio	5	Carmen Marchese	"Vivimi"	Eliminated
Episode 7 (14 January)	Gigi D'Alessio	6	Claudia Arvati	"(You Make Me Feel Like) A Natural Woman"	Advanced
Episode 7 (14 January)	Clementino	7	Vittorio Bonetti	"Azzurro"	Eliminated
Episode 7 (14 January)	Clementino	8	Marcella Di Pasquale	"La casa del sole"	Advanced
Episode 7 (14 January)	Clementino	9	Russell Russell	"All Night Longo (All Night)"	Advanced
Episode 7 (14 January)	Orietta Berti	10	Franco Tortora	"Se bruciasse la città"	Advanced
Episode 7 (14 January)	Orietta Berti	11	Rosa Giannoccaro	"Estate"	Eliminated
Episode 7 (14 January)	Orietta Berti	12	Cosetta Gigli	"Con te partirò"	Advanced
Episode 7 (14 January)	Gigi D'Alessio	13	Piero Cotto & Beatrice Pasquali	"You Make Me Fell Brand New"	Advanced
Episode 7 (14 January)	Gigi D'Alessio	14	Lalo Cibelli	"Che vita meravigliosa"	Eliminated
Episode 7 (14 January)	Gigi D'Alessio	15	Fabrizio Pausini	"La Boheme"	Eliminated
Episode 7 (14 January)	Loredana Bertè	16	Carlo Andreoli	"Balliamo sul mondo"	Eliminated
Episode 7 (14 January)	Loredana Bertè	17	Lina Savonà	"Una ragione di più"	Eliminated
Episode 7 (14 January)	Loredana Bertè	18	Lanfranco Carnacina	"When A Man Loves A Woman"	Advanced
Episode 7 (14 January)	Orietta Berti	19	Daniele Montenero	"Sognami"	Eliminated
Episode 7 (14 January)	Orietta Berti	20	Maria Gatti	"Senza catene (Unchained Melody)"	Eliminated
Episode 7 (14 January)	Orietta Berti	21	Roberto Barocelli	"I migliori anni della nostra vita"	Advanced
Episode 7 (14 January)	Clementino	22	Arthur Miles	"Stand By Me"	Eliminated
Episode 7 (14 January)	Clementino	23	Luciano Genovesi	"L'isola che non c'è"	Advanced
Episode 7 (14 January)	Clementino	24	Pino Puggelli	"I Was Made For Lovin'You"	Eliminated

== Final ==
The final was broadcast on 21 January 2022. In the first phase of the final, the twelve talents who reached the final must perform a cover assigned by their coach. At the end of the first phase, only four, from any team, will advance on the second phase of the final. At the end of the second and final phase, the winner of the second edition of The Voice Senior will be announced.

Cosetta Gigli of Team Orietta will not be present due to injury. She was replaced by Daniele Montero.

Riccardo Cocciante performed this song

Artist advanced to the Super-Final
Artist advanced the Super-Final

Round 1

Order	Coach	Artist	Song (original singer)	Public Votes
1	Clementino	Marcella Di Pasquale	Nel sole (Al Bano)	8,67%
2	Loredana Bertè	Walter Sterbini	Ancora (Eduardo De Crescenzo)	11,98%
3	Gigi D'Alessio	Annibale Giannarelli	My Way (Frank Sinatra)	22,20%
4	Orietta Berti	Franco Tortora	Vent'anni (Massimo Ranieri)	6,42%
5	Gigi D'Alessio	Claudia Arvati	E poi (Giorgia)	11,18%
6	Clementino	Russell Russell	Proud Mary (Creedence Clearwater Revival, Tina Turner version)	6,16%
7	Orietta Berti	Roberto Barocelli	Un senso (Vasco Rossi)	7,44%
8	Loredana Bertè	Lanfranco Carnacina	You Are So Beautiful (Billy Preston/ Joe Cocker)	7,71%
9	Gigi D'Alessio	Piero Cotto e Beatrice Pasquali	Questione di feeling (Riccardo Cocciante e Mina)	8,56%
10	Loredana Bertè	Donata Brischetto	Hot Stuff (Donna Summer)	3,31%
11	Orietta Berti	Silvio Aloisio	Il mondo (Jimmy Fontana)	1,20%
12	Clementino	Luciano Genovesi	Hotel California (Eagles)	5,18%

Round 2

Order	Coach	Artist	Song (original singer)	Public Votes
1	Clementino	Marcella Di Pasquale	La casa del sole (Los Marcellos Ferial, Pooh version)	15,90%
2	Loredana Bertè	Walter Sterbini	Cambiare (Alex Baroni)	18,82%
3	Gigi D'Alessio	Annibale Giannarelli	Lo chiamavano Trinità (Franco Micalizzi)	44,15%
4	Gigi D'Alessio	Claudia Arvati	(You Make Me Feel Like) A Natural Woman (Aretha Franklin)	21,14%
