= The Voice Senior (Italian TV series) season 3 =

The Voice Senior
- Season 3
- Presented by: Antonella Clerici
- Coaches: Gigi D'Alessio; Loredana Bertè; Clementino; Ricchi e Poveri
- Winner: Maria Teresa Reale
- Winning coach: Clementino
- Runner-up: Lisa Manosperti

Release
- Original network: Rai 1
- Original release: 13 January – 3 March 2023

Season chronology
- ← Previous; Season 2

The third season of the Italian singing competition The Voice Senior started to air on 13 January 2023, on Rai 1. All coaches from the previous season returned except for Orietta Berti, who has been replaced by Ricchi e Poveri, joining Loredana Bertè, Clementino and Gigi D'Alessio.

Antonella Clerici is the host of the programme.

Maria Teresa Reale was announced as the winner, marking Clementino's first victory as coach and the first victory by a woman on the program.

== Coaches ==
The Voice Senior season 3 coaches

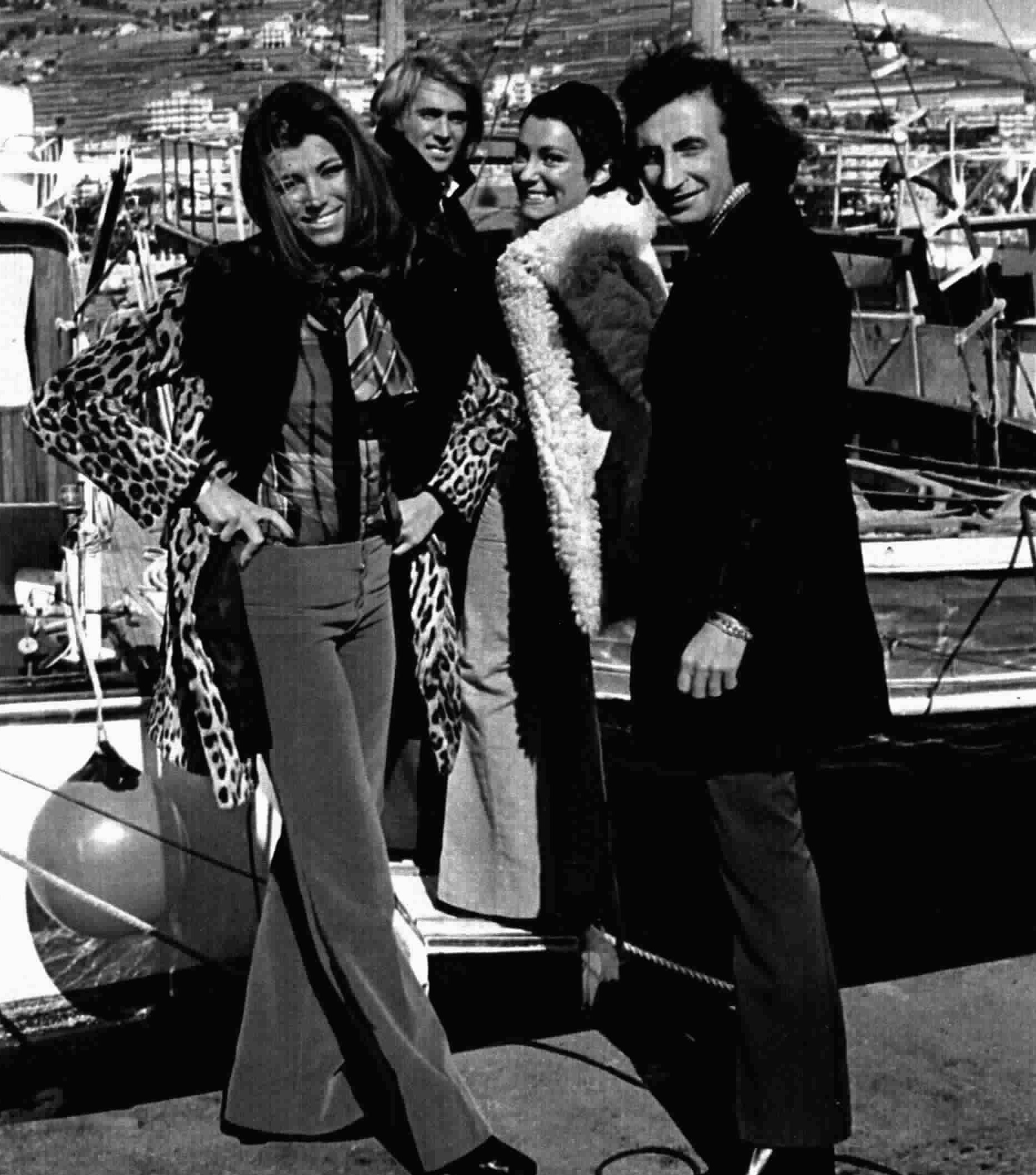
Ricchi e Poveri

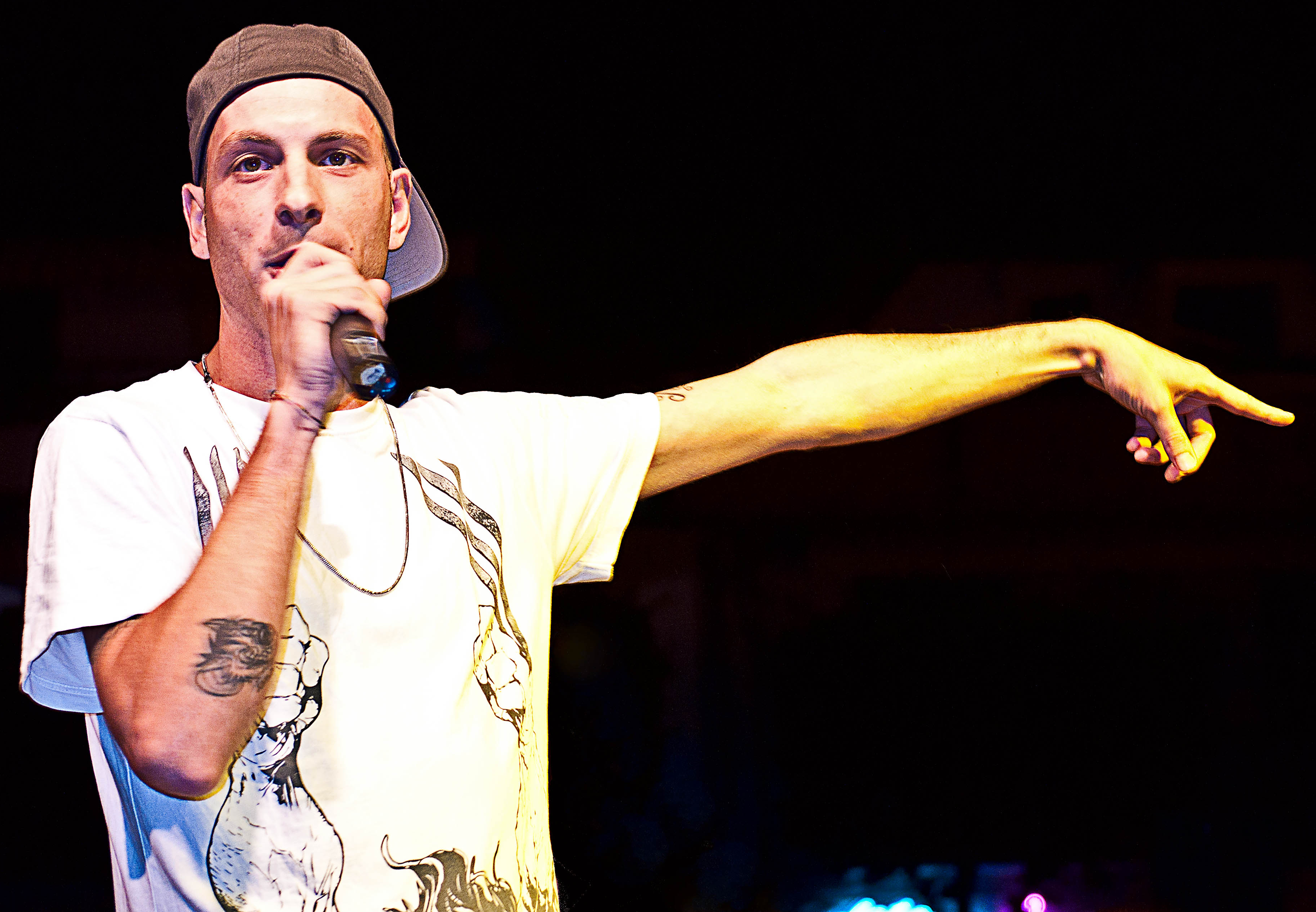
Clementino

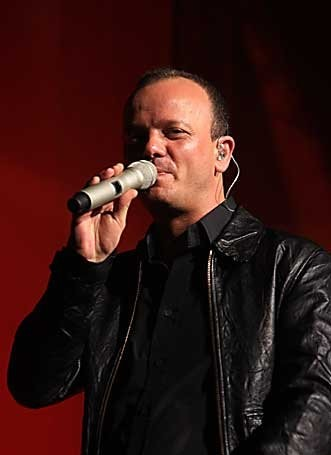
Gigi D'Alessio

Loredana Bertè

In December 2022, Rai 1 announces that The Voice Senior would be back on screen for its third season. In the same periodo, announced that Ricchi e Poveri would be the new coaches for the upcoming season, replacing Orietta Berti.

== Teams ==
- Winner
- Runner-up
- Third place
- Fourth place
- Eliminated in the Final
- Eliminated in the Knockouts
- Eliminated in the Best of six

Coaches	Top 48 artists			
Ricchi & Poveri	Emilio Paolo Piluso	Mario Aiudi	Stefano Borgia	Sergio Moltoni
Ricchi & Poveri	Fabrizio Crico	Augusta Procesi	Luciano Capurro	Morena Rosini
Ricchi & Poveri	Mary Carmen Scerri	Giulia Crocini	Amelia Milella	Laura Triesto
Clementino	Maria Teresa Reale	Alex Sure	Minnie Minoprio	Sebastiano Procida
Clementino	Peppe Quintale	Luigi Raguseo	Annamaria Bianchi	Lauro Attardi e Gabriele Iaconis
Clementino	Marco Manusso	Mario Insegna	Teresa Laurita	Fabio Fortini
Gigi D'Alessio	Marco Rancati	Lisa Maggio	Claudio Morosi	Annalisa Beretta
Gigi D'Alessio	Gianni Conte	Giuseppe Izzillo	Tatiana Paggini	Anna "Ondina" Sannino
Gigi D'Alessio	Franco Rangone	Dario Gay	Carmelo Castobello	Adele Monia Cinquegrana
Loredana Bertè	Lisa Manosperti	Ronnie Jones	Aida Cooper	Diego Vilardo
Loredana Bertè	Rosa Alba Pizzo	Rossella Coci	Stefano Peli	Rosalba Musolino
Loredana Bertè	Ninni Lo Casto	Roberto Coen	Patrizia Zanetti	Stefania Belli

== Blind auditions ==
Blind auditions premiered on 13 January, each coach must have twelve artists on their team at the end of the blind auditions. Each coach is given one "block" to use in the entire blind auditions. At the end of the blind auditions, Gigi didn't use block.

Blind auditions color key
✔	Coach pressed "I WANT YOU" button
	Artist defaulted to a coach's team
	Artist elected this coach's team
	Artist eliminated as no coach pressing their button
	The artist was selected for a team in the blind auditions, but was not chosen by his coach to advance to the knockouts.
✘	Coach pressed "I WANT YOU" button, but was blocked by Ricchi & Poveri
✘	Coach pressed "I WANT YOU" button, but was blocked by Clementino
✘	Coach pressed "I WANT YOU" button, but was blocked by Gigi
✘	Coach pressed "I WANT YOU" button, but was blocked by Loredana

Blind auditions results
Episode	Order	Artist	Song	Coaches' and artist's choices			
Episode	Order	Artist	Song	Ricchi & Poveri	Clementino	Gigi	Loredana
Episode 1 (13 January)
Episode 1 (13 January)	1	Annalisa Beretta	"Amor mio"	✔	✔	✔	✔
Episode 1 (13 January)	2	Laura Triesto	"Senza un briciolo di testa"	✔	✔	-	-
Episode 1 (13 January)	3	Marco Rancati	"Fai rumore"	✔	✔	✔	✔
Episode 1 (13 January)	4	Lauro Attardi e Gabriele Iaconis	"Mr. Robinson"	-	✔	✔	✔
Episode 1 (13 January)	5	Lisa Manosperti	"Almeno tu nell'universo"	✔	✔	✔	✔
Episode 1 (13 January)	6	Stefano Peli	"Chiamami ancora amore"	✔	✔	✔	✔
Episode 1 (13 January)	7	Diego Vilardo	"Purple Rain"	✔	✔	✔	✔
Episode 1 (13 January)	8	Luciano Capurro	"'O sole mio"	✔	✔	✔	-
Episode 1 (13 January)	9	Sergio Moltoni	"Cambia un uomo"	✔	✔	✔	✔
Episode 1 (13 January)	10	Clara Maria Teresa Serina	"Garota de Ipanema	-	-	-	-
Episode 1 (13 January)	11	Tatiana Paggini	"Riderà"	✔	✔	✔	-
Episode 1 (13 January)	12	Paolo Tarantino	"Apri tutte le porte"	-	-	-	-
Episode 1 (13 January)	13	Amelia Milella	"Lady Marmalade"	✔	✔	-	-
Episode 2 (20 January)	1	Rosa Alba Pizzo	"Bella senz'anima"	✔	✔	✔	✔
Episode 2 (20 January)	2	Emilio Paolo Piluso	"Bella d'estate"	✔	✔	✔	✔
Episode 2 (20 January)	3	Mario Aiudi	"The Lady Is a Tramp"	✔	✔	-	✔
Episode 2 (20 January)	4	Don Bruno Maggioni	"Nessuno mi può giudicare"	-	-	-	-
Episode 2 (20 January)	5	Rosalba Musolino	"Io e te da soli"	✔	✔	✔	✔
Episode 2 (20 January)	6	Sebastiano Procida	"Stayin' Alive"	✔	✔	-	-
Episode 2 (20 January)	7	Anna "Ondina" Sannino	"La voglia la pazzia"	✔	✔	✔	-
Episode 2 (20 January)	8	Alex Sure	"Lamette"	✔	✔	✔	✘
Episode 2 (20 January)	9	Franco Rangone	"Carina"	✔	✔	✔	-
Episode 2 (20 January)	10	Maria Teresa Reale	"Locked Out of Heaven"	✔	✔	✔	✔
Episode 2 (20 January)	11	Farida	"Vedrai, vedrai"	-	-	-	-
Episode 2 (20 January)	12	Peppe Quintale	"Alta marea"	-	✔	-	-
Episode 3 (1° February)
Episode 3 (1° February)	1	Lisa Maggio	"Quando ami una donna"	✔	✔	✔	✔
Episode 3 (1° February)	2	Dario Gay	"Il mare d'inverno"	✔	-	✔	-
Episode 3 (1° February)	3	Ezra Pavan	"Perfect Symphony"	-	-	-	-
Episode 3 (1° February)	4	Rossella Cocci	"Long Train Runnin'"	✔	✔	✔	✔
Episode 3 (1° February)	5	Teresa Laurita	"Bagno a mezzanotte"	-	✔	-	✔
Episode 3 (1° February)	6	Ronnie Jones	"Superstition"	✔	✔	✔	✔
Episode 3 (1° February)	7	Vincenzo Ferrara	"Dieci ragazze"	-	-	-	-
Episode 3 (1° February)	8	Augusta Procesi	"All by Myself"	✔	✔	✔	-
Episode 3 (1° February)	9	Gianni Conte	"Uomini soli"	✔	✔	✔	-
Episode 3 (1° February)	10	Giulia Crocini	"Maracaibo"	✔	✔	-	-
Episode 3 (1° February)	11	Ninni Lo Casto	"Ne me quitte pas"	✔	✔	✔	✔
Episode 4 (3 February)
Episode 4 (3 February)	1	Giuseppe Izzillo	"New York, New York"	✔	✔	✔	✔
Episode 4 (3 February)	2	Mary Carmen Scerri	"Fortissimo"	✔	-	-	✔
Episode 4 (3 February)	3	Carmelo Castobello	"Chiedi chi erano i Beatles"	-	✔	✔	-
Episode 4 (3 February)	4	Minnie Minoprio	"Careless Whisper"	✔	✔	✔	✔
Episode 4 (3 February)	5	Aida Cooper	"Non farti cadere le braccia"	✔	✔	✘	✔
Episode 4 (3 February)	6	Annamaria Bianchi	"La vie en rose"	✔	✔	✔	✔
Episode 4 (3 February)	7	Giuseppe Blonna	"Attenti al lupo"	-	-	-	-
Episode 4 (3 February)	8	Fabio Fortini	"Light My Fire"	-	✔	-	-
Episode 4 (3 February)	9	Adele Monia Cinquegrana	"A chi"	✔	-	✔	-
Episode 4 (3 February)	10	Mario Insegna	"You Never Can Tell"	✔	✔	-	-
Episode 4 (3 February)	11	Stefano Borgia	"Portati via"	✔	✔	✘	-
Episode 4 (3 February)	12	Patrizia Capone	"Tutt'al più"	-	-	-	-
Episode 4 (3 February)	13	Roberto Coen	"Try a Little Tenderness"	✔	✔	-	✔
Episode 5 (17 February)
Episode 5 (17 February)	1	Marco Manusso	"Titanic"	-	✔	-	✔
Episode 5 (17 February)	2	Patrizia Zanetti	"Non ti scordar mai di me"	-	-	-	✔
Episode 5 (17 February)	3	Maurizio Tassani	"Caruso"	-	-	-	-
Episode 5 (17 February)	4	Fabrizio Crico	"Baby Jane"	✔	✔	-	-
Episode 5 (17 February)	5	Luigi Raguseo	"Should I Stay or Should I Go"	✔	✔	✔	✔
Episode 5 (17 February)	6	Claudio Morosi	"Senza una donna"	✔	Team full	✔	✔
Episode 5 (17 February)	7	Carmela Testini	"50mila"	-	Team full	Team full	-
Episode 5 (17 February)	8	Morena Rosini	"Out Here on My Own"	✔	Team full	Team full	✔
Episode 5 (17 February)	9	Monica Bordino	"Torna a casa"	Team full	Team full	Team full	-
Episode 5 (17 February)	10	Stefania Belli	"Ho amato tutto"	Team full	Team full	Team full	✔
