= The Voice Senior (Italian TV series) =

Reality singing competition TV show

- Genre: Reality television
- Created by: John de Mol
- Developed by: Talpa Content
- Presented by: Antonella Clerici
- Judges: Al Bano and Jasmine Carrisi; Clementino; Gigi D'Alessio; Loredana Bertè; Orietta Berti; Ricchi e Poveri; Arisa; Nek; Rocco Hunt; Fiorella Mannoia
- Country of origin: Italy
- Original language: Italian
- No. of seasons: 7
- No. of episodes: 35

Production
- Producers: Fremantle; ITV Studios

Original release
- Network: Rai 1 HD; Rai Premium (renuns)
- Release: 27 November 2020 – present

Related
- The Voice of Italy; The Voice Kids; The Voice Generations; The Voice (franchise)

The Voice Senior is an Italian reality singing competition for elders of more than 60 years old, and a senior version of The Voice of Italy. The series is produced by Rai 2 after acquiring the show from the original Holland version, making Italy the 12th country to start producing The Voice Senior. The show began airing on November 27, 2020.

The first coaches were Gigi D'Alessio, Clementino, Loredana Bertè and the duo Al Bano & Jasmine Carrisi. The host of the show is Antonella Clerici. On 16 July 2021, it announced that the second season would be produced with Orietta Berti announced as the new coach, replacing Al Bano & Jasmine Carrisi. The third season of the reality show premiered on 13 January 2023, with Ricchi e Poveri replacing Orietta. The fourth season premiered on 16 February 2024, with Arisa replacing Ricchi e Poveri. The fifth season premiered in early 2025 with the entire cast from the fourth season, while the sixth season premiered in the latter portion of 2025 with Arisa, Bertè, Clementino as a duo coach with Rocco Hunt, and Nek replacing D'Alessio. The seventh season premiered in late 2026 with Fiorella Mannoia replacing Bertè, while Arisa, Clementino & Hunt, and Nek returning as coaches.

== Coaches and host ==
=== Coaches ===
In October 2020 it was announced that Gigi D'Alessio from the adult version of the show, Clementino, and Loredana Bertè will be the coaches for the first season of the show. On the same day, it was announced that Al Bano would coach with his daughter, Jasmine Carrisi, as a duo coach. On 16 July 2021, it was announced that Orietta Berti would replace Al Bano and Jasmine for season two. Duo Ricchi e Poveri replaced Berti in season three. For the fourth season, Arisa debuted as a coach, replacing Richhi e Poveri. The entire cast from the fourth season returned for the fifth season. The sixth season premiered in the latter portion of 2025 with Arisa and Bertè returning as solo coaches, Clementino as a duo coach with Rocco Hunt, and Nek replacing D'Alessio. The seventh season will begin airing in the latter portion of 2026 with Clementino & Hunt, Arisa, and Nek returning as coaches, and Fiorella Mannoia replacing Berté, who departed for the season due to her schedule and contractual obligations, but she continued to be a coach in the children’s version.

Coaches	Season						
Coaches	1	2	3	4	5	6	7
Clementino^{1}							
Gigi D'Alessio							
Loredana Bertè							
Al Bano and Jasmine Carrisi							
Orietta Berti							
Ricchi e Poveri							
Arisa							
Rocco Hunt^{1}							
Nek							
Fiorella Mannoia							

- ^1 Clementino and Rocco Hunt were a duo coach in the sixth and seventh seasons.
Coaches gallery

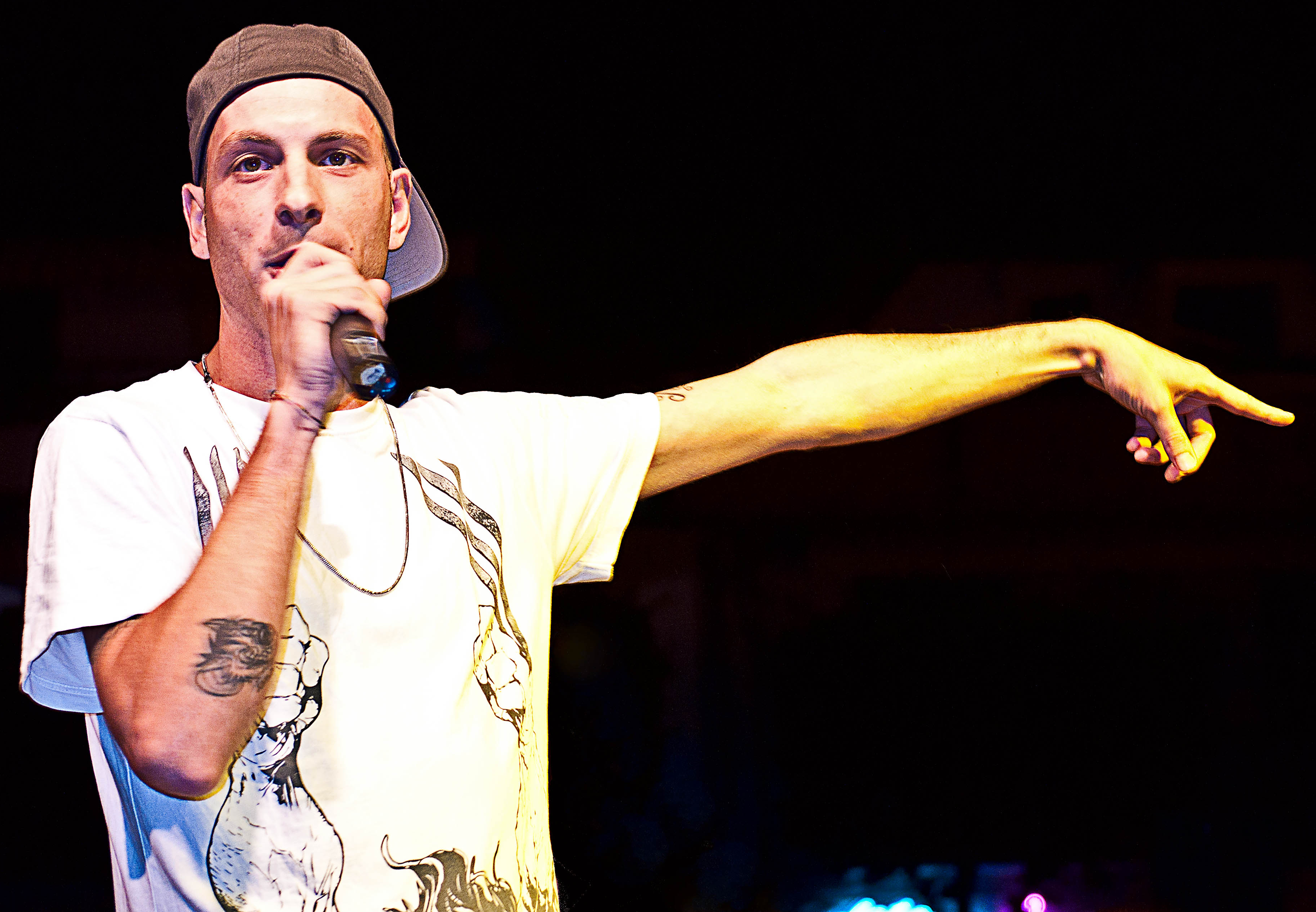
Clementino (solo: 1–5, duo: 6–present)

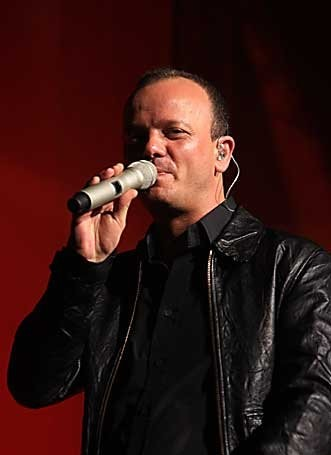
Gigi D'Alessio (1–5)

Loredana Bertè (1–6)

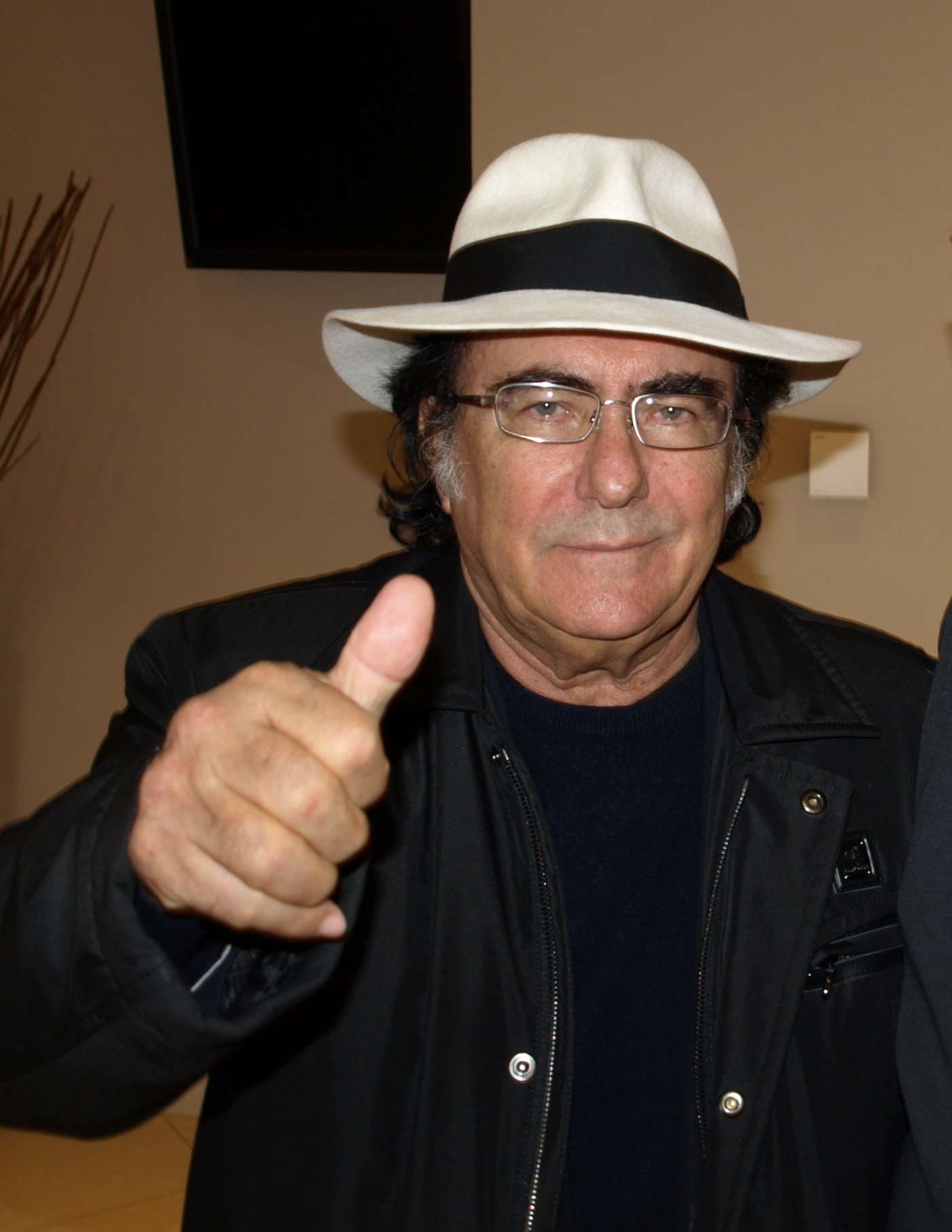
Al Bano (duo: 1)

Jasmine Carrisi (duo: 1)

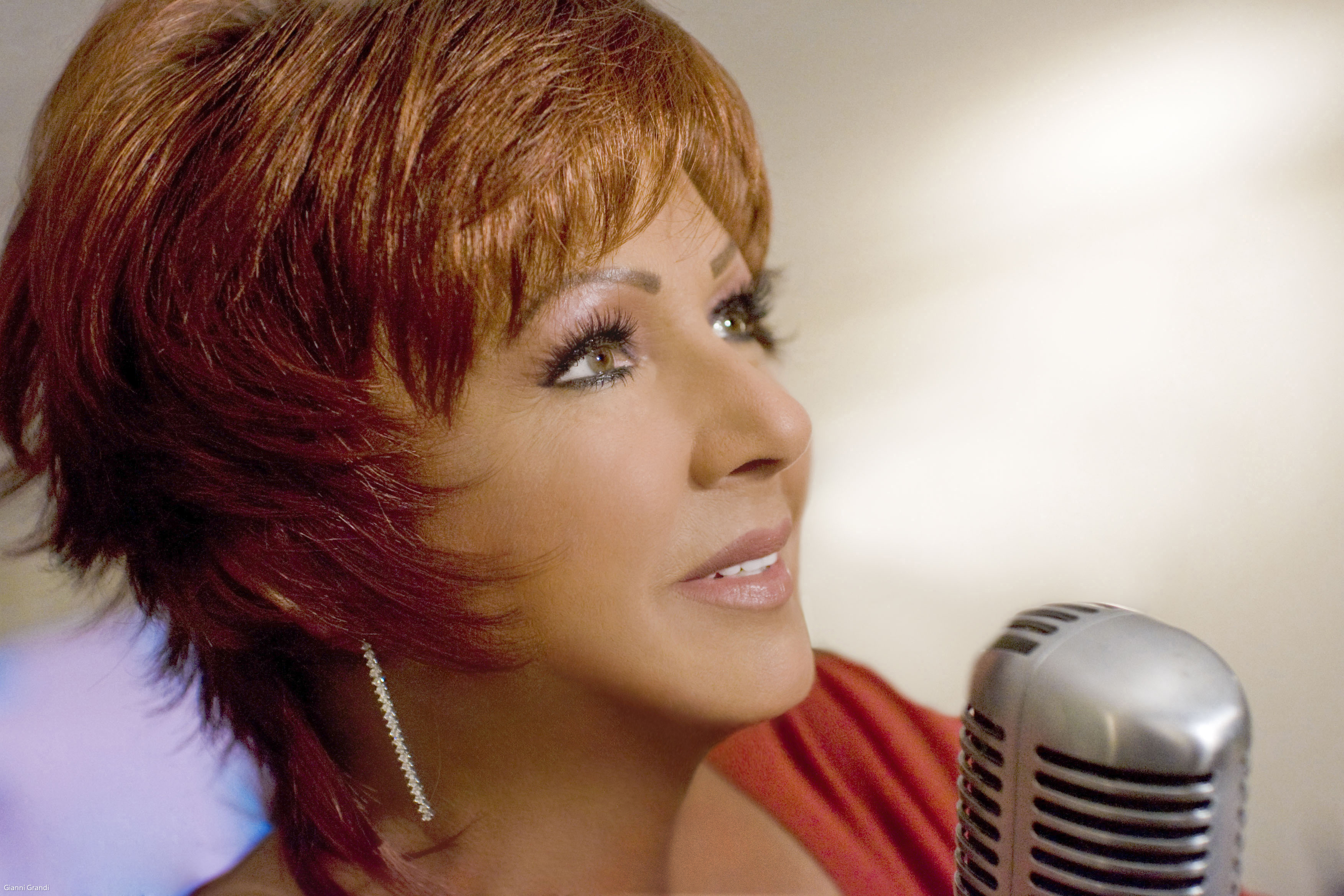
Orietta Berti (2)

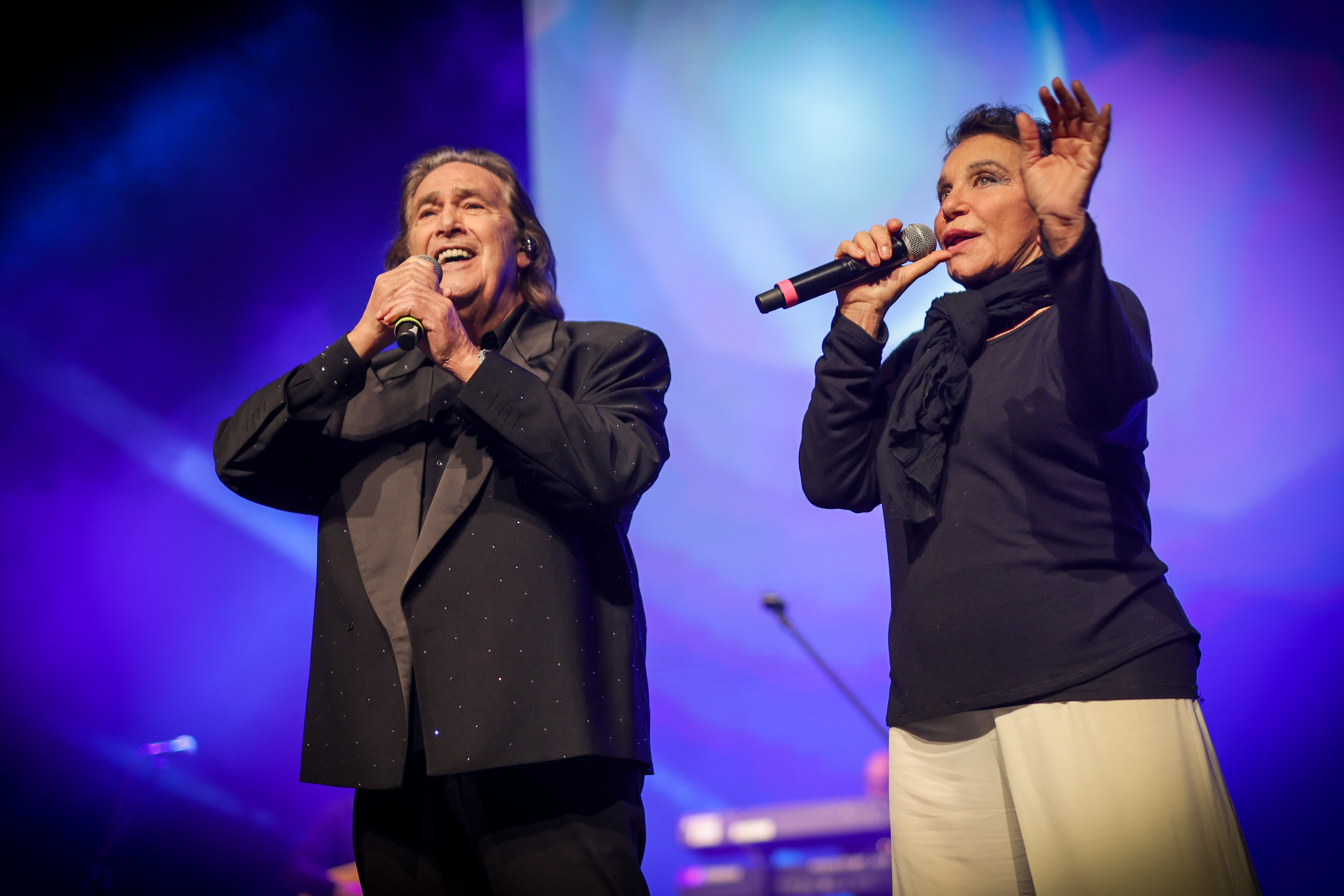
Ricchi e Poveri (duo: 3)

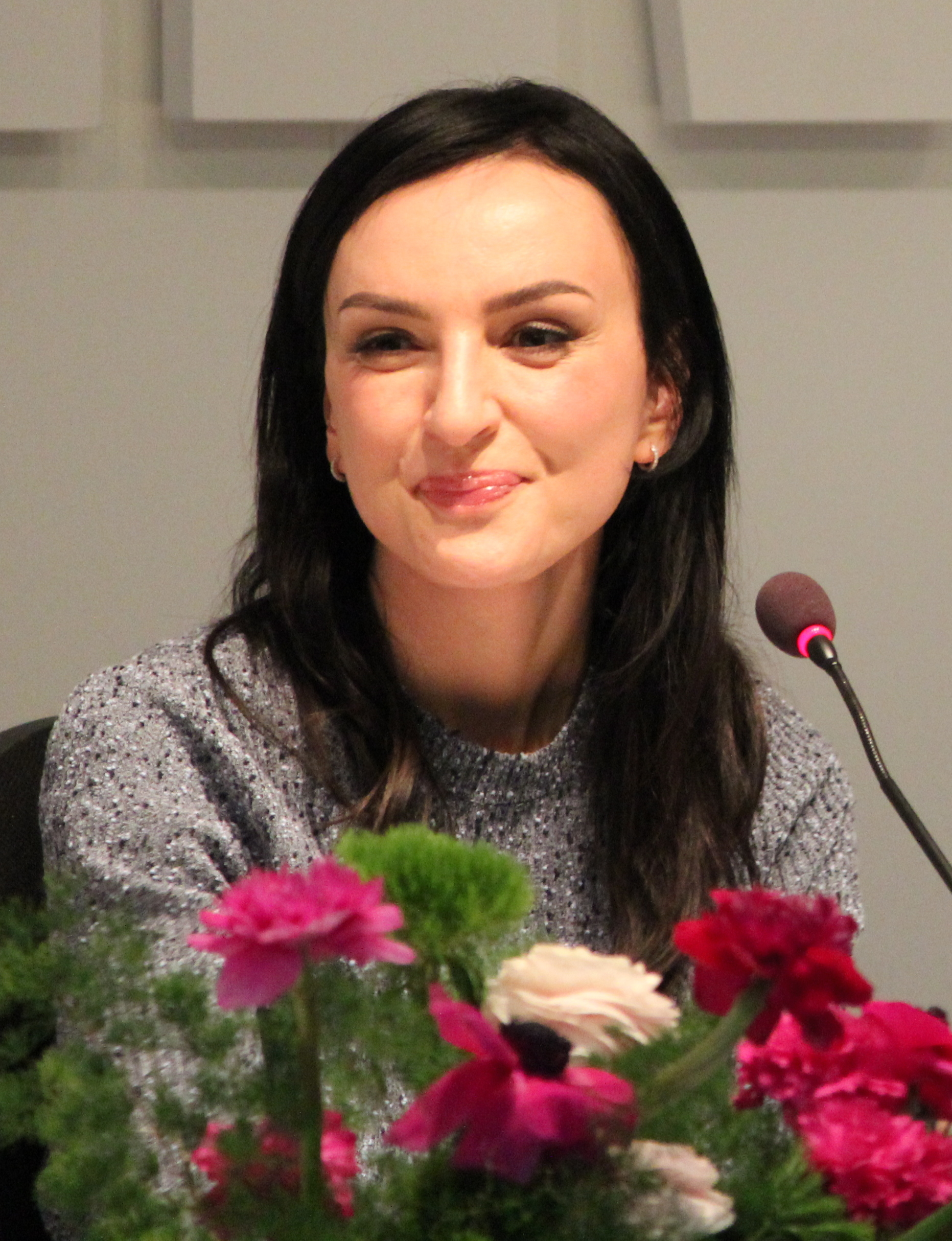
Arisa (4–present)

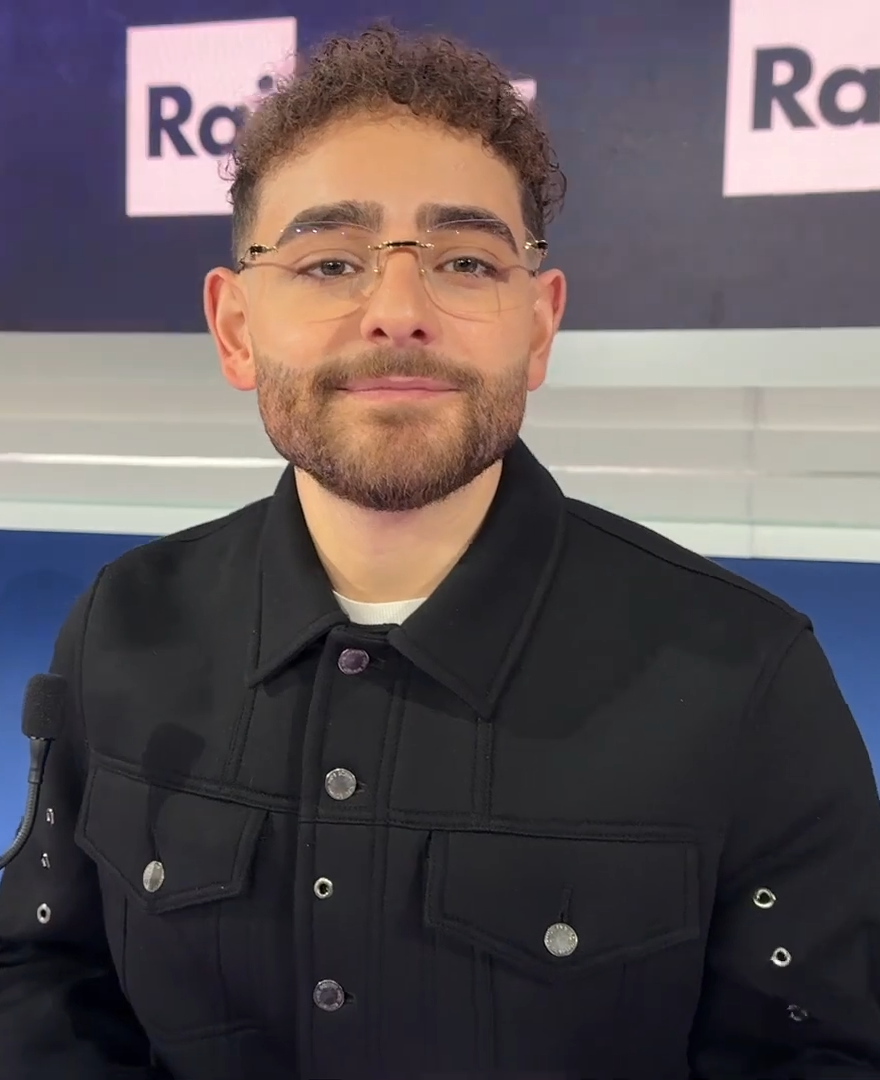
Rocco Hunt (duo: 6–present)

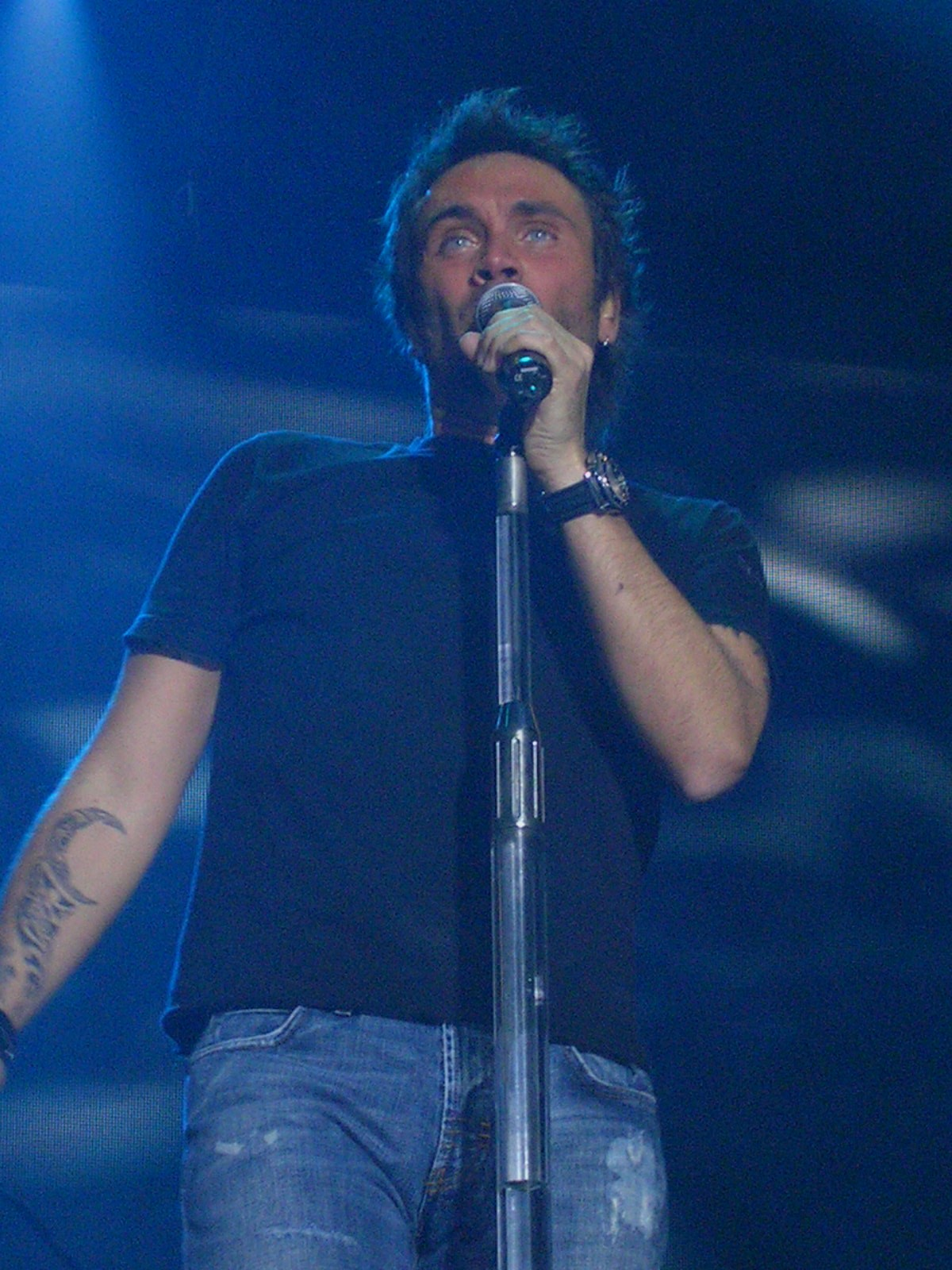
Nek (6–present)

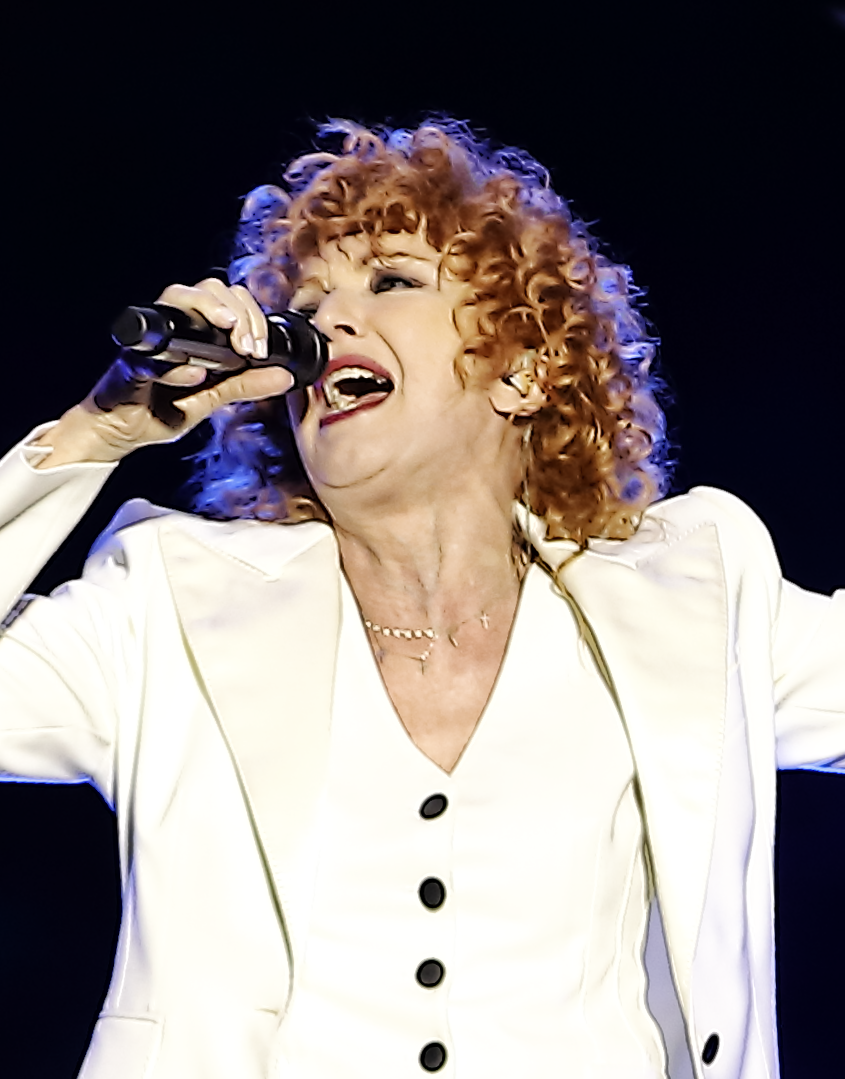
Fiorella Mannoia (7–present)

=== Host ===
It was announced that Antonella Clerici would be the presenter for the first season.

Presenter	Season						
Presenter	1	2	3	4	5	6	7
Antonella Clerici							

Host gallery

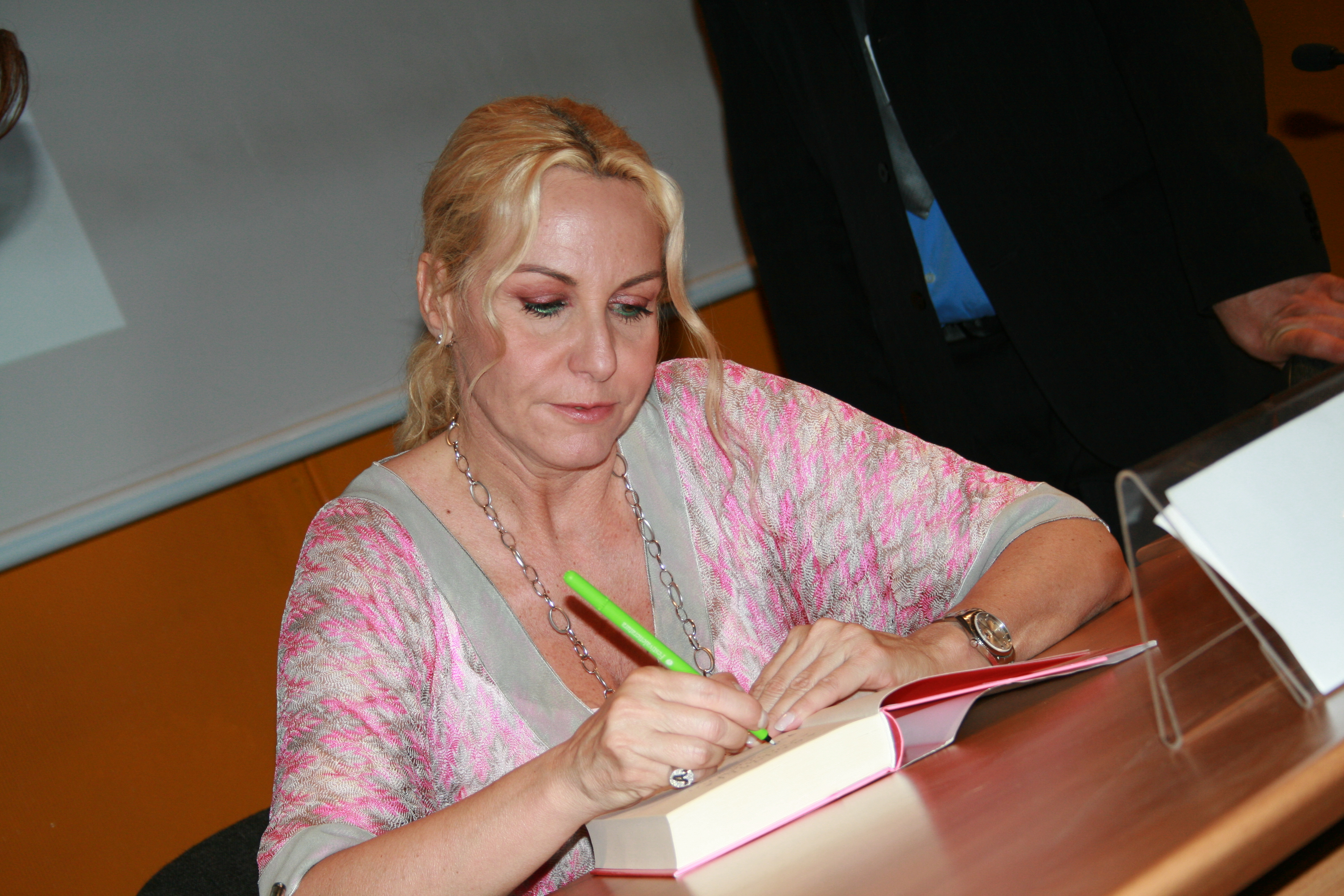
Antonella Clerici

== Coaches and finalists ==
Color key
Winner in bold, finalists in italic.
Winner
Runner-up
Third place
Fourth place

Season	Coaches and their finalists			
1	Al Bano e Jasmine Carrisi	Clementino	Gigi D'Alessio	Loredana Bertè
1	Tony Reale; Rita Mammolotti	Alan Farrington; Roberto Tomasi	Elena Ferretti; Marco Guerzoni	**Erminio Sinni**; Giovanna Sorrentino
2	Orietta Berti	Clementino	Gigi D'Alessio	Loredana Bertè
2	Roberto Barocelli; Franco Tortora; Daniele Montenero	Marcella Di Pasquale; Luciano Genovesi; Russell Russell	**Annibale Giannarelli**; Claudia Arvati; Piero & Beatrice	Walter Sterbini; Donata Brischetto; Lanfranco Carnacina
3	Ricchi e Poveri	Clementino	Gigi D'Alessio	Loredana Bertè
3	Paolo Emilio Piluso; Mario Aiudi; Stefano Borgia	**Maria Teresa Reale**; Alex Sure; Minnie Minoprio	Lisa Maggio; Mario Rancati; Claudio Morosi	Lisa Manosperti; Aida Cooper; Ronnie Jones
4	Arisa	Clementino	Gigi D'Alessio	Loredana Bertè
4	Mario Rosini; Bartolomeo Iossa; Donatella Pandimiglio	Sonia Zanzi; Giuseppe Maragno; Gianluca Calzolari	**Diana Puddu**; Luca Minnelli; Benito Madonia	Vittorio Centrone; Claudia Bruni; Sandro Bertoldini
5	Maura Susanna; Monica Bruno; Danilo Grimeri De Ioannis	Luigi Lusi; Alessandro Acciaro; Luigi Fontana	**Patrizia Conte**; Graziella Marchesi; Luca Birago	Loredana Maiuri; Gianni Petrillo; Paolo Pietroletti
6	Clementino & Rocco Hunt	Arisa	Nek	Loredana Bertè
6	Pierluigi Lunedei; Carmelo Sciplino; Cosimo Ventruti	Giovanna Russo; Sonia Milan; Anna Rossicchi	**Francesco De Siena**; Tiziano Cavaliere; Jacqueline Schweitzer	Gabriella Vai; Francesca De Fazi; Francesca Visentini
7	Clementino & Rocco Hunt	Fiorella Mannoia	Arisa	Nek
7	Giulia Maglione; Giosuè Tortorelli; Rosella Vespignani	Anna Cuomo; Sabrina Brodosi; Fabiana Fraioli	**Giovanni Scribano**; Chantal Guerlement; Francesca Magnelli	Cristina Orsi; Paolo Falchi; Vittorio Gasso

== Series overview ==
The Voice Senior series overview
Season	Aired	Winner	Runner-up	Third place	Fourth place	Winning coach	Presenter	Coaches (chairs' order)			
Season	Aired	Winner	Runner-up	Third place	Fourth place	Winning coach	Presenter	1	2	3	4
1	2020	Erminio Sinni	Elena Ferretti	Marco Guerzoni	Alan Farrington	Loredana Bertè	Antonella Clerici	Al Bano & Jasmine	Clementino	Gigi	Loredana
2	2021–2022	Annibale Giannarelli	Claudia Arvati	Walter Sterbini	Marcella Di Pasquale	Gigi D'Alessio	Antonella Clerici	Orietta	Clementino	Gigi	Loredana
3	2023	Maria Teresa Reale	Lisa Manosperti	Alex Sure	Paolo E. Piluso	Clementino	Antonella Clerici	Ricchi & Poveri	Clementino	Gigi	Loredana
4	2024	Diana Puddu	Mario Rosini	Sonia Zanzi	Luca Minnelli	Gigi D'Alessio	Antonella Clerici	Arisa	Clementino	Gigi	Loredana
5	2025	Patrizia Conte	Maura Susanna	Monica Bruno	Graziella Marchesa	Gigi D'Alessio	Antonella Clerici	Arisa	Clementino	Gigi	Loredana
6	2025	Francesco De Siena	Pierluigi Lunedei	Giovanna Russo	Carmelo Sciplino	Nek	Antonella Clerici	Cleme & Rocco	Arisa	Nek	Loredana
7	2026	Giovanni Scribano	Cristina Orsi	Anna Cuomo	Sabrina Brodosi	Arisa	Antonella Clerici	Cleme & Rocco	Fiorella	Arisa	Nek
