= Cooper Terry =

American-born Italian musician

Cooper Terry (born Vearl Cooper Jr., San Antonio, 1949 – Antioch, California, 1993) was an American-born Italian blues singer, guitarist and harmonica player.

== Biography ==
Cooper was born in San Antonio but he grew up in San Francisco, where he started performing with musicians from the folk blues circuit such as John Lee Hooker and Sonny Terry. In 1972 he moved to Milan, where he recorded his first album, What I Think About America. Cooper's second album, Soul Food Blues was recorded in Zurich with the collaboration of Swiss guitarist Robert Weideli. Over the course of the 1970s, Cooper played a significant role in establishing the Italian blues scene, performing with artists such as Fabio Treves, Franco Cerri, Ronnie Jones and Carey Bell.

In 1980, Cooper married vocalist Aida Castignola. Together they recorded the album Feelin' Good (1983). In 1991, Cooper formed the Nite Life Band with Lillo Rogati (bass), Marco Limido (guitar) and Davide Ravioli (drums). Together they recorded two albums, Stormy Desert (1991) and Tribute to the Blues (1992).

Cooper returned to San Francisco in 1993, where he died following a short illness.

== Discography ==
- What I Think About America (Carosello) - 1972
- Soul Food Blues (Bellaphone) - 1974
- Sunny Funny Blues (Divergo) - 1980
- Feelin' Good (Appaloosa) - 1983 (with Aida Cooper and Blue Phantom Band)
- Stormy Desert (SAAR) - 1991
- Live (Red & Black) - 1991 (with Fabio Treves)
- Tribute to the Blues: Long Time Gone (SAAR) - 1992
- Take a Ride with Cooper T (Blue Flame) - 2002

=== Collaborations ===
- Henri Chaix & Mickey Baker, A Jazz and Blues Digest (Disques Office) – 1976
- VV. AA., Uncle Sam Blues (Blues Encore) – 1996
