= Fabio Treves =

Italian blues musician (born 1949)

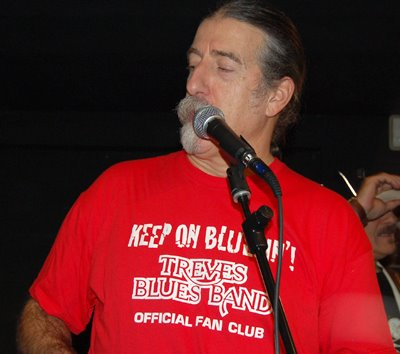
- Fabio Treves

Background information
- Born: Fabio Treves; 27 December 1949 (age 75); Milan, Lombardy, Italy
- Genres: Electric blues, Chicago blues, blues rock
- Occupation(s): Singer, songwriter, harmonicist, bandleader
- Instrument(s): Harmonica, vocals
- Years active: 1975-present
- Labels: Red Record, Spaghetti Record, Mama Barley, Young Record, Buscemi Records, Hi, Folks! Records, CGD, Red & Black, DDD, Verve, Il Manifesto, Zomba Records, EDEL.
- Website: Official website

Fabio Treves (born 27 November 1949) is an Italian blues musician. Treves's nickname is "il Puma di Lambrate" (Lambrate's Cougar), mimicking the British bluesman John Mayall, known as the "Manchester's Lion". Lambrate is the quarter of Milan where Treves grew up.

== Life and career ==
Born and raised in Milan, Fabio Treves became interested in music at a young age, helped by the father's passion for a variety of musical genres, including classical music, jazz, blues, and Portuguese Fado. Treves' interest in music led him to study a wide range of musical instruments, including bass, organ, trumpet, and alto sax. During the 1960s he began playing what would become his signature instrument, the harmonica.

He settled near Milan as a blues harmonica player, inspired by Sonny Terry, Little Walter, Paul Butterfield, Alan Wilson, and Sonny Boy Williamson II.

In 1967, he played with his first band, the Friday Blues Group. He later joined the Simonluca e l'Enorme Maria band, which performed at the Festival di Sanremo in 1972. The following year, he again took part in the Festival, this time as a chorister for Fausto Leali, in the song "La Bandiera di Sole."

In 1974, Treves founded the first Italian blues band, the Treves Blues Band. Soon after, he met the Texan guitarist and harmonicist Cooper Terry after Terry's move to Italy, and the two began a long musical collaboration. During his career, Treves has played with Dave Kelly, Sunnyland Slim, Johnny Shines, Homesick James, Willie Mabon, Billy Branch, Dave Kelly, Paul Jones, Alexis Korner, Bob Margolin, Sam Lay, Louisiana Red, Gordon Smith, Son Seals, and Eddie Boyd. He met Frank Zappa during his Italian visit and remains the only Italian musician to have played with Zappa on stage.

Treves has participated in many music festivals in Italy and around the world. He continues to publish blues music in Italy, having released more than ten albums to date.

His collaborations have reached many levels of Italian music, having has worked with artists including Angelo Branduardi, Pierangelo Bertoli, Eugenio Finardi, Riccardo Cocciante, Mina, and Ivan Graziani, as well as some non-blues collaborations with Articolo 31.

== Discography ==
=== Treves Blues Band ===
- 1975: Treves Blues Band (Red Record)
- 1980: Treves Blues Band & Mike Bloomfield Live (Mama Barley Records, MB 0001)
- 1980: Treves Blues Band 2 (Young Records)
- 1985: Treves Blues Band 3 (Buscemi Records)
- 1996: Treves Blues Band Live! (Red & Black)
- 1999: Jeepster (Red & Black)
- 2001: Blues Again (Red & Black)
- 2004: Bluesfriends (Red & Black)
- 2006: Blues Notes (Red & Black)
- 2008: Live 2008 (Red & Black)
- 2011: "Hey Me Hey Mama" (single) (Red & Black)

=== Solo ===
- 1978: The Country In The City (Red Record)
- 1988: Sunday's Blues (CGD)
- 1991: Fabio Treves & Cooper Terry, "Live" (Red & Black)
- 1992: Jumpin' (DDD)

=== Collaborations ===
- 1979: Blues, Rock & Country Things (Spaghetti Records, ZPLSR 34057)
- 1987: Acoustic in Italy (Hi, Folks Records)
- 1997: Blues Collection (Verve)
- 1998: 2120 "Michigan Avenue, Chicago, Italia" (Il Manifesto)
- 2002: Simply the Blues (Zomba Records)
- 2002: Blues Express (Edel)
