= The Voice Senior (Italian TV series) season 1 =

The Voice Senior
- Season 1
- Presented by: Antonella Clerici
- Coaches: Gigi D'Alessio; Loredana Bertè; Clementino; Al Bano & Jasmine Carrisi
- Winner: Erminio Sinni
- Winning coach: Loredana Bertè
- Runner-up: Elena Ferretti

Release
- Original network: Rai 1
- Original release: 27 November – 20 December 2020

Season chronology
- Next → Season 2

The first season of the Italian singing competition The Voice Senior started to air on 27 November 2020, on Rai 1. The coaches are: Al Bano with his daughter Jasmine, forming the Carrisi couple, Clementino, Gigi D'Alessio and Loredana Bertè.

Antonella Clerici is the host of the programme.

Erminio Sinni was announced as the winner, marking Loredana Bertè's first win as a coach.

== Coaches ==
The Voice Senior season 1 coaches

Loredana Bertè

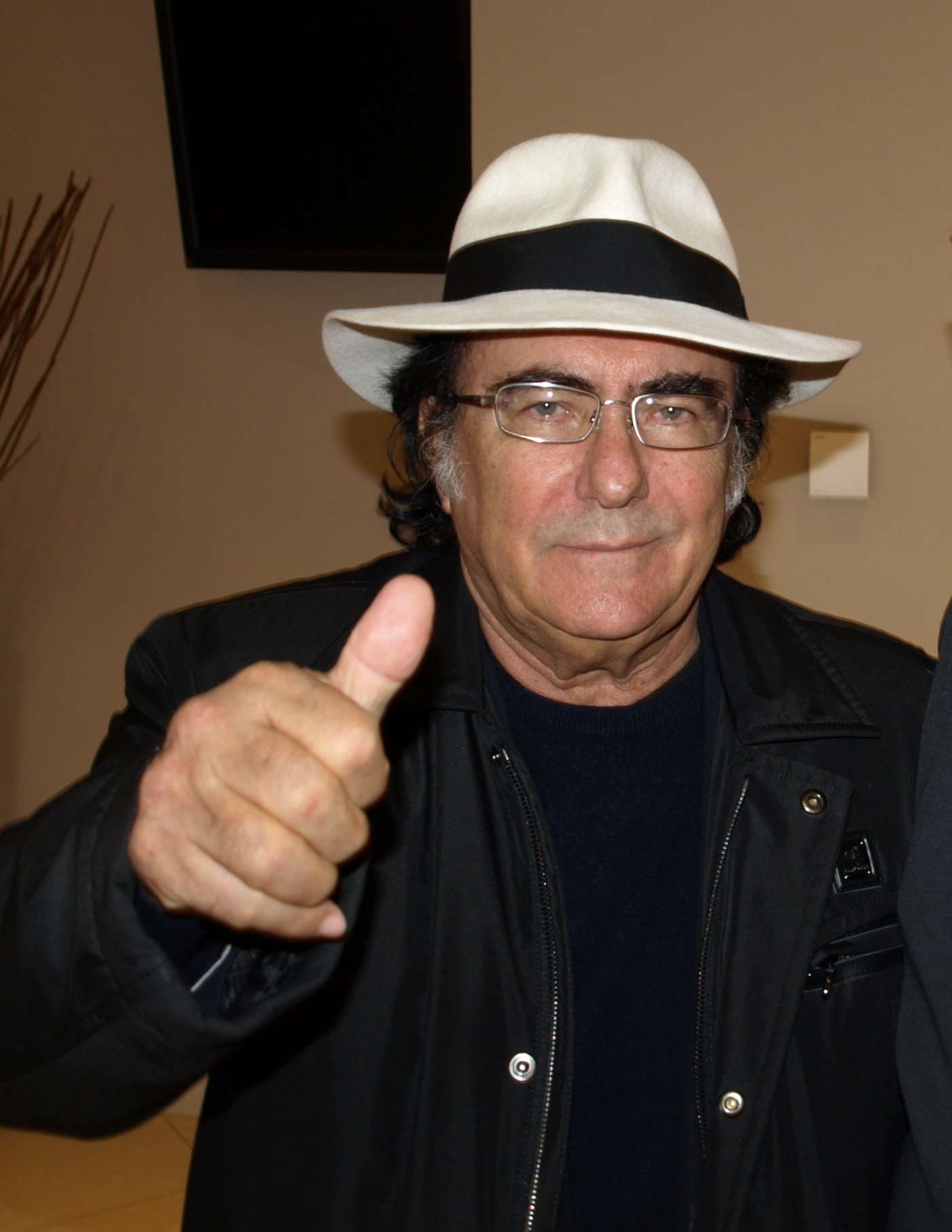
Al Bano

Jasmine Carrisi

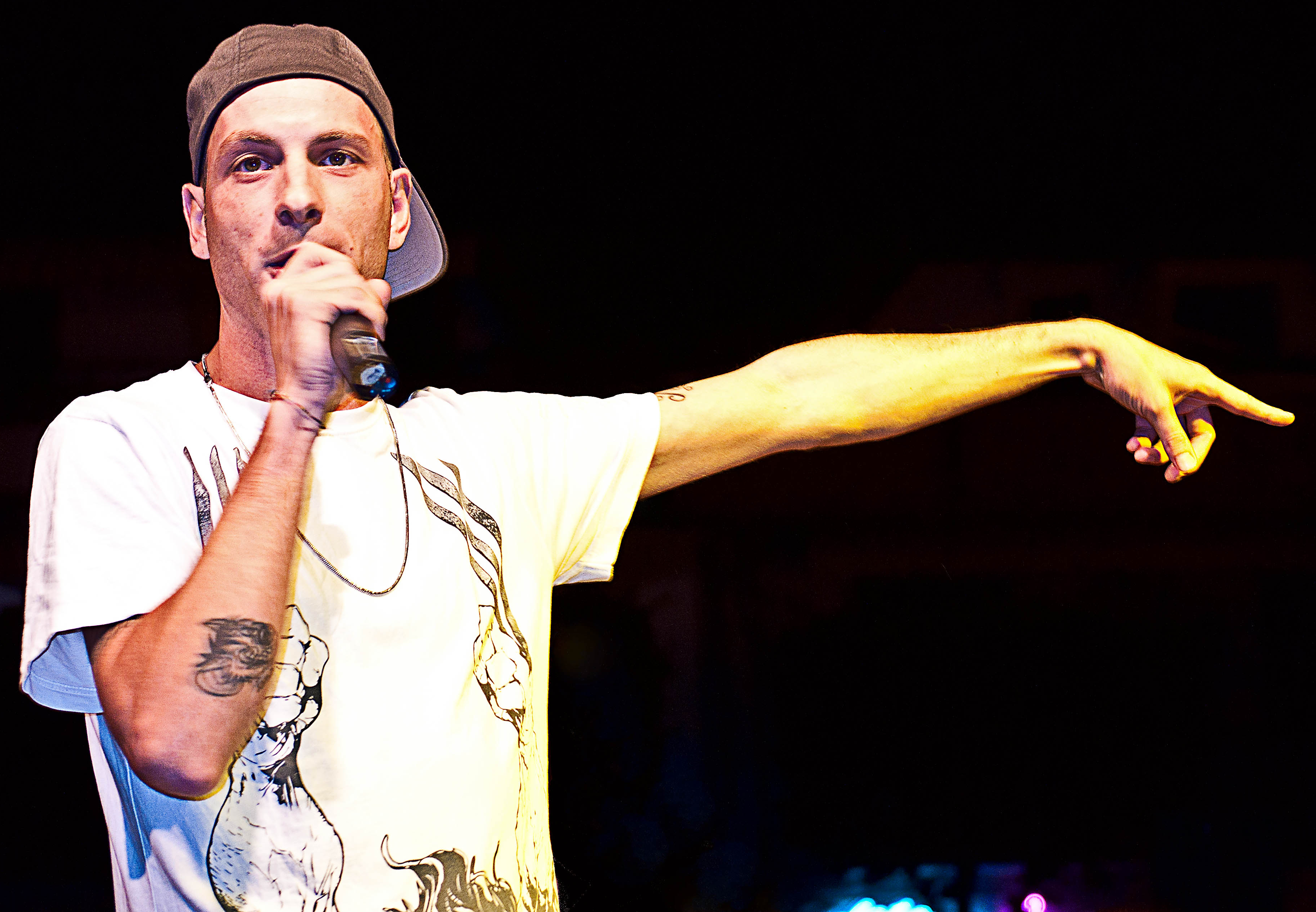
Clementino

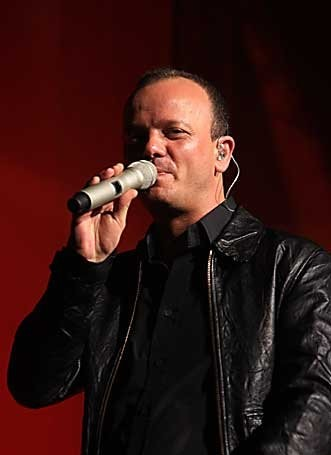
Gigi D'Alessio

In October 2020 it was announced that Gigi D'Alessio, Clementino, and Loredana Bertè will be the coaches for the first season of the show. On the same day, it was announced that Al Bano would coach with his daughter, Jasmine Carrisi, as a duo coach.

== Teams ==
- Winner
- Runner-up
- Third place
- Fourth place
- Eliminated in the Final
- Eliminated in the Knockouts
- Eliminated in the Best of six

Coaches	Top 36 artists				
I Carrisi	Rita Mammolotti	Tony Reale	Gianni Pera	Gennaro Vilardi	Ann Harper
I Carrisi	Alida Ferrarese	Paolo Barabani	Gianni Dego	Ruggero Scandiuzzi	
Clementino	Alan Farrington	Roberto Tomasi	Pietro Dall'Oglio	Michele Lapenna	Ambra Mattioli
Clementino	Franklin Montague	Viviana Stuc	Gigi Epifani	Alfonso Di Berardino	
Gigi D'Alessio	Elena Ferretti	Marco Guerzoni	Laura Grey	Nello Buongiorno	Giancarlo Cajani
Gigi D'Alessio	Perla Trivellini	Rodolfo Maria Gordini	Silvana Lorenzetti	Marco Francini	
Loredana Bertè	Erminio Sinni	Giovanna Sorrentino	Roberta Cappelletti	Giulio Todrani	Laura Fedele
Loredana Bertè	Massimo Vita	Caterina Greco	Emilia Mascolo	Isabella Marelli	

== Blind auditions ==
Blind auditions premiered on 27 November, each coach must have nine artists on their team at the end of the blind auditions. Each coach is given one "block" to use in the entire blind auditions. At the end of the blind auditions, Gigi didn't use block.

Blind auditions color key
✔	Coach pressed "I WANT YOU" button
	Artist defaulted to a coach's team
	Artist elected this coach's team
	Artist eliminated as no coach pressing their button
	The artist was selected for a team in the blind auditions, but was not chosen by his coach to advance to the knockouts.
✘	Coach pressed "I WANT YOU" button, but was blocked by Al Bano & Jasmine
✘	Coach pressed "I WANT YOU" button, but was blocked by Clementino
✘	Coach pressed "I WANT YOU" button, but was blocked by Gigi
✘	Coach pressed "I WANT YOU" button, but was blocked by Loredana

Blind auditions results
Episode	Order	Artist	Song	Coaches' and artist's choices			
Episode	Order	Artist	Song	I Carrisi	Clementino	Gigi	Loredana
Episode 1 (27 November)
Episode 1 (27 November)	1	Giancarlo Cajani	"Uno su mille"	✔	✔	✔	✔
Episode 1 (27 November)	2	Rita Mammolotti	"Sono come tu mi vuoi"	✔	✔	-	✔
Episode 1 (27 November)	3	Viviana Stucchi	"Musica (e il resto scompare)"	✔	✔	-	✔
Episode 1 (27 November)	4	Erminio Sinni	"A mano a mano"	✔	✔	✔	✔
Episode 1 (27 November)	5	Tony Reale	"Just a Gigolo"	✔	✔	-	-
Episode 1 (27 November)	6	Giovanna Sorrentino	"Sola"	✔	✔	✔	✔
Episode 1 (27 November)	7	Pietro Dall'Oglio	"Good Times"	✔	✔	-	-
Episode 1 (27 November)	8	Agata Papiri	"Bésame mucho"	-	-	-	-
Episode 1 (27 November)	9	Elena Ferretti	"Ti sento"	✔	✔	✔	✔
Episode 1 (27 November)	10	Alan Farrington	"Cold Little Heart"	-	✔	✔	✔
Episode 1 (27 November)	11	Riccardo Azzurri	"Via"	-	-	-	-
Episode 1 (27 November)	12	Ann Harper	"The Best"	✔	✔	-	-
Episode 1 (27 November)	13	Laura Grey	"O' surdato 'nnammurato"	-	-	✔	✔
Episode 2 (4 December)
Episode 2 (4 December)	1	Roberto Tomasi	"Fai rumore"	✔	✔	✔	✔
Episode 2 (4 December)	2	Gianni Pera	"Your Song"	✔	✔	-	✘
Episode 2 (4 December)	3	Roberta Cappelletti	"Volevo scriverti da tanto"	✔	✔	✔	✔
Episode 2 (4 December)	4	Ambra Mattioli	"Heroes"	✔	✔	-	-
Episode 2 (4 December)	5	Perla Trivellini	"Sono bugiarda"	-	-	✔	✔
Episode 2 (4 December)	6	Giulio Todrani	"To Love Somebody"	✔	✔	✔	✔
Episode 2 (4 December)	7	Giorgio Biagioli	"Il mondo"	-	-	-	-
Episode 2 (4 December)	8	Michele Lapenna	"Diavolo in me"	-	✔	✔	✔
Episode 2 (4 December)	9	Paolo Barabani	"Su di noi"	✔	✔	-	-
Episode 2 (4 December)	10	Alida Ferrarese	"Torneremo ancora"	✔	✔	✔	✔
Episode 2 (4 December)	11	Rodolfo Maria Gordini	"Grande amore"	✔	✔	✔	✔
Episode 2 (4 December)	12	Silvana Lorenzetti	"I Say a Little Prayer"	-	-	✔	-
Episode 2 (4 December)	13	Caterina Greco	"'A finestra"	-	✔	-	✔
Episode 2 (4 December)	14	Gigi Epifani	"Che colpa abbiamo noi"	-	✔	-	-
Episode 2 (4 December)	15	Laura Fedele	"Paint It Black"	✔	✔	✘	✔
Episode 3 (11 December)
Episode 3 (11 December)	1	Emilia Mascolo	"America"	✔	✔	✔	✔
Episode 3 (11 December)	2	Gianni Dego	"Granada"	✔	-	-	-
Episode 3 (11 December)	3	Ruggero Scandiuzzi	"I tuoi particolari"	✔	✔	-	-
Episode 3 (11 December)	4	Nello Buongiorno	"Io amo"	✔	✔	✔	✔
Episode 3 (11 December)	5	Minnena Stangoni	"Senza fare sul serio"	-	-	-	-
Episode 3 (11 December)	6	Marco Francini	"Meraviglioso"	✔	✔	✔	-
Episode 3 (11 December)	7	Marco Guerzoni	"Are You Gonna Go My Way"	-	-	✔	✔
Episode 3 (11 December)	8	Giovanna Marinuzzi	"Niente da capire"	-	-	Team full	-
Episode 3 (11 December)	9	Franklin Montague	"Could You Be Loved"	-	✔	Team full	✘
Episode 3 (11 December)	10	Gennaro Vilardi	"Tu vuò fà l'americano"	✔	✔	Team full	-
Episode 3 (11 December)	11	Massimo Vita	"Human"	Team full	✔	Team full	✔
Episode 3 (11 December)	12	Isabella Marelli	"It's My Life"	Team full	✔	Team full	✔
Episode 3 (11 December)	13	Alfonso Di Berardino	"Perfect"	Team full	✔	Team full	Team full

== Knockouts ==
In this round, where also labelled as the "semi-finals", each coach groups his/her artists into two groups of three. Each coach can advance one artist to the final phase; at the end of each round, two artists per team will advance to the finals.

Artist won the Knockout and advanced to the Final
Artist lost the Knockout and was eliminated

Episode	Coach	Order	Artist	Song	Result
Episode 4 (18 December)	Loredana Bertè	1	Erminio Sinni	"La sera dei miracoli"	Advanced
Episode 4 (18 December)	Loredana Bertè	2	Laura Fedele	"I say I' sto ccà"	Eliminated
Episode 4 (18 December)	Loredana Bertè	3	Massimo Vita	"Diamante"	Eliminated
Episode 4 (18 December)	I Carrisi	4	Tony Reale	"St. Tropez Twist"	Advanced
Episode 4 (18 December)	I Carrisi	5	Ann Harper	"Ogni volta"	Eliminated
Episode 4 (18 December)	I Carrisi	6	Alida Ferrarese	"Emozioni"	Eliminated
Episode 4 (18 December)	Clementino	7	Ambra Mattioli	"Space Oddity"	Eliminated
Episode 4 (18 December)	Clementino	8	Franklin Montague	"Che sarà"	Eliminated
Episode 4 (18 December)	Clementino	9	Roberto Tomasi	"Gli amori"	Advanced
Episode 4 (18 December)	Gigi D'Alessio	10	Elena Ferretti	"Come saprei"	Advanced
Episode 4 (18 December)	Gigi D'Alessio	11	Perla Trivellini	"Splendido splendente"	Eliminated
Episode 4 (18 December)	Gigi D'Alessio	12	Giancarlo Cajani	"La mia storia tra le dita"	Eliminated
Episode 4 (18 December)	Clementino	13	Pietro Dall'Oglio	"Quelli che benpensano"	Eliminated
Episode 4 (18 December)	Clementino	14	Alan Farrington	"(Sittin' on) the Dock of the Bay"	Advanced
Episode 4 (18 December)	Clementino	15	Michele Lapenna	"Corazón espinado"	Eliminated
Episode 4 (18 December)	Loredana Bertè	16	Giovanna Sorrentino	"Back to Black"	Advanced
Episode 4 (18 December)	Loredana Bertè	17	Roberta Cappelletti	"Città vuota"	Eliminated
Episode 4 (18 December)	Loredana Bertè	18	Giulio Todrani	"It's Not Unusual"	Eliminated
Episode 4 (18 December)	Gigi D'Alessio	19	Nello Buongiorno	"Mille giorni di te e di me"	Eliminated
Episode 4 (18 December)	Gigi D'Alessio	20	Laura Grey	"Tammurriata nera"	Eliminated
Episode 4 (18 December)	Gigi D'Alessio	21	Marco Guerzoni	"Malo"	Advanced
Episode 4 (18 December)	I Carrisi	22	Gianni Pera	"Canzone per te"	Eliminated
Episode 4 (18 December)	I Carrisi	23	Gennardo Vilardi	"Rose rosse"	Eliminated
Episode 4 (18 December)	I Carrisi	24	Rita Mammolotti	"Amami"	Advanced

== Final ==
The final was broadcast on December 20, 2020. In the first phase of the final, the eight talents who reached the final first performed in groups with their coach and then performed a cover assigned by their coach. At the end of the first stage, only three players from any team qualified for the second stage of the final. At the end of the second and final phase, the winner of the first edition of The Voice Senior was announced.

Gianna Nannini performed the song "Sei nell'anima" together with the 8 finalists.

Artist advanced to the Super-Final
Artist advanced the Super-Final

Round 1

Order	Coach	Artist	Performance with the coach	Song	Public Votes
1	I Carrisi	Rita Mammolotti	Nel blu dipinto di blu"	"Vita spericolata"	3,90%
2	I Carrisi	Tony Reale	Nel blu dipinto di blu"	"Stasera mi butto"	6,50%
3	Loredana Bertè	Erminio Sinni	"Ragazzo mio"	"Bella senz'anima"	33,60%
4	Loredana Bertè	Giovanna Sorrentino	"Ragazzo mio"	"Non ti scordar mai di me"	6,74%
5	Clementino	Alan Farrington	"Svalutation"	"Come Together"	8,32%
6	Clementino	Roberto Tomasi	"Svalutation"	"Portami via"	7,85%
7	Gigi D'Alessio	Marco Guerzoni	"Caruso"	"L'ombelico del mondo"	17,50%
8	Gigi D'Alessio	Elena Ferretti	"Caruso"	"Adagio"	15,60%

Round 2

Order	Coach	Artist	Song	Public Votes
1	Loredana Bertè	Erminio Sinni	"A mano a mano"	53,71%
2	Gigi D'Alessio	Marco Guerzoni	"Io so che ti amerò"	21,56%
3	Gigi D'Alessio	Elena Ferretti	"Ti sento"	24,73%
