= Annibale Giannarelli =

Italian singer (born 1948)

- Born: 9 May 1948 (age 78); Sassalbo, Massa-Carrara, Italy
- Occupations: Singer; pianist
- Years active: 1961–present

Annibale Giannarelli (born 9 May 1948) is an Italian singer and pianist with also Australian citizenship.

He is best known for the interpretation of the song Trinity by Franco Micalizzi, the main theme of the film They Call Me Trinity, performed together with Alessandro Alessandroni. The song was also used in the soundtrack of the film Django Unchained.

In 2021, Giannarelli won the second edition of the Italian talent show The Voice Senior.

== Discography ==
Studio albums

- È solo un'impressione di... Annibale (1972)
- Accussì (1972)
- The Singer and the Song (1979)
