= Orietta Berti =

Italian singer (born 1943)

Orietta Berti Commendatore OMRI
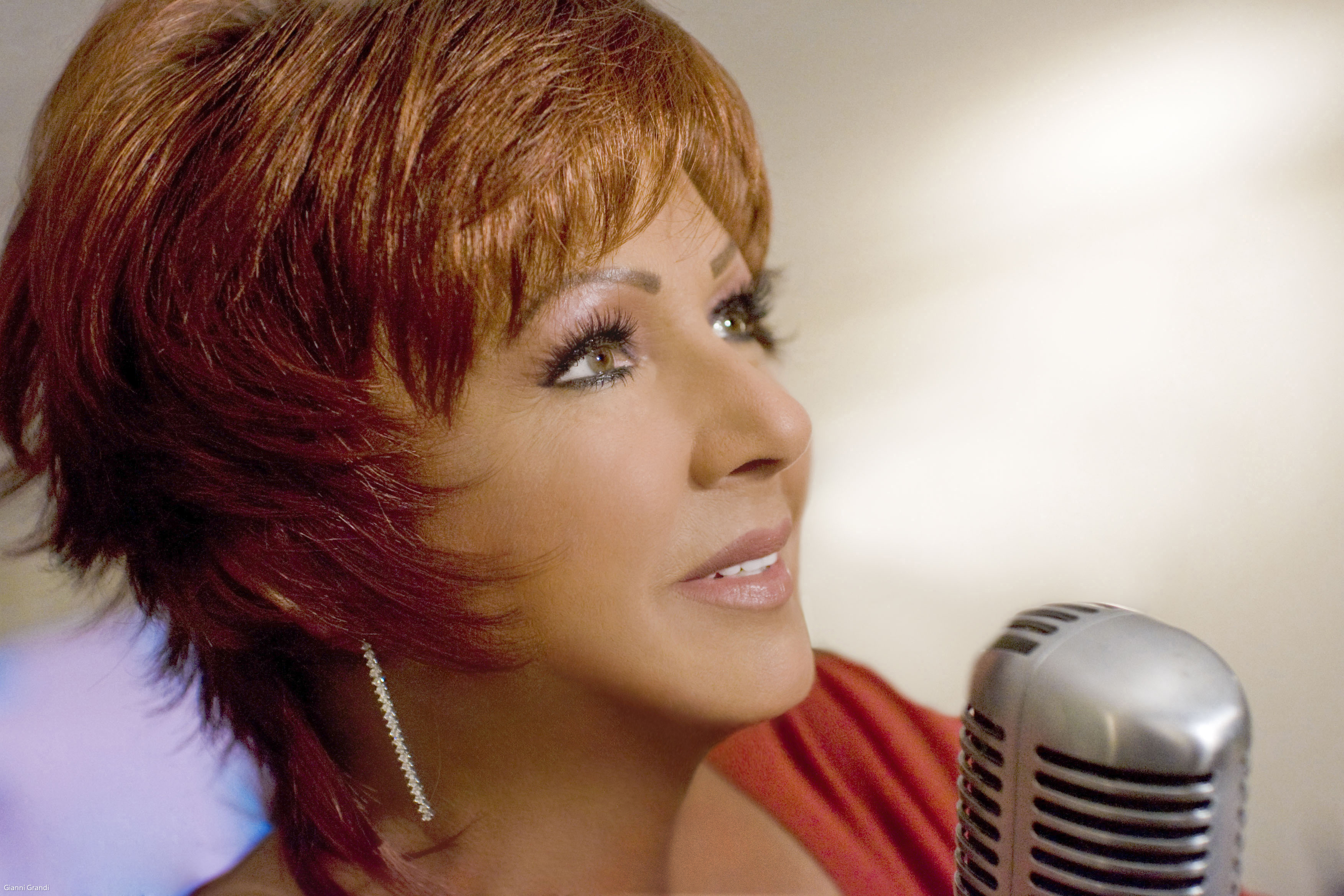
- Berti in 2008

Background information
- Born: Orietta Galimberti; 1 June 1943 (age 83); Cavriago, Emilia-Romagna, Kingdom of Italy
- Genres: Pop; folk; folk-pop
- Occupations: Singer; television personality; actress
- Years active: 1965–present
- Labels: Karim; Polydor; Cinevox; CGD
- Website: oriettaberti.it

Orietta Galimberti (born 1 June 1943), known professionally as Orietta Berti, is an Italian folk-pop singer and television personality.

== Biography ==
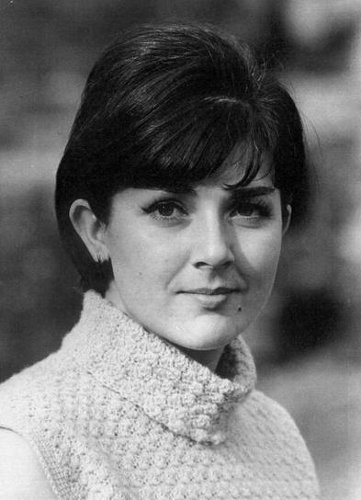
Orietta Berti in 1965

Born in Cavriago, Berti began her career in 1962 and had her first success in 1965 with the song "Tu sei quello" ("You're the one"), which won the music contest Un disco per l'estate and ranked second in the Italian hit parade. Several songs of hers, such as "Fin che la barca va" ("As long as the boat goes"), were not only commercial hits but also became instant classics in Italy.

Orietta Berti entered the Sanremo Music Festival competition 11 times between 1966 and 1992, and returned a 12th time in 2021, after a 29-year break, one of the longest between two participations of the same artist in the history of the contest. In 2021 Fedez, Achille Lauro and Orietta Berti published summer hit "Mille"'. With it, Berti came again to the first position of the FIMI singles chart 56 years after "Tu sei quello".

== Discography ==
=== Studio albums ===
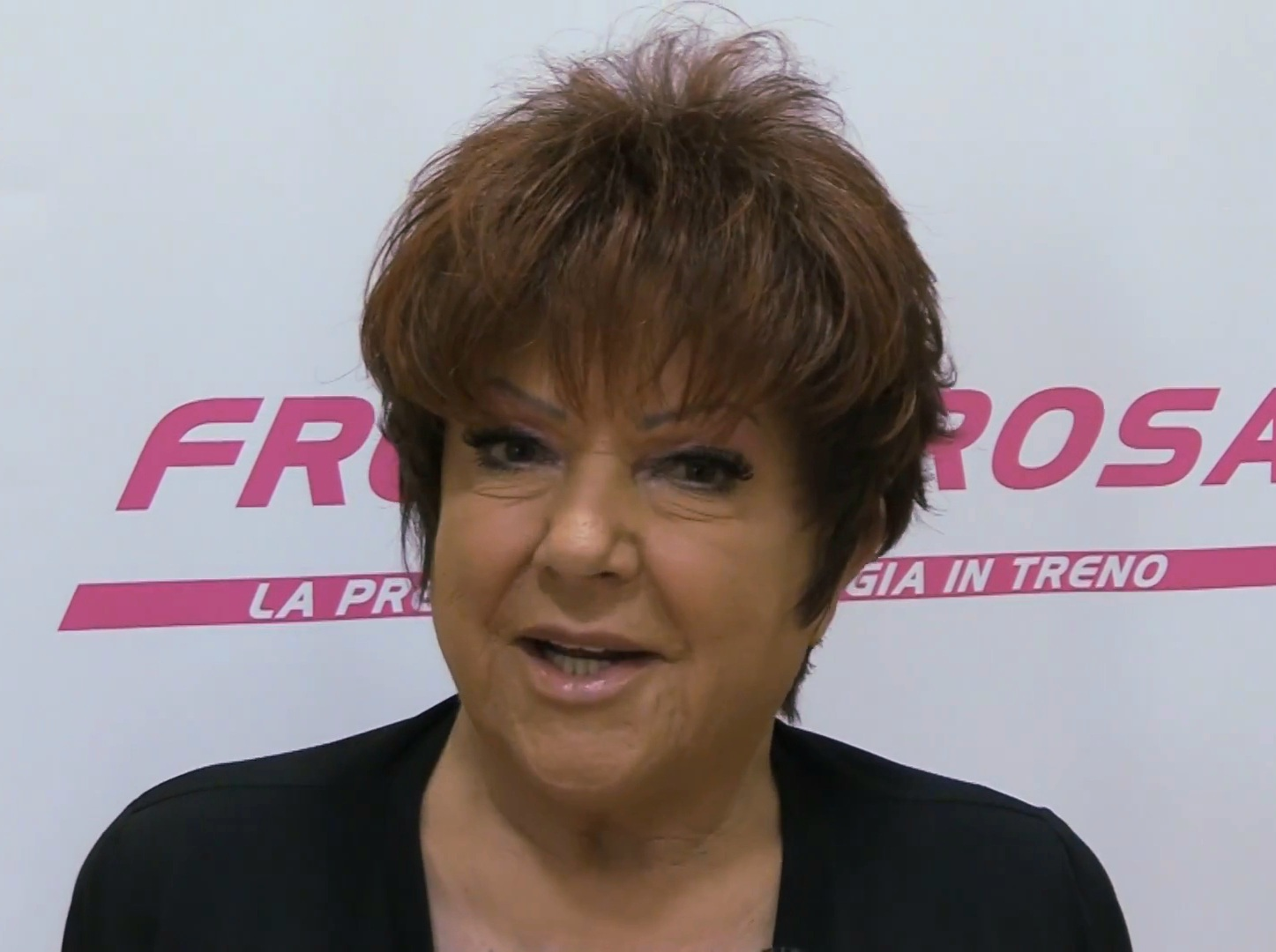
Berti in 2021

- Orietta Berti canta suor Sorriso (1965)
- Quando la prima stella (1966)
- Orietta Berti (1967)
- Dolcemente (1968)
- Tipitipitì (1970)
- Orietta (1971)
- Più italiane di me (1972)
- Cantatele con me (1973)
- Così come le canto (1974)
- Eppure... ti Amo (1975)
- Zingari... (1976)
- Barbapapà (1979)
- Pastelli (1979)
- Le mie nuove canzoni (1984)
- Futuro (1986)
- Io come donna (1989)
- Da un'eternità (1992)
- Per questo grande ed infinito amore (1996)
- Incompatibili ma divisibili (1999)
- Il meglio di Orietta vol. 1 (2000)
- Il meglio di Orietta vol. 2 (2000)
- Dominique (2002)
- Emozione d'autore (2003)
- Exitos latinos (2006)
- Swing – Un omaggio alla mia maniera (2008)
- Nonostante tutto... 45 anni di musica (2010)
- Dietro un grande amore (2015)
- La mia vita è un film (2021)

== Filmography ==
=== Films ===
Year	Title	Role(s)	Notes
1966	The Singing Nun	Sister Orietta	Uncredited
1968	Zum zum zum - La canzone che mi passa per la testa	Sister Teresa	
1969	Zum zum zum n° 2	Sister Teresa	
1977	I nuovi mostri	Fiorella	
1978	Quando c'era lui... caro lei!	Rachele	
2021	Extraliscio - Punk da balera	Herself	
2021	Luca	Concetta Aragosta	Voice
2026	Still Sexy	Herself	Cameo

=== Television ===
Year	Title	Role(s)	Notes
1970	La cugina Orietta	Herself / Presenter	Variety show
1991	L'Odissea	Arete	Television movie
1997–2000	Quelli che... il Calcio	Herself / Regular guest	Talk show
1999	Un medico in famiglia	Herself	Episode: "Natale in casa Martini"
2006	Ballando con le Stelle	Herself / Contestant	Talent show (season 3)
2010	Tutti i padri di Maria	Wanda	Television movie
2011	Ti lascio una canzone	Herself / Judge	Music contest
2018	Untraditional	Herself	Episode: "Gli hashtag non dormono mai"
2021–2022	The Voice Senior	Herself / Coach	Talent show (season 2)
2023	Che Dio ci aiuti	Herself	Episode: "Il mio angelo"
