= Ronnie Jones (singer) =

Ronald Hugo Jones
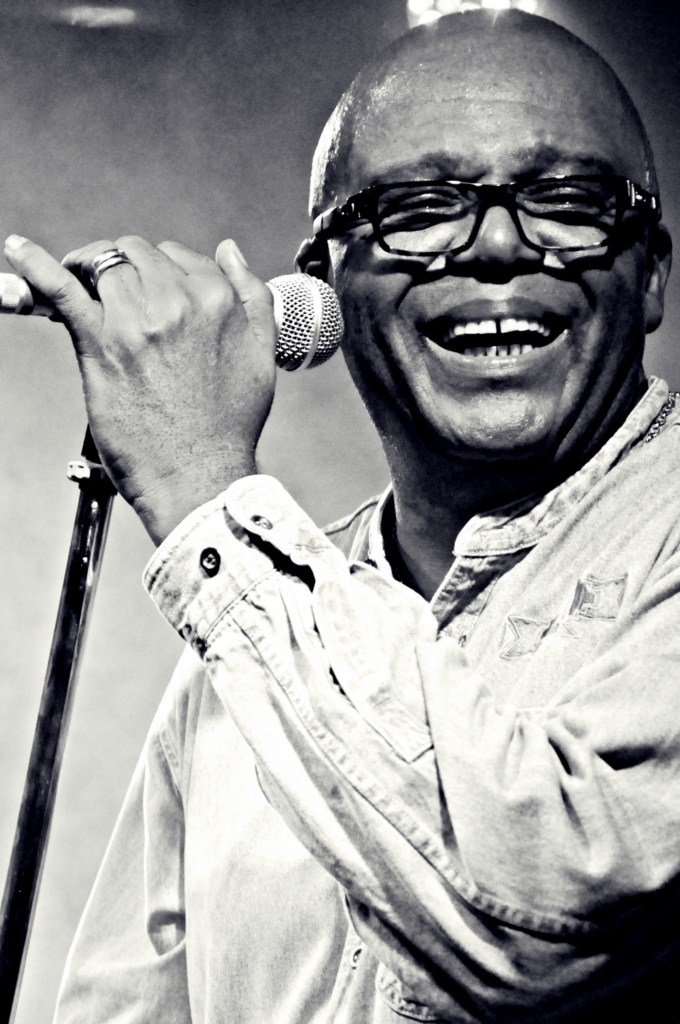

Background information
- Born: Ronald Hugo Jones; 14 September 1937 (age 88); Springfield, Massachusetts, United States
- Genres: R&B; Blues; Disco
- Occupations: Singer; DJ; TV Host
- Years active: 1961-present

Ronald Hugo Jones (born September 14, 1937, in Springfield, Massachusetts, United States) is an Italy-based, American-born R&B, blues and disco singer.

== Musical career ==
Jones first came to Europe with the United States Air Force. He started his career in England, where he joined the first incarnation of the Blues Incorporated with Alexis Korner, Jack Bruce, Cyril Davis, Johnny Parker and Ginger Baker. He later formed a band called The Nightimers with John McLaughlin, before moving to Italy to join the cast of the local production of Hair. He then performed with artists such as Claudja Barry and Cooper Terry, and had a hit in the Italian charts with Funky Bump (Atlantic, 1976).

In the 1970s and the 1980s Jones worked as a musician, DJ and TV host at RAI and Radio 105 Network. From 1980 to 1985 he hosted the TV show Popcorn. The theme, "Video Games", charted #28 on the Italian hit parade.

In 1988 he wrote the song Bambino Io, Bambino Tu for Zucchero.

Jones has been residing in Italy since 1979 and tours regularly with his band, The Soul Syndicate.

== Discography ==
=== Albums ===
Year	Title
1976	Lookin' For Action
1978	Me And Myself
1979	Fox On The Run
1980	Games
1996	The Best Of Ronnie Jones
1998	The Man
2008	Again
2009	Ray Charles Memories
2011	Bang!

=== Singles ===
Year	Title
1964	"Night Time Is The Right Time" (with Blues Incorporated)
1964	"I Need Your Loving" / "Let's Spin A Rose On You"
1965	"It's All Over" / "My Love"
1965	"Anyone Who Knows What Love is" / "Nobody But You"
1966	"Satisfy My Soul" / "My Only Souvenir"
1967	"Little Bitty Pretty One" / "Put Your Tears Away"
1967	"In My Love Mind" / "Mama Come On Home"
1968	"Without Love (There Is Nothing)" / "Little Bitty Pretty One"
1969	"Rock You Baby" / "The City"
1973	"Sunshine Day" / "Every Beat Of My Heart"
1974	"Angela"
1976	"Soul Sister" / "Lookin' for Action"
1976	"Under My Thumb" / "It's the Same Old Song" / "Satin Sheets"
1977	"It Takes Two" (with Claudja Barry) / "Take Me"
1978	"Me and Myself" / "Number One"
1979	"Fox On The Run" / "Southside Philly"
1980	"Richman" / "My Dance Exercises"
1980	"Let's Do It Again" / "Cosmo Rap"
1981	"The Two Of Us" / "United We Stand"
1982	"Laser Love" / "The Two Of Us Remix"
1983	"You And I"
1984	"Good Times" / "Band Of Jocks"
1986	"Into The Groove"
2001	"Wake Up Reggae"
