= La leva calcistica della classe '68 =

1982 single by Francesco De Gregori

Single by Francesco De Gregori

from the album Titanic
- Released: 1982
- Length: 4:22
- Label: RCA Italiana

Francesco De Gregori singles chronology
"Viva l'Italia" (1979)	"La leva calcistica della classe '68" (1982)	"La donna cannone" (1983)

Audio
- "La leva calcistica della classe '68" on YouTube

"La leva calcistica della classe '68" ('The Football Draft of the Class of '68'), also commonly known as "Nino" and "La leva", is a song by Italian singer Francesco De Gregori, released in 1982.

== Composition ==
The song tells the story of a 12-year-old child making a football selection, with football intended as a metaphor for life. Over the years, critics have identified the song's protagonist with several football players, most notably Agostino Di Bartolomei and Bruno Conti.

The music cites Elton John's "The Greatest Discovery" in the verse "E chissà quanti ne hai visti e quanti ne vedrai", while the coda is a citation of Lucio Battisti's "Vento nel vento". The song features Mimmo Locasciulli on piano and keyboards.

== Reception ==
The choice of 1968 as the year of birth of the main character led to various political interpretations of the lyrics. Italian music critic Claudio Fabretti noted: "Nino, the 12-year-old footballer who goes through mistakes and fears in search of a role in society, is the easily decodifiable symbol of an entire generation". De Gregori's colleague Roberto Vecchioni wrote about the song: "[De Gregori] knows how to make epic lyricism out of the small struggle between a boy and a game, between a generation and a failure that has already taken place". In this interpretation, the song was included in the soundtrack of the Gabriele Salvatores' 1989 film Marrakech Express.

In 2015, the Italian Footballers' Association awarded De Gregori the Football Leader Prize, saying in the motivation that with this song "Francesco De Gregori masterfully narrated the highest and purest meaning of football".

== Other versions ==
In 2010, De Gregori recorded a live version of the song in a duet with Lucio Dalla in the album Work in Progress. In 2015, a remake of the song was chosen as the fourth single from the album Vivavoce.

Artists who covered the song include Massimo Ranieri, Nomadi, and Schola Cantorum.

== Track listing ==
No.	Title	Writer(s)	Length
1.	"La leva calcistica della classe '68"	De Gregori	4:22
2.	"Centocinquanta stelle"	De Gregori	3:23

== Certifications ==
Region	Certification	Certified units/sales
Italy (FIMI) Sales from 2009	Platinum	50,000^{‡}
^{‡} Sales+streaming figures based on certification alone.
