= Alice non lo sa =

Studio album by Francesco De Gregori
- Released: April 1973
- Studio: Studio 38, Rome
- Genre: Pop
- Length: 40:43
- Language: Italian
- Label: It
- Producer: Edoardo De Angelis

Francesco De Gregori chronology
| Alice non lo sa (1973) | Francesco De Gregori (1974) |

Alice non lo sa is the debut solo album by Italian singer-songwriter Francesco De Gregori, released in April 1973 by It. The previous year the eponymous duo of De Gregori and Antonello Venditti—another Italian singer-songwriter–published a hybrid album, Theorius Campus, with some songs by De Gregori.

The title track, "Alice", is one of De Gregori's best known songs, and has become a classic.

== Reception ==
The historian Cesare Grazioli writes that De Gregori became the acknowledged "prince" of songwriters, inspired by Bob Dylan, a melancholy narrative voice expressing the doubt, ambiguity and human crisis of the times, with Alice no lo sa his first album. The album gained for De Gregori an undeserved reputation for being obscure. The album indicated De Gregori's innovativeness: the title song, "Alice", broke with the past with its elegant lyrics and visionary quality, still esteemed a generation later. The album was not an immediate commercial hit, but it had great artistic value with its evocative poetry and sophisticated melodies, and it proved to be the first of a series of masterpieces of popular music. Mariano Prunes, reviewing the album on AllMusic.com, notes that while only the title track is recognised as a classic, several other songs deserve to be. The album, writes Prunes, is influenced by Leonard Cohen, and "Marianna al Bivio" actually refers to Cohen's songs "Suzanne" and "So Long, Marianne", the lyrics throughout taking centre stage rather than, as was de rigueur in Italy at the time, making the singing openly personal or political.

== Track listing ==
All lyrics are written by Francesco De Gregori, except where noted; all music is composed by De Gregori.

Side one
| No. | Title | Length |
|---|---|---|
| 1. | "Alice" | 3:45 |
| 2. | "1940" | 4:17 |
| 3. | "Le strade di lei" | 4:16 |
| 4. | "Suonatori di flauto" | 2:08 |
| 5. | "Buonanotte fratello" | 3:54 |
| 6. | "Sono tuo" | 2:40 |

Side two
| No. | Title | Length |
|---|---|---|
| 7. | "I musicanti" | 2:08 |
| 8. | "La casa di Hilde" (De Gregori, Edoardo De Angelis) | 4:40 |
| 9. | "Il ragazzo" | 4:25 |
| 10. | "Irene" | 2:12 |
| 11. | "Marianna al bivio" | 3:02 |
| 12. | "Saigon" | 3:22 |
