= Com'è profondo il mare =

Studio album by Lucio Dalla
- Released: 1977
- Studio: RCA Studios (Rome), Stone Castle Studios
- Genre: Avant-pop
- Length: 36:04
- Label: RCA Italiana
- Producer: Alessandro Colombini, Renzo Cremonini

Lucio Dalla chronology
Automobili (1976)	Com'è profondo il mare (1977)	Lucio Dalla (1979)

Com'è profondo il mare ("How deep is the sea") is an album by Italian singer-songwriter Lucio Dalla, released in 1977 by RCA Italiana. It was the first work in which Dalla wrote both the music and lyrics, after three albums in which the latter had been provided by poet Roberto Roversi.

== Track listing ==
- All songs written and arranged by Lucio Dalla, except where noted. Copyright Cyclus Musikverlag.
1. "Come è profondo il mare" - 5:24
2. "Treno a vela" - 3:27
3. "Il cucciolo Alfredo" - 5:22
4. "Corso Buenos Aires" - 4:38
5. "Disperato erotico stomp" - 5:52
6. "Quale allegria" - 4:30 (arranged by Ruggero Cini)
7. "...E non andar più via" - 3:25
8. "Barcarola" - 3:50

== Personnel ==
- Lucio Dalla: Vocals, keyboards, wind instruments
- Jimmy Villotti, Luciano Ciccagilioni: Acoustic and electric guitars
- Rosalino Cellamare: Acoustic and electric guitars, keyboards
- Sandro Centofanti, Fabio Liberatori: Keyboards
- Marco Nanni: Bass
- Giovanni Pezzoli: Drums, percussion
- Gaetano Zoccanali, Gianni Oddi: Wind instruments
- "Baba Yaga": Backing vocals

== Charts ==
Chart performance for Com'è profondo il mare
Chart (1977–1978)	Peak position
Italian Albums (Musica e dischi)	9
