= Roversi =

Roversi is an Italian surname. Notable people with the surname include:

- Alba Roversi (born 1961), Venezuelan telenovela and theatre actress
- Paolo Roversi (born 1947), Italian-born fashion photographer
- Roberto Roversi (1923–2012), Italian poet, writer and journalist
