= La donna cannone =

1983 single by Francesco De Gregori

Single by Francesco De Gregori
- Released: 1983
- Length: 4:39
- Label: RCA Italiana

Francesco De Gregori singles chronology
"La leva calcistica della classe '68" (1982)	"La donna cannone" (1983)	"I cowboys" (1985)

Audio
- "La donna cannone" on YouTube

"La donna cannone" ('The Cannonball Woman') is a song by Italian singer Francesco De Gregori, released in 1983.

== Overview ==
De Gregori first composed the music, then, despite weeks of effort, he initially struggled to come up with some suitable verses. He eventually got inspiration for the lyrics from a newspaper article about a woman who, after working as a human cannonball, decided to leave the circus. The song was originally composed as the theme for the film Flirt and was released, along with three other soundtrack pieces, on an EP (then referred to as a Q-Disc) of the same name. The original, more symphonic recording was arranged by Renato Serio and features Mimmo Locasciulli on piano, while in his concerts De Gregori generally opts for a more rock-influenced and guitar-based rendition.

Artists who covered the song include Mia Martini, Ornella Vanoni, Joan Baez, Gianna Nannini, Ricchi e Poveri, Mango, Spagna, Gigliola Cinquetti, Elodie, Anna Oxa, Richard Clayderman, Arisa, Malika Ayane, Noemi, Lorenzo Fragola, Fausto Cigliano, Marco Carta, Silvia Salemi, Schola Cantorum. In 2022, De Gregori recorded a new version of the song in a duet with Antonello Venditti.

== Track listing ==
Q-Disc

No.	Title	Writer(s)	Length
1.	"La donna cannone"	De Gregori	4:39
2.	"Flirt #1"	De Gregori	4:15
3.	"La ragazza e la miniera"	De Gregori	3:55
4.	"Flirt #2"	De Gregori	2:35
5.	"Canta canta"	De Gregori	2:50

Single

No.	Title	Writer(s)	Length
1.	"La donna cannone"	De Gregori	4:39
2.	"Canta canta"	De Gregori	2:50

== Charts ==
Chart (1983–1984)	Peak position
Italy (Musica e dischi)	1

== Certifications ==
Region	Certification	Certified units/sales
Italy (FIMI) Sales from 2009	2× Platinum	100,000^{‡}
^{‡} Sales+streaming figures based on certification alone.
