= 1983 (disambiguation) =

1983 was a common year starting on Saturday of the Gregorian calendar.

1983 or '83 may also refer to:

== Music ==
- 1983 (Flying Lotus album), 2006
- 1983 (Lucio Dalla album), 1983
- 1983, a 2010 album by Sophie Hunger
- "1983" (song), a 2010 song by Neon Trees
- "1983... (A Merman I Should Turn to Be)", a song by The Jimi Hendrix Experience

== Other uses ==
- 1983 (film), a 2014 Indian film by Abrid Shine
- '83 (film), a 2021 Indian cricket film
- 1983 (TV series), a 2018 Netflix series
- Civil Rights Act of 1871, later amended and placed in U.S. Code as Section 1983
- The Bite of '83, a piece of lore in the video game Five Nights at Freddy's
