= Bufalo Bill =

Studio album by Francesco De Gregori
- Released: 1976
- Genre: Italian singer-songwriters
- Length: 36 min.
- Label: RCA Italia
- Producer: Francesco De Gregori

Francesco De Gregori chronology
Rimmel (1975)	Bufalo Bill (1976)	De Gregori (1978)

Bufalo Bill is an album by Italian singer-songwriter Francesco De Gregori. It was released in 1976 by RCA Italia. The title is an intentional misspelling of Buffalo Bill's name: buffalo is often rendered in Italian as "bufalo", although specifically defining a different animal in that language.

The cover is a portrait by American artist Gil Elvgren, from a 1948 magazine.

== The album ==
The album include some of the most popular De Gregori songs, including the title track (a ballad about a disillusioned Buffalo Bill and about contradictions of the American myth, partially inspired by the Sam Peckinpah film The Ballad of Cable Hogue), the romantic "Atlantide" and the desperate anthem "Santa Lucia".

"Festival" is about the suicide of singer-songwriter Luigi Tenco at the Sanremo Festival, and the hypocrisy with which media dealt with that event.

The music of "Giovane esploratore Tobia" was co-written with Lucio Dalla, who had also collaborated with two songs on the previous De Gregori album, Rimmel.

== Personnel ==
- Mario Scotti – Bass
- Roberto "Bob Rose" Rosati – Guitar
- Carlo Felice Marcovecchio – Drums
- Antonio "Toto" Torquati – Hammond organ
- Baba Yaga – Voices

== Track listing ==
1. "Bufalo Bill"
2. "Giovane esploratore Tobia"
3. "L'uccisione di Babbo Natale "
4. "Disastro aereo sul canale di Sicilia"
5. "Ninetto e la colonia"
6. "Atlantide"
7. "Ipercarmela"
8. "Ultimo discorso registrato"
9. "Festival"
10. "Santa Lucia"

All songs written by Francesco De Gregori, apart "Giovane esploratore Tobia", music co-written by Lucio Dalla.

== Charts ==
Chart (1975)	Peak position
Italy (Musica e dischi)	2
