= Lucio Dalla (album) =

Studio album by Lucio Dalla
- Released: February 1979
- Genre: Avant-rock, pop
- Length: 37:19
- Label: RCA Italia
- Producer: Renzo Cremonini, Alessandro Colombini

Lucio Dalla chronology
Com'è profondo il mare	Lucio Dalla	Banana Republic

Lucio Dalla (1979) is an album by the Italian singer-songwriter Lucio Dalla.

== Background ==
The second LP for which Dalla wrote both lyrics and music, Lucio Dalla was released by RCA Italiana, and is generally considered among his finest works. It contains some of his most popular songs, such as "Anna e Marco", "Milano" and "L'anno che verrà". "Cosa sarà", written with Ron, is sung together with Francesco De Gregori. The second half of the album features a string orchestra.

== Release ==
The album was originally scheduled for release in late 1978, but RCA chose to postpone it to push sales of the Dalla-De Gregori single "Ma come fanno i marinai" for the 1978 Christmas period. It was eventually released in February 1979.

== Reception ==
The album got a massive success, selling over 500,000 copies and resulting as the most sold album of the year.

== Track listing ==
All songs by Lucio Dalla, except "Cosa sarà", music co-written with Ron.

1. "L'ultima luna" (5:40)
2. "Stella di mare" (5:56)
3. "La signora" (3:59)
4. "Milano" (3:28)
5. "Anna e Marco" (3:41)
6. "Tango" (3:56)
7. "Cosa sarà" (4:20) ft. Francesco De Gregori
8. "Notte" (3:37)
9. "L'anno che verrà" (4:24)

== Charts ==
Chart performance for Lucio Dalla
Chart (1979–1980)	Peak position
Italian Albums (Musica e dischi)	2

== Certifications ==
Certifications for Lucio Dalla
Region	Certification	Certified units/sales
Italy (FIMI)	2× Platinum	400,000^{‡}
^{‡} Sales+streaming figures based on certification alone.
