= Prendilo tu questo frutto amaro =

Studio album by Antonello Venditti
- Released: 1995
- Genre: Pop
- Length: 40:37
- Label: Heinz Music
- Producer: Alessandro Colombini

Antonello Venditti chronology
Da San Siro a Samarcanda - L'amore insegna agli uomini (1992)	Prendilo tu questo frutto amaro (1995)	Antonello nel Paese delle Meraviglie (1997)

Prendilo tu questo frutto amaro is a music album by Italian singer Antonello Venditti, released in 1995.

== Track listing ==
1. "Ogni volta" - 4.59 (A. Venditti)
2. "Tutti all'inferno" - 5.08 (A. Venditti)
3. "Vento selvaggio" - 5.04 (A. Venditti)
4. "Eroi minori" - 4.51 (A. Venditti)
5. "Prendilo tu questo frutto amaro" - 5.15 (A. Venditti, S. Van Zandt)
6. "Parla come baci" - 5.27 (A. Venditti, L. Anastasi, D. Cherni, A. Lo Giudice, M. Perfetto)
7. "A che gioco giochi" - 5.03 (A. Venditti)
8. "1000 figli" - 4.44 (A. Venditti)

== Charts ==
Chart (1995)	Peak position
Italian Albums Chart	1
Swiss Albums Chart	39
