= Scacchi e tarocchi =

Studio album by Francesco De Gregori
- Released: 1985
- Genre: Italian singer-songwriters
- Length: 34:49 min.
- Label: RCA Italiana
- Producer: Francesco De Gregori; Ivano Fossati

Francesco De Gregori chronology
La donna cannone (1983)	Scacchi e tarocchi (1985)	Terra di nessuno (1987)

Scacchi e tarocchi is an album by the Italian singer-songwriter Francesco De Gregori, released in 1985.

The song "A Pà" is dedicated to Pier Paolo Pasolini. Singer-songwriter Ivano Fossati collaborated to the production (songs "Scacchi e tarocchi" and "Miracolo a Venezia") and also played several instruments.

On this album duo Sly and Robbie plays drums and bass

== Track listing ==
All songs by Francesco De Gregori.

1. "La storia"
2. "Scacchi e tarocchi"
3. "I cowboys"
4. "Ciao ciao"
5. "Poeti per l'estate"
6. "A Pà"
7. "Sotto le stelle del Messico a trapanar"
8. "Piccoli dolori"
9. "Tutti salvi"
10. "Miracolo a Venezia"

== Charts ==
Chart (1985–1986)	Peak position
Italy (Musica e dischi)	2
