= Ullala =

Ullala may refer to:

- Ullal, or Uḷḷāla, a town in Karnataka, Indian
- Ullàlla, a 1976 album by Antonello Venditti
