= Quando verrà Natale =

Studio album by Antonello Venditti
- Released: September 1974
- Genre: Italian singer-songwriters
- Length: 37:11
- Label: RCA Italia
- Producer: Antonello Venditti

Antonello Venditti chronology
Le cose della vita (1973)	Quando verrà Natale (1974)	Lilly (1975)

Quando verrà Natale is a music album by Italian singer-songwriter Antonello Venditti. It was released by RCA Italia in 1974.

The most famous song in the album is "A Cristo" ("To Christ"), an ironical depiction of a modern Jesus straggling amongst the 1970s society: after performing this song in a show with Francesco de Gregori and Riccardo Cocciante, Venditti was arrested (15 January 1974) under the accusation of offence to religion. He was later acquitted from any charge. Later he wrote the song "Campo de' Fiori", also in the album, dedicated to a square in Rome where the philosopher Giordano Bruno was burnt alive under the accusation of heresy, and taken as a symbol of freedom of thought. Also devoted to a square in Rome is "Piazzale degli Eroi", alluding to the rich and post-fascist bourgeoisie living in that area.

== Track listing ==
All songs are written by Antonello Venditti.

1. "A Cristo" — 6:21
2. "Marta" — 5:11
3. "Piazzale degli eroi" — 3:53
4. "Ora che sono pioggia" — 3:47
5. "Campo de' Fiori" — 6:01
6. "Figli del domani" — 6:25
7. "Quando verrà Natale" — 5:33

== Charts ==
Chart (1974-5)	Highest position
Italy (Musica e dischi)	13
