= Sotto il segno dei pesci =

Studio album by Antonello Venditti
- Released: 1978
- Genre: World; Pop; Pop rock
- Length: 40:24
- Label: PolyGram Italia SRL

Antonello Venditti chronology
Ullàlla (1976)	Sotto il segno dei pesci (1978)	Buona domenica (1979)

Sotto il segno dei pesci is a 1978 music album by Antonello Venditti.

The title track of the album, "Sotto il segno dei pesci", peaked at number-one on the Italian charts.

== Track listing ==
No.	Title	Length	Ref.
1.	"Sotto il segno dei pesci"	6:03	
2.	"Francesco"	4:26	
3.	"Bomba o non bomba"	5:07	
4.	"Chen il Chinese"	4:09	
5.	"Sara"	4:31	
6.	"Il telegiornale"	5:13	
7.	"Giulia"	5:07	
8.	"L'uomo falco"	5:47	

== Charts ==
Chart (1978)	Highest position
Italy (Musica e dischi)	1
