= Alice (Francesco De Gregori song) =

1973 single by Francesco De Gregori

Single by Francesco De Gregori

from the album Alice non lo sa
- Released: 1973
- Length: 3:45
- Label: RCA Italiana
- Producer: Edoardo De Angelis

Francesco De Gregori singles chronology
"Alice" (1973)	"Niente da capire" (1974)

Audio
- "Alice" on YouTube

"Alice" is a song by Italian singer Francesco De Gregori, released in 1973. The debut single of De Gregori, it was included in the album Alice non lo sa.

== Composition ==
De Gregori drew inspiration for the lyrics from a variety of sources, including James Joyce's stream of consciousness from Ulysses, Tristan Tzara's poetry, Andy Warhol's works, Michelangelo Antonioni's Blowup and Federico Fellini's 8½. The song features five character: the titular Alice (inspired by Lewis Carroll's Alice's Adventures in Wonderland), Irene (to whom De Gregori dedicated a follow-up song included in the same album), Lilli Marlene, Cesare (inspired by Italian poet Cesare Pavese) and an ambiguous bridegroom who, though unnamed, is the central figure of the song, and that years later De Gregori revealed being based on himself.

The verse "Il mendicante arabo ha un cancro nel cappello" ('The Arab beggar has cancer under his hat') was turned into "ha qualcosa nel cappello" ('has something in his hat') under pressure from RAI, which otherwise would not have broadcast the song, considering it disturbing.

== Reception ==
"Alice" premiered at Un disco per l'estate, where it finished in last place. In spite of this, it gradually climbed the hit parade, and marked the breakout of De Gregori.

The song has often been labeled as hermetic, and Italian music critic Dario Salvatori described it as "one of De Gregori's most unsettling songs", presenting a sequence of surreal images "which seem to be layered chaotically, devoid of any logical coherence". De Gregori refuted the hermetism label, and claimed the song being closer to "a dadaist poetry or a cubist painting". Enrico Deregibus noted "Every verse carries several possible interpretations and every listener can wander through them at will, revisit them and [then] start anew".

== Other versions ==
In 2014, De Gregori recorded a new version of the song in a duet with Ligabue. Artists who covered the song include Mia Martini, Fiorella Mannoia, Enrico Ruggeri and Schola Cantorum.

== Track listing ==
No.	Title	Writer(s)	Length
1.	"Alice"	De Gregori	3:45
2.	"I musicanti"	De Gregori	2:08

== Charts ==
Francesco De Gregori original version

Chart (1973)	Peak position
Italy (Musica e dischi)	21

Francesco De Gregori ft. Ligabue version

Chart (2014)	Peak position
Italy (FIMI)	38

== Certifications ==
Region	Certification	Certified units/sales
Italy (FIMI) Sales from 2009	Gold	25,000^{‡}
^{‡} Sales+streaming figures based on certification alone.
