= Canzoni (disambiguation) =

Canzoni or canzone is an Italian or Provençal song or ballad.

Canzoni may also refer to:

- Canzoni (Fabrizio De André album), 1974
- Canzoni (Lucio Dalla album), 1996
- "Canzoni" (song), a 1989 song by Mietta
- Canzoni, a 1990 album by Mietta
- Canzoni, a 2014 album by Chiara Civello
