= Rimmel (album) =

Studio album by Francesco De Gregori
- Released: 1975
- Genre: Canzone d'autore
- Length: 29:32
- Label: RCA Italia
- Producer: Francesco De Gregori/Lucio Dalla

Francesco De Gregori chronology
Francesco De Gregori (1974)	Rimmel (1975)	Bufalo Bill (1976)

Professional ratings
Review scores
Source	Rating
Allmusic	4.5/5 stars

Rimmel is an album by Italian singer-songwriter Francesco De Gregori. It was released in 1975 by RCA Italia and is generally considered among De Gregori's finest works, containing some of his most popular songs, such as "Rimmel", "Pablo" and "Buonanotte fiorellino”.

== Album ==
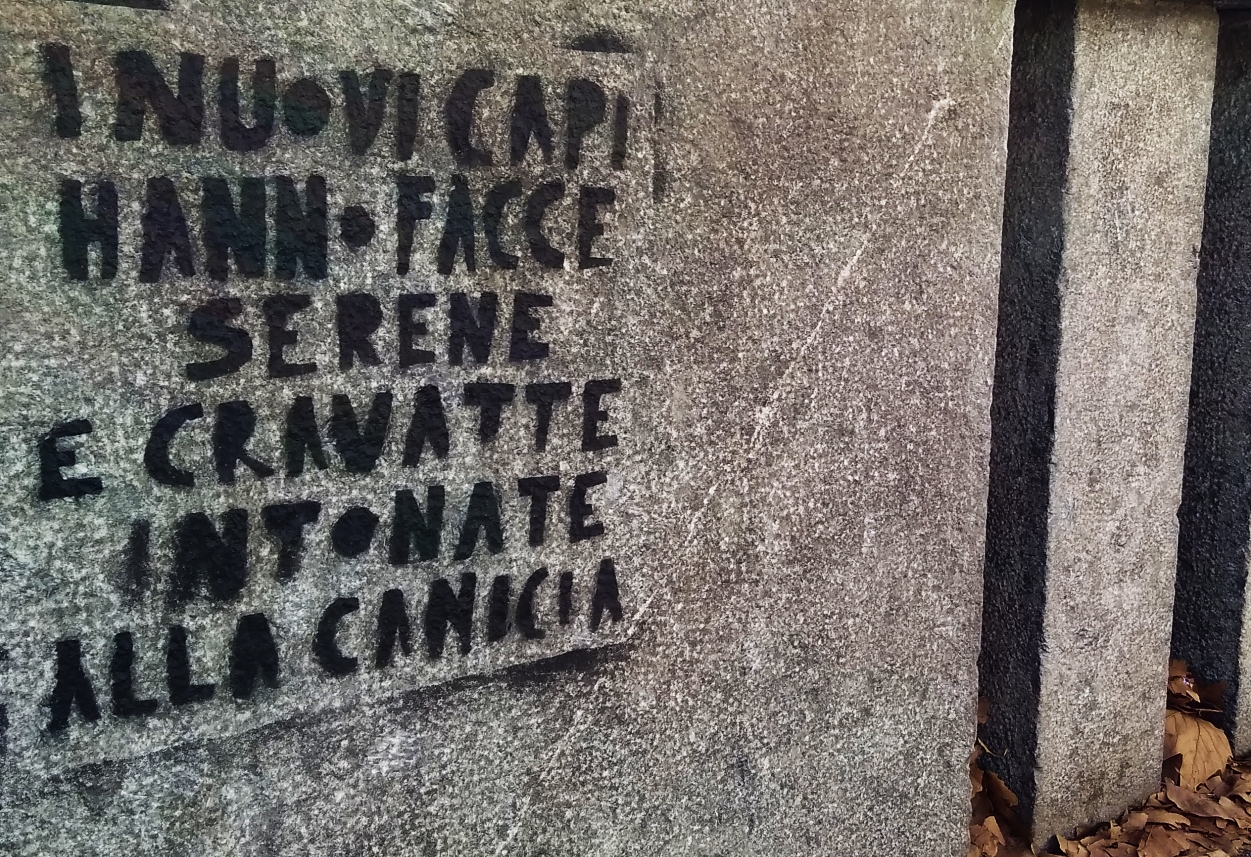
Graffiti quoting "Le storie di ieri"

The LP was well received both by critics and the public, and established De Gregori as one of the most popular singer-songwriters in his country. It was one of the best selling albums in Italy in 1975, with over 500,000 copies sold.

The song "Le storie di ieri", though written by De Gregori, was first recorded by Fabrizio De André as part of his 1974 album Volume 8, which he co-wrote with De Gregori. The two versions have minor lyrical differences.

Lucio Dalla is credited as co-author of the music for "Pablo".

== Track listing ==
1. "Rimmel" (3:39)
2. "Pezzi di vetro" (3:06)
3. "Il Signor Hood" (3:11)
4. "Pablo" (4:22)
5. "Buonanotte fiorellino" (2:05)
6. "Le storie di ieri" (4:08)
7. "Quattro cani" (3:14)
8. "Piccola mela" (2:42)
9. "Piano bar" (2:41)

== Charts ==
Chart (1975)	Peak position
Italy (Musica e dischi)	3
