= Edoardo De Angelis (singer-songwriter) =

Italian singer-songwriter

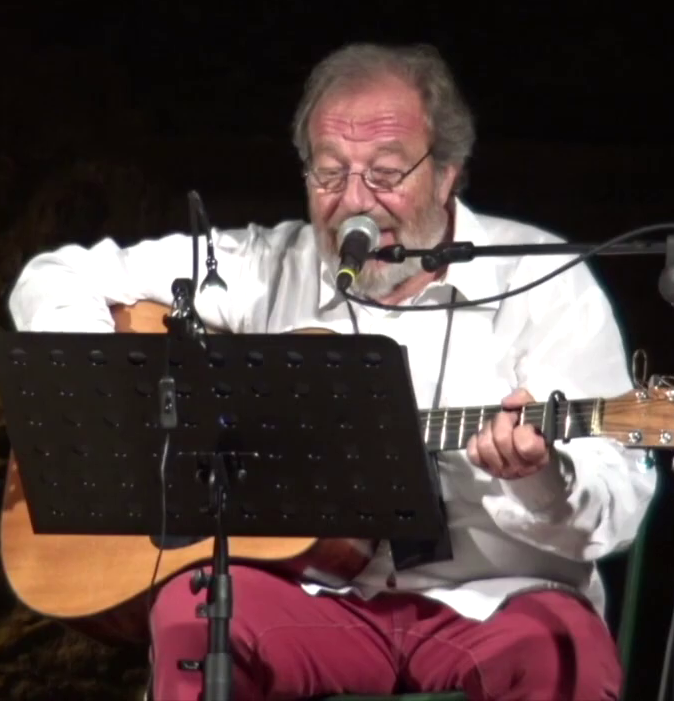
- De Angelis in 2019
- Born: 24 December 1945 (age 80); Rome, Italy
- Occupation: Singer-songwriter
- Musical career
- Genres: Folk; pop; art rock
- Instrument: Guitar
- Labels: RCA; Polydor; Durium; BMG; Virgin; Fonit Cetra; Rai Trade

Edoardo De Angelis (born 24 December 1945) is an Italian singer-songwriter and record producer.

== Life and career ==
Born in Rome, De Angelis graduated from the Liceo classico Torquato Tasso and studied modern letters at the Sapienza University of Rome. Since the late 1960s he started performing at Folkstudio, where he befriended Francesco De Gregori, of whom he produced the first two albums. In 1974 De Angelis was among the founding members of the vocal group Schola Cantorum, with whom he also collaborated as a songwriter, but after 4 albums he left the group to reprise his solo activity. He is best known for the song is "Lella", a ballad he composed and first recorded with his childhood friend Stelio Gicca Palli as "Edoardo e Stelio" and which later became a hit in a cover version of Edoardo Vianello and Wilma Goich.

De Angelis was the artistic director of the labels D'Autore and Cantare In Italiano. He was also a columnist for the magazine Ciao 2001 and a radio host for Radio 1.

== Discography ==
- 1972 - Il paese dove nascono i limoni (Valiant, ZSLV 55047)
- 1977 - Il tuo cuore è casa mia (RCA Italiana, PL 31243)
- 1978 - Piccola storia di libertà (Polydor, 2448 069)
- 1979 - Edoardo De Angelis (Polydor, 2448 087)
- 1981 - Anche meglio di Garibaldi (Durium)
- 1982 - Cantare in italiano (Durium/Chewing music, CML 4001)
- 1984 - Mia madre parla a raffica (Spaghetti Records, SPRQ 401)
- 1986 - Cammina cammina (Virgin, dv 500)
- 1992 - Gara di sogni (Fonit Cetra, TPLX 311)
- 1994 - De Angelis (BMG, 74321146222)
- 1996 - Parole nel cuore (BMG, 743221337382)
- 1997 - Antologia d'autore (Tring)
- 2002 - Il coraggio delle parole (D'Autore, DA1004)
- 2004 - Antologia d'autore (D'Autore)
- 2005 - Le allodole di Shakespeare (D'Autore)
- 2008 - Historias (il manifesto, CD 188)
- 2010 - Te la ricordi Lella (Editrice Zona, libro + CD)
- 2011 - Sale di Sicilia (Rai Trade, RTP 0252)
- 2016 - Il cantautore necessario (Helikonia, HK 1609)
- 2018 - Nuove Canzoni (Musica del Sud/Il cantautore necessario)
