= De Gregori =

Studio album by Francesco De Gregori
- Released: 1978
- Genre: Italian singer-songwriters
- Length: 32 min.
- Label: RCA Italia
- Producer: Ubaldo Consoli, Francesco De Gregori

Francesco De Gregori chronology
Bufalo Bill (1976)	De Gregori (1978)	Banana Republic (1979)

Professional ratings
Review scores
Source	Rating
Allmusic	4.5/5 stars

De Gregori is an album by Italian singer-songwriter Francesco De Gregori. It was released in 1978 by RCA Italia.

== The album ==
De Gregori was released after a period in which the author had retired from music, working as a clerk in a bookshop. The composition of the album's most famous track, "Generale", convinced him to return as a full-time singer-songwriter.

"Raggio di sole" is dedicated to De Gregori's recently born twins. "Due zingari" features saxophone parts by the renowned Italian jazz musician Mario Schiano.

== Track listing ==
1. "Generale" – 4:19
2. "Natale" – 2:35
3. "L'impiccato" – 3:59
4. "Babbo in prigione" – 2:10
5. "Renoir" – 2:37
6. "Renoir (seconda versione)" – 2:22
7. "Il '56" – 3:05
8. "La campana" – 3:38
9. "Raggio di sole" – 3:08
10. "Due zingari" – 4:16

All songs written by Francesco De Gregori.

== Charts ==
Chart (1978)	Peak position
Italy (Musica e dischi)	2

== Personnel ==
- Francesco De Gregori – Vocals, Producer
- Mario Scardala – Artwork
- Mario Scotti – Bass (Electric)
- George Sims – guitar
