= Automobili =

Studio album by Lucio Dalla
- Released: 1976
- Genre: Experimental music
- Label: RCA Italiana
- Producer: Renzo Cremonini

Lucio Dalla chronology
Anidride solforosa (1976)	Automobili (1976)	Com'è profondo il mare (1977)

Automobili is an album by Italian singer-songwriter Lucio Dalla, released in 1976 by RCA Italiana. It was the last work in collaboration with poet Roberto Roversi: the following LP, Com'è profondo il mare, was entirely (not only the music) written by Dalla.

The album originated from a theatrical show devised by Dalla and Roversi in 1976, entitled Il futuro dell'automobile e altre storie ("The Future of Cars and Other Stories"). However, polemics between Roversi and Italian state television RAI, as well as with Dalla himself, led to the poet's decision to sign the album with a pseudonym ("Norisso"), and to abandon the collaboration with the Bolognese musician. Some of the songs from the show were not recorded and remained unpublished, with the exception of "Ho cambiato la faccia di un Dio", which appeared in Dalla's 1990 album Cambio, with the title "Comunista".

The album was the most successful of the three written together by Dalla and Roversi, in particular for the song "Nuvolari", about 1930s race driver Tazio Nuvolari. All the songs deal in general with cars, starting from the first track, "Intervista con l'Avvocato", in which Dalla scat sings meaningless replies by FIAT owner, Gianni Agnelli, to a journalist from Manchester Guardian; this is followed by "Mille Miglia", dedicated to the eponymous race car, and by "Il motore del 2000".

== Track listing ==
1. "Intervista con l'avvocato" - 2:18
2. "Mille miglia (prima e seconda parte)" - 8:38
3. "Nuvolari" - 5:27
4. "L'ingorgo" - 6:00
5. "Il motore del 2000" - 4:25
6. "Due ragazzi" - 4:58

== Charts ==
Chart performance for Automobili
Chart (1976)	Peak position
Italian Albums (Musica e dischi)	22

== Sources ==
- Totaro, Matteo (2008). Un dialogo tra autori: Roberto Roversi e Lucio Dalla per "Automobili" (1976. Bologna: Alma Mater Studiorum.
