= Lilly (album) =

Studio album by Antonello Venditti
- Released: September 1975
- Genre: Italian singer-songwriters
- Length: 41:14 min
- Label: RCA Italia
- Producer: Antonello Venditti

Antonello Venditti chronology
Quando verrà Natale (1974)	Lilly (1975)	Ullàlla (1976)

Lilly is an album by Italian singer-songwriter Antonello Venditti, released by Rca Italian in late 1975.

All the songs are written by Antonello Venditti. It was the first album by Venditti to peak the Italian charts. The long ballad "Lo stambecco ferito", telling the story of an Italian corrupted entrepreneur who flees to Switzerland with all his money, is inspired by Felice Riva, who, after leading the Rizzoli group to bankruptcy (with the loss of 8,000 jobs), escaped to Lebanon to avoid the Italian justice system. The title track is dedicated to a drug-addicted woman.

== Track listing ==
1. "Lilly"
2. "L'amore non ha padroni"
3. "Santa Brigida"
4. "Attila e la stella"
5. "Compagno di scuola"
6. "Lo stambecco ferito"
7. "Penna a sfera"

== Charts ==
Chart (1975-6)	Highest position
Italy (Musica e dischi)	1
