= In questo mondo di ladri =

Studio album by Antonello Venditti
- Released: 1988
- Label: Heinz
- Producer: Alessandro Colombini

Antonello Venditti chronology
Venditti e Segreti (1986)	In questo mondo di ladri (1988)	Gli anni ’80 (1990)

In questo mondo di ladri (English: In this world of thieves) is an album by Italian musician Antonello Venditti. It was released in 1988 by Heinz Music to commercial success, reaching no.1 on the Italian charts and selling more than 1.5 million copies, making it one of the best selling albums in Italy of all time. The title track, "In questo mondo di ladri", was featured in the 2004 comedy of the same name.

== Track listing ==
All tracks are written by Antonello Venditti, except where noted.

No.	Title	Writer(s)	Length
1.	"Ricordati di me"		5:19
2.	"Miraggi"		5:26
3.	"Correndo correndo"		4:10
4.	"Mitico amore"	Antonello Venditti, Marco Colucci	5:23
5.	"In questo mondo di ladri"		4:50
6.	"Il compleanno di Cristina"		5:24
7.	"21 modi per dirti ti amo"	Antonello Venditti, Danilo Cherni, Maurizio Perfetto	5:06
8.	"Ma che bella giornata di sole"		4:44
Total length:			40:23

== Charts ==
Chart (1988-9)	Highest position
Italy (Musica e dischi)	1

== See also ==
- List of best-selling albums in Italy
