= L'anno che verrà =

Song by Lucio Dalla

from the album Lucio Dalla
- Released: 1979
- Label: RCA Italiana

Music video
- "L'anno che verrà" on YouTube

"L'anno che verrà" (transl. "The year to come"), also commonly known as "Caro amico ti scrivo" (transl. "Dear friend, I'm writing to you"), is a 1979 song composed and performed by Lucio Dalla.

== Overview ==
The lyrics use an epistolary form, with Dalla describing to a friend the dramatic situation in a Years of Lead-stricken Italy. The friend of the song actually was Dalla's friend Giuseppe Rossetti, a painter who at the time of the composition had been imprisoned and later discharged for terrorism. Dalla said he was inspired for the song by reading Robert Walser's novella The Walk. According to Ernesto Assante, another apparent inspiration for the song was Chico Buarque's 1976 song "Meu caro amigo".

Dalla recorded the song in Spanish (as "Querido amigo") and Portuguese (as "O ano que virá"). He also included live-versions of the song in his albums DallAmeriCaruso and Work in Progress. Artists who covered the song include Loredana Bertè, Cristina D'Avena, Cesare Cremonini, Rolf Zuckowski, Richard Clayderman, Ricchi e Poveri, Fiorella Mannoia, Riccardo Fogli, Maria Farantouri, Patxi Andión, Fiorello.

== Charts ==
Chart (2012)	Peak position
Italy (FIMI)	9
Switzerland (Schweizer Hitparade)	54

== Certifications ==
Region	Certification	Certified units/sales
Italy (FIMI) sales from 2009	2× Platinum	200,000^{‡}
^{‡} Sales+streaming figures based on certification alone.
