= Volume 8 (Fabrizio De André album) =

Studio album by Fabrizio De André
- Released: 1975
- Recorded: Milan, Ricordi studios, 1975
- Length: 32:51
- Label: Ricordi; BMG
- Producer: Roberto Dané

Fabrizio De André chronology
Canzoni (1974)	Volume 8 (1975)	Rimini (1978)

Professional ratings
Review scores
Source	Rating
Allmusic	4.5/5 stars

Volume 8 is an album released by Italian singer/songwriter Fabrizio De André. It was first issued in 1975 on Ricordi and then re-released by BMG. According to statements by De André within his posthumous autobiography "Una goccia di splendore" ["A drop of brightness"], released in 2011, his collaboration with Francesco De Gregori, which gave birth to four of the eight songs on the album, originated when De André saw his colleague live on stage in Rome and was very impressed. Afterwards, he invited De Gregori to visit him in his rural house in Sardinia, where the two of them spent a month "getting drunk together and writing songs in the meantime."

== Track listing ==
All songs written by Fabrizio De André and Francesco De Gregori, except where indicated.

1. "La Cattiva Strada" – 4:33
2. "Oceano" – 3:11
3. "Nancy" (Leonard Cohen, translation by De André) – 3:57
4. "Le Storie di ieri" (Francesco De Gregori) – 3:15
5. "Giugno '73" (De André) – 3:31
6. "Dolce Luna" – 3:25
7. "Canzone per l'estate" – 5:21
8. "Amico fragile" (De André) - 5:29

== The songs ==
All of the songs on the album marked a stylistic shift in De André's lyrics, which became more poetical, more complex and less immediate than anything he released earlier. Reviewers at the time criticized the changes and attributed them to the influence of De Gregori, who was known for writing stylized, not-readily-understandable lyrics, which he was not always able to explain. Still, "Giugno '73" and "Amico fragile" were both written by De André on his own before he met De Gregori, and feature the same linguistic and poetical depth as the rest of the album. He would return to his usual storytelling style on his next album, Rimini, co-written with the Veronese folk songwriter Massimo Bubola.

- "La cattiva strada" [literally "The bad road", but more properly rendered as "The errant way"] is about an unnamed man (or boy - his age is not explicitly defined) who corrupts various people in various situations; all of the people he meets end up following him along his "errant way". At the end of the song, however, the protagonist displays his intention to disappear for good; he warns the people around him (who see him as either purely evil or purely good) that following him is ultimately worthless, wherever he may go, and De André, identifying with him, philosophically concludes that "there is love, a little love for everyone, and everyone has a love, along the errant way."
- "Oceano" ["Ocean"] is an enigmatic, cryptic song, quite obscure and hard to interpret, whose lyrics were written by De Gregori as a dedication to Cristiano De André, Fabrizio's young son. Cristiano was fascinated by De Gregori's 1973 song "Alice", whose first lines say: "Alice looks at the cats and the cats look into the sun." When Cristiano asked De Gregori why Alice was looking at the cats and not at something else (like a streetlamp, or a bush, or a tree), the latter was unable to reply, but wrote "Oceano" instead. The song mentions a child who asks questions about green fields, rooms and the sea, possibly representing Cristiano, and a woman who is in love with a poet, a possible portrait of Dori Ghezzi.
- "Nancy" is a translated version of Leonard Cohen's song "Seems So Long Ago, Nancy", originally from his Songs from a Room album. The lyrics are about the true story of a young girl from Montréal who committed suicide.
- "Le storie di ieri" ["The stories from yesterday"], written entirely by De Gregori (who re-recorded the song on his album Rimmel in the same year, with slight differences in the text), is about the choice of fascist ideology and its subsequent transformation into the MSI (post-fascist Italian party).
- "Giugno '73" ["June '73"], one of the few songs which De André wrote entirely by himself after 1967, is a highly metaphorical and idealized account of the start of his relationship with a woman named Roberta. Autobiographical details mentioned in the lyrics include Roberta's mother's open hostility to De André, as he was "a married man, and moreover, a singer" (he was still married to Enrica "Puny" Rignon at the time), as well as Roberta's scorn of her partner's male friends, described as shabbily dressed ("All of my friends are kind to you, but their clothes look a bit weird; you tell me I should bring them to a tailor's, and you ask me: 'Are they the best ones we have tonight?' "), and (initially) of De André himself ("Just wait for a more trustworthy lover"). The writer's emotional detachment from personal subject matter is made evident here by his use of very poetical lines (e.g. in order to say that his girlfriend wears some yellow mimosa flowers in the cuff of her shirt, he says: "Now you laugh and you pour a spoonful of mimosa into the funnel of an untied cuff"), as well as a few surreal images: the first verse includes a line about the death of a magpie followed by street vendors not selling flowers that day but "talking magpies", while two lines in the second-to-last verse mention "two elephant hairs... [they] were stopping my blood flow, so I gave them to a passer-by" - elephants do not have any body hairs, except for a few on the tail, which are almost impossible to cut from the tail itself as their roots are extremely solid.
- "Dolce Luna" ["Sweet Moon"] is a portrait of an old, drunken man, possibly a former sailor, who roams the streets at night while reminiscing about a rugged and varied sea life (including a whale named "Sweet Moon"), which he may have never lived. In the last verse, the man speaks in the first person to a woman, possibly his wife, about wanting a son; he states not to care whether the boy will learn to swim or not, but he is sure that his son will be born with as big a desire for a seafaring life as his own.
- "Canzone per l'estate" ["Song for the summer"] features shared lyrics written over a previously existing piece of music by De Gregori. The words, a second-person autobiographical portrait of De André as seen by someone else, describe the tension between the bourgeois life he grew up in and lived much of his life in, and his attraction to anarchism and to society's outcasts, who seemed to him more genuine and alive than the upper classes.
- "Amico fragile" ["Frail friend"], also written entirely by De André, is a detached and cynical account, delivered through seemingly unconnected images in the form of a stream of consciousness monologue, of an evening De André spent with a group of friends, during which everybody (including himself) got drunk; the singer-songwriter was forced to sing in spite of him not really wanting to, and, in his intoxicated state, exposed all of his friends' vices and defects in an improvised bawdy song, interspersed with a series of truthful but unpleasant spoken comments; later on, when his friends had left, he retreated into his garage and wrote the song in a few minutes on the basis of those comments, some of which were incorporated into the final lyrics without any changes. (e.g. "Do you know I've lost two children?" "Lady, you are a pretty distracted woman!") The title, an unnamed friend's depiction of De André as an extremely sensitive and needful person, has since become a common way to identify De André himself, especially in the various tributes produced after his death.

== Personnel ==
- Tony Mimms - Arrangements, Orchestral conducting
- Fabrizio De André - Guitars, Vocals
- Gigi Cappellotto - Bass
- Andy Surdi - Drums
- Oscar Rocchi - Keyboards
- Carmelo & Michelangelo La Bionda - Guitars
- Claudio Bazzari - Guitars
- Ernesto Verardi - Guitars
