= Harold Bradley Sr. =

American football player (1905–1973)

No. 22
- Position: Guard

Personal information
- Born: September 7, 1905; Coffeyville, Kansas
- Died: November 30, 1973 (aged 68); Chicago
- Listed weight: 185 lb (84 kg)

Career information
- High school: Chicago (IL) Englewood
- College: Iowa

Career history
- Chicago Cardinals (1928)

Awards and highlights
- Second African-American lineman in NFL history (1928)
- Stats at Pro Football Reference

Harold "Hal" Willard Bradley Sr. (September 27, 1905 – November 30, 1973) was an American football player for the Chicago Cardinals in 1928. Bradley was one of only 13 black players to play in the National Football League prior to World War II and just the second black lineman in the history of the NFL, following Duke Slater. He played collegiately at the University of Iowa in 1926 and was the father of Harold Bradley Jr., who also played in the NFL.

== Childhood ==
Harold Willard Bradley, more commonly known as "Hal", was born in Coffeyville, Kansas, in 1905. He was the son of Arthur Bradley, a Chicago, Rock Island and Pacific Railroad barber, and his wife, Mamie. Hal Bradley moved with his family to Chicago when he was a boy, and he was raised in Chicago's West Woodlawn neighborhood on the city's south side. He attended Englewood High School and was named all-state as a member of the school's football team. Upon graduation, Bradley enrolled at the University of Iowa.

== University of Iowa ==
Bradley attended the University of Iowa in 1926 and joined the football team. Following in the footsteps of Iowa's Duke Slater, Bradley became one of the few blacks playing college football at the time. Although he never earned a varsity letter at Iowa, Bradley's athletic participation at the University of Iowa helped the school create a reputation as a "safe haven" for black athletes. Bradley left the University of Iowa before graduation after being offered a job as a postal carrier.

== Chicago Cardinals ==
Duke Slater took notice of Bradley when Bradley was playing football for the University of Iowa. In 1928, Slater encouraged his Chicago Cardinals team to give Bradley a shot at a roster spot, and Bradley made the team. Hal Bradley started one game for the Chicago Cardinals in 1928 and played in two games, which made him the second black lineman in NFL history, after Slater himself. (p 115)

Bradley was one of only 13 blacks to compete in the NFL before World War II. Unfortunately, a childhood injury – which resulted in a steel plate being placed in his leg – contributed to the end of Bradley's NFL career. Bradley played only two games in the NFL, the shortest career of any black player prior to World War II.(p 196)

== Personal life ==
Harold Bradley Sr. worked for most of his life as a postal carrier and appliance salesman. He married Hattie Ruth Clay, a Chicago native, in 1927. Together, they had two children: Pauline and Harold Jr.

Harold Bradley Jr. followed in his father's footsteps, first at the University of Iowa and then in the NFL. The Bradleys became the first black father-son combination to play for the Hawkeye football team, and Harold Bradley Jr. was named the University of Iowa's team MVP in 1950. Harold Bradley Jr. then followed his father into the NFL, becoming the first black father-son combination in NFL history; Harold Jr. played four NFL seasons from 1954 to 1958.

Hal Bradley died in Chicago in 1973 following a heart attack and was interred in Burr Oak Cemetery, Alsip, Illinois.
