= Roma capoccia =

Single by Antonello Venditti

from the album Theorius Campus
- B-side: "Ciao uomo"
- Released: 1972
- Length: 4:48
- Label: It
- Songwriter: Antonello Venditti
- Producers: Lilli Greco and Paolo Dossena

Antonello Venditti singles chronology
"Roma capoccia" (1972)	"L'orso bruno" (1973)

Audio
- "Roma capoccia" on YouTube

"Roma capoccia" ('Hardheaded Rome') is a 1972 Italian song composed and performed by Antonello Venditti. It is included in the album Theorius Campus.

The breakout song of Venditti, it was originally composed in 1964, when Venditti was only 14 years old. A tribute to Venditti's hometown Rome, the song's lyrics alternate scenes of everyday life to the celebration of Rome's imposing monuments of the imperial and medieval age. Initially released as B-side of "Ciao uomo", was eventually swapped as A-side when it became a radio hit, mainly thanks to the heavy rotation in the popular radio show Supersonic. Because of the success of the song, after a few years the album Theorius Campus was re-released as Roma capoccia.

Artists who covered the song include Wall Street Crash, Claudio Villa, Schola Cantorum and Vianella. The song was included in the soundtrack of the 1977 poliziottesco film Brothers Till We Die.

== Track listing ==
No.	Title	Writer(s)	Length
1.	"Roma capoccia"	Antonello Venditti	4:48
2.	"Ciao uomo"	Edmondo Giuliani, Antonello Venditti	5:07

== Charts ==
Chart performance for "Roma capoccia"
Chart (1972–1973)	Peak position
Italy (Musica e dischi)	17
