= Lilly (song) =

Single by Antonello Venditti

from the album Lilly
- B-side: "Compagno di scuola"
- Released: 1975
- Length: 4:55
- Label: RCA Italiana
- Songwriter(s): Antonello Venditti

Antonello Venditti singles chronology
"Roma (non si discute, si ama)" (1975)	"Lilly" (1975)	"Maria Maddalena" (1976)

Audio
- "Lilly" on YouTube

"Lilly" is a 1975 Italian song composed and performed by Antonello Venditti, lead single of the eponymous album.

The song tells the story of a friend of Venditti from Milan who died of a heroin overdose. At the time of its release, it raised several controversities because of the crudeness of the lyrics. The song proved to be a surprise hit, definitively launching Venditti's career. In spite of being one of Venditti's major hits, Venditti rarely performs the song live, and only in Milan.

== Track listing ==
No.	Title	Writer(s)	Length
1.	"Lilly"	Antonello Venditti	4:55
2.	"Compagno di scuola"	Venditti	6:00

== Charts ==
Chart (1972–1973)	Peak position
Italy (Musica e dischi)	2
