= Theorius Campus =

Studio album by Antonello Venditti and Francesco De Gregori
- Released: December 1973
- Length: 40:15
- Label: It
- Producer: Paolo Dossena and Italo Greco

Antonello Venditti chronology
Theorius Campus (1972)	L'orso bruno (1973)

Francesco De Gregori chronology
Theorius Campus (1972)	Alice non lo sa (1973)

Theorius Campus is the debut album by Italian singer-songwriters Antonello Venditti and Francesco De Gregori. Released by It in 1972, it marks the first and only collaborative project for both artists, who later decided to embark on solo careers. Although De Gregori and Venditti played on the whole album, they only share vocal duties on two songs, "Dolce signora che bruci" and "In mezzo alla città", alternating as lead vocalist in all the others.

De Gregori and Venditti made a deliberate decision of not having their names mentioned on the front cover, which shows a painting of Ophelia by English painter John Everett Millais.

== Track list ==
1. "Ciao uomo" (lyrics by Antonello Venditti; music by Roberto Giuliani and Antonello Venditti)
2. "Signora Aquilone" (lyrics and music by Francesco De Gregori)
3. "La cantina" (lyrics and music by Antonello Venditti)
4. "È caduto l'inverno" (lyrics and music by Antonello Venditti)
5. "Dolce signora che bruci" (lyrics and music by Francesco De Gregori)
6. "La casa del pazzo" (lyrics Francesco De Gregori; music by Giorgio Lo Cascio )
7. "Vocazione 1 and 1/2" (lyrics and music by Antonello Venditti and Francesco De Gregori)
8. "L'amore è come il tempo" (lyrics and music by Antonello Venditti)
9. "In mezzo alla città" (lyrics and music by Antonello Venditti and Francesco De Gregori)
10. "Roma Capoccia" (lyrics and music by Antonello Venditti)
11. "Little Snoring Willy" (lyrics and music by Francesco De Gregori)
12. "Sora Rosa" (lyrics by Antonello Venditti; music by Roberto Giuliani and Antonello Venditti)

== Personnel ==
- Francesco De Gregori: guitar, vocals
- Antonello Venditti: piano, vocals
- Paolo Dossena: keyboards
- Italo Greco: keyboards
- Maurizio Giammarco: flute
- Giorgio Lo Cascio: guitar
- Dave Sumner: guitar
- Douglas Meakin: guitar
- Mick Brill: bass
- Derek Wilson: drums
