= Banana Republic (album) =

Live album by Francesco De Gregori and Lucio Dalla
- Released: 1979
- Recorded: 1979
- Studio: Manor Mobile
- Genre: Avant-rock, Folk
- Label: RCA Italia
- Producer: Alessandro Colombini

Francesco De Gregori chronology
De Gregori (1978)	Banana Republic (1979)	Viva l'Italia (1979)

Lucio Dalla chronology
Lucio Dalla (1978)	Banana Republic (1979)	Lucio Dalla (1980)

Banana Republic (1979) is a live album by Italian singer-songwriters Francesco De Gregori and Lucio Dalla. It was recorded during their tour of 1979 and released by RCA Italia. Ron collaborated to the arrangements, and also was present as singer in the film shot during the tour.

== Track listing ==
1. "Banana Republic"
2. "Un gelato al limon"
3. "La canzone di Orlando"
4. "Bufalo Bill"
5. "Piazza Grande"
6. "4/3/1943"
7. "Santa Lucia"
8. "Quattro cani"
9. "Addio a Napoli"
10. "Ma come fanno i marinai"

== Personnel ==
- Francesco De Gregori: guitar, vocals
- Ricky Portera, George Sims: guitars, backing vocals
- Ron: piano, guitar, backing vocals
- Gaetano Curreri: piano, Hammond organ, mellotron
- Fabio Liberatori: Minimoog, Fender Rhodes
- Giovanni Pezzoli: drums, percussion
- Franco Di Stefano: drums, percussion
- Lucio Dalla: sax, clarinet, piano, vocals
- Marco Nanni: bass, backing vocals

== Charts ==
Chart performance for Lucio Dalla
Chart (1979–1980)	Peak position
Italian Albums (Musica e dischi)	1
