= Terra di nessuno =

Studio album by Francesco De Gregori
- Released: 1987
- Genre: Italian singer-songwriters
- Length: 37:38 min.
- Label: CBS

Francesco De Gregori chronology
Scacchi e tarocchi (1985)	Terra di nessuno (1987)	Mira Mare 19.4.89 (1989)

Terra di nessuno is an album by the Italian singer-songwriter Francesco De Gregori, released in 1987.

The song "Mimì sarà" was later sung by Mia Martini.

== Track listing ==
All songs by Francesco De Gregori.

1. "Il canto delle sirene"
2. "Pilota di guerra"
3. "Capatàz"
4. "Pane e castagne"
5. "Nero"
6. "Mimì sarà"
7. "Spalle larghe"
8. "I matti"
9. "Vecchia valigia"

== Charts ==
Chart (1987–1988)	Peak position
Italy (Musica e dischi)	12
