= Le cose della vita =

Studio album by Antonello Venditti
- Released: December 1973
- Genre: Italian singer-songwriters
- Label: RCA Italia
- Producer: Antonello Venditti

Antonello Venditti chronology
L'orso bruno (1973)	Le cose della vita (1973)	Quando verrà Natale (1975)

Le cose della vita (The Things of Life) is an album by Italian singer-songwriter Antonello Venditti, released by RCA Italian in late 1973. The record is a true "solo" venture, as Venditti wrote, arranged, produced and played every note himself.

== Track listing ==
- All songs written and arranged by Antonello Venditti.
1. "Mio padre ha un buco in gola" (My father has a hole in his throat")
2. "Mariù"
3. "Brucia Roma" (Rome Burns)
4. "Le cose della vita"
5. "E li ponti so' soli" (And the Bridges are Alone)
6. "Il treno delle sette" (The 7:00 Train)
7. "Stupida signora" (Stupid Lady)
8. "Le tue mani su di me" (Your hands on me)
