= Seven Rebel Gladiators =

- Directed by: Michele Lupo
- Written by: Lionello De Felice; Ernesto Gastaldi
- Produced by: Elio Scardamaglia
- Starring: Roger Browne; José Greci
- Cinematography: Sandro Mancori
- Edited by: Alberto Gallitti
- Music by: Francesco De Masi
- Release date: 1965
- Running time: 90 minutes
- Country: Italy
- Language: Italian

Seven Rebel Gladiators (Italian: Sette contro tutti, lit. 'Seven against all') is a 1965 Italian sword-and-sandal film directed by Michele Lupo.

== Plot ==
Vadius, a Roman tribune wants to take hold of the kingdom of Aristea, by marrying the king's daughter Assuer. Marco, a centurion, opposes Vadius but is then sent to jail and then to a gladiator fight in which Radius expects him to be killed. But Marco makes friends with his 6 gladiator opponents in the fight. Together they fight against members of a cult called Kiva, who are on Vadius's side.

== Cast ==
- Roger Browne as Marcus Aulus (as Roger Brown)
- José Greci as Assuer (as Liz Havilland)
- Alfio Caltabiano as Vadius (as Al Northon)
- Harold Bradley as Tucos
- Mario Novelli as Physios (as Anthony Freeman)
- Erno Crisa as Morakeb
- Carlo Tamberlani as King Krontal (as Bud Stevenson)
- Arnaldo Fabrizio as Goliath (as Little Goliath)
- Pietro Tordi (as Peter Barclay)
