= Generale (song) =

1978 single by Francesco De Gregori

Single by Francesco De Gregori

from the album De Gregori
- Released: 1978
- Length: 4:30
- Label: RCA Italiana

Francesco De Gregori singles chronology
"Bufalo Bill" (1976)	"Generale" (1978)	"Ma come fanno i marinai" (1979)

Audio
- "Generale" on YouTube

"Generale" ('General') is a song by Italian singer Francesco De Gregori, released in 1978.

== Overview ==
De Gregori composed the song after a period of personal crisis, during which he had opened a bookstore, having decided to leave the music industry. The song tells the story of a General returning from war, and has been variously interpreted, including as a metaphor of De Gregori's return to music, or as a symbolic retreat from political and social engagement toward personal intimacy, or as shift from the hermeticism of his earlier works to a lighter and more immediate impressionist style.

De Gregori drew inspiration for the lyrics from a variety of sources, with primary influence from Louis-Ferdinand Céline's semi-autobiographical novel Journey to the End of the Night, alongside Ernest Hemingway's A Farewell to Arms and Mario Monicelli's film The Great War. The production of the song lasted two weeks, with De Gregori recording about 15 different versions of the song and being constantly dissatisfied with them; as he recalled, in the end 'I took one of these versions that I had discarded and said "OK, let's get this one out"'. Over the years, he eventually recorded 11 different versions of the song, varying from bolero to folk style.

Artists who covered the song include Vasco Rossi, Fiorello, Anastasio, Jimmy Cobb Trio, and Benny Neyman in a Dutch-language version titled "Jouw Verhalen".

== Track listing ==
No.	Title	Writer(s)	Length
1.	"Generale"	De Gregori	4:30
2.	"Natale"	De Gregori	2:34

== Charts ==
Chart (1978)	Peak position
Italy (Musica e dischi)	4

== Certifications ==
Region	Certification	Certified units/sales
Italy (FIMI) Sales from 2009	Platinum	50,000^{‡}
^{‡} Sales+streaming figures based on certification alone.
