= Sergio Caputo =

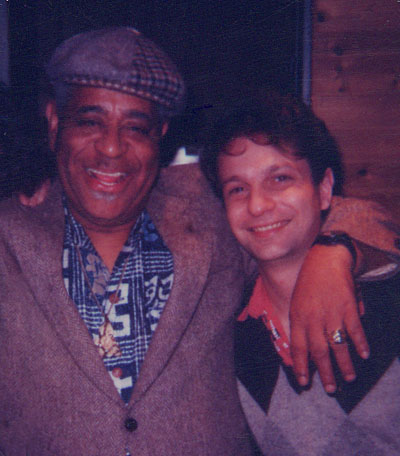
- Caputo with Dizzy Gillespie

Background information
- Born: August 31, 1954 (age 71); Rome, Italy
- Genres: Jazz, Latin-jazz pop
- Occupations: Singer, writer, composer
- Instruments: Guitar, vocals

Sergio Caputo (born 31 August 1954) is an Italian singer-songwriter, composer, and guitarist.

Born in Rome, while a university student Caputo started performing in Roman clubs, notably Folkstudio. After getting a degree in architecture and while working as an art director in advertising agency, Caputo began a parallel musical career, releasing a single in 1978 and an eponym EP in 1981. He had his breakout with "Un sabato italiano", the leading song of his eponymous debut album, which was released in 1983. It presented a style that combined jazz (with models like Cole Porter and Fats Waller), Latin-jazz pop and 1950s Italian swing along the lines of Natalino Otto and Fred Buscaglione. Dizzy Gillespie was a guest in two songs in his 1986 album Effetti personali. He participated in the Sanremo Music Festival three times, in 1987, 1989 and 1998.

Over his recording career, he produced 14 albums where he continued his experimentation of musical and lyrical expression, as both an author and producer, as well as a guitarist and performer.

He also collaborated with many renewed musicians, including Lester Bowie, Tony Scott, Mel Collins (King Crimson), Tony Bowers (Simply Red), Enrico Rava and Danilo Rea.

In 2003, he released "That Kind of Thing", a guitar-based Smooth Jazz album recorded in California.

In 2008, he published his first book "Disperatamente, e in ritardo cane" (Desperately, and dog-late) - Mondadori. The book is about a faded Italian pop star - living in California - who goes back to Italy every now and then for a tour. Until this one time, he loses his American passport and gets stuck in his old wild life.

In 2009, he released, on his new label Alcatraz Moon, the live album "La notte è un pazzo con le mêches", with his band, the Sergio Caputo Quintet experience.

In 2013, he released the 30º anniversary remake of his first album - Un Sabato Italiano 30 - which redefines Sergio Caputo's style back to his jazzy roots. He also writes a "reality" book titled "Un Sabato Italiano Memories" (Mondadori) about the years when he - a young art director in a big advertising agency - was torn between his day job and his passion for music.

In 2015, he released his first work of brand new songs in many years, Pop Jazz and Love. The album is about "happy love" and is entirely in English, but for one song. The style is jazz with a twist of Latino.

In 2016, he started a collaboration with Francesco Baccini, and together they toured and released the single "Non Fidarti di Me" (Do Not Trust Me). In 2017, they released the album Chewing Gum Blues.

== Discography ==
=== Album ===
- 1981 - Sergio Caputo (Q Disc) (Dischi Ricordi, EPL 5002)
- 1983 - Un sabato italiano (CGD)
- 1984 - Italiani mambo (CGD)
- 1985 - No smoking (CGD)
- 1986 - Effetti personali (CGD)
- 1987 - Ne approfitto per fare un po' di musica (live) (CGD)
- 1988 - Storie di whisky andati (CGD)
- 1989 - Lontano che vai (CGD)
- 1990 - Sogno erotico sbagliato (Fonit Cetra)
- 1993 - Egomusicocefalo (CGD)
- 1996 - I Love Jazz
- 1998 - Serenadas
- 2003 - That kind of thing
- 2006 - A tu per tu
- 2009 - La notte è un pazzo con le mèches LIVE (Alcatraz Moon)

=== Official compilation ===
- 1990 - Swing & soda: il meglio di Sergio Caputo
- 1998 - Cocktail

=== Cover ===
- 2009 - Piji e Masquèra strapazzano Caputo (ALCATRAZ MOON)

=== Single ===
- 1978 - Libertà dove sei / Giorno di festa (IT, ZBT 7098)
- 1983 - Un sabato italiano / Spicchio di luna (CGD)
- 1983 - Bimba se sapessi / Mercy bocù (CGD)
- 1985 - L'astronave che arriva / Scubidù (maxi single) (CGD)
- 1987 - Il Garibaldi innamorato / Flamenco amorespia (CGD)
- 1989 - Rifarsi una vita / Anche i detective piangono (CGD)
- 2009 - On a Lonely Night (ALCATRAZ MOON)
