= Harold Bradley Jr. =

American football player and actor (1929–2021)

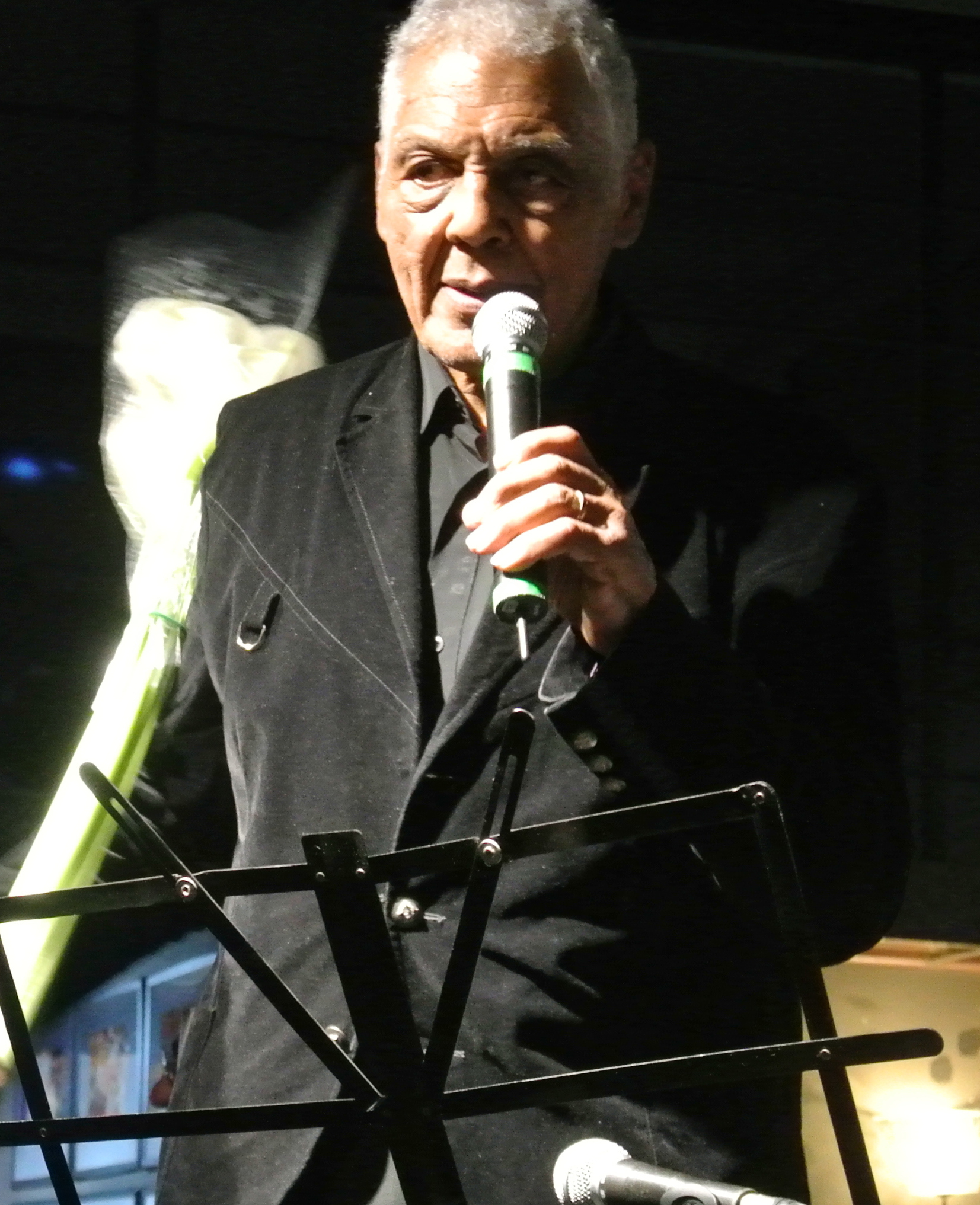
- Bradley Jr. in 2014

Profile
- Position: Guard

Personal information
- Born: October 13, 1929; Chicago, Illinois, U.S.
- Died: April 13, 2021 (aged 91); Rome, Italy
- Listed height: 6 ft 2 in (1.88 m)
- Listed weight: 230 lb (104 kg)

Career information
- High school: Englewood (IL)
- College: Iowa
- NFL draft: 1951: undrafted

Career history
- Cleveland Browns (1954–1956); Philadelphia Eagles (1958)
- Stats at Pro Football Reference

Harold Willard Bradley Jr. (October 13, 1929 – April 13, 2021) was an American professional football player, actor, singer, and visual artist. He played college football for the Iowa Hawkeyes and played four seasons in the National Football League (NFL) from 1954–1958. He later starred in over 25 Italian films as an actor and opened an art and music studio in Rome.

== Childhood ==
Harold Bradley Jr. was born in Chicago, and grew up in the West Woodlawn neighborhood on Chicago's south side. His father, Harold Bradley Sr., was one of 13 African-Americans to participate in the NFL before World War II, playing for the Chicago Cardinals in 1928. Like his father before him, Harold Bradley Jr. played football at Englewood High School in Chicago and enrolled at the University of Iowa after graduation.

== University of Iowa ==
By joining the Hawkeyes football team, Harold Bradley Jr. completed the first African-American father-son combination to play football for the University of Iowa; his father played for the Hawkeyes in 1926. Bradley Jr. was one of five African-Americans to play for the Hawkeye football team in 1950, when the team finished the season with a road game at the University of Miami. Bradley and his four African-American teammates, nicknamed the "Orange Bowl Five", became the first African-Americans to play at the historic Orange Bowl stadium, a contest won by Miami, 14-6.

Bradley capped his Hawkeye football career by being named team MVP of the 1950 Iowa football team. He graduated from Iowa in 1951 with a degree in fine arts.

== Professional football ==
After leaving Iowa, Bradley served for three years in the U.S. Marines. He played football for a team called the Marine Corps Recruit Depot San Diego Devil Dogs from 1951–1953, where he was discovered by a coach for the Cleveland Browns. (Note: Reference wrongly refers to the "San Diego Bulldogs" when in reality it is the MCRD San Diego Devil Dogs) Bradley then played three seasons for the Cleveland Browns from 1954–1956, winning NFL championships with the team in 1954 and 1955. He finished his pro football career with the Philadelphia Eagles in 1958.

By playing four seasons of pro football in the 1950s, Bradley joined with his father to complete the first African-American father-son combination to ever play in the NFL.

== Artistic career, television host and movie roles ==
Bradley earned a scholarship in 1959 to study at the University for Foreigners of Perugia in Italy. He then opened an art studio in Rome named Folkstudio in 1962. During the day, Bradley used the studio to display his paintings while turning it into a jazz club in the evenings. Several prominent musicians, including Bob Dylan and Pete Seeger, would go on to perform at Folkstudio.

Bradley also broke into acting in 1960, landing a role the following year in the film Barabbas. He would star in more than a dozen Italian films over the next seven years, mostly in the sword-and-sandal genre. Bradley's cinematic work during this time included notable roles in two 1965 films: Tucos in Sette contro tutti (Seven Rebel Gladiators) and George Harris in La capanna dello zio Tom (Uncle Tom's Cabin).

In 1968, Bradley moved back to the United States after accepting a job as a curator for the Illinois Arts Council, in Chicago. He went on to teach history of education at the University of Illinois at Urbana–Champaign and work with the university's Center for Upgrading Education Services (CUES) in its extension projects with local Champaign schools. Later, he took on a posting at the Illinois State Board of Education, in Springfield, producing instructional and educational television.

During the 18 years he spent commuting between Champaign, Illinois and Springfield, Illinois he produced and hosted three prime-time public-affairs shows – Soul Side, Close-Up for the CBS affiliate and "People Beat" for the NBC affiliate. Race and intercultural issues were the main focus of his interviews.

During the next two decades, Bradley also made occasional appearances in movies and on television.

Bradley visited Italy in 1987 to celebrate the 25th anniversary of Folkstudio, and he soon decided to take up permanent residence there. After returning to Italy, Bradley made a few more film appearances, mostly in Italian films but also a small role in the movie Daylight, starring Sylvester Stallone. He also appeared on six albums of spiritual- and folk-inspired music.

== Personal life ==
Bradley resided in Rome, Italy. He and his wife Hannelore have two daughters, Michaela and Lea, and a son, Oliver.

== Special collaboration ==
Lionel Hampton, Pete Seeger, Totò Torquati, Luca Casagrande, Annette Meriweather, Jho Jenkins, Tony Scott, Juliette Gréco, Gianni Morandi, Nanni Loy, Gordon Scott, Pina Cei, Mark Forest, Thomas Fritsch, John Kitzmiller, Alfredo Kraus, Eduardo Sola-Franco, Géza von Radványi, Anthony Quinn, Jack Palance, Elizabeth Taylor

== Recognition and prizes ==
- Engelwood High School – Most Valuable Player and Team Captain, varsity football
- University of Iowa – Most Valuable Player, varsity football (1950), Distinguished Alumni Award (2021)
- Pro Football Hall of Fame recognition as first African-American father-son combination in the NFL, alongside father, Harold W. Bradley, Sr. (1978)
- Ingersoll Art Award (1940)
- Medaglia in Bronzo con Incisa la Lupa Capitolina, dal Comune di Roma – in riconoscimento per la fondazione del Folkstudio e del contributo allo sviluppo ed internazionalizzazione della vita culturale e musicale italiana (luglio 2012)
- Lapide commemorativa posta sulla facciata del edificio Via Garibaldi 58, Roma, luogo natale del Folkstudio, dal Comune di Roma (luglio 2012)

== Working history ==
- McGraw Hill.
- Illinois Arts Council. Curator. 1968
- University of Illinois at Urbana Champaign / CUES
- Illinois Sesquicentennial Commission. 1968
- Illinois State Board of Education. Superintendent for Public Instruction, Educational and Instructional Television Department. Producer

== Performing artist ==
=== Cinema ===
- La tragica notte di Assisi, (1960)
- Barabbas, (1961)
- Io, Semiramide, servo di Semiramide (1962)
- Maciste il gladiatore più forte del mondo, (1962)
- Il gladiatore di Roma, (1962)
- Cleopatra, (1963)
- Maciste l'eroe più grande del mondo, (1963)
- L'eroe di Babilonia, (1963)
- Jason and the Argonauts, (1963)
- Tarzak contro gli uomini leopardo, (1964)
- Maciste nell'inferno di Gengis Khan, (1964)
- La caduta dell'impero romano, (1964)
- La capanna dello zio Tom, Harris (1965)
- Sette contro tutti, uno dei sette gladiatori (1965)
- Missione apocalisse, King Joe (1966)
- Per amore... per magia..., Genio Hassan (1967)
- Troppo per vivere... poco per morire, (1967)
- I giorni della violenza, Nathan (1967)
- Sing Sing chiama Wall Street, (1987)
- Pacco, doppio pacco e contropaccotto, (1993)
- Daylight – Trappola nel tunnel, Police Chief (1996)
- Memsaab, (1996)
- Solo x te, Angelo del Supermercato (film TV) (1998)
- Gangs of New York, menestrello (2002)
- In ascolto, esaminatore del poligrafo (2006)
- The Same Love – l'Amore è Uguale Per Tutti, (2010)
- Habemus Papam, Cardinale (2011)
- Miss Wolf and the Lamb, (cortometraggio) (2011)
- YouTube Playlist: Harold Bradley – Cinema. Compiled by Oliver Bradley

=== Television series ===
- La donna di fiori, barman parts 1, 4, 5, 6, (1965)
- La fiera della vanità, Sambo nella part #1.1, (1967)
- The Chisholms, servant parts 1, 2, 3, 4, (1979)
- Valeria medico legale, with C.Koll 2nd season, 1st part Bentornata Valeria, (2002)
- Questa Sera parla Mark Twain with P. Stoppa
- Il grande coltello with M. Girotti

=== Theater ===
- Tango (1966–67)
- L'avvenimento (1966–67)
- Shakespeare in Harlem, by Langston Hughes
- Mister Jazz, by L. Hughes
- The Dutchman, by LeRoi Jones. Directed by S. Zacharias
- La Putain Respectuese, by Jean-Paul Sartre
- Arriva l'uomo del Ghiaccio. Directed by L. Squarzina
- Il Volpone, by Ben Jonson
- Purlie. Musical. Directed by G. Romans
- A Spasso con Daisy (Driving with Miss Daisy). Co-protagonist with Pina Cei
- Se non ci fosse la Luna. Musical
- La città di Dio. Directed by M.Prosperi

=== Discography ===
- Mbatha-Opasha's Voices of Glory. (1993). Come On And Praise. Featuring Mbatha-Opasha, Harold Bradley, Annette Meriwether and Jho Jhenkins. (Editore S.P.A.V.)
- Mbatha-Opasha's Voices of Glory. (1996). Thank you Lord. Featuring Mbatha-Opasha, Harold Bradley, Annette Meriwether and Jho Jhenkins. (Paoline Edizioni). EAN 8019118020246
- St. John Singers Spirituals-Gospels Chorus. (1998). Black and White Together. Featuring Harold Bradley and Joy Garrison. (ISMA Music Group – Edizioni Musicali).
- Associazione Eleniana & InterSOS. (2004). Harold Bradley & Sat&B Gospel Choir. Khumba ya my Lord – Together for Darfur / Insieme per Darfur. Vietato Chiudere Gli Occhi / Don't Close Your Eyes. (Edizione Eleniana).
- Jona's Blues Band. (2010) Back to Life Sifare. Special Guest: Harold Bradley (Edizioni Musicali / Believe Digital).
- Harold Bradley. (2012). Live al Cafè Latino. (Casa discografica TERRE SOMMERSE).
- YouTube Playlist: Harold Bradley – Music. Compiled by Oliver Bradley

=== Television host ===
- Close-Up – WCIA – Channel 3 (CBS) 1969–1975
- Soul Side WCIA – Channel 3 (CBS) 1970–1975
- People Beat – WICD – Channel 15 (NBC) 1975–1980

=== Special TV appearance ===
- Folkstudio: Harold Bradley. Claudio Villa Notti Romane RAI TV 1965

=== Publicity ===
- Video on YouTube Carrera occhiali (2011)

== Bibliography ==
- Jet (magazine). XXII, No. 12 (July 12, 1962), Ex-Pro Gridder-Artist Harold Bradley Tries Flicks. "Barabbas" p. 61
- Time magazine – Folk Singers: For the Love of It – Harold Bradley. Friday, April 10, 1964
- Ebony Magazine. Vol. XX, No. 11 (September 1965). Young Man With Worlds to Conquer: Harold Bradley. p. 119-125
- Jet (magazine). XXXII, No. 13 (July 6, 1967), Harold Bradley: Cleveland Browns. LeRoi Jones "Dutchman". p. 28
- Ebony Magazine. Vol. XXIV, No. 12 (October 1969). Football Heroes Invade Hollywood. p. 195-202.
- Jet (magazine). Vol. 54, No. 12 (June 8, 1978), Black Alumni Honor University of Iowa Pioneers. Harold Bradley artwork. p. 17
- Volpi, Gianna. (1982). Spoleto Story. p. 126. (Edizione Rusconi).
- Bianchi, Carlo Vittorio (1984). Umbria Per Vivere. "Harold". p. 247-255. (Edizione Grafica Salvi, Perugia).
- Saint John's Spirituals Gospel Choir. (2001). I Nostri Dieci Anni di Musica. (Edizione Cantiere dell'Arte). SBN RMS0181768.
- Lancia, Enrico. Melelli, Fabio. (2006) Dizionario del Cinema Italiano. Vol. 4: Attori Stranieri del Nostro Cinema. "Bradley Harold". p. 37-38. (Gremese Editore). ISBN 978-8-88440-425-1.
- Piascik, Andy. (2006). The Best Show in Football: The 1946–1955 Cleveland Browns Pro Football's Greatest Dynasty. Harold Bradley. p. 265, 294, 305, 310, 382, 369. (Taylor Trade Publishers). ISBN 978-1-58979-360-6
- Bari, Sandro. (2007). Strenna dei Romanisti: Natale di Roma LXVIII: La Musica Popolare di Roma. "Nascita del Folkstudio". p. 19-30. (Edizione Roma Amor 1980).
- Polk, Rev Robert L.. Greene, Cheryll Y. (2008). Tight Little Island: Chicago's West Woodlawn Neighborhood, 1900–1950, in the Words of Its Inhabitants. (Bronx, New York : CNG Editions). ISBN 978-0-97165-091-6.
- Piascik, Andy. (2009). Gridiron Gauntlet: The Story of the Men Who Integrated Pro Football, In Their Own Words. "Harold Bradley". p. 6-7, 169-186 (Taylor Trade Publishers).ISBN 978-1-58979-652-2.
- Carrera, Alessandro. Sheehy, Colleen Josephine. Swiss, Thomas. (2009). Highway 61 Revisited: Bob Dylan's Road from Minnesota to the World. "On The Streets of Rome". p. 88-89. (Univ of Minnesota Press). ISBN 978-0816661008
- George, Nelson. (February 2010). The Black Atlas. Harold Bradley On Rome. Video interview.
- Leatherheads of the Gridiron. African-Americans in Pro Football, 1897–1946. Harold Bradley Sr and son, Harold Bradley Jr.
- Rozendaal, Neal. (2012) Duke Slater: Pioneering Black NFL Player and Judge. Harold Bradley Sr, p 115-116 and 146, Harold Bradley Jr, p. 115 and 161. ISBN 978-0786469574.
- , Mad Ducks & Bears - Football Revisited, by George Plimpton: reference to Harold Bradley's size, e-book, end of chapter 17.
- Gussmag, Sina. (2012). Freie Üniversität Berlin, Praktikumsprojekt. Kurzbiografie über Harold Bradley. (Berlin).
- Bradley, Oliver Quinn. (2013). Research Project Harold Bradley. (Berlin).
