= Roberto Roversi =

Italian poet, writer and journalist (1923–2012)

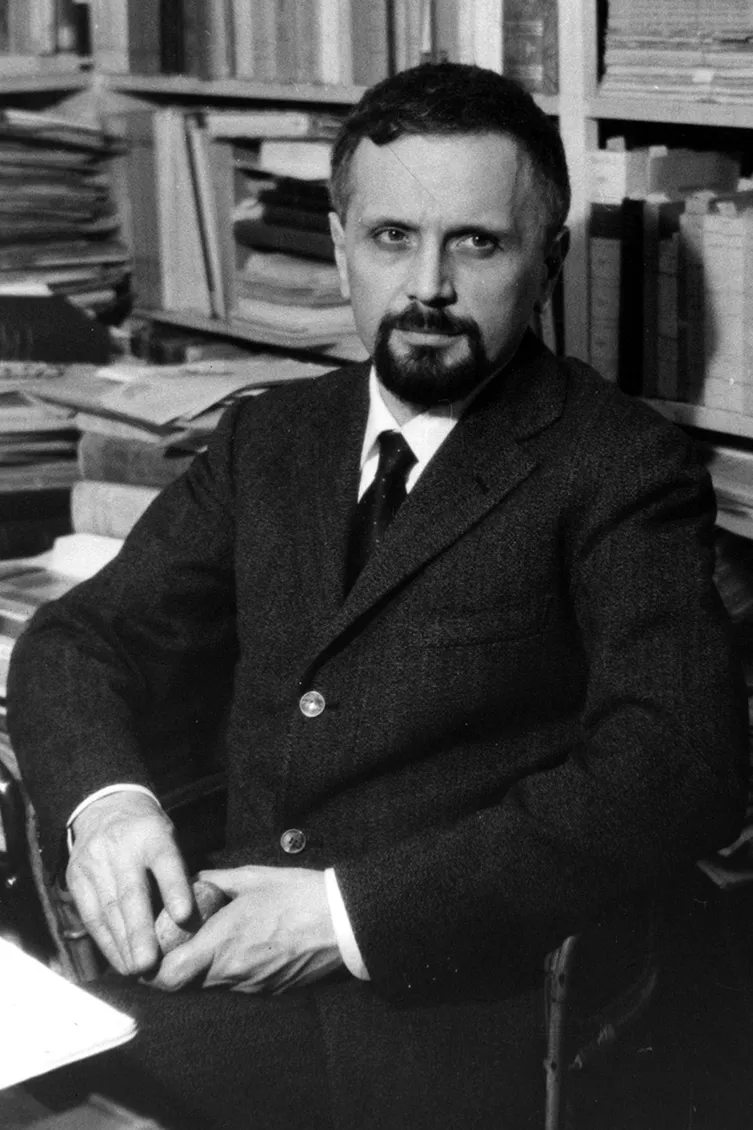
- Born: 28 January 1923; Bologna, Emilia-Romagna, Italy
- Died: 14 September 2012 (aged 89); Bologna, Emilia-Romagna, Italy
- Occupations: Poet; writer; journalist

Roberto Roversi (28 January 1923 – 14 September 2012) was an Italian poet, writer and journalist.

== Biography ==
Born in Bologna, he participated as an adolescent in the Italian resistance movement in Piedmont. From 1948 to 2006, he managed the antiquarian bookshop Libreria Palmaverda in Bologna.

In 1955, together with Francesco Leonetti and Pier Paolo Pasolini, he founded the magazine Officina. In 1961 he started another literary magazine, Rendiconti. In the same period, Roversi decided to stop selling his works to large publishers, and distributed them autonomously, often in amateur printing editions.

In the early 1970s, Roversi edited the far-left newspaper Lotta Continua. In 1973–1976, Roversi wrote lyrics for three albums by fellow Bolognese musician Lucio Dalla: Il giorno aveva cinque teste, Anidride solforosa and Automobili, the latter under the pseudonym Norisso. He also wrote lyrics for the Bolognese band Stadio, including "Chiedi chi erano i Beatles". His song "Anidride solforosa" was sung in the 1990s also by Francesco De Gregori and Angela Baraldi.

Roversi died in 2012 in Bologna.

== Sources ==
- Torresin, Brunella (16 September 2012). "È morto Roversi, intellettuale e libraio Bologna piange il suo poeta più grande". La Repubblica.
