= Canzoni (Lucio Dalla album) =

Studio album by Lucio Dalla
- Released: 1996
- Recorded: 1996
- Genre: Pop
- Label: BMG Ricordi Pressing
- Producer: Mauro Malavasi

Lucio Dalla chronology
| Henna (1993) | Canzoni (1996) | Ciao (1999) |

Canzoni is the twenty-seventh album released by Lucio Dalla. It was issued in 1996 by Pressing Records and distributed by BMG Ricordi. The release of the album was anticipated by the single "Canzone", written by Dalla with Samuele Bersani. The album reached the 1st place in the Italian charts with over 1,300,000 copies sold.

== Track listing ==
1. Ayrton – 4:26 (Paolo Montevecchi)
2. Canzone – 4:29 (Samuele Bersani, Lucio Dalla)
3. Tu non mi basti mai – 4:30 (Lucio Dalla, Tullio Ferro)
4. Domani – 5:04 (Lucio Dalla, Laurex)
5. Ballando ballando – 4:17 (Lucio Dalla, Mauro Malavasi, Robert Sidoli, Angelo Messini)
6. Sul mondo – 4:53 (Gian Luigi Fortuzzi, Leo Z)
7. Amici – 4:51 (Lucio Dalla, Gianfranco Reverberi, Sergio Bardotti)
8. Prendimi così – 4:13 (Lucio Dalla, Gabriel Zagni)
9. Nun parlà – 3:52 (Lucio Dalla)
10. Cosa vuol dire una lacrima – 3:45 (Lucio Dalla)
11. Goodbye – 4:30 (Lucio Dalla)
12. Disperato erotico stomp – 5:07 (Lucio Dalla) – Traccia nascosta
13. Vieni, spirito di Cristo – 2:13 – Traccia nascosta

== Personnel ==
- Lucio Dalla – keyboards, clarinet, vocals
- Mauro Malavasi – keyboards, programming, backing vocals
- Naco – percussion
- Paolo Marini – percussion
- Leo Z – keyboards
- Roberto Costa – bass
- Giovanni Pezzoli – drums
- Bruno Mariani – guitar
- Ricky Portera – guitar
- Daniele Zanini – guitar
- Luca Buconi – violin
- Luca Ronconi - violin
- Tullio Ferro – whistle
- Simone Bartolini – French horn
- Andrea Sandri, Francesco Yago Felleti, Iskra Menarini, Riccardo Majorana – backing vocals

== Charts ==
Chart performance for Canzoni
| Chart (1996–1998) | Peak position |
|---|---|
| Italy (FIMI) | 1 |
