= 1983 (Lucio Dalla album) =

Studio album by Lucio Dalla
- Released: April 1983
- Studio: Fonoprint, Bologna
- Genre: Pop; rock
- Length: 36:22
- Language: Italian
- Label: RCA Italiana
- Producer: Renzo Cremonini

Lucio Dalla chronology
Q Disc (1981)	1983 (1983)	Viaggi organizzati (1984)

1983 is the tenth studio album by Italian singer Lucio Dalla, released in April 1983 by RCA Italiana. The album was a commercial success, reaching number one on the Italian albums chart and staying there for eight consecutive weeks.

== Critical reception ==
Professional ratings
Review scores
Source	Rating
OndaRock	6/10

Claudio Fabretti of OndaRock wrote that Dalla's album disappointed many fans because it is a much less direct and interesting work than its predecessor. The melodies seem less inspiring, the lyrics are less smooth and brilliant, the harmonic solutions are more forced. Nevertheless, in his opinion, Dalla's talent is still burning under the ashes, as evidenced, for example, by the long suite of the same name or the more canonical "Noi come voi", which mixes a fast rhythm with an always caustic verse.

== Track listing ==
All tracks are written by Lucio Dalla, except where noted.

Side A

1. "1983" – 5:56
2. "Pecorella" – 5:04
3. "L'altra parte del mondo" – 6:27

Side B

1. "Camion" – 5:39
2. "Noi come voi" (music: Gaetano Curreri) – 3:59
3. "Stronzo" – 3:57
4. "Solo" – 5:20

== Personnel ==
- Lucio Dalla – vocals, horn, piano
- Gaetano Curreri – electronic keyboard, backing vocals
- Fabio Liberatori – electronic keyboard
- Marco Nanni – bass
- Ricky Portera – guitar
- Giovanni Pezzoli – drums
- Sandro Comini – trombone, percussion

== Charts ==
Chart performance for 1983
Chart (1983)	Peak position
Italian Albums (Musica e dischi)	1
