= Antonello Venditti =

Italian singer-songwriter and pianist (born 1949)

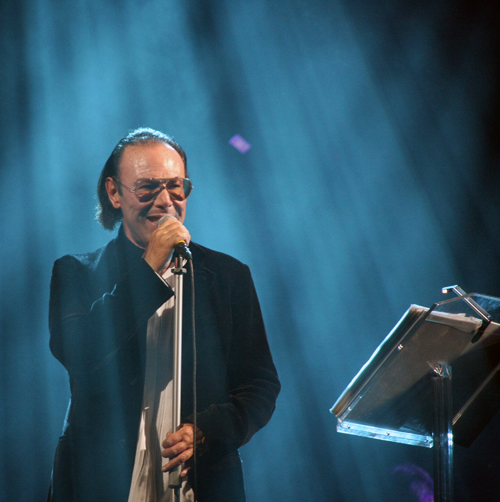
- Venditti in 2008

Background information
- Born: Antonio Venditti; 8 March 1949 (age 77); Rome, Italy
- Genre: Pop
- Occupations: Singer; songwriter; pianist
- Years active: 1971–present
- Labels: It; RCA Italiana; Philips; Heinz Music
- Website: www.antonellovenditti.it

Antonio "Antonello" Venditti (born 8 March 1949) is an Italian singer-songwriter and pianist who became popular in the 1970s for the social themes addressed in his songs.

== Biography ==
Antonello Venditti was born in Rome, the son of Vincenzino Italo Venditti from Campolieto, in Molise, who at the time was deputy-prefect in Rome, and Wanda Sicardi.

He studied piano in his youth and made his debut in the music world in the early 1970s at the Folkstudio in Rome, together with singers like Francesco De Gregori, Mimmo Locasciulli, Grazia Di Michele and Giorgio Lo Cascio. De Gregori and Venditti formed a duo and together they released their first album, Theorius Campus, in 1972. The LP enjoyed limited commercial success, but showcased Venditti's powerful voice and talent for addressing social issues. This is particularly evident in pieces like "Sora Rosa", sung in Roman dialect. Also in semi-dialect was "Roma Capoccia", a vernacular translation of the Latin expression "Roma Caput mundi" intended as a declaration of love for Venditti's hometown, which later became one of his most famous songs. Curiously, Venditti refused to sing it for several years, as he considered it not politically or socially "engaged" enough.

Venditti and De Gregori subsequently parted ways. Venditti moved to Milan in 1973 and released his first solo album L'orso bruno, made in collaboration with musician and composer Vince Tempera; this album included another song in dialect, "E li ponti so' soli", but otherwise was marked by an even stronger attention to social themes. His next work, Le cose della vita ("Things of Our Life"), released the same year for RCA Music, confirmed this tendency. The following LP Quando verrà Natale ("When Christmas Comes") was similar; its minimal arrangements emphasize the strength of Venditti's denunciation.

After a live performance of the song "A Cristo" ("To Christ"), Venditti was denounced by an Italian police officer for blasphemy. He was later acquitted. Although Venditti's use of religious language was not typical of the left-wing culture he adhered to, his lifestyle in the late 1960s and the 1970s was, as he later told the journalist Giampaolo Mattei, "secular": "They were years in which the influence of the left was really strong and the life of young people then was somewhat Godless. I think it was the everyday life of the time that led me to participate in and embrace certain things. I emerged from that when I realised it was a dead end because it took away people's joy. Maybe it did give them social growth, but it had nothing to say about happiness. Too much materialism and too little spirituality. A whole generation grew up with that materialism, supported by political slogans."

Venditti's fortunes grew and peaked in 1975, with the LP Lilly. The yearning title-track was another strong accusation, this time against drugs, and achieved an outstanding success. Other popular pieces in the album were "Compagno di scuola" ("Schoolmate") and the long ballad "Lo stambecco ferito" ("The Wounded Ibex"), the story of a corrupt Northern Italian tycoon. Venditti continued to deal with front-page matters in his next LP, Ullàlla (1976), whose "Canzone per Seveso" was about the industrial accident in July that year.

Political involvement, however, had side-effects on Venditti's inspiration in the late 1970s, marked in Italy by the growing menace of terrorism and by the strategia della tensione: some events (like the public booing of his friend De Gregori by politicized fans during a show) forced him to rethink his way of being a public personality. Sotto il segno dei pesci ("(Born) Under Pisces", 1978) contained more personal and intimate themes. The eponymous track scored a great success, but was largely misinterpreted as a love song: it actually referred to Venditti's career, as he was in fact born "under the Pisces sign".

Success was, however, marred by his divorce from his wife Simona Izzo. She won custody of Venditti's son, Francesco Venditti. The following LP, Buona domenica (1979), was strongly marked by this difficult period. It contained, however, several classics, like the title-track and the ballad Modena, which featured Gato Barbieri on saxophone and is considered one of Venditti's finest works.

In 1982 the bitter Sotto la pioggia marked Venditti's passage to his own label, Heinz Music, and the beginning of the long-lasting collaboration with producer Alessandro Colombini. The following year A.S. Roma, his city's football team, won its long-awaited second scudetto: Venditti was therefore called upon to take part in the official celebration show, and the song that he composed for the occasion, "Grazie Roma" ("Thank You Roma"), turned into a great success, surprisingly not just in Rome. Venditti had already composed several songs about his favourite football team; some people criticized them harshly, mostly because of the strong contrast with the political-social themes of his other songs.

In the following years, and notably in the 1990s, Venditti's inspiration seemed to become more mainstream and commercial and use of covers for his main hits widespread. His LPs (Cuore, In questo mondo di ladri, Benvenuti in Paradiso, Prendilo tu questo frutto amaro) were very successful, but his former themes were absent, or generally less stressed. Pieces like "Notte prima degli esami" or "Ma che bella giornata di sole" (about the liberation of Italy, in April 1945, from the fascist regime and of the occupation by Nazi Germany during World War II) were anyway praised by critics. Among the songs of this period, "Dolce Enrico", from the LP Benvenuti in Paradiso (1991), was dedicated to the former leader of the Partito Comunista Italiano, Enrico Berlinguer, who died in 1984.

Antonello nel Paese delle Meraviglie ("Antonello in Wonderland") of 1997 featured his greatest hits accompanied by the Bulgarian Symphony Orchestra of Sofia, conducted by Renato Serio. Goodbye Novecento (1999) gave increasing attention to social and historical themes, but had a sub-par success by Venditti's standards. In 2001 A.S. Roma again won a scudetto, and Venditti played again in a free concert in the Circo Massimo for an immense audience of tifosi and lovers of his songs. His latest studio release is Che fantastica storia è la vita ("What a Fantastic Story Life Is", October 2003). Gato Barbieri played with Venditti in this release. After resolving the difficulties in his friendship with Venditti, told in the latter's 1979 song "Scusa Francesco" ("Sorry Francesco"), De Gregori is also present as singer in "Io e mio fratello" ("Me and My Brother"). The album also contains a satire of Italian Prime Minister, Silvio Berlusconi ("Il Sosia").

In April 2008, in an interview with a Catholic website, Venditti spoke of his faith in Christ, his devotion to Padre Pio and his respect for Pope Benedict XVI, and also mentioned having been assaulted when he was sixteen by a malevolent entity which he identified with Satan. This led the media to class Venditti with other high-profile show-business converts like Claudia Koll (who was also attacked by a malevolent entity) and Giovanni Lindo Ferretti, although actually his conversion long predates theirs.

In October 2009 Venditti was criticized for asking, during a concert in Sicily, "Why did God create Calabria?" and declaring that "there is really nothing" in Calabria, a region in South Italy. In the past it was colonized by the ancient Greeks and became the cradle of Magna Graecia, but now it is also the base of the modern crime organization 'ndrangheta. Venditti later made peace with Calabria over a cup of good coffee at his house in Rome with the mayor of Reggio Calabria, Giuseppe Scopelliti.

In November 2011, Venditti released his new album, named Unica. The following tour started in March 2012 in Rome and ended in September 2013 in Turin. The special track "Io l'orchestra le donne e l'amore" was performed at the Arena of Verona.

In January 2014, Venditti started his small sold-out tour 'Ritorno al Futuro', which consists of the songs from the 1970s and 1980s, such as "Lo stambecco ferito", "Marta", "Compagno di scuola", "Campo de' Fiori" and others.

Venditti's latest album is Tortuga, released in 2015. The opening concert of the following tour had been held at Stadio Olimpico in Rome.

To mark the 40th anniversary of one of his most popular albums, Venditti released a remastered version of the album and started a large tour throughout Italy. The tour started at the Arena of Verona, and played five times at a sold-out Palalottomatica in Rome. The final concert in London had initially been postponed due to Covid-19 restrictions and was eventually cancelled.

In 2022 Venditti re-united with Francesco De Gregori for a national tour to celebrate the 50th anniversary of their friendship and artistic association.

After solely having toured for the last decade, a single Di' una parola had been released in 2024. The rewritten song by Venditti was inspired on Say Something by Christina Aguilera.

== Soundtracks ==
Venditti released the soundtrack for the 1985 movie Troppo Forte by his friend, the Roman director Carlo Verdone. Verdone also occasionally played drums in Venditti's concerts. Furthermore, he appears in the Academy Award winner for Best Foreign Language Film, The Great Beauty, whose soundtrack includes a song of his.

== Discography ==
- Theorius Campus (1972) (With Francesco De Gregori under the collective byname of Theorius Campus)
- L'orso bruno (1973)
- Le cose della vita (1973)
- Quando verrà Natale (1974)
- Lilly (1975)
- Ullàlla (1976)
- Cronach (1977)
- Sotto il segno dei pesci (1978)
- Buona domenica (1979)
- Sotto la pioggia (1982)
- Circo Massimo (1983, live)
- Cuore (1984)
- Centocittà (1985, live)
- Venditti e Segreti (1986)
- In questo mondo di ladri (1988)
- Gli anni ’80 (1990, collection)
- Diario (1991)
- Benvenuti in Paradiso (1991)
- Gli anni '70 (1992)
- Da San Siro a Samarcanda – L’amore insegna agli uomini (1992, live)
- Prendilo tu questo frutto amaro (1995)
- Antonello nel Paese delle Meraviglie (1997, live)
- Goodbye Novecento (1999)
- Se l'amore è amore... (2000, collection)
- Circo Massimo 2001 (2001, live)
- Il coraggio e l’amore (2002, collection)
- Che fantastica storia è la vita (2003)
- Campus Live (2005, live)
- Diamanti (2006, collection)
- Dalla pelle al cuore (2007)
- Le donne (2009)
- Unica (2011)
- TuttoVenditti (2012, collection)
- io, l'orchestra, le donne e l'amore (2013, live)
- 70. 80. Ritorno al Futuro (2014, live)
- Tortuga (2015)
- Tortuga un giorno in paridiso (2015, live)
- Sotto il segno dei pesci The anniversary tour (2019, live)
