= Ullàlla =

Studio album by Antonello Venditti
- Released: October 1976
- Genre: Italian singer-songwriters
- Label: RCA Italia
- Producer: Antonello Venditti

Antonello Venditti chronology
Lilly (1975)	Ullàlla (1976)	Sotto il segno dei pesci (1978)

Ullàlla is a music album by Italian singer-songwriter Antonello Venditti. It was released in 1976.

== Track listing ==
1. "Maria Maddalena" - 4:54
2. "Nostra Signora di Lourdes (Compromessi sposi)" - 2:45
3. "Canzone per Seveso" - 5:23
4. "Una stupida e lurida storia d'amore" - 3:42
5. "Jodi e la scimmietta" - 6:31
6. "Strada" - 4:32

== Charts ==
Chart (1976-7)	Highest position
Italy (Musica e dischi)	4
