= Buona domenica =

Studio album by Antonello Venditti
- Released: 1979
- Recorded: 1978–1979
- Studios: Trafalgar Recordings, Smoke Tree Studios, Mammouth Studios
- Label: Philips
- Producer: Michaelangelo Romano

Buona domenica is a music album by the Italian singer-songwriter Antonello Venditti, released in 1979.

== Track list ==
- All songs written by Antonello Venditti.
1. "Buona domenica" (5:39)
2. "Stai con me" (4:37)
3. "Robin" (4:38)
4. "Scusa, devo andare via (un'altra canzone)" (3:59)
5. "Modena" (7:49)
6. "Mezzanotte" (3:19)
7. "Donna in bottiglia" (3:50)
8. "Kriminal" (3:14)

== Charts ==
Chart (1979–80)	Highest position
Italy (Musica e dischi)	1

== Personnel ==
- Antonello Venditti: Piano, Vocals
- Sandro Centofanti: Piano
- Maurizio Guarini: Synthesizers
- Andrea Carpi: Acoustic Guitars
- Renato Bartolini: Acoustic and Twelve-String Guitars, Mandolin
- Rodolfo Lamorgese: Acoustic Guitars, Harmonica
- Claudio Prosperini, Fabio Pignatelli, Massimo Morante: Electric Guitars
- Carlo Siliotto: Violin
- Marco Vanozzi: Electric and Double Bass
- Agostino Marangolo, Duilio Sorrenti, Marcello Vento, Walter Gonini, Walter Martino: Drums
- Gato Barbieri, Marco Valentini: Saxophone

== Production ==
- Produced by Michaelangelo Romano
- Recorded by Pino Bernardini (Mammouth Studios), Doug Parry (Smoke Three), and Gaetano Ria (Trafalgar Studios)
