= Folkstudio =

Italian musical club and record label

Folkstudio was a musical club and a record label located in Rome, Italy.

The club was founded in 1961 (65 years ago) by the American painter, musician and actor Harold Bradley Jr., and was located in Via Garibaldi, in Trastevere. In January 1963, a then little known Bob Dylan performed in the club. In 1967, Bradley returned to the United States and the club management passed to the chemist and music lover Giancarlo Cesaroni. Initially focusing on jazz and blues artists, during the years it gradually hosted artists belonging to other styles and new tendencies. In 1971, it moved from Via Garibaldi to the library L'Uscita, in Via dei Banchi Vecchi, and eventually moved to Via Sacchi, Trastevere.

During the 1970s, the club actively contributed to the launch of several artists' careers, particularly singer-songwriters, including Antonello Venditti, Francesco De Gregori, Rino Gaetano, Mimmo Locasciulli, Stefano Rosso, Gianni Togni, Sergio Caputo, Giorgio Lo Cascio, Grazia Di Michele, Mario Castelnuovo. Cesaroni also created a "Folkstudio" record label which released debut albums of artists who regularly performed in the club such as Corrado Sannucci and Locasciulli.
