= Antonello nel Paese delle Meraviglie =

Studio album by Antonello Venditti
- Released: 1997
- Label: Heinz Music

Antonello nel Paese delle Meraviglie ("Antonello in Wonderland") is a 1997 album by Antonello Venditti.

The album consists of symphonic arrangements of songs previously released by Vendetti with the exception of "Ho fatto un sogno", which was written in collaboration with Sergio Bardotti and Ennio Morricone and appears for the first time on this album.

== Track listing ==
1. Buona domenica – 4:19
2. Ci vorrebbe un amico – 3:43
3. Amici mai – 5:15
4. Sara – 3:41
5. Andare in ogni senso - 4:52
6. Settembre – 4:00
7. Benvenuti in Paradiso – 5:19
8. Ho fatto un sogno – 3:52
9. Le cose della vita – 3:07
10. L'amore insegna agli uomini – 4:18
11. In questo mondo di ladri – 4:44
12. Campo de' Fiori – 5:50
13. Ricordati di me – 4:41

== Charts ==
Chart (1997-8)	Highest position
Italy (Musica e dischi)	10
