= Mimmo Locasciulli =

Italian singer-songwriter (born 1949)

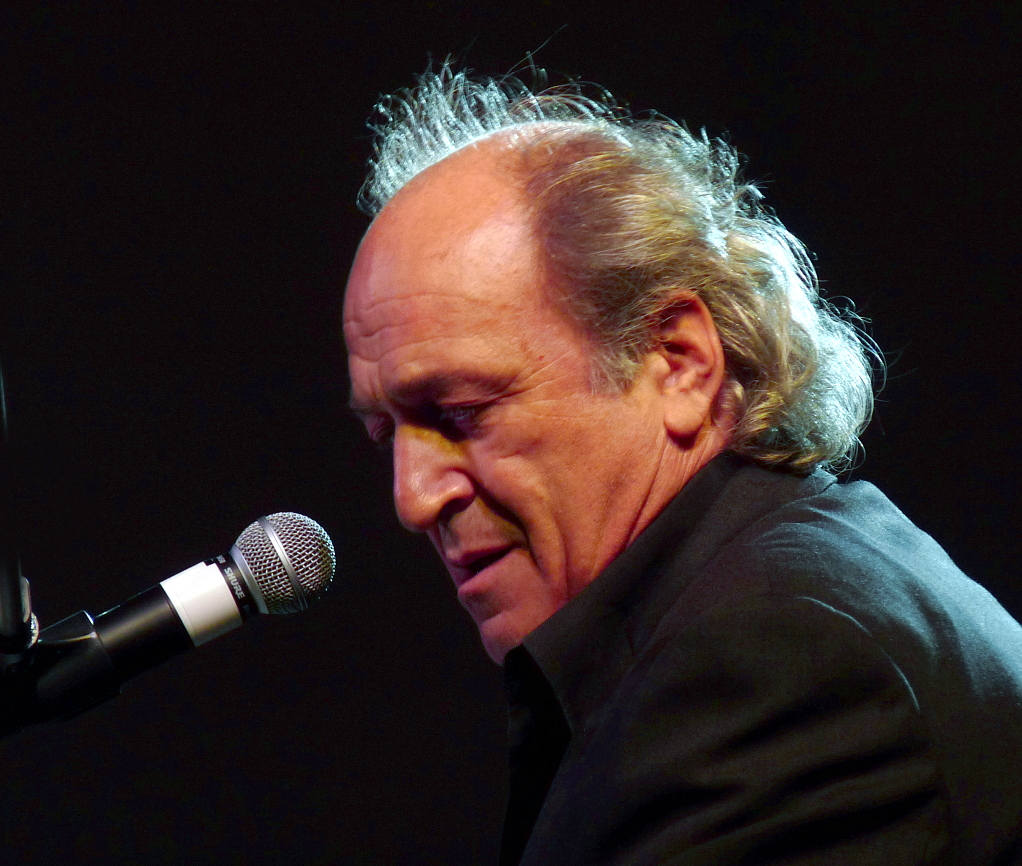
- Locasciulli in 2010
- Born: Domenico Locasciulli; 7 July 1949 (age 77); Penne, Abruzzo, Italy
- Occupation: Singer-songwriter

Mimmo Locasciulli (born 7 July 1949) is an Italian singer-songwriter, composer, producer and musician.

== Life and career ==
Born in Penne, Pescara, Locasciulli is the son of a vet who in his spare time used to perform as a crooner with the stage name Guido Lucas.

In 1965 he formed a band with whom he performed in the music halls of the Adriatic coast. In 1968 he moved to Perugia to study medicine, and there started performing in the piano bars of the city. In 1971 he relocated to the Sapienza University of Rome and after performing in a number of the city's nightclubs he eventually established himself as a regular performer in the club Folkstudio.

Locasciulli made his discographic debut in 1975, and after a couple of commercial disappointments he had his first success in 1982, with the album Intorno a trent'anni, produced by Francesco De Gregori. In 1985 he entered the competition at the Sanremo Music Festival, ranking nineteenth with the song "Buona fortuna". Between 1985 and 1987 he toured with Enrico Ruggeri, then in 1988 Locasciulli started an acclaimed collaboration with the jazz bassist Greg Cohen.

Starting from the 1990s, following the critically acclaimed album Tango dietro l'angolo, he mainly focused on his activity as a producer and on in his day job as a primary care physician.

== Discography ==
Album

- 1975 - Non rimanere là (Folkstudio, FK 5001)
- 1977 - Quello che ci resta (RCA Italiana, PL 31316)
- 1980 - Quattro canzoni di Mimmo Locasciulli (RCA Italiana, PG 33403)
- 1982 - Intorno a trent'anni (RCA Italiana, PL 31625)
- 1983 - Sognadoro (RCA Italiana, PL 31710)
- 1985 - Mimmo Locasciulli (RCA Italiana, PL 70702)
- 1985 - Confusi in un playback (RCA Italiana, PL 70942; live album)
- 1987 - Clandestina (RCA Italiana, PL 71242)
- 1989 - (Adesso glielo dico) (RCA Italiana, PL 74117)
- 1991 - Tango dietro l'angolo (Philips, 8486631)
- 1992 - Delitti perfetti (Philips, 512 372-1)
- 1995 - Uomini (Mercury, 528 152-2)
- 1998 - Il futuro (Mercury, 558 379-2)
- 2002 - Aria di famiglia (Hobo, HOB 508388-2)
- 2004 - Piano piano (Hobo, HOB 515205-2)
- 2006 - Sglobal (Hobo, HOB 1200605)
- 2009 - Idra (Hobo, 457982)
- 2016 - Piccoli cambiamenti
- 2018 - Cenere
- 2020 - 22 Canzoni
- 2022 - Intorno a trent'anni Revisited
