= Lucio Dalla =

Italian singer-songwriter (1943–2012)

Lucio Dalla OMRI
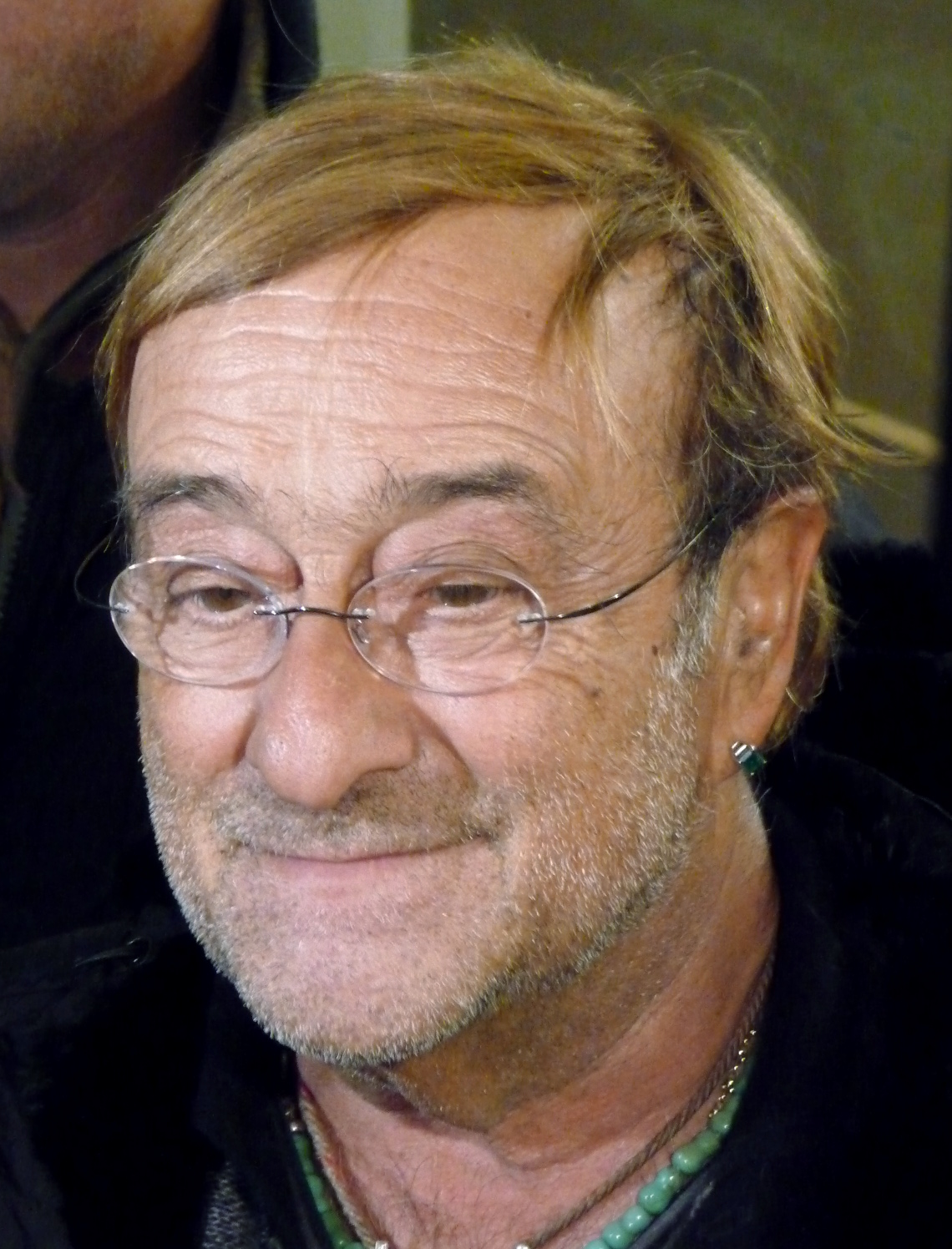
- Dalla in 2008
- Born: 4 March 1943; Bologna, Emilia-Romagna, Kingdom of Italy
- Died: 1 March 2012 (aged 68); Montreux, Vaud, Switzerland
- Resting place: Certosa di Bologna, Italy
- Occupations: Singer-songwriter; musician
- Years active: 1966–2012
- Style: Jazz; blues; opera; pop
- Website: luciodalla.it

Lucio Dalla OMRI (Italian: [ˈluːtʃo ˈdalla]; 4 March 1943 – 1 March 2012) was an Italian singer-songwriter, musician and actor. He also played clarinet and keyboards.

Dalla was the composer of "Caruso" (1986), a song dedicated to Italian opera tenor Enrico Caruso, and "L'anno che verrà" (1979).

== Career ==
=== Beginnings ===
Dalla was born in Bologna, Italy. He began to play the clarinet at an early age, in a jazz band in Bologna, and became a member of a local jazz band called Rheno Dixieland Band, together with future film director Pupi Avati. Avati said that he decided to leave the band after feeling overwhelmed by Dalla's talent. He also acknowledged that his film, Ma quando arrivano le ragazze? (2005), was inspired by his friendship with Dalla.

In the 1960s the band participated in the first Jazz Festival at Antibes, France. The Rheno Dixieland Band won the first prize in the traditional jazz band category and was noticed by a Roman band called Second Roman New Orleans Jazz Band, with whom Dalla recorded his first record in 1961 and had the first contacts with RCA records, his future music publisher.

Singer-songwriter Gino Paoli hearing Dalla's vocal qualities, suggested that he attempt a soloist career as a soul singer. However, Dalla's debut at the Cantagiro music festival in 1965 was not successful probably due to both his physical appearance as well as his music, which was considered too experimental for the time. His first single, a rendition in Italian of the American traditional standard "Careless Love" was a failure, as it was his first album, 1999, that was released the following year. His next album, Terra di Gaibola (from the name of a suburb of Bologna), was released in 1970 and contained some early Dalla classics. His first hit was "4/3/1943", which achieved some success due to the Sanremo Festival. The original title of the song was supposed to be "Gesù bambino", however in those years there was still stiff censorial control over the content of songs, and the title was changed to Dalla's birth date.

=== With Roberto Roversi ===
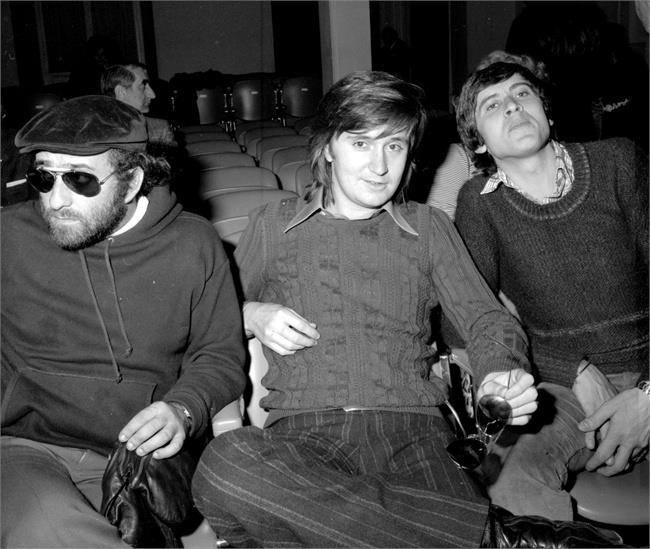
Dalla (left) with Bobby Solo and Gianni Morandi at the Sanremo Music Festival 1972

Dalla's recording debut as a soloist took place in 1964, with the release of the 45 rpm-single "Lei (non è per me)" (B-side: "Ma questa sera"). In the 1970s, Dalla started a collaboration with the Bolognese poet Roberto Roversi. Roversi wrote the lyrics to Dalla's next three albums Il giorno aveva cinque teste (The Day Had Five Heads) (1973), Anidride solforosa (Sulphur dioxide) (1975) and Automobili (Automobiles) (1976).

Although these albums did not sell in large numbers, they were noted by critics for the unusual mix of Roversi's lyrics with Dalla's improvisations, along with the latter's sometimes experimental twists and composition abilities. The duo had already broken up by the time the concept album Automobili was released. Roversi, who had been against the album's release, chose the pseudonym "Norisso" when it was time to register the songs. The album, however, included one of Dalla's most popular songs, "Nuvolari", named after the famous 1930s Italian racer.

=== Solo career ===
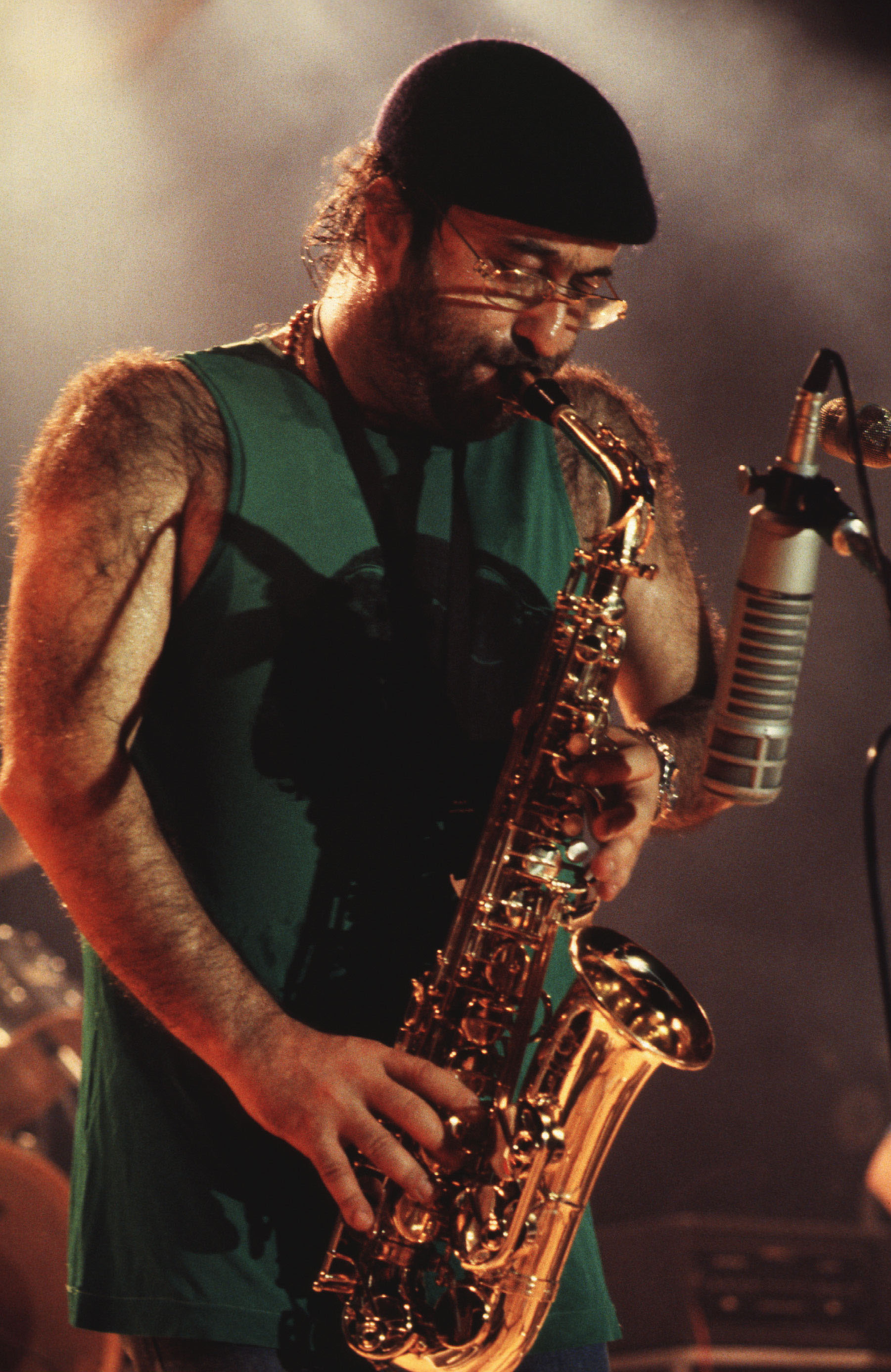
Lucio Dalla in the 1980s

Affected by the end of the collaboration, Dalla decided to write the lyrics of his next albums himself. The first album of this new phase was Com'è profondo il mare (1977), in which Dalla was accompanied by members of future pop band Stadio.

In 1979, his popularity was confirmed by the success of the Banana Republic album and the first of two self-titled albums, Lucio Dalla, followed by Dalla in 1980.

The song "Caruso", dedicated to Italian tenor Enrico Caruso and released in 1986, has been covered by numerous international artists such as Luciano Pavarotti and Julio Iglesias. The version sung by Pavarotti sold over 9 million copies, and another version was a track on Andrea Bocelli's first international album, Romanza, which sold over 20 million copies worldwide. Maynard Ferguson also covered the song on his album "Brass Attitude", after having previously paid tribute to Caruso with his rendition of "Vesti la giubba" (titled as "Pagliacci") on the album Primal Scream.

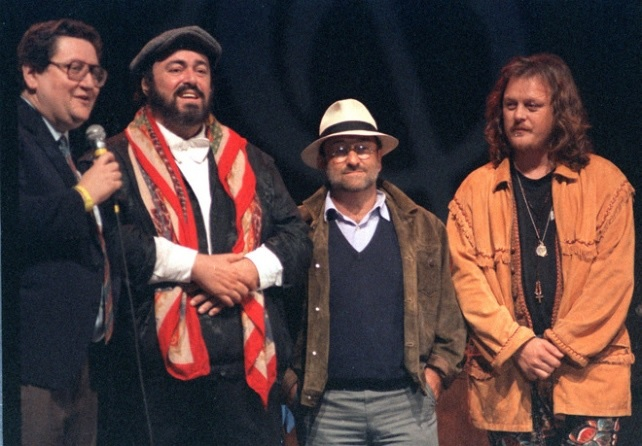
Pavarotti & Friends, 1992. Left to right: Vincenzo Mollica, Luciano Pavarotti, Lucio Dalla and Zucchero

The 1990 hit single "Attenti al lupo" gave Dalla wider success in Europe. He was invited to duet on Pavarotti & Friends, singing his hit "Caruso" with Pavarotti.

In 2010, Dalla came back to work with Francesco De Gregori during the "Work in Progress" tour and album. Dalla's main influences were to be found in jazz, but his songs ranged from folk ("Attenti al lupo") and pop ("Lunedì"), from Italian singer-songwriters (the albums from Com'è profondo il mare to Dalla) to classical and opera ("Caruso").

== Personal life and death ==
Dalla was openly leftist and also a practicing Roman Catholic.

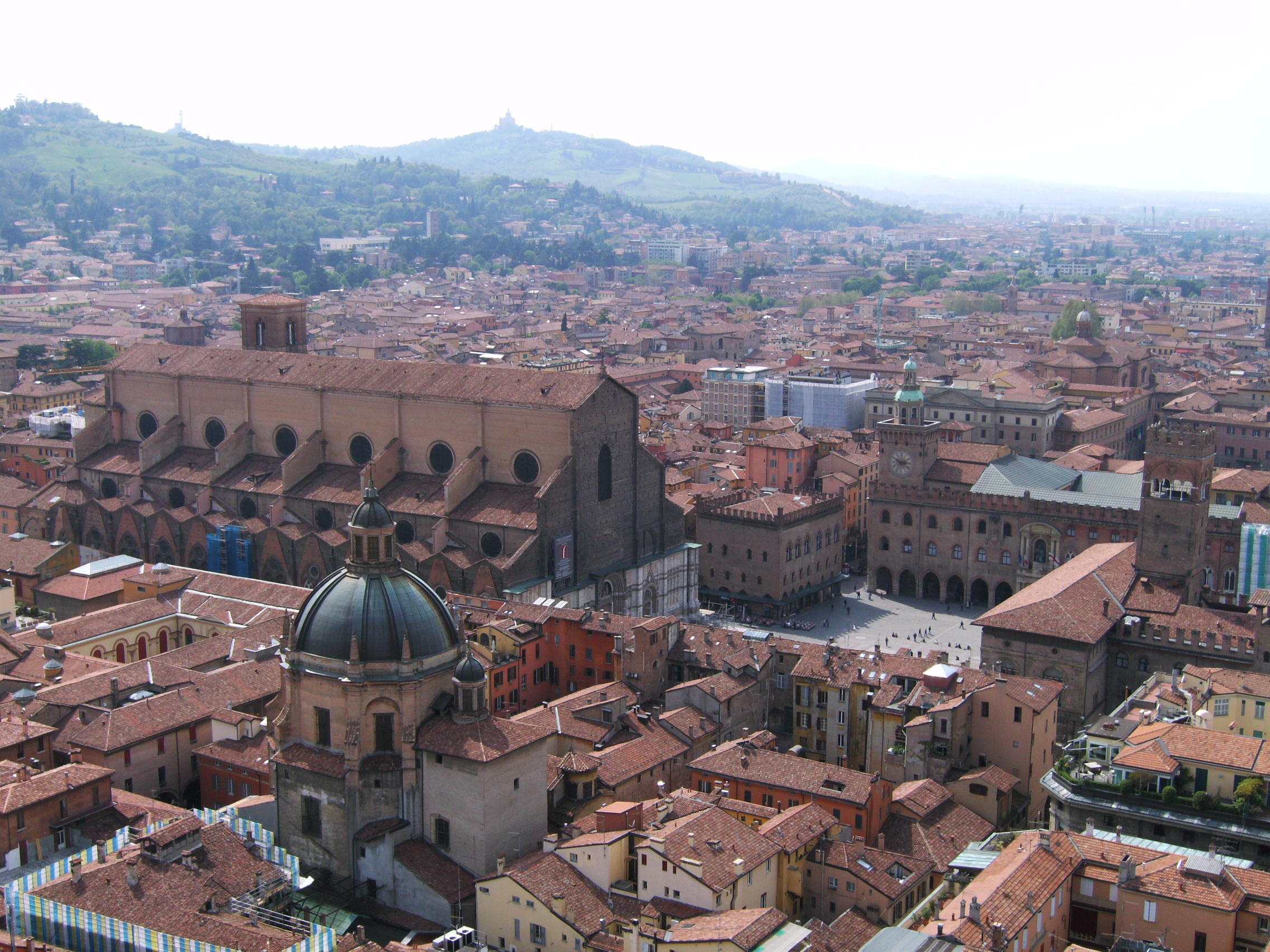
Piazza Maggiore in Bologna, where Dalla's funeral was held and attended by an estimated 50,000 people.

On the morning of 1 March 2012, three days before his 69th birthday, Dalla died of a heart attack, shortly after having breakfast at the hotel where he was staying in Montreux, Switzerland, having performed in the city the night before. He was in the company of his longterm associate and partner Marco Alemanno when he died. An estimated 50,000 people attended his funeral in his native city of Bologna. Dalla's 1986 song "Caruso" entered the Italian Singles Chart after his death, peaking at number two for two consecutive weeks. The single was also certified platinum by the Federation of the Italian Music Industry.

Dalla was outed as gay after his funeral, at which Marco Alemanno, with whom he had shared a house, spoke; he had not publicly acknowledged this during his life, saying in a 1979 interview "Non mi sento omosessuale" ("I do not feel gay"). This outing sparked debate about Italian society's attitudes towards homosexuality.

== Discography ==
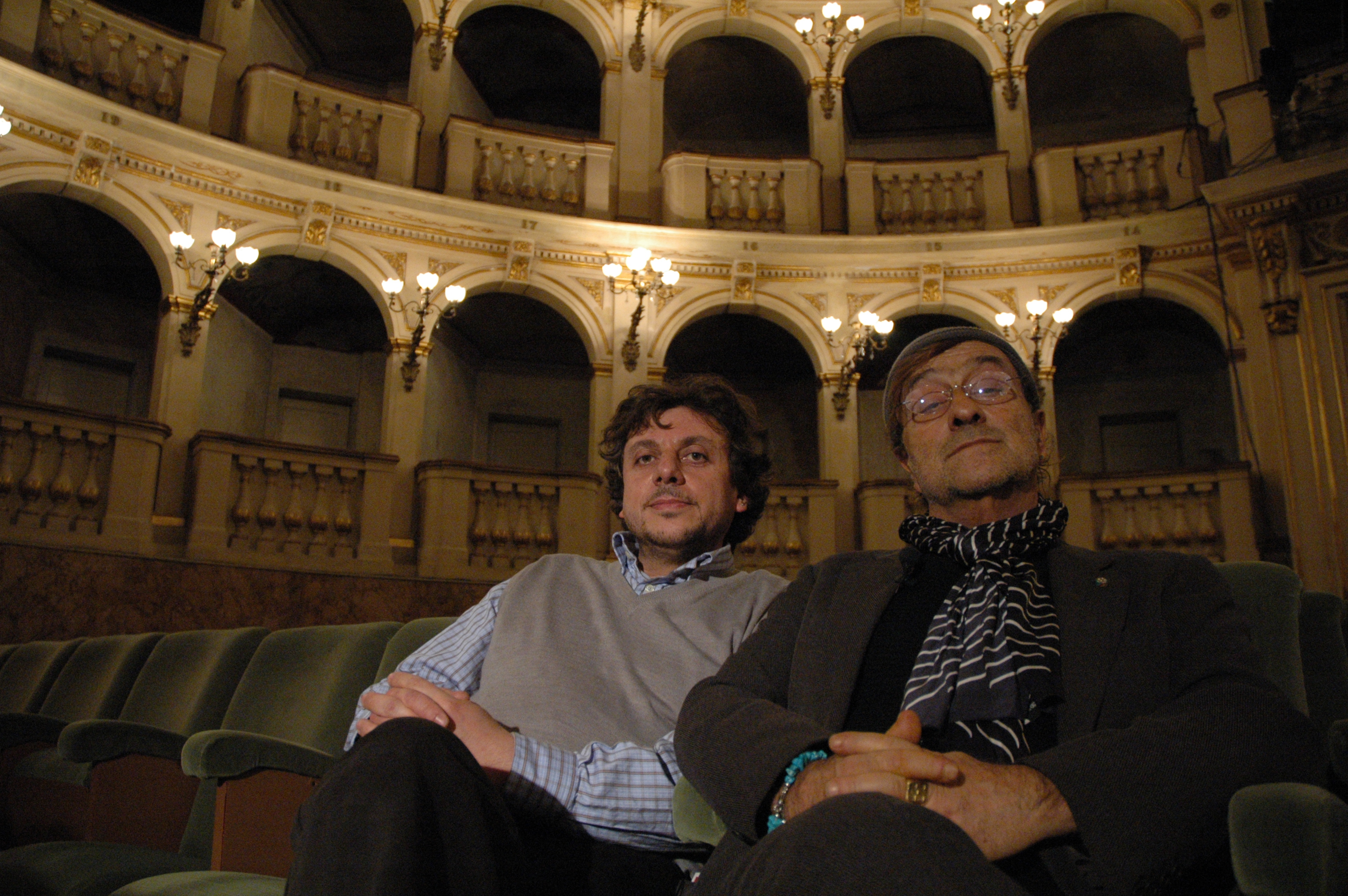
Lucio Dalla (right) sitting in the Teatro Comunale, in Bologna, next to music producer Gianluigi Salvioni.

Dalla's discography includes twenty-two studio albums for the Italian market, a Qdisc, nine live albums, various collections and several albums for the foreign market. Here is the list of Lucio Dalla albums:

- 1999 (1966)
- Terra di Gaibola (1970)
- Storie di casa mia (1970)
- Il giorno aveva cinque teste (1973)
- Anidride solforosa (1975)
- Automobili (1976)
- 4 Marzo 1943 (1976)
- Com'è profondo il mare (1977)
- Lucio Dalla (1979)
- Quel fenomeno di Lucio Dalla (1979)
- Banana Republic (1979, with Francesco De Gregori and Rosalino Cellamare)
- Dalla (1980)
- Lucio Dalla (Q Disc) (1981)
- Torino, Milano e dintorni (1981)
- Gli anni Settanta (1981)
- 1983 (1983)
- L'album di Lucio Dalla (1983)
- Viaggi organizzati (1984)
- Bugie (1985)
- The best of Lucio Dalla (1985)
- DallameriCaruso (1986)
- Dalla/Morandi (1988)
- Cambio (1990)
- Il motore del 2000 (1990)
- Il primo Lucio Dalla (1990)
- Amen (1992)
- Henna (1993)
- Maria Farantouri sings Lucio Dalla (1995)
- Le origini (1996)
- Canzoni (1996)
- Ciao (1999)
- Luna Matana (2001)
- Live@RTSI – 20 dicembre 1978 (2001)
- Dal vivo – Bologna 2 settembre 1974 (2001)
- Caro amico ti scrivo... (Best of) (2002)
- Tosca. Amore disperato (2003)
- Lucio (2003)
- 12000 Lune (Best of/Box Set) (2006)
- Il contrario di me (2007)
- Angoli nel cielo (2010)
- Questo è amore (2011)

== Filmography ==
Dalla featured as an actor in seventeen films and was musical director for seventeen others. This is a list of DVDs of music concerts.

- Live@RTSI – 20 dicembre 1978 (2001)
- Retrospettiva (2003)
- In concerto (2004)
- Banana Republic (2006)
- Tu Non Basti Mai (2009)

== Honors ==
- Commander of the Order of Merit of the Italian Republic, "On a proposal from the Presidency of the Council of Ministers" – 27 December 1986
- Grand Officer of the Order of Merit of the Italian Republic, "By the initiative of the President of the Republic" – 3 November 2003
- Degree honoris causa in Disciplines of the Arts, Music and Entertainment at the Faculty of Letters and philosophy, the Alma Mater Studiorum – University of Bologna.
