= Francesco De Gregori =

Italian singer-songwriter (born 1951)

Francesco De Gregori OMRI
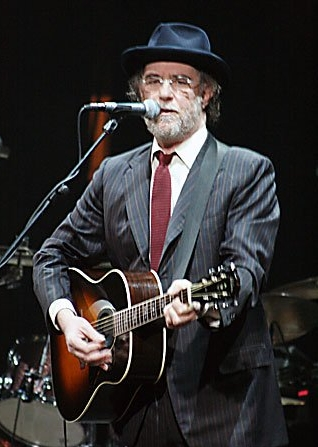
- De Gregori in concert in 2008

Background information
- Born: 4 April 1951 (age 75); Rome, Italy
- Genre: Folk rock
- Occupation: Singer-songwriter
- Instruments: Vocals, guitar, piano, harmonica
- Years active: 1972–present
- Labels: RCA Italy, CBS
- Website: www.francescodegregori.net

Francesco De Gregori (born 4 April 1951) is an Italian singer-songwriter. In Italy, he is popularly known as "Il Principe dei cantautori" ("The Prince of the singer-songwriters"), a nickname referring to the elegance of his lyrics. Although often referred as singer-songwriter and poet, he prefers to be identified simply as "artist".

== Biography ==
=== 1970s ===
De Gregori was born in Rome to a middle-class family, to Giorgio and Rita Grechi, and he spent some of his youth in Pescara before returning to the capital. His elder brother, Luigi, was a musician and had a personal career with the name of Luigi Grechi (the mother's surname), chosen later to avoid confusion with the more famous Francesco.

Influenced by Bob Dylan, Leonard Cohen and the Italian singer-songwriter Fabrizio de André, De Gregori started to perform his songs (mainly personal translations of American folk songs) at the Folkstudio, in Rome, which was already frequented by his brother. On one occasion De André himself is said to have listened to De Gregori's work and appreciated it.

Later De Gregori formed a band with his friends Antonello Venditti, Mimmo Locasciulli and Giorgio Lo Cascio, who all had success as singer-songwriters in the following years. De Gregori made his debut as a professional singer in 1972 with Theorius Campus, in collaboration with Venditti. The LP included the early masterpiece "Signora Aquilone" ("Kite Lady"), but Venditti had more songs and, having a better voice, earned better consideration by the label. The duo subsequently broke up.

De Gregori's next album, Alice non lo sa (1973), was a commercial failure. However, the title-track, the mysterious "Alice", scored some success in several popular music shows and is still included amongst his best works today. The 1974 album Francesco De Gregori (also known as the "Sheep" due to the unusual cover by Gordon Fagetter) showed even more experimental and sometimes obscure lyrics, and again was a failure. RCA Music, however, continued to trust in De Gregori's qualities: this trust was repaid the following year, when De Gregori released one of the most successful Italian LPs of the 1970s, Rimmel. This work contained several of his most famous songs: this time De Gregori's talent for unusual and poetic lyrics intermingled in a more mature way with the music. Lucio Dalla provided musical ideas for "Pablo", the unusual story of a Spanish immigrant in Switzerland. Jazzy themes were present in songs like "Quattro cani" ("Four Dogs") and "Le storie di ieri" ("The Stories of Yesterday"). The latter, a song about the years of Fascism, had been already released on De André's 1974 album Volume 8, as it had been written during a stay in the Genoese singer's Sardinian estate.

Bufalo Bill (1976) confirmed De Gregori's qualities, and contained at least two classics: the eponymous song and "Santa Lucia", the singer's own favourite. However, during a concert held in Milan in 1976, De Gregori, who had always declared his inclination to left-wing ideas and ideals, was fiercely contested by a group of extreme left agitators. In a mock "trial", they accused him of using a left-wing message solely to sell records and insisted that music should be free. De Gregori was at risk of injury in the fray, and decided to quit his musical career. During the following two years he therefore worked as a bookstore and music shop clerk. The episode, known as the "Palalido incident", influenced several works by other Italian singer-songwriters, such as Roberto Vecchioni's "Vaudeville". The "Palalido incident" was one of a number of such incidents. At this time, De Gregori married Alessandra Gobbi whom he had known since High School, and they had two sons, Marco and Federico.

In 1978, however, he returned with another inspired album, De Gregori, containing one of his most famous songs, "Generale". He declared that he felt this song much too important for him to continue staying away from the music world. The following year he joined his old friend Lucio Dalla with a highly successful live tour, entitled Banana Republic, and published a studio LP, Viva l'Italia featuring American musicians. The title track was later adopted as the Italian Socialist Party song, but De Gregori always opposed this choice.

=== 1980s ===
After a pause of several years, De Gregori returned with the album Titanic, the first part of which was like a concept album devoted to the famous episode of the sinking of the eponymous liner. The ballad "San Lorenzo", with a rare piano performance by De Gregori, concerns the dramatic episode of the bombing during World War II of the quarter in Rome by Allied planes. The freshness of the music and lyrics made this an outstanding commercial success, as well as earning the praise of critics. Titanic has been recently declared the best Italian LP of the period 1975–2005, in a poll conducted for the authoritative Italian newspaper Il Corriere della Sera.

The following year de Gregori released a mini-LP containing his most long-standing success, La Donna Cannone, a song that De Gregori asked initially Mia Martini to sing. The 1985 album Scacchi e tarocchi ("Chess and Tarots"), was not as successful, but contained another classic, "La Storia" ("History"). De Gregori's new melancholic inspiration was confirmed by the subsequent Terra di nessuno ("No man's Land"). On the other hand, Miramare 19-4-89 showed a more bitter mood, but again was not as successful as his albums of the 1970s and early 1980s.

=== 1990s and 2000s ===
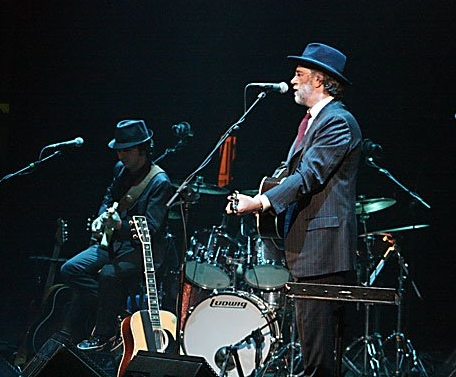
De Gregori in concert, March 2008

De Gregori recovered his bestseller status in 1992 with Canzoni d'amore ("Love Songs"). In the 1990s he released fewer studio albums than collections and live albums. His next original work was Prendere e lasciare ("Take and Leave", 1996): from this point his song and his musical performance were marked by an increasing Bob Dylan influence.

Il bandito e il campione of 1993 was a live collection that had remarkable success: the title track, its only studio song, was sung by De Gregori but the lyrics were by his brother Luigi Grechi. The title track of La valigia dell'attore ("The Actor's Suitcase", 1998) showed De Gregori at the best of his poetical and emotional capabilities again. The rest of the album, however, contained old pieces, plus some Dylan covers.

In 2001 De Gregori released his next studio album, Amore nel pomeriggio ("Love in the Afternoon") which is unanimously included amongst his best works. The song "Il cuoco di Salò" ("The Cook of Salò"), arranged by Franco Battiato, is one of De Gregori's best and shows his typical attention to "everyday" figures (including outcasts and underdogs) and lives while dealing with historical themes.

Il fischio del vapore ("The Whistle of the Steam", 2002) was a collaboration with the folksinger Giovanna Marini, who had already worked with De Gregori in a song for Titanic. The album is a collection of old popular and social Italian songs from the 19th and the early 20th centuries.

A biography of Francesco De Gregori, "Quello che non so, lo so cantare" ("What I Don't Know, I Know How to Sing"), edited by Enrico Deregibus, was published by Giunti in 2003. In 2005, De Gregori won the Targa Tenco for the best Italian album of the year with Pezzi, an album with strong rock elements. In February 2006, only eleven months after the release of Pezzi, De Gregori released a new studio album, Calypsos, with nine previously unreleased tracks. Amongst these was "Cardiologia" ("Cardiology"), a song where the Roman singer-songwriter returns to using the words "Ti amo" ("I love you"), more than thirty years after "Pezzi di Vetro", and the song "Per le strade di Roma" ("By the Streets of Rome"), which outlines a merciless picture of the Rome of the third millennium, archetypical of the Italy of today.

In November 2006 a triple CD Tra un manifesto e lo specchio that collected together his most representative tracks was released. As well as the celebrated track "Diamante" ("Diamond"), this contained pieces written for Zucchero and included on his album Oro incenso e birra ("Gold, Incense and Beer"), a demo of "Mannaggia alla musica" ("Damn to the Music") from 1979, originally written for Ron and previously presented on the live album Bootleg, and the B-side of the single "Viva l'Italia" ("Long Live Italy"), the celebrated "Banana Republic", sung without Lucio Dalla.

=== 2010s ===
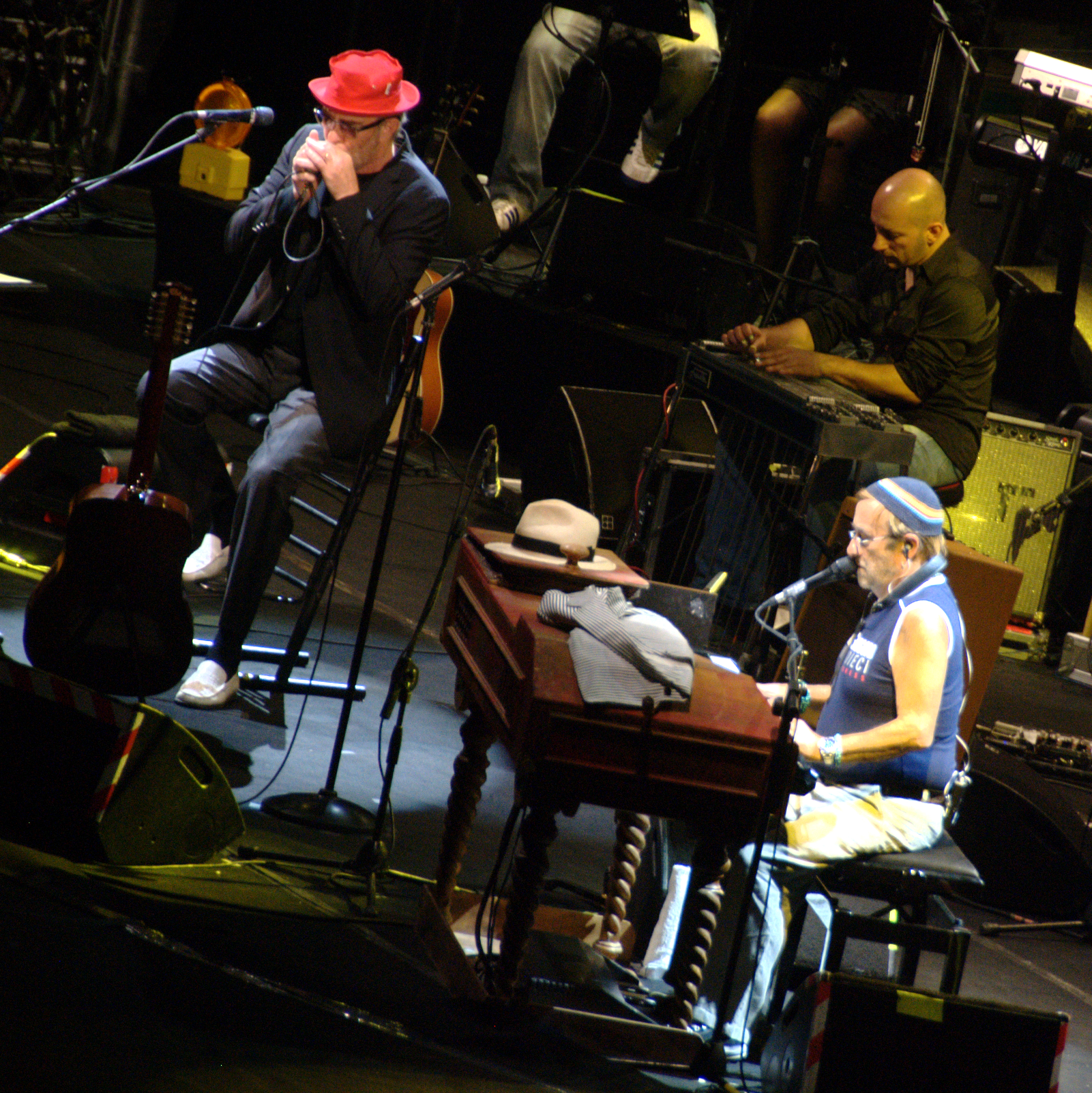
Dalla-De Gregori in 2010

2010 opens with the news (given on 2 January) of a new set of concerts with De Gregori and Lucio Dalla, over thirty years since the splendor of Banana Republic, at the Vox Club Nonantola, with the name "Work in progress".

The concert, which becomes sold out in advance, opens another series of concerts that are announced on the occasion of the date of Nonantola, and that will be held in May in Milan and Rome; during the evening the two presented, in addition to known songs, a new song called "Non basta saper cantare" and announce also the release of their new album called "Work in Progress".

On 22 March 2010, Dalla and De Gregori lead the new TV show on Rai 2, entitled Due, during which they perform individually and in duets, covers and songs from their repertoires. On 1 May 2011 the duo played at the May Day Concert in Rome.

== Discography ==
- Theorius Campus (1972, with Antonello Venditti)
- Alice non lo sa (1973)
- Francesco De Gregori (1974)
- Rimmel (1975)
- Bufalo Bill (1976)
- De Gregori (1978)
- Banana Republic (1979, with Lucio Dalla, live)
- Viva l'Italia (1979)
- Titanic (1982)
- La donna cannone (1983, Qdisc)
- Scacchi e tarocchi (1985)
- Terra di nessuno (1987)
- Miramare 19-4-89 (1989)
- Catcher in the Sky (1990, live)
- Niente da capire (1990, live)
- Musica leggera (1990, live)
- Canzoni d'amore (1992)
- Il bandito e il campione (1993, live)
- Bootleg (1994, live)
- Prendere e lasciare (1996)
- La valigia dell'attore (1997, live)
- Curve nella memoria (1998, collection)
- Amore nel pomeriggio (2001)
- Fuoco amico (2001, live)
- Il fischio del vapore (2002, with Giovanna Marini)
- Mix (2003, collection)
- Pezzi (2005)
- Calypsos (2006)
- Left & Right - Documenti dal vivo (2007, live)
- Per Brevità Chiamato Artista (2008)
- Work in Progress (2010, live, with Lucio Dalla)
- Pubs & Clubs - Live@The Place (2012, live)
- Sulla strada (2012)
- Oggi (2013, collection)
- Sulla strada - limited edition (2013)
- Vivavoce (2014)
- De Gregori canta Bob Dylan – Amore e furto (2015)

== Awards and nominations ==
Year	Award	Nomination	Work	Result
1988	Targa Tenco	Best Album	Terra di nessuno	Won
1989	Targa Tenco	Best Album	Mira Mare 19.4.89	Won
1998	Targa Tenco	Best Song	"La valigia dell'attore"	Won
1999	Targa Tenco	Best Singer (with Giovanna Marini)	Il fischio del vapore	Won
2005	Targa Tenco	Best Album	Pezzi	Won
2013	Wind Music Awards	Album Award (for 30.000 copies sold)	Sulla Strada	Won
2013	Targa Tenco	Album of the Year	Sulla Strada	Pending
