= Francesco Gabbani discography =

Discography of Italian singer-songwriter and multi-instrumentalist Francesco Gabbani

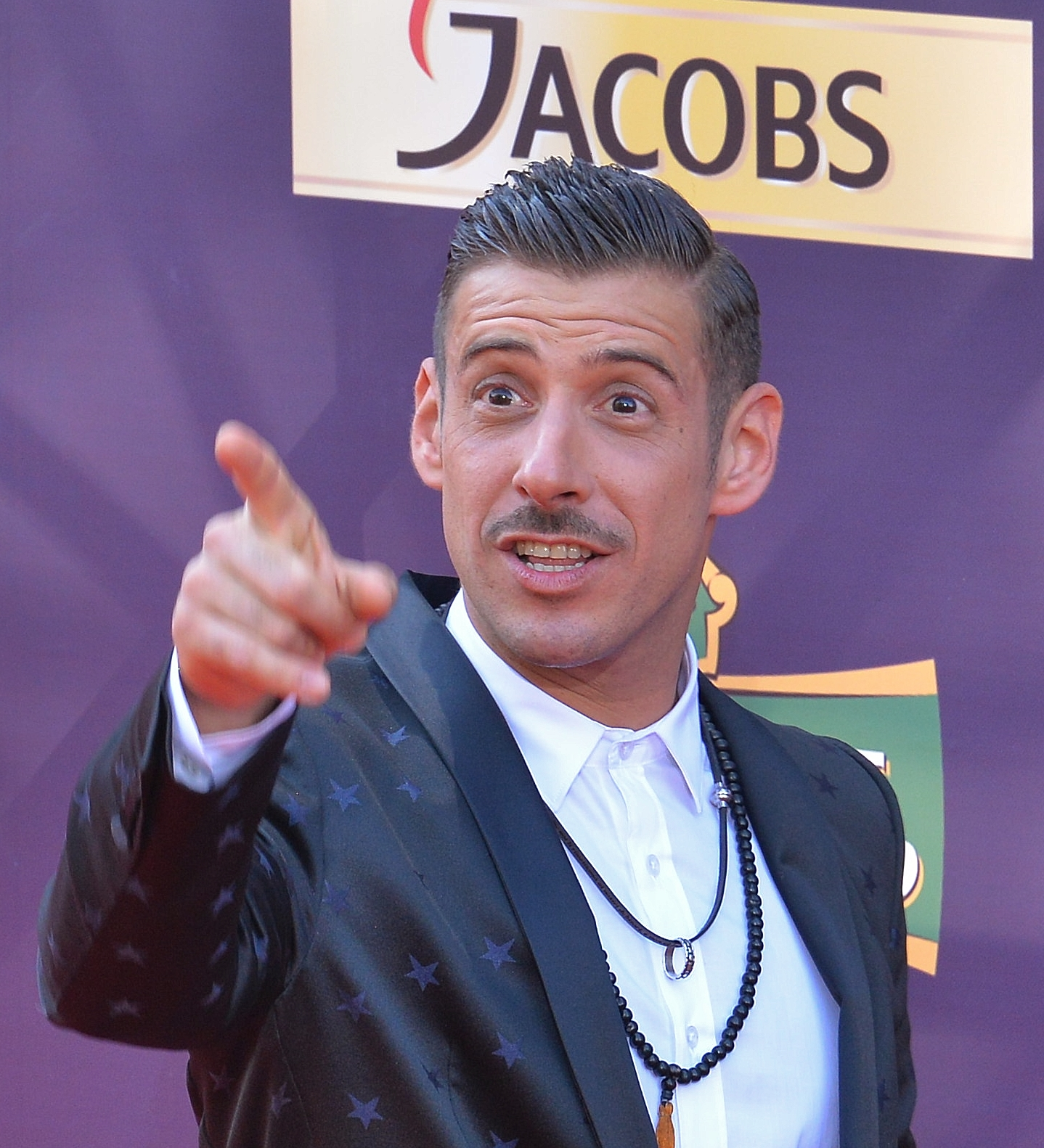
- Gabbani in 2017
- Studio albums: 6
- Soundtrack albums: 1
- Live albums: 1
- Singles: 27
- Music videos: 10+

This is the discography of Italian singer-songwriter and multi-instrumentalist Francesco Gabbani. His debut studio album, Greitist Iz, was released in May 2014. It peaked at number 59 on the Italian Albums Chart. The album includes the singles "I dischi non si suonano" and "Clandestino". His second studio album, Eternamente ora, was released in February 2016. It peaked at number 18 on the Italian Albums Chart. "Amen" was released as the lead single from the album on 27 November 2015. The song peaked at number 14 on the Italian Singles Chart. The song took part in Sanremo Music Festival 2016 he won the final of the Newcomers' section. "Eternamente ora" was released as the second single from the album on 6 May 2016. "In equilibrio" was released as the third single from the album on 12 September 2016. His third studio album, Magellano, was released in April 2017. It peaked at number 1 on the Italian Albums Chart. "Occidentali's Karma" was released as the lead single from the album on 10 February 2017. The song peaked at number 1 on the Italian Singles Chart. In February 2017, Gabbani won Sanremo Music Festival 2017 and accepted the invitation to represent Italy in the Eurovision Song Contest, which took place at the International Exhibition Centre in Kyiv, Ukraine. As a member of the "Big 5", Italy automatically qualified to compete in the final, which was held on 13 May 2017.

== Albums ==
=== Studio albums ===
List of studio albums, with selected chart positions, sales figures and certifications
Title	Details	Peak chart positions			Certifications
Title	Details	ITA	BEL (Wa)	SWI	Certifications
Greitist Iz	Released: 27 May 2014; Label: DIY Italia; Formats: CD, digital download	59	—	—	
Eternamente ora	Released: 12 February 2016; Label: BMG; Formats: CD, LP, digital download	18	—	—	
Magellano	Released: 28 April 2017; Label: BMG; Formats: CD, LP, digital download, streaming	1	174	35	FIMI: Platinum
Viceversa	Released: 14 February 2020; Label: BMG; Formats: CD, LP, digital download, streaming	2	—	97	FIMI: Gold
Volevamo solo essere felici	Released: 22 April 2022; Label: BMG; Formats: CD, LP, digital download, streaming	4	—	—	FIMI: Gold
Dalla tua parte	Released: 21 February 2025; Label: BMG; Formats: CD, LP, digital download, streaming	2	—	—	
"—" denotes an album that did not chart or was not released.

=== Live albums ===
List of live albums
Title	Details
Sudore, fiato, cuore – Live 2017	Released 15 December 2017; Label: BMG; Formats: LP

=== Soundtrack albums ===
List of soundtrack albums
Title	Details
Poveri ma ricchi (Original Soundtrack)	Released 16 December 2016; Label: BMG; Formats: CD

== Singles ==
=== As lead artist ===
List of singles as lead artist, with selected chart positions and certifications, showing year released and album name
Title	Year	Peak chart positions						Certifications	Album
Title	Year	ITA	AUT	FRA	SPA	SWE	SWI	Certifications	Album
"Italia 21"	2011	—	—	—	—	—	—		Non-album single
"I dischi non si suonano"	2014	—	—	—	—	—	—		Greitist Iz
"Amen" (Note: "Amen" also features on his third studio album Magellano.)	2016	14	—	—	—	—	—	FIMI: Platinum	Eternamente ora
"Eternamente ora"	2016	—	—	—	—	—	—		Eternamente ora
"In equilibrio"	2016	—	—	—	—	—	—		Eternamente ora
"Foglie al gelo" (Note: "Foglie al gelo" also features on his third studio album Magellano.)	2016	—	—	—	—	—	—		Poveri ma ricchi: Soundtrack
"Occidentali's Karma"	2017	1	57	110	14	87	25	FIMI: 6× Platinum	Magellano
"Tra le granite e le granate"	2017	19	—	—	—	—	—	FIMI: 2× Platinum	Magellano
"Pachidermi e pappagalli"	2017	— (Note: "Pachidermi e pappagalli" did not enter the Italian Singles Chart (Federazione Industria Musicale Italiana), but peaked at number 12 on the Italian Airplay Chart.)	—	—	—	—	—		Magellano
"La mia versione dei ricordi"	2017	82	—	—	—	—	—		Magellano
"Selfie del selfie"	2018	—	—	—	—	—	—		Magellano
"È un'altra cosa"	2019	— (Note: "È un'altra cosa" did not enter the Italian Singles Chart (Federazione Industria Musicale Italiana), but peaked at number 13 on the Italian Airplay Chart.)	—	—	—	—	—		Viceversa
"Viceversa"	2020	2	—	—	—	—	55	FIMI: 3× Platinum	Viceversa
"Il sudore ci appiccica"	2020	84	—	—	—	—	—	FIMI: Gold	Viceversa
"Einstein (E=mc²)"	2020	—	—	—	—	—	—		Viceversa
"La rete"	2021	—	—	—	—	—	—		Volevamo solo essere felici
"Spazio tempo"	2021	45	—	—	—	—	—	FIMI: Platinum	Volevamo solo essere felici
"Volevamo solo essere felici"	2022	—	—	—	—	—	—	FIMI: Gold	Volevamo solo essere felici
"Peace & Love"	2022	—	—	—	—	—	—		Volevamo solo essere felici
"Natale tanto vale"	2022	—	—	—	—	—	—		Volevamo solo essere felici
"L'abitudine"	2023	—	—	—	—	—	—		Non-album single
"Frutta malinconia"	2024	—	—	—	—	—	—		Dalla tua parte
"Vengo a fidarmi di te"	2025	—	—	—	—	—	—		Dalla tua parte
"Viva la vita"	2025	30	—	—	—	—	—		Dalla tua parte
4"Così come mi viene"	2025	—	—	—	—	—	—		Dalla tua parte
"Dalla mia parte"	2026	—	—	—	—	—	—		Non-album single
"—" denotes a recording that did not chart or was not released in that territory.

=== As featured artist ===
List of singles as featured artist, showing year released
Title	Year	Album
"Filodoro" (Mira Leon featuring Francesco Gabbani)	2009	Non-album single

=== Promotional singles ===
List of promotional singles, showing year released
Title	Year	Album
"Un anno in più"	2011	Non-album singles
"Estate"	2011	Non-album singles
"Maledetto amore"	2011	Non-album singles
"Svalutation"	2012	Non-album singles
