= Sanvitale =

Sanvitale is an Italian surname. It may refer to:

== People ==
- Antonio Francesco Sanvitale (1660–1714), Italian Roman Catholic cardinal
- Federico Sanvitale (1704–1761), Italian mathematician and Jesuit
- Francesca Sanvitale (1928–2011), Italian novelist and journalist
- Galeazzo Sanvitale (died 1622), Italian Roman Catholic Archbishop of Bari-Canosa (1604-06)
- Gian Galeazzo Sanvitale (1496–1550), Italian condottiero, also known as Galeazzo I Sanvitale
  - Portrait of Galeazzo Sanvitale (1524), a painting of the condottiero Gian Galeazzo Sanvitale
- Leonora Sanvitale (c. 1558–1582), Italian noblewoman and singer at the Este court at Ferrara

== Other ==
- Palazzo Sanvitale, located in central Parma, region of Emilia-Romagna, northern Italy
- Rocca Sanvitale (disambiguation)
- Sanvitale conspiracy, a plot to assassinate Ranuccio I Farnese, Duke of Parma and Piacenza
