= Sanvitale Madonna and Child =

Painting by Parmigianino from 1524

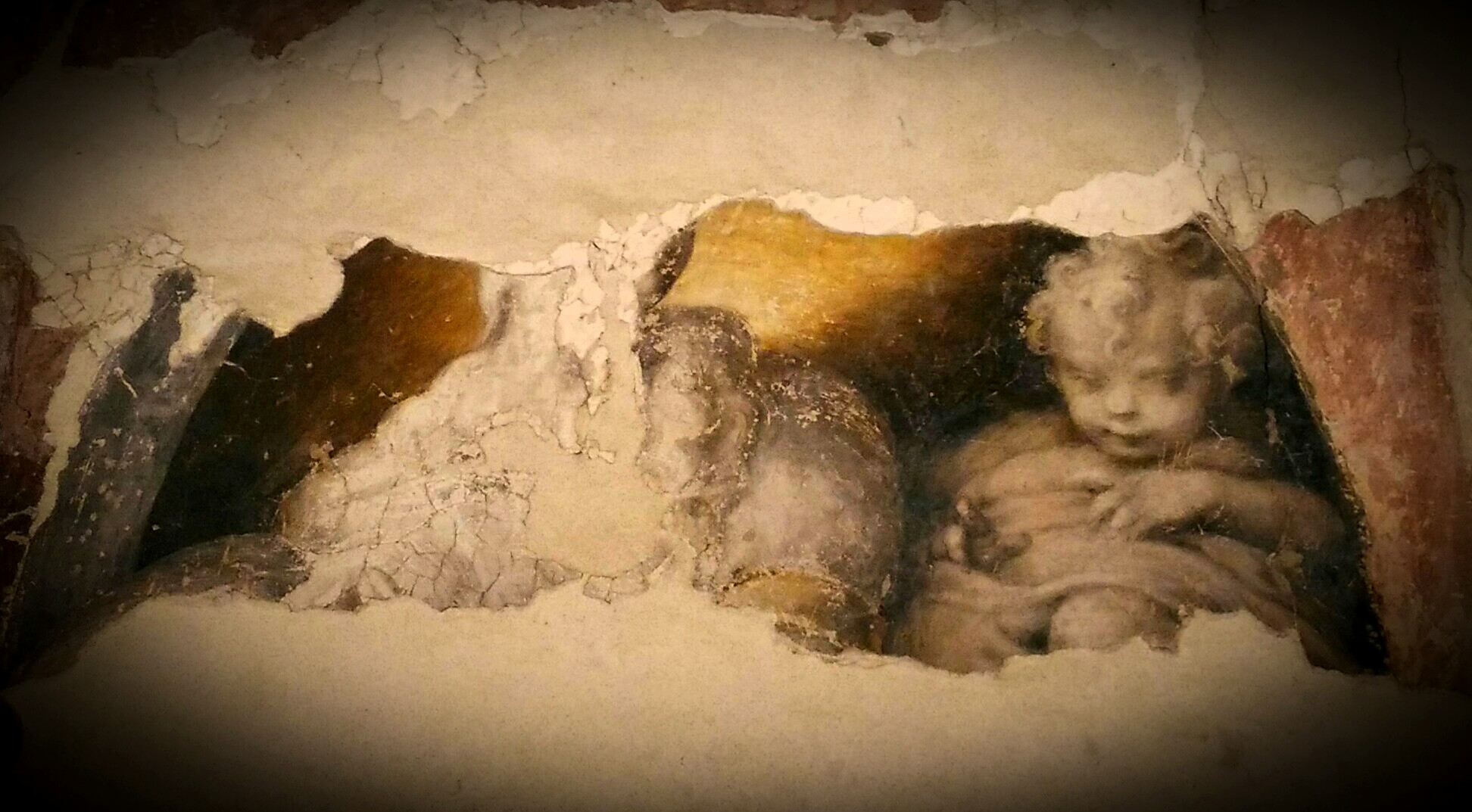
Sanvitale Madonna and Child (1524) by Parmigianino

The Sanvitale Madonna and Child is a 1524 fragment of a lunette fresco by Parmigianino at the Palazzetto Eucherio Sanvitale in Parma. It is heavily influenced by Correggio, particularly quoting his Madonna of the Stairs. It dates to just before Parmigianino set off for Rome in 1525, particularly by comparing it with his other works from that period such as his Diana and Actaeon frescoes at Rocca di Fontanellato. Preparatory drawings for the work survive in the British Museum's Department of Prints and Drawings, the Cabinet des Dessins at the Louvre and a private collection (sold at Sothebys in London on 20 April 1967).

It was discovered during restoration work and first published in 1978. Its composition matches that in a print by Francesco Rosaspina and several painted copies, one in Antonio Pirri's collection in Rome and another oil on canvas work from the Farnese Collection now in the Museo di Capodimonte in Naples. The original fresco is held to have been commissioned by the palazzo's then owner Galeazzo Sanvitale, though in 1998 Frlotti theorised it may have been painted for someone else and that the "Palazzetto Eucherio Sanvitale" then corresponded to the original nucleus of the Palazzo del Giardino rather than to the building now known as the Palazzetto Eucherio Sanvitale.
