= Vice Versa =

Vice Versa may refer to:

- Vice versa, a Latin phrase, 'the other way around'

== Film ==
- Vice Versa (1916 film), a film adaptation of Thomas Anstey Guthrie's 1882 novel with the same name, starring Charles Rock
- Vice Versa (1948 film), the third film adaptation of Guthrie's novel, starring Roger Livesey
- Vice Versa (1988 film), the fourth film adaptation of Guthrie's novel, featuring Judge Reinhold

== Literature ==
- Vice Versa (magazine), a publication for lesbians
- Vice Versa (novel), an 1882 novel by Thomas Anstey Guthrie
- Vice Versa (play), a play by Edward Rose, based on the novel
- Vice Versa: Bisexuality and the Eroticism of Everyday Life, a book by Marjorie Garber
- Éditions Vice-Versa, a magazine at the centre of Aubry v Éditions Vice-Versa Inc, a leading Supreme Court of Canada case about Quebec privacy rights

== Music ==
- Vice Versa (Funkstörung album), released in 2001
- Vice Versa (band), a band from Sheffield, England
- Vice Versa (Rauw Alejandro album), released in 2021
- Viceversa (Francesco Gabbani album), released in 2020
  - "Viceversa" (song), the title track from the album
- Viceversa (Gilberto Santa Rosa album), released in 2002

== See also ==
- Vice Versas, a 1991 type of chocolate produced by Nestlé
- Vice Verses, a 2011 alternative rock album by Switchfoot
- Vice (disambiguation)
