= Magellano =

Studio album by Francesco Gabbani
- Released: 28 April 2017
- Recorded: 2016
- Genre: Pop
- Length: 30:05
- Label: BMG Rights Management
- Producer: Luca Chiaravalli

Francesco Gabbani chronology
| Eternamente ora (2016) | Magellano (2017) | Viceversa (2020) |

Singles from Magellano
- 1. "Occidentali's Karma" Released: 10 February 2017; 2. "Tra le granite E le granate" Released: 8 May 2017; 3. "Pachidermi e pappagalli" Released: 15 September 2017; 4. "La mia versione dei ricordi" Released: 24 November 2017

Magellano is the third studio album by Italian singer-songwriter Francesco Gabbani. It was released in Italy through BMG Rights Management on 28 April 2017, and was released worldwide on 12 May 2017 under the title Magellan. The album debuted at number 1 on the Italian Albums Chart. It includes the single "Occidentali's Karma", with which he represented Italy at the Eurovision Song Contest 2017, finishing in 6th place.

== Background ==
In April 2017, Gabbani announced on Facebook that he would be releasing his third studio album, Magellano, on 28 April 2017 and the album would include his Eurovision song "Occidentali's Karma". To promote the album, Gabbani embarked on a tour, and held several shows across Italy from 19 June to 9 September 2017.

== Singles ==
"Occidentali's Karma" was released as the lead single from the album on 10 February 2017. The song peaked at number 1 on the Italian Singles Chart. The song has also charted in Switzerland. In February 2017, Gabbani won Sanremo Music Festival 2017 and accepted the invitation to represent Italy in the Eurovision Song Contest, which was held at the International Exhibition Centre in Kyiv, Ukraine. As a member of the "Big 5", Italy automatically qualified to compete in the final, which took place on 13 May 2017. "Tra le granite e le granate" was released as the second single from the album on 8 May 2017. The song peaked at number 19 on the Italian Singles Chart.

== Track listing ==
Standard version
| No. | Title | Writer(s) | Producer(s) | Length |
|---|---|---|---|---|
| 1. | "Magellano" | Francesco Gabbani; Luca Chiaravalli; Fabio Ilacqua; Filippo Gabbani | Luca Chiaravalli | 3:23 |
| 2. | "Tra le granite e le granate" | Gabbani; Chiaravalli; Ilacqua; Gabbani | Chiaravalli | 3:09 |
| 3. | "Occidentali's Karma" (Radio Edit) | Gabbani; Chiaravalli; Ilacqua; Gabbani | Chiaravalli | 3:37 |
| 4. | "A Moment of Silence" | Gabbani; Chiaravalli; Ilacqua | Chiaravalli | 3:04 |
| 5. | "La mia versione dei ricordi" | Gabbani; Chiaravalli; Ilacqua; Gabbani | Chiaravalli | 3:25 |
| 6. | "Susanna, Susanna" | Gabbani; Ilacqua; Miki Del Prete; Ferdy Lancee; Sergio Caputo; Caroline Bogman; Mark Foggo | Chiaravalli | 2:43 |
| 7. | "Foglie al gelo" | Gabbani; Chiaravalli; Ilacqua; Luca Danesi | Chiaravalli | 3:26 |
| 8. | "Pachidermi e pappagalli" | Gabbani; Chiaravalli; Ilacqua; Gabbani | Chiaravalli | 3:22 |
| 9. | "Spogliarmi" | Gabbani; Chiaravalli | Chiaravalli | 3:56 |
| Total length: | | | | 30:05 |

Magellan
| No. | Title | Writer(s) | Producer(s) | Length |
|---|---|---|---|---|
| 1. | "Magellano" | Francesco Gabbani; Luca Chiaravalli; Fabio Ilacqua; Filippo Gabbani | Luca Chiaravalli | 3:23 |
| 2. | "Tra le granite e le granate" | Gabbani; Chiaravalli; Ilacqua; Gabbani | Chiaravalli | 3:09 |
| 3. | "Occidentali's Karma" (Radio Edit) | Gabbani; Chiaravalli; Ilacqua; Gabbani | Chiaravalli | 3:37 |
| 4. | "A Moment of Silence" | Gabbani; Chiaravalli; Ilacqua | Chiaravalli | 3:04 |
| 5. | "Amen" (Radio Edit) | Gabbani; Ilacqua | Chiaravalli | 3:16 |
| 6. | "La mia versione dei ricordi" | Gabbani; Chiaravalli; Ilacqua; Gabbani | Chiaravalli | 3:25 |
| 7. | "Susanna, Susanna" | Gabbani; Ilacqua; Miki Del Prete; Ferdy Lancee; Sergio Caputo; Caroline Bogman; Mark Foggo | Chiaravalli | 2:43 |
| 8. | "Foglie al gelo" | Gabbani; Chiaravalli; Ilacqua; Luca Danesi | Chiaravalli | 3:26 |
| 9. | "Pachidermi e pappagalli" | Gabbani; Chiaravalli; Ilacqua; Gabbani | Chiaravalli | 3:22 |
| 10. | "Spogliarmi" | Gabbani; Chiaravalli | | 3:56 |

== Charts ==
=== Weekly charts ===
| Chart (2017) | Peak position |
|---|---|
| Belgian Albums (Ultratop Wallonia) | 174 |
| Italian Albums (FIMI) | 1 |
| Swiss Albums (Schweizer Hitparade) | 35 |

=== Year-end charts ===
| Chart (2017) | Position |
|---|---|
| Italian Albums (FIMI) | 16 |

== Release history ==
| Region | Date | Format | Label |
|---|---|---|---|
| Italy | 28 April 2017 | Digital download | BMG Rights Management |
