= Vice (disambiguation) =

Vice is the opposite of virtue.

Vice may also refer to:

== People with the name ==
- Vice, a professional name for James Kennaby, who established Street Soul Productions
- Vice Ganda (born 1976), Filipino actor and comedian
- Vice Adamović (1838–1919), Writer and historian from Dubrovnik
- Vice Erak (born 2001), Croatian water polo player
- Vice Jurišić (1909–1993), Croatian rower
- Vice Vukov (1936–2008), Croatian singer and politician
- Brad Vice (born 1973), American writer

== Arts, entertainment, and media ==
=== Fictional characters ===
- Vice (character), a character representing evil in medieval morality plays
- Vice (The King of Fighters), a video game character from the King of Fighters series
- Vice, one of the main characters in Kamen Rider Revice

=== Films ===
- Vice (2008 film), a drama film starring Michael Madsen and Daryl Hannah
- Vice (2015 film), an action film starring Bruce Willis
- Vice (2018 film), a biopic of former United States Vice President Dick Cheney, starring Christian Bale and Amy Adams
- The Vice (film), a 1915 German silent drama film

=== Games and gaming ===
- VICE, an emulator program, the Versatile Commodore Emulator
- Vice: Project Doom, a 1991 Nintendo video game
- Vice squeeze or the Vice, a squeeze play in the card game contract bridge

=== Music ===
==== Albums ====
- Vices (Dead Poetic album), 2006
- Vices (Kick Axe album), 1984
- Vices (Paradime album), 2001
- Vices (Waysted album), 1983
- Vices, a 1990 album by Circus of Power

==== Songs ====
- "Vice", by Grandmaster Melle Mel from the 1985 Miami Vice soundtrack
- "Vice" (Miranda Lambert song), 2016
- "Vice" (Razorlight song), 2004
- "Vices", by Silverstein from their 2009 album A Shipwreck in the Sand
- "Vices", by Brand New from their 2009 album Daisy
- "Vices", by Slayer from their 2015 album Repentless

=== Television ===
- Archer: Vice, the fifth season of the animated adult spy sitcom Archer
- The Vice (TV series), an ITV police drama

=== Vice Media ===
- Vice Media, Canadian-American digital media and broadcasting company
  - Vice (magazine), New York City–based (originally Montreal-based) international arts and culture magazine
  - Vice (TV series), a news program airing on Showtime
  - Vice News, news division of Vice Media
  - Vice News Tonight, a nightly American news program broadcast on Vice on TV
  - Viceland, multinational television channel brand owned and programmed by Vice Media

== Other uses ==
- Vice, a Latin word meaning "in place of"
- Vice, the Hungarian name for Viţa village, Nușeni Commune, Bistriţa-Năsăud County, Romania
- Vice (or vice-skip), an alternate term for the third in curling
- Vise or vice, a screw apparatus for clamping work

== See also ==
- Vice Squad (disambiguation)
- Vice Versa (disambiguation)
- Vicious (disambiguation), which can mean "full of vice"
- Vise (disambiguation)
