= Tra le granite e le granate =

Single by Francesco Gabbani

from the album Magellano
- Released: 8 May 2017
- Genre: Pop
- Length: 3:09
- Label: BMG Rights Management
- Songwriter(s): Francesco Gabbani; Luca Chiaravalli; Fabio Ilacqua; Filippo Gabbani
- Producer(s): Luca Chiaravalli

Francesco Gabbani singles chronology
"Occidentali's Karma" (2017)	"Tra le granite e le granate" (2017)	"Pachidermi e pappagalli" (2017)

"Tra le granite e le granate" ("Between the slushes and the grenades") is a song by Italian singer-songwriter Francesco Gabbani. The song was released as a digital download on 8 May 2017 by BMG Rights Management as the second single from his third studio album Magellano (2017). The song peaked at number 19 on the Italian Singles Chart. The title is also written "Tra le granite E le granate", with a capital E for the word for "summer", Estate in Italian, as Gabbani said in an interview with La Stampa.

== Music video ==
A music video to accompany the release of "Tra le granite E le granate" was first released onto YouTube on 8 May 2017 at a total length of three minutes and nine seconds.

== Track listing ==
Digital download
No.	Title	Length
1.	"Tra le granite E le granate"	3:09

== Charts ==
=== Weekly charts ===
Chart (2017)	Peak position
Italy (FIMI)	19
Italy Airplay (EarOne)	1
San Marino (RTV)	1

=== Year-end charts ===
Chart (2017)	Position
Italy (FIMI)	67

== Certifications ==
Region	Certification	Certified units/sales
Italy (FIMI)	2× Platinum	100,000^{‡}
^{‡} Sales+streaming figures based on certification alone.

== Release history ==
Region	Date	Format	Label
Italy	8 May 2017	Digital download	BMG Rights Management
