= Occidentali's Karma =

2017 Francesco Gabbani song

Single by Francesco Gabbani

from the album Magellano
- Released: 10 February 2017
- Recorded: 2016
- Genre: Electropop; indie pop
- Length: 3:37 (original version); 3:08 (ESC version)
- Label: BMG
- Songwriters: Francesco Gabbani; Filippo Gabbani; Fabio Ilacqua; Luca Chiaravalli

Francesco Gabbani singles chronology
"Foglie al gelo" (2016)	"Occidentali's Karma" (2017)	"Tra le granite e le granate" (2017)

Music video
- "Occidentali's Karma" on YouTube

Eurovision Song Contest 2017 entry
- Country: Italy
- Artist: Francesco Gabbani
- Language: Italian
- Composers: Francesco Gabbani; Filippo Gabbani; Luca Chiaravalli
- Lyricists: Francesco Gabbani; Fabio Ilacqua; Luca Chiaravalli

Finals performance
- Final result: 6th
- Final points: 334

Entry chronology
- ◄ "No Degree of Separation" (2016)
- "Non mi avete fatto niente" (2018) ►

"Occidentali's Karma" (pronounced [ottʃidenˈtalis ˈkarma]; transl. Westerners' Karma), originally titled "Occidentalis Karma" (transl. Western Karma in Latin), is a song performed by Italian singer Francesco Gabbani. The song was released as a digital download on 10 February 2017 through BMG Rights Management as the lead single from his third studio album, Magellano (2017). The song was written by Gabbani and his younger brother Filippo Gabbani, alongside Fabio Ilacqua and Luca Chiaravalli.

Reflecting a critique of Orientalism, the lyrics include many cultural references, ranging from Eastern civilisation to Greek philosophy. It won the Sanremo Music Festival 2017 and represented Italy in the Eurovision Song Contest 2017, finishing in sixth place while winning the media and press award. Its music video earned millions of views, becoming the most viewed Italian video in a single day on Vevo and the first Eurovision song to reach 100 million views.

"Occidentali's Karma" received generally positive reviews for its lyrics and catchy nature, with its video and live performances including a dancing monkey (played by choreographer Filippo Ranaldi) going viral. After obtaining a surprise win in the Sanremo final, Gabbani's song was widely considered among the frontrunners at Eurovision, and as a result its sixth-place finish proved disappointing for both Gabbani and Italy, sparking a series of Internet memes.

The song won numerous certified units accomplishments. It debuted at number-one on the Italian FIMI Top Digital chart, and was certified gold, platinum, and double platinum within a month. It set a record as the fastest-selling song in Italy and received the highest number of weekly streams, earning a six-time platinum certification. It also earned recognition as the most viewed Eurovision video, among the best singles for the year, and among the best Italian songs since 1975.

== Lyrics and themes ==
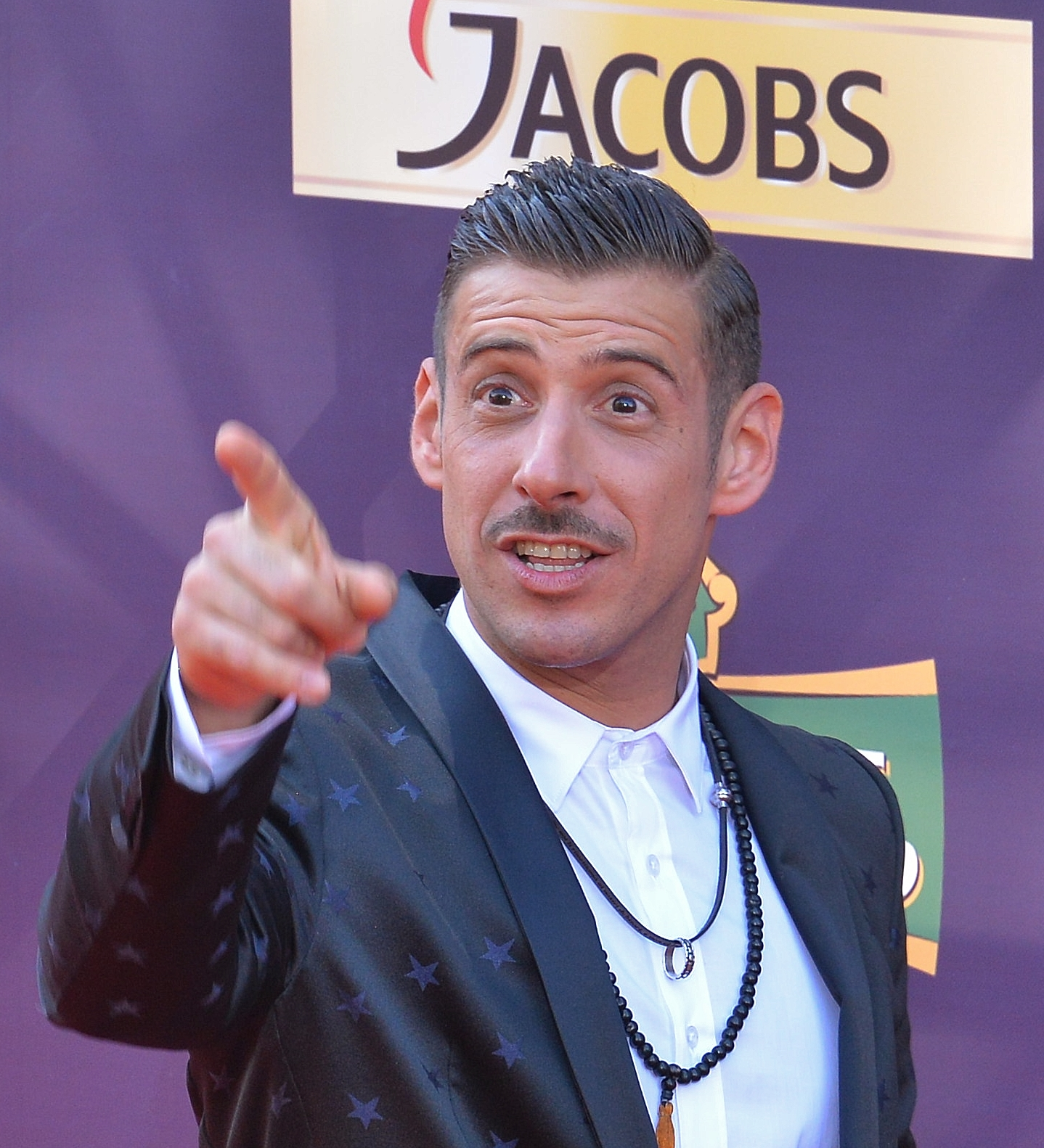
Gabbani in 2017

"Occidentali's Karma" was written in the summer of 2016. Described as a catchy dance pop song, as well as "a cheekily sardonic look at human evolution", the main theme of "Occidentali's Karma" is the superficial lifestyle of Westerners, mainly based on materialism and appearance, discussing Buddhism, spirituality, and other philosophical views of modern life. In a critique of Western consumerism, the lyrics refer to the Internet as the "opiate of the poor" (in reference to Karl Marx and the "opium of the people"), selfie addiction, Internet know-it-alls, and a society based on conformity and uniformity, referencing "intellectuals in cafes" and deriding "honorary members of the selfie-addicted anonymous". As a result, human evolution seems to stumble instead of moving forward (l'evoluzione inciampa, la scimmia nuda balla).

The most recurring reference is the comparison of Homo sapiens to a hairless primate but with a similar behaviour. According to Gabbani, the chorus of the song is a mockery of Westerners who believe they can take Eastern cultures and "Westernise" them. The song cites such aspects of Indian religions as the Buddha and Nirvana, as well as man's evolution from the ape, an idea which he got from reading The Naked Ape (1967), written by British ethologist Desmond Morris. It also references the ancient Greek pre-Socratic philosopher Heraclitus and his panta rhei.

Commentators and observers found references to American musicals (Singin' in the Rain), Charles Darwin, Epicurus, Immanuel Kant, Gene Kelly, Marilyn Monroe, the Neolithic man, William Shakespeare, and Andy Warhol. Further cited references included Planet of the Apes and 2001: A Space Odyssey for its choreography and stage costume, as well as The Decline of the West of Oswald Spengler, with one commentator observing that "it alludes, if not to the title of Oswald Spengler's text (The Decline of the West), at least to a simplification of the concept debated therein."

As told to La Repubblica, Gabbani said that only the references to the Buddha, Heraclitus, Marx, Morris, Nirvana, and Shakespeare's Hamlet (c. 1599–1601) were true, and that Ilacqua is a passionate admirer of Morris and that he had read some of his summaries. The song's writers wanted to highlight the way in which Westerners tend to trivialise Eastern culture, using it as a sort of anti-stress remedy. Gabbani explained that "Occidentali's Karma" is "a sarcastic reflection on the clumsy attempt we Westerners make to seek serenity through Eastern disciplines, only to discover that, stripped of Western or Eastern superstructures, we're all naked apes."

In an interview with La Repubblica, Morris praised the song for the "clear and fanciful reference to the theories" described by him and for "the precision and sophistication of the lyrics" like Bob Dylan and John Lennon. Morris also added that he wanted Gabbani to win the Eurovision Song Contest and recounted: "A British journalist asked me if he had offended me ... What an honor instead! I've been studying for years the sign language in the world, and seeing what Gabbani does on stage and in the official video of the song is extraordinary since he combines and blends different cultures and quotes." Similarly, philosopher Gianni Vattimo praised it by stating that "Occidentali's Karma" could have been written by Umberto Eco.

The song begins with a reference to Hamlet, where "To be, or not to be" is changed to "To be, or have to be" (essere o dover essere), as Gabbani wanted to highlight how modern society is divided between spirituality and appearances, describing people as "selfie-addicted". The use of the Saxon genitive in the song title and chorus, which was ideated by Ilacqua, is a further critique of the tendency toward anglicisation of the Italian language, with the song originally titled in Latin as "Occidentalis Karma". It was considered among the best singles of 2017, and was included among the 45 most beautiful songs of Italian music within the 2020 radio event I Love My Radio.

== Sanremo Music Festival 2017 ==
Gabbani was the winner of the Sanremo Music Festival 2016 with his song "Amen" in the "New Proposal" category, also winning the Critics' Award named after Mia Martini and the Best Lyrics award named after Sergio Bardotti. On 11 December 2016, Gabbani was confirmed to be one of the artists who would be competing in the campioni ("champions") section of the Sanremo Music Festival 2017. Gabbani performed the song for the first time at the Ariston Theatre during the second night of the contest on 8 February 2017.

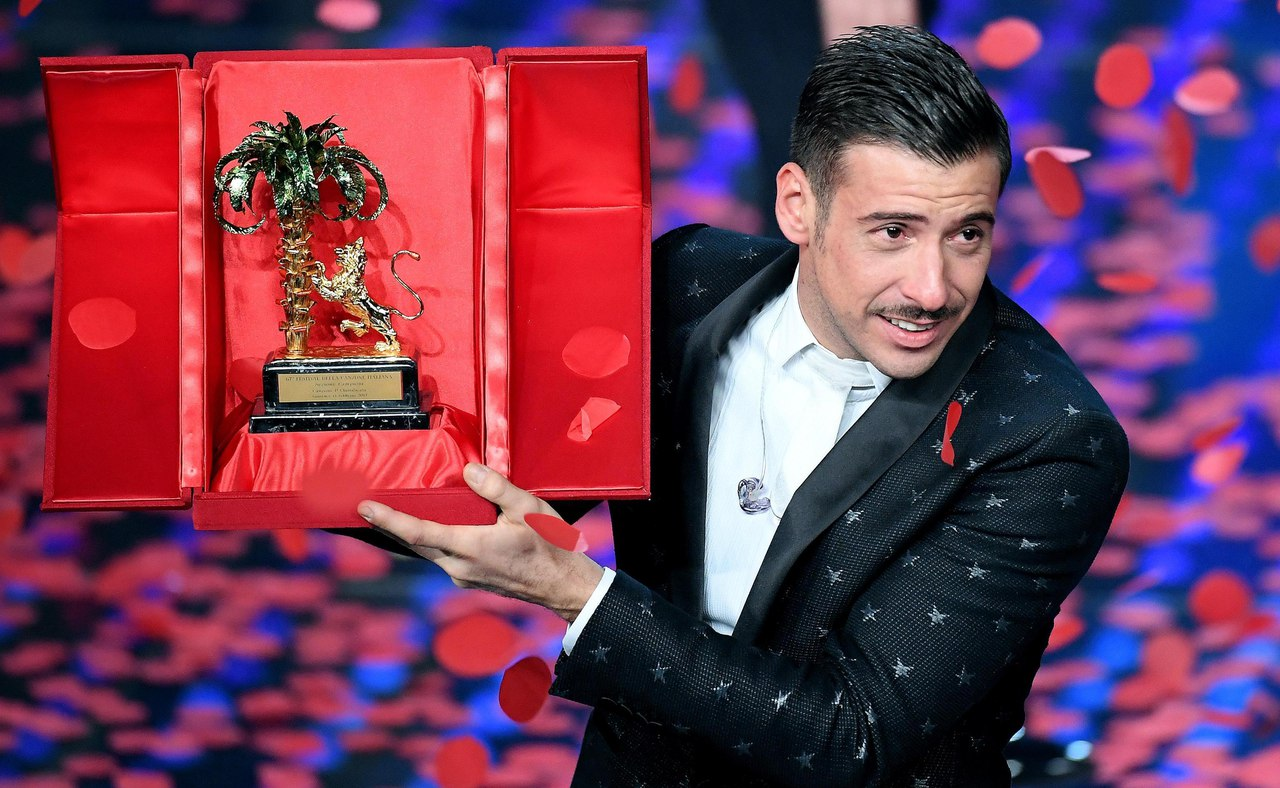
Gabbani with his Sanremo trophy

During his performance, Ranaldi appeared on stage and danced with Gabbani while dressed in a gorilla costume, which reprised the idea of The Naked Ape also cited in the song's lyrics, and became the hallmark of his act, with Gabbani referring to Ranaldi as "the monkeygrapher" (lo scimmiografo). Ranaldi is a hip-hop choreographer with his N.ough company who also worked on the Italian edition of X Factor. The choreography immediately went viral, which was reminiscent of "Gangnam Style" by Psy when the then United Nations Secretary-General Ban Ki-moon learned a few dance steps. Gabbani himself stated that the gorilla dance helped him win Sanremo, and T-shirts bearing La scimmia nuda balla ("The Naked Ape Is Dancing") were made.

On 11 February 2017, Gabbani advanced to the final, which was watched by 12 million Italians in prime time; overall, the 2017 edition of Sanremo won by Gabbani drew an average nightly audience of 10.8 million, or a 50 percent national TV share. Initially considered to be a long shot for the win, "Occidentali's Karma" eventually attracted significant attention, and SNAI opened betting on what Gabbani would wear for the final. In an upset, Gabbani defeated Fiorella Mannoia and Ermal Meta, winning not only the competition but also the right to represent Italy at Eurovision 2017. Gabbani said that had he not participated, he would have voted for Mannoia. It was the first time that a singer won back-to-back the "Newcomers" and "Big Artists" (also referred to as the "Bigs") categories, and he also won the TIM Music Award as the most listened song on its streaming music service. According to Andrea Vittori, Gabbani's manager and communications expert, his back-to-back Sanremo wins were as if "Chievo had gone from Serie B to winning the Scudetto in two years".

== Eurovision Song Contest ==
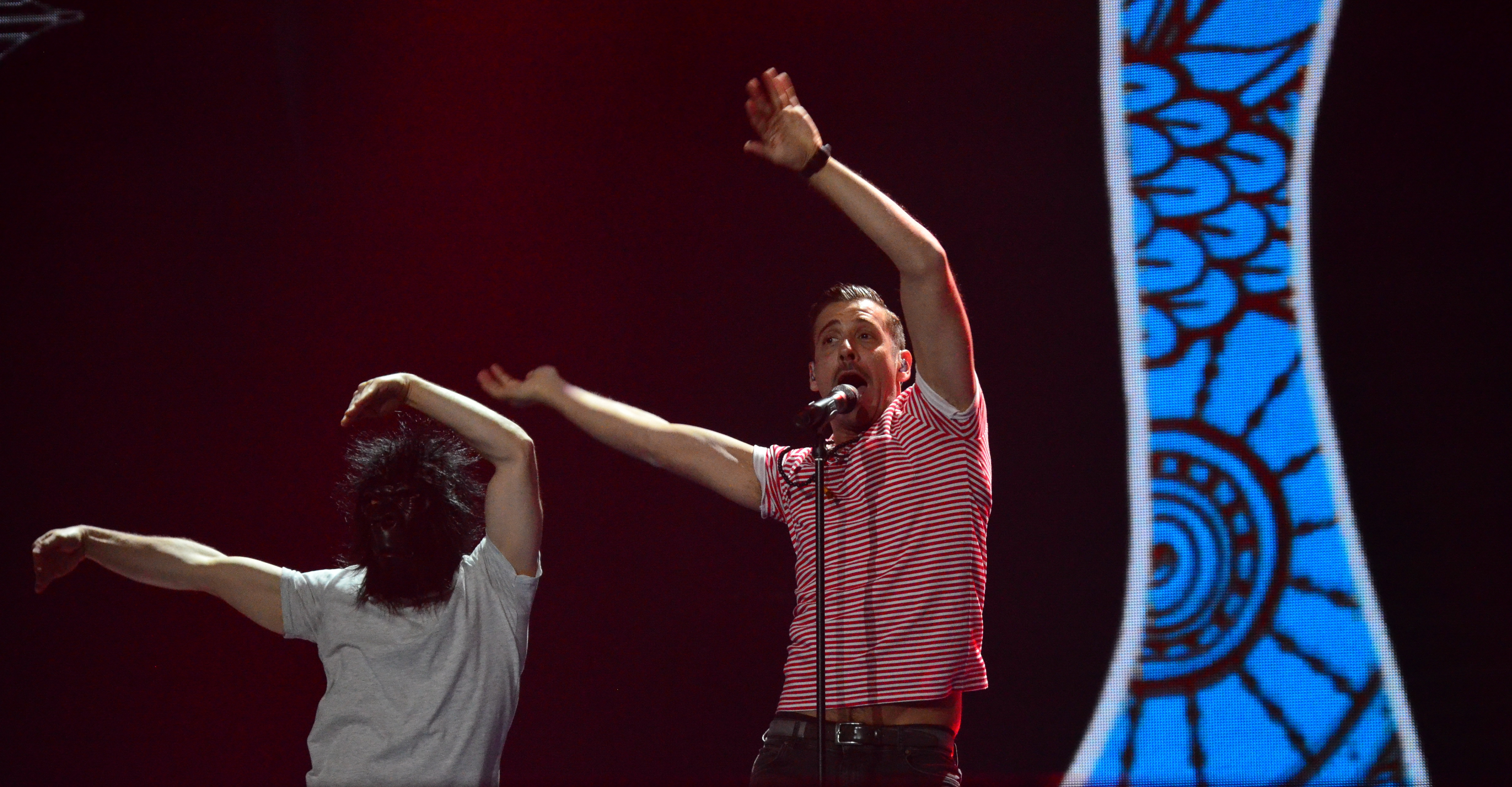
Gabbani and Ranaldi during their dress rehearsal performance

Following his win, it was confirmed by RAI (Italy's public broadcaster) and the European Broadcasting Union that Gabbani had accepted the invitation to represent Italy in the Eurovision Song Contest, which is given to the winner of the Sanremo Music Festival, and that he would be performing "Occidentali's Karma" at Eurovision, held in Kyiv, Ukraine, in what was its 62nd edition. As Italy is a member of the "Big Five", plus Ukraine as the host, he automatically advanced to the final in Kyiv. Gabbani was considered by bookmakers to be among the favourites to win, alongside for example the eventual winner, the Portuguese balladeer Salvador Sobral with "Amar pelos dois" ("To Love for the Both of Us").

Upon his Sanremo's win, Italy's odds for an Eurovision win immediately dropped from 66/1 to 6/1. William Lee Adams, the owner of the website Wiwibloggs, said that "Italy pretty much has this in the bag", further stating: "He's got this X-factor ... Perhaps the controversy with Russia and Ukraine has left people wanting something fun and frothy, and this gives them that." Adams referred to the Russian entrant Yuliya Samoylova, who was banned by host Ukraine because she held concert tours in Crimea even after the 2014 Russian annexation of Crimea. Eurovision historian John Kennedy O'Connor, who is also the author of Eurovision's official history, said that "Occidentali's Karma" had the qualities of a Eurovision classic, stating: "It's so out there and it's so outrageous and it's so silly ... But it's also very, very catchy."

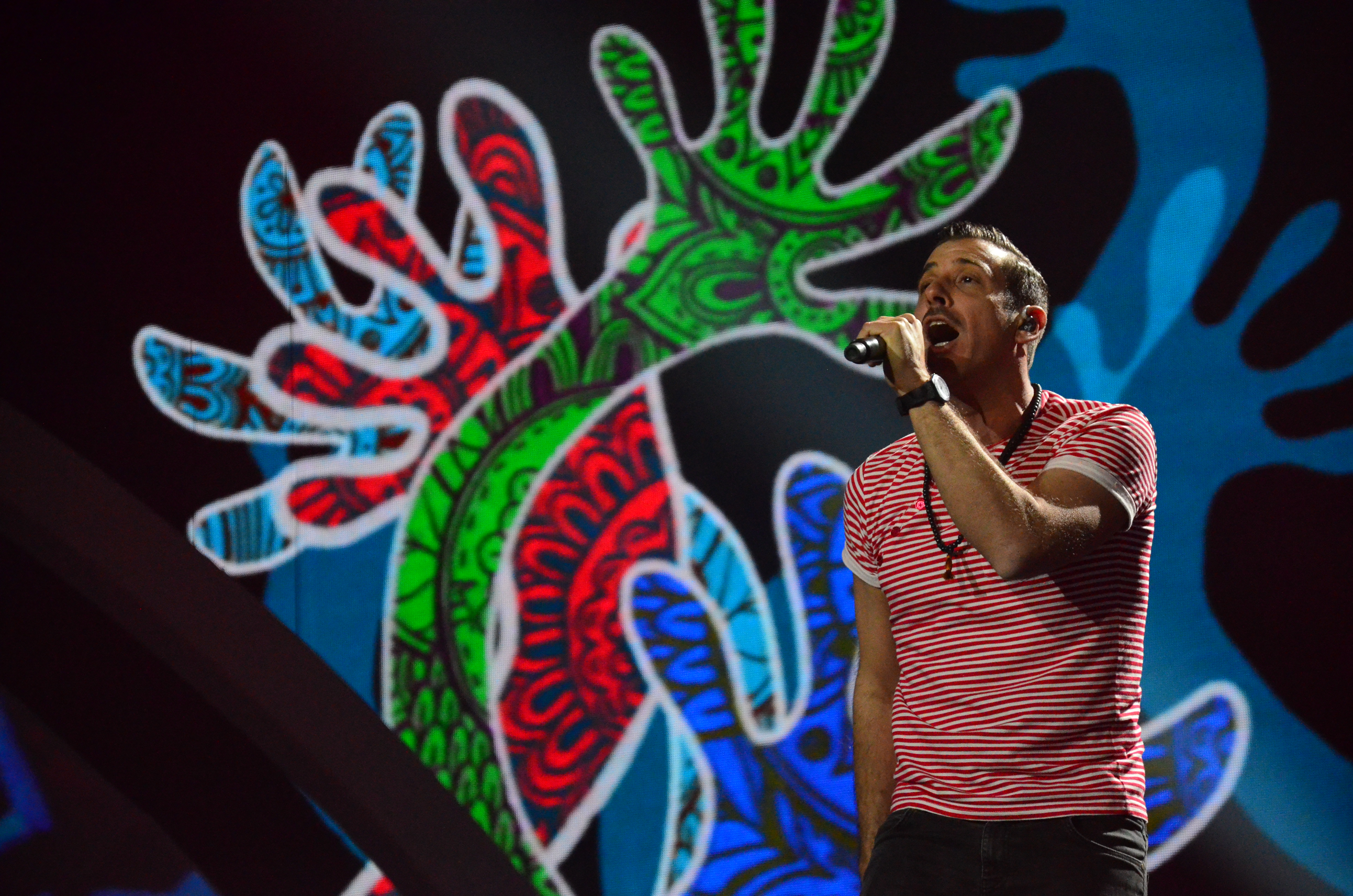
Gabbani performing "Occidentali's Karma" at Eurovision

On 5 May 2017, Gabbani performed his first rehearsal. On 13 May 2017, the song finished sixth at the final, with 334 points, and won the Marcel Bezençon Award given to the best entry as voted on by the accredited media and press during the event. The general consensus in April 2017 was that "Italy needs to make a mistake if it is going to lose the Eurovision Song Contest." Gabbani's early favourite status may also hindered the song's performance as a strong song may lose some of its power by the final, as well as by significant competition and the fact that many performers stepped up as a result.

In Italy, many felt robbed as they thought that Gabbani's song deserved to win, also claiming that a tweet by the BBC (subsequently deleted) negatively affected Gabbani's chances. Under the BBC Eurovision Twitter account, it stated: "Go home Italy you're drunk. (Oh god, we hope you're drunk.)" As a result of his defeat, the Striscia la notizia correspondent Valerio Staffelli presented the Golden Tapir to Gabbani for his placement in the Eurovision Song Contest. Gabbani humorously responded: "I lost because I wanted to receive the Golden Tapir and because I'm a believer in reversing expectations. At Sanremo, I wasn't expected to win, and the situation reversed. When I left for Kiev, however, I was considered the clear favorite, and I said, 'Okay guys, let's go and perform a song in Ukraine...' and then that's how it went." Italians also felt betrayed by San Marino, having given Italy only 3 points, sparking jokes and Internet memes about Italy's declaring war on San Marino.

"Occidentali's Karma" is the first song in Eurovision history to feature words in Sanskrit, while being the second entry to have words in Ancient Greek, the first being "Pia prosefhi" by Elina Konstantopoulou representing Greece in the Eurovision Song Contest 1995. Additionally, the song features words in English and French. During an interview to Soundsblog, Chiaravalli, one of the authors and producers of the song, said that the lyrics would probably be changed before the Eurovision live performance. According to the Eurovision rules, the song cannot last more than three minutes, and therefore the track must be shortened. A sentence containing the word "Chanel" was one of the things removed as it is a registered trademark. During the TV program Standing Ovation broadcast on Rai 1, Gabbani declared that the song would remain with the lyrics in Italian. On 17 March 2017, the official Eurovision version of the song was published. In later years, he recalled that the other Eurovision singers called him "Spaghetti with Monkey".

== Music video ==
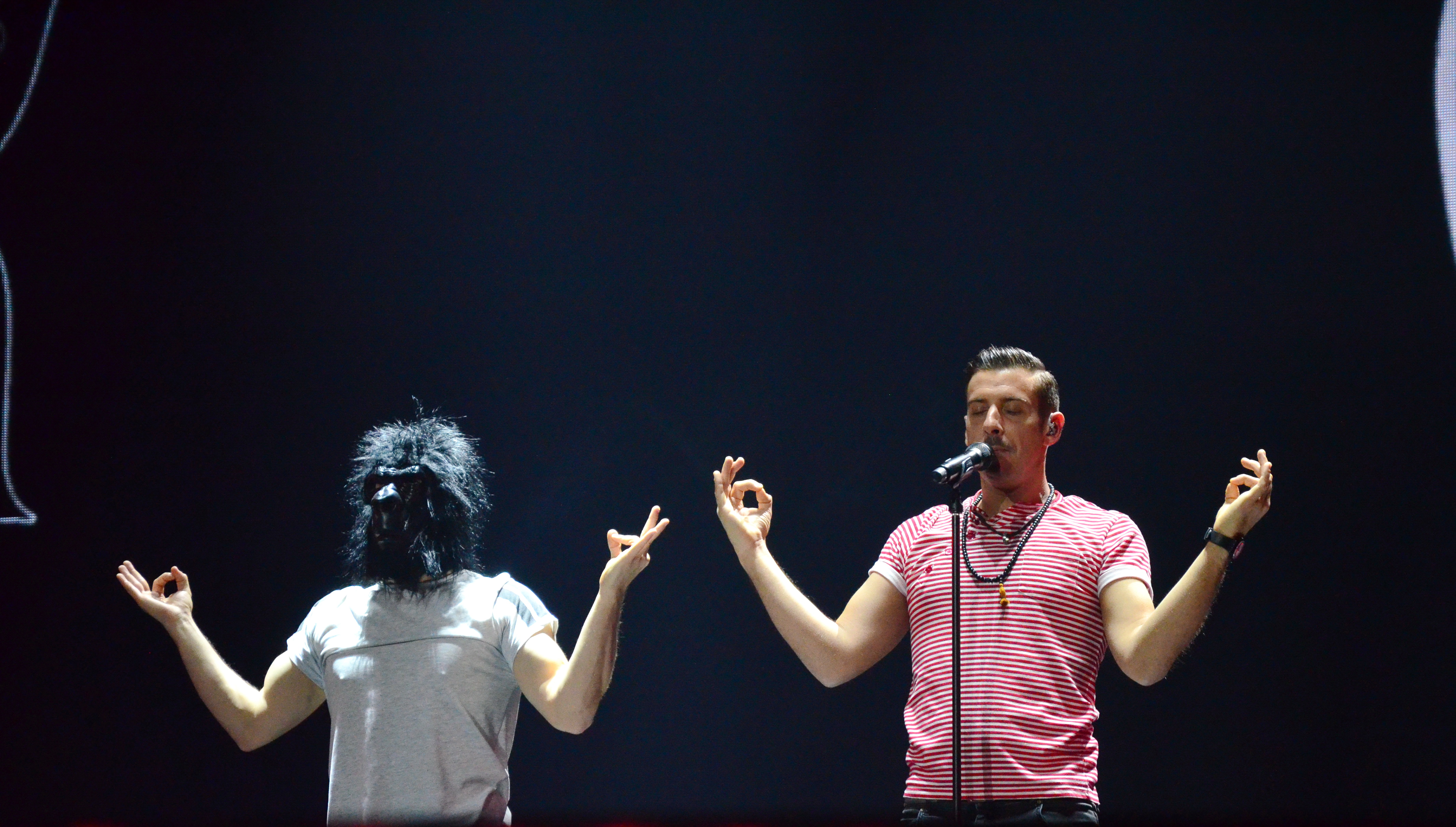
Gabbani with Ranaldi wearing a gorilla face mask

The accompanying music video for the song, released on 9 February 2017 and directed by Gabriele Lucchetti, was filmed inside a Buddhist monastery, the Sanbo-ji Zen monastery Temple of the Three Jewels in Pagazzano, Berceto, in the province of Parma. In the video, Gabbani is involved in various actions, including practicing meditation in front of a statuette of the Buddha and playing with his band; most notably, it features a dancing monkey, performed by Ranaldi in a gorilla costume. Gabbani said he "came up with the idea of the monkey myself — it's a way to express the naked ape from the lyrics on stage".

On 14 February 2017 alone, the video for "Occidentali's Karma" was viewed 4,353,802 times on Vevo, setting a new record for the number of single-day views on the platform by an Italian music video. With those numbers, it was projected to hit 10 millions views within five days, and ultimately reached this milestone in six days. Such a significant number of views and exposure were unheard of for a Eurovision entry, to which Gabbani explained: "The magic formula is not just in the song but what the song transmits. That it is being viewed abroad is proof of that. They don't understand the words -- and yet you feel the vibe." After Eurovision, Gabbani went on to tour across Italy without Ranaldi, stating: "He's done his time. His role was to explain in as amusing a fashion as possible the point of the song. With all his fur he'll be fine in Ukraine."

"Occidentali's Karma" shot to the top of the iTunes download charts in record time, ranked second in Google searches for lyrics, and its music video achieved 6.5 million as of 16 February 2017. Gabbani joked that this was "all thanks to the monkey" appearing in the video. The song was also published with the music video in Spanish and with English subtitles. On 20 February 2017, the Italian video on YouTube had over 22 millions views. By 9 March 2017, with around 2 millions daily views, the video surpassed 50 million views and also earned a Catholic parody, among many other parodies, by the Genoese priest and Internet personality Roberto Fiscer with "Lo vinci con quest'arma". A few days later, it reached 55 million views and 100,000 streams. Amid what was dubbed "Gabbani-Mania", the song earned Facebook pages, gifs, and photomontages featuring the monkey of the video, which achieved 40 million views in less than a month while being the top song on the radio for the second time in a raw. Gabbani celebrated this milestone by meeting his fellow Carrara citizen Gianluigi Buffon, the then captain and goalkeeper of Juventus (the football club of which he is a tifoso), who gave him the black and white shirt with the squad number 1 and the name Gabbani on it. Later in March 2017, the song continued to top iTunes charts and the weekly airplay radio, with over 55 million views.

Within 10 weeks, another record, the video reached 100 million views on 24 April 2017, becoming the first ever song from the Eurovision Song Contest to do so, as well as the song with the most viewed video in the history of Eurovision. On 9 August 2017, it reached over 150 millions views. On 6 December 2017, "Occidentali's Karma" was crowned the most-viewed Italian video of 2017 and the fastest Italian video ever to reach 100 million views. According to an in-depth analysis of the 2017 Radio Airplay chart data compiled by EarOne, Gabbani was the most played artist on Italian radio, considering the releases of national and international singles during the year. This result was achieved by adding together the scores of the four singles released in 2017, namely "Occidentali's Karma", "Tra le granite e le granate", "Pachidermi e pappagalli", and "La mia versione dei ricordi". As of December 2017, "Occidentali's Karma" had nearly 170 million views and was the most-viewed Italian video of 2017 (the overall first place on YouTube Rewind for the year was "Despacito" by Luis Fonsi). In September 2018, it reached over 200 millions views.

== Commercial performance ==
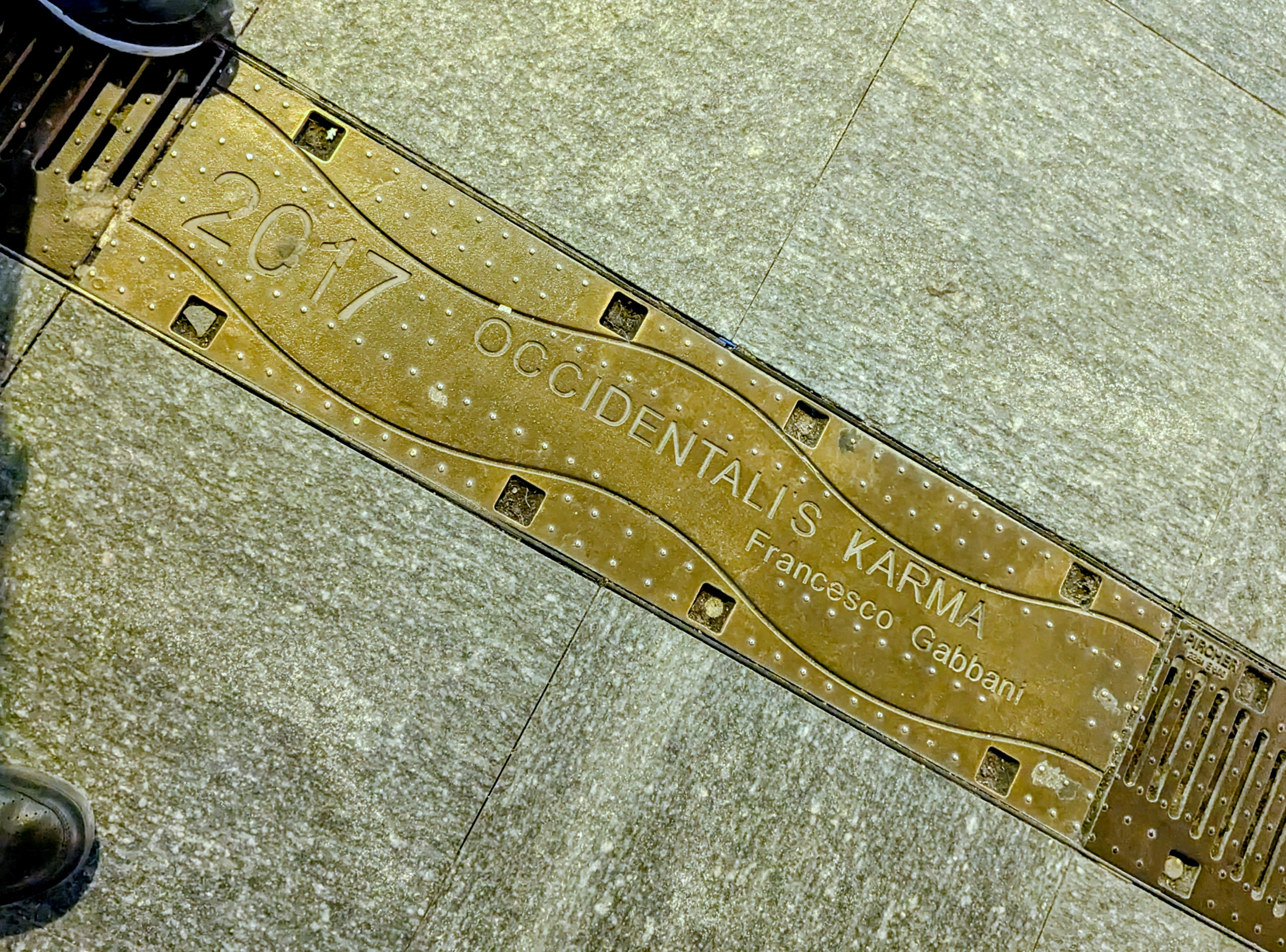
The plaque celebrating "Occidentali's Karma" as the winning song of Sanremo in 2017

In its first week of release, "Occidentali's Karma" was certified gold by the Italian FIMI Top Digital chart for selling more than 25,000 copies, and was the first song to be certified gold within a week. In doing so, it had recorded the highest number of streams (2,472,000) and entered at number 1 on the singles charts with the highest number of streams plus downloads (47,175). With over 50,000 downloads and streams, it achieved platinum certification two weeks after its release, equalling Marco Mengoni's record with "L'essenziale", the only two singers to do so since 2010. A month after its release, the song achieved double platinum status, with over 100,000 downloads and streams. In April 2017, it got a third platinum record. By 17 May 2017, it was certified quadruple platinum, with over 200,000 downloads and streams. "Occidentali's Karma" was certified platinum for the fifth time on 7 August 2017 and surpassed the 150 million views two days later. As of February 2022, the song achieved over 263 millions views on YouTube and was a certified six-time platinum with more than 350,000 copies sold in Italy.

"Occidentali's Karma" frequently played on Italian radio, repeatedly topping the EarOne airplay chart. With 47,175 equivalent units in its first week and 2,472,000 weekly streams, "Occidentali's Karma" became the fastest-selling song in Italy and reached the highest number of weekly streams any song in the chart's history. The song remained at the top of the singles charts and radio airplay charts for weeks. Its international edition was ranked in the iTunes chart of 13 countries, and also appeared in the charts of 15 European countries, reflecting its appeal beyond Italy. On 28 April 2017, "Occidentali's Karma" was released as the lead single of his third album Magellano, which was positively reviewed. Magellano immediately topped the sales charts and was certified gold, and was also certified platinum on 16 October 2017. Subsequently, as a hit song for all seasons, "Occidentali's Karma" received a significant number of remixes, including from Benny Benassi and Gabry Ponte, and remained one of Eurovision's and Gabbani's most famous songs.

== Track listing ==
Digital download
No.	Title	Length
1.	"Occidentali's Karma"	3:37

7" single (limited edition coloured vinyl)
No.	Title	Length
1.	"Occidentali's Karma" (Original version)
2.	"Occidentali's Karma" (Instrumental version)

Remixes
No.	Title	Length
1.	"Occidentali's Karma" (Marc Benjamin & DNMKG Remix)	4:12
2.	"Occidentali's Karma" (Benny Benassi & MazZz Remix)	4:38
3.	"Occidentali's Karma" (Gabry Ponte Remix)	5:10
4.	"Occidentali's Karma" (Addal Remix Edit)	3:30
5.	"Occidentali's Karma" (DJ Ross & Savietto Remix)	4:17
6.	"Occidentali's Karma" (Molella & Valentini Remix Edit)	2:44
7.	"Occidentali's Karma" (Tyro Maniac Remix)	3:33
8.	"Occidentali's Karma" (Simon From Deep Divas Radio Remix)	3:37
9.	"Occidentali's Karma" (Ken Holland vs. Mess Remix Edit)	3:29
10.	"Occidentali's Karma" (Wlady Remix Radio Edit)	3:19
11.	"Occidentali's Karma" (DJ Konstantin Ozeroff & DJ Sky Remix)	3:56

== Charts ==
=== Weekly charts ===
Chart (2017)	Peak position
Austria (Ö3 Austria Top 40)	57
Belgium (Ultratip Bubbling Under Flanders)	4
Belgium (Ultratip Bubbling Under Wallonia)	35
Europe (Euro Digital Songs)	10
Finland Download (Latauslista)	17
France (SNEP)	110
Hungary (Single Top 40)	36
Iceland (RÚV)	8
Italy (FIMI)	1
Italy Airplay (EarOne)	1
Netherlands (Dutch Single Tip)	22
San Marino (RTV)	1
Spain (Promusicae)	14
Sweden (Sverigetopplistan)	87
Switzerland (Schweizer Hitparade)	25

=== Year-end charts ===
Chart (2017)	Position
Italy (FIMI)	6

== Certifications ==
Region	Certification	Certified units/sales
Italy (FIMI)	6× Platinum	300,000^{‡}
^{‡} Sales+streaming figures based on certification alone.

== Release history ==
Region	Date	Format	Label
Various	10 February 2017	Digital download	BMG Rights Management
