= San Moderanno =

Roman Catholic church in Berceto, Emilia-Romagna, Italy

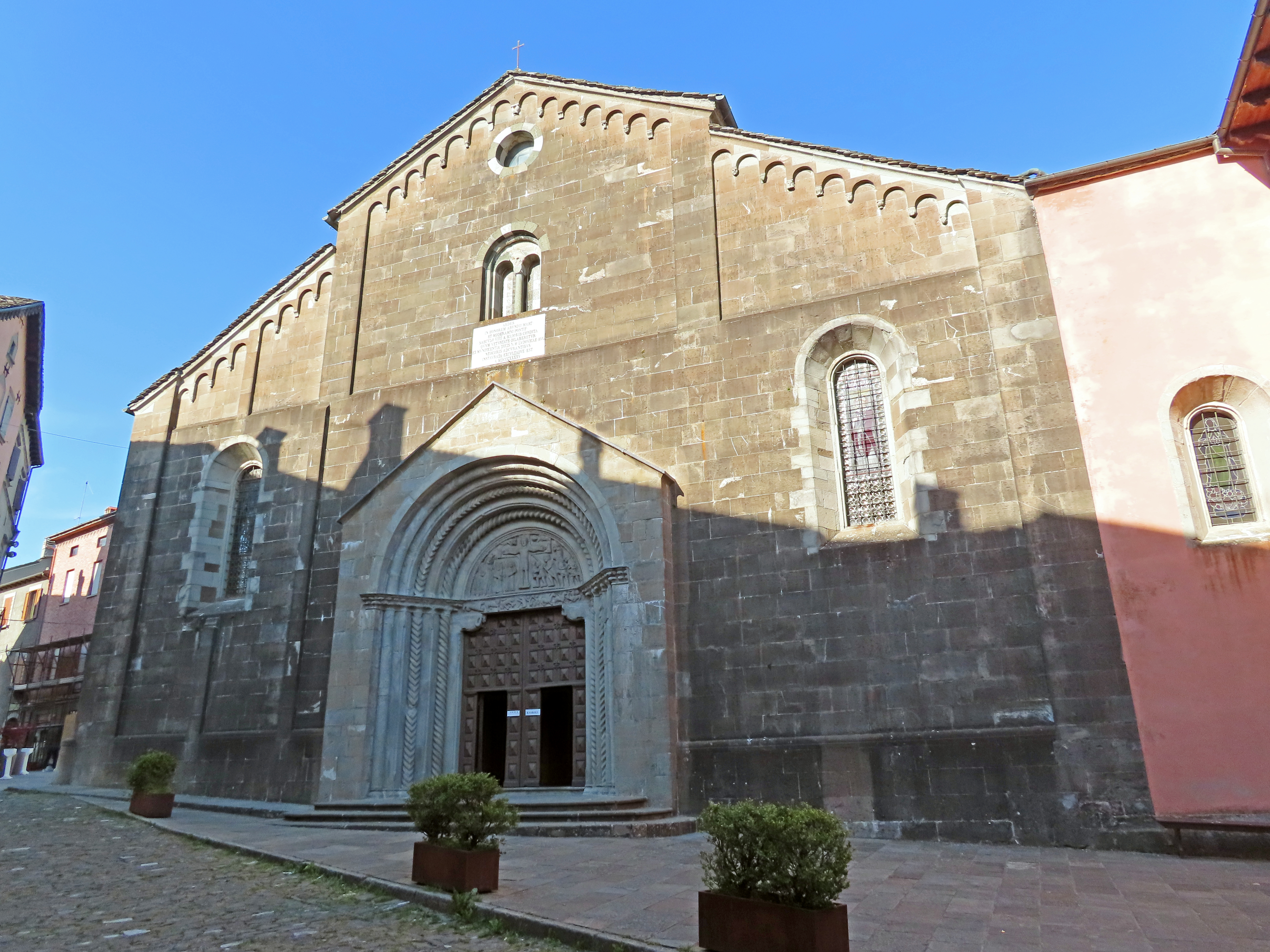
Façade

San Moderanno, also known as the Duomo of Berceto, is a Romanesque-style, Roman Catholic church, formerly attached to an abbey, located on Piazza Duomo in the town of Berceto in the region of Emilia-Romagna, Italy.

== History ==
The church arose alongside a Benedictine monastery founded in 719 by Liutprand, King of the Lombards. Originally attached to Bishop Moderanno of Renne, in 879, the monastery was assigned to the diocese of Parma, only to close in the following century, and the property being renamed a pieve, or rural parish, dedicated to San Moderanno. The convent was along the routes of pilgrimage to Rome.

The church was rebuilt in the 12th century, and the main portals date from this era. Further reconstructions were guided between 1480 and 1502, commissioned by Bertrando Maria Rossi. The facade was completed in Romanesque style in 1845.

The sculptural program of the portal documents events in the life and Passion of Christ, but is also peppered with images of animals and humans, symbolizing vices and sins. The secondary portal depicts the Adoration of the Magi (1198) and the figures of Saints Peter and Paul.
