= Viceversa (Francesco Gabbani album) =

Studio album by Francesco Gabbani
- Released: 14 February 2020
- Genre: Pop
- Length: 29:47
- Language: Italian
- Label: BMG
- Producer: Matteo Cantaluppi; Ivan Antonio Rossi; Filippo Gabbani; Francesco Gabbani; Luca Chiaravalli

Francesco Gabbani chronology
Magellano (2017)	Viceversa (2020)	Volevamo solo essere felici (2022)

Singles from Viceversa
- 1. "È un'altra cosa" Released: 10 May 2019; 2. "Viceversa" Released: 6 February 2020; 3. "Il sudore ci appiccica" Released: 5 June 2020; 4. "Einstein (E=mc²)" Released: 16 October 2020

Professional ratings
Review scores
Source	Rating
Rockol	3.5/5 stars

Viceversa is the fourth studio album by Italian singer-songwriter Francesco Gabbani. It was released on 14 February 2020 through BMG Rights Management. It was preceded by the singles "È un'altra cosa" and the title track "Viceversa", which was Gabbani's entry into the 70th edition of Italy's national Eurovision song selection competition, the Sanremo Music Festival 2020, where he placed second to Diodato's "Fai rumore".

== Background and writing ==
Gabbani stated that the album was written about what interested him after the success of "Occidentali's Karma". The album was called a "nine-track journey" that "leaves the listener free to decipher the lyrics and question their balance within society". Gabbani wrote the title track "Viceversa" about his girlfriend, Giulia, but said the track was intended as a song about "universal love", or love regardless of gender.

On 5 June 2020, Gabbani released "Il sudore ci appiccica" as a single. The song was sent to radios across Italy for airplay on that date, and many of those stations commemorated the track's release date as "Gabbani day".

On 16 October 2020, Gabbani released a remix to "Einstein" as a single, titled "Einstein (E=mc^{2})". The song, which references the mass–energy equivalence in its title, is a slowed-down piano version of the original track found on "Viceversa".

== Track listing ==
Viceversa track listing
No.	Title	Writer(s)	Producer(s)	Length
1.	"Einstein"	Francesco Gabbani; Filippo Gabbani; Luca Chiaravalli	Matteo Cantaluppi	2:56
2.	"Il sudore ci appiccica"	Francesco Gabbani; Filippo Gabbani; Chiaravalli; Pacifico	Cantaluppi	3:05
3.	"Viceversa"	Francesco Gabbani; Pacifico	Cantaluppi	3:35
4.	"Cinesi"	Francesco Gabbani	Ivan Antonio Rossi	3:47
5.	"Shambola"	Francesco Gabbani; Filippo Gabbani; Chiaravalli; Michel Petrucciani	Francesco Gabbani; Filippo Gabbani; Chiaravalli	3:06
6.	"Duemiladiciannove"	Francesco Gabbani; Filippo Gabbani; Chiaravalli	Francesco Gabbani; Cantaluppi	3:32
7.	"È un'altra cosa"	Francesco Gabbani; Filippo Gabbani; Chiaravalli; Fabio Ilacqua; Francesco Bianconi	Francesco Gabbani; Chiaravalli	3:18
8.	"Bomba pacifista"	Francesco Gabbani; Pacifico; Chiaravalli	Francesco Gabbani; Pacifico; Chiaravalli	3:25
9.	"Cancellami"	Francesco Gabbani	Rossi	3:03
Total length:				29:47

== Charts ==
=== Weekly charts ===
Weekly chart performance for Viceversa
Chart (2020)	Peak position
Italian Albums (FIMI)	2
Swiss Albums (Schweizer Hitparade)	97

=== Year-end charts ===
Year-end chart performance for Viceversa
Chart (2020)	Position
Italian Albums (FIMI)	41

== See also ==
- List of 2020 albums
