= Corchia =

Coordinates: 44°31′N 9°59′E

- Frazione
- Interactive map of Corchia
- Country: Italy
- Region: Emilia-Romagna
- Province: Parma
- Commune: Berceto
- Time zone: UTC+1 (CET)
  - Summer (DST): UTC+2 (CEST)
- Postal code: 43042

Corchia (pronounced [ˈkɔrkja]) is a village in northwest Italy. It is a frazione of the comune of Berceto in the Province of Parma, Emilia-Romagna. Set in the chestnut groves of Val Manubiola, Corchia is an example of a medieval borough of northern Italy. It is a settlement which maintains its medieval nucleus with stone houses, flag-stoned narrow lanes, and archways dating back to the 12th century.

== The Church ==
The church is dedicated to San Martino although it is no longer used for religious purposes; it presents an unusual façade with a bell tower held up by an archway that crosses over the street. A new church, financed by immigrants to America and France has been built on the village outskirts.

== Mining ==
Corchia's history is linked to mining: once all hope of finding gold (actually pyrite) in the valley was lost – a hope that was spurred in the mid-16th century under the Farnese family – industrial exploitation of the copper deposits started in 1865 and lasted until 1942: mine shafts may still be seen on the slopes of Mount Maggio.
