= Eternamente ora =

Studio album by Francesco Gabbani
- Released: 12 February 2016
- Recorded: 2015
- Genre: Pop; synth pop
- Label: BMG

Francesco Gabbani chronology
| Greitist Iz (2014) | Eternamente ora (2016) | Magellano (2017) |

Singles from Eternamente ora
- 1. "Amen" Released: 27 November 2015; 2. "Eternamente ora" Released: 6 May 2016; 3. "In equilibrio" Released: 12 September 2016

Eternamente ora is the second studio album by Italian singer-songwriter Francesco Gabbani. It was released in Italy through BMG Rights Management on the 12 February 2016. The album reached number 18 on the Italian Albums Chart. The album includes the singles "Amen", "Eternamente ora" and "In equilibrio".

== Singles ==
"Amen" was released as the lead single from the album on 27 November 2015. The song reached number 14 on the Italian Singles Chart. "Eternamente ora" was released as the second single from the album on 6 May 2016. "In equilibrio" was released as the third single from the album on 12 September 2016.

== Track listing ==
| No. | Title | Lyrics | Music | Length |
|---|---|---|---|---|
| 1. | "La strada" | Francesco Gabbani; Patrizio Simonini; Fabio Ilacqua | Filippo Gabbani; Francesco Gabbani; Francesco Lodovici; Davide Cipollini | 3:26 |
| 2. | "Amen" | Ilacqua | Francesco Gabbani | 3:16 |
| 3. | "Per una vita" | Ilacqua | Francesco Gabbani; Leonardo Rosi | 3:46 |
| 4. | "Software" | Francesco Gabbani; Ilacqua | Francesco Gabbani; Simonini | 3:55 |
| 5. | "Eternamente ora" | Ilacqua | Francesco Gabbani; Simonini | 3:20 |
| 6. | "In equilibrio" | Francesco Gabbani; Ilacqua | Filippo Gabbani; Francesco Gabbani; Simonini | 3:15 |
| 7. | "Prevedibili" | Francesco Gabbani; Ilacqua | Francesco Gabbani; Simonini | 3:01 |
| 8. | "Il vento si alzerà" | Francesco Gabbani | Francesco Gabbani; Simonini | 4:08 |

== Charts ==
=== Weekly charts ===
| Chart (2016) | Peak position |
|---|---|
| Italian Albums (FIMI) | 18 |

== Release history ==
| Region | Date | Format | Label |
|---|---|---|---|
| Italy | 12 February 2016 | Digital download | BMG |
