= Lozzola =

- Frazione
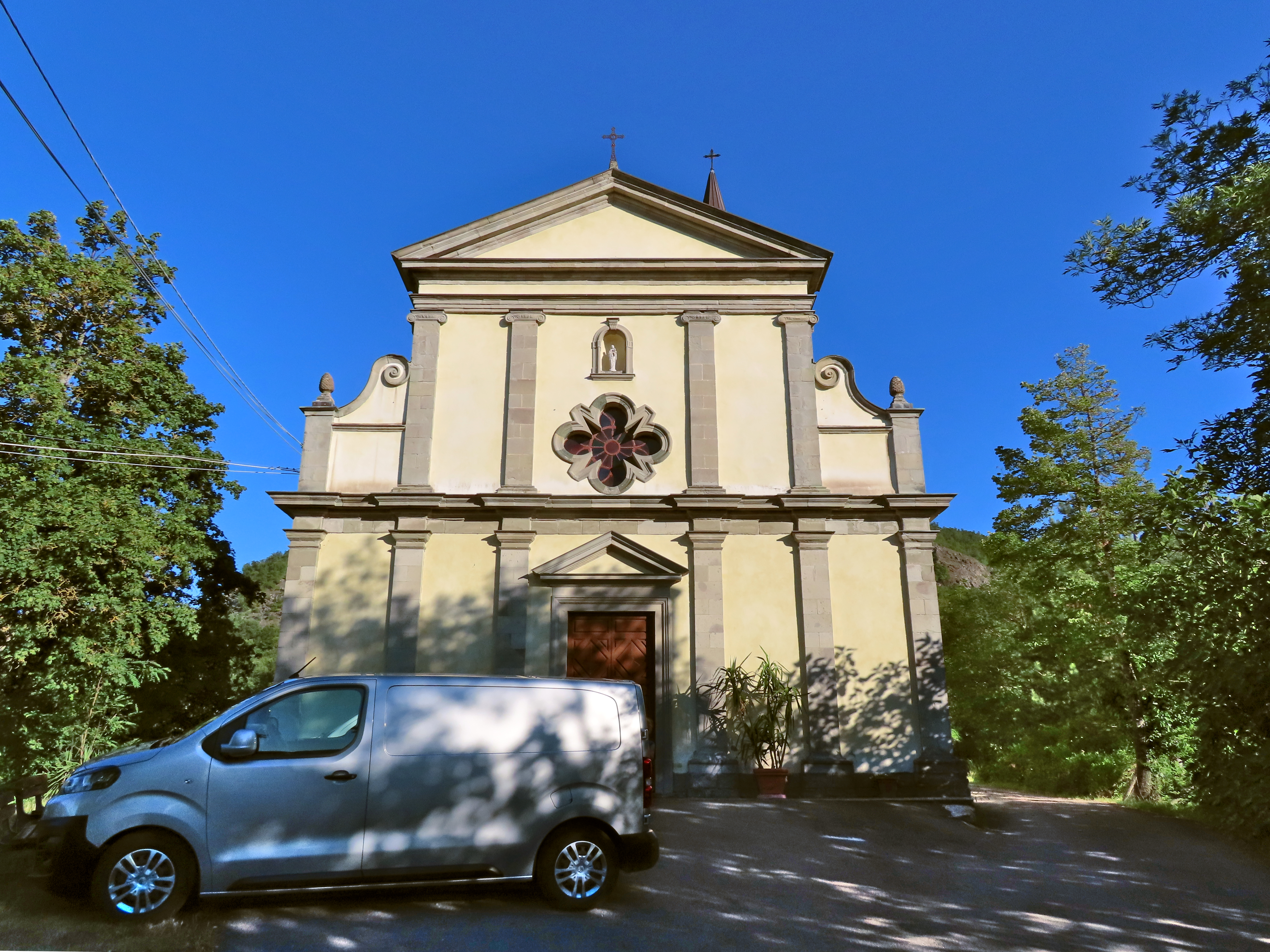

- Location in Italy
- Coordinates: 44.538°N 9.916°E
- Country: Italy
- Region: Emilia-Romagna
- Province: Parma
- Commune: Berceto
- Time zone: UTC+1 (CET)
  - Summer (DST): UTC+2 (CEST)

Lozzola is a frazione of the commune of Berceto in the Emilia-Romagna region of Italy.
