= Vise (disambiguation) =

A vise (also spelled vice) is a mechanical screw apparatus.

Vise, Visé or VISE may also refer to:

== Places ==
- Visé, Belgium

== People ==
People with the surname Vise:

- Brittany Vise (born 1987), retired American pair skater
- David A. Vise (21st century), American journalist
- Hollie Vise (born 1987), American gymnast
- Tiffany Vise (born 1986), American pair skater

== Other uses ==
- The Vise, an anthology mystery television series, aired 1954–1955
  - The Vise (1955 TV series), also The Vise: Mark Saber, a mystery drama television series
- Miami Vise, a defunct AFL team
- Venus In-Situ Explorer (VISE), a space probe

== See also ==
- Vice (disambiguation)
