= Rocca Sanvitale =

Rocca Sanvitale may refer to:

- Rocca Sanvitale, Fontanellato, a fortress residence in Fontanellato, northern Italy
- Rocca Sanvitale, Sala Baganza, a fortress/palatial residence in Sala Baganza, northern Italy

== See also ==
- Sanvitale (disambiguation)
