= Vicious =

Vicious may refer to:

== Music ==
- Vicious Vinyl, an Australian record label
- Johnny Vicious, American house DJ, producer and remixer
- Sid Vicious (1957–1979), punk rock musician
- Vicious (singer), Jamaican-American reggae artist active in the 1990s
- Vicious (Nasty Idols album), 1993
- Vicious (Halestorm album), 2018
- "Vicious" (Lou Reed song), 1973
- "Vicious" (Tate McRae song), 2020
- "Vicious" (Sabrina Carpenter song), 2022
- "Vicious", a song by Parkway Drive on the album Ire
- "Vicious", a song by Chantal Kreviazuk on the album Hard Sail

== Other uses ==
- Vicious, meaning "full of vice"
- To Make a Killing, a 1988 Australian film also known as Vicious
- Vicious (film), a 2025 American film
- Vicious (Cowboy Bebop), a Cowboy Bebop character
- Vicious (comics), a fictional DC Comics character
- Vicious (TV series), a British television sitcom
- Vicious (novel), a 2013 novel by V. E. Schwab
- Sid Vicious, stage name for professional wrestler Sid Eudy
- "Vicious" Verne Seibert, a professional wrestler from NWA All-Star Wrestling
- Vivian Harris (nickname "Vicious", born 1978), Guyanese professional boxer
- Vicious (play), American play about the life of Sid Vicious

== See also ==
- Vicious and Delicious, professional wrestling tag team
- Vicious Circle (disambiguation)
