= Greitist Iz =

Studio album by Francesco Gabbani
- Released: 27 May 2014
- Recorded: 2013
- Label: DIY Italia

Francesco Gabbani chronology
Greitist Iz (2014)	Eternamente ora (2016)

Singles from Greitist Iz
- 1. "I dischi non si suonano" Released: 9 June 2014; 2. "Clandestino" Released: 2014

Greitist Iz is the debut studio album by Italian singer-songwriter Francesco Gabbani, released in Italy through DIY Italia on the 27 May 2014. The album reached number 59 on the Italian Albums Chart. It includes the single "I dischi non si suonano".

The phrase Greitist Iz (pronounced [ˈɡreitist ˈits]), which has no meaning, is a pronunciation respelling of the English Greatest hits according to Italian orthography.

== Track listing ==
All lyrics are written by Francesco Gabbani, except where noted; all music is composed by Gabbani, except where noted

No.	Title	Length
1.	"Clandestino"	3:30
2.	"Come l'aria"	3:43
3.	"I dischi non si suonano"	3:37
4.	"Un sole"	3:46
5.	"Per tornare liberi"	3:18
6.	"Immenso"	3:20
7.	"Sto dicendo ciao"	4:58
8.	"Tarantola"	3:00
9.	"Isabel" (lyrics: Luca Danesi)	2:58
10.	"Le piccole cose"	3:11
11.	"Per una volta" (music: Gabbani, Leonardo Rosi)	3:39

== Charts ==
=== Weekly charts ===
Chart (2017)	Peak position
Italian Albums (FIMI)	59

== Release history ==
Region	Date	Format	Label
Italy	27 May 2014	Digital download	DIY Italia
Italy	20 January 2015	CD	DIY Italia
