= Federico Sanvitale =

Italian mathematician

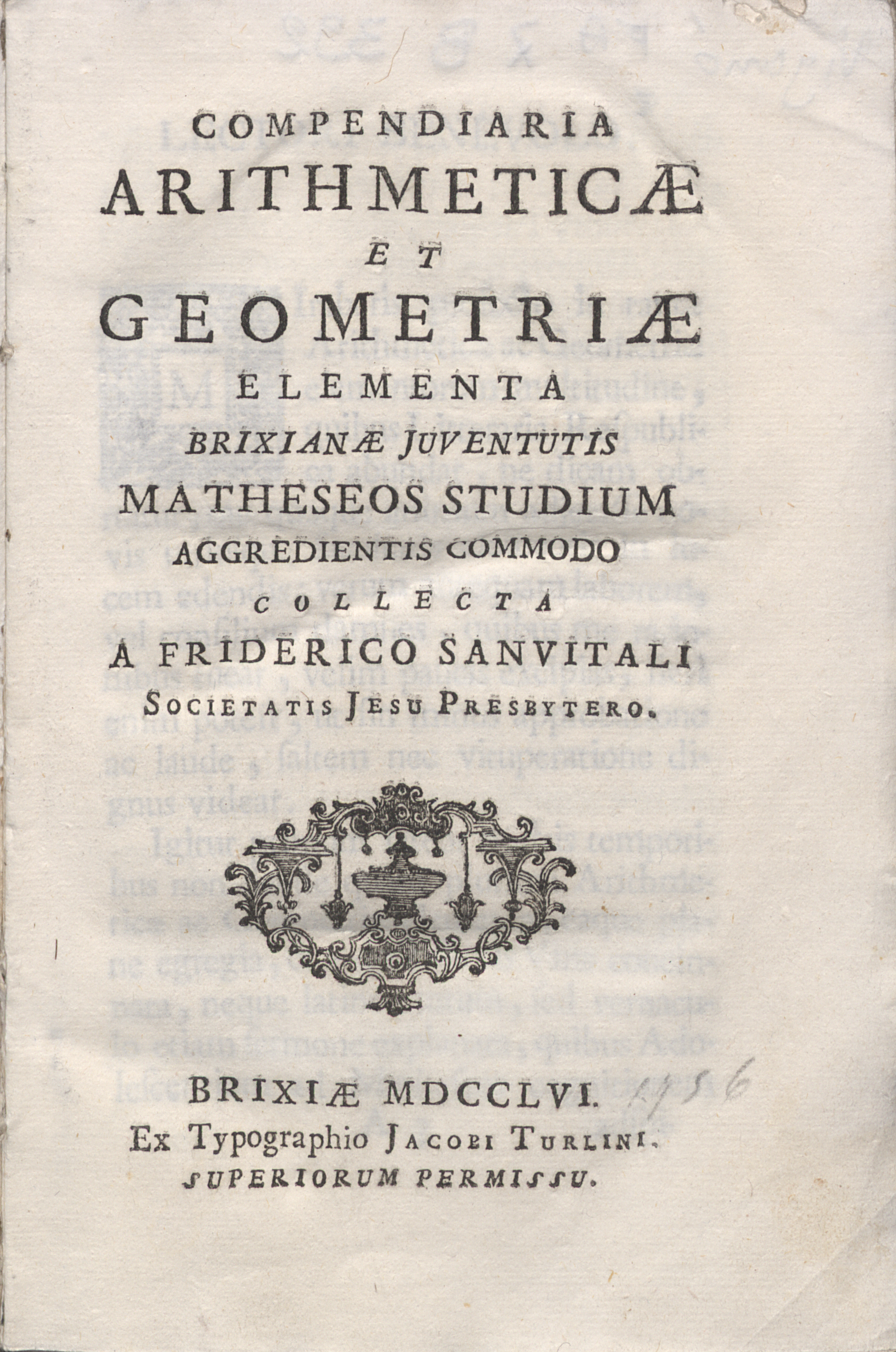
Compendiaria arithmeticae et geometriae elementa, 1756

Federico Sanvitale (Fontanellato, 19 May 1704 – Brescia, 8 December 1761) was an Italian mathematician and Jesuit that marked a pivot moment for the growth of Brescia's scientific culture.

== Works ==
- Orazione funebre per la morte di sua eminenza il signor cardinale Angelo Maria Querini (in Italian). Brescia: Giuseppe Pasini. 1755.
- Compendiaria arithmeticae et geometriae elementa (in Latin). Brescia: Giacomo Turlino. 1756.
- Elementi di architettura civile (in Italian). Brescia: Giammaria Rizzardi. 1765.
