= Pietramogolana =

Coordinates: 44.5905°N 9.9558°E

- Frazione
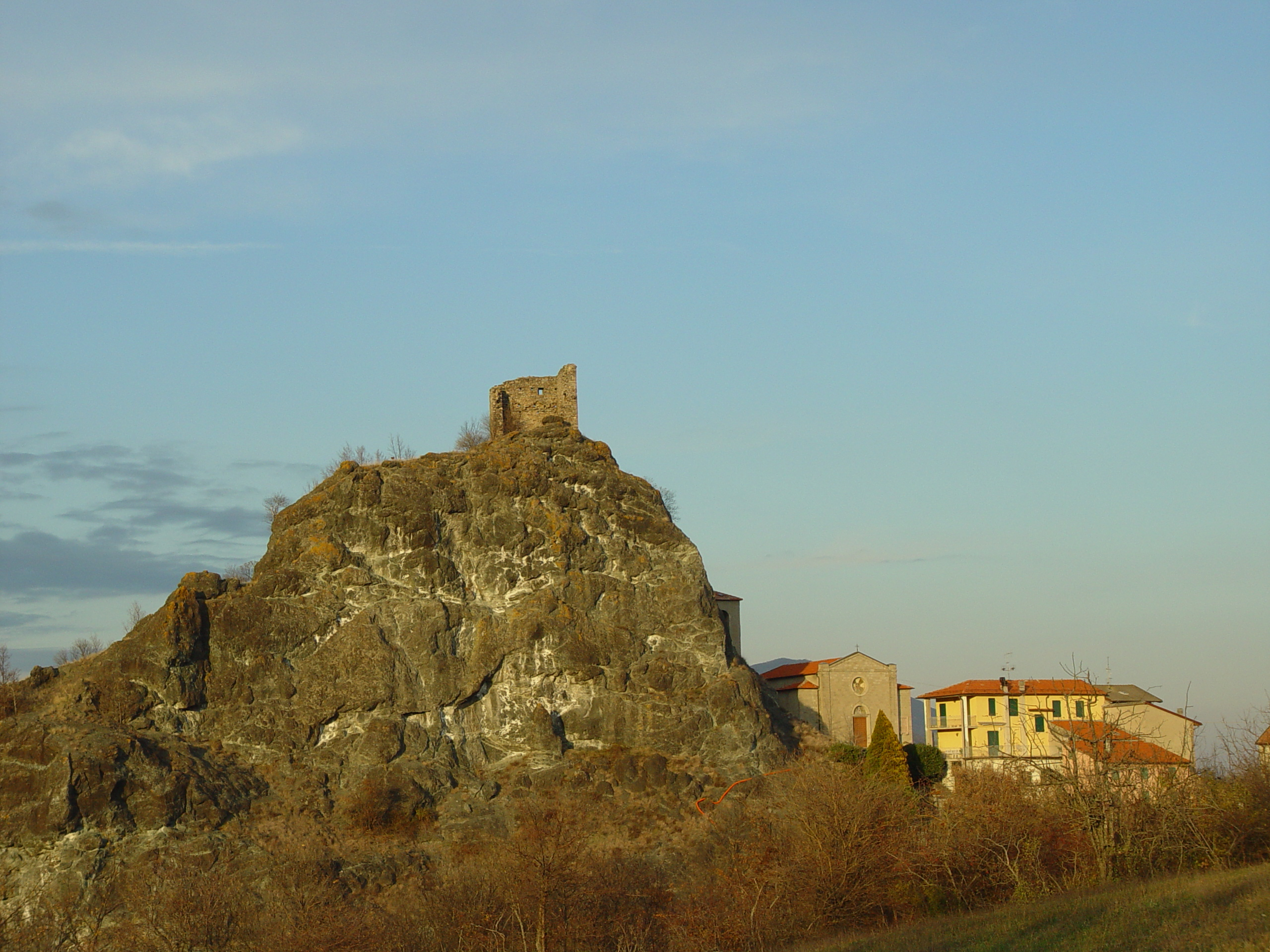
- Interactive map of Pietramogolana
- Country: Italy
- Region: Emilia-Romagna
- Province: Parma
- Commune: Berceto
- Time zone: UTC+1 (CET)
  - Summer (DST): UTC+2 (CEST)

Pietramogolana is a frazione of the commune of Berceto in the Emilia-Romagna region of Italy.

The hamlet was once named "Petra Mugulana", from the Latin Petra Mugiens, namely "roaring stone", referring to the roaring waters of the river Taro which runs by the base of the rocky outcrop upon which the hamlet is built.

== Physical Geography ==
The small Apennine village rises next to the ruins of a medieval castle, located on a rocky outcrop overlooking the river Taro, and is reached by a bridge which crosses the nearby Cisa Motorway.
