= Berceto =

- Comune
- Comune di Berceto
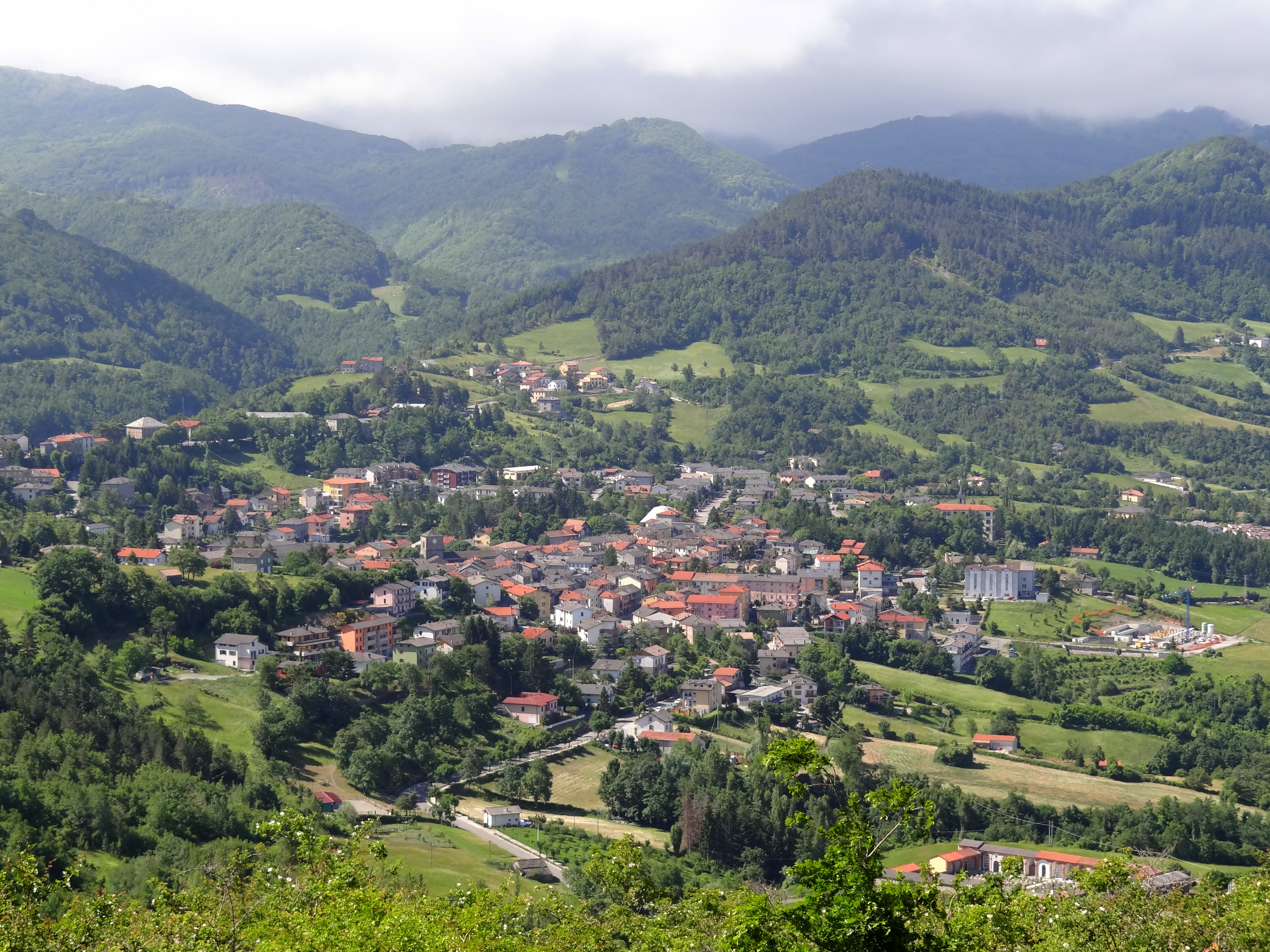
- Berceto seen from the north

- Coat of arms

- Location within Italy Location within Emilia-Romagna
- Coordinates: 44°30′35″N 9°59′20″E
- Country: Italy
- Region: Emilia-Romagna
- Province: Parma (PR)
- Frazioni: Bergotto, Boschi, Cantoniera Tugo, Casa Brusini, Casa Dolfi, Casaselvatica, Case Pesci, Castellonchio, Cavazzola, Corchia, Fugazzolo, Ghiare, La Costa, Lozzola, Pagazzano, Pian Farioli, Pietramogolana, Preda, Roccaprebalza, Tra La Riva, Valbona, Villa di Sotto.

Government
  - Mayor: Luigi Lucchi

Area
  - Total: 131 km^{2} (51 sq mi)
- Elevation: 852 m (2,795 ft)

Population (30 April 2017)
  - Total: 2,060
  - Density: 15.7/km^{2} (40.7/sq mi)
- Demonym: Bercetesi
- Time zone: UTC+1 (CET)
  - Summer (DST): UTC+2 (CEST)
- Postal code: 43042
- Dialing code: 0525
- Patron saint: San Moderanno
- Saint day: 22 October
- Website: Official website

Berceto (Parmigiano: Bersèjj, Barsäi or Bersè; Ligurian: Bercèi) is a village and comune in Italy, located in the Apennine Mountains on the main road between La Spezia and Parma, in the Taro River valley, in the region of Emilia-Romagna.

The main church in the comune is the Duomo of San Moderanno founded in the 9th century and with Lombard era sculptures. Other sights include the remains of the Castle of Berceto as well as those of Pietramogolana and Roccaprebalza. Berceto was the birthplace of condottiero Pier Maria II de' Rossi.
