= Madonna of the Stairs (Correggio) =

Fresco by Antonio da Correggio

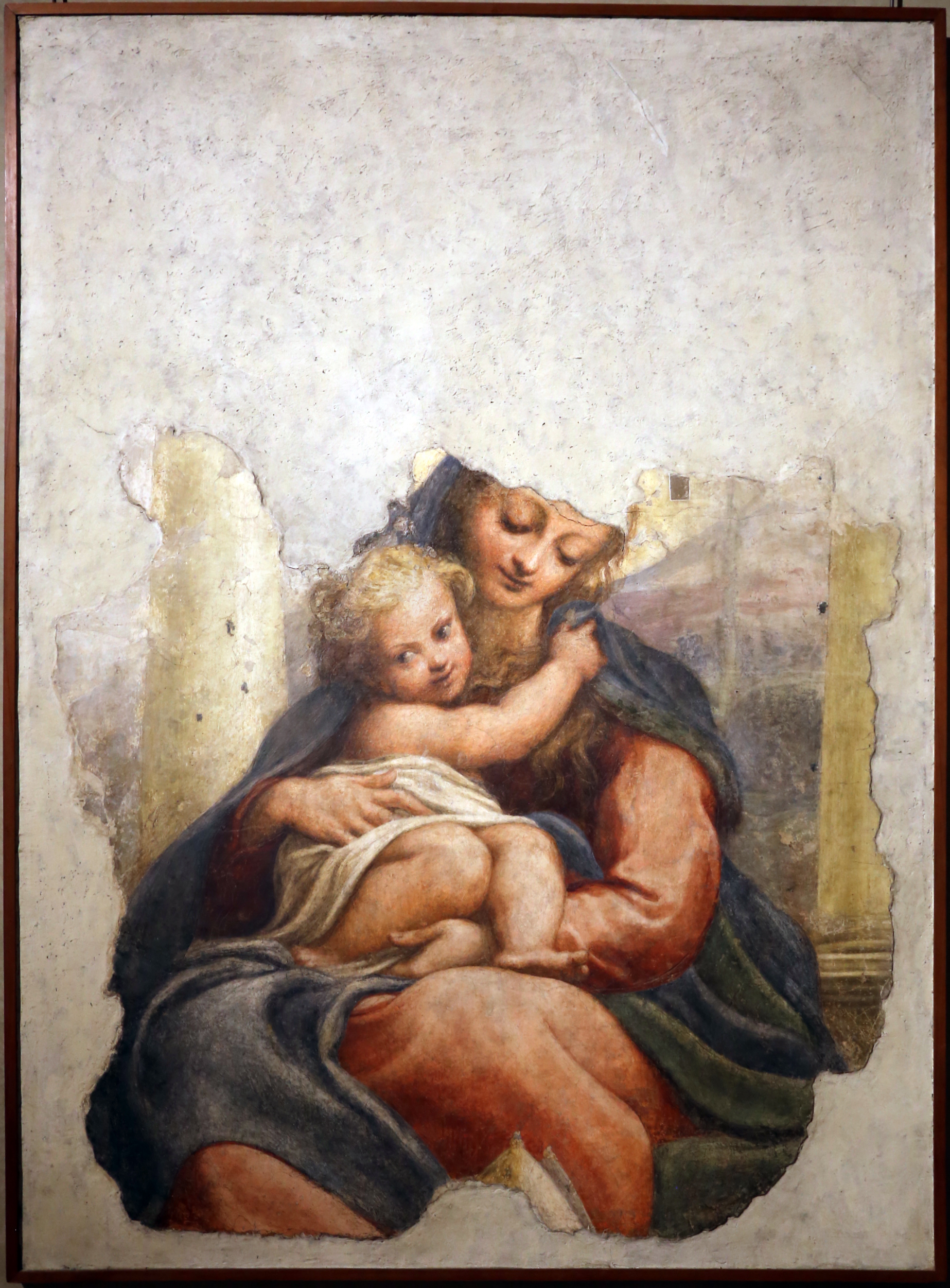

The Madonna of the Stairs (Madonna della Scala) is a fresco fragment (196 by 141 cm) by the Italian Renaissance artist Correggio, dating to c. 1522–1523 and now in the Galleria Nazionale di Parma.

== History ==
It was originally part of a fresco on the internal facade of the east gate of Parma, known as the San Michele gate and the start of the route to Reggio Emilia. It was seen there and praised by Vasari. When the walls were upgraded by Pope Paul III in 1555, the gatehouse was demolished and the fresco was detached from the wall and moved to the neighbouring oratory of Santa Maria della Scala, named since it could only be accessed by one staircase.

The Danish ambassador to Britain Jens Wolff visited the oratory in 1785 and mentioned "the absurd effect provoked by the zeal of some ignorant fanatic who in the church of Madonna della Scala nailed a silver crown onto the Virgin painted by Correggio and thus disfigured an incomparable work by an act of the grossest barbarity". Germaine de Staël, in her 1807 novel Corinne, also described the fresco as "perhaps the only painting which knows how to give to lowered eyes a raised and penetrating expression as if they were raised to heaven. The veil falling across her gaze takes nothing away from the feeling or thought, but makes them more enchanted; gives them a heavenly mystery. The painting has almost come off the wall and you can see the colour tremble as if a breath could make it fall".

When the oratory was demolished on 4 December 1812 the fresco was moved to its present home in the Galleria Nazionale di Parma. It was restored in 1948, removing it from its original support and transferring it to canvas. Another intervention in 1968 removed arbitrary additions to the work.
