= Portrait of Galeazzo Sanvitale =

Painting by Parmigianino

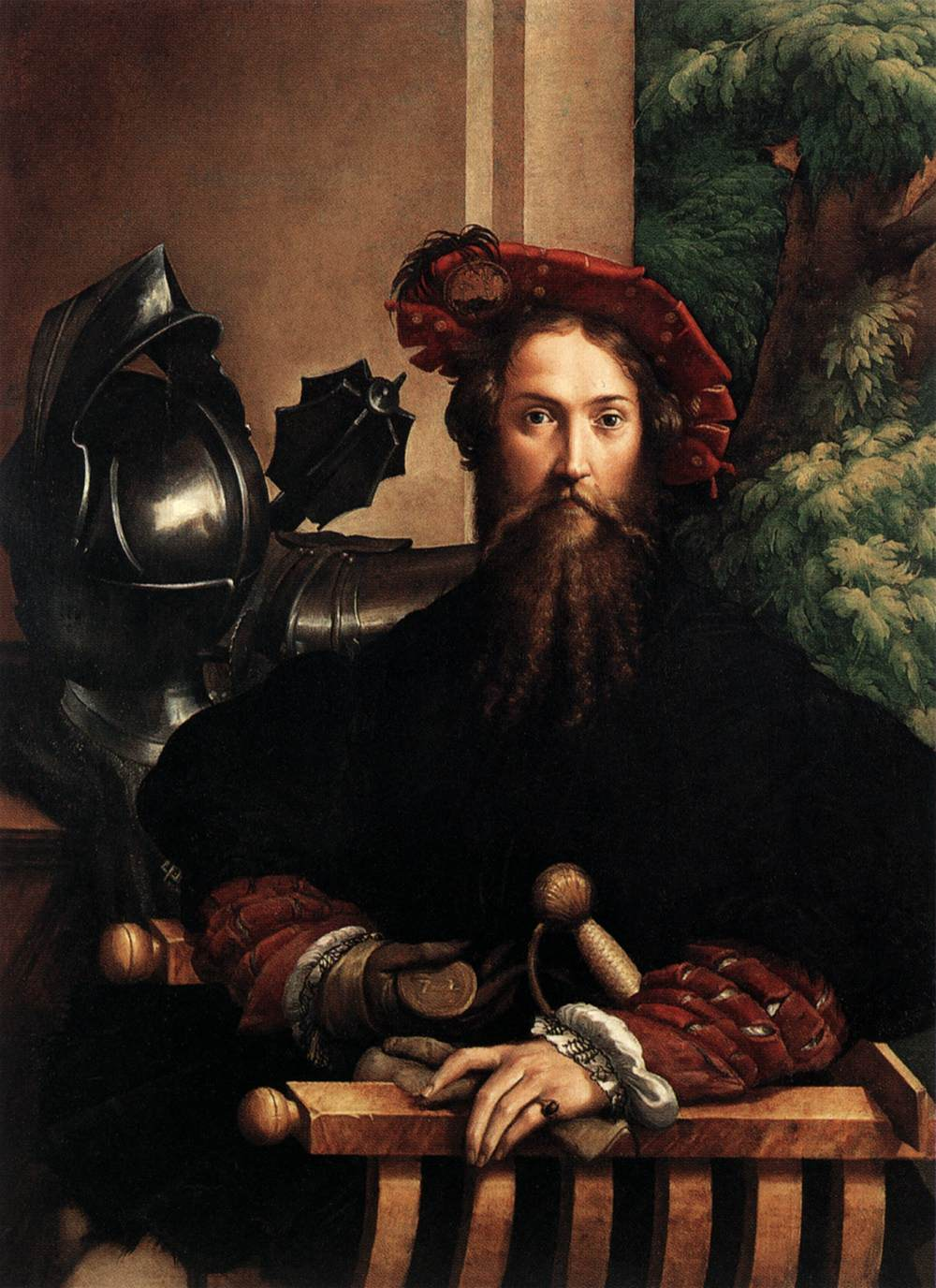
- Artist: Parmigianino
- Year: 1524
- Medium: Oil on canvas
- Dimensions: 109 cm × 81 cm (43 in × 32 in)
- Location: National Museum of Capodimonte; Naples

Portrait of Galeazzo Sanvitale (1524) is a painting of the condottiero Gian Galeazzo Sanvitale by the Italian late Renaissance artist Parmigianino. It is housed in the National Museum of Capodimonte, Naples, Italy.

== History ==
Parmigianino worked for a short period at the Sanvitale family court in their "Rocca" (palace-fortress) in Fontanellato (in what is now the province of Parma). The work, dated 1524 on the rear, was executed during his stay there, before he moved to Rome the following year. He also executed the Stufetta of Diana and Actaeon and a cycle of frescoes in the private room of Paola Gonzaga, wife of Gian Galeazzo Sanvitale. The work was part of the Farnese collections in 1587, when it is mentioned for the first time in an inventory. The work had been perhaps acquired by duke Ottavio Farnese in 1561 when he acquired from bishop Eucherio Sanvitale the casino (mansion) of Codiponte, in the Ducal Park of Parma. Eucherio was the son of Gian Galeazzo Sanvitale, and had inherited the family's possessions in 1550.

The portrait, together with the whole Farnese collection, was moved from Parma to Naples in 1784. The French removed it in 1799, and it was later at Palermo until 1816, before returning to Naples. During the various changes of hands the painting lost its original identification, and was considered a portrait of Christopher Columbus (likely due to the presence, in the hat, of a representation of the Pillars of Hercules) from Raphael's school. A descendant of Galeazzo Sanvitale, Luigi, recognized his ancestor based on some documents, in 1857. The re-attribution to Parmigianino occurred in 1894.

There are some preparatory drawings at the Cabinet des Dessins of the Louvre (6472 recto and verso) and in the Tobley Collection.

== Description ==
The work is a "parade portrait", destined to enhance the count's image in front of his guests, and not a private depiction: this is visible in the rich display of objects showing his interests and his refined costumes.

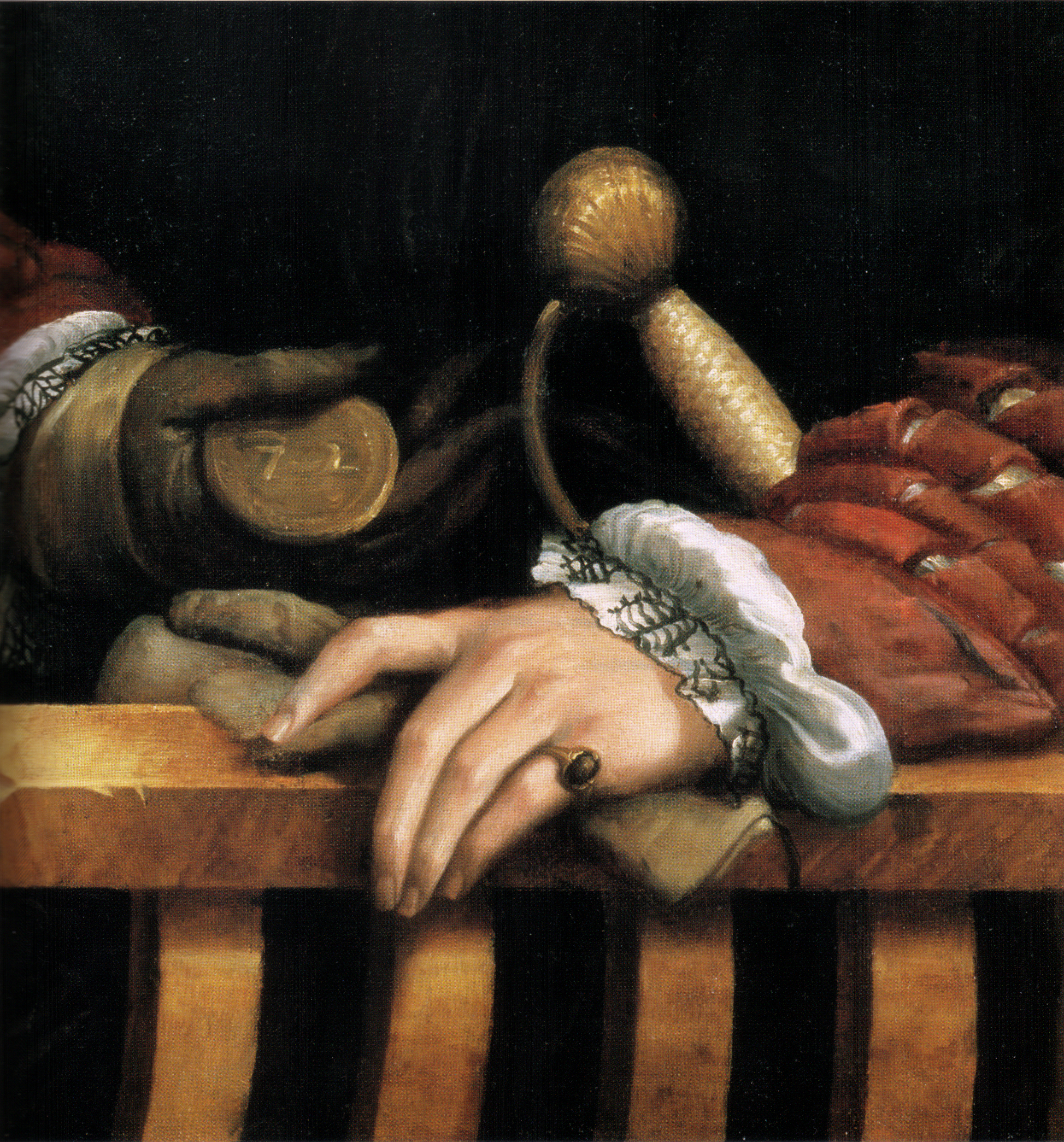
Foreground details.

The count, then 28, is portrayed on a "Savonarola" chair from three-quarters but with the face looking towards the viewer. He wears a wide black jacket, according to the contemporary alla Francese ("French-style") fashion, under which two red sleeves and the white shirt (with embroideries at the wrist) are visible. The elegant beret is in the same scarlet as the sleeves, and sports gilt pearls, a plum and a decorative cameo. The French style of the clothes is an allusion to the political allegiance of the Sanvitale at the time.

The left hand lies on the chair's armrest: it has a golden ring with a stone on the little finger, and holds a glove, near the sword's hilt. The other hand is wearing a glove, and shows a bronze medal with two symbols. These symbols have been interpreted as a "C" and an "F", hinting at the title of Comes Fontanellati ("Count of Fontanellato"), or as a "72" (based on earlier inventories). The meaning of the number is subject to several speculations. It has been connected to alchemy, an allusion to the Moon and Jupiter or to the conjunction of the Sun and Moon, referring in turn to the marriage of Galeazzo and his wife Paola Gonzaga. There is no historical record that Sanvitale practiced alchemy: although Parmigiano likely did, art historians have found no reason he should insert coded elements into a portrait.

On a table behind Sanvitale are pieces of a shining armor and a flanged mace, symbols of his military role as condottiero. Behind a wall, on the right, is a landscape with a tree.

== See also ==
- Portrait of Lorenzo Cybo

== Sources ==
- Viola, Luisa (2007). Parmigianino. Parma: Grafiche Step.
