= Gian Galeazzo Sanvitale =

Italian condottiero

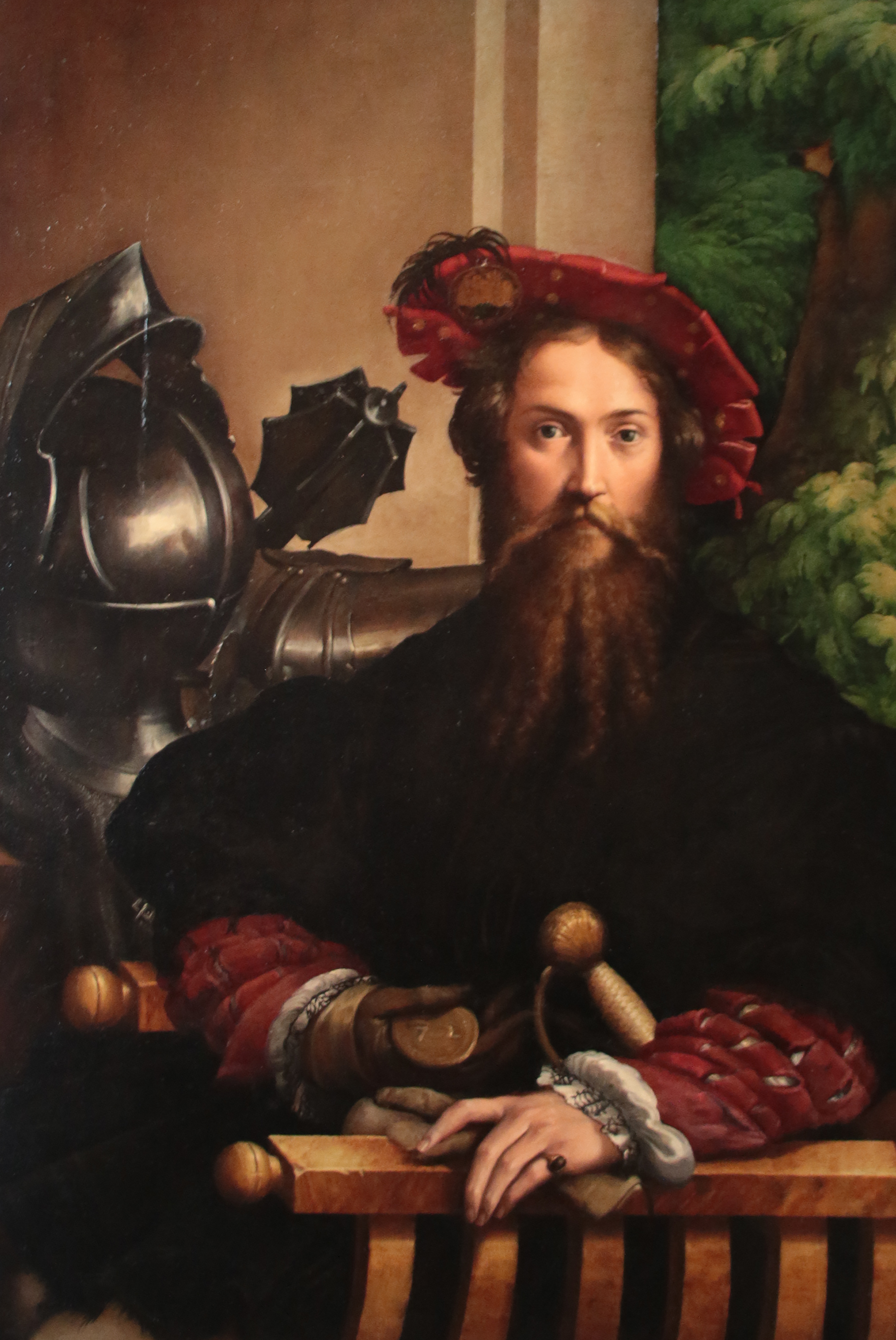
Sanvitale portrayed by Parmigianino, c. 1524.

Gian Galeazzo Sanvitale, also known as Galeazzo I Sanvitale (1496 – 2 December 1550) was an Italian condottiero, a member of the noble Sanvitale family.

== Biography ==
Gian Galeazzo Sanvitale was born at Fontanellato, near Parma, to Jacopo Antonio and Veronica da Correggio, a few months after the battle of Fornovo, in which his elder brother Gian Francesco had fought under the French army of Charles VIII. At the death of his father, in 1511, he inherited the fiefs of Fontanellato, Noceto, Belforte and Pietramogolana. The following year, his mother also died, and Gian Galeazzo was tutored first by Gian Francesco and then by Galeotto Lupi, husband of Ludovica Sanvitale.

During the Italian Wars, he remained faithful to the French. After the battle of Ravenna, in spite of being victorious, the latter had to abandon Emilia and Lombardy, and their local followers found themselves in a dangerous position. Parma was occupied by papal troops and Gian Francesco Sanvitale, perhaps forced to leave Fontanellato, asked his brother to submit to Pope Julius II. In December of the same year the property of the Rocca di Fontanellato was divided among them. Galeotto Lupi died in 1513, and Gian Galeazzo inherited his assets. In 1516 he married Paola Gonzaga, daughter of Ludovico Gonzaga marquess of Sabbioneta. The court of Fontanellato became subsequently an active cultural center, thanks to the patronage of Sanvitale himself, of his wife, his brother Gian Ludovico and, above all, Girolamo Sanvitale, count of Sala Baganza.

In 1522, Sanvitale was appointed as colonel of the King of France and helped his cousin Girolamo in the struggle against the Rossi of Parma. In 1525, after the French defeat in the Battle of Pavia, the Sanvitale suffered heavy attacks from the communal troops of Parma, but he remained loyal to Francis I of France, and later he received the French citizenship in reward.

In 1536, together with Girolamo Sanvitale, he was declared a rebel against the papal power. In 1539–1540, with the collaboration of the Pico and the French support, he attempted a coup in Cremona, but this was discovered and thwarted by the imperials. When, in 1545, Pier Luigi Farnese became lord of Parma, Sanvitale shared with him the philo-French stance. After the new duke was killed at Piacenza, he fortified Fontanellato and resisted the troops of Ferrante Gonzaga, Spanish governor of Milan, refusing to submit to emperor Charles V. He died near Parma at the beginning of the War of Parma.

== See also ==
- Portrait of Galeazzo Sanvitale

== Sources ==
- Lasagni, R. (1999). Dizionario biografico dei Parmigiani. Parma: PPS.
- Enciclopedia di Parma. Milan: Franco Maria Ricci. 1998. p. 611.
