= Viceversa (song) =

Single by Francesco Gabbani

from the album Viceversa
- Released: 6 February 2020
- Genre: Pop
- Length: 3:35
- Label: BMG Rights Management
- Songwriters: Francesco Gabbani; Pacifico

Francesco Gabbani singles chronology
"È un'altra cosa" (2019)	"Viceversa" (2020)	"Il sudore ci appiccica" (2020)

"Viceversa" is a song by Italian singer-songwriter Francesco Gabbani. The song was released as a digital download on 6 February 2020 by BMG Rights Management as the second single from his fourth studio album Viceversa (2020). The song peaked at number two on the Italian Singles Chart. The song was Gabbani's entry for the Sanremo Music Festival 2020, the 70th edition of Italy's musical festival which doubles also as a selection of the act for Eurovision Song Contest, where it placed second to Diodato's "Fai rumore".

== Music video ==
A music video for "Viceversa" was released on YouTube on 6 February 2020.

== Charts ==
=== Weekly charts ===
Chart (2020)	Peak position
Italy (FIMI)	2
Italy Airplay (EarOne )	5
Switzerland (Schweizer Hitparade)	55

=== Year-end charts ===
Chart (2020)	Position
Italy (FIMI)	37

== Certifications ==
Region	Certification	Certified units/sales
Italy (FIMI)	3× Platinum	300,000^{‡}
^{‡} Sales+streaming figures based on certification alone.

== Release history ==
Region	Date	Format	Label
Italy	6 February 2020	Digital download; streaming	BMG Rights Management
