= Fabio Ilacqua =

Italian composer and lyricist (born 1975)

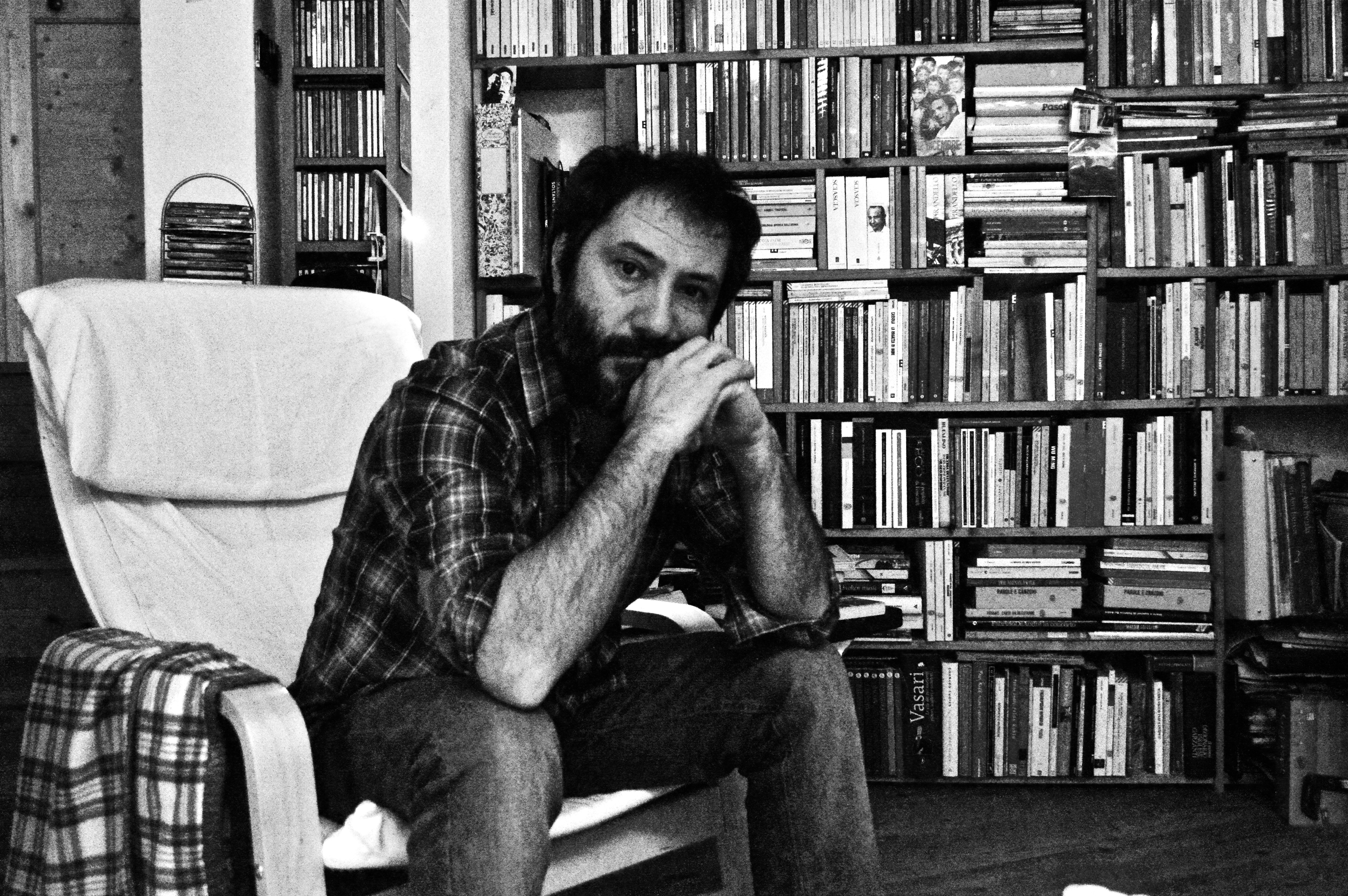
- Ilacqua in 2016
- Born: 8 October 1975 (age 50); Varese, Italy
- Occupations: Lyricist; Composer

Fabio Ilacqua (born 8 October 1975) is an Italian lyricist, composer, arranger, record producer and singer-songwriter.

== Life and career ==
Born in Varese to a Sicilian father and a Calabrian mother, Ilacqua studied at the Brera Academy in Milan. He started his professional career as singer-songwriter in 2007, winning the Musicultura Festival and releasing his only album Ballata del dopocena.

Ilacqua had his breakout thanks to the collaboration as a lyricist with Francesco Gabbani, with the songs "Amen" and "Occidentali's Karma" respectively winning the Sanremo Music Festival 2016 newcomers competition and the Sanremo Music Festival 2017 big artist competition. Artists with whom he collaborated include Mina and Adriano Celentano (for whom he penned "Ad un passo da te"), Massimo Ranieri (for whom he wrote "Lettera di là dal mare", which won the critics' award at the Sanremo Music Festival 2022), Ornella Vanoni Loredana Bertè, Paola Turci, and Marco Mengoni. In 2022, he produced and arranged the Francesco Guccini album Canzoni da intorto.
