= Francesco Gabbani =

Italian singer-songwriter and multi-instrumentalist (born 1982)

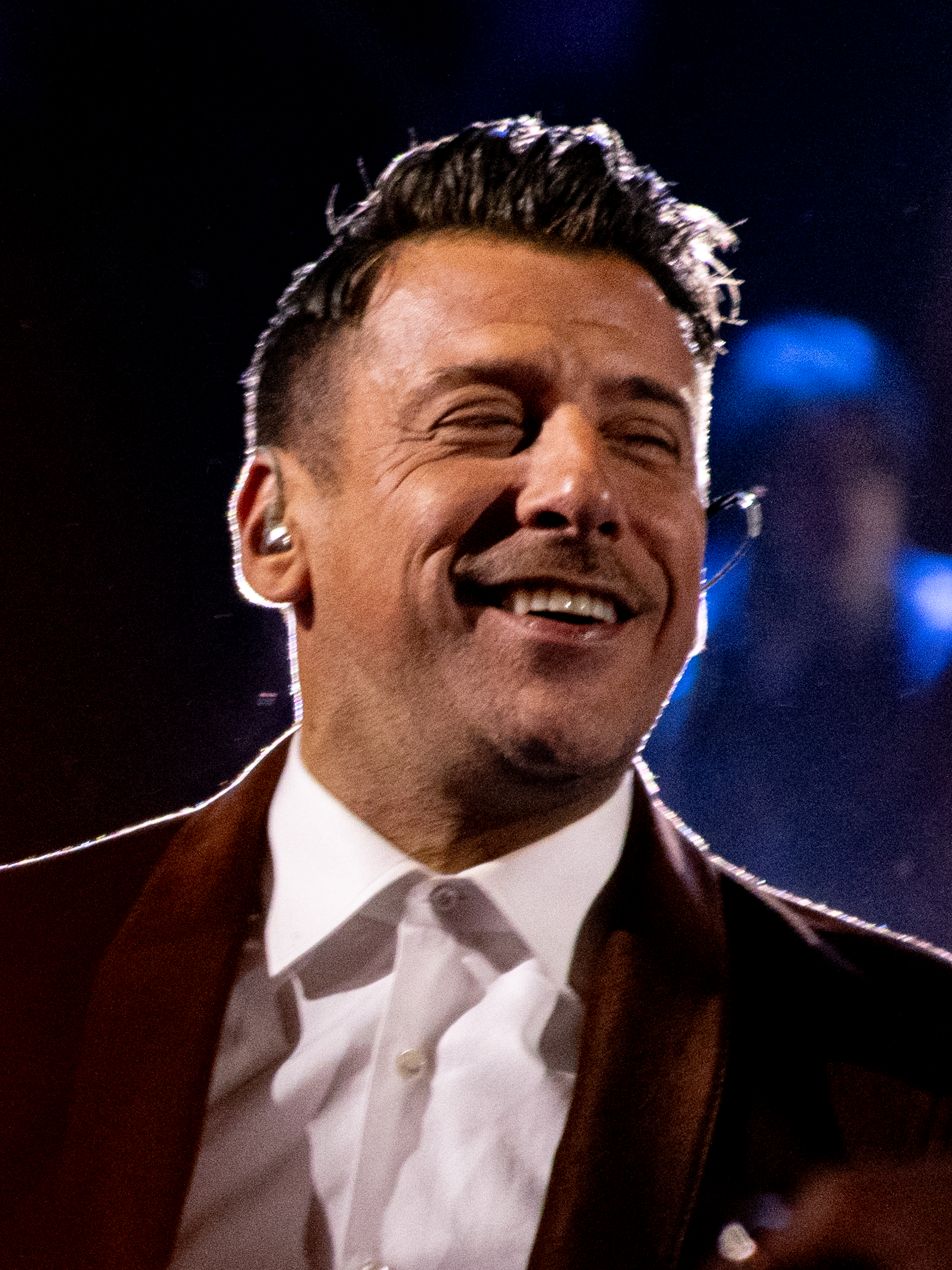
- Francesco Gabbani at 2026 Sanremo Music Festival

Background information
- Born: 9 September 1982 (age 43); Carrara, Italy
- Genres: Electropop; indie pop
- Occupations: Singer; songwriter; multi-instrumentalist
- Instruments: Vocals; guitar; piano; bass; drums
- Years active: 2000–present
- Label: BMG
- Website: francescogabbani.it

Francesco Gabbani (born 9 September 1982) is an Italian singer-songwriter and multi-instrumentalist. He won the newcomers' section of the Sanremo Music Festival 2016 with the song "Amen". The next year he won the main section of the Sanremo Music Festival 2017 with the song "Occidentali's Karma". He also represented Italy in the Eurovision Song Contest 2017, where he finished in 6th place.

== Life and career ==
=== 2009–2014: Early beginnings and Greitist Iz ===
In 2009, Gabbani featured on Mira Leon's single "Filodoro". He released his debut singles "Estate" and "Maledetto amore" in 2011. In 2013, Gabbani released "I dischi non-si suonano" and "Clandestino" as singles from his debut studio album. He released his debut album, Greitist Iz, on 27 May 2014. The album peaked at number 59 on the Italian Albums Chart.

=== 2015–2016: Eternamente ora ===
He was then signed to BMG Rights Management in 2015. The following year, he was announced as a competitor in the newcomers section of the Sanremo Music Festival 2016 with the song "Amen", which went on to win the competition. The song also won the Mia Martini Critics Award. The song was released as the lead single from his second studio album on 27 November 2015, and was certified platinum by the Federation of the Italian Music Industry. The song peaked at number 14 on the Italian Singles Chart. He released his second studio album Eternamente ora on 12 February 2016, peaking at number 18 on the Italian Albums Chart. On 6 May 2016, he released "Eternamente ora" as the second single from the album. "In equilibrio" was released as the third and final single from the album on 12 September 2016. In 2016, Gabbani composed the soundtrack of Italian comedy film Poveri ma ricchi, directed by Fausto Brizzi. The song "Foglie al gelo" was released in December 2016 as a single from the film's soundtrack album.

=== 2017–2018: Magellano and Eurovision Song Contest ===
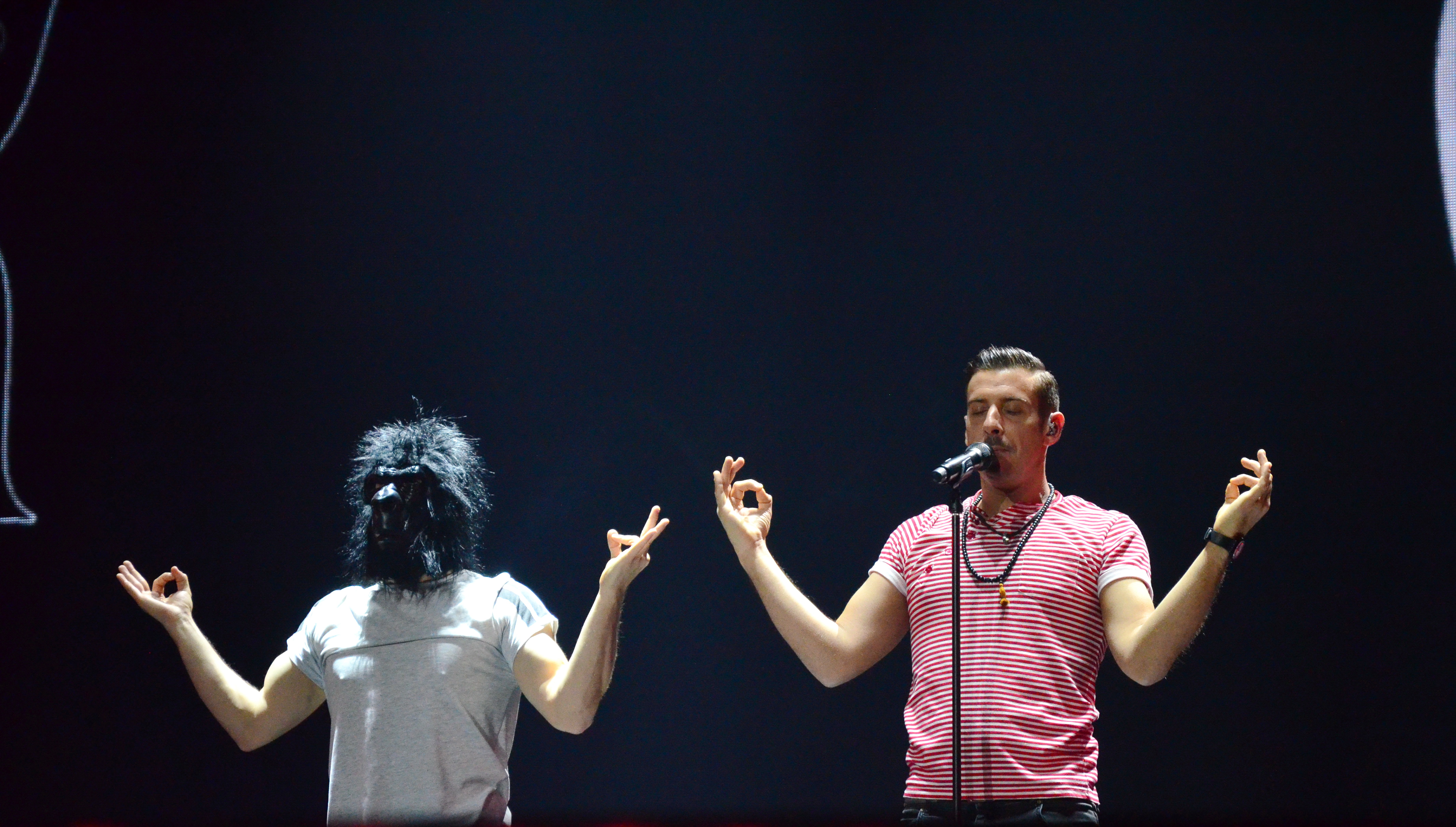
Eurovision Song Contest 2017

Gabbani returned to the Sanremo Music Festival the following year, winning in the "Big Artists" section with the song "Occidentali's Karma". As a result, he also became the first performer to win both sections of the Sanremo Music Festival in two consecutive years. After his win at Sanremo 2017, it was revealed by RAI that Gabbani had accepted the offer to represent Italy in the Eurovision Song Contest 2017, in Kyiv, Ukraine, with the song "Occidentali's Karma". As Italy is a member of the "Big Five", he automatically qualified to the final, held on 13 May 2017. Throughout the Eurovision season, he was considered a huge favourite to win the contest, however he only placed 6th with 334 points. In April 2017, Gabbani announced on Facebook that he would be releasing his third studio album, Magellano, on 28 April 2017. The album includes his Eurovision song "Occidentali's Karma". To promote the album, Gabbani embarked on a tour. He held several shows across Italy from 19 June to 9 September 2017. The album has peaked at number one on the Italian Albums Chart.

=== 2019–2020: Viceversa ===
On 4 May 2019, Gabbani released "È un'altra cosa", the first single from his fourth studio album, Viceversa. He participated at the Sanremo Music Festival 2020 with the song "Viceversa", where he placed second. The single reached number two on the Italian Singles Chart and was certified platinum by the Federation of the Italian Music Industry.

=== 2021–2023: Volevamo solo essere felici ===
On 3 September 2021, Gabbani released "La rete", serving as the lead single of his upcoming fifth studio album. In March of the following year, the album's title, Volevamo solo essere felici, was announced, and on 11 March, the title track was released as a single.

=== 2024–present: Sanremo Music Festival and X Factor judge ===
In December 2024, Gabbani was announced as one of the participants in the Sanremo Music Festival 2025. He placed 8th with the song "Viva la vita". In 2025, Gabbani became a mentor on the nineteenth season of X Factor Italy.

== Discography ==
- Greitist Iz (2014)
- Eternamente ora (2016)
- Magellano (2017)
- Viceversa (2020)
- Volevamo solo essere felici (2022)
- Dalla tua parte (2025)

== Awards and nominations ==
| Year | Award | Nomination | Work | Result |
|---|---|---|---|---|
| 2017 | MTV Italian Music Awards | Best Italian Male | Himself | Nominated |
| 2017 | MTV Europe Music Awards | Best Italian Act | Himself | Nominated |

Awards and achievements
| Preceded by Stadio with "Un giorno mi dirai" | Sanremo Music Festival winner 2017 | Succeeded by Ermal Meta & Fabrizio Moro with "Non mi avete fatto niente" |
| Preceded by Francesca Michielin with "No Degree of Separation" | Italy in the Eurovision Song Contest; 2017 | Succeeded by Ermal Meta & Fabrizio Moro with "Non mi avete fatto niente" |
