= Amen (Francesco Gabbani song) =

Single by Francesco Gabbani

from the album Eternamente ora
- Released: 27 November 2015
- Genre: Pop
- Length: 3:16
- Label: BMG; Warner Music Group
- Songwriters: Francesco Gabbani; Fabio Ilacqua

Francesco Gabbani singles chronology
"I dischi non si suonano" (2014)	"Amen" (2015)	"Eternamente ora" (2016)

"Amen" is a song by Italian singer/songwriter Francesco Gabbani. The song was released as a digital download on 27 November 2015 through BMG and Warner Music Group as the lead single from his second studio album Eternamente ora (2016). The song won the newcomers competition at the 66th edition of the Sanremo Music Festival, where it was also awarded the "Mia Martini" Critics' Award, the "Sergio Bardotti" Award for Best Lyrics, and the "Emanuele Luzzati" Award.

== Music video ==
A music video to accompany the release of "Amen" was first released onto YouTube on 1 December 2015 at a total length of three minutes and nineteen seconds. The video was shot at the Calacata Borghini mine in Carrara and directed by Daniele Barraco.

== Track listing ==
Digital download
No.	Title	Length
1.	"Amen"	3:16

== Charts ==
=== Weekly charts ===
Chart (2016)	Peak position
Italy (FIMI)	14

== Certifications ==
Region	Certification	Certified units/sales
Italy (FIMI)	Platinum	50,000^{‡}
^{‡} Sales+streaming figures based on certification alone.

== Release history ==
Region	Date	Format	Label
Italy	27 November 2015	Digital download	BMG; Warner Music Group
