= Marco Mengoni discography =

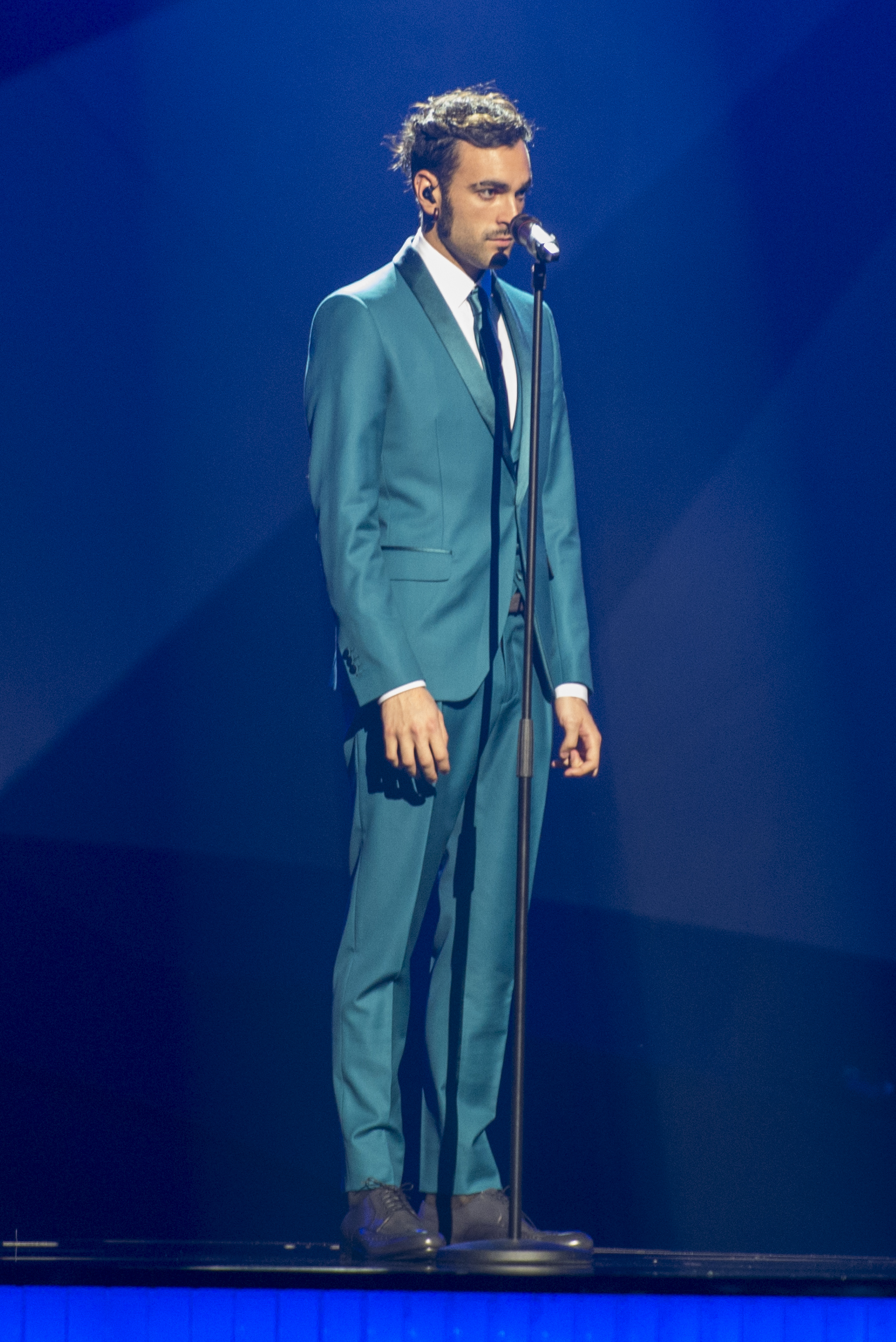
- Mengoni performing "L'essenziale" in the first dress rehearsal of the final of the Eurovision Song Contest 2013 in Malmö, Sweden.
- Studio albums: 8
- Extended plays: 6
- Live albums: 2
- Singles: 36
- Music videos: 35
- Promotional singles: 1

The discography of Italian recording artist Marco Mengoni consists of eight studio albums, two live albums, six extended plays, thirty-six singles, one promotional single, and thirty-five music videos. Mengoni reached commercial success in Italy when his first single, "Dove si vola", released after he won the third series of Italian talent show X Factor, debuted at number one on the FIMI Top Digital Downloads in December 2009. The EP with the same title entered the top 10 in Italy, and it was later certified platinum.

In 2010, Mengoni hit number one on the Italian albums chart with his second extended play, Re matto, and with the live album Re matto live. His first full-length studio set, Solo 2.0, was released in 2011, and it became his third consecutive number one. In 2013, Mengoni released the single "L'essenziale", which won the 63rd Sanremo Music Festival and represented Italy in the Eurovision Song Contest. The single topped the Italian Top Digital Downloads chart for eight consecutive weeks, and it became a minor hit in other European countries, including Switzerland, Spain and the Netherlands. Mengoni's second studio album, #prontoacorrere, was released in March 2013.

Starting from January 2015, Mengoni released a multi-albums project, including the studio sets Parole in circolo and Le cose che non ho, and the live recording Marco Mengoni Live (2016). The albums spawned several singles, including the Italian number-ones "Guerriero" and "Ti ho voluto bene veramente".

Mengoni's fifth studio album, Atlantico, was released in 2018 and featured the single "Hola (I Say)", a duet with Scottish singer Tom Walker.

In 2021, Mengoni started a trilogy, titled Materia. As of April 2023, two of the project's albums were released—Materia (Terra) and Materia (Pelle). The project included multi-platinum singles "Mi fiderò", featuring Madame's vocals, and "Ma stasera". In 2023, the song "Due vite", which became Mengoni's second Sanremo Music Festival winning entry, topped the charts in Italy and became his highest charting single in Switzerland, hitting number two in the Swiss Hitparade.

== Albums ==
=== Studio albums ===
List of albums, with chart positions and certifications
Title(s)	Details	Peak chart positions			Certifications
Title(s)	Details	ITA	SPA	SWI	Certifications
Solo 2.0	Released: 27 September 2011; Label: RCA Label Group; Formats: CD, digital download	1	—	—	FIMI: Gold
#prontoacorrere	Released: 19 March 2013; Label: Sony Music; Formats: CD, digital download	1	73	52	FIMI: 3× Platinum
Parole in circolo; Liberando palabras	Released: 13 January 2015; Label: Sony Music; Formats: CD, digital download	1	45	14	FIMI: 4× Platinum
Le cose che non ho	Released: 4 December 2015; Label: Sony Music; Formats: CD, digital download	1	—	8	FIMI: 4× Platinum
Atlantico; Atlántico	Released: 30 November 2018; Label: Sony Music; Formats: CD, digital download	1	25	20	FIMI: 4× Platinum
Materia (Terra)	Released: 3 December 2021; Label: Sony Music; Formats: CD, LP, digital download	2	—	32	FIMI: 7× Platinum
Materia (Pelle)	Released: 7 October 2022; Label: Sony Music; Formats: CD, LP, digital download	2^{[A]}	—	43	Sales certified with Materia (Terra)
Materia (Prisma)	Released: 26 May 2023; Label: Sony Music; Formats: CD, LP, digital download	1	—		Sales certified with Materia (Terra)
"—" denotes albums that did not chart or were not released.

=== Live albums ===
List of albums, with selected chart positions and certifications
Title(s)	Details	Peak chart positions		Certifications
Title(s)	Details	ITA	SWI	Certifications
Re matto live	Released: 19 October 2010; Label: Sony BMG; Formats: CD+DVD, download	1	—	Sales certified with Re matto
Marco Mengoni Live	Released: 25 November 2016; Label Sony BMG; Formats: 2× CD+DVD, download	1	22	FIMI: 2× Platinum
Atlantico Soundcheck	Released: 26 April 2019; Label: Sony Music; Formats: CD	—	—	
Atlantico / On Tour	Released: 25 October 2019; Label: Sony Music; Formats: 2× CD, download	—	—	
"—" denotes albums that did not chart or were not released.

== Extended plays ==
List of extended plays, with selected chart positions and certifications
Title	Details	Peak chart positions	Certifications
Title	Details	ITA	Certifications
Dove si vola	Released: 4 December 2009; Label: Sony BMG; Formats: CD, digital download	9^{[B]}	ITA: Platinum
Re matto	Released: 17 February 2010; Label: Sony BMG; Formats: CD, download	1^{[C]}	ITA: 3× Platinum
Dall'inferno	Released: 24 April 2012; Label: Sony BMG; Formats: CD, download	—	
Natale senza regali	Released: 1 December 2013; Label: Sony BMG; Formats: CD, download	—	
#prontoacorrerespain	Released: 10 June 2014; Label: Sony BMG; Formats: download	18^{[D]}	
Onde EP	Released: 16 June 2017; Label: Sony BMG; Formats: download	—	
"—" denotes EPs that did not chart or were not released.

== Singles ==
=== As lead artist ===
List of singles, with chart positions and certifications, showing year released and album name
Title	Year	Peak chart positions										Certifications	Album or EP
Title	Year	ITA	AUT	BEL (FL)	BEL (WA)	GER	LTU	NL	SPA	SWI	WW	Certifications	Album or EP
"Dove si vola"	2009	1	—	—	—	—	—	—	—	—	—		Dove si vola
"Credimi ancora"	2010	3	—	—	—	—	—	—	—	—	—	FIMI: Platinum	Re matto
"Stanco (Deeper Inside)"	2010	—	—	—	—	—	—	—	—	—	—		Re matto
"In un giorno qualunque"	2010	5	—	—	—	—	—	—	—	—	—	FIMI: Platinum	Re matto live
"Solo (Vuelta al ruedo)"	2011	4	—	—	—	—	—	—	—	—	—		Solo 2.0
"Tanto il resto cambia"	2011	66	—	—	—	—	—	—	—	—	—		Solo 2.0
"Dall'inferno"	2012	40	—	—	—	—	—	—	—	—	—		Solo 2.0
"L'essenziale"^{[B]}^{[C]}	2013	1	60	81	77	79	—	69	43	36	—	FIMI: 4× Platinum	#prontoacorrere
"Pronto a correre"	2013	7	—	—	—	—	—	—	—	—	—	FIMI: Platinum	#prontoacorrere
"Non passerai"	2013	10	—	—	—	—	—	—	—	—	—	FIMI: Platinum	#prontoacorrere
"Non me ne accorgo"	2013	16	—	—	—	—	—	—	—	—	—		#prontoacorrere
"Incomparable"	2014	14	—	—	—	—	—	—	—	—	—		#prontoacorrerespain
"La valle dei re"	2014	—	—	—	—	—	—	—	—	—	—		#prontoacorrere
"Guerriero"	2014	1	—	—	—	—	—	—	—	—	—	FIMI: 6× Platinum	Parole in circolo
"Esseri umani"	2015	16	—	—	—	—	—	—	—	—	—	FIMI: 2× Platinum	Parole in circolo
"Io ti aspetto"	2015	13	—	—	—	—	—	—	—	—	—	FIMI: 2× Platinum	Parole in circolo
"Ti ho voluto bene veramente"	2015	1	—	—	—	—	—	—	—	61	—	FIMI: 5× Platinum	Le cose che non ho
"Parole in circolo"	2016	34	—	—	—	—	—	—	—	—	—	FIMI: 2× Platinum	Le cose che non ho
"Solo due satelliti"	2016	79	—	—	—	—	—	—	—	—	—	FIMI: Platinum	Le cose che non ho
"Sai che"	2016	3	—	—	—	—	—	—	—	—	—	FIMI: 2× Platinum	Marco Mengoni Live
"Ricorderai l'amore (Remember the Love)" (featuring Grace Capristo)	2016	—	—	—	—	—	—	—	—	—	—		Parole in circolo – Special Edition
"Onde"	2017	38	—	—	—	—	—	—	—	—	—	FIMI: Platinum	Onde EP
"Come neve" (with Giorgia)	2017	3	—	—	—	—	—	—	—	76	—	FIMI: 2× Platinum	Oronero Live
"Voglio"	2018	4	—	—	—	—	—	—	—	—	—	FIMI: Gold	Atlantico
"Buona vita"	2018	8	—	—	—	—	—	—	—	—	—		Atlantico
"Hola"; "Hola (I Say)"; (solo or featuring Tom Walker)	2018	4	—	—	—	—	—	—	—	—	—	FIMI: 3× Platinum	Atlantico
"Muhammad Ali"	2019	39	—	—	—	—	—	—	—	—	—	FIMI: Platinum	Atlantico
"Duemila volte"	2019	10	—	—	—	—	—	—	—	—	—	FIMI: Platinum	Atlantico On Tour
"Venere e Marte" (with Takagi & Ketra and Frah Quintale)	2021	2	—	—	—	—	—	—	—	—	—	FIMI: 2× Platinum	Non-album single
"Ma stasera"	2021	17	—	—	—	—	—	—	—	—	—	FIMI: 3× Platinum	Materia (Terra)
"Cambia un uomo"	2021	35	—	—	—	—	—	—	—	—	—	FIMI: Platinum	Materia (Terra)
"Mi fiderò" (featuring Madame)	2021	12	—	—	—	—	—	—	—	—	—	FIMI: 4× Platinum	Materia (Terra)
"No Stress"	2022	40	—	—	—	—	—	—	—	—	—	FIMI: Platinum	Materia (Pelle)
"Tutti i miei ricordi"	2022	72	—	—	—	—	—	—	—	—	—	FIMI: Gold	Materia (Pelle)
"Due vite"	2023	1	50	—	—	—	14	— (Note: "Due vite" did not enter the Dutch Single Top 100, but peaked at number 29 on the Single Tip chart.)	—	2	80	FIMI: 6× Platinum; IFPI SWI: Gold	Materia (Prisma)
"Pazza musica" (with Elodie)	2023	10	—	—	—	—	—	—	—	—	—	FIMI: 3× Platinum	Materia (Prisma)
"Un'altra storia" (featuring Franco126)	2023	34	—	—	—	—	—	—	—	—	—	FIMI: Platinum	Materia (Prisma)
"La Dernière Chanson"	2023	—	—	—	—	—	—	—	—	—	—		Non-album singles
"Mandare tutto all'aria"	2024	31	—	—	—	—	—	—	—	—	—		Non-album singles
"Sto bene al mare" (featuring Sayf and Rkomi)	2025	21	—	—	—	—	—	—	—	—	—	FIMI: Gold	Non-album singles
"Coming Home"	2025	7	—	—	—	—	—	—	—	—	—		Non-album singles
"Giornate perse"	2026	33	—	—	—	—	—	—	—	—	—		Non-album singles
"—" denotes singles that did not chart or were not released.

=== As featured artist ===
List of singles as featured artist, with selected chart positions, showing year released and album name
Title	Year	Peak chart positions	Certifications	Album
Title	Year	ITA	Certifications	Album
"Fuoco di paglia" (Mace featuring Marco Mengoni, Frah Quintale and Gemitaiz)	2024	29	FIMI: Gold	Māyā
"Oggi sono io" (Alex Britti featuring Marco Mengoni)	2025	―		Non-album single
"Piazza San Marco" (Annalisa featuring Marco Mengoni)	2025	10	FIMI: Gold	Ma io sono fuoco
"Canto d'amore" (Angelina Mango featuring Marco Mengoni)	2026	8	FIMI: Gold	Caramé

== Promotional singles ==
List of promotional singles, with chart positions and certifications, showing year released and album name
Title	Year	Peak chart positions	Album or EP
Title	Year	ITA	Album or EP
"Bellissimo"	2013	17	#prontoacorrere

== Other charted and certified songs ==
List of charted songs, with positions, showing year released and album name
Title	Year	Peak chart positions	Certifications	Album or EP
Title	Year	ITA	Certifications	Album or EP
"Insieme a te sto bene"	2009	34		X Factor performances
"Almeno tu nell'universo	2009	22		X Factor performances
"Billie Jean"	2009	49		X Factor performances
"Il nostro concerto"	2009	28		X Factor performances
"Kiss"	2009	30		X Factor performances
"Back in Black"	2009	22		X Factor performances
"Senza fine"	2009	28		X Factor performances
"My Baby Just Cares for Me"	2009	48		X Factor performances
"Man in the Mirror"	2009	28		Dove si vola
"L'amore si odia"	2009	46		Dove si vola
"Psycho Killer"	2009	18		Dove si vola
"White Christmas"	2009	13		X Factor - The Christmas Album
"All I Want for Christmas Is You" (The X-Factor 2009 finalists)	2009	19		X Factor - The Christmas Album
"Un gioco sporco"	2011	100		Solo 2.0
"Scrivi qualcosa per me"	2012	38		Il senso... di Alex
"Se sei come me"	2015	25		Parole in circolo
"Invincibile"	2015	37		Parole in circolo
"La neve prima che cada"	2015	69		Parole in circolo
"Mai e per sempre"	2015	79		Parole in circolo
"Come un attimo fa"	2015	87		Parole in circolo
"Ed è per questo"	2015	90		Parole in circolo
"Se io fossi te"	2015	94		Parole in circolo
"Ad occhi chiusi"	2015	41	FIMI: Platinum	Le cose che non ho
"Ricorderai l'amore"	2015	45		Le cose che non ho
"Le cose che non ho"	2015	65		Le cose che non ho
"Resti indifferente"	2015	75		Le cose che non ho
"Il meno possibile" (featuring Gazzelle)	2021	—	FIMI: Gold	Materia (Terra)
"Tutti hanno paura" (Ernia featuring Marco Mengoni)	2022	16		Io non ho paura
"Uguale a me" (Angelina Mango featuring Marco Mengoni)	2024	50		Poké melodrama

== Other appearances ==
List of other album appearances
Title	Year	Album
"White Christmas"	2009	X Factor - The Christmas Album by Various Artists
"All I Want for Christmas Is You" (The X-Factor 2009 finalists)	2009	X Factor - The Christmas Album by Various Artists
"Per non essere così"	2011	Sei Zero by Renato Zero
"Meri Luis" (Lucio Dalla featuring Marco Mengoni)	2011	Questo è amore by Lucio Dalla
"Scrivi qualcosa per me"	2012	Il senso... di Alex by Various Artists
"Destra - sinistra"	2012	...Io ci sono by Various Artists
"Comunque auguri" (Indy Stinty featuring J-Ax and Marco Mengoni)	2014	Natale a casa Deejay
"Al centro della musica" (Ron featuring Marco Mengoni)	2016	La forza di dire sì
"Il pescatore di asterischi" (Live) (Samuele Bersani featuring Marco Mengoni)	2016	La fortuna che abbiamo
"All'altare" (Boosta featuring Marco Mengoni)	2016	La stanza intelligente
"Cosas que no quise decirte" (Funambulista featuring Marco Mengoni)	2017	Dual
"Cosas que no quise decirte" (Live) (Funambulista featuring Marco Mengoni)	2018	La noche del botánico (En directo)
"L'amore è nell'aria stasera" (Marco Mengoni, Elisa, Edoardo Leo and Stefano Fresi)	2019	Il Re Leone (Colonna sonora originale) (Italian version of The Lion King)
"Hakuna Matata" Edoardo Leo, Stefano Fresi, Simone Iuè and Marco Mengoni)	2019	Il Re Leone (Colonna sonora originale) (Italian version of The Lion King)
"Tutti hanno paura" (Ernia featuring Marco Mengoni)	2022	Io non ho paura
"Uguale a me" (Angelina Mango featuring Marco Mengoni)	2024	Poké melodrama

== Music videos ==
List of music videos, showing year released and director
Title	Year	Director(s)
"Credimi ancora"	2010	Gaetano Morbioli
"Stanco (Deeper Inside)"	2010	Gaetano Morbioli
"In un giorno qualunque"	2010	Francesco Fei
"Solo (Vuelta al ruedo)"	2011	Gianluca "Calu" Montesano
"Tanto il resto cambia"	2011	Sak
"Dall'inferno"	2012	Gianluca "Calu" Montesano
"L'essenziale"	2013	Giuseppe La Spada
"Pronto a correre"	2013	Gaetano Morbioli
"Non passerai"	2013	Gaetano Morbioli
"Non me ne accorgo"	2013	Christian Biondani
"Incomparable"	2014	—N/a
"La valle dei re"	2014	Gaetano Morbioli
"Guerriero"	2014	Marco Mengoni, Cosimo Alemà
"Esseri umani"	2015	Cosimo Alemà
"Invincibile"	2015	—N/a
"Io ti aspetto"	2015	Luca Finotti
"Ti ho voluto bene veramente"	2015	Niccolò Celaia, Antonio Usbergo
"Parole in circolo"	2016	Niccolò Celaia, Antonio Usbergo
"Solo due satelliti"	2016	Antonio Usbergo, Niccolò Celaia, Michael Schermi
"Sai che"	2016	Antonio Usbergo, Niccolò Celaia
"Onde" (Sondr remix)	2017	Alessio Boni
"Come neve" (with Giorgia)	2017	Antonio Usbergo, Niccolò Celaia
"Voglio"	2018	Antonio Usbergo, Niccolò Celaia
"Buona vita"	2018	Shipmate (Riccardo Bellei, Giuseppe Muschio Schiavone)
"Hola" (featuring Tom Walker)	2018	Shipmate, Giulio Rosati
"Muhammed Ali"	2019	Antonio Usbergo, Niccolò Celaia
"Duemila volte"	2019	Shipmate, Giulio Rosati
"Venere e Marte" (Takagi & Ketra featuring Marco Mengoni and Frah Quintale)	2021	Antonio Usbergo, Niccolò Celaia
"Ma stasera"	2021	Roberto Ortu
"Cambia un uomo"	2021	Roberto Ortu
"Mi fiderò"	2022	Roberto Ortu
"No stress"	2022	Roberto Ortu
"Tutti i miei ricordi"	2022	Roberto Ortu
"Due vite"	2023	Roberto Ortu
"Pazza musica" (featuring Elodie)	2023	Roberto Ortu

== Notes ==
- A According to FIMI's criteria for compiling the Italian Albums Chart, the albums Materia (Terra) and Materia (Pelle) are considered as a single entry. Therefore, the peak position for Materia (Pelle) also includes sales of Materia (Terra).
- B The EPs Dove si vola and Re matto charted on the Italian FIMI Albums chart, while #prontoacorrerespain was only eligible to chart on the Italian FIMI Top Digital Downloads chart, peaking at number 18.
- C "L'essenziale" did not chart on the Walloon Ultratop 50, but charted at number 27 on the Walloon Ultratip chart, which acts as an extension to the Ultratop 50.
- D "L'essenziale" did not chart on the Flemish Ultratop 50, but charted at number 31 on the Flemish Ultratip chart, which acts as an extension to the Ultratop 50.

Additional notes
