= Marco Mengoni Live =

Live album by Marco Mengoni
- Released: 25 November 2016
- Recorded: 2016
- Genre: Pop, Pop rock
- Length: 65:01 (disc 1); 61:03 (disc 2)
- Language: Italian, English

Marco Mengoni chronology
Le cose che non ho (2015)	Marco Mengoni Live (2016)	Onde EP (2017)

Singles from Marco Mengoni Live
- 1. "Sai che" Released: 14 October 2016

Marco Mengoni Live is the second live album by Italian recording artist Marco Mengoni, released on 25 November 2016 and also featuring 5 previously unreleased studio tracks. The album was preceded by the single "Sai che", released on 14 October 2016. Marco Mengoni Live is the last chapter of Mengoni's project Parole in circolo, which also included the studio albums Parole in circolo and Le cose che non ho, both released in 2015.

The album debuted at number one on the Italian Albums Chart, and it was later certified platinum by the Federation of the Italian Music Industry.

== Track listing ==
CD 1 – Inediti + Live Part 1
No.	Title	Length
1.	"Sai che"	4:27
2.	"Se imparassimo"	3:17
3.	"Ad occhi chiusi (Light in You)" (feat. Paloma Faith)	4:11
4.	"Onde"	3:22
5.	"Proteggiti da me"	4:02
6.	"Power"	2:56
7.	"Intro Mengoni Live 2016"	2:04
8.	"Ti ho voluto bene veramente"	3:14
9.	"Non me ne accorgo"	3:27
10.	"Nemmeno un grammo"	3:13
11.	"Resti indifferente"	3:16
12.	"Parole in circolo"	3:48
13.	"Esseri umani"	4:12
14.	"Ricorderai l'amore"	4:09
15.	"Dove si vola"	3:30
16.	"Pronto a correre"	3:47
17.	"Ad occhi chiusi"	4:11
18.	"Mai e per sempre"	3:55
Total length:		65:01

CD 2 – Live Part 2
No.	Title	Length
1.	"In un giorno qualunque"	6:23
2.	"Tonight"	4:11
3.	"I Got the Fear"	5:17
4.	"Freedom"	4:11
5.	"Non passerai"	4:15
6.	"Solo due satelliti"	3:41
7.	"L'essenziale"	3:40
8.	"La valle dei re"	6:23
9.	"Una parola"	4:53
10.	"La nostra estate"	3:28
11.	"Io ti aspetto"	5:13
12.	"Iron Warrior"	3:53
13.	"Guerriero"	5:35
Total length:		61:03

== Charts ==
Chart (2015)	Peak position
Belgian Albums (Ultratop Wallonia)	135
Italian Albums (FIMI)	1
Swiss Albums (Schweizer Hitparade)	22

== Certifications ==
Region	Certification	Certified units/sales
Italy (FIMI)	Platinum	50,000^{*}
^{*} Sales figures based on certification alone.
