= List of number-one hits of 2010 (Italy) =

This is a list of the number-one hits of 2010 on FIMI's Italian Singles and Albums Charts.

Week	Issue date	Song	Artist	Album	Artist
1	4 January	"Bad Romance"	Lady Gaga	Tracks 2 (inediti & rarità)	Vasco Rossi
2	11 January	"Baciami ancora"	Jovanotti	Tracks 2 (inediti & rarità)	Vasco Rossi
3	18 January	"Baciami ancora"	Jovanotti	Tracks 2 (inediti & rarità)	Vasco Rossi
4	25 January	"Baciami ancora"	Jovanotti	Tracks 2 (inediti & rarità)	Vasco Rossi
5	1 February	"Baciami ancora"	Jovanotti	Soldier of Love	Sade
6	8 February	"Baciami ancora"	Jovanotti	Soldier of Love	Sade
7	15 February	"Per tutta la vita"	Noemi	Re matto	Marco Mengoni
8	22 February	"Per tutte le volte che..."	Valerio Scanu	Re matto	Marco Mengoni
9	1 March	"Baciami ancora"	Jovanotti	Re matto	Marco Mengoni
10	8 March	"Per tutta la vita"	Noemi	Re matto	Marco Mengoni
11	15 March	"Each Tear"	Mary J. Blige featuring Tiziano Ferro	Oltre	Emma Marrone
12	22 March	"Di notte"	Pierdavide Carone	Oltre	Emma Marrone
13	29 March	"Calore"	Emma Marrone	Una canzone pop	Pierdavide Carone
14	5 April	"Calore"	Emma Marrone	Una canzone pop	Pierdavide Carone
15	12 April	"Un colpo all'anima"	Ligabue	Inaspettata	Biagio Antonacci
16	19 April	"Un colpo all'anima"	Ligabue	Inaspettata	Biagio Antonacci
17	26 April	"Un colpo all'anima"	Ligabue	Inaspettata	Biagio Antonacci
18	3 May	"Alors on danse"	Stromae	Inaspettata	Biagio Antonacci
19	10 May	"Quello che dai"	Marco Carta	Arrivederci, mostro!	Ligabue
20	17 May	"Waka Waka (This Time for Africa)"	Shakira featuring Freshlyground	Arrivederci, mostro!	Ligabue
21	24 May	"Waka Waka (This Time for Africa)"	Shakira featuring Freshlyground	Arrivederci, mostro!	Ligabue
22	31 May	"Waka Waka (This Time for Africa)"	Shakira featuring Freshlyground	Arrivederci, mostro!	Ligabue
23	7 June	"Waka Waka (This Time for Africa)"	Shakira featuring Freshlyground	Semplicemente sei	Gigi D'Alessio
24	14 June	"Waka Waka (This Time for Africa)"	Shakira featuring Freshlyground	Arrivederci, mostro!	Ligabue
25	21 June	"Waka Waka (This Time for Africa)"	Shakira featuring Freshlyground	Vasco London Instant Live 04.05.2010	Vasco Rossi
26	28 June	"Waka Waka (This Time for Africa)"	Shakira featuring Freshlyground	Vasco London Instant Live 04.05.2010	Vasco Rossi
27	5 July	"Waka Waka (This Time for Africa)"	Shakira featuring Freshlyground	Vasco London Instant Live 04.05.2010	Vasco Rossi
28	12 July	"Waka Waka (This Time for Africa)"	Shakira featuring Freshlyground	Arrivederci, mostro!	Ligabue
29	19 July	"Waka Waka (This Time for Africa)"	Shakira featuring Freshlyground	Arrivederci, mostro!	Ligabue
30	26 July	"Waka Waka (This Time for Africa)"	Shakira featuring Freshlyground	Arrivederci, mostro!	Ligabue
31	2 August	"Waka Waka (This Time for Africa)"	Shakira featuring Freshlyground	She Wolf	Shakira
32	9 August	"Waka Waka (This Time for Africa)"	Shakira featuring Freshlyground	She Wolf	Shakira
33	16 August	"Waka Waka (This Time for Africa)"	Shakira featuring Freshlyground	The Final Frontier	Iron Maiden
34	23 August	"Waka Waka (This Time for Africa)"	Shakira featuring Freshlyground	The Final Frontier	Iron Maiden
35	30 August	"Waka Waka (This Time for Africa)"	Shakira featuring Freshlyground	The Final Frontier	Iron Maiden
36	6 September	"Love the Way You Lie"	Eminem featuring Rihanna	Controcultura	Fabri Fibra
37	13 September	"White Knuckle Ride"	Jamiroquai	A Thousand Suns	Linkin Park
38	20 September	"Love the Way You Lie"	Eminem featuring Rihanna	Wonderlustre	Skunk Anansie
39	27 September	"Loca"	Shakira featuring Dizzee Rascal	Il mondo in un secondo	Alessandra Amoroso
40	4 October	"Loca"	Shakira featuring Dizzee Rascal	Il mondo in un secondo	Alessandra Amoroso
41	11 October	"Loca"	Shakira featuring Dizzee Rascal	Il mondo in un secondo	Alessandra Amoroso
42	18 October	"Loca"	Shakira featuring Dizzee Rascal	Re matto live	Marco Mengoni
43	25 October	"Loca"	Shakira featuring Dizzee Rascal	Sale el Sol	Shakira
44	1 November	"Loca"	Shakira featuring Dizzee Rascal	Chocabeck	Zucchero
45	8 November	"Only Girl (In the World)"	Rihanna	Chocabeck	Zucchero
46	15 November	"The Time (Dirty Bit)"	The Black Eyed Peas	Casa 69	Negramaro
47	22 November	"In punta di piedi"	Nathalie	Casa 69	Negramaro
48	29 November	"Tutto l'amore che ho"	Jovanotti	Arrivederci, mostro!	Ligabue
49	6 December	"Tutto l'amore che ho"	Jovanotti	Michael	Michael Jackson
50	13 December	"Tutto l'amore che ho"	Jovanotti	Michael	Michael Jackson
51	20 December	"Tutto l'amore che ho"	Jovanotti	Chocabeck	Zucchero
52	27 December	"Tutto l'amore che ho"	Jovanotti	Michael	Michael Jackson

== See also ==
- 2010 in music
- List of number-one hits in Italy
