= Materia =

Materia (Latin, 'material') may refer to:

== Music ==
- Materia (Terra), Materia (Pelle) and Materia (Prisma), a trilogy of albums by Marco Mengoni
- Materia, a 2006 album by Novembre
- Materia, a 2017 album by Cosmic Gate
- Materia, a 2017 album by Kshmr
- Materia (Julia Holter album), a 2026 album by Julia Holter
- Materia Collective, video game music publishing company for Deltarune

== Other uses ==
- Daihatsu Materia, a Japanese automobile
- Materia, a feature of the Final Fantasy VII video game

== See also ==
- Marteria, German electronic/rap artist
- Matter, in classical physics and general chemistry
- Philosophy of matter as contemplated by metaphysical philosophy
- Grand Materia, a 2005 album by Morgana Lefay
- Prima materia, in alchemy
- Materia medica, collected knowledge about the therapeutic properties of any substance used for healing
- Raw material, a basic material used to produce finished goods or intermediate materials
