= Re matto live =

Live album by Marco Mengoni
- Released: 19 October 2010
- Recorded: 15 July 2010, Genoa; 27 July 2010, Montesilvano
- Genre: Pop; rock
- Length: 67:55
- Language: Italian; English
- Label: Sony BMG

Marco Mengoni chronology
Re matto (2010)	Re matto live (2010)	Solo 2.0 (2011)

Re matto live is the first live album by Italian singer Marco Mengoni, released on 19 October 2010 by Sony Music. It features songs from his previous EPs, Re matto and Dove si vola, as well as covers of popular songs, originally performed by Italian singers such as Mina and Mia Martini, or by international artists like Jamiroquai and The Beatles.

The album includes a DVD and a Compact Disc. The DVD was recorded during Megoni's concert in Genova, on 15 July 2010, while the CD was recorded in Montesilvano (Pescara) on 27 July 2010.

== Track listing ==
Re matto live – Standard track listing
No.	Title	Writer(s)	Length
1.	"Rabbit's intro"	Piero Calabrese	1:39
2.	"Stanco (Deeper Inside)"	Marco Mengoni; Massimo Calabrese; P. Calabrese; Stefano Calabrese; Stella Fabiani	4:17
3.	"Paralyzer"	Scott Anderson; Sean Anderson; James Black; Rick Jackett; Rich Beddoe	3:26
4.	"In viaggio verso me"	Mengoni; M. Calabrese; P. Calabrese	3:14
5.	"In un giorno qualunque"	Mengoni; P. Calabrese	3:59
6.	"Helter Skelter"	John Lennon; Paul McCartney	3:19
7.	"Questa notte"	Mengoni; M. Calabrese; P. Calabrese; S. Calabrese	3:54
8.	"Lontanissimo da te"	M. Calabrese; P. Calabrese; Roberto Procaccini; Marco Del Bene	3:31
9.	"Insieme a te sto bene"	Giulio Rapetti; Lucio Battisti	3:50
10.	"Fino a ieri / Cosmic Girl"	Mengoni; M. Calabrese; P. Calabrese; Antongiulio Frulio; Ernesto Leveque / Jason Kay; Toby Smith; Derrick McKenzie; Stuart Zender; Simon Katz; Wallis Buchanan	4:46
11.	"Almeno tu nell'universo"	Maurizio Fabrizio; Bruno Lauzi	5:45
12.	"Mad World"	Roland Orzabal	3:36
13.	"See Me, Feel Me / Listening to You"	Peter Townshend	4:25
14.	"Nessuno"	Edilio Capotosti; Antonietta De Simone	3:31
15.	"La guerra"	Mengoni; M. Calabrese; P. Calabrese	3:22
16.	"Credimi ancora"	Mengoni; M. Calabrese; P. Calabrese; Stella Fabiani	7:36

Re matto live – iTunes edition bonus track
No.	Title	Writer(s)	Length
17.	"In un giorno qualunque" (New Studio version)	Mengoni; P. Calabrese	3:45

== Charts and certifications ==
Chart (2010)	Peak position	Certification	Sales
Italian Albums Chart	1	Platinum	60.000+

=== Year-end charts ===
Year	Chart	Position
2010	Italian Albums Chart	32
