= Atlantico (album) =

Studio album by Marco Mengoni
- Released: 30 November 2018
- Genre: Pop; R&B
- Length: 50:22
- Label: Sony Music
- Producer: Marco Mengoni; Christian Rigano; El Guincho; Fabrizio Ferraguzzo; Rudimental; Takagi & Ketra

Marco Mengoni chronology
Le cose che non ho (2015)	Atlantico (2018)	Materia (Terra) (2021)

Singles from Atlantico
- 1. "Voglio" Released: 19 October 2018; 2. "Buona vita" Released: 19 October 2018; 3. "Hola (I Say)" Released: 30 November 2018; 4. "Muhammad Ali" Released: 5 April 2019

Atlantico is the fifth studio album by Italian singer-songwriter Marco Mengoni, released by Sony Music Italy on 30 November 2018. The album was preceded by the singles "Voglio" and "Buona vita", simultaneously released in Italy on 19 October 2018.

After recording three albums with production direction by Michele Canova, Mengoni worked with a new creative team on Atlantico, including Mauro Pagani, Rudimental, Takagi & Ketra and El Guincho as well as authorial collaboration by Mahmood, Dario Faini, Tony Maiello and Frah Quintale. This resulted in a heterogeneus album, with electropop songs as well as acoustic songs, including also Latin sounds and rock influences, in order to reflect Mengoni's latest journeys and personal experiences.

A Spanish-language version of the album, titled Atlántico, was released on 18 January 2019.

== Track listing ==
Atlantico – Italian and International edition track listing
No.	Title	Writer(s)	Length
1.	"Voglio"	Marco Mengoni; Andrea Bonomo; Gianluigi Fazio	3:19
2.	"Hola (I Say)" (featuring Tom Walker)	Mengoni; Thomas Walker; Alessandro Mahmoud; Francesco Catitti	3:47
3.	"Buona vita"	Mengoni; Fabio Ilacqua	3:11
4.	"Muhammad Ali"	Mengoni; Antonio Maiello; Piero Romitelli; Davide Simonetta	3:07
5.	"La casa azul"	Mengoni; Ilacqua	3:12
6.	"Mille lire"	Mengoni; Mahmoud; Alessandro Merli; Fabio Clemente	3:10
7.	"Intro della ragione"	Mengoni; Giulia Monti; Daniele Parziani	1:33
8.	"La ragione del mondo"	Mengoni; Ilacqua	3:26
9.	"Amalia" (featuring Vanessa da Mata & Selton)	Mengoni; Vanessa da Mata Ferreira; Ilacqua	3:10
10.	"Rivoluzione"	Mengoni; Mahmoud; Dario Faini	3:27
11.	"Everest"	Mengoni; Maurizio Carucci; Faini	3:34
12.	"I giorni di domani"	Mengoni; Ilacqua	3:34
13.	"Atlantico"	Francesco Servidei; Faini	4:08
14.	"Hola"	Mengoni; Mahmoud; Catitti	3:48
15.	"Dialogo tra due pazzi"	Mengoni; Ilacqua	3:56

Atlántico Spanish edition track listing
No.	Title	Length
1.	"Quiero"	3:19
2.	"Hola (I Say)" (featuring Tom Walker)	3:47
3.	"Buena vida"	3:11
4.	"Muhammad Ali"	3:07
5.	"La casa azul"	3:23
6.	"Pa' que lo tires"	3:10
7.	"Intro della ragione"	1:33
8.	"Solo ahora"	3:26
9.	"Amalia" (featuring Vanessa da Mata & Selton)	3:10
10.	"Revoluciones"	3:27
11.	"Everest"	3:34
12.	"Los días de mañana"	4:08
13.	"A través del Atlántico"	3:23
14.	"Hola"	3:48
15.	"Dos locos"	3:56

== Charts ==
=== Weekly charts ===
Chart performance for Atlantico
Chart (2018–19)	Peak position
Italian Albums (FIMI)	1
Spanish Albums (PROMUSICAE)	25
Swiss Albums (Schweizer Hitparade)	20

=== Year-end charts ===
2018 year-end chart performance for Atlantico
Chart (2018)	Position
Italian Albums (FIMI)	12

== Certifications ==
Region	Certification	Certified units/sales
Italy (FIMI)	4× Platinum	200,000^{‡}
^{‡} Sales+streaming figures based on certification alone.
