= Atlántico =

Atlántico or Atlantico may refer to:

- Atlantico, a French news website
- The Atlantic Ocean, the second largest ocean in the world
- Atlántico Department in Colombia
- Banco Atlántico, a former Spanish bank, now part of the Banco Sabadell Group
- The Brazilian aircraft carrier Atlântico
- in Nicaragua:
  - South Caribbean Coast Autonomous Region, formerly the South Atlantic Coast Autonomous Region (Región Autónoma del Atlántico Sur)
  - North Caribbean Coast Autonomous Region, formerly the North Atlantic Coast Autonomous Region (Región Autónoma del Atlántico Norte)
- in Argentina:
  - Tierra del Fuego Province, Argentina (Provincia de Tierra del Fuego, Antártida e Islas del Atlántico Sur)
  - Islas del Atlántico Sur (department)
- Atlantico (album), a 2018 album by Marco Mengoni
