= L'eccezione (Madame song) =

Single by Madame
- Released: 15 April 2022
- Genre: Pop
- Length: 3:49
- Label: Sugar Music
- Songwriters: Francesca Calearo; Luca Faraone
- Producers: Dardust; Luca Faraone

Madame singles chronology
"Mi fiderò" (2021)	"L'eccezione" (2022)	"Pare" (2022)

"L'eccezione" (lit. 'The exception') is a song by Italian singer-songwriter Madame. It was produced by Dardust and Luca Faraone, and released on 15 April 2022 by Sugar Music.

The song was included in the original soundtrack of Amazon Prime Video's series Bang Bang Baby.

== Personnel ==
Credits adapted from Tidal.

- Dardust – producer
- Luca Faraone – producer and composer
- Madame – associated performer, author, vocals

== Charts ==
Chart performance for "L'eccezione"
Chart (2022)	Peak position
Italy (FIMI)	28
San Marino (SMRRTV Top 50)	12

== Certifications ==
Region	Certification	Certified units/sales
Italy (FIMI)	Platinum	100,000^{‡}
^{‡} Sales+streaming figures based on certification alone.
