= Dove si vola (album) =

EP by Marco Mengoni
- Released: December 4, 2009
- Recorded: 2009
- Genre: Pop
- Length: 24:55
- Languages: Italian; English
- Label: Sony Music
- Producers: Lucio Fabbri; Luca Rustici; Morgan; Piero Calabrese; Massimo Calabrese; Stella Fabiani

Marco Mengoni chronology
| Dove si vola (2009) | Re matto (2010) |

Singles from Dove si vola
- 1. "Dove si vola" Released: December 3, 2009

Dove si vola is the debut extended play by Italian singer Marco Mengoni. The record peaked at number 9 in the Italian Albums Chart and sold more than 70,000 copies in Italy, receiving Platinum certification from the Federation of the Italian Music Industry.

== Background and release ==
In December 2009, Mengoni won the third season of the Italian talent competition series X-Factor. The 7-track EP was recorded during his participation at the singing contest, and it was released by Sony Music on 4 December 2009, two days after his winning.

Dove si vola includes the previously unreleased song with the same title, written by Bungaro and Saverio Grandi and released as lead single. Mengoni performed it for the first time on 25 November 2009, during the semi-final live show of the talent show. The other tracks are "Lontanissimo da te", and 5 covers of popular Italian and international songs, chosen from the ones that his judge Morgan assigned him during the competition.

== Track listing ==
| No. | Title | Writer(s) | Length |
|---|---|---|---|
| 1. | "Dove si vola" | Antonio Calò; Saverio Grandi | 3:58 |
| 2. | "Man in the Mirror" | Siedah Garrett; Glen Ballard | 4:06 |
| 3. | "Psycho Killer" | David Byrne; Chris Frantz; Tina Weymouth | 3:20 |
| 4. | "Insieme a te sto bene" | Lucio Battisti; Giulio Rapetti | 3:19 |
| 5. | "L'amore si odia" | Diego Calvetti; Marco Ciappelli | 2:52 |
| 6. | "Almeno tu nell'universo" | Bruno Lauzi; Maurizio Fabrizio | 4:04 |
| 7. | "Lontanissimo da te" | Piero Calabrese; Massimo Calabrese; Roberto Procaccini; Marco Del Bene | 3:32 |

== Charts ==
| Chart (2009) | Peak position | Certification | Sales |
|---|---|---|---|
| Italian Albums Chart | 9 | Platinum | 70,000+ |

=== Year-end charts ===
| Year | Chart | Position |
|---|---|---|
| 2009 | Italian Albums Chart | 47 |
| 2010 | Italian Albums Chart | 61 |

== Personnel ==
- Marco Mengoni – vocals
- Pietro Caramelli – mastering
- Alessandra Tisato – photography
- Daniela Boccadoro – graphics
- Luca Rustici – arrangements, production, recording, mixing, computer programming, guitars, keyboards
- Valerio Gagliano – studio assistant
- Roberto Di Falco – studio assistant
- Lorenzo Cazzaniga – mastering
- Giancarlo Ippolito – drums
- Gaetano Diodato – bass
- Luciano Luisi – piano, keyboards
- Lucio Fabbri – production, bass, guitar, violin, viola, keyboards
- Alessandro Marcantoni – recording, mixing
- Roberto Gualdi – drums
- Salvo Calvo – guitar
- Stefano Cisotto – keyboards, computer programming
- Carlo Palmas – keyboards, computer programming
- Morgan – arrangements, production
- Piero Calabrese – production, arrangements, Pro Tools programming, keyboards
- Massimo Calabrese – production, bass
- Stella Fabiani – production
- Roberto Procaccini – arrangements, Pro Tools programming, keyboards
- Stefano Calabrese – recording, electric guitar
- Gianluca Vaccaro – mixing
- Marco Del Bene – electric guitar
- Alessandro Canini – drums
