= Materia (Pelle) =

Studio album by Marco Mengoni
- Released: 7 October 2022
- Genre: Pop; electropop; R&B
- Length: 40:06
- Label: Sony Music
- Producer: B-Croma; Cristiano Crisci; Dardust; E.D.D.; Mace; Noza; Populous; Simon Says!; Sixpm; Témé Tan; Zef

Marco Mengoni chronology
Materia (Terra) (2021)	Materia (Pelle) (2022)	Materia (Prisma) (2023)

Singles from Materia (Pelle)
- 1. "No Stress" Released: 6 May 2022; 2. "Tutti i miei ricordi" Released: 15 September 2022

Materia (Pelle) (transl. Material: Skin) is the seventh studio album by Italian singer-songwriter Marco Mengoni, released by Sony Music Italy on 7 October 2022 as the second part of the trilogy, Materia, consisting of three separately-released records: Terra, Pelle, and Prisma. Each part revolves around one of the album's central themes of the artist's personal musical journey throughout his career.

The album includes a cover of the song "Caro amore lontanissimo" by Sergio Endrigo, included in the soundtrack of the film The Hummingbird directed by Francesca Archibugi.

== Background and composition ==
The album is the second chapter of the Materia trilogy following up Materia (Terra). While Terra focused on the artist's musical origins and early influences, the content of Pelle is centered around the musical experiments of Mengoni with a more contemporary approach to music by drawing inspiration from electronic music while incorporating urban contemporary music elements. Several musicians and producers were involved in the making of the tracks, including Bresh, Dardust, Edwyn Roberts, Fabio Ilacqua and La Rappresentante di Lista.

Mengoni states, "To enrich ourselves culturally we need to know and understand new cultures and let them penetrate the fabric of our skin [...] I'm glad that a record revolving around diversity is dropping now considering the current climate of the world."

== Critical reception ==
Reviewing the album for Corriere della Sera, Giovanni Ferrari dwelled on the musical nuances, writing that the project "evolves, song after song, giving listeners new sounds and unprecedented sensations." Ferrari was impressed by the collaborations with La Rappresentante di Lista and Bresh, finding instead "Caro amore lontanissimo "the most surprising" of the project, appreciating the writing of Sergio Endrigo. Gianni Sibilla of Rockol wrote that "the theme is encounter and exchange, diversity as enrichment", noting a minor presence of ballads compared to the previous chapter.

Alessandro Alicandri of TV Sorrisi e Canzoni compared the album with the previous Materia (Terra), explaining that in the latter Mengoni managed to describe himself "in the most intimate and profound way possible" with a soulful musical production and songs with a "writing made of analysis, without filters; [...] therefore linked to a moment in life where isolation forced him to get in touch with his fragilities," while with Materia (Pelle) he denotes a willingness to "blossom from that ground, looking out and looking at himself from the outside, with new awareness," calling the songs "decidedly pop and more electronic than the previous record; [...] it makes unusual sounds palatable." At the end of the comparisons, the journalist questioned the choice of titling the second volume Pelle, considering it the quintessence or ether of the four elements of philosophy, that is, "something that on the one hand contrasts in all respects with the solidity of the earth and is in fact impalpable, often associated with the life force, to which the skin somehow turns out to be a witness."

Fabio Fiume of All Music Italia, conversely, expressed a more negative opinion of the record, finding the presence of "potential hits if you listen to them individually" that are, however, on the whole "disappointing." Fiume noted that the project "lacks fullness, lacks memorability, lacks the chance to fly that the artist did not allow himself here," not being impressed by the collaborations and finding too many musical affinities to Sam Smith and Michele Bravi.

== Track listing ==
Materia (Pelle) – Standard track listing
No.	Title	Writer(s)	Producer(s)	Length
1.	"No Stress"	Marco Mengoni; Davide Petrella; Stefano Tognini	Zef	2:52
2.	"In città"	Mengoni; Alessandro De Blasio; Leonardo Zaccaria; Vincenzo Colella; Simone Benussi	Mace	3:39
3.	"Attraverso te" (featuring La Rappresentante di Lista)	Mengoni; Veronica Lucchesi; Dario Mangiaracina; Simone Privitera	Simon Says!	3:11
4.	"Tutti i miei ricordi"	Mengoni; Alessandro La Cava; Roberto Casalino; Dario Faini	Dardust	3:24
5.	"Chiedimi come sto" (featuring Bresh)	Mengoni; Andrea Brasi; Piero Romitelli; Antonio Maiello	Marz; Zef	3:25
6.	"Migliore di me"	Mengoni; Raffaele Esposito	B-Croma; E.D.D.	3:35
7.	"Unatoka Wapi"	Mengoni; Fabio Ilacqua	Cristiano Crisci	4:28
8.	"Neruda"	Mengoni; Edwyn Roberts; Giordano Colombo; Giovanni Pallotti; Viviana Colombo; Privitera	Simon Says!	3:11
9.	"Parlami sopra"	Mengoni; Matteo Novi; Giovanni Cerrati; Colella; Tanguy Heasevoets; Vincent Van den Damme; Andrea Ferrara	Sixpm	2:55
10.	"Appunto 3. 16-03-2022"	Mengoni; Heasevoets; Van den Damme	B-Croma	1:38
11.	"Respira"	Mengoni; Ilacqua; Heasevoets; Van den Damme	Noza; Témé Tan	2:43
12.	"Appunto 4. 27-06-2022"	Mengoni; Giovanni Pallotti; Marco Spaggiari; Rocco Giovannoni	B-Croma	1:14
13.	"Ancora una volta" (with Samuele Bersani)	Mengoni; Ilacqua	E.D.D.	3:51

Materia (Pelle) – Physical edition bonus tracks
No.	Title	Writer(s)	Producer(s)	Length
14.	"Caro amore lontanissimo"	Sergio Endrigo; Riccardo Sinigallia	E.D.D.	4:27
15.	"Chiedimi come sto" (solo version)	Mengoni; Romitelli; Maiello	Marz; Zef	3:10

Materia (Pelle) – Digital 2023 re-issue bonus tracks
No.	Title	Writer(s)	Producer(s)	Length
1.	"Due vite"	Mengoni; Davide Petrella; Davide Simonetta	E.D.D.; Simonetta	3:45
2.	"Let It Be" (with The Kingdom Choir)	John Lennon; Paul McCartney	E.D.D.	3:49

== Charts ==
=== Weekly charts ===
Chart performance for Materia (Pelle)
Chart (2022)	Peak position
Italian Albums (FIMI)	2
Swiss Albums (Schweizer Hitparade)	43

=== Year-end charts ===
2022 year-end chart performance for Materia (Pelle)
Chart (2022)	Peak position
Italian Albums (FIMI)	8
