= Mi fiderò =

Single by Marco Mengoni featuring Madame

from the album Materia (Terra)
- Released: 31 December 2021
- Genre: Synth pop
- Length: 3:30
- Songwriters: Marco Mengoni; Francesca Calearo; Alex Andrea Vella; Riccardo Scirè; Antonio Maiello
- Producer: Purple Disco Machine

Marco Mengoni singles chronology
"Cambia un uomo" (2021)	"Mi fiderò" (2021)	"No Stress" (2022)

Madame singles chronology
"Perso nel buio" (2021)	"Mi fiderò" (2021)	"L'eccezione" (2022)

"Mi fiderò" (lit. 'I will trust') is a song co-written and recorded by Italian singer Marco Mengoni, with featured guest vocals by Italian singer Madame. The song was released on 31 December 2021 by Sony Music as the third single from Mengoni's sixth studio album Materia (Terra).

== Background ==
Written by Mengoni and Madame with Alex Andrea Vella, Riccardo Scirè and Tony Maiello, the song was produced by Purple Disco Machine. It is a song about trust, described as the key element in every relationship, not only related to rationality, but also tied to primordial elements such as instinct and chemistry.

== Music video ==
The music video for the song was released on 14 January 2022. Directed by Riccardo Ortu, the video features actor Vincenzo Crea and was shot in the suburbs of Rome.

== Live performances ==
Marco Mengoni performed the song, without Madame's contribution, during the final of the Sanremo Music Festival 2022, appearing as a guest artist.

== Charts ==
Chart (2022)	Peak position
Italy (FIMI)	12
San Marino (SMRRTV Top 50)	3

== Certifications ==
Region	Certification	Certified units/sales
Italy (FIMI)	4× Platinum	400,000^{‡}
^{‡} Sales+streaming figures based on certification alone.
