= Due vite =

2023 song by Marco Mengoni

Single by Marco Mengoni

from the album Materia (Prisma)
- Released: 8 February 2023
- Genre: Pop
- Length: 3:45 (original version); 3:04 (Eurovision version)
- Label: Sony Music
- Songwriters: Marco Mengoni; Davide Petrella; Davide Simonetta
- Producers: E.D.D.; Davide Simonetta

Marco Mengoni singles chronology
"Tutti i miei ricordi" (2022)	"Due vite" (2023)	"Pazza musica" (2023)

Alternative covers
- Eurovision version cover

Music video
- "Due vite" on YouTube

Eurovision Song Contest 2023 entry
- Country: Italy
- Artist: Marco Mengoni
- Language: Italian
- Composers: Davide Petrella; Davide Simonetta
- Lyricists: Marco Mengoni; Davide Petrella; Davide Simonetta

Finals performance
- Final result: 4th
- Final points: 350

Entry chronology
- ◄ "Brividi" (2022)
- "La noia" (2024) ►

Official performance video
- "Due vite" (Grand Final) on YouTube

"Due vite" (Italian pronunciation: [ˈduːe ˈviːte]; transl. "Two lives") is a song co-written and recorded by Italian singer-songwriter Marco Mengoni, released by Sony Music on 8 February 2023 as the lead single from his eighth studio album Materia (Prisma). The song was written by Mengoni with co-writing contribution by Davide Petrella and Davide Simonetta. The latter also produced the track with E.D.D. The song served as Mengoni's winning entry for the Sanremo Music Festival 2023, the 73rd edition of the Italian musical festival, which doubled as the selection of the Italian act for the Eurovision Song Contest 2023. It finished in fourth place at the Eurovision final with 350 points. Prior to the contest, "Due vite" reached number one in Italy.

A bilingual French-Italian version of the song, titled "La Dernière Chanson" ("The last song"), was released on 13 October 2023.

== Background and composition ==
Mengoni spoke about the meaning of the song:

It is my never-ending story because it is the story of a relationship between reason and the unconscious. I am devoting a lot of hours a week to my thoughts with a professional and I am realising that my unconscious gives me more realistic input than everyday life. I speak about this double life in the song: the life of the night and dreams that becomes more real than the dreams themselves, and the life I live every day. [...] I am a sinner, I am one who makes mistakes. There are slaps and you have to go on in life. There are moments of boredom and downsides that are needed like all things: for me, "Due vite" is this.

Mengoni dwelt on the inspiration for the song, found in the figure of Italian singer-songwriter Lucio Dalla, explaining that:

It is a song full of words, a continuous tension that never seems to explode until the moment I leave my vocal cords there, at Sanremo. It wasn't easy to tackle this piece, but the great thing is that we got carried away by Lucio Dalla, letting him inspire us, remembering him. I approached singing in this way: little breath, lots of words and a lot of tension to then explode.

The song also marks the singer's third participation at the Sanremo Music Festival after "Credimi ancora" in 2010 and "L'essenziale", winner of the Sanremo Music Festival 2013, with which he represented Italy at the Eurovision Song Contest 2013.

== Reception ==
The song was mostly well received by Italian critics. In its review of the Sanremo 2023 songs, Corriere della Sera gave "Due vite" an 8/10, describing the song as a "classic ballad" that "doses melody and rhythm well", where "thoughts chase each other". Also Valentina Colosimo from Vanity Fair states that the song "allows Mengoni to show off all his singing skills", bringing the viewer "a ton of feelings". Fabio Fiume from All Music Italia rated the song 7.5/10, writing the song is a "modern piece that respects both its vocal beauty and its best prerogatives to be personal". The Panorama critic Gabriele Antonucci gave the song a 8.5 rating, he praised Mengoni's performance as "masterful", with a perfect combination of "voice, words and arrangement". Less enthusiastic was the review by Francesco Prisco of Il Sole 24 Ore, assigning a score of 6-/10, writing that "Mengoni does Mengoni: the thing he does best", suggesting a lack of originality compared to his previous works.

== Music video ==
The music video for the song was directed by Roberto Ortu. The filming took place on the dunes of Piscinas in Sardinia.

== Charts ==
=== Weekly charts ===
Weekly chart performance for "Due vite"
Chart (2023)	Peak position
Austria (Ö3 Austria Top 40)	50
Global 200 (Billboard)	80
Croatia (HRT)	35
German Singles Downloads (GfK Entertainment)	13
Greece International (IFPI)	21
Iceland (Tónlistinn)	16
Italy (FIMI)	1
Lithuania (AGATA)	14
Malta (Radiomonitor)	20
Netherlands (Single Tip)	29
Sweden (Sverigetopplistan)	56
Switzerland (Schweizer Hitparade)	2
UK Singles Downloads (Official Charts)	40

=== Year-end charts ===
2023 year-end chart performance for "Due vite"
Chart (2023)	Position
Italy (FIMI)	2
Switzerland (Schweizer Hitparade)	99

2024 year-end chart performance for "Due vite"
Chart (2024)	Position
Italy (FIMI)	68

== Certifications ==
Certifications for "Due vite"
Region	Certification	Certified units/sales
Italy (FIMI)	6× Platinum	600,000^{‡}
Switzerland (IFPI Switzerland)	Platinum	15,000^{‡}
^{‡} Sales+streaming figures based on certification alone.
