= Re matto =

EP by Marco Mengoni
- Released: 17 February 2010
- Recorded: 2010
- Genres: Pop; rock
- Length: 24:16
- Language: Italian
- Label: Sony Music
- Producers: Stefano Calabrese; Stella Fabiani; Marco Mengoni; Gianluca Vaccaro

Marco Mengoni chronology
Dove si vola (2009)	Re matto (2010)	Re matto live (2010)

Singles from Re matto
- 1. "Credimi ancora" Released: 17 February 2010; 2. "Stanco (Deeper Inside)" Released: 7 May 2010; 3. "In un giorno qualunque" Released: 1 October 2010

Re matto (Italian: [ˈre mˈmatto]; English: "Mad King") is the second extended play by Italian singer Marco Mengoni, released on 17 February 2010 by Sony Music. In Italy the album sold more than 82.000 copies and received double platinum certification from the Federation of the Italian Music Industry.

The lead single from the album. "Credimi ancora" was released on the same day. The song placed third during the 60th Sanremo Music Festival competition and debuted at number 3 on the Italian Singles Chart.

The other singles from the album were "Stanco (Deeper Inside)", released in May 2011, and the ballad "In un giorno qualunque", released on 1 October 2010.

== Background ==
In October 2010, Mengoni explained the reason why he decided to title his album Re matto (in English, "Crazy king"):

King because, when you participate in a talent show they put you on a pedestal, even if when you go back home you realize that you didn't change and that you don't have a crown on your head. Crazy is the word that I hope will follow me for my whole life: crazy people are the most free existing beings.

The album was recorded in early 2010, immediately after the release of hir first record project, Dove si vola. It was produced by Stefano Calabrese, Stella Fabiani, Marco Mengoni and Gianluca Vaccaro for "Cantieri Musicali".

== Composition and themes ==
The album features songs with different musical styles. "Credimi ancora" is a symphonic rock song, while "Questa notte" and "In un giorno qualunque" are typical Italian-style pop ballads. Other tracks are influenced by dance music, such as "Fino a ieri", while the second single, "Stanco (Deeper Inside)" has been described by critics as a pop-house song. Moreover, the Italian critic Mario Luzzatto Fegiz wrote that in "Re matto" Mengoni sometimes calls to mind David Bowie and Lou Reed.

During an interview with the Italian radio programme Deejay chiama Italia, Mengoni said that he chose to record an album with different types of songs in order to allow himself to follow different expressive styles in the future. During the same interview, he stated that the song "Questa Notte" was influenced by Paolo Nutini's music.

== Release and promotion ==
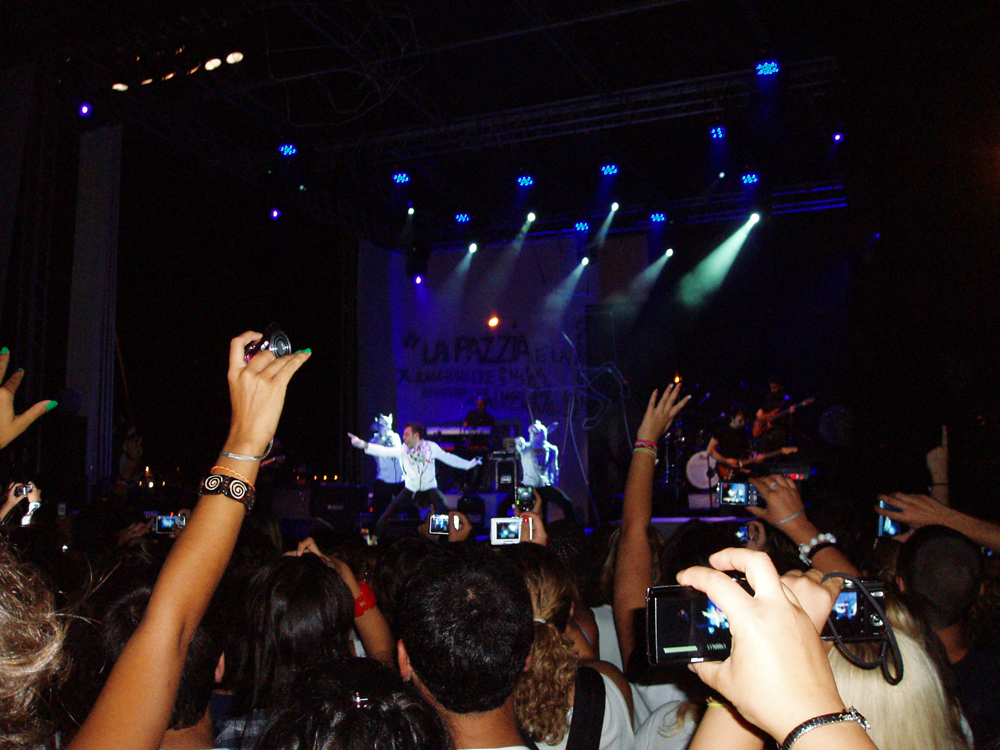
Marco Mengoni during a concert in San Benedetto del Tronto

The digital version of the album was released on 17 February 2010, two days before the physical version. To promote the album, Mengoni competed during the 60th Sanremo Music Festival, participating with the song "Credimi ancora". In addition, Mengoni appeared in several Italian TV programmes, including Domenica In, Domenica 5, and Porta a Porta.

From February 2010 to March 2010 Mengoni promoted his album through an in-store tour, while the Re matto tour, the singer's first concert tour, officially started on 3 May 2010 in Milan and ended in September 2010 with a concert in the same town, at the PalaSharp arena during the Festa dell'Unità. The "Re matto tour" consisted of 56 concerts throughout Italy.

== Critical reception ==
Professional ratings
Review scores
Source	Rating
AllMusic	2.5/5 stars
Musica e dischi	3.5/5 stars

The album received mixed reviews. Jason Birchmeier gave the album a negative review, claiming that "there's little substance on this 24-minute EP and too much of the material is half-baked".

Guido Marco gave it 3.5 stars out of 5 and wrote on the Italian music magazine Musica e dischi that "the mix of vocal neurotic flashes on a pop rock musical texture, with an absolutely simple and incisive lexicon, makes of Mengoni something more than a promise".

Italian popular critic Mario Luzzatto Fegiz wrote on the newspaper Il Corriere della Sera that Mengoni is not always at the same level as in "Credimi Ancora", but he has charisma and a great gift in giving renditions of his song.

== Commercial performance ==
The album debuted at number 1 on the Italian Albums Chart, holding down the number one spot for four weeks. In April 2010 it was certified Platinum and in January 2011 the copies sold by Re matto were more than 82.000.

== Track list ==
Re matto – Standard track listing
No.	Title	Writer(s)	Length
1.	"Credimi ancora"	Marco Mengoni; Stella Fabiani; Piero Calabrese; Massimo Calabrese	3:27
2.	"Questa notte"	Mengoni; Stefano Calabrese; P. Calabrese; M. Calabrese	3:21
3.	"Stanco (Deeper Inside)"	Mengoni; Fabiani; P. Calabrese; M. Calabrese; S. Calabrese	4:04
4.	"In un giorno qualunque"	Mengoni; P. Calabrese	3:42
5.	"Fino a ieri"	Mengoni; Antongiulio Frulio; Ernesto Leveque; M. Calabrese; P. Calabrese	3:22
6.	"In viaggio verso me"	Mengoni; M. Calabrese; P. Calabrese	2:45
7.	"La guerra"	Mengoni; M. Calabrese; P. Calabrese	3:26

Re matto – iTunes edition bonus tracks
No.	Title	Writer(s)	Length
8.	"Tears in Heaven" (Eric Clapton Cover - live)	Eric Clapton	4:45
9.	"Stanco (Deeper Inside)" (Mistify Noise Remix)	Mengoni; Fabiani; P. Calabrese; M. Calabrese; S. Calabrese	4:27

== Charts and certifications ==
Chart (2010)	Peak position	Certification	Sales
Italian Albums Chart	1	2× Platinum	82.000+
European Top 100 Albums	29	–	–

=== Year-end charts ===
Year	Chart	Position
2010	Italian Albums Chart	9

== Personnel ==
- Marco Mengoni – vocals, backing vocals
- Fabio Gurian – strings
- Piero Calabrese – keyboards, computer programming
- Massimo Calabrese – bass
- Stefano Calabrese – electric guitar, acoustic guitar
- Alessandro Canini – drums
- Roberto Procaccini – piano, keyboards, computer programming
- Peter Cornacchia – electric guitar, acoustic guitar, classical guitar
- Marco Rinalduzzi – acoustic guitar, twelve-string guitar
- Davide Colomba – backing vocals
- Giovanni Pallotti – bass
- Chris Cags – radio speaker
- Andrea Secchi – intro radio editing concept
