= Materia (Terra) =

Studio album by Marco Mengoni
- Released: 3 December 2021
- Genre: Pop; R&B; soul; blues
- Length: 32:50
- Label: Sony Music
- Producer: Andrea Suriani; B-Croma; Ceri; E.D.D.; FLIM; Mace; Venerus; Purple Disco Machine; Taketo Gohara

Marco Mengoni chronology
Atlantico (2018)	Materia (Terra) (2021)	Materia (Pelle) (2022)

Singles from Materia (Terra)
- 1. "Ma stasera" Released: 18 June 2021; 2. "Cambia un uomo" Released: 29 October 2021; 3. "Mi fiderò" Released: 31 December 2021

Materia (Terra) (transl. 'Material: Ground') is the sixth studio album by Italian singer-songwriter Marco Mengoni, released on 3 December 2021 by Sony Music Italy. The album served as the first part of a trilogy, Materia, consisting of three separately-released parts: Terra, Pelle, and Prisma. Each part revolves around one of the album's central themes of the artist's personal musical journey throughout his career.

== Background and development ==
The album consists of eleven songs and is the first chapter of a trilogy following the various sounds that have influenced the artistry of Mengoni.

The singer describes the concept and theme of the album, "I chose to name the album Materia, Terra because, in the last couple of years, I took the time to reflect, to reassess and see where I head from here, going back to my roots and early inspirations of my music [...] Also, my mother is a great listener of Afro-American/soul/gospel/R'n'B music and since I was a child those sounds have accompanied me [...] as well as drawing influences from my idols like John Lennon and The Rolling Stones."

== Track listing ==
Materia (Terra) – Standard track listing
No.	Title	Writer(s)	Producer(s)	Length
1.	"Cambia un uomo"	Marco Mengoni; Daniele Magro	Mace; Venerus	3:55
2.	"Una canzone triste"	Mengoni; Magro	Ceri; E.D.D.	3:34
3.	"Il meno possibile" (featuring Gazzelle)	Mengoni; Flavio Pardini; Simone Cremonini; Alex Andrea Vella; Andrea Pugliese; Davide Simonetta	Ceri; E.D.D.	2:59
4.	"In due minuti"	Mengoni; Raffaele Esposito	Taketo Gohara	2:59
5.	"Mi fiderò" (featuring Madame)	Mengoni; Francesca Calearo; Vella; Antonio Maiello; Riccaro Scirè	Purple Disco Machine	3:30
6.	"Ma stasera"	Mengoni; Davide Petrella; Federica Abbate; Francesco Catitti	Purple Disco Machine	3:43
7.	"Appunto 1. 23-01-2021"		B-Croma	1:19
8.	"Proibito"	Mengoni; Petrella; Michele Canova	Andrea Suriani; B-Croma; Flim	3:08
9.	"Appunto 2. 14-05-2021"		B-Croma	0:44
10.	"Luce"	Mengoni; Lorenzo Vizzini	E.D.D.	4:04
11.	"Un fiore contro il diluvio"	Mengoni; Magro	E.D.D.	2:55

Materia (Terra) – Physical edition bonus tracks
No.	Title	Producer(s)	Length
12.	"Il meno possibile" (Solo version)	Ceri; E.D.D.	2:59
13.	"Mi fiderò" (Solo version)	Purple Disco Machine	3:30

== Charts ==
Chart performance for Materia (Terra)
Chart (2021)	Peak position
Italian Albums (FIMI)	2
Swiss Albums (Schweizer Hitparade)	32

== Certifications ==
Region	Certification	Certified units/sales
Italy (FIMI)	6× Platinum	300,000^{‡}
^{‡} Sales+streaming figures based on certification alone.
