= Come neve =

Single by Giorgia and Marco Mengoni

from the album Oronero Live
- Language: Italian
- Released: 1 December 2017
- Recorded: 2017
- Genre: Pop soul
- Length: 3:29
- Label: Sony Music
- Songwriters: Giorgia Todrani; Marco Mengoni; Davide Simonetta; Antonio Maiello
- Producer: Michele Canova

Giorgia singles chronology
"Scelgo ancora te" (2017)	"Come neve" (2017)	"Le tasche piene di sassi" (2018)

Marco Mengoni singles chronology
"Onde (Sondr Remix)" (2017)	"Come neve" (2017)	"Voglio" (2017)

Music video
- "Come neve" on YouTube

"Come neve" is a song co-written and recorded by Italian singers Giorgia and Marco Mengoni. The song was released on 1 December 2017 from Giorgia's live album Oronero Live through Sony Music.

It peaked at number three of the Italian singles chart, becoming Mengoni's 12th and Todrani's 22nd top-ten song.

== Background and composition ==
In 2015 in an interview Mengoni talked about Giorgia saying that "thanks to her I took a more soulful path in my musical caree" because he was influenced by black music and that "in Italy Giorgia was the icon of Italian black music". In 2016 in an interview for TG1 Giorgia said that she would like to write a song for Mengoni, because "it's easier for me writing for other arthist than to myself".

The song was written by the singers themself with Davide Simonetta and Tony Maiello, with the production of Michele Canova Iorfida.

== Reception ==
Alessandro Alicandri of TV Sorrisi e Canzoni wrote that "it'sinteresting how the two souls bond and do not sing, as they often do, telling the story from two points of view", finding that the song finds no final closure but remains "suspended" to indicate "a painful thanksgiving that resurfaces in the silence of a heart that no one cares for anymore."

Vanity Fair Italia wrote that "the sound of the piano and the seemingly cold and gloomy atmospheres" while "slowly melts into a cry of hope and love". The performance was described without "virtuosity or mannerism" but "intense and heartfelt that explodes into an orchestral refrain embellished with strings and woodwinds". Billboard Italia defined the song an "extraordinary collaboration" which "explains how to hide one's pain from others by masking it behind a distorted appearance".

== Music video ==
The music video was directed by YouNuts!. The make-up effects were made by designer Andrea Leanza.

== Charts ==
Chart (2017)	Peak position
Italy (FIMI)	3
Switzerland (Schweizer Hitparade)	76

== Certifications ==
Certifications for "Come neve"
Region	Certification	Certified units/sales
Italy (FIMI)	2× Platinum	100,000^{‡}
^{‡} Sales+streaming figures based on certification alone.
