= Dove si vola =

Single by Marco Mengoni

from the EP Dove si vola
- Released: 3 December 2009
- Recorded: L'n'R' Studio, Alari Park Studio, 2009
- Genre: Pop
- Length: 3:58
- Label: Sony Music
- Songwriters: Antonio Calò; Saverio Grandi
- Producer: Luca Rustici

Marco Mengoni singles chronology
"Dove si vola" (2009)	"Credimi ancora" (2010)

"Dove si vola" (meaning "Where we fly" in Italian) is the debut single by Italian singer Marco Mengoni, released on December 3 2009 by Sony Music as the lead single from his debut EP by the same name.

The song was written by Bungaro and Saverio Grandi and it was produced by Luca Rustici. Mengoni performed the song for the first time during the semi-finals of the talent show X Factor, aired on 27 November 2009.

The single debuted at number 1 in the Italian Singles Chart on 10 December 2009. No official video was made to accompany the song.

== Background ==
The single was officially released by Sony Music as a digital download immediately after Mengoni was announced winner of the talent-show. It is also included in Mengoni's debut EP, Dove si vola.

Mengoni's mentor, Morgan, revealed that the song had been originally composed for Chiara Ranieri, another contestant in the third series of The X-Factor, but the song was reassigned to Mengoni, the eventual winner, after Chiara Ranieri was eliminated in an earlier round.

== Track listing ==
No.	Title	Writer(s)	Length
1.	"Dove si vola"	Bungaro, Saverio Grandi	3:58

== Charts ==
=== Weekly charts ===
Chart (2009)	Peak position
Italian Singles Chart	1

=== Year-end charts ===
Chart (2009)	Position
Italian Singles Chart	62
