= Solo (Vuelta al ruedo) =

Single by Marco Mengoni

from the album Solo 2.0
- Released: 1 September 2011
- Recorded: October 2010 – August 2011; Biplano Studio (Rome)
- Genre: Pop
- Length: 4:08 (Single version); 4:26 (Album Version)
- Label: Sony Music Entertainment
- Songwriters: Marco Mengoni, Piero Calabrese, Massimo Calabrese, Stella Fabiani, Stefano Calabrese

Marco Mengoni singles chronology
"In un giorno qualunque" (2010)	"Solo (Vuelta al ruedo)" (2011)	"Tanto il resto cambia" (2011)

"Solo (Vuelta al ruedo)" is a single by Italian singer Marco Mengoni. The song was released as the lead single from his first studio album Solo 2.0 on 1 September 2011, and it was released to mainstream radios on 2 September 2011. It was written by Marco Mengoni, Piero Calabrese, Massimo Calabrese, Stella Fabiani and Stefano Calabrese. The song peaked at number 4 on the Italian Singles Chart.

== Music video ==
The music video for the song, directed by Gianluca "Calu" Montesano, was premiered by MSN Video on 7 September 2011. The video was uploaded to YouTube on 11 September 2011.

== Track listing ==
Digital download
No.	Title	Writer(s)	Length
1.	"Solo (Vuelta al ruedo)"	Marco Mengoni, Piero Calabrese, Massimo Calabrese, Stella Fabiani, Stefano Calabrese	4:08

== Chart performance ==
Weekly chart performance for "Solo"
Chart (2011)	Peak position
Italy (FIMI)	4

Annual chart rankings for "Solo"
Chart (2011)	Rank
Italy (Musica e dischi)	74

== Release history ==
Street dates for "Solo"
Region	Date	Format	Label
Italy	1 September 2011	Digital download	Sony Music Entertainment
