= Venere e Marte (song) =

2021 song by Takagi & Ketra

- Official cover

Single by Takagi & Ketra, Marco Mengoni and Frah Quintale
- Released: 8 January 2021
- Length: 3:42
- Label: Sony Music
- Songwriters: Francesco Servidei; Federica Abbate; Alessandro Merli; Fabio Clemente
- Producers: Takagi & Ketra

Takagi & Ketra singles chronology
"Ciclone" (2020)	"Venere e Marte" (2021)	"Shimmy Shimmy" (2021)

Marco Mengoni singles chronology
"Duemila volte" (2019)	"Venere e Marte" (2021)	"Ma stasera" (2021)

Frah Quintale singles chronology
"Gabbiani" (2020)	"Venere e Marte" (2021)	"Sì può darsi" (2021)

Music video
- "Venere e Marte" on YouTube

"Venere e Marte" is a song by Italian musical duo Takagi & Ketra and Italian singers Marco Mengoni and Frah Quintale. Written by the two producers with Frah Quintale and Federica Abbate, it was released by Sony Music on 8 January 2021.

The song peaked at number 2 on the Italian singles chart and was certified double platinum in Italy.

== Music video ==
A music video of "Venere e Marte", starring actors Serena De Ferrari and Alessio La Padula, was released on 11 January 2021 via the YouTube channel of Takagi & Ketra. It was directed by YouNuts! and shot in Cinecittà World.

== Charts ==
=== Weekly charts ===
Weekly chart performance for "Venere e Marte"
Chart (2021)	Peak position
Italy (FIMI)	2

=== Year-end charts ===
Year-end chart performance for "Venere e Marte"
Chart (2021)	Position
Italy (FIMI)	41

== Certifications ==
Region	Certification	Certified units/sales
Italy (FIMI)	2× Platinum	140,000^{‡}
^{‡} Sales+streaming figures based on certification alone.
