= Solo 2.0 =

Studio album by Marco Mengoni
- Released: 27 September 2011
- Recorded: October 2010 – August 2011; Biplano Studio (Rome)
- Genres: Pop; rock
- Length: 43:51
- Label: Sony Music
- Producers: Stella Fabiani; Piero Calabrese; Silvia Villevieille Bideri

Marco Mengoni chronology
Re matto live (2010)	Solo 2.0 (2011)	Prontoacorrere (2013)

Singles from Solo 2.0
- 1. "Solo (Vuelta al ruedo)" Released: 1 September 2011; 2. "Tanto il resto cambia" Released: 21 October 2011; 3. "Dall'inferno" Released: 27 January 2012

Solo 2.0 is the debut studio album by Italian singer Marco Mengoni. It was released by Sony Music Italy on 27 September 2011. After debuting at number one on the Italian Albums Chart, the album was certified gold by the Federation of the Italian Music Industry, for domestic sales exceeding 30,000 units.

== Singles ==
The first single from the album, "Solo (Vuelta al ruedo)" was released as a digital download on 1 September 2011, and it was released to mainstream radios on 2 September 2011. The song debuted and peaked at number four on the Italian Singles Chart. The music video for the song, directed by Gianluca "Calu" Montesano, was premiered by MSN Video on 7 September 2011.

"Tanto il resto cambia" was released as the second single from the album on 21 October 2011. The music video for the song was directed by Saku.

On 27 January 2012, "Dall'inferno" was released to mainstream radios as the third single from the album. The music video for the song, directed by Gianluca "Calu" Montesano, was released in March 2012.

== Track listing ==
Solo 2.0 – Standard track listing
No.	Title	Writer(s)	Length
1.	"Solo (Vuelta al ruedo)"	Marco Mengoni; Piero Calabrese; Massimo Calabrese; Stefano Calabrese; Stella Fabiani	4:26
2.	"Un gioco sporco"	Mengoni; P. Calabrese; M. Calabrese; S. Calabrese; Fabiani	3:50
3.	"Tanto il resto cambia"	Mengoni; P. Calabrese; M. Calabrese; S. Calabrese; Fabiani	3:58
4.	"Searching"	Mengoni; P. Calabrese; M. Calabrese; S. Calabrese; Fabiani	3:29
5.	"Uranio 22"	Mengoni; P. Calabrese; M. Calabrese; S. Calabrese; Fabiani	3:23
6.	"Come ti senti"	Mengoni; P. Calabrese; M. Calabrese; S. Calabrese; Fabiani	3:51
7.	"L'equilibrista"	Mengoni; P. Calabrese; M. Calabrese; S. Calabrese; Fabiani	4:10
8.	"Mangialanima"	Paolo Nutini; Jim Duguid; John Fortis; Giuseppe Peveri	3:38
9.	"Un finale diverso"	Giovanni Pellino	3:30
10.	"Tonight"	Mengoni; P. Calabrese; M. Calabrese; S. Calabrese; Eric James Daniel; Fabiani	2:52
11.	"Dall'inferno"	Mengoni; P. Calabrese; M. Calabrese; S. Calabrese; Fabiani	4:01
12.	"Solo (Bolero)"	Mengoni; P. Calabrese; M. Calabrese; S. Calabrese; Fabiani	5:43

Solo 2.0 – iTunes edition bonus track
No.	Title	Length
13.	"Un gioco sporco" (with Cluster)	3:52

== Charts ==
=== Weekly charts ===
Weekly chart performance for Solo 2.0
Chart (2011)	Peak position
Italian Albums (FIMI)	1

=== Year-end charts ===
Year-end chart performance for Solo 2.0
Chart (2011)	Position
Italian Albums (FIMI)	47

== Certifications ==
Region	Certification	Certified units/sales
Italy (FIMI)	Gold	30,000^{*}
^{*} Sales figures based on certification alone.
