= Le cose che non ho =

Studio album by Marco Mengoni
- Released: 4 December 2015
- Genre: Pop
- Label: Sony Music
- Producer: Michele Canova

Marco Mengoni chronology
| Parole in circolo (2015) | Le cose che non ho (2015) | Marco Mengoni Live (2016) |

Singles from Le cose che non ho
- 1. "Ti ho voluto bene veramente" Released: 16 October 2015; 2. "Parole in circolo" Released: 29 January 2016; 3. "Solo due satelliti" Released: 29 April 2016

Le cose che non ho (English: Things I don't have) is the fourth studio album by Italian singer-songwriter Marco Mengoni, released by Sony Music Italy on 4 December 2015.

It was preceded by its lead single "Ti ho voluto bene veramente" (English: I really loved you), released in October 2015. The album served as a follow-up of a two-album project including Mengoni's third full-length record Parole in circolo.

The album peaked at number one on the Italian FIMI albums chart in December 2015. In January 2016, it also became the first topper of the Italian Vinyl Albums Chart, introduced by FIMI during the first week of the year.

== Track listing ==
| No. | Title | Lyrics | Music | Length |
|---|---|---|---|---|
| 1. | "Ricorderai l'amore" | Marco Mengoni; Rory Di Benedetto | Mengoni; Di Benedetto; Rosario Canale; Alfio Roberto Pulitano | 4:01 |
| 2. | "Ti ho voluto bene veramente" | Mengoni; Fortunato Zampaglione | Zampaglione | 2:49 |
| 3. | "Ad occhi chiusi" | Mengoni; Ermal Meta | Mengoni; Meta; Matt Simons; Andrew Allen | 4:10 |
| 4. | "Resti indifferente" | Mengoni; Di Benedetto | Mengoni; Di Benedetto; Canale; Pulitano | 3:11 |
| 5. | "Parole in circolo" | Mengoni; Di Benedetto; Maurizio Musumeci | Mengoni; Di Benedetto; Musumeci | 3:51 |
| 6. | "La nostra estate" | Mengoni; Meta | Mengoni; Dario Faini; Meta | 3:24 |
| 7. | "Solo due satelliti" | Giuliano Sangiorgi | Sangiorgi | 3:35 |
| 8. | "Rock Bottom" | Sia Furler; Chris Braide | Furler; Braide | 3:55 |
| 9. | "Le cose che non ho" | Mengoni; Meta | Mengoni; Meta | 4:04 |
| 10. | "Dove siamo" | Mengoni; Di Benedetto | Mengoni; Di Benedetto; David Gibson; Fred Cox; Jon Mills; Kurtis McKenzie | 3:19 |
| 11. | "Nemmeno un grammo" | Mengoni; Meta; Antonio Filippelli | Mengoni; Meta; Filippelli | 3:16 |

== Personnel ==
- Marco Mengoni – Vocals, Backing vocals, Keyboards, Programming
- Tim Pierce – Acoustic guitar, Electric guitar
- Peter Cornacchia – Electric guitar
- Michele Canova Iorfida – Keyboards, Synth, Programming
- Alex Alessandroni Jr. – Piano, Hammond organ, Fender Rhodes
- Giovanni Pallotti – Bass guitar
- Christian "Noochie" Rigano – Keyboards, Synth, Programming
- Jeff Babko – Piano, Hammond organ, Fender Rhodes
- Sean Hurley – Bass guitar
- Davide Sollazzi – Drums, Piano
- Alessandro De Crescenzo – Electric guitar
- Blair Sinta – Drums
- Francesco Minutello – Trumpet
- Marco Tamburini – Trumpet
- Federico Pierantoni – Trombone
- Roberto Rossi – Trombone
- Mattia Dalla Pozza – Sax

== Charts ==
| Chart (2015) | Peak position |
|---|---|
| Italian Albums (FIMI) | 1 |
| Swiss Albums (Schweizer Hitparade) | 8 |

== Certifications ==
| Region | Certification | Certified units/sales |
|---|---|---|
| Italy (FIMI) | 4× Platinum | 200,000^{*} |
^{*} Sales figures based on certification alone.
