= Frah Quintale =

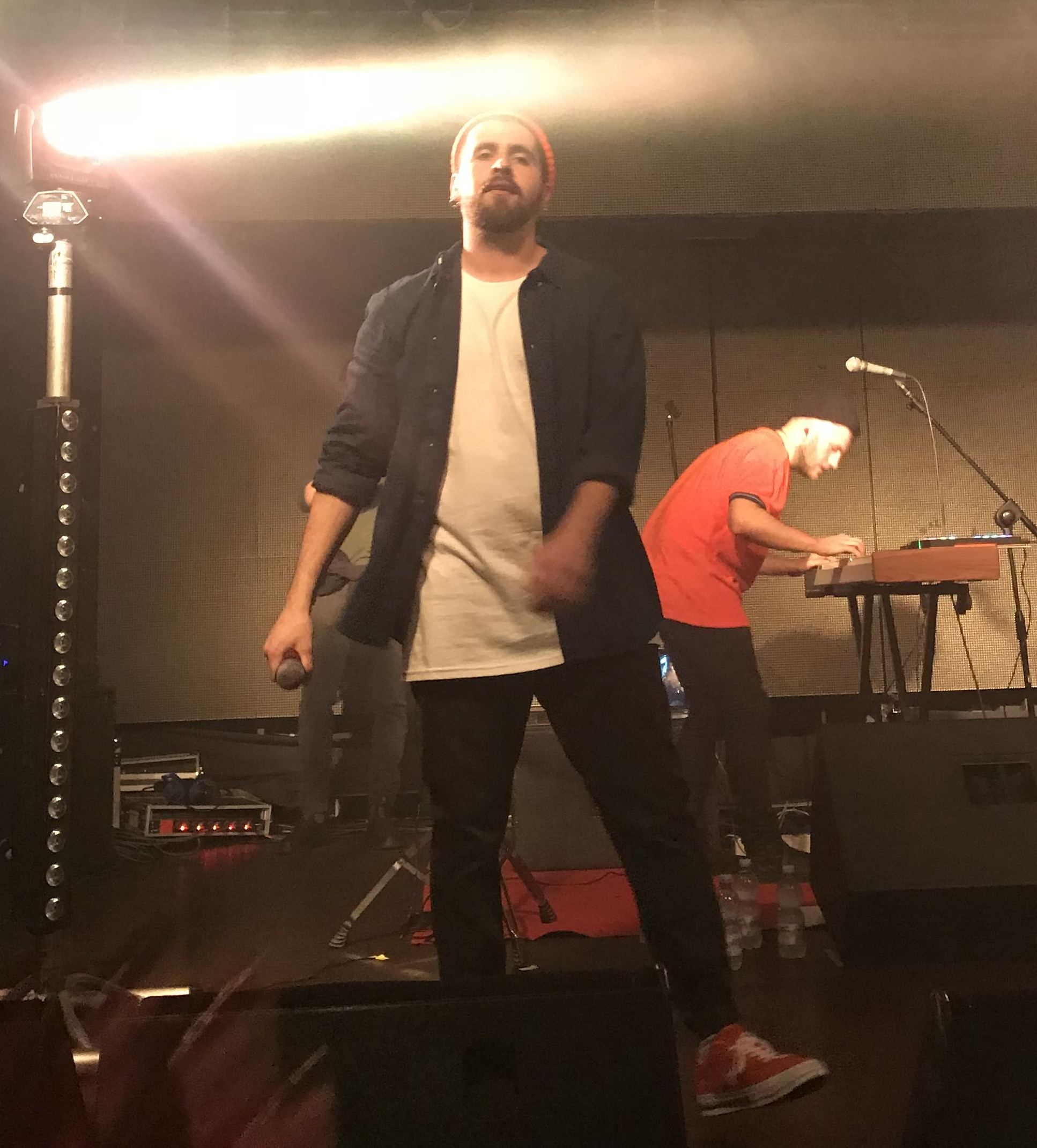
- Frah Quintale performing in Rome (2018)

Background information
- Born: Francesco Servidei; 27 December 1989 (age 36); Brescia, Italy
- Occupations: Singer, songwriter, rapper
- Instrument: Vocals
- Years active: 2006–present
- Label: Undamento

Francesco Servidei (born 27 December 1989), better known as Frah Quintale, is an Italian rapper and singer-songwriter. After debuting with the hip hop duo Fratelli Quintale in 2006, he launched his solo career with independent label Undamento. His first solo album, Regardez moi, was released in 2018, and was certified platinum in Italy.

== Biography ==
Servidei was born in Brescia on 27 December 1989. He grew up in the Urago Mella district, in the northwest suburbs of Brescia. He has two older brothers. During elementary school, his teacher asked Servidei and his classmates to compose a song, as part of a group assignment. This experience led him to develop an interest in writing songs. At the age of 16, he first approached the hip hop culture as a writer. He created graffiti on walls beside the Mella river and on abandoned industrial buildings in his hometown.

In 2006, he formed the duo Fratelli Quintale, together with fellow rapper Mr. Merio. Despite the group name, literally meaning 'Quintal Brothers', Frah and Merio are not brothers in real life. The term 'Quintale' refers to his components weight when they formed the band. After the duo split, Frah decided to keep 'Quintale' as part of his stage name, although he had already lost weight at the time. In 2012, the duo released the album One Hundred as a free download, followed by All You Can Eat in 2013. They later signed a deal with Carosello and released the studio album Tra il bar e la favola, which peaked at number 69 on the FIMI Italian Albums Chart and spawned the singles "Semplice" and "Avrei fermato il tempo".

Frah Quintale's first solo project was the extended play Idiot savant, released as a free download in 2012 and conceived as a side project during his work as part of Fratelli Quintale. His second extended play, titled 2004, was released in 2016 by Undamento. It was followed by the album Regardez mois (2017), later certified platinum by the Federation of the Italian Music Industry. Between 2017 and 2018, he promoted the album touring across Italy, with more than 70 shows. In 2018 he also performed at the International Workers' Day Concert in Rome, and he released the single "Missili", recorded with singer Giorgio Poi and produced by Takagi & Ketra. On 29 June 2018, the project Lungolinea was released. Initially created as a playlist preceding the release of his debut album, Lungolinea evolved to a compilation album featuring previous singles, new songs, and vocal messages originally sent to producers while working on Regardez mois.

Between 2020 and 2021, Frah Quintale released a two-albums project titled Banzai and composed of the records subtitled Lato blu (2020) and Lato arancio (2021). Banzai (Lato blu) was certified Gold by FIMI in 2021. Frah Quintale also appeared in the single "Venere e Marte" by producers Takagi & Ketra and also featuring vocals by Marco Mengoni.
