= Bungaro =

Italian musician and singer

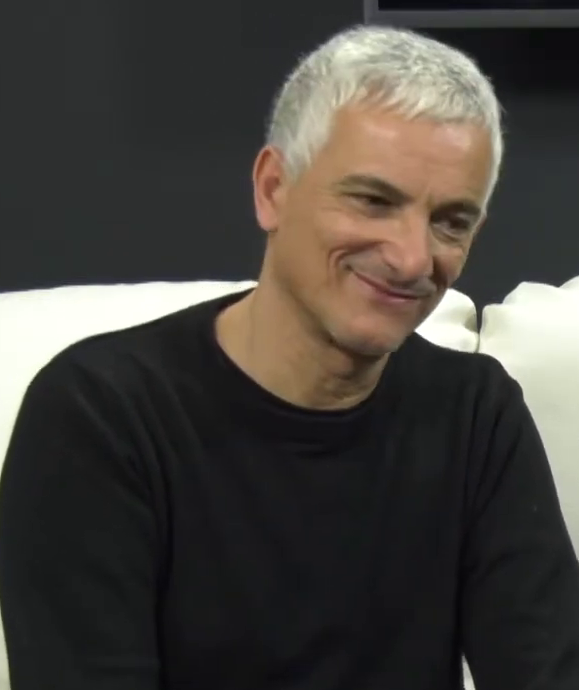

Background information
- Born: Antonio Calò; 23 May 1964 (age 61); Brindisi, Apulia, Italy
- Genres: Pop
- Occupations: Singer-songwriter, composer, lyricist, producer
- Years active: 1988–present
- Labels: RCA Italiana; Sony Music

Antonio Calò (born 23 May 1964), known professionally as Bungaro, is an Italian singer-songwriter.

== Biography ==
He participated twice at the "Newcomers" section of the Sanremo Music Festival in 1988 and 1991, and debuted in the main section at Sanremo 2004 with the song "Guardastelle". In 2010, his album Arte was awarded with the Premio Lunezia.

Together with Ornella Vanoni and Pacifico, he returned at the Sanremo Music Festival 2018 with the song "Imparare ad amarsi". In the 2019 edition, he participated as a guest in a duet with Francesco Renga performing "Aspetto che torni".

== Discography ==
=== Studio albums ===
- Sulla punta della lingua (1988)
- Cantare fa più bene (1990)
- Ci perdiamo in tanti (1992)
- Tutto d'un fiato (1994)
- L'attesa (2004)
- Arte (2009)
- Il valore del momento (2012)

=== Live albums ===
- Maredentro Live (2017)
