= Parole in circolo =

Studio album by Marco Mengoni
- Released: 13 January 2015
- Genre: Pop
- Length: 36:20
- Label: Sony Music
- Producer: Michele Canova

Marco Mengoni chronology
#prontoacorrere (2013)	Parole in circolo (2015)	Le cose che non ho (2015)

Singles from Parole in circolo
- 1. "Guerriero" Released: 21 November 2014; 2. "Esseri umani" Released: 27 February 2015; 3. "Io ti aspetto" Released: 29 May 2015

Parole in circolo (English: "Words in circle") is the third studio album by Italian singer-songwriter Marco Mengoni, released by Sony Music Italy on 13 January 2015. Mengoni also recorded a Spanish version of the album titled Liberando Palabras.

To promote the album, the singer released three singles. The lead single "Guerriero" was released in November 2014, "Esseri umani" in February 2015 and "Io ti aspetto" in May 2015. The album is the first of a two albums project, accompanied with Le cose che non ho.

== Track listing ==
Parole in circolo – Standard track listing
No.	Title	Lyrics	Music	Length
1.	"Guerriero"	Marco Mengoni; Fortunato Zampaglione	Mengoni; Zampaglione; Michele Canova	4:04
2.	"Esseri umani"	Mengoni; Matteo Valicelli	Mengoni; Valicelli	3:32
3.	"Invincibile"	Mengoni; Ermal Meta; Matteo Buzzanca	Mengoni; Meta; Buzzanca	3:27
4.	"Io ti aspetto"	Mengoni; Meta	Mengoni; Meta; Dario Faini; Canova	3:47
5.	"La neve prima che cada"	Mengoni; Meta	Mengoni; Meta; Faini	3:55
6.	"Come un attimo fa"	Mengoni; Norma Jean Martine; Adam Argyle; Martin Brammer	Mengoni; Martine; Argyle; Brammer	3:24
7.	"Ed è per questo"	Mengoni; Zampaglione	Mengoni; Zampaglione	3:34
8.	"Se sei come sei"	Alessandro Raina; Buzzanca	Raina; Buzzanca	3:25
9.	"Se io fossi te"	Luca Carboni	Carboni; Clarence Coffee; Mike Busbee	3:28
10.	"Mai e per sempre"	Mengoni; Valicelli	Mengoni; Valicelli	3:44
Total length:				36:20

Parole in circolo – iTunes edition bonus track
No.	Title	Writer(s)	Length
11.	"Time of My Life"	Martine; Argyle; Brammer	3:23
Total length:			39:43

Parole in circolo – TIM Music edition bonus track
No.	Title	Writer(s)	Length
11.	"For You I Will"	Coffee; Busbee	3:26
Total length:			39:46

Parole in circolo – European edition bonus tracks
No.	Title	Lyrics	Music	Length
11.	"L'essenziale"	Roberto Casalino	Mengoni; Casalino; Francesco De Benedittis	3:38
12.	"Ricorderai l'amore (Remember the Love)" (with Mandy Capristo)	Mengoni; Rory Di Benedetto	Mengoni; Di Benedetto	3:58
13.	"Onde"	Mengoni; Niccolò Contessa	Mengoni; Contessa; Canova	3:22
14.	"Ad occhi chiusi (Light in You)" (with Paloma Faith)	Mengoni; Meta; Matt Simons; Andrew Allen	Mengoni; Meta; Simons; Allen	4:11
15.	"Sai che"	Mengoni; Zampaglione	Mengoni; Zampaglione; Canova	4:29
Total length:				53:58

== Personnel ==
- Marco Mengoni — Vocals, Choirs

Additional personnel

- Tim Pierce — Guitar
- Alessandro de Crescenzo — Guitar
- Sean Hurley — Bass guitar
- Giovanni Pallotti — Bass guitar
- Jeff Babko — Piano, Hammond organ, Fender Rhodes
- Michele Canova Iorfida — Keyboards, Programming
- Christian "Noochie" Rigano — Keyboards, Synthesizer, Programming
- Blair Sinta — Drums
- Marco Tamburini — Trumpet
- Roberto Rossi — Trombone

== Charts ==
Chart (2015)	Peak position
Italian Albums (FIMI)	1
Swiss Albums (Schweizer Hitparade)	14

== Certifications ==
Region	Certification	Certified units/sales
Italy (FIMI)	4× Platinum	200,000^{‡}
^{‡} Sales+streaming figures based on certification alone.
