= Guerriero (song) =

Single by Marco Mengoni

from the album Parole in circolo
- Released: 21 November 2014
- Genre: Pop; electropop
- Length: 4:05
- Label: Sony Music Entertainment
- Songwriters: Marco Mengoni; Fortunato Zampaglione
- Producer: Michele Canova

Marco Mengoni singles chronology
"La valle dei re" (2014)	"Guerriero" (2014)	"Esseri umani" (2015)

Guerriero ("Warrior") is a song co-written and recorded by Italian singer Marco Mengoni. It was released on 21 November 2014 as the lead single from his third studio album Parole in circolo.

The song was written by Marco Mengoni with co-writing contribution by Fortunato Zampaglione and produced by Michele Canova.

It peaked at number one on the Italian FIMI Top Digital Downloads charts and it was certified four times platinum for domestic downloads exceeding 200,000 units.

== Music video ==
The music video for the song was directed by Cosimo Alemà and was shot in Trentino in collaboration with Trentino Film Commission, Trentino Sviluppo and the municipality of Trento. The video stars Matteo Valentini, along with Marco Mengoni.

== Track listing ==
Digital download – single
No.	Title	Length
1.	"Guerriero"	4:04

Digital download – album
No.	Title	Length
1.	"Guerriero"	4:04

== Charts ==
Chart (2014)	Peak position
Croatia (HRT)	93
Italy (FIMI)	1

== Certifications ==
Region	Certification	Certified units/sales
Italy (FIMI)	6× Platinum	300,000^{‡}
^{‡} Sales+streaming figures based on certification alone.
