= Tony Maiello =

Italian singer-songwriter (born 1989)

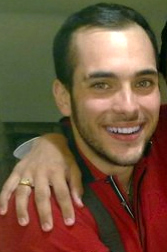
- Maiello in 2011

Background information
- Born: Antonio Maiello; 15 March 1989 (age 37); Castellamare di Stabia, Campania, Italy
- Genres: Pop
- Occupation: Singer-songwriter
- Instrument: Vocals
- Years active: 2008–present

Antonio Maiello (born 15 March 1989), known professionally as Tony Maiello, is an Italian singer-songwriter. In 2008 he competed in the first series of X Factor, placing fourth in the final of the show. In 2010 he won the Newcomers' section of the 60th Sanremo Music Festival, with his entry "Il linguaggio della resa". The song, released as a single under his former X Factor coach Mara Maionchi's label Non ho l'età, reached the top twenty on the Italian FIMI singles chart.

Maiello later started writing songs for several other artists. As a composer and lyricist, he penned hits including Laura Pausini's "200 note" (2015), Pausini and Biagio Antonacci's "Il coraggio di andare" (2018), Giorgia and Marco Mengoni's "Come neve" (2018), Mengoni's "Muhammad Ali" (2019), and Mengoni and Madame's "Mi fiderò" (2021).

In 2025, Maiello was a contestant of Tale e quale show, the Italian edition of Your Face Sounds Familiar, finishing in first place during the final of the competition.
