= Ti ho voluto bene veramente =

Single by Marco Mengoni

from the album Le cose che non ho
- Released: 16 October 2015
- Recorded: 2014–2015
- Genre: Pop; ballad
- Length: 2:49
- Label: Sony Music Entertainment
- Songwriters: Marco Mengoni; Fortunato Zampaglione
- Producer: Michele Canova

Marco Mengoni singles chronology
"Io ti aspetto" (2015)	"Ti ho voluto bene veramente" (2015)	"Parole in circolo" (2016)

Music video
- "Ti ho voluto bene veramente" on YouTube

Ti ho voluto bene veramente (English: I really loved you) is a song co-written and recorded by Italian singer Marco Mengoni. It was released by Sony Music on 16 October 2015 as the lead single from his fourth studio album Le cose che non ho.

The song, written by the singer himself with co-writing contribution by Fortunato Zampaglione, was produced by Michele Canova. It peaked at number one on the Italian FIMI Top Digital Downloads charts.

== Music video ==
The music video for the song was directed by Niccolò Celaia and Antonio Usbergo, and was shot in Iceland.

== Track listing ==
Digital download – single
No.	Title	Length
1.	"Ti ho voluto bene veramente"	2:49

Digital download – album
No.	Title	Length
1.	"Ti ho voluto bene veramente"	2:49

== Certifications ==
Region	Certification	Certified units/sales
Italy (FIMI)	5× Platinum	250,000^{‡}
^{‡} Sales+streaming figures based on certification alone.
