= Materia (Prisma) =

Studio album by Marco Mengoni
- Released: 26 May 2023
- Genre: R&B; pop; soul; gospel; blues
- Length: 31:56
- Label: Sony Music
- Producer: Benjamin Ventura; Clap! Clap!; Crookers; Davide Simonetta; E.D.D.; Eshla; Federico Nardelli; FLIM; Francesck Fugazza; Katoo; Marz; Massimo Colagiovanni; MDM; Pierfrancesco Pasini; Zef

Marco Mengoni chronology
Materia (Pelle) (2022)	Materia (Prisma) (2023)

Singles from Materia (Prisma)
- 1. "Due vite" Released: 8 February 2023; 2. "Pazza musica" Released: 26 May 2023; 3. "Un'altra storia" Released: 22 September 2023

Materia (Prisma) (transl. Material: Prism) is the eighth studio album by Italian singer-songwriter Marco Mengoni, released by Sony Music Italy on 26 May 2023 as the final installment of the trilogy, Materia, consisting of three separately-released chapters: Terra, Pelle, and Prisma.

Each part revolves around one of the album's central themes of Mengoni's personal musical journey throughout his career. Lyrically, Prisma is about the artist's self-reflection and musically the album is primarily a pop and R&B record that features soul, gospel and blues influences.

The album peaked at number one of the Italian Albums Chart, becoming his sixth album to top the chart. The album's lead single "Due vite" won the Sanremo Music Festival 2023 and competed during the Eurovision Song Contest 2023, where it placed fourth, winning the Marcel Bezençon Awards for its musical composition.

== Background and development ==
The album is the final chapter of the Materia trilogy. While Terra draws inspiration from Mengoni's musical roots and early influences, Pelle focused on the artist's musical experiments, and the content on Prisma is centered around his self-reflection and self-assessment. Prisma sees the unification of the previous chapters with new recording material. Consisting of ten tracks Mengoni states, "I think Marco and Mengoni are inseparable and I think it is clear that the person on and off the stage is the same after all. The record displays all the feelings I'm feeling right now e.g. despite its freshness, there's anger but also passion for life [...] It's inspired by events in my life and explores the different facets of living in a society, the good and the bad. It's about different emotions hence the title "Prism", an element that breaks up light into all these different spectral colors.

== Title and artwork ==
About the title of the album, Mengoni explained, "Prism has the ability to compose light and display the colors that make it up. They say it's physics, for me, it's pure magic. Human is like a prism, he has the ability to absorb experiences, filter them, and break them down to analyze every possibility and every meaning."

== Critical reception ==
Luca Trambusti of Rockol described the album "the most convincing and the best executed" of the trilogy, with "inclination toward black music and blends the elements in perfect balance and harmonious". Even if Trambust noted a "strong production", the "authorial and especially the textual part is enhanced", describing the lyrics "intelligent, nontrivial". Gabriele Fazio of Agenzia Giornalistica Italia considered that the album, compared to the previous two chapters in which he recognizes Materia (Terra) as the most successful, "lives more of the need to say something, to launch messages" in which Mengoni produces a "refined pop, very contemporary; [...] imbued with meaningful and welcoming words."

Andrea Conti of Il Fatto Quotidiano defined the project as "political, full of anger but also of hope for the future" in which Mengoni is "more direct" as he "exposes his thoughts without frills and laying bare his feelings." Silvia Gianatti of Vanity Fair Italia described the album musically with inspiration ranging "from soul to electronica" through eleven tracks in which he also manages "to show a newfound lightness, the result of a growth and awareness acquired in these years of career" and to draw "attention to the themes that have always been important to him, the battle for rights, inclusion, love".

== Track listing ==
Materia (Prisma) – Standard track listing
No.	Title	Writer(s)	Producer(s)	Length
1.	"Due vite"	Marco Mengoni; Davide Petrella; Davide Simonetta	E.D.D.; Simonetta	3:45
2.	"Fiori d'orgoglio" (featuring Ernia)	Mengoni; Matteo Professione; Raffaele Esposito	E.D.D.; Marz; Zef	3:16
3.	"Pazza musica" (with Elodie)	Petrella; Paolo Antonacci; Simonetta; Stefano Tognini	E.D.D.; Simonetta; Zef	3:14
4.	"Incenso"	Francesco Fugazza; Enrico Botta; Vincenzo Colella; Pierfrancesco Pasini; Dario Schittone; Leonardo Zaccaria	Fugazza; Pasini; E.D.D.; Estremo	3:17
5.	"Un'altra storia"	Federico Bertollini; Petrella; Francesco Catitti	E.D.D.; Katoo; Benjamin Ventura	3:21
6.	"Appunto 5: Non sono questo"	Daniele Magro	E.D.D.; Eshla; Fugazza	2:23
7.	"In tempo"	Mengoni; Fabio Ilacqua	Crookers; FLIM	2:41
8.	"The Damned of the Earth"	Mengoni; Ilacqua	FLIM; Clap! Clap!	3:13
9.	"Lasciamo indietro" (featuring Jeson)	Mengoni; Cristiano Crisci; Daniele Fossatelli; Ainè Santoro	Massimo Colagiovanni; E.D.D.; MDM	3:46
10.	"Due nuvole"	Edoardo D'Erme; Marta Venturini	E.D.D.; Federico Nardelli	3:00
Total length:				31:56

Materia (Prisma) – Streaming edition bonus track
No.	Title	Writer(s)	Producer(s)	Length
3.	"Un'altra storia" (featuring Franco126)	Bertollini; Petrella; Catitti	E.D.D.; Katoo; Ventura	3:21
11.	"Let It Be" (with The Kingdom Choir)	John Lennon; Paul McCartney	E.D.D.	3:49
12.	"Due nuvole" (featuring Ariete)	D'Erme; Venturini	E.D.D.; Nardelli	3:00
Total length:				35:45

== Charts ==
=== Weekly charts ===
Weekly chart performance for Materia (Prisma)
Chart (2023)	Peak position
Italian Albums (FIMI)	1
Swiss Albums (Schweizer Hitparade)	4

=== Year-end charts ===
2023 year-end chart performance for Materia (Prisma)
Chart (2023)	Position
Italian Albums (FIMI)	5

2024 year-end chart performance for Materia (Prisma)
Chart (2024)	Position
Italian Albums (FIMI)	36
