= In un giorno qualunque =

Single by Marco Mengoni

from the EP Re matto
- Released: 1 October 2010
- Recorded: 2010
- Genre: Pop soul
- Length: 3:59
- Label: Sony Music
- Songwriters: Marco Mengoni; Piero Calabrese

Marco Mengoni singles chronology
"Stanco (Deeper Inside)" (2010)	"In un giorno qualunque" (2010)	"Solo (Vuelta al ruedo)" (2011)

"In un giorno qualunque" (meaning "On an ordinary day" in Italian) is a song co-written and recorded by Italian singer Marco Mengoni. It was released on 1 October 2010 by Sony Music as the third and final single from his second extended play Re matto.

The song was written by Mengoni with co-writing contribution by Piero Calabrese. It peaked at number 5 on the Italian Singles Chart. It was also certified platinum by the Federation of the Italian Music Industry for domestic downloads exceeding 30,000 units.

== Music video ==
A music video to accompany the release of "In un giorno qualunque" was first released onto YouTube on 18 November 2010 at a total length of three minutes and fifty-one seconds.

== Track listing ==
Digital download
No.	Title	Writer(s)	Length
1.	"In un giorno qualunque"	P. Calabrese, Mengoni	3:59

== Chart performance ==
Weekly chart performance for "In un giorno qualunque"
Chart (2010–11)	Peak position
Italy (FIMI)	5

Annual chart rankings for "In un giorno qualunque"
Chart (2011)	Rank
Italy (Musica e dischi)	63

== Release history ==
Street dates for "In un giorno qualunque"
Region	Date	Format	Label
Italy	1 October 2010	Digital download	Sony Music Entertainment
