= Credimi ancora =

Single by Marco Mengoni

from the EP Re matto
- Released: 17 February 2010
- Recorded: 2010
- Genre: Progressive rock
- Length: 3:58
- Label: Sony Music
- Songwriters: Marco Mengoni; Stella Fabiani; Piero Calabrese; Massimo Calabrese

Marco Mengoni singles chronology
"Dove si vola" (2009)	"Credimi ancora" (2010)	"Stanco (Deeper Inside)" (2010)

"Credimi ancora" (pronounced [ˈkreːdimi aŋˈkoːra]; Italian for "Believe me again") is a song co-written and recorded by Italian singer Marco Mengoni. It was released on 17 February 2010 by Sony Music as the lead single from his second extended play Re matto.

The song competeded during the Sanremo Music Festival 2010, placing third in the final rank. It was written by Marco Mengoni, Stella Fabiani, Piero Calabrese and Massimo Calabrese. The song peaked to number 3 on the Italian Singles Chart. It was also certified platinum by the Federation of the Italian Music Industry for domestic downloads exceeding 30,000 units.

== Music video ==
A music video to accompany the release of "Credimi ancora" was first released onto YouTube on 18 March 2011 at a total length of three minutes and twenty-eight seconds. The video was directed by Gaetano Morbioli.

== Track listing ==
Digital download
No.	Title	Writer(s)	Length
1.	"Credimi ancora"	Mengoni, Stella Fabiani, Piero Calabrese, Massimo Calabrese	3:27

== Charts ==
=== Weekly charts ===
Chart (2010)	Peak position
Italy (FIMI)	3

=== Year-end charts ===
Chart (2010)	Peak position
Italy Airplay (EarOne)	61

== Release history ==
Region	Date	Format	Label
Italy	17 February 2010	Digital download	Sony Music Entertainment
