= Marco Mengoni =

Italian singer (born 1988)

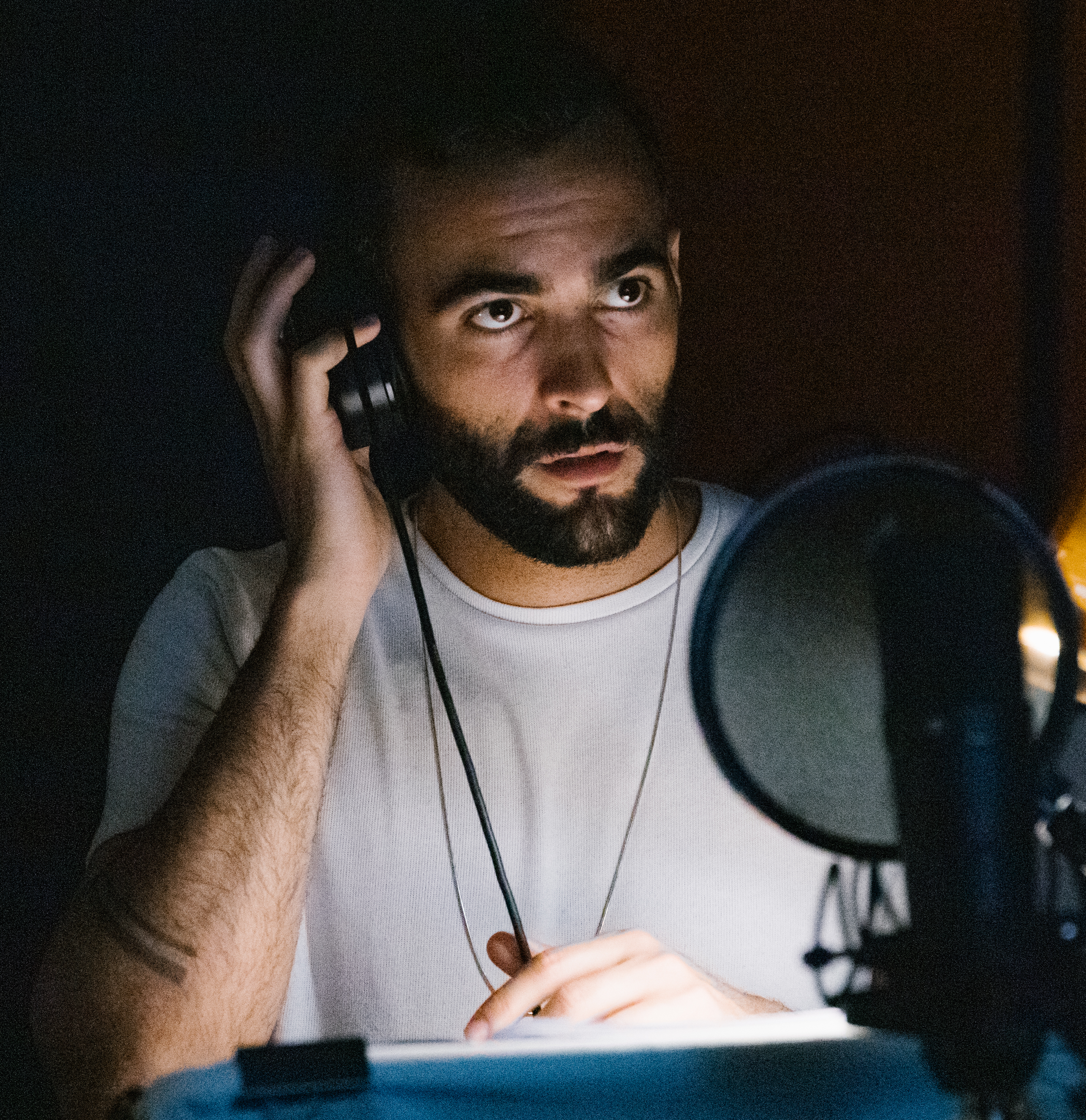
- Mengoni in 2019

Background information
- Born: 25 December 1988 (age 37); Ronciglione, Viterbo, Italy
- Genres: Pop; soul; rock; R&B
- Occupations: Singer; songwriter
- Instruments: Vocals; piano; guitar
- Works: Marco Mengoni discography
- Years active: 2009–present
- Label: Sony Music
- Website: marcomengoni.it

Marco Mengoni (Italian: [ˈmarko meŋˈɡoːni]; born 25 December 1988) is an Italian singer-songwriter who rose to fame in 2009 after winning the third season of the Italian talent show X Factor. Since then he has sold over 2.8 million records in Italy, peaking the Italian albums chart seven consecutive times and entering the Top 10 Italian Singles Chart fifteen times. He won the Sanremo Music Festival in 2013 and again in 2023, therefore representing Italy in the Eurovision Song Contest in both years.

His 2009 debut extended play, Dove si vola, was preceded by the single with the same title, which reached the top spot of the Italian Top Digital Downloads chart and also served as his coronation song. In February 2010, Mengoni competed in the 60th Sanremo Music Festival with the song "Credimi ancora", placing third among fifteen contestant. The song was included in his second extended play, Re matto, which debuted at number one in Italy. The EP was promoted through an Italian tour, which yielded the live album Re matto live. Mengoni's first full-length studio album, Solo 2.0, was released in September 2010 and was certified gold by the Federation of the Italian Music Industry.

In 2013, Mengoni won the 63rd Sanremo Music Festival with his song "L'essenziale"; he was then internally selected by RAI to represent Italy in the Eurovision Song Contest 2013 in Malmö with the song. "L'essenziale" also became the lead single of the album Prontoacorrere, which became his fourth number-one on the Italian albums chart. In 2015, Mengoni released the albums Parole in circolo and Le cose che non ho, which were part of the same artistic project, also including the live record Marco Mengoni Live, all of them reaching the number one of Italian albums chart. After the 2017 collaboration "Come neve" with Italian singer Giorgia, he published his seventh consecutive number-one album Atlantico in 2018. In 2023, ten years after his first victory, he won the 73rd Sanremo Music Festival with "Due vite", earning him the right to represent Italy again in the Eurovision Song Contest, this time in Liverpool.

During his career, Mengoni has received several awards, including a Nastro d'Argento, two TRL Awards, nine Wind Music Awards, nine MTV Italian Music Awards and a Nickelodeon Kid's Choice Awards. In 2010 and 2015, he won the MTV Europe Music Award for Best European Act, becoming the first Italian artist to win that prize. In 2013, he also won the MTV Europe Music Award for Best Southern European Act.

== Early life ==
Marco Mengoni was born on 25 December 1988 in Ronciglione, a comune in the province of Viterbo in central Italy, where he also spent his youth. He is the only child of Nadia Ferrari (1958/1964 – 2024) and Maurizio Mengoni. At the age of 14, while studying industrial design at secondary school, he started to take singing lessons. Mengoni later started to perform as a member of a five-piece vocal group. After leaving school, he moved to Rome, where he enrolled in a degree in Languages. During his studies, he occasionally worked as a barman and he performed in piano bars and during weddings. During the same years, he had his first experience in the recorded music business, working as a sound mixer and as a music programmer.

== Career ==
=== 2009: X Factor and Dove si vola ===
Mengoni auditioned for the third series of the Italian talent-show X Factor in 2009, performing a cover of Eduardo De Crescenzo's "Uomini semplici". The category he was part of, "16–24s", was mentored by Morgan, who chose Mengoni as one of his top four contestants that progressed to the live shows. During the live shows, he performed songs from a wide range of genres, receiving the congratulations and admiration of popular Italian singers such as Mina, Giorgia, Elisa, and Adriano Celentano. On 2 December 2009, Mengoni was announced the winner of the competition, receiving a recording contract with a stated value of €300,000 and being automatically selected as one of the participants to the Sanremo Music Festival 2010.

Mengoni's winning single, "Dove si vola", debuted at number one on the Italian Top Digital Downloads chart, and it was included in the extended play with the same title, released on 4 December 2009. The EP, also including the original song "Lontanissimo da te" and five studio recordings of covers he had previously performed during the TV show, peaked at number nine on the Italian albums chart and was certified platinum by the Federation of the Italian Music Industry.

X Factor series 3 performances and results
Episode	Theme	Song choice	Original artist	R/O	Result
Audition	Auditioner's Choice	"Uomini semplici"	Eduardo De Crescenzo	—N/a	Advanced
Bootcamp	Auditioner's Choice	"La luce dell'est"	Lucio Battisti	—N/a	Advanced
Bootcamp	Auditioner's Choice	"We Can Work It Out"	The Beatles	—N/a	Advanced
Bootcamp	Auditioner's Choice	"(You Make Me Feel Like) A Natural Woman"	Aretha Franklin	—N/a	Advanced
Bootcamp	Auditioner's Choice	"I'm Outta Love"	Anastacia	—N/a	Advanced
Live Show 1	Mentor's Choice	"Man in the Mirror"	Michael Jackson	5	Safe
Live Show 2	Mentor's Choice	"L'amore si odia"	Noemi feat. Fiorella Mannoia	2	Safe
Live Show 3	1980s in music	"Notorious"	Duran Duran	1	Safe
Live Show 4	Mentor's Choice	"Psycho Killer"	Talking Heads	6	Safe
Live Show 5	Mentor's Choice	"My Baby Just Cares for Me"	Nina Simone	4	Safe
Live Show 6	Mentor's Choice	"Ashes to Ashes"	David Bowie	5	Safe
Live Show 7	Mentor's Choice	"Helter Skelter"	The Beatles	3	Safe
Live Show 8	Mentor's Choice	"Insieme a te sto bene"	Lucio Battisti	2	Safe
Live Show 8	Acappella Songs	"L'appuntamento"	Ornella Vanoni	12	Safe
Live Show 9	Sanremo Music Festival	"Almeno tu nell'universo"	Mia Martini	6	Safe
Live Show 10	Italian-language Songs	"Onda su onda"	Bruno Lauzi	1	Safe
Live Show 10	Michael Jackson	"Billie Jean"	Michael Jackson	11	Safe
Live Show 11	Mentor's Choice	"Kiss"	Prince and The Revolution	5	Safe
Live Show 11	Mentor's Choice	"Il nostro concerto"	Umberto Bindi	6	Safe
Live Show 12	Mentor's Choice	"Back in Black"	AC/DC	4	Safe
Live Show 12	Acappella Songs	"Senza fine"	Gino Paoli	5	Safe
Live Show 12	Winner's Song	"Dove si vola"	Marco Mengoni	12	Safe
Final	Celebrity Duets	"Oggi sono io" (with Alex Britti)	Alex Britti	3	Safe
Final	Mentor's Choice	"Amore assurdo"	Morgan	5	Safe
Final	Winner's Song	"Dove si vola"	Marco Mengoni	7	Safe
Final	Medley	"Psycho Killer", "My Baby Just Cares for Me", "Almeno tu nell'universo"	Talking Heads, Nina Simone, Mia Martini	10	Winner
Final	Acappella Song	"The Fool on the Hill"	The Beatles	12	Winner

=== 2010: Sanremo Music Festival and Re matto ===
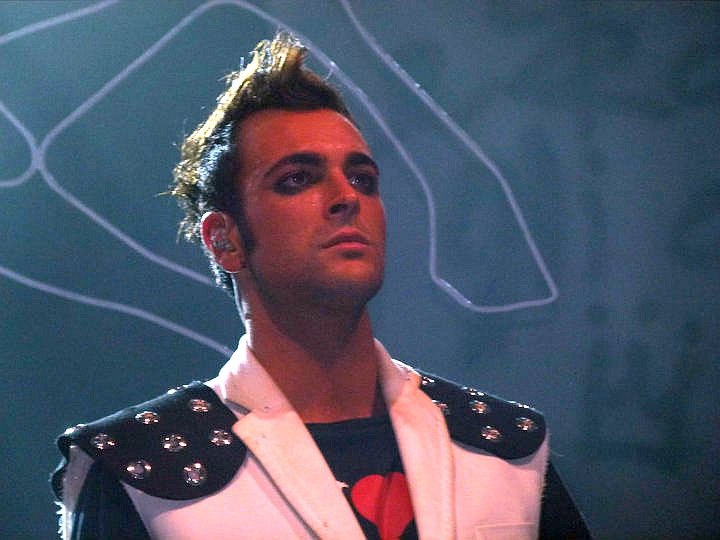
Mengoni during a concert in 2010

In February 2010, Mengoni competed in the Big Artists section of the 60th Sanremo Music Festival, placing third with the song "Credimi ancora". After being released as a single, "Credimi ancora" peaked at number three in Italy, and it was certified platinum by the Federation of the Italian Music Industry. The song was also included in Mengoni's second EP, Re matto, released on 17 February 2010. The EP held the top spot of the Italian Albums Chart for four consecutive weeks, and it also spawned the singles "Stanco (Deeper Inside)" and "In un giorno qualunque".

The EP was also promoted through Mengoni's first concert tour, Re matto live, which debuted in Milan on 3 May 2010 and consisted of 56 two-hours shows, including choreographies by Luca Tommassini and featuring songs from his previous studio records, as well as covers such as "Live and Let Die", "(I Can't Get No) Satisfaction", "Mad World", "Proud Mary" and "Tears in Heaven". A live album and video album was recorded during the tour. Titled Re matto live, it was released on 19 October 2010, and it debuted and peaked atop the Italian Albums Chart, later being certified platinum by the Federation of the Italian Music Industry.

During the same year, Mengoni received the TRL award for Man of the Year. After being voted Best Italian Act at the MTV Europe Music Awards 2010, he also won the award for Best European Act, becoming the first Italian artist to receive the prize.

=== 2011–2012: Solo 2.0 ===
On 2 September 2011, Mengoni released the single "Solo (Vuelta al ruedo)", preceding his first full-length studio album, Solo 2.0. Mengoni co-wrote most of the songs on the album, working with composers including Italian singers-songwriters Neffa and Dente. Influenced by electronic and rock music, the album also includes tracks featuring the Italian a cappella group Cluster and the orchestra directed by Fabio Gurian. Released on 27 September 2011, Solo 2.0 debuted at number one on the Italian Albums Chart, and it was certified gold for domestic sales exceeding 30,000 units. On 21 October 2011, "Tanto il resto cambia" was released as the album's second single, while the third single, "Dall'inferno", was released to Italian radio stations on 27 January 2013.

In 2011, Mengoni also appeared on Lucio Dalla's compilation album Questo amore, duetting with him on a new version of the hit "Meri Luis", and on Renato Zero's video album Sei Zero, performing "Per non essere così". To promote his first full-length album, Mengoni embarked on an Italian tour, the Solo tour 2.0, which debuted on 26 November 2011 in Milan. In April 2012, a second leg of the tour started. Taking place in Italian theatres, it was created by Mengoni with Andrea Rigonat and Italian singer Elisa.

=== 2013–2014: Sanremo Music Festival, #prontoacorrere and Eurovision Song Contest ===
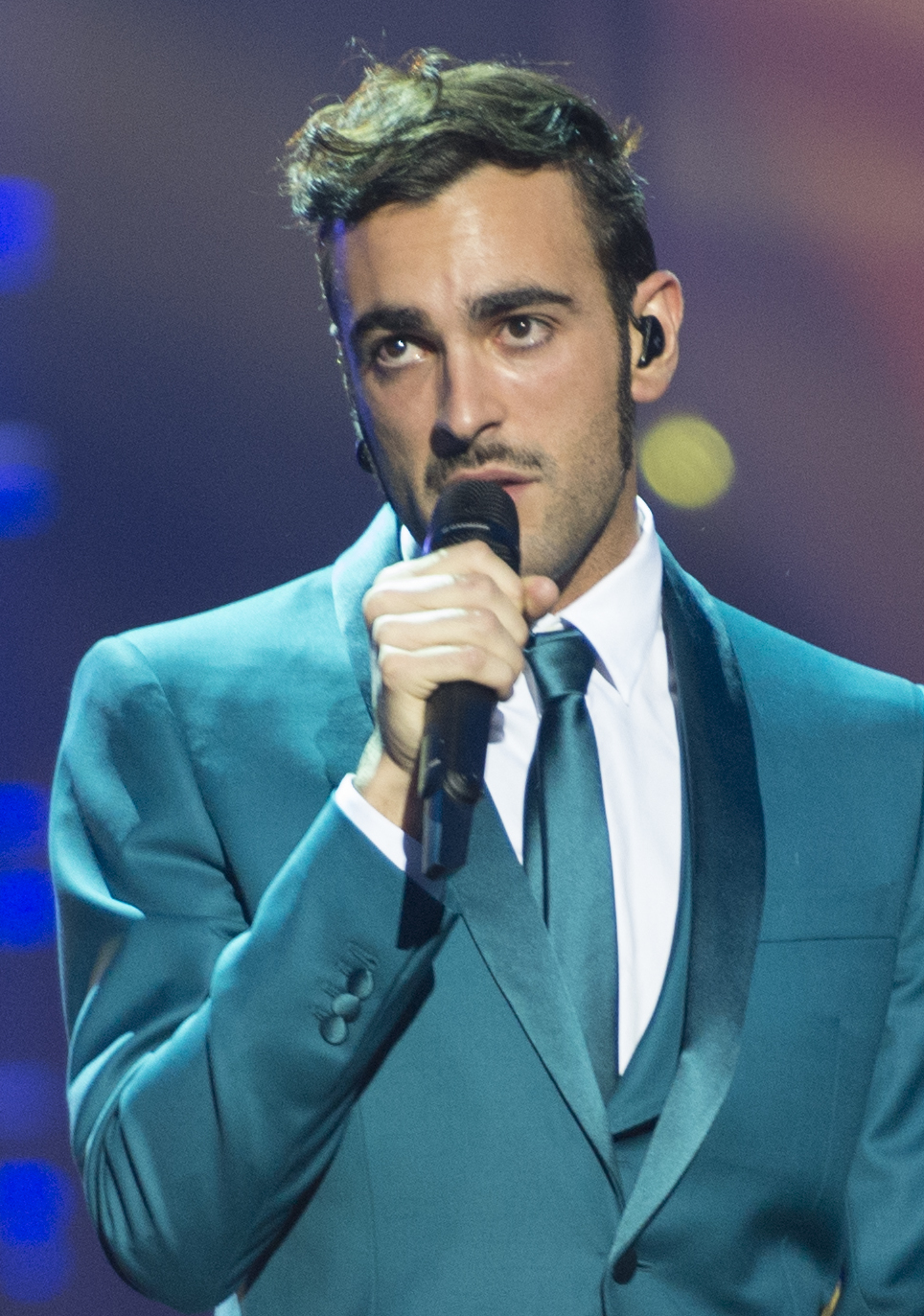
Mengoni performing at the Eurovision Song Contest 2013

After moving to Milan, in February 2013 Mengoni competed in the 63rd Sanremo Music Festival with the songs "L'essenziale" and "Bellissimo", the latter written by Gianna Nannini. On 12 February 2013, "L'essenziale" won against "Bellissimo" as the song to be performed by Mengoni during the next stages of the competition. During the fourth night, he also performed a cover of Luigi Tenco's "Ciao amore, ciao". On 16 February 2013, Mengoni was announced the winner of the competition. During the same night, an internal jury also chose Mengoni among the other participants to the competition as the Italian entry in the Eurovision Song Contest 2013.

A shortened version of "L'essenziale" was later chosen as the song to be performed during the Eurovision Song Contest. As part of the "Big Five", Mengoni automatically qualified for the final of the competition, held in Malmö, Sweden, on 18 May 2013. Mengoni finished seventh in a field of 26, receiving 126 points.

After being released as a single, "L'essenziale" debuted at number one on the Italian Digital Downloads chart, holding the top spot for a total of eight consecutive weeks and being certified multi-platinum. Both "L'essenziale" and "Bellissimo" were included in Mengoni's second studio album, #prontoacorrere, produced by Michele Canova and released in Italy on 19 March 2013. The album, which features songs written by artists such as Mark Owen, Gianna Nannini, Ivano Fossati and Cesare Cremonini, debuted at number one in Italy, and it was certified platinum by the Federation of the Italian Music Industry. The following singles from the album, "Pronto a correre" and "Non passerai", were released in Italy on 19 April and on 23 August 2013, respectively, and they both entered the top-ten in Mengoni's home country.

In July 2014, Mengoni said that his Eurovision experience left him "a little astonished" and that he would compete again "without a second thought."

=== 2015–2016: Parole in circolo and Le cose che non ho ===
In January 2015, Mengoni released his third studio album, Parole in circolo, the first part of a "two-chapters" project. The album was preceded by the single "Guerriero", released in November 2014. The second part of this project, which consisted in the album Le cose che non ho, was released in December 2015.

After being voted Best Italian Act at the MTV Europe Music Awards 2015, he also won the award for Best European Act for the second time. The closing part of this artistic project was the live album Marco Mengoni Live, released in October 2016. The album also featured six studio tracks, including the single "Sai che" and a duet with English singer Paloma Faith, which recorded the track "Ad occhi chiusi (Light in You)".

=== 2018–present: Atlantico, Materia trilogy, return to Sanremo and Eurovision ===
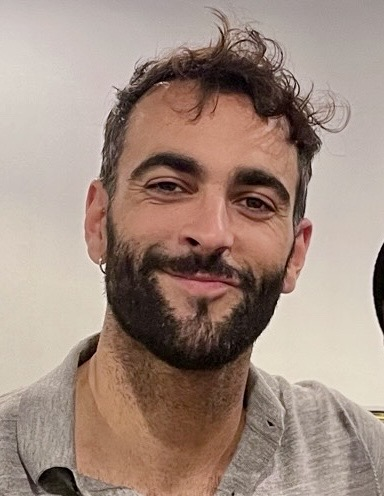
Mengoni in 2021

On 19 October 2018, Mengoni published the singles "Voglio" and "Buona vita" at the same time, which anticipated the fifth studio album Atlantico, published on 30 November. On 30 November released the third single "Hola (I Say)", in collaboration with Tom Walker. On 5 April 2019, he released the fourth single "Muhammad Ali". The album is available in both Italian and Spanish.

In early 2021, Mengoni returned with "Venere e Marte", a song featuring Takagi & Ketra and Frah Quintale. In the summer of that year he presented the new single "Ma stasera", produced by Purple Disco Machine. The single preceded the sixth studio album Materia (Terra), which was released in December 2021. The album is designed as a trilogy, with the second part Materia (Pelle) released in October 2022. He participated in and won the Sanremo Music Festival 2023 with the song "Due vite", earning him the right to represent Italy again in the Eurovision Song Contest 2023 in Liverpool. In an interview on TG1 following his win, Mengoni stated that he may choose a different song other than "Due vite" to compete in Eurovision; the song was later confirmed to remain as Mengoni's Eurovision 2023 entry. In the final, Mengoni ultimately placed fourth, with a score of 350 points.

=== 2024–present: return to Sanremo and new album ===
As the latest Sanremo winner (at the time), he was invited to co-host the first night of the 2024 festival alongside Amadeus. His 11th studio album, "Felice sì, ma tutto sbagliato", is announced for release on December 11, 2026 with lead single, "Giornate perse" ("Wasted Days"). The phrase describes a bittersweet psychological state or a poignant paradox that literally translates to "Happy, yes, but everything is wrong." It forms the central theme of Marco Mengoni's album and his upcoming Milan concert residency, titled Allo Sbagliato ("At the Wrong Place").

== Musical style and influences ==
Generally referred to as a pop artist, according to Il Corriere della Sera's Luca Benedetti, Mengoni has a typically soul voice, with pop rock tones.

Mengoni credits The Beatles as a major inspiration. His other main influences include David Bowie, George Michael, Freddie Mercury, Michael Jackson, and Renato Zero.

== Discography ==
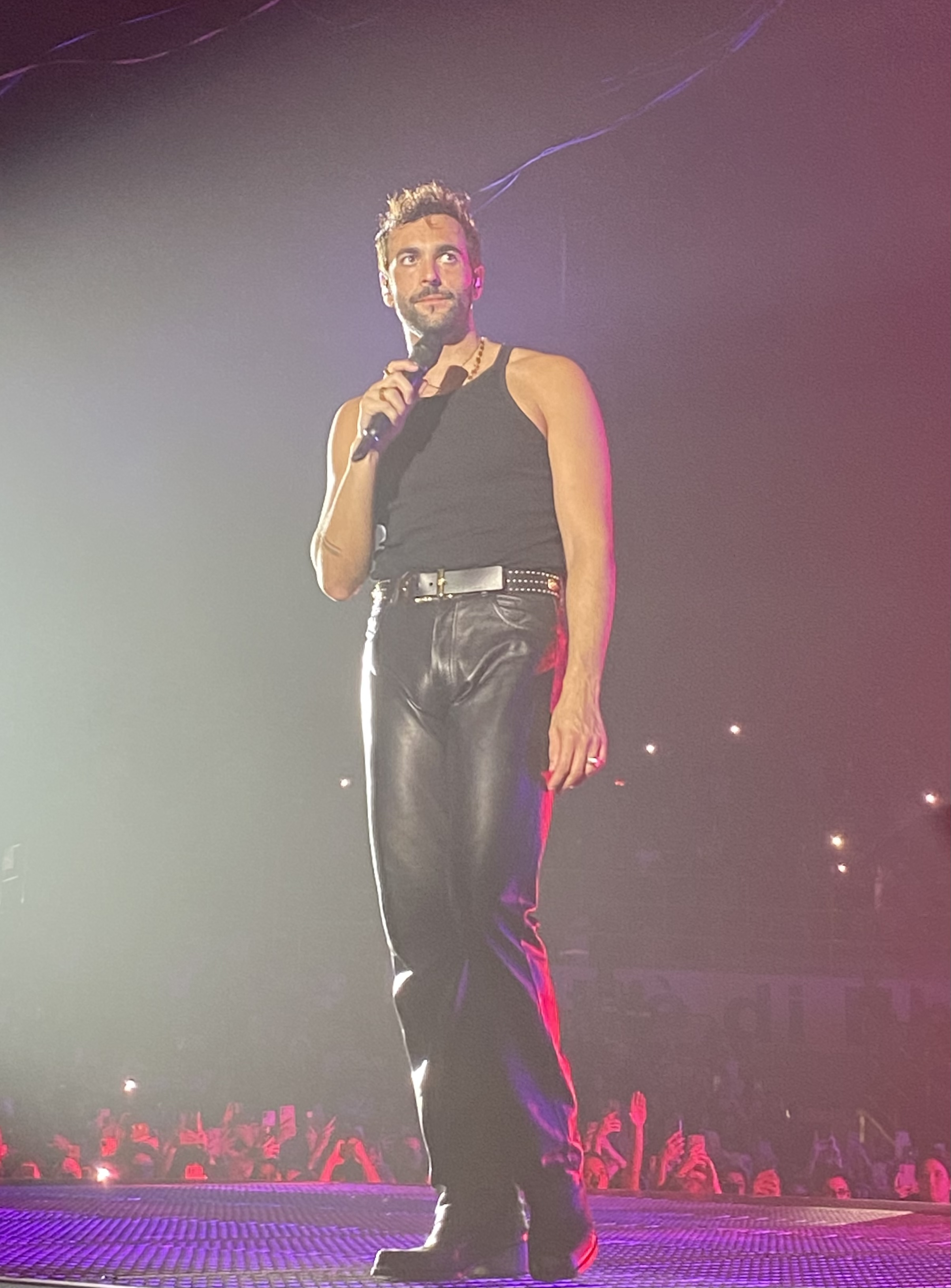
Mengoni on stage in 2022

=== Studio albums ===
- Solo 2.0 (2011)
- #prontoacorrere (2013)
- Parole in circolo (2015)
- Le cose che non ho (2015)
- Atlantico (2018)
- Materia (Terra) (2021)
- Materia (Pelle) (2022)
- Materia (Prisma) (2023)
- Felice sì, ma tutto sbagliato (2026)

== Tours ==
- 2010: Re matto tour
- 2011: Solo tour 2.0
- 2012: Tour teatrale
- 2013: L'Essenziale Tour
- 2015, 2016, 2019, 2022: #MengoniLive
- 2022–2023: Marco negli stadi

== Awards and nominations ==
Year	Ceremony	Category	Work	Result
2010	TRL Awards	MTV Man of the Year	Himself	Won
2010	TRL Awards	My TRL Best Video	"Credimi ancora"	Nominated
2010	MTV Europe Music Awards	Best Italian Act	Himself	Won
2010	MTV Europe Music Awards	Best European Act	Himself	Won
2010	Wind Music Awards	Platinum Album Award	Dove si vola	Won
2010	Wind Music Awards	Platinum Album Award	Re matto	Won
2011	TRL Awards	Best Talent Show Artist	Himself	Nominated
2011	Wind Music Awards	Platinum Album Award	Re matto live	Won
2011	Wind Music Awards	Platinum Digital Single Award	"Credimi ancora"	Won
2011	Wind Music Awards	Platinum Digital Single Award	"In un giorno qualunque"	Won
2012	TRL Awards	Best Look	Himself	Nominated
2012	TRL Awards	Superman Award	Himself	Won
2012	Onstage Awards	Best Video	"Dall'inferno"	Nominated
2013	Wind Music Awards	Multi-platinum Digital Single Award	"L'essenziale"	Won
2013	Wind Music Awards	Platinum Album Award	#prontoacorrere	Won
2013	MTV Italian Music Awards	Superman Award	Himself	Won
2013	MTV Italian Music Awards	Artist Saga	Himself	Won
2013	MTV Italian Music Awards	Best Fan	Himself	Nominated
2013	MTV Europe Music Awards	Best Italian Act	Himself	Won
2013	MTV Europe Music Awards	Best Southern European Act	Himself	Won
2013	MTV Europe Music Awards	Best Worldwide Act	Himself	Nominated
2014	Kids' Choice Awards	Best Italian Singer	Himself	Won
2014	MTV Italian Music Awards	Best Look	Himself	Won
2014	MTV Italian Music Awards	Best Fan	Himself	Won
2014	MTV Italian Music Awards	TwITStar	Himself	Won
2014	MTV Italian Music Awards	Artist Saga	Himself	Won
2015	Wind Music Awards	Multi-platinum Album Award	Parole in circolo	Won
2015	Wind Music Awards	Multi-platinum Single Award	"Guerriero"	Won
2015	MTV Italian Music Awards	Superman Award	Himself	Won
2015	MTV Italian Music Awards	Artist Saga	Himself	Won
2015	MTV Italian Music Awards	Best Performance	"Io ti aspetto"	Won
2015	MTV Europe Music Awards	Best Italian Act	Himself	Won
2015	MTV Europe Music Awards	Best European Act	Himself	Won
2016	Onstage Awards	Best Italian Tour	#MengoniLive2015	Nominated
2016	Onstage Awards	Live Anthem	"Esseri umani"	Nominated
2016	Onstage Awards	Best Fanbase	L'Esercito	Nominated
2016	Onstage Awards	Best Look	Himself	Nominated
2016	Onstage Awards	Best Performer	Himself	Won
2016	MTV Italian Music Awards	Best Italian Male	Himself	Won
2016	MTV Italian Music Awards	Best Tormentone	"Ti ho voluto bene veramente"	Nominated
2016	MTV Italian Music Awards	Best Fan	L'Esercito	Nominated
2017	MTV Italian Music Awards	Best Italian Male	Himself	Won
2017	MTV Italian Music Awards	Best Fan	L'Esercito	Won
2021	RTL 102.5 Power Hits Estate	Power Hits Estate	"Ma stasera"	Won
2023	Marcel Bezençon Awards	Composer Award	"Due vite"	Won
2023	David di Donatello	Best Original Song	"Caro amore lontanissimo"	Nominated
2023	Nastro d'Argento	Best Original Song	"Caro amore lontanissimo"	Won
2024	SIAE Music Awards	Best Song − Clubs with Live Music	"Due vite" (with Davide Petrella and Davide Simonetta)	Won
2024	SIAE Music Awards	Best Song − Social Media in Italy	"Due vite" (with Davide Petrella and Davide Simonetta)	Won

== Filmography ==
=== Film ===
Title	Year	Role(s)	Notes
The Lorax	2012	Once-ler	Italian dub Leggio d'Oro – Special Award as Relevaltion Voice Actor
The Lion King	2019	Simba	Italian dub
Klaus	2019	Jesper	Italian dub; Netflix Original Movie
Mufasa: The Lion King	2024	Simba	Italian dub

Awards and achievements
Preceded by Matteo Becucci	Italian X Factor; Winner; 2009	Succeeded by Nathalie Giannitrapani
Preceded by maNga	Best European Act in the MTV Europe Music Awards; 2010	Succeeded by Lena
Preceded by Emma Marrone; Mahmood and Blanco	Sanremo Music Festival; Winner; 2013; 2023	Succeeded by Arisa; Angelina Mango
Preceded by Nina Zilli with "L'amore è femmina"	Italy in the Eurovision Song Contest; 2013	Succeeded by Emma Marrone with "La mia città"
Preceded by Mahmood and Blanco with "Brividi"	Italy in the Eurovision Song Contest; 2023	Succeeded by Angelina Mango with "La noia"
