= Roberto Procaccini =

Roberto Procaccini • Lobbe
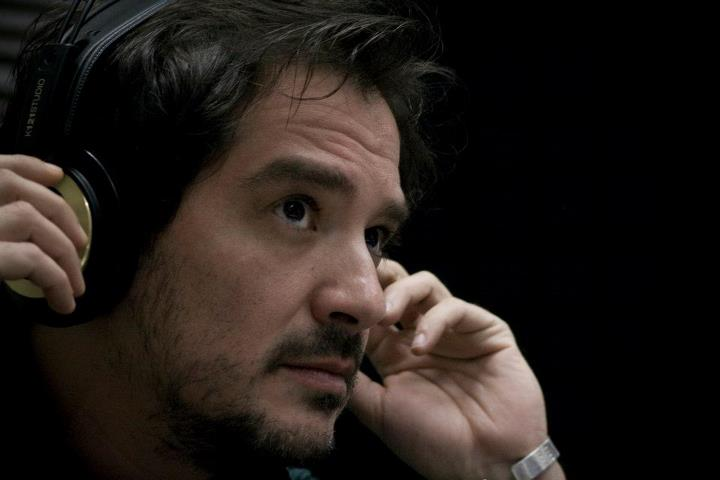

Background information
- Born: Roberto Procaccini; 22 September 1971 (age 54)
- Origin: Rome, Italy
- Genres: soundtrack, pop, classical, Jazz
- Occupations: Composer, musician, record producer, arranger
- Instruments: piano, keyboards
- Years active: 1999–present

Roberto Procaccini • Lobbe (born Roberto Procaccini, on 22 September 1971, Rome, Italy) is an Italian composer, producer, and keyboard player.

== Studies ==
He studied piano (classical and jazz) privately, and then at the University of Music in Rome. In 1995 he moved to Boston, United States, where he attended the Berklee College of Music, winning two scholarships (Best and Arif Mardin Scholarship) and graduated Summa cum laude in Contemporary Writing and Production; he followed workshops in composition and conducting with Maestro Mauro Bacherini and Peppe Vessicchio. As a composer divides his time between recordings, film, television and theater.

== Biography ==
In Italy he worked in various roles (arranger, producer, author, keyboardist) for many artists: Marina Rei, Zero Assoluto, Marco Mengoni, The Niro, Nathalie, Anansi, Otto Ohm, Bandabardò, Patty Pravo, Chiara Civello, Spagna, Ron, Damian Draghici, Claudio Mattone, Tony Renis, Peppe Vessicchio, Max Calò, Mark Armani, Syria, Barbara Eramo, Madame Lingerie, Red Desert, Stefano Palatresi, Enrico Sognato and Luna among others. He has also worked in the U.S. as an author, arranger and producer for EG Daily, Intermusic and Compression Records, in Spain as a songwriter and arranger for the musical "Aladdin." Has also launched an intense production of young talent including The Niro (produced together with Gianluca Vaccaro), published by Universal, the revelation of the artist in 2008 and winner of the MEI (Meeting of Independent Labels) in 2008 as best debutant proposal. In 2011, together with Valerio Faggioni has initiated the project Midinette, electro-pop music of quality in collaboration with the French singer Isabelle Seleskovitch and video maker Andrea "Jako" Giacomini, the debut video for the song, "Je Sais Pas", won first prize at the Rome Videoclip Festival 2011.

== Stage music for theater ==
- 3 Moschettieri e 1/2 (1997), directed by Claudio Insegno;
- Diana e la Tuda (1999/2000), Anphitryon Toujours (2000), Colpevole Innocenza (2001/2002), Pluto (2002), all directed by Arnoldo Foà;
- La Patrizia (2004), with Fabio Concato, directed by Roberto Innocente;
- Sign of Sound (2005), multimedia show of music, dance and painting, in collaboration with the musicians Antonio Sanchez and Grégoire Maret (Pat Metheny Group);
- Sul lago dorato, (2006/07) directed by Maurizio Panici;
- In punta di cuore (2010), directed by Lorenzo degl'Innocenti, scritto da Ugo Chiti;
- La ragazza di Bube (2012), directed by Paolo Biribò and Marco Toloni (from the novel of Carlo Cassola).

== Music for cinema ==
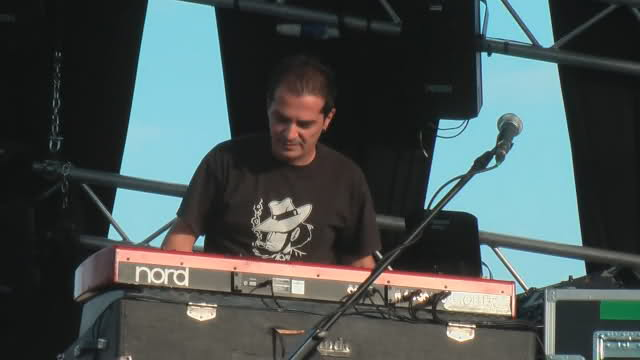
Roberto Procaccini at the keyboards during a concert with Zero Assoluto

- A quattro mani, film-interview at Carlo Lucarelli and Andrea Camilleri for RaiTre, and Memorie di Adriano – La voce dell’imperatore with Giorgio Albertazzi, both directed by Matteo Raffaelli (2007);
- Almeno io Fo..à (dedicated to Arnoldo Foà) (2008), directed by Alan Bacchelli and Lorenzo degl'Innocenti - Imaie prize;
- The African Game (2009) directed by Michele Massimo Tarantini;
- Trappola d’autore (2009) directed by Franco Salvia (Warner Chappell soundtrack);
- Sharm-el-Sheik (2010) directed by Ugo Fabrizio Giordani (collaboration with his original track);
- Io sono il teatro (2011) directed by Cosimo Damiano Damato (collaboration with his original track);
- Forte dei Marmi - All’origine del mito (2011) directed by Matteo Raffaelli.

== Prize ==
- Lettera d'Argento -Biennale della Poesia-, at the theatre La Fenice of Venice.
