= Italy in the Eurovision Song Contest 2016 =

- Eurovision Song Contest 2016
- Participating broadcaster: Radiotelevisione italiana (RAI)
- Country: Italy
- Selection process: Selection among Sanremo Music Festival 2016 entries
- Selection date: 14 February 2016

Competing entry
- Song: "No Degree of Separation"
- Artist: Francesca Michielin
- Songwriters: Federica Abbate; Francesca Michielin; Cheope; Fabio Gargiulo; Norma Jean Martine

Placement
- Final result: 16th, 124 points

Participation chronology

Italy was represented at the Eurovision Song Contest 2016 with the song "No Degree of Separation" written by Federica Abbate, Francesca Michielin, Cheope, Fabio Gargiulo, and Norma Jean Martine, and performed by Michielin herself. The Italian participating broadcaster, Radiotelevisione italiana (RAI), announced in October 2015 that the winning performer(s) of the Big Artists section of the Sanremo Music Festival 2016 would have the right to represent the country at the contest. The selected performer would also be given the right to choose their own song to compete with at Eurovision. The group Stadio ended up winning the Big Artists section, however they declined the opportunity to represent Italy in Stockholm. RAI then appointed the runner-up, Francesca Michielin, as the Italian entrant. Michielin performed a bilingual Italian and English version of her Sanremo runner-up entry "Nessun grado di separazione", which was titled "No Degree of Separation" at Eurovision.

As a member of the "Big Five", Italy automatically qualified to compete in the final of the Eurovision Song Contest. Performing in position 6, Italy placed sixteenth out of the 26 participating countries with 124 points.

== Background ==
Prior to the 2016 contest, Radiotelevisione italiana (RAI) had participated in the Eurovision Song Contest representing Italy forty-one times since its first entry during the inaugural contest in 1956. Since then, Italy has won the contest on two occasions: in 1964 with the song "Non ho l'età" performed by Gigliola Cinquetti and in 1990 with the song "Insieme: 1992" performed by Toto Cutugno. RAI has withdrawn from the Eurovision Song Contest a number of times with their most recent absence spanning from 1998 until 2010. Its return in 2011 with the song "Madness of Love", performed by Raphael Gualazzi, placed second—their highest result, to this point, since their victory in 1990. In 2015, Il Volo represented the nation with the song "Grande amore", obtaining third place.

As part of its duties as participating broadcaster, RAI organises the selection of its entry in the Eurovision Song Contest and broadcasts the event in the country. The broadcaster confirmed its participation in the 2016 contest on 15 September 2015. Between 2011 and 2013, RAI used the Sanremo Music Festival as an artist selection pool where a special committee would select one of the competing artist, independent of the results in the competition, as the Eurovision entrant. The selected entrant was then responsible for selecting the song they would compete with. For 2014, it forwent using the Sanremo Music Festival artist lineup and internally selected its entry. In 2015, RAI announced that the winning artist of the Sanremo Music Festival 2015 would be rewarded with the opportunity to represent Italy at the Eurovision Song Contest, a method that the broadcaster continued for 2016.

== Before Eurovision ==
=== Sanremo Music Festival 2016 ===
On 2 October 2015, Italian broadcaster RAI confirmed that the performer that would represent Italy at the 2016 Eurovision Song Contest would be selected from the competing artists at the Sanremo Music Festival 2016. According to the rules of Sanremo 2016, the winner of the Campioni or Big Artists category earns the right to represent Italy at the Eurovision Song Contest, but in case the artist is not available or refuses the offer, the organisers of the event reserve the right to choose another participant via their own criteria. The competition took place between 9–13 February 2016 with the winner being selected on the last day of the festival.

Twenty artists competed in the Big Artists category of Sanremo 2016. Among the competing artists was former Eurovision Song Contest entrant Enrico Ruggeri who represented Italy in 1993. The performers in the "Big Artists" category were:

Artist	Song	Songwriter(s)
Alessio Bernabei	"Noi siamo infinito"	Ivan Amatucci, Roberto Casalino, Dario Faini
Annalisa	"Il diluvio universale"	Annalisa Scarrone, Diego Calvetti
Arisa	"Guardando il cielo"	Giuseppe Anastasi
Bluvertigo	"Semplicemente"	Marco Castoldi
Clementino	"Quando sono lontano"	Clemente Macarro, Vincent Stein, Konstantin Scherer
Dear Jack	"Mezzo respiro"	Roberto Balbo, Stefano Paviani, Leiner Riflessi, Claudio Corradini
Dolcenera	"Ora o mai più (le cose cambiano)"	Emanuela Trane, Alessandro Finazzo
Elio e le Storie Tese	"Vincere l'odio"	Stefano Belisari, Sergio Conforti, Davide Civaschi, Nicola Fasani
Enrico Ruggeri	"Il primo amore non si scorda mai"	Enrico Ruggeri
Francesca Michielin	"Nessun grado di separazione"	Federica Abbate, Francesca Michielin, Cheope, Fabio Gargiulio
Giovanni Caccamo and Deborah Iurato	"Via da qui"	Giuliano Sangiorgi
Irene Fornaciari	"Blu"	Irene Fornaciari, Diego Calvetti, Giuseppe Dati, Marco Fontana
Lorenzo Fragola	"Infinite volte"	Lorenzo Fragola, Rory Di Benedetto, Rosario Canale, Fabrizio Ferraguzzo, Antonio Filippelli
Neffa	"Sogno e nostalgia"	Giovanni Pellino
Noemi	"La borsa di una donna"	Marco Masini, Marco Adami, Antonio Iammarino
Patty Pravo	"Cieli immensi"	Fortunato Zampaglione
Rocco Hunt	"Wake Up"	Rocco Pagliarulo, Vicenzo Catanzaro, Simone Benussi
Stadio	"Un giorno mi dirai"	Saverio Grandi, Gaetano Curreri, Luca Chiaravalli
Valerio Scanu	"Finalmente piove"	Fabrizio Moro
Zero Assoluto	"Di me e di te"	Thomas De Gasperi, Matteo Maffucci, Antonio Filippelli, Luca Vicini

==== Final ====
During the final evening of the Sanremo Music Festival 2016, the group Stadio was selected as the winner with the song "Un giorno mi dirai". Afterwards, RAI announced through social media that Stadio would not represent Italy in Stockholm. However, RAI later confirmed during the closing press conference for the Sanremo Music Festival on 14 February 2016 that they were still waiting for Stadio's final decision on whether they would participate at Eurovision. The band ultimately declined the opportunity to represent Italy and stated: "We would love to participate, but we have a tour already planned. If we were young men we'd just be happy". An announcement was made shortly afterwards that Sanremo 2016 runner-up Francesca Michielin would represent Italy at the Eurovision Song Contest 2016.

First Round – 13 February 2016
R/O	Artist	Song	Jury (30%)	Demoscopic Poll (30%)	Televote (40%)	Total	Place
1	Francesca Michielin	"Nessun grado di separazione"	6.88%	9.72%	8.17%	8.25%	2
2	Alessio Bernabei	"Noi siamo infinito"	0.00%	3.12%	8.05%	4.16%	14
3	Clementino	"Quando sono lontano"	3.75%	4.22%	7.80%	5.51%	7
4	Patty Pravo	"Cieli immensi"	3.75%	5.98%	8.23%	6.21%	6
5	Lorenzo Fragola	"Infinite volte"	2.50%	5.93%	9.40%	6.29%	5
6	Noemi	"La borsa di una donna"	4.38%	8.03%	4.12%	5.37%	8
7	Elio e le Storie Tese	"Vincere l'odio"	4.38%	6.13%	2.66%	4.22%	12
8	Arisa	"Guardando il cielo"	3.13%	7.20%	3.73%	4.59%	10
9	Stadio	"Un giorno mi dirai"	45.00%	10.57%	10.30%	20.79%	1
10	Annalisa	"Il diluvio universale"	0.63%	6.52%	5.45%	4.32%	11
11	Rocco Hunt	"Wake Up"	1.25%	6.00%	7.43%	5.15%	9
12	Dolcenera	"Ora o mai più (le cose cambiano)"	1.88%	6.38%	2.39%	3.43%	15
13	Enrico Ruggeri	"Il primo amore non si scorda mai"	8.75%	7.52%	3.62%	6.33%	4
14	Giovanni Caccamo and Deborah Iurato	"Via da qui"	10.63%	6.32%	7.85%	8.22%	3
15	Valerio Scanu	"Finalmente piove"	0.00%	2.95%	8.20%	4.17%	13
16	Irene Fornaciari	"Blu"	3.13%	3.42%	2.60%	3.00%	16

Sanremo Music Festival 2025 winner

Second Round – 13 February 2016
R/O	Artist	Song	Jury (30%)	Demoscopic Poll (30%)	Televote (40%)	Total	Place
1	Giovanni Caccamo and Deborah Iurato	"Via da qui"	25.00%	29.39%	26.43%	26.89%	3
2	Francesca Michielin	"Nessun grado di separazione"	27.08%	34.72%	29.58%	30.37%	2
3	Stadio	"Un giorno mi dirai"	47.92%	35.89%	43.99%	42.74%	1

=== Song selection ===
On 14 March 2016, RAI confirmed that Francesca Michielin would perform a bilingual Italian and English version of her Sanremo Music Festival 2016 runner-up song "Nessun grado di separazione", which would be titled "No Degree of Separation" at the Eurovision Song Contest 2016.

=== Promotion ===
Francesca Michielin made several appearances across Europe to promote "No Degree of Separation" as the Italian Eurovision entry. On 9 April, Michielin performed during the Eurovision in Concert event which was held at the Melkweg venue in Amsterdam, Netherlands and hosted by Cornald Maas and Hera Björk. On 17 April, Michielin performed at the London Eurovision Party, which was held at the Café de Paris venue in London, United Kingdom and hosted by Nicki French and Paddy O'Connell. In the week prior to arriving in Stockholm, Michielin made promotional appearances in Vienna, Warsaw, Berlin and Copenhagen.

== At Eurovision ==
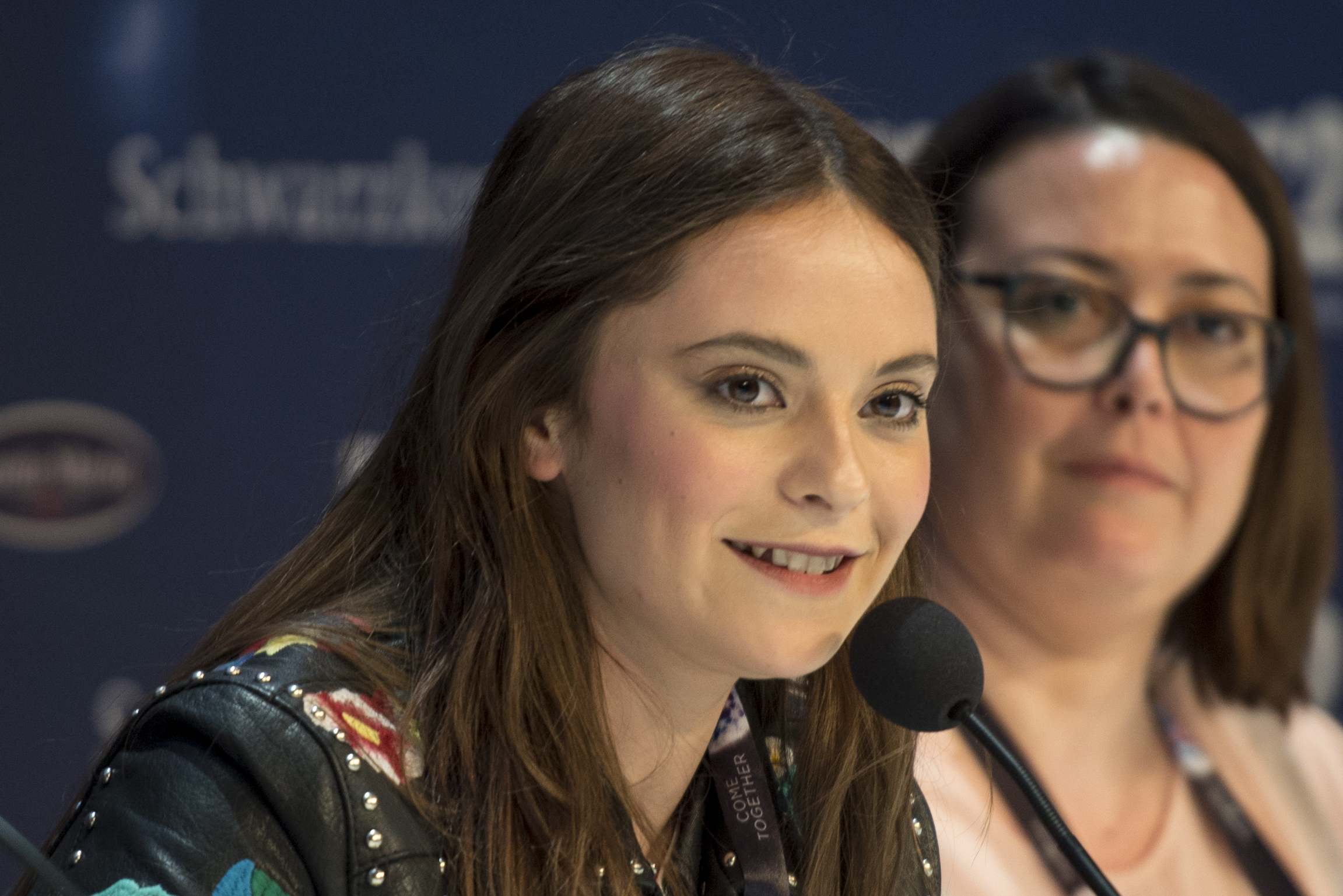
Francesca Michielin during a press meet and greet

According to Eurovision rules, all nations with the exceptions of the host country and the "Big Five" (France, Germany, Italy, Spain and the United Kingdom) are required to qualify from one of two semi-finals in order to compete for the final; the top ten countries from each semi-final progress to the final. As a member of the "Big Five", Italy automatically qualified to compete in the final on 14 May 2016. In addition to their participation in the final, Italy is also required to broadcast and vote in one of the two semi-finals. During the semi-final allocation draw on 25 January 2016, Italy was assigned to broadcast and vote in the second semi-final on 12 May 2016.

In Italy, the two semi-finals were broadcast on Rai 4 with commentary by Marco Ardemagni and Filippo Solibello. The final was broadcast on Rai 1 with commentary by Federico Russo and Flavio Insinna. All shows were also broadcast via radio on Rai Radio 2 with commentary by Marco Ardemagni and Filippo Solibello. The Italian spokesperson, who announced the top 12-point score awarded by the Italian jury during the final, was Claudia Andreatti.

=== Final ===
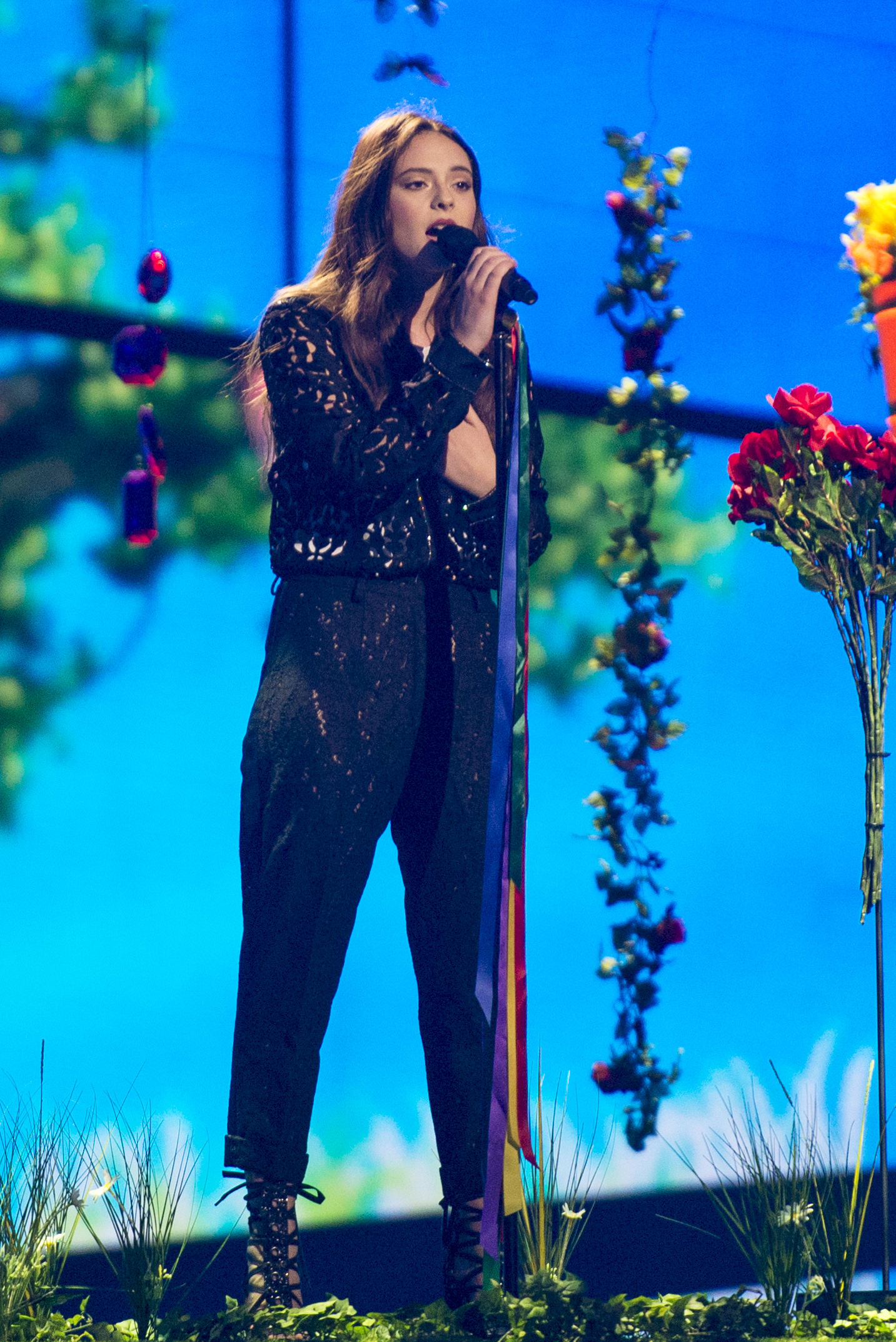
Francesca Michielin during a rehearsal before the final

Francesca Michielin took part in technical rehearsals on 7 and 8 May, followed by dress rehearsals on 11, 13 and 14 May. This included the semi-final jury show on 11 May where an extended clip of the Italian performance was filmed for broadcast during the live show on 12 May and the jury final on 13 May where the professional juries of each country watched and voted on the competing entries. During the opening ceremony festivities that took place on 8 May, Francesca Michielin took part in a draw to determine in which half of the final the Italian entry would be performed. Italy was drawn to compete in the first half. Following the conclusion of the second semi-final, the shows' producers decided upon the running order of the final. The running order for the semi-finals and final was decided by the shows' producers rather than through another draw, so that similar songs were not placed next to each other. Italy was subsequently placed to perform in position 6, following the entry from Hungary and before the entry from Israel.

The Italian performance featured Francesca Michielin on a grass covered platform performing in jumpsuit and surrounded by various stage props including flowers, fruits, balloons and diamonds. The stage lighting was predominately blue with the background LED screens displaying a large green tree and blue skies. Michielin was joined by two off-stage backing vocalists: Nicole Pellicani and Sabrina Fiorella. Italy placed sixteenth in the final, scoring 124 points: 34 points from the televoting and 90 points from the juries.

=== Voting ===
Voting during the three shows was conducted under a new system that involved each country now awarding two sets of points from 1-8, 10 and 12: one from their professional jury and the other from televoting. Each nation's jury consisted of five music industry professionals who are citizens of the country they represent, with their names published before the contest to ensure transparency. This jury judged each entry based on: vocal capacity; the stage performance; the song's composition and originality; and the overall impression by the act. In addition, no member of a national jury was permitted to be related in any way to any of the competing acts in such a way that they cannot vote impartially and independently. The individual rankings of each jury member as well as the nation's televoting results were released shortly after the grand final.

Below is a breakdown of points awarded to Italy and awarded by Italy in the second semi-final and grand final of the contest, and the breakdown of the jury voting and televoting conducted during the two shows:

==== Points awarded to Italy ====
Points awarded to Italy (Final)
Score	Televote	Jury
12 points		France; Norway
10 points	Albania	Belgium; San Marino
8 points		Albania; Malta
7 points	Malta; Switzerland	
6 points		Ireland; Netherlands
5 points		Spain
4 points	Montenegro	
3 points	Spain	Croatia; Cyprus; Germany
2 points		Finland; Switzerland
1 point	Germany; Macedonia; Slovenia	

==== Points awarded by Italy ====
Points awarded by Italy (Semi-final 2)
Score	Televote	Jury
12 points	Ukraine	Australia
10 points	Poland	Ukraine
8 points	Albania	Israel
7 points	Bulgaria	Georgia
6 points	Serbia	Slovenia
5 points	Belgium	Serbia
4 points	Lithuania	Belgium
3 points	Australia	Poland
2 points	Macedonia	Ireland
1 point	Belarus	Lithuania

Points awarded by Italy (Final)
Score	Televote	Jury
12 points	Ukraine	Spain
10 points	Poland	Ukraine
8 points	Russia	Israel
7 points	Bulgaria	France
6 points	Cyprus	Australia
5 points	France	Malta
4 points	Serbia	Netherlands
3 points	Georgia	Georgia
2 points	Lithuania	Sweden
1 point	Armenia	Cyprus

==== Detailed voting results ====
The following members comprised the Italian jury:

- Max Novaresi – television host, writer (jury member in semi-final 1)
- Alessandro Pigliavento – web marketing specialist, blogger
- Paolo Belli – singer, showman
- Andrea Delogu – TV show host
- Stefania Zizzari – journalist
- Tiziana Leone – journalist (jury member in the final)

Detailed voting results from Italy (Semi-final 2)
R/O	Country	Jury							Televote		
R/O	Country	M. Novaresi	P. Belli	A. Delogu	A. Pigliavento	S. Zizzari	Rank	Points	Percentage	Rank	Points
01	Latvia	18	15	10	9	4	13		3.26%	12	
02	Poland	4	14	11	13	6	8	3	12.49%	2	10
03	Switzerland	17	11	9	14	15	15		1.25%	17	
04	Israel	3	10	5	3	1	3	8	2.88%	13	
05	Belarus	5	6	15	17	12	12		3.59%	10	1
06	Serbia	11	7	8	8	8	6	5	4.61%	5	6
07	Ireland	9	4	13	15	9	9	2	2.37%	14	
08	Macedonia	8	13	16	16	18	17		3.63%	9	2
09	Lithuania	15	12	7	12	5	10	1	4.45%	7	4
10	Australia	1	5	4	1	2	1	12	3.96%	8	3
11	Slovenia	14	3	3	10	7	5	6	0.94%	18	
12	Bulgaria	16	9	12	7	10	11		7.70%	4	7
13	Denmark	12	8	18	18	11	16		2.36%	15	
14	Ukraine	6	1	6	2	3	2	10	26.87%	1	12
15	Norway	13	16	17	11	16	18		2.00%	16	
16	Georgia	2	2	1	5	13	4	7	3.36%	11	
17	Albania	7	18	14	6	17	14		9.76%	3	8
18	Belgium	10	17	2	4	14	7	4	4.52%	6	5

Detailed voting results from Italy (Final)
R/O	Country	Jury							Televote		
R/O	Country	A. Pigliavento	P. Belli	A. Delogu	T. Leone	S. Zizzari	Rank	Points	Percentage	Rank	Points
01	Belgium	15	19	7	11	10	11		1.67%	18	
02	Czech Republic	23	18	25	22	13	24		0.77%	24	
03	Netherlands	14	5	5	10	4	7	4	1.47%	19	
04	Azerbaijan	22	21	15	21	22	25		0.93%	23	
05	Hungary	21	22	16	13	23	20		1.84%	15	
06	Italy										
07	Israel	6	9	6	5	1	3	8	1.69%	17	
08	Bulgaria	9	15	17	18	15	14		9.49%	4	7
09	Sweden	24	4	11	6	5	9	2	1.81%	16	
10	Germany	10	11	12	19	24	15		1.19%	21	
11	France	1	1	18	2	6	4	7	2.77%	6	5
12	Poland	20	14	24	25	11	19		11.34%	2	10
13	Australia	3	8	8	9	2	5	6	2.52%	11	
14	Cyprus	16	23	3	8	8	10	1	3.50%	5	6
15	Serbia	13	20	20	23	21	21		2.75%	7	4
16	Lithuania	17	24	14	16	7	16		2.67%	9	2
17	Croatia	8	13	21	12	25	17		0.97%	22	
18	Russia	25	3	23	17	12	18		11.03%	3	8
19	Spain	5	6	1	1	9	1	12	2.16%	13	
20	Latvia	11	12	9	20	14	13		1.97%	14	
21	Ukraine	4	7	4	7	3	2	10	27.89%	1	12
22	Malta	2	2	10	3	18	6	5	1.35%	20	
23	Georgia	7	16	2	4	20	8	3	2.69%	8	3
24	Austria	19	25	22	15	17	23		2.16%	12	
25	United Kingdom	12	10	13	14	16	12		0.74%	25	
26	Armenia	18	17	19	24	19	22		2.63%	10	1
