= Nice to Meet You (Acoustic Live Solo) =

EP by Francesca Michielin
- Released: 30 January 2016
- Recorded: 2015
- Genre: Pop
- Label: Sony Music Entertainment Italy

Francesca Michielin chronology
di20 (2015)	Nice to Meet You (Acoustic Live Solo) (2016)	2640 (2018)

Nice to Meet You (Acoustic Live Solo) is the second extended play by Italian singer Francesca Michielin. It was released in Italy on 30 January 2016 through Sony Music Entertainment Italy. The EP peaked at number 52 on the Italian Albums Chart.

== Track listing ==
Standard listing
No.	Title	Length
1.	"Distratto (I Wonder About You)" (Acoustic Live Solo)	3:52
2.	"Be My Husband" (Acoustic Live Solo)	2:36
3.	"L'amore esiste" (Acoustic Live Solo)	4:15
4.	"(Tanto) 3" (Acoustic Live Solo)	4:09
5.	"Honey Sun" (Acoustic Live Solo)	5:53
6.	"Lontano" (Acoustic Live Solo)	3:13
7.	"Nice to Meet You" (Acoustic Live Solo)	4:16

== Chart performance ==
=== Weekly charts ===
Chart (2016)	Peak position
Italian Albums (FIMI)	52

== Release history ==
Region	Release date	Format	Label
Italy	30 January 2016	Digital download; CD	Sony Music Entertainment Italy
