= Eccomi =

Studio album by Patty Pravo
- Released: 12 February 2016
- Genre: Pop
- Length: 46:30
- Language: Italian
- Label: Warner Music Italy
- Producer: Michele Canova; Massimo Levantini; Gaetano Puglisi

Patty Pravo chronology
Nella terra dei pinguini (2011)	Eccomi (2016)	Red (2019)

Professional ratings
Review scores
Source	Rating
Europopmusic.eu	3.5/5 stars
Rockol	3/5 stars

Eccomi (Italian for Here I Am) is a studio album by Italian singer Patty Pravo, released in 2016 by Warner Music Group.

== Overview ==
The album was produced by Michele Canova, with Massimo Levantini and Gaetano Puglisi as executive producers. The songs were written by Fortunato Zampaglione, Tiziano Ferro, Samuel Umberto Romano of Subsonica, and Giuliano Sangiorgi of Negramaro, among others. Two tracks feature guest appearances by Italian rappers Emis Killa and Fred De Palma.

Pravo originally intended to release the album in autumn 2013, but the date was then pushed back to January 2014. The recording session, however, continued until late March 2015 and the release was then set for autumn 2015. Eccomi was eventually released in February 2016, coinciding with the 66th Sanremo Music Festival where the first single "Cieli immensi" placed at the 6th position and won the "Mia Martini" critics' award. The song was a top 20 success in Italy and Eccomi peaked at no. 6 on the Italian albums chart, Pravo's highest position in almost sixteen years. In May 2016, Tiziano Ferro-penned "Per difenderti da me" ("To Defend You from Myself") was released to radio as the second single. The singer promoted the album with the Eccomi Tour which ran from April to August 2016.

== Track listing ==
1. "A parte te" – 3:42
2. "Ci rivedremo poi" – 3:15
3. "Qualche cosa di diverso" – 3:09
4. "Cieli immensi" – 4:15
5. "Per difenderti da me" – 3:37
6. "Nuvole" – 3:49
7. "Non siamo eroi" (feat. Emis Killa) – 3:50
8. "Possiedimi" – 3:12
9. "Se chiudo gli occhi" – 3:09
10. "Come una preghiera" – 3:10
11. "Se" – 4:39
12. "Un uomo semplice" – 3:25
13. "Tutt'al più" (feat. Fred De Palma) – 3:18

== Charts ==
=== Weekly charts ===
Chart (2016)	Peak position
Italian Albums (FIMI)	6
Italian Vinyl Albums (FIMI)	1

=== Year-end charts ===
Chart (2016)	Peak position
Italy	99
