= Nessun grado di separazione =

2016 song by Francesca Michielin

Single by Francesca Michielin

from the album di20are
- Released: 11 February 2016
- Recorded: 2015
- Genre: Pop
- Length: 3:39
- Label: Sony Music Italy
- Songwriters: Francesca Michielin; Federica Abbate; Alfredo Rapetti; Fabio Gargiulo
- Producer: Michele Canova

Francesca Michielin singles chronology
"Lontano" (2015)	"Nessun grado di separazione" (2016)	"Un cuore in due" (2016)

Cover of the Eurovision version

Music video
- "Nessun grado di separazione" on YouTube

Eurovision Song Contest 2016 entry
- Country: Italy
- Artist: Francesca Michielin
- Languages: Italian, English
- Composers: Cheope; Fabio Gargiulo; Federica Abbate
- Lyricists: Federica Abbate; Francesca Michielin; Norma Jean Martine

Finals performance
- Final result: 16th
- Final points: 124

Entry chronology
- ◄ "Grande amore" (2015)
- "Occidentali's Karma" (2017) ►

"Nessun grado di separazione" (Italian pronunciation: [nesˌsuŋ ˈɡraːdo di separatˈtsjoːne]) is a song recorded by Italian singer Francesca Michielin. Written by Michielin herself along with Cheope, Federica Abbate and Fabio Gargiulo; the song was produced by Michele Canova. Placed second in the Sanremo Music Festival 2016, the song released as a single from the reissued version of Michielin's second studio album, di20are. A bilingual English and Italian version of the song called "No Degree of Separation" represented Italy in the Eurovision Song Contest 2016 held in Stockholm, Sweden.

== Composition and recording ==
Michielin explained the lyrical content of "Nessun grado di separazione" in several interviews, claiming that the song is inspired by the six degrees of separation theory and contains the message that, "despite all of the cultural differences, there shouldn't be distances between people". Particularly, the composition's verses, biographical and introspective, tell the story of "a girl who lives in a drawer [...] together with all her crumpled dreams, and who, at a certain point, finds the courage to come out from that shelter to face the true life", with the will to open herself to the outside world, overcoming fears and preconceptions.

Michielin also added that she recorded background vocals for the track on the same day of the November 2015 Paris attacks, therefore she was furthermore inspired to reflect on the song's lyrics and on "all the barriers that exist between people, while the truth is that we are all human beings with dreams and hopes".

== Sanremo Music Festival and Eurovision Song Contest ==
On 13 December 2015, during Massimo Giletti's TV show L'arena, Carlo Conti announced the list of performers and songs selected to compete in the 66th Sanremo Music Festival, which included Francesca Michielin's "Nessun grado di separazione". Michielin performed the song for the first time at the Teatro Ariston in Sanremo during the second evening of the show, on 10 February 2016. The song placed second in the competition, behind Stadio's "Un giorno mi dirai". The band was then eligible to represent Italy in the Eurovision Song Contest 2016, but they declined, stating they would be on a previously planned tour in May 2016. Their decision led RAI to select Michielin as the Italian entry for the 61st edition of the European competition. On 14 March 2016, a bilingual version of "Nessun grado di separazione", titled "No Degree of Separation", was announced as Michielin's entry for the contest. This version is entirely in Italian, except for the last chorus, which was adapted in English by American songwriter Norma Jean Martine; the track also has a different arrangement. Michielin performed this version for the first time on 22 March 2016, during the Web show Webnotte, streamed live by la Repubblica's website. Since Italy is part of the "Big 5", Michielin automatically qualified to compete in the final on 14 May 2016, where she placed 16th with 124 points.

== Media appearances ==
In 2020, the song was featured on the soundtrack of the miniseries We Are Who We Are, directed by Luca Guadagnino.

== Track listing ==
Digital download
No.	Title	Length
1.	"Nessun grado di separazione"	3:39

Eurovision version
No.	Title	Length
1.	"No Degree of Separation"	3:08

== Charts ==
Chart (2016)	Peak position
Italy (FIMI)	1
Italy Airplay (EarOne)	1
San Marino (RTV)	4
Sweden Heatseekers (Sverigetopplistan)	6

== Certifications ==
Region	Certification	Certified units/sales
Italy (FIMI)	2× Platinum	100,000^{‡}
^{‡} Sales+streaming figures based on certification alone.

== Release history ==
Region	Date	Format	Label	Ref
Italy	11 February 2016	Digital download	RCA (Sony Music Italy)	
Italy	11 February 2016	Mainstream radio	RCA (Sony Music Italy)	
