= Sanremo Music Festival 2016 =

Italian song contest (66th edition)

- Tutti cantano Sanremo

Dates and venue
- Semi-final 1: 9 February 2016
- Semi-final 2: 10 February 2016
- Semi-final 3: 11 February 2016
- Semi-final 4: 12 February 2016
- Final: 13 February 2016
- Venue: Teatro Ariston; Sanremo, Italy

Production
- Broadcaster: Radiotelevisione italiana (RAI)
- Director: Maurizio Pagnussat
- Musical director: Pinuccio Pirazzoli
- Artistic director: Carlo Conti
- Presenters: Carlo Conti and Virginia Raffaele, Mădălina Diana Ghenea, Gabriel Garko

Big Artists section
- Number of entries: 20
- Winner: "Un giorno mi dirai" Stadio

Newcomers' section
- Number of entries: 8
- Winner: "Amen"; Francesco Gabbani

The Sanremo Music Festival 2016 (Italian: Festival di Sanremo 2016), officially the 66th Italian Song Festival (66º Festival della canzone italiana), was the 66th annual Sanremo Music Festival, a television song contest held at the Teatro Ariston in Sanremo, Liguria, between 9 and 13 February 2016, organised and broadcast by Radiotelevisione italiana (RAI). The show was presented by Carlo Conti, who also served as the artistic director for the competition, together with Virginia Raffaele, Mădălina Diana Ghenea and Gabriel Garko. The program was written by Carlo Conti, Ivana Sabatini, Emanuele Giovannini, Leopoldo Siano, Giona Peduzzi, Riccardo Cassini, Martino Clericetti and Mario D'Amico.

The Campioni or Big Artists section included 20 established Italian artists, competing with a song each, while 8 artists and songs competed in the Nuove proposte or Newcomers' section. The final for the Newcomers' section took place on 12 February 2016 where "Amen" performed by Francesco Gabbani was selected as the winner. The final for the Big Artists section took place on 13 February 2016 where "Un giorno mi dirai" performed by Stadio was selected as the winner. As the winners of the main section, Stadio also won the right to represent Italy at the Eurovision Song Contest 2016; however, RAI confirmed after the competition that Stadio decided not to participate in the contest, with runner-up Francesca Michielin and "Nessun grado di separazione" being selected by RAI as the Italian Eurovision entrant.

== Format ==
The 2016 edition of the Sanremo Music Festival took place at the Teatro Ariston in Sanremo, organised by the Italian broadcaster Radiotelevisione italiana (RAI). The artistic director for the competition was Carlo Conti, who was appointed to the position for a second consecutive year. The competition took place over five evenings between 9–13 February 2016. The selected artists competed during the festival under two different sections: Campioni/Big Artists and Nuove Proposte/Newcomers' . Twenty songs competed in the Big Artists section and eight songs competed in the Newcomers' section; both competitive sections ran concurrently with each other over the five evenings. All songs in the competition were required to be new compositions performed in the Italian language with some exceptions for words and phrases in other dialects/languages. The songs were performed in the competition live and accompanied by an orchestra.

The twenty entries competing in the Big Artists section were presented during the first and second evenings on 9 and 10 February. Ten songs were performed during each evening and were voted upon by a press jury (50%) and public televote (50%) with no eliminations occurring during either evening. All twenty songs advanced to the fourth evening, the semi-final, and faced an additional vote consisting of public televoting (40%), an expert jury (30%) and an demoscopic poll (30%). The weighted average of the votes from the first and second evenings as well as the votes from the fourth evening produced a total ranking of all of the songs. Based on this ranking, the top fifteen entries qualified to the final on the fifth evening on 13 February. The bottom five entries from the fourth evening entered a repechage round and faced an additional public televote to determine the one entry that would be readmitted to compete in the final; the other four entries were eliminated. In the final, sixteen songs competed and the top three advanced to a second round of voting in order to select the winner. The results of both rounds of voting were determined by public televoting (40%), an expert jury (30%) and an demoscopic poll (30%). An additional competition among the performers competing in the Big Artists section occurred during the third evening where each act performed a cover of an Italian song or an international hit translated into Italian. The best cover, as determined by the equal combination of votes from a press jury and a public televote, was awarded with a prize.

The eight entries competing in the Newcomers' section were divided into four semi-final duels consisting of two songs each. Two duels took place during both the second and third evenings on 10 and 11 February. The winner of each duel, as determined by the equal combination of votes from a press jury and a public televote, advanced to the final held during the fourth evening on 12 February. During the final, the four entries competed and the winner was determined via the combination of a public televote (40%), an expert jury (30%) and an demoscopic poll (30%).

=== Voting ===
Voting during the five evenings occurred through different combinations of the following methods:

- Public televoting – carried out via landline, mobile phone, app and/or online voting.
- Press jury – composed of accredited journalists that followed the competition from the Roof Hall at the Teatro Ariston.
- Demoscopic poll – composed of a sample of 300 music fans, which voted from their homes via an electronic voting system managed by Ipsos.
- Expert jury – eight personalities from the world of music, entertainment and culture consisting of:
  - Franz Di Cioccio (Chairman) – Musician, actor and journalist
  - Laura Valente – Singer and musician
  - Fausto Brizzi – Screenwriter, producer and film director
  - Nicoletta Mantovani – Commissioner for cooperation and international relations for Florence; widow of opera singer Luciano Pavarotti
  - Massimiliano Pani – Songwriter, producer and composer
  - Valentina Correani – Television presenter and actress
  - Paola Maugeri – Journalist, singer and television presenter
  - Federico l'Olandese Volante – Radio presenter, record producer and television personality

=== Presenters ===
Television presenter Carlo Conti, who was also the competition's artistic director, hosted Sanremo for a second consecutive year. Conti was joined by three additional hosts: actress and comic Virginia Raffaele, Romanian actress and model Mădălina Diana Ghenea and actor Gabriel Garko. Raffaele presented the first four evenings of the competition impersonating different female celebrities: actress Sabrina Ferilli (first evening), ballet dancer and actress Carla Fracci (second evening), fashion designer Donatella Versace (third evening) and actress, model and previous Sanremo host Belén Rodríguez (fourth evening).

== Selections ==
Decisions related to the selection of artists and compositions were taken by Carlo Conti in collaboration with a music committee under the direction of Rai 1. The members of the music committee consisted of Piero Chiambretti (presenter/showman), Rosita Celentano (presenter/singer/actress), Giovanni Allevi (musician), Federico Russo (presenter), Carolina Di Domenico (VJ) and Andrea Delogu (presenter).

=== Newcomers' section ===
Artists that were interested in competing in the Newcomers' section could apply to one of two different qualifiers: #SG – Sanremo Giovani and Area Sanremo. The eight artists competing in the Newcomers' section were revealed on 27 November 2015. Six of the eight artists were selected through the programme #SG – Sanremo Giovani, which aired on Rai 1 and was hosted by Carlo Conti. 655 applications were initially received from which twelve artists were selected to proceed to the televised programme. The six artists were selected by the festival's artistic director Carlo Conti together with the competition's music committee.

Two of the eight artists, Mahmood and Miele, were selected though the competition Area Sanremo, which was a separate qualifier for the Newcomers' section that included artists auditioning in October 2015 and being shortlisted to eight finalists before two were selected to proceed to Sanremo 2016.

=== Big Artists section ===
Artists competing in the Big Artists section were selected based on criteria such as the quality and originality of the songs, interpretation, contemporaneity and the fame and recognized value of the performer(s). Artists interested in competing in the Big Artists section were required to submit their proposals to RAI by 11 December 2015. The names of the twenty participants competing in the Big Artists section were announced by Carlo Conti on 13 December 2015 during the Rai 1 programme L'Arena, hosted by Massimo Giletti.

== Competing entries ==
Competing songs and artists, showing writers, orchestra conductor and results achieved
Big Artists section
| Song | Artist(s) | Songwriter(s) | Orchestra conductor | Rank | Sanremo Music Festival Awards |
|---|---|---|---|---|---|
| "Un giorno mi dirai" | Stadio | Saverio Grandi; Gaetano Curreri; Luca Chiaravalli | Beppe D'Onghia | 1 | Winner of the "Big Artists" section - Golden Lion; Press, Radio, TV & Web Award "Lucio Dalla"; "Giancarlo Bigazzi" Award for Best Arrangement |
| "Nessun grado di separazione" | Francesca Michielin | Francesca Michielin; Federica Abbate; Alfredo "Cheope" Rapetti; Fabio Gargiulio | Peppe Vessicchio; Roberto Rossi | 2 | |
| "Via da qui" | Giovanni Caccamo & Deborah Iurato | Giuliano Sangiorgi | Daniele Parziani | 3 | |
| "Il primo amore non si scorda mai" | Enrico Ruggeri | Enrico Ruggeri | Roberto Rossi | 4 | |
| "Infinite volte" | Lorenzo Fragola | Lorenzo Fragola; Antonio Filippelli; Rory Di Benedetto; Rosario Canale; Fabrizio Ferraguzzo | Roberto Rossi | 5 | |
| "Cieli immensi" | Patty Pravo | Fortunato Zampaglione | Peppe Vessicchio | 6 | Critics' Award "Mia Martini" |
| "Quando sono lontano" | Clementino | Clemente "Clementino" Maccaro; Kostantin Scherer; Vincent Stein | Enzo Campagnoli | 7 | |
| "La borsa di una donna" | Noemi | Marco Masini; Marco Adami; Antonio Iammarino | Roberto Rossi | 8 | |
| "Wake Up" | Rocco Hunt | Rocco "Hunt" Pagliarulo; Simone "Mace" Benussi; Vincenzo Catanzaro | Roberto Rossi | 9 | |
| "Guardando il cielo" | Arisa | Giuseppe Anastasi | Giuseppe Barbera; Nicolò Fragile | 10 | |
| "Il diluvio universale" | Annalisa | Diego Calvetti; Annalisa Scarrone | Diego Calvetti | 11 | |
| "Vincere l'odio" | Elio e le Storie Tese | Stefano "Elio" Belisari; Sergio "Rocco Tanica" Conforti; Davide "Cesareo" Civaschi; Nicola "Faso" Fasani | Peppe Vessicchio; Vittorio Cosma | 12 | |
| "Finalmente piove" | Valerio Scanu | Fabrizio Moro | Peppe Vessicchio | 13 | |
| "Noi siamo infinito" | Alessio Bernabei | Roberto Casalino; Ivan Amatucci; Dario "Dardust" Faini | Umberto Iervolino | 14 | |
| "Ora o mai più (le cose cambiano)" | Dolcenera | Emanuela "Dolcenera" Trane; Alessandro "Finaz" Finazzo | Enzo Campagnoli | 15 | |
| "Blu" | Irene Fornaciari | Irene Fornaciari; Diego Calvetti; Giuseppe "Beppe" Dati; Marco Fontana | Diego Calvetti | 16 | |
| "Di me e di te" | Zero Assoluto | Thomas De Gasperi; Matteo Maffucci; Antonio Filippelli; Luca Vicini | Adriano Pennino | Eliminated | |
| "Semplicemente" | Bluvertigo | Marco "Morgan" Castoldi | Carlo Carcano | Eliminated | |
| "Sogni e nostalgia" | Neffa | Giovanni "Neffa" Pellino | Peppe Vessicchio | Eliminated | |
| "Mezzo respiro" | Dear Jack | Roberto Balbo; Stefano Paviani; Leiner Riflessi; Claudio; Corradini | Diego Calvetti | Eliminated | |
Newcomers' section
| Song | Artist(s) | Songwriter(s) | Orchestra conductor | Rank | Sanremo Music Festival Awards |
| "Amen" | Francesco Gabbani | Francesco Gabbani; Fabio Ilacqua | Vince Tempera | 1 | Winner of the Newcomers' section - Silver Lion; Critics' Award "Mia Martini"; "Sergio Bardotti" Award for Best Lyrics; "Emanuele Luzzati" Award |
| "Introverso" | Chiara Dello Iacovo | Chiara Dello Iacovo | Massimo Morini | 2 | Press, Radio, TV & Web Award "Lucio Dalla"; "Assomusica" Award for Best Performance |
| "Odio le favole" | Ermal Meta | Ermal Meta | Massimo Morini | 3 | |
| "Dimentica" | Mahmood | Alessandro "Mahmood" Mahmoud | Andrea Rodini | 4 | |
| "N.E.G.R.A" | Cecile | Lorenzo Lombardi Dallamano | Lorenzo Lombardi Dallamano | Eliminated | |
| "Cosa resterà" | Irama | Filippo Maria Fanti; Giulio Nenna | Giulio Nenna | Eliminated | |
| "Rinascerai" | Michael Leonardi | Michael Leonardi; Emanuela Giacca; Emilio Rentocchini | Daniele Parziani | Eliminated | |
| "Metre ti parlo" | Miele | Manuela "Miele" Paruzzo, Andrea Rodini | Massimo Zanotti | Eliminated | |

== Shows ==
=== First evening ===
The first evening on 9 February featured ten of the twenty acts competing in the Big Artists section presenting their songs. The bottom four entries at risk of elimination were revealed in alphabetical order. In addition to the performances of the competing entries, guest performers included Laura Pausini, Elton John and Maître Gims. Other guests for the show included the comedy trio Aldo, Giovanni and Giacomo, athlete Giuseppe Ottaviani and actresses Kasia Smutniak and Anna Foglietta.

All results during the first evening were determined by the combination of public voting (50%) and the votes from the press jury (50%). While none of the entries competing in the Big Artists section were eliminated during this evening, the results were part of an overall ranking compiled from the scores each entry receives during the first and second evenings and accounted for 50% of the results during the fourth evening.

Big Artists

At risk of elimination

| R/O | Artist | Song | Votes | | | Place |
| R/O | Artist | Song | Press Jury (50%) | Public (50%) | Total | Place |
|---|---|---|---|---|---|---|
| 1 | Lorenzo Fragola | "Infinite volte" | 6.30% | 13.79% | 10.04% | 5 |
| 2 | Noemi | "La borsa di una donna" | 13.17% | 5.91% | 9.54% | 7 |
| 3 | Dear Jack | "Mezzo respiro" | 3.44% | 8.83% | 6.13% | 10 |
| 4 | Giovanni Caccamo & Deborah Iurato | "Via da qui" | 8.02% | 16.09% | 12.05% | 2 |
| 5 | Stadio | "Un giorno mi dirai" | 12.79% | 10.65% | 11.72% | 3 |
| 6 | Arisa | "Guardando il cielo" | 13.17% | 6.78% | 9.98% | 6 |
| 7 | Enrico Ruggeri | "Il primo amore non si scorda mai" | 13.93% | 8.41% | 11.17% | 4 |
| 8 | Bluvertigo | "Semplicemente" | 6.68% | 5.62% | 6.15% | 9 |
| 9 | Rocco Hunt | "Wake Up" | 15.46% | 16.58% | 16.02% | 1 |
| 10 | Irene Fornaciari | "Blu" | 7.06% | 7.34% | 7.20% | 8 |

=== Second evening ===
The second evening on 10 February featured the song presentations of the remaining ten acts competing in the Big Artists section. The bottom four entries at risk of elimination were revealed in alphabetical order. The first two semi-final duels for the artists competing in the Newcomers' section also took place where the two winners of the duels proceeded to the final on the fourth evening. In addition to the performances of the competing entries, guest performers included Eros Ramazzotti, Ezio Bosso, Ellie Goulding and Salut Salon. Other guests for the show included actress Nicole Kidman, actor and comedian Nino Frassica and chef Antonino Cannavacciuolo.

All results during the second evening were determined by the combination of public voting (50%) and votes from the press jury (50%). While none of the entries competing in the Big Artists section were eliminated during this evening, the results were part of an overall ranking compiled from the scores each entry receives during the first and second evenings and accounted for 50% of the results during the fourth evening.

Big Artists

At risk of elimination

| R/O | Artist | Song | Votes | | | Place |
| R/O | Artist | Song | Press Jury (50%) | Public (50%) | Total | Place |
|---|---|---|---|---|---|---|
| 1 | Dolcenera | "Ora o mai più (le cose cambiano)" | 13.74% | 4.79% | 9.27% | 8 |
| 2 | Clementino | "Quando sono lontano" | 5.92% | 15.50% | 10.71% | 5 |
| 3 | Patty Pravo | "Cieli immensi" | 12.79% | 12.07% | 12.43% | 2 |
| 4 | Valerio Scanu | "Finalmente piove" | 5.73% | 20.31% | 13.02% | 1 |
| 5 | Francesca Michielin | "Nessun grado di separazione" | 13.74% | 7.92% | 10.83% | 4 |
| 6 | Alessio Bernabei | "Noi siamo infinito" | 5.92% | 12.64% | 9.28% | 7 |
| 7 | Elio e le Storie Tese | "Vincere l'odio" | 14.50% | 5.96% | 10.23% | 6 |
| 8 | Neffa | "Sogni e nostalgia" | 6.30% | 2.35% | 4.32% | 10 |
| 9 | Annalisa | "Il diluvio universale" | 12.21% | 11.06% | 11.64% | 3 |
| 10 | Zero Assoluto | "Di me e di te" | 9.16% | 7.41% | 8.28% | 9 |

Newcomers' – semi-final

Qualifies to the final

| Duel | R/O | Artist | Song | Votes | | | Place |
| Duel | R/O | Artist | Song | Press Jury (50%) | Public (50%) | Total | Place |
|---|---|---|---|---|---|---|---|
| I | 1 | Chiara Dello Iacovo | "Introverso" | 58.12% | 69.43% | 63.78% | 1 |
| I | 2 | Cecile | "N.E.G.R.A." | 41.88% | 30.57% | 36.22% | 2 |
| II | 1 | Irama | "Cosa resterà" | 18.64% | 63.44% | 41.04% | 2 |
| II | 2 | Ermal Meta | "Odio le favole" | 81.36% | 36.56% | 58.96% | 1 |

=== Third evening ===
The third evening on 11 February featured the twenty acts competing in the Big Artists section performing cover versions of either Italian songs or international hit songs that have been translated into Italian. The competing acts had an option to perform their cover together with a guest artist. The winning cover version was determined over two rounds of voting. In the first round, the covers initially competed in five groups consisting of four entries each. The winning cover of each group qualified to the second round where the winner of the best cover prize was determined. The winner was Stadio who performed a cover of the song "La sera dei miracoli" originally performed by Lucio Dalla. The last two semi-final duels for the artists competing in the Newcomers' section also took place where the two winners of the duels proceeded to the final on the fourth evening. In addition to the performances of the competing entries, guest performers included Pooh and Hozier. Other guests for the show included author and director Marc Hollogne, athlete Nicole Orlando and comedians Michele and Stefano Manca.

All results during the third evening were determined by the combination of public voting (50%) and votes from the press jury (50%). During the first Newcomers' semi-final duel, "Mentre ti parlo", performed by Miele, was originally announced as the winner with 53% of the votes. However, later in the evening Carlo Conti announced that there was a mistake in the press jury vote and a re-vote resulted in the victory of "Amen" performed by Francesco Gabbani with 50.8% of the votes. Miele performed her song again in the fourth evening as a consolation prize.

Big Artists – Cover Competition – first round

Group winner: Advanced to second round

| Group | R/O | Artist | Song (Original artist) | Votes | | | Place |
| Group | R/O | Artist | Song (Original artist) | Press Jury (50%) | Public (50%) | Total | Place |
|---|---|---|---|---|---|---|---|
| I | 1 | Noemi | "Dedicato" (Loredana Bertè) | 40.95% | 25.74% | 33.35% | 1 |
| I | 2 | Dear Jack | "Un bacio a mezzanotte" (Quartetto Cetra) | 15.24% | 27.27% | 21.25% | 3 |
| I | 3 | Zero Assoluto | "Goldrake" (Actarus) | 12.86% | 13.83% | 13.34% | 4 |
| I | 4 | Giovanni Caccamo & Deborah Iurato | "Amore senza fine" (Pino Daniele) | 30.95% | 33.16% | 32.06% | 2 |
| II | 1 | Patty Pravo & Fred De Palma | "Tutt'al più" (Patty Pravo) | 20.25% | 15.02% | 17.63% | 3 |
| II | 2 | Alessio Bernabei & Benji & Fede | "A mano a mano" (Riccardo Cocciante) | 8.68% | 54.28% | 31.48% | 2 |
| II | 3 | Dolcenera | "Amore disperato" (Nada) | 26.03% | 9.05% | 17.54% | 4 |
| II | 4 | Clementino | "Don Raffaè" (Fabrizio De André) | 45.04% | 21.66% | 33.35% | 1 |
| III | 1 | Elio e le Storie Tese | "Quinto ripensamento"^{[a]} (Walter Murphy) | 17.36% | 17.20% | 17.28% | 4 |
| III | 2 | Arisa | "Cuore" (Rita Pavone) | 18.18% | 20.22% | 19.20% | 3 |
| III | 3 | Rocco Hunt | "Tu vuò fà l'americano" (Renato Carosone) | 30.99% | 39.74% | 35.37% | 1 |
| III | 4 | Francesca Michielin | "Il mio canto libero" (Lucio Battisti) | 33.47% | 22.84% | 28.16% | 2 |
| IV | 1 | Neffa & the Bluebeaters | "'O sarracino" (Renato Carosone) | 21.74% | 8.12% | 14.93% | 4 |
| IV | 2 | Valerio Scanu | "Io vivrò (senza te)" (Lucio Battisti) | 27.39% | 65.72% | 46.55% | 1 |
| IV | 3 | Irene Fornaciari | "Se perdo anche te" (Gianni Morandi) | 21.74% | 8.98% | 15.36% | 3 |
| IV | 4 | Bluvertigo | "La lontananza" (Domenico Modugno) | 29.13% | 17.19% | 23.16% | 2 |
| V | 1 | Lorenzo Fragola | "La donna cannone" (Francesco De Gregori) | 17.80% | 35.78% | 26.79% | 3 |
| V | 2 | Enrico Ruggeri | " A' canzuncella" (Alunni del Sole) | 12.29% | 10.34% | 11.31% | 4 |
| V | 3 | Annalisa | "America" (Gianna Nannini) | 25.85% | 34.47% | 30.16% | 2 |
| V | 4 | Stadio | "La sera dei miracoli" (Lucio Dalla) | 44.07% | 19.42% | 31.74% | 1 |

Big Artists – Cover Competition – second round

Winner
Second place
Third place

| R/O | Artist | Song (Original artist) | Votes | | | Place |
| R/O | Artist | Song (Original artist) | Press Jury (50%) | Public (50%) | Total | Place |
|---|---|---|---|---|---|---|
| 1 | Noemi | "Dedicato" (Loredana Bertè) | 19.57% | 11.80% | 15.68% | 4 |
| 2 | Clementino | "Don Raffaè" (Fabrizio De André) | 18.26% | 19.17% | 18.72% | 3 |
| 3 | Rocco Hunt | "Tu vuò fà l'americano" (Renato Carosone) | 20.00% | 10.34% | 15.17% | 5 |
| 4 | Valerio Scanu | "Io vivrò (senza te)" (Lucio Battisti) | 10.00% | 31.59% | 20.80% | 2 |
| 5 | Stadio | "La sera dei miracoli" (Lucio Dalla) | 32.17% | 27.09% | 29.63% | 1 |

Newcomers' – semi-final

Qualified to the final

| Duel | R/O | Artist | Song | Votes | | | Place |
| Duel | R/O | Artist | Song | Press Jury (50%) | Public (50%) | Total | Place |
|---|---|---|---|---|---|---|---|
| I | 1 | Miele | "Mentre ti parlo" | 28.15% | 70.20% | 49.17% | 2 |
| I | 2 | Francesco Gabbani | "Amen" | 71.85% | 29.80% | 50.83% | 1 |
| II | 1 | Michael Leonardi | "Rinascerai" | 26.45% | 40.42% | 33.43% | 2 |
| II | 2 | Mahmood | "Dimentica" | 73.55% | 59.58% | 66.57% | 1 |

=== Fourth evening ===
The fourth evening on 12 February featured performances of all twenty entries by the acts competing in the Big Artists section. The top fifteen entries advanced to the fifth evening, while the bottom five competed in a repechage round to determine one more qualifier; four of the entries were ultimately eliminated from the competition. The final of the Newcomers' section also took place during this evening where the four semi-final duel winners competed to determine the overall winner of the Newcomers' section. "Amen" performed by Francesco Gabbani was the winner. In addition to the performances of the competing entries, guest performers included Elisa, J Balvin and Lost Frequencies. Other guests for the show include actors Enrico Brignano, Alessandro Gassmann and Rocco Papaleo. One of the eliminated entries from the Newcomers' section, "Mentre ti parlo" by Miele, was performed again as a consolation prize after the entry was mistakenly announced as a finalist due to a voting error in the third evening.

All results for the Newcomers' section and a portion of the results for the Big Artists section during this evening were determined by the combination of public televoting (40%), the votes of the expert jury (30%) and the votes of the demoscopic poll (30%). In the Big Artists section, to determine the top fifteen, the weighted average of the votes from the first and second evenings as well as the votes from the fourth evening were combined to produce an overall ranking. The results of the repechage round were determined solely by a public vote that commenced during the fourth evening and concluded the following day with the result announced during the fifth evening.

Big Artists – semi-final

Repechage contestant

| R/O | Artist | Song | First and Second Evening Votes (50%) | Fourth Evening Votes (50%) | | | | Overall Total | Place |
| R/O | Artist | Song | First and Second Evening Votes (50%) | Demoscopic Poll (30%) | Expert Jury (30%) | Public (40%) | Total | Overall Total | Place |
|---|---|---|---|---|---|---|---|---|---|
| 1 | Annalisa | "Il diluvio universale" | 5.82% | 6.05% | 0.63% | 5.49% | 4.20% | 5.01% | 10 |
| 2 | Zero Assoluto | "Di me e di te" | 4.14% | 4.05% | 4.38% | 2.64% | 3.59% | 3.86% | 16 |
| 3 | Rocco Hunt | "Wake Up" | 8.01% | 5.02% | 6.25% | 7.55% | 6.40% | 7.20% | 2 |
| 4 | Irene Fornaciari | "Blu" | 3.60% | 3.50% | 5.63% | 2.90% | 3.90% | 3.75% | 17 |
| 5 | Giovanni Caccamo & Deborah Iurato | "Via da qui" | 6.03% | 5.42% | 5.63% | 8.76% | 6.82% | 6.42% | 4 |
| 6 | Enrico Ruggeri | "Il primo amore non si scorda mai" | 5.59% | 6.55% | 10.00% | 4.45% | 6.75% | 6.17% | 5 |
| 7 | Francesca Michielin | "Nessun grado di separazione" | 5.42% | 8.22% | 10.63% | 6.01% | 8.06% | 6.74% | 3 |
| 8 | Elio e le Storie Tese | "Vincere l'odio" | 5.12% | 5.97% | 5.63% | 1.90% | 4.24% | 4.68% | 11 |
| 9 | Patty Pravo | "Cieli immensi" | 6.21% | 5.10% | 4.38% | 7.00% | 5.64% | 5.93% | 6 |
| 10 | Alessio Bernabei | "Noi siamo infinito" | 4.64% | 2.68% | 0.00% | 7.80% | 3.92% | 4.28% | 14 |
| 11 | Neffa | "Sogni e nostalgia" | 2.16% | 3.62% | 8.75% | 1.36% | 4.26% | 3.21% | 19 |
| 12 | Valerio Scanu | "Finalmente piove" | 6.51% | 3.05% | 0.63% | 9.13% | 4.76% | 5.63% | 7 |
| 13 | Dear Jack | "Mezzo respiro" | 3.07% | 2.78% | 0.63% | 3.58% | 2.46% | 2.76% | 20 |
| 14 | Noemi | "La borsa di una donna" | 4.77% | 7.02% | 6.88% | 4.34% | 5.91% | 5.34% | 8 |
| 15 | Stadio | "Un giorno mi dirai" | 5.86% | 7.88% | 10.00% | 8.09% | 8.60% | 7.23% | 1 |
| 16 | Arisa | "Guardando il cielo" | 4.99% | 5.88% | 3.13% | 2.55% | 3.72% | 4.36% | 13 |
| 17 | Lorenzo Fragola | "Infinite volte" | 5.02% | 5.13% | 2.50% | 4.79% | 4.21% | 4.61% | 12 |
| 18 | Bluvertigo | "Semplicemente" | 3.07% | 1.97% | 7.50% | 2.03% | 3.65% | 3.36% | 18 |
| 19 | Dolcenera | "Ora o mai più (le cose cambiano)" | 4.63% | 6.03% | 3.13% | 2.72% | 3.84% | 4.23% | 15 |
| 20 | Clementino | "Quando sono lontano" | 5.35% | 4.08% | 3.75% | 6.91% | 5.11% | 5.23% | 9 |

Newcomers' – Final

Winner
Second place
Third place

| R/O | Artist | Song | Votes | | | | Place |
| R/O | Artist | Song | Demoscopic Poll (30%) | Expert Jury (30%) | Public (40%) | Total | Place |
|---|---|---|---|---|---|---|---|
| 1 | Mahmood | "Dimentica" | 12.67% | 18.75% | 11.23% | 13.92% | 4 |
| 2 | Francesco Gabbani | "Amen" | 29.17% | 43.75% | 50.39% | 42.03% | 1 |
| 3 | Chiara Dello Iacovo | "Introverso" | 36.00% | 31.25% | 23.99% | 29.77% | 2 |
| 4 | Ermal Meta | "Odio le favole" | 22.17% | 6.25% | 14.39% | 14.28% | 3 |

=== Fifth evening ===
The fifth evening on 13 February concluded the competition by determining the winner of the Big Artists section. Sixteen entries competed: the fifteen entries that qualified from the fourth evening and the winner of the repechage round. The winner of the repechage round was "Blu" performed by Irene Fornaciari. The overall winner of the Big Artists section was determined over two rounds of voting. In the first round, the top three entries from the sixteen competing entries advance to the second round of voting. The three entries were "Nessun grado di separazione" performed by Francesca Michielin, "Un giorno mi dirai" performed by Stadio and "Via da qui" performed by Giovanni Caccamo and Deborah Iurato. In the second round, the winner was "Un giorno mi dirai" performed by Stadio.

Results for the two rounds of voting held for the final were determined through the combination of public televoting (40%), the votes of the expert jury (30%) and the votes of the demoscopic poll (30%).

In addition to the performances of the competing entries, guest performers included Renato Zero, Cristina D'Avena and Willy William. Other guests included ballet dancer Roberto Bolle and actors Guglielmo Scilla and Giuseppe Fiorello. The winner of the Newcomers' section Francesco Gabbani also performed his song "Amen".

Big Artists – Repechage

Finalist

| R/O | Artist | Song | Public (100%) | Place |
|---|---|---|---|---|
| 1 | Zero Assoluto | "Di me e di te" | 14.40% | 4 |
| 2 | Irene Fornaciari | "Blu" | 31.46% | 1 |
| 3 | Neffa | "Sogni e nostalgia" | 9.97% | 5 |
| 4 | Dear Jack | "Mezzo respiro" | 29.08% | 2 |
| 5 | Bluvertigo | "Semplicemente" | 15.09% | 3 |

Big Artists – final – first round

Advanced to second round

| R/O | Artist | Song | Votes | | | | Place |
| R/O | Artist | Song | Demoscopic Poll (30%) | Expert Jury (30%) | Public (40%) | Total | Place |
|---|---|---|---|---|---|---|---|
| 1 | Francesca Michielin | "Nessun grado di separazione" | 9.72% | 6.88% | 8.17% | 8.25% | 2 |
| 2 | Alessio Bernabei | "Noi siamo infinito" | 3.12% | 0.00% | 8.05% | 4.16% | 14 |
| 3 | Clementino | "Quando sono lontano" | 4.22% | 3.75% | 7.80% | 5.51% | 7 |
| 4 | Patty Pravo | "Cieli immensi" | 5.98% | 3.75% | 8.23% | 6.21% | 6 |
| 5 | Lorenzo Fragola | "Infinite volte" | 5.93% | 2.50% | 9.40% | 6.29% | 5 |
| 6 | Noemi | "La borsa di una donna" | 8.03% | 4.38% | 4.12% | 5.37% | 8 |
| 7 | Elio e le Storie Tese | "Vincere l'odio" | 6.13% | 4.38% | 2.66% | 4.22% | 12 |
| 8 | Arisa | "Guardando il cielo" | 7.20% | 3.13% | 3.73% | 4.59% | 10 |
| 9 | Stadio | "Un giorno mi dirai" | 10.57% | 45.00% | 10.30% | 20.79% | 1 |
| 10 | Annalisa | "Il diluvio universale" | 6.52% | 0.63% | 5.45% | 4.32% | 11 |
| 11 | Rocco Hunt | "Wake Up" | 6.00% | 1.25% | 7.43% | 5.15% | 9 |
| 12 | Dolcenera | "Ora o mai più (le cose cambiano)" | 6.38% | 1.88% | 2.39% | 3.43% | 15 |
| 13 | Enrico Ruggeri | "Il primo amore non si scorda mai" | 7.52% | 8.75% | 3.62% | 6.33% | 4 |
| 14 | Giovanni Caccamo & Deborah Iurato | "Via da qui" | 6.32% | 10.63% | 7.85% | 8.22% | 3 |
| 15 | Valerio Scanu | "Finalmente piove" | 2.95% | 0.00% | 8.20% | 4.17% | 13 |
| 16 | Irene Fornaciari | "Blu" | 3.42% | 3.13% | 2.60% | 3.00% | 16 |

Big Artists – final – second round

Winner
Second place
Third place

| R/O | Artist | Song | Votes | | | | Place |
| R/O | Artist | Song | Demoscopic Poll (30%) | Expert Jury (30%) | Public (40%) | Total | Place |
|---|---|---|---|---|---|---|---|
| 1 | Giovanni Caccamo & Deborah Iurato | "Via da qui" | 29.39% | 25.00% | 26.43% | 26.89% | 3 |
| 2 | Francesca Michielin | "Nessun grado di separazione" | 34.72% | 27.08% | 29.58% | 30.37% | 2 |
| 3 | Stadio | "Un giorno mi dirai" | 35.89% | 47.92% | 43.99% | 42.74% | 1 |

== Awards and prizes ==
The winning artist(s) in both the Big Artists and Newcomers' sections are awarded prizes for their victories. In addition, other awards are presented during the competition such as awards for the best lyrics and the best musical arrangement. These awards are decided upon by select groups of experts and journalists as well as members of the performing orchestra. The winning artist(s) in the Big Artists category also won the right to represent Italy at the Eurovision Song Contest 2016. As Stadio refused the offer to participate at the Eurovision Song Contest, the organisers of the event chose runner-up Francesca Michielin as the Eurovision entrant via their own criteria.

Big Artists

- Winner of the Big Artists section for the 66th edition of the Sanremo Music Festival: Stadio – "Un giorno mi dirai"
- Best Cover Version Award: Stadio – "La sera dei miracoli" (originally by Lucio Dalla)
- Eurovision Song Contest 2016 entrant: Francesca Michielin
- Giancarlo Bigazzi Best Music Award: Stadio – "La sera dei miracoli"
- Mia Martini Critics Award: Patty Pravo – "Cieli immensi"

Mia Martini Critics Award Voting Results
| Artist | Song | Votes |
|---|---|---|
| Patty Pravo | "Cieli immensi" | 18 |
| Elio e le Storie Tese | "Vincere l'Odio" | 17 |
| Stadio | "Un giorno mi dirai" | 16 |

- Lucio Dalla Radio-TV-Web Award: Stadio – "Un giorno mi dirai"

Lucio Dalla Radio-TV-Web Award Voting Results
| Artist | Song | Votes |
|---|---|---|
| Stadio | "Un giorno mi dirai" | 19 |
| Rocco Hunt | "Wake Up" | 15 |
| Annalisa | "Il diluvio universale" | 12 |
| Elio e le Storie Tese | "Vincere l'odio" | 11 |
| Enrico Ruggeri | "Il primo amore non si scorda mai" | 11 |
| Noemi | "La borsa di una donna" | 10 |
| Francesca Michielin | "Nessun grado di separazione" | 8 |
| Clementino | "Quando sono lontano" | 7 |
| Irene Fornaciari | "Blu" | 6 |
| Valerio Scanu | "Finalmente piove" | 5 |
| Arisa | "Guardando il cielo" | 4 |
| Giovanni Caccamo & Deborah Iurato | "Via da qui" | 4 |
| Patty Pravo | "Cieli immensi" | 4 |
| Dolcenera | "Ora o mai più (le cose cambiano)" | 3 |
| Lorenzo Fragola | "Infinite volte" | 3 |
| Alessio Bernabei | "Noi siamo infinito" | 2 |
| Zero Assoluto | "Di me e di te" | 2 |
| Bluvertigo | "Semplicemente" | 1 |
| Dear Jack | "Mezzo respiro" | 1 |
| Neffa | "Sogni e nostalgia" | 1 |

Newcomers'

- Winner of the Newcomers' section for the 66th edition of the Sanremo Music Festival: Francesco Gabbani – "Amen"
- Emanuele Luzzati Newcomers' section Award: Francesco Gabbani – "Amen"
- Sergio Bardotti Best Lyrics Award: Francesco Gabbani – "Amen"
- Assomusica Award for Best Live Performance: Chiara Dello Iacovo – "Introverso"
- Mia Martini Critics Award: Francesco Gabbani – "Amen"

Mia Martini Critics Award Voting Results
| Artist | Song | Votes |
|---|---|---|
| Francesco Gabbani | "Amen" | 27 |
| Cecile | "N.E.G.R.A." | 21 |
| Chiara Dello Iacovo | "Introverso" | 16 |
| Ermal Meta | "Odio le favole" | 16 |
| Miele | "Mentre ti parlo" | 13 |
| Mahmood | "Dimentica" | 7 |
| Irama | "Cosa resterà" | 5 |
All other entries did not receive any votes.

- Lucio Dalla Radio-TV-Web Award: Chiara Dello Iacovo – "Introverso"

Lucio Dalla Radio-TV-Web Award Voting Results
| Artist | Song | Votes |
|---|---|---|
| Chiara Dello Iacovo | "Introverso" | 41 |
| Francesco Gabbani | "Amen" | 26 |
| Miele | "Mentre ti parlo" | 22 |
| Ermal Meta | "Odio le favole" | 16 |
| Cecile | "N.E.G.R.A." | 7 |
| Mahmood | "Dimentica" | 7 |
| Michael Leonardi | "Rinascerai" | 6 |
| Irama | "Cosa resterà" | 1 |

== Broadcast and ratings ==
=== Local broadcast ===
Rai 1 and Rai Radio 2 carried the official broadcasts of the festival in Italy. Commentators for the Rai Radio 2 broadcast were Pif, Andrea Delogu and Michele Astori. The five evenings were also streamed online via the broadcaster's official website rai.it. In addition, the radio stations Radio Italia and RTL 102.5 also broadcast the event.

| Broadcast | Part 1 | | Part 2 | | Average | |
| Broadcast | Viewers | Share | Viewers | Share | Viewers | Share |
|---|---|---|---|---|---|---|
| 9 February 2016 | 12,516,000 | 49.15% | 5,907,000 | 52.31% | 11,134,000 | 49.48% |
| 10 February 2016 | 12,390,000 | 49.19% | 6,357,000 | 54.03% | 10,748,000 | 49.91% |
| 11 February 2016 | 12,033,000 | 45.91% | 6,821,000 | 58.04% | 10,462,000 | 47.88% |
| 12 February 2016 | 12,201,000 | 46.05% | 6,414,000 | 55.2% | 10,164,000 | 47.81% |
| 13 February 2016 | 12,695,000 | 48.76% | 8,712,000 | 64.89% | 11,222,128 | 52.52% |
| Average viewership | | | | | 10,746,000 | 49.52% |

=== International broadcast ===
The international television service Rai Italia broadcast the competition in the Americas, Africa, Asia and Australia. In addition, the fifth evening was broadcast online via the official Eurovision Song Contest website eurovision.tv. The following television channels and radio stations also broadcast the event:

- Canada – CHIN-FM

== See also ==
- Italy in the Eurovision Song Contest 2016

== Notes and references ==
=== Notes ===
1. Italian language version of the song "A Fifth of Beethoven", a disco adaptation from the first movement of Beethoven's Fifth Symphony.
