= Lontano (Francesca Michielin song) =

Single by Francesca Michielin

from the album di20
- Released: 25 September 2015
- Recorded: 2014
- Genre: Pop
- Length: 3:06
- Label: Sony Music Entertainment Italy
- Songwriter: Fortunato Zampaglione
- Producer: Michele Canova

Francesca Michielin singles chronology
"Battito di ciglia" (2015)	"Lontano" (2015)	"Nessun grado di separazione" (2016)

"Lontano" is a song performed by Italian singer Francesca Michielin. It was written by Fortunato Zampaglione and produced by Michele Canova. The song was released as a digital download on 25 September 2015 through Sony Music Entertainment Italy as the third single from her second studio album di20 (2015). The song peaked at number 99 on the Italian Singles Chart.

== Music video ==
A music video to accompany the release of "Lontano" was first released on YouTube on 2 October 2015 at a total length of three minutes and fourteen seconds. It was directed by Giacomo Triglia who also directed Michielin's two previous music videos, L'amore esiste and Battito di ciglia.

== Track listing ==
Digital download
No.	Title	Length
1.	"Lontano"	3:06

== Charts ==
Chart (2015)	Peak position
Italy (FIMI)	99

== Release history ==
Region	Date	Format	Label
Italy	25 September 2015	Digital download	Sony Music Entertainment Italy
