= Di20 =

di20

Studio album by Francesca Michielin
- Released: 23 October 2015
- Recorded: 2014/15; Kaneepa Studios (Milan and Hollywood, California); Officine Meccaniche (Uboldo, Milan)
- Genres: Pop; synth pop
- Length: 39:16
- Label: Sony Music Italy
- Producer: Michele Canova

Francesca Michielin chronology
Riflessi di me (2012)	di20 (2015)	Nice to Meet You (Acoustic Live Solo) (2016)

Singles from di20
- 1. "L'amore esiste" Released: 6 March 2015; 2. "Battito di ciglia" Released: 10 July 2015; 3. "Lontano" Released: 25 September 2015; 4. "Nessun grado di separazione" Released: 11 February 2016; 5. "Un cuore in due" Released: 3 June 2016; 6. "Almeno tu" Released: 23 September 2016

di20 (to be read diventi, Italian for "you become", a pun on the age of the artist on its release date) is the second studio album by Italian singer Francesca Michielin, released by Sony Music Italy on 23 October 2015 and produced by Michele Canova. A new edition of the album was released on 19 February 2016 with the title di20are and four new tracks, including the single Nessun grado di separazione.

== Track listing ==
=== di20 ===
No.	Title	Writer(s)	Length
1.	"diVento"	Francesca Michielin; Patrizio Simonini	3:36
2.	"L'amore esiste"	Fortunato Zampaglione; Michele Canova	3:32
3.	"Almeno tu"	Michielin; Colin Munroe; April Bender	3:24
4.	"Lontano"	Zampaglione	3:06
5.	"Amazing"	Michielin; Negin Djafari; Fausto Cogliati	3:31
6.	"Tutto questo vento"	Michielin, Giovanni Caccamo; Federica Abbate; Gianclaudia Franchini	3:47
7.	"Battito di ciglia"	Michielin; Zampaglione; Canova	3:38
8.	"Un cuore in due"	Michielin; Abbate; Ermal Meta; Matteo Buzzanca	3:32
9.	"Io e te"	Michielin; Massimiliano Pelan; Fabio De Martino	3:28
10.	"Sons and Daughters"	Viktoria Hansen	3:55
11.	"25 febbraio"	Michielin	3:47

=== di20are ===
No.	Title	Writer(s)	Length
1.	"Nessun grado di separazione"	Michielin; Abbate; Alfredo Rapetti; Fabio Gargiulo	3:39
2.	"L'amore esiste"	Zampaglione; Canova	3:32
3.	"Lontano"	Zampaglione	3:06
4.	"Amazing"	Michielin; Djafari; Cogliati	3:27
5.	"È con te"	Rapetti; Abbate	3:39
6.	"Almeno tu"	Michielin; Munroe; Bender	3:24
7.	"Tutto questo vento"	Michielin; Abbate; Caccamo; Franchini	3:47
8.	"Tutto è magnifico"	Roberto Casalino; Dario Faini	3:24
9.	"Un cuore in due"	Michielin; Abbate; Meta; Buzzanca	3:32
10.	"Battito di ciglia"	Michielin; Zampaglione; Canova	3:38
11.	"25 febbraio"	Michielin	3:47
12.	"Io e te"	Michielin; Pelan; De Martino	3:28
13.	"Sons and Daughters"	Viktoria Hansen	3:54
14.	"diVento"	Michielin; Simonini	3:35
15.	"Nice to Meet You (Acoustic Live Solo)"	Michielin	4:18

== Chart performance ==
=== di20 ===
Chart (2015)	Peak position
Italian Albums (FIMI)	5

=== di20are ===
Chart (2016)	Peak position
Italian Albums (FIMI)	3
Swiss Albums (Schweizer Hitparade)	96

=== Year-end charts ===
Chart (2016)	Position
Italian Albums (FIMI)	55

== Certifications ==
Region	Certification	Certified units/sales
Italy (FIMI)	Platinum	50,000^{‡}
^{‡} Sales+streaming figures based on certification alone.
