= Giovanni Caccamo =

Italian singer-songwriter (born 1990)

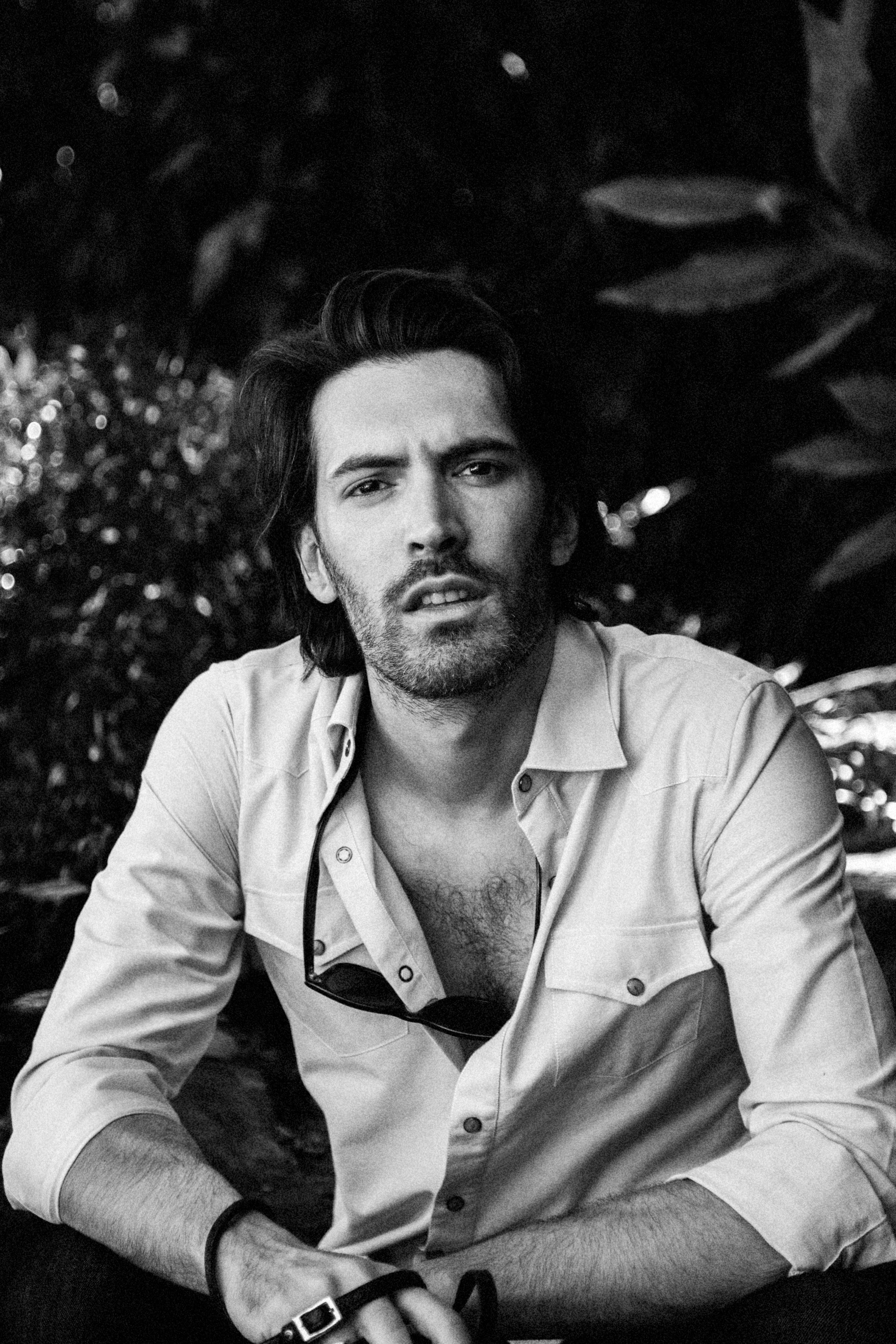
- Caccamo in 2021

Background information
- Born: 8 December 1990 (age 35); Modica, Sicily, Italy
- Genres: Pop
- Occupations: Singer; songwriter
- Years active: 2012–present
- Label: Sugar Music
- Website: giovannicaccamo.it

Giovanni Caccamo (born 8 December 1990) is an Italian singer and songwriter. After being discovered by singer Franco Battiato and producer Caterina Caselli, he won the newcomers' section of the Sanremo Music Festival 2015, with the song "Ritornerò da te", and released his debut album, Qui per te.

He has also worked as a television presenter, and he dubbed the character Uku in the Italian version of Pixar's short film Lava. As a songwriter, he has penned songs for Italian recording artists Malika Ayane, Francesca Michielin and Emma Marrone.

== Early life ==
A native of Modica, Sicily, Giovanni Caccamo started singing as a child. In 2001, during a Zecchino d'Oro TV special celebrating Mother's Day, he performed as part of the Piccolo Coro dell'Antoniano, a children's choir from Bologna.

== Career ==
In 2009, Caccamo began working in RAI, as part of the cast of the Rai Gulp show Music Gate, produced by Rai Ragazzi and the Institute of Antoniano.

In the summer of 2012, he met Franco Battiato and opened some of his tours, including special shows with Antony and the Johnsons.

On 15 August 2013, he released his first single, "L'indifferenza" written by himself and produced by Franco Battiato and Pino Pinaxa Pischetola.

From November 2013, he started performing in several private homes throughout Italy and Europe, singing and playing piano, as part of his Live at Home Tour. The initiative was taken in March 2015 in anticipation as part of the official tour of Qui Per Te. During that time, he was part of the radio show Edicola Fiore hosted by Rosario Fiorello.

In October 2014, he signed a recording contract with Sugar Music.

In 2015, he competed in the 65th edition of the Sanremo Festival and won in the newcomers' section with the song "Ritornerò da te". He also received the "Mia Martini Critics" Award, the Emanuele Luzzati prize, and the Sherman Press Award (Press Radio-TV). The song anticipated his first studio album Qui per te, which peaked at number 29 on the Italian Albums Chart. During 2015 Caccamo wrote songs for Emma Marrone, Francesca Michielin, Deborah Iurato and Malika Ayane.

In January 2016, Caccamo participated at Sanremo Music Festival. The chosen song "Via da qui", a duet with Deborah Iurato, was included on his second studio album Non siamo soli. The album became his second top 30 on FIMI's chart and has collaborations with Federica Abbate, Malika Ayane and Carmen Consoli.

On 26 July 2016, Caccamo participated with Andrea Bocelli, Carly Paoli, and David Foster in "Music For Mercy", an event that celebrated the Jubilee of Mercy at the Roman Forum.

On 10 November 2016, Caccamo's first epistolary novel, "Dialogue with my mother", was published by Rizzoli.

From 19 November to 10 December 2016, he conducted the 59th edition of the Zecchino d'Oro with Francesca Fialdini.

He has since then appeared in many concerts and music festivals, including as an opening act for famed singer Biagio Antonacci. In 2017 he was the lyricist for Elodie's second studio album Tutta colpa mia and for Chiara Galiazzo.

On 14 January 2017, he was appointed Ambassador for UNESCO.

In October 2017, he began his television adventure as a Tutor in the school of "Amici", broadcast on Saturdays on Canale 5 and daily on Real Time.

On 9 February 2018, after his participation in the 68th edition of the Sanremo Festival with the homonymous song "Eterno" and the success of "Puoi fidarti di me", the main theme song of the soundtrack of the movie "Puoi baciare lo sposo" by Alessandro Genovesi, the third album by the Sicilian singer-songwriter is published. The single Eterno has exceeded 8 MLN of views and 4 MLN of streaming, reaping a great success.

On 6 October 2018, he sings for Pope Francis, in the Sala Nervi in Vatican City, on the occasion of the "Synod of Young People".

On 8 February 2019, he is a guest at the Sanremo Festival with Patty Pravo.

His "Eterno Tour" has exceeded 50 performances reaching Lima, Santiago, Rancagua, Tokyo, Budapest, Cairo, Tunis, Algiers.

On 26 April 2020, he represented Italy at the "Pathway to Paris: Earth Day 50" Festival, with Michael Stipe of R.E.M., Patti Smith, Johnny Depp, Flea of Red Hot Chili Peppers, Cat Power, Ben Harper and many other artists. The concert, organized by Jesse Paris Smith and Rebecca Foon, celebrated the 50th anniversary of Earth Day.

On 17 September 2021, he published his fourth studio album, Parola, with many collaborations: Willem Dafoe, Aleida Guevara, Patti Smith, Jesse Paris Smith, Liliana Segre, Michele Placido, Beppe Fiorello. The theme of this concept album is 'Word' – the word that travels between music, prose, cinema, and literature. Each song is introduced by the text that inspired it, read and accompanied by music. The narrative and melody merge into the beginning of each corresponding song.

== Discography ==
=== Studio albums ===
List of studio albums, with selected chart positions and certifications
Title	Album details	Peak chart positions	Certifications
Title	Album details	ITA	Certifications
Qui per te	Released: 10 February 2015; Label: Sugar; Formats: CD, digital download	29	
Non siamo soli	Released: 12 February 2016; Label: Sugar; Formats: CD, download	30	
Eterno	Released: 9 February 2018; Label: Sugar; Formats: CD, download	41	
Parola	Released: 17 September 2021; Label: Ala Bianca; Formats: CD, download	—	

=== Singles ===
List of singles, with chart positions and certifications, showing year released and album name
Title	Year	Peak chart positions	Certification	Album
Title	Year	ITA	Certification	Album
"Mezze verità"	2012	—		Non-album singles
"L'indifferenza"	2013	—		Non-album singles
"Ritornerò da te"	2015	33		Qui per te
"Oltre l'estasi"	2015	—		Qui per te
"Distante dal tempo"	2015	—		Qui per te
"Via da qui" (with Deborah Iurato)	2016	35		Non siamo soli
"Eterno"	2018	50		Eterno
"Bisogno di tutto"	2018	—		Eterno
"Aurora" (with Willem Dafoe)	2021	—		Parola
"Canta" (with Aleida Guevara)	2021	—		Parola
"Il cambiamento" (with Patti Smith & Jesse Paris Smith)	2021	—		Parola

=== Writing credits ===
List of songs written or co-written by Caccamo and performed by other artists
Song and co-writers	Year	Artist	Album
"Adesso e qui (nostalgico presente)"	2015	Malika Ayane	Naïf
"Tutto questo vento"	2015	Francesca Michielin	di20
"Finalmente"	2015	Emma	Adesso
"Da sola"	2015	Deborah Iurato	Sono ancora io
"Sentirò respirare"	2017	Chiara	Nessun posto è casa mia
"Giorni bellissimi"	2017	Elodie	Tutta colpa mia
"Sorrido lo stesso"	2018	Emma	Essere qui
"Pianeti"	2019	Patty Pravo	Red
"A mano disarmata"	2019	Emma	Fortuna
"La mia libertà"	2022	Leo Gassman	La mia libertà
"Cuore sparso"	2022	Giusy Ferreri	Cortometraggi
"Petali"	2022	Simona Molinari	Petali
"Silent Song"	2022	Elisa	Back to the Future live
"You'll be in my heart" (Italian version)	2022	Lang Lang, Andrea Bocelli	Disney book
"Rimani qui"	2024	Andrea Bocelli, Elisa	Duets (30th Anniversary)
"Opera"	2026	Patty Pravo	TBA

== Sanremo Music Festival entries ==
As a singer
Year	Section	Song and writer(s)	Final result	Additional awards
2015	Newcomers	"Ritornerò da te" (Giovanni Caccamo)	Winner	"Emanuele Luzzati" Award; "Mia Martini" Critics' Award; Press, Radio, TV & Web Award "Lucio Dalla"
2016	Big Artists	"Via da qui" (with Deborah Iurato) (Giuliano Sangiorgi)	3rd place	—N/a
2018	Big Artists	"Eterno" (Giovanni Caccamo, Cheope)	10th place	—N/a

As a songwriter
Year	Section	Song and performer(s)	Final result	Additional awards
2015	Big Artists	"Adesso e qui (nostalgico presente)" (Malika Ayane)	3rd place	* "Mia Martini" Critics' Award
2026	Big Artists	"Opera" (Patty Pravo)	TBD	

== Filmography ==
Television and films credits
Year	Film	Role	Notes
2015	Lava	Uku	Voice role – Italian dubbing
