= Battito di ciglia =

Single by Francesca Michielin

from the album di20
- Released: 10 July 2015
- Recorded: 2014
- Genre: Pop
- Length: 3:38
- Label: Sony Music Entertainment Italy
- Songwriter(s): Francesca Michielin; Fortunato Zampaglione; Michele Canova
- Producer(s): Michele Canova

Francesca Michielin singles chronology
| "L'amore esiste" (2015) | "Battito di ciglia" (2015) | "Lontano" (2015) |

"Battito di ciglia" is a song performed by Italian singer Francesca Michielin. The song was released as a digital download on 10 July 2015 through Sony Music Entertainment Italy as the second single from her second studio album di20 (2015). The song peaked at number 64 on the Italian Singles Chart.

== Music video ==
A music video to accompany the release of "Battito di ciglia" was first released onto YouTube on 10 July 2015 at a total length of three minutes and thirty-eight seconds. It was directed by Giacomo Triglia.

== Track listing ==
Digital download
| No. | Title | Length |
|---|---|---|
| 1. | "Battito di ciglia" | 3:38 |

== Charts ==
| Chart (2015) | Peak position |
|---|---|
| Italy (FIMI) | 64 |
| Italy (airplay) | 17 |
| Italy (Italian airplay) | 7 |

== Certifications ==
| Region | Certification | Certified units/sales |
|---|---|---|
| Italy (FIMI) | Gold | 25,000^{‡} |
^{‡} Sales+streaming figures based on certification alone.

== Release history ==
| Region | Date | Format | Label |
|---|---|---|---|
| Italy | 10 July 2015 | Digital download | Sony Music Entertainment Italy |
