= Un giorno mi dirai =

Single by Stadio

from the album Miss nostalgia
- Released: 10 February 2016
- Recorded: 2015
- Genre: Pop rock
- Length: 4:04
- Label: Universal
- Songwriter(s): Gaetano Curreri; Saverio Grandi; Luca Chiaravalli
- Producer(s): Gaetano Curreri; Saverio Grandi

Stadio singles chronology
"Immagini del nostro amore" (2013)	"Un giorno mi dirai" (2016)

Music video
- "Un giorno mi dirai" on YouTube

"Un giorno mi dirai" (English: One day you will tell me) is a song recorded by the Italian band Stadio. Written by the band's frontman Gaetano Curreri along with Saverio Grandi and Luca Chiaravalli, the song was released as a single from their fifteenth studio album Miss nostalgia on 10 February 2016. The song enjoyed commercial success in Italy after winning the Sanremo Music Festival 2016, peaking at third place on the FIMI Singles Chart.

== Track listing ==
Digital download
No.	Title	Length
1.	"Un giorno mi dirai"	4:04

== Charts ==
Chart (2014)	Peak position
Italy (FIMI)	3

== Certifications ==
Region	Certification	Certified units/sales
Italy (FIMI)	Gold	25,000^{‡}
^{‡} Sales+streaming figures based on certification alone.
