= Sugarfree (Italian band) =

Italian pop-rock band formed in 2000

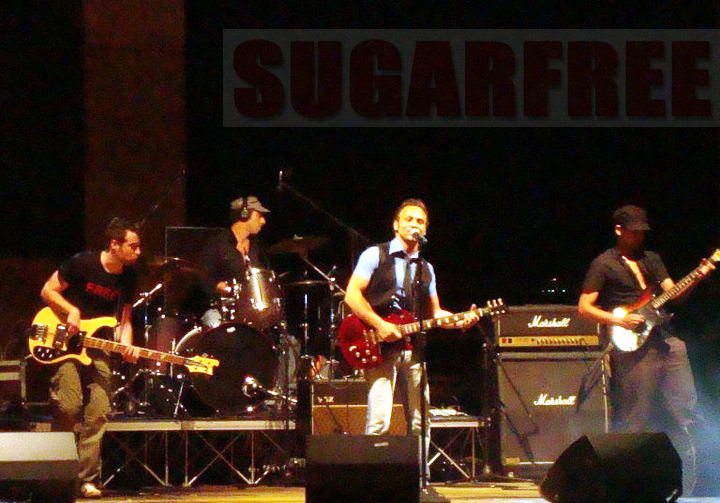

Background information
- Origin: Catania, Italy
- Genres: pop-rock
- Years active: 2000–present
- Labels: Atlantic Records; Warner Music Group; CGD; Buena Suerte

Sugarfree is an Italian pop-rock band formed in 2000, best known for the song "Cleptomania".

== Career ==
The group formed in Catania in 2000 as a cover band. After enjoying some local success, they started producing new songs, having a large success in 2005 with the single "Cleptomania", which peaked on the first place at the Italian hit parade, was certified platinum and sold over 40,000 copies.

In 2006 the group entered the main competition at the 56th edition of the Sanremo Music Festival, reaching the semifinals with the song "Solo lei mi dà". In 2008 the lead vocalist Matteo Amantia left the band to pursue a solo career; he rejoined the band in December 2014.

== Personnel ==
- Matteo Amantia Scuderi - vocals, guitars
- Carmelo Siracusa - bass guitars
- Giuseppe Lo Iacono - drums
- Giuseppe Nasello - guitars
- Massimo Caruso - keyboards

Former members

- Alfio Consoli - vocals, guitars
- Luca Galeano - guitars
- Vincenzo Pistone - keyboards
- Salvo Urzì - guitars

== Discography ==
Albums

- 2005 - Clepto-manie
- 2008 - Argento
- 2009 - In simbiosi (EP)
- 2011 - Famelico
