= Guardando il cielo =

Single by Arisa

from the album Guardando il cielo
- Language: Italian
- Released: 10 February 2016
- Genre: Folk-pop
- Length: 3:44
- Label: Warner Music Italy
- Songwriter: Giuseppe Anastasi
- Producers: Nicolò Fragile; Giuseppe Barbera

Arisa singles chronology
"Liberi" (2015)	"Guardando il cielo" (2016)	"Voce" (2016)

Music video
- "Guardando il cielo" on YouTube

"Guardando il cielo" (lit. 'Looking at the sky') is a song by Italian singer Arisa. It was written by Giuseppe Anastasi and produced by Nicolò Fragile and Giuseppe Barbera.

It was released by Warner Music Italy on 10 February 2016 as the lead single from her fifth studio album Guardando il cielo. The song was Arisa's entry for the Sanremo Music Festival 2016, where it placed tenth in the grand final.

== Music video ==
The music video of "Guardando il cielo" was directed by Gaetano Morbioli and released onto YouTube on 9 February 2016. The video was shot in London.

== Track listing ==
Digital download
No.	Title	Length
1.	"Guardando il cielo"	3:44

== Charts ==
Chart performance for "Guardando il cielo"
Chart (2016)	Peak position
Italy (FIMI)	19
Italy Airplay (EarOne)	28

== Certifications ==
Region	Certification	Certified units/sales
Italy (FIMI)	Gold	25,000^{‡}
^{‡} Sales+streaming figures based on certification alone.
