= Cieli immensi =

Single by Patty Pravo

from the album Eccomi
- Released: 10 February 2016
- Genre: Pop
- Length: 4:15
- Label: Warner Music Group
- Songwriter: Fortunato Zampaglione
- Producer: Michele Canova

Patty Pravo singles chronology
"Non mi interessa" (2013)	"Cieli immensi" (2016)	"Per difenderti da me" (2016)

Music video
- "Cieli immensi" on YouTube

"Cieli immensi" (Italian for "Immense Skies") is a song performed by Italian singer Patty Pravo, written by Fortunato Zampaglione. It was released as the first single from her 2016 album Eccomi.

The singer performed "Cieli immensi" at the 66th Sanremo Music Festival in February 2016 where it placed 6th and won the "Mia Martini" critics' award. The song was then made available digitally alongside its music video which attracted over 1 million YouTube views in 6 days and 3 million views in a month. The song was Patty's highest-charting single in Italy in over 10 years, reaching the top 20 on the back of its success at the festival.

== Track listing ==
- Streaming
1. "Cieli immensi" – 4:15

== Charts ==
Chart (2016)	Peak position
Italy (FIMI)	16
Italy (Musica e dischi)	4

== Certifications ==
Region	Certification	Certified units/sales
Italy (FIMI)	Gold	25,000^{‡}
^{‡} Sales+streaming figures based on certification alone.
