= Deborah Iurato =

Italian singer-songwriter (born 1991)

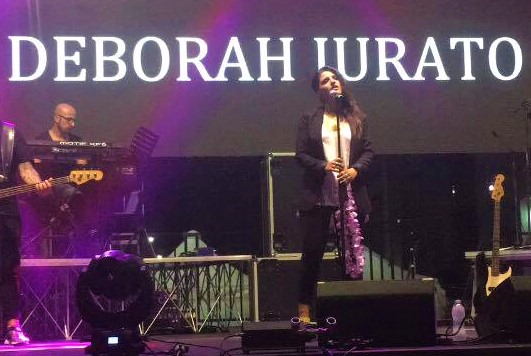
- Deborah Iurato during the Sono ancora io tour in August 2016

Background information
- Born: 21 November 1991 (age 34); Ragusa, Sicily, Italy
- Genres: Pop
- Occupation: Singer
- Years active: 2014–present
- Labels: Sony Music Italy (2014–2019); Sunyum Kim / Ora Label (2019–present)

Deborah Iurato (born 21 November 1991) is an Italian singer. She first came to prominence winning the thirteen season of the talent show Amici di Maria De Filippi in May 2014.

== Life and career ==
Deborah Iurato made her debut in 2014 in the talent show Amici di Maria De Filippi, winning the thirteenth edition. In the same period she made her debut with her first EP, also titled Deborah Iurato, which reached the second position in the Italian album charts, as well as being certified platinum by Fimi for over 50,000 copies sold. Releases two singles "Danzeremo a luci spente" and "Anche se fuori è inverno", written by Fiorella Mannoia. The latter reached the first position of the Italian Singles Chart and received the gold certification. During 2014 summer she released the song "Piccole cose" and opens the concerts of Fiorella Mannoia and Alessandra Amoroso.

On 17 October 2014 the singer released the single "L'amore vero", which anticipated her debut album Libere. It peaked at 11 position on the Italian Album Charts, and it was promoted by the singles " Dimmi dov'è il cielo " and the homonyms "Libere", about women's rights.

On 5 June 2015 the singer published the single "Da sola", written by Giovanni Caccamo, from her upcoming second studio album. In February 2016 Iurato made her debut at the Sanremo Music Festival with Giovanni Caccamo with the single "Via da qui", achieving the third position in the final ranking. The single was included in the second studio album Sono ancora io, released on 12 February 2016, which reached FIMI's 31st position. At the end of July 2016 the collaboration "Lasciami andare" with rapper Moreno was revealed for the rapper's album, Slogan. From 16 September to 4 November she was a contestant in the sixth edition of the television program Tale e quale show, triumphing in the final episode. On 3 December she was a guest in the semi-final of the 59th edition of the Zecchino d'Oro.

Between 2016 and 2019 she was subject to a break from the release of new singles and albums, but she continued her various tours around Italy singing covers and songs from previous albums. In 2018 she was chosen to sing the Italian theme song of the television series Heidi, bienvenida a casa. On 27 May 2019, the 5th anniversary of the victory of Amici di Maria De Filippi, she announced her collaboration with Italian band Soul System in the new single "Stammi bene (on my mind)" released on 7 June, the first excerpt from her new studio album to be released in 2020. With the group also undertakes a tour during 2019.

On April 24, 2020, Iurato published a new single "Supereroi", written by herself.

== Discography ==
=== Studio albums ===
Title	Album details	Peak chart positions
Title	Album details	ITA
Libere	Released: 10 November 2014; Label: Sony Music; Formats: CD, digital download, streaming	11
Sono ancora io	Released: 12 February 2016; Label: Sony Music; Formats: CD, digital download, streaming	31

=== Extended plays ===
Title	EP details	Peak chart positions	Certifications
Title	EP details	ITA	Certifications
Deborah Iurato	Released: 13 May 2014; Label: Sony Music; Formats: CD, digital download, streaming	2	FIMI: Platinum
Live Set - Groove Factory	Released: 7 June 2022; Label: Ora; Formats: CD, digital download, streaming	—	
"—" denotes EP that did not chart or were not released.

=== Singles ===
Title	Year	Peak positions	Certification	Album or EP
Title	Year	ITA	Certification	Album or EP
"Danzeremo a luci spente"	2014	23	FIMI: Gold	Deborah Iurato
"Anche se fuori è inverno"	2014	1	FIMI: Gold	Deborah Iurato
"Piccole cose"	2014	—		Deborah Iurato
"L'amore vero"	2014	—		Libere
"Dimmi dov'è il cielo"	2014	—		Libere
"Libere"	2015	—		Libere
"Da sola"	2015	—		Sono ancora io
"Via da qui" (with Giovanni Caccamo)	2016	35		Sono ancora io
"Stammi bene (On My Mind)" (featuring Soul System)	2019	—		Non-album singles
"Supereroi"	2020	—		Non-album singles
"Ma cosa vuoi?"	2020	—		Non-album singles
"Voglia di gridare"	2020	—		Non-album singles
"Out of Space"	2023	—		Non-album singles
"—" denotes singles that did not chart or were not released.

== Television programs ==
- Amici di Maria De Filippi 13 (Canale 5, 2014) – contestant – winner
- Sanremo Music Festival (Rai 1, 2016) – contestant
- Tale e quale show (Rai 1, 2016) – contestant – winner
- Zecchino d'Oro (Rai 1, 2016) – guest host
- Una voce per San Marino (San Marino RTV, 2023) – contestant
