= Jesse Paris Smith =

American musician and environmental activist

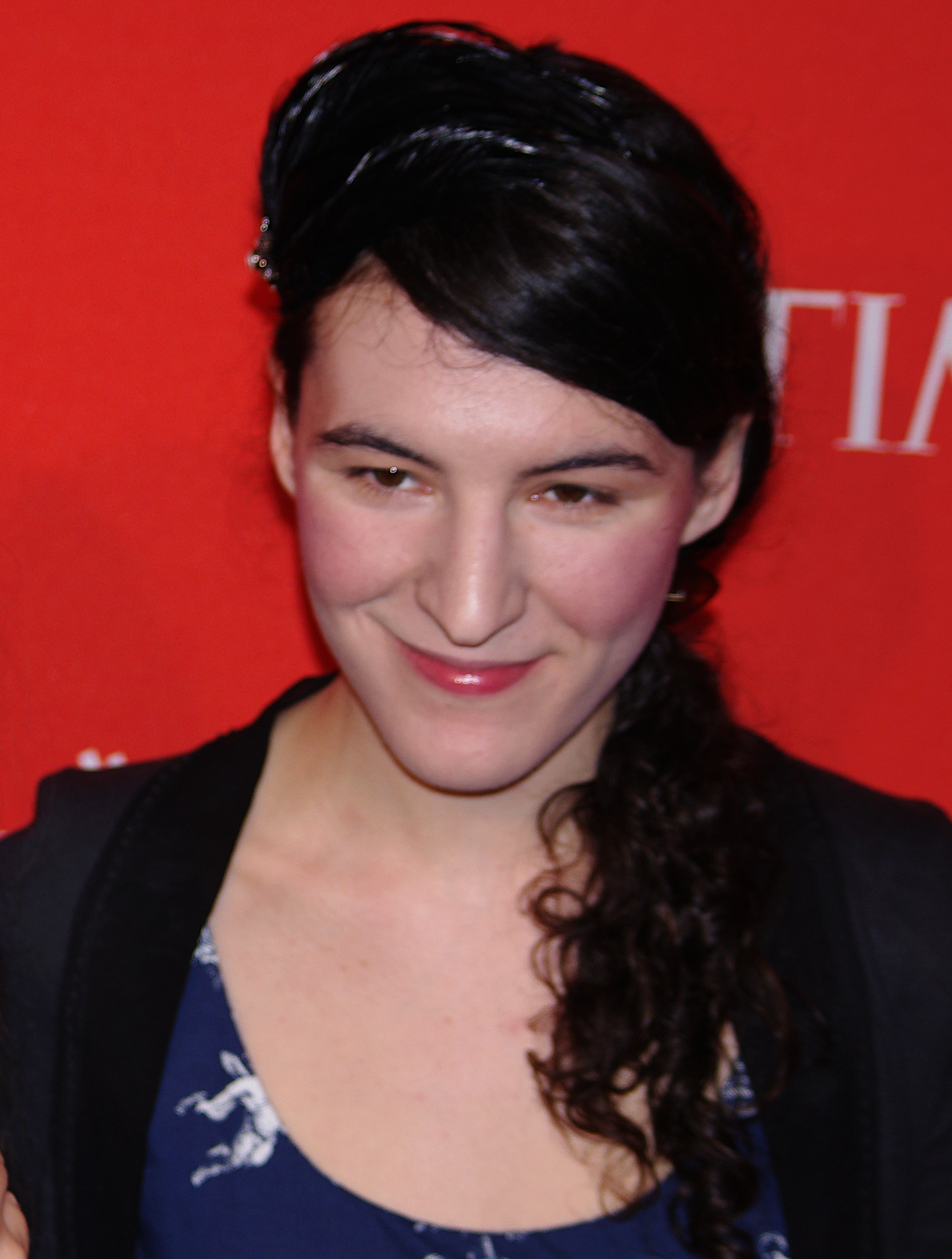
Paris Smith in 2011

Jesse Paris Smith is an American musician and environmental activist. She is the daughter of Fred "Sonic" Smith and Patti Smith.
