= Irene Fornaciari =

Italian singer-songwriter (born 1983)

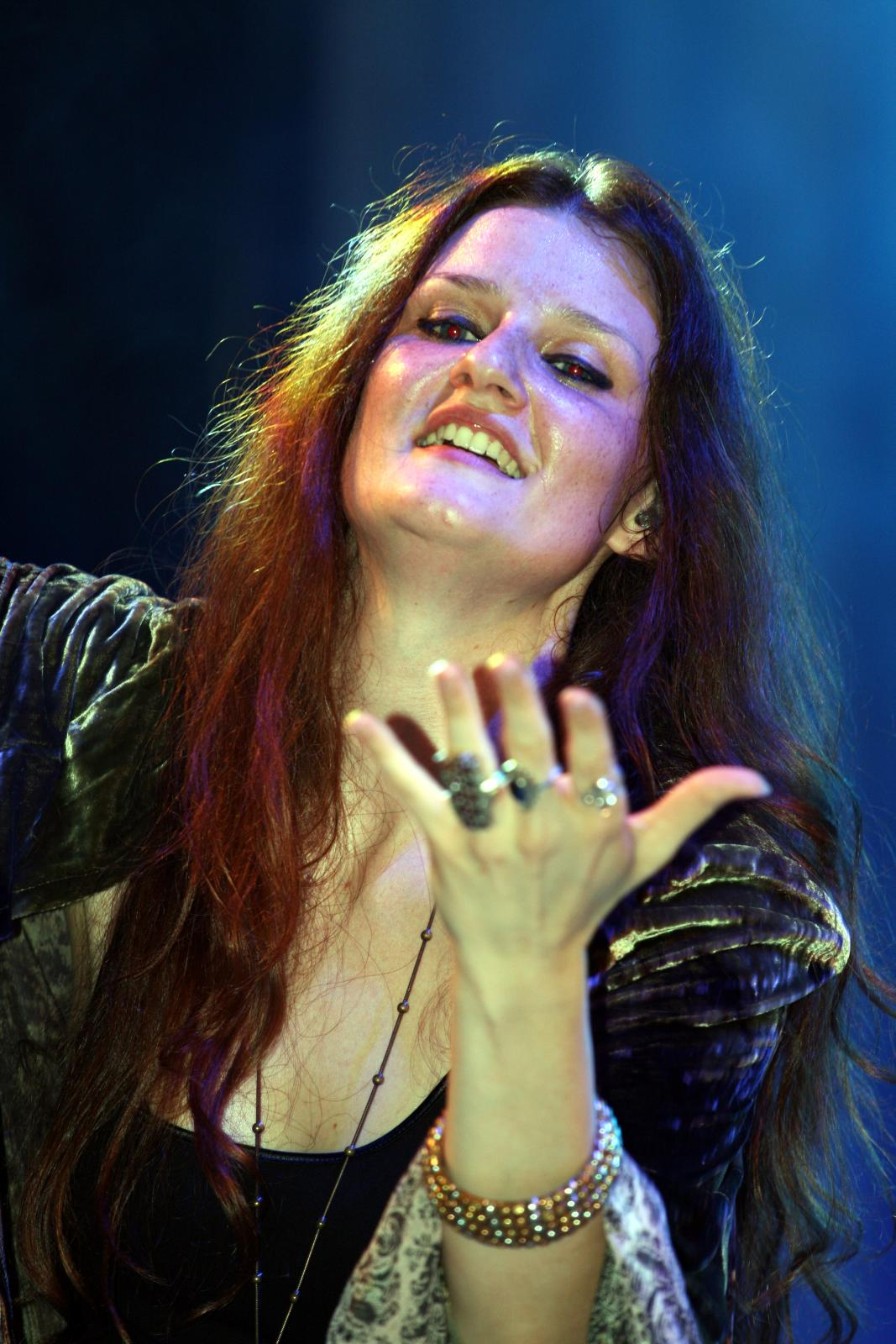
- Fornaciari in 2010

Background information
- Born: 24 December 1983 (age 42); Pietrasanta, Lucca, Italy
- Genres: Soul; blues
- Occupations: Singer; songwriter
- Instrument: Vocals
- Years active: 2008–present
- Labels: Universal; Polydor Records
- Website: www.irenefornaciari.it

Irene Fornaciari (born 24 December 1983) is an Italian singer-songwriter.

== Life ==
She was born in 1983. Her father is the singer Zucchero Fornaciari.

She participated in the Sanremo Music Festival 2009 in the "New Proposals" category but became famous with her 2010 participation, along with Nomadi, in the "Artists" category with the song "Il mondo piange". She has released three albums, eight singles and a collection.

On 18 January 2026, Irene Fornaciari performed live in Milano with her band Irene Fornaciari & Groove Aviators at Santeria Toscana 31, featuring a set blending soul, funk, rhythm & blues, and pop/rock classics as part of her ongoing live music activities.

== Discography ==
=== Album ===
- 2007 – Vertigini in fiore
- 2009 – Vintage Baby
- 2012 – Grande mistero

=== Collections ===
- 2010 – Irene Fornaciari

=== Singles and music videos ===
- 2006 – "Mastichi aria"
- 2006 – "Io non-abito più qua"
- 2007 – "Un sole dentro" (with video clips directed by Gaetano Morbioli)
- 2007 – "Un giro in giro"
- 2009 – "Spiove il sole" (with video clips directed by Gaetano Morbioli)
- 2010 – "Il mondo piange" (in collaboration with the Nomadi)
- 2010 – "Messin' with My Head" (in collaboration with Mousse T.; video clips directed by Marco Pavone)
- 2012 – "Grande mistero"
