= L'amore esiste =

2015 song recorded by Francesca Michielin

Single by Francesca Michielin

from the album di20
- Released: 6 March 2015
- Recorded: 2015
- Genre: Electropop
- Length: 3:32
- Label: Sony Music Italy
- Songwriters: Fortunato Zampaglione; Michele Canova
- Producer: Michele Canova

Francesca Michielin singles chronology
"Magnifico" (2014)	"L'amore esiste" (2015)	"Battito di ciglia" (2015)

Music video
- "L'amore esiste" on YouTube

"L'amore esiste" (English: Love exists) is a song recorded by Italian singer Francesca Michielin, written by Fortunato Zampaglione and Michele Canova. The latter also produced the track, which was released on 6 March 2015 as the lead single from Michielin's second studio album, di20. Certified double platinum by the Federation of the Italian Music Industry, it was Michielin's second solo top ten single in Italy. The song also received the Lunezia Pop Award in 2015.

== Background ==
In April 2014, Francesca Michielin revealed she was working on new material for her second studio album. Later during the same year, she appeared as a featured artist on the single "Magnifico" by Italian rapper Fedez, which became a commercial success in Italy, but she did not release any work as a lead artist until March 2015. In February 2015, Michielin started posting messages on her Twitter account, suggesting a new release. After sharing a photo of a red background, she sent a series of pictures with incremental details, including a prism and Michielin's name. The picture was later revealed as the single's artwork. During the same days, she also sent a message including the sentence "L'amore esiste" (English: Love exists), leading to speculations on it being the title of her new single or album. On 2 March, it was officially announced that "L'amore esiste" would be released on 6 March 2015 as the lead single from Michielin's second studio album, which was later titled di20.

== Composition and lyrical content ==
"L'amore esiste" was written and composed by Fortunato Zampaglione. Michele Canova, who produced the single, also contributed to the composition of the track's music. The song is an electropop ballad, in which Michielin lists a series of faint hints suggesting that love exists, concluding that the only thorough definition of love is "you", the man to which it is dedicated. However, Michielin revealed in an interview that the song also has a general meaning, claiming that "it is a hymn to love, which expresses itself both in its singularity and plurality". In the same interview, she stated the song represents "a sign of hope, an invitation to think about love as the only way to escape from the dark days we're living in".

== Reception ==
The song was a commercial success in Italy. It first entered the top 20 of the FIMI Singles Chart in April 2015, nearly a month after its release, and it peaked at number ten during the last week of the same month. Between April and June 2015, it spent ten weeks within the top 20. "L'amore esiste" was later certified double platinum by Federation of the Italian Music Industry, denoting combined sales and streams in excess of 100,000 equivalent units.

On 24 July 2015, Michielin received the "Lunezia Pop Award" for "L'amore esiste". The prize awards Italian songs in different genres for their "musical-literary value". Reviewing the track, Radio Italia's Paola Gallo considered "L'amore esiste" a very emotional song, praising Michielin's voice and the song's international sound. Writing for Italian music portal Rockol.it, Mattia Marzi also noted an "interesting work on arrangements and production", citing the use of vocoder as an element distinguishing the song from most Italian productions and comparing the track to Lorde's work. Il Fatto Quotidiano's Michele Monina strongly criticized the song, considering it a clone of Marco Mengoni's 2014 single "Guerriero", also co-written and produced by Zampaglione and Canova, and released by the same recording label.

== Track listing ==
Digital download
No.	Title	Length
1.	"L'amore esiste"	3:32

== Charts ==
=== Weekly charts ===
Chart performance for "L'amore esiste"
Chart (2015)	Peak position
Italy (FIMI)	10

=== Year-end charts ===
Chart performance for "L'amore esiste"
Chart (2015)	Position
Italy (FIMI)	41

== Certifications ==
Certifications for "L'amore esiste"
Region	Certification	Certified units/sales
Italy (FIMI)	2× Platinum	100,000^{‡}
^{‡} Sales+streaming figures based on certification alone.

== Amy Lee cover version ==
"Love Exists"

Single by Amy Lee
- Released: February 10, 2017
- Recorded: 2017
- Studio: Flex Studios
- Length: 4:35
- Songwriters: Fortunato Zampaglione; Michele Canova
- Producer: Guy Sigsworth

Amy Lee singles chronology
"Love Exists" (2017)	"Speak to Me" (2017)

In 2017, American singer Amy Lee recorded an English language cover version of the song, titled "Love Exists". Her cover was published online and released as a single on 10 February 2017. On the digital single, two different remixes of her song were featured as well as an instrumental version. Lee decided to rework the song while in Italy, working on the music video of her song "Speak to Me" recorded for the film Voice from the Stone (2017). The singer revealed that she had heard "L'amore esiste" on the radio, and afterwards "it seemed to follow me everywhere, got under my skin and just wouldn't leave". She elaborated, "I couldn’t stop listening to it, over and over the whole way home. I started piecing together what the lyrics meant and wrote my own twist on them in English." The singer afterwards presented her work to producer Guy Sigsworth whom she convinced to join her in New York and help her recreate "L'amore esiste". Dave Eggar was the one responsible for the string arrangement and the group recorded the song in a week at Flux Studios. Lee further elaborate on the work behind the song, saying,

"What an incredibly fulfilling experience it was to make this beautiful thing. And with such a talented, down-to-earth, and inspired team- with no rules or limitations beyond the ones we created. Guy pushed me in new ways and I learned a few things. It was a unique honor to work beside someone I admire so much on something that at the time had no plan, no album to go on, and made no sense other than how good it felt. It's easy to get bogged down by the 'point' sometimes, when what matters most in my opinion, in music-making, is following your heart. Finding a way to satisfy that deep need to express something that can't be said with words alone."

The ballad begins with a gentle synthesizer and a delicate melody which progressively adds more layers, including string arrangements. Lee's vocal performance in the song was described as "tranquil, subdued" during the verses and with "uplifting power and a soulful wail" during the chorus. Joe DiVita from the website Loudwire felt that overall, the song "resides on the more soothing side of things". Idolator writer Mike Wass praised "Love Exists", calling it "the best power ballad Celine Dion never sang — albeit with a pleasing twist of darkness". The song managed to appear at number four on the Belgian Ultratip chart in Wallonia on 18 March 2017.

=== Track listing ===
Digital download
No.	Title	Length
1.	"Love Exists"	3:31

Love Exists EP
No.	Title	Length
1.	"Love Exists"	3:31
2.	"Love Exists" (Guy Sigsworth Mix)	3:33
3.	"Love Exists" (Spaceway Remix)	3:59
4.	"Love Exists" (Instrumental)	3:31
