= Stadio =

Italian band

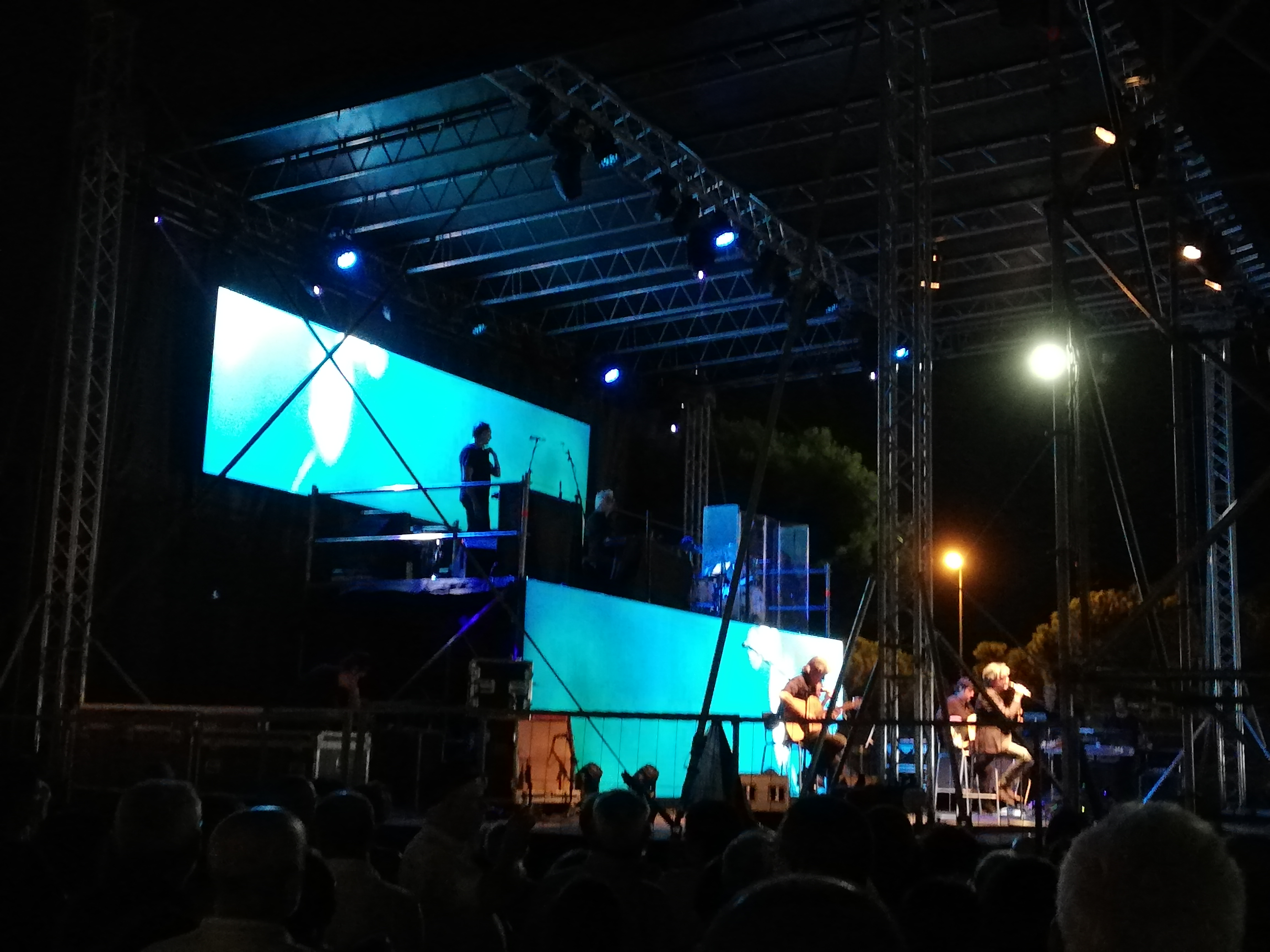

Background information
- Origin: Italy
- Genres: Pop rock; futurepop
- Years active: 1977–present
- Labels: RCA Italiana; EMI Italiana; BMG Ricordi; Universal
- Members: Giovanni Pezzoli (drums), Roberto Drovandi (bass guitar), Andrea Fornili (guitar), Gaetano Curreri (vocals and keyboard)
- Past members: Marco Nanni (bass guitar), Fabio Liberatori (keyboard), Ricky Portera (guitar), Aldo Fedele (keyboard), Roberto Costa (manager, bass guitar, keyboard), Beppe D'Onghia (keyboard), Massimo Sutera (bass guitar); Fabrizio Foschini (pianist)

Stadio (literally, Stadium) is an Italian pop rock band formed in 1977. The members are Giovanni Pezzoli (drums), Roberto Drovandi (bass guitar), Andrea Fornili (guitar), and Gaetano Curreri (vocals and keyboard).

== Formation and early recordings ==
The group had a long-standing arrangement as an accompanying band to Lucio Dalla, a Bologna-born singer. Stadio had its first notable public appearance in the mid-1970s, when the group appeared on Lucio Dalla's 1975 collaborative album with Roberto Roversi, Anidride Solforosa (Italian for "sulfur dioxide"). The members of Stadio on this album were Giovanni Pezzoli playing the drums, Marco Nanni playing the bass and Fabio Liberators playing the keyboard. The same musicians were featured on Dalla's 1977 album Com'è profondo il mare (How deep is the sea?).

The next Lucio Dalla single was released in February 1979 and a new Stadio member was introduced: guitarist Ricky Portera. This release, on the eve of the Banana Republic tour, saw Lucio Dalla and Francesco De Gregori (normally accompanied by Cyan) side-by-side. The line-up included the keyboard player and backing vocalist Gaetano Curreri, a future singer of the band. The official founding of the group came in the spring of 1981 during the summer tour by Lucio Dalla, when Stadio offered their first two songs, "Grande figlio di puttana" (major son of a bitch) and the energetic "Chi te l'ha detto" (Who told you that?), respectively on the B and A side of their first single, which came out at the end of that year. The two songs are included in the soundtrack of Carlo Verdone's film Borotalco, along with the song "Un fiore per Hal" (A flower for Hal), also published on the band's first LP, Stadio, which came out in the spring of 1982 for RCA Records, with the participation of Lucio Dalla, Ron and Jimmy Villotti as guests.

"Un fiore per Hal" is a long suite, sung by Ricky Portera with Lucio Dalla. It was repeated in the song "La mattina" (included on Q-disc Chiedi chi erano i Beatles – Ask who were the Beatles). They often appeared on backing vocals for Stadio, under the pseudonym of Domenico Sputi.

=== Development in the 1980s ===
1983 saw the release of the band's career-defining single, "Acqua e sapone" (water and soap), recorded for the eponymous film by Carlo Verdone. That same year, Stadio was accompanied by Ron, who also recorded the live album Tutti i cuori viaggianti (All traveling hearts) which resulted in the recruitment of rhythm guitarist Marco Bonino, and bassist Claudio Golinelli (a regular contributor to Vasco Rossi) in the place of Marco Nanni who played saxophone and percussion.

In 1984, they featured at the Festival di Sanremo with "Allo stadio" (at the stadium) as the final song. The song was included on the album La faccia delle donne (The face of women), which was released soon after the festival.

A few weeks before the festival, during the 1983 album tour, Pezzoli was badly injured in one eye while assembling his drum kit. Massimo Cappa, a young drummer, was asked to replace him. Cappa participated in the Festival and the subsequent television output of the band and toured with Lucio Dalla, who also appeared in the music video "Dentro le scarpe" (Inside the shoes). "Dentro le scarpe" became the theme song of the television program L'Orecchiocchio (The Ear-Eye).

In 1984, they contributed to the soundtrack of the Luciano Salce film Vediamoci chiaro, featuring the song "Ti senti sola" (You feel lonely) and Liberatori's original music. They also performed the song "Porno in TV" written for them by Lucio Dalla.

At the end of the same year, thanks to the opportunity offered by the Q-disc support, they released the mini-album Chiedi chi erano i Beatles (Ask who were the Beatles), which includes the title song, one of Stadio's biggest hits. Meanwhile, the band had reinstated Giovanni Pezzoli to play percussion after recovering from his eye injury. The other lyrics were written by Luca Carboni. The song "Vorrei" (I would) became part of the soundtrack of the Carlo Verdone film I due carabinieri (The two carabinieri), along with "Ba... ba... ballando" (Da... da... dancing) and "La mattina" (The morning), both appearing on the Q-disc. In the song "Vedovo Armando e signora" (Widowed Armando and Mrs), Lucio Dalla features as a backing vocalist. This mini-album was the last with the original lineup.

In December 1985, after several live television appearances with Lucio Dalla to present the album Bugie (Lies), Fabio Liberatori, tired of his life on the road, decided to leave the group to pursue a career as a music producer. He went on to work with Paola Turci, Ivan Graziani and Mario Castelnuovo, and especially with his friend, movie soundtrack composer Carlo Verdone. He was replaced in concerts by Neapolitan keyboardist Aldo Fedele. Liberatori later returned to work with the group on two albums in the 1990s: Di volpi, di vizi e di virtù (About foxes, about vices, about virtues) and Dammi 5 minuti (Give me 5 minutes).

In 1985 (and until 1990), the band added multi-instrumentalist Roberto Costa as a producer and member. Costa would arrange and perform nearly all the bass and keyboards instead of Liberatori and Nanni, who were increasingly relegated to participation in live shows. In the book dedicated to the band, Chiedi chi sono gli Stadio (Ask who are the Stadio) by Melisanda Massei Autunnali, Marco Nanni emphasizes precisely his discomfort in being virtually ousted from work by the band (in favor of Costa) despite being present in pictures and television appearances.

In February 1986, Stadio performed at the Festival di Sanremo, where their performance of "Canzoni alla radio" (Songs on the radio) ranked last in the competition, suffering from the absence of Liberatori who had left the band on the eve of the event. In the album of the same name that follows are included "Lunedì Cinema" (Monday Cinema), for some years the opening theme of the Lunedifilm movie showcase on Rai Uno; "Incubo assoluto" (Absolute nightmare) written for them by Roberto "Freak" Antoni; and generational "Giacche senza vento" (Coats without wind) with lyrics by director Ambrogio Lo Giudice. The same year Stadio took part in the American tour of Lucio Dalla, on which was recorded the live album DallAmeriCaruso, which included a performance of Stadio's own song "Grande figlio di puttana". Immediately after the tour, Ricky Portera left the group.

In 1987, keyboardist Beppe D'Onghia began working to replace Fedele (who took D'Onghia's position as keyboardist for Luca Carboni), and early next year Stadio released the collection Canzoni allo Stadio (Songs at Stadio style). It notably contains the songs "Bella più che mai" (Beautiful more than ever) with Saverio Grandi, a song destined to become a classic of the band, and rhythmic "Tu vuoi qualcosa" (You want something), presented at Festivalbar, and which would also be a theme song of soccer talk show Il Processo del Lunedì.

In 1988, Stadio participated in the Dalla/Morandi album and its tour. In addition to her repertoire, they played two unpublished songs that did not make it onto Canzoni allo Stadio.

In 1989, Stadio released their fourth album, Puoi fidarti di me (You can trust me), driven by the success of the single of the same name written by Luca Carboni.

=== The 1990s ===
In 1989 or 1990, Stadio dissolved their relationship as the tour band for Lucio Dalla, Curreri desiring Stadio to have more freedom to focus on and promote their own work. The last official collaboration was on an album by Robert & Cara (Robert Sidoli and Carolina Balboni, chorists of Dalla) for which Curreri and D'Onghia wrote the song "I segreti dell'amore" (The secrets of love). As the band began a new life without its long-time mentor, it faced many internal problems caused by the absolute instability of the private project of its main sponsor.

In early 1990, Marco Nanni, after a last TV appearance singing "Nel profondo del cuore" (In the deep of the heart), controversially left the group and joined Skiantos. He was replaced by Massimo Sutera.

In the late summer of 1990, after the long involvement of the band at Cantagiro, Beppe D'Onghia decided to return to work with Lucio Dalla. Shortly thereafter, Sutera also decided to join the Dalla team and was replaced by Roberto Drovandi (former bass guitarist of Luca Carboni). This left Gaetano Curreri and Giovanni Pezzoli as the only original members of Stadio. A few months later they added guitarist Andrea Fornili, who had worked for Loredana Bertè, Eros Ramazzotti and Miguel Bosé, and who had worked with Curreri on several TV commercials and the soundtrack for Stasera a casa di Alice (Tonight at Alice's) with the supervision of Vasco Rossi). Producer Luca Orioli, who played keyboards in the studio, took care of the arrangements and returns to his old friend Aldo Fedele as keyboard player in concerts with Alessandro Magri, also on keyboards and computer programming.

Pezzoli was tempted away by Dalla to take part in the Change tour, which Curreri accepted on the condition it would be temporary and not affect Stadio's studio work. From about the middle of the tour, Pezzoli abandoned work with Dalla to promote Stadio's new single. (Pezzoli would briefly reunite with Dalla to help record his 1996 studio album, Canzoni.)

In 1991, BMG released a second volume of Canzoni alla Stadio. It was viewed by the group as interference by their old record label, exploiting the upcoming release of their new album for EMI. The collection found little success, while the new album became Stadio's first gold record.

The single "Generazione di fenomeni" (Generation of phenomena) became the theme of RAI television show I ragazzi del muretto. It was released in advance of the album Siamo tutti elefanti inventati (We are all invented elephants), considered by critics as Stadio's most successful (along with La faccia delle donne), and which marked the beginning of the group's collaboration with Saverio Grandi. The album, conceived with actor Alessandro Bergonzoni, has several collaborations, including "Ci sarà (vita controvento)" (life upwind) written by Ivano Fossati, "Segreteria telefonica" (Voicemail) by Claudio Lolli, and "Pelle a pelle" (Skin to skin) by Luca Carboni and Bruno Mariani.

In 1992, Stabiliamo un contatto (Let's establish a contact) was released, including the songs: "Per la bandiera" (For the flag) written by Francesco Guccini in memory of the dead bodyguards of Giovanni Falcone and Paolo Borsellino; the Emilian artist signature, "Swatch"; "Libero di cambiare" (Free to change) with lyrics by Jovanotti; and "L'appostamento" and "Lo scatolone" (The big box) with lyrics by Bergonzoni.

StadioMobileLive is the first work on stage published in the fall of 1993 with the song "Un disperato bisogno d'amore" (A desperate need of love) (also published as a disco remix on "U Got 2 Let the Music" by Cappella). Di volpi, di vizi e di virtù, published in 1995 includes among others the work of Roberto Vecchioni for "Canzone d'amore sprecato" (Wasted love song), Edoardo Bennato playing harmonica, Roberto Roversi's songs "Maledettamericatiamo" and "Ma se guido una Ferrari" (But if I drive a Ferrari), and one of their biggest hits, "Ballando al buio". In the spring of 1997 they released Dammi 5 minuti, which included "Un volo d'amore" (A love flying), the story of two young lovers killed in the Bosnian conflict.

In 1998, Stadio released Ballate fra il cielo e il mare (Ballads between the sky and the sea), a thematic collection that included new versions of their love songs. The disc was reissued in February 1999 with the addition of the song "Lo zaino" (The backpack), written by Vasco Rossi. In the 2000 album Donne & colori (Women and colours), Stadio attempted, with the production help of Guido Elmi and Frank Nemola, an ethnic approach, resulting in the song "In paradiso con te" (In paradise with you) with Israeli singer Amal Murkus. The album also features two songs with lyrics by Roberto Roversi. The album met a lukewarm reception and is one of the less successful in their careers.

=== The 2000s ===
==== Occhi negli occhi ====
After reflecting on their previous album and ballad collection, Stadio refocused and released the 2002 album Occhi negli occhi (Eyes in eyes) with the singles "Sorprendimi" (Surprise) and "Il segreto" (The secret).

In 2003, during a stop on the tour in Acireale, Curreri suffered a stroke, and was saved by a physician in the audience.

The same year, after years of controversy, in a televised broadcast, Stadio performed a duet with Lucio Dalla, "Grande figlio di puttana". In the same period there was also a collaboration between Curreri and Portera (former Stadio guitarist and front-man). These two, along with Pezzoli and Roberto Costa on bass, recorded Portera's second album, Ci sono cose. This collaboration also led to a new arrangement of Stadio's "Canzoni alla radio".

==== L'amore volubile and Canzoni per parrucchiere ====
With the release in 2005 of their album L'amore volubile (The fickle love), Stadio seemed to change trajectory with writer and producer Figure Saverio Grandi. In 2006, they released Canzoni per parrucchiere Live Tour (Songs for hairdressers Live Tour) as an album and their first concert DVD, recorded during a stop of the theatrical tour.

==== Parole nel vento ====
In 2007, Gaetano Curreri and Saverio Grandi, together with Marco Falagiani and Giancarlo Bigazzi, wrote "E mi alzo sui pedali" (And I get up on the pedals) for the RAI production Marco Pantani, also filming a video clip. The song is also included on the album Parole nel vento (Words in the wind) released after their participation at Sanremo with the song "Look at me" (thirteenth place). The album was followed by a tour of theaters, sports arenas, and squares. In 2007, they won the award for best Italian group at the Venice Music Awards. On 9 November 2007 the triple-disc Platinum Collection of Stadio's greatest hits was released and a new tour launched on 17 November 2007.

==== Diluvio universale and Diamanti e caramelle ====
On 20 March 2009, Stadio released the album Diluvio universale with a title song written with Vasco Rossi and Alessandro Magri, and arranged by Alessandro Magri. The album also includes "Resta come sei" (Stay as you are), composed and sung by Fabrizio Moro. On March 23 they began the Diluvio tour in Bologna; in some stages there was the participation of Noemi and Fabrizio Moro. On 6 March 2009, they released the single "Gioia e dolore" (Joy and sorrow).

On 26 August 2011, they released "Gaetano e Giacinto", a song dedicated to Gaetano Scirea and Giacinto Facchetti, and single of the album Diamanti e caramelle (Diamonds and candy), which was in stores 27 September 2011. The album includes "La promessa" (The promise) as a duet with Noemi. On 3 February 2012, a third single was released, "Poi ti lascerò dormire" (Then let you sleep), which was used in the soundtrack for Carlo Verdone's Posti in piedi in paradiso (Places standing in heaven).

==== 30 I nostri anni and Immagini del vostro amore ====
On 30 October 2012, Stadio released their third live album, 30 I nostri anni (Our 30 years), to celebrate the group's thirty-year career. The anthology included three unpublished songs: "I nostri anni" (Our years) written by Fabrizio Moro, "Bella" by Luca Carboni, and "Dall'altra parte dell'età" (across age) by Poplars and Fornili. (The first two were singles for the album.) Additional songs are performed with the Sanremo Festival Orchestra, under the direction of Maestro Bruno Santori.

On 24 October 2013, Stadio released the single "Immagini del nostro amore" (Pictures of our love) and on 19 November the album Immagini del vostro amore (Pictures of your love). It includes duets with Noemi in "La promessa", with Saverio Grandi in "Cortili lontani" (In courtyards away) and a collaboration with Solis String Quartet in "La mia canzone per te" (In my song for you).

=== The return: winning Sanremo Music Festival 2016 ===
On 13 December 2015, the group's participation in the 66th Sanremo Music Festival was announced, in the Campioni (big artists) section, with the song "Un giorno mi dirai" (One day you will tell me), to promote Stadio's album Miss Nostalgia, released 12 February 2016.

On 13 February 2016, Stadio won the Campioni section, and also the right to represent Italy at the Eurovision Song Contest 2016. However, Italian broadcaster RAI confirmed after the competition that Stadio decided not to participate in the Eurovision Song Contest. The artist who represented Italy was the runner-up, Francesca Michielin.

Stadio also won the Sanremo Music Festival award for Best Cover, with the song "La Sera Dei Miracoli" by Lucio Dalla. They won the Festival with a standing ovation from the Ariston Theatre.

== Discography ==
=== Album Studio ===
- 1982 – Stadio
- 1984 – La faccia delle donne
- 1986 – Canzoni alla radio
- 1989 – Puoi fidarti di me
- 1991 – Siamo tutti elefanti inventati
- 1992 – Stabiliamo un contatto
- 1995 – Di volpi, di vizi e di virtù
- 1997 – Dammi 5 minuti
- 2000 – Donne & colori
- 2002 – Occhi negli occhi
- 2005 – L'amore volubile
- 2007 – Parole nel vento
- 2009 – Diluvio universale
- 2011 – Diamanti e caramelle
- 2016 – Miss nostalgia

=== Album live ===
- 1993 – Stadiomobile Live
- 2006 – Canzoni per parrucchiere Live Tour
- 2012 – 30 I nostri anni

=== Collections ===
- 1988 – Canzoni alla Stadio
- 1991 – Canzoni alla Stadio 2
- 1994 – Acqua e sapone
- 1996 – Il canto delle pellicole
- 1998 – Ballate fra il cielo e il mare
- 2000 – I miti musica
- 2003 – Storie e geografie
- 2007 – The Platinum Collection
- 2011 – I più grandi successi
- 2012 – Un'ora con Stadio
- 2013 – Immagini del vostro amore

Awards and achievements
Preceded by Il Volo	Sanremo Music Festival winner 2016	Succeeded by Francesco Gabbani
