= Fortunato Zampaglione =

- Born: 24 February 1975 (age 51); Monza, Italy
- Genres: pop, rock and soul
- Occupations: Musician; singer-songwriter

Fortunato Zampaglione (born 24 February 1975) is an Italian singer-songwriter, producer of music records, lyricist and composer.

== Biography ==
=== The beginnings ===
His first appearance in the music world took place in 2000, presenting "Gioia", his first single, at The Festivalbar of that year (presented by Fiorello and Alessia Marcuzzi).

The single had a B-side titled "Easy Rider".

In the summer of 2001, Mercury Records of Universal Music Italia released "On a Summer Day".

In November 2001, Mercury Records released the album "1975" before the single "Ti Cancellerò" in which Fortunato Zampaglione helped create its video.

The album "1975" was recorded at Jungle Sound in Milan which clearly demonstrates his versatile character as a songwriter through introspective ballads ("Quando Io Penso a Lei", "Ti Cancellerò", "Piove" just as in the Britpop song ("Se Fossi Veramente Tu").

In 2002 the lack of promotional opportunities forced him to participate in the television show "Destinazione Sanremo", presented by Claudio Cecchetto and Elisabetta Gregoraci.

=== The careers of songwriters ===
In 2002,

- Zampaglione took part in the National Italian Singer Football Team, captained by Gianni Morandi. He played at "La Partita Del Cuore" of the same year and he took part in many other promotional fundraising events.
- He put his singer-songwriter career on hold to pursue his career as an author, writing for Universal Music Italia Publishing.

Zampaglione's first publication in his new career is "L'allenatore" a track on the album "A Chi si Ama Veramente" sung by Gianni Morandi, the face of the famous TV show on "RAI 2" titled "Quelli Che il Calcio".

He wrote "Solo Lei Mi Da" in 2006 which was sung by Sugarfree at the 2006 Sanremo.

In 2007 he wrote and collaborated with others, some of which who were among the greatest Italian international interpreters, in the Italian adaptation of several songs.

In 2008 as a songwriter and music producer he was the face of the television program 'Ultrasound' which was produced and aired by MTV Italia.

In 2010, he wrote the romantic ballad "Meravigliosa" for Emma Marrone which subsequently lead to her winning the finals and becoming the winner of the television show 'Amici’.

In 2011, he wrote:

- "Costellazioni" for Antonino Spadaccino and produced by Mara Maionchi.
- "Lei Mi Amò" for Sugarfree.

Between 2012 and 2013 he traveled frequently between his London home and his Milan home to compose "Ultime Gocce d’estate" for Paola and Chiara and "Non c’è Me Senza di Te" for Syria's single "Odiare".

He began collaborating with Sony Music Italia and Michele Canova in 2014, resulting in many successful tracks.

- "Il Mio Giorno Più Bello del Mondo" sung by Francesco Renga. A successful single from the album "Tempo Reale"- a double platinum album. It was also chosen as the artistic installation track for the 'Albero Della Vita' attraction at the 2015 Expo in Milan.
- "Guerriero" sung by Marco Mengoni launched from the album "Parole in Circolo"- received five platinum albums and more than 250,000 copies were sold.
- "Ed è per Questo" from the same album by Marco Mengoni, "Parole in Circolo".
- "Amarti è folle" sung by Belen Rodriguez, soundtrack from the film "Non c'è Due Senza Te", starring Belen Rodriguez, Fabio Troiano, Dino Abbrescia and Tosca D'acquino. The track was written and produced entirely by Fortunato Zampaglione with the collaboration of the sound engineer Beppe Salvadori, mixed by Michael Brauer and released by Warner Music Italia.
- "L'amore esiste" sung by Francesca Michielin, the launching single from the album "Di20"- received a double platinum record which reached seventh place in the Italian Air Play category, platinum record- recognizing Lunezia for the most pop lyrics.
- "Battito di ciglia" sung by Francesca Michielin, was the second single released from the album "Di20" and a 2015 Summer hit.
- "Lontano" sung by Francesca Michielin, was the third single released from the album "Di20"and a 2015 Autumn hit.
- "Riderai" written and produced by Zampaglione, sung by Bianca Atzei, topped the Italian Airplay Classification.
- "Ti Ho Voluto Bene Veramente" sung by Marco Mengoni, a single from the album "Le Cose Che Non Ho" was released on 4 December 2015.
- "Volevo te" (November 2015) sung by Giusy Ferreri, a single from her Greatest Hits album, released in December 2015, which scaled up the charts to first place.
- "Cieli immensi" (February 2016) performed by Patty Pravo at the Sanremo Festival. The only song to have received a standing ovation.
- "Il ricordo Che Lascio" sung by Zero Assoluto, a single from the album "Di me e di te".
- "Spiccare il volo – Perfetto – Migliore – Così diversa" (April 2016) sung by Francesco Renga, tracks from the album "Scriverò il tuo Nome".
- "Follow the Summer" (single released in July 2016) producer and DJ under pseudonym Paco Wurz in collaboration with Beppe Salvatori and Pat Simonini, sung by Chiara.
- "Sai Che" sung by Marco Mengoni, was the single which launched the album "Marco Mengoni Live" released in October 2016.
- "Migliore" sung by Francesco Renga, released as the single from the album "Scriverò il tuo nome" in November 2016.
- "Love Exists" (10 February 2017) sung by American Amy Lee, the voice of Evanescence, cover of "L'amore esiste" published in Italy, 2015 by Francesca Michielin.
- *In February 2017, he signed an exclusive authorial agreement with SugarMusic spa. Furthermore, Fortunato Zampaglione signs as exclusive producer with SugarMusic spa in the hope to give Italian music a new course and sound.
- May 2017, he wrote and produced "Abbracciami perdonami gli sbagli", sung by Bianca Atzei, an electro-dance song produced at Kanepa Studios by Paco Wurz and Pat Simonini and mastered by Luca Pretolesi.
- October 2017, he wrote "Amore Gigante" title track of the new Gianna Nannini's album.
- November 2017, "In the name of love" sung by Lorenzo Licitra, competitor of X Factor Italy series 11.
- December 2017, he wrote with the Carnaby band a song titled "Christmas Girl" and debuts as a director of the music video.
- on 14 December 2017 Lorenzo Licitra wins X Factor Italy series 11, singing "in the name of love" written by Fortunato.
- January 2018, wrote "Fire on ice" sung by Bianca Atzei, theme song World Figure Skating Championships in Milan
- March 2018, wrote "Amore Gigante" sung by Gianna Nannini (title track).
- October 2018, wrote "Fall on me" sung by Andrea Bocelli and his son Matteo, (end credits song from the upcoming Disney movie The Nutcracker and The Four Realms).
- November 2018 wrote "Like the rain" (unpredictable), sung by Naomi, competitor of X Factor (Italy series 12).
- November 2018 wrote "nati per amare", track of the new Eros Ramazzotti's album "Vita ce n'è".
- April 2019 wrote "bacon" and "dentro ogni sbaglio commesso", sung by Francesco Renga and included in the LP "l'altra metà".

== Adaptations ==
- *Italian adaptation of the song "All Over Again" performed by the international artist Ronan Keating.
- *Italian adaptation of the song "Everything I Do I Do For You" by Bryan Adams sung by Katherine Jenkins;
- *Italian adaptation of the song "Mas" by Nelly Furtado also performed by Nelly Furtado;
- *Italian adaptation of the song "La Loi du Silence" by Johnny Hallyday;
- *Italian adaptation of Caro Emerald featuring Giuliano Palma "Riviera Life"
