= Tutto Max =

Greatest hits album by Max Pezzali & 883
- Released: 10 June 2005
- Language: Italian
- Label: Warner
- Producers: Pier Paolo Peroni; Marco Guarnerio; Claudio Cecchetto

Max Pezzali chronology
Il mondo insieme a te (2004)	Tutto Max (2005)	Time Out (2007)

883 chronology
Love/Life (2002)	Tutto Max (2005)	Hanno ucciso l'Uomo Ragno 2012 (2012)

Tutto Max (transl. All Max) is a greatest hits album by Italian singer-songwriter Max Pezzali, released on 10 June 2005 by Warner. The compilation primarily features songs recorded by 883 between 1991 and 2002, alongside four tracks from Pezzali's debut solo studio album, Il mondo insieme a te (2004). For this reason, 883 are credited on the album as a secondary artist.

It was a commercial success in Italy, reaching number one on the Albums chart and spending ten consecutive weeks at the top. It was the ninth best-selling album in Italy in 2005.

== Track listing ==
CD 1
No.	Title	Length
1.	"Eccoti" (New 2005)	4:08
2.	"Nord sud ovest est"	4:30
3.	"Hanno ucciso l'Uomo Ragno"	4:12
4.	"Lo strano percorso"	4:10
5.	"Come mai"	4:15
6.	"Sei un mito"	5:06
7.	"Bella vera"	3:34
8.	"Come deve andare"	4:35
9.	"La regola dell'amico"	4:03
10.	"Gli anni ('96)"	4:34
11.	"Rotta per casa di Dio"	4:52
12.	"Nessun rimpianto"	4:23
13.	"Se tornerai"	3:39
14.	"Un giorno così"	4:22
15.	"Senza averti qui"	3:47
16.	"Io ci sarò"	4:38
17.	"Il mondo insieme a te"	4:03
18.	"Uno in più"	4:41

CD 2
No.	Title	Length
1.	"Grazie mille" (Benvenuto 2000 remix)	3:56
2.	"Ci sono anch'io"	3:43
3.	"La regina del Celebrità"	3:53
4.	"Una canzone d'amore"	5:32
5.	"Ti sento vivere"	3:56
6.	"La dura legge del gol"	5:02
7.	"Con un deca"	4:57
8.	"Non me la menare"	4:14
9.	"Nella notte"	4:22
10.	"Nient'altro che noi"	4:33
11.	"Tieni il tempo"	3:35
12.	"S'inkazza (Questa casa non è un albergo)"	3:34
13.	"Fai come ti pare" (Radio edit)	3:21
14.	"Quello che capita"	4:51
15.	"Me la caverò"	3:41
16.	"Viaggio al centro del mondo" (Jeo's remix)	3:50
17.	"Jolly Blue"	3:30
18.	"La lunga estate caldissima"	3:44

== Charts ==
=== Weekly charts ===
Weekly chart performance for Tutto Max
Chart (2005)	Peak position
Italian Albums (FIMI)	1
Swiss Albums (Schweizer Hitparade)	63

=== Year-end charts ===
Year-end chart performance for Tutto Max
Chart (2005)	Position
Italian Albums (FIMI)	9

== Certifications ==
Certifications for Tutto Max
Region	Certification	Certified units/sales
Italy (FIMI)	3× Platinum	150,000^{‡}
^{‡} Sales+streaming figures based on certification alone.
