= Accidentally Famous =

2024 Italian television series

- Genre: Comedy
- Created by: Francesco Agostini; Chiara Laudani; Giorgio Nerone; Sydney Sibilia
- Written by: Sydney Sibilia; Chiara Laudani; Francesco Agostini; Giorgio Nerone; Marco Pettenello
- Directed by: Sydney Sibillia; Alice Filippi; Francesco Ebbasta; Alessio Lauria; Simone Godano
- Starring: Elia Nuzzolo; Matteo Oscar Giuggioli; Ludovica Barbarito; Davide Calgaro; Alberto Astorri; Roberta Rovelli; Edoardo Ferrario; Roberto Zibetti; Angelo Spagnoletti; Gaia Zampighi; Alessio Praticò; Marianne Painelli
- Opening theme: "Con un deca" by 883
- Country of origin: Italy
- Original language: Italian
- No. of series: 2
- No. of episodes: 16

Production
- Executive producers: Paolo Lucarini; Nils Hartmann
- Producers: Matteo Rovere; Sydney Sibilia
- Cinematography: Valerio Azzali; Davide Manca

Original release
- Network: Sky Serie
- Release: 11 October 2024 – 20 November 2026

Accidentally Famous is an Italian comedy television series produced by Matteo Rovere and Sydney Sibilia, based on the true story of pop duo 883. The series premiered on Sky Serie and began streaming on Now on 11 October 2024. Its two seasons, titled Hanno ucciso l'Uomo Ragno and Nord sud ovest est, respectively, follow the making of the two 883 albums.

== Plot ==
Italy, late 1980s. Max Pezzali and Mauro Repetto are two teenagers from Pavia who bond over their shared passion for music. After meeting in high school, the two begin writing songs together, combining Pezzali's songwriting with Repetto's enthusiasm for music and forming the pop duo 883. Their collaboration leads them to music producer Claudio Cecchetto, who helps them launch their professional career. As 883 gains popularity, Pezzali and Repetto navigate the challenges of the music industry, romantic relationships and the changes brought about by their growing success.

== Cast ==
=== Main ===
- Elia Nuzzolo as Max Pezzali (season 1–2)
- Matteo Oscar Giuggioli as Mauro Repetto (season 1–2)
- Ludovica Barbarito as Silvia "Atene" Panagiōtopoulos (season 1–2)
- Davide Calgaro as Cisco (season 1–2)
- Alberto Astorri as Sergio Pezzali (season 1–2)
- Roberta Rovelli as Alba Scanavini Pezzali (season 1–2)
- Edoardo Ferrario as Pier Paolo Peroni (season 1–2)
- Roberto Zibetti as Claudio Cecchetto (season 1–2)
- Angelo Spagnoletti as Raffaele "Lello" Cantarelli (season 1–2)
- Gaia Zampighi as Michela Rossini (season 2)
- Alessio Praticò as Carlo Lucarelli (season 2)
- Marianne Painelli as Brandi (season 2)

=== Recurring ===
- Francesco Cauzzi as Alessandro (season 1–2)
- Riccardo Armiento as Nemorino (season 1–2)
- Alexia Cozzi as Marisa (season 1–2)
- Roberta Sferzi as Prof. Coppone (season 1–2)
- Giulia Lotta as Cinzia (season 1–2)
- Giorgia Cardaci as Mauro's mother (season 1–2)
- Stefano Scherini as Mauro's father (season 1–2)
- Vasco Mirandola as Bonelli (season 1–2)
- Mauro Serio as Gianni (season 1–2)
- Filippo Giacomelli as Baldo (season 1–2)
- Massimiliano Rossi as Piero (season 1–2)
- Camilla Pistorello as Alessandra (season 1–2)
- Carlo Palmeri as Rosario Fiorello (season 1–2)
- Livio Remuzzi as Albertino (season 1)
- Igor Chierici as Fargetta (season 1)
- Antonio Russo as the Bar Dante patron (season 2)
- Maurizio Merluzzo as Giuseppe "Maxibon" Santini (season 2)

=== Guest ===
- Lorenzo McGovern Zaini as Albert Einstein (season 1)
- Robin Mugnaini as Hermann Einstein (season 1)
- Carolina D'Alatri as Maria De Filippi (season 1)
- Pablo Sandstrom as David Gozzard (season 1)
- Leonardo Cappelli as Jovanotti (season 1)
- Giulia Sangiorgi as Laura (season 1)
- Luca Chikovani as Sandy Marton (season 1)
- Leonardo Della Bianca as Alessandro Canino (season 1)
- Ruben Aprea as Johnson Righeira (season 2)
- Matteo Maiolani as Michael Righeira (season 2)
- Costantino Seghi as Freak Antoni (season 2)
- Alessia Maris as Bianca (season 2)
- Alessandro Bay Rossi as Carmelo La Bionda (season 2)
- Davide Strava as Michelangelo La Bionda (season 2)
- Rosa Barbolini as Caterina Rappoccio (season 2)
- Antonio De Matteo as Fabrizio Ferri (season 2)
- Nicole Bellucci as Ambra Angiolini (season 2)
- Federico Marignetti as Stefano Salvati (season 2)
- Jacopo Ercoli as Ugo Foscolo (season 2)
- Robert Madison as Frank Trucillo (season 2)

== Episodes ==
Series	Season title	Episodes	Originally released	
Series	Season title	Episodes	First released	Last released
1	Hanno ucciso l'Uomo Ragno	8	11 October 2024	1 November 2024
2	Nord sud ovest est	8	9 October 2026	20 November 2026

=== Hanno ucciso l'Uomo Ragno (2024) ===
No. overall	No. in season	Title	Directed by	Written by	Original release date
1	1	"Episode 1"	Sydney Sibilia	Francesco Agostini, Chiara Laudani and Sydney Sibilia	11 October 2024
In the summer of 1989, Massimo Pezzali is held back at school and forced to work in his parents' flower shop in Pavia. After meeting Silvia, he pretends to be a singer and promises to write a song for her. With the help of a videotape introducing him to electronic sampling, he finally completes the song. On his first day at a new school, he meets Mauro Repetto, a music enthusiast who becomes his classmate.
2	2	"Episode 2"	Sydney Sibilia	Francesco Agostini, Chiara Laudani, Giorgio Nerone and Sydney Sibilia	11 October 2024
Mauro, frustrated by his lack of recognition, persuades Max to help him deliver a mixtape to American DJ David Gozzard. After hearing Max's song for Silvia, Gozzard recognises the pair's potential and encourages them to make music together. Mauro exchanges his DJ equipment for a sequencer, and the two begin composing songs.
3	3	"Episode 3"	Alice Filippi	Francesco Agostini, Giorgio Nerone and Sydney Sibilia	18 October 2024
While preparing for their high-school graduation, Max and Mauro are selected to perform on the television programme hosted by Jovanotti after Mauro sends their song "Living in the Music" to Radio DeeJay. They attract the attention of producer Claudio Cecchetto, who names them I Pop. Despite their successful television appearance, tensions arise between the friends, who disagree about their future and the direction of their music.
4	4	"Episode 4"	Alice Filippi	Francesco Agostini and Giorgio Nerone	18 October 2024
Following their argument, Max and Mauro pursue separate paths. The two eventually reconcile, and, inspired by Max's experiences with Silvia, they write "Non me la menare". They also choose the name 883 for their musical duo, marking the beginning of their professional partnership.
5	5	"Episode 5"	Francesco Ebbasta	Francesco Agostini, Chiara Laudani and Sydney Sibilia	25 October 2024
Cecchetto invites the 883 to Milan to record their debut album. The duo move into accommodation shared with other artists, including Fiorello and Sandy Marton, but struggle to produce enough songs. Encouraged to draw inspiration from their everyday lives, Max and Mauro begin writing new material. However, producer Pier Paolo Peroni remains unconvinced that they have enough material to complete the album.
6	6	"Episode 6"	Alice Filippi	Francesco Agostini and Sydney Sibilia	25 October 2024
Back in Pavia, Max and Mauro face uncertainty about their future and fear becoming failures in their hometown. Encouraged by their friend Cisco, they resume writing songs, including "Con un deca". An encounter with Lello, a disillusioned man reflecting on his unfulfilled ambitions, inspires Max to write "Hanno ucciso l'Uomo Ragno". The duo record the song with Pier Paolo and present it to Cecchetto, hoping it will secure their breakthrough.
7	7	"Episode 7"	Francesco Ebbasta	Francesco Agostini and Sydney Sibilia	1 November 2024
The album Hanno ucciso l'Uomo Ragno becomes a major commercial success, but the 883 initially struggle to gain recognition and establish themselves as performers. During their first concerts at Cantagiro, Mauro feels sidelined because he mainly sings backing vocals and has no clearly defined role onstage. After Cecchetto criticises their stage presence, Mauro embraces a more energetic performance style, helping the duo win over audiences and achieve widespread popularity.
8	8	"Episode 8"	Francesco Ebbasta	Francesco Agostini and Sydney Sibilia	1 November 2024
As the 883's popularity grows, Max and Mauro travel to Riccione for a major summer event. Max struggles to balance his musical ambitions with his relationship with Silvia, who plans to move to Dublin, while Mauro remains dissatisfied with being regarded primarily as the group's dancer. Their performance in Riccione strengthens the duo's success, but Max and Silvia eventually part ways. Back in Pavia, Max revisits the old song written for her, which becomes the starting point for "Come mai".

=== Nord sud ovest est (2026) ===
No. overall	No. in season	Title	Directed by	Written by	Original release date
9	1	"Episode 1"	Sydney Sibilia	Francesco Agostini and Sydney Sibilia	9 October 2026
Max breaks the fourth wall to recount the story of the Righeira, whose friendship and musical career mirror his relationship with Mauro. After achieving European success, Johnson and Michael fall out over their musical direction, eventually winning the Festivalbar in 1985 with "L'estate sta finendo". Their story convinces Max to prioritise his friendship with Mauro and discard "Come mai", as its slow tempo would prevent Mauro from dancing and risk overshadowing him. Later, inspired by memories of Silvia, he begins writing "Nord sud ovest est".
10	2	"Episode 2"	Alessio Lauria	Francesco Agostini, Marco Pettenello and Sydney Sibilia	9 October 2026
While working on their next album, Pier Paolo offers to set up a recording studio in the basement of Max's family home in Pavia, where the duo find inspiration most easily. However, Max struggles to write upbeat songs, haunted by visions of Silvia, who has left for Dublin. After meeting Michela, the fourth-place finalist at Miss Italia, he goes on a date with her. They kiss, but he leaves after seeing Silvia's ghost again.
11	3	"Episode 3"	Alessio Lauria	Francesco Agostini, Marco Pettenello and Sydney Sibilia	16 October 2026
Cecchetto urges the 883 to create more mature songs to surpass the success of their debut. Max attempts to reconnect with Michela and arranges to meet her at a New Year's Eve party. However, after a series of misadventures including an attack by ostriches, Max, Mauro, Nemorino and Cisco end up missing the party. Max reassures Mauro that making music together matters more than commercial success. On their way home, they begin writing "Rotta per casa di Dio". At dawn, Max apologizes to Michela, while Mauro realizes that "Come mai" represents the mature sound they seek.
12	4	"Episode 4"	Simone Godano	Francesco Agostini, Marco Pettenello and Sydney Sibilia	23 October 2026
Max writes "Sei un mito", inspired by his relationship with Michela, and Cecchetto decides to release it as the lead single with a music video. Aspiring singer Caterina is brought in to collaborate with the duo, but tensions lead the three to write "Aeroplano" together. Encouraged by Caterina, Max and Mauro take control of their artistic image and launch "Sei un mito" on Karaoke, hosted by their former roommate Fiorello. Meanwhile, Mauro convinces Max to include "Come mai" in the album, with the approval of Cecchetto.
13	5	"Episode 5"	Simone Godano	Francesco Agostini, Marco Pettenello and Sydney Sibilia	30 October 2026
Following the success of Nord sud ovest est, Max and Mauro find themselves dealing with newfound fame and wealth. While Mauro works on the music videos for the album's singles, Cisco struggles to keep his video game arcade Jolly Blue open. During a trip to Rome, Max and Mauro appear on Non è la Rai and arrange an evening out with some of the show's girls. However, when Max learns of Cisco's difficulties, they cut short their stay and return to Pavia. The group of friends reunite at the Jolly Blue before the 883 leave for the United States to shoot their next music videos.
14	6	"Episode 6"	Alice Filippi	Francesco Agostini, Marco Pettenello and Sydney Sibilia	6 November 2026
During the flight to Los Angeles, Mauro meets Brandi, a model returning to the United States, and falls in love with her. While filming the music videos for "Nord sud ovest est" and "Rotta per casa di Dio" in the desert with Max and screenwriter Carlo Lucarelli, Mauro grows frustrated with his marginal role. Encouraged by Max, he meets Brandi again, and the two share a passionate kiss. Brandi reveals her dream of becoming an actress. Although she asks him to stay in America, Mauro decides to return to Italy with Max. Back in Pavia, Max finds Silvia waiting for him at home.
15	7	"Episode 7"	Alice Filippi	Francesco Agostini and Sydney Sibilia	13 November 2026
After reuniting with Silvia, Max reveals that "Come mai" was written for her, and the two begin seeing each other again. The 883 win the Festivalbar with the song, but when invited to perform on stage, Max insists on singing both "Nord sud ovest est" and "Come mai" so that Mauro is not left out. However, Mauro increasingly feels sidelined as Fiorello takes his place alongside Max in television appearances. After meeting Brandi again in Milan, he decides to keep pursuing his dream. Meanwhile, Max writes "Gli anni", and when Mauro hears the song, he realises that his role in the 883 has come to an end. He bids farewell to Max, promising to meet him again on the Tuesday after Easter, before leaving for America.
16	8	"Episode 8"	Alice Filippi	Francesco Agostini and Sydney Sibilia	20 November 2026

== Release ==
The first season premiered on Sky Serie and began streaming on Now on 11 October 2024, with its finale airing on 1 November 2024. It was subsequently broadcast free-to-air on TV8 in November 2025.

The second season was released starting from 9 October 2026.
