= Gli anni (album) =

1998 greatest hits album by 883

- 2001 reissue's cover

Greatest hits album by 883
- Released: 1 July 1998
- Labels: FRI; East West
- Producers: Pier Paolo Peroni; Marco Guarnerio; Claudio Cecchetto

883 chronology
La dura legge del gol! (1997)	Gli anni (1998)	Grazie mille (1999)

Gli anni (transl. The Years) is the first greatest hits album by Italian pop group 883, released on 1 July 1998. The compilation features songs originally released between 1992 and 1997, alongside the previously unreleased track "Io ci sarò" and a new version of the title track, "Gli anni". It also includes demo recordings of Spanish-language adaptations of "Hanno ucciso l'Uomo Ragno" and "Come mai".

The album was released during a successful period for the group, shortly before their appearance in the film Jolly Blu. It became one of the best-selling Italian albums of 1998, reaching number one on the Italian albums chart and selling more than 500,000 copies in its first few months. A revised edition was released in 2001, replacing the two Spanish-language demos with a live cover of "Leggero" by Luciano Ligabue.

The album has enjoyed enduring commercial success, returning to the Italian chart on several occasions over the years, including in 2012, 2025 and 2026, when it reached a peak of number 9.

== Track listing ==
Gli anni original edition (1998)
No.	Title	Length
1.	"Io ci sarò"	4:38
2.	"Nord sud ovest est"	4:30
3.	"Tieni il tempo"	3:35
4.	"Rotta per casa di Dio"	4:52
5.	"Una canzone d'amore"	5:32
6.	"Hanno ucciso l'Uomo Ragno"	4:12
7.	"Nella notte"	4:22
8.	"Nessun rimpianto"	4:23
9.	"Sei un mito"	5:06
10.	"Gli anni ('96)"	4:34
11.	"Come mai"	4:15
12.	"La regola dell'amico"	4:03
13.	"Senza averti qui"	3:47
14.	"Con un deca"	4:57
15.	"Ti sento vivere"	3:56
16.	"Andrà tutto bene ('58)"	4:23
17.	"Han matado el hombre araña" (Demo)	2:17
18.	"Quien serás" (Demo)	2:58

Gli anni reissue (2001)
No.	Title	Writer(s)	Length
17.	"Leggero" (Live)	Luciano Ligabue	4:49

== Charts ==
Chart (1998)	Peak position
Italian Albums (FIMI)	1
Italian Albums (Musica e dischi)	1
Swiss Albums (Schweizer Hitparade)	22
Chart (2026)	Peak position
Italian Albums (FIMI)	9

== Certifications ==
Certifications for Gli anni
Region	Certification	Certified units/sales
Italy (FIMI)	2× Platinum	100,000^{‡}
^{‡} Sales+streaming figures based on certification alone.
