= Max 20 =

2013 compilation album by Max Pezzali

Compilation album by Max Pezzali
- Released: 4 June 2013
- Label: Warner
- Producers: Claudio Cecchetto; Pier Paolo Peroni

Max Pezzali chronology
Hanno ucciso l'Uomo Ragno 2012 (2012)	Max 20 (2013)	Astronave Max (2015)

Max 20 is a compilation album by Italian singer-songwriter Max Pezzali, released on 4 June 2013 by Warner. It consists of fourteen Pezzali and 883 songs, re-recorded as duets with other Italian artists, and five original songs. The album was preceded by the single "L'universo tranne noi".

The album features guest appearances by Claudio Baglioni, Edoardo Bennato, Cesare Cremonini, Elio, Fiorello, Gianluca Grignani, Jovanotti, Nek, Raf, Eros Ramazzotti, Francesco Renga, Giuliano Sangiorgi, Davide Van De Sfroos and Antonello Venditti. It also marked the return of former 883 member Mauro Repetto, who co-wrote the lyrics of the first two tracks and performs on "Welcome Mr. President".

Three weeks after its release, Max 20 was certified gold in Italy for sales exceeding 30,000 copies. Approximately two months after its release, it reached the top of the weekly Italian sales chart. In January 2014, it was certified double platinum for sales exceeding 100,000 copies. It was the tenth best-selling album in Italy in 2013.

== Track listing ==
No.	Title	Length
1.	"Welcome Mr. President (Note: Additional vocals by Mauro Repetto)"	2:13
2.	"Il presidente di tutto il mondo"	3:46
3.	"I cowboy non mollano"	4:12
4.	"Ragazzo inadeguato"	3:41
5.	"L'universo tranne noi"	4:13
6.	"Tieni il tempo 2013" (featuring Jovanotti)	3:35
7.	"Lo strano percorso" (featuring Eros Ramazzotti)	4:09
8.	"Ti sento vivere" (featuring Giuliano Sangiorgi)	3:52
9.	"Gli anni" (featuring Cesare Cremonini)	4:14
10.	"Come mai" (featuring Claudio Baglioni)	4:15
11.	"Sei un mito" (featuring Fiorello)	4:20
12.	"Quello che capita" (featuring Antonello Venditti)	4:00
13.	"Sei fantastica" (featuring Raf)	3:42
14.	"Come deve andare" (featuring Davide Van De Sfroos)	4:33
15.	"Nessun rimpianto" (featuring Nek)	4:41
16.	"Eccoti" (featuring Francesco Renga)	4:03
17.	"La dura legge del gol" (featuring Edoardo Bennato)	4:41
18.	"Rotta per casa di Dio" (featuring Gianluca Grignani)	4:59
19.	"Nord sud ovest est" (featuring Elio)	4:27

iTunes edition
No.	Title	Length
20.	"L'universo tranne noi (Orchestral Version)"	4:13

== Charts ==
=== Weekly charts ===
Weekly chart performance for Max 20
Chart (2013)	Peak position
Italian Albums (FIMI)	1
Swiss Albums (Schweizer Hitparade)	51

=== Year-end charts ===
Year-end chart performance for Max 20
Chart (2013)	Position
Italian Albums (FIMI)	10
Chart (2014)	Position
Italian Albums (FIMI)	51

== Certifications ==
Certifications for Max 20
Region	Certification	Certified units/sales
Italy (FIMI)	2× Platinum	100,000^{*}
^{‡} Sales+streaming figures based on certification alone.
