= Jolly Blu =

1998 Italian musical comedy film

- Film poster
- Jolly Blu – Il film degli 883
- Directed by: Stefano Salvati
- Story by: Max Pezzali
- Produced by: Claudio Cecchetto
- Starring: Max Pezzali
- Cinematography: Franco Balboni
- Music by: 883
- Distributed by: Medusa Film
- Release date: 6 November 1998 (Italy)
- Country: Italy
- Language: Italian

Jolly Blu is a 1998 Italian musical comedy film directed by Stefano Salvati, based on a story by Max Pezzali and featuring music by the Italian pop group 883. The film features Pezzali as a fictionalized version of himself and incorporates songs from the group's repertoire.

== Plot ==
Max and his friends regularly meet at the Jolly Blu, a local bar owned by Baldo. When Baldo faces financial difficulties and risks losing the business, Max and his friends organize a concert to raise money to help him. During the event, Max attracts the attention of a talent scout, who arranges an audition with a record company executive. Impressed by his performance, the executive offers Max the opportunity to record an album. Meanwhile, the film follows the romantic relationships and everyday lives of Max's friends.

== Cast ==
- Max Pezzali as himself
- Gabriele Baldoni as Baldo
- Giuliano Brunazzi as Enrico
- Francesco Casale as Paolo
- Dario Cassini as Alex
- Sara D'Amario as Anna
- Angelo D'Amelio as Angelo
- Massimo Di Michele as Michele
- Mirco Gennari as Tato
- Kimberly Anne Greene as Kim
- Stefano Lucchi as Il Cinno
- Federico Marras as Cisco
- Daniele Moretto as Daniele
- Andrea Porti as Tino
- Maurizio Rapotec as Il Losco
- Cinzia Veronesi as Francesca
- Jovanotti as the record company president
- Sabrina Salerno as the bar's legend
- Natalia Estrada as the dancer
- Alessia Merz as Beatrice
- Saturnino as a talent scout
- Nicole Grimaudo as an aspiring singer

== Production ==
The film was conceived as a vehicle for the songs of 883, whose music provides much of its structure. Its episodic narrative combines stories about young people and their relationships with musical performances, recalling the Italian musical film tradition known as musicarello. A young Angelina Jolie auditioned for the role of Beatrice, which ultimately went to Alessia Merz, but was rejected because director Stefano Salvati considered her too sensual for the part.

== Music ==
The film features songs performed by 883, including "Un giorno così", "Sei un mito", "Jolly Blue", "Come mai", "Tieni il tempo", "Una canzone d'amore", "Rotta per casa di Dio", "Se tornerai", "Hanno ucciso l'Uomo Ragno", and "Io ci sarò".

== Reception ==
The film received negative critical reception. In 1999, Corriere della Sera included it among the worst films of 1998.
