= Come deve andare =

2001 song by 883

Single by 883

from the album Uno in più
- Released: 2001
- Length: 4:35
- Label: Warner
- Songwriter: Max Pezzali
- Producers: Pier Paolo Peroni; Carlo Ubaldo Rossi; Alberto Tafuri

883 singles chronology
"La lunga estate caldissima" (2001)	"Come deve andare" (2001)	"Uno in più" (2001)

Music video
- "Come deve andare" on YouTube

"Come deve andare" (transl. How It Should Go) is a song by Italian pop group 883, originally released in June 2001 as a track on their sixth studio album, Uno in più. It was subsequently released as the album's third single in October 2001.

The song reflects the transition into adulthood and the acceptance of the uncertainties of life. Magazine Vanity Fair described it as a meditation on entering the age of reason, considering it perhaps the finest song of the group's later years and an anticipation of Max Pezzali's solo career.

It was later included on the compilation albums Love/Life, Tutto Max and Max 20. The latter features a new version performed by Pezzali with singer-songwriter Davide Van De Sfroos.

== Music video ==
The music video was directed by the Manetti Bros. and depicts a fictional World Chess Championship final between two Soviet players, Kedrov and Kolosimo. Max Pezzali portrays a cleaner at the venue who discovers a winning move and finds a way to communicate it to one of the contestants.

== Track listing ==
No.	Title	Length
1.	"Come deve andare"	4:35
2.	"Bella vera" (European remix)
3.	"Cloro" (Provino Cortona) (featuring Jovanotti)

== Charts ==
Chart (2001–2002)	Peak position
Italy (FIMI)	37
Italy (Musica e dischi)	37
