= Love/Life =

2002 greatest hits album by 883

Greatest hits album by 883
- Released: 8 November 2002
- Length: 78:45
- Label: Warner
- Producers: Pier Paolo Peroni; Marco Guarnerio; Claudio Cecchetto

883 chronology
Uno in più (2001)	Love/Life (2002)	Tutto Max (2005)

Love/Life, subtitled L'amore e la vita al tempo degli 883 (transl. Love and Life in the Time of 883), is a greatest hits album by Italian pop group 883, released on 8 November 2002 by Warner Music Italy. It was the group's second compilation, following Gli anni (1998), and their final album under the 883 name. Shortly after its release, frontman Max Pezzali began his solo career. The album cover credits both Pezzali and 883, reflecting this transition.

The compilation focuses on songs about love and relationships, bringing together ballads and other tracks from the group's earlier albums. The album also contains a new song, "Quello che capita", and "Ci sono anch'io", the Italian adaptation of "I'm Still Here (Jim's Theme)" by John Rzeznik for the soundtrack of the Disney animated film Treasure Planet.

== Track listing ==
No.	Title	Length
1.	"Ci sono anch'io" ("I'm Still Here (Jim's Theme)")	3:43
2.	"Quello che capita"	4:51
3.	"Una canzone d'amore"	5:32
4.	"Se tornerai"	3:39
5.	"Come mai"	4:15
6.	"Nessun rimpianto"	4:23
7.	"Come deve andare"	4:35
8.	"Tutto ciò che ho"	4:32
9.	"Io ci sarò"	4:38
10.	"Senza averti qui"	3:47
11.	"La dura legge del gol"	5:02
12.	"Gli anni ('96)"	4:34
13.	"Nient'altro che noi"	4:33
14.	"Le luci di Natale"	4:41
15.	"Andrà tutto bene"	4:14
16.	"Ti sento vivere"	3:56
17.	"Weekend"	3:47
18.	"Grazie mille"	4:03

== Charts ==
=== Weekly charts ===
Weekly chart performance for Love/Life
Chart (2002–2003)	Peak position
Italian Albums (FIMI)	6
Italian Albums (Musica e dischi)	8

=== Year-end charts ===
Year-end chart performance for Love/Life
Chart (2002)	Position
Italian Albums (FIMI)	38
Chart (2003)	Position
Italian Albums (FIMI)	70
