= Il mondo insieme a te =

2004 studio album by Max Pezzali

Studio album by Max Pezzali
- Released: 28 May 2004
- Length: 40:42
- Labels: Warner; FRI
- Producers: Pier Paolo Peroni; Marco Guarnerio; Claudio Cecchetto

Max Pezzali chronology
| Love/Life (2002) | Il mondo insieme a te (2004) | Tutto Max (2005) |

Il mondo insieme a te (transl. The World Together with You) is the debut solo studio album by Italian singer-songwriter Max Pezzali, released on 28 May 2004 by Warner and Free Records Independent. It marked Pezzali's first album following the end of 883, whose final release, Love/Life, had been credited to both Pezzali and the group.

Three singles were released to promote the album, namely "Lo strano percorso", "Il mondo insieme a te" and "Fai come ti pare". It sold more than 200,000 copies in Italy and was certified double platinum.

== Track listing ==
| No. | Title | Length |
|---|---|---|
| 1. | "Fai come ti pare" | 3:38 |
| 2. | "Lo strano percorso" | 4:10 |
| 3. | "La volta buona" | 3:54 |
| 4. | "Eccoti" | 4:36 |
| 5. | "Siamo io e te" | 4:06 |
| 6. | "Il mondo insieme a te" | 4:03 |
| 7. | "Con dentro me" | 4:07 |
| 8. | "Me la caverò" | 3:41 |
| 9. | "Essenziale" | 4:03 |
| 10. | "Mai uguali" | 4:24 |

== Charts ==
=== Weekly charts ===
| Chart (2004) | Peak position |
|---|---|
| Italian Albums (FIMI) | 1 |
| Swiss Albums (Schweizer Hitparade) | 81 |

=== Year-end charts ===
| Chart (2004) | Position |
|---|---|
| Italian Albums (FIMI) | 19 |
