= Rotta per casa di Dio =

Single by 883

from the album Nord sud ovest est
- Released: 1993
- Length: 4:52
- Label: FRI
- Songwriters: Max Pezzali; Mauro Repetto
- Producers: Pier Paolo Peroni; Marco Guarnerio; Claudio Cecchetto

883 singles chronology
"Ma perché" (1993)	"Rotta per casa di Dio" (1993)	"Nella notte" (1993)

Music video
- "Rotta per casa di Dio" on YouTube

"Rotta per casa di Dio" (stylized as "Rotta x casa di Dio", transl. Heading to God's House) is a song by Italian pop group 883, released in 1993 as a single from their second studio album, Nord sud ovest est.

The song tells the story of a group of friends attempting to reach a party, whose plans are derailed by a series of mishaps and disorganized decisions, ultimately leading them to rediscover the value of friendship and the bond they share. It has been described as capturing the carefree spirit of youth set against the backdrop of provincial Italian life, where even the most ordinary situations become opportunities to escape boredom. It was inspired by winter journeys undertaken by Max Pezzali and Mauro Repetto to the Mayerling nightclub in Castellar Guidobono, where they organized a concert. The journeys were often made difficult by fog. Its title and lyrics, which contain numerous profanities, led to the song being censored by radio stations.

It was also included on several compilation albums, such as Gli anni, Tutto Max and Le canzoni alla radio. A new version featuring Gianluca Grignani was included on Max 20, while a live version featuring Riccardo Zanotti of Pinguini Tattici Nucleari was recorded during Pezzali's 2023 concert at the Circus Maximus in Rome and released on Max Forever: Vol.1.

The events that inspired the song's composition, and the production of its music video are fictionalized in the second season of the television series Accidentally Famous (2026).

== Track listing ==
=== CD single ===
No.	Title	Length
1.	"Rotta per casa di Dio" (Album version)	4:52
2.	"Ma perché" (114 BPM mix)	4:10
3.	"Rotta per casa di Dio" (Remix version)	4:53
4.	"Ma perché" (120 BPM mix)	4:40
5.	"Nord sud ovest est" (Dance remix)	5:31
6.	"Rotta per casa di Dio" (Karaoke version)	4:52

== Charts ==
Chart (1993)	Peak position
Italy (Musica e dischi)	9
