= Bella vera =

2001 song by 883

Single by 883

from the album Uno in più
- Released: April 2001
- Length: 3:29
- Label: Warner
- Songwriter: Max Pezzali
- Producers: Pier Paolo Peroni; Carlo Ubaldo Rossi; Alberto Tafuri

883 singles chronology
"La regina del Celebrità" (2000)	"Bella vera" (2001)	"La lunga estate caldissima" (2001)

Music video
- "Bella vera" on YouTube

"Bella vera" (transl. Beautiful for Real) is a song by Italian pop group 883, released in April 2001 as the lead single from their sixth studio album, Uno in più.

The song received significant radio airplay and commercial success in Italy, becoming one of the summer hits of 2001. That year, it was also used as the theme song for the Miss Italia beauty pageant.

== Music video ==
The music video was directed by the Manetti Bros. and filmed in Los Angeles. In the video, Pezzali portrays a stereotypical American used-car salesman who runs a dealership called Max Cars. A beauty pageant takes place at the dealership, with the winner selected through a telephone vote.

== Track listing ==
No.	Title	Length
1.	"Bella vera"	3:29
2.	"Bella vera" (Instrumental)	3:29
3.	"Tieni il tempo" (European remix)	3:41
4.	"Nord sud ovest est" (European remix)	4:49
5.	"Nella notte" (European remix)	4:31

== Charts ==
Chart (2001)	Peak position
Italy (FIMI)	6
Italy (Musica e dischi)	8

== Certifications ==
Certifications for "Bella vera"
Region	Certification	Certified units/sales
Italy (FIMI)	Gold	35,000^{‡}
^{‡} Sales+streaming figures based on certification alone.
