= La dura legge del gol! =

Studio album by 883
- Released: 18 June 1997
- Label: FRI
- Producers: Claudio Cecchetto; Marco Guarnerio; Pier Paolo Peroni

883 chronology
La donna, il sogno e il grande incubo (1995)	La dura legge del gol! (1997)	Gli anni (1998)

La dura legge del gol! (Italian for The Harsh Law of the Goal!) is the fourth studio album by Italian pop group 883, released on 18 June 1997 through FRI by Claudio Cecchetto. It was the group's second album following the departure of co-founder Mauro Repetto, who nevertheless remained involved as a songwriter on "Se tornerai" and "Finalmente tu". The album includes the singles "Un giorno così", "La regola dell'amico", "Nessun rimpianto" and "La dura legge del gol".

The cover depicts Max Pezzali performing a bicycle kick, recreating the pose made famous by footballer Carlo Parola in a 1950 photograph taken by Corrado Banchi, which became one of the most recognizable images associated with Panini's football stickers. The album topped the Italian chart and ranked among the country's best-selling albums of 1997. A report published by Adnkronos in December 1997 listed sales of approximately 610,000 copies for the album that year.

In 2000, the album was reissued by Warner Music Italy with six additional tracks, including previously unreleased material and remixes.

== Track listing ==
La dura legge del gol! (1997)
No.	Title	Length
1.	"Innamorare tanto"	4:09
2.	"La regola dell'amico"	4:03
3.	"Nessun rimpianto"	4:23
4.	"Non ti passa più"	3:39
5.	"Se tornerai"	3:39
6.	"La dura legge del gol"	5:02
7.	"Un giorno così"	4:22
8.	"Andrà tutto bene"	4:14
9.	"Finalmente tu"	2:48
10.	"Non mi arrendo"	4:36

La dura legge del gol! – Edizione straordinaria (2000)
No.	Title	Length
11.	"Dimmi perché" (Remix)	4:19
12.	"TPS" (Demo)	4:15
13.	"Innamorare tanto" (Silver Mix)	5:39
14.	"La regola dell'amico" (Silver Mix)	4:26
15.	"Se tornerai" (Book Remix)	4:17
16.	"La dura legge del gol" (Casa Sonica Remix)	5:23

== Charts ==
Chart (1997)	Peak position
Italian Albums (FIMI)	1
Italian Albums (Musica e dischi)	2
Swiss Albums (Schweizer Hitparade)	12
Chart (2026)	Peak position
Italian Albums (FIMI)	41

== Certifications ==
Certifications for La dura legge del gol!
Region	Certification	Certified units/sales
Italy (FIMI)	Gold	25,000^{‡}
^{‡} Sales+streaming figures based on certification alone.
