= Viaggio al centro del mondo =

1999 song by 883

Single by 883

from the album Grazie mille
- Released: July 1999
- Length: 3:56
- Label: FRI; WEA
- Songwriter: Max Pezzali
- Producers: Pier Paolo Peroni; Marco Guarnerio

883 singles chronology
"Io ci sarò" (1998)	"Viaggio al centro del mondo" (1999)	"Grazie mille" (1999)

Music video
- "Viaggio al centro del mondo" on YouTube

"Viaggio al centro del mondo" (transl. Journey to the Center of the World) is a song by Italian pop group 883, released in July 1999 as the lead single from their fifth studio album, Grazie mille.

The song explores the idea of a metaphorical journey beyond one's familiar surroundings in search of new experiences, inspiration and personal fulfilment. The song draws on futuristic imagery associated with Tokyo, evoking a vision of the city shaped by anime and science fiction.

The music video for "Viaggio al centro del mondo" was filmed in Tokyo.

== Release ==
The single was released in several formats in 1999, including a 12-inch vinyl record and a maxi-CD single. The CD edition also included Spanish-language versions of two previous songs, "Lleva el tiempo" and "Noroeste sureste". In 2000, a further maxi-CD single was released featuring remixes by Jeo, Eiffel 65 and Gabry Ponte.

== Track listing ==
=== 1999 12-inch maxi-single ===
Side A

No.	Title	Length
1.	"Viaggio al centro del mondo" (Mosso club)	5:55
2.	"Viaggio al centro del mondo" (Mosso radio edit)	4:04

Side B

No.	Title	Length
1.	"Viaggio al centro del mondo" (Mosso latino)	5:19
2.	"Viaggio al centro del mondo" (Album version)	3:54

=== 1999 maxi-CD single ===
No.	Title	Length
1.	"Viaggio al centro del mondo"	3:56
2.	"Viaggio al centro del mondo" (Mosso remix)	4:03
3.	"Lleva el tiempo"	3:34
4.	"Noroeste sureste"	4:27

=== 2000 maxi-CD single ===
No.	Title	Length
1.	"Viaggio al centro del mondo" (Jeo's remix radio version)	3:50
2.	"Viaggio al centro del mondo" (Eiffel 65 remix, Gabry Ponte radio cut)	4:18
3.	"Viaggio al centro del mondo" (Eiffel 65 remix, Gabry Ponte main)	5:34
4.	"Grazie mille" (Album version)	4:02

== Charts ==
Chart (1999)	Peak position
Italy (FIMI)	5
Italy (Musica e dischi)	12
