= La lunga estate caldissima =

2001 song by 883

- CD cover art

Single by 883

from the album Uno in più
- Released: July 2001
- Length: 3:44
- Label: Warner
- Songwriter: Max Pezzali
- Producers: Pier Paolo Peroni; Carlo Ubaldo Rossi; Alberto Tafuri

883 singles chronology
"Bella vera" (2001)	"La lunga estate caldissima" (2001)	"Come deve andare" (2001)

Music video
- "La lunga estate caldissima" on YouTube

"La lunga estate caldissima" (transl. The Long, Very Hot Summer) is a song by Italian pop group 883, released in July 2001 as the second single from their sixth studio album, Uno in più. The song was written by Max Pezzali and produced by Pier Paolo Peroni, Carlo Ubaldo Rossi and Alberto Tafuri.

The song was performed by 883 at Festivalbar, alongside the album's lead single, "Bella vera". Both songs became summer hits in Italy that year. In 2016, Italian magazine TV Sorrisi e Canzoni included it among the ten major hits of Pezzali's career.

== Music video ==
The music video was directed by the Manetti Bros. and filmed in Los Angeles. It continues the visual narrative of the video for "Bella vera", with Pezzali wearing a cowboy hat and driving a long American convertible with the same women from the earlier video.

== Track listing ==
=== CD maxi-single ===
No.	Title	Length
1.	"La lunga estate caldissima"	3:44
2.	"La lunga estate caldissima (dell'ottanta)"	4:08
3.	"La lunga estate caldissima" (Super DJ Megamix)	3:46
4.	"La lunga estate caldissima" (Hot Summer Remix)	4:31
5.	"La lunga estate caldissima" (Happy Summer Remix)	4:05

=== 12-inch maxi-single ===
Side A

No.	Title	Length
1.	"La lunga estate caldissima (dell'ottanta)" (Extended Version)	4:55
2.	"La lunga estate caldissima" (Super DJ Megamix Extended)	5:25

Side B

No.	Title	Length
1.	"La lunga estate caldissima" (Hot Summer Extended)	5:49
2.	"La lunga estate caldissima" (Happy Summer Extended)	6:09

== Charts ==
Chart (2001)	Peak position
Italy (FIMI)	19
Italy (Musica e dischi)	19
