= List of number-one hits of 1993 (Italy) =

This is a list of the number-one hits of 1993 on Italian Hit Parade Singles Chart.

Issue Date	Song	Artist(s)
January 2	"Dur dur d'être bébé!"	Jordy
January 9	"Dur dur d'être bébé!"	Jordy
January 16	"Gli spari sopra"	Vasco Rossi
January 23	"Gli spari sopra"	Vasco Rossi
January 30	"Gli spari sopra"	Vasco Rossi
February 6	"Gli spari sopra"	Vasco Rossi
February 13	"Gli spari sopra"	Vasco Rossi
February 20	"Gli spari sopra"	Vasco Rossi
February 27	"If I Ever Lose My Faith in You"	Sting
March 6	"Mistero"	Enrico Ruggeri
March 13	"La solitudine"	Laura Pausini
March 20	"La solitudine"	Laura Pausini
March 27	"La solitudine"	Laura Pausini
April 3	"Sei un mito"	883
April 10	"Sei un mito"	883
April 17	"Sei un mito"	883
April 24	"Sei un mito"	883
May 1	"Sei un mito"	883
May 8	"Sei un mito"	883
May 15	"Sei un mito"	883
May 22	"Sei un mito"	883
May 29	"Sei un mito"	883
June 5	"All That She Wants"	Ace of Base
June 12	"All That She Wants"	Ace of Base
June 19	"What Is Love"	Haddaway
June 26	"What Is Love"	Haddaway
July 3	"What Is Love"	Haddaway
July 10	"What Is Love"	Haddaway
July 17	"All That She Wants"	Ace of Base
July 24	"All That She Wants"	Ace of Base
July 31	"Gli spari sopra"	Vasco Rossi
August 7	"Gli spari sopra"	Vasco Rossi
August 14	"Gli spari sopra"	Vasco Rossi
August 21	"All That She Wants"	Ace of Base
August 28	"All That She Wants"	Ace of Base
September 4	"All That She Wants"	Ace of Base
September 11	"All That She Wants"	Ace of Base
September 18	"Mr. Vain"	Culture Beat
September 25	"Mr. Vain"	Culture Beat
October 2	"Living on My Own"	Freddie Mercury
October 9	"Living on My Own"	Freddie Mercury
October 16	"Living on My Own"	Freddie Mercury
October 23	"Living on My Own"	Freddie Mercury
October 30	"Living on My Own"	Freddie Mercury
November 6	"Living on My Own"	Freddie Mercury
November 13	"Living on My Own"	Freddie Mercury
November 20	"Living on My Own"	Freddie Mercury
November 27	"Come mai"	883 & Fiorello
December 4	"Living on My Own"	Freddie Mercury
December 11	"Living on My Own"	Freddie Mercury
December 18	"Penso positivo"	Jovanotti
December 25	"Penso positivo"	Jovanotti
