= Un giorno così =

1997 song by Italian group 883

Single by 883

from the album La dura legge del gol!
- Released: May 1997
- Label: FRI
- Songwriter: Max Pezzali
- Producers: Pier Paolo Peroni; Marco Guarnerio; Claudio Cecchetto

883 singles chronology
"Gli anni" (1995)	"Un giorno così" (1997)	"La regola dell'amico" (1997)

"Un giorno così" (transl. A Day Like This) is a song by Italian pop group 883, released in 1997 as the lead single from their fourth studio album, La dura legge del gol!. The song features references to motorcycling, which are also reflected in its music video. It reached number one on the Italian singles chart.

The song was later included on Max Pezzali's compilation album Tutto Max. It was also used in the soundtracks of Pezzali's film Jolly Blu (1998) and the American romantic comedy film Letters to Juliet (2010). In 2013, it was also the theme of Le strade di Max, an on-the-road programme hosted by Pezzali on DeeJay TV.

== Track listing ==
=== CD single ===
No.	Title	Length
1.	"Un giorno così" (In giro con la XR-1000)	3:35
2.	"Un giorno così" (In giro con la Electra Glide)	3:35
3.	"Un giorno così" (Instrumental)	4:08
4.	"Un giorno così" (Rebaldimix)	5:02
5.	"Innamorare tanto" (Instrumental)	4:01

=== 12-inch maxi-single ===
Side A

No.	Title	Length
1.	"Un giorno così" (Rebaldimix)	5:02
2.	"Un giorno così" (In giro con la XR-1000)	4:08

Side B

No.	Title	Length
1.	"Innamorare tanto" (Instrumental)	4:01
2.	"Un giorno così" (In giro con la Electra Glide)	4:08

== Charts ==
Chart (1997)	Peak position
Italy (FIMI)	1
Italy (Musica e dischi)	12
