= Gli anni =

Single by 883

from the album La donna, il sogno e il grande incubo
- Released: 1996
- Label: FRI
- Songwriter: Max Pezzali
- Producers: Pier Paolo Peroni; Marco Guarnerio; Claudio Cecchetto

883 singles chronology
| "Ti sento vivere" (1995) | "Gli anni" (1996) | "Un giorno così" (1997) |

Music video
- "Gli anni" on YouTube

"Gli anni" (transl. The Years) is a song by Italian pop group 883, included as the eleventh track on their third studio album, La donna, il sogno e il grande incubo, released in 1995. It was subsequently released as a single in early 1996. The song reflects on the passage of time and nostalgia for youth, recalling popular culture and everyday experiences associated with the 1980s, including the television series Happy Days and the social lives of young people at the time.

Although the song is officially credited to Max Pezzali, former band member Mauro Repetto later confirmed that it was the last song the two wrote together. Repetto chose not to receive a writing credit because he felt that the song no longer represented the artistic direction he wanted to pursue.

The song's title was later used for the band's first greatest hits album, Gli anni, released in 1998.

In 2013, Pezzali recorded a new version featuring Cesare Cremonini, included on his compilation album Max 20. In 2017, Pezzali, Nek and Francesco Renga released a version of the song as a trio.

== Track listing ==
=== Remix maxi-single ===
Side A

| No. | Title | Length |
|---|---|---|
| 1. | "Gli anni" (Bliss Team Classic Remix) | 5:06 |
| 2. | "Gli anni" (Bliss Team Downbeat Remix) | 5:39 |

Side B

| No. | Title | Length |
|---|---|---|
| 1. | "Gli anni" (Giorgino Remix) | 5:38 |
| 2. | "Gli anni" (1996 version) | 4:34 |

== Charts ==
| Chart (1996) | Peak position |
|---|---|
| Italy (Musica e dischi) | 20 |
| Chart (2026) | Peak position |
| Italy (FIMI) | 40 |

== Certifications ==
Certifications for "Gli anni"
| Region | Certification | Certified units/sales |
|---|---|---|
| Italy (FIMI) | 3× Platinum | 300,000^{‡} |
^{‡} Sales+streaming figures based on certification alone.

== Cover versions ==
- In 2012, Colapesce recorded a version of the song for Con due deca, a tribute compilation organized by music website Rockit to mark the twentieth anniversary of Hanno ucciso l'Uomo Ragno.
- In 2013, rapper Jake La Furia released "Gli anni d'oro", a track inspired by the 883 song and reworked in an autobiographical style. It was included on his debut solo album Musica commerciale.
- In June 2014, Sister Cristina performed the song with her coach J-Ax during the final of the second season of The Voice of Italy.
- In 2021, singer-songwriter Gio Evan performed the song with contestants from the first season of The Voice Senior during the cover night of the Sanremo Music Festival 2021.
