= List of number-one hits of 2007 (Italy) =

This is a list of the number-one hits of 2007 on FIMI's Italian Singles, Download, and Albums Charts.

== Singles and downloads ==
Week	Issue date	Physical singles		Digital singles	
Week	Issue date	Song	Artist	Song	Artist
1	5 January	"Io canto"	Laura Pausini	"All Good Things (Come to an End)"	Nelly Furtado
2	12 January	"Window in the Skies"	U2	"All Good Things (Come to an End)"	Nelly Furtado
3	19 January	"Window in the Skies"	U2	"Basta poco"	Vasco Rossi
4	26 January	"Window in the Skies"	U2	"Basta poco"	Vasco Rossi
5	2 February	"Window in the Skies"	U2	"Basta poco"	Vasco Rossi
6	9 February	"Vorrei dirti che è facile"	Brenda and Daniele Battaglia	"Meravigliosa creatura"	Gianna Nannini
7	16 February	"Vorrei dirti che è facile"	Brenda and Daniele Battaglia	"Meravigliosa creatura"	Gianna Nannini
8	23 February	"Grace Kelly"	Mika	"Meravigliosa creatura"	Gianna Nannini
9	2 March	"Musica"	Paolo Meneguzzi	"Grace Kelly"	Mika
10	9 March	"Qué Hiciste"	Jennifer Lopez	"La paranza"	Daniele Silvestri
11	16 March	"Qué Hiciste"	Jennifer Lopez	"Ti regalerò una rosa"	Simone Cristicchi
12	23 March	"Pensa"	Fabrizio Moro	"Ti regalerò una rosa"	Simone Cristicchi
13	30 March	"Girlfriend"	Avril Lavigne	"Grace Kelly"	Mika
14	6 April	"Girlfriend"	Avril Lavigne	"Grace Kelly"	Mika
15	13 April	"Beautiful Liar"	Beyoncé and Shakira	"Everything"	Michael Bublé
16	20 April	"Beautiful Liar"	Beyoncé and Shakira	"Everything"	Michael Bublé
17	27 April	"Beautiful Liar"	Beyoncé and Shakira	"Everything"	Michael Bublé
18	4 May	"Beautiful Liar"	Beyoncé and Shakira	"Everything"	Michael Bublé
19	11 May	"Vasco Extended Play"	Vasco Rossi	"Come Vasco Rossi"	Gaia & Luna
20	18 May	"Vasco Extended Play"	Vasco Rossi	"La compagnia"	Vasco Rossi
21	25 May	"Vasco Extended Play"	Vasco Rossi	"Come Vasco Rossi"	Gaia & Luna
22	1 June	"Vasco Extended Play"	Vasco Rossi	"La compagnia"	Vasco Rossi
23	8 June	"Vasco Extended Play"	Vasco Rossi	"Come Vasco Rossi"	Gaia & Luna
24	15 June	"Vasco Extended Play"	Vasco Rossi	"Come Vasco Rossi"	Gaia & Luna
25	22 June	"Vasco Extended Play"	Vasco Rossi	"Come Vasco Rossi"	Gaia & Luna
26	29 June	"Vasco Extended Play"	Vasco Rossi	"Relax, Take It Easy"	Mika
27	6 July	"Vasco Extended Play"	Vasco Rossi	"Niente da perdere"	Simone
28	13 July	"Vasco Extended Play"	Vasco Rossi	"Relax, Take It Easy"	Mika
29	20 July	"Vasco Extended Play"	Vasco Rossi	"Relax, Take It Easy"	Mika
30	27 July	"Vasco Extended Play"	Vasco Rossi	"Relax, Take It Easy"	Mika
31	3 August	"Vasco Extended Play"	Vasco Rossi	"Relax, Take It Easy"	Mika
32	10 August	"Vasco Extended Play"	Vasco Rossi	"Relax, Take It Easy"	Mika
33	17 August	"Vasco Extended Play"	Vasco Rossi	"Relax, Take It Easy"	Mika
34	24 August	"Vasco Extended Play"	Vasco Rossi	"Relax, Take It Easy"	Mika
35	31 August	"Vasco Extended Play"	Vasco Rossi	"Relax, Take It Easy"	Mika
36	7 September	"Vasco Extended Play"	Vasco Rossi	"Domo Mia"	Tazenda featuring Eros Ramazzotti
37	14 September	"Vasco Extended Play"	Vasco Rossi	"Domo Mia"	Tazenda featuring Eros Ramazzotti
38	21 September	"Vasco Extended Play"	Vasco Rossi	"Domo Mia"	Tazenda featuring Eros Ramazzotti
39	28 September	"Vasco Extended Play"	Vasco Rossi	"Non siamo soli"	Eros Ramazzotti and Ricky Martin
40	5 October	"Non siamo soli"	Eros Ramazzotti and Ricky Martin	"Non siamo soli"	Eros Ramazzotti and Ricky Martin
41	12 October	"Non siamo soli"	Eros Ramazzotti and Ricky Martin	"Non siamo soli"	Eros Ramazzotti and Ricky Martin
42	19 October	"Non siamo soli"	Eros Ramazzotti and Ricky Martin	"Non siamo soli"	Eros Ramazzotti and Ricky Martin
43	26 October	"Non siamo soli"	Eros Ramazzotti and Ricky Martin	"No One"	Alicia Keys
44	2 November	"Non siamo soli"	Eros Ramazzotti and Ricky Martin	"Niente paura"	Ligabue
45	9 November	"Non siamo soli"	Eros Ramazzotti and Ricky Martin	"Niente paura"	Ligabue
46	16 November	"Non siamo soli"	Eros Ramazzotti and Ricky Martin	"Niente paura"	Ligabue
47	23 November	"Non siamo soli"	Eros Ramazzotti and Ricky Martin	"Niente paura"	Ligabue
48	30 November	"Non siamo soli"	Eros Ramazzotti and Ricky Martin	"Niente paura"	Ligabue
49	7 December	"Non siamo soli"	Eros Ramazzotti and Ricky Martin	"Niente paura"	Ligabue
50	14 December	"Non siamo soli"	Eros Ramazzotti and Ricky Martin	"No One"	Alicia Keys
51	21 December	"The Singles Collection - Limited Tour Edition"	Vasco Rossi	"Baby Let's Play House"	Elvis Presley
52	28 December	Chart abolished	Chart abolished	"Niente paura"	Ligabue

== Albums ==
Issue date	Album	Artist
5 January	Io canto	Laura Pausini
12 January	Soundtrack '96-'06	Elisa
19 January	Soundtrack '96-'06	Elisa
26 January	The Confessions Tour	Madonna
2 February	The Confessions Tour	Madonna
9 February	Il vuoto	Franco Battiato
16 February	Soundtrack '96-'06	Elisa
23 February	Handful of Soul	Mario Biondi and the High Five Quintet
2 March	Soundtrack '96-'06	Elisa
9 March	Handful of Soul	Mario Biondi and the High Five Quintet
16 March	Vicky Love	Biagio Antonacci
23 March	Vicky Love	Biagio Antonacci
30 March	Vicky Love	Biagio Antonacci
6 April	Vicky Love	Biagio Antonacci
13 April	The Best Damn Thing	Avril Lavigne
20 April	The Best Damn Thing	Avril Lavigne
27 April	Call Me Irresponsible	Michael Bublé
4 May	Call Me Irresponsible	Michael Bublé
11 May	Minutes to Midnight	Linkin Park
18 May	Minutes to Midnight	Linkin Park
25 May	Time Out	Max Pezzali
1 June	Papito	Miguel Bosé
8 June	La finestra	Negramaro
15 June	La finestra	Negramaro
22 June	La finestra	Negramaro
29 June	Papito	Miguel Bosé
6 July	Papito	Miguel Bosé
13 July	Papito	Miguel Bosé
20 July	Papito	Miguel Bosé
27 July	Papito	Miguel Bosé
3 August	Papito	Miguel Bosé
10 August	Soundtrack '96-'06	Elisa
17 August	Soundtrack '96-'06	Elisa
24 August	Lifeline	Ben Harper & the Innocent Criminals
31 August	Lifeline	Ben Harper & the Innocent Criminals
7 September	Vicky Love	Biagio Antonacci
14 September	All the Lost Souls	James Blunt
21 September	Todavía	Mina
28 September	Magic	Bruce Springsteen
5 October	Magic	Bruce Springsteen
12 October	Ferro e cartone	Francesco Renga
19 October	Mi faccio in quattro	Gigi D'Alessio
26 October	e²	Eros Ramazzotti
2 November	e²	Eros Ramazzotti
9 November	e²	Eros Ramazzotti
16 November	Primo tempo	Ligabue
23 November	Primo tempo	Ligabue
30 November	Primo tempo	Ligabue
7 December	Primo tempo	Ligabue
14 December	Primo tempo	Ligabue
21 December	Primo tempo	Ligabue
28 December	All the Best	Zucchero

== See also ==
- 2007 in music
- List of number-one hits in Italy
