= La donna, il sogno e il grande incubo =

Studio album by 883
- Released: 16 June 1995
- Label: FRI
- Producers: Claudio Cecchetto; Marco Guarnerio; Pier Paolo Peroni

883 chronology
Remix '94 (1994)	La donna, il sogno e il grande incubo (1995)	La dura legge del gol! (1997)

La donna, il sogno e il grande incubo (Italian for The Woman, the Dream and the Great Nightmare) is the third studio album by Italian pop group 883, released on 16 June 1995 through FRI by Claudio Cecchetto. It was the group's first album following the departure of co-founder Mauro Repetto, although he remained involved as a songwriter and performed on the hidden track "Non sei Bob Dylan".

The album cover, illustrated by cartoonist Giulio De Vita, pays tribute to the Italian comic book character Dylan Dog. The album includes the singles "Senza averti qui", "Tieni il tempo", "Una canzone d'amore" and "Gli anni". It reached number one on the Italian albums chart and sold approximately 600,000 copies in its first year of release.

In 2000, the album was reissued by Warner Music Italy with six additional tracks, including two songs not included on the original release and four remixes. In 2025, it was reissued in a special edition to mark the 30th anniversary of its original release.

== Track listing ==
La donna, il sogno e il grande incubo (1995)
No.	Title	Length
1.	"La radio a 1000 watt"	4:49
2.	"Fattore S"	4:19
3.	"Ti sento vivere"	3:56
4.	"Senza averti qui"	3:47
5.	"Tieni il tempo"	3:35
6.	"Gli avvoltoi"	3:58
7.	"Il grande incubo"	4:57
8.	"Una canzone d'amore"	5:32
9.	"Musica"	3:34
10.	"O me o (quei deficienti lì)"	4:52
11.	"Gli anni"	4:52
12.	"Non sei Bob Dylan" (hidden track)	4:10

La donna, il sogno e il grande incubo – Edizione straordinaria (2000)
No.	Title	Length
13.	"Chiuditi nel cesso"	3:55
14.	"Dimmi perché"	3:51
15.	"Senza averti qui (Kwanzaa Posse Mix)"	3:45
16.	"Il grande incubo (Bliss Team Remix)"	4:33
17.	"Una canzone d'amore (Milangeles Edit)"	4:32
18.	"Gli anni (Bliss Team Classic Remix)"	4:41

== Charts ==
Chart (1995)	Peak position
Italian Albums (FIMI)	1
Italian Albums (Musica e dischi)	1
Swiss Albums (Schweizer Hitparade)	5
Chart (2025)	Peak position
Italian Albums (FIMI)	5

== Certifications ==
Certifications for La donna, il sogno e il grande incubo
Region	Certification	Certified units/sales
Italy (FIMI)	Platinum	50,000^{‡}
^{‡} Sales+streaming figures based on certification alone.
