= Hanno ucciso l'Uomo Ragno (song) =

Single by 883

from the album Hanno ucciso l'Uomo Ragno
- Released: 1992
- Label: FRI
- Songwriters: Max Pezzali; Mauro Repetto
- Producers: Pier Paolo Peroni; Marco Guarnerio; Claudio Cecchetto

883 singles chronology
| "6/1/sfigato" (1992) | "Hanno ucciso l'Uomo Ragno" (1992) | "S'inkazza (Questa casa non è un albergo)" (1992) |

Music video
- "Hanno ucciso l'Uomo Ragno" on YouTube

"Hanno ucciso l'Uomo Ragno" (transl. They Killed Spider-Man) is a song by Italian pop group 883, released in 1992 as a single from their debut studio album of the same name.

The song uses the Marvel Comics superhero Spider-Man as a symbol of lost ideals and the disillusionment of youth, while also reflecting on consumerism and the contradictions of modern society. The track helped establish 883's popularity in Italy, and the group performed it during the 1992 edition of Festivalbar.

In 2012, Max Pezzali re-recorded the song with Dargen D'Amico for Hanno ucciso l'Uomo Ragno 2012.

== Track listing ==
Hanno ucciso l'Uomo Ragno (Remix)
| No. | Title | Length |
|---|---|---|
| 1. | "Hanno ucciso l'Uomo Ragno" (Fargetta remix) | 5:10 |
| 2. | "Hanno ucciso l'Uomo Ragno" (Album version) | 4:10 |
| 3. | "Hanno ucciso l'Uomo Ragno" (Pierpa remix) | 5:30 |
| 4. | "Hanno ucciso l'Uomo Ragno" (Drumappella) | 3:15 |

== Charts ==
| Chart (1992) | Peak position |
|---|---|
| Italy (Musica e dischi) | 1 |
| Chart (2026) | Peak position |
| Italy (FIMI) | 71 |

== Certifications ==
Certifications for "Hanno ucciso l'Uomo Ragno"
| Region | Certification | Certified units/sales |
|---|---|---|
| Italy (FIMI) | 2× Platinum | 200,000^{‡} |
^{‡} Sales+streaming figures based on certification alone.
