= Time Out (Max Pezzali album) =

2007 studio album by Max Pezzali

Studio album by Max Pezzali
- Released: 25 May 2007
- Language: Italian
- Label: Warner
- Producers: Pier Paolo Peroni; Claudio Cecchetto

Max Pezzali chronology
Tutto Max (2005)	Time Out (2007)	Max Live 2008 (2008)

Time Out is the second solo studio album by Italian singer-songwriter Max Pezzali, released on 25 May 2007 by Warner. The album was preceded by the single "Torno subito", released to radio on 4 May 2007, and followed by "Sei fantastica", released in September. Time Out debuted at number one on the Italian albums chart and received a platinum certification.

== Background and release ==
In an interview for Rockol, Pezzali discussed the album's emphasis on travel, exploration and the cultural influence of the United States. The cover features a portrait of the singer incorporated into a road map.

The album was produced by Pier Paolo Peroni and Claudio Cecchetto, with arrangements by Michele Canova and contributions from other musicians, including Eros Ramazzotti, who played guitar on "Sei fantastica", and Tiziano Ferro, who provided backing vocals on the title track.

== Track listing ==
No.	Title	Length
1.	"Torno subito"	4:06
2.	"Time Out"	3:44
3.	"Profumo"	4:15
4.	"Il presente"	4:09
5.	"Esserci"	4:16
6.	"Il meglio"	4:15
7.	"I filosofi"	3:47
8.	"Sei fantastica"	3:21
9.	"Sottosopra"	3:26
10.	"La strada"	3:47
11.	"Chiuso in una scatola"	2:58

Digital edition
No.	Title	Length
12.	"La metro eccetera" (featuring Stylophonic)	3:51
13.	"La televisione che felicità" (featuring Edoardo Bennato)	4:05

== Charts ==
=== Weekly charts ===
Chart (2007)	Peak position
Italian Albums (FIMI)	1

=== Year-end charts ===
Chart (2007)	Position
Italian Albums (FIMI)	34
