= Con un deca =

Single by 883

from the album Hanno ucciso l'Uomo Ragno
- Released: 1992
- Label: FRI
- Songwriters: Max Pezzali; Mauro Repetto
- Producers: Pier Paolo Peroni; Marco Guarnerio; Claudio Cecchetto

883 singles chronology
"S'inkazza (Questa casa non è un albergo)" (1992)	"Con un deca" (1992)	"Jolly Blue" (1992)

"Con un deca" is a song by Italian pop group 883, released in 1992 as a single from their debut studio album, Hanno ucciso l'Uomo Ragno.

The song's title refers to a ten-thousand-lire banknote, known colloquially as a "deca" in Northern-Italian youth slang at the time. Its lyrics depict two young friends who feel dissatisfied with their ordinary lives and discuss their desire to do something meaningful, while lamenting that their limited financial means leave them with few options for entertainment or travel. The city referenced in the song is Pavia, the hometown of group members Max Pezzali and Mauro Repetto.

A re-recorded version featuring Italian hip-hop group Club Dogo appeared on the remake album Hanno ucciso l'Uomo Ragno 2012.

In 2024, "Con un deca" was used as the opening theme of the television series Accidentally Famous, which tells the story of the group.

== Track listing ==
Con un deca (Remix)
No.	Title	Length
1.	"Con un deca" (Fargetta mix)	6:13
2.	"Con un deca" (Chorus mix by Pierpa)	6:05
3.	"Lasciati toccare" (Extended mix)	5:08
4.	"Te la tiri" (Album version)	3:34
5.	"Con un deca" (Kick version)	4:56

== Charts ==
Chart (2024–2026)	Peak position
Italy (FIMI)	44

== Certifications ==
Certifications for "Con un deca"
Region	Certification	Certified units/sales
Italy (FIMI)	Platinum	100,000^{‡}
^{‡} Sales+streaming figures based on certification alone.
