= Edoardo Ferrario =

Italian actor and comedian (born 1987)

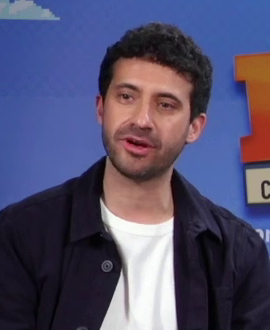
- Ferrario in 2024
- Born: 11 May 1987 (age 39); Rome, Italy
- Occupations: Actor, comedian
- Years active: 2012–present

Edoardo Ferrario (born 11 May 1987) is an Italian actor and comedian.

== Life and career ==
Born in Rome in 1987, Ferrario attended Mamiani Classical High School and graduated in law from Roma Tre University with a thesis in criminal law. He is the older brother of rapper Mostro. In 2012, he joined the main cast of Un due tre stella on La7, invited by Sabina Guzzanti. In 2013, he debuted as Filippo "Pips" De Angelis in MTV's La prova dell'otto and launched his first stand-up comedy show, Temi caldi.

In 2014, he created Esami - La serie, a YouTube series that gained millions of views and won awards at the Taormina Film Fest and Roma Web Fest. In 2015, he won the International Award for Political Satire in Forte dei Marmi. Over the following years, he developed the sequel Post-Esami, continued his radio and television career, and joined the cast of Quelli che il calcio on Rai 2. In 2019, he became the first Italian stand-up comedian with a Netflix special, Temi caldi, and later released new shows, including Diamoci un tono on RaiPlay.

In 2020, Ferrario published his first book, Siete persone cattive, by Mondadori, and hosted the series Paese reale on RaiPlay. From 2020 to 2023, he co-hosted the podcast Cachemire. Since 2023, he has been part of the cast of Gialappa Show, where he portrays Maicol Pirozzi, an economic guru.

Frmom 2024 to 2026, Ferrario portrayed music producer Pier Paolo Peroni in the 883's biopic series Accidentally Famous.

== Filmography ==
Film
Year	Title	Role	Notes
2026	Un tranquillo funerale di famiglia	Marco	Feature film debut

Television
Year	Title	Role	Notes
2014	Esami: La serie	Various	Web series (also director and writer)
2016	Post Esami	Various	Web series (also director and writer)
2023	Sono Lillo	Himself	TV series; episode 2
2024	No Activity: Italy	Bartolo Gasparin	TV series; 3 episodes
2024–2026	Accidentally Famous	Pier Paolo Peroni	TV series; 10 episodes
2025	Sconfort Zone	Edoardo	TV series; main role
2025	Il Baracchino	Leonardo Da Vinci	TV series; main role; voice role

== Television programs ==
- Un due tre stella! (La7, 2012)
- La prova dell'otto (MTV, 2013)
- NeriPoppins (Rai 3, 2013)
- Aggratis! (Rai 2, 2013)
- Stand up Comedy (Comedy Central, 2015–2017)
- CCN - Comedy Central News (Comedy Central, dal 2015)
- Quelli che il calcio (Rai 2, 2016–2019)
- Be Happy (Rai 3, 2018)
- Il posto giusto (Rai 3, 2019)
- Stati generali (Rai 3, 2019)
- Concerto del Primo Maggio (Rai 3, 2020)
- Paese reale (RaiPlay, 2020)
- Prova prova sa sa (Prime Video, 2022–2023)
- Gialappa Show (Sky Uno, 2023–present)
- LOL - Chi ride è fuori (Prime Video, 2024)
- Broncio (Rai Radio 2, 2024)
- In & Out (Sky Uno, 2025)
- RIP: Roast in Peace (Prime Video, 2025)

== Works ==
- Edoardo Ferrario (2020). Siete persone cattive. Storie comiche di mostri italiani. Milan: Mondadori.
