= List of number-one hits of 1986 (Italy) =

This is a list of number-one songs in 1986 on the Italian charts compiled weekly by the Italian Hit Parade Singles Chart.

== Chart history ==
Issue date	Song	Artist(s)	Ref.
January 4	"Election Day"	Arcadia	
January 11	"Take On Me"	A-ha	
January 18	"Take On Me"	A-ha	
January 25	"Take On Me"	A-ha	
February 1	"Take On Me"	A-ha	
February 8	"Diamond"	Via Verdi	
February 15	"Ti sento"	Matia Bazar	
February 22	"Adesso Tu"	Eros Ramazzotti	
March 1	"Adesso Tu"	Eros Ramazzotti	
March 8	"Adesso Tu"	Eros Ramazzotti	
March 15	"Adesso Tu"	Eros Ramazzotti	
March 22	"Adesso Tu"	Eros Ramazzotti	
March 29	"Adesso Tu"	Eros Ramazzotti	
April 5	"Adesso Tu"	Eros Ramazzotti	
April 12	"You Can Leave Your Hat On"	Joe Cocker	
April 19	"You Can Leave Your Hat On"	Joe Cocker	
April 26	"You Can Leave Your Hat On"	Joe Cocker	
May 3	"You Can Leave Your Hat On"	Joe Cocker	
May 10	"You Can Leave Your Hat On"	Joe Cocker	
May 17	"Live To Tell"	Madonna	
May 24	"Live To Tell"	Madonna	
May 31	"Live To Tell"	Madonna	
June 7	"Live To Tell"	Madonna	
June 14	"Live To Tell"	Madonna	
June 21	"Live To Tell"	Madonna	
June 28	"Live To Tell"	Madonna	
July 5	"Run to Me"	Tracy Spencer	
July 12	"Papa Don't Preach"	Madonna	
July 19	"Papa Don't Preach"	Madonna	
July 26	"Papa Don't Preach"	Madonna	
August 2	"Papa Don't Preach"	Madonna	
August 9	"Papa Don't Preach"	Madonna	
August 16	"Papa Don't Preach"	Madonna	
August 23	"Papa Don't Preach"	Madonna	
August 30	"Easy Lady"	Spagna	
September 6	"Easy Lady"	Spagna	
September 13	"Easy Lady"	Spagna	
September 20	"Easy Lady"	Spagna	
September 27	"Easy Lady"	Spagna	
October 4	"Easy Lady"	Spagna	
October 11	"Easy Lady"	Spagna	
October 18	"Easy Lady"	Spagna	
October 25	"Holiday Rap"	MC Miker G & DJ Sven	
November 1	"Holiday Rap"	MC Miker G & DJ Sven	
November 8	"Holiday Rap"	MC Miker G & DJ Sven	
November 15	"Notorious"	Duran Duran	
November 22	"Notorious"	Duran Duran	
November 29	"Notorious"	Duran Duran	
December 6	"Notorious"	Duran Duran	
December 13	"The Final Countdown"	Europe	
December 20	"The Final Countdown"	Europe	
December 27	"The Final Countdown"	Europe	

== Number-one artists ==
Position	Artist	Weeks #1
1	Madonna	14
2	Spagna	8
3	Eros Ramazzotti	7
4	Joe Cocker	5
5	A-ha	4
5	Duran Duran	4
6	Europe	3
6	MC Miker G & DJ Sven	3
7	Arcadia	1
7	Matia Bazar	1
7	Tracy Spencer	1
7	Via Verdi	1
