= Grazie mille =

1999 studio album by 883

Studio album by 883
- Released: 23 October 1999
- Label: S4, Marton Corporation
- Producers: Claudio Cecchetto; Marco Guarnerio; Pier Paolo Peroni

883 chronology
Gli anni (1998)	Grazie mille (1999)	Mille grazie (2000)

Grazie mille is the fifth studio album by Italian pop group 883, released on 23 October 1999 through S4 and Marton Corporation. It includes the singles "Viaggio al centro del mondo", "Grazie mille", "Nient'altro che noi" and "La regina del Celebrità".

The album sold approximately 500,000 copies in its first year of release. It peaked at number two on the Italian albums chart and ranked 21st among the country's best-selling albums of 1999.

== Track listing ==
Grazie mille (1999)
No.	Title	Length
1.	"Grazie mille"	4:03
2.	"La regina del Celebrità"	3:53
3.	"Le luci di Natale"	4:41
4.	"Almeno una volta"	3:40
5.	"Nient'altro che noi"	4:33
6.	"Viaggio al centro del mondo" (Mosso remix)	3:35
7.	"Tenendomi"	3:28
8.	"Dopo il solito bip"	4:51
9.	"La rana e lo scorpione"	5:30
10.	"Tutto ciò che ho"	4:32

Grazie mille: Edizione straordinaria (2002)
No.	Title	Length
11.	"Grazie mille" (Benvenuto 2000 remix)	3:56
12.	"La regina del Celebrità" (Eiffel 65 remix)	4:17
13.	"Viaggio al centro del mondo" (Jeo's remix)	3:50

== Charts ==
=== Weekly charts ===
Weekly chart performance for Grazie mille
Chart (1999–2000)	Peak position
Italian Albums (FIMI)	2
Swiss Albums (Schweizer Hitparade)	35
Austrian Albums (Ö3 Austria)	14

=== Year-end charts ===
Year-end chart performance for Grazie mille
Chart (1999)	Position
Italian Albums (FIMI)	21
Chart (2000)	Position
Italian Albums (FIMI)	29

== Certifications ==
Certifications for Grazie mille
Region	Certification	Certified units/sales
Italy (FIMI)	Gold	25,000^{‡}
^{‡} Sales+streaming figures based on certification alone.
