= Uno in più =

Studio album by 883
- Released: 21 June 2001
- Label: Warner
- Producers: Pier Paolo Peroni; Carlo Ubaldo Rossi; Alberto Tafuri

883 chronology
Mille grazie (2000)	Uno in più (2001)	Love/Life (2002)

Uno in più (stylized as 1 in +) is the sixth and final studio album by Italian pop group 883, released on 21 June 2001 by Warner. It features guest appearances by Jovanotti on "Cloro", Syria and Alex Britti on "Essere in te", and J-Ax of Articolo 31 on "Noi parte 2". Notable singles include "Bella vera", "La lunga estate caldissima" and "Come deve andare".

The album reached number one on the Italian albums chart and sold over 300,000 copies in Italy.

== Track listing ==
No.	Title	Length
1.	"Punto e a capo"	4:18
2.	"Bella vera (non è il caldo ma)"	3:34
3.	"Essere in te" (featuring Syria)	4:20
4.	"Cloro" (featuring Jovanotti)	3:29
5.	"Come deve andare"	4:35
6.	"La lunga estate caldissima"	3:44
7.	"Noi parte 2" (featuring J-Ax)	5:21
8.	"Honolulu Baby"	4:33
9.	"So che tu sai"	3:47
10.	"Uno in più"	4:41

== Charts ==
=== Weekly charts ===
Weekly chart performance for Uno in più
Chart (2001)	Peak position
Italian Albums (FIMI)	1
Swiss Albums (Schweizer Hitparade)	32

=== Year-end charts ===
Year-end chart performance for Uno in più
Chart (2001)	Position
Italian Albums (FIMI)	18
