= La regola dell'amico =

1997 single by Italian group 883

Single by 883

from the album La dura legge del gol!
- Released: 1997
- Label: FRI
- Songwriter: Max Pezzali
- Producers: Pier Paolo Peroni; Marco Guarnerio; Claudio Cecchetto

883 singles chronology
"Un giorno così" (1997)	"La regola dell'amico" (1997)	"Nessun rimpianto" (1997)

Music video
- "La regola dell'amico" on YouTube

"La regola dell'amico" (transl. The Friend Rule) is a song by Italian pop group 883, released in 1997 as a single from their fourth studio album, La dura legge del gol!. Written by Max Pezzali, the song deals with the idea that friendship can become an obstacle to a romantic relationship when one person develops feelings that are not reciprocated. It has been described as an ironic take on the friend zone.

Pezzali later joked that his marriage to Debora Pelamatti, a longtime friend before they became romantically involved, had disproved the premise of the song.

== Track listing ==
No.	Title	Length
1.	"La regola dell'amico" (Silver Mix)	5:42
2.	"La regola dell'amico" (Album version)	4:03
3.	"La regola dell'amico" (Devotional Mix)	5:51
4.	"La regola dell'amico" (Original Dance Mix)	4:03
5.	"La regola dell'amico" (Dance Authority Mix)	5:47
6.	"La regola dell'amico" (883 Orchestra)	4:03
7.	"La regola dell'amico" (Funky Dub Connection)	5:59

== Charts ==
Chart (1997)	Peak position
Italy (Musica e dischi)	15

== Certifications ==
Certifications for "La regola dell'amico"
Region	Certification	Certified units/sales
Italy (FIMI)	Gold	50,000^{‡}
^{‡} Sales+streaming figures based on certification alone.
