= That's Life (2018 film) =

2018 Italian romantic comedy film

- Theatrical release poster
- Directed by: Francesca Mazzoleni
- Screenplay by: Francesca Mazzoleni; Paola Mammini; Pietro Seghetti
- Based on: Succede by Sofia Viscardi
- Produced by: Marica Gungui
- Starring: Margherita Morchio
- Cinematography: Valerio Azzali
- Edited by: Ilaria Fraioli
- Music by: Lorenzo Tomio
- Production companies: Warner Bros. Entertainment Italia; Indigo Film; Roman Citizen
- Distributed by: Warner Bros. Pictures
- Release date: 5 April 2018
- Running time: 94 minutes
- Country: Italy
- Language: Italian
- Box office: $546,697

That's Life (Italian: Succede) is a 2018 Italian romantic comedy film directed by Francesca Mazzoleni, based on the novel Succede by Sofia Viscardi.

== Cast ==
- Margherita Morchio as Margherita detta Meg
- Matilde Passera as Olimpia detta Olly
- Matteo Oscar Giuggioli as Tommaso detto Tom
- Brando Pacitto as Samuele detto Sam
- Francesca Inaudi as Ginevra
- Giampiero Judica as Luca
- Giovanni Anzaldo as Max
- Mathilde Ilariucci as Stefania
- Lorenzo Pedol as Christian
