= Couch Potatoes (film) =

- Film poster
- Italian: Gli sdraiati
- Directed by: Francesca Archibugi
- Written by: Michele Serra (story); Francesca Archibugi; Francesco Piccolo
- Starring: Claudio Bisio
- Cinematography: Kika Ungaro
- Edited by: Esmeralda Calabria
- Music by: Battista Lena
- Release date: 23 November 2017
- Running time: 99 minutes
- Country: Italy
- Language: Italian

Couch Potatoes (Italian: Gli sdraiati) is a 2017 Italian comedy-drama film directed by Francesca Archibugi.

== Cast ==
- Claudio Bisio as Giorgio Selva
- Gaddo Bacchini as Tito Selva
- Ilaria Brusadelli as Alice Bendidio
- Cochi Ponzoni as Pinin Innocenti
- Antonia Truppo as Rosalba Bendidio
- Matteo Oscar Giuggioli as Lombo
- Gigio Alberti as Gianni
- Barbara Ronchi as Annalisa
- Federica Fracassi as Carla
- Donatella Finocchiaro as President Barenghi
- Sandra Ceccarelli as Livia Innocenti
- Carla Chiarelli as Elena
- Giancarlo Dettori as the psychoanalyst
