= Elia Nuzzolo =

Italian actor (born 2000)

- Born: 4 July 2000 (age 26); Prato, Tuscany, Italy
- Education: Centro Sperimentale di Cinematografia
- Occupation: Actor
- Years active: 2022–present

Elia Nuzzolo (born 4 July 2000) is an Italian actor, best known for portraying Max Pezzali in the television series Accidentally Famous (2024–26) and a young Mike Bongiorno in the miniseries Mike (2024).

== Filmography ==
Film
Year	Title	Role	Notes
2023	Wreckage	Nino	Short film
2023	Rossosperanza	Tommaso	Film debut
2026	Il dio dell'amore	Lorenzo	

Television
Year	Title	Role	Notes
2024–2026	Accidentally Famous	Max Pezzali	Main role
2024	Mike	Young Mike Bongiorno	Main role
2025	Call My Agent - Italia	Himself	Episode 3x02
