= Hanno ucciso l'Uomo Ragno =

Studio album by 883
- Released: 10 February 1992
- Label: FRI
- Producers: Claudio Cecchetto; Marco Guarnerio; Pier Paolo Peroni

883 chronology
Hanno ucciso l'Uomo Ragno (1992)	Nord sud ovest est (1993)

Hanno ucciso l'Uomo Ragno (transl. They Killed Spider-Man) is the debut studio album by Italian pop group 883, released on 10 February 1992 through FRI by Claudio Cecchetto. It includes the singles "Non me la menare", "Hanno ucciso l'Uomo Ragno" and "Con un deca", and reached the top of the Italian albums chart. In 2000, the album was reissued by Warner Music, featuring six additional tracks.

In 2012, on the twentieth anniversary of the album, Max Pezzali released Hanno ucciso l'Uomo Ragno 2012, a reworking of the original record featuring collaborations with Italian rappers, including Dargen D'Amico, Emis Killa, Club Dogo, Fedez and Baby K.

The making of the album was fictionalized in the first season of the television series Accidentally Famous (2024), which depicts the early years of 883 and the origins of some of their songs.

== Track listing ==
Hanno ucciso l'Uomo Ragno (1992)
No.	Title	Length
1.	"Non me la menare"	4:14
2.	"S'inkazza (Questa casa non è un albergo)"	3:34
3.	"6/1/sfigato"	3:58
4.	"Te la tiri"	3:34
5.	"Hanno ucciso l'Uomo Ragno"	4:12
6.	"Con un deca"	4:57
7.	"Jolly Blue"	3:30
8.	"Lasciati toccare"	4:48
9.	"Non me la menare (Gospel)"	2:30

Hanno ucciso l'Uomo Ragno: Edizione straordinaria (2000)
No.	Title	Length
10.	"Il problema (demo)"	3:44
11.	"Lasciala stare (demo)"	4:51
12.	"S'inkazza (Questa casa non è un albergo) (Pierpa & Didde remix)"	3:51
13.	"Hanno ucciso l'Uomo Ragno (Fargetta remix)"	5:02
14.	"Con un deca (Fargetta remix)"	6:13
15.	"Non me la menare (Shout remix)"	4:40

== Charts ==
Chart (1992)	Peak position
Italy (Musica e dischi)	1
Chart (2024)	Peak position
Italian Albums (FIMI)	6

== Certifications ==
Certifications for Hanno ucciso l'Uomo Ragno
Region	Certification	Certified units/sales
Italy (FIMI)	Platinum	50,000^{‡}
^{‡} Sales+streaming figures based on certification alone.

== Hanno ucciso l'Uomo Ragno 2012 ==
Hanno ucciso l'Uomo Ragno 2012

Remix album by Max Pezzali / 883
- Released: 12 June 2012
- Label: Warner
- Producers: Claudio Cecchetto; Marco Guarnerio; Pier Paolo Peroni

Max Pezzali chronology
Terraferma (2011)	Hanno ucciso l'Uomo Ragno 2012 (2012)	Max 20 (2013)

883 chronology
Tutto Max (2005)	Hanno ucciso l'Uomo Ragno 2012 (2012)	Collection: 883 (2013)

Hanno ucciso l'Uomo Ragno 2012 is a remix album by Max Pezzali, released on 12 June 2012 by Warner to mark the twentieth anniversary of the original record. It features updated arrangements of the original songs with guest appearances by Italian hip-hop artists, including J-Ax, Ensi, Emis Killa, Dargen D'Amico, Club Dogo, Fedez and Baby K. It also includes the original song "Sempre noi".

The album was a commercial success in Italy and topped the Italian albums chart.

=== Track listing ===
No.	Title	Length
1.	"Sempre noi" (featuring J-Ax)	4:43
2.	"Non me la menare (2012)" (featuring Entics)	4:31
3.	"S'inkazza (2012)" (featuring Ensi)	3:59
4.	"6/1 sfigato (2012)" (featuring Two Fingerz)	4:21
5.	"Te la tiri (2012)" (featuring Emis Killa)	4:18
6.	"Hanno ucciso l'Uomo Ragno (2012)" (featuring Dargen D'Amico)	4:53
7.	"Con un deca (2012)" (featuring Club Dogo)	4:46
8.	"Jolly Blue (2012)" (featuring Fedez)	4:03
9.	"Lasciati toccare (2012)" (featuring Baby K)	4:19
Total length:		39:43

=== Charts ===
Weekly chart performance for Hanno ucciso l'Uomo Ragno 2012
Chart (2012)	Peak position
Italian Albums (FIMI)	1

Year-end chart performance for Hanno ucciso l'Uomo Ragno 2012
Chart (2012)	Position
Italian Albums (FIMI)	52

=== Certifications ===
Certifications for Hanno ucciso l'Uomo Ragno 2012
Region	Certification	Certified units/sales
Italy (FIMI)	Gold	30,000^{*}
^{‡} Sales+streaming figures based on certification alone.
