= Via Verdi =

Italo disco group

Via Verdi are an Italian Italo disco musical group formed in 1983. Their most commercially successful song "Diamond" was a number one hit on the Italian hit parade in 1986. Other hits included "Sometimes" and "You and Me", which respectively reached numbers sixteen and twenty-five on the Italian charts.

After disbanding at the end of the 1980s, the surviving members of Via Verdi reformed in the 2000s.

== Members ==
=== Current lineup ===
- Marco Grati – guitars
- Glauco Medori – keyboards
- Remo Zito – vocals
- Simone Medori – drums, percussion

=== Former members ===
- Patrizio Giuliante – author and arrangements
- Maurizio Varano – drums
- Massimo Marchione – drums
- Mauro Pedini – drums
- Marco Fabbri – drums
- Mauro Saracini – drums
- Primiano Pavani – drums
- Armando Grati – bass
- Aurelio Scalabroni – vocals
- Luca Mancinelli – vocals

== Discography ==
=== Albums ===
- Trailer (1987)
- The Time Machine (2020)

=== Singles ===
- "Diamond" (1985) – Italy No. 1
- "Sometimes" (1986) – Italy No. 16
- "You and Me" (1987) – Italy No. 25
- "Love Is a Dream" (1989)
- "Diamond (Thirty-Fifth Dawn)" (2020)
- "Shades of Red" (2022)
