= Alessia Merz =

Italian model and television host (born 1974)

- Born: 24 September 1974 (age 52); Trento, Italy
- Occupations: Model, television host, actress, showgirl
- Years active: 1992–present
- Spouse: Fabio Bazzani (m. 2005)
- Children: 2

Alessia Merz (born 24 September 1974) is an Italian model, television host and showgirl. Merz was born in Trento.

== Career ==
She debuted in 1992 in the Canale 5 show Bulli e pupe. In September she appeared in Non è la Rai's second edition, where she remained until 1995. After this experience, she took part to the Canale 5 show Striscia la notizia, where she acted as a dancer within Cristina Quaranta until 1996.

In 1995, she appeared in Ragazzi della notte and debuted as a television host in the first edition of Meteore, on Italia 1. In the late 1990s, she appeared in Gli inaffidabili, Mamma per caso, Jolly Blu, Vacanze sulla neve and L'ispettore Giusti.

Later that year she cohosted on Sanremo famosi. In 1999 she appeared in calendars for magazines Boss and Maxim.

In 2000, she presented the second edition of Meteore and appeared on the candid camera show Candid Angels the b-movie Intrigo a Cuba.

After that, she participated at the show Quelli che il calcio and, in 2004, she presented the show Festival: Gruppo d'ascolto, on air on RaiSat Extra and Rai Utile. In 2004 she entered in the second edition's cast of the Italian version of Celebrity Survivor, named L'isola dei famosi.

== Filmography ==
- Ragazzi della notte (1995)
- Gli inaffidabili (1997)
- Panarea (1997)
- Mamma per caso (1997)
- Jolly Blu (1998)
- Cornetti al miele (1999)
- Vacanze sulla neve (1999)
- Il commissario Montalbano (one episode: La voce del violino) (1999)
- Un medico in famiglia (1999)
- L'ispettore Giusti (1999)
- Intrigo a Cuba (2000)
- Turbo (2000)
- Il Bacio di Dracula (2002)
