= Matteo Oscar Giuggioli =

Italian actor (born 2000)

- Giuggioli in 2026
- Born: 31 December 2000 (age 25); Rho, Lombardy, Italy
- Occupation: Actor
- Years active: 2017–present

Matteo Oscar Giuggioli (born 31 December 2000) is an Italian actor, best known for his role in the film Under the Riccione Sun (2020) and for portraying Mauro Repetto in the television series Accidentally Famous (2024–26). In 2025, he received the David di Donatello Italian Rising Stars award.

== Filmography ==
Film
Year	Title	Role	Notes
2017	Couch Potatoes	Lombo	Film debut
2018	That's Life	Tom	
2020	Under the Riccione Sun	Tommy	
2022	The Invisible Thread	Dario Del Monte	
2022	My Soul Summer	Lip	
2023	Billy	Billy	
2023	Volare	Michele	
2023	Suspicious Minds		

Television
Year	Title	Role	Notes
2019	Un passo dal cielo	Klaus Moser	TV series (11 episodes)
2020	Vivi e lascia vivere	Luca	TV series (12 episodes)
2021–2023	Buongiorno, mamma!	Jacopo Borghi	TV series (24 episodes)
2022	Vostro onore	Matteo Pagani	Miniseries (8 episodes)
2024–2026	Accidentally Famous	Mauro Repetto	TV series (main role)
2025	Call My Agent - Italia	Himself	TV series (episode 3x02)
