= Sei un mito =

- CD cover art

Single by 883

from the album Nord sud ovest est
- Released: 1993
- Label: FRI
- Songwriters: Max Pezzali; Mauro Repetto
- Producers: Pier Paolo Peroni; Marco Guarnerio; Claudio Cecchetto

883 singles chronology
"Jolly Blue" (1992)	"Sei un mito" (1993)	"Nord sud ovest est" (1993)

Music video
- "Sei un mito" on YouTube

"Sei un mito" (transl. You Are a Legend) is a song by Italian pop group 883, released in 1993 as a single from their second studio album, Nord sud ovest est. The song was performed by the group at the 1993 editions of Cantagiro and Festivalbar, and reached number one on the Italian singles chart. Its music video features Canadian supermodel Yasmeen Ghauri.

A remix by Stefano Secchi was included on the compilation Remix '94. A version performed by Fiorello and Max Pezzali was later included on the compilation Max 20.

== Track listing ==
=== CD single ===
No.	Title	Length
1.	"Sei un mito" (Album version)	5:06
2.	"S'inkazza" (Pierpa & Didde remix)	4:30
3.	"Aeroplano" (featuring Caterina)	4:25
4.	"Con un deca" (Fargetta remix)	5:26
5.	"Sei un mito" (Grunge version)	5:40
6.	"Sei un mito" (Disco version)	6:54

=== 12-inch maxi-single ===
Side A

No.	Title	Length
1.	"Sei un mito" (Disco version)	6:54
2.	"Sei un mito" (Album version)	5:06

Side B

No.	Title	Length
1.	"Sei un mito" (Grunge version)	5:40
2.	"Aeroplano" (featuring Caterina)	4:25

== Charts ==
Chart (1993)	Peak position
Austria (Ö3 Austria Top 40)	21
Italy (Musica e dischi)	1
Switzerland (Schweizer Hitparade)	32

== Certifications ==
Certifications for "Sei un mito"
Region	Certification	Certified units/sales
Italy (FIMI)	Platinum	100,000^{‡}
^{‡} Sales+streaming figures based on certification alone.
