= Tracy Spencer =

- Birth name: Louise Tracy Freeman
- Born: 5 January 1962 (age 63); Halifax, West Yorkshire, England
- Origin: London, UK
- Genres: Italo disco
- Occupation: Singer
- Instrument: Vocals
- Years active: 1985–1988
- Labels: CBS, Ibiza Records

Tracy Freeman (born 5 January 1962), better known as Tracy Spencer, is a British Italo disco singer and actress, discovered by the Italian record producer and talent scout Claudio Cecchetto. Born in Halifax, West Yorkshire, she is best known for the song "Run to Me", which won the 1986 Festivalbar and was No. 1 on the Italian hit parade.

== Discography ==
=== Album ===
- 1987 - Tracy - ITA #14

=== Singles ===
- 1986 - "Run to Me" - ITA #1
- 1986 - "Love Is Like a Game" - ITA #8
- 1987 - "Take Me Back" - ITA #8
- 1988 - "Two to Tango Too" / "I Feel for You" - ITA #15
