= Tieni il tempo =

1995 song by Italian group 883

- Maxi-single cover art

Single by 883

from the album La donna, il sogno e il grande incubo
- Released: 1995
- Label: FRI
- Songwriter: Max Pezzali
- Producers: Pier Paolo Peroni; Marco Guarnerio; Claudio Cecchetto

883 singles chronology
"Senza averti qui" (1995)	"Tieni il tempo" (1995)	"Una canzone d'amore" (1995)

Music video
- "Tieni il tempo" on YouTube

"Tieni il tempo" is a song by Italian pop group 883, released in 1995 as the second single from their third studio album, La donna, il sogno e il grande incubo. The song won the 1995 edition of the Italian summer music festival Festivalbar, with the final held in Ascoli Piceno on 5 September 1995.

The song was later included on several compilation albums by the group and by Max Pezzali. A new version featuring Jovanotti was included on Pezzali's 2013 compilation album Max 20. A version with rapper Moreno was also used as the theme song for the Italian comedy show Colorado in 2013.

A Spanish-language cover, titled "Mi novia formal", was recorded by Mexican pop group Kairo in 1997.

== Track listing ==
=== 12-inch maxi-single ===
Side A

No.	Title	Length
1.	"Tieni il tempo"	3:35
2.	"Tieni il tempo" (124 BPM Remix)	3:43

Side B

No.	Title	Length
1.	"Il grande incubo"	4:57
2.	"Fattore S" (124 BPM Remix)	4:19

=== 2001 reissue ===
No.	Title	Length
1.	"Tieni il tempo" (Latino Mix)	3:35
2.	"Tieni il tempo" (Jeo's Remix)	3:41
3.	"La regola dell'amico"	4:04

== Charts ==
Chart (1995)	Peak position
Italy (Musica e dischi)	22

== Certifications ==
Certifications for "Tieni il tempo"
Region	Certification	Certified units/sales
Italy (FIMI)	Gold	35,000^{‡}
^{‡} Sales+streaming figures based on certification alone.
