= Nord sud ovest est =

Studio album by 883
- Released: 21 May 1993
- Label: FRI
- Producers: Claudio Cecchetto; Marco Guarnerio; Pier Paolo Peroni

883 chronology
| Hanno ucciso l'Uomo Ragno (1992) | Nord sud ovest est (1993) | Remix '94 (1994) |

Nord sud ovest est (transl. North South West East) is the second studio album by Italian pop group 883, released on 21 May 1993 through FRI by Claudio Cecchetto. It includes the singles "Sei un mito", "Nord sud ovest est", "Come mai" and "Rotta per casa di Dio", and became the best-selling album in Italy in 1993, spending 14 consecutive weeks at the top of the Italian albums chart. In 2000, the album was reissued by Warner Music, featuring six additional tracks.

Rolling Stone Italia ranked it tenth on its list of the 10 best Italian albums of the 1990s.

The making of the album was fictionalized in the second season of the television series Accidentally Famous (2026), which depicts the early years of 883.

== Track listing ==
Nord sud ovest est (1993)
| No. | Title | Length |
|---|---|---|
| 1. | "Il pappagallo" | 3:36 |
| 2. | "Sei un mito" | 5:06 |
| 3. | "Non ci spezziamo" | 3:05 |
| 4. | "Come mai" | 4:15 |
| 5. | "Rotta per casa di Dio" | 4:52 |
| 6. | "Nord sud ovest est" | 4:30 |
| 7. | "Ma perché" | 3:24 |
| 8. | "Weekend" | 3:47 |
| 9. | "Cumuli" | 4:59 |
| 10. | "Nella notte" | 4:22 |

Nord sud ovest est: Edizione straordinaria (2000)
| No. | Title | Length |
|---|---|---|
| 11. | "Aeroplano" (featuring Caterina Rappoccio) | 4:25 |
| 12. | "L'ultimo bicchiere (demo)" | 3:19 |
| 13. | "Sei un mito (Stefano Secchi remix)" | 3:46 |
| 14. | "Come mai (Bliss Team remix)" | 6:07 |
| 15. | "Nord sud ovest est (Datura Sonora remix)" | 5:34 |
| 16. | "Nella notte (Molella remix)" | 5:09 |

== Charts ==
| Chart (1993) | Peak position |
|---|---|
| Italy (Musica e dischi) | 1 |
| Swiss Albums (Schweizer Hitparade) | 17 |
| Chart (2023) | Peak position |
| Italian Albums (FIMI) | 18 |

== Certifications ==
Certifications for Nord sud ovest est
| Region | Certification | Certified units/sales |
|---|---|---|
| Italy (FIMI) | Platinum | 50,000^{‡} |
^{‡} Sales+streaming figures based on certification alone.
