= Baby K =

American medical controversy

- Born: Stephanie Keene; October 13, 1992; Falls Church, Virginia
- Died: April 5, 1995 (aged 2); Falls Church, Virginia
- Known for: Legal ramifications with life and being anencephalic

Stephanie Keene (October 13, 1992 – April 5, 1995), better known by the pseudonym Baby K, was an anencephalic baby who became the center of a major American court case and a debate among bioethicists.

== History ==
=== Prenatal assessment ===
Stephanie Keene was born at Fairfax Hospital in Falls Church, Virginia, a hospital in the Washington metropolitan area. At the time of her birth, she was missing most of her brain, including the cortex; only the brainstem, the portion of the brain responsible for autonomic and regulatory functions, such as the control of respiration, the heartbeat and blood pressure, had developed.

=== Opposing viewpoints ===
Keene's mother had been notified of her condition following ultrasonography, and was advised to terminate the pregnancy by her obstetrician and neonatologist but chose to carry the child to term because of "a firm Christian faith that all life should be protected". The hospital believed that care provided to the baby would be futile, while the mother believed mechanical breathing support must be provided during the baby's periodic respiratory crises. Fairfax Hospital doctors strongly advised a "do not resuscitate" order for the child, which the mother refused. Stephanie remained on ventilator support for six weeks while Fairfax searched for another hospital to transfer her to, but no other hospital would accept her. After the baby was weaned off constant ventilator support, the mother agreed to move the child to a nursing facility, but the baby returned to the hospital many times for respiratory problems.

=== Legal proceedings ===
When baby Keene was admitted to the hospital at six months of age for severe respiratory problems, the hospital filed a legal motion to appoint a guardian for the child's care and sought a court order that the hospital did not need to provide any services beyond palliative care. At trial, several experts testified that providing ventilator support to an anencephalic infant went beyond the accepted standard of medical care. In contrast, the baby's mother argued her case on the grounds of religious freedom and the sanctity of life. In a controversial ruling, the United States District Court for the Eastern District of Virginia decided that the hospital caring for Keene must put her on a mechanical ventilator whenever she had trouble breathing. The court interpreted the Emergency Medical Treatment and Active Labor Act (EMTALA) to require continued ventilation for the infant. The wording of this act requires that patients who present with a medical emergency must get "such treatment as may be required to stabilize the medical condition" before the patient is transferred to another facility. The court refused to take a moral or ethical position on the issue, insisting that it was only interpreting the laws as they existed. As a result of the decision, Keene was kept on the ventilator much longer than most anencephalic babies. It has been suggested by the dissenting judge in the case that the court should have used the condition anencephaly as the basis of the case, not the recurring subsidiary symptoms of respiratory distress. As the irreversibility of anencephaly is widely understood in the medical community, he argued that the decision to continue futile care only resulted in the repetitive diversion of medical equipment.

Keene's cardiac death occurred on April 5, 1995, at Fairfax Hospital, at age of 2 years 174 days.

== Significance ==
The case of Baby K is of particular importance to the field of bioethics because of the issues it raises: the definition of death, the nature of personhood, the concept of futile medical care, and many issues relating to the allocation of scarce resources. Some commentators, including Arthur Kohrman and Jacob Appel, have argued that the ruling effectively undermined the right of physicians to make sound medical decisions.

== See also ==
- Baby Doe Law
