= Come mai =

- CD single cover art

Single by 883

from the album Nord sud ovest est
- Released: 1993
- Label: FRI
- Songwriters: Max Pezzali; Mauro Repetto
- Producers: Pier Paolo Peroni; Marco Guarnerio; Claudio Cecchetto

883 singles chronology
| "Nord sud ovest est" (1993) | "Come mai" (1993) | "Ma perché" (1993) |

Music video
- "Come mai" on YouTube

"Come mai" (transl. How Come?) is a song by Italian pop group 883, released in 1993 as a single from their second studio album, Nord sud ovest est. Written by Max Pezzali and Mauro Repetto, the song is a pop ballad about the intense emotions and uncertainty associated with falling in love. Pezzali had initially considered offering the song to Massimo Ranieri for the Sanremo Music Festival 1993, while producer Claudio Cecchetto encouraged its inclusion on Nord sud ovest est.

The song ranked in the top ten of the best-selling hits of 1993 and became one of the group's best-known releases. A version featuring Italian television presenter and singer Fiorello was also released.

The song was subsequently included on several compilations by 883 and Pezzali. In 1994, a remix by Bliss Team was included on the compilation Remix '94 and was used as the opening theme of the Festivalbar that year.

== Track listing ==
=== CD single / 12-inch maxi-single ===
| No. | Title | Length |
|---|---|---|
| 1. | "Come mai" (Radio version) | 4:15 |
| 2. | "Come mai" (Video version) (featuring Fiorello) | 4:15 |
| 3. | "Come mai" (Karaoke version) | 4:15 |
| 4. | "883 – 100 BPM Megamix" (Medley) | 6:28 |
| 5. | "883 – 120 BPM Megamix" (Medley) | 7:31 |

=== 1994 remix maxi-single ===
Side A

| No. | Title | Length |
|---|---|---|
| 1. | "Come mai" (Bliss Team / Eiffel 65 remix) | 6:30 |
| 2. | "Come mai" (Prezioso remix) | 5:12 |

Side B

| No. | Title | Length |
|---|---|---|
| 1. | "Come mai" (Barraca Destroy remix) | 5:05 |
| 2. | "Come mai" (A cappella) | 3:30 |

== Charts ==
| Chart (1993) | Peak position |
|---|---|
| Italy (Musica e dischi) | 2 |
| Chart (2025–2026) | Peak position |
| Italy (FIMI) | 25 |

== Certifications ==
Certifications for "Come mai"
| Region | Certification | Certified units/sales |
|---|---|---|
| Italy (FIMI) | 2× Platinum | 200,000^{‡} |
^{‡} Sales+streaming figures based on certification alone.
