= Nord sud ovest est (song) =

Single by 883

from the album Nord sud ovest est
- Released: 1993
- Label: FRI
- Songwriters: Max Pezzali; Mauro Repetto
- Producers: Pier Paolo Peroni; Marco Guarnerio; Claudio Cecchetto

883 singles chronology
"Sei un mito" (1993)	"Nord sud ovest est" (1993)	"Come mai" (1993)

Music video
- "Nord sud ovest est" on YouTube

"Nord sud ovest est" (transl. North South West East) is a song by Italian pop group 883, released in 1993 as a single from their second studio album, Nord sud ovest est.

The lyrics describe a journey undertaken by a man in search of a lost love, while questioning whether he is actually searching for the woman or for himself. The song's Western-inspired atmosphere and its theme of travel have been interpreted as a metaphor for the search for personal identity and meaning in life.

A Spanish-language cover with different lyrics, titled "En los espejos de un café", was recorded by Mexican pop group Kairo in 1994.

== Track listing ==
Nord sud ovest est (CD-Maxi)
No.	Title	Length
1.	"Nord sud ovest est" (Album mix)	4:30
2.	"Nord sud ovest est" (N.S.O. extended, dance remix)	5:31
3.	"Nord sud ovest est" (Piano mix)	4:30
4.	"Bonus Tracks" (Five vocal sampling tests)	0:22

== Charts ==
Chart (1993)	Peak position
Italy (Musica e dischi)	4
Chart (2024–2026)	Peak position
Italy (FIMI)	68

== Certifications ==
Certifications for "Nord sud ovest est"
Region	Certification	Certified units/sales
Italy (FIMI)	Platinum	100,000^{‡}
^{‡} Sales+streaming figures based on certification alone.
