= Mauro Repetto =

Italian songwriter and former member of 883

Background information
- Born: Mauro Antonio Repetto; 26 December 1968 (age 57); Genoa, Italy
- Occupations: Songwriter; composer; performer
- Years active: 1988–present

Mauro Repetto (born 26 December 1968) is an Italian songwriter, composer and performer, best known as a co-founder of the pop duo 883, alongside Max Pezzali. He co-wrote the duo's early albums Hanno ucciso l'Uomo Ragno and Nord sud ovest est, before leaving the group in 1994.

== Life and career ==
Repetto was born in Genoa in 1968 and grew up in Pavia, Lombardy, where he attended the Niccolò Copernico scientific high school. He met Max Pezzali in his third year of high school, and the two became close friends through their shared interest in music, beginning writing songs together.

The pair initially performed as I Pop and recorded demo tapes before attracting the attention of music producer Claudio Cecchetto. They adopted the name 883 and made their breakthrough with the song "Non me la menare" in 1991. Their 1992 debut album, Hanno ucciso l'Uomo Ragno, established them as one of Italy's most successful pop acts. Repetto co-wrote the duo's songs, while Pezzali generally handled the lead vocals and Repetto became known for his energetic dancing on stage. In 1993, 883 released their second studio album, Nord sud ovest est, which achieved even greater commercial success than their debut, winning the Festivalbar award.

In 1994, at the height of the duo's success, Repetto left 883 to pursue his ambition of working in the United States. He moved to Miami and later explored opportunities in New York and Hollywood, including plans to produce a film and record an album. These projects did not lead to the career he had hoped for, and he eventually returned to Europe. He released his solo album ZuccheroFilatoNero in 1995, but it was a commercial failure, selling approximately 23,000 copies. In 1999, he began working at Disneyland Paris, initially as a cowboy performer before moving into event management, spending years largely away from the Italian music scene.

Repetto and Pezzali gradually re-established contact after years apart. In 2011, they met again at Disneyland Paris, and Pezzali invited him to appear in the music video for the 2012 single "Sempre noi". They subsequently collaborated on Pezzali's album Max 20 (2013), co-writing songs and appearing together on stage. Repetto later joined Pezzali on stage at concerts in 2022 and 2025, performing "Nord sud ovest est". In 2024, he embarked on the theatrical tour Alla ricerca dell'Uomo Ragno – La favola degli 883, an autobiographical musical show.

== In fiction ==
Repetto's early life and career were fictionalized in the television series Accidentally Famous (2024–2026), in which he is portrayed by Matteo Oscar Giuggioli.
