= Carlo Ubaldo Rossi =

Italian composer and music producer

- Born: 17 August 1958; Munich, Bavaria, West Germany
- Died: 11 March 2015 (aged 56) Moncalieri, Piedmont, Italy
- Genre: Pop
- Occupations: Composer; musician; music producer
- Years active: 1983–2015

Carlo Ubaldo Rossi (17 August 1958 – 11 March 2015) was an Italian composer and music producer. He died in a motorcycle accident in the hills of Moncalieri, near Turin.
