= 883 (band) =

Italian pop rock group

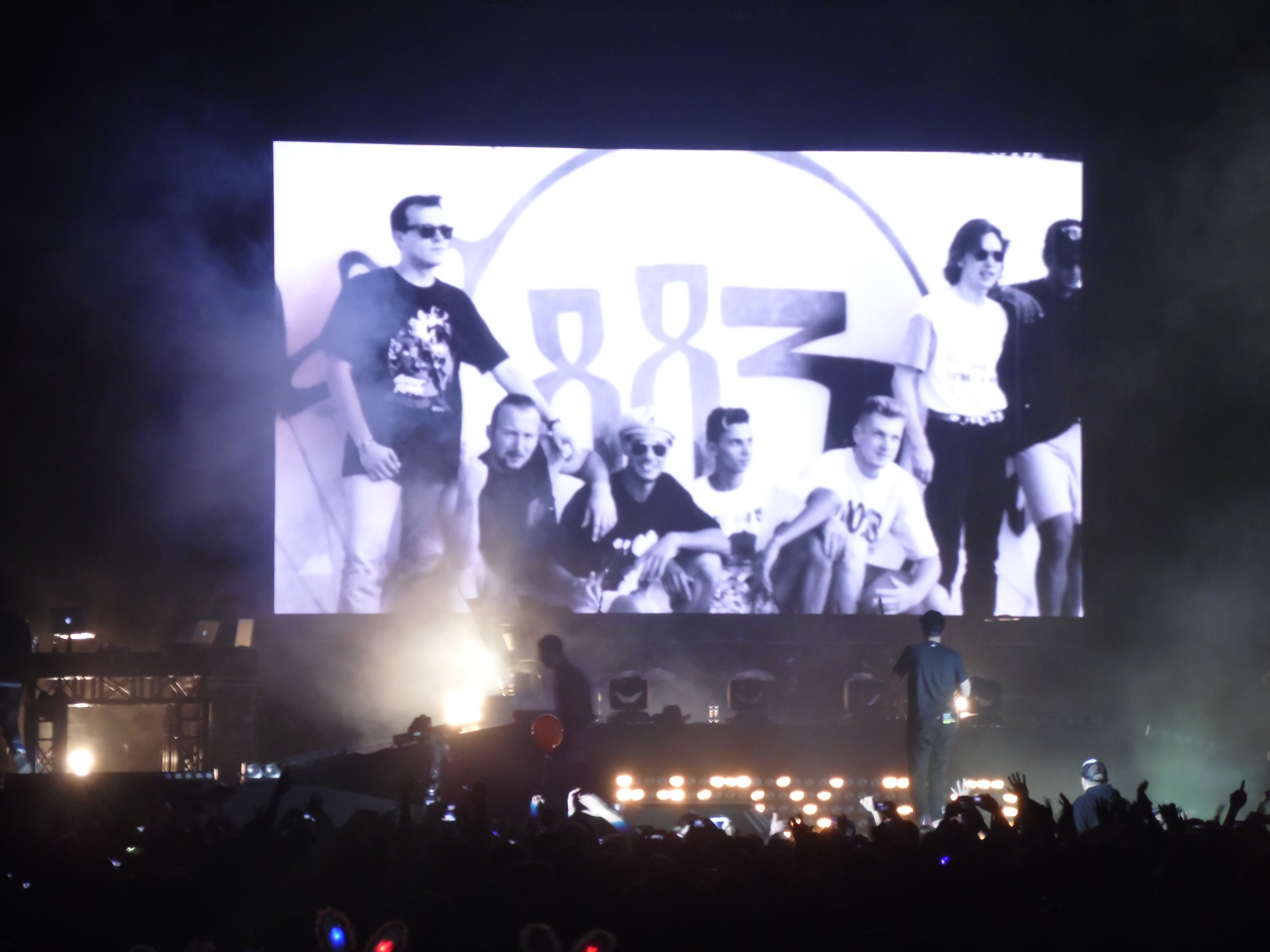
- An 883 photo projected during a Max Pezzali concert in 2013

Background information
- Origin: Pavia, Italy
- Genre: Pop
- Years active: 1988–2003
- Label: Fri
- Past members: Max Pezzali; Mauro Repetto

883 (pronounced otto otto tre) was an Italian pop group active from 1988 to 2003.

== History ==
883 were formed by singers Max Pezzali and Mauro Repetto after their roles on the 1988 television series 1,2,3, Jovanotti (at that time, the name of the band was 'I Pop'). Being big fans of motorbikes, especially Harley-Davidsons, they decided to name the group 883 after the 883cc Harley-Davidson Sportster. They recorded some demos and forwarded them to Claudio Cecchetto, a DJ and producer who had worked on 1, 2, 3, Jovanotti. The group released their debut single "Non me la menare" which became a smash hit in Italy. Their first album, Hanno ucciso l'Uomo Ragno ("They killed Spider-Man"), hit number 1 on the Italian charts. Their second album, Nord sud ovest est, produced the number 1 singles "Sei un mito" and "Come mai". Upon the release of their third album, Repetto left the group. Pezzali recruited new members and continued the band name. "Un giorno così", from the 1997 album La dura legge del gol!, also went to number 1 in Italy. In 1998, the group released a film about themselves, titled Jolly Blu. A greatest hits collection was issued in 1998 as Gli anni. After Grazie mille (1999) and Uno in più (2001), Pezzali himself went solo in 2003.

They sold over 10 million albums and won Festivalbar (one of the most important musical competition in the country) a total of three times: in 1993 (best album), in 1995 (best song) and finally in 2005 (best album).

== Members ==
Founders

- Max Pezzali – lead vocals (1988–2003)
- Mauro Repetto – additional vocals (1988–1994)

Additional musicians

- Roberto Drovandi – bass (1995–1996)
- Leandro Misuriello – bass (1995–1996)
- Roberto Melone – bass (1997–1999)
- Matteo Bassi – bass (1999–2002)
- Ivan Ciccarelli – drums (1995–1998)
- Eugenio Mori – drums (1998–2000)
- Emiliano Bassi – drums (2001–2002)
- Jacopo Corso – guitar (1995–1996)
- Piero Cazzago – guitar (1997–1998)
- Fabrizio Frigeni – guitar (1999–2000)
- Daniele Gregolin – guitar (2001–2002)
- Roberto Priori – guitar (1995–1999)
- Matteo Salvadori – guitar (1998–2002)
- Massimiliano Pelan – guitar (2002–2003)
- Sandro Verde – keyboards (1995–1996)
- Alberto Tafuri – keyboards (1997–2002)
- Stefano Cecere – keyboards, programming (1997–1998)
- Daniele Moretto – keyboards, backing vocals (1995–2000)
- Michele Monestiroli – saxophone, guitar, backing vocals (1995–2000)
- Gabriel Nuzzoli – percussion (1997–1999)
- Claudio Borrelli – percussion (1999–2000)
- Chiara Iezzi – guitar, backing vocals (1995)
- Paola Iezzi – guitar, backing vocals (1995)

== Discography ==
=== Studio albums ===
List of albums with chart positions
Title	Year	Peak chart positions				
Title	Year	ITA FIMI	ITA MD	AUT	EU	SWI
Hanno ucciso l'Uomo Ragno	1992	6	1	–	–	–
Nord sud ovest est	1993	18	1	–	–	17
La donna, il sogno e il grande incubo	1995	1	1	–	23	5
La dura legge del gol!	1997	1	2	–	18	12
Grazie mille	1999	2	4	14	–	35
Uno in più	2001	1	2	–	–	32

=== Compilation albums ===
List of compilation albums with chart positions
Title	Year	Peak chart positions		
Title	Year	ITA FIMI	ITA MD	SWI
Remix '94	1994	–	2	–
Gli anni	1998	1	1	22
Mille grazie	2000	–	–	24
Love/Life (Note: Credited to Max Pezzali & 883)	2002	6	8	–
Tutto Max	2005	1	1	63
Hanno ucciso l'Uomo Ragno 2012	2012	1	–	–
Collection: 883	2013	23	–	–
Le canzoni alla radio	2017	3	–	–

=== Singles ===
List of albums with chart positions
Title	Year	Peak chart positions				Album
Title	Year	ITA FIMI	ITA MD	AUT	SWI	Album
"Non me le menare"	1992	–	–	–	–	Hanno ucciso l'Uomo Ragno
"Sei uno sfigato"	1992	–	–	–	–	Hanno ucciso l'Uomo Ragno
"Hanno ucciso l'Uomo Ragno"	1992	71	1	–	–	Hanno ucciso l'Uomo Ragno
"S'inkazza (Questa casa non è un albergo)"	1992	–	–	–	–	Hanno ucciso l'Uomo Ragno
"Con un deca"	1992	44	–	–	–	Hanno ucciso l'Uomo Ragno
"Jolly Blue"	1992	–	–	–	–	Hanno ucciso l'Uomo Ragno
"Sei un mito"	1993	–	1	21	32	Nord sud ovest est
"Nord sud ovest est"	1993	68	4	–	–	Nord sud ovest est
"Come mai"	1993	25	2	–	–	Nord sud ovest est
"Rotta per casa di Dio"	1993	–	9	–	–	Nord sud ovest est
"Ma perché"	1993	–	10	–	–	Nord sud ovest est
"Nella notte"	1993	–	9	–	–	Nord sud ovest est
"Chiuditi nel cesso"	1994	–	2	–	–	Remix '94
"Senza averti qui"	1995	–	–	–	–	La donna, il sogno e il grande incubo
"Tieni il tempo"	1995	–	22	–	–	La donna, il sogno e il grande incubo
"Una canzone d'amore"	1995	–	–	–	–	La donna, il sogno e il grande incubo
"Il grande incubo"	1995	–	–	–	–	La donna, il sogno e il grande incubo
"Ti sento vivere"	1995	–	–	–	–	La donna, il sogno e il grande incubo
"Gli anni"	1996	–	20	–	–	La donna, il sogno e il grande incubo
"Un giorno così"	1997	1	12	–	–	La dura legge del gol!
"La regola dell'amico"	1997	–	15	–	–	La dura legge del gol!
"Nessun rimpianto"	1997	–	–	–	–	La dura legge del gol!
"La dura legge del gol"	1997	–	–	–	–	La dura legge del gol!
"Se tornerai"	1997	–	–	–	–	La dura legge del gol!
"Finalmente tu"	1997	–	–	–	–	La dura legge del gol!
"Io ci sarò"	1998	–	–	–	–	Gli anni
"Viaggio al centro del mondo"	1999	5	12	–	–	Grazie mille
"Grazie mille"	1999	–	–	–	–	Grazie mille
"Nient'altro che noi"	2000	–	–	–	–	Grazie mille
"La regina del Celebrità"	2000	–	–	–	–	Grazie mille
"Bella vera"	2001	6	8	–	–	Uno in più
"La lunga estate caldissima"	2001	19	19	–	–	Uno in più
"Come deve andare"	2001	37	37	–	–	Uno in più
"Uno in più"	2001	–	–	–	–	Uno in più
"Ci sono anch'io"	2002	7	6	–	–	Love/Life
"Quello che capita"	2002	–	–	–	–	Love/Life
