= Max Pezzali =

Italian singer-songwriter

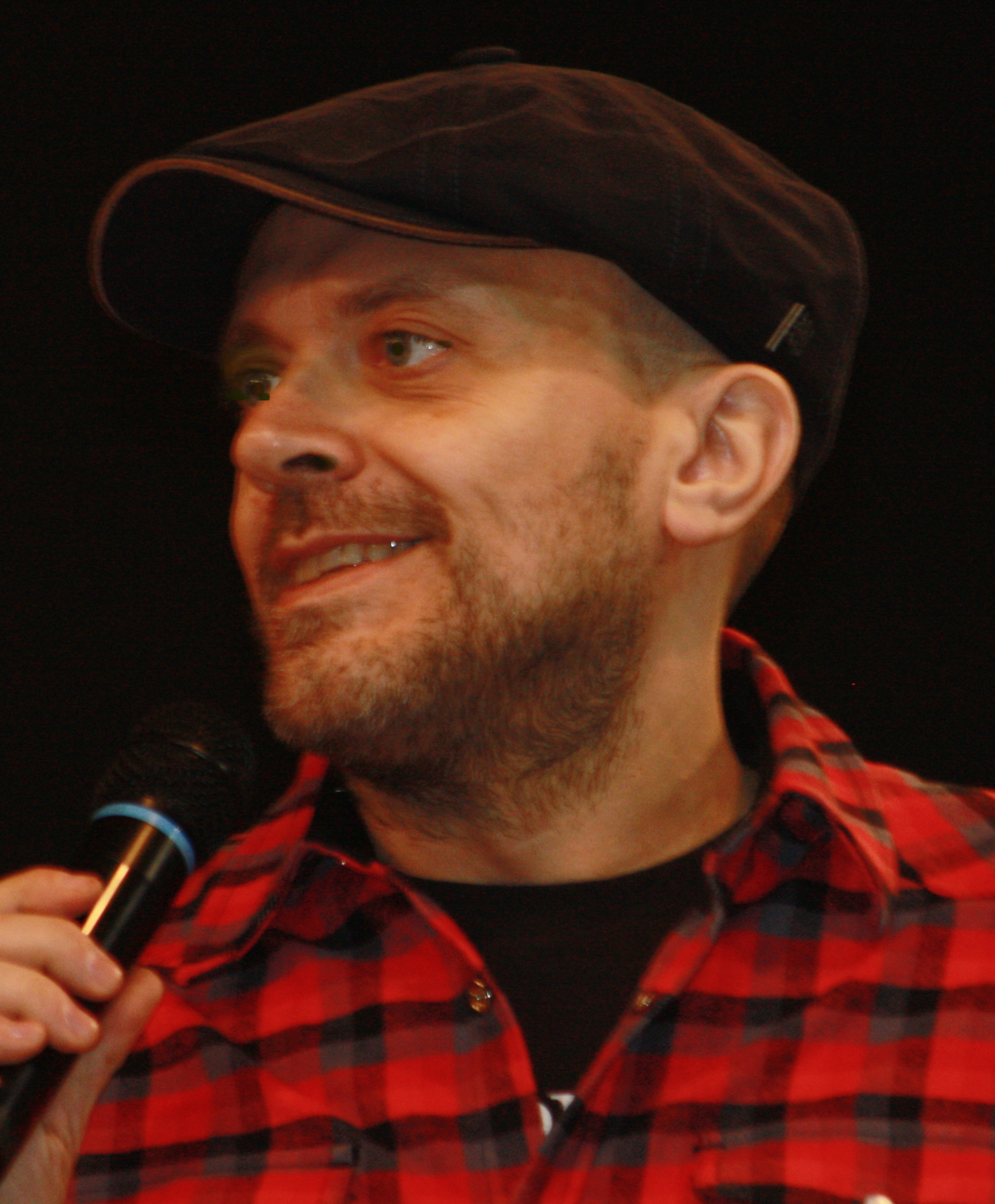
- Pezzali at Cartoomics in 2013

Background information
- Born: Massimo Pezzali; 14 November 1967 (age 58); Pavia, Lombardy, Italy
- Occupations: Singer; songwriter
- Instrument: Vocals
- Years active: 1988–present
- Labels: FRI (1991–2000); Warner (2000–present)
- Formerly of: 883
- Website: www.maxpezzali.it

Massimo "Max" Pezzali (born 14 November 1967) is an Italian singer-songwriter best known as the lead vocalist and principal songwriter of the pop rock group 883. Following the group's disbandment, he began a solo career with the album Il mondo insieme a te (2004). His releases include several commercially successful albums, and his whole career has reportedly sold more than 10 million records in total.

== Early life ==
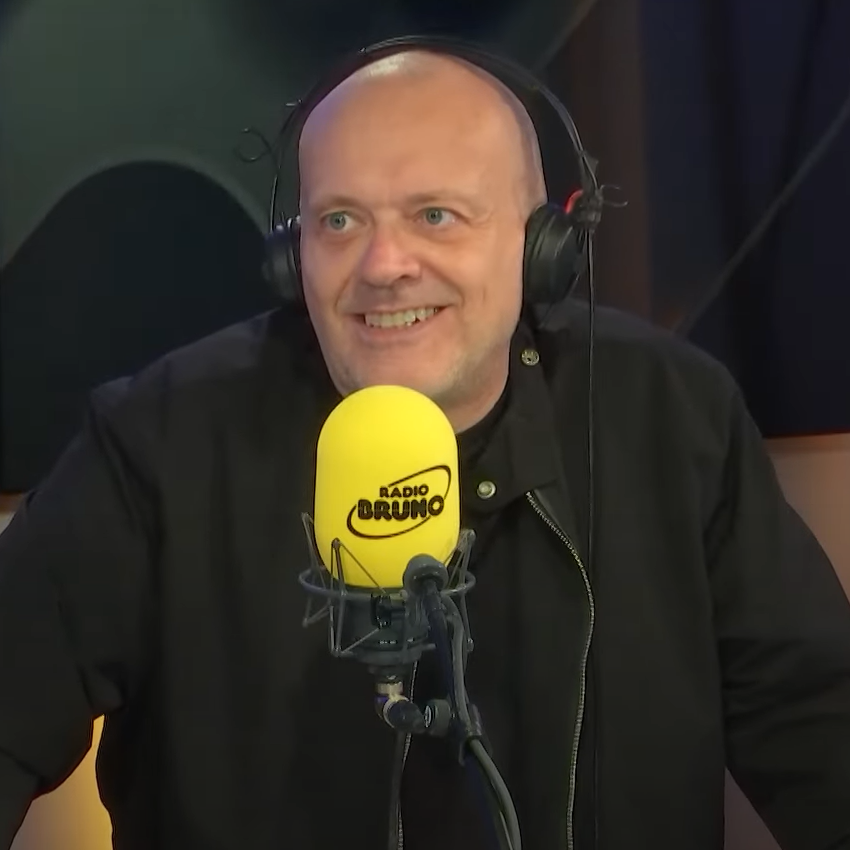
Pezzali in 2024

Pezzali was born on 14 November 1967 in Pavia, Lombardy, Italy. His parents owned a florist shop.

After failing a year at the Taramelli high school in 1984, Pezzali was made by his parents to work in the family shop, where his duties included flower deliveries for funerals. He was subsequently transferred to the Copernico Institute, where he met Mauro Repetto. Sharing an interest in rock and roll and punk music, the two decided to pursue music together. Pezzali also performed civilian service as an ambulance volunteer with the Italian Red Cross in Pavia, completing his service in 1991.

== Career ==
=== 883 ===
Pezzali and Repetto began writing songs together while attending high school. Initially performing under the name I Pop, they made their television debut in 1988 on 1, 2, 3 Jovanotti, a programme hosted by Jovanotti, with the English-language rap song "Live in the Music". The experience brought them into contact with music producer Claudio Cecchetto, to whom they later submitted a demo tape. With Cecchetto's support, the duo adopted the name 883, inspired by the engine displacement of a Harley-Davidson Sportster. They subsequently shifted to writing songs in Italian and made their recording debut with "Non me la menare", which they performed at the Castrocaro Music Festival in 1991.

The duo achieved widespread success with their debut album, Hanno ucciso l'Uomo Ragno (1992), which topped the Italian albums chart. Their follow-up, Nord sud ovest est (1993), further established their popularity, producing the hit singles "Sei un mito" and "Come mai". That year, Pezzali and Rosario Fiorello won the Festival Italiano performing with "Come mai".

In 1994, Repetto left 883 to pursue a career in the film industry in the United States. His departure marked the end of the duo's original lineup, although Pezzali continued under the group's name forming a band. The split was attributed to Repetto's desire to pursue different artistic ambitions, and the two lost contact. 883's third album, La donna, il sogno e il grande incubo, was released in 1995 and became a commercial success. That year, the group also competed at the Sanremo Music Festival with "Senza averti qui". Pezzali continued the group's success with La dura legge del gol! (1997), the compilation Gli anni (1998), Grazie mille (1999), Mille grazie (2000), released in German-speaking markets, and Uno in più (2001). In 1998, Pezzali also starred in Jolly Blu, a musical comedy film inspired by 883's music, which marked his only acting role and was poorly received by critics and audiences.

In 2002, Pezzali began preparing for a solo career, and the 883 project came to an end. The compilation Love/Life was released that year, bringing together songs from the group's later period.

=== Solo ===
In 2003, Pezzali began working on his first solo album, Il mondo insieme a te, which was released in May 2004. The album topped the Italian albums chart and sold more than 200,000 copies in Italy. In 2005, he released a greatest hits compilation, Tutto Max, credited to Pezzali/883, accompanied by a DVD featuring his music videos. His second solo studio album, Time Out, followed in 2007 and achieved commercial success in Italy.

In 2008, Pezzali released Max Live 2008, a live album featuring recordings of his performances alongside two previously unreleased songs, "Mezzo pieno o mezzo vuoto" and "Ritornerò". That year, he embarked on the Max Live Tour, performing in more than 25 Italian cities. After the tour, Pezzali reduced his musical activities to spend more time with his family following the birth of his son. During this period, he continued to make occasional television appearances and collaborate with other artists, including an appearance on the Italian version of X Factor in 2009.

After a four-year gap between studio albums, Pezzali returned in 2011 with Terraferma, released on 16 February. The album was preceded by the single "Il mio secondo tempo", with which he competed at the Sanremo Music Festival 2011, marking his return to the festival after 16 years. He subsequently embarked on the Terraferma Tour to promote the album. The next year, Pezzali released Hanno ucciso l'Uomo Ragno 2012, a rap reworking of 883's 1992 debut album, to mark its 20th anniversary. The album featured collaborations with several prominent Italian rappers, including J-Ax, Club Dogo, Fedez, Emis Killa and Baby K. In 2013, Pezzali released Max 20, a compilation featuring 14 songs from his work with 883 and his solo career, re-recorded as duets with various Italian artists, alongside five original tracks. The album also marked Pezzali's reunion with former 883 co-founder Repetto, who authored two of the new songs.

His next studio album, Astronave Max, was released in June 2015, preceded by the single "È venerdì".. In 2017, he released the single "Le canzoni alla radio", featuring Nile Rodgers. The song was included on his compilation album of the same name, which featured songs from his career with 883 and as a solo artist, as well as seven previously unreleased tracks. In 2018, Pezzali embarked on a joint tour with Nek and Francesco Renga, followed by the release of Max Nek Renga – Il disco, a live album featuring performances by all three artists.

In 2020, Pezzali released Qualcosa di nuovo, his fifth solo studio album. Its release had been postponed from April to October because of the COVID-19 pandemic. In 2024, Pezzali released Max Forever: Vol. 1, a compilation of songs from his career, featuring collaborations with artists including J-Ax, Cesare Cremonini and Riccardo Zanotti. A second volume, Max Forever: Vol. 2, was released on 30 October 2026.

== Personal life ==
Pezzali is currently living in Pavia, for some years he lived in Rome where he used to live with Martina Marinucci, his ex-wife. Max and Martina were married on 2 April 2005. After 13 years together, they officially separated in 2014. They have a son, Hilo, born in 2008. A few months after his separation, he became engaged to Debora Pelamatti. Pezzali is a big fan of motorbikes, especially of Harley-Davidson models (his group was named after the 883cc Harley-Davidson Sportster), and since 2000, he has been a partner of an authorized Harley-Davidson dealership in Pavia. He is a great fan of comics and his favorites are the superhero comics published by Marvel and the Italian comic book series Rat-Man created by Leo Ortolani. In fact, he has a collection of over 1300 comics. He is also a great fan of Bruce Springsteen, who represented an important source of inspiration for his music career. Pezzali is also a supporter of Inter Milan and has even dedicated a song to his football team, entitled "Sei Fantastica".

== Discography ==
=== Studio albums ===
List of studio albums, with chart positions and certifications
Title	Details	Peak chart positions		Certifications
Title	Details	ITA	SWI	Certifications
Il mondo insieme a te	Released: 28 May 2004; Label: Warner, FRI	1	81	FIMI: 2× Platinum
Time Out	Released: 25 May 2007; Label: Warner	1	—	FIMI: Platinum
Terraferma	Released: 16 February 2011; Label: Warner	4	88	
Astronave Max	Released: 1 June 2015; Label: Warner	2	49	FIMI: Gold
Qualcosa di nuovo	Released: 30 October 2020; Label: Warner	3	—	FIMI: Gold

=== Compilation albums ===
List of compilation albums, with chart positions and certifications
Title	Details	Peak chart positions		Certifications
Title	Details	ITA	SWI	Certifications
Tutto Max (Note: Credited as Max Pezzali/883.)	Released: 10 June 2005; Label: Warner	1	63	FIMI: 3× Platinum
Hanno ucciso l'Uomo Ragno 2012	Released: 12 June 2012; Label: Warner	1	—	FIMI: Gold
Max 20	Released: 4 June 2013; Label: Warner	1	57	FIMI: 2× Platinum
Le canzoni alla radio	Released: 17 November 2017; Label: Warner	3	—	FIMI: Platinum
Max Forever: Vol. 1	Released: 13 December 2024; Label: Warner	11	—	
Max Forever: Vol. 2	Released: 30 October 2026; Label: Warner	3	—	

=== Live albums ===
List of live albums, with chart positions and certifications
Title	Details	Peak chart positions		Certifications
Title	Details	ITA	SWI	Certifications
Max Live 2008	Released: 23 May 2008; Label: Warner	5	—	FIMI: Platinum
Max Nek Renga – Il disco (with Nek and Francesco Renga)	Released: 9 March 2018; Label: Warner	3	—	FIMI: Gold

=== 883 ===
- Hanno ucciso l'Uomo Ragno (1992)
- Nord sud ovest est (1993)
- La donna, il sogno e il grande incubo (1995)
- La dura legge del gol! (1997)
- Gli anni (1998)
- Grazie mille (1999)
- Uno in più (2001)
- Love/Life (2002)

== Other works ==
- In 1998, Pezzali dedicated much of his time to writing a book, which explained in detail the inspiration and details of his lyrics. It was titled Stessa storia, stesso posto, stesso bar. During the same year, he starred in the film Jolly Blu along with his old band-mates; the film featured many of 883's biggest hits, while the story-line was centered around the lyrics of selected songs from the band's repertoire.
- In 2002, he wrote the lyrics and performed the Italian-language version of "I'm Still Here (Jim's Theme)" for the Disney animated film Treasure Planet.
- On 8 April 2008, he released his first novel, Per prendersi una vita.
- In 2013, he released an autobiographical novel, I cowboy non mollano mai.
- He dubbed the Italian take on Jack Taggert in the movie Iron Man 3.

== In fiction ==
Pezzali is portrayed by Elia Nuzzolo in the 883's biopic series Accidentally Famous (2024–2026).

== Awards and nominations ==
Year	Ceremony	Category	Work	Result
2013	MTV Europe Music Awards	Best Italian Act	Himself	Nominated
