= Festivalbar =

1964–2007 Italian song popularity contest

- Genre: Pop
- Location: Italy
- Years active: 1964–2007
- Founders: Vittorio Salvetti
- Website: festivalbar.it

The Festivalbar (Italian: Il Festivalbar) was an Italian singing competition that took place in the most important Italian squares during summer, such as the Piazza del Duomo, Catania or Piazza Bra, Verona. The first edition took place in 1964 and was broadcast by RAI. The competition was held throughout the summer and the final round always took place at the Arena in Verona after 3-4 events in various cities of Italy.

== History ==
Originally, the Festivalbar was a competition made with data from jukeboxes in Italian bars, so the competition was a one evening event transmitted by RAI.

From 1983, Mediaset started to transmit this programme and the Festivalbar would change its location every week.

The original promoter of the Festivalbar was Vittorio Salvetti. After his death in 1998, his son Andrea took the reins.

== Winning songs ==
- 1964: Bobby Solo - "Credi a me"
- 1965: Petula Clark - "Ciao ciao"
- 1966: Caterina Caselli - "Perdono"
- 1967: Rocky Roberts - "Stasera mi butto"
- 1968: Adamo - "Affida una lacrima al vento"
- 1969: Lucio Battisti - "Acqua azzurra, acqua chiara"
- 1970: Lucio Battisti - "Fiori rosa fiori di pesco"
- 1971: Demis Roussos - "We Shall Dance"
- 1972: Mia Martini - "Piccolo uomo"
- 1973: Marcella Bella - "Io domani"; Mia Martini - "Minuetto"
- 1974: Claudio Baglioni - "E tu"
- 1975: Drupi - "Due"; Gloria Gaynor - "Reach Out I'll Be There"
- 1976: Gianni Bella - "Non si può morire dentro"
- 1977: Umberto Tozzi - "Ti amo"
- 1978: Alunni del Sole - "Liù"; Kate Bush - "Wuthering Heights"
- 1979: Alan Sorrenti - "Tu sei l'unica donna per me"
- 1980: Miguel Bosè - "Olympic Games"
- 1981: Donatella Rettore - "Donatella"
- 1982: Miguel Bosè - "Bravi ragazzi"; Loredana Bertè - "Non sono una signora"; Ron - "Anima"
- 1983: Vasco Rossi - "Bollicine"
- 1984: Gianna Nannini - "Fotoromanza"
- 1985: Righeira - "L'estate sta finendo"
- 1986: Tracy Spencer - "Run to Me"
- 1987: Spagna - "Dance Dance Dance"
- 1988: Scialpi e Scarlett - "Pregherei"
- 1989: Raf - "Ti pretendo"
- 1990: Francesco Baccini & Ladri di Biciclette - "Sotto questo sole"
- 1991: Gino Paoli - "Quattro amici"
- 1992: Luca Carboni - "Mare mare"
- 1993: Raf - "Il battito animale"
- 1994: Umberto Tozzi - "Io muoio di te"
- 1995: 883 - "Tieni il tempo"
- 1996: Eros Ramazzotti - "Più bella cosa"
- 1997: Pino Daniele - "Che male c'è"
- 1998: Vasco Rossi - "Io no"
- 1999: Jovanotti - "Un raggio di sole"
- 2000: Lùnapop - "Qualcosa di grande"
- 2001: Vasco Rossi - "Ti prendo e ti porto via"
- 2002: Ligabue - "Tutti vogliono viaggiare in prima"
- 2003: Eros Ramazzotti - "Un'emozione per sempre"
- 2004: Zucchero - "Il grande Baboomba"
- 2005: Nek - "Lascia che io sia"
- 2006: Ligabue - "Happy Hour"
- 2007: Negramaro - "Parlami d'amore"
