= Pier Paolo Peroni =

Italian record producer and disc jockey (born 1959)

- Born: 22 November 1959 (age 66); Rome, Italy
- Occupations: Record producer, disc jockey, television producer

Pier Paolo Peroni (born 22 November 1959), also professionally known as Pierpa, is an Italian record producer, disc jockey, and television producer. He is known for his work with the Italian pop group 883 and singer Max Pezzali, as well as his professional association with music producer Claudio Cecchetto.

== Career ==
Peroni began his career as a disc jockey in Rome, where he frequented the Piper and Open Gate nightclubs. Following an invitation from Jovanotti, whom he had met there, he later moved to Milan. Through Jovanotti, Peroni became associated with producer Claudio Cecchetto, and together they subsequently founded the record label Free Records Independent (FRI).

In 1991, Peroni began producing 883 alongside Marco Guarnerio, achieving commercial success in Italy with albums such as Hanno ucciso l'Uomo Ragno (1992) and Nord sud ovest est (1993). After the end of 883 in 2003, Peroni worked as a manager for the group's frontman, Max Pezzali, and was involved in producing later projects revisiting the group's catalogue. Through FRI, Peroni also worked with other Italian artists, including Francesco Facchinetti and the band Finley.

He was responsible for music programming at Radio DeeJay from 1990 to 1994, before holding a similar role at Radio Capital from 1996 to 1998. He also worked at Rai Radio 2 in 1999. In 2014, he created the Sky Uno talent show Top DJ, focused on disc jockeys and electronic music.

Peroni is portrayed by comedian and actor Edoardo Ferrario in the Sky television series Accidentally Famous (2024–2026).

== Personal life ==
Peroni married Italian singer Syria on 29 June 2002. They have two children: Alice, born in 2001; and Romeo, born in 2012.
