= Claudio Cecchetto =

Italian record producer and talent scout (born 1952)

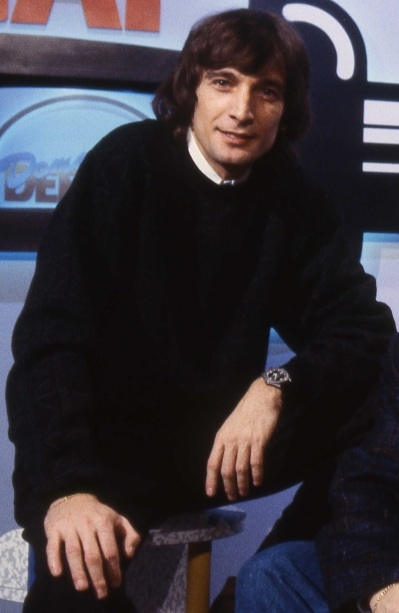
- Cecchetto in 1986
- Born: 19 April 1952 (age 73); Ceggia, Italy
- Occupations: Record producer; talent scout

Claudio Cecchetto (Italian pronunciation: [ˈklaudjo tʃekˈketto]; born 19 April 1952) is an Italian record producer, DJ, musician, and talent scout.

== Life and career ==
Cecchetto was born in Ceggia, a small town in the metropolitan city of Venice. After drumming with a few local bands, he started working as a deejay and became a regular host at Radio 105 Network, one of the first private radio stations in Italy to broadcast on national level. In 1982 he left Radio 105 and founded his own station, Radio DeeJay. In 1984 the Radio expanded to TV with the introduction of the show "Deejay Television" on Italia 1. Under Cecchetto's helm, the radio contributed to launch the career of many presenters, including Gerry Scotti, Albertino, DJ Linus, Fiorello, Marco Mazzoli, Fabio Volo, Daniele Bossari, Marco Baldini and Luca Laurenti. In 1994 Cecchetto was ousted from Radio Deejay following a dispute with his shareholders and went on to create Radio Capital.

In 1981, Cecchetto released his first single, "Gioca-Jouer". The song was a domestic hit and topped the Italian charts. About a year later, Cecchetto released a second single, the upbeat "Ska Ska Chou Chou".

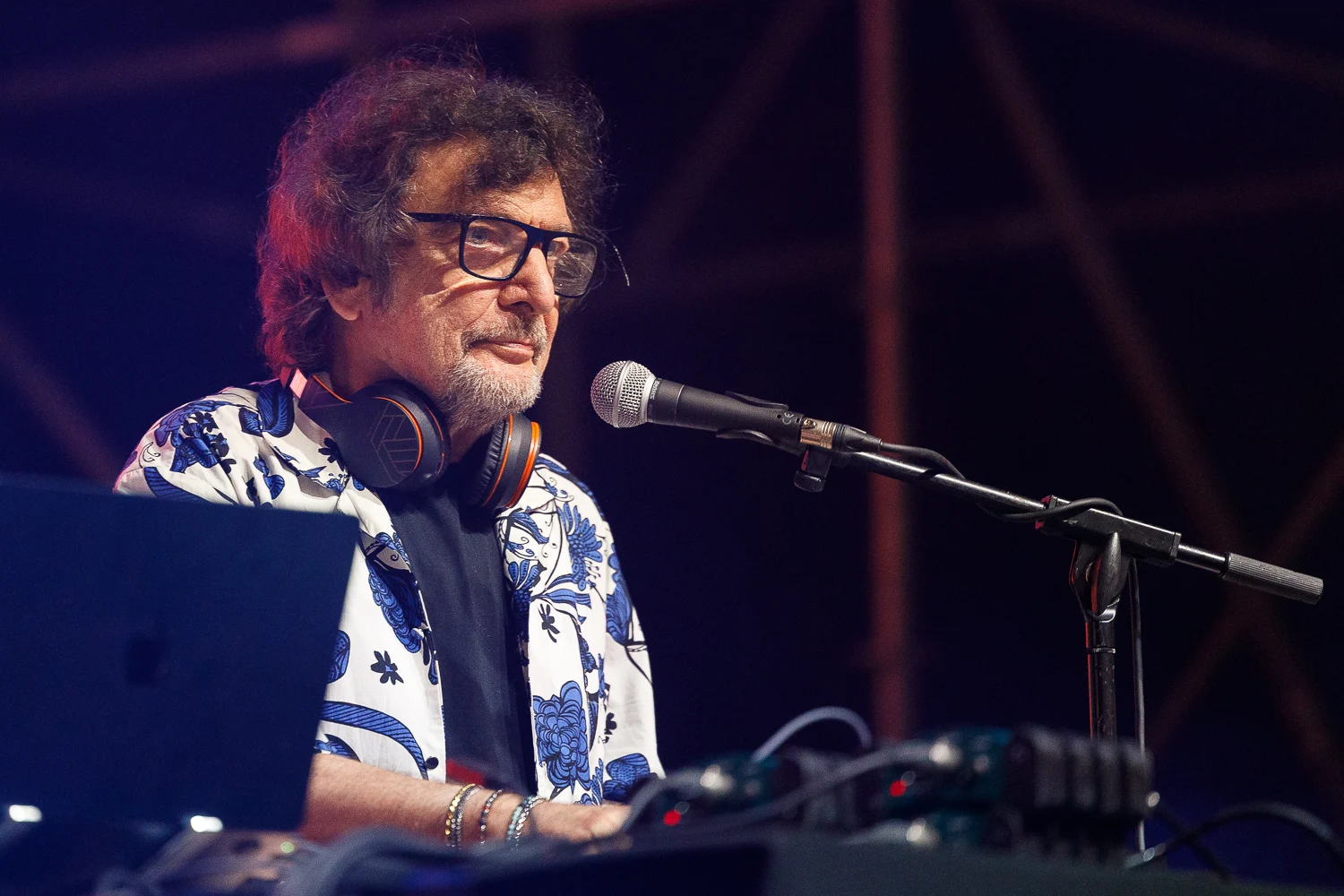
Cecchetto performing in Mondovì, 2025

Over the course of his career, Cecchetto discovered and produced many artists, including Sandy Marton, Jovanotti, Sabrina Salerno, 883, Nikki, B-nario, Tracy Spencer, Taffy and Finley. Cecchetto has also hosted several Italian music festivals, including the Festival di Sanremo and Festivalbar.

== Personal life ==
In the spring of 1992, Cecchetto married Maria Paola Danna in Riccione. They have two children: Jody (born in 1994) and Leonardo (born in 2000).

== Television appearances ==
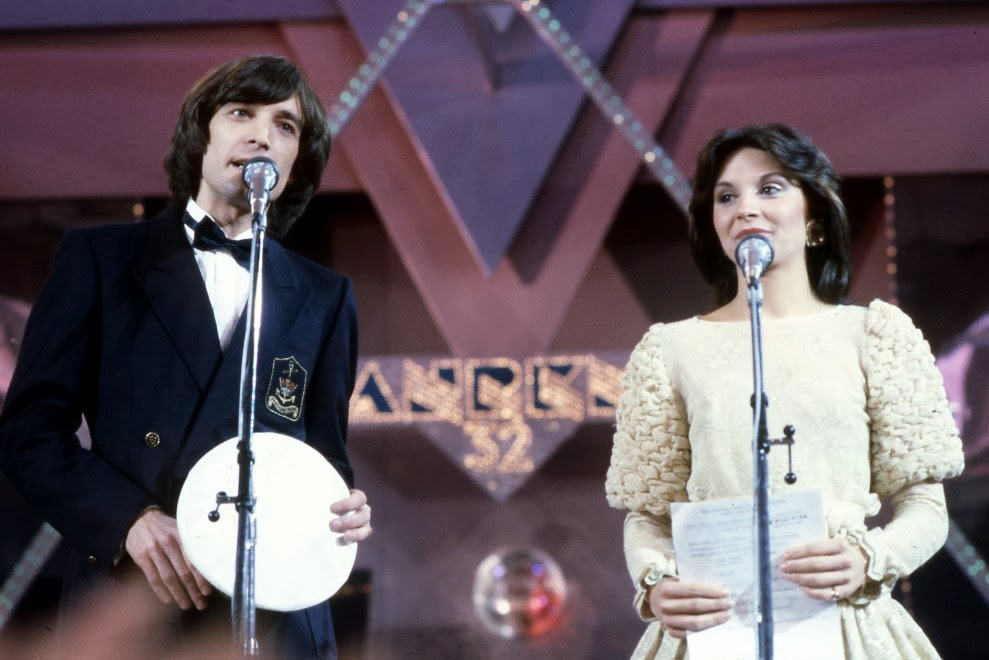
Claudio Cecchetto and Patrizia Rossetti hosting Sanremo Music Festival 1982

- Chewing Gum (Telemilano 58, 1978)
- Discoring (Rete 1, 1979–1982)
- Festival of Sanremo (Rete 1, 1980-81-82)
- Checkmate (Rete 1, 1980)
- Fantastico 2 (Rete 1, 1981)
- Popcorn (Canale 5, 1982–1983)
- Premiatissima (Canale 5, 1982)
- Festivalbar (Canale 5, 1983/1987, Italia 1, 1993)
- Deejay Television (Canale 5, Italia 1, 1983/1990)
- Azzurro (Italia 1, 1984, 1987)
- Supersanremo (Italia 1, 1984–1985)
- Zodiaco (Italia 1, 1985)
- Vote the Voce (Canale 5, 1985–1986)
- Festival di Castrocaro (Rai 1, 1992, 1993, 2002)
- Un disco per l'estate (Rai Uno, 1994)
- Sanremo Young 1996 (Rai Uno, 1996)
- Sanremo Rock 1997 (Rai Uno, 1997)
- Destinazione sanremo (Rai Uno, 2002)
- Ti lascio una canzone (Rai 1, 2008–2009)
- Io canto (Canale 5, 2010–2013)

== Bibliography ==
- Baroni, Joseph (2005). Dizionario della televisione. Raffaello Cortina Editotore. ISBN 88-7078-972-1.
- Grasso, Aldo (2008). Enciclopedia della televisione (3 ed.). Garzanti Editore. ISBN 978-88-11-50526-6.
