= Siamo solo noi =

Studio album by Vasco Rossi
- Released: 3 April 1981
- Studio: Fonoprint, Bologna
- Genre: Pop rock; rock
- Length: 33:00 (original); 33:52 (reprints)
- Language: Italian
- Label: Targa (TAL 1004)
- Producer: Guido Elmi; Mario Rapallo

Vasco Rossi chronology
Colpa d'Alfredo (1980)	Siamo solo noi (1981)	Vado al massimo (1982)

Siamo solo noi (lit. 'It's just us') is the fourth studio album by Italian rock singer-songwriter Vasco Rossi, released in 1981 by Targa.

== Description ==
The album was anticipated by the single Voglio andare al mare / Brava, released in January. The album came after Rossi had begun gaining popularity on a national basis, thanks to his charisma and strong fan following. However, his outcast attitude and drug addiction also had raised criticism, particularly by journalist Nantas Salvalaggio, who attacked Rossi (and foreign musicians as well, most notably Lou Reed) for their hedonism.

The musical structure of the opening track — "Siamo solo noi" — was inspired by Enzo Jannacci and Fred Buscaglione, being a recitato accompanied by a jazz-blues base which hardens into rock music as the song progresses. Starting with a bass riff by Claudio Golinelli, the song uses the same chord progression as "Colpa d'Alfredo" off the previous album (I–V–IV–V in the key of D major) and contains lyrical references to "Fegato, fegato spappolato" (from Non siamo mica gli americani!), "Sensazioni forti" (from Colpa d'Afredo), and the criticism received by Rossi from the media. The lyrics go through a provoking crescendo with references to social criticism and disillusion towards society, concluding with the verses:

Siamo solo noi
generazione di sconvolti
che non-ha più santi né eroi

It's just us
a distraught generation
with no more saints, no more heroes

—Vasco Rossi, "Siamo solo noi"

The song became an anthem for the youth, and Rossi was asked to take part in the Festivalbar with it. However, the singer and the management ultimately opted to concede that "Voglio andare al mare" be played on jukebox. "Incredibile romantica" continues the series of women-inspired songs such as "Silvia", "Susanna" and "Albachiara" from previous albums, depicting the vague image of an "incredibly romantic" girl, left alone after a breakup, reflecting on heartbreak and solitude. "Dimentichiamoci questa città" — which re-uses the main guitar riff off Judas Priest's "Living After Midnight" — homaged Lou Reed and the "sex, drugs, and rock n' roll" lifestyle. Thanks to its uptempo riffing and inciting rhythm, and despite its provoking lyrics and the harsh criticism by Salvaleggio, it was frequently played by Radio Rai and became one of Rossi's most requested songs, as well as his first music video. The lead single, "Voglio andare al mare", comes with more lighthearted lyrics, and is based on a reggae progression improvised by guitarist Massimo Riva. In all reprints, a roughly one-minute reprise is used as the album's outro. As mentioned, the song was chosen as the lead single over the title track, which caused frictions between Rossi and the organisers of the Festivalbar.

The guitar-driven "Brava" is centered around Rossi's first girlfriend, Paola Punzacchi. The sarcastic "Ieri ho sgozzato mio figlio" was the most controversial song of the album starting from its title, which the label censored in the original release. Its lyrics are once more autobiographical, based on the solitude suffered by Rossi during his youth. "Che ironia" is about suffering from love, while "Valium" is a blues song paying tribute to Gino Paoli (alluding to his hit "La gatta") and Giorgio Gaber.

== Track listing ==
All lyrics are written by Vasco Rossi; all music is composed by Rossi, except where noted.

Side A
No.	Title	Music	Length
1.	"Siamo solo noi"	Vasco Rossi • Claudio Golinelli^{[a]} • Maurizio Solieri^{[b]}	5:55
2.	"Incredibile romantica"		4:20
3.	"Dimentichiamoci questa città"	Rossi^{[c]}	4:28
4.	"Voglio andare al mare"		3:40
Total length:			18:23

All tracks are written by Vasco Rossi.

Side B – Original release
No.	Title	Length
4.	"Brava"	4:38
5.	"Ieri ho sgozzato mio figlio^{[d]}"	3:22
7.	"Che ironia"	3:50
8.	"Valium"	3:30
Total length:		15:20

All tracks are written by Vasco Rossi.

Side B – Reprints
No.	Title	Length
4.	"Brava"	4:38
5.	"Ieri ho sgozzato mio figlio^{[d]}"	3:22
7.	"Che ironia"	3:50
8.	"Valium"	3:30
9.	"Voglio andare al mare" (reprise)	0:52
Total length:		16:12

- ^{^[a]} Golinelli is credited for composing the bass riff for "Siamo solo noi".
- ^{^[b]} Solieri is credited for composing the guitar solo for "Siamo solo noi".
- ^{^[c]} "Dimentichiamoci questa città" uses the guitar riff off "Living After Midnight" by Judas Priest (uncredited).
- ^{^[d]} "Ieri ho sg. mio figlio" in both the original release and some reprints.

== Personnel ==
=== Musicians ===
- Vasco Rossi – lead vocals; acoustic guitar (track 7)
- Maurizio Solieri – rhythm and lead guitars (all tracks)
- Massimo Riva – rhythm and acoustic guitars (tracks 1–3, 6, 8)
- Romano Trevisani – rhythm guitars (tracks 4, 7)
- Claudio "Galina" Golinelli – bass guitar (all tracks)
- Gabriele "Lele" Melotti – drums (tracks 1–6, 8–9)
- Roberto Casini – drums (track 7)
- Gaetano Curreri – keyboards (tracks 1–2, 4, 9)
- Ivano "Fio" Zanotti – keyboards, piano, Hammond (tracks 1, 3, 5–7)
- Guido Elmi – percussions (tracks 4, 7, 9)

=== Production ===
- Vasco Rossi – arrangements (all tracks)
- Guido Elmi – producer
- Mario Rapallo – producer
- Titti Maffei – associate producer
- Maurizio Biancani – sound engineer
- Piero Mannucci – mastering
- Isaia Cassani – photography
- Roberto Serra – photography
- Stefano Giraldi – photography
