= List of number-one hits of 2001 (Italy) =

This is a list of the number-one hits of 2001 on FIMI's Italian Singles and Albums Charts.

Week	Issue date	Song	Artist	Album	Artist
1	5 January	"Goodnight Moon"	Shivaree	1	The Beatles
2	12 January	"Love Don't Cost a Thing"	Jennifer Lopez	1	The Beatles
3	19 January	"Io sono Francesco"	Tricarico	Amore nel pomeriggio	Francesco De Gregori
4	26 January	"Stuck in a Moment You Can't Get Out Of"	U2	Amore nel pomeriggio	Francesco De Gregori
5	2 February	"Goodnight Moon"	Shivaree	Esco di rado e parlo ancora meno	Adriano Celentano
6	9 February	"Goodnight Moon"	Shivaree	Esco di rado e parlo ancora meno	Adriano Celentano
7	16 February	"Goodnight Moon"	Shivaree	Esco di rado e parlo ancora meno	Adriano Celentano
8	23 February	"Stan"	Eminem featuring Dido	Esco di rado e parlo ancora meno	Adriano Celentano
9	2 March	"Luce (tramonti a nord est)"	Elisa	Il cammino dell'età	Gigi D'Alessio
10	9 March	"Luce (tramonti a nord est)"	Elisa	Il cammino dell'età	Gigi D'Alessio
11	16 March	"Luce (tramonti a nord est)"	Elisa	Esco di rado e parlo ancora meno	Adriano Celentano
12	23 March	"Luce (tramonti a nord est)"	Elisa	Esco di rado e parlo ancora meno	Adriano Celentano
13	30 March	"Down Down Down"	Lollipop	Live in New York City	Bruce Springsteen & the E Street Band
14	6 April	"Down Down Down"	Lollipop	Stupido hotel	Vasco Rossi
15	13 April	"Down Down Down"	Lollipop	Stupido hotel	Vasco Rossi
16	20 April	"Dream On"	Depeche Mode	Stupido hotel	Vasco Rossi
17	27 April	"Down Down Down"	Lollipop	Stupido hotel	Vasco Rossi
18	4 May	"It's Raining Men"	Geri Halliwell	Stupido hotel	Vasco Rossi
19	11 May	"Me Gustas Tú"	Manu Chao	Reveal	R.E.M.
20	18 May	"Clint Eastwood"	Gorillaz	Reveal	R.E.M.
21	25 May	"It's Raining Men"	Geri Halliwell	Stupido hotel	Vasco Rossi
22	1 June	"It's Raining Men"	Geri Halliwell	Próxima Estación: Esperanza	Manu Chao
23	8 June	"It's Raining Men"	Geri Halliwell	Próxima Estación: Esperanza	Manu Chao
24	15 June	"It's Raining Men"	Geri Halliwell	Próxima Estación: Esperanza	Manu Chao
25	22 June	"It's Raining Men"	Geri Halliwell	Uno in più	883
26	29 June	"It's Raining Men"	Geri Halliwell	Uno in più	883
27	6 July	"Infinito"	Raf	Uno in più	883
28	13 July	"Baila (Sexy Thing)"	Zucchero	Stupido hotel	Vasco Rossi
29	20 July	"Tre parole"	Valeria Rossi	Stupido hotel	Vasco Rossi
30	27 July	"Tre parole"	Valeria Rossi	Circo Massimo 2001	Antonello Venditti
31	3 August	"Tre parole"	Valeria Rossi	Stupido hotel	Vasco Rossi
32	10 August	"Tre parole"	Valeria Rossi	Stupido hotel	Vasco Rossi
33	17 August	"Tre parole"	Valeria Rossi	Stupido hotel	Vasco Rossi
34	24 August	"Tre parole"	Valeria Rossi	Stupido hotel	Vasco Rossi
35	31 August	"Tre parole"	Valeria Rossi	A Funk Odyssey	Jamiroquai
36	7 September	"Xdono"	Tiziano Ferro	A Funk Odyssey	Jamiroquai
37	14 September	"Xdono"	Tiziano Ferro	Shake	Zucchero
38	21 September	"Xdono"	Tiziano Ferro	Shake	Zucchero
39	28 September	"Xdono"	Tiziano Ferro	Shake	Zucchero
40	5 October	"Can't Get You Out of My Head"	Kylie Minogue	Shake	Zucchero
41	12 October	"Can't Get You Out of My Head"	Kylie Minogue	The Best of Laura Pausini: E ritorno da te	Laura Pausini
42	19 October	"Can't Get You Out of My Head"	Kylie Minogue	The Best of Laura Pausini: E ritorno da te	Laura Pausini
43	26 October	"Can't Get You Out of My Head"	Kylie Minogue	LU*CA	Luca Carboni
44	2 November	"Can't Get You Out of My Head"	Kylie Minogue	Echoes: The Best of Pink Floyd	Pink Floyd
45	9 November	"Can't Get You Out of My Head"	Kylie Minogue	La curva dell'angelo	Renato Zero
46	16 November	"Can't Get You Out of My Head"	Kylie Minogue	Echoes: The Best of Pink Floyd	Pink Floyd
47	23 November	"Can't Get You Out of My Head"	Kylie Minogue	Echoes: The Best of Pink Floyd	Pink Floyd
48	30 November	"Can't Get You Out of My Head"	Kylie Minogue	Echoes: The Best of Pink Floyd	Pink Floyd
49	7 December	"Can't Get You Out of My Head"	Kylie Minogue	Echoes: The Best of Pink Floyd	Pink Floyd
50	14 December	"Somethin' Stupid"	Robbie Williams and Nicole Kidman	Echoes: The Best of Pink Floyd	Pink Floyd
51	21 December	"Paid My Dues"	Anastacia	Echoes: The Best of Pink Floyd	Pink Floyd
52	28 December	"Paid My Dues"	Anastacia	The Best of Laura Pausini: E ritorno da te	Laura Pausini

== See also ==
- 2001 in music
- List of number-one hits in Italy
