= Buoni o cattivi =

Studio album by Vasco Rossi
- Released: 2 April 2004
- Studio: Digital Studio (Bologna); Fonoprint (Bologna); Henson Studios (Los Angeles); Studio Impatto; Studio Nautilus (Milan)
- Length: 48:01
- Label: EMI
- Producer: Guido Elmi; Vasco Rossi

Vasco Rossi chronology
| Tracks (2002) | Buoni o cattivi (2004) | Buoni o cattivi Live Anthology 04.05 (2005) |

Buoni o cattivi is the fourteenth studio album by Italian singer-songwriter Vasco Rossi, released on 2 April 2004.

The album spent fifteen non-consecutive weeks atop the Italian FIMI Albums Chart, and later became Italy's best-selling album of 2004. It also entered the charts in Switzerland, peaking at number 6 and being certified gold in the country.

It spawned the singles "Buoni o cattivi", "Come stai", "Un senso", "E…" and "Señorita". "Un senso" also appeared on the soundtrack of the film Non ti muovere by Sergio Castellitto. Despite not being included in the film's official soundtrack, "Un senso" was awarded a Nastro d'Argento for Best Original Song in 2005.

== Track listing ==
| No. | Title | Writer(s) | Length |
|---|---|---|---|
| 1. | "Buoni o cattivi" | Vasco Rossi; Gaetano Curreri; Saverio Grandi | 3:31 |
| 2. | "Come stai" | Rossi; Guido Elmi; Tullio Ferro | 4:21 |
| 3. | "Anymore" | Rossi | 4:28 |
| 4. | "Hai mai" | Rossi; Elmi; Ferro | 4:39 |
| 5. | "Non basta niente" | Rossi; Ferro | 4:11 |
| 6. | "Dimenticarsi" | Rossi; Elmi; Ferro | 4:42 |
| 7. | "Da sola con te" | Rossi; Ferro | 3:32 |
| 8. | "Cosa vuoi da me" | Rossi; Elmi; Ferro | 3:41 |
| 9. | "E…" | Rossi; Maria Pia Tuccitto; Giacomo Cristini | 3:29 |
| 10. | "Señorita" | Rossi; Roberto Casini | 3:39 |
| 11. | "Rock 'n' roll show" | Rossi; Maurizio Solieri | 3:40 |
| 12. | "Un senso" | Rossi; Grandi; Curreri | 4:08 |

== Personnel ==
Adapted from Buoni o cattivi's liner notes.

Production

- Antonio Baglio – mastering
- Luca Bignardi – mixing (3, 5, 9, 12), engineer (3, 5, 9, 12)
- Marco Borsatti – assistant (3, 5, 9, 12)
- Guido Elmi – producer
- Floriano Fini – executive producer
- Enrico "Flint" Mambella – assistant (3, 5, 9, 12)
- Vasco Rossi – producer
- Davide Roveri – assistant (3, 5, 9, 12)
- Jaime Sickora – assistant (3, 5, 9, 12)
- Michael Tacci – engineer (3, 5, 9, 12)
- Mark Valentine – assistant (3, 5, 9, 12)
- Celso Valli – co-producer (3, 5, 9, 12)
- Nicola Venieri – mixing (1−2, 4, 6−8, 10−11), engineer (1−12)

Music

- Luca Bignardi – programming (3, 5, 9, 12)
- Nando Bonini – background vocals (1−2, 4, 6, 8, 11)
- Stef Burns – electric guitar (1−2, 4−8, 10−12), solo guitar (2, 7), acoustic guitar (5), guitar (8)
- Paul Bushnell – bass (8)
- Giacomo Castellano – electric guitars (5, 12)
- Vinnie Colaiuta – drums (1−12)
- Larry Corbett – cello
- Bruce Dukov – violin
- Guido Elmi – arrangements (1−2, 4, 6−8, 10−11), harpsichord (1, 2), congas (5), electric guitar (8), drums (11)
- Tony Franklin – bass (1, 3−4, 6, 8, 11)
- Andrea Innesto – wind instruments (11)
- Suzie Katayama – orchestra conductor
- Michael Landau – electric guitar (2, 4, 8, 12), guitars (3), solo guitar (4)
- Clara Moroni – background vocals (1−2, 4, 6, 8, 11)
- Frank Nemola – programming (1, 2, 4, 6, 7, 10−11), keyboards (1, 2, 4, 6−8, 10), string arrangements (2, 4, 7, 10), background vocals (4, 8), arrangements (6, 7, 10), wind instruments (11)
- Dean Parks – acoustic guitar (1, 2, 4, 6, 10)
- Tim Pierce – electric guitar (1, 2, 4, 6, 7), solo guitar (6)
- Silvio Pozzoli – background vocals (1−2, 4, 6, 8, 11)
- Alberto Rocchetti – Hammond (11)
- Vasco Rossi − vocals (1−12)
- Lee Sklar – bass (2, 4−5, 7, 9, 10, 12)
- Maurizio Solieri – electric guitar (11)
- Michael Thompson – electric guitar (1, 2, 4, 6, 10)
- Celso Valli – Hammond (2, 7, 9), string conductor (2−5, 7, 9, 10, 12), string arrangements (3, 5, 9, 12), arrangements (3, 5, 12), keyboards (3, 5, 9, 12), electric bass (5), piano (9, 12)
- Patrick Warren – piano (6)
- Evan Wilson – viola

== Charts ==
=== Weekly charts ===
| Chart (2004) | Peak position |
|---|---|
| Italian Albums (FIMI) | 1 |
| Swiss Albums (Schweizer Hitparade) | 6 |

=== Annual charts ===
| Chart (2004) | Position |
|---|---|
| Italy (FIMI) | 1 |
| Switzerland (Schweizer Hitparade) | 84 |

== Certifications and sales ==
| Region | Certification | Certified units/sales |
|---|---|---|
| Italy | — | 400,000 |
| Italy (FIMI) Since 2009 | Platinum | 50,000^{‡} |
| Switzerland (IFPI Switzerland) | Gold | 20,000^{^} |
^{^} Shipments figures based on certification alone.^{‡} Sales+streaming figures based on certification alone.
