= ...Ma cosa vuoi che sia una canzone... =

Studio album by Vasco Rossi
- Released: 25 May 1978
- Recorded: 1976–1978
- Studios: Fonoprint, Bologna
- Genre: Pop rock
- Length: 31:16
- Language: Italian
- Label: Lotus (LOS 12802)
- Producer: Alan Taylor

Vasco Rossi chronology
...Ma cosa vuoi che sia una canzone... (1978)	Non siamo mica gli americani! (1979)

Singles from ...Ma cosa vuoi che sia una canzone...
- 1. "Jenny / Silvia" Released: 15 June 1977; 2. "La nostra relazione / ...e poi mi parli di una vita insieme" Released: 10 May 1978

...Ma cosa vuoi che sia una canzone... ("...But what's a song anyway...") is the debut studio album by Italian rock singer-songwriter Vasco Rossi, released by Lotus in 1978.

== Description ==
The album was anticipated by two singles: Jenny / Silvia (June 1977) and La nostra relazione / ...e poi mi parli di una vita insieme (May 1978). The LP was printed in an initial run of 20,000 copies, and distributed in Lombardy and Emilia-Romagna by Ricordi.

Gaetano Curreri (credited as "Bethoten"), Giovanni Pezzoli and Ricky Portera, three of the founders of the rock band Stadio, participated in the recording sessions. Maurizio Solieri, who recorded acoustic guitars for "Ed il tempo crea eroi", would become Rossi's longest-serving live guitarist.

The songs were produced either by Edizioni Musicali Sarabandas (tracks 1, 4, 6–8) or Edizione Discografica Borgatti (tracks 3 and 5), with track 2 being a co-production involving both labels.

The album failed to enter Italian charts at the time of its release but was valued anew following Rossi's rise to success during the 1980s and 1990s. It reached No. 27 in 1996, and entered the charts again in 2017 following Rossi's fortieth-year anniversary and the Modena Park 2017 show.

The album was certified Gold by FIMI.

== Track listing ==
All tracks are written by Vasco Rossi.

Side A
No.	Title	Producer(s)	Length
1.	"La nostra relazione"	Sarabandas	3:00
2.	"...e poi mi parli di una vita insieme"	Sarabandas • Borgetti	4:27
3.	"Silvia"	Borgetti	3:31
4.	"Tu che dormivi piano (volò via)"	Sarabandas	4:17
Total length:			15:15

Side B
No.	Title	Producer(s)	Length
5.	"Jenny è pazza!"	Borgetti	7:11
6.	"Ambarabaciccicoccò"	Sarabandas	4:00
7.	"Ed il tempo crea eroi"	Sarabandas	3:28
8.	"Ciao" (instrumental)	Sarabandas	1:22
Total length:			16:01

== Personnel ==
=== Musicians ===
- Vasco Rossi – lead vocals; acoustic guitar; 12-strings acoustic guitar
- Riccardo Bellei – backing vocals
- Enzo Troiano – electric guitar
- Giovanni Oleandri – bass guitar
- Gaetano "Bethoten" Curreri – keyboards; arrangements (all tracks)
- Gilberto "Attila" Rossi – drums (save track 4)
- Maurizio Solieri – acoustic guitar (track 7)
- Giovanni Pezzoli – drums (track 4)
- Dino Melotti – recorder; saxophone
- Lauro Minzoni – recorder; percussions
- Paolo Giacomoni – electric violin
- Iskra Menarini – backing vocals
- Ricky Portera – backing vocals

=== Production ===
- Alan Taylor – producer
- Maurizio Biancani – sound engineer
- Luciano Tallarini – cover art
- Mirko Giardini – cover art
- Francesco Costantini – principal photography
- Marco Manzini – live photography
