= Non siamo mica gli americani! =

Studio album by Vasco Rossi
- Released: 30 April 1979
- Recorded: November–December 1978
- Studios: Fonoprint, Bologna (recording); Cap Studio, Bologna (mixing)
- Genres: Pop rock; hard rock
- Length: 34:56
- Language: Italian
- Label: Lotus (LOP 12804)
- Producer: Alan Taylor

Vasco Rossi chronology
...Ma cosa vuoi che sia una canzone... (1978)	Non siamo mica gli americani! (1979)	Colpa d'Alfredo (1980)

Singles from Non siamo mica gli americani!
- 1. "Albachiara / Fegato, fegato spappolato" Released: 25 May 1979

Non siamo mica gli americani! ("We're not Americans!") is the second studio album by Italian rock singer-songwriter Vasco Rossi, released in 1979. It contains Rossi's first and biggest hit, "Albachiara".

== Description ==
The album was Rossi's second and last released by Lotus, the recording company that distributed Rossi's debut album ...Ma cosa vuoi che sia una canzone....

The only single out of Non siamo mica gli americani!, "Albachiara / Fegato, fegato spappolato", contains the rock ballad "Albachiara". Although coldly welcomed by critics at first, the song became a staple in the artist's live shows, usually sung by the audience together with him, and with the final guitar solo extended while Rossi introduces his band to the fans. The song's lyrics, whose first verses have been referred to as the most famous incipit in Italian pop music, describe a 'typical-atypical' girl next door, who "never wears anything to draw attention" and "walks down the streets, eating an apple, bearing schoolbooks" because "[she] enjoys studying", and close with an explicit reference to the girl exploring masturbation. Rossi wrote the lyrics in a quick burst of inspiration, while at home studying for a university exam, based on a teenager girl that used to live in his native Zocca, as confirmed by Rossi's friend and then-collaborator Gaetano Curreri. Years later, Rossi met the young woman and informed her that she was his song's inspiring Muse; hit by her disbelief, he composed the lyrics to "Una canzone per te" (out of Bollicine). Artists like Curreri and Noemi have expressed admiration for the song.

The punk-inspired lyrics of the other song in the single, "Fegato, fegato spappolato", depict a provincial town on a spring morning, pointing out repetitive and boring lifestyle, hypocrisy and false respectability. Punk themes of social criticism also emerge in "Sballi ravvicinati del 3° tipo", an exploration of Rossi's atheism, and in "(per quello che ho da fare) Faccio il militare", while "Quindici anni fa" is influenced by contemporary prog artists such as Area, Banco del Mutuo Soccorso and Eugenio Finardi. The closing song of Side A, the aforementioned "(per quel che ho da fare) Faccio il militare", satyrizes Italy's then-compulsory military service, from which Rossi had been discharged due to the use of psychotropic drugs.

Rossi transferred the rights on half of his royalties to producer Alan Taylor in exchange for a Martin acoustic guitar, which at the time was too expensive for Rossi to buy. All songs were produced by Edizioni Musicali Sarabandas.

== Track listing ==
All tracks are written by Vasco Rossi.

Side A
No.	Title	Length
1.	"Io non-so più cosa fare"	3:58
2.	"Fegato, fegato spappolato"	3:15
3.	"Sballi ravvicinati del 3° tipo"	5:09
4.	"(per quello che ho da fare) Faccio il militare"	4:31
Total length:		16:53

All tracks are written by Rossi, except where noted.

Side B
No.	Title	Music	Length
5.	"(per quello che ho da fare) Faccio il militare" (reprise)		0:36
6.	"La strega (la diva del sabato sera)"	Sergio Silvestri	4:42
7.	"Albachiara"		4:05
8.	"Quindici anni fa"		5:10
9.	"Va bè (se proprio te lo devo dire)"		3:09
Total length:			17:42

== Personnel ==
=== Musicians ===
- Vasco Rossi – lead vocals
- Maurizio Solieri – electric and acoustic guitars, mandolin, cimbalom
- Gian Emilio "Ciccio" Tassoni – electric bass, double bass
- Gaetano Curreri – keyboards, piano, synthesizer, Moog, effects, arrangements
- Antonio Mancuso – keyboards
- Giovanni Pezzoli – drums, percussions
- Sandro Comini – trombone
- Massimo "Rudy" Trevisi – saxophone, clarinet

=== Production ===
- Alan Taylor – producer, mixing
- Maurizio Biancani – sound engineering
- Gianni Prudente – mixing
- Auro Arbizzo – mixing (assistant)
