= Colpa d'Alfredo =

Studio album by Vasco Rossi
- Released: 3 April 1980
- Recorded: 1979
- Studio: Fonoprint, Bologna; UMBI Studios, Modena
- Genre: Rock; punk rock; pop rock
- Length: 32:45
- Language: Italian
- Label: Targa
- Producer: Alan Taylor; Vasco Rossi

Vasco Rossi chronology
Non siamo mica gli americani! (1979)	Colpa d'Alfredo (1980)	Siamo solo noi (1981)

Singles from Colpa d'Alfredo
- 1. "Non l'hai mica capito / Asilo 'Republic'" Released: 30 January 1980

Colpa d'Alfredo (lit. '[It's] Alfredo's fault') is the third studio album by Italian rock singer-songwriter Vasco Rossi, released on 3 April 1980 by Targa.

== Description ==
The album was anticipated by the single Non l'hai mica capito / Asilo 'Republic', released in January 1980. Initially, the title track —which would become one of the album's most famous songs – was considered. However, it was put aside because of its explicit lyrics, where Rossi laments having lost the opportunity of hanging out with a girl because of Alfredo, who distracted him, with the girl leaving with "un negro" instead. The racial slur being uncensored, together with the girl being called "la troia" ("a whore"), raised controversy around the song, with some radio refusing to play it. Andrea Giacobazzi, longtime friend of Rossi, revealed that the lyrics were partially autobiographical, although Rossi did not miss a date with a girl, but had to travel to Misano Adriatico where he had a gig booked. According to Rossi, the lyrics were inspired by another occasion, where he missed a date because he played Space Invaders while chatting with Alfredo.

On the occasion of the album's fortieth anniversary re-release, Rossi's speaker Tania Sachs reported the singer's comment on the lyrics of "Colpa d'Alfredo" and the controversy surrounding them:

Italian: In fondo a me è andata bene. All'epoca la RCA censurava i suoi cantanti. Io, invece, incidevo per un'etichetta indipendente che mi lasciava carta bianca e non ascoltava nemmeno i miei pezzi.

[All considered, I was lucky. Back in those days, at RCA they used to censor their singers. But I was recording for an independent label, which left me carte blanche and didn't even listen to my music.]

— Vasco Rossi

Among the other songs, "Tropico del Cancro" continues the style of the previous two albums, while "Sensazioni forti" and "Asilo 'Republic'" are influenced by punk rock, and "Susanna" and "Alibi" are rock-prone – at the time, according to Maurizio Biancani, Rossi was particularly fond of The Clash and The Rolling Stones. The closing track of Side A, the piano-driven ballad "Anima fragile", despite having sometimes been interpreted as a dedication to the singer's father Giovanni Carlo "Carlino" (passed away in 1979), is a love song inspired by a former girlfriend of Vasco Rossi.

Colpa d'Alfredo is the last Vasco Rossi album featuring Gaetano Curreri, before he founded the rock band Stadio. He only recorded a one-take piano part for "Anima fragile". It was also his last album produced by Alan Taylor and the first one where Guido Elmi was featured: he would go on to produce all future albums of the artist, before his death in 2017.

Following the album's release, the musicians who worked on the album formed the Steve Rogers Band, becoming Vasco Rossi's official supporting band.

== Track listing ==
All tracks are written by Vasco Rossi.

Side A
No.	Title	Producer(s)	Length
1.	"Non l'hai mica capito"	Vasco Rossi • Alan Taylor	3:50
2.	"Colpa d'Alfredo"	Rossi • Taylor	5:00
3.	"Susanna"	Rossi • Taylor	3:20
4.	"Anima fragile"	Rossi • Taylor	3:43
Total length:			15:53

All tracks are written by Rossi.

Side B
No.	Title	Producer(s)	Length
5.	"Alibi"	Rossi • Taylor	5:34
6.	"Sensazioni forti"	Rossi • Taylor	4:02
7.	"Tropico del Cancro"	Rossi • Taylor	5:27
8.	"Asilo 'Republic'"	Rossi • Taylor	1:47
Total length:			16:50

== Personnel ==
=== Musicians ===
- Vasco Rossi – lead vocals
- Maurizio Solieri – acoustic and electric guitar
- Gaetano Curreri – keyboards; piano (track 4)
- Bruno Corticelli – bass guitar; double bass
- Arcangelo "Kaba" Cavazzutti – drums
- Guido Elmi – guitars; percussions
- Enzo Feliciati – keyboards
- Guido Zuppiroli – bass guitar; double bass
- Maurizio Maggi – instrumentation; backing vocals
- Roberto Costa – bass guitar; arrangements
- Auro Lugli – backing vocals
- Rosy and Daniela – backing vocals
- Massimo Riva – backing vocals

=== Production ===
- Vasco Rossi – producer
- Alan Taylor – executive producer
- Ruggero Penazzo – mixing
- Arun Chakraverty – mastering
- Luciano Tallarini – cover art
- Mauro Balletti – photography
