= Barillet =

Barillet is a surname. Notable people with the surname include:

- Louis Barillet (1880–1948), French artist, known for his work in stained glass
- Pierre Barillet (1923–2019), French playwright

== See also ==
- Baillet
