= Vado al massimo =

Studio album by Vasco Rossi
- Released: 13 April 1982
- Recorded: October–December 1982
- Studios: Fonoprint, Bologna
- Genres: Pop rock; Rock
- Length: 36:50
- Language: Italian
- Label: Carosello (CLN 25095)
- Producer: Guido Elmi

Vasco Rossi chronology
Siamo solo noi (1981)	Vado al massimo (1982)	Bollicine (1983)

Singles from Vado al massimo
- 1. "Vado al massimo" Released: 2 February 1982; 2. "Una splendida giornata (remix)" Released: 1982

Vado al massimo (lit. 'I'm going full speed') is the fifth studio album by Italian rock singer-songwriter Vasco Rossi, released in 1982 by Carosello.

== Description ==
The title track was presented at the Sanremo Music Festival of 1982 (28–30 January), where Rossi ended runner-up. The lyrics are a sarcastic reply to the media who harshly criticised him, and in particular to journalist Nantas Salvalaggio, who had written a specific column titled "Anche alla TV c'è "'l'ero" libera", dealing with Rossi's performance during Domenica in on 14 December 1980 and harshly attacking the singer:

Per descriverlo, mi ci vorrebbe la penna di un Grosz, di un Maccari: un bell’ebete, anzi un ebete piuttosto bruttino, malfermo sulle gambe, con gli occhiali fumé dello zombie, dell’alcolizzato, del drogato "fatto"
It would take me a Grosz, a Maccari to describe him: a beautiful fool – or rather, quite an ugly one, unsteady on his feet, wearing smoked glasses like a zombie, an alcoholic, a stoned drug addict.

— N. Salvalaggio, "Anche alla TV c'è "l'ero" libera"

"Splendida giornata" was also released as a maxi-single featuring on side A a remix by Mario Boncaldo, and on Side B the song in instrumental version.

"Canzone" was written by Rossi remembering his late father Giovanni Carlo, who had passed away in 1979. Written by Maurizio Solieri, the song was presented to Rossi by Guido Elmi and has often been performed live in a new arrangement for piano and voice only, and dedicated to the memory of Massimo Riva following the guitarist's death in 1999 for drug overdose. "Splendida giornata" describes a day of excesses as if it was a day at work, and Rossi had to rework its lyrics because Carosello would not distribute the original, more explicit version. "La noia" was inspired by Rossi's village, Zocca, and its lyrics imagine a dialogue between Rossi and an old friend who had not left the place. Rossi called it his favorite song.

== Track listing ==
All tracks are written by Vasco Rossi.

Side A
No.	Title	Length
1.	"Sono ancora in coma"	2:55^{[a]}
2.	"Cosa ti fai"	3:00^{[b]}
3.	"Ogni volta"	4:14^{[c]}
4.	"Vado al massimo"	3:40^{[d]}
5.	"Credi davvero"	4:45^{[e]}
Total length:		18:34^{[f]}

All lyrics are written by Vasco Rossi; all music is composed by Rossi, except where noted.

Side B
No.	Title	Music	Length
6.	"Amore!?!^{[g]}"		4:40^{[h]}
7.	"Canzone"	Maurizio Solieri • Rossi	4:10^{[i]}
8.	"Splendida giornata"	Tullio Ferro	4:30^{[j]}
9.	"La noia"	Ferro	4:20^{[k]}
Total length:			17:40^{[l]}

- ^{^[a]} 2:59 on digital releases.
- ^{^[b]} 2:49 on digital releases.
- ^{^[c]} 4:11 on digital releases.
- ^{^[d]} 4:10 on German release and 4:17 on digital releases.
- ^{^[e]} 4:46 on German release and 4:57 on digital releases.
- ^{^[f]} 19:32 on German release and 19:03 on digital releases.
- ^{^[g]} Titled "Amore... Aiuto" on digital releases.
- ^{^[h]} 4:37 on German release and 4:42 on digital releases.
- ^{^[i]} 4:07 on German release and 4:18 on digital releases.
- ^{^[j]} 4:44 on digital releases.
- ^{^[k]} 4:31 on digital releases.
- ^{^[l]} 17:59 on German release and 17:15 on digital releases.

== Personnel ==
=== Musicians ===
- Vasco Rossi – lead vocals
- Maurizio Solieri – lead guitars
- Massimo Riva – rhythm guitars
- Tullio Ferro – rhythm guitars
- Gaetano Curreri – keyboards
- Claudio Golinelli – bass guitar
- Pier Michelatti – bass guitar
- Gabriele Melotti – drums
- Rossana Casale – backing vocals
- Lella Esposito – backing vocals
- Mauro Pagani – bowed instruments

=== Production ===
- Guido Elmi – producer; sound effects; photography
- Vasco Rossi – arrangements
- Rudy Trevisi – arrangements (horns)
- Maurizio Biancani – assistant producer; soung engineering; programming; sound effects
- Isaia Cassani – photography
