= Baillet =

Baillet is a surname. Notable people with the surname include:

- House of Baillet, created count of Baillet by emperor Charles VI, members of the Belgian Nobility.
  - Alfred de Baillet Latour
  - Christophe-Ernest, 1st Count of Baillet
  - Henri de Baillet-Latour
  - Theodor Franz, Count Baillet von Latour
  - Maximilian Anton Karl, Count Baillet de Latour
  - Ferdinand de Baillet-Latour
  - Artois-Baillet Latour Foundation

== Other ==
Adrien Baillet
