= Kroemer =

Kroemer or Krömer is a surname. Notable people with the surname include:

- Guido Kroemer (born 1961), cell biologist
- Herbert Kroemer (1928-2024), a professor of electrical and computer engineering

== See also ==
- 24751 Kroemer (1992 SS24), a main-belt asteroid discovered on 1992
