= Musée de l'Histoire vivante =

Museum in Montreuil-sous-bois, France

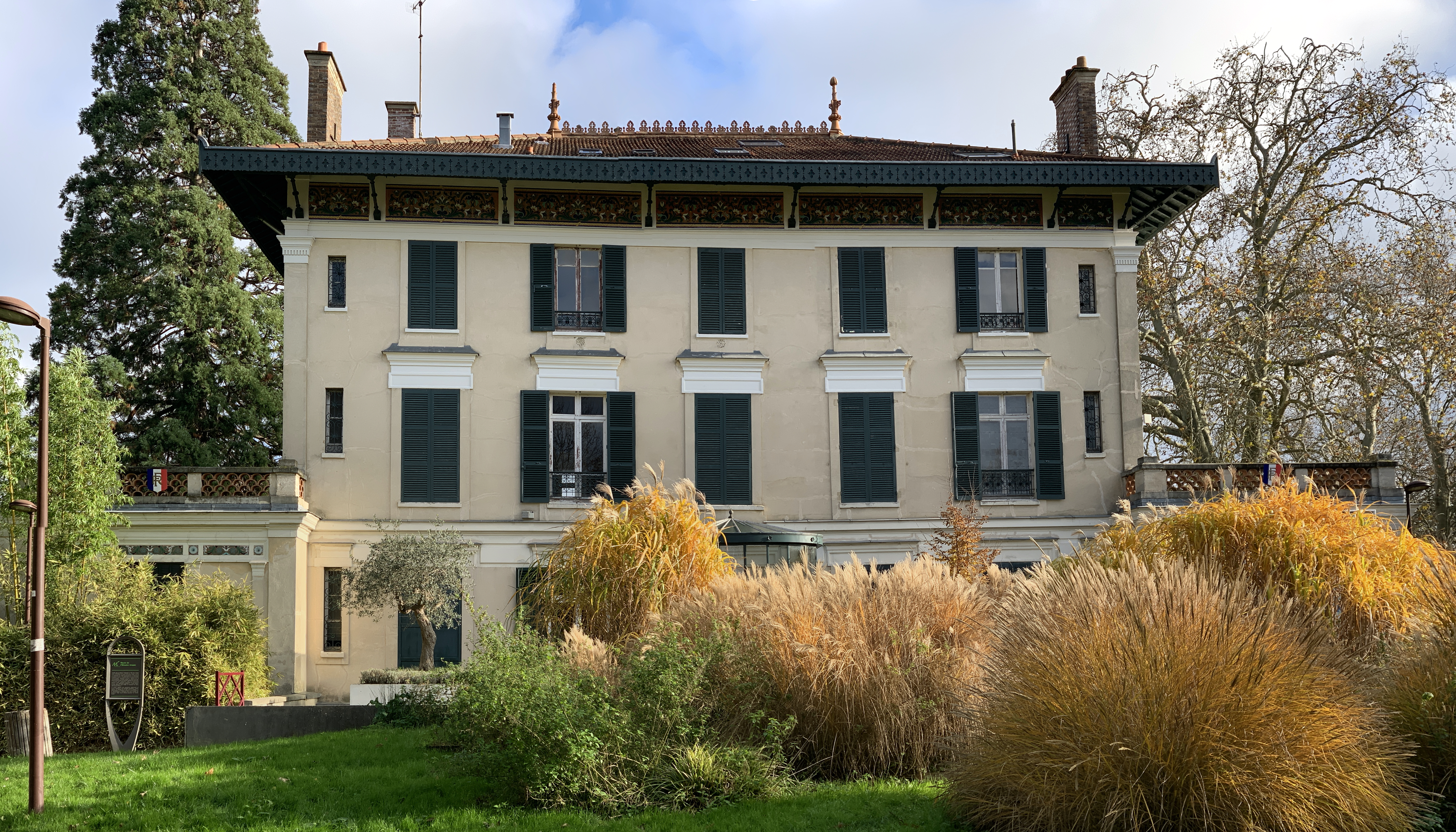
- Location: France
- Visitors: 6,493 (2023)
- Website: Official website

The Musée de l'Histoire vivante (Museum of Living History) is a history museum located in Montreuil-sous-bois, adjacent to the eastern part of Paris, France.

Founded in 1937 by the Association pour l'Histoire Vivante at the initiative of French communist Jacques Duclos, it opened its doors on March 26, 1939, to mark the 150th anniversary of the French Revolution, under the direction of Jean Bruhat. It covers the history of social movements, colonization, and decolonization, as well as the suburbs and industrial heritage of the city of Montreuil. Since then, its scope has expanded, notably through temporary exhibitions.

== History of the Museum ==
During the Second World War, the museum's collections were hidden in a farm in Seine-et-Marne. It officially reopened to the public on 22 June 1946. Later, it presented new rooms devoted to the Occupation and Libération. A room is also dedicated to Karl Marx.

In the 1960s and 1970s, a significant drop in attendance led to the museum's semi-closing, not all spaces being opened to the visitors.

After a complete renovation (refurbishment of the rooms, creation of a reserve, computerization of funds, new presentation of the permanent exhibition), the museum reopened its doors in September 1988, with a temporary exhibition devoted to "Jean Jaurès and the French Revolution". It then acquired the status of a museum controlled by the Direction des musées de France.

== The Museum today ==
The museum houses iconographic collections from the Revolution to the 1960s as well as archival collections of several activists and leaders of the French Communist Party (Jacques Duclos, Daniel Renoult, Marcel Dufriche, archives of socialist and far-left activists, in particular.

The museum houses a space dedicated to the memory of Hô Chi Minh, the first President of the Democratic Republic of Vietnam, for his fight against colonialism.

The institution publishes or co-produces historical works, exhibition catalogues, postcards and documentary films. It is also a place of archival resources for researchers and historians.

Its pedagogical activity has intensified, and it works in partnership with the association "Citoyenneté Jeunesse" to present teachers and their students with various pedagogical workshops. Modules of images introduce students (primary to secondary school) to different themes: the French Revolution, colonial imagery, the image and representation of women, urban habitat and garden cities, large complexes, discovery and liberation of Nazi camps, and propaganda imagery, among other themes.
