= Fortuna (album) =

2019 studio album by Emma

Studio album by Emma
- Released: 25 October 2019
- Recorded: 2019
- Studio: Speakeasy Studio, Los Angeles
- Genre: Pop rock
- Length: 47:58
- Label: Universal; Polydor
- Producer: Dardust; Luca Mattioni; Elisa Toffoli; Frenetik & Orang3

Emma chronology
Essere qui (2018)	Fortuna (2019)	Souvenir (2023)

Singles from Fortuna
- 1. "Io sono bella" Released: 6 September 2019; 2. "Stupida allegria" Released: 6 December 2019; 3. "Luci blu" Released: 6 March 2020; 4. "Latina" Released: 28 August 2020

Fortuna is the sixth studio album by Italian singer-songwriter Emma, released by Universal Music Italy and Polydor Records on 25 October 2019.

The album featured several writers and producers, including Vasco Rossi, Elisa Toffoli, Franco126 and Dario Faini.

It peaked at number one on the Italian Albums Chart, becoming her third number album to achieve it since Schiena (2013).

== Background ==
After the completion of the Essere qui tour in March 2019, Emma travelled to Los Angeles to begin work on her next album. Describing the process, she said "I took my time, I experienced abroad and I opened my mind in a metropolis that is not your home", adding that this helped her understand who she is and what she wanted to do.

== Composition and lyrical content ==
In an interview, Emma said that Fortuna represented who she is now: a serene, continuously changing person projected towards the future. One of the album's most prominent themes is positivity, with the title track focusing on viewing things positively and the importance of trying, whether you succeed or not.

The album calls upon a variety of musical influences, with an array of producers and writers, including Dario Faini, Franco126, Elisa Toffoli, Andrea Rigonat, Vasco Rossi, Giovanni Caccamo|and Lorenzo Vizzini. Emma is credited as a co-writer on three of the album's tracks: "Fortuna", "Alibi" and "Dimmelo veramente", the latter of which focuses on modern-day emotions and the anxiety that social media causes.

== Singles ==
On 6 September 2019, Emma released "Io sono bella" as Fortuna's lead single, written by Vasco Rossi, Gaetano Curreri, Gerardo Pulli and Piero Romitelli, and produced by Dardust. The second single "Stupida allegria" was published on 6 December 2019; the song was also released in collaboration with Izi and was certified gold by FIMI.

== Release and promotion ==
On 16 October 2019, Emma announced that her sixth solo studio album Fortuna would be released on 25 October 2019, via a video on her social media accounts. In addition to the album's title and release date, Emma revealed the cover and announced a concert on 25 May 2020, her birthday, at the Arena di Verona, to celebrate Fortuna and ten years of her solo music career. Of the album cover, Emma said that she wanted a cover that fit with the album's sound and lyrics, and that "it shows a woman who can be anything she wants, the important thing is what you can't see".

On 17 October, Emma revealed the album's track listing. Fortuna was made available to pre-order on iTunes the following day.

Following its release on 25 October, Fortuna debuted atop the Italian album chart, becoming her first album to top the chart since 2013's Schiena.

== Critical reception ==
Professional ratings
Review scores
Source	Rating
All Music Italia	8.5/10 stars
Newsic	7.5/10 stars
Rockol	3.5/5 stars

Fortuna received positive reviews from music critics. Writing for All Music Italia, Fabio Fiume praised the album as "Emma's most beautiful yet", for establishing her artistic maturity. He also highlighted Dardust's production, writing that "he is capable of turning everything that glitters into gold". Concluding his review, Fiume wrote "Emma has definitively transformed herself into the queen of our contemporary pop and giving her that place is not an exaggeration; her throne rests on real credibility in whatever she does". In their review, Rockol commended Fortuna's variety, with Emma's traditional ballads: "Luci blu", "I grandi progetti" and "A mano disarmata", rock songs: "Io sono bella", "Mascara" and "Fortuna", as well as a new sound, highlighting "Stupida allegria"'s rap-like stanzas. Writing for Newsic, Elena Rebecca Odelli also mentioned the album's new sound for Emma, calling Fortuna "a record that opens Marrone to a new era". Odelli chose "Stupida allegria", "Luci blu" and "A mano disarmata" as her recommended tracks.

== Track listing ==
Fortuna – Standard track listing
No.	Title	Lyrics	Music	Producer(s)	Length
1.	"Fortuna"	Emma Marrone	Dario Faini; Vanni Casagrande	Dardust	2:59
2.	"Io sono bella"	Vasco Rossi	Gaetano Curreri; Gerardo Pulli; Piero Romitelli	Dardust	3:04
3.	"Stupida allegria"	Federico Bertollini; Giovanni De Cataldo; Faini	Bertollini; De Cataldo; Faini	Dardust	3:18
4.	"Luci blu"	Simone Cremonini; Davide Simonetta	Cremonini; Simonetta	Dardust	3:12
5.	"Quando l'amore finisce"	Maurizio Carucci	Carucci; Faini	Dardust	3:34
6.	"Alibi"	Marrone	Faini; Casagrande	Dardust	3:42
7.	"Mascara"	Elisa Toffoli; Davide Petrella	Toffoli; Faini	Elisa	3:34
8.	"I grandi progetti"	Faini; Diego Mancino	Faini; Mancino	Dardust	3:29
9.	"Manifesto"	Giulia Anania; Marta Venturini	Anania; Venturini	Luca Mattioni	3:41
10.	"Succede che"	Alex Andrea Germanò	Francesco Catitti	Dardust	3:39
11.	"Dimmelo veramente"	Marrone; Antonio Di Martino; Gianclaudia Franchini	Di Martino; Daniele Dezi; Daniele Mungai	Frenetik & Orang3	3:17
12.	"Corri"	Daniele Magro	Magro	Mattioni	3:43
13.	"Basti solo tu"	Erika Mineo; Antonio Maggio	Antonio Maggio	Mattioni	3:10
14.	"A mano disarmata"	Giovanni Caccamo; Lorenzo Vizzini	Vizzini	Mattioni	4:36
Total length:					47:58

Fortuna – Digital reissue bonus tracks
No.	Title	Lyrics	Music	Producer(s)	Length
15.	"Stupida allegria" (featuring Izi)	Bertollini; De Cataldo; Faini; Diego Germini	Bertollini; De Cataldo; Faini	Dardust	3:30
16.	"Latina"	Edoardo D'Erme; Petrella; Faini	D'Erme; Petrella; Faini	Dardust	3:23

== Personnel ==
Credits from All Music Italia.

Production

- Dario Faini (as Dardust) – producer (tracks 1–6, 8, 10)
- Luca Mattoni – producer (tracks 9, 12–14)
- Elisa Toffoli – producer (track 7)
- Frenetik & Orang3 – producer (track 11)

Vocals

- Emma Marrone – lead vocals

Technical

- Marco Sonzini at Speakeasy Studios, Los Angeles – mixing (tracks 1, 4–6, 8, 10 and 11)
- Pino Pischetola at Pinaxa Studio, Milan – mixing (tracks 2 and 3)
- Luca Vittori at Villaggio Studio, Milan – mixing (tracks 9, 12, 13 and 14)
- Andrea Rigonat at Zingarelle Studio, Ugento – mixing (track 9)
- Reuben Cohen at Lurssen Mastering, Burbank – mastering

Art

- Emilio Tini – art direction
- Paolo De Francesco for MoltiMedia – cover art

== Charts ==
Chart (2019)	Peak position
Italian Albums (FIMI)	1
Swiss Albums (Schweizer Hitparade)	35

== Certifications ==
Certifications for Fortuna
Region	Certification	Certified units/sales
Italy (FIMI)	Gold	25,000^{‡}
^{‡} Sales+streaming figures based on certification alone.

== Release history ==
Region	Date	Version	Format(s)	Label
Various (Note: Excluding United Kingdom, Ireland, United States and China)	25 October 2019	Standard	Digital download; streaming	Universal Music Italy; Polydor
Spain and Italy	25 October 2019	Standard	CD	Universal Music Italy; Polydor
Italy	25 October 2019	Standard	Vinyl	Universal Music Italy; Polydor
Worldwide	November 2019	Standard	Digital download; streaming	Universal Music Italy; Polydor
Europe	November 2019	Standard	CD; Vinyl	Universal Music Italy; Polydor
Italy	16 December 2019	Christmas Edition	CD	Universal Music Italy; Polydor
