= Modena Park 2017 =

Music concert by Italian singer, Vasco Rossi

- Rock concert by Vasco Rossi
- Venue: Enzo Ferrari Park, Modena, Italy
- Date: 1 July 2017
- Duration: 3:38:36
- No. of shows: 1
- Attendance: 225,173
- Box office: €12,000,000

Modena Park 2017 was a concert performed by Italian rock singer Vasco Rossi on 1 July 2017 in Modena, Italy, to celebrate his 40 years of musical activity. Held at Enzo Ferrari Park, at the time the event broke the world record for the most successful ticketed concert, with a total of 225,173 tickets sold (including 5,000 free tickets).

== History ==
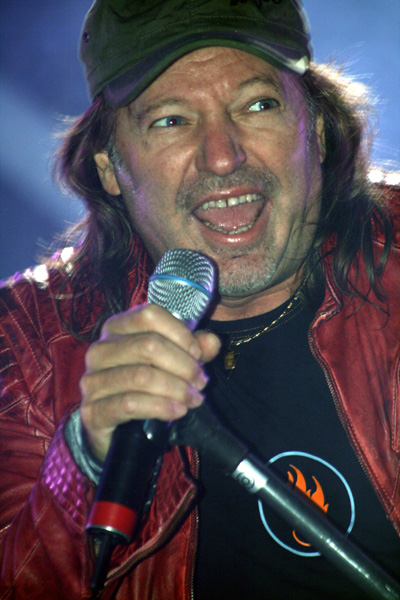
Vasco Rossi in 2007

Io The last concert performed by Vasco in Modena dates back to 22 September 2001 during the Festa nazionale de l'Unità, on his Stupido Hotel tour.

On 19 April 2016, Vasco announced the organization of a concert in Modena, the city where he began his 40-year career as a DJ and singer. Initially, the event was to be called Modena... Modena park tutto ritorna (Modena... Modena Park everything comes back), in reference to lyrics of his song Colpa d'Alfredo (Alfredo's fault), in which a girl asks Vasco, "Mi puoi portare a casa questa sera? Abito fuori Modena, Modena park" ("Can you bring me home tonight? I'm living out of Modena... Modena Park"), but then she goes out with another man "who does not even speak Italian well, but – you see – he is well understood whenever he wants".

On 25 January 2017 ticket sales were opened to fan club members, who bought 33,112 tickets in 48 hours, and then two days later to the general public. On 27 January alone 150,000 tickets were sold in 10 hours, and at 8:13 PM Vasco announced on Twitter that he "Pulverized the European record!" The final block of 25,000 tickets was put on sale on 23 May, selling out within three hours.

== Program ==
The concert began at 9:00 PM and included 40 songs by Vasco (one for each year of his career). The event ended after three and a half hours and concluded with the 1979 single Albachiara and a fireworks show.

Program:

1. Opening intro: Also sprach Zarathustra by Richard Strauss
2. Colpa d'Alfredo
3. Alibi
4. Blasco Rossi
5. Bollicine
6. Ogni volta
7. Anima fragile (with Gaetano Curreri)
8. Jenny
9. Silvia
10. La nostra relazione
11. Splendida giornata
12. Ieri ho sgozzato mio figlio
13. Rock medley: Delusa/T'immagini/Mi piaci perché/Gioca con me/Stasera!/Sono ancora in coma/Rock'n'roll Show
14. Ultimo domicilio conosciuto (with Maurizio Solieri)
15. Vivere una favola
16. Non mi va
17. Cosa vuoi da me
18. Siamo soli
19. Come nelle favole
20. Vivere
21. Sono innocente ma...
22. Rewind
23. Liberi liberi
24. Interludio 2017 (with Andrea Braido)
25. Ed il tempo crea eroi
26. Acoustic medley: Una canzone per te/L'una per te/Ridere di te/Va bene, va bene così
27. Senza parole
28. ...stupendo
29. Gli spari sopra
30. Sballi ravvicinati del terzo tipo
31. C'è chi dice no
32. Un mondo migliore
33. I soliti
34. Sally
35. Un senso
36. Siamo solo noi
  1. Band presentation by Diego Spagnoli
37. Vita spericolata
38. Canzone – dedicated to guitarist Massimo Riva (1963–1999)
39. Albachiara (with Andrea Braido, Gaetano Curreri, and Maurizio Solieri)
40. Closing credits: Die for Metal by Manowar

== Band ==
- Vasco Rossi – vocals
- Stef Burns – electric guitar
- Claudio Golinelli – bass guitar
- Andrea Innesto – choir
- Matt Laug – drums
- Clara Moroni – choir
- Frank Nemola – trumpet, keyboard
- Vince Pastano – guitar
- Alberto Rocchetti – keyboard
- Diego Spagnoli – band presenter
- Andrea Braido – guitar (guest)
- Gaetano Curreri – piano (guest)
- Maurizio Solieri – guitar (guest)

== Staging ==
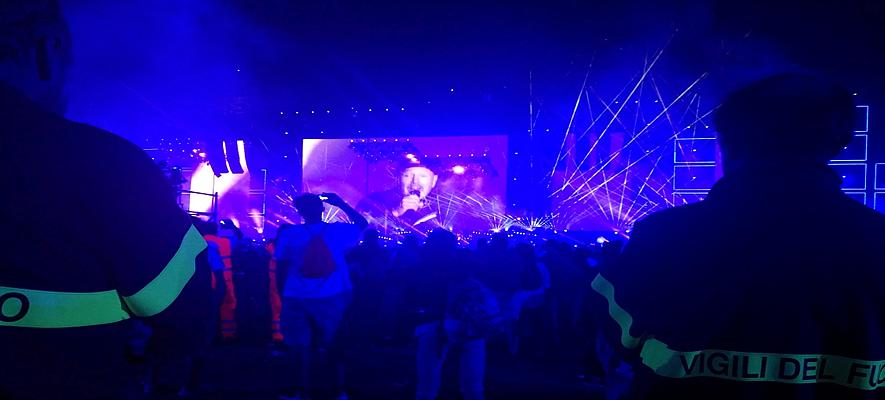
A moment of the concert

The stage at Enzo Ferrari park was 165 metres (541 ft) long and stood 8 metres (26 ft) off the ground. It featured five large video screens with a total area of 1,500 square metres (16,000 sq ft). Four of these were set on tracks, so that they could move sideways depending on the video scenography required during each song. The remaining four screens, two per side, were installed within PIT 3. Special effects were produced by 2,100 light points and 140 lasers. Transportation of all the staging equipment required a total of 136 semi-trailer trucks.

The sound was played through a 750,000-watt L-Acoustics audio system consisting of 900 speaker modules connected by 100 kilometres (62 mi) of fiber-optic cables, with 29 sound towers to allow all 230,000 viewers along a 400-metre (1,300 ft)-long lawn to listen without return or echo effects. According to production staff, one megawatt of energy was consumed during the concert. The two main towers located in front of the stage, each containing 80 speaker modules, were suspended using two-ton cranes for each tower.

== Audience ==
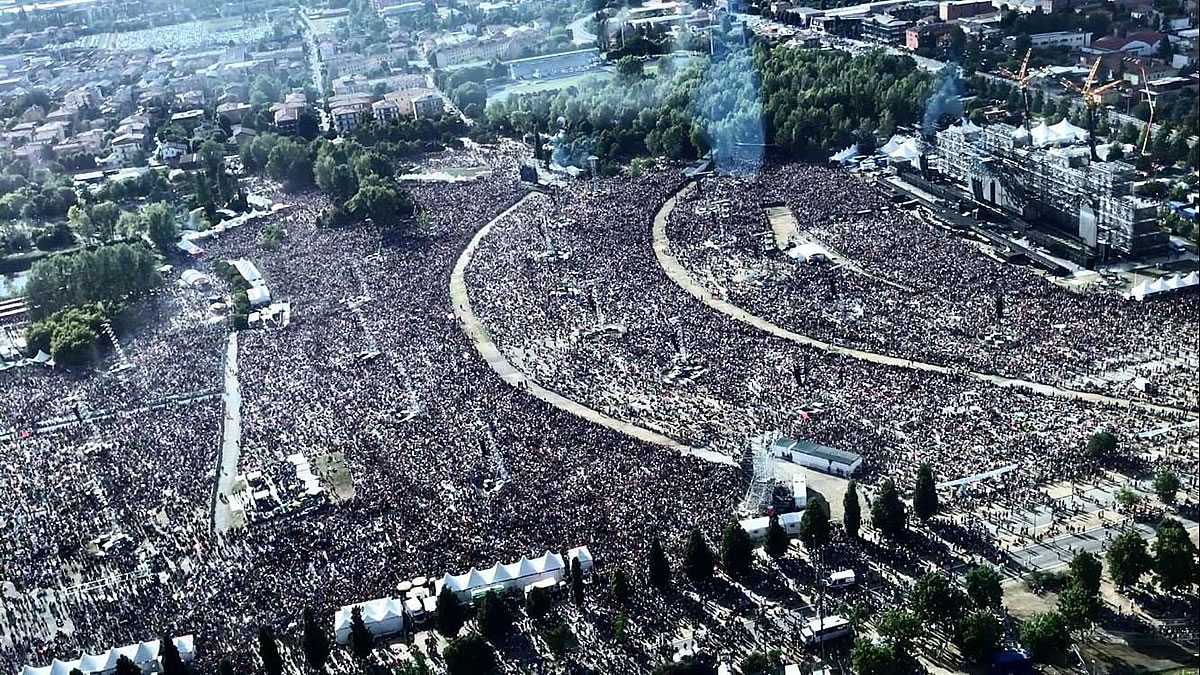
Audience at Modena Park 2017

Over 220,000 tickets to the concert were sold, beating the previous world record of 198,000 paying attendees at the a-Ha concert at the Rock in Rio 2 festival on 26 January 1991. The arena was split into three areas: Pits 1 and 2 accommodated 30,000 attendees each, and Pit 3 seated the remainder. The areas were marked with different colours (red, blue, and green), and with different ticket prices (€75, €65, and €50, pre-sale fees and commissions excluded). The total gross for the concert was about €12 million (US$13.7 million), while the economic impact on the city was estimated at €6 million.

Gate opening was initially scheduled for 09:00 on 1 July. However, considering the crowd that had arrived on the previous day, the police ordered the gates opened at 21:00 on 30 June, twenty-four hours before the concert began. One fan from Pordenone began camping in Modena on 29 May, a full month prior, in order to be the first person to enter the park.

== Logistics ==
The national railroad company Trenitalia scheduled three special long-distance trains to depart from Rome, Turin/Milan, and Venice to the Modena railway station. After the concert, more than 35 trains were scheduled to depart. It was estimated that about 35,000 people reached Modena by train.

== Broadcasting ==
The concert was broadcast live under the title Vasco Modena Park 01.07.17 – Live. Directed by Giuseppe Domingo Romano credited as Pepsy Romanoff, it was shown in 197 movie theaters in Italy and three sports venues (Genoa, Padua, and Rome). The concert was followed by official radio re-broadcasts on Radio Dimensione Suono and Radio Italia (at the national level), and Radio Bruno (at the local level). National television company RAI, unable to acquire the broadcasting rights for all the songs, aired on Eurovision on Rai 1 and Rai 1 HD the special program La notte di Vasco ("Vasco's night") by Paolo Bonolis, in addition to the programming of Rai Radio 2.

TV audience in Italy	TV viewers	Share	Ref
TV audience in Italy	5,633,000	36,14%	

== Vasco Modena Park - Il film ==
Pepsy Romanoff announced that the filming of the concert would be remastered in a live action film to be shown in Italian theaters at the beginning of December 2017 during the Christmas season, while the release of the DVD was scheduled for March–April 2018. For reasons of length (the documentary lasts 157 minutes, while the Modena concert was 3 and a half hours), several songs have been cut. In the five days of programming, the documentary was watched by 49,409 spectators and grossed €687,435, which exceeded the total revenue of the nine most scheduled films on the same day in Italy, and reached second place on the weekly chart of the most popular shows of the week. Afterwards, box office revenues rose to €743,153, between USD$848,058 and USD$849,124, against an estimated production budget of €500,000.

== See also ==
- List of highest-attended concerts
