= Io sono bella =

Single by Emma

from the album Fortuna
- Language: Italian
- Released: 6 September 2019
- Studio: Los Angeles (Speakeasy)
- Genre: Rock
- Length: 3:03
- Label: Universal; Polydor
- Songwriters: Vasco Rossi; Gaetano Curreri; Piero Romitelli; Gerardo Pulli
- Producer: Dardust

Emma singles chronology
"Mondiale" (2018)	"Io sono bella" (2019)	"Stupida allegria" (2019)

Music video
- "Io sono bella" on YouTube

"Io sono bella" is a song recorded by Italian singer Emma. It was released on 6 September 2019 through Universal Music Italy and Polydor Records, as the lead single from her sixth studio album Fortuna. The song was written by Vasco Rossi and produced by Dardust.

== Composition ==
The song, written by Vasco Rossi, Gaetano Curreri, Piero Romitelli, and Gerardo Pulli, marks Marrone's return to the music scene on the occasion of her 10-year career. Vasco Rossi recounted the choice to write for Emma and the meaning of the song:

"I wrote for Emma what I would sing if I were Emma. It's a provocative and defiant lyric about what today's girls are like. The music is of course by Gaetano Curreri, who knows me well and always manages to compose the music that goes on the lyrics of our 'female' songs for female singers"

Emma reported on how she received Vasco Rossi's song and her esteem for him, as well as the cover chosen for the single, shot by Emilio Tini:

"After 10 years of work it is the greatest reward I could have received. I think back to all the records I bought and all the concerts where I jumped around like crazy singing his songs with all the voice I had in my body to be heard by the kom. Because I wanted to become like him. You have no idea what it means to me to have his words in my mouth. And so I smile! Always looking down, like in the cover photo, to hide the tears even if they are tears of joy. And I enjoy it, yes, I enjoy it very much."

== Reception ==
Fabio Fiume of All Music Italia wrote that Emma is "perhaps the current female character missing from the parterre of singers suited to give voice to the thoughts of such a songwriter, and paradoxically she is the one who is closest today" to Vasco Rossi's musical style, reporting that "Emma is here Vasco, Vasco is here Emma." The journalist wrote that the song carries with it an "important message," interpreted by the singer with "just the right sensual aftertaste" and with "a healthy meekness," aided by "guitars that manage the rhythm, a few forays 80 of keyboards in the aside and vocal doubles to reinforce the message." Mary Adorno of Cosmopolitan Italia affirmed that "you can feel all of Vasco Rossi's presence" although it is perceived that the two artists "have joined forces." In the lyrics she highlighted that the opening with "enjoy" is "a must that has stuck to your ears since Rewind," becoming in the song "a cry for self-esteem."

Giovanni Ferrari of Billboard Italia found that the song's message is what stands out the most, which is to invite "everyone to simply be okay with themselves," as "Emma has shown us that being an artist also means having the chance to expose yourself." Ferrari also wrote that the singer "fully embraces her more aggressive spirit, but, in doing so, she lays herself bare with tenderness," likening it to Dolcenera's singing style. Claudia Fascia of Agenzia ANSA described the song as "rhythmic and gritty," in which Vasco "sewed on her indomitable soul a song that represents the Emma of today: a determined, courageous woman who is free to be herself." In the lyrics she found "a few rhymes are a bit too obvious," but which nevertheless "are just right to get into the head and stay there.

In a negative review, Simona Voglino Levy of Rolling Stone Italia, he wrote that the lyrics come across as "trite" in which "the Vaschian imprint is repetitive. Vasco is sensed, but not heard. One recognizes just the usual spiel." On the arrangement she wrote that it "leaves one perplexed," reporting "the electronics are overbearing and seem to swallow everything" in Dardust's production, while the guitars come across as "overused." However, the journalist appreciated Emma's "scratchy, full, powerful" vocals, which "always satisfy." Claudio Fabretti of Il Mattino also remained less impressed with the song, warning that in addition to the "usual pseudo-rock energy" and the "more studied than wild" interpretation, there remained "a boldy, banal refrain, sealing a lyric that already starts out as the most predictable of sexy monologues."

== Music video ==
The music video for the song, directed by Paolo Mannarino, was released on September 9, 2019, through the singer's YouTube channel. It incorporates various references to 1980s graphics, as well as presenting a clear homage to the film American Beauty: the singer, in fact, recreates the iconic scene in which actress Mena Suvari is without veils and covered only by rose petals. The director explained the meaning of the visual:

"in the video sets out to humorously represent the 1,000 shades that can be hidden behind any woman. From the grit of the girl in the leather stud, to the fragility of the one in tears in the rain to the typical charm of the femme fatale or the iconic Barbie."

== Charts ==
Chart (2019)	Peak position
Italy (FIMI)	33
Italy Airplay (EarOne)	1
San Marino (SMRRTV Top 50)	3
