= Stupido hotel =

Studio album by Vasco Rossi
- Released: 6 April 2001
- Genre: Pop; pop rock
- Length: 39:52
- Label: EMI
- Producer: Guido Elmi

Vasco Rossi chronology
Rewind (1999)	Stupido hotel (2001)	Tracks (2002)

Singles from Stupido hotel
- 1. "Siamo soli" Released: 2 April 2001; 2. "Ti prendo e ti porto via" Released: 2001; 3. "Stupido hotel" Released: 2001; 4. "Io ti accontento" Released: 2002; 5. "Tu vuoi da me qualcosa" Released: 2002

Stupido hotel is the thirteenth studio album by Italian singer-songwriter Vasco Rossi, released on 6 April 2001. It was preceded by the single "Siamo soli". The album was produced by Guido Elmi.

== Track listing ==
No.	Title	Writer(s)	Length
1.	"Siamo soli"	Vasco Rossi; Tullio Ferro; Guido Elmi	4:01
2.	"Ti prendo e ti porto via"	Gaetano Curreri; Saverio Grandi; Rossi	4:10
3.	"Standing ovation"	Rossi; Elmi; Stefano Bittelli	4:55
4.	"Stupido hotel"	Ferro; Elmi; Rossi	4:22
5.	"Io ti accontento"	Rossi; Elmi; Alessandro Mingozzi	3:48
6.	"Perché non piangi per me"	Elmi; Massimo Riva; Rossi	4:00
7.	"Tu vuoi da me qualcosa"	Rossi; Bittelli	4:24
8.	"Stendimi"	Ferro; Rossi	3:22
9.	"Quel vestito semplice"	Rossi; Elmi; Curreri; Gianni Novi	3:14
10.	"Canzone generale"	Vasco Rossi	3:31

== Charts ==
=== Weekly charts ===
Chart (2001)	Peak position
Italian Albums (FIMI)	1
Swiss Albums (Schweizer Hitparade)	11

=== Year-end charts ===
Chart (2001)	Position
Italy (FIMI)	1

== Certifications and sales ==
Region	Certification	Certified units/sales
Italy	—	700,000
Switzerland (IFPI Switzerland)	Gold	20,000^{^}
^{^} Shipments figures based on certification alone.
