= Fronte del Palco =

Live album by Vasco Rossi
- Released: 14 May 1990
- Recorded: 18–19 June 1989
- Venue: Arena Civica, Milan
- Studio: Fonoprint Studio Mobile, Bologna (mixing, engineering)
- Genre: Rock; pop rock
- Length: 1:35:01
- Language: Italian
- Label: EMI Italiana
- Producer: Stephen Hart; Vasco Rossi

Fronte del Palco (lit. "Stagefront") is a live album by Italian rock singer-songwriter Vasco Rossi, released by EMI Italiana in May 1990.

== Description ==
The artist's second live release after Va bene, va bene così (1984), Fronte del Palco records two shows held at Milan's Arena Civica on 18 and 19 June 1989, during the artist's "Blasco Tour". It contains eighteen tracks, the last of which ("Guarda Dove Vai") previously unreleased. The album was promoted with an Italian tour during 1990 and 1991, the "Fronte del Palco Tour".

This latter tour was documented by a VHS release, Fronte del Palco Live 90 (1991), containing two shows by Vasco Rossi held at the San Siro (Milan) and Flaminio (Rome) stadiums (on 10 and 14 July 1990 respectively), being Rossi's first two shows in Italian stadiums.

The album entered the Italian weekly chart, peaking at No. 1, in 1990, and re-entered it in 2003, peaking at No. 36. It was certified double Platinum by the Federazione Industria Musicale Italiana (FIMI) in early 1991.

== Track listing ==
All tracks are written by Vasco Rossi, except where noted.

Side one
No.	Title	Writer(s)	Original release	Length
1.	"...Muoviti!"		Liberi Liberi (1989)	8:05
2.	""Blasco" Rossi"		C'è Chi Dice No (1987)	4:43
3.	"C'è Chi Dice No"	Rossi • Maurizio Solieri	C'è Chi Dice No (1987)	5:30
4.	"Dillo alla Luna"		Liberi Liberi (1989)	5:16
5.	"Tango (della Gelosia)"		Liberi Liberi (1989)	3:36
6.	"Deviazioni"		Bollicine (1983)	3:28
7.	"Ogni Volta"		Vado al Massimo (1982)	4:41
8.	"Ridere di Te"	Rossi • Solieri	C'è Chi Dice No (1987)	5:54
9.	"...Lunedì"		C'è Chi Dice No (1987)	4:54
Total length:				46:07

Side two
No.	Title	Writer(s)	Original release	Length
10.	"Vivere una favola"	Rossi • Massimo Riva • Guido Elmi	C'è Chi Dice No (1987)	7:48
11.	"Vita Spericolata"	Rossi (L) • Tullio Ferro (M)	Bollicine (1983)	5:38
12.	"Liberi... Liberi"	Rossi (L) • Ferro (M)	Liberi Liberi (1989)	7:33
13.	"Vivere senza Te"	Rossi • Ferro • Rudy Trevisi • Daniela Grifoni	Liberi Liberi (1989)	4:42
14.	"Domenica Lunatica"		Liberi Liberi (1989)	4:02
15.	"Siamo Solo Noi"		Siamo Solo Noi (1981)	6:15
16.	"Canzone"	Rossi • Solieri	Vado al Massimo (1982)	2:07
17.	"Albachiara"		Non siamo mica gli Americani! (1979)	5:11
18.	"Guarda Dove Vai"		Previously unreleased	5:38
Total length:				48:54

== Personnel ==
- Vasco Rossi – lead vocals
- Daniele Tedeschi – drums
- Paul Martinez – bass guitar
- Alberto Rochetti – keyboards; backing vocals
- Davide Devoti – rhythm guitars
- Andrea Braido – lead guitars
- Andrea Innesto – backing vocals; saxophone

=== Guest ===
- Rudy Trevisi – saxophone (tracks 4 and 12)

=== Production ===
- Alessandra Callari – cover art
- Alfiero Massimini – editor; mixing (assistant); recording (assistant)
- Bruno Marzi – photographer
- Floriano Fini – production coordinator
- Leo Monti – engineer (additional)
- Luca Testoni – recording (supervisor)
- Marti Jane Robertson – engineer (additional)
- Maurizio Lolli – management
- Maurizio Viola – photographer
- Natale Chirulli – photographer
- Sandro Franchini – engineer (additional); mixing
- Serse May – engineer
- Stephen Hart – digital assembling; mixing; producer
- Terry Balls – executive producer
- Vasco Rossi – producer

== Charts ==
=== Weekly charts ===
Chart (1990)	Peak position
Italy	1

Chart (2003)	Peak position
Italy	36

=== Year-end charts ===
Chart (1990)	Position
Italy	10
