= Stupida allegria =

Single by Emma

from the album Fortuna
- Language: Italian
- Released: 6 December 2019
- Studio: Los Angeles (Speakeasy)
- Genre: Folk-pop
- Length: 3:30
- Label: Universal; Polydor
- Songwriters: Federico Bertollini; Giovanni De Cataldo; Dario Faini
- Producers: Franco126; Dardust

Emma singles chronology
"Io sono bella" (2019)	"Stupida allegria" (2019)	"Luci blu" (2019)

Music video
- "Stupida allegria" on YouTube

"Stupida allegria" is a song recorded by Italian singer Emma. It was released on 6 December 2019 through Universal Music Italy and Polydor Records, as the second single from her sixth studio album Fortuna.

The song was re-released in a remixed version featuring guest vocals by Italian rapper Izi on 10 January 2020.

== Composition ==
Written by Giovanni De Cataldo, Franco126 and Dardust (the latters also producers), the song tells of a melancholic and tormented love. Marrone explained the meaning of the song and its writing process:

"With Franco it was born out of an evening in Milan, we met by chance, had a couple of Gin Tonics, started talking, getting to know each other, almost throwing up thoughts at each other, the feelings we have for Rome, for our lives, for love, for beauty, and the next day he wrote Stupida allegria. It's not a piece that came out of a record cobbler, out of a label request, but out of the fact that we met and found each other and so with all the other writers. I always start from the person and then get to the music: this record is made of experiences, it is the sum of everything I have done before and everything I hope to do in the future"

== Promotion and release ==
The singer sang "Stupida allegria" as the opening song of one of her medleys during the first night of the Sanremo Music Festival 2020. She also performed the single at Amici di Maria De Filippi on February 28, 2020, as a duet with contestant and winner Gaia.

On January 10, 2020, a new version of the single featuring the vocal participation of rapper Izi was released with new lyrics.

== Critics reception ==
Fabio Fiume of All Music Italia praised the work of the team of producers and composers, writing that the song "puts together an arrangement somewhere between pop and stornello and well balances the cheerfulness of the title with the melancholy that is often cement to even the most frayed relationships." Giulia Crivelli of TV Sorrisi e Canzoni wrote that the song is composed of "a good rhythm, engaging and catchy" with "a rap tinge that brings out the singer's rougher side."

Francesco Raiola of Fanpage.it found that "the singer changes the playing field and does so with lyrics that reflect her more alternative soul. A song with less radio impact, perhaps, but undoubtedly one of the most successful and interesting on the album." The journalist also wrote that the track has "a more singer-songwriterap trend and with a very Mediterranean feeling."

== Music video ==
The music video for the song, directed by Attilio Cusani, was released on December 19, 2019, through the singer's YouTube channel. The video was held in Marrakesh, Morocco.

== Charts ==
Chart (2019)	Peak position
Italy (FIMI)	42
Italy (Airplay)	2

== Certifications ==
Region	Certification	Certified units/sales
Italy (FIMI)	Gold	35,000^{‡}
^{‡} Sales+streaming figures based on certification alone.
