= Marco Santagata =

Italian academic and writer (1947–2020)

- Born: 28 April 1947; Zocca, Italy
- Died: 9 November 2020 (aged 73); Pisa, Italy
- Resting place: Cimitero di Zocca
- Occupations: Academic; Writer

Marco Santagata (28 April 1947 – 9 November 2020) was an Italian academic, writer, and literary critic.

== Biography ==
Santagata studied classical literature at the University of Pisa and the Scuola Normale Superiore di Pisa, where he graduated in 1970. He became a professor of literature at Ca' Foscari University of Venice before returning to his alma mater, the University of Pisa, in 1984 as a professor of philology, literature, and linguistics. He was one of the most important Italian specialists of Dante Alighieri, Giovanni Boccaccio and Petrarch.

Marco Santagata died in Pisa on 9 November 2020, at the age of 73, after contracting COVID-19 amid the ongoing pandemic in Italy.

== Works ==
=== Novels ===
- Papà non era comunista (1996)
- Il copista (2000)
- Il maestro dei santi pallidi (2002)
- L'amore in sé (2006)
- Il salto degli Orlandi (2007)
- Voglio una vita come la mia (2008)
- Come donna innamorata (2015)
- Il movente è sconosciuto (2018)

=== Essays ===
- Petrarca e i Colonna (1988)
- Amate e amanti. Figure della lirica amorosa fra Dante e Petrarca (1999)
- La letteratura nei secoli della tradizione. Dalla Chanson de Roland a Foscolo (2007)
- Manuale di letteratura italiana contemporanea (2007)
- L'io e il mondo. Un'interpretazione di Dante (2011)
- Dante. Il romanzo della sua vita (2012), (Dante, The Story of His Life, trans. Richard Dixon, 2016)
- Guida all'Inferno (2013)
- L'amoroso pensiero. Petrarca e il romanzo di Laura (2014)
- Pastorale modenese. Boiardo, i poeti e la lotta politica (2016)
- Il racconto della Commedia. Guida al poema di Dante (2017)
- Il poeta innamorato. Su Dante, Petrarca e la poesia amorosa medievale (2017)
- Boccaccio. Fragilità di un genio (2019)
- Le donne di Dante (2021)

== Awards ==
- Premio Campiello for Il maestro dei santi pallidi (2003)
- Premio Stresa for L'amore in sé (2006)
- Premio Comisso for Dante. Il romanzo della sua vita (2013)
