= Il mondo che vorrei =

Studio album by Vasco Rossi
- Released: 28 March 2008
- Studios: Fonoprint, Bologna; Henson Recording Studio, Hollywood; Open Digital Studio, Bologna; Studio Impatto, Bologna
- Genre: Pop rock
- Length: 50:43
- Label: EMI Italiana
- Producer: Celso Valli • Guido Elmi • Vasco Rossi

Vasco Rossi chronology
Vasco Extended Play (2007)	Il mondo che vorrei (2008)	Tracks 2 – Inediti & rarità (2009)

Singles from Il mondo che vorrei
- 1. "Basta poco" Released: 19 January 2007; 2. "Il mondo che vorrei" Released: 14 March 2008; 3. "Gioca con me" Released: 13 June 2008; 4. "E adesso che tocca a me" Released: 12 September 2008; 5. "Vieni qui" Released: 16 January 2009; 6. "Colpa del whisky" Released: 15 May 2009

Il mondo che vorrei (lit. 'The World I Would Like') is the fifteenth studio album by Italian rock singer-songwriter Vasco Rossi, released in 2008 by EMI Italiana.

== Description ==
The album was anticipated by "Basta poco" in early 2007, originally included in the Vasco Extended Play EP, and supported by a videoclip starring Piernitro, a puppet drawn by Rossi's son Luca Rossi. It was the first Italian song exclusively released through the internet, selling 50 000 digital downloads in three days and reaching No. 1 in Italian charts. A limited-5 000 copies LP was printed. The song lyrics deal with hypocrisy of politicians and entertainment.

The song "Non sopporto", though not officially a single, was premiered during the Vasco Live 2007 tour.

"Il mondo che vorrei" — both the album's title track and proper lead single — was inspired by "the worst reality that mortifies one's aspirations and does not limit suffering", and the necessity felt by Rossi, as an artist, to rebel against it. On the occasion of Rossi's show at the Concerto del Primo Maggio festival in 2008, a fundraising campaign was launched and named after the song, to support victims at work. "Vieni qui" is a love song; its videoclip was inspired by a newly-wed couple who once attended a show by Rossi immediately after the ceremony.

"Gioca con me" is a hard rock song dealing with sex, and features a guitar solo by Slash. It was the album's second single and was released in no less than seven remixed versions, including a dance version that became popular in nightclubs.

Among other guests, Dean Parks, Tim Pierce and Michael Landau recorded guitar parts for the album – the latter, most notably, providing the extended guitar solo on "Il mondo che vorrei". Leland Sklar recorded bass guitar for two tracks, including the sixth single "Colpa del whisky"; and Tony Franklyn for other three, including the third single "Gioca con me". Vinnie Colaiuta recorded drums on seven tracks including the title track and singles "Vieni qui" and "Colpa del whisky". Stef Burns, longtime-serving guitarist for Rossi, recorded the guitar solos for "Qui si fa la storia" and "Basta poco".

== Track listing ==
All lyrics are written by Vasco Rossi except "Colpa del whisky", by Roberto Casini and Rossi.

No.	Title	Music	Producer(s)	Length
1.	"Il mondo che vorrei"	Tullio Ferro	Guido Elmi • Rossi	6:00
2.	"Vieni qui"	Ferro	Elmi • Rossi	4:45
3.	"Gioca con me" (feat. Slash)	Guido Elmi • Ferro	Elmi • Rossi	3:46
4.	"E adesso che tocca a me"	Andrea Fornilli • Gaetano Curreri	Celso Valli • Rossi	3:58
5.	"Dimmelo te"	Elmi • Ferro	Elmi • Rossi	4:34
6.	"Cosa importa a me"	Elmi • Ferro	Elmi • Rossi	3:28
7.	"Non vivo senza te"	Curreri • Saverio Grandi • Rossi	Valli • Rossi	4:10
8.	"Qui si fa la storia"	Elmi • Ferro	Elmi • Rossi	3:41
9.	"Colpa del whisky"	Casini • Rossi	Elmi • Rossi	4:12
10.	"Non sopporto"	Rossi	Elmi • Rossi	3:24
11.	"Ho bisogno di te"	Rossi	Elmi • Rossi	4:04
12.	"Basta poco"	Rossi	Elmi • Rossi	4:32
Total length:				50:43

== Personnel ==
=== Musicians ===
- Vasco Rossi – lead vocals (all tracks)
- Dean Parks – acoustic guitar (tracks 1, 2); solo guitar (track 9)
- Guido Elmi – guitar; arrangements; harpsichord (tracks 1, 2)
- Tim Pierce – rhythm guitar (tracks 1, 5–6, 8, 10); solo guitar (track 2)
- Michael Landau – solo guitar (track 1, 9, 11); rhythm guitar (track 2); acoustic guitar (track 11)
- Massimo Varini – rhythm and solo guitar (tracks 4, 7)
- Slash – solo guitar (track 3)
- Rafael Moreira – solo guitar (track 6); rhythm guitar (track 10)
- Stef Burns – solo guitar (tracks 8, 12); rhythm guitar (track 12)
- Paul Bushnell – bass guitar (tracks 1–2)
- Tony Franklyn – bass guitar (tracks 3, 5, 8)
- Luca Bignardi – bass guitar (tracks 4, 7); programming (track 7)
- Corey C. – bass guitar (track 6, 10)
- Leland "Lee" Sklar – bass guitar (tracks 9, 11)
- Max Gelsi – bass guitar (track 12)
- Vinnie Colaiuta – drums (tracks 1–2, 5, 7–9, 11)
- Matt Laug – drums (track 3)
- Paolo Valli – drums (track 4)
- Joey K – drums (track 6, 10)
- Gabriele "Lele" Melotti – drums (track 12)
- Frank Nemola – flugelhorn, trumpet, strings (track 1); keyboards, programming (tracks 1, 5–6, 8–12)
- Celso Valli – strings (track 4); keyboards, piano (tracks 4, 7)
- Alessandro Cortini – keyboards (track 3)
- Moreno Ferrari – backing vocals (tracks 1–2, 5–6, 8)
- Silvio Pozzoli – backing vocals (tracks 1–2, 5–6, 8)
- Luciano Palermo – backing vocals (track 3)
- Simone Sello – backing vocals (track 3)
- Alessia Raisi – backing vocals (track 7)
- Antonella Pepe – backing vocals (track 7)
- Gaetano Curreri – backing vocals (track 7)
- Giordano Mazzi – backing vocals (track 7)

=== Technicians ===
- Vasco Rossi – producer (all tracks)
- Guido Elmi – producer (tracks 1–3, 5, 8–12)
- Celso Valli – producer (tracks 4, 7)
- Nicola Venieri – recording engineering (tracks 1, 2, 5, 6, 8–12)
- Arturo Bertusi – cover art
- Derek Karlquist – assistant engineer (tracks 2, 3, 8)
- Enrico "Flint" Mambella – assistant engineer (tracks 1, 2, 5, 6, 8–12)
- Kevin Mills – assistant engineer (tracks 1, 5, 6, 9–12)
- Floriano Fini – executive producer; photography
- Tania Sachs – management (press office)
- Vittorio Costa, Esq. – management (legal office)
- Maurizio Biancani – mastering
- Joe Barresi – mixing (tracks 2, 8)
- Nicola Venieri – mixing (tracks 1, 5, 6, 9–12)
- Luca Bignardi – mixing, recording engineering (tracks 4, 7)
- Mike Tacci – mixing, recording engineering (track 3)
- Efrem Raimondi – photography
- Gianluca Simoni – photography (cover)
- Daniela Fregni, Danilo "Roccia" D'Alessandro, Federica Forni Ventura, Valeria Pallottini – staff
