= Daniel Renoult =

French politician (1880–1958)

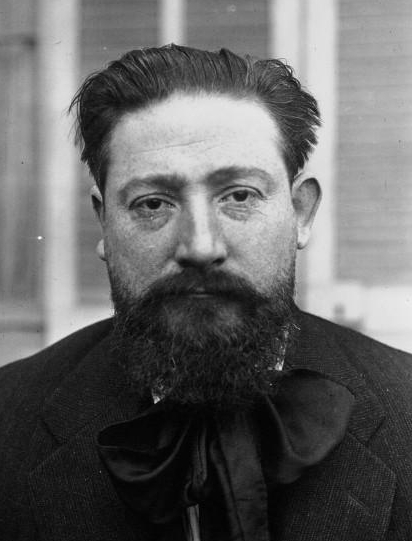
Renoult in 1921 at the 1st Congress of the Communist Party in Marseille

Daniel Renoult (18 December 1880 – 17 July 1958) was a French Communist Party (Parti communiste français, PCF) politician, an activist and journalist. He was Mayor of Montreuil from 1944 to his death in 1958, during which he made some major changes and contributions to the city.

== Biography ==
Born on 18 December 1880, in the 5th arrondissement of Paris, France into a bourgeois family, Renoult was raised Republican and Progressive. He was the son of a lawyer and the brother of a radical minister in the government, Aristide Briand. When Renoult was a young student, he was caught in the tide of opinion raised by the defense of Captain Dreyfus.

In 1906, he helped, with Jean Jaurès, Jules Guesde and Édouard Vaillant, in the development of the French Section of the Workers' International (Section Française de l'Internationale Ouvrière, SFIO) and in 1908, he joined the newspaper L'Humanité, writing on the topic of parliamentary affairs. He witnessed Jaurès assassination on 31 July 1914. He served as an infantry sergeant in the Middle East. After the conflict, he became a pacifist and resumed his journalistic profession alongside Gabriel Peri. He was an admirer of the Bolsheviks and events in Russia during this period, and was a leader of the Comintern ("Third International").

Renoult and Gérard Longuet attended the Comintern's Halle congress in October 1920. Two months later, Renoult was one of the delegates at SFIO's Tours Congress, where he voted for the split that gave rise to the PCF. Described as, "One of the leading figures of the Reconstructionist Committee" in March 1920, he traveled to Italy to try to "dissuade Serrati and the rest of the Direzione from their earlier refusal to participate in a reconstructionist conference" but was poorly received by them. Renoult attending the 1st Congress of the PCF in Marseille in 1921, as did Charles Rappoport, Renoult, Ludovic-Oscar Frossard, and Marcel Cachin. Renoult was referred to as being one of Cachin's henchman. As a veteran political activist, he arrived in Montreuil in 1928.

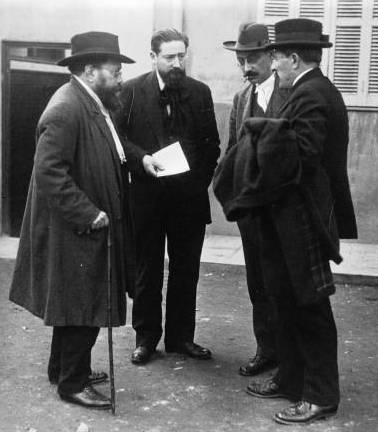
Renoult at the 1st Congress of the PCF in Marseille in 1921. From the left, Charles Rappoport, Renoult, Ludovic-Oscar Frossard, and Marcel Cachin.

He was first elected as the first Communist Deputy on 19 May 1935, then general councillor of the Seine on May 26 of that year. However, he was suspended on 5 October 1939, pursuant to an order of the Minister of the Interior, which dissolved all Communist municipal councils of the Seine and the Oise. On 26 October 1939, the PCF was dissolved and on 14 February 1940, Renoult was arrested in Paris. He was taken to the Baillet camp, then transferred to the Ile d'Yeu in April 1940, Camp Gurs, Camp Nexon, citadel of Sisteron, locked in the camp of Saint-Sulpice, then moved to the prison at Castres, again to Nexon camp and back to Castres, then again to Saint-Sulpice in prison Eysses, to Camp Carrière and finally in 1944 moved to the citadel of Sisteron again.

On 19 July 1944, he was released and returned to Montreuil. On September 5 of that year, he was given the presidency of the Local Committee of Liberation and the provisional presidency of the municipality. He was elected President of the Union of Mayors of the Seine and Vice President of the Association of Mayors of France (Association des maires de France, AMF). He was re-elected mayor of Montreuil in October 1947 and April 1953, and General Councillor in May 1953. Sick at the time of the events of May 1958, he devoted his last energy to the defense of the Republic. Under his leadership, several projects were launched including the development of a site which would become to the Parc des Beaumonts, unemployment assistance, social housing, and the creation of institutions that still exist today. He built health centres, the new library, and the Montreuil Veterans Home amongst others.

Renoult was described as sincere, stormy, and extreme. He died 17 July 1958, at his home, 10 Rue Parmentier in Montreuil leaving two messages in advance which gave a lucid sense of his impending doom. One mentioned his attachment to the city of Montreuil, the other to remind people of his loyalty to the French Communist Party and its ideals of youth. However, in a 1953 publication by Leon Trotsky, Trotsky said "Comrade Daniel Renault, instead of explaining the adopted decisions and instead of calling for their unanimous fulfillment, has engaged in a bitter campaign against the tactic of the united front and against the Communist International as a whole."

== Works ==
- L'Internationale, journal communiste du soir... (1921)
