= Lorenzo Galluzzi =

Italian and French cell biologist (born 1980)

Lorenzo Galluzzi (born 1980) is an Italian and French cell biologist best known for his experimental and conceptual contributions to the fields of cell death, autophagy, tumor metabolism and tumor immunology.

== Biography ==
Galluzzi (born September 26, 1980) is currently assistant professor of Cell Biology in Radiation Oncology at the Department of Radiation Oncology of the Weill Cornell Medical College (New York, USA) and Assistant Professor Adjunct at the Department of Dermatology of the Yale University School of Medicine (New Haven, USA). Prior to joining Weill Cornell Medical College (2017), Galluzzi was a Junior Scientist of the Research Team "Apoptosis, Cancer and Immunity" at the Cordeliers Research Center (Paris, France; 2012–2016) under the direction of Dr. Guido Kroemer. Galluzzi did his post-doctoral training at the Gustave Roussy Cancer Center (Villejuif, France; 2009–2011), after receiving his PhD from the Paris Sud University (Le Kremlin-Bicetre, France; 2005–2008). Galluzzi is associate director of the European Academy for Tumor Immunology (EATI), and founding member of the European Research Institute for Integrated Cellular Pathology (ERI-ICP).

Galluzzi is best known for his experimental and conceptual contributions to the fields of cell death, autophagy, tumor metabolism and tumor immunology. In particular, he provided profound insights into the links between adaptive stress responses in cancer cells and the activation of a clinically relevant tumor-targeting immune response in the context of chemotherapy and radiation therapy. As of today, Galluzzi has published more than 500 scientific articles in more than 100 different international peer-reviewed journals, collaborating with more than 3,000 co-authors. According to Google Scholar, Galluzzi has a h-index of 125, placing him amongst the top-50 Italian scientists working in biomedical sciences. According to a survey published by Lab Times, he is currently the 6th and the youngest of the 30 most-cited European cell biologists (relative to the period 2007–2013). In 2021, Galluzzi was nominated Highly Cited Researcher by Clarivate Analytics in three different disciplines along with only 22 other scientists worldwide all disciplines confounded.

In addition to his research and dissemination activity, Galluzzi currently operates as editor-in-chief of three journals: OncoImmunology (which he co-founded with Dr. Guido Kroemer and Dr. Laurence Zitvogel in 2011), International Review of Cell and Molecular Biology, and Molecular and Cellular Oncology (which he co-founded with Dr. Guido Kroemer in 2013). Galluzzi also serves as founding editor for Microbial Cell and Cell Stress, and associate editor for Cell Death and Disease and Aging.
