= Laurence Zitvogel =

French physician

- Zitvogel in 2020
- Born: 25 December 1963 (age 62); Sureness, France
- Education: Paris University
- Occupations: Oncologist, immunologist, researcher
- Honours: Baillet Latour Awarded by the Belgian Monarchy

Laurence Zitvogel (born 25 December 1963) is a French physician-scientist specializing in oncology and immunology. Zitvogel is a clinical oncologist, a researcher in the Laboratory of Tumor Immunology and Immunotherapy, and a professor at Paris-Saclay University. She has studied the correlation between the immune system and the success of cancer treatments for over 30 years. Her primary research experience lies in exosomes, studying the biological impact of structural abnormalities on malignant neoplasms, and anti-tumor therapy. Through her work as a professor and researcher, Zitvogel discovered that chemotherapy could delay the growth of tumors in mouse models. Her team reported the first anticancer probiotic, Enterococcus hirae. As of 2020, she is researching an effective and inexpensive diagnostic test to predict dysbiosis and is investigating the promising lead on the role of gut microbiotes in anti-tumour immunotherapy.

Throughout her career, she has received numerous honors and awards ranging from the Bob Pinedo Cancer Care Award to the ESMO Award for Immuno-Oncology.

== Personal life ==
Laurence Zitvogel was born in Suresnes, France. Zitvogel has worked with her spouse, Guido Kroemer, since 2001.

== Education ==
Zitvogel earned her degree in medical oncology from the University of Paris in 1992. Zitvogel started her scientific career in 1993 at the University of Pittsburgh (USA) in Michael Lotze's laboratory. She received her Ph.D. in Immunology at the University of Pittsburgh Cancer Institute and the Gustav Roussy Cancer Center in 1995.

== Career and leadership ==
Zitvogel supervised work in 2013 that analyzed the multifaceted modes of action of the anticancer probiotic, Enterococcus hirae. Zitvogel leads the French RHU Torino-Lumière and European Oncobiome consortia for the development of tests for gut dysbiosis associated with frequent cancers. She has authored over 350 publications and is the editor-in-chief and founder of one of the first journals in immune-oncology, OncoImmunology.

She is a professor of immunobiology at the University of Paris XI Medical School and is a scientific director at the Department of Immuno-Oncology at the Gustave Roussy Cancer Center in Villejuif, France. She is also the director of U1015 Inserm Tumour Immunology and Immunotherapy Laboratory and co-director of the Center for Clinical Investigation in Biotherapies of Cancer at Inserm. Zitvogel co-founded EverImmune, a clinical-stage biotechnology company developing live biotherapeutic products as adjuncts to cancer immunotherapy. Zitvogel's research team found that bacteria in the gut had a major effect on the efficacy of checkpoint inhibitors in mice.

== Research ==
Zitvogel's work focuses on intestinal bacterial flora. Her primary research objectives are to identify cell adhesion molecules that serve as actionable checkpoints for tumor surveillance. The research group she directs has been focused on the discovery and validation of antibody combination therapies.

Zitvogel discovered that cancer therapies with long-term beneficial effects may have limited impact on local disease, but should activate a relevant adaptive immune reaction. Pioneering work by Zitvogel and Kroemer revealed that chemotherapy could slow the growth of tumors growing on immunocompetent mice, but had no effect on tumors established on immunodeficient mice. Zitvogel set up a patient diagnosis platform that allows the patient's tumor to be removed when performing the operation. Zitvogel hypothesized that disrupting the MAdCAM-1–α4β7 interaction might cause Treg17 cells to migrate from the gut to the tumors, thereby compromising the anticancer effects of immune checkpoint inhibitors (ICIs). Accompanying this, she saw that the relocation of enterotropic and immunosuppressive Treg17 cells to cancerous tissue (tumors and tdLNs) is repressed by the molecular interaction between the HEV addressin MAdCAM-1 and the integrin α4β7 expressed by Treg17 cells. Zitvogel's research also revealed that antibiotics administered before or during treatment may worsen the efficacy of immunotherapy. She examined the connections between nutrition, inflammation, and the immune system's impact on cancer. Correspondingly, Zitvogel found that nutritional interventions are emerging as novel strategies for improving the outcome of treatments with PD-1/PD-L1–targeting ICIs. Continuing on with Zitvogel's cancer research, she found that probiotics used as a complement to the existing therapeutic arsenal (surgery, radiotherapy, chemotherapy, hormone therapy, immunotherapy) could become a sixth therapeutic modality against cancer. Zitovgel's ongoing research falls into three main categories: studying the modes of action of immune checkpoint inhibitors, seeking predictors of response to immunomodulators, and defining the role of the gut microbiome in cancer immunosurveillance.

== Awards ==
Zitvogel's awards include:

- INSERM prize for Research in Clinical and Therapeutic Approaches to Cancer (2007)
- Swiss Bridge Award (2014)
- European Society for Medical Oncology (ESMO) for Immuno-Oncology (2017)
- ASCO-SITC Award (2017)
- Charles Rodolphe Brupbacher Prize for Cancer Research (2017)
- Baillet Latour Prize (2018)
- Jakob-Herz Prize (2018)
- ARC Griffuel Prize (2019)
- Bob Pinedo Cancer Care Award (2022)
