= House of Baillet =

Belgian noble family

(de) Baillet Baillet von Latour
- Noble family
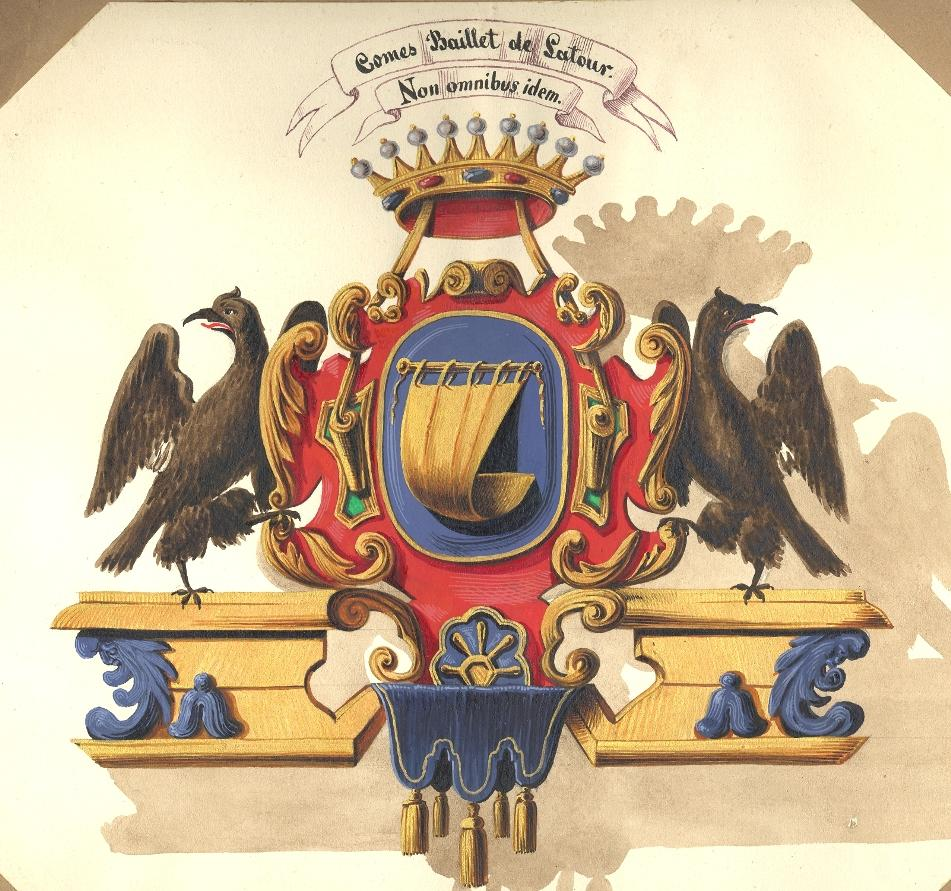
- Country: Spanish Netherlands; Austrian Netherlands
- Titles: Lords of Bellefontaine; Lords of Lintere; Lords of Rechingen; Lords of Munischbach; Lords of la Tour; Barons of Geffe; Counts of Baillet; Viscounts of Merlemont
- Estate: Latour Castle
- Cadet branches: Baillet-Latour (+)

The Baillet family or de Baillet or Baillet von Latour is a former Belgian noble family. The house is divided into different branches, the most known were the Counts of Baillet-Latour.

== History ==
The title of Count of Baillet was created by imperial decree of Charles VI, Holy Roman Emperor on 10 March 1719. The first Count of Baillet was Christophe-Ernest. He was the son of Maximilien-Antoine de Baillet, Seigneur de Latour (b. 1627) and his wife, Anne Marie Coenen. The family had great influence in politics and church, many members were active in the Catholic Party.

The family resided in the Chateau de Latour next to Virton until 1794. In 1980 the last male heir, Count Alfred de Baillet-Latour died without children meaning that the title became extinct. Upon his death the family fortune was, according to his will, used to found the Artois-Baillet Latour Foundation.
