= InBev-Baillet Latour Fund =

Belgian non-profit organization

The Artois-Baillet Latour Foundation is a Belgian non-profit organization which was founded on 1 March 1974.

== History ==
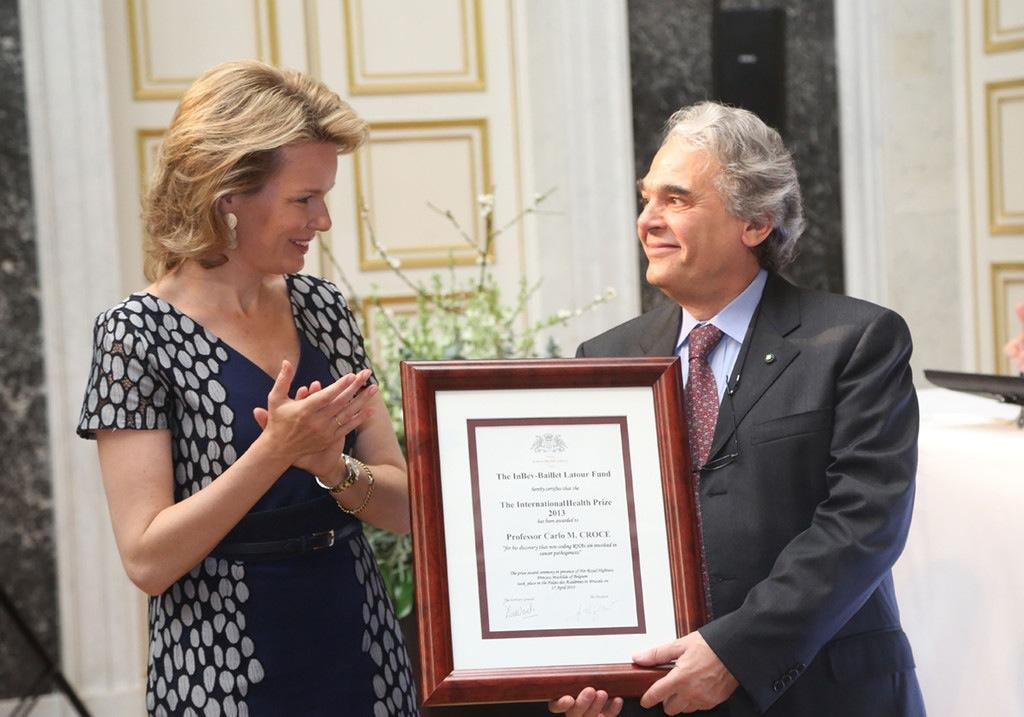
The 2013 prize is given by The Queen of the Belgians to Carlo M. Croce

The foundation was born by the initiative of Count Alfred de Baillet Latour, who was the Director of the Artois Breweries in Leuven, Belgium. He was the last male heir of the old House of Baillet, and was through his mother related to the House of Spoelberch, who own the Artois Company. In 1995 the name was changed to Interbrew-Baillet Latour Foundation and again in 2005 to InBev-Baillet Latour Fund.

The Foundation wants to encourage and reward achievements of outstanding human value in the Arts and Sciences. It can do this by means of Prizes, or by any other means that the Foundation might deem appropriate.

== InBev-Baillet Latour Health Prize ==
The Artois-Baillet Latour Health Prize was established in 1977 to be awarded periodically to recognize the merits of a person whose work has contributed prominently to the improvement of human health in the fields of metabolic disorders, infectious diseases, neurological diseases, cancer and cardiovascular disease. Since 2000 the prize has been awarded annually. Worth 250,000 euros, it is Belgium's major scientific prize. Since 2005, it has been known as the InBev-Baillet Latour Health Prize.

== Health Prize Laureates ==
2018 Professor Laurence Zitvogel, University of Paris-Sud and Professor Guido Kroemer, Paris Descartes University (cancer)
2017 Professor Adriano Aguzzi, Zürich University (neurological disorders)
2016 Professor Charles M. Rice, Rockefeller University (infectious diseases)
2015 Professor Bruce M. Spiegelman, Harvard Medical School (metabolic disorders)
2014 Professor Harry C. Dietz, Johns Hopkins University (cardiovascular disease)
2013 Professor Carlo M. Croce, Ohio State University (cancer)
2012 Professor Gero Miesenböck, University of Oxford (neurological disorders)
2011 Professor Jean-Laurent Casanova, Rockefeller University (infectious diseases)
2010 Professor Stephen O'Rahilly, University of Cambridge
2009 Professor Kari Alitalo, University of Helsinki and Professor Seppo Ylä-Herituala, University of Kuopio
2008 Professor Robert A. Weinberg, Whitehead Institute for Biomedical Research, Cambridge, Massachusetts, United States of America
2007 Professor Peter H. Seeburg, Max-Planck-Institute for Medical Research, Heidelberg, Germany
2006 Professor Hidde Ploegh, Whitehead Institute, Massachusetts Institute of Technology (MIT), United States of America
2005 Professors Désiré Collen and Peter Carmeliet, Katholieke Universiteit Leuven and the VIB, Belgium
2004 Professor Elio Lugaresi, Bologna, Italy
2003 Professor Nancy C. Andreasen, Iowa City, United States of America
2002 Professor Robert M. Krug, Austin, United States of America
2001 Dr Jan Van Embden, Laboratory for Infectious Diseases, Rijksinstituut voor Volksgezondheid en Milieu, Bilthoven, the Netherlands
2000 Professors Jacques Van Snick and Jean-Christophe Renauld, Ludwig Institute for Cancer Research, Université Catholique de Louvain, Belgium
1999 Professor Julien Mendlewicz of the Université Libre de Bruxelles, Brussels, Belgium
1997 Professor Michael Sela, Weizmann Institute of Science, Rehovot, Israel.
1995 Professor Roger Tsien, University of California, San Diego, United States of America
1993 Professor Jean-François Borel, University of Bern, Switzerland
1991 Professor Thomas Waldmann, National Cancer Institute, Bethesda, United States of America
1989 Professor Walter Fiers, University of Ghent, Belgium
1987 Professors Viktor Mutt and Tomas Hökfelt (Karolinska Institute, Stockholm, Sweden)
1985 Professor Johannes J. van Rood, the Netherlands
1983 Professor Jean Bernard, France
1981 Sir Cyril A. Clarke, Great Britain
1979 Sir James W. Black, Great Britain

== See also ==
- National Fund for Scientific Research (FWO, FNRS)
- Francqui Prize
- House of Baillet
- List of medicine awards
- Olivaint Conference of Belgium
