= Valeria Rossi =

Italian singer and songwriter (born 1969)

- Born: 7 March 1969 (age 57); Tripoli, Libya
- Origin: Rome, Italy
- Genres: Pop
- Occupation: Singer-songwriter
- Years active: 2001–present
- Label: BMG

Valeria Rossi (born 7 March 1969) is an Italian singer and songwriter. She is most famous for the song "Tre parole", a huge summer hit of 2001 and the second biggest-selling single of the year in Italy.

== Discography ==
=== Studio albums ===
- Ricordatevi dei fiori (2001)
- Osservi l'aria (2004)
- Bimbincucina (2014)

=== Singles ===
- "Tre parole" (2001)
- "Tutto fa l'amore" (2001)
- "Tutte le mattine" (2002)
- "Pensavo a te" (2002)
- "Luna di lana" (2003)
- "Ti dirò" (2004)
- "Io so che se ti volevo" (2004)
- "La gente non parla" (2018)
