= Tracks (Vasco Rossi album) =

Compilation album by Vasco Rossi
- Released: 22 November 2002
- Genre: Pop rock
- Length: 113:22
- Label: EMI Records

Tracks is the first compilation album by Italian singer-songwriter Vasco Rossi, released by EMI Records on 22 November 2002. Tracks was released as a double album featuring 24 songs, including hits released by Vasco Rossi at the beginning of his career, such as "Splendida giornata", as well as more recent singles. It was preceded by the single "Generale", a previously unreleased live cover of the song originally written and recorded by Francesco De Gregori. The single was recorded live on 7 July 1995 at the San Siro stadium in Milan.

The album was the best-selling record of 2002 in Italy. According to EMI Record, it had sold more than 650,000 units by the end of the year, despite being released in late November. Tracks also received a nomination for Best Italian Album at the Italian Music Awards 2003.

== Track listing ==
Disc 1

No.	Title	Length
1.	"Albachiara" (live)	3:58
2.	"Generale" (live at San Siro, 1995)	4:30
3.	"Guarda dove vai"	5:35
4.	"Io no"	5:16
5.	"Stupendo"	6:32
6.	"C'è chi dice no" (live)	4:41
7.	"Gli spari sopra"	3:29
8.	"Mi si escludeva"	4:48
9.	"Liberi liberi"	6:15
10.	"Gli angeli"	5:25
11.	"Vivere"	5:26
12.	"La fine del millennio"	4:24

Disc 2

No.	Title	Length
1.	"Ogni volta" (2002 version)	4:13
2.	"Splendida giornata"	4:16
3.	"Rewind" (radio edit)	3:57
4.	"Quanti anni hai"	4:43
5.	"Gabri"	4:30
6.	"Benvenuto"	5:25
7.	"Sally"	4:43
8.	"Una canzone per te" (live)	3:32
9.	"Senza parole"	4:43
10.	"Toffee"	5:12
11.	"Se è vero o no"	3:48
12.	"Siamo soli"	4:01

== Charts ==
=== Weekly charts ===
Chart (2002)	Peak position
Italian Albums (FIMI)	1
Swiss Albums (Schweizer Hitparade)	13

=== Year-end charts ===
Chart (2002)	Position
Italy (FIMI)	1

== Certifications ==
Region	Certification	Certified units/sales
Italy (FIMI) Since 2009	Gold	25,000^{‡}
^{‡} Sales+streaming figures based on certification alone.
