= Vita spericolata =

Single by Vasco Rossi

from the album Bollicine
- B-side: "Mi piaci perché"
- Released: 24 January 1983
- Label: Carosello Records
- Songwriters: Vasco Rossi, Tullio Ferro
- Producer: Guido Elmi

Vasco Rossi singles chronology
"Una splendida giornata" (1982)	"Vita spericolata" (1983)	"Brava Giulia" (1987)

Music video
- "Vita spericolata" on YouTube

"Vita spericolata" (transl. "Reckless life") is a 1983 song composed by Vasco Rossi (lyrics) and Tullio Ferro (music) and performed by Vasco Rossi.

== Background ==
The song had a gestation of about an year; it was initially presented by composer Ferro with English lyrics, and in an early draft it was a love song about a girl named Licia. Eventually, Rossi chose to reprise the same theme already explored in previous singles "Siamo solo noi" and "Vado al massimo", namely a celebration of anticonformism and of freedom from all schemes and conventions.

The song premiered at the 33rd edition of the Sanremo Music Festival, where it ranked penultimate. It eventually turned out to be a long-selling hit and Rossi's consacration. It has been described as a "manifesto of human individualism taken to the extreme between transgression, boredom, melancholy and the determination to live without limits or schedules".

Cover versions of the song include those recorded by Francesco De Gregori, Massimo Ranieri and Thelma Houston with an English-language version titled "My Life is Mine", lyrics by Jean Rich in the 1994 album Thelma Houston (Fonit Cetra - CDL 378). Gino Paoli reprised its refrain in his hit "Quattro amici".

== Track listing ==
- 7" single
1. "Vita spericolata" (Vasco Rossi, Tullio Ferro ) - 4:40
2. "Mi piaci perché" (Vasco Rossi) - 3:17

== Charts ==
Chart	Peak position
Italy (Musica e dischi)	3

== Certifications ==
Region	Certification	Certified units/sales
Italy (FIMI) certification for sales occurred since January 2009 alone	2× Platinum	140,000^{‡}
^{‡} Sales+streaming figures based on certification alone.
