= Albachiara =

Single by Vasco Rossi

from the album Non siamo mica gli americani
- B-side: "Fegato, fegato spappolato"
- Released: 25 May 1979
- Recorded: Late 1978
- Studio: Fonoprint Studio, Bologna
- Length: 4:06
- Label: Lotus Records
- Songwriters: Vasco Rossi; Alan Taylor
- Producer: Alan Taylor

"Albachiara" is a song recorded by Italian singer-songwriter Vasco Rossi for his second studio album, Non siamo mica gli americani, and released as a single by Lotus Records on 25 May 1979. The song was produced by Alan Taylor and written by Vasco Rossi himself, although its lyrics are officially credited to both Rossi and Taylor.

The song became Rossi's first strong commercial success and later became one of his most popular songs among fans.

== Background ==
Vasco Rossi composed "Albachiara" starting from a track originally written by his friend Massimo Riva. The song, titled "Seveso", was never released. The song's lyrics were inspired by Giovanna, a thirteen-years-old girl Rossi used to see at a bus stop in his hometown of Zocca, during the late 1970s. Rossi, who was a university student, observed her gaze for long. The song's lyrics also describe an imaginary scene in which she is alone in her bedroom, exploring her own teenage body. When the girl turned 18-years-old, Rossi revealed Giovanna the song was dedicated to her. He later decided to write another song, "Una canzone per te", describing Giovanna's surprise when she was told about being 'Albachiara'.

The song's lyrics are credited to Vasco Rossi and Alan Taylor, who produced the track, while music is credited to Rossi himself, despite he started from a track composed by Riva. After Taylor's death, Rossi revealed he actually wrote the lyrics on his own, but left a half of the song's rights to Taylor in exchange for a guitar, adding he did not regret his choice. The track was recorded at the Fonoprint studio in late 1978, with Gaetano Curreri playing the piano intro, Maurizio Solieri playing guitar and Giovanni Pezzoli playing drums.

== Legacy ==
The song's popularity endures in time. It is performed at the end of each Rossi's concert since the 1980s, after he tried to replace it with "Siamo solo noi", noticing people refused to leave without hearing "Albachiara" as the last song.

The 45 rpm single was re-released in 2017 for the Record Store Day. In June 2019, the Italian Society of Authors and Publishers tributed the song with a plaque reproducing the document which first registered the song's rights, forty years earlier. In February 2020, Rossi's hometown, Zocca, homaged his most popular citizen with lights reproducing the lyrics of "Albachiara". The artistic installation, originally conceived as a temporary celebration of Rossi's birthday, later became permanent.

In 2008, Stefano Salvati directed the film Albakiara – Il film, titled after Vasco Rossi's song, which is also included in its soundtrack. Italian rapper Fabri Fibra cited the song in his songs "Le donne" (2011) and "Dagli sbagli si impara", featuring vocals by Elisa. Italian singer Noemi performed the song during the second series of X Factor, with a new arrangement written by her coach Morgan. The song was recorded in two slightly different versions, for the TV show's compilation album—titled X Factor Anteprima Compilation 2009—and for Noemi's eponymous debut EP.

In 2020, during the contest "I Love My Radio", "Albachiara" was voted as people's favorite song in a field of 45 hits, selected by Italian radio stations among the most played tracks during the 45-years-long history of Italian private radio stations.

== Track listing ==
7-inch single – Lotus Records – LS 2812

No.	Title	Length
1.	"Albachiara"	4:06
2.	"Fegato, fegato spappolato"	3:15

== Charts ==
Chart (2012)	Peak position
Italy (FIMI)	26

== Certifications ==
Region	Certification	Certified units/sales
Italy (FIMI) Since 2009	2× Platinum	100,000^{‡}
^{‡} Sales+streaming figures based on certification alone.
