= Alfred de Baillet Latour =

Belgian count (1901–1980)

Alfred, Count de Baillet Latour (1901 – 28 September 1980) was a Belgian count.

== End of the House of Baillet ==
Alfred was the last grandson of Ferdinand de Baillet-Latour, Governor of Antwerp and a nephew of Henri II, Count de Baillet-Latour (1876–1942): 3rd president of the International Olympic Committee.

His mother was viscountess Antoinette de Spoelberch, and belonged to the owners of Artois holding. He started his professional career at the Artois brewery in 1936 and became its president in 1947.

He died without heirs, and the family fortune was, according to his will, used to found the Artois-Baillet Latour Foundation.

== Sources ==
- Francis Dierckxsens, Familie de Baillet-Latour. Van Bourgondië tot Brasschaat, Brasschaat
- Biografie van de familie de Baillet Latour
