= Zocca =

- Comune
- Comune di Zocca
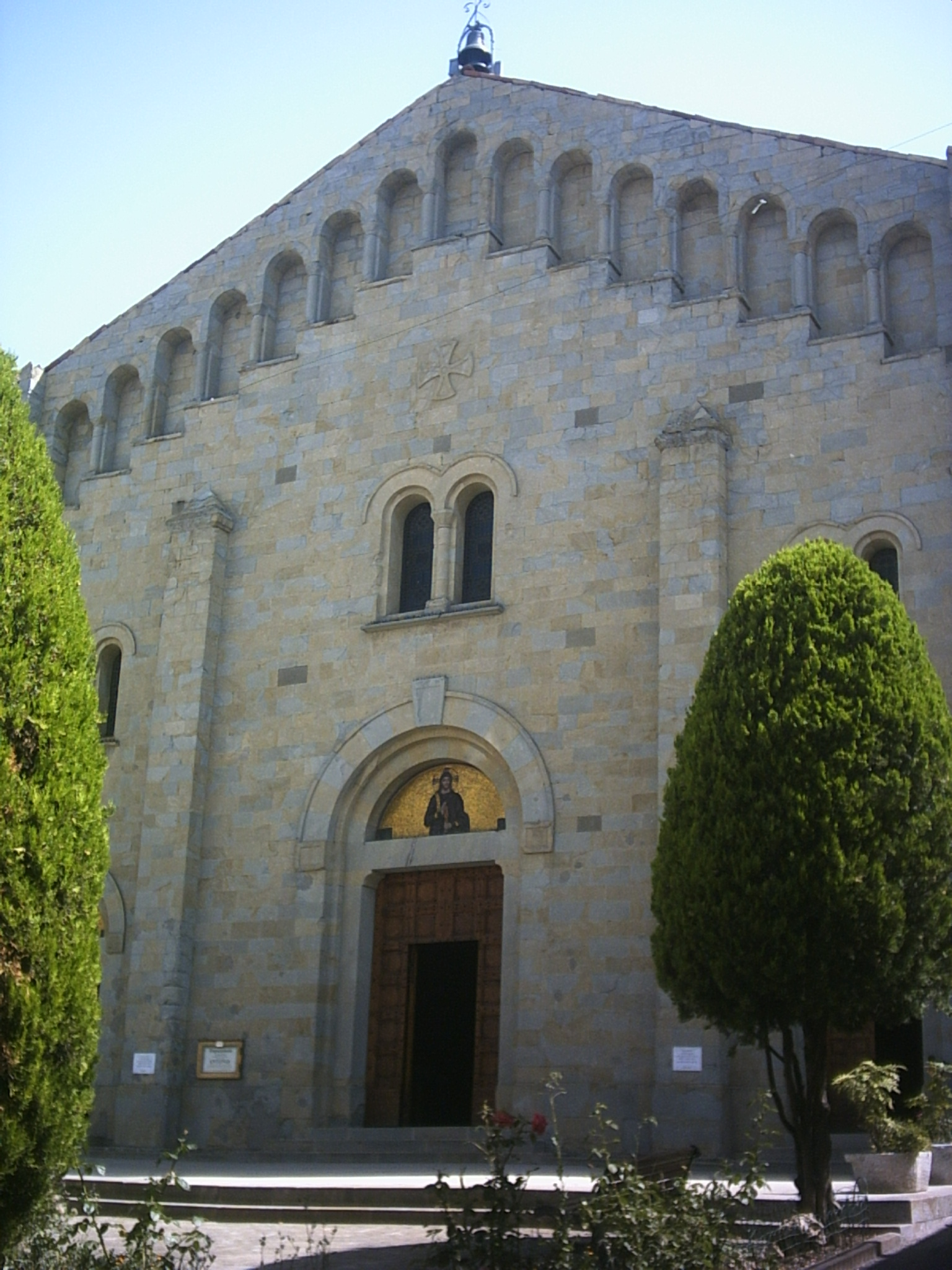

- Location within Italy Location within Emilia-Romagna
- Coordinates: 44°20′46″N 10°59′39″E
- Country: Italy
- Region: Emilia-Romagna
- Province: Modena (MO)
- Frazioni: Ciano, Missano, Montalbano, Montecorone, Montetortora, Montombraro, Rosola

Government
  - Mayor: Federico Ropa

Area
  - Total: 69.1 km^{2} (26.7 sq mi)
- Elevation: 759 m (2,490 ft)

Population (31 December 2014)
  - Total: 4,840
  - Density: 70.0/km^{2} (181/sq mi)
- Demonym: Zocchesi
- Time zone: UTC+1 (CET)
  - Summer (DST): UTC+2 (CEST)
- Postal code: 41059
- Dialing code: 059
- Patron saint: Sacro Cuore
- Website: Official website

Zocca (Frignanese: La Zòca) is a comune (municipality) in the Province of Modena in the Italian region Emilia-Romagna, located about 45 kilometres (28 mi) southwest of Bologna and about 35 kilometres (22 mi) south of Modena.

Zocca borders the following municipalities: Castel d'Aiano, Guiglia, Montese, Pavullo nel Frignano, Valsamoggia, Vergato.

== People ==
- Maurizio Cheli, astronaut
- Lorenzo Galluzzi, scientist
- Marco Santagata, academic, writer and critic
- Vasco Rossi, singer-songwriter
