= Guido Kroemer =

Molecular biologist

- Education: University of Innsbruck
- Awards: Charles Rodolphe Brupbacher Prize
- Scientific career
- Fields: mitochondria

Guido Kroemer (born 11 June 1961) is a cell biologist who has made contributions to the understanding of the role of mitochondria in cell death. He is a member of multiple scientific academies in Europe and is one of the most highly cited authors in cell biology.

== Biography ==
Kroemer was born in Leer, Germany. He completed medical school at the University of Innsbruck in Austria and earned a Ph.D. in biology from the Autonomous University of Madrid. Early in his career, Kroemer worked for the Spanish National Research Council. Now based in France, he is a cell biology researcher with INSERM and a Professor of the Faculty of Medicine of Paris Descartes University. Kroemer first discovered the fact that mitochondrial membrane permeabilization is a concrete step in the process of programmed cell death.

In a publication analysis by the news magazine Lab Times, Kroemer was the most highly cited cell biologist for the period between 2007 and 2013. Three other scientists who had worked at Kroemer's lab were also highly ranked in the analysis. Kroemer is the editor-in-chief of the journal Cell Death & Disease.

=== Awards ===
- 1998 Monika Kutzner Prize of the Berlin-Brandenburg Academy of Sciences
- 1999 Gallet & Breton Prize of the French Academy of Medicine
- 2006 Descartes Prize of the European Union
- 2007 Carus Medal of the German Academy of Sciences
- 2007 Grand Prix Mergier-Bourdeix of the French Academy of Sciences
- 2007 Member of the Academy of Sciences Leopoldina
- 2009 Lucien Dautrebande Prize of the Belgian Royal Academy of Medicine
- 2010 Duquesne Prize of the French National League against Cancer
- 2010 Fellow of the European Academy of Sciences
- 2011 “Coup d´Elan” Prize of the Bettencourt-Schueller Foundation
- 2012 Leopold Griffuel Prize of the French Association for Cancer Research
- 2013 Advanced Investigator Award from the European Research Council
- 2014 Mitjavile Prize of the French Academy of Medicine
- 2015 Galien Prize for Pharmacological Research
- 2016 Grand Priz Claude Bernard of the City of Paris
- 2017 Brupbacher Prize for Cancer Research
- 2018 ADPS Longevity Research Award
- 2018 Baillet-Latour Health Prize
- 2019 international Lombardia è Ricerca Prize

Kroemer's wife, Laurence Zitvogel, is a medical oncologist at the Institut Gustave Roussy and they collaborate on cancer research.
