= Vasco Rossi =

Italian singer-songwriter and poet

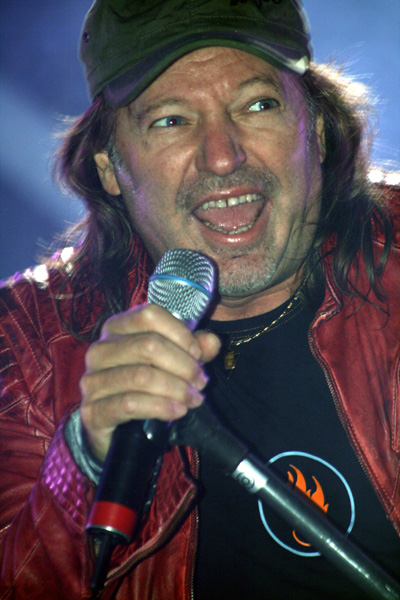
- Rossi in 2007

Background information
- Born: 7 February 1952 (age 74); Zocca, Emilia-Romagna, Italy
- Genres: Pop; pop rock; rock
- Years active: 1977–present
- Website: www.vascorossi.net

Vasco Rossi (born 7 February 1952), also known mononymously as Vasco or with the nickname Il Blasco, is an Italian singer-songwriter and poet. He has published 30 albums (not including unofficial releases) and written over 250 songs, as well as lyrics for other artists.

Rossi calls himself a provocautore (an Italian portmanteau for "provoking author") as throughout his career he has been regularly criticized over his choice of lifestyle and the lyrics in his songs. With more than 35 million copies sold, he is one of the best-selling Italian singers. His Modena Park 2017 concert is the third-highest-attended ticketed concert of all time.

== Biography ==
=== Early life and education ===
Vasco Rossi was born in Zocca, in the province of Modena (Emilia-Romagna). His father, Carlo Rossi, was a truck driver, and his mother, Novella, was a housewife. It was his mother herself who decided to enrol him in singing school when he was a little boy, a choice that must have seemed rather peculiar within the mentality of a small village in the Apennines like Zocca. Nonetheless, Rossi fell in love with music and at the age of 14 began playing with his first band.

Rossi and his family moved to Bologna, Italy, where he studied accounting in high school. Upon graduating, he opened a music club, Punto Club, and enrolled in university at the faculty of Economics and Business. In the meantime he supported himself by working as a DJ and founding, along with friends, one of the first private radio stations in Italy, "Punto Radio", with which he began slowly and timidly showcasing his own songs.

=== Musical career ===
Encouraged by his friend Gaetano Curreri (now a leading member of the Italian rock band Stadio), Rossi released his first EP on 13 June 1977, which included the songs "Jenny è pazza" (Jenny is crazy) and "Silvia", and a full-length album in 1978, Ma cosa vuoi che sia una canzone ("What do you expect from a song"). In 1979, he released a second album, Non siamo mica gli americani ("We're certainly not Americans"), considered emblematic of Rossi's poetic style. His most controversial album, Colpa d'Alfredo ("Alfredo's fault"), followed in 1980; its title track was censored from the radio and drew bitter criticism because it contained some lyrics referring to women considered too explicit at that time. The controversy actually increased Rossi's popularity, and he quickly saw himself famous on a national level, particularly after performing live on Domenica In, a popular Italian television program. The performance did not particularly please journalist Nantas Salvalaggio, who published a scathing article against Rossi, calling him a drug addict. Rossi argued that Salvalaggio evidently did not understand his music and remarked how easy it is to criticize a still unknown artist who cannot defend himself.

In 1981, the album Siamo solo noi ("It's only us") was released. The title track, another signature song of his, would become commonly recognized as a generational hymn.

In 1982, Rossi took part for the first time in the Sanremo Music Festival, performing the song "Vado al massimo" ("I'm taking it to the max"). Here, he once again found himself under harsh criticism and came in last place in the festival. In April of the same year, the album Vado al Massimo was released. The following year, he reappeared at the Sanremo Music Festival, this time performing "Vita spericolata" (Daredevil Life), probably his most popular song, and finishing in second-to-last place due to his apparent state of intoxication. The following album, Bollicine ("Little Bubbles"), published in 1983, was his sixth in seven years, and was the album that consecrated him definitively as an idol of the new generation and an icon of Italian rock. The title track, whose lyrics are about Coke (but also demonstrate a clear assonance with cocaine), won the Festivalbar '83, and his tour that year was an enormous success.

To celebrate this positive period in his career, Rossi released his first live recording in 1984, Va bene, va bene così ("It's alright, it's alright this way"). In April, however, he was arrested on charges of drug possession. He was immediately granted provisional release from jail, but subsequently sentenced to 2 years and eight months of probation. Shortly thereafter, he released his next album, Cosa succede in città ("What's going on in the city"), which became one of his weakest critically and did not reach past sales.

In 1987, Vasco Rossi's ninth album, C'è chi dice no ("There Are Some Who Say No"), was released; the ever-increasing numbers of fans showing up to his concerts forced him to quit performing in clubs and normal-sized venues and begin the era of something for which he is known to this day—playing in and selling out big arenas and stadiums.

His tenth studio album, Liberi liberi ("[we are] Free, Free"), followed in 1989. It reached 800,000 sales in Italy. The success of his 1989 tour brought the release of the live album Fronte del Palco (a pun on the Italian title of Marlon Brando's film "Waterfront" which was "Fronte del porto", and thus meaning "Stage Front") and the organization of two concerts in 1990, one at the San Siro stadium in Milan and the other at the Flaminio in Rome. The live album has sold over 300,000 units in Italy.

Rossi's next album, Gli spari sopra ("The shots above"), released in 1993, went ten times platinum. The title track, which was a major hit, is a cover version of Celebrate by the Irish band An Emotional Fish. In 1994, he gave the unreleased "Senza Parole" ("Without Words") as a gift to members of his official fan club.

In 1995, Rossi was again the star at San Siro with a double concert, Rock sotto l'assedio ("Rock under siege"), which protested the war in Bosnia and Herzegovina. Rossi invited a few Bosnian bands like Sikter, Lezi Majmune, and Protest to perform but was heavily criticized by the press because the proceeds weren't given to charity, despite the fact that they were never meant to be.

In 1996, Rossi recorded a new studio album, Nessun Pericolo... Per Te ("No Danger... For You"), featuring the songs "Sally" and "Gli angeli" ("The Angels"), (the video of the latter was directed by Roman Polanski). The drum of the song "Anche se" ("Even If") later called "Praticamente perfetto" ("Practically Perfect") was recorded by Taylor Hawkins. The song was later included in the album Nessun Pericolo... Per Te ("No Danger... For You") in 1996.

In 1998, Rossi rediscovered his singer-songwriter side, recording and releasing the album Canzoni per me ("Songs for me") with a softer and less "rock" sound, even remaking never-published songs written at the beginning of his career. The nature of the songs, however, did not impede Rossi from winning his second Festivalbar with the song, "L'una per te"; the name of this song, and the whole lyrics, is a word pun between the words "Luna" ("Moon") and "L'una" ("The one"). Given the low propensity of these songs to fit in his live show with the songs his fans had up to that time become accustomed to, he decided to hold just one concert in 1998, accepting the offer to be a guest star on the first evening of the new Heineken Jammin' Festival in Imola, Italy. The evening is immortalized in both video and in the 1999 live album Rewind. A few days into the tour, Rossi's inseparable friend, as well as guitarist and writer/cowriter of many songs and lyrics, Massimo Riva, died unexpectedly. He would be remembered and celebrated by Rossi and fans in nearly every concert that followed.

In 2001, Stupido Hotel ("Stupid Hotel"), was released, and Rossi won his third Festivalbar, this time with the song "Siamo Soli" ("We are alone"). In 2002, Rossi released his first official recording of remastered songs in their original version, Tracks, which was followed by three sold-out performances at San Siro Stadium in Milan. His album Buoni o cattivi ("Good or Bad Ones") was the most successful album in Italy in 2004.

On 12 May 2005, Milan's IULM conferred an honorary degree in Communication Sciences to Vasco Rossi.

On 9 September 2005, Rossi released the double DVD È solo un Rock'n'Roll show ("It's Only a Rock'n’Roll Show") with Andrea Lehotská, launching the concept of the 'movieclip', in which all the songs from Buoni o cattivi (Good or Bad [guys]) are used in a two-hour music video. Three months later, Buoni o cattivi live anthology 04.05 was released, a comprehensive box set comprising a double CD and a triple DVD, recorded live from the record-setting Buoni o cattivi tour of 2004 and 2005. In December 2005, he returned to his home town of Zocca, where his childhood friends and the rest of the community organized a tribute in his honour, including a photo display and other celebrations.

In 2007, he released the "Vasco Extended Play", which contains the hit single "Basta Poco" ("A Little Is Enough"). The EP topped the Italian FIMI Charts for 21 Weeks, making it the Italian best-selling single of 2007.

On 4 May 2010, the newspaper Corriere della Sera reported Vasco Rossi as saying the American and British governments had been responsible for preventing him and other Italian musicians from becoming known in those countries. "Just as Bob Dylan was banned from playing in China, for 20 years I was barred from London. ... It's one of the many 'presents' that America left us after World War II. To favour the sale of American and British music to Italy and discourage the export of our talents abroad."

On 4 November, he released a new album, Sono innocente (I'm innocent). The disc was preceded by the single "Come vorrei" (How I would like to). During the recording session for the new album, Vasco wrote the lyrics to a song musically written by Dave Grohl, entitled "Sognare ancora" (Dreaming Again). This particular song was included in a compilation for Dave Grohl's music project.

In May 2023, he was awarded Rome's highest civilian honour, the Lupa Capitolina, by Mayor Roberto Gualtieri.

In 2023, Netflix released a documentary titled "Living it" on the life of Rossi, covering his career and personal life over several decades

=== Retirement from touring ===
In June 2011, Rossi announced he would be retiring from touring and live work, although he would continue to work in the music business.

In January 2013, Rossi withdrew his resignation and announced a new tour in Turin and Bologna, followed by tours: Vasco Live Kom '014, Vasco Live Kom '015, Vasco Live Kom '016, and the huge concert to celebrate his 40 years of career, on 1 July 2017, held in Modena and called Modena Park. The Modena Park 2017 was the largest concert with over 225,000 tickets sold, breaking other world records. This record was beaten on 30 March 2025 by Marko Perković Thompson's July concert at the Zagreb Hippodrome, which sold over 440,000 tickets.

== Personal views ==
Rossi is an atheist. Rossi has supported anarchism.

== Controversies ==
During 2011, Vasco's lawyers threatened to undertake legal action against popular Italian satire website Nonciclopedia, the Italian version of Uncyclopedia, arguing that the rock star was offended by the content of the page. On 3 October 2011, the website shut down after repeated inquiries from the police to the site's admins. The news promptly spread across the web via thousands of tweets, blog posts, and some Italian newspapers.

== Discography ==
=== Albums ===
- 1978 – ...Ma cosa vuoi che sia una canzone...
- 1979 – Non siamo mica gli americani
- 1980 – Colpa d'Alfredo
- 1981 – Siamo solo noi
- 1982 – Vado al massimo
- 1983 – Bollicine
- 1984 – Va bene, va bene così
- 1985 – Cosa succede in città
- 1987 – C'è chi dice no
- 1989 – Liberi liberi
- 1990 – Fronte del palco
- 1993 – Gli spari sopra
- 1996 – Nessun pericolo... per te
- 1998 – Canzoni per me
- 1999 – Rewind
- 2001 – Stupido hotel
- 2002 – Tracks
- 2004 – Buoni o cattivi
- 2005 – Buoni o cattivi Live Anthology 04-05
- 2008 – Il mondo che vorrei
- 2009 – Tracks 2 – Inediti e rarità
- 2010 – London Istant Live
- 2011 – Vivere o niente
- 2011 – Live Kom '011 – the complete version
- 2012 – L'altra metà del cielo
- 2014 – Sono innocente
- 2016 – Tutto in una notte – Live Kom 015
- 2016 – Vascononstop
- 2017 – Vasco Modena Park – Live 2017
- 2019 – Vascononstop Live
- 2021 – Siamo qui
- 2022 – Vasco Live Circo Massimo Roma
- 2025 – Vasco Live Milano Sansiro

=== EPs and singles ===
- "Jenny / Silvia" (1977)
- "La nostra relazione / ... E poi mi parli di una vita insieme" (1978)
- "Albachiara / Fegato, fegato spappolato" (1979)
- "Non l'hai mica capito / Asilo republic" (1980)
- "Voglio andare al mare / Brava" (1981)
- "Splendida giornata Remix" (1982)
- "Vado al massimo / Ogni volta" (1982)
- "Vita spericolata / Mi piaci perchè" (1983)
- "Brava Giulia / Blasco Rossi" (1987)
- "Non mi va Remix" (1987)
- "Gli spari sopra (Hard Attack Mix) / Delusa (Mode Mix) / Delusa (Club Mix)" (1993)
- "Gli spari sopra (Celebrate)/Delusa (Rock Party Mix) /Se è vero o no/ L'uomo che hai di fronte (B. Mix)" (1993)
- "Senza Parole Remix" (1994)
- "Senza Parole" (1994)
- "Vasco Remixed" (1996)
- "Gli angeli" (1996)
- "Praticamente perfetto Remix / Io Perderò Remix" (1996)
- "Quanti anni hai" (1998)
- "L'una per te" (1998)
- "Io no" (1998)
- "Rewind (single)" (1998)
- "La fine del millennio" (1999)
- "Siamo soli" (2001)
- "Ti prendo e ti porto via" (2001)
- "Stupido hotel" (2001)
- "Standing ovation" (2002)
- "Io ti accontento" (2002)
- "Tu vuoi da me qualcosa" (2002)
- "Buoni o Cattivi (single)" (2004)
- "Come stai" (2004)
- "Un senso" (2004)
- "Cosa vuoi da me (remix)" (2005)
- " E..." (2005)
- "Señorita" (2005)
- "Basta poco" (2007)
- "Bollicine (Saffa remix 2007)" (2007)
- "Basta Poco (Bloom06 remix)" (2008)
- "Il mondo che vorrei" (2008)
- "Gioca con me" (2008)
- "E adesso che tocca a me" (2009)
- "Vieni qui" (2009)
- "Colpa del whisky" (2009)
- "Ad ogni costo" (2009)
- "Sto pensando a te" (2010)
- "Ho fatto un sogno" (2010)
- "Eh... già" (2011)
- "Vivere o niente" (2011)
- "Manifesto futurista della nuova umanità" (2011)
- "I soliti" (2011)
- "Stammi vicino" (2011)
- "Vivere o niente" (2012)
- "L'uomo più semplice" (2013)
- "Cambia-menti" (2013)
- "Dannate nuvole" (2014)
- "Come vorrei" (2014)
- "Sono innocente" (2015)
- "Guai" (2015)
- "Quante volte" (2015)
- "Il blues della chitarra sola" (2016)
- "Un mondo migliore" (2016)
- "Come nelle favole" (2017)
- "La verità" (2018)
- "Se ti potessi dire" (2019)
- "Una canzone d'amore buttata via" (2021)
- "Siamo qui" (2021)
- "La pioggia alla domenica" (feat. Marracash) (2022)
- "L'amore l'amore" (2022)
- "Gli Sbagli Che Fai" (2023)

=== EPs and singles (cont'd) ===
- "Come Stai" (single) (2004)
- "Buoni o Cattivi Remix" (2004)
- "Un senso" (single) (2004)
- "Anymore (single)" (2004)
- "E... (single)" (2005)
- "Cosa vuoi da me remix" (2005)
- "Basta poco" (2007)
- "Vasco Extended Play" – 3 tracks + 1 video (2007)
- "La compagnia" – Lucio Battisti Cover (2007)
- "Il mondo che vorrei" (single) (2008)
- "Gioca con me" (2008)
- "E adesso che tocca a me" (2008)
- "Vieni qui" (2009)
- "Colpa del whisky" (2009)
- "Ad ogni costo" (2009)
- "Sto pensando a te" (2009)
- "Ho fatto un sogno" (2010)
- "Eh... già" (2011)
- "I soliti" (2011)
- "Manifesto futurista della nuova umanità" (2011)
- "Stammi vicino" (2011)
- "Albachiara" (2012)
- "Susanna" (2012)
- "Vivere o niente" (2012)
- "L'uomo più semplice" (2013) (with Taylor Hawkins on drums)
- "Cambia-menti" (2013)
- "Dannate nuvole" (2014)
- "Come vorrei" (2014)
- "Sono innocente ma..." (2015)
- "Guai" (2015)
- "Quante volte" (2015)
- "Il blues della chitarra sola" (2016)
- "Un mondo migliore" (2016)
- "Come nelle favole" (2017)
- "Vasco Modena Park 01 07 17" – 4 tracks (2017)
- "La verità" (2018)
- "Se ti potessi dire" (2019)
- "Una canzone d'amore buttata via" (2021)
- "Siamo qui" (2021)

=== DVDs ===
- Rewind (1999)
- Vasco Rossi Tracks (2002)
- Vasco Rossi @ S. Siro 03 (2003)
- E' Solo Un Rock'N' Roll Show (2005)
- Buoni O Cattivi Live Anthology (2005)
- Fronte Del Palco — Live 90 (2006)
- Gli Spari Sopra Tour (2006)
- Vasco@Olimpico.07 27.28 giugno sold out (2007)
- Vasco Rossi. Il mondo che vorrei. Live (2008)
- Live Kom 2011– The complete edition (2012)
- Live KOM 015 Live at Naples (2015)
- Il decalogo di Vasco (2015)
- Tutto in una notte – Live Kom 015 (2016)
- Vasco Modena Park (2017)
- Vascononstop Live (2019)

== Songs written for others ==
Year	Title	Song	Notes
1981	Dimmi cioè	Valentino	
1981	Sarà migliore	Valentino	
1981	Prendi e scappa	Steve Rogers Band	
1982	Neve nera	Steve Rogers Band	
1983	Domani è domenica	Valentino	
1983	Acqua e sapone	Stadio	
1984	La faccia delle donne	Stadio	
1984	Mi piaci solo tu	Valentino	
1985	Più in alto che c'è	Dodi Battaglia	
1985	Sarà migliore	Fiordaliso	
1986	Femmina come te	Steve Rogers Band	
1986	Ok sì	Steve Rogers Band	
1986	Questa sera rock'n'roll	Steve Rogers Band	
1986	Senza un alibi	Steve Rogers Band	
1988	Tu vuoi qualcosa	Stadio	
1988	Bella più che mai	Stadio	
1989	Stupidi	Stadio	
1989	Tentazioni	Sharks	
1990	Ladri d'amore	Maurizio Vandelli	
1991	Cerca di non-esser via	Stadio	
1991	Bella città	Ladri di biciclette	
1993	Ci sei tu	Massimo Riva	
1995	Ti perdonerei	Stadio	
1995	Una sgommata e via	Paola Turci	
1996	Palpito d'amore	Sabrina Salerno	
1997	...E dimmi che non-vuoi morire	Patty Pravo	
1997	Il temporale	Stadio	
1999	Lo zaino	Stadio	
2000	Sono la somma	Stadio	
2000	Una donna da sognare	Patty Pravo	
2000	Sparami al cuore	Patty Pravo	
2000	La tua ragazza sempre	Irene Grandi	
2003	Prima di partire per un lungo viaggio	Irene Grandi	
2004	Giorni	Simone Tomassini	
2005	Benedetta passione	Laura Pausini	
2011	Vuoto a perdere	Noemi	
2012	La luna	Patty Pravo	
2019	Io sono bella	Emma	
2020	Finalmente io	Irene Grandi	
2024	Libera e se mi va	Denise Faro	
2025	Meravigliosa	Guè feat. Stadio	

== Concert tours ==
- Buoni o Cattivi Tour (2004–05)
- Vasco Live 2007 (2007)
- Vasco.08 Live in concert (2008)
- Tour Europe indoor (2009–10)
- Vasco Live Kom '011 (2011)
- Vasco Live Kom '013 (2013)
- Vasco Live Kom '014 (2014)
- Vasco Live Kom '015 (2015–16)
- Modena Park 2017 (2017) in Parco Enzo Ferrari in Modena, Italy, with 225,173 tickets sold, was the world's largest ticketed concert.
- VascoNonStop Live 2018 (2018)
- VascoNonStop Live 2019 (2019)
- VascoNonStop Festival 2020 (2020)

== Awards and nominations ==
Award	Year (Note: Indicates the year of ceremony. Each year is linked to the article about the awards held that year, wherever possible.)	Recipient(s) and nominee(s)	Category	Result	Ref.
Italian Music Awards	2001 (2nd edition)	Stupido hotel	Best Italian Album	Won	
Italian Music Awards	2001 (2nd edition)	Vasco Rossi	Best Italian Male Artist	Won	
Italian Music Awards	2001 (2nd edition)	Stupido Hotel Tour	Best Italian Tour	Won	
Italian Music Awards	2001 (2nd edition)	"Siamo soli"	Best Italian Videoclip	Nominated	
Italian Music Awards	2002	"Stupido hotel"	Best Italian Lyrics	Won	
Italian Music Awards	2002	"Stupido hotel"	Best Italian Videoclip	Nominated	
Italian Music Awards	2003	Tracks	Best Italian Album	Nominated	
Italian Music Awards	2003	Vasco Rossi	Best Italian Male Artist	Nominated	
Italian Music Awards	2003	Vasco @ S.Siro 03	Best Italian Tour	Won	
Italian Music Awards	2003	Vasco Rossi	FIMI Special Award	Won	
MTV Europe Music Awards	1998	Vasco Rossi	Best Italian Act	Nominated	
MTV Europe Music Awards	1999	Vasco Rossi	Best Italian Act	Nominated	
Premio Italiano della Musica	1999	Canzoni per me	Album of the Year	Won	
Premio Italiano della Musica	1999	Imola Autodromo Enzo Ferrari	Tour of the Year	Won	
Premio Italiano della Musica	1999	Vasco Rossi	Critics' Award	Won	
Premio Italiano della Musica	1999	"Io no"	Song of the Year	Nominated	
Premio Italiano della Musica	1999	"Io no"	Video of the Year	Nominated	
Premio Italiano della Musica	2000	Rewind '99	Tour of the Year	Won	
Premio Italiano della Musica	2002	Vasco Rossi	Male Artist of the Year	Won	
Premio Italiano della Musica	2002	Stupido hotel	Album of the Year	Won	
Premio Lunezia	1999	"Quanti anni hai"	Best Lyrics	Won	
Premio Tenco	2020	Vasco Rossi	Artist Award	Won	
Nastro d'Argento	2005	"Un senso"	Best Original Song	Won	
Nastro d'Argento	2011	"Vuoto a perdere" (as songwriter)	Best Original Song	Nominated	
