= List of number-one hits of 2014 (Italy) =

This is a list of the number-one hits of 2014 on FIMI's Italian Singles and Albums Charts.

Week	Issue date	Song	Artist	Ref.	Album	Artist	Ref.
1	6 January	"Jubel"	Klingande		Mondovisione	Ligabue	
2	13 January	"Jubel"	Klingande		High Hopes	Bruce Springsteen	
3	20 January	"Jubel"	Klingande		High Hopes	Bruce Springsteen	
4	27 January	"Jubel"	Klingande		High Hopes	Bruce Springsteen	
5	3 February	"Jubel"	Klingande		Two Fingerz V	Two Fingerz	
6	10 February	"Happy"	Pharrell Williams		Mondovisione	Ligabue	
7	17 February	"Controvento"	Arisa		Mondovisione	Ligabue	
8	24 February	"Controvento"	Arisa		Racine carrée	Stromae	
9	3 March	"Happy"	Pharrell Williams		Girl	Pharrell Williams	
10	10 March	"Happy"	Pharrell Williams		Tempo reale	Francesco Renga	
11	17 March	"Happy"	Pharrell Williams		Ma che vita la mia	Roby Facchinetti	
12	24 March	"Happy"	Pharrell Williams		'A verità	Rocco Hunt	
13	31 March	"Happy"	Pharrell Williams		'A verità	Rocco Hunt	
14	7 April	"Happy"	Pharrell Williams		L'amore comporta	Biagio Antonacci	
15	14 April	"Happy"	Pharrell Williams		L'amore comporta	Biagio Antonacci	
16	21 April	"Happy"	Pharrell Williams		Museica	Caparezza	
17	28 April	"A Sky Full of Stars"	Coldplay		Museica	Caparezza	
18	5 May	"Happy"	Pharrell Williams		Logico	Cesare Cremonini	
19	12 May	"A Sky Full of Stars"	Coldplay		Domani è un altro film	Dear Jack	
20	19 May	"A Sky Full of Stars"	Coldplay		Ghost Stories	Coldplay	
21	26 May	"Anche se fuori è inverno"	Deborah Iurato		Kepler	Gemitaiz and Madman	
22	2 June	"Weekend"	Club Dogo		Domani è un altro film	Dear Jack	
23	9 June	"Maracanã"	Emis Killa		Domani è un altro film	Dear Jack	
24	16 June	"Splendida ostinazione"	Marco Carta		Domani è un altro film	Dear Jack	
25	23 June	"Maracanã"	Emis Killa		5 Seconds of Summer	5 Seconds of Summer	
26	30 June	"A Sky Full of Stars"	Coldplay		5 Seconds of Summer	5 Seconds of Summer	
27	7 July	"Maracanã"	Emis Killa		Domani è un altro film	Dear Jack	
28	14 July	"Hideaway"	Kiesza		Domani è un altro film	Dear Jack	
29	21 July	"Fragili"	Club Dogo featuring Arisa		L'amore comporta	Biagio Antonacci	
30	28 July	"Il mio giorno più bello nel mondo"	Francesco Renga		Domani è un altro film	Dear Jack	
31	4 August	"Prayer in C"	Lilly Wood and the Prick and Robin Schulz		Senza paura	Giorgia	
32	11 August	"Prayer in C"	Lilly Wood and the Prick and Robin Schulz		Ghost Stories	Coldplay	
33	18 August	"Prayer in C"	Lilly Wood and the Prick and Robin Schulz		Ghost Stories	Coldplay	
34	25 August	"Bailando"	Enrique Iglesias featuring Sean Paul, Gente de Zona and Descemer Bueno		Ghost Stories	Coldplay	
35	1 September	"Bailando"	Enrique Iglesias featuring Sean Paul, Gente de Zona and Descemer Bueno		Rock Steady	Ensi	
36	8 September	"Bailando"	Enrique Iglesias featuring Sean Paul, Gente de Zona and Descemer Bueno		Non siamo più quelli di Mi Fist	Club Dogo	
37	15 September	"Bailando"	Enrique Iglesias featuring Sean Paul, Gente de Zona and Descemer Bueno		Il padrone della festa	Fabi Silvestri Gazzè	
38	22 September	"Bailando"	Enrique Iglesias featuring Sean Paul, Gente de Zona and Descemer Bueno		Una nave in una foresta	Subsonica	
39	29 September	"Bailando"	Enrique Iglesias featuring Sean Paul, Gente de Zona and Descemer Bueno		Pop-Hoolista	Fedez	
40	6 October	"Bailando"	Enrique Iglesias featuring Sean Paul, Gente de Zona and Descemer Bueno		Pop-Hoolista	Fedez	
41	13 October	"Bailando"	Enrique Iglesias featuring Sean Paul, Gente de Zona and Descemer Bueno		Songs of Innocence	U2	
42	20 October	"Bailando"	Enrique Iglesias featuring Sean Paul, Gente de Zona and Descemer Bueno		Songs of Innocence	U2	
43	27 October	"Bailando"	Enrique Iglesias featuring Sean Paul, Gente de Zona and Descemer Bueno		Fiorella	Fiorella Mannoia	
44	3 November	"Bailando"	Enrique Iglesias featuring Sean Paul, Gente de Zona and Descemer Bueno		Sono innocente	Vasco Rossi	
45	10 November	"Bailando"	Enrique Iglesias featuring Sean Paul, Gente de Zona and Descemer Bueno		The Endless River	Pink Floyd	
46	17 November	"Bailando"	Enrique Iglesias featuring Sean Paul, Gente de Zona and Descemer Bueno		Four	One Direction	
47	24 November	"Guerriero"	Marco Mengoni		TZN – The Best of Tiziano Ferro	Tiziano Ferro	
48	1 December	"The Reason Why"	Lorenzo Fragola		Hitalia	Gianna Nannini	
49	8 December	"The Reason Why"	Lorenzo Fragola		TZN – The Best of Tiziano Ferro	Tiziano Ferro	
50	15 December	"Magnifico"	Fedez featuring Francesca Michielin		Hitalia	Gianna Nannini	
51	22 December	"Take Me to Church"	Hozier		TZN – The Best of Tiziano Ferro	Tiziano Ferro	
52	29 December	"Take Me to Church"	Hozier		TZN – The Best of Tiziano Ferro	Tiziano Ferro	

== See also ==
- 2014 in music
- List of number-one hits in Italy
