= List of best-selling albums by year in Italy =

This is a list of best-selling albums by year in Italy. The Federation of the Italian Music Industry began publishing year-end lists for album sales in 2000. The charts are based on the cumulative total sales collected during the year from January to December.

The only albums by foreign artists to top the Italian year-end chart were 1 by The Beatles in 2000, and ÷ by Ed Sheeran in 2017. Vasco Rossi achieved five annual best-selling albums in Italy with the records Stupido hotel in 2001, Tracks in 2002, Buoni o cattivi in 2004, Vivere o niente in 2011 and Sono innocente in 2014. Other multiple toppers of the year-end chart were Eros Ramazzotti, whose albums 9 and e² were the best-selling records of 2003 and 2007, respectively, and Tiziano Ferro, which achieved the first position on the annual chart in 2009 with Alla mia età and in 2012 with L'amore è una cosa semplice. More recently, Luciano Ligabue had two annual best-selling albums in Italy, with Arrivederci, mostro! and Mondovisione being the best-selling album in 2010 and 2013, respectively, and Jovanotti achieved the same result with Safari (2008) and Lorenzo 2015 CC. (2015). The only album by a female solo artist to top the Italian annual albums chart was Laura Pausini's Io canto in 2007, while Mina achieved this result in duo with Adriano Celentano for their record Le migliori in 2016.

== 2000–2009 ==
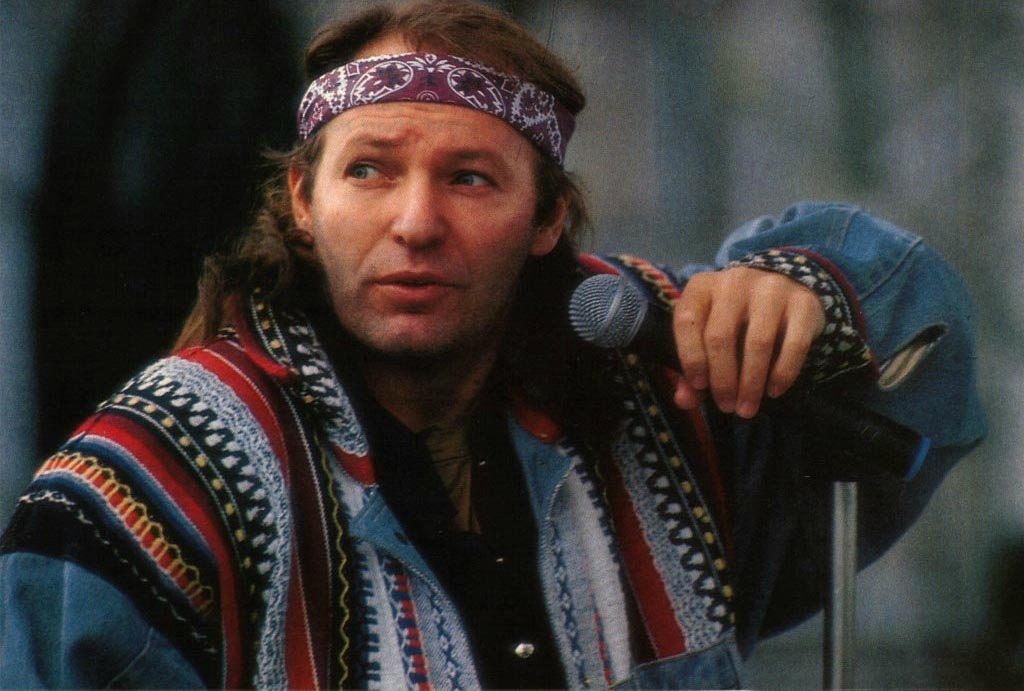
Italian rock singer Vasco Rossi had five year-end number one albums in Italy since 2000.

Year	Artist	Album	Nationality	Peak position
2000	The Beatles	1	United Kingdom	1 (9 weeks)
2001	Vasco Rossi	Stupido hotel	Italy	1 (11 weeks)
2002	Vasco Rossi	Tracks	Italy	1 (9 weeks)^{[A]}
2003	Eros Ramazzotti	9	Italy	1 (14 weeks)
2004	Vasco Rossi	Buoni o cattivi	Italy	1 (15 weeks)
2005	Biagio Antonacci	Convivendo parte 2	Italy	1 (3 weeks)
2006	Laura Pausini	Io canto	Italy	1 (8 weeks)^{[B]}
2007	Eros Ramazzotti	e²	Italy	1 (3 weeks)
2008	Jovanotti	Safari	Italy	1 (7 weeks)
2009	Tiziano Ferro	Alla mia età	Italy	1 (3 weeks)^{[C]}

== 2010–2019 ==
Year	Artist	Album	Nationality	Peak position
2010	Luciano Ligabue	Arrivederci, mostro!	Italy	1 (9 weeks)
2011	Vasco Rossi	Vivere o niente	Italy	1 (19 weeks)
2012	Tiziano Ferro	L'amore è una cosa semplice	Italy	1 (5 weeks)^{[D]}
2013	Luciano Ligabue	Mondovisione	Italy	1 (7 weeks)^{[E]}
2014	Vasco Rossi	Sono innocente	Italy	1 (1 week)
2015	Jovanotti	Lorenzo 2015 CC.	Italy	1 (4 weeks)
2016	Mina and Celentano	Le migliori	Italy	1 (5 weeks)^{[F]}
2017	Ed Sheeran	÷	United Kingdom	1 (2 weeks)
2018	Sfera Ebbasta	Rockstar	Italy	1 (4 weeks)
2019	Ultimo	Colpa delle favole	Italy	1 (5 weeks)

== 2020−present ==
Year	Artist	Album	Nationality	Peak position
2020	Marracash	Persona	Italy	1 (6 weeks)^{[G]}
2021	Rkomi	Taxi Driver	Italy	1 (6 weeks)^{[H]}
2022	Lazza	Sirio	Italy	1 (18 weeks)
2023	Geolier	Il coraggio dei bambini	Italy	1 (6 weeks)
2024	Tony Effe	Icon	Italy	1 (5 weeks)
2025	Olly	Tutta vita	Italy	1 (14 weeks)^{[I]}

== Vinyl albums ==
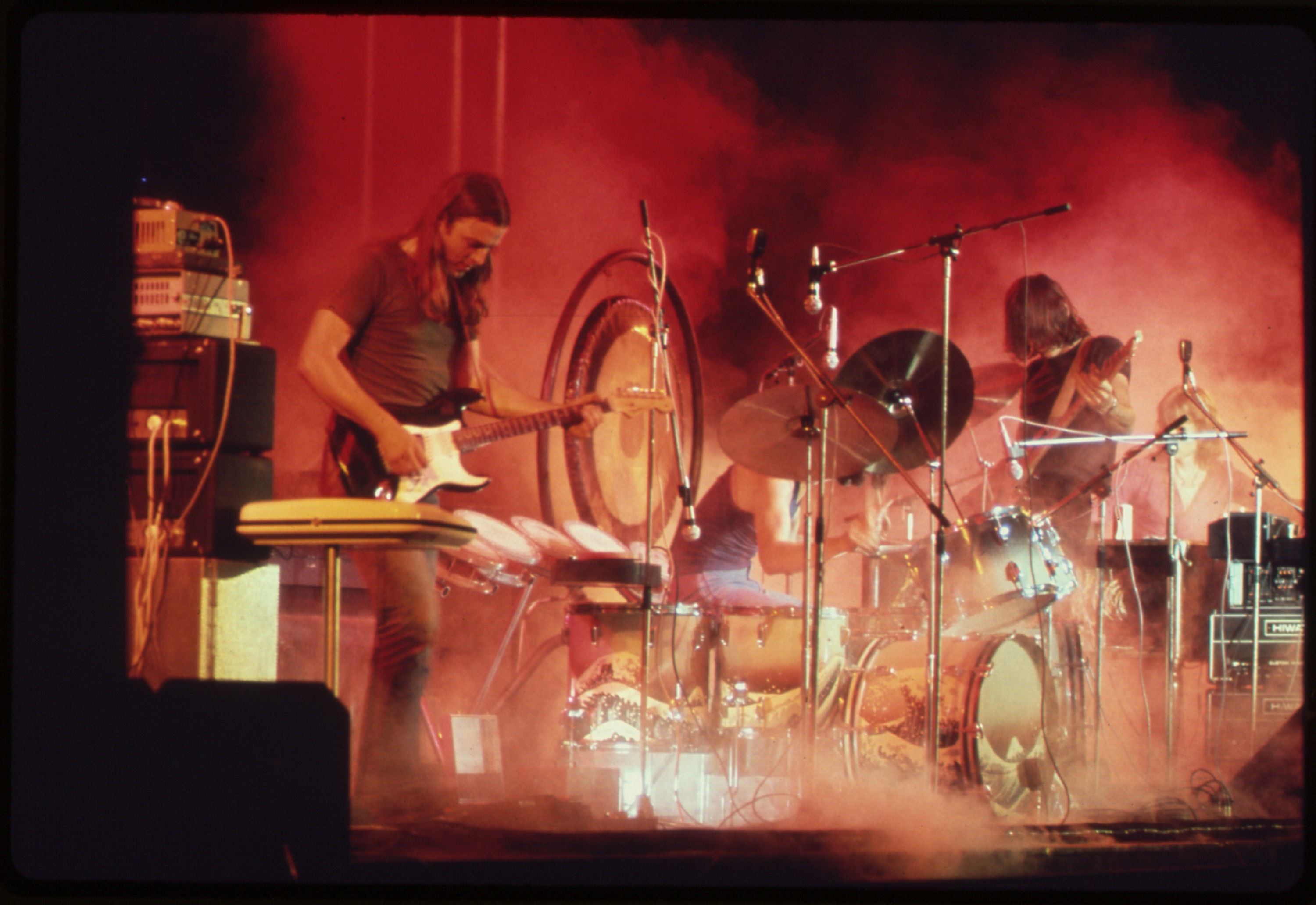
Pink Floyd's The Dark Side of the Moon was the best-selling vinyl album in Italy for five consecutive years, between 2017 and 2021, and for a sixth year in 2023.

Year	Artist	Album	Nationality
2015	David Gilmour	Rattle That Lock	United Kingdom
2016	David Bowie	Blackstar	United Kingdom
2017	Pink Floyd	The Dark Side of the Moon	United Kingdom
2018	Pink Floyd	The Dark Side of the Moon	United Kingdom
2019	Pink Floyd	The Dark Side of the Moon	United Kingdom
2020	Pink Floyd	The Dark Side of the Moon	United Kingdom
2021	Pink Floyd	The Dark Side of the Moon	United Kingdom
2022	Harry Styles	Harry's House	United Kingdom
2023	Pink Floyd	The Dark Side of the Moon	United Kingdom

== Notes ==
- A Vasco Rossi's Tracks spent five weeks atop the Italian Albums Chart in 2002 and four additional weeks at number one in 2003.
- B Laura Pausini's Io canto spent six weeks atop the Italian Albums Chart in 2006 and two additional weeks at number one in 2007.
- C Tiziano Ferro's Alla mia età spent two weeks atop the Italian Albums Chart in 2009, but it also reached number one in its debut week in 2008.
- D Tiziano Ferro's L'amore è una cosa semplice spent three weeks atop the Italian Albums Chart in 2012, but it also reached number one for two weeks in 2011.
- E Luciano Ligabue's Mondovisione spent five weeks atop the Italian Albums Chart in 2013 and two additional weeks at number one in 2014.
- F Mina & Celentano's Le migliori spent three weeks atop the Italian Albums Chart in 2016 and two additional weeks at number one in 2017.
- G Persona by Marracash spent four weeks atop the Italian Albums Chart in 2020, but it also reached number one for two weeks in 2019.
- H Taxi Driver by Rkomi spent four weeks atop the Italian Albums Chart in 2021, but it also reached number one for two weeks in 2022.
- I Tutta vita and its re-issue Tutta vita (sempre) by Olly spent twelve weeks atop the Italian Albums Chart in 2025, but the album also reached number one for one week in 2024 and, as of 6 January 2026, it spent an additional week atop the chart in 2026.
