= Michele Canova =

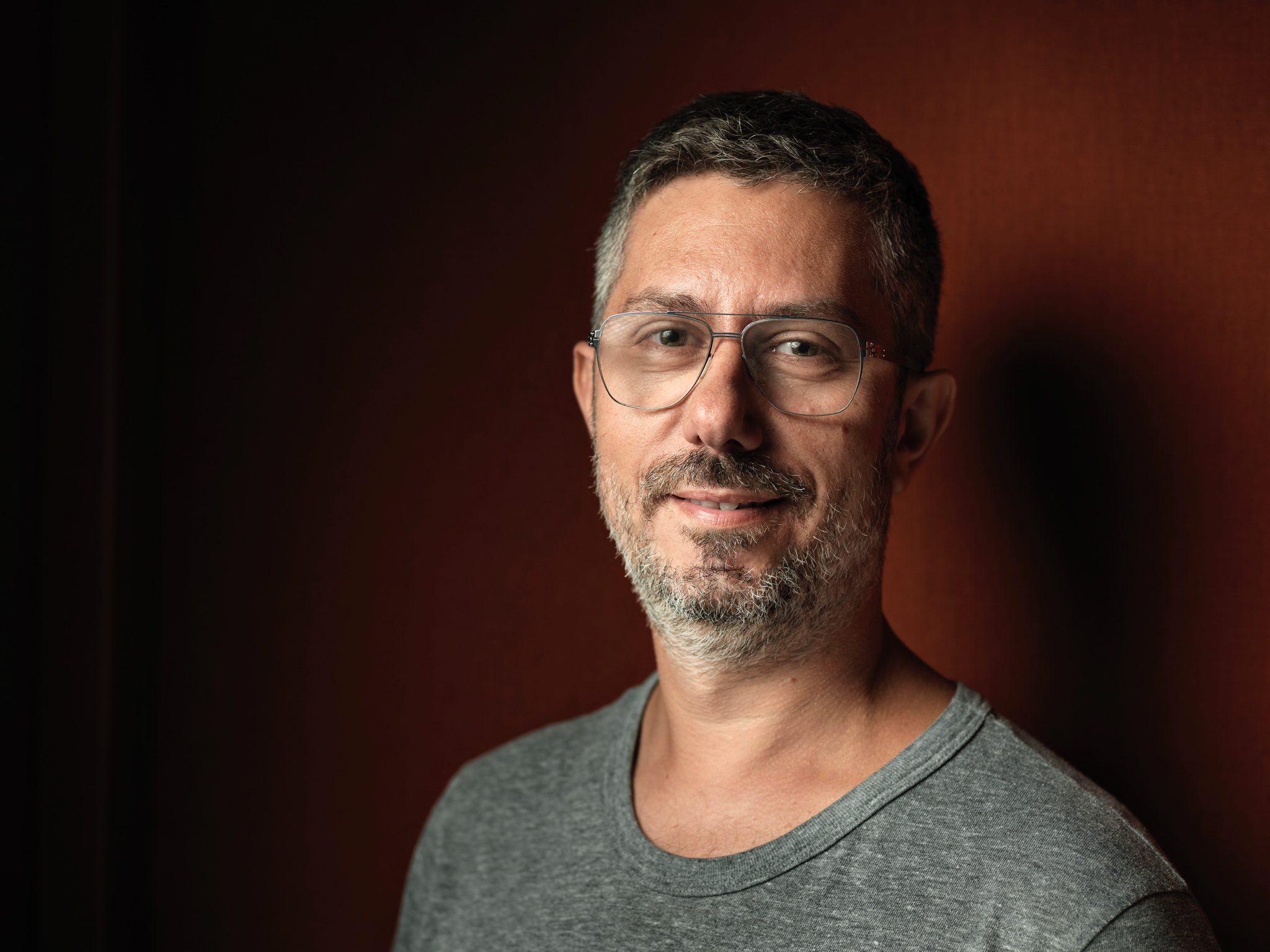
- Canova in 2018

Background information
- Born: Michele Canova Iorfida; 22 June 1972 (age 54); Padua, Italy
- Origin: Italy
- Genres: Pop; hip-hop/rap
- Occupations: Producer; songwriter; audio engineer
- Label: Sony ATV Worldwide

Michele Canova Iorfida (born 22 June 1972), also known mononymously as Canova (stylized CanovA) is an Italian record producer, arranger, songwriter and engineer. Since 2003, Iorfida has been responsible for more than 18 million album sales worldwide. His work with artists including Jovanotti, Tiziano Ferro, and Giusy Ferreri has resulted in 7 Diamond, 15 Multi Platinum, and 10 Platinum FIMI certifications

In December 2012, Canova signed to Sony ATV worldwide publishing as a songwriter. In 2013, he moved to Los Angeles to build out a second music studio in North Hollywood, focusing on his career in the United States.

As a songwriter in Italy, he has worked alongside Jovanotti, Tiziano Ferro, Fabri Fibra, Giorgia, Dark Polo Gang, and Fedez, topping the Italian single charts (according to Nielsen).

He has also produced tracks in the United States featuring artists such as John Legend, Alicia Keys, Olly Murs and Kelly Rowland.

His production credits include work with Italian artists such as Tiziano Ferro (all albums), Jovanotti (Buon Sangue, Safari, Ora), Eros Ramazzotti (songs on 9, Calma Apparente, E2, and Ali e Radici), Fabri Fibra (Controcultura: Vip in trip, Tranne te, Qualcuno Normale, Le donne), Giorgia (Dietro le apparenze), Biagio Antonacci, Giusy Ferreri (Gaetana and Fotografie), Adriano Celentano, Max Pezzali, Loredana Errore, Gianni Morandi, and Latin artists such as Ha ash (4 songs on A tiempo in 2011).

== Album highlights (Italy) ==
Noteworthy Works by Artist & Year
Tiziano Ferro
2001	Rosso Relativo (Rojo Relativo)
2003	Centoundici
2006	Nessuno è solo (Nadie esta solo)
2008	Alla mia età (A mi edad)
2011	L′amore è una cosa semplice (El amor es una cosa simple)
2014	TZN – The Best of Tiziano Ferro
2016	Il mestiere della vita (El ofício de la vida)
Jovanotti
2005	Buon Sangue
2007	Safari
2011	Ora
2012	Backup
2015	Lorenzo 2015 cc.
Fabri Fibra
2010	Controcultura ("Vip in trip", "Qualcuno normale", "Tranne te, Le donne")
2013	Guerra e Pace (various songs)
Ghali
2020	DNA ("Barcellona", "Dna", "Fallito", "Cuore a destra")
Elettra Lamborghini
2020	"Fanfare","Musica (e il resto scompare)"
Giorgia
2011	Dietro le apparenze
2013	Senza Paura
2016	Oronero
2018	Pop Heart
Eros Ramazzotti
2003	Nove (3 songs)
2005	Calma apparente (3 songs)
2009	Ali e radici (6 songs)
Marco Mengoni
2013	#prontoacorrere
2015	Parole in circolo
2015	Le cose che non-ho
Giusy Ferreri
2008	Gaetana
2009	Fotografie
Adriano Celentano
2004	C′è sempre un motivo (3 songs)
2007	Dormi amore, la situazione non è buona (1 song)
2011	Facciamo finta che sia vero (5 songs)
Biagio Antonacci
2010	Inaspettata ("Se fosse per sempre", "Buongiorno bell′anima", "La rarità")
2012	Sapessi dire no
2014	L'amore comporta
2015	Best of Biagio Antonacci
Francesco Renga
2014	Tempo Reale
2016	Scrivero' il tuo nome
2019	L'altra meta'
Luca Carboni
2013	Fisico e Politico
2015	Pop Up
2018	Sputnik
Francesca Michielin
2015	di20
2018	2640
Elisa
2016	ON ("Bruciare per te")
Baby K
2013	Una seria
Nina Zilli
2012	L'amore e' femmina
2017	Modern Art
Loredana Errore
2010	Ragazza Occhi Cielo
Dark Polo Gang
2018	Trap Lovers
Fedez
2019	Paranoia Airlines
Il Volo
2019	Musica
Alessandra Amoroso
2013	Amore Puro
2016	Vivere a colori (5 songs).
Benji & Fede
2018	Siamo Solo Noise (4 songs)
Annalisa
2018	Bye Bye
2020	Nuda
Gianna Nannini
2018	Amore Gigante
Wrongonyou
2018	Rebirth

== Song highlights (United States) ==
Noteworthy U.S. Releases
Artist	Title	Year	Role
Janet Jackson x Daddy Yankee	"Made For Now (Benny Benassi x Canova Remix)"	2018	Production
Lostboy feat. Gnash	"Insecure"	2020	Co-writer, Production, Mixing
Denise Rosenthal feat. Lola Indigo	"Demente"	2021	Co-writer
IMY2	"Kiss","Breakfast in Bed","Don't call me","Bubblegum"	2021	Co-writer, Production, Mixing
Marieme	"The Kids are not fine"	2021	Co-writer, Production, Mixing
Devenity Perkins	"Put me out"	2020	Co-writer, Production, Mixing
Kemper Sisters	"Endless Vacation"	2020	Co-writer, Production, Mixing
James Maslow feat. Dominique	"All Day"	2018	Production, Mixing
James Maslow feat. Dominique	"All Day (Benny Benassi/Reech/Canova Remix)"	2018	Production
Lola Coca	"A World Without Love (Instant Love)"	2018	Production
Dominique	"Convince You"	2018	Mixing
Arguello feat. Brandyn Burnette	"Forever"	2017	Additional Production, Mixing
Nikki Flores	"Just Rain"	2015	Co-Writer, Production, Mixing
Nikki Flores	"Home"	2014	Co-Writer, Production, Mixing
Austin Christopher	"Sheets Don't Lie"	N/A	Production, Mixing

== Album highlights (Spanish) ==
Artist	Title	Year	Role
Ha*Ash x Río Roma	"Camina Conmigo (Solo x Remix)"	2011	Production
Ha*Ash	"¿De Dónde Sacas Eso?"	2011	Production, arranger
Ha*Ash	"Te Amo Más Que Ayer"	2011	Production
Ha*Ash	"Sólo Una Vez"	2011	Production

== Appearances ==
=== Waves Audio ===
SoundGrid in the Studio: Amazing Hybrid Studio Tour (2018)

=== Plugin Alliance ===
Michele Canova Iorfida – Artist Focus (2017)

==== Pensado's Show ====
Michele's Studio Tour – Into the Lair #161 (2017)

Producer Michele Iorfida – Pensado's Place #303 (2017)

=== Produce like a Pro ===
Dave Pensado Interview & Fab Factory Studio Tour – Warren Huart: Produce Like a Pro (2018)

=== TEDxCortina ===
Michele Canova – Produttore musicale e CEO di Canova LLC

Canova was a speaker at TedxCortina 2018, speaking about the connections between Music & Technology.

== Awards and nominations ==
Canova is the recipient of several awards since becoming active in 2003:

2007: Won Top Grossing Record of the Year, Tiziano Ferro's 'Nessuno è solo', Italy

2008: Won Top Grossing Record of the Year, Jovanotti's 'Safari', Italy

2009: Won Top Grossing Record of the Year, Italy, Tiziano Ferro's 'Alla mia età', Italy

2012: Won Top Grossing Record of the Year, Italy, Tiziano Ferro's 'L'amore e' una cosa semplice', Italy

2013: Nominated for 2 Latin Grammys (one with Tiziano Ferro, one with Miguel Bosé)

2015: Won Top Grossing Record of the Year, Jovanotti's 'Lorenzo' (2nd place with Tiziano Ferro's 'Best of TZN', 5th place with Marco Megoni's 'Parole in Circolo', and 8th place with Marco Mengoni's 'Le cose che non-ho), Italy

List of notable co-writes & associated certifications
Title	Year	Certifications	Album
"Vip in Trip"^{(Fabri Fibra)}	2010	FIMI: Platinum	Controcultura
"Tutto l'amore che ho"^{(Jovanotti)}	2011	Fimi: 3× Platinum	Ora
"Ora"^{(Jovanotti)}	2011	FIMI: Gold	Ora
"La notte dei desideri"^{(Jovanotti)}	2011	FIMI: Platinum	Ora
"Tensione evolutiva"^{(Jovanotti)}	2013	Fimi: Platinum	Lorenzo Negli Stadi Backup Tour 2013
"Ti porto via con me"^{(Jovanotti)}	2013	Fimi: Platinum	Lorenzo Negli Stadi Backup Tour 2013
"Fisico Politico"^{(Luca Carboni)}	2013	FIMI: Gold	Fisico & Politico
"Killer"^{(Baby K feat. Tiziano Ferro)}	2013	Fimi: Platinum	Una seria
"Pronti Partenza Via!"^{(Fabri Fibra)}	2013	FIMI: Platinum	Guerra e pace
"Guerriero"^{(Marco Mengoni)}	2015	FIMI: 5× Platinum	Parole in circolo
"L'amore esiste"^{(Francesca Michielin)}	2015	FIMI: 2× Platinum	di20
"Sconosciuti da una vita"^{(J-Ax & Fedez)}	2017	FIMI: 2× Platinum	Comunisti col Rolex

=== Awards (w/ Tiziano Ferro) ===
World Music Awards

- 2010: Italian best-selling male of the year 2009

MTV Europe Music Awards

- 2004: Miglior artista italiano
- 2006: Miglior artista italiano

TRL Awards – MTV Italia

- 2007: Man of the year
- 2007: Best riempi-piazza
- 2008: Man of the year

Wind Music Awards

- 2007: Premio per l'album Nessuno è solo
- 2009: Premio per l'album Alla mia età
- 2010: Premio per il DVD Alla mia età – Live in Rome

Kids' Choice Awards

- 2006: Miglior cantante italiano
- 2007: Miglior cantante italiano

Other awards

- 2002: Premio Italiano della Musica come Artista rivelazione del 2001
- 2002: Miglior artista uomo al Festival di San Marino
- 2002: Miglior album Rosso relativo al Festival di San Marino
- 2002: Miglior Artista Esordiente al Festivalbar
- 2004: Premios Oye! come Miglior cantante Pop Latino maschile con l'album 111 Ciento once
- 2004: Billboard Latin Music Awards come miglior brano Pop Latino dell'anno con il brano Alucinado
- 2007: Giffoni Teen Award come personaggio italiano della musica
- 2009: Premio Videoclip Italiano come Miglior video dell'anno – categoria artista uomo con il videoclip Il regalo più grande
- 2010: Premio Dial 2009 come miglior canzone dell'anno in Spagna con il brano El regalo màs grande
- 2010: Italian Best-Selling Male Artist of the Year 2009 ai World Music Awards

Un-assignet awards

- 2002: Nomination al Premio Italiano della Musica (PIM) come Canzone italiana dell'anno con il brano Xdono
- 2002: Nomination agli MTV Europe Music Awards come Miglior artista italiano
- 2002: Nomination agli Italian Music Awards come Miglior album con Rosso relativo
- 2002: Nomination agli Italian Music Awards come Miglior artista maschile
- 2002: Nomination agli Italian Music Awards come Miglior singolo con Rosso relativo
- 2003: Nomination ai Latin Grammy Awards come Miglior esordiente, con Rosso relativo
- 2004: Nomination ai Billboard Latin Music Awards come Miglior album dell'anno Rojo relativo
- 2005: Nomination agli MTV Latin Music Awards come Miglior artista italiano
- 2005: Nomination ai Mexican Grammy Awards come Miglior artista maschile
- 2006: Nomination agli MTV Europe Music Awards come Miglior artista italiano
- 2006: Nomination al Premios Orgullosamente Latino come Video Latino dell'anno con il brano Mi credo
- 2006: Nomination al Premios Orgullosamente Latino come Canzone Latina dell'anno con il brano Mi credo
- 2006: Nomination al Premios Orgullosamente Latino come Gruppo Latino dell'anno (Tiziano Ferro e Pepe Aguilar)
- 2006: Nomination agli MTV Latin Music Awards come Miglior solista
- 2007: Nomination al Premios Orgullosamente Latino come solista dell'anno
- 2007: Nomination al Premios Orgullosamente Latino come canzone Latina dell'anno
- 2008: Nomination al Premios Orgullosamente Latino come solista dell'anno
