= Ligabue discography =

Luciano Ligabue discography
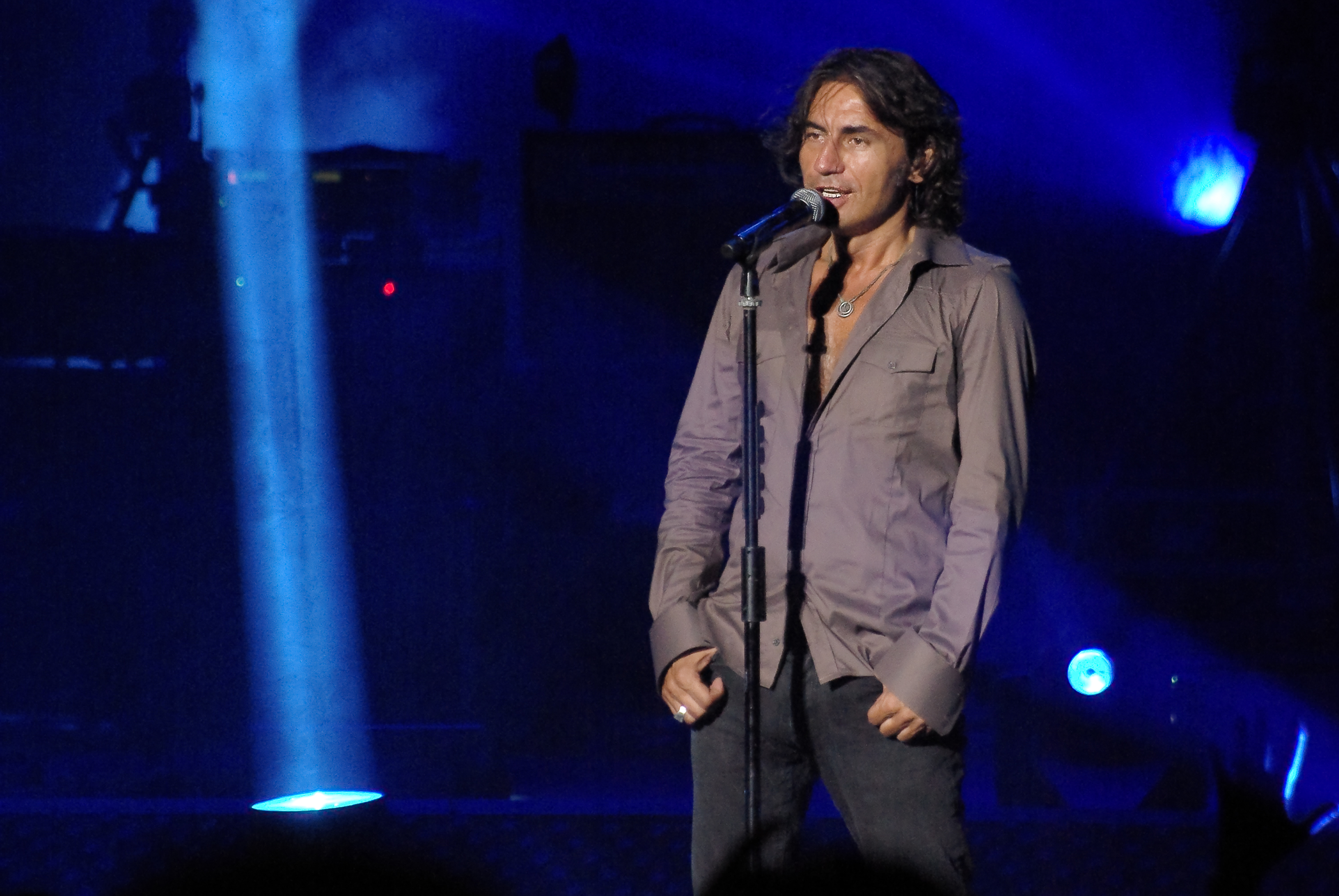
- Ligabue while performing in Verona, 19 September 2009
- Studio albums: 14
- Soundtrack albums: 1
- Live albums: 5
- Compilation albums: 2
- Singles: 72

The discography of Ligabue, the Italian rock-singer Luciano Ligabue, consists of fourteen studio albums, two compilation albums, one soundtrack albums, five live albums, sixty-six singles as a lead artist and four singles as a featured artist.

== Albums ==
=== Studio albums ===
List of albums, with selected chart positions, sales, and certifications
Title	Album details	Peak chart positions			Certifications
Title	Album details	ITA FIMI	ITA M&D	SWI	Certifications
Ligabue	Released: 11 May 1990; Label: WEA Italy; Formats: LP, Musicassette, CD	11	12	—	ITA: 5× Platinum
Lambrusco coltelli rose & popcorn	Released: 20 September 1991; Label: WEA Italy; Formats: LP, Musicassette, CD	21	7	—	ITA: 5× Platinum
Sopravvissuti e sopravviventi	Released: 22 January 1993; Label: WEA Italy; Formats: LP, Musicassette, CD	27	3	—	ITA: 4× Platinum
A che ora è la fine del mondo?	Released: 28 October 1994; Label: WEA Italy; Formats: Musicassette, CD	24	6	—	ITA: 3× Platinum
Buon compleanno Elvis	Released: 21 September 1995; Label: WEA Italy; Formats: Musicassette, CD, 2× LP	1	2	—	ITA: 10× Platinum; EU: Platinum
Miss Mondo	Released: 17 September 1999; Label: WEA; Formats: Musicassette, CD, 2× LP	1	1	—	ITA: 5× Platinum
Fuori come va?	Released: 26 April 2002; Label: WEA; Formats: CD, Musicassette, 2× LP	1	1	18	ITA: 5× Platinum
Nome e cognome	Released: 16 September 2005; Labels: Warner Bros. Records; Formats: CD, LP, download	1	1	20	ITA: 5× Platinum
Arrivederci, mostro!	Released: 11 May 2010; Label: Warner Bros. Records; Formats: CD, LP, download	1	1	11	ITA: Diamond
Mondovisione	Released: 26 November 2013; Label: Warner Bros. Records; Formats: CD, LP, download	1	1	21	ITA: 7× Platinum
Made in Italy	Released: 18 November 2016; Label: Warner Bros.; Formats: CD, LP, download	1	1	14	ITA: 3× Platinum
Start	Released: 8 March 2019; Label: Warner Bros.; Formats: CD, LP, download	1	—N/a	7	ITA: 2× Platinum
7	Released: 4 December 2020; Label: Warner Bros.; Formats: CD, LP, download	1	—N/a	62	ITA: Platinum
Dedicato a noi	Released: 21 September 2023; Label: Warner Italy; Formats: CD, LP, download	1	—N/a	—	ITA: Gold
"—" denotes albums that did not chart or were not released.

=== Soundtracks ===
List of albums, with selected chart positions, sales, and certifications
Title	Album details	Peak positions			Certifications
Title	Album details	ITA FIMI Comp	ITA FIMI	ITA M&D	Certifications
Radiofreccia	Released: 8 October 1998; Label: WEA; Formats: CD, 2× CD, Musicassette, 2× Musicassette	1^{*}	34	3	ITA: 3× Platinum

Notes

- ^{*} "Radiofreccia" reached #1 on the Italian FIMI Compilations Chart in 1998. Album Chart peak position is from 2018.

=== Compilation albums ===
List of albums, with selected chart positions, sales, and certifications
Title	Album details	Peak chart positions			Certifications
Title	Album details	ITA FIMI	ITA M&D	SWI	Certifications
Primo tempo	Released: 16 November 2007; Labels: WEA; Formats: CD, CD+DVD, download	1	1	49	ITA: 3× Platinum
Secondo tempo	Released: 30 May 2008; Labels: WEA; Formats: CD, CD+DVD, download	1	1	26	ITA: 4× Platinum
77+7 - Settantasette Singoli + Sette	Released: 4 December 2020; Labels: Warner Records; Formats: CD, LP, Box Set	26	—N/a	—	
"—" denotes albums that did not chart or were not released.

=== Live albums ===
List of albums, with selected chart positions, sales, and certifications
Title	Album details	Peak chart positions			Certifications
Title	Album details	ITA FIMI	ITA M&D	SWI	Certifications
Su e giù da un palco	Released: 8 May 1997; Labels: WEA; Formats: 2× CD, 2× Musicassette, 3× LP	1	1	—	ITA: 10× Platinum
Giro d'Italia	Released: 21 November 2003; Labels: Wea; Formats: 2× CD, 2× Musicassette, 3× CD	1	1	96	
Sette notti in Arena	Released: 5 June 2009; Labels: Warner Bros. Records; Formats: CD+DVD, Blu-ray Disc, download	2	2	85	ITA: 2× Platinum
Campovolo 2.011	Released: 22 November 2011; Labels: Warner Bros. Records; Formats: 3× CD, 4× LP, download	1	1	—	ITA: 3× Platinum
Giro del mondo	Released: 14 April 2015; Labels: Warner Bros. Records; Formats: 2× CD+DVD	1	1	—	ITA: 2× Platinum
"—" denotes albums that did not chart or were not released.

== Singles ==
=== As lead singer ===
List of singles, with chart positions, year released, certifications and album name
Single	Year	Peak chart positions		Certifications	Album
Single	Year	ITA	EU	Certifications	Album
"Anime in plexiglass" / "Bar Mario" (as member of the band Ora Zero)	1987	—	—		Non-album single
"Balliamo sul mondo"	1990	—	—	ITA: Gold	Ligabue
"Figlio d'un cane"	1990	35	—		Ligabue
"Marlon Brando è sempre lui"	1990	—	—		Ligabue
"Non è tempo per noi"	1990	—	—	ITA: Platinum	Ligabue
"Libera nos a malo"	1991	—	—		Lambrusco coltelli rose & popcorn
"Lambrusco & pop corn"	1991	—	—		Lambrusco coltelli rose & popcorn
"Urlando contro il cielo"	1992	29	—	ITA: Platinum	Lambrusco coltelli rose & popcorn
"Ancora in piedi"	1993	—	—		Sopravvissuti e sopravviventi
"Ho messo via"	1993	—	—	ITA: Platinum	Sopravvissuti e sopravviventi
"Piccola città eterna"	1993	—	—		Sopravvissuti e sopravviventi
"Quando tocca a te"	1993	—	—		Sopravvissuti e sopravviventi
"Lo zoo è qui"	1993	—	—		Sopravvissuti e sopravviventi
"A che ora è la fine del mondo?"	1994	—	—		A che ora è la fine del mondo?
"Cerca nel cuore"	1994	—	—		A che ora è la fine del mondo?
"Certe notti"	1995	14	—	ITA: 3× Platinum	Buon compleanno Elvis
"Seduto in riva al fosso"	1995	—	—		Buon compleanno Elvis
"Viva!"	1995	—	—		Buon compleanno Elvis
"Hai un momento Dio?"	1995	—	—		Buon compleanno Elvis
"Vivo morto o X"	1996	—	—		Buon compleanno Elvis
"Leggero"	1996	—	—	ITA: Gold	Buon compleanno Elvis
"Il giorno di dolore che uno ha"	1997	—	—		Su e giù da un palco
"Tra palco e realtà"	1997	—	—		Su e giù da un palco
"Ho perso le parole"	1998	—	—	ITA: Gold	Radiofreccia
"Metti in circolo il tuo amore"	1998	—	—		Radiofreccia
"Una vita da mediano"	1999	3	—	ITA: Gold	Miss Mondo
"L'odore del sesso"	1999	—	—	ITA: Gold	Miss Mondo
"Almeno credo"	1999	—	—		Miss Mondo
"Si viene e si va"	2000	—	—		Miss Mondo
"Sulla mia strada"	2000	—	—		Miss Mondo
"Questa è la mia vita"	2002	1	—	ITA: Platinum	Fuori come va?
"Tutti vogliono viaggiare in prima"	2002	—	—		Fuori come va?
"Eri bellissima"	2002	—	—	ITA: Gold	Fuori come va?
"Ti sento"	2002	—	—	ITA: Gold	Fuori come va?
"Voglio volere"	2002	—	—		Fuori come va?
"Piccola stella senza cielo"	2003	—	—	ITA: Platinum	Giro d'Italia
"Tutte le strade portano a te"	2003	—	—		Giro d'Italia
"Il giorno dei giorni"	2005	—	—		Nome e cognome
"L'amore conta"	2005	—	—	ITA: Gold	Nome e cognome
"Le donne lo sanno"	2006	—	—	ITA: Gold	Nome e cognome
"Happy Hour"	2006	10	—	ITA: Gold	Nome e cognome
"Cosa vuoi che sia"	2006	—	—		Nome e cognome
"Sono qui per l'amore"	2006	—	—		Nome e cognome
"Niente paura"	2007	1	94	ITA: Gold	Primo tempo
"Buonanotte all'Italia"	2007	22	—		Primo tempo
"Il centro del mondo"	2008	3	—		Secondo tempo
"Il mio pensiero"	2008	6	—		Secondo tempo
"Non è tempo per noi" (Live)	2009	—	—	ITA: Gold	Sette notti in Arena
"Sulla mia strada" (Live)	2009	16	—		Sette notti in Arena
"Un colpo all'anima"	2010	1	—	ITA: Platinum	Arrivederci, mostro!
"Quando canterai la tua canzone"	2010	46	—		Arrivederci, mostro!
"La linea sottile"	2010	36	—		Arrivederci, mostro!
"Ci sei sempre stata"	2010	24	—	ITA: Gold	Arrivederci, mostro!
"Il meglio deve ancora venire"	2011	29	—		Arrivederci, mostro!
"Il peso della valigia"	2011	42	—		Arrivederci, mostro!
"Ora e allora"	2011	7	—	ITA: Gold	Campovolo 2.011
"M'abituerò"	2012	22	—	ITA: Gold	Campovolo 2.011
"Sotto bombardamento"	2012	45	—		Campovolo 2.011
"Il sale della terra"	2013	2	—	ITA: Platinum	Mondovisione
"Tu sei lei"	2013	4	—	ITA: Platinum	Mondovisione
"Per sempre"	2014	24	—	ITA: Gold	Mondovisione
"Il muro del suono"	2014	48	—	ITA: Gold	Mondovisione
"Siamo chi siamo"	2014	38	—	ITA: Platinum	Mondovisione
"Sono sempre i sogni a dare forma al mondo"	2014	46	—	ITA: Platinum	Mondovisione
"C'è sempre una canzone"	2015	24	—	ITA: Platinum	Giro del mondo
"Non ho che te"	2015	80	—	ITA: Gold	Giro del mondo
"A modo tuo"	2015	58	—	ITA: Platinum	Giro del mondo
"G come giungla"	2016	30	—	ITA: Gold	Made in Italy
"Made in Italy"	2016	—	—	ITA: Gold	Made in Italy
"È venerdì, non mi rompete i coglioni"	2017	—	—		Made in Italy
"Ho fatto in tempo ad avere un futuro (che non fosse soltanto per me)"	2017	—	—		Made in Italy
"Luci d'America"	2019	7	—	ITA: Gold	Start
"Certe donne brillano"	2019	16	—	ITA: Gold	Start
"Polvere di stelle"	2019	87	—		Start
"Mai dire mai"	2020	91	—		Start
"La ragazza dei tuoi sogni"	2020	44	—		7
"Volente o nolente" (featuring Elisa)	2020	60	—	ITA: Gold	7
"—" denotes singles that did not chart or were not released.

=== As featured artist ===
List of singles, with chart positions in Italy, showing year released and album name
Single	Year	Peak chart positions	Certification	Album
Single	Year	ITA	Certification	Album
"Il mio nome è mai più" (Luciano Ligabue, Jovanotti & Piero Pelù)	1999	1	ITA: 10× Platinum	Charity single
"Gli ostacoli del cuore" (Elisa feat. Ligabue)	2006	1^{x}	ITA: Platinum	Soundtrack '96–'06
"Domani 21/04.09" (Artisti Uniti per l'Abruzzo)	2009	1	ITA: 2× Platinum	Charity single
"A muso duro" (Italia Loves Emilia)	2012	20		Italia Loves Emilia - Il concerto

Notes

- ^{x} "Gli ostacoli del cuore" entered the Italian FIMI Top Digital Download, not the Italian FIMI Singles Chart.

=== Other charted songs ===
List of songs, with chart positions in Italy, showing year released and album name
Title	Year	Peak chart positions	Album
Title	Year	ITA	Album
"La neve se ne frega"	2013	63	Mondovisione
"Ciò che rimane di noi"	2013	91	Mondovisione
"Il volume delle tue bugie"	2013	100	Mondovisione
