= List of number-one hits of 2012 (Italy) =

This is a list of the number-one hits of 2012 on FIMI's Italian Singles and Albums Charts.

Week	Issue date	Song	Artist	Ref	Album	Artist	Ref
1	2 January	"Distratto"	Francesca Michielin		L'amore è una cosa semplice	Tiziano Ferro	
2	9 January	"Ai Se Eu Te Pego!"	Michel Teló		L'amore è una cosa semplice	Tiziano Ferro	
3	16 January	"Ai Se Eu Te Pego!"	Michel Teló		Grande nazione	Litfiba	
4	23 January	"Ai Se Eu Te Pego!"	Michel Teló		21	Adele	
5	30 January	"Ai Se Eu Te Pego!"	Michel Teló		21	Adele	
6	6 February	"Ai Se Eu Te Pego!"	Michel Teló		Up All Night	One Direction	
7	13 February	"Non è l'inferno"	Emma		21	Adele	
8	20 February	"La notte"	Arisa		Sarò libera	Emma	
9	27 February	"La notte"	Arisa		12000 lune	Lucio Dalla	
10	5 March	"La notte"	Arisa		Wrecking Ball	Bruce Springsteen	
11	12 March	"La notte"	Arisa		12000 lune	Lucio Dalla	
12	19 March	"Somebody That I Used to Know"	Gotye featuring Kimbra		12000 lune	Lucio Dalla	
13	26 March	"Somebody That I Used to Know"	Gotye featuring Kimbra		MDNA	Madonna	
14	2 April	"Somebody That I Used to Know"	Gotye featuring Kimbra		L'altra metà del cielo	Vasco Rossi	
15	9 April	"Somebody That I Used to Know"	Gotye featuring Kimbra		L'altra metà del cielo	Vasco Rossi	
16	16 April	"Somebody That I Used to Know"	Gotye featuring Kimbra		Sapessi dire no	Biagio Antonacci	
17	23 April	"Somebody That I Used to Know"	Gotye featuring Kimbra		Sapessi dire no	Biagio Antonacci	
18	30 April	"Somebody That I Used to Know"	Gotye featuring Kimbra		Sapessi dire no	Biagio Antonacci	
19	7 May	"Somebody That I Used to Know"	Gotye featuring Kimbra		Sapessi dire no	Biagio Antonacci	
20	14 May	"Cercavo amore"	Emma		Sapessi dire no	Biagio Antonacci	
21	21 May	"Cercavo amore"	Emma		Ancora di più – Cinque passi in più	Alessandra Amoroso	
22	28 May	"Payphone"	Maroon 5 featuring Wiz Khalifa		Ancora di più – Cinque passi in più	Alessandra Amoroso	
23	4 June	"Balada (Tchê Tcherere Tchê Tchê)"	Gusttavo Lima		Noi siamo il Club	Club Dogo	
24	11 June	"Balada (Tchê Tcherere Tchê Tchê)"	Gusttavo Lima		Hanno ucciso l'Uomo Ragno 2012	Max Pezzali and 883	
25	18 June	"Balada (Tchê Tcherere Tchê Tchê)"	Gusttavo Lima		Believe	Justin Bieber	
26	25 June	"Balada (Tchê Tcherere Tchê Tchê)"	Gusttavo Lima		Living Things	Linkin Park	
27	2 July	"Balada (Tchê Tcherere Tchê Tchê)"	Gusttavo Lima		Living Things	Linkin Park	
28	9 July	"Balada (Tchê Tcherere Tchê Tchê)"	Gusttavo Lima		Sapessi dire no	Biagio Antonacci	
29	16 July	"Balada (Tchê Tcherere Tchê Tchê)"	Gusttavo Lima		Sapessi dire no	Biagio Antonacci	
30	23 July	"Balada (Tchê Tcherere Tchê Tchê)"	Gusttavo Lima		Sapessi dire no	Biagio Antonacci	
31	30 July	"Balada (Tchê Tcherere Tchê Tchê)"	Gusttavo Lima		Sapessi dire no	Biagio Antonacci	
32	6 August	"Balada (Tchê Tcherere Tchê Tchê)"	Gusttavo Lima		Sapessi dire no	Biagio Antonacci	
33	13 August	"Balada (Tchê Tcherere Tchê Tchê)"	Gusttavo Lima		Sapessi dire no	Biagio Antonacci	
34	20 August	"Il Pulcino Pio"	Pulcino Pio		Sapessi dire no	Biagio Antonacci	
35	27 August	"Il Pulcino Pio"	Pulcino Pio		Havoc and Bright Lights	Alanis Morissette	
36	3 September	"Il Pulcino Pio"	Pulcino Pio		Nesliving Vol. 3 – Voglio	Nesli	
37	10 September	"Il Pulcino Pio"	Pulcino Pio		Tutto da capo	Gemelli Diversi	
38	17 September	"Il Pulcino Pio"	Pulcino Pio		Bad 25	Michael Jackson	
39	24 September	"Il Pulcino Pio"	Pulcino Pio		¡Uno!	Green Day	
40	1 October	"Il Pulcino Pio"	Pulcino Pio		The 2nd Law	Muse	
41	8 October	"Il Pulcino Pio"	Pulcino Pio		The 2nd Law	Muse	
42	15 October	"One Day / Reckoning Song" (Wankelmut Rmx)	Asaf Avidan		The 2nd Law	Muse	
43	22 October	"One Day / Reckoning Song" (Wankelmut Rmx)	Asaf Avidan		Apriti sesamo	Franco Battiato	
44	29 October	"Skyfall"	Adele		Apriti sesamo	Franco Battiato	
45	5 November	"Skyfall"	Adele		Una storia semplice	Negramaro	
46	12 November	"Skyfall"	Adele		Take Me Home	One Direction	
47	19 November	"Skyfall"	Adele		Noi	Eros Ramazzotti	
48	26 November	"Gangnam Style"	Psy		Live Kom 011: The Complete Edition	Vasco Rossi	
49	3 December	"Due respiri"	Chiara		Backup 1987–2012	Jovanotti	
50	10 December	"Due respiri"	Chiara		La sesión cubana	Zucchero	
51	17 December	"Due respiri"	Chiara		Backup 1987–2012	Jovanotti	
52	24 December	"Scream & Shout"	will.i.am featuring Britney Spears		Backup 1987–2012	Jovanotti	
53	31 December	"Scream & Shout"	will.i.am featuring Britney Spears		Backup 1987–2012	Jovanotti	

== See also ==
- 2012 in music
- List of number-one hits in Italy
