= Tutto l'amore che ho =

Single by Jovanotti

from the album Ora
- Released: December 3, 2010
- Genre: Dance-pop
- Length: 3:41
- Label: Universal
- Songwriters: Lorenzo Cherubini; Michele Canova; Riccardo Onori
- Producer: Michele Canova

Jovanotti singles chronology
"Baciami ancora" (2010)	"Tutto l'amore che ho" (2010)	"Le tasche piene di sassi" (2011)

Music video
- "Tutto l'amore che ho" on YouTube

"Tutto l'amore che ho" (transl. "All the love I've got"]) is a song by Italian singer-songwriter Jovanotti. It was released on 3 December 2010 through Universal Music Italy as the lead single from his twelfth studio album Ora.

== Composition ==
The song was written by Jovanotti, Riccardo Onori, and Michele Canova, who is also the music producer of the song. In an interview with La Stampa the singer explained the meaning of the song:

"It was the word "love" that reinforced my desire to sing this song. After hearing this word spoken at a party rally, I felt strongly the need to take it back, to put it back where it belongs, in songs and in real life."

== Music video ==
The music video for the song, directed by Paolo Soravia was released on December 3, 2010, through the singer's YouTube channel. Soravia explained the production behind the music video, which was inspired by works of John Woo, Crank by Neveldine/Taylor, Waltz with Bashir by Ari Folman, John Hillcoat, Danny Boyle and Francis Lawrence:

"The video originated from an idea of Lorenzo's and is the result of much work and research. It is an epic tale in a contemporary key in which Lorenzo struggles against a series of adversities. On his side is the love of life, the love of everything, all the love possible. We thought of a raw, even violent video in strong contrast to the song. We watched dozens of movies analyzing them, looking for references, quotes and images to tell our story. [...] The setting is inspired by movies with the kind of science fiction that leaves cities and architecture intact but turns them into deserted scenarios, ready to host our worst nightmares. [...] It gives an original interpretation to the meaning of the song and offers a brand new version of a Jovanotti as dreamy as ever, but willing to do anything in the name of love. For us, who worked on its making, it remains a powerful experience and a distinct case in Italian videography, especially mainstream videography."

On the social network the video clip has been accompanied by some controversy because of similarities to the video of the song "Solitude is Bliss" by Tame Impala.

== Charts ==
=== Weekly charts ===
Chart (2010–2011)	Peak position
Italy (FIMI)	1
Italy Airplay (EarOne)	1
Switzerland (Schweizer Hitparade)	22

=== Year-end charts ===
Chart (2012)	Peak position
Italy (FIMI)	13

== Certifications ==
Certifications for "Tutto l'amore che ho"
Region	Certification	Certified units/sales
Italy (FIMI)	3× Platinum	90,000^{*}
^{*} Sales figures based on certification alone.
