= Pop Heart =

Studio album by Giorgia
- Released: November 16, 2018
- Genre: Pop
- Length: 58:59
- Language: Italian; English
- Label: Sony; Michroponica
- Producer: Michele Canova

Giorgia chronology
Oronero (2016)	Pop Heart (2018)	Blu¹ (2023)

Singles from Pop Heart
- 1. "Le tasche piene di sassi" Released: 12 October 2018

Pop Heart is the first cover album by Italian singer-songwriter Giorgia, released on 16 November 2018 by the record label Michroponica, and distributed by Sony Music.

== Background and release ==
On October 3, 2018, Giorgia revealed her first cover album recording project on her social media channels: Pop Heart, produced by Michele Canova. The album featured songs from artists or songs which inspired the singer, including American singers as of Whitney Houston, Donna Summer and Madonna, and italian singers as of Pino Daniele, Carmen Consoli, Jovanotti, Mango and Zucchero Fornaciari. The album also features three vocal collaborations: Elisa on "Gli ostacoli del cuore", Eros Ramazzotti on "Una storia importante" and Tiziano Ferro on "Il conforto".

== Critical reception ==
Fabio Fiume of All Music Italia was not impressed by the project, writing that the covered songs "should guarantee a majestic result, but instead of majestic, in the end, it has nothing at all", describing it musically "empty" because "it does not exploit her wonderful vocal talents" and "does not replace their absence with an emotional charge that makes you not miss them". Rockol points out that the singer reinterprets the songs "dressing them in sounds that are sometimes completely different from the original versions" with electronic sounds.

== Track listing ==
Pop Heart track listing
No.	Title	Lyrics	Music	Producer(s)	Length
1.	"Le tasche piene di sassi"	Lorenzo Cherubini	Cherubini; Franco Santarnecchi	Michele Canova	3:45
2.	"Una storia importante" (with Eros Ramazzotti)	Ramazzotti; Adelio Cogliati	Ramazzotti; Piero Cassano	Canova	3:49
3.	"Lei verrà"	Alberto Salerno	Giuseppe Mango	Canova	3:32
4.	"Gli ostacoli del cuore " (with Elisa)	Luciano Ligabue	Ligabue	Canova	3:58
5.	"Dune mosse"	Marco Figliè	Zucchero Fornaciari	Canova	5:38
6.	"Il conforto" (with Tiziano Ferro)	Tiziano Ferro; Emanuele Dabbono	Dabbono	Canova	3:52
7.	"Sweet Dreams (Are Made of This)"	Annie Lennox; David Stewart	Lennox; Stewart	Canova	3:10
8.	"L'ultimo bacio"	Carmen Consoli	Consoli	Canova	3:22
9.	"I Will Always Love You"	Dolly Parton	Parton	Canova	4:02
10.	"I Feel Love"	Donna Adrian Gaines; Giorgio Moroder; Pete Bellotte	Gaines; Moroder; Bellotte	Canova	3:08
11.	"Anima"	Giuseppe Daniele	Daniele	Canova	4:29
12.	"Open Your Heart"	Madonna Louise Ciccone; Gardner Cole; Peter Rafelson	Ciccone; Cole; Rafelson	Canova	3:59
13.	"L'essenziale"	Roberto Casalino; Francesco De Benedettis	Casalino; De Benedettis; Marco Mengoni	Canova	3:36
14.	"Vivere una favola"	Vasco Rossi	Guido Elmi; Massimo Riva	Canova	4:38
15.	"Stay"	John Sudduth; Justin Parker	Sudduth; Parker	Canova	4:01
Total length:					58:59

== Charts ==
=== Weekly charts ===
Weekly chart performance for Pop Heart
Chart (2023)	Peak position
Italian Albums (FIMI)	2
Swiss Albums (Schweizer Hitparade)	44

=== Year-end charts ===
Chart (2018)	Position
Italy (FIMI)	26
Chart (2019)	Position
Italy (FIMI)	79

== Certifications ==
Region	Certification	Certified units/sales
Italy (FIMI)	Platinum	50,000^{‡}
^{‡} Sales+streaming figures based on certification alone.
