= Le tasche piene di sassi =

2011 song by Jovanotti

Single by Jovanotti

from the album Ora
- Released: March 11, 2011
- Genre: Pop rap
- Length: 3:35
- Label: Universal
- Songwriters: Lorenzo Cherubini; Franco Santarnecchi
- Producer: Michele Canova

Jovanotti singles chronology
"Tutto l'amore che ho" (2010)	"Le tasche piene di sassi" (2011)	"Il più grande spettacolo dopo il Big Bang" (2011)

Music video
- "Le tasche piene di sassi" on YouTube

"Le tasche piene di sassi" (transl. "The pockets full of stones"]) is a song by Italian singer-songwriter Jovanotti. It was released on 11 March 2011 through Universal Music Italy as the second single from his twelfth studio album Ora.

== Composition ==
The song was written by Jovanotti and Franco Santarnecchi, under the music production of Michele Canova. The singer explained that the meaning of the song is dedicate to his mother Viola Cardinali.

== Music video ==
The music video for the song, directed by Maki Gherzi was released on March 24, 2011, through the singer's YouTube channel. Jovanotti explained that the video is inspired by Bob Fosse's film Lenny:

"It is a song that offers different possible readings, and making a video with only one visual point of view would have been limiting. It is a purely emotional song and so it was not at all easy to make a video. Then as sometimes happens, suddenly an idea came up that was interesting to us. Going around the net one night I happened to see Lenny, the Bob Fosse film, again. [...] Fosse in his cinema manages to portray the contrast and reciprocity between intimacy and stage. We decided to 'quote' the atmosphere of Lenny, the cinematography, even the shots. [...] I tell a story, not necessarily a comic story, a dramatic story, a biographical story ... a story. The viewer who will see the video will not hear what I am saying and will not even see me singing, but will see a man alone, in the dark, lit only by a bull's eye telling a story to an audience in semi-darkness, telling a story that is life, telling perhaps his life, perhaps telling the lives of those in the audience."

== Charts ==
=== Weekly charts ===
Chart (2011)	Peak position
Italy (FIMI)	2
Italy (Airplay)	2

=== Year-end charts ===
Chart (2011)	Position
Italy (FIMI)	17

== Certifications ==
Certifications for "Le tasche piene di sassi"
Region	Certification	Certified units/sales
Italy (FIMI)	2× Platinum	60,000^{*}
^{*} Sales figures based on certification alone.

== Giorgia version ==
"Le tasche piene di sassi"

Single by Giorgia

from the album Pop Heart
- Released: October 12, 2018
- Genre: Dance pop
- Length: 3:47
- Label: Sony
- Songwriters: Lorenzo Cherubini; Franco Santarnecchi
- Producer: Michele Canova

Giorgia singles chronology
"Come neve" (2017)	"Le tasche piene di sassi" (2018)	"Una storia importante" (2018)

Music video
- "Le tasche piene di sassi" on YouTube

Italian singer Giorgia recorded a cover of "Le tasche piene di sassi", as the lead single from her first cover album Pop Heart, released on October 12, 2018, through Sony Music Italy.

=== Background and release ===
The singer described the cover as "among the most hardest" to perform because she had to "find a way that I didn't actually have to find, but I just had to follow the lyrics, and yet it took me a while to get this thing in focus". In an interview with Radio Italia Solo Musica Italiana, Giorgia explained the decision to cover the song:

"I chose it easily, it is true that it is a personal song, however that lyric so poetic is already a classic of our music, it gets straight to the soul and tells about a moment that sooner or later we all experience. The first time I heard it I cried like a desperate person, it was the first song I chose to do, I wanted to participate in that magic: I connect it very much to my son, reversing Lorenzo's idea in which instead it is the son who addresses his mother."

Jovanotti himself praised the Giorgia version, stating that "The arrangement, by Michele Canova, respects the original version but adds a new rhythm that makes Giorgia's interpretation even more special and unique. For me it is a great honor and a recognition that is worth so much, and I want to thank Giorgia".

=== Charts ===
Chart (2018)	Peak position
Italy (FIMI)	42
Italy (Airplay)	8

=== Certifications ===
Certifications for "Le tasche piene di sassi"
Region	Certification	Certified units/sales
Italy (FIMI)	Gold	25,000^{‡}
^{‡} Sales+streaming figures based on certification alone.
