= Dediche e manie =

Studio album by Biagio Antonacci
- Released: 10 November 2017
- Recorded: 2017
- Genre: Pop rock
- Label: Iris / Sony Music
- Producer: Biagio Antonacci

Biagio Antonacci chronology
L'amore comporta (2014)	Dediche e manie (2017)	Chiaramente visibili dallo spazio (2019)

Singles from Dediche e manie
- 1. "Ci siamo capiti male" Released: 2019; 2. "Ti saprò aspettare" Released: 2020; 3. "Per farti felice" Released: 2020; 4. "L'amore muore" Released: 2020

Dediche e manie is a studio album by Italian singer-songwriter Biagio Antonacci, released on 10 November 2017 on his label Iris and distributed by Sony Music.

== Track listing ==
CD (Iris IRIS2017001, IRIS2017002 / Sony Music)
No.	Title	Length
1.	"Il migliore"	3:44
2.	"Mio fratello" (feat. Mario Incudine)	3:17
3.	"Sei nell'aria" (feat. Laioung)	3:38
4.	"Un bacio lungo come una canzone"	3:08
5.	"In mezzo al mondo"	3:45
6.	"Fortuna che ci sei"	3:42
7.	"Vorrei amarti anch'io"	3:33
8.	"L'addio che mancava"	3:45
9.	"Perché te ne vai"	3:36
10.	"Super"	3:38
11.	"Stanco"	3:44
12.	"L'appello dei popoli"	3:53
13.	"Annina piena di grazia"	3:56

== Charts ==
=== Weekly charts ===
Chart (2017)	Peak position
Italian Albums (FIMI)	2
Swiss Albums (Schweizer Hitparade)	30

=== Monthly charts ===
Chart (2017)	Peak position
Italian Albums (Musica e dischi)	3

=== Year-end charts ===
Chart (2017)	Position
Italian Albums (FIMI)	32
Chart (2018)	Position
Italian Albums (FIMI)	85

== Certifications ==
Region	Certification	Certified units/sales
Italy (FIMI)	Platinum	50,000^{‡}
^{‡} Sales+streaming figures based on certification alone.
