= Mi fai stare bene =

Studio album by Biagio Antonacci
- Released: 25 May 1998
- Genre: Pop rock
- Label: Mercury / PolyGram
- Producer: Biagio Antonacci

Biagio Antonacci chronology
Il mucchio (1996)	Mi fai stare bene (1998)	Tra le mie canzoni (2000)

Singles from Mi fai stare bene
- 1. "Iris (tra le tue poesie)" Released: 1998; 2. "Quanto tempo e ancora" Released: 1998; 3. "Mi fai stare bene" Released: 1998; 4. "Non vendermi" Released: 1999

Mi fai stare bene is a studio album by Italian singer-songwriter Biagio Antonacci, released on 25 May 1998 on Mercury Records.

It has sold 700,000 copies in Italy.

== Track listing ==
CD (Mercury 558 554-2)
No.	Title	Length
1.	"Mi fai stare bene"	03:45
2.	"È mattina"	03:53
3.	"Non vendermi"	04:13
4.	"Quanto tempo e ancora"	03:58
5.	"Cosa fai ragazza"	04:06
6.	"Iris (tra le tue poesie)"	04:00
7.	"Cattiva che sei"	03:49
8.	"Il prato delle anime"	04:25
9.	"Non cambiare tu"	04:22
10.	"Adesso dormi"	04:37
11.	"Il campione"	04:09

== Charts ==
=== Weekly charts ===
Chart (1999)	Peak position
Italian Albums (FIMI)	1
Swiss Albums (Schweizer Hitparade)	44

=== Monthly charts ===
Chart (1998)	Peak position
Italian Albums (Musica e dischi)	2

=== Year-end charts ===
Chart (1999)	Position
Italian Albums (FIMI)	5
