= Chiaramente visibili dallo spazio =

Studio album by Biagio Antonacci
- Released: 29 November 2019
- Genre: Pop rock
- Label: Iris / Sony Music
- Producer: Biagio Antonacci

Biagio Antonacci chronology
Dediche e manie (2017)	Chiaramente visibili dallo spazio (2019)

Singles from Chiaramente visibili dallo spazio
- 1. "Ci siamo capiti male" Released: 2019; 2. "Ti saprò aspettare" Released: 2020; 3. "Per farti felice" Released: 2020; 4. "L'amore muore" Released: 2020

Chiaramente visibili dallo spazio is a studio album by Italian singer-songwriter Biagio Antonacci, released on 29 November 2019 on his label Iris and distributed by Sony Music.

== Track listing ==
CD (Iris IRIS2019001, IRIS2019003 / Sony Music)
No.	Title	Length
1.	"L'amore muore"	3:10
2.	"Ci siamo capiti male"	3:01
3.	"Beata te"	3:27
4.	"Per farti felice"	2:51
5.	"Parigi sei tu"	2:35
6.	"Ti saprò aspettare"	3:27
7.	"Averti"	3:47
8.	"Chiaramente visibili dallo spazio"	3:16
9.	"La vanità"	3:05
10.	"Non è così sbagliato dirsi ciao"	2:59
11.	"Tutto non ti posso raccontare"	3:31
12.	"Una brava persona"	3:23

== Charts ==
=== Weekly charts ===
Chart (2019)	Peak position
Italian Albums (FIMI)	3
Swiss Albums (Schweizer Hitparade)	57

=== Year-end charts ===
Chart (2019)	Position
Italian Albums (FIMI)	83

== Certifications ==
Region	Certification	Certified units/sales
Italy (FIMI)	Gold	25,000^{‡}
^{‡} Sales+streaming figures based on certification alone.
