= Convivendo parte 1 =

Studio album by Biagio Antonacci
- Released: 19 March 2004
- Genre: Pop rock
- Label: Iris / Universal Music Group

Biagio Antonacci chronology
| 9/nov/2001 (2001) | Convivendo parte 1 (2004) | Convivendo parte 2 (2005) |

Singles from Convivendo parte 1
- 1. "Non ci facciamo compagnia" Released: 2004; 2. "Convivendo" Released: 2004; 3. "Mio padre è un re" Released: 2004

Convivendo parte 1 ("Convivendo, Pt. 1") is a studio album by Italian singer-songwriter Biagio Antonacci, released on 19 March 2004 on his label Iris and distributed by Universal Music Group.

== Track listing ==
CD (Iris 981 821-1)
| No. | Title | Length |
|---|---|---|
| 1. | "Convi-intro" | 0:34 |
| 2. | "Convivendo" | 3:51 |
| 3. | "Mio padre è un re" | 4:01 |
| 4. | "Non ci facciamo compagnia" | 4:09 |
| 5. | "Passo da te" | 4:13 |
| 6. | "Dopo il viaggio" | 3:45 |
| 7. | "Mai (non ti prendi mai per come sei)" | 3:42 |
| 8. | "Quell'uomo lì" | 5:19 |
| 9. | "Il fiume dei profumi" | 4:53 |

== Charts ==
=== Weekly charts ===
| Chart (2004) | Peak position |
|---|---|
| Italian Albums (FIMI) | 1 |
| Swiss Albums (Schweizer Hitparade) | 50 |

=== Monthly charts ===
| Chart (2004) | Peak position |
|---|---|
| Italian Albums (Musica e dischi) | 3 |

=== Year-end charts ===
| Chart (2004) | Position |
|---|---|
| Italian Albums (FIMI) | 7 |
| Chart (2005) | Position |
| Italian Albums (FIMI) | 44 |
