= Dendermonde nursery attack =

2009 stabbing at a daycare centre

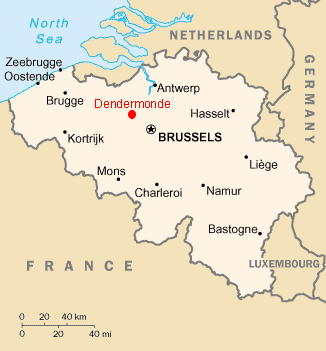
- Dendermonde shown within Belgium
- Location: 51°1′10″N 4°6′40″E; Sint-Gillis-bij-Dendermonde, Dendermonde, Belgium
- Date: 23 January 2009; 17 years ago 10:19 - 10:24 a.m. UTC-1 (CET)
- Attack type: Mass stabbing
- Weapons: Three kitchen knives; Hatchet (unused)
- Deaths: 4 (3 in the nursery & a 73 year old woman in her home)
- Injuries: 13 (including the attacker)
- Perpetrator: Kim de Gelder
- Motive: Inconclusive, possibly misanthropy
- Convictions: Murder (4 counts); Attempted murder (25 counts)

On 23 January 2009, a stabbing attack took place at Het Fabeltjesland daycare centre in Sint-Gillis-bij-Dendermonde, East Flanders, Belgium. Three people were killed, and twelve were injured in the attack. The perpetrator, 20-year-old Kim de Gelder, had killed an elderly woman in Beveren a week earlier and police have suggested he was plotting more nursery attacks.

In 2013, de Gelder was sentenced to life imprisonment. The daycare centre where the initial attack occurred is expected never to reopen.

== Related attacks ==
=== Preparation ===
In October 2008, 20-year-old Kim de Gelder, a resident of Sinaai, started purchasing items for his plan to murder people. His original plan was to pretend to be a house water and soil inspector to get into peoples' houses before murdering them. Over the course of four months, he purchased knives, a bulletproof vest, makeup, a camera, a printer for business cards, a laminator, a bicycle, glasses, pH test strips, and blue T-shirts with the logo of his fake inspection company. He activated a new phone number, made a fake voicemail related to his company, resigned from his old job, and created his own business card. He also created the fake name "Beekmans Marcus" for the business card, and added a photo of himself with glasses, red hair, and a fake mole.

=== Attempted murder of a family ===
On 12 January 2009, De Gelder visited a neighborhood in Vrasene, a village located in Beveren, to scout the area. The neighborhood was located on Galgstraat (now called Permanstraat). Two days later, he arrived at the neighborhood on his bike while wearing his water inspector disguise. He also wore a bulletproof vest underneath his shirt. He hid a knife in a jacket and walked up to a house with the intention of killing everyone inside. He walked around the house, looking for a front door. He tried to open a back door and looked through windows, only to realize the family wasn't in the house. He put back on a scarf, placed his items in his backpack, and left the neighborhood in frustration. During this time, he lost his knife, which had fallen through a hole that had formed earlier in the jacket. De Gelder sewed the hole three days later.

=== Murder of Elza Van Raemdonck ===
On 16 January, at approx. 1 p.m., De Gelder wore his water inspector disguise and his bulletproof vest. He returned to Vrasene on his bicycle with the intention of killing everyone in Galgstraat, as well as the people living in Zillebeekstraat. He parked his bicycle in a hidden spot before approaching the door to a house. He pulled out his knife and hid it in his jacket, before ringing the doorbell. He was also carrying several items related to water inspection. Elza Van Raemdonck answered the door, and De Gelder introduced himself as a water inspector. He asked Van Raemdonck if he could check her water meter to take samples. Van Raemdonck allowed him in and let him enter her bedroom, as the water meter was located there. Once in the bedroom, De Gelder pulled out his knife and stabbed Van Raemdonck in the chest, neck, and stomach. She collapsed between the wall and bed.

After killing Van Raemdonck, De Gelder wiped the blood on his knife on her sweater. He checked the house to see if anyone else was home, only to realize no one else was there. He returned to Van Raemdonck's body and poked her cheek to see if she was dead. After verifying, De Gelder checked his clothes for blood before putting his items in a backpack. He got on his bicycle and rode back home. At approx. 4:55 p.m., Van Raemdonck's husband returned home and called the police after discovering his wife's body.

During his ride back home, De Gelder briefly stopped midway to cover up his makeup. He returned to his apartment at 3 p.m. De Gelder changed his hair color from red to brown, and spent several hours in the bathroom processing the murder in his head. Later in the evening, De Gelder attended a stand-up comedy show before going back home at 11 p.m. He struggled to sleep for the entire night.

The next day, De Gelder looked up the murder on the internet. After being relieved that he wasn't a suspect, he made a "scoreboard" document to track his victims. He would spend the next few days planning an attack on three daycare centers in Dendermonde after looking up contract killers, serial killers, and mass murderers.

=== Dendermonde nursery stabbing ===
On 23 January, De Gelder woke up at approx. 5 a.m. He dyed his hair red and put on his fake mole before setting off wearing a grey raincoat, blue jeans, his jacket, a blue t-shirt, a backpack, glasses, and a bulletproof vest. In his backpack, he carried three kitchen knives, a hatchet, a fake revolver, spare clothing, makeup, black pliers, a glasses case, and a map. Before deciding on the daycare he would attack, De Gelder approached a daycare with workers outside. He abandoned the idea of attacking that building. He then rode to Het Fabeltjesland daycare on Vijfde Januaristraat.

At 10:15 a.m., he was seen outside the daycare on his bicycle. He proceeded to enter the building through an automatic sliding door. The reception desk was empty by the time he entered. De Gelder looked into two storage closets to look for staff. After finding no one, De Gelder considered giving up and walked to the sliding doors. The doors didn't open for him, so he moved to a different hallway. As he entered the hallway, he heard the sound of people talking around the corner. De Gelder rounded the corner and encountered a childcare worker, Rita Van Geyte. He walked up to her with his knife concealed behind his back. He said to her, "I have a question, can you help me?" before he started attacking her with the knife. The woman struggled with De Gelder and both of them ended up in the daycare's kitchen. De Gelder threw the woman against the kitchen's island and stabbed her in the neck. After stabbing the woman, De Gelder turned around and noticed Marita Blindeman sitting on a chair, trying to call the police using a phone on the kitchen wall. De Gelder killed her with stabs to her neck and abdomen. Van Geyte and another woman both ran out of the kitchen. De Gelder ran out of the kitchen too and stabbed Van Geyte again. Van Geyte ran to a storage closet in the playroom, with two workers hiding inside. De Gelder went to the daycare's playroom and tried opening the storage closet. The workers held the door closed. When De Gelder let go of the knob, one of the workers in the closet came out with a Swiffer duster and tried attacking him with it. De Gelder knocked the woman down before stabbing her in the head area repeatedly.

He then began attacking the small children in the playroom. De Gelder heard the scream of Corneel Vermeir who was playing on the floor. He walked over to the toddler and picked him up. He proceeded to fatally stab the boy in the neck before placing him down. De Gelder moved further into the playroom and encountered a baby lying in a crib in the corner of the room. He proceeded to stab the child's throat, leaving her severely injured. De Gelder moved towards the play castle and targeted three more toddlers playing on the floor. One of them was Leon Garcia-Mannaert. He slashed and stabbed the throats of all three of them, killing Garcia-Mannaert and leaving the other two children with injuries. At some point, the tip of his kitchen knife broke off as he was stabbing the three children.

Immediately after, Van Geyte picked up one of the toddlers and ran to the dormitory. De Gelder tried opening the door. Van Geyte held him back by blocking the door and latching it. De Gelder eventually gave up and returned to the playroom. As he returned, he was noticed by two workers who were with 10 children on the outside back terrace. They began running towards the parking lot. De Gelder quickly moved outside to the terrace and approached them. As he approached the children he said "shh" before beginning to attack them. He wounded six of the children on the terrace and backyard, kicking one of the children down. At one point, he also jumped over a small garden fence to pursue children that ran from him. The remaining four children were unharmed due to the heroic actions of the two workers. After attacking the children outside, De Gelder quickly climbed over the daycare center's fence and dropped two of his knives in the process. He got on his bicycle and left the scene.

Initial reports claimed he was wearing black-and-white makeup with his hair vividly colored red, similar to that of Joker from the Batman films (who, however, has green hair and white and red facial features). De Gelder's attorney, Jaak Haentjens, later formally denied any link to "the Joker", attributing the claims of face paint to De Gelder's pale skin. De Gelder was, in the eyes of his friends and colleagues, a silent boy, who never said anything.

A total of eighteen infants or toddlers under the age of three and six adults were in the nursery at the time of the attack. Two infants and one adult were killed; six children, all between one and three years old, were seriously injured; another four suffered minor injuries; and nine escaped unscathed.

== Victims ==
- Leon Garcia-Mannaert, an eight-month-old boy,
- Corneel Vermeir, a nine-month-old boy,
- Marita Blindeman, a 54-year-old.

Initial reports on Belgian television suggested that five people had been killed and twenty others had been injured, with government officials only confirming the death of one adult and one child. This number was later increased, as another infant had died from the injuries he had sustained. It has also been reported that some of the surviving children have needed plastic surgery due to serious mutilations.

== Investigation ==
A massive search operation was mounted, and a man was captured by police an hour later at 11:25 a.m., in the nearby town of Lebbeke. Having been wounded during his capture, the man was taken to a hospital in Aalst, Belgium. Police reported that he was carrying a list of nurseries and riding in direction of another day care in Dendermonde, which they suspect he may have been planning to attack as well.

At a press conference on the evening of the attack, public prosecutor Christian Du Four provided the following information about the alleged offender, denying several early rumours:

He is a 20-year-old Belgian and was not under the influence of drugs or alcoholic beverages. He acts strangely and mocks his interrogators. He is not a patient of a psychiatric institution. He has so far given five different identities.

== Perpetrator ==
De Gelder was identified as the attacker on 25 January 2009. De Gelder confided in his attorney, stating that he had been troubled by depression as a teenager and at one point heard voices in his head. A former gifted child who became increasingly isolated as time went on, he reportedly suffered from bullying from a young age and attempted suicide in November 2006. Regardless, a psychiatrist had concluded that he did not need to be sent to a mental institution.

On 26 January 2009, Belgian officials named De Gelder as the primary suspect in the murder of Elza Van Raemdonck on 16 January. Prosecutor Christian Du Four told journalists that there were "very clear indications of links between the murders", though De Gelder denied any involvement. Police stated that he was planning attacks on other nurseries.

On 27 January, De Gelder admitted to the attacks. The media originally reported that De Gelder was wearing makeup at the time of the attack, making him look like the Joker, but police have not confirmed that depiction. In further media reports, De Gelder reportedly watched The Dark Knight an unusually high number of times ("film obsession"), appears to have quoted the character Harvey Dent at the start of the attack. Both police investigators and De Gelder's lawyer have made statements dismissing such as relevant to his motive in the attack.

De Gelder's attorneys argued that he had schizophrenia and therefore could not be held fully accountable for his actions. Psychiatrists believed that De Gelder was faking psychosis and instead diagnosed him with schizotypal personality disorder with psychopathic traits and narcissistic features. After admitting to police to having lied about hearing voices to kill people, he claimed that he held a strong, generalized hatred against humanity as a whole. The College of Psychiatrists concluded De Gelder was sane and competent to stand trial, and was in control of his actions when he committed the murders.

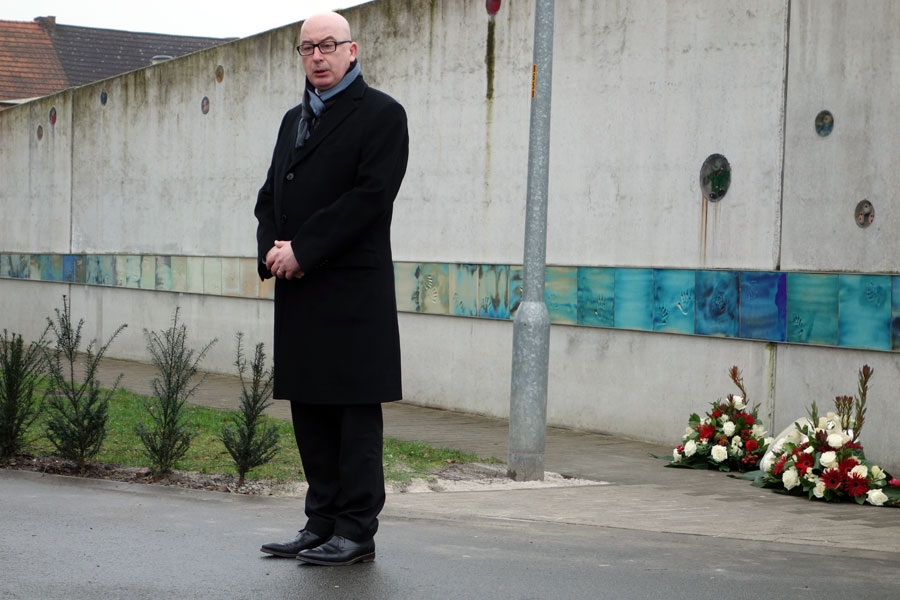
Piet Buyse at the 5 year memorial of the Dendermonde nursery attack

On 22 March 2013, a jury declared De Gelder was fully accountable for the attack and found him guilty of four counts of murder. He was sentenced to life imprisonment the following day. De Gelder chose not to appeal. Under Belgian law, prisoners serving a life sentence with no prior convictions must spend a minimum of 15 years in prison before being up for parole, putting his earliest possible release date in 2024. However, in 2019, psychiatrists deemed that he was still mentally unstable and a danger to society, and he was transferred to a secure forensic psychiatric system, where he will remain indefinitely.

== Memorials ==
The mayor of Dendermonde, Piet Buyse, said, "The victims are being cared for and those who were not injured have been brought to a centre where they are receiving counseling."

Italian singer Luciano Ligabue dedicated a song to the victims, "Quando mi vieni a prendere? (Dendermonde 23/01/09)" featured on his 2010 album, Arrivederci, mostro!.

Some 6,000 people marched through Dendermonde on 25 January 2009, laying hundreds of bouquets and stuffed animals outside the daycare centre as the Mayor of Dendermonde, Piet Buyse, announced that the Fabeltjesland nursery would never reopen.

== See also ==
- List of massacres in Belgium
