= Vicky Love (album) =

Studio album by Biagio Antonacci
- Released: 16 March 2007
- Genre: Pop rock
- Label: Iris / Universal Music Group

Biagio Antonacci chronology
Convivendo parte 2 (2005)	Vicky Love (2007)	Inaspettata (2010)

Singles from Vicky Love
- 1. "Lascia stare" Released: 2007; 2. "Sognami" Released: 2007; 3. "L'impossibile" Released: 2007

Vicky Love is a studio album by Italian singer-songwriter Biagio Antonacci, released on 16 March 2007 on his label Iris and distributed by Universal Music Group.

== Track listing ==
CD (Iris 1727255 / UMG)
No.	Title	Length
1.	"È soffocamento"	4:11
2.	"Lascia stare"	4:20
3.	"C'è silenzio"	4:12
4.	"Sognami"	4:40
5.	"L'impossibile"	4:01
6.	"Coccinella"	5:57
7.	"Vicky Love"	3:51
8.	"Non sei più quì"	4:10
9.	"Giù le mani capo"	3:42
10.	"Non eri tu "quel brivido di libertà""	3:49
11.	"A volte"	9:47
12.	"Fotografia"

Note: "Fotografia" is a hidden track.

== Charts ==
=== Weekly charts ===
Chart (2007)	Peak position
Italian Albums (FIMI)	1
Swiss Albums (Schweizer Hitparade)	49

=== Monthly charts ===
Chart (2007)	Peak position
Italian Albums (Musica e dischi)	1

=== Year-end charts ===
Chart (2007)	Position
Italian Albums (FIMI)	4
Chart (2008)	Position
Italian Albums (FIMI)	52
