= 9/nov/2001 =

Studio album by Biagio Antonacci
- Released: 9 November 2001
- Genre: Pop rock
- Label: Iris / Universal Music Italia
- Producer: Biagio Antonacci

Biagio Antonacci chronology
Tra le mie canzoni (2000)	9/nov/2001 (2001)	Convivendo parte 1 (2004)

Singles from 9/nov/2001
- 1. "Ti ricordi perché" Released: 2001; 2. "Ritorno ad amare" Released: 2001; 3. "Angela" Released: 2001; 4. "Che differenza c'è" Released: 2002; 5. "Solo due parole" Released: 2002

Professional ratings
Review scores
Source	Rating
AllMusic	3/5 stars

9/nov/2001 is a studio album by Italian singer-songwriter Biagio Antonacci, released on 9 November 2001 by Universal Music Italia. It has sold more than 500,000 copies in Italy.

== Track listing ==
CD (Iris 586 626-2)
No.	Title	Length
1.	"Angela"	3:43
2.	"Ritorno ad amare"	3:59
3.	"Solo due parole"	4:29
4.	"Che differenza c'è"	3:51
5.	"Come se fossi un'isola"	4:03
6.	"Non tentarmi"	4:01
7.	"Sarebbe bello"	3:56
8.	"Ti ricordi perché"	4:05
9.	"Se tornerai"	3:39
10.	"Volevo solo dirti che"	4:16
11.	"Io ho te"	4:18

== Charts ==
=== Weekly charts ===
Chart (2001)	Peak position
Italian Albums (FIMI)	2
Swiss Albums (Schweizer Hitparade)	48

=== Monthly charts ===
Chart (2001)	Peak position
Italian Albums (Musica e dischi)	4

=== Year-end charts ===
Chart (2001)	Position
Italian Albums (FIMI)	25
