= Made in Italy (disambiguation) =

Made in Italy is a merchandise mark indicating that a product is all planned, manufactured and packed in Italy.

Made in Italy may also refer to:

- Made in Italy (1965 film), an Italian anthology comedy film
- Made in Italy (2020 film), an American comedy drama film
- Made in Italy (album), by Luciano Ligabue (2016)
- "Made in Italy" (song), by Rosa Chemical (2023)
