= Loredana Errore =

Romanian-born Italian singer-songwriter

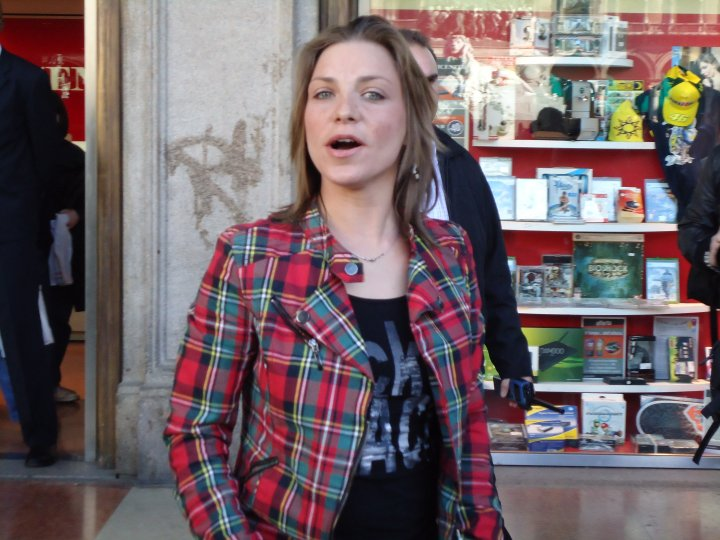
- Errore during a promotional event at the Mondadori store in Milan, 2010

Background information
- Born: Loredana Errore; 27 October 1984 (age 41); Bucharest, Romania
- Genre: Pop rock
- Occupations: Singer; songwriter
- Instruments: Vocals, guitar
- Years active: 2009–present
- Labels: DC Records Italy (2009–2010); Sony Music (2010–2014); Isola degli Artisti (2016-2018); Azzurra Music (2020-2023)
- Website: www.azzurramusic.it/it/component/virtuemart/manufacturer/loredana-errore

Loredana Errore (born 27 October 1984) is a Romanian-born Italian singer-songwriter. After participating in various singing competitions, she officially debuted in 2009 at the ninth edition of the Italian talent show Amici di Maria De Filippi, eventually reaching the finals and finishing in second place.

She signed a contract with record label Sony Music Entertainment, which allowed her to publish an EP called Ragazza Occhi Cielo in 2010. Over 60,000 copies were sold and it was certified platinum after three weeks. Errore lives with her adoptive family in Agrigento, the city from where she graduated.

== Early career ==
Born in Bucharest, Errore started performing in school plays during the 1990s. She also participated in various singing competitions often placing at the top. In 2001, she was admitted to the final rounds of the Festival of Naples, winning a scholarship. In 2002, Errore took part in the selection of the National Academy of Sanremo Song, finishing in the top sixteen. In 2004, she won second place in the singing contest "Sing Me". In 2005, she composed and sang the song House of Joy for a Bialetti advertisement. Also that year, Errore was selected for the finals of the competition "Young Mia Martini". She traveled to Lampedusa, Bologna and London to practice and work with artists such as Mario Biondi, Roy Paci, Antonio Michel and Mughal. She has also performed at public venues and street parties.

== Later career ==
On 26 September 2009 Errore competed on the talent show Amici di Maria De Filippi; before participating in the program she published the single Lame with the music label DC Records Italy.

In 2010 she publishes her first EP, Ragazza Occhi Cielo, whose extracted singles are Ragazza Occhi Cielo, L'ho visto prima io and Oggi tocchi a me. The EP reached the third position of the Italian Almums Chart and it was certified Platinum.

On 8 March 2011 her first studio album L'errore was released, it reached number eleven on the Italian Albums Chart.

On 28 August 2012 her second studio album Pioggia di comete was released, it reached number four on the Italian Albums Chart.

== Personal life ==
In 2013 Loredana Errore was involved in a serious car accident that caused her a temporary paralysis. She considers herself Roman Catholic.

== Discography ==
=== Albums/EP ===
| Year | Title | Charts | | Certification |
| Year | Title | IT | EU | Certification |
|---|---|---|---|---|
| 2010 | Ragazza occhi cielo (EP) | 3 | 45 | Platinum (60.000+) |
| 2011 | L'errore | 11 | — | — |
| 2012 | Pioggia di comete | 4 | — | — |
| 2016 | Luce infinita | 5 | — | — |

=== Singles ===
- Lame (2009)
- Ragazza occhi cielo (2010)
- L'ho visto prima io (2010)
- Oggi tocchi a me (2010)
- Il muro (2011)
- Cattiva (2011)
- Che bel sogno che ho fatto (2011)
- Una pioggia di comete (2012)

== Awards and nominations ==
| Year | Award | Category | Work | Result |
|---|---|---|---|---|
| 2010 | Wind Music Award | Gold Album | Ragazza occhi cielo (album) | Won |
| 2010 | Platinum certification | – | Ragazza occhi cielo (album) | Won |
| 2010 | Venice Music Award | The Voice | herself | Won |
| 2010 | Gold certification | – | Ragazza occhi cielo (single) | Won |
| 2011 | TRL Awards | Best talent show artist | herself | Nominated |
| 2011 | Venere d'Argento International Award | – | herself | Won |
