= Convivendo parte 2 =

Studio album by Biagio Antonacci
- Released: 11 February 2005
- Genre: Pop rock
- Label: Iris / Universal Music Group

Biagio Antonacci chronology
Convivendo parte 1 (2004)	Convivendo parte 2 (2005)	Vicky Love (2005)

Singles from Convivendo parte 2
- 1. "Sappi amore mio" Released: 2005; 2. "Pazzo di lei" Released: 2005

Convivendo parte 2 ("Convivendo, Pt. 2") is a studio album by Italian singer-songwriter Biagio Antonacci, released on 11 February 2005 on his label Iris and distributed by Universal Music Group.

== Track listing ==
CD (Iris 982 774-8)
No.	Title	Length
1.	"Convi-intro"	0:40
2.	"Immagina"	3:30
3.	"Sappi amore mio"	3:46
4.	"Pazzo di lei"	4:15
5.	"Oggi tocchi a me"	3:59
6.	"Amo te"	3:54
7.	"Non ti passa più"	3:38
8.	"Un cuore"	3:34
9.	"Eternità"	6:29

== Charts ==
=== Weekly charts ===
Chart (2005)	Peak position
Italian Albums (FIMI)	1
Swiss Albums (Schweizer Hitparade)	38

=== Monthly charts ===
Chart (2005)	Peak position
Italian Albums (Musica e dischi)	1

=== Year-end charts ===
Chart (2005)	Position
Italian Albums (FIMI)	1
