= Vivere o niente =

Studio album by Vasco Rossi
- Released: 29 March 2011
- Genre: Rock; pop rock
- Length: 55:47
- Label: EMI
- Producer: Guido Elmi; Vasco Rossi

Vasco Rossi chronology
Il mondo che vorrei (2008)	Vivere o niente (2011)	Sono innocente (2014)

Singles from Vivere o niente
- 1. "Eh… già" Released: 7 February 2011; 2. "Manifesto futurista della nuova umanità" Released: 6 May 2011; 3. "Stammi vicino" Released: 4 November 2011; 4. "Vivere o niente" Released: 27 November 2012

Vivere o niente is the sixteenth studio album by Italian singer-songwriter Vasco Rossi, released by EMI Records on 29 March 2011. The album was preceded by the single "Eh… già", on 7 February 2011. It was the best-selling album of 2011 in Italy.

== Track listing ==
No.	Title	Writer(s)	Length
1.	"Vivere non è facile"	Vasco Rossi; Tullio Ferro; Guido Elmi	4:54
2.	"Manifesto futurista della nuova umanità"	Rossi; Saverio Principini; Simone Sello	3:54
3.	"Starò meglio di così"	Rossi; Ferro	4:52
4.	"Prendi la strada"	Rossi	3:30
5.	"Dici che"	Rossi; Gaetano Curreri; Saverio Grandi	5:00
6.	"Eh... già"	Roberto Casini; Andrea Righi; Rossi	3:45
7.	"Sei pazza di me"	Rossi; Gianni Novi; Ferro; Elmi	4:13
8.	"Vivere o niente"	Rossi; Ferro; Elmi	4:01
9.	"L'aquilone"	Rossi	4:25
10.	"Non sei quella che eri"	Rossi; Ferro	3:47
11.	"Stammi vicino"	Rossi; Stef Burns; Peppino D'Agostino	5:21
12.	"Maledetta ragione" (includes the ghost track "Mary Luise")	Rossi	8:05

== Charts ==
Chart (2011)	Peak position
Belgian Albums (Ultratop Wallonia)	66
Italian Albums (FIMI)	1
Swiss Albums (Schweizer Hitparade)	6

== Certifications ==
Region	Certification	Certified units/sales
Italy (FIMI)	Diamond	300,000^{*}
Switzerland (IFPI Switzerland)	Gold	15,000^{^}
^{*} Sales figures based on certification alone.^{^} Shipments figures based on certification alone.
