= Ora (Jovanotti album) =

Studio album by Jovanotti
- Released: 25 January 2011
- Recorded: March 2010 – December 2010
- Length: 90:20
- Label: Universal, Soleluna
- Producer: Michele Canova, Jovanotti

Jovanotti chronology
| OYEAH (2009) | Ora (2011) | Backup 1987-2012 - Il Best (2012) |

Singles from Ora
- 1. "Tutto l'amore che ho" Released: 3 December 2010; 2. "Le tasche piene di sassi" Released: 11 March 2011; 3. "Il più grande spettacolo dopo il Big Bang" Released: 22 May 2011; 4. "La notte dei desideri" Released: 9 September 2011; 5. "Ora" Released: 29 November 2011

Professional ratings
Review scores
| Source | Rating |
|---|---|
| Freequency | 3/5 stars |
| Rockol.it | 4.5/5 stars |
| Rolling Stone Italy | 4/5 stars |
| Il Tempo | 3/5 stars |

Ora is the twelfth studio album by Italian singer-songwriter Jovanotti, released by Universal Music on 25 January 2011.

The album debuted atop the Italian Albums Chart and peaked at number one for three consecutive weeks. The album was preceded by the single "Tutto l'amore che ho", released on 2 December 2010, which peaked at number one on the FIMI Singles Chart. It also spawned the top-10 singles "Le tasche piene di sassi", "Il più grande spettacolo dopo il Big Bang", "La notte dei desideri" and "Ora".

== Track listing ==
CD 1
| No. | Title | Writer(s) | Length |
|---|---|---|---|
| 1. | "Megamix" | Jovanotti, Saturnino Celani, Riccardo Onori, Michele Canova | 3:28 |
| 2. | "Tutto l'amore che ho" | Jovanotti, Onori, Canova | 3:38 |
| 3. | "Le tasche piene di sassi" | Jovanotti, Franco Santarnecchi | 3:33 |
| 4. | "Amami" | Jovanotti, Canova | 3:26 |
| 5. | "Ora" | Jovanotti, Onori, Canova | 4:01 |
| 6. | "Il più grande spettacolo dopo il Big Bang" | Jovanotti, Celani | 3:50 |
| 7. | "L'elemento umano" | Jovanotti, Onori | 5:15 |
| 8. | "La bella vita (La belle vie)" (feat. Amadou & Mariam) | Jovanotti, Amadou Bagayoko, Mariam Doumbia | 5:07 |
| 9. | "Battiti di ali di farfalla" (feat. Michael Franti) | Jovanotti, Michael Franti | 4:01 |
| 10. | "Io danzo" | Jovanotti | 4:31 |
| 11. | "La notte dei desideri" | Jovanotti, Canova | 3:27 |
| 12. | "Quando sarò vecchio" | Jovanotti, Celani, Onori, Canova, Santarnecchi | 4:47 |
| 13. | "Un'illusione" | Jovanotti, Santarnecchi | 3:12 |
| 14. | "La porta è aperta" | Jovanotti, Canova | 3:43 |
| 15. | "Rosso d'emozione" | Jovanotti, Canova | 4:34 |

CD 2 (Deluxe Edition only)
| No. | Title | Writer(s) | Length |
|---|---|---|---|
| 1. | "Spingo il tempo al massimo" | Jovanotti, Canova | 3:39 |
| 2. | "I pesci grossi" (feat. Cesare Cremonini) | Jovanotti, Cesare Cremonini | 4:44 |
| 3. | "Kebrillah" | Jovanotti, Canova | 3:43 |
| 4. | "La festa infinita" | Jovanotti, Celani, Onori, Christian Rigano | 4:12 |
| 5. | "Sulla frontiera" | Jovanotti, Celani, Onori | 3:37 |
| 6. | "Dabadabadance" | Jovanotti, Canova | 3:35 |
| 7. | "La medicina" | Jovanotti, Canova | 3:48 |
| 8. | "Sul lungomare del mondo" | Jovanotti, Onori | 2:47 |
| 9. | "Go!!!!!!!" | Jovanotti, Canova | 3:22 |
| 10. | "L'elemento umano" (Acoustic Version) | Jovanotti, Onori | 3:58 |

== Charts and certifications ==
=== Charts ===
| Chart (2011) | Peak position |
|---|---|
| Austrian Albums Chart | 69 |
| Italian Albums Chart | 1 |
| Swiss Albums Charts | 2 |

=== Year-end charts ===
| Chart (2011) | Position |
|---|---|
| Italian Albums Chart | 3 |
| Swiss Albums Chart | 46 |
| Chart (2012) | Position |
| Italian Albums Chart | 23 |

=== Certifications ===
| Region | Certification | Certified units/sales |
|---|---|---|
| Italy (FIMI) | Diamond | 300,000^{*} |
| Switzerland (IFPI Switzerland) | Gold | 10,000^{^} |
^{*} Sales figures based on certification alone.^{^} Shipments figures based on certification alone.
