= Mondovisione =

Studio album by Ligabue
- Released: 26 November 2013
- Recorded: July–October 2013; Zoo Studio, Correggio
- Genre: Rock; Alternative rock
- Label: Zoo Aperto
- Producer: Luciano Luisi

Ligabue chronology
Arrivederci, mostro! (2010)	Mondovisione (2013)	Giro Del Mondo (2015)

Singles from Mondovisione
- 1. "Il sale della terra" Released: 5 September 2013; 2. "Tu sei lei" Released: 25 November 2013; 3. "Per Sempre" Released: 15 February 2014; 4. "Il muro del suono" Released: 9 May 2014; 5. "Siamo chi siamo" Released: 29 August 2014; 6. "Sono sempre i sogni a dare forma al mondo" Released: 28 November 2014

Mondovisione is the eleventh studio album by Italian singer-songwriter Luciano Ligabue. Despite being released on 26 November 2013, the record became the best-selling album of the year in Italy, and it was later certified septuple platinum by the Federation of the Italian Music Industry.

== Track listing ==
Standard Edition
No.	Title	Writer(s)	Length
1.	"Il muro del suono"	Luciano Ligabue	4:29
2.	"Siamo chi siamo"	Ligabue	4:15
3.	"Il volume delle tue bugie"	Ligabue	4:09
4.	"La neve se ne frega"	Ligabue	3:31
5.	"Il sale della terra"	Ligabue	3:56
6.	"Capo Spartivento"	Ligabue	0:48
7.	"Tu sei lei"	Ligabue	4:22
8.	"Nati per vivere (adesso e qui)"	Ligabue	3:50
9.	"La terra trema, amore mio"	Ligabue	4:01
10.	"Per sempre"	Ligabue	3:55
11.	"Ciò che rimane di noi"	Ligabue	4:42
12.	"Il suono, il brutto e il cattivo"	Ligabue	0:41
13.	"Con la scusa del rock 'n' roll"	Ligabue	3:26
14.	"Sono sempre i sogni a dare forma al mondo"	Ligabue	4:33

== Charts ==
=== Peak positions ===
Chart (2013)	Peak position
Italian Albums (FIMI)	1
Swiss Albums (Schweizer Hitparade)	21

=== Year-end charts ===
Chart (2013)	Position
Italian Albums (FIMI)	1
Chart (2014)	Position
Italian Albums (FIMI)	10

== Certifications ==
Region	Certification	Certified units/sales
Italy (FIMI)	7× Platinum	350,000^{*}
^{*} Sales figures based on certification alone.

== See also ==
- List of best-selling albums by year (Italy)
