= Inaspettata =

Studio album by Biagio Antonacci
- Released: 13 April 2010
- Genre: Pop rock
- Label: Iris / Sony Music

Biagio Antonacci chronology
Vicky Love (2007)	Inaspettata (2010)	Sapessi dire no (2012)

Singles from Inaspettata
- 1. "Se fosse per sempre" Released: 2010; 2. "Inaspettata (Unexpected)" Released: 2010; 3. "Chiedimi scusa" Released: 2010; 4. "Buongiorno bell'anima" Released: 2010; 5. "Ubbidirò" Released: 2011

Professional ratings
Review scores
Source	Rating
AllMusic	not rated

Inaspettata is a studio album by Italian singer-songwriter Biagio Antonacci, released on 13 April 2010 on his label Iris and distributed by Sony Music.

== Track listing ==
CD (Iris IRIS2010001, IRIS2010002 / Sony Music)
No.	Title	Length
1.	"Vivi l'avventura"	4:09
2.	"Se fosse per sempre"	3:37
3.	"Buongiorno bell'anima"	4:14
4.	"Inaspettata (Unexpected)" (feat. Leona Lewis)	4:05
5.	"Chiedimi scusa"	3:45
6.	"Lei, lui e lei"	4:38
7.	"Ubbidirò" (feat. Club Dogo)	4:11
8.	"Resterà di te"	4:08
9.	"Questa donna"	3:57
10.	"La rarità"	3:38
11.	"Migrazione"	4:59

== Charts ==
=== Weekly charts ===
Chart (2010)	Peak position
Greek Albums (IFPI)	9
Italian Albums (FIMI)	1
Swiss Albums (Schweizer Hitparade)	33

=== Monthly charts ===
Chart (2010)	Peak position
Italian Albums (Musica e dischi)	1

=== Year-end charts ===
Chart (2010)	Position
Italian Albums (FIMI)	3
Chart (2011)	Position
Italian Albums (FIMI)	33

== Certifications and sales ==
Region	Certification	Certified units/sales
Italy (FIMI)	3× Platinum	180,000^{*}
^{*} Sales figures based on certification alone.
