= Sapessi dire no =

Studio album by Biagio Antonacci
- Released: 17 April 2012
- Genre: Pop rock
- Label: Iris / Sony Music Entertainment

Biagio Antonacci chronology
Inaspettata (2010)	Sapessi dire no (2012)	L'amore comporta (2014)

Singles from Sapessi dire no
- 1. "Ti dedico tutto" Released: 2012; 2. "Non vivo più senza te" Released: 2012; 3. "Insieme finire" Released: 2012; 4. "L'evento" Released: 2012; 5. "Dimenticarti è poco" Released: 2013

Sapessi dire no is a studio album by Italian singer-songwriter Biagio Antonacci, released on 17 April 2012 on his label Iris and distributed by Sony Music Entertainment.

== Track listing ==
CD (IRIS2012001, IRIS2012002 / Sony Music)
No.	Title	Length
1.	"Insieme finire"	3:59
2.	"Ti dedico tutto"	3:21
3.	"L'evento"	4:12
4.	"Con infinito onore"	3:01
5.	"Quì"	4:09
6.	"Senza un nome"	3:30
7.	"Dimenticarti è poco"	3:09
8.	"Solo mai"	3:31
9.	"Sono stato innamorato"	3:51
10.	"Dormi nel cuore"	3:49
11.	"Non vivo più senza te"	3:33
12.	"Naturale"	3:16
13.	"Liberandoti di me"	3:56
14.	"Ciao tristezza"	3:21

== Charts ==
=== Weekly charts ===
Chart (2012)	Peak position
Italian Albums (FIMI)	1
Swiss Albums (Schweizer Hitparade)	55

=== Monthly charts ===
Chart (2012)	Peak position
Italian Albums (Musica e dischi)	1

Sapessi dire no (special edition)

Chart (2012)	Peak position
Italian Albums (Musica e dischi)	22

=== Year-end charts ===
Chart (2012)	Position
Italian Albums (FIMI)	4
Chart (2013)	Position
Italian Albums (FIMI)	77

== Certifications and sales ==
Region	Certification	Certified units/sales
Italy (FIMI)	2× Platinum	120,000^{*}
^{*} Sales figures based on certification alone.
