= L'amore comporta =

Studio album by Biagio Antonacci
- Released: 8 April 2014
- Genre: Pop rock
- Label: Iris / Sony Music

Biagio Antonacci chronology
| Sapessi dire no (2012) | L'amore comporta (2014) | Dediche e manie (2017) |

Singles from L'amore comporta
- 1. "Ti penso raramente" Released: 2014; 2. "Dolore e forza" Released: 2014; 3. "Tu sei bella" Released: 2014; 4. "Ho la musica nel cuore" Released: 2014; 5. "L'amore comporta" Released: 2015

L'amore comporta is a studio album by Italian singer-songwriter Biagio Antonacci, released on 8 April 2014 on his label Iris and distributed by Sony Music.

== Track listing ==
CD (Iris IRIS2014001, IRIS2014002 / Sony Music)
| No. | Title | Length |
|---|---|---|
| 1. | "Cado" | 3:26 |
| 2. | "Ti penso raramente" | 4:01 |
| 3. | "L'amore comporta" | 3:27 |
| 4. | "Hai bisogno di me" | 3:22 |
| 5. | "Tu sei bella" | 4:02 |
| 6. | "Mai mi dici amore" | 2:55 |
| 7. | "Dolore e forza" | 3:48 |
| 8. | "Ho la musica nel cuore" | 3:30 |
| 9. | "Ricordati chi sei" | 3:41 |
| 10. | "Le veterane" | 2:43 |
| 11. | "Barbara" | 4:00 |
| 12. | "Ora e mai per sempre" | 4:00 |
| 13. | "Libera" | 3:52 |

== Charts ==
=== Weekly charts ===
| Chart (2014) | Peak position |
|---|---|
| Italian Albums (FIMI) | 1 |
| Swiss Albums (Schweizer Hitparade) | 32 |

=== Monthly charts ===
| Chart (2014) | Peak position |
|---|---|
| Italian Albums (Musica e dischi) | 2 |

=== Year-end charts ===
| Chart (2014) | Position |
|---|---|
| Italian Albums (FIMI) | 5 |
| Chart (2015) | Position |
| Italian Albums (FIMI) | 83 |

== Certifications and sales ==
| Region | Certification | Certified units/sales |
|---|---|---|
| Italy (FIMI) | 2× Platinum | 100,000^{*} |
^{*} Sales figures based on certification alone.
