= Sono innocente =

Studio album by Vasco Rossi
- Released: 4 November 2014
- Recorded: Fonoprint (Bologna, ITA) - Impatto (Bologna ITA) - Nowhere Mobile (Bologna, ITA) - Speakeasy Studios LA (Los Angeles, USA)
- Genre: Pop rock
- Length: 46:55
- Label: Universal
- Producer: Guido Elmi; Vasco Rossi; Celso Valli; Saverio Principini

Vasco Rossi chronology
L'altra metà del cielo (2012)	Sono innocente (2014)

Professional ratings
Review scores
Source	Rating
Rockol	3.5/5 stars

Sono innocente is a studio album by Italian singer-songwriter Vasco Rossi, produced by Guido Elmi and Rossi himself and released by Universal on 4 November 2014. The album was previewed on 30 November 2014, during the Medimex, the annual Exhibition of Music Innovation held in Bari, Apulia.

Despite being released in November, the album became the best-selling record of 2014.

== Track listing ==
Standard edition
No.	Title	Writer(s)	Length
1.	"Sono innocente ma..."	Roberto Casini, Andrea Righi, Vasco Rossi	3:43
2.	"Duro incontro"	V. Rossi	3:40
3.	"Come vorrei"	V. Rossi, Tullio Ferro	4:16
4.	"Guai"	Gaetano Curreri, Saverio Grandi, V. Rossi	4:18
5.	"Lo vedi"	Simone Sello, Saverio Principini, V. Rossi	3:42
6.	"Aspettami"	V. Rossi, Casini	4:24
7.	"Dannate nuvole"	V. Rossi	4:08
8.	"Il blues della chitarra sola"	V. Rossi	3:05
9.	"Accidenti come sei bella"	Casini, V. Rossi	3:59
10.	"Quante volte"	Curreri, Grandi, V. Rossi	4:03
11.	"Cambia-menti"	V. Rossi, Principini, Sello	3:57
12.	"Rock star"	Guido Elmi, Vince Pastano, V. Rossi	3:40

Bonus tracks
No.	Title	Writer(s)	Length
13.	"L'uomo più semplice (Reloaded)"	V. Rossi, Curreri, Andrea Fornili	4:12
14.	"L'ape regina" (feat. Speakeasy Studio)	V. Rossi, Luca Rossi Schmidt	3:27
15.	"Marta piange ancora" (feat. Speakeasy Studio)	V. Rossi, Principini	3:00

== Credits ==
- Vasco Rossi - Producer
- Guido Elmi - Producer (track 1,2,3,5,6,7,8,9,11,12,13)
- Celso Valli - Producer (track 4,10)
- Saverio Principini - Producer, Recording, Mixing Engineer (track 14,15)
- Nicola Venieri - Recording, Mixing Engineer (track 1,2,3,5,6,7,8,9,11,12,13)
- Maurizio Bianconi - Mastering Engineer (track 1,2,3,4,5,6,7,8,9,10,11,12,13)
- Marco Borsatti - Recording, Mixing Engineer (track 4,10)
- Marco Sonzini - Recording, Mixing Engineer (track 14,15)
- Gavin Lurssen - Mastering Engineer (track 14,15)

== Charts ==
=== Weekly charts ===
Chart (2014)	Peak position
Belgian Albums (Ultratop Wallonia)	120
Italian Albums (FIMI)	1
Swiss Albums (Schweizer Hitparade)	4

=== Year-end charts ===
Chart (2014)	Position
Italian Albums (FIMI)	1
Chart (2015)	Position
Italian Albums (FIMI)	15

== Certifications ==
Region	Certification	Certified units/sales
Italy (FIMI)	6× Platinum	300,000^{*}
^{*} Sales figures based on certification alone.

== See also ==
- List of best-selling albums by year (Italy)
