= Arrivederci, mostro! =

2010 Italian music album

Studio album by Ligabue
- Released: 11 May 2010
- Recorded: January–March 2010
- Studios: Zoo Studio, Correggio, Emilia-Romagna
- Genres: Rock; pop
- Length: 53:09
- Label: Warner Music Italy
- Producer: Corrado Rustici

Ligabue chronology
Sette notti in Arena (2009)	Arrivederci, mostro! (2010)	Campovolo 2.011 (2011)

Singles from Arrivederci, mostro!
- 1. "Un colpo all'anima" Released: 16 April 2010; 2. "Quando canterai la tua canzone" Released: 29 June 2010; 3. "La linea sottile" Released: 20 September 2010; 4. "Ci sei sempre stata" Released: 26 November 2010; 5. "Il meglio deve ancora venire" Released: 25 March 2011; 6. "Il peso della valigia" Released: 27 June 2011

Arrivederci, mostro! is the tenth studio album by Italian rock singer-songwriter Luciano Ligabue. Produced by Corrado Rustici, the album was released on 11 May 2010, exactly 20 years after the release of Ligabue's self-titled debut album. After spending its first four weeks at number one on the Italian Albums Chart, Arrivederci, mostro! returned to the top spot three additional times, completing a chart run of nine non-consecutive weeks atop the chart. The album was also certified diamond by the Federation of the Italian Music Industry, and it became the best-selling album of 2010 in Italy.

The song "Quando mi vieni a prendere? (Dendermonde 23/01/09)" was written in dedication to the victims of the 2009 Dendermonde nursery attack.

== Track listing ==
Standard Edition
No.	Title	Writer(s)	Length
1.	"Quando canterai la tua canzone"	Luciano Ligabue	3:34
2.	"La linea sottile"	Ligabue	4:02
3.	"Nel tempo"	Ligabue	3:47
4.	"Ci sei sempre stata"	Ligabue	4:58
5.	"La verità è una scelta"	Ligabue	4:17
6.	"Caro il mio Francesco"	Ligabue	6:00
7.	"Atto di fede"	Ligabue	4:10
8.	"Un colpo all'anima"	Ligabue	3:20
9.	"Il peso della valigia"	Ligabue	4:38
10.	"Taca banda"	Ligabue	2:30
11.	"Quando mi vieni a prendere?"	Ligabue	7:05
12.	"Il meglio deve ancora venire"	Ligabue	4:20

== Charts ==
Chart (2010)	Peak position
Italian Albums (FIMI)	1
Swiss Albums (Schweizer Hitparade)	11

== Certifications ==
Region	Certification	Certified units/sales
Italy (FIMI)	Diamond	300,000^{*}
^{*} Sales figures based on certification alone.

== See also ==
- List of best-selling albums by year (Italy)
