= Biagio Antonacci =

Italian singer-songwriter (born 1963)

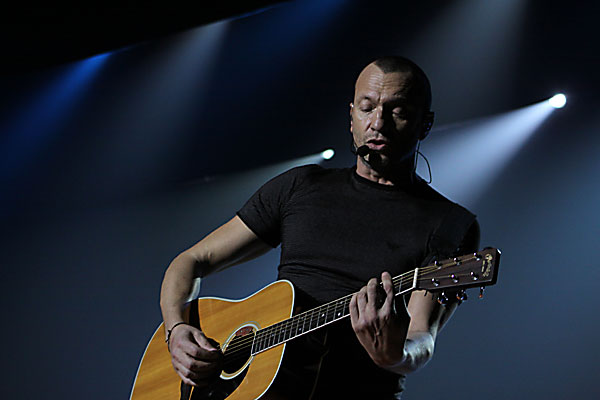
- Antonacci in concert in 2009

Background information
- Born: 9 November 1963 (age 62)
- Origin: Milan, Italy
- Genres: Pop; rock
- Occupations: Singer; songwriter
- Years active: 1988–present
- Website: biagioantonacci.it

Biagio Antonacci (Italian pronunciation: [ˈbjaːdʒo antoˈnattʃi]; born 9 November 1963) is an Italian singer and songwriter.

== Biography ==
=== Early life ===
Biagio Antonacci was born in Milan and was raised in one of its suburbs (Rozzano). Despite learning how to play the drums at a young age, he had to study to obtain a diploma in surveying. He participated in the 38th Sanremo Music Festival in 1988 with the song Voglio vivere in un attimo. He was first signed to a record company in 1989, with his debut album Sono cose che capitano which went unnoticed except for the song Fiore. His second album, Adagio Biagio, was released two years later. He slowly rose to recognition due to his two songs Danza sul mio petto and Però ti amo receiving airtime on the radio. He has two sons with Marianna Morandi, daughter of the Italian singer and actor Gianni Morandi.

=== Success ===
Despite the interest raised from his first two albums, he did not break into the music scene. He was aware that if his third album did not satisfy the expectations of the record company, he would be gambling with his career. In 1992 he released a single from his third album, Liberatemi with which he travelled around Italy participating in the Festivalbar and with which he finally obtained the recognition he deserved. The album Liberatemi, produced by Mauro Malavasi, sold 150,000 copies and ratified the importance of Biagio Antonacci in the world of Italian music. In spite of these commitments, he dedicated his time to another of his passions, football; and became the leader of homegrown singers that aim to benefit charities. In one of these occasions Don Pierino Gelmini and various enterprises collaborated with him on a project for young dropouts to return. In 1993 he participated in the Sanremo Music Festival with the song Non so più a chi credere; in the same year he toured around all of Italy and gained public acknowledgement. 1999 he had a hit single with Viktor Lazlo in Belgium, "It's a Message for You" for her album Amour(s), which peaked at No. 7 on the Belgian single charts and remained there for 17 weeks. On 1 September 2005 in Hollywood, Biagio Antonacci received the World Music Award for "Best-Selling Male Italian Artist" for over a million copies of his two-part album Convivendo sold by early November.

== Discography ==
=== Studio albums ===
- 1989: Sono cose che capitano
- 1991: Adagio Biagio
- 1992: Liberatemi (ITA: 2× Platinum)
- 1994: Biagio Antonacci (ITA: 5× Platinum)
- 1996: Il mucchio (ITA: 5× Platinum)
- 1998: Mi fai stare bene (ITA: Diamond)
- 2001: 9/nov/2001
- 2004: Convivendo parte 1 (ITA: 6× Platinum)
- 2005: Convivendo parte 2 (ITA: 8× Platinum)
- 2007: Vicky Love (ITA: 5× Platinum)
- 2010: Inaspettata (ITA: 3× Platinum)
- 2012: Sapessi dire no (ITA: 2× Platinum)
- 2014: L'amore comporta
- 2017: Dediche e manie
- 2019: Chiaramente visibili dallo spazio

=== Compilations ===
- 1993: Non so piu' a chi credere
- 2000: Tra le mie canzoni (compilation with two new tracks)
- 2008: Best of Biagio Antonacci 1989–2000 (double CD) (ITA: Platinum)
- 2008: Best of Biagio Antonacci 2001–2007 (ITA: Gold)
- 2008: Il cielo ha una porta sola (includes re-recorded hits) (ITA: 3× Platinum)

=== Special editions ===
- 1999: Mi fai stare bene LE (limited edition with CD-ROM)
- 2003: Cuanto tiempo...y ahora (for the Spanish and South American markets)
- 2005: Convivendo (Part I and Part II + DVD)

== Videography ==
- 2000: Live in Palermo (concert on 10 July 1999)
- 2005: ConVivo (concerts throughout April 2005 at the Forum di Assago)
