= Luciano Ligabue =

Italian singer-songwriter (born 1960)

Ligabue
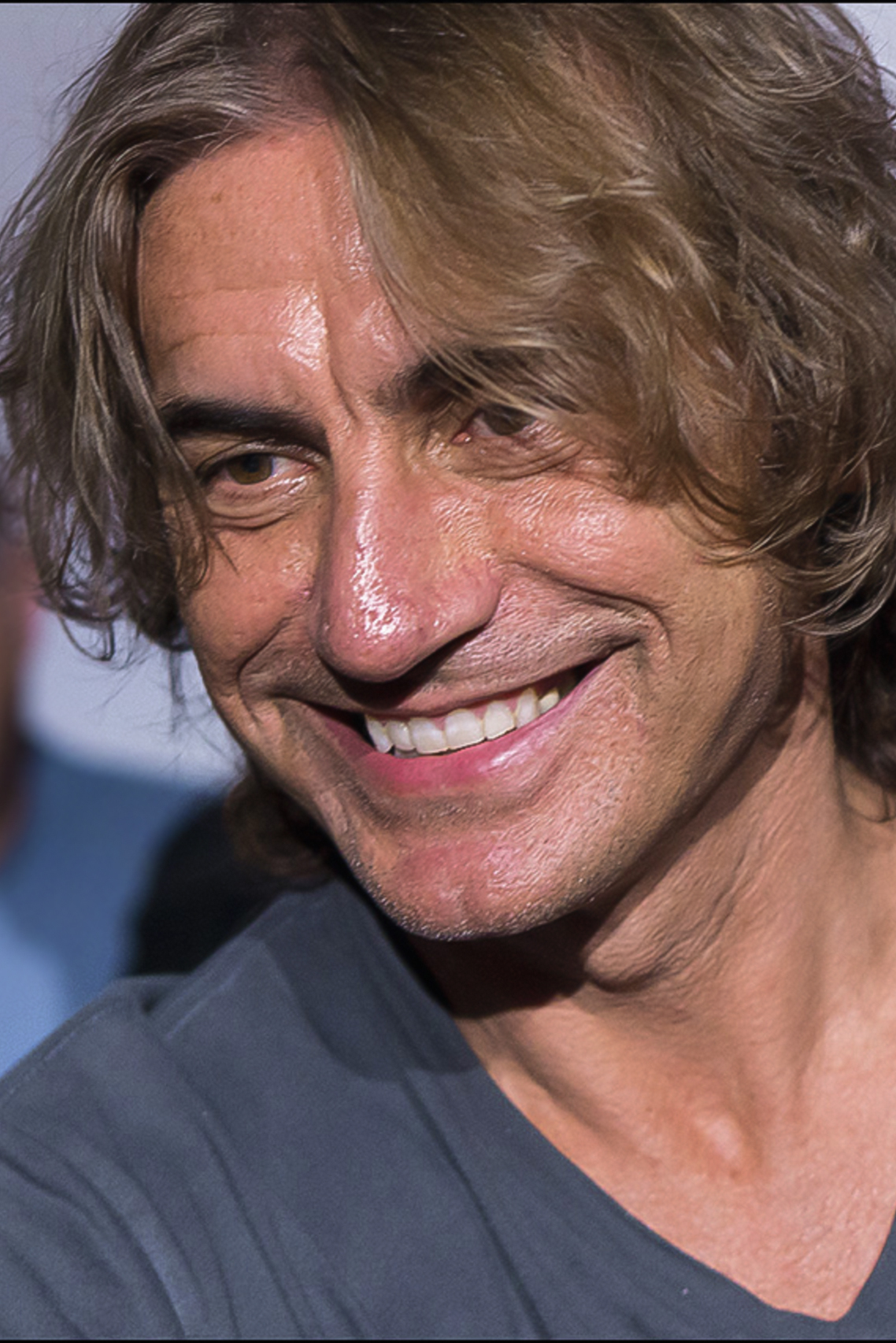
- Ligabue in 2012

Background information
- Born: Luciano Riccardo Ligabue; 13 March 1960 (age 66)
- Origin: Correggio, Reggio Emilia, Italy
- Genres: Rock
- Occupations: Singer; songwriter; composer; multi-instrumentalist; film director; screenwriter; producer; author
- Instruments: Vocals; guitar; piano; bouzouki; banjo
- Years active: 1986–present
- Website: www.ligabue.com

Luciano Riccardo Ligabue (born 13 March 1960), commonly known as Ligabue or Liga, is an Italian singer-songwriter, film director, and writer.

== Biography ==
Ligabue was born in Correggio, in the province of Reggio Emilia (Emilia-Romagna in northern Italy). Before becoming a successful singer, he held various jobs, working in agriculture and in factories. He entered the music world in 1987 when he founded the amateur band Orazero. For this band, he wrote several original songs, with which they participated in several local and national contests. The following year his fellow Emilian singer-songwriter Pierangelo Bertoli was the first to discover Ligabue's writing talents, and included one of Ligabue's songs, "Sogni di Rock'n'Roll" ("Rock n roll dreams"), in his new LP.

The following year Bertoli introduced him to producer Angelo Carrara, to finish an LP of his own, Ligabue, which was released in May 1990. Ligabue soon gained fame as one of the most successful Italian rock stars, finding fans mainly among younger audiences. His most famous hits include Balliamo sul mondo (Let's Dance on the World), Ho perso le parole (I've lost words) and the most successful of all, Certe Notti (Certain Nights), which was voted as "Italian song of the 1990s" in a poll held by a popular music magazine. He also collaborated with another famous singer-songwriter, Francesco Guccini, who also had a part in Ligabue's first movie.

Ligabue directed his first movie, Radiofreccia, in 1998, a semi-autobiographical story of a local radio station. Critics acclaimed it as surprisingly well shot for a newcomer, and the film received three David di Donatello Awards (the highest award in Italian cinema). He also composed the soundtrack. Four years later he shot Da zero a dieci ("From Zero to Ten"): however, it was not as well-received as the first work, by both critics and fans.

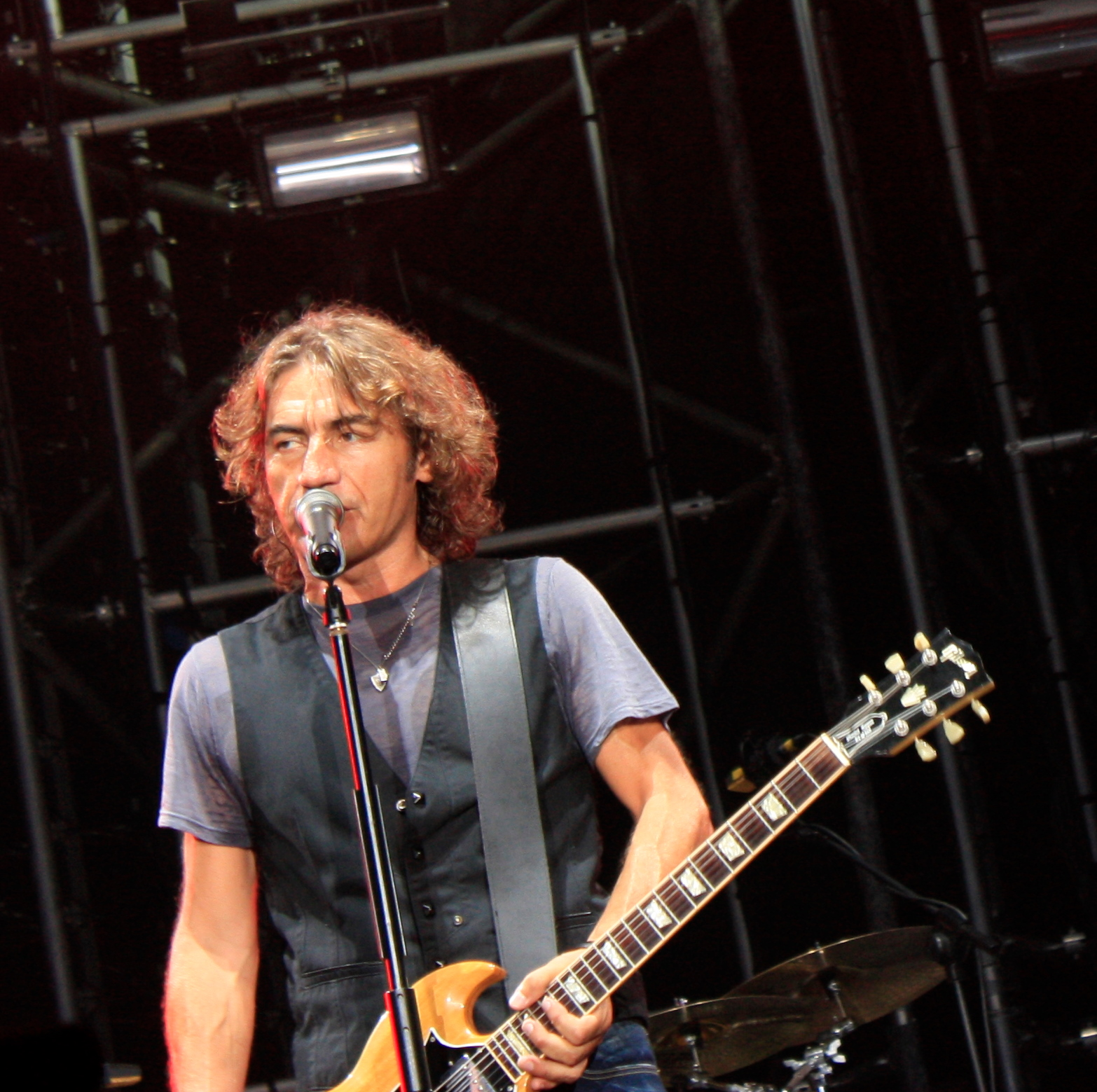
Ligabue performing in Turin on 2010–09–18

On 10 September 2005, Ligabue held a concert in Reggio Emilia to celebrate his first 15 years of activity. The audience of around 180,000 set a European audience record for the one, non-free event for a single artist. However, due to problems with the audio system, several thousand people were unable to listen to the music and left the concert early. Ligabue later apologized for the problems.

Ligabue has also published a short story collection, Fuori e dentro il Borgo ("In and out the village"), which won several literary awards, a science fiction novel La neve se ne frega ("Snow doesn't care") (2005), and collections of poems Lettere d'Amore nel frigo ("Love Letters in the fridge") (2006).

He considers himself a "believer", even if he shows strong criticism towards the traditional teachings of the Catholic Church.

He is an Inter Milan fan.

== Political involvement ==
In the 1980s Ligabue was a member of the communal council of his native Correggio, elected for the Italian Communist Party. Though he no longer assumes a public high-level political position, Ligabue, together with Jovanotti and Piero Pelù, released in 1999 the single "Il mio nome è mai più" ("My Name Is Never Again"), a song against the Kosovo War to collect funds for the Italian NGO Emergency.

== Discography ==
- Ligabue (1990)
- Lambrusco coltelli rose & popcorn (1991)
- Sopravvissuti e sopravviventi (1993)
- A che ora è la fine del mondo? (1994)
- Buon compleanno Elvis! (1995)
- Su e giù da un palco (1997)
- Radiofreccia (1998)
- Miss Mondo (1999)
- Fuori come va? (2002)
- Giro d'Italia (2003)
- Nome e Cognome (2005)
- Primo tempo (2007)
- Secondo tempo (2008)
- Sette notti in Arena (2009)
- Arrivederci, mostro! (2010)
- Campovolo 2.011 (2011)
- Mondovisione (2013)
- Giro Del Mondo (2015)
- Made in Italy (2016)
- Start (2019)
- 7 (2020)
- Dedicato a Noi (2023)

== Tour and live ==
NAME TOUR	YEAR/DATE	LOCATION
Neverending tour	1990–1993	square, club, palasport, theatre
Buon compleanno Elvis! Tour	1995–1996	palasport
Il Bar Mario è aperto	1997	stadium
Buon compleanno Elvis! Tour – Europa	1997	club (Europe)
Miss Mondo tour	1999	palasport, Verona Arena
1990–2000: 10 anni sulla mia strada	2000	stadium
LigaLive	2002	stadium
Fuori come va? Tour	2002–2003	palasport
Ligabue in teatro	2002–2003	theatre
Campovolo	10 September 2005	airport "Campovolo" in Reggio Emilia
Nome e cognome tour 2006	2006	club, palasport, stadium, theatre
Ellesette	November – December 2007	PalaLottomatica, Mediolanum Forum
European tour	2008	club (Europe)
ElleElle Stadi	2008	stadium
...Sette Notti in Arena, Orchestra e R'N'R!	September – October 2008	Verona Arena
Live 2009	2009	club (Europe)
Ligabue con la sua band Solo Rock'n'roll	19–20 September 2009	Verona Arena
Ligabue con la band e l'orchestra dell'Arena di Verona; Sette notti... non-bastano!!	September – October 2009	Verona Arena
Stadi 2010	2010	stadium
Tour Teatri "Quasi Acustico" 2011	2011	Theatre
Campovolo 2.0	16 July 2011	airport Reggio Emilia
Sotto bombardamento rock in...	May-June 2012	Royal Albert Hall in London, Piazza Grande in Locarno, Piazza del Plebiscito in Naples, Parco della Lesa in Cividale del Friuli, Teatro antico di Taormina in Taormina
Ligabue Live	4-5 April 2013	Royal Albert Hall in London
Ligabue in Arena 2013	16-17-19-20-22-23 September 2013	Verona Arena
Mondovisione Tour	March 2014-April 2015	palasport, stadium, club (Canada, U.S.A., Brazil, Argentina, Australia, Japan, China)
Campovolo-La festa 2015	19 September 2015	airport Reggio Emilia
Liga Rock Park 2016	24-25 September 2016	Monza Park, Monza
Dedicato a Noi Indoor Tour	September - December 2023	palasport

== Filmography ==
Year	Title	Credited as				Role	Notes
Year	Title	Writer	Director	Actor	Soundtrack	Role	Notes
1997	Partigiani	No		Yes	No	Himself	Documentary film
1998	Radiofreccia	Yes				Deejay	Debut as director and screenwriter
2002	Da zero a dieci	Yes		No	Yes	—	Second film as a director and writer
2010	Niente Paura	No		Yes		Himself	Documentary film
2018	Made in Italy	Yes		No	Yes	—	Third film as a director and writer

== Bibliography ==
- Fuori e dentro il Borgo ("In and out the village") (1997)
- La neve se ne frega ("Snow doesn't care") (2004)
- Lettere d'amore nel frigo ("Love Letters in the fridge") (2006)
- Made in Italy (2018)
