= Jovanotti discography =

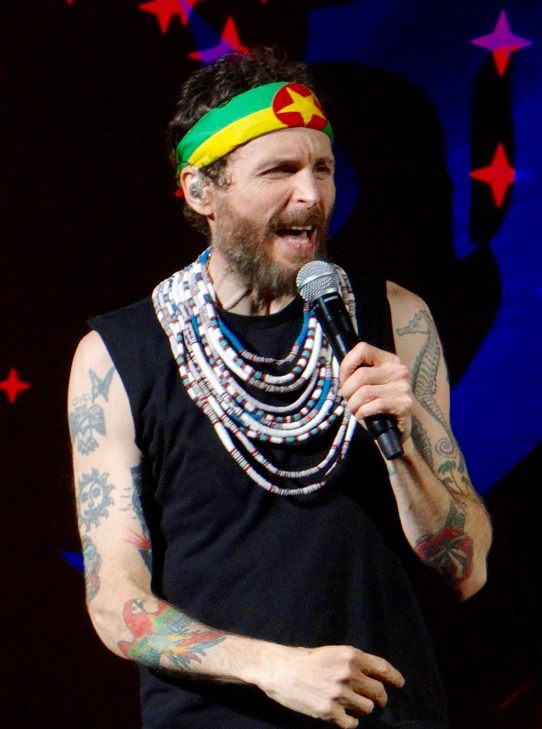
- Jovanotti in 2016
- Studio albums: 18
- Soundtrack albums: 1
- Live albums: 7
- Compilation albums: 6
- Singles: 82
- Video albums: 5
- Music videos: 59
- Side projects: 1

The discography of Lorenzo Cherubini, an Italian singer-songwriter better known as Jovanotti, consists of eighteen studio albums, six compilation albums, a remix album, seven live albums, four video albums and eighty-two singles, including seventy as a lead artist and twelve as a featured artist.

After releasing his debut single, "Walking", which became a minor hit in Italy in 1987, Jovanotti reached commercial success in 1988, when he released the single "Gimme Five", which topped the Italian Singles Chart in Musica e dischi magazine. The song was later included in Jovanotti's first album, Jovanotti for President, which sold more than 400,000 copies in Italy and spawned three other top 5 singles in Italy.

Jovanotti for presidents's follow-up, La mia moto, confirmed Jovanotti's success in his home country, selling more than 600,000 copies, while in 1990's Giovani Jovanotti obtained a very poor commercial reception. During the next years, Jovanotti was able to re-gain popularity, scoring nine number-one albums in Italy between 1994 and 2012, including the greatest hits Lorenzo 1990-1995 and Backup - Lorenzo 1987-2012. As of 2012, Cherubini has also released eight number-one singles as a lead singer and two as a featured artist.

In the late 1980s, Jovanotti also released two dance singles under the pseudonym Gino Latino, while in 2003 he released a Latin music album, titled Roma, together with other musicians under the name Colletivo Soleluna.

During his career, Jovanotti recorded songs with several Italian and international artists, including Ben Harper, Michael Franti & Spearhead, Mousse T., Gianna Nannini, Pino Daniele, Negramaro, Luciano Ligabue and Piero Pelù.

As a songwriter, he adapted songs in Italian for Jarabe de Palo and Miguel Bosé and he penned original songs for several Italian artists, including Zucchero Fornaciari, Adriano Celentano, Giorgia and Irene Grandi.

== Albums ==
=== Studio albums ===
List of albums, with selected chart positions, sales, and certifications
Title	Album details	Peak chart positions						Sales	Certifications
Title	Album details	ITA	AUT	BEL (WA)	GER	SWI	US World	Sales	Certifications
Jovanotti for President	First studio album; Released: 1988; Label: Ibiza Records; Format: LP, cassette	3	—	—	—	—	—	ITA: 400,000	
La mia moto	Second studio album; Released: 1989; Label: Ibiza Records	4	—	—	—	—	—	ITA: 600,000	
Giovani Jovanotti	Third studio album; Released: 1990; Label: Ibiza Records	—	—	—	—	—	—		
Una tribù che balla	Fourth studio album; Released: 1991; Label: Free Records Independent	11	—	—	—	—	—		FIMI: Gold
Lorenzo 1992	Fifth studio album; Released: 5 April 1992; Label: Free Records Independent	4	—	—	—	—	—		
Lorenzo 1994	Sixth studio album; Released: 10 January 1994; Label: Soleluna, Mercury	1	23	—	34	17	—	ITA: 600,000	IFPI SWI: Gold
Lorenzo 1997 - L'albero	Seventh studio album; Released: 30 January 1997; Label: Soleluna, Mercury Records	1	15	—	—	10	—	ITA: 500,000	FIMI: 5× Platinum; IFPI SWI: Gold
Lorenzo 1999 - Capo Horn	Eighth studio album; Released: 13 May 1999; Label: Soleluna, Mercury	1	24	—	—	10	—	ITA: 500,000	FIMI: 5× Platinum
Lorenzo 2002 - Il quinto mondo	Ninth studio album; Released: 1 February 2002; Label: Soleluna, Mercury, Universal; Format: CD	1	20	—	—	11	—		FIMI: 3× Platinum; IFPI SWI: Gold
Buon sangue	Tenth studio album; Released: 13 May 2005; Label: Soleluna, Universal; Format: CD, digital download	1	49	—	—	9	—	ITA: 250,000	FIMI: 5× Platinum
Safari	Eleventh studio album; Released: 18 January 2008; Label: Soleluna; Format: CD, digital download	1	70	—	—	4	—	ITA: 600,000	FIMI: 5× Platinum; IFPI SWI: Gold
Ora	Twelfth studio album; Released: 25 January 2011; Label: Universal; Format: CD, digital download	1	69	—	—	2	—	ITA: 500,000	FIMI: Diamond; IFPI SWI: Gold
Lorenzo 2015 CC.	Thirteenth studio album; Released: 24 February 2015; Label: Universal; Format: CD, LP, digital download	1	—	62	—	3	13	ITA: 250,000	FIMI: 5× Platinum
Oh, vita!	Fourteenth studio album; Released: 1 December 2017; Label: Universal; Format: CD, LP, digital download	1	70	82	—	4	—		FIMI: 4× Platinum
Jova Beach Party	Fifteenth studio album; Released: 7 June 2019; Label: Universal; Format: CD, LP, digital download	1	—	—	—	19	—		FIMI: Gold
Lorenzo sulla luna	Sixteenth studio album; Released: 29 November 2019; Label: Universal; Format: CD, LP, digital download	8	—	—	—	33	—		
Il disco del Sole	Seventeenth studio album; Released: 9 December 2022; Label: Universal; Format: CD, LP, digital download	3	—	—	—	15	—		FIMI: Gold
Il corpo umano Vol. 1	Eighteenth studio album; Released: 30 January 2025; Label: Universal; Format: CD, LP, digital download	1	—	—	—	8	—		FIMI: Platinum
"—" denotes albums that did not chart or were not released.

=== Soundtrack albums ===
List of albums, with selected chart positions, sales, and certifications
Title	Album details	Peak chart positions
Title	Album details	ITA
L'estate addosso	Released: 2 September 2016; Label: Universal; Format: LP, CD, download	21

=== Compilation albums ===
List of albums, with selected chart positions, sales, and certifications
Title	Album details	Peak chart positions					Certifications
Title	Album details	ITA	AUT	BEL (WA)	SWI	US World	Certifications
Jovanotti Special	First compilation album; Released: 1989; Label: Mercury	—	—	—	—	—	
Lorenzo 1990–1995	Second compilation album; Released: October 1995; Label: Soleluna, Mercury	1	8	—	14	—	FIMI: Gold; IFPI AUT: Gold; IFPI SWI: Gold
Pasaporte – Lo mejor de	Third compilation album; Released: 28 May 2001; Label: Mercury, Universal	—	—	—	67	—	
ElectroJova – Buon sangue dopato	First remix album; Released: 23 June 2006; Label: Mercury, Universal	—	—	—	—	—	
Italia 1988–2012	Released in the U.S. only; Released: 7 August 2012; Label: ATO Records	—	—	—	—	14	
Backup – Lorenzo 1987–2012	Released: 27 November 2012; Label: Universal; Formats: 2×CD, 4×CD, 7×CD+2×DVD	1	—	177	44	—	FIMI: 6× Platinum
"—" denotes albums that did not chart or were not released.

=== Live albums ===
List of albums, with selected chart positions, sales, and certifications
Title	Album details	Peak chart positions		Certifications
Title	Album details	ITA	SWI	Certifications
Lorenzo Live - Autobiografia di una festa	First live album; Released: October 2000; Label: Soleluna	6	71	
Jova Live 2002	Released: 21 December 2004; Label: Universal Music; Format: digital download	—	—	
OYEAH	Released: 4 December 2009 (US only); Label: Verve Records; Format: CD, digital download	—	—	
Ora Live	Released: 29 November 2011; Label: Universal Music; Format: CD, digital download	—	—	
Lorenzo in concerto per Jovanotti e Orchestra	Released: 6 March 2012; Label: Universal Music; Format: CD, digital download	—	—	
Lorenzo negli stadi - Backup tour 2013	Released: 19 November 2013; Label: Soleluna, Universal; Format: 2×CD + 2×DVD, digital download	4	—	FIMI: Platinum
Jova! Live! Love!	Released: 26 June 2025; Label: Universal; Format: 2×CD, digital download	20	91	
"—" denotes albums that did not chart or were not released.

=== Side projects ===
List of albums, with additional details
Title	Album details
Roma	Album by Collettivo Soleluna; Released: 20 June 2003; Label: Universal

== Video albums ==
List of video albums, with selected chart positions
Title	Album details	Peak chart positions
Title	Album details	ITA
Buon sangue live	Released: 29 May 2006; Label: Mercury; Format: DVD	1
Corri Lore'	Released: 20 April 2007; Label: Mercury; Format: DVD	10
Nessuna ombra intorno	Released: 21 November 2008; Label: Universal; Format: DVD	3
OYEAH	Released: 17 December 2009; Label: Universal; Format: DVD	8
Live Ora in tour	Released: 29 November 2011; Label: Universal; Format: DVD	2

== Singles ==
=== As lead singer ===
==== 1988–1989 ====
List of singles, with selected chart positions, showing year released and album name
Single	Year	Peak chart positions						Album
Single	Year	ITA	IRE	NLD	SWI	UK	US Dance Club	Album
"Walking"	1987	27	—	—	—	—	—	Non-album single
"Gimme Five"	1988	1	—	79	11	—	—	Jovanotti for President
"Go Jovanotti Go"	1988	5	—	—	—	—	—	Jovanotti for President
"Gimme Five 2 (Rasta Five)"	1988	1	—	—	—	—	—	Jovanotti for President
"Mix, Remix & The singers"	1988	3	—	—	—	—	—	Jovanotti for President
"The Rappers (Remix)"	1988	31	—	—	—	—	—	Jovanotti for President
"Reggae '87"	1988	27	—	—	—	—	—	Non-album single
"Yo" (as Gino Latino)	1988	7	—	—	—	—	—	Jovanotti Special
"È qui la festa?"	1988	1	—	—	—	—	—	Jovanotti Special
"Welcome" (as Gino Latino)	1988	6	26	—	—	17	19	Jovanotti Special
"Sex, No Drugs and Rock'n'Roll"	1989	2	—	—	—	—	—	Non-album single
"La mia moto"	1989	—	—	—	—	—	—	La mia moto
"Vasco"	1989	2	—	—	—	—	—	La mia moto
"Scappa con me"	1989	4	—	—	—	—	—	La mia moto
"—" denotes singles that did not chart or were not released.

==== 1990–1994 ====
List of singles, with selected chart positions, showing year released and album name
Single	Year	Peak chart positions				Certifications	Album
Single	Year	ITA	BEL (FL)	GER	NLD	Certifications	Album
"Ciao mamma"	1990	16	—	—	—		Giovani Jovanotti
"Gente della notte"	1990	6	—	—	—		Giovani Jovanotti
"Los numeros"	1990	—	—	—	—		Giovani Jovanotti (Spanish Edition)
"Muoviti muoviti"	1991	7	—	—	—		Una tribù che balla
"One Nation"	1991	—	—	—	—		Una tribù che balla
"Libera l'anima"	1991	—	7	—	9		Una tribù che balla
"Benvenuti nella giungla"	1992	15	—	—	—		Lorenzo 1992
"Chissà se stai dormendo"	1992	—	—	—	—		Lorenzo 1992
"Non m'annoio"	1992	3	—	—	—		Lorenzo 1992
"Ragazzo fortunato"	1992	—	—	—	—	FIMI: Gold	Lorenzo 1992
"Io no"	1993	2	—	—	—		Lorenzo 1992
"Penso positivo"	1994	2	—	—	—		Lorenzo 1994
"Serenata rap"	1994	1	—	20	—	FIMI: Gold	Lorenzo 1994
"Voglio di +"	1994	7	—	—	—		Lorenzo 1994
"Piove"	1994	12	—	—	—		Lorenzo 1994
"—" denotes singles that did not chart or were not released.

==== 1995–2004 ====
List of singles, with selected chart positions and certifications, showing year released and album name
Single	Year	Peak chart positions				Certifications	Album
Single	Year	ITA	AUT	NLD	SWI	Certifications	Album
"L'ombelico del mondo"	1995	14	23	17	—	FIMI: Gold	Lorenzo 1990–1995
"Marco Polo"	1995	—	—	—	—		Lorenzo 1990–1995
"Bella"	1997	—	—	—	39	FIMI: Platinum	Lorenzo 1997 – L'albero
"Questa è la mia casa"	1997	12	—	—	—		Lorenzo 1997 – L'albero
"Per la vita che verrà"	1997	—	—	—	—		Lorenzo 1997 – L'albero
"Per te"	1999	1	—	—	—	FIMI: Gold	Lorenzo 1999 – Capo Horn
"Un raggio di sole"	1999	7	—	—	—	FIMI: Gold	Lorenzo 1999 – Capo Horn
"Stella cometa"	1999	26	—	—	—		Lorenzo 1999 – Capo Horn
"Dolce fare niente"	1999	29	—	—	—		Lorenzo 1999 – Capo Horn
"File Not Found"	2000	—	—	—	—		Lorenzo Live – Autobiografia di una festa
"El ombligo del mundo"	2001	—	—	—	—		Pasaporte – Lo mejor de
"Un rayo de sol en la mano"	2001	—	—	—	—		Pasaporte – Lo mejor de
"Salvami"	2002	1	—	—	44		Lorenzo 2002 – Il quinto mondo
"Ti sposerò"	2002	11	—	—	—		Lorenzo 2002 – Il quinto mondo
"Morirò d'amore"	2002	13	—	—	—		Lorenzo 2002 – Il quinto mondo
"Date al diavolo un bimbo per cena"	2002	—	—	—	—		Lorenzo 2002 – Il quinto mondo
"—" denotes singles that did not chart or were not released.

==== 2005–present ====
List of singles, with selected chart positions and certifications, showing year released and album name
Single	Year	Peak chart positions				Certifications	Album
Single	Year	ITA	EUR	GER	SWI	Certifications	Album
"(Tanto)³"	2005	6	—	—	—		Buon sangue
"Mi fido di te"	2005	—^{[A]}	—	65	—	FIMI: Platinum	Buon sangue
"Una storia d'amore"	2006	—	—	—	—		Buon sangue
"Falla girare"	2006	—^{[B]}	—	—	—		Buon sangue
"Fango" (with Ben Harper)	2007	4	—	—	—		Safari
"A te"	2008	1	82	—	21	FIMI: 5× Platinum	Safari
"Safari" (with Giuliano Sangiorgi)	2008	16	—	—	—		Safari
"Come musica"	2008	8	—	—	—	FIMI: Gold	Safari
"Mezzogiorno"	2009	26	—	—	—		Safari
"Punto" (feat. Sérgio Mendes)	2009	12	—	—	—		Safari
"Baciami ancora"	2010	1	—	—	54	FIMI: 3× Platinum	Non-album single
"Tutto l'amore che ho"	2010	1	—	—	22	FIMI: 3× Platinum	Ora
"Le tasche piene di sassi"	2011	2	—	—	—	FIMI: 2× Platinum	Ora
"Il più grande spettacolo dopo il Big Bang"	2011	2	—	—	—	FIMI: 2× Platinum	Ora
"La notte dei desideri"	2011	6	—	—	—	FIMI: Platinum	Ora
"Ora"	2011	6	—	—	—	FIMI: Gold	Ora
"Tensione evolutiva"	2012	6	—	—	—	FIMI: Platinum	Backup – Lorenzo 1987–2012
"Terra degli uomini"	2013	65	—	—	—		Backup – Lorenzo 1987–2012
"Ti porto via con me"	2013	10	—	—	—	FIMI: Platinum	Backup – Lorenzo 1987–2012
"Estate"	2013	5	—	—	—	FIMI: Platinum	Backup – Lorenzo 1987–2012
"Sabato"	2014	4	—	—	—	FIMI: 3× Platinum	Lorenzo 2015 CC.
"Gli immortali"	2015	31	—	—	—	FIMI: 2× Platinum	Lorenzo 2015 CC.
"L'estate addosso"	2015	8	—	—	—	FIMI: 3× Platinum	Lorenzo 2015 CC.
"Pieno di vita"	2015	70	—	—	—	FIMI: Platinum	Lorenzo 2015 CC.
"E non hai visto ancora niente"	2016	75	—	—	—	FIMI: Gold	Lorenzo 2015 CC.
"Ragazza magica"	2016	25	—	—	—	FIMI: 2× Platinum	Lorenzo 2015 CC.
"Oh, vita!"	2017	7	—	—	—	FIMI: Platinum	Oh, vita!
"Le canzoni"	2018	59	—	—	—	FIMI: Gold	Oh, vita!
"Affermativo"	2018	—	—	—	—		Oh, vita!
"Viva la libertà"	2018	—	—	—	—	FIMI: Gold	Oh, vita!
"Chiaro di luna"	2018	51	—	—	—	FIMI: Platinum	Oh, vita!
"Nuova era"	2019	38	—	—	—	FIMI: Platinum	Jova Beach Party
"Prima che diventi giorno"	2019	—	—	—	—		Jova Beach Party
"I Love You Baby" (with SixPM)	2022	2	—	—	—	FIMI: 4× Platinum	Mediterraneo
"Sensibile all'estate" (with SixPM)	2022	87	—	—	—		Jova Beach Party: Karaoke con gli amici
"Diamanti" (with Negramaro and Elisa)	2023	40	—	—	—	FIMI: Platinum	Non-album single
"Montecristo"	2024	79	—	—	—		Il corpo umano Vol. 1
"Fuorionda"	2025	68	—	—	—		Il corpo umano Vol. 1
"Un mondo a parte"	2025	27	—	—	—	FIMI: Gold	Il corpo umano Vol. 1
"Oceanica" (with Merk & Kremont)	2025	17	—	—	—	FIMI: Gold	Non-album single
"So solo che la vita" (with Felipe Hostins, Gil Oliveira and Ronaldo Andrade)	2025	70	—	—	—		Niuiorcherubini (Brooklyn Studio, Jova Session 25)
"Buon vento" (with Alfa)	2026	12	—	—	—	FIMI: Gold	Non-album single
"—" denotes singles that did not chart or were not released.

=== As featured artist ===
List of singles, with selected chart positions and certifications, showing year released and album name
Single	Year	Peak chart positions		Certifications	Album
Single	Year	ITA	BEL (WA)	Certifications	Album
"Radio Baccano" (Gianna Nannini featuring Jovanotti)	1993	2	—		X forza e X amore
"Il mio nome è mai più" (Luciano Ligabue, Jovanotti & Piero Pelù)	1999	1	—	FIMI: 10× Platinum	Charity single
"A vida" (Collettivo Soleluna)	2003	—	—		Roma
"Do d'freak" (Collettivo Soleluna featuring Planet Funk)	2003	13	—		Roma
"Cade la pioggia" (Negramaro with Jovanotti)	2006	15	—		La finestra
"J'ai confiance en toi (Mi fido di te)"^{[C]} (Marc Lavoine & Jovanotti)	2007	—	52		Les Duos de Marc
"Domani 21/04.09" (Artisti Uniti per l'Abruzzo)	2009	1	—	FIMI: 2× Platinum	Charity single
"Mondo" (Cesare Cremonini featuring Jovanotti)	2010	4	—	FIMI: Platinum	1999–2010 The Greatest Hits
"All Nite Long (D.I.S.C.O)" (Mousse T., Suzie & Jovanotti)	2010	—	—		Non-album single
"The Sound of Sunshine" (Michael Franti & Spearhead featuring Jovanotti)	2011	3	—	FIMI: Platinum	The Sound of Sunshine
"A muso duro" (Italia Loves Emilia)	2012	20	—		Italia Loves Emilia – Il concerto
"In questa grande città (la prima cumbia)" (Tre Allegri Ragazzi Morti featuring Jovanotti)	2016	—	—		Inumani
"La luna e la gatta" (Takagi & Ketra featuring Tommaso Paradiso, Jovanotti & Calcutta)	2019	9	—	FIMI: Platinum	Non-album single
"Balla per me" (Tiziano Ferro featuring Jovanotti)	2020	36	—	FIMI: Platinum	Accetto miracoli
"Palla al centro" (Elisa featuring Jovanotti)	2022	—	—		Ritorno al futuro/Back to the Future
"Evviva!" (Gianni Morandi featuring Jovanotti)	2023	—	—		Evviva!
"—" denotes singles that did not chart or were not released.

== Other charted songs ==
List of charted songs, with positions, showing year released and album name
Single	Year	Peak chart positions	Certifications	Album
Single	Year	ITA	Certifications	Album
"Dove ho visto te"	2008	—^{[D]}		Safari
"Quando sarò vecchio"	2011	62		Ora
"Amami"	2011	78		Ora
"Un'illusione"	2011	82		Ora
"La bella vita (La belle vie)" (featuring Amadou & Mariam)	2011	86		Ora
"L'elemento umano"	2011	87		Ora
"L'alba"	2015	45		Lorenzo 2015 CC.
"Musica" (featuring Manu Dibango)	2015	56		Lorenzo 2015 CC.
"Il cielo immenso"	2015	40		Lorenzo 2015 CC.
"Si alza il vento" (featuring Bombino)	2015	63		Lorenzo 2015 CC.
"Un bene dell'anima"	2015	60		Lorenzo 2015 CC.
"Le storie vere"	2015	64		Lorenzo 2015 CC.
"Tutto acceso"	2015	68		Lorenzo 2015 CC.
"Canzone" (Rkomi featuring Jovanotti)	2019	23		Dove gli occhi non-arrivano

== Other album appearances ==
List of other album appearances
Contribution	Year	Album
"Peggio per te" (Nikki & Jovanotti)	1992	W Radio Dee Jay 1992
"O è Natale tutti i giorni" (Luca Carboni featuring Jovanotti)	1993	Diario Carboni
"Vedo risorgere il sole" (Luca Carboni featuring Jovanotti)	1993	Diario Carboni
"Mix 1992 (Le storie d'amore / Puttane e spose)" (Luca Carboni featuring Jovanotti)	1993	Diario Carboni
"Serenata rap / Mattinata" (Live) (Luciano Pavarotti & Jovanotti)	1995	Pavarotti & Friends Together for the Children of Bosnia (DVD)
"Penso positivo" (Live)	1995	Pavarotti & Friends Together for the Children of Bosnia (DVD)
"Canzoni al cielo" (Manrico Mologni featuring Jovanotti)	1995	Canzoni al cielo
"Just a Villain" (Gary Thomas featuring Jovanotti)	1995	Overkill
"Un deserto di parole" (Pino Daniele featuring Jovanotti)	1995	Non calpestare i fiori nel deserto
"Stress" (Pino Daniele featuring Jovanotti)	1995	Non calpestare i fiori nel deserto
"I Got Rhythm"	1998	Red Hot + Rhapsody: The Gershwin Groove
"Tiempo" (Jarabe de Palo featuring Jovanotti)	2001	De vuelta y vuelta
"Cloro" (883 featuring Jovanotti)	2001	Uno in più
"Nel blu, dipinto di blu" (Demo Morselli featuring Jovanotti)	2002	Old and New Swing
"Ive Brussel" (Live) (Daniela Mercury featuring Jovanotti)	2003	MTV ao Vivo – Eletrodoméstico
"Alzando gli occhi al cielo" (Live) (Luca Carboni featuring Jovanotti)	2003	Luca Carboni live
"Mi ami davvero" (Live) (Luca Carboni featuring Jovanotti)	2003	Luca Carboni live
"O è Natale tutti i giorni" (Live) (Luca Carboni featuring Jovanotti)	2003	Luca Carboni live
"Da raccontarti all'alba" (Gianni Maroccolo featuring Jovanotti)	2004	A.C.A.U. – La nostra meraviglia
"Sei volata via" (Ron featuring Jovanotti)	2005	Ma quando dici amore
"Detto tra noi" (Edoardo Bennato featuring Jovanotti)	2005	La fantastica storia del Pifferaio Magico
"Big Fish" (Planet Funk featuring Jovanotti)	2006	Static
"Prendi l'onda" (Fiamma Fumana featuring Jovanotti)	2006	Onda
"Serenata rap" (Sin Bandera featuring Jovanotti)	2006	Pasado
"Lugar comum" (Sérgio Mendes featuring Jovanotti)	2008	Encanto
"Più" (Ornella Vanoni featuring Jovanotti)	2008	Più di me
"Io so che ti amerò" (Ornella Vanoni featuring Jovanotti)	2008	Più di me
"Caruso" (Live) (Laura Pausini & Jovanotti)	2009	The Tribute to Pavarotti - One Amazing Weekend in Petra (DVD)
"A te" (Live)	2009	The Tribute to Pavarotti - One Amazing Weekend in Petra (DVD)
"Guarda che luna" (Live)	2009	The Tribute to Pavarotti - One Amazing Weekend in Petra (DVD)
"Con tutto il mio cuore" (Claudio Baglioni featuring Jovanotti & Fabrizio Bosso)	2009	Q.P.G.A.
"Vecchia scuola" (J Ax featuring Jovanotti)	2009	Deca Dance
"Mirarte" (Miguel Bosé featuring Jovanotti)	2012	Papitwo
"Si può" (Live, Giorgio Gaber cover)	2012	...Io ci sono
"Tu mi porti su" (Live, Giorgia with Jovanotti)	2012	Italia Loves Emilia – Il concerto
"Clandestino" (Live, Fiorella Mannoia with Jovanotti, Manu Chao cover)	2012	Italia Loves Emilia – Il concerto
"Via le mani dagli occhi" (Live, Negramaro with Elisa and Jovanotti)	2012	Italia Loves Emilia – Il concerto
"La notte dei desideri" (Live)	2012	Italia Loves Emilia – Il concerto
"Il più grande spettacolo dopo il Big Bang" (Live)	2012	Italia Loves Emilia – Il concerto
"Amico" (Live, Jovanotti with Renato Zero)	2012	Italia Loves Emilia – Il concerto
"Quando verrà" (Nicola Piovani featuring Jovanotti)	2013	Piovani cantabile
"Fratello" (Clementino featuring Jovanotti)	2013	Mea culpa
"Tieni il tempo 2013" (Max Pezzali featuring Jovanotti)	2013	Max 20
"Ci vuole un fisico bestiale" (Luca Carboni featuring Jovanotti)	2013	Fisico & politico
"A te" (Deejay All Stars featuring Jovanotti)	2014	Natale a casa Deejay
"Baffo Natale" (Elio e le Storie Tese featuring Jovanotti)	2014	Natale a casa Deejay
"Il gigante e la bambina" (Ron featuring Jovanotti)	2016	La forza di dire sì
"Il mondo 2016" (Alborosie featuring Jovanotti)	2016	The Rockers
"Voleva un'anima" (Samuel featuring Jovanotti)	2017	Il codice della bellezza
"Canzone" (Rkomi featuring Jovanotti)	2019	Dove gli occhi non-arrivano

== Music videos ==
List of music videos, showing year released and director
Title	Year	Director(s)
"Gimme Five"	1988	—N/a
"Go Jovanotti Go"	1988	—N/a
"Gimme Five 2"	1988	—N/a
"La mia moto"	1989	—N/a
"Muoviti muoviti"	1991	—N/a
"Non m'annoio"	1992	—N/a
"Ragazzo fortunato"	1992	Ambrogio Lo Giudice
"Penso positivo"	1994	Ambrogio Lo Giudice
"Serenata rap"	1994	Ambrogio Lo Giudice
"Piove"	1994	Sergio Pappalettera
"L'ombelico del mondo"	1995	Ambrogio Lo Giudice
"Bella"	1997	Ambrogio Lo Giudice
"Questa è la mia casa"	1997	Ambrogio Lo Giudice
"Per la vita che verrà"	1997	Eros Puglielli
"Per te"	1999	Sergio Pappalettera
"Un raggio di sole"	1999	Ambrogio Lo Giudice
"Stella cometa" (Version 1)	1999	Ambrogio Lo Giudice
"Dolce fare niente"	1999	Sergio Pappalettera
"Il mio nome è mai più"	1999	Gabriele Salvatores
"Stella cometa" (Version 2)	2000	Marco Manetti, Antonio Manetti
"File Not Found"	2000	Sergio Pappalettera
"Salvami"	2002	Sergio Pappalettera
"Ti sposerò"	2002	François Nemeta
"Morirò d'amore"	2002	Sergio Pappalettera
"A vida"	2003	Sergio Pappalettera
"Do'd freak"	2003	Sergio Pappalettera
"(Tanto)³"	2005	Ambrogio Lo Giudice
"Mi fido di te"	2005	Ambrogio Lo Giudice
"Una storia d'amore"	2006	Jovanotti, Francesca Valiani, Davide Mauti
"Falla girare"	2006	Ambrogio Lo Giudice
"Cade la pioggia"	2008	Dario Baldi, Davide Marengo
"Fango" (Version 1)	2008	Ambrogio Lo Giudice
"Fango" (Version 2)	2008	Ambrogio Lo Giudice
"A te"	2008	Maki Gherzi
"Safari"	2008	Ambrogio Lo Giudice
"Come musica"	2008	Maki Gherzi
"Domani 21/04.09"	2009	Ambrogio Lo Giudice
"Mezzogiorno" (Version 1)	2009	Maki Gherzi
"Mezzogiorno" (Version 2)	2009	Maki Gherzi
"Mezzogiorno" (Version 3)	2009	Maki Gherzi
"Mezzogiorno" (Version 4)	2009	Maki Gherzi
"Mezzogiorno" (Version 5)	2009	Fan video
"Punto"	2009	Marco Ponti
"Baciami ancora"	2010	Gabriele Muccino
"Mondo"	2010	Luca Mariani
"Tutto l'amore che ho"	2010	Maki Gherzi
"Le tasche piene di sassi"	2011	Maki Gherzi
"Il più grande spettacolo dopo il Big Bang"	2011	Leandro Manuel Emede
"The Sound of Sunshine"	2011	—N/a
"La notte dei desideri"	2011	Jovanotti, Leandro Manuel Emede
"Ora"	2011	Michele Lugaresi
"Tensione evolutiva"	2012	Gabriele Muccino
"Ti porto via con me"	2013	Leandro Manuel Emede, Nick Cerioni
"Estate"	2013	Leandro Manuel Emede
"Sabato"	2014	Niccolò Celaia, Antonio Usbergo, Salmo
"Gli immortali"	2015	Lorenzo Fonda
"L'estate addosso"	2015	Gabriele Muccino
"Pieno di vita"	2015	Antonio Usbergo, Niccolò Celaia (YouNuts)
"E non hai visto ancora niente"	2016	Antonio Usbergo, Niccolò Celaia (YouNuts)
"In questa grande città (la prima cumbia)"	2016	Stefano Poletti
"Ragazza magica"	2016	Leandro Manuel Emede, Nick Cerioni
"Oh, vita!"	2017	Antonio Usbergo, Niccolò Celaia (YouNuts)
"Le canzoni"	2018	Antonio Usbergo, Niccolò Celaia (YouNuts)

== Writing credits ==
List of songs written for other artists
Song	Year	Artist(s)	Album
"Libero di cambiare" (Written by Jovanotti, Luca Carboni, Gaetano Curreri & Saverio Grandi)	1992	Stadio	Stabiliamo un contatto
"T.V.B." (Written by Jovanotti & Lorenzo Ternelli)	1994	Irene Grandi	Irene Grandi
"200 milioni di posti" (Written by Jovanotti)	1994	Andrea Mingardi	Amare, amare
"Alleluja" (Written by Zucchero Fornaciari and Jovanotti)	1995	Zucchero	Spirito DiVino
"Dipende" (Written by Pau Donés and Jovanotti)	2000	Jarabe de Palo	Depende (Italian Edition)
"Completo incompleto"	2001	Jarabe de Palo	De vuelta y vuelta (Italian Edition)
"Se tu non sei con me" (Written by Jovanotti)	2002	Syria	Le mie favole
"L'amore è" (Written by Jovanotti)	2003	Syria	Le mie favole (2003 Edition)
"Corazon" (Written by Pau Donés and Jovanotti)	2003	Jarabe de Palo	Bonito
"Aria... non sei più tu" (Written by Jovanotti and Danijel Vuletic)	2007	Adriano Celentano	Dormi amore, la situazione non è buona
"Io cosa sarò" (Written by Jovanotti)	2008	Fiorella Mannoia	Il movimento del dare
"Più sole" (Written by Jovanotti and Stefano di Battista)	2009	Nicky Nicolai and Stefano di Battista	Più sole
"Per te" (Written by Miguel Bosé, Nicolás Sorín and Jovanotti)	2010	Miguel Bosé	Cardio (Italian Edition)
"Bonjour bahia" (Written by Rosario Paci and Jovanotti)	2010	Roy Paci & Aretuska	Latinista
"Tu mi porti su" (Written by Jovanotti and Riccardo Onori)	2011	Giorgia	Dietro le apparenze
"Innamorata" (Written by Jovanotti, Riccardo Onori and Christian Rigano)	2015	Laura Pausini	Simili
"Più di tutto" (Written by Jovanotti, Samuel Umberto Romano and Michele Canova)	2017	Samuel	Il codice della bellezza
"La statua della mia libertà" (Written by Jovanotti, Samuel Umberto Romano and Michele Canova)	2017	Samuel	Il codice della bellezza
"Niente di particolare" (Written by Jovanotti, Samuel Umberto Romano and Michele Canova)	2017	Samuel	Il codice della bellezza

== Notes ==
- A "Mi fido di te" was only released as a digital single. Since the Italian Singles Chart was only based on physical sales until 1 January 2008, the song was not allowed to chart. However, in May 2006, it reached number 40 on the Italian FIMI Top Digital Download, which was established in March 2006.
- B "Falla girare" was only released as a digital single. Since the Italian Singles Chart was only based on physical sales until 1 January 2008, the song was not allowed to chart. However, it reached number 25 on the Italian FIMI Top Digital Download in June 2006.
- C "J'ai confiance en toi (Mi fido di te)" did not enter the Ultratop 50, but peaked at number 12 on the Wallonia Ultratip chart, which acts as a 30-song extension to the Ultratop 40.
- D "Dove ho visto te" did not enter the Italian Singles Chart, but peaked at number 41 on the Italian FIMI Top Digital Download.
