= Pau Donés =

Spanish songwriter, guitarist, and vocalist (1966–2020)

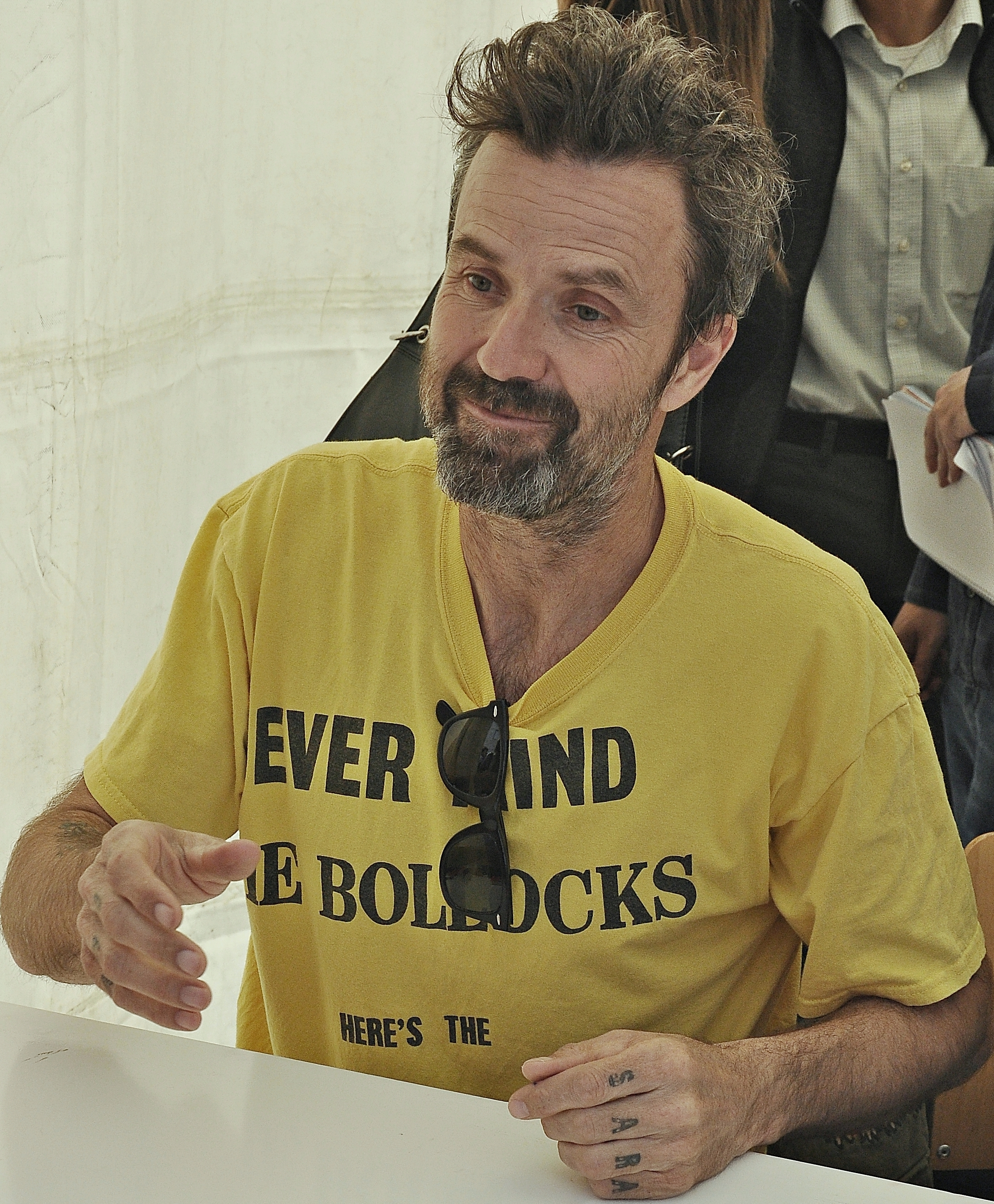
- Pau Donés in 2017

Background information
- Born: Pau Donés Cirera; 11 October 1966; Montanuy, Aragon, Spain
- Died: 9 June 2020 (aged 53) Naut Aran, Catalonia, Spain
- Genres: Rock, pop-rock, flamenco rock
- Years active: 1981–2020

Pau Donés Cirera (11 October 1966 – 9 June 2020) was a Spanish songwriter, guitarist, and vocalist of the Barcelona-based band Jarabe de Palo (also named "Jarabedepalo").

== Biography ==
Donés grew up in Barcelona. He got his first guitar when he was 12 years old. Alongside his brother Marc, Pau Donés set up his first band: J. & Co. Band, and later on: Dentaduras Postizas. Donés split his schedule between performing concerts locally, working as an advertising agent, and studying economics.

In 1996, Donés formed Jarabe de Palo. Their debut album, La Flaca, became a commercial success in Spain after being featured in a TV advertisement. In 2008, he founded his own record company, Tronco Records.

In 2017, he published the book and double disc 50 palos coinciding with his 50th birthday. The album's release was accompanied by a tour of Spain and the United States. In 2018, he released a live album with the Costa Rican Philharmonic Orchestra, entitled Jarabe Filarmónico. In May 2020, his band released a new album titled Tragas o escupes. It was initially set for release in September 2020.

== Personal life and health ==
Donés had a daughter named Sara, but was absent for much of her childhood because of his touring commitments.

On 1 September 2015, Donés cancelled all upcoming concerts following an operation for his colorectal cancer.

On 5 April 2016, Donés announced on Twitter that he had recovered from his illness. However, he had a relapse a year later. He died from cancer on 9 June 2020, aged 53.

== Discography ==
- 1996 - La flaca
- 1998 - Depende
- 2001 - De vuelta y vuelta
- 2003 - Bonito
- 2004 - 1 m^{2}
- 2007 - Adelantando
- 2009 - Orquesta reciclando
- 2011 - ¿Y ahora qué hacemos?
- 2012 - Como un Pintor
- 2014 - Somos
- 2015 - Tour Americano 14-15 (CD/DVD)
- 2018 - Jarabe Filarmónico
- 2020 - Tragas o Escupes

=== Compilations ===
- 2003 - ¿Grandes éxitos?
- 2004 - Colección "Grandes"
- 2005 - Completo, incompleto
- 2006 - Edición 10º aniversario "La Flaca"
