= A te (disambiguation) =

A te may refer to:

- A te, 2013 album by Fiorella Mannoia
- "A Te", 1961 song by Anna Maria (singer)
- "A Te", 1972 song by Iva Zanicchi
- "A te", 2008 Jovanotti song
- "A Te", 1968 song by Jimmy Fontana
- "A Te", 1979s ong by Roberto Vecchioni
