= Una storia d'amore =

Una storia d'amore may refer to:

- Una storia d'amore, also known as Love Story, a 1942 Italian film
- Una storia d'amore (1969 film), a 1969 Italian film by Michele Lupo
- Una storia d'amore, a 1975 album by it:Juli & Julie
- "Una storia d'amore", a song by Jovanotti from the 2006 album Buon Sangue
