= Lorenzo Live – Autobiografia di una festa =

Live album by Jovanotti
- Released: 14 November 2000
- Recorded: November–December 1999
- Length: 144:44
- Label: Soleluna
- Producers: Jovanotti, Michele Centonze

Jovanotti chronology
Lorenzo 1999 - Capo Horn (1999)	Lorenzo Live – Autobiografia di una festa (2000)	Pasaporte - Lo mejor de (2001)

Professional ratings
Review scores
Source	Rating
All Music Guide	2/5 stars

Lorenzo Live – Autobiografia di una festa is the first live album by the Italian singer-songwriter Jovanotti, released by Soleluna on 14 November 2000.

== Track listing ==
CD 1
No.	Title	Writer(s)	Length
1.	"Ahahahahahah-uuh-uh"	Jovanotti	0:22
2.	"Un raggio di sole"	Jovanotti	4:54
3.	"Dal basso" (feat. Michael Franti)	Jovanotti	6:39
4.	"Non c'è libertà"	Jovanotti	3:42
5.	"Questa è la mia casa"	Jovanotti	5:12
6.	"Grazie"	Jovanotti	1:04
7.	"Penso positivo"	Jovanotti	6:53
8.	"La vita nell'era spaziale"	Jovanotti	6:25
9.	"Dolce fare niente"	Jovanotti	4:38
10.	"Serenata Rap"	Jovanotti	6:28
11.	"Stella cometa"	Jovanotti	4:04
12.	"La linea d'ombra (intro)"	Jovanotti	1:57
13.	"Il mio nome è mai più"	Jovanotti	5:12
14.	"Funky Beat-o"	Jovanotti	4:52
15.	"Rappers' Delight"	Jovanotti	3:23
16.	"Non m'annoio"	Jovanotti	2:45

CD 2
No.	Title	Writer(s)	Length
1.	"Una tribù che balla"	Jovanotti	3:42
2.	"Muoviti muoviti"	Jovanotti	4:38
3.	"L'albero (la band)"	Jovanotti	9:02
4.	"La mia moto"	Jovanotti	3:26
5.	"Per te"	Jovanotti	5:10
6.	"Piove"	Jovanotti	4:18
7.	"Bella"	Jovanotti	5:06
8.	"Un giorno di sole"	Jovanotti	5:17
9.	"Il resto va da sé"	Jovanotti	6:08
10.	"L'ombelico del mondo"	Jovanotti	9:12
11.	"Gente della notte"	Jovanotti	4:52
12.	"Ciao mamma"	Jovanotti	3:52
13.	"Ragazzo fortunato"	Jovanotti	6:17
14.	"File not found"	Jovanotti	5:31

== Charts ==
Chart (2000)	Peak position
Italian Albums Chart	6
Swiss Albums Chart	71
