= I Love You Baby =

I Love You Baby may refer to:

Film and TV:

- I Love You, Baby (2000 film), German action thriller film
- I Love You Baby (2001 film), Spanish romantic comedy film
- "I Love You Baby" (Girls), 2016 television episode

Songs:

- "I Luv U Baby", 1994 song by The Original
- "I Love You, Baby", a song by Puff Daddy and Black Rob from the 1997 album No Way Out
- "ILY (I Love You Baby)", 2019 song by Surf Mesa
- "I Love You Baby" (Jovanotti and Sixpm song), 2022

== See also ==
- Baby I Love You (disambiguation)
- Love You to Love You Baby (disambiguation)
- "I'd Like to Love You Baby", single by J.J. Cale from the album Okie
- "I love you baby", part of the chorus of "Can't Take My Eyes Off You"
