= Jarabe de Palo =

Spanish rock band

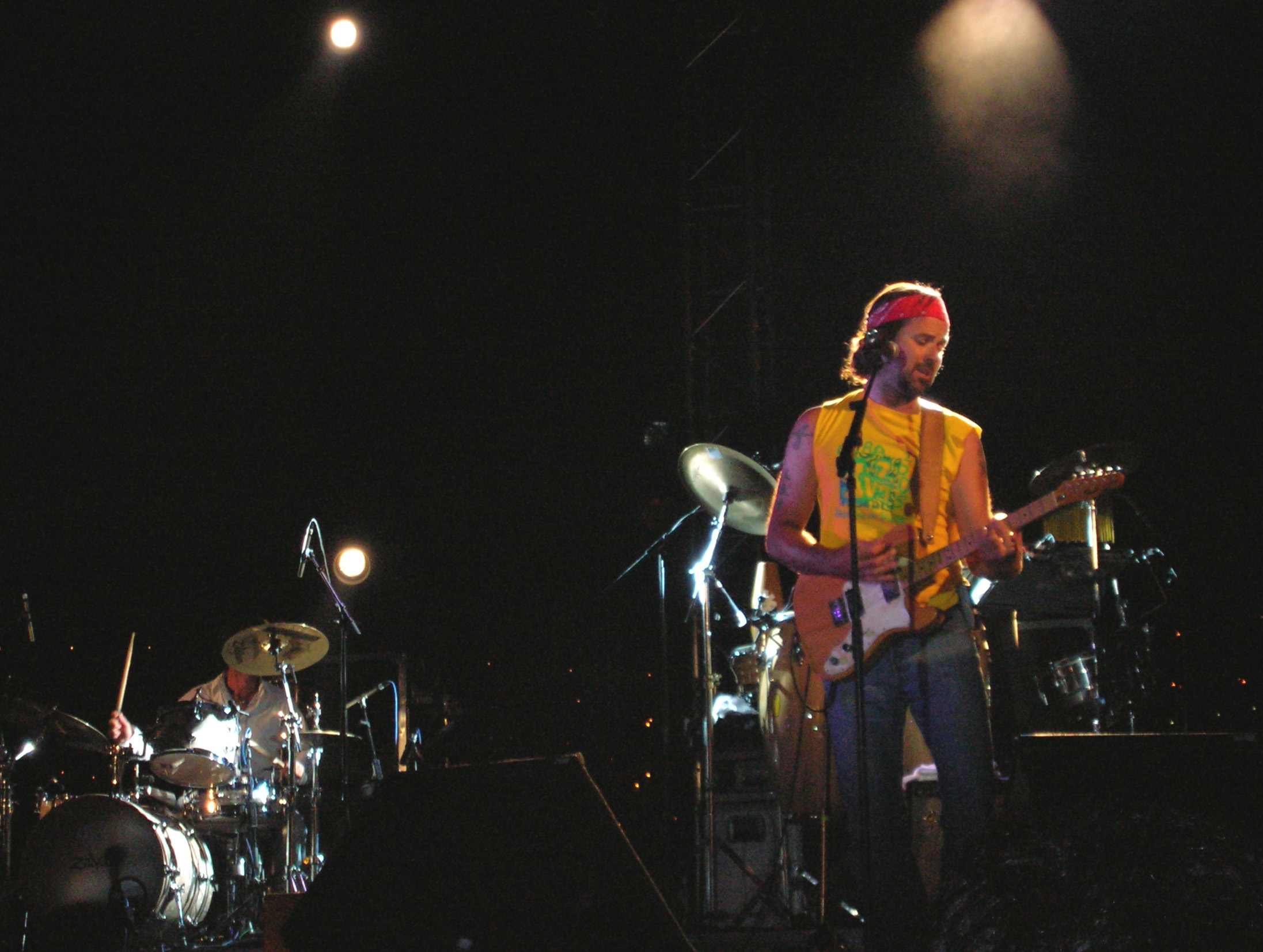
- Jarabe de Palo in concert in 2005

Background information
- Origin: Montanuy, Spain
- Genre: Spanish rock
- Years active: 1996-2020
- Labels: Virgin, Tronco
- Past members: Pau Donés; David Muñoz; Alex Tenas; Jordi Vericat; Jaime Burgos; Jimmy Jenks Jimenez
- Website: JarabeDePalo.com

Jarabe de Palo (literally "Wooden Stick Syrup" or, by virtue of the Spanish expression "dar un jarabe de palo", i.e. a "hell of a beating") was a Spanish rock band founded in 1996. The group was led by singer, songwriter and guitarist Pau Donés, whose death in 2020 caused the band to break up.

== History ==
=== Foundation and beginnings ===
The band was founded in 1996 in Barcelona, Spain, and has always had singer-songwriter Pau Donés as vocalist and lead guitarist.

=== Going independent ===
In 2008, the band announced they were going to leave their record company and go independent, founding their own record label Tronco Records. They changed their name to "Jarabedepalo" because their former record label had the rights to the name.

In 2009 they released, Orquesta Reciclando (Recycling Orchestra), in which they recorded new versions of their old songs, and one new song. ¿Y Ahora que Hacemos? (Now What Are We Going to Do?), was released in 2011 and Somos (We Are) in 2014.

=== Dissolution ===
On 9 June 2020, Donés died near Barcelona after a five-year period of colon cancer, causing the band to split up shortly after.

== Awards and collaborations ==
The group has received Premios de la Música, Premio Ondas, and Grammy nominations. They have collaborated with La Vieja Trova Santiaguera, Antonio Vega, Vico C, and Celia Cruz (for the soundtrack of El milagro de P. Tinto). Donés has also composed tracks for Ricky Martin and starred in a music video with Alanis Morissette. They also collaborated with Italian musicians Jovanotti, Niccolò Fabi, Modà and Ermal Meta.

== Discography ==
- 1996 - La Flaca
- 1998 - Depende
- 2001 - De Vuelta y Vuelta
- 2003 - Bonito
- 2004 - 1m² (Un Metro Cuadrado)
- 2005 - Samba Pa' Ti - Un Tributo a Brasil
- 2007 - Adelantando
- 2009 - Orquesta Reciclando
- 2011 - ¿Y ahora que hacemos?
- 2014 - Somos
- 2015 - TOUR AMERICANO
- 2017 - 50 PALOS
- 2020 - TRAGAS O ESCUPES

== Band members ==
=== Current ===
- David Muñoz - guitar
- Jordi Vericat - bass, background vocals
- Alex Tenas - drums
- Jaime Burgos - keyboards, piano
- Jimmy Jenks Jimenez - sax

=== Former ===
- Pau Donés - vocals, guitar (died 2020)
- Jordi Mena - guitar
- Dani Forcada - percussion
- Joan Gené - bass
- Marià Roch - bass
- Toni-Chupi Saigi - keyboards
- Quino Béjar - percussion
- Toni Saigi - keyboards
- Kyke Serrano - keyboards
- Dani Baraldes - guitar
- Jordi Busquets - guitar
- Carmen Niño - bass
- Riki Frouchtman - guitar
