= Oh, vita! =

Single by Jovanotti

from the album Oh, vita!
- Released: November 10, 2017
- Studio: Villa Le Rose (Florence)
- Genre: Pop rap
- Length: 3:34
- Label: Universal
- Songwriters: Lorenzo Cherubini; Lucio Dalla; Patrick Simmons
- Producer: Rick Rubin

Jovanotti singles chronology
"Ragazza magica" (2016)	"Oh, vita!" (2017)	"Le canzoni" (2018)

Music video
- "Oh, vita!" on YouTube

"Oh, vita!" (transl. "oh, life!"]) is a song by Italian singer-songwriter Jovanotti. It was released on 10 November 2017 through Universal Music Italy as the lead single from his fourteen studio album Oh, vita!.

== Composition ==
The song was written by Jovanotti and produced by Rick Rubin. It sempled two Italian songs: "Futura" by Lucio Dalla and "Ho visto un re" by Dario Fo, Paolo Ciarchi and Enzo Jannacci. Jovanotti stated the meaning of the song:

"I thought right away that "Oh, Vita!" would be the first single from this album. I never gave any of the other songs a chance to be the track that would anticipate the album, and when we were in the studio with Rick Rubin we shared the same thought: "Oh, Vita!" would be the opening track of the album, also because it is the perfect meeting point of mine with this great producer who has been so important in my life before I could even think of one day making a whole record with him."

== Critic reception ==
Rockol define the song as a "hypnotic nursery rhyme" with a "rhythm section in the foreground on the one hand and the acoustic guitar on the other, to complement and act as counterpoint", founding that it "sounds recognizable, yet different, and succeeds in its intent to unite different worlds: the Italian and the Anglo-Saxon worlds". Gabriele Antonucci of Panorama wrote that Jovanotti "returned to his beloved rap, albeit in an unprecedented key", finding that Rubin's production "can be heard in the cleanliness of the sounds and the few instruments".

== Music video ==
The music video for the song, directed by YouNuts! was released on November 10, 2017, through the singer's YouTube channel. The video was filmed in the artist's childhood neighborhood of Porta Cavalleggeri and native home in Rome and Vatican City. Jovanotti explained the decision and the making of the video with the directors:

"With YouNuts we come from similar backgrounds, even similar families, and even though there are 20 years between us, it was hip hop that was our great love. That's why I proposed a simple, real video where they could also fully express themselves and that would represent without tricks my story, which is also theirs and that of a lot of other people. I wanted this song to be told by a video that would connect me with something of my own, that would be a personal thing of mine, a "my little film." That's why I thought about my life, my origins. And for that I chose Rome, where I lived for my first 20 years. [...] There is no nostalgia in the video, but there is a lot of love and gratitude for a history, a place, and the people who connect me to that place. We shot right in my neighborhood and I wanted the deep truth of this song to be heard because throughout this new work and maybe for the first time completely without anything else."

== Charts ==
Chart (2017–2018)	Peak position
Italy (FIMI)	7
Italy Airplay (EarOne)	1

== Certifications ==
Certifications for "Oh, vita!"
Region	Certification	Certified units/sales
Italy (FIMI)	Platinum	50,000^{‡}
^{‡} Sales+streaming figures based on certification alone.
