= L'estate addosso (song) =

Single by Jovanotti

from the album Lorenzo 2015 CC.
- Released: May 29, 2015
- Studio: Electric Lady Studios (New York City)
- Genre: Electropop; Europop
- Length: 3:54
- Label: Universal
- Songwriters: Lorenzo Cherubini; Vasco Brondi; Riccardo Onori; Christian Rigano
- Producers: Michele Canova; Jovanotti

Jovanotti singles chronology
"Ci vuole un fisico bestiale" (2014)	"L'estate addosso" (2015)	"Gli immortali" (2015)

"L'estate addosso" (transl. "Summer on me") is a song by Italian singer-songwriter Jovanotti. It was released on 29 May 2015 through Universal Music Italy as the third single from his thirteen studio album Lorenzo 2015 CC..

The song was also featured as the original song for the 2016 film Summertime directed by Gabriele Muccino. It was nominated at the David di Donatello for Best Original Song.

== Composition ==
The song was written by Jovabotti himself with Vasco Brondi, Riccardo Onori and Christian Rigato, with the music production of Michele Canova. The song was produced as the original song for 2016 film Summertime directed by Gabriele Muccino, becoming the second collaboration since "Baciami ancora", original song of Kiss Me Again In an interview with Variety, Jovanotti explained the meaning of the song and the relationship with Muccino:

"A few years ago, Gabriele [Muccino] called me and told me he had written this screenplay for a small movie he wanted to make to get away from all the stress he was going through in Hollywood. He just told me the title: L’estate addosso. I am always searching for strong evocative images and titles. [...] Then I saw the film, Gabriele had put some boilerplate music with the images, which was quite predictable. Songs that he liked; the usual major chords that become minor ones; some strings; some layers of orchestral music. I told him: “I don’t like this stuff so much. I’d like to do something more indie. I’d like the music in the soundtrack to be the music that’s in these kids’ heads.' [...] We did the whole soundtrack in less than a week. I called some trusted musicians whom I often work with [Christian Noochie Rigano and Riccardo Onori]. We holed up in this studio in New York City, and we did everything in five days. That's how I wanted to do it, sort of stream of consciousness.

== Music video ==
The music video for the song, directed by Gabriele Muccino was released on June 17, 2015, through the singer's YouTube channel. It was filmed in the Fregenae beach, the same set of the film.

== Charts ==
=== Weekly charts ===
Weekly chart performance for "L'estate addosso"
Chart (2015)	Peak position
Italy (FIMI)	8
Italy (Airplay)	1

=== Year-end charts ===
Chart (2015)	Peak position
Italy (FIMI)	39

== Certifications ==
Certifications for "L'estate addosso"
Region	Certification	Certified units/sales
Italy (FIMI)	3× Platinum	150,000^{‡}
^{‡} Sales+streaming figures based on certification alone.
