= Lorenzo 2015 CC. =

Studio album by Jovanotti
- Released: 25 February 2015
- Genre: Pop rap; Dance-pop; World music; Afrobeat
- Length: 75:14 (CD1); 55:24 (CD2)
- Label: Universal
- Producer: Michele Canova; Jovanotti

Jovanotti chronology
| Lorenzo negli stati - Backup Tour 2013 (2013) | Lorenzo 2015 CC. (2015) | L'estate addosso (2016) |

Singles from Lorenzo 2015 CC.
- 1. "Sabato" Released: 16 December 2014; 2. "Gli immortali" Released: 27 February 2015; 3. "L'estate addosso" Released: 29 May 2015; 4. "Pieno di vita" Released: 18 September 2015; 5. "E non hai visto ancora niente" Released: 11 March 2016; 6. "Ragazza magica" Released: 27 May 2016

Lorenzo 2015 CC. is the thirteenth studio album by Italian singer-songwriter Jovanotti, released by Universal Music on 24 February 2015.

The album peaked at number one on the Italian Albums Chart, becoming the best-selling album in Italy in 2015. It was promoted by several successful singles, including "Sabato" and "L'estate addosso", which was also featured as the original song for the 2016 film Summertime directed by Gabriele Muccino.

== Composition ==
The project is a double album that consists of thirty songs, all produced by Jovanotti and Michele Canova. It featured several music generes, including pop rap, funk, afrobeat, world music and dance-pop. The album featured several songwriters and international collaborations, including Stephan Moccio, Manu Dibango, Antibalas, Sinkane and Bombino. In an interview with La Repubblica Jovanotti explained the meaning of the album and its conception:

"I didn't want to make the most innovative record in the world but the one where there was also a song with horns, and with the band playing live, and with real drummers. I wanted to go back, also, to the sound of the band playing in the studio. [...] While making the album, I got exactly the urge to exaggerate. Maybe also because everything has been exaggerated in my life lately, the pains as well as the pleasures. [...] I also realized that, for the first time, in this record I was not claiming to have total control over the effect my songs could have. I've always had a manic fixation on mastery of the material, instead here I let it flow. It doesn't mean that I am not, so to speak, the director of it, but I did everything with more freedom. I was interested in being modern, even more than being appreciated. If I had to choose between being considered an innovator and being number one, well I would choose the former. Yet there are also songs on this record that have an almost traditional sound."

== Critic reception ==
Lorenzo 2015 CC. received generally favorable reviews from Italian music critics, although they criticized its overlength.

Professional ratings
Review scores
| Source | Rating |
|---|---|
| Rockol | 9/10 |
| Rolling Stone Italy | 4/5 stars |

Gianni Sibilla of Rockol defined the album "a distillate of pop" with influences from different music generes. The journalist pointed out that "it entertains and makes you think at the same time" because Jovanotti "tells from an outside point of view, as an observer, than about speaking in the first person".

== Track listing ==
CD 1
| No. | Title | Writer(s) | Producers | Length |
|---|---|---|---|---|
| 1. | "L'alba" | Lorenzo Cherubini; Riccardo Onori | Michele Canova; Jovanotti | 4:29 |
| 2. | "Sabato" | Cherubini; Onori; Saturnino Celani; Christian Rigano | Canova; Jovanotti | 4:06 |
| 3. | "Tutto acceso" | Cherubini | Canova; Jovanotti | 4:30 |
| 4. | "Musica" (feat. Manu Dibango) | Cherubini; Onori; Celani; Christian Rigano | Canova; Jovanotti | 4:34 |
| 5. | "Le storie vere" | Cherubini; Franco Santarnecchi | Canova; Jovanotti | 4:15 |
| 6. | "Ragazza magica" | Cherubini | Canova; Jovanotti | 3:49 |
| 7. | "L'estate addosso" | Cherubini; Onori; Rigano; Vasco Brondi | Canova; Jovanotti | 3:51 |
| 8. | "Gli immortali" | Cherubini; Onori; Celani | Canova; Jovanotti | 3:51 |
| 9. | "Pieno di vita" | Cherubini | Canova; Jovanotti | 4:09 |
| 10. | "Il mondo è tuo (Stasera)" | Cherubini; Onori; Celani | Canova | 5:03 |
| 11. | "È la scienza, bellezza!" | Cherubini; Sheppard Solomon | Canova; Jovanotti | 3:24 |
| 12. | "L'astronauta" | Cherubini; Stephan Moccio | Canova | 4:19 |
| 13. | "Libera" | Cherubini; Martin Perna | Canova | 3:46 |
| 14. | "Il cielo immenso" | Cherubini; Solomon | Canova; Jovanotti | 4:03 |
| 15. | "Caravan Story" | Cherubini | Canova; Jovanotti | 3:48 |
| 16. | "Con uno sguardo" | Cherubini; Onori; Celani | Canova | 4:21 |
| 17. | "Perché tu ci sei" | Cherubini; Onori; Santarnecchi | Canova | 4:00 |
| 18. | "Insieme" | Cherubini | Canova; Jovanotti | 4:53 |
| Total length: | | | | 75:14 |

CD 2
| No. | Title | Writer(s) | Producers | Length |
|---|---|---|---|---|
| 1. | "Melagioco" (feat. Antibalas) | Cherubini; Martin Perna | Canova; Jovanotti | 5:58 |
| 2. | "Il vento degli innamorati" | Cherubini; Onori; Rigano | Canova; Jovanotti | 4:19 |
| 3. | "Un bene dell'anima" | Cherubini; Onori; Celani | Canova; Jovanotti | 4:00 |
| 4. | "Si alza il vento" (feat. Bombino) | Cherubini; Magali Berardo | Canova; Jovanotti | 4:24 |
| 5. | "Una scintilla" | Cherubini; Canova; Sergio Vallarino | Canova | 3:53 |
| 6. | "E non-hai visto ancora niente" | Cherubini; Canova | Canova | 4:59 |
| 7. | "La bohème" | Cherubini; Onori; Celani; Rigano | Canova | 4:00 |
| 8. | "All the People" (feat. Sinkane) | Cherubini; Canova; Ahmed Abdullahi Gallab | Canova; Jovanotti | 5:08 |
| 9. | "Fondamentale" | Cherubini | Canova | 5:13 |
| 10. | "Il riparo" | Cherubini | Canova | 3:47 |
| 11. | "Gravity" | Cherubini; Canova; Leonardo Beccafichi | Canova | 4:58 |
| 12. | "7 miliardi" | Cherubini; Solomon | Canova | 3:45 |
| Total length: | | | | 55:24 |

== Musicians ==
- Jovanotti – vocals, guitar
- Saturnino – bass, drums
- Riccardo Onori – guitar
- Frank Santarnecchi – piano, keyboards
- Christian "Noochie" Rigano – keyboards, programming, synth, sequencer
- Michele Canova Iorfida – keyboards, synth
- Alex Alessandroni Jr. – keyboards, piano, Hammond organ, Fender Rhodes
- Roberto Baldi – keyboards
- Money Mark – keyboards
- Daru Jones – drums
- Omar Hakim – drums
- Mark Guiliana – drums
- Solomon Sheppard – guitar
- Tim Pierce – guitar
- Tim Lefebvre – bass
- Manu Dibango – sax, marimba
- Antibalas – instruments
- Bombino – guitar
- Sinkane – guitar
- Tamer Pinarbasi – qanun
- Max ZT – dulcimer
- Gilmar Gomes – percussions
- Gil Oliveira – percussions
- Ronaldo Andrade – percussions, cavaquinho
- Marco Tamburini – trumpet
- Dario Cecchini – sax, flute
- Roberto Rossi – trombone

== Charts and certifications ==
=== Weekly charts ===
| Chart (2015) | Peak position |
|---|---|
| Belgian Albums (Ultratop Wallonia) | 62 |
| Greek Albums (IFPI) | 54 |
| Italian Albums (FIMI) | 1 |
| Swiss Albums (Schweizer Hitparade) | 3 |
| US World Albums (Billboard) | 13 |

=== Year-end charts ===
| Chart (2015) | Position |
|---|---|
| Italian Albums (FIMI) | 1 |
| Swiss Albums (Schweizer Hitparade) | 91 |

== Certifications ==
| Region | Certification | Certified units/sales |
|---|---|---|
| Italy (FIMI) | 6× Platinum | 300,000^{‡} |
^{‡} Sales+streaming figures based on certification alone.

== See also ==
- List of best-selling albums by year (Italy)
