= Lorenzo 1990–1995 =

Compilation album by Jovanotti
- Released: October 1995
- Length: 72:00
- Label: Mercury
- Producer: Jovanotti, Michele Centonze

Jovanotti chronology
Lorenzo 1994 (1994)	Lorenzo 1990–1995 (1995)	Lorenzo 1997 – L'albero (1997)

Professional ratings
Review scores
Source	Rating
AllMusic	4.5/5 stars

Lorenzo 1990–1995 is the second compilation album by Italian singer-songwriter Jovanotti, released by Mercury Records in 1995.

== Track listing ==
No.	Title	Writer(s)	Length
1.	"L'ombelico del mondo"	Jovanotti, Michele Centonze, Saturnino Celani	4:28
2.	"Ragazzo fortunato"	Jovanotti, Centonze	4:49
3.	"Muoviti muoviti"	Jovanotti, Luca Cersosimo	4:24
4.	"Chissà se stai dormendo"	Jovanotti, Massimo Mariello	5:12
5.	"Una tribù che balla"	Jovanotti, Centonze	3:41
6.	"Non m'annoio"	Jovanotti	3:43
7.	"Libera l'anima"	Jovanotti, Centonze, Cersosimo	4:48
8.	"Quando sarai lontana"	Jovanotti	4:14
9.	"Gente della notte"	Jovanotti, Celani	4:27
10.	"Ciao mamma"	Jovanotti, Claudio Cecchetto, Cersosimo	4:37
11.	"Io no"	Jovanotti, Celani, Cersosimo	4:56
12.	"Io ti cercherò"	Jovanotti	4:36
13.	"Serenata Rap"	Jovanotti, Centonze	5:10
14.	"Piove"	Jovanotti, Cersosimo	3:20
15.	"Penso positivo"	Jovanotti, Celani	5:07
16.	"Marco Polo"	Jovanotti, Centonze	4:28

== Charts ==
Chart (1995)	Peak position
Austrian Albums (Ö3 Austria)	8
Italian Albums (FIMI)	1
Swiss Albums (Schweizer Hitparade)	14

== Certifications ==
Region	Certification	Certified units/sales
Austria (IFPI Austria)	Gold	25,000^{*}
Germany	—	70,000
Italy	—	400,000
Italy (FIMI) sales since 2009	Gold	30,000^{*}
Switzerland (IFPI Switzerland)	Gold	25,000^{^}
^{*} Sales figures based on certification alone.^{^} Shipments figures based on certification alone.
