= Fango (song) =

Single by Jovanotti featuring Ben Harper

from the album Safari
- Released: 6 December 2007
- Genre: Pop
- Length: 4:34
- Label: Universal
- Songwriters: Jovanotti; Riccardo Onori; Michael Franti
- Producer: Michele Canova

Jovanotti singles chronology
"Falla girare" (2006)	"Fango" (2007)	"A te" (2008)

Music video
- "Fango" – Version 1 on YouTube

Music video
- "Fango" – Version 2 on YouTube

"Fango" is a song written by Jovanotti, Riccardo Onori and Michael Franti, recorded by Jovanotti himself for his eleventh studio album Safari, and produced by Michele Canova. The song, which features American recording artist Ben Harper playing bass, was released as the album's lead single in December 2007. The song received the first Mogol Award, voted by popular lyricist Mogol with three additional experts and aimed at recognizing the best lyrics of the year in Italian pop music.

== Commercial performance ==
Immediately after its release, the song entered the Italian FIMI Top Digital Downloads chart, debuting at number 4 during the 50th week of 2007. During the second week, the song reached its peak at number three. However, until January 2008, FIMI considered the physical singles chart as the official one in Italy, and "Fango" was released as a digital download only. Starting from January 2008, when the Top Digital Download became the primary singles chart in Italy, the song spent thirteen additional weeks on the chart's top 20, reaching number 4 in the week of 17 January 2008. According to Musica e Dischi, the single sold 55,000 digital copies in Italy in 2008.

"Fango" also became a radio hit, topping the Music Control chart, compiled by Nielsen and ranking the most aired songs in Italian radio stations.

== Charts ==
Chart (2007)	Peak position
Italy (FIMI)	4

== Release history ==
Region	Date	Format
Italy	6 December 2007	Mainstream airplay
Italy	7 December 2007	Digital download
