= Lorenzo 2002 – Il quinto mondo =

Studio album by Jovanotti
- Released: 28 January 2002
- Length: 77:24 CD
- Label: Mercury Records

Jovanotti chronology
Pasaporte (2001)	Lorenzo 2002 – Il quinto mondo (2002)	Jova Live 2002 (2002)

Singles from Lorenzo 2002 – Il quinto mondo
- 1. "Salvami" Released: 2002; 2. "Ti sposerò" Released: 2002; 3. "Morirò d'amore" Released: 2002; 4. "Date al diavolo un bambino per cena" Released: 2002

Lorenzo 2002 – Il quinto mondo is the ninth studio album by Italian singer-songwriter Jovanotti.

As with Jovanotti's previous releases, Il quinto mondo reflects the singer's activism in areas such as politics, globalization, human rights and ecology, as well as his interest in world music, although love songs are also represented. The main single from the album, "Salvami" ("Save Me"), contains a controversial reference to the Italian right-wing war reporter Oriana Fallaci as "the journalist-writer who loves war because it reminds her of the times when she was young and beautiful" and it was mentioned in Tiziano Terzani's anti-war book Lettere contro la guerra.

== Track listing ==
1. "Salvami" – 4:04
2. "Un uomo" – 7:40
3. "Albero di mele" – 4:36
4. "Ti sposerò" – 5:04
5. "Morirò d'amore" – 4:16
6. "La vita vale" – 4:59
7. "Noi" – 3:55
8. "Salato parte uno" – 3:59
9. "Salato parte due" – 5:02
10. "Canzone d'amore esagerata" – 6:49
11. "(Storia di un) Corazon" – 4:38
12. "Il quinto mondo" – 4:32
13. "Date al diavolo un bimbo per cena" – 11:54
14. "30 modi per salvare il mondo" – 4:15

== Personnel ==
- Pier Foschi: drums, backing vocals
- Riccardo Onori: guitar, banjo, mandolin, sitar, backing vocals
- Giovanni Allevi: piano, keyboards, backing vocals
- Ernesttico Rodriguez: percussions, backing vocals
- Saturnino: bass guitar, double bass, backing vocals
- Roberta "Robertina" Magnetti: backing vocals
- Roberta Bacciolo: backing vocals
- Elena Bacciolo: backing vocals

== Charts ==
=== Weekly charts ===
Chart (2002)	Peak position
Austrian Albums (Ö3 Austria)	20
Italian Albums (FIMI)	1
Swiss Albums (Schweizer Hitparade)	11

=== Year-end charts ===
Chart (2002)	Position
Italian Albums (FIMI)	20
