= Baby I Love You (disambiguation) =

"Baby, I Love You" is a song originally recorded in 1963 by the Ronettes.

Baby I Love You may refer to:

- Baby I Love You (album), a 1969 album by Andy Kim
- "Baby I Love You" (Aretha Franklin song), 1967
- "Baby I Love You" (TEE song), 2010
- "Baby I Love U!", a 2004 song recorded by Jennifer Lopez
- "Baby, I Love You", a song written by Jimmy Holiday and recorded in 1970 by Little Milton
- "Baby I Love You (Yes, I Do)", a song by KC and the Sunshine Band from the 1976 album Part 3
- "Baby I Love You", a song by Pentagon from the 2021 EP Love or Take

== See also ==
- "Babe I Love You", a 1992 song by Jandek from Lost Cause
- I Love You Baby (disambiguation)
