= Safari (Jovanotti album) =

Studio album by Jovanotti
- Released: 18 January 2008
- Length: 71:24
- Label: Universal; Soleluna
- Producer: Alessandro Cortini; Michele Canova; Jovanotti

Jovanotti chronology
ElectroJova - Buon sangue dopato (2006)	Safari (2008)	OYEAH (2009)

Singles from Safari
- 1. "Fango" Released: 6 December 2007; 2. "A te" Released: 7 March 2008; 3. "Safari" Released: 4 July 2008; 4. "Come musica" Released: 20 October 2008; 5. "Mezzogiorno" Released: 23 January 2009; 6. "Il 5 Maggio (Napoleone è Pieno di Vita)" Released: 29 March 2009; 7. "Punto" Released: 15 May 2009

Professional ratings
Review scores
Source	Rating
AllMusic	3.5/5 stars
Musica e dischi	5/5 stars

Safari is the eleventh studio album by Italian singer-songwriter Jovanotti. Preceded by the single "Fango", it was released in Italy on 17 January 2008. The album features guests including Ben Harper, who plays a guitar solo in "Fango", Italian band Negramaro's frontman Giuliano Sangiorgi, Brazilian musician Sérgio Mendes and American recording artist Michael Franti.

Safari was a commercial success, topping the Italian Albums Chart for seven weeks and being certified five times platinum by the Federation of the Italian Music Industry. It also became the best-selling album of 2008 in Italy, while its second single, "A te", ranked first in the Italian annual chart.

== Track listing ==
Standard Edition (Mercury UPC 00602517577527)
No.	Title	Length
1.	"Fango" (featuring Ben Harper)	4:34
2.	"Mezzogiorno"	4:22
3.	"A te"	4:25
4.	"Dove ho visto te"	4:30
5.	"In orbita"	4:33
6.	"Safari" (featuring Giuliano Sangiorgi)	4:24
7.	"Temporale" (featuring Sly and Robbie)	5:54
8.	"Come musica"	3:50
9.	"Innamorato"	2:38
10.	"Punto" (featuring Sérgio Mendes)	4:11
11.	"Antidolorificomagnifico"	4:26
12.	"Mani libere 2008" (featuring Michael Franti)	4:25

iTunes Bonus Track
No.	Title	Length
13.	"Punto" (Veccho Frank Version, featuring Sèrgio Mendes)	3:35

Limited Deluxe Edition
No.	Title	Length
13.	"Come parli l'italiano"	3:10
14.	"Nel mio tempo"	5:06
15.	"Il gioco del mondo"	7:29

Limited Christmas Edition
No.	Title	Length
13.	"A te" (Live)	5:34
14.	"Come musica" (Live)	3:53
15.	"Mezzogiorno" (Live)	5:08
16.	"Dove ho visto te" (Live)	4:37

== Charts ==
=== Weekly charts ===
Chart (2008)	Peak position
Austrian Albums (Ö3 Austria)	70
Italian Albums (FIMI)	1
Swiss Albums (Schweizer Hitparade)	4

=== Year-end charts ===
Chart (2008)	Position
European Albums (Billboard)	39
Italian Albums (FIMI)	1
Swiss Albums (Schweizer Hitparade)	55

== Certifications ==
Region	Certification	Certified units/sales
Italy (FIMI)	5× Platinum	600,000
Switzerland (IFPI Switzerland)	Gold	10,000^{^}
^{^} Shipments figures based on certification alone.
