= Sabato (song) =

Single by Jovanotti

from the album Lorenzo 2015 CC.
- Released: December 16, 2014
- Studio: Electric Lady Studios (New York City)
- Genre: Electropop; Europop
- Length: 4:06
- Label: Universal
- Songwriters: Lorenzo Cherubini; Saturnino Celani; Riccardo Onori; Christian Rigano
- Producer: Michele Canova

Jovanotti singles chronology
"Ci vuole un fisico bestiale" (2014)	"Sabato" (2014)	"Gli immortali" (2015)

"Sabato" (transl. "Saturday"]) is a song by Italian singer-songwriter Jovanotti. It was released on 16 December 2014 through Universal Music Italy as the lead single from his thirteen studio album Lorenzo 2015 CC..

== Composition ==
The song was written by Jovabotti himself with Saturinino Celani, Riccardo Onori and Christian Rigato, with the music production of Michele Canova. The song was recorded at the Electric Lady Studios in New York City. Italian newspaper Il Post wrote that the song has several references in the lyrics, including Giacomo Leopardi's poem Il sabato del villaggio, "Heroes" by David Bowie and "Bad" by Michael Jackson.

== Critics reception ==
Rockol wrote that the album is "a pop composed of unconventional elements: it opens with an almost nursery rhyme-like keyboard turn, which immediately sticks in the mind, supported by the rhythmic beat", finding it "danceable and rhythmic but with an underlying tension that is deliberately not fully released".

== Music video ==
The music video for the song, directed by Younuts was released on December 26, 2014, through the singer's YouTube channel. It was filmed in the Novegro's Luna Park, in Milan.

== Charts ==
=== Weekly charts ===
Weekly chart performance for "Sabato"
Chart (2014)	Peak position
Italy (FIMI)	4
Italy Airplay (EarOne)	1

=== Year-end charts ===
Chart (2015)	Peak position
Italy (FIMI)	26

== Certifications ==
Certifications for "Sabato"
Region	Certification	Certified units/sales
Italy (FIMI)	3× Platinum	150,000^{‡}
^{‡} Sales+streaming figures based on certification alone.
