= I Love You Baby (Jovanotti and Sixpm song) =

Single by Jovanotti and Sixpm

from the album Il disco del Sole
- Released: March 21, 2022
- Genre: Dance pop; pop rock *rock and roll
- Length: 3:32
- Label: Universal
- Songwriters: Lorenzo Cherubini; Riccardo Onori; Christian Rigano
- Producer: Sixpm

Jovanotti and Sixpm singles chronology
"A casa tutti bene" (2022)	"I Love You Baby" (2022)	"Sensibile all'estate" (2022)

Music video
- "I love you baby" on YouTube

"I Love You Baby" is a song by Italian singer-songwriter Jovanotti and music producer Sixpm. It was released on 21 March 2022 through Universal Music Italy as the lead vocalist from Jovanotti fifteenth studio album Il disco del Sole.

== Composition ==
The song was written by Jovanotti himself with Riccardo Onori and Christian Rigano, with the music production of Sixpm. It has different music influences, including pop rock, dance-pop, blues and flamenco. In an interview with Rockol Jovanotti explained the meaning of the song:

"After a period of forced detachment from music I woke up with an irresistible desire to make songs, without conforming to what I was hearing around, without thinking about 'featuring' and 'placements.' In a rather wild and instinctive way I wrote pieces without having any strategy in my head, just the desire to share this thing that was boiling inside me."

== Music video ==
The music video for the song, directed by Leandro Emede was released on April 6, 2022, through the singer's YouTube channel.

== Charts ==
=== Weekly charts ===
Chart (2022)	Peak position
Italy (FIMI)	2
Italy Airplay (EarOne)	1

=== Year-end charts ===
Chart (2022)	Position
Italy (FIMI)	14

== Certifications ==
Certifications for "I Love You Baby"
Region	Certification	Certified units/sales
Italy (FIMI)	4× Platinum	400,000^{‡}
^{‡} Sales+streaming figures based on certification alone.
