= La mia moto =

Studio album by Jovanotti
- Released: 1989
- Length: 40:35
- Label: FRI Records
- Producer: Claudio Cecchetto, Jovanotti

Jovanotti chronology
Jovanotti for President (1988)	La mia moto (1989)	Jovanotti Special (1989)

La mia moto is the second studio album by Italian singer-songwriter Jovanotti, released by FRI Records in 1989.

The album reached number four on the FIMI Chart.

== Track listing ==
No.	Title	Writer(s)	Length
1.	"Vai così (Jingle)"	Jovanotti	0:52
2.	"La mia moto"	Jovanotti	4:18
3.	"Bella storia"	Jovanotti	3:35
4.	"Cowboy"	Jovanotti	4:21
5.	"Scappa con me"	Jovanotti	2:56
6.	"Vasco"	Jovanotti	4:13
7.	"Il capo della banda (1a parte)"	Jovanotti	1:14
8.	"Spacchiamoci le orecchie"	Jovanotti	4:16
9.	"Stasera voglio fare una festa"	Jovanotti	3:30
10.	"Ci provo gusto (E il basso pompa)"	Jovanotti	3:47
11.	"Ci si skiaccia"	Jovanotti	3:38
12.	"Il capo della banda"	Jovanotti	3:49

== Charts and certifications ==
=== Charts ===
Chart (1989)	Peak position
Italian Albums Chart	4

=== Year-end charts ===
Chart (1989)	Position
Italian Albums Chart	4

=== Certifications ===
Region	Certification	Certified units/sales
Italy (FIMI)	Diamond	500,000^{*}
^{*} Sales figures based on certification alone.
