= Una tribù che balla =

Studio album by Jovanotti
- Released: 19 April 1991
- Length: 65:05
- Label: FRI Records
- Producer: Claudio Cecchetto, Jovanotti

Jovanotti chronology
Giovani Jovanotti (1990)	Una tribù che balla (1991)	Lorenzo 1992 (1992)

Una tribù che balla is the fourth studio album by Italian singer-songwriter Jovanotti, released by FRI Records on 19 April 1991.

The album reached number eleven on the FIMI Singles Chart.

== Track listing ==
No.	Title	Writer(s)	Length
1.	"Intro"	Jovanotti	1:06
2.	"Muoviti muoviti"	Jovanotti	4:23
3.	"Radio Rap"	Jovanotti	3:01
4.	"Abbasso i lenti"	Jovanotti	3:10
5.	"Libera l'anima"	Jovanotti	4:47
6.	"Buongiorno"	Jovanotti	3:59
7.	"Grinta"	Jovanotti	2:57
8.	"Una tribù che balla"	Jovanotti	3:40
9.	"Cosa dovrei fare"	Jovanotti	3:09
10.	"One Nation"	Jovanotti	6:22
11.	"Geghejazz"	Jovanotti	2:33
12.	"È sempre la stessa canzone che va"	Jovanotti	3:42
13.	"Quando sarai lontana"	Jovanotti	4:14
14.	"La strada"	Jovanotti	3:23

== Musicians ==
- Jovanotti – voce
- Michele Centonze – keyboards, guitar, programming
- Luca Cersosimo – keyboards, programming, electronic drums
- Saturnino – bass
- Giorgio Prezioso – scratch
- Demo Morselli – trumpet
- Giancarlo Porro – sax
- Emanuela Cortesi – backing vocals
- Lalla Francia – backing vocals
- Paola Folli – backing vocals

== Charts and certifications ==
=== Charts ===
Chart (1991)	Peak position
Italian Albums Chart	11

=== Certifications ===
Region	Certification	Certified units/sales
Italy (FIMI)	Gold	50,000^{*}
^{*} Sales figures based on certification alone.
