= Lorenzo 1999 – Capo Horn =

Studio album by Jovanotti
- Released: 10 May 1999
- Length: 65:22
- Label: Mercury Records; Soleluna
- Producer: Jovanotti; Michele Centonze

Jovanotti chronology
Lorenzo 1997 - L'albero (1997)	Lorenzo 1999 – Capo Horn (1999)	Lorenzo Live - Autobiografia di una festa (2000)

Singles from Lorenzo 1999
- 1. "Per te" Released: 22 April 1999; 2. "Un raggio di sole" Released: 30 July 1999

Professional ratings
Review scores
Source	Rating
AllMusic	4.5/5 stars
Corriere della Sera	5/5 stars

Lorenzo 1999 – Capo Horn is the eighth studio album by Italian singer-songwriter Jovanotti, released by Mercury Records on 10 May 1999.

== Track listing ==
No.	Title	Writer(s)	Length
1.	"Per te"	Jovanotti	4:41
2.	"Il resto va da sé"	Jovanotti	5:02
3.	"Dolce far niente"	Jovanotti	3:58
4.	"La vita nell'era spaziale"	Jovanotti	5:24
5.	"Stella cometa"	Jovanotti	3:52
6.	"Un giorno di sole"	Jovanotti	4:47
7.	"Un raggio di sole"	Jovanotti	4:51
8.	"Funky Beat-o"	Jovanotti	4:40
9.	"Capo Horn"	Jovanotti	4:47
10.	"Dal basso"	Jovanotti	6:52
11.	"Non è ancora finita"	Jovanotti	4:40
12.	"Non c'è libertà"	Jovanotti	4:24
13.	"Tutto può succedere"	Jovanotti	4:28
14.	"Buon anno"	Jovanotti	3:00

== Charts ==
Chart (1999)	Peak position
Austrian Albums (Ö3 Austria)	24
Italian Albums (FIMI)	1
Swiss Albums (Schweizer Hitparade)	10

== Certifications ==
Region	Certification	Certified units/sales
Italy (FIMI)	5× Platinum	500,000^{*}
^{*} Sales figures based on certification alone.
