= Anna Maria (singer) =

Italian singer

Anna Maria Ramenghi (born 20 May 1945 in Castel Guelfo, Bologna) is an Italian singer.

== Discography ==
- 1964: Cocktail di canzoni (RCA Italiana PML 10379 - brani "Amado mio" e "No" sul lato A; brani "Ti seguirò" e "Viaggio nell'infinito" sul

Singles

- 1961: Il segreto / A te (RCA Italiana PM45-3045)
- 1962: Non ti credo / La porta del cielo (RCA Italiana PM45-3063)
- 1962: Canadian twist / Frenetico twist (RCA Italiana)
- 1963: Il bene o il male / Acqua passata (RCA Italiana PM45-3178)
- 1964: Il ragazzo del mio palazzo / Non sei più come prima (RCA Italiana PM45-3273)
- 1976: Fernando / Amaro fiore (Las Vegas LVS 1075)
