= De Vuelta y Vuelta =

Studio album by Jarabe de Palo
- Released: 2001
- Genre: Latin, rock
- Label: EMI Music
- Producer: Joe dworniak

Jarabe de Palo chronology
Depende (1998)	''De Vuelta y Vuelta'' (2001)	¿Grandes Éxitos? (2003)

De Vuelta y Vuelta is the third album by Spanish Rock group Jarabe de Palo, released in 2001.

== Track listing ==
1. De Vuelta y Vuelta – 5:44
2. Tiempo (featuring Vico-C & Jovanotti) – 4:43
3. En lo Puro No Hay Futuro – 3:25
4. Dos Días en la Vida – 6:21
5. La Luz de Tu Corazón – 4:18
6. Completo Incompleto – 3:18
7. Cara de Azul – 3:49
8. Agustito Con la Vida – 3:21
9. De los Libros (No Se Aprende) – 3:09
10. Viaje Para Locos – 4:23
11. Mamá – 7:48

== Charts ==
Chart (2001)	Peak position
US Top Latin Albums (Billboard)	46

== Certifications ==
Region	Certification	Certified units/sales
Spain (Promusicae)	2× Platinum	200,000^{^}
^{^} Shipments figures based on certification alone.
