= Jovanotti for President =

Studio album by Jovanotti
- Released: 1988
- Length: 43:41
- Label: FRI Records
- Producer: Claudio Cecchetto; Jovanotti

Jovanotti chronology
Jovanotti for President (1988)	La mia moto (1989)

Jovanotti for President is the first studio album by Italian singer-songwriter Jovanotti, released by FRI Records in 1988.

A remastered edition was released on 26 October 2018, for the album's 30th anniversary.

The album reached number three on the Italian album chart.

== Track listing ==
No.	Title	Writer(s)	Length
1.	"Go Jovanotti Go"	Jovanotti	4:47
2.	"Party President"	Jovanotti	4:11
3.	"Funklab"	Jovanotti	4:32
4.	"Gimme Five"	Jovanotti	3:52
5.	"I Need You"	Jovanotti	3:33
6.	"Jovanotti Sound"	Jovanotti	4:41
7.	"The Rappers"	Jovanotti	5:04
8.	"Ragamuffin"	Jovanotti	4:14
9.	"Mix"	Jovanotti	4:45

== Charts and certifications ==
=== Charts ===
Chart (1988)	Peak position
Italian Albums Chart	3

=== Year-end charts ===
Chart (1988)	Position
Italian Albums Chart	11

=== Certifications ===
Region	Certification	Certified units/sales
Italy (FIMI)	Diamond	500,000^{*}
^{*} Sales figures based on certification alone.
