= Lorenzo 1992 =

Studio album by Jovanotti
- Released: 5 April 1992
- Length: 48:15
- Label: FRI Records
- Producer: Claudio Cecchetto, Jovanotti

Jovanotti chronology
Una tribù che balla (1991)	Lorenzo 1992 (1992)	Lorenzo 1994 (1994)

Lorenzo 1992 is the fifth studio album by Italian singer-songwriter Jovanotti, released by FRI Records on 5 April 1992.

The album reached number four on the FIMI Singles Chart.

== Track listing ==
No.	Title	Writer(s)	Length
1.	"Il Rap"	Jovanotti	3:26
2.	"Non m'annoio"	Jovanotti, Renato Pareti	3:43
3.	"Ragazzo fortunato"	Jovanotti, Michele Centonze, Augusto Martelli	4:50
4.	"Puttane e spose"	Jovanotti	3:59
5.	"Benvenuti nella giungla"	Jovanotti, Saturnino Celani	4:13
6.	"Televisione televisione"	Jovanotti, Luca Cersosimo, Claudio Cecchetto	2:24
7.	"Io no"	Jovanotti, Luca Cersosimo, Augusto Martelli, Saturnino Celani	4:55
8.	"Sai qual è il problema"	Jovanotti	3:17
9.	"Chissà se stai dormendo"	Jovanotti, Massimo Mariello	5:11
10.	"Estate 1992"	Jovanotti, Michele Centonze, Augusto Martelli	4:17
11.	"Vai con un po' di violenza"	Jovanotti	3:25
12.	"Ho perso la direzione"	Jovanotti	4:03

== Charts and certifications ==
=== Charts ===
Chart (1992)	Peak position
Italian Albums Chart	4

=== Certifications ===
Region	Certification	Certified units/sales
Italy (FIMI)	Gold	50,000^{*}
^{*} Sales figures based on certification alone.
