= La Flaca (Jarabe de Palo album) =

Studio album by Jarabe de Palo
- Released: 1996
- Recorded: March 1996 in Barcelona
- Genre: Latin, rock
- Length: 40:23
- Label: EMI Music Spain
- Producer: Joe Dworniak

Jarabe de Palo chronology
| ''La Flaca'' (1996) | Depende (1998) |

Professional ratings
Review scores
| Source | Rating |
|---|---|
| Allmusic | 3/5 stars |

La Flaca is the debut album by the Spanish Latin rock group Jarabe de Palo, released in 1996. The album was produced by Joe Dworniak for Virgin Records España. Immediately after its release, the album obtained a poor commercial reception, selling only 12,000 copies within seven months. However, when the title-track of the album was used as a TV advertisement, the album became a commercial success in Spain, reaching number one on the charts and being certified six times platinum for domestic shipments exceeding 600,000 copies. Released in Europe, Latin America and the United States, it also received gold and platinum status in several other countries, including Italy, where it peaked at number two and was certified triple platinum by the Federation of the Italian Music Industry. The title track ranked number 50 on Music & Media's Border Breakers chart, which measures airplay of songs by European artists in the continent but outside of each artist's country of label signing.

== Track listing ==
All words and lyrics by Jarabe de Palo

| No. | Title | Length |
|---|---|---|
| 1. | "Quiero ser poeta" | 3:32 |
| 2. | "Vuela" | 3:29 |
| 3. | "No suelo compararme" | 3:03 |
| 4. | "La flaca" | 4:29 |
| 5. | "Grita" | 3:35 |
| 6. | "El bosque de palo" | 3:29 |
| 7. | "El lado oscuro" | 4:44 |
| 8. | "Quítame la vida" | 3:16 |
| 9. | "Dueño de mi silencio" | 3:28 |
| 10. | "Desamor" | 3:33 |
| 11. | "La flaca" (Acoustic version) | 3:37 |

== Personnel ==
- Pau Donés – Vocals, Guitar
- Joan Gené – Bass (except in "La Flaca" and "Grita")
- Jordi Mena – Guitar
- Daniel Forcada – Percussion (except in "El lado oscuro")
- Alex Tenas – Drums

Other personnel

- Carlos de France – Bass in "Grita"
- Joe Dworniak – Bass in "La Flaca"
- Antonio Martínez – Spanish guitar
- Nigel Roberts – Keyboards

== Charts and certifications ==
=== Peak positions ===
| Chart (1997–1999) | Peak position |
|---|---|
| French Albums Chart | 36 |
| Italian Albums Chart | 2 |
| Spanish Albums Chart | 1 |
| US Latin Albums | 17 |
| US Latin Pop Albums | 17 |

=== Certifications ===
| Region | Certification | Certified units/sales |
|---|---|---|
| Argentina (CAPIF) | Gold | 30,000^{^} |
| Chile (IFPI Chile) | Gold | 5,000^{x} |
| Italy (FIMI) | 3× Platinum | 300,000^{*} |
| Mexico (AMPROFON) | Gold | 100,000^{^} |
| Spain (PROMUSICAE) | 6× Platinum | 600,000^{^} |
| Uruguay (CUD) | Gold | 2,000^{x} |
Summaries
| Europe (IFPI) | Platinum | 1,000,000^{*} |
^{*} Sales figures based on certification alone.^{^} Shipments figures based on certification alone.
