= Lorenzo 1997 – L'albero =

Studio album by Jovanotti
- Released: 30 January 1997
- Length: 77:39
- Label: Mercury Records; Soleluna
- Producer: Jovanotti

Jovanotti chronology
Lorenzo 1990-1995 (1995)	Lorenzo 1997 – L'albero (1997)	Lorenzo 1999 - Capo Horn (1999)

Singles from Lorenzo 1997
- 1. "Questa è la mia casa" 2. "Bella"; 3. "Per la vita che verrà"

Professional ratings
Review scores
Source	Rating
Allmusic	4/5 stars

Lorenzo 1997 – L'albero is the seventh studio album by Italian singer-songwriter Jovanotti, released by Mercury Records on 30 January 1997.

== Track listing ==
No.	Title	Writer(s)	Length
1.	"Intro"	Jovanotti	0:59
2.	"Bella"	Jovanotti	4:36
3.	"La linea d'ombra"	Jovanotti	5:09
4.	"Questa è la mia casa"	Jovanotti	5:24
5.	"Umano"	Jovanotti	4:22
6.	"Il muratore"	Jovanotti	4:44
7.	"Canzone piccola"	Jovanotti	2:31
8.	"Il re"	Jovanotti	2:56
9.	"Per la vita che verrà"	Jovanotti	3:43
10.	"L'albero"	Jovanotti	5:10
11.	"Occhio non-vede cuore non-duole"	Jovanotti	5:19
12.	"Ueikap"	Jovanotti	4:24
13.	"Luna di città d'agosto"	Jovanotti	3:10
14.	"Il fiore del 2000"	Jovanotti	5:33
15.	"Big Bang (Parte 1 – Parole)"	Jovanotti	4:17
16.	"Big Bang (Parte 2 – Pensieri)"	Jovanotti	4:06
17.	"La ritmica"	Jovanotti	4:45
18.	"Il tamburo"	Jovanotti	3:03
19.	"La pace"	Jovanotti	3:18

== Charts and certifications ==
=== Charts ===
Chart (1997)	Peak position
Austrian Albums Chart	15
Italian Albums Chart	1
Swiss Albums Charts	10

=== Certifications ===
Region	Certification	Certified units/sales
Italy (FIMI)	5× Platinum	500,000^{*}
Switzerland (IFPI Switzerland)	Gold	25,000^{^}
^{*} Sales figures based on certification alone.^{^} Shipments figures based on certification alone.
