= Buon Sangue =

Buon sangue

Studio album by Jovanotti
- Released: 13 May 2005
- Length: 62:58
- Label: Soleluna; Universal
- Producer: Michele Canova; Jovanotti

Jovanotti chronology
Jova Live 2002 (2004)	Buon sangue (2005)	ElectroJova - Buon sangue dopato (2006)

Singles from Buon sangue
- 1. "(Tanto)³" Released: 29 April 2005; 2. "Mi fido di te" Released: 2005; 3. "Una storia d'amore" Released: 17 January 2006; 4. "Falla girare" Released: 2006; 5. "Un buco nella tasca" Released: 2006

Professional ratings
Review scores
Source	Rating
Allmusic	link

Buon sangue is the tenth studio album by Italian singer-songwriter Jovanotti. It was followed up by a live DVD of the album's songs. In Italy the album is 4× platinum with 290,000+ copies sold.

== Track listing ==
1. "(Tanto)³" – 3:33
2. "Mi fido di te" – 4:33
3. "Per me" – 4:19
4. "Falla girare" (featuring Planet Funk) – 4:32
5. "Un buco nella tasca" – 3:46
6. "Mani in alto" – 4:06
7. "Penelope" – 4:11
8. "Una storia d'amore" – 4:08
9. "La valigia" – 4:22
10. "La voglia di libertà" – 4:22
11. "Coraggio" – 4:20
12. "Bruto" – 4:27
13. "Mi disordino" – 12:14
14. "Buon sangue" (hidden track)
