= Lorenzo 1994 =

Studio album by Jovanotti
- Released: 10 January 1994
- Length: 71:45
- Label: Mercury Records, Soleluna
- Producer: Jovanotti

Jovanotti chronology
Lorenzo 1992 (1992)	Lorenzo 1994 (1994)	Lorenzo 1990-1995 (1995)

Singles from Lorenzo 1994
- 1. "Piove"; 2. "Penso positivo" 3. "Serenata Rap"

Professional ratings
Review scores
Source	Rating
Allmusic	4.5/5 stars

Lorenzo 1994 is the sixth studio album by Italian singer-songwriter Jovanotti, released by Mercury Records on 10 January 1994.

The album peaked at number one on the Italian Albums Chart. The album was preceded by the single "Piove", "Penso positivo" and "Serenata Rap". The album was ranked number five on Rolling Stone 's "100 Greatest Italian Albums of All Time".

== Track listing ==
No.	Title	Writer(s)	Length
1.	"Attaccami la spina"	Jovanotti	3:46
2.	"Serenata Rap"	Jovanotti	5:10
3.	"Penso positivo"	Jovanotti	5:06
4.	"I giovani"	Jovanotti	1:28
5.	"Si va via"	Jovanotti	4:48
6.	"Piove" (feat. Soleluna NY Lab)	Jovanotti	3:19
7.	"Voglio di +"	Jovanotti	4:22
8.	"Io ti cercherò"	Jovanotti	4:36
9.	"Il ballerino"	Jovanotti	2:20
10.	"India"	Jovanotti	1:24
11.	"Parola"	Jovanotti	4:32
12.	"Soleluna"	Jovanotti	5:11
13.	"Dammi spazio"	Jovanotti	4:08
14.	"Barabba"	Jovanotti	3:39
15.	"Dobbiamoinventarciqualcosa"	Jovanotti	4:38
16.	"Il futuro del mondo"	Jovanotti	4:24
17.	"Mario"	Jovanotti	3:37
18.	"Viene sera"	Jovanotti	4:34

== Charts and certifications ==
=== Charts ===
Chart (1994)	Peak position
Austrian Albums Chart	23
Italian Albums Chart	1
German Albums Chart	34
Swiss Albums Charts	17

=== Certifications ===
Region	Certification	Certified units/sales
Italy (FIMI)	Diamond	500,000^{*}
Switzerland (IFPI Switzerland)	Gold	25,000^{^}
^{*} Sales figures based on certification alone.^{^} Shipments figures based on certification alone.
