= Depende =

Studio album by Jarabe de Palo
- Released: 1998
- Genre: Latin, rock
- Label: EMI Music Spain
- Producer: Joe Dworniak

Jarabe de Palo chronology
La Flaca (1996)	''Depende'' (1998)	De Vuelta y Vuelta (2001)

Depende is the second album by the Spanish Latin rock group Jarabe de Palo, released in 1998.

== Track listing ==
1. Depende – 4:22
2. Pura Sangre – 4:06
3. Te Miro y Tiemblo – 4:28
4. Plaza de las Palmeras – 3:53
5. Realidad o Sueño – 4:22
6. Agua – 4:17
7. Perro Apaleao – 3:22
8. Vivo En Un Saco – 4:14
9. Toca Mi Canción – 4:39
10. Duerme Conmigo – 3:21
11. Vive y Deja Vivir – 4:26
12. Mi Mundo en Tu Mano – 3:24
13. Adiós – 4:48
14. A lo Loco [feat. Celia Cruz] – 4:13

== Charts ==
Chart (1999)	Peak position
US Top Latin Albums (Billboard)	9
US Latin Pop Albums (Billboard)	5
US Heatseekers Albums (Billboard)	34

== Certifications ==
Region	Certification	Certified units/sales
Italy (FIMI)	3× Platinum	300,000^{*}
Spain (Promusicae)	6× Platinum	600,000^{^}
^{*} Sales figures based on certification alone.^{^} Shipments figures based on certification alone.
