= Montanuy =

Montanuy Montanui (Ribagorçan) Montanui (Aragonese)
- municipality
- Location within Aragon Location within Spain
- Country: Spain
- Autonomous community: Aragon
- Province: Huesca

Area
  - Total: 174 km^{2} (67 sq mi)

Population (2025-01-01)
  - Total: 230
  - Density: 1.3/km^{2} (3.4/sq mi)
- Time zone: UTC+1 (CET)
  - Summer (DST): UTC+2 (CEST)

Montanuy (Spanish: [montaˈnuj]), in Ribagorçan Catalan and Aragonese: Montanui (locally [montaˈnuj]) is a municipality located in the province of Huesca, Aragon, Spain. According to the 2004 census (INE), the municipality has a population of 308 inhabitants.

== See also ==
- List of municipalities in Huesca
