= A te =

Single by Jovanotti

from the album Safari
- Released: March 2008
- Genre: Pop
- Length: 4:24
- Label: Universal
- Songwriters: Lorenzo Cherubini, Franco Santarnecchi
- Producer: Michele Canova

Jovanotti singles chronology
"Fango" (2007)	"A te" (2008)	"Safari" (2008)

Music video
- "A te" on YouTube

"A te" (Italian for To you) is a song recorded by Italian singer-songwriter Jovanotti and written by Jovanotti himself with Franco Santarnecchi. After being included in the album Safari, the song was released as the second single from the set. Launched during the Sanremo Music Festival 2008, where Jovanotti was invited as a guest, the single became a commercial success, reaching the top spot of the Italian Singles Chart for eight consecutive weeks, later becoming the best-selling single of 2008 in Italy.

In 2009, the song received a nomination for the Mogol Award, created with the purpose to recognize the Italian song with the best lyrics.

== Background ==
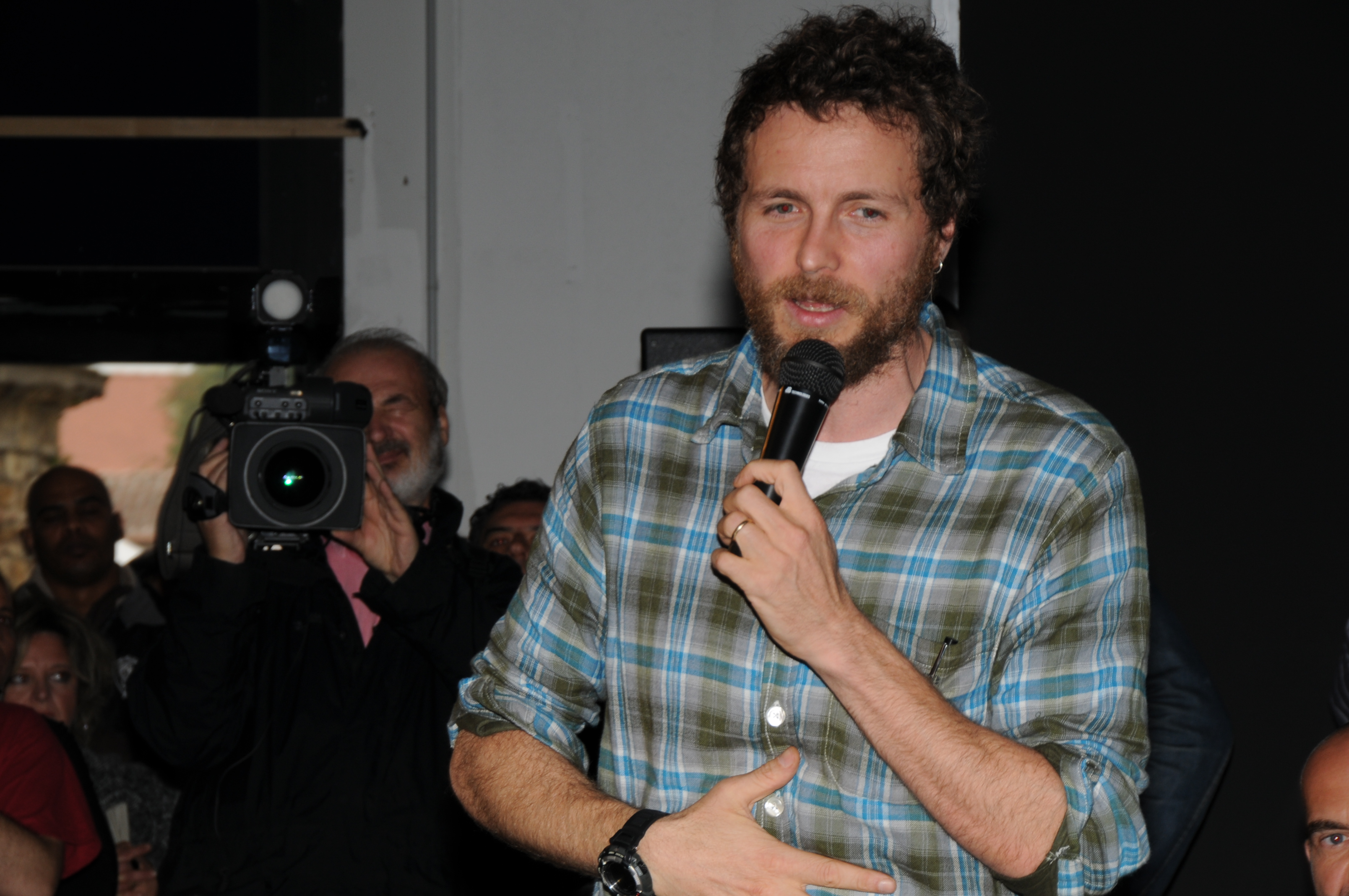
Jovanotti wrote the song as a love declaration to his partner, who later became his wife, during a moment of separation.

"A te" is a romantic piano ballad, written by Jovanotti and Franco Santarnecchi and produced by Michele Canova. The song is a love declaration to Jovanotti's partner, Francesca Valiani, who became his wife in September 2008. During an interview, when questioned about the inspiration for the song, Jovanotti explained: "I tried to put together the best love declaration I could write, even being far from reality... In fact I wrote it while I was far away from Francesca, and maybe in that status of distance I found the right inspiration".

According to Jovanotti, he wrote the lyrics in one go. He added: "I composed the music with my pianist Franco Santarnecchi, and the melodic line was coming out more or less defined, while I was writing the lyrics. It's a song which is based on the strength of words". In a 2011 interview, he confirmed that he wrote the song in five minutes only, claiming that "it was already inside" of him.

== Live performances ==
The song was premiered during the fourth night of the 58th Sanremo Music Festival, when Jovanotti performed as a musical guest. The video album Nessuna ombra intorno features a live performance of "A te", recorded during the Safari tour in 2008. The album Oyeah, released in December 2009 in the United States only, includes an "official live bootleg" version of "A te", while 2011 video album Live 'Ora' in tour features a recording of a live performance of the song during the Ora tour. Another live recording of the song was included in Jovanotti's 2012 live album Lorenzo in concerto per Jovanotti e orchestra, with a new arrangement by Paolo Buonvino.

== Commercial performance ==
The song became a commercial success in Jovanotti's native Italy. It debuted on the Italian FIMI Top Digital Downloads chart in January 2008. After spending four weeks in the top 20, peaking at number 6 during its third week, the song fell out the chart, but re-entered it in March of the same year, following Jovanotti's performance during the Sanremo Music Festival 2008. In mid-April 2008, "A te" reached the top spot of the chart, holding it for eight consecutive weeks. After becoming the best-selling single of the year in Italy, "A te" completed its chart run within the Italian top 20 in January 2009, after 45 non-consecutive weeks on the chart. The single was also certified multi-platinum by the Federation of the Italian Music Industry. In Switzerland, "A te" spent 25 weeks on the Singles Top 75, peaking at number 21 and thus becoming Jovanotti's second highest-charting single behind "Gimme Five", which peaked at number 11 in 1988.

During an interview released to Italian newspaper Il Secolo XIX, when asked to comment on the success of the song, Jovanotti claimed that "the thing that worked was authenticity. It is a very simple song, with an ABC melody, a harmonic progression which is the usual one. I liked it since the moment when I wrote it, I couldn't change anything of it. Because authenticity doesn't show itself with composition, but with voice, with some words put together. It's the magic balance of some songs which break generational walls, an element which, thanks to heaven, we still can't define".

== Critical reception ==
In Rolling Stone Italy's review to the album Safari, the song was described as "a mawkish dirge of nuptial love, maybe the most poetic part of the album, [...] but you really must have a heart of stone not to feel a tear (also a little one) coming down as you listen to [the song's chorus]". Allmusic's Mariano Prunes considered "A te" as "far and away the best song in the album, the newest entry in Jovanotti's classic love song catalog".

== Plagiarism allegations ==
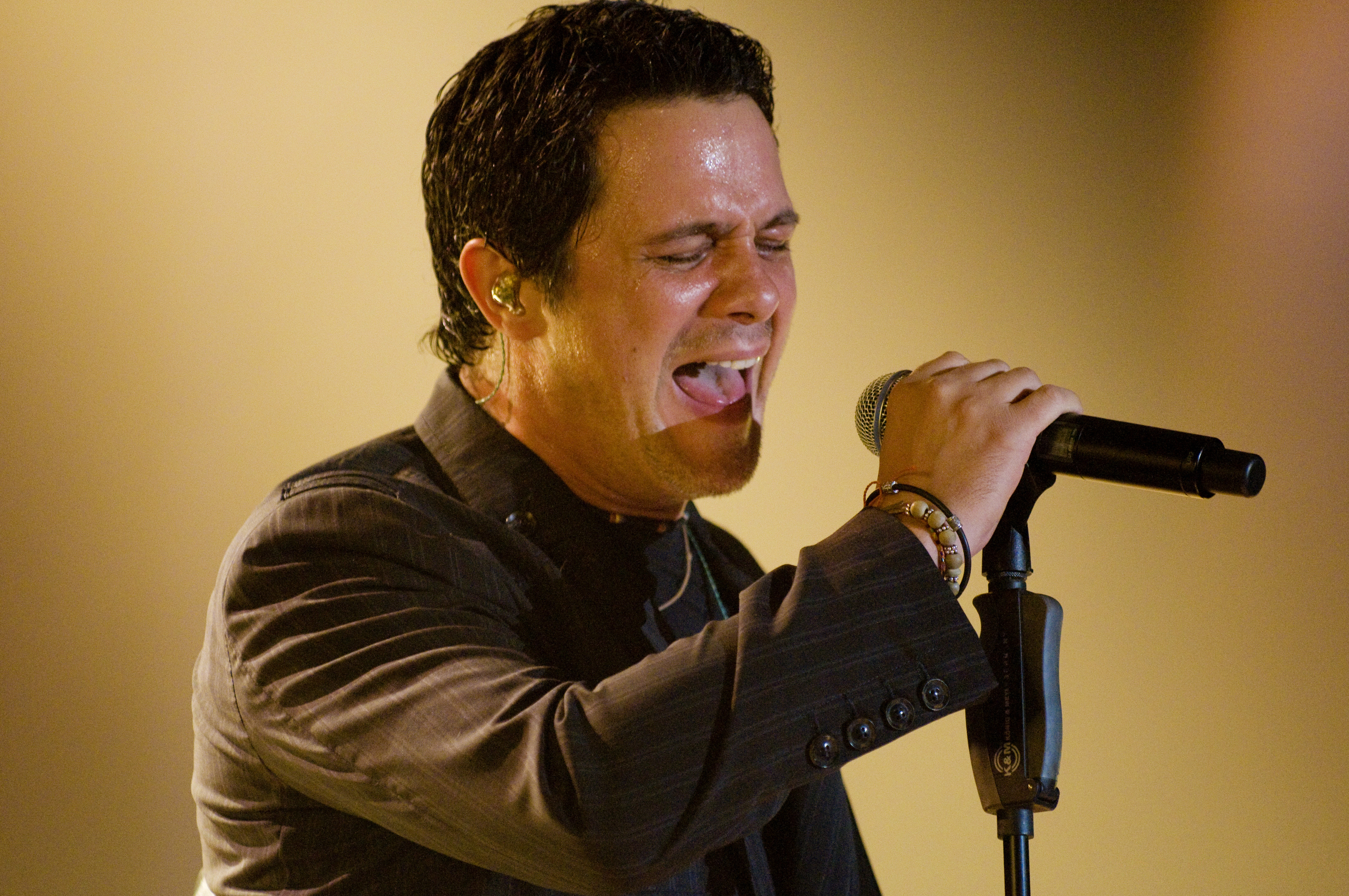
According to El Mundo's Quico Alsedo, "A te" could be a plagiarism of "A la primera persona" by Alejandro Sanz.

In July 2008, Spanish journalist Quico Alsedo of El Mundo wrote a post on his blog Rock & Blog, hosted on the newspaper's website, in which he claimed the song is very similar to "A la primera persona" by Alejandro Sanz, included in his 2006 album El Tren de los Momentos, hinting that Jovanotti could have plagiarised it and criticizing record labels for "considering us dumb, trying to sell us the same dog with two different collars". Alsedo wrote that "in both cases, the melodic line of the voice perfectly fits the music base", also adding that both songs are based on a very common melody.

Jovanotti reacted to these allegations claiming that "melodies can be similar, and sometimes this is accidental, sometimes it's not. In this case, I had never heard Alejandro's song, which is very good like many others of his songs, until a couple of months ago, when somebody told me about this similarity. But my album had been released a lot of time before." Jovanotti also added that both songs are based on a very simple harmonic line, which is adopted by hundreds of songs and which somebody believes was invented by Johann Sebastian Bach.

== Music video ==
A music video for the song, directed by Maki Gherzi, was released to accompany the single. The video shows Jovanotti alone in a timeless recording studio, wearing a golden jacket, while he plays piano. Gherzi and Jovanotti later revealed that the video's concept, which emerged after considering several options, is based on simplicity, and that they wanted to represent a man without any defense, while the woman is only represented as a metaphor by the light shining on Jovanotti's jacket.

== Cover versions ==
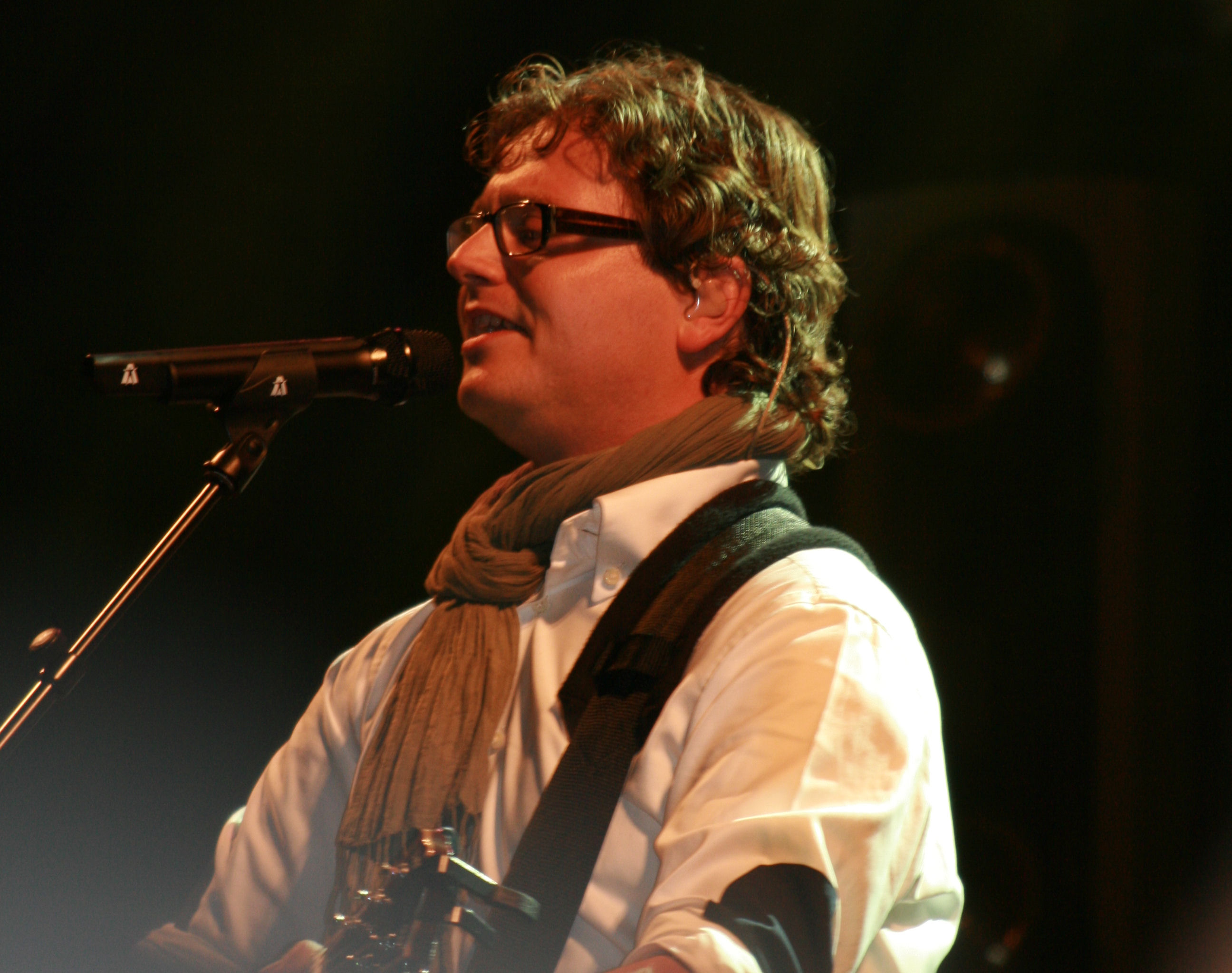
Guus Meeuwis recorded the song in Dutch as "Dat komt door jou", achieving commercial success in the Netherlands.

In 2009, Dutch singer Guus Meeuwis recorded a Dutch-language version of the song, titled "Dat komt door jou" and released as the lead single from his album NW8. The single peaked at number 4 on the Single Top 100 and reached the 11th spot on the Dutch Top 40. Italian singer Gianni Morandi included a cover of the song in his albums Canzoni da non perdere in 2009 and Rinascimento in 2011. In 2010 Helen Adamson released Estonian version of this song under title "Kas tead?". In 2015 Mexican singer Emmanuel released a Spanish version titled “A ti”, as one of the singles of his album “Inédito”.

== Charts ==
Chart (2008)	Peak position
Italy (FIMI)	1
Switzerland (Schweizer Hitparade)	21

== Certifications ==
Region	Certification	Certified units/sales
Italy (FIMI) Since 2009	6× Platinum	300,000^{‡}
^{‡} Sales+streaming figures based on certification alone.
