= Jovanotti =

Italian singer-songwriter and rapper (born 1966)

Jovanotti OMRI
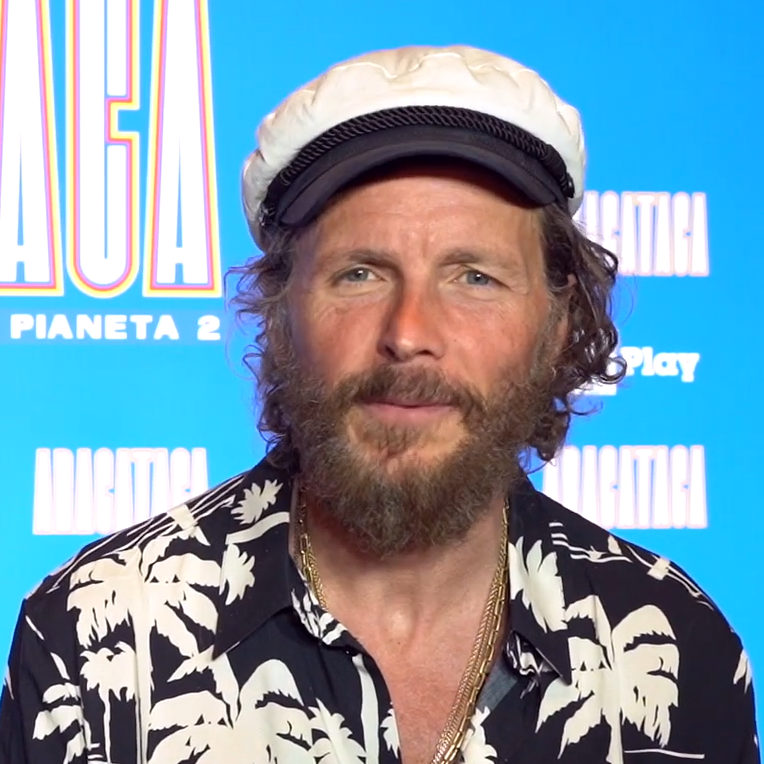
- Jovanotti in 2022

Background information
- Also known as: Jovanotti, Gino Latino, Jeronimo
- Born: Lorenzo Cherubini; 27 September 1966 (age 60); Rome, Italy
- Genres: Pop; alternative hip hop; funk; world; pop rock
- Occupations: Singer-songwriter; rapper; disc jockey
- Instruments: Drum; guitar
- Years active: 1988–present
- Labels: Ibiza Records; Free Records Independent; Mercury; ATO; MapleMusic (Canada); Verve; Universal; Soleluna
- Website: www.soleluna.com www.jova.tv

Lorenzo Cherubini (Italian: [loˈrɛntso keruˈbiːni]; born 27 September 1966), known professionally as Jovanotti (Italian: [dʒovaˈnɔtti]), is an Italian singer-songwriter, rapper, and disc jockey.

The name Jovanotti derives from giovanotti, the plural form of the Italian word giovanotto ("young man"). Cherubini initially chose "Joe Vanotti" as his stage name, but a promotional poster for a night club incorrectly billed him as "Jovanotti" and the name stuck. The spelling Jovanotti is anglicized; the letter J is rarely used in Italian. Jovanotti is commonly known to his fans by the diminutive form "Jova", and often refers to himself that way in promotional items and on his Web TV channel Jova.TV, which launched 2 October 2014.

Jovanotti gradually departed from his early mix of hip hop, rap and disco, taking in funk, world music and even classical arrangements and ska influences. As his musical influences changed, so did his lyrics too, which over time began to increasingly address philosophical, religious and political issues, which are more typical of the Italian cantautore tradition. His social and political commitment increased as well. Some of his earlier work is also closer to keyboard-heavy 1980s pop.

Most of his songs are sung in Italian; he also released a greatest hits album with a couple of songs in Spanish-language. His live album includes a short version of the Sugarhill Gang's "Rapper's Delight". Jovanotti appears on several international compilations, most notably Red Hot + Rhapsody, a 1998 tribute to George Gershwin, on which he performed "I Got Rhythm". Jovanotti also appeared in one of Luciano Pavarotti's charity concerts in 1996.

== Biography ==
=== Early life ===
Cherubini was born on 27 September 1966 in Rome to Tuscan parents, Mario and Viola Cardinali, but he spent part of his childhood in his parents' hometown, Cortona, in the province of Arezzo, Tuscany.

After completing his high-school studies, he started working as a disc jockey in several discothèques and radio stations in the province of Rome. In 1985 he moved to Milan. Two years later, during the summer of 1987, while he was playing a DJ set in Palinuro, he met the record producer and talent scout Claudio Cecchetto, who proposed they begin working together. That same year Jovanotti released his first single, "Walking," and started working as a DJ for one of the most prominent national radio stations, Radio DeeJay, which was founded by Cecchetto five years earlier.

=== Career ===
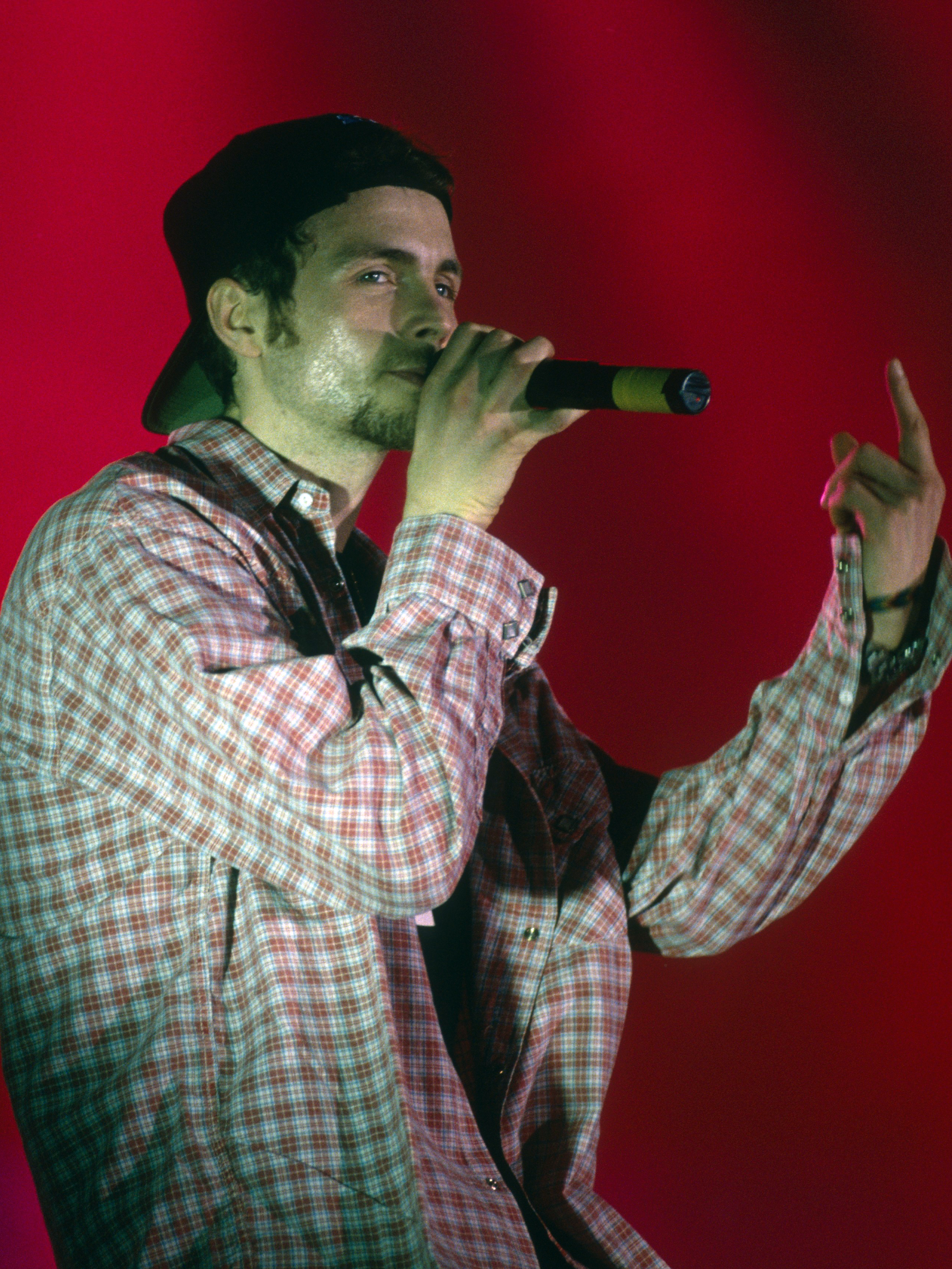
Jovanotti in 1993

His first studio album, Jovanotti for President, was released in 1988 and became the symbol of the Italian youth of the eighties, without any interest in ideologies and politics. Despite receiving strongly negative criticism, the album became a big commercial success, reaching the third position on the Italian Musica e dischi Albums Chart and selling over 400,000 copies in Italy. Moreover, the album spawned five singles, including the number-one hits, "Gimme Five" (also the name of his British TV show for Janet Street Porter's DEF II youth TV block on BBC Two) and "Gimme Five (Rasta Five)" and the songs "Go Jovanotti Go" and "Mix, Remix & The singers," which entered the Italian top 5.

In 1998, Jovanotti played a brief role in the movie I Giardini dell'Eden, directed by Alessandro D'Alatri.

The song "Piove" was released for the second season of The Sopranos as an ending credits track.

His 2005 CD, Buon Sangue, was influenced by both rock and old school hip hop. It is one of his most innovative works to date. Edoardo Bennato collaborated on one track, while bass player Saturnino co-wrote two of the songs.

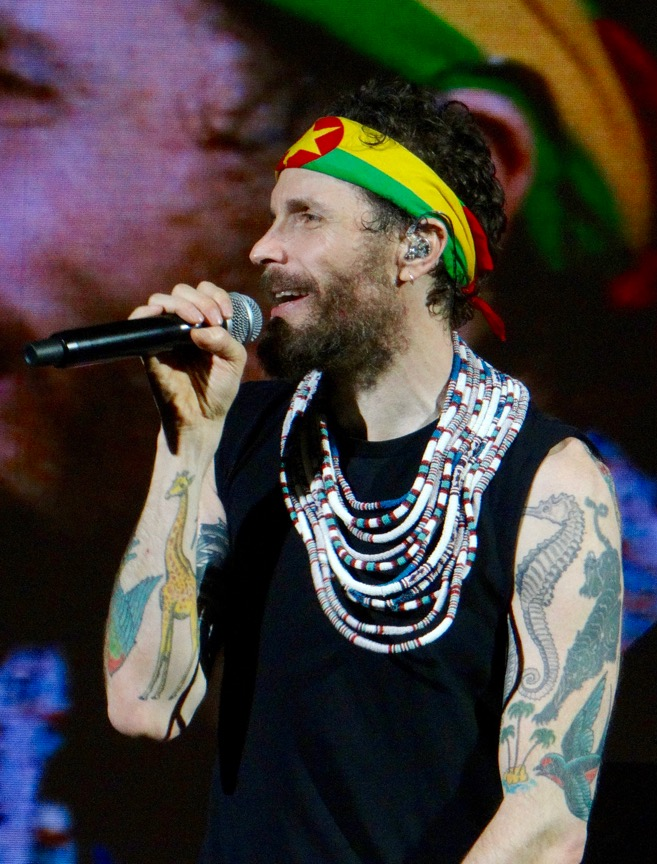
Jovanotti in 2016

In 2007 he was featured at the end of Negramaro's song, "Cade la Pioggia," of their CD, La Finestra, and in 2008 he released the new album Safari.

In 2008 he performed as guest artist on the track "Lugar Comum" from the album Encanto. At the end of 2009, he collaborated with Claudio Baglioni and Fabrizio Bosso, along with 70 other artists, in the song "Con tutto il mio cuore (With All My Heart)." On 1 January 2010 the group released "Baciami ancora (Kiss Me Again)" for the soundtrack of a film by Gabriele Muccino.

In December 2010 he achieved a number one hit on the Italian Top 20 charts with "Tutto l'amore che ho." On 25 January 2011, he released his eighteenth album Ora. Later in 2011 he played at the Bonnaroo Music Festival.

== Commitment ==
Along with the evolution of his sound, his social and political commitment for mainstream causes has increased since the 1990s. As a convinced pacifist, he frequently worked with organizations such as Make Poverty History, Amnesty International, and he has contributed to events dedicated to debt relief (Global Call to Action Against Poverty).

Jovanotti has a friendship with Bono due to their mutual quest for the cancellation of foreign debt in poor African countries. He also collaborated with Michael Franti of Spearhead on his Capo Horn and Ora albums. Both Michael Franti and U2 misspelled his name as Giovanotti in the liner note credits.

== Television ==
Even though Jovanotti has never had a UK chart hit under his own name, he was briefly known in the United Kingdom as the presenter of the DEF II programme Gimme 5. The show, which featured a brief introduction each week by Jovanotti, showcased youth television programmes from around the world. Starting in 1990, he also hosted the similarly formatted Earth to MTV for U.S. cable television; this music-video showcase competed with similar programming on VH1 (New Visions: Worldbeat), Bravo (Big World Cafe), and Spanish-language Telemundo (MTV Internacional) and Univision (Tu Musica).

In 2020 he released exclusively for RaiPlay the documentary in sixteen episodes "Non voglio cambiare Pianeta" (I don't want to change Planet) which he filmed whilst travelling from Chile to Argentina on his bicycle, between January and February 2020.

In 2025, he was announced as a special guest of Sanremo Music Festival. He has performed during the first night.

== Gino Latino ==
Jovanotti was behind one of two rival Gino Latino italo house tracks in the early 1990s. His Gino Latino single, "Welcome", reached number 17 on the UK Singles Chart.

== Personal life ==
On 6 September 2008, Jovanotti married Francesca Valiani at Cortona, in the Church of Santa Maria Nuova. Their daughter Teresa was born in 1998. He dedicated the lullaby "Per te" to Teresa, one of the hits of the album Capo Horn (1999), and the song "Libera" from the album Lorenzo 2015 cc.

Jovanotti believes in a God but he does not follow any religion.

== Discography ==
Studio albums

- Jovanotti for President (1988)
- La mia moto (1989)
- Giovani Jovanotti (1990)
- Una tribù che balla (1991)
- Lorenzo 1992 (1992)
- Lorenzo 1994 (1994)
- Lorenzo 1997 - L'albero (1997)
- Lorenzo 1999 - Capo Horn (1999)
- Lorenzo 2002 - Il quinto mondo (2002)
- Buon sangue (2005)
- Safari (2008)
- Ora (2011)
- Lorenzo 2015 CC. (2015)
- Oh, Vita! (2017)
- Jova Beach Party (2019)
- Lorenzo sulla luna (2019)
- Il disco del Sole (2022)
- Il corpo umano – vol. 1 (2025)

== Filmography ==
Year	Title	Role	Notes
1992	Parenti serpenti	Himself	Uncredited cameo
1998	The Garden of Eden	David	
1998	Jolly Blu	Record label's president	
2007	The Simpsons	Milo (voice)	Episode: "Husbands and Knives"

== Awards and nominations ==
Year	Award	Nomination	Work	Result
1996	MTV Video Music Awards	Best European Video	"L'ombelico del mondo"	Nominated
1998	Premio Italiano della Musica	Italian Album of the Year	Lorenzo 1997 - L'albero	Nominated
1998	Premio Italiano della Musica	Italian Song of the Year	"Bella"	Nominated
1998	Premio Italiano della Musica	Italian Tour of the Year	Lorenzo Tour 1997	Nominated
1998	Premio Italiano della Musica	Special Award – Radio DeeJay	Himself	Won
1999	MTV Europe Music Awards	Best Italian Act	Himself	Nominated
2000	Premio Italiano della Musica	Song of the Year	"Il mio nome è mai più" (with Ligabue & Piero Pelù)	Won
2000	Premio Italiano della Musica	Music Video of the Year	"Il mio nome è mai più" (with Ligabue & Piero Pelù)	Won
2000	Lunezia Award	Best Singer-Songwriter Album	Lorenzo 1999 - Capo Horn	Nominated
2001	Italian Music Awards	Best Tour	Lorenzo Tour 1999	Nominated
2001	Italian Music Awards	Best Music Video	"File Not Found"	Nominated
2002	Premio Videoclip Italiano	Best Music Video of Research	"Salvami"	Won
2005	Premio Videoclip Italian	Best Music Video by a Male Artist	"(Tanto)³"	Won
2006	Premio Amnesty Italia	Voices for Freedom	"Mani in alto"	Nominated
2006	MTV Europe Music Awards	Best Italian Act	Himself	Nominated
2006	Premio Videoclip Italiano	Best Music Video by a Male Artist	"Falla girare"	Won
2008	Mogol Award	Best Lyrics	"Fango"	Won
2008	World Music Awards	Best-Selling Italian Artist	Himself	Won
2008	Premio Videoclip Italiano	Special Award for the Art of Music Videos	Himself	Won
2008	Musica e Dischi Critics' Prize	Best Italian Album	Safari	Won
2009	Mogol Award	Best Lyrics	"A te"	Nominated
2010	David di Donatello	Best Song	"Baciami ancora" (from Baciami ancora)	Won
2010	Nastro d'Argento	Best Original Song	"Baciami ancora" (from Baciami ancora)	Nominated
2011	TRL Awards	Superman Award	Himself	Nominated
2011	Mogol Award	Best Lyrics	"Le tasche piene di sassi"	Won
2011	MTV Europe Music Awards	Best Italian Act	Himself	Nominated
2011	Musica e Dischi Critics' Prize	Best Italian Album – Pop & Rock	Ora	Won
2011	Musica e Dischi Critics' Prize	Best Concert Tour	Lorenzo Live – Ora in Tour 2011–2012	Won
2011	Rockol Awards	Best Italian Album	Ora	Won
2011	Rockol Awards	Best Italian Single	"Il più grande spettacolo dopo il Big Bang"	Nominated
2011	Rockol Awards	Best Italian Tour	Lorenzo Live – Ora in Tour 2011–2012	Nominated
2012	TRL Awards	Superman Award	Himself	Nominated
2012	TRL Awards	Best Video	"Il più grande spettacolo dopo il Big Bang"	Nominated
2013	MTV Italian Music Awards	TwITStar	Himself	Nominated
2013	Medimex Awards	Artist of the Year – Special Award	Himself	Won
2015	MTV Italian Music Awards	TwITStar	Himself	Nominated
2015	Medimex Awards	Best Album	Lorenzo 2015 CC.	Won
2015	Medimex Awards	Best Music Video	"Sabato"	Won
2015	Medimex Awards	Best Concert Tour	Lorenzo negli stadi 2015	Won
2016	Assomusica Award	Music Award for Best Visual Live Show 2015	Lorenzo negli stadi 2015	Won
2016	Onstage Awards	Platinum Ticket – Most-viewed Italian tour in indoor arenas	Lorenzo nei Palasport	Won
2016	Onstage Awards	Best Performer	Himself	Nominated
2016	Onstage Awards	Best Tour	Himself	Nominated
2016	Onstage Awards	Live Anthem	"Gli immortali"	Nominated
2016	Onstage Awards	Best Look	Himself	Nominated
2017	David di Donatello	Best Original Song	"L'estate addosso"	Nominated

== Honours ==
– Commander Order of Merit of the Italian Republic: Awarded the third highest civil honour in Italy, by President Sergio Mattarella on 30 January 2026.

== Bibliography ==
- Yo, brothers and sisters: siamo o non siamo un bel movimento? preface by Roberto D'Agostino, Milano, Vallardi, 1988. ICCU IT\ICCU\RMS\0159339
- Cherubini, S.l., Soleluna, 1993. ICCU IT\ICCU\MOD\0315228
- Il grande boh!, Milano, Feltrinelli, 1998. ISBN 88-07-70102-2
- Quarantology, 1966-2006, Milano, Rizzoli, 2006. ISBN 88-17-01165-7
- La parrucca di Mozart, Torino, Einaudi, 2009. ISBN 978-88-06-20054-1
- Per te, Roma, Gallucci, 2009. ISBN 978-88-6145-086-8
- Viva tutto!, Add Editore, 2010. ISBN 978-88-96873-18-2
- Gratitude, Torino, Einaudi, 2013. ISBN 978-88-06-21834-8
- Sbam!, Milano, Mondadori, 2017. ISBN 978-88-04-68543-2
