= Tiziano Ferro discography =

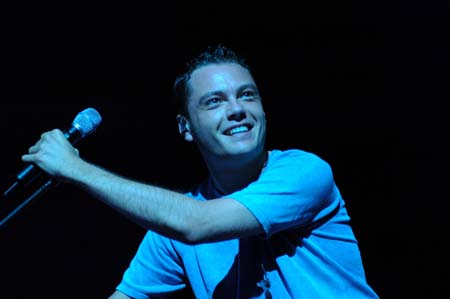
- Ferro performing in 2006
- Studio albums: 8
- Compilation albums: 1
- Singles: 64
- Video albums: 1
- Music videos: 28
- Box sets: 1

The discography of Italian pop singer and songwriter Tiziano Ferro consists of nine studio albums, a greatest hits album, a covers album, one video album, 49 singles as lead singer, 15 singles as a featured artist and a box set.

== Albums ==
=== Studio albums ===
List of albums, with selected chart positions, sales, and certifications
Title	Album details	Peak chart positions									Sales	Certifications
Title	Album details	ITA	AUT	BEL (WA)	FRA	GER	MEX	SPA	SWI	US Latin	Sales	Certifications
Rosso relativo Rojo relativo	First studio album; Released: 26 October 2001; Label: EMI; Format: CD	5	7	18	25	9	—	22	5	35	ITA: 300,000; EU: 1,000,000	FIMI: 3× Platinum; BEA: Gold; IFPI SWI: Platinum; PROMUSICAE: Platinum
111 Centoundici 111 Ciento once	Second studio album; Released: 7 November 2003; Label: EMI; Format: CD	1	—	48	—	61	1	21	7	32	ITA: 450,000; World: 1,000,000	FIMI: 4× Platinum; AMPROFON: 2× Platinum + Gold; IFPI SWI: Gold; PROMUSICAE: Gold
Nessuno è solo Nadie está solo	Third studio album; Released: 23 June 2006; Label: EMI; Format: CD, digital download	1	6	8	166	44	—	11	1	68	ITA: 580,000; World: 1,500,000	FIMI: Diamond; IFPI SWI: Platinum
Alla mia età A mi edad	Fourth studio album; Released: 7 November 2008; Label: EMI; Format: CD, digital download	1	40	66	—	97	75	11	4	—	ITA: 550,000	FIMI: Diamond; IFPI SWI: Platinum
L'amore è una cosa semplice El amor es una cosa simple	Fifth studio album; Released: 28 November 2011; Label: EMI; Format: CD, digital download	1	—	6	—	—	77	13	5	—	ITA: 480,000	IFPI SWI: Gold; FIMI: 8× Platinum
Il mestiere della vita El oficio de la vida	Sixth studio album; Released: 2 December 2016; Label: Universal; Format: CD, digital download	1	—	55	—	—	—	34	4	—		FIMI: 6× Platinum
Accetto miracoli Acepto milagros	Seventh studio album; Released: 22 November 2019; Label: Universal; Format: CD, digital download	1	—	62	—	—	—	44	7	—		FIMI: 3× Platinum
Il mondo è nostro El mundo es nuestro	Eighth studio album; Released: 10 November 2022; Label: Universal; Format: CD, vinyl, digital download	1	—	—	—	—	—	—	12	—		FIMI: Platinum
Sono un grande	Ninth studio album; Released: 24 October 2025; Label: Sugar Music; Format: CD, vinyl, digital download	1	—	—	—	—	—	—	30	—		FIMI: Gold
"—" denotes albums that did not chart or were not released

=== Compilation albums ===
List of albums, with selected chart positions, sales, and certifications
Title	Album details	Peak chart positions				Certifications
Title	Album details	ITA	BEL (WA)	SPA	SWI	Certifications
TZN – The Best of Tiziano Ferro	Released: 25 November 2014; Label: Universal; Formats: CD, digital download	1	72	8	29	FIMI: 8× Platinum

=== Covers albums ===
List of albums, with selected chart positions, sales, and certifications
Title	Album details	Peak chart positions	Certifications
Title	Album details	ITA	Certifications
Accetto miracoli: l'esperienza degli altri	Released: 6 November 2020; Label: Virgin, Universal; Formats: CD, digital download	75	

=== Video albums ===
List of albums, with selected chart positions and certifications
Title	Album details	Peak chart positions	Certifications
Title	Album details	ITA	Certifications
Alla mia età – Live in Rome	Released: 20 November 2009; Label: EMI Music Italy; Format: DVD	1	FIMI: Platinum

=== Box sets ===
List of box sets, with chart positions
Title	Album details	Peak chart positions		Certifications
Title	Album details	ITA	BEL (WA)	Certifications
The Album Collection	Released: 23 November 2010; Label: EMI Music Italy; Format: 4× CD; Includes Ferro's first four Italian studio albums	17	152	FIMI: Gold

== Singles ==
List of singles, with selected chart positions, showing year released and album name
Single	Year	Peak chart positions									Certifications	Album
Single	Year	ITA	AUT	BEL (WA)	FRA	GER	GRE	NLD	SPA	SWI	Certifications	Album
"Xdono" / "Perdona" / "Perdoa"	2001	1	2	1	6	2	8	1	4	4	FIMI: 2× Platinum; BEA: Platinum; BVMI: Gold; IFPI SWI: Gold; SNEP: Gold	Rosso relativo Rojo relativo
"L'olimpiade" / "La olimpiada"	2001	—	—	—	—	—	—	—	—	49		Rosso relativo Rojo relativo
"Imbranato" / "Alucinado"	2002	—	44	6	31	52	—	85	—	29	FIMI: Gold	Rosso relativo Rojo relativo
"Rosso relativo" / "Rojo relativo"	2002	11	—	45	61	49	—	—	—	36	FIMI: Gold	Rosso relativo Rojo relativo
"Le cose che non dici" / "Las cosas que no dices"	2002	—	—	—	—	—	—	—	—	—		Rosso relativo Rojo relativo
"Xverso" / "Un Pour Toi Un Pour Moi" / "Perverso"	2003	5	—	39	—	48	—	—	5	17		111 (and re-released edition)
"Sere nere" / "Tardes negras"	2003	—	—	44	—	77	—	99	8	32	FIMI: 2× Platinum	111 (and re-released edition)
"Non me lo so spiegare" / "No me lo puedo explicar"	2004	—	—	—	—	—	—	—	—	—	FIMI: Platinum	111 (and re-released edition)
"Ti voglio bene" / "Desde mañana no lo sé"	2004	—	—	—	—	—	—	—	—	—		111 (and re-released edition)
"Universal Prayer" (featuring Jamelia)	2004	1	46	51	—	52	49	69	—	31		111 (and re-released edition)
"Stop! Dimentica" / "Stop! Olvídate"	2006	1	1	14	—	50	—	—	10	3	IFPI SWI: Gold	Nessuno è solo Nadie está solo
"Ed ero contentissimo" / "Y estaba contentísimo"	2006	2	—	33	—	—	—	—	—	72	FIMI: Gold	Nessuno è solo Nadie está solo
"Ti scatterò una foto" / "Te tomaré una foto"	2007	4	—	—	—	—	—	—	—	98	FIMI: 2× Platinum	Nessuno è solo Nadie está solo
"E Raffaella è mia" / "Y Raffaella es mía"	2007	3	—	—	—	—	—	—	—	—		Nessuno è solo Nadie está solo
"E fuori è buio" / "Y está oscuro"	2007	34	—	—	—	—	—	—	—	—		Nessuno è solo Nadie está solo
"Alla mia età" / "A mi edad" / "À mon âge"	2008	1	—	—	—	—	—	—	—	33	FIMI: Gold	Alla mia età A mi edad
"Il regalo più grande" / "El regalo más grande" (feat. Anahí and Dulce María of RBD / Amaia Montero)	2009	2	—	—	—	—	—	—	11	—	FIMI: Platinum; PROMUSICAE: Platinum	Alla mia età A mi edad
"Indietro" / "Breathe Gentle" (featuring Kelly Rowland)	2009	2	—	53	—	—	—	7	—	—	FIMI: Platinum	Alla mia età A mi edad
"Il sole esiste per tutti"	2009	14	—	—	—	—	—	—	—	—		Alla mia età A mi edad
"Scivoli di nuovo"	2009	16	—	—	—	—	—	—	—	—		Alla mia età A mi edad
"La differenza tra me e te" / "La diferencia entre tú y yo"	2011	2	—	3	—	—	—	—	—	51	FIMI: Multi-platinum	L'amore è una cosa semplice El amor es una cosa simple
"L'ultima notte al mondo" / "La última noche del mundo"	2012	5	—	—	—	—	—	—	—	—	FIMI: 2× Platinum	L'amore è una cosa semplice El amor es una cosa simple
"Hai delle isole negli occhi"	2012	17	—	—	—	—	—	—	—	—	FIMI: Gold	L'amore è una cosa semplice El amor es una cosa simple
"Liebe is einfach/L'amore è una cosa semplice" (featuring Cassandra Steen)	2012	—	—	—	—	—	—	—	—	—		L'amore è una cosa semplice El amor es una cosa simple
"Per dirti ciao!"	2012	20	—	—	—	—	—	—	—	—	FIMI: Platinum	L'amore è una cosa semplice El amor es una cosa simple
"El amor es una cosa simple" (featuring Malú)	2012	—	—	—	—	—	—	—	16	—		L'amore è una cosa semplice El amor es una cosa simple
"Troppo buono" / "Demasiado bueno"	2012	10	—	—	—	—	—	—	—	—	FIMI: Platinum	L'amore è una cosa semplice El amor es una cosa simple
"L'amore è una cosa semplice"	2012	9	—	—	—	—	—	—	—	—	FIMI: Platinum	L'amore è una cosa semplice El amor es una cosa simple
"La fine"	2013	34	—	—	—	—	—	—	—	—	FIMI: Platinum	L'amore è una cosa semplice El amor es una cosa simple
"Senza scappare mai più" / "No escaparé nunca más"	2014	2	—	75	—	—	—	—	—	57	FIMI: Platinum	TZN - The Best of Tiziano Ferro
"Incanto" / "Encanto" (featuring Pablo López)	2015	4	—	—	—	—	—	—	—	—	FIMI: 2× Platinum	TZN - The Best of Tiziano Ferro
"Lo stadio" / "Un estadio"	2015	23	—	—	—	—	—	—	—	—	FIMI: 2× Platinum	TZN - The Best of Tiziano Ferro
"Il vento"	2015	76	—	—	—	—	—	—	—	—		TZN - The Best of Tiziano Ferro
"Potremmo ritornare" / "Podríamos regresar"	2016	1	—	90	—	—	—	—	—	72	FIMI: 3× Platinum	Il mestiere della vita
"Il conforto" (feat. Carmen Consoli)	2017	4	—	—	—	—	—	—	—	—	FIMI: 3× Platinum	Il mestiere della vita
"Mi sono innamorato di te"	2017	51	—	—	—	—	—	—	—	—		Non-album single
"Lento/Veloce"	2017	17	—	—	—	—	—	—	—	—	FIMI: 2× Platinum	Il mestiere della vita
"Valore assoluto"	2017	61	—	—	—	—	—	—	—	—		Il mestiere della vita
"Buona (cattiva) sorte"	2019	14	—	—	—	—	—	—	—	—	FIMI: Gold	Accetto miracoli
"Accetto miracoli"	2019	5	—	—	—	—	—	—	—	—	FIMI: Platinum	Accetto miracoli
"Balla per me" (feat. Jovanotti)	2020	36	—	—	—	—	—	—	—	—	FIMI: Platinum	Accetto miracoli
"La vita splendida"	2022	46	—	—	—	—	—	—	—	—	FIMI: Gold	Il mondo è nostro
"Rotonda"	2023	4	—	—	—	—	—	—	—	—	FIMI: Platinum	Il mondo è nostro
"Destinazione mare"	2023	69	—	—	—	—	—	—	—	—	FIMI: Gold	Il mondo è nostro
"Abbiamo vinto già" (with J-Ax)	2023	79	—	—	—	—	—	—	—	—		Il mondo è nostro
"Cuore rotto"	2025	15	—	—	—	—	—	—	—	—		Sono un grande
"Fingo&spingo"	2025	46	—	—	—	—	—	—	—	—		Sono un grande
"Sono un grande"	2026	—	—	—	—	—	—	—	—	—		Sono un grande
"Superstar" (with Giorgia)	2026	91	—	—	—	—	—	—	—	—		Sono un grande
"XXdono" (with Lazza)	2026	12	—	—	—	—	—	—	—	—		Sono un grande
"—" denotes singles that did not chart or were not released

=== Featured singles ===
List of singles, with selected chart positions, showing year released and album name
Single	Year	Peak chart positions		Certifications	Album
Single	Year	ITA	SPA	Certifications	Album
"Sulla mia pelle" (ATPC featuring Tiziano Ferro)	1998	—	—		Anima e corpo
"Latido urbano" (Among Tony Aguilar y amigos)	2003	—	3		Tony Aguilar y amigos
"Tarde negra" (Liah featuring Tiziano Ferro)	2005	—	—		Perdas e Ganhos
"Non me lo so spiegare" "No me lo puedo explicar" (Laura Pausini featuring Tiziano Ferro)	2007	24	—		Io canto
"Cuestión de feeling" (Mina featuring Tiziano Ferro)	2007	—	—		Todavía
"Sogni risplendono" (Linea 77 featuring Tiziano Ferro)	2008	—	—		Horror Vacui
"Il re di chi ama troppo" (Fiorella Mannoia featuring Tiziano Ferro)	2009	—	—		Il movimento del dare
"Domani 21/04.2009" (Among Artisti Uniti per l'Abruzzo)	2009	1	—	FIMI: Multi-platinum	Charity single
"Each Tear" (Mary J. Blige featuring Tiziano Ferro)	2010	1	—	FIMI: Gold	Stronger with Each Tear
"A muso duro" (Among Italia Loves Emilia)	2012	20	—		Italia Loves Emilia - Il concerto
"Killer" (Baby K featuring Tiziano Ferro)	2013	10	—	FIMI: Platinum	Una seria
"Sei sola" (Baby K featuring Tiziano Ferro)	2013	94	—		Una seria
"Senza un posto nel mondo" (Marracash featuring Tiziano Ferro)	2015	—	—		Status
"Vamos a bailar (Esta vida nueva)" (Paola & Chiara featuring Tiziano Ferro)	2023	—	—		Per sempre
"Feeling" (with Elodie)	2024	9	—	FIMI: Gold	Mi ami mi odi
"—" denotes singles that did not chart or were not released

== Other charted songs ==
List of charted songs with chart positions, showing year released and album name
Song	Year	Peak chart positions		Album
Song	Year	ITA	BEL (WA)	Album
"Smeraldo"	2012	—	80	L'amore è una cosa semplice
"Bacio di Giuda" (Shiva featuring Tiziano Ferro)	2026	13	—	Vangelo

== Other appearances ==
List of other album appearances
Contribution	Year	Album
"Pensieri al tramonto" (Luca Carboni featuring Tiziano Ferro)	2006	...le band si sciolgono
"Non me lo so spiegare" (Live) (Laura Pausini featuring Tiziano Ferro)	2007	San Siro 2007
"Arrivederci Roma" (Dean Martin featuring Tiziano Ferro)	2007	Forever Cool
"L'amore e basta!" (Giusy Ferreri featuring Tiziano Ferro) "El amor y basta!" (Giusy Ferreri featuring Tiziano Ferro)	2008	Gaetana
"Amiga" (Miguel Bosé featuring Tiziano Ferro)	2012	Papitwo
"La differenza tra me e te" (Live)	2012	Italia Loves Emilia - Il concerto
"Indietro" (Live)	2012	Italia Loves Emilia - Il concerto
"Sere nere" (Live)	2012	Italia Loves Emilia - Il concerto
"Il tuo boy è preso male" (Baby K featuring Tiziano Ferro)	2013	Una seria
"Persone silenziose" (Luca Carboni featuring Tiziano Ferro)	2013	Fisico & politico
"E scopro cos'è la felicità" (Elisa featuring Tiziano Ferro)	2013	L'anima vola

== Music videos ==
List of music videos, showing year released and director
Title	Year	Director(s)
"Xdono" "Perdona"	2001	Matteo Pellegrini
"L'olimpiade" "La olimpiada"	2001	
"Imbranato" "Alucinado"	2002	Matteo Pellegrini
"Rosso relativo" (Original and International version) "Rojo relativo"	2002	Paolo Monico
"Le cose che non dici" "Las cosas que no dices"	2002	Cosimo Alemà
"Xverso" "Un Pour Toi Un Pour Moi" "Perverso"	2003	Paolo Monico
"Sere nere" "Tardes negras"	2003	Paolo Monico
"Non me lo so spiegare" "No me lo puedo explicar"	2004	Paolo Monico
"Ti voglio bene" "Desde mañana no lo sé"	2004	Maki Gherzi
"Universal Prayer" (with Jamelia)	2004	
"Stop! Dimentica" "Stop! Olvídate"	2006	Antti Jokinen
"Ed ero contentissimo" (Original and Save Tiziano version) "Y estaba contentísimo" (Original and Save Tiziano version)	2006	Paolo Monico
"Mi credo" (featuring Pepe Aguilar)	2006	
"Ti scatterò una foto" "Te tomaré una foto"	2007	Luis Prieto
"Non me lo so spiegare" (Original and Backstage version, with Laura Pausini) "No me lo puedo explicar" (with Laura Pausini)	2007	Gaetano Morbioli
"E Raffaella è mia" "Y Raffaella es mía"	2007	Gaetano Morbioli
"E fuori è buio" "Y está oscuro"	2007	Cosimo Alemà
"Sogni risplendono" (with Linea 77)	2008	Francesco Fei
"Alla mia età" "A mi edad"	2008	Gaetano Morbioli
"Il regalo più grande" "El regalo más grande" (featuring Anahí and Dulce María of RBD / Amaia Montero)	2009	Gaetano Morbioli
"Indietro" "Breathe Gentle" (featuring Kelly Rowland)	2009	Gaetano Morbioli
"Domani 21/04.2009" (With Artisti Uniti per l'Abruzzo)	2009	Ambrogio Lo Giudice
"Il sole esiste per tutti"	2009	Christian Biondani
"Scivoli di nuovo"	2009	Marco Gentile
"Each Tear" (with Mary J. Blige)	2010	Marcus Raboy
"La differenza tra me e te" "La diferencia entre tú y yo"	2011	Gaetano Morbioli
"L'ultima notte al mondo" "La última noche del mundo"	2012	Gaetano Morbioli
"Hai delle isole negli occhi"	2012	Fabio Jansen
"El amor es una cosa simple" (featuring Malú)	2012	Fabio Jansen
"Per dirti ciao!"	2012	Saku
"Troppo buono" "Demasiado bueno"	2012	Gaetano Morbioli
"A muso duro" (With Italia Loves Emilia)	2012	Riccardo Guernieri
"L'amore è una cosa semplice"	2012	Fabio Jansen
"Killer" (with Baby K)	2013	Gaetano Morbioli
"La fine"	2013	Gaetano Morbioli
"Sei sola" (with Baby K)	2013	Gaetano Morbioli
"Persone silenziose" (with Luca Carboni)	2013	Fabio Jansen
"Senza scappare mai più" "No escaparé nunca más"	2014	Gaetano Morbioli
"Incanto" "Encanto" (featuring Pablo López)	2015	Gaetano Morbioli
"Lo stadio" "Un estadio"	2015	Gaetano Morbioli
"Il vento"	2015	Gaetano Morbioli
"Senza un posto nel mondo" (with Marracash)	2015	Jacopo Rondinelli
"Potremmo ritornare"	2016	Gaetano Morbioli
"Il conforto" (con Carmen Consoli)/"Il conforto (LA-CT Version)" (con Carmen Consoli)	2017	Gaetano Morbioli
"Lento/Veloce"	2017	Gaetano Morbioli
"Valore assoluto""	2017	Federico Merlo
"Il mestiere della vita"	2017	Gaetano Morbioli
"'Solo' è solo una parola"	2018	Gaetano Morbioli
"Per me è importante" (with Tiromancino)	2019	Marco Pavone
"Buona (cattiva) sorte"/"Buena (mala) suerte"	2019	Gaetano Morbioli
"Accetto miracoli"	2019	Gaetano Morbioli
"Acepto milagros" (with Ana Guerra)	2019	Tommaso Cardile e Sebastiano Tomada
"In mezzo a questo inverno"	2019	Tommaso Cardile e Sebastiano Tomada
"Amici per errore"	2020	Gianluca Grandinetti
"Balla per me" (with Jovanotti)	2020	Marco Gentile and Giorgio Testi
"Rimmel (Studio Performance)"	2020	Giorgio Testi
"E ti vengo a cercare"	2020	Tommaso Cardile e Sebastiano Tomada
"Casa a Natale"	2020	Drew Stewart
"Solo lei ha quel che voglio 2021" (with Sottotono, Gué Pequeno and Marracash)	2021	Trilathera
"La vita splendida"	2022	Guido Gallo Fabris
"La prima festa del papà"	2022	Dario Garegnani
"Rotonda" (with Thasup)	2023	Erika De Nicola
"Addio mio amore"/"Adiós mi amor"	2023	Walid Azami
"Destinazione mare"	2023	Walid Azami
"Abbiamo vinto già" (with J-Ax)	2023	Sebastiano Tomada
"Feeling" (with Elodie)	2024	Luca and Alessandro Morelli
"Cuore rotto"	2025	Cosimo Alemà
"Fingo&spingo"	2025	Fabrizio Conte
"Fingo&spingo" (alternative video)	2025	Giulio Rosati
"Sono un grande"	2026	Cosimo Alemà

== Writing credits ==
List of songs written for other artists
Song	Year	Artist	Album
"Entro il 23" (Written by Tiziano Ferro and Roberto Casalino)	2002	Mp2	Illogico
"Dove il mondo racconta segreti" (Written by Tiziano Ferro and Michele Zarrillo)	2003	Michele Zarrillo	LiberoSentire
"A chi mi dice" (Written by Lars Halvor Jensen, Martin Michael Larsson, Lee Ryan and Tiziano Ferro)	2004	Blue	Guilty (Italian Edition)
"E va be'" (Written by Tiziano Ferro and Roberto Casalino)	2005	Syria	Non è peccato
"Amaro amarti" (Written by Tiziano Ferro)	2007	Iva Zanicchi	Colori d'amore
"Non ti scordar mai di me" / "Nunca te olvides de mi" (Written by Tiziano Ferro and Roberto Casalino)	2008	Giusy Ferreri	Non ti scordar mai di me
"Stai fermo lì" / "Parado ahì" (Written by Tiziano Ferro and Roberto Casalino)	2008	Giusy Ferreri	Gaetana
"Aria di vita" / "Aire de vida" (Written by Tiziano Ferro)	2008	Giusy Ferreri	Gaetana
"Passione positiva" / "Pasion positiva" (Written by Tiziano Ferro and Roberto Casalino)	2008	Giusy Ferreri	Gaetana
"Il sapore di un altro no" / "La amargura de otro no" (Written by Tiziano Ferro and Sergio Cammariere)	2008	Giusy Ferreri	Gaetana
"La scala (The Ladder)" (Written by Linda Perry, adapted by Tiziano Ferro)	2008	Giusy Ferreri	Gaetana
"Cuore assente (The La La Song)" (Written by Linda Perry, adapted by Tiziano Ferro)	2008	Giusy Ferreri	Gaetana
"Guarda l'alba" (Written by Tiziano Ferro and Carmen Consoli)	2010	Carmen Consoli	Per niente stanca
"Nata ieri" (Written by Tiziano Ferro)	2012	Alice	Samsara
"Nostrastoria" (Written by Tiziano Ferro and Gianna Nannini)	2013	Gianna Nannini	Inno
"Tra le mani un cuore (A Heart in My Hands)" (Written by Tiziano Ferro, Filippo Neviani, Giulia Anania, and Marta Venturini)	2025	Massimo Ranieri	Sanremo Music Festival 2025
