= Stadi 26 Tour =

2026 concert tour by Tiziano Ferro

- Tour by Tiziano Ferro
- Italian promotional poster
- Associated album: Sono un grande (2025)
- Start date: 30 May 2026
- End date: 12 July 2026
- No. of shows: 12 in Italy

Tiziano Ferro concert chronology
- TZN Tour 2023; Stadi 26 Tour 2026

The Stadi 26 Tour is a 2026 concert tour by Italian singer-songwriter Tiziano Ferro in support of his ninth album, Sono un grande (2025). The tour begins on 30 May 2026 at Stadio Guido Teghil in Lignano Sabbiadoro, Italy, and will end on 12 July 2026 at Stadio San Filippo in Messina, Italy.

Ferro announced a summer 2026 Italian stadium tour, the Stadi 26 Tour, on 15 September 2025. Having previously released the single "Cuore rotto" ("Broken heart") on 5 September 2025, Ferro announced his new album, Sono un grande, on 24 September 2025. It was released on 24 October 2025.

== Band ==
Music director Luca Scarpa led a six-musician band:

- Davide Tagliapietra: Guitar
- Corey Sanchez: Guitar
- Timothy Lefebvre: Bass
- Gary Novak: Drums
- Gianluca Ballarin: Keyboard
- Alessandro Orefice: Piano

== Setlist ==
1. "Sono un grande"
2. "Cuore rotto"
3. "Fingo&spingo"
4. "Accetto miracoli"
5. "La differenza tra me e te"
6. "L'olimpiade"
7. "Xxdono" (with Lazza, only on 6 June)
8. "Il regalo più grande"
9. "Ti scatterò una foto"
10. "Hai delle isole negli occhi"
11. "Sere nere"
12. "Non me lo so spiegare"
13. "Ti sognai" (with Ariete, only on 28 June)
14. "Indietro" (absent on 7 June)
15. "L'ultima notte al mondo"
16. "L'amore è una cosa semplice"
17. "Il sole esiste per tutti"
18. "Destinazione mare"
19. "Balla per me"
20. "La vita splendida" (absent on several dates)
21. "Ed ero contentissimo" (absent on 28 June)
22. "Potremmo ritornare"
23. "Il conforto"
24. "Stop! Dimentica"
25. "Incanto"
26. "Imbranato"
27. "Superstar" (with Giorgia, only on 27 June)
28. "E fuori è buio"
29. "La fine"
30. "E Raffaella è mia"
31. "Alla mia età"
32. "Per dirti ciao!"
33. "Rosso relativo"
34. "Lo stadio"
35. "Xdono"

== Tour dates ==
Date	City	Country	Venue	Guest(s) and duets
30 May 2026	Lignano Sabbiadoro	Italy	Stadio Guido Teghil	—N/a
6 June 2026	Milan	Italy	Stadio Giuseppe Meazza di San Siro	Lazza: "Xxdono"
7 June 2026	Milan	Italy	Stadio Giuseppe Meazza di San Siro	Ditonellapiaga: "Xxverso", "Che fastidio!"
10 June 2026	Turin	Italy	Juventus Stadium	—N/a
14 June 2026	Bologna	Italy	Stadio Renato Dall'Ara	Elettra Lamborghini: "E Raffaella è mia", "Voilà"
18 June 2026	Padua	Italy	Stadio Euganeo	—N/a
23 June 2026	Naples	Italy	Stadio Diego Armando Maradona	Sal Da Vinci: "Il regalo più grande", "Per sempre sì"
27 June 2026	Rome	Italy	Stadio Olimpico	Achille Lauro: "Non me lo so spiegare", "Incoscienti giovani" Giorgia: "Superstar"
28 June 2026	Rome	Italy	Stadio Olimpico	Ariete: "Ti sognai" Michele Zarrillo: "E fuori è buio", "Cinque giorni"
3 July 2026	Ancona	Italy	Stadio del Conero	—N/a
8 July 2026	Bari	Italy	Stadio San Nicola	Serena Brancale: "Non me lo so spiegare", "Anema e core"
12 July 2026	Messina	Italy	Stadio San Filippo	—N/a
