= TZN Tour 2023 =

2023 concert tour by Tiziano Ferro

- Tour by Tiziano Ferro
- Italian promotional poster
- Associated album: Accetto miracoli (2019); Il mondo è nostro (2022)
- Start date: 7 June 2023
- End date: 16 July 2023
- No. of shows: 15 in Italy

Tiziano Ferro concert chronology
- Il mestiere della vita Tour 2017; TZN Tour 2023; Stadi 26 Tour 2026

The TZN Tour 2023 was a concert tour by Italian singer-songwriter Tiziano Ferro in support of his seventh and eight albums, Accetto miracoli (2019) and Il mondo è nostro (2022). The tour began on 7 June 2023 at Stadio Guido Teghil in Lignano Sabbiadoro, Italy, and ended on 16 July 2023 at Forte Arena in Santa Margherita di Pula, Italy.

Ferro announced a tour for Accetto miracoli on Facebook on 3 June 2019, with concert dates in Italy from 30 May through 15 July 2020. 75,000 pre-sale tickets were sold within the first 24 hours. Ten European concert dates were announced on 20 November 2019. The tour was subsequently postponed due to the COVID-19 pandemic in Italy, with new Italian concert dates announced for June and July 2021. This slate of concerts was also canceled. In January 2022, Ferro announced a new album, Il mondo è nostro, to be released in November 2022 and followed by an Italian stadium tour in summer 2023. Tickets purchased for previously scheduled dates were valid for the new tour.

Alessandro Alicandri of TV Sorrisi e Canzoni described the TZN Tour 2023 as Ferro's best tour to date.

== Band ==
- Davide Tagliapietra: Guitarist
- Corey Sanchez: Guitarist
- Timothy Lefebvre: Bassist
- Luca Scarpa: Pianist, Keyboardist
- Gary Novak: Drummer
- Christian Rigano: Keyboards, Synthesizer, Rhodes piano, Hammond organ

== Setlist ==
The tour included Ferro's first live performances of songs from the albums Accetto miracoli and Il mondo è nostro, as well as a tribute to his late friend, singer Raffaella Carrà.

1. "Accetto miracoli"
2. "Buona (cattiva) sorte"
3. "La differenza tra me e te"
4. "Sere nere"
5. "Hai delle isole negli occhi"
6. "Il mondo è nostro"
7. "Ti scatterò una foto"
8. "Xdono"
9. "Imbranato"
10. "Indietro"
11. "Destinazione mare"
12. "L'amore è una cosa semplice"
13. "Ed ero contentissimo"
14. "E Raffaella è mia"
15. "Balla per me"
16. "Il regalo più grande"
17. "Addio mio amore"
18. "Alla mia età"
19. "L'ultima notte al mondo"
20. "Per dirti ciao!"
21. "Ti voglio bene"
22. "La prima festa del papà"
23. "La vita splendida"
24. "Stop! Dimentica"
25. "E fuori è buio"
26. "Potremmo ritornare"
27. "Incanto"
28. "Il conforto"
29. "La fine"
30. "Rosso relativo"
31. "Lo stadio"
32. "Non me lo so spiegare"
33. "Il sole esiste per tutti"

== Shows ==
=== Italian tour ===
Date	City	Country	Venue	Guest(s) and duets	Original dates
7 June 2023	Lignano Sabbiadoro	Italy	Stadio Guido Teghil	—N/a	30 May 2020, 6 June 2021
11 June 2023	Turin	Italy	Stadio Olimpico Grande Torino	—N/a	11 June 2020, 22 June 2021
15 June 2023	Milan	Italy	Stadio Giuseppe Meazza di San Siro	Carmen Consoli: "Il conforto"	5 June 2020, 15 June 2021
17 June 2023	Milan	Italy	Stadio Giuseppe Meazza di San Siro	Max Pezzali: "Ti scatterò una foto", "Come mai", "Nord sud ovest est"	6 June 2020, 18 June 2021
18 June 2023	Milan	Italy	Stadio Giuseppe Meazza di San Siro	Tananai: "E fuori è buio", "Tango"	8 June 2020, 19 June 2021
21 June 2023	Florence	Italy	Stadio Artemio Franchi	—N/a	17 June 2020, 9 June 2021
24 June 2023	Rome	Italy	Stadio Olimpico	Federico Zampaglione: "Per me è importante"	15 July 2020, 9 July 2021
25 June 2023	Rome	Italy	Stadio Olimpico	Roberto Casalino: "Destinazione mare" Jovanotti: "Penso positivo", "Balla per me"	16 July 2020, 10 July 2021
28 June 2023	Naples	Italy	Stadio Diego Armando Maradona	Massimo Ranieri: "Perdere l'amore", "Je so' pazzo"	24 June 2020, 26 June 2021
1 July 2023	Bari	Italy	Stadio San Nicola	Giuliano Sangiorgi: "Non me lo so spiegare", "Estate"	3 July 2020, 29 July 2021
4 July 2023	Messina	Italy	Stadio San Filippo	Angelina Mango: "Indietro", "Ci pensiamo domani"	27 June 20, 3 July 2021; Catania, Stadio Angelo Massimino
8 July 2023	Ancona	Italy	Stadio del Conero	—N/a	20 June 2020, 6 July 2021
11 July 2023	Bologna	Italy	Stadio Renato Dall'Ara	Paola & Chiara: "Vamos a bailar" Laura Pausini: "Non me lo so spiegare"	7 July 2020, 12 June 2021; Modena, Stadio Alberto Braglia
14 July 2023	Padua	Italy	Stadio Euganeo	—N/a	14 June 2020, 14 July 2021
16 July 2023	Santa Margherita di Pula	Italy	Forte Arena	—N/a	—N/a
Canceled	Cagliari	Italy	Fiera di Cagliari	—N/a	11 July 2020

=== European tour ===
Date	City	Country	Venue	Original dates
Canceled	Brussels	Belgium	Forest National	11 November 2020
Canceled	Zurich	Switzerland	Samsung Hall	14 November 2020
Canceled	Frankfurt	Germany	Alte Oper	30 November 2020
Canceled	London	United Kingdom	Eventim Apollo	2 December 2020
Canceled	Luxembourg City	Luxembourg	Rockhal	5 December 2020
Canceled	Paris	France	Le Trianon	6 December 2020
Canceled	Munich	Germany	Gasteig	8 December 2020
Canceled	Lausanne	Switzerland	Salle Metropole	11 December 2020
Canceled	Barcelona	Spain	Auditorio de Barcelona	13 December 2020
Canceled	Madrid	Spain	Palacio Municipal de Congresos	14 December 2020
