= Il mestiere della vita Tour 2017 =

2017 concert tour by Tiziano Ferro

- Tour by Tiziano Ferro
- Italian promotional poster
- Associated album: Il mestiere della vita
- Start date: 11 June 2017
- End date: 15 July 2017
- Legs: 1
- No. of shows: 13 in Italy; 13 Total

Tiziano Ferro concert chronology
- Lo stadio Tour 2015; Il mestiere della vita Tour 2017; TZN Tour 2023

The Il mestiere della vita Tour 2017 is a concert tour by Italian singer-songwriter Tiziano Ferro in promotion of his sixth studio album Il mestiere della vita.

The tour was announced on October 6, 2016 through the official Facebook profile of the artist, while on December 1 a new double date will be announced in Rome. On January 30 a third date was announced in Milan, while on February 23 a new double date in Bari.

Due to this tour, Il mestiere della vita Tour 2017 in April 2018, the singer and composer won an Onstage Award for the best Italian tour.

== Band ==
- Davide Tagliapietra: Guitarist
- Luca Scarpa: Pianist
- Reggie Hamilton: Bassist
- Nicola Peruch: Keyboardist
- Alessandro De Crescenzo: Guitarist
- Andrea Fontana: Drummer

== Setlist ==
1. "Il mestiere della vita"
2. "Epic"
3. ""Solo" è solo una parola"
4. "L'amore è una cosa semplice"
5. "Valore assoluto"
6. "Il regalo più grande"
7. "R&B Medley: My Steelo, Hai delle isole negli occhi, Indietro""
8. "La differenza tra me e te"
9. "Ed ero contentissimo"
10. "Sere nere"
11. "Xdono"
12. "Encore"
13. "Medley Electro Dance: Il sole esiste per tutti, Senza scappare mai più, E Raffaella è mia"
14. "Ti scatterò una foto"
15. "Acoustic Medley: Imbranato, Troppo buono, E fuori è buio (only guitar)"
16. "Per dirti ciao!"
17. "La fine"
18. "Encore"
19. "Lento/Veloce"
20. "Rosso relativo"
21. "Stop! Dimentica"
22. "Xverso"
23. "Alla mia età"
24. "L'ultima notte al mondo"
25. "Encore": Mi sono innamorato di te (only piano)
26. "Incanto"
27. "Lo stadio"
28. "Il conforto"
29. "Non me lo so spiegare"
30. "Potremmo ritornare"

== Tour dates ==
Date	City	Country	Venue
Italy
11 June 2017	Lignano Sabbiadoro	Italy	Stadio Guido Teghil
16 June 2017	Milan	Italy	San Siro
17 June 2017	Milan	Italy	San Siro
19 June 2017	Milan	Italy	San Siro
21 June 2017	Turin	Italy	Stadio Olimpico di Torino
24 June 2017	Bologna	Italy	Stadio Renato Dall'Ara
28 June 2017	Rome	Italy	Stadio Olimpico
30 June 2017	Rome	Italy	Stadio Olimpico
4 July 2017	Bari	Italy	Stadio della Vittoria
5 July 2017	Bari	Italy	Stadio della Vittoria
8 July 2017	Messina	Italy	Stadio San Filippo
12 July 2017	Salerno	Italy	Stadio Arechi
15 July 2017	Florence	Italy	Stadio Artemio Franchi
