= List of awards and nominations received by Tiziano Ferro =

Tiziano Ferro awards and nominations
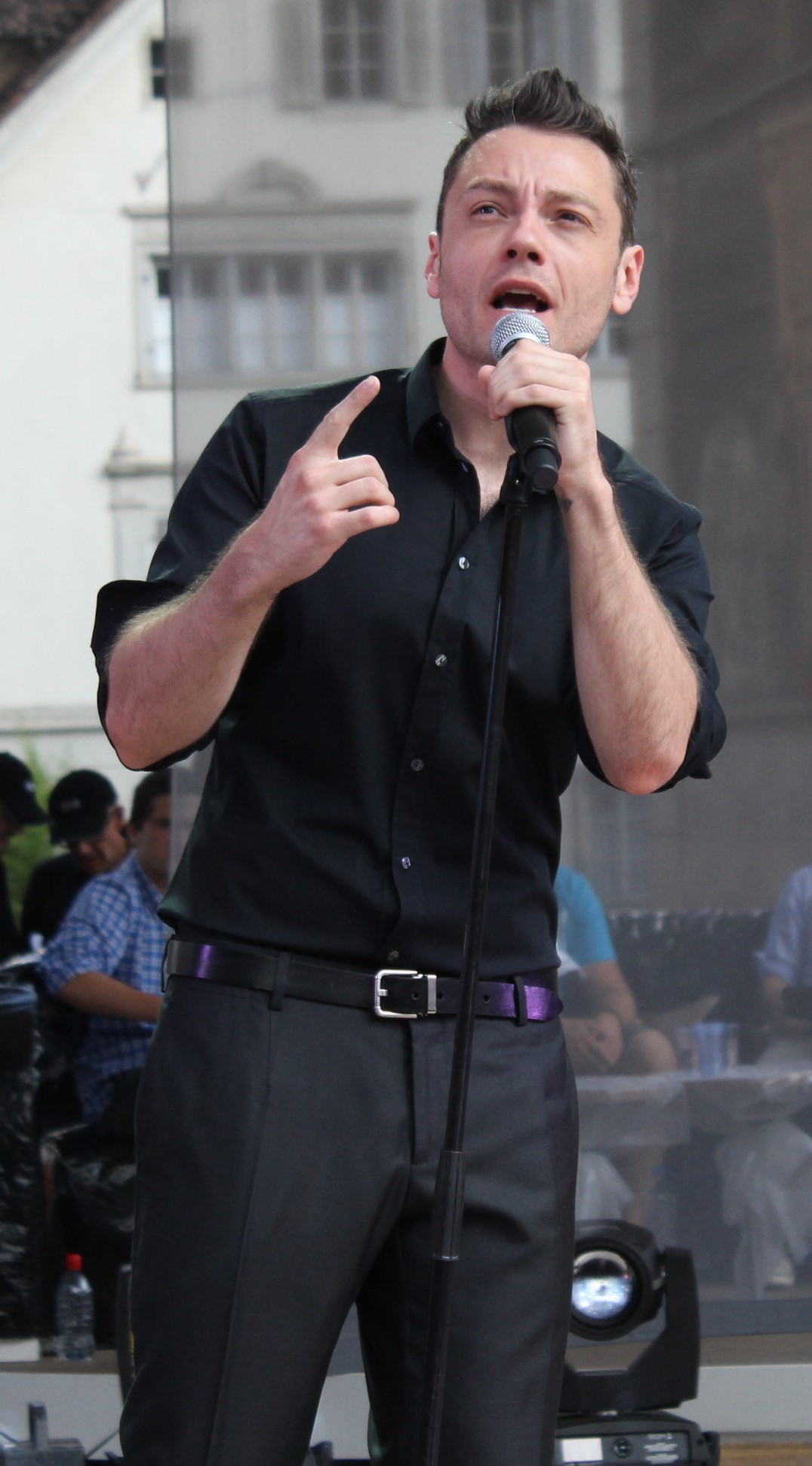
- Tiziano Ferro in 2012
Awards and nominations
Award	Wins	Nominations
Billboard Latin Music Awards	1	2
Grammy Awards	1	1
Italian Music Awards	0	3
Latin Grammy Awards	2	3
Premios Juventud	0	1
Premios Oye!	1	2
Rockol Awards	1	7
TIM Music Awards	7	9

Totals (Note: Certain award groups do not simply award one winner. They acknowledge several different recipients, have runners-up, and have third place. Since this is a specific recognition and is different from losing an award, runner-up mentions are considered wins in this award tally. For simplification and to avoid errors, each award in this list has been presumed to have had a prior nomination.)
- Wins: 47
- Nominations: 96

Italian singer-songwriter and producer Tiziano Ferro is the recipient of various national awards and nominations. Ferro has released a Spanish language version of each of his albums and has also sung in English, Portuguese, and French, aside from his native Italian.

Ferro's debut album, Rosso relativo, received nominations and awards including Billboard Latin Music Awards, France's NRJ Music Awards, Italian Music Awards and the Latin Grammy Awards for Best New Artist in 2004. Over the course of his career, he was nominated for various Rockol Awards, and TIM Music Awards, as well World Music Awards and MTV Europe Music Awards for Best Italian Act among others.

Ferro won two Latin Grammy Awards and one Grammy Award for his contributions to albums by Laura Pausini in 2007 and Chris Botti in 2012.

He was named the best Revelation Artist of the 2000-2010 decade in a poll conducted by Rockol and Fnac.

== Awards and nominations ==
Award/organization (Note: Charts are not included, unless they are explicitly described as "awards" or specific trophies are given.)	Year	Nominee/work	Category	Result	Ref.
Billboard Latin Music Awards	2004	"Alucinado"	Latin Pop Airplay Track Of The Year, New Artist	Won	
Billboard Latin Music Awards	2004	Rojo relativo	Latin Pop Album of the Year, New Artist	Nominated	
BMI Latin Awards	2004	"Alucinado"	Song List	Won	
BMI Latin Awards	2006	"Tardes negras"	Winning-Songs	Won	
Cadena Dial	2004	Tiziano Ferro	Dial Award	Won	
Cadena Dial	2010	Tiziano Ferro	Dial Award	Won	
Cadena Dial	2015	Tiziano Ferro	Dial Award	Won	
Diversity Media Awards	2016	Tiziano Ferro	Personality of the Year	Nominated	
Diversity Media Awards	2021	Ferro	Best Italian Film	Won	
European Border Breakers Award	2004	Tiziano Ferro (Rosso relativo)	EBBA Award	Won	
Festivalbar	2002	Tiziano Ferro	Best Italian Newcomer	Won	
Festival di San Marino	2002	Tiziano Ferro	Best Male Artist	Won	
Festival di San Marino	2002	Rosso relativo	Best Album	Won	
Giffoni Film Festival	2007	Tiziano Ferro	Italian Personality — Music	Won	
Golden Tapir	2015	Lo stadio Tour 2015	Tapiro d'Oro	Won	
Grammy Awards	2012	Impressions (album: Chris Botti), "Per te (For You)" (songwriter)	Best Pop Instrumental Album	Won	
Grammy Awards	2019	Sì (album: Andrea Bocelli), "Amo soltanto te" (songwriter)	Best Traditional Pop Vocal Album	Nominated	
Italian Music Awards	2002	Tiziano Ferro	Best Male Artist	Nominated	
Italian Music Awards	2002	Rosso relativo	Best Album	Nominated	
Italian Music Awards	2002	"Rosso relativo"	Best Single	Nominated	
Latin Grammy Awards	2003	Tiziano Ferro	Best New Artist	Nominated	
Latin Grammy Awards	2007	Io Canto (album: Laura Pausini), "No me lo puedo explicar" (songwriter)	Best Female Pop Vocal Album	Won	
Latin Grammy Awards	2007	Io Canto (album: Laura Pausini), "No me lo puedo explicar" (performer, with Laura Pausini)	Best Female Pop Vocal Album	Won	
Latin Grammy Awards	2013	Papitwo (album: Miguel Bosé), "Amiga" (performers, Miguel Bosé and Tiziano Ferro)	Best Contemporary Pop Album	Nominated	
Latin Grammy Awards	2013	Papitwo (album: Miguel Bosé), "Amiga" (performers, Miguel Bosé and Tiziano Ferro)	Album of the Year	Nominated	
Levi's Onstage Awards	2012	Tiziano Ferro	Artist of the Year	Won	
Levi's Onstage Awards	2012	L'amore è una cosa semplice Tour 2012	Best Tour	Won	
Levi's Onstage Awards	2018	Tiziano Ferro	Male Artist of the Year	Won	
Levi's Onstage Awards	2018	Il mestiere della vita Tour 2017	Best Italian Tour	Won	
Levi's Onstage Awards	2018	"Lento/Veloce"	Best Live Song	Won	
Lo Nuestro Awards	2004	Tiziano Ferro	Pop New Artist	Nominated	
Lo Nuestro Awards	2004	Rojo relativo	Pop Album of the Year	Nominated	
Los Angeles Italia Film Festival	2018	Tiziano Ferro	L'Italian Excellence Award	Honoree	
Los 40 Principales Awards	2009	"El Regalo más Grande"	Best International Song	Nominated	
Meeting delle etichette indipendenti (MEI)	2088	"Ti scatterò una foto"	SIAE Award: Best-Selling Digital Song	Won	
Monza Italian Music Awards (MIMA)	2018	Tiziano Ferro	Male Artist of the Year	Won	
Monza Italian Music Awards (MIMA)	2018	Tiziano Ferro	Spotify Award	Nominated	
Monza Italian Music Awards (MIMA)	2018	Tiziano Ferro	Concert of the Year	Nominated	
MTV Europe Music Awards	2002	Tiziano Ferro	Best Italian Act	Nominated	
MTV Europe Music Awards	2004	Tiziano Ferro	Best Italian Act	Won	
MTV Europe Music Awards	2006	Tiziano Ferro	Best Italian Act	Nominated	
MTV Europe Music Awards	2009	Tiziano Ferro	Best Italian Act	Nominated	
MTV Europe Music Awards	2015	Tiziano Ferro	Best Italian Act	Nominated	
MTV Europe Music Awards	2017	Tiziano Ferro	Best Italian Act	Nominated	
MTV Italian Music Awards (a.k.a. TRL Awards)	2007	Tiziano Ferro	Male of the Year	Won	
MTV Italian Music Awards (a.k.a. TRL Awards)	2007	Tiziano Ferro	Best Fills Seats	Won	
MTV Italian Music Awards (a.k.a. TRL Awards)	2008	Tiziano Ferro	Man of the Year	Nominated	
MTV Italian Music Awards (a.k.a. TRL Awards)	2009	Tiziano Ferro	Man of the Year	Nominated	
MTV Italian Music Awards (a.k.a. TRL Awards)	2010	Tiziano Ferro	Man of the Year	Nominated	
MTV Italian Music Awards (a.k.a. TRL Awards)	2012	Tiziano Ferro	Super Man Award	Nominated	
MTV Italian Music Awards (a.k.a. TRL Awards)	2015	"Senza scappare mai più"	Best Video	Won	
MTV Italian Music Awards (a.k.a. TRL Awards)	2016	Tiziano Ferro	Best Italian Male	Nominated	
MTV Video Music Awards Latin America	2004	Tiziano Ferro	Best Solo/Performer Artist	Nominated	
MTV Video Music Awards Latin America	2005	Tiziano Ferro	Best Male Artist	Nominated	
MTV Video Music Awards Latin America	2006	Tiziano Ferro	Best Male Artist	Nominated	
Nickelodeon Italia Kids' Choice Awards	2006	Tiziano Ferro	Best Italian Singer	Won	
Nickelodeon Italia Kids' Choice Awards	2007	Tiziano Ferro	Best Italian Singer	Nominated	
Nickelodeon Italia Kids' Choice Awards	2008	Tiziano Ferro	Best Male Singer	Won	
NRJ Music Awards	2003	Tiziano Ferro	International Male Artist of the Year	Nominated	
NRJ Music Awards	2003	Rosso relativo	International Album of the Year	Nominated	
Orgullosamente Latino Award	2004	111 Centoundici	Latin Album of the Year	Nominated	
Orgullosamente Latino Award	2007	Tiziano Ferro	Latin Male Singer	Nominated	
Orgullosamente Latino Award	2008	Tiziano Ferro	Latin Male Singer	Nominated	
Premio italiano della musica (PIM)	2002	Tiziano Ferro	Best New Artist	Won	
Premio italiano della musica (PIM)	2002	"Xdono"	Best Song of the Year	Nominated	
Premio Lunezia	2009	Tiziano Ferro	Lunezia Pop Award	Won	
Premio Videoclip Italiano (PVI)	2006	"Stop! Dimentica"	Best Video by a Male Artist	Nominated	
Premio Videoclip Italiano (PVI)	2007	"E Raffaella è mia"	Best Video by a Male Artist	Nominated	
Premio Videoclip Italiano (PVI)	2009	"Il regalo più grande"	Best Video by a Male Artist	Won	
Premio Videoclip Italiano (PVI)	2012	"L'ultima notte al mondo"	Best Video by a Male Artist	Won	
Premio Videoclip Italiano (PVI)	2024	"R()t()nda" (with Thasup)	Best Video by a Male Artist	Won	
Premios Amigo	2002	Tiziano Ferro	Latin Revelation Artist of the Year	Nominated	
Premios Juventud	2009	"El Regalo Más Grande" (with Anahí and Dulce María)	The Perfect Combination	Nominated	
Premios Oye!	2003	Tiziano Ferro	Best Spanish-Language Male Artist	Nominated	
Premios Oye!	2004	Tiziano Ferro	Best Spanish-Language Male Artist	Won	
Rockol Awards	2012	"Hai delle isole negli occhi"	Best Italian Single	Nominated	
Rockol Awards	2012	L'amore è una cosa semplice Tour 2012	Best Concert/Festival	Nominated	
Rockol Awards	2012	"L'ultima notte al mondo"	Best Italian Music Video	Nominated	
Rockol Awards	2013	"Killer" (Baby featuring Tiziano Ferro)	Best Italian Single	Nominated	
Rockol Awards	2013	"Killer" (Baby featuring Tiziano Ferro)	Best Italian Music Video	Nominated	
Rockol Awards	2017	Tiziano Ferro	Gold TicketOne — Italian Artist	Won	
Rockol Awards	2023	Il mondo è nostro	Best Italian Album	Nominated	
Sound&Lite Magazine	2012	Tiziano Ferro	Best Show	Won	
TIM Music Awards (Note: The award have had various previous names, including Wind Music Awards or Seat Music Awards)	2007	Tiziano Ferro	Best Performer	Won	
TIM Music Awards	2009	Tiziano Ferro	Best Performer	Won	
TIM Music Awards	2010	Alla mia età Live in Rome	DVD Platinum Award	Won	
TIM Music Awards	2012	L'amore è una cosa semplice	Multiplatinum Award	Won	
TIM Music Awards	2013	Tiziano Ferro	Artist of the Year	Won	
TIM Music Awards	2015	TZN – The Best of Tiziano Ferro	Multiplatinum Award	Won	
TIM Music Awards	2016	Tiziano Ferro	Best Performer	Nominated	
TIM Music Awards	2016	"Lo stadio"	Best Anthem	Nominated	
TIM Music Awards	2016	Lo stadio Tour 2015	Best Tour	Won	
The Italian TV Festival (ITTV) (Note: Italian TV Festival or Filming Italy Los Angeles)	2021	Ferro	Best Documentary	Won	
World Music Awards	2009	Tiziano Ferro	Best-Selling Italian Artist	Won	
World Music Awards	2013	Tiziano Ferro	World's Best Male Artist	Nominated	
World Music Awards	2013	Tiziano Ferro	World's Best Entertainer	Nominated	
World Music Awards	2013	"La differenza tra me e te"	World's Best Video	Nominated	
World Music Awards	2014	Tiziano Ferro	World's Best Male Artist	Nominated	
World Music Awards	2014	Tiziano Ferro	World's Best Live Act	Nominated	
World Music Awards	2014	L'amore è una cosa semplice	World's Best Album	Nominated	
