= Lo stadio Tour 2015 =

2015 concert tour by Tiziano Ferro

- Tour by Tiziano Ferro
- Italian promotional poster
- Associated album: TZN – The Best of Tiziano Ferro
- Start date: 20 June 2015
- End date: 15 December 2015
- Legs: 2
- No. of shows: 24 in Italy; 5 in Europe; 29 total

Tiziano Ferro concert chronology
- L'amore è una cosa semplice Tour 2012; Lo stadio Tour 2015; Il mestiere della vita Tour 2017

The Lo stadio Tour 2015 is a concert tour by Italian singer-songwriter Tiziano Ferro in promotion of his first compilation album, TZN – The Best of Tiziano Ferro. The news of the tour was announced in October 2014 on the official Facebook profile of the singer. In just 24 hours, 50,000 tickets were sold.

== Band ==
- Davide Tagliapietra: Guitarist
- Luca Scarpa: Pianist
- Reggie Hamilton: Bassist
- Nicola Peruch: Keyboardist
- Tim Stewart: Guitarist
- Aaron Spears: Drummer

== Setlist ==
1. "Xdono"
2. "La differenza tra me e te"
3. "Sere nere"
4. "Troppo buono"
5. "Indietro"
6. "E fuori è buio"
7. "Imbranato"
8. "Il regalo più grande"
9. "Scivoli di nuovo"
10. "Il sole esiste per tutti"

Encore

11. "Senza scappare mai più"
12. "Stop! Dimentica"
13. "Xverso"
14. "L'olimpiade"
15. "Hai delle isole negli occhi"
16. "Ed ero contentissimo"
17. "L'amore è una cosa semplice"
18. "Ti scatterò una foto"
19. "Ti voglio bene"

Encore

20. "Le cose che non dici"
21. "E Raffaella è mia"
22. "Rosso relativo"
23. "L'ultima notte al mondo"
24. "Per dirti ciao!"

Encore Latina (instrumental)

25. "Alla mia età"
26. "La fine"
27. "Lo stadio"
28. "Non me lo so spiegare"
29. "Incanto"

== Tour dates ==
Date	City	Country	Venue
Italy (First Leg)
20 June 2015	Turin	Italy	Stadio Olimpico di Torino
23 June 2015	Florence	Italy	Stadio Artemio Franchi
26 June 2015	Rome	Italy	Stadio Olimpico
27 June 2015	Rome	Italy	Stadio Olimpico
1 July 2015	Bologna	Italy	Stadio Renato Dall'Ara
4 July 2015	Milan	Italy	San Siro
5 July 2015	Milan	Italy	San Siro
8 July 2015	Verona	Italy	Stadio Marcantonio Bentegodi
European Tour 2015 (Second Leg)
13 November 2015	Turin	Italy	PalaAlpitour
16 November 2015	Milan	Italy	Mediolanum Forum
16 November 2015	Milan	Italy	Mediolanum Forum
19 November 2015	Bologna	Italy	Unipol Arena
21 November 2015	Rome	Italy	PalaLottomatica
22 November 2015	Rome	Italy	PalaLottomatica
24 November 2015	Eboli	Italy	PalaSele
26 November 2015	Bari	Italy	PalaFlorio
28 November 2015	Acireale	Italy	PalaTupparello
29 November 2015	Acireale	Italy	PalaTupparello
2 December 2015	Montichiari	Italy	PalaGeorge
3 December 2015	Montichiari	Italy	PalaGeorge
5 December 2015	Zurich	Switzerland	Hallenstadion
6 December 2015	Geneva	Switzerland	SEG Geneva Arena
8 December 2015	Munich	Germany	Zenith
11 December 2015	Conegliano	Italy	Zoppas Arena
12 December 2015	Conegliano	Italy	Zoppas Arena
15 December 2015	Brussels	Belgium	Forest National
17 December 2015	Lugano	Switzerland	Pista della Resega
19 December 2015	Florence	Italy	Nelson Mandela Forum
20 December 2015	Florence	Italy	Nelson Mandela Forum
