= L'amore è una cosa semplice Tour 2012 =

2012 concert tour by Tiziano Ferro

- Tour by Tiziano Ferro
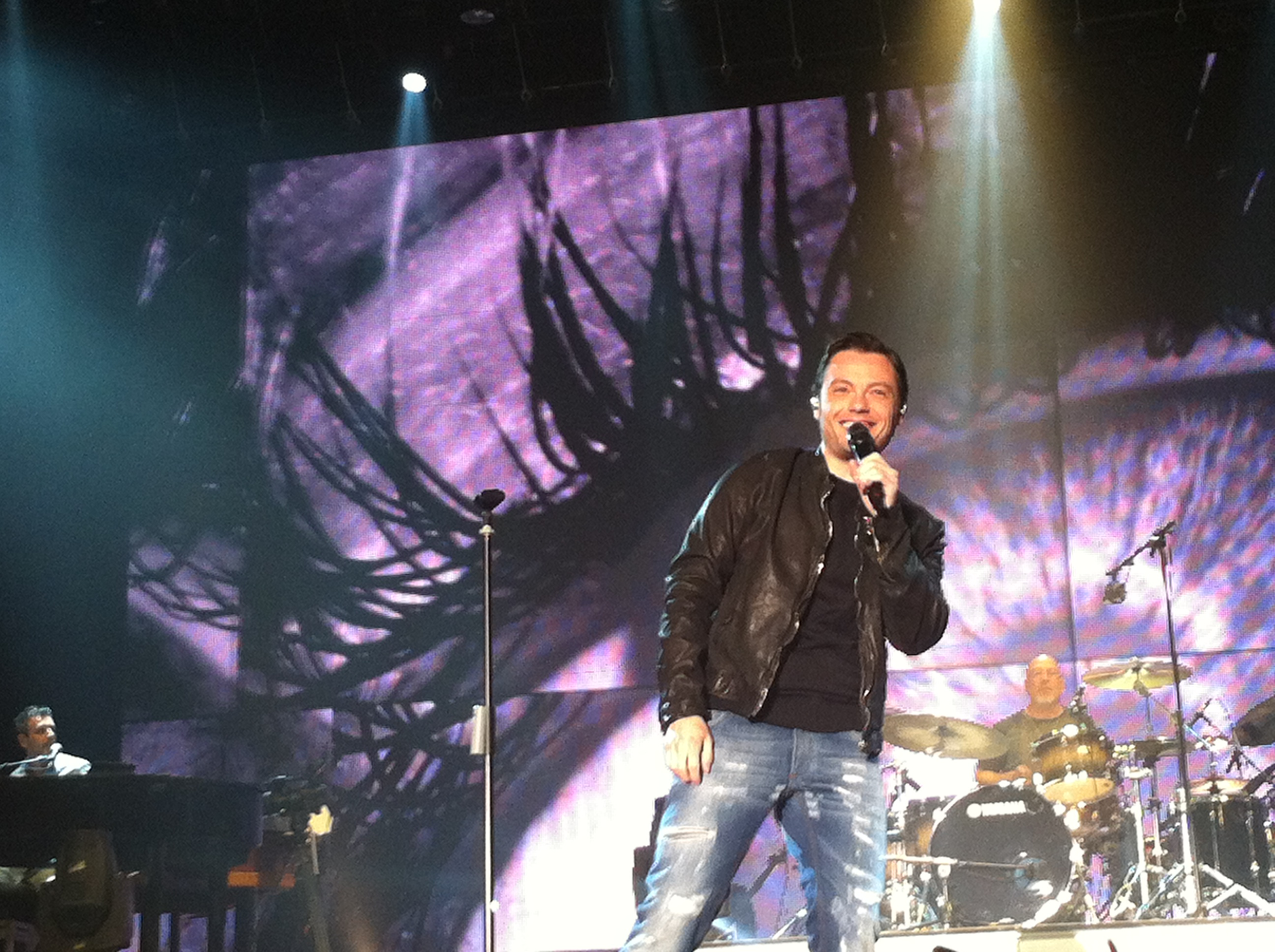
- Ferro performing in Florence on 25 April 2012
- Associated album: L'amore è una cosa semplice (2011)
- Start date: 10 April 2012
- End date: 11 August 2012
- Legs: 2
- No. of shows: 32; (29 in Italy); (1 in Switzerland); (1 in Belgium); (1 in Monaco)

Tiziano Ferro concert chronology
- Alla mia età Tour 2009–2010; L'amore è una cosa semplice Tour 2012; Lo stadio Tour 2015

The L'amore è una cosa semplice Tour 2012 was a concert tour by Italian singer-songwriter Tiziano Ferro in support of his 2011 album L'amore è una cosa semplice. The tour began on 10 April 2012 in Turin, Italy at the Palasport Olimpico, and ended on 11 August 2012 in Monte Carlo, Monaco at the Monte Carlo Sporting Club and Casino. It coincided with the 10-year anniversary of the start of Ferro's career.

Panorama called Ferro's performance "exceptional", praising his emotional connection with the audience and writing, "We found a new man, a very fresh voice, a desire to show a different face, freer, more surprising."

In December 2012, the L'amore è una cosa semplice Tour 2012 Tiziano Ferro won the Onstage Award for Best Tour of the Year, and a Rockol Award nomination for Best Concert/Festival.

== Band ==
- Christian Rigano: Keyboardist
- Luca Scarpa: Keyboardist
- Davide Tagliapietra: Guitarist
- Giorgio Secco: Guitarist
- Reggie Hamilton: Bassist
- Gareth Brown: Drummer
- Gary Novak: Drummer (only in the first leg of the tour)

== Setlist ==
The tour's setlist was as follows:

1. "L'amore è una cosa semplice"
2. "La differenza tra me e te"
3. "Hai delle isole negli occhi"
4. "Troppo buono"
5. "Smeraldo"
6. "Imbranato"
7. "Indietro"
8. "L'ultima notte al mondo"
9. "E fuori è buio"
10. "Sere nere"
11. "Stop! Dimentica"
12. "Xverso"
13. "E Raffaella è mia"
14. "Il regalo più grande"
15. "Alla mia età" (from 11 April in Turin)
16. "Il sole esiste per tutti"
17. "TVM (Ti voglio male)"
18. "Quiero vivir con vos"
19. "L'olimpiade"
20. "Roma, nun fa' la stupida stasera" (only in Rome)
21. "Ed ero contentissimo"
22. "Ti voglio bene"
23. "Xdono" (from 11 April in Turin)
24. "Rosso relativo"
25. "Non me lo so spiegare"
26. "Per dirti ciao!"
27. "Ti scatterò una foto"
28. "La fine" (except in Piazzola sul Brenta)

== Shows ==
First leg
Date	City	Country	Venue
10 April 2012	Turin	Italy	Palasport Olimpico
11 April 2012	Turin	Italy	Palasport Olimpico
11 April 2012	Bologna	Italy	Unipol Arena
13 April 2012	Eboli	Italy	PalaSele
17 April 2012	Acireale	Italy	PalaTupparello
18 April 2012	Acireale	Italy	PalaTupparello
21 April 2012	Caserta	Italy	PalaMaggiò
22 April 2012	Caserta	Italy	PalaMaggiò
25 April 2012	Florence	Italy	Nelson Mandela Forum
26 April 2012	Florence	Italy	Nelson Mandela Forum
13 April 2012	Pesaro	Italy	Adriatic Arena
2 May 2012	Milan	Italy	Mediolanum Forum
4 May 2012	Milan	Italy	Mediolanum Forum
6 May 2012	Milan	Italy	Mediolanum Forum
7 May 2012	Villorba	Italy	Palaverde
10 May 2012	Verona	Italy	Verona Arena
12 May 2012	Verona	Italy	Verona Arena
13 May 2012	Verona	Italy	Verona Arena
15 May 2012	Perugia	Italy	PalaEvangelisti
17 May 2012	Turin	Italy	PalaAlpitour
19 May 2012	Genoa	Italy	105 Stadium
20 May 2012	Genoa	Italy	105 Stadium
23 May 2012	Zürich	Switzerland	Hallenstadion
Second leg
Date	City	Country	Venue
30 June 2012	Bergamo	Italy	Fiera
4 July 2012	Brussels	Belgium	Forest National
8 July 2012	Piazzola sul Brenta	Italy	Anfiteatro Camerini
14 July 2012	Rome	Italy	Stadio Olimpico
18 July 2012	Cagliari	Italy	Fiera
22 July 2012	Bari	Italy	Stadio della Vittoria
25 July 2012	Palermo	Italy	Velodromo Paolo Borsellino
28 July 2012	Gela	Italy	Stadio Vincenzo Presti
11 August 2012	Monte Carlo	Monaco	Monte Carlo Sporting Club and Casino
