= Alla mia età Tour 2009–2010 =

2009–10 concert tour by Tiziano Ferro

- Tour by Tiziano Ferro
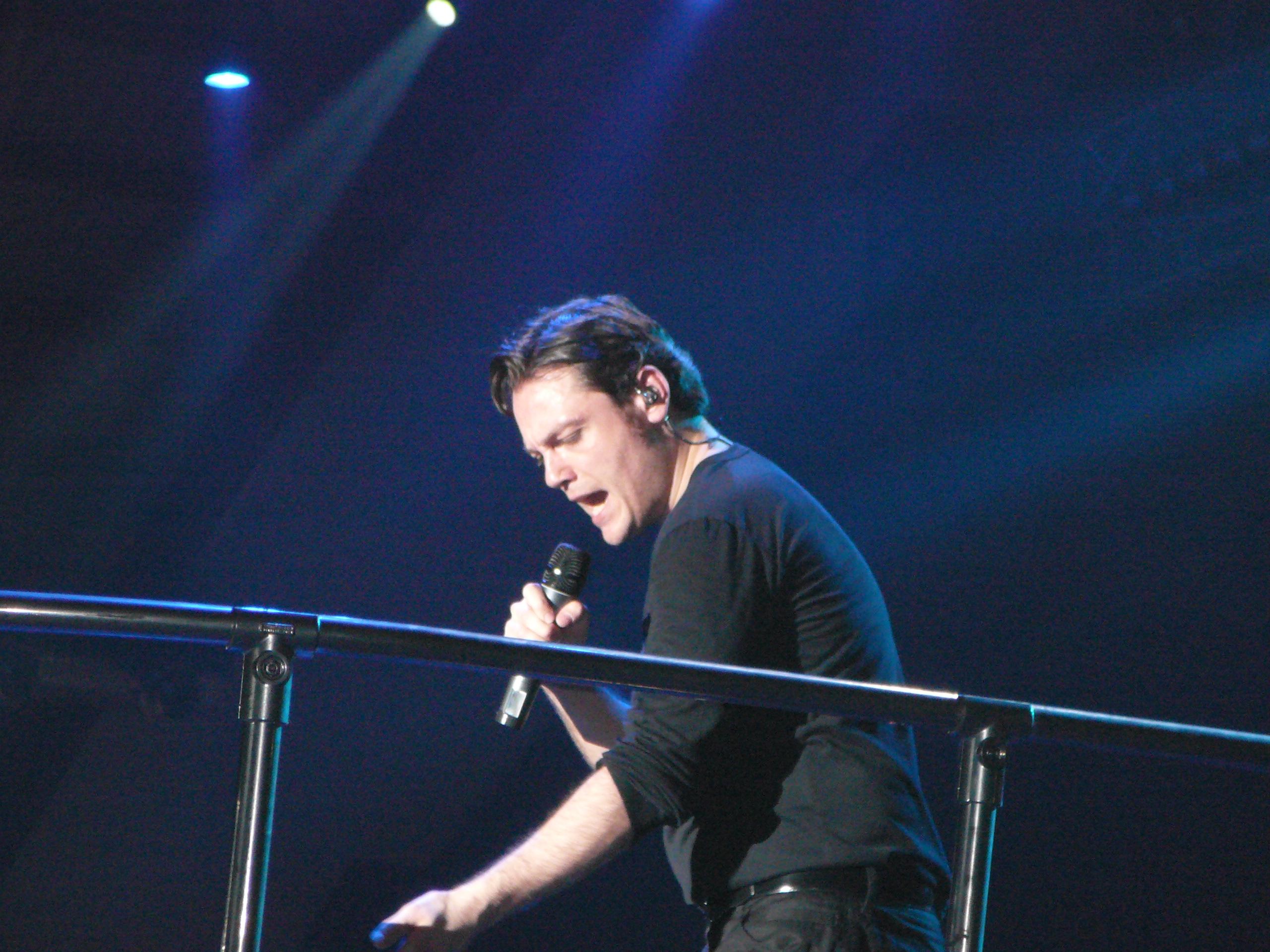
- Associated album: Alla mia età
- Start date: 18 April 2009
- End date: 20 May 2010
- Legs: 4
- No. of shows: 31 in Italy; 5 in Europe; 4 in North America; 40 Total

Tiziano Ferro concert chronology
- Nessuno è solo Tour 2007; Alla mia età Tour 2009–2010; L'amore è una cosa semplice Tour 2012

The Alla mia età Tour 2009–2010 is the fourth tour of the Italian singer Tiziano Ferro in support of his album Alla mia età.

At the end of the tour in Italy, on November 20 was released on DVD Alla mia età - Live in Rome , recorded during the two concerts given by Tiziano Ferro at Stadio Olimpico of Rome on 24 and 25 June 2009.

== Band ==
- Christian Rigano: Keyboardist
- Davide Tagliapietra: Guitarist
- Alessandro De Crescenzo: Guitarist
- Pino Saracini: Bassist
- Mylious Johnson: Drummer
- Leonardo d'Angilla: Percussionist

== Setlist ==
First Leg
1. "La tua vita non passerà"
2. "Stop! Dimentica"
3. "L'olimpiade"
4. "La paura non esiste"
5. "Imbranato"
6. "Indietro"
7. "Rosso relativo"
8. "Ed ero contentissimo"
9. "Ti voglio bene"
10. "La traversata dell'estate"
11. "Xdono"
12. "Sere nere"
13. "Domani 21/04.09"
14. "E fuori è buio"
15. "Fotografie della tua assenza"
16. "Per un po' sparirò/"Il tempo stesso"
17. "Xverso"
18. "E Raffaella è mia"
19. "Scivoli di nuovo"
20. "Ti scatterò una foto"
21. "Il sole esiste per tutti"
22. "Il regalo più grande"
23. "Alla mia età"
24. "Non me lo so spiegare"
Second Leg
1. "La tua vita non passerà"
2. "Stop! Dimentica"
3. "L'olimpiade"
4. "La paura non esiste"
5. "Imbranato"
6. "Indietro"
7. "Rosso relativo"
8. "Ed ero contentissimo"
9. "Ti voglio bene"
10. "La traversata dell'estate"
11. "Xdono"
12. "Sere nere"
13. "E fuori è buio"
14. "Per un po' sparirò/"Il tempo stesso"
15. "Assurdo pensare"
16. "Non ti scordar mai di me"
17. "Xverso"
18. "E Raffaella è mia"
19. "Scivoli di nuovo"
20. "Ti scatterò una foto"
21. "Il sole esiste per tutti"
22. "Il regalo più grande"
23. "Alla mia età"
24. "Non me lo so spiegare"

== Tour dates ==
Date	City	Country	Venue
Italy (First Leg)
18 April 2009	Rimini	Italy	105 Stadium
20 April 2009	Turin	Italy	Pala Alpitour
22 April 2009	Florence	Italy	Nelson Mandela Forum
24 April 2009	Conegliano	Italy	Zoppas Arena
26 April 2009	Padua	Italy	Arena Spettacoli Fiera
Europe
28 April 2009	Zürich	Switzerland	Hallenstadion
Italy
30 April 2009	Brescia	Italy	PalaBrescia
2 May 2009	Genoa	Italy	105 Stadium
4 May 2012	Milan	Italy	Mediolanum Forum
5 May 2012	Milan	Italy	Mediolanum Forum
7 May 2009	Livorno	Italy	PalaLivorno
9 May 2009	Ancona	Italy	PalaRossini
11 May 2009	Bologna	Italy	Unipol Arena
13 May 2009	Caserta	Italy	PalaMaggiò
15 May 2009	Acireale	Italy	PalaTupparello
17 May 2009	Barletta	Italy	PalaDisfida
19 May 2009	Perugia	Italy	PalaEvangelisti
Italy (Second Leg)
19 June 2009	Carrara	Italy	Piazza Carrara
21 June 2009	Verona	Italy	Verona Arena
24 June 2009	Rome	Italy	Stadio Olimpico
25 June 2009	Rome	Italy	Stadio Olimpico
27 June 2009	Agropoli	Italy	Stadio Guariglia
30 June 2009	Palermo	Italy	Velodromo Paolo Borsellino
2 July 2009	Taormina	Italy	Ancient theatre of Taormina
4 July 2009	Agrigento	Italy	Valle dei Templi
6 July 2009	Lucera	Italy	Lucera Castle
8 July 2009	Teramo	Italy	Stadio Gaetano Bonolis
8 July 2009	Cattolica	Italy	Arena della Regina
12 July 2009	Venaria Reale	Italy	Reggia Reale
14 July 2009	Sottomarina	Italy	In Diga
16 July 2009	Gallarate	Italy	Campo sportivo
19 July 2009	Cagliari	Italy	Fiera
Europe
6 September 2009	Brașov	Romania	Cerbul de Aur
North America
19 September 2009	Toronto	Canada	Massey Hall
20 September 2009	Mashantucket	United States	MGM Grand at Foxwoods
26 September 2009	Atlantic City	United States	Trump Taj Mahal
27 September 2009	Montreal	Canada	Théâtre Saint-Denis
Europe
25 May 2010	Madrid	Spain	Sala La Riviera
27 May 2010	Barcelona	Spain	Razzmatazz
29 May 2010	Valladolid	Spain	Estadio Nuevo José Zorrilla
