= Ferro =

Ferro may refer to:

- Iron, a ferromagnetic material
- Ferro (architecture), a wrought-iron architectural element
- Ferro Carril Oeste, an Argentine football team
- Ferro (Covilhã), a civil parish in the municipality of Covilhã, Portugal
- Ferro meridian, an alternative prime meridian through El Hierro
- Ferro Lad, DC Comics superhero
- Ferro (footballer) (born 1997), Portuguese footballer
- Ferro (surname)
- Ferro (film), 2020 documentary about Italian singer Tiziano Ferro
- Ferro and Ferro², Marvel Comics characters and members of Technet
