= La felicità al principio =

2023 debut novel by Tiziano Ferro

- First edition cover
- Author: Tiziano Ferro
- Audio read by: Tiziano Ferro
- Cover artist: Walid Azami
- Language: Italian
- Genre: Contemporary fiction
- Published: 3 October 2023
- Publisher: Mondadori
- Publication place: Italy
- Media type: Print; Audiobook; E-book
- Pages: 208
- ISBN: 978-8-80-474870-0

La felicità al principio (lit. 'Happiness at the Beginning') is the Italian language debut novel of singer-songwriter Tiziano Ferro, published by Mondadori on 3 October 2023. It tells the story of Angelo Galassi, a former Italian pop star living in obscurity in New York, who must face his personal issues and pull himself together for the sake of his newly discovered young daughter.

== Plot ==
Angelo Galassi is a former Italian pop star living quietly in New York. Believed dead by his fans and manager because of a clerical error he chose not to correct, he has been living in obscurity for a decade, struggling with sexual confusion, alcoholism and an eating disorder. But when a troubled ex arrives at his doorstep with a four-year-old daughter he never knew existed, Angelo begins to find new purpose to pull his life back together.

== Publication ==
La felicità al principio, Ferro's first novel, was announced in July 2023, and published in Italian by Mondadori on 3 October 2023. Ferro had previously written two autobiographical works, based on his personal diaries and published by Feltrinelli: Trent'anni e una chiacchierata con papà (Thirty Years Old and a Chat with Dad) in October 2010, and L'amore è una cosa semplice (Love Is a Simple Thing) in February 2013.

In September 2023, Ferro canceled the Italian promotional tour for the novel, explaining that his pending divorce prevented him from leaving his home in Los Angeles with his children.
