= Stadio Guido Teghil =

Italian sports venue

Coordinates: 45°40′31″N 13°05′58″E

Stadio Comunale Guido Teghil
- Interactive map of Stadio Comunale Guido Teghil
- Location: Lignano Sabbiadoro, Italy
- Capacity: 5,000
- Surface: Grass

Tenants
- Italy national rugby league team Pordenone Calcio

Stadio Guido Teghil is a stadium in Lignano Sabbiadoro, Italy. It has a capacity of over 5,000.

It was the host for Italy v Spain in the 2021 Rugby League World Cup qualifiers in November 2019. It is also the current home venue of association football Serie B club Pordenone for the 2020–21 season.

The stadium also hosts concerts, including Tiziano Ferro's Il mestiere della vita Tour 2017, and TZN Tour 2023.

== Facilities ==
The main ground has a capacity 5,000. It has four football pitches and a six lane athletic track with lighting for all.
