= Ferro (film) =

- Directed by: Beppe Tufarulo
- Written by: Federico Giunta; Beppe Tufarulo
- Produced by: Claudia Antonucci; Marcello Mereu; Nicole Plaidit
- Starring: Tiziano Ferro
- Cinematography: Johan Flores
- Edited by: Davide Molla; Tommaso Zaffaroni
- Music by: Valeriano Chiaravalle; Tiziano Lamberti
- Production company: Banijay
- Distributed by: Prime Video
- Release date: 6 November 2020
- Running time: 77 minutes
- Country: Italy
- Languages: Italian; English

Ferro is a 2020 documentary film directed by Beppe Tufarulo, focusing on the life and career of Italian singer-songwriter Tiziano Ferro. It was released on the Prime Video streaming platform on 6 November 2020.

== Synopsis ==
In the documentary, Ferro recounts various aspects of his life: from the bullying he suffered at school to the long journey that led him to coming out as gay; from the excessive weight he reached in adolescence, which represented an obstacle to signing his first record deal; to the consequent weight loss, up to his alcohol addiction, which he overcame thanks to the help of Alcoholics Anonymous. The documentary also retraces the singer-songwriter's career, with a look at the phases preceding his debut as well as a look into his personal life with his husband Victor Allen.

Other insights include Ferro's appearance on Fabio Fazio's program Che tempo che fa, during which the singer-songwriter recited a monologue against bullying and cyberbullying; his marriage to Victor; his relationship with his family, friends and manager Fabrizio Giannini; anecdotes about the bench in his hometown, Latina, where he composed his breakout song "Xdono", and about his first performances at the stadium in Latina; his affection for his late maternal grandmother; Ferro's participation as a regular guest at the Sanremo Music Festival 2020; and the different realities (on the one hand his loved ones, on the other the paparazzi) that await him every time he returns to Italy.

== Production ==
The film was directed by Beppe Tufarulo, and written by Tufarulo and television writer Federico Giunta. It was shot between 2019 and 2020, a period in which some of the events included also took place, such as the appearance on Che tempo che fa, the performances at Sanremo, and Ferro's wedding.

== Distribution ==
The film was released on the Prime Video streaming platform on 6 November 2020, in conjunction with the release of Ferro's cover album Accetto miracoli.

== Reception ==
Raffaella Giancristifaro of MYmovies called Ferro "an intense and powerful journey", and describing it as "Overloaded with exciting moments and lucid in listing childhood traumas, missteps, insecurities. A gift to the fans and to himself, to also celebrate the joy of a newfound freedom, a private rebirth and a professional restart." According to Mario Manca of Vanity Fair Italia, Ferro has the merit of being particularly sincere in the documentary:

When you make a documentary about a person's life, it's very easy to play the saint ... selecting the straight things and hiding the crooked ones, in the hope that the work will be as close as possible to the idea that the protagonist has always hoped to resemble, without running the risk of disappointing anyone. Few people have transgressed those rules and had the courage to tell the truth, and Tiziano Ferro is one of them.

== Awards ==
In 2021, Ferro received the award for Best Documentary at Filming Italy – Los Angeles, the Diversity Media Award for Best Italian Film, and an award at the Italian TV Festival (ITTV).
