= TZN – The Best of Tiziano Ferro =

2014 Tiziano Ferro album

Greatest hits album by Tiziano Ferro
- Released: 25 November 2014
- Genre: Pop; R&B
- Length: 240:39
- Label: Universal
- Producer: Tiziano Ferro; Michele Canova

Tiziano Ferro chronology
L'amore è una cosa semplice (2011)	TZN – The Best of Tiziano Ferro (2014)	Il mestiere della vita (2016)

Singles from TZN – The Best of Tiziano Ferro
- 1. "Senza scappare mai più" Released: 17 October 2014; 2. "Incanto" Released: 16 January 2015; 3. "Lo stadio" Released: 22 May 2015; 4. "Il vento" Released: 9 October 2015

TZN – The Best of Tiziano Ferro is the first greatest hits album by Italian singer-songwriter Tiziano Ferro. It was released on 25 November 2014. It contains all of his singles, five new songs, and three older songs of which only the demos had previously surfaced. The deluxe edition adds a rarities disc with more new material, and a duets disc. The special fan edition includes two DVDs with all of Ferro's music videos.

== Singles ==
The album's lead single was "Senza scappare mai più", released on 17 October 2014. It peaked at No. 2 on the Italian Singles Chart. Italian media pointed out that the song was not gender-neutral, and was therefore the first song by a popular Italian artist that was explicitly about love between two men.

The second single "Incanto" was released on 16 January 2015. Ferro described it as "extremely different" from his previous work due to its folk sound. He wrote it together with Emanuele Dabbono.

== Track listing ==
=== Standard edition ===
CD1
No.	Title	Writer(s)	Length
1.	"Lo stadio"	Tiziano Ferro	3:45
2.	"Incanto"	Ferro; Emanuele Dabono	3:32
3.	"Senza scappare mai più"	Ferro	3:36
4.	"La fine"	Francesco Tarducci; Marco Zangirolami	3:45
5.	"L'amore è una cosa semplice"	Ferro	4:02
6.	"Troppo buono"	Ferro	4:29
7.	"Per dirti ciao!"	Ferro	3:33
8.	"Hai delle isole negli occhi"	Ferro	3:57
9.	"L'ultima notte al mondo"	Ferro	3:52
10.	"La differenza tra me e te"	Ferro	3:50
11.	"Each Tear" (Mary J. Blige featuring Tiziano Ferro)	Mary Jane Blige; Ferro; Dwayne-Quin Chee; Mitchum Chin	4:17
12.	"Scivoli di nuovo"	Ferro; Diana Tejera	4:06
13.	"Il sole esiste per tutti"	Ferro	4:09
14.	"Indietro"	Ferro; Ivano Fossati	3:38
15.	"Il regalo più grande"	Ferro	3:47
16.	"Alla mia età"	Ferro	3:32
17.	"E fuori è buio"	Ferro; Tejera	3:43
18.	"E Raffaella è mia"	Ferro	3:15

CD2
No.	Title	Writer(s)	Length
1.	"Ti scatterò una foto"	Ferro	4:32
2.	"Ed ero contentissimo"	Ferro	4:10
3.	"Stop! Dimentica"	Ferro	3:46
4.	"Se il mondo si fermasse"	Ferro	4:31
5.	"Ti voglio bene"	Ferro	4:48
6.	"Universal Prayer" (with Jamelia)	Ferro; Jamelia Davis; Mikkel S. Eriksen; Tor Erik Hermansen; Tom Nichols	4:06
7.	"Non me lo so spiegare"	Ferro	4:00
8.	"Sere nere"	Ferro	4:24
9.	"Xverso"	Ferro	3:50
10.	"Le cose che non dici"	Ferro	3:55
11.	"Rosso relativo"	Ferro	4:01
12.	"Imbranato"	Ferro	5:02
13.	"L'olimpiade"	Ferro	3:40
14.	"Perdono"	Ferro	4:01
15.	"Il vento"	Ferro	4:04
16.	"Angelo mio"	Ferro; Silvia Ciocca; Rhett Lawrence; Travon Potts	4:06
17.	"Sulla mia pelle"	Filippo Brucoli; Gianluca Correggia	4:14
18.	"Quando ritornerai"	Ferro	3:43

=== Deluxe edition ===
CD3 – Rarities
No.	Title	Writer(s)	Length
1.	"(Tanto)³" (with Jovanotti)	Lorenzo Cherubini	3:29
2.	"Latina"	Ferro	3:55
3.	"Aria di vita" (Acoustic version)	Ferro	3:21
4.	"Difendimi per sempre" (Demo)	Ferro	4:10
5.	"L'amore e basta!" (Demo)	Ferro	3:21
6.	"Cambio casa"	Ferro	3:46
7.	"Le passanti" (Live at Che tempo che fa)	Georges Brassens; Fabrizio De André	3:56
8.	"Eri come l'oro ora sei come loro" (Swing version)	Ferro	3:55
9.	"Il re di chi ama troppo" (Live with Fiorella Mannoia)	Ferro	3:56
10.	"La differenza tra me e te" (Swing version)	Ferro	4:13
11.	"Sere nere" (Brazilian version with Liah)	Ferro	4:27
12.	"Liebe ist einfach / L'amore è una cosa semplice" (with Cassandra Steen)	Ferro	4:04

CD4 – Duets
No.	Title	Writer(s)	Length
1.	"Cuestión de feeling" (with Mina)	Riccardo Cocciante	4:54
2.	"Arrivederci Roma" (with Dean Martin)	Sandro Giovannini; Pietro Garinei; Renato Rascel; Carl Sigman	2:42
3.	"Non me lo so spiegare" (with Laura Pausini)	Ferro	4:32
4.	"Il tempo stesso" (with Franco Battiato)	Ferro; Franco Battiato	3:03
5.	"Breathe Gentle" (with Kelly Rowland)	Ferro; Fossati; Billy Mann	3:39
6.	"Persone silenziose" (with Luca Carboni)	Luca Carboni	4:42
7.	"Mi credo" (with Pepe Aguilar)	Enrique Guzmán Yañez	5:10
8.	"Karma" (with John Legend)	Ferro; Mann	3:18
9.	"Amiga" (with Miguel Bosé)	Luis Gómez-Escolar	4:37
10.	"Killer" (with Baby K)	Ferro; Claudia Nahum; Michele Canova	3:33
11.	"Sogni risplendono" (with Linea 77)	Ferro; Emiliano Audisio; Christian Montanarella; Paolo Pavanello; Davide Pavanello; Nicola Sangermano	3:38
12.	"Baciano le donne" (with Biagio Antonacci)	Ferro	3:06
13.	"El regalo más grande" (with Amaia Montero)	Ferro	3:50

=== International edition ===
Internationally, a single disc version of the album was released.

No.	Title	Writer(s)	Length
1.	"Senza scappare mai più"	Ferro	3:36
2.	"Incanto"	Ferro; Dabbono	3:32
3.	"Lo stadio"	Ferro	3:45
4.	"Perdono"	Ferro	4:01
5.	"L'olimpiade"	Ferro	3:40
6.	"Imbranato"	Ferro	5:02
7.	"Rosso relativo"	Ferro	4:01
8.	"Xverso"	Ferro	3:50
9.	"Sere nere"	Ferro	4:24
10.	"Non me lo so spiegare"	Ferro	4:00
11.	"Universal Prayer" (with Jamelia)	Ferro; Davis; Eriksen; Hermansen; Nichols	4:06
12.	"Stop! dimentica"	Ferro	3:46
13.	"Ti scatterò una foto"	Ferro	4:32
14.	"Alla mia età"	Ferro	3:32
15.	"Il regalo più grande"	Ferro	3:47
16.	"Breathe Gentle" (with Kelly Rowland)	Ferro; Fossati; Mann	3:39
17.	"Each Tear" (Mary J. Blige featuring Tiziano Ferro)	Blige; Ferro; Chee; Chin	4:17
18.	"La differenza tra me e te"	Ferro	3:50
19.	"L'amore è una cosa semplice"	Ferro	4:02

== Charts ==
=== Weekly charts ===
Chart (2014)	Peak position
Belgian Albums (Ultratop Wallonia)	72
Italian Albums (FIMI)	1
Spanish Albums (Promusicae)	8
Swiss Albums (Schweizer Hitparade)	29

=== Year-end charts ===
Chart (2014)	Position
Italian Albums (FIMI)	3

== Certifications ==
Region	Certification	Certified units/sales
Italy (FIMI)	8× Platinum	400,000^{*}
^{*} Sales figures based on certification alone.
