= Il mestiere della vita =

2016 Tiziano Ferro album

Il mestiere della vita El oficio de la vida

Studio album by Tiziano Ferro
- Released: 2 December 2016
- Studio: Los Angeles, Perugia, San Miniato, Roma
- Genre: Pop
- Length: 46:29
- Label: Universal
- Producer: Michele Canova

Tiziano Ferro chronology
TZN – The Best of Tiziano Ferro (2014)	Il mestiere della vita El oficio de la vida (2016)	Accetto miracoli (2019)

Singles from Il mestiere della vita
- 1. "Potremmo ritornare" Released: 28 October 2016; 2. "Il conforto" Released: 13 January 2017; 3. "My Steelo" Released: 17 March 2017; 4. "Lento/Veloce" Released: 21 April 2017; 5. "Valore assoluto" Released: 8 September 2017; 6. "Il mestiere della vita" Released: 17 November 2017; 7. ""Solo" è solo una parola" Released: 2 February 2018

Il mestiere della vita ("The Mystery of Life") is the sixth studio album by Italian singer-songwriter Tiziano Ferro, released on 2 December 2016. Ferro has called it the beginning of the second chapter of his career, after the first chapter was concluded by the release of his first greatest hits album. The album sees Ferro return to a more modern and electronic style.

The Spanish version of the album is titled El oficio de la vida and includes a duet with Vanesa Martín.

== Singles ==
The album's lead single was "Potremmo ritornare", released on 28 October 2016. The ballad debuted on top of the Italian Singles Chart, becoming Ferro's first number-one hit since "Alla mia età".

== Track listing ==
Il mestiere della vita
No.	Title	Writer(s)	Length
1.	"Epic"	Tiziano Ferro; Claudia Nahum; Michele Canova	2:55
2.	""Solo" è solo una parola"	Ferro	3:41
3.	"Il mestiere della vita"	Ferro; Davide Simonetta; Alex Vella	3:18
4.	"Valore assoluto"	Ferro; Emanuele Dabbono	3:47
5.	"Il conforto" (featuring Carmen Consoli)	Ferro; Dabbono	3:56
6.	"Lento / Veloce"	Ferro; Dabbono	3:19
7.	"Troppo bene (per stare male)"	Ferro	3:57
8.	"My Steelo" (featuring Tormento)	Ferro; Massimiliano "Tormento" Cellamaro	3:39
9.	"Potremmo ritornare"	Ferro; Michael Tenisci	3:29
10.	"Ora perdona"	Ferro	3:41
11.	"Casa è vuota"	Ferro; THE ELEV3N; Melanie Fontana	3:29
12.	"La tua vita intera"	Ferro; Elise LeGrow; Canova	3:27
13.	"Quasi quasi"	Ferro; Silvina Magari	3:44
Total length:			46:29

El oficio de la vida
No.	Title	Writer(s)	Length
1.	"Épico"	Ferro; Nahum; Canova	2:55
2.	""Sólo" es sólo una palabra"	Ferro	3:42
3.	"El oficio de la vida" (featuring Vanesa Martín)	Ferro; Davide Simonetta; Alex Vella	3:18
4.	"Valor absoluto"	Ferro; Emanuele Dabbono	3:48
5.	"Podríamos regresar"	Ferro; Tenisci	3:29
6.	"Lento/Veloz"	Ferro; Dabbono	3:19
7.	"Troppo bene (per stare male)"	Ferro	3:57
8.	"Casi" (featuring Silvina Magari)	Ferro; Silvina Magari	3:45
9.	"El consuelo"	Ferro; Dabbono	3:56
10.	"My Steelo" (featuring Tormento)	Ferro; Massimiliano "Tormento" Cellamaro	3:41
11.	"Tu vida entera"	Ferro; Elise LeGrow; Canova	3:27
12.	"Casa è vuota"	Ferro; THE ELEV3N; Melanie Fontana	3:30
13.	"Ora perdona"	Ferro	3:41
Total length:			46:29

== Charts ==
=== Weekly charts ===
Il mestiere della vita

Chart (2016–17)	Peak position
Belgian Albums (Ultratop Wallonia)	52
Italian Albums (FIMI)	1
Swiss Albums (Schweizer Hitparade)	4

El oficio de la vida

Chart (2017)	Peak position
Spanish Albums (PROMUSICAE)	34

=== Year-end charts ===
Chart (2017)	Position
Italian Albums (FIMI)	6

== Certifications ==
Region	Certification	Certified units/sales
Italy (FIMI)	6× Platinum	300,000^{‡}
^{‡} Sales+streaming figures based on certification alone.
