= Cuore rotto =

2025 Tiziano Ferro song

- Screenshot of Ferro from the music video

Single by Tiziano Ferro

from the album Sono un grande
- Language: Italian
- Released: 5 September 2025
- Genre: R&B
- Length: 2:28
- Label: Sugar Music
- Songwriter: Tiziano Ferro
- Producers: Marco Sonzini; Marz; Zef

Tiziano Ferro singles chronology
"Feeling" (2024)	"Cuore rotto" (2025)	"Fingo&spingo" (2025)

Music video
- "Cuore rotto" on YouTube

"Cuore rotto" is a single by Italian singer Tiziano Ferro, released by Sugar Music on 5 September 2025. The track features music and lyrics by Ferro, and was produced by Marco Sonzini, Alessandro Pulga, aka Marz, and Stefano Tognini, aka Zef. It is the first single from Ferro's forthcoming ninth studio album, Sono un grande.

== Composition ==
The song was written and composed by Ferro. He explained:

I wrote "Cuore rotto" one day when my friends had convinced me to leave Los Angeles to take a break from everything that was happening. I went up to my hotel room with the intention of coming downstairs a few minutes later for dinner, but in the silence of that empty room ... the lyrics and music came to me in one go, and I had no choice but to cancel all my commitments and stay there writing. I felt that otherwise I would have missed that moment and would never have been able to find those words again.

"Cuore rotto" was produced by Marco Sonzini, Alessandro Pulga, aka Marz, and Stefano Tognini, aka Zef.

== Promotion and release ==
The single was announced on 1 September 2025 on Instagram. Ferro had previously purged all posts from his profile on the social media platform, to which Cosmopolitan Italia explained, "In the universal language of music and social media, when an artist hides all the Instagram posts posted on his profile and leaves it completely white and clean, then it only means one thing: new music is coming."

"Cuore rotto" was released by Sugar Music on 5 September 2025. It is Ferro's first single since he signed with Sugar Music earlier that year. Ferro announced the accompanying album, Sono un grande, on 24 September 2025, to be released on 24 October 2025.

== Music video ==
The music video is directed by Cosimo Alemà and produced by Borotalco TV. It debuted on Ferro's YouTube channel in conjunction with the release of the song.

== Charts ==
Chart performance for "Cuore rotto"
Chart (2025)	Peak position
Italy (FIMI)	15
Italy Airplay (EarOne)	1
