= L'olimpiade =

Single by Tiziano Ferro

from the album Rosso relativo
- Released: 26 October 2001
- Recorded: 2001
- Studio: Kaneepa Studio, Padua (Italy)
- Genre: R&B; alternative hip hop
- Length: 3:40
- Label: EMI
- Songwriter: Tiziano Ferro
- Producer: Michele Canova

Tiziano Ferro singles chronology
"Xdono" (2001)	"L'olimpiade" (2001)	"Imbranato" (2002)

"L'olimpiade" (transl. "The Olympic", Italian pronunciation: [lolimˈpiːade]) is a song by Italian singer Tiziano Ferro, released on 26 October 2001 as the second single from his debut studio album Rosso relativo. The song received wide airplay for several months by Italian radios, reaching the top of the charts, however, it was never officially released as a physical edition single in Italy. It was only released in CD format in Switzerland.

== Song meaning ==
In the lyrics, Tiziano compares life to an Olympic game: he encourages the listeners to never give up, because they will win their own Olympics.

== Music video ==
Tiziano participates in the video as a singer and dancer, with other dancers; in other scenes, he is also seen as a spectator, observing the scene by a car. The video also shows people passing by. Towards the end of the video, Tiziano raises a candle to commemorate American singer Aaliyah, who had died just a few months before the song was released. Tiziano also pays homage to her by wearing a dark-coloured T-shirt with Aaliyah's name printed in white.

== Other versions ==
A rearranged swing version of the song was included in Tiziano's 2011 album L'amore è una cosa semplice.
The song was also translated into Spanish, with the title La olimpiada.

== Charts ==
Chart (2001)	Peak position
Switzerland	49
