= Balla per me =

Single by Tiziano Ferro and Jovanotti

from the album Accetto miracoli
- Language: Italian
- Released: June 5, 2020
- Genre: Dance pop
- Length: 3:25
- Label: Virgin, Universal
- Songwriter: Tiziano Ferro
- Producers: Timbaland; Angel López; Federico Vindver

Tiziano Ferro singles chronology
"Amici per errore" (2020)	"Balla per me" (2020)	"Casa a Natale" (2020)

Jovanotti singles chronology
""Canzone"" (2019)	"Balla per me" (2020)	""Simm' tutt'uno"" (2020)

Music video
- "Balla per me" on YouTube

"Balla per me" is a song recorded by Italiano singers Tiziano Ferro and Jovanotti. It was released on 5 June 2020 through Virgin Records and Universal Music Italy as the fifth single from Ferro's seventh studio album Accetto miracoli.

== Composition ==
The third track on the album, the song featured vocal participation by Italian singer-songwriter Jovanotti and production by Timbaland, Angel Lopez and Federico Vindver. The song was also adapted into Spanish by Diego Galindo Martínez, under the title "Bailame a mí", but not extracted as a single from the spanish version of the album Acepto milagros.

In a press conference, Ferro explained the meaning of the song and the choice to collaborate with Jovanotti.

== Music video ==
Screenshot of Jovanotti and Ferro from the music video

The music video, directed by Marco Gentile and Giorgio Testi, was released on June 22, 2020 through the Ferro's YouTube channel. It was filmed entirely during the COVID-19 pandemic, during which Ferro was in Los Angeles and Jovanotti was in Cortona, Italy. At the beginning of the clip Ferro listens to some of Jovanotti's hits ("La mia moto", "Serenata rap", "Oh, vita!", "Fango", "Il più grande spettacolo dopo il Big Bang", "Mezzogiorno", "A te", "(Tanto)³" and "L'ombelico del mondo").

== Charts ==
Chart performance for "Balla per me"
Chart (2020)	Peak position
Italy (FIMI)	36
Italy Airplay (EarOne)	2

== Certifications ==
Certifications for "Balla per me"
Region	Certification	Certified units/sales
Italy (FIMI)	Platinum	70,000^{‡}
^{‡} Sales+streaming figures based on certification alone.
