= Il conforto =

2017 single by Tiziano Ferro ft. Carmen Consoli

"Il conforto" "El consuelo"

Single by Tiziano Ferro ft. Carmen Consoli

from the album Il mestiere della vita / El Oficio de la Vida
- Released: January 13, 2017
- Recorded: 2016
- Genre: Contemporary R&B
- Length: 3:56
- Label: Universal
- Songwriters: Tiziano Ferro; Emanuele Dabbono
- Producer: Michele Canova

Tiziano Ferro singles chronology
"Potremmo ritornare" (2016)	"Il conforto" "El consuelo" (2017)	"Mi sono innamorato di te" (2017)

Carmen Consoli singles chronology
"Ottobre" (2015)	"Il conforto" (2017)	"Uomini topo" (2018)

Music video
- "Il conforto" on YouTube

"Il conforto" (lit. 'The comfort') is a 2016 pop song written by Italian singer Tiziano Ferro and Emanuele Dabbono and performed by Ferro featuring Carmen Consoli. It was released as the second single from his sixth album Il mestiere della vita and was adapted in Spanish by Diego Galindo Martínez with the title "El consuelo" for the Spanish-language version of the album, El Oficio de la Vida.

Ferro and Consoli had already collaborated in 2010, co-writing the Consoli's song "Guarda l'alba". They performed the song out of competition at the Sanremo Music Festival 2017. The song was a major hit, getting certified triple platinum. In 2018, Ferro recorded a new version of the song in duet with Giorgia for her album Pop Heart.

== Charts ==
Weekly charts

Chart (2017)	Peak position
Italy (FIMI)	4
Italy Airplay (EarOne)	1

Year-end charts

Chart (2017)	Peak position
Italy (FIMI)	45

== Certifications ==
Region	Certification	Certified units/sales
Italy (FIMI)	3× Platinum	150,000^{‡}
^{‡} Sales+streaming figures based on certification alone.
