= Senza scappare mai più =

Single by Tiziano Ferro

from the album TZN – The Best of Tiziano Ferro
- Released: October 17, 2014
- Genre: Pop; R&B
- Length: 3:35
- Label: EMI
- Songwriter: Tiziano Ferro
- Producer: Michele Canova

Tiziano Ferro singles chronology
| "Persone silenziose (feat. Luca Carboni)" (2013) | "Senza scappare mai più" (2014) | "Incanto" (2015) |

"Senza scappare mai più" (English: "Without running away anymore") is a song written and recorded by Italian singer-songwriter Tiziano Ferro, released on November 25, 2014 as the lead single from his first greatest hits album TZN – The Best of Tiziano Ferro.

The song is also notable for being one of first Italian love songs written from a male perspective to another man, and it's also one of Tiziano's first love songs focusing specifically on his first relationship with his partner, at that time.

== Music video ==
The video, directed by Gaetano Morbioli and produced by Federica Filipinos, was premiered in the Italian channel TV, Sky Uno, on October 27, 2014. In the video, plays his alter ego. Who plays the most important characters of his discography music. While current Tiziano Ferro, always present, walks among them singing Senza scappare mai più.

== Track listing ==
Digital download (Italian)

1. "Senza scappare mai più" – 3:35

Digital download (Spanish)

1. "No Escaparé Nunca Más" – 3:35

7" (Only in Italy)

- 7" vinyl
1. "Senza scappare mai più" – 3:35
2. "Xdono" – 3:59

== Charts ==
=== Weekly charts ===
| Chart (2014/2015) | Peak position |
|---|---|
| Belgium (Ultratip Bubbling Under Wallonia) | 25 |
| Italy (FIMI) | 2 |
| Italy Airplay (EarOne) | 1 |
| Switzerland (Schweizer Hitparade) | 57 |

=== Year-end charts ===
| Chart (2014) | Peak position |
|---|---|
| Italy (FIMI) | 89 |
| Italy Airplay (EarOne) | 58 |

== Certifications ==
| Region | Certification | Certified units/sales |
|---|---|---|
| Italy (FIMI) | Platinum | 30,000^{‡} |
^{‡} Sales+streaming figures based on certification alone.
