= Potremmo ritornare =

"Potremmo ritornare" "Podríamos Regresar"

Single by Tiziano Ferro

from the album Il mestiere della vita / El Oficio de la Vida
- Released: October 28, 2016
- Recorded: 2016
- Genre: Pop
- Length: 3:29
- Label: Universal
- Songwriter: Tiziano Ferro
- Producer: Michele Canova

Tiziano Ferro singles chronology
"Il vento" (2015)	"Potremmo ritornare" "Podríamos Regresar" (2016)	"Il conforto" (2017)

Music video
- "Potremmo ritornare" on YouTube

"Potremmo ritornare" is a pop song written by Italian pop singer Tiziano Ferro. It was released as the first single from his sixth album Il mestiere della vita (2016) and achieved success in Italy, where it was certified double platinum by the Federation of the Italian Music Industry.

A Spanish-language version of the song was also released. Titled "Podríamos Regresar", it served as the first single from El Oficio de la Vida, the Spanish edition of Ferro's sixth studio album.

== Background and release ==
Considered by the artist as the heir to Alla mia età, it was composed by Ferro in collaboration with Michael Tenisci (songwriter, along with Tiziano, of the song "La vita in un anno", written for Alessandra Amoroso and contained in the album Vivere a colori of 2016) and it is dedicated to a woman that the singer and composer has no more at his side; for his writing, Tiziano was inspired by the text by Non escludo il ritorno of Franco Califano. About the song, Ferro said:

In a world that is used to high volume and has no more time to listen to anyone, I answered in a low voice. With a song that speaks of those who at some point need to draw conclusions. Look around. Everything takes shape at the beginning of a new chapter. Who goes and who "could come back"

The song was adapted in Spanish by Diego Galindo Martinez with the title "Podríamos regresar" and released as the first single in Spain on January 20, 2017 from the album El Oficio de la Vida .

== Music video ==
The music video (in Italian and Spanish) was directed by Gaetano Morbioli and shot in California. The singer is filmed in black and white while walking on stretches of sand (Desert Becker and Desert Dunes) and while walking barefoot by the sea (Laguna Beach).

On October 28, 2016, the same day of the publication of the single, the relative "making-of" of the piece was made available on the YouTube channel of the Vevo profile of the artist. On 20 January 2017, the videoclip of Podríamos regresar was published on YouTube.

== Track listing ==
Digital download (Italy)

1. "Potremmo ritornare" – 3:29

Digital download (Spain)

1. "Podríamos Regresar" – 3:27

7" (Only in Italy)

- 7" vinyl
1. "Potremmo ritornare" – 3:31
2. "Potremmo ritornare (instrumental)" – 3:31

== Charts ==
=== Weekly charts ===
Chart (2016)	Peak position
Belgium (Ultratip Bubbling Under Wallonia)	40
Italy (FIMI)	1
Italy Airplay (EarOne)	1
Switzerland (Schweizer Hitparade)	72

=== Year-end charts ===
Chart (2016)	Peak position
Italy (FIMI)	91

== Certifications ==
Region	Certification	Certified units/sales
Italy (FIMI)	3× Platinum	150,000^{‡}
^{‡} Sales+streaming figures based on certification alone.
