= Il mondo è nostro =

2023 Tiziano Ferro album

Il mondo è nostro El mundo es nuestro

Studio album by Tiziano Ferro
- Released: November 11, 2022
- Recorded: 2021–2022
- Studio: Los Angeles (Kaneepa Studio)
- Genre: Pop; R&B
- Length: 43:12
- Language: Italian, Spanish, English
- Label: Universal; Virgin
- Producer: Tiziano Ferro; Marco Sonzini; Sting; Martin Kierszenbaum

Tiziano Ferro chronology
Accetto miracoli: l'esperienza degli altri (2020)	Il mondo è nostro El mundo es nuestro (2022)	Sono un grande (2025)

Singles from Il mondo è nostro
- 1. "La vita splendida" Released: 9 September 2022; 2. "La prima festa del papà" Released: 11 November 2022; 3. "Rotonda" Released: 1 January 2023; 4. "Addio mio amore" Released: 3 March 2023; 5. "Destinazione mare" Released: 5 May 2023; 6. "Abbiamo vinto già" Released: 1 September 2023

Il mondo è nostro ("The World Is Ours") is the eighth studio album by Italian singer-songwriter Tiziano Ferro, released on 11 November 2022 through Virgin Records and Universal Music Italy. The album featured collaborations with Tha Supreme, Caparezza, Ambra Angiolini, Roberto Vecchioni and British singer-songwriter Sting.

The Spanish version of the album is titled El mundo es nuestro was published on 10 March 2023.

== Composition ==
Il mondo è nostro was produced by Tiziano Ferro himself, Marco Sonzini, Tha Supreme and Sting, who also duets with Ferro on "For Her Love - Sempre amata". The album featured the songwriting contributions of Brunori Sas and Dimartino, with vocal collaborations by Caparezza, Ambra Angiolini and Roberto Vecchioni. Ferro has described the creative process and the meaning of the album:

As early as the second or third studio album, I started to think, "Tiziano, you have nothing more to say." In 2020, with the pandemic, that fear came back stronger than before. I looked in the mirror and asked myself what I really did in life. I answered, "I sing for people." Maybe it is a trivial thing, but people like me who have a long history in music are unfortunately spoiled, or rather, comfortable: I have a group of people who work with me, who stimulate me, who help me to do things that alone you can no longer think about. And instead this time alone, with my music-making program and a computer, I'm back to the essence. Like in my little room as a kid.

The Spanish version of the album was translated by Ferro himself, José Manuel Moles and Juan Mari Montes.

== Critical reception ==
Mattia Marzi of Rockol gave the album a score of 7 out of 10, defining it "the perfect portrait of who he is today" and appreciating that the artist dedicated himself to the production of the songs. Marzi stressed that the singer-songwriter "between acoustic guitar, choruses and R&B sounds goes back to being the one who on Top of the Pops in the 2000s sang Xdono". Gabriele Antonucci, a Panorama music reviewer, noted that Il mondo è nostro is the singer-songwriter's attempt to "spread the cards and try his hand at new territories, stimulated by the duets", appreciating the maintenance of the "highly emotional, piano-centered ballad" in which he can express his vocal abilities. However, the journalist described the new experiments as having "mixed results", finding Ferro's performance in the collaboration with Thasup "embarrassing".

== Track listing ==
Il mondo è nostro
No.	Title	Writer(s)	Producer(s)	Length
1.	"Il paradiso dei bugiardi"	Tiziano Ferro	Ferro; Marco Sonzini	3:58
2.	"Il mondo è nostro"	Ferro	Ferro; Sonzini	2:54
3.	"La vita splendida"	Ferro; Dario Brunori; Antonio Di Martino	Ferro; Sonzini	4:01
4.	"Addio mio amore"	Ferro	Ferro; Sonzini	4:02
5.	"La prima festa del papà"	Ferro; Massimiliano Pelan; Francesco Gramegna; Fabio De Martino	Ferro; Sonzini	3:56
6.	"Rotonda" (featuring Tha Supreme)	Ferro; Davide Mattei; Sonzini	Tha Supreme	3:19
7.	"Mi rimani tu"	Ferro; Emanuele Dabbono	Ferro	3:31
8.	"A parlare da zero"	Ferro	Ferro	2:32
9.	"L'angelo degli altri e di se stesso" (featuring Caparezza)	Ferro; Michele Salvemini	Ferro	2:32
10.	"Ambra/Tiziano" (featuring Ambra Angiolini)	Ferro	Ferro	2:58
11.	"I miti" (featuring Roberto Vecchioni)	Ferro	Ferro	2:30
12.	"Quando io ho perso te"	Ferro	Ferro	3:21
13.	"For Her Love - Sempre amata" (featuring Sting)	Sting; Ferro	Sting; Martin Kierszenbaum	3:44
Total length:				43:12

Deluxe Edition
No.	Title	Writer(s)	Producer(s)	Length
14.	"Destinazione mare"	Ferro; Roberto Casalino; Davide Simonetta	Ferro	3:23
15.	"Abbiamo vinto già" (featuring J-Ax)	Ferro; Manuel Rocchi; Alessandro Aleotti	Ferro	3:23
Total length:				49:38

== Charts ==
=== Weekly charts ===
Chart (2022)	Peak position
Italian Albums (FIMI)	1
Swiss Albums (Schweizer Hitparade)	12

=== Year-end charts ===
Chart (2017)	Position
Italian Albums (FIMI)	54

== Certifications ==
Region	Certification	Certified units/sales
Italy (FIMI)	Platinum	50,000^{‡}
^{‡} Sales+streaming figures based on certification alone.

== Release history ==
Release dates and formats for Il mondo è nostro/El mundo es nuestro
Region	Date	Format(s)	Version(s)	Label(s)	Ref.
Various	November 11, 2022	CD; digital download; streaming	Original	Universal; Virgin	
Various	March 10, 2023	CD; digital download; streaming	Spanish version	Universal; Virgin	
