= Incanto (Tiziano Ferro song) =

Single by Tiziano Ferro

from the album TZN – The Best of Tiziano Ferro
- Released: 16 January 2015
- Recorded: 2015
- Genre: Folk-pop
- Length: 3:32
- Label: EMI
- Songwriters: Tiziano Ferro; Emanuele Dabbono
- Producer: Michele Canova

Tiziano Ferro singles chronology
"Senza scappare mai più" (2014)	"Incanto" (2015)	"Lo stadio" (2015)

Music video
- "Incanto" on YouTube

"Incanto" is a song co-written and recorded by Italian singer-songwriter Tiziano Ferro, released on January 16, 2015 as the second single from his first greatest hits album TZN – The Best of Tiziano Ferro. The Spanish version "Encanto" was performed with featured vocals by Spanish singer Pablo López.

The song was performed live for the first time February 10, 2015 to the first evening of the 65th edition of the Sanremo Festival, in which he participated as a special guest. At the same event also he performed a medley of "Non me lo so spiegare", "Sere nere" and "Il regalo più grande".

== Music video ==
The video for "Incanto" was directed by Gaetano Morbioli and filmed at Milan, and it debuted on the website of Italian newspaper la Repubblica on January 20, 2015. The video follows a typical day with Ferro, from waking up to meetings with fans.

On February 24, 2015, the Spanish version of the song, titled Encanto debuted on Vevo. The video was also directed by Morbioli, and in addition to Ferro includes clips of Pablo López, who sings parts of the song.

== Track listing ==
Digital download (Italian)

1. "Incanto" – 3:32

Digital download (Spanish)

1. "Encanto" (with Pablo López) – 3:32

== Charts ==
Chart (2015)	Peak position
Italy (FIMI)	4

== Certifications ==
Region	Certification	Certified units/sales
Italy (FIMI)	2× Platinum	100,000^{‡}
^{‡} Sales+streaming figures based on certification alone.
