= Perverso =

Single by Tiziano Ferro

from the album 111
- Released: September 12, 2003
- Recorded: 2003
- Genre: Hip hop soul; R&B
- Length: 3:41
- Label: EMI
- Songwriter: Tiziano Ferro
- Producers: Alberto Salerno; Mara Maionchi

Tiziano Ferro singles chronology
"Le cose che non dici" (2002)	"Perverso" (2003)	"Sere nere" (2004)

"Perverso" (also released under the title "Xverso") is a song written by Italian singer Tiziano Ferro. It was released as the lead single from his second album 111 and achieved huge success in Italy and Switzerland.

== Chart performance ==
In Italy, "Perverso" debuted at number five on the Italian Singles Chart on October 9, 2003. The following week, the single fell to number 8, and fell to number 9 in its third week. However, the song rose to number 8 in its fourth week, and again to number 6 in its fifth. The song stayed twelve weeks on the charts and five of those weeks within the top 10. "Perverso" became Ferro's first and only single from the 111 era to officially chart in Italy.

The song debuted at number 17 on the Swiss Singles Chart and stayed within the chart for eleven weeks.

"Perverso" also charted in Germany at number 48 and Belgium at number 39.

== Track listing ==
- Digital download
1. "Perverso" – 3:41
- Italian CD Single
1. "Perverso" — 3:41
2. "Un Pour Toi Un Pour Moi" — 3:41
- German CD Single
1. "Perverso" — 3:41
2. "Perverso" (Spanish Version) — 3:41
3. "Un Pour Toi Un Pour Moi" — 3:41

== Charts ==
Chart (2003)	Peak position
Belgium (Ultratop 50 Wallonia)	39
Germany (Media Control Charts)	48
Italy (FIMI)	5
Spain (PROMUSICAE)	5
Switzerland (Schweizer Hitparade)	17

== Release history ==
Country	Date	Format	Label
Italy	September 12, 2003	CD Single	EMI Music
Germany	October 20, 2003	CD Single	EMI Music
Italy	January 20, 2004	Vinyl Single	EMI Music
