= Il sole esiste per tutti =

Single by Tiziano Ferro

from the album Alla mia età
- B-side: "El sol existe para todos"
- Released: 11 September 2009
- Genre: Neo soul
- Length: 3:40
- Label: EMI
- Songwriter: Tiziano Ferro
- Producer: Michele Canova

Tiziano Ferro singles chronology
"Breathe Gentle" (2009)	"Il sole esiste per tutti" (2009)	"Scivoli di nuovo" (2009)

"Il sole esiste per tutti" ("The Sun Exists for Everyone") is a song by Italian singer-songwriter Tiziano Ferro. It was released on 11 September 2009 as the fourth single from his fourth studio album Alla mia età.

== Spanish version ==
The song was translated into Spanish with the title "El sol existe para todos", which appeared in the Spanish version of the Alla mia età album.

== Music video ==
The music video's footage was taken from two of Ferro's concerts held in Rome at the Stadio Olimpico on 24 and 25 June 2009.

In the video, Ferro is seen strolling through the corridors of the 'Stadio Olimpico' with his headphones on and then goes towards the stage to start the show. Ferro is then seen performing the song in front of thousands of fans.

== Track listing ==
Download digitale

1. "Il sole esiste per tutti"
2. "El sol existe para todos"

== Charts ==
Chart (2009)	Peak position
Italy (FIMI)	14
