= L'amore è una cosa semplice =

2011 Tiziano Ferro album

Studio album by Tiziano Ferro
- Released: 28 November 2011
- Genre: Pop; neo soul
- Length: 52:23
- Language: Italian; Spanish
- Label: EMI; Capitol
- Producer: Michele Canova

Tiziano Ferro chronology
| Alla mia età (2008) | L'amore è una cosa semplice (2011) | TZN – The Best of Tiziano Ferro (2014) |

Singles from L'amore è una cosa semplice
- 1. "La differenza tra me e te" Released: 14 October 2011; 2. "L'ultima notte al mondo" Released: 6 January 2012; 3. "Hai delle isole negli occhi" Released: 30 March 2012; 4. "Per dirti ciao!" Released: 22 June 2012; 5. "Troppo buono" Released: 21 September 2012; 6. "L'amore è una cosa semplice" Released: 30 November 2012; 7. "La fine" Released: 1 February 2013

L'amore è una cosa semplice (Italian: [laˈmoːre ˈɛ una ˈkɔːza ˈsemplitʃe, - ˈkɔːsa -]; transl. Love is a Simple Thing) is the fifth studio album by Italian singer-songwriter Tiziano Ferro. The album was released in Europe on 28 November 2011, and it was preceded by the single "La differenza tra me e te", released on 14 October 2011. L'amore è una cosa semplice was the best-selling album in Italy in 2012.

The album includes a song entirely written by Irene Grandi, a cover of the single "La fine" by Italian rapper Nesli, and a duet with American R&B singer John Legend.

The Spanish-language version of the album, titled El amor es una cosa simple, was released in March 2012. It includes songs adapted by Mexican songwriter Mónica Velez and Spanish singer Pablo Alborán.

== Singles ==
- The first single from the album, "La differenza tra me e te", was released in Italy on 14 October 2011. The music video for the song, directed by Gaetano Morbioli, was released through Ferro's official Vevo channel on YouTube on 27 October 2011. The single peaked at number three on the Wallonia Ultratop 50 and it spent six consecutive weeks at number two on the Italian Singles Chart, being certified double platinum by the Federation of the Italian Music Industry for domestic downloads exceeding 60,000 units. The Spanish-language version of the song, "La diferencia entre tú y yo", was released as a digital download single on 16 January 2012.
- On 6 January 2012, the track "L'ultima notte al mondo" was released in Italy as the second single from the album. The music video for the song, directed by Gaetano Morbioli, was shot in Seefeld, Austria, and it was released in February 2012. The single peaked at number five on the Italian Singles Chart, and it was certified platinum by the Federation of the Italian Music Industry. The Spanish-language version of the song, "La última noche del mundo", was released as the second single from the album in early March 2012.
- The third single from the album, "Hai delle isole negli occhi", was released in Italy on 30 March 2012. The music video for the song, directed by Fabio Jansen and filmed in Milan, was released in April 2012.
- The song "Liebe ist einfach/L'amore è una cosa semplice", a half German-language version of the title track, was recorded as a duet with Cassandra Steen and released as a single in Germany on 13 April 2012. It was the first single from the album released in Germany. The original Italian-language version of the song was later released as a single in Italy and managed to debut and peak at number 9 on the Italian Singles Chart.

== Track listing ==
=== L'amore è una cosa semplice ===
Standard version CD (5099973107521)
| No. | Title | Writer(s) | Length |
|---|---|---|---|
| 1. | "Hai delle isole negli occhi" | Tiziano Ferro | 3:59 |
| 2. | "L'amore è una cosa semplice" | Ferro | 4:03 |
| 3. | "La differenza tra me e te" | Ferro | 3:52 |
| 4. | "La fine" | Francesco Tarducci; Marco Zangirolami | 3:47 |
| 5. | "Smeraldo" | Ferro | 3:12 |
| 6. | "Interludio: 10.000 scuse" | Ferro | 2:30 |
| 7. | "L'ultima notte al mondo" | Ferro | 3:53 |
| 8. | "Paura non ho" | Irene Grandi | 3:05 |
| 9. | "TVM (Ti voglio male)" | Ferro | 4:13 |
| 10. | "Troppo buono" | Ferro | 4:30 |
| 11. | "Quiero vivir con vos" | Ferro | 3:43 |
| 12. | "...Ma so proteggerti" | Ferro | 4:55 |
| 13. | "Per dirti ciao!" | Ferro | 3:35 |
| 14. | "Karma" (featuring John Legend) | Ferro; Billy Mann | 3:22 |

German edition bonus track
| No. | Title | Writer(s) | Length |
|---|---|---|---|
| 15. | "Liebe ist einfach / L'amore è una cosa semplice" (featuring Cassandra Steen) | Ferro | 4:06 |

=== El amor es una cosa simple ===
CD, digital download
| No. | Title | Length |
|---|---|---|
| 1. | "Islas en tus ojos" | 3:57 |
| 2. | "El amor es una cosa simple" (featuring Malú, Spain edition only) | 4:01 |
| 3. | "La diferencia entre tú y yo" | 3:52 |
| 4. | "El fin" | 3:44 |
| 5. | "Esmeralda" | 3:11 |
| 6. | "Interludio: 10.000 scuse" | 2:29 |
| 7. | "La última noche del mundo" | 3:53 |
| 8. | "No tengo temor" | 3:03 |
| 9. | "TVM" | 4:11 |
| 10. | "Demasiado bueno" | 4:29 |
| 11. | "Quiero vivir con vos" | 3:41 |
| 12. | "...Ma so proteggerti" | 4:54 |
| 13. | "Te digo adiós!" | 3:33 |
| 14. | "Karma" (featuring John Legend) | 3:18 |

== Charts ==
=== Weekly charts ===
| Chart (2011–2012) | Peak position |
|---|---|
| Belgian Albums (Ultratop Wallonia) | 6 |
| Italian Albums (FIMI) | 1 |
| Mexican Albums (Top 100 Mexico) | 77 |
| Spanish Albums (PROMUSICAE) | 13 |
| Swiss Albums (Schweizer Hitparade) | 5 |

=== Year-end charts ===
| Chart (2011) | Position |
|---|---|
| Italian Albums Chart | 8 |
| Swiss Albums Chart | 96 |
| Chart (2012) | Position |
| Belgian Albums Chart (Wallonia) | 14 |
| Italian Albums Chart | 1 |
| Swiss Albums Chart | 74 |

== Certifications ==
| Region | Certification | Certified units/sales |
|---|---|---|
| Italy (FIMI) | 8× Platinum | 480,000^{*} |
| Switzerland (IFPI Switzerland) | Gold | 10,000^{^} |
^{*} Sales figures based on certification alone.^{^} Shipments figures based on certification alone.

== Release history ==
| Region | Release date | Version |
|---|---|---|
| Italy | 28 November 2011 | Italian-language version |
| Latin America | 12 March 2012 | Spanish-language version |
| United States | 26 March 2012 | Spanish-language version |
| Germany | 25 May 2012 | Italian-language version |
| Spain | 25 September 2012 | Spanish-language version |
