= Tiziano Ferro =

Italian singer (born 1980)

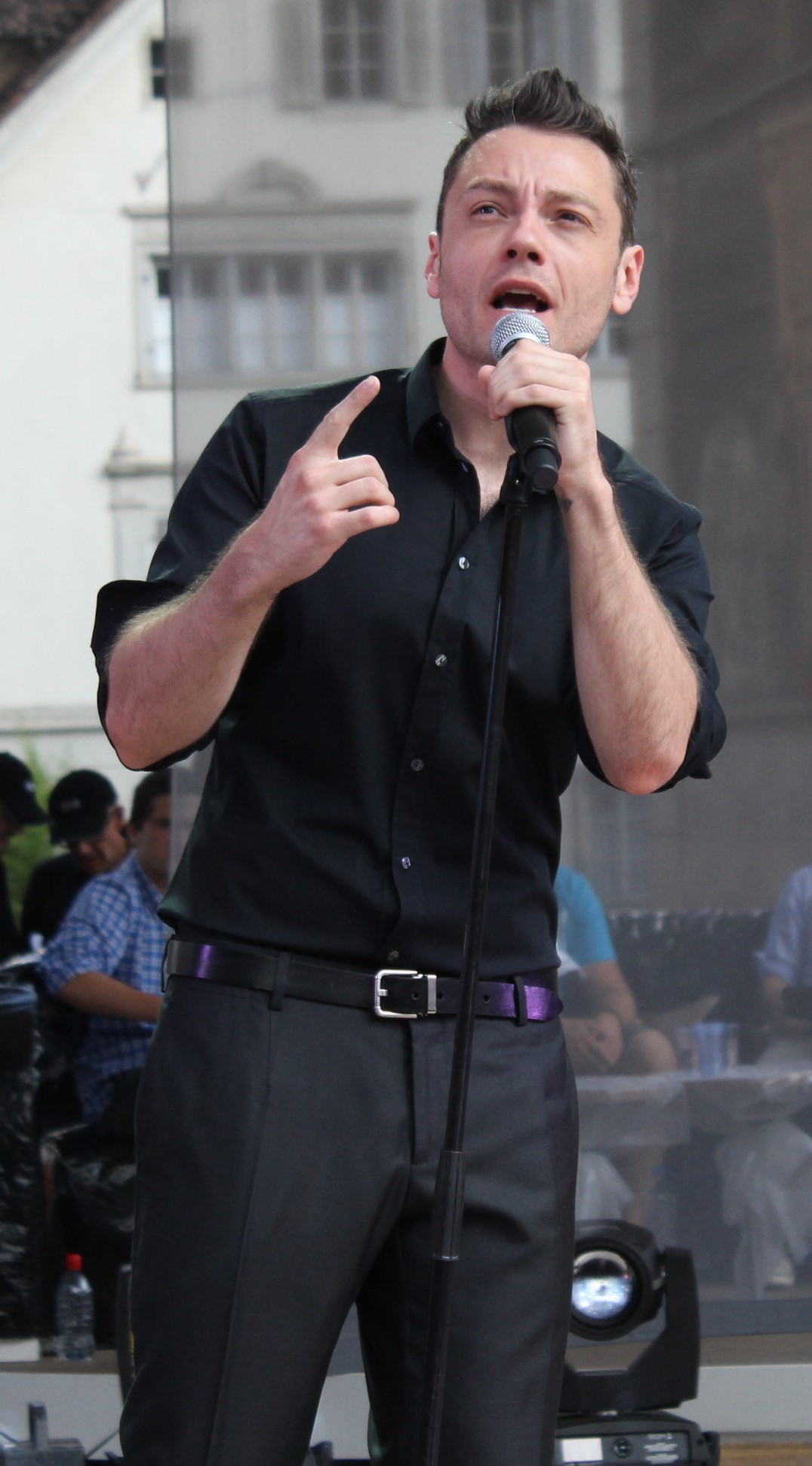
- Ferro in 2012

Background information
- Born: 21 February 1980 (age 46); Latina, Lazio, Italy
- Genres: Pop; R&B; blue-eyed soul
- Occupations: Singer; songwriter
- Years active: 1997–present
- Labels: Universal Music; EMI; Capitol
- Spouse: Victor Allen (m. 2019; div. 2024)
- Website: tizianoferro.com

Tiziano Ferro (Italian: [titˈtsjaːno ˈfɛrro]; born 21 February 1980) is an Italian pop singer and songwriter. He broke through in 2001 with his international hit single "Xdono", and has since remained commercially successful in several countries. Ferro has released a Spanish version of each of his albums and has also sung in English, Portuguese, and French. Known as the modern face of Italian pop music, he frequently writes songs for other artists and has produced albums for Giusy Ferreri, Alessandra Amoroso, and Baby K.

Aside from his success as an artist, Ferro is well known for his personal struggles. Having been overweight as a teenager, he has been outspoken about his battles with food addiction and eating disorders. In October 2010, at the height of his fame, Ferro came out as gay, having struggled with depression related to self-acceptance about his homosexuality.

Ferro is one of the best-selling artists in Italy. Both his third album Nessuno è solo and fourth album Alla mia età were certified diamond by the Federazione Industria Musicale Italiana. Despite his fears, his coming out did not negatively affect his career, as his fifth album L'amore è una cosa semplice was the best-selling album of 2012 in Italy, and his first greatest hits album was supported by a stadium tour. As of 2023, Ferro has sold over 20 million records worldwide.

== Biography ==
=== Childhood and early beginnings ===
Ferro's interest in music was born when he received a toy keyboard as a present, which was used to compose his first songs when he was seven. He later started taking guitar and piano classes at a local conservatory of music. When he was 16 years old, he joined a gospel choir and during the same years, he started performing in piano bars and karaoke contests.

In 1997, Ferro participated in the "Accademia della Canzone di Sanremo", a music contest created with the purpose of choosing the contestants for the Sanremo Music Festival, but was eliminated during the first stage of the competition. The following year, Ferro participated again in the same contest, and despite being chosen as one of the 12 finalists, he did not make it to win the competition. However, during the selections, Ferro met music producers Alberto Salerno and Mara Maionchi, and started to collaborate with them.

In 1999 Ferro also toured throughout Italy as a back vocalist with the Italian hip-hop band Sottotono.

=== Career breakthrough ===
In 2001, Ferro signed a contract with EMI Music Italy. On 22 June 2001, he released his first single, "Xdono". During the first months after the release, the song received a poor reception, but it later became a hit and, after topping the Italian Singles Chart in September 2001, it was certified double platinum by the Federation of the Italian Music Industry (FIMI) for sales exceeding 100,000 copies.

The song was included in Ferro's debut album, Rosso relativo, released on 26 October 2001. Following the commercial success obtained in Italy, in 2002 the album was released in several European countries. A Spanish-language version of the record, titled Rojo Relativo, was also released in Spain and Latin America. Rosso relativo obtained success in different markets throughout its various editions and had sold more than 1,000,000 copies worldwide by 2004, according to EMI Music. The album also allowed Ferro to receive a nomination for Best New Artist at the Latin Grammy Awards of 2003.

=== Second studio album, 111 ===
In November 2003, Ferro released his second studio album, 111, recorded both in Italian and Spanish, produced by Alberto Salerno, Mara Maionchi and Michele Canova. The album was preceded by the release of "Xverso" / "Perverso", and also spawned the singles "Sere nere" / "Tardes negras", "Non me lo so spiegare" / "No me lo puedo explicar" and "Ti voglio bene" / "Desde mañana no lo sé". 111 has sold more than 1,000,000 copies worldwide, topping the Mexican Albums Chart and being certified four times platinum in Italy for domestic sales exceeding 450,000 copies. Following the success of the album Ferro won Best Italian Artist at the 2004 MTV Europe Music Awards in Rome.

In July 2004, Ferro also released in Europe his first English language single, "Universal Prayer", a duet with British R&B singer Jamelia recorded to promote the 2004 Olympic Games in Athens, Greece.

Ferro lived in Mexico during these years, first in Cuernavaca and later in Puebla. He studied Spanish there at a university, eventually graduating in August 2005, before moving to Manchester.

=== Nessuno è solo / Nadie está solo, the third studio album ===
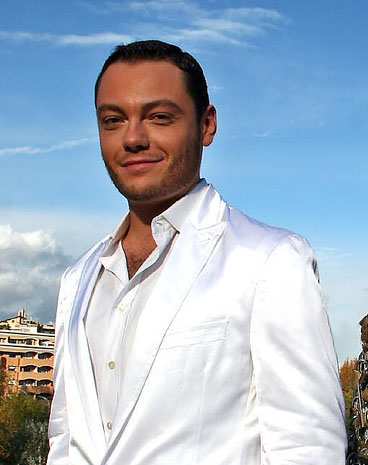
Ferro in 2006

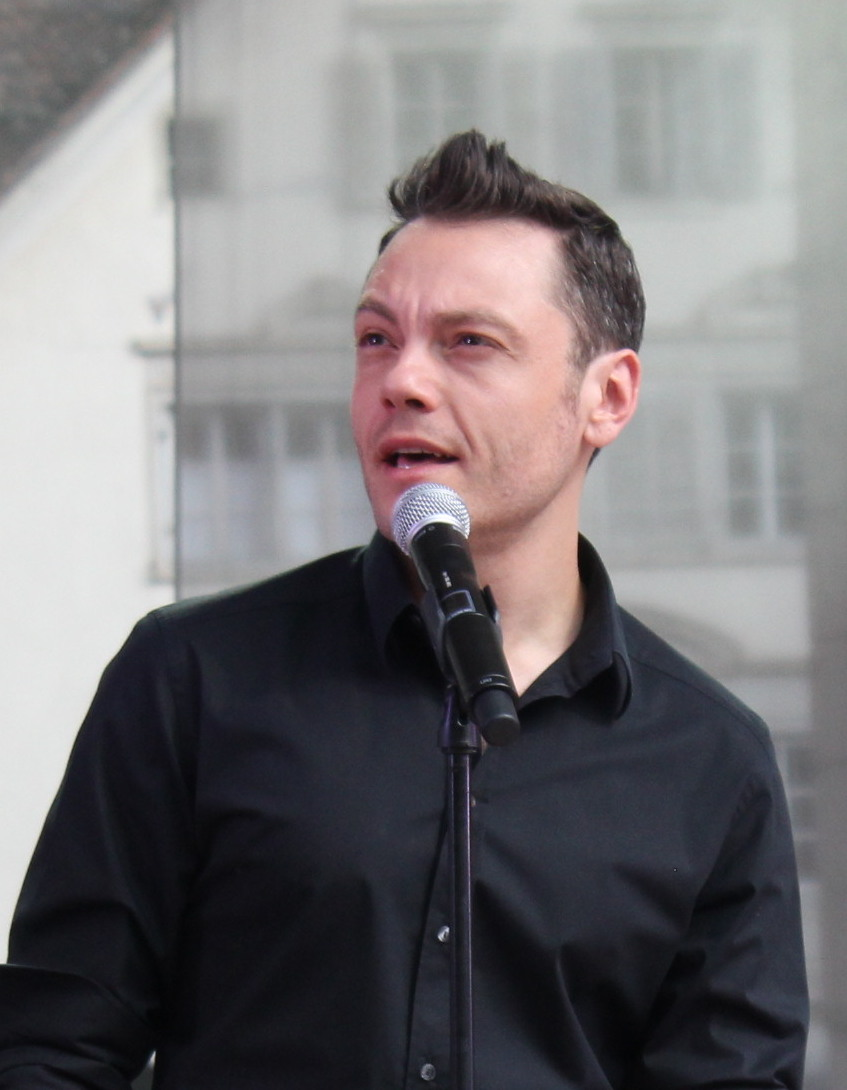
Ferro in 2012

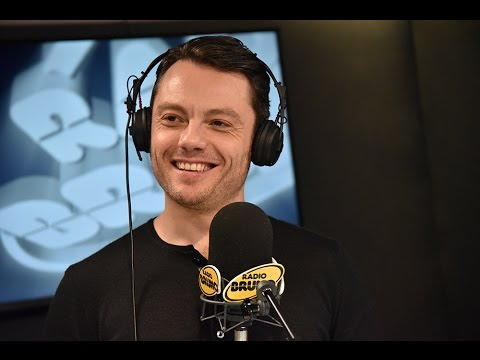
Ferro in 2015

Ferro's third studio album, Nessuno è solo / Nadie está solo, was released in June 2006, following the lead single "Stop! Dimentica", which became a number-one hit in Italy and Austria. The album, described by music critics as more intimate and melancholic, obtained in Italy a success even bigger than his previous ones, reaching diamond certification by FIMI for its domestic sales. The third single from the album, "Ti scatterò una foto", and the song "La paura che..." were included in the soundtrack of the movie Ho voglia di te, directed by Luis Prieto and based on the book with the same title by Federico Moccia. Nessuno è solo also features a duet with Italian pop singer-songwriter Biagio Antonacci, while the Spanish-language version of the album includes "Mi credo", a song recorded with Pepe Aguilar.

=== Alla mia età / A mi edad ===
In June 2008 Ferro co-wrote with Roberto Casalino the single "Non ti scordar mai di me" for X Factor Italy's first edition's runner-up Giusy Ferreri. The song became a huge success in Italy, topping the Italian Singles Chart for 12 non-consecutive weeks. Ferro also produced Giusy Ferreri's debut album, Gaetana, containing 6 songs penned by him, including "L'amore e basta!", a duet between Ferro and Ferreri.

On 7 November 2008, Ferro released his fourth studio album, Alla mia età / A mi edad, preceded by the single with the same title. Alla mia età debuted at number one on the Italian Albums Chart and became the best-selling album of 2009 in Italy, also achieving Ferro's second diamond certification. The album contains a duet with singer-songwriter Franco Battiato, and "Breathe Gentle", the English version of third single "Indietro", features Kelly Rowland. Other collaborators to the project included Italian singer Laura Pausini, Anahí and Dulce María of Mexican pop group RBD and Amaia Montero.

In November 2009, Ferro released his first video album, Alla mia età – Live in Rome, recorded during his concerts at the Stadio Olimpico on 24 and 25 June 2009. A few months later, Ferro was chosen to write and record the Italian version of Mary J. Blige's single "Each Tear", included in her album Stronger with Each Tear The song reached the top spot on the Italian Singles Chart.

=== L'amore è una cosa semplice / El amor es una cosa simple ===
In October 2011 Ferro released "La differenza tra me e te", the lead single from his fifth studio album L'amore è una cosa semplice (titled El amor es una cosa simple in Spanish). The album was released on 28 November 2011 and spent five weeks on top of the Italian Albums Chart. All seven singles were certified gold or higher in the country. The album itself was certified eight times platinum and became the best-selling album of 2012.

During the spring and summer of 2012, Ferro embarked on a largely domestic concert tour, with additional stops in Switzerland, Belgium and Monaco. The tour's highlight was Ferro's first full stadium concert at the Stadio Olimpico in Rome. This sold-out concert was attended by 50,000 fans.

In 2012, Ferro wrote the song "Per Te", sung by Andrea Bocelli and contained in the album of the world-famous jazz player Chris Botti, which earned him a Grammy Award for Best Pop Instrumental Album.

In 2013, Ferro opted to focus on collaborating with other artists. Italian female hip hop artist Baby K released her debut album Una seria in March, which was produced by Ferro together with Michele Canova. Ferro featured on first single "Killer", which peaked at No. 10 on the Italian Singles Chart and was certified platinum. He also featured on the album's third single, "Sei sola". In September Alessandra Amoroso released Amore puro, another album produced by Ferro and Canova. This album achieved a double platinum certification. Four of its five singles were written by Ferro.

=== TZN – The Best of Tiziano Ferro ===
Ferro released his first greatest hits album TZN – The Best of Tiziano Ferro in November 2014. Both the lead single "Senza scappare mai più" and the second single "Incanto" reached the top five in Italy and were certified platinum. The album itself spent six non-consecutive weeks at number one, the last of which came after his acclaimed guest performance at the Sanremo Music Festival 2015. It was eventually certified seven times platinum and spent almost a year in the top ten on the Italian album chart. In Spain, it was Ferro's first top ten album in more than ten years.

In the summer of 2015, Ferro toured the main Italian stadiums, including two concerts at the San Siro stadium in Milan and two at the Stadio Olimpico in Rome. The Milan concerts were recorded and added to a new CD/DVD edition of TZN – The Best of Tiziano Ferro, which was released in November 2015. That same month Ferro started a European arena tour to continue promoting the greatest hits compilation.

=== Il mestiere della vita ===
Ferro announced the release date of his sixth studio album a year in advance, at the last concert of his European arena tour. He told the crowd that it would be released on 2 December 2016. In June the album's title was revealed to be Il mestiere della vita. The album's lead single "Potremmo ritornare" was released in October and debuted on top of the Italian Singles Chart. It was his first number-one hit as lead artist since 2008's "Alla mia età".

Among the collaborators include Baby K, Raige, Emanuele Dabbono, Tormento and Carmen Consoli. Ferro and Consoli sang the second single "Il conforto", released on 13 January 2017. The song reached the 4th position in the Italian Singles Chart. Composed of 13 tracks, the album features pop, rap and R&B sounds, with themes ranging from forgiveness to fear and anger.

Ferro opened the Sanremo Music Festival 2017 by singing "Mi sono innamorato di te" as a tribute to Luigi Tenco, marking the 50th anniversary of his death. Ferro also performed the Il mestiere della vita tracks "Potremmo ritornare" and "Il conforto", in a duet with Consoli.

From June to July 2017 the tour "Il mestiere della vita Tour 2017" was held, consisting of thirteen dates in Italian stadiums. In April 2018 the singer-songwriter won an Onstage Award for the best Italian tour.

In 2018, Ferro collaborated with Ed Sheeran and his brother Matthew on the composition of "Amo soltanto te" ("This Is the Only Time" in the English version). Ferro wrote the lyrics of the song, interpreted by Andrea Bocelli and Ed Sheeran and included in the album Sì.

=== Accetto miracoli ===
Accetto miracoli was released in November 2019 and was certified Double Platinum in Italy. A Spanish language version, Acepto milagros, was released one week after the Italian release.

The album was partially produced by Timbaland (9 of 12 tracks) and preceded by two singles, "Buona (Cattiva) Sorte" and the title track "Accept Miracles", and Ferro described it as "fresh, honest, energetic, the result of the need to deliver myself to new experiences".

Accetto Miracoli contains 12 tracks: "Vai ad Amarti", "Amici per errore", "Balla per Me" (a duet with Jovanotti), "In mezzo a questo inverno", "Come farebbe un uomo", "Seconda pelle", "Il destino di chi visse per amare", "Le 3 parole sono 2", "Casa a Natale", "Un Uomo Pop", "Buona (Cattiva) Sorte" and "Accetto Miracoli". Only in digital formats are there 2 additional bonus tracks, "Accetto Miracoli" and "In mezzo a questo inverno", arranged by the producer Julio Reyes Copello. "Buona (cattiva) sorte" debuted in first place on the weekly EarOne chart of the most broadcast songs on Italian radio.

In the Spanish version of the album, the tracklist includes a duet on the title track with Ana Guerra. The single went to number 1 on the digital charts in Spain, France, and Benelux.

An Italian tour for Accetto miracoli was originally scheduled for 2020, but was postponed to 2021 due to the COVID-19 pandemic in Italy, and later cancelled.

In 2020, Amazon Prime released the documentary Ferro, in which Ferro opens up about his personal struggles.

In 2021, Ferro was made part of the voting committee of the American Recording Academy, the organization which bestows Grammy Awards. He is only the second Italian to join the board, after composer and conductor Gabriele Ciampi.

=== Il mondo è nostro ===
Ferro's newest album, Il mondo è nostro, was released on 11 November 2022, with an Italian stadium tour set for summer 2023. Ferro released the first single, "La vita splendida", in September 2022. On 30 September 2022, a collaboration between Ferro and Italian rapper Thasup, titled "r()t()onda", was released on Thasup's second studio album c@ra++ere s?ec!@le ("Carattere speciale"), later appearing on Il mondo è nostro. Ferro's album also includes duets with Sting ("For Her Love"), Roberto Vecchioni ("I miti"), Caparezza ("L'angelo degli altri e di se stesso") and Ambra Angiolini ("Ambra/Tiziano"). Il mondo è nostro debuted at number one on the Federazione Industria Musicale Italiana (FIMI) Top 100 Albums chart. Ferro subsequently released multiple post-album singles in 2023: "Destinazione Mare"; a new version of "Vamos a bailar" with Paola and Chiara; and "Abbiamo vinto già" with J-Ax. The Spanish language version is titled El mundo es nuestro.

Ferro's TZN Tour 2023 featured 15 dates in Italian stadiums and ran from 7 June 2023 to 16 July 2023. Alessandro Alicandri of TV Sorrisi e Canzoni called it Ferro's best tour to date.

In July 2024, Ferro appeared in the Andrea Bocelli concert event Andrea Bocelli 30: The Celebration, performing "Amo soltanto te" with Bocelli and "Invece no" with Laura Pausini.

In November 2024, Ferro and Italian singer Elodie released the duet "Feeling". In February 2025, Massimo Ranieri performed the song "Tra le mani un cuore", written by Ferro with Filippo Neviani, Giulia Anania, and Marta Venturini, at the Sanremo Music Festival 2025.

=== La felicità al principio ===
Ferro's first novel, La felicità al principio (Happiness at the Beginning) was published in Italy on 3 October 2023 by Mondadori. It tells the story of Angelo Galassi, a former Italian pop star living in obscurity in New York, who must face his personal issues and pull himself together for the sake of his newly-discovered young daughter. In September 2023, Ferro canceled the Italian promotional tour for the novel, explaining that his pending divorce prevented him from leaving his home in Los Angeles with his children.

=== Sono un grande ===
In 2025, Ferro announced that he had signed with a new label, Sugar Music, and a new manager, Paola Zukar. He said of the changes, "Working with a new team gave me the opportunity to look at what I do with new eyes, it was the opportunity to change some aspects of the work and fall in love with the music profession again."

He released the single "Cuore rotto" ("Broken heart") on 5 September 2025. A summer 2026 Italian stadium tour, the Stadi26 Tour, was announced on 15 September 2025. On 24 September 2025, Ferro announced his new album, Sono un grande, which was released on 24 October 2025. A second single, "Fingo&spingo", was released on 23 October 2025. A third single, "Sono un grande", was released on 2 January 2026.

Ferro performed as a special guest at the Sanremo Music Festival 2026 on 24 February 2026. On 2 April 2026, he released the single "Superstar", a duet with Giorgia.

== Personal life ==
In 2006, Ferro appeared on the Italian TV show Che Tempo Che Fa and joked that Mexican women "all had moustaches", which invited backlash from Mexican fans and negatively impacted subsequent album sales there.

Ferro was diagnosed with depression in 2008 and started taking antidepressants. In late 2009, he came close to taking his own life, going as far as to write a suicide note. In early 2010 his desperation led him to break down and came out to his father, an event that inspired the title of his first book, Trent'anni e una chiacchierata con papà ("Thirty years old and a chat with dad"). This book, published in October 2010, is based on his personal diaries, dutifully kept since his teenage years. Its release was preceded by an interview with Vanity Fair in which he came out as gay. The following year Ferro moved back to Italy to live closer to his friends and family. Ferro released a second autobiographical book, L'amore è una cosa semplice (Love is a simple thing), in February 2013.

In 2019, Ferro announced his marriage to former Warner Bros. consultant Victor Allen. The two were married in Sabaudia, a municipality in Ferro's native Province of Latina, in Latium. In a statement made to Corriere della Sera, Ferro confirmed that he considers himself both "gay and Catholic". On 28 February 2022, Ferro announced that he and Allen had become fathers to two children, a girl and a boy. Later that year, Ferro told Rolling Stone Italia that he would not apply for Italian passports for his children, who are also American citizens, because Italian law does not acknowledge Allen and deprives them of their right to have two parents responsible for their welfare. On 19 September 2023, Ferro announced his separation and pending divorce from Allen. Their divorce was finalized in March 2024.

Ferro has spoken out against what he refers to as Italy's anti-homosexual policies, in particular the many obstacles to parenthood for homosexual couples, including the criminalization of surrogacy and the government's refusal to recognize a second same-sex parent.

== Discography ==
- Rosso relativo (2001)
- 111 (2003)
- Nessuno è solo (2006)
- Alla mia età (2009)
- L'amore è una cosa semplice (2011)
- TZN – The Best of Tiziano Ferro (2014)
- Il mestiere della vita (2016)
- Accetto miracoli (2019)
- Accetto miracoli: l'esperienza degli altri (2020)
- Il mondo è nostro (2022)
- Sono un grande (2025)

== Filmography ==
Year	Title	Role	Notes
1992–93	My Patrasche	Jan (voice)	Main role; 26 episodes
2004	Shark Tale	Oscar (voice)	Italian dub
2004	Rebelde	Himself	Season 1, (1) episode
2005	Un paso adelante	Himself	Season 3, Episode 9: "Marta contra Adela"
2007	La fea más bella	Himself	Episode 247
2007	Grande Fratello	Himself (special guest)	Season 7 finale episode (with Elisabetta Canalis)
2012	La Voz	Himself/Trusted Advisor	Season 1, Episodes 6, 7, 8
2020	Ferro	Himself	Documentary film
2021	Drag Race Italia	Himself	Season 1, Episode 3, "Night of a Thousand Raffaella Carràs"
2022	Verissimo	Himself	Episode: "I Am Tiziano"
2023	Amici di Maria De Filippi	Himself (guest judge/performer)	Season 22, Episode 22
2023	Drag Race Italia	Himself (guest judge)	Season 3, Episode 6, "Snatch Game"
2023	Raffa	Himself	Raffaella Carrà docuseries
2024	Andrea Bocelli 30: The Celebration	Himself	Andrea Bocelli concert film and TV series

Many of Ferro's songs have been used in films and television series, including "Sere nere" in Three Steps Over Heaven (Tre metri sopra il cielo) (2004); "Ti scatterò una foto" and "La paura che..." in Ho voglia di te (2007); "L'amore è una cosa semplice" and "TVM" in Love Is Not Perfect (L'amore è imperfetto) (2012); and "La differenza tra me e te" in All Roads Lead to Rome (2015).

== Tours ==
- Rosso relativo Tour 2002–2003
- 111% Tour 2004–2005
- Nessuno è solo Tour 2007
- Alla mia età Tour 2009–2010
- L'amore è una cosa semplice Tour 2012
- Lo stadio Tour 2015
- Il mestiere della vita Tour 2017
- TZN Tour 2023
- Stadi 26 Tour
