= Ed ero contentissimo =

Single by Tiziano Ferro

from the album Nessuno è solo
- Released: 25 August 2006
- Recorded: 2006
- Genre: Pop soul
- Length: 4:12
- Label: EMI
- Songwriter: Tiziano Ferro
- Producer: Michele Canova

Tiziano Ferro singles chronology
"Stop! Dimentica" (2006)	"Ed ero contentissimo" (2006)	"Ti scatterò una foto" (2007)

"Ed ero contentissimo" (translated in English: "And I was very glad") is a song written and recorded by Italian singer-songwriter Tiziano Ferro. It was released on 25 August 2006 as the second single from his third studio album Nessuno è solo. The song achieved huge success in Italy. "Y estaba contentísimo", the Spanish version of the song, was released in Spain and other Spanish-speaking countries.

== Track listing ==
CD and digital download:

1. Ed ero contentissimo
2. Y estaba contentisimo

== Charts ==
=== Peak positions ===
Chart (2006)	Peak position
Belgium (Ultratop 50 Wallonia)	33
ERROR in "CIS": Invalid position: 248. Expected number 1–200 or dash (–).
Europe (European Hot 100)	97
Italy (FIMI)	2
Switzerland (Schweizer Hitparade)	72
