= La differenza tra me e te =

"La differenza tra me e te""

Single by Tiziano Ferro

from the album L'amore è una cosa semplice
- Released: October 14, 2011
- Recorded: 2011
- Genre: Pop rock
- Length: 3:18
- Label: EMI
- Songwriter: Tiziano Ferro
- Producer: Michele Canova

Tiziano Ferro singles chronology
"Each Tear" (2010)	"La differenza tra me e te"" (2011)	"L'ultima notte al mondo" (2012)

Music video
- "La differenza tra me e te" on YouTube

"La differenza tra me e te" (Italian: [la diffeˈrɛntsa tra mˈme e tˈte]; transl. "The Difference Between You and Me") is a song written and recorded by Italian singer-songwriter Tiziano Ferro. It was released on 14 October 2011 as the lead single from his fifth studio album L'amore è una cosa semplice. The song achieved success in Italy, where it was certified double platinum by the Federation of the Italian Music Industry, and in Belgium.

A Spanish-language version of the song was also released, titled "La diferencia entre tú y yo", and it served as the first single from El amor es una cosa simple, the Spanish edition of the album.

== Track listing ==
CD single (Italia)

1. "La differenza tra me e te"

CD single (Spain)

1. "La diferencia entre tú y yo"

Digital download

1. "La differenza tra me e te"
2. "La diferencia entre tú y yo"

== Charts ==
=== Weekly charts ===
Weekly chart performance for "La differenza tra me e te"
Chart (2011–2012)	Peak position
Belgium (Ultratip Bubbling Under Flanders)	45
Belgium (Ultratop 50 Wallonia)	3
ERROR in "CIS": Invalid position: 222. Expected number 1–200 or dash (–).
Greece (IFPI)	14
Italy (FIMI)	2
Italy Airplay (EarOne)	1
Mexico (Billboard Espanol Airplay)	28
Switzerland (Schweizer Hitparade)	51
Venezuela Top Latino (Record Report)	27

=== Year-end charts ===
2011 year-end chart performance for "La differenza tra me e te"
Chart (2011)	Position
Italy (FIMI)	15
Italy Airplay (EarOne)	40

2012 year-end chart performance for "La differenza tra me e te"
Chart (2012)	Position
Belgium (Ultratop 50 Wallonia)	56
Italy (FIMI)	59
