= Italian Music Awards =

Accolade by the Federation of the Italian Music Industry

Italian Music Award
- Awarded for: Outstanding achievements in the Italian music business
- Country: Italy
- Presented by: Federation of the Italian Music Industry
- First award: 2001
- Final award: 2003

The Italian Music Awards were an accolade established in 2001 by the Federation of the Italian Music Industry to recognize the achievements in the Italian music business both by domestic and international artists.

The awards were given by an academy composed of 400 people, including music publishers, journalists, deejays, music producers, managers, retailers and consumers.

The first Italian Music Awards ceremony was held on 5 February 2001, to honor musical accomplishments for the period between 1 December 1999 and 30 November 2000, while the fourth and last awards ceremony was held on 15 December 2003. The fifth edition of the awards was initially scheduled to be held in the end of 2004, but after being postponed in February 2004 and then in the Spring of 2004, it was canceled due to the lack of a broadcast agreement with the Italian TV networks.

The gap left by the Italian Music Awards was later filled by the Wind Music Awards, established in 2007.

== Winners and nominations ==
=== First edition ===
In the first edition of the Italian Music Awards, the biggest winner was the pop group Lùnapop, who received 4 awards, followed by Carmen Consoli with two awards.

Best Italian Male Artist

- Adriano Celentano
  - Biagio Antonacci
  - Franco Battiato
  - Alex Britti
  - Luciano Ligabue
  - Eros Ramazzotti

Best Italian Female Artist

- Carmen Consoli
  - Elisa
  - Irene Grandi
  - Mina
  - Laura Pausini

Italian Italian Revelation of the Year

- Lùnapop
  - Carlotta
  - Eiffel 65
  - Subsonica
  - Tricarico

Best Italian Dance Artist

- Eiffel 65
  - Alexia
  - Gigi D'Agostino
  - Prezioso
  - Spiller

Best Italian Group

- Lùnapop
  - Avion Travel
  - Bluvertigo
  - Paola e Chiara
  - Subsonica

Best Italian Tour

- Luciano Ligabue
  - Claudio Baglioni
  - Carmen Consoli
  - Jovanotti
  - Lùnapop

Best Italian Single

- "Qualcosa di grande" — Lùnapop
  - "Parole di burro" — Carmen Consoli
  - "Un giorno migliore" — Lùnapop
  - "Vamos a bailar (Esta vida nueva)" — Paola e Chiara
  - "Io sono Francesco" — Tricarico

Best Italian Videoclip

- "Parole di burro" — Carmen Consoli
  - "Una su 1.000.000" — Alex Britti
  - "File Not Found" — Jovanotti
  - "Qualcosa di grande" — Lùnapop
  - "Fuoco nel fuoco" — Eros Ramazzotti

Best Italian Album

- ...Squérez? — Lùnapop
  - Canzoni a manovella — Vinicio Capossela
  - Esco di rado e parlo ancora meno — Adriano Celentano
  - Stato di necessità — Carmen Consoli
  - Stilelibero — Eros Ramazzotti
  - Microchip emozionale — Subsonica

Best International Female Artist

- Anastacia
  - Macy Gray
  - Jennifer Lopez
  - Madonna
  - Sade

Best International Group

- U2
  - The Beatles
  - Blink 182
  - Coldplay
  - Morcheeba
  - Red Hot Chili Peppers

Best International Male Artist

- Carlos Santana
  - Craig David
  - Eminem
  - Lenny Kravitz
  - Moby

=== Second edition ===
During the second edition of the Italian Music Awards, the number of categories was strongly increased. The biggest winners were Vasco Rossi and Elisa, receiving three awards each.

Best Italian Album

- Stupido hotel — Vasco Rossi
  - Canzoni a manovella — Vinicio Capossela
  - Esco di rado e parlo ancora meno — Adriano Celentano
  - Iperbole — Raf
  - La descrizione di un attimo — Tiromancino

Best Italian Single

- "Luce (Tramonti a nord est)" — Elisa
  - "Infinito" — Raf
  - "Tre parole" — Valeria Rossi
  - "Due destini" — Tiromancino
  - "Io sono Francesco" — Tricarico

Best Italian Female Artist

- Elisa
  - Giorgia
  - Irene Grandi
  - Fiorella Mannoia
  - Mina
  - Valeria Rossi

Best Italian Male Artist

- Vasco Rossi
  - Adriano Celentano
  - Raf
  - Eros Ramazzotti
  - Zucchero

Best Italian Group

- Tiromancino
  - Delta V
  - Otto Ohm
  - 883
  - Velvet

Best Italian Revelation of the Year

- Valeria Rossi
  - Tiziano Ferro
  - Neffa
  - Tiromancino
  - Velvet

Best Italian Videoclip

- "L'ultimo bacio" — Carmen Consoli
  - "Luce (Tramonti a nord est)" — Elisa
  - "Infinito" — Raf
  - "Siamo soli" — Vasco Rossi
  - "Baila" — Zucchero

Best Italian Tour

- Vasco Rossi
  - Vinicio Capossela
  - Carmen Consoli
  - Pino Daniele
  - Eros Ramazzotti

Best Italian Dance Artist

- Gigi D'Agostino
  - Alexia
  - Eiffel 65
  - Planet Funk
  - Spiller

Best Italian Arrangement

- "La mia signorina" — Neffa

Best Italian Lyrics

- "Il cuoco di Salò" — Francesco De Gregori

Best Italian Composition

- "Luce (Tramonti a nord est)" — Elisa

Best Italian Producer

- Manuel Agnelli (ex-aequo)
- Enzo Miceli (ex-aequo)

Best Italian Graphical Project

- Imaginaria — Almamegretta (ex-aequo)
- Iperbole — Raf (ex-aequo)

Best Italian Dance Producer

- Gigi D'Agostino

Best Italian Soundtrack

- Le fate ignoranti

Best International Album

- All That You Can't Leave Behind — U2
  - Born to Do It — Craig David
  - No Angel — Dido
  - Music — Madonna
  - Reveal — R.E.M.

Best International Single

- "Trouble" — Coldplay
  - "Crying at the Discoteque" — Alcazar
  - "Clint Eastwood" — Gorillaz
  - "Don't Tell Me" — Madonna
  - "Me Gustas Tú" — Manu Chao

Best International Female Artist

- Anastacia
  - Björk
  - Dido
  - Macy Gray
  - Madonna

Best International Male Artist

- Lenny Kravitz
  - Craig David
  - Manu Chao
  - Moby
  - Robbie Williams

Best International Group

- U2
  - Coldplay
  - Gorillaz
  - Jamiroquai
  - R.E.M.

=== Third edition ===
The third Italian Music Awards ceremony was held on 2 December 2002, host by Piero Chiambretti. The biggest winner of the year was Daniele Silvestri, who received four awards.

Best Italian Album

- Fuori come va? — Luciano Ligabue
  - Then Comes the Sun — Elisa
  - Rosso relativo — Tiziano Ferro
  - Amorematico — Subsonica
  - Shake — Zucchero

Best Italian Single

- "Salirò" — Daniele Silvestri
  - "Rosso relativo" — Tiziano Ferro
  - "Vivi davvero" — Giorgia
  - "Eri bellissima" — Luciano Ligabue
  - "La rondine" — Mango

Best Italian Female Artist

- Carmen Consoli
  - Alexia
  - Elisa
  - Giorgia
  - Laura Pausini

Best Italian Male Artist

- Luciano Ligabue
  - Tiziano Ferro
  - Mango
  - Francesco Renga
  - Daniele Silvestri
  - Zucchero

Best Italian Group

- Planet Funk
  - Articolo 31
  - Gabin
  - Nomadi
  - Subsonica

Best Italian Revelation of the Year

- Planet Funk
  - Gabin
  - Valentina Giovagnini
  - Moony
  - Yu Yu

Best Italian Videoclip

- "Salirò" — Daniele Silvestri
  - "Vivi davvero" — Giorgia
  - "Stupido hotel" — Vasco Rossi
  - "Nuvole rapide" — Subsonica
  - "Ahum" — Zucchero

Best Italian Tour

- Luciano Ligabue
  - Francesco De Gregori
  - Ron
  - Pino Daniele
  - Fiorella Mannoia
  - Elisa
  - Subsonica
  - Zucchero

Best Italian Dance Artist

- Planet Funk
  - Eiffel 65
  - Gabin
  - Moony
  - Yu Yu

Best Italian Lyrics

- "Quello che non c'è" — Afterhours (ex-aequo)
- "Stupido hotel" — Vasco Rossi (ex-aequo)

Best Italian Arrangement

- "Salirò" — Daniele Silvestri (ex-aequo)
- "Nuvole rapide" — Subsonica (ex-aequo)

Best Italian Composition

- "Salirò" — Daniele Silvestri

Best Italian Producer

- Enzo Miceli

Best Italian Graphical Project

- Amorematico — Subsonica

Best Italian Soundtrack

- Luce dei miei occhi — Ludovico Einaudi

Best Italian Dance Producer

- Molella

Best Synchronization with a TV Spot

- Any Other Name — Thomas Newman and the BMW 3 Series spot

Best International Female Artist

- Anastacia
  - Norah Jones
  - Alicia Keys
  - Kylie Minogue
  - Shakira

Best International Male Artist

- Bruce Springsteen
  - Eminem
  - Lenny Kravitz
  - Moby
  - Robbie Williams

Best International Group

- Red Hot Chili Peppers
  - Coldplay
  - Jamiroquai
  - Morcheeba
  - Noir Désir

Best International Revelation of the Year

- Norah Jones
  - Alicia Keys
  - Las Ketchup
  - Noir Désir
  - Shakira

Classical Award

- Schoenberg: Gurrelieder. Dir. Simon Rattler

Jazz Award

- Footprints Live! — Wayne Shorter

FIMI Special Award — Italian Artist in the World

- Zucchero

FIMI Special Award — Lifetime Achievement Award

- Elton John

Alice Award — Web Artist of the Year

- Lenny Kravitz (ex-aequo)
- Francesco Renga (ex-aequo)

Alice Award — Extraordinary Emotion

- Francesco Renga

RTL Award

- Mark Knopfler

=== Fourth edition ===
The fourth and last edition of the Italian Music Awards was held in December 2003. The biggest winners were Le Vibrazioni, Vasco Rossi and Eros Ramazzotti, receiving two awards each.

Best Italian Female Artist

- Carmen Consoli
  - Elisa
  - Giorgia
  - Irene Grandi
  - Laura Pausini

Best Italian Male Artist

- Eros Ramazzotti
  - Sergio Cammariere
  - Cesare Cremonini
  - Morgan
  - Vasco Rossi

Best Italian Group

- Le Vibrazioni
  - Gemelli Diversi
  - Negrita
  - Planet Funk
  - Subsonica
  - Tiromancino

Best Italian Dance Artist

- Planet Funk
  - Eiffel 65
  - Moony
  - Molella
  - Prezioso

Best Italian Album

- 9 — Eros Ramazzotti
  - L'eccezione — Carmen Consoli
  - Le Vibrazioni — Le Vibrazioni
  - Tracks — Vasco Rossi
  - In continuo movimento — Tiromancino

Best Italian Single

- "Gocce di memoria" — Giorgia
  - "Mary" — Gemelli Diversi
  - "Prima di partire per un lungo viaggio" — Irene Grandi
  - "Dedicato a te" — Le Vibrazioni
  - "Per me è importante" — Tiromancino

Best Italian Revelation of the Year

- Le Vibrazioni
  - Roberto Angelini
  - Sergio Cammariere
  - Dj Francesco
  - Morgan

Best Italian Videoclip

- "Shpalman®" — Elio e le Storie Tese
  - "Gocce di memoria" — Giorgia
  - "Dedicato a te" — Le Vibrazioni
  - "Un'emozione per sempre" — Eros Ramazzotti
  - "Per me è importante" — Tiromancino

Best Italian Tour

- Vasco Rossi
  - Claudio Baglioni
  - Alex Britti
  - Carmen Consoli
  - Giorgia

Best International Female Artist

- Dido
  - Beyoncé
  - Jennifer Lopez
  - Madonna
  - Skin

Best International Male Artist

- Robbie Williams
  - 50 Cent
  - Ben Harper
  - Eminem
  - Bruce Springsteen

Best International Group

- Coldplay
  - Evanescence
  - Simply Red
  - Tribalistas
  - U2

Best International Revelation of the Year

- Tribalistas
  - 50 Cent
  - Evanescence
  - Sean Paul
  - Will Young

FIMI Special Award — Contribution to the Music Industry

- Nomadi

FIMI Special Award — Ambassador of the Italian Music in the World

- Luciano Pavarotti

FIMI Special Award

- Vasco Rossi

RTL 102.5 Special Award

- Alex Britti

Cornetto Free Music Festival Live Special Award

- Simple Mind

== See also ==
- List of Italian music awards
