= L'anfiteatro e la bambina impertinente =

Live album by Carmen Consoli
- Released: 16 November 2001
- Recorded: 15 May 2001
- Venue: Ancient theatre of Taormina
- Length: 57:35
- Label: Universal Music Italia

Carmen Consoli chronology
Stato di necessità (2000)	L'anfiteatro e la bambina impertinente (2001)	L'eccezione (2002)

L'anfiteatro e la bambina impertinente (lit. 'The amphitheatre and the cheeky little girl') is the first live album of Italian singer-songwriter Carmen Consoli, released in 2001.

== Production ==
Consoli's live concert was recorded on 15 July 2001 at the Ancient theatre of Taormina, during the Taormina Arte festival, with Consoli and her band accompanied by the Orchestra of the Vittorio Emanuele II Theatre in Messina conducted by Paolo Buonvino. In addition to her hits, Consoli performed "Amado Mio", Mina's "Nessuno" and a cover version of "Lady Marmalade" mixed with her "Bésame Giuda".

== Release ==
The album was released in CD, DVD and VHS format on 16 November 2001. Artwork was cured by Alberto Bettinetti. The video version is directed by Leonardo Conti and include all the 25 songs performed during the concert as well as backstage bonuses and an interview with Consoli.

Consoli promoted the album with two concerts, at the Accademia Nazionale di Santa Cecilia in Rome on 28 November and at Leoncavallo in Milan on 1 December 2001.

== Reception ==
The album was a commercial success, selling over 200,000 copies.

== Track listing ==
No.	Title	Writer(s)	Length
1.	"Per niente stanca"	Carmen Consoli	5:23
2.	"Parole di burro"	Consoli	3:57
3.	"Venere"	Consoli	4:36
4.	"Blunotte"	Consoli	4:18
5.	"Geisha"	Consoli	3:15
6.	"L'ultimo bacio"	Consoli	3:52
7.	"In bianco e nero"	Consoli	4:21
8.	"Confusa e felice"	Consoli	4:20
9.	"Equilibrio precario"	Consoli	3:45
10.	"Bonsai #2"	Consoli	1:12
11.	"Amore di plastica"	Consoli, Mario Venuti	3:58
12.	"In funzione di nessuna logica"	Consoli	3:28
13.	"Amado mio"	Allan Roberts, Doris Fisher	2:18
14.	"Quattordici luglio"	Consoli	4:06
15.	"Contessa Miseria"	Consoli	4:46

== Charts ==
Chart	Peak position
Italy (FIMI)	6
