= Davide Dileo =

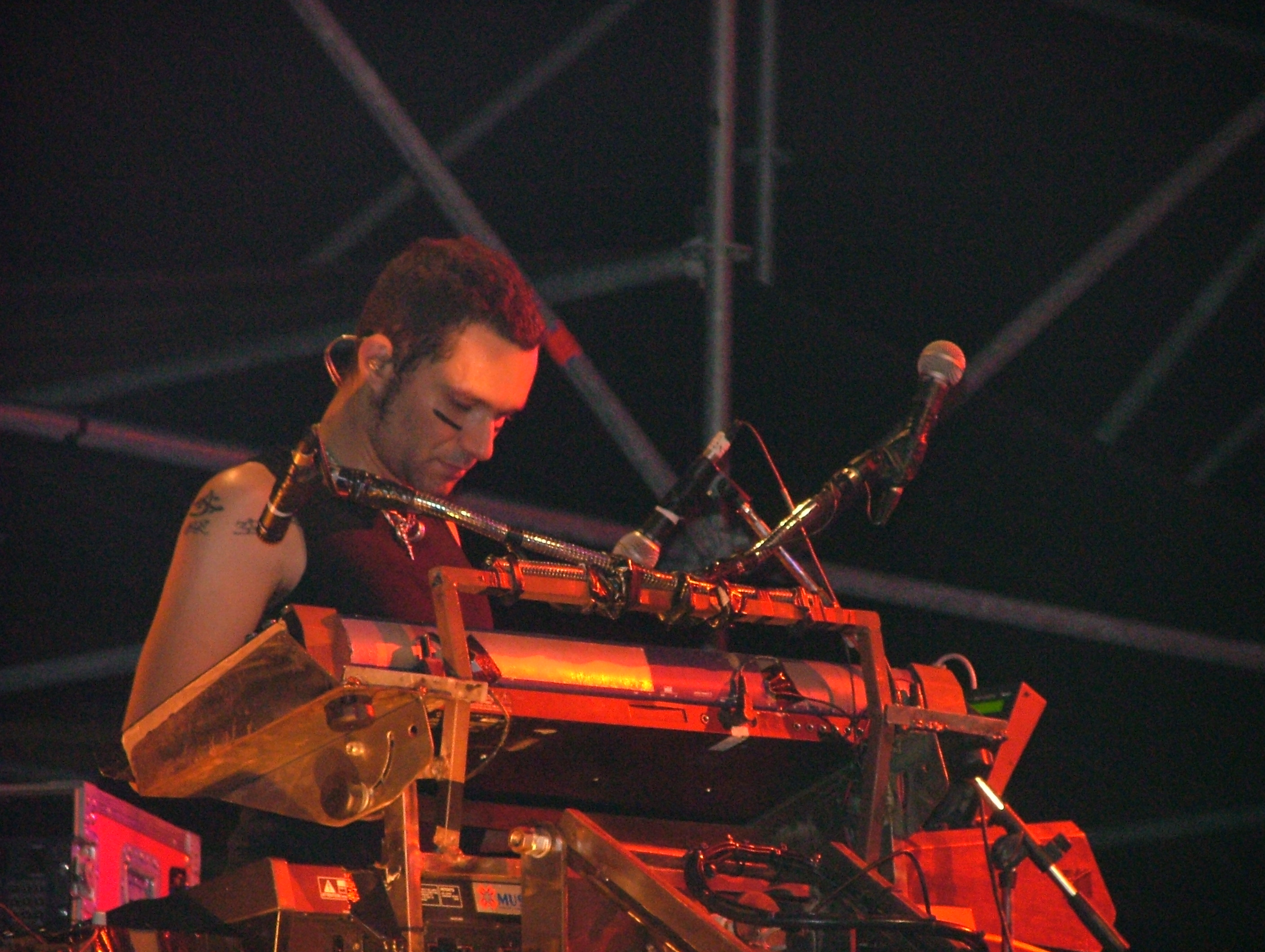
- Dileo in 2005

Background information
- Also known as: Boosta
- Born: 27 September 1974 (age 51); Turin, Piedmont, Italy
- Genres: Electronic; alternative rock; alternative pop; pop rock; synth pop; EDM; tech house
- Occupations: Disc jockey; musician; composer; author
- Instrument: keyboards
- Years active: 1996–present
- Website: davidedileo.com

Davide Dileo (born 27 September 1974), also known as Boosta, is an Italian author, singer, composer, DJ, writer, and television host, known for his unique blend of classical piano and electronic music. Born in Turin, Dileo showed a disposition for music from a young age. Since then, he has performed at some of Italy's most prestigious music festivals and venues, finding fame as the co-founder of the alternative rock band Subsonica in 1996.

Dileo's musical style is characterised by his innovative use of technology, which he blends with training from the Conservatory in Turin, to create a unique sound that is both modern and timeless. He is especially noted for his virtuosity on the piano and keyboards, which he uses to explore a wide range of musical genres; from classical to post rock and electronic.

== Subsonica ==
Dileo is keyboardist and co-founder of the biggest underground alternative rock band to emerge from the late 90's in Italy: Subsonica. Together they recorded 8 studio albums, including 8 platinum records, sold more than 1,000,000 copies, released 4 live CDs and the band continues to enjoy a successful live career. In addition to this, the band won numerous awards and recognitions such as: Premio Amnesty Italia, MTV Europe Music Award, Premio Italiano della Musica, Italian Music Awards, Premio Grinzane Cavour, TRL Award and participated in the Sanremo Festival in 2000.

=== Subsonica discography ===
- 2020 – Mentale Strumentale (RCA)
- 2019 – Microchip Temporale (Sony Music)
- 2018 – 8 (Sony Music/Columbia)
- 2015 – Una Nave in Una Foresta Dal Vivo (Universal Music Group)
- 2014 – Una Nave in Una Foresta (Universal Music Group/Universal Music)
- 2011 – Eden (EMI/Virgin Music)
- 2007 – L’Eclissi (EMI/Virgin)
- 2006 – Terrestre Live (EMI)
- 2005 – Terrestre (EMI/Virgin)
- 2002 – Amorematico (Mescal)
- 1999 – Microchip Emozionale (Mescal)
- 1997 – Subsonica (Mescal)

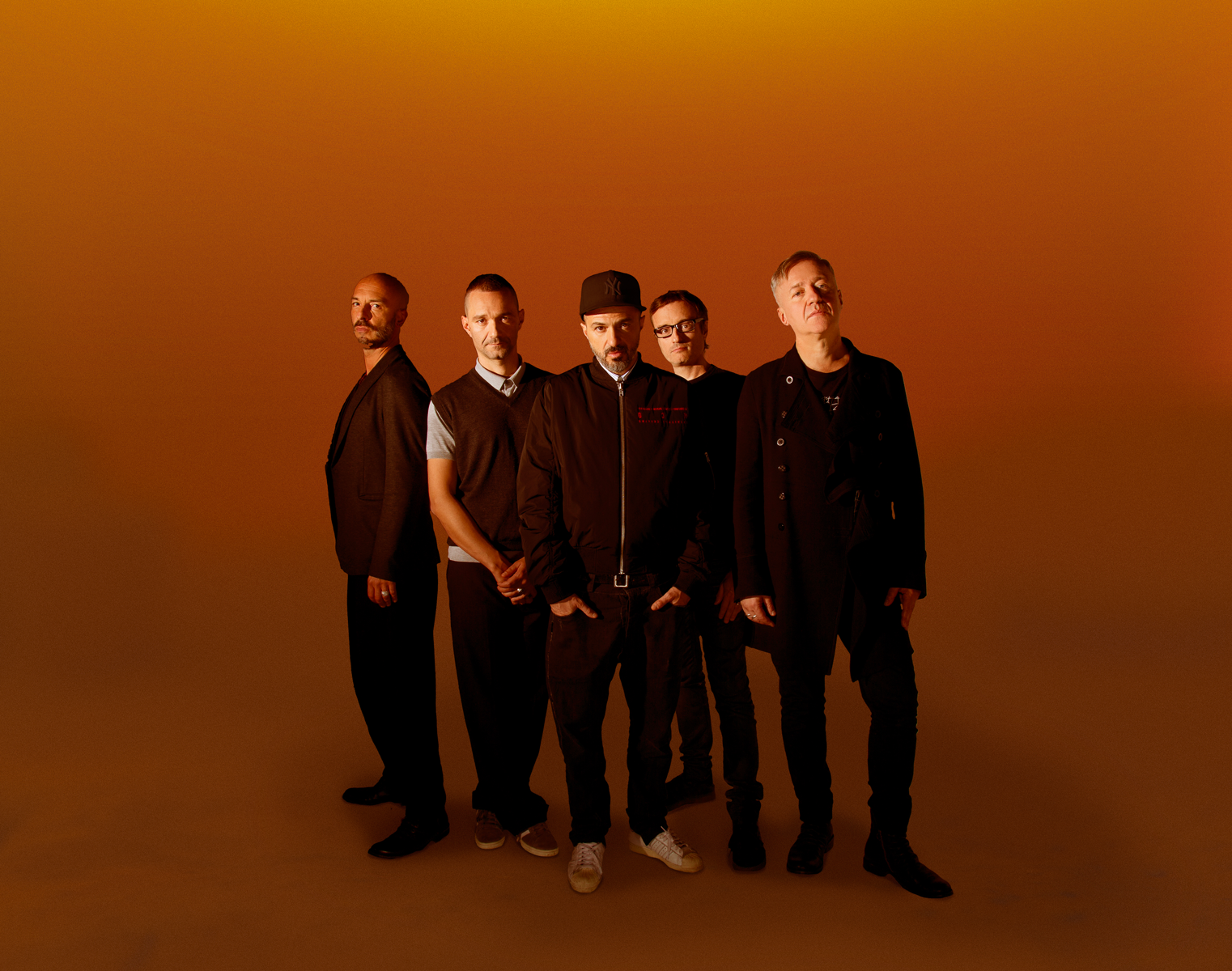
Subsonica: Davide "Boosta" Dileo (keyboards), Luca "Vicio" Vicini (bass), Samuel Umberto Romano (vocals), Massimiliano "C-Max" Casacci (guitar) and Enrico "Ninja" Matta (drums).

== Solo work ==
With the spirit of a "musical cartographer" Dileo's latest solo works, “Post Piano Sessions”, released in 2022 received critical acclaim for its innovative twist on electronic music. The six instrumental EPs explore the many variations and expressive possibilities of the piano, featuring pieces that range from the avant-guard to post rock. The 6 individual EPs explore through piano and electronics; the genres of post rock, 20th century composition (or decomposition thereof), a Schönbergian approach to music, followed by an electronic almost minimal techno and finally a reference to the ambient 70's and the world of Harold Budd and Brian Eno.

All tracks however showcase Dileo's unique compositional style.

In addition to his solo work, Dileo is also active in the music community, collaborating with a range of artists from different genres and backgrounds. As a songwriter and composer, he has written many songs for Subsonica as well as for other artists including Mina, Malika Ayane, Enrico Ruggeri, and Skunk Anansie's; Skin. He has also collaborated with the likes of Depeche Mode and Placebo and has crossed over into other musical genres such as drum and bass, collaborating with Atmos T.

=== Solo albums ===
- 2020 – Facile (Warner Music)
- 2016 – La Stanza Intelligente (Columbia, Sony Music)

=== Solo singles and EPs ===
- 2022 – Post Piano Sessions (Torino Recording Club)
- 2013 – Boosta (feat. Litfiba – L’immortale) (Warner Music Italia)
- 2006 – Jump in a Black Silk Flow (Ocean Dark)
- 2006 – Boostology EP (Mantra Vibes)
- 2006 – Dance is Dead (Mantra Vibes)
- 2005 – The Boss (Mantra Vibes)
- 2004 – Crash (Dance Factory)

=== Compilations ===
- 2017 – La Stanza Intelligente EP: TV Series by Sky: 1992 1993 (Columbia, Sony Music)
- 2004 – Electro Dancehall (Trend Discotec)

=== Collaborations ===
- Stalker (composed together with Andrea Bertolini)
- Happy Sundays (composed together with Play Paul)
- The Last Icon (composed by the artist and sung together with Skin)
- Non ti voglio più (composed for the album Facile of Mina)
- La clessidra (composed for the album Caramella of Mina)
- Il mare d'inverno (cover sung together with Ruggeri for Le canzoni ai testimoni)
- Sei (composed for Jessica Brando)

== Caesar Palace ==
Italian rock band Caesar Palace formed in 2008 consisting of Davide 'Boosta' Dileo (from Subsonica), Davide Pavanello (from Linea 77) and Christian Montanarella (from Linea 77). Their debut album "Dogs from V-Gas" was released in 2008.

Thanks to his continued passion for the arts he opened the Davide_Dileo_Cabinet in Turin, an exhibition gallery where music becomes art and is transformed into NFT collectibles which have been installed in some of the most iconic places in Italy.

Dileo's innovative approach to music with his band Subsonica and solo work has won him a large and dedicated following, and he continues to tour and perform globally, spreading his message of musical innovation and collaboration. He has also been recognised for his contributions to the music community, receiving several awards and honours.

In addition to his musical work, Dileo is also an active philanthropist, using his platform to raise awareness and support for a range of social causes. He has supported organisations such as ABIO: Association per il Bambino in Ospedale; an Italian organisation to support children in hospital. the “Associazione Nazionale Italiana Cantanti” ( Italian National Singers Association), with the aim of promoting and supporting solidarity projects, works and interventions for the protection of those most in need. Dileo has also continuously supported through volunteering his experience and expertise, emerging artists and musicians.

Overall, Davide "Boosta" Dileo is an inspiring and innovative musician who has made a lasting impact on the world of classical, alternative rock and electronic music in Italy. With his unique sound, virtuosic piano playing, and passion for collaboration and social activism, he has established himself as one of the most prolific and respected Italian musicians of his generation.
