= Domani 21/04.09 =

Single by Artisti Uniti per l'Abruzzo
- Released: 6 May 2009
- Recorded: 21 April 2009; Officine Meccaniche Recording Studios, Milan, Italy
- Genre: Pop; hip hop; pop rock
- Length: 6:12
- Label: Sugar Music
- Songwriter: Mauro Pagani
- Producers: Mauro Pagani, Marco Sorrentino

"Domani 21/04.09" is a charity single released by the supergroup Artisti Uniti per l'Abruzzo in 2009. The project supported the victims of the 2009 L'Aquila earthquake. The song is a cover of Mauro Pagani's "Domani", included in his 2003 album with the same title.

It received its first radio play on 6 May 2009 at 3:32, exactly one month after the L'Aquila earthquake. After peaking at number one on the Italian Singles Chart for 12 consecutive weeks, it became the best-selling single of the year in the country, receiving multiple-platinum certification by the Federation of the Italian Music Industry.

== Background and recording ==
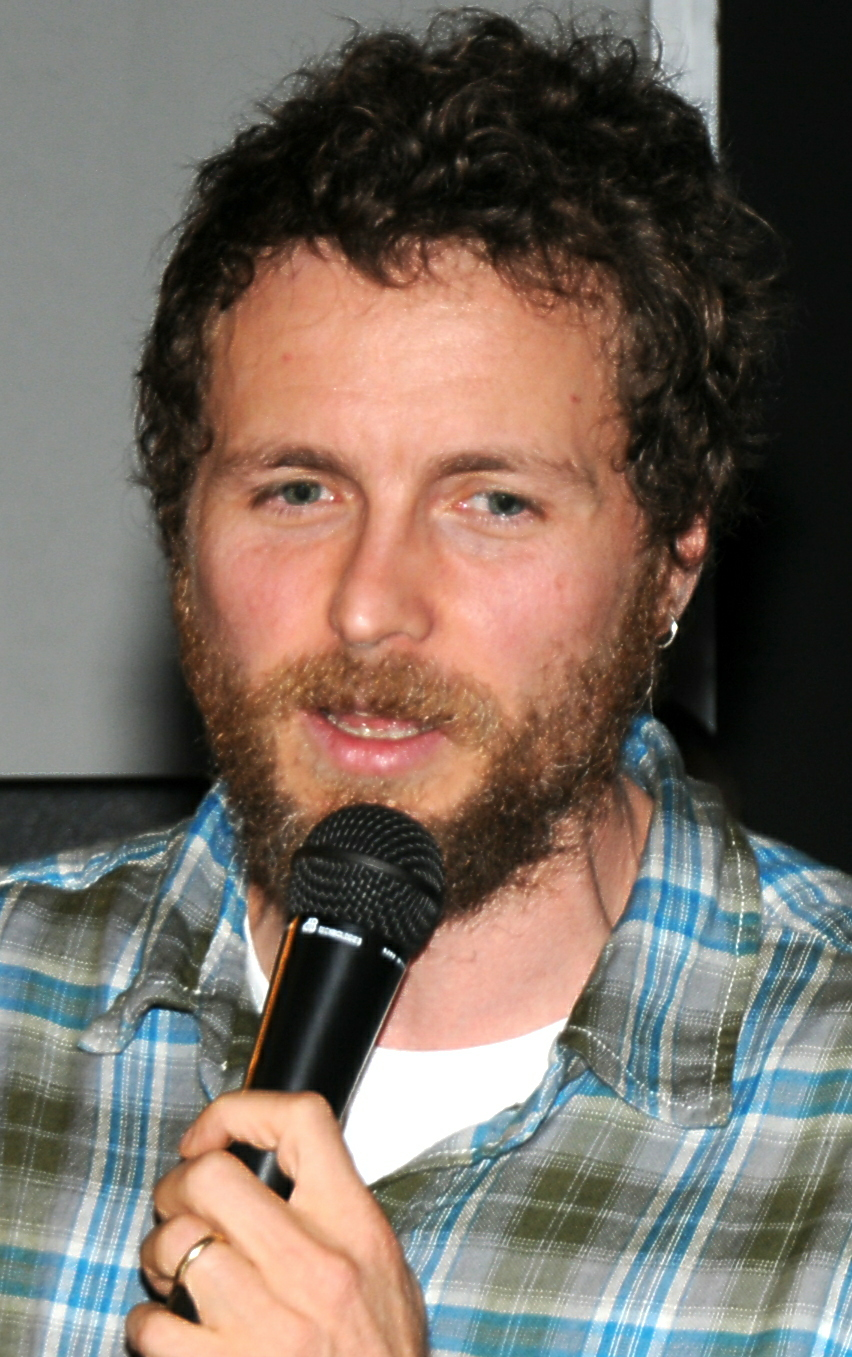
Jovanotti had the idea of starting a project in support of the reconstruction of L'Aquila.

On 6 April 2009, an earthquake occurred in the region of Abruzzo, in central Italy, causing the death of more than 300 people. Wanting to support the reconstruction of the city, Italian singer Jovanotti decided to call his colleague and friend Giuliano Sangiorgi, leader of the band Negramaro. Sangiorgi later declared:

"We were thinking of what we could do, because for the first time the scenes broadcast by televisions didn't look distant, but extremely close to us and painful. In the beginning, we were thinking of a concert, but it looked to be something too 'joyous' in front of such a tragedy. Therefore, we thought we could record a song, calling Mauro [Pagani] as the producer, in order to avoid doing things too close to the disaster."

A few minutes later, Mauro Pagani was contacted and accepted to collaborate to the project. During the following days, the number of involved artists grew up to 56 different acts. Other artists, including Ivano Fossati, Fiorella Mannoia, and Subsonica, had to decline the invitation because they could not reach the remaining acts in Milan during the recording session of the song, which was decided to be held in one single place, the Officine Meccaniche Recording Studio in Milan, during one single day, 21 April 2009.

According to Jovanotti and Sangiorgi, the atmosphere during the recording process was "joyous and creative as if we were in a group of students. It looked like a demonstration. A historic day, or better, a dreamlike day."

== Commercial performance ==
During the week ending on 14 May 2009, the song debuted at number one on the Italian Singles Chart, later holding the top spot for 12 consecutive weeks. During the week of 9 August 2009, the single fell to number two, behind "When Love Takes Over" by David Guetta and Kelly Rowland. It left the top twenty in mid-September 2009, after 18 consecutive weeks on the chart. According to the charts compiled by Nielsen for the Federation of the Italian Music Industry, "Domani 21/04.09" was the best-selling digital single of 2009 in Italy. The single was also certified multi-platinum for domestic downloads exceeding 60,000 units. In April 2010, it was announced that the single had sold 450,000 physical copies and 74,000 digital copies in Italy.

On 17 May 2009, the song also entered at number two on the Italian Music Control Airplay Chart, compiled by Nielsen, behind Gianna Nannini's "Attimo". During its second week, the song fell to number five, and it held the fifth spot in the week of 31 May 2009 too. On 7 June 2009, the song left the airplay top 5.

== Track listing ==
- CD Single
1. "Domani 21/04.09" – 6:12
2. "Domani 21/04.09" (Instrumental) – 6:12
- Download
1. "Domani 21/04.09" – 6:12

== Personnel ==
Artisti Uniti per l'Abruzzo

- Afterhours
- Claudio Baglioni
- Franco Battiato
- Baustelle
- Samuele Bersani
- Bluvertigo
- Luca Carboni
- Caparezza
- Albano Carrisi
- Caterina Caselli
- Casino Royale
- Carmen Consoli
- Cesare Cremonini
- Dolcenera
- Elisa
- Elio e le Storie Tese
- Niccolò Fabi
- Fabri Fibra
- Giusy Ferreri
- Tiziano Ferro
- Eugenio Finardi
- Frankie Hi-NRG MC
- Giorgia
- Gianluca Grignani
- J-Ax
- Jovanotti
- Ligabue
- Malika Ayane
- Mango
- Gianni Maroccolo
- Marracash
- Morgan
- Gianni Morandi
- Gianna Nannini
- Negramaro
- Negrita
- Nek
- Niccolò Agliardi
- Pacifico
- Mauro Pagani
- Giuliano Palma
- Laura Pausini
- Roy Paci
- Piero Pelù
- Max Pezzali
- Massimo Ranieri
- Francesco Renga
- Ron
- Enrico Ruggeri
- Antonella Ruggiero
- Sud Sound System
- Tricarico
- Roberto Vecchioni
- Antonello Venditti
- Mario Venuti
- Zucchero

Musicians

- Saturnino Celani – bass guitar
- Cesareo (from Elio e le Storie Tese) – guitar
- Vittorio Cosma – Hammond organ
- Eros Cristiani – piano
- Joe Damiani – drums
- Franco "Francky" Li Causi (from Negrita) – bass guitar
- Cesare Mac Petricich (from Negrita) – guitar
- Andrea Mariano (from Negramaro) – keyboards
- Riccardo Onori – guitar
- Roy Paci – trumpet
- Mauro Pagani – violin
- Emanuele Spedicato (from Negramaro) – guitar
- Danilo Tasco (from Negramaro) – percussion instruments

Production

- Guido Andreani – engineer
- Antonio Baglio – mastering
- Jacopo Dorici – assistant
- Taketo Gohara – engineer
- Jovanotti – co-producer
- Mauro Pagani – producer
- Pino Pischetola – mixing
- Giuliano Sangiorgi – co-producer
- Marco Sorrentino – executive producer

== Charts ==
=== Weekly charts ===
Chart (2009)	Peak position
Italy Airplay (Nielsen Music Control)	2
Italy Digital Singles (FIMI)	1

=== Year end charts ===
Chart (2009)	Position
Italy Digital Singles (FIMI)	1

== Release history ==
Region	Date	Format	Label
Italy	6 May 2009	Airplay	Sugar Music
Italy	8 May 2009	Digital download	Sugar Music
Italy	15 May 2009	CD single	Sugar Music
