= L'eccezione =

L'eccezione may refer to:

- L'eccezione (album), Carmen Consoli album, 2002
- "L'eccezione" (Carmen Consoli song), 2002
- "L'eccezione" (Madame song), 2022
