= Indirizzo portoghese =

Studio album by Patrizia Laquidara
- Released: 2003
- Genre: Pop music
- Length: 45:23
- Label: Virgin Records / Genius Records
- Producer: Renato Venturiero

Patrizia Laquidara chronology
Para você querido Caé (2001)	Indirizzo portoghese (2003)	Funambola (2007)

Singles from Indirizzo portoghese
- 1. "Indirizzo portoghese" 2. "Agisce"; 3. "Lividi e fioril" 4. "Per causa d'amore"

Indirizzo portoghese is the second album of the Italian singer Patrizia Laquidara, released in 2003 by Genius Records/Virgin Records. It includes 13 songs.

== Tracks ==
1. Mielato - 3.16 - (P. Laquidara - A. Canto, Bungaro)
2. Indirizzo portoghese - 3.31 - (P. Laquidara - P. Laquidara, A. Canto)
3. Caotico - 3.14 - (P. Laquidara - A. Canto)
4. Dentro qui - 3.55 - (P. Laquidara - A. Canto, P. Laquidara)
5. Sciroppo di mirtilli - 3.58 - (P. Laquidara - A. Canto)
6. Kanzi - 3.40 - (P. Laquidara - D. Sarno, Bungaro)
7. Agisce - 3.36 - (P. Laquidara - Bungaro)
8. Le rose - 3.14 - (G. Lapi - F. Mesolella, F. Spinetti)
9. Essenzialmente - 2.51 - (P. Laquidara - P. Baù)
10. Per causa d'amore - 3.35 - (Kaballà - M. Venuti)
11. Uirapuro - 2.56 - (H. Valdemar)
12. Lividi e fiori - 3.54 - (A. Romanelli, P. Laquidara - Bungaro, P. Laquidara)
13. Cu cu rru cu cù paloma - 3.45 - (T. Méndez)

== Singles ==
- Indirizzo portoghese
- Agisce, also in the Portuguese version titled Age, was used by a radio program on national network Rai Radio Uno.
- Lividi e fiori, participating to the 2003 edition of the Sanremo festival, where it won the Critics Prize and the Best Interpretation Prize.
- Per causa d'amore, used also in a musical video.

== Trivia ==
The song "Kanzi" was inspired by the bonobo named this way, grown up and studied at the university of Georgia and able to communicate with human beings with a complex symbolic language.
