= Indifferenze =

In differenze

Studio album by Susanna Parigi
- Released: 2004
- Genre: Pop music
- Label: Sette Ottavi
- Producer: Vince Tempera, Susanna Parigi

Susanna Parigi chronology
| Scomposta (1999) | In differenze (2004) | L'insulto delle parole (2009) |

In differenze is an album by Italian singer Susanna Parigi, released in 2004 by Sette Ottavi. It includes 14 tracks and was made with collaborations of prestigious hosts: Pat Metheny, Tony Levin, the Symphony Orchestra of Sofia, Hellas Bandini, Ares Tavolazzi, Flaco Biondini, Mario Arcari and philosopher Umberto Galimberti, who co-wrote the lyrics of "False" and wrote the monologues homonymous of show, presented between 2004 and 2006 at sites such as Colosseo in Rome, Teatro dell'Arte di Milano, Teatro Puccini of Florence, Teatro dele Celebrazioni in Bologna and Theater dell'Archivolto in Genoa. The album cover shows a photo given to the author by photographer Sebastião Salgado.

In the same year, Parigi was considered by Italian press as a revelation of the music scene, including social issues that she discussed on the album songs: indifference as amputation of the senses in our west world, respect and love for the differences.

== Track listing ==
1. "Opera buffa" (3:24) – (Susanna Parigi / Susanna Parigi e Kaballà)
2. "La fatica e la pazienza" (3:32) – (Susanna Parigi e Vergati / Susanna Parigi e Kaballà)
3. "Amada" (5:11) – (Juan Carlos Biondini / Susanna Parigi e Kaballà)
4. "Più grandi di Dio" (4:22) – (Susanna Parigi / Susanna Parigi e Kaballà)
5. "In differenze" (4:18) – (Susanna Parigi / Susanna Parigi e Kaballà)
6. "Una porta nel tempo" (3:26) – (Susanna Parigi)
7. "Amore che m'invita" (3:24) – (Susanna Parigi / Susanna Parigi e Kaballà)
8. "Di spazio perfetto" (4:42) – (Pat Metheny / Susanna Parigi e Kaballà)
9. "False" (3:18) – (Susanna Parigi / Susanna Parigi, Umberto Galimberti e Kaballà)
10. "Dall'anima al corpo" (3:54) – (Susanna Parigi)
11. "Una stagione all'inferno" (4:08) – (Susanna Parigi / Susanna Parigi e Kaballà)
12. "42.3%" (4:25) – (Susanna Parigi / Susanna Parigi e Kaballà)
13. "Le valigie che lasci" (2:42) – (Susanna Parigi)
14. "Cinì Cinì" (5:45) – (Susanna Parigi / Susanna Parigi e Kaballà)
