= Due parole =

Studio album by Carmen Consoli
- Released: 26 February 1996
- Genre: Pop rock
- Length: 41:37
- Label: Cyclope; Polydor
- Producer: Francesco Virlinzi; Allan Goldberg

Carmen Consoli chronology
Due parole (1996)	Confusa e felice (1997)

Due parole (lit. 'Two words') is the debut studio album by Italian singer-songwriter Carmen Consoli.

It was released after Consoli's participation in the 46th edition of the Sanremo Music Festival with the song "Amore di plastica", and also include the debut single of Consoli, "Quello che sento". The third single was "Lingua a sonagli", of which was also released a music video, directed by Dominic DeJoseph and shot in Venice, while "Questa notte una lucciola illumina la mia finestra" was only released as promotional single. The song "Sulla mia pelle" was inspired by Dacia Maraini's novel The Silent Duchess and was also featured in the 1998 charity album Canzoni per loro.

The album was produced by Francesco Virlinzi on the basis of a tape with 22 "voice and guitar" demos that Consoli had given to him. Mario Venuti and Kaballà collaborated to the composition of some songs. It was recorded and mixed by Allan Goldberg in his studio "The Music Terminal". It was runner-up at Targa Tenco in the best debut album category.

In March 2021, on occasion of its 25th anniversary, the album was reissued, and it was also released in vinyl for the first time.

== Track listing ==
No.	Title	Writer(s)	Length
1.	"Amore di plastica"	Carmen Consoli; Mario Venuti	4:04
2.	"Questa notte una lucciola illumina la mia finestra"	Consoli	2:50
3.	"Sulla mia pelle"	Consoli	3:00
4.	"Posso essere felice"	Consoli	3:14
5.	"Lingua a sonagli"	Consoli	2:43
6.	"Non ti ho mai chiesto"	Consoli; Francesco Virlinzi; Kaballà	4:03
7.	"Vorrei dire"	Consoli	3:29
8.	"La stonato"	Consoli	3:14
9.	"Nell'apparenza"	Consoli	3:47
10.	"La semplicità" (feat. Mario Venuti)	Consoli	3:14
11.	"Quello che sento"	Consoli	3:41
12.	"Fino a quando"	Consoli; Kaballà	4:14

== Charts ==
Chart (2021)	Peak position
Italy (FIMI)	59
