= Luca Madonia =

Italian singer-songwriter

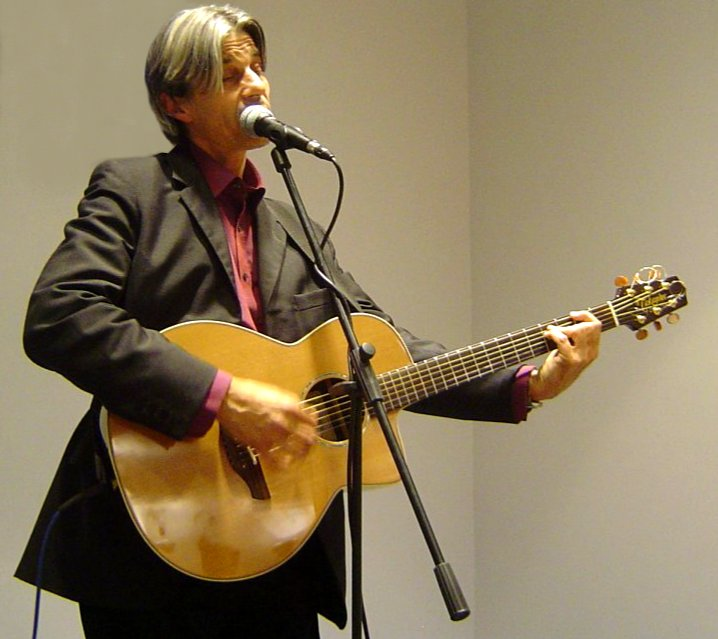
- Born: 4 June 1957 (age 69); Catania
- Occupation: singer-songwriter

Luca Madonia (born 4 June 1957) is an Italian singer-songwriter and musician.

== Life and career ==
Born in Catania, he started his career as a member of the new wave band Denovo. After the group disbanded, he debuted as a solo singer-songwriter, releasing several critically acclaimed albums. As a songwriter he collaborated with several artists, including Andrea Mirò, Patty Pravo, and Gianni Morandi. As a singer, he made duets with Franco Battiato, Carmen Consoli, Grazia Di Michele and Mario Venuti, among others. His single "La consuetudine" was the theme song of the Radio Rai program Hobo.

== Discography ==
- 1991 – Passioni e manie
- 1993 – Bambolina
- 1994 – Moto perpetuo
- 2000 – Solo (EP)
- 2002 – La consuetudine
- 2003 – Cinque minuti e poi (EP)
- 2004 – L'essenziale (Anthology)
- 2006 – Vulnerabile
- 2008 – Parole contro parole
- 2011 – L'alieno
- 2015 – La Monotonia dei giorni
- 2017 - Il tempo è dalla mia parte
- 2019 - La piramide
