= Scomposta =

Studio album by Susanna Parigi
- Released: 1999
- Genre: Pop music
- Label: Nuova Carisch
- Producer: Vince Tempera

Susanna Parigi chronology
Susanna Parigi (1995)	Scomposta (1999)	Indifferenze (2004)

Scomposta is an album by Italian singer Susanna Parigi, released in 1999 by Nuova Carisch. It includes 11 tracks featuring collaborations with the musician Kaballà and philosopher Umberto Galimberti.

== Track listing ==
1. Gli occhi che ci guardano (4'12")
2. La decima porta (4'52")
3. Il regalo (3'54")
4. Tre passi indietro (4'31")
5. Il doppio segreto (5'10")
6. Amelia Earhart (3'24")
7. Eresia d'amore (4'14")
8. Zone di confine (4'41")
9. Scomposta (4'36")
10. Il canto dell'amante (5'53")
11. La decima porta (3'19"; così com'è nata nella notte del 16 luglio 1998 alle ore 2,30)
