= L'insulto delle parole =

Studio album by Susanna Parigi
- Released: 2009
- Genre: Pop
- Label: Promo Music

Susanna Parigi chronology
Indifferenze (2004)	L'insulto delle parole (2009)

L'insulto delle parole is the fourth album released by the Italian singer Susanna Parigi.

It was published in 2009 by Promo Music.

The album sees the participation of the quartet of arches Arkè String Quartet (excluded a Jacques Brel's song cover, “La canzone dei vecchi amanti”, that was arranged by Vince Tempera). The album includes a video clip that collects the testimonies of Pino Arlacchi, Corrado Augias, Lella Costa, Cesare Fiumi, Kaballà, Leonardo Manera, Andrea Pinketts e Bruno Renzi, to which Marco Travaglio has joined successively, about the topic of the title of the album: the excessive and often gross use of the language and the manipulation of the dictionary, changing the name to things and facts or altering of the essence maintaining the name, generating so the constant insult of the truth. It includes 11 songs, including 1 video clip.

== Tracks ==
1. L'insulto delle parole (3'26") - (Susanna Parigi / Susanna Parigi e Kaballà)
2. Non chiedermi parole d'amore (3'38") - (Susanna Parigi / Susanna Parigi e Kaballà)
3. Fa niente (4'16") - (Susanna Parigi)
4. L'attenzione (4'07") - (Susanna Parigi / Susanna Parigi e Kaballà)
5. La fiorista (4'36") - (Susanna Parigi / Susanna Parigi e Kaballà)
6. Il raro movimento (3'46") - (Susanna Parigi / Susanna Parigi e Kaballà)
7. C'è bisogno di tempo (3'55") - (Susanna Parigi)
8. La canzone dei vecchi amanti (4'55") - (cover de "La chanson des vieux amants" di Jacques Brel / Gérard Jouannest / Sergio Bardotti / Duilio Del Prete)
9. Una basta (3'48") - (Susanna Parigi)
10. L'applauso (5'50") - (Susanna Parigi / Susanna Parigi e Kaballà)
11. Clip video: L'insulto delle parole (8'55") - (pensieri di Pino Arlacchi, Corrado Augias, Lella Costa, Cesare Fiumi, Kaballà, Leonardo Manera, Andrea Pinketts e Bruno Renzi)
