= Numb (Linea 77 album) =

Studio album by Linea 77
- Released: May 2003
- Recorded: Red House Studios, Senigallia, Italy
- Genre: Nu metal
- Length: 43:14
- Label: Earache Records
- Producer: Alan "Haggis" Haggerty; Linea 77

Linea 77 chronology
Ket.ch.up Sui.ci.de (2001)	Numb (2003)	Available for Propaganda (2005)

Singles from Numb
- 1. "Fantasma" Released: 2003; 2. "Third Moon" Released: 2003; 3. "66 (diabolus in musica)" Released: 2004

Numb is the third studio album from the Italian nu metal band Linea 77.

== Track listing ==
1. "Venus" - 3:53
2. "Insane Lovers" - 3:32
3. "Fantasma" (Ghost) - 3:39
4. "Warhol" (feat. Aretuska's BrasSicilian) - 3:38
5. "Ants" - 3:13
6. "66 (diabolus in musica)" (feat. Subsonica) - 4:26
7. "Third Moon" - 4:25
8. "I Fall Asleep" - 3:36
9. "Houdini" - 3:32
10. "New World Soccer" - 4:06
11. "Alienation Is the New Form of Zen" - 5:14

== Charts ==
Chart performance for Numb
Chart (2003)	Peak position
Italian Albums (FIMI)	37
