= Funambola =

Studio album by Patrizia Laquidara
- Released: April 14, 2007
- Genre: Pop music
- Length: 50:38
- Label: Ponderosa Music&Art
- Producer: Arto Lindsay, Patrick Dillett

Patrizia Laquidara chronology
Indirizzo portoghese (2003)	Funambola (2007)	Il canto dell'Anguana (to be released)

Singles from Funambola
- 1. "Le cose" Released: 2007; 2. "Ziza" Released: 2008; 3. "Personaggio" Released: 2008

Funambola is an album of the Italian singer Patrizia Laquidara, released in 2007 by Ponderosa Music&Art. It includes 13 songs and it is inspired by the French tightrope walker Philippe Petit, who walked on a steel wire between the Twin Towers of New York City.

Tightrope walking has this time both a physical and an intimate meaning, as a never ending research of a mental equilibrium, perhaps lasting, when found, only the space of a morning.
Intimate thought and introspection are actually the main themes of Patrizia Laquidara's songs.

== Tracks ==
1. Pioggia senza zucchero – 3.36 – (P. Laquidara)
2. Se qualcuno – 3.45 – (P. Laquidara, A. Canto)
3. Senza pelle – 4.00 – (G. Casale – R. Tarantino)
4. Nuove confusioni – 4.00 – (P. Laquidara)
5. L'equilibrio è un miracolo – 4.08 – (P. Laquidara, E. Cirillo – A. Canto)
6. Le cose – 3.08 – (P. Laquidara, Kaballà – P. Laquidara, G. Mancini)
7. Addosso – 3.20 – (P. Laquidara – A. Canto)
8. Ziza – 3.49 – (A. Canto, P. Laquidara – A. Canto)
9. Chiaro e gelido mattino – 4.12
10. Oppure no – 2.57 – (P. Laquidara, A. Canto)
11. Va dove il mondo va – 4.22 – (G. Fabbris – J. Barbieri)
12. Personaggio – 5.07 – (A. M. Lindsay, M. Gibbs, Kassin – adatt. in italiano P. Laquidara, L. Gemma)
13. Noite e luar – 4.14 – (P. Laquidara)

== Singles ==
- Le cose, released in 2007.
- Ziza, released in 2008, was also used for a video and to present the Lisbon concert in 2009, during the Festa do Cinema Italiano film festival.
- Personaggio, released in 2008, was also the soundtrack of the presentation spot of the Festa do Cinema Italiano film festival (Lisbon and Porto).

== Soundtracks ==
- Noite e luar, in Manuale d'amore, directed by Giovanni Veronesi, released in 2005.
