= L'ultimo bacio =

L'ultimo bacio (Italian for 'The last kiss') may refer to:

- "L'ultimo bacio" (song), a 2000 song by Carmen Consoli
- L'ultimo bacio (film), a 2001 film by Gabriele Muccino
