= Caesar Palace =

Italian rock band

- Origin: Turin
- Genres: Alternative rock
- Label: Universal Music
- Members: Boosta; Dade; Tozzo
- Website: Official Website

Caesar Palace is an Italian rock band that was formed in 2008. Their debut album was released at the end of 2008. The band was the successful mix of some elements from two Italian bands that are both from Turin, Subsonica and Linea 77.

== Members ==
- Boosta (Davide Dileo) (from Subsonica) - vocalist and keyboardist
- Dade (Davide Pavanello) (from Linea 77) - bassist
- Tozzo (Christian Montanarella) (from Linea 77) - drummer

== Discography ==
=== Albums ===
Dogs from V-Gas

Studio album
- Released: October 3, 2008
- Label: Black Out

- Dogs from V-Gas
1. Luxury Lark - 4:44
2. Martyr Mask - 3:41
3. 1ne - 3:40
4. In Nebula - 2:01
5. Red Sofa Vampire - 3:51
6. Firedoll - 3:59
7. 12 A.M. in V-Gas - 4:36
8. My Ring - 3:48
9. End of (the) Galaxy - 2:11
10. God and Ants - 2:55
11. Spiders from (the) Sky - 4:14
12. U.F.O. - 2:13

=== Singles ===
- 2008 1ne
- 2009 God and Ants
