= Para você querido Caé =

Studio album by Patrizia Laquidara
- Released: 2001
- Genre: Bossa nova
- Label: Velut Luna / Audio Records

Patrizia Laquidara chronology
Para você querido Caé (2001)	Indirizzo portoghese (2003)

Para você querido Caé is the first album released by the Italian singer Patrizia Laquidara.

It was published in 2001 by Velut Luna/Audio Records.

It is dedicated to the Brazilian singer Caetano Veloso and includes 16 songs of Brazilian music.

== Tracks ==
1. O ciúme (intro)
2. Você é linda
3. Sampa
4. Carolina
5. Itapuá
6. A tua presença, Morena
7. Eu sei que vou te amar
8. Coração vagabundo
9. O cu do mundo
10. E preciso perdoar
11. Cucurrucucú
12. Lindeza
13. Cajuina
14. Meditação
15. O ciúme
16. Minha voz, minha vida
