= Elettra (album) =

Studio album by Carmen Consoli
- Released: 30 October 2009
- Length: 38:06
- Label: Narciso; Universal Music Group
- Producer: Francesco Barbaro; Carmen Consoli; Massimo Roccaforte; Gianluca Vaccaro

Carmen Consoli chronology
| Eva contro Eva (2006) | Elettra (2009) | L'abitudine di tornare (2015) |

Singles from Elettra
- 1. "Non molto lontano da qui" Released: 9 October 2009; 2. "Mandaci una cartolina" Released: 15 January 2010; 3. "'A finestra" Released: 16 April 2010

Elettra (Italian for Electra) is the seventh studio album by Italian singer-songwriter Carmen Consoli, released in 2009.

== Production ==
The album was recorded in Catania in June 2009. It was mixed in Rome and mastered in Portland by Bob Ludwig.

== Release and artwork ==
The album was released on 30 October 2009. The cover art is a picture taken by fashion photographer Rankin, who also shot all the pictures in the album's booklet.

== Composition ==
The album has a more European and less ethnic sound than previous Consoli's works. The bossa nova "Non molto lontano da qui", "Mandaci una cartolina" (a portrait of Consoli's father, who had died in May 2009 following an aneurysm), and "'A finestra" served as album's singles. Several songs have strong themes, such as the title song "Elettra", which is a portrait of a prostitute who falls in love for a client, and "Mio zio", which tells of incestuous rape.

== Reception ==
The album debuted at the second place in the Italian album charts, and was certified gold after two weeks. It won the Targa Tenco for best album, the first album from a female artist to win that prize.

== Track listing ==
| No. | Title | Writer(s) | Length |
|---|---|---|---|
| 1. | "Mandaci una cartolina" | Carmen Consoli; Massimo Roccaforte | 3:22 |
| 2. | "Perturbazione atlantica" | Consoli | 3:34 |
| 3. | "Non molto lontano da qui" | Consoli | 3:46 |
| 4. | "Mio zio" | Consoli | 3:18 |
| 5. | "Sud Est" | Consoli | 3:30 |
| 6. | "Marie ti amiamo" (feat. Franco Battiato) | Consoli; Franco Battiato; Manlio Sgalambro | 3:38 |
| 7. | "'A finestra" | Consoli | 4:46 |
| 8. | "Col nome giusto" | Consoli | 3:41 |
| 9. | "Elettra" | Consoli | 4:24 |
| 10. | "Ventunodieciduemilatrenta" | Consoli | 4:02 |
| 11. | "Col nome giusto" (versione orchestrale) (iTunes bonus track) | Consoli | 3:39 |

== Charts ==
| Chart (2009) | Peak position |
|---|---|
| Italy (FIMI) | 2 |
