= Volevo fare la rockstar =

Studio album by Carmen Consoli
- Released: 24 September 2021
- Length: 44:10
- Label: Polydor; Universal Music; Narciso
- Producer: Carmen Consoli; Toni Carbone; Massimo Roccaforte

Carmen Consoli chronology
L'abitudine di tornare (2015)	Volevo fare la rockstar (2021)

Singles from Volevo fare la rockstar
- 1. "Una domenica al mare" Released: 3 September 2021; 2. "Qualcosa di me che non ti aspetti" Released: 29 October 2021; 3. "Sta succedendo" Released: 1 April 2022

Volevo fare la rockstar (lit. 'I wanted to be a rock star') is the ninth studio album by Italian singer-songwriter Carmen Consoli, released in 2021.

== Track listing ==
All lyrics are written by Carmen Consoli; all music is composed by Consoli, except where noted

Volevo fare la rockstar track listing
No.	Title	Length
1.	"Sta succedendo" (music: Consoli, Massimo Roccaforte)	3:28
2.	"L'aquilone"	4:05
3.	"Una domenica al mare"	4:32
4.	"Mago Magone" (featuring Doxy601; music: Consoli, Roccaforte)	3:52
5.	"Le cose di sempre"	3:54
6.	"Qualcosa di me che non ti aspetti"	4:00
7.	"Armonie numeriche"	4:46
8.	"Imparare dagli alberi a camminare"	4:38
9.	"L'uomo nero"	4:04
10.	"Volevo fare la rockstar" (music: Consoli, Roccaforte)	6:51

== Charts ==
Chart performance for Volevo fare la rockstar
Chart (2021)	Peak position
Italian Albums (FIMI)	2
Swiss Albums (Schweizer Hitparade)	93
