= Mediamente isterica =

Studio album by Carmen Consoli
- Released: 27 October 1998
- Genre: Rock
- Length: 46:08
- Label: Cyclope; Polydor
- Producer: Francesco Virlinzi

Carmen Consoli chronology
Confusa e felice (1997)	Mediamente isterica (1998)	Stato di necessità (2000)

Mediamente isterica (lit. 'Moderately hysterical') is the third studio album of Italian singer-songwriter Carmen Consoli, released in 1998. The album was named after a verse of the lead single, "Besame Giuda". The cover, featuring Consoli as a siren, was ideated by Alberto Bettinetti.

The album was recorded between May and August 1998 at the Cantinone Studio in Catania. A concept album, it features a series of female portraits, one for each song, and has deception as the main theme. The leading single "Besame Giuda" was released two weeks before the album, while the other singles were "Puramente casuale", the anti-war song "Eco di sirene" (whose music video was directed by Stefano Mordini), and "Autunno dolciastro" (only released as a promotional single). The song "Sentivo l'odore" was chosen as theme song of the Sky Cinema miniseries Donne assassine. The song "Ennesima eclisse" is inspired by Dante's Divine Comedy and features some backmasking, while "Contessa miseria" got its inspiration by Oscar Wilde's The Picture of Dorian Gray. It is considered the most 'rock' album by Consoli, with grudge and classic rock influences. It sold over 80,000 copies and was certificated gold.

In September 2008, it was released a Mediamente isterica Deluxe - Anniversary Edition consisting of two CDs, one containing the original album, and a second one with the same songs re-recorded by Consoli as well as outtakes and rarities.

== Track listing ==
No.	Title	Writer(s)	Length
1.	"Bésame Giuda"	Carmen Consoli	3:45
2.	"Bésame Mucho"	Consuelo Velázquez	0:33
3.	"Puramente casuale"	Consoli	3:35
4.	"Sentivo l'odore"	Consoli	4:40
5.	"Autunno dolciastro"	Consoli	5:33
6.	"Ennesima eclisse"	Consoli	4:03
7.	"In funzione di nessuna logica"	Consoli	3:07
8.	"Geisha"	Consoli	2:39
9.	"Eco di sirene"	Consoli	4:43
10.	"Quattordici luglio"	Consoli	5:04
11.	"Anello mancante"	Consoli	3:48
12.	"Contessa miseria"	Consoli	3:39
13.	"L'ultima preghiera"	Consoli; Massimo Roccaforte	4:17
14.	"L'uomo meschino" (only included in the 2008 version)	Consoli	4:06

== Charts ==
Chart (1998)	Peak position
Italy (FIMI)	4

Mediamente isterica Deluxe - Anniversary Edition

Chart (2008)	Peak position
Italy (FIMI)	22
