= L'abitudine di tornare =

Studio album by Carmen Consoli
- Released: 20 January 2015
- Recorded: 2015
- Genre: Pop rock; folk; electronica
- Length: 41:44
- Label: Universal Music Group
- Producer: Carmen Consoli

Carmen Consoli chronology
Elettra (2009)	L'abitudine di tornare (2015)	Volevo fare la rockstar (2021)

Singles from L'abitudine di tornare
- 1. "L'abitudine di tornare" Released: 28 November 2014; 2. "Sintonia imperfetta" Released: 6 March 2015; 3. "Ottobre" Released: 25 September 2015

Professional ratings
Review scores
Source	Rating
AllMusic	3.5/5 stars

L'abitudine di tornare ("The habit of returning") is the eighth studio album by Italian singer-songwriter Carmen Consoli. It was issued in 2015, five years after the greatest hits Per niente stanca and six years after her last studio album Elettra. The album is named after the single "L'abitudine di tornare", released in November 2014. The album peaked at third place on the Italian hit parade.

== Track listing ==
All lyrics are written by Carmen Consoli, except where noted; all music is composed by Consoli, except where noted

No.	Title	Length
1.	"L'abitudine di tornare"	3:32
2.	"Ottobre"	4:19
3.	"Esercito silente"	4:58
4.	"Sintonia imperfetta"	3:38
5.	"La signora del quinto piano" (music: Consoli, Gianluca Vaccaro)	4:57
6.	"Oceani deserti" (lyrics: Francesco Gazzè, Stefano Galafate Orlandi; music: Orlandi, Consoli, Max Gazzè)	3:49
7.	"E forse un giorno"	4:31
8.	"San Valentino"	3:38
9.	"La notte più lunga" (music: Consoli, Salvatore Distefano)	4:09
10.	"Questa piccola magia"	4:13

== Charts ==
Chart (2015)	Peak position
Italy (FIMI)	3

== Certifications ==
Region	Certification	Certified units/sales
Italy (FIMI)	Gold	25,000^{*}
^{*} Sales figures based on certification alone.
