= Stato di necessità =

Studio album by Carmen Consoli
- Released: 22 February 2000
- Length: 68:48
- Label: Cyclope; Polydor
- Producer: Francesco Virlinzi

Carmen Consoli chronology
Mediamente isterica (1998)	Stato di necessità (2000)	L'anfiteatro e la bambina impertinente (2001)

Stato di necessità (lit. 'State of necessity') is the fourth studio album of Italian singer-songwriter Carmen Consoli, released in 2000. The album followed the Consoli's participation in the Sanremo Music Festival 2000 with the song "In bianco e nero", and marked a significant change of style, with a softer and more acoustic sound. The title refers to Consoli's determination to embark on a new artistic phase of her career, and the song "Orfeo" is considered its manifesto. The album was recorded at the Waterbird Studio in Catania. It was the most successful album of Consoli, selling over 300,000 copies. A "Stato di necessità Tour" with over fifty dates followed the release of the album.

A French-language version of the album titled État de necessité was produced by Henri Salvador and released in 2002.

== Track listing ==
No.	Title	Writer(s)	Length
1.	"Bambina impertinente"	Carmen Consoli; Massimo Roccaforte	3:37
2.	"Stato di necessità"	Consoli	4:10
3.	"Parole di burro"	Consoli	4:04
4.	"Novembre '99 (L'isola del tesoro)"	Consoli	3:49
5.	"In bianco e nero"	Consoli	3:36
6.	"L'ultimo bacio"	Consoli	3:24
7.	"Il sultano (della Kianca)"	Consoli	4:02
8.	"Amado señor"	Consoli	3:33
9.	"L'epilogo"	Consoli	3:58
10.	"Orfeo"	Consoli	4:18
11.	"Equilibrio precario"	Consoli; Roccaforte	3:57
12.	"Non volermi male" (includes a ghost track)	Consoli	26:20

== Charts ==
Chart (2000)	Peak position
Italy (FIMI)	7

Chart (2020)	Peak position
Italy (FIMI)	27
