= Horror Vacui (album) =

Studio album by Linea 77
- Released: 8 February 2008
- Studio: Skip Saylor Studios, Los Angeles, CA
- Genre: Nu metal
- Length: 66:10
- Label: Universal Music Italia Srl
- Producer: Toby Wright

Linea 77 chronology
Venareal (2007)	Horror Vacui (2008)	10 (2010)

Singles from Horror Vacui
- 1. "Il mostro" Released: January 2008; 2. "Sogni risplendono" Released: February 2008; 3. "The Sharp Sound of Blades" Released: 2008; 4. "La nuova musica italiana" Released: November 24, 2008; 5. "Mi vida" Released: February 18, 2009

Professional ratings
Review scores
Source	Rating
Rockline	5/10 stars

Horror Vacui is the sixth studio album from the Italian nu metal band Linea 77. It was released on February 8, 2008.

It is the first work produced by Universal and in which Linea 77 collaborated with the producer Toby Wright. The title of the album is linked to cenophobia and the theme of the emptiness of life.

== Track listing ==
1. "The Sharp Sound of Blades" – 3:48
2. "Sempre meglio" – 3:16
3. "Grotesque" – 3:03
4. "Il mostro" – 4:24
5. "Sogni risplendono" (feat. Tiziano Ferro) – 3:38
6. "My Magic Skeleton" – 3:43
7. "Penelope" – 3:57
8. "Mi vida" – 3:49
9. "Overload" – 4:10
10. "La nuova musica italiana" – 4:54
11. "Touch 2.0" – 2:48
12. "Kings" (iTunes Bonus Track) – 3:54
13. "Pete" (DeeJay Store Bonus Track) – 3:46

== Charts ==
Chart performance for Horror Vacui
Chart (2008)	Peak position
Italian Albums (FIMI)	21
