= Denovo (band) =

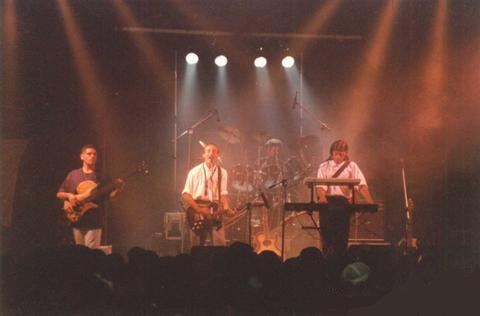
- Denovo in concert (1988)

Background information
- Origin: Catania, Italy
- Genres: New wave, pop rock

Denovo (also referred to as I Denovo) is an Italian new wave group formed in 1981 in Catania.

== Background ==
The band formed in Catania in 1981. In 1982, they placed second at the National Rock Festival held in Bologna, behind Litfiba. They made their official recording debut with the EP Niente insetti su Wilma, released in 1984, which had some local success and received several appreciations from the critics. The group had its breakout in 1987, with the album Persuasione, referred to as "one of the best products of the Italian indie scene of the 1980s". After several hits and two more albums, the group disbanded in the 1990s, with Mario Venuti and Luca Madonia pursuing solo careers and Toni Carbone focusing on production. Following several occasional reunions, notably a special appearance at the 2008 Sanremo Music Festival, the group officially reunited in 2014 for the album Kamikaze Bohemien.

Bass guitarist Toni Carbone died on 11 July 2023, at the age of 62.

== Personnel ==
- Mario Venuti - vocals, guitars, keyboards, horns (1982–1990)
- Luca Madonia - vocals, guitars, keyboards (1982–1990)
- Toni Carbone - bass (1982–1990; died 2023)
- Gabriele Madonia - drums (1982–1987, 1989–1990)
- Raffaele Fazio - drums (1988)

== Discography ==
Albums

- 1984 - Niente insetti su Wilma (EP)
- 1985 - Unicanisai
- 1987 - Persuasione
- 1988 - Così fan tutti
- 1989 - Venuti dalle Madonie a cercar carbone
- 2014 - Kamikaze Bohemien
