= Confusa e felice =

Studio album by Carmen Consoli
- Released: 19 April 1997
- Length: 40:24
- Label: Cyclope; Polydor
- Producer: Francesco Virlinzi

Carmen Consoli chronology
Due parole (1996)	Confusa e felice (1997)	Mediamente isterica (1998)

Confusa e felice is the second album by Italian singer-songwriter Carmen Consoli, issued in 1997. The album was named after the leading single "Confusa e felice" ("Confused and happy"), presented at Sanremo Music Festival 1997 and eliminated from the competition after the first night. The other singles were "Venere" (a metaphorical portrait of a crippled Venus which was a radio hit) and "Uguale a ieri".

While mostly introspective, Confusa e felice was the first Consoli's album to deal with general themes, such as AIDS (in "Per niente stanca", originally titled "Sangue infetto") and Holocaust and racism (in "Un sorso in più"). The song "Blunotte" was originally intended to be performed by Tosca and its title is an homage to Joni Mitchell's album Blue. The album was certificated platinum and sold over 120,000 copies.

== Track listing ==
All tracks are written by Carmen Consoli.

No.	Title	Length
1.	"Bonsai #1"	1:02
2.	"Uguale a ieri"	3:59
3.	"Diversi"	3:53
4.	"Confusa e felice"	3:38
5.	"Fidarmi delle tue carezze"	3:33
6.	"Un sorso in più"	3:54
7.	"Venere"	3:51
8.	"Per niente stanca"	4:25
9.	"Fino all'ultimo"	5:03
10.	"Blunotte"	4:03
11.	"La bellezza delle cose"	4:03
12.	"Bonsai #2"	1:01

== Charts ==
Chart (1997)	Peak position
Italy (FIMI)	6

Chart (2022)	Peak position
Italy (FIMI)	19
