= Eva contro Eva =

Studio album by Carmen Consoli
- Released: May 12, 2006
- Length: 43:17
- Label: Universal Music Group
- Producer: Francesco Barbaro

Carmen Consoli chronology
L'eccezione (2002)	Eva contro Eva (2006)	Elettra (2009)

Professional ratings
Review scores
Source	Rating
AllMusic	3.5/5 stars

Eva contro Eva (Italian for Eva against Eva) is the sixth studio album by Italian singer-songwriter Carmen Consoli, released in 2006.

== Release and artwork ==
The album was released in Italy on 12 May 2006. The cover art is a picture by Elliott Landy, who had known Consoli during a visit of hers at Natalie Merchant's house.

The album was also published in the United States in 2007.

== Composition ==
The two singles of the album were "Signor Tentenna" and "Tutto su Eva". The album also contains collaborations with Goran Bregovic and Angelique Kidjo, respectively in "Il pendio dell'abbandono" (originally recorded for the Roberto Faenza's film The Days of Abandonment, where it served as closing credits song) and "Madre Terra". "La dolce attesa" samples the Rosa Balistreri-Otello Profazio folk song "Ninna nanna di la guerra".

== Reception ==
The album debuted at the first place in the Italian album charts, selling about 80,000 copies and gaining platinum status. It has been described as "maybe [Consoli's] best work", with "warm arrangements of strings and woodwinds" and Consoli abandoning electric guitars and "returning to the sounds of Sicilian tradition".

== Track listing ==
All lyrics are written by Carmen Consoli, except where noted; all music is composed by Consoli, except where noted.

No.	Title	Length
1.	"Tutto su Eva"	6:12
2.	"Maria Catena"	4:17
3.	"La dolce attesa" (music: Santi Pulvirenti)	4:21
4.	"Sulle rive di Morfeo"	4:38
5.	"Il pendio dell'abbandono" (music: Goran Bregovic)	3:21
6.	"Preghiera in gola"	3:57
7.	"Piccolo Cesare"	4:49
8.	"Madre Terra" (featuring: Angélique Kidjo; lyrics and music: Consoli, Kidjo)	3:57
9.	"Signor Tentenna"	4:36
10.	"Il sorriso di Atlantide"	4:09

== Charts ==
Chart (2002)	Peak position
Italy (FIMI)	1
Swiss Albums (Schweizer Hitparade)	85
