= Available for Propaganda =

Studio album by Linea 77
- Released: 15 November 2005
- Recorded: Paramount Studios, Los Angeles
- Genre: Nu metal
- Length: 44:36
- Label: Earache Records
- Producer: Dave Dominguez; Linea 77

Linea 77 chronology
Numb (2003)	Available for Propaganda (2005)	Venareal (2007)

Singles from Available for Propaganda
- 1. "Evoluzione" Released: 2005; 2. "Inno all'odio" Released: 2006

Available for Propaganda is the fourth studio album from the Italian nu metal band Linea 77. It was released on 15 November 2005 by Earache Records. The third track "Inno all'odio" featured in FIFA 06.

== Track listing ==
1. "Fist" - 3:06
2. "But I Thought Everything Was Alright" - 3:18
3. "Inno all'odio" (Anthem to Hatred) - 4:21
4. "Charon" - 3:12
5. "Sleepless" - 3:47
6. "Evoluzione" (Evolution) - 3:21
7. "Lost in a Videogame" - 4:45
8. "Rotten Mouth & Broken Arm" - 4:03
9. "Squeal" - 3:54
10. "A.D.H.D." - 3:04
11. "Therapia" (Therapy) - 3:37
12. "To Protect and Serve" - 4:08

== Charts ==
Chart performance for Available for Propaganda
Chart (2005)	Peak position
Italian Albums (FIMI)	9
