= Controllo del livello di rombo =

Live album by Subsonica
- Released: 2003
- Genre: Alternative rock, electronic rock

Subsonica chronology
Amorematico (2002)	Controllo del livello di rombo (2003)	Terrestre (2005)

Controllo del livello di rombo is a double live album by Italian rock band Subsonica. It also contains three studio tracks: "L'Errore", "Livido Amniotico" and "Non Chiedermi Niente".

== Track listing ==
=== Disc one ===
1. L'Errore
2. Radiopatchanka
3. Nuvole Rapide
4. Albascura
5. Colpo Di Pistola
6. Gente Tranquilla (featuring Rachid)
7. Perfezione
8. Velociraptor
9. Come Se
10. Il Cielo Su Torino
11. Tutti I Miei Sbagli
12. Livido Amniotico (featuring Veronika Coassolo)

=== Disc two ===
1. Non Chiedermi Niente
2. Eva-Eva
3. Discolabirinto
4. Nuova Ossessione
5. Mammifero
6. Depre
7. Strade
8. Ain't No Sunshine
9. Istantanee
10. Aurora Sogna
11. Liberi Tutti
12. Sole Silenzioso
