= Patrizia Laquidara =

Italian singer (born 1972)

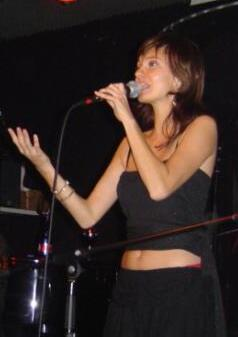

Background information
- Born: October 29, 1972 (age 53); Catania, Italy
- Occupations: Singer; songwriter
- Years active: 1998–present
- Website: patrizialaquidara.it

Patrizia Laquidara (born October 29, 1972) is an Italian singer and writer.

== Biography ==
Patrizia Laquidara was born in Catania, on the island of Sicily. When she was very young her family moved to a small town in the province of Vicenza, Veneto, where she began studying music and playing in piano bars during weekends.

In 1998 she attended a course at CET music school, as composer and singer of popular music of Lombardy and Veneto. This school is run by the well-known Mogol, who wrote the texts of Lucio Battisti songs. She is also interested in the music of many Mediterranean countries and in the music of central Europe and the Balkan region. She often tours Italy with her group, the Hotel Rif.

In 1999 one of her songs, "Stella nascente", was included on an album titled Canzoni per Ornella Vanoni e Mario Lavezzi, but her true love at the time was for Brazilian music. Her first solo album, in 2001, was titled Para você querido Caé (For you, dear Caetano) and was dedicated to the Brazilian singer Caetano Veloso.

Just after this album, her song "Agisce", written with the collaboration of Bungaro, won the Città di Recanati prize for best music and interpretation.

In 2003, she participated in the Sanremo Music Festival with the song "Lividi e fiori" and won the Mia Martini Critics Prize and the Alex Baroni prize for best interpretation. The same year she released her second album, titled Indirizzo portoghese, and sang its songs during the tour Indirizzo portoghese live.

At the same time, she developed many other projects, collaborating with the pianist Debora Petrina or composing songs for the soundtrack of the 2005 movie Manuale d'amore, directed by Giovanni Veronesi. The song "Noite e luar", in Portuguese, became well known in Italy.

In 2006, she participated in the international festival of ethnic and contemporary music named "Suoni dell'altro mondo" (Sounds from another world) and also in the Premio Tenco.

In 2007, she released her third album, Funambola, produced by Arto Lindsay and Patrick Dillett. The album was dedicated to the tightrope walker Philippe Petit, who walked on a steel wire between the towers of the World Trade Center in New York City. She also received the Gold Mask Prize for Popular Music Singer from the Bologna Conservatory.

In 2008, she toured all around Italy with Funambola and sang in a musical theatre piece by Massimo Carlotto.

She also performed with the pianist Alfonso Santimone, looking for electronic sonorities as well as rediscovering old Japanese songs, in this way showing all the eclecticism of her art.

She also sang in the show Creuza de luna, a poetical and musical journey starting in Italy and traveling to South America, Spain and Portugal.

She participated in Etnafest in Catania, sang during the Festivalguer of Alghero and at the Cagliari Expo.

Late in December, Patrizia presented a video from her song "Ziza", on a TV show on Rai Due.

During 2009 she participated on the show Musica dei cieli (Music of the skies) and was part of a traditional Italian Christmas songs concert in the big Rome Auditorium.

She also performed the song "Su li stiddi" at the New Sicilian Song Festival then went to Lisbon for the Festa do Cinema Italiano, a film festival, where her song "Personaggio" was the cover. She sang in three concerts, the most important being at the Cabaret Maxime.

She then flew to Morocco, in Casablanca, with the show Popular Music of the Mediterranean.

After coming back to Italy, she received the Giovanni Paisiello prize, a part of the Magna Grecia Awards, with the following motivation: "The musical event, the balance between the high pitches and the shades in the pronunciation of words, make her voice a unique melody, Patrizia Laquidara emphasizes old sonorities and enters the scene, barefoot, to leave her untold impressions in the intimate sactum of every heart, that opens with her to new rhythms".

Her song "Assenza" was then included in the album Capo Verde terra d'amore vol. I, a compilation of songs of Cape Verde musicians, sung by them and Italian singers. The proceeds of this album are given to the United Nations food program for children.

She participated in a show on the national television channel Rai Due, then flew to the United States for a July tour, with concerts in Seattle, San Francisco, Los Angeles and New York, along with the Brazilian singer Céu.

In October, she sang in the Milan jazz club Blue Note and announced a new record. She sang during the New Year's Eve concert in Piazza dei Signori, Vicenza.

== Discography ==
=== Albums ===
- Para você querido Caé (Audio Records/Velut Luna – 2001)
- Indirizzo portoghese (Genius Records/Virgin Music – 2003)
- Funambola (Ponderosa Music&Art – 2007)
- Il Canto dell'Anguana (Indie Europe/Zoom – 2011)

=== Singles ===
- Agisce (2003)
- Lividi e fiori (2003)
- Per causa d'amore
- Indirizzo Portoghese
- Parlami d'amore, Mariù
- Le cose (2007)
- Personaggio (2008)
- Ziza (2008)

=== Compilations ===
- Stella nascente, in the album "Canzoni per Ornella Vanoni e Mario Lavezzi" (1999)
- Assenza, in the album "Capo Verde terra d'amore vol. I" (2009)

== Filmography ==
- Manuale d'amore, directed by Giovanni Veronesi (2005)
