= Parole di burro =

Single by Carmen Consoli

from the album Stato di necessità
- Released: 2000
- Genre: Pop; bossa nova
- Label: Universal
- Songwriter: Carmen Consoli

Carmen Consoli singles chronology
"In bianco e nero" (2000)	"Parole di burro" (2000)	"Orfeo" (2000)

Music video
- "Parole di burro" on YouTube

"Parole di burro" (lit. 'Words made of butter'), also known as "Narciso", is a 2000 song composed and performed by Carmen Consoli.

The original title "Narciso" (Narcissus) was changed as in the album there was already a song with a mythologycal figure in its title, "Orfeo" (Orpheus). It was the first song that Consoli composed for the album Stato di necessità, and it was her initial choice for the Sanremo Music Festival 2000, being eventually replaced by "In bianco e nero".

The song has been described as an 'enchanting vintage bossa nova', with Burt Bacharach and Brazilian music influences. The music video of the song was directed by Francesco Fei and was shot in Morocco. One of Consoli's major hits, it was nominated for best song at the 2000 Italian Music Award, and won the award for best music video.

== Charts ==
Chart	Peak position
Italy (FIMI)	4
Italy Airplay (Nielsen Music Control)	1
