= Linea 77 =

Italian metal band

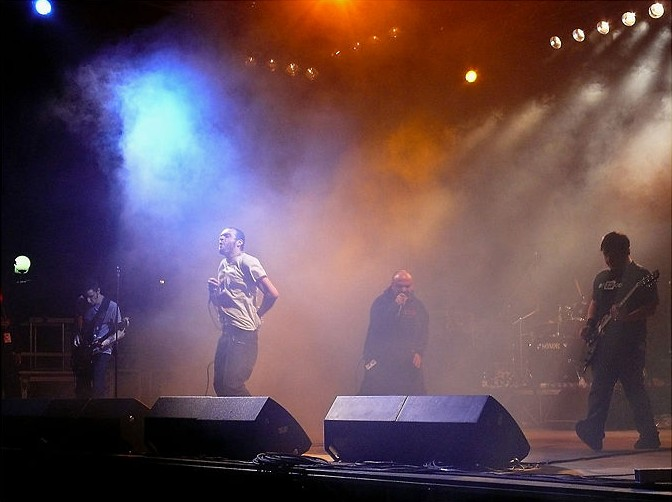
- Linea 77 performing in 2008

Background information
- Origin: Turin, Italy
- Genres: Nu metal; alternative metal; funk metal
- Years active: 1993–present
- Labels: Earache Records (2000–2007); Universal Records (2008–2011)
- Website: Linea77.com

Linea 77 is an Italian nu metal band formed in 1993.

"Inno all'odio," a song from their fifth studio album, Available for Propaganda was featured on the soundtrack of FIFA 06. They were formerly signed to Universal Records. In 2008, Linea 77 released a single entitled "Sogni risplendono" featuring vocals from Italian singer-songwriter Tiziano Ferro.

== Band members ==
- Nitto (Nicola Sangermano) - vocals
- Chinaski (Paolo Pavanello) - guitar
- Dade (Davide Pavanello) - bass (1993–2012), vocals (2012)
- Tozzo (Christian Montanarella) - drums, percussion
- Maggio (Fabio Zompa) - bass (2012)
- Paolo (Paolo Paganelli) - guitar (2012)

=== Former members ===
- Sibba - vocals (1993–1996)
- Colino - guitar (1993–1996)
- Emi (Emiliano Audisio) - vocals (1993–2012)

== Discography ==
=== Albums ===
- 1998 – Too Much Happiness Makes Kids Paranoid
- 2001 – Ket.ch.up Sui.ci.de
- 2003 – Numb
- 2005 – Available for Propaganda
- 2007 – Venareal
- 2008 – Horror Vacui
- 2010 – 10
- 2011 – Live 2010 (Live)
- 2013 – La speranza è una trappola (EP)*
- 2015 – Oh!

=== Demo ===
- 1995 – Ogni cosa al suo posto
- 1997 – Kung fu
- 1998 – The Spaghetti Incident?

=== Singles and music videos ===
- 1998 – Meat
- 2000 – Ket.ch.up Sui.ci.de
- 2001 – Potato Music Machine
- 2001 – Moka
- 2003 – Fantasma
- 2003 – Third Moon
- 2004 – 66 (diabolus in musica) (feat. Subsonica)
- 2005 – Evoluzione
- 2006 – Inno All'Odio
- 2008 – Il Mostro
- 2008 – Sogni Risplendono (feat. Tiziano Ferro)
- 2008 – The Sharp Sound of Blades
- 2008 – La Nuova Musica Italiana
- 2009 – Mi Vida
- 2010 – Vertigine
- 2010 – Aspettando Meteoriti
- 2010 – L'ultima Volta
- 2012 – Il Veleno
- 2012 – La musica è finita
- 2013 – La Caduta (feat. LNRipley)
- 2013 – L'involuzione della specie
- 2014 – Io sapere poco leggere
- 2015 – Absente Reo
- 2015 – Divide et Impera (feat. Enigma)

== Videography ==
- Numbed (2004)
