= Confusa e felice (song) =

Single by Carmen Consoli

from the album Confusa e felice
- Released: 1997
- Genre: Rock
- Label: Polydor Records
- Songwriter: Carmen Consoli

Carmen Consoli singles chronology
"Lingua a sonagli" (1996)	"Confusa e felice" (1997)	"Venere" (1997)

Audio
- "Confusa e felice" on YouTube

"Confusa e felice" (lit. 'Confused and happy') is a 1997 song composed and performed by Carmen Consoli.

== Background ==
The song was Consoli's entry in Sanremo Music Festival 1997; the initial choice for the festival was "Diversi", but eventually Consoli preferred to enter the competition with a less traditional and more courageous song. The song was eliminated from the competition after the first night. In the following weeks, it became a surprise hit, also thanks to its being chosen as the soundtrack for a commercial for the Rocco Barocco's Piazza di Spagna perfume.

The style of the song has been paired to Irish rock, goth rock and to Janis Joplin's existentialist ballads. It has been described as a song where 'rock lunges and oblique melodies alternate, supported by a voice that is sometimes confidential and sometimes high-pitched'.

In 2012, Francesca Michielin covered the song in her EP Distratto.

== Track listing ==
No.	Title	Length
1.	"Confusa e felice"	3:36
2.	"Quello che sento (Vernetti Remix)"	4:27

== Charts ==
Chart	Peak position
Italy (FIMI)	3
