= Susanna Parigi =

Italian singer-songwriter and pianist (1961–2023)

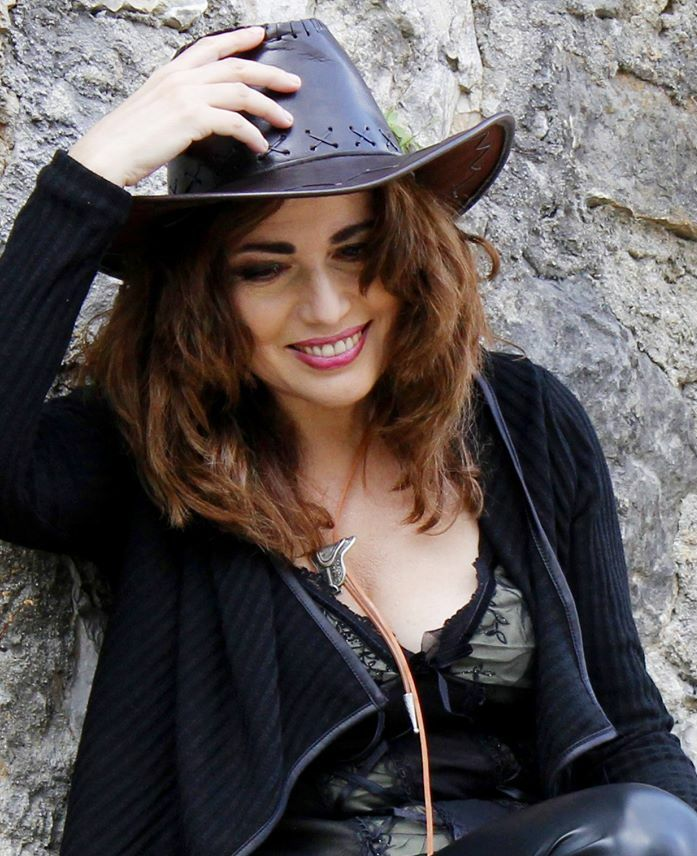

Background information
- Born: 13 May 1961; Florence, Italy
- Died: 18 December 2023 (aged 62); Milan, Italy
- Genres: Pop
- Occupation(s): Singer, songwriter, pianist, author
- Years active: 1987–2023
- Website: susannaparigi.it

Susanna Parigi (13 May 1961 – 18 December 2023) was an Italian singer, songwriter, pianist and author.

== Musical career ==
After earning her diploma in piano at the Cherubini Conservatory in Florence, Parigi studied modern singing in Rome, opera in Bologna, and jazz in Milan.

Parigi's early songs were discovered by Vincenzo Micocci, who signed her to the IT label. Her debut single, "Un anello di fumo" (A smoke ring) earned her first prize as a singer on La fabbrica dei sogni (The dream factory) TV show on RAI 3.

Parigi toured as a pianist with Greg Brown and Riccardo Cocciante, as a vocalist and accordion player with Claudio Baglioni, and with Raf for his album Cannibali.

Her first album, Susanna Parigi, was released in 1995. With this album, the author began a personal path devoting herself to songwriting. Since her second album, Scomposta (1999), Parigi collaborated with Kaballà, a songwriter who shared her views.

Her third album, In differenze, includes a collaboration with Pat Metheny. Tony Levin, the Sofia Symphonic Orchestra, well-known Italian musicians, and philosopher Umberto Galimberti also appear on or contributed to the album, whose cover was photographed by Sebastião Salgado. It was performed in live shows in Milan, Florence, Bologna, and at the Colosseo. In December 2006 the show was released on DVD with the cooperation of Doctors Without Borders.

In 2000 her song "Tre passi indietro" received first prize and a special award for Best Composition at the International Festival of Songwriting in Switzerland.

In 2003, Parigi was a finalist at the Festival della Canzone d'Autore in Recanati.

In 2009, she released L'insulto delle parole (The insult of words). A videoclip contains interviews with Italian writers and artists; the main theme is the way language is often mishandled by mass media: new words for old facts, old words for new facts are, according to the author, an insult to people.

Parigi also taught at the Bonporti Conservatory of Trento.

== Death ==
She died at 62 in 17 December 2023 from a long illness.

== Discography ==
=== Albums ===
- 1995: Susanna Parigi (RTI Music)
- 1999: Scomposta (Carisch)
- 2004: In differenze (Sette Ottavi)
- 2009: L'insulto delle parole (Promo Music)
- 2011: La Lingua Segreta Delle Donne
- 2014: Il Saltimbanco E La Luna
- 2014: Apnea

=== Single ===
- 1987: Un anello di fumo (IT EN 423)

=== Unpublished ===
- 2001: Terra rossa (song with which she won the International Award "Myrta Gabardi")
- 2002: Dal cielo invisibile scende in forma di suono la pena d'acqua (a song edited on New Age magazine N.115 May 2002)
- 2006: La canzone dei vecchi amanti (with Kaballà, only available on DVD In differenze, a different version from the album L'insulto delle parole)
- 2006: Qualcosa che ci sfugge (only available on DVD In differenze)
- 2008: Silent Night (released on the album Dear Father Christmas, whose profits were used to give computer terminals to long-term care pediatric wards)

=== Poetry ===
- 2010: A poem of Susanna Parigi was published in the book Calpestare l'oblio. Poeti italiani contro la minaccia incostituzionale, per la resistenza della memoria repubblicana, Edizioni Marte, January 2010
