= Io sono Francesco =

2000 single by Tricarico

Single by Tricarico

from the album Tricarico
- Released: 2000
- Length: 4:11
- Label: Universal
- Songwriter: Tricarico

Tricarico singles chronology
| "Io sono Francesco" (2000) | "Drago" (2001) |

Audio
- "Io sono Francesco" on YouTube

"Io sono Francesco" ('I am Francesco') is a 2000 Italian song by Tricarico. It is his debut single and his signature song.

== Background ==
Tricarico's autobiographical lyrics are based on an episode from his childhood, when a teacher made him write a composition about his father, whom Tricarico had lost at the age of three.

With this song Tricarico participated in the Festivalbar and was opening act in a series of Jovanotti's concerts.

== Reception ==
The single stayed seven months on the Italian hit parade, being certified platinum. The song has been described as 'a decidedly non-light theme, approached with lyrics that are simple but not trivial, set to a catchy, immediate and apparently lighthearted melody'. Roberto De Angelis from Radio 105 noted: 'When you first hear it, it sounds like a nursery rhyme for kids with problems, but the tune and the lyrics soon get to you'.

Italian writer Vincenzo Rossini referred to "Io sono Francesco" as 'a surreal electronic little song, excessively cheerful, excessively sing-song, sung in an excessively crooked way — almost off-key, some would say — and in any case excessively "strange"', whose lyrics 'evoke a whole imaginary of childhood abuse: shock, humiliation, sense of inadequacy, anger, revenge, isolation'.

== Track listing ==
| No. | Title | Writer(s) | Length |
|---|---|---|---|
| 1. | "Io sono Francesco" | Tricarico | 4:09 |
| 2. | "Brillantini" | Tricarico | 3:19 |
| 3. | "Io sono Francesco (base)" | Tricarico | 4:07 |

== Charts ==
| Chart (2000–2001) | Peak position |
|---|---|
| Italy (FIMI) | 1 |
