= L'ultimo bacio (song) =

Single by Carmen Consoli

from the album Stato di necessità
- Released: 2000
- Genre: Ballad
- Length: 3:24
- Label: Polydor
- Songwriter: Carmen Consoli

Carmen Consoli singles chronology
"Orfeo" (2000)	"L'ultimo bacio" (2000)	"L'eccezione" (2002)

Audio
- "L'ultimo bacio" on YouTube

"L'ultimo bacio" (Italian pronunciation: [ˈlultimo ˈbaːtʃo]; transl. The Last Kiss) is a 2000 song composed and performed by Carmen Consoli.

One of Consoli's better known songs, its lyrics inspired the Gabriele Muccino's film with the same title (internationally known as The Last Kiss). The song was eventually included in the film's soundtrack, and Consoli made a brief cameo in the final scene of the film. Muccino also directed the music video of the song.

== Reception ==
The song, which includes several explicit as well as hidden references to Domenico Modugno's "Piove", has been described as "vibrant, heartbreaking, sophisticated" and as a song which made "even the most sceptical ones [...] capitulate, having to admit that [Consoli's] peculiar way of using erudite expressions, seeking difficulty instead of linearity, rippling the surface of the verses to chase an alliteration or an assonance at all costs could, under balanced conditions, become a kind of poetry that is unique on the Italian scene". It won the Nastro d'Argento for best original song.

== Track listing ==
No.	Title	Length
1.	"L'ultimo bacio"	3:24

== Certifications ==
Region	Certification	Certified units/sales
Italy (FIMI) certification for digital sales and streaming since January 2009	Gold	25,000^{‡}
^{‡} Sales+streaming figures based on certification alone.
