= L'eccezione (album) =

Studio album by Carmen Consoli
- Released: 2002
- Length: 44:43
- Label: Polydor

Carmen Consoli chronology
| L'anfiteatro e la bambina impertinente (2001) | L'eccezione (2002) | Eva contro Eva (2006) |

L'eccezione (lit. 'The exception') is the fifth studio album by Italian singer-songwriter Carmen Consoli, released in 2002.

== Production ==
The album had initially as working title La mia rivoluzione ('My Revolution'), a title which was scrapped when the same year singer-songwriter Marco Parente released a single with the same name. It was recorded in Sant'Alfio between February and June 2002 and mixed at Sterling Sound in New York.

== Release and artwork ==
The album was released on 25 October 2002. The cover art is a picture taken by fashion photographer Rankin. Two days before its release, the album was anticipated by a "Carmen Consoli Day" on MTV Italia, i.e. a 24-hours program schedule dedicated to her, including a live concert where Consoli premiered several songs of the album.

In 2003, a European version of the album entitled Carmen Consoli was released, containing two unreleased tracks and some English-language song versions, plus a rock cover version of Kylie Minogue's "Can't Get It Out of My Head".

== Composition ==
Following its title track as lead single, other singles were "Pioggia d'aprile" (a portrait of the Aci Trezza waterfront in the spring) and "Fiori d'arancio". The album include the first instrumental song by Consoli, "Carmen". It also include as hidden track an English-language version of "Matilde odiava i gatti" with a vocal contribution of Max Gazzè.

== Reception ==
The album debuted at the first place in the Italian album charts, beating the Mina's album Veleno which had been released the same week. It has been described as "a proof of maturity", where "melodies seem more polished and effective than ever before" and "horizons expand, [...] between South American influences and electronic accents".

== Track listing ==
| No. | Title | Writer(s) | Length |
|---|---|---|---|
| 1. | "Pioggia d'aprile" | Carmen Consoli | 3:22 |
| 2. | "L'eccezione" | Consoli | 3:11 |
| 3. | "Mulini a vento" | Consoli | 3:43 |
| 4. | "Fiori d'arancio" | Consoli | 3:33 |
| 5. | "Matilde odiava i gatti" | Consoli | 3:20 |
| 6. | "Uva acerba" | Consoli | 3:38 |
| 7. | "Moderato in Re minore" | Consoli | 4:20 |
| 8. | "Masino" | Consoli | 1:32 |
| 9. | "L'alleanza" | Consoli; Massimo Roccaforte | 3:13 |
| 10. | "Venti del Nord" | Consoli; Salvo Di Stefano | 3:44 |
| 11. | "Eppur si muove" | Consoli | 3:20 |
| 12. | "Carmen" | Consoli | 3:03 |

== Charts ==
| Chart (2002) | Peak position |
|---|---|
| Italy (FIMI) | 1 |
