= Amorematico =

Studio album by Subsonica
- Released: 2002
- Genre: Alternative rock, electronic rock

Subsonica chronology
Microchip Emozionale (1999)	Amorematico (2002)	Controllo del livello di rombo (2003)

Amorematico is an album released by the Italian rock band Subsonica in 2002. The title is an amalgamation of the terms love, automatic, and ematic.

== Track listing ==
1. "Nuvole Rapide"
2. "Albascura"
3. "Dentro i miei vuoti"
4. "Eva-Eva"
5. "Nuova Ossessione"
6. "Mammifero"
7. "Sole Silenzioso"
8. "Ieri"
9. "Gente Tranquilla"
10. "Questo domani"
11. "Atmosferico I"
12. "Atmosferico II"
13. "Atmosferico III"
14. "Atmosferico IV"
