= L'eccezione (Carmen Consoli song) =

Single by Carmen Consoli

from the album L'eccezione
- Released: 2002
- Label: Universal
- Composer: Carmen Consoli
- Lyricist: Carmen Consoli
- Producers: Carmen Consoli; Francesco Barbaro; Massimo Roccaforte; Maurizio Nicotra

Carmen Consoli singles chronology
| "Gamine impertinente" (2000) | "L'eccezione" (2002) | "Pioggia d'aprile" (2003) |

Music video
- "L'eccezione" on YouTube

"L'eccezione" (lit. 'The exception') is a 2002 song by Italian singer-songwriter Carmen Consoli and the title track and lead single of the album with the same name. The song deals with one of Consoli's favorite themes, i.e. social conformity and homologation. The music video of the song was shot at the Acquario Romano in Rome and directed by Maria Sole Tognazzi.

The song peaked at number 4 of the FIMI singles chart.

== Personnel ==
Credits adapted from Tidal.

- Carmen Consoli – producer, author, associated performer, recording arranger, vocals
- Francesco Barbaro – producer
- Massimo Roccaforte – producer, associated performer, recording arranger
- Maurizio Nicotra – producer, associated performer, recording arranger
- Leandro Misuriello – associated performer, recording arranger
- Puccio Panettieri – associated performer, recording arranger
- Santi Pulvirenti – associated performer, recording arranger

== Track listing ==
| No. | Title | Producer(s) | Length |
|---|---|---|---|
| 1. | "L'eccezione (Live MTV/Supersonic)" | Francesco Barbaro, Massimo Roccaforte, Maurizio Nicotra | 3:13 |
| 2. | "Moderato in re minore (Rough Mix Version)" | Barbaro, Nicotra, Salvo Di Stefano | 4:27 |
| 3. | "Lingua a sonagli (Live)" | Allan Goldberg, Francesco Virlinzi | 3:29 |

== Charts ==
| Chart (2002) | Peak position |
|---|---|
| Italy (FIMI) | 4 |
| Italy Airplay (Nielsen Music Control) | 13 |
