= Carmen Consoli =

Italian singer-songwriter

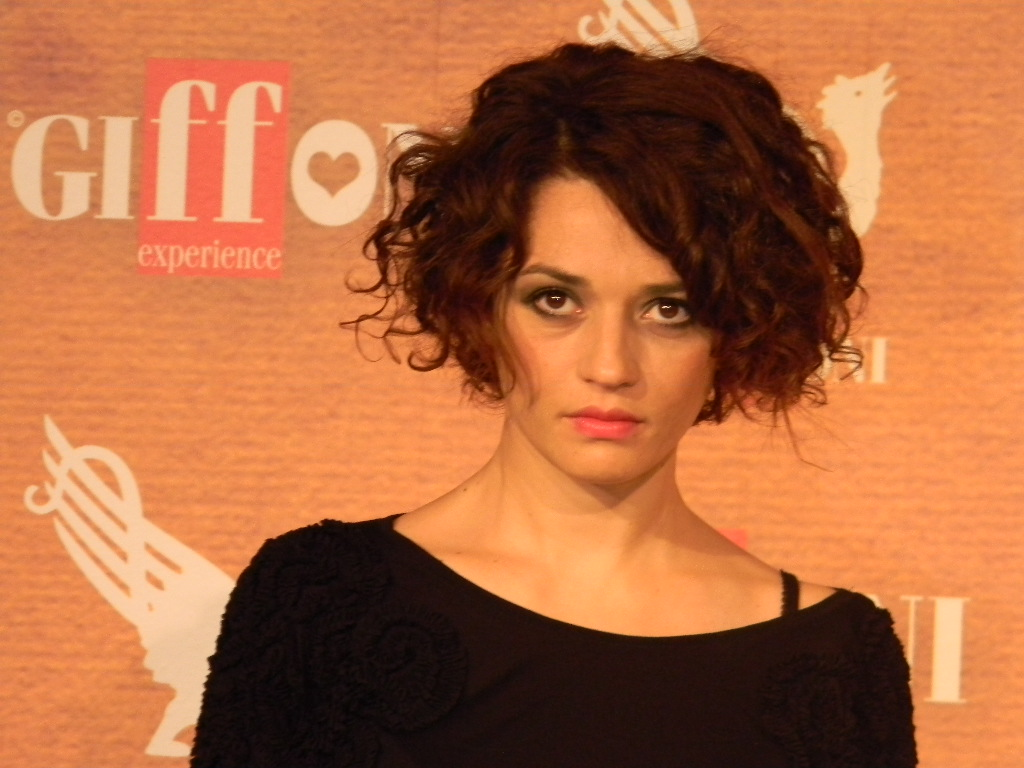
- Consoli at the 2010 Giffoni Film Festival

Background information
- Born: Carmen Carla Consoli; 4 September 1974 (age 52); Catania, Italy
- Origin: San Giovanni la Punta, Italy
- Genres: Pop; rock; alt-pop; folk
- Occupations: Singer; songwriter; guitarist
- Years active: 1995–present
- Labels: PolyGram (1995—1999); Universal (2000—present)
- Website: www.carmenconsoli.it

Carmen Carla Consoli OMRI (Italian pronunciation: [ˈkarmeŋ ˈkɔnsoli]; born 4 September 1974) is an Italian singer-songwriter. Described as 'a remarkable combination of rocker and intellectual', she has released 11 studio albums, one greatest hits, one soundtrack album, two live albums, four video album and 33 singles, selling 2 million copies in Italy, certified by M&D and FIMI with a multiplatinum disc, 11 platinum and two gold certifications.

She entered the Sanremo Music Festival three times, and during her career won a Premio Tenco, a Targa Tenco, a Lunezia Award, seven Italian, Wind & Music Awards, a Telegatto, a David di Donatello, and two Nastri d'Argento, as well as several other awards. In 2012 Consoli has been appointed as a Knight of the Order of Merit of the Italian Republic.

== Life and career ==
=== Early life ===
Carmen Consoli was born in Catania, Sicily, to a Sicilian father, Giuseppe Consoli, and a Venetian mother, Maria Rosa Toffolo, and grew up in the small town of San Giovanni la Punta. She started playing guitar at the age of nine and at fourteen she started performing with a rock-blues band, the Moon Dog's Party.

=== 1990s ===
Consoli served as backing vocalist in the 1991 Caftua album One Day and in the 1994 Lula album Da dentro. In 1995, during a trip in Rome, she made her first television appearance, performing the song "L'isola del tesoro" (later released as "Novembre '99" in the album Stato di necessità) in the Rai 3 Michele Santoro's talk show Tempo reale. Returning to Catania, she was chosen by producer Francesco Virlinzi as the vocalist of a rock group which never materialized and whose name was an homage to Big Brother and the Holding Company, "Big Brothers (and the Katanise Company)"; while the project was eventually scrapped, the other two members of the band Massimo Roccaforte and Salvo Distefano became longtime collaborators of Consoli. The same year she was among the winners of Sanremo Giovani, a televised competition aimed at selecting the contestants of the Sanremo Music Festival newcomers section, with her first single "Quello che sento". In 1996, she entered the 46th Sanremo Festival with the song "Amore di plastica", and released her debut album, Due Parole.

Her next album, Confusa e felice (1997) was a critical and commercial success, selling over 130,000 copies. The same year, she got awarded the Premio italiano della musica award as revelation of the year and she embarked on her first tour. In September 2007 she was for a week the host of the program So 90's on MTV.

In 1998, she released her third album, Mediamente isterica, a concept album representing different kind of female figures. This album was successful but not as much as her previous work, selling over 80,000 copies. Between December 1998 and February 1999, she was a regular guest of the Italia 1 variety show Comici.

=== 2000s ===
In 2000, she took part in the Sanremo Music Festival for the third time with the song "In bianco e nero", leading song of her fourth album Stato di necessità. The album also includes two of Carmen's best known songs, "Parole di burro" and "L'ultimo bacio", the latter becoming the theme song of the film with the same name by Gabriele Muccino. Stato di necessità became her most successful album, selling more than 300,000 copies in the first year. The same year, Consoli won two Italian Music Awards and a Nastro d'Argento Award.

In 2001, she held a summer tour with Paola Turci and Max Gazzè. The same year, she released her first live album, L'anfiteatro e la bambina impertinente. The album presents Consoli's greatest hits rearranged with an orchestra of sixty elements conducted by Paolo Buonvino.

A year later, she released her fifth studio album, L'eccezione. The album debuted at number 1 in the Italian album charts, selling more than 200,000 copies. The same year she founded a label, Due Parole, with the aim of supporting indie musicians. In 2003, thanks to the album's lyrics, she won a literary award, a special Grinzane Cavour Prize, and was awarded female artist of the year at the Italian Music Awards. 2003 also saw the release of her second live album, Un sorso in più – dal vivo a MTV Supersonic, published with the collaboration of MTV Italy. The album was recorded at MTV's program Supersonic the year before, when Carmen presented to the public L'eccezione. In 2004, she held her first tour in the United States, also performing at South by Southwest.

In 2006, her sixth studio album Eva contro Eva was released. Debuting at number 1, the album showed a new perspective of Consoli's music, this time enriched with traditional Sicilian sounds and ethnic influences. The album contains collaborations with Goran Bregovic and Angelique Kidjo. The same year, she recorded a successful duet with Franco Battiato, "Tutto l'universo obbedisce all'amore", for Battiato's album Fleurs 2. After a series of concerts through Europe, Canada and the United States Eva contro Eva was published in 2007 in the United States through Universal Latino. The same year, she composed the music of "Anna Magnani", with lyrics by Vincenzo Cerami, for the Adriano Celentano's album Dormi amore, la situazione non è buona.

In 2008, Consoli's third album Mediamente isterica was celebrated through a "Deluxe Edition" and a new tour. The same year she composed the original soundtrack for the film The Man Who Loves, directed by Maria Sole Tognazzi and starring Monica Bellucci, Pierfrancesco Favino and Ksenia Rappoport. Still in 2008, she recorded "L'appuntamento" in a duet with Ornella Vanoni for Vanoni's album Più di me.

Her seventh studio album Elettra was released on 30 October 2009, including first single "Non molto lontano da qui" and debuting at number 2 in the FIMI Italian Album Charts. The album sold in Italy more than 60,000 copies gaining platinum status; thanks to it, Consoli was the first female artist to win the Targa Tenco in the "Album of the Year" category. The same year, she took part to the charity single "Domani 21/04.09".

=== 2010s ===
In November 2010, Consoli released her first "best of" album, Per niente stanca; the album was anticipated by the single "Guarda l'alba", a collaboration with Tiziano Ferro. The second new song of the album, "AAA Cercasi", was released as a single in January 2011. The album debuted at the sixth place in the Italian Album Charts. In July 2011 she published her first video collection, which includes all her videos from 1996 to 2011 plus some extras.

In November 2014, Consoli released the single "L'abitudine di tornare", anticipating the album with the same name, released in January 2015. The album debuted at third place in the Italian Album Charts. The same year, she performed at Meltdown Festival. In 2016, she recorded with Tiziano Ferro the triple platinum single "Il conforto". The same year, she was named "maestro concertatore" (musical director) at Notte della Taranta, being the first woman to held this role. In 2017, she voiced Emma in the Italian version of the animated film Monster Family and performed the closing credits song with Max Gazzè.

In 2018, Consoli released a new live album, Eco di sirene, which debuted at the second place in the Italian hit parade.

=== 2020s ===
In 2020, she was chosen as the Italian performer for the song "Loyal Brave True", part of the Mulan soundtrack.

On 25 August 2021, Consoli held an anniversary concert at the Verona Arena for her first 25 years of career; originally planned for 2020 and postponed because of the COVID-19 pandemic, it had among its guests Ornella Vanoni, Elisa, Nada, Max Gazzè, Daniele Silvestri, Afterhours, Irene Grandi, Levante, Colapesce & Dimartino, Samuele Bersani, Marina Rei, Mario Venuti, Tosca, and Finaz. In September 2021, she released her ninth studio album, Volevo fare la rockstar, which debuted at the second place in the Italian Album Chart, and first on the Italian Vinyl Chart. Following the album release, she started a Volevo fare la rockstar Tour, with Marina Rei as a guest.

In June 2023, Consoli performed at Womad, being the first Italian female artist to perform at the festival. In August 2023, Consoli made a three-date mini-tour together with Elvis Costello, a project the two had originally planned in 2012 but that at the time had been shelved due to Consoli's pregnancy. The same year, she received a Premio Tenco for her career.

In 2024, Consoli made her acting debut in Tutto l'amore che ho, a Rosa Balistreri biopic in which she also served as composer; the film premiered at the 42nd Torino Film Festival and was released in Italian cinemas in May 2025. For her score she received a Nastro d'Argento nomination. A soundtrack album, L'amuri ca v'haju, was released on 8 May 2025. In October 2025, she released an album in Sicilian language, Amuri Luci. The album won the 2026 Targa Tenco for best album in dialect.

=== Personal life ===
Since 2006, Consoli is a Goodwill ambassador for UNICEF. In November 2012, she was bestowed the title of Cavaliere (Knight) of the Order of Merit of the Italian Republic. Consoli has a son, Carlo, conceived through artificial insemination.

== Discography ==
=== Studio albums ===
- 1996 Due parole (15,000 copies)
- 1997 Confusa e felice No. 6 ITA (130,000 copies), Platinum
- 1998 Mediamente isterica No. 4 ITA (80,000 copies), Platinum
- 2000 Stato di necessità No. 6 ITA (300,000 copies), 3× Platinum
- 2002 L'eccezione No. 1 ITA (200,000 copies), 2× Platinum
- 2006 Eva contro Eva No. 1 ITA No. 85 CH (80,000 copies), Platinum
- 2008 Mediamente isterica Deluxe - Anniversary Edition No. 22 ITA (11,000 copies)
- 2009 Elettra No. 2 ITA (80,000 copies), Platinum
- 2015 L'abitudine di tornare No. 3 ITA
- 2021 Volevo fare la rockstar No. 2 ITA
- 2025 Amuri luci No. 17 ITA

=== Greatest hits albums ===
- 2010 Per niente stanca No. 6 ITA (40,000 copies), Platinum
- 2017 The Platinum Collection

=== Live albums ===
- 2001 L'anfiteatro e la bambina impertinente No. 6 ITA (200,000 copies), 2× Platinum
- 2003 Un sorso in più – Dal vivo a MTV Supersonic No. 18 ITALIA
- 2018 Eco di sirene No. 2 ITA

=== International albums ===
- 2001 État de necessité – French version of Stato di necessità
- 2002/2003 Carmen Consoli – English version of L'Eccezione
- 2007 Eva contro Eva – Published in the United States by Universal Latino (in Italian)

=== Soundtracks ===
- 2008 L'uomo che ama
- 2025 L’amuri ca v’haju

=== Singles ===
- 1995 Quello che sento
- 1996 Amore di plastica
- 1996 Questa notte una lucciola illumina la mia finestra
- 1996 Lingua a sonagli
- 1997 Confusa e felice No. 3 ITA
- 1997 Venere
- 1997 Uguale a ieri
- 1998 Mai come ieri feat. Mario Venuti
- 1998 Bésame Giuda
- 1998 Puramente casuale
- 1999 Eco di sirene
- 1999 Autunno dolciastro
- 2000 In bianco e nero No. 10 ITA
- 2000 Parole di burro No. 4 ITA
- 2000 Orfeo
- 2001 L'ultimo bacio
- 2001 Gamine impertinente (France)
- 2002 L'eccezione No. 4 ITA
- 2003 Pioggia d'aprile – Gold Certification (15.000 copies)
- 2003 April Showers (Germany and Spain)
- 2003 Fiori d'arancio
- 2006 Signor Tentenna
- 2006 Tutto su Eva
- 2009 Domani – Artisti Uniti per l'Abruzzo No. 1 ITA – Multiplatinum Certification (562.000 copies)
- 2009 Non molto lontano da qui
- 2010 Mandaci una cartolina
- 2010 'A finestra
- 2010 Guarda l'alba No. 20 ITA
- 2011 AAA Cercasi No. 46 ITA
- 2015 L'abitudine di tornare
- 2015 Sintonia imperfetta
- 2015 Ottobre
- 2017 Il Conforto (Tiziano Ferro feat. Carmen Consoli) No. 4 ITA

=== DVDs ===
- 2001 L'anfiteatro e la bambina impertinente
- 2008 Eva contro Eva No. 2 ITA
- 2009 Amiche per l'Abruzzo No. 1 ITA (250.000 copies)
- 2011 Per niente stanca – Video Collection No. 7 ITA

== Videos ==
- 1996 Amore di plastica
- 1996 Lingua a sonagli
- 1998 Mai come ieri feat. Mario Venuti
- 1998 Bésame Giuda
- 1999 Eco di sirene
- 1999 Autunno dolciastro
- 2000 Parole di burro
- 2001 L'ultimo bacio
- 2002 L'eccezione
- 2003 Pioggia d'aprile
- 2003 Fiori d'arancio
- 2006 Signor Tentenna
- 2006 Tutto su Eva
- 2009 Non molto lontano da qui
- 2010 Guarda l'alba
- 2011 AAA cercasi
- 2015 L'abitudine di tornare
- 2015 Sintonia imperfetta
- 2015 Ottobre
- 2017 Il conforto (Tiziano Ferro feat. Carmen Consoli)
