= Tricarico (singer) =

Italian singer-songwriter

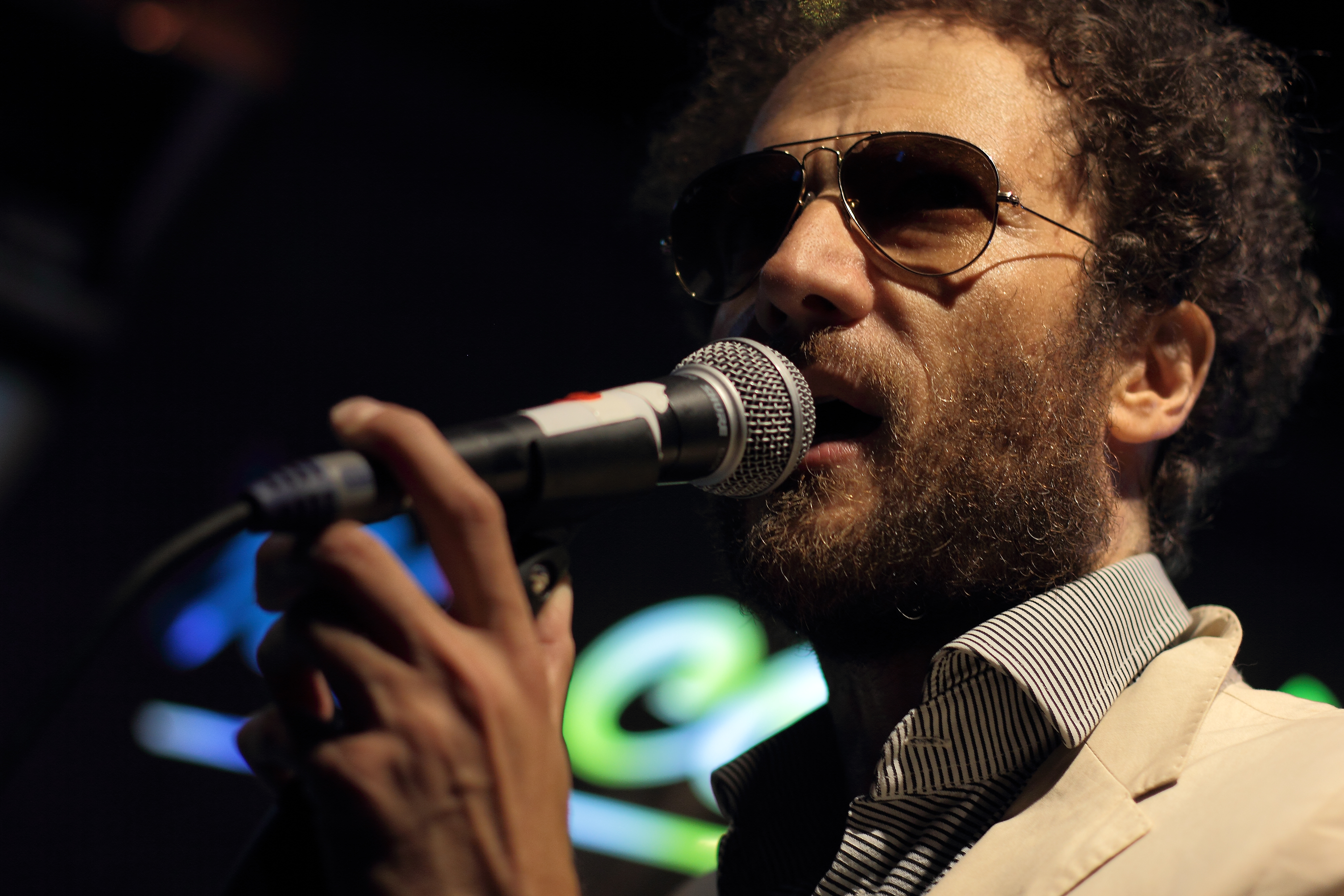

Background information
- Born: Francesco Maria Tricarico; 1 February 1971 (age 55); Milan, Italy
- Genres: Pop
- Occupation: Singer-songwriter
- Instrument: Vocals
- Years active: 2000–present

Francesco Maria Tricarico (born 1 February 1971), better known under the mononym Tricarico, is an Italian singer-songwriter. Tricarico is mainly known for his top-five hits "Io sono Francesco", released in 2000, and "Vita tranquilla", which was launched during the Sanremo Music Festival 2008.

== Music career ==
Tricarico rose to fame in 2000, when he released his debut single, "Io sono Francesco", which hit number one in Italy, selling more than 60,000 copies and generating some controversy following its lyrical content, which included an insult to a school teacher and was therefore censored by some radio stations. Tricarico's self-titled debut album was released two years later. After releasing his second album, Frescobaldo nel recinto, Tricarico wrote and recorded the song "Solo per te", which was played during the ending credits of Leonardo Pieraccioni's film I Love You in Every Language in the World. The song received a nomination for the Nastro d'Argento 2006 for Best Original song.

In 2009, Tricarico competed in the Big Artists section of the 58th Sanremo Music Festival with the song "Vita tranquilla", which received the Critics' Award "Mia Martini". The song was included in his third studio album, Giglio. Tricarico returned competing in the Sanremo Music Festival in 2009, performing the song "Il bosco delle fragole", and in 2011, singing "Tre colori", but both entries failed to reach the final. The songs were included in the albums Il bosco delle fragole (2009) and L'imbarazzo (2011), respectively.

In 2013, Tricarico released his sixth studio album, Invulnerabile.

== Discography ==
=== Studio albums ===
Title	Album details	Peak chart positions
Title	Album details	ITA
Tricarico	Released: 10 May 2002; Label: Universal; Format: CD	—
Frescobaldo nel recinto	Released: 8 June 2004; Label: Universal; Format: CD	—
Giglio	Released: 29 February 2008; Label: Sony BMG; Format: CD, digital download	8
Il bosco delle fragole	Released: 20 February 2009; Label: Sony BMG; Format: CD, digital download	33
L'imbarazzo	Released: 16 February 2011; Label: Sony; Formats: CD, digital download	53
Invulnerabile	Released: 2 April 2013; Label: Edel; Formats: CD, digital download	—

=== Compilation albums ===
- Il fantastico mondo di Francesco Tricarico (2009)

=== Singles ===
- "Io sono Francesco" (2000) – No. 1 in Italy
- "Drago" (2001)
- "La Pesca" (2001)
- "Musica" (2002)
- "Cavallino" (2004)
- "Sposa Laser" (2004)
- "Solo per te" (2006)
- "Cica bum l'Italia" (2006)
- "Un'altra possibilità" (2007)
- "Vita tranquilla" (2007) – No. 4 in Italy
- "Ghiaccio" (2008)
- "Eternità" (2008)
- "Il bosco delle fragole" (2009)
- "Luminosa" (2009)
- "Tre colori" (2011)
- "Una selva oscura" (2011)
- "La mia sposa" (2011)
- "L'America" (2013)
- "Riattacare i bottoni" (2013)
- "È di moda" (2014)
