= Kaballà =

- Born: July 7, 1953 (age 72); Caltagirone, Italy
- Genres: pop, rock, world music, tenor pop music
- Occupations: Musician; singer-songwriter

Giuseppe "Pippo" Rinaldi (born 7 July 1953), known by his stage name Kaballà, is an Italian musician and singer-songwriter.

== Biography ==
Kaballà has been living and working in Milan for many years. His distance from Sicily brings him to find “A lava stone bridge” which brings him back to memorable places.

=== LPs as singer-songwriter ===
- Petra Lavica (CGD 1991), is a fusion of work between popular music, rock and world music
- Le Vie Dei Canti (Polydor 1993)
- Lettere Dal Fondo Del Mare (Polydor 1996), is in the style of singer/songwriter mixed with electric sound American rock.
- Astratti Furori - live (Musica & Suoni 1998) is an anthology of his best songs, reproduced in an unplugged version and recorded during a live tour.

=== Career as a songwriter ===
In 1990 he wrote Sicilian words to Nino Rota's music, "Famous serenade", sung in the film The Godfather Part III by Francis Ford Coppola.

In 1991 he was a finalist at "Premio Tenco".

In 1992 he was a guest at Recanati's "Musicultura".

In 1996 he wrote the soundtrack to the Italo-Russian film La Delegazione by Alexander Galin.

In 1997 he composed the soundtrack to the short film Amati Matti, directed by Daniele Pignatelli, which participated in the 54th Venice Film Festival.

In 1999 he wrote the song "Non Ti Dimentico (Se non ci fossero le nuvole)", sung by Antonella Ruggiero at the Sanremo Music Festival.

In 2000 he was the songwriter of all the unreleased songs in the musical "Eppy, the Man Who Created the Myth of the Beatles".

In 2003 he adapted all the songs from the musical Fame to Italian.

In 2004 he wrote the song "Crudele", sung by Mario Venuti, winning the critique prize at the Sanremo Music Festival.

In 2005:

- He collaborated with Eros Ramazzotti, on the LP Calma apparente and on the unreleased songs on the double LP e², featuring the duets with Anastacia and Ricky Martin.
- He collaborated with Mario Venuti, and they wrote four LPs.
- He wrote "Echi d'infinito", sung by Antonella Ruggiero, winning the first position in the female singer category at the Sanremo Music Festival.

In 2006 he wrote "Un altro posto nel mondo", sung by Mario Venuti at the Sanremo Music Festival.

In 2008 he helped write some songs on Plácido Domingo's album Amore Infinito, an ambitious project launched from the idea to convert Pope John Paul II's poems and writings into songs. "La Tua Semplicità", a duet with the American tenor Josh Groban, is one of the songs on this album, together with "Canto del Sole Inesauribile", a song Plácido Domingo sings in a duet with Andrea Bocelli.

In 2008 he wrote "A Ferro e Fuoco", sung by Mario Venuti at the Sanremo Music Festival.

In 2010 he wrote "L'uomo che Amava le Donne" for Nina Zilli, winning the critique prize at the Sanremo Music Festival.

In 2013 he collaborated with Mario Incudine, a singer and musician at world music, in the production of the LP Italia, Talia.

In 2015 he and Mario Incudine sang the Sicilian translation of "Supplici di Eschilo" in the Greek Theatre of Syracuse, directed by Moni Ovadia and Mario Incudine with original music by Mario Incudine.

In 2017 he wrote

- "Le canzoni fanno male", sung by Marianne Mirage at the Sanremo Music Festival.
- "Caduto dalle stelle", sung by Mario Venuti.

In 2018 he wrote

- "Il futuro si è perso", sung by Umberto Alongi.

=== Tenor pop music ===
He worked on the international "tenor pop" record industry and Italian productions simultaneously, writing:

- an unreleased Italian song composed and produced by David Foster and interpreted by young American tenor Josh Groban;
- an Italian version of "Angels" by Robbie Williams, sung by young Austrian baritone singer Patrizio Buanne, and an Italian version of "I Will Always Love You" by Dolly Parton interpreted by Welsh soprano singer Katherine Jenkins;
- the Italian adaptations of many successful international hits (from Elton John to R.E.M.) interpreted by English tenor Tony Henry, accompanied by The Royal Philharmonic Orchestra;
- some compositions for ZAZ and the young tenor Vincent Niclo.

=== Artists for which he has written songs ===
Anna Oxa, Mietta, Antonella Ruggiero, Musica Nuda, Nick Nicolai, Susanna Parigi, Patrizia Laquidara, Carmen Consoli, Paola Turci, Raf, Ron, Alex Britti, Tazenda, Noemi, Alessandra Amoroso, Valerio Scanu and the winners of the first three editions of X Factor Aram Quartet, Matteo Becucci e Marco Mengoni are amongst the many artists that Kaballà has worked with throughout the years.

== Discography as singer ==
- Petra lavica (1991) - CGD Warner
- Le vie dei canti (1993) - Polydor
- Lettere dal fondo del mare (1996) - Polydor
- Astratti furori [live] (1998) - Musica & Suoni
