= Subsonica =

Italian rock band

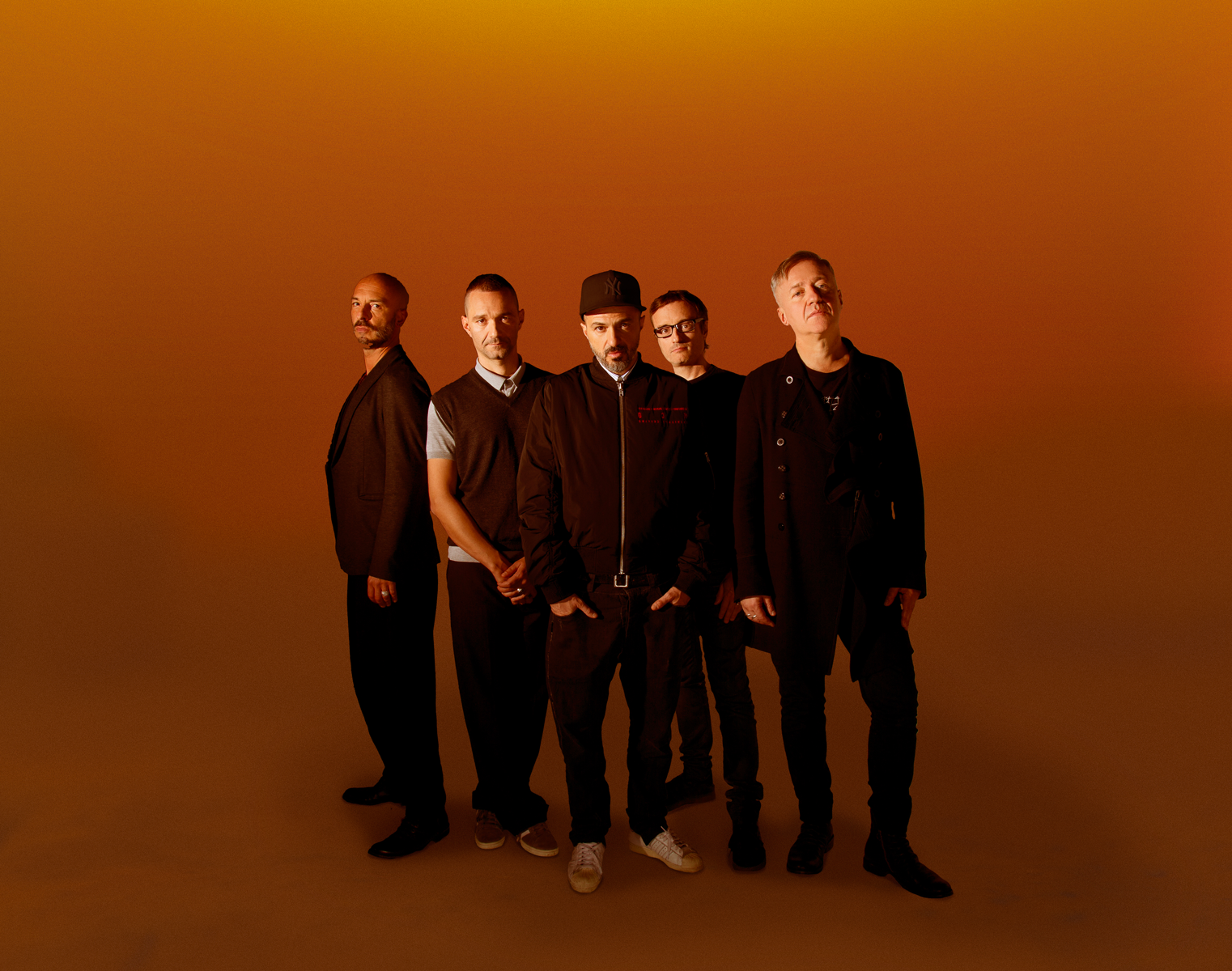
- Subsonica in 2020

Background information
- Origin: Turin, Italy
- Genres: Alternative rock; electronic rock; dance-rock; dance-punk
- Years active: 1996–present
- Labels: EMI; Virgin; Sony
- Members: Samuel Umberto Romano; Massimiliano Casacci; Davide Dileo; Enrico Matta; Luca Vicini
- Website: subsonica.it

Subsonica are an Italian band formed in Turin in 1996. Their eponymous debut album was released in the spring of 1997. The band gained significant success in 2000 by playing at the Sanremo Music Festival. The first two singles from the album Microchip emozionale, "Tutti i miei sbagli" ("All my mistakes") and "Discolabirinto" ("Discolabyrinth") were hits.

In their career they have produced 10 studio albums and sold nearly around 400,000 CDs.

Their latest studio album, Terre rare, was released in early 2026.

== Personnel ==
Current members

- Samuel Umberto Romano – vocals, guitars
- Massimiliano Casacci – vocals, guitars
- Davide Dileo – vocals, keyboards, piano, programming
- Enrico Matta – drums, percussion, programming
- Luca Vicini – bass, guitars

Former members

- Pierpaolo Peretti Griva – bass

== Discography ==
=== Studio albums ===
- Subsonica (1997)
- Microchip Emozionale (1999)
- Amorematico (2002)
- Terrestre (2005)
- L'Eclissi (2007)
- Eden (2011)
- Una Nave in una Foresta (2014)
- 8 (2018)
- Microchip Temporale (2019)
- Mentale Strumentale (2020)
- Realtà aumentata (2024)
- Terre Rare (2026)

=== Live albums ===
- Coi piedi sul palco (1998)
- Controllo del livello di rombo (2003)
- Terrestre live ed altre disfunzioni (2006)

=== Compilation albums ===
- Nel vuoto per mano (2008)

=== EPs ===
- Anomalia Subsonica (2003) (came out included with the official biography of the band)
- Il diluvio remixato (2011)

=== Video albums ===
- Cielo tangenziale ovest (2003)
- Be human: cronache terrestri – tour 2005 – 2006 (2006)
