= Mario Venuti =

Italian composer (born 1963)

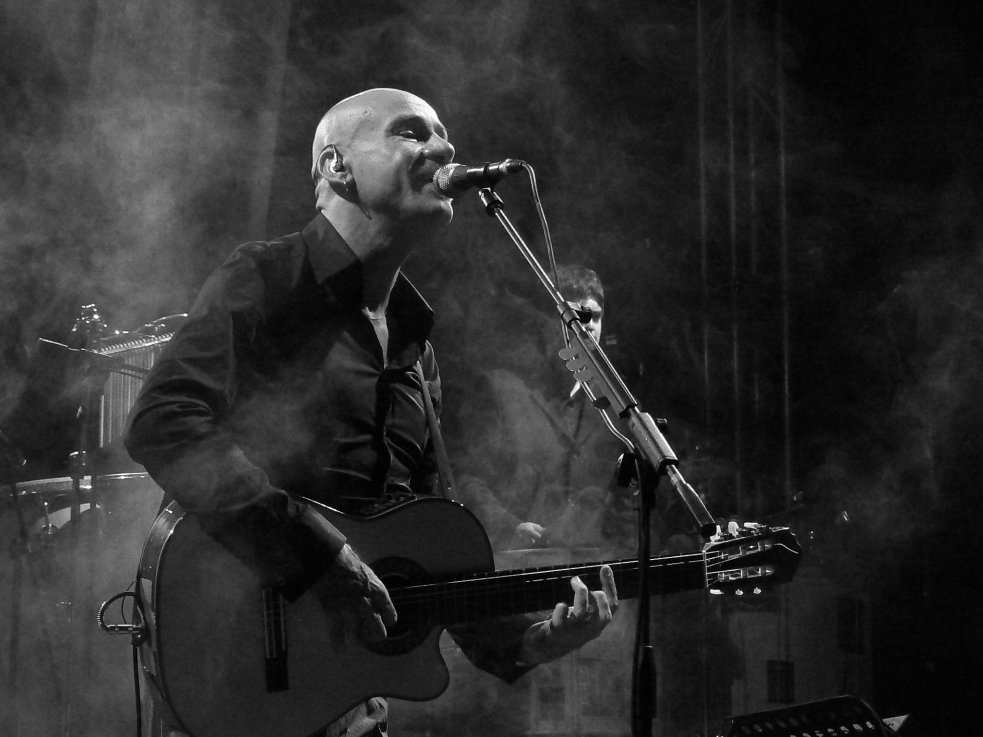
- Born: 28 October 1963 (age 62); Syracuse, Sicily, Italy
- Occupation: singer-songwriter

Mario Venuti (born 28 October 1963) is an Italian singer-songwriter, musician and record producer.

== Life and career ==
Born in Syracuse, Sicily, he started his career as a member of the new wave band Denovo. After the group disbanded, he debuted as a solo singer-songwriter in 1994, with the album Un po' di febbre. Following "Mai come ieri", a quite successful duet with Carmen Consoli, his solo career had his breakout in 2003, with the hit "Veramente". He collaborated as a songwriter with several artists, including Carmen Consoli, Delta-V, Raf and Antonella Ruggiero. He entered the main competition at the Sanremo Music Festival three times, winning the "Mia Martini" Critics Award in 2004 with the song "Crudele".

== Discography ==
Album

- 1994 – Un po' di febbre
- 1996 – Microclima
- 1998 – Mai come ieri
- 2003 – Grandimprese
- 2006 – Magneti
- 2009 – Recidivo
- 2012 – L'ultimo romantico
- 2014 – Il tramonto dell'occidente
