= Dulce María discography =

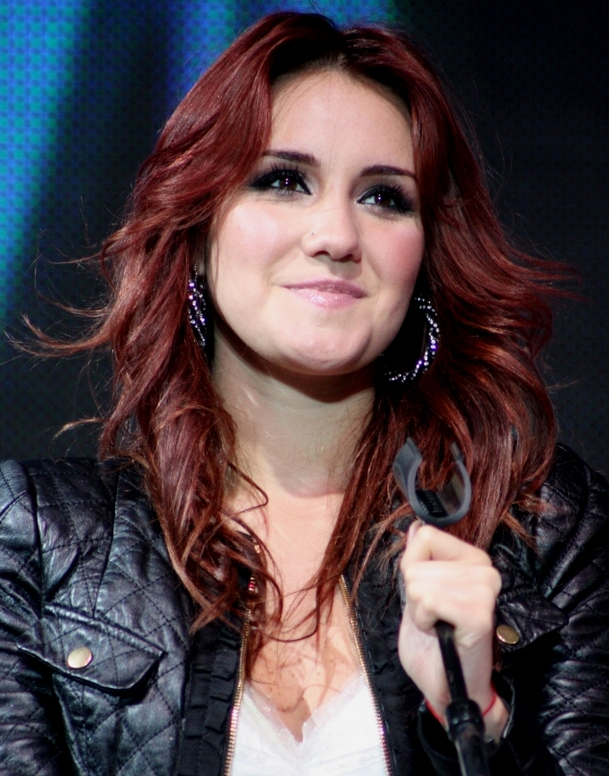
- Dulce María at Teletón 2011 (Mexico)
- Studio albums: 4
- Extended plays: 1
- Singles: 23
- Music videos: 15
- Lyric videos: 3

Dulce María, a Mexican singer, songwriter, actress and author, has released four studio albums, one EP and 23 singles, 14 music videos and two lyric videos.

== Albums ==
=== Studio albums ===
List of studio albums, with selected chart positions and details
Title	Album details	Peak chart positions		
Title	Album details	MEX	ESP	US
Extranjera - Segunda Parte	Released: 14 June 2011; Label: Universal Music México; Format: CD, digital download	29	24	— (Note: Extranjera - Segunda Parte did not enter the Billboard 200, but peaked at number 20 on the Latin Pop Albums chart.)
Sin Fronteras	Released: 8 April 2014; Label: Universal Music México; Format: CD, digital download	8	—	— (Note: Sin Fronteras did not enter the Billboard 200, but peaked at number 6 on the Latin Pop Albums chart. It also peaked at number 40 on the Top Latin Albums chart.)
DM	Released: 10 March 2017; Label: Universal Music México; Format: CD, digital download	8	40	— (Note: DM did not enter the Billboard 200, but peaked at number 14 on the Latin Pop Album Sales chart.)
Origen	Released: 22 October 2021; Label: Self-released; Format: Digital download	—	—	—
"—" denotes a recording that did not chart or was not released in that territory.

== EP ==
List of EP, with selected chart positions and details
Title	Album details	Peak chart positions					
Title	Album details	MEX	BRA	CRO	ESP	POL	US
Extranjera - Primera Parte	Released: 9 November 2010; Label: Universal Music México; Format: CD, digital download	1	6	6	9	— (Note: Extranjera - Primera Parte did not enter the weekly chart, but peaked at number 79 on the monthly chart.)	— (Note: Extranjera - Primera Parte did not enter the Billboard 200, but peaked at number 11 on the Latin Pop Albums chart. It also peaked at number 66 on the Top Latin Albums chart.)
"—" denotes a recording that did not chart or was not released in that territory.

== Singles ==
=== As lead artist ===
List of singles as lead artist, with selected chart positions and album name
Title	Year	Peak chart positions	Album
Title	Year	US	Album
"Verano"	2009	—	Non-album single
"Inevitable"	2010	— (Note: "Inevitable" did not enter the Billboard Hot 100, but peaked at number 45 on the Latin Digital Songs chart.)	Extranjera - Segunda Parte
"Ya no"	2010	—	Extranjera - Segunda Parte
"Es un drama (tema original de la serie Último año)"	2012	—	Non-album single
"Lágrimas" (feat. Julión Álvarez)	2013	—	Sin Fronteras
"Antes que ver el sol"	2014	—	Sin Fronteras
"No sé llorar"	2016	—	DM
"Volvamos" (feat. Joey Montana)	2016	—	DM
"Rompecorazones"	2017	—	DM
"Borrón y cuenta nueva"	2017	—	Non-album single
"Los caminos de la Vida" (y Alexander Acha)	2019	—	Non-album single
"Más tuya que mía"	2020	—	Non-album single
"Te daría todo"	2020	—	Non-album single
"Tú y Yo"	2020	—	Non-album single
""Color Esperanza" México"	2020	—	Non-album single
"Lo que ves no es lo que soy"	2020	—	Non-album single
"Nunca"	2021	—	Non-album single
"Te quiero mucho [Sinego Remix]" (y Naty Botero feat. Sinego B Side)	2021	—	Non-album single
"Amigos con derechos"	2021	—	Non-album single
"Ela tá movimentando" (y Kevin O Chris)	2021	—	Non-album single
"Céu azul" (Flay, Ferrugem)	2021	—	Non-album single
"Te Daria Tudo" (Priscilla Alcantara)	2021	—	Origen
"Amigos con derechos" (Marília Mendonça)	2021	—	Origen
"—" denotes a recording that did not chart or was not released in that territory.

=== As featured artist ===
List of singles as lead artist, with selected chart positions and album name
Title	Year	Album
"Beautiful" (Akon feat. Dulce María)	2009	Non-album single
"Navidad Navidad" (Arthur Hanlon feat. Dulce María and Chino & Nacho)	2010	Non-album single
"Pon el alma en el juego" (Luciano Pereyra feat. Cali y El Dandee, D-Niss, Dulce María y Sam Alves)	2015	Non-album single
"Me Beija (Besame)" (Sofia Oliveira feat. Dulce María)	2017	Non-album single

== Other songs ==
=== As lead artist ===
List of songs as lead artist, with album name
Title	Year	Album
"No regresa más" (Henry Méndez y Dulce María)	2014	Dale Mambo

=== As featured artist ===
List of songs as featured artist, with album name
Title	Year	Album
"Te sigue esperando mi corazón" (Río Roma feat. Dulce María)	2012	Al Fin Te Encontré (Edición Especial)
"Wake Up Beside Me" (Basshunter feat. Dulce María)	2013	Calling Time
"Entre azul y buenas noches" (JNS feat. Dulce María)	2018	90's Pop Tour 2

== Music videos ==
=== As lead artist ===
List of music videos as lead artist and directors
Title	Year	Director(s)	Ref.
"Inevitable"	2010	Francisco D'Amorim Lima	
"Ya no"	2011	Angel Flores, Chivo Escalante	
"Es un drama"	2012	Gianfranco Quattrini	
"Lágrimas" (feat. Julión Álvarez)	2013	David Rousseau	
"Ingenua"	2013	Mariano Dawidson, Eric Dawidson	
"Antes que ver el sol"	2014	Christian Cavazos	
"O lo haces tú o lo hago yo"	2014	Paco Ibarra	
"No regresa más" (& Henry Méndez)	2014	Pau Colomina	
"No sé llorar"	2016	Francisco Álvarez	
"Volvamos" (Joey Montana)	2016	Francisco Álvarez	
"Rompecorazones"	2017	Paco Álvarez	
"Tal vez en Roma"	2018	Unknown	
"Los caminos de la Vida" (y Alexander Acha)	2020	Unknown	
"Lo que ves no es lo que soy"	2020	Paco Álvarez	
"Amigos con derechos"	2020	Unknown	

=== As featured artist ===
List of music videos as lead artist and directors
Title	Year	Director(s)	Ref.
"Beautiful" (Akon feat. Dulce María)	2009	Unknown	
"Me beija (Besame)" (Sofia Oliveira feat. Dulce María)	2017	Unknown	

=== As an actress ===
List of music videos as an actress and directors
Title	Year	Director(s)	Ref.
"Kids" (OneRepublic)	2016	Hal Kirkland	

== Lyric videos ==
=== As lead artist ===
List of lyric videos and directors
Title	Year	Director(s)	Ref.
"Antes que ver el sol"	2014	Unknown	
"Dejarte de amar"	2016	Unknown	
"Te Daría Todo"	2021	Unknown	

=== As featured artist ===
List of lyric videos and directors
Title	Year	Director(s)	Ref.
"Céu azul" (Flay, Ferrugem)	2021	Unknown	
