= List of awards and nominations received by Dulce María =

Dulce María awards and nominations
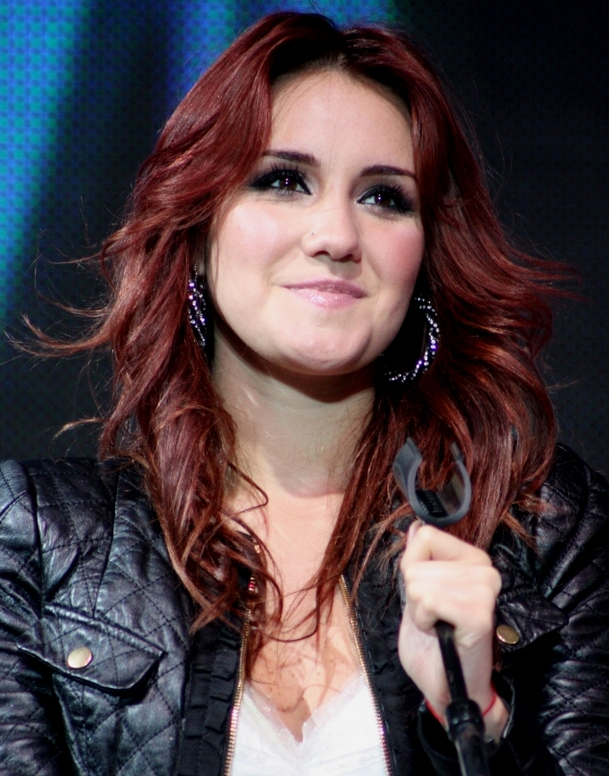
- Dulce Maria at Teleton 2011 in Mexico
Awards and nominations
Award	Wins	Nominations
Eliot Media Awards	1	1
Europe Music Awards	2	3
Lo Mejor de la Música Univision	1	1
Los Fan Choice Awards	1	1
MTV Millennials Awards	3	6
Nickelodeon	6	11
Premios Eclipse	2	2
Premios Febreteen	1	1
Premios G1 Globo	1	1
Premios Juventud	3	35
Premios Luminaria de Oro	1	1
Prêmios Mas que Telenovelas	1	1
Premio MTV Novelas	1	1
Premios People en Español	5	9
Premios Quiero	1	2
Premios Texas	3	3
Premios TVyNovelas	1	1
Premios TVZ	1	1

Totals (Note: Certain award groups do not simply award one winner. They acknowledge several different recipients, have runners-up, and have third place. Since this is a specific recognition and is different from losing an award, runner-up mentions are considered wins in this award tally. For simplification and to avoid errors, each award in this list has been presumed to have had a prior nomination.)
- Wins: 35
- Nominations: 86

Dulce María is a Mexican actress and singer-songwriter. In 2014, Dulce was nominated for Europe Music Awards, winning North Latin America Act and Best Latin America Act, being the first Mexican to reach the mundial category.

== Diosas de Plata ==
Year	Nominee / work	Award	Result
2015	¿Por qué los hombres son infieles?	Female Co-acting	Nominated

== Eliot Media Awards ==
Year	Nominee / work	Award	Result
2015	Dulce María	True Likes	Won

== MTV Europe Music Award ==
The MTV Europe Music Awards were established in 1994 by MTV Networks Europe to celebrate the most popular music videos in Europe.

Year	Nominee / work	Award	Result
2014	Dulce María	Best Latin America North Act	Won
2014	Dulce María	Best Latin America Act	Won
2014	Dulce María	Best Worldwide Act	Nominated

== Lo Mejor de la Música Univision ==
Year	Nominee / work	Award	Result
2011	Extranjera	Best Album	Won

== Los Fan Choice Awards ==
Year	Nominee / work	Award	Result
2015	Dulce María	Best Showcase of The Year	Won

== MTV Millennials Awards ==
Year	Nominee / work	Award	Result
2013	Dulce María	Twitter Star	Won
2013	Dulcetes	Best Fandom	Won
2014	Dulce María	Latin Instagram Star	Won
2014	Dulce María	Latin Twitter Star	Nominated
2015	Dulce María	Mexican Instagram Star	Nominated
2015	O Lo Haces Tú O Lo Hago Yo	Hit of The Year	Nominated

== Nickelodeon Kids' Choice Awards ==
The Nickelodeon Kids' Choice Awards is an annual awards show, that honors the year's biggest television, movie, and music acts, as voted by the people.

Year	Nominee / work	Award	Result
2012	Dulce María	Favorite Latin Artist	Nominated
2015	Dulce María	Favorite Latin Artist	Won

=== Nickelodeon Mexico Kids' Choice Awards ===
The Nickelodeon Kids Choice Awards Mexico is an annual awards show that awards entertainers with a blimp trophy, as voted by kids on internet.

Year	Nominee / work	Award	Result
2011	Dulce María	Favorite Latin Solo Act	Won
2011	Dulce María	Pro-social Award	Won
2012	Dulce María	Favorite Latin Solo Act	Nominated
2015	Dulce María	Favorite National Solo or Group Act	Nominated
2015	"O Lo Haces Tú O Lo Hago Yo"	Favorite Song	Won
2016	Dulce María	Favorite National Solo or Group Act	Won
2016	Dulce María	Trendy Girl	Nominated

=== Meus Prêmios Nick ===
Meus Prêmios Nick (Portuguese for "My Nick Awards"), the Brazilian version of the American Kids' Choice Awards, was launched in 2000, and held annually ever since. The artists most voted by viewers are awarded a hollow orange blimp figurine called "Zeppy".

Year	Nominee / work	Award	Result
2011	Dulce María	Favorite International Artist	Won
2014	Dulce María	Favorite International Artist	Nominated

== Orgullosamente Latino ==
Year	Nominee / work	Award	Result
2010	Dulce María	Latin Female Solo Artist	Nominated
2010	Inevitable	Latin Song of the Year	Nominated

== Premios Eclipse ==
Year	Nominee / work	Award	Result
2010	Dulce María	Best Pop Act	Won
2010	Extranjera	Best Album of the Year	Won

== Premios FebreTeen ==
Year	Nominee / work	Award	Result
2016	Dulce María	Latin Artist of the Year	Won

== Premios G1 Globo ==
Year	Nominee / work	Award	Result
2010	Dulce María	Best Female Singer	Won

== Premios Juventud ==
Year	Nominee / work	Award	Result
2005	Dulce María	Girl of My Dreams	Nominated
2005	Dulce María	She's Got Style	Nominated
2005	Dulce María	iQue rico se mueve! (Best moves)	Nominated
2005	Dulce María and Alfonso Herrera	Hottest Romance	Won
2006	Dulce María	She's Got Style	Won
2006	Dulce María	Girl of My Dreams	Nominated
2006	Dulce María	iQue rico se mueve! (Best moves)	Nominated
2006	Dulce María	My Idol is...	Nominated
2006	Dulce María and Guillermo Ochoa	Hottest Romance	Nominated
2007	Dulce María	iQue rico se mueve! (Best moves)	Nominated
2007	Dulce María	Girl of My Dreams	Nominated
2007	Dulce María	She's Got Style	Nominated
2007	Dulce María	My Idol is...	Nominated
2008	Dulce María	Girl of My Dreams	Nominated
2008	Dulce María	iQue rico se mueve! (Best moves)	Nominated
2008	Dulce María	She's Got Style	Nominated
2008	Dulce María	My Idol is...	Nominated
2009	Dulce María	Girl of My Dreams	Nominated
2009	Dulce María	iQue rico se mueve! (Best moves)	Nominated
2009	Dulce María	She's Got Style	Nominated
2009	"El Regalo Más Grande" (ft. Tiziano Ferro and Anahí)	The Perfect Combo	Nominated
2009	Dulce María	My Idol is...	Nominated
2009	Dulce María	Paparazzi's Favorite Target	Nominated
2009	Dulce María	Favorite Vocal	Nominated
2009	Dulce María	Favorite pop star	Nominated
2009	"El Verano"	Catchiest Tune	Nominated
2009	Dulce María and Pablo Lyle	Hottest Romance	Nominated
2011	Extranjera	I Hear Her Everywhere	Nominated
2011	Dulce María	iQue rico se mueve! (Best moves)	Nominated
2011	Dulce María	She's Got Style	Won
2013	"Es Un Drama"	Catchiest Tune	Nominated
2013	"Es Un Drama"	My Favorite Video	Nominated
2013	"Es Un Drama"	My Ringtone	Nominated
2013	Dulce María	Favourite pop star	Nominated
2016	"Dejarte de Amar"	Best Ballad	Nominated

== Premios Lo Nuestro ==
Year	Nominee / work	Award	Result
2012	Dulce María	Best New Pop Artist or Group of The Year	Nominated

== Premios Luminaria de Oro ==
Year	Nominee / work	Award	Result
2011	Extranjera	Best Album of The Year	Won

== Prêmios Mas Que Telenovelas ==
Year	Nominee / work	Award	Result
2013	Mentir Pra Vivir	Favorite Female Special Acting	Won

== Premios MTV Novelas ==
Year	Nominee / work	Award	Result
2013	Es Un Drama	Best Musical Theme	Won

== Premios People en Español ==
Year	Nominee / work	Award	Result
2009	Verano de Amor	Best Young Actress	Won
2010	Inevitable	Best Song Of The Year	Nominated
2010	Dulce María	Best Pop Artist/Group	Won
2011	Extranjera	Best Album	Nominated
2011	Dulce María	Best Pop Artist/Group	Nominated
2012	Dulce María	Queen of Facebook	Won
2013	Lágrimas _{feat. Julión Álvarez}	Collaboration Of The Year	Won
2014	Dulce María	Favorite Female Act	Won

== Premios Quiero ==
Year	Nominee / work	Award	Result
2010	Inevitable	Best Female Video	Nominated
2011	Ingenua	Best Female Video	Won

== Premios Telehit ==
Year	Nominee / work	Award	Result
2010	Dulce María	Young Act Of The Year	Nominated

== Premios Texas ==
Year	Nominee / work	Award	Result
2011	Dulce María	Best Rock Act	Won
2012	Dulce María	Favorite Female Act	Won
2012	Dulce María	Best Pop Act	Won

== Premios TVyNovelas ==
Year	Nominee / work	Award	Result
2006	Rebelde	Best Young Female Special Acting	Won

== Premios TVZ ==
Year	Nominee / work	Award	Result
2010	Dulce María	International Artist	Won

== Recognitions ==
- 2006: Quien magazine named her one of "Most Beautiful of 2006", heading the list.
- 2007: People en Español magazine named her one of "50 Most Beautiful".
- 2010: Quien magazine named her one of "Most Beautiful of 2006", heading the list.
- 2010: People en Español magazine named her one of "50 Most Beautiful".
- 2011: Won a plate at "PLAZA DE LAS ESTRELLAS" in recognition of her artistic career.
- 2011: Won platinum album in Brazil by selling more than 40,000 copies of her album Extranjera.
- 2011: Vip magazine named her one of "The 100 Sexiest Women of all time".
- 2011: The magazine People en Español named her one of "50 Most Beautiful".
- 2012: Caras magazine named her one of "20 Most Beautiful".
- 2014: Febre Teen magazine named her "Latin Star of the Year".
- 2015: Para Todos magazine gave an "Best Latin Singer" award for her at the 20th Anniversary of the magazine.
- 2015: The musical "Rock Of Ages" win a "Placa De Bronze" at "Plaza De Las Estrella".
- 2015: Was the Mexican with the best peak (#7) at Billboard Social 50.
- 2015: Agrupación de Periodistas Teatrales (APT) named the musical "Rock of Ages) as "Best Rock Musical".
- 2016: People en Español magazine named her one of "50 Most Beautiful".
- 2016: TVyNovelas magazine named her one of The Most Beautiful Of Mexico.
