= Alla mia età =

Alla mia età may refer to:

- Alla mia età (album), a 2008 album by Tiziano Ferro
- "Alla mia età" (song), a song from the album
