= A mi edad =

A mi edad may refer to:

- Alla mia età (album), by Tiziano Ferro with a Spanish version named A mi edad
  - "Alla mia età" (song), the title song from the album
