= Volvamos =

Single by Dulce María featuring Joey Montana

from the album DM
- Released: September 23, 2016
- Genre: Reggaeton
- Length: 3:34
- Label: Universal Latin
- Songwriters: Joey Montana; Andrés Saavedra; Victor Delgado
- Producer: Victor Delgado "Predikador"

Dulce María singles chronology
"No Sé Llorar" (2016)	"Volvamos" (2016)	"Rompecorazones" (2017)

Joey Montana singles chronology
"Hola" (2016)	"Volvamos" (2016)	"Envidia" (2017)

Music video
- Volvamos on YouTube

"Volvamos" is the second single from the third studio album by Mexican actress, singer and songwriter Dulce María. The single is a collaboration with the Panamanian singer Joey Montana, who was also the composer of that song with Andrés Saavedra. It was released on September 23, 2016. The song has urban rhythms and influences in reggaeton and Latin pop.

The song reached number one on iTunes in 13 countries.

== Music video ==
On October 15, 2016, Dulce María announced on their social networks, with a teaser, the release date of the video. It was released worldwide on October 18, 2016 by Ritmoson Latino and on October 19, 2016 on the singer's Vevo channel. This is about a couple who ended their relationship but feel like coming back.

The video was well received, it reached number one on iTunes in 13 countries.

== Charts ==
Chart (2016–17)	Peak position
Ecuador Pop (Monitor Latino)	9
Guatemala (Dzibeles)	73
Mexico Hot Song General (Monitor Latino)	10
Mexico Espanol Airplay (Billboard)	15
Mexico Airplay (Billboard)	47
Mexico Pop (Monitor Latino)	5
Mexico Pop Audiencia (Monitor Latino)	7
Panamá Pop (Monitor Latino)	4

=== Year-end charts ===
Chart (2016)	Position
Ecuador Pop (Monitor Latino)	77
Mexico Pop (Monitor Latino)	73
Panamá (Monitor Latino)	76
Panamá Pop (Monitor Latino)	8
