= Sin Fronteras =

Sin Fronteras (Spanish, translating as 'without borders') may refer to:

- Sin Fronteras (Dulce María album), 2014
- Sin Fronteras (Makano album), 2010
