= Naty Botero (album) =

Studio album by Naty Botero
- Released: 31 August 2006
- Recorded: New York City, United States
- Genre: Pop
- Length: 45:11
- Label: Sony, Columbia
- Producer: Naty Botero, Christian Castagno

Naty Botero chronology
Naty Botero (2006)	Adicta (2009)

Singles from Naty Botero
- 1. "Te Quiero Mucho" Released: 1 Sep 2006; 2. "Dinosaurio" Released: 4 Apr 2007; 3. "Mío" Released: 3 Sept 2007; 4. "Fuego" Released: 12 Feb 2008

Professional ratings
Review scores
Source	Rating
Rolling Stone	Link

Naty Botero is the first studio album by Colombian pop-rock singer Naty Botero, released by Sony BMG on August 31, 2006 outside Colombia.

== Track listing ==
Botero co-wrote and co-produced each track on the album.

No.	Title	Length
1.	"Si Es Pa Ti"	2:27
2.	"Dinosaurio"	2:53
3.	"Fuego"	2:51
4.	"Camino Del Sol"	3:41
5.	"Che"	4:05
6.	"La Costa"	3:18
7.	"Te Quiero Mucho"	3:37
8.	"Animal"	3:23
9.	"Grillo"	4:15
10.	"Mio"	3:36
11.	"Tu Eres Un Indio"	3:12
12.	"Colombia"	4:12
13.	"Dinosaurio" ((Original Version))	4:28

== Charts ==
Chart (2006/2007)	Peak position
Colombian Album Chart	1
Mexican Album Chart	7
Spanish Album Chart	95
US Billboard Latin Pop Albums	49
