= Te Quiero Mucho =

Single by Naty Botero

from the album Naty Botero
- Released: 1 Sept 2006
- Recorded: 2006
- Genre: Pop, Electropop
- Length: 3:42
- Label: Sony BMG Music, Columbia Records
- Songwriters: Naty Botero, C Castagno

"Te Quiero Mucho" is the first official single from Naty Botero's debut studio album, Naty Botero.

In 2021 Botero released a remix with Dulce María.

== Music video ==
Naty Botero in the "Te Quiero Mucho" video.

The story of the music video was inspired by 1970s action movies, especially Russ Meyer. This concept was developed by the music video director, Diego Álvarez, and also Naty, who was involved in every detail of the video shoot.

The scenes were recreated in Mexico City were the metropolis was the principal character, showing Latin American style and a strong woman fighting at night against criminals, Barbarella style. "Te Quiero Mucho" is a music video directed to show strength and feminine independence, two innate characteristics of Naty Botero.

The director of the video, Diego Álvarez, is radicated on Mexico City and he has been involved with a lot of projects on MTV.

== Charts ==
Chart (2006)	Peak position
US Latin Songs	27
US Latin Pop Songs	9
Chart (2007)	Peak position
US Hot Dance Club Play	47
