= Breathe Gentle =

Single by Tiziano Ferro featuring Kelly Rowland

from the album Alla mia età
- B-side: "Indietro"
- Released: February 20, 2009
- Genre: R&B
- Length: 3:42
- Label: EMI
- Songwriters: Tiziano Ferro; Ivano Fossati; Billy Mann
- Producer: Michele Canova

Tiziano Ferro singles chronology
"Il regalo più grande" (2009)	"Breathe Gentle" (2009)	"Il sole esiste per tutti" (2009)

Kelly Rowland singles chronology
"No Future in the Past" (2008)	"Breathe Gentle" (2009)	"When Love Takes Over" (2009)

Music video
- "Breathe Gentle" on YouTube

"Breathe Gentle" is a song by Italian singer-songwriter Tiziano Ferro with featured vocals by American singer Kelly Rowland. It was released on 20 February 2009 as the third single from Ferro's fourth studio album Alla mia età.

It was written and composed by Ferro, Ivano Fossati and Billy Mann. An Italian language version, "Indietro", also appears on the album, without Rowland's vocals.

The song reached #1 on the Italian Airplay Charts and #9 on the Dutch Top 40.

== Music video ==
The music video for the song was shot at Lake Garda, directed by Gaetano Morbioli and its content is similar to that of James Bond movies. In the video, Ferro and Rowland are two thieves living a dangerous love story. In the end, they are close to getting caught by the police after a heist apparently staged to steal a valuable diamond, but they manage to fly away together successfully in a helicopter. Parts of the video were filmed at Villa Ansaldi, a 12-hectare lakeside estate near Sirmione featuring its own helipad, which later became known as the former residence of Austrian businessman René Benko.

== Formats and track listings ==
Digital single

1. "Breathe Gentle" (album version) – 3:41
2. "Indietro" (Live @ Rolling Stone) – 3:45

EP album

1. "Breathe Gentle" (album version) – 3:41
2. "Alla mia età" (acoustic remix) – 3:28
3. "Breathe Gentle" (Tiziano's audio comment) – 1:42

== Charts ==
Weekly charts

Chart (2009)	Peak position
Belgium (Ultratip Bubbling Under Wallonia)	13
CIS Airplay (TopHit)	184
Italy (FIMI)	2
Netherlands (Dutch Top 40)	9
Netherlands (Single Top 100)	7

Year-end charts

Chart (2009)	Position
Italy (FIMI)	13
Netherlands (Dutch Top 40)	60

== Certifications ==
Region	Provider	Certification(s)	Sales
Italy	FIMI	Platinum	70,000
