= Adicta =

Studio album by Naty Botero
- Released: 25 November 2009
- Recorded: Bogotá, Colombia
- Genre: Pop
- Length: 55:11
- Label: EMI Music
- Producers: Naty Botero, Christian Castagno

Naty Botero chronology
Naty Botero (2006)	Adicta (2009)	Coraje (2013)

Singles from Adicta
- 1. "Esta Noche Es Nuestra" Released: 30 Sep 2009; 2. "Tu Amor Me Parte En Dos" Released: 6 Dec 2009; 3. "Niño Loco" Released: 4 May 2010; 4. "Adicta" Released: 3 Sep 2010; 5. "Knokeada" Released: 1 Apr 2011; 6. "Mucho Mas" Released: 1 Jan 2012

Professional ratings
Review scores
Source	Rating
Rolling Stone	3.0/5 stars

Adicta is the Second studio album by Colombian pop-rock singer Naty Botero, released by EMI Music in Colombia

== Track listing ==
Botero co-wrote and co-produced all of the songs on the album.

No.	Title	Length
1.	"Veneno"	2:27
2.	"Esta Noche Es Nuestra" (feat. Joe Arroyo)	2:53
3.	"Adicta"	2:51
4.	"Vamos Arriba"	3:41
5.	"Tu Amor Me Parte En Dos"	4:05
6.	"Niño Loco"	3:18
7.	"Mucho Mas"	3:37
8.	"Knockeada"	3:23
9.	"Amazonica"	4:15
10.	"Dueño De Mi"	3:36
11.	"Demasiado Malo"	3:12
12.	"C'est La Vie"	4:12
13.	"Esta Noche Es Nuestra" (Diamantes Club Mix)	4:28

== Musical videos ==
- "Esta Noche Es Nuestra"
- "Tu Amor Me Parte En Dos"
- "Niño Loco"
- "Adicta"
- "Knokeada"
- "Mucho Más"

== Charts ==
Chart (2009)	Peak position
Colombian Album Chart	3
