= Inevitable (Dulce María song) =

Single by Dulce María

from the album Extranjera
- Released: May 11, 2010
- Recorded: 2009–2010
- Genre: Pop, dance-pop, electropop, pop rock
- Length: 3:08
- Label: Universal Music
- Songwriters: Dulce María, Andrea Hernandez, AXL
- Producer: AXL

Dulce María singles chronology
"Verano" (2009)	"Inevitable" (2010)	"Ya No" (2010)

Music video
- "Inevitable on YouTube

"Inevitable" is the official solo debut single by the Mexican singer Dulce María, after having two songs from her soap opera Verano de amor released digitally, as well as a successful duet with Akon in "Beautiful" and Tiziano Ferro in "El Regalo Más Grande". It was written by herself, as most part of the songs on her debut album Extranjera.

The first song teasers, lasting 10 to 15 seconds in length, were released on May 5 and May 8, 2010. The song was to be released digitally worldwide on May 18, 2010, but was released on May 11, 2010 in Mexico, due to it leaking online, as confirmed by María herself, through her YouTube page. On May 18, 2010 it also started playing on the radio stations in Mexico, Spain, Argentina, United States, and various other countries.

== Music video ==
The music video was filmed in Buenos Aires, Argentina during the first week of April 2010. Through her Twitter account, Dulce mentioned they were filming in an abandoned factory. On May 14, 2010, a 30 second teaser of the music video was released, again, through her YouTube channel. The video was released on May 24, 2010 on her VEVO channel. It features Dulce María having a dream about her driver, playing several different versions of her, together, taping him onto a chair, dancing in order to seduce him, as well as singing with a microphone, what shows how much obsessed with her, the driver is. The video has had more than 5 million views on YouTube, making it the most seen video from a former member of RBD.

== Track listings ==
- Digital download
1. "Inevitable" — 3:08

== Commercial performance ==
In Argentina, the song was the seventh most played song by local radios, becoming the most successful song interpreted by a former member of RBD, in that country. Even not charting in countries like Brazil and Spain, the song was played in a lot of popular TV shows there, such as Ídolos and Gran Hermano.

== Accolades ==
Year	Ceremony	Award	Result
2010	Orgullosamente Latino Award	Latin Song of the Year	Nominated
2010	Premios Quiero	Best Female Video Artist	Nominated
2010	Premios People en Español	Best Song of the Year	Nominated

== Charts ==
=== Weekly charts ===
Chart (2010)	Peak position
Mexico (Monitor Latino)	10
Peru (UNIMPRO)	17
US Latin Pop Digital Songs Sales (Billboard)	24
US Tropical Detections (Billboard)	30

=== Year-end charts ===
Chart (2010)	Position
Mexico (Monitor Latino)	50

== Certifications ==
Certifications for "Inevitable"
Region	Certification	Certified units/sales
Brazil (Pro-Música Brasil)	Gold	30,000^{‡}
^{‡} Sales+streaming figures based on certification alone.
