= Antes Que Ver El Sol =

Single by Dulce María

from the album Sin Fronteras
- Released: January 7, 2014
- Recorded: 2014
- Studio: M. G. Studios (Madrid, Spain)
- Genre: Pop rock
- Length: 3:32
- Label: Universal Music
- Songwriter: Roberto Fidel "Coti" Ernesto Sorokin Esparza
- Producer: Coti

Dulce María singles chronology
"Lágrimas" (2013)	"Antes Que Ver El Sol" (2014)	"O Lo Haces Tú O Lo Hago Yo" (2014)

Music video
- "Antes Que Ver El Sol" on YouTube

"Antes Que Ver El Sol" is a song recorded by Mexican singer Dulce María. It is the second single from the album Sin Fronteras (2014). The song is a cover of a classic track by Argentine singer-songwriter Coti. The single was released on January 7, 2014.

Coti's Spanish rock track is turned into a poppier affair with Dulce's sweet vocals. "Antes que ver el sol prefiero escuchar tu voz," she sings over some light accordion and guitar. Dulce basks in the sunny production of "Antes Que Ver El Sol" and she rises to the feel good occasion.

In August 2013 Dulce María confirmed in an interview with the Sinal Magazine that she was going to record in Portuguese the song "Antes Que Ver el sol" with Brazilian singer Manu Gavassi. Dulce's music producer, Luis Luisillo, used Twitter to make the announcement as well. "There are many Brazilians connected... Someone there knows Manu Gavassi," he wrote in his microblog account.

== Background ==
On August 24, 2013 by Twitter of EnCorto Magazine - a free magazine and Shows General Interest circulating in Mexico City and the Metropolitan Area of Mexico each week - said the new album Sin Fronteras by Dulce María included a cover of Coti, this is the song "Antes Que Ver El Sol" great success of the first solo album of singer in 2002.

On December 10, 2013. The program 'Hoy' showed backstage recording new music video of the second single from the singer. During the matter, the singer confirms that "Antes Que Ver El Sol" is the successor of Lágrimas.

== Music video ==
The video was filmed in Laguna Salada in Mexicali and Ocotillo Desert in California - USA, natural y flagship locations in South California. With the direction of Christian Cavazos and production of Carlos Vizcarra and Gabriel Felix.

In the music video for "Antes Que Ver El Sol," Dulce hitchhikes across an arid desert. She makes her way to the side of the road and gets picked up by an on-screen beau. The two lovebirds cruise in a vintage car and embrace the open highway. Things really heat up by the end when they get cozy in the bedroom. Dulce manages to capture the feel good vibes behind "Antes Que Ver El Sol" in her exhilarating clip.

It was released on 10 February at VEVO.

== Formats and track listings ==
- Digital download
1. "Antes Que Ver El Sol" – 3:31
- CD single
1. "Antes Que Ver El Sol" – 3:32

== Charts ==
Chart (2014)	Peak position
Mexico (Billboard - México Español Airplay)	21
Mexico (Monitor Latino - Pop)	19
Brazil - Billboard Brasil (Brasil Hot 100 Airplay)	13
Brazil - Billboard Brasil (Brasil Pop & Popular Songs)	7
Brazil - Billboard Brasil (Hot Internacional Songs])	4
Brazil - Billboard Brasil (Brasil Digital Songs)	2

== Release history ==
Country	Date	Format	Label(s)
Worldwide	January 7, 2014	Radio, Digital download	Universal Music Latin
