= Sin Fronteras (Dulce María album) =

Studio album by Dulce María
- Released: April 8, 2014
- Recorded: 2012–2013
- Genre: Pop
- Length: 42:59
- Language: Spanish
- Label: Universal Music Latin
- Producers: Coti Sorokin, Dudu Borges

Dulce María chronology
Extranjera (2011)	Sin Fronteras (2014)	DM (2017)

Singles from Sin Fronteras
- 1. "Lágrimas" Released: September 5, 2013; 2. "Antes Que Ver El Sol" Released: January 7, 2014; 3. "O Lo Haces Tú O Lo Hago Yo" Released: May 21, 2014

Sin Fronteras (English: Without Borders) is the second solo studio album by Mexican singer-songwriter Dulce María. It was released on digital retailers on April 8, 2014 via Universal Music Latin. "Different, energetic and passionate" are the words with which Dulce Maria described her second solo album.

This project features the collaboration of Coti Sorokin, whom Dulce María had long-awaited for to work with in at least one song. Sorokin, the famous Argentinean singer/songwriter, not only shared with her a few of his songs, but also produced some of her tracks. This makes Dulce María the third Mexican artist to be produced by Coti, after Julieta Venegas and Paulina Rubio.

It comes preceded by the lead single Lágrimas and the second single Antes Que Ver El Sol, a cover from the original song by Coti. The third single is the song "O Lo Haces Tú O Lo Hago Yo" written by the singer.

The album features several participations, including "Te Quedarás" with Frankie J.

== Singles ==
The album's lead single was Lágrimas where the singer partners with Julión Álvarez, the song was officially launched on 5 September 2013, but was released for digital download on iTunes on September 17, 2013 by Universal Music Mexico. The video of the song was released on November 5, 2013 on the official channel of the singer on VEVO, where it already has over 14 million views.

The second single from the album was the song Antes Que Ver El Sol, which was launched on January 7, 2014 on iTunes. It was a radio hit and debuted in several music charts. The song has a Portuguese version made for Brazil, which features singer and actress Manu Gavassi. The music video of the song was released, and has surpassed the 3 million views mark.

The third and final single from the album is the song “O Lo Haces Tú O Lo Hago Yo” was announced on May 21 during the singers promotion for the album to the Mexican media. The music video for the song was released September 19, 2014.

== Track listing ==
No.	Title	Writer(s)	Length
1.	"Si Tú Supieras"	Dulce María Saviñón, Alvaro de La Madrid, Pambo	2:32
2.	"Lágrimas" (with Julión Álvarez)	Koko Stambuk	3:20
3.	"Antes Que Ver El Sol"	Coti Sorokin	3:31
4.	"Te Quedarás" (with Frankie J)	Claudia Brant, Sorokin	3:45
5.	"Corazón En Pausa"	Brant, Sorokin	3:28
6.	"Después de Hoy"	Francisco Oroz, Diego Ortega, Dahiu Rosenblatt	2:57
7.	"Yo Sí Queria"	Saviñón, José Luis Roma	4:05
8.	"Cementerio De Los Corazones Rotos"	Saviñón, Juan Carlos Moguel, Rosenblatt	3:02
9.	"O Lo Haces Tú O Lo Hago Yo"	Saviñón, Oroz, Rosenblatt	3:03
10.	"Girando En Un Tacón"	Daniel Betancourt, Jannette Chao	3:09
11.	"Shots de Amor" (with Naty Botero and Pambo)	Saviñón, Xuan Long, Juan Carlos Moguel	2:15
12.	"Antes Que Ver El Sol (Portugués Version)" (with Manu Gavassi)	Coti Sorokin	3:31
13.	"En Contra"	Malakai	3:16
Total length:			42:59

== Charts ==
It has become a hit in the iTunes music store, seizing the No.1 in the Pop list and No. 2 in the general list on iTunes Mexico. The album reached great positions in 15 countries, including Brazil, Mexico, USA, Spain, Slovenia, Poland, Austria and several countries in Latin America.

Chart (2014)	Peak position
Mexican Albums (Top 100)	8
Mexican Albums Top 20 Mexico Espanol	3
US Billboard Latin Pop Albums	6
US Billboard Latin Albums	40

=== Year-end charts ===
Chart (2014)	Position
Brazilian Albums Chart	85
