= Falsa identidad season 1 =

2018 Telemundo television season

Falsa identidad
- Season 1
- Starring: Luis Ernesto Franco; Camila Sodi; Sergio Goyri; Samadhi Zendejas; Eduardo Yáñez; Sonya Smith; Alejandro Camacho
- No. of episodes: 91

Release
- Original network: Telemundo
- Original release: 11 September 2018 – 21 January 2019

Season chronology
- Next → Season 2

The first season of Falsa identidad American television series was produced by Telemundo Global Studios and directed by Conrado Martínez, Diego Muñoz, and Jorge Ríos, the series was first announced in May 2018 by Telemundo's upfront for the 2018–2019 television season. The series was first broadcast in United States on Telemundo from 11 September 2018 to 21 January 2019 with a total of 91 episodes. The video streaming service Netflix acquired the series for the distribution on worldwide.

== Cast ==
=== Main ===
- Luis Ernesto Franco as Diego Hidalgo / Emiliano Guevara
- Camila Sodi as Isabel / Camila Guevara
- Sergio Goyri as Gavino Gaona
- Samadhi Zendejas as Circe Gaona
- Eduardo Yáñez as Don Mateo
- Sonya Smith as Fernanda Orozco
- Alejandro Camacho as Augusto Orozco

=== Also main ===
- Azela Robinson as Ramona Flores
- Uriel del Toro as Joselito
- Álvaro Guerrero as Ignacio Salas
- Geraldine Bazán as Marlene
- Gabriela Roel as Felipa
- Marcus Ornellas as Porfirio Corona
- Gimena Gómez as Nuria
- Pepe Gámez as Deivid
- Vanesa Restrepo as Paloma
- Claudia Zepeda as Diana Gutiérrez
- Toño Valdes as Chucho
- Carla Giraldo as Silvia
- Juliette Pardau as Gabriela
- Martijn Kuiper as Jim
- Rebeca Manríquez as Zoraida
- Pedro Hernández as Piochas
- Alejandra Zaid as Lourdes
- Hugo Catalán as Eric
- Fernando Memije as Ramiro
- Carlos Tavera as El Topo
- Eduardo Garzón as El Pelos
- Carlos Ramírez Ruelas
- Mauricio de Montellano as Brandon
- Manuel Balbi as Eliseo Hidalgo
- Barbie Casillas as Amanda
- Checo Perezcuadra as Ricardo / Max Guevara

== Episodes ==
No. overall	No. in season	Title	Original release date	US viewers (millions)
1	1	"El desafío de Isabel y Diego"	11 September 2018	1.58
The municipal president plans a plan to hide his brother, Diego, from the narco and Isabel, from her abusive husband. They must go through a solid marriage and pretend that Ricardo is their son.
2	2	"Isabel y Diego huyen a EE.UU"	12 September 2018	1.68
To escape their misfortunes, Isabel, Diego, together with little Ricardo, cross to the United States, with new American passports. Now, they are Camila, Emiliano and Max Guevara.
3	3	"Circe traiciona a su padre"	13 September 2018	1.50
The daughter of Gavino, the cartel boss, tells Eliseo that his campaign was financed by the capo and that his stepfather is his partner. To prove it, Circe divulges where the next coca cross will be.
4	4	"Gavino amenaza a Circe"	14 September 2018	1.36
After losing his merchandise at the hands of the federals, Gavino discovers that it was Circe, who sold it to the mayor. He takes her by the neck and points her with a gun. Eliseo faces Augusto.
5	5	"Circe tiene sexo con Joselito"	17 September 2018	1.57
Circe's father expels her and she moves in with Joselito. He reminds her that if it were not for him, the capo would have killed her; so he receives a reward, after trying to procrastinate.
6	6	"Isabel hace todo por su hija"	18 September 2018	1.42
Every second Amanda spends with her father, she is in danger. Isabel starts working as a dancer in a cabaret, to get money and pay a good lawyer. Diego wants to help Isabel.
7	7	"Circe pide la cabeza de Eliseo"	19 September 2018	1.48
The daughter of Don Gavino seeks revenge on Diego. She seduces Joselito, promising him that she will please him in everything, in exchange for him killing the municipal president. Piochas and Deivid see Isabel.
8	8	"Diego se expone en televisión"	20 September 2018	1.48
Emiliano Guevara is interviewed for saving the life of a man. Eliseo is upset with his brother, because he lets himself be seen and risks everyone's life, when he is supposed to be dead.
9	9	"Isabel tiene un secreto"	21 September 2018	1.23
Isabel lies again to Diego about her work, after he claims that nobody knows her at the supermarket. He plans to unmask her. The thug Joselito corners Eliseo.
10	10	"Isabel y Diego se besan"	24 September 2018	1.55
Diego bursts out of jealousy when he sees Isabel dancing in Babel, for other men and demands that she resign. He confesses that he likes her as a woman and kisses her. Elisha knows who attacked him.
11	11	"Eliseo sospecha de Augusto"	25 September 2018	1.43
Zoraida makes a deal with Eliseo; He gives her the weapon with which he killed the prosecutor, in exchange for helping her rescue Amanda. Isabel and Diego plan to go for Amanda to Alamos.
12	12	"Isabel y Diego hacen el amor"	26 September 2018	1.46
Isabel confesses to Diego that she is falling in love with him. The two get carried away by the feelings and spend a passionate night. Eliseo faces Augusto for betraying him.
13	13	"El rescate de Amanda"	27 September 2018	1.45
The rescue of Amanda is complicated, when El Corona appears and takes Isabel by the neck, preventing her from taking her daughter. Diego faces him with blows and the three escape. Circe repents.
14	14	"Circe deja todo por Diego"	28 September 2018	1.19
After leaving Joselito planted at the altar, Circe threatens Eliseo with a weapon and demands that he take her to Diego. She is not willing to give him up. Corona files a complaint against Isabel.
15	15	"Circe mata al hermano de Diego"	1 October 2018	1.41
Eliseo dies by the bullet impact, when he tries to take the weapon from Circe. She manages and sets a trap for Gavino, to incriminate him. Diego appears at his brother's house.
16	16	"Diego sufre por su hermano"	2 October 2018	1.37
Upon learning that Gavino Gaona was the one who killed Eliseo, Diego vows to take revenge on the capo. He arrives at the funeral, to say goodbye to his brother, for the last time. Joselito receives orders to kill Circe.
17	17	"Atacan el velorio de Eliseo"	3 October 2018	1.46
The men of Gavino fulfill the order and lash out at the burial of the mayor of Alamos, to liquidate Circe and Diego. Isabel is in love. Joselito finds Circe.
18	18	"Isabel y Diego formalizan"	4 October 2018	1.36
After losing his brother, Diego confesses to Isabel that he is in love with her and wants to start a family. Corona discovers that his father killed his mother. Marlene presents her boyfriend.
19	19	"Fernanda queda en la calle"	5 October 2018	1.07
Before the dramatic situation that lives by the loss of her son and the betrayal of her husband, Fernanda is about to end her life. Joselito threatens Circe, demanding that she ask for forgiveness.
20	20	"Circe llega al Babel"	8 October 2018	1.33
After the cartel puts a price on her head, Circe and Felipa flee to Mexico City. They find refuge with Ramona, the manager of Babel. Corona withdraws the lawsuit against Isabel.
21	21	"Joselito ordena un secuestro"	9 October 2018	1.33
The cartel has no trace of Circe or Diego and believes they fled together. Joselito sends to kidnap Fernanda, since he knows that her son will return for her. Gavino receives bad news.
22	22	"Gabino al borde de la muerte"	10 October 2018	1.42
Gabino is badly wounded, after being attacked in prison, by order of his Colombian partners, who claim their debt. Joselito wants him dead. Fernanda arrives at Diego's house.
23	23	"Circe arma su propio cártel"	11 October 2018	1.30
With Augusto's money and Brandon's support, Circe plans to take the Gaona out of the way and become the most powerful cartel in the world. Isabel discovers who Marlene's boyfriend is.
24	24	"El gran momento de Circe"	12 October 2018	1.27
25	25	"Diego se arma de coraje"	12 October 2018	1.27
Circe takes the business away from the Gaona cartel and now it is she, who will pass the drug to the United States. Diego fears that she will be killed and decides to look for her. El Corona finds his son, Ricardo.
26	26	"Diego rechaza a Circe"	15 October 2018	1.45
Circe discovers that Diego loves another woman and swears she has no compassion for him. Circe wants to build her empire, only of women and asks Ramona fifteen of her girls. Corona finds Isabel and her children.
27	27	"Circe conoce a Camila"	16 October 2018	1.42
In El Babel, the new member of the group of dancers catches the attention of Circe. She asks to meet her, not knowing that Camila is Diego's wife. El Corona gets the location of its rival.
28	28	"Joselito deja vivir a Diego"	17 October 2018	1.49
To protect the people he loves, Diego decides to leave the house because the cartel could return for him and kill him. Joselito takes a picture of Isabel. Circe crosses her first shipload.
29	29	"Joselito reconoce a Camila"	18 October 2018	1.41
After seeing Camila dancing in El Babel, Joselito confirms with a photo that she is Diego's wife and demands Jim to bring her to his table. Corona and Diego fight over Isabel in the street.
30	30	"Camila le coquetea a Joselito"	19 October 2018	1.31
Joselito follows Camila's game, while the two enjoy a drink. She believes that she has everything under control and assumes that he does not recognize her. Augustus finds out who killed Eliseo.
31	31	"Circe y Joselito cara a cara"	22 October 2018	1.48
Joselito meets La Mami Chula and discovers that it is Circe. Both are threatened with death, for dominating the drug trafficking business. The dancers of Babel are in danger.
32	32	"Isabel peligra en El Babel"	23 October 2018	1.30
Joselito loses his head, after discovering that the waitresses escaped. He decides to keep Camila and her companions kidnapped, until the girls appear. Gavino is transferred to his cell.
33	33	"Diego se distancia de Isabel"	24 October 2018	1.42
Isabel asks Diego for forgiveness, for not being honest. Upset and disappointed, he wants his space to decide if they should stay together. Circe visits Gavino in jail and he attacks her.
34	34	"Circe quiere reclutar a Diego"	26 October 2018	1.14
Circe has 24 hours to cross the merchandise of the Colombians and she wants Diego as her guide, since he knows how to move through the desert. Joselito is willing to give her the location.
35	35	"Circe llega a casa de Diego"	29 October 2018	1.35
With the information that Joselito gave her, Circe confirms with her own eyes, who is the woman who stole her man. Joselito visits Gavino in jail. Deivid receives a bullet.
36	36	"Isabel y Diego se reconcilian"	30 October 2018	1.27
After the visit of Circe, Diego is sincere with Isabel and tells her the whole truth about his past and his misdeeds. They promise to start over. Marlene suspects Augusto. Joselito hatches a plan.
37	37	"Circe recibe una amenaza"	31 October 2018	1.34
The Colombians want to make sure their merchandise arrives in the United States. If Circe does not keep her promise, they will take revenge on her and Diego. Brandon wants to negotiate with Joselito.
38	38	"La trampa contra Joselito"	1 November 2018	1.36
Joselito intercepts the drug truck, where Circe and Diego carry half a ton of cocaine and is surprised. Fernanda faces Marlene. Corona receives bad news.
39	39	"Joselito manda un mensaje"	2 November 2018	1.15
For having helped Circe, Joselito seeks revenge and makes it clear to Diego, with whom he got involved. Circe seduces Diego. Corona is admitted to the hospital. Gavino receives help.
40	40	"Circe recibe un golpe duro"	5 November 2018	1.41
Felipa is in the hands of the Gaona Cartel. To rescue her, Circe arrives with her girls at Babel, at gunpoint. Joselito leaves her a little gift. Diego accepts the proposal of the Colombians.
41	41	"Isabel deja la farsa"	7 November 2018	1.24
To protect her children from the cartels, Isabel makes the decision to abandon her false marriage. La Mami Chula puts half the country against Joselito.
42	42	"La suerte está con Circe"	8 November 2018	1.25
Circe discovers that Diego is now free and she is willing to reconquer the man that drives her crazy. Gavino starts his business in prison.
43	43	"Raptan a los hijos de Isabel"	9 November 2018	1.19
Joselito does not support that Diego works with Circe and sends him to search with his men. The thugs get into Isabel's house, while her children are alone. Piochas negotiates with Circe.
44	44	"Trampa para matar a Joselito"	12 November 2018	1.22
Piochas and Don Mateo prepare the ambush to kill Joselito. Thus, they will charge the reward for his head. Isabel does not want to see Diego again. Circe does witchcraft to attract Diego's love.
45	45	"Corona más cerca de la muerte"	13 November 2018	1.34
Corona's health condition gets worse. Isabel is willing to do whatever it takes to save the father of her children. Gavino and Joselito declare war.
46	46	"Joselito va por Circe"	14 November 2018	1.27
The Gaona attack the bodegas of La Mami Chula and Joselito goes with everything, to capture her. Circe tries to escape and is shot. Diego misses Isabel. Fernanda divorces.
47	47	"La pasión de Diego"	15 November 2018	1.30
Diego manages to rescue Circe from the clutches of Joselito. He takes her to his residence and heals her wounds. Mami Chula takes the opportunity to remind him that he will always be hers.
48	48	"Isabel con el corazón roto"	16 November 2018	1.14
After the visit of the aunt of the real Emiliano Guevara, Isabel looks for Diego; When she enters his room, she gets the surprise of her life. Circe tends to trap Augusto.
49	49	"Circe mueve sus fichas"	19 November 2018	1.38
Mami Chula plans to kill two birds with one stone. She manages to get Joselito and her traitor Augusto to look for her and there she hopes to eliminate them. Diego suffers for Isabel. Marlene does not accept reality.
50	50	"La dulce venganza de Circe"	20 November 2018	1.31
Circe enjoys seeing Joselito and Augusto moored. She decides to collect each one of the debts that her enemies owe her. Don Mateo wants to take upon of a new business to have more money.
51	51	"Paloma enfrenta a Camila"	21 November 2018	1.23
Camila needs money urgently. She looks for work and is forced to tell Paloma one of her secrets. Diego feels cheated by his loved ones.
52	52	"La sorpresa de Circe y Diego"	23 November 2018	1.22
Diego is desperate to see his stepfather. He gets Circe to take him to the place where they have Joselito and Augusto. Gavino plans his release from jail.
53	53	"La otra cara de Joselito"	26 November 2018	1.38
Joselito must change his course and seek outside help to regain his power in the drug trafficking business. Circe and Diego already know where to look for him. El Babel has a new boss.
54	54	"Diego duerme con el enemigo"	27 November 2018	1.40
Augusto is in the hospital and Diego is going to eliminate him. Circe prefers to kill the man she wants, before he knows the truth about his brother. Marlene makes a decision regarding her wedding.
55	55	"Isabel al descubierto"	28 November 2018	1.37
Everything goes from bad to worse for Isabel. Margot Guevara threatens to take her to prison for using the identity of her relative. Circe has a hard time when she goes with Diego to his brother's grave.
56	56	"El nuevo plan de Diego"	29 November 2018	1.36
Circe must decide whether or not to accept the course that Diego wants to take. He wants a radical change in his life to erase his past. Isabel desperately looks for Diego.
57	57	"Diego dispuesto a dar la cara"	30 November 2018	1.21
Isabel can not run away from the city because her husband is hospitalized. Diego wants to face Margot Guevara with the truth.
58	58	"Bomba de tiempo para Isabel"	3 December 2018	1.32
Margot is about to obtain the evidence to discover the farce of Isabel and Diego. Circe's thugs look for Emiliano's aunt. Corona's medical bills are paid so that Isabel can flee.
59	59	"Circe mata por Diego"	4 December 2018	1.30
To get Diego away from Isabel, Circe looks for Emiliano Guevara's aunt and threatens her. But the situation is getting out of hand. Marlene confronts Augusto. Mateo blackmails Isabel.
60	60	"Circe queda en evidencia"	5 December 2018	1.22
Diego is sure that Circe had to do with the death of the aunt of the Guevara and faces her. She knows that Margot hindered her plans to go with him. Isabel wants to get to the truth.
61	61	"Acusan a Joselito públicamente"	6 December 2018	1.22
Augusto defends the innocence of Gavino Gaona and points to Joselito, as the true leader of the Sonora Cartel and the murderer of his stepson. Porfirio receives good news.
62	62	"Un alto precio para Circe"	7 December 2018	1.18
Circe's dream of leaving with Diego is interrupted when the Colombians give them an ultimatum. They must comply to get out of business.
63	63	"El mundo de Circe se derrumba"	10 December 2018	1.21
Circe visits his father in prison, after knowing that he can be free. She confronts him and he counterattacks, revealing the great secret of her nanny, Felipa. Porfirio is operated.
64	64	"La Mami Chula castiga a Felipa"	11 December 2018	1.29
Circe explodes with Felipa and is about to kill her, she wants her to confess if she murdered her mother to take her place. Diego shares his plan with Deivid. Corona comes out of surgery.
65	65	"Gavino prepara una sorpresa"	12 December 2018	1.41
While Circe plans to leave the business, Gavino has everything ready to defeat her. She does not imagine what is coming. Diego creates the strategy for his last crossing.
66	66	"Todos a favor de Gavino Gaona"	13 December 2018	1.35
At the trial of Gavino, Augusto testifies in his favor and releases the information, damaging the memory of his stepson, Eliseo. Isabel finds out that Diego and Circe are leaving the country.
67	67	"La gran victoria de Gavino"	14 December 2018	1.17
Gavino achieves his mission. He starts his revenge plan to liquidate each one of his enemies and corner Circe. He will not let anyone escape.
68	68	"Gavino, el más peligroso"	17 December 2018	1.25
Circe begins to feel the revenge of his father. Gavino does everything possible to leave her without exit and allies. Corona prepares a romantic night.
69	69	"Diego queda sin palabras"	18 December 2018	1.28
70	70	"Gavino golpea duro a Diego"	18 December 2018	1.28
After sitting several of his enemies at the same table, Gavino offers Diego a deal that will not leave him indifferent. Circe looks for a way to save her business and kill her father.
71	71	"El hombre amado de Circe"	19 December 2018	1.20
Circe is desperate and feels that her ever beloved Diego can be her salvation. She does not know that he is waiting for his best moment to attack.
72	72	"El encuentro de Circe y Diego"	20 December 2018	1.23
Gavino manages to sow distrust between Circe and Diego. Now both must decide what they will do to solve their situation. Augusto wants to take advantage of Diana, Marlene's sister.
73	73	"La propuesta de Diego"	21 December 2018	1.05
After giving a lot of love to Circe, Diego makes her an offer that she will not be able to fulfill. The Colombians are restless with the return of Joselito.
74	74	"La sorpresa de la Mami Chula"	26 December 2018	1.32
Circe believes she knows about Diego's activities, in whom she trusts. She calls him and he decides not to talk to her, because Isabel is at his side. Don Mateo flees to save his life.
75	75	"Isabel dispuesta a morir"	27 December 2018	1.22
Accompanied by Diego, Isabel undertakes a trip to Alamos. But they do not know that when they get there, surveillance cameras observe their movements. Circe confronts her father face to face.
76	76	"El trato del Cártel Gaona"	28 December 2018	1.27
Gavino says that soon his daughter Circe will be out of the drug trafficking business and he visits the Colombians. But not everything is as expected. Isabel and Diego work as a team.
77	77	"La pasión de Isabel y Diego"	1 January 2019	0.97
Although Diego wants to take Isabel away from his plans, she has a clear future, she will not separate from him. Gavino is impatient and wants to finish with Circe.
78	78	"Joselito ataca a Gavino"	2 January 2019	1.23
Joselito goes for Gavino at Babel and a gunshot is fired. When he is about to kill the capo, something unexpected happens that changes his destiny.
79	79	"Diego en las garras de Circe"	3 January 2019	1.19
Circe still thinks that Diego is under her control and tries to seduce him but something gets out of hand. Joselito falls into the hands of the federals and Gavino asks for his head. Jim is arrested.
80	80	"José tiene los días contados"	4 January 2019	1.17
While the federals move Joselito, they fall into an ambush. Mateo wants to show his loyalty to Gavino and promises to give him Joselito's head. Circe suspects of Diego.
81	81	"Joselito vive el infierno"	7 January 2019	1.31
The time has come for Gavino to settle accounts with Joselito, to pay for his disloyalty. Gavino makes him suffer the most and enjoys his destruction. Nuria goes through a traumatic moment.
82	82	"Circe recibe un regalo macabro"	8 January 2019	1.29
Gavino has the location of Circe and leaves her a message, so that she understands that he is in charge and who dares to challenge him, will pay with their life. Diego asks for immunity for Isabel and him.
83	83	"Diego al descubierto"	9 January 2019	1.27
While Diego organizes Circe's capture plan, she faces her biggest nightmare. Circe swears revenge against the love of her life. Williams finds Isabel.
84	84	"El plan siniestro de Circe"	10 January 2019	1.32
Diego is about to do justice for the death of his brother and deliver the guilty. But Circe has another plan in mind that changes the course of the operation.
85	85	"Diego contra Circe"	11 January 2019	1.21
After the failed capture operation, Diego and Circe take off their masks. The two tell each other their truths and anyone can lose their lives. Gavino's farce comes to light.
86	86	"La difícil decisión de Diego"	14 January 2019	1.26
With all the enemies behind, Diego has only one way out to protect Isabel and her children. But she refuses to lose him. Fernanda's restaurant is attacked. Circe seeks an ally.
87	87	"Diego en la boca del lobo"	15 January 2019	1.27
After the attack of Gavino, Diego is not going to tolerate one more aggression against the people he loves and because of that, he plans to do justice with his own hands. Mateo confabulates behind Gavino's back.
88	88	"Raptan a Isabel y a sus hijos"	16 January 2019	1.20
Isabel's worst nightmare comes true, when she and her children fall into the hands of their worst enemy. She knows that she has no escape and she pleads for the lives of her children.
89	89	"Circe acorrala a Gavino"	17 January 2019	1.27
Gavino is left without allies and falls into Mateo's trap, who delivers him to his daughter. Circe is not going to have mercy on her father, she wants to make him pay for everything he has done to her.
90	90	"El duelo final de los Gaona"	18 January 2019	1.31
The war between father and daughter reaches its climax, where only one Gaona can kill another Gaona. Isabel is on the verge of death.
91	91	"Nueva vida de Isabel y Diego"	21 January 2019	1.66
They think about a better future and without problems, Isabel and Diego are ready to enjoy as a family. But, a deranged enemy with a thirst for revenge, is lurking. Circe seeks to escape.
