= Falsa identidad season 2 =

2020 Telemundo television season

Falsa identidad
- Season 2
- Starring: Luis Ernesto Franco; Camila Sodi; Dulce María; Samadhi Zendejas; Eduardo Yáñez; Sonya Smith; Azela Robinson; Alexa Martín
- No. of episodes: 78

Release
- Original network: Telemundo
- Original release: 22 September 2020 – 25 January 2021

Season chronology
- ← Previous; Season 1

The second and final season of Falsa identidad American television series is produced by Telemundo Global Studios and directed by Conrado Martínez, Sergio Osorio, and Moisés Ortiz-Urquidi, the season was first announced in January 2019 by Telemundo. The season premiered on 22 September 2020, and concluded on 25 January 2021.

== Plot ==
In the second season, Diego and Isabel have assumed new identities under the federal witness protection program and start a new life in Nebraska. While Diego struggles to adjust to his new identity, for Isabel the change has given her self-assurance to help her family. However, an extreme situation in their lives forces their return to Mexico, and once again, they will be forced to face their enemies.

== Cast ==
An extensive cast list was published on 10 August 2020 in a press release.

- Luis Ernesto Franco as Diego Hidalgo / Oliver Dunn
- Camila Sodi as Isabel Fernández / Lisa Dunn
- Dulce María as Victoria Lamas (episodes 4–56)
- Samadhi Zendejas as Circe Gaona
- Eduardo Yáñez as Mateo Corona
- Sonya Smith as Fernanda Orozco
- Azela Robinson as Ramona
- Marco de la O as El Buitre
- Gabriela Roel as Felipa
- Álvaro Guerrero as Ignacio Salas
- Pepe Gámez as Deivid
- Uriel del Toro as Joselito
- Vanessa Acosta as Juliana Hernández
- Rubén Sanz as Father Rafael
- Gimena Gómez as Nuria
- David Palacio as El Man
- Claudia Zepeda as Diana Gutiérrez
- Abril Schreiber as Gabriela
- Toño Valdes as Chucho
- Rebeca Manríquez as Zoraida
- Pascacio López
- Ana Jimena Villanueva as Rosa
- Victor Olveira as Darwin Herfer
- Arnoldo Picazzo as Mauricio
- Latin Lover as El Mister
- Vicky Araico as Guadalupe Girón
- Sebastián Dante as El Cachorro
- Miguel Jiménez as Alberto
- Jean Paul Leroux as Alex
- Otto Sirgo as El Apá
- Barbie Casillas as Amanda / Mary Dunn
- Checo Perezcuadra as Ricardo / Jason Dunn
- Alexa Martín as Victoria Lamas (episodes 58–78)

== Episodes ==
No. overall	No. in season	Title	Original release date	US viewers (millions)
92	1	"Huir del presente"	22 September 2020	0.91
93	2	"La caída de Circe"	23 September 2020	0.79
94	3	"Todo queda atrás"	24 September 2020	0.73
95	4	"Un trato macabro"	25 September 2020	0.72
96	5	"Refugio eclesiástico"	28 September 2020	0.75
97	6	"Coincidencia incalculable"	30 September 2020	0.71
98	7	"Lealtad a prueba"	1 October 2020	0.76
99	8	"Revuelo en La Esperanza"	2 October 2020	0.66
100	9	"Reencuentro con los muertos"	5 October 2020	0.77
101	10	"Oportunidad de oro"	6 October 2020	0.79
102	11	"Los encantos de Isabel"	8 October 2020	0.60
103	12	"El refugio del Buitre"	9 October 2020	0.76
104	13	"La sangre llama"	12 October 2020	0.80
105	14	"Mateo va por más"	13 October 2020	0.76
106	15	"Provocación"	14 October 2020	0.85
107	16	"La carnada"	16 October 2020	0.79
108	17	"Asfixia"	19 October 2020	0.84
109	18	"Lágrimas de sangre"	20 October 2020	0.79
110	19	"El monstruo quiere negociar"	23 October 2020	0.81
111	20	"El huerfano de sus garras"	26 October 2020	0.75
112	21	"Juntos, pero no revueltos"	27 October 2020	0.80
113	22	"Traición imperdonable"	28 October 2020	0.81
114	23	"El Buitre come carroña"	29 October 2020	0.85
115	24	"La historia al reves"	30 October 2020	0.75
116	25	"El juramento de Amanda"	2 November 2020	0.70
117	26	"Batalla por la custodia"	4 November 2020	0.76
118	27	"La osadía"	5 November 2020	0.82
119	28	"Cara a cara en la corte"	6 November 2020	0.83
120	29	"Tambores de guerra"	9 November 2020	0.73
121	30	"A cualquier precio"	10 November 2020	0.77
122	31	"La misión"	11 November 2020	0.79
123	32	"Rumbo al más allá"	12 November 2020	0.83
124	33	"Impulsos del corazón"	13 November 2020	0.88
125	34	"Tras una pista de Salas"	16 November 2020	0.76
126	35	"Mateo saca el látigo"	17 November 2020	0.90
127	36	"Por las nalgas de Circe"	18 November 2020	0.71
128	37	"En busca del traidor"	19 November 2020	0.90
129	38	"Autodefensas en acción"	20 November 2020	0.98
130	39	"Un escondite para Fernanda"	23 November 2020	0.84
131	40	"La triple alianza secreta"	24 November 2020	0.85
132	41	"El coraje de Diego"	27 November 2020	0.87
133	42	"Encubierta"	30 November 2020	0.97
134	43	"Directo al matadero"	1 December 2020	0.87
135	44	"El siguiente golpe"	3 December 2020	N/A
136	45	"Doble rescate"	4 December 2020	0.85
137	46	"La sentencia"	7 December 2020	0.75
138	47	"La huida"	8 December 2020	0.79
139	48	"Perdón"	9 December 2020	0.88
140	49	"Rodeados"	10 December 2020	0.94
141	50	"No a la traición"	11 December 2020 (Note: This episode lasts for two hours, according to Telemundo, however it is only counted as one episode and not as two episodes.)	0.83
142	51	"Sin rastro de Salas"	14 December 2020	0.74
143	52	"72 horas"	15 December 2020	0.69
144	53	"Lavado de cerebro"	16 December 2020	0.67
145	54	"Ya se armó"	17 December 2020	0.83
146	55	"Tres por uno"	18 December 2020	0.68
147	56	"Es hora"	21 December 2020	0.79
148	57	"Las maniobras de Fernanda"	22 December 2020	0.83
149	58	"Irreconocible"	23 December 2020	0.96
150	59	"Como liebre en el bosque"	28 December 2020	N/A
151	60	"Sobre los mismos pasos"	29 December 2020	N/A
152	61	"Los demonios andan sueltos"	30 December 2020	N/A
153	62	"En carne propia"	1 January 2021	0.67
154	63	"Negocio en picada"	4 January 2021	0.81
155	64	"Tratos con la mafia"	5 January 2021	0.93
156	65	"Agallas"	6 January 2021	N/A
157	66	"Se encienden las alarmas"	7 January 2021	N/A
158	67	"La ruta hacia Victoria"	8 January 2021	0.93
159	68	"Mateo en ebullición"	11 January 2021	0.91
160	69	"Más cerca que nunca"	12 January 2021	0.89
161	70	"Van por el verdugo"	13 January 2021	0.87
162	71	"El dato"	14 January 2021	0.97
163	72	"El informante"	15 January 2021	0.97
164	73	"Todo por la familia"	18 January 2021	0.88
165	74	"Jugadas peligrosas"	19 January 2021	1.01
166	75	"El rescate"	20 January 2021	0.89
167	76	"La justicia en sus manos"	21 January 2021	0.84
168	77	"El enemigo en común"	22 January 2021	1.09
169	78	"Broche de oro"	25 January 2021	N/A
