= Alla mia età (album) =

2008 Tiziano Ferro album

Studio album by Tiziano Ferro
- Released: 7 May 2009
- Recorded: 2007–2008
- Genre: Pop; R&B; soul
- Length: 49:12; 49:14 (Spanish Edition)
- Label: EMI
- Producer: Tiziano Ferro; Michele Canova

Tiziano Ferro chronology
Nessuno è solo (2006)	Alla mia età (2009)	L'amore è una cosa semplice (2011)

Singles from Alla mia età
- 1. "Alla mia età" Released: 3 October 2008; 2. "Il regalo più grande" Released: 9 January 2009; 3. "Breathe Gentle" Released: 20 February 2009; 4. "Il sole esiste per tutti" Released: 11 September 2009; 5. "Scivoli di nuovo" Released: 27 November 2009

Professional ratings
Review scores
Source	Rating
Allmusic	4/5 stars

Alla mia età is the fourth studio album by Italian singer-songwriter Tiziano Ferro. It was released on 7 November 2009 by EMI Italiana and Capitol Records, and became Ferro's third #1 album in Italy. A Spanish-language version of the album was also released, titled A mi edad. The first single from the album was the title track "Alla mia età", which reached the top of the Italian Singles Chart.

== Album information ==
The album was recorded in Milan and London between 2007 and 2008.

Ferro included many collaborations in this project: he collaborated with Italian musician Franco Battiato in the song "Il tempo stesso", with American singer Kelly Rowland in the song "Breathe Gentle" and with Mexican singers Anahí and Dulce María from Latin pop group RBD in the song "El regalo más grande". For the album's release in Spain this last song was made into a duet with Amaia Montero. Furthermore, in an interview in Mexico Ferro declared that fellow Italian pop singer Laura Pausini co-wrote the song "La paura non-esiste" ("El miedo no existe").

== Track listing ==
No.	Title	Writer(s)	Length
1.	"La tua vita non passerà"	Tiziano Ferro	4:14
2.	"Alla mia età"	Ferro	3:33
3.	"Il sole esiste per tutti"	Ferro	4:11
4.	"Indietro"	Ferro; Ivano Fossati	3:40
5.	"Il regalo più grande"	Ferro	3:49
6.	"Il tempo stesso" (featuring Franco Battiato)	Ferro; Franco Battiato	3:05
7.	"La paura non esiste"	Ferro	3:55
8.	"La traversata dell'estate"	Ferro	3:33
9.	"Scivoli di nuovo"	Ferro; Diana Tejera	4:08
10.	"Assurdo pensare"	Ferro	4:56
11.	"Per un po' sparirò"	Ferro	3:02
12.	"Fotografie della tua assenza"	Ferro	5:23
13.	"Breathe Gentle" (Bonus track – featuring Kelly Rowland)	Ferro; Fossati; Billy Mann	3:43

== A mi edad – Track listing ==
No.	Title	Length
1.	"Tu vida no pasará"	4:14
2.	"A mi edad"	3:33
3.	"El sol existe para todos"	4:11
4.	"Breathe Gentle" (featuring Kelly Rowland)	3:43
5.	"El regalo más grande" (featuring Anahí and Dulce María of RBD (Latin America only) / Amaia Montero (Spain only))	3:48
6.	"Il Tempo stesso" (featuring Franco Battiato)	3:04
7.	"El miedo no existe"	3:55
8.	"La travesía del verano"	3:32
9.	"Deslizas otra vez"	4:07
10.	"Assurdo pensare"	4:55
11.	"Per un po' sparirò"	3:02
12.	"Fotografie della tua assenza"	5:19
13.	"El regalo más grande" (Bonus track – Solo version (Latin America only))	3:51

== Release history ==
Region	Date	Label
Italy, Switzerland	May 2009	EMI
Mexico	25 November 2008	EMI
European Union	May 2009	EMI
Spain	22 May 2009	EMI
Brazil	22 May 2009	EMI
France	10 January 2010	EMI

== Charts ==
=== Weekly charts ===
Chart (2008/2009)	Peak position
Argentine Albums (CAPIF)	2
Austrian Albums (Ö3 Austria)	40
Belgian Albums (Ultratop Wallonia)	66
German Albums (Offizielle Top 100)	97
Italian Albums (FIMI)	1
Mexican Albums (Top 100 Mexico)	75
Spanish Albums (Promusicae)	11
Swiss Albums (Schweizer Hitparade)	4

=== Year-end charts ===
Chart (2008)	Position
Italian Albums Chart	9
Swiss Albums Chart	60
Chart (2009)	Position
European Top 100 Albums	48
Italian Albums Chart	1
Swiss Albums Chart	87
Chart (2010)	Position
Italian Albums Chart	28

== Certifications and sales ==
Region	Certification	Certified units/sales
Italy	—	280,000
Italy (FIMI) since 2010	Platinum	50,000^{‡}
Switzerland (IFPI Switzerland)	Platinum	30,000^{^}
^{^} Shipments figures based on certification alone.^{‡} Sales+streaming figures based on certification alone.
