= Naty Botero =

Colombian model and singer (born 1980)

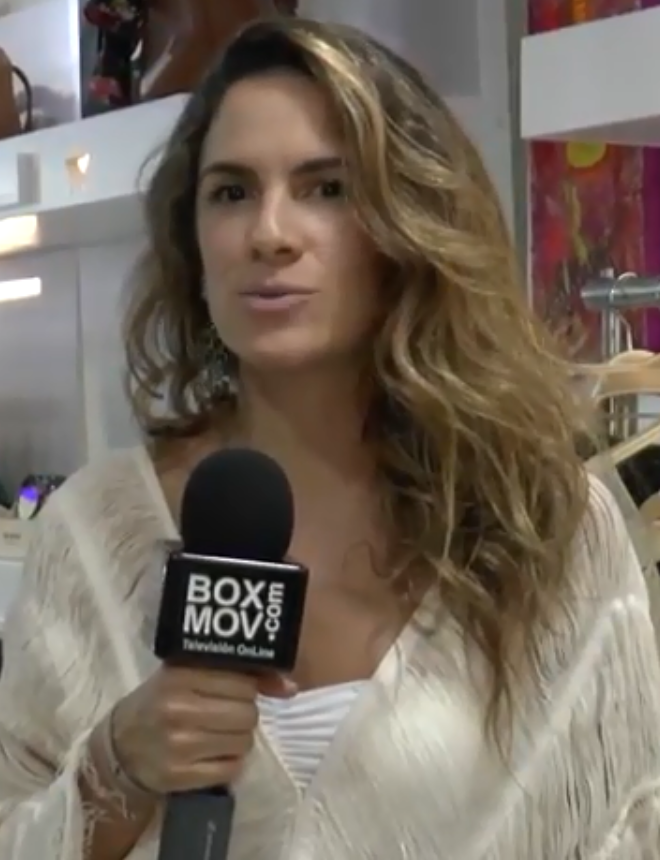
- Botero in 2016

Background information
- Born: Natalia Hernández Botero; February 10, 1980 (age 46)
- Origin: Medellín, Colombia
- Genres: Pop, latin pop, electropop
- Instrument: Vocals
- Labels: Sony Music, EMI Music
- Website: http://www.natybotero.com

Naty Botero (born Natalia Hernández Botero, February 10, 1980 in Medellín, Colombia) is a Colombian model and singer. Born in Medellín, she moved to Bogotá at a young age and stayed there through high school.

She has been recognized for her multiple nominations at the MTV EMA's, MTV Latin America Awards, Shock Music Awards and her multiple collaborations with renowned national and international artists. She currently champions the defense of indigenous communities in the Sierra Nevada de Santa Marta in Colombia, with her foundation: Coraje.

== Biography ==
=== 2006-2009: Beginnings - Naty Botero ===
Botero studied in both Paris and New York City. Her first foray into music was through Felix Da Housecat, who invited her to sing on his album Devin Dazzle & the Neón Fever, participating in five songs.

Botero presented an award at the MTV Video Music Awards Latin America in 2006 to Robbie Williams. She also participated in 2006's "La Mega: Nuestra Tierra" concert, which showcased Colombian performers.

She was nominated for the MTV Latino Awards for Best New Central Artist; she also won the Shock and Ritmo Son Latino awards in 2007. Her second promotional single, "Dinosaurio", was one of the 5 most played songs in Colombia during 2007; her third single, "Mío", was in the 10 most requested by MTV Latino and HTV. All these songs (12 in total) made up her debut album Naty Botero, which was presented live to the public on September 12, 2006.

Her first full-length album, Naty Botero, was released by Sony BMG in North America in early 2007. It contained the hit "Te Quiero Mucho". Three of Botero's other songs, "Fuego", "Dinosaurio," and "Mío" have appeared in the Colombian Top 40. In January 2007, El Tiempo chose her as that month's featured artist. "Dinosaurio" appears in one of the scenes of the movie Boy Culture. The song "Fuego" was part of the soundtrack of the American film Another Gay Movie.

=== 2010-2011: Adicta ===
In late 2009 Naty Botero released her second studio album Adicta. "Esta Noche Es Nuestra (Feat. Joe Arroyo)" was chosen as the lead single off the album. "Tu Amor Me Parte En Dos" was chosen as the second single in early 2010 and "Niño Loco" was released as the album's third single. "Niño Loco" is supported by a musical video shot in Costa Rica. More singles were released later: "Adicta (Feat. Tostao)", "Knokeada", and "Mucho Mas".

In 2011 Naty released "Amor de mis amores", a single that was included on her third album.

Parallel to her shows as a singer, Naty ventures into the DJ scene, undertaking her Naty Botero Dj Set Tour 15, with a full house in discos and clubs in Miami, Mexico, Venezuela, Ecuador (11 cities) and Colombia, mixing the best of the music of the moment and performing live special versions of her songs.

=== 2012: Manifiesto de amor ===
In 2012 she presented "Manifesto de amor", an energetic, fun and romantic song that has a video shot in the Sierra Nevada de Santa Marta in Colombia, where Naty began to develop the work of her foundation Coraje with children from indigenous communities. This song gave her a nomination for the MTV EMAs (MTV Europe) in the category of best Latin American artist alongside Juanes and also for the Shock 2012 Awards as best female soloist. This song was released as the first official single from her third album titled Coraje.

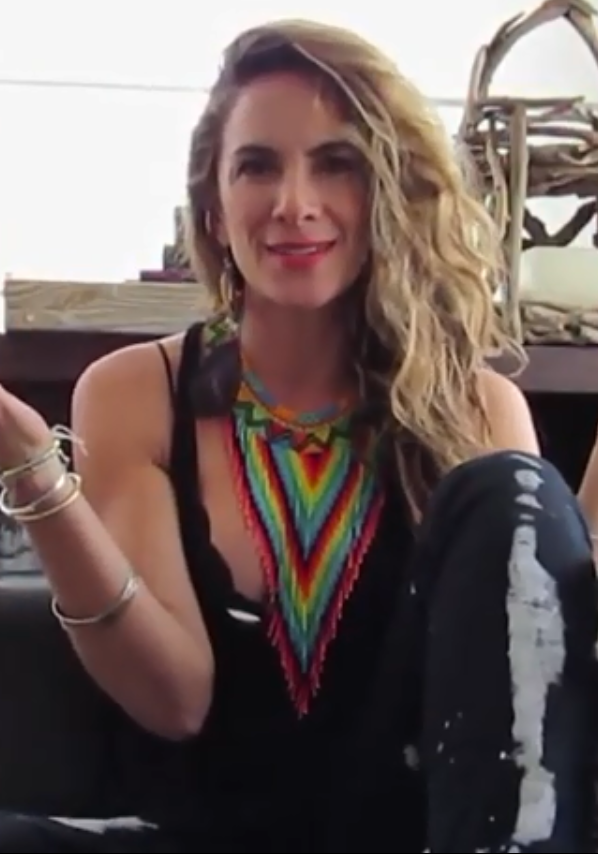
Naty Botero in 2017

=== 2013-2014: Coraje ===
In late 2013 Naty released her third album Coraje. It features her hit singles "Manifiesto de amor", "Sexo que sana (Feat. Jiggy Drama)", "Jálame el pelo", and "Femme fatale (Feat. Morenito de Fuego)". On March 15, Naty announced Coraje's fifth single "Siempre juntos (Feat. Herencia de Timbiqui)", but in July, Naty released "Rosa" as the fifth single, replacing "Siempre Juntos".

In the second half of 2014, Naty becomes a member of the jury of the TV show Baila Fanta on Canal Caracol. There she, along with great exponents of world dance such as Eddie Morales, toured various schools in Colombia in search of the best dancers in the country.

In December, the sixth single from the album is released: "Así es Vino", in collaboration with La Bermúdez, filmed in Mexico and inspired by the aesthetics of Frida Kahlo. Both artists undertake a tour of shows through various cities in Mexico and Colombia.

== 10 Years of Artistic Career and Construction of Casa Coraje ==
=== 2015-2016: Coraje By Naty Botero and Siempre Juntos ===
Naty Botero ventures into the fashion industry, presenting a few weeks before the start of the year the first Coraje collection: By Naty Botero, within the framework of Barranquilla Fashion Week. Bikinis, accessories and handmade backpacks, designed by the Colombian artist together with the women of the Sierra Nevada de Santa Marta, where Naty now lives, were presented on the catwalk. The funds from the sales of these pieces have been used to provide health care, dentistry and education to women and children in the area through the Coraje Foundation, also led by the Colombian artist.

2015 begins with the release of the seventh single from Coraje, "Siempre Juntos".

In 2016 Naty releases the next single of Coraje, the song "La Lengua" and the final single "Coraje". Other promotional videos were released: "Secrets (Feat. F3nix Castillo) and "Take You on a Plane (Feat. Savan)".

Continuing with her facet as a businesswoman, Naty builds her own hotel in Palomino from the Sierra Nevada de Santa Marta: Casa Coraje, a beach house where yoga, music and love for nature are the protagonists.

The Colombian celebrates her 10-year artistic career with a tour of acoustic shows in Mexico (Guadalajara, Mexico City, Cancun, Puebla), Honduras (San Pedro Sula, Tegucigalpa), the United States (Miami, Los Angeles and Burning Man festival in Reno Nevada) and Colombia, which ends with a concert in Bogotá in November. From the framework of the Barcú art fair, she presents the official video for "Coraje", filmed at the Burning Man festival and which works as the ninth and last single of the Coraje era, of which 9 singles and 12 videos were released, in total.

=== 2017: Guardian of the Sierra Nevada de Santa Marta ===
As her initiative, on February 10, 2017, together with the children and indigenous people of the Palomino basin in the Sierra Nevada de Santa Marta, they planted more than 1,000 trees to reforest this land. Through this activity, they sought to raise awareness, educate and continue helping to build community in this sacred place for indigenous Koguis, Arawaks and Wiwas of the mountains.

The planting was carried out in a 3-day event, coordinated to plant starting at the town of Palomino, passing through the edge of the La Guajira side, until reaching the Seivyaca educational center, an indigenous school that is reached after walking for one hour from the town of Palomino. In this town, Botero, with his Coraje Foundation, has been making donations of books and dental sessions for student children.

Naty Botero recorded her fourth studio album between the United States and Colombia.

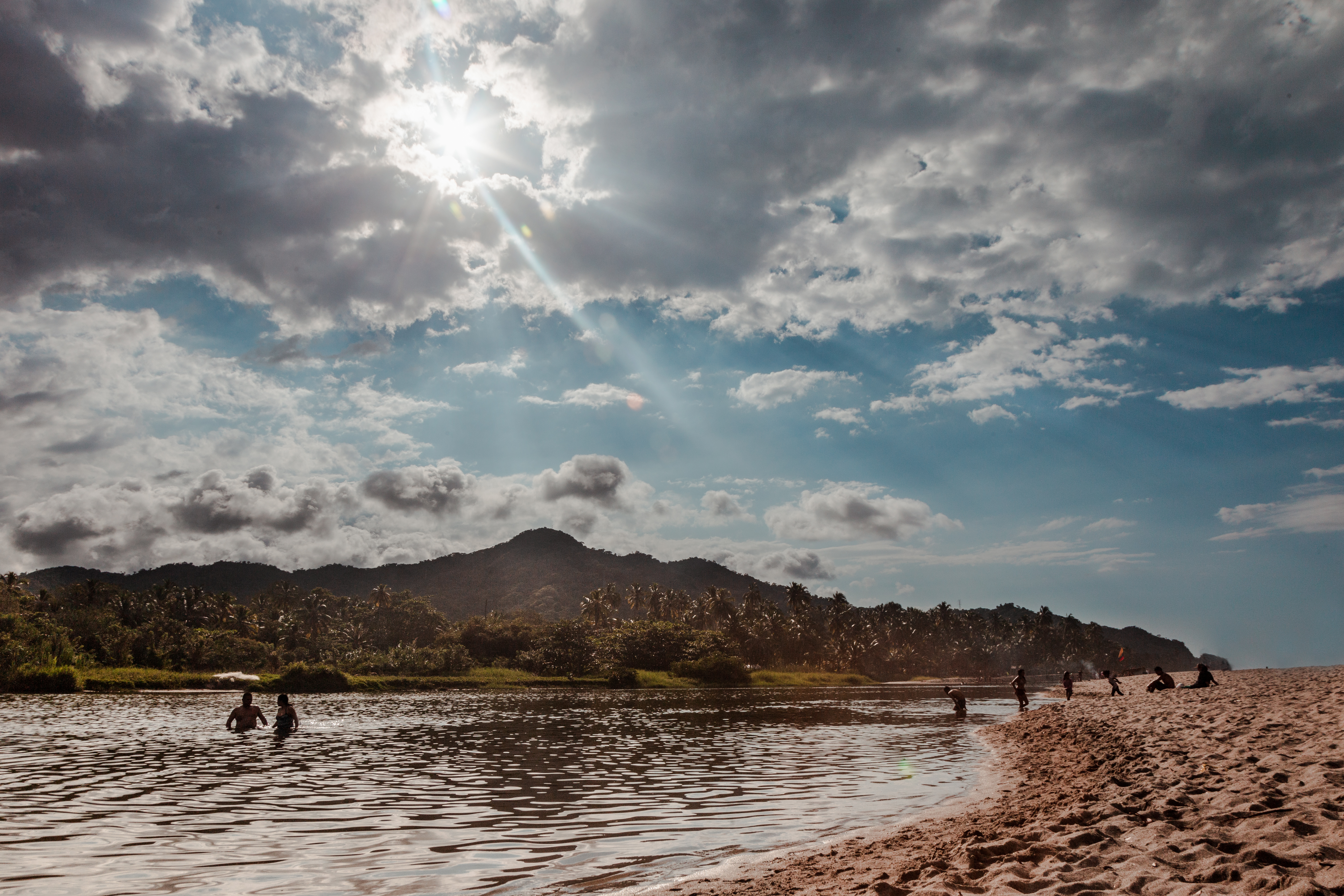
Palomino beach, Colombia. Naty Botero lives there, near the Sierra Nevada de Santa Marta, located on the shores of the Colombian Caribbean Sea.

=== 2018-2020: InDios/InLove and 20/20 Collage ===
Naty Botero's fourth album arrives in 2018, along with the first single titled "11/11", released at the end of 2017, with much more Caribbean rhythms mixed with cumbia and pop. The second single "Cucurucumbia" and part of his short film InDios are released as the first part of this double disc that contains 17 songs and was released in May 2018. "Diferente", the first phase of the album, is released at the beginning of the year as a promo single. In April, Naty launches her third official single, the song "Lloré de felicidad", together with the singer Charles King. In addition to this, the album contains the collaboration of Cata Pirata on the theme Rompe, a song that would be released as the fourth single. Other singles such as "Se va" and "Vas como río" were released during 2019.

At the end of 2019, Naty releases the song "Comelo", together with the singer Bemba Colora, a song that serves as the first single from her double album entitled 20/20 Collage: Remixes and B sides.

=== 2021-2022: Project including Tengo Fe, Puro Amor and Despedida ===
In 2021, as part of her new project, she releases the song "Tengo Fe", which was inspired by Botero's feelings, of being a strong woman but at the same time soft and sweet. The purpose of this song is to convey a message of love, leaving hate aside and changing doubt for faith. The development of this new musical work took place in Palomino, Department of La Guajira, Botero's place of residence for several years and where she lives with her family.

In 2022 and as part of the same musical project, Naty launches a new song called "Puro Amor", in which she uses Dominican merengue rhythms to express love towards her partner, but also wishing to express a feeling of self-love at that stage of her personal life and her musical career. The video for this song was also shot in the town of Palomino, on the Colombian Caribbean coast.

In July 2022, Naty released the single "Despedida", made in collaboration with Colombian singer Andrés Cabas. The video of this romantic song was filmed in the department of La Guajira and in the Sierra Nevada de Santa Marta.

== Discography ==
=== Studio albums ===
Title	Album details	Peak chart positions					
Title	Album details	U.S. Top Latin	U.S. Latin Pop	COL	MEX	ARG	SPA
Naty Botero	Released: 2006; Label: Sony Music; Formats: CD, digital download	77	49	1	7	18	95
Adicta	Released: 2009; Label: EMI Music; Formats: CD, digital download	—	—	3	—	—	—
Coraje	Released: 2013; Label: Independent; Formats: CD, digital download	-	-	2	-	-	-
InDios/InLove	Released: 2018; Label: Naty Botero Music; Formats: CD, digital download	—	—	10	—	—	—
20/20 Collage: Remixes and B sides	Released: 2020; Label: Naty Botero Music; Formats: CD, digital download	—	—	-	—	—	—

=== Other releases ===
- 2013: The Collection
- 2015: Mi Esencia
- 2021: Tengo Fe
- 2022: Puro Amor

=== Singles ===
Year	Song	Peak chart positions		Album
Year	Song	COL	MEX	Album
2006	"Te Quiero Mucho"	1	1	Naty Botero
2007	"Dinosaurio"	1	1	Naty Botero
2007	"Mio"	1	2	Naty Botero
2008	"Fuego"	-	10	Naty Botero
2009	"Esta Noche Es Nuestra"	1	1	Adicta
2010	"Tu amor me parte en dos (Versión pop) "	-	10	Adicta
2010	"Niño loco"	-	4	Adicta
2010	"Adicta"	9	1	Adicta
2011	"Knokeada"	-	1	Adicta
2012	"Mucho Mas"	-	3	Adicta
2012	"Manifiesto de Amor"	23	5	Coraje
2012	"Sexo Que Sana"	14	3	Coraje
2013	"Jálame el Pelo "	4	1	Coraje
2014	"Femme Fatale "	-	6	Coraje
2014	"Rosa "	20	1	Coraje
2014	"Vino "	-	1	Coraje
2015	"Siempre juntos "	15	1	Coraje
2016	"La lengua "	-	13	Coraje
2016	"Coraje "	-	10	Coraje
2017	"11/11"	17	9	InDios/InLove
2017	"Cucurucumbia "	-	-	InDios/InLove
2018	"Lloré de felicidad "	-	-	InDios/InLove
2018	"Rompe "	-	9	InDios/InLove
2018	"Vas como rio "	-	-	InDios/InLove
2019	"Se va "	-	-	InDios/InLove
2019	"Is this love"	-	-	InDios/InLove
2019	"Comelo"	-	-	20/20 Collage: Remixes and B sides
2020	"La lengua Remix "	-	-	20/20 Collage: Remixes and B sides
2021	"Tengo Fe"	-	-	-
2022	"Puro Amor"	-	-	-
2022	"Despedida"	-	-	-
"—" denotes releases that did not chart or were not released.

== Filmography ==
- Little Death (2003) - short film
- Por amor a Gloria (2005) - soap opera
- Another Gay Movie (2006) - movie soundtrack
- Esto huele mal (2007) - movie
- La pista (2013) - television contest
- Baila Fanta (2014) - television contest
- Barena Karaoke Nights (2016) - television contest
- InDios (2018) - short film

== See also ==
- Botero (surname). Italian surname
