= Il regalo più grande =

"Il Regalo Più Grande"

Single by Tiziano Ferro

from the album Alla mia età
- Released: January 9, 2009
- Recorded: 2008
- Studio: Abbey Road Studios; (London, United Kingdom); Kaneepa Studio; (Milan, Italy); Pinaxa Studios; (Milan, Italy)
- Genre: Pop; power ballad
- Length: 3:49
- Label: EMI
- Songwriter: Tiziano Ferro
- Producer: Michele Canova

Tiziano Ferro singles chronology
"Alla mia età" (2008)	"Il Regalo Più Grande" (2009)	"Breathe Gentle" (2009)

Anahí singles chronology
"Tu Amor Cayó del Cielo" (2001)	"El Regalo Más Grande" (2009)	"Mi Delirio" (2009)

Dulce María singles chronology
"El Regalo Más Grande" (2009)	"Beautiful" (2009)

Amaia Montero singles chronology
"Ni Puedo Ni Quiero" (2008)	"El Regalo Más Grande" (2009)	"4"" (2009)

"Il Regalo Più Grande" (English: "The Greatest Gift") is a song by Italian singer Tiziano Ferro. The song was written by Ferro for his fourth studio album, Alla Mia Età. The track was released as the album's second single on January 9, 2009.

Three different versions of the song were also recorded in Spanish under the title "El Regalo Más Grande". The first is a solo version by Ferro. The second version features Anahí and Dulce María of the Mexican pop group RBD. These two versions were included on the Latin American edition of A Mi Edad, the Spanish-language version of Alla Mia Età. This second version served as the second Spanish single from "A Mi Edad". Although the single credited Anahí and Dulce María as solo acts, the Latin American edition of "A Mi Edad" credited RBD as the guest act in the CD itself. Lastly, a third Spanish version featuring former La Oreja de Van Gogh member, Amaia Montero, was also recorded. This version was included in the edition of A Mi Edad released for Spain, and served as the official Spanish-language version of the single promoted in the country.

== Background ==
As the fifth track on Alla Mia Età, "Il Regalo Più Grande" was composed by Ferro in 2004 with the title "Il Più Grande Regalo". According to Ferro's 2010 autobiography Trent'anni e Una Chiacchierata con Papà, the songwriter revealed that the song was originally supposed to be present in the track list of his third studio album, Nessuno è solo (2006).

== Music video ==
The music video for "Il Regalo Più Grande" was filmed in New York City in December 2008, and was directed by Gaetano Morbioli. A preview of the music video was broadcast on January 22, 2009, through Italy's Fox Life TV channel. The music video for "Il Regalo Più Grande" focuses on the concept of presenting gifts to loved ones, not necessarily the type of gifts that can be bought in a store, but rather, the universe of feelings and gestures of love towards loved ones are what are referred to in the video as being "the greatest gifts". The video won the award for 'Music Video of the Year, Male Artist Category' at the 2009 Premio Videoclip Italiano awards ceremony. Among the performers in the music video is young actor Michael Rainey Jr., who, thanks to his participation in the video, was noted by Italian actor and director Silvio Muccino, who personally chose him to be one of the protagonists of his film Un Altro Mondo (2010).

A music video to promote "El Regalo Más Grande" in Latin America was also put together with footage from "Il Regalo Più Grande", but featured added scenes of Anahí and Dulce María of RBD performing the song. To promote "El Regalo Más Grande" in Spain, another version of the video was made including added scenes of Amaia Montero filmed in Madrid, and was released in May 2009.

== Track listing ==
Digital download / EP (Italy)

1. "Il Regalo Più Grande" – 3:48
2. "El Regalo Más Grande" – 3:48
3. "Il Regalo Più Grande" (Instrumental) – 3:53

Digital download (Latin America)

1. "El Regalo Más Grande" (featuring Anahí and Dulce María) – 3:49

Digital download (Spain)

1. "El Regalo Más Grande" (featuring Amaia Montero) – 3:49

== Charts and certifications ==
=== Weekly charts ===
"Il regalo più grande"
Chart (2009)	Peak position
Italy (FIMI)	2

"El regalo más grande" (with Anahí and Dulce María)
Chart (2009)	Peak position
Panama (EFE)	1

"El regalo más grande" (with Amaia Montero)
Chart (2009)	Peak position
Spain (PROMUSICAE)	11

=== Year-end charts ===
"Il regalo più grande"
Chart (2009)	Position
Italy (FIMI)	15

=== Certifications ===
Region	Certification	Certified units/sales
Italy (FIMI)	Platinum	20,000^{*}
Spain (Promusicae)	Platinum	40,000^{*}
^{*} Sales figures based on certification alone.
