= Alla mia età (song) =

Single by Tiziano Ferro

from the album Alla mia età
- B-side: "A mi edad" (Spanish version)
- Released: October 3, 2008
- Genre: Pop
- Length: 3:33
- Label: EMI
- Songwriter: Tiziano Ferro
- Producer: Michele Canova

Tiziano Ferro singles chronology
"E fuori è buio" (2007)	"Alla mia età" (2008)	"Il regalo più grande" (2009)

"Alla mia età" (English: "At My Age") is a song written and produced by Italian singer-songwriter Tiziano Ferro. It was released on 3 October 2008 as the lead single from his fourth studio album, Alla mia età.

The song is an homage to John Terry (who has the same age of Ferro) after his decisive penalty error in the 2008 UEFA Champions League final.

== Track listing ==
Digital download

1. "Alla mia età" – 3:33
2. "A mi edad" (Spanish version) – 3:33

== Charts ==
=== Peak positions ===
Chart (2008)	Peak position
ERROR in "CIS": Invalid position: 219. Expected number 1–200 or dash (–).
Europe (European Hot 100)	89
Italy (FIMI)	1
Switzerland (Schweizer Hitparade)	33

== Certifications ==
Certifications for Alla mia età
Region	Certification	Certified units/sales
Italy (FIMI)	Platinum	100,000^{‡}
^{‡} Sales+streaming figures based on certification alone.
