= Extranjera =

Extranjera (Primera Parte)

EP by Dulce María
- Released: November 9, 2010
- Recorded: 2009–2010
- Genres: Pop, dance-pop, latin pop
- Length: 24:07
- Label: Universal Music Latino
- Producers: Carlos Lara, Pedro Damián, AXL, Dulce María, Sebastian Krys

Dulce María chronology
RBD discography (2004-2009)	Extranjera (Primera Parte) (2010)	Extranjera (Segunda Parte) (2011)

Singles from Extranjera
- 1. "Inevitable" Released: May 11, 2010

Extranjera (Segunda Parte)

Studio album by Dulce María
- Released: June 14, 2011
- Recorded: 2009-2010
- Genres: Pop, dance-pop
- Length: 49:01
- Label: Universal Music Latino
- Producers: Carlos Lara, Pedro Damián, AXL, Dulce María, Sebastian Krys

Dulce María chronology
Extranjera (Primera Parte) (2010)	Extranjera (Segunda Parte) (2011)	Sin Fronteras (2014)

Singles from Extranjera
- 1. "Ya No" Released: November 23, 2010; 2. "Ingenua" Released: June 20, 2011

Extranjera ("Foreigner") is the debut solo album by Mexican singer and songwriter Dulce María. Extranjera was divided into two EPs, starting with an EP Extranjera (Primera Parte), containing seven songs, released on November 9, 2010. and the album Extranjera (Segunda Parte) released on June 14, 2011, with 7 more tracks plus a DVD with extras. The first single off the EP and album was "Inevitable".

== Singles ==
"Inevitable" was released as the lead single from the album released on May 11, 2010. The music video for the song premiered on May 24, 2010.

"Ya No" was chosen as the second single off Extranjera, and was released to radios on November 16, 2010. "Ya No" is a cover from the late singer Selena off her Amor Prohibido album. Due to piracy issues the music video for "Ya No" was released on February 10, 2011. .

"Ingenua" was released as the album's third single.

== Track listing ==
Primera Parte
No.	Title	Writer(s)	Producer(s)	Length
1.	"Inevitable"	Dulce María, Axel Dupeyron, Andrea Hernández	AXL	3:10
2.	"Luna"	Dulce María, Axel Dupeyron, Andrea Hernández	AXL	2:50
3.	"No Se Parece"	Carlos Lara, Ximena Muñoz	Carlos Lara	4:02
4.	"Vacaciones"	Alih Jay, Baltazar Hinojosa	Sebastian Krys	3:00
5.	"Ingenua"	Pedro Dabdoub Sanchéz, Monica Velez	Mario I. Contreras	3:28
6.	"El Hechizo"	Xabier San Martín Beldarrain	Carlos Lara	3:56
7.	"Extranjera"	Pedro Dabdoub Sanchéz, Monica Velez	Sebastian Krys	3:44

U.S. Version
No.	Title	Writer(s)	Producer(s)	Length
1.	"Inevitable"	Dulce María, Axel Dupeyron, Andrea Hernández	AXL	3:08
2.	"Luna"	Dulce María	Dulce María, Axel Dupeyron, Andrea Hernández	2:49
3.	"No Se Parece"	Carlos Lara, Ximena Muñoz	Carlos Lara	4:02
4.	"Vacaciones"	Alih Jay, Baltazar Hinojosa	Sebastian Krys	3:00
5.	"Extranjera"	Pedro Dabdoub Sanchéz, Monica Velez	Sebastian Krys	3:45
6.	"Inevitable (Superheroes Remix)"	Dulce María, Axel Dupeyron, Andrea Hernández, J-King y Maximan	AXL, J-King y Maximan	3:15

Segunda Parte
No.	Title	Writer(s)	Producer(s)	Length
1.	"Inevitable"	Dulce María, Axel Dupeyron, Andrea Hernández	AXL	3:08
2.	"Irremediablemente"	Dulce Maria		3:07
3.	"Ya No"	A.B. Quintanilla, Ricky Vela	A.B. Quintanilla	3:24
4.	"Ingenua"	Pedro Dabdoub Sanchéz, Monica Velez	Mario I. Contreras	3:22
5.	"Lo Intentaré"	Dulce Maria		3:12
6.	"No Se Parece"	Carlos Lara, Ximena Muñoz	Carlos Lara	4:02
7.	"Vacaciones"	Alih Jay, Baltazar Hinojosa	Sebastian Krys	2:58
8.	"Luna"	Dulce María, Axel Dupeyron, Andrea Hernández	AXL	2:47
9.	"Extranjera"	Pedro Dabdoub Sanchéz, Monica Velez	Sebastian Krys	3:42
10.	"Dicen"	Dulce María		2:41
11.	"Pensando En Ti"	Dulce María		3:38
12.	"El Hechizo"	Xabier San Martín Beldarrain	Carlos Lara	3:51
13.	"24/7"	Dulce Maria		3:15
14.	"Quien Serás? (Live From El Lunario Mexico / 2010)"	Dulce María, Baltazar Hinojosa		3:39

Brazilian bonus tracks
No.	Title	Length
15.	"Extranjera Portuguese Version"	3:41
16.	"Ingenua Portuguese Version"	3:24

== Promotion ==
Extranjera On Tour
- Continental tour by Dulce María
- Location: South America • North America
- Associated album: Extranjera
- Start date: April 15, 2011
- End date: September 23, 2011
- Legs: 1
- No. of shows: 12 in North America; 8 in South America; 20 Total

Extranjera On Tour was the tour staged in support of the album. The tour began in Puebla, Mexico on April 15, 2011 and wrapped up in Caracas, Venezuela on September 23, 2011.

== Charts and certifications ==
Chart	Peak position
First Part
Argentine Weekly Pop	7
Brazil Top 10 Albums	6
Croatian International Albums Chart	6
Mexican Albums (AMPROFON)	1
Mexican Pop Albums Chart	8
Polish Albums Chart (monthly)	79
Spanish Albums Chart	9
US Top Latin Albums	66
US Latin Pop Albums	11
Second Part
Argentine Weekly Pop	16
Mexican Albums Chart	29
Spanish Albums Chart	24
US Latin Pop Albums	20

=== Year-end charts ===
Chart (2011)	Position
Brazilian Albums Chart	43

=== Certifications and sales ===
Region	Certification	Certified units/sales
Brazil (Pro-Música Brasil)	Gold	20,000^{*}
^{*} Sales figures based on certification alone.
