= Dulce María =

Mexican singer and actress (born 1985)

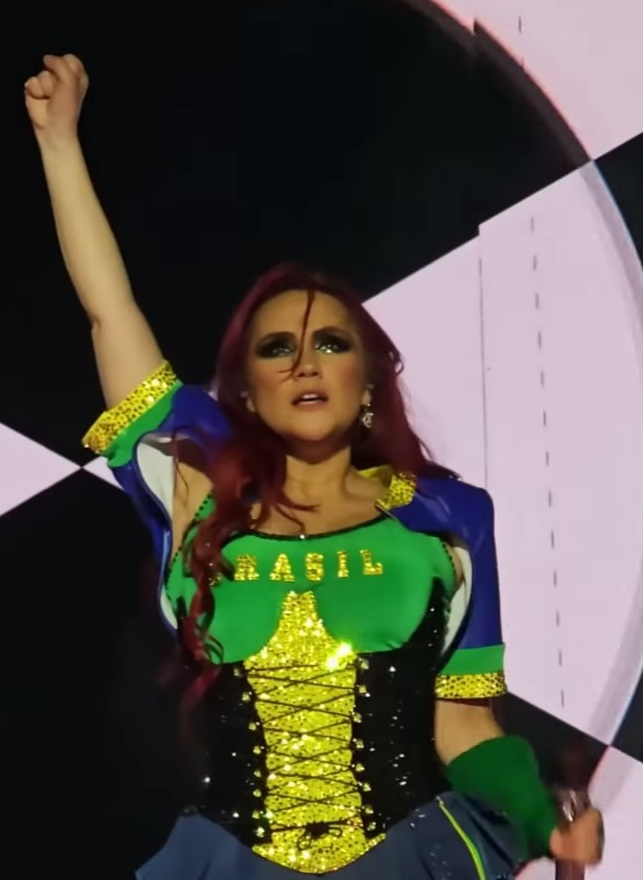
- Dulce María in 2023
- Born: Dulce María Espinosa Saviñon; 6 December 1985 (age 40); Mexico City, Mexico
- Occupations: Singer; actress; songwriter; author
- Years active: 1990–present
- Spouse: Paco Álvarez (m. 2019)
- Children: 2
- Musical career
- Genres: Latin pop; ballad
- Instruments: Vocals; guitar
- Labels: Fonovisa (1996-2000); BMG (2001–02); Capitol (2004–09); Universal Latin (2009–present)
- Formerly of: KIDS; Jeans; RBD

Dulce María Espinosa Saviñón (Spanish: [ˈdulse maˈɾi.a saβiˈɲon], born 6 December 1985), simply known as Dulce María, is a Mexican singer and actress.

Dulce María began her career at age 5, participating in more than 100 TV commercials. At the age of eleven, she was part of musical group, KIDS. Then, at the age of fifteen, she joined another group, Jeans. She also starred in many successful telenovelas, including El vuelo del águila (1994), Nunca te olvidaré (1999), Primer amor, a mil por hora (2000), Clase 406 (2002), Rebelde (2004), Verano de amor (2009), Corazón que miente (2016), Muy padres, (2017) ans Pienso en ti (2023)

Dulce María reached international success in 2004 after starring in Televisa's telenovela Rebelde and being part of the twice grammy-nominated group RBD, who sold over 15 million records worldwide.

Since 2009, Dulce María has worked in her solo musical career, after signing to Universal Music Latin, her extended play Extranjera - Primera Parte (2010) debuted at number one on Mexico's Asociación Mexicana de Productores de Fonogramas y Videogramas chart and became the first Mexican artist to certified a platinum award in Brazil. Dulce María has released four solo albums: Extranjera - Segunda Parte (2011), Sin Fronteras (2014), DM (2017), and Origen (2021).

Dulce María has won various international accolades, including the MTV Europe Music Awards, Premios TVyNovelas, People en Español Awards, Premios Juventud, and the American, Mexican, and Brazilian editions of the Nickelodeon Kids' Choice Awards. She has been featured on the "most beautiful" lists of publications such as People en Español and Quién, and has been recognized as one of the most influential Mexican figures on Twitter.

== Early life ==
Dulce María was born on 6 December 1985 in Mexico City. She has two sisters, Blanca Ireri and Claudia. She has German, Native Mexican, and Spanish ancestry and is the third cousin of painter Frida Kahlo. She stated in an interview with Go Pride that "my grandmother is her cousin."

As a child, Dulce María began doing television commercials. In 1993, at the age of 8, she was cast in Plaza Sesamo, Mexico's version of Sesame Street and appeared in both live action and as animated in the show's live action/animated opening credits which was produced by Oscar González Loyo. She also appeared in various Mexican commercials during her young age, including the Mexican furniture store Viana during Mother's Day. She was later cast in El Club de Gaby and participated in several specials on the Mexican Discovery Kids channel. She began to work in soap operas in Televisa.

== Music career ==
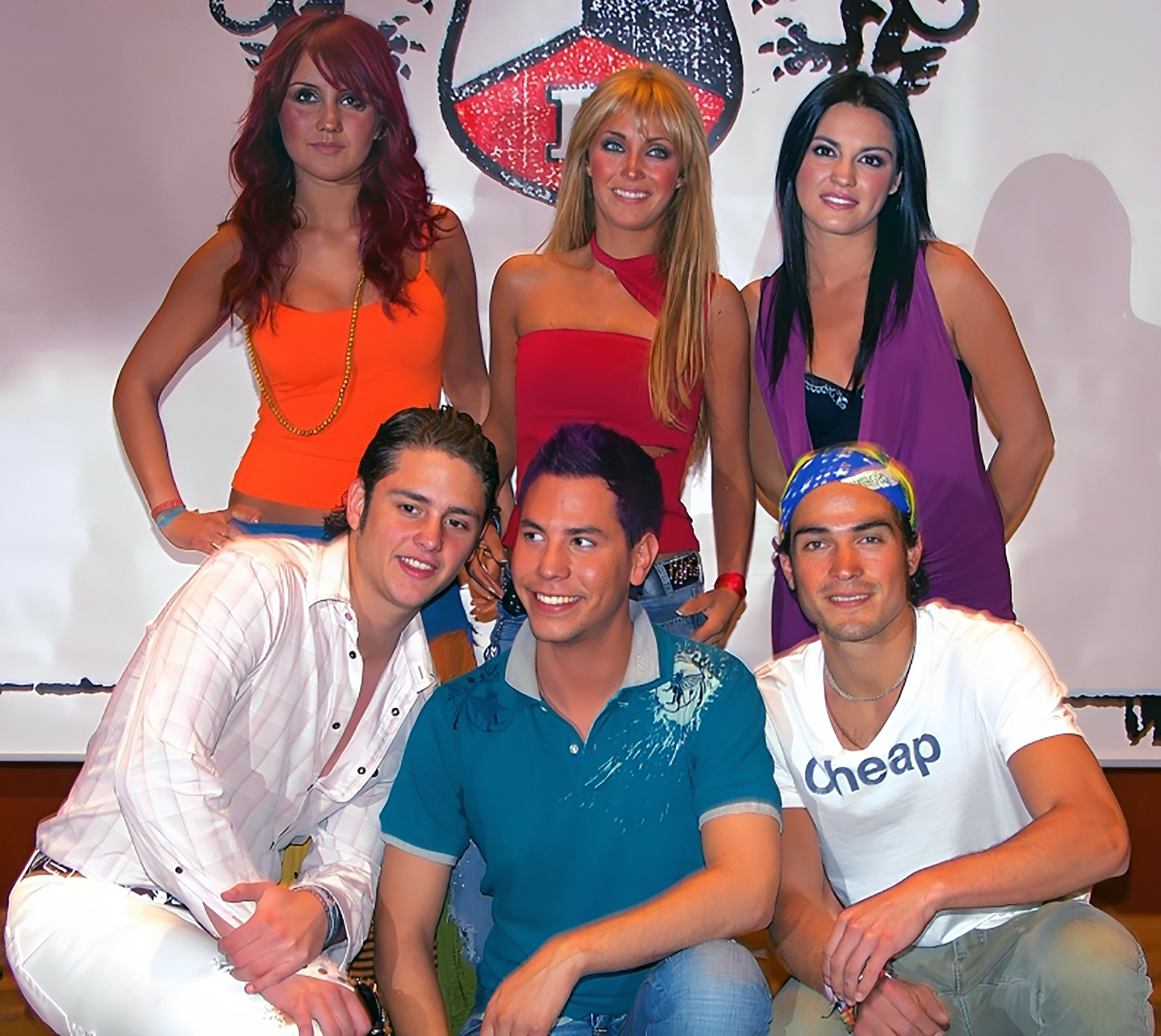
Dulce María as RBD singer in a press conference in Brazil.

In 1996, Dulce joined the Mexican music group KIDS. They were very popular among children in Mexico. In 1999, Dulce decided to leave the group for personal reasons. After her departure from KIDS, Dulce and her then boyfriend, Daniel Habif, also a member of KIDS, decided to start their own group called D&D. They recorded five songs but, for unknown reasons, split up. In early 2000, Dulce replaced Angie in Jeans, a female Latin pop group. She left the group after two years due to landing the main role of Marcela Mejía in the 2002 telenovela, Clase 406 which starred the Mexican singer and actress. Other members from RBD also starred in the telenovela before the group launched in 2004.

Dulce begin acting in movies and was eventually cast as one of the main characters in Rebelde. The success of Rebelde launched RBD made up of Dulce, Maite Perroni, Christian Chávez, Alfonso Herrera, Anahí, and Christopher von Uckermann. The group made 9 studio albums, including records in Spanish, Portuguese and English. To date, they have sold over 20 million albums worldwide, and toured across Mexico, South America, Serbia, Romania, the United States, and Spain. On 15 August 2008, RBD released a message telling fans that they had decided to split up. They went on one final tour, Gira del Adiós World Tour which ended in 2008. On 25 November 2008, Dulce collaborated with Tiziano Ferro and Anahí on a song called El regalo màs grande. Following the breakup of RBD, Dulce signed with Universal Music and announced that she began recording in 2009 as a solo artist.

=== Solo projects ===
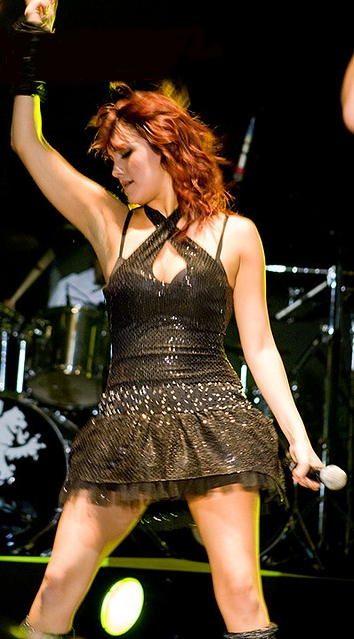
Dulce María performing in 2008

In 2009, she recorded two new songs for the novela, Verano de amor, called "Verano" and "Déjame Ser", a song she co-wrote along with Carlos Lara. Dulce also collaborated with Akon, to remix his song "Beautiful". They performed the song together at the 2009 radio concert, El Evento 40.

Dulce María released her first solo single on 17 May 2010, titled "Inevitable". The music video was released on 24 May and was directed by Argentinean director Francisco d'Amorim Lima. Dulce María's solo album Extranjera was originally set to be released on 7 September, but the release date was changed due to the recording of some new tracks. The album was then set to be released 9 November 2010, with her stating on Twitter, "We have more surprises for you guys so be patient!". The surprise was that the album was going to be divided in two: Extranjera Primera Parte, with 7 tracks, including the hit "Inevitable", released on 9 November 2010 and Extranjera Segunda Parte with 7 more tracks plus a DVD with extras. On 9 November 2010, Dulce María presented her album with a showcase at the Lunario and announced her second single "Ya No", which will be featured on the second part of the album set to be released in the summer of 2011. The song is a cover of the late singer Selena from the album Amor Prohibido. The song began playing on radios on 16 November 2010.

On 14 January 2011, a preview clip was released for Dulce's new single "Ya No" showing her in 3 different outfits, and in the last scene arguing with her love interest. Dulce María's music video for "Ya No" was released on 10 February on her personal YouTube channel, DulceMariaLive, earlier than planned due to it being leaked. Dulce María announced on her official YouTube account that Extranjera Segunda Parte would be released on 14 June 2011.

In 2016, Dulce began recording her third studio album titled "DM". The record was finished in August 2016, and was released on 10 March 2017. In 2017 she started DM World Tour promoting the album, where she performed in countries as Mexico, Brazil and Spain.

In 2018, she announced that she is preparing a new album that will be called Origen, who will only have songs that she composed. She announced a concert at the Teatro Metropólitan in Mexico City to present part of these songs, the album is expected to launch in 2019.

== Acting career ==
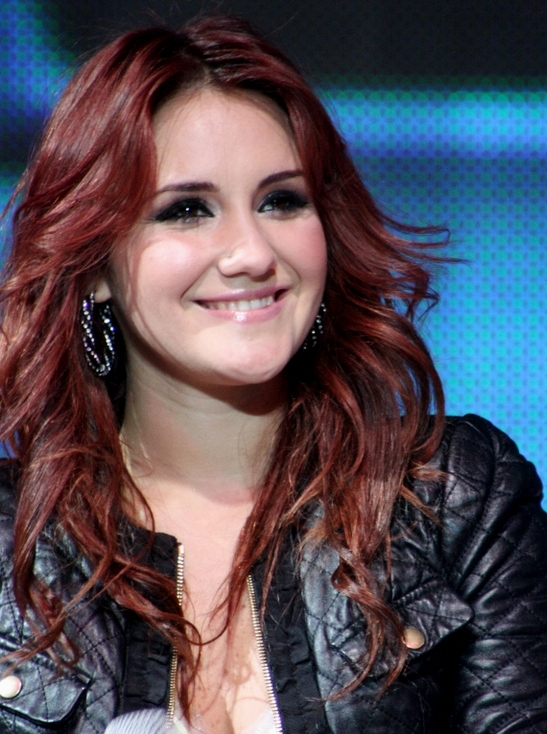
Dulce María at Teleton 2011 in Mexico City.

Following her success as a child star, Dulce began to star in teen-oriented telenovelas such as El Juego de la Vida and Clase 406. In Clase 406, she worked alongside Alfonso Herrera, Anahí, and Christian Chávez, who later became her bandmates in RBD. In 2004, she was cast as one of the main characters in Rebelde, a Mexican remake of the hit Argentinian telenovela, Rebelde Way. Dulce played Roberta Pardo, the strong-willed daughter of a famous Mexican singer. Rebelde was a hit worldwide and had over 400 episodes, airing from 2004 until 2006. In 2006, the actress received the TV Y Novelas award for Best Young Telenovela Actress for her work in Rebelde.

Following the success of Rebelde in 2007, Televisa released RBD: La familia, which starred the members of RBD. The sitcom was based on the fictional lives of the members of RBD. The characters of the sitcom were not based on the band's characters in Rebelde, but intended to be similar to the actors' real personalities. RBD: La Familia was the first Mexican series shot entirely in High Definition. The show ran from 14 March 2007 – 13 June 2007 and only had 13 episodes.

In 2009, Dulce starred in the telenovela Verano de amor, alongside Gonzalo Garcia Vivanco and Ari Borovoy, also produced by Pedro Damián, where she interpreted the theme songs of the telenovela, Verano and Déjame Ser; Dulce was cast as Miranda. The telenovela premiered on 9 February 2009, replacing the series Juro Que Te Amo. Verano de amor incorporated messages into the novela promoting environmental responsibility, an extension of Televisa's "Televisa Verde" initiative focused on the environment.

In 2010 she received the prize of People en Español as Best Young Actress for the telenovela Verano de amor.

In April 2010 Dulce Maria was cast as a Lupita in a new independent film project, directed by Gonzalo Justiniano, "Alguien Ha Visto A Lupita?" (Has Anyone Seen Lupita?) starring alongside Chilean actor Cristián de la Fuente. The film was released in March 2011. Dulce Maria was in fashion line Cklass with her ex colleague Maite Perroni. Dulce was in TV show Clase 406 with actors Anahi, Alfonso Herrera, and Christian Chavez. The two latter of the three were also in a group with Dulce which was also named Clase 406.

In 2013, Dulce starred in a return to the telenovela in Mentir para Vivir.

In 2015, she appeared in a PETA video discouraging people from attending circuses that use animals.

In 2016, Dulce starred as the first antagonist role debut in the telenovela Corazón que miente.

In 2018, Dulce starred in the telenovela Muy padres.

In July 2018, Dulce Maria joined the PETA campaign against SeaWorld.

== Philanthropy ==
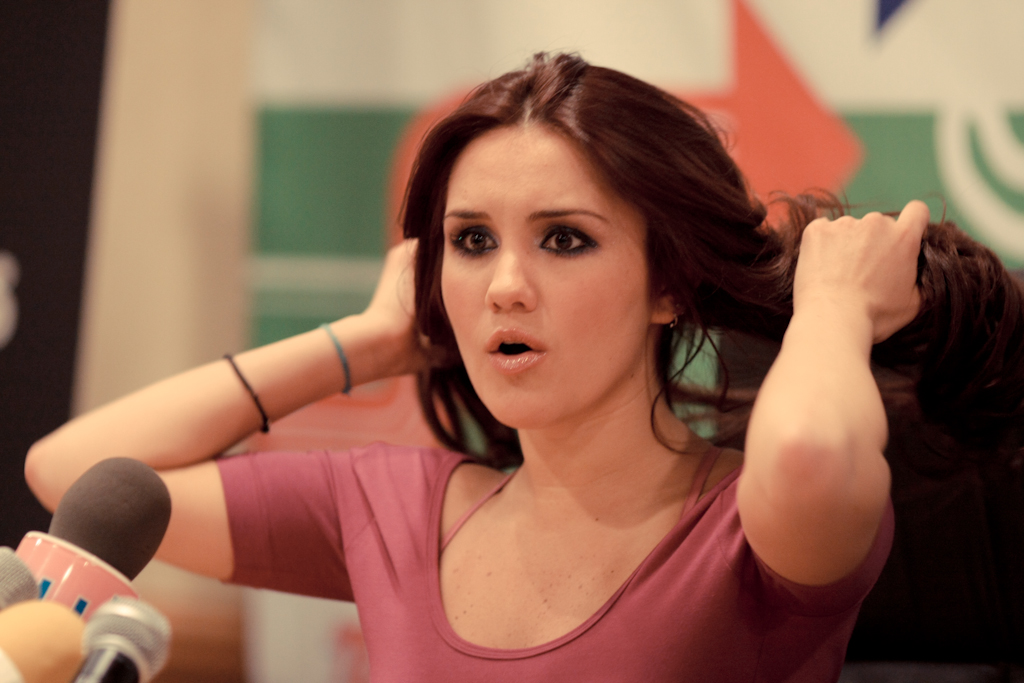
Mexican singer Dulce Maria at the 2010 Expo Joven in Chihuahua, Mexico.

Throughout her career, Dulce María has been participating in several humanitarian campaigns. In September 2009 she was chosen by Google, Save the Children and Chicos.net as the representative of the campaign Technology Yes that is responsible for promoting the good use of the internet among young people. In October Dulce created her own foundation called Fundación Dulce Amanecer with the objective of contributing to social causes, ranging from supporting the communities of support of indigenous women to caring for the environment, the singer maintains the foundation with the support of his followers around the world and donations and sweepstakes of her personal items. On account of its foundation, in 2011 Nickelodeon Latin America announced that Dulce María would receive the Pro Social Award of the Kids Choice Awards Mexico 2011. Dulce received the green blimp, a special award that distinguishes those who receive this recognition. The Social Pro Award is presented in other countries as the United States and Brazil under the Big Green Help strategy, established by Nickelodeon. This recognition is given to people who stand out for their actions and impact on the environment or society, such as Michelle Obama in 2010.

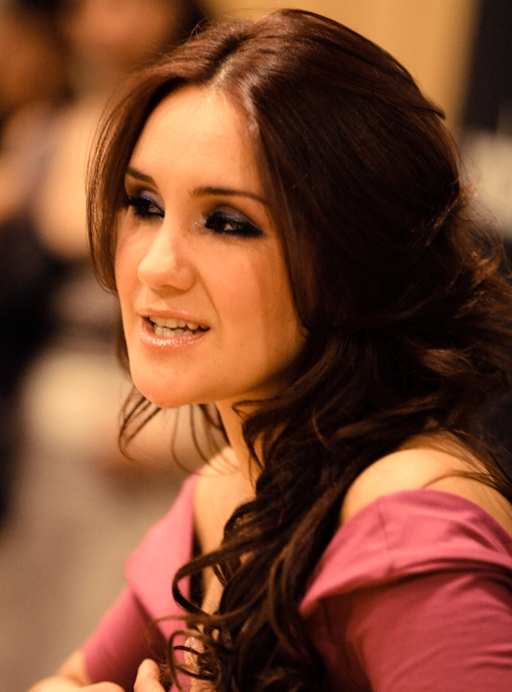
Dulce María at Expo Joven 2010 in Chihuahua, Mexico.

In February 2010, Dulce María along with Alfonso Herrera were presented to the media at the Auditorio Nacional of Mexico City as representatives of Expo Joven 2010, an event that aimed to demonstrate against the violence and insecurity that plagues Mexico, especially in Chihuahua. On 20 February, Dulce went to the Chihuahua City as part of Expo Joven, where she gave a lecture on the theme "friendship."

In August 2012, Dulce María helped build and open a playground located in Lynwood, California, at the invitation of KaBOOM! and Kool-Aid who sponsored this space designed to promote physical activity among minors and reduce obesity levels in this sector of the population. Dulce carried out activities that varied from painting the place, mixing cement, cutting the ribbon of the inauguration and besides taking pictures with the Hispanic families and volunteers that participated in the event. In October, Dulce was the representative of the campaign Mujeres a Tiempo organized by Televisa Monterrey, a campaign that fights against breast cancer. So committed to this cause, Dulce composed and recorded a theme, Reloj de arena, to be the campaign anthem, in addition to having recorded a video for the theme in several places of Monterrey accompanied by women who are part of Mexican associations like Mexican Red Cross, Unidas Contigo and Supera. Dulce was photographed by director and producer Pedro Torres for the Mexican magazine Quién, as part of the campaign Tócate – Por un México sin cáncer de mama, a campaign where 28 women who participate together to give voice and create health awareness and early detection of breast cancer, and aims to provide funding for the Fundación del Cáncer de Mama (FUCAM). With the images of the 28 women who participated, a gallery was made that remained on display during October on Paseo de la Reforma, Mexico City. In December during the end-of-year party period, Dulce visited with her sister, Blanca, a hospital that cares for children with Cancer in Mexico. During her visit Dulce delivered toys and talked with the children.

In September 2013, Dulce, along with artists like Lucero and Reik recorded ¡Súmate Ya!, the official theme of the campaign to gather support for those affected by Hurricane Ingrid and Hurricane Manuel. In November, Dulce became the image of MTV's global campaign Someone Like Me, along with SICO, a global campaign to inform and create conversation among young people about sex, sexual health, and ultimately reach an HIV-free generation. Dulce participated in an event in Mexico, with the participation of DJ Benjamin Diamond, to talk about the theme. In December, Dulce joins the Televisa Foundation campaign, "Live the Dream," an initiative for English-language learner in public schools in the United States. On 9 December, she visited "Burbank Middle School" located in the city of Houston, Texas. Through this campaign, she told of her experiences of overcoming to inspire students to define their goals and how to work to overcome them.

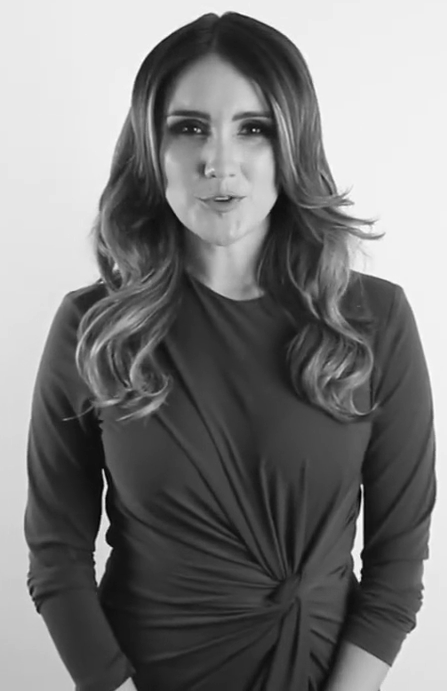
Dulce during the campaign "Vive con Glamour" in October 2016.

In March 2015, Dulce joined the People for the Ethical Treatment of Animals (PETA), to condemn the abuse of elephants in circuses in the United States. In an interview with the agency AP, the singer said her interest in protecting elephants came during a trip to Thailand in 2014. In the video she filmed for the campaign, she asks people not to go to the circuses that use animals and explains in detail all the ill-treatment to which elephants are subjected so that they may perform their function. Dulce also applauds the fact that Mexico has already banned the use of wild animals in circuses. In June, during her visit to Chile for her tour, Dulce visited the Corporación de Ayuda al Niño Quemado (COANIQUEM), appearing captivated by the cause, actively sharing with the children attended at the foundation. In November, on the International Day for the Elimination of Violence against Women, Dulce joined the #NiUnaMás campaign that seeks to sensitize all Mexicans to the problem of gender violence. Through her Twitter account, she published an image of you with the message: "#DiNoALaViolencia #LaViolenciaDestruye". Like her, other personalities have joined this campaign which was launched by Fundación Origen through its website where men and women are invited to take a photo and then share in their networks and create a greater impact.

In January 2016, Dulce María joins the #LeerMx – Lo Que Importa Esta En Tu Cabeza, organized by the Mexico Communication Council, the concept of the campaign means to the youth beyond their appearance, what really matters is what is in their head and, in this sense, reading is the tool that gives them more, that is, through it they can express themselves, create, participate and build their own personality. In October, Dulce once again joins a campaign against Breast Cancer. Now as ambassador of the fourth edition of the campaign Vive con Glamour by Glamour magazine. It is an initiative held every year during the National Breast Cancer Awareness Month which aims to have women perform self-examination.

On 23 February 2017, Dulce María joined the ambassador, along with Juan Pablo Manzanero and singer Kalimba, to the campaign of the Christian aid organization World Vision International, which helps to change the reality of Latin American children subjected to abuse and violence in all its forms. During the press conference, Dulce emphasized that it is time to join efforts to give a message throughout Mexico and the rest of Latin America, as well as other parts of the world to reinforce what the organization does for children. Dulce along with singers like Cristian Castro and Kalimba released the song Da Amor as official song of World Vision.

=== Personal life ===
In 2007, as well as in 2010, 2011, 2016, and 2017, the magazine People en Español named her one of "50 Most Beautiful".

In September 2009, the singer was chosen by Google, Save the Children and Chicos.net as a representative of the Technology Yes campaign aimed at promoting the appropriate use of technology and the Internet among children and youth.

Dulce María dated Daniel Habif, her bandmate in KIDS, for five years, from 1997 until 2002. She met Alfonso Herrera in 2002 while they were shooting the telenovela Clase 406, and they were in a relationship until April 2005. From late 2005 to April 2006, she dated Mexican goalkeeper Guillermo Ochoa. In 2008, Dulce started dating actor Pablo Lyle, while they were shooting Verano de Amor, but they broke up one year later. From 2011 to 2015, she was in a relationship with Luis Rodrigo Reyes. On 9 November 2019, she married Mexican producer, Paco Álvarez, in a small ceremony in Jojutla, Mexico, after three years of dating. On 8 June 2020, Dulce María announced via her Instagram that she and Álvarez were expecting their first child. Their daughter María Paula was born on November 27, 2020. On October 27, 2025, she announced her second pregnancy. Her second daughter, Fernanda, was born in late March 2026.

== Filmography ==
=== Films ===
Year	Title	Role	Notes
1994	Quimera	Lucía	Short film
1998	Desilusiones	Nina	Short film
1999	Inesperado amor	Lorena	
2000	Bienvenida al clan	Aleshaí	
2000	Juguito de Ciruela	Julieta Luna	Short film
2009	El agente 00-P2	Molly Cocatu	
2012	Have You Seen Lupita?	María Guadalupe "Lupita" Concepción	
2014	Quiero ser fiel	Karla Martín	
2020	Más Allá de La Herencia	Gabriela	
2022	Valentino, Be Your Own Hero Or Villain	Carmen	

=== Television ===
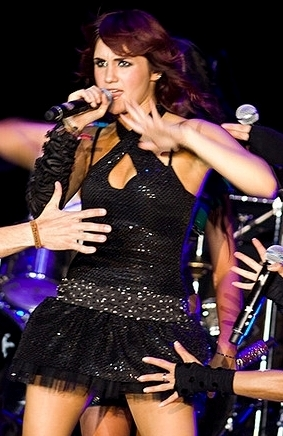
Dulce María en 2008.

Year	Title	Role	Notes
1993	Súper Ondas Club Amigos de Fanta	Girl	
1993–1995	Plaza Sésamo	Girl	
1993	El club de Gaby	Girl	
1993	École	Girl	
1994	El vuelo del águila	Delfina Ortega de Díaz	Episodes 4–5
1995	Alondra	Child in the church	Episodes 3–4
1995	Retrato de Familia	Elvira Preciado Mariscal	Episodes 1–2
1996	Canción de amor	Unknown character	
1997	Mujer, Casos de la Vida Real	Unknown character	Episode "Ver Para Creer"
1997	No tengo madre	Tina Tomassi	
1997	Huracán	Rocío	
1999	Nunca te olvidaré	Silvia Requena Ortiz	Episodes 1–6
1999	Infierno en el paraíso	Dariana Valdivia	
1999	Mujer, Casos de la Vida Real	Diana	Episode "Niño Problema"
1999	DKDA: Sueños de juventud	Mary Cejitas	
2000	Mi Destino Eres Tú	Nuria del Encino de Rivadeneira	
2000	Primer amor, a mil por hora	Brittany	Episodes 91–98
2002	El juego de la vida	Marcela Mejía	Episode 165
2002–2003	Clase 406	Marcela Mejía	Lead role
2004–2006	Rebelde	Roberta Alejandra María Pardo Rey	Lead role
2007	RBD: La familia	Dul	Lead role; 13 episodes
2007	Lola: Once Upon a Time	Herself	
2009	Verano de amor	Miranda Perea Olmos	Lead role
2010	Mujeres asesinas	Eliana	Episode: "Eliana, cuñada"
2012	Rebelde	Herself	3 episodes
2012	Miss XV	Herself	1 episode
2013	Mentir para Vivir	Joaquina "Jackie" Barragán	Episodes 85–102
2014	Va por Ti	Coach	Season 1
2016	Corazón que miente	Renata Ferrer Jáuregui	Antagonist
2016	El Mejor Amigo del Hombre	Herself	Narrator
2017	Muy padres	Pamela Díaz	Lead role
2020	Falsa identidad	Victoria Lamas	Season 2
2020	¿Quién es la máscara?	Herself/Lioness	Season 3
2022	Divina Comida	Herself	Episodes 13–16
2023	Pienso en ti	Emilia Rivero Avedaño	Lead role

== Discography ==
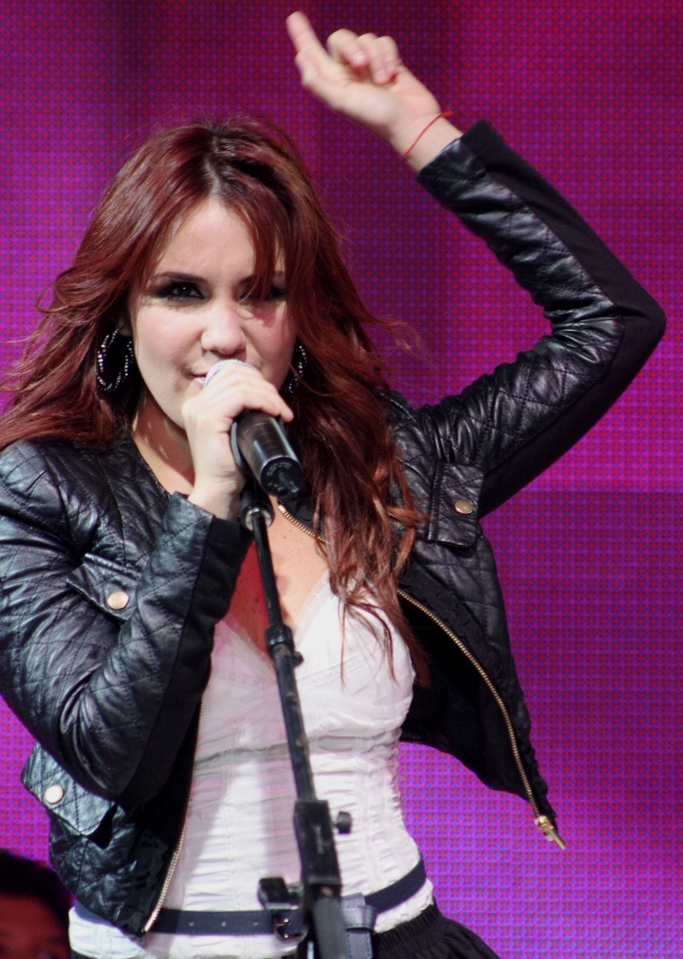
Mexican actress and musician Dulce María at Teleton 2011 in Mexico.

Studio albums

- Extranjera (Segunda Parte) (2011)
- Sin Fronteras (2014)
- DM (2017)
- Origen (2021)

== Tours ==
- Extranjera On Tour (2011–2012)
- Sin Fronteras On Tour (2014–2015)
- DM World Tour (2017)
- Origen Tour (2022)

== Written works ==
- Dulce Amargo (2007)
- Dulce Amargo – Recuerdos de una adolescente (2014)
