= 111 Centoundici =

2003 Tiziano Ferro album

111

Studio album by Tiziano Ferro
- Released: November 7, 2003 (Italy); November 10, 2003 (Spain, Latin America); January 7, 2005 (Turkey)
- Genre: R&B
- Label: EMI
- Producer: Tiziano Ferro; Alberto Salerno; Mara Maionchi; Michele Canova

Tiziano Ferro chronology
| Rosso relativo (2001) | 111 (2003) | Nessuno è solo (2006) |

Singles from 111
- 1. "Xverso" Released: September 12, 2003; 2. "Sere nere" Released: November 7, 2003; 3. "Non me lo so spiegare" Released: February 13, 2004; 4. "Ti voglio bene" Released: March 25, 2004

111 is the second studio album by Italian singer Tiziano Ferro, released on 7 November 2003 by EMI Italiana.

The album received wide success in Italy, topping the Italian Album Chart and selling over 450,000 copies, surpassing the success of previous album, Rosso relativo, in the country. The Spanish version of the album, 111 Ciento once, was also released the same year and helped the album sell over one million copies around the world, further cementing Ferro as a well-recognized international pop and R&B artist.

The album sold well due to the popularity of the first single "Xverso", but when single "Sere nere" was released the album increased in sales much faster, thanks to the song reaching No. 1 in the airplay charts of Italy and Mexico. In Turkey, the album was released on January 7, 2005.

== Track listing ==
Italian edition (111 Centoundici) 0724359554020 (jewel case 2003) – 5099996539422 (digipak 2009)
| No. | Title | Writer(s) | Producer(s) | Length |
|---|---|---|---|---|
| 1. | "Centoundici" | Tiziano Ferro | Tiziano Ferro, Alberto Salerno, Mara Maionchi, Michele Canova | 4:20 |
| 2. | "Xverso" | Ferro | Ferro, Salerno, Maionchi, Canova | 3:54 |
| 3. | "Sere nere" | Ferro | Ferro, Salerno, Maionchi, Canova | 4:25 |
| 4. | "Ti voglio bene" | Ferro | Ferro, Salerno, Maionchi, Canova | 4:46 |
| 5. | "In bagno in aeroporto" | Ferro | Ferro, Salerno, Maionchi, Canova | 2:49 |
| 6. | "Non me lo so spiegare" | Ferro | Ferro, Salerno, Maionchi, Canova | 4:00 |
| 7. | "Mia nonna" | Ferro | Ferro, Salerno, Maionchi, Canova | 3:32 |
| 8. | "10 piegamenti!" | Ferro | Ferro, Salerno, Maionchi, Canova | 2:50 |
| 9. | "Temple Bar" | Ferro | Ferro, Salerno, Maionchi, Canova | 4:07 |
| 10. | "Giugno '84" | Ferro | Ferro, Salerno, Maionchi, Canova | 3:13 |
| 11. | "Eri come l'oro ora sei come loro" | Ferro | Ferro, Salerno, Maionchi, Canova | 3:52 |
| 12. | "Chi non-ha talento insegna" | Ferro | Ferro, Salerno, Maionchi, Canova | 4:45 |
| 13. | "13 anni" | Ferro | Ferro, Salerno, Maionchi, Canova | 3:24 |

French Edition CD: 0724359552323
| No. | Title | Writer(s) | Producer(s) | Length |
|---|---|---|---|---|
| 12. | "Un Por Toi Un Pour Moi" ("Xverso" Italo-French version)" | Ferro | Ferro, Salerno, Maionchi, Canova | 3:54 |

Brazilian Edition CD: 724387352100
| No. | Title | Writer(s) | Producer(s) | Length |
|---|---|---|---|---|
| 14. | "Xdono" | Ferro | Ferro, Salerno, Maionchi | 3:59 |
| 15. | "Imbranato" | Ferro | Ferro, Salerno, Maionchi | 5:01 |
| 16. | "Sere nere" (Italian/Portuguese version feat. Liah)" | Ferro | Ferro, Salerno, Maionchi, Canova | 4:25 |

Spanish edition (111 Ciento once) CD: 0724359552521
| No. | Title | Writer(s) | Producer(s) | Length |
|---|---|---|---|---|
| 1. | "Ciento once" | Ferro, Mila Ortiz | Ferro, Salerno, Maionchi, Canova | 4:20 |
| 2. | "Perverso" | Ferro | Ferro, Salerno, Maionchi, Canova | 3:54 |
| 3. | "Tardes negras" | Ferro | Ferro, Salerno, Maionchi, Canova | 4:25 |
| 4. | "Ti voglio bene" | Ferro | Ferro, Salerno, Maionchi, Canova | 4:46 |
| 5. | "En el baño al aeropuerto" | Ferro, Ortiz | Ferro, Salerno, Maionchi, Canova | 2:49 |
| 6. | "No me lo puedo explicar" | Ferro | Ferro, Salerno, Maionchi, Canova | 4:00 |
| 7. | "Mi abuela" | Ferro, Ortiz | Ferro, Salerno, Maionchi, Canova | 3:32 |
| 8. | "10 piegamenti!" | Ferro | Ferro, Salerno, Maionchi, Canova | 2:50 |
| 9. | "Temple Bar" | Ferro | Ferro, Salerno, Maionchi, Canova | 4:07 |
| 10. | "Giugno '84" | Ferro | Ferro, Salerno, Maionchi, Canova | 3:13 |
| 11. | "Eri come l'oro ora sei come loro" | Ferro | Ferro, Salerno, Maionchi, Canova | 3:52 |
| 12. | "Quien no tiene talento enseña" | Ferro | Ferro, Salerno, Maionchi, Canova | 4:45 |
| 13. | "13 años" | Ferro | Ferro, Salerno, Maionchi, Canova | 3:24 |

Deluxe Edition CD: 0724359552620 (Argentina) – 0724359552729 (Latin America)
| No. | Title | Writer(s) | Producer(s) | Length |
|---|---|---|---|---|
| 14. | "Perdona" | Ferro | Ferro, Salerno, Maionchi | 3:59 |
| 15. | "Alucinado" | Ferro | Ferro, Salerno, Maionchi | 5:01 |
| 16. | "Universal Prayer" (feat. Jamelia) (only in Argentina)" | Ferro, Jamelia Davis, Tor Hermansen, S Mikkel, Tom Nichols | Tor Hermansen, S Mikkel, Tom Nichols | 4:07 |

DVD (Argentina, Mexico) CD+DVD: 0724356332409 (Argentina), CD+DVD: 0724357103909 (Mexico)
| No. | Title | Length |
|---|---|---|
| 1. | "Rojo Relativo Documentary" |
| 2. | "Ciento Once Documentary" |
| 3. | "Tardes negras" (Music video)" |
| 4. | "Sere nere" (Music video)" |
| 5. | "Imbranato" (Music video)" |
| 6. | "Exclusive photographs" |

== Charts ==
=== Weekly charts ===
| Chart (2003/2004) | Peak position |
|---|---|
| Belgian Albums (Ultratop Wallonia) | 48 |
| German Albums (Offizielle Top 100) | 61 |
| Italian Albums (FIMI) | 1 |
| Mexican Albums (Top 100 Mexico) | 1 |
| Spanish Albums (Promusicae) | 6 |
| Swiss Albums (Schweizer Hitparade) | 7 |
| US Latin Pop Albums (Billboard) | 11 |
| US Top Latin Albums (Billboard) | 32 |

=== Year-end charts ===
| Chart (2003) | Position |
|---|---|
| Swiss Albums Chart | 76 |
| Chart (2004) | Position |
| Italian Albums Chart | 3 |
| Swiss Albums Chart | 75 |

== Certifications and sales ==
| Region | Certification | Certified units/sales |
|---|---|---|
| Italy Up to 2004 | — | 260,000 |
| Italy (FIMI) Since 2009 | Platinum | 50,000^{‡} |
| Mexico (AMPROFON) Spanish version | 2× Platinum+Gold | 375,000^{^} |
| Spain (Promusicae) Spanish version | Gold | 50,000^{^} |
| Switzerland (IFPI Switzerland) | Gold | 20,000^{^} |
^{^} Shipments figures based on certification alone.^{‡} Sales+streaming figures based on certification alone.
