= Non me lo so spiegare =

Single by Tiziano Ferro

from the album 111
- Released: 13 February 2004
- Genre: Pop soul
- Length: 4:00
- Label: EMI
- Songwriter: Tiziano Ferro
- Producers: Alberto Salerno; Mara Maionchi

Tiziano Ferro singles chronology
"Sere nere" (2003)	"Non me lo so spiegare" (2004)	"Universal Prayer" (2004)

Music video
- "Non me lo so spiegare" on YouTube

"Non me lo so spiegare" (English: "I Can't Explain") is a song written and recorded by Italian singer Tiziano Ferro. It was released on 13 February 2004 as the third single from his second studio album, 111. The music video for the song was directed by Paolo Monico. The song was also translated in Spanish and recorded by Ferro himself for the Hispanic version of the album, under the title "No me lo puedo explicar".

In 2006, Ferro re-recorded the song as a duet with Italian singer Laura Pausini. This version of the song was included in Pausini's 2006 album Io canto and it was released as a single on 23 March 2007.

== Background and composition ==
During an interview released in November 2003, Ferro revealed that the song was initially written for his debut album, Rosso relativo, but it was not featured on the record for various reasons: "We didn't know if the album would have sold well, therefore we kept the song for the Sanremo Music Festival. If things would have gone bad, 'Non me lo so spiegare' would have been my entry for Sanremo".

The song is a pop ballad, described by Musica e dischi's Antonio Orlando as a "neoclassic Italian song". Orlando also compared "Non me lo so spiegare" to Claudio Baglioni's previous songs.

== Live performances ==
Tiziano Ferro performed the song in July 2004 during the Italian itinerant TV show Festivalbar, broadcast by Italia 1. He also performed the song in March 2007, when he participated as a guest artist in the semi-final of the 57th Sanremo Music Festival. A live version of the song was also included in Ferro's live video album Alla mia età live in Roma, released on 20 November 2009 and recorded in June 2009 during his concert at the Stadio Olimpico in Rome.

== Track listing ==
Digital download – "Non me lo so spiegare" (2004)

1. "Non me lo so spiegare" – 4:00

CD single – "No me lo puedo explicar" (2004)

1. "No me lo puedo explicar" – 4:00

== Personnel ==
Music credits

- Michele Canova – arrangements, rhythmic programming, keyboards
- Leonardo Di Angilla – percussions
- Tiziano Ferro – vocals, composer
- Andrea Fontana – drums
- Cristian Rigano – Rhodes piano, acoustic piano, keyboards
- Pino Saracini – bass
- Davide Tagliapietra – guitars

Production credits

- Michele Canova – producer, engineer, mixing
- Sandro Franchin – additional engineer
- Mara Maionchi – producer
- Alberto Salerno – producer

== Charts ==
Chart (2004)	Peak position
ERROR in "CIS": Invalid position: 230. Expected number 1–200 or dash (–).
Italy Airplay (Nielsen Music)	1

== Certifications ==
Region	Certification	Certified units/sales
Italy (FIMI)	Platinum	50,000^{*}
^{*} Sales figures based on certification alone.

== Laura Pausini cover ==
"Non me lo so spiegare"

Single by Laura Pausini feat. Tiziano Ferro

from the album Io canto
- Released: 23 March 2007
- Recorded: 2006 – Logic Studio, Milan, Italy
- Genre: Pop
- Length: 4:32
- Label: Atlantic Records
- Songwriter: Tiziano Ferro

Laura Pausini feat. Tiziano Ferro singles chronology
"Spaccacuore" (2007)	"Non me lo so spiegare" (2007)	"Destinazione paradiso" (2007)

Music video
- "Non me lo so spiegare" on YouTube

Laura Pausini recorded the song as a duet with Tiziano Ferro for her 2006's album Io canto. This version of the song was released on 23 March 2007 as the album's third single. The Spanish adaptation of the song, also featuring Ferro on vocals, was also included in the Hispanic version of the album, Yo canto.

=== Background ===
During an interview, Pausini revealed that, before starting the recording sessions for her album Io canto, entirely composed of covers of popular songs by Italian male artists, she had decided not to record duets with Italian singers. "I was afraid to offend the artists I didn't call, I wanted to record duets with foreign artists only, so that they could give something new to these popular songs. But when I started recording Tiziano's song, there was something missing, therefore I thought it was the right chance to put our voices together".

=== Live performances ===
Laura Pausini and Tiziano Ferro performed the song live for the first time on 30 January 2007 in Milan, during a venue of Tiziano Ferro's Nessuno è solo tour. "Non me lo so spiegare" was also performed as a duet with Ferro during Pausini's only 2007 concert, held at the San Siro Stadium on 2 July 2007. The concert was later released as a DVD under the title San Siro 2007, and it was broadcast by Italia 1 on 11 December 2007.

In December 2009, Pausini and Ferro performed together the song during an episode of Rai 2's TV programme Due, entirely dedicated to them.

=== Music video ===
The music video for the song, directed by Gaetano Morbioli, was filmed at the Dino Studios in Rome. The ambientation of the video recreates a desert, with an old petrol pump and roadsigns pointing to the Midwest. Pausini and Ferro are shown on opposite sides of a parked car, representing two aching souls who cannot look at each other.

=== Personnel ===
Music credits

- Riccardo Capanni – concert master
- Max Costa – programming, additional keyboards
- Cesare Chiodo – bass
- Emiliano Fantuzzi – acoustic guitar, electric guitar
- Tiziano Ferro – vocals, composer
- Gabriele Fersini – electric guitar
- Alfredo Golino – drums
- Filippo Martelli – string arrangement, string conductor
- Omersea Orchestra – strings
- Dado Parisini – keyboards, string arrangement
- Laura Pausini – vocals

Production credits

- Max Costa – pre-producer, mixing
- Emiliano Fantuzzi – pre-producer
- Dado Parisini – producer
- Jon Jacobs – engineer, mixing
- Francesco Luzzi – engineer
- Gabriele Gigli – assistant
- Matteo Bolzoni – assistant
- Dado Parisini – mixing

=== Charts ===
Chart (2007)	Peak position
Italy Airplay (Music Control)	18
Italy Digital Downloads (FIMI)	13
