= The Voice Brasil season 6 =

The Voice Brasil
- Season 6
- Hosted by: Tiago Leifert; Mariana Rios
- Judges: Carlinhos Brown; Michel Teló; Ivete Sangalo; Lulu Santos
- Winner: Samantha Ayara

Release
- Original network: Rede Globo
- Original release: September 21 – December 21, 2017

Season chronology
- ← Previous; Season 5 Next → Season 7

The sixth season of The Voice Brasil, premiered on Rede Globo on September 21, 2017, in the 10:30 / 9:30 p.m. (BRT / AMT) slot immediately following the primetime telenovela A Força do Querer.

The show is again hosted by Tiago Leifert, with Mariana Rios serving as backstage host. Lulu Santos, Carlinhos Brown and Michel Teló returned as the coaches, with Ivete Sangalo replacing Claudia Leitte, who took a hiatus after five seasons.

Samantha Ayara from Belo Horizonte won the competition on December 21, 2017, making Michel Teló's third win as a coach, & making her the third stolen artist to win the entire Brazilian season after Mylena Jardin in the previous season and Danilo Reis & Rafael in the third season.

== Teams ==
Key

- Winner
- Runner-up
- Eliminated in the Live shows
- Stolen in the Remix
- Eliminated in the Remix
- Eliminated in the Live Coaches' Battle
- Stolen in the Battle rounds
- Eliminated in the Battle rounds
- Eliminated in the Playoffs

| Coaches | Top 48 artists | | | | |
|---|---|---|---|---|---|
| Carlinhos Brown | | | | | |
| Carlinhos Brown | Vinicius D'Black | Gab Ferreira | Diego Karter | Isabel Antônio | Sinara Costa |
| Carlinhos Brown | ~~Mayer Brothers~~ | ~~Juliano Barreto~~ | Rose Barcellos | Aline Peixoto | Anna Julia |
| Carlinhos Brown | Antônio Pack | Dayane Felix | Deborah Vasconcellos | Dhi Ribeiro | |
| Michel Teló | | | | | |
| Michel Teló | Samantha Ayara | Alysson & Adysson | Douglas Alessi | Sérgio Dalcin | Mariana Volker |
| Michel Teló | Rhaysa | ~~Diego Karter~~ | ~~Sinara Costa~~ | Manoela Fortuna | Chai |
| Michel Teló | Felipe Maurente | Letícia Bastos | Luiza Winck | Rafaela Faria | Sara Meireles |
| Ivete Sangalo | | | | | |
| Ivete Sangalo | Carol Biazin | Juliano Barreto | ~~Day~~ | ~~Samantha Ayara~~ | Tiago Velame |
| Ivete Sangalo | ~~Alinne Alves~~ | ~~Douglas Alessi~~ | Danielle Dias | Babi Ceresa | Brenda Luce |
| Ivete Sangalo | Felipe Luziário | George Sants | Grazzi Brasil | Samuell Sabino | |
| Lulu Santos | | | | | |
| Lulu Santos | Day | Mariana Coelho | Alinne Alves | Alexandre Massau | Mayer Brothers |
| Lulu Santos | Jota.Pê | ~~Day~~ | ~~Rhaysa~~ | Nãnan Matos | Arthur Sena |
| Lulu Santos | Kako de Oliveira | Lili | Marília Lopes | Nathalia Bellar | Victor Filgueira |
Note: Italicized names are stolen contestants (names struck through within former teams).

== Blind auditions ==
Key

| ✔ | Coach pressed "I WANT YOU" button |
| | Artist defaulted to a coach's team |
| | Artist picked a coach's team |
| | Artist eliminated with no coach pressing their "I WANT YOU" button |
| | Artist is an 'All Star' contestant |

=== Episode 1 (Sept. 21) ===
| Order | Artist | Age | Hometown | Song | Coach's and contestant's choices | | | |
| Order | Artist | Age | Hometown | Song | Brown | Teló | Ivete | Lulu |
|---|---|---|---|---|---|---|---|---|
| 1 | Isabel Antonio | 16 | Kinshasa, Democratic Republic of the Congo | "Trem Bala" | ✔ | — | — | — |
| 2 | Alysson & Adysson | 25–21 | Caldas | "Malagueña Salerosa" | ✔ | ✔ | ✔ | ✔ |
| 3 | Nanda Moura | 24 | Manaus | "O Leãozinho" | — | — | — | — |
| 4 | Carol Biazin | 20 | Campo Mourão | "Daddy Lessons" | ✔ | ✔ | ✔ | ✔ |
| 5 | Nívea Paula | 27 | Ipatinga | "O Que Sobrou Do Sol" | — | — | — | — |
| 6 | Day | 22 | São Bernardo do Campo | "Deixe-Me Ir" | — | — | — | ✔ |
| 7 | Nicole Rosemberg | 23 | São Paulo | "Lança Perfume" | — | — | — | — |
| 8 | Dhi Ribeiro | 52 | Brasília | "Milagres do Povo" | ✔ | ✔ | — | — |

=== Episode 2 (Sept. 28) ===
| Order | Artist | Age | Hometown | Song | Coach's and contestant's choices | | | |
| Order | Artist | Age | Hometown | Song | Brown | Teló | Ivete | Lulu |
|---|---|---|---|---|---|---|---|---|
| 1 | Mayer Brothers (Vítor & Renan) | 21–19 | Rio de Janeiro | "Laranja" | ✔ | ✔ | — | ✔ |
| 2 | Nãnan Matos | 28 | Brasília | "Reconvexo" | — | ✔ | — | ✔ |
| 3 | Samantha Ayara | 20 | Belo Horizonte | "Pretty Hurts" | ✔ | ✔ | ✔ | ✔ |
| 4 | Negra Flor | 18 | Planaltina de Goiás | "Espumas ao Vento" | — | — | — | — |
| 5 | Jota.Pê | 24 | Osasco | "Sampa" | — | — | — | ✔ |
| 6 | Chai | 19 | Foz do Iguaçu | "Medo Bobo" | ✔ | ✔ | — | — |
| 7 | Douglas Alessi | 20 | Araguari | "Versace on the Floor" | ✔ | ✔ | ✔ | ✔ |
| 8 | Sérgio Dalcin | 34 | Bela Vista do Paraíso | "Caipira" | — | ✔ | ✔ | — |
| 9 | Deborah Vasconcellos | 35 | Rio de Janeiro | "É Luxo Só" | ✔ | — | — | — |
| 10 | Sâmela Ferreira | 21 | Brasília | "In The Name Of Love" | — | — | — | — |
| 11 | Alexandre Massau | 39 | Belo Horizonte | "Punk da Periferia" | — | — | — | ✔ |

=== Episode 3 (Oct. 5) ===
| Order | Artist | Age | Hometown | Song | Coach's and contestant's choices | | | |
| Order | Artist | Age | Hometown | Song | Brown | Teló | Ivete | Lulu |
|---|---|---|---|---|---|---|---|---|
| 1 | Danielle Dias | 24 | Mesquita | "Cryin'" | ✔ | ✔ | ✔ | ✔ |
| 2 | Kako de Oliveira | 38 | Florianópolis | "Água Da Minha Sede" | — | — | — | ✔ |
| 3 | Val Andrade | 36 | Curitiba | "Como Faz Com Ela" | — | — | — | — |
| 4 | Rose Barcellos | 54 | Rio de Janeiro | "Pé Na Areia" | ✔ | ✔ | — | — |
| 5 | George Sants | 28 | Boquim | "Drag Me Down" | ✔ | ✔ | ✔ | ✔ |
| 6 | Luiza Winck | 20 | Florianópolis | "Bem Me Quer" | — | ✔ | — | ✔ |
| 7 | Mariana Coelho | 17 | Vila Velha | "Por Enquanto" | ✔ | ✔ | ✔ | ✔ |
| 8 | Sinara Costa | 22 | Breves | "Loka" | — | ✔ | — | — |
| 9 | Alinne Alves | 27 | Ribeirão Pires | "Meiga e Abusada" | — | — | ✔ | — |
| 10 | Julyanna Lima | 22 | Alvorada d'Oeste | "Rise Up" | — | — | — | — |
| 11 | Antônio Pack | 34 | Palmeira das Missões | "Quando a Chuva Passar" | ✔ | — | — | ✔ |

=== Episode 4 (Oct. 12) ===
| Order | Artist | Age | Hometown | Song | Coach's and contestant's choices | | | |
| Order | Artist | Age | Hometown | Song | Brown | Teló | Ivete | Lulu |
|---|---|---|---|---|---|---|---|---|
| 1 | Felipe Luziário | 22 | São Gonçalo | "Andei Só" | ✔ | ✔ | ✔ | ✔ |
| 2 | Paola Poliny | 24 | Rio de Janeiro | "Cartomante" | — | — | — | — |
| 3 | Marília Lopes | 25 | Barueri | "Garganta" | — | — | — | ✔ |
| 4 | Juliano Barreto | 32 | Porto Alegre | "Say You'll Be There" | ✔ | ✔ | ✔ | ✔ |
| 5 | César Damasceno | 25 | Jaguapitã | "Você Partiu Meu Coração" | — | — | — | — |
| 6 | Rafaela Faria | 25 | Pindamonhangaba | "Envolvidão" | — | ✔ | — | — |
| 7 | Babi Ceresa | 24 | Brasília | "Side to Side" | — | — | ✔ | — |
| 8 | Dayane Felix | 28 | Morro de São Paulo | "Despacito" | ✔ | — | — | ✔ |
| 9 | Felipe Maurente | 26 | São Gonçalo | "Ela Só Quer Paz" | — | ✔ | ✔ | ✔ |
| 10 | Juliana Cortes | 33 | Curitiba | "Ponta de Areia" | — | — | — | — |
| 11 | Rhaysa | 24 | Rio de Janeiro | "Mercy" | — | ✔ | ✔ | ✔ |

=== Episode 5 (Oct. 19) ===
| Order | Artist | Age | Hometown | Song | Coach's and contestant's choices | | | |
| Order | Artist | Age | Hometown | Song | Brown | Teló | Ivete | Lulu |
|---|---|---|---|---|---|---|---|---|
| 1 | Vinicius D'Black | 32 | Rio de Janeiro | "Bom" | ✔ | ✔ | — | ✔ |
| 2 | Elias Britto | 21 | Serra | "Ela Une Todas as Coisas" | — | — | — | — |
| 3 | Nathalia Bellar | 32 | João Pessoa | "Vou Deitar e Rolar" | — | ✔ | — | ✔ |
| 4 | Manoela Fortuna | 23 | Pelotas | "Rehab" | — | ✔ | — | — |
| 5 | Maiquell Zafanelli | 30 | Timbó | "Acima do Sol" | — | — | — | — |
| 6 | Grazzi Brasil | 30 | São Paulo | "Alguém me Avisou" | ✔ | ✔ | ✔ | ✔ |
| 7 | Arthur Sena | 26 | Goiânia | "Mais uma Vez" | — | — | — | ✔ |
| 8 | Sara Meireles | 24 | São Luís | "Zero a Dez" | — | ✔ | — | — |
| 9 | Anna Julia | 22 | Erechim | "Shape of You" | ✔ | — | — | — |
| 10 | Nani | 24 | São Paulo | "Baba" | — | — | — | — |
| 11 | Tiago Velame | 34 | Salvador | "All of Me" | — | ✔ | ✔ | — |

=== Episode 6 (Oct. 26) ===
| Order | Artist | Age | Hometown | Song | Coach's and contestant's choices | | | |
| Order | Artist | Age | Hometown | Song | Brown | Teló | Ivete | Lulu |
|---|---|---|---|---|---|---|---|---|
| 1 | Jéssica Paranhos | 27 | Rio de Janeiro | "Sweet Love" | — | — | — | — |
| 2 | Samuell Sabino | 34 | São Paulo | "Uma História de Amor" | — | ✔ | ✔ | — |
| 3 | Letícia Bastos | 20 | Recife | "Te Assumi Pro Brasil" | — | ✔ | — | — |
| 4 | Aline Peixoto | 25 | Niterói | "Palavras ao Vento" | ✔ | — | — | — |
| 5 | Victor Filgueira | 19 | Arez | "That's What I Like" | ✔ | ✔ | ✔ | ✔ |
| 6 | Mariana Volker | 30 | Rio de Janeiro | "Evidências" | — | ✔ | — | — |
| 7 | Brenda Luce | 21 | Rio de Janeiro | "Mensagens de Amor" | — | — | ✔ | ✔ |
| 8 | Lili | 24 | Catas Altas | "Piece of My Heart" | — | — | Team full | ✔ |
| 9 | Gab Ferreira | 23 | Salvador | "Ilê Pérola Negra" | ✔ | ✔ | Team full | Team full |
| 10 | Taric | 27 | Salvador | "Can't Stop the Feeling!" | Team full | — | Team full | Team full |
| 11 | Diego Karter | 26 | Salvador | "Dia Especial" | Team full | ✔ | Team full | Team full |

== The Playoffs ==
The Playoffs began on November 2 and comprised episodes 7–9. Distinct from the past five seasons, the season six Playoffs are pre-recorded, thus featuring no interactive viewer component. Divided in twelve groups of four, the top forty eight artists perform for the coaches, with each coach eliminating two artists from their teams from each group. The remaining top twenty four artists advance to The Battles.

| Episode | Coach | Order | Artist | Song | Result |
|---|---|---|---|---|---|
| Episode 7 (November 2) | Lulu | 1 | Day | "Pillowtalk" | Advanced |
| Episode 7 (November 2) | Lulu | 2 | Jota.Pê | "Partido Alto" | Advanced |
| Episode 7 (November 2) | Lulu | 3 | Lili | "Quase Sem Querer" | Eliminated |
| Episode 7 (November 2) | Lulu | 4 | Victor Filgueira | "Fora da Lei" | Eliminated |
| Episode 7 (November 2) | Brown | 5 | Anna Julia | "Ritmo Perfeito" | Eliminated |
| Episode 7 (November 2) | Brown | 6 | Dayane Felix | "O Farol" | Eliminated |
| Episode 7 (November 2) | Brown | 7 | Mayer Brothers | "Drive My Car" | Advanced |
| Episode 7 (November 2) | Brown | 8 | Isabel Antonio | "Heal the World" | Advanced |
| Episode 7 (November 2) | Teló | 9 | Alysson & Adysson | "No Rancho Fundo" | Advanced |
| Episode 7 (November 2) | Teló | 10 | Letícia Bastos | "Eu, Você o Mar e Ela" | Eliminated |
| Episode 7 (November 2) | Teló | 11 | Manoela Fortuna | "Seven Nation Army" | Advanced |
| Episode 7 (November 2) | Teló | 12 | Rafaela Faria | "K.O." | Eliminated |
| Episode 7 (November 2) | Ivete | 13 | Babi Ceresa | "Quando Fui Chuva" | Eliminated |
| Episode 7 (November 2) | Ivete | 14 | Carol Biazin | "Telescope" | Advanced |
| Episode 7 (November 2) | Ivete | 15 | Felipe Luziário | "Quero Ser Feliz Também" | Eliminated |
| Episode 7 (November 2) | Ivete | 16 | Tiago Velame | "Dou Não Dou" | Advanced |
| Episode 8 (November 9) | Ivete | 1 | Douglas Alessi | "Pétala" | Advanced |
| Episode 8 (November 9) | Ivete | 2 | George Sants | "Me Abraça" | Eliminated |
| Episode 8 (November 9) | Ivete | 3 | Samantha Ayara | "What About Us" | Advanced |
| Episode 8 (November 9) | Ivete | 4 | Samuell Sabino | "Lábios de Mel" | Eliminated |
| Episode 8 (November 9) | Lulu | 5 | Arthur Sena | "Heaven" | Eliminated |
| Episode 8 (November 9) | Lulu | 6 | Nãnan Matos | "O Canto Dessa Cidade" | Advanced |
| Episode 8 (November 9) | Lulu | 7 | Nathalia Bellar | "Hoje Eu Quero Sair Só" | Eliminated |
| Episode 8 (November 9) | Lulu | 8 | Rhaysa | "Axé Acapella" | Advanced |
| Episode 8 (November 9) | Teló | 9 | Chai | "Proibida Pra Mim" | Eliminated |
| Episode 8 (November 9) | Teló | 10 | Diego Karter | "Vamos Fugir" | Advanced |
| Episode 8 (November 9) | Teló | 11 | Felipe Maurente | "Essa Mina É Louca" | Eliminated |
| Episode 8 (November 9) | Teló | 12 | Mariana Volker | "Roxanne" | Advanced |
| Episode 8 (November 9) | Brown | 13 | Aline Peixoto | "Higher Ground" | Eliminated |
| Episode 8 (November 9) | Brown | 14 | Deborah Vasconcellos | "Aquele Um" | Eliminated |
| Episode 8 (November 9) | Brown | 15 | Gab Ferreira | "Você Não Entende Nada" | Advanced |
| Episode 8 (November 9) | Brown | 16 | Vinicius D'Black | "Vou Desafiar Você" | Advanced |
| Episode 9 (November 16) | Brown | 1 | Antônio Pack | "I Don't Want to Miss a Thing" | Eliminated |
| Episode 9 (November 16) | Brown | 2 | Dhi Ribeiro | "Muito Obrigado Axé" | Eliminated |
| Episode 9 (November 16) | Brown | 3 | Juliano Barreto | "Assim Que Se Faz" | Advanced |
| Episode 9 (November 16) | Brown | 4 | Rose Barcellos | "Flor de Lis" | Advanced |
| Episode 9 (November 16) | Lulu | 5 | Alexandre Massau | "A Festa de Santo Reis" | Advanced |
| Episode 9 (November 16) | Lulu | 6 | Kako de Oliveira | "Trem das Onze" | Eliminated |
| Episode 9 (November 16) | Lulu | 7 | Mariana Coelho | "Me & Mr. Jones" | Advanced |
| Episode 9 (November 16) | Lulu | 8 | Marília Lopes | "E.C.T." | Eliminated |
| Episode 9 (November 16) | Ivete | 9 | Alinne Alves | "Don't You Worry 'bout a Thing" | Advanced |
| Episode 9 (November 16) | Ivete | 10 | Brenda Luce | "Pra Você Dar o Nome" | Eliminated |
| Episode 9 (November 16) | Ivete | 11 | Danielle Dias | "I Remember You" | Advanced |
| Episode 9 (November 16) | Ivete | 12 | Grazzi Brasil | "Amuleto da Sorte" | Eliminated |
| Episode 9 (November 16) | Teló | 13 | Luiza Winck | "You and I" | Eliminated |
| Episode 9 (November 16) | Teló | 14 | Sara Meireles | "Nessas Horas" | Eliminated |
| Episode 9 (November 16) | Teló | 15 | Sérgio Dalcin | "Nova York" | Advanced |
| Episode 9 (November 16) | Teló | 16 | Sinara Costa | "Sorte Que Cê Beija Bem" | Advanced |

== The Battles ==
The Battles round was broadcast on episode 10. The coaches can each steal two losing artists. The top 20 contestants will then move on to The Live Coaches' Battle.

Key

| Artist won the Battle and advanced to the Live Coaches' Battle |
| Artist lost the Battle but was stolen by another coach and advanced to the Live Coaches' Battle |
| Artist lost the Battle and was eliminated |

| Episode | Coach | Order | Winner | Song | Loser | Steal result | | | |
| Episode | Coach | Order | Winner | Song | Loser | Brown | Teló | Ivete | Lulu |
|---|---|---|---|---|---|---|---|---|---|
| Episode 10 (November 21) | Brown | 1 | Gab Ferreira | "Jack Soul Brasileiro" | Mayer Brothers | N/A | ✔ | — | ✔ |
| Episode 10 (November 21) | Teló | 2 | Alysson & Adysson | "Vá Pro Inferno Com Seu Amor" | Sinara Costa | ✔ | N/A | — | — |
| Episode 10 (November 21) | Ivete | 3 | Carol Biazin | "Jorge Maravilha" | Alinne Alves | — | — | N/A | ✔ |
| Episode 10 (November 21) | Lulu | 4 | Alexandre Massau | "Uma Noite e Meia" | Rhaysa | — | ✔ | — | Team full |
| Episode 10 (November 21) | Ivete | 5 | Samantha Ayara | "Me Adora" | Danielle Dias | — | — | N/A | Team full |
| Episode 10 (November 21) | Lulu | 6 | Mariana Coelho | "Sweater Weather" | Day | — | — | ✔ | Team full |
| Episode 10 (November 21) | Teló | 7 | Sérgio Dalcin | "Casa" | Diego Karter | ✔ | N/A | — | Team full |
| Episode 10 (November 21) | Brown | 8 | Isabel Antônio | "Andar Com Fé" | Rose Barcellos | Team full | — | — | Team full |
| Episode 10 (November 21) | Ivete | 9 | Tiago Velame | "Attention" | Douglas Alessi | Team full | ✔ | N/A | Team full |
| Episode 10 (November 21) | Lulu | 10 | Jota.Pê | "Nanã" | Nãnan Matos | Team full | Team full | — | Team full |
| Episode 10 (November 21) | Brown | 11 | Vinicius D'Black | "Sir Duke" | Juliano Barreto | Team full | Team full | ✔ | Team full |
| Episode 10 (November 21) | Teló | 12 | Mariana Volker | "O Quereres" | Manoela Fortuna | Team full | Team full | Team full | Team full |

== Live shows ==
The Live shows are the final phase of the competition. It consists of the coaches' battle, two weekly shows and the season finale.

Viewers in the Amazon time zone (Acre, Amazonas, Rondônia and Roraima) are cued to vote to save artists on the show's official website during the delayed broadcast.

Artist's info

- Artist from Team Brown
- Artist from Team Teló
- Artist from Team Ivete
- Artist from Team Lulu

Result details

- Artist was the winner
- Artist was runner-up
- Artist was saved by the fast pass
- Artist advanced on public's votes
- Artist was saved by coach
- Artist was stolen by coach
- Artist advanced to the final
- Artist was eliminated

=== Elimination chart ===
Live show results per week
| Artist | Week 1 | Week 2 | Week 3 | Finals |
|---|---|---|---|---|
| Samantha Ayara | Safe | Safe | Advanced | Winner |
| Carol Biazin | Safe | Safe | Advanced | Runner-up |
| Day | Safe | Safe | Advanced | Runner-up |
| Vinicius D'Black | Safe | Safe | Advanced | Runner-up |
| Alysson & Adysson | Safe | Safe | Eliminated | Eliminated (week 3) |
| Gab Ferreira | Safe | Safe | Eliminated | Eliminated (week 3) |
| Juliano Barreto | Safe | Safe | Eliminated | Eliminated (week 3) |
| Mariana Coelho | Safe | Safe | Eliminated | Eliminated (week 3) |
| Alinne Alves | Safe | Eliminated | Eliminated (week 2) | |
| Douglas Alessi | Safe | Eliminated | Eliminated (week 2) | |
| Sérgio Dalcin | Safe | Eliminated | Eliminated (week 2) | |
| Tiago Velame | Safe | Eliminated | Eliminated (week 2) | |
| Alexandre Massau | Eliminated | Eliminated (week 1) | | |
| Diego Karter | Eliminated | Eliminated (week 1) | | |
| Isabel Antônio | Eliminated | Eliminated (week 1) | | |
| Jota.Pê | Eliminated | Eliminated (week 1) | | |
| Mariana Volker | Eliminated | Eliminated (week 1) | | |
| Mayer Brothers | Eliminated | Eliminated (week 1) | | |
| Rhaysa | Eliminated | Eliminated (week 1) | | |
| Sinara Costa | Eliminated | Eliminated (week 1) | | |

=== Week 1 ===
==== Live Coaches' Battle ====
In the Live Coaches' Battle round, 4 artists (1 per team) were given a "fast pass" by their coaches, while the remaining 16 competed for 8 spots in the Remix round.

Fast Passes
| Team Carlinhos Brown | Team Michel Teló | Team Ivete Sangalo | Team Lulu Santos |
| Vinicius D'Black | Alysson & Adysson | Carol Biazin | Mariana Coelho |

| Episode | Coach | Order | Artist | Song | Result |
Episode 11 (December 5)
| Episode 11 (December 5) | Teló | 1 | Mariana Volker | "Cry Me a River" | Eliminated |
| Episode 11 (December 5) | Brown | 1 | Gab Ferreira | "Toda Menina Baiana" | Public's vote (54%) |
| Episode 11 (December 5) | Brown | 2 | Diego Karter | "Mais Bonito Não Há" | Eliminated |
| Episode 11 (December 5) | Lulu | 2 | Alinne Alves | "Tudo Bem" | Public's vote (61%) |
| Episode 11 (December 5) | Lulu | 3 | Jota.Pê | "Asa" | Eliminated |
| Episode 11 (December 5) | Ivete | 3 | Tiago Velame | "Tudo Bem" | Public's vote (66%) |
| Episode 11 (December 5) | Ivete | 4 | Samantha Ayara | "Sorry Not Sorry" | Public's vote (66%) |
| Episode 11 (December 5) | Brown | 4 | Sinara Costa | "Tudo Bem" | Eliminated |
| Episode 11 (December 5) | Brown | 5 | Isabel Antonio | "Emoções" | Eliminated |
| Episode 11 (December 5) | Teló | 5 | Douglas Alessi | "Sing" | Public's vote (54%) |
| Episode 11 (December 5) | Teló | 6 | Sérgio Dalcin | "Deus e Eu no Sertão" | Public's vote (55%) |
| Episode 11 (December 5) | Lulu | 6 | Alexandre Massau | "Minha Menina (Best Of My Love)" | Eliminated |
| Episode 11 (December 5) | Lulu | 7 | Mayer Brothers | "Story of My Life" | Eliminated |
| Episode 11 (December 5) | Ivete | 7 | Day | "Crying in the Club" | Public's vote (60%) |
| Episode 11 (December 5) | Ivete | 8 | Juliano Barreto | "Assim Caminha a Humanidade" | Public's vote (58%) |
| Episode 11 (December 5) | Teló | 8 | Rhaysa | "Karma" | Eliminated |

=== Week 2 ===
==== Remix ====
| Episode | Coach | Order | Artist | Song | Result |
Episode 12 (December 7)
| Episode 12 (December 7) | Ivete | 1 | Carol Biazin | "Here" | Coach's choice |
| Episode 12 (December 7) | Ivete | 2 | Day | "Na Sua Estante" | Stolen by Lulu |
| Episode 12 (December 7) | Ivete | 3 | Juliano Barreto | "Noite do Prazer" | Coach's choice |
| Episode 12 (December 7) | Ivete | 4 | Samantha Ayara | "Ovelha Negra" | Stolen by Teló |
| Episode 12 (December 7) | Ivete | 5 | Tiago Velame | "Best of You" | Eliminated |
| Episode 12 (December 7) | Teló | 6 | Alysson & Adysson | "Mercedita" | Coach's choice |
| Episode 12 (December 7) | Teló | 7 | Douglas Alessi | "Mesmo Sem Estar" | Eliminated |
| Episode 12 (December 7) | Teló | 8 | Sérgio Dalcin | "Coração Sertanejo" | Eliminated |
| Episode 12 (December 7) | Brown | 9 | Gab Ferreira | "Não Me Deixe Só" | Coach's choice |
| Episode 12 (December 7) | Brown | 10 | Vinicius D'Black | "Human Nature" | Coach's choice |
| Episode 12 (December 7) | Lulu | 11 | Alinne Alves | "Azul" | Eliminated |
| Episode 12 (December 7) | Lulu | 12 | Mariana Coelho | "Diamonds" | Coach's choice |

=== Week 3 ===
==== Semifinals ====
| Episode | Coach | Order | Artist | Song | Result | | |
| Episode | Coach | Order | Artist | Song | Public points | Coach points | Total points |
Episode 13 (December 14)
| Episode 13 (December 14) | Brown | 1 | Gab Ferreira | "Por Causa de Você Menina" | 41 | 00 | 41 |
| Episode 13 (December 14) | Brown | 2 | Vinicius D'Black | "24K Magic" | 59 | 30 | 89 |
| Episode 13 (December 14) | Brown | 3 | Gab Ferreira & Vinicius D'Black | "Meia Lua Inteira" | Non-competition performance | | |
| Episode 13 (December 14) | Teló | 4 | Alysson & Adysson | "Se Deus Me Ouvisse" | 41 | 00 | 41 |
| Episode 13 (December 14) | Teló | 5 | Samantha Ayara | "I'll Never Love This Way Again" | 57 | 30 | 87 |
| Episode 13 (December 14) | Teló | 6 | Alysson & Adysson & Samantha Ayara | "É Preciso Saber Viver" | Non-competition performance | | |
| Episode 13 (December 14) | Lulu | 7 | Day | "Céu Azul" | 48 | 30 | 78 |
| Episode 13 (December 14) | Lulu | 8 | Mariana Coelho | "Garota de Ipanema" | 52 | 00 | 52 |
| Episode 13 (December 14) | Lulu | 9 | Day & Mariana Coelho | "Tempos Modernos" | Non-competition performance | | |
| Episode 13 (December 14) | Ivete | 10 | Carol Biazin | "Dream On" | 62 | 30 | 92 |
| Episode 13 (December 14) | Ivete | 11 | Juliano Barreto | "Mind Trick" | 38 | 00 | 38 |
| Episode 13 (December 14) | Ivete | 12 | Carol Biazin & Juliano Barreto | "Beauty and the Beast" | Non-competition performance | | |

=== Week 4 ===
==== Finals ====
This week, the four finalists performed a solo cover song and an original song.

| Episode | Coach | Artist | Order | Solo song | Order | Original song | Result |
Episode 14 (December 21)
| Episode 14 (December 21) | Teló | Samantha Ayara | 3 | "Who You Are" | 6 | "Quando Tudo Acabar" | Winner (41%) |
| Episode 14 (December 21) | Ivete | Carol Biazin | 1 | "Million Reasons" | 8 | "Não Vai" | Runner-up |
| Episode 14 (December 21) | Lulu | Day | 2 | "Agora Eu Quero Ir" | 5 | "Meu Lugar" | Runner-up |
| Episode 14 (December 21) | Brown | Vinicius D'Black | 4 | "1 Minuto" | 7 | "Incondicional" | Runner-up |

== Ratings and reception ==
=== Brazilian ratings ===
All numbers are in points and provided by Kantar Ibope Media.

| Week | Title | Air date | Timeslot (BRT) | SP viewers (in points) | Rank timeslot | Source |
|---|---|---|---|---|---|---|
| 1 | The Blind Auditions 1 | September 21, 2017 | Thursday 10:30 p.m. | 25.2 | 1 | |
| 2 | The Blind Auditions 2 | September 28, 2017 | Thursday 10:30 p.m. | 24.3 | 1 | |
| 3 | The Blind Auditions 3 | October 5, 2017 | Thursday 10:30 p.m. | 25.6 | 1 | |
| 4 | The Blind Auditions 4 | October 12, 2017 | Thursday 10:30 p.m. | 24.3 | 1 | |
| 5 | The Blind Auditions 5 | October 19, 2017 | Thursday 10:30 p.m. | 26.0 | 1 | |
| 6 | The Blind Auditions 6 | October 26, 2017 | Thursday 10:30 p.m. | 22.5 | 1 | |
| 7 | The Playoffs 1 | November 2, 2017 | Thursday 10:30 p.m. | 20.8 | 1 | |
| 8 | The Playoffs 2 | November 9, 2017 | Thursday 10:30 p.m. | 22.4 | 1 | |
| 9 | The Playoffs 3 | November 16, 2017 | Thursday 10:30 p.m. | 21.9 | 1 | |
| 10 | The Battles | November 21, 2017 | Tuesday 10:30 p.m. | 20.3 | 1 | |
| 11 | Live Coaches' Battle | December 5, 2017 | Tuesday 10:30 p.m. | 23.1 | 1 | |
| 12 | Remix | December 7, 2017 | Thursday 10:30 p.m. | 21.9 | 1 | |
| 13 | Semifinals | December 14, 2017 | Thursday 10:30 p.m. | 25.0 | 1 | |
| 14 | Finals | December 21, 2017 | Thursday 10:30 p.m. | 25.8 | 1 | |

- In 2017, each point represents 245.700 households in 15 market cities in Brazil (70.500 households in São Paulo only)
