= Sere nere =

Single by Tiziano Ferro

from the album 111
- Released: 6 November 2003
- Recorded: 2003
- Genre: Pop soul
- Length: 4:24
- Label: EMI
- Songwriter: Tiziano Ferro
- Producers: Alberto Salerno; Mara Maionchi

Tiziano Ferro singles chronology
"Perverso" (2003)	"Sere nere" (2003)	"Non me lo so spiegare" (2004)

"Tardes negras" cover

"Sere nere" (English: "Dark Evenings") is a song written and performed by Italian singer Tiziano Ferro, released on 6 November 2003 as the second single from his second studio album 111.

A Spanish version of the song, entitled "Tardes negras", was also released, which charted at number 14 on the U.S. Billboard Hot Latin Songs.

Ferro performed the song at the MTV Europe Music Awards 2004, where he won in the Best Italian Act category. The music video for the single was filmed in Trieste, Italy.

== Charts ==
=== Weekly charts ===
Chart (2003–2004)	Peak position
Belgium (Ultratip Bubbling Under Wallonia)	4
CIS Airplay (TopHit)	75
Germany (GfK)	77
Netherlands (Single Top 100)	99
Russia Airplay (TopHit)	69
Spain (PROMUSICAE)	8
Switzerland (Schweizer Hitparade)	32
US Hot Latin Songs (Billboard)	14
US Latin Pop Airplay (Billboard)	16

=== Year-end charts ===
Chart (2003)	Position
CIS (TopHit)	127
Russia Airplay (TopHit)	129

Chart (2005)	Position
Brazil (Crowley)	67

== Certifications ==
Region	Certification	Certified units/sales
Italy (FIMI)	2× Platinum	100,000^{‡}
^{‡} Sales+streaming figures based on certification alone.
