= The Voice Brasil season 5 =

The Voice Brasil
- Season 5
- Hosted by: Tiago Leifert; Mariana Rios
- Judges: Lulu Santos; Carlinhos Brown; Claudia Leitte; Michel Teló
- Winner: Mylena Jardim

Release
- Original network: Rede Globo
- Original release: October 5 – December 29, 2016

Season chronology
- ← Previous; Season 4 Next → Season 6

The fifth season of The Voice Brasil, premiered on Rede Globo on October 5, 2016 in the 10:30 p.m. (BRT/AMT) slot immediately following the primetime telenovela A Lei do Amor.

The show is again hosted by Tiago Leifert, with Mariana Rios serving as backstage host. Lulu Santos, Carlinhos Brown, Claudia Leitte and Michel Teló returned as the coaches, with Ivete Sangalo appearing as guest mentor during the battle rounds.

Mylena Jardim, a 17-year-old R&B singer from Belo Horizonte, won the competition on December 29, 2016 with 34% of the final vote, making her the youngest winner so far, the second stolen artist to win after Danilo Reis & Rafael in the third season, and Michel Teló the first coach to win the show twice (and for two consecutive times).

== Teams ==
Key

- Winner
- Runner-up
- Eliminated in the Live Shows
- Stolen in the Remix round
- Eliminated in the Remix round
- Eliminated in the Live Coaches' Battle rounds
- Stolen in the Battle rounds
- Eliminated in the Battle rounds

Coaches	Top 48 artists			
Lulu Santos				
Lulu Santos	Dan Costa	Lumi	Gabriela Ferreira	Rafah
Lulu Santos	Cammie	Kassia Marvila	Vitória Carneiro	Denilson Bhastos
Lulu Santos	Fabiane Alcântara	~~Anna Akisue~~	~~Laura Dalmas~~	~~Sih~~
Lulu Santos	Isabela Huk	Kiko Britez	Lanna Rodrigues	
Carlinhos Brown				
Carlinhos Brown	Afonso Cappelo	D'Lara	Brena Gonçalves	~~Lumi~~
Carlinhos Brown	Laura Dalmas	Aretha Lima	Cinthia Ribeiro	Lilian & Layane
Carlinhos Brown	Nira Duarte	~~Camila Matoso~~	~~Cristyellem Camargo~~	Ariel
Carlinhos Brown	Gabi D'Paula	Laura Vieira	Peu Kuyumjian	
Claudia Leitte				
Claudia Leitte	Danilo Franco	Jade Baraldo	Alexey Martinez	~~Mylena Jardim~~
Claudia Leitte	Camila Matoso	Cobra	Joana Castanheira	Renan Zonta
Claudia Leitte	Sih	~~Kássia Marvila~~	~~Lumi~~	~~Rafah~~
Claudia Leitte	Jéssica Stephens	Lilian	Nanda Loren	
Michel Teló				
Michel Teló	Mylena Jardim	Bruno Gadiol	Gabriel Correa	~~Brena Gonçalves~~
Michel Teló	~~Jade Baraldo~~	Amanda Lince	Anna Akisue	Cristyellem Camargo
Michel Teló	Luan Douglas	Carol Ferreira	Carol Vianna	Fernanda Silva
Michel Teló	Lariani Acevedo	Luiz Otávio Reis	Mateus Santanielli	
Note: Italicized names are stolen contestants (names struck through within former teams).

== Blind auditions ==
Key

✔	Coach pressed "I WANT YOU" button
	Artist defaulted to this coach's team
	Artist elected to join this coach's team
	Artist eliminated with no coach pressing "I WANT YOU" button
	Artist is an 'All Star' contestant

=== Episode 1 (Oct. 5) ===
Order	Artist	Age	Hometown	Song	Coach's and contestant's choices			
Order	Artist	Age	Hometown	Song	Lulu	Brown	Claudia	Teló
1	Mylena Jardim	17	Belo Horizonte	"Olhos Coloridos"	✔	✔	✔	✔
2	Alexey Martinez	33	Pinar del Río, Cuba	"Pégate"	✔	✔	✔	✔
3	Samantha Ayara	19	Belo Horizonte	"Não Vale A Pena"	—	—	—	—
4	Afonso Cappelo	17	Belém	"Imbranato"	✔	✔	✔	✔
5	Lariani Acevedo	22	Passo Fundo	"Não Vou Mais Atrás de Você"	—	—	—	✔
6	Aretha Lima	19	Porto Alegre	"Influência do Jazz"	—	✔	—	—
7	Dan Costa	24	São José	"Preto e Branco"	✔	✔	—	✔
8	Renan Zonta	22	Curitiba	"Highway to Hell"	✔	✔	✔	✔
9	Luan Douglas	18	Palmares	"Pra Você"	✔	✔	✔	✔
10	Jordanna Cassimiro	21	Goiânia	"João de Barro"	—	—	—	—
11	Denilson Bhastos	29	Brasília	"Primavera"	✔	✔	—	✔

=== Episode 2 (Oct. 13) ===
Order	Artist	Age	Hometown	Song	Coach's and contestant's choices			
Order	Artist	Age	Hometown	Song	Lulu	Brown	Claudia	Teló
1	Lilian & Layane	29–23	Londrina	"Me Espera"	✔	✔	✔	✔
2	Rafah	29	Rio de Janeiro	"In the End"	✔	✔	✔	✔
3	Cinthia Ribeiro	36	Rio de Janeiro	"Cara Valente"	—	✔	✔	✔
4	Sih	27	São Paulo	"Faz Parte do Meu Show"	✔	—	—	—
5	Joana Castanheira	19	Florianópolis	"Toxic"	✔	✔	✔	✔
6	Felipe de Oliveira	23	Belo Horizonte	"Viajante"	—	—	—	—
7	Isabela Huk	24	Ponta Grossa	"Vapor Barato"	✔	✔	—	✔
8	Cristyellem Camargo	16	Bagé	"Tango Para Teresa"	—	✔	—	—
9	Luiz Otávio Reis	23	Boa Esperança	"Louca de Saudade"	✔	✔	✔	✔
10	Cobra	22	São Paulo	"Dream a Little Dream of Me"	✔	✔	✔	✔
11	Jade Baraldo	18	Brusque	"Romaria"	—	—	—	✔
12	Nathalia Cavalcante	19	Brasília	"Medo Bobo"	—	—	—	—

=== Episode 3 (Oct. 20) ===
Order	Artist	Age	Hometown	Song	Coach's and contestant's choices			
Order	Artist	Age	Hometown	Song	Lulu	Brown	Claudia	Teló
1	Lumi	32	Abuja, Nigeria	"Cheerleader"	—	—	✔	✔
2	Anna Akisue	17	São Paulo	"Apenas Mais Uma de Amor"	✔	—	—	—
3	D'Lara	34	Blumenau	"You Oughta Know"	✔	✔	✔	✔
4	Brena Gonçalves	27	Ilhéus	"Alguém Me Disse"	—	—	✔	✔
5	Cammie	16	Rio de Janeiro	"Listen"	✔	✔	—	—
6	Nira Duarte	21	Breves	"Pra Te Esquecer"	—	✔	✔	✔
7	Matheus Bastos	32	Aparecida de Goiânia	"Sosseguei"	—	—	—	—
8	Bruno Gadiol	18	Barueri	"Que Sorte a Nossa"	✔	✔	—	✔
9	Bruna Moraes	21	São Paulo	"Aprendendo a Jogar"	—	—	—	—
10	Camila Matoso	23	Rio de Janeiro	"Simples Desejo"	✔	✔	—	✔
11	Fabiane Alcântara	34	Belo Horizonte	"Não Quero Mais"	✔	✔	✔	✔
12	Kassia Marvila	17	Rio de Janeiro	"Coleção"	✔	✔	✔	✔

=== Episode 4 (Oct. 27) ===
Order	Artist	Age	Hometown	Song	Coach's and contestant's choices			
Order	Artist	Age	Hometown	Song	Lulu	Brown	Claudia	Teló
1	Gabriela Ferreira	17	Criciúma	"Chandelier"	✔	—	—	✔
2	Danilo Franco	26	Lauro de Freitas	"Gostava Tanto de Você"	✔	✔	✔	✔
3	Ariel	20	Macapá	"Encontros e Despedidas"	—	✔	—	—
4	Nanda Loren	28	Rio de Janeiro	"At Last"	✔	✔	✔	—
5	Juliara Ghiner	20	Cabo Frio	"Serrado"	—	—	—	—
6	Mateus Santanielli	18	Atibaia	"Escreve Aí"	✔	—	—	✔
7	Lanna Rodrigues	35	São João de Meriti	"Pra Você"	✔	—	—	—
8	Gabi D'Paula	26	Rio de Janeiro	"Força Estranha"	—	✔	✔	✔
9	Carol Hends	22	Penha	"Poeira da Lua"	—	—	—	—
10	Carol Vianna	18	Indaiatuba	"Sozinho"	✔	✔	✔	✔
11	Kiko Britez	26	Boa Vista	"As Dores do Mundo"	✔	✔	—	—
12	Amanda Lince	18	Uberlândia	"Infiel"	—	—	—	✔

=== Episode 5 (Nov. 3) ===
Order	Artist	Age	Hometown	Song	Coach's and contestant's choices			
Order	Artist	Age	Hometown	Song	Lulu	Brown	Claudia	Teló
1	Peu Kuyumjian	38	Cotia	"Yesterday"	—	✔	—	—
2	Vitória Carneiro	17	Luziânia	"Palpite"	✔	—	—	—
3	Lilian	32	Lauro Müller	"Faltando um Pedaço"	✔	✔	✔	—
4	Elian Flores	16	General Salgado	"Estou Apaixonado"	—	—	—	—
5	Laura Dalmas	18	Carlos Barbosa	"Nada Sei"	✔	—	—	—
6	Carol Ferreira	26	Ituiutaba	"Adivinha o Que"	Team full	✔	✔	✔
7	Jéssica Stephens	27	Manaus	"A História de Lily Braun"	Team full	✔	✔	—
8	Fernanda Silva	20	Ji-Paraná	"Tocando em Frente"	Team full	✔	Team full	✔
9	Laura Vieira	17	Catu	"Boa Sorte / Good Luck"	Team full	✔	Team full	—
10	Julia Ribeiro	17	Juazeiro	"Paciência"	Team full	Team full	Team full	—
11	Gabriel Correa	31	Brasília	"Chuva de Arroz"	Team full	Team full	Team full	✔

== The Battles ==
The Battles round started with episode 6 and ended with episode 8 (broadcast from November 9 to November 24, 2016). The coaches can steal two losing artists from another coach. Contestants who win their battle or are stolen by another coach will advance to the Live Coaches' Battle.

Coaches' advisor
Lulu Santos	Carlinhos Brown	Claudia Leitte	Michel Teló
Ivete Sangalo

Key

Artist won the Battle and advanced to the Live Coaches' Battle
Artist lost the Battle but was stolen by another coach and advanced to the Live Coaches' Battle
Artist lost the Battle and was eliminated

Episode	Coach	Order	Winner	Song	Loser	Steal result			
Episode	Coach	Order	Winner	Song	Loser	Lulu	Brown	Claudia	Teló
Episode 6 (November 9)	Claudia	1	Mylena Jardim	"Killing Me Softly with His Song"	Kassia Marvila	✔	✔	—N/a	✔
Episode 6 (November 9)	Brown	2	Lilian & Layane	"Pedaço de Mim"	Cristyellem Camargo	—	—N/a	—	✔
Episode 6 (November 9)	Teló	3	Bruno Gadiol	"Drag Me Down"	Mateus Santanielli	—	—	—	—N/a
Episode 6 (November 9)	Teló	4	Luan Douglas	"Te Dar Um Beijo"	Lariani Acevedo	—	—	—	—N/a
Episode 6 (November 9)	Brown	5	Cinthia Ribeiro	"Malandro Sou Eu"	Gabi D' Paula	—	—N/a	—	—
Episode 6 (November 9)	Lulu	6	Gabriela Ferreira	"Somewhere Only We Know"	Sih	—N/a	—	✔	—
Episode 6 (November 9)	Lulu	7	Denilson Bhastos	"Nosso Sonho"	Kiko Britez	—N/a	—	—	—
Episode 6 (November 9)	Claudia	8	Joana Castanheira	"Into You"	Jéssica Stephens	—	—	—N/a	—
Episode 7 (November 17)	Lulu	1	Cammie	"Rather Be"	Laura Dalmas	—N/a	✔	✔	✔
Episode 7 (November 17)	Teló	2	Gabriel Correa	"Implorando Pra Trair"	Luiz Otávio Reis	—	—	—	—N/a
Episode 7 (November 17)	Teló	3	Jade Baraldo	"Só Tinha de Ser Com Você"	Carol Ferreira	—	—	—	—N/a
Episode 7 (November 17)	Claudia	4	Alexey Martinez	"Bailando"	Lumi	—	✔	—N/a	—
Episode 7 (November 17)	Brown	5	Afonso Cappello	"Love of My Life"	Peu Kuyumjian	—	Team full	—	—
Episode 7 (November 17)	Claudia	6	Cobra	"O Leãozinho"	Lilian	—	Team full	—N/a	—
Episode 7 (November 17)	Brown	7	Aretha Lima	"Can't Feel My Face"	Camila Matoso	—	Team full	✔	✔
Episode 7 (November 17)	Lulu	8	Vitória Carneiro	"Não Vá Embora"	Lanna Rodrigues	—N/a	Team full	Team full	—
Episode 8 (November 24)	Brown	1	D'Lara	"I Kissed a Girl"	Laura Vieira	—	Team full	Team full	—
Episode 8 (November 24)	Teló	2	Brena Gonçalves	"Tigresa"	Carol Vianna	—	Team full	Team full	—N/a
Episode 8 (November 24)	Claudia	3	Renan Zonta	"Sweet Child o' Mine"	Rafah	✔	Team full	Team full	✔
Episode 8 (November 24)	Brown	4	Nira Duarte	"Sá Marina"	Ariel	Team full	Team full	Team full	—
Episode 8 (November 24)	Claudia	5	Danilo Franco	"Blecaute"	Nanda Loren	Team full	Team full	Team full	—
Episode 8 (November 24)	Lulu	6	Dan Costa	"Quando a Chuva Passar"	Anna Akisue	Team full	Team full	Team full	✔
Episode 8 (November 24)	Teló	7	Amanda Lince	"Flor e o Beija-Flor"	Fernanda Silva	Team full	Team full	Team full	Team full
Episode 8 (November 24)	Lulu	8	Fabiane Alcântara	"Set Fire to the Rain"	Isabela Huk	Team full	Team full	Team full	Team full

== Live shows ==
The Live shows are the final phase of the competition. It consists of the coaches' battle, two weekly shows and the season finale.

Viewers in the Amazon time zone (Acre, Amazonas, Rondônia and Roraima) are cued to vote to save artists on the show's official website during the delayed broadcast.

Artist's info

- Artist from Team Lulu
- Artist from Team Brown
- Artist from Team Claudia
- Artist from Team Teló

Result details

- Artist was the winner
- Artist was the runner-up
- Artist did not perform on that particular week
- Artist advanced on public's vote
- Artist was saved by coach
- Artist was stolen by coach
- Artist was eliminated
- Artist was eliminated but returned to competition

=== Elimination chart ===
Live show results per week
Artist	Week 1	Week 2	Week 3	Week 4	Finals
Mylena Jardim	Safe		Safe	Advanced	Winner
Afonso Cappelo		Safe	Safe	Advanced	Runner-up
Dan Costa		Safe	Safe	Advanced	Runner-up
Danilo Franco	Safe		Safe	Advanced	Runner-up
Bruno Gadiol		Safe	Safe	Eliminated	Eliminated (week 4)
D'Lara		Safe	Safe	Eliminated	Eliminated (week 4)
Jade Baraldo	Safe		Safe	Eliminated	Eliminated (week 4)
Lumi		Safe	Safe	Eliminated	Eliminated (week 4)
Alexey Martinez	Safe		Safe	Eliminated	Eliminated (week 4)
Brena Gonçalves		Safe	Safe	Eliminated	Eliminated (week 4)
Gabriel Correa	Safe		Safe	Eliminated	Eliminated (week 4)
Gabriela Ferreira	Safe		Safe	Eliminated	Eliminated (week 4)
Amanda Lince		Safe	Eliminated	Eliminated (week 3)	
Anna Akisue		Safe	Eliminated	Eliminated (week 3)	
Cristyellem Camargo	Safe		Eliminated	Eliminated (week 3)	
Luan Douglas	Safe		Eliminated	Eliminated (week 3)	
Rafah	Safe		Eliminated	Eliminated (week 3)	
Cammie		Eliminated	Eliminated (week 2)		
Camila Matoso		Eliminated	Eliminated (week 2)		
Cobra		Eliminated	Eliminated (week 2)		
Joana Castanheira		Eliminated	Eliminated (week 2)		
Kassia Marvila		Eliminated	Eliminated (week 2)		
Laura Dalmas		Eliminated	Eliminated (week 2)		
Renan Zonta		Eliminated	Eliminated (week 2)		
Vitória Carneiro		Eliminated	Eliminated (week 2)		
Aretha Lima	Eliminated	Eliminated (week 1)			
Cinthia Ribeiro	Eliminated	Eliminated (week 1)			
Denilson Bhastos	Eliminated	Eliminated (week 1)			
Fabiane Alcântara	Eliminated	Eliminated (week 1)			
Lilian & Layane	Eliminated	Eliminated (week 1)			
Nira Duarte	Eliminated	Eliminated (week 1)			
Sih	Eliminated	Eliminated (week 1)			

Key

Artist was saved by the public's votes
Artist was saved by his/her coach
Artist was stolen by another coach
Artist received the fewest public's votes and was immediately eliminated
Artist was eliminated

=== Week 1 ===
==== Live Coaches' Battle 1 ====
Episode	Coach	Order	Artist	Song	Result
Episode 9 (December 1)
Episode 9 (December 1)	Claudia	1	Danilo Franco	"Your Song"	Public's vote (64%)
Episode 9 (December 1)	Brown	1	Cinthia Ribeiro	"Você Me Vira a Cabeça"	Eliminated
Episode 9 (December 1)	Brown	2	Aretha Lima	"Rock with You"	Eliminated
Episode 9 (December 1)	Lulu	2	Gabriela Ferreira	"Chove Chuva"	Public's vote (74%)
Episode 9 (December 1)	Lulu	3	Rafah	"Dias de Luta, Dias de Glória"	Eliminated^{1}
Episode 9 (December 1)	Teló	3	Luan Douglas	"O Nosso Santo Bateu"	Public's vote (68%)
Episode 9 (December 1)	Teló	4	Cristyellem Camargo	"A Noite do Meu Bem"	Public's vote (57%)
Episode 9 (December 1)	Brown	4	Lilian & Layane	"O Melhor Vai Começar"	Eliminated
Episode 9 (December 1)	Brown	5	Nira Duarte	"Ex Mai Love"	Eliminated
Episode 9 (December 1)	Claudia	5	Mylena Jardim	"Rise Up"	Public's vote (53%)
Episode 9 (December 1)	Claudia	6	Alexey Martinez	"Proposta"	Public's vote (52%)
Episode 9 (December 1)	Lulu	6	Denilson Bhastos	"Monalisa"	Eliminated
Episode 9 (December 1)	Lulu	7	Fabiane Alcântara	"If I Ain't Got You"	Eliminated
Episode 9 (December 1)	Teló	7	Gabriel Correa	"Na Hora da Raiva"	Public's vote (70%)
Episode 9 (December 1)	Teló	8	Jade Baraldo	"Creep"	Public's vote (71%)
Episode 9 (December 1)	Claudia	8	Sih	"Amor pra Recomeçar"	Eliminated

- ^1 Rafah returned to the competition in week three due to graphics error in which incorrect voting numbers were displayed on screen during his Coaches' Battle performance.

=== Week 2 ===
==== Live Coaches' Battle 2 ====
Episode	Coach	Order	Artist	Song	Result
Episode 10 (December 8)
Episode 10 (December 8)	Lulu	1	Kassia Marvila	"I Have Nothing"	Eliminated
Episode 10 (December 8)	Brown	1	D'Lara	"What's Up?"	Public's vote (54%)
Episode 10 (December 8)	Brown	2	Lumi	"All Night Long (All Night)"	Public's vote (75%)
Episode 10 (December 8)	Claudia	2	Camila Matoso	"Bem Vindo Amor"	Eliminated
Episode 10 (December 8)	Claudia	3	Renan Zonta	"We Are the Champions"	Eliminated
Episode 10 (December 8)	Teló	3	Anna Akisue	"Something's Got a Hold on Me"	Public's vote (54%)
Episode 10 (December 8)	Teló	4	Amanda Lince	"10%"	Public's vote (65%)
Episode 10 (December 8)	Lulu	4	Cammie	"Hoje"	Eliminated
Episode 10 (December 8)	Lulu	5	Dan Costa	"Meu Mundo e Nada Mais"	Public's vote (57%)
Episode 10 (December 8)	Claudia	5	Joana Castanheira	"Coisa Linda"	Eliminated
Episode 10 (December 8)	Claudia	6	Cobra	"Use Somebody"	Eliminated
Episode 10 (December 8)	Brown	6	Afonso Cappelo	"Mais Que a Mim"	Public's vote (62%)
Episode 10 (December 8)	Brown	7	Laura Dalmas	"É Isso Aí"	Eliminated
Episode 10 (December 8)	Teló	7	Bruno Gadiol	"Sorry"	Public's vote (70%)
Episode 10 (December 8)	Teló	8	Brena Gonçalves	"Esotérico"	Public's vote (59%)
Episode 10 (December 8)	Lulu	8	Vitória Carneiro	"As Canções que Você Fez pra Mim"	Eliminated

=== Week 3 ===
==== Remix ====
Episode	Coach	Order	Artist	Song	Result
Episode 11 (December 15)
Episode 11 (December 15)	Claudia	1	Alexey Martinez	"La Barca"	Coach's choice
Episode 11 (December 15)	Teló	2	Amanda Lince	"É Com Ela Que Eu Estou"	Eliminated
Episode 11 (December 15)	Lulu	3	Gabriela Ferreira	"You Give Me Something"	Coach's choice
Episode 11 (December 15)	Teló	4	Cristyellem Camargo	"Hino Ao Amor (Hymne à l'amour)"	Eliminated
Episode 11 (December 15)	Brown	5	D'Lara	"Smells Like Teen Spirit"	Coach's choice
Episode 11 (December 15)	Teló	6	Anna Akisue	"Lágrimas e Chuva"	Eliminated
Episode 11 (December 15)	Brown	7	Afonso Cappelo	"Sem Ar"	Coach's choice
Episode 11 (December 15)	Teló	8	Jade Baraldo	"Qualquer Coisa"	Stolen by Claudia
Episode 11 (December 15)	Teló	9	Luan Douglas	"Ou Some ou Soma"	Eliminated
Episode 11 (December 15)	Lulu	10	Rafah	"Treat You Better"	Eliminated
Episode 11 (December 15)	Claudia	11	Danilo Franco	"Just the Way You Are"	Coach's choice
Episode 11 (December 15)	Teló	12	Brena Gonçalves	"Ainda Bem"	Stolen by Brown
Episode 11 (December 15)	Teló	13	Gabriel Correa	"Você Merece Cachê"	Coach's choice
Episode 11 (December 15)	Claudia	14	Mylena Jardim	"Nada Mais (Lately)"	Stolen by Teló
Episode 11 (December 15)	Brown	15	Lumi	"Imunização Racional"	Stolen by Lulu
Episode 11 (December 15)	Lulu	16	Dan Costa	"Dia, Lugar e Hora"	Coach's choice
Episode 11 (December 15)	Teló	17	Bruno Gadiol	"Stitches"	Coach's choice

=== Week 4 ===
==== Semifinals ====
Episode	Coach	Order	Artist	Song	Result
Episode 12 (December 22)
Episode 12 (December 22)	Lulu	1	Dan Costa	"Duas Metades"	Coach's choice
Episode 12 (December 22)	Lulu	2	Gabriela Ferreira	"Bang"	Public's vote (32%)
Episode 12 (December 22)	Lulu	3	Lumi	"Vamos Fugir"	Eliminated
Episode 12 (December 22)	Claudia	4	Alexey Martinez	"Corazón Partío"	Public's vote (31%)
Episode 12 (December 22)	Claudia	5	Danilo Franco	"Kiss the Sky"	Coach's choice
Episode 12 (December 22)	Claudia	6	Jade Baraldo	"Love Is a Losing Game"	Eliminated
Episode 12 (December 22)	Brown	7	Afonso Cappelo	"La solitudine"	Coach's choice
Episode 12 (December 22)	Brown	8	Brena Gonçalves	"Gatas Extraordinárias"	Public's vote (19%)
Episode 12 (December 22)	Brown	9	D'Lara	"Pagu"	Eliminated
Episode 12 (December 22)	Teló	10	Bruno Gadiol	"Lay Me Down"	Eliminated
Episode 12 (December 22)	Teló	11	Gabriel Correa	"Eu Sei de Cor"	Public's vote (29%)
Episode 12 (December 22)	Teló	12	Mylena Jardim	"Love on the Brain"	Coach's choice

=== Week 5 ===
==== Finals ====
Episode	Coach	Order	Artist	Song	Result
Episode 13 (December 29)
Episode 13 (December 29)	Claudia & Teló	1	Danilo Franco & Mylena Jardim	"Say Say Say"	—N/a
Episode 13 (December 29)	Lulu	2	Dan Costa	"Agora Eu Já Sei"	Runner-up
Episode 13 (December 29)	Brown	3	Afonso Cappelo ft. Cinthia Ribeiro	"Preciso Me Encontrar"	—N/a
Episode 13 (December 29)	Teló	4	Mylena Jardim	"Carnavalia"	Winner (34%)
Episode 13 (December 29)	Claudia	5	Danilo Franco ft. Renan Zonta	"Bete Balanço"	—N/a
Episode 13 (December 29)	Brown & Lulu	6	Afonso Cappelo & Dan Costa	"Sensível Demais"	—N/a
Episode 13 (December 29)	Claudia	7	Danilo Franco	"Cada Um, Cada Um"	Runner-up
Episode 13 (December 29)	Teló	8	Mylena Jardim ft. Anna Akisue	"Freedom! '90"	—N/a
Episode 13 (December 29)	Brown	9	Afonso Cappelo	"Pai"	Runner-up
Episode 13 (December 29)	Lulu	10	Dan Costa ft. Kassia Marvila	"Quem De Nós Dois"	—N/a

== Ratings and reception ==
=== Brazilian ratings ===
All numbers are in points and provided by IBOPE.

Episode	Title	Air Date	Timeslot (BRT)	Viewers (in points)	Rank Timeslot	Source
1	The Blind Auditions 1	October 5, 2016	Wednesday 10:30 p.m.	22.9	1	
2	The Blind Auditions 2	October 13, 2016	Thursday 10:30 p.m.	22.0	1	
3	The Blind Auditions 3	October 20, 2016	Thursday 10:30 p.m.	22.7	1	
4	The Blind Auditions 4	October 27, 2016	Thursday 10:30 p.m.	23.3	1	
5	The Blind Auditions 5	November 3, 2016	Thursday 10:30 p.m.	24.5	1	
6	The Battles 1	November 9, 2016	Wednesday 10:30 p.m.	21.4	1	
7	The Battles 2	November 17, 2016	Thursday 10:30 p.m.	22.0	1	
8	The Battles 3	November 24, 2016	Thursday 10:30 p.m.	21.3	1	
9	The Live Coaches' Battle 1	December 1, 2016	Thursday 10:30 p.m.	22.0	1	
10	The Live Coaches' Battle 2	December 8, 2016	Thursday 10:30 p.m.	21.4	1	
11	Remix	December 15, 2016	Thursday 10:30 p.m.	20.4	1	
12	Semifinals	December 22, 2016	Thursday 10:30 p.m.	17.8	1	
13	Finals	December 29, 2016	Thursday 10:30 p.m.	18.8	1	

- In 2016, each point represents 69.417 households in São Paulo.
