= Rosso relativo =

2001 Tiziano Ferro album

Studio album by Tiziano Ferro
- Released: 26 October 2001 (Italy); 4 March 2002 (Spain, Latin America); 6 June 2003 (Turkey)
- Recorded: 2000–2001
- Studios: Kaneepa Studio, Padua, Italy
- Genre: R&B
- Label: EMI
- Producers: Tiziano Ferro; Alberto Salerno; Mara Maionchi

Tiziano Ferro chronology
Rosso relativo (2001)	111 (2003)

Singles from Rosso relativo
- 1. "Perdono" Released: 12 May 2001; 2. "L'olimpiade" Released: 26 October 2001; 3. "Imbranato" Released: 18 January 2002; 4. "Rosso relativo" Released: 6 July 2002; 5. "Le cose che non dici" Released: 4 February 2003

Rosso relativo is the debut studio album by Italian singer Tiziano Ferro. The album was released on 26 October 2001 in Europe by EMI Italiana. The album was later released in the rest of the world in 2002 and 2003. A spanish language version of the record, titled Rojo Relativo, was released on 4 March 2002 in Spain and Latin America.

"Xdono", was released on 22 June 2001 as the lead single from and the album, and became Ferro's first No. 1 song on the Italian singles chart.

The single "Perdona" was well received in Latin American countries, but it was not until the release of the single "Alucinado" that Ferro was established as an international star in Latin America.

== Commercial reception ==
The album, through its many editions for different parts of the world, is still the most commercially successful release from the singer, with more than 2.5 million copies sold worldwide. Its singles also managed to obtain good positions on radio charts in many countries outside of Italy.

The single "Xdono" from the album made Ferro known to the general public and obtained a flattering 3rd place in the best-selling singles in Europe in 2002, placing only after singles by worldwide superstars Eminem and Shakira.

The Spanish single "Alucinado", from the Spanish-language version of the album, further solidified Ferro's career in Latin America, obtaining No. 1 placings in the charts of Mexico, Chile and Spain, as well as becoming a top five hit on the U.S. Billboard Hot Latin Songs. In Turkey, the album was released on 6 June 2003.

== Track listing ==
Italian edition CD: 0724353655426 (jewel case, 2001) – 5099996545829 (digipak, 2009)
No.	Title	Writer(s)	Producer(s)	Length
1.	"Le cose che non dici"	Tiziano Ferro	Ferro; Alberto Salerno; Mara Maionchi	3:56
2.	"Rosso relativo"	Ferro	Ferro; Salerno; Maionchi	4:00
3.	"Perdono"	Ferro	Ferro; Salerno; Maionchi	3:59
4.	"Imbranato"	Ferro	Ferro; Salerno; Maionchi	5:01
5.	"Di più"	Ferro	Ferro; Salerno; Maionchi	3:55
6.	"Mai nata"	Ferro	Ferro; Salerno; Maionchi	3:49
7.	"Primavera non è più"	Ferro	Ferro; Salerno; Maionchi	3:03
8.	"Il confine"	Ferro	Ferro; Salerno; Maionchi	4:10
9.	"Boom Boom"	Ferro; Salerno	Ferro; Salerno; Maionchi	4:17
10.	"L'olimpiade"	Ferro	Ferro; Salerno; Maionchi	3:40
11.	"Soul-Dier" (with Big Soul Mama Gospel Choir)	Ferro	Ferro; Salerno; Maionchi	4:32
12.	"Il bimbo dentro"	Ferro	Ferro; Salerno; Maionchi	4:35

Bonus Track (International Edition) CD: 0724353969929 (2002)
No.	Title	Writer(s)	Producer(s)	Length
13.	"Perdono" (English version)	Ferro	Ferro; Salerno; Maionchi	3:59

Bonus Track (Brazilian and Portuguese Edition) CD: 0724353969929 (2002)
No.	Title	Writer(s)	Producer(s)	Length
13.	"Apaixonado"	Ferro	Ferro; Salerno; Maionchi	5:01
14.	"Perdoa"	Ferro	Ferro; Salerno; Maionchi	3:59
15.	"Romance relativo"	Ferro	Ferro; Salerno; Maionchi	4:00

Bonus Track (German, Dutch, American, Canadian, Australian and Austrian Edition) CD: 0724353969929 (2001)
No.	Title	Writer(s)	Producer(s)	Length
4.	"Imbranato" (Italo-French version)	Ferro	Ferro; Salerno; Maionchi	5:01
13.	"Perdono" (Italo-French version)	Ferro	Ferro; Salerno; Maionchi; Valentina.Y	5:01
14.	"Perdono" (English version)	Ferro	Ferro; Salerno; Maionchi	3:59
15.	"Rosso Relativo" (Italo-French version)	Ferro	Ferro; Salerno; Maionchi	4:00

Bonus Track (Russian Edition)
No.	Title	Writer(s)	Producer(s)	Length
13.	"Perdono" (English version)	Ferro	Ferro; Salerno; Maionchi	3:59
14.	"Imbranato"	Ferro	Ferro; Salerno; Maionchi	5:01
15.	"Imbranato" (Italo-French version)	Ferro	Ferro; Salerno; Maionchi	5:01
16.	"Alucinado" ("Imbranato" Spanish version)	Ferro	Ferro; Salerno; Maionchi	5:01

Belgian Edition CD: 0724353969523 (2002)
No.	Title	Writer(s)	Producer(s)	Length
1.	"Le cose che non dici"	Ferro	Ferro; Salerno; Maionchi	3:56
2.	"Rosso relativo"	Ferro	Ferro; Salerno; Maionchi	4:00
3.	"Perdono" (Italo-French version)	Ferro	Ferro; Salerno; Maionchi	3:59
4.	"Imbranato" (Italo-French version)	Ferro	Ferro; Salerno; Maionchi	5:01
5.	"Di più"	Ferro	Ferro; Salerno; Maionchi	3:55
6.	"Mai nata"	Ferro	Ferro; Salerno; Maionchi	3:49
7.	"Primavera non è più"	Ferro	Ferro; Salerno; Maionchi	3:03
8.	"Il confine"	Ferro	Ferro; Salerno; Maionchi	4:10
9.	"Boom Boom"	Ferro; Salerno	Ferro; Salerno; Maionchi	4:17
10.	"L'olimpiade"	Ferro	Ferro; Salerno; Maionchi	3:40
11.	"Soul-Dier"	Ferro	Ferro; Salerno; Maionchi	4:32
12.	"Il bimbo dentro"	Ferro	Ferro; Salerno; Maionchi	4:35
13.	"Perdono"	Ferro	Ferro; Salerno; Maionchi	3:59
14.	"Imbranato"	Ferro	Ferro; Salerno; Maionchi	5:01

French Edition CD: 0724353969523 (2002)
No.	Title	Writer(s)	Producer(s)	Length
1.	"Le cose che non dici"	Ferro	Ferro; Salerno; Maionchi	3:56
2.	"Rosso relativo"	Ferro	Ferro; Salerno; Maionchi	4:00
3.	"Perdono" (Italo-French version)	Ferro	Ferro; Salerno; Maionchi	3:59
4.	"Imbranato"	Ferro	Ferro; Salerno; Maionchi	5:01
5.	"Di più"	Ferro	Ferro; Salerno; Maionchi	3:55
6.	"Mai nata"	Ferro	Ferro; Salerno; Maionchi	3:49
7.	"Primavera non è più"	Ferro	Ferro; Salerno; Maionchi	3:03
8.	"Il confine"	Ferro	Ferro; Salerno; Maionchi	4:10
9.	"Boom Boom"	Ferro; Salerno	Ferro; Salerno; Maionchi	4:17
10.	"L'olimpiade"	Ferro	Ferro; Salerno; Maionchi	3:40
11.	"Soul-Dier"	Ferro	Ferro; Salerno; Maionchi	4:32
12.	"Il bimbo dentro"	Ferro	Ferro; Salerno; Maionchi	4:35
13.	"Perdono"	Ferro	Ferro; Salerno; Maionchi	3:59

Rojo Relativo Latin America CD: 724353969622 (2002)
No.	Title	Writer(s)	Producer(s)	Length
1.	"Las cosas que no dices"	Ferro; Ignacio Ballesteros	Ferro; Salerno; Maionchi	3:56
2.	"Rojo relativo"	Ferro; Ballesteros	Ferro; Salerno; Maionchi	4:01
3.	"Perdona"	Ferro; Ballesteros	Ferro; Salerno; Maionchi	3:59
4.	"Alucinado"	Ferro; Ballesteros	Ferro; Salerno; Maionchi	5:03
5.	"Y más"	Ferro; Ballesteros	Ferro; Salerno; Maionchi	3:57
6.	"Si no hubiera nacido"	Ferro; Ballesteros	Ferro; Salerno; Maionchi	3:51
7.	"Primavera nunca fue"	Ferro; Ballesteros	Ferro; Salerno; Maionchi	3:04
8.	"El confin"	Ferro; Ballesteros	Ferro; Salerno; Maionchi	4:11
9.	"Boom Boom"	Ferro; Ballesteros; Salerno	Ferro; Salerno; Maionchi	4:18
10.	"La olimpiada"	Ferro; Ballesteros	Ferro; Salerno; Maionchi	3:40
11.	"Soul-Dier"	Ferro	Ferro; Salerno; Maionchi	4:32
12.	"Il bimbo dentro"	Ferro	Ferro; Salerno; Maionchi	4:35
13.	"Xdono"	Ferro	Ferro; Salerno; Maionchi	3:59

Rojo Relativo Spain CD: 724358288421 (2002)
No.	Title	Writer(s)	Producer(s	Length
1.	"Las cosas que no dices"	Ferro; Ballesteros	Ferro; Salerno; Maionchi	3:56
2.	"Rojo relativo"	Ferro; Ballesteros	Ferro; Salerno; Maionchi	4:01
3.	"Perdona"	Ferro; Ballesteros	Ferro; Salerno; Maionchi	3:59
4.	"Alucinado"	Ferro; Ballesteros	Ferro; Salerno; Maionchi	5:03
5.	"Y más"	Ferro; Ballesteros	Ferro; Salerno; Maionchi	3:57
6.	"Si no hubiera nacido"	Ferro; Ballesteros	Ferro; Salerno; Maionchi	3:51
7.	"Primavera nunca fue"	Ferro; Ballesteros	Ferro; Salerno; Maionchi	3:04
8.	"El confin"	Ferro; Ballesteros	Ferro; Salerno; Maionchi	4:11
9.	"Boom Boom"	Ferro; Salerno	Ferro; Salerno; Maionchi	4:18
10.	"La olimpiada"	Ferro; Ballesteros	Ferro; Salerno; Maionchi	3:40
11.	"Soul-Dier"	Ferro	Ferro; Salerno; Maionchi	4:32
12.	"Il bimbo dentro"	Ferro	Ferro; Salerno; Maionchi	4:35
13.	"Imbranato"	Ferro	Ferro; Salerno; Maionchi	5:02
14.	"Alucinado" (Obadam's Radio Edit)	Ferro; Ballesteros	Obadam	3:49
15.	"Alucinado" (D-Menace Salsa Remix)	Ferro; Ballesteros	D-Menace	4:29

Rojo Relativo Argentina and Mexico CD: 0724358183528 (2002)-Different cover in Mexico-
No.	Title	Writer(s)	Producer(s	Length
1.	"Las cosas que no dices"	Ferro; Ballesteros	Ferro; Salerno; Maionchi	3:56
2.	"Rojo relativo"	Ferro; Ballesteros	Ferro; Salerno; Maionchi	4:01
3.	"Perdona"	Ferro; Ballesteros	Ferro; Salerno; Maionchi	3:59
4.	"Alucinado"	Ferro; Ballesteros	Ferro; Salerno; Maionchi	5:03
5.	"Y más"	Ferro; Ballesteros	Ferro; Salerno; Maionchi	3:57
6.	"Si no hubiera nacido"	Ferro; Ballesteros	Ferro; Salerno; Maionchi	3:51
7.	"Primavera nunca fue"	Ferro; Ballesteros	Ferro; Salerno; Maionchi	3:04
8.	"El confin"	Ferro; Ballesteros	Ferro; Salerno; Maionchi	4:11
9.	"Boom Boom"	Ferro; Salerno	Ferro; Salerno; Maionchi	4:18
10.	"La olimpiada"	Ferro; Ballesteros	Ferro; Salerno; Maionchi	3:40
11.	"Soul-Dier"	Ferro	Ferro; Salerno; Maionchi	4:32
12.	"Il bimbo dentro"	Ferro	Ferro; Salerno; Maionchi	4:35
13.	"Xdono"	Ferro	Ferro; Salerno; Maionchi	3:59
14.	"Imbranato"	Ferro	Ferro; Salerno; Maionchi	5:02
15.	"Rosso relativo"	Ferro	Ferro; Salerno; Maionchi	4:00

== Charts ==
=== Weekly charts ===
Chart (2001/2002)	Peak position
Austrian Albums (Ö3 Austria)	7
Belgian Albums (Ultratop Flanders)	30
Belgian Albums (Ultratop Wallonia)	18
Dutch Albums (Album Top 100)	40
French Albums (SNEP)	25
German Albums (Offizielle Top 100)	9
Hungarian Albums (MAHASZ)	37
Italian Albums (FIMI)	5
Mexican Albums (Top 100 Mexico)	5
Spanish Albums (Promusicae)	4
Swiss Albums (Schweizer Hitparade)	5
US Latin Pop Albums (Billboard)	13
US Top Latin Albums (Billboard)	35

=== Year-end charts ===
Chart (2002)	Position
Belgian Albums Chart (Wallonia)	45
Italian Albums Chart	6
Swiss Albums Chart	9

== Certifications and sales ==
Region	Certification	Certified units/sales
Belgium (BRMA)	Gold	25,000^{*}
France (SNEP)	Gold	100,000^{*}
Italy (FIMI)	3× Platinum	300,000^{*}
Mexico (AMPROFON)	Platinum	150,000^{^}
Spain (Promusicae) Rojo Relativo	Platinum	100,000^{^}
Switzerland (IFPI Switzerland)	Platinum	40,000^{^}
Turkey (Mü-YAP)	Gold	100,000^{x}
^{*} Sales figures based on certification alone.^{^} Shipments figures based on certification alone.
