= Ilha Record 2 =

- Season 2
- Hosted by: Mariana Rios
- No. of contestants: 13
- Winner: Nakagima
- Runner-up: Kaik Pereira
- No. of episodes: 42

Release
- Original network: RecordTV
- Original release: July 18 – September 8, 2022

Additional information
- Filming dates: June 12 – July 21, 2022

Season chronology
- ← Previous; Season 1

The second and final season of Ilha Record premiered on Monday, July 18, 2022, at 10:45 p.m. on RecordTV.

The show features a group of celebrities, known as Explorers, living together on a desert island and competing against each other in extreme challenges to avoid being exiled and continue their quest for lost treasures and the grand prize of R$500.000. Prior to the live finale, a public vote is held to determine who would become the season's Favorite Explorer and win the special prize of R$250.000.

Nakagima won competition after defeating Kaik Pereira at the Island's final treasure hunt and took home the grand prize of R$500.000. Solange Gomes won the public's special prize of R$250.000 with 49.82% of the final vote against Ste Viegas, Bruno Sutter and Caíque Aguiar. In addition, Kaik Pereira received R$100.000 as runner-up, while Fábio Braz earned R$30.000 for being part of Nakagima's crew in the final.

== Cast ==
=== Explorers ===
The celebrities were officially revealed by RecordTV on June 26, 2022.

Celebrity	Age	Hometown	Known for	Original crew	Status	Finish
Vitória Bellato	22	Varginha	Digital influencer	No Crew	1st Exiled on July 20, 2022	13th
Aline Dahlen	40	Porto Alegre	Actress & bodybuilder	Amethyst	Walked on July 21, 2022	12th
Kaio Viana; Returned on August 4	26	Aracaju	Singer	Emerald	2nd Exiled on July 21, 2022	Returned
Caíque Aguiar; Returned on August 4	27	São Paulo	Actor & personal trainer	Amethyst	3rd Exiled on July 28, 2022	Returned
Solange Gomes; Returned on August 22	48	Rio de Janeiro	Writer	Emerald	4th Exiled on August 4, 2022	Returned
Jaciara Dias; Returned on August 22	44	Feira de Santana	Digital influencer	Emerald	5th Exiled on August 4, 2022	Returned
Nakagima; Returned on August 22	34	Praia Grande	Surfer	Amethyst	6th Exiled on August 11, 2022	Returned
Kaio Viana	26	Aracaju	Singer	Emerald	6th Exiled on August 11, 2022	11th
Whendy Tavares	27	Três Lagoas	Digital influencer	Amethyst	7th Exiled on August 18, 2022	10th
Raphael Sander	34	São Paulo	Actor	Amethyst	8th Exiled on August 22, 2022	9th
Caíque Aguiar	27	São Paulo	Actor & personal trainer	Amethyst	9th Exiled on August 22, 2022	8th
Fábio Braz	43	São Paulo	Former football player	Emerald	10th Exiled on August 22, 2022	7th
Jaciara Dias	44	Feira de Santana	Digital influencer	Emerald	11th Exiled on August 25, 2022	6th
Solange Gomes	48	Rio de Janeiro	Writer	Emerald	12th Exiled on September 2, 2022	5th
Bruno Sutter	42	São Paulo	Comedian & musician	Emerald	13th Exiled on September 5, 2022	4th
Ste Viegas	30	Rio de Janeiro	Model & digital influencer	Emerald	14th Exiled on September 5, 2022	3rd
Kaik Pereira	19	São Paulo	Actor & digital influencer	Amethyst	Runner-up on September 8, 2022	2nd
Nakagima	34	Praia Grande	Surfer	Amethyst	Winner on September 8, 2022	1st

== Future Appearances ==
In 2023, Whendy Tavares appeared in A Fazenda 15, she entered in the Warehouse where the public voted for four contestants to move into the main house, she didn't receive enough votes to enter in the game.

== The game ==
Distributed pieces of map	T Total maps combined	Won the pieces of map (adds the maps sum)	Didn't won the pieces of map (kept the maps sum)	Received the exile's pieces of map (adds the maps sum)

=== Maps progress ===
		Cycle 1	Cycle 2	Cycle 3	Cycle 4	Cycle 5	Cycle 6		Cycle 7	Cycle 8	
		Cycle 1	Cycle 2	Cycle 3	Cycle 4	Cycle 5	Day 31	Day 34	Cycle 7	Day 43	Finale
Sum of maps		4	2	3	2	2	3		2	2	Jackpot
Maps
Nakagima		0	1	0	0		1	—	2	1	10
Nakagima	T	0	1	1	1		1	1	3	10	10
Kaik		1	0	0	0	0	0	—	0	1	10
Kaik	T	1	1	1	1	1	3	3	4	10	10
Ste		0	0	1	0	0	0	—	0	0	
Ste	T	0	0	1	2	3	4	4	5	5	
Bruno		0	0	1	0	1	0	—	0	0	
Bruno	T	0	0	1	1	3	4	6	6	6	
Solange		0	0	0			1	—	0		
Solange	T	0	0	0			2	2	2		
Jaciara		0	1	0			1	—			
Jaciara	T	0	1	1			2	2			
Fábio		0	0	1	0	1	0				
Fábio	T	0	0	1	1	2	2				
Caíque		2	0	—	0	0	0				
Caíque	T	2	2	0	0	0	0				
Raphael		1	0	0	0	0	0				
Raphael	T	1	3	3	3	4	4				
Whendy		0	0	0	1	0					
Whendy	T	0	0	0	3	3					
Kaio		0		—	1						
Kaio	T	0		1	2						
Aline		0									
Aline	T	0									
Vitória		0									
Vitória	T	0									

=== Voting history ===
	Cycle 1	Cycle 2	Cycle 3		Cycle 4	Cycle 5	Cycle 6			Cycle 7	Cycle 8	
	Day 3	Day 9	Day 15	Day 16	Day 21	Day 27	Day 31		Day 33	Day 39	Day 43	Finale
	Day 3	Day 9	Day 15	Day 16	Day 21	Day 27	Survival	Wildcard	Day 33	Day 39	Day 43	Finale
Commanders	Caíque; Bruno	Kaik; Solange	Raphael; Bruno	(none)	Caíque; Kaio	Ste; Fábio	(none)		(none)	Bruno; Nakagima	(none)	Kaik; Nakagima
Winning Commander	Caíque	Kaik	Bruno	(none)	Kaio	Fábio	(none)		Kaik	Nakagima	(none)	Nakagima
Nominated (Commander)	Kaio; Kaik	Raphael	Solange	(none)	Nakagima	Whendy	(none)		Bruno	Bruno	(none)	(none)
Nominated (Explorers)	Solange	Caíque	Jaciara	(none)	Ste	Ste	(none)		Jaciara	Solange	(none)	(none)
Nakagima	Solange	Caíque	Jaciara	Not eligible	Raphael; Kaio	Exiled (Day 22)		Returned	Jaciara	Solange	Nominated	Winner (Day 46)
Kaik	Solange	Bruno	Fábio	Not eligible	Raphael	Caíque	Nominated	Not eligible	Nakagima	Solange	Nominated	Runner-up (Day 46)
Ste	Jaciara	Caíque	Jaciara	Not eligible	Raphael; Raphael	Caíque	Nominated	Not eligible	Jaciara	Solange	Nominated	Exiled (Day 43)
Bruno	Solange	Jaciara	Whendy	Not eligible	Ste	Ste	Nominated	Not eligible	Solange	Kaik	Nominated	Exiled (Day 43)
Solange	Fábio	Fábio	Jaciara	Exiled (Day 16)				Returned	Jaciara	Kaik	Re-Exiled (Day 40)	
Jaciara	Solange	Ste	Ste	Exiled (Day 16)				Returned	Solange	Re-Exiled (Day 34)		
Fábio	Solange	Caíque	Kaik	Not eligible	Kaik	Caíque	Nominated	Exiled (Day 31)				
Caíque	Ste	Whendy	Exiled (Day 10)	Returned	Ste	Ste	Nominated	Re-Exiled (Day 31)				
Raphael	Whendy	Whendy	Ste	Not eligible	Ste	Ste	Nominated	Exiled (Day 31)				
Whendy	Solange	Caíque	Jaciara	Not eligible	Ste	Ste	Exiled (Day 28)					
Kaio	Jaciara	Exiled (Day 4)		Returned	Ste	Re-Exiled (Day 22)						
Aline	Ste	Walked (Day 4)										
Vitória	Solange	Exiled (Day 3)										
Notes	1, 2, 3, 4	(none)	5, 6		7	(none)	8		(none)	9	10	11, 12
Voted into the Arena	Kaik; Kaio; Solange	Caíque; Raphael	Jaciara; Solange	Caíque; Kaio; Vitória	Nakagima & Kaio; Ste & Raphael	Ste; Whendy	Bruno; Caíque; Fábio; Kaik; Raphael; Ste	Jaciara; Kaio; Nakagima; Solange; Vitória; Whendy	Bruno; Jaciara	Bruno; Solange	Bruno; Kaik; Nakagima; Ste	Kaik; Nakagima
Walked	Aline	(none)										
Exiled	Vitória; Comanders' no choice in the twist	Caíque; Lost the Arena duel	Solange; Lost the Arena duel	Vitória; Lost the Arena duel	Nakagima; Kaio; Lost the Arena duel	Whendy; Lost the Arena duel	Raphael; Lost the Arena duel	Vitória; Lost the Arena duel	Jaciara; Lost the Arena duel	Solange; Lost the Arena duel	Bruno; Lost the Challenge	Kaik; Lost the Final Challenge
Exiled	Vitória; Comanders' no choice in the twist	Caíque; Lost the Arena duel	Solange; Lost the Arena duel	Vitória; Lost the Arena duel	Nakagima; Kaio; Lost the Arena duel	Whendy; Lost the Arena duel	Caíque; Lost the Arena duel	Kaio; Lost the Arena duel	Jaciara; Lost the Arena duel	Solange; Lost the Arena duel	Bruno; Lost the Challenge	Kaik; Lost the Final Challenge
Exiled	Kaio; Lost the Arena duel	Caíque; Lost the Arena duel	Jaciara; Lost the Arena duel	Vitória; Lost the Arena duel	Nakagima; Kaio; Lost the Arena duel	Whendy; Lost the Arena duel	Caíque; Lost the Arena duel	Kaio; Lost the Arena duel	Jaciara; Lost the Arena duel	Solange; Lost the Arena duel	Ste; Lost the Challenge	Kaik; Lost the Final Challenge
Exiled	Kaio; Lost the Arena duel	Caíque; Lost the Arena duel	Jaciara; Lost the Arena duel	Vitória; Lost the Arena duel	Nakagima; Kaio; Lost the Arena duel	Whendy; Lost the Arena duel	Fábio; Lost the Arena duel	Whendy; Lost the Arena duel	Jaciara; Lost the Arena duel	Solange; Lost the Arena duel	Ste; Lost the Challenge	Kaik; Lost the Final Challenge
Saved	Solange; Won the Arena duel	Raphael; Won the Arena duel	Caíque; Won the Arena duel		Ste; Raphael; Won the Arena duel	Ste; Won the Arena duel	Bruno; Won the Arena duel	Jaciara; Won the Arena duel	Bruno; Won the Arena duel	Bruno; Won the Arena duel	Kaik; Won the Challenge	Nakagima; Won the Final Challenge
Saved	Solange; Won the Arena duel	Raphael; Won the Arena duel	Caíque; Won the Arena duel		Ste; Raphael; Won the Arena duel	Ste; Won the Arena duel	Ste; Won the Arena duel	Nakagima; Won the Arena duel	Bruno; Won the Arena duel	Bruno; Won the Arena duel	Kaik; Won the Challenge	Nakagima; Won the Final Challenge
Saved	Kaik; Won the Arena duel	Raphael; Won the Arena duel	Kaio; Won the Arena duel		Ste; Raphael; Won the Arena duel	Ste; Won the Arena duel	Ste; Won the Arena duel	Nakagima; Won the Arena duel	Bruno; Won the Arena duel	Bruno; Won the Arena duel	Nakagima; Won the Challenge	Nakagima; Won the Final Challenge
Saved	Kaik; Won the Arena duel	Raphael; Won the Arena duel	Kaio; Won the Arena duel		Ste; Raphael; Won the Arena duel	Ste; Won the Arena duel	Kaik; Won the Arena duel	Solange; Won the Arena duel	Bruno; Won the Arena duel	Bruno; Won the Arena duel	Nakagima; Won the Challenge	Nakagima; Won the Final Challenge

==== Notes ====
- ^Note 1 : Due to was the only one not to be chosen by any crew, Vitória won immunity this cycle's nominations.
- ^Note 2 : The Winning Commander had to nominate two explorers (an Emerald Crew and an Amethyst Crew) during cycle's nominations. Caíque, as Winning Commander, nominated Kaio and Kaik into the Arena duel, respectively.
- ^Note 3 : After the Villa vote, Vitória used her the bottle that determined that because she had not to be chosen by any crew in this cycle, she was automatically exiled.
- ^Note 4 : On Day 4, Aline walked from the game for reasons undisclosed during the show.
- ^Note 5 : The explorers living in the Exile had to choose an explorer of the winning crew to be eligible to be nominated by all explorers from the Villa during the cycle's nominations. They chose Ste.
- ^Note 6 : The Arena duel, Caíque and Kaio won the duel, with both returning to the Villa as well and becoming the new Commanders in Cycle 4. As result, Solange and Jaciara, the explorers from the Villa nominated into the Arena duel, lost the challenge and were automatically exiled.
- ^Note 7 : The Winning Commander's nominee and the explorer most voted from the Villa, respectively, had the power to name an additional nominee each, who required to compete in pairs with their nominees in the Arena duel. Kaio, as Winning Commander, nominated Nakagima, who in turn nominated Kaio into the Arena duel. The explorers from the Villa nominated Ste, who in turn nominated Raphael into the Arena duel.
- ^Note 8 : The explorers competed in a Special Arena duel was done in pairs: Bruno & Jaciara, Caíque & Kaio, Fábio & Whendy, Kaik & Solange, Raphael & Vitória and Ste & Nakagima. Kaik & Solange won the duel, with Solange returning to the Villa as well and Kaik becoming the Winning Commander in Cycle 6. Ste & Nakagima was the second place and Bruno & Jaciara was the third place, with Nakagima and Jaciara returning to the Villa as well.
- ^Note 9 : The Winning Commander's nominee and the explorer most voted from the Villa, respectively, had the power to name an additional nominee each, who required to compete in pairs with their nominees in the Arena duel but the chosen one of the losing pair would not be exiled. However, they were only told of this fact after the Arena duel. Bruno, as Winning Commander's nominee, chose Nakagima, while Solange, who received the most votes from the Villa, chose Kaik.
- ^Note 10 : The final four explorers competed in an endurance challenge for a place in the Finale. The two final challenge losers would be automatically exiled. Bruno and Ste lost the challenge and were automatically exiled, meaning Kaik and Nakagima became the season's finalists.
- ^Note 11 : For their final treasure hunt at the Island, Kaik and Nakagima were both given a support crew of previously exiled explorers who won endurance challenge from the Exile. As Commanders, Kaik chose Solange, while Nakagima chose Fábio.
- ^Note 12 : For the final, the finalists competed in three rounds with the agility challenges. The final challenge winner would be whoever had the best total time in the challenges. However, host Rios revealed that the results would be delivered only during the live final. In the end, Nakagima won the final challenge against Kaik, who is second place, winning the competition.

=== Exiles' power ===
Cycle	Exiled(s)	Consequences
2	Vitória; Kaio	~~Ban three explorers from being the cycle's second Commander.~~ → ~~Caíque, Raphael, Solange~~
3	Vitória; Kaio; Caíque	~~Assemble the cycle's two crews and choose the crew's Commander opposing the saved explorer of the Arena duel.~~ → ~~Raphael, Solange, Nakagima, Fábio, Bruno (Amethyst Crew);~~ ~~Jaciara, Ste, Kaik, Whendy (Emerald Crew)~~
3	Vitória; Kaio; Caíque	Choose an explorer of the winning crew to be voted on by all explorers in the Villa. → Ste
4	Vitória; Solange; Jaciara	Assemble the cycle's two crews and choose to ban an explorer of the crew with more explorers from compete in the Crews' challenge (Nakagima). → Caíque, Kaik, Raphael, Ste (Emerald Crew); Kaio, Bruno, Fábio, Nakagima, Whendy (Amethyst Crew)
4	Vitória; Solange; Jaciara	Ban an explorer of the winning crew to participate of the Special Reward. → Whendy
5	Vitória; Solange; Jaciara; Nakagima; Kaio	Choose two explorers to determine by randow draw between to be the crew's Commander opposing the saved explorer of the Arena duel or to has a disadvantage for their crew in the Crews' challenge. → Fábio (crew's Commander); Kaik (disadvantage)
6	Vitória; Solange; Jaciara; Nakagima; Kaio; Whendy	Choose an exiled to participate of the Special Reward of the saved explorer of the Arena duel. → Vitória
6	Vitória; Kaio; Whendy; Raphael; Caíque; Fábio	Choose one of the six categories of the Vila's weekly activity (compass, puffer fish, parrot, castaway, masked and little wave) so that each chosen explorer wins R$3.000. If the total money amount is not distributed in the Vila's weekly activity, the remaining money amount would be distributed among the exiles. → Puffer fish
7	Vitória; Kaio; Whendy; Raphael; Caíque; Fábio; Jaciara	Ban an explorer from compete in the Crews' challenge, who in turn has to assemble the cycle's two crews and choose the crew's Commander opposing the saved explorer of the Arena duel. → Kaik Nakagima, Ste (Emerald Crew); Bruno, Solange (Amethyst Crew)

=== Crew status ===
	Cycle 1	Cycle 2		Cycle 3	Cycle 4	Cycle 5	Cycle 6	Cycle 7	Cycle 8
	Cycle 1	Round 1	Round 2	Cycle 3	Cycle 4	Cycle 5	Cycle 6	Cycle 7	Finale
Nakagima	Amethyst	Amethyst		Emerald	Emerald		Ste	Emerald	Fábio
Kaik	Amethyst	Amethyst		Emerald	Amethyst	Amethyst	Solange	No Crew	Solange
Ste	Emerald	~~Emerald~~	Amethyst	Emerald	Amethyst	Amethyst	Nakagima	Emerald	
Bruno	Emerald	Amethyst		Emerald	Emerald	Emerald	Jaciara	Amethyst	
Solange	Emerald	Emerald		Amethyst			Kaik	Amethyst	Kaik
Jaciara	Emerald	Amethyst		Amethyst			Bruno		
Fábio	Emerald	~~Amethyst~~	Emerald	Emerald	Emerald	Emerald	Whendy		Nakagima
Caíque	Amethyst	Emerald			Amethyst	Amethyst	Kaio		
Raphael	Amethyst	Emerald		Amethyst	Amethyst	Emerald	Vitória		
Whendy	Amethyst	Emerald		Amethyst	Emerald	Emerald	Fábio		
Kaio	Emerald				Emerald		Caíque		
Aline	Amethyst								
Vitória	No Crew						Raphael		

=== Public' favorite's results ===
Placing	Explorer	Percentage
1	Solange	49.82% to win
2	Ste	28.50% (out of 4)
3	Bruno	11.84% (out of 4)
4	Caíque	9.84% (out of 4)
5	Whendy	7.11% (out of 8)
6	Vitória	6.57% (out of 8)
7	Jaciara	4.96% (out of 8)
8	Kaio	4.18% (out of 8)
9	Kaik	3.86% (out of 12)
10	Fábio	2.84% (out of 12)
11	Raphael	2.56% (out of 12)
12	Nakagima	0.53% (out of 12)

== Ratings and reception ==
=== Brazilian ratings ===
All numbers are in points and provided by Kantar Ibope Media.

Cycle	First air date	Last air date	Timeslot (BRT)	Daily SP viewers (in points)						SP viewers (in points)	BR viewers (in points)	Ref.
Cycle	First air date	Last air date	Timeslot (BRT)	Mon	Tue	Wed	Thu	Fri	Sat	SP viewers (in points)	BR viewers (in points)	Ref.
1	July 18, 2022	July 23, 2022	Monday to Saturday; 10:45 p.m.	4.0	4.2	4.8	4.2	4.1	2.7	4.0	Outside top 10	
2	July 25, 2022	July 30, 2022	Monday to Saturday; 10:45 p.m.	4.0	3.3	4.7	3.9	4.3	2.6	3.8	Outside top 10	
3	August 1, 2022	August 6, 2022	Monday to Saturday; 10:45 p.m.	3.2	3.2	3.4	3.9	3.9	3.0	3.4	Outside top 10	
4	August 8, 2022	August 13, 2022	Monday to Saturday; 10:45 p.m.	3.3	2.9	3.8	3.5	3.4	2.3	3.2	Outside top 10	
5	August 15, 2022	August 20, 2022	Monday to Saturday; 10:45 p.m.	3.5	3.5	3.8	3.4	3.5	2.2	3.3	Outside top 10	
6	August 22, 2022	August 27, 2022	Monday to Saturday; 10:45 p.m.	3.4	3.3	4.3	3.3	3.2	2.2	3.3	Outside top 10	
7	August 29, 2022	September 3, 2022	Monday to Saturday; 10:45 p.m.	3.0	3.1	2.7	3.0	2.3	2.5	2.7	Outside top 10	
8	September 5, 2022	September 8, 2022	Monday to Saturday; 10:45 p.m.	3.5	3.0	3.7	3.8	—	—	3.5	Outside top 10	

- In 2022, each point represents 258.821 households in 15 market cities in Brazil (74.666 households in São Paulo).
