= Perdono =

Single by Tiziano Ferro

from the album Rosso relativo
- B-side: "Remix"
- Released: 12 May 2001
- Genre: R&B
- Length: 4:04
- Label: EMI
- Songwriter: Tiziano Ferro
- Producers: Alberto Salerno; Mara Maionchi

Tiziano Ferro singles chronology
"Perdono" (2001)	"L'olimpiade" (2002)

"Perdono" (Italian for 'Forgiveness'; also released under the title "Xdono") is the debut single by Italian singer Tiziano Ferro. The song was released on 12 May 2001 as the lead single from his debut studio album Rosso relativo, which was released four months later. The single achieved huge success in many European countries and topped the charts in the Netherlands, Spain, Italy, Austria and Belgium (Wallonia).

The song, considered as "sweet and melodious" in its Franco-Italian version, was much aired on radio in France. The music video was directed by Matteo Pellegrini.

The song was also released in English, Portuguese and Spanish language.

The record producer, Michele Canova, revealed after 21 years that Ferro's song featured samples from a song by American singer R. Kelly.

== Track listings ==
CD single

1. "Perdono" – 4:04
2. "Perdono (English) – 4:04

CD maxi

1. "Perdono" – 3:59
2. "Perdono" (English version) – 3:59
3. "Perdono" (remix) – 3:43
4. "Perdono" (bug version) – 1:45

CD maxi

1. "Xdono" – 3:58
2. "Xdono" (remix) – 3:43
3. "Xdono" (bug version) – 1:45

== Charts ==
=== Weekly charts ===
Chart (2001–02)	Peak position
Austria (Ö3 Austria Top 40)	2
Belgium (Ultratop 50 Flanders)	6
Belgium (Ultratop 50 Wallonia)	1
Croatia (HRT)	4
Denmark (Tracklisten)	3
France (SNEP)	6
Germany (GfK)	2
Greece (IFPI)	8
Italy (FIMI)	1
Netherlands (Dutch Top 40)	1
Netherlands (Single Top 100)	1
Norway (VG-lista)	11
Poland Airplay (Music & Media)	11
Poland (Polish Airplay Chart)	5
Spain (PROMUSICAE)	4
Sweden (Sverigetopplistan)	4
Switzerland (Schweizer Hitparade)	2

=== Year-end charts ===
Chart (2002)	Position
Austria (Ö3 Austria Top 40)	28
Belgium (Ultratop Flanders)	38
Belgium (Ultratop Wallonia)	6
Europe (Eurochart Hot 100)	16
France (SNEP)	24
Germany (Official German Charts)	7
Italy (FIMI)	2
Netherlands (Dutch Top 40)	25
Netherlands (Single Top 100)	13
Sweden (Sverigetopplistan)	41
Switzerland (Schweizer Hitparade)	7

== Certifications ==
Certifications for Perdono
Region	Certification	Certified units/sales
Belgium (BRMA)	Platinum	50,000^{*}
France (SNEP)	Gold	250,000^{*}
Germany (BVMI)	Gold	250,000^{^}
Italy (FIMI)	2× Platinum	100,000
Switzerland (IFPI Switzerland)	Gold	20,000^{^}
^{*} Sales figures based on certification alone.^{^} Shipments figures based on certification alone.
