= Rosso relativo (song) =

Single by Tiziano Ferro

from the album Rosso relativo
- Released: 7 June 2002
- Genre: R&B
- Length: 4:00
- Label: EMI
- Songwriter: Tiziano Ferro
- Producer: Michele Canova

Tiziano Ferro singles chronology
"Imbranato" (2002)	"Rosso relativo" (2002)	"Le cose che non dici" (2003)

"Rosso relativo" is a song by Italian singer Tiziano Ferro. It was released on 7 June 2002 as the fourth single from his debut studio album Rosso relativo. Although the lyrics seem to talk about sex, Ferro admitted that the real theme of the song is the conflictual relationship that he had with food – before becoming famous, the singer struggled with obesity.

== Formats and track listings ==
CDS - Rosso relativo (Italy)

1. Rosso relativo
2. Perdono (English version)
3. Perdono (French version)
4. Perdona (Spanish version)
5. Rosso relativo (Videoclip)

CDS - Rojo relativo (Spain)

1. Rojo relativo

CDS - Rosso relativo (Germany)

1. Rosso relativo (Italian album version)
2. Rosso relativo (Signatibet Remix)
3. Rosso relativo (Ghost production dance remix)

CDS - Rosso relativo (France)

1. Rosso relativo (Italian version)
2. Rosso relativo (French version)

CDS - Rosso relativo (Mexico)

1. Rojo Relativo
2. Rojo Relativo (Remix 1)
3. Rojo Relativo (Remix 2)
4. Rojo Relativo (Remix 3)

CDS - Promo Mexico & Video (Mexico)

1. Perdona
2. Alucinado
3. Rojo relativo
4. Las cosas que no dices
5. Perverso (Spanish version)
6. Alucinado (Italian version)
7. Perverso (Italian version)

Download digital

1. Rosso relativo (Italian version)
2. Rojo relativo (Spanish version)
3. Romance relativo (Portuguese version)

== Charts ==
=== Peak positions ===
Chart (2002)	Peak position
Belgium (Ultratop 50 Flanders)	55
Belgium (Ultratop 50 Wallonia)	45
Croatia (HRT)	9
France (SNEP)	61
Germany (GfK)	49
Italy (FIMI)	11
Spain (Promusicae)	14
Switzerland (Schweizer Hitparade)	36
