= Ilha Record =

Brazilian reality television show

- Genre: Reality competition
- Directed by: Rodrigo Carelli
- Presented by: Sabrina Sato (2021); Mariana Rios (2022)
- Country of origin: Brazil
- Original language: Portuguese
- No. of seasons: 2
- No. of episodes: 86

Production
- Production locations: Paraty, Rio de Janeiro
- Camera setup: Multiple-camera
- Running time: 15–60 minutes

Original release
- Network: RecordTV
- Release: July 26, 2021 – September 8, 2022

Ilha Record (English: Record Island) was a Brazilian reality competition format originally created and aired by RecordTV. The series premiered on Monday, July 26, 2021 at 10:30 p.m. / 9:30 p.m. (BRT / AMT).

The show features a group of celebrities, known as Explorers, living together on a desert island and competing against each other in extreme challenges to avoid being exiled and continue their quest for lost treasures and the grand prize of R$500.000. Prior to the live finale, a public vote is held to determine who would become the season's Favorite Explorer and win the special prize of R$250.000.

== Season chronology ==
Season	Number of explorers	Number of weeks	Finalists		Public' favorite's	Vote
Season	Number of explorers	Number of weeks	Winner	Runner-up	Public' favorite's	Vote
1	13	7	Any Borges	Pyong Lee	Mirella Santos	79.33% (out of 2)
2	13	8	Nakagima	Kaik Pereira	Solange Gomes	49.82% (out of 4)

== Ratings ==
Season	Timeslot (BRT)	Episodes	Premiered		Ended		TV season	SP viewers (in points)	Source
Season	Timeslot (BRT)	Episodes	Date	Viewers (in points)	Date	Viewers (in points)	TV season	SP viewers (in points)	Source
1	Mon–Sat 10:30 p.m.	40	July 26, 2021	8.0	September 9, 2021	7.8	2021	7.04	
2	Mon–Sat 10:45 p.m.	42	July 18, 2022	4.0	September 8, 2022	3.8	2022	3.40	

- Each point represents a specific number of households in São Paulo.
  - 2021: 76.577 households.
  - 2022: 74.666 households.
