= Imbranato =

Single by Tiziano Ferro

from the album Rosso relativo
- B-side: "Imbranato (French version)"
- Released: 18 January 2002
- Genre: R&B; pop; trip hop
- Length: 5:03
- Label: EMI Music
- Songwriter: Tiziano Ferro
- Producers: Alberto Salerno; Mara Maionchi

Tiziano Ferro singles chronology
"L'olimpiade" (2002)	"Imbranato" (2002)	"Rosso relativo" (2003)

"Imbranato" is a song by Italian singer Tiziano Ferro. It was released on 18 January 2002 as the third single from his debut studio album Rosso relativo. The song achieved a huge success in Italy, Switzerland, Belgium, Austria, France, Spain and Mexico. A spanish version of the song, titled Alucinado, was released inn Spain and in Latin, which reached the top in the Mexican and Spanish singles chart.

== Track listing ==
1. Imbranato (Italian version)
2. Imbranato (French version)

== Charts ==
=== Weekly charts ===
Chart (2002)	Peak position
Austria (Ö3 Austria Top 40)	44
Belgium (Ultratop 50 Flanders)	32
Belgium (Ultratop 50 Wallonia)	6
France (SNEP)	31
Germany (GfK)	52
Netherlands (Single Top 100)	85
Switzerland (Schweizer Hitparade)	29
U.S. Billboard Latin Tropical/Salsa Airplay	5
U.S. Billboard Latin Pop Airplay	3
U.S. Billboard Hot Latin Songs	4

=== Year-end charts ===
Chart (2002)	Position
Belgium (Ultratop Wallonia)	45
Switzerland (Schweizer Hitparade)	92
