= Mariana Rios =

Brazilian actress and singer (born 1985)

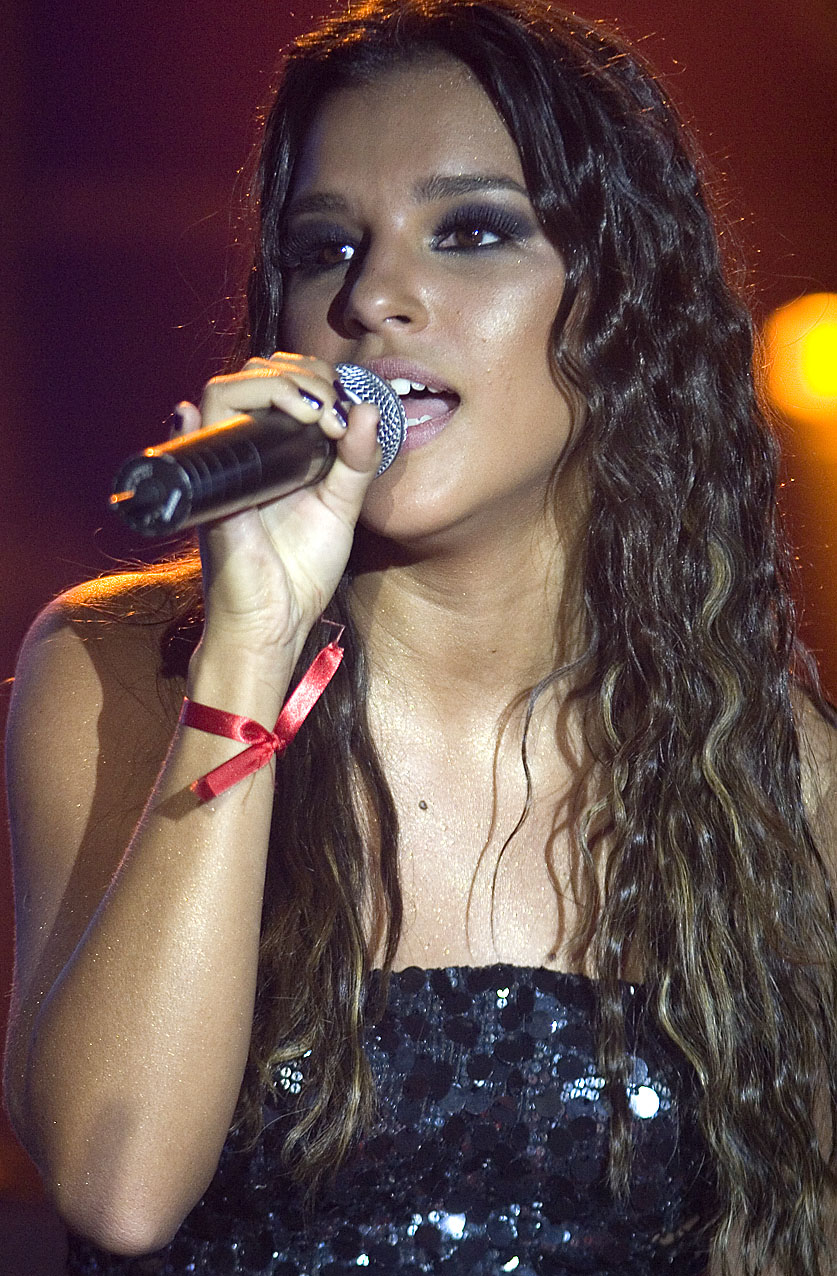
- Rios at the Canecão in 2009
- Born: Mariana Rios Botelho; 4 July 1985 (age 41); Araxá, Minas Gerais, Brazil
- Occupations: Actress, singer
- Years active: 2002–present
- Height: 1.66 m (5 ft 5 in)

Mariana Rios Botelho (born 4 July 1985) is a Brazilian actress and singer-songwriter.

== Biography ==
Rios began singing at age seven. To begin her career, she moved to Uberaba, where she played several gigs with local bar bands. She participated in music festivals and was hired by a studio to sing jingles. At 15 she moved to Rio de Janeiro and graduated in Casa de Arte das Laranjeiras. Before joining the cast of the telenovela Malhação, she participated in two musicals with Oswaldo Montenegro.

In 2008, she joined the cast of the telenovela Malhação as Yasmin, a 17-year-old girl whose parents are often absent and try to compensate this by buying her expensive gifts. Due to the success of Yasmin, Rios made the cover of the August 2008 magazine Capricho (1051 edition). Mariana lives alone in Rio de Janeiro since she turned 18 years old. She has a relationship with the vocalist of the band NX Zero, Di Ferrero. She played the character Nancy in the 2010 Rede Globo telenovela Araguaia.

In 2015, Rios will play Elphaba in the Brazilian production of Wicked.

== Career ==
Movie
Year	Title	Character	Note
2011	Não Se Preocupe, Nada Vai Dar Certo	Rosa	
2012	Totalmente Inocentes	Gildinha	
2012	The Lorax	Audrey	Dubbing
2015	Órfãos do Eldorado	Claudia	
2017	My Little Pony	Tempest Shadow	Dubbing

Television
Year	Title	Character	Note
2002	Fama	Participant	Seasons 1
2007–09	Malhação	Yasmin Fontes / Blue Spencer	Seasons 15–16
2010	Araguaia	Nancy Santos	
2012	Salve Jorge	Adriana Sampaio Alencar (Drika)	
2013	Além do Horizonte	Celina Machado	
2015–16	Superbonita	News Reporter	
2015–16	Se Arrume Comigo	Presenter	
2016	Totalmente Demais	Herself	Episode: "April 9, 2016"
2016	The Voice Brasil	Presenter (Backstage)	Season 5
2017	Popstar	Contestant	Season 1
2018	O Sétimo Guardião		
2021	Show dos Famosos	Contestant	
2022–24	Back to 15	Luiza Rocha	
2022	Ilha Record	Presenter	Season 2
2023	A Grande Conquista	Presenter	

== Discography ==
=== Studio Album ===
Year	Album
2009	Mariana Rios

=== Singles ===
Year	Single	Charts		Album
Year	Single	BRA Hot 100	BRA Year End	Album
2008	"Amar é Assim Mesmo"	32	—	Malhação 2008
2009	"Incendeia"	27	—	Malhação 2009
2009	"Insônia"	50	—	Mariana Rios
2015	"Reach Me"	—	—	Second studio album

== Awards and nominations ==
Year	Award	Nomination	Result
2008	Prêmio Extra de TV	Best newcomer actress	Nominated
2008	Best of the year: Domingão do Faustão	Best newcomer actress	Won
2009	Capricho Awards	Best Brazilian actress	Won
