= Mara Maionchi =

Italian record producer (born 1941)

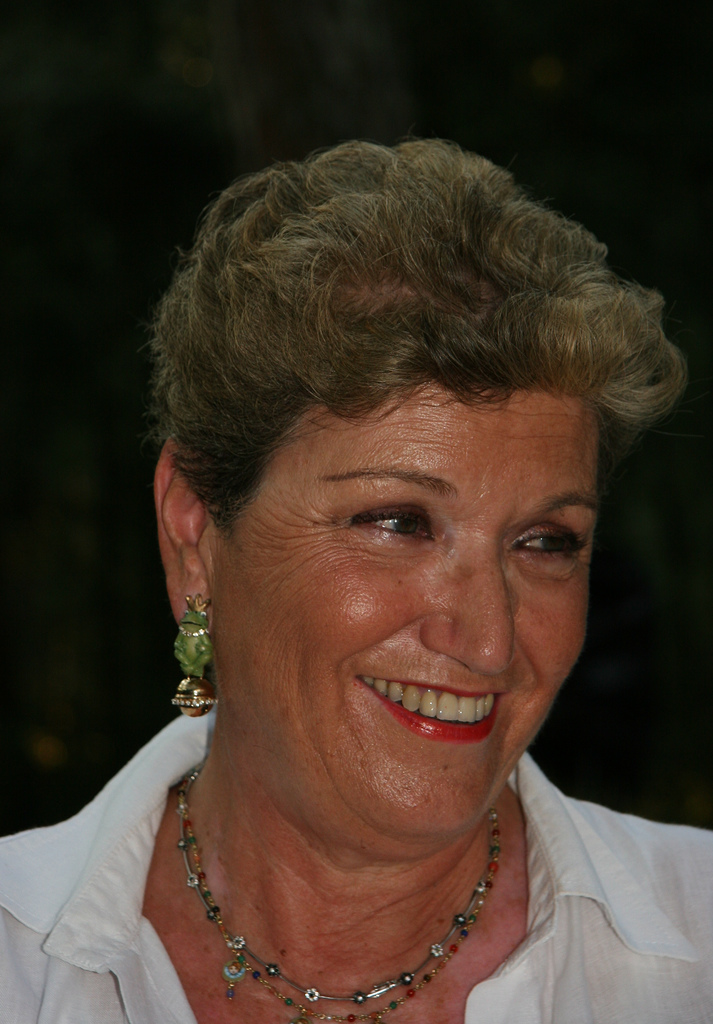
- Maionchi in 2008
- Born: 22 April 1941 (age 85); Bologna, Kingdom of Italy
- Occupations: Record producer; television personality; talent agent
- Spouse: Alberto Salerno (m. 1976)
- Children: Giulia (born 1977); Camilla (born 1981)

Mara Maionchi (pronounced [ˈmaːra maˈjoŋki]; born 22 April 1941) is an Italian record producer and television personality.

== Early life and career ==
Maionchi was born on 22 April 1941 in Bologna. She began her career in 1967 as secretary in the Ariston Records press office, working with Ornella Vanoni and Mino Reitano. She is married with Alberto Salerno (son of Nicola Salerno, songwriter of hits like Torero, Tu vuò fà l'americano, Guaglione, Non ho l'età, and Un ragazzo di strada) and has two daughters Giulia and Camilla, who are her press officers.

In 1969, Maionchi reached the Numero Uno, record label founded by Mogol and Lucio Battisti. The experience with the pair of authors led her in the 1970s to the Dischi Ricordi, where she became a talent discoverer of singers like Gianna Nannini. Later, she became art director, following the musical path of Fabrizio De André and helped to popularize Mango.

== Later career ==
In the 1990s, Maionchi met Tiziano Ferro in SanremoLab academy and produced his first three albums. Completing the experience with the Nisa, she founded with her husband and the daughters the record label Non ho l'età, with the aim of promoting new musical talents. In 2008, she became X Factor judge on Rai 2, with Morgan and Simona Ventura. In year-end she hosts with Francesco Facchinetti on the same channel Saturday show Scalo 76. In 2009, she was confirmed for the second and the third series, with the same judges, and for the third series with Morgan and Claudia Mori. In 2010, she was in the fourth edition with three new judges: Elio, Enrico Ruggeri and Anna Tatangelo. She also released a dance single called Fantastic that peaked at No. 2 in the Italian Singles Chart. She was confirmed for her participation at the talent show Amici di Maria De Filippi in 2011. Maionchi did not return for the fifth edition of X Factor in 2011 and was replaced by Arisa. In 2012, she became jury president of Videofestival live, a showcase for new talents whose finality is broadcast every year by Canale Italia. In 2013, she became a leader in the fourth edition of the talent show Io canto, with Claudio Cecchetto and Flavia Cercato.

In 2014, Maionchi began acting as a radio broadcaster in the program Benvenuti nella giungla on Radio 105, with Gianluigi Paragone. In the same year, she returned to X Factor for the eighth edition, not as a judge but as the lead player of the Xtra Factor talk show on Sky Uno. She also played the same role for ninth and tenth edition of X Factor. On 19 May 2017, her participation was announced for the 11th edition of X Factor, again in the role of a judge. She became the winning for the first time in season 11 with Lorenzo Licitra from the over 25s category and again for the second time in season 12 with Anastasio from the boys category. In 2021, Maionchi hosted together with Fedez the Italian program LOL – Chi ride è fuori. In 2023, Maionchi began her work as the Italian TV commentator for the Eurovision Song Contest alongside Gabriele Corsi.

== Filmography ==
=== Films ===
Year	Title	Role	Notes
2010	The Santa Claus Gang	Giovanni's mother-in-law	Feature film debut as an actress
2013	Gli Squallors	Herself	Documentary film
2017	Coco	Mamà Coco (voice)	Italian voice-over role

=== Television ===
Year	Title	Role	Notes
2008–2010; 2017–2019	X Factor	Judge	Talent show (seasons 1–4; 11–13)
2008–2009	Scalo 76	Host	Variety show
2010	Let's dance	Contestant	Talent show (season 1)
2011–2013	Amici di Maria De Filippi	Music teacher, judge	Talent show (seasons 11–13)
2012, 2016	Castrocaro Music Festival	Judge	Annual music festival
2013	Io canto	Coach	Talent show (season 4)
2015–2016	Il processo del lunedì	Regular guest	Talk show
2017	Celebrity MasterChef Italia	Contestant	Cooking contest (7th place)
2018	Sanremo Young	Judge	Talent show (season 1)
2018	Murders at Barlume	Hairdresser	Recurring role; 3 episodes
2018	Il Supplente	Herself	Episode: "Episode 1"
2019–present	Italia's Got Talent	Judge	Talent show (seasons 9–present)
2021	LOL – Chi ride è fuori	Co-host	Reality show
2021	Venus Club	Regular guest	Talk show
2022	Nudi per la vita	Host	Reality show
2022–present	Quelle brave ragazze	Herself	Docu-reality
