= Annalisa discography =

Discography of Italian singer-songwriter Annalisa

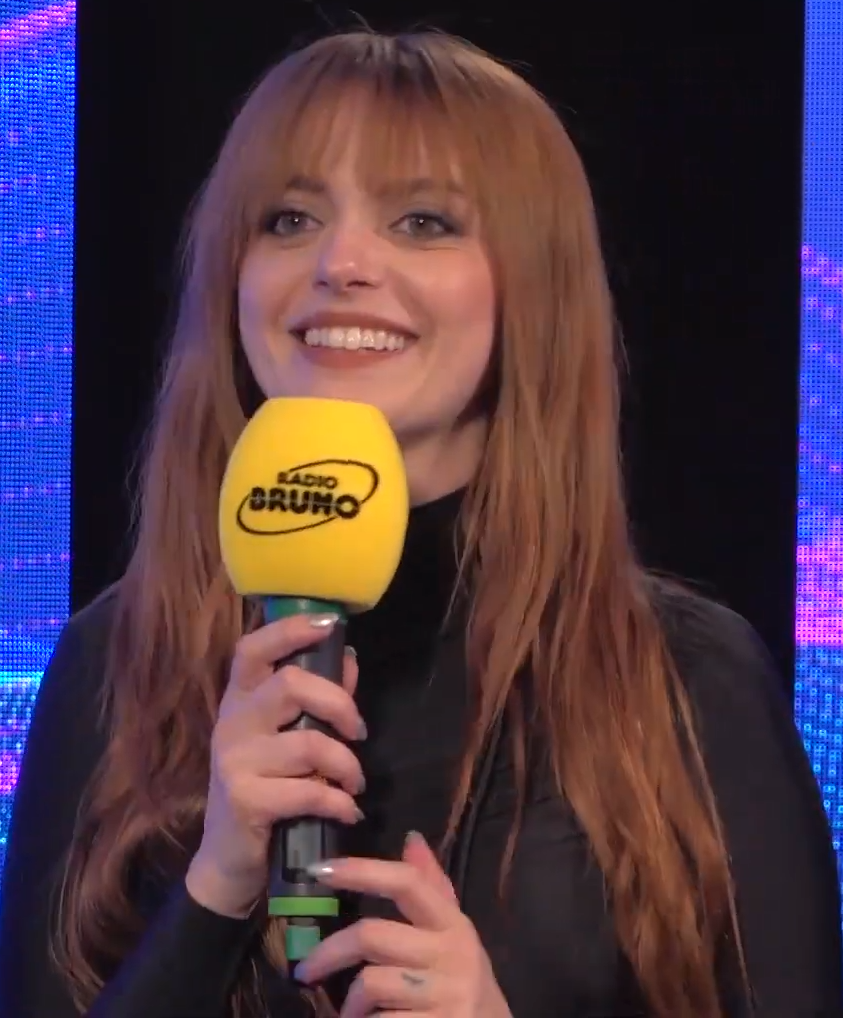
- Annalisa in 2023
- Studio albums: 9
- Singles: 36

The discography of Italian singer-songwriter Annalisa consists of nine studio albums and 36 singles as the primary artist. She has topped the Italian music charts on four occasions—twice with a single and twice with a studio album—and has earned numerous certifications from the FIMI, selling over five million records in Italy alone.

Annalisa has received 53 platinum and 12 gold certifications from FIMI.

== Studio albums ==
List of studio albums, with chart positions and certifications
Title	Details	Peak chart positions		Certifications
Title	Details	ITA	SWI	Certifications
Nali	Released: 4 March 2011; Label: Warner Music Italy; Format: CD, digital download	2	—	FIMI: Platinum
Mentre tutto cambia	Released: 27 March 2012; Label: Warner Music Italy; Format: CD, digital download	9	—	
Non so ballare	Released: 14 February 2013; Label: Warner Music Italy; Format: CD, digital download	6	—	
Splende	Released: 13 February 2015; Label: Warner Music Italy; Format: CD, digital download	7	—	FIMI: Gold
Se avessi un cuore	Released: 20 May 2016; Label: Warner Music Italy; Format: CD, digital download	4	91	
Bye Bye	Released: 16 February 2018; Label: Warner Music Italy; Format: CD, LP, digital download	2	92	FIMI: Platinum
Nuda	Released: 18 September 2020; Label: Warner Music Italy; Format: CD, LP, digital download	2	—	FIMI: Platinum
E poi siamo finiti nel vortice	Released: 29 September 2023; Label: Warner Music Italy; Format: CD, LP, digital download	1	42	FIMI: 4× Platinum
Ma io sono fuoco	Released: 10 October 2025; Label: Warner Music Italy; Format: CD, LP, digital download	1	—	FIMI: Platinum

== Singles ==
=== As lead artist ===
List of singles as lead artist, with selected chart positions, showing year released and album name
Title	Year	Peak chart positions					Certifications	Album
Title	Year	ITA	BUL	POL	SWI	WW	Certifications	Album
"Diamante lei e luce lui"	2011	9	—	—	—	—	FIMI: Gold	Nali
"Giorno per giorno"	2011	—	—	—	—	—		Nali
"Senza riserva"	2012	8	—	—	—	—	FIMI: Platinum	Mentre tutto cambia
"Tra due minuti è primavera"	2012	—	—	—	—	—		Mentre tutto cambia
"Per una notte o per sempre"	2012	—	—	—	—	—		Mentre tutto cambia
"Pirati"	2013	78	—	—	—	—		Non-album single
"Scintille"	2013	14	—	—	—	—		Non so ballare
"Alice e il blu"	2013	79	—	—	—	—		Non so ballare
"A modo mio amo"	2013	—	—	—	—	—		Non so ballare
"Sento solo il presente"	2014	7	—	—	—	—	FIMI: Gold	Splende
"L'ultimo addio"	2014	27	—	—	—	—	FIMI: Gold	Splende
"Una finestra tra le stelle"	2015	5	—	—	—	—	FIMI: Platinum	Splende
"Vincerò"	2015	52	—	—	—	—	FIMI: Gold	Splende
"Splende"	2015	24	—	—	—	—	FIMI: Gold	Splende
"Il diluvio universale"	2016	25	—	—	—	—		Se avessi un cuore
"Se avessi un cuore"	2016	50	—	—	—	—	FIMI: Gold	Se avessi un cuore
"Used to You / Potrei abituarmi"	2016	—	—	—	—	—		Se avessi un cuore
"Direzione la vita"	2017	43	—	—	—	—	FIMI: Platinum	Bye Bye
"Il mondo prima di te"	2018	3	—	—	71	—	FIMI: Platinum	Bye Bye
"Bye Bye"	2018	41	—	—	—	—	FIMI: Platinum	Bye Bye
"Un domani" (featuring Mr. Rain)	2018	36	—	—	—	—	FIMI: Platinum	Bye Bye
"Avocado Toast"	2019	—	—	—	—	—		Non-album single
"Vento sulla luna" (featuring Rkomi)	2019	74	—	—	—	—		Nuda
"Houseparty"	2020	73	—	—	—	—	FIMI: Gold	Nuda
"Tsunami"	2020	83	—	—	—	—	FIMI: Gold	Nuda
"Dieci"	2021	7	—	—	—	—	FIMI: 2× Platinum	Nuda10
"Movimento lento" (featuring Federico Rossi)	2021	8	10	—	—	—	FIMI: 3× Platinum	Nuda10
"Eva + Eva" (featuring Rose Villain)	2021	—	—	—	—	—		Nuda10
"Tropicana" (with Boomdabash)	2022	3	—	—	70	—	FIMI: 4× Platinum	Venduti
"Bellissima"	2022	7	—	—	96	—	FIMI: 5× Platinum	E poi siamo finiti nel vortice
"Mon amour"	2023	1	—	—	—	—	FIMI: 6× Platinum	E poi siamo finiti nel vortice
"Disco Paradise" (with Fedez and Articolo 31)	2023	3	—	42	88	—	FIMI: 5× Platinum; ZPAV: Gold	Non-album single
"Ragazza sola"	2023	21	—	—	—	—	FIMI: Platinum	E poi siamo finiti nel vortice
"Euforia"	2023	19	—	—	—	—	FIMI: Platinum	E poi siamo finiti nel vortice
"Christmas (Baby Please Come Home)" (Note: "Christmas (Baby Please Come Home)" is included on the Amazon Music Edition of E poi siamo finiti nel vortice.)	2023	10	—	—	—	—	FIMI: Gold	E poi siamo finiti nel vortice
"Sinceramente" (Note: "Sinceramente" is included on the Sanremo Edition of E poi siamo finiti nel vortice.)	2024	2	—	—	6	95	FIMI: 4× Platinum	E poi siamo finiti nel vortice
"Storie brevi" (with Tananai)	2024	2	—	—	—	—	FIMI: 3× Platinum	CalmoCobra / E poi siamo finiti nel vortice
"Maschio"	2025	9	—	—	—	—	FIMI: Platinum	Ma io sono fuoco
"Piazza San Marco" (featuring Marco Mengoni)	2025	10	—	—	—	—	FIMI: Gold	Ma io sono fuoco
"Esibizionista"	2025	3	—	—	—	—	FIMI: Platinum	Ma io sono fuoco
"Canzone estiva"	2026	34	—	—	—	—	FIMI: Gold	Ma io sono fuoco: Platinum Edition
"Amica" (with Madame)	2026	24	—	—	—	—		Ma io sono fuoco: Platinum Edition
"—" denotes a single that did not chart or was not released.

=== As featured artist ===
List of singles as featured artist, with selected chart positions, showing year released and album name
Title	Year	Peak chart positions		Certifications	Album
Title	Year	ITA	SWI	Certifications	Album
"Dimenticare (mai)" (Raige featuring Annalisa)	2014	74	—	FIMI: Gold	Non-album single
"Stella cadente" (Rocco Hunt featuring Annalisa)	2016	—	—	FIMI: Gold	SignorHunt: Wake Up Edition
"Tutto per una ragione" (Benji & Fede featuring Annalisa)	2017	9	—	FIMI: 3× Platinum	0+
"Je me souviens de tout" (Sara'h featuring Annalisa)	2018	—	—		Non-album single
"Supercalifragili" (J-Ax featuring Annalisa)	2020	84	—		ReAle
"San Lorenzo" (Alfa featuring Annalisa)	2020	53	—	FIMI: Platinum	Nord
"Jingle Bell Rock" (Achille Lauro featuring Annalisa)	2020	—	—		1920 - Achille Lauro & The Untouchable Band
"Istinto animale" (Don Joe featuring Guè, Annalisa and Ernia)	2024	29	—		Non-album single
"Beatrice" (Tedua featuring Annalisa)	2024	1	—	FIMI: 2× Platinum	La Divina Commedia (Deluxe)
"—" denotes a recording that did not chart or was not released in that territory.

== Other charted songs ==
List of charting songs that were never released as singles, showing year released and album name
Title	Year	Peak chart positions	Certifications	Album or EP
Title	Year	ITA	Certifications	Album or EP
"Inverno"	2011	40		Nali
"Questo bellissimo gioco"	2011	5		Nali
"Brividi"	2011	46		Nali
"Solo"	2011	59		Nali
"Mi sei scoppiato dentro al cuore"	2012	54		Nali
"It's Oh So Quiet"	2012	61		Amici: prima puntata
"Ma che freddo fa"	2012	81		Amici: terza puntata
"Why"	2012	73		Amici: quarta puntata
"Non so ballare"	2013	44		Non so ballare
"Ferire per amare" (Moreno featuring Annalisa)	2014	77		Incredibile
"FuckTheNoia" (Fedez featuring Annalisa)	2019	31		Paranoia Airlines
"Sweet Dreams" (Achille Lauro featuring Annalisa)	2020	33	FIMI: Gold	1990
"Memories" (Capo Plaza featuring Annalisa)	2024	23		Ferite
"Amica"	2025	93		Ma io sono fuoco
"Sbalzi d'amore" (Rose Villain featuring Annalisa)	2025	71		Radio Vega (After Dark)
"—" denotes a recording that did not chart or was not released in that territory.

== Guest appearances ==
List of non-single guest appearances, with other performing artists, showing year released and album name
Title	Year	Other performer(s)	Album
"Amici mai"	2013	Antonello Venditti	Io, l'orchestra, le donne e l'amore
"Ogni volta"	2013	Antonello Venditti	Io, l'orchestra, le donne e l'amore
"Ferire per amare"	2014	Moreno	Incredibile
"Si me olvidas"	2015	Vanesa Martín	Directo: Gira Crónica de un baile
"Abbracciati"	2015	Marcella Bella	Una serata... Bella per te, Gianni!
"La mia storia tra le dita"	2016	Gianluca Grignani	Una strada in mezzo al cielo
"Mila a Shiro due cuori nella pallavolo"	2017	Cristina D'Avena	Duets - Tutti cantano Cristina
"FuckTheNoia"	2019	Fedez	Paranoia Airlines
"Io ti volevo"	2020	Marco Masini	Masini +1 30th Anniversary
"Sweet Dreams"	2020	Achille Lauro	1990
"Neve su Marte"	2022	Mr. Rain	Fragile
"Salto nel buio"	2024	Stabber, Coez	Trueno

== Music videos ==
Title	Year	Director(s)	Ref.
"Diamante lei e luce lui"	2011	Marco Salom & Serena Corvaglia	
"Senza riserva"	2012		
"Scintille"	2013		
"Alice e il blu"	2013		
"Sento solo il presente"	2014		
"L'ultimo addio"	2014		
"Una finestra tra le stelle"	2015	Gaetano Morbioli	
"Splende"	2015	Gaetano Morbioli	
"Il diluvio universale"	2016	Gaetano Morbioli	
"Se avessi un cuore"	2016	Gaetano Morbioli	
"Used to You"	2016	Claudio Zagarini	
"Tutto per una ragione"	2017	The Astronauts	
"Direzione la vita"	2017	Mauro Russo	
"Il mondo prima di te"	2018	Antonio Usbergo & Niccolò Celaia	
"Bye Bye"	2018	Antonio Usbergo & Niccolò Celaia	
"Un domani"	2018	Enea Colombi	
"Avocado Toast"	2019	Nicola Corradino	
"Vento sulla luna"	2019	Enea Colombi	
"Houseparty"	2020	Davide Bastolla	
"Tsunami"	2020	Giacomo Triglia	
"Dieci"	2021	Giacomo Triglia	
"Movimento lento"	2021	Mauro Russo	
"Eva+Eva"	2021	Simone Peluso	
"Tropicana"	2022	Fabrizio Conte	
"Bellissima"	2022	Giulio Rosati	
"Mon amour"	2023	Giulio Rosati	
"Disco Paradise"	2023	Olmo Parenti	
"Ragazza sola"	2023	Giulio Rosati	
"Euforia"	2023	Dario Garegnani	
"Sinceramente"	2024	Giulio Rosati	
"Istinto animale"	2024	Fabrizio Conte	
"Storie brevi"	2024	Bendo	
"Beatrice"	2024	Martina Pastori	
"Maschio"	2025	Giulio Rosati	
"Piazza San Marco"	2025	Nicolò Bassetto	
"Esibizionista"	2025	Byron Rosero	

== Songwriting credits ==
List of songs written or co-written by Annalisa
Title	Year	Artist	Album
"Siamo amore" (Annalisa, Diego Calvetti and Marco Ciappelli)	2014	Giada	Da capo
"Every Second I'm Away" (Annalisa, Tony Hadley and Marco Ciappelli)	2015	Tony Hadley	The Christmas Album
"L'ultimo latin lover" (Annalisa, Francesco Bianconi and Gianna Nannini)	2017	Gianna Nannini	Amore gigante
