= OGAE =

Fan organization

Organisation Générale des Amateurs de l'Eurovision
- Abbreviation: OGAE
- Formation: 1984
- Type: NGO, NP, NPO
- Location: Savonlinna, Finland
- Coordinates: 61°52′5″N 028°53′10″E
- Region served: 42 countries (see list below)
- President: Simon Bennett
- Secretary: Anthony Cigé
- Treasurer: Morten Thomassen
- Other Members: Alasdair Rendall (Board Member); Marcus Davey (Board Member); Sebastian Zasada (Board Member); Stéphane Chiffre (Board Member)
- Website: www.ogaeinternational.org

The Organisation Générale des Amateurs de l'Eurovision (pronounced [ɔʁɡanizɑsjɔ̃ ʒeneʁal dez‿amatœʁ də løʁovizjɔ̃]; French for 'General Organisation of Eurovision Fans'), shortened to OGAE, is a non-governmental and non-profit international organisation, consisting of 42 Eurovision Song Contest fan clubs from across Europe and worldwide. It was founded in 1984 in Savonlinna, Finland by Jaripekka Koikkalainen.

Four non-profit competitions are organised by the OGAE every year to promote national popular music to Eurovision fans around the world. The organisation also works frequently in co-operation with the European Broadcasting Union (EBU) and national broadcasters from the participating countries in order to help promote the Eurovision Song Contest.

The current president of the OGAE International Network is Simon Bennett from OGAE United Kingdom, who succeeded Maiken Mäemets of OGAE Finland in 2015.

== History ==
The Eurovision Song Contest began in 1956, and in 1984 the OGAE International Network was founded by Jaripekka Koikkalainen in Savonlinna, Finland. The organisation, which is an independent Eurovision fan club, operates as a non-governmental, non-political and non-profit body, and works frequently in cooperation with the European Broadcasting Union (EBU). The network is open to countries that take part in the Eurovision Song Contest or have participated in the past. Several other countries around Europe and beyond that do not have their own independent OGAE Network, including Monaco, San Marino, Kazakhstan, South Africa, and the United States of America, participate in the organization under the "Rest of the World" title.

Every year, the organisation arranges two competitions, the OGAE Second Chance Contest, and the OGAE Song Contest. The cooperative exercise of the OGAE Network is to raise awareness of popular national music across the world, in collaboration with the fans of the Eurovision Song Contest, as well as establishing a strong relationship between national broadcasting companies and the marketing of the Eurovision Song Contest itself to a wider fan-base.

In 2007, Antonis Karatzikos was elected as new International Coordinator for the OGAE, until 2009. In July 2009 he was re-elected for the same post. In 2011, OGAE International Network became a registered organisation in France, and Maiken Mäemets was elected president. She was re-elected for a second term on 17 May 2013 at the Euro Fan Café (Moriska Paviljongen) in Malmö, Sweden. During the annual OGAE Presidents’ Meeting, which took place on 22 May 2015 at the Euro Fan Café in Vienna, the presidents of the OGAE Clubs elected a new board for the OGAE International Network (shown below), who would maintain their roles until the next election in 2017.

Position	Name	OGAE club
President	Simon Bennett	United Kingdom
Secretary	Anthony Cigé	Iceland
Treasurer	Morten Thomassen	Norway
Board members	Alasdair Rendall	United Kingdom
Board members	Marcus Davey	Australia (ROW)
Board members	Sebastian Zasada	Poland
Board members	Stéphane Chiffre	France

== OGAE branches ==
OGAE currently has forty-four members, including two in Germany. These are:

- Albania
- Andorra
- Armenia
- Australia
- Austria
- Azerbaijan
- Belarus
- Belgium
- Bulgaria
- Croatia
- Cyprus
- Czech Republic
- Denmark
- Estonia
- Finland
- France
- Germany
- Germany Eurovision Club
- Greece
- Hungary
- Iceland
- Ireland
- Israel
- Italy
- Latvia
- Lithuania
- Luxembourg
- Malta
- Netherlands
- North Macedonia
- Norway
- Poland
- Portugal
- Rest of the World
- Romania
- Russia
- Serbia
- Slovenia
- Spain
- Sweden
- Switzerland
- Turkey
- Ukraine
- United Kingdom

=== OGAE Rest of the World ===
Countries that do not have an OGAE Network in their own right, but are active or associate members of the EBU are unified under the name "Rest of the World". The countries which constitute this OGAE Network are:

- Afghanistan
- Algeria
- Argentina
- Bosnia and Herzegovina^{2}
- Botswana
- Brazil
- Canada
- Chile
- China
- Colombia
- Costa Rica
- Eswatini
- Egypt
- Georgia^{2}
- Hong Kong
- Japan
- Jordan
- Kazakhstan
- Kyrgyzstan
- Lebanon
- Lesotho
- Liechtenstein
- Mexico
- Moldova^{2}
- Monaco^{2}
- Montenegro^{2}
- Morocco^{2}
- Namibia
- New Zealand
- Peru
- San Marino^{2}
- Seychelles
- Slovakia^{2}
- South Africa
- South Korea
- Tunisia
- United Arab Emirates
- United States of America
- Uzbekistan
- Venezuela

Notes
2. Has participated in the Eurovision Song Contest, though does not have full OGAE membership and thus part of OGAE Rest of the World.

== OGAE contests ==
=== OGAE Poll ===
Every year since 2007, the OGAE has conducted a pre-Eurovision Song Contest poll in which every national club plus OGAE Rest of the World casts a vote from all entries participating in a particular contest, using the same scoring system as the one at Eurovision: the most voted songs on each club receive 1 to 8, and then 10 and 12 points, and countries cannot vote for themselves.

Winners and runners-up of the OGAE Poll
Year	Winner	Song	Artist	Second place	Third place
2007	Serbia	"Molitva" (Молитва)	Marija Šerifović	Belarus	Switzerland
2008	Sweden	"Hero"	Charlotte Perrelli	Switzerland	Serbia
2009	Norway	"Fairytale"	Alexander Rybak	France	Sweden
2010	Denmark	"In a Moment like This"	Chanée and N'evergreen	Israel	Germany
2011	Hungary	"What About My Dreams?"	Kati Wolf	France	United Kingdom
2012	Sweden	"Euphoria"	Loreen	Italy	Iceland
2013	Denmark	"Only Teardrops"	Emmelie de Forest	San Marino	Norway
2014	Sweden	"Undo"	Sanna Nielsen	Hungary	Israel
2015	Italy	"Grande amore"	Il Volo	Sweden	Estonia
2016	France	"J'ai cherché"	Amir	Russia	Australia
2017	Italy	"Occidentali's Karma"	Francesco Gabbani	Belgium	Sweden
2018	Israel	"Toy"	Netta	France	Finland
2019	Italy	"Soldi"	Mahmood	Switzerland	Netherlands
2020	Lithuania	"On Fire"	The Roop	Iceland	Switzerland
2021	Malta	"Je me casse"	Destiny	Switzerland	France
2022	Sweden	"Hold Me Closer"	Cornelia Jakobs	Italy	Spain
2023	Sweden	"Tattoo"	Loreen	Finland	France
2024	Croatia	"Rim Tim Tagi Dim"	Baby Lasagna	Italy	Switzerland
2025	Sweden	"Bara bada bastu"	KAJ	Austria	Netherlands
2026	Finland	"Liekinheitin"	Linda Lampenius and Pete Parkkonen	Denmark	Australia

Table key
First place
Second place
Third place
Failed to qualify
Contest cancelled

==== Marcel Bezençon Fan Award ====
The Marcel Bezençon Fan Award was handed out in 2002 and 2003, and voted on by members of the OGAE. It was discontinued and replaced by the Composer Award in 2004.

Recipients of the Marcel Bezençon Fan Award
Year	Winner	Song	Artist
2002	Finland	"Addicted to You"	Laura Voutilainen
2003	Spain	"Dime"	Beth

=== OGAE Second Chance Contest ===
The OGAE Second Chance Contest is a visual event organised by branches of OGAE. It began in 1987, when it was then known as "Europe's Favourite". Four OGAE branches competed in the first contest, coming from the Netherlands, Norway, Sweden and the United Kingdom. The contest quickly expanded and now usually contains around 20 countries competing each year. Due to the countries' varying Eurovision selection methods over the years, it is a common occurrence for countries to sporadically compete in the contest. The competition was previously a non-televised event, but evolved over the years by the usage of videotape and later DVD, YouTube and streaming services.

The contest takes place in the summer after the year's Eurovision Song Contest. A video entry from each branch of OGAE is handed to each competing OGAE club. The votes are then returned to the organising OGAE branch, normally the previous year's winning branch, who then organises the final. The method of voting has developed since the contests interception, from audio-tape in the contest's beginnings to the use of video tape and nowadays by DVD and YouTube.

Previously it had been known for non-televised national final entries to compete in the Second Chance Contest. This occurred from 1989 to 1991 when Spain entered songs known to have been entered into the country's internal selection process. In 1990, 1991, 1998 and 1999 Italy competed in the Second Chance Contest, entering the winning songs of the Italian Sanremo Music Festival, known to be the basis for the creation of the Eurovision Song Contest. After 1999, a new rule was introduced allowing only songs from televised national finals to compete in the Second Chance Contest. This has led to some branches becoming ineligible to compete for many years due to no national final being held in the country. Since 1993, guest juries have been used in the voting of the contest. These juries are composed of branches that are ineligible to compete in the contest due to no national final being held in their country. In 2024, Annalisa joined Alcazar as the only artists to win the contest twice.

Winners and runners-up of the OGAE Second Chance Contest
Year	Host city	Participants	Winner	Artist	Song	Points	Second place	Third place
1987	(Netherlands) Huizen	8	Sweden	Arja Saijonmaa	"Högt över havet"	24	Netherlands; Norway	No third place awarded
1988	(Sweden) Östersund	10	Sweden	Lena Philipsson	"Om igen"	63	Finland	Netherlands
1989	(Sweden) Östersund	9	Denmark	Lecia Jønsson	"Landet Camelot"	72	Sweden	Germany
1990	(Sweden) Östersund	13	Sweden	Carola	"Mitt i ett äventyr"	119	Italy	Germany
1991	(Sweden) Östersund	15	Sweden	Pernilla Wahlgren	"Tvillingsjäl"	106	Greece	Israel
1992	(Germany) Montabaur	11	Norway	Wenche Myhre	"Du skal få din dag i morgen"	78	Israel	Ireland
1993	(Norway) Oslo	22	Norway	Merethe Trøan	"Din egen stjerne"	188	Netherlands	United Kingdom
1994	(Norway) Oslo	16	Sweden	Gladys Del Pilar	"Det vackraste jag vet"	176	United Kingdom	Norway
1995	(Sweden) Örebro	9	Sweden	Cecilia Vennersten	"Det vackraste"	129	United Kingdom	Ireland
1996	(Sweden) Farsta	22	Sweden	Lotta Engberg	"Juliette & Jonathan"	152	Croatia	Germany
1997	(Germany) Hanover	17	Italy	Anna Oxa	"Storie"	165	Ireland	Germany
1998	(Germany) Hamburg	18	Netherlands	Nurlaila	"Alsof je bij me bent"	192	Sweden	Norway
1999	(Netherlands) Emmen	16	Turkey	Feryal Başel	"Unuttuğumu Sandığım Anda"	164	Belgium	Germany
2000	(Turkey) Istanbul	21	Finland	Anna Eriksson	"Oot voimani mun"	177	United Kingdom	Spain
2001	(Finland) Helsinki	20	Sweden	Barbados	"Allt som jag ser"	252	Spain	United Kingdom
2002	(Sweden) Stockholm	18	Spain	David Bisbal	"Corazón latino"	203	Sweden	Israel
2003	(Spain) Las Palmas	19	Sweden	Alcazar	"Not a Sinner Nor a Saint"	215	Slovenia	Austria
2004	(Sweden) Växjö	21	Spain	Davinia	"Mi obsesión"	192	Sweden	Germany
2005	(Spain) Bilbao	23	Sweden	Alcazar	"Alcastar"	201	Serbia and Montenegro	Slovenia
2006	(Sweden) Stockholm	19	Slovenia	Saša Lendero	"Mandoline"	201	Norway	Sweden
2007	(Slovenia) Ljubljana	20	Sweden	Måns Zelmerlöw	"Cara Mia"	252	United Kingdom	Spain
2008	(Sweden) Stockholm	21	Sweden	Sanna Nielsen	"Empty Room"	268	Spain	Poland
2009	(Sweden) Stockholm	20	Denmark	Hera Björk	"Someday"	257	Sweden	Spain
2010	(Denmark) Copenhagen	22	Sweden	Timoteij	"Kom"	267	Denmark	Portugal
2011	(Sweden) Gothenburg	21	Iceland (Note: Indicates representative of OGAE Rest of the World.)	Yohanna	"Nótt"	224	Sweden	Italy
2012	(South Africa) Johannesburg	19	Spain	Pastora Soler	"Tu vida es tu vida"	201	Sweden	Norway
2013	(Spain) Barcelona	15	Norway	Adelén	"Bombo"	151	Italy	Hungary^{[RoW]}
2014	(Norway) Oslo	20	Sweden	Helena Paparizou	"Survivor"	259	Spain	Portugal
2015	(Sweden) Stockholm	18	Italy	Nek	"Fatti avanti amore"	305	Sweden	Denmark
2016	(Italy) Siena	23	Poland	Margaret	"Cool Me Down"	277	Sweden	Israel
2017	(Poland) Warsaw	22	Sweden	Mariette	"A Million Years"	329	Italy	Ukraine
2018	(Sweden) Eskilstuna	27	Italy	Annalisa	"Il mondo prima di te"	350	France	Finland
2019	(Italy) Udine	24	France	Seemone	"Tous les deux"	294	Italy	Sweden
2020	(France) Paris/Lille/Limoges	22	Sweden	Anna Bergendahl	"Kingdom Come"	344	Finland	Italy
2021	(Sweden) Stockholm	14	Norway	Keiino	"Monument"	441	Sweden	Italy
2022	(Norway) Oslo	27	Sweden	Medina	"In i dimman"	316	Finland	Spain
2023	(Sweden) Eskilstuna	23	Sweden	Marcus & Martinus	"Air"	322	Norway	Finland
2024	(Sweden) Borås	16	Italy	Annalisa	“Sinceramente"	364	Sweden	Norway
2025	(Italy) Florence	25	Sweden	Klara Hammarström	"On and On and On"	348	Italy	Finland
2026	(Sweden) Älmhult	22	Italy	Ditonellapiaga	"Che fastidio!"	318	Ukraine	Denmark

==== Retrospective Second Chance Contest ====
From 2003 it was decided to hold Retrospective Contests each year containing songs from contests prior to 1987. In 2003 the first contest was held, containing songs that failed to compete in the Eurovision Song Contest 1986. This format is repeated every year, for example in 2004 the 1985 Retrospective contest was held, in 2005 the 1984 contest was held, etc.

Winners and runners-up of the OGAE Retrospective Second Chance Contest
Year	Host city	Participants	Winner	Song	Artist	Points	Second place	Third place
1966	N/A	9	Italy	"Nessuno mi può giudicare"	Caterina Caselli	214	Portugal	Sweden
1967	N/A	7	Luxembourg	"Le soleil a quitté ma maison"	Vicky Leandros	193	United Kingdom	Finland
1968	N/A	8	United Kingdom	"Wonderful World"	Cliff Richard	263	Ireland	Sweden
1969	N/A	10	Spain	"Amigos, amigos"	Salomé	231	United Kingdom	Sweden
1970	N/A	7	Ireland	"Things You Hear About Me"	Maxi, Dick and Twink	245	United Kingdom	Spain
1971	N/A	11	Italy	"Che sarà"	Ricchi e Poveri	296	United Kingdom	Germany
1972	N/A	11	Italy	"Montagne verdi"	Marcella Bella	308	Germany	Finland
1973	(United Kingdom) Brighton	12	Sweden	"Ring Ring (Bara du slog en signal)"	Björn, Benny, Agnetha & Anni-Frid	282	Spain	United Kingdom
1974	(United Kingdom) Brighton	11	United Kingdom	"Have Love, Will Travel"	Olivia Newton-John	277	France	Luxembourg
1975	(United Kingdom) Brighton	11	Germany	"Er gehört zu mir"	Marianne Rosenberg	264	Sweden	Portugal
1976	(United Kingdom) Brighton	14	Luxembourg	"Tout peut arriver au cinéma"	Marianne Rosenberg	212	United Kingdom	France
1977	(United Kingdom) Brighton	10	France	"Vis ta vie"	Patricia Lavila	275	United Kingdom	Belgium
1978	(United Kingdom) Brighton	14	United Kingdom	"Lonely Nights"	Ronnie France	226	Israel	Denmark
1979	(United Kingdom) Brighton	13	Germany	"Vogel der Nacht"	Paola	188	Greece	Israel
1980	(United Kingdom) Brighton	12	United Kingdom	"Happy Everything"	Maggie Moone	289	Germany	France
1981	(United Kingdom) Brighton	16	United Kingdom	"Don't Panic"	Liquid Gold	248	Sweden	Netherlands
1982	(United Kingdom) Brighton	15	Netherlands	"Fantasie eiland"	The Millionaires	204	United Kingdom	Germany
1983	(United Kingdom) Brighton	15	Germany	"Viva La Mamma"	Ingrid Peters and July Paul	204	Denmark	Israel
1984	(United Kingdom) Brighton	15	Belgium	"Merci à la vie"	Formule II	160	Sweden	Denmark
1985	(United Kingdom) Brighton	12	Denmark	"Ved du hva' du sku'"	Trax	170	United Kingdom	Israel
1986	(United Kingdom) London	13	Netherlands	"Fata Morgana"	DeeDee	123	Iceland	Denmark

==== Guest Jury Hits ====
The Guest Jury Hits contest was introduced in 2003, giving guest juries of the Retro contests the opportunity to compete in their own contest. The contest was formed as a way for OGAE branches to become juries in the Second Chance Retro Contest, with each non-competing branch selecting a hit song from their country in that year. The first contest was held in 2003, when hit songs from 1985 competed in the contest. So far eighteen contests have been held, with Italy winning eight contests, the United States winning twice, and Australia, Belgium, Germany, Spain, Sweden, the Ukrainian Soviet Socialist Republic, and Jamaica each winning once. Umberto Tozzi has so far been responsible for three of Italy's wins.

Winners and runners-up of the OGAE Guest Jury Hits Contest
Year	Winner	Song	Artist	Runner-up
1966	France	"La bohème"	Charles Aznavour	Rest of the World; United States
1967	Australia	"To Love Somebody"	Bee Gees	Italy
1968	Germany	"Illusionen"	Alexandra	Spain
1969	Italy	"Una ragione di più"	Ornella Vanoni	Austria
1970	Rest of the World; United States	"Bridge over Troubled Water"	Simon & Garfunkel	Italy
1971	France	"Pour un flirt"	Michel Fugain	Rest of the World; United States
1972	France	"Une Belle Histoire"	Michel Fugain	Spain
1973	Italy	"Minuetto"	Mia Martini	Greece
1974	Rest of the World; Jamaica	"Kung Fu Fighting"	Carl Douglas	Spain
1975	Rest of the World; United States	"Only Yesterday"	The Carpenters	Ireland
1976	Sweden	"Fernando"	ABBA	Rest of the World; United States
1977	Italy	"Ti amo"	Umberto Tozzi	Austria
1978	Spain	"Vivir asi es morir de amor"	Camilo Sesto	Italy
1979	Italy	"Gloria"	Umberto Tozzi	Rest of the World; United States
1980	Italy	"Stella stai"	Umberto Tozzi	Cyprus
1981	Italy	"Sarà perché ti amo"	Ricchi e Poveri	Spain
1982	Italy	"Storie di tutti i giorni"	Riccardo Fogli	France
1983	Italy	"Sarà quel che sarà"	Tiziana Rivale	Ukrainian SSR
1984	Ukrainian SSR	"Oy zelene zhito zelene"	Oksana Bilozir	Greece
1985	Belgium	"Vergeet Barbara"	Will Tura	SR Serbia

=== OGAE Song Contest ===
The OGAE Song Contest is an audio event in which all OGAE national clubs can enter with an original song released in the previous 12 months in their countries. The competing songs must be sung in one of the country's official languages. This rule was planned to be removed in 2022, before the event was cancelled that year due to the controversy surrounding OGAE Russia's continued participation and the decision by OGAE not to remove the Russian OGAE club from the contest for its support of the Russian invasion of Ukraine.

==== Participation ====
So far 60 countries have been represented at the contest at least once. These are listed here alongside the year in which they made their debut:

Year	Country making its debut entry
1986	Finland, Germany, Netherlands, Norway, Sweden
1987	Botswana (as Rest of the World), Israel, Portugal, Spain, Zimbabwe (as Rest of the World)
1988	Belgium, Greece, United Kingdom
1989	Denmark, France
1990	Austria, Cyprus, Ireland, Italy
1991	Bulgaria, Monaco
1992	Luxembourg
1993	Japan (as Rest of the World), Slovakia, Switzerland
1994	South Africa (as Rest of the World), Turkey
1996	Australia
1997	New Zealand (as Rest of the World)
1998	Poland
1999	Croatia, Federal Republic of Yugoslavia, Kazakhstan (as Rest of the World)
2000	Iceland, Malta, Slovenia
2001	Bosnia and Herzegovina, Russia
2002	North Macedonia (Note: Until 2018 participated as F.Y.R. Macedonia.)
2003	Lithuania, Serbia and Montenegro
2005	Estonia, Lebanon
2006	Albania, Andorra, Armenia, Serbia, Ukraine
2008	Azerbaijan, Canada (as Rest of the World)
2009	Guyana (as Rest of the World)
2011	United States (as Rest of the World)
2012	Mexico (as Rest of the World)
2013	Colombia (as Rest of the World), Belarus
2014	Montenegro
2015	Latvia
2016	Czech Republic, Hungary
2025	Romania

OGAE Rest of the World represents countries that do not have an OGAE branch of their own. Their first participations came at the 1987 contest, where they represented Botswana & Zimbabwe.

==== Winners ====
Fourteen countries have won the contest since it began in 1986. The most successful country in the contest is the United Kingdom, which has won the contest eight times.

Winners of the OGAE Song Contest
Year	Host city	Winner	Song	Artist	Points	No. of entries
1986	(Finland) Savonlinna	Germany	"Stimmen in Wind"	Juliane Werding	16	5
1987	(Finland) Savonlinna	Israel	"Ba'ati Eleiha" (באתי אליך)	Yardena Arazi	83	10
1988	(United Kingdom) Cardiff	Germany	"Explosion"	Mary Roos	83	10
1989	(Germany) Berlin	Norway	"Hjem"	Karoline Krüger and Anita Skorgan	93	13
1990	(Norway) Oslo	Italy	"Vattene amore"	Mietta and Amedeo Minghi	136	18
1991	(Italy) Pisa	France	"Désenchantée"	Mylène Farmer	151	17
1992	(France) Paris	Portugal	"Se o dia nascesse"	Nucha	115	16
1993	(France) Montargis	Italy	"La solitudine"	Laura Pausini	154	20
1994	(Italy) Pisa	Greece	"Ftes" (Φταις)	Sabrina	116	19
1995	(Greece) Athens	Spain	"Cada vez"	Paloma San Basilio	144	21
1996	(Spain) Las Palmas de Gran Canaria	Spain	"Me quedaré solo"	Amistades Peligrosas	159	16
1997	(Spain) Las Palmas de Gran Canaria	Spain	"Amor perdido"	Marta Sánchez	199	22
1998	(Spain) Las Palmas de Gran Canaria	Poland	"Im Wiecej Ciebie tym mniej"	Natalia Kukulska	125	16
1999	(Greece) Athens	France	"Jardin de lumière"	Leyla Doriane	169	24
2000	(France) Paris	Sweden	"Svarta änkan"	Nanne	168	26
2001	(Sweden) Umeå	France	"Moi... Lolita"	Alizée	189	24
2002	(France) Paris	United Kingdom	"What If"	Kate Winslet	126	25
2003	(United Kingdom) Southampton	France	"Cassé"	Nolwenn Leroy	183	27
2004	(France) Lyon	Russia	"Gryozy" (Грёзы)	Varvara	178	27
2005	(Russia) Moscow	Italy	"Da grande"	Alexia	164	28
2006	(Italy) Pisa	Greece	"Mambo"	Elena Paparizou	244	30
2007	(Greece) Athens	Spain	"Qué no daría yo"	Rebeca	179	29
2008	(Spain) Zaragoza	Croatia	"Ruža u kamenu"	Franka Batelić	164	27
2009	(Croatia) Zagreb	United Kingdom	"Viva la Vida"	Coldplay	248	30
2010	(United Kingdom) London	United Kingdom	"Heartbreak (Make Me a Dancer)"	Freemasons feat. Sophie Ellis-Bextor	228	27
2011	(United Kingdom) London	United Kingdom	"Someone Like You"	Adele	189	26
2012	(United Kingdom) London	Italy	"Per sempre"	Nina Zilli	219	26
2013	(Italy) Bologna	Spain	"Te despertaré"	Pastora Soler	237	30
2014	Spain	France	"Dernière danse"	Indila	251	26
2015	(France) Paris	France	"Andalouse"	Kendji Girac	248	31
2016	(France) Paris	Spain	"Sofia"	Álvaro Soler	234	28
2017	Spain	Australia	"Fighting for Love"	Dami Im	232	28
2018	(Australia) Sydney	United Kingdom	"Scared of the Dark"	Steps	230	29
2019	(United Kingdom) London	United Kingdom	"Someone You Loved"	Lewis Capaldi	241	28
2020	(United Kingdom) Edinburgh	United Kingdom	"Physical"	Dua Lipa	213	28
2021	(United Kingdom) Cardiff	Australia	"Fly Away"	Tones and I	172	29
2022	Event cancelled					
2023	(Australia) Canberra	United Kingdom	"As It Was"	Harry Styles	255	31
2024	(United Kingdom) Belfast	Italy	"Euforia"	Annalisa	197	24
2025	(Italy) Turin	Italy	"Born with a Broken Heart"	Damiano David	279	29
2026	(Italy) Syracuse	Italy	"Esibizionista"	Annalisa	209	27

=== OGAE Video Contest ===
The OGAE Video Contest is a video event which, much like the OGAE Song Contest, is organised between branches of the OGAE. All OGAE national clubs can enter with an original song and video released in the previous 12 months in their countries. There is no obligation on the entry for the OGAE Video Contest to be sung in one of the country's official languages.

==== Participation ====
So far 51 countries have been represented at the contest at least once. These are listed here alongside the year in which they made their debut:

Year	Country making its debut entry
2003	Albania, Armenia, Bosnia and Herzegovina, Finland, France, Germany, Greece, Iceland, Israel, Italy, North Macedonia, Malta, Netherlands, Norway, Portugal, Russia, Slovenia, Spain, Turkey, United Kingdom
2004	Bulgaria, Croatia, Luxembourg, Serbia and Montenegro
2005	Ireland, Kazakhstan (as Rest of the World), Poland, Ukraine
2006	Moldova, Serbia, South Africa (as Rest of the World)
2007	Andorra, Austria, Estonia, Latvia, Namibia (as Rest of the World)
2010	Australia (as Rest of the World)
2012	Belgium, United States (as Rest of the World)
2013	Belarus, South Korea (as Rest of the World)
2014	Azerbaijan, Montenegro, Slovakia
2016	Cyprus, Czech Republic, Hungary, Romania, Sweden, Switzerland, Uzbekistan (as Rest of the World)

OGAE Rest of the World represents countries that do not have an OGAE branch of their own. Their first participation came at the 2005 contest, where they represented Kazakhstan.

==== Winners ====
Nine countries have won the contest since it began in 2003. The most successful country in the contest has been France, who has won the contest four times. As of 2026, the last OGAE Video Contest was held in 2021.

Winners of the OGAE Video Contest
Year	Country	Video	Artist	Points	Host city
2003	France	"Fan"	Pascal Obispo	122	(Turkey) Istanbul
2004	Portugal	"Cavaleiro Monge"	Mariza	133	(France) Fontainebleau
2005	Ukraine	"I Will Forget You"	Svetlana Loboda	171	(Portugal) Lisbon
2006	Italy	"Contromano"	Nek	106	(Turkey) İzmir
2007	Russia	"LML"	Via Gra	198	(Italy) Florence
2008	Russia	"Potselui"	Via Gra	140	(Russia) Moscow
2009	Russia	"Karma"	Yin-Yang	142	(Russia) Saint Petersburg
2010	Poland	"Kim tu jestem"	Justyna Steczkowska	85	(Russia) Volgograd
2011	France	"Lonely Lisa"	Mylène Farmer	96	(Poland) Wrocław
2012	Italy	"È l'amore che conta"	Giorgia	135	(France) Paris
2013	Belgium	"Papaoutai"	Stromae	144	(Italy) Turin
2014	France	"Tourner dans le vide"	Indila	141	(Belgium) Brussels
2015	Germany	"Gäa"	Oonagh	122	(France) Paris
2016	United Kingdom	"Hymn for the Weekend"	Coldplay	673	(Germany) Lüneburg
2017	Belgium	"Mud Blood"	Loïc Nottet	184	(United Kingdom) London
2018	Czech Republic	"Me Gusta"	Mikolas Josef	132	(Belgium) Antwerp
2019	Ukraine	"Siren Song"	Maruv	174	(Czech Republic) Prague
2020	Sweden	"Fingers Crossed"	Agnes	157	(Ukraine) Kyiv
2021	France	"Nous"	Julien Doré	165	(Sweden) Stockholm
2022–present	Event not held				
