= Sinceramente (song) =

2024 single by Italian singer Annalisa

Single by Annalisa

from the album E poi siamo finiti nel vortice
- Released: 7 February 2024
- Genre: Dance pop
- Length: 3:35
- Label: Warner Music Italy
- Songwriters: Annalisa Scarrone; Paolo Antonacci; Davide Simonetta; Stefano Tognini
- Producers: Davide Simonetta; Zef

Annalisa singles chronology
| "Christmas (Baby Please Come Home)" (2023) | "Sinceramente" (2024) | "Istinto animale" (2024) |

Music video
- "Sinceramente" on YouTube

"Sinceramente" (Italian pronunciation: [sintʃeraˈmente]; transl. "Sincerely") is a song co-written and recorded by Italian singer-songwriter Annalisa. It was released on 7 February 2024 through Warner Music Italy, and was included in the digital re-issue of her eighth studio album, E poi siamo finiti nel vortice.

The song competed in the 74th Sanremo Music Festival, Italy's musical festival which doubles also as a selection of the act for Eurovision Song Contest, where it placed third in the grand final.

A bilingual French-Italian version featuring Olivia Stone was released on 22 March 2024. On 29 March 2024, Bob Sinclar released an official remix version of the song. On 28 June 2024, the Spanish version of the song was released and sent to Spanish radio stations.

== Composition ==
The song was written by the singer herself with Paolo Antonacci and Davide Simonetta, a producer of the song with Zef. In an interview for Donna Moderna, Annalisa explained the meaning of the song and its conception:

"It is a song about freedom to be: in every manifestation, in every passage of life, in every state of mind. Free even to complain and be understood, rather than being judged or considered hysterical. ... It is a reflection born one night when I was not sleeping, as often happens to me, and I had this urgency to say, to tell. I felt the need to be understood, welcomed, listened to without prejudice."

== Critical reception ==
Andrea Laffranchi of Corriere della Sera described the song as a "pop anthem to female freedom", associating the sounds with Kylie Minogue's "Can't Get You Out of My Head", which "however, does not border on vintage references". Silvia Danielli of Billboard Italia also referred to the song as a prosecution in "wanting to reclaim a path of personal freedom and independence" through 1980s sounds. Patrizio Ruviglioni of Esquire Italia wrote that the song comes across with "straight bass drum" and "a kind of space age pop" reminiscent of Norwegian singer Aurora, and with "surprisingly long lyrics".

Vanity Fair Italia reported that although the song is "less immediate" than "Mon amour" and "Bellissima", it comes across as "undoubtedly cool" in which she "sings about freedom: about taking herself seriously, being ambitious, crying, complaining and rejoicing." In a less positive review, Fabio Fiume of All Music Italia wrote that the singer "could have dared more", since although he appreciates her vocal ability, it comes across as "nothing different beyond a song that works, playing with dance settings" in line with previous productions.

== Music video ==
The music video for the song, directed by Giulio Rosati, was released on 7 February 2024 through the singer's YouTube channel. The alter egos portrayed by the singer in the videos of "Bellissima", "Mon amour", and "Ragazza sola" appear in the video.

== Charts ==
=== Weekly charts ===
Weekly chart performance for "Sinceramente"
| Chart (2024) | Peak position |
|---|---|
| Global 200 (Billboard) | 95 |
| Italy (FIMI) | 2 |
| Italy Airplay (EarOne) | 1 |
| Lithuania Airplay (TopHit) | 85 |
| Romania (Romanian record charts) | 14 |
| Spain Airplay (PROMUSICAE) | 5 |
| Switzerland (Schweizer Hitparade) | 6 |

=== Year-end charts ===
2024 year-end chart performance for "Sinceramente"
| Chart (2024) | Position |
|---|---|
| Italy (FIMI) | 4 |

== Certifications ==
Certifications for "Sinceramente"
| Region | Certification | Certified units/sales |
|---|---|---|
| Italy (FIMI) | 4× Platinum | 400,000^{‡} |
^{‡} Sales+streaming figures based on certification alone.

== Release history ==
Release dates and formats for "Sinceramente"
| Region | Date | Format(s) | Version(s) | Label(s) | Ref. |
|---|---|---|---|---|---|
| Various | February 7, 2024 | Digital download; streaming | Original | Warner | |
| Italy | February 7, 2024 | Radio airplay | Original | Warner Italy | |
| Various | March 22, 2024 | Digital download; streaming | French Version | Warner | |
| Various | March 29, 2024 | Digital download; streaming | Bob Sinclar Remix | Warner | |
| Various | June 28, 2024 | Digital download; streaming | Spanish Version | Warner | |
| Spain | June 28, 2024 | Radio airplay | Spanish Version | Warner Music Spain | |
