= Ragazza sola =

2023 single by Italian singer Annalisa

Single by Annalisa

from the album E poi siamo finiti nel vortice
- Released: 8 September 2023
- Genre: Pop
- Length: 3:19
- Label: Warner Music Italy
- Songwriters: Annalisa Scarrone; Alessandro Raina; Davide Simonetta
- Producer: Davide Simonetta

Annalisa singles chronology
"Disco Paradise" (2023)	"Ragazza sola" (2023)	"Euforia" (2023)

Music video
- "Ragazza sola" on YouTube

"Ragazza sola" (Italian for 'Lone girl') is a song co-written and recorded by Italian singer-songwriter Annalisa. It was released on 8 September 2023 through Warner Music Italy as the third single from her eighth studio album E poi siamo finiti nel vortice.

The song peaked at number 21 on the Italian singles chart, and debuted on to top the Italian airplay chart.

== Background and composition ==
The song was written by Annalisa, Alessandro Raina and Davide Simonetta, who also produced the song. Annalisa described the song as the third chapter of the narrative explored in the previous two singles "Bellissima" and "Mon amour", summarising the song's lyrical content as "that moment in which you begin to embrace change", and that "the images flow in the mind like in a vortex, one after the other, disorderly, fast". She highlighted "Ragazza sola" as the resolution of this disorder, with the vortex having led her to a place of self-discovery in which she no longer felt alone.

== Critics reception ==
Alessandro Alicandri of TV Sorrisi e Canzoni reported that the song "embraces the consciousness of Bellissima and Mon amour" yet finds it "classic" in its lyrical theme and with a rhythm that "controls the pathos of the theme and still makes it fresh and in its own way fun". Alicandri stressed that the most interesting aspect of the song are the singer's singing talents highlighted more than in previous tracks, a factor that "historical fans were longing to find again" and that make the single "much more personal and experienced". Fabio Fiume of All Music Italia also wrote that Ragazza sola is able to "reunite her from an exquisitely vocal point of view with the Annalisa of the past", thanks to "beautiful long notes, sounds full of echoes and fascinating emphasizations" placed on an "electronic structure, ... minimal".

Francesco Raiola of Fanpage.it wrote that like the previous singles, the lyrics "retrace the road of loneliness" and there is "repetition play" in the hook, although it turns out to be "more intimate, with the singer's voice simply resting on the piano throughout the first verse" and then becoming a "rhythmic" track. Claudio Fabretti of Ondarock described "Ragazza sola" as "a song with a more fragile and pensive mood" more similar to Annalisa's early career, finding it "definitely less studied for the charts."

== Music video ==
A music video to accompany the release of "Ragazza sola", directed by Giulio Rosati, was released onto YouTube on the same day. The video was shot inside Le Roi Music Hall in Turin.

== Charts ==
Weekly chart performance for "Ragazza sola"
Chart (2023)	Peak position
Italy (FIMI)	21
Italy Airplay (EarOne)	1

== Certifications ==
Region	Certification	Certified units/sales
Italy (FIMI)	Platinum	100,000^{‡}
^{‡} Sales+streaming figures based on certification alone.
