= Annalisa =

Italian singer-songwriter (born 1985)

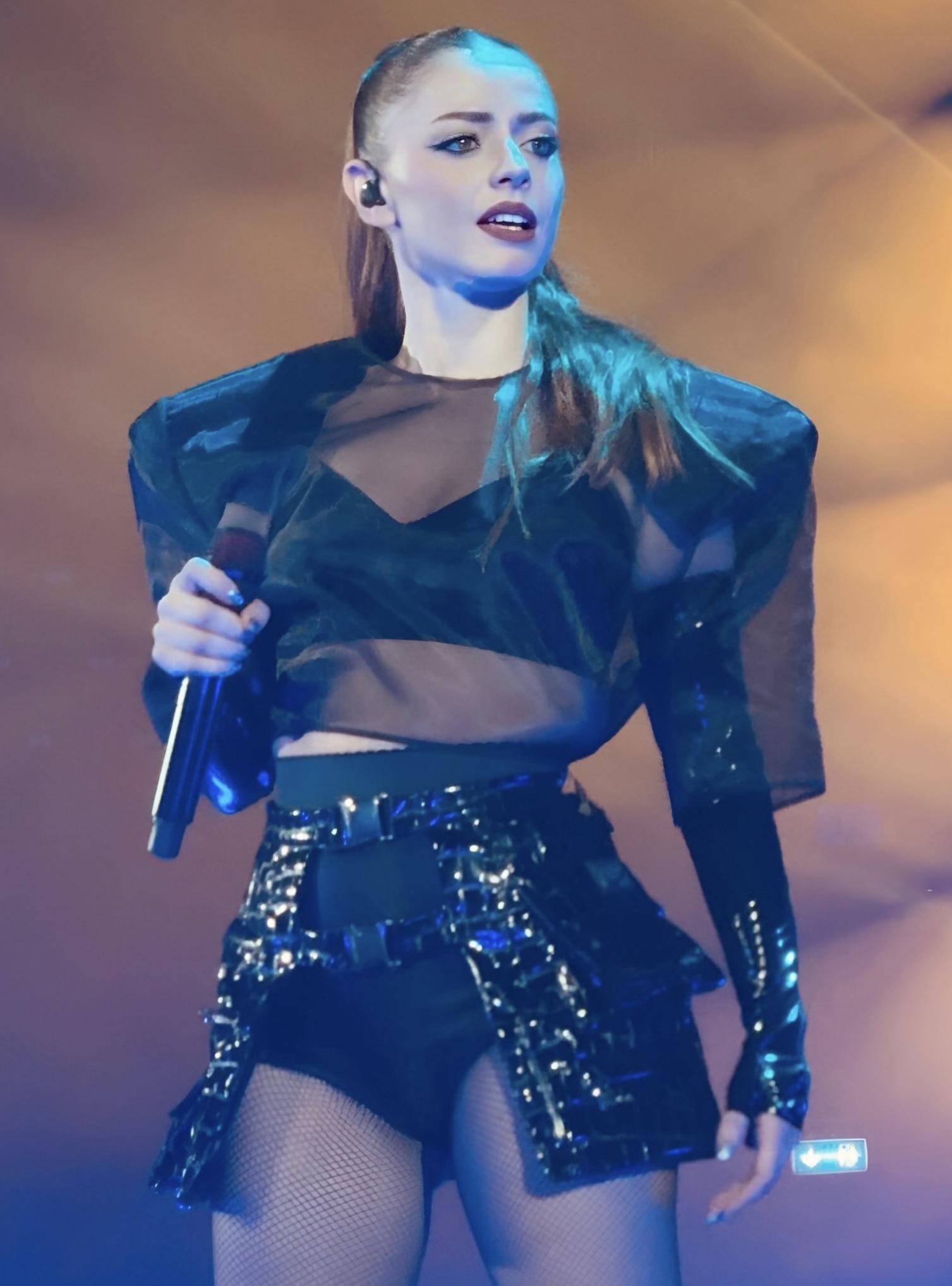
- Annalisa performing in 2023
- Born: Annalisa Scarrone; 5 August 1985 (age 41); Savona, Italy
- Other names: Annalisa; Nali
- Education: University of Turin (BS)
- Occupations: Singer; songwriter; record producer
- Years active: 2004–present
- Works: Discography
- Musical career
- Origin: Carcare, Italy
- Genres: Pop; electropop
- Labels: Hitland/Edel Music; Warner Music Italy; Atlantic Records Italy
- Formerly of: Elaphe Guttata (2005–2006) leNoire (ex Malvasia) (2006–2008)
- Website: annalisaofficial.it

Annalisa Scarrone (born 5 August 1985), better known mononymously as simply Annalisa or Nali, is an Italian singer-songwriter and record producer. After being part of two bands, Elaphe Guttata and leNoire (formerly Malvasia), she rose to fame after coming in second in the tenth season of the Italian talent show Amici di Maria De Filippi (2010–2011). Subsequently, Annalisa participated for the first time at the Sanremo Music Festival 2013 with the song "Scintille".

After her first participation, Annalisa took part in the Sanremo Music Festival 5 more times, reaching the podium twice, in 2018 with "Il mondo prima di te" and in 2024 with "Sinceramente". In 2023, she topped the Italian singles chart for the first time with the song "Mon amour", becoming the first female soloist to do so in over three years. Throughout her career she has received several awards including a Global Force Award at the Billboard Women in Music 2024 becoming the first Italian artist to receive this recognition. She also received two MTV Europe Music Awards (2018 and 2024), a Wind Music Award and a Lutezia Award for her songwriting, as well as nominations at the Kids' Choice Awards and World Music Awards. In 2023, Forbes Italia listed Annalisa among "the 100 successful women in Italy" of the year.

Annalisa has released 8 albums and 45 singles as a solo artist, receiving 52 platinum and 14 gold certifications and selling over 4,8 million copies in Italy, becoming the Italian female artist with most copies sold. She has also written songs for other artists including Gianna Nannini, Fedez, Benji & Fede and collaborated with David Guetta, Marco Mengoni, Boomdabash, J-Ax, Antonello Venditti, Gianluca Grignani, Vanesa Martín, Achille Lauro, and Tedua. From 2015 to 2019, she presented the documentary series Tutta colpa di... on Italia 1, focusing on the scientists Albert Einstein, Galileo Galilei, Charles Darwin, and Leonardo da Vinci. In 2024, the main-belt asteroid (20014) 1991 RM_{29} was named Annalisa in her honour.

== Early and personal life ==
Scarrone grew up in Carcare and studied music and singing from an early age. From the age of 13, she worked as a bartender and musician. Scarrone attended the University of Turin and graduated with a degree in physics in 2009. On 29 June 2023, Scarrone married Francesco Muglia, Chief Commercial Officer of Costa Crociere, in Assisi.

== Music career ==
=== 2011–2013: Nali, Mentre tutto cambia and Non so ballare ===
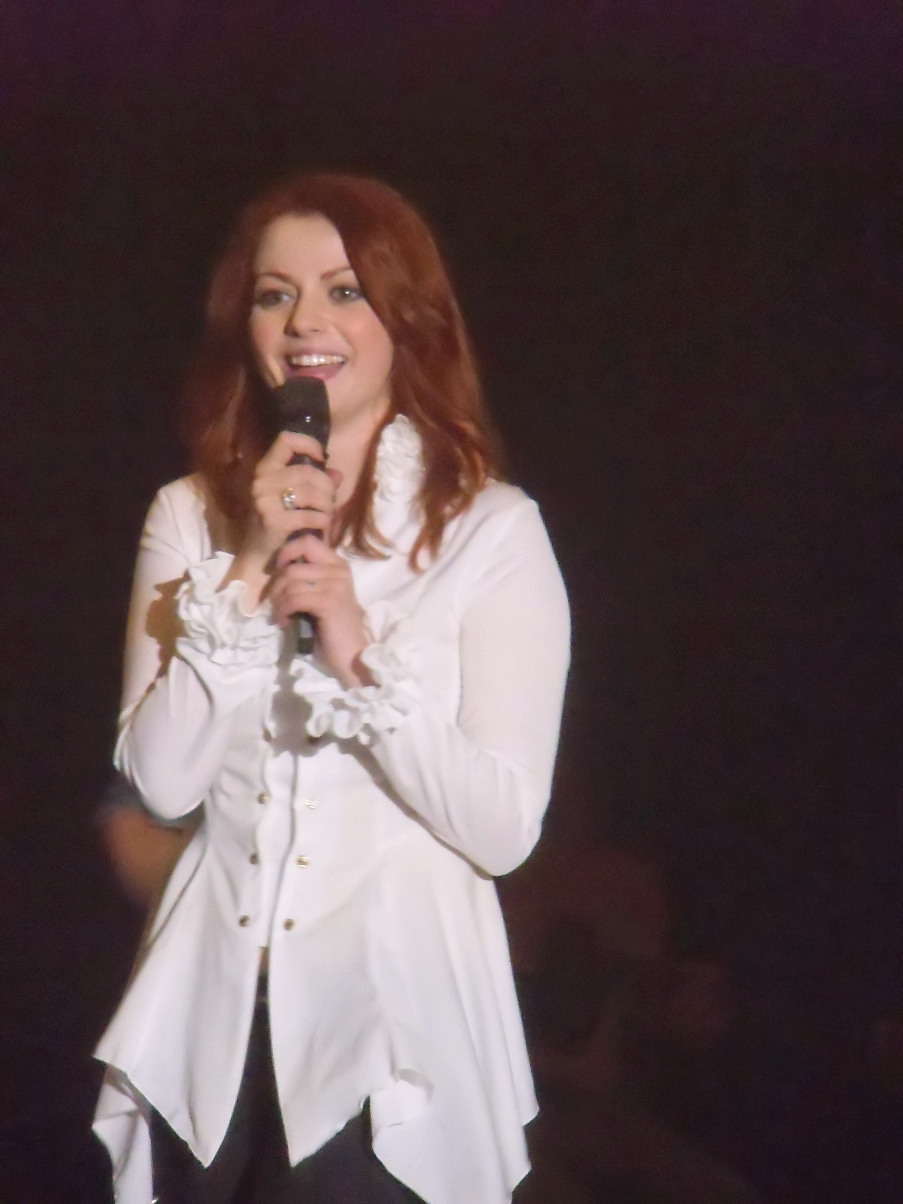
Annalisa in Rome in 2012

In 2011, Annalisa took part at the 10th edition of the Italian talent show Amici di Maria De Filippi where she finished second and also received the critics' prize. In March 2011 her first album Nali was released; it reached number 2 in the official Italian album chart by FIMI, and was certified platinum. Her first single "Diamante lei e luce lui", which in 2012 reached the ninth position in the official Italian single chart, was certified gold. In addition, this single won the Premio Videoclip Italiano 2011. Her second single "Giorno per giorno" was released on 27 May 2011. "Senza riserva", from the second album Mentre tutto cambia, was released on 16 March 2012 and later certified platinum. The second single of Mentre tutto cambia was "Tra due minuti è primavera". The last single from her second albun was "Per una notte o per sempre".

At the end of 2012, Annalisa sang "Pirati", which featured in the Italian version of the film Ice Age: Continental Drift. Annalisa participated at the Sanremo Music Festival 2013 and finished ninth, with the single "Scintille". At the same time, her third album Non so ballare was released and reached the sixth position in the official Italian album chart. During 2013, Annalisa represented Italy at the OGAE Song Contest with the song "Alice e il blu", the second single from the album Non so ballare, and finished third. She also had two nominations for Best Female Artist and Best Video with the song "Alice e il blu" at World Music Awards.

Annalisa subsequently represented Italy at the International Song Contest: The Global Sound with "Scintille", and in November won the competition. The third single from Non so ballare was "A modo mio amo" and its videoclip was a collage of the previous ones. In December 2013, Roberto Casalino, the author of many Annalisa's songs, announced that "Tutto sommato" from the second studio album Mentre tutto cambia, featured on the soundtrack of the Dutch film Toscaanse Bruiloft. In January 2014, the album was released in the Netherlands and "Tutto sommato" featured as a single. For these reasons, the singer was sent for the first time abroad to promote the film and her first album published abroad. The film also contains the two bonus tracks of the digital version of the Dutch iTunes album, the song "Non so ballare" and the unreleased song "Capirai".

=== 2014–2016: Splende and Se avessi un cuore ===
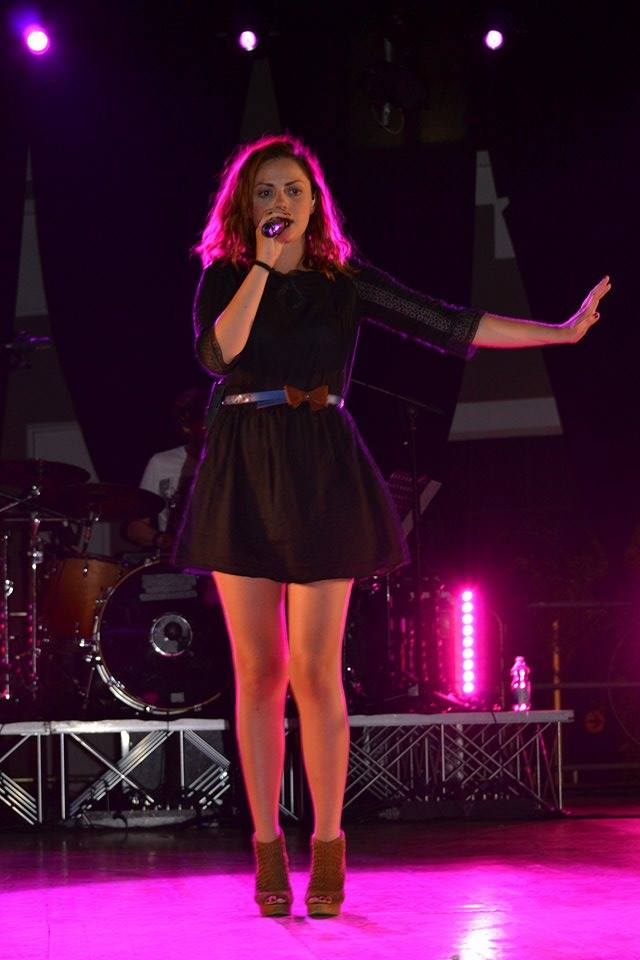
Annalisa in 2014

On 1 April 2014, Annalisa made a guest appearance on Incredibile, the new studio album of Moreno, featuring on the song "Ferire per amare". On 14 April 2014, it was announced that the single "Sento solo il presente" would anticipate the release of her fourth studio album. The song was released in Italy on 5 May 2014. It reached, the seventh position in the official Italian single chart.

In May 2014, Annalisa co-wrote "Siamo amore" for the competitor of the thirteenth edition of the talent show Amici, Giada Agasucci. She and Marco Ciappelli wrote the lyrics of the song, while the music was written by Francesco Sighieri and Diego Calvetti. "Siamo amore" was added to Giada album called Da capo and was released as a single on 20 June 2014. In September 2014, she released the single "L'ultimo addio". The text of the song was written by Annalisa and Marco Ciappelli, while the music was written by Francesco Sighieri. Annalisa collaborated with Italian rapper Raige, on the single "Dimenticare", released on 9 December 2014.

On 14 December 2014, the singer was announced as a competitor of Sanremo Music Festival 2015 with the song "Una finestra tra le stelle" and finished fourth. Along with the songs "Sento solo il presente" and "L'ultimo addio", "Una finestra tra le stelle" anticipated the release of the fourth album. On 23 January 2015, through the official page of Facebook of the singer, is also announced the title of the new album, Splende, available from 12 February. Annalisa also announced the first two dates of her Splende tour, on 1 April, at the Teatro Nuovo of Milan and 3 to Auditorium Parco della Musica of Rome, with pre-sales open from 26 January. On 8 May 2015, "Una finestra tra le stelle" was certified platinum for sales exceeding 50,000 copies.

The fourth single from Splende, "Vincerò", was published on 15 May 2015 and on 7 September 2015 was certified gold for sales over 25,000 copies. On 12 September 2015, Annalisa announced the release of the album's fifth single, via her official Facebook page. Following a countdown game, with images for clues, on 14 September the singer announced that the next single would be the title track, "Splende". The single was released on 18 September 2015. Annalisa participated at the Sanremo Musical Festival 2016 with the single "Il diluvio universale", finishing eleventh. The song anticipated her fifth album, Se avessi un cuore, which debuted at number four on the Italian Album Chart. On 15 April 2016, the singer released the second single from the album, "Se avessi un cuore", which was later certified gold by Fimi.

=== 2017–2021: Bye Bye and Nuda ===
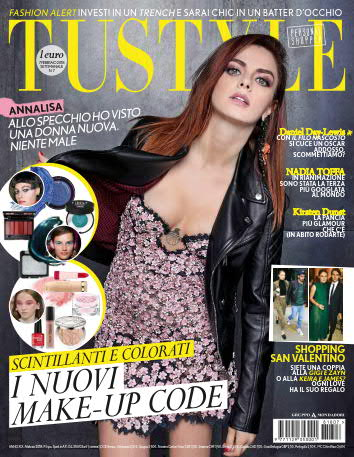
7 February 2018 cover of Tustyle

On 30 August 2017, Annalisa revealed she was working on her next studio album and on 13 October, the first single, "Direzione la vita", was released. On 16 February 2018, she released the studio album Bye Bye. The album peaked at number two of FIMI's chart, receiving platinum certification. Annalisa took part at the Sanremo Music Festival for the fourth time in 2018 and finished third, with the song "Il mondo prima di te". The song reached number three on the Italian singles chart. Throughout 2018, she released a further two singles from the album: "Bye Bye" and "Un domani" with Italian rapper Mr. Rain, both of which were certified platinum with over 50,000 copies sold.

On 29 November 2019, Annalisa released the single "Vento sulla luna", featuring vocals by Italian rapper Rkomi. On 13 April 2020, she released "Houseparty", the second single of her upcoming seventh studio album. In 2020, Annalisa collaborated with J-Ax for "Supercalifragili", which was the third single from rapper's album Reale, and with Achille Lauro in "Sweet Dreams".

In September 2020, the singer released her seventh studio album Nuda, with the third single "Tsunami". The singer participated at the Sanremo Music Festival 2021, with the single "Dieci", which was certified double platinum with over 140,000 copies sold. On 28 May 2021 "Movimento lento" was released as the second single from the re-issue of her seventh studio album Nuda10. The song peaked at number 8 on the FIMI Singles Chart and was certified triple platinum in Italy.

=== 2022–2024: E poi siamo finiti nel vortice ===
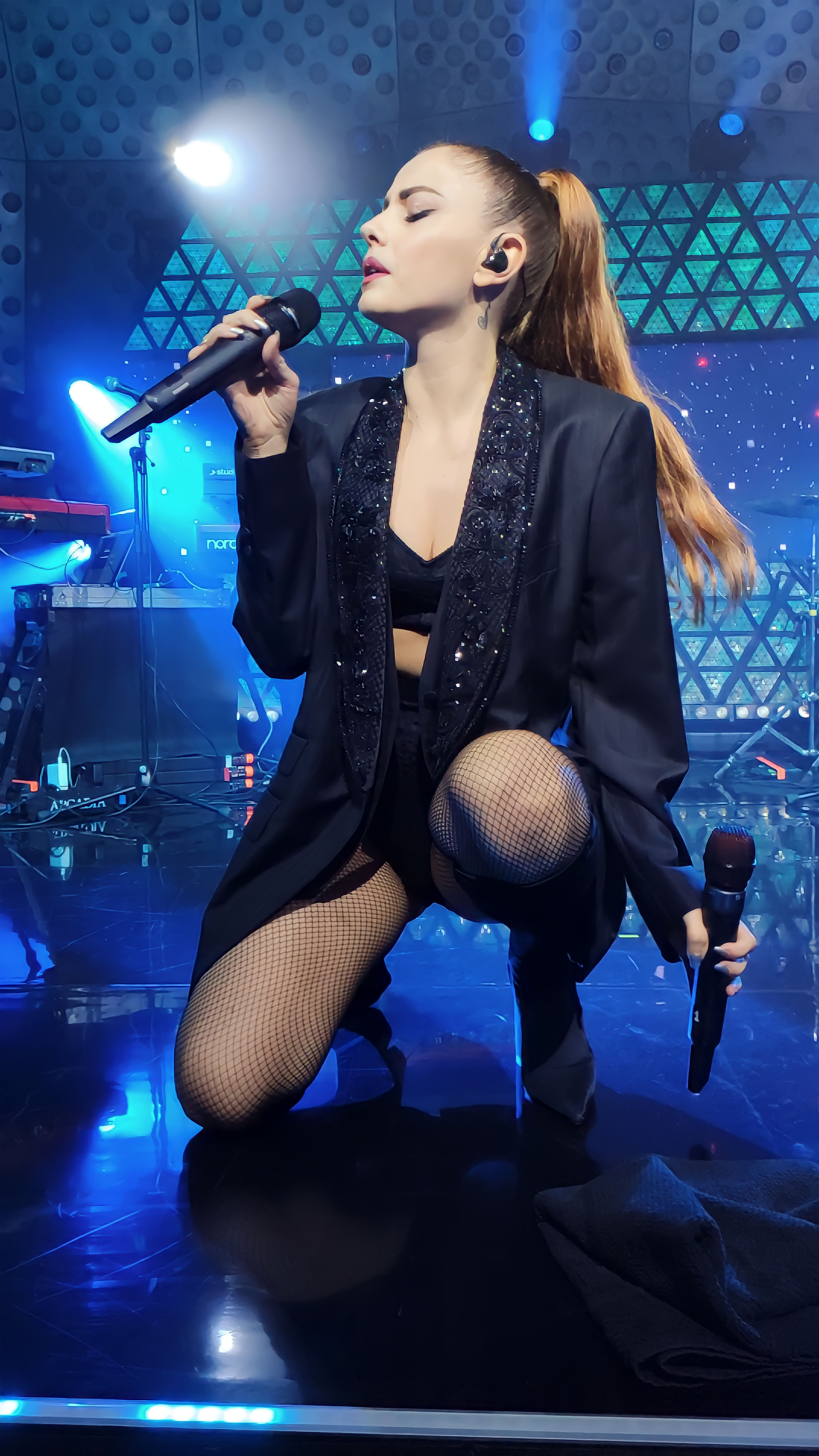
Annalisa in 2023

On 10 June 2022, Annalisa was featured on Boomdabash's single "Tropicana", which peaked at number 3 on the FIMI Singles Chart, becoming her tenth song to reach the top ten of the chart. The song also reached number 1 on the Italian airplay chart, and was certified quadruple platinum in Italy for sales exceeding 400,000 copies. On 26 August 2022, Annalisa announced through an interview with Vanity Fair Italia that her new single "Bellissima" would be released on 2 September 2022. The song reached number 7 on the Italian singles chart, becoming the first single by a woman to remain on the chart for over a year since the establishment of the FIMI chart in 2009. The track was also certified quintuple platinum in Italy, for sales exceeding 500,000 copies, making it her joint highest-selling song in the territory. Alongside her appearance at the Sanremo Music Festival, Annalisa announced her first concert at Mediolanum Forum, which took place on 4 November 2023.

On 31 March 2023, Annalisa released the single "Mon amour". It topped both the Italian airplay chart and the FIMI singles chart, becoming her first number one single and making her the first Italian solo female artist to top the chart since 2020. The song was certified five times platinum in Italy, for sales exceeding 500,000 copies. On 25 May 2023, Annalisa released the single "Disco Paradise" in collaboration with Fedez and Articolo 31, which peaked of number three on the Italian singles chart and was certified quintuple platinum in Italy, for sales exceeding 500,000 copies. In June 2023, Annalisa announced the title of her upcoming eighth studio album, E poi siamo finiti nel vortice, alongside this she announced her first arena tour, "Tutti nel vortice", which took place in April 2024 with dates in six Italian cities. On 30 August 2023, Annalisa revealed the cover of E poi siamo finiti nel vortice, announcing that it would be released on 29 September 2023. E poi siamo finiti nel vortice debuted atop the Italian albums chart, becoming her first number one album. On 8 September 2023 the album's third single, "Ragazza sola", was published released. On 23 November 2023, an Amazon Music Edition of E poi siamo finiti nel vortice was released, containing the original 12 tracks as well as a cover of "Christmas (Baby Please Come Home)" and an acoustic version of "Ragazza sola". The cover of "Christmas" was also featured in the Amazon original film Elf Me, which released digitally on 24 November.

Annalisa competed in the Sanremo Music Festival 2024 with the song "Sinceramente", finishing in third place and being included on the album. The song peaked at number two on the Italian singles chart and was certified quadruple platinum for sales exceeding 400,000 copies. On 24 May 2024, she was featured on the Tedua track "Beatrice", which debuted atop the Italian singles chart, becoming her second number one single. On 5 June 2024, she released the single "Storie brevi" with Tananai, which was digitally added to E poi siamo finiti nel vortice. The song peaked at number 2 on the Italian singles chart and was certified double platinum for sales in excess of 200,000 copies.

=== 2025–present: Ma io sono fuoco ===
On 14 February 2025, the fourth night of the Sanremo Music Festival 2025, Annalisa was Giorgia's guest performer for a cover of "Skyfall", which won the night. On 8 May 2025 "Maschio" was published as the lead single for her ninth studio album Ma io sono fuoco, published on 10 October 2025. The album was promoted by the collaboration "Piazza San Marco", featuring Italian singer Marco Mengoni.

== Discography ==
- Nali (2011)
- Mentre tutto cambia (2012)
- Non so ballare (2013)
- Splende (2015)
- Se avessi un cuore (2016)
- Bye Bye (2018)
- Nuda (2020)
- E poi siamo finiti nel vortice (2023)
- Ma io sono fuoco (2025)

== Tours ==
- Mentre tutto cambia Tour (2012)
- Non so ballare Tour (2013)
- Splende Tour (2015)
- Se avessi un cuore Tour (2016)
- Bye Bye live (2018)
- Nuda10 Open Air (2021)
- Tutti nel vortice Tour (2024)
- Ma noi siamo fuoco Capitolo I (2025)

== Filmography ==
=== Television ===
Year	Title	Role	Notes
2010–2011	Amici di Maria De Filippi	Contestant	Runner-up (season 10)
2015–2025	Sanremo Music Festival	Herself–performer	Contestant (2013, 2015, 2016, 2018, 2021, 2024); Guest performer (2025)
2015–2019	Tutta colpa di...	Host	Television program
2023	Drag Race Italia	Special guest	Season 3; Episode: "Express Yourself"
2024	Annalisa: Tutti in arena	Host–performer	Television special

=== Film ===
Year	Title	Role	Notes
2015	Babbo Natale non viene da Nord	India	Acting debut

== Awards and nominations ==
Award	Year	Category	Nominated work	Result	Ref.
Billboard Women in Music	2024	Global Force Award	Herself	Won	
BreakTudo Awards	2023	Best International Video	"Mon amour"	Nominated	
Fox Music League	2014	Best Song	"Alice e il blu"	Won	
Gran Gala Perla del Tirreno	2013	Perla del Tirreno Award	Herself	Won	
International Song Contest	2013	Global Sound	"Scintille"	Won	
Latin Music Italian Awards	2014	Best International Female Artist	Herself	Nominated	
Latin Music Italian Awards	2014	Best International Female Video	"Sento solo il presente"	Nominated	
Latin Music Italian Awards	2015	Best International Female Video	"Una finestra tra le stelle"	Nominated	
Latin Music Italian Awards	2015	Best International Female Artist	Herself	Nominated	
Los 40 Music Awards	2024	Fenomeno del año	Herself	Won	
Lunezia Award	2012	Special Mention	Mentre tutto cambia	Won	
MTV Europe Music Awards	2018	Best Italian Act	Herself	Won	
MTV Europe Music Awards	2023	Best Italian Act	Herself	Nominated	
MTV Europe Music Awards	2024	Best Italian Act	Herself	Won	
MTV Italian Awards	2013	Artist saga	Herself	Nominated	
MTV Italian Awards	2015	Artist saga	Herself	Nominated	
MTV Italian Awards	2015	Wonder Woman	Herself	Nominated	
MTV Italian Awards	2015	MTV Awards Star	Herself	Nominated	
MTV Italian Awards	2015	Best Live Performance	Herself	Nominated	
MTV Italian Awards	2016	Best Live Performance	Herself	Nominated	
MTV Italian Awards	2016	Artist saga	Herself	Nominated	
MTV Italian Awards	2016	Wonder Woman	Herself	Nominated	
MTV Italian Awards	2016	MTV Awards Star	Herself	Nominated	
Nickelodeon Kids' Choice Awards	2015	Best Italian Singer	Herself	Nominated	
OGAE Song Contest	2013	Winning song	"Alice e il blu"	3rd place	
OGAE Song Contest	2023	Winning song	"Mon amour"	3rd place	
OGAE Song Contest	2024	Winning song	"Euforia"	1st place	
Onstage Awards	2019	Best Female Artist	Herself	Nominated	
Premio Videoclip Italiano	2011	Best Video (New Artist)	"Diamante lei e luce lui"	Won	
Premio Videoclip Italiano	2012	Best Video (Female Artist)	"Senza riserva"	Won	
RadioStop Festival	2015	Best Radio Artist	Herself	Won	
Rembrandt Award	2015	Best Film Hitsong	"Tutto sommato"	Nominated	
Rockol Awards	2012	Best Song	"Senza riserva"	Nominated	
Rockol Awards	2012	Best Video	"Senza riserva"	Nominated	
Rockol Awards	2013	Best Album	Non so ballare	Nominated	
Rockol Awards	2013	Best Song	"Scintille"	Nominated	
Rockol Awards	2013	Best Tour	Non so ballare Tour	Nominated	
Rockol Awards	2016	Best Album	Se avessi un cuore	Nominated	
Rockol Awards	2016	Best Tour	Se avessi un cuore Tour	Nominated	
Rockol Awards	2018	Best Album	Bye Bye	Nominated	
Rockol Awards	2018	Best Video	"Il mondo prima di te"	Nominated	
Rockol Awards	2023	Best Album	E poi siamo finiti nel vortice	Nominated	
Rolling Stone (Italy)	2023	Best Italian Album of 2023	E poi siamo finiti nel vortice	30th place	
RTL 102.5 Award	2014	Song of Summer	"Sento solo il presente"	Nominated	
RTL 102.5 Award	2015	Song of Summer	"Vincerò"	Nominated	
RTL 102.5 Award	2016	Best Radio Song	"Il diluvio universale"	Won	
RTL 102.5 Award	2017	Song of Summer	"Tutto per una ragione"	Nominated	
RTL 102.5 Award	2018	Song of Summer	"Bye Bye"	Nominated	
RTL 102.5 Award	2021	Song of Summer	"Movimento lento"	Nominated	
RTL 102.5 Award	2022	Song of Summer	"Tropicana"	Nominated	
RTL 102.5 Award	2023	Song of Summer	"Disco Paradise"	Nominated	
RTL 102.5 Award	2023	Song of Summer	"Mon amour"	Nominated	
RTL 102.5 Award	2023	SIAE Award	"Mon amour"	Won	
RTL 102.5 Award	2024	SIAE Award	"Sinceramente"	Won	
RTL 102.5 Award	2024	Best Radio Song	"Sinceramente"	Won	
RTL 102.5 Award	2024	Song of Summer	"Storie brevi"	Won	
Sanremo Music Festival	2013	Winning Song	"Scintille"	9th place	
Sanremo Music Festival	2015	Winning Song	"Una finestra tra le stelle"	4th place	
Sanremo Music Festival	2016	Winning Song	"Il diluvio universale"	11th place	
Sanremo Music Festival	2018	Winning Song	"Il mondo prima di te"	3rd place	
Sanremo Music Festival	2021	Winning Song	"Dieci"	7th place	
Sanremo Music Festival	2024	Winning Song	"Sinceramente"	3rd place	
SIAE Music Awards	2023	Best Radio Song	"Bellissima"	Nominated	
SIAE Music Awards	2024	Best Dance Song	"Mon amour"	Nominated	
SIAE Music Awards	2024	Best Streaming Song	"Mon amour"	Nominated	
SIAE Music Awards	2024	Best Social Song	"Mon amour"	Nominated	
Telegatto	2024	Honorary Award	Herself	Won	
Telegatto	2024	Song of the Year	"Storie brevi"	Won	
Velvet Awards	2013	Best Song	"Alice e il blu"	Won	
Velvet Awards	2013	Best Live	Non so ballare Tour	Nominated	
Velvet Awards	2014	Song of the Summer	"Sento solo il presente"	Won	
Velvet Awards	2016	Song of the Year	"Potrei abituarmi"	Nominated	
Velvet Awards	2018	Song of the Summer	"Tutto per una ragione"	Nominated	
World Music Awards	2013	Best Female Artist	Herself	Nominated	
World Music Awards	2013	Best Video	"Alice e il blu"	Nominated	
World Music Awards	2014	Best Song	"Alice e il blu"	Nominated	
World Music Awards	2014	Best Live Act	Herself	Nominated	

Awards and achievements
Preceded by (Sweden) Mariette (Sweden) Marcus & Martinus	OGAE Second Chance Contest winner 2018; 2024	Succeeded by (France) Seemone; Incumbent
