= Tropicana (Boomdabash and Annalisa song) =

2022 single by Italian group Boomdabash

Single by Boomdabash and Annalisa

from the album Venduti
- Released: 10 June 2022
- Genre: Dance pop
- Length: 2:52
- Label: B1/Soulmatical Music; Capitol
- Songwriters: Alessandro Merli; Fabio Clemente; Federica Abbate; Jacopo Ettorre
- Producer: Takagi & Ketra

Boomdabash and Annalisa singles chronology
"Fantastica" (2021)	"Tropicana" (2022)	"Heaven" (2022)

Annalisa singles chronology
"Eva+Eva" (2021)	"Tropicana" (2022)	"Bellissima" (2022)

Music video
- "Tropicana" on YouTube

"Tropicana" is a song by Italian group Boomdabash and Italian singer singer Annalisa. It was released on 10 June 2022 through B1/Soulmatical Music and Capitol Records as the lead single from the group's sixth studio album Venduti.

== Composition ==
The song, written by the duo Takagi & Ketra with Federica Abbate and Jacopo Ettore, marked the first collaboration between the group and the singer. The music production pays homage to the music of the 1970s and 1980s with influences from traditional Apulian music pizzica. The band described the meaning of the song and their decision to collaborate with Annalisa:

"We strongly believe in the universal language of music and its power to cheer people up. Very often, it is a song that distracts us from the thousand problems that afflict our daily lives. [...] Sharing this new adventure with Annalisa, an artist we have admired for many years, is a source of great satisfaction for us. Annalisa is the perfect companion for this song, an artist who shares our love of musical experimentation, with an exceptional and charismatic voice, a tone that caresses but at the same time stings and scratches. A pearl that embellishes "Tropicana"."

== Critical reception ==
Tropicana received mixed reviews from music critics. Giulia Ciavarelli of TV Sorrisi e Canzoni found that the single "captivates listeners from the first listen" thanks to its "dance sounds that reflect the band's energy and lend themselves to being the soundtrack of the summer season". Instead Fabio Fiume of All Music Italia noted how the dance sounds "make the mistake of suddenly slowing down" the rhythm of the song, and was also unimpressed by the lyrics, describing them as a collection of “meaningless phrases". Fiume added that Annalisa's performance was “wasted" because he found her to be "completely disengaged, even in her vocal presence; [...] Whether it was her, Baby K, or Elettra Lamborghini, it would have made no difference to the outcome of the song".

== Music video ==
The official music video, directed by Fabrizio Conte and filmed in Salento, was released on July 6, 2022.

== Charts ==
=== Weekly charts ===
Weekly chart performance for "Tropicana"
Chart (2022–2023)	Peak position
Italy (FIMI)	7
Italy Airplay (EarOne)	1
Switzerland (Schweizer Hitparade)	70

=== Year-end charts ===
Year-end chart performance for "Tropicana "
Chart	Year	Position
Italy (FIMI)	2022	24

== Certifications ==
Region	Certification	Certified units/sales
Italy (FIMI)	4× Platinum	400,000^{‡}
^{‡} Sales+streaming figures based on certification alone.
