= Storie brevi =

Single by Tananai and Annalisa

from the album CalmoCobra and E poi siamo finiti nel vortice (digital reissue)
- Released: 5 June 2024
- Genre: Pop
- Length: 2:55
- Label: Capitol; Warner; Universal
- Songwriters: Annalisa Scarrone; Alberto Cotta Ramusino; Paolo Antonacci; Davide Simonetta
- Producers: Davide Simonetta; Tananai

Tananai singles chronology
"Ho fatto un sogno" (2024)	"Storie brevi" (2024)	"Ragni" (2024)

Annalisa singles chronology
"Istinto animale" (2024)	"Storie brevi" (2024)	"Beatrice" (2024)

Music video
- "Storie brevi" on YouTube

"Storie brevi" (transl. Short stories) is a song by Italian singers Tananai and Annalisa. It was written by the two artists with co-writing contribution by Paolo Antonacci and Davide Simonetta, and produced by Simonetta and Tananai. It was released by Capitol Records and Warner Music Italy on 5 June 2024 ad the second single from Tananai's third studio album, CalmoCobra, and included in the digital reissue of Annalisa's eight studio album E poi siamo finiti nel vortice

== Release ==
The song was performed for the first time at the Road to Battiti Live concert in Giovinazzo on 2 June 2024.

The song was subsequently released on 5 June 2024 as a single, and added as a bonus track to Annalisa's eighth studio album E poi siamo finiti nel vortice, and after "Veleno", was the second single released by Tananai ahead of his upcoming third album, CalmoCobra.

The record was released by Capitol Records, Warner Music Italia and Universal Music Italia.

== Music video ==
A visual art video for "Storie brevi" was released on the same day via Annalisa's YouTube channel on 5 June 2024. The official music video, directed by Bendo, was released via Tananai's channel on 24 June 2024. The video depicts the two singers as a Bonnie and Clyde-esque couple flirting in the Villa Rusconi-Clerici on Lake Maggiore.

== Reception ==
The song was performed at the Power Hits Estate concert organised by the radio station RTL 102.5, and crowned as the most played song of the summer by the station.

The song received a generally positive reception from critics, calling it the "song of the summer".

Annalisa herself compares the song to "Somethin' Stupid" as covered by Robbie Williams and Nicole Kidman or Nick Cave and Kylie Minogue. Tananai cites Daft Punk and The Strokes as his inspiration.

== Charts ==
=== Weekly charts ===
Weekly chart performance for "Storie brevi"
Chart (2024)	Peak position
Italy (FIMI)	2
Italy Airplay (EarOne)	1

=== Year-end charts ===
Year-end chart performance for "Storie brevi"
Chart	Year	Position
Italy (FIMI)	2024	15
Italy (FIMI)	2025	79

== Certifications ==
Certifications for "Storie brevi"
Region	Certification	Certified units/sales
Italy (FIMI)	3× Platinum	300,000^{‡}
^{‡} Sales+streaming figures based on certification alone.
