= Beatrice (song) =

Single by Tedua featuring Annalisa

from the album La Divina Commedia Deluxe (Paradiso)
- Released: 6 September 2024
- Length: 3:03
- Label: Epic
- Songwriters: Mario Molinari; Annalisa Scarrone; Federica Abbate; Francesca Calearo; Giorgio De Lauri; Luca Di Biasi
- Producers: Dibla; Jiz

Tedua singles chronology
"Eva" (2024)	"Beatrice" (2024)	"Purple Rain" (2024)

Annalisa singles chronology
"Storie brevi" (2024)	"Beatrice" (2024)	"Maschio" (2025)

Music video
- "Beatrice" on YouTube

"Beatrice" is a song by Italian rapper Tedua with featured vocals by Italian singer Annalisa. It was included in Paradiso, the re-issue of Tedua's third studio album, La Divina Commedia, and released as a radio single on 6 September 2024.

The song is written by the artists with Madame, Federica Abbate, Giorgio De Lauri, and Luca Di Biasi. It is inspired by Beatrice, the woman loved by poet Dante Alighieri.

The song topped the Italian Singles Chart and was certified double platinum.

== Music video ==
The music video for "Beatrice", directed by Martina Pastori, was released on 5 September 2024 via Tedua's YouTube channel.

== Charts ==
Weekly chart performance for "Beatrice"
Chart (2024)	Peak position
Italy (FIMI)	1
Italy Airplay (EarOne)	26

== Certifications ==
Certifications for "Beatrice"
Region	Certification	Certified units/sales
Italy (FIMI)	2× Platinum	200,000^{‡}
^{‡} Sales+streaming figures based on certification alone.
