= E poi siamo finiti nel vortice =

Eighth studio album of Annalisa

Studio album by Annalisa
- Released: 29 September 2023
- Recorded: 2021–2023
- Genres: Electropop; dance-pop; pop
- Length: 38:46
- Language: Italian
- Label: Warner Music Italy
- Producers: Simonetta; Zef

Annalisa chronology
Nuda (2020)	E poi siamo finiti nel vortice (2023)	Ma io sono fuoco (2025)

Singles from E poi siamo finiti nel vortice
- 1. "Bellissima" Released: 2 September 2022; 2. "Mon amour" Released: 31 March 2023; 3. "Ragazza sola" Released: 8 September 2023; 4. "Euforia" Released: 17 November 2023; 5. "Sinceramente" Released: 7 February 2024; 6. "Storie brevi" Released: 5 June 2024

E poi siamo finiti nel vortice (Italian for 'And then we ended up in the vortex') is the eighth studio album by Italian singer-songwriter Annalisa, released on 29 September 2023 by Warner Music Italy. The album marks a new artistic direction for the singer, blending electropop and 1980s music influences. The album peaked at number one on Italian Albums Chart, becoming the singer’s first album to achieve it, being certified triple platinum by FIMI for sales exceeding 150,000 copies.

It was promoted by several successful singles on Italian singles chart, including the lead single "Bellissima", which became the highest certified female solo song since FIMI. The second single, "Mon amour", became her first number one single. In 2024, the album was reissued including the song "Sinceramente", which competed at the 74th Sanremo Music Festival.

== Composition and themes ==
The album consists of twelve tracks, written by Annalisa herself with several authors and producers, including Davide Simonetta, Alessandro Raina, Paolo Antonacci, Zef, Room9, Placido Salamone, and Raffaele Esposito. In an interview with Rockol, Annalisa explained the creative process following the release of her seventh studio album Nuda and the meaning of the new album:

"I worked differently, that is, by subtraction, taking away constructions, preconceptions and superstructures, I wanted to go to the root. ... There were three factors. The first: when I started making music I felt the need to be known. I wanted to be understood. I didn't think I was putting myself in the service of entertainment. After Nuda I realized that I also wanted something else. From there my 'transformations' were born. The second factor is being able to identify the two sides that I love most and that work on me and for me: vocals and electronics. The third factor: what happened outside. Where the world moves, the historical period: everything contributed. People wanted this change of pace, the time was ripe for it."

The singer explicated the meaning of the album's title, defined as "metaphorical" about the different phases of life identified in the "vortex", in which "enthusiasm is represented, there are disappointments, things that change, twists and turns, an ending. And then you start again." From a music direction viewpoint, Annalisa said she was inspired by electropop and 1980s music.

== Promotion and release ==
=== Singles ===
The first single "Bellissima" was released on 2 September 2022. The song peaked at number 7 on the Italian singles chart and became the first single by a woman to remain on the chart for over a year since the establishment of the FIMI chart in 2006. The track was also certified quadruple platinum in Italy, for sales exceeding 400,000 units, making it her highest-selling song in the territory and the highest certified female solo song since FIMI. On 31 March 2023, "Mon amour" was published as the album's second single. The song topped both the Italian airplay chart and the FIMI singles chart, becoming her first number one single and making her the first Italian solo female artist to top the chart since 2020. On 4 September 2023, Annalisa announced that the album's third single, "Ragazza sola", would be released on 8 September 2023.

In an interview with Vanity Fair, Annalisa discussed her motivation for choosing these three singles, designed as a musical and visual trilogy:

"I have tried, with the songs, to identify the various phases of these cycles: in "Bellissima", I identify in the unexpected a decisive moment of all paths, the moment when you ask yourself questions about why what you had hoped for did not happen. In "Mon amour", I talk about the desire for revenge and to take a freedom you had forgotten, and in "Ragazza sola", I address the desire to relearn how to be with yourself. Each song describes an emotional phase"

"Euforia" was released as the fourth single from the album on 17 November 2023. On February 7, 2024 "Sinceramente" was published as the lead single for the re-issued of the album after her participation at the 74th Sanremo Music Festival with the song.

=== Announcement ===
In June 2023, Annalisa announced the title of the album as E poi siamo finiti nel vortice, with a release date set for autumn 2023. On 30 August 2023, Annalisa revealed the cover of the album, announcing that it would be released on 29 September 2023. The full track listing for the album was revealed on 19 September 2023.

=== Tutti nel vortice tour ===
Alongside her appearance at the Sanremo Music Festival in February 2023, Annalisa announced her first concert at Mediolanum Forum in Milan, which took place on 4 November 2023. The concert sold out, with 12,000 in attendance, and was televised live through RTL 102.5. Alongside the announcement of the album's title in June 2023, Annalisa announced her first arena tour, Tutti nel vortice, set to take place in April 2024 with dates in six Italian cities. In October 2023, two further dates were announced in Turin and Bologna. In December 2023, a third date was announced in Milan, with the concert in Padua relocated to a larger venue. In January 2024, her first solo concert at Verona Arena was announced for 14 May under the name "Tutti in Arena".

List of concerts, showing date, city, and venue
Date	City	Country	Venue	Description
4 November 2023	Milan	Italy	Mediolanum Forum	Sold out
6 April 2024	Florence	Italy	Nelson Mandela Forum	Sold out
8 April 2024	Turin	Italy	Pala Alpitour	Sold out
10 April 2024	Milan	Italy	Mediolanum Forum	Sold out
12 April 2024	Bari	Italy	Palaflorio	Sold out
13 April 2024	Naples	Italy	Palapartenope	Sold out
17 April 2024	Bologna	Italy	Unipol Arena	Sold out
21 April 2024	Rome	Italy	PalaLottomatica	Sold out
24 April 2024	Padua	Italy	Kioene Arena	Sold out
29 April 2024	Milan	Italy	Mediolanum Forum	Sold out
14 May 2024	Verona	Italy	Verona Arena	Sold out
20 May 2024	Verona	Italy	Verona Arena	Sold out

== Critical reception ==
Claudio Cabona of Rockol described the album as having a "mainly electronic and enveloping sound, with lots of references to the 1980s and some sprinklings of the 1960s" with references to Nada, Raffaella Carrà, and Donatella Rettore, resulting in "extremely fun, self-deprecating and danceable". In the review, the album is described as "true and believable", as it "speaks the language of these times, in every respect", with the tracks' goal of "making the listener's days less bitter. Sometimes you forget that, but that really should be the essence of pop." Among the tracks, he says "Stelle" is the best song "from the point of view of the balance between lyrics and music", and "Indaco violento" is "the symbolic piece of the project". For the same site, Mattia Marzi wrote that the singer in the project appears "sexy, unprejudiced and ironic as never before" but without "pulling a new Beyoncé", as she sings in the tracks "with a fresh, pop, empathetic and even funny manner".

Ondarock's writer Claudio Fabretti called E poi siamo finiti nel vortice "a perfectly contemporary record", in which the singer enacts an "irreversible transformation" toward an "electropop turn", and that "[19]80s electronica" goes well with "the shadowy, restless mezzo-soprano". On the album he found that "bolder lyrical flutters" alternated with "teenage TikTok withdrawal slips", calling the latter choice an attempted "update to the two-thousand of the old italo disco", although it "does not always appear able to fill it with content up to the mark". Fabrietti wrote that the album as a whole shows an Annalisa "no longer a pretentious intimate singer-songwriter but not yet fully comfortable in the role of femme fatale to be whipped around the dance floor", hoping that "she can rediscover that elegant singer-songwriter ambition and taste for Mina-like refinement that, after all, she has always sought. And, to quote 'Mon amour', 'I'm in'."

== Track listing ==
E poi siamo finiti nel vortice – Standard track listing
No.	Title	Lyrics	Music	Producer(s)	Length
1.	"Bellissima"	Annalisa Scarrone; Paolo Antonacci; Davide Simonetta	Scarrone; Antonacci; Simonetta	Davide Simonetta	3:21
2.	"Ragazza sola"	Scarrone; Alessandro Raina; Simonetta	Scarrone; Raina; Simonetta	Simonetta	3:19
3.	"Euforia"	Scarrone; Antonacci; Simonetta	Scarrone; Antonacci; Simonetta	Simonetta	3:00
4.	"Mon amour"	Scarrone; Antonacci; Simonetta	Scarrone; Antonacci; Simonetta; Stefano Tognini	Simonetta; Zef	3:23
5.	"Rosso corallo"	Scarrone; Raina; Simonetta	Scarrone; Raina; Simonetta	Simonetta	3:20
6.	"Bollicine"	Scarrone; Antonacci; Simonetta	Scarrone; Antonacci; Simonetta	Simonetta	3:26
7.	"Gommapiuma"	Scarrone; Raina; Antonacci; Simonetta	Scarrone; Raina; Antonacci; Simonetta	Simonetta; Placido Salamone	3:01
8.	"Aria"	Scarrone; Gabriel Rossi; Lorenzo Santarelli; Marco Salvaderi	Scarrone; Rossi; Santarelli; Salvaderi	ROOM9	3:03
9.	"La crisi a Saint-Tropez"	Scarrone; Antonacci; Simonetta	Scarrone; Antonacci; Simonetta	Simonetta	3:08
10.	"Ti dico solo"	Scarrone; Rossi; Santarelli; Salvaderi	Scarrone; Rossi; Santarelli; Salvaderi	ROOM9	3:09
11.	"Stelle"	Scarrone; Raffaele Esposito; Simonetta	Scarrone; Esposito; Simonetta	Simonetta	3:17
12.	"Indaco violento"	Scarrone; Antonacci; Simonetta	Scarrone; Antonacci; Simonetta	Simonetta	3:14
Total length:					38:46

E poi siamo finiti nel vortice: Sanremo Edition – bonus track
No.	Title	Lyrics	Music	Producer(s)	Length
1.	"Sinceramente"	Scarrone; Antonacci; Simonetta	Scarrone; Antonacci; Simonetta; Tognini	Simonetta; Zef	3:35
Total length:					42:23

E poi siamo finiti nel vortice – Digital reissue bonus track
No.	Title	Lyrics	Music	Producer(s)	Length
1.	"Storie brevi" (with Tananai)	Scarrone; Alberto Cotta Ramusino; Antonacci; Simonetta	Simonetta; Ramusino	Simonetta; Tananai	3:35
Total length:					45:18

== Charts ==
=== Weekly charts ===
Weekly chart performance for E poi siamo finiti nel vortice
Chart (2023)	Peak position
Italian Albums (FIMI)	1
Swiss Albums (Schweizer Hitparade)	42

=== Year-end charts ===
Chart	Year	Position
Italian Albums (FIMI)	2023	45
Italian Albums (FIMI)	2024	9
Italian Albums (FIMI)	2025	73

== Certifications ==
Certifications for E poi siamo finiti nel vortice
Region	Certification	Certified units/sales
Italy (FIMI)	4× Platinum	200,000^{‡}
^{‡} Sales+streaming figures based on certification alone.
