= Se avessi un cuore =

Studio album by Annalisa
- Released: 20 May 2016
- Recorded: 2016
- Genre: Electropop
- Length: 38:40
- Language: Italian
- Label: Warner
- Producers: Diego Calvetti; Gadi Sassoon; Fabrizio Ferraguzzo; Luca Chiaravalli; MACE

Annalisa chronology
Splende (2015)	Se avessi un cuore (2016)	Bye Bye (2018)

Singles from Se avessi un cuore
- 1. "Il diluvio universale" Released: 9 February 2016; 2. "Se avessi un cuore" Released: 15 April 2016; 3. "Used to You / Potrei abituarmi" Released: 12 August 2016

Se avessi un cuore is the fifth studio album by Italian singer-songwriter Annalisa, released on 20 May 2016 through Warner Music Italy.

== Background ==
Se avessi un cuore consists of 12 tracks and marks a departure from Annalisa's previous traditional pop sound, exploring a more electronic and dance sound. In addition, according to the interview with Radio Italia Solo Musica Italiana, Annalisa declared: "Se avessi un cuore is the album that I always wanted to do."

== Receptions ==
Professional ratings
Review scores
Source	Rating
aLLMusicItalia	8/10 stars
Rockol	3.5/5 stars

Se avessi un cuore debuted at the 4th position of the FIMI Albums Chart.

== Track listing ==
No.	Title	Lyrics	Music	Length
1.	"Se avessi un cuore"	Annalisa Scarrone; Davide Simonetta	Scarrone; Simonetta	02:54
2.	"Leggerissima"	Scarrone; Simonetta; Luca Chiaravalli; Andrea Bonomo	Scarrone; Simonetta; Chiaravalli; Bonomo	03:23
3.	"Noi siamo un'isola"	Scarrone; Simonetta; Bonomo	Scarrone; Simonetta; Bonomo	03:09
4.	"Coltiverò l'amore"	Scarrone; Simonetta	Scarrone; Simonetta	03:49
5.	"Uno"	Scarrone	Scarrone	03:17
6.	"Potrei abituarmi"	Scarrone; Dua Lipa; Lucy Taylor; Nicholas Gale	Lipa; Taylor; Gale	03:19
7.	"A cuore spento"	Scarrone; Diego Calvetti; Francesco Sighieri; Alessandro Sappino	Scarrone; Calvetti; Sighieri; Sappino	02:53
8.	"Inatteso"	Scarrone; Simonetta; Bonomo; Sighieri	Scarrone; Simonetta; Bonomo; Sighieri	03:30
9.	"Le coincidenze"	Scarrone; Calvetti; Sighieri; Luca Consortini	Scarrone; Calvetti; Sighieri; Consortini; Simone Benussi	03:38
10.	"Quello che non sai di me"	Scarrone; Emiliano Cecere; Saverio Grandi	Scarrone; Cecere; Grandi	04:07
11.	"Il diluvio universale"	Scarrone; Calvetti	Calvetti	03:24
12.	"Used to You"	Lipa; Taylor; Gale	Lipa; Taylor; Gale	03:19
Total length:				38:40

== Credits and personnel ==
- Annalisa - lead vocals, backing vocals
- Luca Chiaravalli - piano, keyboards, bass guitar, electric guitar, programming
- Andrea Bonomo - acoustic guitar
- Donato Romano - synthesizer, programming
- Fabrizio Ferraguzzo - bass guitar, electric guitar, lap steel guitar, synthesizer, programming
- Davide Simonetta - keyboards, bass guitar, electric guitar
- Gianmarco Manilardi - programming
- Emiliano Bassi - drums, bass guitar, keyboards, programming
- Gadi Sasoon - synthesizer, programming
- Riccardo "Deepa" Di Paola - piano, Fender Rhodes, synthesizer, clavinet, drum machine
- Antonio Filippelli - synthesizer
- Lapo Consortini - electric guitar
- Diego Calvetti - synthesizer, piano, programming
- Mace - synthesizer, programming
- First Violin - Angela Savi, Claudia Rizzitelli, Angela Tomei
- Second Violin - Maria Landolfa, Natalia Kuleshova, Roberta Malavolti
- Cello - Diana Muenter, Laura Gorkoff

== Charts ==
Chart (2016)	Peak position
Italian Albums (FIMI)	4
Swiss Albums (Schweizer Hitparade)	91
