= Tedua =

Italian singer-songwriter, rapper and actor (born 1994)

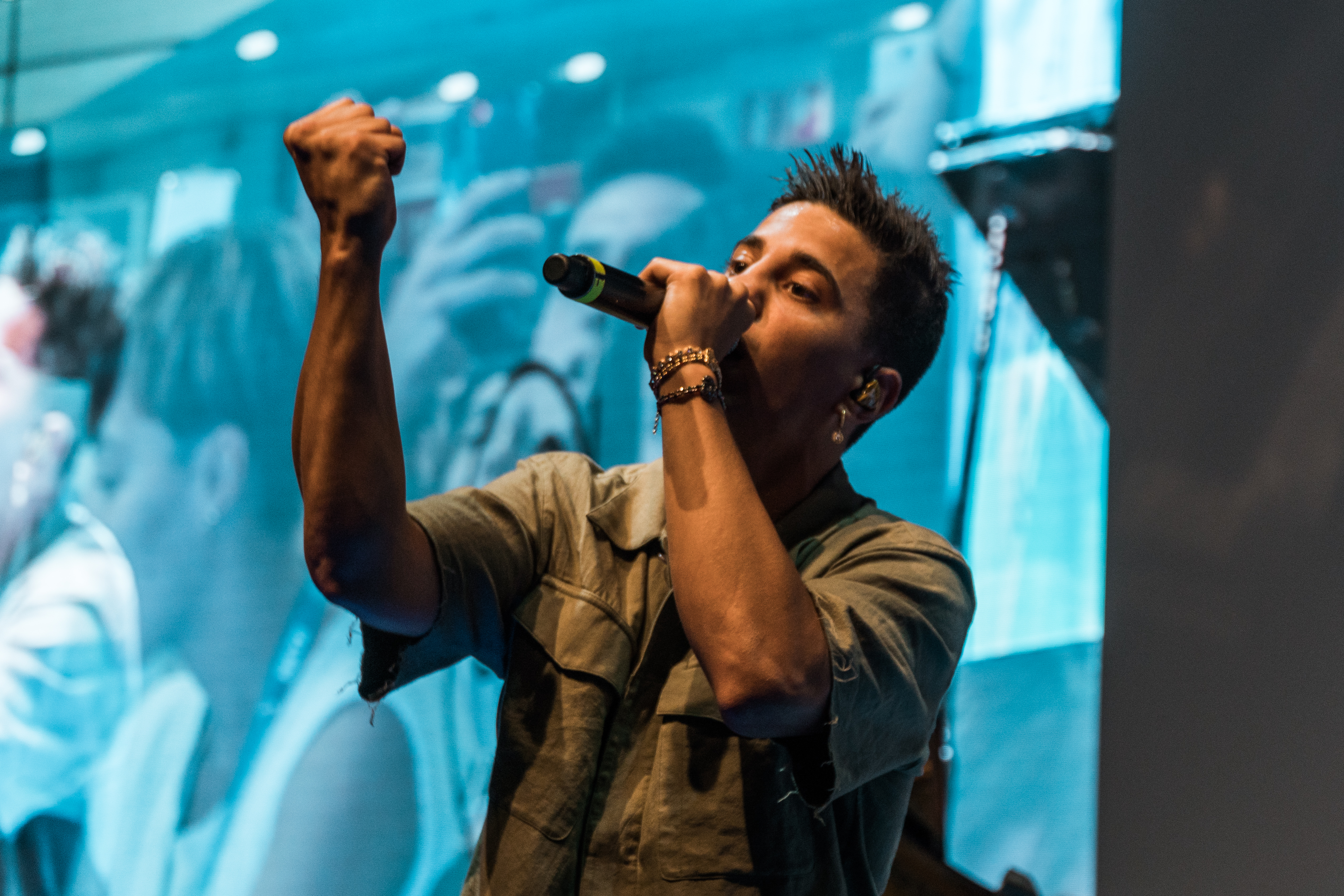
- Tedua in 2018

Background information
- Also known as: Duate
- Born: Mario Molinari; 22 February 1994 (age 32); Genova, Liguria, Italy
- Genres: Hip hop; drill; trap; pop rap; R&B
- Occupations: Rapper; singer; songwriter
- Labels: Universal Music, Sony Music

Mario Molinari (born 21 February 1994) better known professionally as Tedua, is an Italian rapper, singer, and songwriter.

Initially also known as Duate, Tedua is known as one of the members of the collective Wild Bandana, along with Izi, Vaz Té, Sangue and Ill Rave.

== Early life ==
Born in Genoa, as a child he spent some years in foster care in Milan. As a teenager he returned to Liguria, specifically to Cogoleto where he grew up. During this time, he came into contact with those who would later become the members of Wild Bandana. He also learned the saxophone. At the age of 13 in school, Molinari met Vaz Tè through whom he then met Izi. The three, who were later joined by other boys, began to dedicate themselves to music, giving themselves stage names: Molinari chose Incubo, a name he later abandoned in favor of Duate, which he then finally change into Tedua based on the riocontra, a Milanese slang that takes inspiration from verlan which involves pronouncing some words "backwards", inverting the syllables.

== Career ==
=== 2015-2017: The Orange County Trilogy ===
In 2015, Tedua returned to Milan and began writing some songs which were later compiled in his first mixtape Aspettando Orange County. Distributed for free on 15 October 2015, the album was produced by Charlie Charles, Sick Luke and Chris Nolan; it anticipated the subsequent mixtape Orange County Mixtape which was released on 30 June 2016. It contains 21 tracks produced by the aforementioned Charlie Charles, Sick Luke and Chris Nolan and has collaborations with artists such as Sfera Ebbasta, Ghali, Rkomi, Izi and Vaz Tè.

The Orange County cycle ended with the release of his first studio album Orange County California, as Tedua himself confirmed in an interview for the magazine Sto. Released by Universal Music on 13 January 2017, this was a new edition of the "Orange County Mixtape" with the addition of six previously unreleased tracks; Orange County California was later certified double platinum by the Federazione Industria Musicale Italiana for over 100,000 copies sold.

Tedua, in an interview with Rolling Stone, stated that the mixtape cycle draws inspiration from the American TV drama The O.C., set in Orange County: the rapper identifies himself with the character of Ryan Atwood, a restless boy who moved from the city of Chino to Orange County, as Tedua did moving from Cogoleto to Milan.

In March 2017, he appeared as a guest artist in the single "Bimbi" by Charlie Charles, together with Izi, Rkomi, Sfera Ebbasta and Ghali. After the collaboration with the Wild Bandana artists for the project Amici mie, mixtape published on 9 May 2017, Tedua released the song "Wasabi 2.0" ten days later (an allusion to the previous piece "Wasabi Freestyle", contained in Orange County Mixtape). It was produced by Chris Nolan, with whom the rapper undertakes an artistic partnership. Its music video was made available on YouTube the following May 22.

=== 2017-2019: Mowgli ===
On 20 November 2017, after announcing the intention to release a second studio album, Tedua released the first single of the album "La legge del più forte", followed by the second single "Burnout" which was released on 6 February 2018. The album, titled Mowgli, was released on March 2 and was positively received by critics, who recognized its innovation compared to both the trap sounds of albums such as Rockstar by Sfera Ebbasta and the sounds of classic hip hop. Supported by the radio singles "Acqua (malpensandoti)" and "Vertigini", the album also achieved good success in terms of sales, reaching the top of the FIMI album chart, and subsequently received the Premio Lunezia for its musical-literary value.

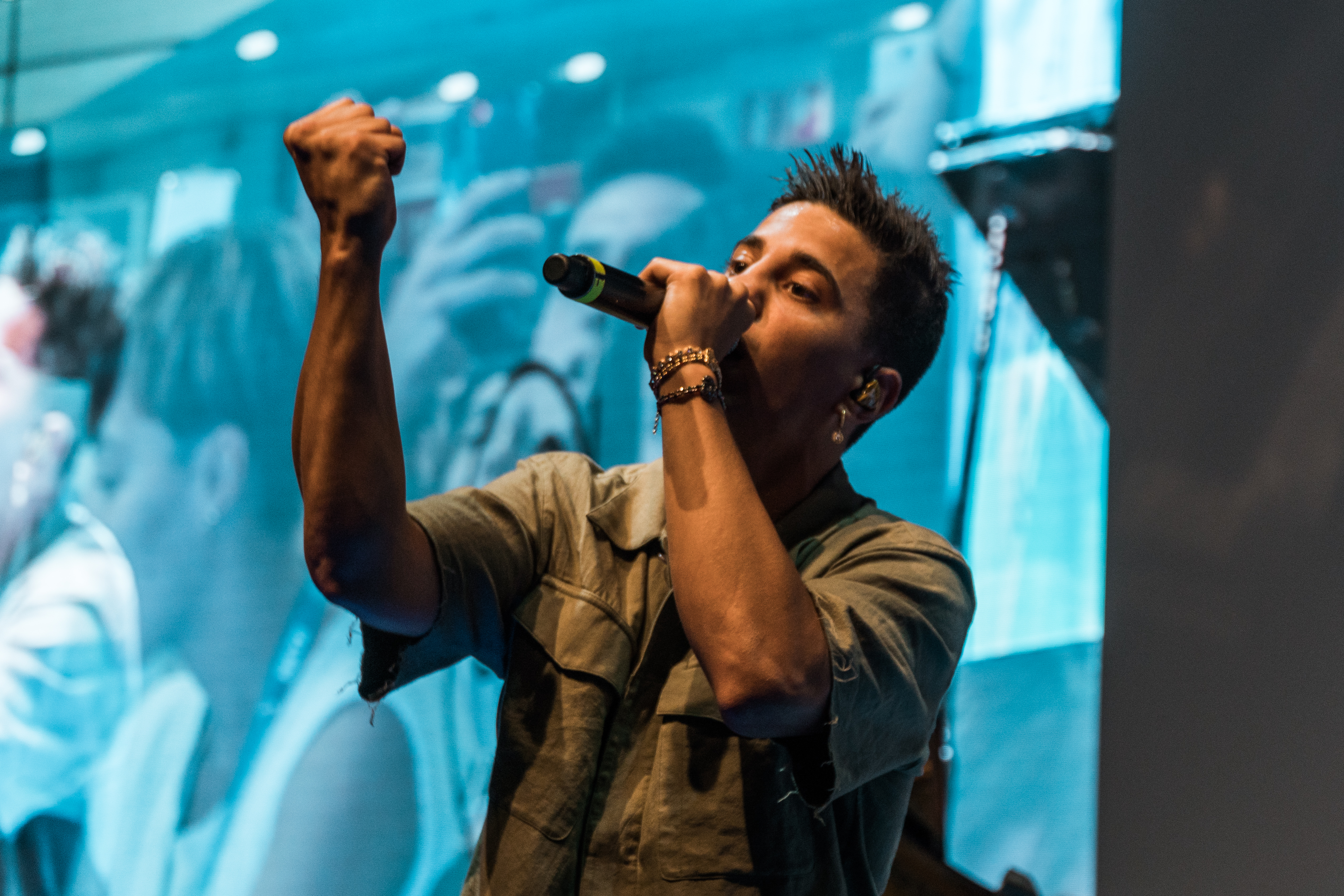
Tedua in Bologna, 2018

In 2018, he contributed to the creation of songs such as "Bro" by Ernia and "Solletico" by Rkomi, while also publishing the single "Fashion Week RMX" in collaboration with the French rapper Sofiane. In 2019, he collaborated for the first time with Fedez on the single "Che cazzo ridi", which also saw the participation of the American rapper Trippie Redd. In 2019, Tedua released the exclusive solo single "Elisir", which preceded the promotional summer tour Rumble in the Jungle.

=== 2019-2021: Vita vera, Don't Panic and the Pandemic ===
On 14 January 2019, during the penultimate concert of the Mowgli Winter Tour held in Florence, Tedua declared that he had almost completed the production of his third studio album. On 2 January 2020, he published the video for the song "2020 Freestyle" on his Instagram, in which he previewed the album's release, originally scheduled for later that year. However, following the restrictive measures stemming from the COVID-19 pandemic, Tedua declared that he could not release his album due to a disagreement with the record label related to the impossibility of subsequent touring and in-store purchases.

In June 2020, the rapper released the mixtapes Vita vera mixtape and Vita vera mixtape: attesa la Divina Commedia, which were released within a week of each other. Both albums feature the participation of various artists, such as Capo Plaza, Dargen D'Amico, Ghali and Shiva, and have achieved good commercial success, both debuting at first place on the FIMI Chart Album.

In 2021, he released the EP Don't Panic consisting of seven songs in freestyle and drill style. He then collaborated with Fedez on the single "Sapore", included in Fedez's sixth album Inhuman. This track reached second place on the Italian singles chart.

=== 2022-2024: Film debut and La Divina Commedia ===
In 2022, Tedua was a protagonist in the documentary La nuova scuola genovese by Claudio Cabona, directed by Yuri Dellacasa and Paolo Fossati, which narrates the common thread that links Ligurian singer-songwriters to the hip hop scene that has been established since the 2000s. In the same year, he also appeared in the film L'ombra di Caravaggio by Michele Placido. On December 6, the rapper returned to release music with the single "Lo-fi for U", produced by Shune. The song pays homage to the colleagues who accompanied him during the early years of his career, namely the rappers of "Bimbi", a single by producer Charlie Charles with rappers Izi, Rkomi, Sfera Ebbasta and Ghali (as well as Tedua himself). Tedua therefore returned to the scene after a period that he defined as one of transition and reflection, in which he dedicated himself to other professional and personal projects, after being greatly affected by the pandemic and the restrictions of releasing his most anticipated album.

On 17 March 2023, Tedua collaborated with Thasup on the single "Dimmi che c'è", taken from the reissue of Thasup's album Carattere speciale. In May, he announced his third studio album La Divina Commedia, which was released on June 2. The single "Intro la Divina Commedia", taken from the album, was released on May 30 together with the tracklist, which includes the aforementioned track "Lo-fi for U" and collaborations with various artists. These include: Baby Gang, Kid Yugi, Sfera Ebbasta, Salmo and Federica Abbate, Geolier, Lazza, Guè, Marracash, Bnkr44, Rkomi and Bresh. La Divina Commedia achieved immediate commercial success, debuting at the top of the FIMI Album Chart and being certified platinum at the end of the year. Also, during the first week of the album's release, eight of its sixteen songs occupied the Top 10 of the singles chart (with "Hoe" taking the top spot), while the remaining seven unreleased songs positioned themselves in the top thirty ("Lo-fi for U", which had reached the ninth position at the time of its release, rose to the thirty-second spot). Two weeks after the album's release, on June 16, the track "Red Light" was sent to Italian radio stations as the third single. The album was promoted by a series of concerts held during the summer, followed by an official album tour in the fall season. All the show dates were sold out quickly.

On November 28, Tedua released the single "Parole vuote (la solitudine)" with Capo Plaza, the first extract from the Paradiso edition of La Divina Commedia, made available on 24 May 2024. The following summer, another tour took place in support of the project (the Paradiso Tour), whose first show was in San Siro, Milan as part of the annual Independent Days Festival. "Beatrice", a collaboration with singer Annalisa, was released as the last radio excerpt from La Divina Commedia in September 2024.

Between 2023 and 2024, he also joined several colleagues as a featuring artist, including Sfera Ebbasta in "Momenti no" along with Massimo Pericolo and Kid Yugi respectively on the radio singles "Straniero" and "Eva". Meanwhile, Tedua's artistic partnership with the American photographer David LaChapelle continued, the latter authoring all three covers created for La Divina Commedia: Tedua was also chosen as the protagonist of LaChapelle's exhibition Stations of the Cross which focused on the Via Crucis.

=== 2025-present: Ryan Ted ===
On 27 October 2025, Tedua returned to the scene with the single "Chuniri", accompanied by its related music video. On 22 May 2026, to celebrate ten years of his career, Tedua released the mixtape Ryan Ted. The project, which debuted at the top of the FIMI Album Chart, contains collaborations with Latrelle, Nerissima Serpe, Anna, Ernia and Sayf and was preceded by the singles "Chuniri" and "Letter to Tedua".

On June 24, again on the occasion of his tenth anniversary, Tedua held a concert at the San Siro stadium in Milan. The sold-out event saw the participation of numerous artists with whom Tedua had collaborated with throughout his career, including Rkomi, Sfera Ebbasta, Bresh, Kid Yugi, Capo Plaza, Lazza and Annalisa.

== Musical style and influences ==
Tedua's musical style is a unique and complex phenomenon in the Italian rap scene, founded on a balance between an almost jazz-like vocal technique and an autobiographical lyrical depth. The most distinctive and, in some ways, revolutionary element is his acrobatic and syncopated flow. Tedua does not strictly adhere to a traditional meter, but uses rhythm in an extremely personal way, often giving the impression of rapping discontinuously or "out of time" with the beat. This characteristic, which earned him some initial criticism, is actually a deliberate stylistic choice: the rapper plays with pauses, accelerations, and accents, creating a dreamlike stream-of-consciousness effect.

From the perspective of music genres, Tedua is an artist who is constantly evolving despite having solid roots. He was one of the pioneers of trap and drill in Italy alongside raw and nihilistic rap subgenres, since the days of his crew Wild Bandana. His sounds, however, respond to the stream of consciousness that underlies his music, which is always a verbal expression of his thoughts and life experiences. In fact, Tedua is skilled at recounting his difficult personal story, between childhood in foster homes and neighborhood life, with a combination of sincerity and cultured references. He uses complex metaphors and cinematic or literary references—such as the world of Orange County or, more recently, Dante Alighieri's cosmology—to give a universal framework to his private experiences. This ability to balance street credibility with refined stylistic technique has established him as one of the most influential and original artists on the scene. Furthermore, he has also been able to integrate his sounds with the melancholy of Lofi hip-hop, a choice that, thanks to producers such as Chris Nolan and Shune, has allowed him to explore more introspective and melodic atmospheres. Recently, especially within La Divina Commedia, he has also tried his hand at more melodic and radio-friendly sounds, actually getting closer to pop, without distorting his style or his being. This, however, has earned him some criticism, especially from his more traditional and long-standing fans.

As for his inspirations, Tedua has often stated that he was stylistically inspired by the Italian rapper Dargen D'Amico, from whom he inherited the vision of music as a stream of consciousness. It is no coincidence that the album Mowgli contains a track "Acqua" whose chorus is a reprise of the song "Malpensandoti" by D'Amico. He sees old school hip hop as his true training "audiobooks", citing artists like Guè and Club Dogo. Tedua was introduced to the world of hip Hop also because of the records his mother gave him, including classics such as Eminem's The Eminem Show, 50 Cent's Get Rich or Die Tryin', and Gemelli DiVersi. In more recent rap, he has cited influential names for his aesthetic and sound, such as Young Thug, Meek Mill and, in particular, Chief Keef and Maino, from whom he absorbed the themes of American drill.

== Discography ==
=== As a soloist ===
==== Studio albums ====
List of studio albums, with chart positions and certifications
Title	Details	Peak chart positions		Certifications
Title	Details	ITA	SWI	Certifications
Orange County California	Released: 13 January 2017; Label: Universal Music Italy; Format: CD, digital download	6	—	FIMI: 3× Platinum
Mowgli	Released: 2 March 2018; Label: Universal Music Italy; Format: CD, LP, digital download	1	—	FIMI: 3× Platinum
La Divina Commedia	Released: 2 June 2023; Label: Universal Music Italy; Format: CD, LP, digital download	1	4	FIMI: 9× Platinum

==== Mixtapes ====
- 2014 – Medaglia d'Oro (featuring Vaz Tè)
- 2015 – Aspettando Orange County
- 2016 – Orange County Mixtape
- 2020 – Vita Vera Mixtape
- 2020 – Vita Vera Mixtape – Aspettando La Divina Commedia
- 2026 – Ryan Ted

==== Singles ====
List of singles as lead artist, with selected chart positions, showing year released and album name
Title	Year	Peak chart positions	Certifications	Album
Title	Year	ITA	Certifications	Album
"Pugile"	2016	—	FIMI: Gold	Orange County California
"Wasabi 2.0"	2017	25	FIMI: 2× Platinum	Non-album single
"La legge del più forte"	2017	4	FIMI: 2× Platinum	Mowgli
"Burnout"	2018	17	FIMI: Gold	Mowgli
"Acqua (Malpensandoti)"	2018	25	FIMI: Gold	Mowgli
"Fashion Week RMX" (featuring Sofiane)	2018	83	FIMI: Gold	Mowgli
"Vertigini"	2018	10	FIMI: 3× Platinum	Mowgli
"Elisir"	2019	5	FIMI: Gold	Non-album single
"Colori" (featuring Rkomi)	2020	7	FIMI: Gold	Vita vera mixtape
"Lo-fi for U"	2022	9	FIMI: Platinum	La Divina Commedia
"Intro La Divina Commedia"	2023	10	FIMI: Platinum	La Divina Commedia
"Red Light"	2023	6	FIMI: 2× Platinum	La Divina Commedia
"Parole vuote (La solitudine)" (featuring Capo Plaza)	2023	3	FIMI: Platinum	La Divina Commedia
"Beatrice" (featuring Annalisa)	2024	1	FIMI: 2× Platinum	La Divina Commedia
"Chuniri"	2025	12		Non-album single
"—" denotes a single that did not chart or was not released.

==== Other charted songs ====
List of other charted songs, with selected chart positions, showing year released and album name
Title	Year	Peak chart positions	Certifications	Album
Title	Year	ITA	Certifications	Album
"Lo sai"	2020	3	FIMI: Platinum	Vita vera mixtape
"Vita vera"	2020	12		Vita vera mixtape
"Polvere" (featuring Capo Plaza)	2020	2	FIMI: 2× Platinum	Vita vera mixtape
"Mare mosso" (featuring Bresh)	2020	13	FIMI: Gold	Vita vera mixtape
"Pour toujours" (featuring Ghali and Dargen D'Amico)	2020	14	FIMI: Gold	Vita vera mixtape
"Party HH" (featuring Lazza)	2020	5	FIMI: Platinum	Vita vera mixtape
"Manhattan" (featuring Izi, Vaz Tè, Guesan and Ill Rave)	2020	8	FIMI: Gold	Vita vera mixtape
"Purple"	2020	11	FIMI: Gold	Vita vera mixtape
"Bro II" (featuring Ernia)	2020	16		Vita vera mixtape
"Motivo"	2020	20		Vita vera mixtape
"Lo-fi Wuhan"	2020	19		Vita vera mixtape
"La story infinita" (featuring Massimo Pericolo)	2020	16		Vita vera mixtape: aspettando la Divina Commedia
"Rari" (featuring Shiva and Paky)	2020	7	FIMI: Gold	Vita vera mixtape: aspettando la Divina Commedia
"Rap City" (featuring Gemitaiz and MadMan)	2020	25		Vita vera mixtape: aspettando la Divina Commedia
"Clone"	2020	32		Vita vera mixtape: aspettando la Divina Commedia
"Pass" (featuring Tony Effe)	2020	30		Vita vera mixtape: aspettando la Divina Commedia
"Amico"	2020	57		Vita vera mixtape: aspettando la Divina Commedia
"Sailor Moon"	2020	46		Vita vera mixtape: aspettando la Divina Commedia
"Figghiò" (featuring Disme and Nebbia)	2020	84		Vita vera mixtape: aspettando la Divina Commedia
"2 pezzi"	2020	79		Vita vera mixtape: aspettando la Divina Commedia
"Lo-fi tu"	2020	68		Vita vera mixtape: aspettando la Divina Commedia
"Inferno"	2021	64		Don't Panic
"Badman"	2021	86		Don't Panic
"Lo-fi Drill"	2021	48	FIMI: Gold	Don't Panic
"Paradiso artificiale" (featuring Baby Gang and Kid Yugi)	2023	3	FIMI: 3× Platinum	La Divina Commedia
"Malamente"	2023	2	FIMI: 2× Platinum	La Divina Commedia
"Hoe" (featuring Sfera Ebbasta)	2023	1	FIMI: 4× Platinum	La Divina Commedia
"Angelo all'inferno" (featuring Salmo and Federica Abbate)	2023	13	FIMI: Gold	La Divina Commedia
"Mancanze affettive" (featuring Geolier)	2023	5	FIMI: Platinum	La Divina Commedia
"Volgare" (featuring Lazza)	2023	4	FIMI: Platinum	La Divina Commedia
"Scala di Milano" (featuring Guè)	2023	12	FIMI: Gold	La Divina Commedia
"Diluvio a luglio" (featuring Marracash)	2023	9	FIMI: Platinum	La Divina Commedia
"Soffierà"	2023	19	FIMI: Gold	La Divina Commedia
"La verità" (featuring Bnkr44)	2023	22	FIMI: Gold	La Divina Commedia
"Anime libere" (featuring Bresh and Rkomi)	2023	14	FIMI: Platinum	La Divina Commedia
"Bagagli (Improvvisazione)"	2023	17	FIMI: Gold	La Divina Commedia
"Outro Purgatorio"	2023	23	FIMI: Gold	La Divina Commedia
"Paradiso II"	2024	12		La Divina Commedia (Deluxe)
"Mare calmo"	2024	3	FIMI: Gold	La Divina Commedia (Deluxe)
"Al limite" (featuring Tony Boy)	2024	11		La Divina Commedia (Deluxe)
"Kill Bill"	2024	7	FIMI: Gold	La Divina Commedia (Deluxe)
"Jolly Roger" (featuring Izi, Disme, Bresh and Vaz Té)	2024	5	FIMI: Gold	La Divina Commedia (Deluxe)
"Angelo custode" (featuring Angelina Mango)	2024	19		La Divina Commedia (Deluxe)

=== With the Wild Bandana ===
- 2017 – Amici miei
- 2020 – "Manhattan" (single from Vita Vera Mixtape)

=== Collaborations ===
- "Cosa non va", Believe Music (with Disme, Tedua & Chris Nolan) 2020
- "Para'", Sony Music Italy (with Bresh & Tedua) 2020
- "Puro Sinaloa", Universal Music Italy (with Tedua, Ernia, Rkomi & Lazza) 2020
- "Dimmi Che C'è" (Thasup with Tedua) 2020

== Filmography ==
=== Film ===
Year	Title	Role(s)	Notes
2022	Caravaggio's Shadow	Cecco	
2026	Kid Yugi – Genesi e ascesa di un anti-idolo	Himself	Documentary
