= Disco Paradise =

Single by Fedez, Annalisa and Articolo 31
- Released: 25 May 2023
- Genre: Dance pop
- Length: 3:18
- Label: Warner Music Italy
- Songwriters: Federico Lucia; Annalisa Scarrone; Alessandro Aleotti; Vito Perrini; Paolo Antonacci; Wladimiro Perrini; Davide Simonetta
- Producer: Davide Simonetta

Fedez singles chronology
"Crisi di stato" (2022)	"Disco Paradise" (2023)	"Sexy Shop" (2024)

Annalisa singles chronology
"Mon amour" (2023)	"Disco Paradise" (2023)	"Ragazza sola" (2023)

Articolo 31 singles chronology
"Filosofia del fuck off" (2023)	"Disco Paradise" (2023)	"Classico" (2023)

Music video
- "Disco Paradise" on YouTube

"Disco Paradise" is a song by Italian rapper Fedez, Italian singer Annalisa and Italian rap duo Articolo 31, released by Warner Music Italy on 25 May 2023.

It was written by the four artists with co-writing contribution by Davide Simonetta, Paolo Antonacci and Wladimiro Perrini, and produced by Simonetta. The song peaked at number three on the Italian FIMI Singles Chart.

== Music video ==
A music video to accompany the release of "Disco Paradise", directed by Olmo Parenti, was released on YouTube on 29 June 2023.

== Charts ==
=== Weekly charts ===
Weekly chart performance for "Disco Paradise"
Chart (2023)	Peak position
Italy (FIMI)	3
Italy Airplay (EarOne)	1
Poland (Polish Airplay Top 100)	42
Switzerland (Schweizer Hitparade)	88

=== Year-end charts ===
2023 year-end chart performance for "Disco Paradise"
Chart (2023)	Position
Italy (FIMI)	12

2024 year-end chart performance for "Disco Paradise"
Chart (2024)	Position
Italy (FIMI)	94

== Certifications ==
Certifications for "Disco Paradise"
Region	Certification	Certified units/sales
Italy (FIMI)	5× Platinum	500,000^{‡}
Poland (ZPAV)	Gold	25,000^{‡}
^{‡} Sales+streaming figures based on certification alone.
