= Il diluvio universale (song) =

Single by Annalisa

from the album Se avessi un cuore
- Released: 11 February 2016
- Genre: Pop
- Length: 3:24
- Label: Warner Music Italy
- Songwriters: Annalisa Scarrone; Diego Calvetti
- Producer: Diego Calvetti

Annalisa singles chronology
"Splende" (2015)	"Il diluvio universale" (2016)	"Se avessi un cuore" (2016)

Music video
- "Il diluvio universale" on YouTube

"Il diluvio universale" (lit. 'The great flood') is a song co-written and recorded by Italian singer Annalisa. It was written by Annalisa and Diego Calvetti, and produced by Calvetti. The song was released by Warner Music Italy on 11 February 2016 as the lead single from her fifth studio album Se avessi un cuore.

The song was the Annalisa's entry for the Sanremo Music Festival 2016, where it placed eleventh in the grand final. "Il diluvio universale" peaked at number 25 on the FIMI Singles Chart.

== Music video ==
The music video of "Il diluvio universale", directed by Gaetano Morbioli, was released onto YouTube on 11 February 2016.

== Track listing ==
Digital download
No.	Title	Length
1.	"Il diluvio universale"	3:24

== Charts ==
Chart performance for "Il diluvio universale"
Chart (2016)	Peak position
Italy (FIMI)	25
