= Se avessi un cuore (song) =

Single by Annalisa

from the album Se avessi un cuore
- Released: 15 April 2016
- Genre: Electropop
- Length: 2:54
- Label: Warner Music Italy
- Songwriters: Annalisa Scarrone; Davide Simonetta
- Producer: Fabrizio Ferraguzzo

Annalisa singles chronology
"Il diluvio universale" (2016)	"Se avessi un cuore" (2016)	"Used to You/Potrei abituarmi" (2016)

Music video
- "Se avessi un cuore" on YouTube

"Se avessi un cuore" (Italian for 'If I had a heart') is a song by co-written and recorded by Italian singer Annalisa. It was released on 15 April 2016 through Warner Music Italy, as the second single from her fifth studio album with the same name. It was written by Annalisa with co-writing contribution by Davide Simonetta.

The song peaked at number 50 on the Italian singles chart.

== Music video ==
A music video to accompany the release of "Se avessi un cuore", directed by Gaetano Morbioli, was released onto YouTube on 26 April 2016.

== Charts ==
Weekly chart performance for "Se avessi un cuore"
Chart (2016)	Peak position
Italy (FIMI)	50

== Certifications ==
Region	Certification	Certified units/sales
Italy (FIMI)	Gold	25,000^{‡}
^{‡} Sales+streaming figures based on certification alone.
