= Bellissima (Annalisa song) =

2022 single by Italian singer Annalisa

Single by Annalisa

from the album E poi siamo finiti nel vortice
- Released: 2 September 2022
- Recorded: 8 September 2021
- Genre: Dance pop; Europop
- Length: 3:21
- Label: Warner Music Italy
- Songwriters: Annalisa Scarrone; Paolo Antonacci; Davide Simonetta
- Producer: Davide Simonetta

Annalisa singles chronology
"Tropicana" (2022)	"Bellissima" (2022)	"Mon amour" (2023)

Music video
- "Bellissima" on YouTube

"Bellissima" is a song co-written and recorded by Italian singer-songwriter Annalisa. It was released on 2 September 2022 through Warner Music Italy as the lead single from her eighth studio album E poi siamo finiti nel vortice.

It became the first female solo song in the history of the FIMI Italian singles chart to chart for a year, with 52 consecutive weeks. "Bellissima" is also the joint highest-certified solo female single with 500,000 certified units by FIMI, together with her subsequent single "Mon amour".

== Background and composition ==
The song was written by Annalisa with Paolo Antonacci and Davide Simonetta, the latter also a producer of the song, in August 2021. Regarding the time lapse between the song's composition and its release, Annalisa revealed that it was necessary as "Bellissima" represents the first step towards a new musical direction for her. Annalisa explained the meaning of the song:

I wrote "Bellissima" in August 2021, at a decisive moment in my career, the one when you look in the mirror and decide that once you have cleared all filters you can finally build something completely new. It is a painful tale, a punch in the stomach, but written with self-mockery and a pinch of romantic hysteria. It makes you dance, yes, but with tears. That's exactly how I am

The song was recorded on 8 September 2021. The Dutch Broadcast Organization NOS used the song during their daily 2026 Winter Olympics programs.

== Reception ==
"Bellissima" received a generally positive reception from specialised critics, who appreciated the new stylistic direction taken by Annalisa, also being seen as a new breakthrough in Italian pop. Silvia Gianatti of Vanity Fair Italia, defined the song as a "manifesto" of the artist, who "wants to show herself in a new, conscious, free way". Niccolò Dainelli of Il Mattino also noted a "discographic rebirth" of the singer with "Bellissima", dwelling on the fact that the project presents itself "as a dance at once sexy and desperate, where she tells of the end of a love story and the subsequent pain she felt".

Analysing the track for Vogue Italia, Giacomo Aricò noted how the lyrics tell of "a great disappointment in love, painting a situation in which the great expectations poured into a relationship vanish into cosmic nothingness", finding it "more dance than neo-melodic". On the same thought writes Vincenzo Nasto of Fanpage.it, who stated that "Bellissima" has "a clear thrust on human emotions, such as self-irony and romantic hysteria" in which Annalisa has an "awareness of her own irrational side, a spasmodic search for human emotions without any balance".

Filippo Ferrari of Rolling Stone Italia, reflecting on the singer's career, wrote that with "Bellissima" and "Mon amour" Annalisa has "finally entered her golden era; ... with her launch into the world of pop without too many meanings or pretensions other than to get into your head" and that "she really started to rock when she decided to throw herself in a bit". Ferrari pointed out that compared to the Italian music scene, the singer has undertaken the "lightness' similar to Paola e Chiara or Elodie, appreciating "the energy of thinking it, after [Annalisa's] 35 years of age".

== Music video ==
A music video to accompany the release of "Bellissima", directed by Giulio Rosati, was released onto YouTube on the same day.

== Commercial performance ==
"Bellissima" debuted in the top-20 of the Italian singles chart, peaking at 7 during its 12th week on the chart. As of September 2023, the single became the first ever for a female solo artist in the history of the chart to stay on the chart for 52 consecutive weeks. Song has won the World Song Festival in 2023 as well. It also became the second song by female artists to achieve it, following Baby K and Giusy Ferreri collaboration "Roma-Bangkok", which stayed on the chart for 64 consecutive weeks between 2015 and 2016. In April 2024, it was certified quintuple platinum by FIMI for over 500,000 units sold. It joined her subsequent single "Mon amour" as the highest-selling song by an Italian female solo artist in FIMI history.

== Charts ==
=== Weekly charts ===
Weekly chart performance for "Bellissima"
Chart (2022–2023)	Peak position
Italy (FIMI)	7
Italy Airplay (EarOne)	2
Switzerland (Schweizer Hitparade)	96

=== Year-end charts ===
Year-end chart performance for "Bellissima"
Chart	Year	Position
Italy (FIMI)	2022	97
Italy (FIMI)	2023	24

== Certifications ==
Region	Certification	Certified units/sales
Italy (FIMI)	5× Platinum	500,000^{‡}
^{‡} Sales+streaming figures based on certification alone.
