= Euforia (song) =

Single by Annalisa

from the album E poi siamo finiti nel vortice
- Released: 17 November 2023
- Genre: Synth pop
- Length: 3:00
- Label: Warner Music Italy
- Songwriters: Annalisa Scarrone; Paolo Antonacci; Davide Simonetta
- Producer: Davide Simonetta

Annalisa singles chronology
"Ragazza sola" (2023)	"Euforia" (2023)	"Christmas (Baby Please Come Home)" (2023)

Music video
- "Euforia" on YouTube

"Euforia" (Italian for 'Euphoria') is a song co-written and recorded by Italian singer-songwriter Annalisa. It was released on 17 November 2023 through Warner Music Italy, as the fourth single from her eighth studio album E poi siamo finiti nel vortice.

== Composition ==
The song was written by Annalisa herself in collaboration with Paolo Antonacci and Davide Simonetta, the idea behind which is the result of a stream of consciousness. Annalisa explained the meaning of the song, stating that it "is representative of when you start a new journey, a new path and you're there looking forward to what the future holds." In an interview with Rolling Stone Italia she told that the song represents the phase of life related to the release of the album from which it is extracted.

== Critical reception ==
Reviewing the album for Ondarock, Claudio Fabretti wrote that Euforia is a "dancefloor novelty with a straight bass drum and explained beats," with lyrics with "vaguely surreal verses in the stanzas, [...] which however clash with the more puerile ones in the refrain," likening them to those of Bellissima. Fabio Fiume of All Music Italia also associated the two tracks, writing that Euphoria and La Crisi A Saint-Tropez "while catchy and dramatically radio-friendly do not enjoy the novelty effect benefited a year ago in the launch of the single." Claudio Cabona of Rockol stated that "the song is to live on the track, another potential hit."

== Music video ==
A music video to accompany the release of "Euforia", directed and edited by Dario Garegnani, was released onto YouTube on 17 November 2023.

== Charts ==
Weekly chart performance for "Euforia"
Chart (2024)	Peak position
Italy (FIMI)	19
Italy Airplay (EarOne)	2
San Marino (SMRRTV Top 50)	2

== Certifications ==
Certifications for "Euforia"
Region	Certification	Certified units/sales
Italy (FIMI)	Platinum	100,000^{‡}
^{‡} Sales+streaming figures based on certification alone.
