= Mon amour (Annalisa song) =

2023 single by Italian singer Annalisa

Single by Annalisa

from the album E poi siamo finiti nel vortice
- Released: 31 March 2023
- Genre: Dance pop
- Length: 3:23
- Label: Warner Music Italy
- Songwriters: Annalisa Scarrone; Paolo Antonacci; Davide Simonetta
- Producers: Davide Simonetta; Zef

Annalisa singles chronology
"Bellissima" (2022)	"Mon amour" (2023)	"Disco Paradise" (2023)

Music video
- "Mon amour" on YouTube

"Mon amour" (French for 'My Love') is a song co-written and recorded by Italian singer-songwriter Annalisa. It was released on 31 March 2023 through Warner Music Italy, as the second single from her eighth studio album E poi siamo finiti nel vortice.

The song peaked at number 1 on the Italian singles chart, becoming Annalisa's first number one record and becoming the first Italian solo female artist to reach number one in the singles chart since 2020.

== Background and composition ==
Annalisa described the song as the next chapter of the story that started with "Bellissima", focusing on "the state of limbo that comes after the disappointment of a failed relationship and before the readiness to start over and move on". "Mon amour" explores the "recklessness" of this limbo, with the "crazy idea of revenge that makes you feel powerful again, even if only for an instant". It was written by Annalisa, Davide Simonetta and Paolo Antonacci, and produced by Simonetta and Zef.

== Reception ==
Vincenzo Nasto of Fanpage.it described the single as "a hymn to freedom and passions" related to both "dancefloor desires" and "carnal passion, with a hint of irony". Alessandro Alicandri of TV Sorrisi e Canzoni wrote that the track was "born without this performance anxiety" compared to the previous single, with a "lightness that serves to displace once again", thanks to the sounds made of a "persuasive club intro" and a "fascinating mix of Latin pop and French house sounds". Claudio Cabona of Rockol described it as a song with a "sexy and energetic atmosphere" with "90s pop sounds, but also a contemporary sound", believing that "Annalisa has never been more confident in her potential".

All Music Italia's Fabio Fiume gave "Mon amour" a score of 6+/10, pointing out how "it is less memorable, less hypnotic" compared to the previous single "Bellissima". Fiume also found that the singer's voice had been "exploited differently; ... the virtuosities are in fact reduced to the bone", adding the dynamic of the song is also "tense, without drops in intensity". Gabriele Fazio of Agenzia Giornalistica Italia was also not particularly impressed by the song, believing that "nothing remotely artistic is perceived" as it is dedicated to "a disinterested and superficial audience" becoming "just another hit, one of those that does not want to communicate anything".

== Music video ==
A music video to accompany the release of "Mon amour", directed by Giulio Rosati, was released onto YouTube on 5 April 2023. The video depicts Annalisa with a new haircut and style, which Annalisa described as emblematic of periods of change, representing "a break from self-reflection and the adoption of an alter-ego".

== Commercial performance ==
"Mon amour" debuted at number 26 on the Italian singles chart. It reached number five two weeks later, becoming the singer's eleventh song to reach the top ten and her fourth to reach the top five. After spending two weeks at number three and three weeks at number two, the song peaked at number one on the chart in its ninth week. "Mon amour" became the first song by Annalisa to reach the top of the singles chart, making her the first Italian female solo artist to achieve this since Anna in 2020 with "Bando". The single saw continued success throughout 2023, remaining in the top ten of the Italian singles chart for 20 weeks and becoming the seventh biggest selling song of the year in Italy, the highest by a woman soloist. The song also topped the Italian airplay chart.

The song was a prominent hit of summer 2023, with Spotify naming it the eighth most streamed song of the summer in Italy on the platform. At RTL's Power Hits Estate 2023, "Mon amour" was awarded the SIAE prize for the most performed song of the summer at Italian musical events. The song achieved viral success on TikTok, featuring in over 700,000 videos in 2023 and becoming the most used song of the year in Italy on the app. "Mon amour" was certified five times platinum in Italy, for sales exceeding 500,000 copies.

== Charts ==
=== Weekly charts ===
Weekly chart performance for "Mon amour"
Chart (2023)	Peak position
Italy (FIMI)	1
Italy Airplay (EarOne)	1

=== Year-end charts ===
2023 year-end chart performance for "Mon amour"
Chart (2023)	Position
Italy (FIMI)	7

2024 year-end chart performance for "Mon amour"
Chart (2024)	Position
Italy (FIMI)	72

== Certifications ==
Region	Certification	Certified units/sales
Italy (FIMI)	6× Platinum	600,000^{‡}
^{‡} Sales+streaming figures based on certification alone.
