= Fanpage.it =

Italian online newspaper

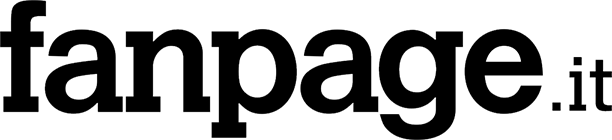
- Type: Daily newspaper
- Founder: Gianluca Cozzolino
- Editor: Ciaopeople S.r.l.
- Deputy editor: Adriano Biondi; Francesco Cancellato
- Founded: 26 July 2011
- Language: Italian
- Headquarters: Naples
- Country: Italy
- Website: fanpage.it

Fanpage.it is an online newspaper based in Naples, Italy, belonging to the publishing group Ciaopeople media group and directed by Francesco Cancellato. The Guardian described it as "one of Italy's most successful news sites".

== History ==
Fanpage.it was born in January 2010 on the initiative of the Ciaopeople publishing group. The magazine was registered at the Court of Naples on July 26, 2011 on the initiative of its founder Gianluca Cozzolino. Initially active through thematic channels, Fanpage.it was born in November 2011. The individual thematic vertical magazines were then combined under a single generalist head.

The first responsible editor was Giovanni Carzana, member of the Ciaopeople team since the conception and design of the newspaper in 2009. His experience lasted from July 2011 to May 2012, when the publishing company entrusted the role of director to Pietro Rinaldi, who led the newspaper from May 2012 to 2013. From 2013 the management passed under the aegis of Francesco Piccinini.

In June 2012, Youmedia was born, a video platform of the newspaper and the only Italian media in Ultra HD 4K, important because it was celebrated through the video "Naples in 4k", used by the United Nations for the "Voices Against Crime" campaign. In May 2015, a second office of the Fanpage editorial office was opened in Milan, which also hosts Ciaopeople Advertising, the commercial management of the Ciaopeople group.
