= L'ultimo addio =

Single by Annalisa

from the album Splende
- Released: 19 September 2014
- Genre: Pop
- Length: 3:36
- Label: Warner Music Italy
- Songwriters: Annalisa Scarrone; Diego Calvetti; Francesco Sighieri
- Producers: Kekko Silvestre; Diego Calvetti

Annalisa singles chronology
"Sento solo il presente" (2014)	"L'ultimo addio" (2014)	"Dimenticare (mai)" (2014)

Music video
- "L'ultimo addio" on YouTube

"L'ultimo addio" (lit. 'The Last Farewell') is a song co-written and recorded by Italian singer Annalisa. It was released by Warner Music Italy on 19 September 2014 as the second single from her fourth studio album Splende.

It was written by Annalisa, Diego Calvetti and Francesco Sighieri, and produced by Calvetti and Modà's frontman Kekko Silvestre.

The song peaked at number 27 on the FIMI Singles Chart and was certified gold in Italy.

== Music video ==
A music video to accompany the release of "L'ultimo addio" was released onto YouTube on 7 October 2014. It was directed by Gaetano Morbioli and shot in Varigotti, Liguria.

== Track listing ==
Digital download
No.	Title	Length
1.	"L'ultimo addio"	3:36

== Charts ==
Chart performance for "L'ultimo addio"
Chart (2014)	Peak position
Italy (FIMI)	27

== Certifications ==
Region	Certification	Certified units/sales
Italy (FIMI)	Gold	15,000^{‡}
^{‡} Sales+streaming figures based on certification alone.
