= Viva la Diva =

Viva la Diva may refer to:

- Viva la Diva, an adaptation and English translation by Kit Hesketh-Harvey of Donizetti's opera Le convenienze ed inconvenienze teatrali (also previously updated as Viva la Mamma), first performed at the Buxton International Festival in July 2022.
- Viva la Diva, Jelena Karleusa concert
- Viva la Diva (Darcey Bussell and Katherine Jenkins), a concert series by Darcey Bussell and Katherine Jenkins
- Viva la Diva - A Night at the Opera with Lesley Garrett, a concert by Lesley Garrett
- Viva la Diva, an album by Rocío Jurado
- Viva la Diva: the Best of, an album by Montserrat Caballé
- Viva la Diva, an album by Yuri
- Viva la Diva, a video by Ednita Nazario

== See also ==
- Viva La Vida
