= Una finestra tra le stelle =

Single by Annalisa

from the album Splende
- Released: 11 February 2015
- Genre: Pop
- Length: 3:31
- Label: Warner Music Italy
- Songwriter: Francesco Silvestre
- Producer: Enrico Palmosi

Annalisa singles chronology
"Dimenticare (mai)" (2014)	"Una finestra tra le stelle" (2015)	"Vincerò" (2015)

Music video
- "Una finestra tra le stelle" on YouTube

"Una finestra tra le stelle" (lit. 'A window among the stars') is a song recorded by Italian singer Annalisa, released by Warner Music Italy on 11 February 2015 as the third single from her fourth studio album Splende.. It was written by Modà's frontman Francesco Silvestre, and produced by Enrico Palmosi.

The song served as Annalisa's entry for the Sanremo Music Festival 2015, where it placed fourth in the grand final rank. "Una finestra tra le stelle" peaked at number 5 on the FIMI Singles Chart and was certified platinum in Italy.

== Music video ==
A music video to accompany the release of "Una finestra tra le stelle" was then released onto YouTube on 11 February 2015. The video was directed by Gaetano Morbioli and shot inside Villa Mosconi Bertani in Negrar di Valpolicella, Veneto.

== Track listing ==
Digital download
No.	Title	Length
1.	"Una finestra tra le stelle"	3:31

== Charts ==
Chart performance for "Una finestra tra le stelle"
Chart (2015)	Peak position
Italy (FIMI)	5

== Certifications ==
Region	Certification	Certified units/sales
Italy (FIMI)	Platinum	50,000^{‡}
^{‡} Sales+streaming figures based on certification alone.
