= Splende (song) =

Single by Annalisa

from the album Splende
- Released: 18 September 2015
- Genre: Pop rock
- Length: 3:24
- Label: Warner Music Italy
- Songwriters: Annalisa Scarrone; Francesco Sighieri; Diego Calvetti
- Producer: Kekko Silvestre

Annalisa singles chronology
"Vincerò" (2015)	"Splende" (2015)	"Il diluvio universale" (2016)

Music video
- "Splende" on YouTube

"Splende" (Italian for 'It shines') is a song co-written and recorded by Italian singer Annalisa. It was released on 18 September 2015 through Warner Music Italy, as the fifth single from her fourth studio album by the same name.

The song peaked at number 24 on the Italian singles chart.

== Music video ==
A music video to accompany the release of "Splende", directed by Gaetano Morbioli, was released onto YouTube on 30 September 2015.

== Charts ==
Weekly chart performance for "Splende"
Chart (2015)	Peak position
Italy (FIMI)	24

== Certifications ==
Region	Certification	Certified units/sales
Italy (FIMI)	Gold	25,000^{‡}
^{‡} Sales+streaming figures based on certification alone.
