= Vincerò (song) =

Single by Annalisa

from the album Splende
- Released: 15 May 2015
- Length: 3:21
- Label: Warner Music Italy
- Songwriters: Annalisa Scarrone; Cosimo Angiuli; Fabio Campedelli; Emiliano Cecere
- Producer: Kekko Silvestre

Annalisa singles chronology
"Una finestra tra le stelle" (2015)	"Vincerò" (2015)	"Splende" (2015)

Music video
- "Vincerò" on YouTube

"Vincerò" (Italian for 'I will win') is a song co-written and recorded by Italian singer Annalisa, released on 15 May 2015 through Warner Music Italy as the fourth single from her fourth studio album Splende.

"Vincere" was written by Annalisa with co-writing contribution by Cosimo Angiuli, Fabio Campedelli and Emiliano Cecere. The song peaked at number 52 on the Italian singles chart.

== Music video ==
A music video to accompany the release of "Vincerò", directed by Mauro Russo, was released onto YouTube on 20 May 2015.

== Charts ==
Weekly chart performance for "Vincerò"
Chart (2015)	Peak position
Italy (FIMI)	52

== Certifications ==
Region	Certification	Certified units/sales
Italy (FIMI)	Gold	25,000^{‡}
^{‡} Sales+streaming figures based on certification alone.
