= Gabriele Corsi =

Italian radio and television personality (born 1971)

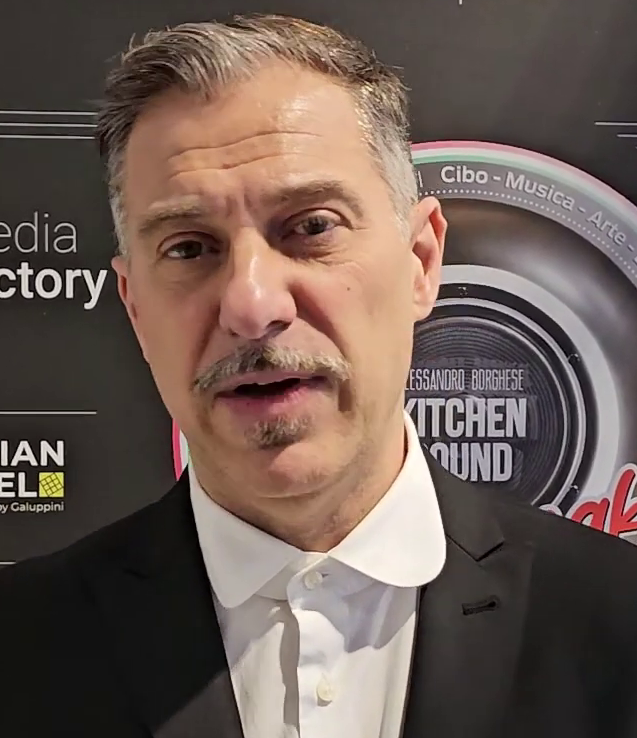
- Gabriele Corsi in 2024
- Born: Gabriele Maria Fausto Giuseppe Corsi marchese Flores d'Arcais; 29 July 1971 (age 55); Rome, Italy
- Occupations: Showman; television presenter; radio personality; comedian; actor
- Height: 1.86 m (6 ft 1 in)

Gabriele Corsi (born 29 July 1971) is an Italian showman, television presenter, radio personality, comedian and actor.

== Biography ==
Born and raised in Cinecittà, the son of a mathematics teacher and an engineer, descended from a noble family (marquises) on his grandmother's side. He graduated in 1990 from the Cavour Scientific High School in Rome; in the same year, he won the competition at the "Silvio D'Amico" Academy of Dramatic Arts, from which he was expelled for disagreements with a professor. He began a long apprenticeship in the theater and, in the same years, founded a pirate radio station called "Radio Medusa" with his friends from the Trio Medusa, during a summer vacation: in fact, the three enjoyed playing funny pranks on the frequencies of Radio Maria; however, having caused "disturbance", they received a fine from Escopost.

He played the carabiniere Michele Falcetti in the first three seasons of the television series Il maresciallo Rocca, an opportunity that was given to him after the show Il giallo è servito, which he wrote and directed. He graduated from Susan Strasberg's Actor Studio. In 1996 he graduated in political science at La Sapienza University in Rome with a grade of 108/110. At the same time he began his radio adventure as a member of the Trio Medusa. The three have been hosting Radio Deejay Chiamate Roma Triuno Triuno since 2002. From 2012 to 2020 he kept a blog for Il Fatto Quotidiano.

Since Monday 4 January 2016 he has been hosting his first solo show, Take Me Out - Esci con me, broadcast by Real Time. Given the success of the ratings, the show has landed in prime time every Tuesday at 9:00 pm on the same channel, in addition to maintaining its placement in access and having a spin-off with elderly people. He is also one of the four hosts of Ninja Warrior Italia for Nove. Starting from 7 November 2016 he has been recruited as a comedian on the program Cartabianca broadcast on Rai 3, both in the daily version and in the prime time version.

Since April 26, 2017, he has hosted Piccoli giganti in prime time on Real Time. In 2018, he hosts Boss in incognito on Rai 2 and in the summer of the same year, he is at the helm of Reazione a catena - L'intesa vincente in the pre-evening of Rai 1. Despite the presence of the World Cup on Mediaset networks, he holds the absolute record for audiences. In the fall, he hosts B come Sabato on Saturday afternoon on Rai 2 and is a guest on the Telethon marathon.

From autumn 2019, he then returns to Discovery to host the new game show Deal With It - Stai al gioco on Nove, and in 2021 the new season of Il contadino cerca moglie on the Discovery+ streaming platform. In the same year, he joins Cristiano Malgioglio in commentating on the final of the Eurovision Song Contest on Rai 1. Again with the Sicilian lyricist, he comments, in its entirety, on the Eurovision Song Contest 2022 hosted at the Palasport Olimpico in Turin. Also in 2022, after the success of the pilot series, from 5 September 2022, he hosts the new game Don't Forget the Lyrics! - Stai sul pezzo also on Nove. Since May 2022, he has been a UNICEF Goodwill Ambassador. In March 2023, he won the Telegatto. On March 28, 2023, during the Rai 2 program Stasera c'è Cattelan, Corsi announced that he would commentate the Eurovision Song Contest 2023 (third time, this time alongside Mara Maionchi), on May 9 and 11 on Rai 2 and on May 13, for the final of the event, on Rai 1; a year later, he is still confirmed to commentate the European event.

In October 2024 he published his first novel, Che bella giornata, speranza che non piova, for Cairo. The moving story of his father's illness and his experience, during his civil service, in a facility for psychiatric patients.

The poem Fammi essere ancora figlio that begins the book, read during the program In altre parole broadcast on La7, went viral and was viewed 3 million times.

From 8 to 15 February 2025, together with Bianca Guaccero and Mariasole Pollio, he was one of the hosts of PrimaFestival, on the occasion of the 75th Sanremo Festival, after being announced by Carlo Conti on 27 December 2024.

== Personal life ==
He is married to the journalist of the daily newspaper la Repubblica Laura Pertici and has two children.

== Filmography ==
=== Actor ===
==== Film ====
Year	Title	Director	Notes
2000	Alex l'ariete	Damiano Damiani	
2002	Febbre da cavallo - La mandrakata	Carlo Vanzina	With Trio Medusa
2012	10 regole per fare innamorare	Cristiano Bortone	With Trio Medusa
2024	I soliti idioti 3: Il ritorno	Francesco Mandelli, Fabrizio Biggio and Martino Ferro	With Trio Medusa

==== Television ====
Year	Title	Notes
1996–2001	Il maresciallo Rocca	TV series
2000–2001	Una donna per amico	TV series
2003	L'inganno	TV movie directed by Rossella Izzo
2008	Boris	TV series, episode 2x05, with Trio Medusa
2016	Romanzo siciliano	TV miniseries

==== Short films ====
Year	Title	Director
1997	Io e Giulia	Gabriele Muccino

=== Dubbing ===
==== Film ====
Year	Title	Notes
2009	Astro Boy	With Trio Medusa

==== Television ====
Year	Title	Notes
2005–2006	Sons of Butcher	With Trio Medusa

=== Videoclip ===
Year	Title	Artist	Notes
2006	Ombrelloni	Simone Cristicchi	With Trio Medusa
2007	Troppo Avanti	Piotta	With Trio Medusa

=== Advertising ===
Year	Title	Notes
2008	Tronky	With Trio Medusa
2020	Ferrarelle	

== Television program ==
Year	Title	Network		Role	Notes
1999–2007, 2015	Le Iene	Italia 1		Conductor	With Trio Medusa
2002	Premio italiano della musica	Italia 1		Conductor	With Trio Medusa
2008–2009	Takeshi's Castle	GXT	K2	Conductor	With Trio Medusa
2018–present	Takeshi's Castle	Comedy Central		Conductor	With Trio Medusa
2009–2010	Parla con me	Rai 3		Conductor	With Trio Medusa
2009–2010	La gaia scienza	La7		Conductor	With Trio Medusa
2009–2010	Una cena di Natale quasi perfetta	Sky Uno		Conductor	With Trio Medusa
2011–2013	Quelli che il calcio	Rai 2		Conductor	With Trio Medusa
2012	Italia Coast2Coast	Rai 2		Conductor	With Trio Medusa
2014	Zelig	Canale 5		Conductor	With Trio Medusa
2015	Trio Medusa Late Show	Italia 1		Conductor	With Trio Medusa
2016–2018	Take Me Out - Esci con me	Real Time		Conductor	
2016	Take Me Out - Party Night	Real Time		Conductor	
2016	Ninja Warrior Italia	Nove		Conductor	
2016	Take Me Out - Signore e Signori	Real Time		Conductor	
2016–2018	Cartabianca	Rai 3		Opinionist	
2017	Piccoli giganti	Real Time		Conductor	
2017	Wipeout - Pronti a tutto!	Spike		Conductor	With Trio Medusa
2018	Boss in incognito	Rai 2		Conductor	
2018	Primo appuntamento	Real Time		Conductor	
2018	Reazione a catena - L'intesa vincente	Rai 1		Conductor	
2018	B come Sabato	Rai 2		Conductor	
2018	Telethon	Rai 2		Conductor	
2019–2022	Deal With It - Stai al gioco	Nove		Conductor	
2020–2021	Amore in quarantena	Rai 1		Conductor	With Trio Medusa
2021–present	Il contadino cerca moglie	Nove		Conductor	
2021–present	Eurovision Song Contest	Rai 1		Commentator	
2023–present	Eurovision Song Contest	Rai 2		Commentator	
2021	Prodigi - La musica è vita	Rai 1		Conductor	
2022	Don't Forget the Lyrics! - Stai sul pezzo	Nove		Conductor	
2022	Eurovision Song Contest 2022 Turquoise Carpet	RaiPlay		Conductor	
2025	PrimaFestival	Rai 1		Co-host	

== Radio ==
Year	Title	Network	Notes
2002–present	Chiamate Roma Triuno Triuno	Radio Deejay	With Trio Medusa

== Works ==
- Trio Medusa (2005). Culattoni e raccomandati: la vera storia del Trio Medusa (in Italian). Piemme pocket. ISBN 88-384-8779-0.
- Corsi, Gabriele (2024). Che bella giornata, speriamo che non piova (in Italian). Cairo. ISBN 978-88-309-0427-9.

== Awards ==
Year	Award	Work	Result	Notes
2023	Telegatto	Don't Forget the Lyrics! - Stai sul pezzo	Won	
2024	Italian TV Award		Won	
2024	BCT Festival Benevento		Won	
2024	Margutta Award		Won	
