= Splende =

Studio album by Annalisa
- Released: 12 February 2015
- Recorded: 2014
- Genre: Pop; pop rock
- Length: 38:35
- Language: Italian
- Label: Warner
- Producer: Kekko Silvestre; Diego Calvetti; Enrico Palmosi

Annalisa chronology
Non so ballare (2013)	Splende (2015)	Se avessi un cuore (2016)

Singles from Splende
- 1. "Sento solo il presente" Released: 5 May 2014; 2. "L'ultimo addio" Released: 19 September 2015; 3. "Una finestra tra le stelle" Released: 11 February 2015; 4. "Vincerò" Released: 15 May 2015; 5. "Splende" Released: 18 September 2015

Splende is the fourth studio album by Italian singer Annalisa, released on February 12, 2015 by Warner Music Italy.

== Receptions ==
Professional ratings
Review scores
Source	Rating
Rockol	3.5/5 stars

Splende debuted at the 7th position of the FIMI Albums Chart, also remained top 10 in the next two weeks.

== Track listing ==
No.	Title	Lyrics	Music	Length
1.	"Vincerò"	Annalisa Scarrone; Cosimo Angiuli	Fabio Campedelli; Emiliano Cecere	3:21
2.	"Splende"	Scarrone; Francesco Sighieri; Diego Calvetti	Scarrone; Sighieri; Calvetti	3:24
3.	"Un bacio prima di morire"	Scarrone; Calvetti; Luca Angelosanti	Scarrone; Calvetti; Francesco Morettini; Lapo Consortini	3:50
4.	"L'ultimo addio"	Scarrone	Calvetti; Sighieri	3:36
5.	"Sento solo il presente"	Francesco Silvestre	Silvestre	3:43
6.	"Questo amore"	Davide Esposito	Esposito; Calvetti	3:21
7.	"Una finestra tra le stelle"	Silvestre	Silvestre	3:31
8.	"Niente tranne noi"	Scarrone; Campedelli	Campedelli; Cecere	3:33
9.	"Se potessi"	Scarrone; Giulia Anania	Campedelli; Cecere	3:38
10.	"Posizione fetale"	Scarrone	Scarrone; Dario Faini	3:31
11.	"Ti sento"	Aldo Stellita	Sergio Cossu; Carlo Marrale	3:07
Total length:				38:35

== Credits and personnel ==
- Annalisa - lead vocals, backing vocals
- Enrico Palmosi - piano, programming
- Claudio Dirani - drums
- Andrea Benassai - guitar, programming
- Diego Calvetti - piano, synthesizer, programming
- Giorgio Secco - acoustic guitar
- Rossano Eleuteri - bass guitar
- Diego Arrigoni - electric guitar
- Nicola Oliva - acoustic guitar
- Emiliano Bassi - drums
- Stefano Forcella - bass guitar
- Enrico Zapparoli - acoustic guitar
- Donald Renda - drums
- Paolo Petrini - electric guitar
- Concertmaster - Angela Savi, Angela Tomei, Maria Costanza Costantino
- Violin - Natalia Kuleshova, Roberta Malavolti, Teona Kazishvili
- Viola - Sabrina Giuliani, Valentina Rebaudengo
- Cello - Elisabetta Sciotti, Laura Gorkoff

== Charts ==
Chart (2015)	Peak position
Italian Albums (FIMI)	7

== Certifications ==
Certifications for Splende
Region	Certification	Certified units/sales
Italy (FIMI)	Gold	25,000^{‡}
^{‡} Sales+streaming figures based on certification alone.
