= Sono un grande =

2025 Tiziano Ferro album

Studio album by Tiziano Ferro
- Released: 24 October 2025
- Studio: Los Angeles
- Genres: Pop; R&B
- Length: 34:15
- Language: Italian
- Label: Sugar Music
- Producers: Tiziano Ferro; Marco Sonzini; Marz; Zef

Tiziano Ferro chronology
Il mondo è nostro (2023)	Sono un grande (2025)

Singles from Sono un grande
- 1. "Cuore rotto" Released: 5 September 2025; 2. "Fingo&spingo" Released: 23 October 2025; 3. "Sono un grande" Released: 2 January 2026

Sono un grande ("I Am Great") is the ninth studio album by Italian singer-songwriter Tiziano Ferro, released on 24 October 2025 by Sugar Music.

== Background and composition ==
After his eighth studio album Il mondo è nostro, Ferro had been going through a period marked by personal and professional ups and downs, including his divorce from his ex-husband Victor Allen and custody of his children. In August 2025, Ferro announced that he had signed with a new label, Sugar Music, and a new manager, Paola Zukar after the end of his contract with Universal Music Group. He said of the changes, "Working with a new team gave me the opportunity to look at what I do with new eyes, it was the opportunity to change some aspects of the work and fall in love with the music profession again."

The project consists of 11 tracks produced by Ferro himself with Marco Sonzini, Alessandro Pulga aka Marz, and Stefano Tognini aka Zef, Emilio Barberini aka Madfingerz, Bias, Alessandro De Crescenzo and Will Medini. Physical editions include a 12th track, Ferro's own recording of "Tra le mani un cuore", a song he wrote for Massimo Ranieri with Filippo Neviani aka Nek, Marta Venturini and Giulia Anania.

== Promotion and release ==
A summer 2026 Italian stadium tour, called the Stadi 26 Tour, was announced on 15 September 2025.

Ferro announced the album on 24 September 2025, which was released on 24 October 2025 by Sugar Music. He said of the album, "Because if I'm not dead yet ... Maybe it's by chance, maybe it's by mistake, or maybe it's because I'm great ... Sono un grande is the fruit of everything that has happened in my life, the awareness that, if I have managed to overcome all the storms, it is because perhaps I have done something good and I deserve a happy future."

== Singles ==
The album was preceded by the single "Cuore rotto" ("Broken heart"), released on 5 September 2025 It is Ferro's first single since he signed with Sugar Music earlier that year. A second single, "Fingo&spingo", was released on 23 October 2025. A third single, "Sono un grande", released on 2 January 2026.

== Track listing ==
Sono un grande – Standard edition
No.	Title	Lyrics	Music	Producer(s)	Length
1.	"Sono un grande"	Tiziano Ferro; Roberto Casalino; Simone Cremonini	Casalino; Cremonini	Zef; Marco Sonzini	3:21
2.	"Fingo&spingo"	Ferro	Ferro; Stefano Tognini	Zef	3:30
3.	"Cuore rotto"	Ferro	Ferro	Zef; Marz; Sonzini	2:28
4.	"Milite ignoto"	Ferro	Ferro	Bias	3:55
5.	"Ti sognai"	Ferro; Laura Bono	Ferro; Pilar Arejo; Bono	Zef	2:31
6.	"Gioia"	Ferro	Ferro	Zef; Madfingerz	2:41
7.	"Quello che si voleva"	Ferro; Chiara Galiazzo; Casalino	Ferro; Nicolas Biasin; Francesco Catitti; Galiazzo	Bias; Sonzini	3:25
8.	"L'amore è re"	Ferro	Ferro; Casalino	Zef; Alessandro De Crescenzo; Sonzini	3:01
9.	"1-2-3"	Ferro; Casalino	Ferro; Biasin; Sonzini; Casalino	Bias	3:23
10.	"Le piace"	Ferro	Ferro	Zef; Sonzini	2:23
11.	"Meritiamo di più"	Ferro; Casalino	Casalino; Niccolò Verrienti	Bias; Sonzini	3:37
Total length:					34:15

Sono un grande – Deluxe edition bonus tracks
No.	Title	Lyrics	Music	Producer(s)	Length
1.	"Superstar" (with Giorgia)	Ferro; Giorgia Todrani	Ferro; Todrani	Zef; Sonzini	2:56
2.	"Felici a metà" (with Shiva)	Ferro; Andrea Arrigoni	Ferro; Diego Vincenzo Vettraino	Drillionaire	3:19
3.	"Xxdono" (with Lazza)	Ferro; Jacopo Lazzarini	Ferro	Zef; Nko	3:04
4.	"Xxverso" (with Ditonellapiaga)	Ferro; Margherita Carducci	Ferro	Zef	3:00
5.	"Ti sognai" (remix; with Ariete)	Ferro; Bono; Arianna Del Ghiaccio	Ferro; Arejo; Bono	Zef	2:31
6.	"Unico"	Ferro	Ferro; Tognini	Zef	3:50
7.	"A Napoli"	Ferro	Ferro; Biasin	Bias; Zef	3:13
19.	"Tra le mani un cuore"	Ferro; Filippo Neviani; Marta Venturini; Giulia Anania	Ferro; Neviani; Venturini; Anania	Zef; Will Medini	3:15

== Charts ==
Chart performance for Sono un grande
Chart (2025)	Peak position
Italian Albums (FIMI)	1
Swiss Albums (Schweizer Hitparade)	30

== Certifications ==
Certifications for Sono un grande
Region	Certification	Certified units/sales
Italy (FIMI)	Gold	25,000^{‡}
^{‡} Sales+streaming figures based on certification alone.
