= Pelle diamante =

2025 single by Marcella Bella

Single by Marcella Bella

from the album Etnea
- Released: 12 February 2025
- Genre: Electropop
- Length: 2:39
- Label: BMG
- Songwriters: Marcella Bella; Senatore Cirenga; Alessandro Simoncini; Pasquale Mammaro; Marco Rettani
- Producer: Luca Chiaravalli

Marcella Bella singles chronology
"L'Etna" (2024)	"Pelle diamante" (2025)

"Pelle diamante" ("Diamond skin") is a single by the Italian singer Marcella Bella, released on 12 February 2025 as the fourth single from the eighteenth studio album Etnea. The song was presented in competition at the Sanremo Music Festival 2025 where it finished in 29th and last place at the end of the event.

== Sanremo Music Festival 2025 ==
Italian broadcaster RAI organised the 75th edition of the Sanremo Music Festival between 11 and 15 February 2025. On 1 December 2024, Bella was announced among the participants of the festival, with the title of her competing entry revealed the following 18 December. The song finished in 29th and last place.

== Charts ==
Chart performance for "Pelle diamante"
Chart (2025)	Peak position
Italy (FIMI)	36
Italy Airplay (EarOne)	66
