= Viva la Vida (disambiguation) =

"Viva la Vida" is a 2008 song by Coldplay.

Viva la Vida may also refer to:

== Films ==
- ¡Viva la vida!, a 1934 film directed by José María Castellví
- Viva la vie, a 1984 French film directed by Claude Lelouch
- Viva La Vida (2024 film), a Chinese film directed by Yan Han

== Music ==
=== Albums ===
- Viva la Vida or Death and All His Friends, 2008 Coldplay album
- Viva la Vida, 1991 album by Joan Sebastian
- Viva la Vida, 2012 album by Vikki Carr
- Vivalavida, 1999 album by Carnival in Coal

=== Songs ===
- "Viva la Vida", 1941 song from Billy the Kid (1941 film)
- "Viva la Vida", 1986 song by Michel Fugain
- "Viva la Vida", 2004 song by Roy Brown (Puerto Rican musician) on Balcon del Fin del Mundo
- "Viva la Vida", 2011 song by In Extremo from the album Sterneneisen
- "Viva la Vida", 2012 song by Vikki Carr
- "Viva la Vida", 2022 song by Hong Jin-young
- "¡Que Viva la Vida!", 2011 song by Wisin & Yandel

=== Tours ===
- Viva la Vida Tour by Coldplay

== Paintings ==
- Viva la Vida, Sandías (1954), a painting by Frida Kahlo

== See also ==
- "Viva la vita", 2025 song by Francesco Gabbani
- Viva Lavida, 2025 album by Joeboy
