= Angie (Italian singer) =

Italian singer-songwriter (born 2001)

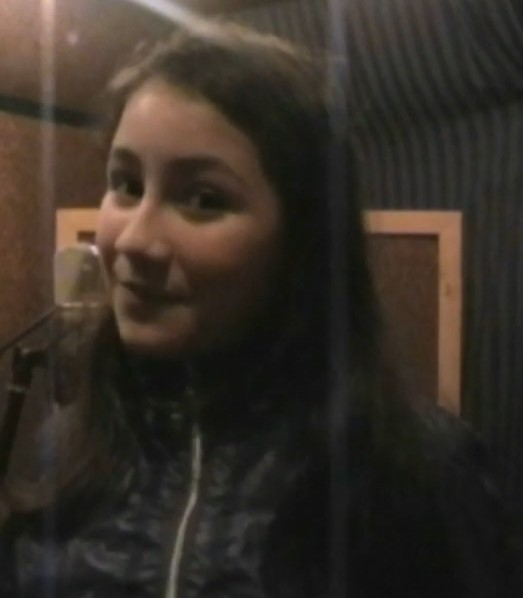
- Angie in June 2012

Background information
- Born: Angelica Paola Ibba; 14 April 2001 (age 25); Uta, Sardinia, Italy
- Genre: Pop
- Occupations: Singer; songwriter
- Instruments: Vocals; piano
- Years active: 2021–present
- Labels: ADA (2022–2024); EMI (2024–present)
- Partner: Saturno

Logo

Angelica Paola Ibba (born 14 April 2001), known professionally as Angie, is an Italian singer-songwriter.

== Early life and education ==
Born in 2001 in Uta (CA), Sardinia, she is the daughter of Paola and Giuseppe Ibba and has a brother, Alessio, who is an aeroplane pilot.

Dedicated to music since childhood, Angie revealed her focus was on international pop and cited several artists, including Ariana Grande, Madison Beer, Olivia Rodrigo, Sabrina Carpenter and Tate McRae. She also cited Italian artists, including Mahmood and Tiziano Ferro.

After high school, she decided to move to Milan to study modern singing at Loretta Martinez's VMS Italia academy. Once she earned her degree, she began to pursue a career as a singer-songwriter, sharing her music on social media.

== Career ==
Having been interested in music since childhood, at the age of nine she joined the cast of the fourth season of the Rai 1 music talent show Ti lascio una canzone, hosted by Antonella Clerici. In 2018, at the age of sixteen, she participated in the fifth season of the Rai 2 talent show The Voice of Italy, again hosted by Antonella Clerici, where she was part of J-Ax's team and was eliminated during the sixth episode.

In 2021 – under the pseudonym "Angie World" – she participated in the second edition of the Boh Talent contest, in which she won the final against Sara De Villa. On 12 February 2022, she released her first official single, "Scema", followed on 27 May by the single "Fake", both of which preceded her debut EP, Per te, released on 18 November. On 1 July she released the single "Melanina" together with the Cedraux. On 14 July 2023 she released the single "Giuda", followed on 27 October by the single "Caramelle" together with Blame.

On 30 January 2024, she released the single "Frasi mai dette", followed on 12 April by the single "Serata iconica?" by Piazzabologna, on which she collaborated. She subsequently signed a new recording contract with EMI, the label of Universal Music Italia, with which she released the single "Vent'anni" on 3 May.

In October 2024 she was selected to participate in Sanremo Giovani 2024, the youth competition for the Sanremo Music Festival 2025, with the song "Scorpione", with which she was eliminated in the first round.

On 10 January 2025 the single "Amarti a 100 all'ora" by CanovA, on which she collaborated, was released. On 11 April she released the single "Se ci lasciassimo domani", followed on 27 June by the single "Dolcedolcemente".

In October 2025, after overcoming a challenge, she entered the twenty-five season of the Canale 5 music talent show Amici di Maria De Filippi, advancing to the initial round. In February 2026 she gained access to the evening phase of the program by joining the team led by Lorella Cuccarini, being eliminated during the final on 18 May, during which she won the Radio Award.

During the program, she released several new songs, including "Poco poco", "Millemila missili", "Lettere al paradiso" and "Signorina", all four of which were later included in her debut studio album, Sogni di vetro, released on 22 May 2026 by EMI, which also includes the songs "Controcorrente", "Meglio di me", "Smielate canzoni d'amore" and "Sogni di vetro". On 18 September the single "Notte malinconia" was released. On 6 and 9 October his first concerts took place in the clubs of Rome and Milan.

== Personal life ==
She is romantically linked to the singer-songwriter Mattia Poggetti, aka Saturno.

== Discography ==
=== Studio albums ===
List of albums
Title	Album details	Peak chart positions
Title	Album details	ITA
Sogni di vetro	Released: 22 May 2026; Label: EMI; Format: CD, digital download, streaming	44

=== Extended plays ===
List of EPs
Title	EP details
Per te	Released: 18 November 2022; Label: ADA; Format: CD, digital download, streaming

=== Singles ===
==== As lead artist ====
List of singles and album name
Title	Year	Album or EP
"Scema"	2022	Per te
"Fake"	2022	Per te
"Melanina" (with Cedraux)	2022	Non-album singles
"Giuda"	2023	Non-album singles
"Caramelle" (with Blame)	2023	Digital era
"Frasi mai dette"	2024	Non-album singles
"Vent'anni"	2024	Non-album singles
"Scorpione"	2024	Non-album singles
"Se ci lasciassimo domani"	2025	Non-album singles
"Dolcedolcemente"	2025	Non-album singles
"Poco poco"	2025	Sogni di vetro
"Millemila missili"	2026	Sogni di vetro
"Lettere al paradiso"	2026	Sogni di vetro
"Signorina"	2026	Sogni di vetro
"Notte malinconia"	2026	Non-album single

==== As featured artist ====
List of singles and album name
Title	Year	Album
"Serata iconica?" (Piazzabologna featuring Angie)	2024	Municipio :)
"Amarti a 100 all'ora" (CanovA featuring Angie)	2025	CanovA Game Room Season 2

== Songwriting credits ==
List of selected songs co-written by Angie
Title	Year	Artist(s)	Album or EP
"Cani randagi"	2024	Blame	Digital era
"Colpa nostra"	2025	Mameli	Estate blu

== Television programs ==
Year	Title	Network	Role(s)	Notes
2010	Ti lascio una canzone	Rai 1	Herself / Contestant	Talent show (season 4)
2018	The Voice of Italy	Rai 2	Herself / Contestant	Talent show (season 5)
2025–2026	Amici di Maria De Filippi	Canale 5	Herself / Contestant	Talent show (season 25)

== Participation in singing events ==
- Sanremo Giovani (Rai 2)
  - 2024 – Not a finalist with "Scorpione"

== Awards and nominations ==
Year	Award	Nomination	Work	Result	Notes
2021	Boh Talent (season 2)		Herself	Won	
2026	Amici di Maria De Filippi	Radio Award (season 25)	Herself	Won	
