= Il ritmo delle cose =

2025 single by Rkomi

Single by Rkomi

from the album Decrescendo
- Language: Italian
- Released: 12 February 2025
- Genre: Electropop
- Length: 3:12
- Label: Island; Universal Music Italia
- Songwriters: Mirko Martorana; Jacopo Ettorre; Francesco Catitti; Luca Faraone; Matteo Pierotti; Pablo Miguel Lombroni Capalbo
- Producers: Katoo; Shablo; Luca Faraone

Rkomi singles chronology
| "Odio, quindi sono" (2024) | "Il ritmo delle cose" (2025) | "Apnea da un po'" (2025) |

Music video
- "il ritmo delle cose." music video on YouTube

"Il ritmo delle cose" (stylized as "il ritmo delle cose."; Italian for "The course of things") is a song co-written and recorded by Italian singer-songwriter and rapper Rkomi. It was released on 12 February 2025 through Island and Universal Music Italia as the lead single from his fourth studio album Decrescendo.

The song was presented and competed during the 75th edition of Sanremo Music Festival, held from 11 to 15 February 2025, where it eventually placed 28th among the final ranking.

== Music and lyrics ==
"Il ritmo delle cose" was written by Rkomi alongside Jacopo Ettorre, Francesco "Katoo" Catitti, Luca Faraone, Matteo Pierotti, and Pablo Miguel Lombroni Capalbo. Catitti and Faraone, together with Italian DJ and record producer Shablo, also produced the song. Its lyrics delve into the chaos of human relationships during the digital age, touching on themes such as social alienation and dissatisfaction. Rkomi describes the song as an attempt to embrace disorder and make sense of one's time. The structure of the lyrics follows a stream of consciousness approach, aiming to make the listener reflect on the loneliness caused by digital isolation. During a press conference, about the song Rkomi stated:

"["Il ritmo delle cose"] comes from a deep need to accept and embrace chaos—making it my own in some way and giving meaning to time, to my time. If it were an image, it would look like a Rorschach inkblot."

== Promotion and release ==
On 1 December 2024, Carlo Conti, the main presenter of the Sanremo 2025 Music Festival, announced live on TG1 that Rkomi would participate in the Festival. The song's title was announced more than two weeks later, on December 18, during the grand finale of Sanremo Giovani, a separated musical competition related to Sanremo Festival but specifically dedicated to newcomers in order to give them an opportunity in Italian music industry and to get better exposure. The song was released on all music platforms, including Spotify, at 1:30 AM on 12 February 2025, after the conclusion of the first night of the Sanremo Music Festival, where Rkomi presented and performed the song live for the first time ever. The song was subsequently sent to Italian radio on the same day.

== Critical reception ==
"Il ritmo delle cose" ratings
Review scores
| Source | Rating |
|---|---|
| SKY TG24 | 6-/10 |
| Il Giornale | 6-/10 |
| Il Mattino | 4.5/10 |
| Corriere della Sera | 6/10 |
| AllMusic Italia | 4.5/10 |

"Il ritmo delle cose" received generally positive reviews from music critics.

Andrea Laffranchi from Corriere della Sera, reviewing "Il ritmo delle cose" with a score of 6/10, described the song as "suited for the singer's dark side", defined by Laffranchi as "Darkomi", especially underlying the ability of the song "to force [the listener] to face emptiness, disappointments, and disillusionment". Gianni Sibilla from Rockol noted that the song helped to "reconnect [Rkomi] with his roots, but with more pop than rock vibes".

In a positive review of the song, Rolling Stone's journalist Filippo Ferrari wrote that "the lyrics hit hard, but so does the melody", firmly believing that "it really works, but just give it time to grow on you".

Alvise Salerno from AllMusic Italia described the song as being able to "evoke Rkomi's new musical choices, more rap-oriented and farther from his previous style", adding that "the track won't last long beyond the Festival—but let's wait and see". Roberta Marchetti from Today stated that, while the song "has got a strong sound", the rest of the song is "nothing fresh, nothing groundbreaking. Tailor-made for radio". Music critics from Esquire Italia appreciated the track but questioned whether "it was suited for the Festival".

== Music video ==
An accompanying music video for "Il ritmo delle cose" was released on 12 February 2025, on Rkomi's YouTube official channel. The music video, directed by Giulio Squillacciotti, is set in a service wash in Milan run by an old lady, and shows her meeting several customers dropping off and picking up the clothes from the store. In some scenes, the lady is seen dancing in the store's laboratory.

== Charts ==
=== Weekly charts ===
Chart performance for "Il ritmo delle cose"
| Chart (2025) | Peak position |
|---|---|
| Italy (FIMI) | 10 |
| Italy Airplay (EarOne) | 36 |

=== Year-end charts ===
Year-end chart performance for "Il ritmo delle cose"
| Chart (2025) | Position |
|---|---|
| Italy (FIMI) | 51 |

== Certifications ==
Certifications for "Il ritmo delle cose"
| Region | Certification | Certified units/sales |
|---|---|---|
| Italy (FIMI) | Gold | 100,000^{‡} |
^{‡} Sales+streaming figures based on certification alone.
