= Battito =

Single by Fedez
- Language: Italian
- Released: 12 February 2025
- Genre: Pop rap
- Length: 3:14
- Label: Warner
- Songwriters: Federico Lucia; Alessandro La Cava; Federica Abbate; Nicola Lazzarin
- Producer: Cripo

Fedez singles chronology
"Allucinazione collettiva" (2024)	"Battito" (2025)	"Bella stronza" (2025)

Music video
- "Battito" on YouTube

"Battito" (Italian pronunciation: [ˈbattito]; transl. "Heartbeat" or "Pulse") is a song co-written and recorded by Italian rapper Fedez, released by Warner on 12 February 2025. The song competed in the Sanremo Music Festival 2025, finishing in fourth position at the final rank.

== Music video ==
The music video of "Battito", directed by Byron Rosero, was released on 12 February 2025 via Fedez's YouTube channel. It stars the actress Irene Guissani, impersonating the artist's depression.

== Charts ==
=== Weekly charts ===
Weekly chart performance for "Battito"
Chart (2025)	Peak position
Global 200 (Billboard)	156
Italy (FIMI)	2
Italy Airplay (EarOne)	16
Switzerland (Schweizer Hitparade)	15

=== Year-end charts ===
Year-end chart performance for "Battito"
Chart (2025)	Position
Italy (FIMI)	13

== Certifications ==
Certifications for "Battito"
Region	Certification	Certified units/sales
Italy (FIMI)	Platinum	200,000^{‡}
^{‡} Sales+streaming figures based on certification alone.
