= Mille vote ancora =

Single by Rocco Hunt

from the album Ragazzo di giù
- Language: Italian; Neapolitan
- Released: 12 February 2025
- Genre: Hip hop; urban
- Length: 3:12
- Label: Epic; Sony
- Composers: Kende; Marco Salvaderi; Davide Simonetta; Paolo Antonacci; Lorenzo Santarelli; Zef
- Lyricist: Rocco Hunt
- Producers: Zef; Room9

Rocco Hunt singles chronology
"Push!" (2024)	"Mille vote ancora" (2025)	"Cosa ti amo a fare?" (2025)

Music video
- "Mille vote ancora" on YouTube

"Mille vote ancora" (Neapolitan pronunciation: [ˈmillə ˈvɔːt(ə) aŋˈɡɔːrə]; transl. "A thousand more times") is a song by Italian singer Rocco Hunt, released on 12 February 2025 through Epic Records and Sony Music, reaching a peak position of 24 in the Italian charts. The song formed Rocco Hunt's entry into the Sanremo Music Festival 2025.

== Release ==
On 1 December 2024, Carlo Conti announced on TG1 the artists who would be participating in Sanremo Music Festival 2025, including Rocco Hunt. The song's title was announced on 18 December, and it eventually finished in 15th position at the competition in February 2025.

The song marked Hunt's third participation in the contest after his victory in the Sanremo Music Festival 2014 Newcomers' section and his ninth place in the Sanremo Music Festival 2016 Big Artists section.

== Lyrics ==
The lyrics to several verses of the song are written in the Neapolitan dialect.

The song talks about having a difficult relationship with one's place of birth, with Hunt looking at Salerno with a mixture of nostalgia and a desire to leave due to difficult social conditions in certain areas of the city.

The song was written by Rocco Hunt, and produced by Room9, and Stefano Tognini (known professionally as Zef). The music was written by Davide Simonetta, Gabriel Rossi, Lorenzo Santarelli, Marco Salvaderi, Paolo Antonacci and Stefano Tognini.

== Video ==
The music video for the song was directed by Fabrizio Conte, and filmed between both Milan and Salerno. The video was published alongside the song's release on Rocco Hunt's YouTube channel.

== Charts ==
Chart performance for "Mille vote ancora"
Chart (2025)	Peak position
Italy (FIMI)	24
Italy Airplay (EarOne)	29
