= Quando sarai piccola =

2025 single by Simone Cristicchi

Single by Simone Cristicchi

from the album Dalle tenebre alla luce
- Released: 12 February 2025
- Genre: Traditional pop
- Length: 3:06
- Label: Dueffel, ADA Italy
- Songwriters: Amara; Nicola Brunialti; Simone Cristicchi
- Producer: Francesco Musacco

Simone Cristicchi singles chronology
"Centro di gravità permanente" (2022)	"Quando sarai piccola" (2025)

"Quando sarai piccola" ("When You [f.] Are Little") is a single by the Italian singer-songwriter Simone Cristicchi, released on 12 February 2025 as the first single from the reissue of the fifth studio album Dalle tenebre alla luce. The song was presented in competition at the Sanremo Music Festival 2025 where it finished in fifth place at the end of the event.

== Background ==
The song, written by Cristicchi himself together with his partner Amara and Nicola Brunialti, presents itself as a reflection on the mother-child relationship and deals with the reversal of roles between parent and child, with the son taking care of the mother, who, due to illness and old age, becomes "little" again.

== Sanremo Music Festival 2025 ==
Italian broadcaster RAI organised the 75th edition of the Sanremo Music Festival between 11 and 15 February 2025. On 1 December 2024, Cristicchi was announced among the participants of the festival, with the title of his competing entry revealed the following 18 December. The song finished in fifth place.

== Charts ==
Chart performance for "Quando sarai piccola"
Chart (2025)	Peak position
Italy (FIMI)	16
Italy Airplay (EarOne)	41
