= Alex Wyse (singer) =

Italian singer-songwriter (born 2000)

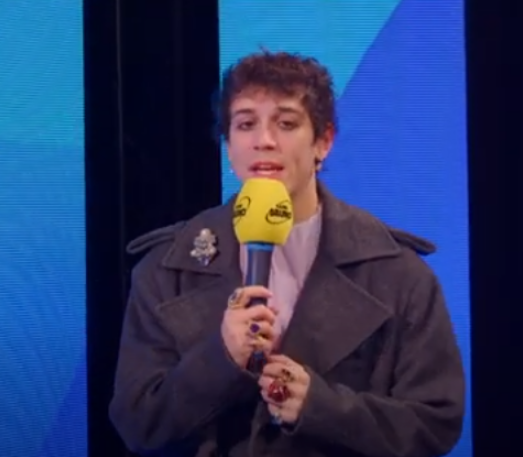
- Wyse in 2025

Background information
- Also known as: Alex W
- Born: Alessandro Rina; 16 June 2000 (age 26)
- Genre: Pop
- Occupations: Singer; songwriter
- Years active: 2021–present

Alessandro Rina (born 16 June 2000), known professionally as Alex Wyse, is an Italian singer-songwriter.

== Career ==
His music career began after studying at the British and Irish Modern Music Institute in London, where he graduated in 2019. In 2021, he participated in the talent show Amici di Maria De Filippi, reaching the final in May 2022 and finishing in fourth place. During the show, he released his debut EP, Non siamo soli, which topped the FIMI Albums Chart and was certified gold.

On 4 November 2022, he launched his debut studio album, Ciò che abbiamo dentro, which was also certified gold. Several singles were released from the album, including "Mano ferma" and "Dire, fare, curare", in collaboration with Sophie and the Giants.

In 2024, he participated in Sanremo Giovani with the song "Rockstar", qualifying for the Newcomers' section of the Sanremo Music Festival 2025, where he finished in second place in the final.

== Discography ==
=== Studio albums ===
Title	Album details	Peak chart positions	Certifications
Title	Album details	ITA	Certifications
Ciò che abbiamo dentro	Release date: 4 November 2022; Label: 21co, Artist First	5	FIMI: Gold

=== EPs ===
Title	EP details	Peak chart positions	Certifications
Title	EP details	ITA	Certifications
Non siamo soli	Release date: 10 June 2022; Label: 21co, Artist First	1	FIMI: Gold

=== Singles ===
Title	Year	Peak chart positions	Certifications	Album/EP
Title	Year	ITA	Certifications	Album/EP
"Sogni al cielo"	2021	67	FIMI: Gold	Non siamo soli
"Accade"	2022	—		Non siamo soli
"Senza chiedere permesso"	2022	88		Non siamo soli
"Non siamo soli"	2022	—		Non siamo soli
"Mano ferma"	2022	—		Ciò che abbiamo dentro
"Dire, fare, curare" (featuring Sophie and the Giants)	2023	—		Ciò che abbiamo dentro
"Un po' di te"	2023	—		Non-album singles
"La mia canzone per te"	2023	—		Non-album singles
"Gocce di limone"	2024	—		Non-album singles
"Amando si impara"	2024	—		Non-album singles
"Rockstar"	2024	49		Non-album singles
"Batticuore"	2025	—		Non-album singles

== Television ==
Year	Broadcaster	Title	Role	Notes
2021–2022	Canale 5	Amici di Maria De Filippi	Contestant	Talent show (season 21)
2024	Rai 1	Sanremo Giovani	Contestant	Selection for annual music festival; selected
2025	Rai 1	Sanremo Music Festival	Contestant (Newcomers' section)	Annual music festival; 2nd place
