= Non ti dimentico =

Single by Modà

from the album 8 canzoni
- Language: Italian
- Released: 12 February 2025
- Genre: Pop rock
- Length: 3:25
- Label: Warner
- Songwriter: Francesco Silvestre
- Producer: Enrico "Kikko" Palmosi

Modà singles chronology
"Il foglietto col tuo nome" (2024)	"Non ti dimentico" (2025)	"Come hai sempre fatto" (2025)

Music video
- "Non ti dimentico" on YouTube

"Non ti dimentico" ("I won't forget you") is a 2025 song by Italian group Modà. It was released by Warner on 12 February 2025. The song competed in the Sanremo Music Festival 2025, placing 22nd.

== Music video ==
A music video of "Non ti dimentico", directed by Roberto Chierici, was released on 12 February 2025 via Modà's YouTube channel.

== Charts ==
Chart performance for "Non ti dimentico"
Chart (2025)	Peak position
Italy (FIMI)	29
Italy Airplay (EarOne)	49

== Certifications ==
Certifications for "Non ti dimentico"
Region	Certification	Certified units/sales
Italy (FIMI)	Gold	100,000^{‡}
^{‡} Sales+streaming figures based on certification alone.
