= Maria Tomba =

Italian singer-songwriter (born 2002)

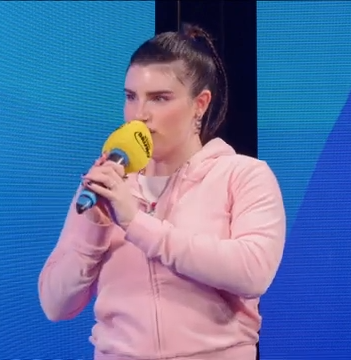
- Maria Tomba in 2025

Background information
- Born: 3 October 2002 (age 23); Verona, Veneto, Italy
- Genres: Pop
- Occupations: Singer; songwriter
- Years active: 2023–present

Maria Tomba (born 3 October 2002) is an Italian singer and songwriter.

== Life and career ==
Born in 2002 in Verona, Tomba raised in Lobia. Her father Massimo died when she was sixteen. During high school, she gained musical experience with the group Sun School Band and began writing songs at the age of fourteen, competing at local festivals.

In 2023, she participated in X Factor, finishing among the four finalists and presenting the song "Crush", which anticipated her first EP with the same name.

In 2024, Tomba released the single "Malefica" and took part in the Area Sanremo competition with "Goodbye (voglio good vibes)", qualifying for Sanremo Giovani and earning the opportunity to participate in the Sanremo Music Festival 2025, where she was eliminated in the semifinals. On 14 February 2025, she released her first album, Requiem (per un sogno).

== Discography ==
=== Studio albums ===
Title	Album details
Requiem (per un sogno)	Release date: 14 February 2025; Label: Isola degli Artisti

=== EPs ===
Title	EP details
Crush	Release date: 10 May 2020; Label: Warner Music

=== Singles ===
Title	Year	Peak chart positions	Album/EP
Title	Year	ITA	Album/EP
"Crush"	2023	—	Crush
"Malefica"	2024	—	Requiem (per un sogno)
"Goodbye (voglio good vibes)"	2024	57	Requiem (per un sogno)

== Television ==
Year	Broadcaster	Title	Role	Notes
2023	Sky Uno	X Factor	Contestant	Talent show (season 17)
2024	Rai 1	Area Sanremo	Contestant	Selection for annual music festival; selected
2024	Rai 1	Sanremo Giovani	Contestant	Selection for annual music festival; selected
2025	Rai 1	Sanremo Music Festival	Contestant (Newcomers' section)	Annual music festival
