= Sento solo il presente =

Single by Annalisa

from the album Splende
- Released: 5 May 2014
- Genre: Pop
- Length: 3:43
- Label: Warner Music Italy
- Songwriter: Francesco Silvestre
- Producers: Kekko Silvestre; Enrico Palmosi

Annalisa singles chronology
"Tutto sommato" (2014)	"Sento solo il presente" (2014)	"L'ultimo addio" (2014)

Music video
- "Sento solo il presente" on YouTube

"Sento solo il presente" (lit. 'I just feel the present') is a song recorded by Italian singer Annalisa, released by Warner Music Italy on 5 May 2014 as the lead single from her fourth studio album Splende.. It was written by Italian band Modà's frontman Francesco Silvestre and produced by Silvestre and Enrico Palmosi.

The song peaked at number 7 on the FIMI Singles Chart and was certified gold in Italy.

== Music video ==
A music video to accompany the release of "Sento solo il presente" was released onto YouTube on 16 May 2014. It was directed by Gaetano Morbioli and shot in the Sigurtà Garden Park in Valeggio sul Mincio, Veneto.

== Track listing ==
Digital download
No.	Title	Length
1.	"Sento solo il presente"	3:43

== Charts ==
Chart performance for "Sento solo il presente"
Chart (2014)	Peak position
Italy (FIMI)	7

== Certifications ==
Region	Certification	Certified units/sales
Italy (FIMI)	Gold	15,000^{‡}
^{‡} Sales+streaming figures based on certification alone.
