= Bella stronza =

1994 single by Marco Masini

Single by Marco Masini

from the album Il cielo della vergine
- Released: December 1994
- Length: 4:14
- Label: Dischi Ricordi
- Songwriters: Giancarlo Bigazzi; Marco Masini

Marco Masini singles chronology
"La libertà" (1993)	"Bella stronza" (1994)	"Principessa" (1995)

Audio
- "Bella stronza" on YouTube

"Bella stronza" (transl. "Beautiful bitch") is a 1994 Italian song by Marco Masini, composed by Masini and Giancarlo Bigazzi. It is the leading single of Masini's 1995 album Il cielo della vergine.

== Overview ==
The song tells the story of a painful breakup, with a desperate man lashing out at the woman for being an opportunist and for having ruined their relationship. At the time of its release, Masini described it as "partly autobiographical and partly based on stories that happened to friends", and the song attracted gossip, with articles even managing to identify the woman of the song and the circumstances of her breakup with Masini.

== Reception ==
Upon its debut, much of the critical attention for the song centered on Masini's frequent use of profanities, reminiscent of his 1993 hit "Vaffanculo" ('Fuck you'), with critics divided between seeing it as a deliberate provocation and as an honest portrayal of the youth of the time. In more recent years, most of the attention regarded the lyrics, criticized for being sexist and for seemingly even condoning sexual assault. In 2020, the same Masini distanced himself from the song, referring to it as "a product of its time" and admitting that he would not write it the same way today.

== Track listing ==
No.	Title	Writer(s)	Length
1.	"Bella stronza (Radio Edit)"	Masini, Bigazzi	4:14
2.	"Bella stronza"	Masini, Bigazzi	5:21
3.	"Zero"	Masini, Bigazzi	4:53

== Certifications ==
Region	Certification	Certified units/sales
Italy (FIMI) Sales from 2009	Gold	25,000^{‡}
^{‡} Sales+streaming figures based on certification alone.

== Fedez feat. Marco Masini version ==
"Bella stronza"

Song by Fedez, Marco Masini
- Released: 2025
- Length: 2:56
- Label: Warner Music Italy
- Songwriters: Giancarlo Bigazzi, Marco Masini, Fedez
- Producer: FT Kings

Fedez chronology
"Battito" (2025)	"Bella stronza" (2025)	"Scelte stupide" (2025)

Music video
- "Bella stronza" on YouTube

For the fourth night of the Sanremo Music Festival 2025, during which competing artists were asked to perform an Italian or international classic, Fedez chose to present a revised version of Masini's song in a duet with its original singer.

Some news sources interpreted the choice of the song as Fedez expressing anger toward his ex-wife Chiara Ferragni or longtime lover Angelica Montini, with others suggested the 'beautiful bitch' being a personification of the depression, which was also the main theme of his Sanremo entry "Battito". Their performance ultimately finished in third place, behind Giorgia and Annalisa's version of "Skyfall" and Lucio Corsi and Topo Gigio's rendition of "Nel blu, dipinto di blu".

=== Charts ===
Chart (2025)	Peak position
Italy (FIMI)	24

=== Certifications ===
Region	Certification	Certified units/sales
Italy (FIMI)	Gold	100,000^{‡}
^{‡} Sales+streaming figures based on certification alone.
