= Lil Jolie =

Italian singer-songwriter (born 2000)

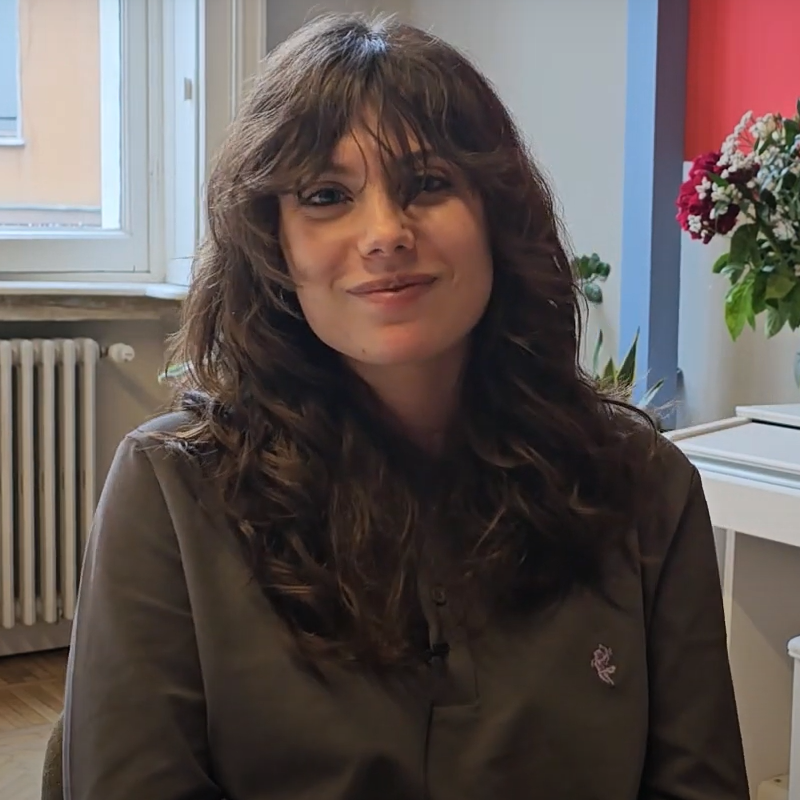
- Lil Jolie in 2024

Background information
- Born: Angela Ciancio; 29 March 2000 (age 26); Calvi Risorta, Campania, Italy
- Genres: Alt-pop; pop rap; indie rock; R&B
- Occupations: Singer; songwriter
- Instruments: Vocals; guitar
- Years active: 2018–present
- Labels: Sugar Music; Warner Music Italy; BMG Rights Management

Angela Ciancio (born 29 March 2000), known professionally as Lil Jolie, is an Italian singer and songwriter.

== Life and career ==
Ciancio began playing the guitar at the age of five thanks to her grandfather Luigi. She made her debut in 2018 on SoundCloud under the stage name "Lil Jolie". In 2019, she released her first single "Farsi male" and collaborated with various labels, including Sugar Music and Warner Music Italy, releasing several singles between 2020 and 2022. In May 2022, she released her debut EP, Bambina.

In September 2023, she participated in the talent show Amici di Maria De Filippi, being eliminated in April 2024. She subsequently signed with BMG Rights Management and released her second EP La vita non uccide.

She also participated in Sanremo Giovani 2024 alongside Vale LP with the song "Dimmi tu quando sei pronto per fare l'amore", qualifying for the "Newcomers" section of the Sanremo Music Festival 2025, which was eventually won by Settembre.

== Discography ==
=== Studio albums ===
Title	Album details
Le ragazze della valle (with Vale LP)	Release date: 23 May 2025; Label: Sugar Music

=== EPs ===
Title	Album details	Peak chart positions
Title	Album details	ITA
Bambina	Release date: 27 May 2022; Label: Warner Music	—
La vita non uccide	Release date: 17 May 2024; Label: BMG Rights Management	—

=== Singles ===
Title	Year	Peak chart positions	Album/EP
Title	Year	ITA	Album/EP
"Farsi male"	2019	—	Non-album single
"Diamanti"	2020	—	Non-album single
"Panico" (featuring Ketama126)	2020	—	Bambina
"Empty" (with Nahaze)	2021	—	Non-album single
"Regole" (featuring Carl Brave)	2021	—	Bambina
"Sola"	2022	—	Bambina
"Follia"	2023	—	La vita non uccide
"Non è la fine"	2023	—	La vita non uccide
"Attimo"	2024	—	La vita non uccide
"Kiss Me"	2024	—	La vita non uccide
"Dimmi tu quando sei pronto per fare l'amore" (with Vale LP)	2024	55	Le ragazze della valle
"Le ragazze della valle" (with Vale LP)	2025	—	Le ragazze della valle
"Dalle 9 alle 9" (with Vale LP featuring Irbis)	2025	—	Le ragazze della valle
"Googleamore" (with Vale LP)	2025	—	Le ragazze della valle
"Sophie"	2026	—	Non-album single
"—" denotes singles that did not chart or were not released.

== Television ==
Year	Broadcaster	Title	Role	Notes
2023–2024	Canale 5	Amici di Maria De Filippi	Contestant	Talent show (season 23)
2024	Rai 1	Sanremo Giovani	Contestant	Selection for annual music festival; selected
2025	Rai 1	Sanremo Music Festival	Contestant (Newcomers' section)	Annual music festival
