= Sanremo Music Festival 2025 =

Italian song contest (75th edition)

- Tutti cantano Sanremo

Dates and venue
- Semi-final 1: 11 February 2025
- Semi-final 2: 12 February 2025
- Semi-final 3: 13 February 2025
- Semi-final 4: 14 February 2025
- Final: 15 February 2025
- Venue: Teatro Ariston; Sanremo, Italy

Production
- Broadcaster: Radiotelevisione italiana (RAI)
- Director: Maurizio Pagnussat
- Musical director: Pinuccio Pirazzoli
- Artistic director: Carlo Conti
- Presenters: Carlo Conti with Antonella Clerici and Gerry Scotti (first night) Bianca Balti, Cristiano Malgioglio and Nino Frassica (second night) Miriam Leone, Elettra Lamborghini and Katia Follesa (third night) Mahmood and Geppi Cucciari (fourth night) Alessia Marcuzzi and Alessandro Cattelan (fifth night)

Big Artists section
- Number of entries: 29
- Voting system: Televote, press jury and radio jury
- Winner: "Balorda nostalgia" Olly

Newcomers' section
- Number of entries: 4
- Voting system: Televote, press jury and radio jury
- Winner: "Vertebre"; Settembre

The Sanremo Music Festival 2025 (Italian: Festival di Sanremo 2025), officially the 75th Italian Song Festival (75º Festival della canzone italiana), was the 75th edition of the annual Sanremo Music Festival, a television song contest held at the Teatro Ariston in Sanremo, organised and broadcast by Radiotelevisione italiana (RAI). It was held between 11 and 15 February 2025 and presented by Carlo Conti, who also served as the artistic director for the competition. The festival was won by Olly with "Balorda nostalgia", earning him the right of first refusal to represent Italy in the Eurovision Song Contest 2025; however, he ultimately declined the opportunity in favour of runner-up Lucio Corsi with "Volevo essere un duro".

== Format ==
RAI initially announced that the contest would be held from 4 to 8 February 2025. The dates were later changed to 11–15 February as they overlapped with the quarter-finals of Coppa Italia, broadcast on Mediaset channels.

=== Presenters ===
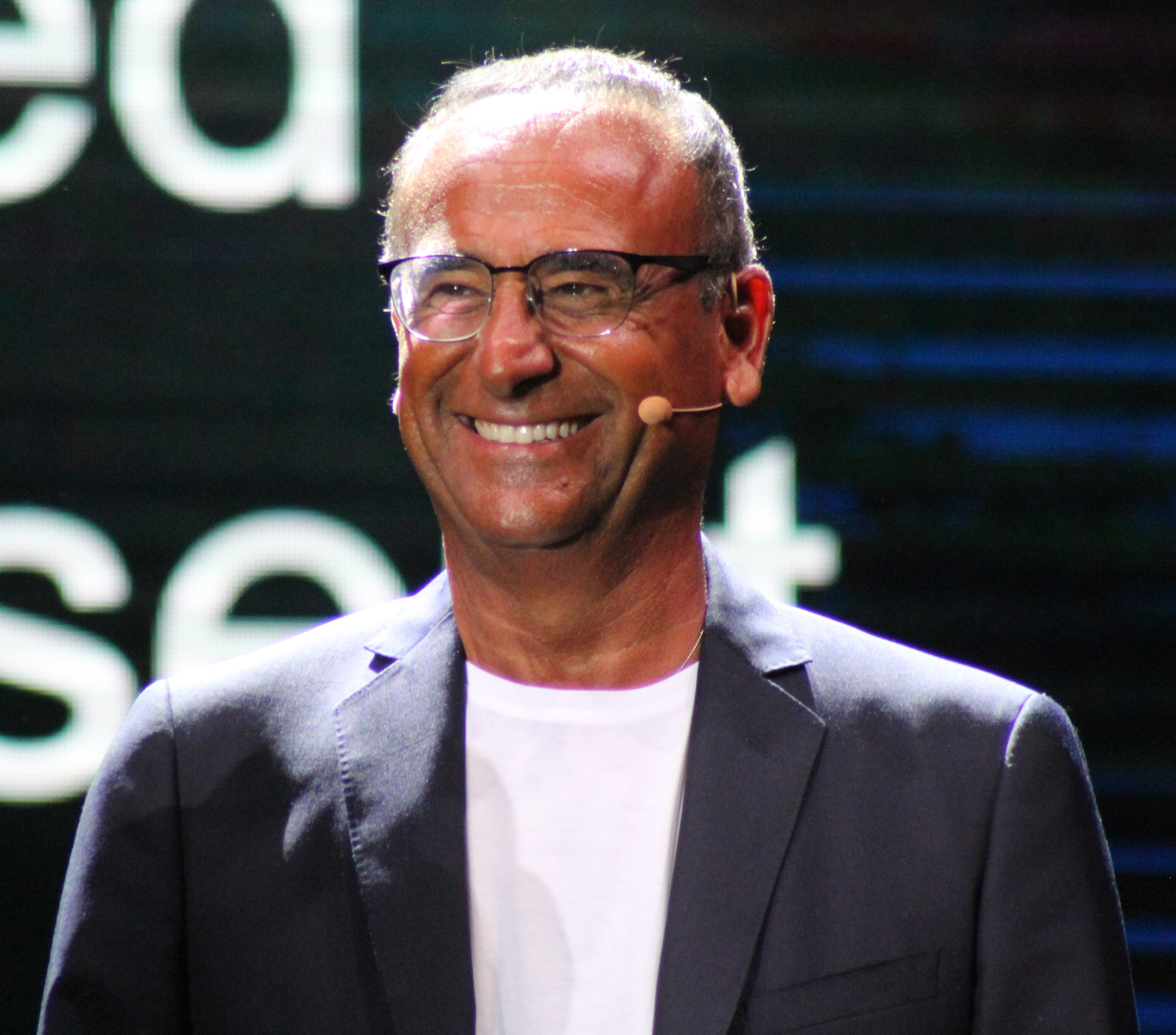
Carlo Conti, main presenter and artistic director of the 2025 contest

In June 2023, Amadeus, Sanremo's host and artistic director from 2020, announced that he would step down from his position after 2024. Despite proposals by RAI to remain for 2025, Amadeus confirmed during a press conference on 5 February 2024 that the 2024 edition would be his final time in the role.

On 22 May 2024, RAI announced Carlo Conti – who had previously taken on the role in 2015, 2016 and 2017 – as the artistic director and main host of the 2025 and 2026 editions. In October 2024, Conti announced that the special DopoFestival broadcast after each of the shows would be hosted by Alessandro Cattelan. The following month, Cattelan was announced as one of the co-hosts of the final night of the festival. In mid-January 2025, the complete line-up of the hosts was announced, which includes: Antonella Clerici (2005 co-host and 2010 host) and Gerry Scotti on the first night; Bianca Balti, Cristiano Malgioglio and Nino Frassica on the second night; Miriam Leone, Elettra Lamborghini and Katia Follesa on the third night; Mahmood (2019 and 2022 winner) and Geppi Cucciari on the fourth night; Alessia Marcuzzi in addition to Cattelan on the final. In late December 2024, the hosts of PrimaFestival, the introductory segment aired before each of the nights and during the opening red carpet, were announced to be Bianca Guaccero, Gabriele Corsi and Mariasole Pollio; comedy duo I Sansoni was added to the cast on 3 February 2025.

=== Stage design ===
In June 2024, it was announced that the Sanremo 2025 stage would be designed by Riccardo Bocchini, the same designer of the 2015, 2016 and 2017 editions.

=== Theme music ===
The official musical theme of the festival, "Tutta l'Italia", was composed by Gabry Ponte and was released on 31 January 2025.

=== Format changes ===
On 13 June 2024, Conti announced the first changes in the rules and the organisation of the contest: these include the reintroduction of the separate Newcomers' section, which was last featured in 2021, and that of DopoFestival, which would be reduced in length compared to previous editions; the "cover night" was retained, and once again none of the entries was eliminated before the final.

The complete rules were published on 20 August. It was initially confirmed that the number of entries would decrease from 30 to 24. As for the voting system, the results of the "cover night" would not be added to the score obtained on the other shows. On the final night, after the top five songs have been announced, there would be another round of voting, but unlike previous years, the results would then be added to the overall score. The song with the highest overall score would win the contest. In November, Conti announced that the number of entries would instead be higher than 24, as well as clarifying that competing artists would be able to duet with each other during the "cover night"; the entries were ultimately revealed to be 30 as in the previous edition.

=== Voting ===
Voting occurred again through the combination of three methods:

- Public televoting, carried out via landline and mobile phone.
- Jury of the press room, TV and web.
- Jury of the radio.

Their voting was articulated as follows:

- First night: all of the entrants were judged by the jury of the press room, TV and web.
- Second night: half of the entrants were judged through a 50/50 split system by means of televoting and the jury of the radio, to be added up to the results of the first night. The four newcomers were judged by all three juries, determining the two finalists.
- Third night: the other half of the main entrants and the two newcomer finalists were judged as on the previous night, with the winner of the latter section being proclaimed.
- Fourth night: the covers were judged through a split system by means of the televoting (34%) and the two juries (33% each), determining the winner of the night.
- Fifth night: the entrants were judged through a split system by means of the televote (34%), and the two juries (33% each), to be added up to the results of the first three nights; ultimately, a final voting round (with the same split system) was held among the top five, which determined the winner.

== Selections ==
=== Sanremo Giovani 2024 ===
The four artists competing in the Newcomers' section were determined through the Sanremo Giovani format, with the contestants, aged 16 to 26, being selected via a standard selection and the separate Area Sanremo competition. The contest was held from 12 November to 18 December 2024, and took place in three stages:

- four weekly "challenges" on 12, 19, 26 November and 3 December, presented by Alessandro Cattelan and airing on Rai 2, each seeing six contestants, three of them advancing to the next stage based on the votes of the musical committee;
- a semi-final on 10 December, also presented by Cattelan and airing on Rai 2, where six of the remaining twelve contestants were eliminated by the musical committee;
- a final on 18 December 2024, titled Sarà Sanremo, held at the Sanremo Casino Theatre and presented by Carlo Conti, airing live on Rai 1; the six finalists competed for three spots in the festival, while another two, selected from Area Sanremo, competed for an additional place; the results were determined by the votes of the musical committee.

==== Standard selection ====
Online submissions for the standard selection were open between 10 July and 8 October 2024. On 17 October 2024, it was announced that 564 acts had applied, 46 of which were selected by a musical committee – composed of professionals Ema Stokholma, Carolina Rey, Manola Moslehi, Enrico Cremonesi and Daniele Battaglia, and chaired by the artistic director (Conti) with RAI director Claudio Fasulo – to take part in an audition round in Rome on 23 October, where 24 artists were selected to compete. Their songs were released on 31 October 2024.

Selected entries
Artist	Song	Songwriter(s)
Alex Wyse	"Rockstar"	Alessandro Rina; Francesco Facchinetti; Matteo Ieva
Angelica Bove	"La nostra malinconia"	Alessandro Raina; Davide Simonetta; Paolo Antonacci
Angie	"Scorpione"	Angelica Paola Ibba; Fabio Pizzoli; Pietro Celona; Pietro Posani
Arianna Rozzo	"J'adore"	Arianna Rozzo; Francesco Dini
Bosnia	"Vengo dal sud"	Filippo Bosnia; Giuseppe La Rosa
Ciao sono Vale	"Una nuvola mi copre"	Manuel Franco Rocati; Nicolò Belloni; Valeria Fusarri
Cosmonauti Borghesi	"Aurora tropicale"	Alessandro Mastropietro; Leonardo Rese; Marco Cestrone
Dea Culpa	"Nuda"	Alessandro Fava; Alessia Gerardi; Anas El Hirech
Giin	"Tornare al mare"	Alessandro Donadei; Ginevra De Tommasi
Grelmos	"Flashback"	Gabriele Coco; Greta Jasmin El Moktadi; Paolo Muscolino; Roberto Strano
Mazzariello	"Amarsi per lavoro"	Antonio Mazzariello; Matteo Domenichelli
Mew	"Oh My God"	Francesco Catitti; Jacopo Ettorre; Paride Surace; Valentina Turchetto
Moska Drunkard	"Trinacria"	Cristina Rizzo; Marco Giordano; Silvia Vavolo
Nicol	"Come mare"	Enrico Brun; Francesco Amato; Michael Tenisci; Nicol Castagna; Stefano Marletta
Orion	"Diamanti nel fango"	Dario Bovenzi
Questo e Quello	"Bella balla"	Francesco Mannella Vardè; Lorenzo Di Blasi; Stefano D'Angelo
Rea	"Cielo aperto"	Federico Cimini; Maria Mircea
Sea John	"Se fossi felice"	Giovanni Maresca
Selmi	"Forse per sempre"	Davide De Blasio; Gianpiero Gentile; Niccolò Selmi; Raffaele Esposito
Settembre	"Vertebre"	Andrea Settembre; Laura Di Lenola; Manuel Finotti
Sidy	"Tutte le volte"	David Anokye Yeboah; Iacopo Sinigaglia; Lorenzo Vizzini Bisaccia; Samuel Balice; Sidy Lamine Casse
Synergy	"Fiamma"	Aurora Mina Cortes; Lucia Battistini; Massimiliano Giorgetti
Tancredi	"Standing Ovation"	Adel Al Kassem; Gianmarco Grande; Giordano Colombo; Tancredi Cantù Rajnoldi
Vale LP and Lil Jolie	"Dimmi tu quando sei pronto per fare l'amore"	Francesca Calearo; Valentina Sanseverino

==== Area Sanremo 2024 ====
The rules of the Area Sanremo selection, organised by the Municipality of Sanremo alongside the Sanremo Symphonic Orchestra Foundation, were released on 3 September 2024, with the opening of an online application platform lasting until 18 October 2024. The 336 submitting acts were auditioned by a musical committee between 16 and 21 November 2024 at the Sanremo Palafiori, with the 24 qualifiers from this phase attending a final round on 22 November; there, ten winners were proclaimed, among whom two Sanremo Giovani finalists were selected on 23 November. The choice was revealed on 10 December, during the semi-final.

Area Sanremo finalists (winning entries are marked in bold; selected Sanremo Giovani entrants are underlined)
- **Albe – "Finalmente"**
- Aria
- Arianna
- Ascanio
- Bels
- **Cartapesta – "Lamponi"**
- **Crytical – "L'ultimo istante"**
- Daniel Posniak
- **Djomi – "Il mio ultimo pregio"**
- EJ
- **Etra – "Spazio (tra le dita)"**
- Gabriele Esposito
- **Hanami – "Luci spente"**
- Jore
- **Kimono – "Fuori tempo"**
- LB Prada
- **Løvinne – "Iceberg"**
- Maddalena
- **Maria Tomba – "Goodbye (Voglio good vibes)"**
- Niveo
- Petr3sku
- Sara Russo
- Shori
- **Sofia Sole – "Briciole"**

Selected entries
Artist	Song	Songwriters
Etra	"Spazio (tra le dita)"	Alessio Pipan; Daniele Dibiaggio; Andrea Perna
Maria Tomba	"Goodbye (Voglio good vibes)"	Maria Tomba; Alfredo Bruno; Giulia Guerra; Mirko Guerra; Salvatore Mineo

==== Challenges ====
First challenge night – 12 November 2024
Challenge	R/O	Artist	Song	Result
I	1	Synergy	"Fiamma"	—N/a
I	2	**Tancredi**	**"Standing Ovation"**	**Advanced**
II	3	**Mew**	**"Oh My God"**	**Advanced**
II	4	Sidy	"Tutte le volte"	—N/a
III	5	Angie	"Scorpione"	—N/a
III	6	**Mazzariello**	**"Amarsi per lavoro"**	**Advanced**

Second challenge night – 19 November 2024
Challenge	R/O	Artist	Song	Result
I	1	**Grelmos**	**"Flashback"**	**Advanced**
I	2	Rea	"Cielo aperto"	—N/a
II	3	**Settembre**	**"Vertebre"**	**Advanced**
II	4	Moska Drunkard	"Trinacria"	—N/a
III	5	Ciao sono Vale	"Una nuvola mi copre"	—N/a
III	6	**Selmi**	**"Forse per sempre"**	**Advanced**

Third challenge night – 26 November 2024
Challenge	R/O	Artist	Song	Result
I	1	**Alex Wyse**	**"Rockstar"**	**Advanced**
I	2	Nicol	"Come mare"	—N/a
II	3	Cosmonauti Borghesi	"Aurora tropicale"	—N/a
II	4	**Bosnia**	**"Vengo dal sud"**	**Advanced**
III	5	Giin	"Tornare al mare"	—N/a
III	6	**Arianna Rozzo**	**"J'adore"**	**Advanced**

Fourth challenge night – 3 December 2024
Challenge	R/O	Artist	Song	Result
I	1	**Vale LP and Lil Jolie**	**"Dimmi tu quando sei pronto per fare l'amore"**	**Advanced**
I	2	Orion	"Diamanti nel fango"	—N/a
II	3	**Angelica Bove**	**"La nostra malinconia"**	**Advanced**
II	4	Sea John	"Se fossi felice"	—N/a
III	5	**Questo e Quello**	**"Bella balla"**	**Advanced**
III	6	Dea Culpa	"Nuda"	—N/a

==== Semi-final ====
Semi-final – 10 December 2024
Challenge	R/O	Artist	Song	Result
I	1	Grelmos	"Flashback"	—N/a
I	2	**Settembre**	**"Vertebre"**	**Finalist**
II	3	**Vale LP and Lil Jolie**	**"Dimmi tu quando sei pronto per fare l'amore"**	**Finalist**
II	4	Arianna Rozzo	"J'adore"	—N/a
III	5	Tancredi	"Standing Ovation"	—N/a
III	6	**Alex Wyse**	**"Rockstar"**	**Finalist**
IV	7	**Mew**	**"Oh My God"**	**Finalist**
IV	8	Questo e Quello	"Bella balla"	—N/a
V	9	**Angelica Bove**	**"La nostra malinconia"**	**Finalist**
V	10	Mazzariello	"Amarsi per lavoro"	—N/a
VI	11	Bosnia	"Vengo dal sud"	—N/a
VI	12	**Selmi**	**"Forse per sempre"**	**Finalist**

==== Final ====
Final – 18 December 2024
Challenge	R/O	Artist	Song	Result
I	1	Mew	"Oh My God"	—N/a
I	2	**Vale LP and Lil Jolie**	**"Dimmi tu quando sei pronto per fare l'amore"**	**Winner**
II	3	**Alex Wyse**	**"Rockstar"**	**Winner**
II	4	Selmi	"Forse per sempre"	—N/a
III	5	Angelica Bove	"La nostra malinconia"	—N/a
III	6	**Settembre**	**"Vertebre"**	**Winner**
IV	7	**Maria Tomba**	**"Goodbye (Voglio good vibes)"**	**Winner**
IV	8	Etra	"Spazio (tra le dita)"	—N/a

== Competing entries ==
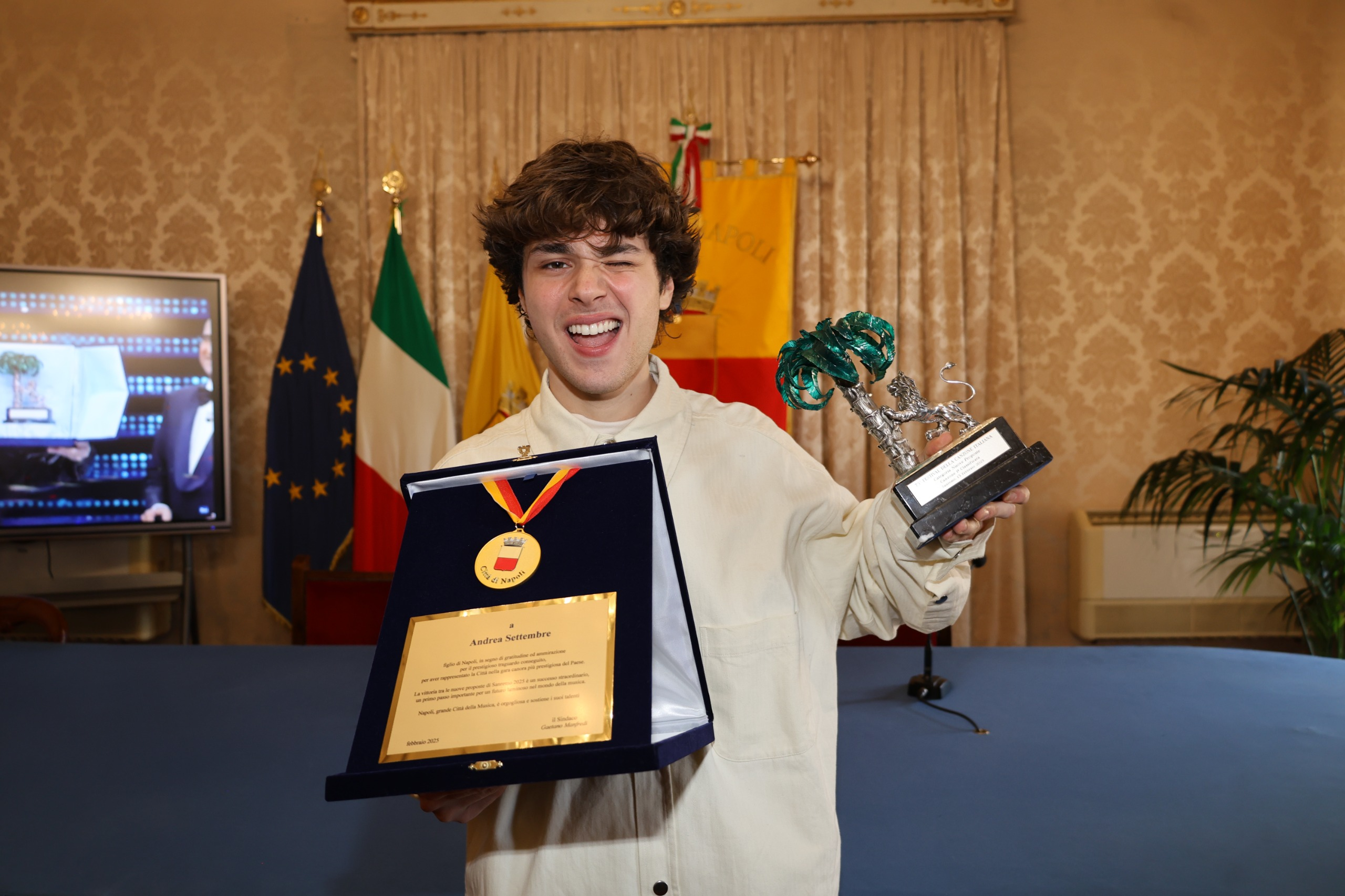
Newcomers' winner Settembre holding his Sanremo trophy and an additional award from his own municipality

The contest featured a Big Artists section and a Newcomers' section. The entries competing in the former were selected by the artistic director both from public submissions and by direct invitation, and were announced on 1 December 2024; the number of entries, originally planned to be 24, was later announced to be higher and finally revealed to be 30. Four acts, as determined through the Sanremo Giovani format, competed in the latter section. The titles of the Big Artists' entries were announced during Sarà Sanremo, a special broadcast of 18 December 2024 in which the Sanremo Giovani final was included.

Upon the announcement of the new artistic director, Italian consumers association Codacons issued a statement requesting that Conti establish a professional committee to select the competing entries, to ensure that they meet musical standards and that their selection is not based on the artists' "number of social media followers, web views or temporary fame deriving from their participation in singing talent shows", as well as the inclusion of a Codacons representative in each phase of the preparations in order to guarantee public transparency. However, this was not granted, and shortly before the announcement of the competing artists, Codacons filed a complaint to RAI over some of the rumoured participants, requesting that any songs featuring "wrong, miseducative or dangerous messages" be banned from the festival.

On 29 January 2025, Emis Killa, who was among the selected entrants with the song "Demoni", announced his intention to withdraw from the competition due to legal issues. RAI stated that he would not be replaced.

Big Artists section
Artist(s)	Song	Songwriter(s)	Conductor	Rank	Awards
Achille Lauro	"Incoscienti giovani"	Lauro De Marinis; Paolo Antonacci; Davide Simonetta; Daniele Nelli; Gregorio Calculli; Matteo Ciceroni; Simon Pietro Manzari	Davide Rossi	7	—N/a
Bresh	"La tana del granchio"	Andrea Brasi; Luca Di Blasi; Giorgio De Lauri; Luca Ghiazzi	Diego Calvetti	11	—N/a
Brunori Sas	"L'albero delle noci"	Dario Brunori	Stefano Amato (Note: Mirko Onofrio on the fourth night.)	3	Musical commission's "Sergio Bardotti" Award for Best Lyrics
Clara	"Febbre"	Clara Soccini; Jacopo Ettorre; Francesca Calearo; Dario Faini; Federica Abbate	Valeriano Chiaravalle	27	—N/a
Coma_Cose	"Cuoricini"	Fausto Zanardelli; Francesca Mesiano; Antonio Filippelli; Gianmarco Manilardi	Enrico Melozzi	10	—N/a
Elodie	"Dimenticarsi alle 7"	Elodie Di Patrizi; Davide Petrella; Davide Simonetta	Davide Rossi	12	—N/a
Fedez	"Battito"	Federico Leonardo Lucia; Alessandro La Cava; Federica Abbate; Nicola Lazzarin	Valeriano Chiaravalle	4	—N/a
Francesca Michielin	"Fango in paradiso"	Francesca Michielin; Davide Simonetta; Alessandro Raina	Carmelo Patti (Note: Riccardo Zangirolami on the fourth night.)	21	—N/a
Francesco Gabbani	"Viva la vita"	Francesco Gabbani; Carlo Gabelloni; Luigi De Crescenzo; Davide Simonetta; Andrea Vittori; Giuseppe Zito	Fabio Gurian	8	—N/a
Gaia	"Chiamo io chiami tu"	Gaia Gozzi; Davide Petrella; Stefano Tognini	Riccardo Zangirolami	26	—N/a
Giorgia	"La cura per me"	Giorgia Todrani; Riccardo Fabbriconi; Michele Zocca	Enzo Campagnoli	6	TIM Award for Most Voted Artist on TIM Media Platforms
Irama	"Lentamente"	Filippo Maria Fanti; Riccardo Fabbriconi; Michele Zocca; Giuseppe Colonnelli	Giulio Nenna	9	—N/a
Joan Thiele	"Eco"	Alessandra Joan Thiele; Federica Abbate; Simone Benussi; Emanuele Triglia	Carmelo Patti	20	—N/a
The Kolors	"Tu con chi fai l'amore"	Antonio Fiordispino; Davide Petrella; Edoardo D'Erme; Stefano Tognini	Valeriano Chiaravalle	14	—N/a
Lucio Corsi	"Volevo essere un duro"	Lucio Corsi; Tommaso Sabatini	Davide Rossi	2	"Mia Martini" Critics Award; Assomusica Award for Best Live Performance by an Emerging Artist
Marcella Bella	"Pelle diamante"	Marcella Bella; Senatore Cirenga; Alessandro Simoncini; Pasquale Mammaro; Marco Rettani	Fabio Gurian	29	—N/a
Massimo Ranieri	"Tra le mani un cuore"	Tiziano Ferro; Filippo Neviani; Giulia Anania; Marta Venturini	Lucio Fabbri (Note: No conductor on the fourth night, as the cover was performed a cappella.)	23	—N/a
Modà	"Non ti dimentico"	Francesco Silvestre	Andrea Benassai	22	—N/a
Noemi	"Se t'innamori muori"	Alessandro Mahmoud; Riccardo Fabbriconi; Michele Zocca	Michele Zocca (Note: Enzo Campagnoli on the fourth night.)	13	—N/a
Olly	"Balorda nostalgia"	Federico Olivieri; Julien Boverod; Pierfrancesco Pasini	Giovanni Pallotti	1	Winner of the "Big Artists" section – Golden Lion
Rkomi	"Il ritmo delle cose"	Mirko Martorana; Jacopo Ettorre; Matteo Pierotti; Francesco Catitti; Luca Faraone; Pablo Miguel Lombroni	Riccardo Zangirolami	28	—N/a
Rocco Hunt	"Mille vote ancora"	Rocco Pagliarulo; Gabriel Rossi; Marco Salvaderi; Davide Simonetta; Stefano Tognini; Paolo Antonacci; Lorenzo Santarelli	Enzo Campagnoli	15	—N/a
Rose Villain	"Fuorilegge"	Rosa Luini; Federica Abbate; Nicola Lazzarin; Andrea Ferrara	Davide Rossi	19	—N/a
Sarah Toscano	"Amarcord"	Sarah Toscano; Jacopo Ettorre; Federica Abbate; Federico Mercuri; Giordano Cremona; Leonardo Grillotti; Eugenio Maimone	Valeriano Chiaravalle	17	—N/a
Serena Brancale	"Anema e core"	Serena Brancale; Federica Abbate; Jacopo Ettorre; Manuel Finotti; Nicola Lazzarin	Nicole Brancale (Note: Fabio Barnaba on the fourth night.)	24	—N/a
Shablo feat. Guè, Joshua and Tormento	"La mia parola"	Pablo Miguel Lombroni; Cosimo Fini; Joshua Bale; Massimiliano Cellamaro; Edoardo Medici; Luca Faraone; Roberto Lamanna; Ernesto Conocchia	Luca Faraone	18	—N/a
Simone Cristicchi	"Quando sarai piccola"	Simone Cristicchi; Erika Mineo; Nicola Brunialti	Valter Sivilotti	5	Orchestra's "Giancarlo Bigazzi" Award for Best Musical Composition; Press room's "Lucio Dalla" Award; Lunezia Award
Tony Effe	"Damme 'na mano"	Nicolò Rapisarda; Luca Faraone; Diego Vincenzo Vettraino	Enzo Campagnoli	25	—N/a
Willie Peyote	"Grazie ma no grazie"	Guglielmo Bruno; Daniel Bestonzo; Luca Romeo; Alex Andrea Vella	Daniel Bestonzo	16	—N/a

Newcomers' section
Artist(s)	Song	Songwriter(s)	Conductor	Rank	Awards
Alex Wyse	"Rockstar"	Alessandro Rina; Francesco Facchinetti; Matteo Ieva	Valeriano Chiaravalle	2	—N/a
Maria Tomba	"Goodbye (Voglio good vibes)"	Maria Tomba; Alfredo Bruno; Giulia Guerra; Mirko Guerra; Salvatore Mineo	Fabio Barnaba	3	—N/a
Settembre	"Vertebre"	Andrea Settembre; Laura Di Lenola; Manuel Finotti	Fabio Barnaba	1	Winner of the Newcomers' section – Silver Lion; "Mia Martini" Critics Award; Press room's "Lucio Dalla" Award; Nuovo IMAIE "Enzo Jannacci" Award
Vale LP and Lil Jolie	"Dimmi tu quando sei pronto per fare l'amore"	Valentina Sanseverino; Francesca Calearo	Carmelo Patti	3	—N/a

== Shows ==
=== First night ===
All 29 artists performed their competing songs. The top 5 were announced in a random order.

First night – 11 February 2025
R/O	Artist	Song	Press jury ranking
1	Gaia	"Chiamo io chiami tu"	23
2	Francesco Gabbani	"Viva la vita"	10
3	Rkomi	"Il ritmo delle cose"	28
4	Noemi	"Se t'innamori muori"	7
5	Irama	"Lentamente"	26
6	Coma_Cose	"Cuoricini"	8
7	Simone Cristicchi	"Quando sarai piccola"	2
8	Marcella Bella	"Pelle diamante"	27
9	Achille Lauro	"Incoscienti giovani"	5
10	Giorgia	"La cura per me"	1
11	Willie Peyote	"Grazie ma no grazie"	14
12	Rose Villain	"Fuorilegge"	17
13	Olly	"Balorda nostalgia"	6
14	Elodie	"Dimenticarsi alle 7"	12
15	Shablo feat. Guè, Joshua and Tormento	"La mia parola"	18
16	Massimo Ranieri	"Tra le mani un cuore"	16
17	Tony Effe	"Damme 'na mano"	29
18	Serena Brancale	"Anema e core"	21
19	Brunori Sas	"L'albero delle noci"	3
20	Modà	"Non ti dimentico"	25
21	Clara	"Febbre"	24
22	Lucio Corsi	"Volevo essere un duro"	4
23	Fedez	"Battito"	11
24	Bresh	"La tana del granchio"	19
25	Sarah Toscano	"Amarcord"	22
26	Joan Thiele	"Eco"	15
27	Rocco Hunt	"Mille vote ancora"	20
28	Francesca Michielin	"Fango in paradiso"	13
29	The Kolors	"Tu con chi fai l'amore"	9

=== Second night ===
Fifteen of the competing artists performed their competing songs for a second time. The top 5 were announced in a random order.

The night was opened by the Newcomers' semi-final.

Second night – 12 February 2025
R/O	Artist	Song	Night rankings			
R/O	Artist	Song	Radio jury	Televote		Total ranking
R/O	Artist	Song	Radio jury	%	Place	Total ranking
1	Rocco Hunt	"Mille vote ancora"	15	5.93%	7	8
2	Elodie	"Dimenticarsi alle 7"	9	5.20%	8	7
3	Lucio Corsi	"Volevo essere un duro"	4	10.66%	3	5
4	The Kolors	"Tu con chi fai l'amore"	5	2.42%	9	9
5	Serena Brancale	"Anema e core"	13	1.62%	12	13
6	Fedez	"Battito"	11	19.39%	2	2
7	Francesca Michielin	"Fango in paradiso"	10	1.60%	13	12
8	Simone Cristicchi	"Quando sarai piccola"	2	20.49%	1	1
9	Marcella Bella	"Pelle diamante"	14	0.72%	15	15
10	Bresh	"La tana del granchio"	8	6.02%	6	6
11	Achille Lauro	"Incoscienti giovani"	3	10.55%	4	4
12	Giorgia	"La cura per me"	1	9.79%	5	3
13	Rkomi	"Il ritmo delle cose"	12	1.54%	14	14
14	Rose Villain	"Fuorilegge"	7	2.03%	11	11
15	Willie Peyote	"Grazie ma no grazie"	6	2.05%	10	10

Semi-final (Newcomers) – 12 February 2025
Challenge	R/O	Artist	Song	Press jury	Radio jury	Televote		Result
Challenge	R/O	Artist	Song	Press jury	Radio jury	%	Place	Result
I	1	Alex Wyse	"Rockstar"	1	1	86.96%	1	Finalist
I	2	Vale LP and Lil Jolie	"Dimmi tu quando sei pronto per fare l'amore"	2	2	13.04%	2	—N/a
II	3	Maria Tomba	"Goodbye (Voglio good vibes)"	2	2	14.14%	2	—N/a
II	4	Settembre	"Vertebre"	1	1	85.86%	1	Finalist

=== Third night ===
The remaining fourteen artists performed their competing songs for a second time. The top 5 were announced in a random order.

The night was closed by the Newcomers' final.

Third night – 13 February 2025
R/O	Artist	Song	Night rankings			
R/O	Artist	Song	Radio jury	Televote		Total ranking
R/O	Artist	Song	Radio jury	%	Place	Total ranking
1	Clara	"Febbre"	12	1.24%	14	14
2	Brunori Sas	"L'albero delle noci"	2	35.09%	1	1
3	Sarah Toscano	"Amarcord"	10	3.72%	7	8
4	Massimo Ranieri	"Tra le mani un cuore"	11	2.58%	10	11
5	Joan Thiele	"Eco"	7	1.56%	12	12
6	Shablo feat. Guè, Joshua and Tormento	"La mia parola"	9	2.85%	8	10
7	Noemi	"Se t'innamori muori"	4	2.72%	9	6
8	Olly	"Balorda nostalgia"	3	26.22%	2	2
9	Coma_Cose	"Cuoricini"	1	2.07%	11	5
10	Modà	"Non ti dimentico"	13	4.24%	5	9
11	Tony Effe	"Damme 'na mano"	14	4.96%	4	7
12	Irama	"Lentamente"	8	7.20%	3	3
13	Francesco Gabbani	"Viva la vita"	5	5.24%	6	4
14	Gaia	"Chiamo io chiami tu"	6	1.32%	13	13

Final (Newcomers) – 13 February 2025
R/O	Artist	Song	Press jury	Radio jury	Televote		Total score	Place
R/O	Artist	Song	Press jury	Radio jury	%	Place	Total score	Place
1	Settembre	"Vertebre"	1	1	49.03%	2	52.5%	1
2	Alex Wyse	"Rockstar"	2	2	50.97%	1	47.5%	2

=== Fourth night ===
The artists each performed an Italian or international song from the past (or a medley thereof), duetting with each other or with one or more guest performers. A winner for the night was proclaimed, but, unlike previous years, the results for the night were not added to the overall score. During the night, only the top 10 were announced.

Fourth night – 14 February 2025
R/O	Artist(s)	Guest artist(s)	Song	Rankings				
R/O	Artist(s)	Guest artist(s)	Song	Radio jury	Press jury	Televote		Total ranking
R/O	Artist(s)	Guest artist(s)	Song	Radio jury	Press jury	%	Place	Total ranking
1	Rose Villain	Chiello	"Fiori rosa, fiori di pesco"	25	25	1.07%	19	26
2	Modà	Francesco Renga	"Angelo"	24	24	2.33%	14	18
3	Clara	Il Volo	"The Sound of Silence"	13	18	5.11%	8	9
4	Noemi and Tony Effe	—N/a	"Tutto il resto è noia"	26	26	2.16%	15	21
5	Francesca Michielin and Rkomi	—N/a	"La nuova stella di Broadway"	21	23	1.50%	18	19
6	Lucio Corsi	Topo Gigio	"Nel blu, dipinto di blu"	2	2	11.66%	2	2
7	Serena Brancale	Alessandra Amoroso	"If I Ain't Got You"	3	4	2.69%	13	13
8	Irama	Arisa	"Say Something"	8	10	6.44%	6	6
9	Gaia	Toquinho	"La voglia, la pazzia"	11	20	0.61%	24	22
10	The Kolors	Sal Da Vinci	"Rossetto e caffè"	7	13	4.42%	10	10
11	Marcella Bella	Twin Violins	"L'emozione non ha voce"	22	22	0.76%	23	24
12	Rocco Hunt	Clementino	"Yes I Know My Way"	10	7	5.73%	7	7
13	Francesco Gabbani	Tricarico	"Io sono Francesco"	23	17	1.69%	16	15
14	Giorgia	Annalisa	"Skyfall"	1	1	14.27%	1	1
15	Simone Cristicchi	Amara	"La cura"	4	8	3.49%	12	11
16	Sarah Toscano	Ofenbach	"Overdrive" / "Be Mine"	20	16	1.59%	17	14
17	Coma_Cose	Johnson Righeira	"L'estate sta finendo"	5	9	0.54%	25	16
18	Joan Thiele	Frah Quintale	"Che cosa c'è"	19	21	0.81%	21	23
19	Olly	Goran Bregović and the Wedding & Funeral Band	"Il pescatore"	16	15	7.34%	4	4
20	Achille Lauro and Elodie	—N/a	"A mano a mano" / "Folle città"	6	3	4.98%	9	8
21	Massimo Ranieri	Neri per Caso	"Quando"	14	14	0.78%	22	20
22	Willie Peyote	Tiromancino and Ditonellapiaga	"Un tempo piccolo"	18	19	0.29%	26	25
23	Brunori Sas	Dimartino and Riccardo Sinigallia	"L'anno che verrà"	15	11	6.69%	5	5
24	Fedez	Marco Masini	"Bella stronza"	12	5	8.53%	3	3
25 (Note: Due to technical problems during their first performance, the duo performed their cover again at the end of the night.)	Bresh	Cristiano De André	"Crêuza de mä"	9	6	3.61%	11	12
26	Shablo feat. Guè, Joshua and Tormento	Neffa	"Amor de mi vida" / "Aspettando il sole"	17	12	0.93%	20	17

=== Fifth night ===
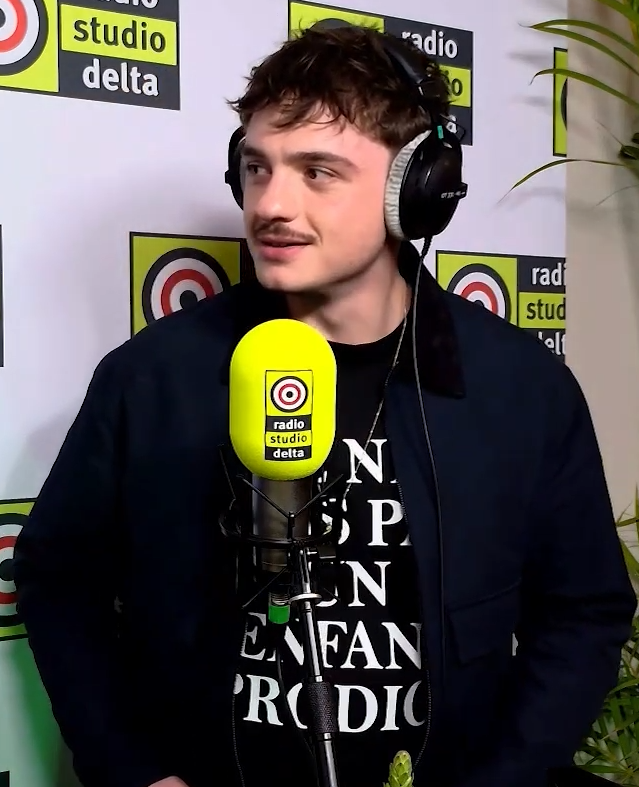
Olly was the winner of Sanremo Music Festival 2025.

All 29 artists performed their competing songs. The top 5 artists of the combined rankings of this and the first three shows advanced to the superfinal, where the juries and televote determined the winner.

Advanced to the superfinal

Final – 15 February 2025
R/O	Artist	Song	Provisional ranking	Night rankings					Final ranking
R/O	Artist	Song	Provisional ranking	Radio jury	Press jury	Televote		Total ranking	Final ranking
R/O	Artist	Song	Provisional ranking	Radio jury	Press jury	%	Place	Total ranking	Final ranking
1	Francesca Michielin	"Fango in paradiso"	25	19	21	0.58%	23	22	21
2	Willie Peyote	"Grazie ma no grazie"	20	8	12	1.09%	16	12	16
3	Marcella Bella	"Pelle diamante"	29	27	27	0.37%	28	29	29
4	Bresh	"La tana del granchio"	9	14	17	2.15%	10	11	11
5	Modà	"Non ti dimentico"	17	28	28	1.29%	13	26	22
6	Rose Villain	"Fuorilegge"	22	16	15	1.06%	17	15	19
7	Tony Effe	"Damme 'na mano"	13	29	29	1.86%	11	24	25
8	Clara	"Febbre"	28	24	26	0.49%	25	28	27
9	Serena Brancale	"Anema e core"	26	20	16	0.87%	20	19	24
10	Brunori Sas	"L'albero delle noci"	1	5	4	17.44%	1	1	1
11	Francesco Gabbani	"Viva la vita"	10	13	10	2.38%	9	8	8
12	Noemi	"Se t'innamori muori"	14	9	9	0.79%	21	13	13
13	Rocco Hunt	"Mille vote ancora"	12	26	23	1.55%	12	18	15
14	The Kolors	"Tu con chi fai l'amore"	18	10	18	0.71%	22	17	14
15	Olly	"Balorda nostalgia"	2	7	5	16.26%	2	2	2
16	Achille Lauro	"Incoscienti giovani"	6	3	3	8.54%	5	5	7
17	Coma_Cose	"Cuoricini"	15	4	8	1.24%	14	9	10
18	Giorgia	"La cura per me"	5	1	1	8.03%	6	4	6
19	Simone Cristicchi	"Quando sarai piccola"	3	6	6	3.75%	7	7	4
20	Elodie	"Dimenticarsi alle 7"	11	18	11	1.14%	15	14	12
21	Lucio Corsi	"Volevo essere un duro"	7	2	2	12.31%	3	3	3
22	Irama	"Lentamente"	8	22	25	2.89%	8	10	9
23	Fedez	"Battito"	4	12	7	9.65%	4	6	5
24	Shablo feat. Guè, Joshua and Tormento	"La mia parola"	19	17	13	0.90%	19	16	18
25	Joan Thiele	"Eco"	23	11	14	0.38%	27	21	20
26	Massimo Ranieri	"Tra le mani un cuore"	21	25	20	0.40%	26	27	23
27	Gaia	"Chiamo io chiami tu"	24	15	22	0.33%	29	23	26
28	Rkomi	"Il ritmo delle cose"	27	23	24	0.54%	24	25	28
29	Sarah Toscano	"Amarcord"	16	21	19	0.99%	18	20	17

Superfinal – 15 February 2025
R/O	Artist	Song	Provisional ranking	Second round rankings				Total score	Final ranking
R/O	Artist	Song	Provisional ranking	Radio jury	Press jury	Televote		Total score	Final ranking
R/O	Artist	Song	Provisional ranking	Radio jury	Press jury	%	Place	Total score	Final ranking
1	Fedez	"Battito"	5	5	4	20.51%	3	17.67%	4
2	Simone Cristicchi	"Quando sarai piccola"	4	4	5	6.13%	5	14.78%	5
3	Brunori Sas	"L'albero delle noci"	1	3	3	16.61%	4	20.32%	3
4	Lucio Corsi	"Volevo essere un duro"	3	1	1	25.70%	2	23.39%	2
5	Olly	"Balorda nostalgia"	2	2	2	31.05%	1	23.84%	1

== Special guests and other acts ==
Special guests included:

- first night – Noa and Mira Awad (performing "Imagine"), Jovanotti with Rockin'1000, Gianmarco Tamberi, and Raf;
- second night – Damiano David, Alessandro Borghi, Francesco Del Gaudio, Alessandro Gervasi, BigMama, Edoardo Leo, Pilar Fogliati, Emanuela Fanelli, Maria Chiara Giannetta, Claudia Pandolfi, Vittoria Puccini, Marco Giallini, Maurizio Lastrico, Rocco Papaleo, Claudio Santamaria, Carolina Kostner, Carmine Recano, and Giacomo Giorgio;
- third night – Edoardo Bennato, Samuele Parodi, Dario D'Ambrosi with Teatro Patologico, the main cast of The Sea Beyond, Ermal Meta, and Duran Duran with Victoria De Angelis;
- fourth night – Roberto Benigni, Benji & Fede, and Paolo and Lunitta Kessisoglu;
- fifth night – Gabry Ponte, Alberto Angela, Tedua, Planet Funk, Edoardo Bove, Vanessa Scalera, Stefania Constantini and Amos Mosaner, Mahmood, and Bianca Balti.

In addition, special lifetime achievement awards were handed to Iva Zanicchi (a decades-long recurring contestant and three-time winner of the festival) and Antonello Venditti on the third and fifth night, respectively, and a tribute to late pianist Ezio Bosso was included in the opening night.

== Broadcasts and ratings ==
=== Local broadcast ===
Rai 1 and Rai Radio 2 brought the official broadcasts of the festival in Italy – the latter with commentary by Gino Castaldo and Ema Stokholma. The five evenings were also streamed online via the broadcaster's official online platform RaiPlay.

=== International broadcast ===
Outside Italy, RAI aired the festival on its international channel Rai Italia and made the RaiPlay broadcast available worldwide, including all member countries of the European Broadcasting Union; the festival, serving as the Italian national final for the Eurovision Song Contest, was also broadcast on the Eurovision network.

International broadcasters of the Sanremo Music Festival 2025
Country	Broadcaster(s)	Channel(s)	Show(s)	Commentator(s)	Refs
Albania	RTSH	RTSH 2	Nights 1–3	Andri Xhahu	
Albania	RTSH	RTSH 1	Nights 4–5	Andri Xhahu	
Canada (Note: In addition to regular broadcasters, the recordings of the five shows are available via cable television provider Rogers Cable in Canada.)	ICI Télévision		All shows (Note: Delayed broadcast)	—N/a	
Moldova	TRM	Moldova 1	All shows	Unknown	
Montenegro	RTCG	TVCG 2, Radio 98	All shows	Nebojša Šofranac	
Romania	TVR	TVR 1	All shows	Bogdan Stănescu Nadine Vlădescu and Kyrie Mendél	
Spain	RTVE	RTVE Play	Night 5	Giuseppe di Bella, Irene Mahía and Mawot	
United Kingdom	GlitterBeam		Night 5	Eugenio Ceriello and Michael Walton-Dalzell	

=== Ratings ===
Live show	Timeslot (UTC+1)	Date	Start (8:40 pm – 9:15 pm)		1st time (9:15 pm – 11:30 pm)		2nd time (11:30 pm – 1:30 am)		Overall audience		Ref(s)
Live show	Timeslot (UTC+1)	Date	Viewers (millions)	Share (%)	Viewers (millions)	Share (%)	Viewers (millions)	Share (%)	Viewers (millions)	Share (%)	Ref(s)
1st	8:40 pm	11 February 2025	13.327	51.88	16.199	63.68	8.322	69.25	12.600	65.30	
2nd	8:40 pm	12 February 2025	12.244	50.37	14.848	63.62	7.577	67.14	11.700	64.50	
3rd	8:40 pm	13 February 2025	10.001	60.01	13.243	58.10	6.436	65	10.700	59.80	
4th	8:40 pm	14 February 2025	13.492	56.00	16.658	69.23	9.939	74.00	13.575	70.80	
5th	8:40 pm	15 February 2025	14.100	60.7	16.000	69.0	11.100	79.2	13.400	73.1	

== See also ==
- Italy in the Eurovision Song Contest 2025
