= Cuoricini =

2025 song by Coma_Cose

Single by Coma_Cose
- Language: Italian
- Released: 12 February 2025
- Genre: Dance pop; new wave
- Length: 3:14.
- Label: Warner
- Songwriters: Fausto Zanardelli; Francesca Mesiano; Antonio Filippelli; Gianmarco Manilardi
- Producers: Antonio Filippelli; Gianmarco Manilardi

Coma_Cose singles chronology
"Posti vuoti" (2025)	"Cuoricini" (2025)	"La gelosia" (2025)

Music video
- "Cuoricini" on YouTube

"Cuoricini" (Italian pronunciation: [kworiˈtʃiːni]; transl. "Little Hearts") is a 2025 song by Italian duo Coma_Cose, released by Warner on 12 February 2025. It competed in the Sanremo Music Festival 2025, finishing tenth.

== Composition ==
The song, written by the duo themselves with Antonio Filippelli and Gianmarco Manilardi, the latter also producers of the track, was described by the two artists in an interview with Billboard Italia; Mesiano said about the meaning:

It is a song about relationship in the present day. Some more and some less, we are all victims of social media and the telephone. As much as I personally try to detach myself as much as possible and live in the present moment, I struggle, because we are all a bit succubus to that. The song is about being present. There's a line that says, "One couch, two phones, it's the grave of love"—you live together, you're always together, and you alienate yourself a little bit with your cell phone. It tells about us. It also treats the theme lightly, because the production is quite up, however, the lyrics collide with that. At first listen it may seem like a light piece to you, but the subject matter is also more hostile.

== Critics reception ==
Cuoricini received mixed reviews from specialized critics.

Andrea Laffranchi of Corriere della Sera was not particularly impressed with the song, believing that "after the reggaeton of Malavita another blow to their indie origins. They save themselves with the irony of the lyrics but the risk is that the pop drift will eat away at their uniqueness.". Similarly, Gianni Sibilla of Rockol wrote that in the sounds the song comes across as "a hyper-pop song that starts with straight bass drum", finding it produced to be a catchphrase, stating that "I honestly preferred them with the previous pop, a bit more refined". Claudia Rossi of Il Fatto Quotidiano associates the production with Donatella Rettore and Dargen D'Amico, describing the song as "a big, karaoke-esque, sad-killing mess".

== Music video ==
A music video of "Cuoricini", directed by Fausto Lama himself, was released on 12 February 2025 via the duo's YouTube channel.

== Charts ==
=== Weekly charts ===
Weekly chart performance for "Cuoricini"
Chart (2025)	Peak position
Italy (FIMI)	4
Italy Airplay (EarOne)	1
Switzerland (Schweizer Hitparade)	48

=== Year-end charts ===
Year-end chart performance for "Cuoricini"
Chart (2025)	Position
Italy (FIMI)	15

== Certifications ==
Certifications for "Cuoricini"
Region	Certification	Certified units/sales
Italy (FIMI)	Platinum	200,000^{‡}
^{‡} Sales+streaming figures based on certification alone.
