= Vale LP =

Italian singer-songwriter and rapper (born 1999)

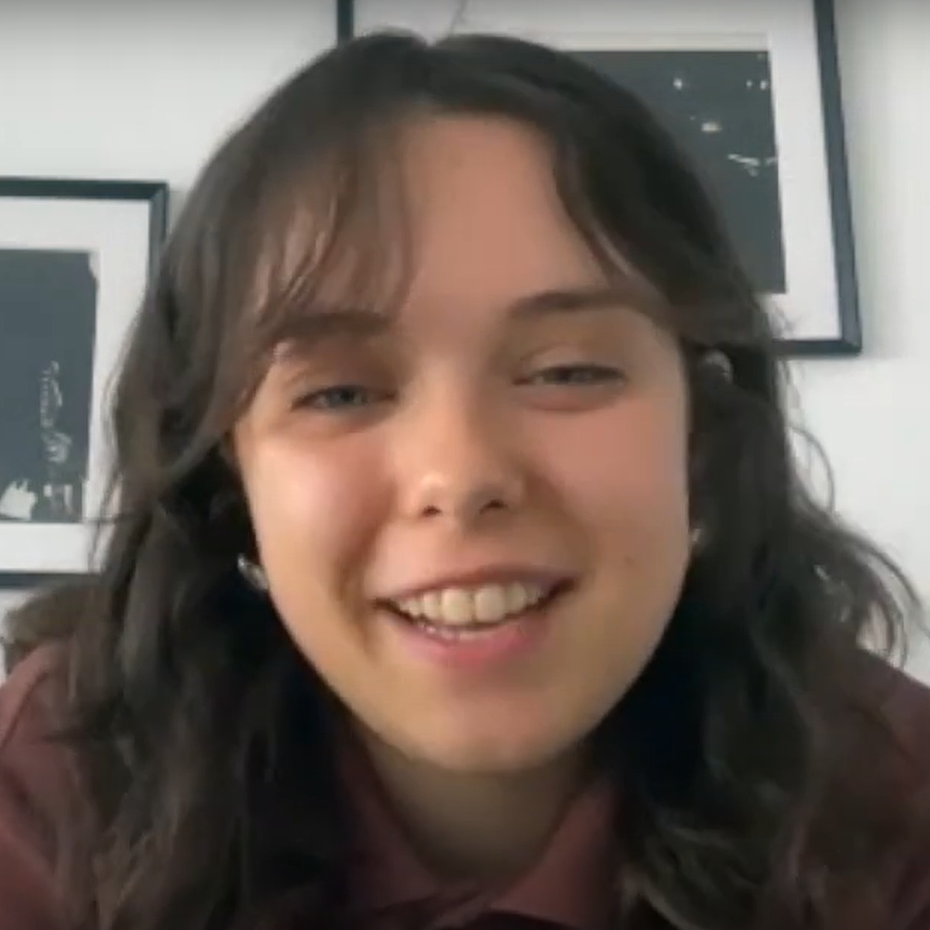
- Vale LP in 2024

Background information
- Born: Valentina Sanseverino; 20 December 1999 (age 26); Naples, Italy
- Genres: Funk; pop; pop rap; rhythm and blues; soul
- Occupations: Singer; songwriter; rapper
- Instrument: Vocals
- Years active: 2018–present
- Label: Sugar Music

Valentina Sanseverino (born 20 December 1999), known professionally as Vale LP, is an Italian singer-songwriter and rapper.

== Life and career ==
Sanseverino was born in 1999 in Naples and grew up in Sparanise, in the province of Caserta. She began her career in 2018 by releasing music on SoundCloud and made her official debut in 2020 with the single "Carini". Her debut EP, Fine fra' me, was released in May 2020.

In 2021, she participated in X Factor, where she was eliminated in the live phase, and released several singles, such as "Chéri" and "Porcella". In 2023, she released her second EP, E sono felice, and participated in the final of Sanremo Giovani with the song "Stronza", finishing in fourth place. In 2024, she released the single "Fortuna" and her debut album Guagliona.

Vale LP also participated in the 2024 edition of Sanremo Giovani alongside Lil Jolie with the song "Dimmi tu quando sei pronto per fare l'amore", qualifying for the "Newcomers" section of the Sanremo Music Festival 2025, which was eventually won by Settembre.

== Discography ==
=== Studio albums ===
Title	Album details
Guagliona	Release date: 17 May 2024; Label: Sugar Music
Le ragazze della valle (with Lil Jolie)	Release date: 23 May 2025; Label: Sugar Music

=== Extended plays ===
Title	Album details
Fine fra' me	Release date: 10 May 2020; Label: Conspiracy Agency
E sono felice	Release date: 30 June 2023; Label: Epic, Sony Music

=== Singles ===
Title	Year	Peak chart positions	Album or EP
Title	Year	ITA	Album or EP
"Carini"	2020	—	Non-album single
"Temporale" (with Close Listen and Zollo)	2021	—	Angeli
"Amerika"	2021	—	Non-album single
"Chéri"	2021	—	E sono felice
"Giardino"	2022	—	E sono felice
"Porcella"	2022	—	E sono felice
"Saliva" (featuring Tripolare)	2023	—	E sono felice
"Stronza"	2023	—	Guagliona
"Fortuna"	2024	—	Guagliona
"Guagliona" (featuring Lil Jolie)	2024	—	Guagliona
"Dimmi tu quando sei pronto per fare l'amore" (with Lil Jolie)	2024	55	Le ragazze della valle
"Le ragazze della valle" (with Lil Jolie)	2025	—	Le ragazze della valle
"Dalle 9 alle 9" (with Lil Jolie featuring Irbis)	2025	—	Le ragazze della valle
"Googleamore" (with Lil Jolie)	2025	—	Le ragazze della valle
"—" denotes singles that did not chart or were not released.

== Television ==
Year	Broadcaster	Title	Role	Notes
2021	Sky Uno	X Factor	Contestant	Talent show (season 15)
2023	Rai 1	Sanremo Giovani	Contestant	Selection for annual music festival; 4th place
2024	Rai 1	Sanremo Giovani	Contestant	Selection for annual music festival; selected
2025	Rai 1	Sanremo Music Festival	Contestant (Newcomers' section)	Annual music festival
