= Rocco Hunt =

Italian rapper (born 1994)

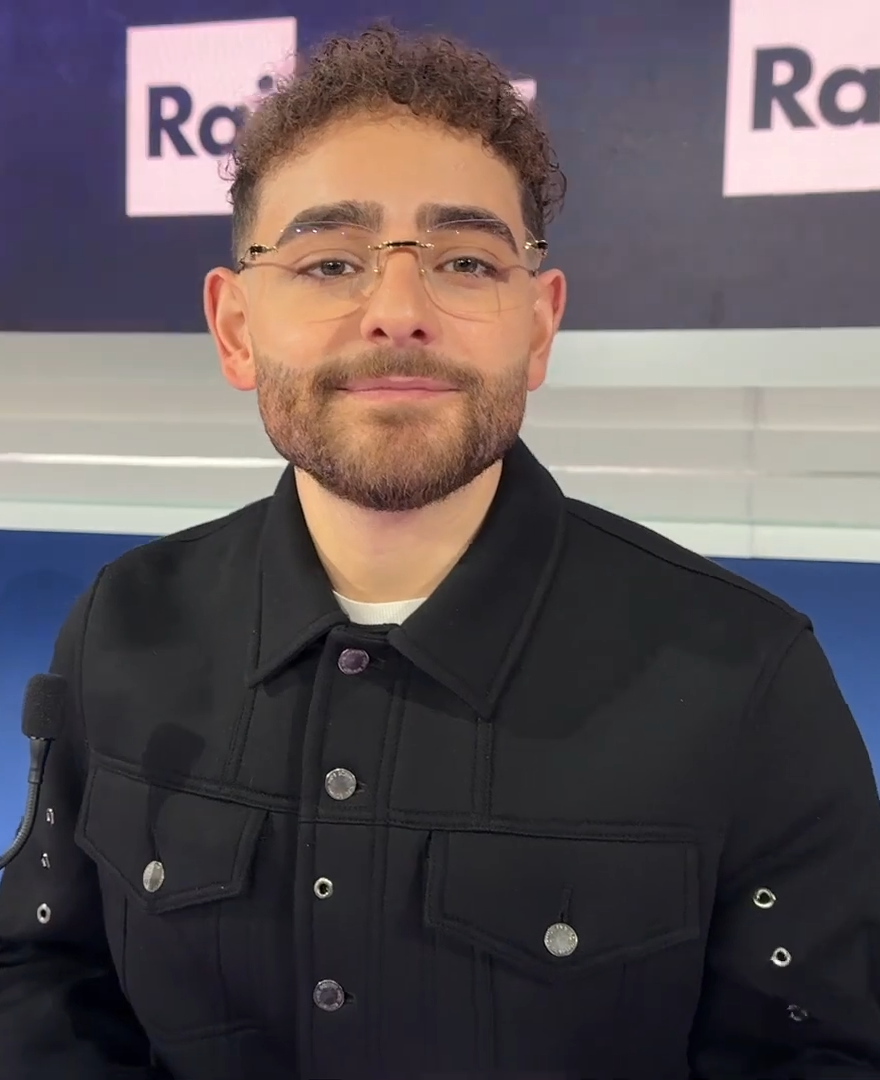
- Hunt in February 2025

Background information
- Born: Rocco Pagliarulo; 21 November 1994 (age 31); Salerno, Italy
- Genres: Pop rap; hip hop
- Occupation: Rapper
- Years active: 2005–present
- Labels: Sony Music; Honiro Label; Dint Recordz

Rocco Pagliarulo (born 21 November 1994), known professionally as Rocco Hunt, is an Italian rapper from Salerno. He rose to fame after winning the Newcomers section of the Sanremo Music Festival 2014 with the song "Nu juorno buono".

== Career ==
In 2014 he participated in and won the Newcomers section of the Sanremo Music Festival 2014 with the song "Nu juorno buono", for which he also won the Emmanuele Luzzati Prize and the Assomusica Prize. Both the title of the song, and several verses of the lyrics were written in the Neapolitan dialect.

He took part in the Big artists section of the 2016 festival with "Wake Up", a second song featuring the Neapolitan dialect, eventually placing 9th. On the third night of the festival he performed a cover of the classic Neapolitan song "Tu vuò fà l'americano" by Renato Carosone.

Hunt participated for a third time in Sanremo Music Festival in 2025. He placed 15th with the song "Mille vote ancora". Hunt participated for a third time with a song written partially in Neapolitan dialect. On the fourth night of the festival, alongside rapper Clementino, he performed a cover of the song Yes I Know My Way by Pino Daniele.

He has released five studio albums to date, with tracks including collaborations from other notable artists such as Noyz Narcos, Clementino, Gemitaiz, Eros Ramazzotti, Tiromancino, Annalisa, and Neffa.

On 8 April 2025, he announced the title and tracklist of his upcoming his sixth album, Ragazzo di giù, which was released on 25 April 2025.

== Discography ==
=== Albums ===
Title	Details	Peak position	Certification
Title	Details	ITA	Certification
Poeta urbano	Released: 25 June 2013; Label: Sony Music; Formats: CD, digital download	5	
'A verità	Released: 25 March 2014; Label: Sony Music; Formats: CD, digital download	1	FIMI: Platinum
SignorHunt	Released: 23 October 2015; Label: Sony Music; Formats: CD, digital download	2	FIMI: Gold
Libertà	Released: 30 August 2019; Label: RCA; Formats: CD, digital download	1	FIMI: 2× Platinum
Rivoluzione	Released: 5 November 2021; Label: Epic; Formats: CD, digital download	1	FIMI: 2× Platinum
Ragazzo di giù	Released: 25 April 2025; Label: Epic; Formats: CD, digital download	2	
The Album (with Clementino)	Released: 6 November 2026; Label: Epic; Formats: CD, digital download	3	

=== Mixtapes ===
Title	Details
Spiraglio di periferia	Released: 2011; Label: Honiro; Format: Digital download

=== Extended play ===
Title	Details
A' music è speranz	Released: 2010; Label: Dint; Format: CD, digital download

=== Singles ===
List of singles as lead artist, with selected chart positions, showing year released and album name
Title	Year	Peak chart positions				Certifications	Album
Title	Year	ITA	LTU Air.	SWI	SPA	Certifications	Album
"Io posso"	2013	—	*	—	—		Poeta urbano
"Fammi vivere"	2013	—	*	—	—		Poeta urbano
"L'ammore overo"	2013	—	*	—	—		Poeta urbano
"Nu juorno buono"	2014	5	*	—	—	FIMI: Platinum	'A verità
"Vieni con me"	2014	56	*	—	—	FIMI: Gold	'A verità
"Ho scelto me"	2014	—	*	—	—	FIMI: Gold	'A verità 2.0
"Vene e vvà"	2015	63	*	—	—	FIMI: Gold	SignorHunt
"Se mi chiami" (featuring Neffa)	2015	69	*	—	—	FIMI: Platinum	SignorHunt
"Wake Up"	2016	11	—	—	—	FIMI: Gold	SignorHunt – Wake Up Edition
"Sto bene così"	2016	—	—	—	—		SignorHunt – Wake Up Edition
"Stella cadente" (featuring Annalisa)	2016	—	—	—	—	FIMI: Gold	SignorHunt – Wake Up Edition
"Kevvuo'"	2017	—	—	—	—		/
"Niente da bere"	2017	—	—	—	—		/
"Invece no"	2017	—	—	—	—		/
"Arrivano i prof"	2018	—	—	—	—		/
"Fammi scendere"	2018	—	—	—	—		/
"Tutte 'e parole"	2018	—	—	—	—		/
"Ngopp' a luna" (featuring Nicola Siciliano)	2019	44	—	—	—	FIMI: Gold	Libertà
"Cuore rotto" (featuring Gemitaiz)	2019	97	—	—	—		Libertà
"Benvenuti in Italy"	2019	—	—	—	—	FIMI: Gold	Libertà
"Ti volevo dedicare" (featuring J-Ax and Boomdabash)	2019	2	—	—	—	FIMI: 5× Platinum	Libertà
"Se tornerai" (featuring Neffa)	2019	64	—	—	—	FIMI: Gold	Libertà
"Stu core t'apparten"	2020	4	—	—	—	FIMI: Platinum	Libertà Repack
"Sultant' a mia"	2020	41	—	—	—		Rivoluzione
"A un passo dalla luna / A un paso de la luna" (featuring Ana Mena)	2020	1	—	31	4	FIMI: 6× Platinum; PROMUSICAE: 6× Platinum	Rivoluzione
"Che me chiamme a fa?" (featuring Geolier)	2021	8	—	—	—	FIMI: Gold	Rivoluzione
"Un bacio all'improvviso / Un beso de improviso" (featuring Ana Mena)	2021	4	—	—	55	FIMI: 4× Platinum; PROMUSICAE: 2× Platinum	Rivoluzione
"Fantastica" (featuring Boomdabash)	2021	48	—	—	—	FIMI: Gold	Rivoluzione
"Caramello" (featuring Elettra Lamborghini and Lola Indigo)	2022	3	—	—	—	FIMI: 4× Platinum	Rivoluzione
"A' vita senz' e te (Me fa paura)"	2022	67	—	—	—	FIMI: Gold	Rivoluzione
"Non litighiamo più"	2023	11	—	—	—	FIMI: 3× Platinum	Non-album singles
"Musica italiana"	2024	63	—	—	—	FIMI: Gold	Non-album singles
"Mille vote ancora"	2025	24	—	—	—	FIMI: Gold	Ragazzo di giù
"Oh ma" (with Noemi)	2025	21	—	—	—		Ragazzo di giù
"La più bella del mondo"	2026	—	99	—	—		Non-album single
"—" denotes a recording that did not chart or was not released in that territory. "*" denotes that the chart did not exist at that time.

=== Featured in ===
Title	Year	Album
"Giungla" (Clementino feat. Rocco Hunt)	2014	Mea culpa (Clementino)
"Seven" (Caneda feat. Fedez, J-Ax, Gemitaiz, Rocco Hunt, Baby K e Emis Killa)	2015	
"Candela" (NIA feat. Rocco Hunt and Lennis Rodriguez)	2022	

=== Other songs ===
Title	Year	Peak position		Certification	Album
Title	Year	ITA	FRA	Certification	Album
"Tutto resta"	2014	94	—		'A verità
"The Show"	2014	57	—		'A verità
"Nisciun'" (feat. Geolier)	2019	24	—	ITA: Platinum	Libertà
"Buonanotte amò"	2019	53	—	ITA: Gold	Libertà
"Mai più" (feat. Achille Lauro)	2019	77	—		Libertà
"A un paso de la luna (remix)" (feat. Reik and Ana Mena)	2021	—	11		
