= Tra le mani un cuore =

Single by Massimo Ranieri

from the album Tra le mani… le mie canzoni
- Language: Italian
- Released: 12 February 2025
- Genre: Pop
- Length: 3:15
- Label: Warner; Sugar Music; Nar International
- Songwriters: Tiziano Ferro; Filippo Neviani; Giulia Anania; Marta Venturini
- Producer: Lucio Fabbri

Massimo Ranieri singles chronology
"Lasciami dove ti pare" (2022)	"Tra le mani un cuore" (2025)

Music video
- "Tra le mani un cuore" on YouTube

"Tra le mani un cuore" ("A heart in my hands") is a 2025 song by Italian singer Massimo Ranieri, released by Warner, Sugar Music and Nar International on 12 February 2025. It competed in the Sanremo Music Festival 2025, placing 23rd.

The song was written by Tiziano Ferro with Filippo Neviani, Giulia Anania, and Marta Venturini.

== Music video ==
A music video of "Tra le mani un cuore", directed by Marco Pavone, was released on 26 February 2025 via Narinternational's YouTube channel.

== Charts ==
Chart performance for "Tra le mani un cuore"
Chart (2025)	Peak position
Italy (FIMI)	44
Italy Airplay (EarOne)	67
