= Simone Cristicchi =

Italian singer-songwriter and composer

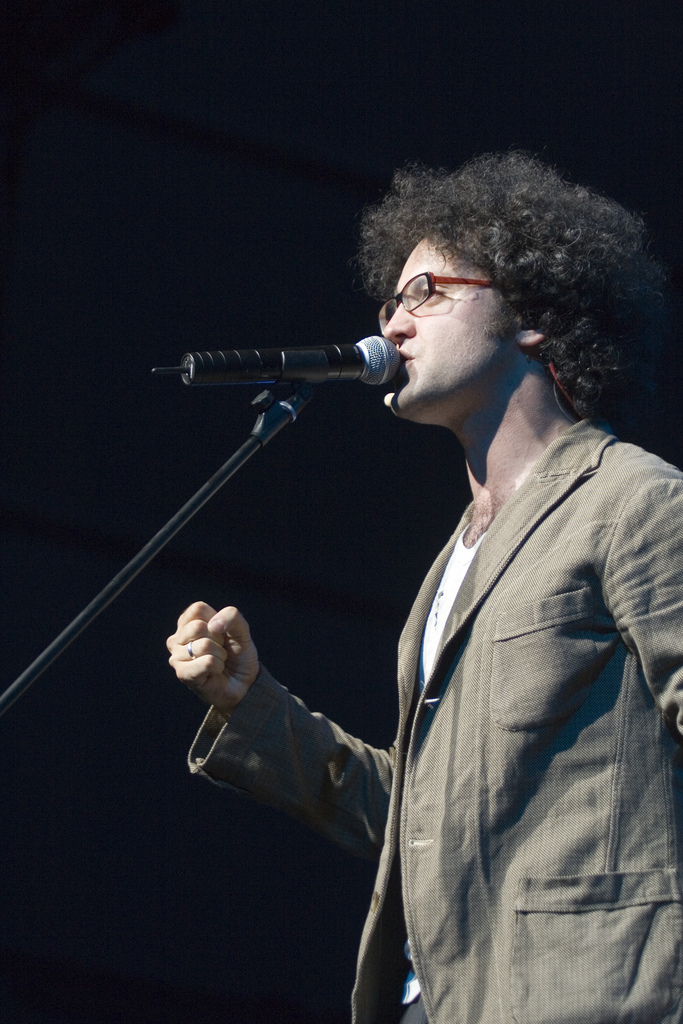
- Cristicchi in concert in 2007

Background information
- Born: 5 February 1977 (age 49); Rome, Italy
- Genres: Traditional pop; ska
- Occupations: Singer-songwriter; actor; composer

Simone Cristicchi (Italian: [siˈmoːne krisˈtikki]; born 5 February 1977) is an Italian singer-songwriter and composer.

== Biography ==
Cristicchi won the 57th edition of the Sanremo Music Festival in 2007 and also the Mia Martini critics award. His song "Ti regalerò una rosa" won due to extremely high marks received from the festival juries (96/100) and popular vote. The lyrics to the song are taken from papers he found that were written by a man who was in a mental hospital for most of his life. It is a sad tale of the man's struggle with being away from the woman he loves and being exiled for being mentally ill. The song has so far reached number 3 on the official Italian charts and number 1 on the official downloads chart going to become Cristicchi's most successful song to date in the country.

Cristicchi participated again at the Sanremo Music Festival in 2019, at its 69th edition, with the song "Abbi cura di me", and scored fifth place. In December 2024, he was announced as one of the participants in the Sanremo Music Festival 2025. He placed fifth with the song "Quando sarai piccola".

== Discography ==
=== Studio albums ===
- Fabbricante di canzoni (2006)
- Dall'altra parte del cancello (2007)
- Grand Hotel Cristicchi (2010)
- Album di famiglia (2013)
- Dalle tenebre alla luce (2024)

=== Singles ===
Song	Chart	Peak position
"Vorrei cantare come Biagio"	Italy	25
"Studentessa universitaria"	Italy	27
"Ti regalerò una rosa"	Italy	3
"Ti regalerò una rosa"	Italy Downloads	1
"Quando sarai piccola"	Italy	16
