= Viva la vita =

Single by Francesco Gabbani

from the album Dalla tua parte
- Language: Italian
- Released: 12 February 2025
- Genre: Pop; power ballad
- Length: 3:38
- Label: 432, BMG
- Songwriters: Francesco Gabbani; Carlo Gabelloni; Pacifico; Davide Simonetta; Andrea Vittori; Giuseppe Zito

Francesco Gabbani singles chronology
"Vengo a fidarmi di te" (2025)	"Viva la vita" (2025)	"Così come mi viene" (2025)

Music video
- "Viva la vita" on YouTube

"Viva la vita" is a 2025 song by Italian singer Francesco Gabbani, released on 12 February 2025 by 432 and BMG. It competed in the Sanremo Music Festival 2025, where it placed 8th.

== Music video ==
A music video of "Viva la vita", directed by Filiberto Signorello, was released on 12 February 2025 via Gabbani's YouTube channel.

== Charts ==
Chart performance for "Viva la vita"
Chart (2025)	Peak position
Italy (FIMI)	30
Italy Airplay (EarOne)	22
