= Modà =

Italian indie rock band

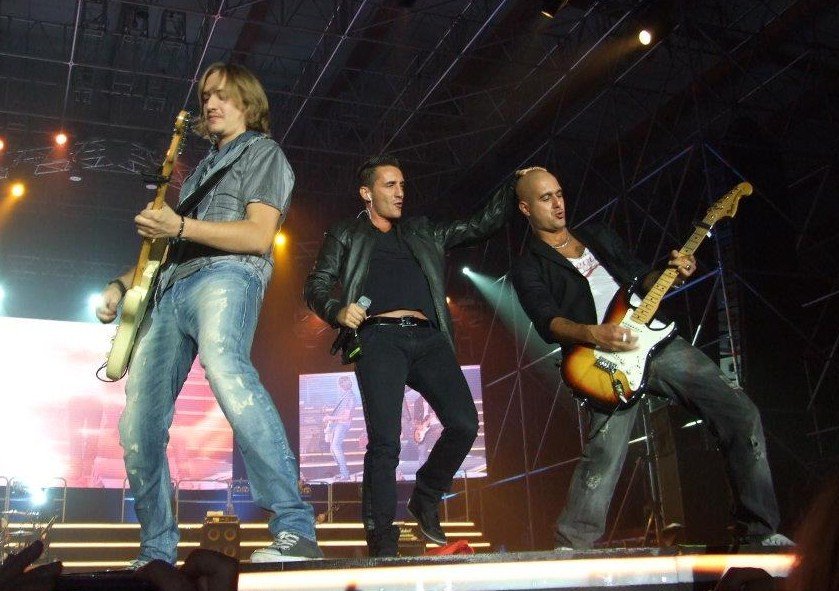
- Modà in concert in 2011

Background information
- Origin: Milan, Italy
- Genres: Rock; pop rock
- Years active: 2002–present
- Labels: New Music, Around the Music, Ultrasuoni
- Members: Francesco Silvestre; Diego Arrigoni; Enrico Zapparoli; Stefano Forcella; Claudio Dirani
- Past members: Manuel Signoretto; Matteo "Tino" Alberti; Paolo Bovi
- Website: www.rockmoda.com

Modà is an Italian rock band from Milan. Formed in 2002, the band currently consists of lead singer Kekko Silvestre, guitarists Diego Arrigoni and Enrico Zapparoli, bass guitarist Stefano Forcella and drummer Claudio Dirani.

== History ==
=== 2000–2003: early years ===
In the early 2000s, Kekko Silvestre met musicians Tino Alberti and Enrico Palmosi. Later joined by Silvestre's childhood friend Paolo Bovi, they formed a band, Pop Doc, which performed in local clubs in Northern Italy. Silvestre later decided to rename the band after a discothèque in Erba, Lombardy. In 2001, Modà recorded their first demos, but during the summer of the same year, Palmosi left the group, later becoming the arranger of most of Modà's songs.

The following year, Silvestre met Diego Arrigoni, who became the band's guitarist. Shortly after, Stefano Forcella and Manuel Signoretto became Modà's bass guitarist and drummer, respectively.

=== 2003–2005: debut album and Sanremo Music Festival ===
In May 2003, Modà released their first self-produced EP, titled Via d'uscita. During one of their concerts, Modà were noted by Marco Sfratato, who was interested in their music and introduced the band to Pippo Landro, director of the independent record label New Music International. That way, Modà obtained their first recording contract. The band's debut album was released in October of the following year. Titled Ti amo veramente, the album was preceded by the single with the same title, which became a minor hit in Italy. The album also spawned the singles "Dimmi che non hai paura", released on 10 September 2004, and "Nuvole di rock".

In March 2005, the band participated in the Newcomers' Section of the 55th Sanremo Music Festival, performing their entry "Riesci a innamorarmi". Paolo Bovi later revealed that they initially submitted the song "Mia", but they had to change it at the last time because it was already known among Modà's friends and fans, while the rules of the competition require competing song to be completely unknown to the audience. "Riesci a innamorarmi" was eliminated during the first stage of the competition. Included in a new edition of Modà's debut album, the song peaked at number 41 on the Italian Singles Chart.

=== 2006–2009: the Around the Music-era ===
During the Sanremo Music Festival 2005, problems in the relationship with their recording label started to arise, later leading the band to leave New Music and to sign a new contract with the independent label Around the Music.

In 2006, Paolo Bovi left the band. Shortly after, Modà released the single "Quello che non ti ho detto", a pop ballad which peaked at number 4 on the Italian Singles Chart, spending 16 non-consecutive weeks within the top 20. The song is the lead single from the album with the same title, released on 29 September 2006. After entering the Italian chart at number 14, the album also spawned the singles "Malinconico a metà" and "Grazie gente".

In 2007, Matteo "Tino" Alberti and Manuel Signoretti left the band and were replaced by Enrico Zapparoli and Claudio Dirani, respectively. With the new lineup, Modà started recording their third studio album, Sala d'attesa, which was released in 2008.

=== 2010–2012: Viva i romantici ===
In 2010, after signing with the record label Ultrasuoni, controlled by three of the most important Italian radio networks, the band released the single "Sono già solo", which became a sleeper hit, peaking at number two on the Italian Singles Chart during its 28th week and later being certified multi-platinum by the Federation of the Italian Music Industry. In October of the same year, the following single "La notte" achieved a similar success in Italy.

In February 2011, the band participated in the 61st Sanremo Music Festival, placing second in the Big Artists Section with their entry "Arriverà", a duet with Italian singer Emma. The song was included in Modà's fourth studio album, released during the same days. Titled Viva i romantici, it debuted at number one on the Italian Albums Chart, holding the top spot for a total amount of six consecutive weeks. The album was later certified diamond by the Federation of the Italian Music Industry and, as of May 2012, it had sold more than 400,000 copies in Italy.

On 16 November the single La Gelosia featuring Bianca Atzei was released.

=== 2013–2014: Gioia ===
In 2013, the band participated in the 63rd Sanremo Music Festival, placing third in the Big Artists Section with their entry "Se si potesse non morire". The song was included in Modà's fifth studio album. Titled "Gioia", it debuted at number one on the Italian Albums Chart, holding the top spot for a total amount of two consecutive weeks. The album was later certified quadruple platinum by the Federation of the Italian Music Industry. It had sold more than 250,000 copies in Italy. In 2014, the Italian band presents its "Europe & US Tour". Modà played in Spain, Germany (Sold out), Switzerland (Sold out), France (Sold out), Belgium (Sold out), United Kingdom (Sold out) and in New York (Sold out). The same year, the band played for the first time in the two largest stadiums in Italy: San Siro (Sold out) and Stadio Olimpico

=== 2015–2017: Passione Maledetta ===
In 2015, the band published its sixth studio album titled "Passione Maledetta". It debuted at number one on the Italian Album Chart and was certified quadruple platinum by the Federation of the Italian Music Industry. It had sold more than 200,000 copies in Italy. In 2016 the band played again in San Siro two consecutive times

=== 2019–2020: Testa o croce ===
In 2019, after signing with Warner Chappell Music, Believe and Friends&Partners, the band published its seventh studio album titled "Testa o croce". It debuted at number two on the Italian album Chart and was certified gold. It had sold more than 25,000 copies in Italy

In 2020, Modà released Testa o Croce 2020 Edition, a new version of their previous album with new 4 songs

=== 2021–present: Buona Fortuna – Parte Prima and 8 canzoni ===
In 2021, the band published its eighth studio album titled Buona Fortuna – Parte Prima. It debuted at number seven on the Italian album Chart.

On 4 December 2022, their participation in the Sanremo Music Festival 2023 was announced; they competed with the entry "Lasciami". In December 2024, they were announced among the participants in the Sanremo Music Festival 2025. They placed 22nd with the song "Non ti dimentico".

== Band members ==
Current members

- Francesco "Kekko" Silvestre – lead vocals (2002–present)
- Diego Arrigoni – electric guitar (2002–present)
- Enrico Zapparoli – guitar (2007–present)
- Stefano Forcella – bass guitar (2002–present)
- Claudio Dirani – drums (2007–present)

Former members

- Manuel Signoretto – drum (2002–2007)
- Matteo "Tino" Alberti – bass guitar (2002–2007)
- Paolo Bovi – keyboards (2002–2006)

== Discography ==
=== Studio albums ===
List of albums, with chart positions, sales, and certifications
Title	Album details	Peak chart positions		Sales	Certifications
Title	Album details	ITA	BEL (WA)	Sales	Certifications
Ti amo veramente	Released: 15 October 2004; Label: New Music; Formats: CD	28	—		FIMI: Gold
Quello che non ti ho detto	Released: 29 September 2006; Label: Around the Music; Formats: CD, download	14	—		
Sala d'attesa	Released: 23 May 2008; Label: Around the Music; Formats: CD, download	19	—		FIMI: Gold
Viva i romantici	Released: 16 February 2011; Label: Ultrasuoni; Formats: CD, download	1	—	ITA: 400,000	FIMI: Diamond
Gioia	Released: 14 February 2013; Label: Ultrasuoni; Formats: CD, download	1	118		FIMI: 4× Platinum
Passione Maledetta	Released: 17 November 2015; Label: Ultrasuoni; Formats: CD, 2CD + 2DVD, download	1	—		
Testa o croce	Released: 4 October 2019	2	—		FIMI: Gold
Buona fortuna – Parte prima	Released: 12 November 2021	7	—		
Buona fortuna – Parte seconda	Released: 22 April 2022	11	—		
Buona fortuna – Parte terza	Released: 11 November 2022	8	—		
8 canzoni	Released: 14 February 2025	7			

=== Compilation albums ===
List of albums, with chart positions and certifications
Title	Album details	Peak chart positions	Certifications
Title	Album details	ITA	Certifications
Le origini	Released: 26 October 2010; Label: New Music; Formats: CD, download	13	FIMI: Gold
Best - I primi grandi successi	Released: 27 May 2014; Label: Sony; Formats: CD, download	26	

=== Live albums ===
List of albums, with chart positions and certifications
Title	Album details	Peak chart positions	Certifications
Title	Album details	ITA	Certifications
2004-2014 - L'originale	Released: 11 November 2014; Label: Ultrasuoni; Formats: 2× CD, 2× CD+2× DVD, download	3	FIMI: 4× Platinum

=== Singles ===
List of singles, with chart positions and certifications in Italy
Single	Year	Peak chart positions	Certifications	Album
Single	Year	ITA	Certifications	Album
"Ti amo veramente"	2004	36		Ti amo veramente
"Dimmi che non hai paura"	2004	—		Ti amo veramente
"Nuvole di rock"	2004	—		Ti amo veramente
"Riesci a innamorarmi"	2005	41		Ti amo veramente
"Quello che non ti ho detto (scusami)"	2006	4	FIMI: Gold	Quello che non ti ho detto
"Malinconico a metà"	2006	—		Quello che non ti ho detto
"Grazie gente"	2007	—		Quello che non ti ho detto
"Sarò sincero"	2008	—		Sala d'attesa
"Meschina"	2008	—		Sala d'attesa
"Timida"	2009	—		Viva i romantici
"Sono già solo"	2010	2	FIMI: 2× Platinum	Viva i romantici
"La notte"	2010	2	FIMI: 2× Platinum	Viva i romantici
"Arriverà" (feat. Emma)	2011	1	FIMI: 2× Platinum	Viva i romantici
"Vittima"	2011	—	FIMI: Gold	Viva i romantici
"Salvami"	2011	—	FIMI: Gold	Viva i romantici
"Tappeto di fragole"	2011	7	FIMI: 2× Platinum	Viva i romantici
"Come un pittore" (feat. Jarabe de Palo)	2012	2	FIMI: 3× Platinum	Viva i romantici
"Se si potesse non morire"	2013	2	FIMI: Platinum	Gioia
"Gioia"	2013	—	FIMI: Gold	Gioia
"Dimmelo"	2013	—		Gioia
"Non è mai abbastanza"	2013	—	FIMI: Gold	Gioia
"La sua bellezza"	2014	—		Gioia
"Dove è sempre sole" (feat. Pau Donés from Jarade de Palo)	2014	19	FIMI: Gold	Gioia
"Cuore e vento" (feat. Tazenda)	2014	—		Gioia
"Lasciami"	2023	31		Non-album singles
"Il foglietto col tuo nome"	2024	—		8 canzoni
"Non ti dimentico"	2025	29	FIMI: Gold	8 canzoni

=== Featured singles ===
List of featured singles
Single	Year	Album
"La gelosia" (Bianca Atzei feat. Modà)	2012	Non-album single

== Awards and nominations ==
Year	Award	Nomination	Work	Result
2010	Venice Music Awards	RTL 102.5 Award	Modà	Won
2010	Wind Music Awards	Revelation of the Year	Modà	Won
2011	TRL Awards	Best New Act	Modà	Won
2011	TRL Awards	Italians Do It Better	Modà	Won
2011	MTV Europe Music Awards	Best Italian Act	Modà	Won
2011	MTV Europe Music Awards	Best European Act	Modà	Nominated
2011	Lunezia Award	Pop-rock Award	Viva i romantici	Won
2012	TRL Awards	Best Band	Modà	Won
2013	Nastro d'Argento	Best Original Song	"Se si potesse non morire"	Nominated
