= Jacopo Ettorre =

Italian lyricist and composer (born 1990)

- Born: 28 January 1990 (age 36); Forlì, Italy
- Occupations: Singer; songwriter; lyricist; composer

Jacopo Ettorre (born in 1990), also known as Jacopo Èt, is an Italian lyricist, composer and singer-songwriter.

== Life and career ==
Born in Forlì into a family of musicians, at young age Ettore studied classical music. In 2015, he wrote his first hit, "Lunedì", for the duo Benji & Fede. In 2019, he made his debut at the Sanremo Music Festival with the song "Senza farlo apposta", performed by Shade and Federica Carta.

In 2021, Ettore made his recording debut as "Jacopo Èt" with the album Siamo sicuri di essere giovani?, which features Jake La Furia and Lo Stato Sociale as guests. In 2025, he released his second album, Sammy, Cabiria, etc. etc.

Ettore's songwriting collaborations include Mahmood, Laura Pausini, Elodie, Annalisa, Fedez, Giusy Ferreri, Emma Marrone, Alessandra Amoroso, Max Pezzali, Paola & Chiara, Baby K, Ghali, Boomdabash, Rkomi, Coma_Cose, Emis Killa, Madame, Gaia, Clara, Fred De Palma, Sarah Toscano. He has named the singer-songwriters Lucio Battisti, Vasco Rossi, and Rino Gaetano as his principal inspirations.

== Discography ==
=== Album ===
- Siamo sicuri di essere giovani? (2021)
- Sammy, Cabiria, etc. etc. (2025)

== Songwriting credits ==
List of songs written or co-written by Jacopo Ettorre and performed by other artists
Title	Year	Artist	Album
"Lunedì" (Written by Federico Rossi, Benjamin Mascolo, Jacopo Ettorre and Luca Valsiglio)	2015	Benji & Fede	20:05
"Lettera" (Written by Jacopo Ettorre and Luca Valsiglio)	2015	Benji & Fede	20:05
"Forme geometriche" (Written by Jacopo Ettorre, Magnus Bertelsen and Luca Valsiglio)	2016	Benji & Fede	0+
"È finita l'estate" (Written by Jacopo Ettorre, Luca Valsiglio and Fabrizio Ferraguzzo)	2016	Giusy Ferreri	Girotondo
"Dimenticherai" (Written by Michele Canova, Alma-Sofia Miettinen and Jacopo Ettorre)	2018	Annalisa	Bye Bye
"Amore a prima insta" (Written by Vito Ventura, Jacopo Ettorre and Giacomo Roggia)	2018	Shade	Truman
"Senza farlo apposta" (Written by Vito Ventura, Jacopo Ettorre and Giacomo Roggia)	2019	Shade and Federica Carta	Truman (Sanremo Edition)
"Amnesia" (Written by Federico Lucia, Jacopo Ettorre and Simone Privitera)	2019	Fedez	Paranoia Airlines
"Sex on the Beach" (Written by Umberto Violo, Nicolò Rapisarda, Dylan Thomas Cerulli, Jacopo Ettorre, Federico Mercuri and Giordano Cremona)	2019	Dark Polo Gang	Trap Lovers - Reloaded
"La somma" (Written by Mattia Balardi, Jacopo Ettorre, Shari Noioso and Marco Rissa)	2019	Mr. Rain feat. Martina Attili	Non-album single
"Dove e quando" (Written by Federico Rossi, Benjamin Mascolo, Jacopo Ettorre, Eugenio Maimone, Federico Mercuri, Giordano Cremona)	2019	Benji & Fede	Good Vibes
"Fuerte" (Written by Jacopo Ettorre and Riccardo Scirè)	2019	Elettra Lamborghini	Twerking Queen
"6 del mattino" (Written by Francesco Vigorelli, Jacopo Ettorre, Massimiliano Dagani and Mario Fracchiola)	2019	Jake La Furia feat. Brancar	Non album single
"Tu che ne sai" (Written by Diego Caterbetti, Daniele Sodano, Jacopo Ettorre and Massimiliano Dagani)	2019	Naska feat. Zoda	Alo/Ve
"Come fa?" (Written by Clemente Maccaro, Pierfrancesco Botrugno, Jacopo Ettorre and Stefano Tognini)	2019	Clementino feat. MadMan	Non-album single
"Tutta d'un fiato (fino al fischio finale)" (Written by Cristina D'Avena, Jacopo Ettorre, Federico Mercuri and Giordano Cremona)	2020	Cristina D'Avena	Nel cuore solo il calcio
"No grazie" (Written by Antonio Signore, Jacopo Ettorre, Leonardo Grillotti, Eugenio Maimone, Federico Mercuri and Giordano Cremona)	2020	Junior Cally	Ricercato? No grazie
"Mondo sommerso" (Written by Giulio Elia Sabatello, Jacopo Ettorre and Matteo Lo Valvo)	2020	Lowlow feat. Holden	Dogma 93
"Densa" (Written by Gaia Gozzi, Jacopo Ettorre and Simone Privitera)	2020	Gaia	Genesi
"Il rosso delle rose" (Written by Gaia Gozzi, Jacopo Ettorre, Giorgio Spedicato and Simone Privitera)	2020	Gaia	Nuova Genesi
"Houseparty" (Written by Annalisa Scarrone, Jacopo Ettorre, Davide Simonetta and Michele Canova)	2020	Annalisa	Nuda
"D'oro" (Written by Annalisa Scarrone, Jacopo Ettorre, Patrizio Simonini and Michele Canova)	2020	Annalisa	Nuda
"Bella così" (Written by Chadia Rodríguez, Jacopo Ettorre, Mario Gianclaudio and Massimiliano Dagani)	2020	Chadia Rodríguez feat. Federica Carta	Non-album single
"Sangria" (Written by Emma Muscat, Fabio Pizzoli, Jacopo Ettorre, Pasquale Giannetti and Vincenzo Colella)	2020	Emma Muscat	Non-album single
"Qualcosa di nuovo" (Written by Max Pezzali, Jacopo Ettorre and Michele Canova)	2020	Max Pezzali	Qualcosa di nuovo
"Sesso droga e lavorare" (Written by Lodovico Guenzi, Alberto Cazzola, Alberto Guidetti, Francesco Draicchio, Enrico Roberto, Matteo Romagnoli, Jacopo Ettorre, Ramiro Levy and Daniel Plentz)	2021	Lo Stato Sociale	Attentato alla musica italiana
"Combat pop" (Written by Lodovico Guenzi, Alberto Cazzola, Francesco Draicchio, Alberto Guidetti, Enrico Roberto and Jacopo Ettorre)	2021	Lo Stato Sociale	Attentato alla musica italiana
"Cuore amaro" (Written by Gaia Gozzi, Jacopo Ettorre, Daniele Dezi and Giorgio Spedicato)	2021	Gaia	Gaia
"Movimento lento" (Written by Annalisa Scarrone, Jacopo Ettorre, Leonardo Grillotti, Eugenio Maimone, Federico Mercuri and Giordano Cremona)	2021	Annalisa feat. Federico Rossi	Nuda10
"Luna" (Written by Francesca Calearo, Gaia Gozzi, Jacopo Ettorre, Matteo Novi, Stefano Tognini)	2021	Madame feat. Gaia	Madame
"Meglio di sera" (Written by Álvaro De Luna, Fabio Pizzoli, Jacopo Ettorre, Pasquale Giannetti, Vincenzo Colella, Eugenio Maimone, Federico Mercuri and Giordano Cremona)	2021	Emma Muscat	Non-album single
"Non è mai troppo tardi" (Written by Federico Rossi, Jacopo Ettorre, Eugenio Maimone, Leonardo Grillotti, Federico Mercuri and Giordano Cremona)	2021	Federico Rossi	Non-album single
"Non dire una parola" (Written by Claudia Nahum, Jacopo Ettorre and Stefano Tognini)	2021	Baby K and Álvaro Soler	Donna sulla Luna
"Pomeriggio" (Written by Gaia Gozzi, Jacopo Ettorre and Simone Privitera)	2021	Gaia	Alma
"Mosaici" (Written by Carlo Coraggio, Gaia Gozzi, Jacopo Ettorre and Luca Antonio Barker)	2022	Sick Luke feat. Gaia and Carl Brave	X2
"Astronauti" (Written by Margherita Vicario and Jacopo Ettorre)	2022	Margherita Vicario	Non-album single
"Au revoir" (Written by Federico Palana, Rosa Luini, Cosimo Fini, Jacopo Ettorre and Julien Boverod)	2022	Fred De Palma feat. Rose Villain and Guè	PLC Tape 1
"Bandana" (Written by Luca D'Alessio, Benjamin Mascolo, Jacopo Ettorre and Stefano Tognini)	2022	LDA	LDA
"Pare" (Written by Ghali Amdouni, Francesca Calearo, Jacopo Ettorre, Eugenio Maimone, Federico Mercuri and Giordano Cremona)	2022	Ghali feat. Madame	Sensazione ultra
"Scandalosa" (Written by Myss Keta, Dario Pigato, Jacopo Ettorre, Stefano Riva and Stefano Tognini)	2022	Myss Keta	Club Topperia
"Tribale" (Written by Elodie Di Patrizi, Federica Abbate, Jacopo Ettorre, Eugenio Maimone, Leonardo Grillotti, Federico Mercuri and Giordano Cremona)	2022	Elodie	OK. Respira
"Tropicana" (Written by Federica Abbate, Jacopo Ettorre, Alessandro Merli and Fabio Clemente)	2022	Boomdabash and Annalisa	Venduti
"L'amore e la violenza" (Written by Francesco Vigorelli, Vincenzo Mattera, Jacopo Ettorre, Otmen Belhouari, Pietro Miani and Federico Vaccari)	2022	Jake La Furia feat. Paky	Ferro del mestiere
"Senza niente da dire" (Written by Francesco Vigorelli, Ana Mena, Jacopo Ettorre, Eugenio Maimone, Federico Mercuri and Giordano Cremona)	2022	Jake La Furia feat. Ana Mena	Ferro del mestiere
"Caramelle da uno sconosciuto" (Written by Francesco Vigorelli, Jacopo Ettorre and Matteo Bernacchi)	2022	Jake La Furia	Ferro del mestiere
"La cosa giusta" (Written by Francesco Vigorelli, Fabiano Ballarin, Jacopo Ettorre and Simone Benussi)	2022	Jake La Furia feat. Inoki	Ferro del mestiere
"I soldi e la droga" (Written by Francesco Vigorelli, Jacopo Lazzarini, Jacopo Ettorre and Massimiliano Dagani)	2022	Jake La Furia feat. Lazza	Ferro del mestiere
"Così non va" (Written by the members of Bnkr44, Elisa Toffoli, Mirko Martorana, Francesca Calearo, Gaia Gozzi, Jacopo Ettorre and Luca Pace)	2022	The Night Skinny feat. Bnkr44, Elisa, Gaia, Rkomi and Madame	Botox
"OK. Respira" (Written by Elodie Di Patrizi, Alessandra Joan Thiele, Federica Abbate, Jacopo Ettorre, Eugenio Maimone, Federico Mercuri and Giordano Cremona)	2022	Elodie	OK. Respira
"Bolero" (Written by Claudia Nahum, Michael Holbrook Penninman, Jacopo Ettorre and Filippo Uttinacci)	2022	Baby K feat. Mika	Donna sulla Luna
"Heaven" (Written by Gianfranco Randone, Maurizio Lobina, Jacopo Ettorre, Alessandro Merli and Fabio Clemente)	2022	Boomdabash and Eiffel 65	Venduti
"Due" (Written by Elodie Di Patrizi, Federica Abbate, Jacopo Ettorre, Dario Faini and Francesco Catitti)	2023	Elodie	OK. Respira
"Danse la vie" (Written by Elodie Di Patrizi, Jacopo Ettorre, Federica Abbate and Dario Faini)	2023	Elodie	OK. Respira
"Furore" (Written by Paola Iezzi, Chiara Iezzi, Jacopo Ettorre, Alessandro La Cava, Federico Mercuri and Giordano Cremona)	2023	Paola & Chiara	Per sempre
"Si o no" (Written by Francesco Vigorelli and Jacopo Ettorre)	2023	Giorgia	Blu
"Ogni chance che hai" (Written by Giorgia Todrani, Davide De Luca, Jacopo Ettorre and Giovanni Cassano)	2023	Giorgia feat. Gemitaiz	Blu
"Claudia" (Written by Francesca Michielin, Federica Abbate and Jacopo Ettorre)	2023	Francesca Michielin	Cani sciolti
"Mezzo mondo" (Written by Emma Marrone, Francesco Tarducci, Jacopo Ettorre and Francesco Catitti)	2023	Emma	Souvenir
"Ave Maria" (Written by Margherita Vicario, Jacopo Ettorre and Davide Pavanello)	2023	Margherita Vicario	Showtime
"Mare caos" (Written by Paola Iezzi, Chiara Iezzi, Jacopo Ettorre, Federica Abbate, Eugenio Maimone, Leonardo Grillotti, Federico Mercuri and Giordano Cremona)	2023	Paola & Chiara	Per sempre
"Volgare" (Written by Mario Molinari, Jacopo Lazzarini, Jacopo Ettorre, Alex Vella and Luca Ghiazzi)	2023	Tedua feat. Lazza	La Divina Commedia
"La discoteca italiana" (Written by Fabio Rovazzi, Jacopo Ettorre and Gabry Ponte)	2023	Fabio Rovazzi feat. Orietta Berti	Greatest Hits
"Lambada" (Written by Jacopo Ettorre, Federica Abbate, Alessandro Merli and Fabio Clemente)	2023	Boomdabash and Paola & Chiara	Venduti
"Poi si vedrà" (Written by Raphael Gualazzi, Jacopo Ettorre and Giordano Colombo)	2023	Raphael Gualazzi	Dreams
"Glamour" (Written by Elodie Di Patrizi, Jacopo Ettorre and Simone Privitera)	2023	Elodie	Red Light
"Elle" (Written by Elodie Di Patrizi, Jacopo Ettorre and Simone Privitera)	2023	Elodie	Red Light
"Amore cane" (Written by Emma Marrone, Jacopo Lazzarini, Jacopo Ettorre and Simone Privitera)	2023	Emma feat. Lazza	Souvenir
"Sentimentale" (Written by Emma Marrone, Jacopo Ettorre and Simone Privitera)	2023	Emma	Souvenir
"Carne viva" (Written by Jacopo Ettorre and Riccardo Scirè)	2023	Emma	Souvenir
"Indaco" (Written by Emma Marrone, Federica Abbate, Jacopo Ettorre and Simone Privitera)	2023	Emma	Souvenir
"Canzoni per gli altri" (Written by Federica Abbate, Jacopo Ettorre, Mattia Cerri and Francesco Catitti)	2023	Federica Abbate feat. Elisa	Canzoni per gli altri
"Grandine" (Written by Federica Abbate, Jacopo Ettorre and Francesco Catitti)	2023	Federica Abbate feat. Alessandra Amoroso	Canzoni per gli altri
"Eppure non è così" (Written by Laura Pausini, Jacopo Ettorre and Paolo Carta)	2023	Laura Pausini	Anime parallele
"Flashback" (Written by Laura Pausini, Jacopo Ettorre and Paolo Carta)	2023	Laura Pausini	Anime parallele
"Hall of Fame" (Written by Ivan Arturo Barioli, Mattia Barbieri, Rosa Luini, Jacopo Ettorre and Federica Abbate)	2023	Artie 5ive and Rondodasosa feat. Rose Villain	Motivation 4 the Streetz
"King of the Jungle" (Written by Francesco Vigorelli, Cosimo Fini, Jacopo Ettorre, Federica Abbate and Luigi Florio)	2024	Club Dogo	Club Dogo
"Malafede" (Written by Francesco Vigorelli, Cosimo Fini, Jacopo Ettorre, Daniel Bevilacqua and Luigi Florio)	2024	Club Dogo	Club Dogo
"Spingere" (Written by Vieri Igor Traxler, Jacopo Ettorre, Eugenio Maimone, Leonardo Grillotti, Federico Mercuri and Giordano Cremona)	2024	Il Pagante feat. VillaBanks	FOMO
"Tuta gold" (Written by Alessandro Mahmoud, Jacopo Ettorre and Francesco Catitti)	2024	Mahmood	Nei letti degli altri
"Fino a qui" (Written by Alessandra Amoroso, Federica Abbate, Jacopo Ettorre, Alessandro Merli and Fabio Clemente)	2024	Alessandra Amoroso	Io non sarei
"Governo punk" (Written by Duccio Caponi, Andrea Locci, Pietro Serafini, Marco Vittiglio, Jacopo Ettorre, Dario Lombardi and Jacopo Adamo)	2024	Bnkr44	Tocca il cielo
"C'est la vie" (Written by Clara Soccini, Jacopo Ettorre, Luca Ghiazzi and Luca Di Blasi)	2024	Clara	Primo
"Il cielo non ci vuole" (Written by Federico Palana, Jacopo Ettorre and Julien Boverod)	2024	Fred De Palma	Non-album single
"Cento occhi" (Written by Marianna Mammone, Jacopo Ettorre, Eugenio Maimone, Leonardo Grillotti, Federico Mercuri and Giordano Cremona)	2024	BigMama	Sangue
"Filo spinato" (Written by Gianna Nannini, Jacopo Ettorre and Stefano Tognini)	2024	Gianna Nannini	Sei nel l'anima
"Discoteche abbandonate" (Written by Max Pezzali, Michele Canova and Jacopo Ettorre)	2024	Max Pezzali	Max Forever Vol.1
"Kill Bill" (Written by Mario Molinari, Jacopo Ettorre, Luca Di Blasi and Giorgio De Lauri)	2024	Tedua	La Divina Commedia: Paradiso
"Malavita" (Written by Fausto Zanardelli, Francesca Mesiano, Federica Abbate, Jacopo Ettorre, Eugenio Maimone, Leonardo Grillotti, Federico Mercuri and Giordano Cremona)	2024	Coma Cose	Vita fusa
"Femme fatale" (Written by Jacopo Ettorre, Simone Capurro and Julien Boverod)	2024	Emma	Souvenir: Extended
"Pretaporter" (Written by Emma Marrone, Jacopo Ettorre and Francesco Catitti)	2024	Emma	Souvenir: Extended
"French Riviera" (Written by Emma Marrone, Jacopo Ettorre, Luca Di Blasi and Giorgio Di Lauri)	2024	Emma	Souvenir: Extended
"Paprika" (Written by Ghali Amdouni, Jacopo Ettorre and Rida Amhaouch)	2024	Ghali	Non-album single
"Bestiale" (Written by Maurizio Lobina, Jacopo Ettorre, Piero Romitelli and Loredana Bertè)	2024	Eiffel 65 and Loredana Bertè	Non-album single
"Black Nirvana" (Written by Elodie Di Patrizi, Jacopo Ettorre, Federica Abbate, Eugenio Maimone, Federico Mercuri and Giordano Cremona)	2024	Elodie	Mi ami mi odi
"Love U/Hate U" (Written by Davide Petrella, Jacopo Ettorre, Alessandro Merli and Fabio Clemente)	2024	Boomdabash	Non-album single
"Ghetto Love" (Written by Matteo D'Alessio, Clara Soccini, Federica Abbate, Jacopo Ettorre and Stefano Tognini)	2024	Icy Subzero feat. Clara	Non-album single
"Ra ta ta" (Written by Alessandro Mahmoud, Jacopo Ettorre, Francesco Catitti and Emilio Barberini)	2024	Mahmood	Nei letti degli altri
"Fino all'alba" (Written by Luca D'Orso, Luca Faraone, Jacopo Ettorre, Alessandro Merli and Fabio Clemente)	2024	Capo Plaza	Ferite (Deluxe)
"Il linguaggio del corpo" (Written by Paola Iezzi, Chiara Iezzi, Marianna Mammone, Federica Abbate, Alessandro La Cava and Jacopo Ettorre)	2024	Paola & Chiara feat. BigMama	Non-album single
"Buio davanti" (Written by Jacopo Lazzarini and Jacopo Ettorre)	2024	Lazza	Locura
"Posti vuoti" (Written by Fausto Zanardelli, Francesca Mesiano, Jacopo Ettorre and Michele Zocca)	2024	Coma Cose	Vita fusa
"Feeling" (Written by Elodie Di Patrizi, Tiziano Ferro, Jacopo Ettorre, Federica Abbate and Pietro Paroletti)	2024	Elodie and Tiziano Ferro	Mi ami mi odi
"Il ritmo delle cose" (Written by Mirko Martorana, Gianluigi Fazio, Matteo Pierotti, Jacopo Ettorre, Luca Faraone and Pablo Miguel Lombroni Capalbo)	2025	Rkomi	Decrescendo
"Anema e core" (Written by Serena Brancale, Federica Abbate, Angelo Ettorre, Manuek Finotti and Nicola Lazzarin)	2025	Serena Brancale	TBA
"Febbre" (Written by Clara Soccini, Francesca Calearo, Jacopo Ettorre, Federica Abbate and Dario Faini)	2025	Clara	TBA
"Amarcord" (Written by Sarah Toscano, Jacopo Ettorre, Federica Abbate, Eugenio Maimone, Federico Mercuri and Giordano Cremona)	2025	Sarah Toscano	Met Gala
"Scacciapensieri" (Written by Federico Bertollini, Jacopo Ettorre and Pietro Paroletti)	2025	Franco126	Futuri possibili
"Due estranei" (Written by Federico Bertollini, Filippo Uttinacci, Jacopo Ettorre and Pietro Paroletti)	2025	Franco126 feat. Fulminacci	Futuri possibili
"Vampiro" (Written by Federico Bertollini, Pietro Baldini, Jacopo Ettorre and Pietro Paroletti)	2025	Franco126 feat. Ketama126	Futuri possibili
"La fine" (Written by Jacopo Ettorre, Antonio Di Martino and Francesco Catitti)	2025	Noemi	Nostalgia
"Mi ami mi odi" (Written by Elodie Di Patrizi, Elisa Toffoli, Jacopo Ettorre and Dario Faini)	2025	Elodie	Mi ami mi odi
"Muah" (Written by Elodie Di Patrizi, Valeria Palmitessa and Jacopo Ettorre)	2025	Elodie	Mi ami mi odi
"Una stupida scusa" (Written by Jacopo Ettorre, Alfredo Rapetti, Paolo Pagano, Pierfrancesco Pasini, Federica Abbate, Alessandro Merli and Fabio Clemente)	2025	Boomdabash and Loredana Bertè	Non-album single
"Chill" (Written by Ghali Amdouni, Jacopo Ettorre, Luca Faraone, Alessandro Merli and Fabio Clemente)	2025	Ghali	TBA
"Non c'è amore" (Written by Mirko Martorana, Jacopo Lazzarini, Jacopo Ettorre, Luca Faraone, Roberto Lamanna and Pablo Miguel Lombroni Capalbo)	2025	Rkomi feat. Lazza	Decrescendo
"10 secondi" (Written by Mirko Martorana, William Mezzanotte, Jacopo Ettorre, Luca Faraone and Pablo Miguel Lombroni Capalbo)	2025	Rkomi feat. Nayt	Decrescendo
"Mr. Nobody" (Written by Silvano Albanese, Jacopo Ettorre and Giorgio Pesenti)	2025	Coez	1998
"Senza di te" (Written by Silvano Albanese, Jacopo Ettorre, Giorgio Pesenti and Daniele Capoferri)	2025	Coez	1998
"Io non sarei" (Written by Alessandra Amoroso, Jacopo Ettorre, Alessandro La Cava and Stefano Tognini)	2025	Alessandra Amoroso	Io non sarei
"Oh ma" (Written by Rocco Pagliarulo, Federica Abbate, Jacopo Ettorre, Eugenio Maimone, Federico Mercuri and Giordano Cremona)	2025	Rocco Hunt and Noemi	Ragazzo di giù
"Niente da dire" (Written by Claudia Lagona, Jacopo Ettorre, Gianmarco Manilardi and Antonio Filippelli)	2025	Levante	Dall'amore il fallimento e altri passi di danza
"Buona stella" (Written by Eros Ramazzotti, Elisa Toffoli, Jacopo Ettorre, Alessandro Pulga and Stefano Tognini)	2025	Eros Ramazzotti feat. Elisa	Una storia importante
"Tra le lune e le dune" (Written by Jacopo Ettorre, Dario Faini and Nicola Lazzarin)	2025	Giorgia	G
