= Nuda (album) =

2020 studio album by Annalisa

Studio album by Annalisa
- Released: 18 September 2020
- Recorded: 2019
- Genre: Electropop
- Length: 43:00
- Language: Italian
- Label: Warner Music Italy
- Producers: d.whale; Dardust; Michele Canova

Annalisa chronology
Bye Bye (2018)	Nuda (2020)	E poi siamo finiti nel vortice (2023)

Singles from Nuda
- 1. "Vento sulla luna" Released: 29 November 2019; 2. "Houseparty" Released: 15 April 2020; 3. "Tsunami" Released: 4 September 2020; 4. "Dieci" Released: 3 March 2021; 5. "Movimento lento" Released: 28 May 2021; 6. "Eva+Eva" Released: 8 October 2021

Nuda is the seventh studio album by Italian singer-songwriter Annalisa, released on 18 September 2020 by Warner Music Italy. On 12 March 2021, the album was re-released, subtitled Nuda10 (in celebration of the artist's tenth career anniversary), containing five previously unreleased songs, including the single "Dieci" which was presented at the Sanremo Music Festival 2021.

== Release and promotion ==
The release of Nuda was anticipated by three singles and a buzz single, "Avocado Toast", that was excluded from the project. The first single, "Vento sulla luna", featuring Italian rapper Rkomi, was released on 28 November 2019. In a press release, Annalisa announced that the album would not feature "Avocado Toast" and was scheduled for a spring 2020 release. Describing "Vento sulla luna", Annalisa said "the song talks about those moments when you get lost in your thoughts and you can feel alone even in the middle of a crowd". A launch party for the album, named "Il party sulla luna", was also announced for 4 May 2020; however this date was later delayed to 22 October 2020, and again to 5 May 2021 and 6 December 2021 as a result of the COVID-19 pandemic.

"Houseparty" was released as the album's second single on 15 April 2020, coinciding with Annalisa's announcement of the album's new September release date. Nuda was made available for pre-order on 25 August 2020, alongside the reveal of the album's track listing and cover art. "Graffiti" was included as an instant pre-order bonus. "Tsunami" was released as the album's third single on 4 September 2020, and received its live debut the following day at the SEAT Music Awards 2020 at the Arena di Verona. The song was adapted from an entry in Annalisa's diary. Following its release on 18 September 2020, the album debuted and peaked at number 2 on the Italian album chart.

=== Nuda10 edition ===
On 17 December 2020, it was announced that Annalisa would be amongst the participants at the Sanremo Music Festival 2021, performing the new single "Dieci". This would be Annalisa's fifth appearance at the festival, following her most recent entry in 2018 with the song "Il mondo prima di te", finishing third. Annalisa premiered "Dieci" on 2 March 2021, the first evening of the festival, and the song was released on digital platforms on the following day. "Dieci" finished 7th in the festival, as well as peaking at number 7 on the Italian singles chart, speaking 5 weeks in the top 10. The song also earned a double platinum certification in Italy for combined sales exceeding 140,000 copies.

Annalisa described "Dieci" as the story of "a love that does not want to end" and speaks of "clinging to the last times that will never be the last". A new edition of the album, titled Nuda10, was released on 12 March 2021, to coincide with Annalisa's participation in the Sanremo Music Festival. The re-release adds "Dieci", three other previously unreleased songs, two reimagined versions of Annalisa's past singles and the cover of Ornella Vanoni's "La musica è finita" that Annalisa had performed on the third evening of the Sanremo Music Festival. The release of Nuda10 caused the album to return to its peak of number 2 on the Italian albums chart, and the album was certified gold in Italy in April 2021.

On 28 May 2021 a new version of "Movimento lento", featuring Italian singer Federico Rossi, was released as a single. The song was promoted with a TikTok dance challenge, gaining significant viral popularity in Italy. The song peaked at number 8 on the Italian singles chart and was certified double platinum.

== Track listing ==
Nuda – Standard track listing
No.	Title	Writer(s)	Producer(s)	Length
1.	"Nuda"	Annalisa Scarrone; Paolo Antonacci; Jacopo Matteo D'Amico; Davide Simonetta	d.whale	3:01
2.	"Romantica" (featuring J-Ax)	Scarrone; Alessandro Aleotti; Daniele Lazzarin; Michele Canova; Yves Agbessi	d.whale	3:15
3.	"Tsunami"	Scarrone; Alessandro Raina; Simonetta	d.whale	3:45
4.	"Houseparty"	Scarrone; Jacopo Ettorre; Simonetta	Canova; Pat "MyBestFault" Simonini	3:26
5.	"Cena di Natale"	Scarrone; Lazzarin; Canova	Canova	3:31
6.	"Bonsai"	Scarrone; Giulia Ananìa; Simonetta	d.whale	3:06
7.	"Piove col sole"	Scarrone; Lazzarin; Canova	Canova	3:22
8.	"Principessa" (featuring Chadia Rodríguez)	Scarrone; Chadia Rodríguez; Giovanni Cerrati; Jack Camilleri; Canova; Patrizio Simonini	Canova	2:58
9.	"Graffiti"	Scarrone; Leonardo Zaccaria; Canova; Vincenzo Colella	Canova	3:29
10.	"D'oro"	Scarrone; Ettorre; Canova; Simonini	Canova	2:59
11.	"A te cosa piace fare"	Scarrone; Sergio Vallarino	Canova	3:12
12.	"Vento sulla luna" (featuring Rkomi)	Scarrone; Mirko Martorana; Federico Bertollini; Dario Faini	Dardust	3:51
13.	"N.U.D.A. (Nascere umani diventare animali)" (featuring Achille Lauro)	Scarrone; Lauro de Marinis; Lazzarin; Canova	Canova	3:15
Total length:				43:15

Nuda10 – Anniversary edition physical edition
No.	Title	Writer(s)	Producer(s)	Length
1.	"Dieci"	Scarrone; Antonacci; D'Amico; Simonetta	d.whale	3:18
2.	"Eva + Eva"	Scarrone; Bertollini; Faini	DORADO INC.	3:01
3.	"Amsterdam" (featuring Alfa)	Scarrone; Andrea De Filippi; Antonacci; Simonetta	d.whale	2:50
17.	"Movimento lento"	Scarrone; Ettorre; Eugenio Maimone; Federico Mercuri; Giordano Cremona; Leonardo Grillotti	ITACA	3:13
18.	"Alice e il blu" (new version)	Faini	DORADO INC.	4:00
19.	"Il mondo prima di te" (featuring Michele Bravi)	Scarrone; Raina; Simonetta	Canova	3:37
Total length:				1:04:00

Nuda10 – Anniversary digital edition bonus track
No.	Title	Writer(s)	Length
20.	"La musica è finita" (cover of Ornella Vanoni's song)	Franco Califano; Nicola Salerno; Umberto Bindi	3:46
Total length:			1:07:00

Nuda10 – 2021 digital reissue bonus track
No.	Title	Writer(s)	Producer(s)	Length
1.	"Movimento lento" (with Federico Rossi)	Scarrone; Ettorre; Maimone; Mercuri; Cremona; Grillotti	ITACA	3:13
Total length:				1:10:00

== Charts ==
=== Weekly charts ===
Weekly chart performance for Nuda
Chart (2020)	Peak position
Italian Albums (FIMI)	2

=== Year-end charts ===
Year-end chart performance for Nuda
Chart (2021)	Position
Italian Albums (FIMI)	37

== Certifications ==
Certifications for Nuda
Region	Certification	Certified units/sales
Italy (FIMI)	Platinum	50,000^{‡}
^{‡} Sales+streaming figures based on certification alone.
