= Mi ami mi odi =

- "Erotica" edition physical cover and standard edition digital cover

Studio album by Elodie
- Released: 2 May 2025
- Recorded: 2024–2025
- Genres: Pop; electropop; R&B
- Length: 37:09
- Label: Island Records
- Producers: Elodie; B-Croma; Cripo; Dardust; d.whale; Golden Years; ITACA; Lvnar; Matteo Cantaluppi; Rvssian; Simon Says!; Wolvs

Elodie chronology
OK. Respira (2023)	Mi ami mi odi (2025)

Singles from Mi ami mi odi
- 1. "Black Nirvana" Released: 31 May 2024; 2. "Feeling" Released: 8 November 2024; 3. "Dimenticarsi alle 7" Released: 12 February 2025; 4. "Mi ami mi odi" Released: 4 April 2025; 5. "Yakuza" Released: 27 June 2025

Mi ami mi odi is the fifth studio album by Italian singer-songwriter Elodie, released on 2 May 2025 by Island Records.

The album featured "Dimenticarsi alle 7", presented by the singer during the Sanremo Music Festival 2025 where it took 12th place among the final ranking.

== Background and composition ==
After the publication of the fourth studio album OK. Respira and the mixtape Red Light, Elodie announced in 2024 that she was working on a new record project.

The record project is composed of twelve tracks, written and composed by herself together with songwriters and producers the singer-songwriter has previously worked with, including Elisa, Joan Thiele, Jacopo Èt, Dario Faini and Davide Petrella. The album features two collaborations with Tiziano Ferro and Lorenzza. In an interview with Rolling Stone Italia magazine, the singer-songwriter spoke about the significance of the album:

"I want everyone when listening to the album to feel strong and sexy. It is empowerment in purity. The ability to make others feel powerful makes everyone and everyone more free. Finding out how much you are worth, when others think of you, is crucial. Don't wait for others to tell you who you are: being in the hands of others can be very dangerous. [...] Mi ami mi odi tells about a night when you change, one of those nights you remember. For me it's always in the morning when things really happen, not during the night that has just passed. During the night you vent everything, you get up, you lose yourself and in the end you find yourself again. When you come home, with the light coming in through the windows, you say to yourself: ‘maybe I could have done better’. This has often happened to me. That's when, between the tiredness and the new light, you manage to put things in order. That's when your desires really emerge. It's one of my favourite moments when I do that. I want to remain clear about what is happening in the world, about my own pain and that of others, but also find the strength to transform it into something different."

== Track listing ==
Mi ami mi odi – Standard track listing
No.	Title	Writer(s)	Producer(s)	Length
1.	"Odio amore chimico"	Elodie Di Patrizi; Alessandro La Cava; Federica Abbate; Leonardo Grillotti	Wolvs	3:40
2.	"Thaurus"	Elodie; Alessandra Joan Thiele; Marco Spaggiari; Rocco Giovannoni	B-Croma	2:43
3.	"1 ora"	Elodie; Valeria Palmitessa; Marco Ferrario	Lvnar	2:57
4.	"Di nuovo"	Elodie; Palmitessa; Gianluca Franco; Walter Coppola; Ferrario	Lvnar	2:27
5.	"Mi ami mi odi"	Elodie; Elisa Toffoli; Jacopo Ettorre; Dario Faini	Dardust; Cripo	3:31
6.	"Cuore nero"	Elodie; La Cava; Abbate; Nicola Lazzarin	Cripo	2:33
7.	"Dimenticarsi alle 7"	Elodie; Davide Petrella; Davide Simonetta	Elodie; d.whale	3:34
8.	"Black Nirvana"	Elodie; Ettorre; Abbate; Eugenio Maimone; Federico Mercuri; Giordano Cremona; Grillotti	ITACA	3:04
9.	"Muah"	Elodie; Palmitessa; Ettorre; Simone Privitera	Simon Says!	2:51
10.	"Feeling" (with Tiziano Ferro)	Elodie; Tiziano Ferro; Abbate; Ettorre; Pietro Paroletti; DJ Toss	Golden Years	2:40
11.	"In grado" (with Lorenzza)	Elodie; Lorenzza Lacerda Campos; Arianna Del Giaccio; Paroletti	Golden Years	2:35
12.	"Raro"	Elodie; Daniele Possatelli; Matteo Cantaluppi	Cantaluppi	4:34
Total length:				37:09

Mi ami mi odi – Digital reissue bonus tracks
No.	Title	Writer(s)	Producer(s)	Length
2.	"Yakuza" (with Sfera Ebbasta)	Elodie; Gionata Boschetti; La Cava; Tarik Johnston; Abbate; Maximilian Agostini; Davide Longhi	Rvssian	2:56
Total length:				40:05

== Charts ==
Chart performance for Mi ami mi odi
Chart (2025)	Peak position
Italian Albums (FIMI)	3

== Certifications ==
Certifications for "Mi ami mi odi"
Region	Certification	Certified units/sales
Italy (FIMI)	Platinum	50,000^{‡}
^{‡} Sales+streaming figures based on certification alone.

== Personnel ==
=== Musicians ===
- Elodie – songwriting, lead vocals (all tracks), production, vocal production (track 7)
- Alessandra Joan Thiele – songwriting (track 2)
- Alessandro La Cava – songwriting (tracks 1, 6, bonus)
- Arianna Del Ghiaccio – songwriting (track 11)
- Daniele Posatelli – songwriting (track 12)
- Dario Faini – songwriting and production (track 5)
- Davide Longhi – songwriting (bonus track)
- Davide Petrella – songwriting (track 7)
- Davide Simonetta – songwriting and co-production (track 7)
- Elisa Toffoli – songwriting (track 5)
- Eugenio Maimone – co-production (track 8)
- Federica Abbate – songwriting (tracks 1, 6, 10, bonus)
- Federico Mercuri – co-production (track 8)
- Gianluca Franco – songwriting (track 4)
- Gionata Boschetti – co-lead vocals and songwriting (bonus track)
- Giordano Cremona – co-production (track 8)
- Jacopo Ettorre – songwriting (track 5, 8, 9, 10)
- Leonardo Grillotti – production (track 1)
- Lorenzza Lacerda Campos – featured vocals and songwriting (track 11)
- Mario Ferrario – production (tracks 3, 4)
- Marco Spaggiari – production (track 2)
- Matteo Cantaluppi – production (track 12)
- Maximilian Agostini – songwriting (bonus track)
- Nicola Lazzarin – production (track 6)
- Pietro Paroletti – songwriting and production (tracks 10, 11)
- Rocco Giovannoni – production (track 2)
- Simone Privitera – production (track 9)
- Tarik Johnston – production (bonus track)
- Tiziano Ferro – co-lead vocals and songwriting (track 10)
- Valeria Palmitessa – songwriting (tracks 3, 4, 9)
- Walter Coppola – songwriting (track 4)

=== Management ===
- Elodie – executive production
- Jacopo Pesce – executive production
- Max Brigante – executive production

=== Artwork ===
- Emanuele Cristofoli – creative direction
- Matteo Bonacci – art direction
- Federico Terenzio – photography
- Giulia Cova – fashion styling

== Elodie Show 2025 ==
Elodie Show 2025
- National tour by Elodie
- Location: Italy
- Associated album: Mi ami mi odi
- Start date: June 8, 2025
- End date: December 6, 2025
- Legs: 2
- No. of shows: 16 in Italy; 16 in total

Elodie concert chronology
- Elodie Show 2023 (2023); Elodie Show 2025 (2025)

Elodie Show 2025 is the second arena tour by Italian singer-songwriter Elodie in support of her fifth studio album Mi ami mi odi.

=== Shows ===
List of 2025 concerts, showing date, city, country and venue
Date	City	Country	Venue
The Stadium Show
June 8	Milan	Italy	San Siro
June 12	Naples	Italy	Stadio Maradona
Indoor Arenas Tour
October 29	Jesolo	Italy	Palazzo del Turismo
October 31	Milan	Italy	Unipol Forum
November 1	Milan	Italy	Unipol Forum
November 8	Eboli	Italy	PalaSele
November 12	Padua	Italy	Kioene Arena
November 14	Florence	Italy	Nelson Mandela Forum
November 19	Rome	Italy	PalaLottomatica
November 20	Rome	Italy	PalaLottomatica
November 24	Messina	Italy	PalaRescifina
November 25	Messina	Italy	PalaRescifina
November 28	Bari	Italy	PalaFlorio
November 29	Bari	Italy	PalaFlorio
December 1	Turin	Italy	Inalpi Arena
December 6	Rome	Italy	PalaLottomatica

=== Set list ===
The following set list represents the arenas shows of the tour. The Stadium Show follows a different set list.

1. "Bagno a mezzanotte"
2. "Black Nirvana"
3. "Guaranà" / "Hung Up"
4. "I Feel Love"
5. "OK. Respira"
6. "Odio amore chimico" / "1 ora" / "Di nuovo"
7. "Mi ami mi odi"
8. "Cuore nero" / "Anche stasera"
9. "Yakuza"
10. "La coda del diavolo"
11. "Andromeda"
12. "Vertigine"
13. "Niente canzoni d'amore"
14. "Pensare male"
15. "Feeling"
16. "Pop porno"
17. "Red Light"
18. "Ascendente"
19. "Elle"
20. "Strobo"
21. "Euphoria" / "Lontano da qui"
22. "A fari spenti"
23. "Tutta colpa mia"
24. "Due"
25. "Dimenticarsi alle 7"

Encore

26. "Tribale"
27. "Ex"
28. "Pazza musica"
29. "Ciclone"
30. "Margarita"
