= Nei letti degli altri =

Studio album by Mahmood
- Released: 16 February 2024
- Genre: Electropop; baile funk; R&B
- Length: 38:04
- Language: Italian; French; Portuguese
- Label: Island
- Producer: Dardust; Madfingerz; Francesco "Katoo" Catitti; Francesco Fugazza; Drast; Golden Years; Michelangelo; Lvnar; LUCASV; BGRZ; d.whale; Marcello Grilli

Mahmood chronology
Ghettolimpo (2021)	Nei letti degli altri (2024)

Singles from Nei letti degli altri
- 1. "Cocktail d'amore" Released: 3 November 2023; 2. "Tuta gold" Released: 7 February 2024; 3. "Ra ta ta" Released: 13 June 2024; 4. "Sottomarini" Released: 21 February 2025

Professional ratings
Review scores
Source	Rating
Ondarock	7/10

Nei letti degli altri (English: In Other People's Beds) is the third studio album by Italian singer-songwriter Mahmood. The album was released on 16 February 2024 and was preceded by the singles "Cocktail d'amore" and the Sanremo Music Festival 2024 entry "Tuta gold".

== Track listing ==
Nei letti degli altri – Standard track listing
No.	Title	Lyrics	Music	Producer(s)	Length
1.	"NLDA Intro" (featuring Slim Soledad)	Alessandro Mahmoud; Slina Da Soledade	Mahmoud; Da Soledade; Francesco Fugazza; Marcello Grilli	Fugazza; Grilli; Slim Soledad	1:29
2.	"Tuta gold"	Mahmoud; Jacopo Ettorre	Mahmoud; Ettorre; Francesco Catitti	Katoo; MadFingerz	2:57
3.	"Personale" (featuring Geolier)	Mahmoud; Emanuele Palumbo	Mahmoud; Mike Kevin Gbaguidi	BGRZ	2:33
4.	"Overdose"	Mahmoud	Mahmoud; Gbaguidi	BGRZ	2:06
5.	"Cocktail d'amore"	Mahmoud	Mahmoud; Alessio Buongiorno; Paolo Alberto Monachetti; Fugazza; Grilli	Dardust	3:23
6.	"Sempre / Jamais" (featuring Angèle)	Mahmoud; Angèle Van Leaken	Mahmoud; Dario Faini; Lucas Vuaflart	Dardust; Lucasv	3:12
7.	"Nei letti degli altri"	Mahmoud	Mahmoud; Marco De Cesaris; Pietro Paroletti	Drast; Golden Years	3:10
8.	"Tutti contro tutti"	Mahmoud	Mahmoud; Michele Zocca	Michelangelo	3:05
9.	"Bakugo"	Mahmoud; Walter Coppola	Mahmoud; Marco Ferrario; Vuaflart	Lucasv; Lvnar	2:48
10.	"Neve sulle Jordan" (featuring Capo Plaza)	Mahmoud; Luca D'Orso	Mahmoud; Gbaguidi; Fugazza; Grilli	BGRZ; Fugazza; Grilli	3:00
11.	"Nel tuo mare"	Mahmoud; Davide Petrella	Mahmoud; Davide Simonetta	d.whale	3:28
12.	"Paradiso" (featuring Chiello and Tedua)	Mahmoud; Rocco Modello; Mario Molinari	Mahmoud; Zocca	Michelangelo	3:02
13.	"Stella cadente"	Mahmoud	Mahmoud; Fugazza; Grilli	Fugazza; Grilli	3:35
Total length:					38:04

Nei letti degli altri – Digital edition bonus tracks
No.	Title	Lyrics	Music	Producer(s)	Length
1.	"Sottomarini"	Mahmoud	Mahmoud; Simonetta	d.whale	2:53
2.	"Ra ta ta"	Mahmoud; Ettore; Schiara	Mahmoud; Catitti; Ettorre; Schiara; Emilio Barberini	Katoo; Madfingerz	2:32
Total length:					43:22

== Charts ==
=== Weekly charts ===
Weekly chart performance for Nei letti degli altri
Chart (2024)	Peak position
Italian Albums (FIMI)	1
Lithuanian Albums (AGATA)	93
Swiss Albums (Schweizer Hitparade)	27

=== Year-end charts ===
Year-end chart performance for Nei letti degli altri
Chart (2024)	Position
Italian Albums (FIMI)	12

== Certifications ==
Certifications for Nei letti degli altri
Region	Certification	Certified units/sales
Italy (FIMI)	2× Platinum	100,000^{‡}
^{‡} Sales+streaming figures based on certification alone.
