= Movimento lento =

Single by Annalisa featuring Federico Rossi

from the album Nuda10
- Released: 28 May 2021
- Genre: Reggaeton
- Length: 3:13
- Label: Warner Music Italy
- Songwriters: Annalisa Scarrone; Jacopo Ettorre; Federico Mercuri; Giordano Cremona; Eugenio Maimone; Leonardo Grillotti
- Producer: ITACA

Annalisa singles chronology
"Dieci" (2021)	"Movimento lento" (2021)	"Eva+Eva" (2021)

Federico Rossi singles chronology
"Pesche" (2021)	"Movimento lento" (2021)	"Non è mai troppo tardi" (2021)

Music video
- "Movimento lento" on YouTube

"Movimento lento" is a song by Italian singer Annalisa with featured vocals by Italian singer Federico Rossi. It was released by Warner Music Italy on 28 May 2021 as the second single from the re-issue of her seventh studio album Nuda10.

It was written by Annalisa, Jacopo Ettorre, Eugenio Maimone, Leonardo Grillotti and Merk & Kremont, and produced by the collective ITACA. The song peaked at number 8 on the FIMI Singles Chart and was certified triple platinum in Italy.

== Music video ==
The music video of "Movimento lento" was directed by Mauro Russo and released onto YouTube on 8 June 2021.

== Track listing ==
Digital download
No.	Title	Length
1.	"Movimento lento"	3:13

== Charts ==
=== Weekly charts ===
Chart performance for "Movimento lento"
Chart (2021–2022)	Peak position
Bulgaria (PROPHON)	10
Italy (FIMI)	8
Italy Airplay (EarOne)	11
San Marino (SMRRTV Top 50)	17

=== Year-end charts ===
Year-end chart performance for "Movimento lento"
Chart (2021)	Position
Italy (FIMI)	30

== Certifications ==
Region	Certification	Certified units/sales
Italy (FIMI)	3× Platinum	300,000^{‡}
^{‡} Sales+streaming figures based on certification alone.
