= Cocktail d'amore =

Cocktail d'amore (Italian for 'Love Cocktail') may refer to:

- "Cocktail d'amore" (Mahmood song), 2023
- "Cocktail d'amore" (Stefania Rotolo song), 1979
