= Dimenticarsi alle 7 =

2025 single by Elodie

Single by Elodie

from the album Mi ami mi odi
- Language: Italian
- Released: February 12, 2025
- Genre: Deep house; disco; techno
- Length: 3:34
- Label: Island; Double Trouble Club
- Songwriters: Elodie Di Patrizi; Davide Petrella; Davide Simonetta
- Producers: Elodie; d.whale

Elodie singles chronology
"Feeling" (2024)	"Dimenticarsi alle 7" (2025)	"Mi ami mi odi" (2025)

Music video
- "Dimenticarsi alle 7" on YouTube

"Dimenticarsi alle 7" (Italian for "Forget about each other at 7 AM") is a song written, recorded and produced by Italian singer-songwriter Elodie. It was released on February 12, 2025, through Island and Double Trouble Club Records as the third single from the singer's fifth studio album Mi ami mi odi.

The song was presented and competed in the 75th edition of Sanremo Music Festival, held from February 11 to February 15, 2025, where it eventually placed 12th among the final ranking.

== Music and lyrics ==
"Dimenticarsi alle 7" was written by Elodie, who also produced the song, alongside Davide Petrella and Davide "d.whale" Simonetta. In the lyrics, Elodie refers to a symbolic moment in the morning—7 AM—when someone is still up after a long night out and is trying to move on from someone, hoping to leave the past and their feelings behind, even though letting go isn't always easy. Referring to the song as "a drama", Elodie about "Dimenticarsi alle 7" declared:

"It is a song that I really love. It tells about two sides of me: the dramatic one that only love can trigger. On one hand, I'm desperate, but always in a chic way. On the other, I blend melodrama with the electronic music of this track, which represents me a lot. For the first time ever, I wanted to be involved in the production; I had an idea. There's so much of me in it: my references, my nights out. I love to have fun, and this job lets me do that."

== Promotion and release ==
On December 1, 2024, Carlo Conti, the main presenter of the Sanremo 2025 Music Festival, announced live on TG1 that Elodie would participate in the Festival. The song's title was announced more than two weeks later, on December 18, during the grand finale of Sanremo Giovani, a separated musical competition related to Sanremo Festival but specifically dedicated to newcomers in order to give them an opportunity in Italian music industry and to get better exposure. The song was released on all music platforms, including Spotify, at 1:30 AM on February 12, 2025, after the conclusion of the first night of the Sanremo Music Festival, where Elodie presented and performed the song live for the first time ever. The song was subsequently sent to Italian radio on the same day.

== Critical reception ==
"Dimenticarsi alle 7" received generally positive reviews from music critics.

Andrea Laffranchi from Corriere della Sera described "Dimenticarsi alle 7" as a "song with vintage flavour, evoking the 1960s of a melancholic Mina", where the sound is driven by "an orchestra building up drama" and "an undestated techno beat grounding it in the present". Gianni Sibilla from Rockol also noted that the song "blends orchestra and electronic, melody and a steady beat", defining it "ambitious". Rolling Stone's journalist Filippo Ferrari highlights the song's "electronic production" and a chorus melody reminiscent of "a classic Italian ballad".

Some journalists found similarities with Elodie's previous songs. Alvise Salerno from AllMusic Italia described the song as being constructed "without adding or taking away anything" artistically from the singer, noting its resemblance to the sound of previous tracks such as "Andromeda" or "Black Nirvana". Similarly, Roberta Marchetti from Today stated that, while the chorus is "undeniably catchy", the rest of the song "feels like a big déjà vu, nothing memorable". Music critics from Esquire Italia, describing the song as "yet another ballad [that] adds little to her as an artist and to her career", considered the song as Elodie's attempt to become the "kinda-Italian-Beyoncé".

== Music video ==
An accompanying music video for "Dimenticarsi alle 7" was released on February 12, 2025, on Elodie's YouTube official channel. The music video, directed by Attilio Cusani, is set in a small theatre and features Elodie singing her song for a small audience.

== Charts ==
=== Weekly charts ===
Chart performance for "Dimenticarsi alle 7"
Chart (2025)	Peak position
Italy (FIMI)	7
Italy Airplay (EarOne)	9
Switzerland (Schweizer Hitparade)	59

=== Year-end charts ===
Year-end chart performance for "Dimenticarsi alle 7"
Chart (2025)	Position
Italy (FIMI)	52

== Certifications ==
Certifications for "Dimenticarsi alle 7"
Region	Certification	Certified units/sales
Italy (FIMI)	Platinum	200,000^{‡}
^{‡} Sales+streaming figures based on certification alone.
