= Summer Camp (2024 film) =

Film by Castille Landon

- Theatrical release poster
- Directed by: Castille Landon
- Written by: Castille Landon
- Produced by: Dori A. Rath; Alex Saks; Diane Keaton; Stephanie Heaton-Harris; Tyler W. Konney
- Starring: Diane Keaton; Kathy Bates; Alfre Woodard; Beverly D'Angelo; Nicole Richie; Josh Peck; Betsy Sodaro; Dennis Haysbert; Eugene Levy
- Cinematography: Karsten "Crash" Gopinath
- Edited by: Morgan Halsey
- Music by: Tom Howe
- Production companies: Saks Picture Company; Project Infinity
- Distributed by: Roadside Attractions
- Release date: May 31, 2024
- Running time: 92 minutes
- Country: United States
- Language: English
- Box office: $2.6 million

Summer Camp is a 2024 American comedy film written and directed by Castille Landon. It stars Diane Keaton, Kathy Bates, Alfre Woodard, Beverly D'Angelo, Nicole Richie, Josh Peck, Betsy Sodaro, Dennis Haysbert, and Eugene Levy.

The film was released theatrically by Roadside Attractions in the United States on May 31, 2024. It received negative reviews from critics.

== Premise ==
Nora, Ginny, and Mary have been close friends since they were children, and have spent their summer vacations together without fail, attending sleepaway camp as a trio. As they have aged, their opportunities to spend time together have dwindled, and thus, when the chance for a summer camp reunion presents itself, they all accept it, albeit with different levels of enthusiasm.

== Cast ==
- Diane Keaton as Nora
- Kathy Bates as Ginny Moon
- Alfre Woodard as Mary
- Eugene Levy as Stevie "Stevie D"
- Dennis Haysbert as Tommy
- Beverly D'Angelo as Jane
- Nicole Richie as Sage
- Josh Peck as Jimmy
- Betsy Sodaro as Vick Cockburn
- Tom Wright as Mike
- Victoria Rowell as Evelyn
- Maria Howell as Judy
- Raymond Santiago as Brian
- Arielle Kebbel as Frankie

Additionally, Castille Landon appears as a cheery counselor, Eugenie Bondurant plays a sobbing camper and Ashley Padilla appears as a fan of Ginny. Besides her work as an actress, Padilla was an assistant to Keaton.

== Production ==
In February 2023, Deadline reported that Diane Keaton, Kathy Bates and Alfre Woodard signed on to star in the comedy film, Summer Camp, directed and written by Castille Landon. The following month, Eugene Levy was added to the cast as the love interest of Keaton's character. In April, Beverly D'Angelo, Dennis Haysbert, Nicole Richie, Josh Peck, Betsy Sodaro and Tom Wright were added to the cast.

Principal photography began in North Carolina in April 2023 and wrapped in late May. Filming took place primarily at Camp Pinnacle and Blue Ridge Community College in Hendersonville. Producer Dori Rath researched more than 200 summer camps across the United States out of "about 14,500 total summer camps" in the country before choosing Camp Pinnacle. She told the Asheville Citizen-Times, "Camp Pinnacle stood head and shoulders above the rest when it came to production value and a rich, cinematic landscape with exceptional activities-based structures, like their Sky Ropes course". Other filming locations were Wingate University, Nantahala Outdoor Center and UNC Health Pardee. Over 1,000 local extras were hired for the film. The film was in post-production by October 2023.

== Release ==
In April 2024, Roadside Attractions acquired U.S. distribution rights to the film, and released theatrically on May 31, 2024.

== Reception ==
On the review aggregator website Rotten Tomatoes, 8% of 38 critics' reviews are positive, with an average rating of 3.3/10. The website's consensus reads: "Pack it in — this lame comedy is about as fun as summer school." Metacritic, which uses a weighted average, assigned the film a score of 41 out of 100, based on 9 critics, indicating "mixed or average" reviews. Audiences polled by CinemaScore gave the film an average grade of "C" on an A+ to F scale.
