= Yakuza (song) =

Single by Elodie and Sfera Ebbasta

from the album Mi ami mi odi (digital re-issue)
- Released: 27 June 2025
- Length: 2:56
- Label: Island; Double Trouble Club
- Composers: Elodie Di Patrizi; Federica Abbate; Tarik Johnston; Davide Longhi; Maximilian Agostini; Oswaldo Rangel
- Lyricists: Elodie Di Patrizi; Gionata Boschetti; Alessandro La Cava
- Producer: Rvssian

Elodie singles chronology
"Mi ami mi odi" (2025)	"Yakuza" (2025)	"Ex" (2025)

Sfera Ebbasta singles chronology
"Neon" (2025)	"Yakuza" (2025)

Music video
- "Yakuza" on YouTube

"Yakuza" is a song by Italian singer Elodie and Italian rapper Sfera Ebbasta, released on 27 June 2025 by Island Records and Double Trouble Club. It was produced by Rvssian, and included in the digital re-issue of Elodie's fifth studio album, Mi ami mi odi.

It peaked at number 4 on the Italian Singles Chart.

== Music video ==
A music video to accompany the release of "Yakuza", directed by Sfera Ebbasta himself together with Mattia Bonato, was released via YouTube on the same day.

== Charts ==
=== Weekly charts ===
Weekly chart performance for "Yakuza"
Chart (2025)	Peak position
Italy (FIMI)	4
Italy Airplay (EarOne)	7

=== Year-end charts ===
Year-end chart performance for "Yakuza"
Chart (2025)	Position
Italy (FIMI)	37

== Certifications ==
Region	Certification	Certified units/sales
Italy (FIMI)	Platinum	200,000^{‡}
^{‡} Sales+streaming figures based on certification alone.
