= Ra ta ta =

- Official cover

Single by Mahmood

from the album Nei letti degli altri (Digital edition only)
- Released: 14 June 2024
- Genre: Afrobeats
- Length: 2:32
- Label: Island; Universal
- Songwriters: Alessandro Mahmoud; Jacopo Ettorre; Francesco Catitti; Emilio Barberini
- Producers: Katoo; Madfingerz

Mahmood singles chronology
"Tuta gold" (2024)	"Ra ta ta" (2024)	"Sottomarini" (2025)

Music video
- "Ra ta ta" on YouTube

"Ra ta ta" is a song co-written and recorded by Italian singer Mahmood. It was released for digital download and streaming on 14 June 2024 by Island Records and Universal Music.

The song was written by Alessandro Mahmoud, Jacopo Ettorre, Francesco Catitti and Emilio Barberini, and produced by the latter two. It was included on the digital reissue of Mahmood's third studio album, Nei letti degli altri.

== Music video ==
A music video to accompany the release of "Ra ta ta" was first released onto YouTube on 14 June 2024. The video was directed by Attilio Cusani and Mahmood himself, and shot in Tunisia.

== Charts ==
=== Weekly charts ===
Weekly chart performance for "Ra ta ta"
Chart (2024)	Peak position
Italy (FIMI)	6
Italy Airplay (EarOne)	1

=== Year-end charts ===
2024 year-end chart performance for "Ra ta ta"
Chart (2024)	Position
Italy (FIMI)	34

== Certifications ==
Certifications for "Ra ta ta"
Region	Certification	Certified units/sales
Italy (FIMI)	Platinum	100,000^{‡}
^{‡} Sales+streaming figures based on certification alone.
