= Houseparty (song) =

Single by Annalisa

from the album Nuda
- Released: 15 April 2020
- Genre: Electropop
- Length: 3:26
- Label: Warner Music Italy
- Songwriters: Annalisa Scarrone; Jacopo Ettorre; Davide Simonetta
- Producers: Michele Canova; Patrizio Simonini

Annalisa singles chronology
"Supercalifragili" (2020)	"Houseparty" (2020)	"Tsunami" (2020)

Music video
- "Houseparty" on YouTube

"Houseparty" is a song co-written and recorded by Italian singer Annalisa. The song was released by Warner Music Italy on 15 April 2020 as the second single from her seventh studio album Nuda.

It was written by Annalisa, Davide Simonetta and Jacopo Ettorre, and produced by Michele Canova and Patrizio Simonini. The song peaked at number 73 on the FIMI Singles Chart.

== Music video ==
The animated music video of "Houseparty" was directed by Davide Bastolla and released onto YouTube on 21 April 2020.

== Track listing ==
Digital download
No.	Title	Length
1.	"Houseparty"	3:26

== Charts ==
Chart performance for "Houseparty"
Chart (2020)	Peak position
Italy (FIMI)	73

== Certifications ==
Region	Certification	Certified units/sales
Italy (FIMI)	Gold	35,000^{‡}
^{‡} Sales+streaming figures based on certification alone.
