= Vento sulla luna =

Single by Annalisa featuring Rkomi

from the album Nuda
- Released: 29 November 2019
- Genre: Pop rap
- Length: 3:51
- Label: Warner Music Italy
- Songwriters: Annalisa Scarrone; Mirko Martorana; Federico Bertollini; Dario Faini
- Producer: Dardust

Annalisa singles chronology
"Avocado Toast" (2019)	"Vento sulla luna" (2019)	"Supercalifragili" (2020)

Rkomi singles chronology
"Blu Part II" (2019)	"Vento sulla luna" (2019)	"Colori" (2020)

Music video
- "Vento sulla luna" on YouTube

"Vento sulla luna" (lit. 'Wind on the moon') is a song co-written and recorded by Italian singer Annalisa with featured vocals by Italian rapper Rkomi. It was released by Warner Music Italy on 29 November 2019 as the lead single from her seventh studio album Nuda.

The song was written by the two artists with co-writing contribution by Italian singer-songwriter Franco126 and composed and produced by Dario Faini.

== Composition ==
It was written by Annalisa, Rkomi, Franco126 and Dardust, and produced by Dardust.

== Music video ==
A music video to accompany the release of "Vento sulla luna" was then released onto YouTube on 3 December 2019. The video was directed by Enea Colombi and shot in the Monte Amiata Housing in Milan.

== Track listing ==
Digital download
No.	Title	Length
1.	"Vento sulla luna"	3:51

== Charts ==
Chart performance for "Vento sulla luna"
Chart (2019)	Peak position
Italy (FIMI)	74
