= Castille Landon =

American director and actress

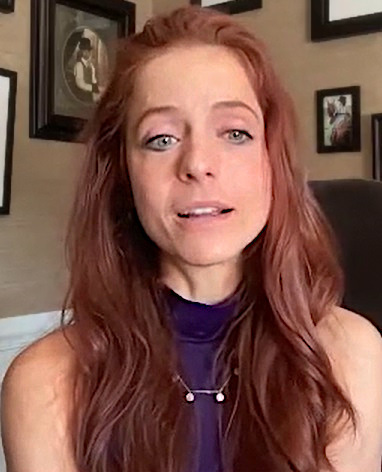
- Landon in 2024
- Born: October 2, 1991 (age 34); Bradenton, Florida, U.S
- Occupations: Actress, filmmaker
- Years active: 2007–present

Castille Landon Rath (born October 2, 1991) is an American actress and filmmaker. She directed the films Fear of Rain (2021), After We Fell (2021), After Ever Happy (2022) and After Everything (2023).

== Life and career ==
Landon was born in Bradenton, Florida. Her mother is film producer Dori A. Rath. She began her career as actress playing small roles on television series Ghost Whisperer and Tell Me You Love Me. She made her big screen debut playing a supporting role in the 2013 comedy film, Ass Backwards and the following year appeared in films X/Y, Among Ravens and Sex Ed. In 2016, she co-starred, wrote and directed fantasy film Albion: The Enchanted Stallion starring Jennifer Morrison, Stephen Dorff and Debra Messing. The following year, she made her second film, a family drama Apple of My Eye starring Amy Smart, AJ Michalka and Burt Reynolds.

In 2020, she directed After We Fell and After Ever Happy. In 2021, she with producers said, that later will be movies prequel and sequel. Later she didn't say anything about this information. Later Castille wrote script for After Everything with Josephine Langford and Hero Fiennes Tiffin together. In 2022, were filmed After Everything with parts from 2020. In 2023 year, Voltage Pictures announced that After Everything is fifth and final chapter of franchise.

In 2021, Landon directed and wrote the psychological thriller film, Fear of Rain starring Katherine Heigl and Madison Iseman. The film has an approval rating of 50% on Rotten Tomatoes based on 16 reviews. In 2023, she directed the sports drama film Perfect Addiction. Later in 2023, Landon wrote and directed the comedy film Summer Camp starring Diane Keaton, Kathy Bates and Alfre Woodard, which was released in May 2024 to generally negative reviews.

== Filmography ==
Year	Title	Director	Writer	Notes
2012	Every Other Second	No	Yes	Short film
2012	Halfway to Nowhere	No	Yes	Short film
2014	Swipe Right	Yes	Yes	Short film
2016	Albion: The Enchanted Stallion	Yes	Yes	
2017	Apple of My Eye	Yes	Yes	
2021	Fear of Rain	Yes	Yes	
2021	After We Fell	Yes	No	
2022	After Ever Happy	Yes	No	
2023	Perfect Addiction	Yes	No	
2023	After Everything	Yes	Yes	Also producer
2024	Summer Camp	Yes	Yes	
