= After Everything (2023 film) =

Film by Castille Landon

- Theatrical release poster
- Directed by: Castille Landon
- Screenplay by: Castille Landon
- Based on: After by Anna Todd
- Produced by: Jennifer Gibgot; Brian Pitt; Aron Levitz; Nicolas Chartier; Jonathan Deckter; Hero Fiennes Tiffin; Castille Landon
- Starring: Hero Fiennes Tiffin; Josephine Langford; Mimi Keene; Benjamin Mascolo; Louise Lombard; Stephen Moyer
- Cinematography: Josh Reis
- Edited by: Joshua Kirchmer
- Music by: George Kallis
- Production companies: Voltage Pictures; Ethea Entertainment; Wattpad Webtoon Studios
- Distributed by: Voltage Pictures
- Release date: September 13, 2023
- Running time: 93 minutes
- Country: United States
- Language: English
- Box office: $10.6 million

After Everything is a 2023 American romantic drama film written and directed by Castille Landon, based on the characters from the After series of novels by Anna Todd. The direct sequel to After Ever Happy (2022) and the fifth installment the After film series, it stars Josephine Langford and Hero Fiennes Tiffin reprising their roles as Tessa Young and Hardin Scott, respectively.

After his true love breaks up with him, best-selling author Hardin Scott seeks an ex he wronged now living in Portugal, hoping to become a better person by making amends for his past behavior.

The film was released in select theaters in the United States on September 13, 2023, by Voltage Pictures.

== Plot ==
Hardin is still pining for Tessa, a year after she broke up with him upon discovering his manuscript for After, their love story. His publisher Katherine urges him to produce a follow-up to the best-seller before year's end. She pressures him to go clubbing with her and her friend, which Hardin cannot enjoy as he has constant flashbacks of Tessa. They get him to take them to his place but his mood does not improve, so he drinks until he passes out.

Over a lunch with his mother and birth father the next day, Hardin is reprimanded for drinking again, wallowing and not trying to move on. He explains that he has writer's block because Tessa was his whole reason for being and his muse. Hardin's mum suggests he make peace with the past, then mentions that Natalie, a girl from his past, is now living in Lisbon.

Hardin flies down to make amends with Natalie, going to the bridal shop where she works. She ushers him out, but meets with him later. He has a flashback to when they first met. To recover an expensive watch in a poker game, Hardin accepted a bet to seduce her and produce proof, so he recorded it.

Natalie moved to Lisbon to escape the backlash from Hardin's friend making the video go viral. She had also lost her means to go to college and therefore decided to start afresh elsewhere. After they have caught up, Natalie invites Hardin to meet up with her and her friends on the beach. There Sebastian, a guy wary of him, talks him into cliff diving.

Sailing the next day with Natalie, Hardin tells her about when Tessa broke up with him. He then realises both situations were similar, as both had their private lives made public with no warning. Back on the beach, Sebastian and his friends beat Hardin up for flirting with another one of his friends. Hardin ends up in jail.

Hardin's birth father comes down and bails him out. He gives him a motivating pep talk, making him see that he can both hold a place in his heart for Tessa, but slowly work on moving forward. As Hardin is cleaning his space, he sees Landon's wedding invite, asking him to be his best man. He decides to stay a while longer, to try to write.

Natalie comes by with a care package for Hardin, apologizing for Sebastian's behavior. She almost kisses him, but he reminds her he is still in love with Tessa. Hardin thanks her for being able to forgive him.

Feeling inspired, Hardin starts writing again. Finishing the manuscript entitled Before, he gives a copy to Natalie, asking for her OK before submitting as she is included in it. She is happy with it, then Hardin surprises her with the coastal house of her dreams.

Back in America, Nora is with Tessa, nervously hoping the ceremony proceeds without a hitch. As best man and maid of honor, Hardin and Tessa walk down the aisle together, the first time they have seen each other in over two years. At the reception, he bribes his little half-brother to ask her to dance, so he can cut in.

Hardin's best man speech about missing half of his soul resonates with Tessa. He follows her out, they apologize to one another, then come together. Tessa calls them a mess, which he disagrees with. They decide they are inevitable. Hardin, in a moment of clarity, gets down on one knee and proposes.

Flash forward, Hardin arrives home with his book Later under his arm. He greets their little girl, then a visibly pregnant Tessa.

== Cast ==
- Hero Fiennes Tiffin as Hardin Scott
- Josephine Langford as Tessa Young
- Louise Lombard as Trish Daniels
- Stephen Moyer as Christian Vance
- Mimi Keene as Nathalie
- Benjamin Mascolo as Sebastian
- Cora Kirk as Freya
- Rosa Escoda as Kat
- Jessica Webber as Maddy
- Ella Martine as Naomi
- Laura Dutra as Paloma
- Chance Perdomo as Landon
- Kiana Madeira as Nora
- Rob Estes as Ken Scott
- Arielle Kebbel as Kimberly
- Aya Ivanova as Emery
- Carter Jenkins as Robert
- Anton Kottas as Smith
- Frances Turner as Karen

== Production ==
=== Development ===
In August 2022, it was announced that a fifth film had been in development concurrently with After Ever Happy. The film was written as an original story by director Castille Landon, and is the first installment not based on one of the titular novels. Josephine Langford and Hero Fiennes Tiffin were cast to once again reprise their roles as Tessa Young and Hardin Scott, respectively. Louise Lombard and Stephen Moyer were cast to reprise their roles as Trish Daniels and Christian Vance, respectively. Mimi Keene and Benjamin Mascolo joined the cast as new characters Natalie and Sebastian. Additionally, Cora Kirk, Rosa Escoda, Jessica Webber, and Ella Martine joined the film in supporting roles.

=== Filming ===
The film was secretly shot concurrently with the previous installment, as revealed in August 2022, in Portugal. The productions entered principal photography back-to-back, with the announcement of greenlighting, development, pre-production, principal photography, and subsequently post-production by that time.

== Release ==
After Everything was given a limited theatrical release in the United States on September 13, 2023, by Voltage Pictures. Fathom Events held special screenings of the film in the US on September 13 and 14, 2023. Internationally, it was released in select countries beginning September 13, 2023.

The film was released through video on demand in the US on October 3, 2023. It was made available on Amazon Prime Video in the United Kingdom and France on October 3, and in Australia and New Zealand on October 6.

== Future ==
Despite After Everything being marketed with the logline "The Final Chapter", Landon said in April 2021 that a prequel and an additional sequel centered around the children of the series' protagonists were in pre-production. As of 2026, a release date has yet to be determined.
