= Benjamin Mascolo =

Italian singer and actor (born 1993)

- Born: 20 June 1993 (age 33); Modena, Italy
- Other names: Benji; B3N
- Occupations: Singer, actor
- Years active: 2010–present
- Spouse: Greta Cuoghi (m. 2023)
- Partner: Bella Thorne (2019–2022)
- Children: 1

Benjamin Mascolo (born 20 June 1993), known professionally as Benji or B3N, is an Italian singer and actor.

== Career ==
Mascolo met Federico Rossi online and, together with him, formed the pop duo Benji & Fede in 2010. After the initial years, the duo was signed by the major label Warner and released four albums between 2015 and 2019, all of which reached the top of the Italian charts. The duo released several successful singles, including the 2019 summer hit "Dove e quando". In 2020, the duo announced their breakup, after which both musicians began solo careers.

Under the pseudonym B3N, Mascolo released his first solo EP California in 2021. That same year, he made his acting debut with a leading role in the romantic comedy Time Is Up, alongside Bella Thorne. He reprised his role in the film sequel Game of Love.

In 2023, Mascolo starred in After Everything, the fifth and final installment in the After film series. In October of the same year, he released his second solo EP, Il mio miglior nemico, returning to his former stage name, Benji.

== Personal life ==
From April 2019 to June 2022, he was in a relationship with American actress Bella Thorne and they announced their engagement in March 2021. However, in June 2022, the couple officially announced their split. Mascolo married Greta Cuoghi in November 2023. In 2025, they had a daughter named Athena.

== Discography ==
=== Solo ===
List of extended plays, with chart positions and certifications
Title	Details	Peak chart positions
Title	Details	ITA
California	Released: 26 February 2021; Label: Warner; Format: Digital download, streaming	5
Il mio miglior nemico	Released: 27 October 2023; Label: Warner; Format: Digital download, streaming	―

== Filmography ==
Film
Year	Title	Role	Notes
2021	Time Is Up	Roy	Film debut
2022	Game of Love	Roy	
2023	After Everything	Sebastian	
2024	Beyond After	Himself	Documentary
