= Fear of Rain =

- Theatrical release poster
- Directed by: Castille Landon
- Written by: Castille Landon
- Produced by: Dori A. Rath; Joseph J. Restaino; Robert Molloy; Joe Riley
- Starring: Madison Iseman; Israel Broussard; Harry Connick Jr.; Eugenie Bondurant; Katherine Heigl
- Cinematography: Joshua Reis
- Edited by: Morgan Halsey
- Music by: Jamie Muhoberac
- Production company: Zero Gravity Management
- Distributed by: Lionsgate
- Release date: February 12, 2021 (United States)
- Running time: 104 minutes
- Country: United States
- Language: English
- Box office: $24,565

Fear of Rain is a 2021 American psychological horror thriller film written and directed by Castille Landon. In the film, Rain (Madison Iseman), a teen living with schizophrenia, struggles with what she believes are terrifying hallucinations only to suspect her neighbor has kidnapped a child. The only person who believes her is a young boy named Caleb (Israel Broussard), but Rain is unsure whether or not the boy is real or another hallucination. Harry Connick Jr, Eugenie Bondurant and Katherine Heigl also star.

It received a limited theatrical release in the United States on February 12, 2021, by Lionsgate.

== Plot ==
17-year-old Rain Burroughs suffers from early onset schizophrenia and is admitted to hospital following a psychotic episode. She later reveals to her therapist that she has not been taking her medication as it interferes with her ability to paint. Her mother Michelle and father John are both very supportive, but when Rain returns to school, she is disowned by her friends who make fun of her mental illness. However a new boy, Caleb, notices her and they begin hanging out.

One night while having a bad dream, Rain sees a vision of her teacher Ms McConnell (also her next-door neighbour) dancing with a small child. She wakes up and looks through her bedroom window into her attic window, and sees the girl quickly snatched from view.

The next morning, Rain and John visit Ms McConnell's and she allows them to search the attic. They find nothing but dolls and mannequins that she claims belonged to her late grandmother. Rain tells Caleb what she saw and he believes her. They later break into her home to find the girl, but are unsuccessful.

Rain and Caleb search for missing children online and find a missing girl called Malia who Rain says looks just like the girl she saw in the attic. He later learns of Rain's illness and she opens up to him. Michelle starts to question if Caleb is real, or if he is a figment of Rain's imagination.

Rain and Caleb attempt to search Ms McConnell's home again but she hears them break a window and calls the police. When John finds out, he gets angry and confronts Rain, insisting she take a dose of her meds. She taunts him by shoving several of her pills in her mouth. When he tries to force her to spit them out, she bites his finger, and he slaps her.

The following evening, Rain and Caleb kiss for the first time in her living room. Michelle surprises them, confirming to Rain that he is real, but then he leaves abruptly. The next day at school, she sees Caleb is absent and believes she actually invented him in her mind.

Rain goes to see her therapist but she is not in her office. She then returns home where she suffers a mental breakdown. Michelle tries to comfort her but Rain lashes out. John then reveals Michelle died three years ago and her presence since then has been Rain's imagination.

Hysterical, Rain breaks into Ms McConnell’s home again and makes a further investigation of the attic. She has a vision of her mother and converses with her spirit. Ms McConnell arrives home and sits down to eat dinner. As Rain tries to sneak out, she sees that the basement door is now locked, but she is able to steal the keys and unlock the door.

Rain finds Malia locked in a cage in the basement. When they hear Ms McConnell come down to investigate, she hides in the cage with the little girl. Ms McConnell tells Rain she wants to help her, will not report her to the police, and that Malia is not real.

Rain does not know what to believe, but at that moment, Caleb appears and subdues Ms McConnell, giving the girls a chance to escape. John arrives and confirms to Rain that Malia is real, and that she was right all along. Caleb then emerges from the garage and is also confirmed to be real.

Weeks later, Rain is recovering; her new medication is working and she has stopped having as many hallucinations. She and John visit Michelle's grave. Later, as Rain is falling asleep in her room, a vision of Michelle sleeps beside her, reassuring her that her mother is forever with her in her memory.

== Cast ==
- Madison Iseman as Rain Burroughs
- Katherine Heigl as Michelle Burroughs, Rain's mother
- Israel Broussard as Caleb
- Eugenie Bondurant as Dani McConnell
- Harry Connick Jr. as John Burroughs, Rain's father

== Production ==
Principal photography began in April 2019 in Tampa, Florida, and St. Petersburg, Florida. In November 2019, it was announced that the film was in post-production.

It was filmed under the title I Saw a Man with Yellow Eyes.

== Release ==
The film was released on February 12, 2021, in selected theaters and digitally. It grossed at least $170,000 domestically after three weekends, after playing at 120 theaters.

== Home media ==
It was released on DVD on February 16, 2021.

== Reception ==
The film has an approval rating of 50% on Rotten Tomatoes based on 16 reviews, with an average rating of 5/10.

Cath Clarke, writing for The Guardian, gave the film a score of 3 stars out of 5, saying that it, "combin[es] a well-intentioned drama about teenage mental illness with a lurid potboiler," though praised Eugenie Bondurant's performance, describing it as "creepy" and "the highlight of the film." She concluded, "Fear of Rain won’t be winning any awards for mental health awareness with its silly hash of psychology, packaging up illness to fit the schlock’n’shock of the story. But there are a couple of ludicrous twists at the end that make it very watchable."

Noel Murray, writing for the Los Angeles Times, praised the cast performances and said that Rain is "legitimately characterized as a person with schizophrenia, persistently plagued by voices and visions," but wrote, "Landon struggles to generate much tension from her plot, which frequently feels contrived. The story jerks its protagonist (and its audience) through several dark and heartbreaking moments, before inevitably landing on a final confrontation with an outcome that’s not too hard to predict". He concluded: "This is ultimately a nuanced character study, awkwardly wedged into a run-of-the-mill genre picture."

David Robb of Slant Magazine gave the film a score of 1 star out of 4, saying that the film portrays mental illness "with all the nuance and insight of Jared Leto in Suicide Squad," and described its approach as being "too cloying and condescending to even be enjoyed as exploitation."
