= Sottomarini =

Single by Mahmood

from the album Nei letti degli altri (Digital edition only)
- Released: 21 February 2025
- Genre: R&B; pop
- Length: 2:53
- Label: Island
- Songwriter: Alessandro Mahmoud
- Producer: Davide Simonetta

Mahmood singles chronology
"Ra ta ta" (2024)	"Sottomarini" (2025)

"Sottomarini" (transl. Submarines) is a song written and recorded by Italian singer Mahmood, released as a single on 21 February 2025 and later included on the digital reissue of the singer's third studio album Nei letti degli altri. It was written by Mahmood and produced by Davide Simonetta.

== Preview ==
The song was previewed on 15 February 2025 during the Sanremo Music Festival 2025.

== Charts ==
Chart performance for "Sottomarini"
Chart (2025)	Peak position
Italy (FIMI)	58
