= Black Nirvana =

Single by Elodie

from the album Mi ami mi odi
- Released: 31 May 2024
- Genre: Dance pop
- Length: 3:04
- Label: Island
- Songwriters: Elodie Di Patrizi; Jacopo Ettorre; Federica Abbate; Eugenio Maimone; Federico Mercuri; Giordano Cremona; Leonardo Grillotti
- Producer: ITACA

Elodie singles chronology
| "Soli a Milano" (2024) | "Black Nirvana" (2024) | "Io vorrei 2024" (2024) |

Music video
- "Black Nirvana" on YouTube

"Black Nirvana" is a song co-written and recorded by Italian singer Elodie. It was released by Island Records on 31 May 2024 as the lead single from the singer's fifth studio album, Mi ami mi odi.

It was written by Elodie, Federica Abbate and Jacopo Ettorre and composed by Leonardo Grillotti, Federico Mercuri, Giordano Cremona and Eugenio Maimone, and produced by the collective ITACA. The song peaked at number seven on the Italian singles chart.

== Music video ==
The music video for the song, directed by Attilio Cusani, was released on YouTube on the same day.

== Charts ==
=== Weekly charts ===
Weekly chart performance for "Black Nirvana"
| Chart (2024) | Peak position |
|---|---|
| Italy (FIMI) | 7 |
| Italy Airplay (EarOne) | 2 |

=== Year-end charts ===
2024 year-end chart performance for "Black Nirvana"
| Chart (2024) | Position |
|---|---|
| Italy (FIMI) | 45 |

== Certifications ==
Certifications for "Black Nirvana"
| Region | Certification | Certified units/sales |
|---|---|---|
| Italy (FIMI) | Platinum | 100,000^{‡} |
^{‡} Sales+streaming figures based on certification alone.
