= Dieci (song) =

Single by Annalisa

from the album Nuda10
- Released: 3 March 2021
- Genre: Pop
- Length: 3:18
- Label: Warner Music Italy
- Songwriters: Annalisa Scarrone; Paolo Antonacci; Jacopo Matteo Luca D'Amico; Davide Simonetta
- Producer: d.whale

Annalisa singles chronology
"Jingle Bell Rock" (2020)	"Dieci" (2021)	"Movimento lento" (2021)

Music video
- "Dieci" on YouTube

"Dieci" ("Ten") is a song co-written and recorded by Italian singer Annalisa. It was released by Warner Music Italy on 3 March 2021 as the lead single from the reissue of her seventh studio album Nuda10.

The song was written by Annalisa with co-writing contribution by Davide Simonetta, Paolo Antonacci and Dargen D'Amico and produced by Simonetta.

The song served as Annalisa's entry for the Sanremo Music Festival 2021, the 71st edition of Italy's musical festival which doubles also as a selection of the act for Eurovision Song Contest, where it placed 7th in the grand final. "Dieci" peaked at number 7 on the Italian FIMI Singles Chart and was certified platinum in Italy.

== Background ==
The song, written during the 2020 lockdown due to the COVID-19 pandemic, talks about the singer's love for music. During an interview, Annalisa said: "My song is called Dieci and it's a kind of declaration of my love for music. It's the story of this love that doesn't want to end, so it clings to the last times which are never the last. At the same time there is obviously everything I feel in this moment, the determination, the desire not to give up, to start over and also the desire to share my music with people, which I have been doing for ten years".

== Music video ==
The music video for the song was released on YouTube on 3 March 2021, to accompany the single's release. Directed by Giacomo Triglia, it stars Annalisa and actor Riccardo Mandolini.

== Live performances ==
On 24 April 2021 Annalisa performed the song during the sixth show of the 20th season of Amici di Maria De Filippi.

== Track listing ==
Digital download
No.	Title	Length
1.	"Dieci"	3:18

== Charts ==
=== Weekly charts ===
Chart performance for "Dieci"
Chart (2021)	Peak position
Italy (FIMI)	7
Italy Airplay (EarOne)	7
San Marino (SMRRTV Top 50)	19

=== Year-end charts ===
Year-end chart performance for "Dieci"
Chart (2021)	Position
Italy (FIMI)	59

== Certifications ==
Region	Certification	Certified units/sales
Italy (FIMI)	2× Platinum	140,000^{‡}
^{‡} Sales+streaming figures based on certification alone.
