= Bye Bye (album) =

Studio album by Annalisa
- Released: 16 February 2018
- Recorded: 2016
- Genre: Electropop
- Length: 44:00
- Language: Italian
- Label: Warner
- Producer: Michele Canova

Annalisa chronology
Se avessi un cuore (2016)	Bye Bye (2018)	Nuda (2020)

Singles from Bye Bye
- 1. "Direzione la vita" Released: 13 October 2017; 2. "Il mondo prima di te" Released: 6 February 2018; 3. "Bye Bye" Released: 20 April 2018; 4. "Un domani" Released: 24 August 2018

Bye Bye is the sixth studio album by Italian singer-songwriter Annalisa, released on 16 February 2018 through Warner Music Italy.

== Promotion ==
The release of Bye Bye was anticipated by two singles. The first was "Direzione la vita" while the second was "Il mondo prima di te", published on 6 February 2018 and ranked third at Sanremo Music Festival 2018. Through the digital pre-order of the album "Bianco nero e grigio", the promotional single of the album, was made available for listening.

== Track listing ==
No.	Title	Lyrics	Music	Length
1.	"Bye Bye"	Annalisa Scarrone; Daniele Lazzarin; Patrizio Simonini	Scarrone; Lazzarin; Simonini	2:56
2.	"Direzione la vita"	Scarrone; Alex Andrea Vella; Davide Simonetta	Scarrone; Vella; Simonetta	3:30
3.	"Il mondo prima di te"	Scarrone; Alessandro Raina; Simonetta	Scarrone; Raina; Simonetta	3:38
4.	"Bianco nero e grigio"	Alice Bisi; Fabio Gargiulo; Fabrizio Martorelli	Bisi; Gargiulo; Martorelli	3:49
5.	"Le parole non mentono"	Marco Canigiula; Francesco Sponta	Canigiula; Marco Di Martino; Chiara Stroia	3:17
6.	"Un domani" (featuring Mr. Rain)	Scarrone; Mattia Balardi; Lazzarin; Mario Fanizzi	Fanizzi	3:43
7.	"Illuminami"	Antonio Maiello	Maiello; Enrico Palmosi; Sabatino Salvati	3:21
8.	"Ogni festa"	Lorenzo Urciullo; Christopher Joseph Burkich; Michele Canova	Burkich; Canova	3:00
9.	"Dimenticherai"	Jacopo Ettorre; Alma-Sofia Miettinen; Canova	Miettinen; Canova	3:30
10.	"Il prossimo weekend"	Scarrone; Simonetta	Scarrone; Simonetta	3:27
11.	"Specchio"	Scarrone; Lazzarin; Simonini	Scarrone; Lazzarin; Simonini	3:24
12.	"Superare"	Davide Petrella	Scarrone; Petrella	3:45
13.	"Dov'è che si va"	Scarrone; Paolo Antonacci; Placido Salamone	Scarrone; Antonacci; Salamone	3:18
Total length:				44:00

== Charts ==
Chart (2018)	Peak position
Italian Albums (FIMI)	2
Swiss Albums (Schweizer Hitparade)	92

== Certifications ==
Certifications for Bye Bye
Region	Certification	Certified units/sales
Italy (FIMI)	Platinum	50,000^{‡}
^{‡} Sales+streaming figures based on certification alone.
