= Time Is Up (film) =

2021 film by Elisa Amoruso

- Theatrical release poster
- Directed by: Elisa Amoruso
- Screenplay by: Elisa Amoruso; Patrizia Fiorellini; Lorenzo Ura
- Story by: Marco Belardi; Patrizia Fiorellini
- Produced by: Marco Belardi
- Starring: Bella Thorne; Benjamin Mascolo
- Cinematography: Martina Cocco
- Edited by: Irene Vecchio
- Music by: Alberto Bof
- Production companies: Lotus Production; Rai Cinema
- Distributed by: 01 Distribution
- Release dates: 9 September 2021 (United States); 25 October 2021 (Italy)
- Running time: 108 minutes
- Country: Italy
- Language: English
- Box office: $301,388

Time Is Up is a 2021 English-language Italian romantic drama film directed by Elisa Amoruso from a screenplay she co-wrote with Lorenzo Ura and Patrizia Fiorellini. The film stars Bella Thorne, Benjamin Mascolo, Nikolay Moss, Roberto Davide and Sebastiano Pigazzi.

The film was released in the United States on 9 September 2021 by Voltage Pictures and in Italy on 25 October 2021 by 01 Distribution. It was panned by critics and audience for the acting and screenplay but was praised for its music.

A sequel titled Game of Love, was released in 2022.

== Plot ==
Vivien is a high school student who loves math and physics. Steve is the clean-cut star of the high school swim team, and Vivien's boyfriend, while both are quite affluent.

Roy, on the other hand is poor, has many tattoos, and is underperforming on the same swim team. He is warned that if he does not improve his times, he will miss out on both an upcoming meet in Rome in two weeks' time, which he needs for a college scholarship. Both the coach and his dad pressure him to improve, his dad reminding him that otherwise he will have to work at his garage.

Vivien's suspicion that her mother is having an affair is confirmed when she trails her to a restaurant far from home and sees her indiscreetly with a man who is not her husband. Upset, Vivien walks by a group of teens, who take her bag and harass her. Roy, who knows them, swoops in to help. He suggests Vivien avoid this side of town to stay safe, having recognised his teammate's girlfriend.

Steve is an inattentive boyfriend. He has been disappearing without calling or texting to let Vivien know where he is. Vivien is unhappy because of Steve's inattention, constant studying and is not confident of her knowledge. Although she does go to the venue, she puts off taking her quantum physics test.

Steve has been remote with Vivien because he is in a secret relationship with Dylan, the college-aged swim coach. Roy has seen Steve and Dylan kissing in the pool shower. He hasn't said anything, nevertheless Steve threatens Roy about keeping the secret.

Going to a costume party with her best friend, Vivien comes across Roy on the dance floor. Shortly after, he gets into a fistfight defending a long-time friend, who is revealed to be the tattoo artist who started inking him at 13.

Steve and Roy are pitted against each other in the pool, and Roy beats him, thus qualifying to go with the team to Rome for the swim meet. Directly afterwards Vivien and Steve have a confrontation, he wanting to know why she was gone from the party by the time he showed, she pointing out he was again unreachable by phone. Although Vivien gives him an ultimatum about their relationship, he abruptly leaves with the team. Going home, Vivien confronts her parents, learning they separated a year ago, but were waiting to tell her once she was at college.

Distraught, she goes to Rome to surprise Steve, but ends up spending the day with Roy. They walk around the city, take out a row boat and get drunk at a hotel's bar, doing a runner. At the end of the day, they kiss in a pool. Having mixed feelings, Vivien goes back to Steve's room, only to find him in bed with the coach.

Shocked and heartbroken, Vivien runs out of the hotel with Roy chasing after her. Upset, she lashes out at him, saying hurtful things. Then, going after him to apologize into a dark street, Vivien is hit by a car.

After initial treatment by the doctors in Rome, Vivien is transported to a hospital stateside without regaining consciousness. When she wakes days later, after he plays a song they heard buskers performing in Rome, initially she has no memory of what happened in Rome. Steve lies to her that she spent the day with him, while Roy keeps his distance.

Eventually, Vivien remembers what actually happened, thanks to seeing the photos of their day in Rome. She goes to meet Roy, and they spend the night together. Newly confident in herself, she takes her physics test.

== Cast ==
- Bella Thorne as Vivien
- Benjamin Mascolo as Roy
- Sebastiano Pigazzi as Steve
- Bonnie Baddoo as Vivien's friend
- Nikolay Moss as Dylan, the swim coach
- Emma Lo Bianco as Sarah, Vivien's mother
- Giampiero Judica as Vivien's father
- Roberto Davide as Bryan, Roy's father

== Production ==
Principal photography started on 9 November 2020 and concluded on 21 December 2020 in Rome, Italy. Scenes shot in the United States were also included.

== Critical reception ==
Decider suggested that the only performer worth watching was the city of Rome itself, dubbing the rest of the film "a forgettable mess". The review from Common Sense Media suggested that the only good thing in the film was its music, with everything else an example of "what might result when a group of people with short attention spans collaborate." The review from Culture Mix suggested that the "atrocious screenplay" was further hindered by a cast that knew "how to look sullen and bored more than they know how to act."
