= Bye Bye (Annalisa song) =

Single by Annalisa

from the album Bye Bye
- Released: 20 April 2018
- Genre: Electropop
- Length: 2:56
- Label: Warner Music Italy
- Songwriters: Annalisa Scarrone; Daniele Lazzarin; Patrizio Simonini
- Producer: Michele Canova

Annalisa singles chronology
"Il mondo prima di te" (2018)	"Bye Bye" (2018)	"Un domani" (2018)

Music video
- "Bye Bye" on YouTube

"Bye Bye" is a song co-written and recorded by Italian singer Annalisa. It was released by Warner Music Italy on 20 April 2018 as the third single from her sixth studio album by the same name.

The song was written by Annalisa, Daniele Lazzarin and Patrizio Simonini, and produced by Michele Canova. It peaked at number 41 on the FIMI Singles Chart and was certified platinum in Italy.

== Music video ==
The music video for "Bye Bye", directed by YouNuts!, was first released onto YouTube on the same day. It was shot in the Corviale district of Rome.

== Charts ==
Chart performance for "Bye Bye"
Chart (2018)	Peak position
Italy (FIMI)	41

== Certifications ==
Region	Certification	Certified units/sales
Italy (FIMI)	Platinum	50,000^{‡}
^{‡} Sales+streaming figures based on certification alone.
