= Mi ami mi odi (song) =

Single by Elodie

from the album Mi ami mi odi
- Released: 4 April 2025
- Genre: Electropop
- Length: 3:31
- Label: Island
- Songwriters: Elodie Di Patrizi; Elisa Toffoli; Jacopo Ettorre; Dario Faini
- Producers: Dardust; Cripo

Elodie singles chronology
"Dimenticarsi alle 7" (2025)	"Mi ami mi odi" (2025)	"Yakuza" (2025)

Music video
- "Mi ami mi odi" on YouTube

"Mi ami mi odi" (Italian for 'You Love Me, You Hate Me') is a song co-written and recorded by Italian singer Elodie. It was released on 4 April 2025 as the fourth single from the singer's fifth studio album, Mi ami mi odi, through Island Records.

== Composition ==
It was written by Elodie, Elisa, Jacopo Ettorre, and Dardust, and produced by the latter with Cripo.

== Critical reception ==
Alessandro Alicandri of TV Sorrisi e Canzoni praised the artist's willingness to "make an ever-changing song unforgettable", appreciating the "very powerful production with experimental traits" on which she sets a text that "celebrates the female figure in the duality of feelings, sometimes opposite, that she generates in men". Alvise Salerno of All Music Italia associated the sounds with the 2023 mixtape Red Light, deeming it "a valid track" because if sung by "a Dua Lipa, make her sing it in English, and it becomes a resounding hit".

== Music video ==
The music video for the song, directed by Attilio Cusani, was released on YouTube on the same day.

== Charts ==
Weekly chart performance for "Mi ami mi odi"
Chart (2025)	Peak position
Italy (FIMI)	18
Italy Airplay (EarOne)	2

== Certifications ==
Certifications for "Mi ami mi odi"
Region	Certification	Certified units/sales
Italy (FIMI)	Gold	100,000^{‡}
^{‡} Sales+streaming figures based on certification alone.
