= Federico Rossi (singer) =

Italian singer and actor (born 1994)

- Born: 22 February 1994 (age 31); Modena, Italy
- Occupation: Singer
- Years active: 2010–present

Federico Rossi (born 22 February 1994), also known as Fede, is an Italian singer.

== Career ==
Rossi met Benjamin Mascolo online and, together with him, formed the pop duo Benji & Fede in 2010. After the initial years, the duo was signed by the major label Warner and released four albums between 2015 and 2019, all of which reached the top of the Italian charts. The duo released several successful singles, including the 2019 summer hit "Dove e quando". In 2020, the duo announced their breakup, after which both musicians began solo careers.

In April 2021, Rossi released his first solo single "Pesche", which peaked at number 46 of the Italian singles chart and was certified platinum. On 28 May 2021, he was featured in Annalisa's song "Movimento lento", which became a summer hit in Italy and was certified triple platinum. In the same year, he released his second solo single "Non è mai troppo tardi", which earned him another platinum certification, and dueted with Ana Mena in the single "Sol y mar".

Between 2022 and 2023, Rossi released the singles "Ti penso spesso", "Le Mans", "Maledetto mare", and "Fiore sulla luna".

== Discography ==
=== Solo ===
Year	Title	Peak chart positions	Certifications	Album
Year	Title	ITA	Certifications	Album
2021	"Pesche"	46	FIMI: Platinum	Non-album single
2021	"Movimento lento" (with Annalisa)	8	FIMI: 3× Platinum	Nuda10
2021	"Non è mai troppo tardi"	30	FIMI: Platinum	Non-album singles
2021	"Sol y mar" (with Ana Mena)	—		Non-album singles
2022	"Ti penso spesso"	—		Non-album singles
2022	"Le Mans"	—		Non-album singles
2023	"Maledetto mare"	—		Non-album singles
2023	"Fiore sulla luna"	—		Non-album singles
