= Tsunami (Annalisa song) =

Single by Annalisa

from the album Nuda
- Released: 4 September 2020
- Genre: Power ballad
- Length: 3:45
- Label: Warner Music Italy
- Songwriters: Annalisa Scarrone; Alessandro Raina; Davide Simonetta
- Producer: Davide Simonetta

Annalisa singles chronology
"Houseparty" (2020)	"Tsunami" (2020)	"San Lorenzo" (2020)

Music video
- "Tsunami" on YouTube

"Tsunami" is a song co-written and recorded by Italian singer Annalisa. It was released by Warner Music Italy on 4 September 2020 as the third single from her seventh studio album Nuda.

It was written by Annalisa, Davide Simonetta and Alessandro Raina, and produced by Simonetta.

The song peaked at number 83 on the FIMI Singles Chart and was certified gold in Italy.

== Music video ==
A music video to accompany the release of "Tsunami" was then released onto YouTube on 8 September 2020. The video was directed by Giacomo Triglia and shot in the Maremma Regional Park, near Alberese, Grosseto.

== Track listing ==
Digital download
No.	Title	Length
1.	"Tsunami"	3:45

== Charts ==
Chart performance for "Tsunami"
Chart (2020)	Peak position
Italy (FIMI)	83
San Marino (SMRRTV Top 50)	34

== Certifications ==
Region	Certification	Certified units/sales
Italy (FIMI)	Gold	35,000^{‡}
^{‡} Sales+streaming figures based on certification alone.
