= Tuta gold =

Single by Mahmood

from the album Nei letti degli altri
- Released: 7 February 2024
- Genre: Baile funk
- Length: 2:58
- Label: Island; Universal
- Songwriters: Alessandro Mahmood; Jacopo Ettorre; Francesco Catitti
- Producers: Madfingerz; Katoo

Mahmood singles chronology
| "Cocktail d'amore" (2023) | "Tuta gold" (2024) | "Ra ta ta" (2024) |

Music video
- "Tuta gold" on YouTube

"Tuta gold" (transl. "Golden tracksuit") is a song co-written and recorded by Italian singer Mahmood. It was released for digital download and streaming on 7 February 2024 by Island Records and Universal Music as the second single from Mahmood's third studio album, Nei letti degli altri. It was written by Mahmood with co-writing contribution by Jacopo Ettorre and Francesco Catitti.

The song was Mahmood's entry for the Sanremo Music Festival 2024, the 74th edition of Italy's musical festival which doubles also as a selection of the act for Eurovision Song Contest, where it placed 6th in the grand final.

== Music video ==
A music video to accompany the release of "Tuta gold" was first released onto YouTube on 7 February 2024. The video was directed by Attilio Cusani and shot in Rozzol Melara, Trieste.

== Charts ==
=== Weekly charts ===
Weekly chart performance for "Tuta gold"
| Chart (2024) | Peak position |
|---|---|
| Global 200 (Billboard) | 52 |
| Greece International (IFPI) | 11 |
| Italy (FIMI) | 1 |
| Italy Airplay (EarOne) | 1 |
| Lithuania (AGATA) | 44 |
| Luxembourg (Billboard) | 19 |
| Serbia Airplay (Radiomonitor) | 6 |
| Switzerland (Schweizer Hitparade) | 2 |

=== Year-end charts ===
2024 year-end chart performance for "Tuta gold"
| Chart (2024) | Position |
|---|---|
| Italy (FIMI) | 1 |

== Certifications ==
Certifications for "Tuta gold"
| Region | Certification | Certified units/sales |
|---|---|---|
| Italy (FIMI) | 5× Platinum | 500,000^{‡} |
^{‡} Sales+streaming figures based on certification alone.
