= Feeling (Elodie and Tiziano Ferro song) =

Single by Elodie and Tiziano Ferro

from the album Mi ami mi odi
- Language: Italian
- Released: 8 November 2024
- Genre: R&B
- Length: 2:40
- Label: Island; Universal; Double Trouble Club
- Songwriters: Elodie Di Patrizi; Tiziano Ferro; Federica Abbate; Jacopo Ettorre; Pietro Paroletti
- Producer: Golden Years

Elodie singles chronology
"Ti voglio" (2024)	"Feeling" (2024)	"Dimenticarsi alle 7" (2025)

Tiziano Ferro singles chronology
"Abbiamo vinto già" (2023)	"Feeling" (2024)	"Cuore rotto" (2025)

Music video
- "Feeling" on YouTube

"Feeling" is a song written and recorded by Italian singers Elodie and Tiziano Ferro. The song was released on 8 November 2024 through Island Records and Universal Music Italy as the second single from Elodie's fifth studio album, Mi ami mi odi.

== Composition ==
The song was written by the two singers with co-writing contribution by Federica Abbate and Jacopo Ettorre, and produced by Golden Years. In a press statement, Ferro talked about the meaning of the song, stating that it "explores human psychology. 'Feeling' is that instinctive spark that drives us. The song represents a kind of deep exploration of a complex situation".

== Critical reception ==
Ambra Ciafoni of All Music Italia writes that it is a "pure Tiziano style song" appreciating the union of the two voices in the track, deeming Ferro's voice "with lots of modulations and new sounds".

In a less enthusiastic review, Mattia Marzi of Rockol wrote that the song is "not quite up to expectations" pointing out the presence of seven authors in writing a song on the theme of betrayal, in which the two singers list "all the times they caught their respective imaginary partners in the act". Marzi was not impressed by Ferro's choice in re-proposing a new "Ti voglio bene" (2004) although "at that time Ferro was 24 years old. Today he is 44, and perhaps going back to playing with those sounds may be risky: but then again, he has been trying to regain that post-adolescent dimension for years".

== Music video ==
The music video, directed by brothers Luca and Alessandro Morelli, was released in conjunction with the song's release through Elodie's YouTube channel. The video was shot at G&J Grip Studios in Los Angeles.

== Charts ==
Chart (2024)	Peak position
Italy (FIMI)	9
Italy Airplay (EarOne)	1

== Certifications ==
Certifications for "Feeling"
Region	Certification	Certified units/sales
Italy (FIMI)	Gold	100,000^{‡}
^{‡} Sales+streaming figures based on certification alone.
