= Direzione la vita =

Single by Annalisa

from the album Bye Bye
- Released: 13 October 2017
- Genre: Dance pop
- Length: 3:29
- Label: Warner Music Italy
- Songwriters: Annalisa Scarrone; Alex Andrea Vella; Davide Simonetta
- Producer: Michele Canova

Annalisa singles chronology
"Tutto per una ragione" (2017)	"Direzione la vita" (2017)	"Il mondo prima di te" (2018)

Music video
- "Direzione la vita" on YouTube

"Direzione la vita" (lit. 'Direction life') is a song co-written and recorded by Italian singer Annalisa. It was released by Warner Music Italy on 13 October 2017 as the lead single from her sixth studio album Bye Bye.

The song was written by Annalisa, Davide Simonetta and Raige, and produced by Michele Canova. It peaked at number 43 on the FIMI Singles Chart and was certified platinum in Italy.

== Music video ==
The music video for "Direzione la vita", directed by Mauro Russo, was first released onto YouTube on 19 October 2017.

== Track listing ==
Digital download
No.	Title	Length
1.	"Direzione la vita"	3:29

== Charts ==
Chart performance for "Direzione la vita"
Chart (2017)	Peak position
Italy (FIMI)	43

== Certifications ==
Region	Certification	Certified units/sales
Italy (FIMI)	Platinum	50,000^{‡}
^{‡} Sales+streaming figures based on certification alone.
