= Un domani =

Single by Annalisa featuring Mr. Rain

from the album Bye Bye
- Released: 24 August 2018
- Genre: Trap-pop; R&B
- Length: 3:43
- Label: Warner Music Italy
- Songwriters: Annalisa Scarrone; Mattia Balardi; Mario Fanizzi; Daniele Lazzarin
- Producer: Michele Canova

Annalisa singles chronology
"Bye Bye" (2018)	"Un domani" (2018)	"Avocado Toast" (2019)

Mr. Rain singles chronology
"Ops" (2018)	"Un domani" (2018)	"La somma" (2019)

Music video
- "Un domani" on YouTube

"Un domani" is a song co-written and recorded by Italian singer Annalisa with featured vocals by Italian rapper Mr. Rain. It was released by Warner Music Italy on 24 August 2018 as the fourth single from Annalisa's sixth studio album Bye Bye.

== Composition ==
The song was written by Annalisa, Mr. Rain, Mario Fanizzi and Daniele Lazzarin, and produced by Michele Canova. The lyrics deal with the theme of the awareness of the beginning of a new journey, of questioning everything and understanding the milestones of the new life; specifically it tells about the end of a love affair and about also letting the partner live his own life, as explained by Annalisa herself:

"We close direct, explicit, without equivocation: the things we live are these, because "I'm sorry but there will be no tomorrow," as I say between the stanzas. So if we assess that a situation is no longer right for us, then let us hasten to say enough and move on. That there is only one truth we can count on, and that is, 'How good it feels to wake up' free."

A remixed version of the song was included on the re-release of Mr. Rain's second album, Butterfly Effect.

== Music video ==
The music video for "Un domani", directed by Enea Colombi, was first released onto YouTube on 29 August 2018. It was shot at the marble quarries of Carrara.

== Personnel ==
Credits adapted from Tidal.

- Michele Canova Iorfida – producer, keyboards, mixer, rhythm computer programmer
- Mario Fanizzi – composer, lyricist
- Annalisa Scarrone – lyricist, vocal arranger, vocals
- Daniele Lazzarin – lyricist
- Mattia Balardi – lyricist, featured artist
- Tim Pierce – guitar
- Patrizio Simonini – keyboards programmer, mixer, pre-production, rhythm programmer
- Antonio Baglio – masterer
- Alex Alessandroni Jr – piano, rhodes solo, synthesizer

== Charts ==
Chart performance for "Un domani"
Chart (2018)	Peak position
Italy (FIMI)	36

== Certifications ==
Region	Certification	Certified units/sales
Italy (FIMI)	Platinum	50,000^{‡}
^{‡} Sales+streaming figures based on certification alone.
