= Lvnar =

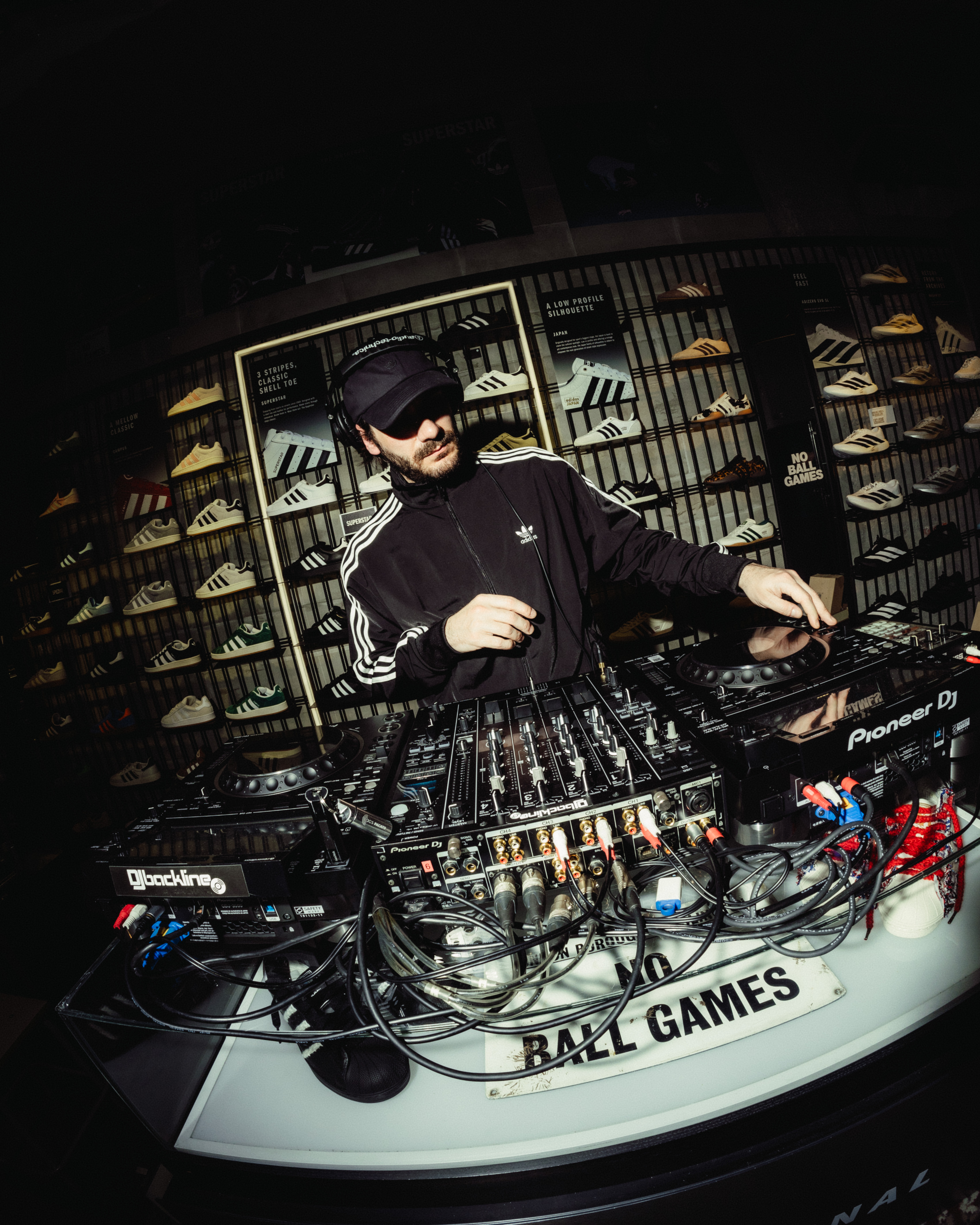
- Lvnar performing at Adidas No Ball Games in Milan (2025)

Background information
- Born: Marco Ferrario; 1989 (age 36–37); Busto Arsizio, Italy
- Origin: Italy
- Genres: Hip hop, electronic
- Occupations: Record producer, DJ
- Years active: 2010–present

Marco Ferrario (born 1989), known professionally as Lvnar, is an Italian record producer and DJ. He is best known for his long-term collaboration with Mecna, with whom he co-produced the platinum-certified album Mentre nessuno guarda (2020) by the FIMI, and the album Stupido amore (2023), where he served as co-producer.

He has also produced for Elodie (including "Lontano da qui" from the mixtape Red Light, and the tracks "1 ora" and "Di nuovo" from the album Mi ami mi odi), and contributed to works by Egreen, Dargen D'Amico, Tredici Pietro, and Mahmood.

== Career ==
Active since the early 2010s in the Italian hip hop and electronic scene, Lvnar first gained recognition for his production work alongside Mecna and Iamseife. Profiles and interviews describe him as a producer and DJ active between urban and electronic music, with a focus on sound direction and cohesive aesthetic identity.

== Selected production credits ==
- 2015 – Egreen, Beats & Hate – co-production of the album
- 2018 – Mecna, Laska – production contributions
- 2020 – Mecna, Mentre nessuno guarda – co-production (with Iamseife and Alessandro Cianci)
- 2021 – Mecna & CoCo, "La più bella" – production
- 2022 – Mecna & CoCo feat. Sangiovanni, "Tilt" – co-production (with DJ 2P)
- 2023 – Mecna, Stupido amore – co-production of the album
- 2023 – Elodie, "Lontano da qui" (from Red Light) – production and composition
- 2024 – Click Head & Lvnar, Truth Hurts / Click Kills – co-production of the album
- 2025 – Gato Tomato & Lvnar, Satana in Cadillac – co-production of the album
- 2025 – Elodie, "1 ora" (from Mi ami mi odi) – production and composition
- 2025 – Elodie, "Di nuovo" (from Mi ami mi odi) – production

== Live activity ==
- Member of Mecna's live band (DJ/synth, keyboards) for several tours and festivals between 2018 and 2022.
