= Il mondo prima di te =

- Limited edition vinyl cover

Single by Annalisa

from the album Bye Bye
- Released: 6 February 2018
- Genre: Pop
- Length: 3:38
- Label: Warner Music Italy
- Songwriters: Annalisa Scarrone; Alessandro Raina; Davide Simonetta
- Producer: Michele Canova

Annalisa singles chronology
"Direzione la vita" (2017)	"Il mondo prima di te" (2018)	"Bye Bye" (2018)

Music video
- "Il mondo prima di te" on YouTube

"Il mondo prima di te" (lit. 'The world before you') is a song co-written and recorded by Italian singer Annalisa. It was released by Warner Music Italy on 6 February 2018 as the second single from her sixth studio album Bye Bye.

It was written by Annalisa with co-writing contribution by Davide Simonetta and Alessandro Raina, and produced by Michele Canova. The song served as Annalisa's entry for the Sanremo Music Festival 2018, the 68th edition of Italy's musical festival which doubles also as a selection of the act for Eurovision Song Contest, where it placed third in the grand final. "Il mondo prima di te" peaked at number 3 on the FIMI Singles Chart and was certified platinum in Italy.

== Music video ==
A music video to accompany the release of "Il mondo prima di te" was first released onto YouTube on 7 February 2021. The video was directed by YouNuts! and shot in Lanzarote.

== Personnel ==
Credits adapted from Tidal.

- Michele Canova Iorfida – producer, keyboards, mixer, rhythm programmer
- Alessandro Raina – composer
- Annalisa Scarrone – composer, lyricist, vocals, vocal arranger
- Davide Simonetta – composer, lyricist
- Tim Pierce – guitar
- Patrizio Simonini – keyboards programmer, mixer, pre-production, rhythm programmer
- Antonio Baglio – masterer
- Alex Alessandroni Jr – piano, rhodes solo, synthesizer

== Track listing ==
Digital download
No.	Title	Length
1.	"Il mondo prima di te"	3:38

== Charts ==
Chart performance for "Il mondo prima di te"
Chart (2018)	Peak position
Italy (FIMI)	3
Italy Airplay (EarOne)	3
Switzerland (Schweizer Hitparade)	71

== Certifications ==
Region	Certification	Certified units/sales
Italy (FIMI)	Platinum	50,000^{‡}
^{‡} Sales+streaming figures based on certification alone.
