= Eugenie Bondurant =

American actress

- Born: 27 April 1961 (age 65); New Orleans, Louisiana
- Occupation: Actress
- Years active: 1992–present
- Spouse: Paul Wilborn

Eugenie Bondurant (born April 27, 1961 in New Orleans, Louisiana) is an American actress, singer and model.

== Early life and education ==
Bondurant studied at the University of Alabama She was spotted on the streets of her hometown by a model scout, which launched her career in the entertainment industry.

== Career ==
She modeled on runways in New York City and Paris. It was in Los Angeles that she landed her first television role as Luna on the 1992 series Lady Boss. This was followed by other appearances in various television series, which include Frasier (1993), Something Wilder (1995) and Arli$$ (1996). She has also acted in a number of films, such as Mel Taybach in Saints and Sinners (1994), as Natalia in Sorority House Vampires (1998), as Cherry in Patsy (2008) and as Tigris in The Hunger Games: Mockingjay - Part 2 (2015). Most recently she appeared in Werewolf by Night, as one of the hunters to compete for the Bloodstone.

Since 2004 she has also worked as an acting coach and is a member of the Patel Conservatory. From 2008 to 2009 she earned the Meisner Teaching Certification at the True Acting Institute. Beginning in 2005 she has been a cabaret singer alongside Paul Wilborn and Blue Roses in the American Songbook Series. She was also a founder of the Radio Theater Project, launched in 2009.

Bondurant was a guest on the first episode of David Downing's show Oh-Yeah.

== Personal life ==
She is married to Paul Wilborn. She is currently a resident of Tampa Bay.

== Filmography ==
=== Film ===
Year	Title	Role	Notes
1994	Saints and Sinners	Mel Taybach	
1996	Space Truckers	Bio-Mechanical-Warrior	
1998	Sorority House Vampires	Natalia	
1999	Fight Club	Weeping Woman	
2004	Donald and Dot Clock Found Dead in Their Home	Dot	
2008	The Year of Getting to Know Us		
2008	Patsy	Cherry	
2015	The Hunger Games: Mockingjay – Part 2	Tigris Snow	
2017	Tiny Bacteria	Martha Gelhorn	Short film
2017	The Knock	Susan	Short film
2019	Darlin’	Mona	
2020	Longer	Joanne	Short film
2021	Fear of Rain	Dani McConnell	
2021	The Conjuring: The Devil Made Me Do It	The Occultist	
2024	The School Duel	Principal Wigton	

=== Television ===
Year	Title	Role	Notes
1992	Lady Boss	Luna	TV movie
1993	Frasier	Diane	TV series, one episode
1995	Something Wilder	Ursula	TV series, one episode)
1996	Arli$$	Lucille	TV series, one episode
2004	The Brooke Ellison Story	Patio Mom	TV movie
2005	Elvis	Mrs. Hughes	TV mini series
2016	NCIS: New Orleans	Marie Lovatelli	TV series, one episode
2018	Good Morning St. Pete!	Loni Deerfeather	TV short
2022	Werewolf by Night	Azarel	TV special
