= Cocktail d'amore (Mahmood song) =

- Official cover

Single by Mahmood

from the album Nei letti degli altri
- Released: 3 November 2023
- Length: 3:24
- Label: Island; Universal
- Songwriters: Alessandro Mahmoud; Alessandro Buongiorno; Paolo Alberto Monachetti; Francesco Fugazza; Marcello Grilli; Dario Faini
- Producer: Dardust

Mahmood singles chronology
"Bel Air" (2022)	"Cocktail d'amore" (2023)	"Tuta gold" (2024)

Music video
- "Cocktail d'amore" on YouTube

"Cocktail d'amore" (transl. "Love Cocktail") is a song co-written and recorded by Italian singer Mahmood. It was released for digital download and streaming on 3 November 2023 by Island Records and Universal Music Group as the lead single from the singer's third studio album Nei letti degli altri.

The song was written by Alessandro Mahmoud, Alessandro Buongiorno, Charlie Charles, Francesco Fugazza and Marcello Grilli, and produced by Dardust.

The official cover of the single was created by Belgian artist Frederik Heyman.

== Music video ==
A music video to accompany the release of "Cocktail d'amore" was first released onto YouTube on 9 November 2023. The video was directed by Torso and shot in Naples.

== Personnel ==
Credits adapted from Tidal.

- Dardust – producer
- Alessandro Buongiorno – composer
- Francesco Fugazza – composer
- Marcello Grilli – composer
- Charlie Charles – composer
- Mahmood – associated performer, author, vocals

== Charts ==
Chart performance of "Cocktail d'amore"
Chart (2023)	Peak position
Italy (FIMI)	32
Italy Airplay (EarOne)	1

== Certifications ==
Region	Certification	Certified units/sales
Italy (FIMI)	Gold	50,000^{‡}
^{‡} Sales+streaming figures based on certification alone.
