= Summer hit =

Song that is released and peaks in its popularity during summer

In the entertainment industry, a summer hit is a song that is released and peaks in its popularity during summer. In some years, a single pop song will gain widespread international popularity during the summer season, becoming that summer's definitive summer hit in many countries. Many of the best-known summer hits emerge from outside the British and American pop music industries.

The equivalent of summer hit in France is the tube de l'été (summer tube), an expression that exists since 1960s which became more commercially used by the late 1990s.

== Examples ==
=== In the US ===
- 1958: "Nel Blu Dipinto Di Blu (Volare)" – Domenico Modugno
- 2019: "Old Town Road" by Lil Nas X and Billy Ray Cyrus; "Señorita" by Shawn Mendes and Camila Cabello

=== Worldwide ===
- 1989: "Lambada" by Kaoma
- 2019: "Bad Guy" by Billie Eilish (Russia); "Con Altura" by Rosalía, J Balvin and El Guincho (Hispanic countries)

== See also ==
- Song of the summer
