= Merk & Kremont =

Pair of Italian musicians, DJs and producers

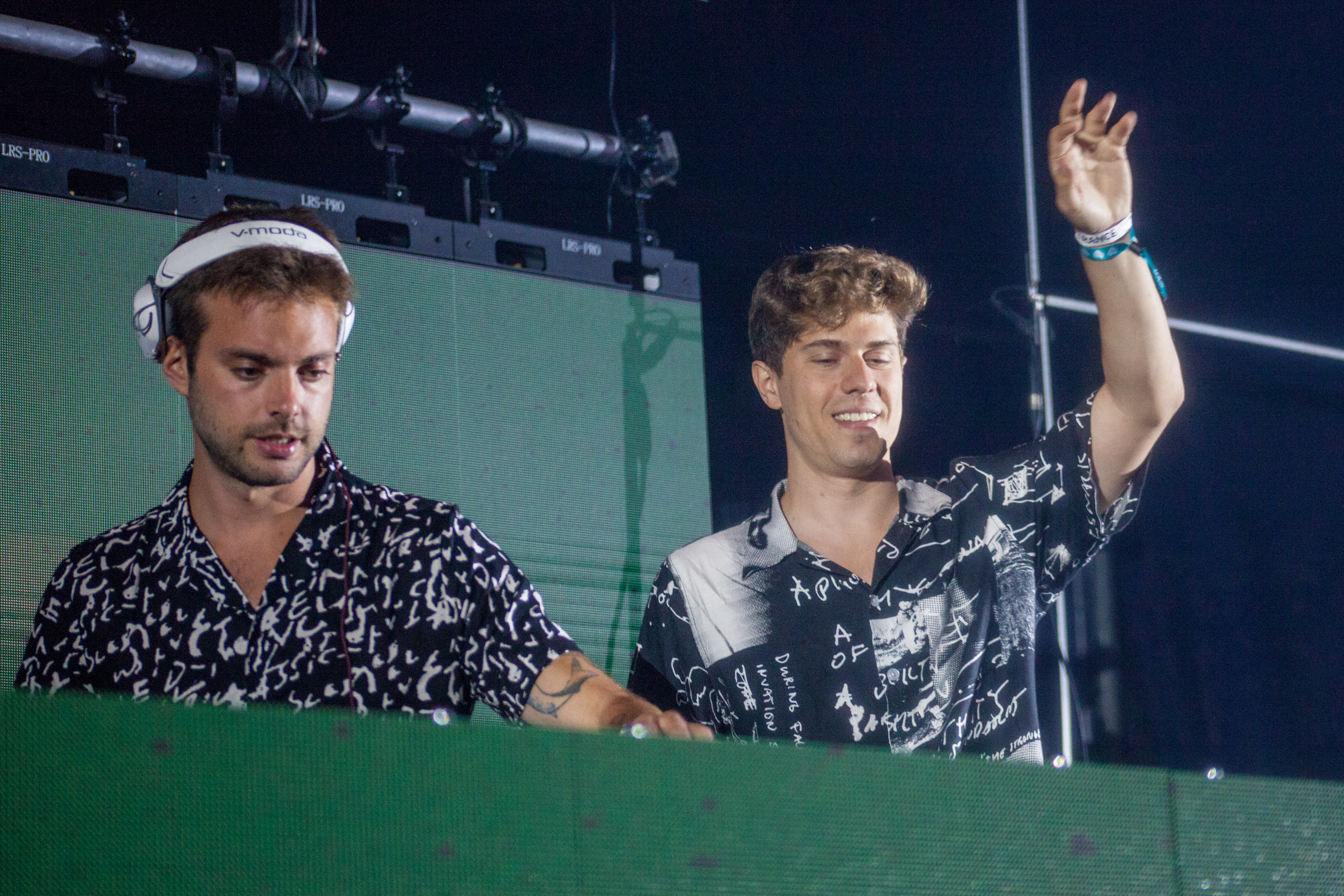
- Merk & Kremont on stage at electronic music festival Beats for Love in 2019

Background information
- Origin: Milan, Lombardy, Italy
- Genres: Dance; pop; EDM
- Years active: 2011–present
- Labels: Protocol Recordings; Spinnin' Records; Revealed Recordings; Armada Music; Future House Music; Universal Records; Island Records
- Members: Federico Mercuri; Giordano Cremona

Federico Mercuri and Giordano Cremona (both born in 1992), known professionally as Merk & Kremont, are an Italian DJ, songwriting and record production duo from Milan. In 2014, they were included in the Top 100 DJs list compiled by DJ Magazine, at No. 94.

== Awards and nominations ==
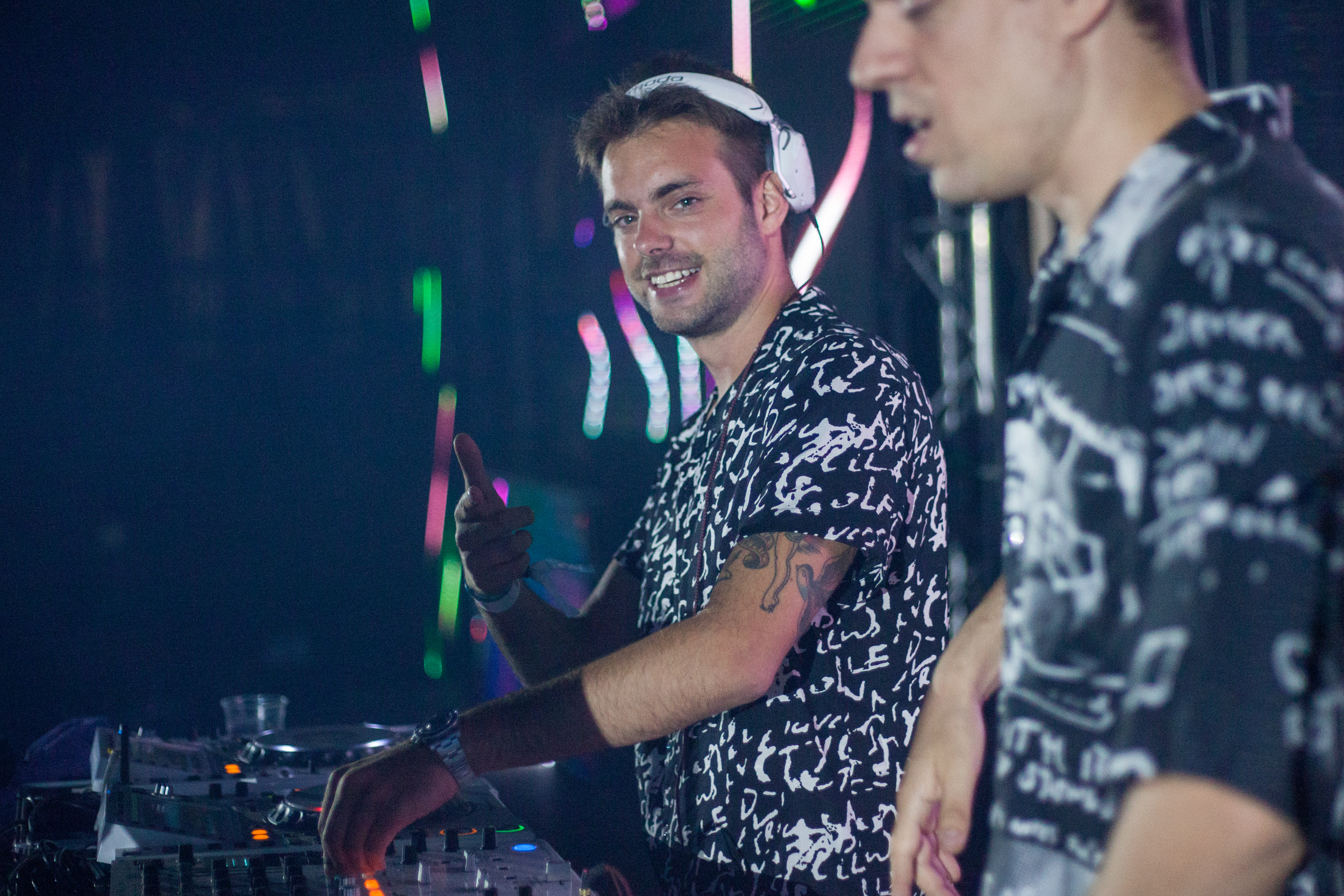
Merk (2019)

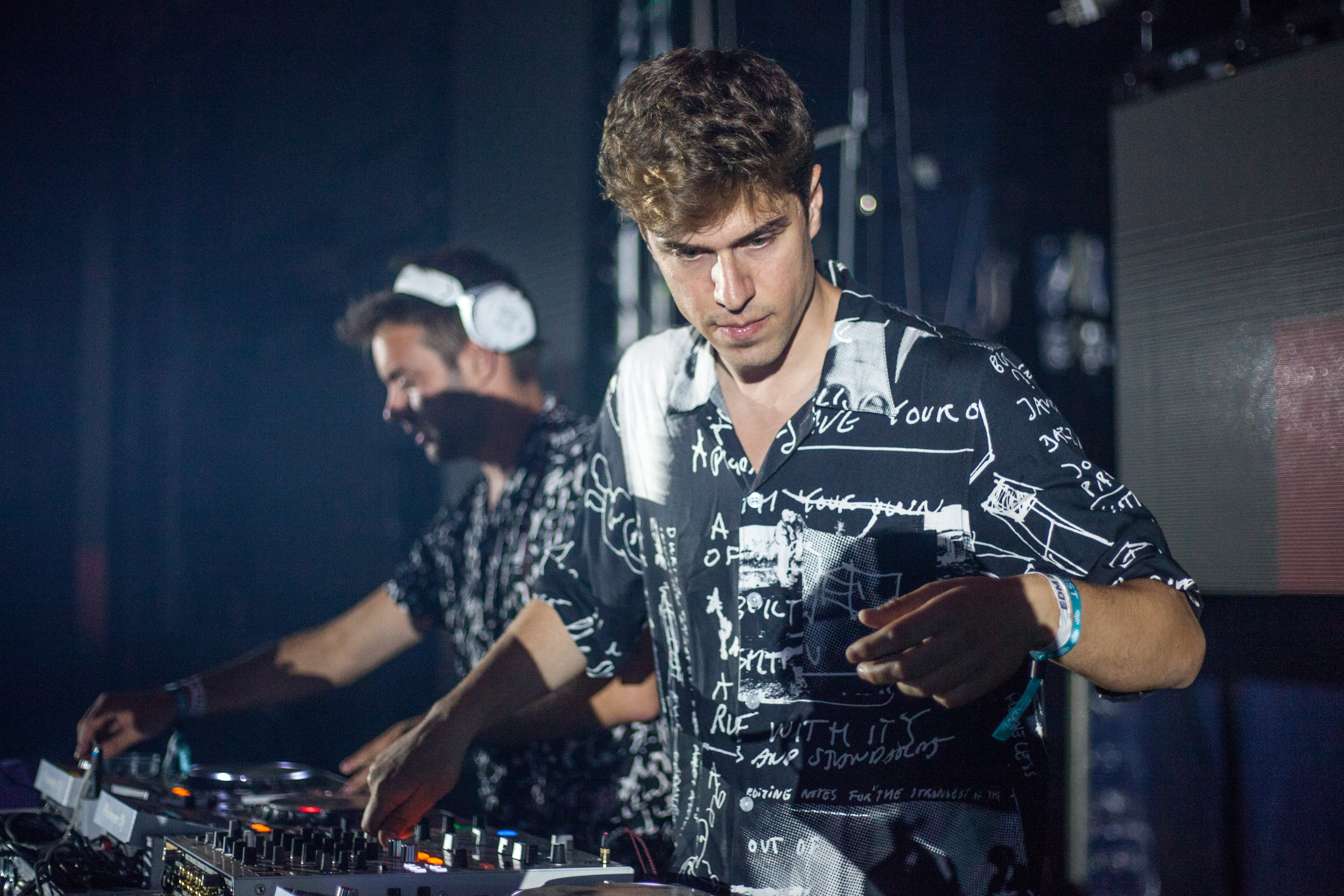
Kremont (2019)

Year	Award	Nominated work	Category	Result
2014	DJ Mag	Merk & Kremont	Top 100 DJs	No. 94
2015	DJ Mag	Merk & Kremont	Top 101-150 DJs	No. 115
2016	DJ Mag	Merk & Kremont	Top 101-150 DJs	No. 103
2017	DJ Mag	Merk & Kremont	Top 101-150 DJs	No. 145

== Discography ==
=== Singles ===
List of singles, with selected chart positions and certifications. All songs are non-album singles.
Title	Year	Peak chart position	Certifications
Title	Year	ITA	Certifications
"Underground"	2012	—	
"Tundra" (with Paris & Simo)	2013	—	
"Gear"	2013	—	
"Zunami"	2013	—	
"Charger" (with Amersy)	2014	—	
"Amen"	2014	—	
"Anubi" (with Dannic)	2014	—	
"Strike" (with Toby Green)	2014	—	
"Now or Never" (featuring Bongom)	2014	—	
"Black & White" (with Volt & State)	2015	—	
"Get Get Down"	2015	—	
"UpNDown" (with Gianluca Motta)	2015	—	
"41 Days"	2016	—	
"Give Me Some" (with Fedde Le Grand)	2016	—	
"Eyes" (with Sunstars)	2016	—	
"Don't Need No Money" (featuring Steffen Morrison)	2016	—	
"Ciao"	2016	—	
"Music" (with Dannic featuring Duane Harden)	2016	—	
"Invisible"	2017	—	
"Gang" (featuring Kris Kiss)	2017	—	
"Sad Story (Out of Luck)" (with Ady Suleiman)	2017	—	
"Turn It Around"	2017	—	
"Fire"	2018	—	
"Hands Up" (featuring DNCE)	2018	56	FIMI: Platinum
"Sushi"	2018	—	
"Gucci Fendi Prada"	2019	—	
"Kids"	2019	—	
"Numb" (with Svea featuring Ernia)	2020	—	
"Bam Bam" (with Hawk)	2020	—	
"Do It" (with Buzz Low)	2021	—	
"She's Wild" (with the Beach)	2021	—	
"U&U" (with Tim North or Rêve & Tim North)	2021	—	
"Planet in the Sky" (with Klingande featuring Mkla)	2022	—	
"Like This" (with Too Many Zooz)	2022	—	
"Big Trouble" (with Tom & Jame)	2022	—	
"Oceanica" (with Jovanotti)	2025	17	FIMI: Gold
"—" denotes releases that did not chart or were not released in that territory.

=== Remixes ===
- 2011: Andry J - My Beat (Merk & Kremont Remix) [NuZone Gears]
- 2014: Promise Land, Alicia Madison - Sun Shine Down (Merk & Kremont Remix) [Mixmash Records]
- 2014: Chris Lake, Jareth - Helium (Merk & Kremont Remix) [Ultra]
- 2014: Syn Cole - Miami 82 (Merk & Kremont Remix) [LE7ELS]
- 2014: Pink Is Punk - Pinball (Merk & Kremont Edit) [Rising Music]
- 2014: Shawnee Taylor, Helena - Levity (Merk & Kremont Remix) [Ultra]
- 2014: Nicky Romero, Anouk - Feet On The Ground (Merk & Kremont Remix) [Protocol Recordings]
- 2015: Steve Aoki, Walk off the Earth - Home We'll Go (Take My Hand) (Merk & Kremont Remix) [Ultra]
- 2016: Bob Sinclar - Someone Who Needs Me (Merk & Kremont vs Sunstars Remix) [Spinnin' Remixes]
- 2017: Sage the Gemini - Now & Later (Merk & Kremont Remix) [Atlantic]
- 2017: Avicii, Sandro Cavazza - Without You (Merk & Kremont Mix) [Universal]
- 2018: Betta Lemme - Bambola (Merk & Kremont Mix) [Ultra Music]
- 2022: RYOYA - Own It (Merk & Kremont Remix)

=== Bootleg ===
- 2016: Star Wars - Merk & Kremont Bootleg
