= Italy in the Eurovision Song Contest 2013 =

- Eurovision Song Contest 2013
- Participating broadcaster: Radiotelevisione italiana (RAI)
- Country: Italy
- Selection process: Sanremo Music Festival 2013
- Selection date: Artist: 16 February 2013; Song: 18 March 2013

Competing entry
- Song: "L'essenziale"
- Artist: Marco Mengoni
- Songwriters: Marco Mengoni; Roberto Casalino; Francesco De Benedettis

Placement
- Final result: 7th, 126 points

Participation chronology

Italy was represented at the Eurovision Song Contest 2013 with the song "L'essenziale", written by Marco Mengoni, Roberto Casalino, and Francesco De Benedettis, and performed by Mengoni himself. The Italian participating broadcaster, Radiotelevisione italiana (RAI), internally selected its entry for the contest. The artist was selected by a special committee from the participants of the Sanremo Music Festival 2013 and the song was selected by the artist. The entry placed 7th and scored 126 points in the final.

== Internal selection ==
=== Artist selection ===
On 24 January 2013, Italian broadcaster Radiotelevisione italiana (RAI) confirmed that the performer that would represent Italy at the Eurovision Song Contest 2013 would be selected by a special committee from the competing artists at the Sanremo Music Festival 2013. The competition took place between 12–16 February 2013 with the winner being selected on the last day of the festival. The competing artists in the "Big Artists" and "Newcomers" category were:

==== "Big Artists" category ====
- Almamegretta
- Annalisa Scarrone
- Chiara
- Daniele Silvestri
- Elio e le Storie Tese
- Malika Ayane
- Marco Mengoni
- Maria Nazionale
- Marta sui Tubi
- Max Gazzè
- Modà
- Raphael Gualazzi
- Simona Molinari and Peter Cincotti
- Simone Cristicchi

==== "Newcomers" category ====
- Andrea Nardinocchi
- Antonio Maggio
- Blastema
- Il Cile
- Ilaria Porceddu
- Irene Ghiotto
- Paolo Simoni
- Renzo Rubino

During the final evening of the Sanremo Music Festival 2013, Marco Mengoni was announced as the artist that would represent Italy at the Eurovision Song Contest 2013. Mengoni was also selected as the winner of the festival with the song "L'essenziale".

=== Song selection ===
On 18 March 2013, RAI confirmed that Marco Mengoni would perform his Sanremo Music Festival 2013 winning song "L'essenziale" at the Eurovision Song Contest 2013.

== At Eurovision ==
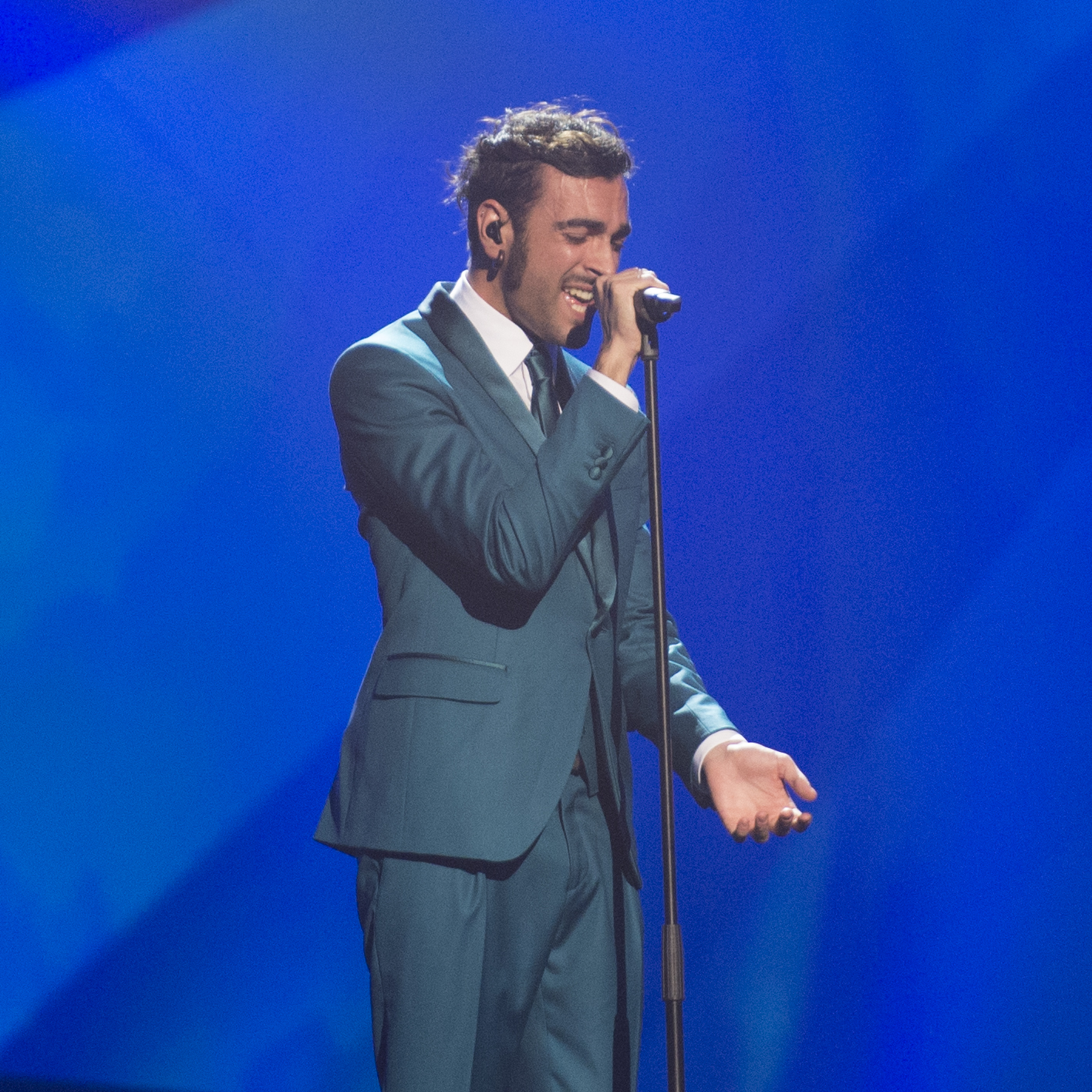
Marco Mengoni at the final dress rehearsal in Malmö.

As a member of the "Big Five", Italy automatically qualified for a place in the final, to be held on 18 May 2013. In addition to their participation in the final, Italy was assigned to vote in the first semi-final on 14 May 2013.

During the Italian delegation's press conference on 15 May, Italy was allocated to perform in the second half of the final. In the final, the producers of the show decided that Italy would perform 23rd, following Ukraine and preceding Norway. Italy placed 7th in the final and scored 126 points.

In Italy, only the first semi-final was aired on Rai 5, commentated by Federica Gentile, while the final was aired on Rai 2 and Rai HD, with commentary by Filippo Solibello, Marco Ardemagni and Natascha Lusenti.

The national jury that provided 50% of the Italian vote in the first semi-final and the final consisted of five journalists: Paolo Giordano, Gianni Sibilla, Luca Dondoni, Fabrizio Basso and Luigi Bolognini. The Italian spokesperson in the grand final was Federica Gentile.

=== Voting ===
==== Points awarded to Italy ====
Points awarded to Italy (Final)
Score	Country
12 points	Albania; Spain; Switzerland
10 points	Austria; France; Macedonia
8 points	Croatia; Malta; Slovenia
7 points	
6 points	Belgium; Cyprus; Greece; Montenegro
5 points	
4 points	Serbia; San Marino
3 points	
2 points	Georgia
1 point	Armenia; Romania

==== Points awarded by Italy ====
Points awarded by Italy (Semi-final 1)
Score	Country
12 points	Ukraine
10 points	Lithuania
8 points	Moldova
7 points	Belarus
6 points	Denmark
5 points	Estonia
4 points	Russia
3 points	Serbia
2 points	Austria
1 point	Netherlands

Points awarded by Italy (Final)
Score	Country
12 points	Denmark
10 points	Malta
8 points	Norway
7 points	Greece
6 points	Lithuania
5 points	Ukraine
4 points	Moldova
3 points	Hungary
2 points	Spain
1 point	Romania

===== Detailed voting results =====
Televoting results from Italy (Semi-final 1)
R/O	Country	Percentage	Rank	Points (Televote)		
R/O	Country	01	Rank	Austria	1.3%	16
02	Estonia	2.5%	11			
03	Slovenia	1.5%	14			
04	Croatia	2.4%	12			
05	Denmark	4.3%	5	6		
06	Russia	4.1%	6	5		
07	Ukraine	42.3%	1	12		
08	Netherlands	2.9%	9	2		
09	Montenegro	2.6%	10	1		
10	Lithuania	5.7%	3	8		
11	Belarus	3.4%	7	4		
12	Moldova	15.5%	2	10		
13	Ireland	2.2%	13			
14	Cyprus	1.5%	15			
15	Belgium	3%	8	3		
16	Serbia	4.8%	4	7		

Televoting results from Italy (Final)
R/O	Country	Percentage	Rank	Points (Televote)		
R/O	Country	01	Rank	France	0.52%	25
02	Lithuania	2.27%	10	1		
03	Moldova	13.79%	2	10		
04	Finland	1.04%	20			
05	Spain	1.51%	16			
06	Belgium	0.98%	21			
07	Estonia	0.95%	22			
08	Belarus	1.46%	17			
09	Malta	3.07%	7	4		
10	Russia	5.01%	5	6		
11	Germany	1.20%	18			
12	Armenia	1.60%	14			
13	Netherlands	1.64%	13			
14	Romania	23.20%	1	12		
15	United Kingdom	0.80%	24			
16	Sweden	0.84%	23			
17	Hungary	2.93%	8	3		
18	Denmark	3.20%	6	5		
19	Iceland	1.09%	19			
20	Azerbaijan	2.47%	9	2		
21	Greece	11.94%	4	7		
22	Ukraine	13.23%	3	8		
23	Italy					
24	Norway	1.77%	12			
25	Georgia	1.95%	11			
26	Ireland	1.54%	15			
