= Prontoacorrere =

#prontoacorrere

Studio album by Marco Mengoni
- Released: 19 March 2013
- Genre: Pop; rock
- Length: 53:58
- Label: Sony Music
- Producer: Michele Canova

Marco Mengoni chronology
Solo 2.0 (2011)	#prontoacorrere (2013)	Parole in circolo (2015)

Singles from #prontoacorrere
- 1. "L'essenziale" Released: 13 February 2013; 2. "Pronto a correre" Released: 19 April 2013; 3. "Non passerai" Released: 23 August 2013

#prontoacorrere is the second studio album by Italian singer Marco Mengoni, released by Sony Music Italy on 19 March 2013 and produced by Michele Canova.

The album was a commercial success in Italy, debuting at number one on the FIMI Albums Chart and being certified triple platinum for sales exceeding 150,000 units. Its leading single, "L'essenziale", won the 63rd Sanremo Music Festival and represented Italy in the Eurovision Song Contest 2013. After peaking at number one in Italy, the single became a minor hit in other European countries. #prontoacorrere also spawned the singles "Pronto a correre" and "Non passerai", both of which entered the top ten in Italy.

== Critical reception ==
James Sayer of ESC Views wrote an extensive review on the album in June 2013, describing it as a record which "succeeds in amalgamating a number of more unexpected styles into one cohesive piece, driven by Marco's unmistakable vocals" and citing "La vita non ascolta" as a stand-out track. Musica e dischi's Katia Del Savio also gave a positive review to the album, noting it includes "at least two different souls: the gutsy one and the very sensitive one." Rockol.it's Pop Topoi was less impressed by #prontoacorrere, claiming it still lacks of a focused identity and describing Michele Canova's production as the element which keeps together the material on the album, but also hiding Mengoni's personality.

== Singles ==
The album was preceded by the song "L'essenziale", which won the 63rd Sanremo Music Festival and was released as a single in February 2013. It debuted at number one on the Italian Albums Chart, and it was certified double platinum by the Federation of the Italian Music Industry for domestic sales exceeding 60,000 units, later becoming the best-selling single in Italy during the first six months of 2013. "L'essenziale" also entered the top 40 in Switzerland, and it charted on the Belgian Ultratip charts both in Wallonia and the Flanders. After being performed as the Italian entry during the final of Eurovision Song Contest 2013, the song also debuted at number 44 on the Spanish Singles Chart and entered the charts in Austria, Germany and the Netherlands.

Together with "L'essenziale", Mengoni's second entry at the Sanremo Music Festival, "Bellissimo", was digitally released on 14 February 2013. Prior to the album's release, the tracks "Non passerai" and "Non me ne accorgo" were released on iTunes as additional previews of #prontoacorrere. "Non passerai" entered the Italian top 10 in March 2013.

The second official single from the album, "Pronto a correre", was released on 19 April 2013, peaking at number seven on the Italian Top Digital Downloads chart in August 2013 and being certified platinum by the Federation of the Italian Music Industry. "Non passerai" was later confirmed as the album's third single, and it debuted on Italian radio stations on 23 August 2013.

== Track listing ==
No.	Title	Lyrics	Music	Length
1.	"L'essenziale"	Roberto Casalino	Marco Mengoni; Casalino; Francesco De Benedittis	3:38
2.	"Non me ne accorgo"	Mengoni; Piero Romitelli	Dario Faini	3:28
3.	"Non passerai"	Andrea Regazzetti; Tobias Gad; Evan Bogart; Leon James DeWyze	Gad; Bogart; DeWyze	3:43
4.	"Un'altra botta"	Mengoni; Regazzetti	Martin Sjoelie; Daniel Watts	3:12
5.	"La vita non ascolta"	Regazzetti; David Fremberg; Amir Aly; Matthias Max	Fremberg; Aly; Max	3:34
6.	"Pronto a correre"	Mengoni; Ermal Meta; Mark Owen; Jamie Norton	Benjamin Weaver; David James Harvey Gibson	3:48
7.	"Bellissimo"	Gianna Nannini; Luigi De Crescenzo	Nannini; Davide Tagliapietra	3:38
8.	"La valle dei re"	Cesare Cremonini	Cremonini	4:05
9.	"I Got the Fear"	Charlie Grant; Pete Woodroffe; Joe Janiak	Grant; Woodroffe; Janiak	3:11
10.	"Avessi un altro modo"	Piervincenzo Cortese; Alessandro Canini	Cortese; Canini	3:15
11.	"Evitiamoci (La soluzione)"	Mengoni; Martin Brammer; Gerard O'Connell; Stephen Robson	Brammer; O'Connell; Robson	3:24
12.	"20 sigarette"	Mengoni; Meta	Meta	4:22
13.	"Spari nel deserto"	Mengoni; Ivano Fossati	Mengoni; Fossati	3:25
14.	"Una parola"	Simone Baldini Tosi	Baldini Troisi	3:31
15.	"Natale senza regali"	Mengoni; Meta	Mengoni; Meta	3:44

== Charts ==
Weekly chart performance for Prontoacorrere
Chart (2011)	Peak position
Italian Albums (FIMI)	1
Spanish Albums (Promusicae)	73
Swiss Albums (Schweizer Hitparade)	52

== Certifications ==
Certifications for Prontoacorrere
Region	Certification	Certified units/sales
Italy (FIMI)	3× Platinum	150,000^{*}
^{*} Sales figures based on certification alone.
