= Aram Quartet =

Italian musical group winner of the first Italian edition of the X Factor

- Origin: Italy
- Genres: Pop
- Years active: 2006–2010
- Labels: Sony BMG
- Members: Antonio Ancora; Raffaele Simone; Antonio Maggio; Michele Cortese

Aram Quartet was an Italian musical group that won the title after taking part in the first Italian edition of the talent show X Factor. The band split in 2010.

The group was composed of:

- Antonio Ancora b. 11 April 1981 in Galatina
- Raffaele Simone b. 4 May 1974 in Lecce
- Antonio Maggio b. 8 August 1986 in San Pietro Vernotico
- Michele Cortese b. 27 September 1985 in Gallipoli.

The name Aram comes from the first letter of the names of the members of the "quartet". They were mentored during the series by Morgan and their vocal coach was Gaudi. They won a contract from Sony BMG estimated at 300,000 Euros.

Their first EP ChiARAMente was released on 18 July 2008 and reached FIMI (Federazione Industria Musicale Italiana) Albums charts at #9. Their first single was "Chi (Who)" reaching position 5 in the Italian Singles Chart. A cover of "Per Elisa" was released by Aram Quartet and reached position 6 in the Italian Singles Chart.

In 2009 they realised their first long album, Il pericolo di essere liberi.

== Discography ==
=== Albums ===
Year	Title	Peak chart positions	Certifications
Year	Title	ITA	Certifications
2009	Il pericolo di essere liberi	27	

=== EPs ===
Year	Title	Peak chart positions	Certifications
Year	Title	ITA	Certifications
2009	ChiARAMente	9	

=== Singles ===
Year	Title	Peak chart positions	Certifications	Album or EP
Year	Title	ITA	Certifications	Album or EP
2008	"Chi (Who)"	5		ChiARAMente
2009	"Per Elisa"	5		ChiARAMente
2009	"Il pericolo è il mio mestiere"	39		Il pericolo di essere liberi

Other songs

- 2009: "Un'Emozione da Poco"

Preceded by None	X Factor (Italy); Winner; 2008	Succeeded by Matteo Becucci
