= Mentre tutto cambia =

Studio album by Annalisa
- Released: 27 March 2012
- Recorded: 2012
- Genre: Pop
- Length: 40:11
- Language: Italian
- Label: Warner
- Producer: Dado Parisini; Pio Stefanini

Annalisa chronology
Nali (2011)	Mentre tutto cambia (2012)	Non so ballare (2013)

Singles from Mentre tutto cambia
- 1. "Senza riserva" Released: 16 March 2012; 2. "Tra due minuti è primavera" Released: 15 June 2012; 3. "Per una notte o per sempre" Released: 14 September 2012; 4. "Tutto sommato" Released: 24 January 2014 (only in the Netherlands)

Mentre tutto cambia is the second studio album by Italian singer Annalisa, released on 27 March 2012 by Warner Music Italy. In January 2014 the album was officially re-released in the Netherlands by Warner Music Netherlands promoted by the single "Tutto sommato".

== Background ==
The album was preceded by the single "Senza riserva", published on 16 March 2012 and certified gold for more than 15,000 digital sales. The single has won the Premio Donne at Italian Videoclip Award 2012. "Tra due minuti è primavera" and "Per una notte o per sempre" were subsequently released as singles.

In 2012, the album received the honorable mention at the Lunezia Award.

The track "Tutto sommato" was part of the soundtrack of the Dutch film Toscaanse Bruiloft. In January 2014, the song was released as a single in the Netherlands, coinciding with the album's release by Warner Music Netherlands.

The Dutch iTunes store includes two bonus tracks, the song "Non so ballare" (from the album Non so ballare) and an unreleased bonus track, "Capirai".

== Commercial success ==
The album debuted at ninth place in the ranking FIMI Albums chart, the highest position achieved by this album, even after.

In FIMI year-end, the album ranked as the 72nd best-selling album in Italy in 2012.

== Track listing ==
Mentre tutto cambia – Italian standard physical and digital track listing
No.	Title	Lyrics	Music	Length
1.	"Senza riserva"	Roberto Casalino	Casalino	03:00
2.	"Non cambiare mai"	Giulia Anania	Dario Faini	03:41
3.	"Lucciole"	Andrea Amati	Faini	03:26
4.	"Per una notte o per sempre"	Anania; Marta Venturini	Anania; Venturini	03:24
5.	"Tutto sommato"	Casalino	Casalino; Niccolò Verrienti	02:58
6.	"Bolle"	Federica Camba; Daniele Coro	Camba; Coro	03:32
7.	"Ottovolante"	Antonio Galbiati	Faini	03:30
8.	"Ancora un'altra volta"	Casalino; Faini	Casalino; Faini	03:16
9.	"Tra due minuti è primavera"	Roberto Kunstler	Faini	03:32
10.	"Per te"	Casalino; Faini	Casalino; Faini	03:05
11.	"Non ho che questo amore"	Casalino	Casalino; Verrienti	02:58
12.	"Prato di orchidee"	Casalino	Casalino; Faini	03:49
Total length:				40:11

Mentre tutto cambia – Netherlands digital edition bonus tracks
No.	Title	Lyrics	Music	Length
13.	"Non so ballare"	Ermal Meta	Meta	03:31
14.	"Capirai"	Ronald Schilperoort	Giancarlo Romita	03:51
Total length:				07:22

== Charts ==
Chart (2012)	Peak position
Italy	9

=== Year-end rankings ===
Chart (2012)	Position
Italy	72

== Mentre tutto cambia Tour ==
Mentre tutto cambia Tour
- Tour by Annalisa
- Location: Italy
- Associated album: Nali and Mentre tutto cambia
- Start date: 29 July 2012
- End date: 17 November 2012
- No. of shows: 14

Annalisa concert chronology
- Mentre tutto cambia Tour (2012); Non so ballare Tour

From 27 July 2012 Annalisa makes its first solo tour, the Mentre tutto cambia Tour. The tour is divided into two parts, the first called pretour summer, starting with the zero date of the same date 27 July in Bellaria-Igea Marina in Sala Congressi and comprising 12 stages, took place mainly in squares and ended on 30 September following a Sturno in Piazza Auferio; the second, which began on 27 October and called theatrical fall tour, including the presence of stages and sets the 60s', sees the first two dates Rome and Milan, promoted by the publication of the third single Per una notte o per sempre, the preview of the second version. Both versions are organized by F&P Group and sponsored by Radio Italia. Below are the stages divided into the two parts mentioned.

=== Date ===
Date	City	States	Place
First part (Pretour summer)
27 July 2012	Bellaria – Igea Marina (RN)	Italy	Sala Congressi (Date zero)
29 July 2012	Casalbordino (CH)	Italy	Piazza Umberto I
1 August 2012	Avellino (AV)	Italy	Piazza San Tommaso
4 August 2012	Zungri (VV)	Italy	Piazza Umberto I
9 August 2012	Campofelice di Roccella (PA)	Italy	Piazza Garibaldi
10 August 2012	San Cataldo (CL)	Italy	Centro Commerciale Il Casale
14 August 2012	Ariano Irpino (AV)	Italy	Piazza Plebiscito
16 August 2012	Melicucco (RC)	Italy	Piazza Senatrice
18 August 2012	Sant'Agata di Puglia (FG)	Italy	Piazza Perillo
9 September 2012	Grazzanise (CE)	Italy	Piazza Montevergine
16 September 2012	San Giovanni di Gerace (RC)	Italy	Piazza Municipio
30 September 2012	Sturno (AV)	Italy	Piazza Auferio
Second part (Theater tour)
27 October 2012	Rome (RM)	Italy	Auditorium Conciliazione
30 October 2012	Milan (MI)	Italy	Teatro Dal Verme
17 October 2012	Castrofilippo (AG)	Italy	Centro Commerciale Le Vigne

=== Setlist ===
1. Per una notte o per sempre
2. Inverno
3. Giorno per giorno
4. Ottovolante
5. Bolle
6. Cado giù
7. Questo bellissimo gioco
8. Non cambiare mai
9. Tra due minuti è primavera
10. Diamante lei e luce lui
11. Senza riserva

=== Band ===
Musicista	Strumento
Emiliano Fantuzzi	Electric guitars and acoustic guitars
Tiziano Borghi	Keyboard
Alessandro Guerzoni	Drums
Marco Dirani	Electric bass
