= Non so ballare =

Studio album by Annalisa
- Released: February 14, 2013
- Recorded: 2013; Punto Rec. Studios; Turin
- Genres: Pop; jazz
- Length: 39:55
- Language: Italian
- Label: Warner
- Producers: Davide Graziano; Marisa Bessuti (exec.)

Annalisa chronology
Mentre tutto cambia (2012)	Non so ballare (2013)	Splende (2015)

Singles from Non so ballare
- 1. "Scintille" Released: February 14, 2013; 2. "Alice e il blu" Released: April 12, 2013; 3. "A modo mio amo" Released: June 24, 2013

Non so ballare is the third studio album by Italian singer Annalisa, released on February 14, 2013 by Warner Music Italy.

== About album ==
The aforementioned digital version titled Non so ballare (Deluxe With Booklet) contains the same tracks and the digital booklet. The album consists of 11 tracks and lasts nearly 40 minutes. It contains the two proposed pieces to Sanremo Music Festival 2013, the title track "Non so ballare" (written and composed by Ermal Meta, then the leader of La Fame di Camilla) the opening track of the disc, and the first single extract, "Scintille", written and composed by Dario Faini with Antonio Galbiati. The latter remained in the race at the festival and finished ninth. This song – that represented Italy in the sixth edition of International Song Contest: The Global Sound, in November 2013 – won the competition. The second single extract – "Alice e il blu", written by Dario Faini – was published on April 12, 2013. This song represented Italy at the OGAE Song Contest and won third place. It was also nominated for Best video at the World Music Awards 2013. Subsequently, the third single – A modo mio amo, edited in both text and in the music from Roberto Casalino – came out June 24, 2013.

The album is composed by Dario Faini, Antonio Galbiati, Fabio Campedelli, Roberto Casalino, Niccolò Verrienti, Andrea Amati and Emiliano Cecere. Representing the historical authors of the singer, or the first time we find Ermal Meta. Meta signature is in writing and composition in several songs, including the second song presented at Sanremo Music Festival 2013, as well as title track of the same album. The track Tutta l'altra gente is an adaptation of a piece by writer and composer, Annalisa, present in the SIAE with the title L’altra gente. The version on the album is also present in the same file and features the same Annalisa as the sole author of the text. The music is also by Annalisa in conjunction with Giuseppe Perris and called Pino Perris. Perris's role in the passage was mainly to treat harmony.

In this work, the record singer has managed all vocal arrangements, later also intervened Roberta Bacciolo. Davide Graziano – former drummer of the Africa Unite – studied both the artistic production and the arrangements. The arrangement of the strings instead of Daniel Bestonzo and Massimo Camarca. Fabrizio Argiolas was involved in the recording, mixing, mastering and editing of the music and the voices of the disc with the help of Christian De Maestri. The musicians include: Alessandro Svampa, Massimo Camarca, Stefano Camarca, Daniel Bestonzo and the aforementioned David Graziano. Special guestparticipants include: Claudio Broglio, Cecio Grano, Roberta Bacciolo, DJ Double S, Mr. T-bone and Manuel Zigante. Annalisa directs male voicals on the chorus called Il Coro del Gigante in Io tu e noi.

=== From pop rock to jazz footprint ===
The genus was mainly pop prevalent here in the variant pop rock. Here however, he was characterized by multiple shades, mainly characterized by fingerprints jazz. We find jazz atmosphere both in the song Scintille that in Io tu e noi, the latter is characterized by a typical Jazz sound. The singer stated that they discovered that following a brief interest in Heavy metal music, jazz is the basis for the ballet classic is for the dance. The minimal reappears in the music of the closing track, La prima volta, consisting of piano and cello.

=== Issues ===
The concept album traces various aspects of love, from the melancholic to the ironic, as with the singer's solo discography. This paper addresses social issues such (like addiction and the consequent solitude which emerged due to the protagonist's bondage desires) in the single, "Alice e il blu". Issues that take away from the reality Alice, with respect to the illusory and utopian world that was created mentally. The piece comes with a story identical to story structures, with a development and a moral at the end. It also addresses the issue of social violence against womenin the track Spara amore mio. The song emphasizes and warns of a blind love which often remain the woman for a purely feminine instinct, next to his executioner rather than away from it. This blind love causes the woman to accept suffering rather than lose her loved one. In the song you can hear the voice on an emergency call to US 911.

The singer herself says

The record shows both sides of the coin with a "b-side" more emotional, intimate and interior. The awareness of its limitations is the thread that ties all the songs, even those of the "side" that deal with lightness, humor and precautions weighty themes such as addiction and the femicide.

— Annalisa Scarrone about concept album

=== The cover and the title ===
The cover was previewed on January 23, 2013, together with the titles of tracks that make up the disc, from the same singer on their official page Facebook. The cover has the face of Annalisa, with straight hair combed over his left shoulder wearing a white blouse fastened by a single button with a black bow tie and unbuttoned his right shoulder. The bottom left shows the name Annalisa, with the central part Nali (nickname of the same) are black and the remaining red letters, while the side and slightly higher, with a smaller font of the album name appears in black.

The title refers to original song Non so ballare, presented by the singer in the Sanremo Music Festival 2013.

== Commercial success ==
The album debuted at ninth place in the ranking FIMI Albums chart, In the following week Non so ballare that reached the six position in the official Italian album chart. In FIMI year-end, the album ranked as the 89th best-selling album in Italy in 2013.

== Track listing ==
No.	Title	Lyrics	Music	Length
1.	"Scintille"	Antonio Galbiati; Dario Faini	Galbiati; Faini	03:08
2.	"Alice e il blu"	Faini	Faini	03:58
3.	"A modo mio amo"	Roberto Casalino	Casalino	03:42
4.	"Ed è ancora settembre"	Emiliano Cecere; Fabio Campedelli; Andrea Amati; Faini	Cecere; Campedelli; Amati; Faini	03:43
5.	"Spara amore mio"	Ermal Meta; Faini	Meta; Faini	03:44
6.	"Io tu e noi"	Meta	Meta	03:18
7.	"Tutta l'altra gente"	Annalisa Scarrone	Scarrone; Giuseppe Perris	04:03
8.	"Meraviglioso addio"	Fabio Campedelli; Faini	Faini	03:14
9.	"Non so ballare"	Meta	Meta	03:31
10.	"Tornerò ad amare"	Casalino	Casalino; Niccolò Verrienti	03:22
11.	"La prima volta"	Meta	Meta	04:12
Total length:				39:55

== Chart ==
Chart (2013)	Peak position
Italy	6

=== Year-end rankings ===
Chart (2013)	Position
Italy	89
