= Scintille =

Single by Annalisa

from the album Non so ballare
- Released: 14 February 2013
- Genre: Jazz
- Length: 3:08
- Label: Warner Music Italy
- Songwriters: Dario Faini; Antonio Galbiati
- Producer: Davide Graziano

Annalisa singles chronology
"Pirati" (2013)	"Scintille" (2013)	"Alice e il blu" (2013)

Music video
- "Scintille" on YouTube

"Scintille" (lit. 'Sparks') is a song recorded by Italian singer Annalisa. It was released by Warner Music Italy on 14 February 2013 as the lead single from her third studio album Non so ballare. The song was written by Dario Faini and Antonio Galbiati, and produced by Davide Graziano.

The song was one of the two Annalisa's entries for the Sanremo Music Festival 2013, where it placed ninth in the grand final. In November, she represented Italy performing "Scintille" at the International Song Contest: The Global Sound, winning the competition.

== Music video ==
A music video to accompany the release of "Scintille" premiered on 12 March 2013 on the website of newspaper Corriere della Sera and was then released onto YouTube. The video was directed by Gaetano Morbioli and shot in Verona.

== Track listing ==
Digital download
No.	Title	Length
1.	"Scintille"	3:08

== Charts ==
Chart performance for "Scintille"
Chart (2013)	Peak position
Italy (FIMI)	14
Italy Airplay (EarOne)	34

Annual chart rankings for "Scintille"
Chart (2013)	Rank
Italy (Musica e dischi)	91
