= Pronto a correre =

Single by Marco Mengoni

from the album #prontoacorrere
- Released: 19 April 2013
- Genre: Pop rock
- Length: 3:48
- Label: Sony Music
- Songwriters: Marco Mengoni; Ermal Meta; Mark Owen; Benjamin Mark Weaver; Jamie Norton; David James Harvey Gibson
- Producer: Michele Canova

Marco Mengoni singles chronology
"L'essenziale" (2013)	"Pronto a correre" (2013)	"Non passerai" (2013)

Music video
- "Pronto a correre" on YouTube

"Pronto a correre" (English: Ready to run) is a song co-written and recorded by Italian singer Marco Mengoni. It was released on 19 April 2013 as the second single from his second studio album #prontoacorrere.

The song was written by Mark Owen, Benjamin Mark Weaver, Jamie Norton, David James Harvey Gibson, Marco Mengoni and Ermal Meta, was produced by Michele Canova. It peaked at number seven on the Italian FIMI Top Digital Downloads chart and it was certified platinum for domestic downloads exceeding 30,000 units.

== Background ==
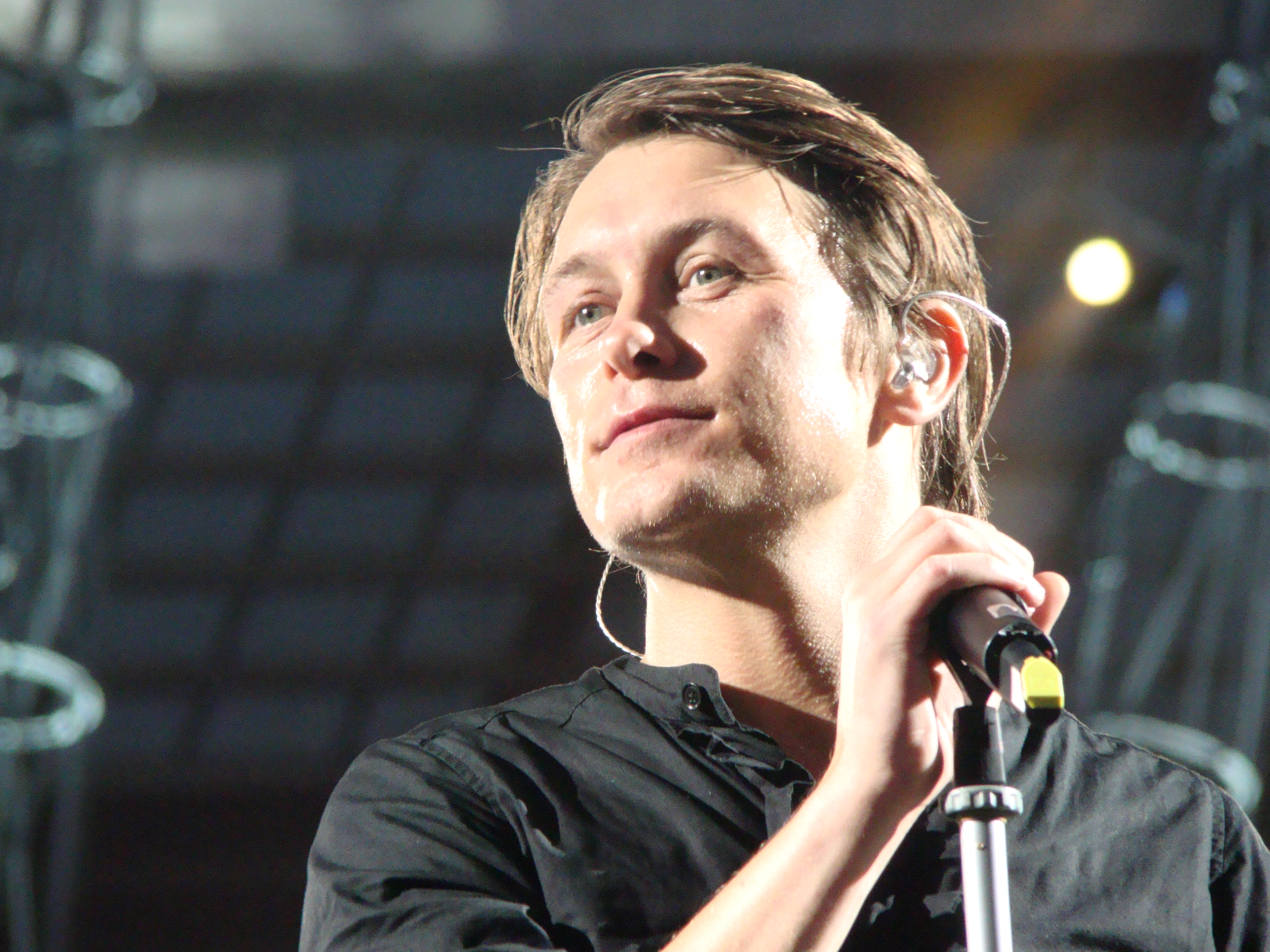
English singer Mark Owen co-wrote the song "Put the Light On", later translated in Italian as "Pronto a correre".

The song was originally written in English, with the title "Put the Light On", by English singer-songwriter Mark Owen, together with Benjamin Mark Weaver, Jamie Norton and David James Harvey Gibson. Mengoni received the original version of the song, and he wrote the Italian-language lyrics together with Ermal Meta, former leader of the indie pop band La Fame di Camilla. The English-language version of "Pronto a correre" as released by Mengoni as a bonus track included on the iTunes version of the album #prontoacorrere.

During an interview released to Italian magazine TV Sorrisi e Canzoni, Mengoni declared that, while working on the track with producer Michele Canova, he never met its original composer, Mark Owen, but he talked with him through the Internet. During the same interview, Mengoni described the meaning of "Pronto a correre", explaining that "it is not a love song, it talks about the scars left throughout life by human relationships, including those with friends or colleagues."

== Music video ==
The music video for the song was directed by Gaetano Morbioli, and it was broadcast for the first time by Sky Uno on 26 April 2013. Filmed in April 2013 at the Stadio Marc'Antonio Bentegodi in Verona, Italy, it shows Mengoni running a relay race together with people of different ages, including a 7-year-old child, a pregnant woman and an 82-year-old woman. According to Mengoni, the video represents the cycle of life, and it describes "the experience of a common growth, the growth of all of those people who live their lives running, as well as those who prefer not to move, or they would like to run but they can't do it. The video wants to bring a message for all of those who live and consider their worst experiences as a gift to improve themselves."

== Live performances ==
Mengoni performed "Pronto a correre" several times. His first televised performance of the song was on 14 April 2013, during Rai 2's TV show Quelli che... il Calcio. On 9 May 2013, he sang the song during the third live show of the first series of The Voice of Italy. Two days later, he performed it with the Sanremo Festival Orchestra during Radio Italia Live, the concert featuring several Italian artists and organized by the broadcaster Radio Italia Solo Musica Italiana in Piazza del Duomo, Milan. Mengoni sang "Pronto a correre" during the award ceremony of the Wind Music Awards at the Foro Italico in Rome on 3 June 2013, as well as during the Italian MTV Awards, held in Florence on 15 June 2013. The song was also included in the set list of L'essenziale tour.

== Charts ==
Chart (2013)	Peak position
Italy (FIMI)	7
Chart (2014)	Peak position
Italy (FIMI) Spanish version	18

== Credits and personnel ==
Credits adapted from #prontoacorrere's liner notes.

Musicians

- David James Harvey Gibson – composer
- Larry Goldings – piano, Hammond organ, keyboards
- Raggie Hamilton – bass
- Michael Landau – guitars
- Marco Mengoni – composer, vocals
- Ermal Meta – composer
- Jamie Norton – composer
- Gary Novak – drums
- Mark Owen – composer
- Luca Scarpa – piano, Hammond organ, keyboards
- Davide Tagliapietra – guitars
- Benjamin Mark Weaver – composer

Production

- Antonio Baglio – mastering
- Michele Canova – producer, mixing, engineer
- Csaba Petocz – engineer
- Davide Tagliapietra – engineer
