= L'essenziale =

2013 single by Marco Mengoni

Single by Marco Mengoni

from the album #prontoacorrere
- Released: 13 February 2013
- Genre: Ballad
- Length: 3:41
- Label: Sony Music
- Songwriters: Marco Mengoni; Roberto Casalino; Francesco De Benedettis
- Producer: Michele Canova Iorfida

Marco Mengoni singles chronology
"Dall'inferno" (2012)	"L'essenziale" (2013)	"Pronto a correre" (2013)

Music video
- "L'essenziale" on YouTube

Eurovision Song Contest 2013 entry
- Country: Italy
- Artist: Marco Mengoni
- Language: Italian
- Composers: Roberto Casalino; Francesco De Benedettis
- Lyricists: Casalino; Mengoni

Finals performance
- Final result: 7th
- Final points: 126

Entry chronology
- ◄ "L'amore è femmina (Out of Love)" (2012)
- "La mia città" (2014) ►

"L'essenziale" (Italian: [lessenˈtsjaːle]; English: "The essential") is a song co-written and recorded by Italian singer Marco Mengoni. It was released on 13 February 2013 by Sony Music as lead single from his second studio album #prontoacorrere.

The song was written by Roberto Casalino, Francesco De Benedettis, and Mengoni, and produced by Michele Canova. Casalino described the song as an Italian-style ballad that is about the necessity of essentiality.

After winning the Sanremo Music Festival 2013, the song was chosen by RAI as the Italian entry at the Eurovision Song Contest 2013, held in Malmö, Sweden on 18 May, finishing seventh among the 26 finalists. "L'essenziale" was commercially successful in Italy, debuting at number one on the FIMI Singles Chart and being certified quadruple platinum for digital downloads surpassing 120,000 units. It also became the third best-selling single of 2013 in the country, as well as the top selling song of the year by an Italian artist. A Spanish-language version of the song, titled "Incomparable", was released in February 2014, reaching the top 20 of the FIMI Singles Chart.

== Background and composition ==
"L'essenziale" was written by Mengoni, Roberto Casalino, and Francesco De Benedittis, and was produced by Michele Canova. Casalino began composing the song in September 2011, in Fano of the Marche region of Italy. During a break in a writing session with other authors, Casalino started playing guitar and wrote a first version of the music and lyrics of the song. Benedittis later contributed to the song, and Casalino recorded a first demo of "L'essenziale". Early in 2012, after hearing Casalino's recording, Mengoni started considering the song for his then-upcoming album. In an interview released to TGCOM, Mengoni revealed that he was not impressed by the song at first. Nonetheless, he decided to try to perform it. In October 2012, Mengoni met Casalino, and they rewrote part of the song's music and lyrics. During this session, Mengoni's idea of the song changed and, according to him, "it became a second skin, an obsession".

The concept of the song was initially inspired by Casalino's personal experience. He revealed that when he began writing the song, he was living a moment in which he had to make important decisions about his future, and had started thinking he should come back to the essential things of life, like the people he really loved and who really counted in his life. After writing down a note with the word "essenziale" (Italian for essential) on it, he composed the song. In an interview released to the Italian magazine TV Sorrisi e Canzoni, Mengoni described "L'essenziale" as "an Italian-style ballad in the tipping point between love and social issues". He later explained that the song refers to all kind of relations, and that it is "about the necessity to go back to essentiality, to open to new emotions and to overcome the difficulties of these days", with the expression of "the urgency to free people from the superstructures and the general crisis". Casalino also claimed that the song's lyrics unwillingly reflect the problems of the Italian society during the 2010s, "without the aim to teach anything to its listeners".

== Music video and promotion ==
The music video for "L'essenziale" was filmed in Milan and Brescia of Northern Italy, and was directed by Giuseppe La Spada. La Spada also produced and edited the video for the song. It was released to YouTube on 15 February 2013. In the first part of the video, Mengoni plays the song at home on a piano, while during the second half, he performs the song underwater. As explained by La Spada during an interview, the music video is a "sort of escape from the world we live in, a jailbreak made of pictures, musics at the piano, water. Because water is the fundamental element that leads us back to the principle of life." A backstage "making-of" video was later released to Mengoni's YouTube channel on 28 March of that year.

While promoting the single and launching #prontoacorrere, Mengoni performed the song several times. After singing it during the Sanremo Music Festival 2013, he performed an acoustic version of it during Fabio Fazio's TV show, Che tempo che fa in March 2013. On 6 April of that year, Mengoni performed the song during the first episode of the talent show Amici di Maria De Filippi, for a duet with contestant Verdiana Zangaro. That same month, during the last episode of the TV comedy show Zelig, Mengoni also dueted with comedian Giovanni Vernia in a parody of "L'essenziale".

"L'essenziale" was also featured as the last song on the set list for Mengoni's tour of the same name, preceding the encore. On 13 April 2013, he sang it during Eurovision in Concert, an event held in Amsterdam and preceding the Eurovision Song Contest 2013, while on 11 May of that year, he performed it as part of Radio Italia Live, a concert featuring several Italian artists and organized by the broadcaster Radio Italia Solo Musica Italiana in Piazza del Duomo, Milan.

== Commercial performance ==
"L'essenziale" debuted at number one on the Italian FIMI Singles Chart during the week ending on 17 February 2013, four days after its release. It held the top spot of the chart until mid April 2013, spending eight consecutive weeks at number one in Italy, before falling outside the top ten three weeks later. On 21 February of that year, the single was certified gold by the Federazione Industria Musicale Italiana, while it went multi-platinum by 2 April 2013, denoting domestic downloads exceeding 60,000 units. As of December 2014, the single has been certified quadruple platinum in Italy, denoting 120,000 shipments. "L'essenziale" later became the best selling-single in Italy during the first six months of 2013 and the third best-selling single of the year, behind "Get Lucky" by Daft Punk and Pharrell Williams, and Avicii's "Wake Me Up". The song also reached the top spot of the Italian Nielsen Music airplay chart for two consecutive weeks.

"L'essenziale" further charted within the top 40 in Switzerland, and it charted on the Belgian Ultratip charts for both Wallonia and Flanders. After being performed during the final of the Eurovision Song Contest 2013, it debuted at number 44 on the Spanish Singles Chart and number 69 on the Dutch Single Top 100. In February 2014, a Spanish-language version of the song, titled "Incomparable", was released as a digital single, peaking at number 14 in Italy.

== Song contests ==
=== Sanremo Music Festival ===
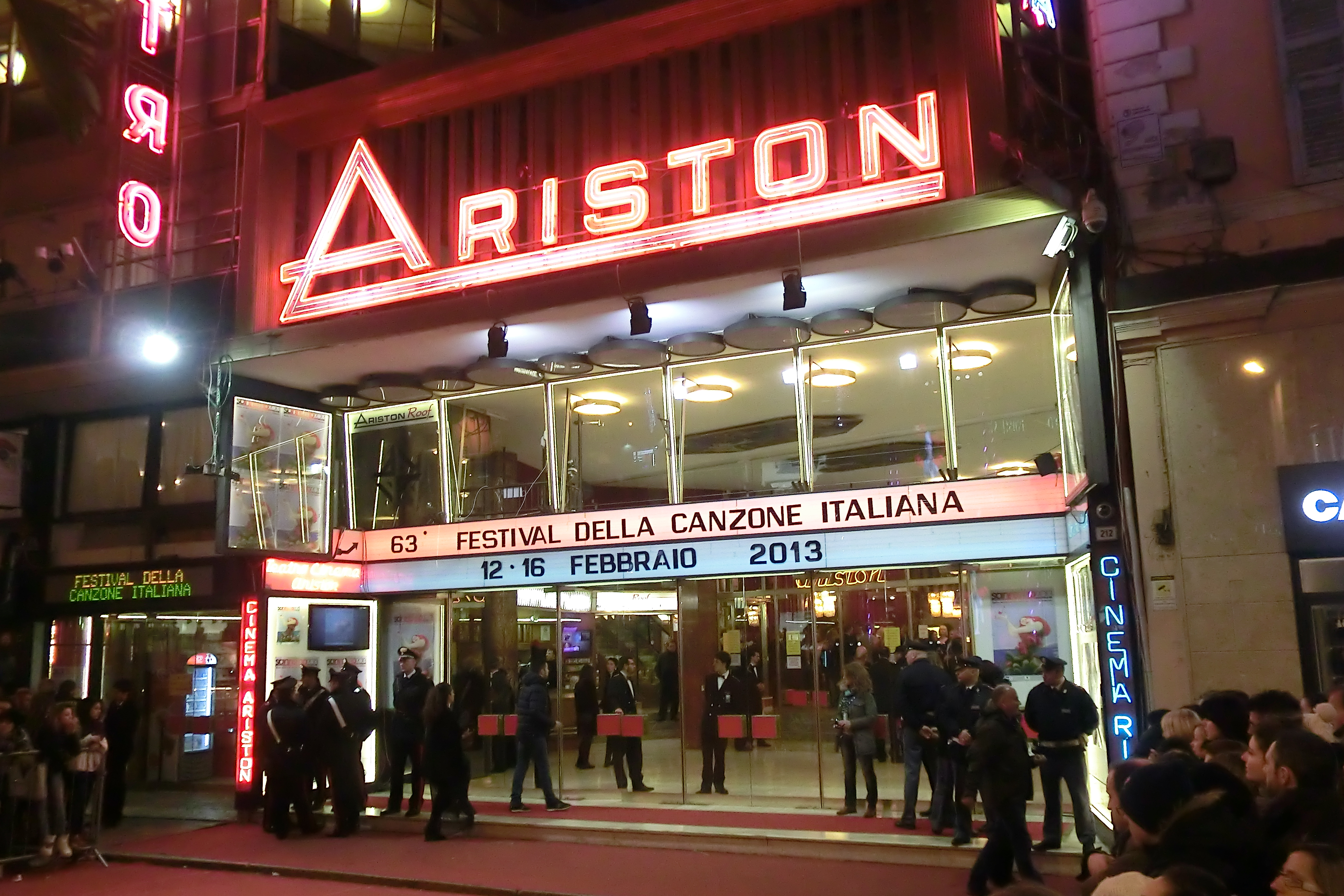
Teatro Ariston, venue of the 63rd Sanremo Music Festival during the final night of the competition.

"L'essenziale" was performed for the first time at the 63rd Sanremo Music Festival on 12 February 2013, as one of Mengoni's entries to the contest, together with "Bellissimo". On the first night of the contest, "L'essenziale" won against the latter as the song to be performed by Mengoni for the next stages of the competition, receiving a score of 52.17% based on televotes combined with preferences of a jury composed of music journalists. During Mengoni's performances, the Sanremo Festival Orchestra was directed by Fabio Gurian.

On the final night of the song contest, held on 16 February 2013, "L'essenziale" finished in first place, receiving 36% of votes in the last round of the competition, beating the remaining entries within the top three: Elio e le Storie Tese's "La canzone mononota" and Modà's "Se si potesse non morire". That same night, an internal jury also selected Mengoni among the other participants to the festival as the Italian entry in the Eurovision Song Contest 2013. The artist selection was exclusive from the competition, the results of which were not directly related to Mengoni's selection; the song that he would sing would be determined at a later date.

=== Eurovision Song Contest ===
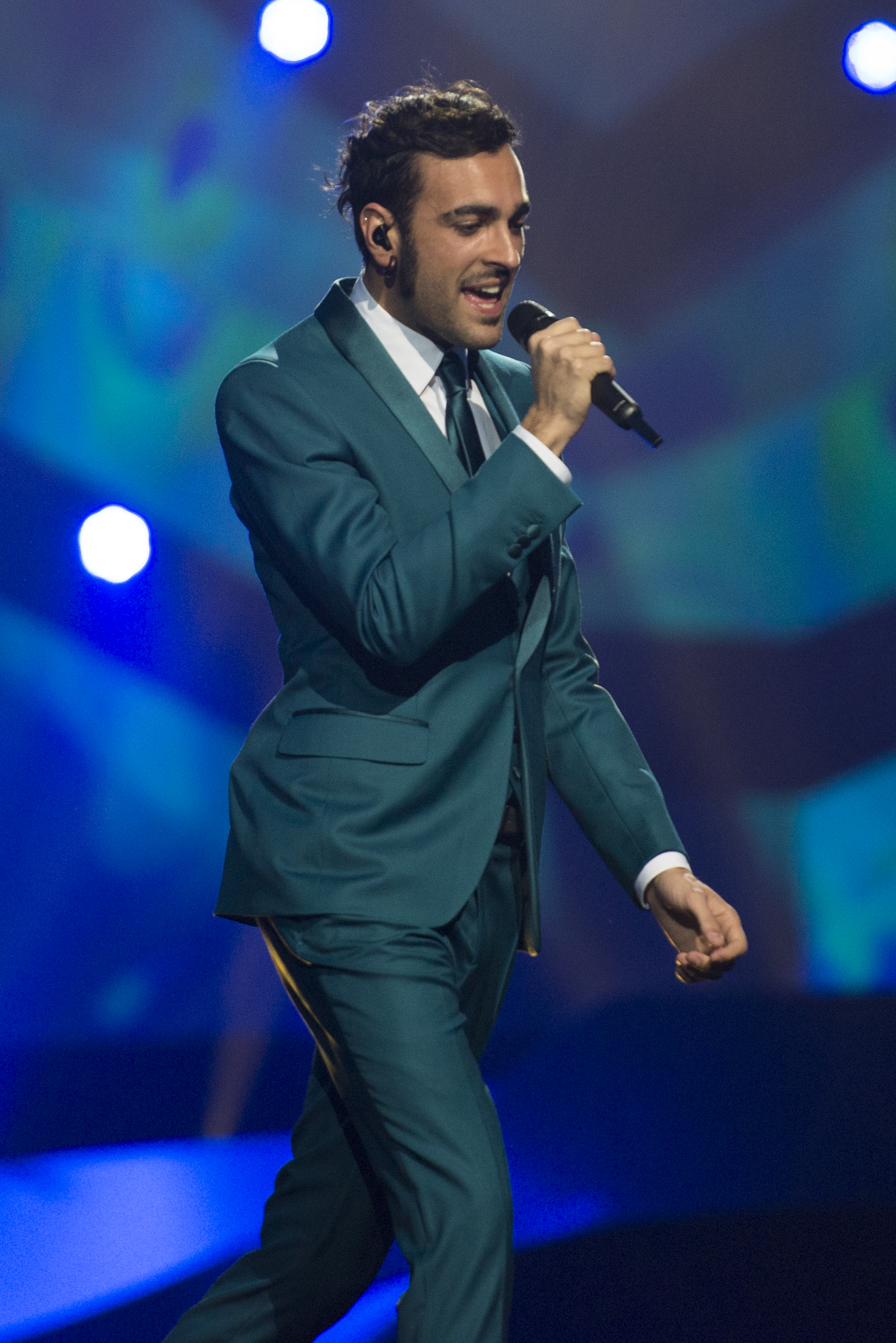
Mengoni performing "L'essenziale" at the Eurovision Song Contest 2013.

In March 2013, "L'essenziale" was announced by RAI as the song to be performed by Mengoni during the Eurovision Song Contest 2013. This marked the first time that Italy was represented in the Eurovision Song Contest by the winning song of the Sanremo Music Festival since 1997, when Jalisse performed "Fiumi di parole". In choosing to perform the song in Italian, Mengoni stated that he wanted to "export an Italian DOC product". In order to fulfill the rules of the contest, the version performed during the competition and included in the compilation of the Eurovision Song Contest 2013 was shortened to a length of three minutes and eleven seconds. In particular, the Eurovision version does not include an instrumental part, as well as some lines of the last chorus.

Since Italy is part of the "Big Five", it automatically qualified for the final of the competition, held in Malmö, Sweden, on 18 May 2013. Mengoni's performance was scheduled as the 23rd of the night. While singing the song, he was alone on stage, performing with modest movements and colours, and wearing a suit designed for him by Salvatore Ferragamo's Massimiliano Giornetti. While commenting on this choice, Mengoni explained: "For this song, which is called 'The Essential', me and my team decided to be just like that on stage. I think it also fits with the message of this Eurovision Song Contest, 'We Are One'. Music doesn't need the spending of a lot of money, you just need the air to hear it."

The song finished seventh in a field of 26, receiving 126 points, including the top score from Spain, Switzerland, and Albania. This marked Italy's third top ten result in a row since its return to the contest in 2011.

== Track listings ==
- Digital download
1. "L'essenziale" – 3:41
- Digital download (Spanish-language version)
1. "Incomparable" – 3:37

== Credits and personnel ==
Credits adapted from #prontoacorrere's liner notes.

Musicians

- Roberto Casalino – composer
- Francesco De Benedettis – composer
- Larry Goldings – piano, Hammond organ, keyboards
- Raggie Hamilton – bass
- Michael Landau – guitars
- Marco Mengoni – composer, vocals
- Gary Novak – drums
- Luca Scarpa – piano, Hammond organ, keyboards
- Davide Tagliapietra – guitars

Production

- Antonio Baglio – mastering
- Michele Canova – producer
- Csaba Petocz – engineer
- Pino "Pinaxa" Pischetola – mixing
- Davide Tagliapietra – engineer

== Charts ==
=== Weekly charts ===
Italian-language version

Chart (2013)	Peak position
Austria (Ö3 Austria Top 40)	60
Belgium (Ultratip Bubbling Under Flanders)	31
Belgium (Ultratip Bubbling Under Wallonia)	27
Germany (GfK)	79
Italy (FIMI)	1
Italy Airplay (EarOne)	1
Netherlands (Single Top 100)	69
Spain (Promusicae)	43
Switzerland (Schweizer Hitparade)	36

Spanish-language version

Chart (2014)	Peak position
Italy (FIMI)	14

=== Year-end charts ===
Chart (2013)	Peak position
Italy (FIMI)	3
Italy Airplay (EarOne)	37

== Certifications ==
Region	Certification	Certified units/sales
Italy (FIMI)	4× Platinum	120,000^{‡}
^{‡} Sales+streaming figures based on certification alone.

== Release history ==
Country	Date	Format	Version	Label	Ref.
Italy	13 February 2013	Digital download	Italian-language version	Sony	
Italy	13 February 2013	Airplay	Italian-language version	Sony	
Various	14 February 2013	Digital download	Italian-language version	Sony	
Various	4 February 2014	Digital download	Spanish-language version	Sony	
