= Chi (Who) =

Single by Aram Quartet
- Released: 30 May 2008
- Recorded: 2008
- Genre: Pop
- Length: 4:08
- Label: Sony BMG
- Songwriters: Morgan and Gaudi

Aram Quartet singles chronology
"Chi (Who)" (2008)	"Il pericolo è il mio mestiere" (2009)

"Chi (Who)" is a 2008 Italian language debut single by Aram Quartet an Italian group of artists who won the first season of Italian series of The X Factor in 2008.

== Background ==
The song "Chi (Who)" was written by X Factor judge Morgan and vocal coach / music producer Gaudi for the show and was performed by Aram Quartet during the finals of the series for Rai 2 that aired on 27 November 2009.The single was officially released by Sony BMG as an EP immediately after the announcement of the results with Aram Quartet declared as winner. It reached #5 on 5 June 2008 on the Italian Singles Chart in its first week of release, then going down to #9 the following week.

== Charts ==
Chart (2008)	Peak position
Italian Singles Chart	5
