= Nali (album) =

Studio album by Annalisa
- Released: March 4, 2011
- Recorded: 2010–2011
- Genre: Pop
- Length: 32:16
- Language: Italian
- Label: Warner Music Italy
- Producer: Dado Parisini; Nicoló Fragile

Annalisa chronology
Nali (2011)	Mentre tutto cambia (2012)

Singles from Nali
- 1. "Diamante lei e luce lui" Released: March 7, 2011; 2. "Giorno per giorno" Released: May 27, 2011

Nali is the debut studio album by Italian singer Annalisa. It was released on 4 March 2011 by Warner Music Italy.

== Background ==
The album features nine tracks, all produced by Dado Parisini with the exception of “Solo”, produced by Nicolò Fragile as well as the only track composed entirely by Annalisa. Some of the songs contained in the album had previously been presented by the singer during the evening of the tenth edition of the talent show Amici di Maria De Filippi and three of these ("Solo", "Cado giú" and "Inverno") were also included in the Amici 10 collection. The disc also contains the live reinterpretation of "Mi sei scoppiato dentro al cuore", a single by Mina released in 1966. The digital edition published on the iTunes Store also features an acoustic version of "Diamante lei e luce lui" as a bonus track. For the promotion of the album, two singles were released. The first, "Diamante lei e luce lui", was written and composed by Roberto Casalino and was published on 7 March 2011, and was subsequently certified gold by the FIMI for over 15,000 copies sold. The second single extracted was "Giorno per giorno", written by Roberto Casalino and composed by him together with Niccolò Verrienti and entered into radio rotation on May 27, 2011.

== Track listing ==
Nali – Standard track listing
No.	Title	Lyrics	Music	Length
1.	"Giorno per giorno"	Roberto Casalino	Casalino; Nicolò Varrienti	03:26
2.	"Fuori"	Federica Camba; Daniele Coro	Camba; Coro	03:41
3.	"Cado giù"	Casalino	Casalino; Dario Faini	03:38
4.	"Inverno"	Faini	Faini	03:24
5.	"Diamante lei e luce lui"	Casalino	Casalino	03:31
6.	"Questo bellissimo gioco"	Camba; Coro	Camba; Coro	04:05
7.	"Solo"	Annalisa Scarrone	Scarrone	03:37
8.	"Brividi"	Camba; Coro	Camba; Coro	03:42
9.	"Mi sei scoppiato dentro al cuore" (Live version)	Lina Wertmüller	Bruno Canfora	03:08
Total length:				35:16

Nali – iTunes edition bonus track
No.	Title	Lyrics	Music	Length
10.	"Diamante lei e luce lui" (Unplugged)	Casalino	Casalino	03:30

== Commercial success ==
Just two days after release, Nali debuted in fifth position on the FIMI Album Ranking, reaching the second highest position in both the third and fourth week of surveys. After almost two and a half months, the album was certified platinum by the FIMI for over 60,000 copies sold in Italy, which earned the singer the CD Platinum Award at the Wind Music Awards 2011. Sales of the album were supported by both the first single "Diamante lei e luce lui" and the promotional single "Questo bellissimo gioco", which entered the Top Singles for two consecutive weeks (the first at 12th position, the second at 5th); this' The last song also remained in the European ranking of the 200 best-selling singles for two months and three weeks, peaking at number 57. At the end of 2011, Nali was ranked the 19th best-selling album in Italy as reported by FIMI. As of October 2012, the album had exceeded 80,000 copies sold.

== Charts ==
Chart (2011)	Peak position
Italy	2

=== Year-end rankings ===
Chart (2011)	Position
Italy	19
