= San Pietro Apostolo, San Pietro Vernotico =

Church in Apulia

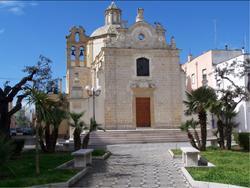

San Pietro Apostolo is a Baroque architecture, Roman Catholic church located in the center of the town of San Pietro Vernotico, province of Brindisi, Italy. A church at the site has been present since about the 11th-century, although it is possible that it dates back to the 4th centuries.

== History ==
Dedicated to St. Peter the Apostle, the church is first mentioned in a document dated 1133. Putatively the Basilian Fathers built a small church dedicated to the Apostle Peter in the hamlet of Venocio because, according to the legend, the Saint spent the winter in the village. Traces of the previous construction of simple quadrangular plan with a vaulted ceiling are located in the ancient room now used as a sacristy. Next to the church there was a place that for centuries was called "oratory of the pilgrims": a set of rooms, or huts, used to host pilgrims who came from distant countries for devotion to St. Peter.

By popular legend, on the left side of the Church, there was once a well with miraculous water, which was used to heal the wounds of tarantula bites. The well was closed in the early 1900s.

== Description ==
The present baroque-style church of San Pietro Apostolo was built around the earlier structure. The Latin cross layout has a dome arising on an octagonal drum at the intersection of the nave and transept. the exterior is decorated with polychrome majolica.

In 1787 the facade of the building was subjected to a deep renovation, as evidenced by the epigraph still visible on the portal of the church: D.O.M. AEDAM HANC DIVO PETRO SACRAM CLERUS VERNOTICENSIS A SCIPIONE SPINA LYCENSIUM PONTIFICI SIBI PATRONATUS JURE LEGATAM, POSTICA ACCESSIONE THOLO, AC MARMORATO EX COLLOATA PIORUM STIPE, AMPLIOREM ELEGANTIOREMQUE F.C.ANNO DOMINI 1787. While the bell gable is dated 1936.

The main altarpiece depicts Peter the Apostle and Jesus; the lateral altars are dedicated to St. Paul and Our Lady of Loreto. In the part of the dome there are four frescoes of the Evangelists. On the walls of the only nave there are some paintings of valuable workmanship and baroque stuccoes of notable historical and artistic interest that represent some episodes of the life of Saint Peter the Apostle.

In the church are preserved the statues of the following saints: San Luigi Gonzaga, San Biagio Vescovo, Santa Rita da Cascia, a statue of the Blessed Virgin of Pompei and another of the Vergine Addolorata.
