= Senza riserva =

Single by Annalisa

from the album Mentre tutto cambia
- Released: 16 March 2012
- Genre: Pop
- Length: 3:00
- Label: Warner Music Italy
- Songwriter: Roberto Casalino
- Producer: Dado Parsini

Annalisa singles chronology
"Giorno per giorno" (2011)	"Senza riserva" (2012)	"Tra due minuti è primavera" (2012)

Music video
- "Senza riserva" on YouTube

"Senza riserva" (lit. 'Without reserve') is a song recorded by Italian singer Annalisa. It was released by Warner Music Italy on 16 March 2012 as the lead single from her second studio album Mentre tutto cambia. It was written by Roberto Casalino and produced by Dado Parisini.

The song peaked at number 8 on the FIMI Singles Chart and was certified platinum in Italy.

== Music video ==
A music video to accompany the release of "Senza riserva" was released onto YouTube on 21 March 2012. It was directed by Gaetano Morbioli and shot in Verona. The video won the Best Italian Videoclip Award.

== Track listing ==
Digital download
No.	Title	Length
1.	"Senza riserva"	3:00

== Charts ==
=== Weekly charts ===
Weekly chart performance for "Senza riserva"
Chart (2012)	Peak
Italy (FIMI)	8

=== Year-end charts ===
Year-end chart performance for "Senza riserva"
Chart (2012)	Rank
Italy (FIMI)	60

== Certifications ==
Certifications for "Senza riserva"
Region	Certification	Certified units/sales
Italy (FIMI)	Platinum	30,000^{‡}
^{‡} Sales+streaming figures based on certification alone.
