= 7 Minutes (2016 film) =

2016 Italian-Swiss-French drama film by Michele Placido

- Directed by: Michele Placido
- Screenplay by: Michele Placido; Stefano Massini; Toni Trupia
- Based on: 7 Minutes by Stefano Massini
- Produced by: Federica Vincenti
- Starring: Ambra Angiolini; Cristiana Capotondi; Fiorella Mannoia; Maria Nazionale; Violante Placido; Clémence Poésy; Sabine Timoteo; Ottavia Piccolo; Anne Consigny; Michele Placido
- Cinematography: Arnaldo Catinari
- Music by: Paolo Buonvino
- Distributed by: Koch Media
- Release date: October 21, 2016 (Roma Film Festival)
- Running time: 90 minutes
- Language: Italian

7 Minutes (Italian: 7 minuti) is a 2016 Italian-Swiss-French drama film co-written and directed by Michele Placido.

The film premiered at the 11th Rome Film Festival and was later screened at the Tokyo International Film Festival. Inspired by a true story, it is loosely based on a drama play of the same name by Stefano Massini.

== Plot ==
A textile company is acquired by a foreign multinational corporation. The new owner seems intent on not making redundancies but asks the workers to sign a particular clause that provides for the 7-minute reduction of lunch time. The development of the debate among the workers will bring each one of them to a phase of profound reflection.

== Cast ==
- Ottavia Piccolo as Bianca
- Cristiana Capotondi as Isabella
- Ambra Angiolini as Greta
- Fiorella Mannoia as Ornella
- Violante Placido as Marianna
- Clémence Poésy as Hira
- Maria Nazionale as Angela
- Balkissa Maiga as Kidal
- Sabine Timoteo as Micaela
- Luisa Cattaneo as Sandra
- Erika D'Ambrosio as Alice
- Anne Consigny as Madame Rochette
- Michele Placido as Michele Varazzi

== See also ==
- List of Italian films of 2016
