= Alice e il blu =

Single by Annalisa

from the album Non so ballare
- Released: 12 April 2013
- Genre: Folk-pop; jazz
- Length: 3:58
- Label: Warner Music Italy
- Songwriter: Dario Faini
- Producer: Davide Graziano

Annalisa singles chronology
"Scintille" (2013)	"Alice e il blu" (2013)	"A modo mio amo" (2013)

Music video
- "Alice e il blu" on YouTube

"Alice e il blu" (lit. 'Alice and the blue') is a song recorded by Italian singer Annalisa. It was released by Warner Music Italy on 12 April 2013 as the second single from her third studio album Non so ballare. The song peaked at number 79 on the FIMI Singles Chart.

== Music video ==
A music video to accompany the release of "Alice e il blu" premiered on 10 May 2013 on the website of newspaper La Repubblica and was released onto YouTube on 15 May 2015. It was directed by Gaetano Morbioli and shot in Verona.

== Track listing ==
Digital download
No.	Title	Length
1.	"Alice e il blu"	3:58

== Charts ==
Chart performance for "Alice e il blu"
Chart (2013)	Peak position
Italy (FIMI)	79
