= Sanremo Music Festival 2013 =

Italian song contest (63rd edition)

Dates and venue
- Semi-final 1: 12 February 2013
- Semi-final 2: 13 February 2013
- Semi-final 3: 14 February 2013
- Semi-final 4: 15 February 2013
- Final: 16 February 2013
- Venue: Teatro Ariston; Sanremo, Italy

Production
- Broadcaster: Radiotelevisione italiana (RAI)
- Director: Duccio Forzano
- Musical director: Mauro Pagani
- Artistic director: Fabio Fazio
- Presenters: Fabio Fazio and Luciana Littizzetto

Vote
- Voting system: Televotes, music journalists, "quality jury"

Big Artists section
- Number of entries: 28
- Winner: "L'essenziale"; Marco Mengoni

Newcomers' section
- Number of entries: 8
- Winner: "Mi servirebbe sapere" Antonio Maggio

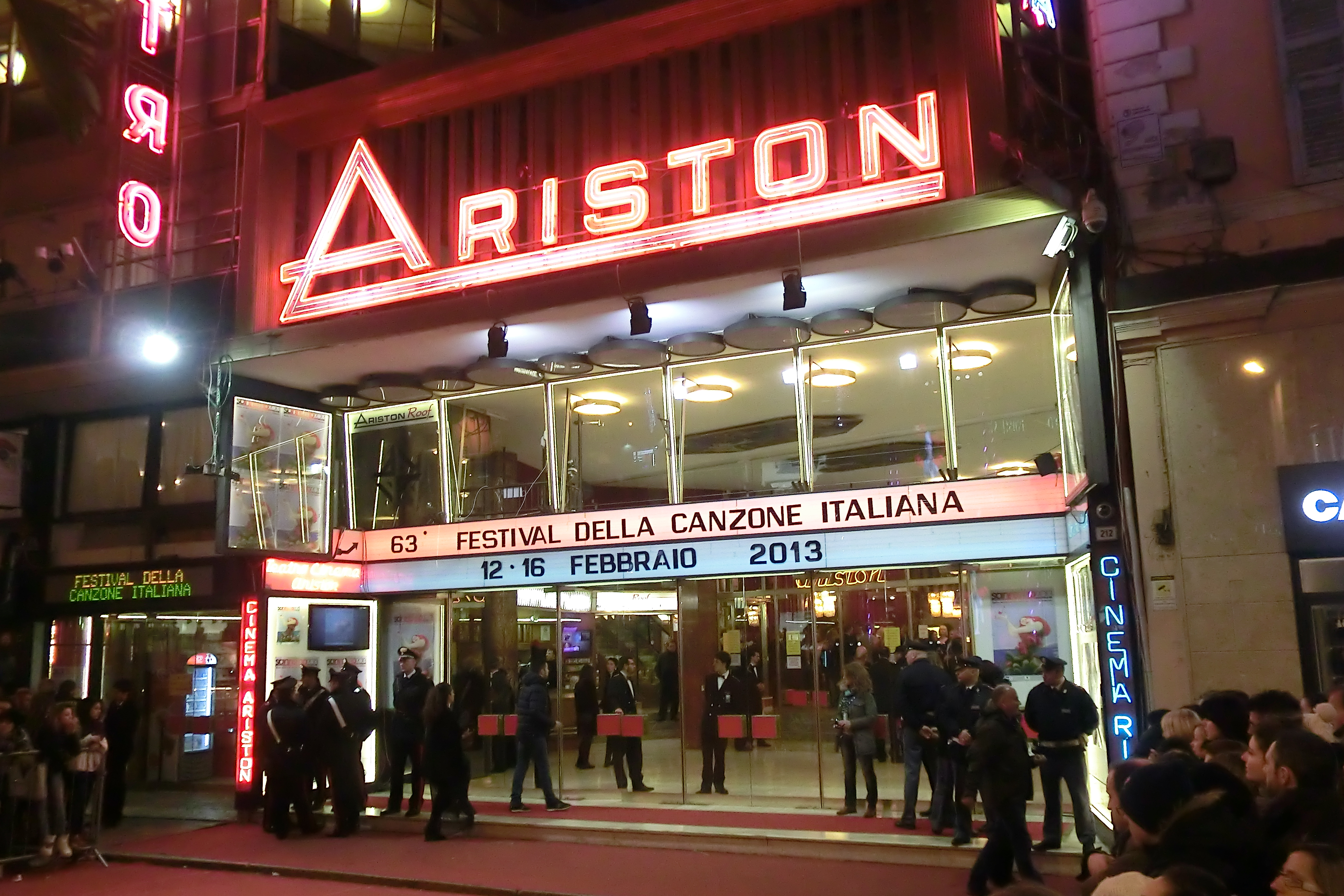
The Teatro Ariston, traditional venue of the festival, during the 2013 edition

The Sanremo Music Festival 2013 (Italian: Festival di Sanremo 2013), officially the 63rd Italian Song Festival (63º Festival della canzone italiana), was the 63rd annual Sanremo Music Festival, a televised song contest held at the Teatro Ariston in Sanremo, Liguria, between 12 and 16 February 2013 and broadcast by Radiotelevisione italiana (RAI). The show was presented by Fabio Fazio with Italian comedy actress Luciana Littizzetto.

The competition featured two different sections. The Big Artists section included 14 established Italian artists, competing with two songs each. During the semi-finals, a song for each artist was eliminated as a result of votes received by public and journalists. On 16 February 2013, Marco Mengoni, based on a combination of televotes and points awarded by a jury, was announced the winner of the competition, with his song "L'essenziale". The Newcomers' section featured eight songs performed by debuting or little known artists. On 13 and 14 February 2013, music journalists and televotes determined the four finalists of the competition. The final winner of the Newcomers' section, Antonio Maggio with the song "Mi servirebbe sapere", was announced on 15 February 2013, based on points awarded by a jury and on televotes.

On 24 January 2013, it was also announced that, as in 2011 and in 2012, an internal commission would select the artist representing Italy in the Eurovision Song Contest 2013 among all the competing acts. During the final, Marco Mengoni was announced as the Italian entrant with "L'essenziale".

== Presenters and personnel ==
Sanremo Music Festival 2013 presenters

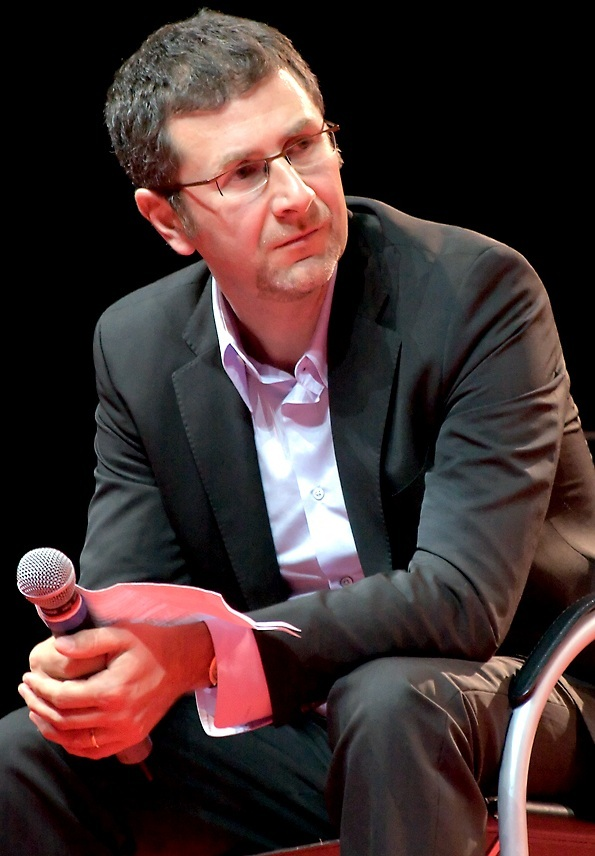
Fabio Fazio

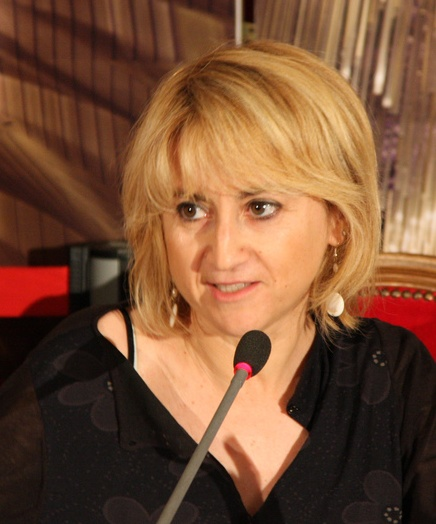
Luciana Littizzetto

Immediately after Gianni Morandi, who presented the contest in 2011 and 2012, announced he didn't want to return to the Sanremo Music Festival for a third consecutive year, Fabio Fazio started being considered for the role. On 11 January 2012, Adnkronos revealed Fazio had signed with RAI, and on 18 January 2012, while presenting RAI's schedules for the second half of 2012 and the first part of 2013, Giancarlo Leone, then president of RAI's entertainment branch, officially announced Fazio as the presenter of the contest. Fazio, who had previously presented the contest in 1999 and in 2000, invited Italian comedy actress Luciana Littizzetto to join him, and Littizzetto confirmed her involvement as co-presenter on 30 September 2012, during Fazio's TV show Che tempo che fa.

Fabio Fazio was also chosen as the artistic director of the show, while Mauro Pagani was later chosen as the music director. Pagani also conducted the Sanremo Festival Orchestra. For the first time, the scenography was created by Francesca Montinaro. The show was directed by Duccio Forzano.

== Awards ==
=== Categoria Campioni ===
- Winner: L'essenziale - Marco Mengoni
- Second Place: La canzone mononota - Elio e le Storie Tese
- Third Place: Se si potesse non morire - Modà
- Premio della Critica "Mia Martini" Campioni Category: La canzone mononota - Elio e le Storie Tese
- Premio al migliore arrangiamento Categoria Campioni: La canzone mononota - Elio e le Storie Tese
- Italian Act for the Eurovision Song Contest 2013: Marco Mengoni

=== Giovani Category ===
- Winner: Mi servirebbe sapere - Antonio Maggio
- Second Place: In equilibrio - Ilaria Porceddu
- Third Place: Il postino (amami uomo) - Renzo Rubino
- Fourth Place: Dietro l'intima ragione - Blastema
- Premio Emanuele Luzzati: Mi servirebbe sapere - Antonio Maggio
- Premio della Critica "Mia Martini" Giovani Category: Il postino (amami uomo) - Renzo Rubino
- Premio "Sergio Bardotti" al miglior testo Giovani Category: Le parole non servono più - Il Cile

=== Career Awards ===
- Toto Cutugno
- Ricchi e Poveri
- Al Bano
- Pippo Baudo

== Shows ==
=== First night ===
During the first night, seven out of fourteen artists competing in the Big Artists section presented their two songs. At the end of the night, a song for each artist was eliminated, as a result of televotes combined with votes given by music journalists.

==== Big Artists section ====
Performances of the acts in the "Big Artists" section during the first night, with competing songs and writers
R/O	Artist	Song	Writer(s)	Results		
R/O	Artist	Song	Writer(s)	Journalists	Televotes	Total
1	Marco Mengoni	"L'essenziale"	Roberto Casalino, Marco Mengoni, Francesco De Benedittis	48.57%	55.76%	52.17%
2	Marco Mengoni	"Bellissimo"	Gianna Nannini, Pacifico, Davide Tagliapietra	51.43%	44.24%	47.84%
3	Raphael Gualazzi	"Senza ritegno"	Raphael Gualazzi	45.45%	31.47%	38.46%
4	Raphael Gualazzi	"Sai (ci basta un sogno)"	Raphael Gualazzi	54.55%	68.53%	61.54%
5	Daniele Silvestri	"A bocca chiusa"	Daniele Silvestri	54.64%	68.01%	61.33%
6	Daniele Silvestri	"Il bisogno di te (ricatto d'onor)"	Daniele Silvestri	45.36%	31.99%	38.68%
7	Simona Molinari & Peter Cincotti	"Dr. Jekyll and Mr. Hide"	Lelio Luttazzi	52.38%	38.87%	45.63%%
8	Simona Molinari & Peter Cincotti	"La felicità"	Simona Molinari, Maurizio Vultaggio, Peter Cincotti, Carlo Avarello	47.62%	61.13%	54.38%
9	Marta sui Tubi	"Dispari"	Marta sui Tubi	33.67%	40.99%	37.33%
10	Marta sui Tubi	"Vorrei"	Marta sui Tubi	66.33%	59.01%	62.67%
11	Maria Nazionale	"Quando non parlo"	Enzo Gragnaniello	47.78%	49.02%	48.40%
12	Maria Nazionale	"È colpa mia"	Fausto Mesolella, Beppe Servillo	52.22%	50.98%	51.60%
13	Chiara	"L'esperienza dell'amore"	Federico Zampaglione, Domenico Zampaglione	38.20%	41.31%	39.75%
14	Chiara	"Il futuro che sarà"	Francesco Bianconi, Luca Chiaravalli, Lisette Gonzalez-Alea	61.80%	58.69%	60.25%

==== Presenters ====
For each artist, the winning song was presented by a different celebrity:

- Marco Alemanno presented Marco Mengoni
- Ilaria D'Amico presented Raphael Gualazzi
- Valeria Bilello presented Daniele Silvestri
- Flavia Pennetta presented Simona Molinari & Peter Cincotti
- Cristina Parodi and Benedetta Parodi presented Marta sui Tubi
- Vincenzo Montella presented Maria Nazionale
- Stefano Tempesti presented Chiara Galiazzo

==== Guests ====
- Felix Baumgartner
- Maurizio Crozza
- Toto Cutugno

=== Second night ===
During the second night, the last seven artists competing in the Big Artists section performed both their songs, and a song for each of them was eliminated based on the combination of televotes and points given by music journalists. During the night, four acts in the Newcomers' section performed their entries, and two of them, Irene Ghiotto and Il Cile, were eliminated.

==== Big Artists section ====
Performances of the acts in the "Big Artists" section during the second night, with competing songs and writers
R/O	Artist	Song	Writer(s)	Results		
R/O	Artist	Song	Writer(s)	Journalists	Televotes	Total
1	Modà	"Se si potesse non morire"	Modà	63.89%	57.29%	60.59%
2	Modà	"Come l'acqua dentro il mare"	Francesco Silvestre	36.11%	42.71%	39.41%
3	Simone Cristicchi	"Mi manchi"	Simone Cristicchi, Felice Di Salvo, Roberto Pacco	38.83%	49.88%	44.36%
4	Simone Cristicchi	"La prima volta (che sono morto)"	Simone Cristicchi	61.17%	50.12%	55.65%
5	Malika Ayane	"Niente"	Giuliano Sangiorgi	49.46%	43.29%	46.38%
6	Malika Ayane	"E se poi"	Giuliano Sangiorgi	50.54%	56.71%	53.63%
7	Almamegretta	"Mamma non lo sa"	Gennaro Della Volpe, Paolo Polcari, Gennaro Tesone	49.41%	53.69%	51.55%
8	Almamegretta	"Onda che vai"	Federico Zampaglione, Domenico Zampaglione	50.59%	46.31%	48.45%
9	Max Gazzè	"I tuoi maledettissimi impegni"	Max Gazzè, Francesco Gazzè, Matteo Buzzanca	18.56%	26.84%	22.70%
10	Max Gazzè	"Sotto casa"	Max Gazzè, Francesco Gazzè, Domenico De Benedettis	81.44%	73.16%	77.30%
11	Annalisa	"Scintille"	Antonio Galbiati, Dario Faini	59.55%	50.14%	54.85%
12	Annalisa	"Non so ballare"	Ermal Meta	40.45%	49.86%	45.15%
13	Elio e le Storie Tese	"Dannati forever"	Elio e le Storie Tese	8.25%	30.41%	19.33%
14	Elio e le Storie Tese	"La canzone mononota"	Elio e le Storie Tese	91.75%	69.59%	80.67%

==== Newcomers section ====
Artists in the "Newcomers" section, with competing songs and writers
R/O	Artist	Song	Writer(s)	Journalists	Televotes	Total	Result
1	Renzo Rubino	"Il postino (amami uomo)"		24.87%	50.39%	37.63%	Advanced
2	Irene Ghiotto	"Baciami?"		19.80%	8.68%	14.24%	Eliminated
3	Il Cile	"Le parole non servono più"		24.37%	17.80%	21.09%	Eliminated
4	Blastema	"Dietro l'intima ragione"		30.96%	23.13%	27.05%	Advanced

==== Presenters ====
As for the first night, for each act in the Big Artists section, the winning song was presented by a different celebrity:

- Max Biaggi and Eleonora Pedron presented Modà
- Jessica Rossi presented Simone Cristicchi
- Neri Marcorè presented Malika Ayane
- Filippa Lagerbäck presented Almamegretta
- Elisa Di Francisca, Arianna Errigo and Ilaria Salvatori presented Max Gazzè
- Carlo Cracco presented Annalisa
- Roberto Giacobbo presented Elio e le Storie Tese

==== Guests ====
- Italian actor Beppe Fiorello was the first guest of the second night. He was interviewed by Fabio Fazio about his role as Domenico Modugno in a TV film.
- Israeli model Bar Refaeli appeared during the night, co-presenting some artists.
- Italian-French singer Carla Bruni performed her new single "Chez Keith e Anita". After being briefly interviewed, she also played guitar while Littizzetto sang a parody of the hit "Quelqu'un m'a dit".
- Israeli singer Asaf Avidan performed a piano vocal version of his hit "Reckoning Song".

=== Third night ===
==== Big Artists section ====
During the third night, the selected song of each act competing in the Big Artists section was performed again.

Performances of the acts in the "Big Artists" section during the third night
R/O	Artist	Song	Results	
R/O	Artist	Song	Televotes	Rank
1	Simona Molinari & Peter Cincotti	"La felicità"	4.79%	6
2	Marco Mengoni	"L'essenziale"	25.28%	1
3	Elio e le Storie Tese	"La canzone mononota"	4.73%	8
4	Malika Ayane	"E se poi"	3.74%	12
5	Marta sui Tubi	"Vorrei"	1.83%	13
6	Chiara	"Il futuro che sarà"	7.52%	4
7	Max Gazzè	"Sotto casa"	3.87%	10
8	Annalisa	"Scintille"	8.97%	3
9	Maria Nazionale	"È colpa mia"	4.78%	7
10	Simone Cristicchi	"La prima volta (che sono morto)"	3.81%	11
11	Modà	"Se si potesse non morire"	20.32%	2
12	Daniele Silvestri	"A bocca chiusa"	4.31%	9
13	Almamegretta	"Mamma non lo sa"	1.21%	14
14	Raphael Gualazzi	"Sai (ci basta un sogno)"	4.84%	5

==== Newcomers section ====
Artists in the "Newcomers" section, with competing songs and writers
R/O	Artist	Song	Writer(s)	Journalists	Televotes	Total	Result
1	Andrea Nardinocchi	"Storia impossibile"	Andrea Nardinocchi	19.05%	14.63%	16.84%	Eliminated
2	Antonio Maggio	"Mi servirebbe sapere"	Antonio Maggio	36.19%	41.12%	38.66%	Advanced
3	Paolo Simoni	"Le parole"		8.57%	8.29%	8.43%	Eliminated
4	Ilaria Porceddu	"In equilibrio"		36.19%	35.96%	36.08%	Advanced

=== Fourth night ===
==== Big Artists section ====
During the fifth night, each act competing in the Big Artists section sang a cover of a song originally performed during a previous edition of the Sanremo Music Festival. Acts were optionally allowed to perform with Italian or international guests.

Because Almamegretta lead singer Raiz observed Shabbat, he did not perform live during the Friday-night broadcast; the group considered performing without him or using a prerecorded video.

Performances of the acts in the Big Artists section during the fourth night
R/O	Artist and guests	Song	Original artist(s) and year
1	Malika Ayane (with dancers Paolo Vecchione & Thomas Signorelli)	"Cosa hai messo nel caffè"	Riccardo Del Turco (1969)
2	Daniele Silvestri	"Piazza Grande"	Lucio Dalla (1972)
3	Annalisa (with Emma)	"Per Elisa"	Alice (1981)
4	Marta sui Tubi (with Antonella Ruggiero)	"Nessuno"	Wilma De Angelis and Mina (1959)
5	Raphael Gualazzi	"Luce (Tramonti a nord est)"	Elisa (2001)
6	Modà (with pianist Adriano Pennino)	"Io che non vivo"	Pino Donaggio (1965)
7	Simone Cristicchi	"Canzone per te"	Sergio Endrigo and Roberto Carlos (1968)
8	Simona Molinari & Peter Cincotti (with guitarist Franco Cerri)	"Tua"	Jula De Palma (1959)
9	Maria Nazionale (with guitarist Mauro Di Domenico)	"Perdere l'amore"	Massimo Ranieri (1988)
10	Marco Mengoni	"Ciao amore ciao"	Luigi Tenco (1967)
11	Elio e le Storie Tese (with actor Rocco Siffredi)	"Un bacio piccolissimo"	Robertino Loreti and Bobby Rydell (1964)
12	Max Gazzè	"Ma che freddo fa"	Nada and The Rokes (1969)
13	Chiara	"Almeno tu nell'universo	Mia Martini (1989)
14	Almamegretta (with Clementino, James Senese, Marcello Coleman & Albino D'Amato)	"Il ragazzo della via Gluck"	Adriano Celentano (1966)

==== Newcomers section ====
Performances of the acts in the Newcomers section during the fourth night
R/O	Artist	Song	Jury	Televotes	Total	Result
1	Antonio Maggio	"Mi servirebbe sapere"	43.00%	28.11%	35,56%	Winner
2	Ilaria Porceddu	"In equilibrio"	24.00%	30.18%	27.09%	2nd place
3	Blastema	"Dietro l'intima ragione"	25.00%	11.52%	18.26%	4th place
4	Renzo Rubino	"Il postino (amami uomo)"	8.00%	30.19%	19.10%	3rd place

=== Fifth night ===
==== Big Artists section (round 1) ====
During the fifth night, the fourteen songs competing in the Big Artists section were performed again. A ranking based on televotes and on a jury was established, and the top three artists advanced to the last round of the final.

Performances of the acts in the "Big Artists" section during the first round of the final
R/O	Artist	Song	Televotes (5th night)	Televotes (combined)	Jury	Total	Rank
1	Raphael Gualazzi	"Sai (ci basta un sogno)"	7.42%	6.13%	15.00%	10.57%	5
2	Almamegretta	"Mamma non lo sa"	1.25%	1.23%	0.50%	0.87%	14
3	Daniele Silvestri	"A bocca chiusa"	5.43%	4.87%	11.50%	8.19%	6
4	Modà	"Se si potesse non morire"	25.04%	22.68%	4.00%	13.34%	3
5	Simone Cristicchi	"La prima volta (che sono morto)"	4.04%	3.93%	2.00%	2.96%	11
6	Maria Nazionale	"È colpa mia"	5.55%	5.17%	3.00%	4.08%	10
7	Annalisa	"Scintille"	8.83%	8.90%	1.00%	4.95%	9
8	Max Gazzè	"Sotto casa"	2.84%	3.36%	8.50%	5.93%	7
9	Chiara	"Il futuro che sarà"	6.32%	6.92%	3.50%	5.21%	8
10	Marta sui Tubi	"Vorrei"	1.07%	1.45%	3.50%	2.48%	12
11	Malika Ayane	"E se poi"	3.06%	3.40%	18.00%	10.70%	4
12	Elio e le Storie Tese	"La canzone mononota"	5.63%	5.18%	22.50%	13.84%	2
13	Marco Mengoni	"L'essenziale"	20.72%	23.00%	6.50%	14.75%	1
14	Simona Molinari & Peter Cincotti	"La felicità"	2.79%	3.79%	0.50%	2.15%	13

==== Big Artists section (round 2) ====
In the second round, the top three songs were performed for the last time, and the final ranking was compiled, based on televotes and on points awarded by a jury. At the end of the night, Marco Mengoni was declared the winner, with his song "L'essenziale".

Performances of the acts in the "Big Artists" section during the second round of the final
R/O	Artist	Song	Televotes	Jury	Total	Result
1	Elio e le Storie Tese	"La canzone mononota"	21.92%	43.34%	32.63%	Second place
2	Modà	"Se si potesse non morire"	33.90%	28.33%	31.12%	3rd place
3	Marco Mengoni	"L'essenziale"	44.18%	28.33%	36.25%	First place

== Ratings ==
Episode	Date	Viewers	Share
Night 1	12 February 2013	12,969,000	48.20%
Night 2	13 February 2013	11,330,000	42.89%
Night 3	14 February 2013	10,700,000	42.50%
Night 4	15 February 2013	11,538,000	48.17%
Night 5	16 February 2013	12,997,000	53.80%

== See also ==
- Italy in the Eurovision Song Contest 2013
