= Non passerai =

Single by Marco Mengoni

from the album #prontoacorrere
- Released: 26 August 2013
- Genre: Pop
- Length: 3:46
- Label: Sony Music
- Songwriters: Tobias Gad; E. Kidd Bogart; Lee DeWyze; Andrea Regazzetti
- Producer: Michele Canova

Marco Mengoni singles chronology
"Pronto a correre" (2013)	"Non passerai" (2013)	"Non me ne accorgo" (2013)

Music video
- "Non passerai" on YouTube

"Non passerai" is a song recorded by Italian singer Marco Mengoni. After being released for digital download on 26 February 2013, as a promotional single preceding Mengoni's second studio album #prontoacorrere, the song was later confirmed to be the official third single, sent to Italian radio stations on 26 August 2013.

The song reached the top 10 in Italy in March 2013, and it was later certified platinum by the Federation of the Italian Music Industry. Its music video, directed by Gaetano Morbioli and shot in Paris, was officially released in late August 2013.

== Background ==
The song was originally written in English by German songwriter Tobias Gad, American producer and songwriter E. Kidd Bogart, and season nine winner of talent show American Idol Lee DeWyze. This version of the song, titled "My Magnetic Heart", was later translated and adapted in Italian by Andrea Regazzetti, under the title "Non passerai". The Italian-language version of the song was first released as a digital download on 26 February 2013, as part of a promotional campaign for the album #prontoacorrere, which was released on 19 March of the same year. The special edition of the album also includes Mengoni's recording of the song with its original English-language lyrics.

== Music video ==
The single's accompanying music video was directed by Gaetano Morbioli. On 22 August 2013, some scenes from the video were broadcast during an interview released by Mengoni to TV channel Rai 1's news program TG1. After being previewed on the website of Italian newspaper Il Corriere della Sera on 26 August 2013, the video was released on Mengoni's VEVO account and to Italian music-themed TV channels on 30 August 2013.

Shot in Paris, the video shows the story of the "Love collector", a character played by Mengoni himself, who walks with his head in a box, asking to take pictures with the ones he meets with the purpose to gather their smile. Several known touristic attractions of Paris appear in the video, including Montmartre and the Louvre Pyramid.

== Track listing ==
- Digital download
1. "Non passerai" – 3:46

== Charts ==
Chart (2013)	Peak position
Italy (FIMI)	10

== Release history ==
Region	Date	Format
Italy	26 February 2013	Digital download
Italy	23 August 2013	Radio airplay
