= San Pietro Vernotico =

- Comune
- Comune di San Pietro Vernotico
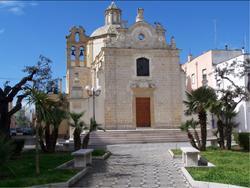
- Church of San Pietro Vernotico

- Location within Italy Location within Apulia
- Coordinates: 40°29′N 18°03′E
- Country: Italy
- Region: Apulia
- Province: Brindisi (BR)
- Frazioni: Campo di Mare

Government
  - Mayor: Pasquale Rizzo

Area
  - Total: 46.94 km^{2} (18.12 sq mi)
- Elevation: 26 m (85 ft)

Population (1 January 2020)
  - Total: 13,295
  - Density: 283.2/km^{2} (733.6/sq mi)
- Demonym: Sanpietrani
- Time zone: UTC+1 (CET)
  - Summer (DST): UTC+2 (CEST)
- Postal code: 72027
- Dialing code: 0831
- Patron saint: St. Peter
- Saint day: June 29
- Website: Official website

San Pietro Vernotico (Brindisino: Santu Piethru) is a town and comune in the province of Brindisi, Apulia, on the south-east coast of Italy. Its main economic activities are tourism and the growing of olives and grapes. It was the site of a substantial Messapian community c. 500 BC.

A few kilometers from the town there is the seaside resort of Campo di Mare, which is part of the municipality.

== History ==
The origins of San Pietro Vernotico date back to the historical period before the Norman, the Ottons of Germany and the Saracen invasions in Salento. The first settlements were around the current church of San Pietro Apostolo, built by Basilian monks between the 8th and 9th century AD, in a pasture area.

Documents of the Angevin-Aragonese period suggest that in the 12th century the village was a hamlet belonging to the County of Lecce. The first official document mentioning San Pietro Vernotico is thought to be dated 1107, when the Countess Sighelgaita, widow of Goffredo Count of Brindisi, donated some of her lands to a "hamlet of San Pietro".

Other documents of the 12th century reveal the birth of the first Universitas Salentine, intended as the first civic administrations, with mayor, auditors, parliament and captain, able to organize the citizens who lived together. "The Universitas Sancti Petri Vernotici" was born around 1300. According to some views, in the 11th century, the Normans, as a sign of their domination, built in the village the Baronial Castle. Afterwards, it was used to host the feudal Bishops of Lecce as a baronial seat and as a defense against enemy attacks. Over time, then, around the Tower the new center of social life of the country was formed, that first revolved around the Church dedicated to the Apostle Peter. The town kept the title of Universitas until 1811. In 1808, indeed, due to the Napoleonic Laws, Gioacchino Murat established the registry of municipalities from January 1 of the following year. San Pietro Vernotico, therefore, in 1812 was no longer Universitas, but municipality of the ancient province of Terra d'Otranto and then Lecce.

During the First World War (1915–18) 114 Sanpietrani lost their lives, among them Ruggero De Simone, who received the gold medal for his heroic deeds. The second half of the 19th century is characterized by a series of interventions aimed at improving public life: the reclamation of marshy and uncultivated lands, the construction of the Brindisi-Lecce railway and finally the police station. Between the end of the 19th century and the beginnings of the 20th century, San Pietro Vernotico records a demographic growth due to the immigration of numerous laborers from the Southern Salento. This phenomenon raised the average level of socio-economic well-being of the town, which in 1911 had 6180 inhabitants.

In 1927 took place the transition of San Pietro Vernotico from the province of Lecce to the province of Brindisi.

== Main sights ==
- Church of San Pietro Apostolo, housing frescoes with the four Evangelists.
- Chiesa Matrice ("Mother Church", 15th century)
- Torre Quadrata ("Square Tower, 14th century")

== People ==
- Thiago, footballer born 1991
- Modugno Domenico (1928–1994) singer and actor. Born in Polignano a Mare (BA), but San Pietro was his adoptive town. He lived here from the age of six until the age of 21 with his family. His first songs were written in Sanpietrano dialect.
- Antonio Maggio (1986 -) musician. Born in San Pietro Vernotico, is an Italian pop singer. He debuted as a member of the vocal group Aram Quartet, winner of the first edition of Italian talent show X Factor 2010, and the 63rd Sanremo Music Festival in the Newcomers' Section.
