= Diamante lei e luce lui =

Single by Annalisa

from the album Nali
- Released: 7 March 2011
- Genre: Pop
- Length: 3:29
- Label: Warner Music Italy
- Songwriter: Roberto Casalino
- Producer: Dado Parsini

Annalisa singles chronology
"Diamante lei e luce lui" (2011)	"Giorno per giorno" (2011)

Music video
- "Diamante lei e luce lui" on YouTube

"Diamante lei e luce lui" (lit. 'She diamond and he light') is the debut single by Italian singer Annalisa. It was released on 7 March 2011 as the lead single from her debut studio album Nali. The song was written by Roberto Casalino and produced by Dado Parisini.

The song premiered during the tenth edition of talent show Amici di Maria De Filippi. "Diamante lei e luce lui" peaked at number 9 on the FIMI Singles Chart and was certified gold in Italy.

== Music video ==
A music video to accompany the release of "Diamante lei e luce lui" premiered on 30 March 2011 on the website of newspaper Corriere della Sera and was then released onto YouTube on 5 April. The video was directed by Serena Corvaglia and Marco Salom.

== Track listing ==
Digital download
No.	Title	Length
1.	"Diamante lei e luce lui"	3:29

== Charts ==
Chart performance for "Diamante lei e luce lui"
Chart (2011)	Peak position
Italy (FIMI)	9

== Certifications ==
Region	Certification	Certified units/sales
Italy (FIMI)	Gold	15,000^{*}
^{*} Sales figures based on certification alone.
