= Il Cile =

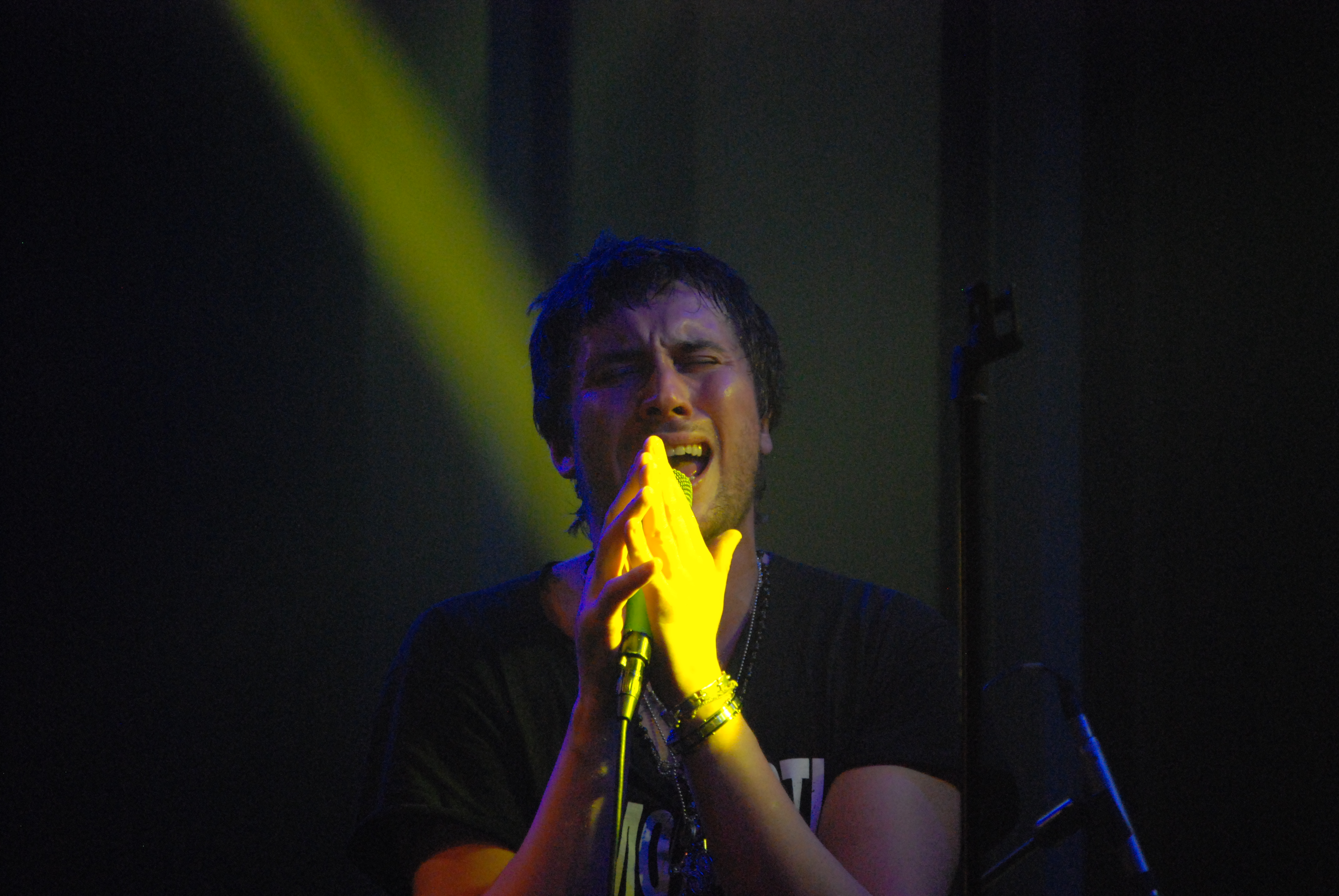
- Il Cile performing in 2012

Background information
- Born: Lorenzo Cilembrini; 9 November 1981 (age 44); Arezzo, Italy
- Genres: Rock, pop
- Occupation: Singer-songwriter
- Years active: 2012–present
- Label: Universal (2012–present)

Lorenzo Cilembrini (born 9 November 1981), better known as Il Cile, is an Italian singer-songwriter. His debut single, "Cemento armato", was released in 2012 and later included in the album Siamo morti a vent'anni, issued by Universal Music during the same year. In 2013, he competed in the Newcomers' section of the 63rd Sanremo Music Festival, performing the song "Le parole non servono più", but was eliminated during the second night of the show. In 2014, he released his second studio album, In Cile Veritas, which became his second top ten record in Italy. He also appeared as a featured artist on the single "Maria Salvador", by Italian rapper J-Ax, which achieved commercial success in 2015.

== Discography ==
=== Studio albums ===
List of studio albums, with chart positions and certifications
Title	Album details	Peak chart positions	Certifications
Title	Album details	ITA	Certifications
Siamo morti a vent'anni	Released: 28 August 2012; Label: Universal; Formats: CD, digital download	5	
In Cile Veritas	Released: 2 September 2014; Label: Universal; Formats: CD, digital download	10	
La fate facile	Released: 8 September 2017; Label: Universal; Formats: CD, digital download	32	

=== Writing credits ===
List of songs written or co-written by Il Cile and performed by other artists
Song and co-writers	Year	Artist	Album
"Junkie beat" (written with Paolo "Pau" Bruni, Enrico "Drigo" Salvi, Fabrizio Barbacci & Cesare Petricich)	2011	Negrita	Dannato vivere
"Fuori controllo" (written with Paolo "Pau" Bruni, Enrico "Drigo" Salvi, Fabrizio Barbacci & Cesare Petricich)	2011	Negrita	Dannato vivere
"Brucerò per te" (written with Paolo "Pau" Bruni, Enrico "Drigo" Salvi, Fabrizio Barbacci & Cesare Petricich)	2011	Negrita	Dannato vivere
"Un giorno di ordinaria magia" (written with Paolo "Pau" Bruni, Enrico "Drigo" Salvi, Fabrizio Barbacci & Cesare Petricich)	2011	Negrita	Dannato vivere
"Non odiarmi" (written with Fabrizio Vanni & Enzo Ghinazzi)	2016	Pupo	Porno contro amore
"Sei tu" (written with Fabrizio Vanni & Enzo Ghinazzi)	2016	Pupo	Porno contro amore
"Lontana da te"	2017	Syria	Io+Io
