= Renzo Rubino =

Italian pop singer songwriter (born 1988)

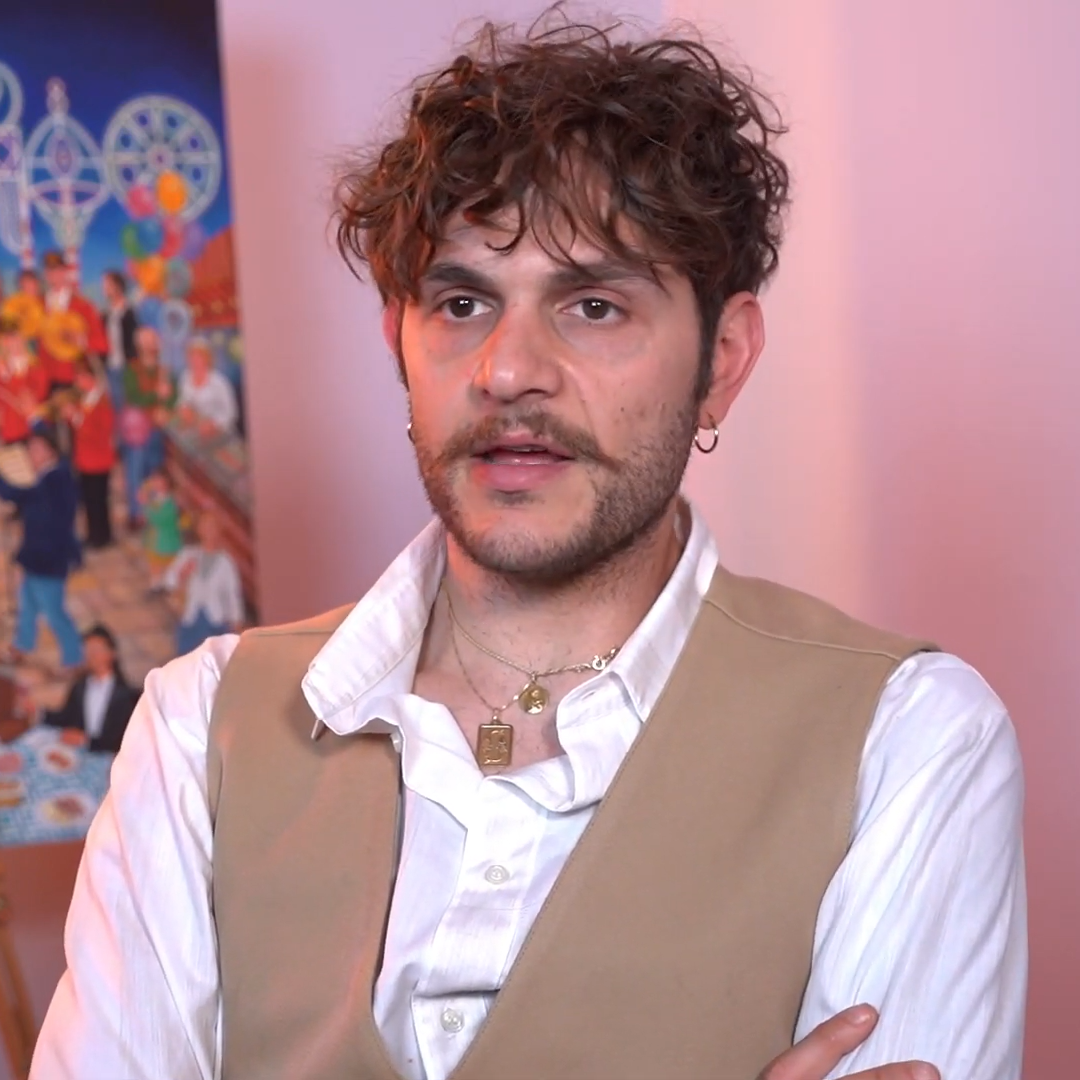
Rubino in 2014

Renzo Rubino (born 17 March 1988) is an Italian pop singer songwriter.

== Career ==
Born in Martina Franca, in the southern region of Apulia, Rubino started his music career performing in nightclubs and pubs, then taking part to several national competitions, including Musicultura 2011 in which he was selected among the eight finalists. After winning the related contest "Area Sanremo", in 2013 Renzo entered the 63rd edition of the televised Italian song contest Sanremo Music Festival with Il Postino (amami uomo), a love song with an openly gay lyric. The song won the "Mia Martini" Critics Award.

== Discography ==
=== Album ===
- 2011 – Farvavole
- 2013 – Poppins
- 2014 – Secondo Rubino
- 2017 – Il Gelato Dopo Il Mare
