= Almamegretta =

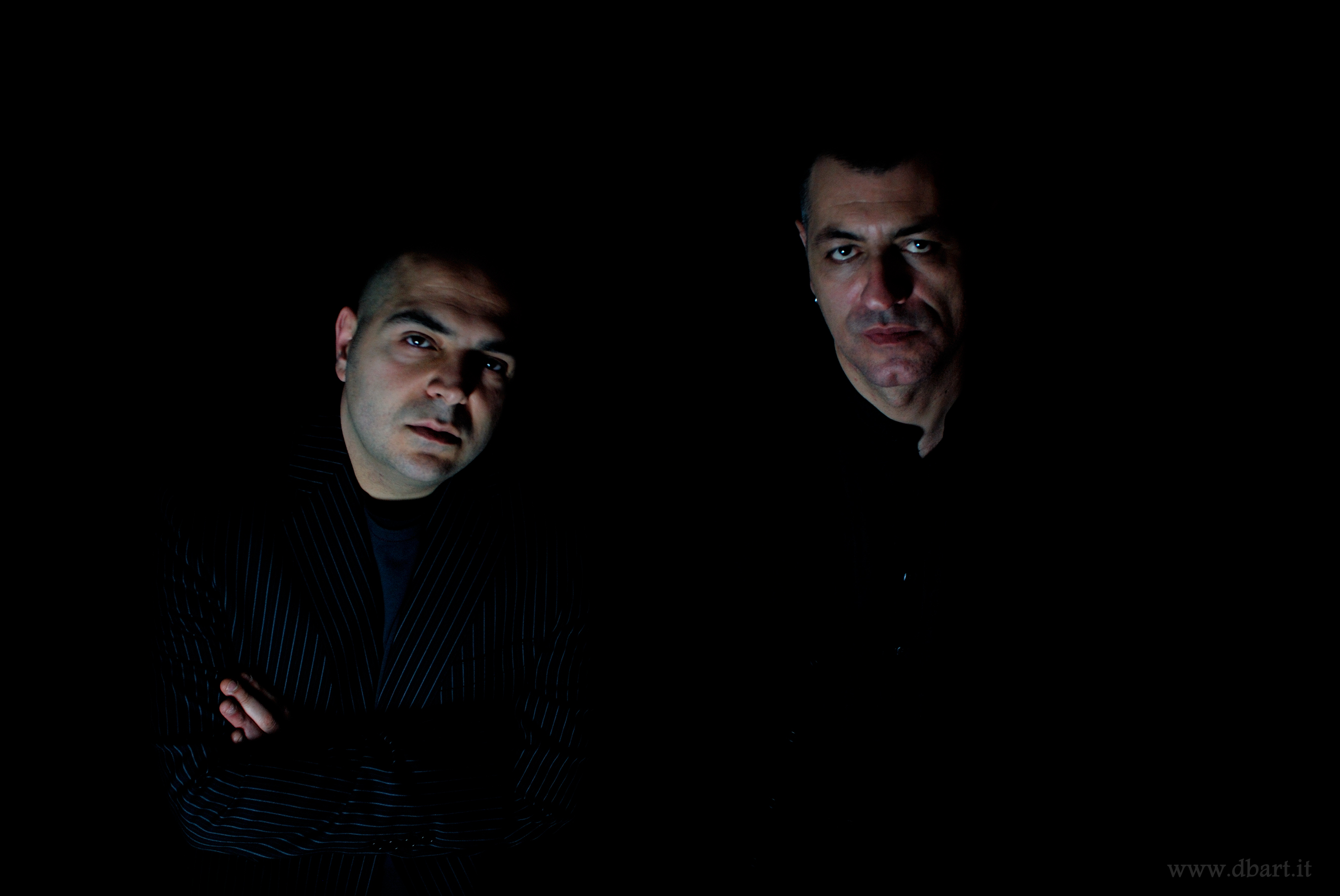
- Almamegretta 2009

Background information
- Origin: Naples, Italy
- Genres: Dub; world; reggae
- Years active: 1987–present
- Labels: CNI; BMG; Sanacore
- Members: Gennaro Tesone "Gennaro T"; Lucariello; Zaira Zigante; Paolo Polcari; Fefo Forconi; Mario Formisano
- Past members: Gemma Aiello; Gianni Guastella (deceased); Raiz; Patrizia Di Fiore; Gianni; Tonino; Ash; Stefano "D.RaD" Facchielli (deceased)
- Website: www.almamegretta.it

Almamegretta are a dub group from Naples, Italy. Their lyrics are in Napoletano. Their music became quite successful within the European trip hop scene, leading to collaborations with Massive Attack, Bill Laswell, Transglobal Underground, Zion Train, and Adrian Sherwood, the later also remixed their album "Sanacore".

== History ==
The band was established by Gianni Mantice (guitar), Patrizia Di Fiore (vocals), Gemma Aiello (bass), Gianni Guastella (keyboards) and Gennaro T (drums) in 1987. In 1990 Di Fiore left the band and was replaced by Raiz (also spelled Rais and Raiss) and Paolo Polcari (keyboards). D.Rad (Stefano Facchielli) later joined the group as dubber. In 2003 Raiz left the band to pursue a solo career, although he briefly reunited with the band for their 2013 effort Controra. In 2004 D.RaD died after falling off his scooter while riding in the rain.

Italian musician Pier Paolo Polcari worked with the band between 1990 and 1999, being involved in the release of five albums, primarily for BMG Records), and touring Italy and Europe several times for approximately 600 gigs. At the end of 1999, he moved to London, where he spent two years acquiring a master's degree in film and video composition with Maestro Amit Sen. He returned to work with Almamegretta and produced two albums (Vulgus in 2006 and Dubfellas Vol.2 in 2010).

In a well documented story, during the group's appearance at the Sanremo Music Festival 2013, lead singer Raiz did not perform live during the Friday-night broadcast because he observed Shabbat; the group considered performing without him or using a prerecorded video.

== Discography ==
- Figli di Annibale (1992, Anagrumba/CNI/BMG)
- Animamigrante (1993, Anagrumba/CNI/BMG)
- Fattalla (1994, Anagrumba/CNI/BMG)
- Sanacore (1995, Anagrumba/CNI/BMG)
- Indubb (1996, BMG)
- Lingo (1998, BMG)
- 4/4 (1999, BMG)
- Imaginaria (2001, BMG
- Venite! Venite! (2002, BMG)
- Sciuoglie 'e Cane (2003, Sanacore) (live)
- Almamegretta presents Dubfellas (2006, Sanacore)
- Vulgus (2008, Sanacore)
- Controra (2013, Universal)
- EnneEnne Dub (2016, Sanacore)
- Senghe (2022, Saifam Music)
