= Antonio Maggio =

Italian pop singer (born 1986)

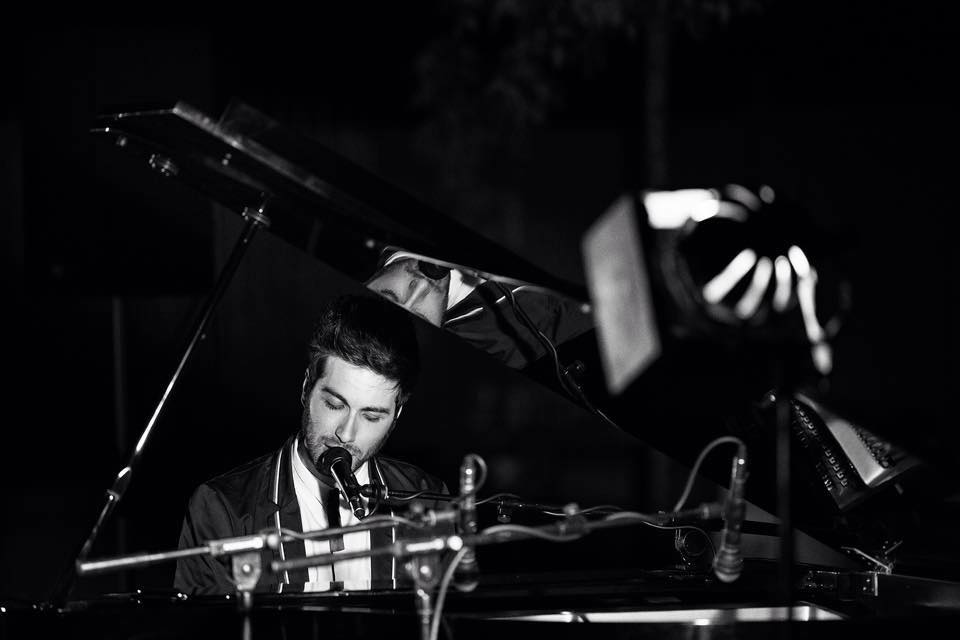

Background information
- Born: Antonio Maggio; 8 August 1986 (age 40); San Pietro Vernotico, Italy
- Genres: Pop
- Occupations: Singer, songwriter
- Instrument: Vocals
- Years active: 2008–present
- Labels: Rusty Records, Universal Music
- Website: antoniomaggio.net

Antonio Maggio (born 8 August 1986) is an Italian pop singer. He debuted as a member of the vocal group Aram Quartet, which won the first edition of Italian talent show X Factor. In 2010 he started a solo career, and in 2013 he won the 63rd Sanremo Music Festival in the Newcomers' Section. His debut album, Nonostante tutto, was released in February 2013.

== Career ==
In December 2007, Maggio was a founding member of the vocal band Aram Quartet, together with his friends Michele Ancora, Antonio Cortese and Raffaele Simone. In June 2008, the band won the first Italian series of X Factor. After releasing the EP ChiARAMente, which entered the top ten in Italy, and the album Il pericolo di essere liberi, which failed to achieve commercial success, Aram Quartet decided to split in 2010.

Maggio decided to start a career as a soloist. His debut single, "Inconsolabile", was released in July 2010. After signing with independent record label Rusty Records, Maggio recorded the song "Nonostante tutto", with which he tried to compete in the Sanremo Music Festival 2012, but the song failed to qualify, and was released as a single on 21 March 2012. In 2013, Maggio qualified for the 63rd Sanremo Music Festival with the song "Mi servirebbe sapere", which later won the competition in the Newcomers' Section. The single peaked at number 7 on the FIMI Top Digital Downloads chart, and it was certified gold by the Federation of the Italian Music Industry. Maggio's debut album, Nonostante tutto, was released by Universal Music Italy in February of the same year, and it also spawned the singles "Nonostante tutto", re-released in May 2013, and "Anche il tempo può aspettare".

In September 2013, Maggio released a new song, "Santo lunedì", which was also used as a jingle for the sports television program Il processo del lunedì.

== Discography ==
=== Albums ===
List of albums, with selected chart positions and certifications
Title	Album details	Peak chart positions	Certifications
Title	Album details	ITA	Certifications
Mi servirebbe sapere	Released: 14 February 2013; Label: Universal; Formats: CD, download	24	

=== Singles ===
List of singles, with chart positions and certifications in Italy
Single	Year	Peak chart positions	Certifications	Album
Single	Year	ITA	Certifications	Album
"Inconsolabile"	2011	—		Nonostante tutto
"Nonostante tutto"	2012	—		Nonostante tutto
"Mi servirebbe sapere"	2013	7	FIMI: Gold	Nonostante tutto
"Anche il tempo può aspettare"	2013	—		Nonostante tutto
"Santo lunedì"	2013	—		Non-album single

=== Other appearances ===
List of other album appearances
Song	Year	Album
"L'interruttore generale (Canzone d'autore)" (Moreno feat. Antonio Maggio)	2014	Incredibile
