= Maria Nazionale =

Italian pop singer and actress

Maria Nazionale (born July 31,1969 in Torre Annunziata) is an Italian pop singer and actress.

== Career ==
In 2009, she was nominated to the David di Donatello for Best Supporting Actress, thanks to her performance in Gomorra.

In 2013, Nazionale took part in the 63rd edition of the televised Italian song contest Sanremo Music Festival with the song "È colpa mia".

== Discography ==
=== Albums ===
- Ha da passà 'a nuttata (1994)
- Dolci ricordi (1995)
- Napoli... ti amo (1996)
- Le classiche di Napoli (1997)
- Storie 'e femmene (1997)
- O core 'e Napule (1998)
- Sentimenti (1999)
- Maria Nazionale le classifiche (2004)
- Scema io te voglio bene (2004)
- Puortame a cammenà (2008)
- Libera (2013)

== Filmography ==
=== Television ===
- Sottovoce with Luigi Marzullo – Rai 1
- Maurizio Costanzo Show with Maurizio Costanzo – Canale 5
- Furore with Alessandro Greco – Rai 2
- Speciale Buona Domenica – Canale 5
- Cominciamo bene – Rai 3
- Tappeto Volante – Canale Italia
- In famiglia – Rai 2
- La vita in diretta – Rai 1
- Viva Napoli with Mike Bongiorno – Canale 5

=== Film ===
- Gomorrah (2008)
- 7 Minutes (2016)
- Tenderness (2017)
- The King of Laughter (2021)
