= Simona Molinari =

Italian jazz music singer (born 1983)

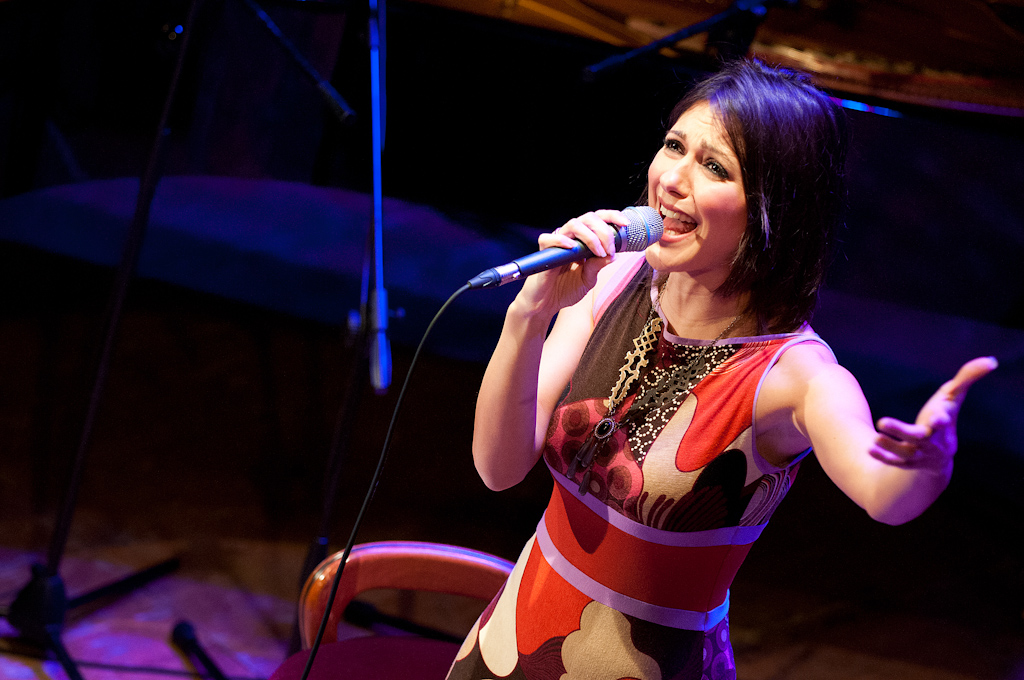
- Simona Molinari performing in Lanciano, Abruzzo on 28 November 2012

Background information
- Born: Simona Molinari; 23 February 1983 (age 43); Naples, Italy
- Genres: Jazz, pop, swing, bossa nova
- Occupations: Singer, songwriter
- Instrument: Vocals
- Years active: 2005–present
- Labels: Universal, Warner
- Website: www.simonamolinari.it

Simona Molinari (born 23 February 1983) is an Italian jazz music singer. She performed at the Sanremo Music Festival 2009 her song "Egocentrica". Shortly after, she released the album of the same name.

== Discography ==
=== Studio albums ===
- Egocentrica (2009)- ITA No. 75
- Croce e delizia (2010)
- Tua (2011) – ITA No. 29
- Dr.Jekill, Mr. Hyde (2013) – ITA No. 16
- Casa Mia (2015)
- Petali (2022)

=== Singles ===
- 2009 – "Egocentrica"
- 2009 – "Nell'aria"
- 2010 – "Amore a prima vista" (feat. Ornella Vanoni) – ITA No. 10
- 2011 – "Forse" (feat. Danny Diaz) – ITA No. 34
- 2011 – "In cerca di te" (feat. Peter Cincotti) – ITA No. 25
- 2013 – "La felicità" – ITA No. 14
- 2013 – "Dr.Jekill, Mr. Hyde"

== Awards and nominations ==
Year	Award	Nomination	Work	Result
2009	Mogol Award	Best Lyrics	"Egocentrica"	Nominated
2009	Lunezia Award	Lunezia Award "New Stars"	Egocentrica	Won
2010	Wind Music Awards	Special Award FIMI-PMI-AFI for Best Young Talent	Herself	Won
2010	Lunezia Award	Jazz Award	Herself	Won
